= Double Springs, California =

Historical Landmark, form town in California, United States

Double Springs
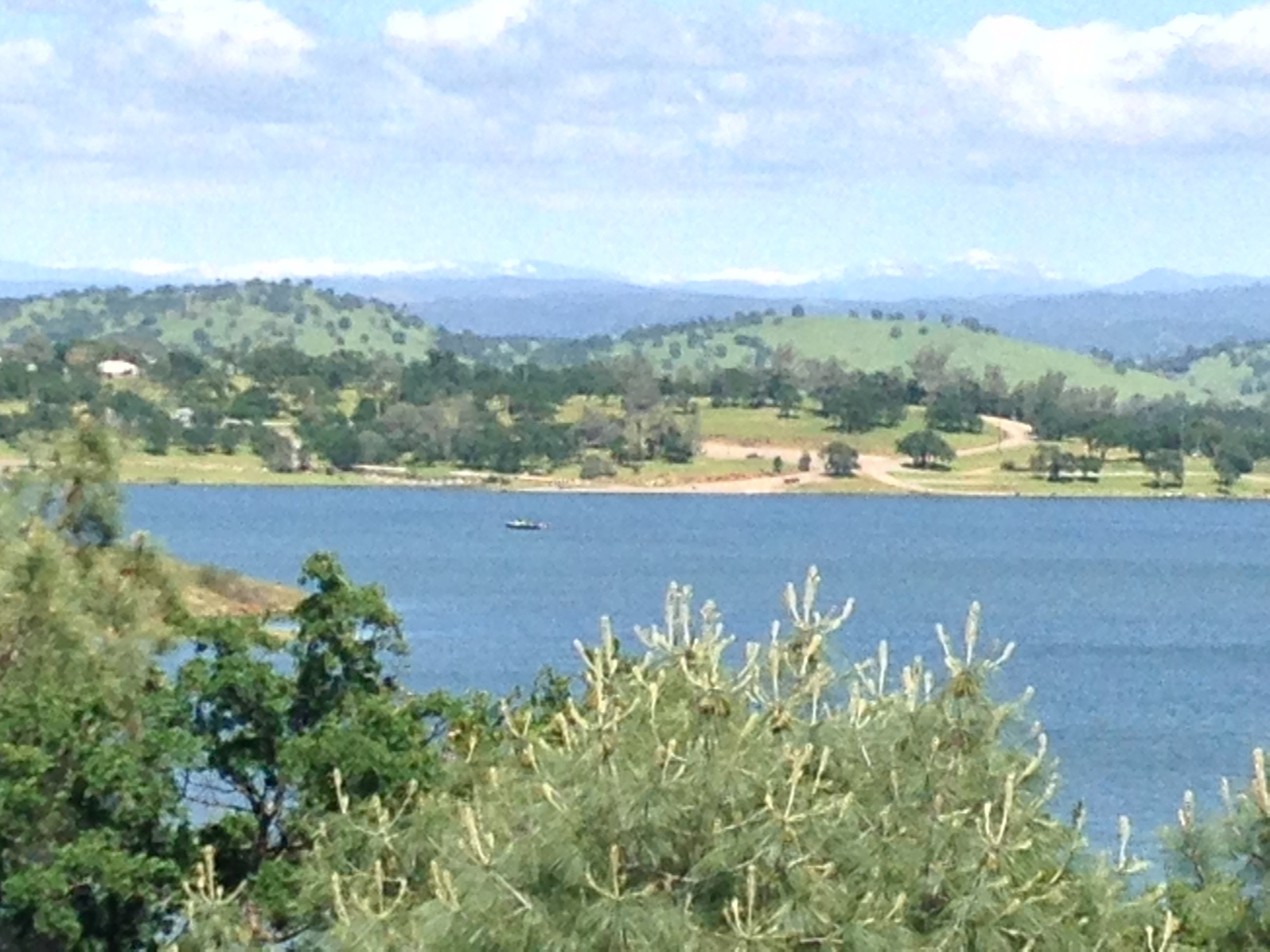
- New Hogan Lake was built just south of the former town of Double Springs in 1963

- Location within California Location within the United States
- 38.205194°N 120.791139°W
- Location: Valley Springs, California

California Historical Landmark
- Designated: September 3, 1937
- Reference no.: 264

Double Springs, California, is a historical site of the former town in Calaveras County, now in Valley Springs, California. The town was built during the California Gold Rush. Double Springs was founded on February 18, 1850, two years after the start of the California Gold Rush. Double Springs grew so quickly that it was the seat of Calaveras County in 1850. The county seat was a coveted honor and a year later, in 1851, Jackson was able to claim the title, but only for a year. In 1852 by popular vote, Mokelumne Hill was able to become the county seat until 1866 when it moved to San Andreas. The Double Springs was in what is called the California Mother Lode mining region. The Double Springs old courthouse was built in 1849, and was moved, its original spot is now rural land. A foundation mark was placed at the site of the old courthouse, installed by the Calaveras Chamber of Commerce. The courthouse is now at the Calaveras County Museum Complex in San Andreas. Double Springs received its name from two nearby springs that are between the low hills nearby. Alexander R. Wheat built a large house from squared sandstone in 1860, the house is still there. One of the other remains of Double Springs is a family cemetery. Double Springs site is about 3.6 miles east of Valley Springs and is mostly rural land near Youngs Creek. The site of Double Springs is a California Historical Landmark No. 264.

== See also ==
- California Historical Landmarks in Calaveras County
- Calaveras County Courthouse
