= Sheep Ranch, California =

Unincorporated community in California, United States

Sheep Ranch
- Unincorporated community
- Location in California Sheep Ranch (the United States)
- Coordinates: 38°12′34″N 120°27′51″W
- Country: United States
- State: California
- County: Calaveras
- Elevation: 2,359 ft (719 m)

Sheep Ranch (formerly, Sheepranch) is an unincorporated community in Calaveras County, California, United States. It lies at an elevation of 2359 feet (719 m).

Sheep Ranch was named after a sheep ranch. Officially listed as "Sheep Ranch", the official post office stamp did at one time read "Sheepranch" (Zip: 95250). One of the very few "free-range" areas in California, there are several hundred freely roaming sheep throughout the town. Sheep Ranch is located approximately halfway between O'Neal Creek and San Antonio Creek on Sheep Ranch Road in the center of Calaveras County.

== History ==
The town was once surrounded by sheep corrals, and in 1860 gold ore was discovered in the corrals where the sheep were kept at night. Soon Sheepranch was a bustling gold mining town. Before the turn of the century there were five flourishing gold mines and one had a ten-stamp mill. The town also supported 15 saloons." The town was patented on August 4, 1880 by Judge Ira Hill Read.

The main mine in town was known as the Hearst mine. George Hearst, who with partners bought the mine in 1897, was the father of William Randolph Hearst. The mine operated under various company names until shut down by the government in 1942.

At one time the town of Sheepranch held two churches, one Catholic and the other Protestant. The local red school house, which still stands as a private home, employed two teachers until 1907 when the enrollment dwindled to 30 pupils taught by one teacher. The Eagle Hotel and the Pioneer Hotel were the two prominent local establishments, but only the Pioneer Hotel still stands.

The first post office opened in 1877, and was renamed Sheepranch in 1895.

In 2015, Sheep Ranch was spared by the Butte Fire by a margin of a quarter mile.

== Today ==
The population of Sheep Ranch is fewer than one hundred people, with sheep well out-numbering humans. There are currently no active businesses in Sheep Ranch, with the nearest facilities being located in Mountain Ranch to the west, and in Avery to the east. In January 2008, the postal service contractor in town relocated, resulting in the town having its ZIP code archived (i.e., made "not usable") by the U.S. Postal Service. Locals can still use the town name, but must use the ZIP code for nearby Mountain Ranch (95246).

== Demographics ==
Historical population
Census	Pop.	Note	%±

The United States Census Bureau defined Sheep Ranch as a census designated place (CDP) in 2023.
