= Shenkel Island =

Island in California

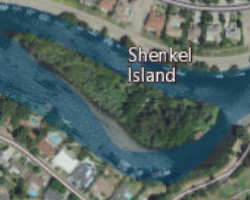
- USGS aerial imagery of Shenkel Island, with Sargent-Barnhart Tract to the north across the Calaveras River.

- Location within Sacramento-San Joaquin River Delta Location within California Location within the United States

Geography
- Location: Northern California
- Coordinates: 37°58′03″N 121°21′40″W
- Adjacent to: Sacramento–San Joaquin River Delta
- Highest elevation: 7 ft (2.1 m)

Administration
- United States
- State: California
- County: San Joaquin

Shenkel Island is a small island in the Sacramento–San Joaquin River Delta. It is part of San Joaquin County, California. Its coordinates are 37°58′03″N 121°21′40″W, and the United States Geological Survey gives its elevation as 7 ft (2.1 m).
