= California Caverns =

Cave in California, United States

Coordinates: 38°12′10″N 120°30′32″W

California Cavern
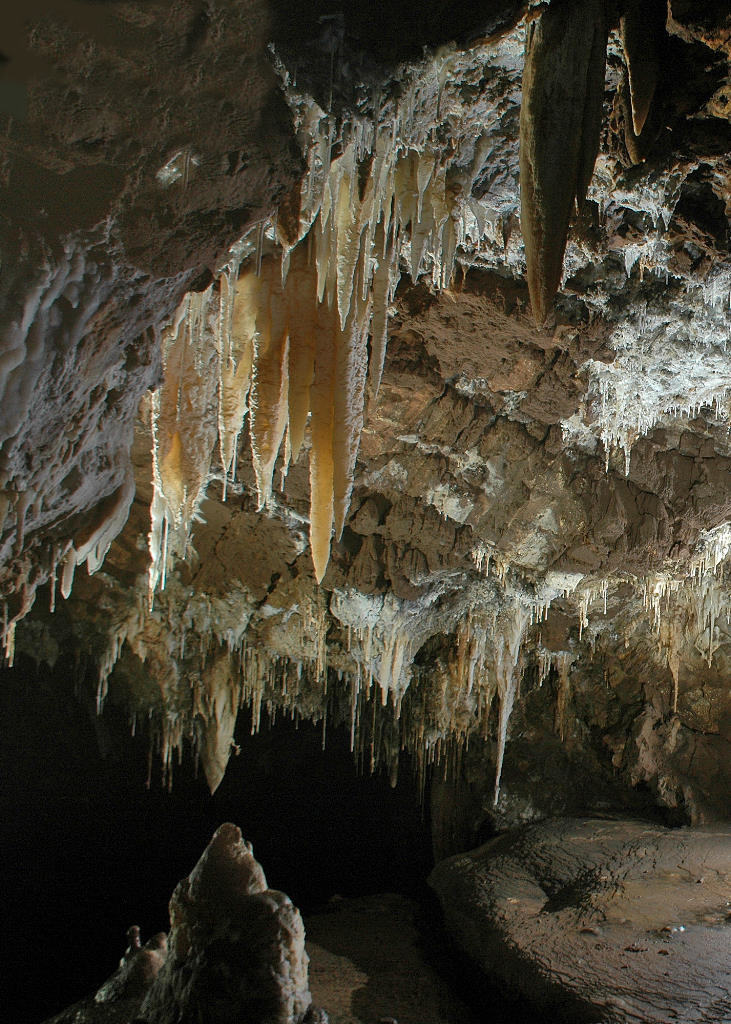
- Interactive map of California Cavern
- Location: Cave City, California
- Discovery: 1849 or 1850 by Captain Joseph Taylor
- Access: Show cave

California Historical Landmark
- Reference no.: 956

California Cavern is a limestone cave in the Sierra Nevada foothills, in Cave City, Calaveras County, California.

The series of interconnected caverns are one of the earliest officially recorded caves in the Mother Lode region of California. Although one of numerous caves in the Mother Lode region, California Caverns claims the distinction of having the most extensive system of caverns and passageways.

== History ==
The cave was discovered by Captain Joseph Taylor (on land originally claimed by James B. McKinney for gold mining) in 1849. He opened it for public tours, making it the first show cave in California. James McKinney originally named it Mammoth Cave in remembrance of mammoth caverns near his hometown in Kentucky. but by 1894 it was known as Cave City. The cave was originally used as a shelter during harsh winters. It was soon then after used for meetings attended by the townspeople as well as boasting the occasional whiskey bar, wedding or church service. Tours were well established by 1853. Then forward referred to as "the tour of lights" guests were charged varied amounts, they would then be given a candle and a nail and were admitted into the cave. The nail was given to guests so they could carve their name and date into the walls of the cave. This resulted in the over 5,000 historic signatures visible in the cave today. During some downtime while not prospecting for gold, local folklore affirms Captain Taylor found the entrance to the cave by accident while setting up target practice.

California Cavern was the first to be operated as a tourist attraction in the Sierras. Early visitors included Bret Harte, Mark Twain, and John Muir, who wrote about his visit in his 1894 book, The Mountains of California.

The caverns are registered as California Historical Landmark #956.

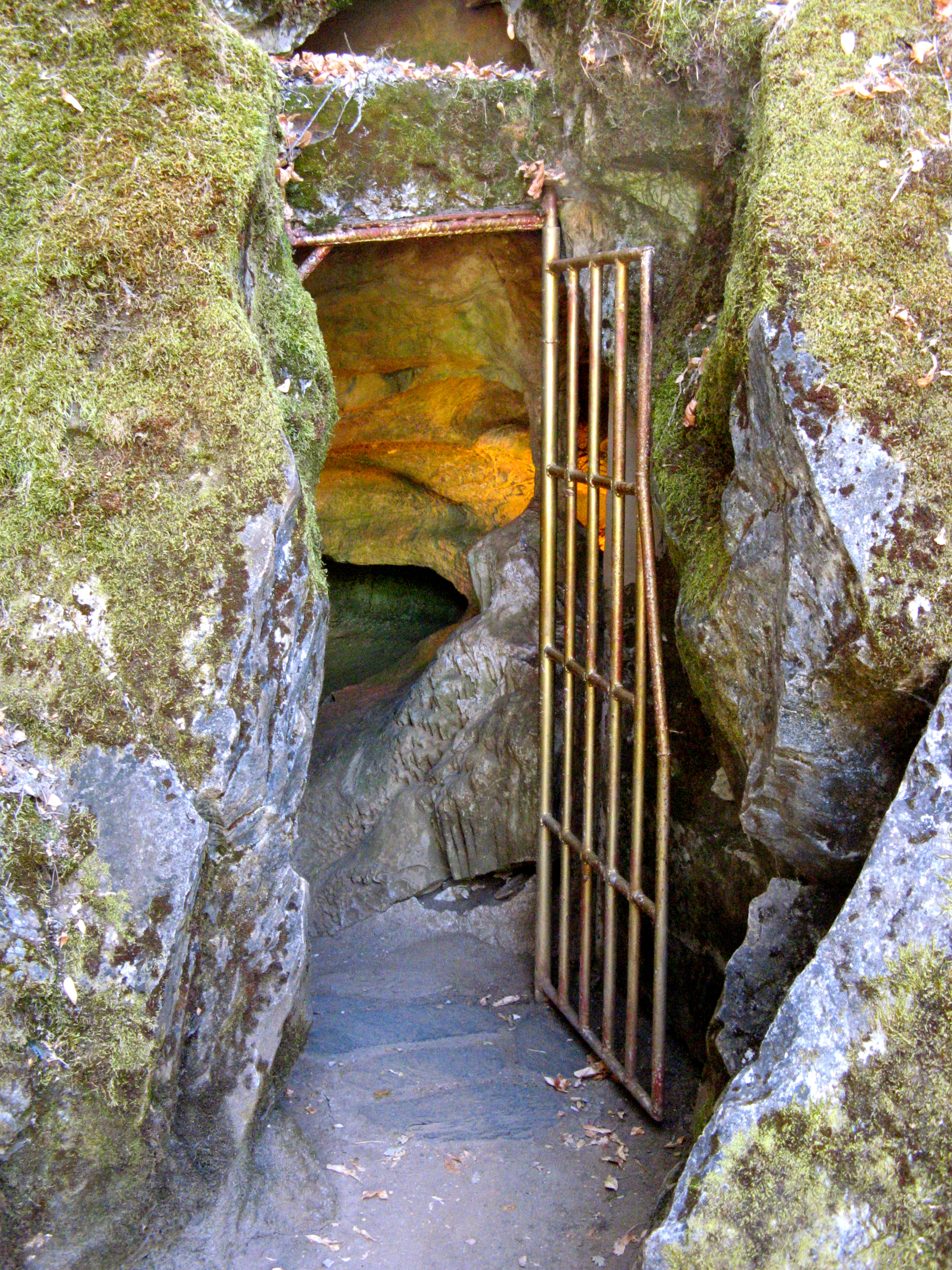
Entrance to the California Caverns

As of 2018, the cavern was operated as a show cave by Sierra Nevada Recreation Corporation.

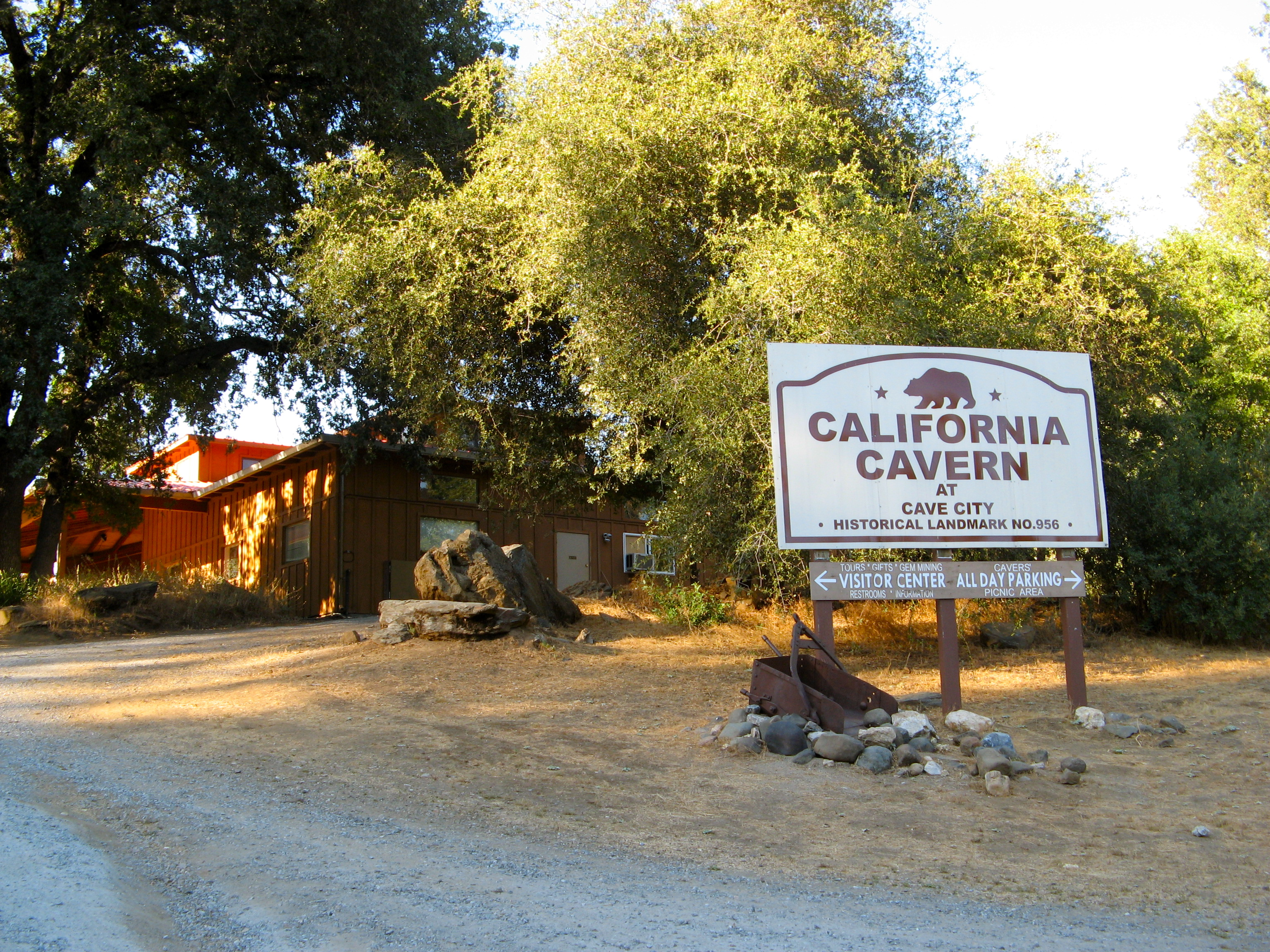
The Visitor center for the California Caverns, located nearby the Caverns.
