= Railroad Flat =

Railroad Flat may refer to:

- Railroad apartment
- Rail Road Flat, California
