= Cave City, California =

Unincorporated community in California, United States

Cave City
- Unincorporated community
- Location in California Cave City (the United States)
- Coordinates: 38°12′09″N 120°30′31″W
- Country: United States
- State: California
- County: Calaveras
- Elevation: 1,621 ft (494 m)

Cave City is an unincorporated community in Calaveras County, California, United States. It lies at an elevation of 1,617 feet (493 m) and is located at 38°12′09″N 120°30′31″W. The community is served by ZIP code 95222 and area code 209.

Like most communities in Calaveras County, Cave City began as a mining town. It was an important placer gold mining site in the 1850s, and at its peak had hundreds of residents, a hotel, a store, and one of the few schools in Calaveras County. The population quickly declined, and by the 1950s no structures remained. Today it is the location of the California Caverns, the most extensive system of caverns and passageways in the area.

== Politics ==
In the state legislature, Cave City is in the 8th senatorial district, represented by Democrat Angelique Ashby, and the 5th Assembly district, represented by Republican Joe Patterson. Federally, Cave City is in California's 4th congressional district, represented by Democrat Mike Thompson.
