= Forest Meadows, California =

Forest Meadows
- Unincorporated Community; Census Designated Place
- Location in Calaveras County and the state of California

- Location in the United States
- Coordinates: 38°10′05″N 120°24′20″W
- Country: United States
- State: California
- County: Calaveras

Area
  - Total: 3.764 sq mi (9.750 km^{2})
  - Land: 3.764 sq mi (9.750 km^{2})
  - Water: 0 sq mi (0 km^{2}) 0%
- Elevation: 3,376 ft (1,029 m)

Population (2020)
  - Total: 1,276
  - Density: 339.0/sq mi (130.9/km^{2})
- Time zone: UTC-8 (Pacific (PST))
  - Summer (DST): UTC-7 (PDT)
- ZIP code: 95247
- Area code: 209
- FIPS code: 06-24897
- GNIS feature IDs: 1804875, 2408228

Forest Meadows is a census-designated place (CDP) in Calaveras County, California, United States. The population was 1,276 at the 2020 census, up from 1,249 at the 2010 census.

== Geography ==
According to the United States Census Bureau, the CDP has a total area of 3.8 square miles (9.8 km^{2}), all land.

Brice Station is not inside the Forest Meadows HOA.

== Demographics ==
Historical population
Census	Pop.	Note	%±
2000	1,197		—
2010	1,249		4.3%
2020	1,276		2.2%
U.S. Decennial Census; 1860–1870 1880-1890; 1900 1910 1920; 1930 1940 1950; 1960 1970 1980; 1990 2000 2010

Forest Meadows first appeared as a census designated place in the 2000 U.S. census.

=== Racial and ethnic composition ===
Forest Meadows CDP, California – Racial and ethnic composition Note: the US Census treats Hispanic/Latino as an ethnic category. This table excludes Latinos from the racial categories and assigns them to a separate category. Hispanics/Latinos may be of any race.
Race / Ethnicity (NH = Non-Hispanic)	Pop 2000	Pop 2010	Pop 2020	% 2000	% 2010	% 2020
White alone (NH)	1,115	1,155	1,055	93.15%	92.47%	82.68%
Black or African American alone (NH)	0	0	1	0.00%	0.00%	0.08%
Native American or Alaska Native alone (NH)	18	3	19	1.50%	0.24%	1.49%
Asian alone (NH)	7	9	22	0.58%	0.72%	1.72%
Native Hawaiian or Pacific Islander alone (NH)	0	0	1	0.00%	0.00%	0.08%
Other race alone (NH)	0	0	16	0.00%	0.00%	1.25%
Mixed race or Multiracial (NH)	14	22	63	1.17%	1.76%	4.94%
Hispanic or Latino (any race)	43	60	99	3.59%	4.80%	7.76%
Total	1,197	1,249	1,276	100.00%	100.00%	100.00%

=== 2020 census ===
As of the 2020 census, Forest Meadows had a population of 1,276, and the population density was 339.0 inhabitants per square mile (130.9/km^{2}).

The age distribution was 190 people (14.9%) under the age of 18, 56 people (4.4%) aged 18 to 24, 204 people (16.0%) aged 25 to 44, 335 people (26.3%) aged 45 to 64, and 491 people (38.5%) who were 65 years of age or older. The median age was 58.6 years. For every 100 females, there were 101.3 males. For every 100 females age 18 and over, there were 98.2 males age 18 and over.

The whole population lived in households. There were 563 households, out of which 89 (15.8%) had children under the age of 18 living in them, 332 (59.0%) were married-couple households, 30 (5.3%) were cohabiting couple households, 126 (22.4%) had a female householder with no partner present, and 75 (13.3%) had a male householder with no partner present. 144 households (25.6%) were one person, and 82 (14.6%) were one person aged 65 or older. The average household size was 2.27. There were 390 families (69.3% of all households).

There were 828 housing units at an average density of 220.0 units per square mile (84.9 units/km^{2}), of which 563 (68.0%) were occupied and 265 (32.0%) were vacant. Of the occupied units, 456 (81.0%) were owner-occupied and 107 (19.0%) were occupied by renters. The homeowner vacancy rate was 2.9% and the rental vacancy rate was 9.7%.

0.0% of residents lived in urban areas, while 100.0% lived in rural areas.

== Politics ==
In the state legislature, Forest Meadows is in the 4th senatorial district, represented by Republican Marie Alvarado-Gil, and the 8th Assembly district, represented by Republican David Tangipa. Federally, Forest Meadows is in California's 5th congressional district, represented by Republican Tom McClintock.
