= New Hogan Lake =

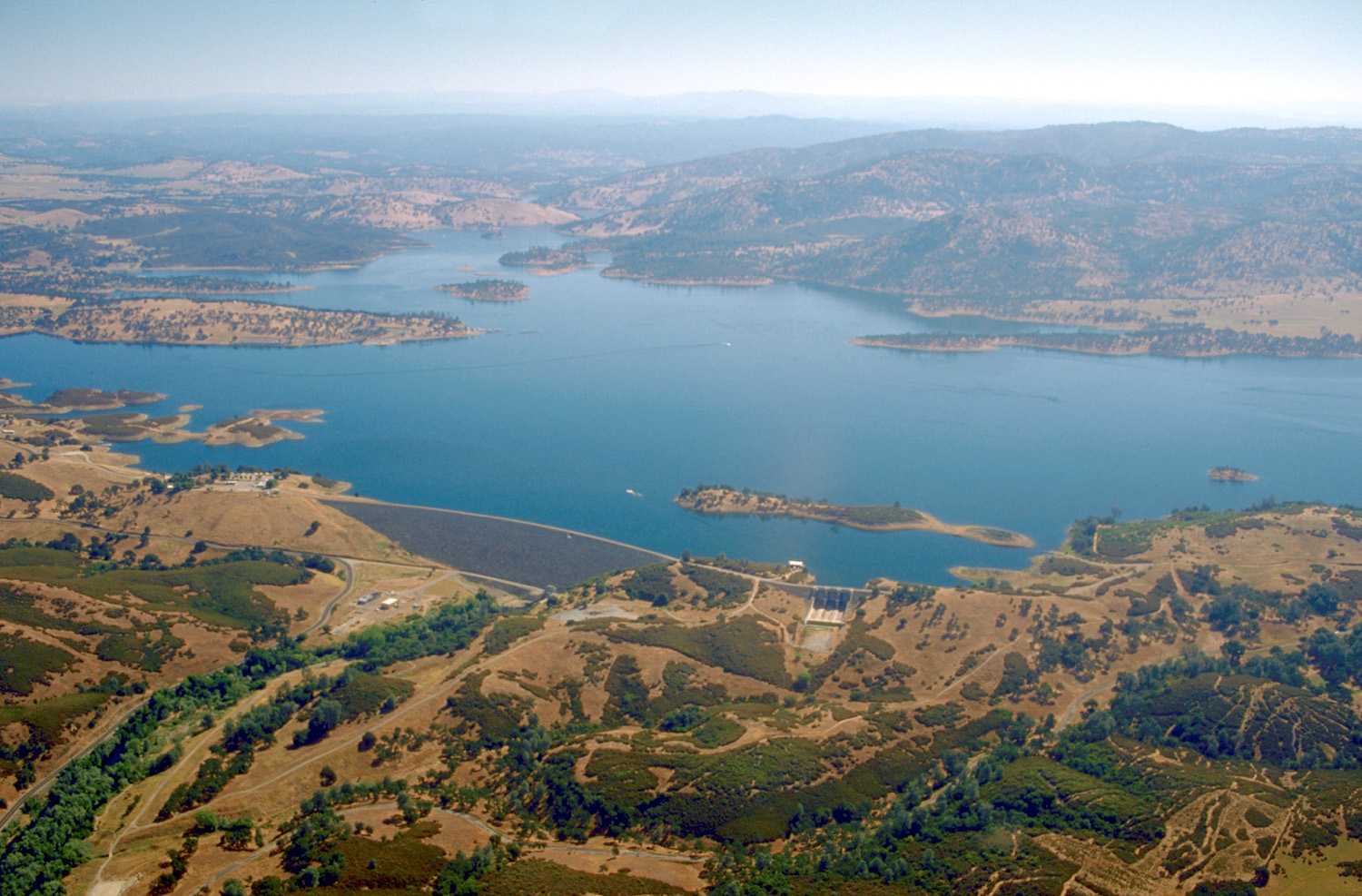
- Aerial view of lake and dam. View to the northeast

- Location within California Location within the United States
- Location: Sierra Nevada Mountains; Calaveras County, California
- Coordinates: 38.1507°N 120.8129°W
- Lake type: Reservoir
- Primary inflows: Calaveras River
- Primary outflows: Calaveras River
- Catchment area: 363 square miles (940 km^{2})
- Basin countries: United States
- Max. length: 3 miles (4.8 km)
- Max. width: 2 miles (3.2 km)
- Surface area: 4,410 acres (1,780 ha)
- Water volume: 317,000 acre-feet (391,000,000 m^{3})
- Surface elevation: 666 feet (203 m)
- References: "New Hogan Lake". Geographic Names Information System. United States Geological Survey, United States Department of the Interior.

New Hogan Lake is an artificial lake in the foothills of the Sierra Nevada in Calaveras County, California, about 30 miles (48.3 km) northeast of Stockton. It is formed by New Hogan Dam on the Calaveras River, whose North and South forks combine just upstream of the lake, and has a capacity of 317,000 acre⋅ft (391,000,000 m^{3})or 103,290,974,258 gallons. The earth-fill dam, completed in 1963, is 210 feet (64.0 m) high from the crest of the dam to the original streambed. The reservoir was first filled in 1965. There is a small hydroelectric plant at its base. It is owned by the United States Army Corps of Engineers and provides flood protection, drinking water, electricity and water for irrigation. There is also recreation available, such as boating, fishing, water skiing and camping.

== History ==
The original Hogan Dam was completed in September 1930 and named for Walter Byron Hogan -- a Stockton, California City Engineer and later City Manager.

New Hogan Lake and New Hogan Dam are the successors of the original 1930 Hogan Lake and Hogan Dam. The dam was constructed as a response to flooding of the Calaveras River which caused problems for the City of Stockton, California. It was and is still the only dam on the Calaveras River. The original Hogan dam was deemed ineffective when floods reoccurred in the 1950s. These problems with flooding led to the construction of the New Hogan Dam and New Hogan Lake by the Army Corps of Engineers who manage the lake for flood control and recreational purposes. The new Lake and Dam were built between 1960 and 1963 and now supply irrigation and drinking water to the Calaveras County Water District and Stockton East Water District, in addition to serving as a recreational area. The New Hogan Dam also backs up supplies necessary for the New Hogan Powerhouse generation facilities, a 3.15 MW capacity facility operating under Federal Energy Regulation Commission project license number 2903.

== Recreational uses ==
New Lake Hogan Reservoir is known for its accessibility to many out-door activities. There are multiple launch ramps for boat and jet-ski users to deposit their water-crafts into the reservoir, and enjoy activities such as water-skiing, wake boarding, tubing, canoeing, sailing and fishing. The lake has two primary camp grounds for the adventure type, Acorn and Oak Knoll. Acorn campground is a 128-campsite facility which includes, coin-operated showers, flushable toilets, and accessible drinking water. Oak Knoll is a more discrete site with no showers, offering 49 campsites. Oak Knoll is located just northeast of the Acorn camp, and remains closed during New Hogan Lake's off season. Other sites offer boat-in, and group camp options as well. Multiple day-use areas are available surrounding the lake including, Fiddle-neck, Bay Creek, Whiskey Creek, Slate Creek, and Wrinkle Cove. Wrinkle Cove is a free day-use area, accompanied with benches, and grills for those who would like to enjoy a nice day at the lake, but many not have a water-craft vehicle that allows them to do so. Many people gather here to enjoy swimming, and floating in the reservoir. There are many accessible locations for fishing both on, and off-shore, with a variety of fish to catch. Hiking, horseback riding, and biking are other popular recreational activities at the lake. Located at the Monte Vista Recreation area you can find the popular "River of Skulls" hiking trail, this among other trails can be found surrounding the lake. In 2012 the lake added two 18-hole disc golf courses for players to come and enjoy the rugged terrain. The western course offers holes right along the waters edge, with numerous water hazards. A wonderful event which happens each year at the lake, in Valley Springs, is the Fourth of July fireworks show. This show is put on by the Valley Springs Boosters Club, is supervised by volunteers of the Cal Fire District, and falls on the Saturday closest to the forth.

The California Office of Environmental Health Hazard Assessment (OEHHA) has developed a safe eating advisory for fish caught in New Hogan Lake based on levels of mercury or PCBs found in the fish species.

== Ecology ==
New Lake Hogan Reservoir provides habitats for species both on-shore and off-shore. Several bird species exist within the lakes borders, some including quail, dove, waterfowl, and wild turkey, all of which are available to hunt within specified areas. Other birds which are for viewing purposes only include vultures, bald and golden eagles, osprey, hawks, ducks, and geese. Several species of fish can also be found within the lake and the connecting Calaveras River, including Central Valley (Spring) Chinook salmon (Oncorhynchus tshawytscha), Central Valley steelhead (Oncorhynchus mykiss), Coastal rainbow trout (Oncorhynchus my kiss irideus), hardhead (Mylopharodon conocephalus), Prickly sculpin (Cottus asper subspecies), Riffle sculpin (Cottus gloss), Sacramento blackfish (Orthodox microlepidotus), Sacramento pike minnow (Ptychocheilus grands), and Sacramento sucker (Catostomus occidentals). Chinook salmon have experienced extreme declines in populations since to establishment of dams in California. The Calaveras River in particular has had a hug impact on this decline. Improvements on these waters ways done by CALFED's East Side Delta Tributaries Ecological Management, seek to improve the conditions of these species, as well as the Central Valley steelhead trout. Species of fish that are commonly caught within the lakes borders include striped bass, black bass, catfish, bluegill, and crappie. Blacktail deer can often be spotted near the shores of the lake, as well as cottontail rabbits, mice, raccoon, striped skunk, gophers, coyotes, mountain lions, grey fox, bob cats, and moles. It is important while hiking, biking, or camping to be aware of Rattlesnakes, which are often found near the lake and surrounding areas. These along with other snake species are commonly spotted.

== Calaveras River Water Supply System ==
The Calaveras river is made up primarily of naturally running water ways, and within its watershed New Lake Hogan and White Pines Lake are the primary water supply reservoirs, with the exception of a few smaller ones located upstream. The watershed has three water testing plants, two of which test water directly from the Calaveras River. Those testing sights are Jenny Lind and Dr. Joe Waidhofer, both located just below New Lake Hogan Reservoir. The dam affects the quality of the water and the flows of the Calaveras River past its point of location, which are controlled by the Stockton East Water District and the United States Army Corps of Engineers. The lake itself provides the main storage for the river, storing up to 317,100 AF, and is centrally located within the watershed. The powerhouse located at the base of the dam is controlled by Modesto Irrigation district, but is licensed by the Federal Regulatory Energy Commission which the Calaveras County Water District holds the rights to.

== Drought Impacts ==
The recent drought (2014–2015) has had a major impact on New Hogan Lake. In January 2013 New Hogan Lake was about half full and the water steadily decreased to about one third full in January 2014 and 16% full in January 2015 It is one of the hardest hit reservoirs in Northern California with record lows recorded in September 2014 when the lake was 14% full, which was the lowest it had been since January 1995. Significant rain events in February 2015 supplied New Hogan with a large amount of water but did not help the reservoir get back to capacity.

The drought has had some major impacts on district the lake serves as well. In response to the record drought levels in 2015, the Stockton East Water District warned farmers that they may not receive water. The utility deemed that there will be enough water for the City of Stockton with help from the New Melones Dam but not enough for all farmers. Due to low levels, notices were distributed about giving priority to farmers with riparian rights

== Jenny Lind Water Treatment Plant ==
Just one mile down river from the New Lake Hogan Reservoir is the Jenny Lind Water Treatment Plant, which can be found three miles South of Valley Springs where the lakes entrance is located. The treatment plant is operated by the Calaveras County Water District, serving a population of 9,592 people. The plant has a capacity of 6 million gallons per day (MGD). The facility pumps raw water directly from the river to the treatment plant, where purification begins; this is done through the use of gravity. The recent Butte Fire caused major concerns for the water quality within the Calaveras River water system. To mitigate the issues the district applied for a grant from the California Office of Emergency Services (Cal-OES) and Federal Emergency Management Agency (FEMA) Hazard Mitigation Grant Program, which has been approved and scheduled for completion in 2018. The new facility will be a 3.75 million dollar project.

== See also ==
- List of lakes in California
- List of largest reservoirs of California
- List of reservoirs and dams in California
