= Moaning Cavern =

Solutional cave and tourist attraction in the Calaveras County, California

38°04′08″N 120°27′58″W / 38.0690105°N 120.4660284°W / 38.0690105; -120.4660284

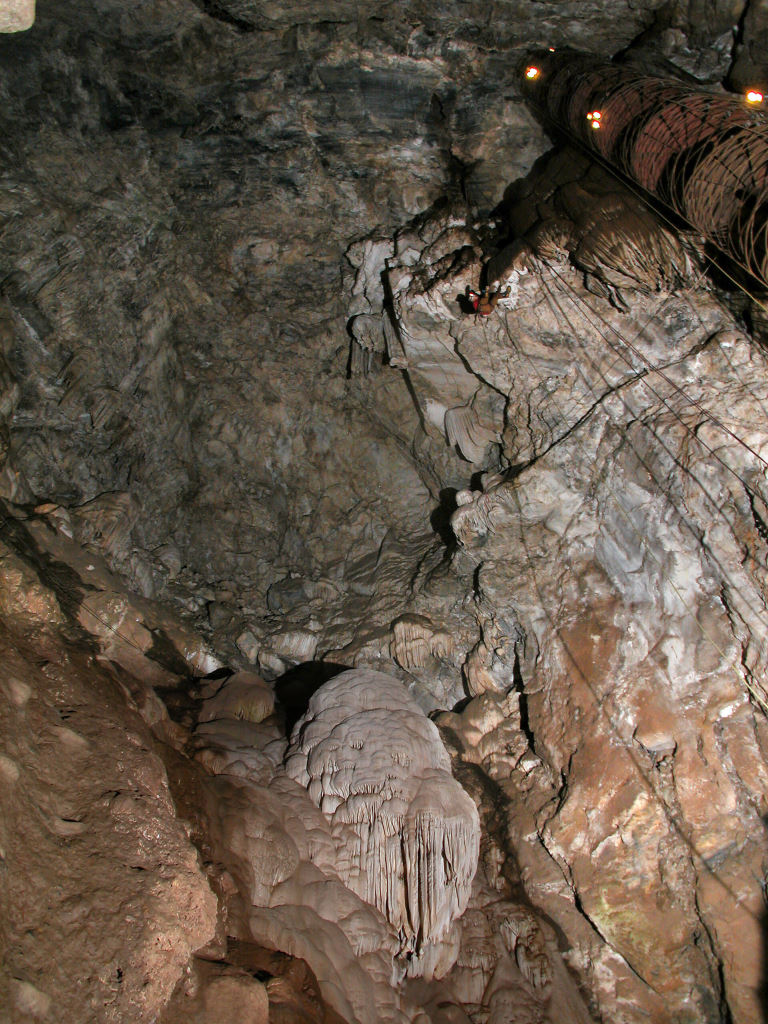
Moaning Cave from the bottom of the shaft

Moaning Caverns is a solutional cave located in Calaveras County, California, near Vallecito, California in the heart of the state's Gold Country. Moaning Cave is a vertical solution cavity and dome pit which developed along a fracture in metamorphosed limestone. It is part of the Calaveras Complex of the Sierra Nevada foothills. The largest room in the cave is over 37 metres (121 ft) tall. Today the cave serves as a tourist attraction in Northern California. It is open to the public for walking tours and spelunking. Including the off-trail areas, the cave reaches a depth of 410 feet (124 m). The portion of the cave developed for tourists consists of a spacious vertical shaft 165 feet tall, which is descended by a combination of stairs and a unique 100-foot-high (30 m) spiral staircase built in the early 1900s.

The cave was first described on December 7, 1851 in the Daily Alta California. A variety of artifacts were located in the cave, including human remains and detritus. It gets its name from the moaning sound that echoed out of the cave, however expansion of the opening to allow access for the public disrupted the sounds.

== History of the cave ==
Moaning Caverns is also an archaeological site. Archaeologist Phil C. Orr, located human remains under speleothem mineral deposits in the cave. Those deposits were estimated to be about 12,000 years old. Many other human bones in these caves, some of them from the more recent periods, have also been located. Archeologists are unsure of how some of the human remains arrived in the cave due to their varying age, the differences in the local customs for the Miwok (who did not use caves to bury their dead) and the fact that in 1922, owner Addison Carly had leveled the cave for the comfort of tourists.

=== Tourism in the cavern ===
Access to the cavern is permitted by guided tour only. Moaning Caverns is home to the largest single cave chamber open to the public in California. The massive room reaches over 180 feet before funneling into smaller passageways. There are two natural entrances into the chamber. The first in the form of a 45-foot vertical chimney dropping into the center of the room; the second entrance is a narrow crack in the earth which was enlarged to permit commercial entry into the cavern beginning in 1920. Today only the secondary passageway and staircase are used to enter the cave. The original main entrance is still visible at the start of the tour. The cave features a distinct spiral staircase. Below the gift shop, a set of wooden stairs leads 65 feet (20 m) down to a platform. From the platform, a spiral staircase leads all the way to the floor of the chamber, 165 ft (50 m) below the gift shop.

The main chamber extends the first one-third of the cave's total depth. Beyond that, the cave continues down more narrow passageways to a total depth of 410 ft (120 m). The cave's "Expedition Tour" covers a portion of the passageways below. It requires crawling on hands and knees, and even stretching out to lie flat and wiggle, for several hours. The crawling tour travels roughly 70 ft (21 m) below the floor of the main chamber through several narrow passageways named the "Meat Grinder, Pancake Squeeze, Birth Canal", and finally climb up and out of "Santa's Worst Nightmare" (a 30 ft (9.1 m) chimney). Moaning Caverns used to offer a zip line and rock climbing wall on the surface above the cave, but as of 2019 these activities are no longer available. Both were replaced with a gold panning water trough and cornhole. Rappelling into the cavern via the original entrance was an activity offered between 1984 and 2017, but is no longer available.

== Pictures from the cavern ==
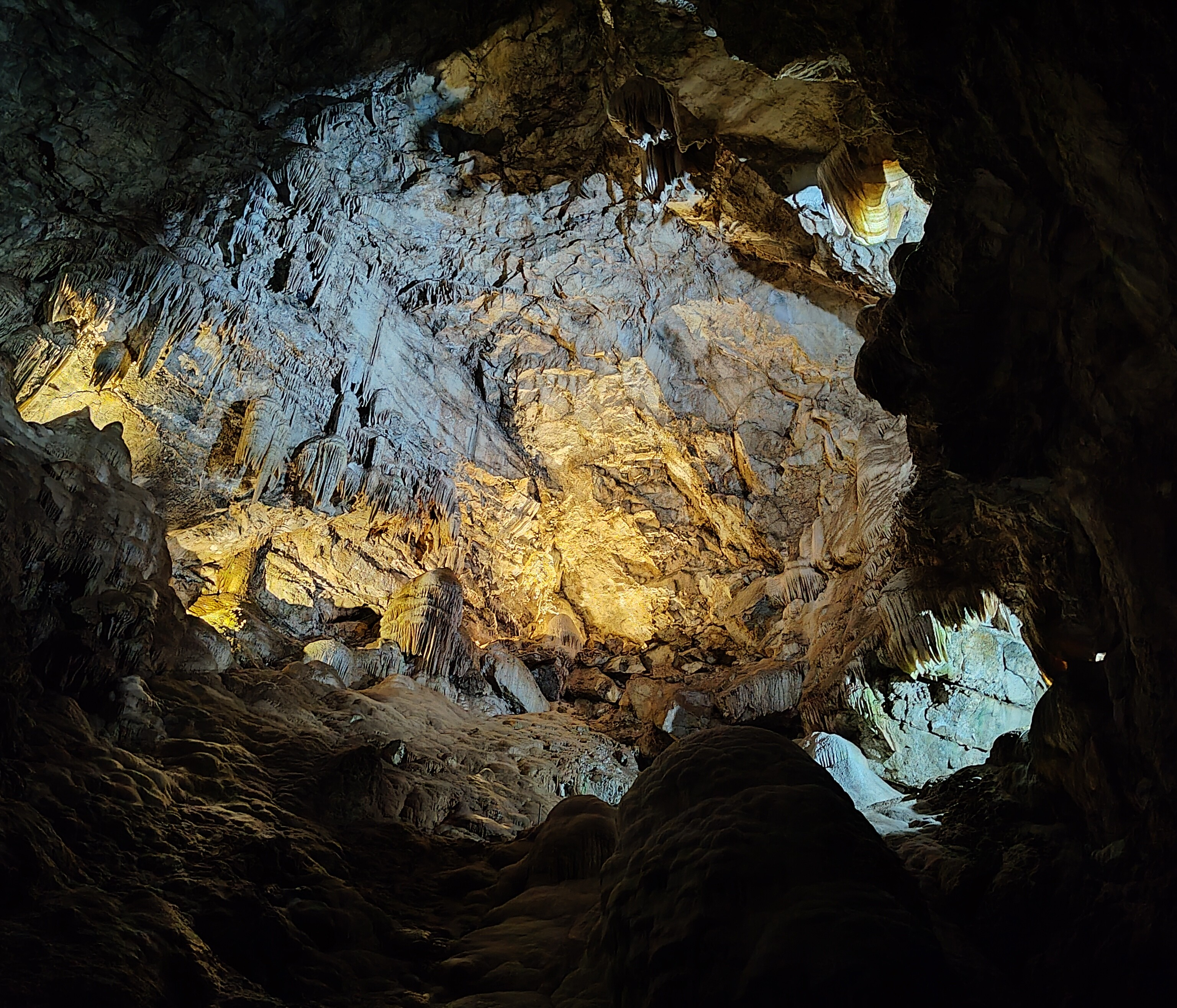
Moaning Cavern's "cathedral" feature

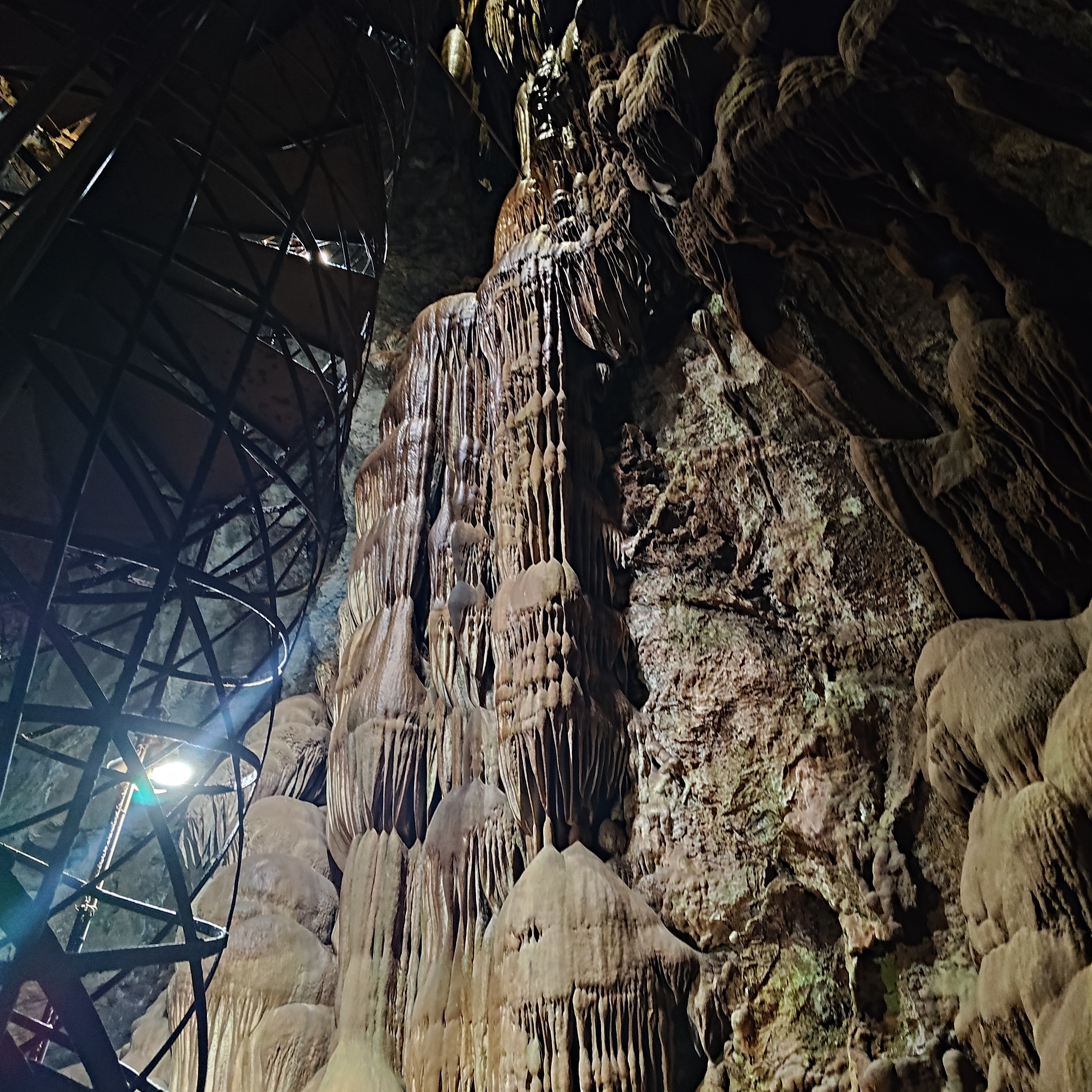
Moaning Cavern's so-called "chocolate fountain"

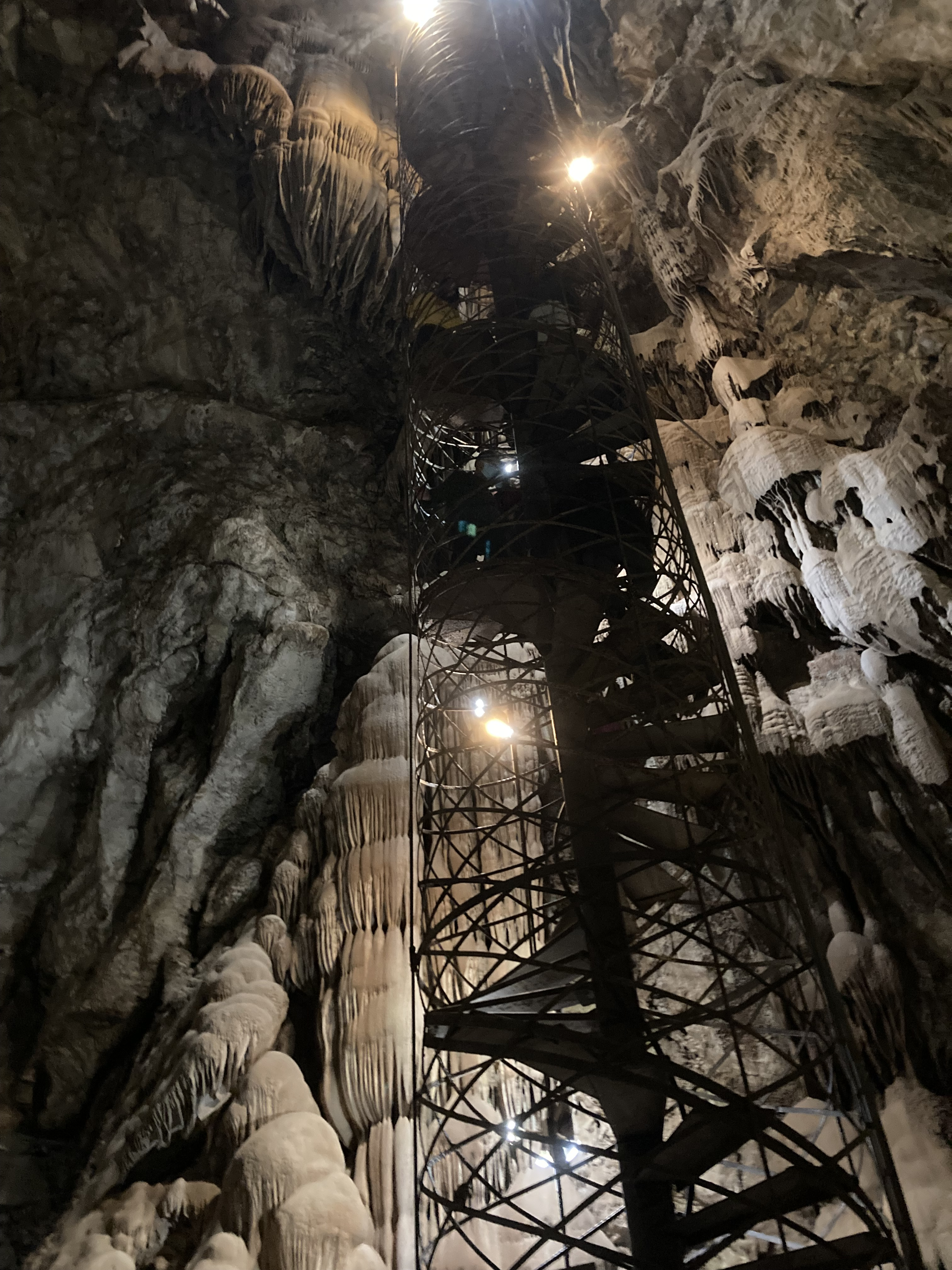
The distinct spiral staircase in the cave
