= Calaveras County Courthouse =

- U.S. National Register of Historic Places
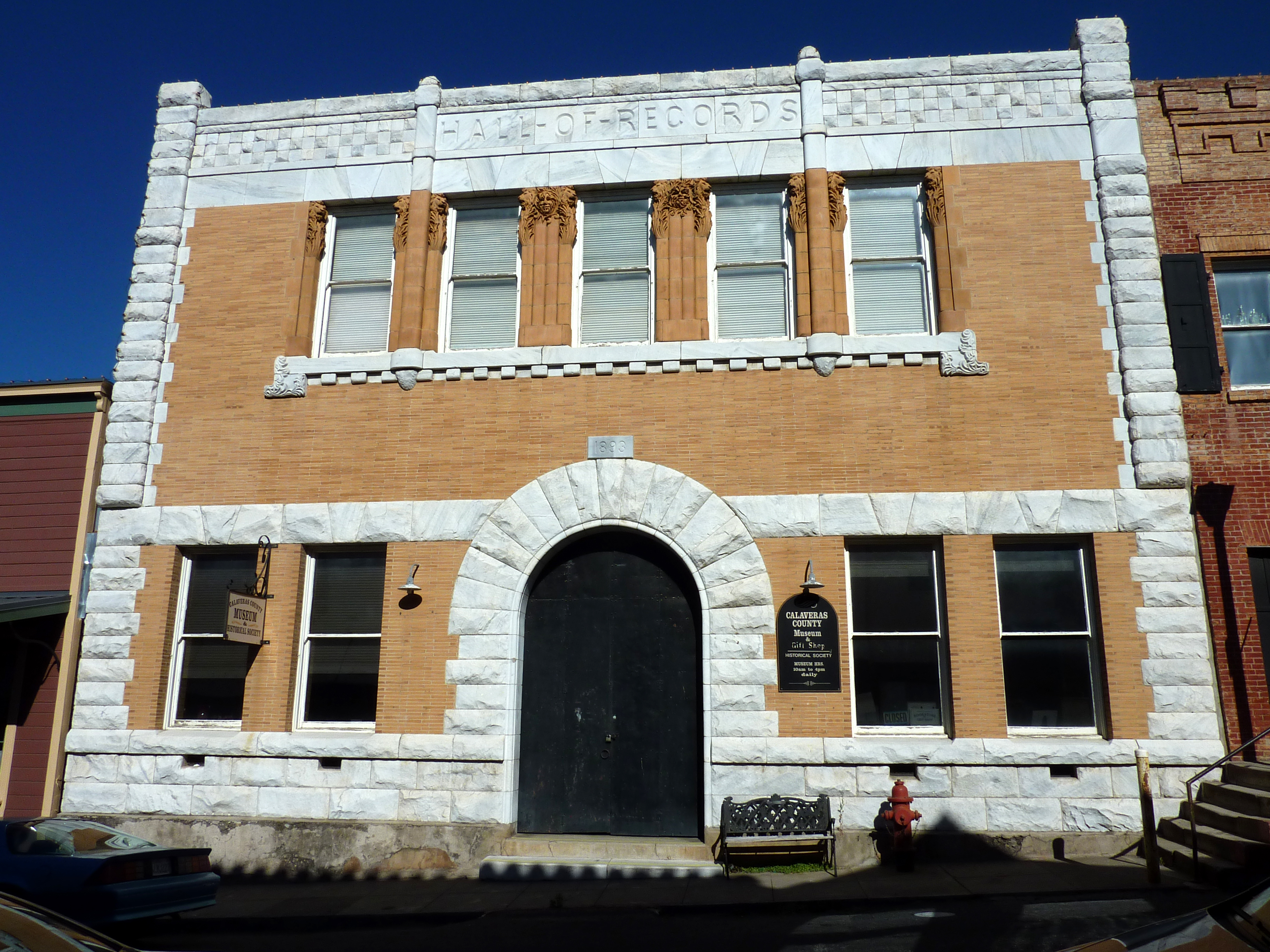
- The 1893 Hall of Records building

- Location within California Location within the United States
- Location: Main St., San Andreas, California
- Coordinates: 38°11′48″N 120°40′45″W
- Area: 0.5 acres (0.20 ha)
- Built: 1867
- NRHP reference No.: 72000221
- Added to NRHP: February 28, 1972

The Calaveras County Courthouse is a historic courthouse built in 1867 in San Andreas, California. The brick courthouse contained the county's courtroom, jail, and sheriff's office; until 1888, executions were also conducted in the building. The building's jail held outlaw Black Bart, a notorious Northern California highwayman, during his 1883 trial. The county's Hall of Records was built in front of the courthouse in 1893; the two buildings nearly touch and are considered part of the same complex.

In 1966, after moving its court operations to a new building, the county turned over the 1867/1893 courthouse complex to the Calaveras County Historical Society, which now operates it as the Calaveras County Museum.

The Calaveras County Courthouse was added to the National Register of Historic Places on February 28, 1972.

In 2008, volunteers restored the remains of the first courthouse in Calaveras county -- the Double Springs Courthouse of 1850-1851, which was a China house originally assembled by Chinese carpenters out of Canton-made camphor wood panels that interlocked without the use of nails -- and placed it on display inside the Museum.

== See also ==
- California Historical Landmarks in Calaveras County
- Calaveras County Superior Court
- Double Springs, California
