= Dorrington, California =

Dorrington
- Unincorporated Community; Census Designated Place
- Location in Calaveras County and the state of California

- Location in the United States
- Coordinates: 38°18′05″N 120°16′38″W
- Country: United States
- State: California
- County: Calaveras

Area
  - Total: 4.10 sq mi (10.61 km^{2})
  - Land: 4.09 sq mi (10.60 km^{2})
  - Water: 0.0039 sq mi (0.01 km^{2}) 0.14%
- Elevation: 4,767 ft (1,453 m)

Population (2020)
  - Total: 519
  - Density: 126.8/sq mi (48.96/km^{2})
- Time zone: UTC-8 (Pacific (PST))
  - Summer (DST): UTC-7 (PDT)
- ZIP code: 95223
- Area code: 209
- FIPS code: 06-19570
- GNIS feature IDs: 1656306, 2408683

Dorrington is a census-designated place (CDP) in Calaveras County, California, United States. The population was 519 at the 2020 census, down from 609 at the 2010 census. Originally known as Cold Spring Ranch until 1902 (because of an icy spring), the town sits on State Route 4 and historically was a stopping point along the toll road between Murphys and Ebbetts Pass, often serving as a resort for visitors to what is now Calaveras Big Trees State Park. Dorrington is also home to the second largest Sugar Pine in the world, measuring 32 feet (9.7 m) in circumference and 220 feet (67 m) tall. The name Dorrington comes from the maiden name of Rebecca (Dorrington) Gardner.

== Geography ==
According to the United States Census Bureau, the CDP has a total area of 4.1 square miles (11 km^{2}), 99.88% of it land. The elevation is 4,800 feet ASL.

== History ==
Originally known as Cold Springs Ranch, the town's name changed upon establishment of the post office in 1902. The name Dorrington comes from the maiden name of Rebecca (Dorrington) Gardner. Famed naturalist John Muir visited a large Sugar Pine Tree here on August 22, 1900, with C. Hart Merriam and Florence Merriam Bailey on a trip between Lake Tahoe and Yosemite. The post office was discontinued in 1919, but re-established in 1921 and closed for good in 1934.

== Logging ==
Logging and timber harvesting have been part of the economic and cultural landscape around Dorrington since the late nineteenth century. Following the California Gold Rush, demand for timber to support mining infrastructure — including flumes, mill construction, bridges, and fuel — increased across the Sierra Nevada foothills and mid‑elevation forests. Sawmills and logging operations were established in many parts of Calaveras County, and by the 1890s through the 1940s, logging had become a significant local industry, with small sawmills operating in forested mountain areas to supply timber for regional markets and mining needs. This expansion occurred as land previously claimed under the Timber and Stone Act was acquired for timber harvesting and settlement, allowing vast tracts of timbered land to be converted into economic resources. Although Dorrington itself was never a major company town like some nearby communities, it served as one of the waystations and service points for workers, stockmen, and travelers connected to the broader forest economy. In nearby areas such as Blue Mountain and White Pines, sawmills, timber camps, and logging‑related infrastructure contributed to the local forest economy well into the 20th century, with timber trucked to mills outside the county as industrial sawmills within Calaveras County declined in number. Logging continues in the forests surrounding Dorrington under regulated practices today, but the industry has largely shifted away from local milling toward transportation of timber to distant processing facilities.

== Demographics ==
Historical population
Census	Pop.	Note	%±
2000	727		—
2010	609		−16.2%
2020	519		−14.8%
U.S. Decennial Census; 1860–1870 1880-1890; 1900 1910 1920; 1930 1940 1950; 1960 1970 1980; 1990 2000 2010

Dorrington first appeared as a census designated place in the 2000 U.S. census.

=== 2020 census ===
Dorrington CDP, California – Racial and ethnic composition Note: the US Census treats Hispanic/Latino as an ethnic category. This table excludes Latinos from the racial categories and assigns them to a separate category. Hispanics/Latinos may be of any race.
Race / Ethnicity (NH = Non-Hispanic)	Pop 2000	Pop 2010	Pop 2020	% 2000	% 2010	% 2020
White alone (NH)	664	550	428	91.33%	90.31%	82.47%
Black or African American alone (NH)	3	0	3	0.41%	0.00%	0.58%
Native American or Alaska Native alone (NH)	1	2	4	0.14%	0.33%	0.77%
Asian alone (NH)	2	10	15	0.28%	1.64%	2.89%
Native Hawaiian or Pacific Islander alone (NH)	0	1	0	0.00%	0.16%	0.00%
Other race alone (NH)	3	0	2	0.41%	0.00%	0.39%
Mixed race or Multiracial (NH)	15	13	22	2.06%	2.13%	4.24%
Hispanic or Latino (any race)	39	33	45	5.36%	5.42%	8.67%
Total	727	609	519	100.00%	100.00%	100.00%

The 2020 United States census reported that Dorrington had a population of 519. The population density was 126.8 inhabitants per square mile (49.0/km^{2}). The racial makeup of Dorrington was 435 (83.8%) White, 3 (0.6%) African American, 4 (0.8%) Native American, 16 (3.1%) Asian, 0 (0.0%) Pacific Islander, 11 (2.1%) from other races, and 50 (9.6%) from two or more races. Hispanic or Latino of any race were 45 persons (8.7%).

The whole population lived in households. There were 276 households, out of which 43 (15.6%) had children under the age of 18 living in them, 130 (47.1%) were married-couple households, 9 (3.3%) were cohabiting couple households, 52 (18.8%) had a female householder with no partner present, and 85 (30.8%) had a male householder with no partner present. 104 households (37.7%) were one person, and 51 (18.5%) were one person aged 65 or older. The average household size was 1.88. There were 163 families (59.1% of all households).

The age distribution was 43 people (8.3%) under the age of 18, 30 people (5.8%) aged 18 to 24, 68 people (13.1%) aged 25 to 44, 163 people (31.4%) aged 45 to 64, and 215 people (41.4%) who were 65 years of age or older. The median age was 61.0 years. For every 100 females, there were 143.7 males.

There were 1,746 housing units at an average density of 426.6 units per square mile (164.7 units/km^{2}), of which 276 (15.8%) were occupied. Of these, 233 (84.4%) were owner-occupied, and 43 (15.6%) were occupied by renters.

== Politics ==
In the state legislature, Dorrington is in the 4th senatorial district, represented by Republican Marie Alvarado-Gil, and the 8th Assembly district, represented by Republican David Tangipa. Federally, Dorrington is in California's 5th congressional district, represented by Republican Tom McClintock.
