= New Hogan Dam =

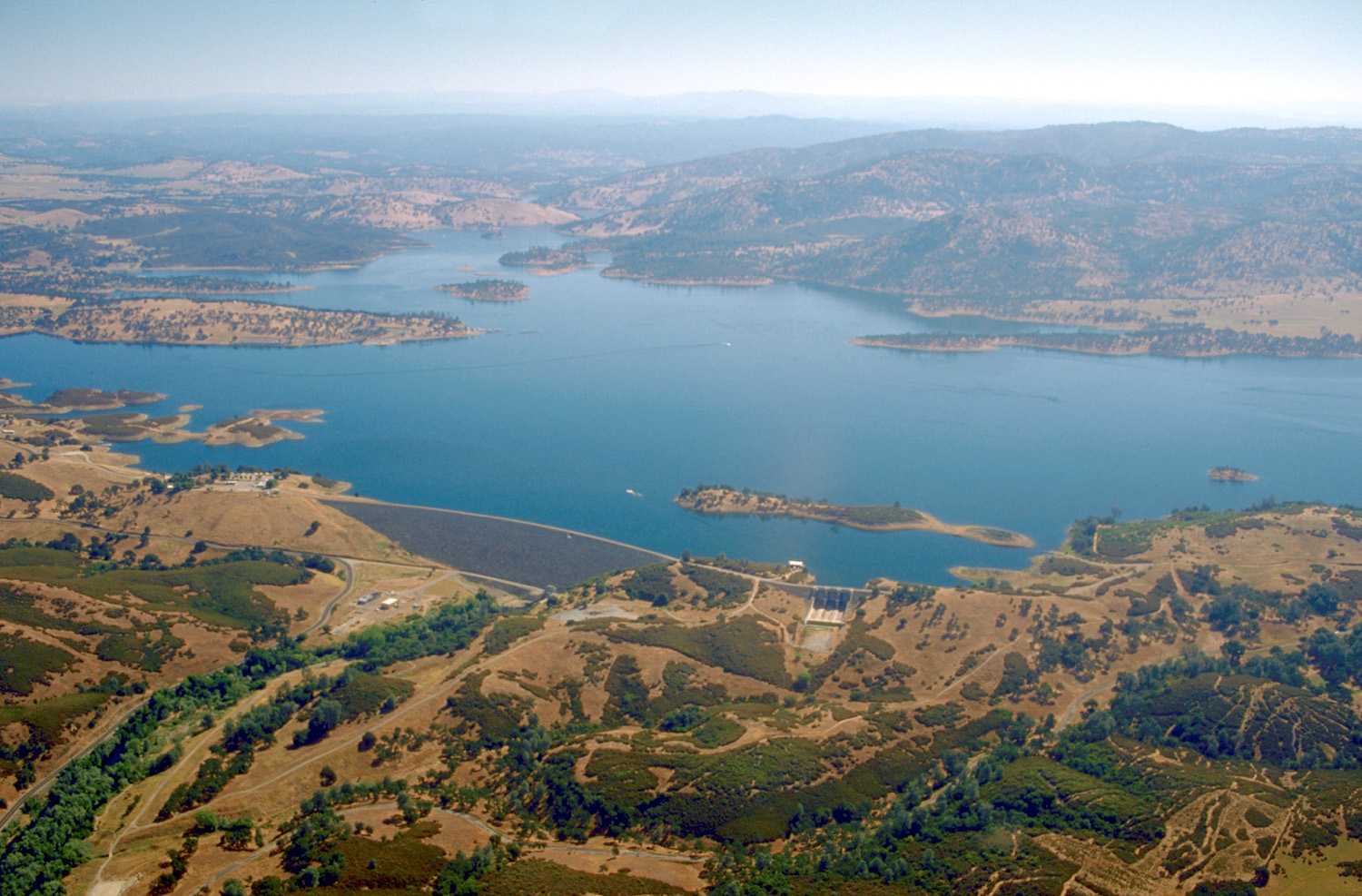
- Interactive map of New Hogan Dam
- Country: United States
- Location: Calaveras County, California
- Coordinates: 38°09′03″N 120°48′47″W
- Opening date: 1963; 63 years ago
- Owners: U.S. Army Corps of Engineers, Sacramento District

Dam and spillways
- Type of dam: Embankment
- Impounds: Calaveras River
- Height: 210 ft (64 m)
- Length: 1,960 ft (600 m)
- Spillway type: Gated overflow, service
- Spillway capacity: 106,400 cu ft/s (3,010 m^{3}/s)

Reservoir
- Creates: New Hogan Lake
- Total capacity: 317,100 acre⋅ft (0.3911 km^{3})
- Catchment area: 363 mi^{2} (940 km^{2})
- Surface area: 4,400 acres (1,800 ha)

Power Station
- Installed capacity: 3.15 MW

New Hogan Dam is an embankment dam on the Calaveras River, a tributary of the San Joaquin River in central California. The dam lies east of Rancho Calaveras and impounds New Hogan Lake in the foothills of the Sierra Nevada. Built by the U.S. Army Corps of Engineers (USACE), the 210-foot (64 m)-high dam was completed in 1963. In 1986, the Modesto Irrigation District contracted with the USACE to build a base load hydroelectric plant at the dam with a capacity of 3.15 megawatts.

The original Hogan Dam was completed in September 1930 and named for Walter Byron Hogan -- a Stockton, California City Engineer and later City Manager.

== See also ==
- List of lakes in California
- List of largest reservoirs of California
- List of reservoirs and dams in California
