= Rail Road Flat, California =

Rail Road Flat
- Unincorporated Community; Census Designated Place
- Location in Calaveras County and the state of California

- Location in the United States
- Coordinates: 38°20′36″N 120°30′44″W
- Country: United States
- State: California
- County: Calaveras

Area
  - Total: 9.220 sq mi (23.880 km^{2})
  - Land: 9.077 sq mi (23.509 km^{2})
  - Water: 0.143 sq mi (0.370 km^{2}) 1.55%
- Elevation: 2,608 ft (795 m)

Population (2020)
  - Total: 316
  - Density: 34.8/sq mi (13.4/km^{2})
- Time zone: UTC-8 (Pacific (PST))
  - Summer (DST): UTC-7 (PDT)
- ZIP code: 95248
- Area code: 209
- FIPS code: 06-59220
- GNIS feature IDs: 255013, 2409122

California Historical Landmark
- Reference no.: 286

Rail Road Flat (formerly Independence Flat and Railroad Flat) is a census-designated place (CDP) in Calaveras County, California, United States. The population was 316 at the 2020 census.

== History ==
This historic mining town, elevation 2,600 feet (788 m), was named after primitive mule-drawn ore cars used here. There was never actually a railroad here. The town was established in 1849. It was the site of an Indian council as well as the center of rich placer and quartz mining. Its largest producer was the Petticoat Mine. The post office was established in 1857, closed in 1858, and re-established in 1869 and the Edwin Taylor store built in 1867. The town's population was decimated in 1880 by black fever.

The Clark Reservoir was created when an engineer named W.V. Clark constructed a ditch from the Mokelumne River, as there was not much water to work the placers. The reservoir, located on his property, supplied water to the mines and to the town.

The town is registered as California Historical Landmark #286.

== Geography ==
According to the United States Census Bureau, the CDP has a total area of 9.2 square miles (24 km^{2}), of which 9.1 square miles (24 km^{2}) is land and 0.14 square miles (0.36 km^{2}) (1.55%) is water.

In 2010, the area of the CDP was 33.2 square miles (86 km^{2}), of which 33.0 square miles (85 km^{2}) was land and 0.2 square miles (0.52 km^{2}) (0.47%) was water.

== Demographics ==
Historical population
Census	Pop.	Note	%±
2000	549		—
2010	475		−13.5%
2020	316		−33.5%
U.S. Decennial Census; 1860–1870 1880-1890; 1900 1910 1920; 1930 1940 1950; 1960 1970 1980; 1990 2000 2010

Rail Road Flat first appeared as a census designated place in the 2000 U.S. census.

=== 2020 census ===
Rail Road Flat CDP, California – Racial and ethnic composition Note: the US Census treats Hispanic/Latino as an ethnic category. This table excludes Latinos from the racial categories and assigns them to a separate category. Hispanics/Latinos may be of any race.
Race / Ethnicity (NH = Non-Hispanic)	Pop 2000	Pop 2010	Pop 2020	% 2000	% 2010	% 2020
White alone (NH)	496	395	259	90.35%	83.16%	81.96%
Black or African American alone (NH)	1	0	1	0.18%	0.00%	0.32%
Native American or Alaska Native alone (NH)	5	13	4	0.91%	2.74%	1.27%
Asian alone (NH)	5	4	1	0.91%	0.84%	0.32%
Native Hawaiian or Pacific Islander alone (NH)	1	2	0	0.18%	0.42%	0.00%
Other race alone (NH)	1	0	4	0.18%	0.00%	1.27%
Mixed race or Multiracial (NH)	11	20	19	2.00%	4.21%	6.01%
Hispanic or Latino (any race)	29	41	28	5.28%	8.63%	8.86%
Total	549	475	316	100.00%	100.00%	100.00%

The 2020 United States census reported that Rail Road Flat had a population of 316. The population density was 34.8 inhabitants per square mile (13.4/km^{2}). The racial makeup of Rail Road Flat was 267 (84.5%) White, 1 (0.3%) African American, 4 (1.3%) Native American, 1 (0.3%) Asian, 0 (0.0%) Pacific Islander, 7 (2.2%) from other races, and 36 (11.4%) from two or more races. Hispanic or Latino of any race were 28 persons (8.9%).

The whole population lived in households. There were 146 households, out of which 27 (18.5%) had children under the age of 18 living in them, 71 (48.6%) were married-couple households, 11 (7.5%) were cohabiting couple households, 41 (28.1%) had a female householder with no partner present, and 23 (15.8%) had a male householder with no partner present. 33 households (22.6%) were one person, and 21 (14.4%) were one person aged 65 or older. The average household size was 2.16. There were 96 families (65.8% of all households).

The age distribution was 41 people (13.0%) under the age of 18, 16 people (5.1%) aged 18 to 24, 54 people (17.1%) aged 25 to 44, 97 people (30.7%) aged 45 to 64, and 108 people (34.2%) who were 65 years of age or older. The median age was 58.3 years. For every 100 females, there were 84.8 males.

There were 227 housing units at an average density of 25.0 units per square mile (9.7 units/km^{2}), of which 146 (64.3%) were occupied. Of these, 105 (71.9%) were owner-occupied, and 41 (28.1%) were occupied by renters.

=== 2010 ===
The 2010 United States census reported that Rail Road Flat had a population of 475. The population density was 14.3 people per square mile (5.5/km^{2}). The racial makeup of Rail Road Flat was 411 (86.5%) White, 0 (0.0%) African American, 15 (3.2%) Native American, 4 (0.8%) Asian, 2 (0.4%) Pacific Islander, 9 (1.9%) from other races, and 34 (7.2%) from two or more races. Hispanic or Latino of any race were 41 persons (8.6%).

The Census reported that 475 people (100% of the population) lived in households, 0 (0%) lived in non-institutionalized group quarters, and 0 (0%) were institutionalized.

There were 220 households, out of which 41 (18.6%) had children under the age of 18 living in them, 101 (45.9%) were opposite-sex married couples living together, 15 (6.8%) had a female householder with no spouse present, 7 (3.2%) had a male householder with no spouse present. There were 18 (8.2%) unmarried opposite-sex partnerships, and 0 (0%) same-sex married couples or partnerships. 72 households (32.7%) were made up of individuals, and 38 (17.3%) had someone living alone who was 65 years of age or older. The average household size was 2.16. There were 123 families (55.9% of all households); the average family size was 2.79.

The population was spread out, with 77 people (16.2%) under the age of 18, 20 people (4.2%) aged 18 to 24, 70 people (14.7%) aged 25 to 44, 186 people (39.2%) aged 45 to 64, and 122 people (25.7%) who were 65 years of age or older. The median age was 53.7 years. For every 100 females, there were 93.1 males. For every 100 females age 18 and over, there were 95.1 males.

There were 340 housing units at an average density of 10.3 per square mile (4.0/km^{2}), of which 220 were occupied, of which 169 (76.8%) were owner-occupied, and 51 (23.2%) were occupied by renters. The homeowner vacancy rate was 2.9%; the rental vacancy rate was 10.5%. 363 people (76.4% of the population) lived in owner-occupied housing units and 112 people (23.6%) lived in rental housing units.

=== 2000 ===
As of the census of 2000, the median income for a household in the CDP was $35,938, and the median income for a family was $35,278. Males had a median income of $32,083 versus $28,750 for females. The per capita income for the CDP was $18,454. About 6.7% of families and 18.4% of the population were below the poverty line, including 24.7% of those under age 18 and 6.0% of those age 65 or over.

== Politics ==
In the state legislature, Rail Road Flat is in the 4th senatorial district, represented by Republican Marie Alvarado-Gil, and the 8th Assembly district, represented by Republican David Tangipa. Federally, Rail Road Flat is in California's 5th congressional district, represented by Republican Tom McClintock.
