= Calaveras River =

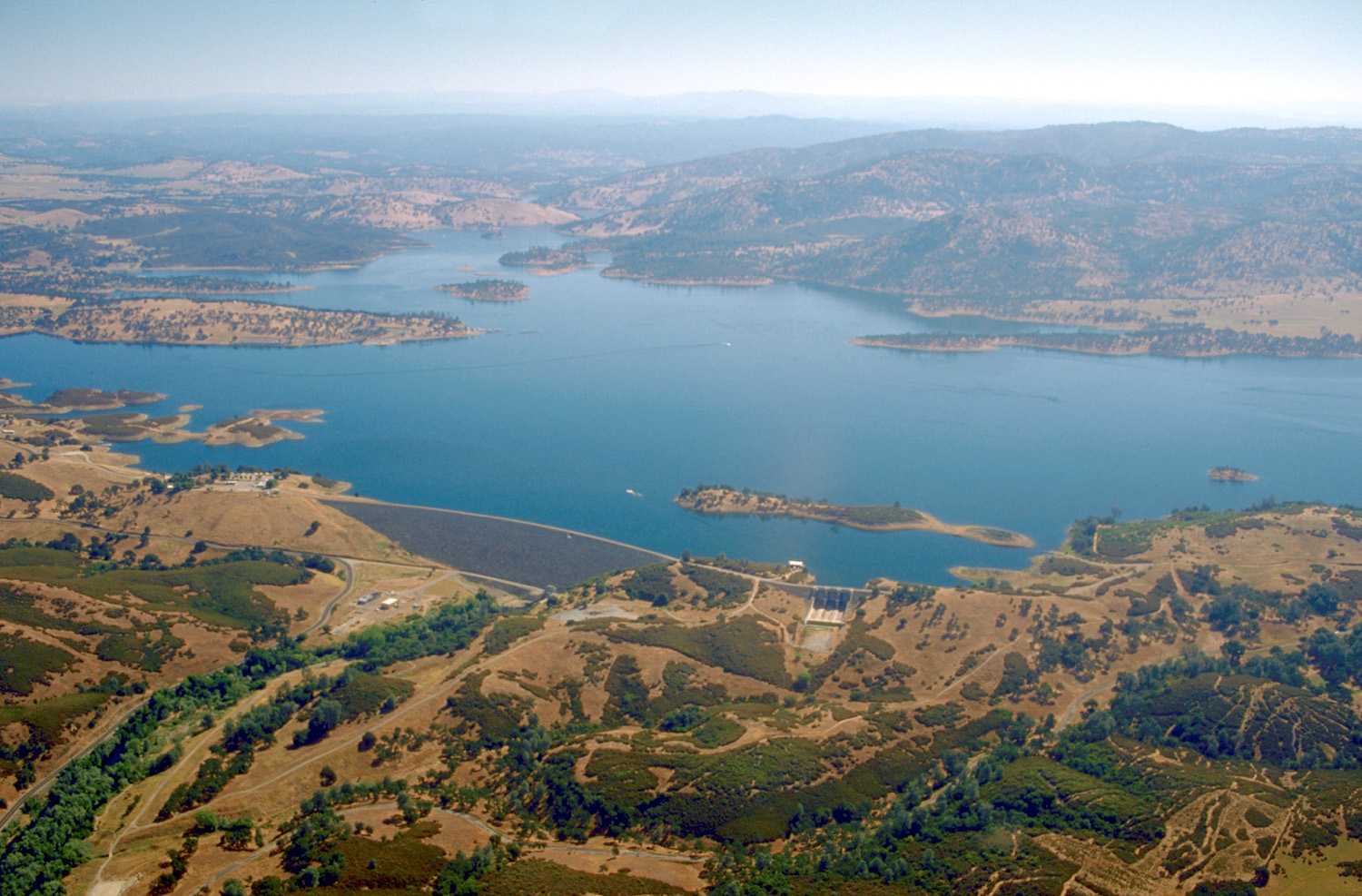
- New Hogan Lake, the main reservoir on the Calaveras River

Location
- Country: United States
- State: California

Physical characteristics
- Source: Confluence of North and South Forks
  - location: West of San Andreas
  - coordinates: 38°11′50″N 120°43′12″W
  - elevation: 705 ft (215 m)
- Mouth: San Joaquin River
  - location: Near Stockton
  - coordinates: 37°58′01″N 121°22′04″W
- Length: 51.9 mi (83.5 km)
- Basin size: 470 mi^{2} (1,200 km^{2})
- Discharge
  - location: Jenny Lind, CA
  - average: 225 cu ft/s (6.4 m^{3}/s)
  - minimum: 0 cu ft/s (0 m^{3}/s)
  - maximum: 50,000 cu ft/s (1,400 m^{3}/s)

The Calaveras River (Spanish: Río de las Calaveras) is a river in the San Joaquin Valley of California.

It flows roughly southwest for 51.9 miles (83.5 km) from the confluence of its north and south forks in Calaveras County to its confluence with the San Joaquin River in the city of Stockton.

In the past, it has been used for agriculture and irrigation, drinking water, and for recreational purposes. There have been many improvement projects on the Calaveras River to address its pollution and efficiency for local residents.

The Calaveras River has various species of fish that people catch, eat, and even some that are federally protected such as steelhead and rainbow trout.

== Background information ==
The Spanish word calaveras means "skulls." The river was said to have been named by Spanish explorer Gabriel Moraga in 1806 when he found many skulls of Native Americans along its banks. He believed they had either died of famine or been killed in tribal conflicts over hunting and fishing grounds.

In 1836, John Marsh, Jose Noriega, and a party of men, went exploring in Northern California. They made camp along a river bed in the evening, and when they woke up the next morning, discovered that they had camped in the midst of a great quantity of skulls and bones. They also gave the river the appropriate name: Calaveras.

== Watercourse ==
The North Fork Calaveras River and South Fork Calaveras River unite to form the mainstem Calaveras River just above New Hogan Lake. This reservoir is the only lake on the river. It is formed by New Hogan Dam, which was completed in 1963. The dam was built by the United States Army Corps of Engineers, primarily for flood control. The dam also provides hydroelectricity, and the reservoir provides drinking water, water for irrigation, and recreation, including fishing, camping, swimming and water skiing.

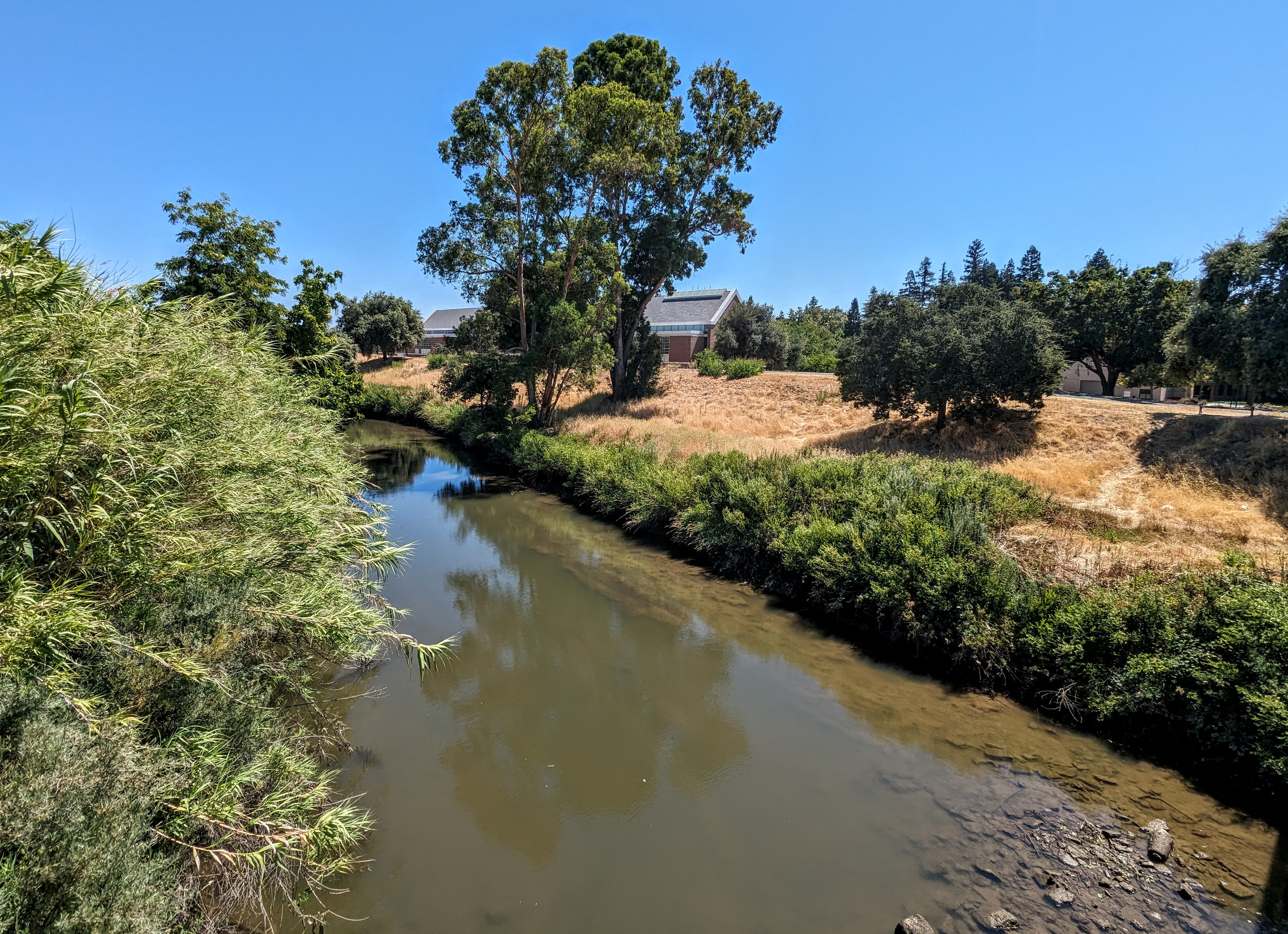
View of the Calaveras River, looking upstream from the Baxter Way bridge at the University of the Pacific, in Stockton, California. The building is the Don and Karen DeRosa University Center.

The Mormon Slough, a distributary of the Calaveras, splits away about five miles east of Linden, California. In east Stockton, the Stockton Diverting Canal reconnects the Mormon Slough and the Calaveras. Downstream from this flood control channel, the often dry Mormon Slough continues on its southerly path, through downtown, to the Stockton Channel. The Calaveras makes a northerly arc, passing through farmland, orchards, and the University of the Pacific Stockton Campus, then alongside its namesake Brookside district, before joining the San Joaquin River by flowing into the Deepwater Channel about three miles downriver from the Mormon Slough. Thus much of central Stockton, being completely surrounded by these waterways, is itself one of the many river islands which make up the San Joaquin Delta.

== Contaminants ==
=== Chemicals ===
Since the California Gold Rush of the Mid-1800s, water running through the state has been introduced to mercury and other industrial chemicals.

Per-and Polyfluoroakyl substances (PFAs) are a class of man-made chemicals designed to make products stain and water resistant, but are of concern to the environment. They are known as "forever chemicals" because they do not degrade well naturally and can stay in the soil, air, and water for a very long time.

As the Calaveras River is used for agriculture and surrounded by farmland, use of pesticides and herbicides also impact cleanliness of the water. As of 2021, diazinon and chlorpyrifos are present in levels toxic to water life in the San Joaquin river basin. Organophosphate pesticides are brought to the water by seasonal stormwater runoff. Farmers in California overall have started to reduce the use of pesticides, but it's not clear that this trend is reelected in the Calaveras watershed. Pesticide usage and runoff can change with a variety of factors, including rainfall and how much acreage is under cultivation.

Sources of hazardous material spills include maintenance issues such as sewers overflowing as well as fuel spills from boats and vehicles.

=== Algae Blooms ===
Cyanobacteria (blue green algae) common around the world, can be harmful when they form large colonies (called blooms). Algal blooms can produce toxins at levels harmful to humans and aquatic life, and extreme blooms can block sunlight and oxygen from reaching deeper water, further harming aquatic life. Algal blooms are rare in flowing rivers such as the Calaveras, but an algal bloom was first found in the watercourse in April 2019 in New Hogan Lake. It dissipated by June 2019.

== Past improvement plans ==
In 2014, the Calaveras River was struggling to house natural wildlife because of its past diversions that spread the river water too thin. The U.S. Fish and Wildlife Service worked with residents to restore bridges and rebuild structures that would serve to connect residents on both sides of the river while not inhibiting the natural migration of fish species, the Caprini Crossing for example. After these restorations, the river was able to produce more salmon and steelhead, considerable amounts for the relatively small system that is the Calaveras River.

=== 2020 Calaveras River Conservation Plan ===
In 2020, the Stockton East Water District planned out a program that would protect the threatened Central Valley steelhead, endangered Chinook salmon, and more natural wildlife. They called this the 2020 Calaveras River Conservation Plan. It was the first habitat conservation plan in the Central Valley to be approved by the National Marine Fisheries Service. The program helped federally protected species and helped to maintain water quality of the Calaveras River.
