= Mountain Ranch, California =

Mountain Ranch
- Unincorporated Community; Census Designated Place
- Location in Calaveras County and the state of California

- Location in the United States
- Coordinates: 38°13′42″N 120°32′27″W
- Country: United States
- State: California
- County: Calaveras

Area
  - Total: 3.91 sq mi (10.13 km^{2})
  - Land: 3.91 sq mi (10.13 km^{2})
  - Water: 0 sq mi (0 km^{2}) 0%
- Elevation: 2,123 ft (647 m)

Population (2020)
  - Total: 223
  - Density: 57/sq mi (22/km^{2})
- Time zone: UTC-8 (Pacific (PST))
  - Summer (DST): UTC-7 (PDT)
- ZIP code: 95246
- Area code: 209
- FIPS code: 06-49628
- GNIS feature IDs: 229196, 2408882

California Historical Landmark
- Official name: El Dorado
- Reference no.: 282

Mountain Ranch (formerly, El Dorado and El Dorado Town) is a census-designated place (CDP) in Calaveras County, California, United States. The population was 223 at the 2020 census. The town is registered as California Historical Landmark #282. The town center is quite small with fewer than 50 people living in it. The 5 mile square area surrounding the town accounts for the balance of the population.

== History ==
The settlement was established during the California Gold Rush. Mountain Ranch's post office was established in 1858. In 1868, it was moved to another town called El Dorado Camp 1.5 miles south, as there was already an El Dorado post office in California, El Dorado Camp became known as Mountain Ranch. Currently, there are 3 post office buildings in the town. The present one, a small post office which was built in 1956, and a post office built in 1923 which was once billed as the world's smallest post office. The original location of the town of Mountain Ranch also has a historical landmark. The bell on the historical marker was used in the local school from 1885 to 1953. Established as Cave City School District in 1855, this school joined with the Banner District in 1946 to become the El Dorado Union Elementary School District. In 1942 the last of the gold mines closed. Further economic losses took place in the 1970s, when local saw mills shuttered, and also in 1983 when the Calaveras Cement Co. closed. In 2015, the town was ravaged by the Butte Fire. More than 350 homes along the outskirts burned, but firefighters and local ranchers were able to save most of the downtown.

== Geography ==
According to the United States Census Bureau, the CDP has a total area of 3.9 square miles (10 km^{2}), all land.

At the 2010 census, the CDP was much larger, having a total area of 41.2 square miles (107 km^{2}), of which 99.86% was land, and 0.14% was water.

== Demographics ==
Historical population
Census	Pop.	Note	%±
2000	1,557		—
2010	1,628		4.6%
2020	223		−86.3%
U.S. Decennial Census; 1860–1870 1880-1890; 1900 1910 1920; 1930 1940 1950; 1960 1970 1980; 1990 2000 2010

Mountain Ranch first appeared as a census designated place in the 2000 U.S. census.

=== 2020 census ===
Mountain Ranch CDP, California – Racial and ethnic composition Note: the US Census treats Hispanic/Latino as an ethnic category. This table excludes Latinos from the racial categories and assigns them to a separate category. Hispanics/Latinos may be of any race.
Race / Ethnicity (NH = Non-Hispanic)	Pop 2000	Pop 2010	Pop 2020	% 2000	% 2010	% 2020
White alone (NH)	1,362	1,397	178	87.48%	85.81%	79.82%
Black or African American alone (NH)	22	15	0	1.41%	0.92%	0.00%
Native American or Alaska Native alone (NH)	19	19	2	1.22%	1.17%	0.90%
Asian alone (NH)	13	17	6	0.83%	1.04%	2.69%
Native Hawaiian or Pacific Islander alone (NH)	0	0	0	0.00%	0.00%	0.00%
Other race alone (NH)	1	0	4	0.06%	0.00%	1.79%
Mixed race or Multiracial (NH)	61	57	8	3.92%	3.50%	3.59%
Hispanic or Latino (any race)	79	123	25	5.07%	7.56%	11.21%
Total	1,557	1,628	223	100.00%	100.00%	100.00%

The 2020 United States census reported that Mountain Ranch had a population of 223. The population density was 57.0 inhabitants per square mile (22.0/km^{2}). The racial makeup of Mountain Ranch was 184 (82.5%) White, 0 (0.0%) African American, 2 (0.9%) Native American, 6 (2.7%) Asian, 0 (0.0%) Pacific Islander, 9 (4.0%) from other races, and 22 (9.9%) from two or more races. Hispanic or Latino of any race were 25 persons (11.2%).

The whole population lived in households. There were 106 households, out of which 25 (23.6%) had children under the age of 18 living in them, 43 (40.6%) were married-couple households, 12 (11.3%) were cohabiting couple households, 25 (23.6%) had a female householder with no partner present, and 26 (24.5%) had a male householder with no partner present. 35 households (33.0%) were one person, and 19 (17.9%) were one person aged 65 or older. The average household size was 2.1. There were 61 families (57.5% of all households).

The age distribution was 27 people (12.1%) under the age of 18, 3 people (1.3%) aged 18 to 24, 46 people (20.6%) aged 25 to 44, 51 people (22.9%) aged 45 to 64, and 96 people (43.0%) who were 65 years of age or older. The median age was 59.9 years. For every 100 females, there were 84.3 males.

There were 145 housing units at an average density of 37.1 units per square mile (14.3 units/km^{2}), of which 106 (73.1%) were occupied. Of these, 81 (76.4%) were owner-occupied, and 25 (23.6%) were occupied by renters.

=== 2010 ===
At the 2010 census Mountain Ranch had a population of 1,628. The population density was 39.5 inhabitants per square mile (15.3/km^{2}). The racial makeup of Mountain Ranch was 1,472 (90.4%) White, 15 (0.9%) African American, 33 (2.0%) Native American, 18 (1.1%) Asian, 2 (0.1%) Pacific Islander, 15 (0.9%) from other races, and 73 (4.5%) from two or more races. Hispanic or Latino of any race were 123 people (7.6%).

The whole population lived in households, no one lived in non-institutionalized group quarters and no one was institutionalized.

There were 748 households, 113 (15.1%) had children under the age of 18 living in them, 410 (54.8%) were opposite-sex married couples living together, 53 (7.1%) had a female householder with no husband present, 23 (3.1%) had a male householder with no wife present. There were 50 (6.7%) unmarried opposite-sex partnerships, and 5 (0.7%) same-sex married couples or partnerships. 211 households (28.2%) were one person and 89 (11.9%) had someone living alone who was 65 or older. The average household size was 2.18. There were 486 families (65.0% of households); the average family size was 2.60.

The age distribution was 213 people (13.1%) under the age of 18, 86 people (5.3%) aged 18 to 24, 201 people (12.3%) aged 25 to 44, 712 people (43.7%) aged 45 to 64, and 416 people (25.6%) who were 65 or older. The median age was 55.3 years. For every 100 females, there were 105.8 males. For every 100 females age 18 and over, there were 106.3 males.

There were 960 housing units at an average density of 23.3 per square mile (9.0/km^{2}), of which 748 were occupied, 620 (82.9%) by the owners and 128 (17.1%) by renters. The homeowner vacancy rate was 2.8%; the rental vacancy rate was 9.8%. 1,352 people (83.0% of the population) lived in owner-occupied housing units and 276 people (17.0%) lived in rental housing units.

== Politics ==
In the state legislature, Mountain Ranch is in the 4th senatorial district, represented by Republican Marie Alvarado-Gil, and the 8th Assembly district, represented by Republican David Tangipa. Federally, Mountain Ranch is in California's 5th congressional district, represented by Republican Tom McClintock.

== Notable person ==
- Jake Shields
