= Valley Springs, California =

Valley Springs
- Unincorporated Community; Census Designated Place
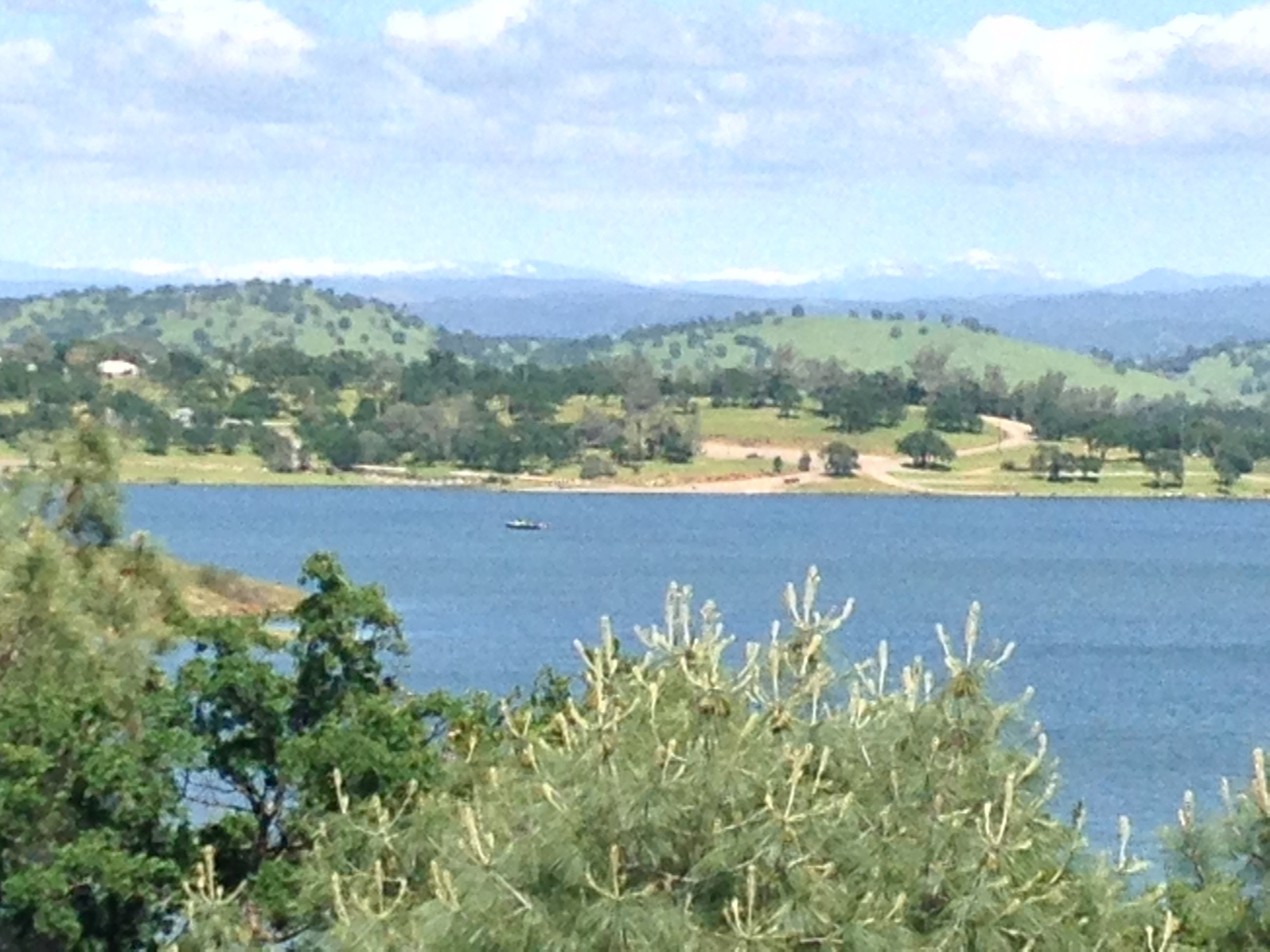
- New Hogan Lake, Valley Springs

- Location in Calaveras County and the state of California

- Location in the United States
- Coordinates: 38°11′30″N 120°49′45″W
- Country: United States
- State: California
- County: Calaveras

Area
  - Total: 3.994 sq mi (10.344 km^{2})
  - Land: 3.994 sq mi (10.344 km^{2})
  - Water: 0 sq mi (0 km^{2}) 0%
- Elevation: 669 ft (204 m)

Population (2020)
  - Total: 3,779
  - Density: 946.2/sq mi (365.3/km^{2})
- Time zone: UTC-8 (Pacific)
  - Summer (DST): UTC-7 (PDT)
- ZIP codes: 95226, 95252
- Area code: 209
- FIPS code: 06-81890
- GNIS feature IDs: 1660090, 2409398
- Website: Official website

California Historical Landmark
- Reference no.: 251

Valley Springs (formerly known as Spring Valley and Valley Spring) is a census-designated place (CDP) in Calaveras County, California, United States, in the foothills of the Sierra Nevada mountain range. Valley Springs is registered as a California Historical Landmark, number 251.

As of the 2020 census, Valley Springs had a population of 3,779.

== History ==
=== Early Native American inhabitants ===
The earliest inhabitants of Valley Springs were Native Americans, specifically the Mi-Wuk and Yokuts tribes. Evidence of their presence includes grinding rocks found in the area. These tribes gathered acorns for trade and food before returning to their homes in the spring. The Mi-Wuk were later driven further into the hills due to the influx of gold miners.

=== Settler construction ===
In 1849, the first saloon and store opened in the Valley Springs region. This development was followed by the establishment of small farms and large ranches to provide food for settlers. Stage stops emerged along what is now Highway 26, and lodging developed. Additionally, what is now Highway 12 linked roads to the surrounding areas.

=== Arrival of the railroads ===
The need for more affordable freight rates, expansion of tourism to Big Trees, and timber interests led to the construction of a quicker mode of transport. Land sold quickly, and roads and buildings were constructed as settlers arrived.

The San Joaquin & Sierra Nevada Railroad built a three-foot narrow gauge line from Brack's Landing on the Mokelumne River to Valley Springs, completed in April 1885 at a cost of $409,570. On April 25, 1885, the first train arrived at Valley Springs station, initially just a tent. Valley Springs became a center of freight distribution, with residents able to reach San Francisco in 7.5 hours, Stockton in 2.5 hours, and Sacramento in 3 hours by train.

=== Development and challenges ===
In September 1895, a large fire destroyed much of the central town. Despite rebuilding efforts, Valley Springs’ population growth remained below 1% per year. Electricity was installed in 1899. Around 1904, Southern Pacific converted the rail line to standard gauge. However, from 1910 to 1930, the population drastically decreased, and by 1923, Valley Springs had only 350 residents.

=== Industrial expansion ===
In 1925, Southern Pacific extended the rail line 13 miles east to Kentucky House to serve the Calaveras Cement Company. This extension facilitated the development of the Pardee Dam and the shipment of cement to customers such as the Bay Area. Major projects like the McClellan and Travis Air Force bases, San Francisco Airport, Central Valley dams, and the San Francisco-Oakland Bay Bridge were built using cement transported from Valley Springs. The construction of the Hogan Dam and Pardee Dam increased employment. Local industries, including lumber, forest products, cement, and clay, boosted shipping needs. Agriculture remained the primary occupation, focusing on grains, livestock, and small-scale wine grapes and olives. Valley Springs’ strategic location was key to its importance. The 1930s and 1940s saw a 6% annual population increase. Population growth flattened in the 1950s but surged again in the 1960s due to the development of the Camanche Reservoir and the expansion of the Hogan Reservoir.

=== Decline of rail service ===
Passenger service ended around 1932, but the rail line continued to operate as a freight line until the cement plant closed, with the last shipment in 1983.

=== Economic and population changes ===
The 1970s experienced further population increases from developments like Rancho Calaveras and the La Contenta Golf Course. Despite the closure of major manufacturing in the 1980s, Valley Springs continues to grow in population and development, contributing to the development of major cities in the valley and the bay.

=== Postal services ===
A post office was opened in Valley Springs in 1872, closed in 1879, and re-established in 1882. A post office currently operates in the town.

== Geography ==
According to the United States Census Bureau, the CDP has a total area of 4.0 square miles (10 km^{2}), all land.

== Climate ==
Valley Springs has a Mediterranean climate typical of the Sierra Nevada foothills. Winters are cool and wet with mild days, chilly nights, and substantial rainfall. Summers are hot and dry with very hot days, cool nights, and minimal rainfall. Due to the orographic effect, rainfall in all seasons is significantly greater than on the valley floor to the west.

Climate data for United States
Month	Jan	Feb	Mar	Apr	May	Jun	Jul	Aug	Sep	Oct	Nov	Dec	Year
Mean daily maximum °F (°C)	53 (12)	59 (15)	63 (17)	69 (21)	79 (26)	88 (31)	94 (34)	93 (34)	88 (31)	77 (25)	62 (17)	53 (12)	73.2 (22.9)
Daily mean °F (°C)	46.0 (7.8)	50.5 (10.3)	53.5 (11.9)	58.0 (14.4)	65.5 (18.6)	72.5 (22.5)	76.9 (24.9)	78.0 (25.6)	73.5 (23.1)	65.0 (18.3)	53.5 (11.9)	46.0 (7.8)	61.6 (16.4)
Mean daily minimum °F (°C)	39 (4)	42 (6)	44 (7)	47 (8)	52 (11)	57 (14)	62 (17)	62 (17)	59 (15)	53 (12)	45 (7)	39 (4)	50.1 (10.1)
Average precipitation inches (mm)	4.13 (105)	3.86 (98)	3.82 (97)	2.01 (51)	1.18 (30)	0.28 (7.1)	0 (0)	0.04 (1.0)	0.43 (11)	1.3 (33)	2.68 (68)	3.74 (95)	23.47 (596)

Summers are typically very warm to hot, springs and falls are temperate, and winters are cool with a slight dusting of snow and/or frost. Hot, dry summers make Valley Springs fire-prone; however, three fire stations, lake water, and adequate road access assist in extinguishing fires expediently.

== Demographics ==
Historical population
Census	Pop.	Note	%±
2000	2,560		—
2010	3,553		38.8%
2020	3,779		6.4%
U.S. Decennial Census; 1860–1870 1880-1890; 1900 1910 1920; 1930 1940 1950; 1960 1970 1980; 1990 2000 2010

Valley Springs first appeared as a census designated place in the 2000 U.S. census.

=== Racial and ethnic composition ===
Valley Springs CDP, California – Racial and ethnic composition Note: the US Census treats Hispanic/Latino as an ethnic category. This table excludes Latinos from the racial categories and assigns them to a separate category. Hispanics/Latinos may be of any race.
Race / Ethnicity (NH = Non-Hispanic)	Pop 2000	Pop 2010	Pop 2020	% 2000	% 2010	% 2020
White alone (NH)	2,124	2,850	2,649	82.97%	80.21%	70.10%
Black or African American alone (NH)	17	30	36	0.66%	0.84%	0.95%
Native American or Alaska Native alone (NH)	34	25	24	1.33%	0.70%	0.64%
Asian alone (NH)	35	68	114	1.37%	1.91%	3.02%
Native Hawaiian or Pacific Islander alone (NH)	3	5	3	0.12%	0.14%	0.08%
Other race alone (NH)	3	9	19	0.12%	0.25%	0.50%
Mixed race or Multiracial (NH)	69	112	244	2.70%	3.15%	6.46%
Hispanic or Latino (any race)	275	454	690	10.74%	12.78%	18.26%
Total	2,560	3,553	3,779	100.00%	100.00%	100.00%

=== 2020 census ===
As of the 2020 census, Valley Springs had a population of 3,779. The median age was 44.5 years. 21.5% of residents were under the age of 18 and 22.0% of residents were 65 years of age or older. For every 100 females there were 98.1 males, and for every 100 females age 18 and over there were 94.6 males age 18 and over.

96.6% of residents lived in urban areas, while 3.4% lived in rural areas.

There were 1,429 households in Valley Springs, of which 27.0% had children under the age of 18 living in them. Of all households, 54.2% were married-couple households, 14.8% were households with a male householder and no spouse or partner present, and 22.3% were households with a female householder and no spouse or partner present. About 20.8% of all households were made up of individuals and 11.3% had someone living alone who was 65 years of age or older.

There were 1,535 housing units, of which 6.9% were vacant. The homeowner vacancy rate was 2.7% and the rental vacancy rate was 7.5%.

=== 2010 census ===
Valley Springs' total population is 3,553, at 50.00% each male and female (with 1 more male than female).

== Politics ==
Valley Springs voters are a majority Republican, about one-third Democrat, and roughly 9% independent. This is a greater percentage Republican and Independent than the United States average, and a lesser percentage Democrat.

In the state legislature, Valley Springs is in the 4th senatorial district, represented by Republican Marie Alvarado-Gil, and the 8th Assembly district, represented by Republican David Tangipa.

Federally, Valley Springs is in California's 5th congressional district, represented by Republican Tom McClintock.

== See also ==
- Double Springs, California
