= Calaveras County, California =

County in California, United States

Coordinates: 38.21°N 120.55°W

Calaveras County
- County
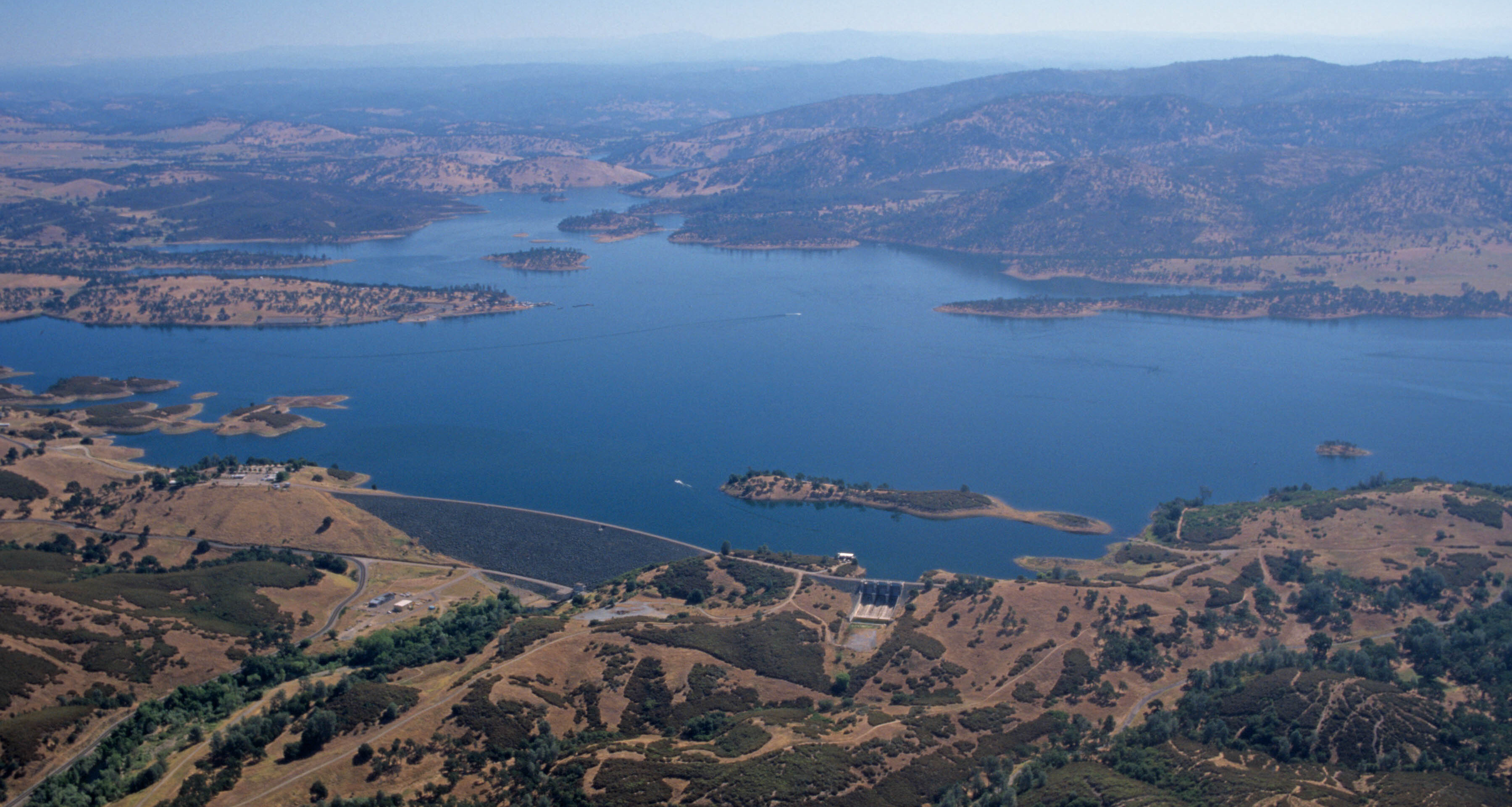
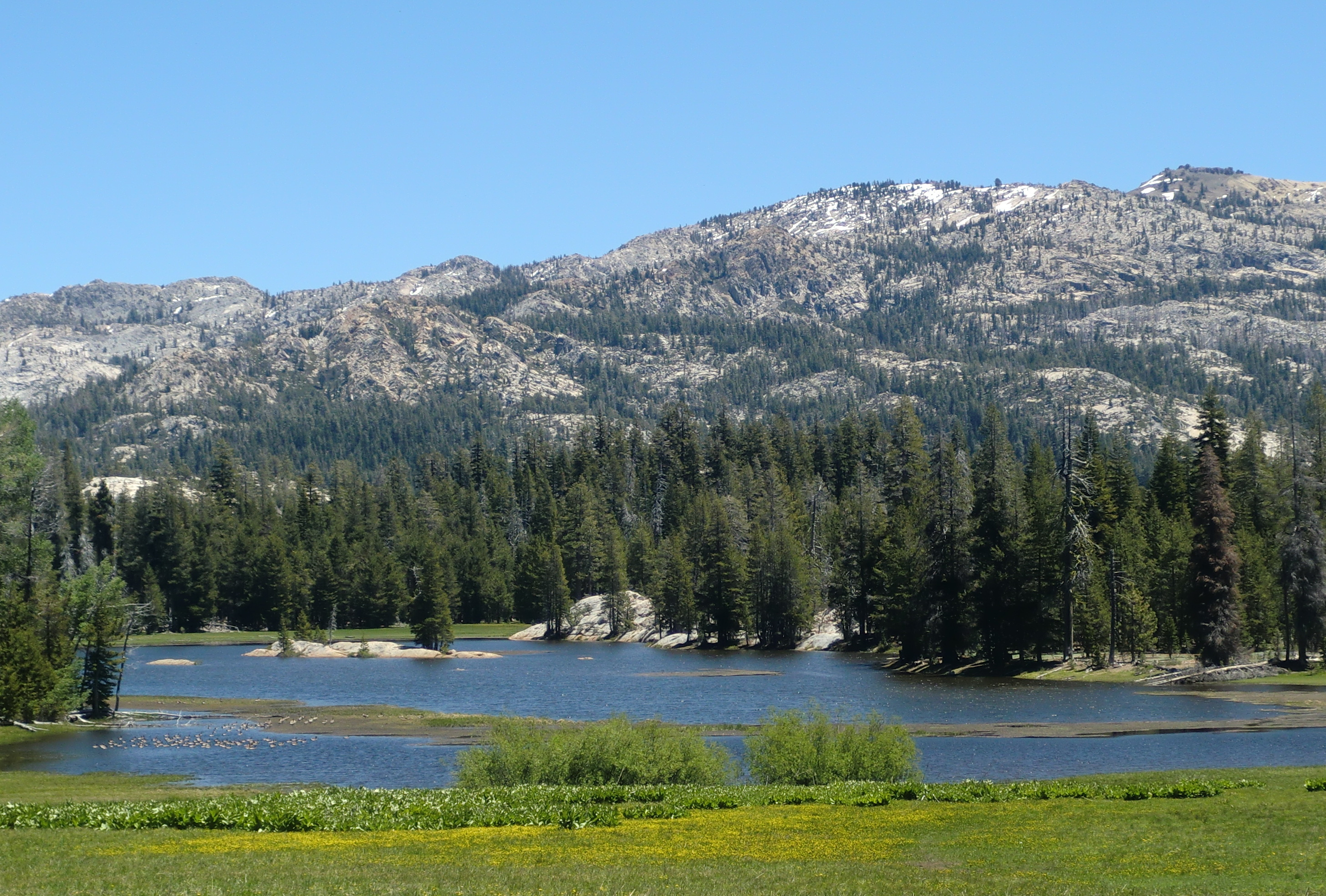
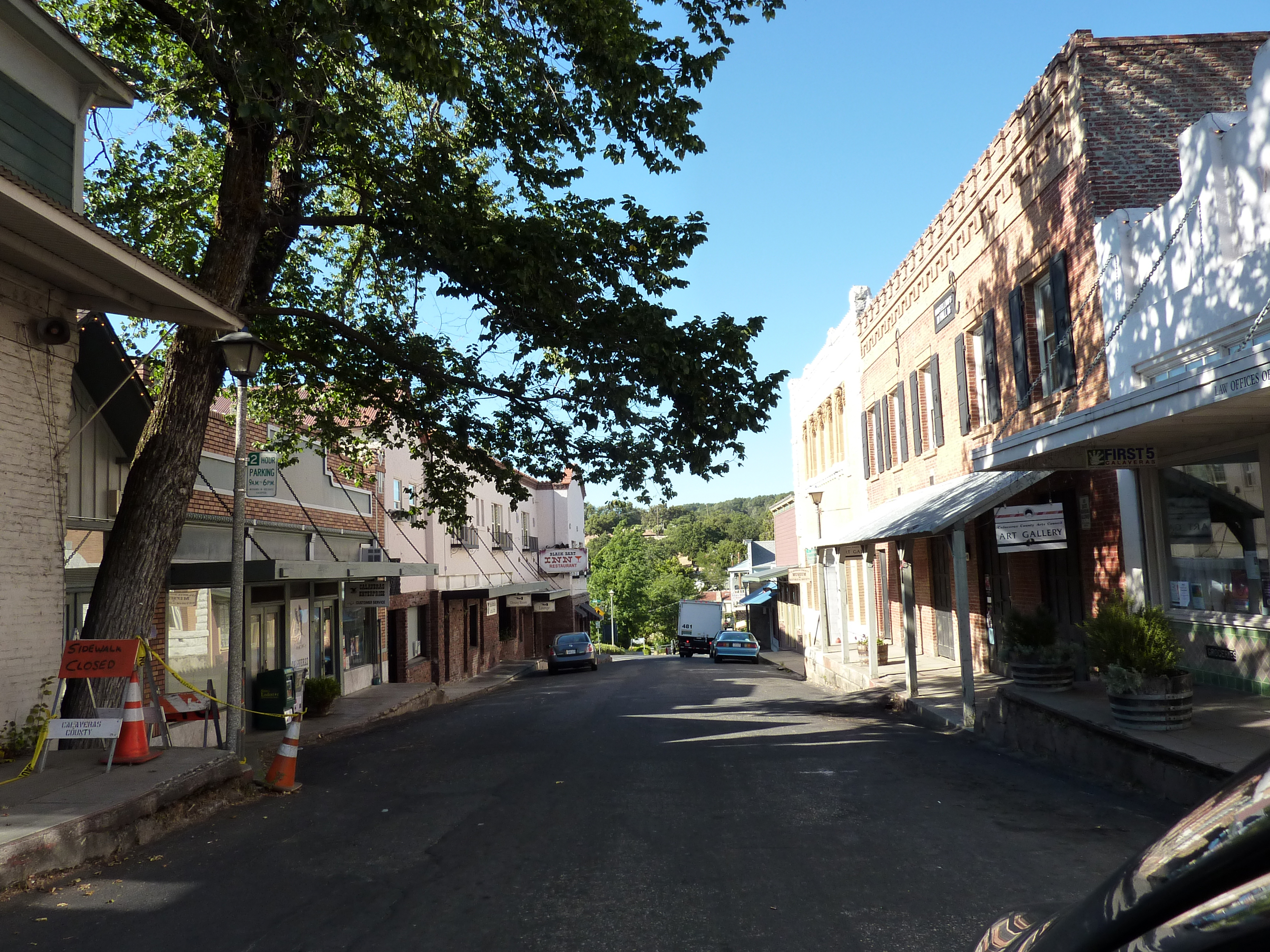
- New Hogan Lake and New Hogan Dam Calaveras Big Trees Angel's Camp San Andreas Fourth Crossing

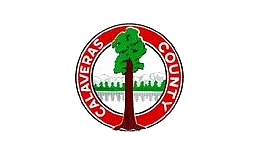
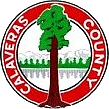
- Flag Seal
- Interactive map of Calaveras County
- Country: United States
- State: California
- Regions: Sierra Nevada, Gold Country
- Incorporated: February 18, 1850
- Named for: Spanish word meaning "skulls"
- County seat: San Andreas
- Largest community: Rancho Calaveras (population); Mountain Ranch (area)

Government
  - Type: Council–CAO
  - Body: Board of Supervisors
  - Chair: Martin Huberty
  - Vice Chair: Benjamin Stopper
  - Board of Supervisors: Supervisors: Gary Tofanelli; Autumn Andahl; Martin Huberty; Amanda Folendorf; Benjamin Stopper
  - County Administrative Officer: Crista Voh Latta

Area
  - Total: 1,037 sq mi (2,690 km^{2})
  - Land: 1,020 sq mi (2,600 km^{2})
  - Water: 17 sq mi (44 km^{2})
- Highest elevation: 8,174 ft (2,491 m)

Population (2020)
  - Total: 45,292
  - Estimate (2025): 46,605 ▲
  - Density: 44.4/sq mi (17.1/km^{2})

GDP
  - Total: $1.642 billion (2022)
- Time zone: UTC−08:00 (Pacific Time Zone)
  - Summer (DST): UTC−07:00 (Pacific Daylight Time)
- Area code: 209
- FIPS code: 06-009
- GNIS feature ID: 1675885
- Congressional district: 5th
- Website: calaverasgov.us

Calaveras County (Calaveras, Spanish for "Skulls"; /ˌkæləˈvɛrəs/), officially the County of Calaveras, is a county in both the Gold Country and High Sierra regions of the U.S. state of California. As of the 2020 census, the population was 45,292. The county seat is San Andreas. Angels Camp is the county's only incorporated city. The county was reportedly named for the remains of Native Americans discovered by the Spanish explorer Captain Gabriel Moraga in 1806.

Calaveras Big Trees State Park, a preserve of giant sequoia trees, is in the county several miles east of the town of Arnold on State Highway 4. Credit for the discovery of giant sequoias there is given to Augustus T. Dowd, a trapper who made the discovery in 1852 while tracking a bear. When the bark from the "Discovery Tree" was removed and taken on tour around the world, the trees became a worldwide sensation and one of the county's first tourist attractions. The uncommon gold telluride mineral calaverite was discovered in the county in 1861 and is named for it.

Mark Twain set his story "The Celebrated Jumping Frog of Calaveras County" in the county. The county hosts an annual fair and Jumping Frog Jubilee, featuring a frog-jumping contest, to celebrate the association with Twain's story. Each year's winner is commemorated with a brass plaque mounted in the sidewalk of downtown Historic Angels Camp and this feature is known as the Frog Hop of Fame. Lukas Foss used Twain's story for his 1950 opera The Jumping Frog of Calaveras County.

In 2015, Calaveras County had the highest rate of suicide deaths in the United States, with 49.1 per 100,000 people.

== Etymology ==
The Spanish word calaveras means "skulls." The county takes its name from the Calaveras River; it was said to have been named by Spanish explorer Gabriel Moraga, during his 1806–1808 expeditions, when he found many skulls of Native Americans along the banks of the stream. He believed they had either died of famine or been killed in tribal conflicts over hunting and fishing grounds. A more likely cause was a European epidemic disease, acquired from interacting with other tribes near the Missions on the coast. The Stanislaus River, which forms the southern boundary, is named for Estanislao, a Lakisamni Yokuts who escaped from Mission San José in the late 1830s. He is reported to have raised a small group of men with crude weapons, hiding in the foothills when the Mexicans attacked. The natives were quickly decimated by Mexican firearms.

In 1836, John Marsh, Jose Noriega, and a party of men went exploring in Northern California. They made camp along a river bed in the evening, and upon waking discovered that they had camped amid a great quantity of skulls and bones. They also gave the river the name Calaveras.

Mark Twain spent 88 days in the county in 1865, during which he heard the story that became "The Celebrated Jumping Frog of Calaveras County" at the Angel Hotel. This story kicked off his career and put Calaveras County on the map.

== History ==
Calaveras County was one of the original counties of the state of California, created in 1850 at the time of admission to the Union. Parts of the county's territory were reassigned to Amador County in 1854 and to Alpine County in 1864.

The county's geography includes landmarks, rolling hills, and giant valleys. It is also known for its friendly communities, and businesses such as agriculture management and construction engineering. It has numerous caverns, such as Mercer Caverns, California Cavern and Moaning Cavern that are national destinations for tourists from across the country. Other attractions include a thriving wine making industry, including the largest of the Calaveras wineries: Ironstone Vineyards, mountain sports recreation and the performing arts.

Gold prospecting in Calaveras County began in late 1848 with a camp founded by Henry Angel. Angel may have first arrived in California as a soldier, serving under Colonel Frémont during the Mexican War. After the war's end, he found himself in Monterey where he heard of the fabulous finds in the gold fields. He joined the Carson-Robinson party of prospectors and set out for the mines. The company parted ways upon reaching what later became known as Angels Creek. Henry Angel tried placer mining but soon opened a trading post. By the end of the year, over one hundred tents were scattered about the creek and the settlement was referred to as Angels Trading Post, later shortened to Angels Camp.

Placer mining soon gave out around the camp, but an extensive gold-bearing quartz vein of the area's Mother Lode was located by the Winter brothers during the mid-1850s, and this brought in the foundations of a permanent town. This vein followed Main Street from Angels Creek up to the southern edge of Altaville. Five major mines worked the rich vein: the Stickle, the Utica, the Lightner, the Angels, and the Sultana. These mines reached their peaks during the 1880s and 1890s, when over 200 stamp mills crushed quartz ore brought in by hand cars on track from the mines. By the time hard rock mining was done, the five mines had produced a total of over $20 million in gold.

In December 1849 and January 1850 the county was the site of "Chile War of 1849" in which Anglo-American and Chilean miners raided each others camp and fought a legal battle. The conflict ended with three Chileans publicly executed in Mokelumne Hill on January 3, 1850.

The telluride mineral calaverite was first recognized and obtained in 1861 from the Stanislaus Mine, Carson Hill, Angels Camp, in Calaveras Co., California. It was named for the County of origin by chemist and mineralogist Frederick Augustus Genth who differentiated it from the known gold telluride mineral sylvanite, and formally reported it as a new gold mineral in 1868.

== Geography ==
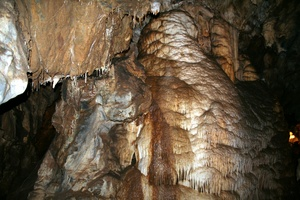
California Caverns – Calaveras County

According to the U.S. Census Bureau, the county has a total area of 1,037 square miles (2,690 km^{2}), of which 1,020 square miles (2,600 km^{2}) is land and 17 square miles (44 km^{2}) (1.6%) is water. A California Department of Forestry report lists the county's area in acres as 663,000, although the exact figure would be 663,477.949 acres (2,685.00000 km^{2}). There are a number of caverns located in Calaveras County.

=== Adjacent counties ===
- Amador County – north
- Alpine County – northeast
- Tuolumne County – south
- Stanislaus County – southwest
- San Joaquin County – west

=== National protected area ===
- Stanislaus National Forest (part)

== Demographics ==
Historical population
Census	Pop.	Note	%±
1850	16,884		—
1860	16,299		−3.5%
1870	8,895		−45.4%
1880	9,094		2.2%
1890	8,882		−2.3%
1900	11,200		26.1%
1910	9,171		−18.1%
1920	6,183		−32.6%
1930	6,008		−2.8%
1940	8,221		36.8%
1950	9,902		20.4%
1960	10,289		3.9%
1970	13,585		32.0%
1980	20,710		52.4%
1990	31,998		54.5%
2000	40,554		26.7%
2010	45,578		12.4%
2020	45,292		−0.6%
2025 (est.)	46,605	▲	2.9%
U.S. Decennial Census; 1790–1960 1900–1990; 1990–2000 2010 2020

=== 2020 census ===
As of the 2020 census, the county had a population of 45,292. The median age was 51.6 years. 17.6% of residents were under the age of 18 and 28.2% of residents were 65 years of age or older. For every 100 females there were 101.0 males, and for every 100 females age 18 and over there were 99.6 males age 18 and over.

The racial makeup of the county was 80.2% White, 0.8% Black or African American, 1.6% American Indian and Alaska Native, 1.6% Asian, 0.2% Native Hawaiian and Pacific Islander, 4.4% from some other race, and 11.1% from two or more races. Hispanic or Latino residents of any race comprised 12.9% of the population.

18.0% of residents lived in urban areas, while 82.0% lived in rural areas.

There were 18,758 households in the county, of which 23.1% had children under the age of 18 living with them and 22.1% had a female householder with no spouse or partner present. About 25.7% of all households were made up of individuals and 14.8% had someone living alone who was 65 years of age or older.

There were 27,422 housing units, of which 31.6% were vacant. Among occupied housing units, 79.0% were owner-occupied and 21.0% were renter-occupied. The homeowner vacancy rate was 2.8% and the rental vacancy rate was 6.5%.

=== Racial and ethnic composition ===
Calveras County, California – Racial and ethnic composition Note: the US Census treats Hispanic/Latino as an ethnic category. This table excludes Latinos from the racial categories and assigns them to a separate category. Hispanics/Latinos may be of any race.
Race / Ethnicity (NH = Non-Hispanic)	Pop 1980	Pop 1990	Pop 2000	Pop 2010	Pop 2020	% 1980	% 1990	% 2000	% 2010	% 2020
White alone (NH)	19,271	29,288	35,465	38,074	34,668	93.05%	91.53%	87.45%	83.54%	76.54%
Black or African American alone (NH)	72	180	300	355	334	0.35%	0.56%	0.74%	0.78%	0.74%
Native American or Alaska Native alone (NH)	319	606	607	526	497	1.54%	1.89%	1.50%	1.15%	1.10%
Asian alone (NH)	73	187	322	529	706	0.35%	0.58%	0.79%	1.16%	1.56%
Native Hawaiian or Pacific Islander alone (NH)	x	x	36	71	75	x	x	0.09%	0.16%	0.17%
Other race alone (NH)	64	23	40	68	268	0.31%	0.07%	0.10%	0.15%	0.59%
Mixed race or Multiracial (NH)	x	x	1,019	1,252	2,879	x	x	2.51%	2.75%	6.36%
Hispanic or Latino (any race)	911	1,714	2,765	4,703	5,865	4.40%	5.36%	6.82%	10.32%	12.95%
Total	20,710	31,998	40,554	45,578	45,292	100.00%	100.00%	100.00%	100.00%	100.00%

=== American Community Survey 2025 data ===
The United States Census Bureau estimated that in 2025, Calaveras County’s population was 46.605. It was also estimated that the county's population was 73,47% Non-Hispanic White, 16,84% Hispanic or Latino, 0,86% Non-Hispanic Black, 2,06% Asian, 1,16% Native American, 0,19% Pacific Islander, and 5,41% Multiracial.

Total	Population	Percentage
Non-Hispanic White	34.242	73,47%
Hispanic or Latino	7.848	16,84%
Non-Hispanic Black	403	0,86%
Asian	961	2,06%
Native American	542	1,16%
Pacific Islander	88	0,19%
Non-Hispanic Multiracial	2.521	5,41%

=== 2010 census ===
The 2010 United States census reported that Calaveras County had a population of 45,578. The racial makeup of Calaveras County was 40,522 (88.9%) White, 383 (0.8%) African American, 689 (1.5%) Native American, 571 (1.3%) Asian, 79 (0.2%) Pacific Islander, 1,534 (3.4%) from other races, and 1,800 (3.9%) from two or more races. Hispanic or Latino of any race were 4,703 persons (10.3%).

Population reported at 2010 United States census
The County	Total; Population	White	African; American	Native; American	Asian	Pacific; Islander	other races	two or more races	Hispanic or Latino (of any race)
Calaveras County	45,578	40,522	383	689	571	79	1,534	1,800	4,703
Incorporated city	Total; Population	White	African; American	Native; American	Asian	Pacific; Islander	other races	two or more races	Hispanic or Latino (of any race)
Angels Camp	3,836	3,329	12	48	49	5	270	123	498
Census-designated places	Total; Population	White	African; American	Native; American	Asian	Pacific; Islander	other races	two or more races	Hispanic or Latino (of any race)
Arnold	3,843	3,590	20	28	46	3	60	96	259
Avery	646	604	5	7	3	1	2	24	38
Copperopolis	3,671	3,318	31	43	36	12	83	148	454
Dorrington	609	576	0	2	11	1	1	18	33
Forest Meadows	1,249	1,198	0	4	14	0	7	26	60
Mokelumne Hill	646	571	3	12	4	0	26	30	66
Mountain Ranch	1,628	1,472	15	33	18	2	15	73	123
Murphys	2,213	2,045	9	17	7	10	82	43	223
Rail Road Flat	475	411	0	15	4	2	9	34	41
Rancho Calaveras	5,325	4,645	48	102	87	13	195	235	670
San Andreas	2,783	2,453	23	48	28	1	83	147	255
Vallecito	442	398	0	6	11	1	5	21	33
Valley Springs	3,553	3,047	35	39	70	6	179	177	454
Wallace	403	347	3	4	10	2	22	15	32
West Point	674	563	0	43	2	7	29	30	67
Other unincorporated areas	Total; Population	White	African; American	Native; American	Asian	Pacific; Islander	other races	two or more races	Hispanic or Latino (of any race)
All others not CDPs (combined)	13,582	11,955	179	238	171	13	466	560	1,397

=== 2000 census ===
As of the census of 2000, there were 40,554 people, 16,469 households, and 11,742 families residing in the county. The population density was 40 people per square mile (15 people/km^{2}). There were 22,946 housing units at an average density of 22 per square mile (8.5/km^{2}). The racial makeup of the county was 91.2% White, 0.8% Black or African American, 1.7% Native American, 0.9% Asian, 0.1% Pacific Islander, 2.1% from other races, and 3.3% from two or more races. 6.8% of the population were Hispanic or Latino of any race. 15.7% were of German, 13.0% English, 10.7% Irish, 7.4% Italian and 7.0% American ancestry according to Census 2000. 94.5% spoke English and 4.0% Spanish as their first language.

There were 16,469 households, out of which 26.7% had children under the age of 18 living with them, 58.9% were married couples living together, 8.6% had a female householder with no husband present, and 28.7% were non-families. 23.3% of all households were made up of individuals, and 10.1% had someone living alone who was 65 years of age or older. The average household size was 2.44 and the average family size was 2.85.

In the county, the population was spread out, with 22.8% under the age of 18, 5.5% from 18 to 24, 22.4% from 25 to 44, 31.1% from 45 to 64, and 18.2% who were 65 years of age or older. The median age was 45 years. For every 100 females there were 98.5 males. For every 100 females age 18 and over, there were 95.7 males.

The median income for a household in the county was $41,022, and the median income for a family was $47,379. Males had a median income of $41,827 versus $28,108 for females. The per capita income for the county was $21,420. About 8.7% of families and 11.80% of the population were below the poverty line, including 15.6% of those under age 18 and 6.2% of those age 65 or over.

== Economy ==
The major Calaveras County employers include:

250–499 employees:

- Calaveras County Government
- Forestry & Fire Protection
- Mark Twain St. Joseph's Hospital

100–249 employees:

- Bret Harte Union High School
- Ironstone Vineyards
- Calaveras High School
- Mark Twain Convalescent Hospital
- Mountain Machinery

== Government and policing ==
Calaveras County operates as a general law county under the California Constitution and law. It does not have a county charter.

The county is governed by a five-member Board of Supervisors. Members are elected to four-year terms by district under a nonpartisan primary.

As of 2025, the supervisors are:

- Gary Tofanelli, District 1
- Autumn Andahl, District 2
- Martin Huberty, District 3
- Amanda Folendorf, District 4
- Benjamin Stopper, District 5.

=== Elections and politics ===
==== Voter registration statistics ====
Population and registered voters
Total eligible population	36,563	
Registered voters (Note: Percentage of registered voters with respect to total population. Percentages of party members with respect to registered voters follow.)	32,172	87.9%
Democratic	8,529	23.3%
Republican	14,857	40.6%
Democratic–Republican spread	-6,328	-17.3%
American Independent	1,872	5.1%
Libertarian	610	1.6%
Green	159	0.4%
Peace and Freedom	129	0.3%
Unknown	120	0.3%
Other	304	0.8%
No party preference	5,592	15.2%

===== Cities by population and voter registration =====
Cities by population and voter registration
City	Population	Registered voters	Democratic	Republican	D–R spread	Other	No party preference
Angels	3,820	61.9%	31.5%	42.9%	-11.4%	11.2%	18.1%

==== Overview ====
United States presidential election results for Calaveras County, California
Year	Republican		Democratic		Third party(ies)	
Year	No.	%	No.	%	No.	%
1892	1,355	49.69%	1,276	46.79%	96	3.52%
1896	1,541	49.92%	1,518	49.17%	28	0.91%
1900	1,600	54.59%	1,288	43.94%	43	1.47%
1904	1,571	58.75%	844	31.56%	259	9.69%
1908	1,323	55.54%	833	34.97%	226	9.49%
1912	5	0.16%	1,869	60.51%	1,215	39.33%
1916	1,175	40.91%	1,524	53.06%	173	6.02%
1920	1,480	63.96%	641	27.70%	193	8.34%
1924	872	39.44%	333	15.06%	1,006	45.50%
1928	1,262	53.79%	1,066	45.44%	18	0.77%
1932	754	29.01%	1,744	67.10%	101	3.89%
1936	960	27.16%	2,520	71.31%	54	1.53%
1940	1,649	40.39%	2,405	58.90%	29	0.71%
1944	1,455	43.19%	1,893	56.19%	21	0.62%
1948	1,888	46.77%	1,995	49.42%	154	3.81%
1952	3,112	61.65%	1,890	37.44%	46	0.91%
1956	2,843	57.91%	2,049	41.74%	17	0.35%
1960	2,820	52.60%	2,509	46.80%	32	0.60%
1964	2,244	41.58%	3,145	58.27%	8	0.15%
1968	3,042	52.16%	2,134	36.59%	656	11.25%
1972	4,119	60.76%	2,268	33.46%	392	5.78%
1976	3,695	49.08%	3,607	47.91%	226	3.00%
1980	6,054	58.92%	3,076	29.94%	1,145	11.14%
1984	7,632	64.26%	4,081	34.36%	164	1.38%
1988	7,640	56.28%	5,674	41.80%	260	1.92%
1992	6,006	35.35%	5,989	35.25%	4,996	29.40%
1996	8,279	48.12%	6,646	38.63%	2,281	13.26%
2000	10,599	56.15%	7,093	37.58%	1,184	6.27%
2004	13,601	60.87%	8,286	37.09%	456	2.04%
2008	12,835	55.07%	9,813	42.11%	658	2.82%
2012	12,365	56.76%	8,670	39.80%	751	3.45%
2016	13,511	58.40%	7,944	34.34%	1,681	7.27%
2020	16,518	60.81%	10,046	36.98%	600	2.21%
2024	16,625	62.78%	9,181	34.67%	674	2.55%

Calaveras County is in California's 5th congressional district, represented by Republican Tom McClintock.

In the State Senate, Calaveras County is in the 4th senatorial district, represented by Republican Marie Alvarado-Gil. In the State Assembly, it is mostly in the 8th Assembly district, represented by Republican David Tangipa, and partly in the 9th Assembly district, represented by Republican Heath Flora.

Past presidential elections in Calaveras County have displayed preferences for Republican candidates; the last Democrat to win a majority in the county was Lyndon Johnson in 1964, although Democrat Bill Clinton lost the county by only 17 votes in 1992. In 2020, Republicans won 60% of the vote for the first time since 2004.

== Crime ==
The following table includes the number of incidents reported and the rate per 1,000 persons for each type of offense.

Population and crime rates
Population	45,794	
Violent crime	84	1.83
Homicide	1	0.02
Forcible rape	16	0.35
Robbery	14	0.31
Aggravated assault	53	1.16
Property crime	523	11.42
Burglary	284	6.20
Larceny-theft (Note: Only larceny-theft cases involving property over $400 in value are reported as property crimes.)	405	8.84
Motor vehicle theft	99	2.16
Arson	8	0.17

=== Cities by population and crime rates ===
Cities by population and crime rates
City	Population	Violent crimes	Violent crime rate per 1,000 persons	Property crimes	Property crime rate per 1,000 persons
City of Angels	3,826	14	3.66	86	22.48

== Transportation ==
=== Major highways ===
- State Route 4
- State Route 12
- State Route 26
- State Route 49

=== Public transportation ===
Calaveras Connect provides service in Angels Camp, San Andreas, and other communities in the county. Intercounty connections are available to Columbia (Tuolumne County), Jackson (Amador County)

=== Airports ===
Calaveras County Airport is a general aviation airport located just southeast of San Andreas.

== Communities ==
=== Cities ===
Angels Camp is the only incorporated city located in Calaveras County.

=== Census-designated places ===
- Arnold
- Avery
- Campo Seco
- Copperopolis
- Dorrington
- Douglas Flat
- Forest Meadows
- Glencoe
- Hathaway Pines
- Mokelumne Hill
- Mountain Ranch
- Murphys
- Paloma
- Rail Road Flat
- Rancho Calaveras
- San Andreas (county seat)
- Sheep Ranch
- Vallecito
- Valley Springs
- Wallace
- West Point
- Wilseyville

=== Other communities ===
- Cave City
- Jenny Lind
- Milton
- Sheep Ranch

=== Former settlements ===
- Camanche
- Poverty Bar

=== Special districts ===
- Altaville Cemetery District
- Altaville-Melones Fire District
- Angels Camp Fire District
- Bret Harte Union High School Districtf
- Calaveras County Air Pollution Control District
- Calaveras Unified School District
- Central Calaveras Fire and Rescue Protection District
- Copperopolis Fire Protection District
- Ebbetts Pass Fire Protection District
- Foothill Fire District
- Jenny Lind Fire District
- Mark Twain Health Care District
- Mark Twain Union Elementary School District
- Mokelumne Hill Fire District
- Murphys Fire District
- San Andreas Fire District
- Vallecito Union School District
- Valley Springs Public Utilities District
- West Point Fire District.

=== Population ranking ===
The population ranking of the following table is based on the 2020 census of Calaveras County.

† county seat

Rank	City/Town/etc.	Municipal type	Population (2020 census)
1	Rancho Calaveras	CDP	5,590
2	Valley Springs	CDP	3,779
3	Angels Camp	City	3,667
4	Copperopolis	CDP	3,400
5	Arnold	CDP	3,288
6	† San Andreas	CDP	2,994
7	Murphys	CDP	1,995
8	Forest Meadows	CDP	1,276
9	Mokelumne Hill	CDP	691
10	West Point	CDP	688
11	Avery	CDP	636
12	Dorrington	CDP	519
13	Wallace	CDP	479
14	Vallecito	CDP	442
15	Rail Road Flat	CDP	316
16	Mountain Ranch	CDP	223

== See also ==
- USS Calaveras County (LST-516)
- List of school districts in Calaveras County, California
- Calaveras Big Trees State Park
- Mercer Caverns
- Moaning Cavern
- National Register of Historic Places listings in Calaveras County, California
