= California Historical Landmarks in Calaveras County =

BancoQue

List table of the properties and districts listed as California Historical Landmarks within Calaveras County, California.

- Note: Click the "Map of all coordinates" link to the right to view a Google map of all properties and districts with latitude and longitude coordinates in the table below.

== Listings ==
Image		Landmark name	Location	City or town	Summary
Upload Photo	288	Altaville	State Hwy 49 & Hwy 4; 38°04′46″N 120°33′18″W	Altaville	
Angels Camp	287	Angels Camp	Historic district 38°04′07″N 120°32′22″W	Angels Camp	
Angels Hotel	734	Angels Hotel	Main St. and Birds Way; 38°04′07″N 120°32′21″W	Angels Camp	Also on the NRHP list as NPS-72000220
Big Bar (Amador County, California)	41	Big Bar (Amador County, California)	38°18′43″N 120°43′12″W	Jackson	Big Bar mine is in both Calaveras County and Amador County
Upload Photo	769	Birthplace of Archie Stevenot	State Hwy 4, 3.7 miles south of Angels Camp; 38°01′40″N 120°30′24″W	Angels Camp	
Upload Photo	465	Old mining camp of Brownsville	Pennsylvania Gulch Rd. 38°07′43″N 120°26′31″W	Murphys	
Upload Photo	255	Calaveritas	Historic district 38°09′28″N 120°36′44″W	Calaveritas	
Upload Photo	254	Camanche	Historic district 38°12′48″N 120°56′07″W	Camanche	
Upload Photo	257	Campo Seco	Historic district 38°13′38″N 120°51′12″W	Campo Seco	
California Caverns	956	California Caverns	Cave City Rd. 38°12′10″N 120°30′32″W	Cave City	
Upload Photo	274	Carson Hill	Historic district 38°01′42″N 120°30′24″W	Carson Hill	
Upload Photo	265	Chili Gulch	Double Springs Rd. 38°12′58″N 120°42′27″W	Mokelumne Hill	
Congregational Church	261	Congregational Church	Northeast corner of Main and Church Sts. 38°18′00″N 120°42′23″W	Mokelumne Hill	
Copperopolis	296	Copperopolis	Historic district 37°58′41″N 120°38′18″W	Copperopolis	
Courthouse of Calaveras County and the Léger Hotel	663	Courthouse of Calaveras County and the Léger Hotel	Corner of Main & Lafayette Sts. 38°18′04″N 120°42′21″W	Mokelumne Hill	This was the county courthouse from 1852-1866
Double Springs	264	Double Springs	Double Springs Rd. 38°12′19″N 120°47′28″W	Valley Springs	
Douglas Flat	272	Douglas Flat	Historic district 38°06′52″N 120°27′18″W	Douglas Flat	
Upload Photo	282	El Dorado	Mountain Ranch Rd. & Whiskey Slide Rd. 38°13′42″N 120°32′27″W	Mountain Ranch	
Upload Photo	258	Fourth Crossing	Historic district 38°07′53″N 120°38′05″W	Fourth Crossing	
Upload Photo	280	Glencoe	Historic district 38°21′15″N 120°35′06″W	Glencoe	
I.O.O.F. Hall	256	I.O.O.F. Hall	Northeast corner of Main and Center Sts. 38°18′08″N 120°42′22″W	Mokelumne Hill	
Upload Photo	266	Jenny Lind	38°05′42″N 120°52′12″W	Jenny Lind	
Upload Photo	284	Jesus Maria	Historic district 38°17′08″N 120°38′51″W	Jesus Maria	
Upload Photo	262	Milton	Historic district 38°01′55″N 120°51′08″W	Milton	
Mokelumne Hill	269	Mokelumne Hill	38°18′02″N 120°42′23″W	Mokelumne Hill	
Murphys	275	Murphys	Historic district 38°08′15″N 120°27′35″W	Murphys	
Murphys Hotel	267	Murphys Hotel	457 Main at Algiers St. 38°08′16″N 120°27′54″W	Murphys	Also known as Mitchler Hotel. Also on the NRHP list as NPS-71000134
O'Byrne Ferry	281	O'Byrne Ferry	O'Byrne Ferry Rd. 37°53′49″N 120°34′34″W	Copperopolis	
Upload Photo	295	Paloma	Paloma Rd. & Edster St. 38°15′33″N 120°45′42″W	Paloma	
Upload Photo	466	Peter L. Traver Building	470 Main St. 38°08′16″N 120°27′54″W	Murphys	
Upload Photo	271	Pioneer Cemetery	State Hwy 12, .7 miles west of State Hwy 49 junction 38°12′31″N 120°42′29″W	San Andreas	
Upload Photo	735	Prince-Garibaldi Building	298 S. Main St. 38°04′46″N 120°33′15″W	Altaville	
Upload Photo	286	Rail Road Flat	Historic district 38°20′36″N 120°30′44″W	Rail Road Flat	
Red Brick Grammar School	499	Red Brick Grammar School	125 N. Main St. 38°04′59″N 120°33′43″W	Altaville	Also on the NRHP list as NPS-79000471
Upload Photo	276	Robinson's Ferry	Vista point on State Hwy 49; 38°00′33″N 120°30′17″W	Angels Camp	
San Andreas	252	San Andreas	Historic district 38°11′46″N 120°40′50″W	San Andreas	
Sandy Gulch	253	Sandy Gulch	Historic district 38°22′49″N 120°31′58″W	Sandy Gulch	
Stone Corral	263	Stone Corral	Stone Corral Ranch, Hwy 26, 38°06′06″N 120°55′35″W	Rancho Calaveras	
Upload Photo	273	Vallecito	Historic district 38°05′25″N 120°28′25″W	Vallecito	
Vallecito Bell Monument	370	Vallecito Bell Monument	Church St. & Cemetery Ln. 38°05′11″N 120°28′27″W	Vallecito	
Upload Photo	251	Valley Springs	Historic district 38°11′30″N 120°49′45″W	Valley Springs	
Upload Photo	268	West Point	Historic district 38°23′57″N 120°31′39″W	West Point	

== See also ==
- List of California Historical Landmarks
- National Register of Historic Places listings in Calaveras County, California
