= Stone Corral, California =

Historical place in Calaveras County, United States

Stone Corral Site
- Stone Corral community event in 1900

- Location within California Location within the United States
- 38.1016°N 120.926°W
- Location: Stone Corral Ranch, Hwy 26, Rancho Calaveras, California

History
- Built: 1849

California Historical Landmark
- Designated: September 3, 1937
- Reference no.: 263

The Stone Corral in Rancho Calaveras, California in Calaveras County is historical site of the old west California Gold Rush. The Stone Corral site is a California Historical Landmark No. 263 listed on September 3, 1937. The Stone Corral had a hotel, barns. It was named after the large horses and cattle corrals it had. The stop was built to support those stopping on their way from local mines to Stockton, California. On the road at the Stone Corral a Methodist church, the Stone Corral Community Church was built. The Stone Corral Community Church lost in 1913 fire, but was rebuilt and still stand in Stone Corral. The site is on the current California State Route 26, near Shelton Road, north of the Calaveras River and west of the Jenny Lind, California.

== See also ==
- California Historical Landmarks in Calaveras County
