= California State Route 26 =

Highway in California

State Route 26
- SR 26 highlighted in red

Route information
- Maintained by Caltrans
- Length: 62.162 mi (100.040 km) This route is broken into pieces, and the length does not reflect the overlaps that would be required to make the route continuous.
- Existed: 1964–present

Major junctions
- West end: SR 99 near Stockton
- SR 12 from Valley Springs to east of Valley Springs; SR 49 in Mokelumne Hill
- East end: SR 88 near Pioneer

Location
- Country: United States
- State: California
- Counties: San Joaquin, Calaveras, Amador

Highway system
- State highways in California; Interstate; US; State; Scenic; History; Pre‑1964; Unconstructed; Deleted; Freeways
← SR 25	→ SR 27

State Route 26 (SR 26) is a state highway in the U.S. state of California, running from State Route 99 in Stockton in San Joaquin County to State Route 88 near Pioneer in Amador County. The highway is routed to serve Mokelumne Hill and West Point in Calaveras County.

== Route description ==
Route 26 is defined in section 326 of the California Streets and Highways Code. The definition omits the concurrency with Route 12 instead of duplicating that segment in the other route's definition in the code:

Route 26 is from:
(a) Route 99 in Stockton to Route 12 at Valley Springs.
(b) Route 12 to Route 88 near Pioneer Station via Mokelumne Hill and West Point.

The route begins at an interchange with SR 99 in eastern Stockton. SR 26 then exits Stockton after crossing a canal and heads eastward. After crossing Jack Tone Road, the direction of the highway turns slightly more northeasterly. The road then briefly enters the city of Linden, before intersecting Escalon-Bellota Road. Following another intersection with Jenny Lind Road, the route enters the city of Rancho Calaveras. It turns slightly more northeastward as it passes through the area. The highway passes by the New Hogan Lake before entering Valley Springs. Here, the route makes an abrupt right turn onto SR 12. The route run concurrent and turn back northeastward as they exit Valley Springs. Shortly after exiting the city limit, SR 26 veers away from SR 12 and heads north. East of Paloma, the roadway meets Paloma Road and again turns northeastward. At Mokelumne Hill, the route intersects SR 49, taking a slightly more winded path. SR 26 enters and exits the city of West Point before making an extremely long hairpin turn. Heading westward, the route enters Amador County to its terminus at SR 88.

SR 26 is part of the California Freeway and Expressway System, and in the Stockton city limits is part of the National Highway System, a network of highways that are considered essential to the country's economy, defense, and mobility by the Federal Highway Administration. The segment between the community of Mokelumne Hill and West Point is named the Stephen P. Teale Highway, after the state senator. The bridge crossing the Middle Fork of the Mokelumne River, near West Point, is named the Tom Taylor Bridge, after a Calaveras County Supervisor.

== History ==
State Route 26
- Location: Santa Monica–Buena Park
- Existed: 1937–1964

State Route 8
- Existed: 1934–1964

The original road called State Route 26 ran between Santa Monica in Los Angeles County and Buena Park in Orange County, from 1937 to 1964. That segment was decommissioned during the 1964 state highway renumbering because it was deemed redundant by Interstate 10 between Santa Monica and East Los Angeles, and Interstate 5 between East Los Angeles and Buena Park.

The formerly designated as California State Route 8 between 1934–1964 was then renumbered as present-day SR 26.

== Major intersections ==
Except where prefixed with a letter, postmiles were measured on the road as it was in 1964, based on the alignment that existed at the time, and do not necessarily reflect current mileage. Postmile prefixes include: R reflecting a realignment in the route since then, M indicating a second realignment, L referring to an overlap due to a correction or change, and T indicating postmiles classified as temporary. Segments that remain unconstructed or have been relinquished to local control may be omitted. The numbers reset at county lines; the start and end postmiles in each county are given in the county column.

County	Location	Postmile	Destinations	Notes
San Joaquin; SJ 1.11-20.51		1.11	Fremont Street	Continuation beyond SR 99
San Joaquin; SJ 1.11-20.51		1.11	SR 99 – Sacramento, Fresno	Interchange; west end of SR 26; SR 99 exit 254B
San Joaquin; SJ 1.11-20.51		6.85	CR J5 (Jack Tone Road) – Lockeford, Collegeville	
San Joaquin; SJ 1.11-20.51	Bellota	15.06	CR J6 (Escalon-Bellota Road) – Farmington, Escalon, Modesto	
Calaveras; CAL 0.00-38.33		R4.38	CR J14 (Jenny Lind Road)	
Calaveras; CAL 0.00-38.33	Valley Springs	10.44 9.93 (Note: Indicates that the postmile represents the distance along SR 12 rather than SR 26.)	SR 12 west / Laurel Street – Lodi, Campo Seco, Pardee Dam, Lake Amador	West end of SR 12 overlap
Calaveras; CAL 0.00-38.33		13.87 14.46	SR 12 east / Toyon Circle – San Andreas	East end of SR 12 overlap
Calaveras; CAL 0.00-38.33	Mokelumne Hill	18.07	SR 49 – San Andreas, Jackson	
Amador; AMA 0.00-4.64		4.64	SR 88 – Pine Grove, Volcano, Silver Lake	East end of SR 26
1.000 mi = 1.609 km; 1.000 km = 0.621 mi: Concurrency terminus
