= CA-26 =

CA-26 may refer to:

- California's 26th congressional district
- California State Route 26
- USS Northampton (CA-26), a World War II heavy cruiser
