= Slumgullion =

Slumgullion may refer to:

- Carson Hill, California, formerly called Slumgullion
- Slumgullion Pass
- Slumgullion Earthflow
- An alternative name for American goulash
