= Sandy Gulch, California =

Unincorporated community in California, United States

Sandy Gulch
- Unincorporated community
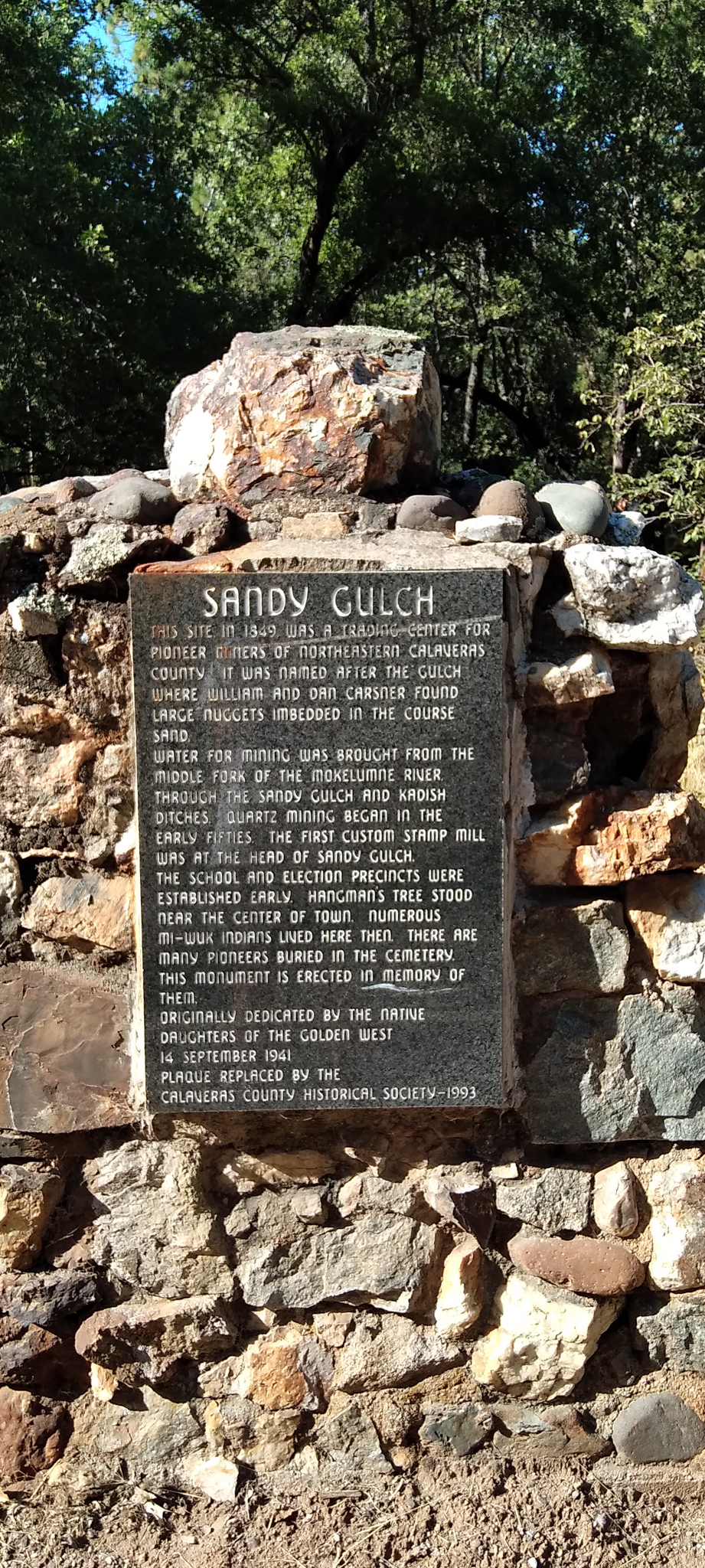
- Roadside monument

- Location in California Sandy Gulch (the United States)
- Coordinates: 38°22′49″N 120°31′58″W
- Country: United States
- State: California
- County: Calaveras
- Elevation: 2,590 ft (790 m)

Population (2016)
  - Total: 42

California Historical Landmark
- Reference no.: 253

Sandy Gulch is a small community in Calaveras County, California, United States, just southwest of West Point on State Route 26. It lies at an elevation of 2592 feet (790 m) above sea level and is located at 38°22′49″N 120°31′58″W. The community is served by ZIP code 95248 and area code 209.

It was established in 1849 as a trading center for miners of the area. The settlement, in an area that was home to many Miwok Indians, was named after the gulch where William and Dan Carsner found large nuggets of gold embedded in the coarse sands. Water for mining was brought from the middle fork of the Mokelumne River through Sandy Gulch and Kadish Ditches. Quartz mining began in the early 1850s, and the first custom stamp mill in the district was located at the head of Sandy Gulch. School and election precincts were established early, and one of California's many Hangman's Trees stood near the center of town.

It is registered as California Historical Landmark #253.

Sandy Gulch is marked by a cluster of homes surrounding the town baseball field. Sandy Gulch is also home to several small home businesses. As of 2016, its population was around 42.

== Politics ==
In the state legislature, Sandy Gulch is in the 8th senatorial district, represented by Democrat Angelique Ashby, and the 5th Assembly district, represented by Republican Joe Patterson. Federally, Sandy Gulch is in California's 4th congressional district, represented by Democrat Mike Thompson.
