= Congregational Church (Mokelumne Hill, California) =

Historical Landmark and Church in California, United States

Mokelumne Hill Congregational Church Mokelumne Hill Community Church
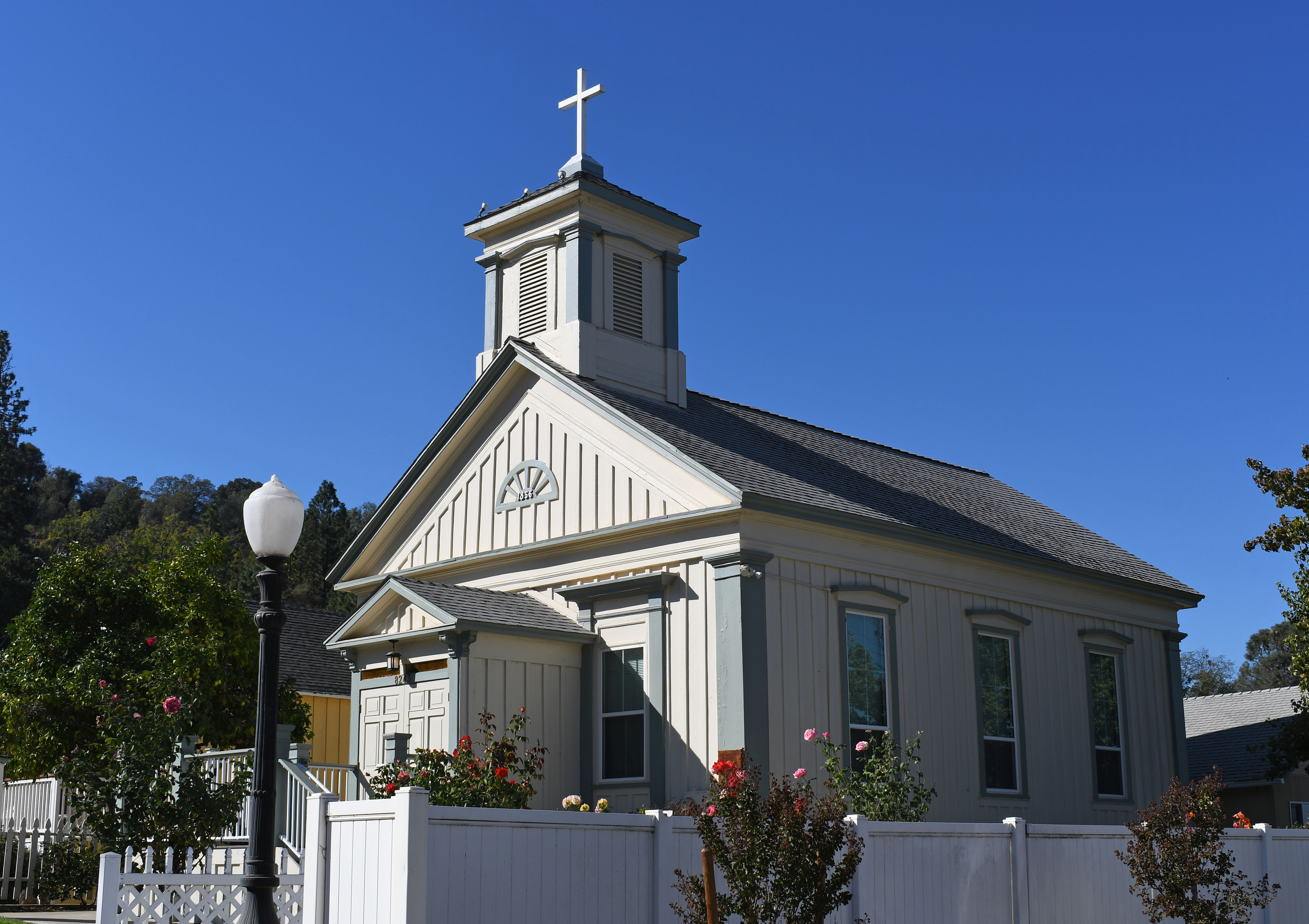
- Mokelumne Hill Congregational Church, now Mokelumne Hill Community Church

- Location within California Location within the United States
- 38.300336°N 120.706416°W
- Location: 8245 Main St, Mokelumne Hill, California

History
- Built: 1856

California Historical Landmark
- Reference no.: 261

Mokelumne Hill Congregational Church, now Mokelumne Hill Community Church, is a historical building in Mokelumne Hill, California in Calaveras County built in 1856. The Congregational Church was founded on August 28, 1853. The first church building built in 1853 was lost in a fire in 1854. Mokelumne Hill Congregational Church is the fifth Congregational Church founded in California. The 1856 building was built by Pastor J. S. Zellie at a cost of $2,700. The funds for the building were donated by miners and fundraising of the women of the congregation. The new church was dedicated on March 8, 1857, by Pastor Joseph Benton of Sacramento. The church has a stone foundation and was built using wood board and batten. The Church's windows were imported by ship from the East Coast of the United States that sailed around the Straits of Magellan of South America. The name of the church changed in 1959 when it was incorporated to the Mokelumne Hill Community Church. The historical building and the church are open and visitors are welcome on Wednesdays at 7 pm and Sundays at 9:30am. The Church is California Historical Landmark No. 261

== See also ==
- California Historical Landmarks in Calaveras County
- Historic preservation
