= Peter L. Traver Building =

Historical Landmark, in Murphys, California, United States

Peter L. Traver Building Murphys Old Timers Museum
- Location within California Location within the United States
- 38.137800°N 120.465100°W
- Location: 470 Main Street; Murphys, California

History
- Built: 1856

California Historical Landmark
- Reference no.: 266

Peter L. Traver Building is a historical building in Murphys, California in Calaveras County. The building was built by Peter L. Traver in 1856. The building is the oldest stone building in Murphys. Being made of stone, built with iron shutters and Peter L. Traver Building placing sand on the roof protected the building from the town's many fires. Fire swept through the town in 1859, 1874, and 1893. Peter L. Traver was a gold Rush miner who opened a general store in the building. Traver sold the building to the Manuel Estate Company in 1883. Over the years the building has been a general store, warehouse, a Wells Fargo office, and auto repair garage. From age and lack of repairs, the building was set to be taken down in 1949. Dr. Coke Wood and his wife Ethelyn after hearing this, purchased and restored the building. The descendants of the Woods family have turned the Peter L. Traver Building into the Murphys Old Timers Museum. In 2016 the Museum became a community museum, run by volunteers and supported by donations and gift shop sales. Many in the community have donated artifacts to the Museum about Murphys' gold-rush history. The Peter L. Traver Building is a California Historical Landmark No. 266.

== See also ==
- California Historical Landmarks in Calaveras County
- Calaveras County Courthouse
