= Mercer Caverns =

Cave in United States of America

Coordinates: 38°09′05″N 120°28′42″W

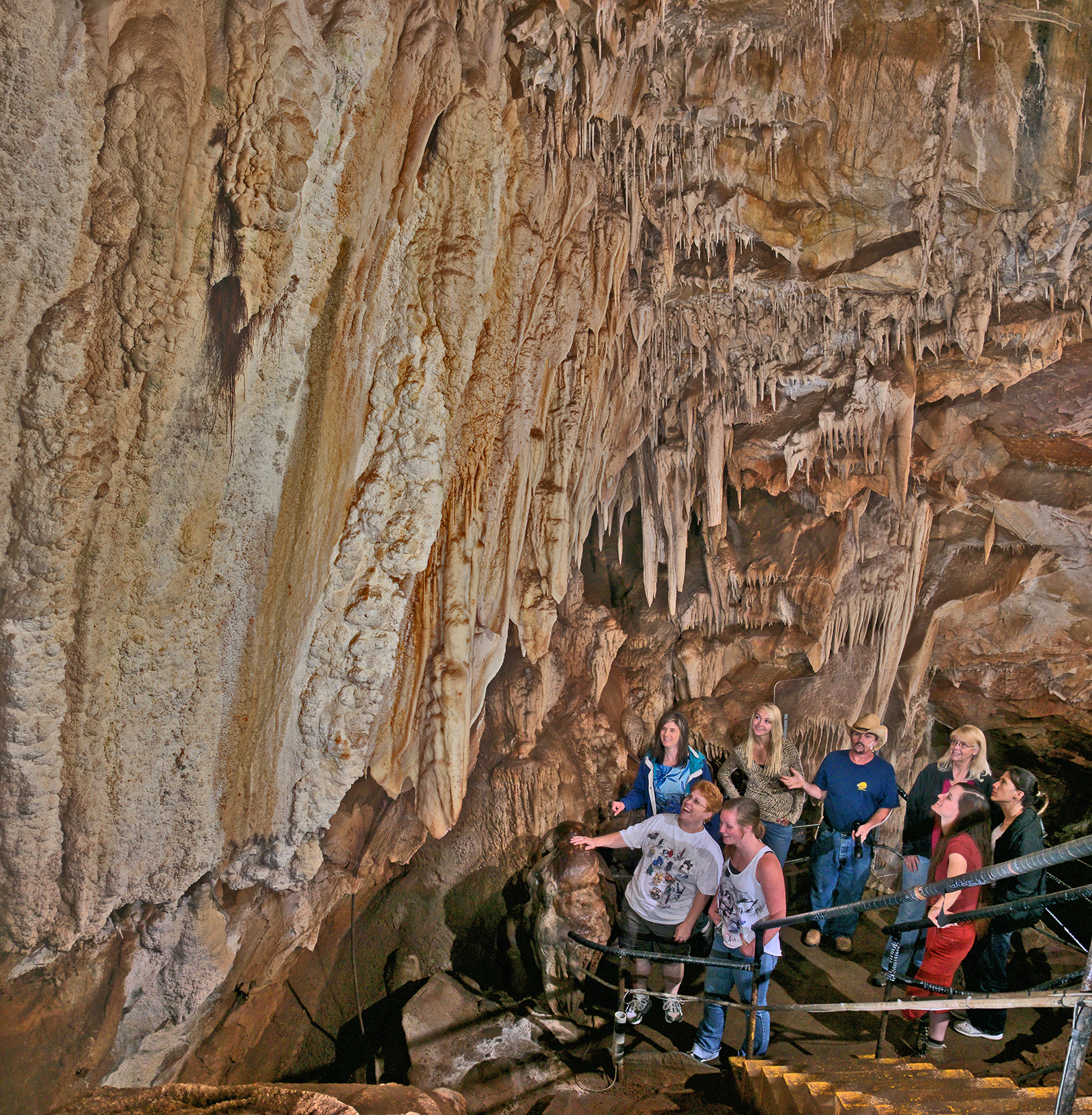
Tour group in Mercer Caverns, California

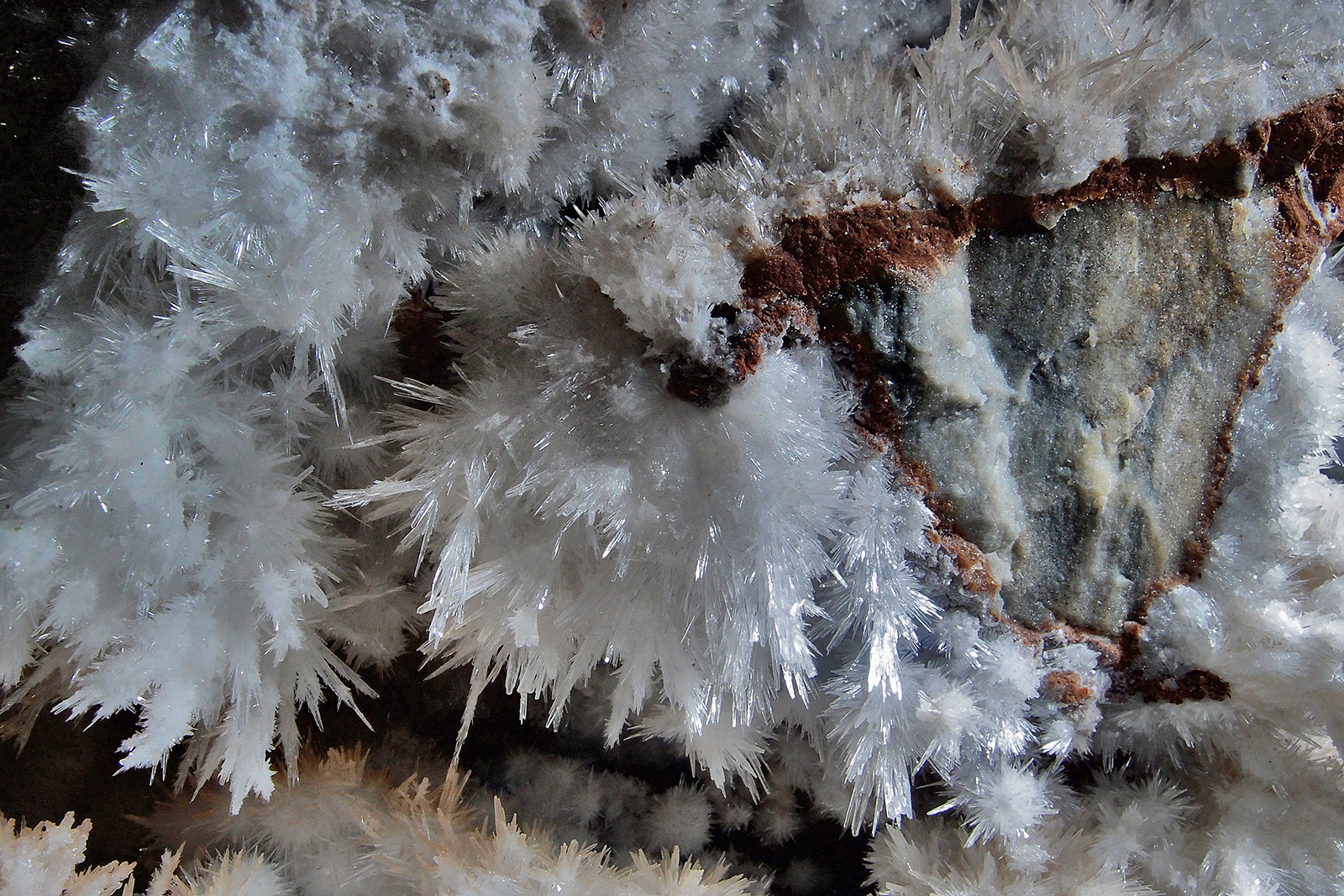
Aragonite in the lower levels of Mercer Caverns, California

Mercer Caverns is a show cave located one mile north of Murphys in Calaveras County California. It is named after the gold prospector Walter J. Mercer who discovered the caves around 1885 and filed a claim. The caverns have a large number of speleothems, stalactites, and stalagmites. It is formed in a marble unit known as the Calaveras Formation. It also contains a large display of aragonite frostwork. The standard tour of the cave descends 160 feet, 208 steps down and 232 up in a traverse between the natural and an artificial entrance. The cave was mapped in 1986 to a length of 3389 feet and a total depth of 192 feet. The map can be viewed on the cave's web site.

== Images ==
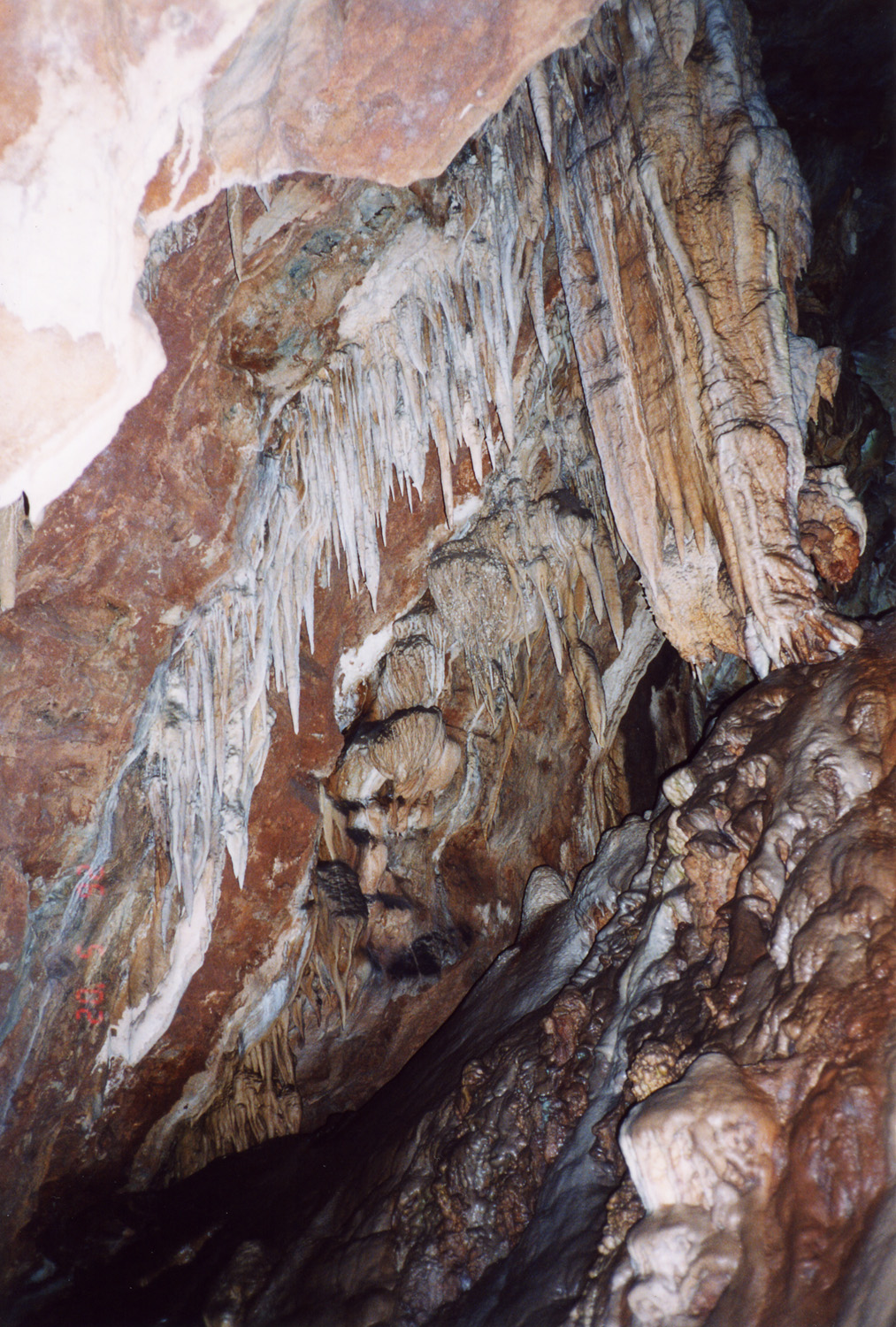

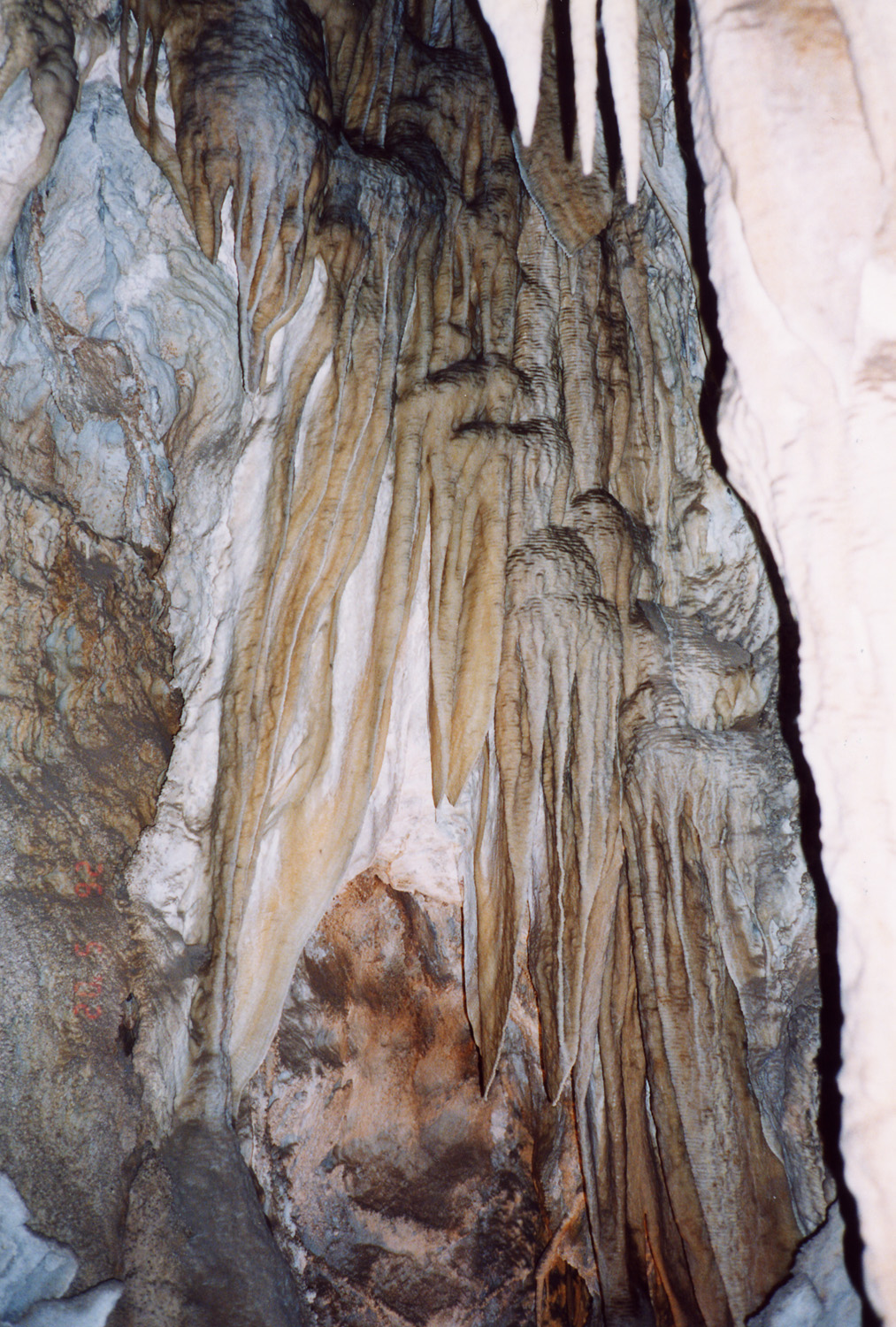
