= Old mining camp of Brownsville =

Historical Landmark California, United States

Old Mining Camp of Brownsville
- Location within California Location within the United States
- 38.128667°N 120.441950°W
- Location: Pennsylvania Gulch Road Amador County, Murphys, California

California Historical Landmark
- Reference no.: 465

The site of the Old Mining Camp of Brownsville is a California Historical Landmark on Pennsylvania Gulch Road east of the town of Murphys, California in Calaveras County. The Mining Camp of Brownsville was a California Gold Rush camp in Pennsylvania Gulch in from 1850 to 1870. The camp is named after Alfred Brown, who was the former owner of the Table Mountain Ranch. There were many rich mines in the area and Brownsville Mining Camp supported this activity. So rich was the area, the Brownsville Mining District limited the size of mines in the District. Each miner could claim and own only one wet and one dry site, no larger than 150 square feet (14 m2) each. Brownsville Mining District was in the area of Pennsylvania Gulches and Missouri Gulches 2 miles from Murphys. There are no remains of the camp, but nearby is the Brownsville Mining District Cemetery. A plaque monument was dedicated on July 19, 1953, by California State Park Commission with the monument base built by Christa Parlor No. 137 and Ruby Parlor No. 49 of the Native Daughters of the Golden West.

Table Mountain Ranch was 1,300-acre ranch that started a mile east of the city of Murphys and ran to the Stanislaus River. The ranch's was bordered on the west by Coyote Creek. George Brown founded the ranch in the 1850, and supported the gold rush miners. George Brown sold the ranch in 1860 to William. Auditt and George March. In 1882 the ranch was sold to Leo Dolan and again sold in 1889 it was sold to William and Ethel Adams, mining engineer from Boston. After their divorce, William sold the ranch to Ethel's father. Ethel ran the ranch and had a herd of beef cattle, Jersey dairy cows, swine and horses. The ranch also became an orchard with English walnuts, almonds, French prunes, peachas, grapes and apples. Ethel died in 1927 and left the ranch to its foreman, Fred Kenney. Kenney operated the Dairy till 1940. Kenney raised cattle until 1963, in 1963 when Kenney sold the ranch to David Kentfield. Kentfield subdivided some of Ranch. Some Hollywood movies were shot on Table Mountain Ranch including: The County Chairman in 1935 with Will Rogers, The Farmer Takes a Wife in 1935 with Janet Gaynor and Henry Fonda, The Red House in 1947 with Edward G. Robinson, and Seven Brides for Seven Brothers in 1954. The only remaining building of the ranch is the Dairy barn on 70-acres, that is now the Indian Rock Vineyards at 38.1300°N 120.4381°W.

== See also ==
- California Historical Landmarks in Calaveras County
- Historic preservation
