= Carson Hill, California =

Carson Hill
- Ghost town
- Location in California Carson Hill (the United States)
- Coordinates: 38°01′42″N 120°30′24″W
- Country: United States
- State: California
- County: Calaveras
- Elevation: 1,447 ft (441 m)

California Historical Landmark
- Reference no.: 274

Carson Hill (also Carson Flat and Melones and Slumgullion) is a ghost town in Calaveras County, California, United States. It sits at an elevation of 1447 feet (441 m) above sea level and is located at 38°01′42″N 120°30′24″W, approximately 4 miles (6.4 km) south-southeast of Angels Camp. It was one of the most productive mining camps in the state, with nearly $26 million in gold and quartz found in the area. Carson Hill is registered as California Historical Landmark #274. The town was served by the Sierra Railway's branchline to Angels Camp until 1935.

Unlike most of the places with "Carson" in their names in the American West, Carson Hill is not named after explorer Kit Carson, but is instead named after Sgt. James H. Carson, a member of Colonel Jonathan D. Stevenson's Regiment of First New York Volunteers. He happened to be in Monterey when the California Gold Rush started. Carson first made his way to Weber Creek near Placerville and then moved south with the Angel and Murphy brothers (founders of Angels Camp and Murphys, respectively). After splitting up at what is now Angels Camp, Carson's group headed south and panned at a small tributary of the Stanislaus River, which they found incredibly rich in gold. They named this portion Carson Creek.

Carson himself decided to move on to other locations, but was unsuccessful. He returned to Carson Creek, but never really cashed in on the success. He died in 1853 of rheumatism, near poverty.

The Morgan Mine was one of the richest mines in the area, so much so that the miners did not even have to dig. They would simply blow up a vein and collect the pieces. The mine was also where one of the largest nuggets in the state was discovered, a 195-pound troy block of gold that was worth $43,000 at the time.

One of the Gold Country's more colorful stories is reported to have occurred here (although several other camps lay claim to a similar tale) during the early days of the rush. The tale goes that a man who had lost his life in a mining accident was being buried in the local cemetery. As the services were being held, one of the mourners noticed something glittering in the newly turned earth of the open grave. The ceremony was forgotten as everyone, the minister included, quickly located a claim.

The town's former name was transferred to another place several miles away, Melones, California. The name Carson Hill was also used by the post office in the nearby town of Irvine.
