= John Marion Murphy =

Canadian-born American politician, businessman, settler in California (1824–1892)

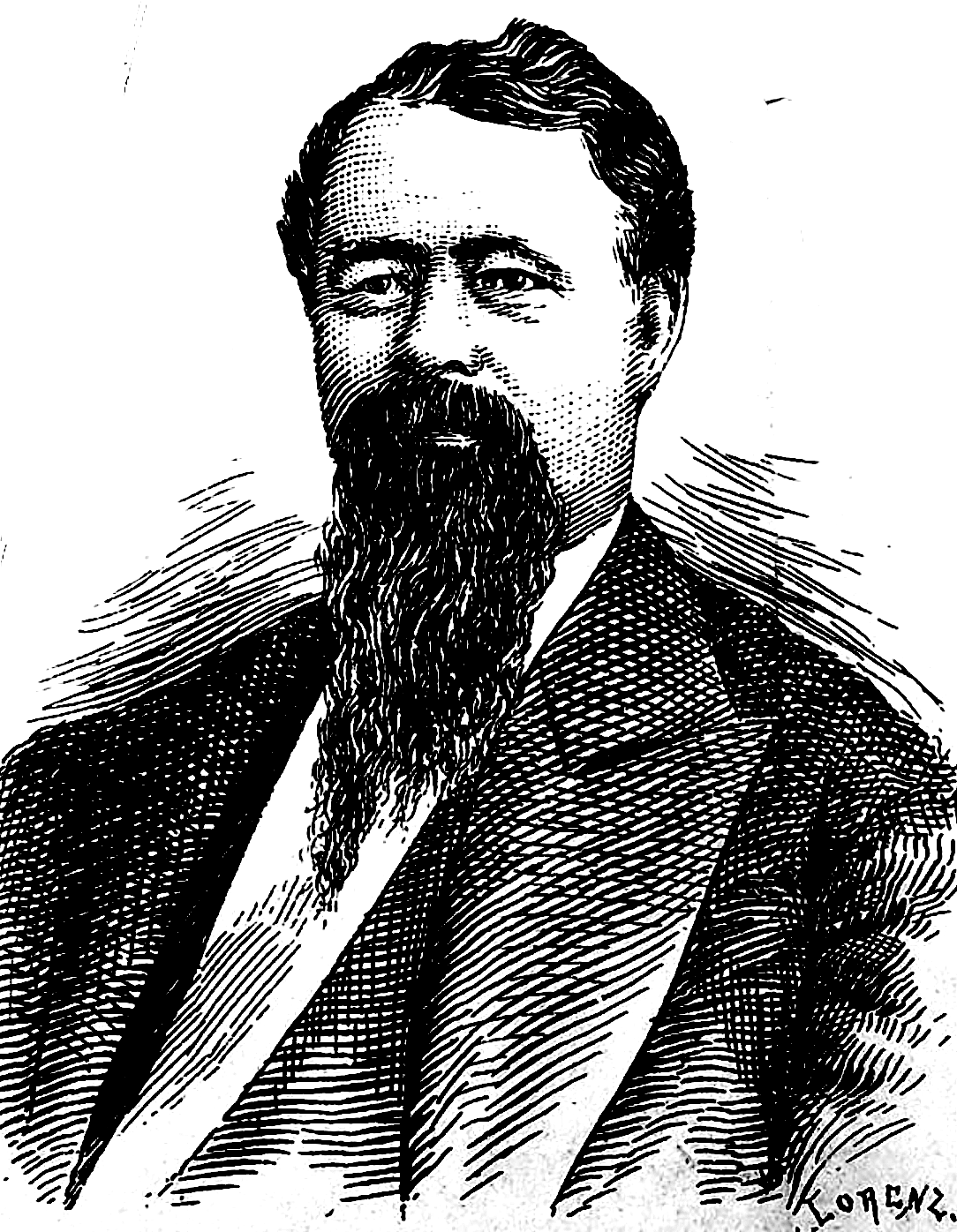

6th Mayor of San Jose, California
- In office July 21, 1856 – August 5, 1856
- Preceded by: Lawrence Archer
- Succeeded by: George Givens

1st Santa Clara County Treasurer
- In office 1850–1852

Personal details
- Born: June 10, 1824 Frampton, Quebec, Lower Canada (now Canada)
- Died: February 17, 1892 (aged 67) San Jose, California, U.S.
- Resting place: Oak Hill Memorial Park, San Jose, California, U.S.
- Party: Democratic
- Spouse: Virginia Elizabeth Blackenstoe Reed (m. 1850–)
- Children: 9
- Parent: Martin Murphy Sr. (father)
- Relatives: Martin Murphy Jr. (brother), Daniel Martin Murphy (brother), Carl David Maria Weber (brother-in-law)

John Marion Murphy Sr. (June 10, 1824 – February 17, 1892) also known as J. M. Murphy, was a Canadian-born American rancher, businessperson, politician, and an early settler in California. He was a member of the Murphy family and co-founded the mining town of Murphys, California. Murphy active in the early administration of Santa Clara County, California, and held many political and civic roles.

== Early life, and migration ==
John Marion Murphy was born on June 10, 1824, in Frampton, Quebec, Lower Canada (now Canada), to Irish parents Mary Foley and Martin Murphy Sr. He was a middle child in a family of nine children.

In 1840, the Murphy family moved to Atchison County, Missouri to a settlement called Irish Grove. His mother died at Irish Grove, there had been many diseases.

On May 6, 1844, Murphy Sr. and his sons gathered a wagon train to move to Alta California (a territory of First Mexican Empire, and now California, U.S.). They were all a part of the Stephens–Townsend–Murphy Party, led by his father. They were the first wagon train to cross the Sierra Nevada.

== California ==
During the Mexican–American War (1846–1848), Murphy served as the first lieutenant in the California Battalion (San Jose Volunteers), from November 1846 to February 1847.

After the war John and his younger brother Daniel Martin Murphy earned a living as merchants, but like many others, they began prospecting when the California Gold Rush began. Their brother-in-law Carl David Maria Weber (married to sister Helen), had formed the Stockton Mining Company in Placerville, California (formerly known as Hangtown). They started mining work with Weber under his company. The brothers eventually decided to go out on their own and moved south. In July 1848, the Murphy brothers found gold at what they called "Murphy's Old Diggings" (now Vallecito, California), and later they moved to "Murphy's New Diggings," "Murphy's Camp," and eventually by 1835 it was just Murphys, California. They founded the gold mining settlement, turned town. The Murphy brothers made far more money as merchants than as miners. Although some sources state John had abundant wealth from this period of gold mining.

After a few years both brothers moved back to Santa Clara County, California, near their father's Rancho Ojo del Agua de la Coche. In 1850, Murphy married Virginia Elizabeth Blackenstoe Reed. His wife was the stepdaughter of James F. Reed, and was part of the Donner Party when she was a teenager. Together they had 9 children, of which 3 children lived into adulthood.

Murphy was elected in 1850 as the first Treasurer of Santa Clara County, a role he held for two years. In 1856, Murphy served as the Mayor of San Jose, California. In 1861, he was the sheriff of San Jose. He also served as a San Jose City Councilman, and the County Recorder for Santa Clara County. Additionally he was also in the real estate business, and worked in insurance.

== Death and legacy ==
Murphy died on February 17, 1892, in San Jose, California. He was buried at Oak Hill Memorial Park cemetery.

The city of Murphys, California is named after the brothers. A historical marker remembering Murphy was erected by E Clampus Vitus in Murphys, California; and a second one dedicated to the location in which the Murphy brothers pitched a tent was erected in 1977 by Matuca Chapter E.C.V. in Murphys, California.

The Murphys Hotel (formerly the Mitchler Hotel) in Murphys, California was named for the two brothers, and is reportedly haunted.

Political offices
Preceded by George Givens	Mayor of San Jose; 1856–1856	Succeeded by Lawrence Archer
