= Vallecito Bell Monument =

Historical Landmark in Vallecito, California, United States

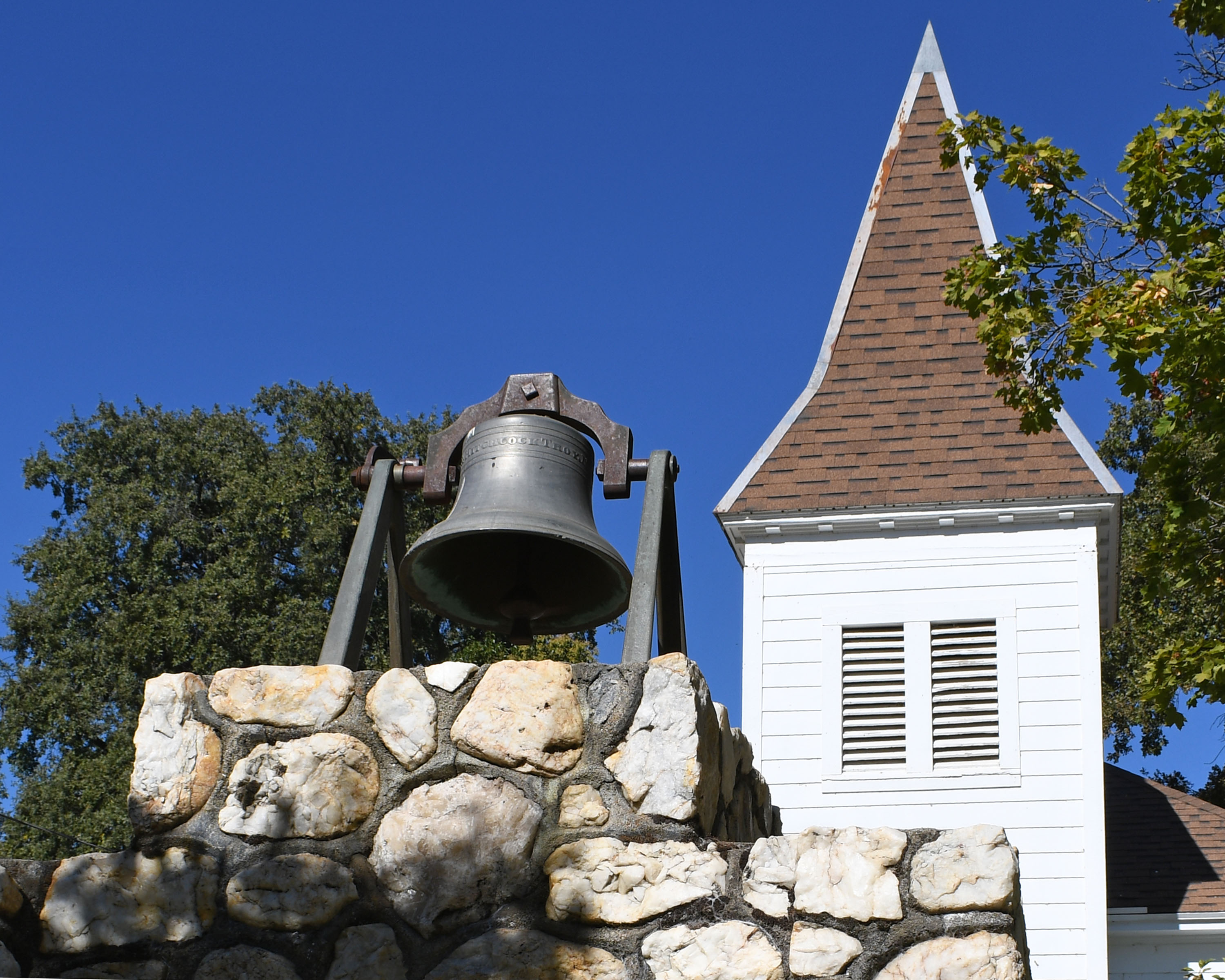
- Vallecito Bell Monument

- Location within California Location within the United States
- 38.086364°N 120.4741°W
- Location: Vallecito, California

History
- Built: 1853

California Historical Landmark
- Designated: April 3, 1940
- Reference no.: 370

Vallecito Bell Monument is a historical bell in Vallecito, California in Calaveras County. The Vallecito Bell was cast in 1853 in the town of Troy, New York. The bell was sailed around the Straits of Magellan of South America to California arriving in 1854. Citizens of Vallecito donated the money to purchase the bell for the city. At first, the bell was hung in a large oak tree and used to gather the town for meetings or emergencies. On February 16, 1939, a storm fell the oak tree. The Vallecito Bell Monument is now at the intersection of Church Street and Cemetery Lane in Vallecito. Vallecito Bell is California Historical Landmark No. 370. Vallecito was named Little Valley by Mexicans of California. The city of Vallecito was a California Gold Rush town, with many miners. The Murphy brothers discovered gold nearby in 1849. The site was called Murphy's old diggings. for a time.

The Vallecito Historic District is California Historical Landmark No. 273.

== See also ==
- California Historical Landmarks in Calaveras County
