= Fourth Crossing, California =

Unincorporated community in California, United States

Fourth Crossing
- Unincorporated community
- Location in California Fourth Crossing (the United States)
- Coordinates: 38°07′53″N 120°38′05″W
- Country: United States
- State: California
- County: Calaveras
- Elevation: 922 ft (281 m)

California Historical Landmark
- Reference no.: 258

Fourth Crossing (formerly Foremans) is an unincorporated community in Calaveras County, California, United States. It lies at an elevation of 922 feet (281 m) and is located on State Route 49 at 38°07′53″N 120°38′05″W. The community is served by ZIP code 95248 and area code 209.

Located on San Antonio Creek, the town was originally named Foremans, after its founder David Foreman, but became known as Fourth Crossing, as it was located at the fourth river crossing on the Stockton–Murphys Road. Foreman had established a ferry to cross the river, which they replaced with a toll bridge. The bridge is still standing to the west of the bridge that Highway 49 runs on.

The town was famous in the 1850s for its rich placer ores, which were replaced by lode mining. After the gold ran out, the town continued to operate as an important stagecoach and freighting depot, serving the Southern Mines until after the turn of the 20th century. The county's first Justice Court was established here, complete with a Justice of the Peace.

Today the town is little more than a few buildings and it is registered as California Historical Landmark #258.

A post office was opened in 1855, discontinued in 1888, re-established in 1892, and permanently closed in 1925.

== Politics ==
In the state legislature, Fourth Crossing is in the 8th senatorial district, represented by Democrat Angelique Ashby, and the 5th Assembly district, represented by Republican Joe Patterson. Federally, Fourth Crossing is in California's 4th congressional district, represented by Democrat Mike Thompson.
