= James H. Carson =

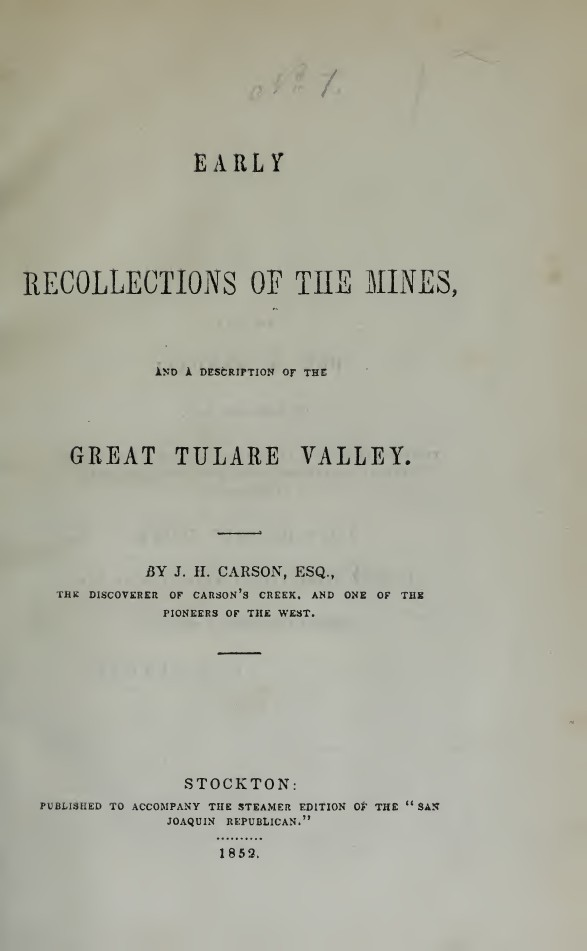
Early Recollections of the Mines (1852)

James H. Carson (1821 – 1853), a Second Sergeant in the US Army, boarded the U.S. Lexington with his regiment and set sail for California in 1846. After passing through Rio de Janeiro and Cape Horn, Carson reached Monterey, California in January 1847. When gold was discovered, many members of the regiment deserted, and eventually Carson did the same. By all accounts, Carson found luck in the mine, and although the exact amount is questionable, he was certainly remembered, as Carson Creek and the hamlet of Carson Hill were named for him. Carson's most noted work, Early Recollections of the Mines (1852), documents this time in Carson's life.

Carson continued to prospect, and even helped organize the Carson-Robinson party in an attempt to prospect unexplored territory.

Shortly thereafter, Carson was struck by rheumatism, and went to Stockton to recuperate. While there, the "San Joaquin Republican" printed 31 articles of his, forming the three series of "Early Recollections of the Mines", "Tulare Plain", and "Life in California".

In 1853, Carson ran for, and was elected to State Assembly on the Democratic ticket. Sadly, before he could take office, another bout of rheumatism struck, and Carson died in April 1853.

== Works ==
- Early Recollections of the Mines (1852)
- Tulare Plains (1852)
- Life in California (1852)
- James H. Carson's California, 1847-1853 (1997)
