= Calaveritas, California =

Unincorporated community in California, United States

Calaveritas
- Unincorporated community
- Location in California Calaveritas (the United States)
- Coordinates: 38°09′29″N 120°36′36″W
- Country: United States
- State: California
- County: Calaveras
- Elevation: 1,109 ft (338 m)

California Historical Landmark
- Reference no.: 255

Calaveritas ("little skulls" in Spanish; formerly Upper Calaveritas) is an unincorporated community in Calaveras County, California, United States. It sits on the banks of the Calaveritas Creek at a mean elevation of 1,109 feet (338 m) above sea level and is located at 38°09′29″N 120°36′36″W. The community is served by ZIP code 95249 and area code 209.

Founded by Mexicans in 1849, the mining camp was relatively successful and by 1853, Calaveritas was well established, with one livery stable, two butcher shops, several general stores, restaurants, saloons, gambling halls, and fandango houses. Notorious bandit Joaquin Murrieta was supposedly a frequent visitor to the latter two.

The town reached its peak in 1857, with an estimated population of approximately 800, the majority being Mexican or Chinese, but on August 3, 1858, a fire destroyed some of the buildings. By this time, the gold production had declined and some of its inhabitants moved to other locales.

The town today is registered as California Historical Landmark #255.

Early on, the town was called Upper Calaveritas to distinguish it from another settlement Lower Calaveritas about 3.5 miles to the west. Lower Calaveritas has since become abandoned.

== Politics ==
In the state legislature Calaveritas is in the 8th senatorial district, represented by Democrat Angelique Ashby, and the 5th Assembly district, represented by Republican Joe Patterson. Federally, Calaveritas is in California's 4th congressional district, represented by Democrat Mike Thompson.
