= Glencoe, California =

Unincorporated community in California, United States

Glencoe
- Unincorporated community
- Location in California Glencoe (the United States)
- Coordinates: 38°21′15″N 120°35′06″W
- Country: United States
- State: California
- County: Calaveras
- Elevation: 2,749 ft (838 m)

California Historical Landmark
- Reference no.: 280

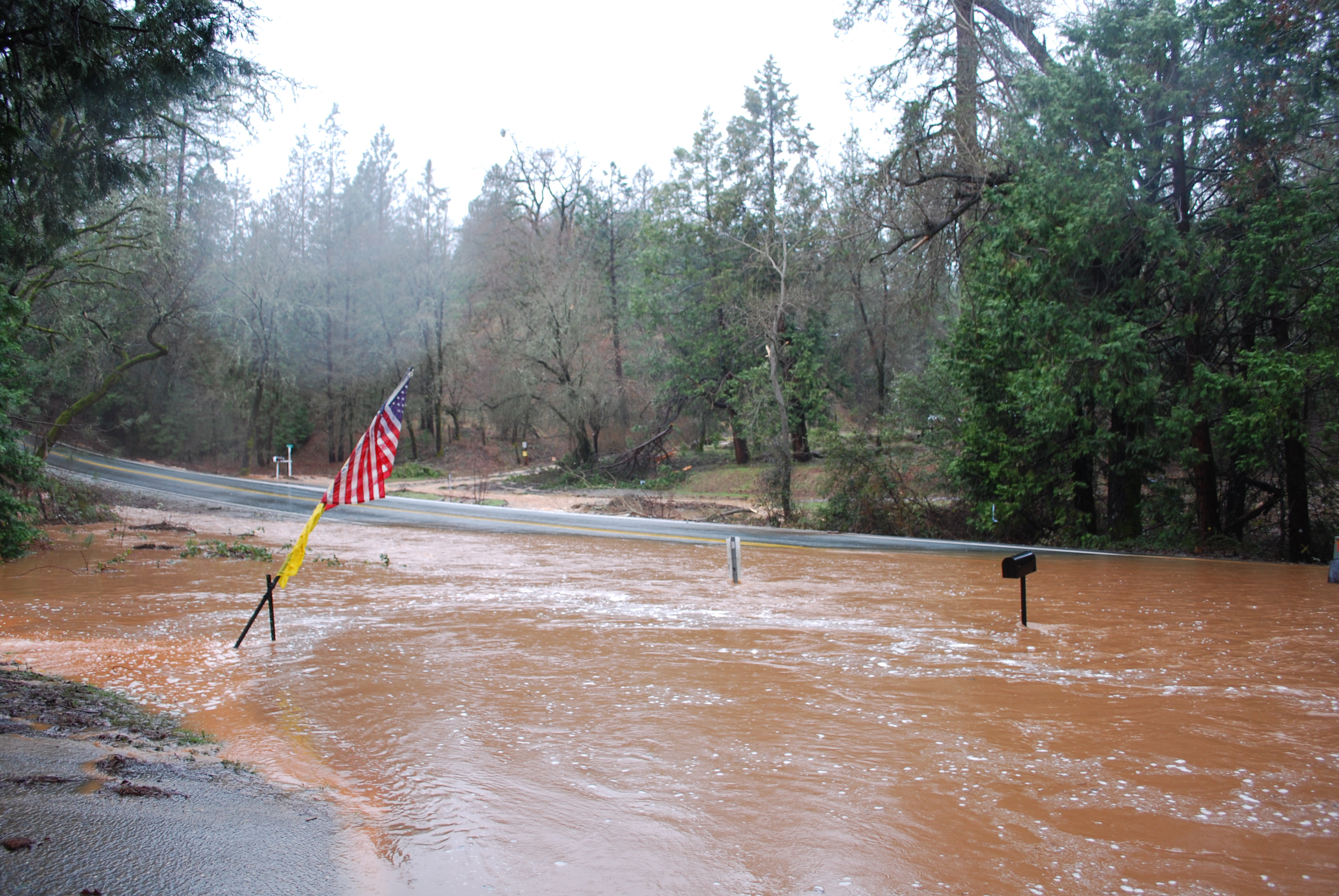
Highway 26 in Glencoe flooded after a large snowstorm

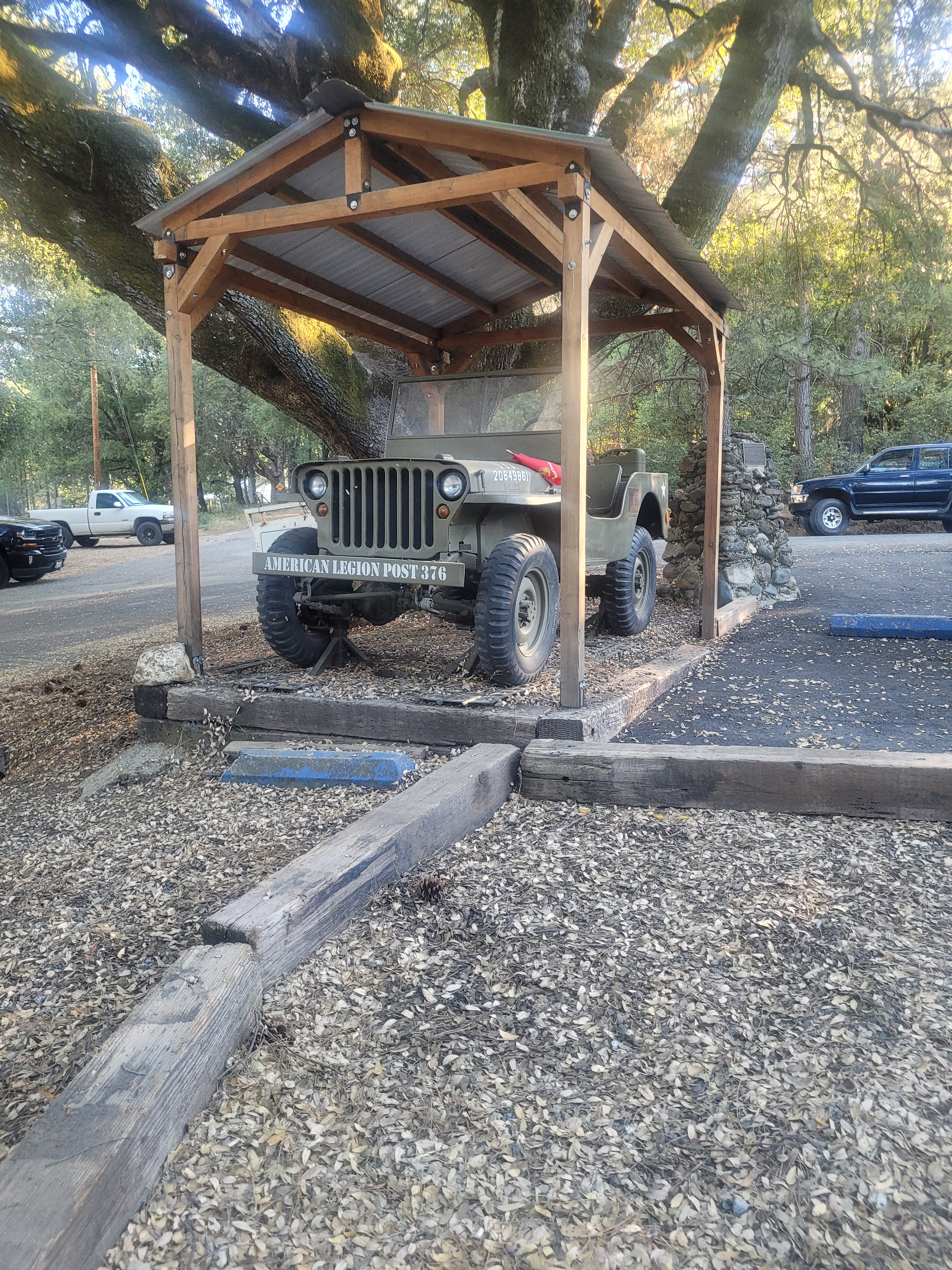
A Willys Jeep that was donated to the American Legion in Glencoe, CA

Glencoe (formerly Mosquito and Mosquito Gulch) is an unincorporated community in Calaveras County, California, United States. It lies at an elevation of 2,749 feet (838 m) and is located at 38°21′15″N 120°35′06″W. The community's ZIP code is 95232. Glencoe has a population of 145 people. Glencoe was named after Glencoe, Scotland, the site of the Massacre of Glencoe in 1692.

Glencoe was formerly called Mosquito, and Mosquito Gulch. The business portion of the town was on the north side of Mosquito Gulch, but not one of the old buildings remains. Currently (As of August 2025) only two businesses remain open in the town, as well as a USPS Post Office and a fire station. The mines were first worked by Mexicans in the early 1850s. Quartz mining predominated but there was some placer mining as well. No mining takes place within the town anymore.

The town today is registered as California Historical Landmark #280.

The first post office was opened at Mosquito in 1858 but closed in 1869; it was re-established as Mosquito Gulch in 1873. The name was changed to Glencoe in 1912; the post office closed again in 1916, but was re-established in 1947.

== Politics ==
In the state legislature, Glencoe is in the 8th senatorial district, represented by Democrat Angelique Ashby, and the 5th Assembly district, represented by Republican Joe Patterson. Federally, Glencoe is in California's 4th congressional district, represented by Democrat Mike Thompson.

== Wildfires ==
In 2022, a large part of Glencoe, California was evacuated due to the Electra Fire (2022). Other fires have affected Glencoe in the past, including the Butte Fire in September 2015.

== Demographics ==
Historical population
Census	Pop.	Note	%±

The United States Census Bureau defined Glencoe as a census designated place (CDP) in 2023.
