= Vallecito, California =

Vallecito
- Unincorporated Community; Census Designated Place
- Location in Calaveras County and the state of California

- Location in the United States
- Coordinates: 38°05′25″N 120°28′25″W
- Country: United States
- State: California
- County: Calaveras

Area
  - Total: 2.087 sq mi (5.405 km^{2})
  - Land: 2.087 sq mi (5.405 km^{2})
  - Water: 0 sq mi (0 km^{2}) 0%
- Elevation: 1,762 ft (537 m)

Population (2020)
  - Total: 442
  - Density: 212/sq mi (81.8/km^{2})
- Time zone: UTC-8 (Pacific (PST))
  - Summer (DST): UTC-7 (PDT)
- ZIP codes: 95229, 95251
- Area code: 209
- FIPS code: 06-81652
- GNIS feature IDs: 268654, 2409394

California Historical Landmark
- Reference no.: 273

Vallecito (Spanish for "Little Valley") is a census-designated place (CDP) in Calaveras County, California, United States. The population was 442 at the 2020 census, exactly the same as at the 2010 census. The town is registered as California Historical Landmark #273. Nearby is Moaning Cavern, the largest cave chamber in California, which the Miwok Indians used as a burial ground.

== History ==
Vallecito was one of California's important early-day mining towns. Gold was discovered here by the Murphy family brothers, John Marion Murphy and Daniel Martin Murphy, in 1849, and it was originally called "Murphys Diggings," which became "Murphys Old Diggings" when they moved on to greener pastures at "Murphys New Diggings" (which became the town of Murphys). The town was revitalized in 1852 when extremely rich deposits of gold were discovered running practically through the center of town. A post office was established in 1854, which is still in use today.

The Vallecito Bell, cast at Troy, New York in 1853, was brought around Cape Horn. It was purchased from the ship with funds contributed by early-day residents and brought to Vallecito to be erected in a large oak tree in 1854. It was used to call the people together until February 16, 1939, when a severe wind blew the old tree down.

The first post office opened in 1854 as Vallicita; the town's name was changed to Vallecito in 1940.

== Geography ==
According to the United States Census Bureau, the CDP has a total area of 2.1 square miles (5.4 km^{2}), all land.

== Demographics ==
Historical population
| Census | Pop. | Note | %± |
|---|---|---|---|
| 2000 | 427 | | — |
| 2010 | 442 | | 3.5% |
| 2020 | 442 | | 0.0% |
U.S. Decennial Census; 1860–1870 1880-1890; 1900 1910 1920; 1930 1940 1950; 1960 1970 1980; 1990 2000 2010

Vallecito first appeared as a census designated place in the 2000 U.S. census.

=== 2020 census ===
Vallecito CDP, California – Racial and ethnic composition Note: the US Census treats Hispanic/Latino as an ethnic category. This table excludes Latinos from the racial categories and assigns them to a separate category. Hispanics/Latinos may be of any race.
| Race / Ethnicity (NH = Non-Hispanic) | Pop 2000 | Pop 2010 | Pop 2020 | % 2000 | % 2010 | % 2020 |
|---|---|---|---|---|---|---|
| White alone (NH) | 402 | 375 | 368 | 94.15% | 84.84% | 83.26% |
| Black or African American alone (NH) | 1 | 0 | 3 | 0.23% | 0.00% | 0.68% |
| Native American or Alaska Native alone (NH) | 13 | 6 | 7 | 3.04% | 1.36% | 1.58% |
| Asian alone (NH) | 2 | 11 | 2 | 0.47% | 2.49% | 0.45% |
| Native Hawaiian or Pacific Islander alone (NH) | 0 | 1 | 1 | 0.00% | 0.23% | 0.23% |
| Other race alone (NH) | 0 | 0 | 5 | 0.00% | 0.00% | 1.13% |
| Mixed race or Multiracial (NH) | 1 | 16 | 25 | 0.23% | 3.62% | 5.66% |
| Hispanic or Latino (any race) | 8 | 33 | 31 | 1.87% | 7.47% | 7.01% |
| Total | 427 | 442 | 442 | 100.00% | 100.00% | 100.00% |

The 2020 United States census reported that Vallecito had a population of 442. The population density was 211.8 inhabitants per square mile (81.8/km^{2}). The racial makeup of Vallecito was 380 (86.0%) White, 3 (0.7%) African American, 10 (2.3%) Native American, 2 (0.5%) Asian, 1 (0.2%) Pacific Islander, 12 (2.7%) from other races, and 34 (7.7%) from two or more races. Hispanic or Latino of any race were 31 persons (7.0%).

The whole population lived in households. There were 167 households, out of which 28 (16.8%) had children under the age of 18 living in them, 92 (55.1%) were married-couple households, 9 (5.4%) were cohabiting couple households, 31 (18.6%) had a female householder with no partner present, and 35 (21.0%) had a male householder with no partner present. 38 households (22.8%) were one person, and 26 (15.6%) were one person aged 65 or older. The average household size was 2.65. There were 114 families (68.3% of all households).

The age distribution was 100 people (22.6%) under the age of 18, 27 people (6.1%) aged 18 to 24, 97 people (21.9%) aged 25 to 44, 106 people (24.0%) aged 45 to 64, and 112 people (25.3%) who were 65 years of age or older. The median age was 44.6 years. For every 100 females, there were 116.7 males.

There were 191 housing units at an average density of 91.5 units per square mile (35.3 units/km^{2}), of which 167 (87.4%) were occupied. Of these, 126 (75.4%) were owner-occupied, and 41 (24.6%) were occupied by renters.

== Politics ==
In the state legislature, Vallecito is in the 4th senatorial district, represented by Republican Marie Alvarado-Gil, and the 8th Assembly district, represented by Republican David Tangipa. Federally, Vallecito is in California's 5th congressional district, represented by Republican Tom McClintock.

== See also ==
- Twisted Oak Winery
