= I.O.O.F. Hall (Mokelumne Hill, California) =

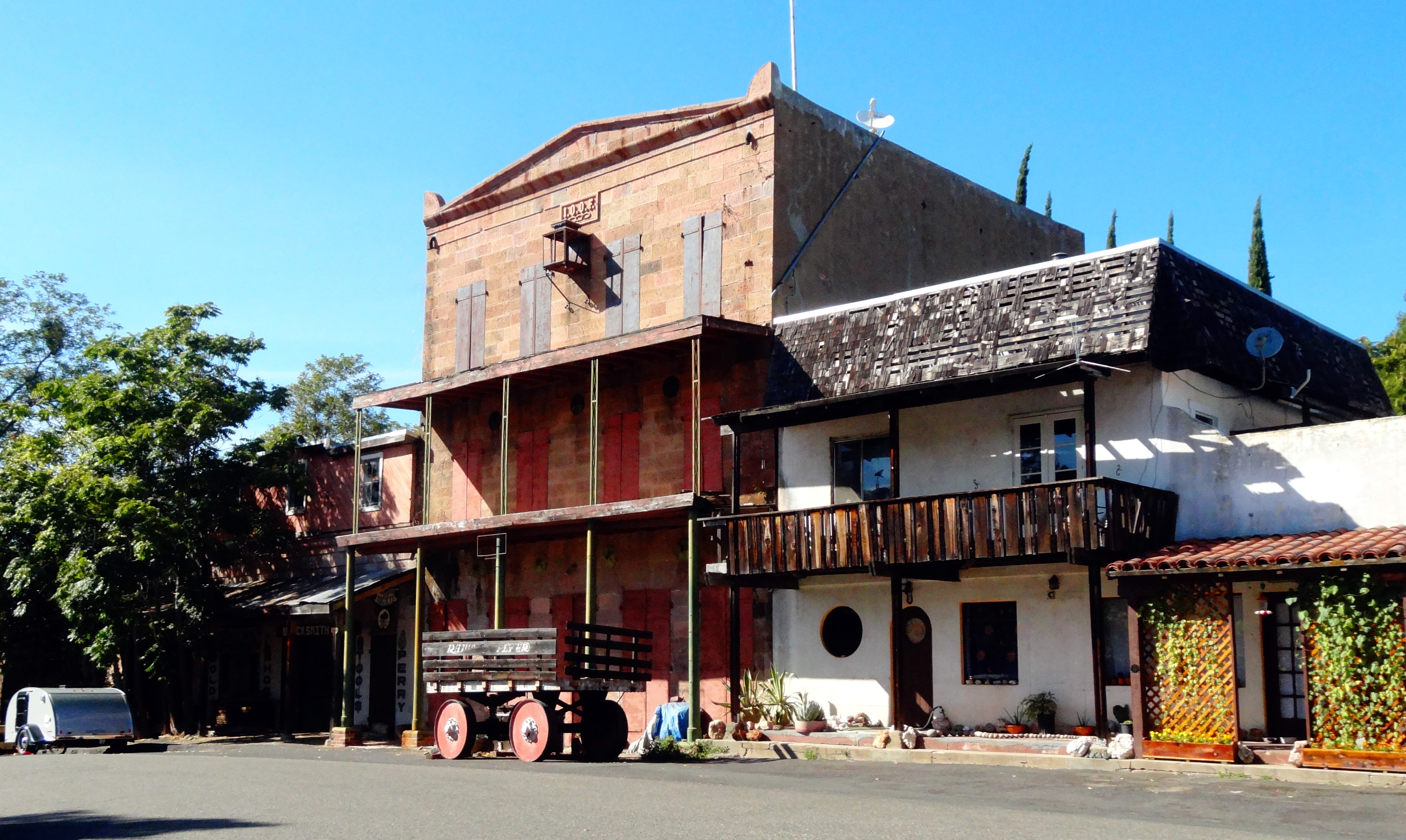
- Location: Center Street, Mokelumne Hill, California
- Coordinates: 38°18′7.77″N 120°42′21.52″W
- Built: 1854

California Historical Landmark
- Reference no.: 256

The I.O.O.F. Hall in Mokelumne Hill, California, which is California Historical Landmark #256, is said to be California's first three-story building to be erected outside the coastal towns. The original building was erected in 1854 as a two-story building. A third story to be used for lodge purposes was added in 1861.

According to a local website:

"The I.O.O.F. Hall is a grand survivor. Built after the first fire in 1855, the building was sold to the Odd Fellows in 1860. The organization immediately began construction of a third story. The Odd Fellows celebrated their feat—constructing the first three-story stone building in California—with a grand ball. Tickets were $6, plus $1.50 for dinner. Some may have grumbled at the price, but the whole town attended. Little has changed. The I.O.O.F. Hall is still party central. The first floor houses the Hole in the Wall, one of the Foothills' liveliest bars."
