= Murphys Hotel =

Hotel in California, United States

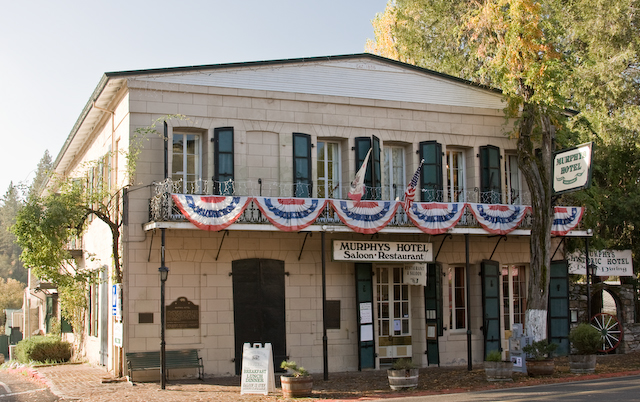
- Murphys Hotel

- Location within California
- Alternative names: Sperry and Perry Hotel; Mitchler Hotel; Murphys Historical Hotel

General information
- Location: 457 Main St; Murphys, California; United States
- Coordinates: 38.1374446°N 120.4671844°W
- Opening: August 20, 1856

Technical details
- Floor count: 2
- Murphys Hotel
- U.S. National Register of Historic Places
- California Historical Landmark
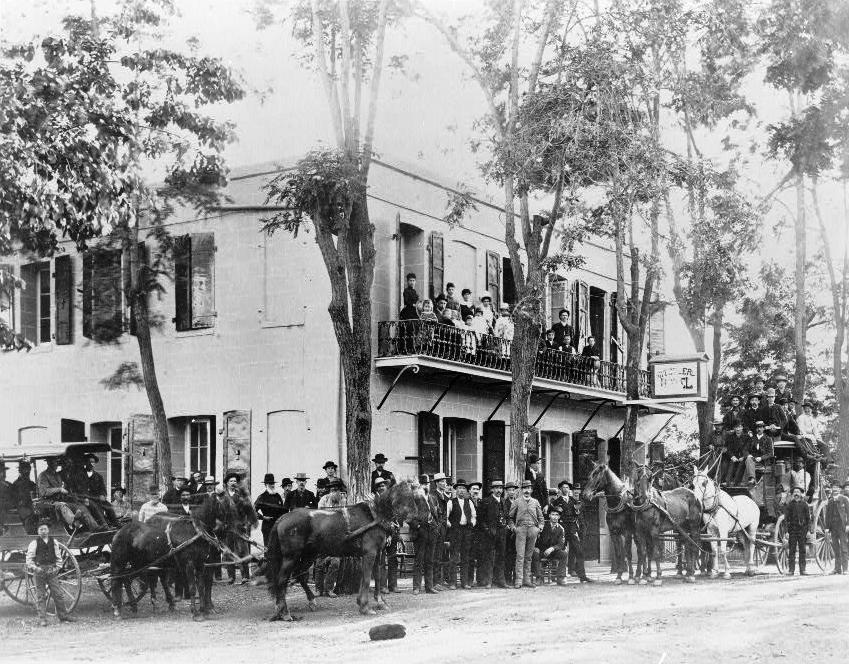
- NRHP reference No.: 71000134
- CHISL No.: 267
- Added to NRHP: November 23, 1971

The Murphys Hotel in Murphys, California, is one of the oldest hotels still operating in the state of California. It was formerly known as Sperry and Perry Hotel, and the Mitchler Hotel.

The hotel is registered as California Historical Landmark (No. 267); and is listed on the National Register of Historic Places (NPS-1971000134).

== History ==
First called the Sperry and Perry Hotel, it was opened by James L. Sperry and John Perry on August 20, 1856. The town of Murphys was a popular stopping point along the stagecoach route from Milton to the Calaveras Big Trees. Thought to be fireproof due to its stone construction and iron shutters, the hotel was damaged in the fire of 1859 that destroyed most of the downtown area. However, it was quickly restored and reopened by spring of 1860.

The new Sperry and Perry Hotel was considered one of the finest hotels outside of San Francisco, and was host to many famous people over the years. Copies of the original register show such signatures as Mark Twain, John Jacob Astor, Ulysses S. Grant, John Bidwell, Charles Bolles (alias Black Bart), Henry Ward Beecher, Horatio Alger, J.P. Morgan and Thomas Lipton.

Renamed the Mitchler Hotel in 1882, and the Murphys Hotel in 1945 by the McKimins family, it has since had several owners.

The Murphy name was derived the founders of the city of Murphys, California, Daniel Martin Murphy and John Marion Murphy, the sons of rancher Martin Murphy Sr. in the Santa Clara Valley.

Gordon Ramsay's Hotel Hell American reality television series covered the hotel in an episode of the series, broadcast on September 9, 2014, on the U.S. Fox television network. It also appeared in the public television series Road Trip with Huell Howser, episode on the Mother Lode.

This hotel is reportedly haunted.
