= Hotel Léger =

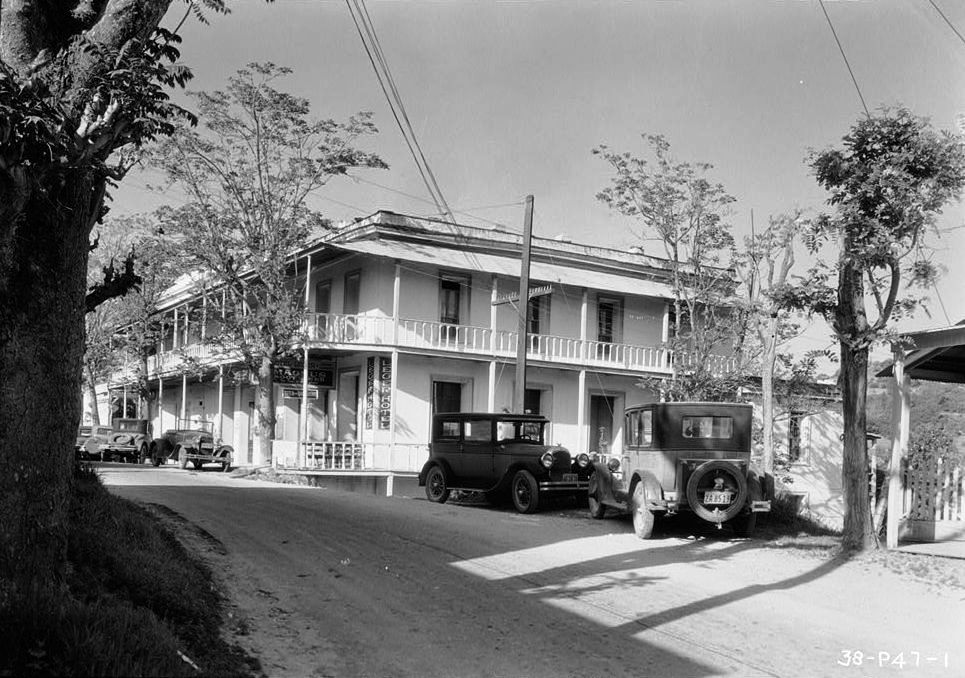
- The Leger Hotel in 1934
- Interactive map of Hotel Léger
- Location: Mokelumne Hill, California
- Coordinates: 38.301067°N 120.705783°W

California Historical Landmark
- Official name: Courthouse of Calaveras County, 1852-1866, and Leger Hotel
- Reference no.: 663

The Hotel Léger, in Mokelumne Hill, California, United States, is one of the oldest hotels still operating in California. The hotel and courthouse building are registered as California Historical Landmark #663, and located in Calaveras County.

== History ==
George Léger, a Frenchman who came during the California Gold Rush, opened his Hotel de France in 1851, as a wood-framed tent. Next door was the Calaveras County Courthouse, as Mokulemne Hill was the county seat at the time.

When the county seat was moved to San Andreas in 1866, Léger bought the court building and incorporated into his hotel. One reason was that it was made of stone and thus had survived two fires that had ravaged the town previously. After restoration following another fire in 1874, the hotel became known as the Hotel Léger, and it has been in operation ever since. The bar, which features a stained-glass back bar with the date 1851 in it, reportedly came around Cape Horn and has been in continuous use.

The former courthouse building was also the location of the county jail, and remnants of the jail cells are in the building's cellar.

== In popular culture ==
The hotel was refurbished by local volunteers in September 2012 for an episode of Travel Channel's Hotel Impossible series. The episode featuring the hotel aired on January 7, 2013. It was also featured on an episode of Ghost Adventures on June 16, 2018.
