= Campo Seco, California =

Unincorporated community in California, United States

Campo Seco
- Unincorporated community Census designated place
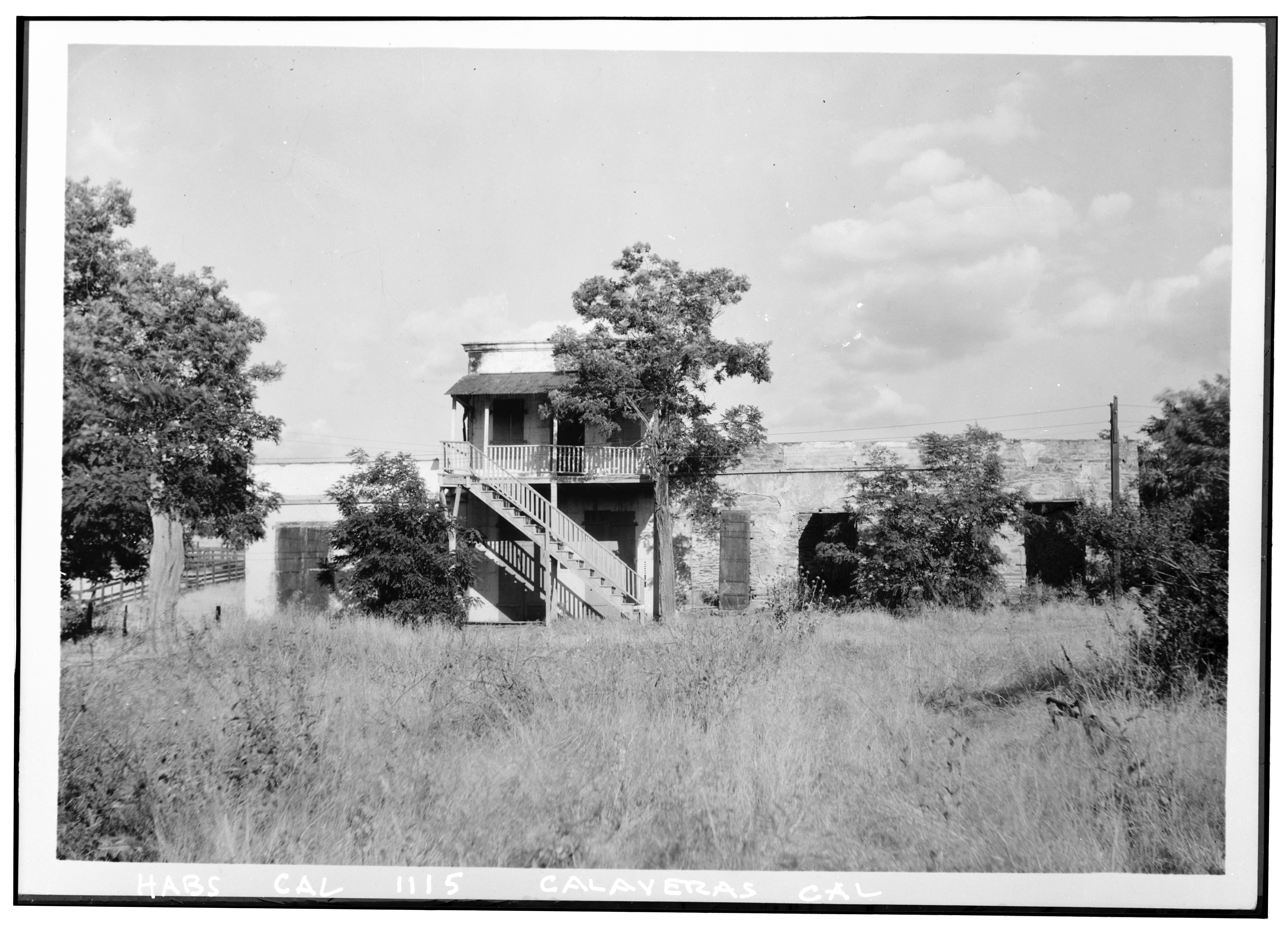
- Robert Eperson Building

- Location in California Campo Seco (the United States)
- Coordinates: 38°13′38″N 120°51′12″W
- Country: United States
- State: California
- County: Calaveras
- Elevation: 564 ft (172 m)

California Historical Landmark
- Reference no.: 257

Campo Seco (Spanish for "Dry Field") is an unincorporated community and census designated place (CDP) in Calaveras County, California, United States. It sits at an elevation of 564 feet (172 m) above sea level and is located at 38°13′38″N 120°51′12″W. The community is served by ZIP code 95226 and area code 209.

Founded by Mexicans in 1849, the mining camp was quite cosmopolitan, with forty different nationalities of miners. The town was almost destroyed by a fire in 1854, but as the placers were still producing, much of the town was rebuilt. Most of the buildings that are still standing date from after the fire. The town also contains the largest living cork oak tree in California, which was planted in 1858. In 1856, Deputy Sheriff Robert H. Paul hunted the Tom Bell (outlaw) gang in the vicinity.

The town today is registered as California Historical Landmark #257.

The first post office was established in 1854.

== Politics ==
In the state legislature, Campo Seco is in the 8th senatorial district, represented by Democrat Angelique Ashby, and the 5th Assembly district, represented by Republican Joe Patterson. Federally, Campo Seco is in California's 4th congressional district, represented by Democrat Mike Thompson.

== Climate ==
According to the Köppen Climate Classification system, Campo Seco has a warm-summer Mediterranean climate, abbreviated "Csa" on climate maps.

== Demographics ==
The United States Census Bureau first delineated Campo Seco as a census designated place in the 2023 American Community Survey.
