= Paloma, California =

Unincorporated community in California, United States

Paloma
- Unincorporated community
- Location in California Paloma (the United States)
- Coordinates: 38°15′34″N 120°45′48″W
- Country: United States
- State: California
- County: Calaveras
- Elevation: 1,362 ft (415 m)

California Historical Landmark
- Reference no.: 295

Paloma (Spanish for "dove"; formerly Fosteria and Frenchman's Ranch) is an unincorporated community in Calaveras County, California, United States. It lies at an elevation of 1362 feet (415 m) and is located at 38°15′34″N 120°45′48″W. The community is served by ZIP code 95252 and area code 209.

Gwin Mine, Paloma, and Lower Rich Gulch were mined for placer gold in 1849, and quartz was discovered by J. Alexander in 1851. Property here was acquired by William M. Gwin, California's first U.S. Senator, in 1851. After yielding millions of dollars in gold, the Gwin Mine closed in 1908.

The town today is registered as California Historical Landmark #295.

The town's post office operated from 1903 to 1918, when the name was Fosteria - from the Foster family, early pioneers.

== Politics ==
In the state legislature, Paloma is in the 8th senatorial district, represented by Democrat Angelique Ashby, and the 5th Assembly district, represented by Republican Joe Patterson. Federally, Paloma is in California's 4th congressional district, represented by Democrat Mike Thompson.

== Demographics ==
Historical population
Census	Pop.	Note	%±

The United States Census Bureau defined Paloma as a census designated place (CDP) in 2023.
