= Jenny Lind, California =

Unincorporated community in California, United States

Jenny Lind
- Unincorporated community
- Location in California Jenny Lind (the United States)
- Coordinates: 38°6′N 120°52′W
- Country: United States
- State: California
- County: Calaveras
- Elevation: 253 ft (77 m)

California Historical Landmark
- Reference no.: 266

Jenny Lind is an unincorporated community in Calaveras County, California, United States. It lies at an elevation of 253 feet (77 m) and is located at 38°6′N 120°52′W. The community is served by ZIP code 95252 and area code 209.

Located on the north bank of the Calaveras River, Jenny Lind was a placer mining town as early as 1849. Most of the placer mining was done along the hillsides above the river; later the river was mined with dredgers. In 1864 the population was said to be 400, half of them Chinese. Being on the main road from Stockton, it was also an important freighting center for the area.

The town is likely named after the Swedish singer Jenny Lind, although there are several tales about its naming. One story claims it was really named for Dr. John Y. Lind. Another says that the braying of pack mules prompted the miners to use the singer's name in sarcastic humor. Most likely, it was named in the singer's honor, although she never came to California.

The town today is registered as California Historical Landmark #266.

A post office operated at Jenny Lind from 1857 to 1944 and again from 1947 to 1951.

== Politics ==
In the state legislature, Jenny Lind is in the 8th senatorial district, represented by Democrat Angelique Ashby, and the 5th Assembly district, represented by Republican Joe Patterson. Federally, Jenny Lind is in California's 4th congressional district, represented by Democrat Mike Thompson.
