= Murphys, California =

Murphys
- Census designated place
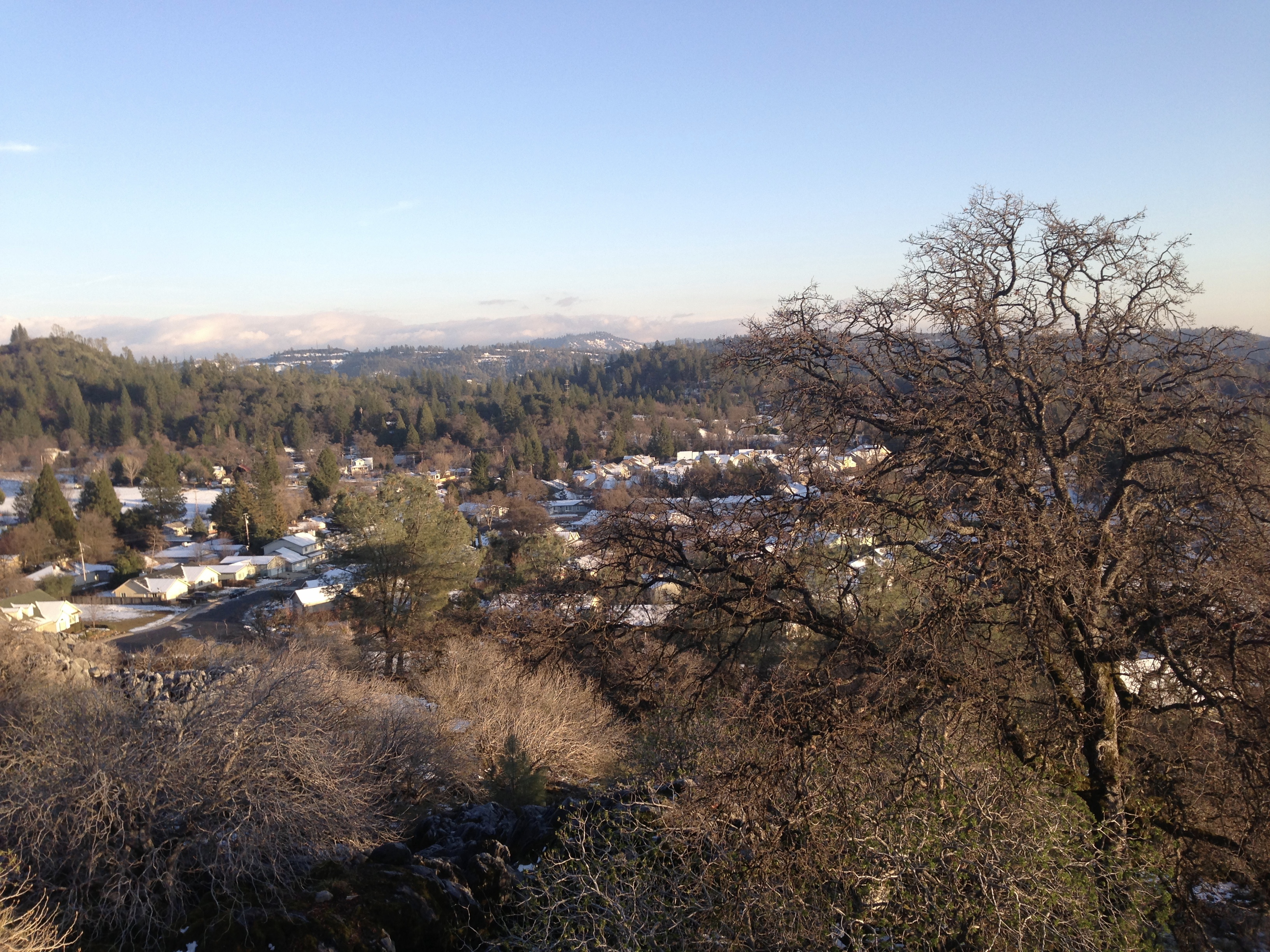
- Murphys in Winter

- Location in Calaveras County and the state of California

- Location in the United States
- Coordinates: 38°8′N 120°28′W
- Country: United States
- State: California
- County: Calaveras

Area
  - Total: 4.23 sq mi (10.96 km^{2})
  - Land: 4.23 sq mi (10.96 km^{2})
  - Water: 0.0039 sq mi (0.01 km^{2}) 0.06%
- Elevation: 2,172 ft (662 m)

Population (2020)
  - Total: 1,995
  - Density: 471.4/sq mi (182.0/km^{2})
- Time zone: UTC-8 (Pacific)
  - Summer (DST): UTC-7 (PDT)
- ZIP codes: 95247, 95229
- Area code: 209
- FIPS code: 06-50034
- GNIS feature IDs: 277560, 2408892

California Historical Landmark
- Reference no.: 275

Murphys, originally Murphys New Diggings then Murphy's Camp, is an unincorporated village located in the foothills of the Sierra Nevada mountains in Calaveras County, California, United States. The population was 1,995 at the 2020 census, down from 2,213 at the 2010 census.

A former gold mining settlement, the main street today is lined with over two dozen wine tasting rooms and surrounded by local vineyards. Nearby attractions include Calaveras Big Trees State Park, Bear Valley Ski Resort and historic Mercer Caverns. The world's largest crystalline gold leaf is displayed just south of town at Ironstone Vineyards. The town also hosts an annual Irish Day parade and street fair every March on Main Street, with some years seeing over 35,000 people in attendance.

== History ==
The area around Murphys was originally occupied by the Miwok.

John Marion Murphy and Daniel Martin Murphy founded the town, they were part of the Murphy family and the Stephens-Townsend-Murphy Party, the first immigrant party to bring wagons across the Sierra Nevada to Sutter's Fort in 1844. They earned a living as merchants, but like many others, began prospecting when the California Gold Rush began. They first started in Vallecito, which was then known as "Murphy's Old Diggings," before moving to another location in 1848 which became "Murphys New Diggings," "Murphy's Camp," and eventually just "Murphys" in 1935.

The placer mining in this location was very successful, but wreaked havoc on the natural landscape. Miners were limited to claims of 8 square feet (0.75 m^{2}) and yet many were still able to become wealthy. The Murphy brothers themselves, however, made far more money as merchants than as miners. In fact, John was so successful that he left town at the end of 1849 and never returned, having amassed a personal fortune of nearly $2 million. Roughly $20 million in gold was discovered in Murphys and the surrounding area. Two of the richest diggings were named Owlsburg and Owlburrow Flat.

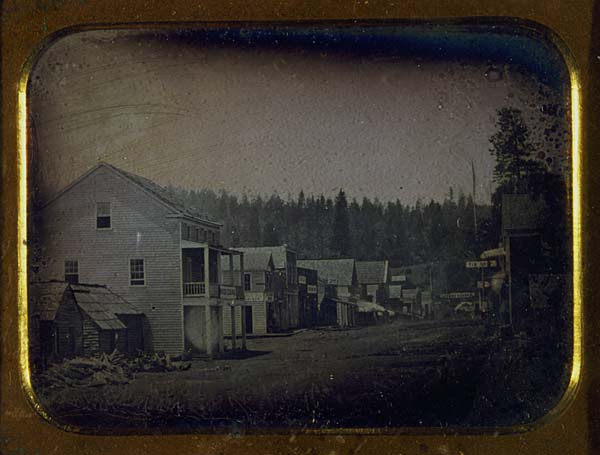
Daguerreotype of Murphy's, California taken in July 1853.

Murphys was also a tourist resort destination, as the nearby giant sequoia trees in what is now Calaveras Big Trees State Park were a major draw, and they continue to be so today. After visiting, John Muir wrote in his book, The Mountains of California (1894):

MURPHY'S CAMP is a curious old mining-town in Calaveras County, at an elevation of 2,400 feet (730 m) above the sea, situated like a nest in the center of a rough, gravelly region, rich in gold. Granites, slates, lavas, limestone, iron ores, quartz veins, auriferous gravels, remnants of dead fire-rivers and dead water-rivers are developed here side by side within a radius of a few miles, and placed invitingly open before the student like a book, while the people and the region beyond the camp furnish mines of study of never-failing interest and variety.

Like many other mining towns, fire was its bane and the town was destroyed three times by flames, in 1859, 1874, and 1893. After the second major fire, there was little gold left to mine, and so the town was never rebuilt to its boomtown condition. However, Murphys continued to thrive as a merchant center, supplying many of the silver mines in Nevada with provisions via Ebbetts Pass. The town is registered as California Historical Landmark #275. A "Hall of Comparative Ovations" built by a chapter of the clampers still stands in Murphys. There is a "Wall of Comparative Ovations" at the Old Timers Museum on Main Street. The plaques on the wall are installed and maintained by members of E Clampus Vitus.

The first post office was established as Murphy's in 1851. The name was changed to Murphy in 1894, and finally to Murphys in 1935.

== Geography ==
According to the United States Census Bureau, the CDP has a total area of 4.22 square miles (10.9 km^{2}), 99.94% of it land.

=== Climate ===
This region experiences warm to very hot, dry summers, with average monthly temperatures above 71.6 °F (22.0 °C), and some days above 100 °F (38 °C) during summer months. Winters are mild, with occasional light snowfall in the early months. According to the Köppen Climate Classification system, Murphys has a warm-summer Mediterranean climate, abbreviated "Csb" on climate maps.

== Demographics ==
Historical population
Census	Pop.	Note	%±
1980	1,183		—
1990	1,517		28.2%
2000	2,061		35.9%
2010	2,213		7.4%
2020	1,995		−9.9%

=== Racial and ethnic composition ===
Murphys CDP, California – Racial and ethnic composition Note: the US Census treats Hispanic/Latino as an ethnic category. This table excludes Latinos from the racial categories and assigns them to a separate category. Hispanics/Latinos may be of any race.
Race / Ethnicity (NH = Non-Hispanic)	Pop 2000	Pop 2010	Pop 2020	% 2000	% 2010	% 2020
White alone (NH)	1,882	1,917	1,649	91.31%	86.62%	82.66%
Black or African American alone (NH)	7	8	4	0.34%	0.36%	0.20%
Native American or Alaska Native alone (NH)	17	16	11	0.82%	0.72%	0.55%
Asian alone (NH)	15	7	14	0.73%	0.32%	0.70%
Native Hawaiian or Pacific Islander alone (NH)	2	10	1	0.10%	0.45%	0.05%
Other race alone (NH)	0	0	13	0.00%	0.00%	0.65%
Mixed race or Multiracial (NH)	22	32	102	1.07%	1.45%	5.11%
Hispanic or Latino (any race)	116	223	201	5.63%	10.08%	10.08%
Total	2,061	2,213	1,995	100.00%	100.00%	100.00%

=== 2020 census ===
As of the 2020 census, Murphys had a population of 1,995. The population density was 471.6 inhabitants per square mile (182.1/km^{2}). The age distribution was 269 people (13.5%) under the age of 18, 76 people (3.8%) aged 18 to 24, 307 people (15.4%) aged 25 to 44, 506 people (25.4%) aged 45 to 64, and 837 people (42.0%) who were 65 years of age or older. The median age was 60.9 years. For every 100 females, there were 82.9 males, and for every 100 females age 18 and over there were 80.4 males age 18 and over.

The whole population lived in households. There were 964 households, out of which 171 (17.7%) had children under the age of 18 living in them, 456 (47.3%) were married-couple households, 53 (5.5%) were cohabiting couple households, 309 (32.1%) had a female householder with no partner present, and 146 (15.1%) had a male householder with no partner present. 335 households (34.8%) were one person, and 246 (25.5%) were one person aged 65 or older. The average household size was 2.07. There were 577 families (59.9% of all households).

0.0% of residents lived in urban areas, while 100.0% lived in rural areas.

There were 1,203 housing units at an average density of 284.4 units per square mile (109.8 units/km^{2}), of which 964 (80.1%) were occupied. Of these, 696 (72.2%) were owner-occupied and 268 (27.8%) were occupied by renters. Of all housing units, 19.9% were vacant; the homeowner vacancy rate was 2.5%, and the rental vacancy rate was 3.1%.

== Arts and culture ==
=== Annual cultural events ===
Visit Murphys hosts the Irish Day parade and street fair in celebration of the town's Irish heritage the third Saturday of March and Dia de los Muertos is celebrated every first Saturday of November. The Calaveras Wine Alliance members host Spring Wine Weekend every fourth weekend in April and Grape Stomp every first Saturday in October. All member tasting rooms are open to the public. The Calaveras County Fair held in neighboring Angels Camp takes place the third weekend of May and features the Jumping Frog Jubilee made famous in the 1865 short story by Mark Twain, "The Celebrated Jumping Frog of Calaveras County".

The Ironstone Concours d'Elegance car show is held annually in Murphys at Ironstone Vineyards every September. Proceeds from the event benefit the 4-H Club and Future Farmers of America. Ironstone also hosts a summertime concert series every year. Past seasons have featured acts such as Coldplay, Sheryl Crow, Willie Nelson, The Doobie Brothers, Earth, Wind & Fire, Lynyrd Skynyrd, Bryan Adams, B. B. King, Huey Lewis and the News, Steely Dan, and ZZ Top.

=== Places of interest ===
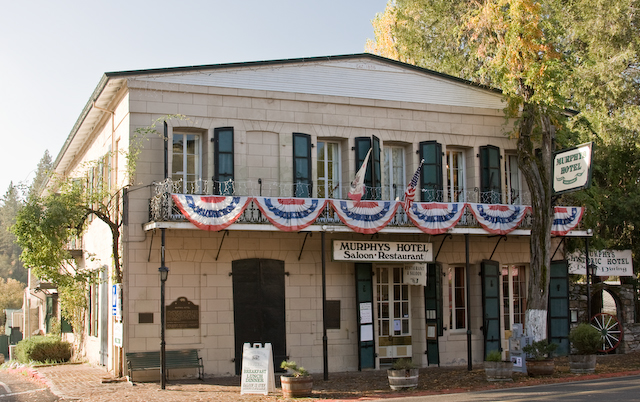
The historic Murphys Hotel in 2007

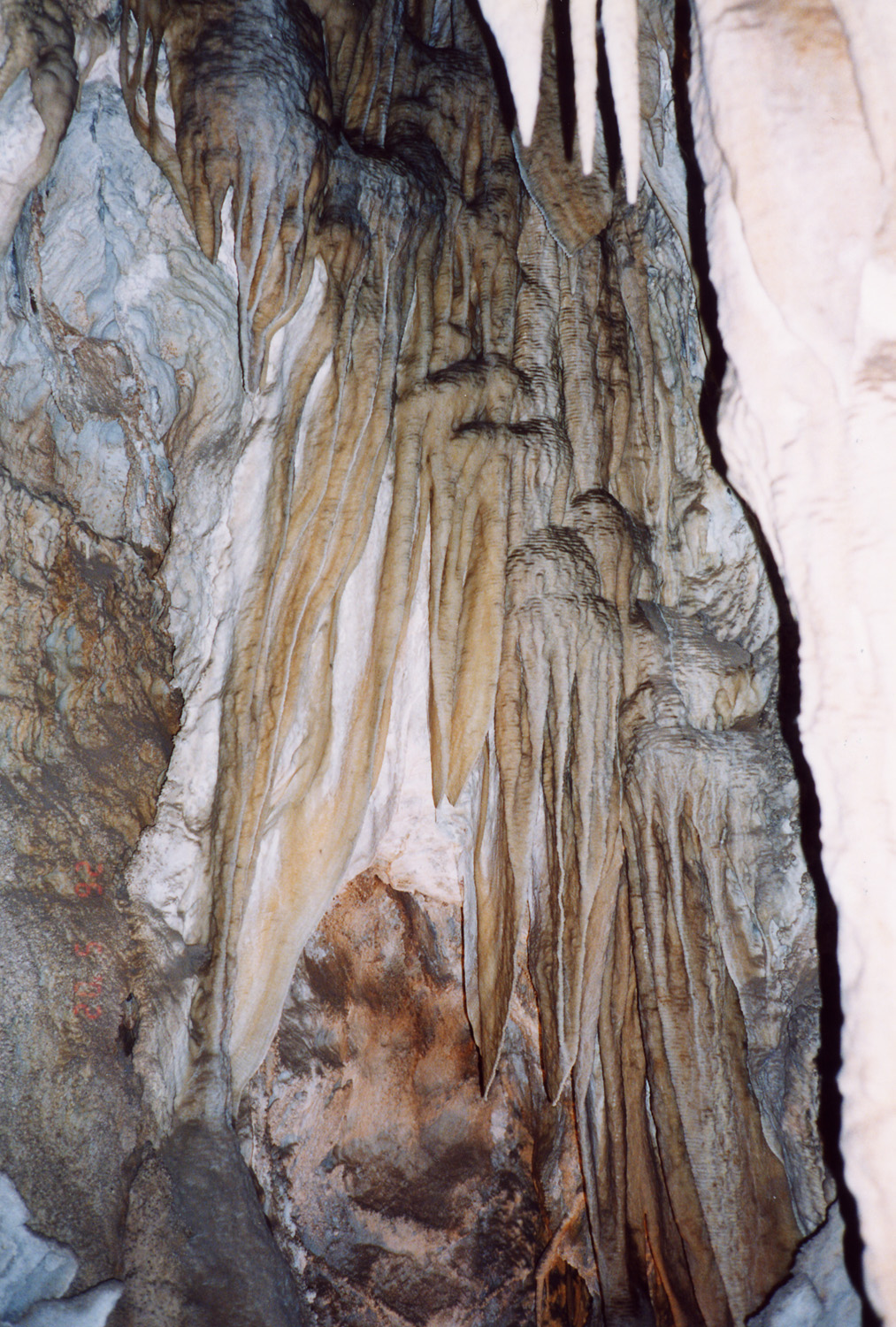
Mercer Caverns

- Murphys Hotel (CHL #267), one of the oldest continually operating hotels in California. Its historic register contains such names as Ulysses S. Grant and Mark Twain.
- The Old mining camp of Brownsville (CHL #465) sits just southwest of the town. Brownsville was a mining camp on rich Pennsylvania Gulch in the 1850s and 1860s. The camp was named for Alfred Brown, former owner of Table Mountain Ranch. Laws of the Brownsville mining district provided that each miner could own one wet and one dry claim, not to exceed 150 square feet (14 m^{2}) each
- The Peter L. Traver Building (CHL #466) is the oldest stone building in Murphys. Its iron shutters and sand on the roof protected it from the fires of 1859, 1874, and 1893. It served as a general store, a Wells Fargo office, and later a garage. Today, it houses a not-for-profit museum documenting Murphys' gold-rush history.
- Mercer Caverns
- The "Moaning Cavern"
- Murphys is also known for its vineyards and wines. There are 25 tasting rooms along Main Street.

== Notable person ==
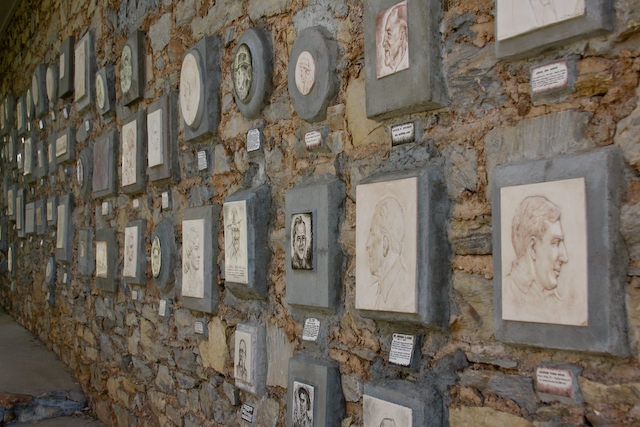
Murphys' Famous Residents Wall

- Albert Abraham Michelson, the first American to receive the Nobel in the sciences (1907; in physics), grew up in Murphy's Camp and Virginia City, Nevada. The elementary school is named for him.

== Politics ==
In the state legislature, Murphys is in the 4th senatorial district, represented by Republican Marie Alvarado-Gil, and the 8th Assembly district, represented by Republican David Tangipa. Federally, Murphys is in California's 5th congressional district, represented by Republican Tom McClintock.

== See also ==
- California Historical Landmarks in Calaveras County
