= Rancho Calaveras, California =

Rancho Calaveras
- Unincorporated Community; Census Designated Place
- Location in Calaveras County and the state of California

- Location in the United States
- Coordinates: 38°07′39″N 120°51′30″W
- Country: United States
- State: California
- County: Calaveras

Area
  - Total: 8.411 sq mi (21.784 km^{2})
  - Land: 8.381 sq mi (21.707 km^{2})
  - Water: 0.030 sq mi (0.077 km^{2}) 0.35%
- Elevation: 528 ft (161 m)

Population (2020)
  - Total: 5,590
  - Density: 667/sq mi (258/km^{2})
- Time zone: UTC-8 (Pacific (PST))
  - Summer (DST): UTC-7 (PDT)
- ZIP code: 95252
- Area code: 209
- FIPS code: 06-59426
- GNIS feature IDs: 1804851, 2409134

Rancho Calaveras is a census-designated place (CDP) in Calaveras County, California, United States. The population was 5,590 at the 2020 census, up from 5,325 at the 2010 census.

== Geography ==
According to the United States Census Bureau, the CDP has a total area of 8.4 square miles (22 km^{2}), of which 99.65% is land and 0.35% is water.

=== Climate ===
Rancho Calaveras has a hot-summer Mediterranean climate (Köppen Csa) typical of the Sierra Nevada foothills. Winters are cool and wet with mild days, chilly nights, and substantial rainfall. Summers are hot and dry with very hot days, cool nights, and minimal rainfall. Due to the orographic effect, rainfall in all seasons is significantly greater than on the valley floor to the west.

Climate data for Rancho Calaveras (Valley Springs)
Month	Jan	Feb	Mar	Apr	May	Jun	Jul	Aug	Sep	Oct	Nov	Dec	Year
Mean daily maximum °F (°C)	53 (12)	59 (15)	63 (17)	69 (21)	79 (26)	88 (31)	94 (34)	93 (34)	88 (31)	77 (25)	62 (17)	53 (12)	73.2 (22.9)
Daily mean °F (°C)	46.0 (7.8)	50.5 (10.3)	53.5 (11.9)	58.0 (14.4)	65.5 (18.6)	72.5 (22.5)	76.9 (24.9)	78.0 (25.6)	73.5 (23.1)	65.0 (18.3)	53.5 (11.9)	46.0 (7.8)	61.6 (16.4)
Mean daily minimum °F (°C)	39 (4)	42 (6)	44 (7)	47 (8)	52 (11)	57 (14)	62 (17)	62 (17)	59 (15)	53 (12)	45 (7)	39 (4)	50.1 (10.1)
Average precipitation inches (mm)	4.13 (105)	3.86 (98)	3.82 (97)	2.01 (51)	1.18 (30)	0.28 (7.1)	0 (0)	0.04 (1.0)	0.43 (11)	1.3 (33)	2.68 (68)	3.74 (95)	23.47 (596)

== Demographics ==
Historical population
Census	Pop.	Note	%±
2000	4,182		—
2010	5,325		27.3%
2020	5,590		5.0%
U.S. Decennial Census; 1860–1870 1880-1890; 1900 1910 1920; 1930 1940 1950; 1960 1970 1980; 1990 2000 2010

Rancho Calaveras first appeared as a census designated place in the 2000 U.S. census.

=== Racial and ethnic composition ===
Rancho Calaveras CDP, California – Racial and ethnic composition Note: the US Census treats Hispanic/Latino as an ethnic category. This table excludes Latinos from the racial categories and assigns them to a separate category. Hispanics/Latinos may be of any race.
Race / Ethnicity (NH = Non-Hispanic)	Pop 2000	Pop 2010	Pop 2020	% 2000	% 2010	% 2020
White alone (NH)	3,487	4,263	4,019	83.38%	80.06%	71.90%
Black or African American alone (NH)	36	48	46	0.86%	0.90%	0.82%
Native American or Alaska Native alone (NH)	50	87	51	1.20%	1.63%	0.91%
Asian alone (NH)	57	82	75	1.36%	1.54%	1.34%
Native Hawaiian or Pacific Islander alone (NH)	5	12	10	0.12%	0.23%	0.18%
Other race alone (NH)	3	2	18	0.07%	0.04%	0.32%
Mixed race or Multiracial (NH)	120	161	427	2.87%	3.02%	7.64%
Hispanic or Latino (any race)	424	670	944	10.14%	12.58%	16.89%
Total	4,182	5,325	5,590	100.00%	100.00%	100.00%

=== 2020 census ===
As of the 2020 census, Rancho Calaveras had a population of 5,590 and a population density of 667.0 inhabitants per square mile (257.5/km^{2}).

The age distribution was 20.3% under the age of 18, 6.6% aged 18 to 24, 22.5% aged 25 to 44, 29.7% aged 45 to 64, and 20.9% who were 65 years of age or older. The median age was 45.6 years. For every 100 females, there were 105.2 males, and for every 100 females age 18 and over there were 102.2 males.

The census reported that 99.9% of the population lived in households, 0.1% lived in non-institutionalized group quarters, and no one was institutionalized. 79.2% of residents lived in urban areas, while 20.8% lived in rural areas.

There were 2,086 households, out of which 29.5% included children under the age of 18, 61.2% were married-couple households, 7.0% were cohabiting couple households, 16.1% had a female householder with no partner present, and 15.8% had a male householder with no partner present. 19.2% of households were one person, and 9.6% were one person aged 65 or older. The average household size was 2.68. There were 1,573 families (75.4% of all households).

There were 2,187 housing units at an average density of 260.9 units per square mile (100.7 units/km^{2}), of which 2,086 (95.4%) were occupied and 4.6% were vacant. Of occupied units, 88.5% were owner-occupied, and 11.5% were occupied by renters. The homeowner vacancy rate was 1.2%, and the rental vacancy rate was 1.2%.

=== Demographic estimates ===
In 2023, the US Census Bureau estimated that 9.8% of the population were foreign-born. Of all people aged 5 or older, 76.5% spoke only English at home, 13.0% spoke Spanish, 1.0% spoke other Indo-European languages, 8.2% spoke Asian or Pacific Islander languages, and 1.2% spoke other languages. Of those aged 25 or older, 92.7% were high school graduates and 12.5% had a bachelor's degree.

=== Income and poverty ===
The median household income in 2023 was $91,629, and the per capita income was $40,143. About 6.8% of families and 11.8% of the population were below the poverty line.

=== 2010 census ===
The 2010 United States census reported that Rancho Calaveras had a population of 5,325. The population density was 633.5 inhabitants per square mile (244.6/km^{2}). The racial makeup of Rancho Calaveras was 4,645 (87.2%) White, 48 (0.9%) African American, 102 (1.9%) Native American, 87 (1.6%) Asian, 13 (0.2%) Pacific Islander, 195 (3.7%) from other races, and 235 (4.4%) from two or more races. Hispanic or Latino of any race were 670 persons (12.6%).

The Census reported that 5,316 people (99.8% of the population) lived in households, 9 (0.2%) lived in non-institutionalized group quarters, and 0 (0%) were institutionalized.

There were 1,937 households, out of which 680 (35.1%) had children under the age of 18 living in them, 1,275 (65.8%) were opposite-sex married couples living together, 162 (8.4%) had a female householder with no spouse present, 98 (5.1%) had a male householder with no spouse present. There were 110 (5.7%) unmarried opposite-sex partnerships, and 18 (0.9%) same-sex married couples or partnerships. 301 households (15.5%) were made up of individuals, and 107 (5.5%) had someone living alone who was 65 years of age or older. The average household size was 2.74. There were 1,535 families (79.2% of all households); the average family size was 3.03.

The population was spread out, with 1,287 people (24.2%) under the age of 18, 337 people (6.3%) aged 18 to 24, 1,148 people (21.6%) aged 25 to 44, 1,845 people (34.6%) aged 45 to 64, and 708 people (13.3%) who were 65 years of age or older. The median age was 43.6 years. For every 100 females, there were 101.2 males. For every 100 females age 18 and over, there were 100.9 males.

There were 2,147 housing units at an average density of 255.4 per square mile (98.6/km^{2}), of which 1,937 were occupied, of which 1,695 (87.5%) were owner-occupied, and 242 (12.5%) were occupied by renters. The homeowner vacancy rate was 3.9%; the rental vacancy rate was 8.2%. 4,519 people (84.9% of the population) lived in owner-occupied housing units and 797 people (15.0%) lived in rental housing units.

== Politics ==
In the state legislature, Rancho Calaveras is in the 4th senatorial district, represented by Republican Marie Alvarado-Gil, and the 9th Assembly district, represented by Republican Heath Flora, Federally, Rancho Calaveras is in California's 5th congressional district, represented by Republican Tom McClintock.

Locally, Rancho Calaveras is represented by Calaveras County District 5 Supervisor Benjamin Stopper.
