= Mokelumne Hill, California =

Mokelumne Hill
- Unincorporated Community; Census Designated Place
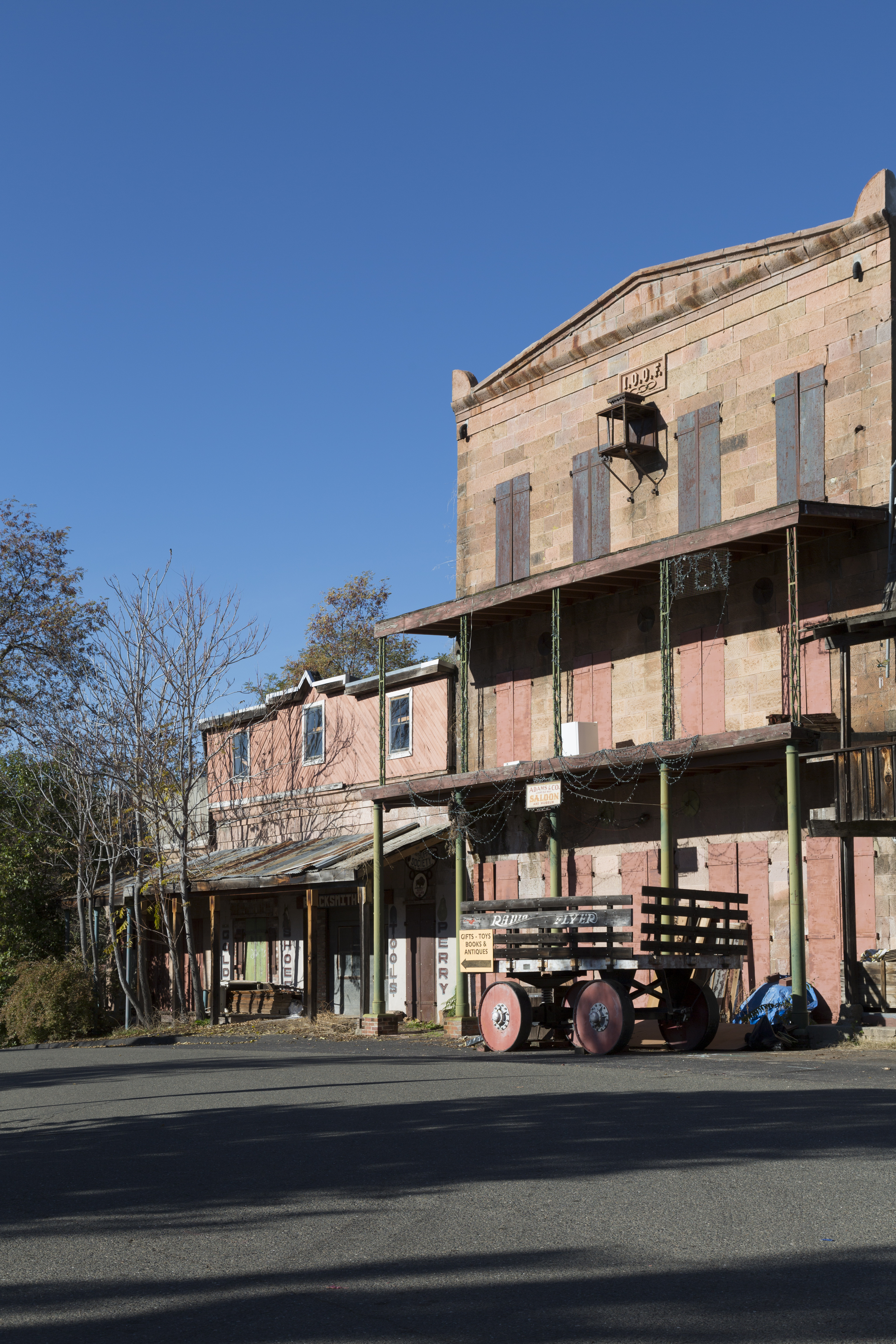
- Main Street building

- Location in Calaveras County and the state of California

- Location in the United States
- Coordinates: 38°18′02″N 120°42′23″W
- Country: United States
- State: California
- County: Calaveras

Area
  - Total: 3.081 sq mi (7.981 km^{2})
  - Land: 3.079 sq mi (7.974 km^{2})
  - Water: 0.0027 sq mi (0.007 km^{2}) 0.09%
- Elevation: 1,473 ft (449 m)

Population (2020)
  - Total: 691
  - Density: 224/sq mi (86.7/km^{2})
- Time zone: UTC-8 (Pacific)
  - Summer (DST): UTC-7 (PDT)
- ZIP code: 95245
- Area code: 209
- FIPS code: 06-48480
- GNIS feature IDs: 228901, 2408855

California Historical Landmark
- Reference no.: 269

Mokelumne Hill is a census-designated place (CDP) in Calaveras County, California, United States. The population was 691 at the 2020 census, up from 646 at the 2010 census. It is commonly referred to as "Moke Hill" by locals. The town takes its name from the neighboring Mokelumne River, which in turn is Miwok for the "people of Mokel," the likely name of a Native American village in the area.

== History ==
Mokelumne Hill was one of the richest gold mining towns in California. Founded in 1848 by a group of Oregonians, the placers were so rich that the miners risked starvation rather than head to Stockton to replenish their supplies (one finally did and made it rich by becoming a merchant). Soon after, gold was discovered in the nearby hills, so much so that miners were restricted to claims of 16 square feet (1.5 m^{2}), and yet many of those claims were reported to have paid up to $20,000.

By 1850 the town was one of the largest in the area. Its population reached as high as 15,000 with people of all nationalities, particularly Americans, Frenchmen, Germans, Spaniards, Chileans, Mexicans, and Chinese. Besides racial tensions, the easy gold attracted criminal elements, and the town gained a reputation as one of the bawdiest in the area. Notorious bandit Joaquin Murrieta is said to have been a frequent visitor to the gambling venues. Violence was a major problem as well. In 1851, there was at least one homicide a week for seventeen consecutive weeks.

On January 3, 1850, the town was site where Chileans involved in the Chile War of 1849 were punished. Three were executed, nine received 100 lashes each and one was cropped. The severity of these punishment stand out as corporal punishment including maiming were otherwise in decline in the Western world.

A June, 1851, incident in Mokelumne Hill has been dubbed California's French Revolution, or French War, by some historians. The previous year the State Legislature had passed the Foreign Miners' Tax Act of 1850. Frenchmen in the area revolted and refused to pay the tax. The Sheriff, also the Tax Collector, summoned a large posse to enforce the act, but the Frenchmen raised the French flag and proclaimed their independence. This prompted the Governor to direct a battalion of militia, commanded by William D. Bradshaw, to suppress the revolt. Disaster was averted when Bradshaw negotiated with the Frenchmen to stand down.

Also in 1851, the first post office was established in the town, and in 1852 the town became the county seat. In the same year a vigilance committee was formed and the worst of the crime was eliminated.

By the 1860s the gold started to run out and the town's population and importance diminished. When San Andreas became the new county seat in 1866, Mokelumne Hill's status declined even further. The town today is a quiet place, with much tourism due to its historic status. From 1959 to 1977 Mokelumne Hill was home to Lucile S. Davidson, known as "the shoe lady of Mokelumne Hill". She was in The Stockton 'Record' and later in the Guinness Book of World Records for having the largest privately owned glass shoe collection in the world.

Mokelumne Hill is registered as California Historical Landmark #269.

== Landmarks ==
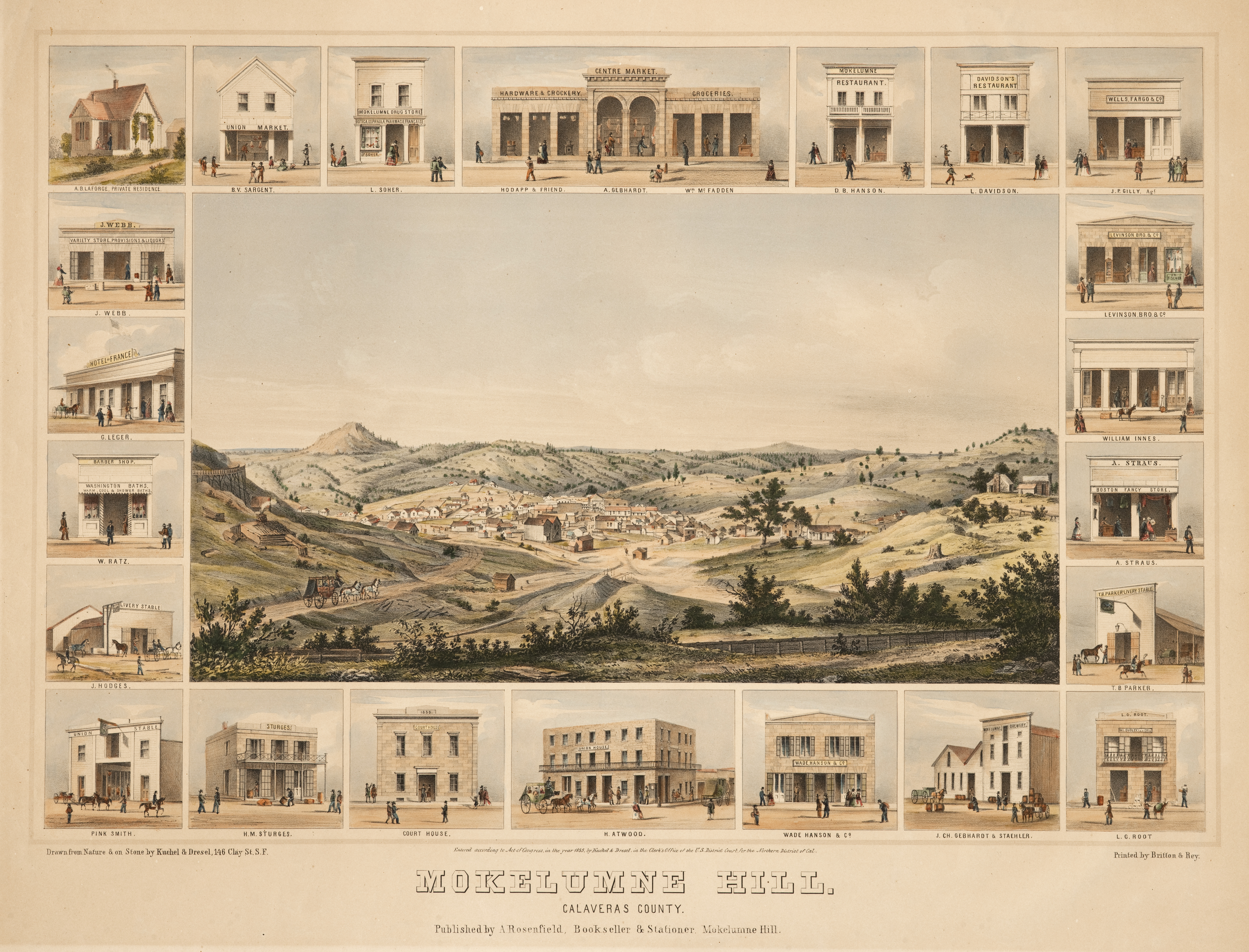
Mokelumne Hill, Calaveras County, California

- The I.O.O.F. Hall (CHL #256) is said to be California's first three-story building to be erected outside the coastal towns.
- The Congregational Church building (CHL #261) is the oldest such in the state.
- The Hotel Léger (CHL #663) is one of the oldest continuously operating hotels in California. One of its buildings was the county courthouse when the town was the county seat.
- The Baldwin Hotel located at 8399 Center Street (corner of Center and Clark) was first built back in 1854, by John Rapetto and his partner John Rogers. Since then it has housed several businesses including Raggio's Stone House up until around 1876, the Baldwin Hotel originally operated by Louis Baldwin, and the Gardella Mortuary, which was located in the basement of the building. When Charles (Carlo) Gardella purchased the property, taking over the Baldwin Hotel, he used his skills as a carpenter to make several additions to the structure, including the veranda and the gable-end gingerbread woodwork which was popular in Victorian design at the time. Charles Gardella immigrated from Italy to the United States in 1861. He eventually settled in Mokelumne Hill, and Calaveras County Marriage Records note that he married Lenora Cataldo on November 11, 1875. The 1880 Census has him living in Moke Hill, and working as a wagon maker
  A photo of Charles Gardella & the Baldwin Hotel in Mokelumne Hill

- The original elementary school in Mokelumne Hill, which is still standing but has been converted to a private residence, was built in 1852 and was used until 1964. Unconfirmed legend has it that a bond issue to build the school failed, but citizens of the town built it anyway.
- The basement of the Hotel Léger was the first meeting place of E Clampus Vitus.
- Gardella House (1930s). (8258 Church Street). A Designated Historic Building by the Mokelumne Hill Community Historical Trust. This Spanish Eclectic/Mission Revival style was constructed in the 1930s by John Gardella. The industrial metal sash windows are original to the design of the home. John Gardella, son of Charles (Carlo) Gardella, was the Calaveras County Coroner from the mid-1930s to mid 1950s
- Home of Edith Irvine photographer/school teacher posthumously famous for photographing San Francisco after the 1906 earthquake and fire. The photos were discovered in the basement of the home by her nephew after her death in 1949. She also photographed Calaveras Big Trees, Yosemite, Mokelumne Hill, and the installation of the hydroelectric equipment on the Mokelumene River.

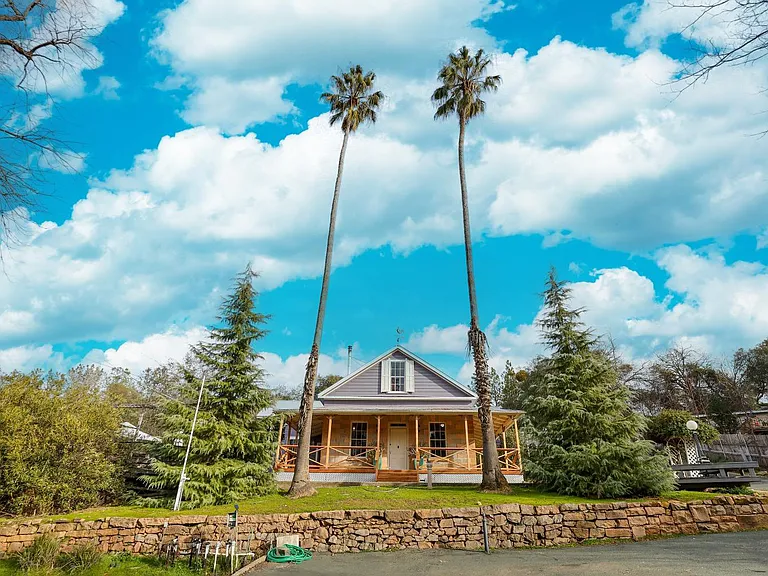
Home built in 1852

== Geography ==
According to the United States Census Bureau, the CDP has a total area of 3.1 square miles (8.0 km^{2}), over 99% of it land.

=== Climate ===
According to the Köppen Climate Classification system, Mokelumne Hill has a hot-summer Mediterranean climate, abbreviated "Csa" on climate maps.

== Demographics ==
Historical population
Census	Pop.	Note	%±
2000	774		—
2010	646		−16.5%
2020	691		7.0%
U.S. Decennial Census; 1860–1870 1880-1890; 1900 1910 1920; 1930 1940 1950; 1960 1970 1980; 1990 2000 2010

Mokelumne Hill first appeared as a census designated place in the 2000 U.S. census.

=== 2020 census ===
Mokelumne Hill CDP, California – Racial and ethnic composition Note: the US Census treats Hispanic/Latino as an ethnic category. This table excludes Latinos from the racial categories and assigns them to a separate category. Hispanics/Latinos may be of any race.
Race / Ethnicity (NH = Non-Hispanic)	Pop 2000	Pop 2010	Pop 2020	% 2000	% 2010	% 2020
White alone (NH)	708	546	557	91.47%	84.52%	80.61%
Black or African American alone (NH)	0	3	0	0.00%	0.46%	0.00%
Native American or Alaska Native alone (NH)	12	11	4	1.55%	1.70%	0.58%
Asian alone (NH)	3	2	4	0.39%	0.31%	0.58%
Native Hawaiian or Pacific Islander alone (NH)	0	0	2	0.00%	0.00%	0.29%
Other race alone (NH)	0	0	1	0.00%	0.00%	0.14%
Mixed race or Multiracial (NH)	18	18	38	2.33%	2.79%	5.50%
Hispanic or Latino (any race)	33	66	85	4.26%	10.22%	12.30%
Total	774	646	691	100.00%	100.00%	100.00%

The 2020 United States census reported that Mokelumne Hill had a population of 691. The population density was 224.4 inhabitants per square mile (86.6/km^{2}). The racial makeup of Mokelumne Hill was 583 (84.4%) White, 0 (0.0%) African American, 11 (1.6%) Native American, 4 (0.6%) Asian, 3 (0.4%) Pacific Islander, 12 (1.7%) from other races, and 78 (11.3%) from two or more races. Hispanic or Latino of any race were 85 persons (12.3%).

The whole population lived in households. There were 326 households, out of which 54 (16.6%) had children under the age of 18 living in them, 142 (43.6%) were married-couple households, 24 (7.4%) were cohabiting couple households, 71 (21.8%) had a female householder with no partner present, and 89 (27.3%) had a male householder with no partner present. 121 households (37.1%) were one person, and 73 (22.4%) were one person aged 65 or older. The average household size was 2.12. There were 180 families (55.2% of all households).

The age distribution was 122 people (17.7%) under the age of 18, 39 people (5.6%) aged 18 to 24, 139 people (20.1%) aged 25 to 44, 165 people (23.9%) aged 45 to 64, and 226 people (32.7%) who were 65 years of age or older. The median age was 53.3 years. For every 100 females, there were 113.3 males.

There were 368 housing units at an average density of 119.5 units per square mile (46.1 units/km^{2}), of which 326 (88.6%) were occupied. Of these, 223 (68.4%) were owner-occupied, and 103 (31.6%) were occupied by renters.

== Politics ==
In the state legislature, Mokelumne Hill is in the 4th senatorial district, represented by Republican Marie Alvarado-Gil, and the 8th Assembly district, represented by Republican David Tangipa. Federally, Mokelumne Hill is in California's 5th congressional district, represented by Republican Tom McClintock.
