= West Point, California =

West Point
- Unincorporated Community; Census Designated Place
- Location in Calaveras County and the state of California

- Location in the United States
- Coordinates: 38°23′57″N 120°31′39″W
- Country: United States
- State: California
- County: Calaveras

Area
  - Total: 2.964 sq mi (7.678 km^{2})
  - Land: 2.964 sq mi (7.678 km^{2})
  - Water: 0 sq mi (0 km^{2}) 0%
- Elevation: 2,769 ft (844 m)

Population (2020)
  - Total: 688
  - Density: 232/sq mi (89.6/km^{2})
- Time zone: UTC-8 (Pacific (PST))
  - Summer (DST): UTC-7 (PDT)
- ZIP code: 95255
- Area code: 209
- FIPS code: 06-84732
- GNIS feature IDs: 255226, 2409563

California Historical Landmark
- Reference no.: 268

West Point (formerly, Indian Gulch and Westpoint) is a census-designated place (CDP) in Calaveras County, California, United States. As of the 2020 United States census, West Point's population was 688, up from 674 as of the 2010 census. The town is registered as California Historical Landmark #268. There is an annual West Point Lumberjack Days festival in the community.

== History ==
West Point was originally the name of a camp established here by scout Kit Carson, who was searching for a pass over the Sierra Nevada. The town was originally named Indian Gulch when founded in 1852; the name was changed to West Point in 1854. The first post office was opened in 1856, the name changed to Westpoint in 1895 and changed back to West Point in 1947.

One emigrant road forked by Big Meadow – its north branch came directly to West Point, which was a thriving trading post prior to the gold discovery. Author Bret Harte lived there for a time.

== Geography ==
According to the United States Census Bureau, the CDP has a total area of 3.0 square miles (7.8 km^{2}), all land.

=== Climate ===
According to the Köppen Climate Classification system, West Point has a warm-summer Mediterranean climate, abbreviated "Csa" on climate maps.

== Demographics ==
Historical population
Census	Pop.	Note	%±
2000	746		—
2010	674		−9.7%
2020	688		2.1%
U.S. Decennial Census; 1860–1870 1880-1890; 1900 1910 1920; 1930 1940 1950; 1960 1970 1980; 1990 2000 2010

West Point first appeared as a census designated place in the 2000 U.S. census.

=== 2020 census ===
West Point CDP, California – Racial and ethnic composition Note: the US Census treats Hispanic/Latino as an ethnic category. This table excludes Latinos from the racial categories and assigns them to a separate category. Hispanics/Latinos may be of any race.
Race / Ethnicity (NH = Non-Hispanic)	Pop 2000	Pop 2010	Pop 2020	% 2000	% 2010	% 2020
White alone (NH)	581	537	499	77.88%	79.67%	72.53%
Black or African American alone (NH)	9	0	1	1.21%	0.00%	0.15%
Native American or Alaska Native alone (NH)	51	40	55	6.84%	5.93%	7.99%
Asian alone (NH)	5	2	5	0.67%	0.30%	0.73%
Native Hawaiian or Pacific Islander alone (NH)	0	7	1	0.00%	1.04%	0.15%
Other race alone (NH)	4	4	3	0.54%	0.59%	0.44%
Mixed race or Multiracial (NH)	36	17	43	4.83%	2.52%	6.25%
Hispanic or Latino (any race)	60	67	81	8.04%	9.94%	11.77%
Total	746	674	688	100.00%	100.00%	100.00%

=== 2010 ===
The 2010 United States census reported that West Point had a population of 674. The population density was 181.2 inhabitants per square mile (70.0/km^{2}). The racial makeup of West Point was 563 (83.5%) White, 0 (0.0%) African American, 43 (6.4%) Native American, 2 (0.3%) Asian, 7 (1.0%) Pacific Islander, 29 (4.3%) from other races, and 30 (4.5%) from two or more races. Hispanic or Latino of any race were 67 persons (9.9%).

The Census reported that 673 people (99.9% of the population) lived in households, 1 (0.1%) lived in non-institutionalized group quarters, and 0 (0%) were institutionalized.

There were 308 households, out of which 70 (22.7%) had children under the age of 18 living in them, 125 (40.6%) were opposite-sex married couples living together, 39 (12.7%) had a female householder with no husband present, 18 (5.8%) had a male householder with no wife present. There were 18 (5.8%) unmarried opposite-sex partnerships, and 0 (0%) same-sex married couples or partnerships. 109 households (35.4%) were made up of individuals, and 48 (15.6%) had someone living alone who was 65 years of age or older. The average household size was 2.19. There were 182 families (59.1% of all households); the average family size was 2.81.

The population was spread out, with 133 people (19.7%) under the age of 18, 36 people (5.3%) aged 18 to 24, 119 people (17.7%) aged 25 to 44, 223 people (33.1%) aged 45 to 64, and 163 people (24.2%) who were 65 years of age or older. The median age was 50.0 years. For every 100 females, there were 94.2 males. For every 100 females age 18 and over, there were 93.9 males.

There were 378 housing units at an average density of 101.6 per square mile (39.2/km^{2}), of which 308 were occupied, of which 213 (69.2%) were owner-occupied, and 95 (30.8%) were occupied by renters. The homeowner vacancy rate was 2.3%; the rental vacancy rate was 6.9%. 434 people (64.4% of the population) lived in owner-occupied housing units and 239 people (35.5%) lived in rental housing units.

=== 2000 ===
As of the census of 2000, there were 746 people, 305 households, and 203 families residing in the CDP. The population density was 199.4 inhabitants per square mile (77.0/km^{2}). There were 345 housing units at an average density of 92.2 per square mile (35.6/km^{2}). The racial makeup of the CDP was 82.04% White, 1.21% Black or African American, 8.18% Native American, 0.67% Asian, 2.82% from other races, and 5.09% from two or more races. 8.04% of the population were Hispanic or Latino of any race.

There were 305 households, out of which 25.9% had children under the age of 18 living with them, 46.6% were married couples living together, 14.4% had a female householder with no husband present, and 33.4% were non-families. 26.6% of all households were made up of individuals, and 13.1% had someone living alone who was 65 years of age or older. The average household size was 2.43 and the average family size was 2.86.

In the CDP, the population was spread out, with 24.4% under the age of 18, 5.9% from 18 to 24, 20.0% from 25 to 44, 30.0% from 45 to 64, and 19.7% who were 65 years of age or older. The median age was 45 years. For every 100 females, there were 84.7 males. For every 100 over, there are 85.5 males.

The median income for a household in the CDP was $25,417, and the median income for a family was $27,794. Males had a median income of $24,028 versus $22,500 for females. The per capita income for the CDP was $11,439. About 28.2% of families and 33.9% of the population were below the poverty line, including 45.3% of those under age 18 and 15.7% of those age 65 or over.

== Politics ==
In the state legislature, West Point is in the 4th senatorial district, represented by Republican Marie Alvarado-Gil, and the 8th Assembly district, represented by Republican David Tangipa. Federally, West Point is in California's 5th congressional district, represented by Republican Tom McClintock.
