= Murphy family =

American family of settlers in California

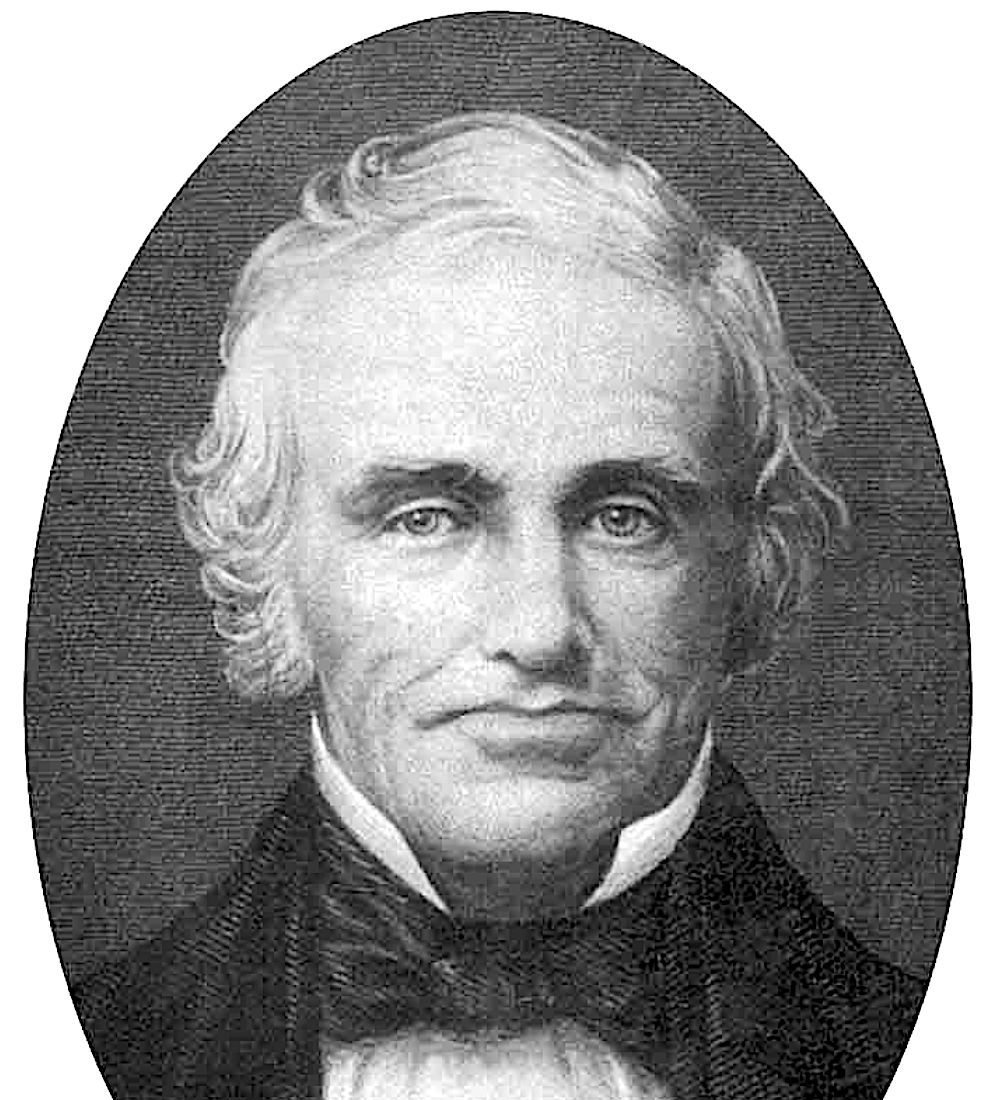
- Martin Murphy Sr. (1785–1865), the patriarch of the Murphy family of California
- Current region: California, United States
- Origin: County Wexford, Ireland

The Murphy family is an American family of Irish heritage that was heavily involved in the development of California ranches and real estate in the 19th and 20th centuries. They controlled at one time or another large swathes of California real estate, particularly in Santa Clara County, much of it derived from Mexican land grants.

== History ==
Over several generations, their holdings included Rancho Ojo del Agua de la Coche, Rancho San Francisco de las Llagas, Rancho Refugio de la Laguna Seca, Rancho Las Uvas, Rancho La Purísima Concepción, Rancho San Pedro, Santa Margarita y Las Gallinas, and Rancho Pastoria de las Borregas, totaling well over 100,000 acres.

Five of the Murphy family members served in the California legislature: Patrick W. Murphy, Bernard D. Murphy, John C. Murphy, J. E. Murphy, and R. W. Murphy. The family were the subject of Marjorie Pierce's book, The Martin Murphy Family Saga (2000); and the PBS documentary film, The Forgotten Journey (2021), produced by John Krizek.

A historical marker dedicated to the Murphy family is located in San Martin, California, and was erected by the Santa Clara County Parks Department.

Murphy family

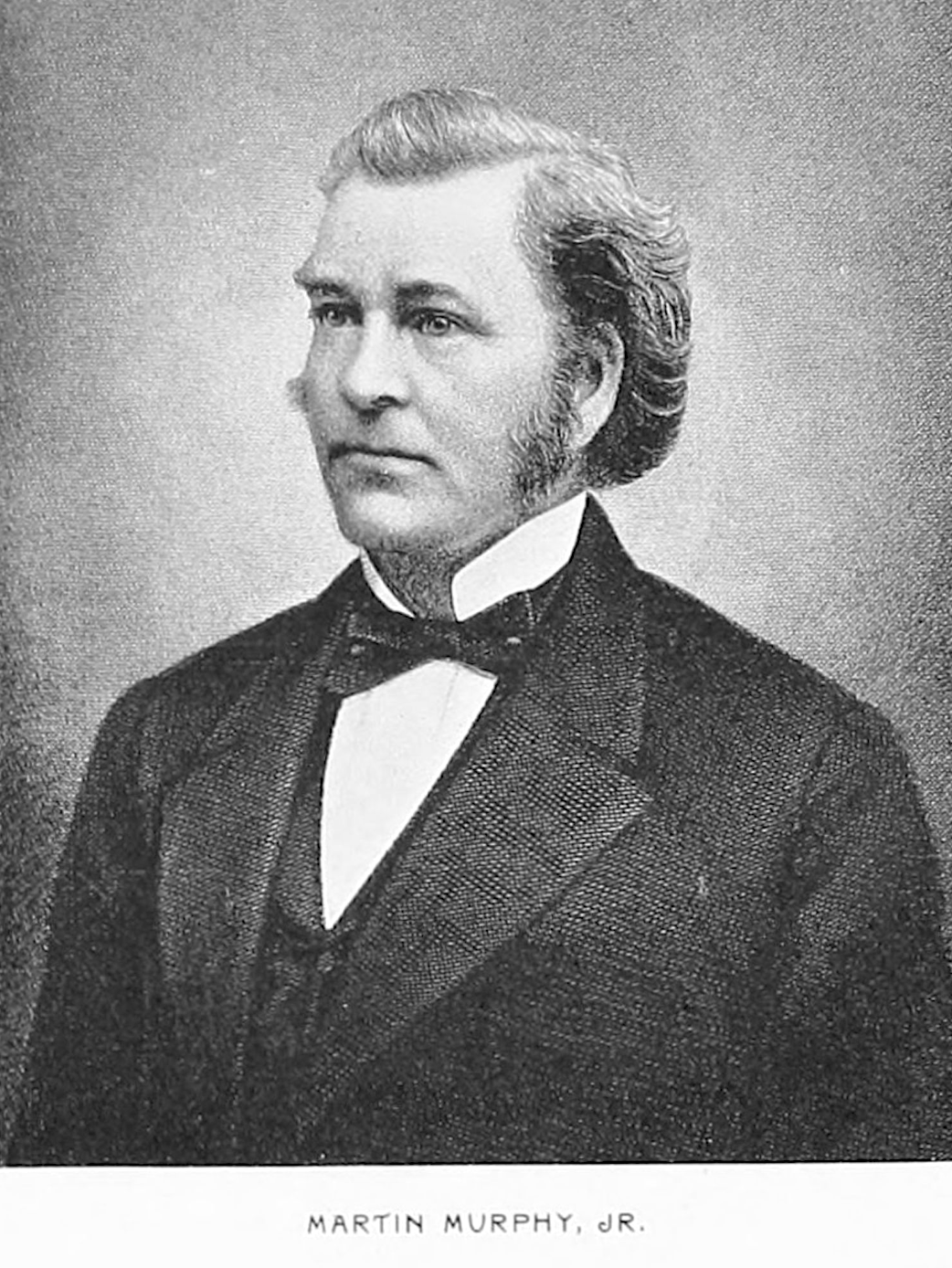
Martin Murphy Jr.

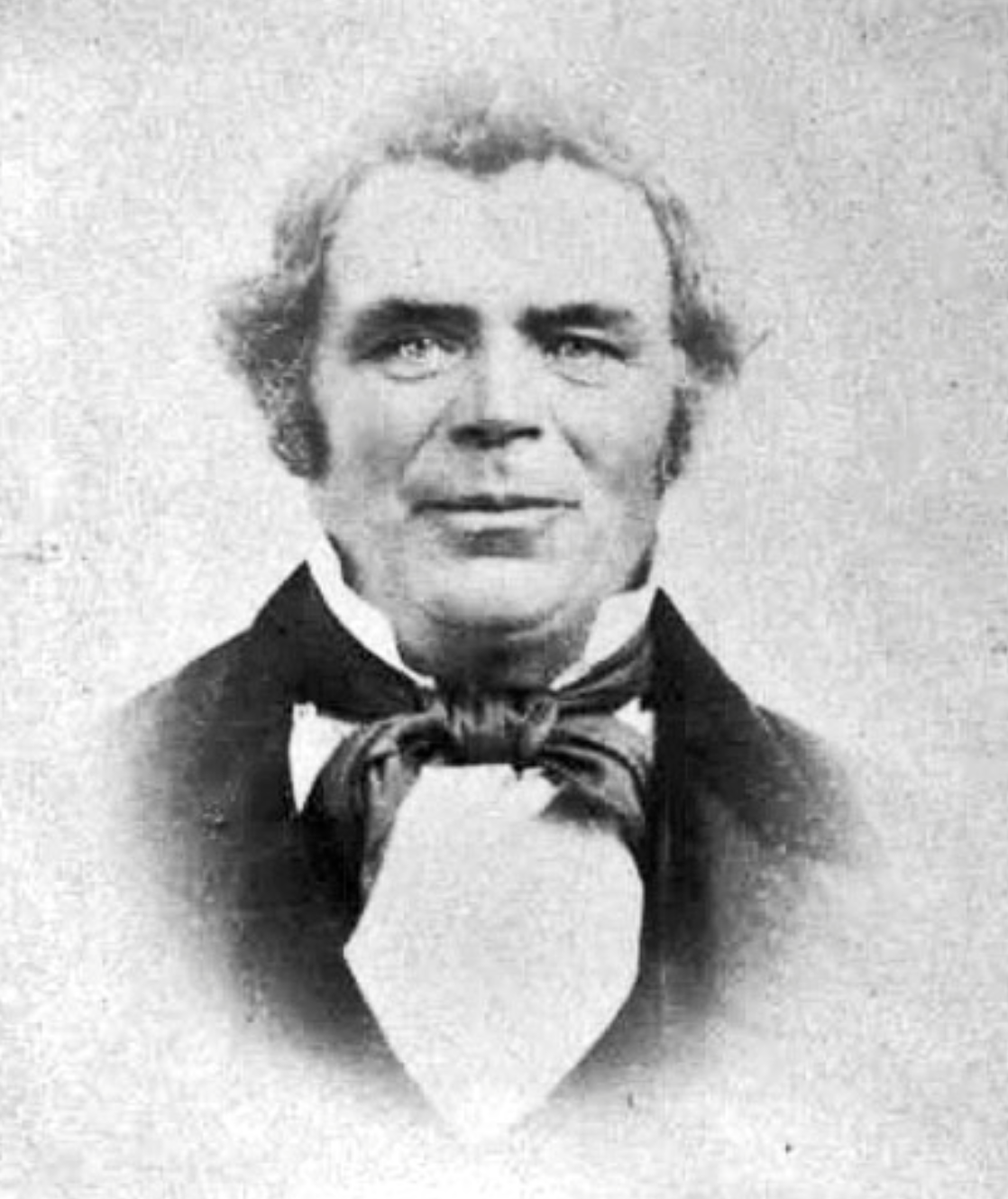
James Murphy

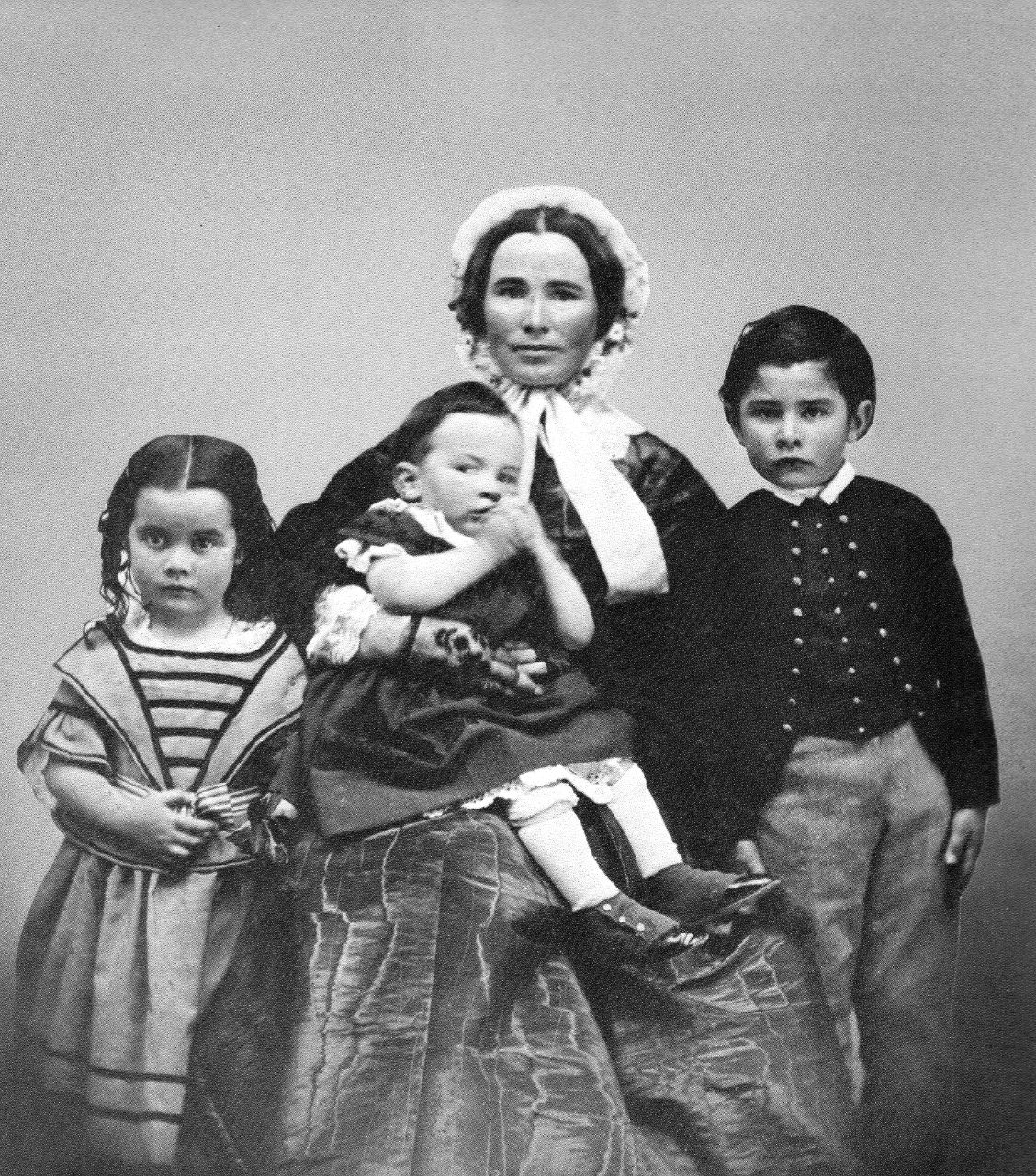
Helen Murphy Weber with her children

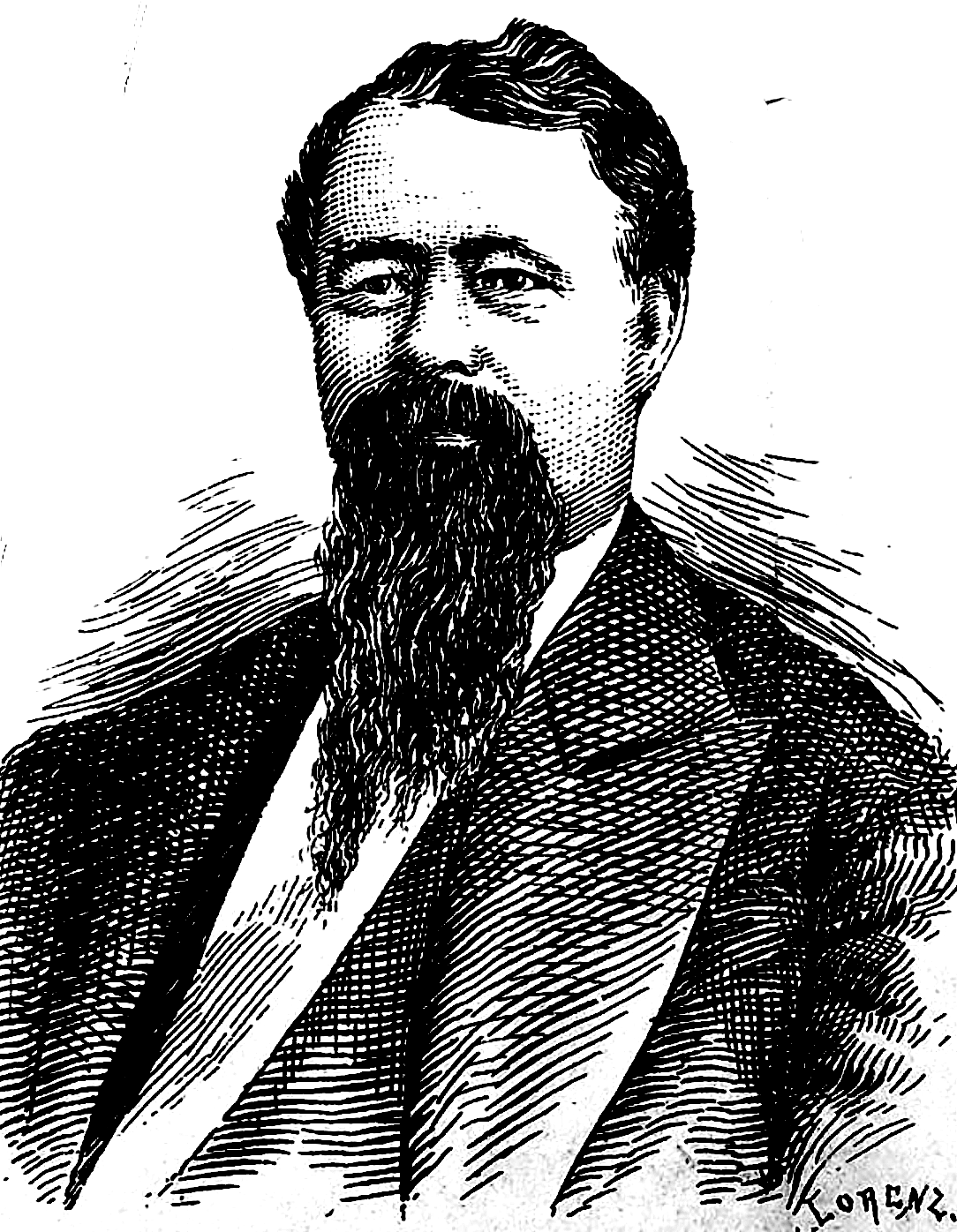
John Marion Murphy

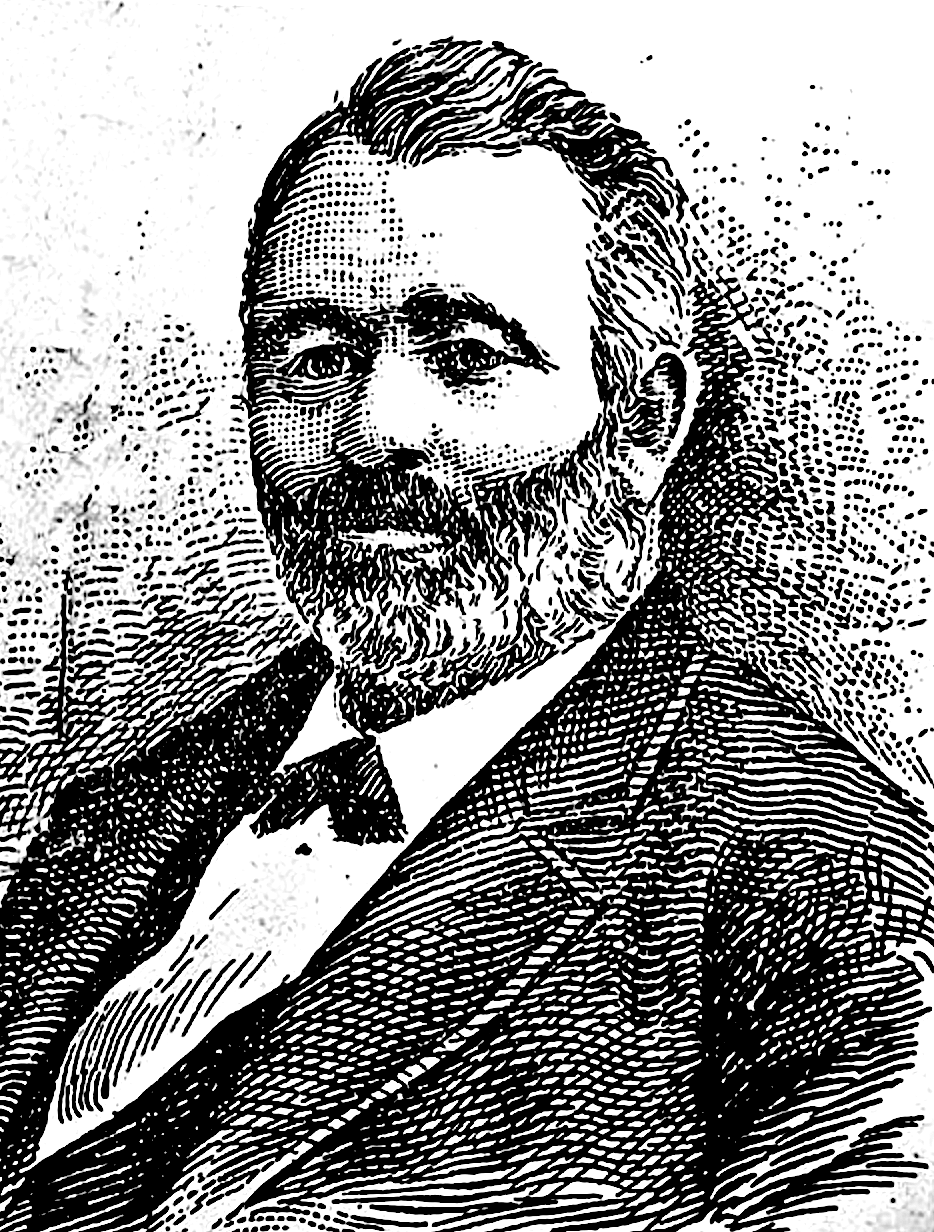
Daniel Martin Murphy
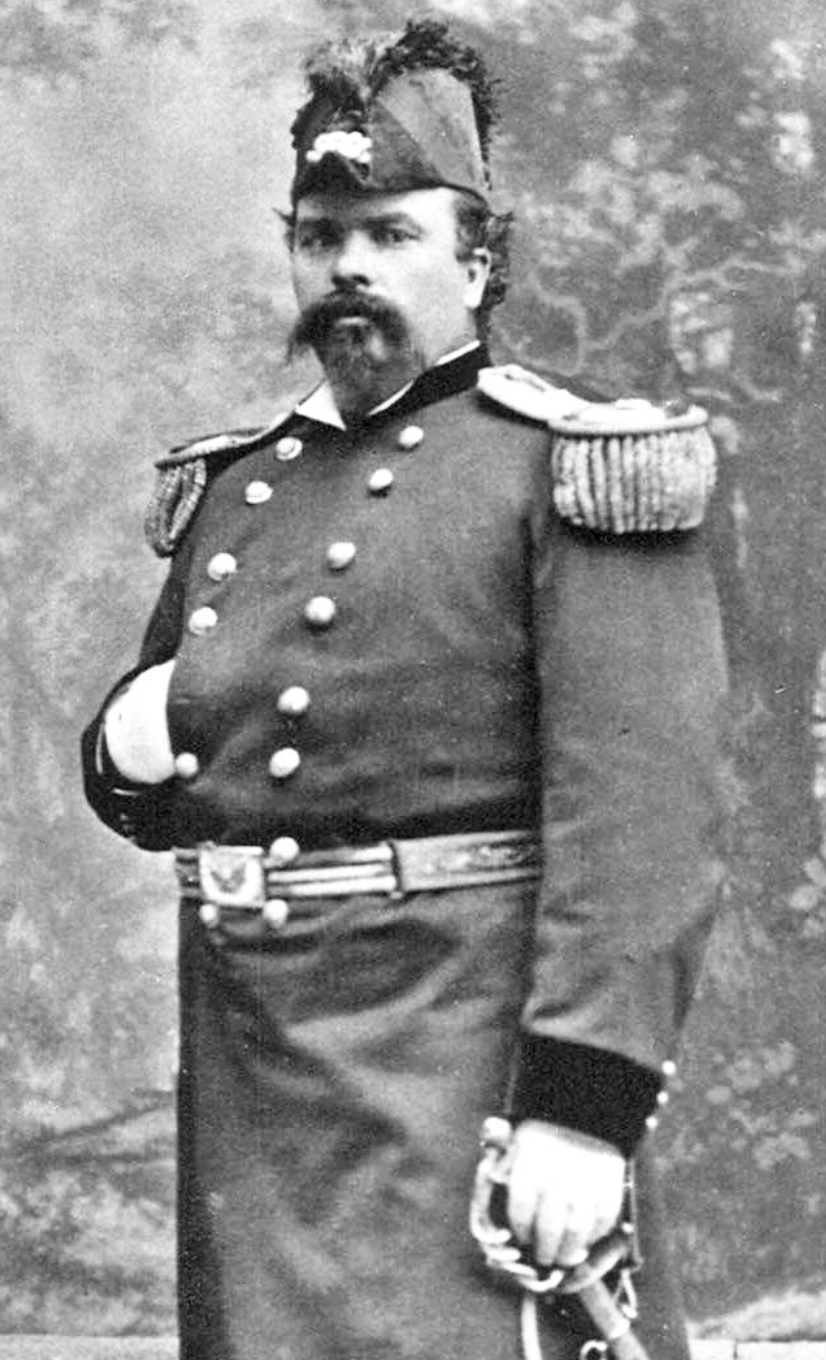
Patrick W. Murphy

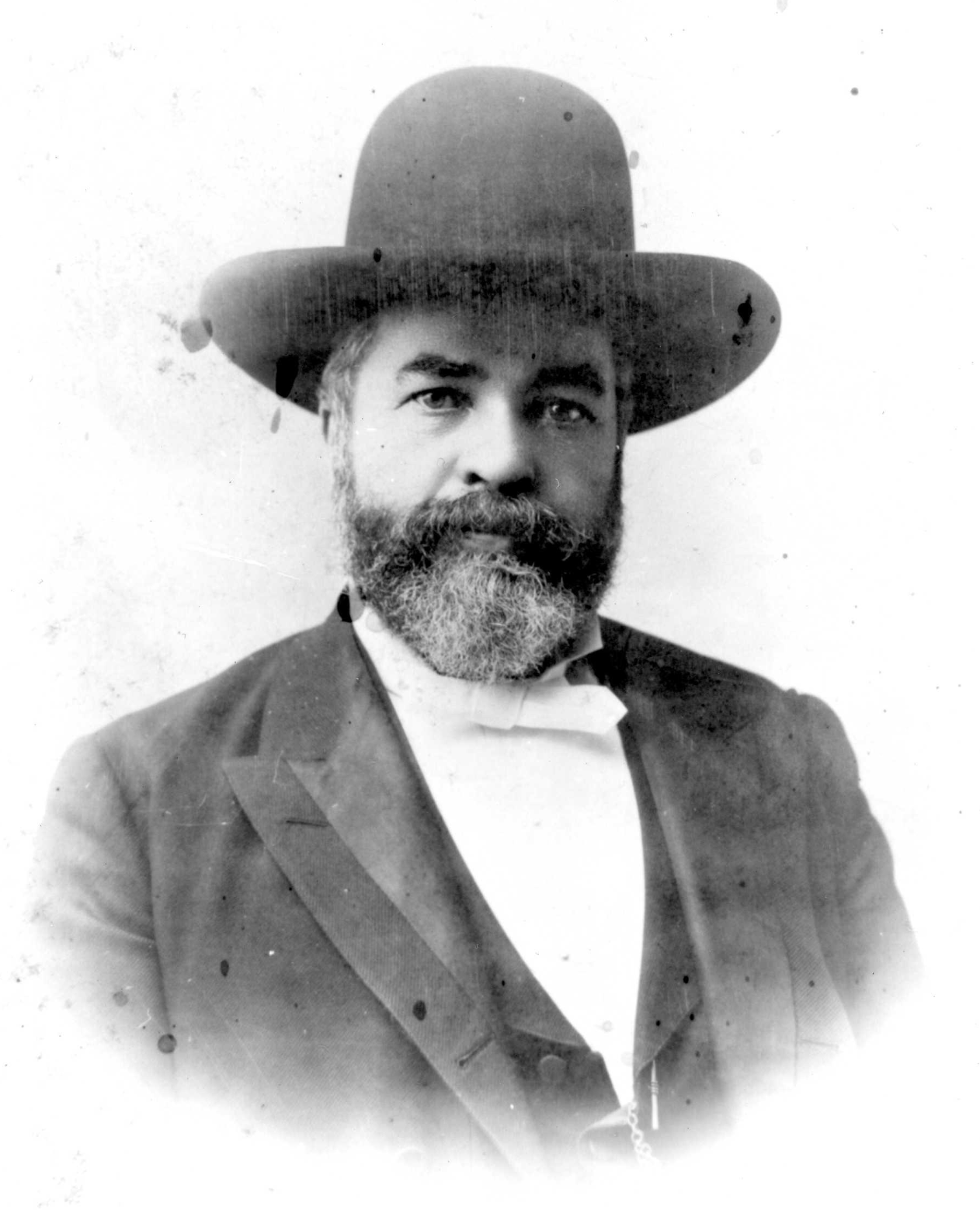
Bernard D. Murphy

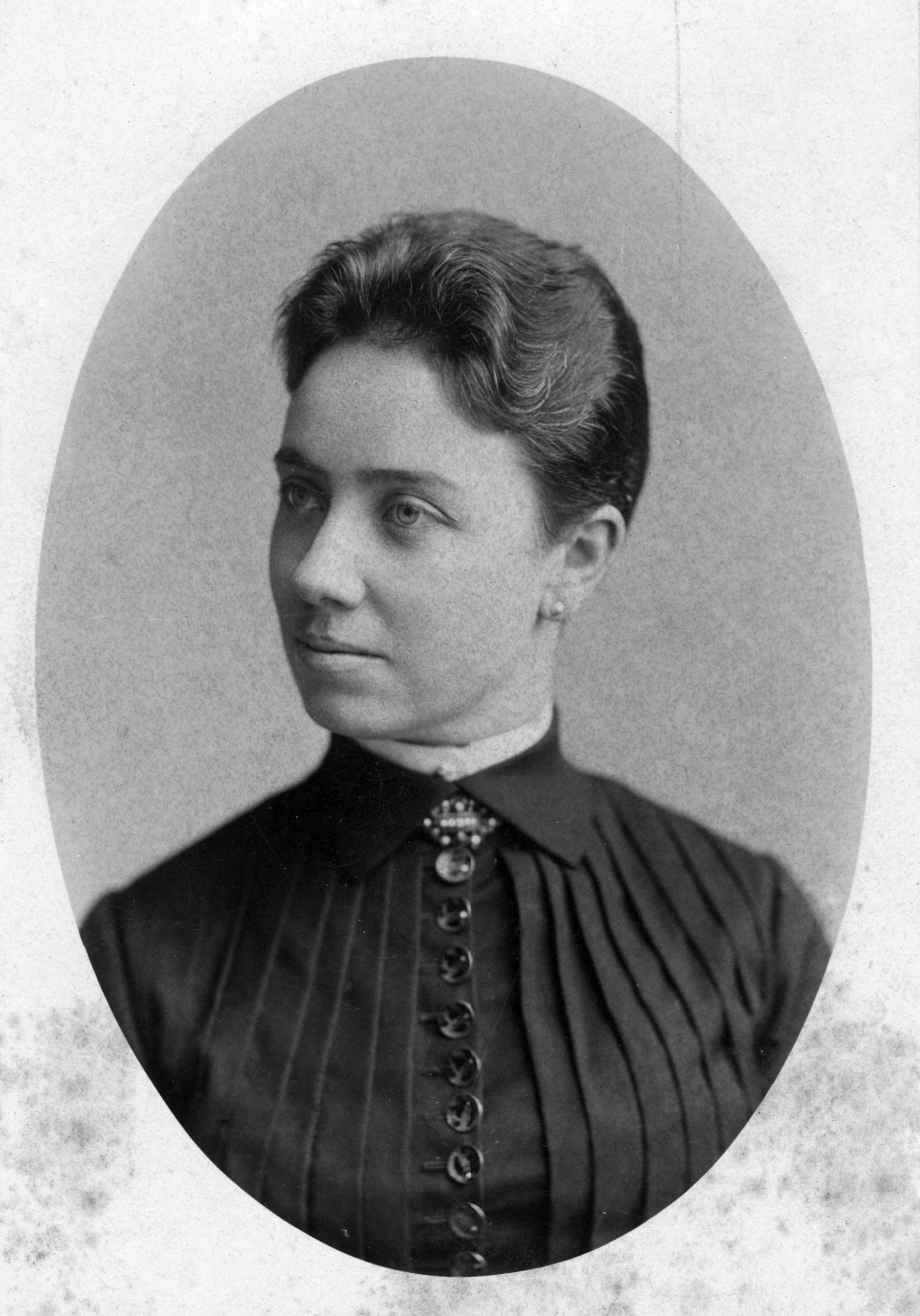
Ann Kell Colombet

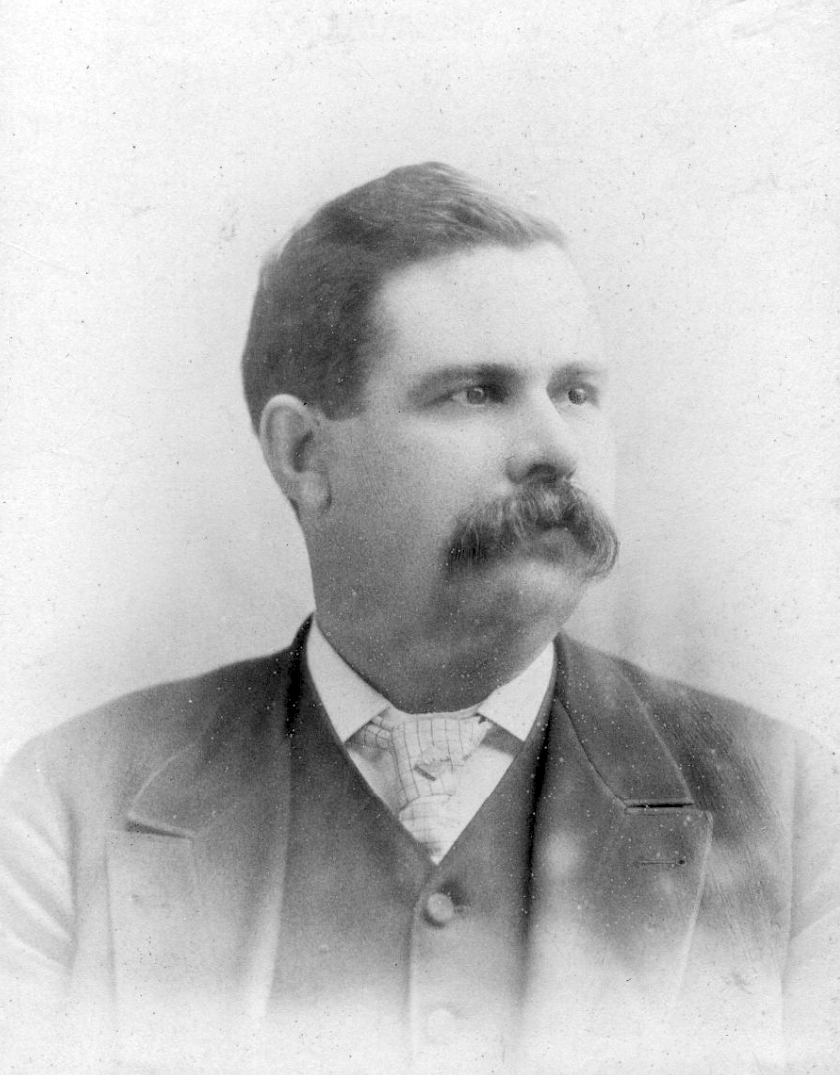
Charles M. Weber II

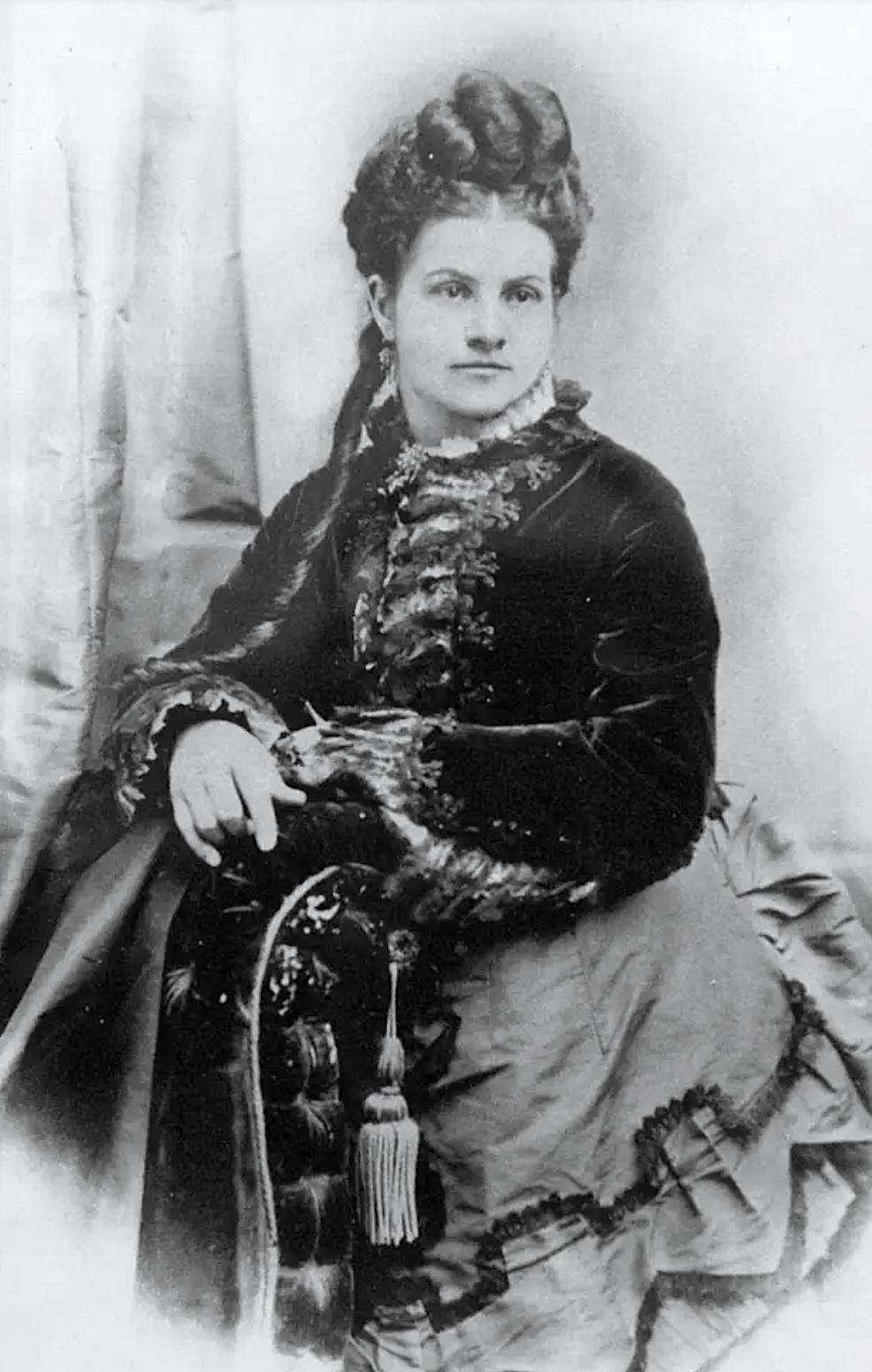
Elizabeth Yuba Murphy Taaffe

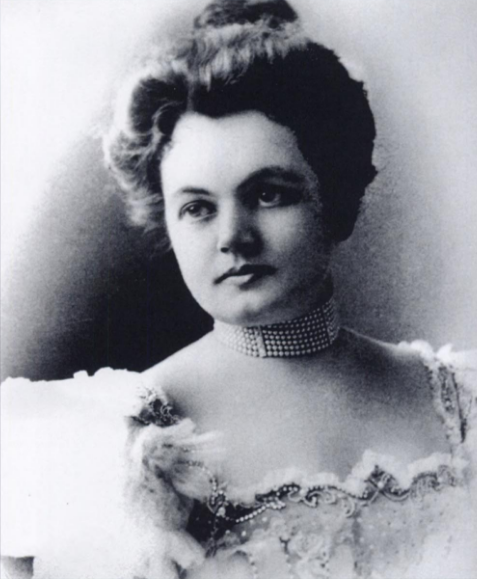
Diana Helen Murphy Hill

== Murphy genealogy ==
Martin Murphy Sr. (1785–1865) born in County Wexford, Ireland, emigrated in 1820 to Quebec Province, Lower Canada (now Canada); m. Mary Foley [9 children]; settled in Rancho Ojo del Agua de la Coche in Santa Clara County (including what is now known as San Martin, California)

- Martin Murphy Jr. (1807–1884) born in County Wexford, Ireland, emigrated in 1820 to Quebec Province, Lower Canada (now Canada); married Mary Bulger in 1830 [11 children]; settled in Rancho Pastoria de las Borregas in Santa Clara County (now known as Sunnyvale, California); his former residence is the Martin Murphy House, which was recreated to form a museum
  - Patrick W. Murphy (1837–1901; the child of Martin Murphy Jr.) born in Quebec, Lower Canada (now Canada); married Mary Catherine O'Brien [2 children]; was a member of the California State Assembly, and served as a California State Senator.
  - Bernard D. Murphy (1841–1911; the child of Martin Murphy Jr.) born in Quebec, Lower Canada (now Canada); married Anna Lucy McGeoghegan [6 children]; was a lawyer, businessman and politician; served one term as a California State Senator, and multiple terms as the Mayor of San Jose, California
  - Elizabeth Yuba Murphy (1844–1875; the child of Martin Murphy Jr.), married William Post Taaffe (1842–1869); the family was early settlers in Los Altos, California (formerly Rancho La Purísima Concepción)
- James Murphy (1809–1888), married Anna Martin; established a large farm called "Ringwood Farm" in San Jose, California near Milpitas
- Margaret Murphy (1811–1881), married Thomas B. Kell Jr. (1804–1878) an English-born settler; they had an early wheat farm in San Jose, California, near Milpitas
  - Martin D. Kell (1840–1902; son of Margaret Murphy), was a Democrat that served in many political and civic roles in Santa Clara County, including on the Santa Clara County Board of Supervisors.
- Johanna Murphy (1813–1899), married to Patrick Fitzgerald (1797–1849); ranchers and landowners in Gilroy, California
- Mary Murphy (1815–1882), married James S. Miller (1812–1890) an Irish-born settler in San Rafael, California; and one of the earliest settlers in Marin County at Rancho San Pedro, Santa Margarita y Las Gallinas
  - William J. Miller (1836–1916, child of Mary Murphy), born in Canada, he was a California state legislator, and acquired part of Rancho Nicasio in California from Benjamin Buckelew, as well as other land in the Nicasio area
  - Bernard Thomas Miller (1855–1927, child of Mary Murphy), born in Marin County, California, served as a Marin County Supervisor, and was a large land holder in the Nicasio area of Marin County.
- Bernard Murphy (1818–1853), married Catherine O'Toole; they settled at Rancho Las Uvas; he died from an explosion on the Jenny Lind traveling from Alviso, California to San Francisco, California. He traveled with his nephew Thomas J. Kell (1829–1853) when they both died.
- Helen Murphy (1822–1895), married Bavarian-born businessman Carl David Maria Weber (1814–1881); an early settler in Stockton, California
  - Charles M. Weber II (1851–1912; child of Helen Murphy) married Grace May Sinnott
    - Charles M. Weber III (1893–1987; the child of Carl Maria Weber II), served in the California State Assembly
- John Marion Murphy (1824–1892) born in Frampton, Quebec, Lower Canada (now Canada); married Virginia Elizabeth Blackenstoe Reed [9 children]; established a trading post and started a mining town called Murphys, California; served as the Santa Clara County Sheriff, and County Recorder, as well as Mayor of San Jose
- Daniel Martin Murphy (1826–1882) born in Frampton, Quebec, Lower Canada (now Canada); married Maria Fisher Ceseña in 1851 [6 children]; established a trading post and started a mining town called Murphys, California; settled at Rancho San Francisco de las Llagas (Burnett Township); one mile south of present-day Morgan Hill, California
  - Diana Helen Murphy (1869–1937; child of Daniel Martin Murphy), married Hiram Morgan Hill; she inherited the Santa Clara County ranch land after her father died, and co-founded the city of Morgan Hill, California
Murphy family residences

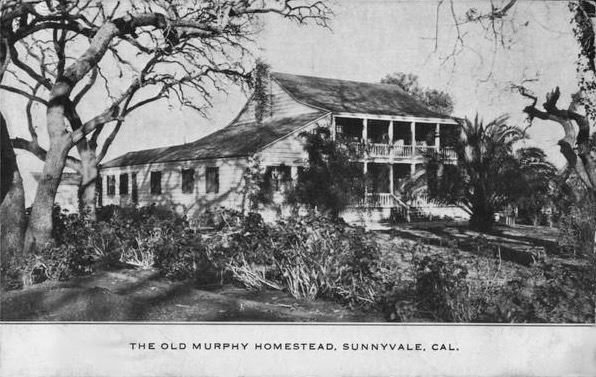
Bay View in Sunnyvale, California, residence of Martin Murphy Jr.

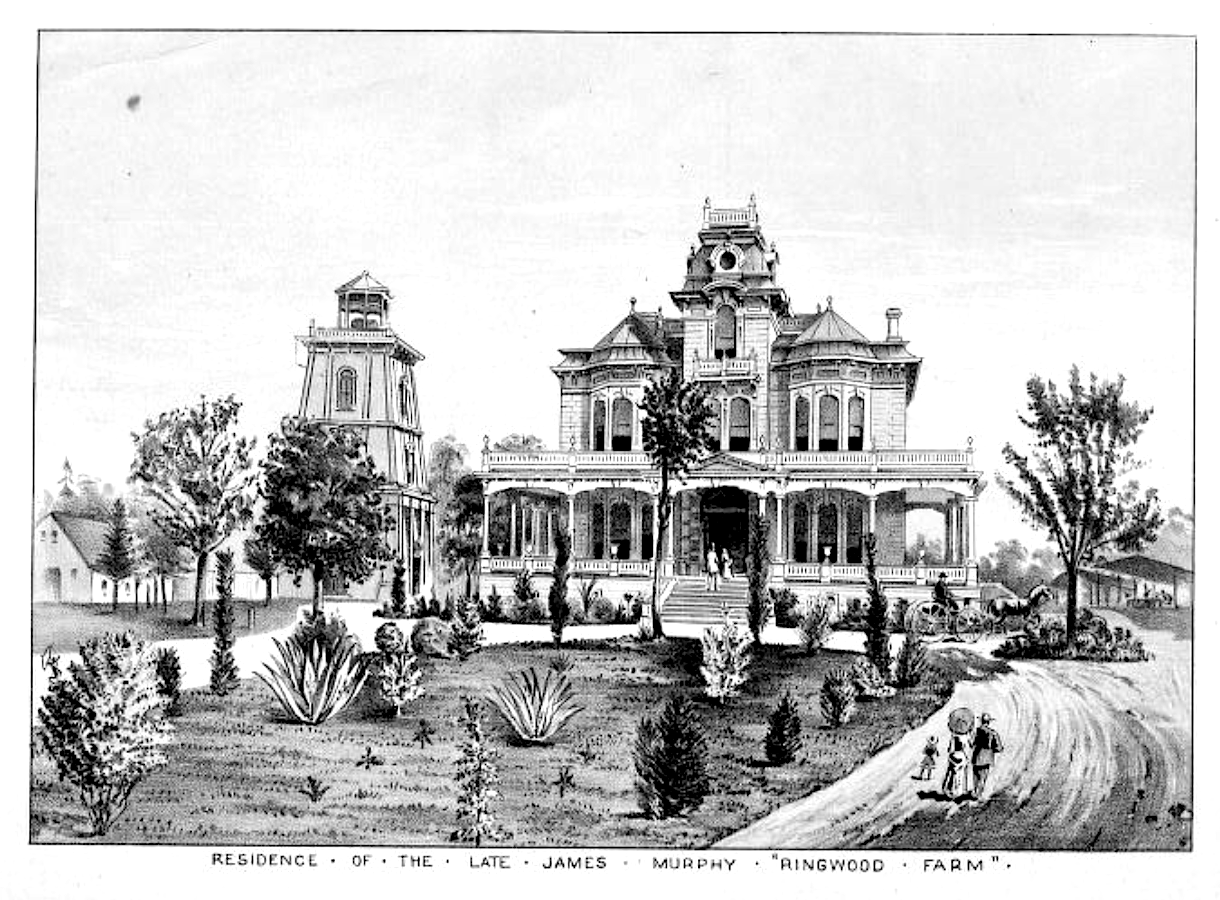
Ringwood Farm in San Jose, California, residence of James Murphy

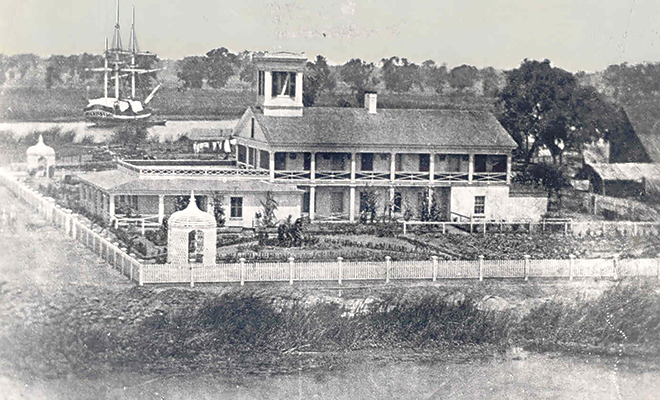
Weber Point Home in Stockton, California, residence of Helen Murphy Weber

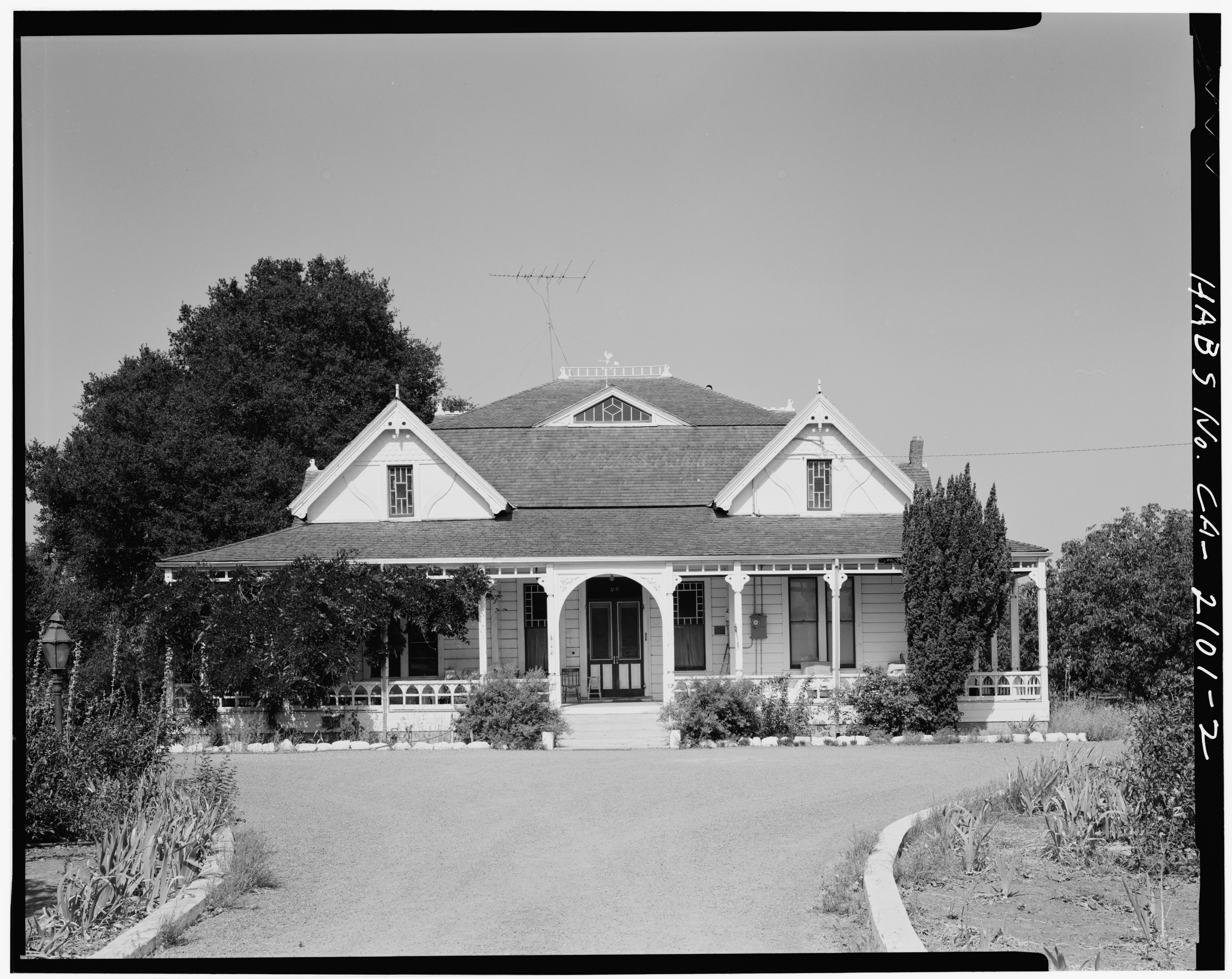
Villa Mira Monte in Morgan Hill, California, residence of Diana Helen Murphy Hill (daughter of Daniel Martin Murphy) and Hiram Morgan Hill

== Members ==
- Martin Murphy Sr.
  - Martin Murphy Jr.
    - Ellen Murphy
    - Patrick W. Murphy
      - Henry F. Murphy
    - Martin Joseph Murphy
    - Mary Murphy
    - Bernard D. Murphy
      - Mary Genevieve Murphy Wright
      - Evelyn A. Murphy
      - Martin J. Murphy
      - Elizabeth Yuba Murphy Derby
      - Bernard D. Murphy
      - Gertrude Julia Murphy
      - Patrick W. M. Murphy
      - Helena Daniel Murphy Sanders
    - Elizabeth Yuba Murphy Taaffe
    - Mary Ann Murphy Carroll
    - Ellen Genevieve Murphy Arques
    - James Thomas Murphy
    - James Murphy
  - James Murphy
    - Martin Murphy
    - Mary Frances Murphy Machado
    - Ellen Independence Murphy
    - Martin Daniel Murphy
    - Helen Elizabeth Murphy
    - William Bernard Murphy
    - Elizabeth Murphy Bull
    - Julia Murphy
    - Helen Murphy
    - Daniel James Murphy
  - Margaret Murphy Kell
    - William Kell
    - Thomas James Kell
    - Martin Kell
    - Ann Kell Colombet
    - James Kell
    - Mary Kell
    - Mary Ann Kell
    - Martin Daniel Kell
    - John James Kell
    - Mary Ellen Kell Carroll
    - Thomas Bernard Kell
  - Johanna Murphy Fitzgerald
    - Ellen Fitzgerald
    - James Fitzgerald
    - James Fitzgerald
    - Mary Fitzgerald Kane
    - Ann Fitzgerald
    - Marcella Fitzgerald
    - John S. Fitzgerald
  - Mary Murphy Miller
    - William J. Miller
    - Catherine Miller Keys
    - Mary Annie Miller Ross
    - Ellen Miller
    - Martin Van Buren Miller
    - Julia Miller
    - Ellen Independence Miller
    - Teresa Sophia Miller
    - Jane Frances Miller
    - Bernard Thomas Miller
    - Fannie Miller
    - Josephine Louise Miller Kirk
    - Tessie S. Miller
  - Bernard Murphy
    - Martin John Charles Murphy
  - Helen Murphy Weber
    - Charles M. Weber II
      - Helen May Weber Kennedy
      - Charles M. Weber III
    - Julia Helen Weber
    - Thomas Jefferson Weber
  - John Marion Murphy
    - Mollie Mary Murphy McAran
    - Lloyd Martin Murphy
    - Mattie H. Murphy
    - John Marion Murphy II
    - Virginia R. Murphy DeGreayer
    - Julia Ada Murphy Howes
    - Daniel J. Reed Murphy
    - Annie Mabel Murphy
    - Thaddeus Stanley Murphy
  - Daniel Martin Murphy
    - Mary L. Murphy Chapman
    - Daniel Martin Murphy II
    - Julia Murphy
    - Diana Helen Murphy Hill

== See also ==
- Stephens–Townsend–Murphy Party
- San Martin, California
- Murphys, California
- Murphy's Corral
- Burnett Township
- Dixie Schoolhouse
