= Elizabeth Murphy Taaffe =

American settler in Los Altos, California (1844–1875)

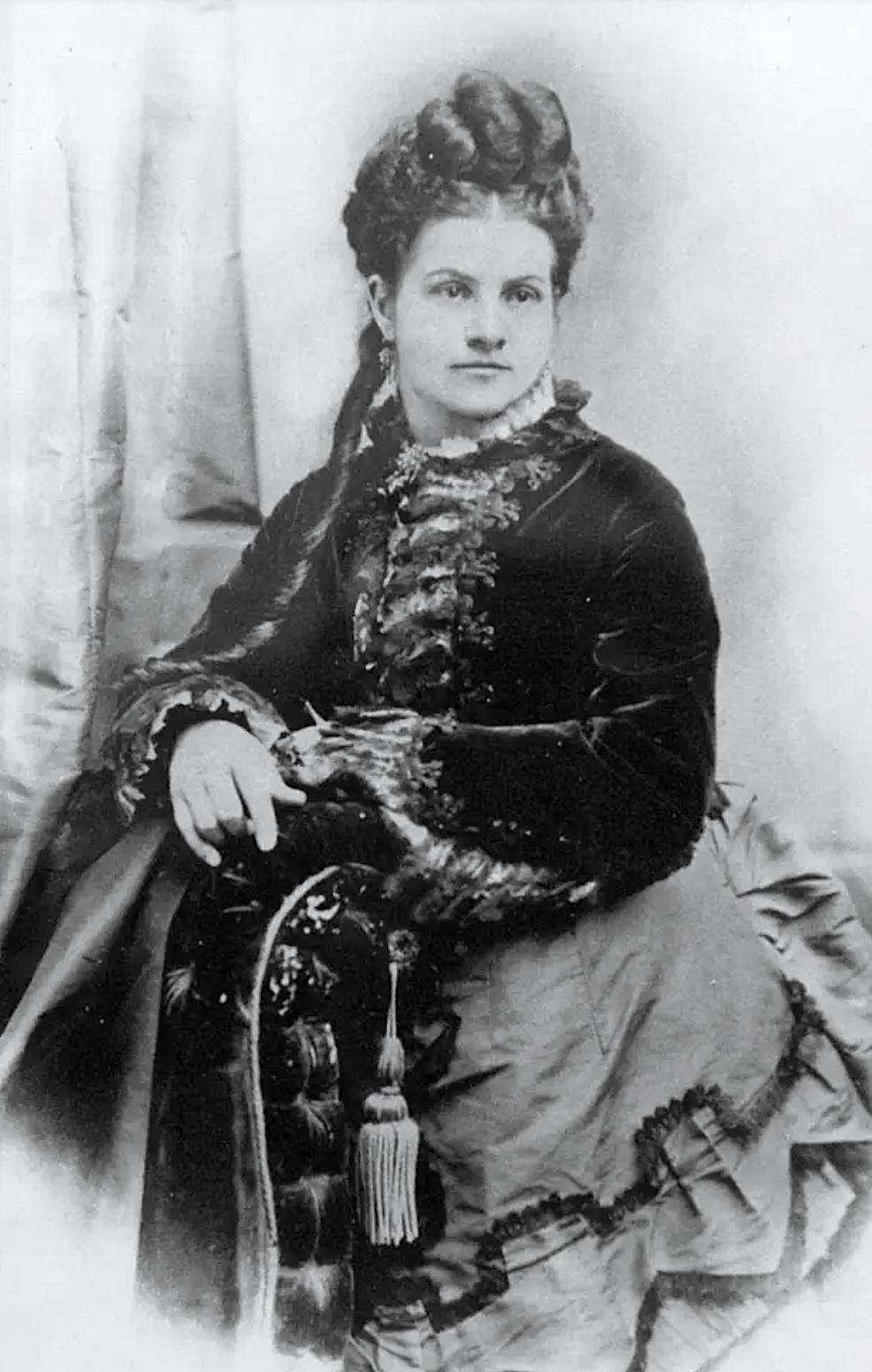
- Born: Elizabeth Yuba Murphy; December 1, 1844; Placer County, California, U.S.
- Died: May 18, 1875 (aged 30); Sunnyvale, California, U.S.
- Resting place: Santa Clara Mission Cemetery, Santa Clara, California, U.S.
- Spouse: William Post Taaffe (m. 1863–1869; his death)
- Children: 4
- Father: Martin Murphy Jr.
- Relatives: Patrick W. Murphy (sibling), Bernard D. Murphy (sibling), Martin Murphy Sr. (grandfather), John Marion Murphy (uncle), Daniel Martin Murphy (uncle)

Elizabeth "Lizzie" Murphy Taaffe (née Elizabeth Yuba Murphy; 1844–1875) was an American rancher and early settler in Santa Clara County, California. She is the first child born of English-speaking parents in the State of California.

== Family, and life ==
Elizabeth Yuba Murphy was born on December 1, 1844, in Placer County, California. She was a middle child born to Martin Murphy Jr. and his wife Mary Bulger Murphy, and was from the Irish Murphy family. She was born during the Stephens–Townsend–Murphy Party migration, and was the first child born of English-speaking parents in California.

When Murphy married San Francisco merchant William Post Taaffe in 1863, her father gave them 2,800 acres (1,100 ha) of his own ranch land, in what is now Los Altos Hills, California. They named the land Taaffe Ranch (it was located where Foothill College is now). The Taffee family had four children, and seven generations of the family have remained in Los Altos Hills.
