= Patrick W. Murphy =

Canadian-born American politician (1837–1901)

Patrick Washington Murphy
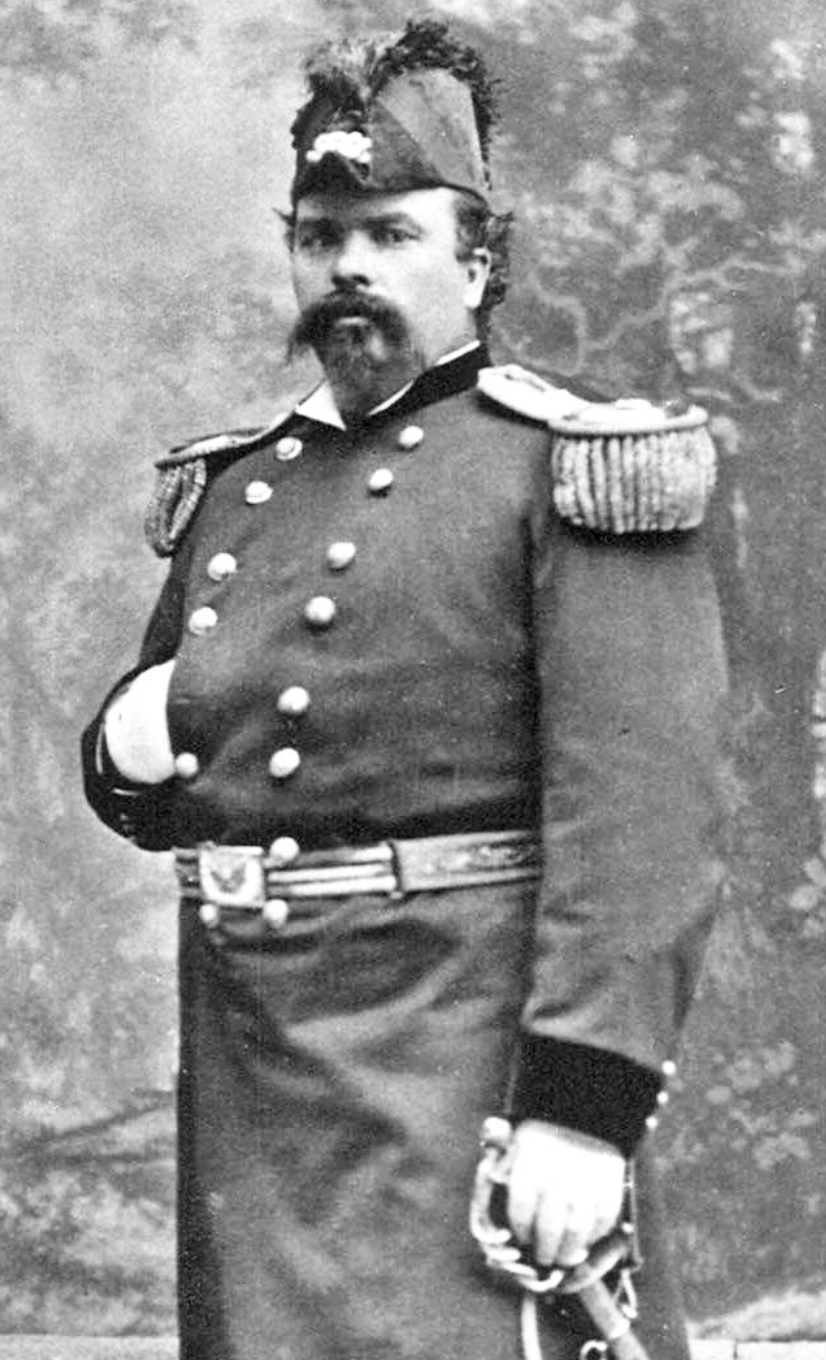

California State Senate, 3rd District
- In office 1865–1866
- Preceded by: Juan Y. Cot

California State Senate, 3rd District
- In office 1868–1869
- Succeeded by: Romualdo Pacheco

California State Senate, 3rd District
- In office 1877–1881
- Preceded by: William J. Graves
- Succeeded by: Warren Chase

California State Assembly, 3rd District
- In office 1881–1883

Personal details
- Born: September 17, 1837 Quebec, Lower Canada (now Canada)
- Died: November 1, 1901 (aged 64) San Francisco, California, U.S.
- Resting place: Santa Clara Mission Cemetery, Santa Clara, California, U.S.
- Party: Democratic
- Spouse: Mary Catherine O'Brien (m. 1870–1875; her death)
- Relations: Martin Murphy Jr. (father), Bernard D. Murphy (brother), Elizabeth Yuba Murphy (sibling), Martin Murphy Sr. (grandfather), John Marion Murphy (uncle), Daniel Martin Murphy (uncle)
- Education: Santa Clara College
- Occupation: Politician, businessman, rancher

Patrick Washington Murphy (September 17, 1837 – November 1, 1901), also known as P. W. Murphy, was a Canadian-born American politician and rancher. He was the founder of Santa Margarita, California. Murphy was a Democrat representing Ventura, Santa Barbara, and San Luis Obispo Counties; and served in the California State Senate; and was a member of the California State Assembly. He is from the Murphy family who were on the first wagon train to cross the Sierra Nevada, they were early settlers in California, and the founders of early Santa Clara Valley. Murphy was nicknamed the "Black Prince" due to his complexion.

== Early life ==
Patrick Washington Murphy was born on September 17, 1837, in Quebec, Lower Canada (now Canada), to parents Mary Bulger and Martin Murphy Jr. His father was born in County Wexford, Ireland; their family migrated seeking religious freedom as Catholics. He was one of eleven children, and his brother Bernard D. Murphy was also a politician who served in the same legislative house concurrently.

=== Migration ===
In 1840, the Murphy family moved to Atchison County, Missouri to a settlement called Irish Grove.

On May 6, 1844, the family started a wagon train from Missouri to California; it was made up of the Stephenson family, Townsend family and the Murphy family, called the Stephens–Townsend–Murphy Party. It was the first wagon train to cross the Sierra Nevada in 1844, and the journey took nine months to California.

== Career ==
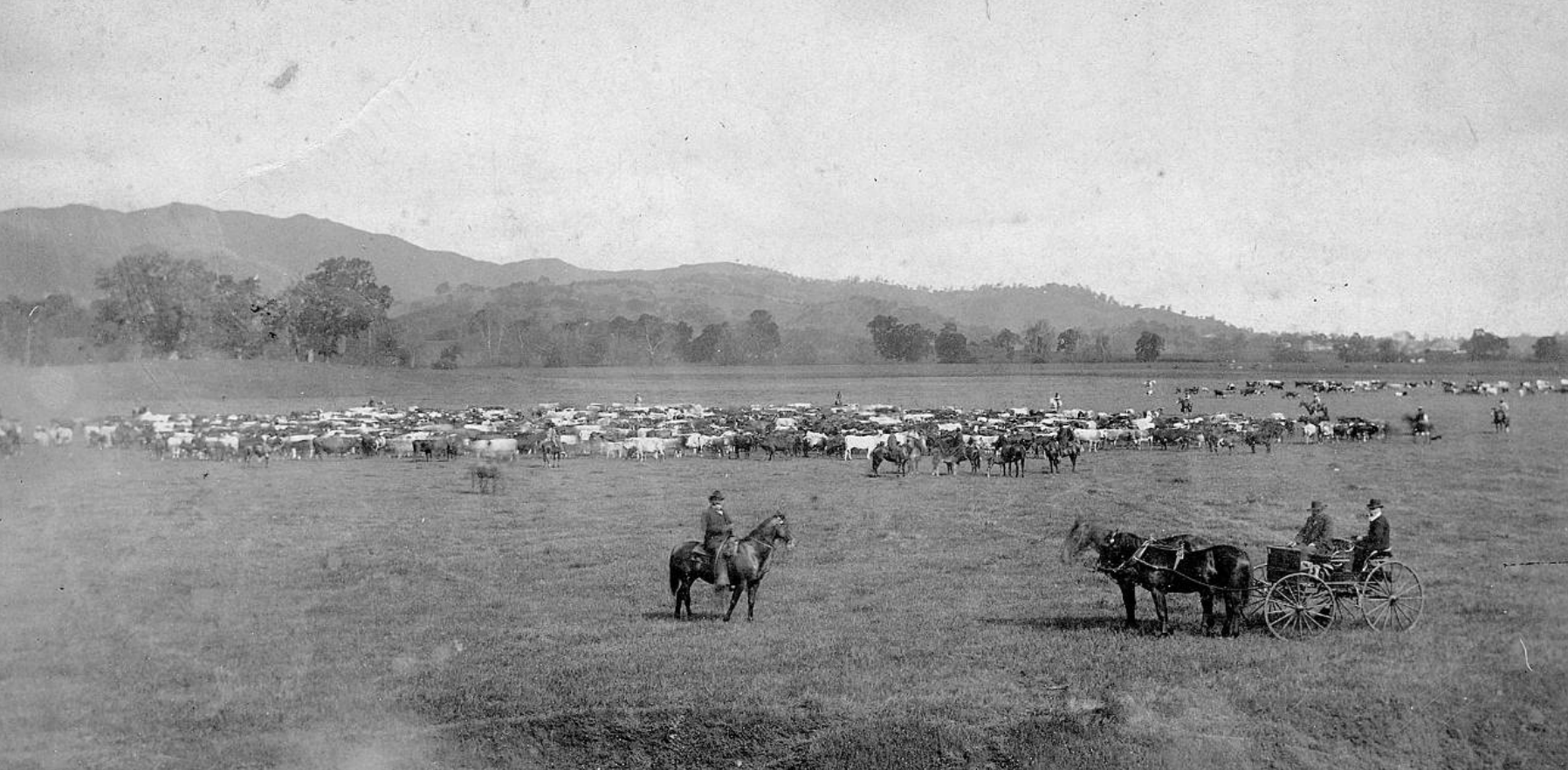
Patrick W. Murphy Ranch (1882), Santa Margarita, California

Murphy graduated from Santa Clara College (now Santa Clara University).

In the 1860s, his father bought 9,000 acres (3,600 ha) of land from Joaquín Estrada to form a cattle ranch in what is now known as Santa Margarita, California (formerly Rancho Santa Margarita). This ranch was run by his son Patrick. This grew to a ranch of 61,000 acres (247 km^{2}) (part of Santa Margarita de Cortona Asistencia, Rancho Atascadero and Rancho Asuncion), with Rancho Santa Margarita serving as headquarters. In 1876, Murphy bought an additional 9,000 acres (36 km^{2}) (formerly Rancho Punta de la Concepcion).

Murphy gave the Southern Pacific Railroad the allowance to run their track through his Santa Margarita Ranch land. This decision has defined the current route of the train.

Murphy was a Democrat representing Ventura County, Santa Barbara County, and San Luis Obispo County. Murphy served in the California State Senate in 1865–1866, 1868–1869, and 1877–1881. He was a member of the California State Assembly from 1881–1883.

Governor William Irwin appointed him brigadier general of the Second Brigade of the California National Guard. He was one of the founders and directors of the San Luis Obispo Water Company and Bank of San Luis Obispo.

Murphy was known for his rancho hospitality, he hosted many gatherings and kept many of the traditions of the Californios. He was president of the San Luis Obispo Agricultural Society in 1883, and president of the Irish Land League of California.

== Death and legacy ==
Murphy died of pneumonia on November 1, 1901, at the Lick House Hotel in San Francisco.

At the time of Patrick's death the ranch was 25,000 acres (10,000 ha) in size. His ranch sold in 1904 to the Fernando (Frank) Reis family.

The family were the subject of Marjorie Pierce's book, The Martin Murphy Family Saga (2000); and the PBS documentary film, The Forgotten Journey (2021), produced by John Krizek.
