= Rancho San Francisco de las Llagas =

Mexican land grant in California

Coordinates: 37.090°N 121.610°W

Rancho San Francisco de las Llagas was a 22,283-acre (90.18 km^{2}) Mexican land grant in present-day Santa Clara County, California given in 1834 by Governor José Figueroa to Carlos Antonio Castro. The grant extended along Llagas Creek from about one mile south of present-day Morgan Hill to about one mile north of Gilroy, and included present-day San Martin.

== History ==
Carlos Antonio Castro (b.1775) was the son of Joaquin Ysidro de Castro and Maria Marina Botiller, who had come to California from Mexico with the De Anza Expedition in 1775. Carlos' brother, José Mariano Castro (1765–1828) was the grantee of Rancho Las Animas; his brother José Joaquín Castro (1768–1838) was the grantee of Rancho San Andrés; and his brother Francisco María Castro (1770 - 1831) was the grantee of Rancho San Pablo. Carlos Antonio Castro married María de Rosario García (b. 1779) in 1805. Their son Guillermo Castro was the grantee of Rancho San Lorenzo. In 1812, Carlos Castro was mayor domo of Mission Santa Cruz, and received the six square league Rancho San Francisco de las Llagas grant in 1834.

In 1848, the heirs of Carlos Castro sold Rancho San Francisco de las Llagas to Martin Murphy Sr.'s sons Daniel and Bernard. Martin Murphy had brought his family to California with the Stephens-Townsend-Murphy Party in 1844. Martin Murphy Sr. purchased Rancho Ojo del Agua de la Coche to the north of Rancho San Francisco de las Llagas in 1846.

With the cession of California to the United States following the Mexican-American War, the 1848 Treaty of Guadalupe Hidalgo provided that the land grants would be honored. As required by the Land Act of 1851, a claim for Rancho San Francisco de las Llagas was filed with the Public Land Commission in 1852, and the grant was patented to Daniel and Bernard Murphy (later joined by James and Martin J. C. Murphy) in 1868.

In 1851, Daniel Martin Murphy married Mary Fisher, daughter of neighbor William Fisher, owner of Rancho Laguna Seca. When Daniel Murphy died in 1882, his daughter Diana and son Daniel Jr. inherited the land grant. Daniel Murphy Jr. sold his land on Rancho San Francisco de las Llagas in 1892 to real estate developer Chauncey Hatch Phillips.

Bernard Murphy purchased Rancho La Polka on the east boundary of Rancho San Francisco de las Llagas and Rancho Las Uvas on the western boundary of Rancho Ojo de Agua de la Coche. Bernard Murphy married Catherine O’Toole (b. 1828). Bernard Murphy was killed in the explosion of the steamboat "Jenny Lind" en route from Alviso to San Francisco on April 11, 1853, and his wife Catherine inherited the land. In 1862, Catherine O’Toole Murphy married James Dunne of Rancho Bolsa de San Felipe who died in 1874. In 1893, a portion of Rancho San Francisco de las Llagas, also known as the Dunne Ranch, owned by Catherine Murphy Dunne, was subdivided and the settlement of Rucker was created. Catherine's daughter, Mary Phileta Dunne, married Joseph H. Rucker.
