= Bernard D. Murphy =

Canadian-born American politician (1841–1911)

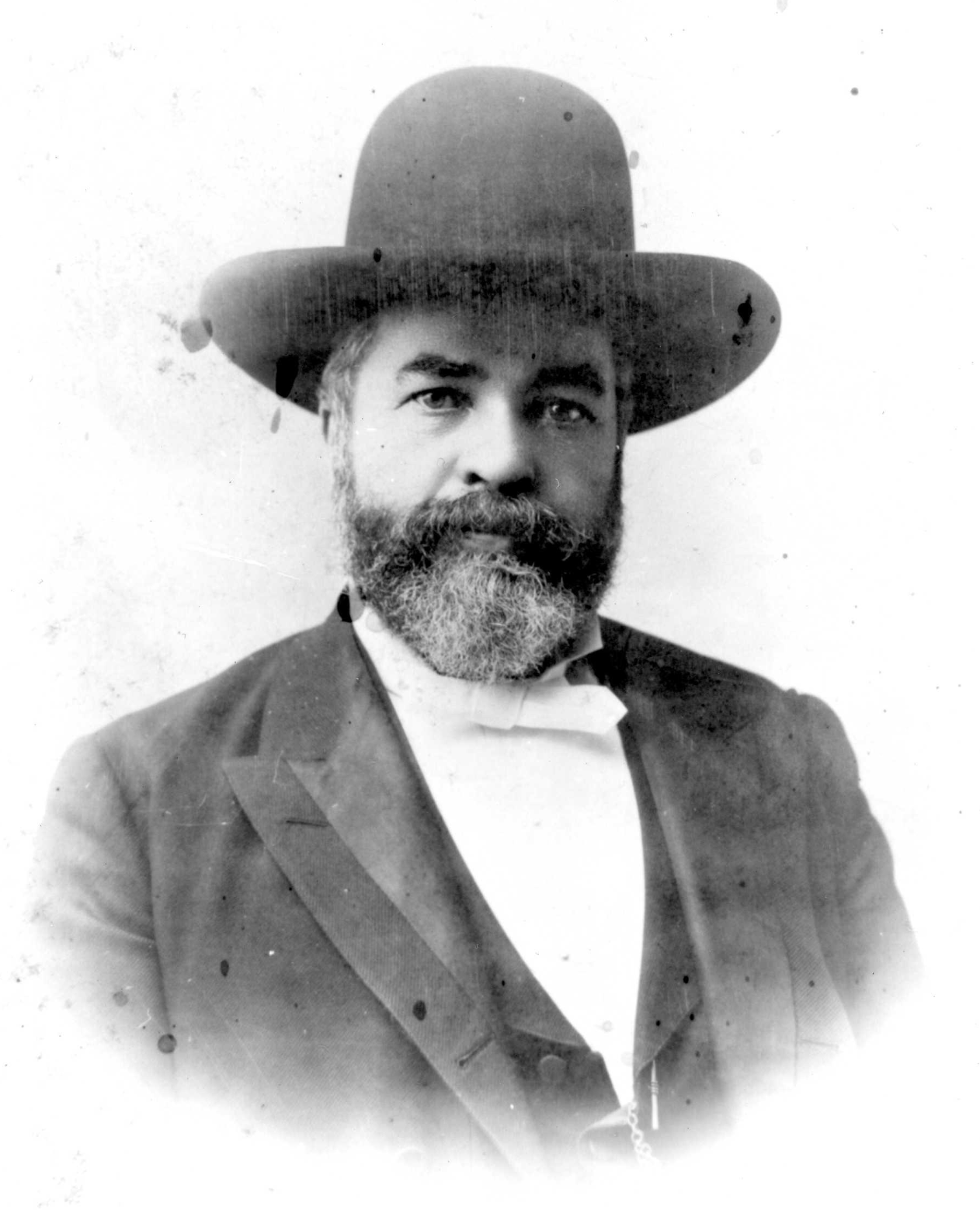

California State Assembly for Santa Clara County
- In office 1869–1871

16th Mayor of San Jose
- In office 1873–1877
- Preceded by: Adolph Pfister
- Succeeded by: George B. McKee

California State Senator for Santa Clara County
- In office 1877–1880

19th Mayor of San Jose
- In office 1880–1882
- Preceded by: Lawrence Archer
- Succeeded by: Charles J. Martin

Personal details
- Born: Bernard Daniel Murphy; March 1, 1841 Quebec, Lower Canada
- Died: December 28, 1911 (aged 70) San Francisco, California, U.S.
- Resting place: Santa Clara Mission Cemetery, Santa Clara, California, U.S.
- Party: Democratic
- Spouse: Anna Lucy McGeoghegan
- Relations: Martin Murphy Jr. (father), Patrick W. Murphy (sibling), Elizabeth Yuba Murphy (sibling), Martin Murphy Sr. (grandfather), John Marion Murphy (uncle), Daniel Martin Murphy (uncle)
- Children: 6
- Education: Santa Clara College
- Occupation: Lawyer, businessman, politician, banker, real estate investor

Bernard "Barney" Daniel Murphy (March 1, 1841 – December 28, 1911) also known as B. D. Murphy, was a Canadian-born American lawyer, businessman and politician. He was a member of the California State Assembly, a California State Senator, and the Mayor of San Jose, California for two terms. The Murphy family were early settlers in California, and founders of early Santa Clara Valley.

== Early life, family and education ==
Bernard "Barney" Daniel Murphy was born on March 1, 1841, in Quebec, Lower Canada (now Canada). His father Martin Murphy Jr. was born in Wexford, Ireland. His older brother Patrick W. Murphy was also a politician who served in the same legislative house concurrently. When Bernard was 3 years old the Murphy family crossed the Sierra Nevada into California.

They were early settlers in California, and founders of early Santa Clara Valley. In 1846, his grandfather purchased the Rancho Ojo del Agua de la Coche. At age 9, his family homestead and the Martin Murphy House was founded in what is present-day Sunnyvale, California, near Mountain View, California.

Murphy graduated with honors in 1865 from Santa Clara College (now Santa Clara University).

In 1869, he married Anna Lucy McGeoghegan, and together they had 6 children.

== Career ==
Murphy passed the California State Bar exam in 1868. He was a member of the Sainte Claire Club, and a member and vice president of the Society of California Pioneers.

Murphy was active within the Democratic Party. In 1869, he was elected to the California State Assembly, representing Santa Clara County. He was instrumental in the establishment of the San Jose Normal School (later known as San Jose State University).

He served two terms as Mayor of San Jose, starting in 1873. During his first term as mayor he donated his salary to help form the first San Jose Public Library.

On September 7, 1877, Murphy was elected as a California State Senator representing Santa Clara County. He was one of the people instrumental in the establishment of the Lick Observatory, and the road built to the site. He served on the board of trustees of the Lick Trust from 1875. This trust had been set up initially by James Lick in 1874 but he replaced the board with Murphy, Faxon Atherton, John Nightingale, and John H. Lick.

He was one of the founders of the San Luis Obispo Water Company.

== Death ==
Murphy died of heart failure on December 28, 1911, at the Hotel Imperial in San Francisco, California. He was buried at Santa Clara Mission Cemetery.

== See also ==
- Mayor of San Jose, California

Political offices
Preceded by Adolph Pfister	Mayor of San Jose; 1873–1877	Succeeded by George B. McKee
Preceded by Lawrence Archer	Mayor of San Jose; 1880–1882	Succeeded by Charles J. Martin
