= Rancho Las Uvas =

Mexican land grant in California

Coordinates: 37.120°N 121.720°W

Rancho Las Uvas was a 11,080-acre (44.8 km^{2}) Mexican land grant in present-day Santa Clara County, California given in 1842 by Governor Juan Alvarado to Lorenzo Pinedo (often spelt Pineda). The name means "ranch of the grapes" and is derived from an abundance of wild grapes (Vitis californica) along the area's main watercourses. The grant was 3 miles west of present-day Morgan Hill, and covered the hilly area drained by the Uvas Creek and Llagas Creek, and is the site of present-day Uvas Reservoir.

== History ==
Lorenzo Pinedo, arrived in California from Ecuador, the sole survivor of a shipwreck off the coast at Monterey. Lorenzo Pinedo married Maria del Carmen Berreyesa, the daughter of José de los Reyes Berreyesa, in 1839, and received the three square league grant in 1842. Lorenzo Pinedo died in 1852.

Martin Murphy Sr. had brought his family to California with the Stephens-Townsend-Murphy Party in 1844. Martin Murphy Sr. purchased Rancho Ojo del Agua de la Coche. Martin Murphy's son, Bernard Murphy, purchased Rancho La Polka on the east boundary of Rancho San Francisco de las Llagas and Rancho Las Uvas on the western boundary of Rancho Ojo de Agua de la Coche. Bernard Murphy was killed in the explosion of the steamboat Jenny Lind en route from Alviso to San Francisco on April 11, 1853.

With the cession of California to the United States following the Mexican-American War, the 1848 Treaty of Guadalupe Hidalgo provided that the land grants would be honored. As required by the Land Act of 1851, a claim for Rancho Las Uvas was filed by Bernard Murphy with the Public Land Commission in 1852, and the grant was patented to Martin J. C. Murphy (1853–1872), son of Bernard Murphy, in 1860.

== See also ==
- Ranchos of Santa Clara County, California
