= Charles M. Weber III =

American politician (1893–1987)

Member of the California State Assembly from the 11th district
- In office March 25, 1935 – January 8, 1951
- Preceded by: Dana P. Eicke
- Succeeded by: Howard Q. Parker

Personal details
- Born: October 23, 1893 San Jose, California, U.S.
- Died: April 15, 1987 (aged 93) Sacramento, California, U.S.
- Resting place: San Joaquin Catholic Cemetery, Stockton, California, U.S.
- Party: Independent (until 1936); Republican (after 1936)
- Spouse: Gertrude Perzy (m. 1954)
- Relations: Carl David Maria Weber (grandfather)
- Children: 2

Military service
- Branch/service: United States Army
- Battles/wars: World War I

Charles M. Weber III (October 23, 1893 – April 15, 1987) was an American politician, rancher, developer, and civil engineer. He served in the California State Assembly for the 11th district for multiple terms, from March 25, 1935 until January 8, 1951. During World War I he served in the United States Army. Afterwards, he developed the Weberstown Shopping Center (now Mershops Weberstown) in Stockton.

== Childhood ==
Charles M. Weber III was born on October 23, 1893, in San Jose, California, to parents Charles Maria Weber II (1851–1912) and Grace May Sinnott (1860–1897). He had an older sister, Helen Weber Kennedy (1889–1983). He was the grandson of the founder of the city of Stockton, California, Captain Carl David Maria Weber (1814–1881). His grandmother was Helen Murphy (1822–1895), and her father (his maternal great-grandfather) was Martin Murphy Sr., an early settler in California, part of the Murphy family of California, and the founder of the town of San Martin, California.

He attended Saint Mary's College of California, and Cornell University.
