= Martin Murphy Jr. =

Irish-born American settler, farmer (1807–1884)

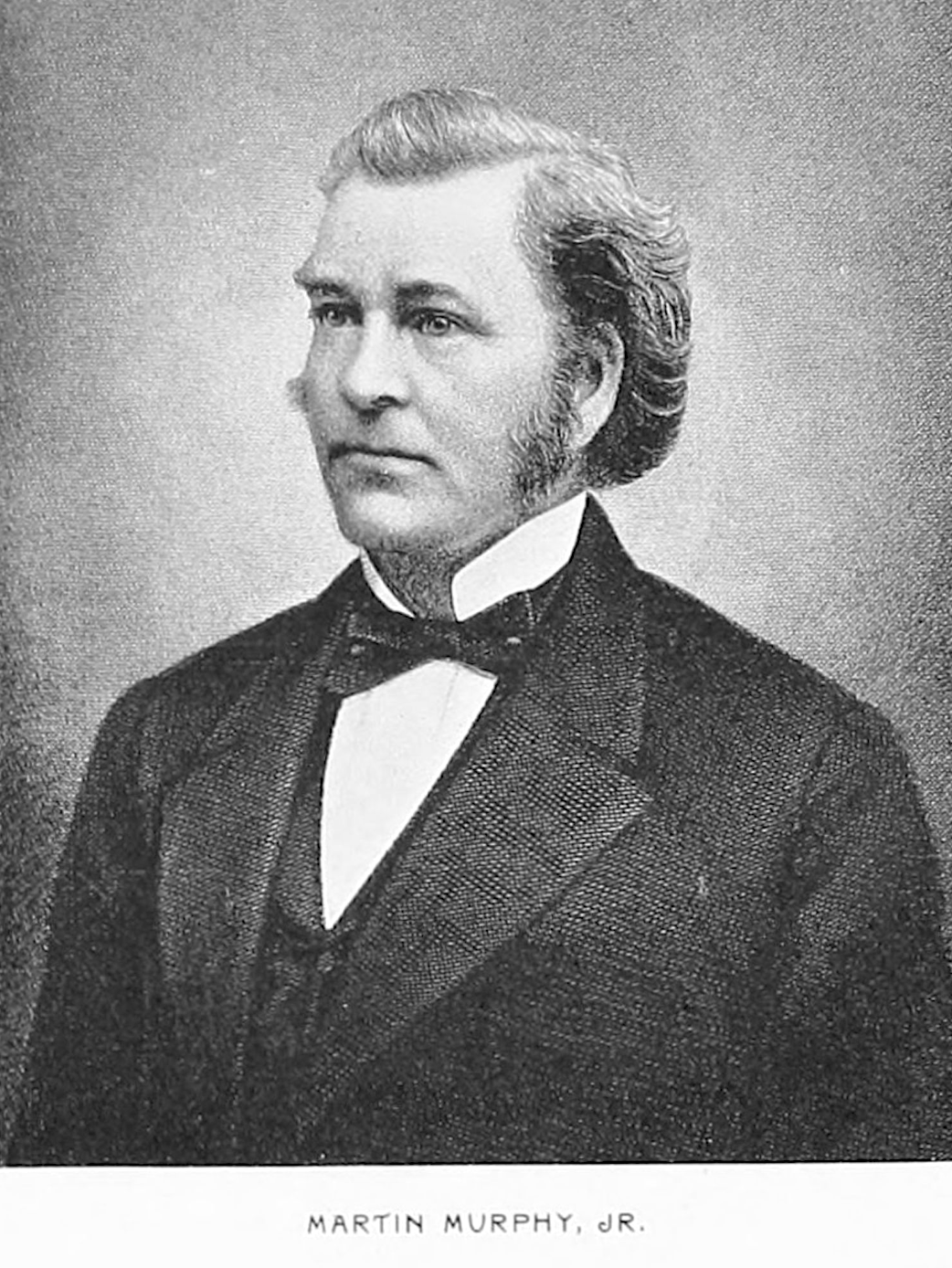
- Born: November 9, 1807; County Wexford, Ireland
- Died: October 20, 1884 (aged 76); San Jose, California, U.S. (now Sunnyvale)
- Resting place: Santa Clara Mission Cemetery, Santa Clara, California, U.S.
- Spouse: Mary Bulger (m. 1831–)
- Children: 11, including Bernard D. Murphy, Patrick W. Murphy, Elizabeth Yuba Murphy
- Father: Martin Murphy Sr.
- Relatives: John Marion Murphy (brother), Daniel Martin Murphy (brother)

Signature
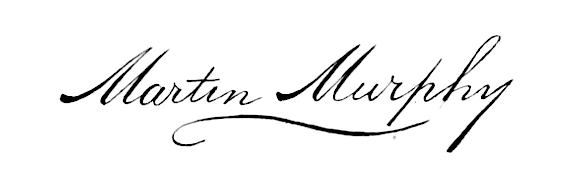

Martin Murphy Jr. (November 9, 1807 – October 20, 1884) was an Irish-born American farmer, and settler who founded Sunnyvale, California. He owned Murphy's Ranch in Elk Grove, California, which was the location of the start of the Bear Flag Revolt, and is now a historical site. His former residence is the Martin Murphy House, which was replicated and is now used as the Sunnyvale Heritage Park Museum.

He is from the Murphy family who were on the first wagon train to cross the Sierra Nevada, they were early settlers in California, and the founders of early Santa Clara Valley.

== Early life ==
Martin Murphy Jr. was born on November 9, 1807, in County Wexford, Ireland, to parents Mary Foley and Martin Murphy Sr.. He was the eldest of nine children. The family was Catholic and were persecuted by the Protestant ruling class.

== Migration ==
In 1820, the Murphy family migrated to Quebec Province, Lower Canada (now Canada), and settled in an Irish community in Frampton for the next twenty years.

He married Mary Bulger in 1831. Together they had 11 children, including Bernard D. Murphy and Patrick W. Murphy. In 1840, the Murphy family moved to Atchison County, Missouri to a settlement called Irish Grove.

On May 6, 1844, they started a wagon train from Missouri to California; it was made up of the Stephenson family, Townsend family and the Murphy family, called the Stephens–Townsend–Murphy Party. It was the first wagon train to cross the Sierra Nevada in 1844, and the journey took nine months to California.

== Life in California ==
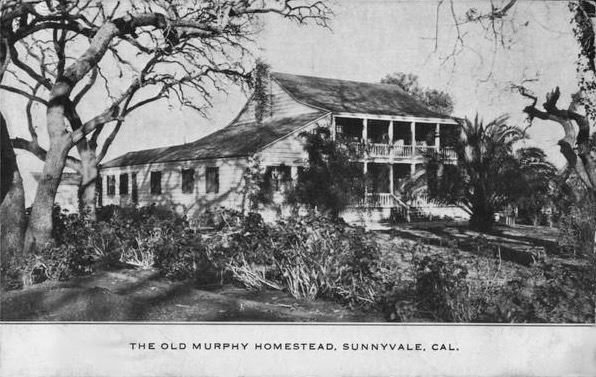
Martin Murphy House in Sunnyvale, California

He settled in what is present-day Elk Grove, California, near the Monterey Trail some 19 miles (31 km) from the settlement of New Helvetia (later called Sutter's Fort). It was there where he formed Murphy's Ranch (also known as Murphy's Corral), which was the site of the start of the Bear Flag Revolt. The former ranch is now a historical site.

In 1849, Murphy moved to the San Francisco Bay Area, at the invite of his friend and brother-in-law Carl David Maria Weber (1814–1881; also known as Carlos Maria Weber). Murphy bought land in the Santa Clara Valley from Mariano Castro in 1849. He had his home milled and pre-assembled in Bangor, Maine, and it was shipped around the Cape Horn in 1850. There were no sawmills in California at the time, so the house was re-assembled using straps and wood pegs.

During the period leading up to statehood for California in 1850, many Mexicans had problems providing their land titles, and sold their cattle to raised funds for lawyers. Murphy made a profit from hides sold for leather. He grew wheat and raised cattle on the land around his homestead. He allowed the San Francisco and San Jose Railroad (later known as Caltrain) to add a train stop on his property in 1861.

In the 1860s Murphy bought more land in California, including a 9,000 acres (3,600 ha) ranch in Santa Margarita, which was run by his son Patrick. He started diversifying his crops around this time period and started planting orchards and vines. In 1861, he also bought Rancho La Purísima Concepción in present-day Los Altos Hills, California from Juana Briones de Miranda, and he gifted this ranch to his daughter Elizabeth after her marriage in 1863.

The Murphy family helped found two schools in Santa Clara County: the Santa Clara College for Boys (later known as Santa Clara University) and Notre Dame College for Girls (later known as Notre Dame de Namur).

== Death and legacy ==
Murphy died on October 20, 1884, in his home in San Jose, California (now Sunnyvale).

At the time of his death it is estimated that Murphy owned 1,000,000 acres (400,000 ha) in California. His house in Sunnyvale remained in the Murphy family until 1953, but parcels of their land were sold starting in 1900 to real estate developer Walter Crossman. The land around the train stop developed into a town, which eventually became Sunnyvale, and incorporated as a city in 1912.

Murphy had built the Murphy Building (1862) at 36 South Market Street in San Jose, California; which had been listed on the National Register of Historic Places in Santa Clara County on April 28, 1975, and was demolished on January 12, 1976.

The site of his former house in Sunnyvale was listed a California Historical Landmark in 1960; and it contains a historical marker erected by California State Park Commission, the City of Sunnyvale and the Sunnyvale Historical Society.

The Murphy family were the subject of Marjorie Pierce's book, The Martin Murphy Family Saga (2000); and the PBS documentary film, The Forgotten Journey (2021), produced by John Krizek.
