= Carl David Maria Weber =

Palatine-born American settler in California (1814–1881)

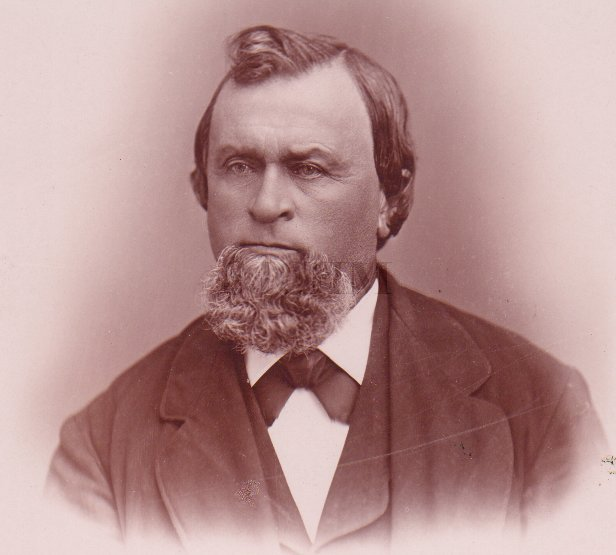
- Born: Karl David Weber; February 18, 1814; Steinwenden, Palatinate, Kingdom of Bavaria (now Rhineland-Palatinate, Germany)
- Died: May 4, 1881 (aged 67); Stockton, California, U.S.
- Resting place: San Joaquin Catholic Cemetery, Stockton, California, U.S.
- Other names: Carl David Weber, Charles M. Weber, Charles Martin Weber, Don Carlos Maria Weber
- Spouse: Helen Murphy
- Relatives: Martin Murphy Sr. (father-in-law), Martin Murphy Jr. (brother-in-law), John Marion Murphy (brother-in-law), Daniel Martin Murphy (brother-in-law), Charles M. Weber III (grandson)

Signature
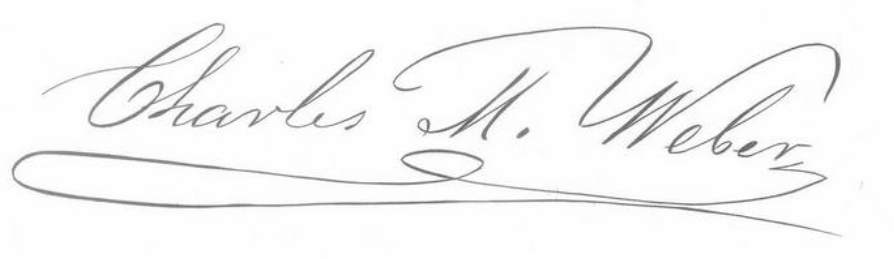

Carl David Maria Weber (né Karl David Weber; February 18, 1814 – May 4, 1881) was a Palatine-born American settler and entrepreneur. He was the founder of Stockton, California, and his former residence Weber Point Home is now a historical site. He served as a captain in the military of the United States during the Mexican–American War (1846–1848). He was also known as Carl David Weber, Charles M. Weber, Charles Martin Weber, and Don Carlos Maria Weber.

== Early life ==
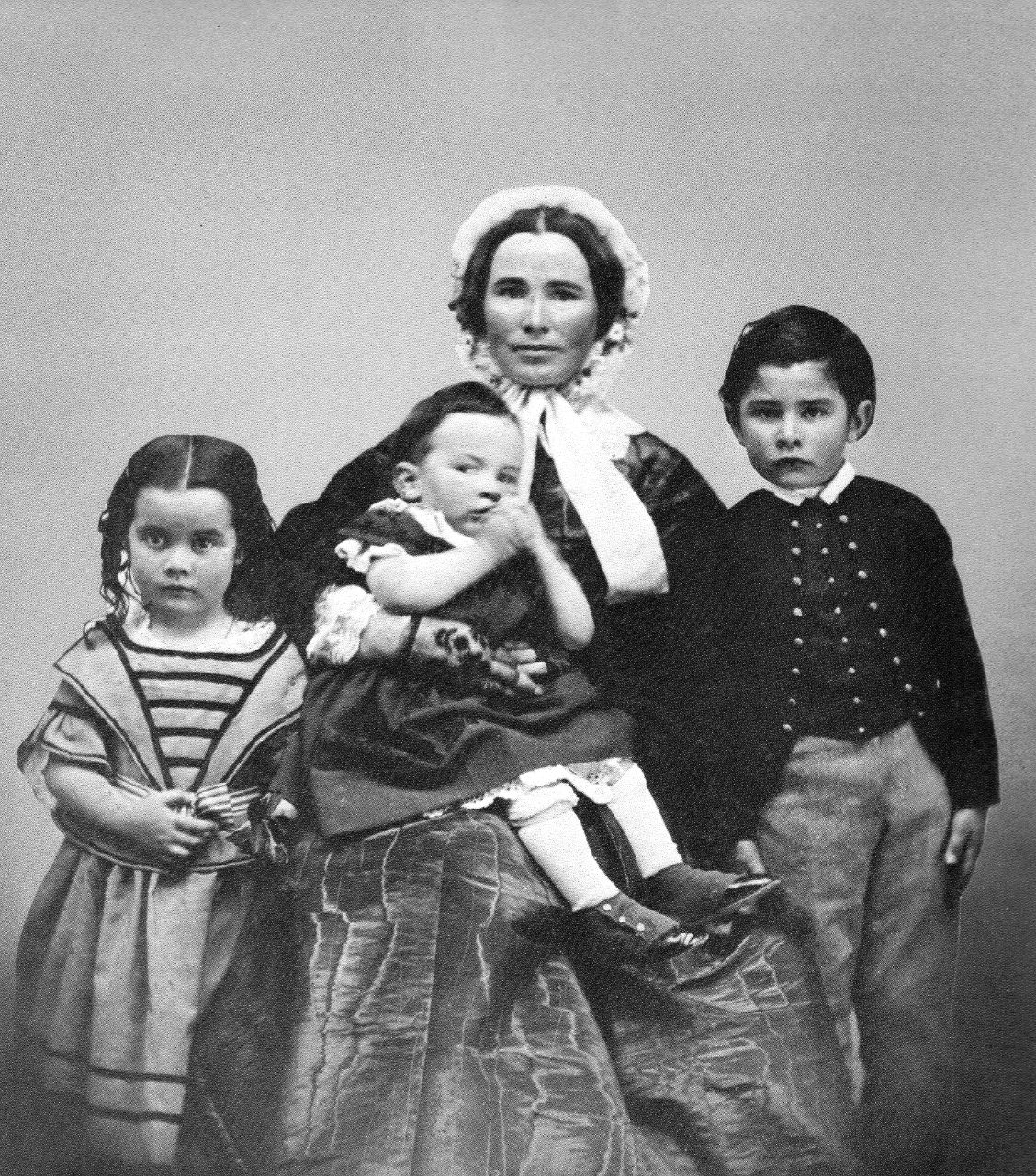
Helen Murphy Weber, with her children (c. 1857); left to right: Julia, Thomas, and Charles II

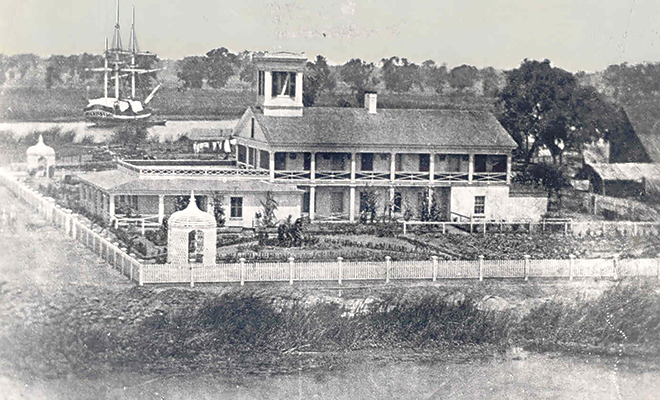
Weber Point Home, c. 1875

Karl David Weber was born on February 18, 1814, in Steinwenden, Palatinate, Kingdom of Bavaria (now Rhineland-Palatinate, Germany). He was the son of Henriette (née Geul) and Carl Gottfried Weber. He came from a Reformed family of pastors. He spent his childhood and youth in Homburg.

== Migration ==
Weber immigrated in 1836 to the United States with his cousin Theodor Engelmann. In the winter of 1836, Weber was in New Orleans, Louisiana but little details are known about that time period. After spending time in Republic of Texas (now Texas), he came overland from Missouri to California with the Bartleson–Bidwell Party in 1841, arriving to Alta California when it was Mexico-controlled. Shortly after his arrival, he began calling himself Charles, and later adopted the name Don Carlos Maria Weber.

== California ==
In 1842, Weber settled in the Pueblo of San José (now San Jose, California) and started a business partnership and department store with an English-born Mexican citizen, William “Guillermo” Gulnac (1801–1851). Gulnac and Weber dissolved their partnership in 1843. Weber acquired the Rancho Cañada de San Felipe y Las Animas southeast of San Jose.

In January 1845, Gulnac received a large tract of land on the east bank of the San Joaquin River which was purchased from the Mexican government. Gulnac's attempts to settle the Rancho Campo de los Franceses (English: Ranch of French Camp) failed, as he was afraid of the local Yokuts people, and in 1845 he sold a portion of the land to Weber. This tract of land was named because it was where the French beaver trappers had camped over the years. The chief of the Yokuts, was Jose Jesus. Weber and Jose Jesus became friends which would allow for Weber to settle the land.

Weber acquired nearly 20,000 hectares (49,000 acres) of land. Weber converted to Catholicism and changed his name to Don Carlos Maria Weber, which was a requirement for acquiring Mexican citizenship and for owning land in Alta California at that time. In 1847, Weber started building on his land residential buildings, stables and a place for rodeos. The settlement, initially called Tuleburg, was later renamed Stockton, California by Weber after the United States Navy officer Robert F. Stockton. When the settlement was established, sometime around 1849, immigrants set out for Stockton, many from Germany with a letter from Weber's father. After Stockton was founded, the town grew quickly.

Weber was first considered a Californio, and then an American. He was offered a captaincy by Mexican General José Castro during the Mexican–American War (1846–1848), which he declined. He later became a captain in the cavalry of the United States.

He returned from the California gold mines in 1850 where he founded the Stockton Mining and Trading Company two years earlier. Weber married in 1850 to Helen Murphy (1822–1895), a daughter of Martin Murphy Sr. from the Murphy family, an early settler of Santa Clara County and owner of Rancho Ojo del Agua de la Coche. The Murphys were an influential Catholic immigrant family of Irish descent, who had come to Alta California with the Stephens–Townsend–Murphy Party in 1844. They had two sons, Charles Martin Weber (1851–1912) and Thomas Jefferson Weber (1855–1892), and a daughter, Julia Helen Weber (1853–1935). The Weber family settled in the Weber Point Home at 221 North Center Street in Stockton.

His brother Adolph Weber (1825–1906) migrated to California in 1853, and settled in San Francisco. Adoph worked as a chemist at the California State Mint and later founded Humboldt Savings and Loan in 1869.

== Shooting of Augustus Heslep ==
In 1863, Weber became involved in a violent dispute with Augustus M. Heslep, a lawyer representing a claimant who was contesting the boundaries of Weber's land grant. On the evening of July 18, 1863, Heslep's process server went to Weber's residence to serve papers and was caned by Weber, suffering nine cuts to the scalp. What happened next is contested. According to one account, Heslep approached Weber and urged him to "compromise that matter"; Weber, taking this as an attempt at blackmail, drew a derringer and shot him in the back as he turned to leave. The ball perforated Heslep's left lung and exited through his chest. Weber surrendered to the chief of police the following morning and posted bail, and the criminal case was eventually dismissed. Heslep sued Weber for $50,000 in damages and a jury awarded $30,000, which Judge Orville C. Pratt later reduced to $15,000.

== Death ==
Weber died on May 4, 1881, in Stockton, California. He was buried at San Joaquin Catholic Cemetery in Stockton.

He had been the subject of a historical marker located at Weber Point in Stockton, however it was vandalized and has yet to be replaced as of 2025.

His grandson Charles M. Weber III (1893–1987) served in the California State Assembly for the 11th district for multiple terms.
