= Martin Murphy Sr. =

Irish-born American settler, farmer (1785–1865)

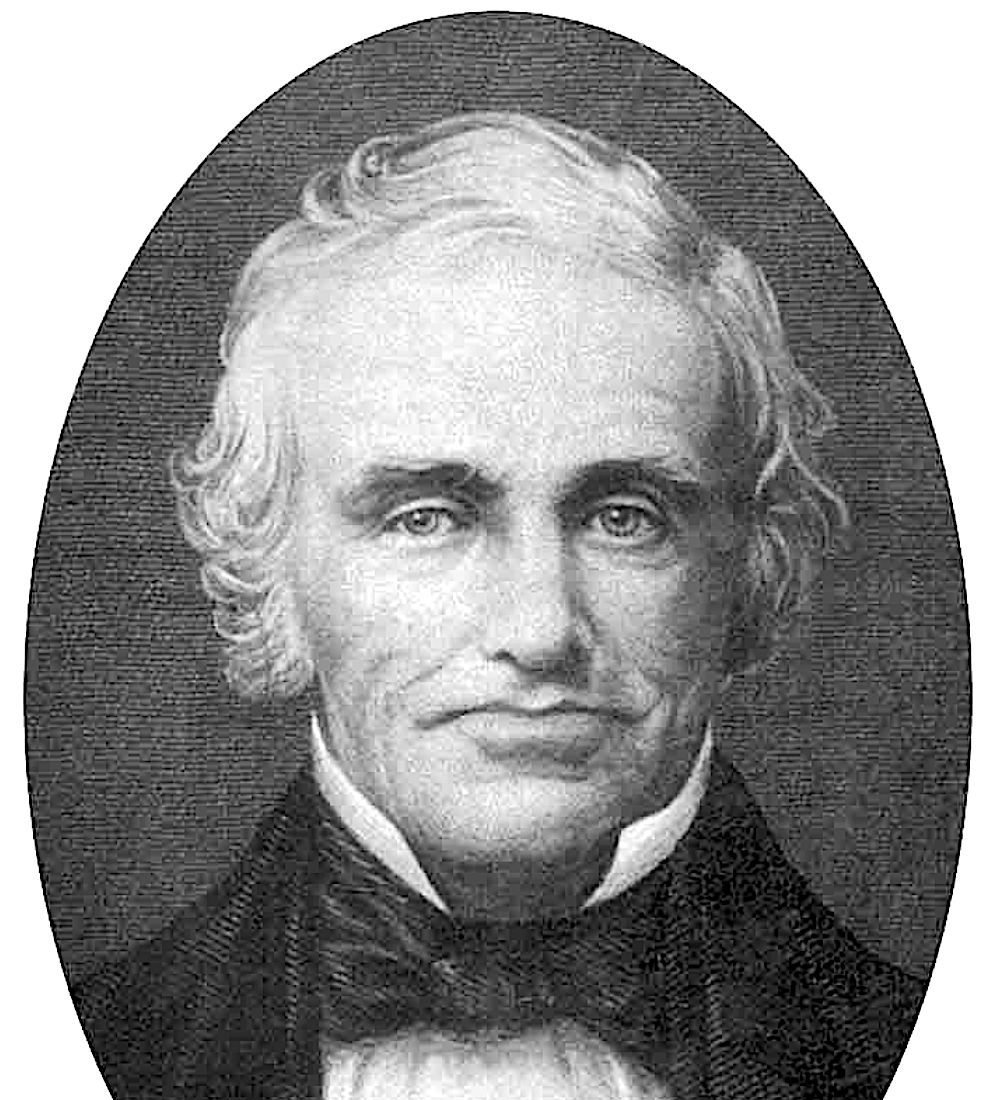
- Martin Murphy Sr. (1850)
- Born: November 12, 1785; County Wexford, Ireland
- Died: March 17, 1865 (aged 79); San Jose, California, U.S.
- Resting place: Santa Clara Mission Cemetery, Santa Clara, California, U.S.
- Spouse: Mary Foley (m. c. 1806–1843; her death)
- Children: 9, including Martin Murphy Jr., John Marion Murphy, Daniel Martin Murphy
- Relatives: Carl David Maria Weber (son-in-law), Bernard D. Murphy (grandson), Patrick W. Murphy (grandson), Elizabeth Murphy Taaffe (granddaughter)

Martin Murphy Sr. (November 12, 1785 – March 17, 1865) was an Irish-born American farmer, and an early settler. He founded the town of San Martin, California. He was the patriarch of the Murphy family, who were on the first wagon train to cross the Sierra Nevada, they were early settlers in California, and founders of early Santa Clara Valley.

== Early life ==
Martin Murphy Sr. was born on November 12, 1785, in County Wexford, Ireland. He was Catholic, and persecuted by the Protestant ruling class and his move to the Americas was an opportunity of religious freedom.

Around c. 1806, he married Mary Foley in County Wexford. Together they had 9 children.

== Migration ==
In 1820, Murphy migrated with his wife and children to Quebec Province, Lower Canada (now Canada), and settled in an Irish community in Frampton for the next twenty years.

In 1840, the family moved to Atchison County, Missouri to a settlement called Irish Grove. That area was subject to many disease, and his wife Mary died in 1843.

=== Missouri to California ===
On May 6, 1844, Murphy and his sons gathered a wagon train to move to California; made up of the Stephenson family, Townsend family and the Murphy family, called the Stephens–Townsend–Murphy Party. The Murphy family had twenty-three members on the wagon train, it was the largest family participating. It was the first to cross the Sierra Nevada in 1844.

== California ==
In 1846, he purchased the 9,000 acres (3,600 ha) Rancho Ojo del Agua de la Coche in present-day Santa Clara County, California, where he remained for the rest of his life. The land encompassed present-day Los Altos, Sunnyvale, and south as far as Morgan Hill. Murphy founded the small town of San Martin, California in Santa Clara County, where he had built a Catholic church and lived.

Murphy Sr. died on March 17, 1865, at his daughter Margaret's house in San Jose, California. His remains were moved on March 18th, and he was followed by 101 horse carriages in a procession. He is buried at Santa Clara Mission Cemetery. After his death, his vast land was portioned, and inherited by his children.

A historical marker dedicated to the Murphy family is located in San Martin, California, and was erected by the Santa Clara County Parks Department.

Five of the Murphy family members served in the California legislature: Patrick W. Murphy, Bernard D. Murphy, John C. Murphy, J. E. Murphy, and R. W. Murphy. The family were the subject of Marjorie Pierce's book, The Martin Murphy Family Saga (2000); and the PBS documentary film, The Forgotten Journey (2021), produced by John Krizek.
