= Daniel Martin Murphy =

Canadian-born American settler and rancher in California (1826–1882)

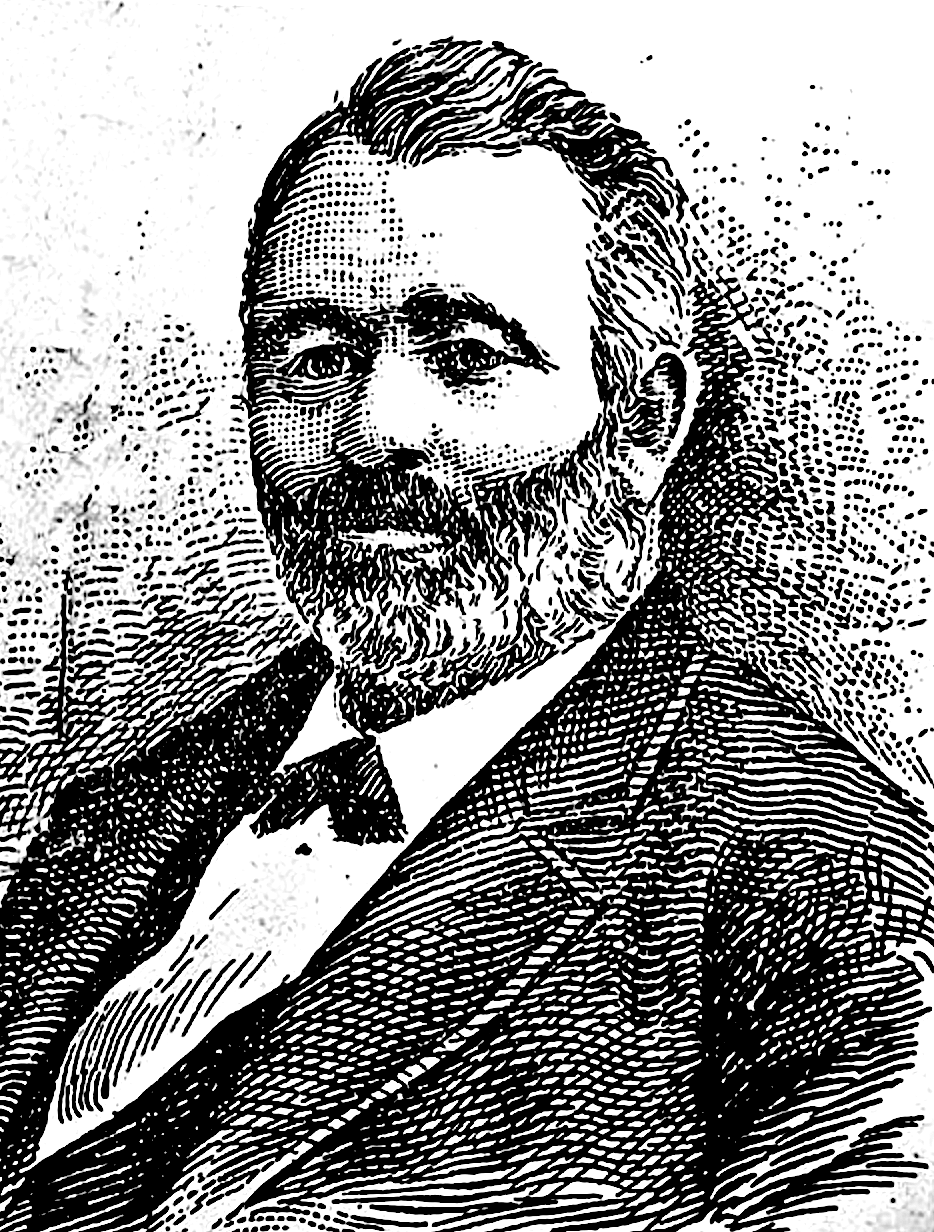
- Born: January 17, 1826; Frampton, Quebec, Lower Canada (now Canada)
- Died: October 22, 1882 (aged 56); Elko, Nevada, U.S.
- Resting place: Santa Clara Mission Cemetery, Santa Clara, California, U.S.
- Spouse: Maria Fisher Ceseña (m. 1851–1882; his death)
- Children: 6
- Father: Martin Murphy Sr.
- Relatives: Martin Murphy Jr. (sibling), John Marion Murphy (sibling), Carl David Maria Weber (brother-in-law)

Daniel Martin Murphy Sr. (January 17, 1826 – October 22, 1882) was a Canadian-born American rancher, farmer, landowner and an early settler in California. He was one of the wealthiest property owners in the United States during his lifetime, with ownership of Rancho Refugio de la Laguna Seca (near present-day Morgan Hill, California), a ranch in Durango, Mexico, and a ranch in Elko, Nevada. He co-founded the mining town of Murphys, California.

== Early life, and migration ==
Daniel Martin Murphy was born on January 17, 1826, in Frampton, Quebec, Lower Canada (now Canada), to Irish parents Martin Murphy Sr. and Mary Foley from the Murphy family. He was the youngest of nine children.

In 1840, the family moved to Atchison County, Missouri to a settlement called Irish Grove. His mother died at Irish Grove, as there had been many disease.

On May 6, 1844, Murphy Sr. and his sons gathered a wagon train to move to California; they were all a part of the Stephens–Townsend–Murphy Party, led by his father. They were the first wagon train to cross the Sierra Nevada.

== California ==
During the Mexican–American War (1846–1848), Murphy fought under Manuel Micheltorena. He served as a private in Company G, and later as a sergeant in Company H in the California Battalion, a volunteer company, under John C. Frémont in 1846.

After the war Daniel and his older brother John Marion Murphy earned a living as merchants, but like many others, they began prospecting when the California Gold Rush began. Their brother-in-law Carl David Maria Weber (married to sister Helen), had formed the Stockton Mining Company in Placerville, California (formerly known as Hangtown). They initially started mining work with Weber under his company. The brothers eventually decided to go out on their own and moved south. In July 1848, the Murphy brothers found gold at what they called "Murphys Old Diggings," later known as "Murphys New Diggings," "Murphy's Camp," and eventually by 1835 it was just "Murphys". The Murphy brothers made far more money as merchants than as miners. Daniel Murphy was a member of the Carson Creek Consolidated Co. (or Morgan Mine).

After a few years they both brothers moved back to Santa Clara County, California near their father's Rancho Ojo del Agua de la Coche. In January 1851, Daniel Murphy married Maria Fisher Ceseña (also written as Mary Fisher, and later Mary Fisher Murphy–Colombet). Together they had 6 children, however only 3 of the children lived into adulthood. His wife had lived on the neighboring farm with her parents Captain William Fisher from Boston, and Liberata Ceseña Ojeda from Cabo San Lucas. Right before their marriage, her father William Fisher died and left the new couple his rancho. They inherited the 19,000 acres (7,700 ha) Rancho Refugio de la Laguna Seca, near present day Morgan Hill, California in Santa Clara County.

Murphy later purchased a 4,000,000 acres (1,600,000 ha) cattle ranch in Durango, Mexico; which in turn made him one of the wealthiest property owners in the United States. Additionally he owned tracts of land in Tulare County, California and in Arizona.

== Late life, death, and legacy ==
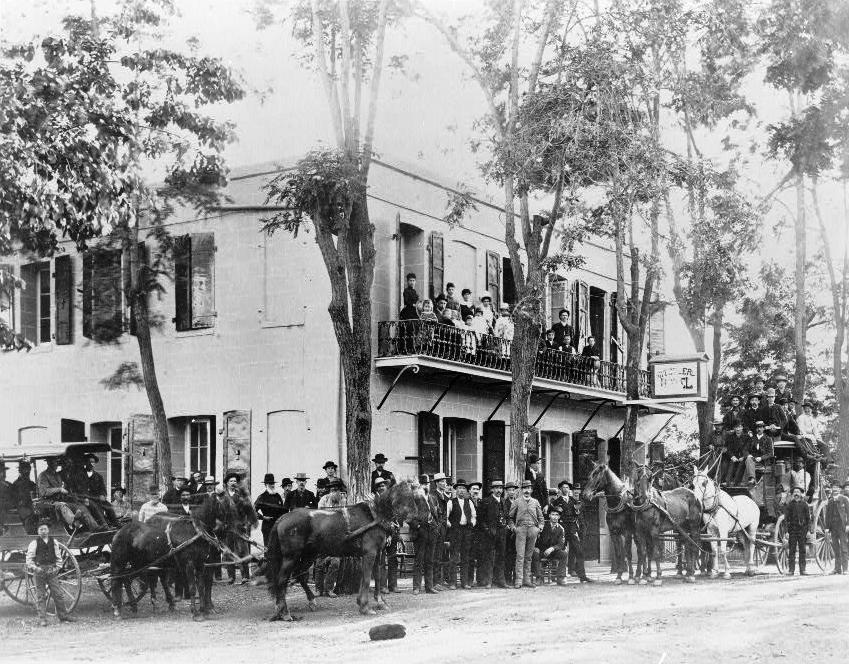
Murphys Hotel (c. 1860s) in Murphys, California

In his later years Murphy moved to Elko, Nevada, where he raised cattle on his ranch. He lived separated from his wife but they did not divorce. Murphy was considered one of the greatest cattlemen in the world towards the end of his life. He was running cattle in a snow storm when he caught pneumonia.

Murphy died of pneumonia on October 22, 1882, in Elko. He was buried at Santa Clara Mission Cemetery in Santa Clara, California.

After his father's death, Daniel Martin Murphy Jr. (1863–1915) inherited his father's land in Durango, Mexico, and through poor administration he lost most of the land. His daughter Diana Helen Murphy (1869–1937) married Hiram Morgan Hill, and inherited all of her father's lands in Santa Clara County, and in Nevada.

The town of Murphys, California is named after the brothers. A historical marker dedicated to remembering Murphy's death was erected by the Morgan Hill Historical Society in Morgan Hill, California.

The Murphys Hotel (formerly the Mitchler Hotel) in Murphys, California was named for the two brothers, and is reportedly haunted.
