= Frampton, Quebec =

Frampton
- Municipality
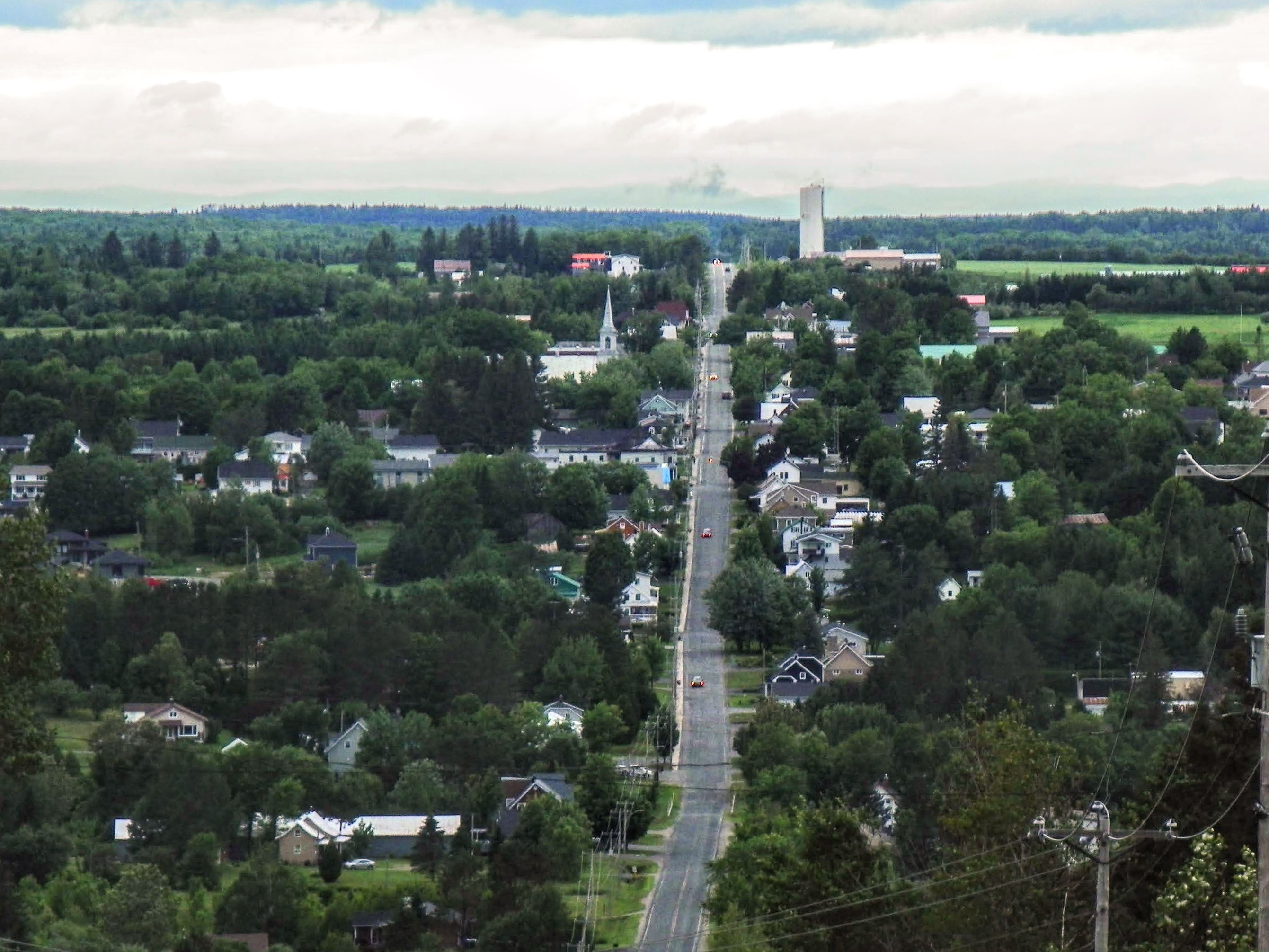
- The village.

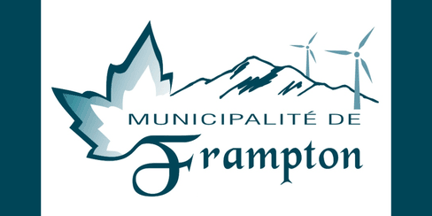
- Flag Coat of arms

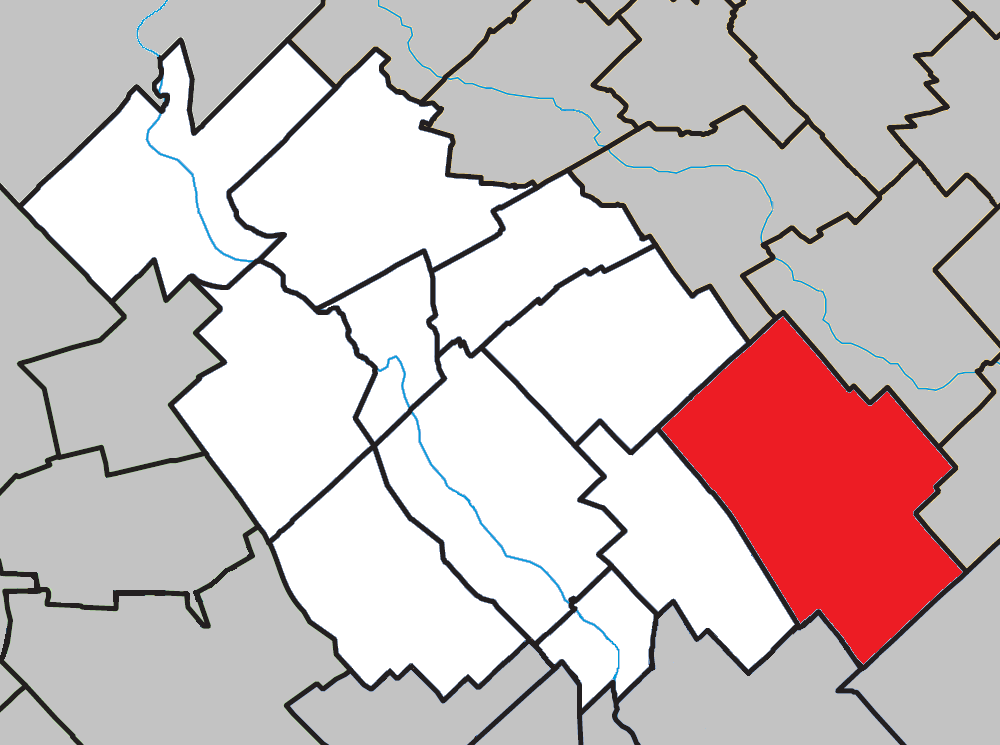
- Location within La Nouvelle-Beauce RCM.

- Location in southern Quebec.
- Coordinates: 46°28′N 70°48′W
- Country: Canada
- Province: Quebec
- Region: Chaudière-Appalaches
- RCM: La Nouvelle-Beauce
- Constituted: July 1, 1855

Government
  - Mayor: Gina Cloutier
  - Federal riding: Beauce
  - Prov. riding: Beauce-Nord

Area
  - Total: 151.50 km^{2} (58.49 sq mi)
  - Land: 151.27 km^{2} (58.41 sq mi)

Population (2021)
  - Total: 1,309
  - Density: 8.7/km^{2} (23/sq mi)
  - Pop 2016-2021: ▲6.0%
  - Dwellings: 655
- Time zone: UTC−5 (EST)
  - Summer (DST): UTC−4 (EDT)
- Postal code(s): G0R 1M0
- Area codes: 418 and 581
- Highways: R-112; R-216; R-275
- Website: www.nouvelle beauce.com/frampton

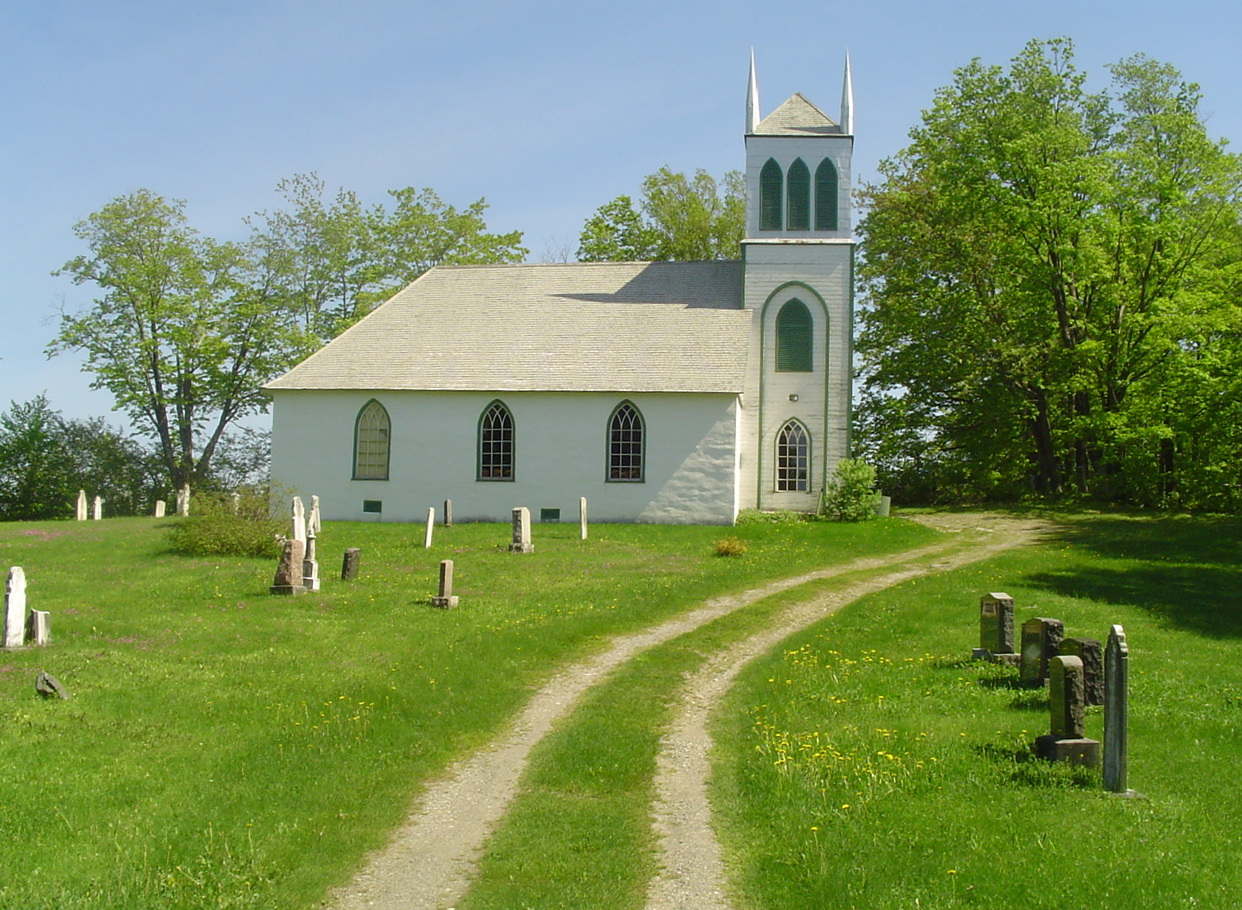
Christ Church of Springbrook Anglican Church in Frampton, Quebec

Frampton is a municipality in La Nouvelle-Beauce Regional County Municipality in the Chaudière-Appalaches administrative region of Quebec.

After the War of 1812, land grants were given to soldiers in the region as reward for their service to the British Crown. Brothers William and Gilbert Henderson, originally of the Shetland Islands, and Pierre-Edouard Desbarats, partnered in developing Frampton Township along with the surrounding towns of Saint-Malachie, where both Henderson brothers are buried, and Standon Township. The towns grew with the influx of Irish immigrants to Canada after the war. It is said that the well-read William Henderson gave the town the name Frampton in honour of Mary Frampton, an author in England from that period.

In 1844, the 1,662 inhabitants of Frampton were almost exclusively Irish and English speaking. However, 100 years later, the Irish community had practically vanished because of recessions; chain migration to New England, Western Canada, and Western United States; and assimilation to the French-Canadian culture.
