= Stephens–Townsend–Murphy Party =

19th-century American pioneers to California

The Stephens–Townsend–Murphy Party consisted of ten families who migrated from Iowa to California prior to the Mexican–American War and the California Gold Rush. The group is significant in California history because they were the first wagon train to cross the Sierra Nevada in 1844, during the expansion of the American West. They pioneered the first route at or near what was later named Donner Pass. The crossing was a year before the third expedition of John Charles Frémont, two years before the Donner Party, and five years before the 1848–1849 gold rush. Three other known European exploration crossings of the Sierra Nevada had previously occurred at points south of this however, including Frémont's second expedition the previous winter, at Carson Pass.

== Journey ==
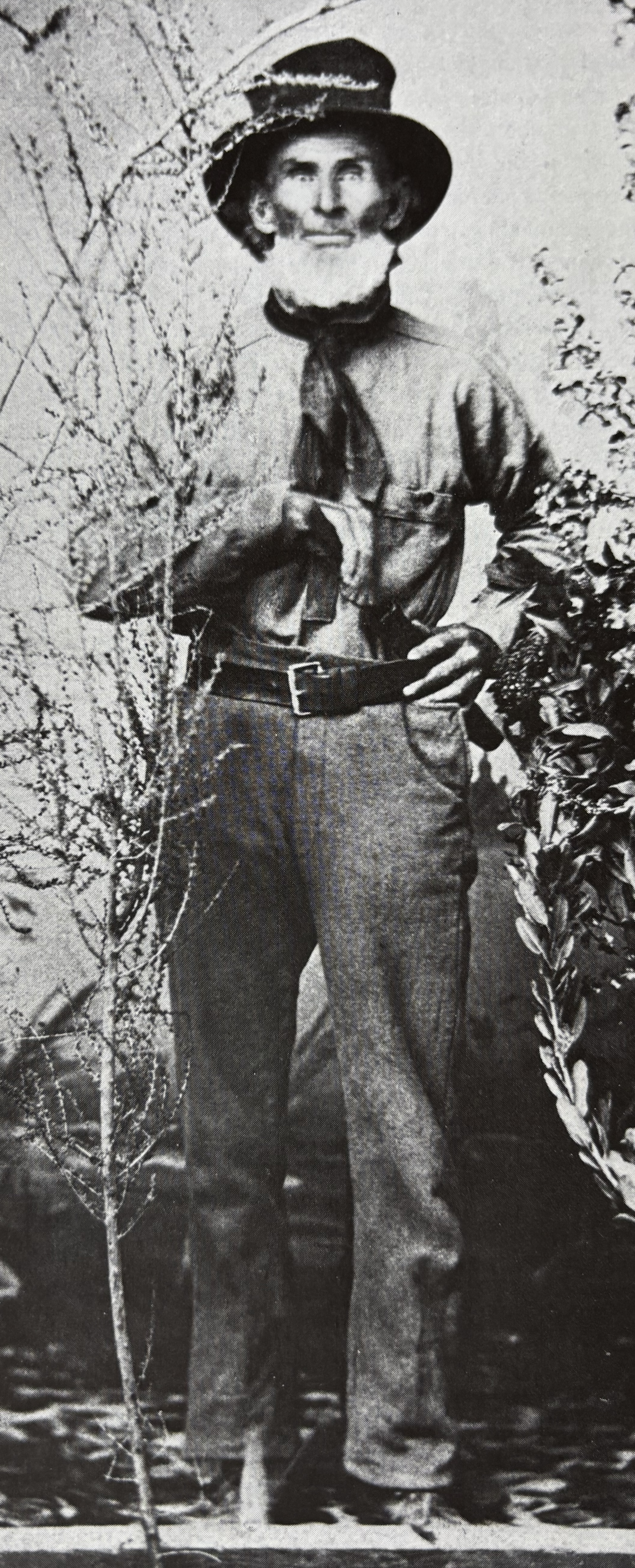
Elisha Stephens, 1860

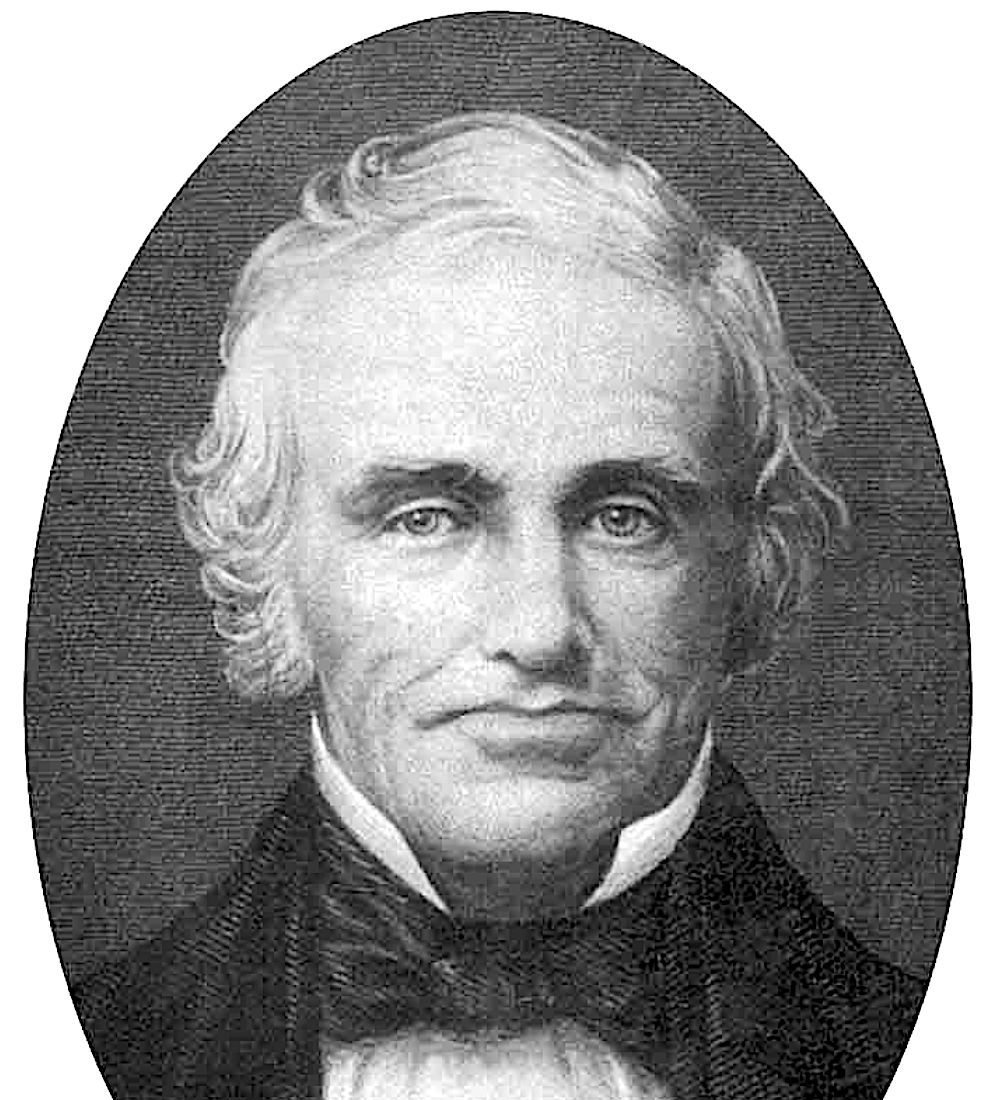
Martin Murphy Sr.

The 51-member Stephens–Townsend–Murphy Party left near present-day Council Bluffs, Iowa, on May 6, 1844. The wagon train was organized by Martin Murphy Sr. and his sons. Elisha Stephens (also spelled Elijah and Elisha Stevens) was hired as the trail guide, and he had spent several years as a mountain man and beaver hunter in the Pacific Northwest, as well as worked as a blacksmith. They departed with a larger group of Oregon-bound settlers in a train of 40 wagons. Fifty travelers left Iowa; 52 arrived at Sutter's Fort with the Stephens party, as there were two births along the way.

John Townsend, his wife Elizabeth, and her younger brother Moses Schallenberger were also going west.Townsend wanted a chance at grand adventure and opportunity in California. He would become the first licensed physician in California.

The largest family group in the party was headed by Martin Murphy Sr. The Murphy family had 26 members. As Irish Catholics, the Murphy family, along with the Martin and Sullivan families, were seeking religious, economic, and political freedoms in California. The group included James Miller (1814–1890), an Irishman, who would marry Martin Murphy, Sr.'s third daughter and settle at Rancho San Pedro, Santa Margarita y Las Gallinas near San Rafael.

The party was guided by mountain men Caleb Greenwood and Isaac Hitchcock. In Wyoming, Hitchcock, who had been "trapping and trading" in California in 1832, led the party west from the Big Sandy River to the Green River on a bypass of Fort Bridger that came to be known as the Sublette-Greenwood Cutoff. This bypass covered a dangerous 40 miles (64 km) without water for livestock, but shortened the common route by 85 miles (137 km) and seven days. This cutoff, later popularized in a guide book, was used heavily by miners heading to the California Gold Rush.

In the Sierra Nevada they encountered snow and on November 14, 1844, the party split. Six of the party, Elizabeth Townsend, her servant Francis, Oliver Magnan, and the siblings, Ellen (or Helen), John, and Daniel Murphy, set off on horseback following the Truckee River southward with the goal of reaching Sutter's Fort quickly and sending back help. They became the first European-Americans to set foot on the shore of Lake Tahoe on November 16 (John C. Frémont had been the first European-American to only view it the previous February). They arrived at the fort on December 10.

The rest of the party continued until reaching Truckey's (or Truckee) Lake (now Donner Lake). Here, they left six of their eleven wagons because of difficulties getting the wagons over the pass and carried on with the remaining five. At one point they had to unhitch the wagons and haul them up a cliff with makeshift pulleys while the oxen were led through a narrow slot. On November 25 they managed to reach the top of the pass. Three men, Joseph Foster, Allan Montgomery, and Moses Schallenberger, returned to the abandoned wagons with the intent of watching over them until the snow melted. They quickly built a cabin (later used by the Donner Party), but soon realized that it would be very difficult for them to survive the winter. They set out after the party ahead of them on makeshift snowshoes, but after the first day, the youngest, eighteen-year-old Moses Schallenberger realized he could not press on and returned to the wagons. He survived only by trapping High Sierra foxes for food.

The rest of the party, after crossing the pass, continued until snow made it impossible to travel with wagons on the upper Yuba River valley. They set up camp, and, on December 6, seventeen of the adult men pushed on to find help, while the women, children, and two adult men remained in camp. Most of the men in the advance party were then enticed or coerced to fight with Captain John Sutter for Mexican California Governor Manuel Micheltorena in exchange for promises of land grants. Instead of joining Sutter, Dennis Martin returned to the upper Yuba with supplies for the women and children. Upon learning of the plight of Moses Schallenberger, twenty-three-year-old Martin set out to cross the snowbound Sierra Nevada in mid-winter (February, 1845) to rescue Schallenberger at Donner Lake. Upon reaching the lake, Martin showed Schallenberger how to construct proper snowshoes and then the two crossed the Sierra successfully to the Central Valley.

== Afterwards ==
Plaque at Donner Pass commemorating the party

Elisha Stephens settled in the San Jose/Cupertino area, where Stevens Creek [sic] is named for him. In 1862, he left the area, heading to Kern County in central California. He was the first non-native settler in what is today the city of Bakersfield. A state historic plaque in that city marks the approximate site of his homestead. Stephens died in Bakersfield in 1887. He was buried in Union Cemetery. His gravesite was discovered in 2009 by members of the Kern County Genealogical Society. On May 1, 2010, the Oregon-California Trails Association (OCTA) California/Nevada Chapter in cooperation with the Kern County Historical Society (KCHS) installed a historical plaque at the gravesite of Elisha Stephens.

John Townsend was California's first licensed physician and was, for a short time in 1848, alcalde or mayor of San Francisco; Townsend Street in San Francisco is named for him. He and his wife, Elizabeth, treated the victims of the 1850 cholera epidemic in San Jose until they died of it in December 1850. Elizabeth's younger brother, Moses Schallenberger, settled in Santa Clara county and died in 1909. Schallenberger Elementary School in the San José Unified School District and Schallenberger Ridge just south of Donner Lake are named for him.

In 1846, Martin Murphy Sr. purchased the Rancho Ojo del Agua de la Coche. Son Martin Murphy Jr. was the founder of the city of Sunnyvale. Sons John and Daniel Murphy struck gold in the Sierra foothills, then made a fortune selling dry goods; the town they established in still bears the family name of Murphys. Helen Murphy, the youngest daughter of Martin Sr., married Charles Maria Weber, the founder of the city of Stockton.

Dennis Martin also struck gold in the Sierra and purchased ranch properties from the grantees of Rancho Cañada de Raymundo and Rancho Corte de Madera which include much of the modern day back lands of Stanford University, including the Stanford Linear Accelerator Center, Jasper Ridge Biological Preserve, the Ladera subdivision and the Webb Ranch. After financial misfortune and land disputes typical of the era, his lands were bought by Leland Stanford in November, 1882. Dennis Martin died in June 1890 and was buried at the St. Denis Cemetery (Martin had built his own church) on his former property (then Stanford's). Woodside's Dennis Martin Creek is named for him.

== Sources ==
- Pages 100–108, 118, 126, 327–28, "Old Greenwood", Revised edition, by co-authors Charles Kelly and Dale L. Morgan, The Talisman Press 1965, Georgetown, California.
- Appendix to "First And Last Consul" by author John A. Hawgood, page 113 (re: Isaac Hitchcock in CA in 1832) and page 118 (re: Joseph Walker in CA in 1833).
- Re: Newly discovered Elisha Stephens' gravesite....Kern Gen Vol 47 No 1 March 2010, published by the Kern County Genealogical Society.
- Rose, James J. Sierra Trailblazers: First Pioneer Wagons Over the Sierra Nevada
- video Forgotten Journey, California Trail, Forgotten Journey Productions, 2004.
- "Finding the Way", USDA Forest Service, Tahoe National Forest, Big Bend Visitor Center, 1999
- "Sublette Greenwood Cutoff", Wyoming Emigrant Trails, Wyoming State Historic Preservation Office
