= National Register of Historic Places listings in Calaveras County, California =

Location of Calaveras County in California

This is a list of the National Register of Historic Places listings in Calaveras County, California.

This is intended to be a complete list of the properties and districts on the National Register of Historic Places in Calaveras County, California, United States. Latitude and longitude coordinates are provided for many National Register properties and districts; these locations may be seen together in an online map.

There are 17 properties and districts listed on the National Register in the county.

This National Park Service list is complete through NPS recent listings posted September 4, 2026.

== Current listings ==
	Name on the Register	Image	Date listed	Location	City or town	Description
1	Altaville Grammar School	Altaville Grammar School	August 24, 1979 (#79000471)	125 N. Main St. 38°04′58″N 120°33′39″W	Altaville	
2	Angels Hotel	Angels Hotel	March 24, 1972 (#72000220)	Main St. at Birds Way; 38°04′07″N 120°32′21″W	Angels Camp	
3	Calaveras County Bank	Calaveras County Bank	August 1, 1985 (#85001683)	1239 S. Main St. 38°04′10″N 120°32′23″W	Angels Camp	
4	Calaveras County Courthouse	Calaveras County Courthouse	February 28, 1972 (#72000221)	Main St. 38°11′48″N 120°40′45″W	San Andreas	
5	Calaveritas Creek Bridge		November 6, 2015 (#15000767)	Calaveritas Rd. at Calaveritas Cr. 38°09′22″N 120°36′35″W	Calaveritas	
6	Chinatown Gardens Archaeological District		March 9, 2023 (#100008712)	Address Restricted	Mokelumne Hill	
7	Sam Choy Brick Store	Sam Choy Brick Store	September 20, 1984 (#84000759)	Bird Way; 38°04′09″N 120°32′18″W	Angels Camp	
8	Copperopolis Armory	Copperopolis Armory	December 30, 1997 (#97001588)	695 Main St. 37°58′34″N 120°38′04″W	Copperopolis	
9	Copperopolis Congregational Church	Copperopolis Congregational Church	December 30, 1997 (#97001587)	411 Main St. 37°58′47″N 120°38′16″W	Copperopolis	
10	Douglas Flat School	Douglas Flat School	May 24, 1973 (#73000397)	NE of Vallecito on SR 4; 38°07′01″N 120°27′11″W	Douglas Flat	
11	Honigsberger Store	Honigsberger Store	April 2, 1992 (#92000310)	665 Main St. 37°58′34″N 120°38′07″W	Copperopolis	
12	Murphys Grammar School	Murphys Grammar School	June 8, 1973 (#73000398)	Jones St. 38°08′10″N 120°27′28″W	Murphys	
13	Murphys Hotel	Murphys Hotel	November 23, 1971 (#71000134)	Main and Algiers Sts. 38°08′15″N 120°27′50″W	Murphys	Also known as Mitchler Hotel
14	Reed's Store	Reed's Store	April 2, 1992 (#92000309)	679 Main St. 37°58′34″N 120°38′05″W	Copperopolis	
15	John J. Snyder House	John J. Snyder House	August 2, 1984 (#84000760)	247 W. St. Charles St. 38°11′51″N 120°41′06″W	San Andreas	
16	Thorn House	Thorn House	February 23, 1972 (#72000222)	87 E. St. Charles St. 38°11′43″N 120°40′40″W	San Andreas	
17	Utica Mansion	Utica Mansion	May 31, 1984 (#84000764)	1103 Bush St. 38°04′17″N 120°32′35″W	Angels Camp	

== See also ==
- List of National Historic Landmarks in California
- National Register of Historic Places listings in California
- California Historical Landmarks in Calaveras County, California
