= Brick Store =

Brick Store may refer to any of the following, all of which are on the National Register of Historic Places (NRHP):

- Sam Choy Brick Store, on the NRHP in California
- Old Brick Store, on the NRHP in Delaware
- Brick Store (Covington, Georgia), on the NRHP in Georgia
- Red Brick Store, a contributing structure of the Nauvoo Historic District, Nauvoo, Illinois
- Brick Store (Bath, New Hampshire), on the NRHP in New Hampshire
- Brick Store Building, on the NRHP in New York
- Hillsdale Brick Store, on the NRHP in North Carolina
- Boon Brick Store, on the NRHP in Oregon

Also:

- Brick Store (Yarmouth, Maine), built in 1862
