= Prince-Garibaldi Building =

Historical Landmark in Altaville, California, United States

- Location within California Location within the United States
- 38.079117°N 120.554199°W
- Location: 4298 Main Street; Altaville, California

History
- Built: 1852

California Historical Landmark
- Reference no.: 735

Prince-Garibaldi Building is a historical building in Altaville, California in Calaveras County. Altaville, California is just north of the town of Angels Camp. The building was built by B. R. Prince and G. Garibardi in 1852 as a general store on the first floor. The building is built built by David Strosberger out of rhyolite tuff stones designed. In 1857 a second floor was added and used for the store owner's living space. For a time the building was the Prince Undertaking Parlor with a plumed horse hearse. The Prince-Garibaldi Building is a California Historical Landmark No. 735 of California State Route 49.

Bartholomew Romaggi Prince, B. R. Prince, Bartolo Prince, was born on March 7, 1829, in Romaggi, Liguria, Italy. He came to California in 1852. He married Mary Ann Hanratty (1839-1890) born in Northern Ireland died in Altaville. Prince and Garabardi opened the goods store in Altaville. Later he opened a quartz mine looking for gold in the California Gold Rush. Prince opened and ran the Altaville Hotel (on Murphys Road), livery stable (Prince's Livery and Feed on Angels Camp Rd. and San Andreas Rd., now the site of Altaville Aquatic Center), the Murphys Toll Road (now Grade Road), and undertaking parlor. For a time he ran a silkworm firm, the silk he sold to Italy. His silk won prizes at the local Calaveras County Fair. Prince owned most of the town's commercial firm for 47 years. When he retired he moved to Stockton, California, he died June 7, 1905, at age 76. Edward R. Prince, Frank R. Prince, Tessie R. [Prince] Favinger, Mary L. Buhrer, Lawrence G. Preston [AKA Goldstone], Bartolo and Mary Prince children and inlaws were: Frank Romaggi Prince (1861–1907), Dante Prince (1864–1911), Mary Romaggi Prince Fischer (1866–1920), Domingo Romaggi Prince (1868–1890), Joseph Romaggi Prince (1873–1923), Theresa Romaggi Prince Favinger (1873–1962) and Edward Romaggi Prince (1875–1945).

== See also ==
- California Historical Landmarks in Calaveras County
- Altaville Grammar School
- Birthplace of Archie Stevenot
- Robinson's Ferry
