= Poverty Bar, California =

Human settlement in United States of America

Coordinates: 38°13′30″N 120°54′30″W

Poverty Bar is a former settlement in Calaveras County, California, United States, active from c. 1850s to 1862, and now covered by the waters of Camanche Reservoir. The nearest major town is Campo Seco.

== History ==
Poverty Bar was founded south of the Mokelumne River from Lancha Plana in Amador County as a gold mining town during the California Gold Rush, nearby Camanche, California, Cat Camp, and Sand Hill. A post office was opened in Poverty Bar in 1858 and closed in 1864.

Poverty Bar had a major fire on the night of September 7, 1859. The fire originated in the grocery store of Lorengo & Co., near the center of the town, and spread so rapidly in different directions that in a few minutes the entire town was in flames. It appeared to have been arson, the second such incident there during that summer.

During the American Civil War the town raised the Union Guard a California Militia Company in 1861 and maintained it until its declining population forced it to be moved. "On July 23, 1866, the company was reorganized and their headquarters moved to Campo Seco."

In 1962, before the Comanche Reservoir was filled, the graves in the cemetery of Poverty Bar were transferred to the Pioneer Cemetery, and the People's Cemetery in San Andreas, California.
