= Reed's Store =

- U.S. National Register of Historic Places
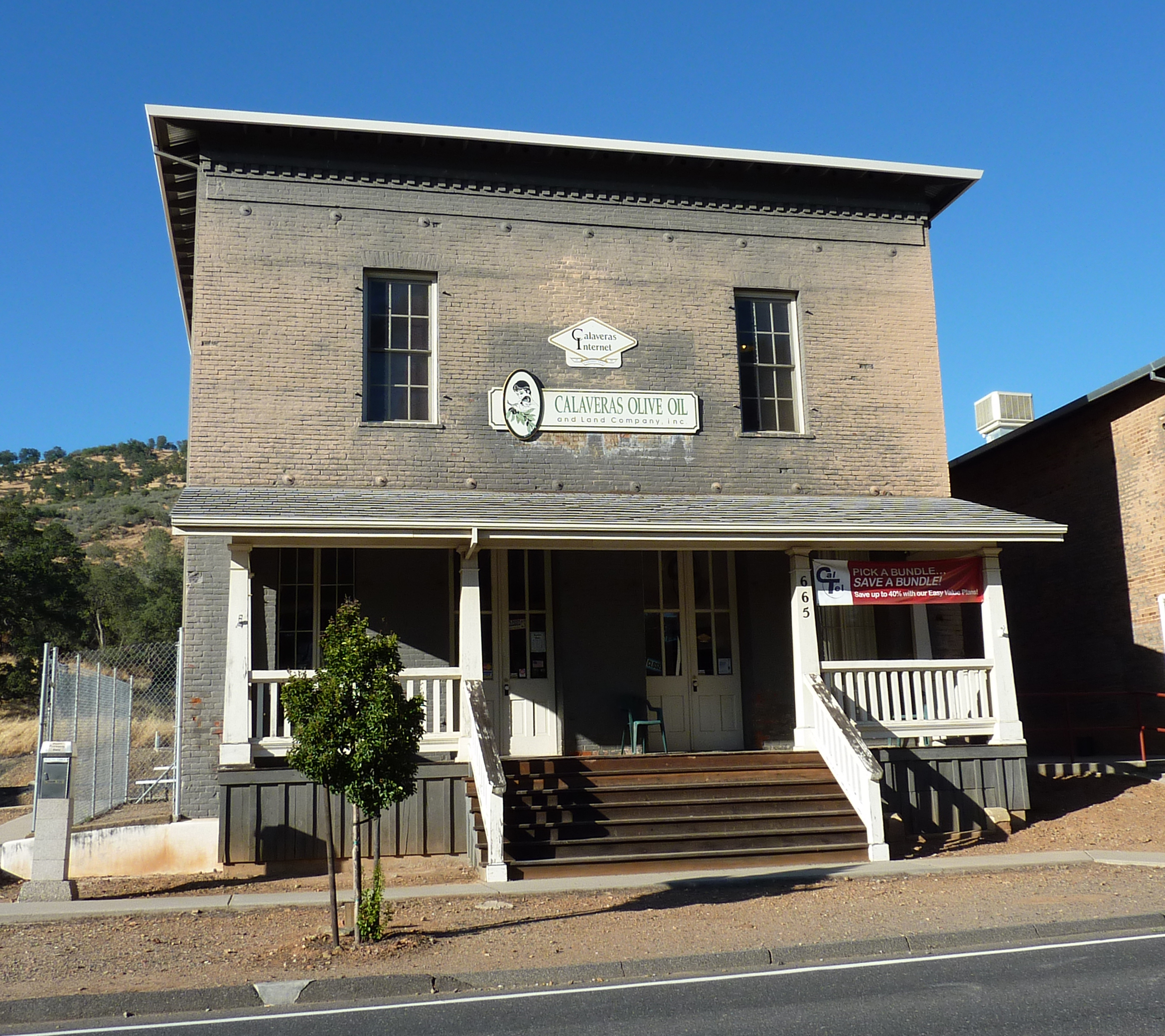

- Location within California Location within the United States
- Location: 679 Main St., Copperopolis, California
- Coordinates: 37°58′34″N 120°38′5″W
- Area: less than one acre
- Built: 1861
- Architectural style: Neoclassical
- NRHP reference No.: 92000309
- Added to NRHP: April 2, 1992

Reed's Store is a historic building located at 679 Main St. in Copperopolis, California. William K. Reed, a miner and one of the first discoverers of copper in Copperopolis, built the store in 1861 to serve the growing mining town. The two-story brick store was designed in the Neoclassical style, a common design for commercial establishments at the time. Reed's Store was the most successful store in Copperopolis until 1867, when a fire and the declining copper industry greatly diminished the town's population. Various lessees rented the store until mine owner Charles Ames bought it in 1890; Ames sold the store to merchant Charles Fontana by 1900. In 1906, the store became the property of the Union Copper Mining Company, which made the building its headquarters. The company, later renamed the Calaveras Copper Mining Company, occupied the building throughout the town's 1909–1929 copper boom. The store is now one of four buildings remaining from the 1860s in Calaveras; it is adjacent to two others, the Copperopolis Armory and the Honigsberger Store.

Reed's Store was added to the National Register of Historic Places on April 2, 1992.
