= Limerick, California =

Limerick, California may refer to:

- Camanche, California
- San Ramon, California
