= Cherokee Flat, California =

Cherokee Flat, California may refer to:

- Cherokee, California, in Butte County
- Altaville, California, in Calaveras County
