= Robinson's Ferry (boat) =

Historical Landmark in Angels Camp, California, United States

- Location within California Location within the United States
- 38.0089277°N 120.5046527°W
- Location: Angels Camp, California

History
- Built: 1848

California Historical Landmark
- Reference no.: 276

Robinson's Ferry is a historical site in Angels Camp, California in Calaveras County. John W. Robinson and Stephen Mead founded a ferry in 1848. The ferry crossed the river, where New Melones Lake is now. The New Melones Lake Bridge now crosses where the ferry was. The ferry was used to move California Gold Rush miners, their cargo and animals across the river. Harvey Wood purchased the ferry in 1856. The fare to cross was 50 cents for each person or animal crossing. The site of Robinson's Ferry a California Historical Landmark No. 276. A marker is on California State Route 49 near the bridge across New Melones Lake. The historical marker was placed there in 1949 by California Centennial Commission, and the base was built Angels Camp Lions Club. The Marker is 5.6 miles south of Angels Camp and 0.3 miles north of New Melones Lake Reservoir.

== See also ==
- California Historical Landmarks in Calaveras County
- Prince-Garibaldi Building
- Birthplace of Archie Stevenot
- Angels Hotel
