= Utica Mansion =

Historic house in California, United States

- U.S. National Register of Historic Places
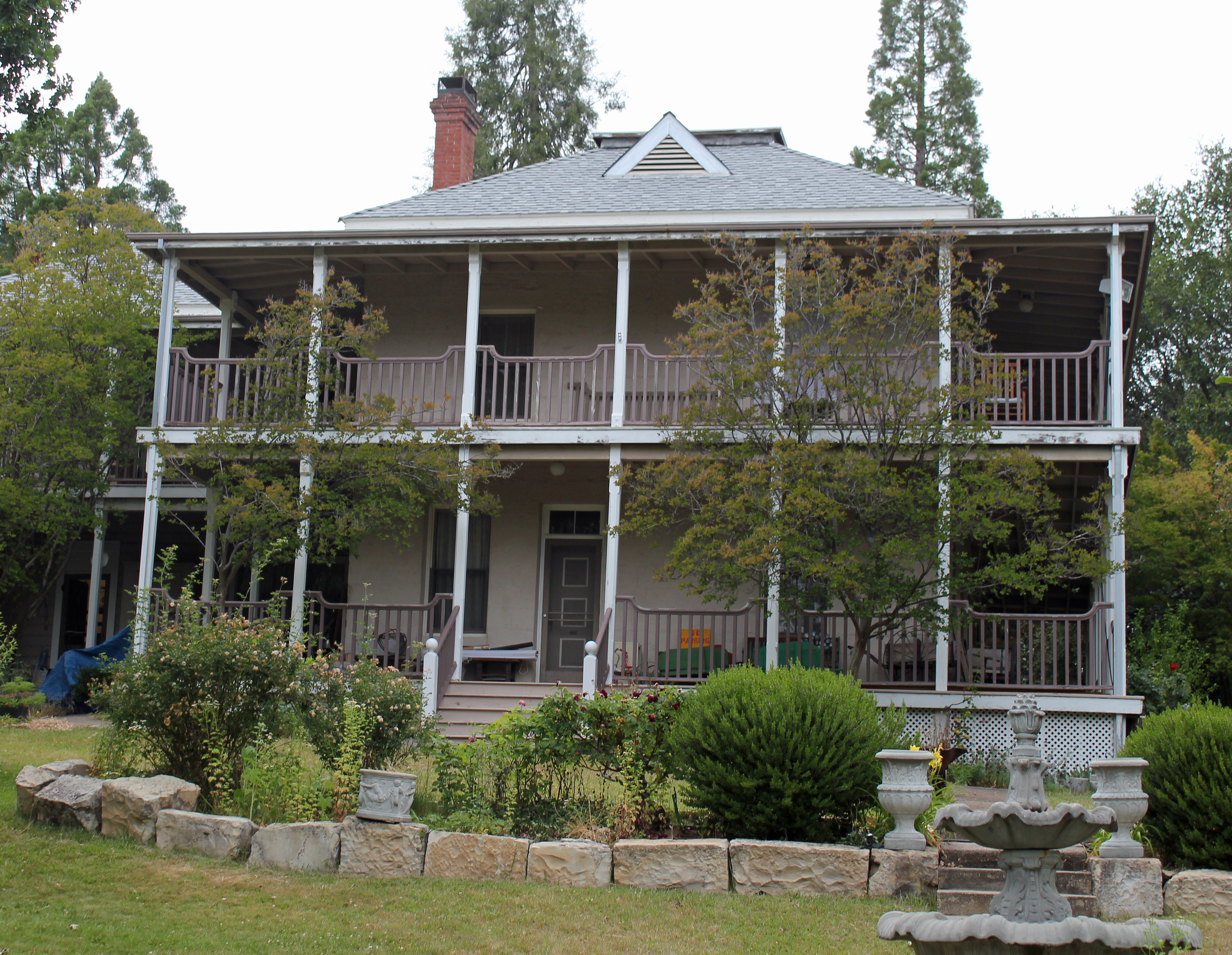
- The mansion in 2014.

- Location within California Location within the United States
- Location: 1103 Bush St., Angels Camp, California
- Coordinates: 38°4′16″N 120°32′32″W
- Area: 0.8 acres (0.32 ha)
- Built: 1882
- Architectural style: Federal
- NRHP reference No.: 84000764
- Added to NRHP: May 31, 1984

The Utica Mansion is a historic house located at 1048 Utica Ln. in Angels Camp, California. Built in 1882, the house was originally a two-story stone building designed in the Federal style. Robert Leeper, then owner of the Utica Mine, built the house next to the Utica Mill. Leeper sold the mine to C. D. Lane in 1884; he sold the house to Lane four years later. Lane and two other investors began to buy up mining claims in Angels Camp, and their enterprise soon became profitable. With his investment earnings, Lane began to expand the Utica Mansion. Lane added a two-story addition to the west and north sides of the house and a veranda on the other two sides. He also improved the interior furnishings by adding new wallpaper and fireplaces with English tiles, repainting the woodwork, adding gold moldings to hanging pictures, and installing Axminster carpets. Lane lived in the house until 1895, when he left to pursue an investment in Alaskan mining.

The Utica Mansion was added to the National Register of Historic Places on May 31, 1984.
