= John J. Snyder House =

Historic house in California, United States

- U.S. National Register of Historic Places
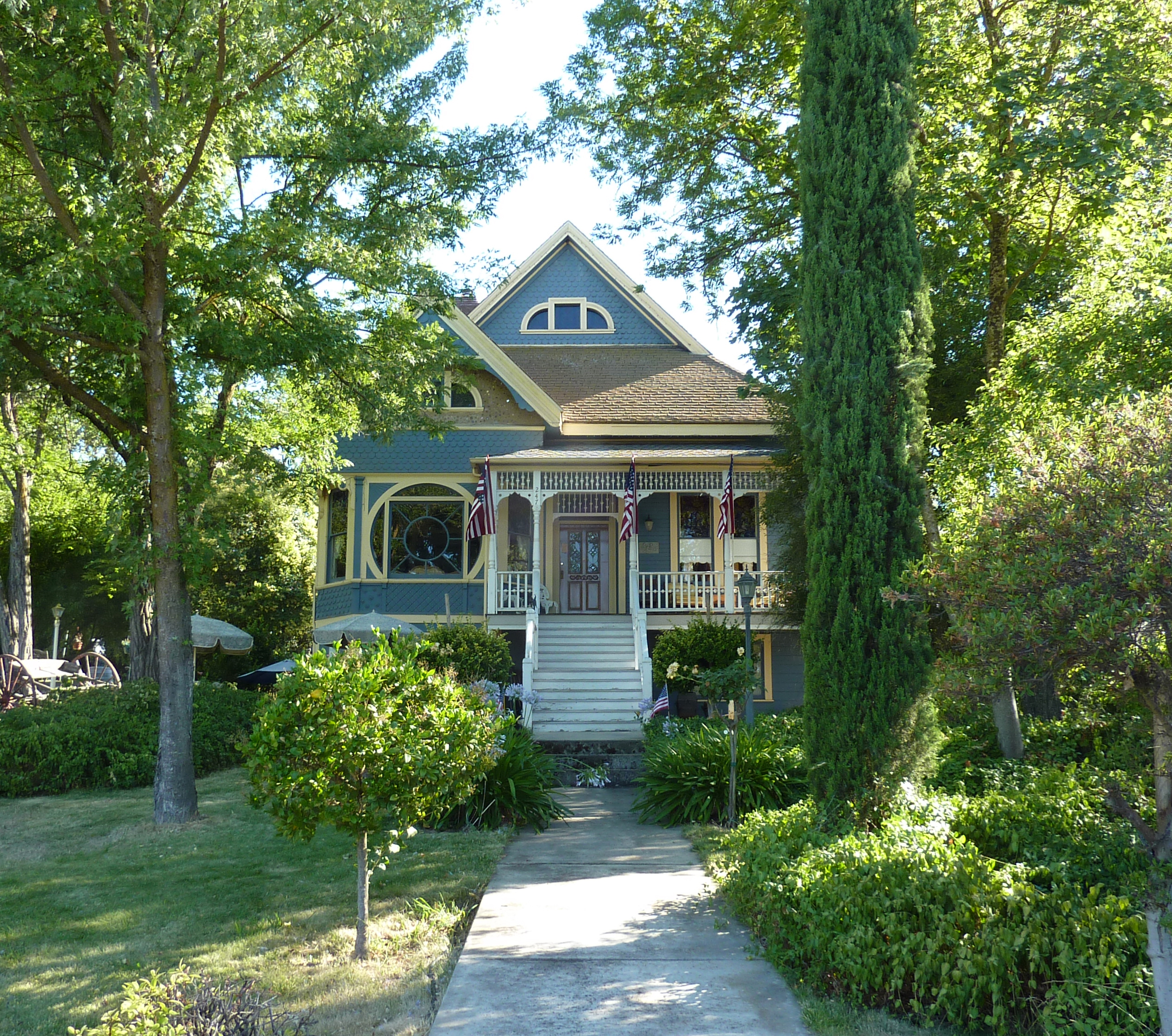

- Location within California Location within the United States
- Location: 247 W. St. Charles St., San Andreas, California
- Coordinates: 38°11′51″N 120°41′6″W
- Area: 1.2 acres (0.49 ha)
- Built: 1895
- Architectural style: Queen Anne
- NRHP reference No.: 84000760
- Added to NRHP: August 2, 1984

The John J. Snyder House is a historic house located at 247 W. St. Charles Street in San Andreas, California. Built in 1895, the house was designed in the Queen Anne style; it has been called "one of the largest and finest" houses in the style in Calaveras County. The front of the house has a raised central entrance with a porch; the porch's frieze is made up of turned spindles. A slanted bay with a large circular window is situated next to the entrance. The house has a gablet roof with a smaller gable over the front bay; the small gable includes a fan-shaped window surrounded by a roughcast infill decorated with colored glass and stones.

John J. Snyder, the house's first owner, was an early settler of San Andreas who later became a district attorney in the area. Snyder lived in the house until his 1899 death. Snyder's wife Elizabeth lived in the house until 1938, after which the house became a rental property.

The house was added to the National Register of Historic Places on August 2, 1984.
