= Burge Plantation =

Historic house in Georgia, United States

- Burge Farm
- U.S. National Register of Historic Places
- U.S. Historic district
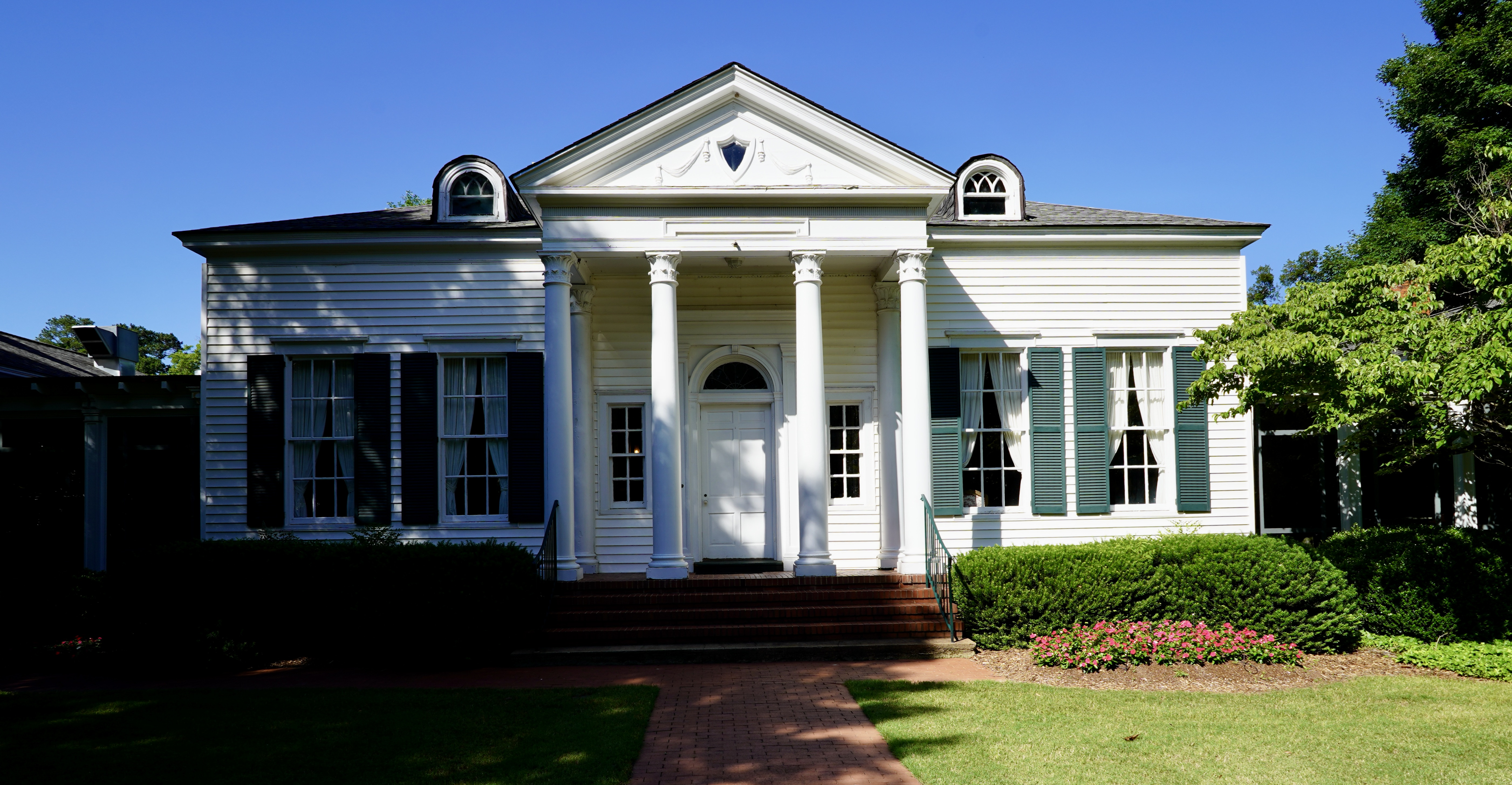

- Location within Georgia Location within the United States
- Nearest city: Newborn, Georgia
- Coordinates: 33.54629°N 83.72962°W
- Area: 603.3 acres (244.1 ha)
- Built: 1830
- Architect: Merritt J. Morehouse
- Architectural style: Classical Revival
- NRHP reference No.: 00000467
- Added to NRHP: May 11, 2000

The Burge Plantation, also known as the Burge Farm, is a historic farm estate in Newborn, Georgia. It was added to the National Register of Historic Places on May 11, 2000. It is generally bounded by GA 142, Cook Road, Morehouse Road and Sewell Road.

Wiley Burge purchased the property in 1809 and farmed it with enslaved Africans. His son Thomas took over and his wife, Dolly Sumner (Lunt) Burge (a native of Maine and from an abolitionist family) kept a journal from 1848 through 1879. Four sisters who were enslaved married and raised their children, also slaves, at Burge. Those who were enslaved at Burge were members of three intact families (one sister died, and her husband married the fourth sister). he journal, including information about these families, has been published and included in the series Southern Voices from the Past: Women’s Letters, Diaries, and Writings. It has also been depicted in Sherman's March (2007 film) for its depictions of the arrival of General Tecumseh Sherman's army on the property during the American Civil War. The site is now a private club and part of the Covington Historic Homes Tour.

== See also ==
- National Register of Historic Places listings in Newton County, Georgia
