= Copperopolis, California =

Copperopolis
- census-designated place
- Location in Calaveras County and the state of California

- Location in the United States
- Coordinates: 37°58′52″N 120°38′31″W
- Country: United States
- State: California
- County: Calaveras

Area
  - Total: 15.61 sq mi (40.44 km^{2})
  - Land: 15.59 sq mi (40.38 km^{2})
  - Water: 0.023 sq mi (0.06 km^{2}) 0.16%
- Elevation: 997 ft (304 m)

Population (2020)
  - Total: 3,400
  - Density: 218.1/sq mi (84.21/km^{2})
- Time zone: UTC-8 (Pacific (PST))
  - Summer (DST): UTC-7 (PDT)
- ZIP code: 95228
- Area code: 209
- FIPS code: 06-16210
- GNIS feature IDs: 1655921, 2407658

California Historical Landmark
- Reference no.: 296

Copperopolis is an unincorporated town and census-designated place (CDP) in Calaveras County, California, United States. The population was 3,400 at the 2020 census, down from 3,671 at the 2010 census. The town is located along State Route 4 and is registered as California Historical Landmark #296.

== History ==
Unlike most of the mining towns in the Calaveras County, Copperopolis' claim to fame is not gold, but copper. It was founded in 1860 by William K. Reed, Dr. Allen Blatchly, and Thomas McCarty, at the site of the second major discovery of copper ore in the region (the first was nearby Telegraph City).

William K. Reed and Thomas McCarty founded the Union Copper Mine (and later the Keystone & Empire mines). In 1862, Reed sold out his interest in the mines and built a toll road from Copperopolis through Telegraph City. It connected with a road running westerly into Stockton. This road was called "Reeds Turnpike" and remained a toll road until 1865. Copperopolis was on the main stage road from Sonora to Sacramento.

The town grew rapidly, as the need for copper during the Civil War for material was great. The copper was sent to Stockton and then to San Francisco, where it was loaded onto ships and taken around Cape Horn before finally arriving in smelters on the East Coast.

After the war ended, mining and shipping copper proved too expensive and the population dwindled as the mines closed. However, a Boston company purchased the mines in the 1880s and mining operations resumed. The town went through boom periods during the two World Wars, when demand for copper went up again. By the time the mines closed in 1946, according to the U.S. Bureau of Mines, they had produced 72,598,883 pounds of copper worth over $12 million (equivalent to $198,000,000 in 2025). No copper mining has been done since.

The first post office was established in 1861.

Copperopolis has four buildings listed on the National Register of Historic Places:

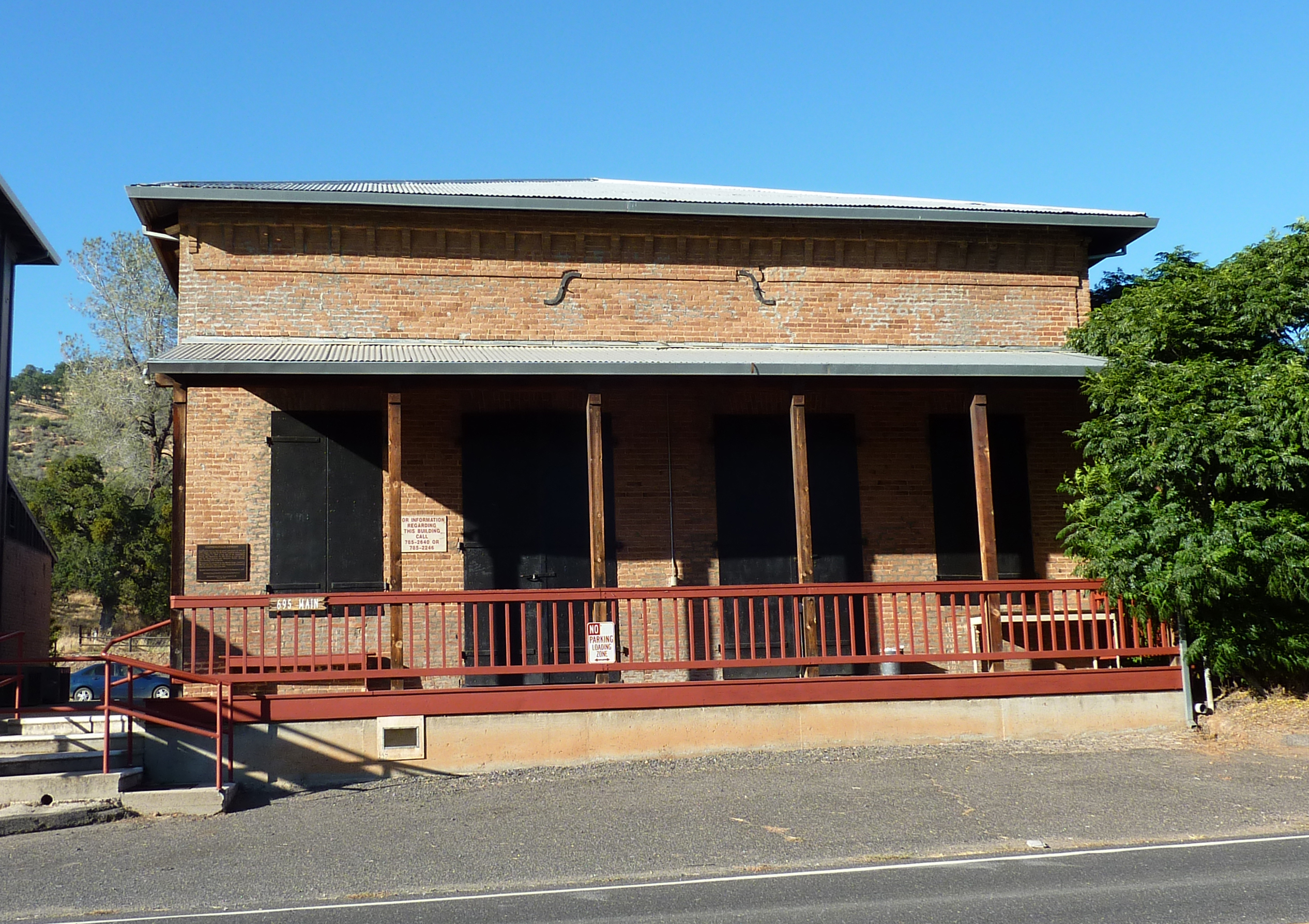
Copperopolis Armory

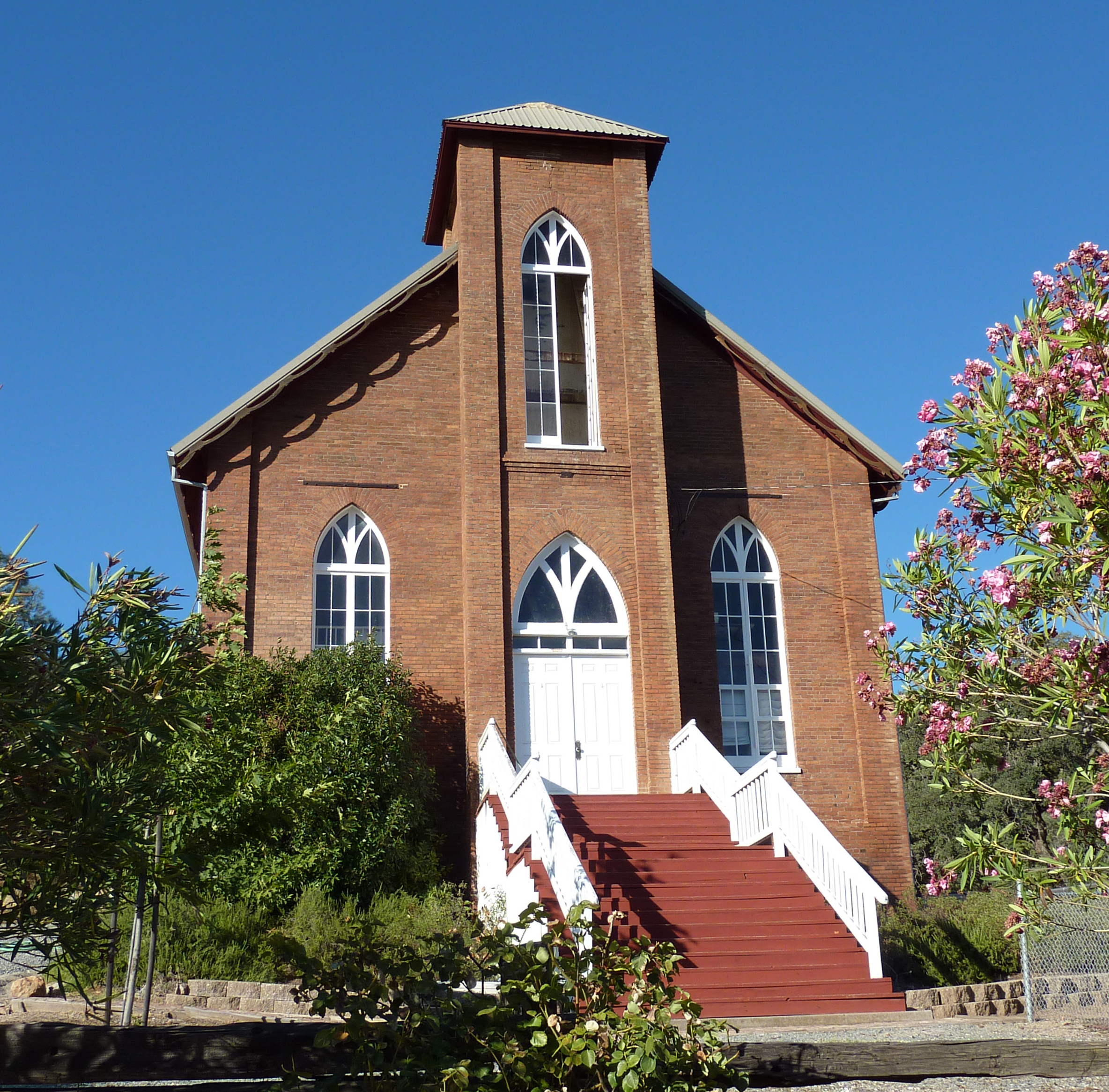
Copperopolis Congregational Church

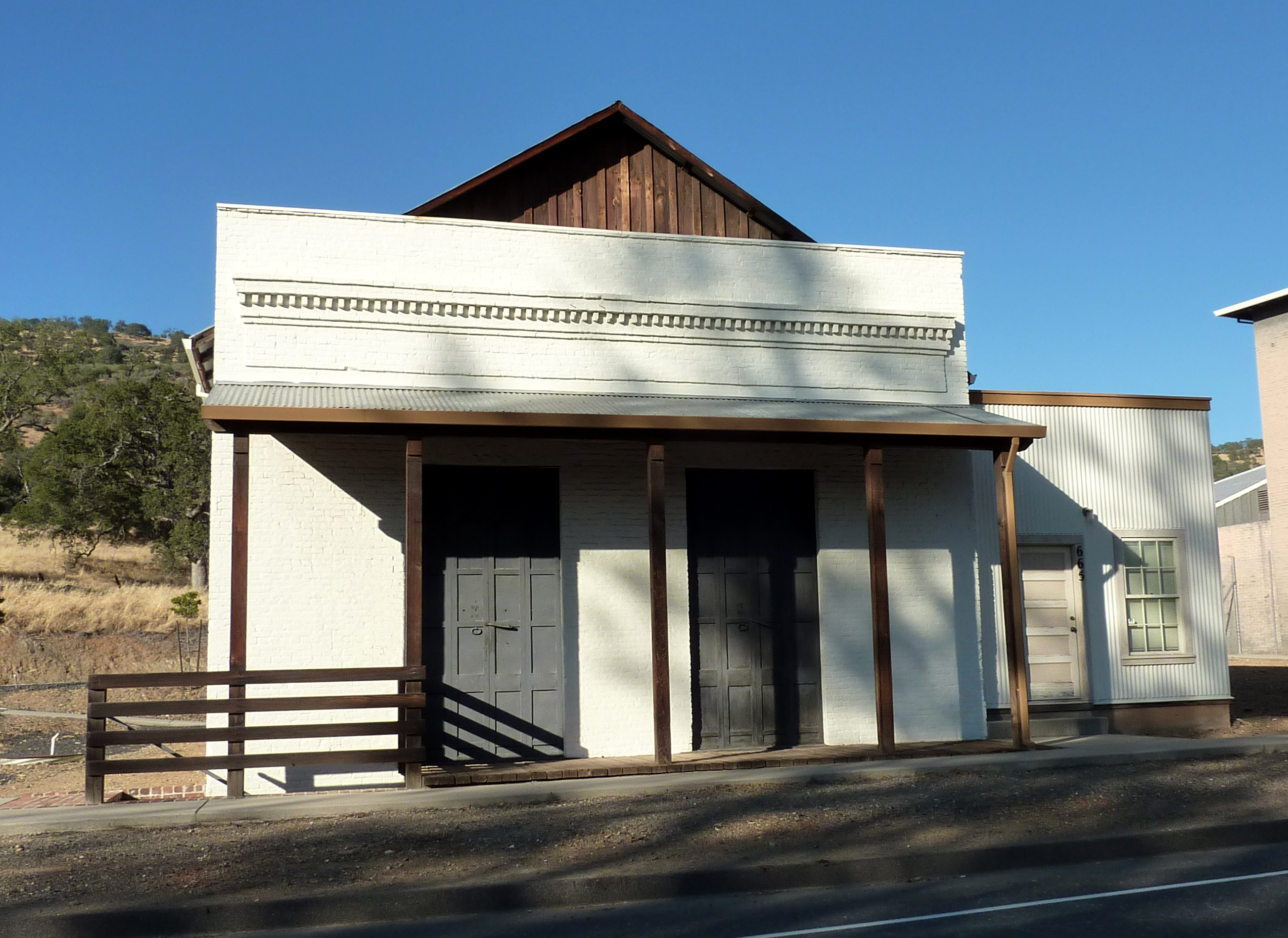
Honigsberger Store

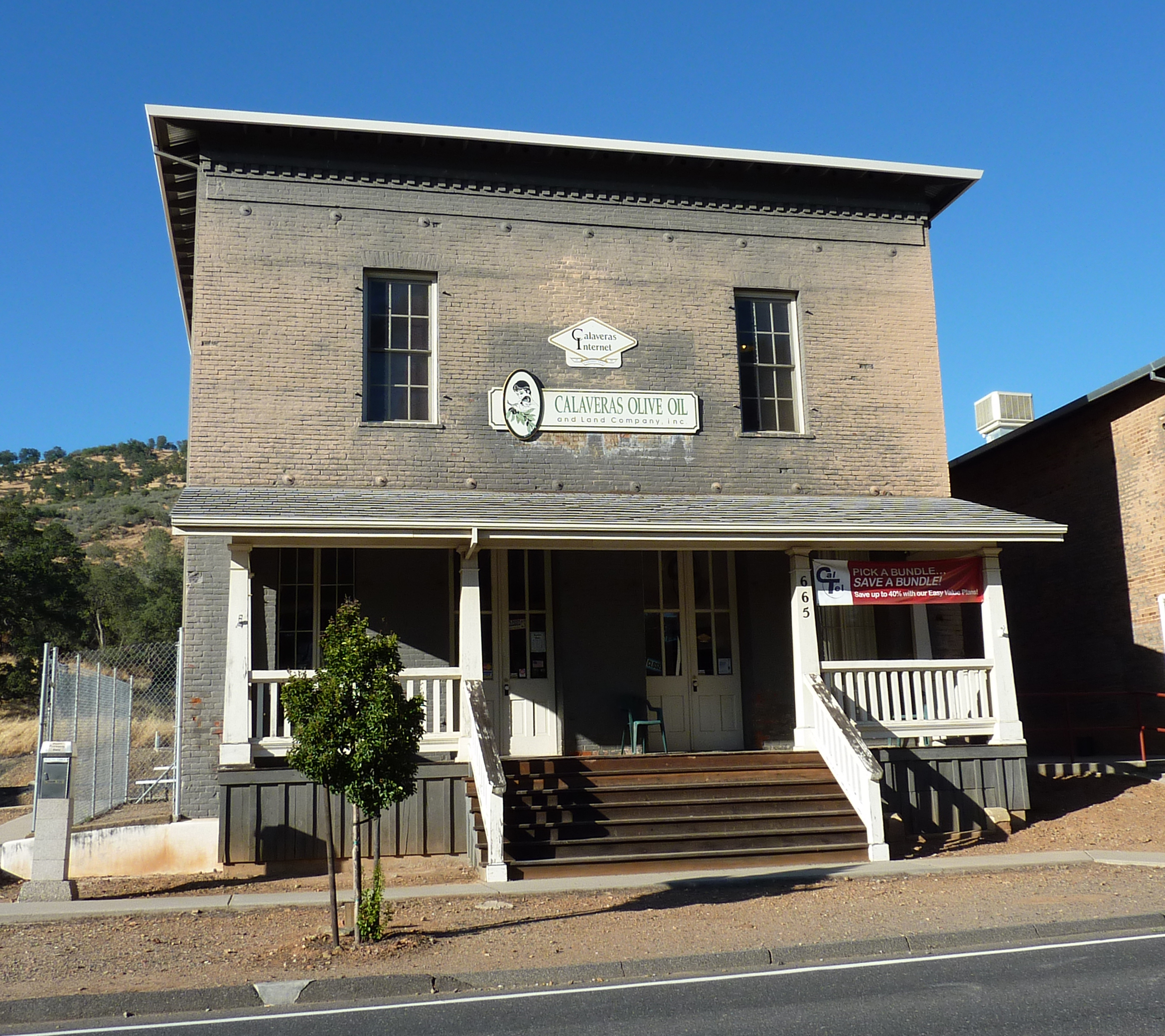
Reed's Store

== Geography ==
According to the United States Census Bureau, the CDP has a total area of 15.6 square miles (40 km^{2}), of which less than 1 percent is water.

== Climate ==
Copperopolis has a hot-summer Mediterranean climate (Köppen climate classification Csa).

There are cool winters during which intense rainfall is broken by weeks of cool, sunny weather. It has hot, dry summers with no rainfall in July and August.

Snow is rare in Copperopolis, averaging only 0.2 inches or 0.51 centimetres per year, entirely in winter months.

Climate data for Copperopolis, California
Month	Jan	Feb	Mar	Apr	May	Jun	Jul	Aug	Sep	Oct	Nov	Dec	Year
Mean daily maximum °F (°C)	55.3 (12.9)	59.9 (15.5)	64.3 (17.9)	70.1 (21.2)	79.3 (26.3)	88.5 (31.4)	95.8 (35.4)	94.4 (34.7)	88.8 (31.6)	78.4 (25.8)	64.1 (17.8)	55.5 (13.1)	74.5 (23.6)
Daily mean °F (°C)	45.9 (7.7)	49.3 (9.6)	53.2 (11.8)	56.1 (13.4)	62.2 (16.8)	72.5 (22.5)	79.0 (26.1)	77.8 (25.4)	72.9 (22.7)	64.3 (17.9)	53.2 (11.8)	46.1 (7.8)	61.4 (16.3)
Mean daily minimum °F (°C)	36.5 (2.5)	38.7 (3.7)	42.1 (5.6)	45.1 (7.3)	50.8 (10.4)	56.5 (13.6)	61.9 (16.6)	61.1 (16.2)	56.9 (13.8)	50.2 (10.1)	42.2 (5.7)	36.6 (2.6)	48.2 (9.0)
Record low °F (°C)	21 (−6)	20 (−7)	24 (−4)	28 (−2)	31 (−1)	37 (3)	35 (2)	41 (5)	39 (4)	32 (0)	28 (−2)	17 (−8)	17 (−8)
Average precipitation inches (mm)	5.4 (140)	4.8 (120)	4.5 (110)	2.4 (61)	1.3 (33)	0.3 (7.6)	0 (0)	0 (0)	0.4 (10)	1.5 (38)	3.2 (81)	4.7 (120)	28.5 (720)
Average snowfall inches (cm)	0 (0)	0.2 (0.51)	0 (0)	0 (0)	0 (0)	0 (0)	0 (0)	0 (0)	0 (0)	0 (0)	0 (0)	0 (0)	0.2 (0.51)
Source: Bestplaces.net

== Demographics ==
Historical population
Census	Pop.	Note	%±
2000	2,363		—
2010	3,671		55.4%
2020	3,400		−7.4%
U.S. Decennial Census; 1850–1870 1880-1890; 1900 1910 1920; 1930 1940 1950; 1960 1970 1980; 1990 2000 2010

Copperopolis first appeared as a census designated place in the 2000 U.S. census.

=== Racial and ethnic composition ===
Copperopolis CDP, California – Racial and ethnic composition Note: the US Census treats Hispanic/Latino as an ethnic category. This table excludes Latinos from the racial categories and assigns them to a separate category. Hispanics/Latinos may be of any race.
Race / Ethnicity (NH = Non-Hispanic)	Pop 2000	Pop 2010	Pop 2020	% 2000	% 2010	% 2020
White alone (NH)	2,001	3,031	2,561	84.68%	82.57%	75.32%
Black or African American alone (NH)	16	28	30	0.68%	0.76%	0.88%
Native American or Alaska Native alone (NH)	30	24	17	1.27%	0.65%	0.50%
Asian alone (NH)	44	32	58	1.86%	0.87%	1.71%
Native Hawaiian or Pacific Islander alone (NH)	4	9	6	0.17%	0.25%	0.18%
Other race alone (NH)	0	1	15	0.00%	0.03%	0.44%
Mixed race or Multiracial (NH)	66	92	226	2.79%	2.51%	6.65%
Hispanic or Latino (any race)	202	454	487	8.55%	12.37%	14.32%
Total	2,363	3,671	3,400	100.00%	100.00%	100.00%

=== 2020 census ===
As of the 2020 census, Copperopolis had a population of 3,400. The population density was 218.1 inhabitants per square mile (84.2/km^{2}). The racial makeup of Copperopolis was 80.0% White, 1.0% African American, 1.3% Native American, 1.8% Asian, 0.2% Pacific Islander, 3.9% from other races, and 11.8% from two or more races. Hispanic or Latino people of any race were 14.3% of the population.

The whole population lived in households. There were 1,399 households, out of which 24.2% included children under the age of 18, 57.5% were married-couple households, 7.4% were cohabiting couple households, 18.3% had a female householder with no partner present, and 16.8% had a male householder with no partner present. 22.1% of households were one person, and 11.6% were one person aged 65 or older. There were 989 families (70.7% of all households), and the average household size was 2.43.

The age distribution was 18.2% under the age of 18, 5.1% aged 18 to 24, 20.6% aged 25 to 44, 30.1% aged 45 to 64, and 25.9% who were 65 years of age or older. The median age was 51.1 years. For every 100 females, there were 98.5 males, and for every 100 females age 18 and over, there were 100.0 males age 18 and over. 0.0% of residents lived in urban areas, while 100.0% lived in rural areas.

There were 1,761 housing units at an average density of 113.0 units per square mile (43.6 units/km^{2}), of which 1,399 (79.4%) were occupied. Of occupied units, 80.9% were owner-occupied and 19.1% were occupied by renters. Of all housing units, 20.6% were vacant. The homeowner vacancy rate was 1.9% and the rental vacancy rate was 10.7%.

=== Income and poverty ===
In 2023, the US Census Bureau estimated that the median household income was $107,643, and the per capita income was $48,733. About 6.6% of families and 6.2% of the population were below the poverty line.

== Politics ==
In the state legislature, Copperopolis is in the 4th senatorial district, represented by Republican Marie Alvarado-Gil, and is divided between the 8th Assembly district, represented by Republican David Tangipa and the 9th Assembly district, represented by Republican Heath Flora. Federally, Copperopolis is in California's 5th congressional district, represented by Republican Tom McClintock.

== Literature ==
Copperopolis is near Tuttletown, which has a shack on Jack Ass Hill, where Mark Twain is supposed to have written one of his most famous works, "The Celebrated Jumping Frog of Calaveras County". Author K. Martin Gardner expounds on this literary history, and Twain's friendship with renowned scientist of the time, Nikola Tesla, in his novel Copperopolis.
