= Thorn House (San Andreas, California) =

Historic house in California, United States

- U.S. National Register of Historic Places
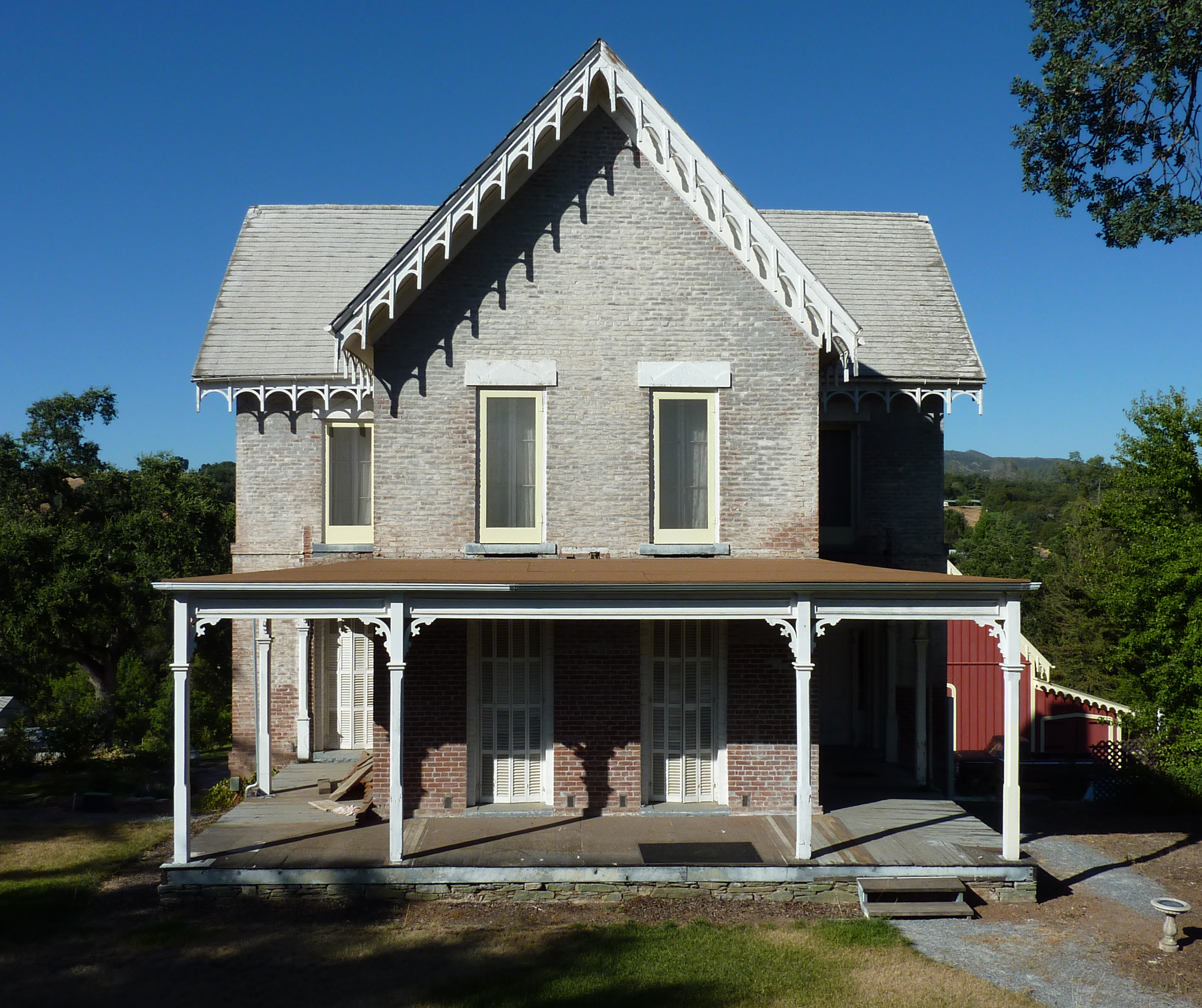

- Location within California Location within the United States
- Location: 87 E. St. Charles St., San Andreas, California
- Coordinates: 38°11′43″N 120°40′40″W
- Area: 2 acres (0.81 ha)
- Built: c. 1857
- Built by: Thorn, Benjamin K.
- Architectural style: Gothic Revival, Carpenter Gothic
- NRHP reference No.: 72000222
- Added to NRHP: February 23, 1972

The Thorn House is a historic house located at 87 E. St. Charles Street in San Andreas, California. The house, which was built in 1861, was designed in the Carpenter Gothic style. The design features decorative bargeboards, a steeply sloping roof, a porch with a second floor veranda, and nine French doors opening to the outside. The brick used to build the house was imported from Stockton. The house also includes a landscaped garden covering nearly 3 acres (1.2 ha). Calaveras County Sheriff Ben Thorn built the house; Thorn was well known for capturing outlaws such as Black Bart, and historian Richard Coke Wood called him "one of the greatest men in the history of Calaveras County".

The Thorn House was added to the National Register of Historic Places on February 23, 1972.
