= Pioneer Cemetery (San Andreas, California) =

Defunct pioneer cemetery in San Andreas, California (c. 1851–?)

- Interactive map of Pioneer Cemetery

Details
- Established: c. 1851
- Location: 2974 CA-12, San Andreas, Calaveras County, California
- Country: United States
- Coordinates: 38.20857°N 120.70787°W
- Type: Public
- No. of graves: 28
- Find a Grave: Pioneer Cemetery

California Historical Landmark
- Reference no.: 271

The Pioneer Cemetery, formerly known as the North Branch Cemetery, is a defunct cemetery established in c. 1851, and located along California State Route 12 in San Andreas, Calaveras County, California. It is the oldest known cemetery in Calaveras County.

The site is listed as a California Historical Landmark (number 271), by the California Office of Historic Preservation since September 3, 1937.

== History ==
The cemetery was established in c. 1851 and was originally named the North Branch Cemetery, named after a town of North Branch that once existed near the cemetery. Most of the graves in Pioneer Cemetery are unmarked.

Many of the graves from the former Poverty Bar Cemetery in Poverty Bar, Amador County were reinterred in the Pioneer Cemetery in 1962, while the East Bay Municipal Utility District worked on building Camanche Reservoir. A historic plaque marks the graves for the reinterred.

== See also ==
- California Historical Landmarks in Calaveras County
- List of cemeteries in California
- Pioneer cemetery, list of early cemeteries
