= Camanche, California =

Camanche Limerick Clay's Bar
- Former settlement
- Location in California
- Coordinates: 38°12′48″N 120°56′07″W
- Country: United States
- State: California
- County: Calaveras
- Elevation: 220 ft (67 m)

California Historical Landmark
- Reference no.: 254

Camanche (originally Limerick; also, Clay's Bar) is a former settlement in Calaveras County, California, United States. Located at an elevation of 220 feet (67 m), the town was once called Limerick, before it was renamed to Camanche in 1849. The settlement of Camanche is now submerged under Camanche Reservoir.

== History ==
In 1849, it was renamed Camanche (after Camanche, Iowa). Gold mining at nearby Cat Camp, Poverty Bar, and Sand Hill brought its population to a peak of 1,500. Mokelumne River water was brought in by Lancha Plana and Poverty Bar Ditch. A fire on June 21, 1873, destroyed Camanche's large Chinatown. Buhach, an insect powder made from a plant, was manufactured on the nearby Hill Ranch. Camanche is now inundated by Camanche Reservoir.

A post office was opened in Clay's Bar in 1861 and renamed Camanche in 1864 before closing in 1886; it was re-established in 1887 and closed for good in 1962.

The settlement is registered as California Historical Landmark #254.

== See also ==
- List of ghost towns in California
