= Salem Camp Ground =

Historic camp ground in the US state of Georgia

- U.S. National Register of Historic Places
- U.S. Historic district
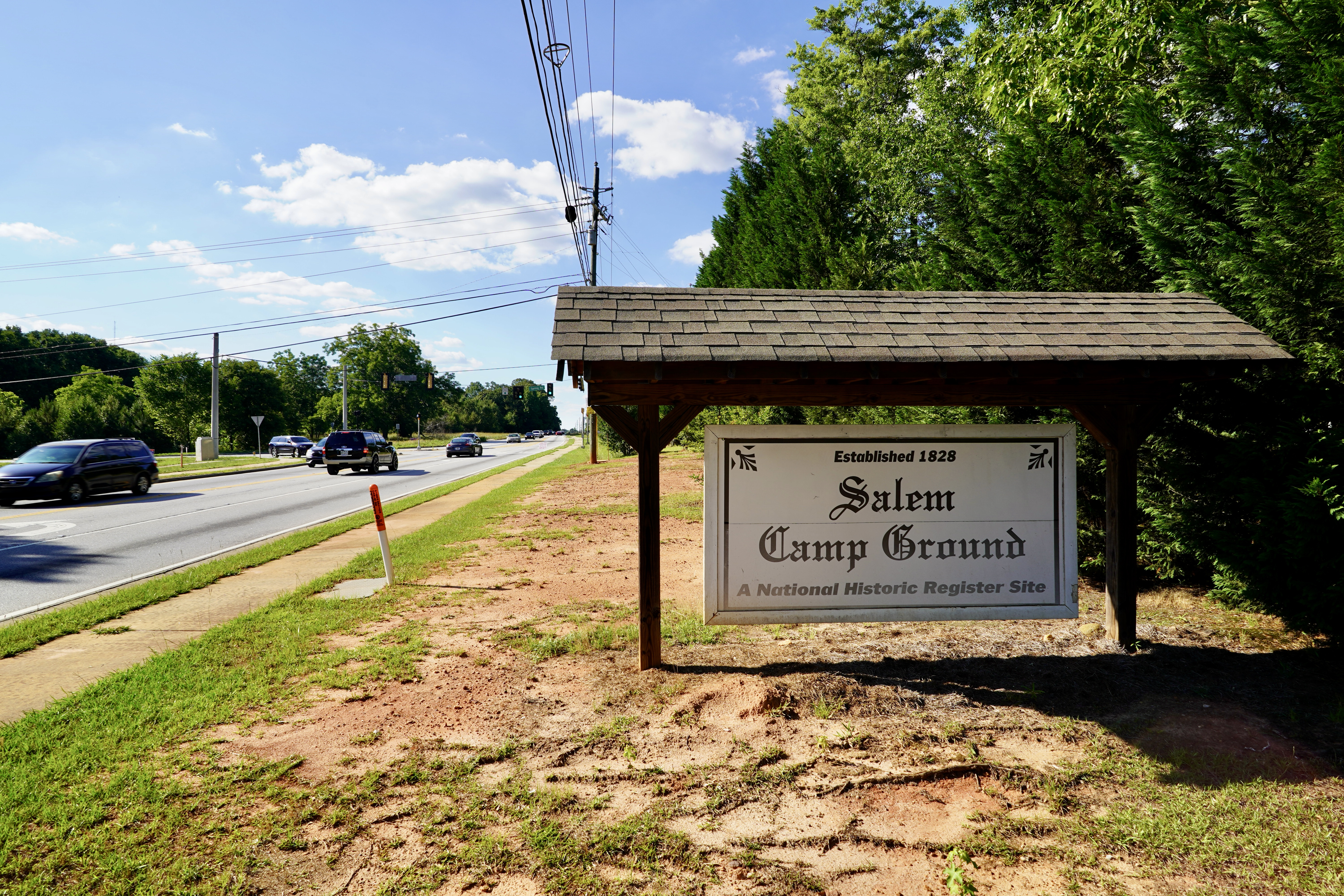
- Salem Camp Ground

- Location within Georgia
- Location: 3940 Salem Rd., Covington, Georgia
- Coordinates: 33.58576°N 83.9667°W
- Area: 63.4 acres (25.7 ha)
- Built: 1940
- NRHP reference No.: 98000175
- Added to NRHP: March 5, 1998

Salem Camp Ground is a historic camp meeting site in Covington, Georgia. It was established in 1828. It was added to the National Register of Historic Places on March 5, 1998. It is located at 3940 Salem Road.

The interdenominational camp offers activities for children and adults. It has camper hook ups and a hotel and is intended as a place for peace, worship, reunion, and spiritual renewal.

The listing includes 33 contributing resources.

== See also ==
- National Register of Historic Places listings in Newton County, Georgia
