= Brick Store (Covington, Georgia) =

- U.S. National Register of Historic Places
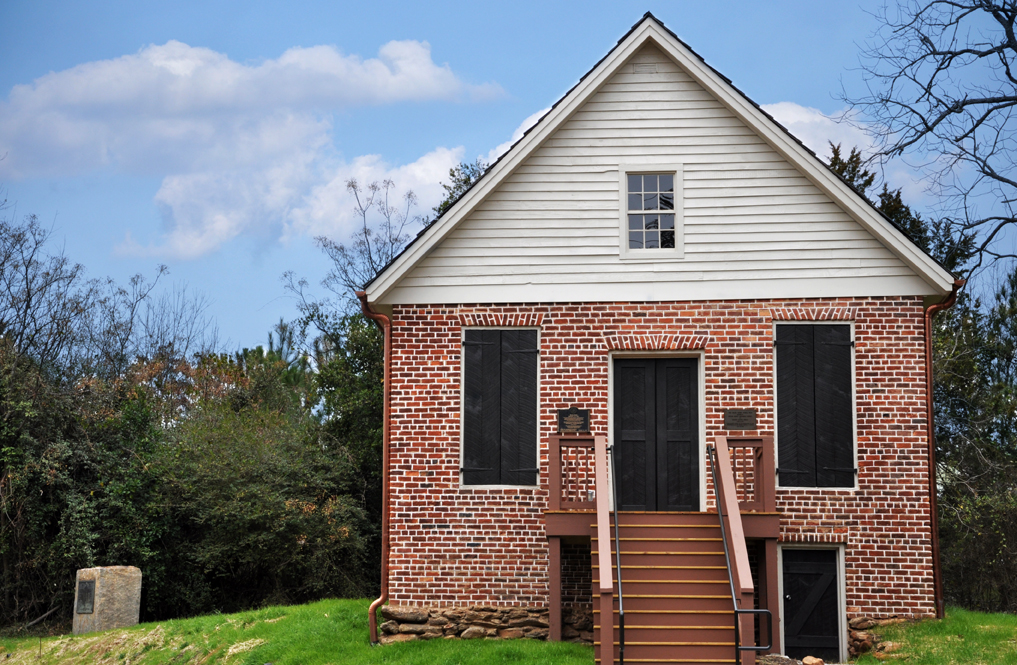

- Location within Georgia Location within the United States
- Nearest city: Covington, Georgia
- Coordinates: 33°36′4″N 83°44′42″W
- Area: 0.1 acres (0.040 ha)
- Built: 1821
- NRHP reference No.: 09000186
- Added to NRHP: April 9, 2009

Brick Store is a historic building in Covington, Georgia. It was built in 1821 and served as a focus point for the community, also known as Sun Up, Georgia, Mt. Pleasant, Georgia or Brick Store, Georgia. It has been a general store, stage coach stop, post office, school house, courtroom, jail and residence for Martin Kolb. The first session of Newton County Superior Court was held at the Brick Store. The building was added to the National Register of Historic Places on April 9, 2009. The building is owned by the Trustees of the Newton County Historical Society. It is located on U.S. Route 278 at Old Social Circle Road.

The site includes a tablet from 1933 commemorating the Stage Coach Crossroads, a plaque commemorating the building's donation by Charles M. Jordan of the building to the Newton County Historical Society in 1971 and a plaque from the landmarks commission dated 1990.

== See also ==
- National Register of Historic Places listings in Newton County, Georgia
