= Old Brick Store =

Historic building in Delaware, US

- U.S. National Register of Historic Places
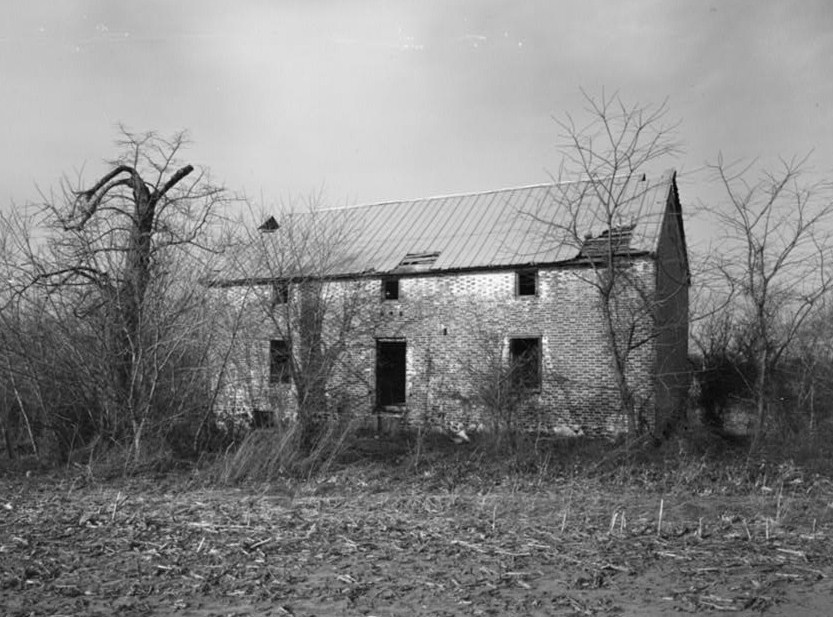
- Old Brick Store, HABS Photo, April 1982

- Location within Delaware Location within the United States
- Location: 670 Brick Store Landing Road, near Smyrna, Delaware
- Coordinates: 39.321999°N 75.572338°W
- Area: 1 acre (0.40 ha)
- Built: c. 1764
- NRHP reference No.: 73000541
- Added to NRHP: August 14, 1973

Old Brick Store, also known as the Old Brick Hotel and The Granary, is a historic commercial building located near Smyrna in New Castle County, Delaware, United States. It was built about 1764, and is a two- to three-story, three bay brick building. The building marks the location of what may have been a grain shipping center for southern New Castle County.

It was listed on the National Register of Historic Places in 1973.
