= Douglas Flat School =

- U.S. National Register of Historic Places
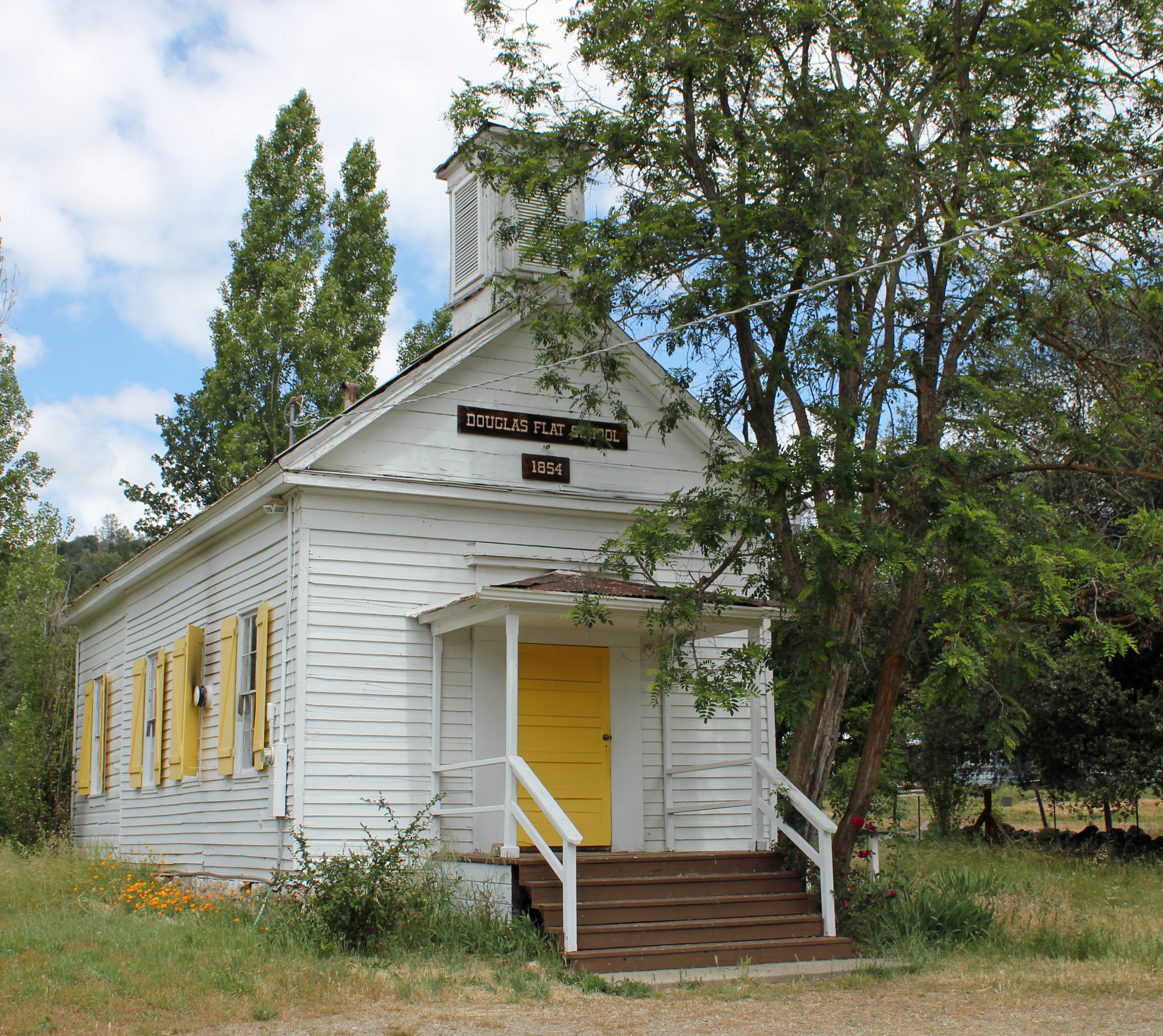
- The school in 2014.

- Location within California Location within the United States
- Location: NE of Vallecito on SR 4, Douglas Flat, California
- Coordinates: 38°07′02″N 120°27′16″W
- Area: 3 acres (1.2 ha)
- Built: 1856
- Architectural style: Vernacular Greek Revival
- NRHP reference No.: 73000397
- Added to NRHP: May 24, 1973

The Douglas Flat School is a historic school building on California State Route 4 in Douglas Flat, California. The school was built in 1854 to serve miners who settled in Douglas Flat during the California Gold Rush; the school site was the only place in Douglas Flat where mining was not permitted, as the mining rights on the property were reserved for the first teachers. The building was designed in a vernacular Greek Revival style, a popular style during the Gold Rush. The simple design of the school includes a pedimented gable in the front, an architrave set atop plain pilasters, a flat cornice, and a small belfry. The one-room schoolhouse first taught classes in 1856 and operated until 1956. It reopened in 1971 to become a kindergarten and later became a community center.

The Douglas Flat School was added to the National Register of Historic Places on May 24, 1973.
