= Sam Choy Brick Store =

- U.S. National Register of Historic Places
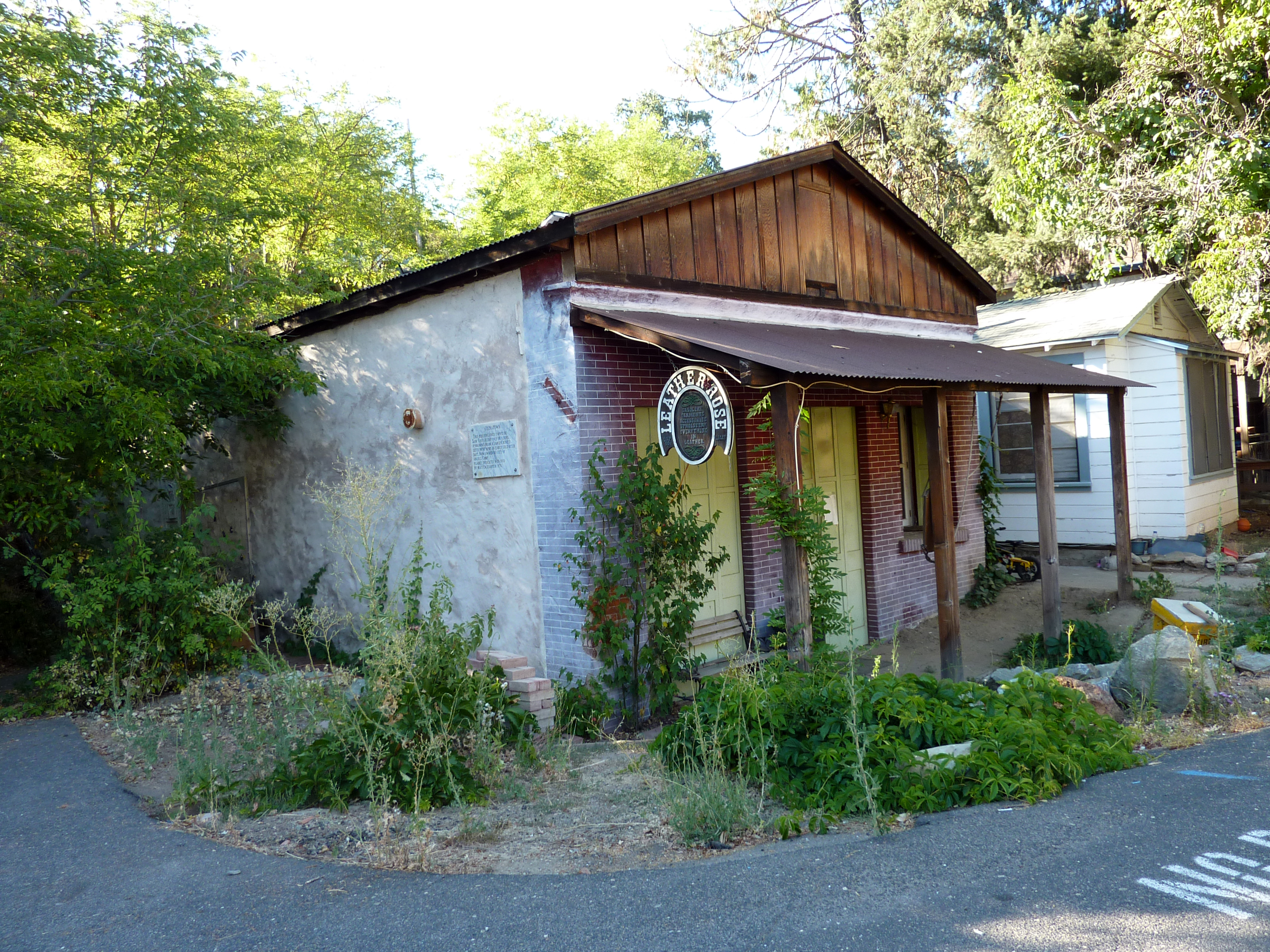

- Location within California Location within the United States
- Location: Birds Way, Angels Camp, California
- Coordinates: 38°4′9″N 120°32′18″W
- Area: 0.1 acres (0.040 ha)
- Built: 1860
- Architectural style: Classical Revival
- NRHP reference No.: 84000759
- Added to NRHP: September 20, 1984

The Sam Choy Brick Store, Angels Camp, California, is the only building remaining from a large Chinese settlement during the California gold rush. It was listed on the National Register of Historic Places in 1984.

After it served as a general store, its owner sold it to Angels Camp for use as a jail. The Sam Choy Brick Store is still owned by the city of Angels Camp.
