= Douglas Flat, California =

Unincorporated community in California, United States

Douglas Flat
- Unincorporated community Census designated place
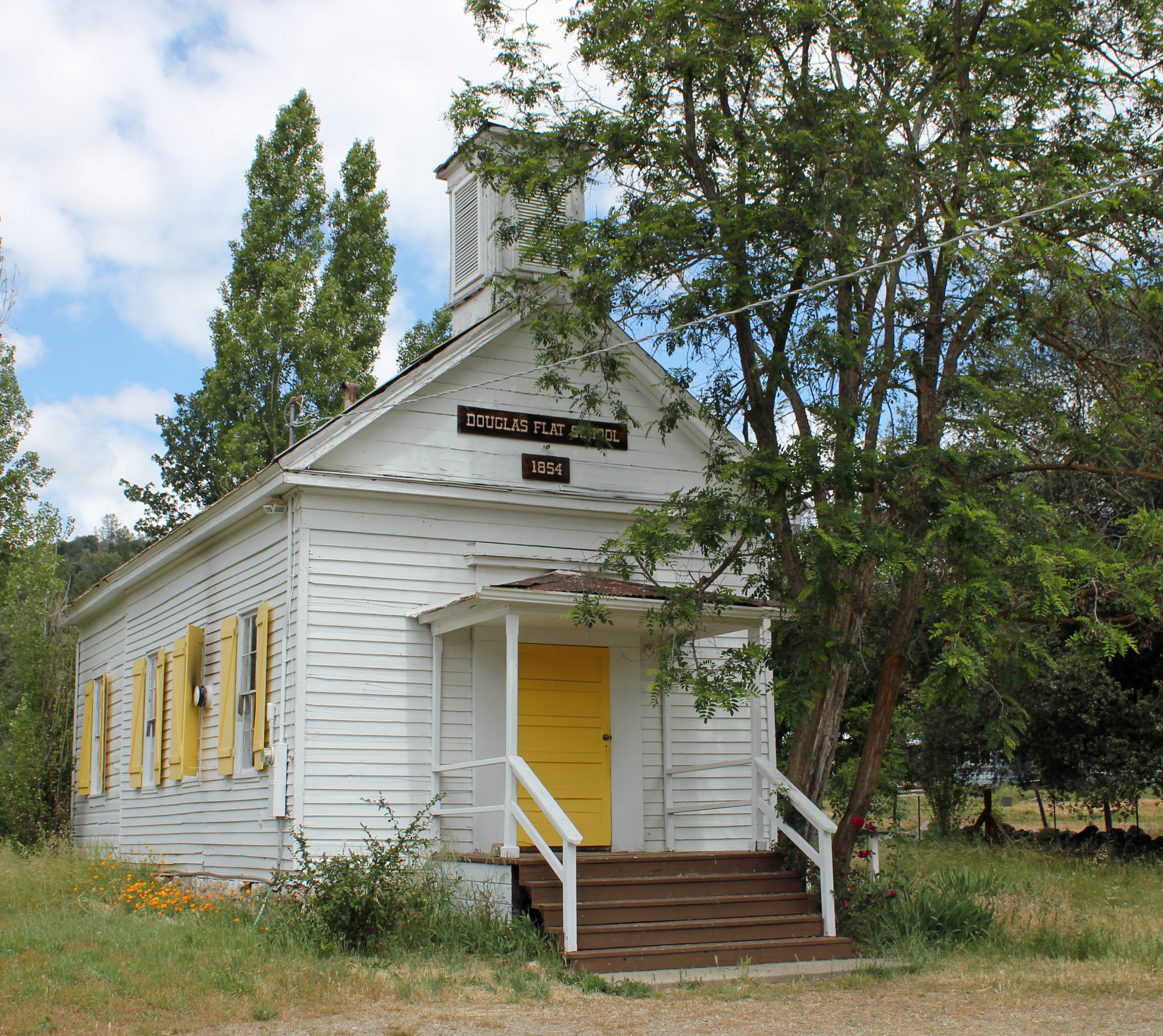
- The Douglas Flat School, built in 1854.

- Location in California Douglas Flat (the United States)
- Coordinates: 38°06′52″N 120°27′18″W
- Country: United States
- State: California
- County: Calaveras
- Elevation: 1,965 ft (599 m)

California Historical Landmark
- Reference no.: 272

Douglas Flat (formerly Douglasflat and Douglass Flat) is an unincorporated community and census designated place in Calaveras County, California, United States. It lies at an elevation of 1965 feet (599 m) and is located at 38°06′52″N 120°27′18″W. The community is served by ZIP code 95229 and area code 209.

Douglas Flat was a roaring mining camp of the early 1850s. In 1857 the Harper and Lone Star Claims produced $130,000 worth of gold. The so-called Central Hill Channel, an ancient river deposit from which vast quantities of gold have been taken, is located here.

The town today is registered as California Historical Landmark #272.

The first post office opened in 1879, and was closed for a time in 1891 before reopening. The town's name honors Tom Douglas, an 1850s merchant.

== Politics ==
In the state legislature, Douglas Flat is in the 8th senatorial district, represented by Democrat Angelique Ashby, and the 5th Assembly district, represented by Republican Joe Patterson. Federally, Douglas Flat is in California's 4th congressional district, represented by Democrat Mike Thompson.

== Demographics ==
The United States Census Bureau first delineated Douglas Flat as a census designated place in 2023.
