= National Register of Historic Places listings in Newton County, Georgia =

This is a list of properties and districts in Newton County, Georgia that are listed on the National Register of Historic Places (NRHP).

This National Park Service list is complete through NPS recent listings posted May 1, 2026.

== Current listings ==
	Name on the Register	Image	Date listed	Location	City or town	Description
1	Brick Store	Brick Store	April 9, 2009 (#09000186)	U.S. Route 278 at Old Social Circle Road; 33°36′07″N 83°44′42″W	Covington	
2	Burge Farm	Burge Farm	May 11, 2000 (#00000467)	Roughly bounded by GA 142, Cook Rd., Morehouse Rd. and Sewell Rd. 33°32′47″N 83°43′47″W	Newborn	
3	Covington Historic District		August 6, 1998 (#98000969)	Roughly Covington City S of US 278; 33°35′41″N 83°51′12″W	Covington	
4	Covington Mills and Mill Village Historic District	Covington Mills and Mill Village Historic District	April 14, 2000 (#00000370)	Roughly bounded by Wheat, Collins and Lott Sts. and, to the north, the Covington Mills pond and Creek; 33°36′19″N 83°50′50″W	Covington	
5	Floyd Street Historic District		December 4, 1974 (#74000699)	Floyd St. from Elm to W of Sockwell St. 33°35′48″N 83°51′20″W	Covington	
6	Newborn Historic District		August 6, 1998 (#98000970)	Roughly the entire city limits of Newborn City; 33°31′09″N 83°41′45″W	Newborn	
7	Newton County Courthouse	Newton County Courthouse	September 18, 1980 (#80001216)	Courthouse Sq. 33°35′49″N 83°51′37″W	Covington	
8	North Covington Historic District		May 26, 2000 (#00000526)	N. Emory and Odum Sts. and Georgia (CSX) Railroad; 33°36′26″N 83°51′48″W	Covington	
9	Orna Villa	Orna Villa	January 29, 1973 (#73000636)	1008 N. Emory St. 33°37′27″N 83°51′59″W	Oxford	
10	Oxford Historic District	Oxford Historic District	June 5, 1975 (#75000603)	College and residential district centered around Wesley St. 33°37′32″N 83°52′13″W	Oxford	
11	Porterdale Historic District		September 17, 2001 (#01000974)	Roughly the city limits of Porterdale north of Elm St. 33°34′23″N 83°53′45″W	Porterdale	
12	Salem Camp Ground	Salem Camp Ground	March 5, 1998 (#98000175)	3940 Salem Rd. 33°35′09″N 83°58′00″W	Covington	
13	Starrsville Historic District		June 26, 1998 (#98000715)	Jct. GA 213, Old Starsville and Dixie Rds. 33°31′44″N 83°48′35″W	Starrsville	
