= Hillsdale Brick Store =

Historic building in North Carolina, US

- U.S. National Register of Historic Places
- Location within North Carolina Location within the United States
- Location: NC 150 and SR 2347, Hillsdale, North Carolina
- Coordinates: 36°12′00″N 79°50′39″W
- Area: 14.2 acres (5.7 ha)
- Architectural style: Greek Revival
- NRHP reference No.: 82003459
- Added to NRHP: June 14, 1982

Hillsdale Brick Store is a historic general store building in Hillsdale, Guilford County, North Carolina. It dates to the mid 19th century and is a two-story, two-bay-by-three-bay brick building with Greek-Revival-style design elements. It has a low hipped roof. Also on the property are the contributing remnants of a log icehouse and blacksmith shop.

It was listed on the National Register of Historic Places in 1982.
