= Copperopolis Congregational Church =

Historic church in California, United States

- U.S. National Register of Historic Places
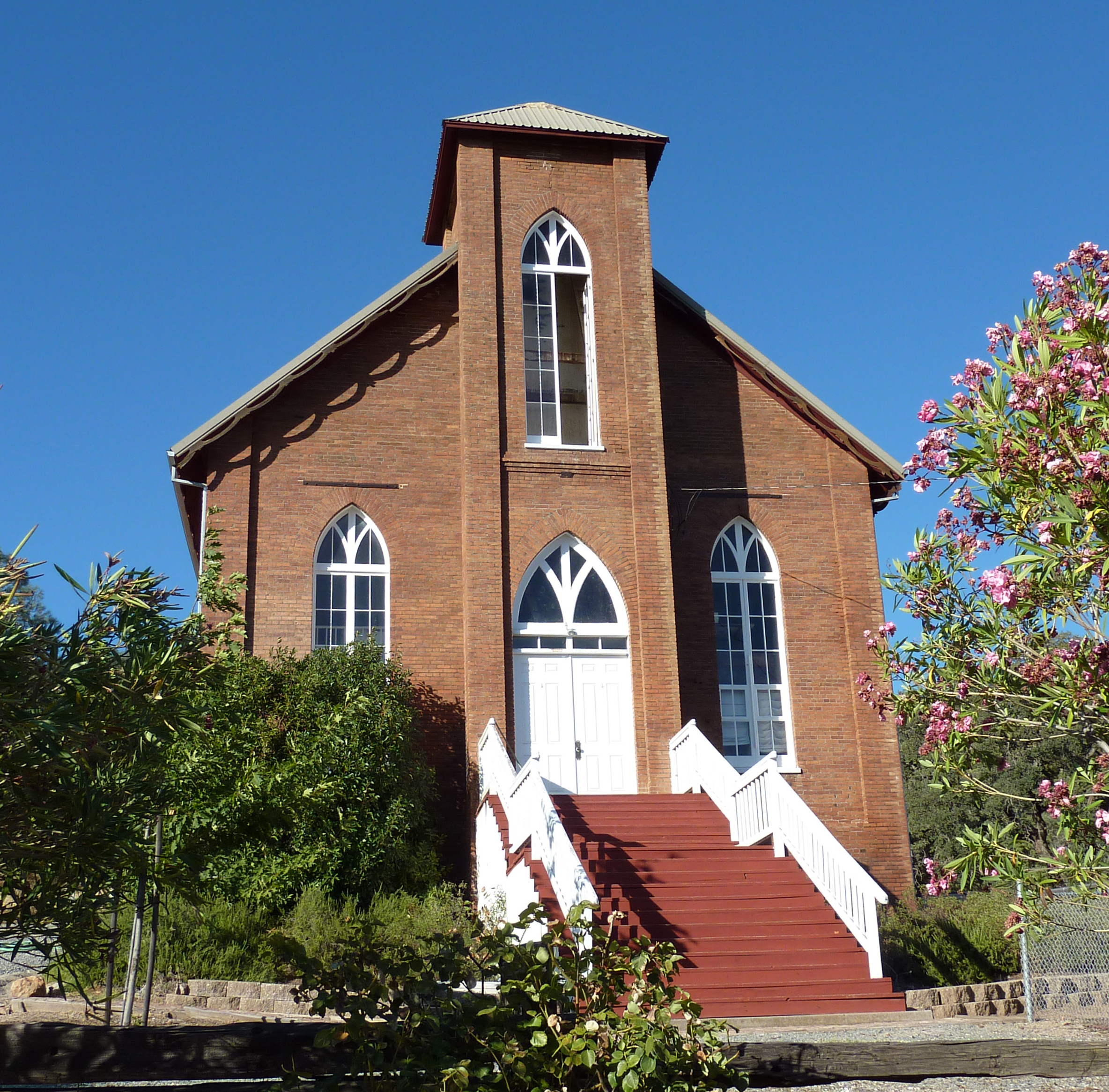

- Location within California Location within the United States
- Location: 411 Main St., Copperopolis, California
- Coordinates: 37°58′47″N 120°38′16″W
- Area: 1 acre (0.40 ha)
- Built: 1866
- Architect: Angell & Chaloner
- Architectural style: Gothic Revival
- NRHP reference No.: 97001587
- Added to NRHP: December 30, 1997

Copperopolis Congregational Church (also known as Copperopolis Community Center) is a historic church building at 411 Main Street in Copperopolis, California. The church was built in 1866 and designed in the Gothic Revival style; it is the only Gothic Revival building remaining in Copperopolis and one of two in Calaveras County. The brick church features a Gothic arch entrance and windows, a gable roof, and a bell tower. The church held Congregational services until it was leased to the Presbyterian Church; it became a Congregational church again in 1874 and remained so until 1895. In 1903, the Independent Order of Odd Fellows bought the church and converted it to a lodge hall. The Odd Fellows owned the church until 1939, when it became a community center.

The church was added to the National Register of Historic Places on December 30, 1997.
