= Angels Hotel =

Hotel in Angels Camp, California

- U.S. National Register of Historic Places
- California Historical Landmark No. 734
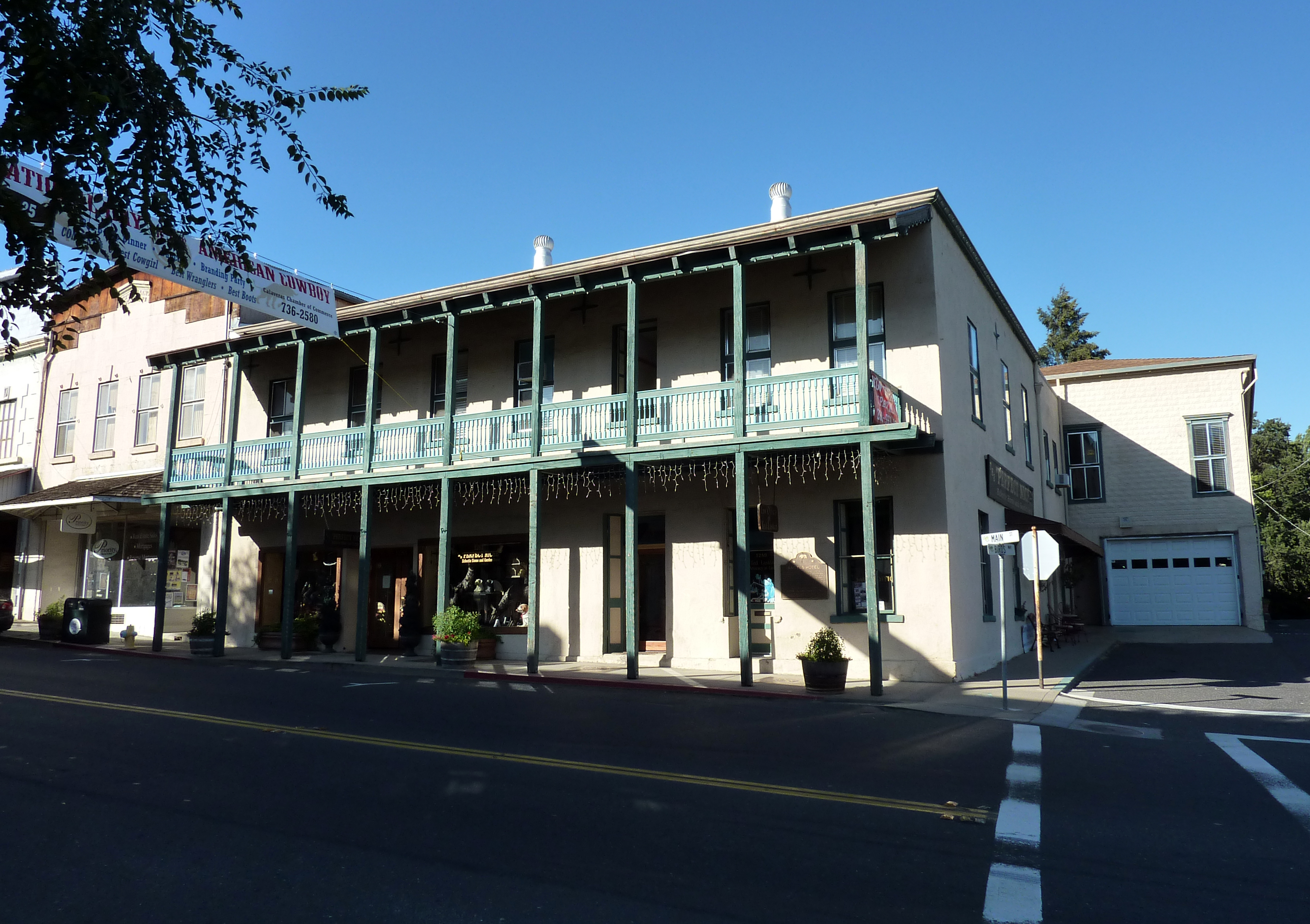

- Location within California Location within the United States
- Location: Main St. at Birds Way, Angels Camp, California
- Coordinates: 38°4′7.1″N 120°32′21.4″W
- Built: 1856
- Architect: C.C. Lake
- NRHP reference No.: 72000220
- CHISL No.: 734
- Added to NRHP: March 24, 1972

The Angels Hotel in Angels Camp, California, was the hotel where the author Mark Twain heard a story that he would later turn into his short story "The Celebrated Jumping Frog of Calaveras County".

The hotel was originally a canvas tent erected by C. C. Lake in 1851, and replaced by a one-story wooden structure. It was rebuilt with stone in 1855, and a second story was added in 1857.

In front of the building is the "Frog Hop of Fame", where commemorative plaques are embedded in the sidewalk for the winners of the annual Jumping Frog Jubilee frog jumping contest.

The building, no longer operated as a hotel, is registered as California Historical Landmark #734. It was also listed on the National Register of Historic Places in 1972. It is currently an apartment complex.

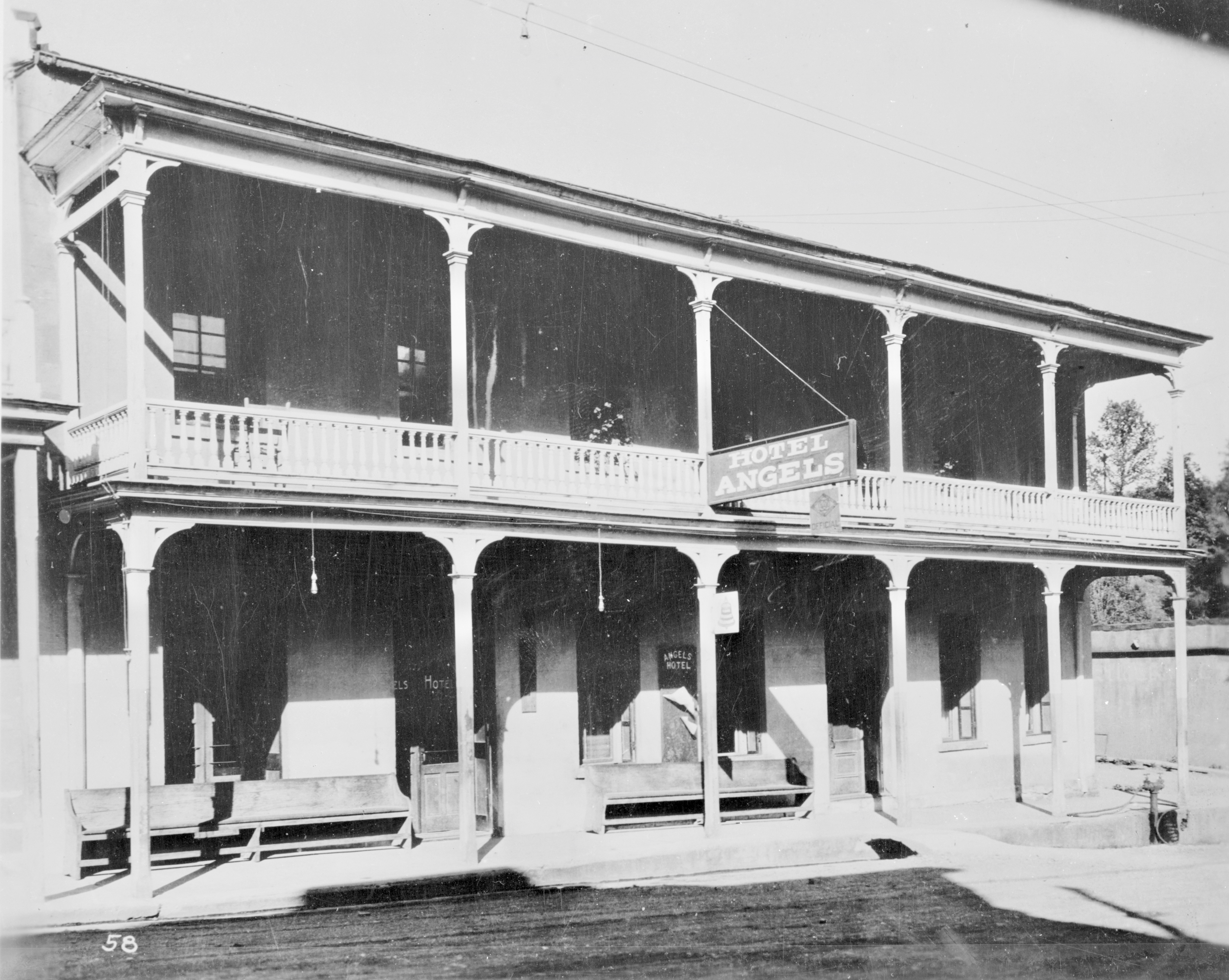
Angels Hotel, date unknown

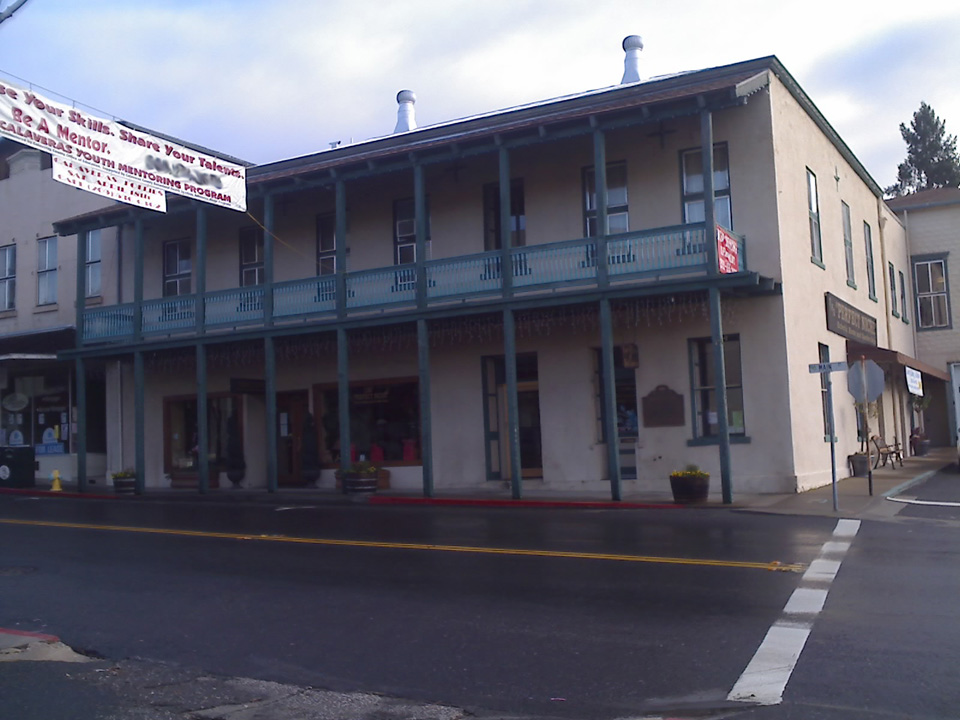
The hotel in 2009

== See also ==
- National Register of Historic Places listings in Calaveras County, California
