= Altaville Grammar School =

- U.S. National Register of Historic Places
- California Historical Landmark No. 329
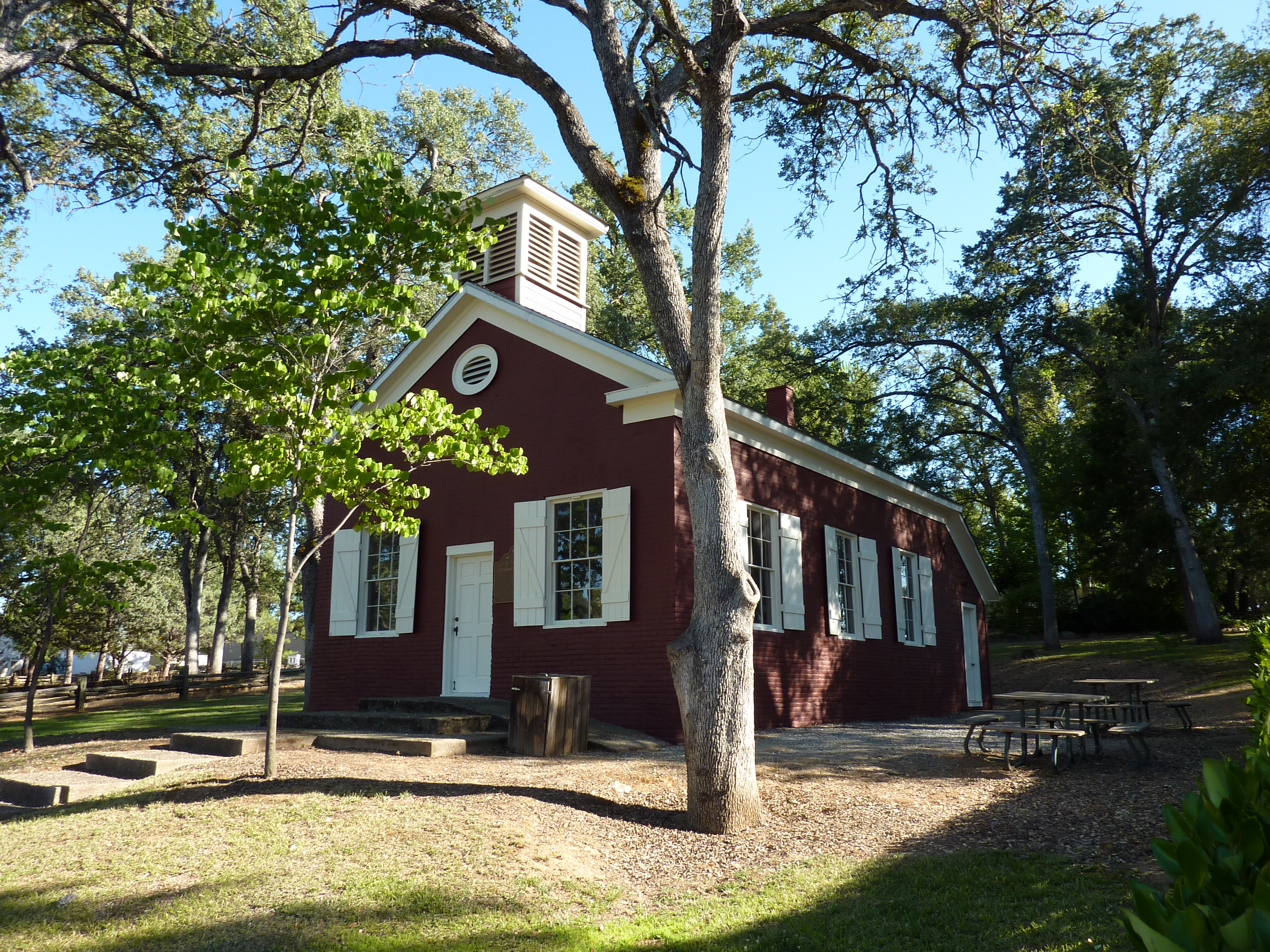

- Location within California Location within the United States
- Location: 125 N. Main St; Altaville, California
- Coordinates: 38.082977°N 120.561869°W
- Built: 1858
- Architectural style: Greek Revival
- NRHP reference No.: 79000471
- CHISL No.: 329
- Added to NRHP: August 24, 1979

The Altaville Grammar School in Altaville, California is one of the oldest grammar schools in California. It was built in 1858 of brick in the Greek Revival style and remained in use until 1950, when it was replaced by the Mark Twain Elementary School in Altaville. After its abandonment, it fell into disrepair, but was restored in 1989 by the Calaveras County Historical Society. The building serves now as an example of a typical schoolroom of the 19th century.

The schoolhouse is registered as California Historical Landmark #499 and is listed on the National Register of Historic Places (NPS-1979000471).
