= Altaville, California =

Unincorporated community in California, United States

Altaville
- Unincorporated community
- Location in California Altaville (the United States)
- Coordinates: 38°05′02″N 120°33′43″W
- Country: United States
- State: California
- County: Calaveras
- Elevation: 1,540 ft (470 m)

California Historical Landmark
- Reference no.: 288

Altaville (Alta, Spanish for "Upper" and Ville, French for "town") is a former unincorporated community in Calaveras County, California, United States, now located in the northwestern portion of the city of Angels Camp. It sits at a mean elevation of 1,542 feet (470 m) above sea level and is located at 38°05′02″N 120°33′43″W, at the intersection of SR 49 and SR 4. The community is served by ZIP code 95221 and area code 209.

The town was established in 1852 on Cherokee Creek and was known variously as Cherokee Flat, Forks-of-the Road, Low Divide, and Winterton over its history. Notorious bandit Joaquin Murrieta supposedly spent so much time here that a mountain northwest of the creek was named Joaquin Mountain. Although gold was discovered here in 1854, it did not last long, but the town survived due to its position as an important point for supplies and machinery. D.D. Demerest established a foundry here in 1854, and others soon followed. Most of the stamp mills and a large part of the mining machinery erected in Calaveras and Tuolumne counties were built at the Altaville Foundry. A brick schoolhouse was built at Altaville in 1858 and the townsite was established in 1873.

A post office was established in 1904, closed in 1943, and re-established in 1944.

Altaville was also the site of an archaeological hoax, the Calaveras Skull.

The town today is registered as California Historical Landmark #288.
