= Honigsberger Store =

- U.S. National Register of Historic Places
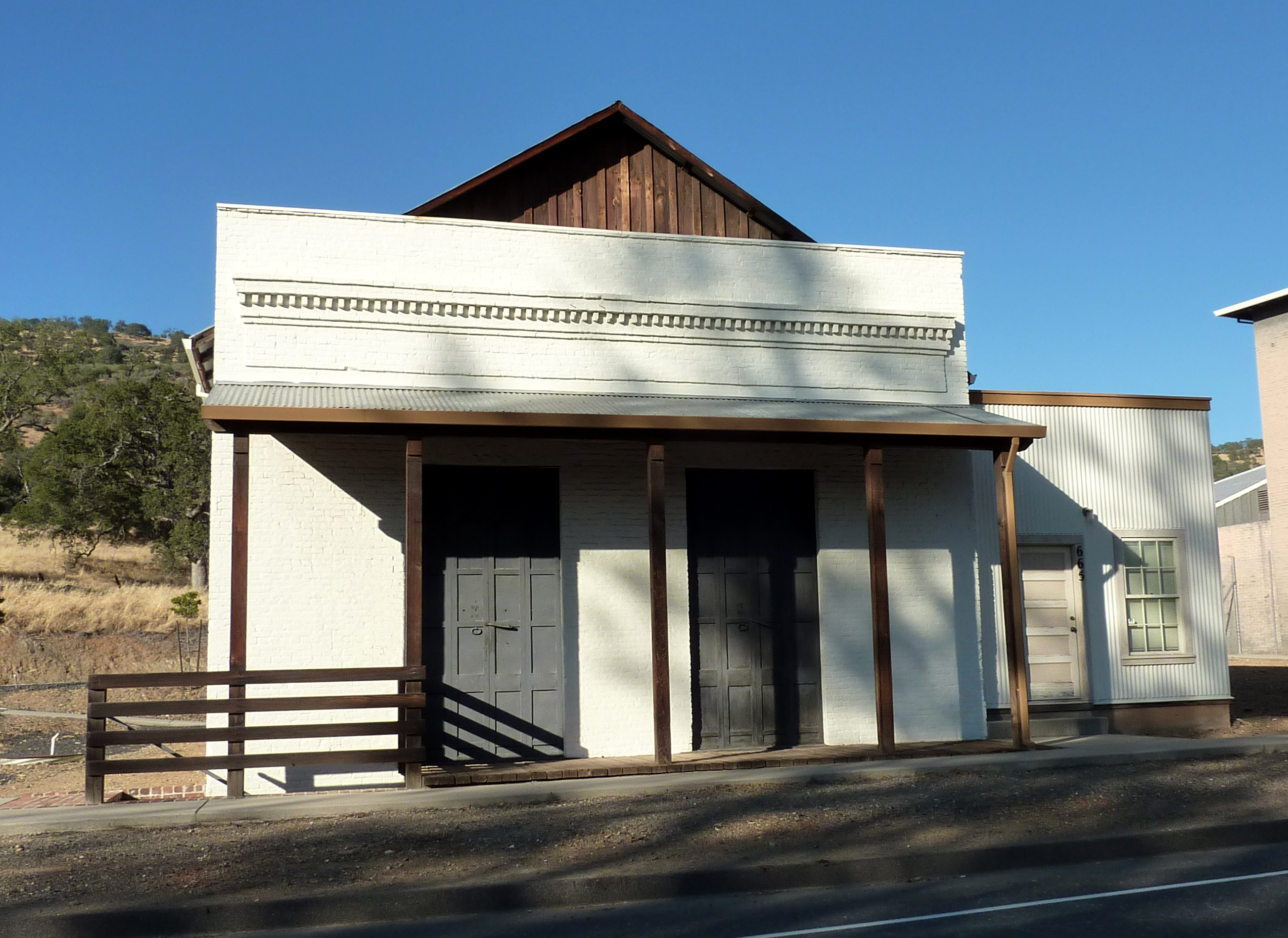

- Location within California Location within the United States
- Location: 665 Main St., Copperopolis, California
- Coordinates: 37°58′34″N 120°38′7″W
- Area: less than one acre
- Built: 1865
- Architectural style: Neoclassical
- NRHP reference No.: 92000310
- Added to NRHP: April 2, 1992

The Honigsberger Store is a historic building located at 665 Main St. in Copperopolis, California. Businessman L. Honigsberger built the store in 1865, replacing the original store he built in 1861. The brick building was designed in the Neoclassical style. The store served Copperopolis during its first copper boom in the 1860s; however, an 1867 fire and declining copper production caused Copperopolis to lose most of its population and severely diminished the store's business. In 1905, the Honigsberger family sold the store to the Union Copper Mining Company, which became the Calaveras Copper Mining Company four years later. The company used the store as a warehouse during another copper boom in Copperopolis from 1909 to 1929. The store is one of only four extant buildings from Copperopolis' first copper boom in the 1860s.

The Honigsberger Store was added to the National Register of Historic Places on April 2, 1992.
