= Copperopolis Armory =

- U.S. National Register of Historic Places
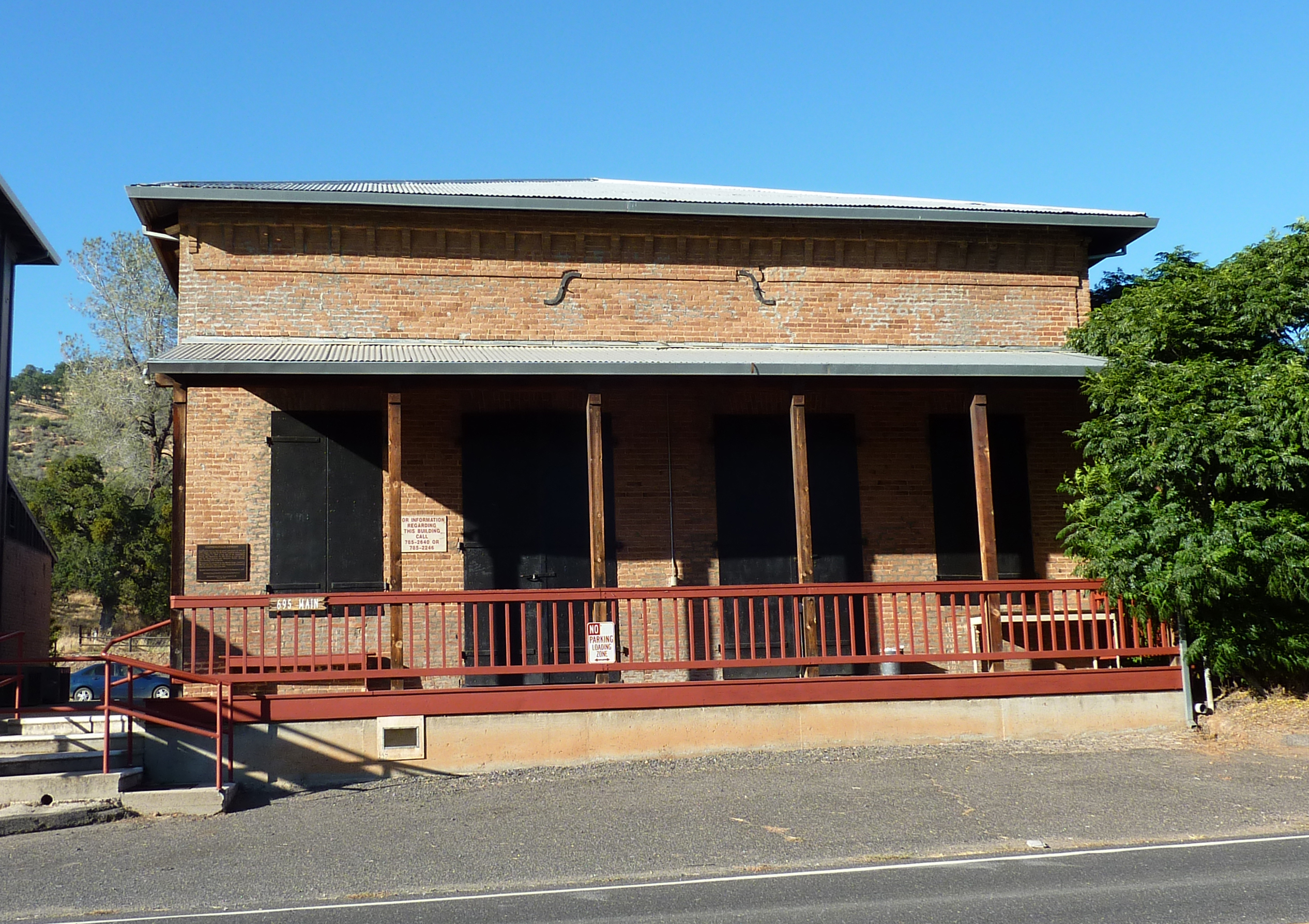

- Location within California Location within the United States
- Location: 695 Main St., Copperopolis, California
- Coordinates: 37°58′34″N 120°38′4″W
- Area: less than one acre
- Built: 1864
- Architectural style: Greek Revival
- NRHP reference No.: 97001588
- Added to NRHP: December 30, 1997

The Copperopolis Armory is a Civil War armory located at 695 Main St. in Copperopolis, California. The brick Greek Revival building was constructed in 1864 to house the Union Guard of Copperopolis, the town's regiment of the Union Army. Copperopolis largely owed its existence to the war; the town grew due to a boom in local copper mining in 1860, which stemmed from the Union Army's need for copper ammunition. The armory served a variety of purposes for the Union Guard; at the building, new soldiers were enlisted, training was conducted, and arms and supplies were stored. Military balls, victory celebrations, and the local funeral ceremonies for Abraham Lincoln also took place in the armory. The armory also held an 1837 bronze cannon, which was used for ceremonial purposes and arms training; the cannon remains in the building and is one of the few American bronze cannons from the era in California. After the war, the Independent Order of Odd Fellows bought the building, which they converted to a social hall. In 1940, the armory became a community center.

The armory was added to the National Register of Historic Places on December 30, 1997.
