= Lancha Plana, California =

Lancha Plana
- Former settlement
- Location in California
- Coordinates: 38°13′29″N 120°54′07″W
- Country: United States
- State: California
- County: Amador
- Elevation: 220 ft (67 m)
- GNIS feature ID: 253642

California Historical Landmark
- Reference no.: 30

Lancha Plana (Spanish for "Flat Boat") was a small settlement in Amador County, California, United States, formed as a result of a flatboat ferry crossing across the Mokelumne River.

== History ==
It was founded by Mexican miners in 1848. The remnants of the town were submerged as a result of the damming of the river to form the Camanche Reservoir. Lancha Plana Bridge crosses the lake now about where the town once stood. It was briefly known as "Sonora Bar", as most miners were from Sonora.

Lancha Plana is registered as a California Historical Landmark.

A post office operated at Lancha Plana from 1859 to 1919, with a closure from 1912 to 1913.

== Geography ==
It lay on the north bank of the Mokelumne River, 9 miles (14 km) south-southeast of Ione, at an elevation of 220 feet (67 m).
