= San Andreas, California =

- Census-designated place
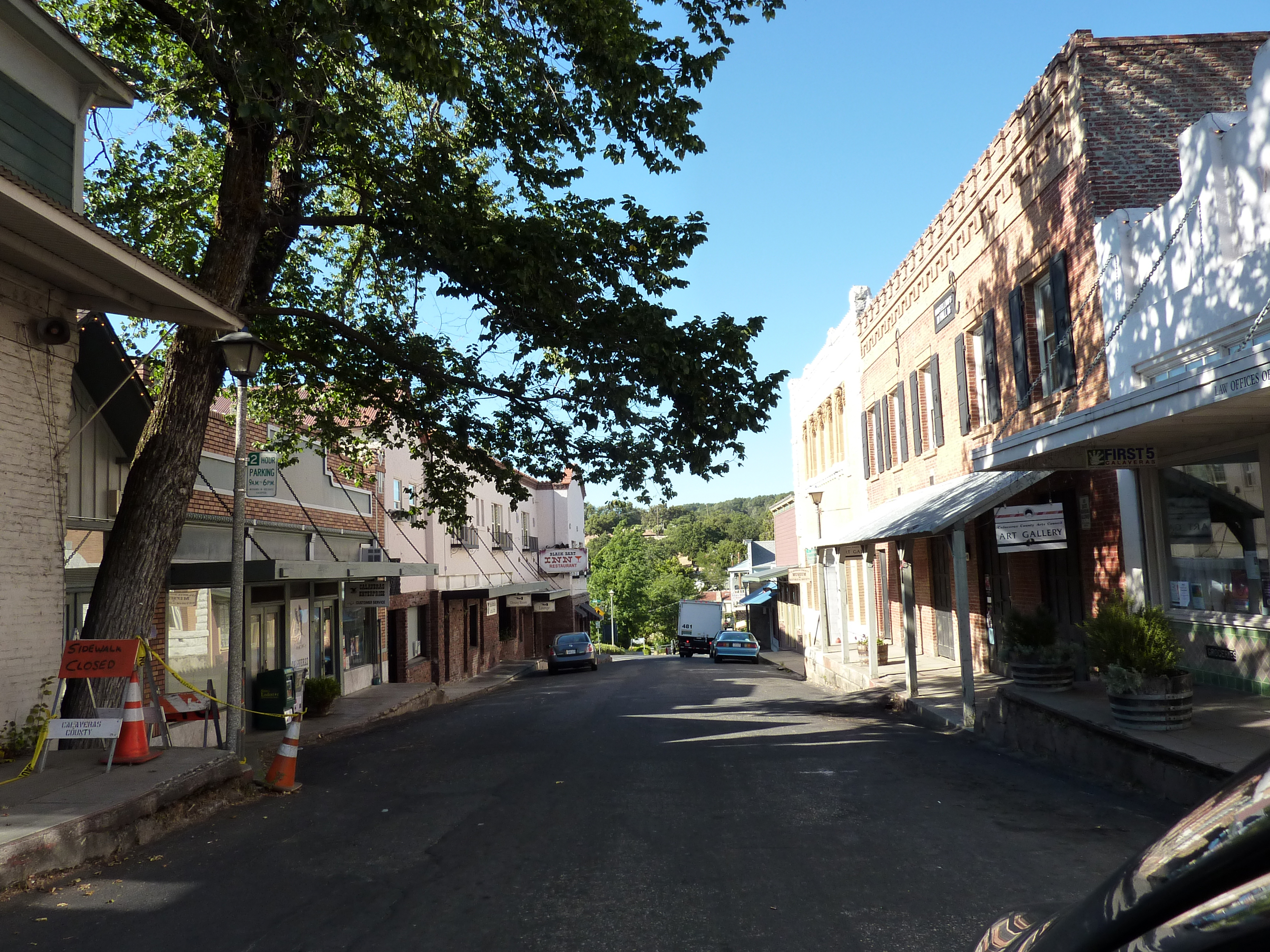
- Main Street
- Interactive map of San Andreas, California
- Location in the United States
- Coordinates: 38°11′46″N 120°40′50″W
- Country: United States
- State: California
- County: Calaveras

Area
  - Total: 8.406 sq mi (21.771 km^{2})
  - Land: 8.390 sq mi (21.730 km^{2})
  - Water: 0.016 sq mi (0.041 km^{2}) 0.19%
- Elevation: 879 ft (268 m)

Population (2020)
  - Total: 2,994
  - Density: 356.9/sq mi (137.8/km^{2})
- Time zone: UTC-8 (Pacific (PST))
  - Summer (DST): UTC-7 (PDT)
- ZIP codes: 95249-95250
- Area code: 209
- FIPS code: 06-64420
- GNIS feature IDs: 277590, 2409247

California Historical Landmark
- Reference no.: 252

San Andreas (Californio Spanish for "St. Andrew") is an unincorporated census-designated place in, and the county seat of, Calaveras County, California, United States. The population was 2,994 at the 2020 census, up from 2,783 at the 2010 census. Like most towns in the region, it was founded during the California Gold Rush. The town is located on State Route 49 and is registered as California Historical Landmark #252.

== History ==
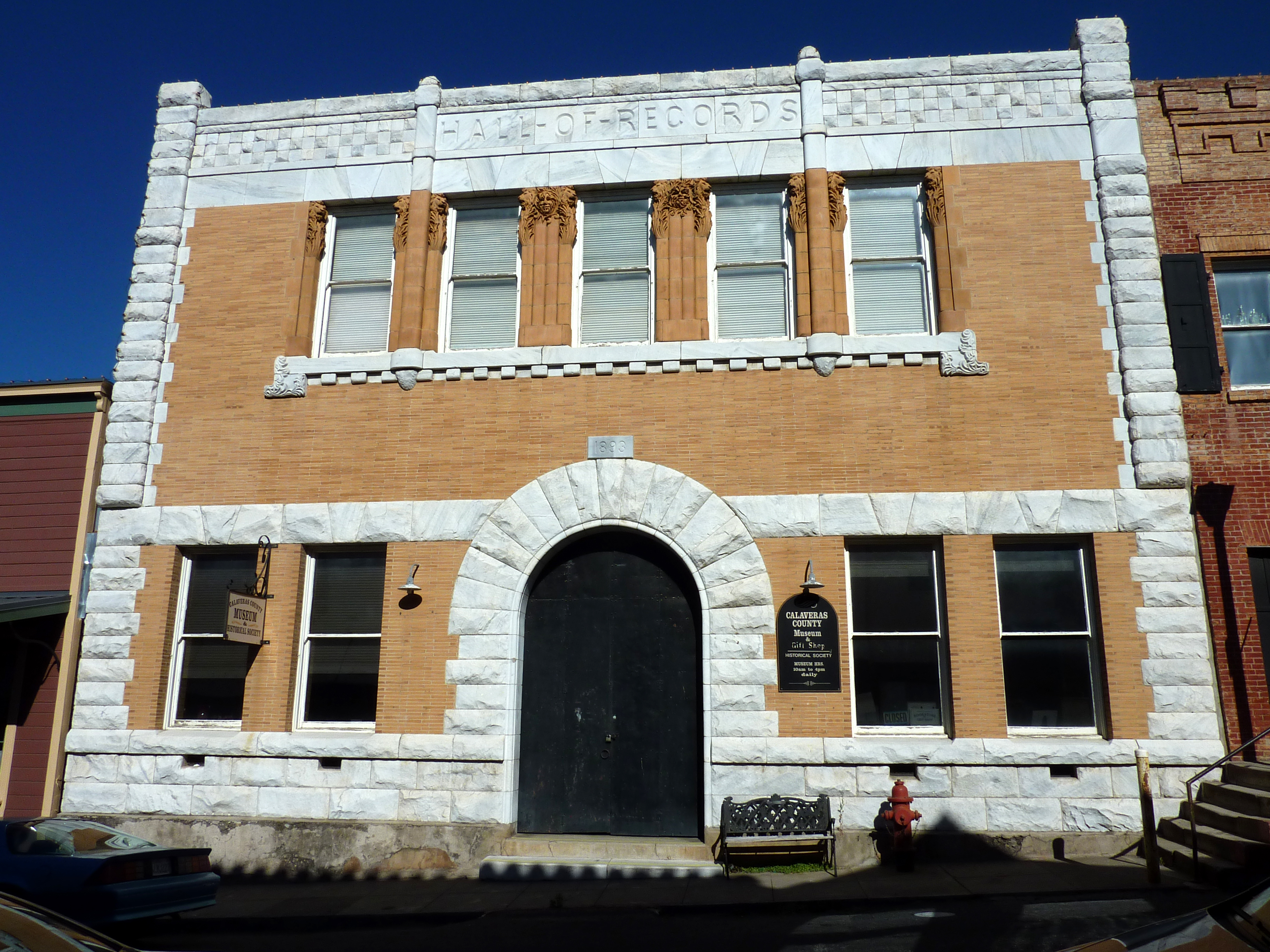
Old Calaveras County Courthouse, built 1867, served in that role for 100 years. Afterwards, it was turned into the Calaveras County Museum, and was listed on the National Register of Historic Places (NRHP).

Settled by Mexican gold miners in 1848 and named after the Catholic parish St. Andrew, the town has been a noted mining camp since early days. It existed as a tent city for the first few years, and even included a tent church. A few miles outside of town is the Pioneer Cemetery, established in c. 1851.

In August 1852, a nugget of gold was found here and was sold to Wells Fargo & Co. for US$12,000. The gold from the initially discovered placers gave out after a few years, but the discovery of gold in an underground river channel in 1853 revitalized the camp and it soon became a town. Mining of the channels was lucrative enough for the town to completely rebuild after fires in 1858 and 1863. The gold discovered here contributed greatly to the success of the Union during the Civil War.

In 1866, San Andreas became the seat of Calaveras County. It was said to be a rendezvous location for Joaquin Murrieta. Notorious highwayman Black Bart was tried here and sent to prison.

The post office was established in 1854.

== Geography ==
According to the United States Census Bureau, the CDP has a total area of 8.4 square miles (22 km^{2}), of which 99.81% is land and 0.19% is water.

=== Climate ===
San Andreas has a Mediterranean climate typical of the Sierra Nevada foothills. Winters are cool and wet with mild days, chilly nights, and substantial rainfall. Summers are hot and dry with very hot days, cool nights, and minimal rainfall. Due to the orographic effect, rainfall in all seasons is significantly greater than on the valley floor to the west.

Climate data for San Andreas
Month	Jan	Feb	Mar	Apr	May	Jun	Jul	Aug	Sep	Oct	Nov	Dec	Year
Mean daily maximum °F (°C)	55.5 (13.1)	60.3 (15.7)	64.7 (18.2)	69.6 (20.9)	79.1 (26.2)	88.0 (31.1)	94.9 (34.9)	94.0 (34.4)	88.7 (31.5)	77.6 (25.3)	64.0 (17.8)	55.1 (12.8)	74.3 (23.5)
Daily mean °F (°C)	45.3 (7.4)	49.1 (9.5)	52.8 (11.6)	56.2 (13.4)	63.5 (17.5)	71.1 (21.7)	76.9 (24.9)	76.5 (24.7)	71.4 (21.9)	62.1 (16.7)	51.7 (10.9)	45.7 (7.6)	60.2 (15.7)
Mean daily minimum °F (°C)	35.0 (1.7)	37.8 (3.2)	40.9 (4.9)	42.8 (6.0)	47.9 (8.8)	54.2 (12.3)	59.0 (15.0)	58.9 (14.9)	54.1 (12.3)	46.6 (8.1)	39.2 (4.0)	36.4 (2.4)	46.1 (7.8)
Average precipitation inches (mm)	5.40 (137)	5.15 (131)	4.15 (105)	2.40 (61)	0.71 (18)	0.27 (6.9)	0.04 (1.0)	0.07 (1.8)	0.25 (6.4)	1.50 (38)	3.22 (82)	5.45 (138)	28.61 (726.1)
Average relative humidity (%)	74.6	70.0	66.6	59.4	51.4	43.5	38.6	38.2	39.4	46.9	63.4	72.6	55.4
Source: PRISM Climate Group

== Demographics ==
Historical population
Census	Pop.	Note	%±
2000	2,615		—
2010	2,783		6.4%
2020	2,994		7.6%
U.S. Decennial Census; 1860–1870 1880-1890; 1900 1910 1920; 1930 1940 1950; 1960 1970 1980; 1990 2000 2010

=== Racial and ethnic composition ===
San Andreas CDP, California – Racial and ethnic composition Note: the US Census treats Hispanic/Latino as an ethnic category. This table excludes Latinos from the racial categories and assigns them to a separate category. Hispanics/Latinos may be of any race.
Race / Ethnicity (NH = Non-Hispanic)	Pop 2000	Pop 2010	Pop 2020	% 2000	% 2010	% 2020
White alone (NH)	2,310	2,330	2,270	88.34%	83.72%	75.82%
Black or African American alone (NH)	2	17	26	0.08%	0.61%	0.87%
Native American or Alaska Native alone (NH)	35	36	39	1.34%	1.29%	1.30%
Asian alone (NH)	19	27	53	0.73%	0.97%	1.77%
Native Hawaiian or Pacific Islander alone (NH)	0	1	6	0.00%	0.04%	0.20%
Other race alone (NH)	7	0	26	0.27%	0.00%	0.87%
Mixed race or Multiracial (NH)	76	117	210	2.91%	4.20%	7.01%
Hispanic or Latino (any race)	166	255	364	6.35%	9.16%	12.16%
Total	2,615	2,783	2,994	100.00%	100.00%	100.00%

=== 2020 census ===
As of the 2020 census, San Andreas had a population of 2,994 and a population density of 356.9 inhabitants per square mile (137.8/km^{2}). The median age was 46.2 years.

For every 100 females, there were 97.5 males; for every 100 females age 18 and over, there were 98.3 males age 18 and over. The age distribution was 20.2% under age 18, 5.9% from 18 to 24, 22.6% from 25 to 44, 25.6% from 45 to 64, and 25.7% age 65 or older.

The census reported that 92.4% of the population lived in households, 1.0% lived in non-institutionalized group quarters, and 6.6% were institutionalized. Of residents, 0.0% lived in urban areas and 100.0% lived in rural areas.

There were 1,172 households, of which 24.7% included children under age 18. Of all households, 37.3% were married-couple households, 8.6% were cohabiting couple households, 34.9% had a female householder with no partner present, and 19.2% had a male householder with no partner present. About 33.7% of households were one person, and 20.0% were one person aged 65 or older. The average household size was 2.36, and there were 671 families (57.3% of all households).

There were 1,296 housing units at an average density of 154.5 units per square mile (59.7 units/km^{2}). Of all housing units, 9.6% were vacant. Of the 1,172 occupied units, 59.0% were owner-occupied and 41.0% were renter-occupied. The homeowner vacancy rate was 3.5%, and the rental vacancy rate was 7.0%.

== Politics ==
In the state legislature, San Andreas is in the 4th senatorial district, represented by Republican Marie Alvarado-Gil, and the 8th Assembly district, represented by Republican David Tangipa. Federally, San Andreas is in California's 5th congressional district, represented by Republican Tom McClintock.
