= Angels Camp, California =

City in California, United States

Angels Camp, California Angels
- City
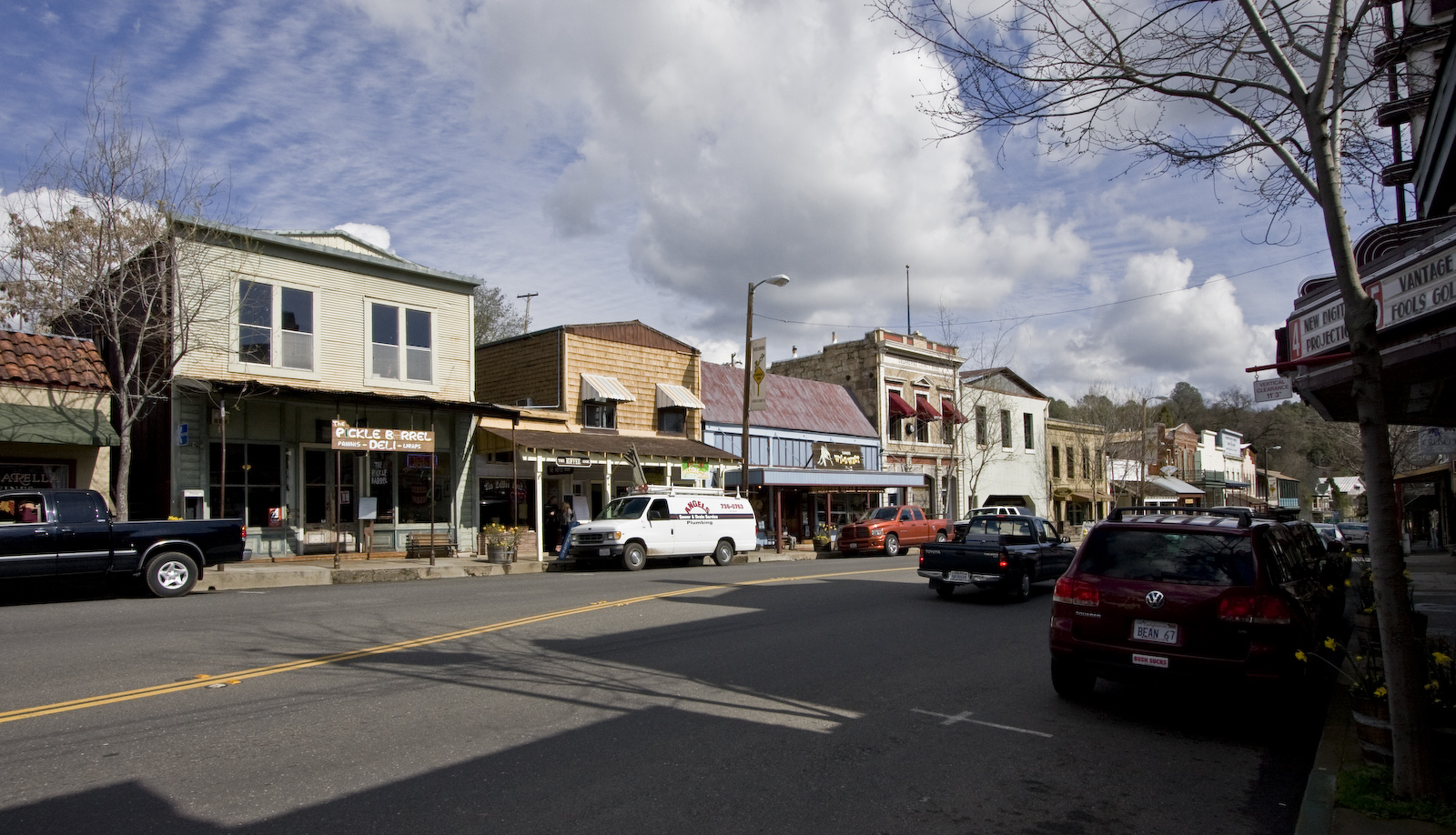
- Downtown Angels Camp in 2008

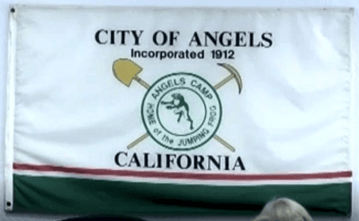
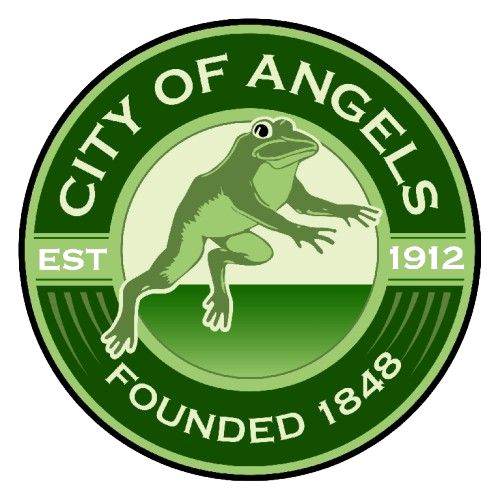
- Flag Seal
- Nickname: Frogtown
- Motto: "Redefining The Rush"
- Interactive map of Angels Camp, California
- Location in the United States
- Coordinates: 38°04′06″N 120°32′23″W
- Country: United States
- State: California
- County: Calaveras
- Mining camp: 1848
- Incorporated: January 24, 1912

Government
  - Mayor: Michael Chimente
  - Vice Mayor: Caroline Schirato
  - City Administrator: Pamela Caronongan

Area
  - Total: 3.64 sq mi (9.42 km^{2})
  - Land: 3.63 sq mi (9.41 km^{2})
  - Water: 0.0039 sq mi (0.01 km^{2}) 0.25%
- Elevation: 1,381 ft (421 m)

Population (2020)
  - Total: 3,667
  - Density: 1,009.5/sq mi (389.78/km^{2})
- Time zone: UTC-8 (PST)
  - Summer (DST): UTC-7 (PDT)
- ZIP code: 95222
- Area code: 209
- FIPS code: 06-02112
- GNIS feature IDs: 1667877, 2409709
- Website: angelscamp.gov

California Historical Landmark
- Reference no.: 287

Angels Camp (formerly Angel's Camp, Angels, Angels City, Carson's Creek and Clearlake), is the only incorporated city in Calaveras County, California, United States. The population was 3,667 at the 2020 census. It lies at an elevation of 1381 feet (421 m).

Established in 1849, the town was a quartz mining destination in the nineteenth and early twentieth centuries. Over $100 million was generated from mining activities. Black Bart, Joaquin Murieta, and other outlaws were said to have spent time in the town. Mark Twain based his short story "The Celebrated Jumping Frog of Calaveras County" on a story he claimed to have heard at the Angels Hotel in 1865. The event is commemorated with a Jumping Frog Jubilee each May at the Calaveras County Fairgrounds, just east of the city. Because of this, Angels Camp is sometimes referred to as "Frogtown."

The city is California Historical Landmark #287.

== History ==
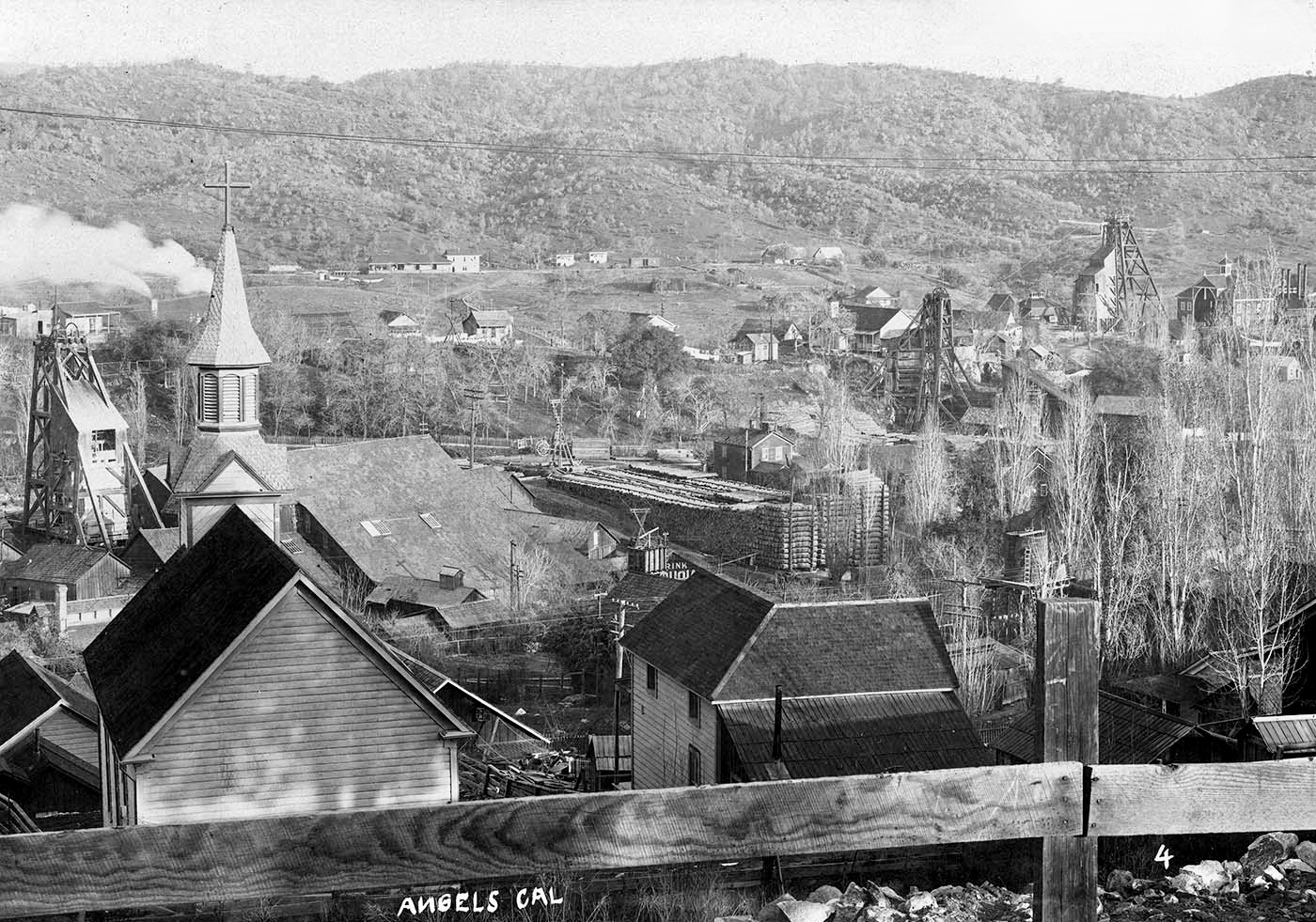
Angels Camp around 1900

In May 1848, Henry Pinkney Angell, a native of Rhode Island, is said to have left Monterey, California with 92 men in search of gold. By July, they were gold mining on Weber Creek before moving on to a small unnamed tributary of the Stanislaus River. It was decided to set up camp where the tributary met Dry Creek, since the area seemed promising. In this new camp, Angell set up a store on the banks of the creek to trade essential items for gold. By the spring of 1849, the camp population had grown to 300 miners.

The first post office was established in 1851 (and called Carson's Creek). It was renamed along with the town in 1853. In 1853, Angel opened Magee and Angel's Hotel, in a partnership with Cave City.

The placers around his camp were productive but gave out after a few years, and the population began to dwindle until gold-bearing quartz veins were discovered in the town, which brought people back. The first major quartz discovery was in 1854, in the grounds where the Winters brothers and Davis & Company were ground sluicing. The vein of quartz was 10 to 90 feet wide. In the 1880s, technological progress allowed the miners to go deeper than they had before, and new mines were established. Those mines operated for the next few decades, producing more than $20 million worth of gold, processed by stamp mills in town. By 1890, the census recorded 917 residents of the town.

In 1902, the Sierra Railroad was introduced. The city was incorporated under the name of "Angels" in 1912.

During World War I, the major mines shut down, due to both labor shortages and rising operating costs. However, there was a revival in mining activity in the 1930s, which reportedly generated at least $30 million. During World War II, the final gold mines were closed in 1942, as they were deemed non-essential businesses. It was said that when the last mill finally ceased operations, the townspeople couldn't sleep, the silence was so loud.

== Geography ==
Angels Camp is located at 38°04′06″N 120°32′23″W.

According to the United States Census Bureau, the city has a total area of 3.6 square miles (9.3 km^{2}), all land.

Angels Camp is about 1,400 feet (430 m) above sea level, with Angels Creek flowing through the middle of town.

=== Climate ===
According to the Köppen Climate Classification system, Angels Camp has a hot-summer Mediterranean climate, abbreviated "Csa" on climate maps.

== Demographics ==
Historical population
| Census | Pop. | Note | %± |
|---|---|---|---|
| 1880 | 330 | | — |
| 1890 | 917 | | 177.9% |
| 1920 | 941 | | — |
| 1930 | 915 | | −2.8% |
| 1940 | 1,163 | | 27.1% |
| 1950 | 1,147 | | −1.4% |
| 1960 | 1,121 | | −2.3% |
| 1970 | 1,710 | | 52.5% |
| 1980 | 2,302 | | 34.6% |
| 1990 | 2,409 | | 4.6% |
| 2000 | 3,004 | | 24.7% |
| 2010 | 3,836 | | 27.7% |
| 2020 | 3,667 | | −4.4% |
U.S. Decennial Census

The 2020 United States census reported that Angels Camp had a population of 3,667. The population density was 1,009.6 inhabitants per square mile (389.8/km^{2}). The racial makeup of Angels Camp was 81.1% White, 0.7% African American, 2.1% Native American, 1.3% Asian, 0.2% Pacific Islander, 3.8% from other races, and 10.8% from two or more races. Hispanic or Latino of any race were 12.5% of the population.

The census reported that 98.4% of the population lived in households, 1.6% lived in non-institutionalized group quarters, and no one was institutionalized.

There were 1,635 households, out of which 24.5% included children under the age of 18, 46.5% were married-couple households, 7.3% were cohabiting couple households, 30.0% had a female householder with no partner present, and 16.1% had a male householder with no partner present. 29.4% of households were one person, and 17.0% were one person aged 65 or older. The average household size was 2.21. There were 1,036 families (63.4% of all households).

The age distribution was 18.2% under the age of 18, 5.5% aged 18 to 24, 19.6% aged 25 to 44, 26.1% aged 45 to 64, and 30.6% who were 65 years of age or older. The median age was 51.6 years. For every 100 females, there were 89.5 males.

There were 1,907 housing units at an average density of 525.1 units per square mile (202.7 units/km^{2}), of which 1,635 (85.7%) were occupied. Of these, 68.2% were owner-occupied, and 31.8% were occupied by renters.

The median household income was $60,353, and the per capita income was $31,454. About 10.5% of families and 13.5% of the population were below the poverty line.

== Government ==
In the state legislature, Angels Camp is in the 4th senatorial district, represented by Republican Marie Alvarado-Gil, and the 8th Assembly district, represented by Republican David Tangipa. Federally, Angels Camp is in California's 5th congressional district, represented by Republican Tom McClintock.

== Notable people ==
- Sara Carter — musician and entertainer, Carter Family
- T.J. Dillashaw — former UFC bantamweight champion
- Amanda Folendorf — first deaf female mayor in the United States
- Mike McCormick — Major League Baseball player
- Catfish Metkovich — Major League Baseball player
- Tommy Orange — Native American writer and novelist
- Kyle Rasmussen — United States Ski Team member and two-time Alpine skiing World Cup Downhill champion
- Frank Elbridge Webb — Engineer and presidential candidate in 1928 and 1932
- Ione Bright - Broadway actress, b. 1887

== See also ==
- Prince-Garibaldi Building
- California Historical Landmarks in Calaveras County
- Birthplace of Archie Stevenot
- Robinson's Ferry
