= Tamarack Fire =

2021 wildfire in California and Nevada

- Part of the 2021 California wildfires
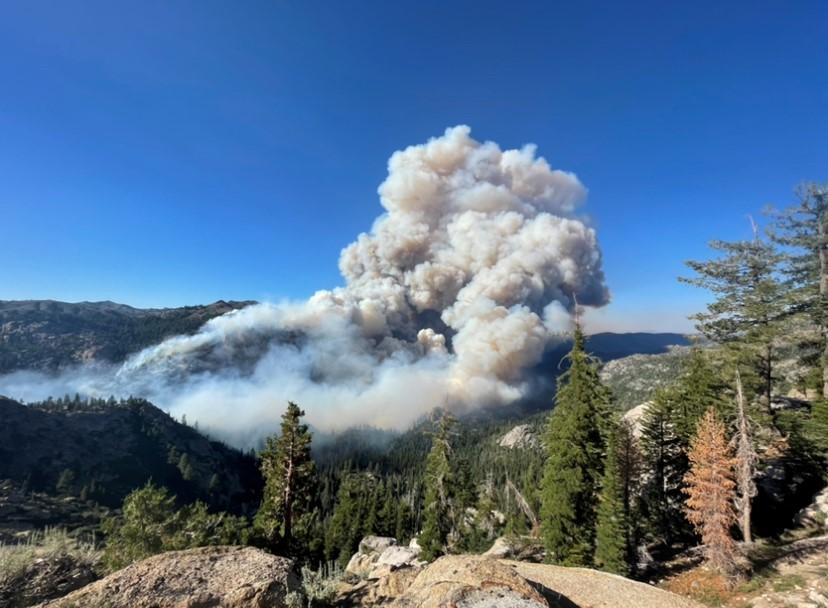
- The Tamarack Fire visible from Markleeville on July 17, 2021
- Date: July 4, 2021 –; October 8, 2021
- Location: Mokelumne Wilderness, Alpine County, California, United States
- Coordinates: 38.628°N 119.857°W

Statistics
- Burned area: 68,637 acres (27,776 ha)

Impacts
- Structures lost: 23 destroyed 3 damaged
- Cost: $8.7 million

Ignition
- Cause: Lightning strike

Map
- Location in California

The Tamarack Fire was a wildfire that burned 68,637 acres (27,776 ha), primarily in the Mokelumne Wilderness in Alpine County, California, Douglas County, Nevada and Lyon County, Nevada, as part of the 2021 California wildfire season.

The fire was first reported burning on a rocky ridgetop on July 4, 2021, a result of a lightning strike. The fire was allowed to burn naturally due to concerns for fire crew safety in the rugged area and the lack of fuels and the natural barriers on the ridgetop that limited the fire's growth. However, on July 16, high winds caused the fire to move down the ridge. High winds and dry fuels and conditions caused the fire the grow rapidly to 21,000 acres (8,498 ha) by July 17. The fire continued to grow, threatening numerous communities, including Markleeville and highways in the area, including State Highway 89, 88 and 395. In total, 2,439 people were evacuated and over 500 structures were threatened by the Tamarack Fire. At least twenty structures were damaged or destroyed. The fire caused $8.7 million in damages.

== Progression ==
=== July ===
The Tamarack Fire was first reported July 4 on a rocky ridgetop in the Mokelumne Wilderness, approximately seven miles southwest of Markleeville in Alpine County, California. The fire was started by a lightning strike with the incident origin listed as 4:00 p.m. The CalFire incident shows a start of 11:57 a.m. The fire was underway earlier in the morning, so it was thought to have started during lightning the night before. The United States Forest Service fire crews struggled to access the rugged area, resulting in the Forest Service making the “tactical management decision not to insert fire crews to fight the fire due to safety concerns.” The fire was allowed to burn naturally assuming the sparse fuels and natural barriers in the fire area would limit the fire's growth. The earliest acreage evaluation the fire, provided during the week of July 5, was 37 acres (15 ha).

However, on July 16, gusty winds pushed the fire down slope. The fire was reported to be 100 acres (40 ha). The Forest Service requested that crews hike to the fire and aircraft be brought in to support. The Forest Service reported that the fire was growing rapidly, fueled by dry grass, timber, chaparral and low relative humidity. Alpine County Sheriff's Office announced by 7:55 PM that Markleeville was under mandatory evacuation. By 9 PM, mandatory evacuations were put in place for Grover Hot Springs State Park, Shay Creek, Markleeville Village, and East Fork Resort. The Washoe Tribe of Nevada and California community of Hung A Lei Ti was also evacuated. Highway 89 over Monitor Pass in Mono County was closed.

As the fire burned overnight into July 17, three structures were destroyed. Ash was reported to be falling in the Carson Valley that day. The fire jumped the east fork of the Carson River, resulting in the evacuation of Alpine Village and Woodfords. This resulted in an evacuation center in Alpine Village being relocated to Gardnerville, Nevada. The Tamarack Fire grew to 21,000 acres (8,498 ha) by the evening of July 17 and threatened the Highway 89 corridor. Two more structures were destroyed and additional evacuations and voluntary evacuations were put in place. On the following day, July 18, the Pacific Crest Trail was closed in the area. That day, crews began building fire lines around Markleeville, portions of Highway 89, and other threatened, evacuated areas. Dramatic fire activity sent a pyrocumulonimbus into the sky, which created its own weather, resulting in lightning strikes.

By the evening of Monday, July 19, the Tamarack Fire was reported to be 39,045 acres (15,801 ha) in size. Two more structures were destroyed that day. Heavy smoke, thunderstorms, wind and lightning caused the fire to expand northeast towards the state line of California and Nevada. Concerns about the fire threatening Highway 395 arose and crews began working to prevent the fires expansion towards the highway. Additional mandatory evacuations were put in place for Mesa Vista, California and Blue Lakes Road. A temporary flight restriction was placed over the fire zone on July 20. By the morning of July 21, the fire had crossed over the state line into Douglas County, Nevada, three miles west of Highway 395. Portions of Highway 88 and Highway 395 was closed. The fire grew 10,000 acres (4,047 ha) overnight, growing to over 50,000 acres (20,234 ha) by July 22. The fire burned north and south along Highway 395, but did not jump the highway. That same day, the fire was four percent contained. Additionally, evacuation orders were lifted for Hung A Lei Ti.

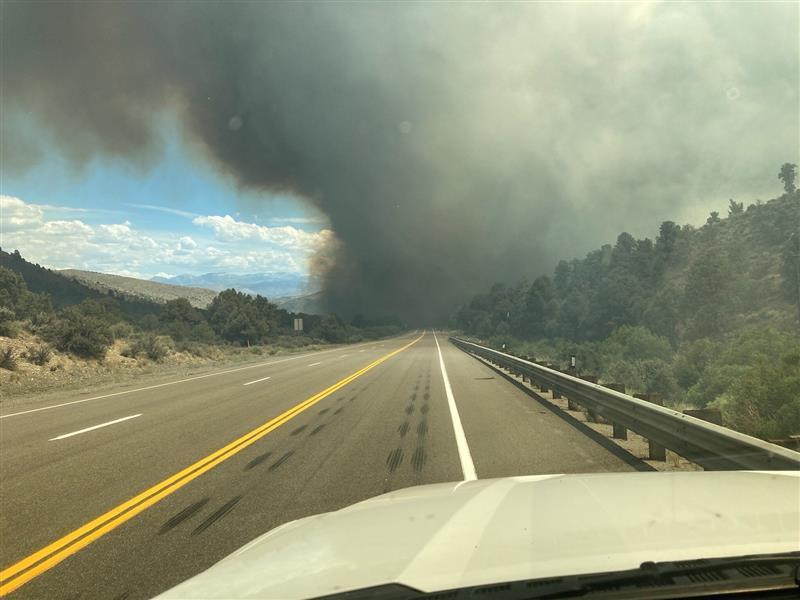
A spot fire burning on the east side of Highway 395 on the afternoon of July 22.

Despite efforts by fire crews to hold the fire from crossing Highway 395, in the afternoon of July 22, a spot fire jumped through control lines over the highway at Holbrook Junction, Nevada. This led to mandatory evacuations of Topaz Ranch Estates and Topaz Lake, Nevada. Highway 395 closures were expanded due to the threat. Additionally, voluntary evacuations were put in place for portions of Lyon County, Nevada, in Smith Valley, out of concern of the fires growth. A State of Emergency was declared by the Douglas County Board of Commissioners the following day. That afternoon, July 23, Nevada governor Steve Sisolak declared a state of emergency in Douglas County, along with California governor Gavin Newsom for Alpine County. Ten additional structures were reported destroyed, including eight homes, and two additional homes were damaged, all on the Nevada side. The fire was mapped at over 65,000 acres (26,305 ha) by July 24. During this time, crews continued to build containment lines, put out hot spots, and implement structure protection, including in and around Washoe tribal land, neighborhoods around Highway 395, and at Leviathan Mine. By the end of the week, Sunday July 25, the fire was 27 percent contained. The mandatory evacuation for Mesa Vista was lifted.

On Monday, July 26, almost three weeks since the fire was first reported, containment reached 45 percent. Evacuation orders were lifted for communities in both Alpine and Douglas Counties, with over 2,000 residents returning home. This included Markleeville, Alpine Village, Woodfords, Topaz Lake, and other areas. Portions of Highway 395 and Highway 88 were also reopened. Heavy rain was expected for the area, resulting in a flash flood warning for region in California and Nevada. Steady rain and thunderstorms helped improve firefighting conditions overnight, leading to 54 percent containment by July 27. Evacuations were lifted for the Blue Lakes area, Holbrook Junction/Highlands and Spring Valley. The next day, road closures were lifted for Highway 4 and Highway 89. Alpine County evacuations were lifted along Highway 4. On July 28, governors Gavin Newsom and Steve Sisolak toured the fire area. Alpine County lifted more evacuations, for Burnside Rd. & Burnside Lake, on July 30. The closed portion of the Pacific Crest Trail reopened on July 31. By the morning of July 31, the fire was 79 percent contained.

=== August ===
Smoke from the Dixie Fire settled atop the Tamarack, limiting aerial operations. However, firefighters progressed on spot fires. As of August 22, the Tamarack Fire had burned 68,637 acres (27,776 ha) and was 82 percent contained. Twenty-three buildings had been destroyed.

=== October ===
Minimal fire activity continued throughout August and September while crews worked to fully contain the fire. On October 8, the Tamarack Fire was 100% contained.

== Effects ==
The Tamarack Fire resulted in the evacuation of rural communities and recreational areas in California and Nevada. Over 800 people were evacuated and 500 structures were threatened. It caused the closure of portions of Highway 89. The fire also impacted the air quality throughout the fire zone and in neighboring portions of Nevada. The fire has resulted in $8.7 million in damages as of July 23, 2021.

=== Evacuations and closures ===
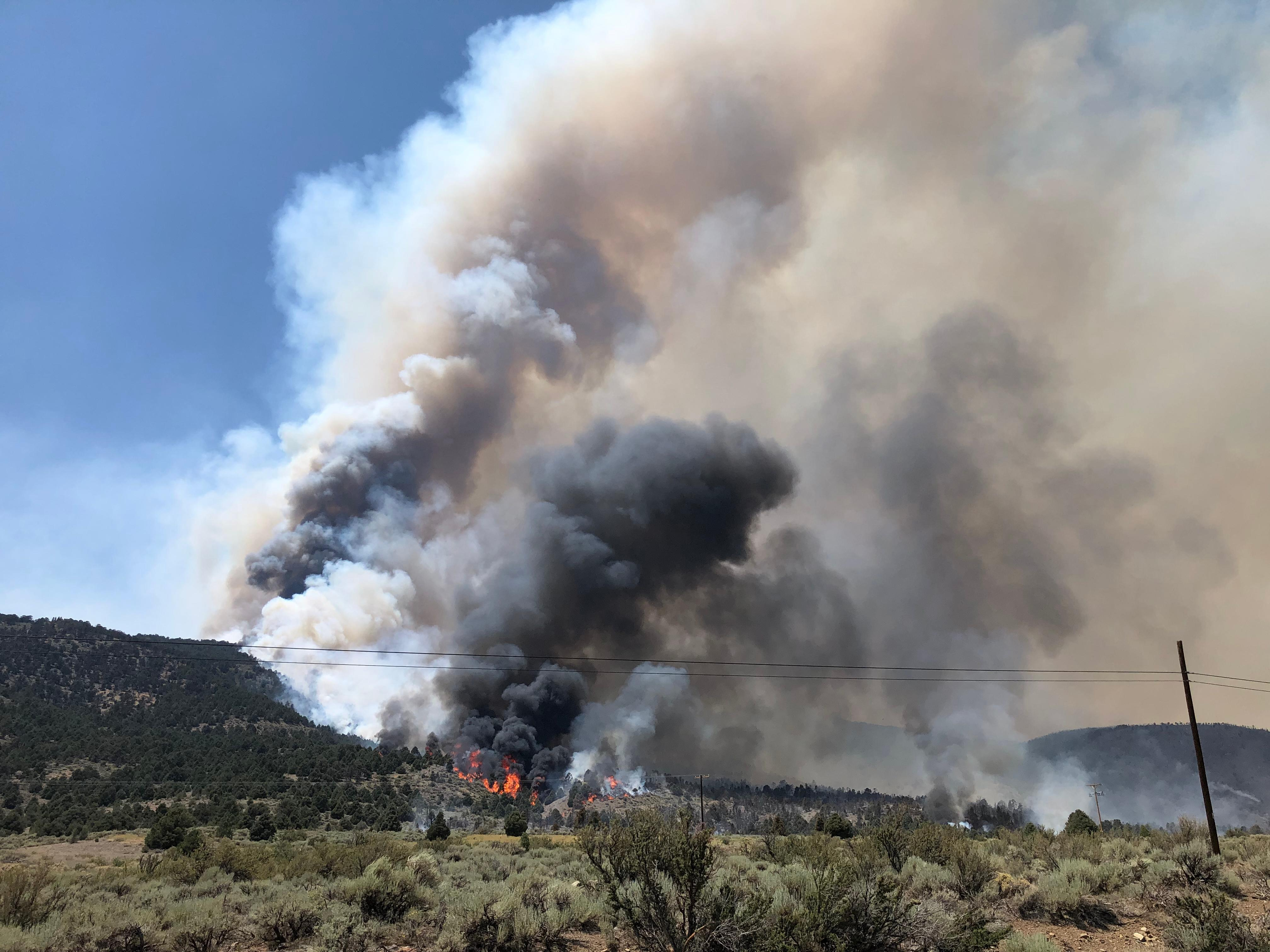
The Tamarack Fire burning in the Topaz Lake area. Topaz Lake was under mandatory evacuation at one point due to the fire's threat.

The Tamarack Fire resulted in the evacuation of 2,439 people and numerous communities in Alpine County, California, including Alpine Village, Markleeville, Mesa Vista and Woodfords, starting July 16 and July 17. The Early Learning Center in Markleeville was used briefly as an evacuation center until it was required to evacuate. Alpine County School in Paynesville was used as an evacuation center until it was required to evacuate to the Douglas County Senior Center in Gardnerville, Nevada. On July 30, the final evacuation orders were lifted for Alpine County.

It also resulted in the evacuation of Topaz Lake, Nevada on July 22. In Douglas County, the County Senior Center and Topaz Ranch Estates Community Center served as evacuation centers initially. When Topaz Ranch was required to evacuate, Smith Valley High School opened as an evacuation center. The Douglas County Fairgrounds was also opened, along with the Carson City Fairgrounds, to house large animals. Evacuation orders began to be lifted for residents of most communities starting July 26 with the majority of orders being lifted by July 28.

Portions of Highway 395, Highway 88, Highway 89 and Highway 4 were closed for periods of time, either due to direct impact from the fire itself, or to allow for ease of access by fire crews. All roads, with exception to select Forest Service roads, were reopened on July 28.

The fire has also impacted recreational activities in the area, which is reliant on tourism and recreation economically. The Forest Service required campgrounds in the immediate fire area to evacuate. Grover Hot Springs State Park was evacuated. It was reopened for camping in June 2022 but the actual Hot Springs remains closed. A a portion of the Pacific Crest Trail was closed until July 31. The Forest Service also closed all areas, including campgrounds, trails, and roads, in the Tamarack Fire footprint within the Carson Ranger District.

=== Air quality ===
Carson Valley and Lake Tahoe suffered extremely poor air quality due to the fire's activity and growth, including smoke and ash fall. On June 23, smoke from the Dixie Fire, burning further north in Plumas and Butte Counties in California, entered the Tamarack Fire area, causing further air quality deterioration, impacting both firefighting activity and the health of local residents. Additionally, smoke from the Tamarack Fire, along with smoke from other fires in California, Montana, Oregon and Canada, was pushed east, impacting air quality as far away as New York City.

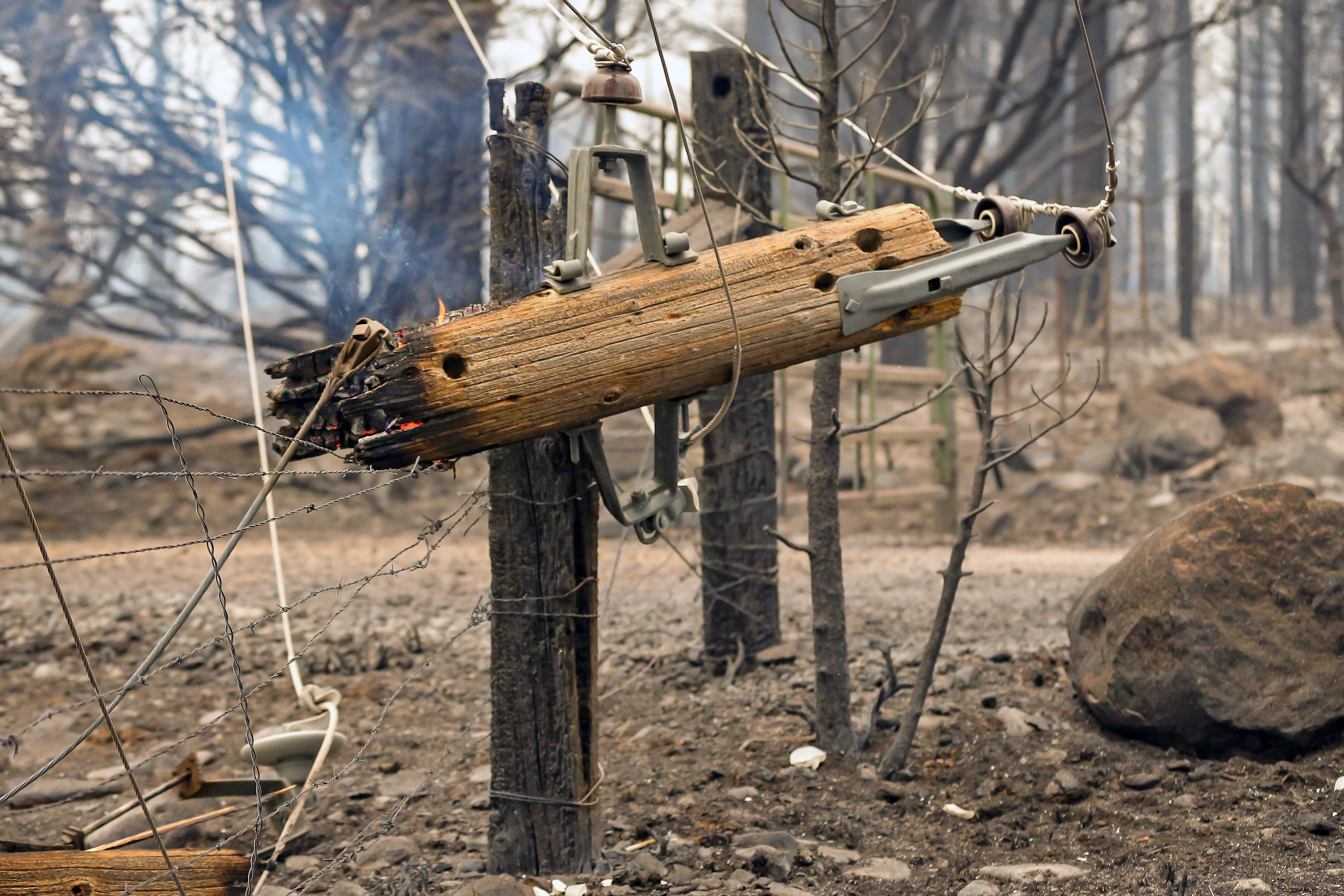
One of over 30 utility poles burned by the Tamarack Fire.

=== Infrastructure ===
A total of 23 structures were destroyed as a result of the fire. A reported thirteen structures were destroyed or damaged in Douglas County, Nevada, including at least eight houses destroyed and three damaged. Douglas County structure losses also include a motor home, a commercial structure, and five utility and maintenance structures. On the California side, three buildings were reported destroyed.

In Alpine County, more than half of the county's residents were without power due to the fire. NV Energy turned off power for a portion of the Douglas County fire area on July 22. They re-energized select areas on July 24. Over 30 power poles were destroyed in the area resulting in a delay in power restoration. Due to the extensive damage sustained in the 2021 Tamarack Fire and subsequent flooding in 2022, Indian Creek Campground is closed and will remain closed until the area can be made safe for public access.

== Gallery ==
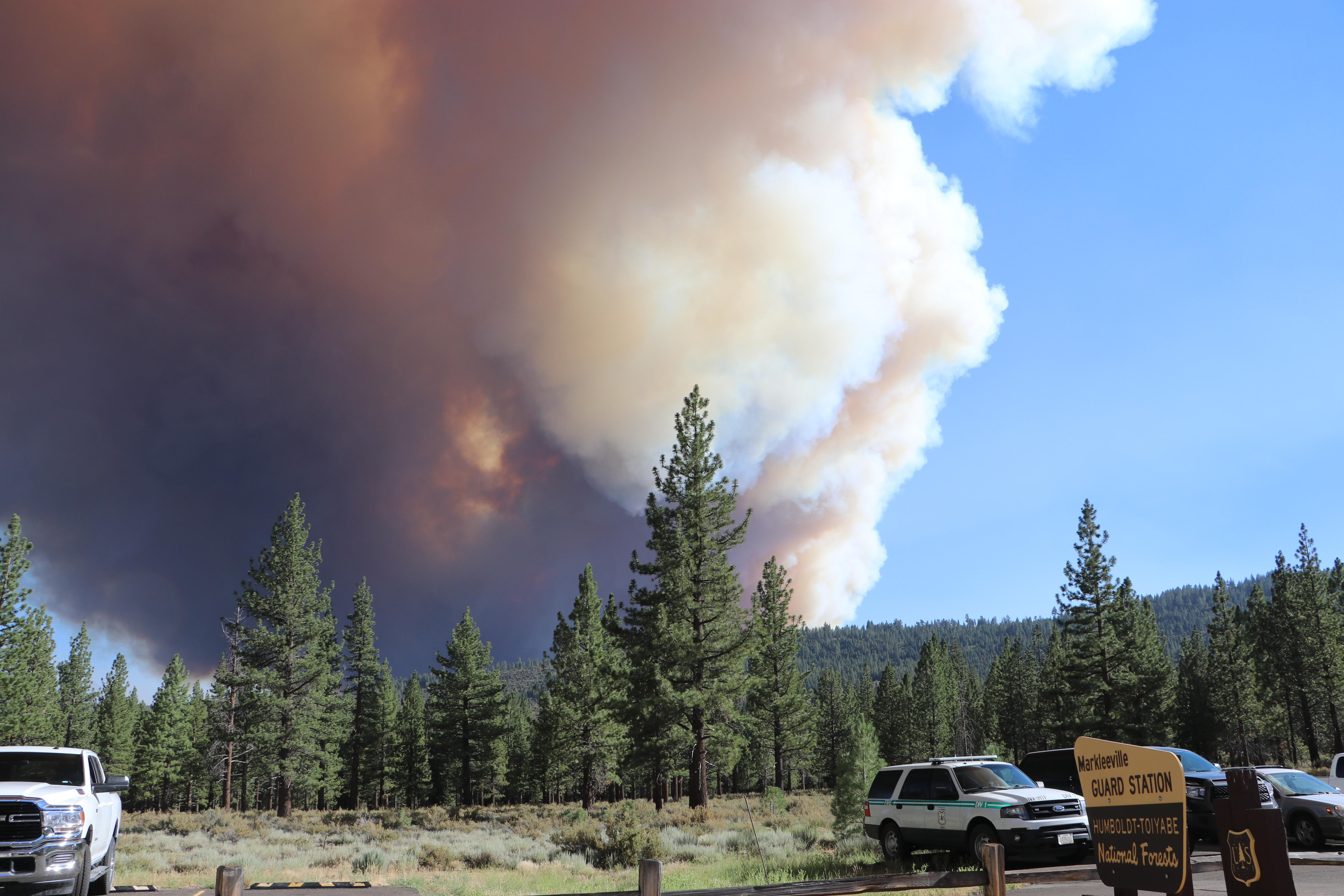
The fire from Markleeville on July 17.

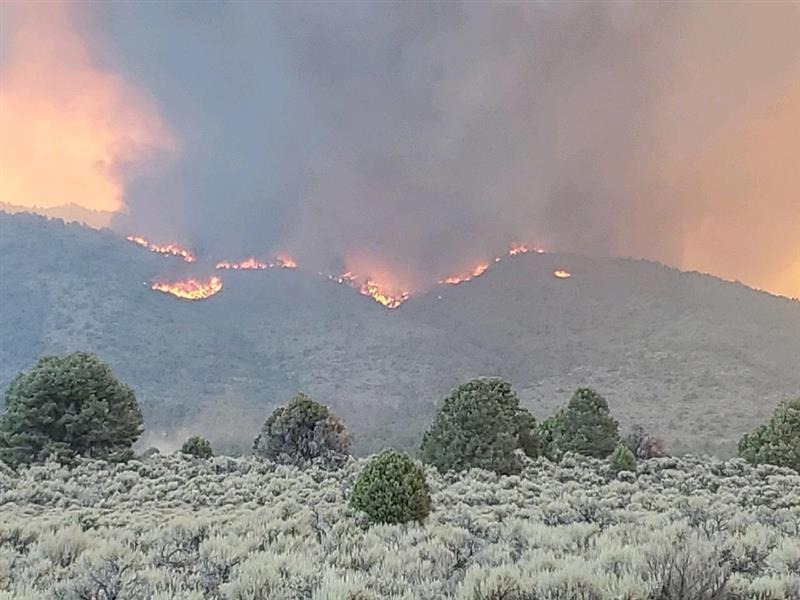
The fire burning just west of Highway 395 on July 21.

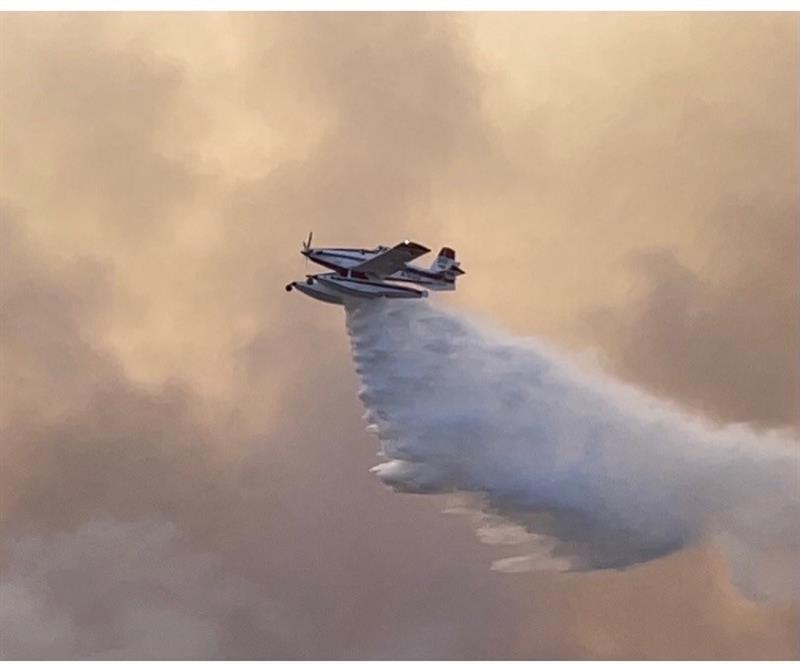
An air tanker releases water over the fire on July 22.

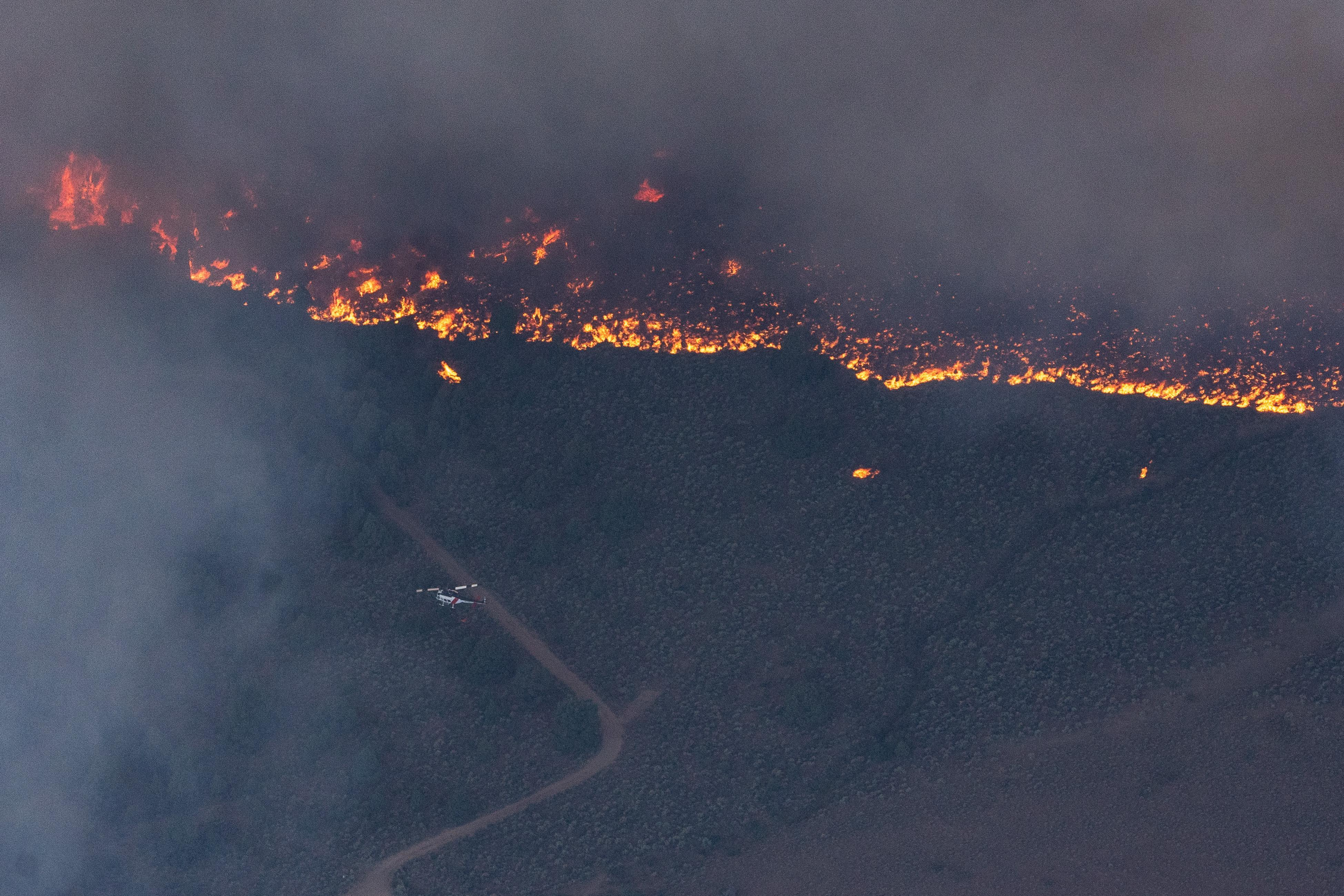
A helicopter circles the fire on July 22.

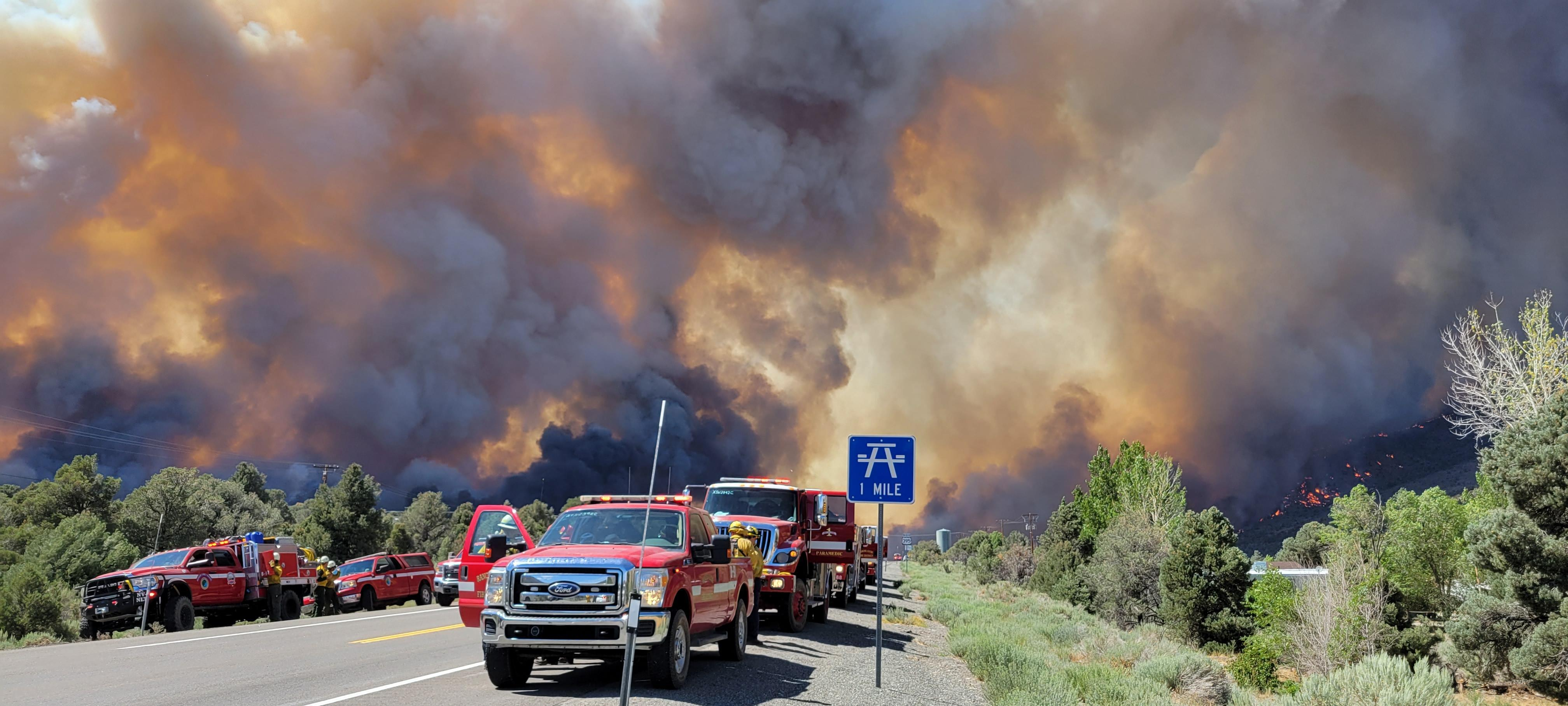
Fire seen from Highway 395 on July 22.

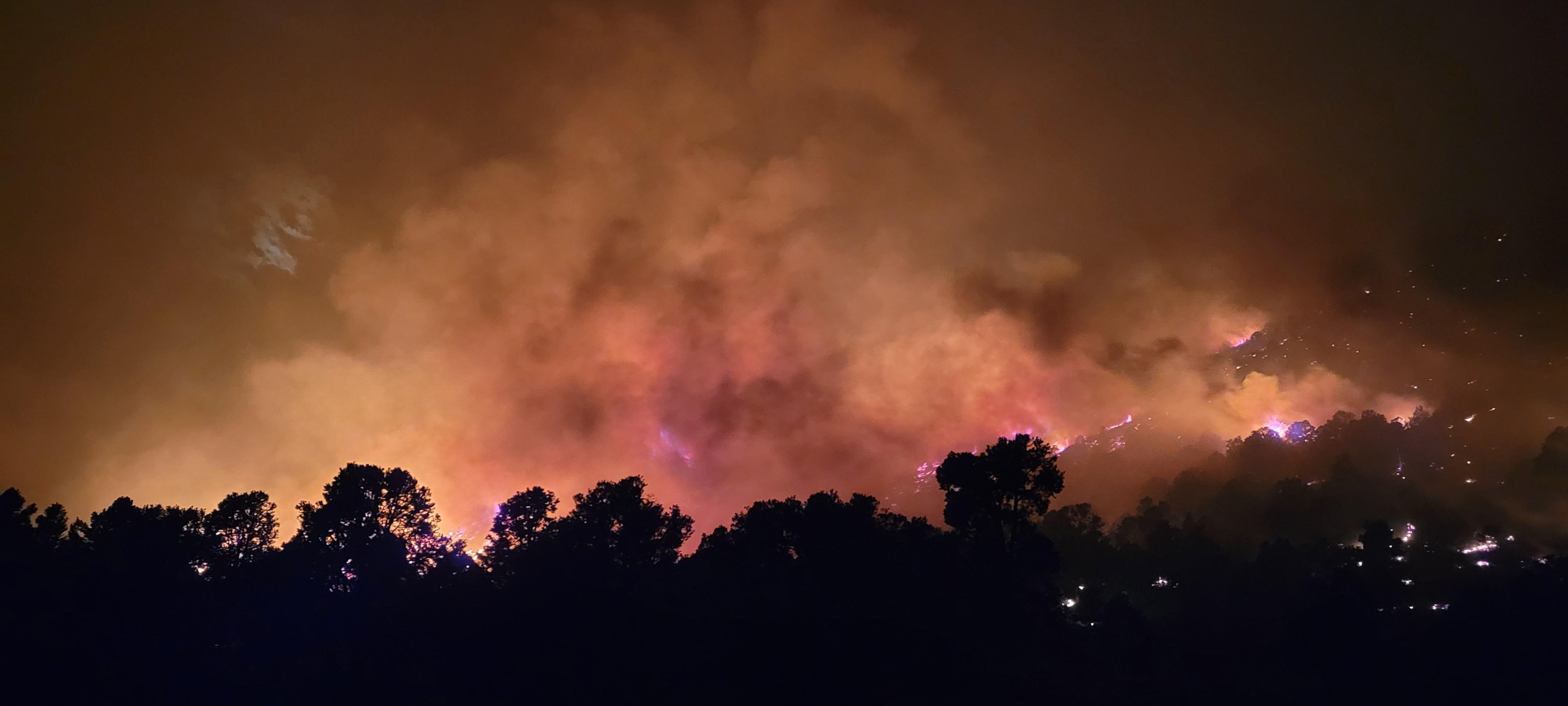
The fire on the evening of July 22 from Highway 395.

An air tanker dropping fire retardant near Holbrook Highlands in Nevada

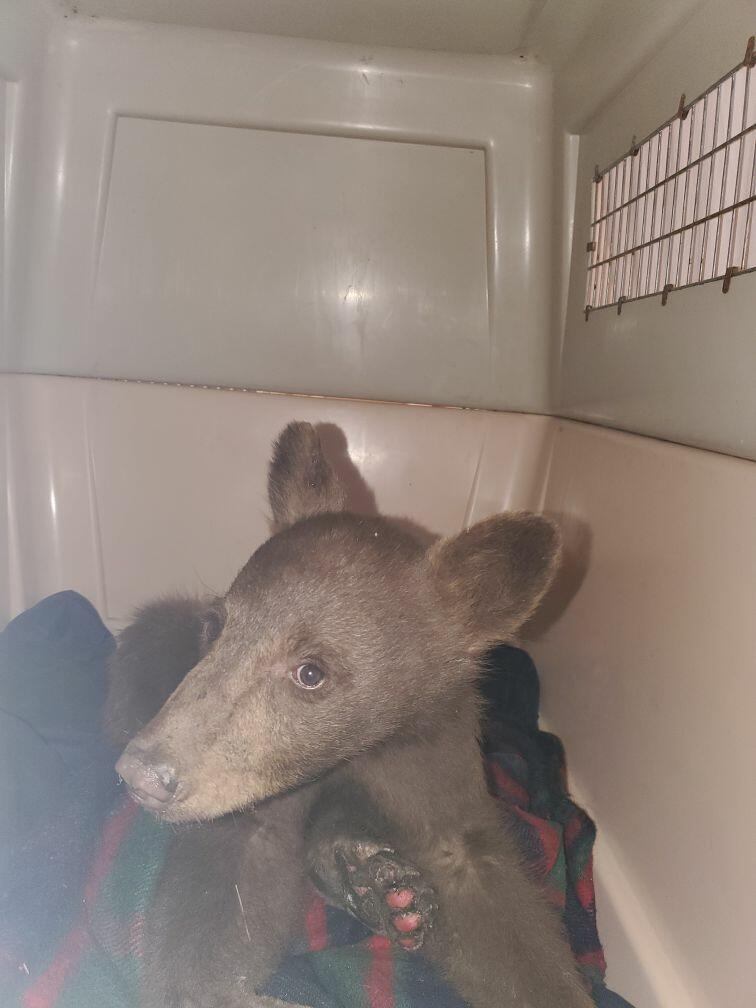
An injured black bear cub injured in the fire and rescued in Markleeville on July 25.

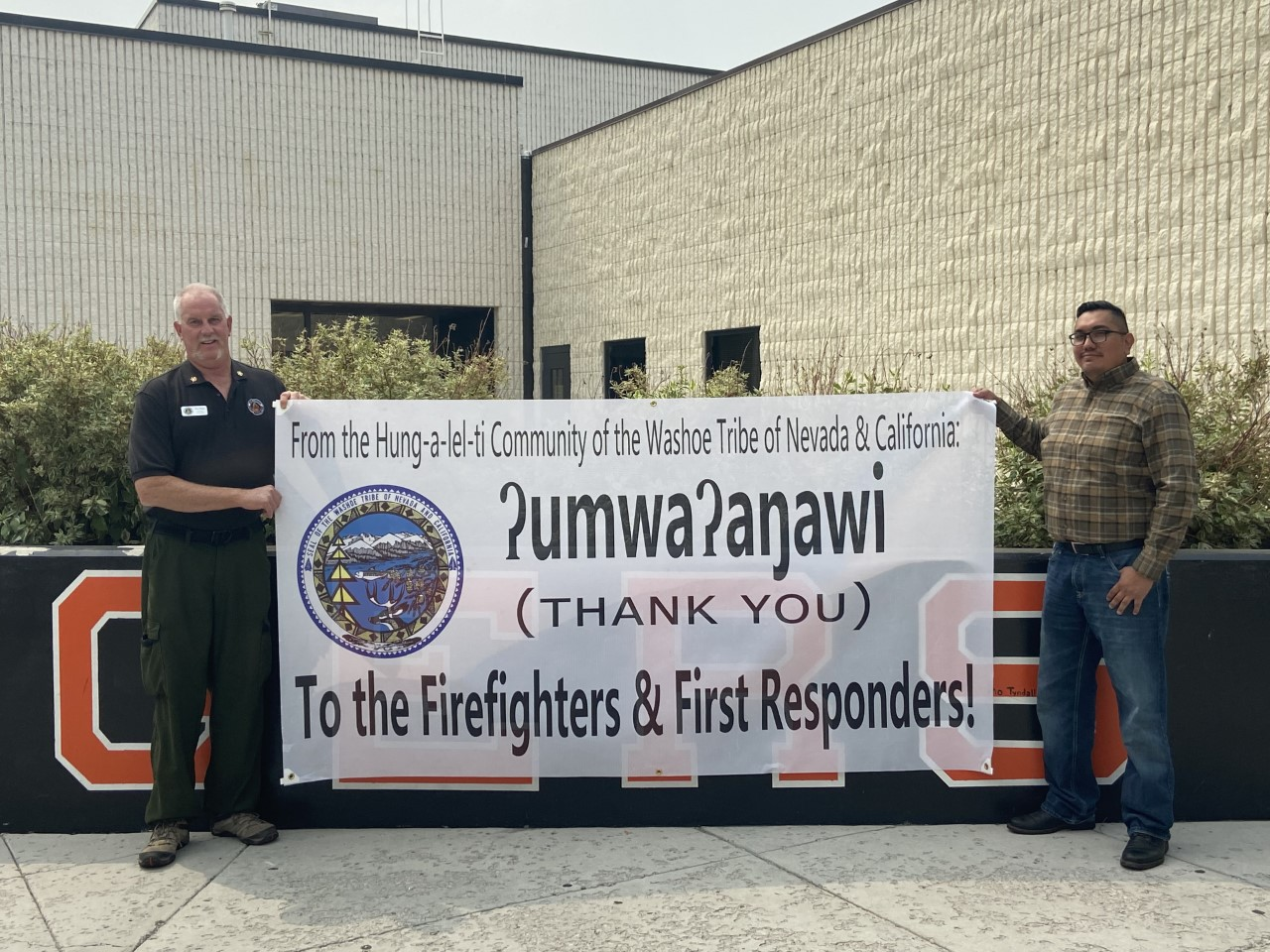
Washoe Tribal chairman Serrell Smokey (right) thanks firefighters and first responders on behalf of the Washoe Tribe of Nevada and California on July 26.

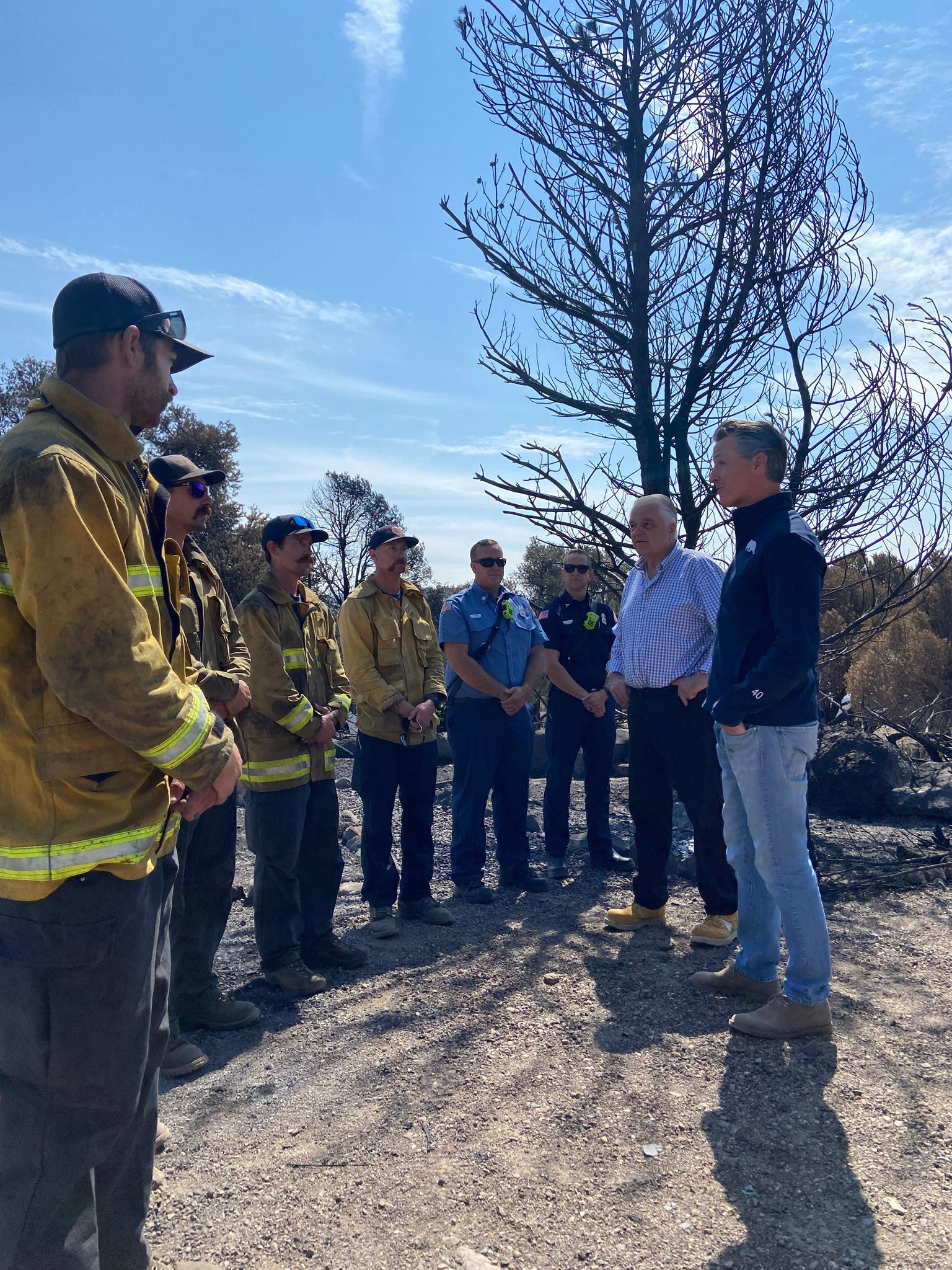
Nevada governor Steve Sisolak and California governor Gavin Newsom visiting fire crews on July 28, 2021.
