= Alpine County Unified School District =

School district in Alpine County, California

Address
- 43 Hawkside Dr. Markleeville, California, 96120; United States

District information
- Grades: K–12
- Superintendent: Matt Strahl
- Schools: 3
- NCES District ID: 0602070

Students and staff
- Enrollment: 70
- Teachers: 7.50 (on an FTE basis)
- Student–teacher ratio: 10.67

Other information
- Website: alpinecoe.k12.ca.us

Alpine County Unified School district is the public school district serving Alpine County, the least populated county in California, in the Sierra Nevada. It has a total enrollment of under 100 pupils.

It operates Diamond Valley Elementary in Markleeville, which is the largest school, having 66 students in the 2019–2020 academic year; as well as Bear Valley Elementary in Bear Valley, which had four students in the same year; Alpine County Opportunity School in Woodfords, which had no students traditionally enrolled, but operates an online learning program; and Alpine County Community Day School, also in Woodfords, which serves expelled students, students on probation, and other students with special circumstances. Due to the county's low population density, high school students generally transfer to other districts for grades 9–12, either Douglas County School District in Nevada or Lake Tahoe Unified School District in El Dorado County, California.

The racial breakdown is as follows: 51% Native American, 37% white, 7% Multiracial, and 3% Hispanic or Latino.
