= Alpine County Airport =

- IATA: none; ICAO: none; FAA LID: M45

Summary
- Airport type: Public
- Owner: Alpine County
- Serves: Markleeville, California
- Elevation AMSL: 5,867 ft (1,788 m)
- Coordinates: 38°44′05″N 119°46′01″W
- Interactive map of Alpine County Airport

Runways
Direction	Length		Surface
Direction	ft	m	Surface
17/35	4,443	1,354	Asphalt

Statistics (2007)
- Aircraft operations: 650
- Source: Federal Aviation Administration

Alpine County Airport (FAA LID: M45) is a county-owned public-use airport located three nautical miles (6 km) north of the central business district of Markleeville, in Alpine County, California, United States.

It is in the eastern Sierra Nevada range and serves as a general aviation airport. The airport has a single runway, with an apron to park small light aircraft. The airport has no buildings, no lights and is rarely used, averaging only 54 aircraft movements per month.

It is the only operational airport in Alpine County.

== Facilities and aircraft ==
Alpine County Airport covers an area of 300 acres (120 ha) at an elevation of 5,867 feet (1,788 m) above mean sea level. It has one asphalt paved runway, designated 17/35, which measures 4,443 by 50 feet (1,354 x 15 m). For the 12-month period ending August 15, 2007, the airport had 650 aircraft operations, an average of 54 per month, all of which were general aviation.

The airport is closed during snow, due to no snow removal. Runway 17/35 is limited to 4800 lb single wheel and 9600 lb dual wheel aircraft.
