= Paynesville =

Paynesville may refer to:

Australia

- Paynesville, Victoria
- Paynesville, Western Australia

Liberia

- Paynesville, Liberia

United States

- Paynesville, California
- Paynesville, Indiana
- Paynesville, Minnesota
- Paynesville, Missouri
- Paynesville Township, Stearns County, Minnesota

== See also ==
- Painesville, Ohio
- Lake City, Nevada County, California, also called Painesville
