= Fredericksburg, California =

Unincorporated community in California, United States

Fredericksburg
- Unincorporated community
- Location in California Fredericksburg (the United States)
- Coordinates: 38°49′44″N 119°47′13″W
- Country: United States
- State: California
- County: Alpine
- Elevation: 5,072 ft (1,546 m)

Population
  - Total: 72

Fredericksburg (also Frederickburg and Fredricksburg) is an unincorporated community in Alpine County, California, United States. It is located 4 miles (6.4 km) north-northeast of Woodfords, at an elevation of 5072 feet (1546 m).

The town developed in the 1860s. A post office operated at Fredericksburg from 1898 to 1911.

== Name ==
The town was started in 1864 and may have been named for Frederick Frevert, who operated a sawmill nearby.

== History ==
The settlement began in the 1860s when German settler Frederick Buns began farming in the area. The farm became a stopover for travelers heading towards California and supplied milk and apples to mining towns as far away as Virginia City, Nevada. Several other German families settled in the community. A hotel opened but became the site of the school in 1881. A small brushfire in 1986 destroyed some old buildings. Fredericksburg has remained a small agricultural community.
