= Stonewall Nation =

Plan to create a gay separatist community in California in 1970

Stonewall Nation was the informal name given to a proposition by gay activists to establish a separatist community in Alpine County, California in 1970. The small population of the county and the election rules for California counties at the time suggested to these activists that if they could induce a relatively small number of gay people to move to the county, they could recall the county government and replace it with an all-gay slate.

The plan did not gain traction in the LGBT community and a right-wing Christian minister announced plans to move large numbers of Christians to the county to counteract any attempt by gay people to take over the county government. The plan was abandoned about a year after it was conceived and the idea has come to be seen as a practical joke.

== Alpine County ==
State map of California highlighting Alpine County

In 1970, Alpine County had a population of about 430 people, with 367 registered voters. Under a recent California Supreme Court ruling, new county residents could register to vote after 90 days in residence. Activist Don Jackson presented his idea for taking over the county at a December 28, 1969 gay liberation conference in Berkeley, California. He was inspired by gay activist and writer Carl Wittman, who wrote in his "Gay Manifesto", "To be a free territory, we must govern ourselves, set up our own institutions, defend ourselves....Rural retreats, political action offices...they must be developed if we are to have even the shadow of a free territory." (Note: New York activist Craig Schoonmaker developed his own plan for a free gay territory, suggesting that LGBT people establish majorities in Manhattan's 19th and 20th Congressional districts and elect openly gay members of Congress from this "First Gay-Power District" (Teal, p. 292).) He (incorrectly) suggested that if as few as 200 gay people moved to Alpine County, they would constitute a majority of registered voters. Taking over the county government, he said, would result in:

"a gay government, a gay civil service...the world's first gay university, partially paid for by the state...the world's first museum of gay arts, sciences and history...[and a] free county health service and hospital..."

These things would be partially paid for through property taxes and state and federal subsidies. The Los Angeles chapter of the Gay Liberation Front assumed responsibility for the project, which became informally known as "Stonewall Nation".

In the fall of 1970, a member of the Metropolitan Community Church, an LGBT-interest church founded in Los Angeles, bought a five-acre lot in the county and wrote a report on the feasibility of the project. According to the "Alpine Report", while many were apathetic, some county residents expressed active hostility to the idea (to the point of threatening violence) while others, believing that the current county government was unresponsive, would welcome any change. Nonetheless, the report urged caution, noting that a mass move into the county would probably trigger a backlash. The report counseled moving people in a few at a time over a long period of time to allow current residents time to adapt to the changing circumstances.

According to gay rights activist Craig Rodwell, after the takeover of Alpine County was effected, work to take over the entire adjacent state of Nevada would begin by using the same process, only then involving tens of thousands of gay men and lesbians.

== Opposition ==
The Alpine County Board of Supervisors was gravely worried by the takeover plan. "We are all very concerned," said board chairman Herbert Bruns. "Naturally, we'll do everything we can to prevent anyone taking over our county." Members of the board met with then-Governor Ronald Reagan's assistant secretary for legal affairs, hoping for state assistance in resisting a takeover. The Reagan official advised the delegation that there was nothing that the state could do as long as the GLF followed the law. Activist Don Kilhefner expressed amazement that state or county officials would be concerned, saying, "We are simply following the advice of President Nixon and Spiro Agnew to work within the electoral process." County residents hoped that the cold weather and the lack of jobs in the county would deter gay people from moving. Carl McIntire, a right-wing fundamentalist Christian minister, announced that he would move hundreds of "missionaries" to Alpine County to stop any attempt by gay people to effect the plan.

Support within the LGBT community was slow to materialize. Lesbian journalist and author Martha Shelley stated, "A lot of us said, 'OK, let's get real.' I mean, blacks outnumbered us ten times over, and they made no headway at getting their own separate piece of land." Similarly, homophile activist and journalist Jack Nichols said "I never thought of it as a serious proposal. Sure, a lot of gays wanted to live in an all gay world...[b]ut creating an entirely new all-gay society with no connections to the dominant straight society whatsoever? That just wasn't going to happen." Gay liberation groups and publications, including Red Butterfly and Gay Flames, criticized the plan, stating that gay separatism was not a workable strategy. The Berkeley chapter of the GLF withdrew from the project, calling it "sexist" and "counter-revolutionary". Despite announcing in November 1970 that it had close to 500 people ready to move, in February 1971, the GLF released a statement that it was abandoning Alpine County for a warmer climate. It has since been suggested that the entire Stonewall Nation idea was a hoax perpetrated by the Los Angeles GLF to generate mainstream publicity.

== See also ==
- Van Dykes - lesbian separatists
- Free State Project - a libertarian political migration movement
