= Silver Mountain, California =

Silver Mountain
- Former settlement
- Location in California
- Coordinates: 38°36′19″N 119°46′10″W
- Country: United States
- State: California
- County: Alpine
- Elevation: 6,411 ft (1,954 m)

Silver Mountain (also Kongsberg, Konigsberg, Köngsberg and Silver Mountain City) is a former settlement in Alpine County, California, United States. It was located on Silver Creek, 5 miles (8 km) north-northeast of Ebbetts Pass, at an elevation of 6411 feet (1954 m).

Silver Mountain was founded in 1858 by Norwegian miners who named the place Köngsberg or Konigsberg. Within a year, the town had a population of around 3,000. The Konigsberg post office opened in 1863, closed a while in 1864, was renamed Silver Mountain in 1865, and closed for good in 1883. By 1886, the mines were no longer productive and the town was abandoned.

Silver Mountain was the first county seat of Alpine County, when the county was formed in 1864. The county seat was moved to Markleeville in 1875.
