= Washoe Tribe of Nevada and California =

Federally recognized tribe in Nevada and California, U.S.

Total population
- 1,116 (1990s)

Regions with significant populations
- United States (California, Nevada)

Languages
- English, Washo

Religion
- traditional tribal religion, Native American Church, previously Ghost Dance

Related ethnic groups
- Northern Paiute, Miwok, Maidu, and Nisenan

The Washoe Tribe of Nevada and California are a federally recognized tribe of Washoe Indians, living in the U.S. states of California and Nevada. There are several Washoe communities south and east of Lake Tahoe united under a tribal council. The Washoe people own over 64,300 acres (26,000 ha) in public domain allotments (PDA); PDAs are land reserved out of the public domain for use by an Indian person or family, but unlike reservations, Tribal governments hold no jurisdiction over them. Nevertheless, PDAs are a consistent part of Indian Country.

== Government ==
The tribe is headquartered in Gardnerville, Nevada, and governed by a democratically elected twelve-member tribal council and chairman, which meet on a monthly basis. Chairmen serve four-year terms.

The current administration is:

- Chairman: Serrell Smokey
- Vice-chairman: Rueben Vasquez
- Secretary/Treasurer: Autumn Burtt
- Carson Colony Council Members: Roger McDonald and Chad Malone
- Dresslerville Community Council Members: Rueben Vasquez and Herman Fillmore
- Off-Reservation Council Members: Jeanine Jim-Bluehorse and Helen Fillmore
- Reno-Sparks Council Member: Lorraine Keller
- Stewart Community Council Members: Blain Osorio and Darrel Kizer
- Woodfords Community Council Members: Irvin Jim and Shannon Guerrero.

== Communities ==
=== Carson Colony ===
Established in 1917, the 16-acre (6.5 ha) community had 275 resident members in 1991. This colony is located in Carson City, Nevada and owns a gymnasium for recreation, youth programs, and hosting tribal events. The colony has four community representatives.

=== Dresslerville Colony ===
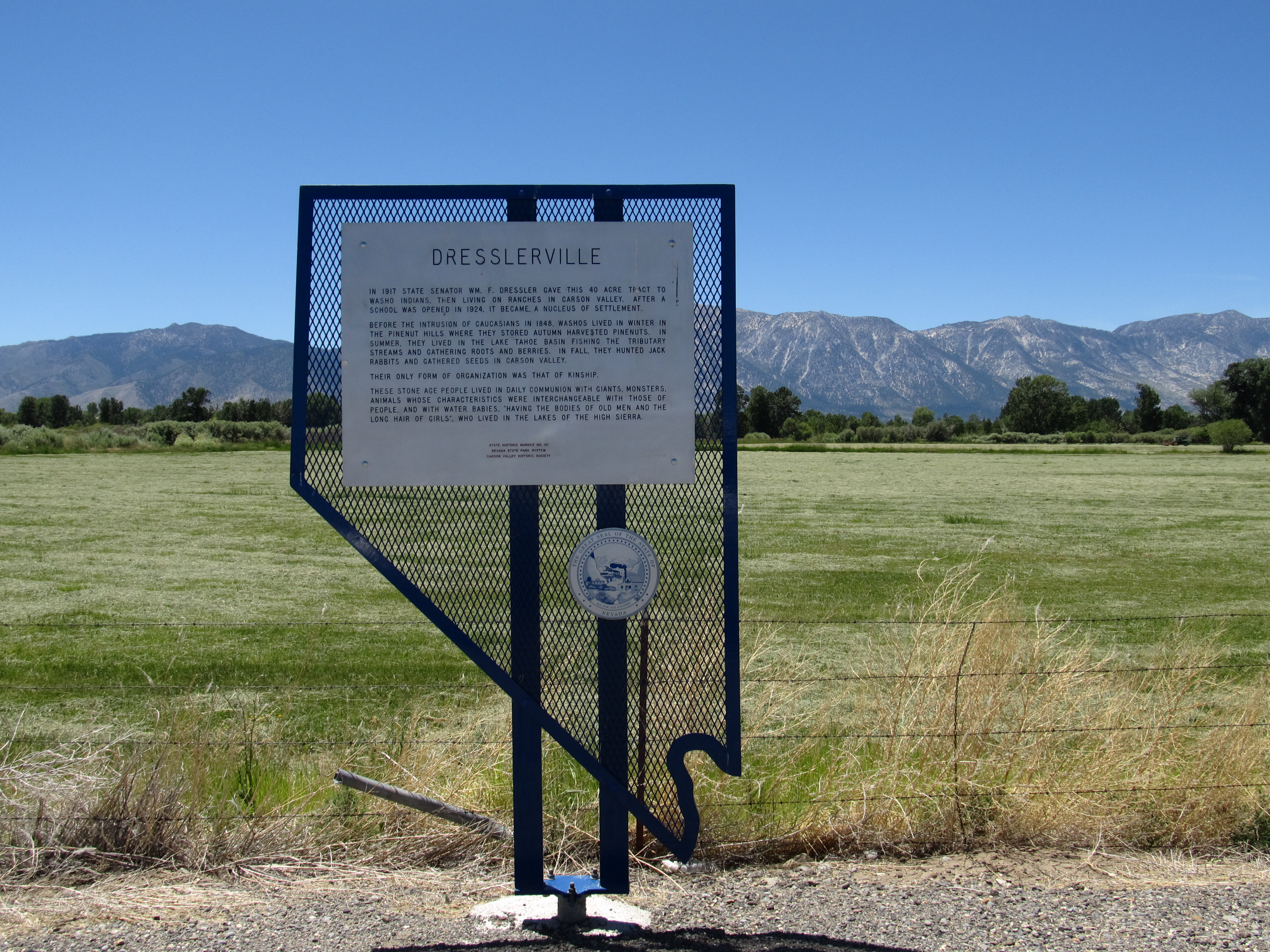
Dresslerville historical marker

The Dresslerville Colony is the largest Washoe community in population. 348 members lived there in 1991. It is located on 90 acres (36 ha) in Gardnerville near the Gardnerville Ranchos. Most of the tribe's public buildings are here, including a community center, gymnasium, and park. They have five community representatives.

=== Stewart Community ===
Located at the south side of Carson City, this community was established in 1890, has 2,960 acres (1,200 ha), with 90 members. They have the Stewart Community Center. Their five community representatives are chaired by Wanda Batchelor.

=== Washoe Ranch ===
This 95-acre (38 ha) ranch in Carson Valley was purchased by the tribe in 1938 and 1940. There the tribe collectively raised hogs, sheep, and a herd of dairy cows. They grew potatoes and peaches. When farm production decreased in the 1950s, the land was temporarily leased to non-Native farmers.

=== Woodfords Community (Hung-A-Lel-Ti) ===
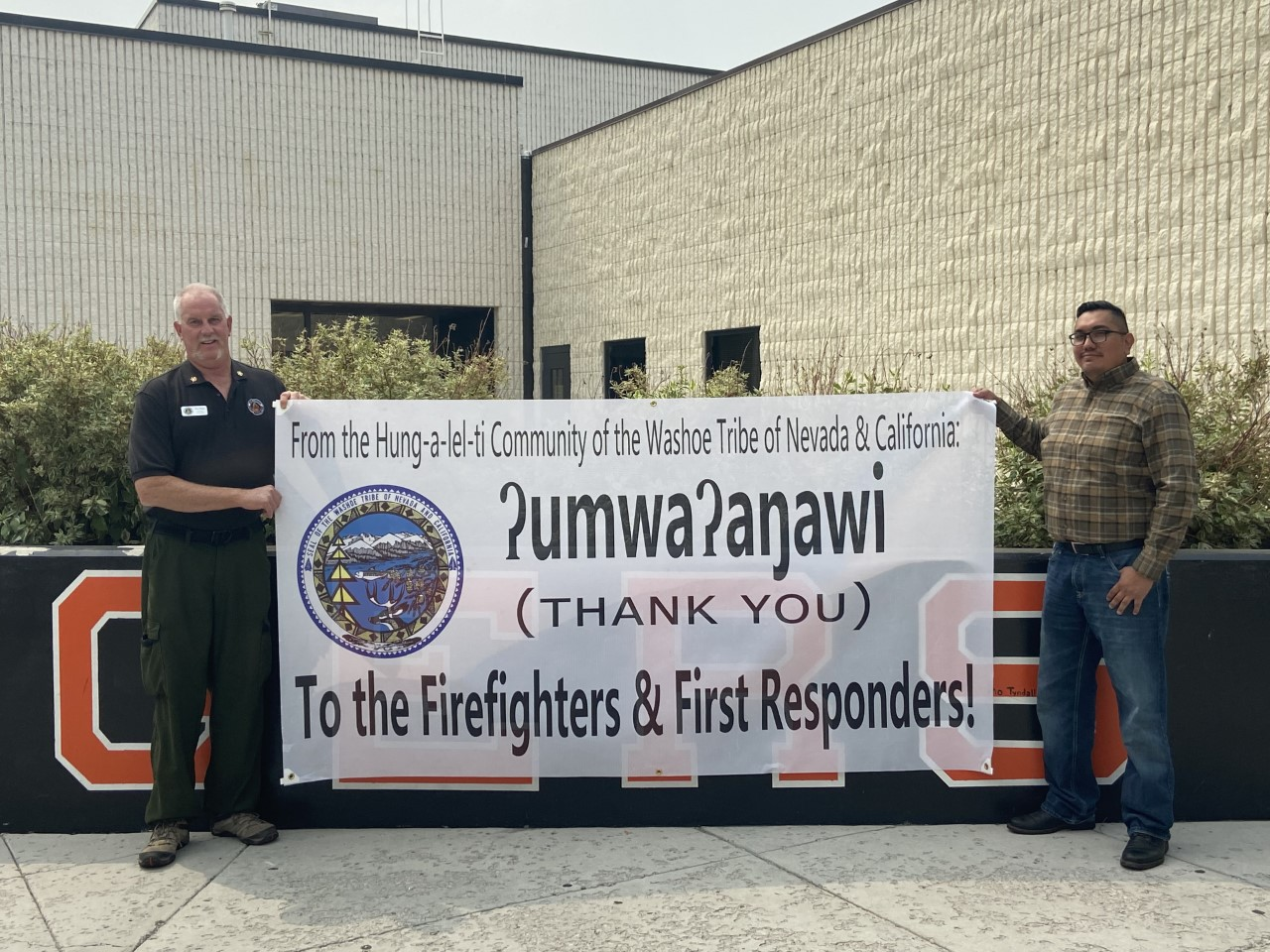
The Washoe thank firefighters and first responders for protecting Hung-A-Lel-Ti during the Tamarack Fire. Serrell Smokey, chairman, Washoe Tribe of Nevada & California, is on the right.

The only community in California, Woodfords Community is located near Markleeville. Its Washoe name is "Hung A Lel Ti." It includes the Woodfords Indian Education Center and a community center. Their five community representatives are chaired by DeAnn Roberts. Established in 1970, the 80-acre (32 ha) community had 338 resident members in 1991. As of the 2010 Census the population was 214. In July 2021, Hung-A-Lel-Ti was evacuated for seven days due to the Tamarack Fire. The community was successfully protected from the fire.

The California Gold Rush brought an influx of European-American settlers in the mid-19th century. Calls for the establishment of a Washoe reservation and compensation for lost resources, such as the piñon crop, were ignored by the US in the late 19th century. Under the Dawes Act of 1887, Washoes lands were broken up into individual allotments; however, instead of the tribe retaining valuable lands in the Pine Nut Mountains, the allotted sections were typically barren lands with little access to water.

In the early 20th century, Washoes worked as ranch hands, as construction workers, domestic servants, or laundry workers. Cattle ranchers leased Washoe land for minimal amounts of money. In 1917, the US government, despite local protest, purchased a tract of land for the Washoe, that became the Carson Colony. William F. Dressler donated 40 acres (16 ha), also in 1917, that became the Dresslerville Colony. The novel Rabbit Boss by Thomas Sanchez depicts the evolving circumstances of tribal members over a 100-year span ending in the mid-20th century.

Under the Indian Reorganization Act, the colonies in the Carson Valley area wrote a new constitution and by-laws, which they ratified on December 16, 1935. They gained federal recognition on January 24, 1936.

In 1948, the tribe began preparing a case for the Indian Claims Commission. They filed Washoe Case #288 before the ICC in 1951, asking for $43.8 million for land, fishing and hunting rights, minerals, and timber that had been wrongly taken from the tribe, plus interest accrued since 1863. The case was finally settled in 1970, when the tribe was only awarded $5 million.

In the 1960s, John Henry Dressler helped to form the Inter-Tribal Council of Nevada, a liaison between tribal, state, and federal agencies. Since 1966, the council has nine representatives: two from Dresslerville Colony, two from Woodfords Colony, one from the Washoe of Reno-Sparks Indian Colony, and two from off-reservation areas.

Location of Carson Colony in Nevada

Location of Dresslerville Colony in Nevada

Location of Stewart Community in Nevada

Location of Washoe Ranch in Nevada

Location of Woodfords Community in California

== See also ==
- Louisa Keyser, Dat So La Lee (1829–1925), master basket maker
- Reno-Sparks Indian Colony
- Susanville Indian Rancheria
- Washoe people
