= Alpine County, California =

County in California, United States

Coordinates: 38.58°N 119.80°W

Alpine County
- County
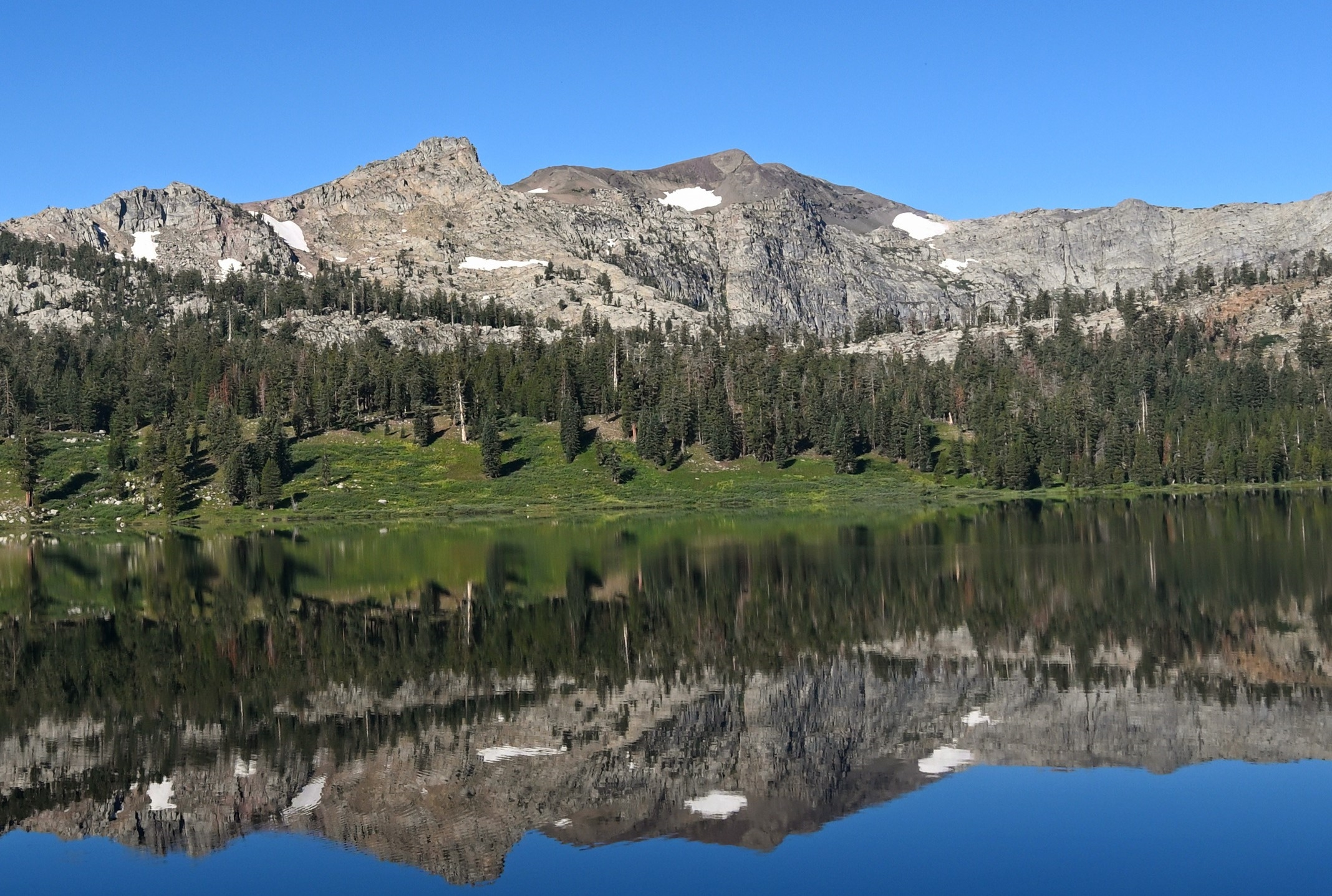
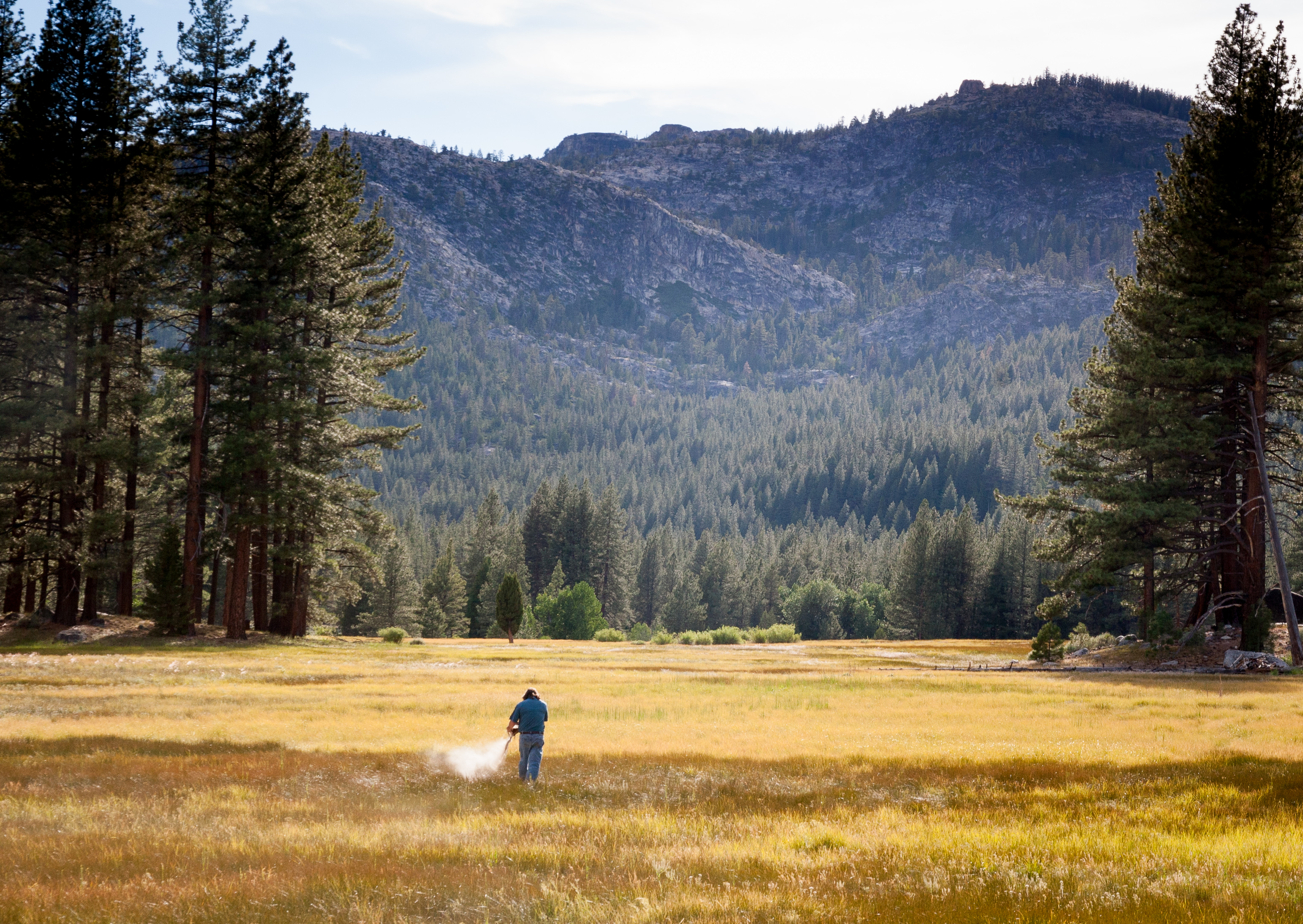
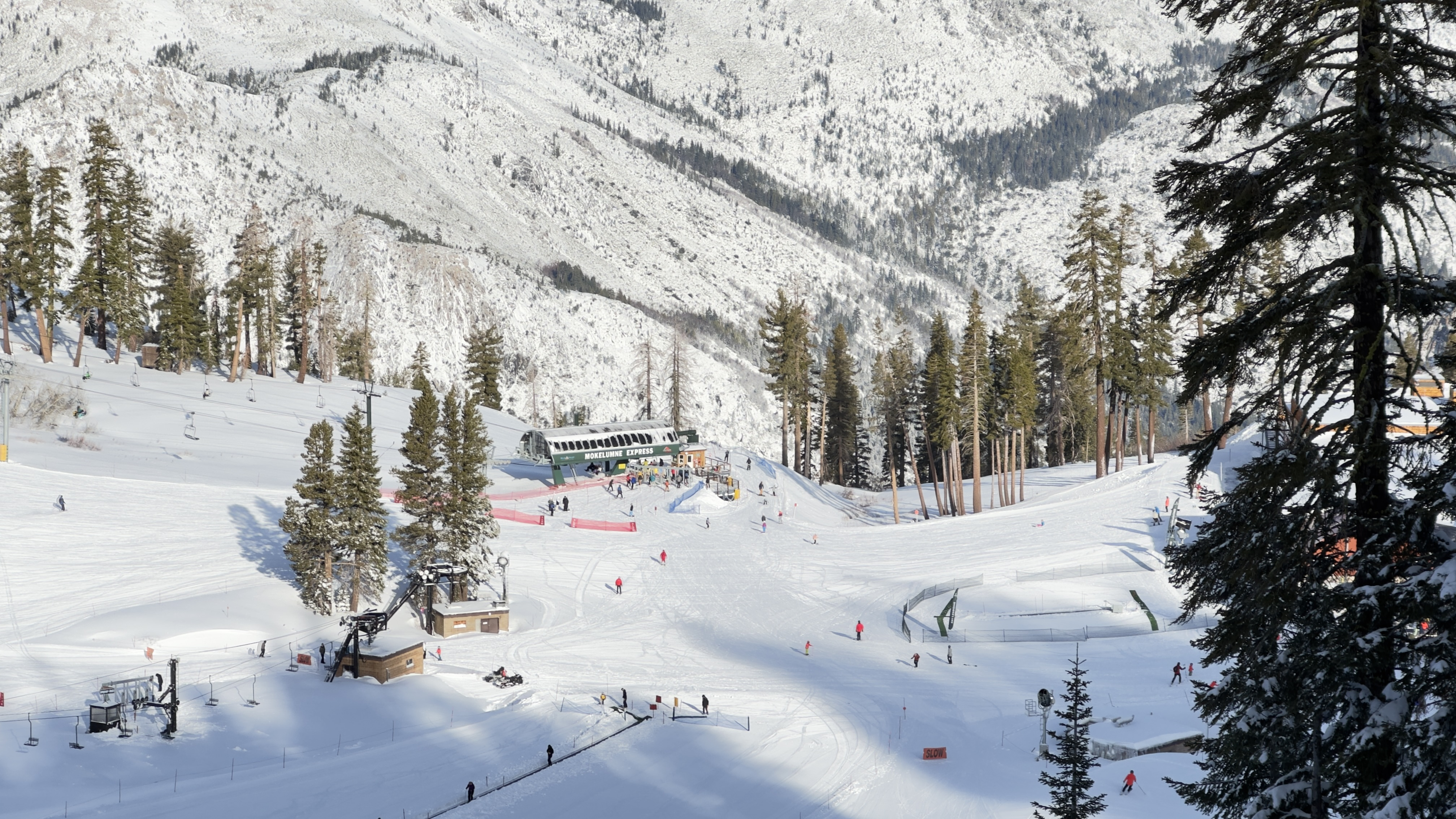
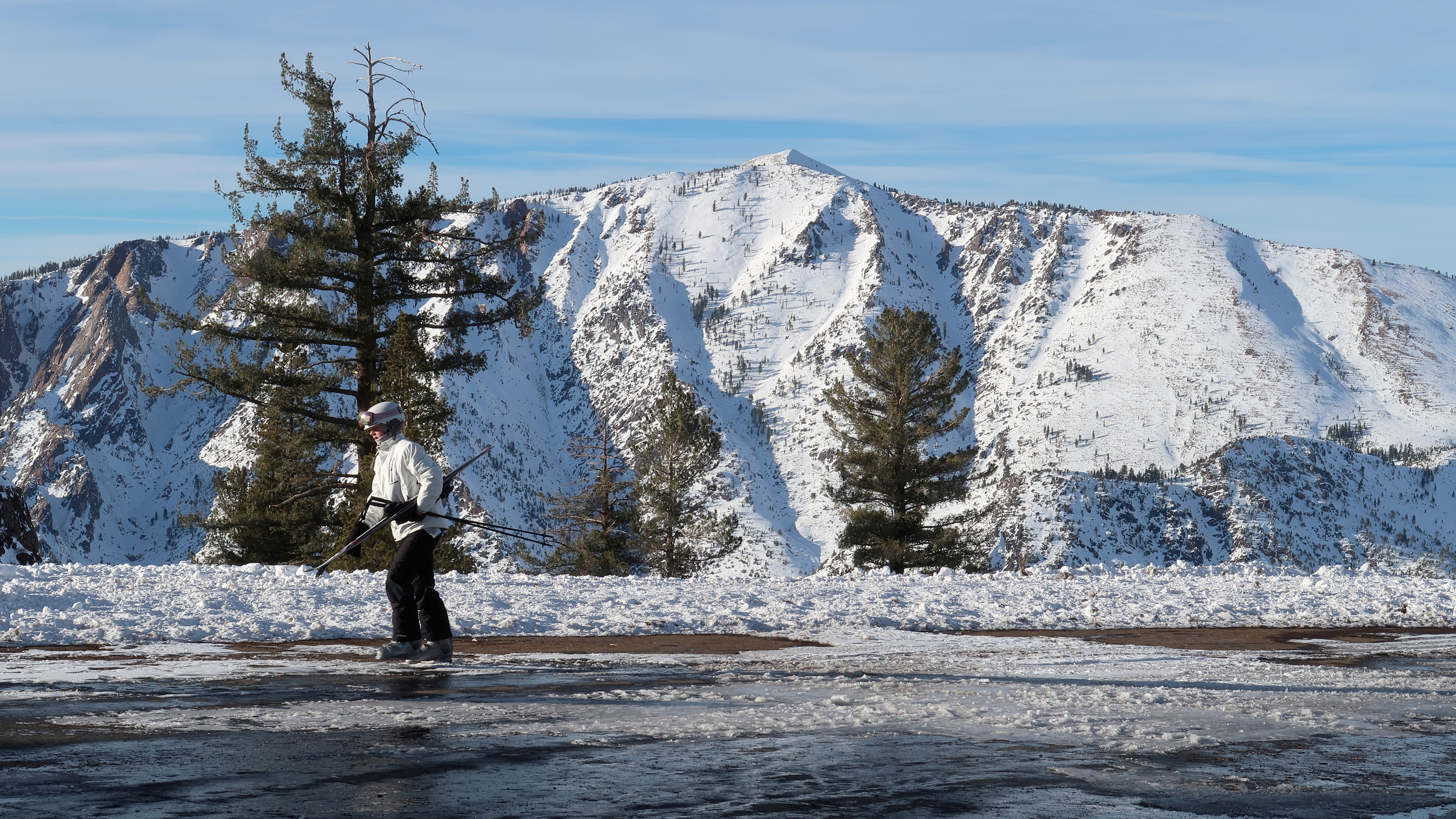
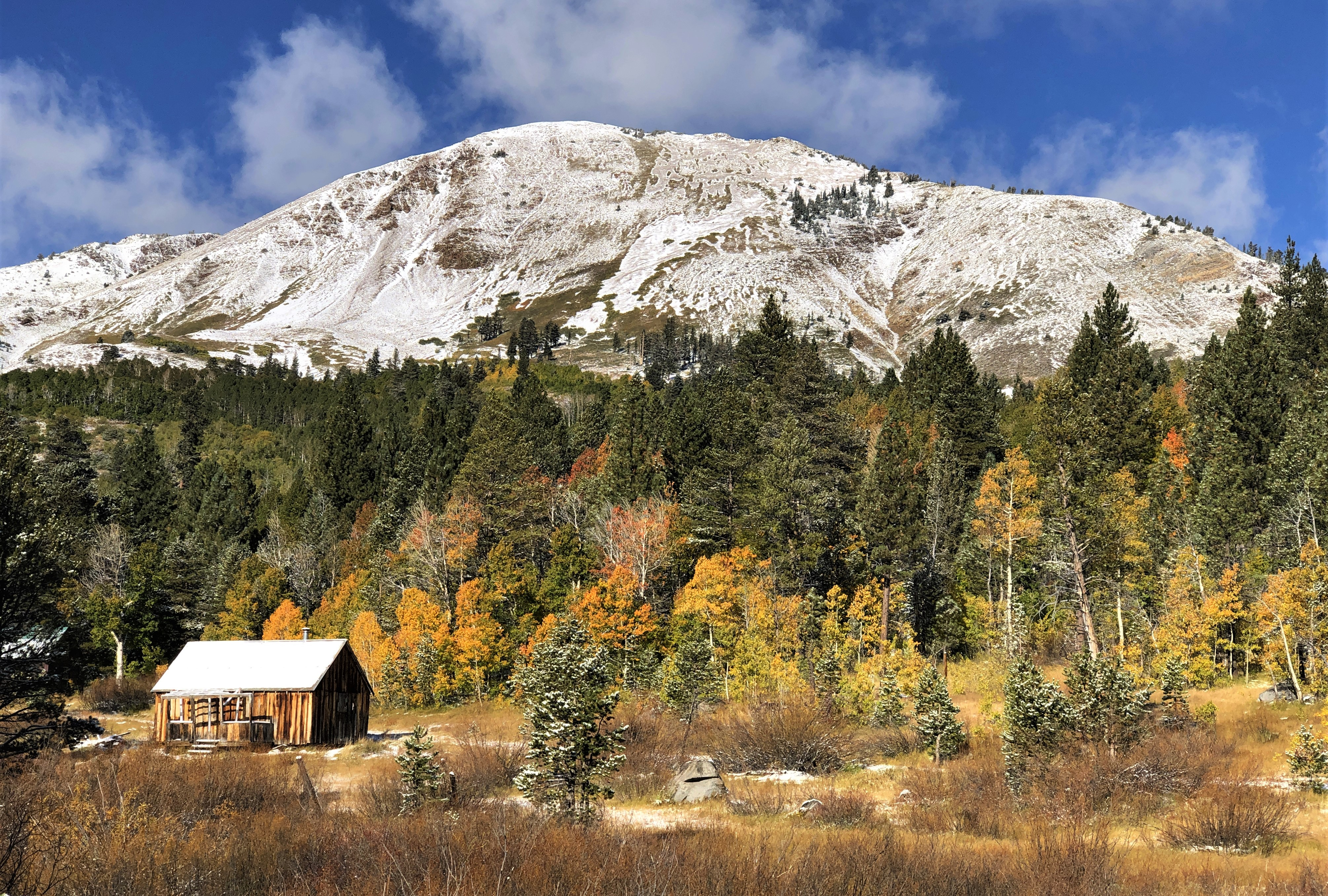
- Deadwood Peak in Eldorado National Forest Grover Hot Springs Bear Valley Mokelumne Peak Hope Valley

- Flag Seal
- Interactive map of Alpine County
- Country: United States
- State: California
- Region: Sierra Nevada
- Incorporated: March 16, 1864
- Named for: Its location in the Sierra Nevada resembling the (Swiss) Alps
- County seat: Markleeville
- Largest community: Alpine Village

Government
  - Type: Council–CAO
  - Body: Board of Supervisors: Charles Dobson; Evan Mecak; Irvin Jim; Terry Woodrow; David Griffith
  - Chair: David Griffith
  - Vice Chair: Evan Mecak
  - County Executive Officer: Sam Booth

Area
  - Total: 743 sq mi (1,920 km^{2})
  - Land: 738 sq mi (1,910 km^{2})
  - Water: 4.8 sq mi (12 km^{2})
- Highest elevation: 11,464 ft (3,494 m)

Population (2020)
  - Total: 1,204
  - Estimate (2025): 1,043 ▼
  - Density: 1.63/sq mi (0.630/km^{2})

GDP
  - Total: $0.117 billion (2022)
- Time zone: UTC−8 (Pacific Standard Time)
  - Summer (DST): UTC−7 (Pacific Daylight Time)
- Area codes: 209, 530
- FIPS code: 06-003
- GNIS feature ID: 1675840
- Congressional district: 3rd
- Website: www.alpinecountyca.gov

Alpine County is a county in the eastern part of the U.S. state of California located within the Sierra Nevada on the state border with Nevada. As of the 2020 census, the population was 1,204, making it California's least populous county. The county seat is Markleeville and the largest community is Alpine Village.

== History ==
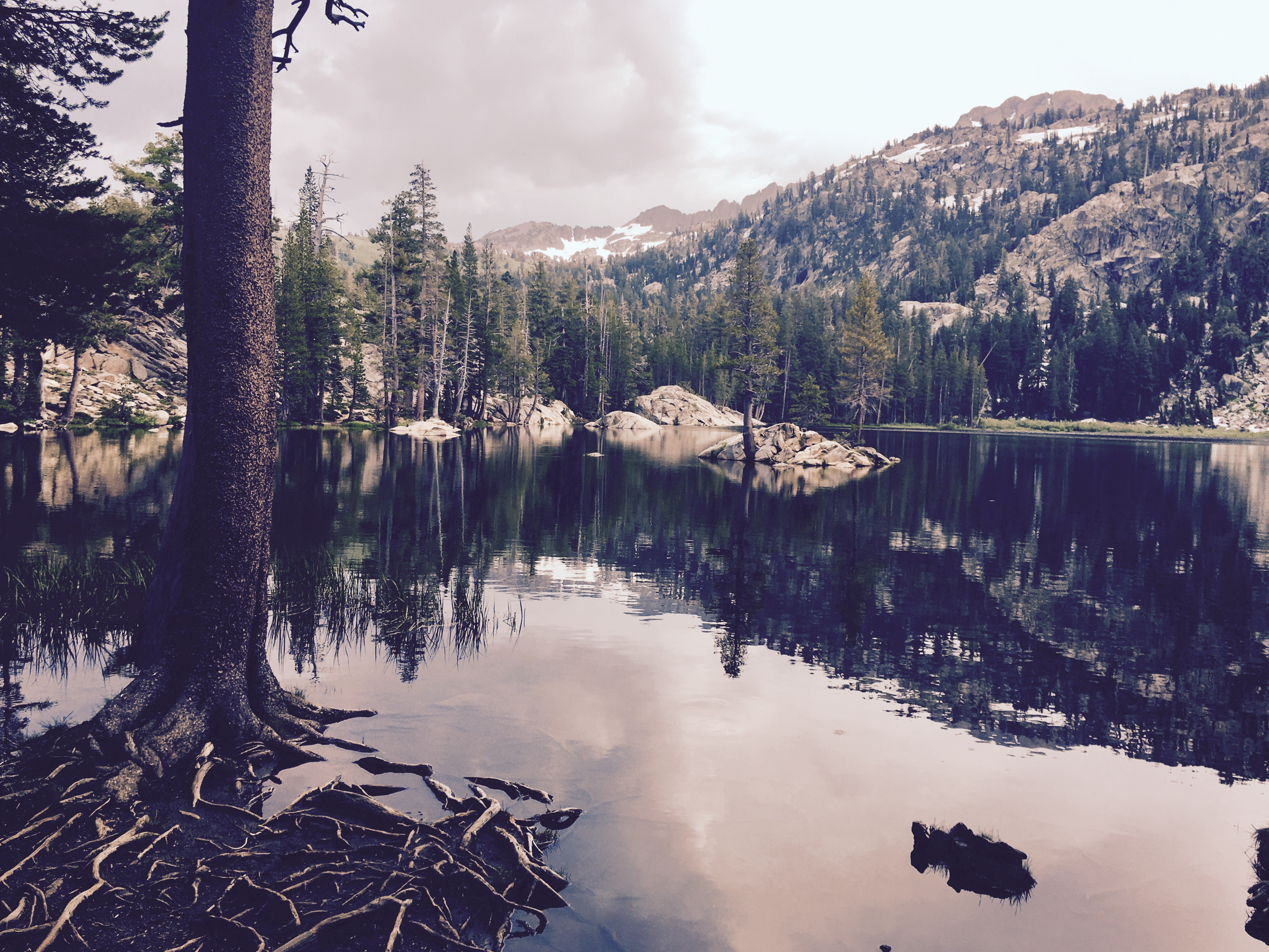
Woods Lake, situated in Alpine County

The Washoe people, a Great Basin tribe, inhabited the Sierra Nevada on the California–Nevada boundary, with the Hung A Lel Ti band populating the Diamond Valley including what would become Alpine County.

Kit Carson and John C. Frémont were among the first explorers to bring nationwide attention to the Sierra Nevada region in their winter 1844 expedition, though the first known westerners to actually explore the area were Jedediah Smith and Joseph R. Walker. Though gold spurred the infrastructural development of Alpine County, the Comstock Lode found near Virginia City, Nevada and the subsequent silver boom was what triggered Alpine County's growth, even attracting gold miners from neighboring Nevada. This prompted the formation on March 16, 1864, from parts of Amador County, Calaveras County, El Dorado County, Mono County and Tuolumne County. It was named Alpine County due to its resemblance to the Swiss Alps. At its formation, it had a population numbering around 11,000. By 1868, however, the local silver mines had proven unfruitful of replicating the Nevada silver boom and the population fell to about 685 in the 1870 Census, a decline that would steadily continue through the 1950s. Silver Mountain (established as Köngsberg) was designated the county seat following the discovery of silver nearby by Norwegian miners. Markleeville, established by Jacob Markley in 1861 as a 160-acre claim encompassing a bridge and toll station, became the new county seat in 1875. The collapse of the silver industry and closing of mines was finalized with the demonetization of silver in 1873, and Silver Mountain was abandoned by 1886, with most businesses moving to Markleeville.

Following the devastating collapse of the silver industry, the population began quickly declining until the 1950s, falling to an all-time low of 241 in 1930. During this time, its small economy limited the county to serving primarily as a trading center for the local farming and lumber industries, as well as fishing and hunting during the 1930s. Several lots in the county were left vacant.

Alpine County finally managed an economic rebound with the construction of the Bear Valley and Kirkwood ski resorts in the late 1960s, the latter of which is split with Amador County. The population shot up from 484 in 1970 to 1,097 in 1980, a 126.65% increase, and has remained around that level. The three national forests (Eldorado, Humboldt–Toiyabe and Stanislaus) means 96% of the county is owned by the federal government, providing opportunities for economic development and tourism to the skiing resorts as well as historical tourism and outdoor recreation.

== Geography ==
According to the United States Census Bureau, the county has an area of 743 square miles (1,920 km^{2}), of which 738 square miles (1,910 km^{2}) is land and 4.8 square miles (12 km^{2}) (0.7%) is water. The federal government owns about 96% of Alpine County, the highest percentage in California, including three national forests: Eldorado (54,318 acres, or 7.81% of the 695,098-acre total), Stanislaus (119,805 acres, or 13.32% of the 899,427 acre-total) and Humboldt–Toiyabe (233,962 acres, or 3.72% of the 6,290,945 acre-total).

=== Adjacent counties ===
- El Dorado County – northwest
- Douglas County, Nevada – northeast
- Mono County – southeast
- Tuolumne County – south
- Calaveras County – southwest
- Amador County – west

=== National protected areas ===
- Eldorado National Forest (part)
- Stanislaus National Forest (part)
- Toiyabe National Forest (part)

== Geology ==
Alpine County's geology is characterized by granitic intrusions, volcanic activity, and glacial sculpting. A significant portion of Alpine County is underlain by granitic rocks of the Sierra Nevada Batholith, a vast composite of plutonic rocks formed during the Mesozoic Era, that extends along the Sierra Nevada mountain range.

During the Miocene epoch, the region experienced extensive volcanic activity, leading to the deposition of andesitic lava flows, ash-flow tuffs, and volcanic breccias. These volcanic deposits are particularly evident along Monitor Pass and Ebbetts Pass. The Pleistocene epoch brought significant glaciation to Alpine County, carving out characteristic alpine landforms such as U-shaped valleys, cirques, and moraines. These glacial features are prominent in areas like the Mokelumne and Carson-Iceberg Wildernesses.

== Demographics ==
Historical population
Census	Pop.	Note	%±
1870	685		—
1880	539		−21.3%
1890	667		23.7%
1900	509		−23.7%
1910	309		−39.3%
1920	243		−21.4%
1930	241		−0.8%
1940	323		34.0%
1950	241		−25.4%
1960	397		64.7%
1970	484		21.9%
1980	1,097		126.7%
1990	1,113		1.5%
2000	1,208		8.5%
2010	1,175		−2.7%
2020	1,204		2.5%
2025 (est.)	1,043	▼	−13.4%
U.S. Decennial Census; 1790–1960 1900–1990; 1990–2000 2010 2020

=== 2020 census ===
As of the 2020 census, the county had a population of 1,204. The median age was 50.1 years. 16.2% of residents were under the age of 18 and 25.0% of residents were 65 years of age or older. For every 100 females there were 110.9 males, and for every 100 females age 18 and over there were 111.1 males age 18 and over.

The racial makeup of the county was 67.6% White, 0.8% Black or African American, 19.6% American Indian and Alaska Native, 1.0% Asian, 0.0% Native Hawaiian and Pacific Islander, 1.1% from some other race, and 9.9% from two or more races. Hispanic or Latino residents of any race comprised 7.0% of the population.

0.0% of residents lived in urban areas, while 100.0% lived in rural areas.

There were 530 households in the county, of which 27.0% had children under the age of 18 living with them and 21.3% had a female householder with no spouse or partner present. About 30.4% of all households were made up of individuals and 14.5% had someone living alone who was 65 years of age or older.

There were 1,540 housing units, of which 65.6% were vacant. Among occupied housing units, 70.4% were owner-occupied and 29.6% were renter-occupied. The homeowner vacancy rate was 2.8% and the rental vacancy rate was 22.7%.

=== Racial and ethnic composition ===
Alpine County, California – Racial and ethnic composition Note: the US Census treats Hispanic/Latino as an ethnic category. This table excludes Latinos from the racial categories and assigns them to a separate category. Hispanics/Latinos may be of any race.
Race / Ethnicity (NH = Non-Hispanic)	Pop 1980	Pop 1990	Pop 2000	Pop 2010	Pop 2020	% 1980	% 1990	% 2000	% 2010	% 2020
White alone (NH)	901	772	867	852	801	82.13%	69.36%	71.77%	72.51%	66.53%
Black or African American alone (NH)	3	5	7	0	10	0.27%	0.45%	0.58%	0.00%	0.83%
Native American or Alaska Native alone (NH)	146	257	188	210	214	13.31%	23.09%	15.56%	17.87%	17.77%
Asian alone (NH)	5	5	4	7	12	0.46%	0.45%	0.33%	0.60%	1.00%
Native Hawaiian or Pacific Islander alone (NH)	x	x	1	0	0	x	x	0.08%	0.00%	0.00%
Other race alone (NH)	0	0	6	1	7	0.00%	0.00%	0.50%	0.09%	0.58%
Mixed race or Multiracial (NH)	x	x	41	21	76	x	x	3.39%	1.79%	6.31%
Hispanic or Latino (any race)	42	74	94	84	84	3.83%	6.65%	7.78%	7.15%	6.98%
Total	1,097	1,113	1,208	1,175	1,204	100.00%	100.00%	100.00%	100.00%	100.00%

=== American Community Survey 2025 data ===
The United States Census Bureau estimated that in 2025, Alpine County’s population was 1,043. It was also estimated that the county's population was 60,50% Non-Hispanic White, 14,67% Hispanic or Latino, 0,48% Non-Hispanic Black, 1,15% Asian, 17,74% Native American, 0,58% Pacific Islander, and 4,89% Multiracial.

Total	Population	Percentage
Non-Hispanic White	631	60,50%
Hispanic or Latino	153	14,67%
Non-Hispanic Black	5	0,48%
Asian	12	1,15%
Native American	185	17,74%
Pacific Islander	6	0,58%
Non-Hispanic Multiracial	51	4,89%

=== 2019 American Community Survey estimates ===
2019 American Community Survey 5-Year Estimates: Alpine County, California

Population
Group	Estimate	Percent
Total population	1,039	
Sex
Group	Estimate	Percent
Male	554	53.32%
Female	485	46.68%
Sex ratio (males per 100 females)	92.8	114.2
Age
Group	Estimate	Percent
Under 5 years	44	4.23%
5 to 9 years	50	4.81%
10 to 14 years	73	7.03%
15 to 19 years	59	5.68%
20 to 24 years	43	4.14%
25 to 29 years	21	2.02%
30 to 34 years	45	4.33%
35 to 39 years	86	8.28%
40 to 44 years	62	5.97%
45 to 49 years	13	1.25%
50 to 54 years	43	4.14%
55 to 59 years	73	7.03%
60 to 64 years	116	11.16%
65 to 69 years	97	9.34%
70 to 74 years	133	12.80%
75 to 79 years	54	5.20%
80 to 84 years	4	0.38%
85 years and over	23	2.21%
Median age (years)	52.2	
Age dependency ratio	97.2	
Old-age dependency ratio	59.0	
Child dependency ratio	38.1	
Race
Group	Estimate	Percent
White	599	57.65%
Black or African American	9	0.87%
American Indian or Alaska Native	353	33.97%
--- Cherokee tribal grouping	0	0.00%
--- Chippewa tribal grouping	0	0.00%
--- Navajo tribal grouping	0	0.00%
--- Sioux tribal grouping	0	0.00%
Asian	10	0.96%
--- Asian Indian	0	0.00%
--- Chinese	0	0.00%
--- Filipino	0	0.00%
--- Japanese	0	0.00%
--- Korean	0	0.00%
--- Vietnamese	5	0.48%
--- Other Asian	5	0.48%
Native Hawaiian and other Pacific Islander	6	0.58%
--- Native Hawaiian	6	0.58%
--- Guamanian or Chamorro	0	0.00%
--- Samoan	0	0.00%
--- Other Pacific Islander	0	0.00%
Some other race	9	0.87%
Two or more races	53	5.10%
--- White and Black or African American	0	0.00%
--- White and American Indian and Alaska Native	47	4.52%
--- White and Asian	0	0.00%
--- Black or African American and American Indian and Alaska Native	0	0.00%
Hispanic or Latino and race
Group	Estimate	Percent
Hispanic or Latino	130	12.51%
--- Mexican	116	11.16%
--- Puerto Rican	0	0.00%
--- Cuban	0	0.00%
--- Other Hispanic or Latino	14	1.35%
Not Hispanic or Latino	909	87.49%
--- White	551	53.03%
--- Black or African American	9	0.87%
--- American Indian and Alaska Native	314	30.22%
--- Asian	10	0.96%
--- Native Hawaiian and other Pacific Islander	0	0.00%
--- Some other race	0	0.00%
--- Two or more races	25	2.41%
Voting Age Population
Group	Estimate	Percent
Voting Age Population	815	78.44%
--- Male	428	41.19%
--- Female	387	37.25%
Nativity and citizenship status
Group	Estimate	Percent
Native (born in the United States)	986	94.90%
--- Born in California	524	50.43%
--- Born in other U.S. state	446	42.93%
------ Northeastern state	65	6.26%
------ Midwestern state	65	6.26%
------ Southern state	41	3.95%
------ Western state	275	26.47%
--- Native born outside U.S. states	16	1.54%
------ Puerto Rico	0	0.00%
------ U.S. Island Areas	0	0.00%
------ Born abroad of American parents	16	1.54%
Foreign Born	53	5.10%
--- Naturalized U.S. citizen	30	2.89%
------ Europe	16	1.54%
------ Asia	14	1.35%
------ Africa	0	0.00%
------ Oceania	0	0.00%
------ Latin America	0	0.00%
------ Northern America	0	0.00%
--- Not a U.S. citizen	23	2.21%
------ Europe	0	0.00%
------ Asia	5	0.48%
------ Africa	0	0.00%
------ Oceania	0	0.00%
------ Latin America	18	1.73%
------ Northern America	0	0.00%

=== 2010 census ===
The 2010 United States census reported that Alpine County had a population of 1,175. The racial makeup of Alpine County was 881 (75.0%) White, 0 (0.0%) African American, 240 (20.4%) Native American, 7 (0.6%) Asian, 0 (0.0%) Pacific Islander, 19 (1.6%) from other races, and 28 (2.4%) from two or more races. Hispanic or Latino of any race were 84 persons (7.1%).

Population reported at 2010 United States census
The County	Total; Population	White	African; American	Native; American	Asian	Pacific; Islander	other races	two or more races	Hispanic or Latino (of any race)
Alpine County	1175	881	0	240	7	0	19	28	84
Census-designated places	Total; Population	White	African; American	Native; American	Asian	Pacific; Islander	other races	two or more races	Hispanic or Latino (of any race)
Alpine Village	114	91	0	19	1	0	2	1	6
Bear Valley	121	119	0	0	1	0	0	1	1
Kirkwood‡	97	94	0	3	0	0	0	0	0
Markleeville	210	192	0	4	2	0	6	6	11
Mesa Vista	200	178	0	15	2	0	0	5	11
Other unincorporated areas	Total; Population	White	African; American	Native; American	Asian	Pacific; Islander	other races	two or more races	Hispanic or Latino (of any race)
All others not CDPs (combined)	433	217	0	199	1	0	11	15	51
‡ – census results for the portion of this CDP in Alpine County

=== 2000 census ===
As of the census of 2000, there were 1,208 people, 483 households, and 295 families residing in the county. The population density was 2 people per square mile (0.77 people/km^{2}). There were 1,514 housing units at an average density of 2 units per square mile (0.77 units/km^{2}). The racial makeup of the county was 73.7% White, 0.6% Black or African American, 18.9% Native American, 0.3% Asian, 0.1% Pacific Islander, 1.4% from other races, and 5.1% from two or more races. 7.8% of the population were Hispanic or Latino of any race. 12.1% were of German, 12.1% Irish, 9.3% English, 6.5% American and 5.7% Italian ancestry. 95.0% spoke English, 3.1% Spanish and 2.0% Washo as their first language.

There were 483 households, out of which 25.5% had children under the age of 18 living with them, 43.9% were married couples living together, 11.0% had a female householder with no husband present, and 38.9% were non-families. 27.7% of all households were made up of individuals, and 5.4% had someone living alone who was 65 years of age or older. The average household size was 2.50 and the average family size was 2.96.

In the county, the population was spread out, with 22.8% under the age of 18, 10.4% from 18 to 24, 27.5% from 25 to 44, 29.3% from 45 to 64, and 9.9% who were 65 years of age or older. The median age was 39 years. For every 100 females there were 110.8 males. For every 100 females age 18 and over, there were 117.2 males.

The median income for a household in the county was $41,875, and the median income for a family was $50,250. Males had a median income of $36,544 versus $25,800 for females. The per capita income for the county was $24,431. About 12.0% of families and 19.5% of the population were below the poverty line, including 27.4% of those under age 18 and 10.1% of those age 65 or over.

== Politics ==
Throughout the 20th century, Alpine County was a Republican stronghold in presidential and congressional elections. From 1892 until 2004, the only Democrat to carry Alpine County in a presidential election was Franklin Roosevelt in 1932 and 1936. In 1964, Alpine was one of only five counties in the state to back Barry Goldwater. It was among the five most Republican counties in the entire nation in 1892, 1908, 1920, and 1928. Warren Harding and Herbert Hoover gained over ninety percent of the county's vote. However, Alpine has become more of a Democratic county in recent elections. It was carried by John Kerry in 2004 and has stayed in the Democratic column since. No Republican has won a majority in the county since 1988. In 2024, Alpine County was the only county in California to swing to the left, giving Kamala Harris a larger margin of victory than Joe Biden in 2020.

United States presidential election results for Alpine County, California
Year	Republican		Democratic		Third party(ies)	
Year	No.	%	No.	%	No.	%
1892	65	75.58%	17	19.77%	4	4.65%
1896	40	49.38%	39	48.15%	2	2.47%
1900	69	82.14%	15	17.86%	0	0.00%
1904	74	89.16%	9	10.84%	0	0.00%
1908	75	87.21%	11	12.79%	0	0.00%
1912	8	10.00%	34	42.50%	38	47.50%
1916	60	72.29%	23	27.71%	0	0.00%
1920	64	91.43%	6	8.57%	0	0.00%
1924	52	88.14%	5	8.47%	2	3.39%
1928	49	94.23%	3	5.77%	0	0.00%
1932	53	47.32%	56	50.00%	3	2.68%
1936	74	46.54%	85	53.46%	0	0.00%
1940	125	66.49%	62	32.98%	1	0.53%
1944	98	68.53%	45	31.47%	0	0.00%
1948	106	76.81%	25	18.12%	7	5.07%
1952	148	88.10%	20	11.90%	0	0.00%
1956	114	79.72%	29	20.28%	0	0.00%
1960	132	76.74%	40	23.26%	0	0.00%
1964	124	57.67%	91	42.33%	0	0.00%
1968	150	59.29%	83	32.81%	20	7.91%
1972	366	63.54%	195	33.85%	15	2.60%
1976	225	50.34%	189	42.28%	33	7.38%
1980	254	55.10%	133	28.85%	74	16.05%
1984	264	56.65%	194	41.63%	8	1.72%
1988	306	55.43%	230	41.67%	16	2.90%
1992	222	35.18%	215	34.07%	194	30.74%
1996	264	43.00%	258	42.02%	92	14.98%
2000	281	47.95%	265	45.22%	40	6.83%
2004	311	44.37%	373	53.21%	17	2.43%
2008	252	36.42%	422	60.98%	18	2.60%
2012	236	36.14%	389	59.57%	28	4.29%
2016	217	36.05%	334	55.48%	51	8.47%
2020	244	32.93%	476	64.24%	21	2.83%
2024	243	32.93%	479	64.91%	16	2.17%

In November 2008, Alpine was one of just three counties in California's interior in which voters rejected Proposition 8, the ballot initiative to amend the California Constitution to reject the legal extension of the title of marriage to same-sex couples. Alpine voters rejected Proposition 8 by 56.4 percent to 43.6 percent. The only other inland counties in which Proposition 8 failed to receive a majority of votes were Yolo County and Alpine's neighbor Mono County.

Alpine County is in California's 3rd congressional district, represented by Independent Kevin Kiley. In the State Assembly, the county is in the 1st Assembly district, represented by Republican Heather Hadwick. In the State Senate, the county is in the 4th senatorial district, represented by Republican Marie Alvarado-Gil.

Due to its low population density, Alpine County votes entirely by mail, one of two counties in California which do so. In the June 2014 primary elections, about 22% of registered voters statewide went to the polls; in Alpine County, the number was almost 70%, the highest of any county in the state.

=== Stonewall Nation ===
Gay activist Don Jackson seriously presented an idea for taking over Alpine County at a December 28, 1969, gay liberation conference in Berkeley, California. The project, which eventually became known as Stonewall Nation, was subsequently surreptitiously used by fellow gay activists Morris Kight and Don Kilhefner as an agitation and propaganda tool with no serious plans to bring the idea to fruition. Once the political theater aspect of the project was exposed, planning for the Alpine County project came to a halt even among demoralized true believers.

=== Posse Comitatus controversy ===
In the late 1970s, the Posse Comitatus organization attempted to take over Alpine County by settling there and fielding candidates in local elections. The Posse thought winning local elections in Alpine County was their best opportunity to take control of a single county. The group fielded a candidate for sheriff and registered fictitious voters using post office boxes and vacant lots as their addresses. Six people were prosecuted for voter fraud, the false registrations were thrown out, and the incumbent sheriff was re-elected.

=== Voter registration statistics ===
Population and registered voters
Total eligible population	1,015	
Registered voters (Note: Percentage of registered voters with respect to total population. Percentages of party members with respect to registered voters follow.)	915	90.1%
Democratic	388	42.4%
Republican	216	23.6%
Democratic–Republican spread	+172	+18.8%
American Independent	50	5.5%
Libertarian	18	1.9%
Green	8	0.8%
Peace and Freedom	3	0.0%
Other	2	0.0%
Other	3	0.0%
No party preference	277	30.3%

== Transportation ==
=== Major highways ===
- State Route 4
- State Route 88
- State Route 89
- State Route 108
- State Route 207

=== Airport ===
Alpine County Airport is a general aviation airport in the Eastern Sierra about 4 miles (6.4 km) from the town of Markleeville. The airport consists of a simple airstrip with an apron for small light aircraft to park. The airport has no buildings, no lights, and is rarely used. The airport is popular with astronomers due to the clear, dark skies.

== Communities ==
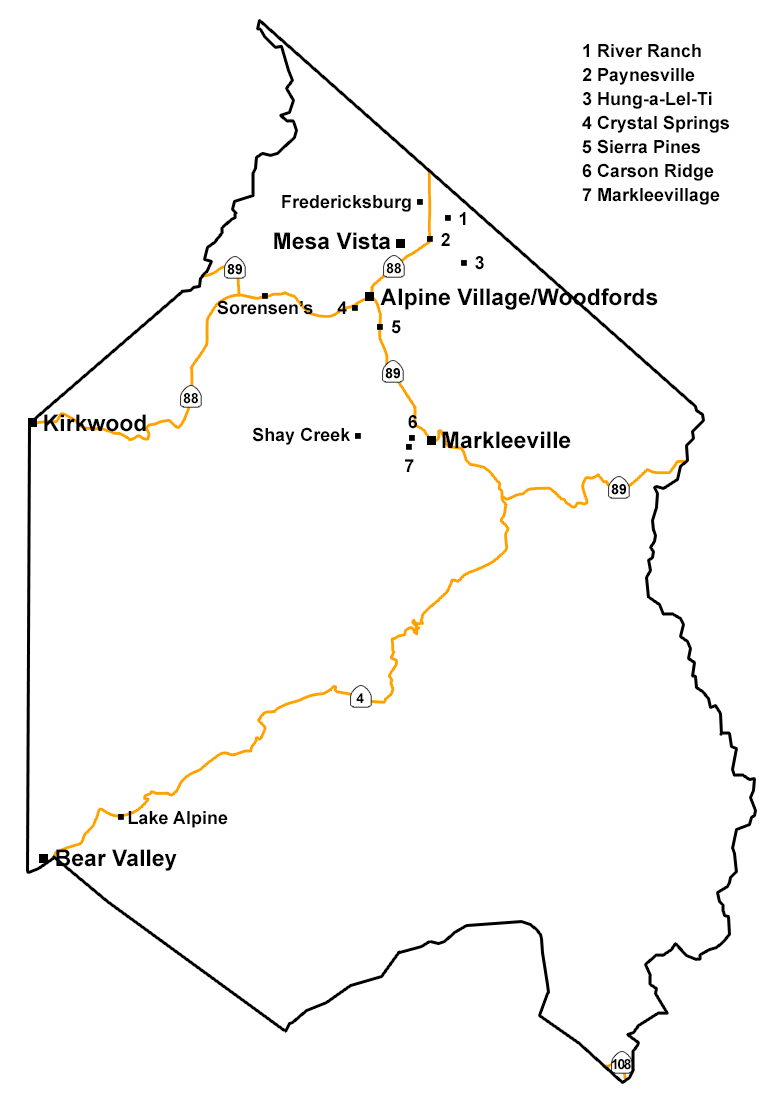
Locator map of communities in Alpine County

All communities in Alpine County are unincorporated:

- Alpine Village (Note: For statistical purposes, defined by the United States Census Bureau as a census-designated place (CDP).)
- Bear Valley
- Fredericksburg
- Kirkwood
- Lake Alpine
- Loope
- Markleeville (county seat)
- Mesa Vista
- Paynesville
- Sorensens
- Woodfords

The only other counties in California with no incorporated cities are Mariposa and Trinity.

=== Population ranking ===
The population ranking of the following table is based on the 2020 census of Alpine County.

† county seat

Rank	City/Town/etc.	Municipal type	Population (2020 census)
1	Woodfords Community	AIAN	225
2	Alpine Village	CDP	224
3	Mesa Vista	CDP	217
4	† Markleeville	CDP	191
5	Kirkwood (partially in Amador County)	CDP	190
6	Bear Valley	CDP	128

== See also ==
- Alpine County Unified School District
- National Register of Historic Places listings in Alpine County, California
- Stonewall Nation, a proposal by gay activists to colonize Alpine County in the 1970s
- List of counties in California
