= Grover Hot Springs State Park =

State park in Alpine County, California, United States

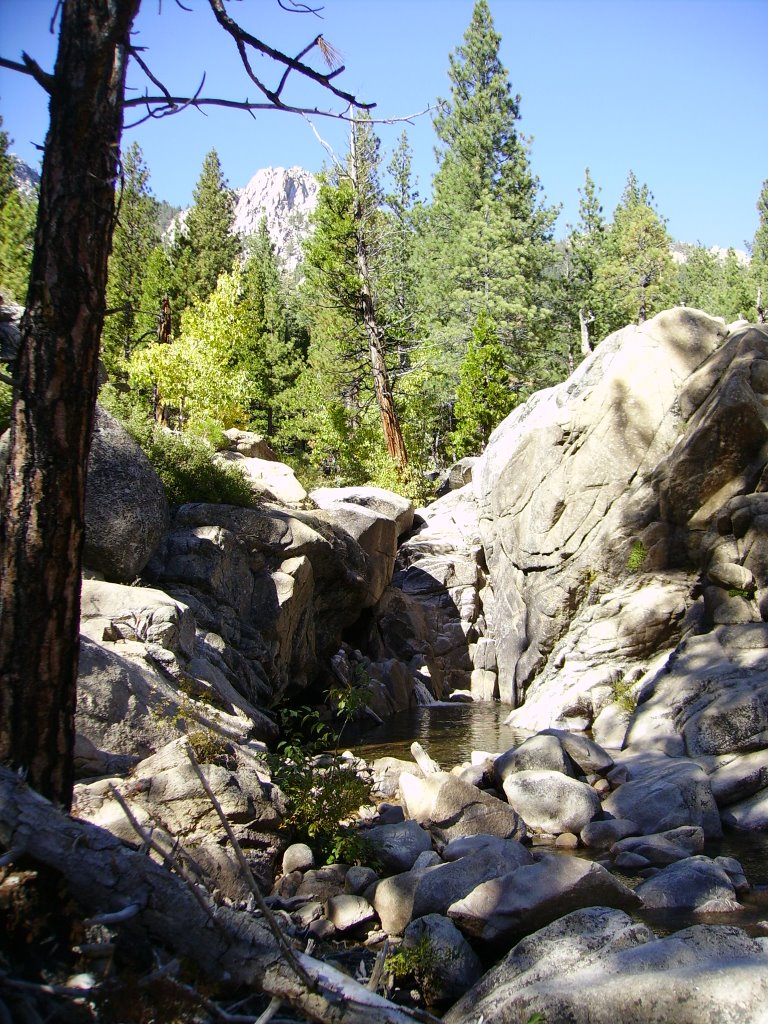
- Streambed and waterfall at Grover Hot Springs

- Location within California Location within the United States
- Interactive map of Grover Hot Springs State Park
- Location: Alpine County, California, United States
- Nearest city: Markleeville, California
- Coordinates: 38°42′5″N 119°50′20″W
- Area: 553 acres (224 ha)
- Established: 1959
- Governing body: California Department of Parks and Recreation

Grover Hot Springs State Park is a state park of California, United States, containing natural hot springs on the eastern side of the Sierra Nevada. Park amenities include a swimming pool fed by the hot springs, a campground, picnic area, and hiking trails. The park was established in 1959. It was named after Alvin Merrill Grover, who owned a share of the land in 1878 and built a bathhouse and a fence around the springs.

== Natural History ==
=== Geography ===
Grover Hot Springs State Park is a 553 acre park located at 5,900 feet (1,800 m) in the northern Sierra Nevada, at the edge of the Great Basin. The park is located four miles west of Markleeville, via Hot Springs Road off of SR 89. The valley was formed by glacial action during the ice age. The hot springs are the result of the subduction of the Pacific plate under the heavier American continental plate.

=== Ecology ===
The park's main ecosystems are pine forest, sagebrush, and open meadows. Incense cedar, mountain alder, and juniper grow nearby. Bald eagles, sharp-shinned hawks, turkey vultures, mountain lions, black bears, coyotes, raccoons, bobcats, owls, and bats have all been observed in the park.

=== Hot springs ===
The thermal waters of the hot springs hold both health and spiritual value for the area's native Washoe people. The Washo name for the springs is dih-teh-ee (our place) lo-om (hot springs).

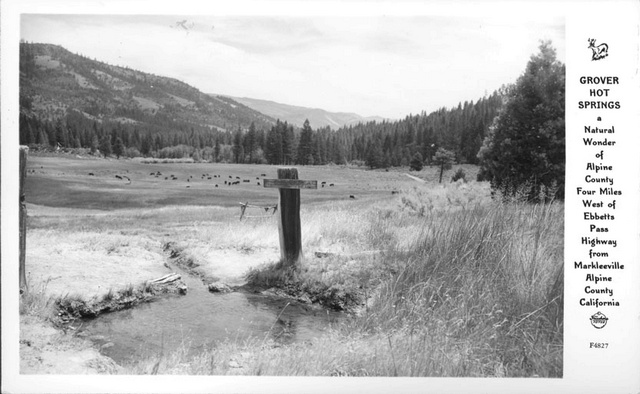
Grover Hot Springs c. 1947

In the present day, visitors can swim in a pool filled with sanitized water from the hot springs at the end of the Hot Springs Trail. The six mineral springs are naturally 148˚ F, but the pool is kept between 102-104˚ F by using a holding tank where the hot water is allowed to cool. The pool appears yellow-green because of a reaction between bromine, which is used as a sanitizing agent, and mineral salts naturally occurring in the hot spring water.

== Technical data ==
Hot Springs energy output
Temperature	147 °F	41 °C
Flow	105 gpm	398 L/min
Capacity	0.6×10^{6} BTU/h	0.2 MWt
Annual energy	4.7×10^{9} BTU	1.4 GWh

Element analysis (mg/L)
Sodium	440	Iron	< 0.02
Potassium	13	Manganese	0.08
Lithium	0.82	Ammonia	< 0.10
Rubidium	0.06	Bicarbonate	775
Cesium	0.1	Carbonate	< 1.0
Calcium	31	Sulfate	160
Magnesium	1.9	Chloride	190
Aluminum	0.002	Fluoride	4.2
Silica	100	Boron	3.1
Sulfide	< 0.05		

Element analysis (μg/L)
Cobalt	< 50	Copper	< 10
Cadmium	< 10	Mercury	< 0.1
Nickel	< 20	Lead	< 100
Zinc	110		

Gas escaping (vol%)
Oxygen+argon	1.4
Nitrogen	62.0
Methane	0.34
Carbon dioxide	36.4

== See also ==
- List of California state parks
