= Loope, California =

Unincorporated community in California, United States

Loope
- Unincorporated community
- Location in California Loope (the United States)
- Coordinates: 38°39′55″N 119°41′46″W
- Country: United States
- State: California
- County: Alpine
- Elevation: 6,188 ft (1,886 m)

Loope (formerly Loopeville and Monitor) is an unincorporated community in Alpine County, California, United States. It is located on Monitor Creek at an elevation of 6188 feet (1886 m).

A post office operated at Monitor from 1863 to 1888. The Loope post office operated from 1898 to 1908.

The place was originally named from the nearby Monitor Mine, which in turn was named for the Civil War naval vessel. It was renamed in honor of a Dr. Loope, who resurrected the mining industry locally with the influx of investments from the East Coast.
