= Paynesville, California =

Unincorporated community in California, United States

Paynesville
- Unincorporated community
- Location in California Paynesville (the United States)
- Coordinates: 38°48′33″N 119°46′46″W
- Country: United States
- State: California
- County: Alpine
- Elevation: 5,120 ft (1,560 m)

Paynesville is an unincorporated community in Alpine County, California, United States. It is located on the Carson River, one-quarter mile (0.4 km) northeast of Woodfords, at an elevation of 5118 feet (1560 m).
