= Mesa Vista, California =

Mesa Vista
- Unincorporated Community; Census Designated Place
- Location in Alpine County and the state of California

- Location in the United States
- Coordinates: 38°48′26″N 119°47′46″W
- Country: United States
- State: California
- County: Alpine

Government
  - State Senate: Marie Alvarado-Gil (R)
  - State Assembly: Heather Hadwick (R)
  - U. S. Congress: Kevin Kiley (I)

Area
  - Total: 4.876 sq mi (12.628 km^{2})
  - Land: 4.876 sq mi (12.628 km^{2})
  - Water: 0 sq mi (0 km^{2}) 0%
- Elevation: 5,486 ft (1,672 m)

Population (2020)
  - Total: 217
  - Density: 44.5/sq mi (17.2/km^{2})
- Time zone: UTC-8 (Pacific (PST))
  - Summer (DST): UTC-7 (PDT)
- ZIP code: 96120
- Area codes: 530, 837
- FIPS code: 06-47086
- GNIS feature ID: 1877181, 2408820

Mesa Vista (corruption of Vista de la Mesa, Spanish for "View of Table") is a census-designated place (CDP) in Alpine County, California, United States. The population was 217 at the 2020 census, up from 200 at the 2010 census.

== Geography ==
According to the United States Census Bureau, the CDP has a total area of 4.9 square miles (13 km^{2}), all land.

== Demographics ==
Historical population
Census	Pop.	Note	%±
2000	182		—
2010	200		9.9%
2020	217		8.5%
U.S. Decennial Census; 1860–1870 1880-1890; 1900 1910 1920; 1930 1940 1950; 1960 1970 1980; 1990 2000 2010; 2020

Mesa Vista first appeared as a census designated place in the 2000 U.S. census.

=== 2020 census ===
Mesa Vista CDP, California – Racial and ethnic composition Note: the US Census treats Hispanic/Latino as an ethnic category. This table excludes Latinos from the racial categories and assigns them to a separate category. Hispanics/Latinos may be of any race.
Race / Ethnicity (NH = Non-Hispanic)	Pop 2000	Pop 2010	Pop 2020	% 2000	% 2010	% 2020
White alone (NH)	157	172	171	86.26%	86.00%	78.80%
Black or African American alone (NH)	6	0	1	3.30%	0.00%	0.46%
Native American or Alaska Native alone (NH)	8	11	1	4.40%	5.50%	0.46%
Asian alone (NH)	0	2	0	0.00%	1.00%	0.00%
Native Hawaiian or Pacific Islander alone (NH)	0	0	0	0.00%	0.00%	0.00%
Other race alone (NH)	1	0	0	0.55%	0.00%	0.00%
Mixed race or Multiracial (NH)	2	4	26	1.10%	2.00%	11.98%
Hispanic or Latino (any race)	8	11	18	4.40%	5.50%	8.29%
Total	182	200	217	100.00%	100.00%	100.00%

The 2020 United States census reported that Mesa Vista had a population of 217. The population density was 44.5 inhabitants per square mile (17.2/km^{2}). The racial makeup of Mesa Vista was 80.6% White, 0.5% African American, 1.4% Native American, 0.0% Asian, 0.0% Pacific Islander, 0.0% from other races, and 17.5% from two or more races. Hispanic or Latino of any race were 8.3% of the population.

There were 89 households, out of which 25.8% included children under the age of 18, 55.1% were married-couple households, 11.2% were cohabiting couple households, 20.2% had a female householder with no partner present, and 13.5% had a male householder with no partner present. 21.3% of households were one person, and 12.4% were one person aged 65 or older. The average household size was 2.44. There were 63 families (70.8% of all households).

The age distribution was 11.5% under the age of 18, 0.5% aged 18 to 24, 21.2% aged 25 to 44, 37.3% aged 45 to 64, and 29.5% who were 65 years of age or older. The median age was 55.5 years. For every 100 females, there were 100.9 males.

There were 106 housing units at an average density of 21.7 units per square mile (8.4 units/km^{2}), of which 89 (84.0%) were occupied. Of these, 91.0% were owner-occupied, and 9.0% were occupied by renters.
