= Alpine Village, California =

Alpine Village
- Unincorporated Community; Census Designated Place
- Location in Alpine County and the state of California

- Location in the United States
- Coordinates: 38°46′23″N 119°49′05″W
- Country: United States
- State: California
- County: Alpine

Government
  - State Senate: Marie Alvarado-Gil (R)
  - State Assembly: Heather Hadwick (R)
  - U. S. Congress: Kevin Kiley (I)

Area
  - Total: 4.08 sq mi (10.57 km^{2})
  - Land: 4.08 sq mi (10.57 km^{2})
  - Water: 0 sq mi (0.00 km^{2}) 0%
- Elevation: 5,604 ft (1,708 m)

Population (2020)
  - Total: 224
  - Density: 54.9/sq mi (21.19/km^{2})
- Time zone: UTC-8 (Pacific (PST))
  - Summer (DST): UTC-7 (PDT)
- ZIP code: 96120
- Area codes: 530, 837
- FIPS code: 06-01228
- GNIS feature IDs: 1877182, 2407729

Alpine Village (formerly, Alphine Village) is a census-designated place (CDP) in Alpine County, California, United States. The population was 224 at the 2020 census.

== Geography ==
According to the United States Census Bureau, the CDP has a total area of 4.1 square miles (11 km^{2}), all land.

== Climate ==
Climate data for Alpine Village, 38.7731°N 119.8181°W, 5,554 feet (1,693 m)
Month	Jan	Feb	Mar	Apr	May	Jun	Jul	Aug	Sep	Oct	Nov	Dec	Year
Mean daily maximum °F (°C)	46.3 (7.9)	47.8 (8.8)	52.8 (11.6)	58.2 (14.6)	66.9 (19.4)	76.4 (24.7)	85.3 (29.6)	84.8 (29.3)	78.3 (25.7)	66.5 (19.2)	53.7 (12.1)	45.3 (7.4)	63.5 (17.5)
Daily mean °F (°C)	34.5 (1.4)	35.9 (2.2)	40.1 (4.5)	44.3 (6.8)	51.8 (11.0)	59.7 (15.4)	67.4 (19.7)	66.9 (19.4)	60.6 (15.9)	50.5 (10.3)	40.5 (4.7)	33.9 (1.1)	48.8 (9.4)
Mean daily minimum °F (°C)	22.8 (−5.1)	24.0 (−4.4)	27.4 (−2.6)	30.4 (−0.9)	36.7 (2.6)	42.9 (6.1)	49.5 (9.7)	49.0 (9.4)	42.9 (6.1)	34.5 (1.4)	27.4 (−2.6)	22.5 (−5.3)	34.2 (1.2)
Average precipitation inches (mm)	4.67 (119)	4.40 (112)	3.68 (93)	1.93 (49)	1.33 (34)	0.61 (15)	0.43 (11)	0.43 (11)	0.49 (12)	1.74 (44)	2.67 (68)	4.48 (114)	26.86 (682)
Source: PRISM Climate Group (spatially interpolated, 1991-2020)

== Demographics ==
Historical population
Census	Pop.	Note	%±
2000	136		—
2010	114		−16.2%
2020	224		96.5%
U.S. Decennial Census; 1860–1870 1880-1890; 1900 1910 1920; 1930 1940 1950; 1960 1970 1980; 1990 2000 2010; 2020

Alpine Village first appeared as a census designated place in the 2000 U.S. census.

=== Racial and ethnic composition ===
Alpine Village CDP, California – Racial and ethnic composition Note: the US Census treats Hispanic/Latino as an ethnic category. This table excludes Latinos from the racial categories and assigns them to a separate category. Hispanics/Latinos may be of any race.
Race / Ethnicity (NH = Non-Hispanic)	Pop 2000	Pop 2010	Pop 2020	% 2000	% 2010	% 2020
White alone (NH)	82	87	168	60.29%	76.32%	75.00%
Black or African American alone (NH)	0	0	0	0.00%	0.00%	0.00%
Native American or Alaska Native alone (NH)	31	18	23	22.79%	15.79%	10.27%
Asian alone (NH)	0	1	3	0.00%	0.88%	1.34%
Native Hawaiian or Pacific Islander alone (NH)	0	0	0	0.00%	0.00%	0.00%
Other race alone (NH)	1	1	1	0.74%	0.88%	0.45%
Mixed race or Multiracial (NH)	1	1	9	0.74%	0.88%	4.02%
Hispanic or Latino (any race)	21	6	20	15.44%	5.26%	8.93%
Total	136	114	224	100.00%	100.00%	100.00%

=== 2020 census ===
As of the 2020 census, Alpine Village had a population of 224. The population density was 54.9 inhabitants per square mile (21.2/km^{2}). The age distribution was 12.5% under the age of 18, 3.6% aged 18 to 24, 24.6% aged 25 to 44, 29.0% aged 45 to 64, and 30.4% who were 65 years of age or older. The median age was 55.0 years. For every 100 females there were 89.8 males, and for every 100 females age 18 and over there were 90.3 males age 18 and over.

0.0% of residents lived in urban areas, while 100.0% lived in rural areas.

There were 115 households in Alpine Village, of which 25.2% had children under the age of 18 living in them. Of all households, 40.0% were married-couple households, 13.0% were cohabiting couple households, 21.7% were households with a male householder and no spouse or partner present, and 25.2% were households with a female householder and no spouse or partner present. About 29.6% of all households were made up of individuals and 12.2% had someone living alone who was 65 years of age or older. The average household size was 1.95. There were 69 families (60.0% of all households).

There were 141 housing units at an average density of 34.6 units per square mile (13.4 units/km^{2}), of which 115 (81.6%) were occupied. Of these, 53.9% were owner-occupied and 46.1% were occupied by renters. The homeowner vacancy rate was 4.6% and the rental vacancy rate was 0.0%.
