= Woodfords, California =

Unincorporated community in California, United States

- unincorporated community
- Interactive map of Woodfords, California
- Coordinates: 38°46′40″N 119°49′19″W
- Country: United States
- State: California
- County: Alpine

Government
  - State Senate: Megan Dahle (R)
  - State Assembly: Joe Patterson (R)
  - U. S. Congress: Mike Thompson (D)
- Elevation: 5,617 ft (1,712 m)

Population (2000)
  - Total: 150
- Time zone: UTC-8 (PST)
  - Summer (DST): UTC-7 (PDT)
- ZIP code: 96120
- Area codes: 530, 837

Woodfords (formerly Brannan Springs, Carey's Mill, Cary's Mills, Carys Mill, Carys Mills, Woodford's, Carey's Mills, and Woodford) is an unincorporated community in Alpine County, California, United States, near Markleeville. For census purposes, it is included in Alpine Village. It is located 6 miles (9.7 km) north-northwest of Markleeville, at 38°46′40″N 119°49′19″W.

== History ==
Woodfords holds title as the oldest non-native settlement in the entire region. Sam Brannan left supplies near a spring here in 1847 on his way to Salt Lake City, and Brannan Springs, as it was then called, was ideally positioned to take advantage of traffic on the booming road to California.

After a brief period during which the settlement was known as Carey's Mills, the Woodfords name came into common usage following the establishment of an official post office near a hotel by Daniel Woodford in 1849. A post office opened in Carey's Mills in 1858, the name was changed to Woodfords in 1869, and was closed in 1914; the post office was re-established in 1962, only to close for good in 1974.

Woodfords became a remount station of the Pony Express on April 4, 1860, when Warren Upson scaled the mountains in a blinding snowstorm, reached Woodfords from Lake Tahoe via Luther Pass, and made his way down the eastern slope of the Sierra on his way to Carson City. Five weeks later the Pony Express was rerouted by way of Echo Summit and the Kingsbury Grade. The remount station is now California Historical Landmark #805.

Woodfords is home to about 150 full-time residents, while the Southern band of the Washo tribe has a small community in nearby Diamond Valley.
