= Markleeville, California =

Markleeville
- Unincorporated Community; Census Designated Place
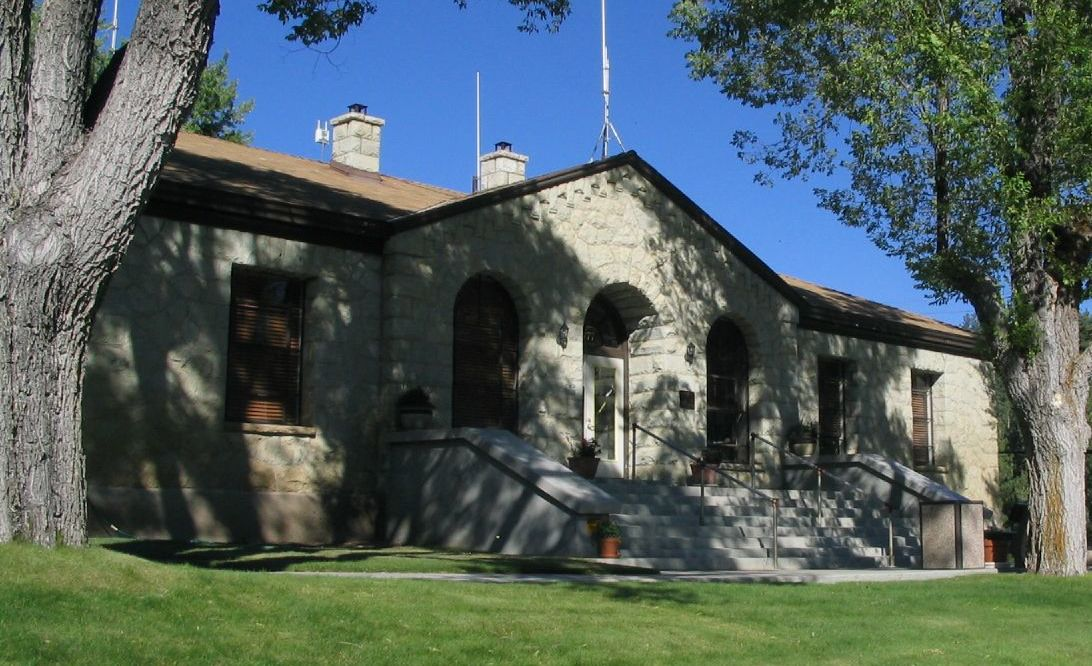
- Alpine County Courthouse
- Interactive map of Markleeville
- Location in California Location in the United States
- Coordinates: 38°41′42″N 119°46′49″W
- Country: United States
- State: California
- County: Alpine

Government
  - State Senate: Marie Alvarado-Gil (R)
  - State Assembly: Heather Hadwick (R)
  - U.S. Congress: Kevin Kiley (I)

Area
  - Total: 6.531 sq mi (16.915 km^{2})
  - Land: 6.531 sq mi (16.915 km^{2})
  - Water: 0 sq mi (0 km^{2}) 0%
- Elevation: 5,531 ft (1,686 m)

Population (2020)
  - Total: 191
  - Density: 29.2/sq mi (11.3/km^{2})
- Time zone: UTC-08:00 (PST)
  - Summer (DST): UTC-07:00 (PDT)
- ZIP code: 96120
- Area codes: 530, 837
- FIPS code: 06-45988
- GNIS feature IDs: 1659065, 2408184

Markleeville (formerly Markleville) is a census-designated place (CDP) in and the county seat of Alpine County, California, United States. The population was 191 at the 2020 census, down from 210 at the 2010 census.

== History ==
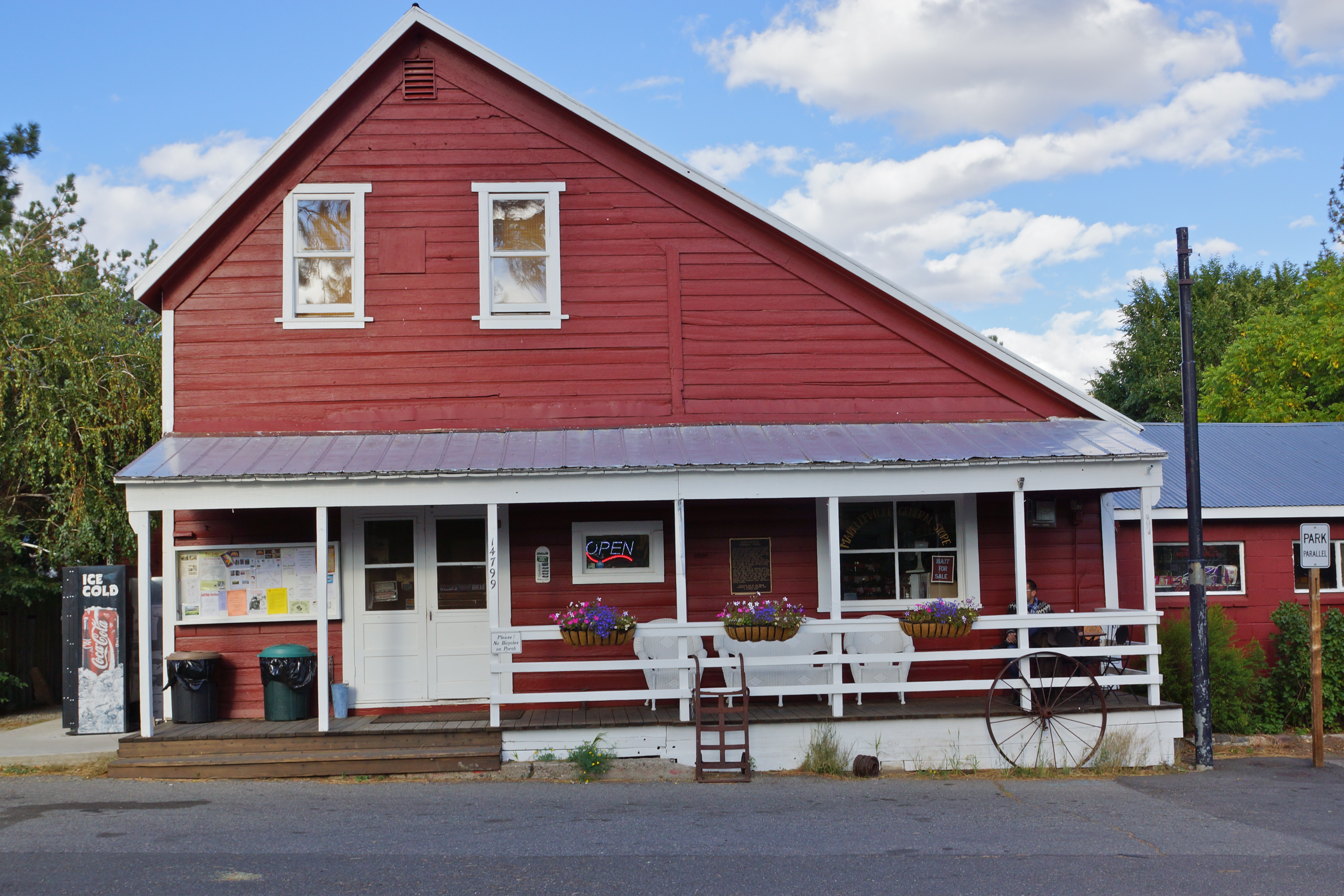
The general store.

Jacob J. Marklee founded a toll bridge crossing the Carson River in 1861. He aimed to tap into the traffic from the silver mining boom at Silver Mountain City. On June 23, 1862, he recorded a land claim of 160 acres in Douglas County, Nevada. A boundary survey took place, and the property ended up being in California. In 1863, Marklee died after being involved in a gunfight. When the Comstock Lode discovery took place, the town of Markleeville was founded on the Marklee property. Today, the Alpine County Courthouse sits on the former property, which is listed as a California Historical Landmark.

A post office opened in Markleeville in 1863.

== Geography ==
According to the United States Census Bureau, the CDP has a total area of 6.5 square miles (17 km^{2}), all land. The region comprising Markleeville is alpine in appearance, with lush grassy valley areas. There is a hot spring, and a state park with a campground. Excellent hiking trails abound.

=== Climate ===
According to the Köppen Climate Classification system, Markleeville has a warm-summer Mediterranean climate, abbreviated Csb on climate maps, though it approaches a Humid continental climate (Dsb).

Markleeville has warm to hot summers with only occasional rainfall, mostly from afternoon and evening thunderstorms; nights are usually well below 50 °F (10 °C). Winters are somewhat cold and often snowy. The average January temperatures are a maximum of 45.7 °F or 7.6 °C and a minimum of 17.4 °F or −8.1 °C. The average July temperatures are a maximum of 84.5 °F (29.2 °C) and a minimum of 43.1 °F or 6.2 °C. There are an average of 15.7 afternoons with highs of 90 °F or 32.2 °C or higher and an average of 221.7 mornings with lows of 32 °F or 0 °C or lower, including 5.4 mornings falling to or below 0 °F or −17.8 °C, and 8.1 afternoons that do not top freezing. The record high temperature was 102 °F (38.9 °C) on July 11, 1931. The record low temperature was −25 °F (−31.7 °C) on December 22, 1990.

Average annual precipitation is 19.18 inches or 487.2 millimetres. There are an average of 59 days with measurable precipitation. The wettest calendar year was 1996 with 38.35 inches (974.1 mm) and the driest year was 1917 with 11.74 inches (298.2 mm). The most precipitation in one month occurred in January 1914 with 16.13 inches (409.7 mm). The most precipitation in 24 hours was 4.72 inches (119.9 mm) on December 3, 1950. Average annual snowfall is 82.9 inches or 2.11 metres, and snow depths of over 60 inches or 1.52 metres were recorded during the very cold months of January 1916 and February 1922 – the average depth of snow on the ground in January being 8 inches or 0.20 metres. The snowiest year was 1916 with 144.0 inches (3.66 m), including 99.0 inches (2.51 m) in January 1916.

Climate data for Markleeville, California (045356)
Month	Jan	Feb	Mar	Apr	May	Jun	Jul	Aug	Sep	Oct	Nov	Dec	Year
Record high °F (°C)	66 (19)	69 (21)	80 (27)	82 (28)	90 (32)	94 (34)	102 (39)	101 (38)	98 (37)	87 (31)	75 (24)	67 (19)	102 (39)
Mean daily maximum °F (°C)	45.7 (7.6)	46.9 (8.3)	53.8 (12.1)	58.9 (14.9)	66.4 (19.1)	75.6 (24.2)	84.5 (29.2)	84.7 (29.3)	77.8 (25.4)	67.0 (19.4)	53.4 (11.9)	44.6 (7.0)	63.3 (17.4)
Mean daily minimum °F (°C)	17.4 (−8.1)	19.0 (−7.2)	23.5 (−4.7)	27.1 (−2.7)	33.1 (0.6)	38.1 (3.4)	43.1 (6.2)	42.1 (5.6)	35.5 (1.9)	28.1 (−2.2)	21.8 (−5.7)	16.3 (−8.7)	28.8 (−1.8)
Record low °F (°C)	−20 (−29)	−21 (−29)	−15 (−26)	9 (−13)	10 (−12)	24 (−4)	26 (−3)	25 (−4)	18 (−8)	6 (−14)	−7 (−22)	−25 (−32)	−25 (−32)
Average precipitation inches (mm)	3.72 (94)	3.14 (80)	2.10 (53)	1.26 (32)	0.99 (25)	0.60 (15)	0.39 (9.9)	0.46 (12)	0.47 (12)	0.93 (24)	2.11 (54)	3.01 (76)	19.18 (486.9)
Average snowfall inches (cm)	21.8 (55)	19.2 (49)	13.1 (33)	4.8 (12)	1.4 (3.6)	0.2 (0.51)	0.0 (0.0)	0.0 (0.0)	0.1 (0.25)	0.6 (1.5)	5.6 (14)	16.1 (41)	82.9 (209.86)
Average precipitation days (≥ 0.01 inch)	8	8	6	5	5	3	3	3	3	4	5	7	60
Source: Western Regional Climate Center

== Demographics ==
Historical population
Census	Pop.	Note	%±
2000	197		—
2010	210		6.6%
2020	191		−9.0%
U.S. Decennial Census; 1860–1870 1880-1890; 1900 1910 1920; 1930 1940 1950; 1960 1970 1980; 1990 2000 2010; 2020

Markleeville first appeared as a census designated place in the 2000 U.S. census.

=== 2020 census ===
Markleeville CDP, California – Racial and ethnic composition Note: the US Census treats Hispanic/Latino as an ethnic category. This table excludes Latinos from the racial categories and assigns them to a separate category. Hispanics/Latinos may be of any race.
Race / Ethnicity (NH = Non-Hispanic)	Pop 2000	Pop 2010	Pop 2020	% 2000	% 2010	% 2020
White alone (NH)	189	187	168	95.94%	89.05%	87.96%
Black or African American alone (NH)	0	0	2	0.00%	0.00%	1.05%
Native American or Alaska Native alone (NH)	3	4	0	1.52%	1.90%	0.00%
Asian alone (NH)	0	2	3	0.00%	0.95%	1.57%
Native Hawaiian or Pacific Islander alone (NH)	0	0	0	0.00%	0.00%	0.00%
Other race alone (NH)	2	0	2	1.02%	0.00%	1.05%
Mixed race or Multiracial (NH)	0	6	7	0.00%	2.86%	3.66%
Hispanic or Latino (any race)	3	11	9	1.52%	5.24%	4.71%
Total	197	210	191	100.00%	100.00%	100.00%

The 2020 United States census reported that Markleeville had a population of 191. The population density was 29.2 inhabitants per square mile (11.3/km^{2}). The racial makeup of Markleeville was 90.1% White, 1.0% African American, 0.0% Native American, 1.6% Asian, 0.0% Pacific Islander, 2.1% from other races, and 5.2% from two or more races. Hispanic or Latino of any race were 4.7% of the population.

There were 96 households, out of which 20.8% included children under the age of 18, 31.3% were married-couple households, 6.3% were cohabiting couple households, 21.9% had a female householder with no partner present, and 40.6% had a male householder with no partner present. 52.1% of households were one person, and 33.3% were one person aged 65 or older. The average household size was 1.99. There were 42 families (43.8% of all households).

The age distribution was 13.6% under the age of 18, 7.9% aged 18 to 24, 12.0% aged 25 to 44, 37.2% aged 45 to 64, and 29.3% who were 65 years of age or older. The median age was 57.6 years. There were 110 males and 81 females.

There were 184 housing units at an average density of 28.2 units per square mile (10.9 units/km^{2}), of which 96 (52.2%) were occupied. Of these, 81.3% were owner-occupied, and 18.8% were occupied by renters.

== Arts and culture ==
Markleeville hosts an annual bicycle ride called the Death Ride - Tour of the California Alps. The route goes over five mountain passes for a total distance of 129 miles and over 15,000 feet of elevation gain. In 2010, 3,500 riders participated and 2,417 completed the full course. Markleeville hosts the Woollystar Music Festival annually, a three day event featuring folk and country music that began in 2012.
