= California State Route 88 =

Highway in California

State Route 88

- SR 88 highlighted in red

Route information
- Maintained by Caltrans
- Length: 122 mi (196 km)
- Tourist routes: Carson Pass Highway

Major junctions
- West end: SR 99 near Stockton
- SR 12 from Lockeford to Clements; SR 49 from Martell to Jackson; SR 89 from Hope Valley to Woodfords
- East end: SR 88 at state line near Minden, NV

Location
- Country: United States
- State: California
- Counties: San Joaquin, Amador, Alpine

Highway system
- State highways in California; Interstate; US; State; Scenic; History; Pre‑1964; Unconstructed; Deleted; Freeways
← SR 87	→ SR 89

State Route 88 (SR 88), also known as the Carson Pass Highway, is a state highway in the U.S. state of California. It travels in an east–west direction from Stockton, in the San Joaquin Valley, to the Nevada state line, where it becomes Nevada State Route 88, eventually terminating at U.S. Route 395 (US 395). The highway is so named as it crests the Sierra Nevada at Carson Pass. The highway corridor predates the era of the automobile; the path over Carson pass was previously used for the California Trail and the Mormon Emigrant Trail. The mountainous portion of the route is included in the State Scenic Highway System.

SR 88 is one of the few trans-Sierra state routes that Caltrans attempts to keep open year-round. Caltrans has winter closures in effect for all Sierra Nevada highway passes between Carson Pass and Walker Pass (SR 178), a span of over 200 miles (320 km). SR 88 follows a ridge to ascend most of the western slope of the Sierra Nevada. The highway is occasionally used as a detour when U.S. Route 50, which follows the South Fork American River to ascend the Sierra Nevada, is flooded or otherwise closed.

== Route description ==
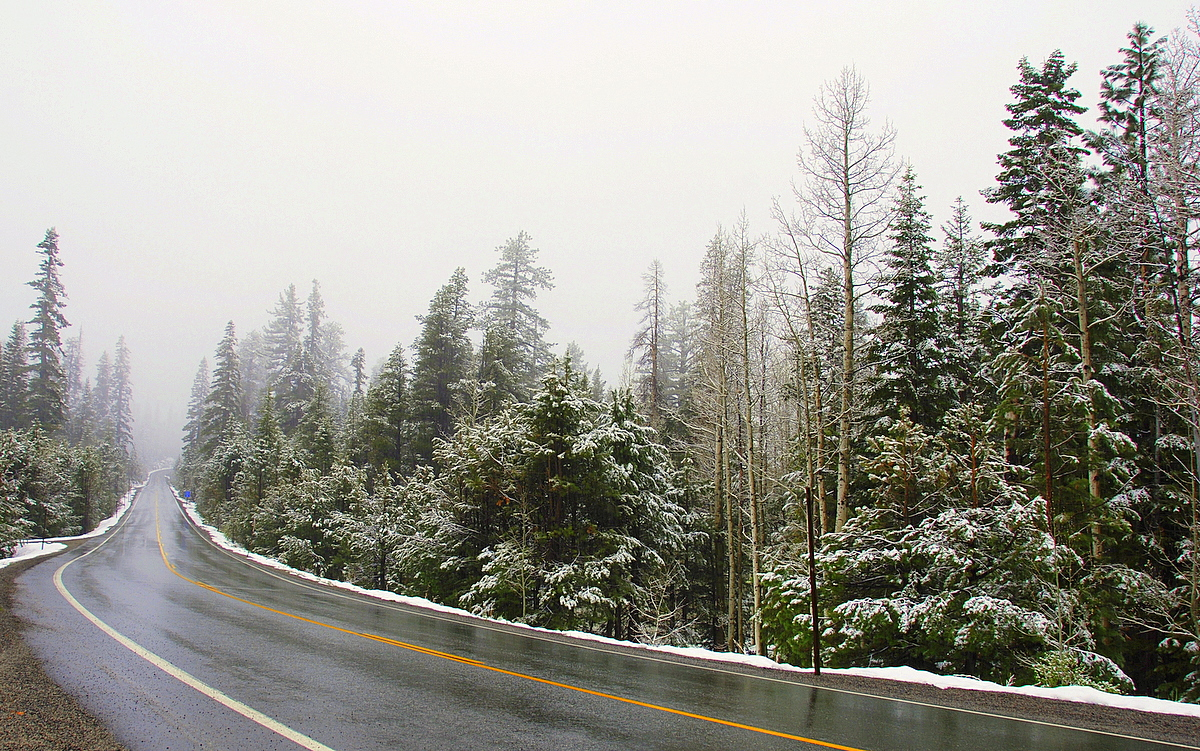
Spring storm on May 28, 2008

Route 88 is defined in section 388 of the California Streets and Highways Code. The definition omits the concurrency with Route 49 instead of duplicating that segment in the other route's definition in the code:

Route 88 is from:
(a) Route 99 near Stockton to Route 49 passing south of Ione.
(b) Route 49 in Jackson to the Nevada state line via Pine Grove, Silver Lake, and Kirkwood.

SR 88 begins just outside Stockton as Waterloo Road, heading northeast towards Waterloo and Lockeford. After leaving the city, the route passes by several farms, vineyards and orchards, some of which have roadside stands and stores, in between the small towns in the San Joaquin Valley served by the route. While passing through farming villages in the valley, the highway has a brief concurrency with SR 12. The two routes separate to pass along opposite sides of the Camanche Reservoir, where SR 88 enters Amador County. As the road enters Amador County, the route begins an ascent up the foothills of the Sierra Nevada towards Jackson.

Between Sunnybrook and Martell, the road runs adjacent the corridor of the Amador Central Railroad, an abandoned freight rail line, purchased and operated by the Amador County Historical Society and other heritage railway enthusiasts who sponsor occasional train rides along the route. The route enters Jackson, the largest town traversed in the Sierra foothills by the highway. The highway runs concurrent with SR 49 through the town. Many locations along SR 49, including Jackson, originated as settlements during the California Gold Rush of 1849, and have a rich gold mining history. Both routes 49 and 88 have been re-routed around the historic part of downtown and onto a four-lane road to the west of the historic district. SR 88 separates from SR 49 and leaves Jackson following Jackson Creek to climb to the small town of Pine Grove. Along this ascent the road passes to the south of the Jackson Rancheria of Me-Wuk Indians and SR 88 is used as an access road for both the tribal nation and the Jackson Rancheria Casino Resort operated by the tribe.

To scale the western slope of the Sierra Nevada, East of Pine Grove Highway 88 follows a ridge that separates the watershed of the North Fork Mokelumne River to the south of the highway, with a number of other watersheds to the north. At lower elevations the watershed to the north of this ridge is initially Sutter Creek, later the South Fork Cosumnes River, and later still that of the Middle Fork Cosmunes River. At the highest elevations the watershed to the north of the road and the ridge is the Silver Fork American River. Several overlooks are located at spots where SR 88 follows this ridge which provide views into the canyons of each of these rivers. For several miles this ridge, and by extension SR 88, form the boundary between Amador and El Dorado County. In the lower parts of this ridge are the settlements of Pioneer and Buckhorn. Two small settlements are located in the higher elevations of this ridge, Cooks Station, and Ham's Station. Both of these are today known as locations where Caltrans implements traveling restrictions during winter storms, such as requiring tire chains, restricting certain vehicles or complete closures. Where this ridge crosses the divide between the Cosumnes and American Rivers is where the road joins the Mormon Emigrant Trail, which follows a different ridge up the mountains from the modern U.S. Route 50 corridor near Sly Park. This trail is so named for the Mormons in California during the gold rush, who created this path to rejoin the Mormon migration to Utah. Approximately 5 miles (8.0 km) east of Silver Lake, Route 88 reaches a geographic feature known as the Carson Spur. This is where this ridge effectively ends, and the road follows a dynamited path down to the Kirkwood Mountain Resort and the small town of Kirkwood, where the road crosses into Alpine County. The Carson Spur section is prone to frequent avalanches in the winter and is periodically closed for avalanche control measures. In the final push up to Carson Pass the road passes by Caples Lake.

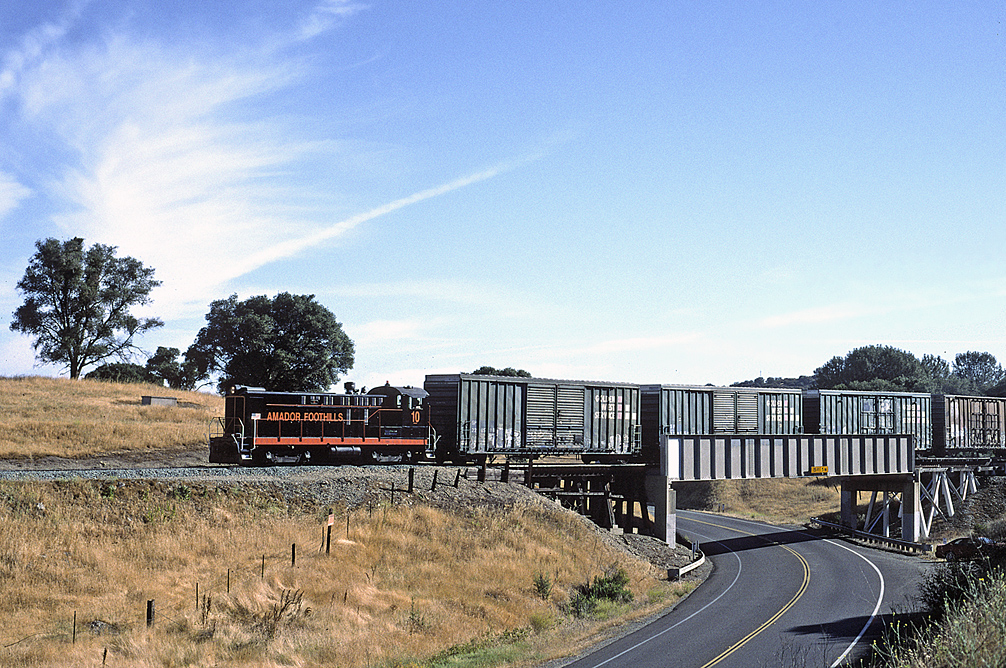
Picture of the last freight train to run on the Amador Central Railroad before the line was retired, as it crosses SR 88 near Sunnybrook

While the road uses ridges for the western approach to Carson Pass, the eastern approach rapidly descends into the West Fork Carson River canyon, reaching the river level in Hope Valley. Along this descent, the road features a view area overlooking Red Lake. The highway joins with SR 89 while inside the valley, at a place known as Pickett's Junction. The two routes run concurrent through Woodfords Canyon of the Carson River, which provides the final descent out of the Sierra Nevada. At the mouth of the canyon is the small town of Woodfords, where SR 89 separates from SR 88 and proceeds towards Markleeville. Hope Valley, Woodsfords Canyon and Markleeville are often cited as one of the best areas for autumn foliage viewing in the state of California. Shortly after exiting the mountains the highway reaches the Carson Valley, where it turns due north and becomes one of the main thoroughfares of the valley. SR 88 reaches the Nevada state line where it becomes Nevada State Route 88 which proceeds due north towards U.S. Route 395.

SR 88 is part of the California Freeway and Expressway System and the National Highway System. The portion over the Sierra Nevada is included in the State Scenic Highway System and is designated a National Forest Scenic Byway. Per Annual Average Daily Traffic data for 2020, the western terminus near Stockton is the most heavily used part of the road, averaging 24,100 vehicles per day. The lightest traffic counts, 1,450 vehicles per day, are at the Kirkwood turnoff. However, Caltrans notes that there is significant seasonal variation for traffic at the ski resort, with peak month traffic counts increasing to 3,600 vehicles per day at this location. Route 88 is one of three routes to continue with the same route number after crossing into Nevada, the others being Routes 28 and 266.

== History ==
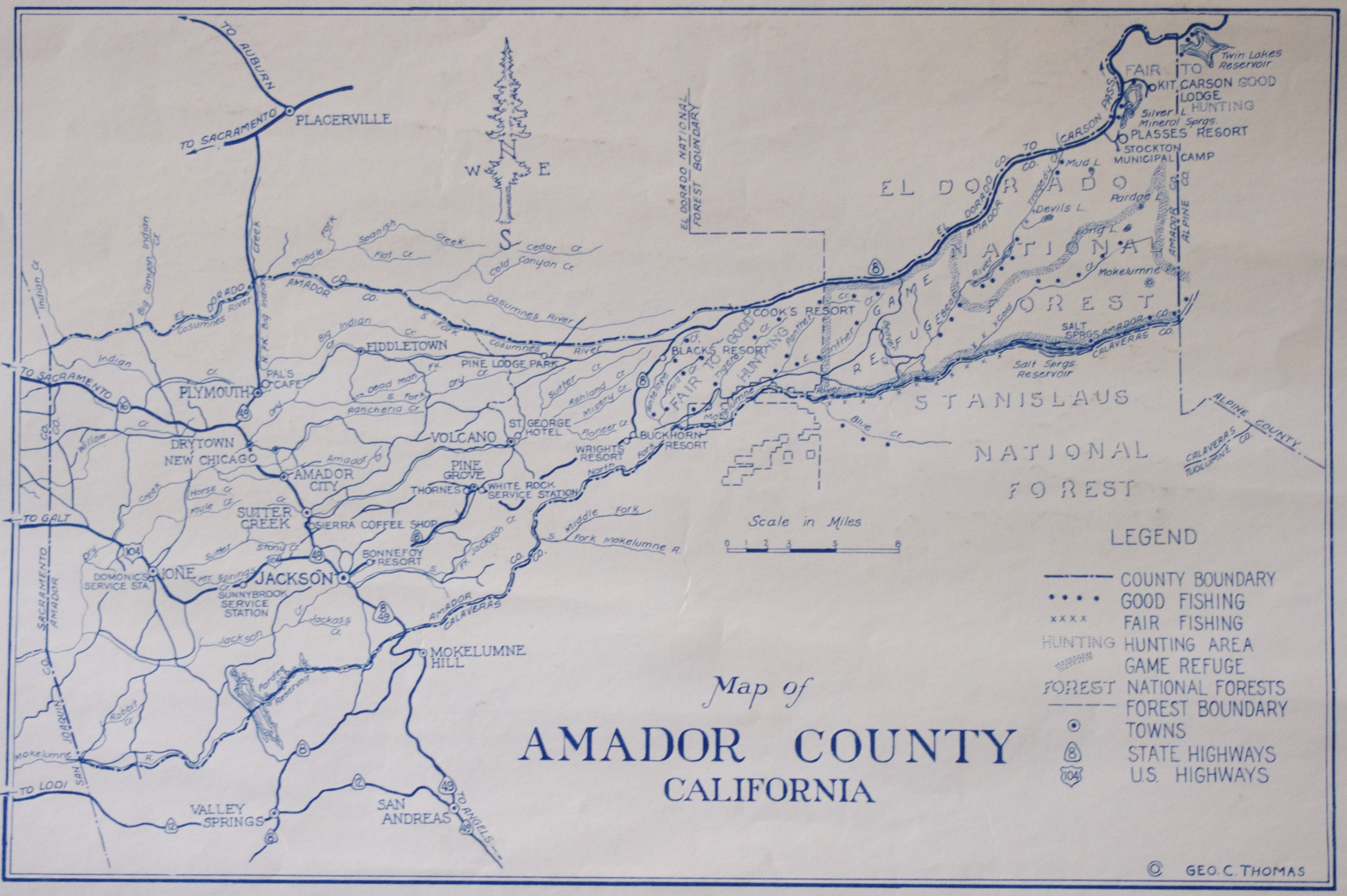
SR 8 in Amador County, circa 1930s

The portion of Route 88 east of Antelope Springs, near Buckhorn, started as the Amador/Nevada Wagon Route, a toll road with a franchise granted in 1852 and surveyed in 1857. While the route was based on the existing Kit Carson trail and Old Emigrant Road, among the primary reasons for granting the toll road franchise was to fund a realignment of the portion from Tragedy Spring to Caples Lake. In its original form, the road connected these landmarks by looping around the Silver Lake basin, over a high mountain ridge near Emigrant Lake reaching an elevation of 9,640 feet (2,940 m). This was a treacherous routing, and was rerouted via blasting a path through the Carson Spur in 1863. The path through the Carson Spur was re-dynamited and widened to its current form in 1960.

The first numerical designation for the Amador County portion of modern SR 88 was SR 8, which overlaps the present highway from Alpine County to Jackson. Unlike modern SR 88, it continued south to Mokelumne Hill, then to Valley Springs along modern State Route 26 and a small portion of SR 49. A portion of modern Route 88 west of Jackson was then part of SR 104. During the 1940s, maps of the area showed both the 8 and 88 designations in use. The original alignment south and west of Jackson retained the SR 8 designation, while the modern alignment of SR 88, where the roads existed, used the 88 designation.

Significant parts of the highway have been re-aligned and improved from the original wagon trail. A bypass of Jackson's historical district was completed in 1948. The modern form of the highway was assigned the 88 designation by the time the California Department of Highways, predecessor agency to Caltrans, announced major upgrades for the highway were in progress or recently completed in 1958. Already completed was a re-alignment of the eastern approach to Carson Pass. Originally the eastern approach ran along the south shore of Red Lake. The realigned highway passes the lake to the north. This change lengthened the approach, but reduced the grade. Improvements expected to be completed soon included paving a road to be used for the highway west of Martell towards what is today SR 124 and re-alignments along parts of the ridge, including bypassing a mountain in the ridge area called Peddler's Hill.

The highway was not originally maintained in the winter, but became the most recent trans-Sierra Nevada highway to remain open year round in 1971. This change coincided with a change in ownership, and construction to significantly expand what is now called the Kirkwood Mountain Resort - which lies between Carson Pass and the Carson Spur. The developers building the resort agreed to build and donate maintenance facilities for Caltrans and contribute funds for snow plowing.

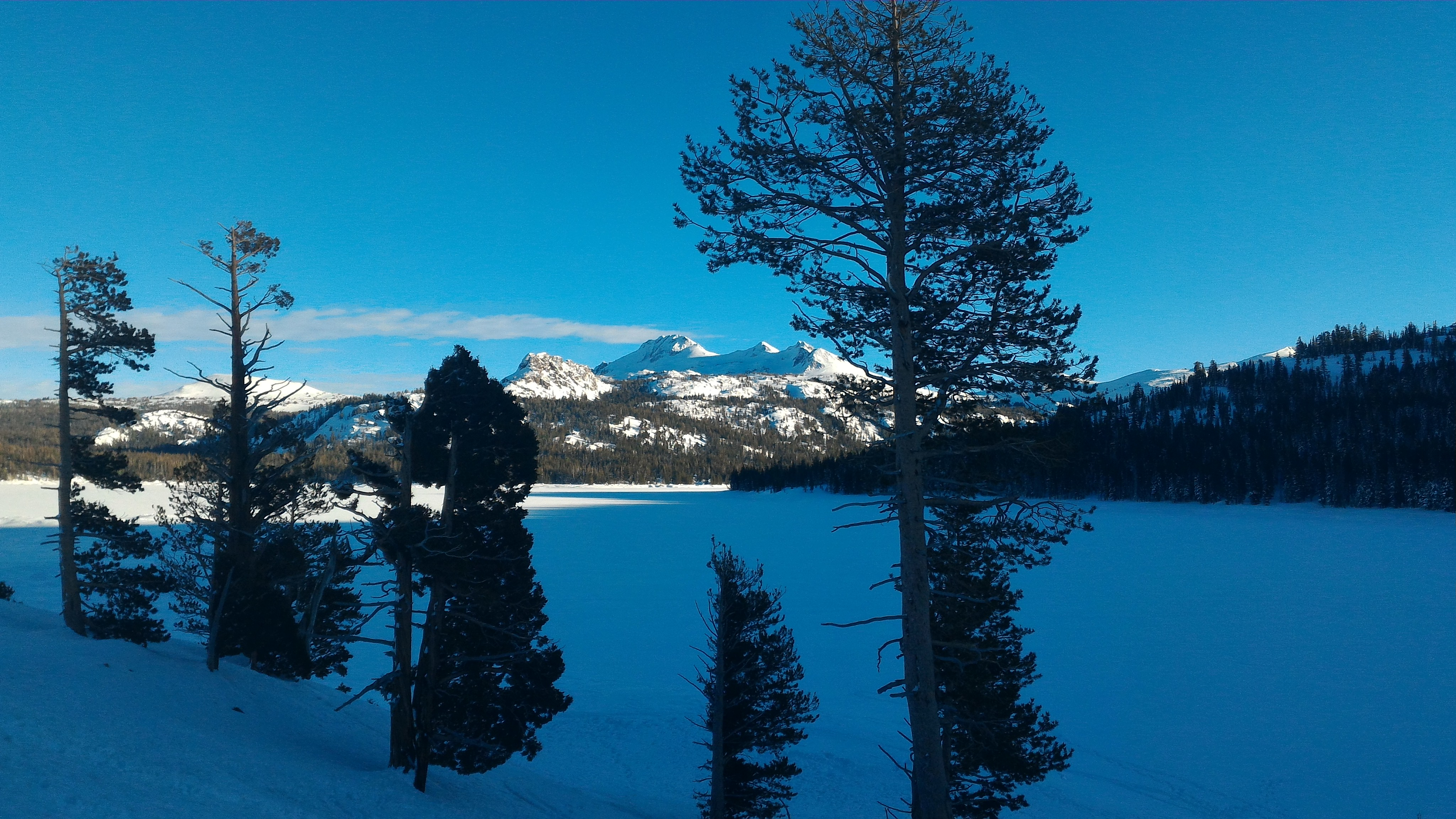
A view of a frozen Caples Lake, taken from California State Route 88

=== Historical landmarks ===
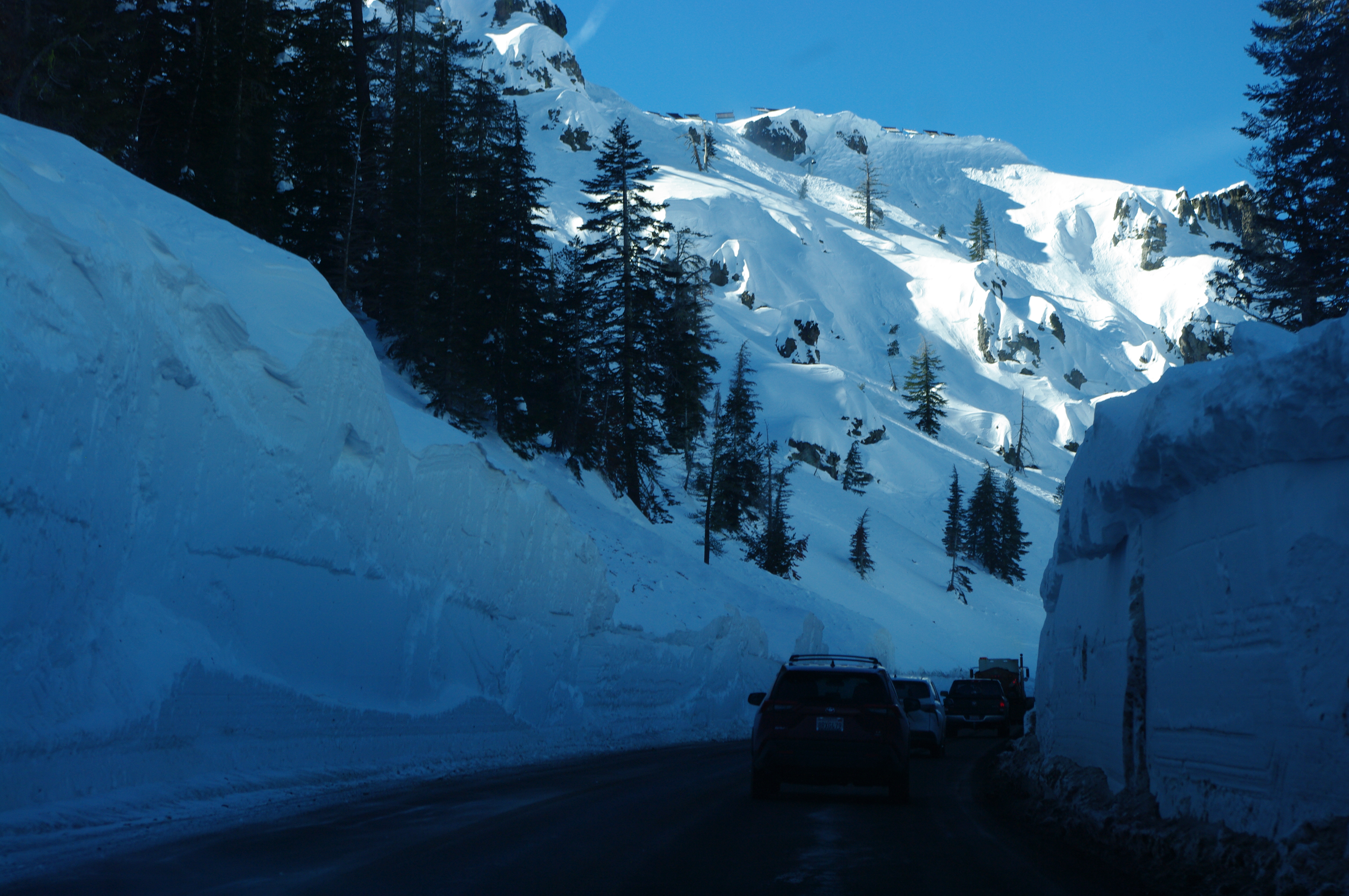
The Carson Spur after a snowstorm showing snow levels exceeding the height of the passing cars

As the SR 88 corridor has history that predates the automobile, there are a number of historical markers and landmarks along the roadway. These include:

- The Trail of the 1844 John C. Frémont Expedition, at the northwest corner of the Calaveras River (postmile SJ 6.09)
- Clinton, on Clinton Road, south of the highway, in Pine Grove—Clinton was the center of a placer mining community during the 1850s and of quartz mining as late as the 1880s. This town once decided Amador County elections as its votes were always counted last.
- Irishtown, at the intersection of Pine Grove Wieland Road in Pine Grove—This was an important stopping place for emigrants on their way to the Southern Mines. The first white settlers on this spot found it a "city of wigwams," and hundreds of mortars in the rocks testify that this was a favorite Indian camping ground.
- Maiden's Grave, burial place of Rachel Melton (d. 1850), a young girl who died while traveling to California via covered wagon (postmile AMA 61.3)
- Cooks Station, a store and restaurant built in the 1860s and still in operation, elevation 5,000 feet (1,500 m)
- Ham's Station is a historic restaurant and convenience store, first established in 1855, with current structures built cerca 1879. It originally served as a toll station on the highway.
- Tragedy Spring, where three of the Mormons who helped build the Mormon Emigrant Trail were killed.
- Two markers note the original alignment of the Old Emigrant Road that was bypassed with the construction via the Carson Spur. One is at the intersection of Mud Lake Road (postmile AMA 63.1). The second marker is at postmile ALP 2.4, at Caples Lake.
- The Kit Carson Marker (CHL #315, postmile ALP 5.2), at the summit of Carson Pass, marks where Carson carved his name into a tree in 1844 while guiding John C. Frémont through the Sierra Nevada. The original can be found at Sutter's Fort, Sacramento.
- On some large rocks near Carson Pass, a group of pioneers inscribed their names and the emblem of the Independent Order of Odd Fellows in 1849 (postmile ALP 5.3).

== Major intersections ==
Except where prefixed with a letter, postmiles were measured on the road as it was in 1964, based on the alignment that existed at the time, and do not necessarily reflect current mileage. Postmile prefixes include: R reflecting a realignment in the route since then, M indicating a second realignment, L referring to an overlap due to a correction or change, and T indicating postmiles classified as temporary. Segments that remain unconstructed or have been relinquished to local control may be omitted. The numbers reset at county lines; the start and end postmiles in each county are given in the county column.

County	Location	Postmile	Destinations	Notes
San Joaquin; SJ 0.00-25.37		0.00	Waterloo Road	Continuation beyond SR 99
San Joaquin; SJ 0.00-25.37		0.00	SR 99 – Sacramento, Fresno	Interchange; western end of SR 88; SR 99 exit 255
San Joaquin; SJ 0.00-25.37	Lockeford	L12.24	SR 12 west (Victor Road) – Lodi	Western end of SR 12 overlap
San Joaquin; SJ 0.00-25.37	Lockeford	13.60	CR J5 south (Jack Tone Bypass to Jack Tone Road)	Western end of CR J5 overlap
San Joaquin; SJ 0.00-25.37	Lockeford	14.08	CR J5 north (Elliott Road) / Tully Road	Eastern end of CR J5 overlap
San Joaquin; SJ 0.00-25.37	Clements	19.17	SR 12 east – San Andreas	Eastern end of SR 12 overlap
San Joaquin; SJ 0.00-25.37		20.27	CR J12 (Collier Road)	Eastern terminus of CR J12
San Joaquin; SJ 0.00-25.37		22.09	Liberty Road	Roundabout; serves Lake Camanche North Shore
Amador; AMA 0.00-71.65		5.53	SR 124 north – Ione, Placerville	Southern terminus of SR 124
Amador; AMA 0.00-71.65		7.39	SR 104 west / Jackson Valley Road – Ione	Western end of SR 104 overlap
Amador; AMA 0.00-71.65		12.68	SR 104 east (Ridge Road) – Sutter Creek	Eastern end of SR 104 overlap
Amador; AMA 0.00-71.65	Martell	14.25 5.93 (Note: Indicates that the postmile represents the distance along SR 49 rather than SR 88.)	SR 49 north – Sutter Creek, Placerville	Western end of SR 49 overlap
Amador; AMA 0.00-71.65	Jackson	4.03 14.29	SR 49 south – Mokelumne Hill, San Andreas	Eastern end of SR 49 overlap
Amador; AMA 0.00-71.65	Pine Grove	22.69	Ridge Road – Sutter Creek	
Amador; AMA 0.00-71.65	Pine Grove	23.36	Pine Grove-Volcano Road – Volcano	
Amador; AMA 0.00-71.65		R26.79	SR 26 west (Red Corral Road) – West Point	Eastern terminus of SR 26
Amador; AMA 0.00-71.65		R58.67	Mormon Emigrant Trail	Former US 50 Alt. west
Alpine; ALP 0.00-25.28		R5.23	Carson Pass, elevation 8,573 feet (2,613 m)	
Alpine; ALP 0.00-25.28		13.40	SR 89 north / Burnside Lake Road – Lake Tahoe	Western end of SR 89 overlap; former US 50 Alt. east
Alpine; ALP 0.00-25.28	Woodfords	19.22	SR 89 south to SR 4 – Markleeville	Eastern end of SR 89 overlap
Alpine; ALP 0.00-25.28		25.28	SR 88 north – Minden	Continuation into Nevada; eastern end of SR 88
1.000 mi = 1.609 km; 1.000 km = 0.621 mi: Concurrency terminus

== See also ==
- Eldorado National Forest, Amador Ranger Station, Pioneer
- Indian Grinding Rock State Historic Park, Pine Grove
- Mount Zion State Park, Pine Grove
- Sorensen's Resort, Hope Valley
