= Tragedy Spring =

Mountain spring, named after the nearby murder of three Mormon men

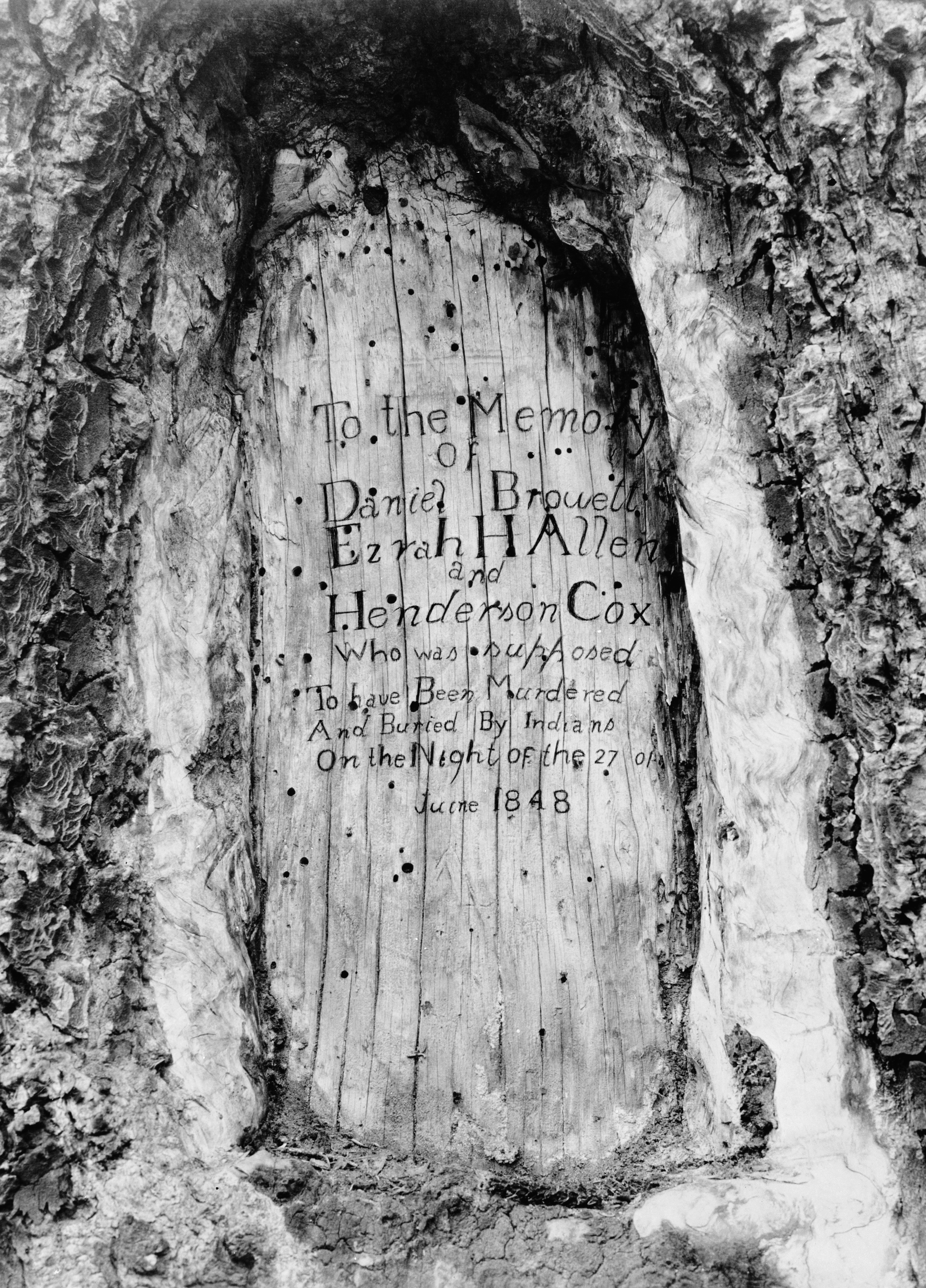
- 1848 tree carving memorial at Tragedy Spring
- Interactive map of Tragedy Spring
- Type: Gravesite; Historic migration trail
- Location: El Dorado County, California; United States
- Coordinates: 38°38′23″N 120°8′50″W
- Elevation: 7,960 feet (2,430 m)
- Governing body: Eldorado National Forest

Tragedy Spring is a small alpine freshwater spring and historical site in southern El Dorado County, California. (Note: The location of Tragedy Spring was traditionally believed to be in Amador County, California, but the actual site is just within El Dorado County, by a matter of feet.) It was named after an incident on June 27, 1848, in which three Mormon men (who were among the group blazing the Mormon Emigrant Trail) were killed, allegedly by American Indians. For many years, a tree carving with the names of the murdered men—Daniel Browett, Ezrah H. Allen, and Henderson Cox—stood as a memorial at their gravesite, before it was cut out and moved indoors for preservation; today it is located in the museum located at Marshall Gold Discovery State Historic Park in Coloma, California.

The site is located adjacent to Highway 88, approximately two miles west of Silver Lake. Presently, a few memorials to the tragedy are located at a small forest park, established at the site in 1967.

== History ==
=== Mormons in Alta California ===
During the Mexican–American War (1846–1848), many members of the Church of Jesus Christ of Latter-day Saints (LDS Church), commonly called Mormons or Latter-day Saints, traveled to Alta California, then a Mexican territory. Brigham Young, the church's president, along with a wagon train of Mormon pioneers arrived in Mexico's Salt Lake Valley during July 1847, and established Salt Lake City as the principal settlement for church members.

Prior to this, a number of Mormons had already arrived on the West Coast of the continent via other means. This included the Brooklyn Saints who had sailed from New York City to Yerba Buena (today known as San Francisco), arriving in July 1846. Additionally, approximately 360 Mormons who made up the US Army's Mormon Battalion had marched from Council Bluffs, Iowa to San Diego to assist in the war effort. The war's fighting was largely at an end when the Battalion arrived in San Diego during January 1847, and the unit's companies were then assigned to San Diego, Fort Moore at Pueblo de Los Ángeles, and San Luis Rey, where they helped settlers develop their new communities.

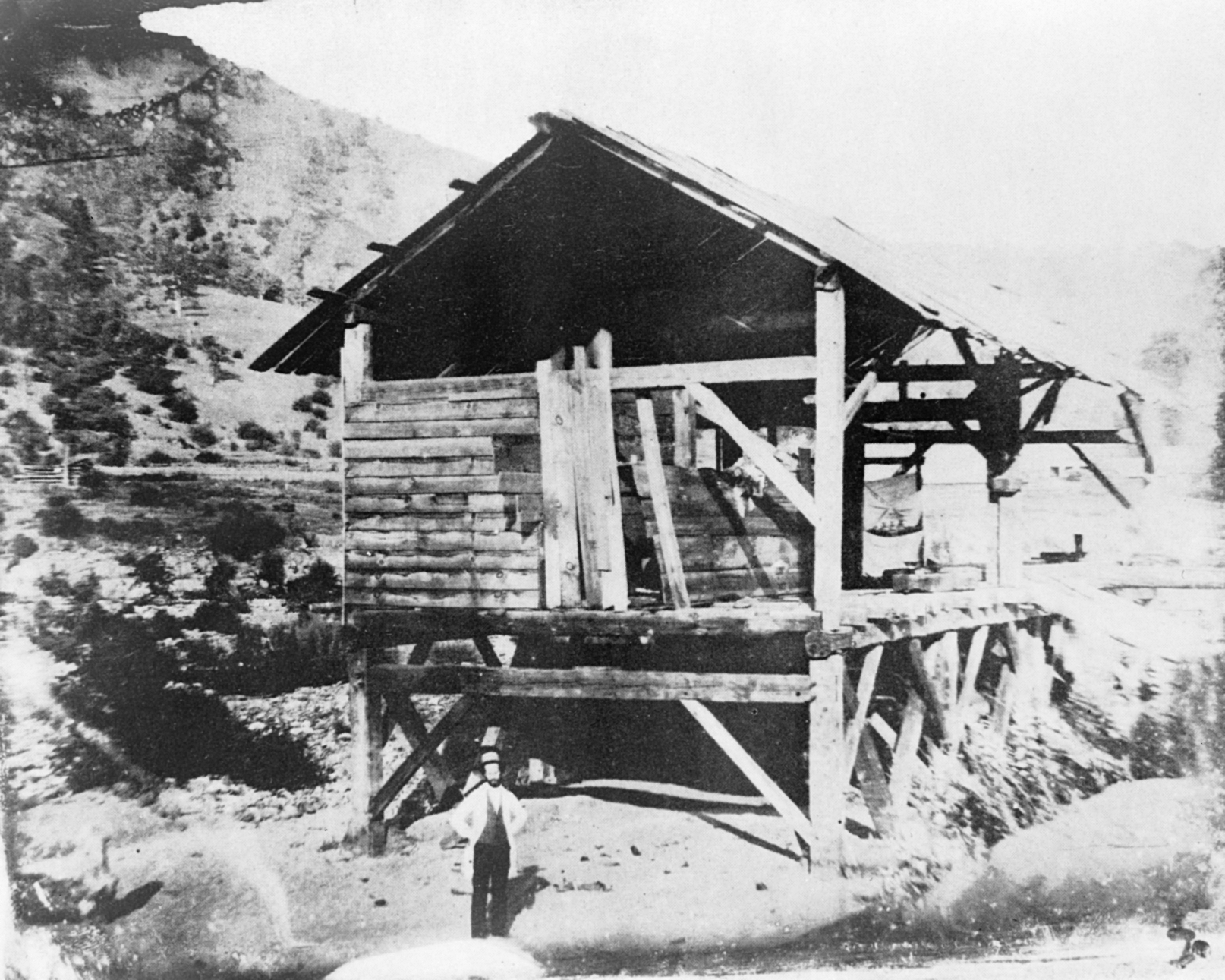
Sutter's Mill, built with the assistance of Mormon workers and the location of 1848's gold discovery

The Battalion members were discharged in July 1847, after which the members broke into various groups–some reenlisted and others made plans to travel east and rejoin their families and fellow church members. Near Donner Pass, this returning group encountered a messenger from Brigham Young, who asked any former Battalion members without adequate supplies to remain in California for a season, to earn wages and purchase supplies, then to come on to Salt Lake City. About half the group turned back and went in the employ of John Sutter, while the other half continued on to Salt Lake City. While employed by Sutter, some were assigned tasks at Sutter's Fort and others were sent into the mountains to build Sutter's Mill. Several ex-Battalion members were present when gold was discovered at the mill site in January 1848, kicking off the California gold rush. Following the discovery, the Mormons would spend their time off mining for gold.

=== Return east ===
On March 1, 1848, the employment contract with Sutter expired and the ex-Battalion members began to make plans to head east, as they had stayed a season as requested by Young. On May 1, an advance group under the command of Daniel Browett, set out to find an alternative route over the Sierra Nevada mountains, as they planned to avoid crossing at Donner Pass. They found the snow still piled too high and decided to put off travel for several weeks. They spent these weeks panning for gold and obtaining additional supplies. A meeting place was established, called Pleasant Valley, where those Mormons in California wishing to travel to Salt Lake City could gather. Throughout the month of June, a number of different Mormon groups, including some who had arrived on the Brooklyn in 1846, gathered in Pleasant Valley. During the gathering, they continued to mine for gold, a venture in which they found much success.

On June 25, 1848, Daniel Browett again set out to scout a trail, accompanied by Ezra H. Allen and Henderson Cox. Each of the scouts had their riding animal, a pack mule, their army-issued muskets, along with the gold they had discovered. Journals kept by those still gathering at Pleasant Valley record that many tried to persuade the three men to remain and travel with the larger group, but the scouts were anxious to start and promised to wait for the main party further up in the mountains.

On July 3, the main company moved out of Pleasant Valley. The following day, they camped in a meadow they called Sly Park, here, growing concerned about the wellbeing of the three scouts, ten men were sent out to search for them. Several days later, the search party returned with no success and the party moved on from Sly Park.

=== Discovery of the bodies ===
On July 18, the road crew (working slightly ahead of the main party) came across a spring and an extinguished campfire. Nearby they found a newly made mound of dirt, which some thought might be a grave, possibly containing their missing companions. Leaving the mound undisturbed, they returned to the main party to share news of the discovery. As they made their way back, the road crew encountered a group of Native Americans, one of which was thought to be wearing a vest belonging to one of the missing scouts.

On July 19, the entire party arrived at the spring and at once proceeded to open the shallow grave. Inside they discovered the naked bodies of the three missing scouts. Into Browett's face had been sunk an ax or hatchet and one of his eyes had been penetrated. Allen laid next to Browett in the grave, with Cox underneath; around Allen's neck was a withe, likely used to help drag his body to the grave. Around the site were bloody arrows and blood-stained rocks, some with locks of hair stuck to them, possibly from being used to crush skulls. Everything belonging to the men had been taken, save for a small pouch which belonged to Allen, which had likely slid off his body and went unnoticed by the attackers.

The following day, the party dug a new grave for the men, which was surrounded by a rock wall with additional stones piled on top; a large, rounded stone was placed upright at the top of the grave to act as a headstone. Wilford Hudson used his axe to chop the bark away from one side of a nearby fir tree, after which he carved this memorial:

To the Memory
of
Daniel Browett
Ezrah H Allen
and
Henderson Cox
Who was supposed
To have Been Murdered
And Buried By Indians
On the Night of the 27 of
June 1848

Now known as the Holmes-Thompson Company, the party named the place Tragedy Spring and moved on to Salt Lake City, arriving there in September 1848. The legacy of this party was the construction of the first wagon road over Carson Pass, today remembered as the Mormon Emigrant or Carson Trail, which was heavily used by pioneers later bound for the California gold fields.

=== Allen's gold pouch ===
As the company opened the grave and investigated the scene, they discovered only one item that had belonged to one of the scouts–Allen's blood-stained pouch, which contained gold dust and coin. They proposed that when the perpetrators were removing Allen's clothing, the pouch had slipped from around his neck and went undiscovered, possibly because the attack may have occurred in the dark.

Wilford Hudson, a close friend of Allen, volunteered to take the pouch to Allen's wife, Sarah. She had not yet traveled to Salt Lake City and remained in the temporary Mormon settlement of Kanesville, on the east bank of the Missouri River. It was here that she received word of her husband's murder and using the gold delivered to her, she had a wedding ring made and purchased the necessary goods to travel to the Utah Territory.

=== Perpetrators ===
The traveling companions of the murdered scouts had supposed that the perpetrators had been Native Americans, due to both the sighting of Indians possibly wearing some of the scouts' clothing and the arrows left behind at the scene. This interpretation of events has been called into question, as the native Washoe people did not bury the dead, nor, according to their descendants, would they have taken a dead person's property.

== Monuments and park ==
The tree carving/blaze continued to mark the gravesite for decades and in 1923, as part of an effort to protect it from the elements, the Native Sons of the Golden West placed a rectangular plate of glass over the inscription. After the installation, concerned citizens noted that the glass actually caused moisture to accumulate and would decay the carving. During a storm in late 1929, the tree was broken, just above the inscription. Knowing the stump would now quickly rot, the decision was made to cut out the carving and place it in the museum at Sutter's Fort, where it could be preserved. Under the direction of the Native Sons and Daughters of the Golden West a plaque was created and embedded on a nearby boulder prior to removing the historic carving. The plaque's design includes a facsimile of the carving, and was dedicated on August 30, 1931. After being cut from the tree, the carving was kept at Sutter's Fort until the 1960s, when it was moved to the museum at Marshall Gold Discovery State Historic Park.

In 1967, the Daughters of Utah Pioneers' (DUP) local group in Sacramento County, in cooperation with Eldorado National Forest, developed a picnic park at the site. Paths and three picnic areas were graded with the assistance of local scouts, and the Sons of Utah Pioneers built a water fountain near the spring. Dedication ceremonies for the park were held on September 2, 1967, with Clark Cox, a third great-nephew of Henderson Cox, cutting the ribbon. A DUP marker at the park's entrance was also unveiled during the ceremonies by two great-grandnieces of Daniel Browett. As part of the park's development, another marker, containing the names of the victims with birth and death dates, was placed on one of the grave's large stones.

The grave cairn was damaged in spring 2021, when high winds caused a neighboring tree to topple. The cairn was repaired, but soon after, the Caldor Fire burned through the area. The fire destroyed many of the trees surrounding the spring along with the picnic spots and interpretive signage. The privately owned Tragedy Spring cistern was also damaged in the fire. As of 2025, the US Forest Service is working with a number of historical societies to restore and improve the site following the fire.

== Climate ==
Climate data for Tragedy Spring, California
Month	Jan	Feb	Mar	Apr	May	Jun	Jul	Aug	Sep	Oct	Nov	Dec	Year
Mean daily maximum °F (°C)	38.7 (3.7)	39.0 (3.9)	42.4 (5.8)	46.0 (7.8)	54.3 (12.4)	64.0 (17.8)	72.0 (22.2)	71.9 (22.2)	66.9 (19.4)	56.9 (13.8)	45.5 (7.5)	37.7 (3.2)	52.9 (11.6)
Mean daily minimum °F (°C)	18.3 (−7.6)	17.9 (−7.8)	20.4 (−6.4)	23.5 (−4.7)	30.7 (−0.7)	38.0 (3.3)	42.7 (5.9)	42.4 (5.8)	38.8 (3.8)	30.9 (−0.6)	23.4 (−4.8)	17.9 (−7.8)	28.7 (−1.8)
Average precipitation inches (mm)	12.57 (319)	13.78 (350)	13.17 (335)	6.24 (158)	5.10 (130)	1.28 (33)	0.35 (8.9)	0.45 (11)	1.00 (25)	4.50 (114)	7.28 (185)	13.69 (348)	79.41 (2,016.9)
Average snowfall inches (cm)	76.5 (194)	78.7 (200)	76.8 (195)	30.4 (77)	10.0 (25)	2.0 (5.1)	0.0 (0.0)	0.1 (0.25)	1.4 (3.6)	10.8 (27)	37.4 (95)	69.2 (176)	393.3 (997.95)
Source: PRISM

== Bibliography ==
- Davies, J. Kenneth; Hansen, Lorin K. (2010). Mormon Gold: Mormons in the California Gold Rush, Contributing to the Development of California and the Monetary Solvency of Early Utah (Second ed.). North Salt Lake, Utah: Granite Mountain Publishing Company. ISBN 978-0-9830832-0-7.
- Ricketts, Norma Baldwin (1983), Tragedy Spring and the Pouch of Gold, Sacramento: Ricketts Publishing Company
- Ricketts, Norma Baldwin (1996), The Mormon Battalion: U.S. Army of the West, 1846–1848, Logan, Utah: Utah State University, ISBN 0-87421-216-2
- Tortorich, Frank (Fall 2021). "Tragedy Spring and the Opening of the Gold Rush Trail". Overland Journal. 39 (3). Oregon-California Trails Association: 92–109.
