= California Historical Landmarks in Alpine County =

This list includes properties and districts listed on the California Historical Landmark listing in Alpine County, California. Click the "Map of all coordinates" link to the right to view a Google map of all properties and districts with latitude and longitude coordinates in the table below.

Image		Landmark name	Location	City or town	Summary
Ebbetts Pass Route	318	Ebbetts Pass Route	Ebbetts Pass; 38°32′40″N 119°48′43″W		
Kit Carson Marker	315	Kit Carson Marker	Carson Pass; 38°41′38″N 119°59′15″W	Carson Pass, California	Bronze representation of a tree trunk with "Carson 1844" inscribed on it, placed at Carson Pass in the Sierra Nevada, in the Eldorado National Forest and Alpine County, eastern California.
Upload Photo	240	Marklee's Cabin Site	Alpine County Courthouse; 38°41′41″N 119°46′48″W	Markleeville	
Old Emigrant Road	661	Old Emigrant Road	Caples Lake; 38°42′11″N 120°02′11″W	Kirkwood	
Memorial to Pioneer Odd Fellows	378	Memorial to Pioneer Odd Fellows	38°41′32″N 119°59′15″W	Kirkwood	
Pony Express Remount Station at Woodfords	805	Pony Express Remount Station at Woodfords	On Hwy 89, 0.1 mi N of intersection of State Hwy 4 and Old Pony Express Rd. 38°46′35″N 119°49′22″W	Woodfords	

== See also ==
- List of California Historical Landmarks
- National Register of Historic Places listings in Alpine County, California
