= Silver Fork American River =

River in California, United States

Coordinates: 38°46′03″N 120°18′57″W

Silver Fork American River is a tributary of the South Fork American River in the Sierra Nevada near Lake Tahoe in Northern California.

It begins in Amador County above Silver Lake near Kit Carson, just west of Kirkwood Mountain Resort, at an elevation of almost 8,000 feet. After exiting Silver Lake near Carson Pass Highway, Silver Fork American River flows west through El Dorado County in the Eldorado National Forest for almost four miles where it receives its main tributary, Caples Creek. For the remaining 8.5 miles, it flows northwest paralleling Silver Fork Road passing numerous campgrounds such as Caples Creek, Silver Fork, Silver Fork Ranch, Gray Rock, and China Flat. It finally joins the South Fork American River just west of the town of Kyburz.
