= List of killings by law enforcement officers in the United States, August 2018 =

This is a list of people reported killed by non-military law enforcement officers in the United States in August 2018, whether in the line of duty or not, and regardless of reason or method. The listing documents the occurrence of a death, making no implications regarding wrongdoing or justification on the part of the person killed or officer involved. Killings are arranged by date of the incident that caused death. Different death dates, if known, are noted in the description. The table below lists 17 people.

== August 2018 ==
Date	Name (and age) of deceased	State (city)	Description
2018-08-31	Paul Askins (61)	Colorado (Sedalia)	Two deputies pulled over a truck near Sedalia for making an illegal turn. The truck had four occupants, two men and two women. The deputies discovered that one of the female passengers was an individual listed on a protection order against the man matching the description of one of the male passengers. Three of the passengers cooperated with the police's orders to exit the truck and provide IDs, but the fourth passenger, the same who had the order against him, refused to cooperate and neither got out of the vehicle or provided and ID. Eventually the passenger opened the door and pointed a pistol at one of the deputies, who responded by opening fire, killing him. The deceased man was later identified as Paul Askins of Colorado Springs, who had two warrants for his arrest.
2018-08-30	Vanessa Marquez (49)	California (South Pasadena)	Marquez, an actress best known for the TV show "ER" and film "Stand and Deliver," was reported by her landlord as possibly needing mental health service. When police arrived for a welfare check, Marquez pointed a handgun-style BB gun at them, and they shot her.
2018-08-23	Donna Castleberry	Ohio (Columbus)	Castleberry was killed by an undercover cop in an alleged prostitution sting. The officer was indicted, and Castleberry's family received a $1 million wrongful death settlement, the largest payout in city history.
2018-08-20	Jeffrey Dennis (36)	Pennsylvania (Philadelphia)	Dennis was stopped by six plainclothes officers who were in the area to execute a search warrant of a home connected to Dennis. He was shot and killed by an undercover officer after ramming his car into another officer.
2018-08-13	Mario Hobson (48)	Wisconsin (Milwaukee)	Officers tried to arrest Hobson, who had two warrants for his arrest, but he fled in his car knocking one of the officers down. Moments later officers stopped a similar-looking car. At first it did not appear that Hobson as in the car, but officers found him crouching in a back seat. As Hobson pulled out a gun the officers fired a total of six shots, killing him.
2018-08-12	Anthony Vargas (21)	California (Montebello)	Vargas was shot 13 times in the back (while unarmed), by on duty LASD officers as part of an initiation into a gang, possibly the 'Compton Executioners'. He then allegedly had a gun planted on him by those Officers. No arrests have been made.
2018-08-07	Michael Eugene Ducote (26)	Louisiana (Shreveport)	Ducote stole a vehicle and led police on a pursuit that ended when he crashed. Ducote allegedly reversed his vehicle into a patrol car, causing officers to fatally shoot him. A 38-year-old accomplice was arrested after he bailed out of the car.
2018-08-05	Leng, Wangshen (66)	Washington (Issaquah)	Police responding to a domestic violence call restrained Leng and handcuffed him on a couch. Leng's neck and cervical spine were broken, and he died on September 9. His death was ruled a homicide.
2018-08-05	Bishop, James (29)	New Mexico (Las Cruces)	Officers responded when the man's parents called because he was having a psychotic episode and threatened his mother. The police attempted to talk to James, but he attacked one officer with a baseball bat and was shot in head and killed.
2018-08-04	Robert Louis Mayo (71)	Maryland (Windsor Mills)	Mayo, a pedestrian, was struck and killed by a Baltimore County Police Department vehicle responding to an assault call.
2018-08-04	Mary Wheat (42)	California (Martell)	An off-duty California Highway Patrol officer shot his wife and a store owner before shooting himself. The store owner survived.
2018-08-03	Emmanuel Alquisiras (29)	Florida (Seville)	An officer responded to a domestic violence call and confronted Alquisiras and his friend on their house. The two were uncooperative. After Alquisiras's girlfriend came out of the house, he started pushing her, and the officer responded by tasering him. After continuing to refuse to comply to the officer's commands to put his hands behind his back, Alquisiras grabbed the officer's taser, to which the officer responded by shooting 5 rounds, 4 of which struck Alquisiras in the torso. Alquisiras was pronounced dead on arrival to hospital, and the whole incident was recorded by the officers body cam.
2018-08-01	Jonathan Joey Mendoza (35)	Texas (Hereford)	Officers from multiple jurisdictions went to arrest Mendoza on multiple warrants. Mendoza ran out of the back of the home with a gun, saw police, then ran around to the front of the house, where Amarillo SWAT officers then shot him.
2018-08-01	Tramaine Marquese Poole (41)	Virginia (Sussex County)	Poole was a suspect in a New Haven murder case and died after a shootout with police on the highway in Sussex County. A police drug dog was also shot and killed by stray fire from Poole during the shootout.
2018-08-01	David Hall (27)	Maryland (Oxon Hill)	Hall entered a liquor store and shot and killed a customer. As he left, an on-duty plainclothes police officer at a nearby intersection tried to stop him. Hall pointed his gun at the officer, and the officer killed him.
2018-08-01	David Judge (53)	Arizona (Tucson)	Judge had been firing guns inside his home, and police were called out. After several hours of negotiation, Judge came out of the home pointing two handguns, and police shot him.
2018-08-01	Jacob Bauer (38)	California (Pleasanton)	Police responded to a report of a man smashing things in a supermarket and its parking lot. They found and arrested Bauer, including using something police referred to as an "electronic control device," probably a stun gun. Bauer stopped breathing, and was pronounced dead at a hospital.

== See also ==
- Death in custody § United States
- Henry A. Wallace Police Crime Public Database
- List of cases of police brutality
- List of countries with annual rates and counts for killings by law enforcement officers
- List of law enforcement officers killed in the line of duty in the United States
- List of law enforcement officers convicted for an on-duty killing in the United States
- List of police reforms related to the George Floyd protests
- List of unarmed African Americans killed by law enforcement officers in the United States
- Lists of killings by law enforcement officers
- Police brutality in the United States
- Police misconduct § United States
- Police riot § United States
- Police use of deadly force in the United States
