= California State Route 104 =

Highway in California

State Route 104
- SR 104 highlighted in red

Route information
- Maintained by Caltrans
- Length: 36.04 mi (58.00 km)

Major junctions
- West end: SR 99 near Galt
- SR 124 at Ione; SR 88 from near Sunnybrook to near Martell
- East end: SR 49 in Sutter Creek

Location
- Country: United States
- State: California
- Counties: Sacramento, Amador

Highway system
- State highways in California; Interstate; US; State; Scenic; History; Pre‑1964; Unconstructed; Deleted; Freeways
← SR 103	→ I-105

State Route 104 (SR 104) is a west–east state highway in the U.S. state of California that runs from the Central Valley to the Sierra Foothills. It connects State Route 99 near Galt to State Route 49 in Sutter Creek via the city of Ione. It is known as Twin Cities Road from its western terminus up until just before Ione. West of the SR 104/SR 99 interchange, Twin Cities Road continues to Interstate 5 and then eventually end at State Route 160 north of Walnut Grove.

== Route description ==
Route 104 is defined in section 404 of the California Streets and Highways Code:

Route 104 is from:
(a) Route 99 near Arno to Route 88 near Ione.
(b) Route 88 west of Martell to Route 88 southwest of Pine Grove via the vicinity of Sutter Creek.

The definition omits the concurrency with Route 88 instead of duplicating that segment in the other route's definition in the code. Furthermore, the highway is not fully constructed to extend further east to near Pine Grove as defined.

SR 104 begins in Galt in Sacramento County at SR 99. It then heads eastward, forming the northern boundary of the city of Galt. The route turns northeast, passing through Herald, near Rancho Seco Nuclear Generating Station and on to the community of Clay before entering Amador County. It then continues past Mule Creek State Prison and begins a short overlap with SR 124 in Ione. Afterwards, it exits the town and has another overlap with SR 88, where it goes through the community of Sunnybrook. Its eastern terminus is at SR 49 in Sutter Creek.

SR 104 is not part of the National Highway System, a network of highways that are considered essential to the country's economy, defense, and mobility by the Federal Highway Administration.

== History ==
The route formerly extended to West Point, but the segment between SR 88 and West Point was transferred to SR 26 in 1984. According to the California Streets and Highways Code, SR 104 is an unfinished route as the highway's legislative designation extends past SR 49 east to SR 88. Ridge Road makes this exact connection, but it is not currently owned or maintained by Caltrans.

== Major intersections ==
Except where prefixed with a letter, postmiles were measured on the road as it was in 1964, based on the alignment that existed at the time, and do not necessarily reflect current mileage. Postmile prefixes include: R reflecting a realignment in the route since then, M indicating a second realignment, L referring to an overlap due to a correction or change, and T indicating postmiles classified as temporary. Segments that remain unconstructed or have been relinquished to local control may be omitted. The numbers reset at county lines; the start and end postmiles in each county are given in the county column.

County	Location	Postmile	Destinations	Notes
Sacramento; SAC 0.00-17.69	Galt	0.00	CR E13 (Twin Cities Road) – Walnut Grove	Continuation beyond SR 99
Sacramento; SAC 0.00-17.69	Galt	0.00	SR 99 – Sacramento, Fresno	Interchange; west end of SR 104; SR 99 exit 277
Amador; AMA 0.00-10.07	Ione	R5.77	SR 124 north (Plymouth Highway) / Shakeley Lane – Plymouth, Placerville	West end of SR 124 overlap
Amador; AMA 0.00-10.07	Ione	R5.96	SR 124 south (Church Street) – Stockton	East end of SR 124 overlap
Amador; AMA 0.00-10.07		8.20 7.39 (Note: Indicates that the postmile represents the distance along SR 88 rather than SR 104.)	SR 88 west / Jackson Valley Road – Stockton	West end of SR 88 overlap
Amador; AMA 0.00-10.07		12.68 8.39	SR 88 east – Martell, Jackson	East end of SR 88 overlap
Amador; AMA 0.00-10.07	Sutter Creek	10.07	SR 49 – Sutter Creek, Jackson	East end of SR 104; serves Jackson Rancheria
Amador; AMA 0.00-10.07	Sutter Creek	10.07	Ridge Road	Continuation beyond SR 49
1.000 mi = 1.609 km; 1.000 km = 0.621 mi: Concurrency terminus
