= National Register of Historic Places listings in Alpine County, California =

Location of Alpine County in California

This is a list of the National Register of Historic Places listings in Alpine County, California.

This is intended to be a complete list of the properties and districts on the National Register of Historic Places in Alpine County, California, United States. Latitude and longitude coordinates are provided for many National Register properties and districts; these locations may be seen together in a Google map.

There are 2 properties and districts listed on the National Register in the county.

This National Park Service list is complete through NPS recent listings posted September 4, 2026.

== Current listings ==
	Name on the Register	Image	Date listed	Location	City or town	Description
1	Alpine County Courthouse	Alpine County Courthouse	September 30, 2004 (#04001074)	14777 CA 89; 38°41′40″N 119°46′43″W	Markleeville	
2	Old Webster Schoolhouse	Old Webster Schoolhouse	July 11, 2005 (#05000071)	135 School St. 38°41′40″N 119°46′56″W	Markleeville	

== See also ==
- List of National Historic Landmarks in California
- National Register of Historic Places listings in California
- California Historical Landmarks in Alpine County, California
