= Memorial to Pioneer Odd Fellows =

- Location: State Route 88, 14.5 miles (23.3 km) west of Woodfords, California
- Coordinates: 38.69215°N 119.987517°W

California Historical Landmark
- Reference no.: 378

The Memorial to Pioneer Odd Fellows is a California Historical Landmark located in Alpine County, California, near Carson Pass. A group of gold seeking Odd Fellows, in 1849, painted their names and the symbol of the Independent Order of Odd Fellows on a group of granite boulders. In May 1941, a marker was placed at the site reading:

Pioneers of California
Pioneers of the Brotherhood of Man
We Salute You. Your bodies have blended with the dust of the West. Your spirit lives and inspires.
Dedicated to their memory, by the Grand Lodge of California Independent Order of Odd Fellows,
May 1941
