= Carson Pass =

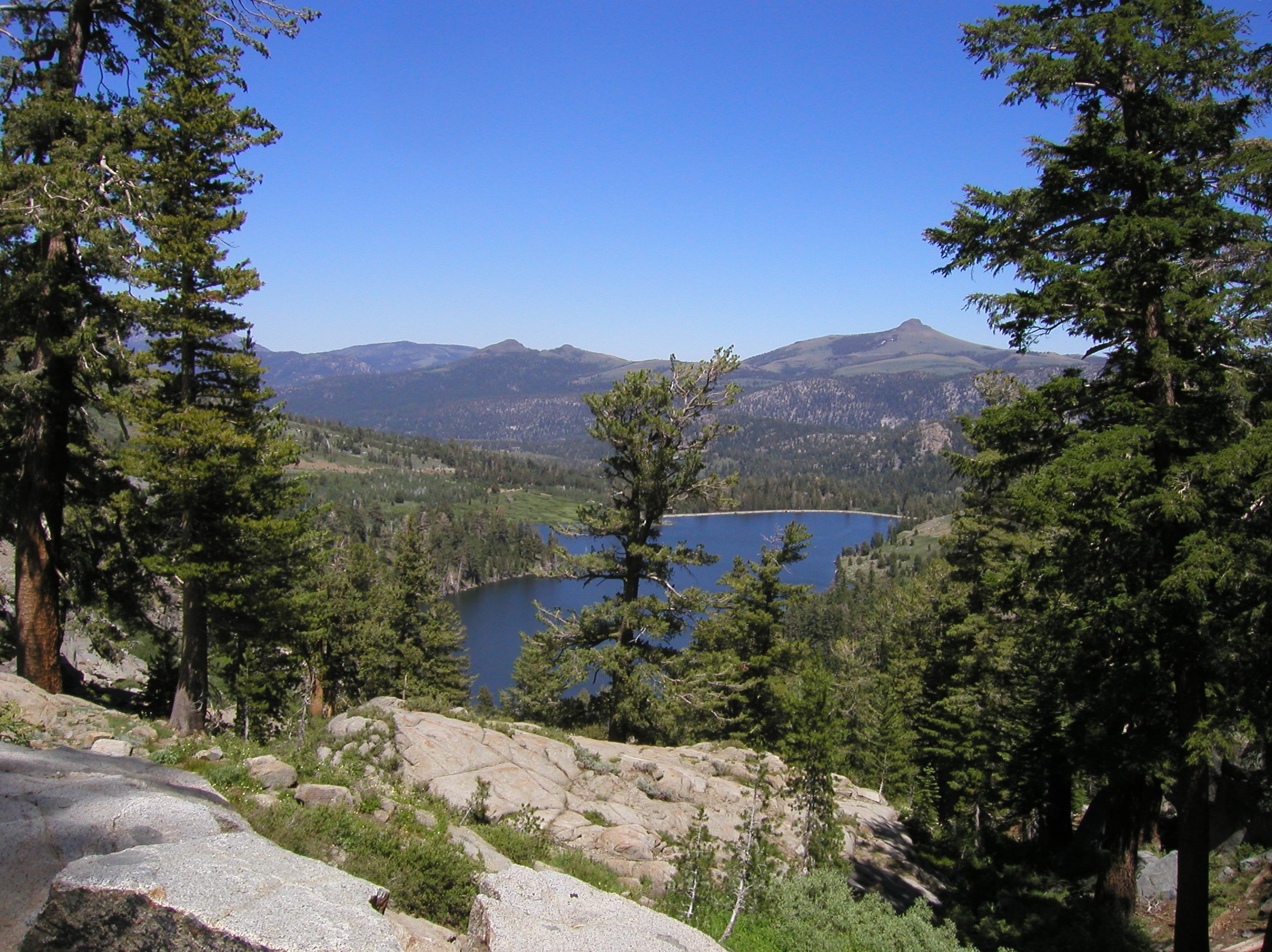
- The Carson Pass (foreground) overlooks Red Lake to the east.

- Location within California
- Elevation: 8,574 ft (2,613 m)
- Traversed by: SR 88

Third Approach
- Location: Sierra Crest, Eldorado National Forest, Alpine County, California, United States
- Range: Sierra Nevada
- Coordinates: 38°41′38″N 119°59′15″W

California Historical Landmark
- Official name: Kit Carson Marker
- Reference no.: 315

Carson Pass is a mountain pass on the crest of the central Sierra Nevada, in the Eldorado National Forest and Alpine County, eastern California.

The pass is traversed by California State Route 88. It lies on the Great Basin Divide, with the West Fork Carson River on the east and the South Fork American River on the west.

The historic pass was a point on the Carson Trail during the California Gold Rush and was used for American Civil War shipping to California until the completion of the First transcontinental railroad. The Pacific Crest Trail traverses the Carson Pass summit, which has California Historical Landmark #315 at CA 88 postmile 6.09 where Kit Carson carved his name into a tree.

== History ==
The 1844 Frémont Expedition turned south from northern Nevada. When encamped at Nevada's Carson Valley on January 31, 1844, Frémont decided to detour west during the winter conditions to Sutter's Fort in California for supplies. Local Washoe Indians told them of a route through the mountains, but warned them not to proceed through the snow. Frémont ignored the advice and directed the group westward. The Washoe were right in that they were not able to find food or game, and they ended up resorting to eating dogs, horses, and mules just to survive. On February 14, Frémont and his cartographer Charles Preuss made it up Red Lake Peak and became the first recorded white men to see Lake Tahoe in the distance. On February 21, the expedition made it through the now-named Carson pass west of Red Lake and arrived at Sutter's Fort on March 6 with no fatalities.

In the summer of 1848, Mormons leaving California for Utah built what would become known as the Carson Trail across the Sierra from Sly Park, California, to the Carson Valley via Carson Pass. The Carson Trail became one of the primary routes across the Sierra used by overland immigrants to California in the Gold Rush era. Brigham Young evacuated Mormon settlers around Carson Pass in July 1857, shortly after the breakout of the Utah War.

== Maiden's Grave ==
Maiden's Grave
- Interactive map of Maiden's Grave
- 38.6318°N 120.171233°W
- Location: State Highway 88, Kirkwood, California

California Historical Landmark
- Reference no.: 28

In 1850, the young Rachel Melton was buried west of Carson's Pass. Her family was traveling from Iowa when she became ill. The family camped out with a goal to improve Rachel's health, but she died. The site is a California Historical Landmark.

== Climate ==
According to the Köppen Climate Classification system, Carson Pass has a dry-summer subarctic climate, abbreviated "Dsc" on climate maps.

Climate data for Carson Pass, California, 2006–2020 normals, extremes 2004–present
Month	Jan	Feb	Mar	Apr	May	Jun	Jul	Aug	Sep	Oct	Nov	Dec	Year
Record high °F (°C)	61 (16)	60 (16)	64 (18)	68 (20)	71 (22)	79 (26)	81 (27)	82 (28)	82 (28)	72 (22)	65 (18)	60 (16)	82 (28)
Mean maximum °F (°C)	52.1 (11.2)	52.9 (11.6)	56.0 (13.3)	61.5 (16.4)	66.0 (18.9)	73.4 (23.0)	77.0 (25.0)	76.3 (24.6)	74.0 (23.3)	66.6 (19.2)	59.5 (15.3)	51.4 (10.8)	78.1 (25.6)
Mean daily maximum °F (°C)	38.7 (3.7)	39.0 (3.9)	41.8 (5.4)	46.9 (8.3)	52.7 (11.5)	62.1 (16.7)	69.8 (21.0)	69.0 (20.6)	64.7 (18.2)	53.5 (11.9)	44.4 (6.9)	36.9 (2.7)	51.6 (10.9)
Daily mean °F (°C)	30.3 (−0.9)	29.8 (−1.2)	32.2 (0.1)	36.7 (2.6)	42.7 (5.9)	51.2 (10.7)	58.6 (14.8)	58.1 (14.5)	53.1 (11.7)	43.8 (6.6)	35.8 (2.1)	28.8 (−1.8)	41.8 (5.4)
Mean daily minimum °F (°C)	22.0 (−5.6)	20.6 (−6.3)	22.6 (−5.2)	26.4 (−3.1)	32.8 (0.4)	40.3 (4.6)	47.4 (8.6)	47.0 (8.3)	42.5 (5.8)	34.1 (1.2)	27.2 (−2.7)	20.8 (−6.2)	32.0 (0.0)
Mean minimum °F (°C)	5.5 (−14.7)	3.5 (−15.8)	8.2 (−13.2)	12.0 (−11.1)	22.2 (−5.4)	29.1 (−1.6)	40.3 (4.6)	38.3 (3.5)	30.7 (−0.7)	21.3 (−5.9)	11.5 (−11.4)	3.7 (−15.7)	−1.4 (−18.6)
Record low °F (°C)	−5 (−21)	−4 (−20)	−3 (−19)	2 (−17)	10 (−12)	19 (−7)	34 (1)	30 (−1)	23 (−5)	13 (−11)	−2 (−19)	−4 (−20)	−5 (−21)
Average precipitation inches (mm)	6.41 (163)	6.64 (169)	6.91 (176)	3.55 (90)	2.13 (54)	0.59 (15)	0.39 (9.9)	0.47 (12)	0.67 (17)	3.07 (78)	4.13 (105)	5.57 (141)	40.53 (1,029.9)
Average extreme snow depth inches (cm)	62.1 (158)	81.1 (206)	97.0 (246)	81.8 (208)	53.1 (135)	18.1 (46)	0.9 (2.3)	0.0 (0.0)	0.5 (1.3)	3.1 (7.9)	19.0 (48)	40.2 (102)	102.4 (260)
Average precipitation days (≥ 0.01 in)	9.7	8.8	11.2	8.3	6.1	2.1	1.7	1.7	2.9	5.5	8.1	10.1	76.2
Source: XMACIS2

== See also ==
- California Historical Landmarks in Alpine County
