= Cooks Station =

Roadside stop on State Route 88 in the Sierra Nevada mountains

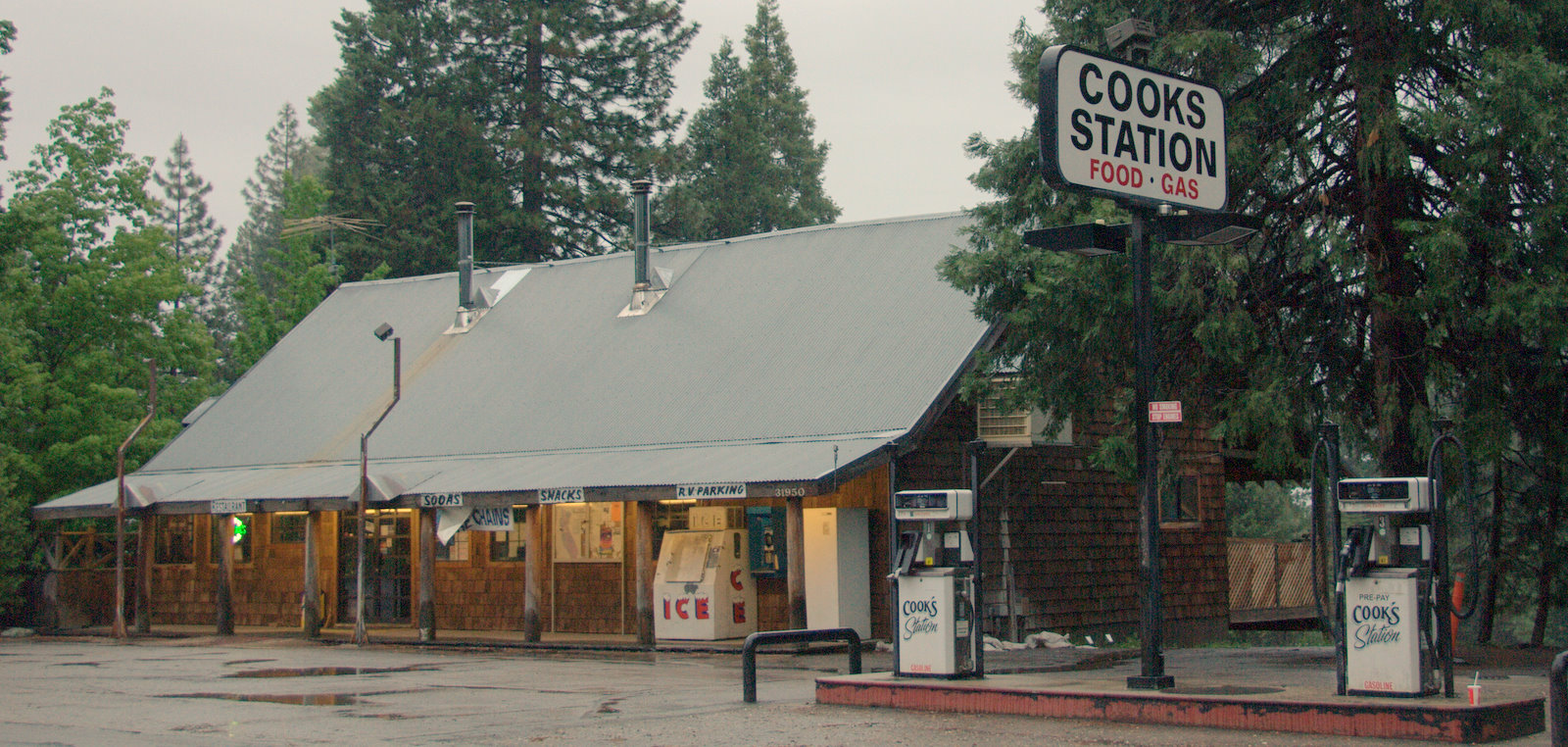
Cooks station in 2008

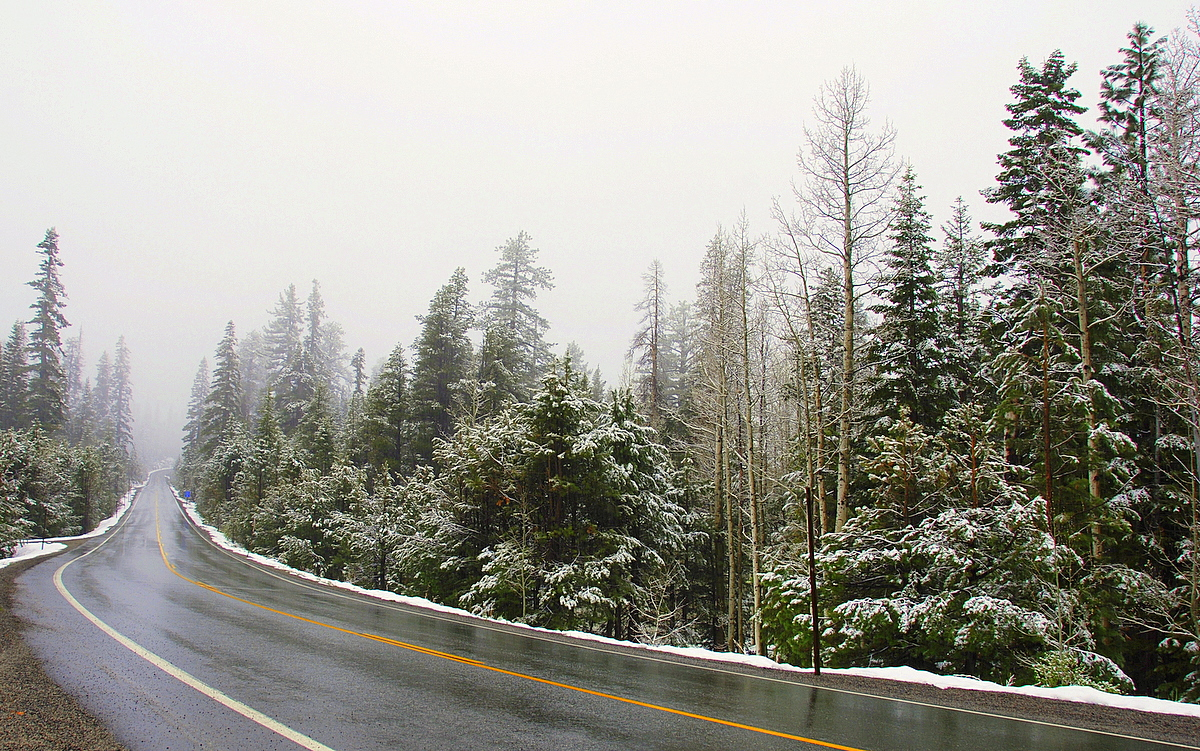
California State Route 88; snowstorm on 26 May 2008

Cooks or Cook's Station, elevation 5,000 feet (1,500 m), is a roadside stop on State Route 88 in Amador County in the Sierra Nevada mountains.

Built in 1863 as part of the Volcano cutoff of the Carson Emigrant Trail, Cooks Station is one of two remaining "stations" on the highway among many that sprang up after the road was completed over the Carson Pass in the 1860s. The other remaining station is Ham's Station, located 3.3 miles (5.3 km) east at 6,000 feet (1,800 m) elevation.

Both stations are routinely used by the California Department of Transportation (CALTRANS) to indicate points where snow chains are required for continued travel during snowstorms. Current conditions and requirements are posted at the CALTRANS road information website.
