= Amador Central Railroad =

Defunct railroad in California, United States

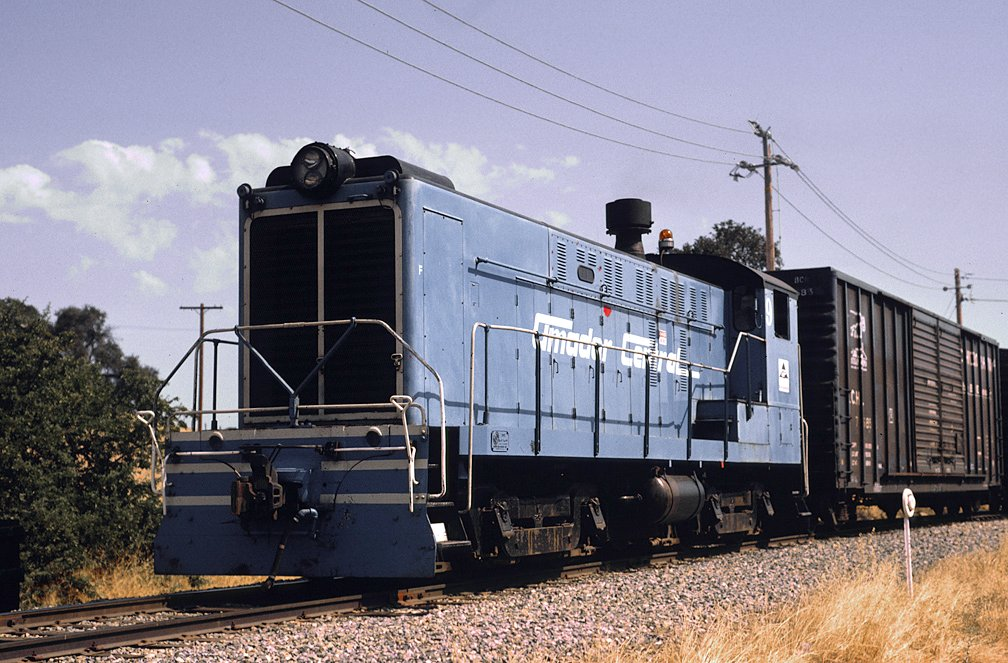
- Amador Central Railroad locomotive #9 leaving Martell for the Southern Pacific connection at Ione. The AMC was noted for its use of a pair of elderly Baldwin S-12 locomotives.

Overview
- Headquarters: Martell, California
- Reporting mark: AMC
- Locale: Ione - Martell, California
- Dates of operation: 1902–2004
- Predecessor: Ione and Eastern Railroad
- Successor: Amador Foothills Railroad

Technical
- Track gauge: 4 ft 8 1/2 in (1,435 mm) standard gauge

The Amador Central Railroad (reporting mark AMC) was a standard gauge railroad that operated 11.8 miles (19.0 km) between a connection with the Southern Pacific Company (SP) at Ione and Martell near the town of Jackson, California. The carrier served the Sierra Nevada Foothills gold mining communities and hauled lumber products from the El Dorado National Forest. Amador is the name of the county in which the railroad operated.

== History ==
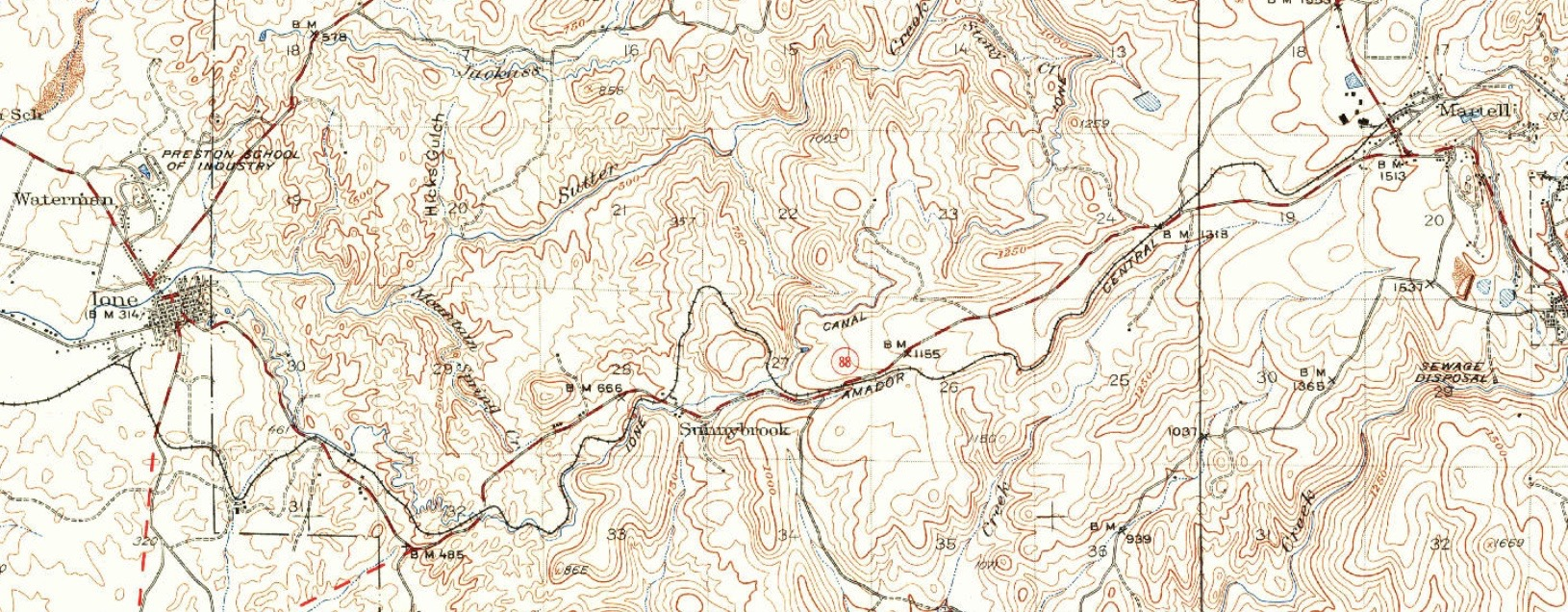
Amador Central Railroad route in 1941

The Amador Central traces its history back to the Ione & Eastern Railroad. In 1902, the Ione & Eastern proposed to build a 14-mile (23 km) line from Ione to Sutter Creek and then an additional 13 miles (21 km) to Volcano, California. The Ione & Eastern only completed a line to Sunnybrook. The railroad survived a few short years and filed bankruptcy, then sold in 1904 and renamed as the Amador Central Railroad. The line continued to Martell, CA and the first train pulled into Martell later that same year.

== Timeline ==
- March 5, 1902 Ione & Eastern Railroad incorporated
- April 10, 1902 Grading commences
- June 20, 1902 Laying rails commences
- November 15, 1902 First trains operates to Sunnybrook Milepost 5.0
- May 12, 1903 Ione & Eastern Railroad, filed bankruptcy.
- June 15, 1904 Amador Central was incorporated, and continued track work towards Martell, CA.
- November 22, 1904 First train operates into Martell, CA.
- July 12, 1942 Last Passenger train departs Martell, CA.
- January 1, 1943 AMC leased by Winton Lumber Company
- June 22, 1964 AMC purchased by American Forest Products
- June 1988 AMC acquired by Georgia-Pacific
- March 28, 1997 AMC's owner, Georgia-Pacific sells its Martell operations to Sierra Pacific Industries and last freight train runs.
- August 10, 1997 Georgia Pacific sells AMC to Sierra Railroad, in Oakdale for 1.5 million dollars.
- September 13, 1998 Sierra Railroad Transfers ownership of AMC to Sierra Pacific Industries.
- 1998 Sierra Pacific Industries leases the AMC to Ampine a division of Sierra Pine, Ampine reopens line and renames AMC the Amador Foothills Railroad
- June 7, 2004 Last train on the Amador Foothills Railroad operates.
- November 2011 The Amador Central Railroad was purchased from Sierra Pacific Industries by the Recreational Railroad Coalition Historical Society and the Amador County Historical Society with the intent of saving it for future generations for Historical, educational, and recreational purposes.

The AMC ran from the terminus of SP's Ione Branch at Ione to Martell.

== Legacy ==
As of October, 2009, all track north and east of the Martell grade crossing of California Highway 88 has been taken up (about 1.5 miles), along with most of the ties and ballast. The main depot in Martell is abandoned and being allowed to deteriorate as it awaits demolition. The nearby locomotive shop shed is being used for storage and automotive repair.

Trackage, crossings and warning systems remain in place from Ione to the Martell Hwy 88 grade crossing, 9.5 miles of rail line. The line is leased, maintained and used by a group of rail enthusiasts, who own and operate railcar speeders on this stretch of scenic track.

An industrial / business park has been laid out in the area just northeast of the Hwy 88 crossing, with underground utilities laid and streets paved, but it remains largely undeveloped. The park is named after the railroad and the streets have related names, such as "Locomotive Lane" and "Boxcar Blvd."

October 27, 2010 the Amador Central/Amador Foothills Railroad was officially transferred from Sierra Pacific Industries to both the Amador County Historical Society (ACHS) and Recreational Railroad Coalition Inc. (RRCI) jointly at a ceremony in front of the historic 1877-built Southern Pacific Depot in Ione. The historical society and RRCHS bought the railroad for a stunning one dollar. The groups have met to form a Railroad Management Committee appointing Grant Vogel who was unanimously voted to be the Roadmaster, and Tom Correa will serve as the deputy Roadmaster.

Approved to operate by the FRA as a Noninsular Tourist Railway in 2015, the Railway is operating under the Name "Amador Central Railway". Contact may be made by contacting the Owning Partnership (Amador County Historical Society or the Recreational Railroad Coalition & Historical Society.

Earlier in 2008, the last AMC/AFRR locomotive, #10, was moved down to Ione, CA where it sits today. It is privately owned and is under a storage lease to the city of Ione.
