= Silver Lake (Amador County, California) =

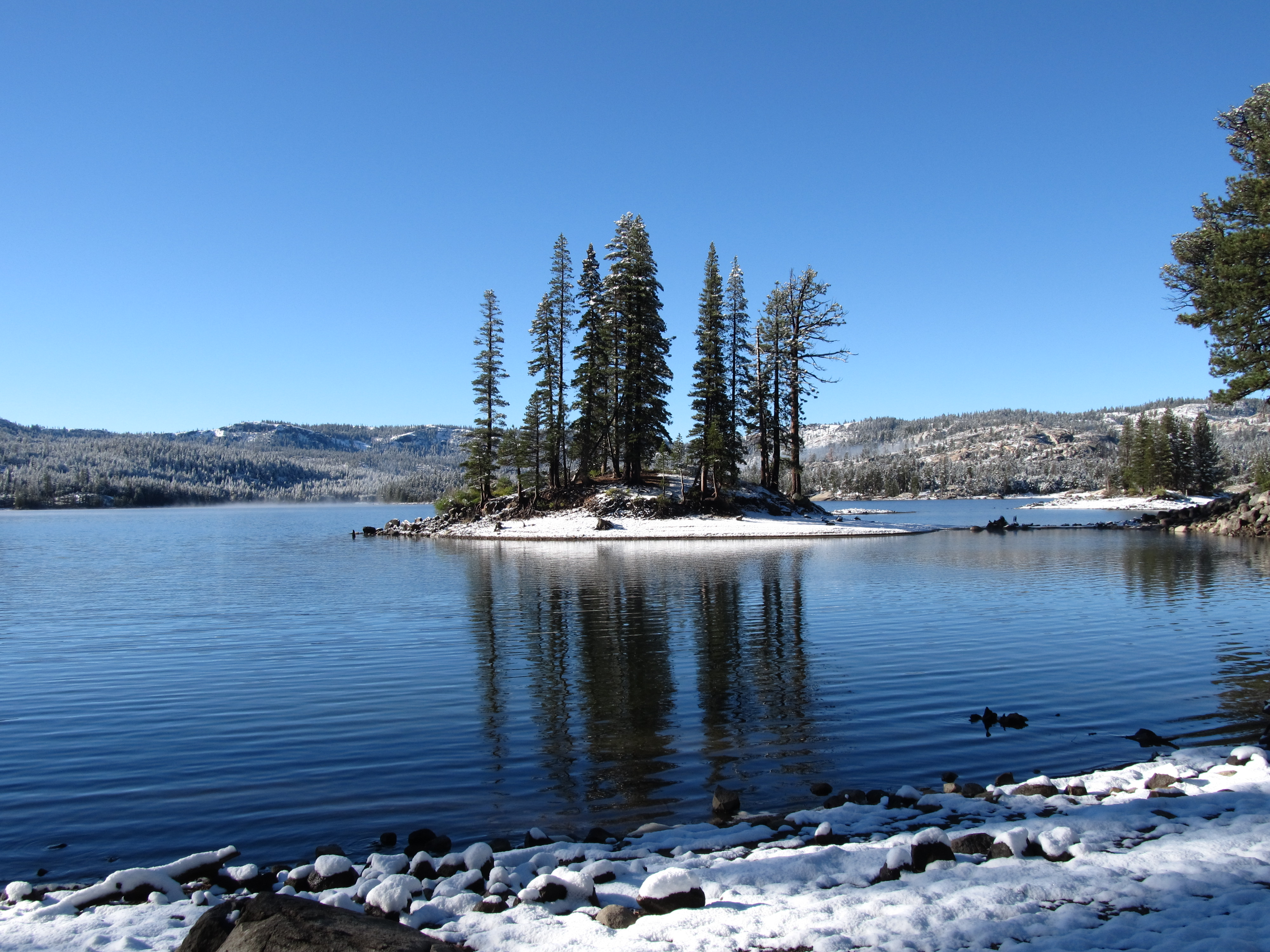

- Location within California Location within the United States
- Location: Northern California
- Coordinates: 38.6587447°N 120.1186238°W
- Type: Reservoir
- Primary inflows: Silver Fork American River South Fork American River Watershed
- Primary outflows: Silver Fork American River
- Basin countries: United States
- Managing agency: El Dorado Irrigation District
- Surface area: 525 acres (212 ha)
- Average depth: 73 ft (22 m)
- Surface elevation: 7,200 feet (2,200 m)
- Islands: Treasure Island and Skull Island

Silver Lake is a reservoir in the Sierra Nevada mountains of California.

It is located within Amador County. It is about 20 mi (32 km) south of South Lake Tahoe and about 8 miles (13 km) west of Carson Pass. The lake surface is 525 acres (212 ha) at full capacity and is at an elevation of 7,200 feet (2,200 m). It is surrounded by Eldorado National Forest and is part of the El Dorado Irrigation District (EID) and their Hydroelectric Project 184 system. Snow and ice are common in this area during winter seasons.

It used to be reachable between 1848 and 1863 by taking Old Emigrant Road, now you can access it off of California Highway 88 or known locally as the "Carson Pass Highway".

In the center of the lake is Treasure Island which is only accessible by boat or swimming.

== Silver Lake West Recreation Area/Campground ==
Silver lake is home to Silver Lake West Campground

This is a first-come-first-served campground with 42 campsites. The campground is open from May until October, weather permitting. All campsites contain one to two vehicle parking, fire rings with grill, bear-resistant food storage lockers, and picnic tables. Some can accommodate small RVs and motor homes. There is no cell coverage at this campground.

Swimming, fishing and recreational boating are available at the lake. There is a small fee to launch boats at the improved ramp. Some watercraft are usually available for rent at the Kit Carson Lodge located at the North end of the lake. The lodge also offers many other individual or group activities such as gold rush tours and horseback riding.

=== Silver Lake Hikes ===
There are many trials located near and around Silver Lake, such as

- Shealor Lake trailhead
- Granite Lake trail
- LakeMargaret trailhead
- Thunder Mountain trailhead
- Meiss Lake trailhead
- Frog Lake trailhead

== Wildlife & Fishing ==
Silver Lake is open year-round for fishing with a 5 trout daily take limit and a 10 in possession bag limit It has been periodically stocked with fish by the California Department of Fish and Wildlife (CDFW) since 1930. Currently there are rainbow trout (Oncorhynchus mykiss),

Local animals including deer, bears, birds, squirrels and other rodents, insects, and mountain lions are found along the hiking trails, rim of the lake, and in the various camp grounds.

== See also ==
- Caples Lake
- South Lake Tahoe
