= Mount Zion Demonstration State Forest =

Public forest in Pine Grove, California, United States

Coordinates: 38.3924120°N 120.6532639°W

Mount Zion Demonstration State Forest is located in the town of Pine Grove, Amador County, California, United States. It features a ranger lookout station and microwave tower atop Mount Zion, which is accessed via Mount Zion Road from California State Route 88.
