= California State Route 124 =

Highway in California

State Route 124

- Map of Amador County in east central California with SR 124 highlighted in red

Route information
- Maintained by Caltrans
- Length: 10.33 mi (16.62 km)

Major junctions
- South end: SR 88 near Ione
- SR 104 at Ione
- North end: SR 16 near Drytown

Location
- Country: United States
- State: California
- Counties: Amador

Highway system
- State highways in California; Interstate; US; State; Scenic; History; Pre‑1964; Unconstructed; Deleted; Freeways
← SR 123	→ SR 125

State Route 124 (SR 124) is a state highway in the U.S. state of California that runs in Amador County from State Route 88 south of Ione to State Route 16 near Waits Station.

== Route description ==
Route 124 is defined in section 424 of the California Streets and Highways Code. The definition omits the concurrency with Route 104 instead of duplicating that segment in the other route's definition in the code:

Route 124 is from:
(a) Route 88 south of Ione to Route 104.
(b) Route 104 to Route 16 near Waits Station.

State Route 124 begins at SR 88 south of the city of Ione. SR 124 continues north as Church Street into the city of Ione, intersecting with Buena Vista Road and passing a lake along the way. Heading northward, SR 124 enters the downtown area of Ione, briefly running concurrently with SR 104 as Main Street before turning northwest as Plymouth Street. In Ione, the route passes a golf club to the west and a reservoir to the north, while heading towards the northeast. SR 124 runs slightly to the northeast as Plymouth Highway, crossing over several creeks, including Mule Creek, and bends slightly towards the east. The highway crosses Horse Creek and Dry Creek, and shortly before re-establishing a northerly route, it passes a mountain known as Rocky Point. SR 124 passes another peak before terminating at SR 16 northwest of Amador City at a T-shaped intersection.

SR 124 is part of the California Freeway and Expressway System, but is not part of the National Highway System, a network of highways that are considered essential to the country's economy, defense, and mobility by the Federal Highway Administration.

== Major intersections ==
Except where prefixed with a letter, postmiles were measured on the road as it was in 1964, based on the alignment that existed at the time, and do not necessarily reflect current mileage. Postmile prefixes include: R reflecting a realignment in the route since then, M indicating a second realignment, L referring to an overlap due to a correction or change, and T indicating postmiles classified as temporary. Segments that remain unconstructed or have been relinquished to local control may be omitted. The entire route is in Amador County.

Location	Postmile	Destinations	Notes
	0.00	SR 88 – Jackson, Clements, Stockton	South end of SR 124
Ione	2.29 R5.96 (Note: Indicates that the postmile represents the distance along SR 104 rather than SR 124.)	SR 104 east (Main Street) – Jackson	South end of SR 104 overlap
Ione	R5.77 R2.29	SR 104 west (Preston Avenue) / Shakeley Lane – Galt, Sacramento	North end of SR 104 overlap
	R10.33	SR 16 to SR 49 – Placerville, Plymouth, Sacramento	North end of SR 124
1.000 mi = 1.609 km; 1.000 km = 0.621 mi: Concurrency terminus
