= Kirkwood Mountain Resort =

Ski area in California, United States

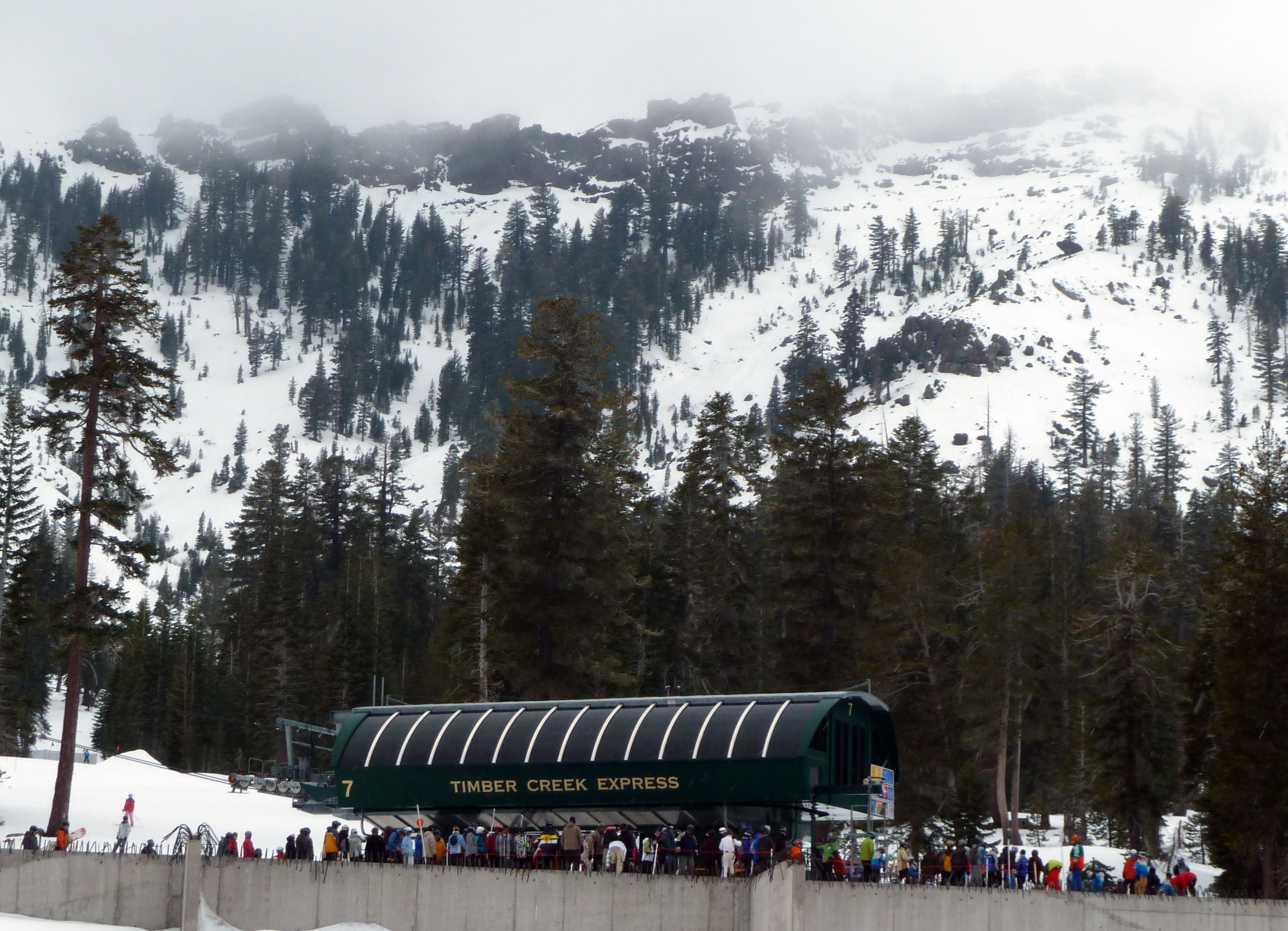
- Kirkwood Mountain Resort in 2012

- Location in California Kirkwood Mountain Resort (the United States)
- Location: Thimble Peak; Covered Wagon Peak; Alpine County, CA; Amador County, CA
- Nearest city: Kirkwood, California
- Coordinates: 38.684°N 120.068°W
- Status: Operating
- Owner: Vail Resorts
- Vertical: 2,000 ft (610 m)
- Top elevation: 9,800 ft (3,000 m)
- Base elevation: 7,800 ft (2,400 m)
- Skiable area: 2,300 acres (930 ha)
- Trails: 65+ total 12% beginner 30% intermediate 58% advanced/expert
- Longest run: 2.5 mi (4.0 km)
- Lift system: 15 lifts (2 high speed quads, 1 fixed-grip quad, 6 triple chairs, 1 double chair, 1 surface lifts, 2 magic carpets)
- Terrain parks: Bandit Park; Outlaw Park
- Snowfall: ~500 in (1,300 cm)
- Snowmaking: Limited acreage
- Night skiing: No
- Website: kirkwood.com

Kirkwood Mountain Resort, owned by Vail Resorts, is a ski resort in Kirkwood, California, south of Lake Tahoe. The resort focuses on skiing and snowboarding in the winter and hiking and mountain-biking in the summer.

Located approximately 33 mi (53 km) south of South Lake Tahoe, California, Kirkwood is accessible via State Route 88 and is nestled within the Eldorado National Forest. While most of the region's resorts are situated at the northern end of the lake, near Truckee, California, Kirkwood, Sierra-at-Tahoe and Heavenly Mountain Resort are found on the southern side of the lake.

== Skiing and snowboarding ==
Kirkwood is a resort with an average of high snowfalls and a selection of advanced skiing terrain. The resort receives seasonal snowfall of 354 in (900 cm), ranking behind only Sugar Bowl Ski Resort in the Sierra Nevada in terms of snow accumulation. Two new surface tows were introduced at Kirkwood during the 2008–2009 season to provide skiers and snowboarders with greater access to terrain along Vista Ridge and Fawn Ridge.

Kirkwood hosted a leg of the North American Freeskiing Championships in 2009 and 2010. This is an event that showcases top freeskiers competing in challenging terrain.

In addition to Alpine skiing, there is a Cross Country Center at the base of the mountain with cross country and snowshoe access to 15 km of trails in the meadow, as well as additional trails in Caples Creek and Schneider.

== The Mountain ==
Kirkwood resort includes 2,300 acres of terrain and over 2,000 feet of vertical. It is distinguished by ample off piste skiing opportunities and runs biased towards more intermediate and advanced skiers, with only 12% beginner terrain. The resort comprises 5 peaks: Covered Wagon Peak (9,545 ft), Thimble Peak (9,805 ft), The Sisters Peak (9,400 ft), Glove Rock (9,360 ft) and Martin Point (9,249 ft).

The main lodge is Mountain Village, with multiple restaurants, accommodations and retail. Lift 6 (Cornice Express) is a high speed detachable lift serving advanced terrain, as well as allowing skiers to traverse to the Timber Creek area through Sentinel Bowl. Lift 10 (The Wall) serves advanced terrain, with several "off-map" chutes accessible from the ridge skiers left of the lift, including Schaffer's, Saddle and Cliff chutes. There are also lifts serving intermediate and beginner's terrain. The backside of the mountain, accessible via Caples Crest features a slow quad Sunrise, as well as Sunrise Grill, a restaurant with limited offerings and outdoor seating.

Timber Creek is the other main lodge on the mountain, with the high speed Timber Creek Express chair serving intermediate terrain as well as allowing skiers to reach Mountain Village. The Ski and Ride School is based out of Timber Creek, as well as a rental facility and a bar and restaurant.

== History ==
Kirkwood opened in 1972 after year-round Caltrans snow plowing service began operations for Highway 88 (CA 88) in 1971. This all-weather highway connects the resort to the populated western regions of California. Kirkwood Mountain Resort is one of the more recent ski resorts to open in the Lake Tahoe region. For most of its history, Kirkwood was off-grid, operating on diesel-powered generators. On New Year's Day, 2010, the generators caught fire, validating a planned move towards linking the resort to the grid. In 2014, the resort energized a 10 megawatt, 28 mile electrical transmission line, resulting in a 2,700 lb NOx emissions reduction.

== Ownership ==
Vail Resorts, Inc. acquired Kirkwood Mountain Resort in April 2012. Prior to 2012, Vail Resorts acquired two other resorts in the Tahoe region: Heavenly Mountain Resort and Northstar California. It accepts the Epic Pass.
