= Pioneer, California =

Pioneer
- Census-designated place
- Location in California
- Coordinates: 38°25′55″N 120°34′19″W
- Country: United States
- State: California
- County: Amador

Area
  - Total: 3.938 sq mi (10.200 km^{2})
  - Land: 3.938 sq mi (10.200 km^{2})
  - Water: 0 sq mi (0 km^{2}) 0%
- Elevation: 2,990 ft (910 m)

Population (2020)
  - Total: 1,066
  - Density: 270.7/sq mi (104.5/km^{2})
- ZIP code: 95666
- Area code: 209
- FIPS code: 06-57330
- GNIS feature IDs: 230751, 2583116

Pioneer is a census-designated place in Amador County, California, United States. It is located 5 miles (8 km) east-northeast of Pine Grove, at an elevation of 2,986 ft (910 m) along State Route 88. The community is served by ZIP code 95666 and area code 209. The population was 1,066 at the 2020 census.

A post office opened in Pioneer in 1947.

== Demographics ==
Historical population
Census	Pop.	Note	%±
2010	1,094		—
2020	1,066		−2.6%
U.S. Decennial Census; 2010

=== 2020 census ===
As of the 2020 census, Pioneer had a population of 1,066. The population density was 270.7 inhabitants per square mile (104.5/km^{2}). The median age was 56.8 years. 14.4% of residents were under the age of 18 and 33.3% were 65 years of age or older. The age distribution was 14.4% under the age of 18, 4.6% aged 18 to 24, 17.4% aged 25 to 44, 30.3% aged 45 to 64, and 33.3% aged 65 or older. For every 100 females, there were 105.0 males, and for every 100 females age 18 and over, there were 101.8 males age 18 and over.

0.0% of residents lived in urban areas, while 100.0% lived in rural areas.

There were 481 households, of which 16.0% had children under the age of 18 living in them. Of all households, 52.8% were married-couple households, 6.4% were cohabiting couple households, 18.9% had a female householder with no spouse or partner present, and 21.8% had a male householder with no spouse or partner present. 27.2% of households were one person, and 16.8% were one person aged 65 or older. The average household size was 2.22. There were 314 families (65.3% of all households).

There were 598 housing units at an average density of 151.9 units per square mile (58.6 units/km^{2}); 481 units (80.4%) were occupied and 117 (19.6%) were vacant. Of occupied units, 89.6% were owner-occupied and 10.4% were renter-occupied. The homeowner vacancy rate was 2.3% and the rental vacancy rate was 5.5%.

Racial composition as of the 2020 census
Race	Number	Percent
White	895	84.0%
Black or African American	3	0.3%
American Indian and Alaska Native	8	0.8%
Asian	5	0.5%
Native Hawaiian and Other Pacific Islander	6	0.6%
Some other race	27	2.5%
Two or more races	122	11.4%
Hispanic or Latino (of any race)	109	10.2%

=== 2010 census ===
Pioneer first appeared as a census designated place in the 2010 U.S. census.

== Points of interest ==
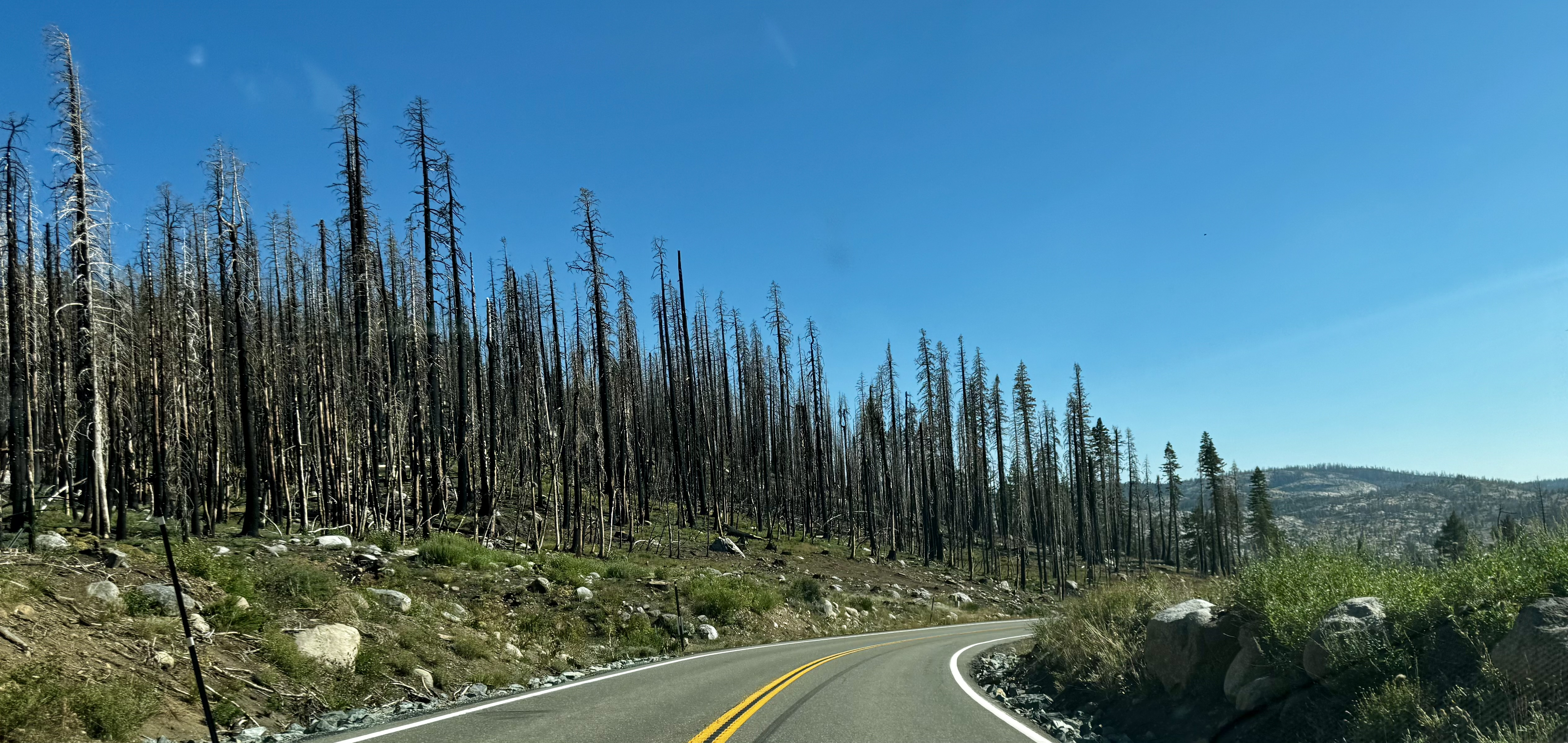
Burned pines outside Pioneer, along Hwy 88

The scenery and environment around Pioneer includes a number of centuries-old tall pine trees and oak trees, as well as lakes for water sports and fishing.

- The Kirkwood Lake Tract
- Mace Meadow Golf Course — golf and restaurant
- Scenic Hwy 88 drive
- Outdoor activities
- Pioneer Park — tennis, basketball, baseball/softball, play structures, community center
- Pioneer Branch Library
- Mollie Joyce Park — baseball, disc golf course
- Tiger Creek — a popular swimming hole that takes advantage of small natural waterfalls and lies behind a PGE hydroelectric power generating plant

== Climate ==
Area has a Köppen Climate Classification of Csb, which is a dry-summer subtropical climate often referred to as "Mediterranean".

Climate data for Pioneer, California
Month	Jan	Feb	Mar	Apr	May	Jun	Jul	Aug	Sep	Oct	Nov	Dec	Year
Mean daily maximum °F (°C)	52 (11)	56 (13)	58 (14)	64 (18)	71 (22)	79 (26)	87 (31)	87 (31)	82 (28)	73 (23)	61 (16)	53 (12)	69 (21)
Mean daily minimum °F (°C)	34 (1)	35 (2)	36 (2)	40 (4)	46 (8)	53 (12)	60 (16)	59 (15)	55 (13)	48 (9)	40 (4)	35 (2)	45 (7)
Average precipitation inches (mm)	8.3 (210)	6.7 (170)	7 (180)	3.9 (99)	2 (51)	0.8 (20)	0.2 (5.1)	0.3 (7.6)	1 (25)	2.5 (64)	6 (150)	6.8 (170)	45.3 (1,150)
Source: Weatherbase

== See also ==
- California State Route 88
