= Kirkwood, California =

Kirkwood
- Unincorporated Community; Census Designated Place
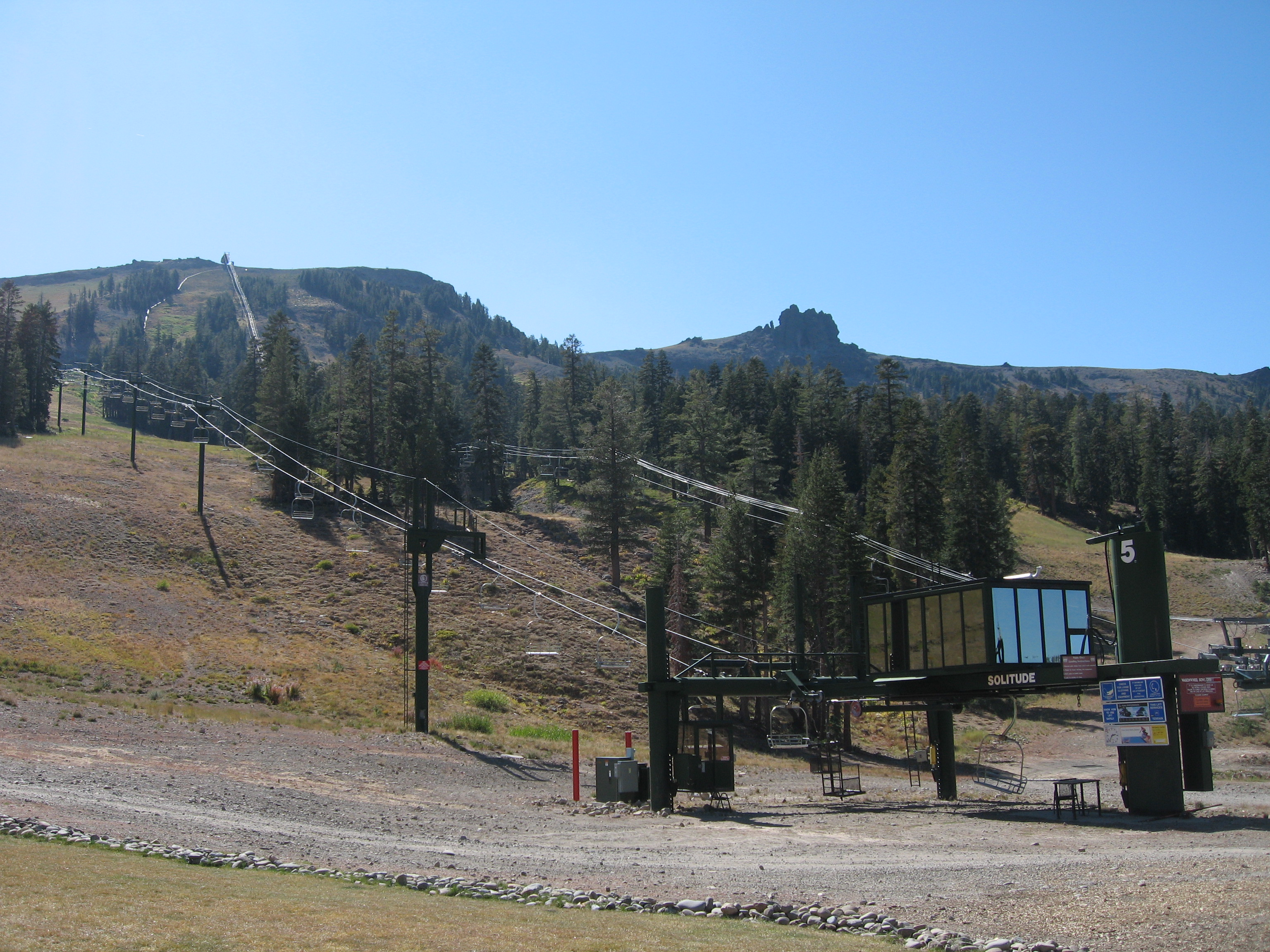
- Kirkwood Mountain Resort

- Location in Alpine County and the state of California

- Location in the United States
- Coordinates: 38°42′10″N 120°04′22″W
- Country: United States
- State: California
- Counties: Alpine & Amador and El Dorado

Government
  - State Senate: Marie Alvarado-Gil (R)
  - State Assembly: Heather Hadwick (R)
  - U. S. Congress: Kevin Kiley (I) and Tom McClintock (R)

Area
  - Total: 5.334 sq mi (13.815 km^{2})
  - Land: 4.359 sq mi (11.290 km^{2})
  - Water: 0.975 sq mi (2.525 km^{2}) 18.28%
- Elevation: 7,690 ft (2,344 m)

Population (2020)
  - Total: 190
  - Density: 44/sq mi (17/km^{2})
- Time zone: UTC-8 (Pacific (PST))
  - Summer (DST): UTC-7 (PDT)
- ZIP code: 95646
- Area code: 209
- FIPS code: 06-38646
- GNIS feature IDs: 262202, 2408489

Kirkwood (formerly Kirk, Kirkwood's, and Roundtop) is an unincorporated community in Alpine and Amador counties, California, United States. Kirkwood's main attraction is the Kirkwood Mountain Resort. The town is accessible by State Route 88. Kirkwood is within the Eldorado National Forest. The population was 190 at the 2020 census. For statistical purposes, the United States Census Bureau has defined Kirkwood as a census-designated place (CDP).

== History ==
Zack Kirkwood, a cattle rancher who had settled in the area, opened an inn, named Kirkwood's, in 1863 with the opening of the Amador/Nevada Wagon Toll Road, the primary route through the Sierra Nevada Mountains. The following year, Alpine County was created and the redrawing of the county borders placed the inn at the convergence of Alpine, El Dorado, and Amador counties (the borders were later changed so that the inn is no longer in El Dorado County, but the original signpost marking the intersection of the three counties is still in the building). Eventually, the inn became a fashionable summer resort.

After Zack's death, the inn stayed in the family and continued to operate until 1966, when it was sold to an investment group, who then converted it into the present-day Kirkwood Mountain Resort.

== Geography ==
According to the United States Census Bureau, the CDP has a total area of 5.3 square miles (14 km^{2}), of which 4.4 square miles (11 km^{2}) is land and 1.0 square mile (2.6 km^{2}) (18.28%) is water.

=== Climate ===
Kirkwood has a dry-summer subarctic climate (Köppen climate classification: Dsc). Summertime is very mild, with little precipitation, while winter is very wet and cold.

Climate data for Caples Lake, California, 1981–2010 normals, extremes 1924–2000
Month	Jan	Feb	Mar	Apr	May	Jun	Jul	Aug	Sep	Oct	Nov	Dec	Year
Record high °F (°C)	64 (18)	66 (19)	70 (21)	78 (26)	82 (28)	92 (33)	95 (35)	91 (33)	88 (31)	83 (28)	72 (22)	70 (21)	95 (35)
Mean maximum °F (°C)	54.0 (12.2)	54.4 (12.4)	57.3 (14.1)	62.0 (16.7)	69.4 (20.8)	76.8 (24.9)	80.2 (26.8)	80.4 (26.9)	77.0 (25.0)	69.9 (21.1)	61.8 (16.6)	55.5 (13.1)	83.4 (28.6)
Mean daily maximum °F (°C)	38.1 (3.4)	39.2 (4.0)	43.0 (6.1)	48.2 (9.0)	56.3 (13.5)	65.7 (18.7)	73.8 (23.2)	72.7 (22.6)	67.1 (19.5)	56.6 (13.7)	43.9 (6.6)	38.4 (3.6)	53.6 (12.0)
Daily mean °F (°C)	28.7 (−1.8)	28.0 (−2.2)	31.2 (−0.4)	35.3 (1.8)	43.2 (6.2)	51.3 (10.7)	58.0 (14.4)	57.3 (14.1)	51.8 (11.0)	42.6 (5.9)	33.8 (1.0)	28.4 (−2.0)	40.8 (4.9)
Mean daily minimum °F (°C)	17.4 (−8.1)	16.4 (−8.7)	18.5 (−7.5)	22.3 (−5.4)	29.0 (−1.7)	37.0 (2.8)	42.3 (5.7)	42.0 (5.6)	36.6 (2.6)	28.6 (−1.9)	21.7 (−5.7)	16.7 (−8.5)	27.4 (−2.6)
Mean minimum °F (°C)	−8.6 (−22.6)	−8.4 (−22.4)	−3.7 (−19.8)	5.7 (−14.6)	17.3 (−8.2)	25.9 (−3.4)	32.2 (0.1)	31.5 (−0.3)	25.4 (−3.7)	14.9 (−9.5)	4.1 (−15.5)	−9.3 (−22.9)	−14.4 (−25.8)
Record low °F (°C)	−26 (−32)	−24 (−31)	−18 (−28)	−14 (−26)	−4 (−20)	7 (−14)	20 (−7)	20 (−7)	10 (−12)	1 (−17)	−9 (−23)	−19 (−28)	−26 (−32)
Average precipitation inches (mm)	7.08 (180)	7.84 (199)	6.32 (161)	3.41 (87)	2.72 (69)	0.97 (25)	0.44 (11)	0.62 (16)	1.16 (29)	2.93 (74)	6.04 (153)	7.48 (190)	47.01 (1,194)
Average snowfall inches (cm)	85.7 (218)	81.8 (208)	79.4 (202)	32.5 (83)	14.0 (36)	1.8 (4.6)	0.0 (0.0)	0.0 (0.0)	2.4 (6.1)	9.2 (23)	30.4 (77)	73.0 (185)	410.2 (1,042.7)
Average precipitation days (≥ 0.01 in)	10.7	9.9	9.7	7.1	7.2	4.5	2.4	2.3	5.2	5.2	9.5	10.1	83.8
Average snowy days (≥ 0.1 day)	10.2	9.0	8.7	5.5	2.4	0.8	0.0	0.0	0.9	2.1	7.5	9.4	56.5
Source 1: NOAA
Source 2: XMACIS2

== Demographics ==
Historical population
Census	Pop.	Note	%±
2000	96		—
2010	158		64.6%
2020	190		20.3%
U.S. Decennial Census; 1860–1870 1880-1890; 1900 1910 1920; 1930 1940 1950; 1960 1970 1980; 1990 2000 2010; 2020

Kirkwood first appeared as a census designated place in the 2000 U.S. census.

=== 2020 census ===
Kirkwood CDP, California – Racial and ethnic composition Note: the US Census treats Hispanic/Latino as an ethnic category. This table excludes Latinos from the racial categories and assigns them to a separate category. Hispanics/Latinos may be of any race.
Race / Ethnicity (NH = Non-Hispanic)	Pop 2000	Pop 2010	Pop 2020	% 2000	% 2010	% 2020
White alone (NH)	81	148	159	84.38%	93.67%	83.68%
Black or African American alone (NH)	0	0	6	0.00%	0.00%	3.16%
Native American or Alaska Native alone (NH)	2	3	6	2.08%	1.90%	3.16%
Asian alone (NH)	2	1	5	2.08%	0.63%	2.63%
Native Hawaiian or Pacific Islander alone (NH)	1	0	0	1.04%	0.00%	0.00%
Other race alone (NH)	0	0	1	0.00%	0.00%	0.53%
Mixed race or Multiracial (NH)	5	0	6	5.21%	0.00%	3.16%
Hispanic or Latino (any race)	5	6	7	5.21%	3.80%	3.68%
Total	96	158	190	100.00%	100.00%	100.00%

The 2020 United States census reported that Kirkwood had a population of 190. The population density was 43.6 inhabitants per square mile (16.8/km^{2}). The racial makeup of Kirkwood was 84.2% White, 3.2% African American, 3.7% Native American, 2.6% Asian, 0.0% Pacific Islander, 1.1% from other races, and 5.3% from two or more races. Hispanic or Latino of any race were 3.7% of the population.

The Census reported that 72.6% of the population lived in households, 26.8% lived in non-institutionalized group quarters, and 0.5% were institutionalized.

There were 81 households, out of which 8.6% included children under the age of 18, 13.6% were married-couple households, 11.1% were cohabiting couple households, 18.5% had a female householder with no partner present, and 56.8% had a male householder with no partner present. 56.8% of households were one person, and 7.4% were one person aged 65 or older. The average household size was 1.7. There were 22 families (27.2% of all households).

The age distribution was 5.8% under the age of 18, 11.1% aged 18 to 24, 33.2% aged 25 to 44, 34.2% aged 45 to 64, and 15.8% who were 65 years of age or older. The median age was 45.0 years. There were 121 males and 69 females.

There were 659 housing units at an average density of 151.2 units per square mile (58.4 units/km^{2}), of which 81 (12.3%) were occupied. Of these, 32.1% were owner-occupied, and 67.9% were occupied by renters.

== Infrastructure ==
The Kirkwood Mountain Resort was built with a micro-utility providing electric power without connecting to the state electric grid. The community was eventually connected when the town of Kirkwood took over the utility.
