= Silver Creek, California =

Silver Creek
- Former settlement
- Location in California
- Coordinates: 39°56′40″N 121°04′18″W
- Country: United States
- State: California
- County: Plumas
- Elevation: 3,724 ft (1,135 m)

Silver Creek is a former settlement in Plumas County, California, United States. It lay at an elevation of 3724 feet (1135 m). Silver Creek is located 1.25 miles (2.0 km) north-northwest of Meadow Valley.

== History ==
Silver Creek was the home to the largest Chinese settlement of Plumas County, with over 500 residents, which lasted from about 1855 to the 1920s. It became the commercial center for the county's Chinese population, with hotels, restaurants, stores, worship and social places. The land surrounding the town was later dredged away, leaving only a few remnants to see today.
