= Alpine County Courthouse =

- U.S. National Register of Historic Places
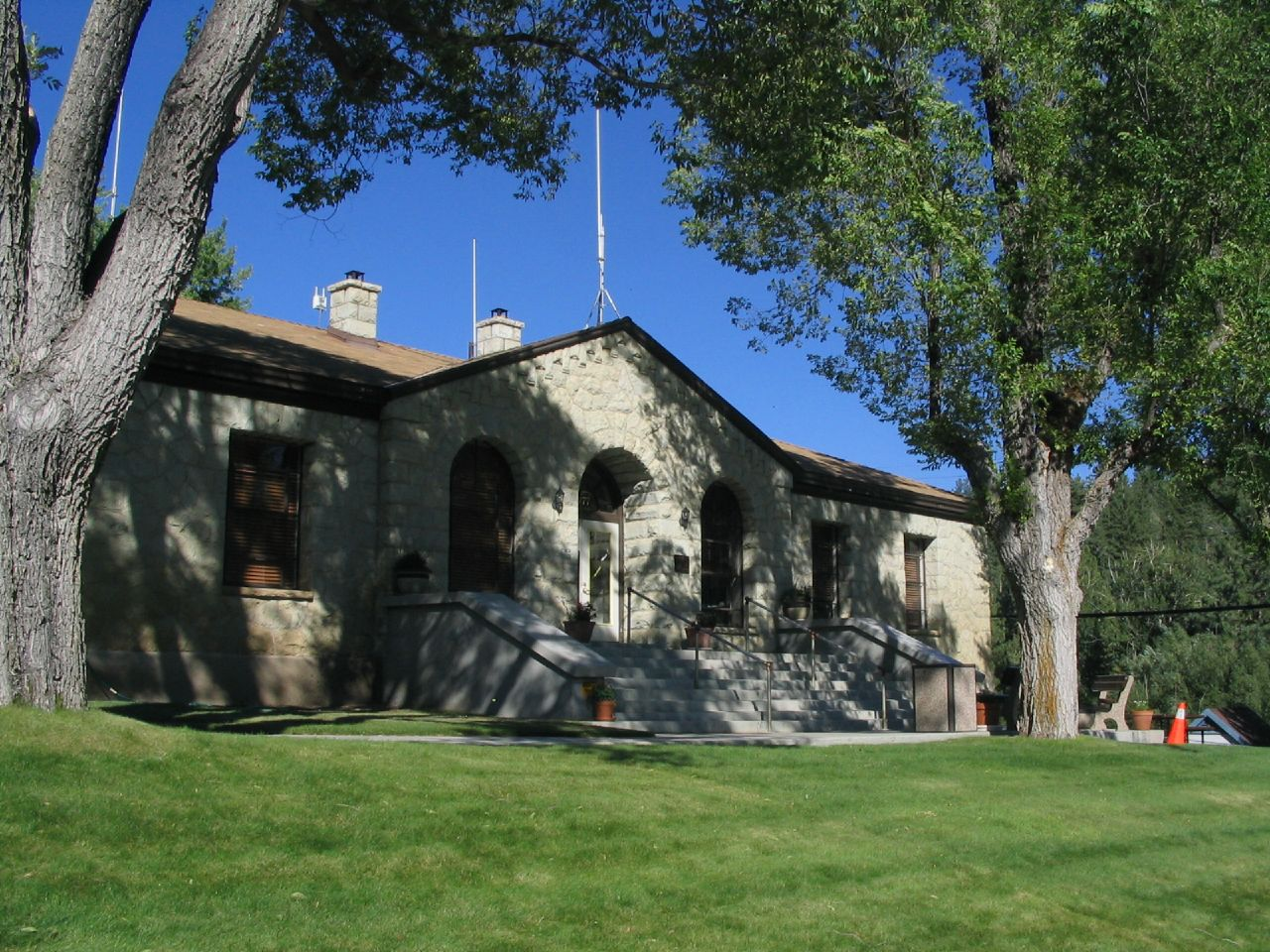

- Location within California Location within the United States
- Location: 14777 State Route 89; Markleeville, California
- Coordinates: 38°41′40″N 119°46′43″W
- Built: 1928
- Architect: Frederic Joseph DeLongchamps
- NRHP reference No.: 04001074
- Added to NRHP: September 30, 2004

Superior Court of California, County of Alpine
- Interactive map of Superior Court of California, County of Alpine
- Established: 1864
- Jurisdiction: Alpine County, California
- Location: Markleeville
- Appeals to: California Court of Appeal for the Third District
- Website: alpine.courts.ca.gov

Presiding Judge
- Currently: Hon. Richard D. Meyer

Court Executive Officer
- Currently: Christina Matta

Alpine County Courthouse is a building built in 1928 in Markleeville, California. It was listed on the National Register of Historic Places in 2004. It houses the Superior Court of California, County of Alpine, informally the Alpine County Superior Court, the California superior court with jurisdiction over Alpine County. Alpine is the smallest county in California by population.

== History ==
Alpine County was formed in 1864 following the Comstock Lode discovery, partitioned from neighboring Amador, El Dorado, Calaveras, Mono, and Tuolumne counties.

At the time of the county's formation, Silver Mountain City was the county seat and most populated town, but the mines were shuttered and Silver Mountain City was abandoned soon after Congress demonetized silver in 1873. The county seat was moved to Markleeville in 1874. Court was held in the Markleeville Odd Fellows Hall starting in 1875, with prisoners held in the Old Log Jail.

The cornerstone of the courthouse was laid in June 1928. The courthouse opened in September of the same year. The cost of building the structure was $75,000. Over the years, the courthouse served as the superior and municipal court for Alpine County, the district attorney's office, the sheriff's office, and the probation department.

The current Alpine County Courthouse was originally completed in 1928 to serve as the firehouse and one-engine garage. It was designed by Frederick J. DeLongchamps and built from locally quarried rhyolite tuff blocks, quarried above nearby Silver Mountain City, in the Romanesque Revival style. Other stone used in the structure was taken from the ruins of the jail of Silver Creek in Plumas County. The building was originally intended to be a two-story structure but financial considerations limited it to one story; residents had passed a US$18,000 (equivalent to $330,000 in 2025) bond issue in 1927 to fund construction.

In 1948 the basement of the courthouse was remodeled to provide additional storage space. The remodeling was overseen by Fenwick Irwin. In 1987, footage from the CBS show High Mountain Rangers was shot at the courthouse.

The 1928 courthouse was added to the National Register of Historic Places in 2004.

The Alpine County courthouse is still in use.

=== Proposed new courthouse ===
Funding was authorized for a new Alpine County Courthouse in 2008 via California Senate Bill 1407, but plans were canceled in December 2011.
