= Sly Park, California =

Unincorporated community in California, United States

Sly Park
- Unincorporated community
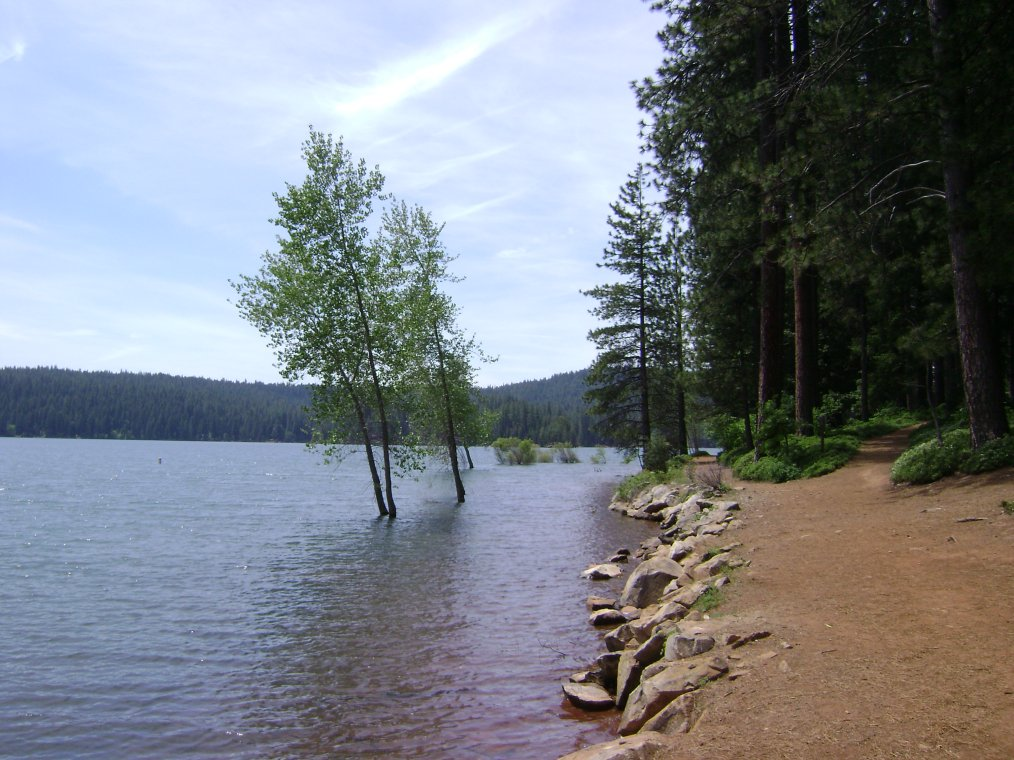
- Jenkinson Lake near Sly Park

- Location in California Sly Park (the United States)
- Coordinates: 38°43′17″N 120°35′05″W
- Country: United States
- State: California
- County: El Dorado
- Elevation: 3,560 ft (1,085 m)

Sly Park is an unincorporated community in El Dorado County, California, United States. It is located in Sly Valley 13 miles (21 km) east of Placerville, at an elevation of 3560 feet (1085 m).

A post office operated at Sly Park from 1891 to 1919, with several moves. The name honors James Calvin Sly, one of the Mormons who discovered Sly Valley.
