= Martell, California =

Martell
- census-designated place
- Location in California
- Coordinates: 38°22′01″N 120°47′46″W
- Country: United States
- State: California
- County: Amador

Area
  - Total: 2.188 sq mi (5.667 km^{2})
  - Land: 2.187 sq mi (5.664 km^{2})
  - Water: 0.0012 sq mi (0.003 km^{2}) 0.04%
- Elevation: 1,486 ft (453 m)

Population (2020)
  - Total: 207
  - Density: 94.7/sq mi (36.5/km^{2})
- ZIP Code: 95654
- Area code: 209
- GNIS feature ID: 228158

Martell (formerly Oneida) is a census-designated place in Amador County, California, United States. It is located 1.5 miles (2.4 km) northwest of Jackson, at an elevation of 1486 feet (453 m). The population was 207 at the 2020 census.

Martell is located west of Jackson and east of Ione, by which it is connected by the Amador Central Railroad. Martell is where several major retail and restaurant outlets for Amador County are located.

The community is in ZIP code 95654 and area code 209.

== Demographics ==
Historical population
Census	Pop.	Note	%±
2010	282		—
2020	207		−26.6%
U.S. Decennial Census; 2010

Martell first appeared as a census designated place in the 2010 U.S. census.

The 2020 United States census reported that Martell had a population of 207. The population density was 94.7 inhabitants per square mile (36.6/km^{2}). The racial makeup of Martell was 73.4% White, 1.4% African American, 1.9% Native American, 2.9% Asian, 0.0% Pacific Islander, 8.7% from other races, and 11.6% from two or more races. Hispanic or Latino of any race were 15.0% of the population.

The Census reported that 93.7% of the population lived in households, 6.3% lived in non-institutionalized group quarters, and none were institutionalized.

There were 95 households, out of which 25.3% included children under the age of 18, 38.9% were married-couple households, 9.5% were cohabiting couple households, 28.4% had a female householder with no partner present, and 23.2% had a male householder with no partner present. 27.4% of households were one person, and 18.9% were one person aged 65 or older. The average household size was 2.04. There were 57 families (60.0% of all households).

The age distribution was 23.7% under the age of 18, 6.3% aged 18 to 24, 10.6% aged 25 to 44, 30.4% aged 45 to 64, and 29.0% who were 65 years of age or older. The median age was 53.9 years. For every 100 females, there were 105.0 males.

There were 103 housing units at an average density of 47.1 units per square mile (18.2 units/km^{2}), of which 95 (92.2%) were occupied. Of these, 69.5% were owner-occupied, and 30.5% were occupied by renters.

== Politics ==
In the state legislature, Martell is in the 4th senatorial district, represented by Republican Marie Alvarado-Gil, and the 1st Assembly district, represented by Republican Heather Hadwick. Federally, Martell is in California's 5th congressional district, represented by Republican Tom McClintock.
