= Eldorado National Forest =

U.S. National Forest in California designated in 1910

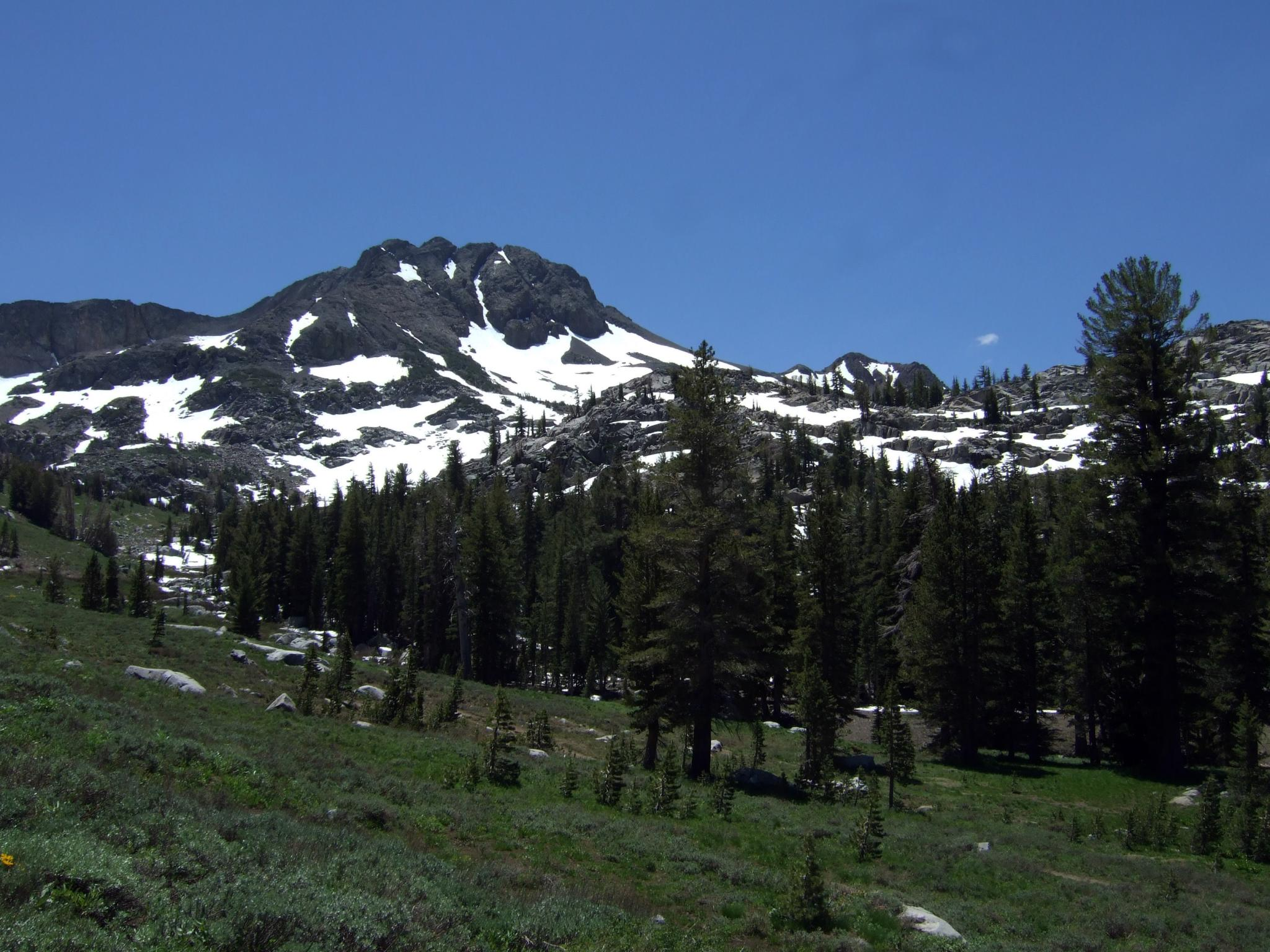
- Interactive map of Eldorado National Forest
- Location: El Dorado, Amador, Alpine, Placer counties, California, and Douglas County, Nevada, United States
- Nearest city: Placerville, CA
- Coordinates: 38°45′N 120°20′W
- Area: 596,724 acres (2,414.86 km^{2})
- Established: July 28, 1910
- Governing body: U.S. Forest Service
- Website: Eldorado National Forest

Eldorado National Forest is a U.S. National Forest located in the central Sierra Nevada mountain range, in eastern California.

== Geography ==
Most of the forest (72.8%) lies in El Dorado County. In descending order of land area the others counties are: Amador, Alpine, and Placer counties in California; and Douglas County in Nevada with 78 acres (320,000 m^{2}). The forest is bordered on the north by the Tahoe National Forest, on the east by the Lake Tahoe Basin Management Unit, on the southeast by the Humboldt–Toiyabe National Forest, and to the south by the Stanislaus National Forest.

Eldorado National Forest headquarters are located in Placerville, California. There are local ranger district offices in Camino, Georgetown, Pioneer, and Pollock Pines.

=== Land ownership ===
A complicated ownership pattern exists. The parcels of other ownership (private or other agency land) are mostly isolated and surrounded on all sides by government land. An opposite pattern occurs outside of the forest boundary, where several small scattered pieces of national forest lands are separated from the main body and surrounded by lands of other ownership.

- Gross area: 786,994 acres (3,185 km²)
- Other ownership: 190,270 acres (770 km²)
- Net area: 596,724 acres (2,415 km²)

=== Elevations ===
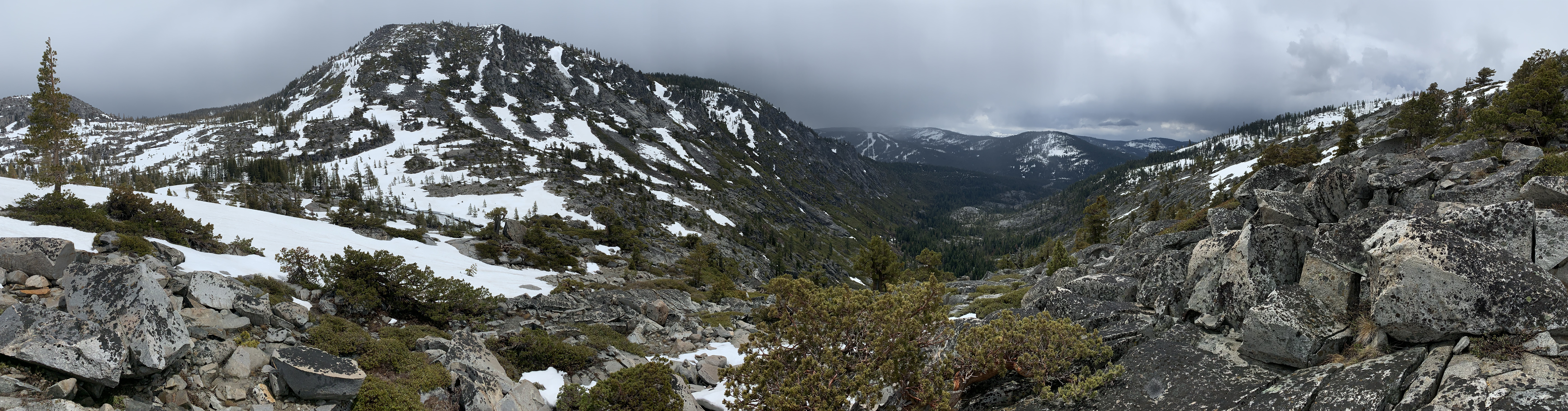
A panorama from a trail within the forest

The forest ranges in elevation from 1,000 feet (300 m) in the foothills to more than 10,000 feet (3,000 m) above sea level along the Sierra crest. The mountainous topography is broken by the steep canyons of the Mokelumne, Cosumnes, American, and Rubicon rivers. Plateaus of generally moderate relief are located between these steep canyons.

=== Wilderness areas ===
The Desolation Wilderness is located within the forest's boundaries, as is most of the Mokelumne Wilderness (which extends into neighboring Stanislaus National Forest and Humboldt–Toiyabe National Forest).

== Climate ==
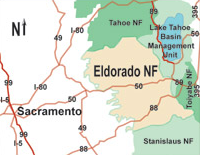
Eldorado National Forest in California

A cool montane version of Mediterranean climate extends over most of the forest, with warm, dry summers and cold, wet winters.

- Annual precipitation: 40 to 70 inches (1,000 to 1,800 mm) on average.
  - Precipitation falls mainly from October through April.
- Temperature range: 0 °F (-20 °C) in winter to 100 °F (38 °C) in the summer.
- Snow pack: 5 to 10 feet (1.5 to 3.0 m) on average, can be as high as 15 feet (4.6 m).
  - Snow is present from December to May at elevations above 6,000 feet (1,800 m).

== Ecology ==
=== Vegetation ===
A wide variety of hardwoods, conifers, shrubs, native grasses, and forbs are represented in the various Eldorado National Forest ecosystems.

The principal plant communities found here are:

- Interior chaparral
- Oak woodlands
- Lower Montane forest — indicator species: Pinus ponderosa, Pinus jeffreyi
- Upper Montane forest — indicator species: Abies magnifica
- Subalpine zone.

Old-growth forests totaling 122,000 acres (49,000 ha) have been identified in the Eldorado National Forest, consisting of:

Sierra Nevada mixed conifer forests

- Coast Douglas-fir (Pseudotsuga menziesii var. menziesii)
- Ponderosa pine (Pinus ponderosa)
- White fir (Abies concolor)

and

- Lodgepole pine (Pinus contorta) forests
- Red fir (Abies magnifica) forests

==== Logging ====
The major commercial forest species are white fir, red fir, ponderosa pine, Jeffrey pine, sugar pine, Douglas fir, and incense cedar.

== Water ==
Water is a major resource of the Eldorado National Forest. The forest receives about 56 inches (1,400 mm) of precipitation annually. Average annual runoff is about 29 inches (740 mm). This is equal to an annual water yield of 2.4 acre-feet (3,000 m^{3}) per acre (737,000 m³/km²); therefore National Forest lands yield an estimated 1,444,000 acre-feet (1.781×10^{9} m^{3}) annually.

- 611 miles (983 km) of fishable streams in four major drainage systems: Middle Fork of the American River (including the Rubicon), South Fork of the American River, Cosumnes River, and North Fork of the Mokelumne River.
- 297 lakes and reservoirs (including both public and private land), which total 11,994 acres (48.5 km²). 11 large reservoirs account for 9,000 acres (36 km²). The rest are mostly small, high mountain lakes.

== Transportation ==
The Eldorado National Forest has a high density of transportation routes, with 2,367 miles (3,809 km) of roads, and 349 miles (562 km) of trails. Roads under Forest Service jurisdiction total 2,158 miles (3,473 km). There are 209 miles (336 km) of county roads, and 400 miles (640 km) of private roads within the National Forest boundaries.

== History ==
The forest was established on July 28, 1910, from a portion of Tahoe National Forest and other lands.

== See also ==
- List of national forests of the United States
- List of plants of the Sierra Nevada (U.S.)
- Category:Fauna of the Sierra Nevada (United States)
