= Routes of the California Trail =

19th century Californian path network

The routes of the California Trail encompass the extensive network of overland paths used by 19th-century emigrants travelling to California, primarily between 1841–69. While the main California Trail followed the Platte, Sweetwater, and Humboldt river valleys, numerous branches, cutoffs, and feeder routes evolved to accommodate changing geography, seasonal conditions, and emigrant needs. These included the Truckee Trail, Carson Trail, Salt Lake Cutoff, Sublette-Greenwood Cutoff, Applegate–Lassen Trail, and the Central Overland Route, among others.

The trail system began at various Missouri River towns—such as Independence, St. Joseph, Kanesville, and Omaha—and extended westward through Nebraska, Wyoming, Utah, Idaho, and Nevada. Emigrants faced challenges including cholera outbreaks, desert crossings, and steep mountain passes. Key landmarks included Fort Kearny, South Pass, Independence Rock, and the Forty Mile Desert. The final leg required crossing the Sierra Nevada via routes like Donner Pass, Carson Pass, and Roller Pass.

By 1869, the completion of the transcontinental railroad rendered most of these routes obsolete for mass migration, though they continued to serve freight, stagecoach, and telegraph traffic. Today, many segments are preserved as historic trails and scenic byways.

== Eastern migrant trails ==
The Oregon, California, Mormon and later the shorter Bozeman Trails (sometimes called the Emigrant Trails) all went west along much of the same network of trails until Wyoming, Utah or Idaho, where they split off to reach their respective destinations. The exact route of the trail to get to California depended on the starting point of the trip, the final destination in California, the whims of the pioneers, the water and grass available on the trail, the threats of Indian attacks on parts of the trail, and the information they had or acquired along the way and the time of year. No government agents or bodies controlled the numbers and routing of the emigrants. The only "help" they could depend on was from their fellow travelers, a few blacksmiths and entrepreneurs running trading posts, and the few Army forts scattered along the road in Nebraska and Wyoming. In emergencies, the early pioneers, with and without Army help, nearly always organized relief parties.

To get the two essentials, water and grass for the travelers and their animals, the trails nearly always followed river valleys across the continent. The other "essential," 'wood' for fires, utilized any easily found burnable fuel—trees, brush, 'buffalo chips', abandoned wagons and supplies, sage brush, etc.. The wagons and their teams were the ultimate "off road" equipment in their time and were able to traverse incredibly steep mountain ranges, gullies, large and small streams, forests, brush, and other rough country. Initially, the almost total lack of improved roads severely constrained travel in some areas, as the pioneers had to detour, find, or make a way through or around difficult terrain. The trails, when not in flat country, typically went down ridge tops to avoid the trees and gullies normally found in valleys. When the Army established the shorter Central Overland Route in 1859 from Salt Lake City, Utah to Carson City, Nevada, it used local streams and springs found in the desert along the way. On the open plains, the wagons typically spread out to minimize traveling in dust. Later travelers typically used improvements and routes established by previous travelers. To be able to finish the four- to six-month trip in one season, most trips were started in early April or May, as soon as the grass was growing and the trails were dry enough to support the wagons. The trips hopefully terminated in early September or October before snow started falling again.

Feeder routes or Eastern branches of the named emigrant trails crossed the states of Missouri and Iowa before reaching and crossing the Missouri River. Initially, steamboat navigable waters on the Missouri River ended just upstream of Independence, Missouri/Kansas City, Kansas. By 1846, the Great Flood of 1844's damage to up-river traffic was fixed, as primitive dredging had opened up the Missouri River as far as the Platte River confluence near Kanesville, Iowa (later renamed Council Bluffs). By 1853, Omaha, Nebraska, on the west bank, became the starting point of choice for many, as armed conflicts in "Bleeding Kansas" made travel across Kansas more hazardous.

Many emigrants from the eastern seaboard traveled by foot or wagon and later train from the east coast across the Allegheny Mountains to Brownsville, Pennsylvania (a barge building and outfitting center on the Monongahela River), or Pittsburgh (where the Monongahela and Allegheny Rivers formed the Ohio River), and thence on flatboats or steamboats to St. Louis, Missouri. Many others from Europe traveled by sailing ship to the mouth of the Mississippi River where steam powered tugs towed them up river about 80 miles (130 km) to New Orleans, Louisiana. From there, cheap but fast steamboats brought them to St. Louis for about $5 in six days. Many bought most of their supplies, wagons and teams in St. Louis and then traveled by steamboat up the Missouri River to their departure point.

The main branch(es) of the trail started at one of several towns on the Missouri River—Independence/Kansas City, St. Joseph, Missouri, Kanesville and Omaha, plus others. Those starting in either St. Joseph/Independence, Missouri, or Kansas City, Kansas, typically followed the Santa Fe Trail route until they could be ferried across the Kansas and Wakarusa Rivers. They then followed either the Little Blue River or Republican River across Kansas and into Nebraska. If they started above the Kansas and Missouri River junction from the future town sites of Atchison, Kansas or Leavenworth, Kansas, they typically traversed northwest across the plains until they encountered the Big Blue River and its tributary, the Little Blue. The trail generally followed the Little Blue, which ended near the Platte River. The only general problem through the rolling hills of Kansas was the need to cross several large creeks or rivers with sharp banks. These required either doing a lot of work to dig a wagon ford, or using a previously established ford or toll bridge. In Nebraska and Kansas, Indian tribes ran many of the toll bridges or ferries.

Western trails in Nebraska. The Mormon Trail is in blue; the Oregon and California Trails and the Pony Express route in red; an alternate Oregon/California route in dashed red; lesser-used trails in orange. The Platte River is between the Mormon and Oregon/California Trail. Fort Kearny is the black dot.

If they started in Iowa or Nebraska, after getting across the Missouri River, most followed the northern side of the Platte River from near its junction on the Missouri River ferrying across the Elkhorn River and the wide and muddy Loup River, which intercept the Platte River. As the 1850s progressed and armed hostilities escalated in "bleeding" Kansas, travelers increasingly traveled up the Missouri River to leave from or near Omaha. After 1847, many ferries and steamboats were active during the emigration season start to facilitate crossing the Missouri to the Nebraska or Kansas side of the river.

When the Union Pacific Railroad started west in 1865, Omaha was their eastern terminus. The eastern end of the trail has been compared to a frayed rope of many strands that joined up at the Platte River near new Fort Kearny (est. 1848) in Nebraska. Those on the north side of the Platte would have to cross the Platte River to use the mail, repair and supply services available at Fort Kearny.

=== Cholera and death on the trail ===
The preferred camping spots for travelers on the trails north and south of the muddy Platte River were along one of the many fresh water streams draining into the Platte or the occasional fresh water spring found along the way. These preferred camping spots became sources of cholera infections during the third cholera pandemic (1852–1860). Many thousands of people used the same camping spots whose water supplies became contaminated by human wastes. Cholera causes vomiting and severe diarrhea, and in places where human wastes contaminate water supplies the causal bacteria, Vibrio cholerae, could easily spread among travelers. Once the water supplies became contaminated, because the cholera bacillus is zoophilic (it can infect birds, various mammals, and live in micro-organisms) it could easily spread and remain a threat along much of the Trail. Cholera, when untreated, can result in fatality rates between fifty and ninety percent. Even after the British physician and pioneer of anesthesia, John Snow, had helped demonstrate that cholera was transmitted through water in 1854, it did not become common knowledge until decades later; scientists continued to debate the cause of cholera until the beginning of the twentieth century. Treatments were almost always ineffective and sometimes hastened death. It would have been a terrifying companion while crossing the desolate high plains and passes of the Rocky Mountain West.

Cholera killed many thousands in New York City, St. Louis, Missouri, New Orleans, Louisiana, and other towns on the Missouri and Mississippi Rivers who inadvertently drank cholera contaminated water. Cholera is thought to have been brought to these river cities, etc. and the California, Oregon and Mormon Trails by infected immigrants from Europe. These widespread infections and thousands of deaths finally gave impetus to building, at great cost, effective citywide water and sewage systems in many European and US cities.

Germs that caused cholera and other diseases were still undiscovered as a disease spreading mechanism in this era. The Germ theory of disease and the systematic observation of possible disease causing microorganisms were just starting in this era. The cause of cholera, ingesting invisible cholera germs from cholera-infected fecal contaminated water or food was not known. Although magnifying lenses had been discovered in 1592 effective microscopes that could see germs well were just being developed and widely used starting in the 1860s. The prevention or effective treatment for cholera, once patients were infected, were unknown in this era and death rates then sometimes reached 50% of infected people. Cholera infections spread rampantly in the era before possible sources of cholera were identified, cholera carriers isolated and before effective water and sewage treatment facilities were developed and deployed.

Many thousands of emigrants died in Kansas, Nebraska, and Wyoming and were buried along the trail in unmarked graves.

== Great Platte River Road ==
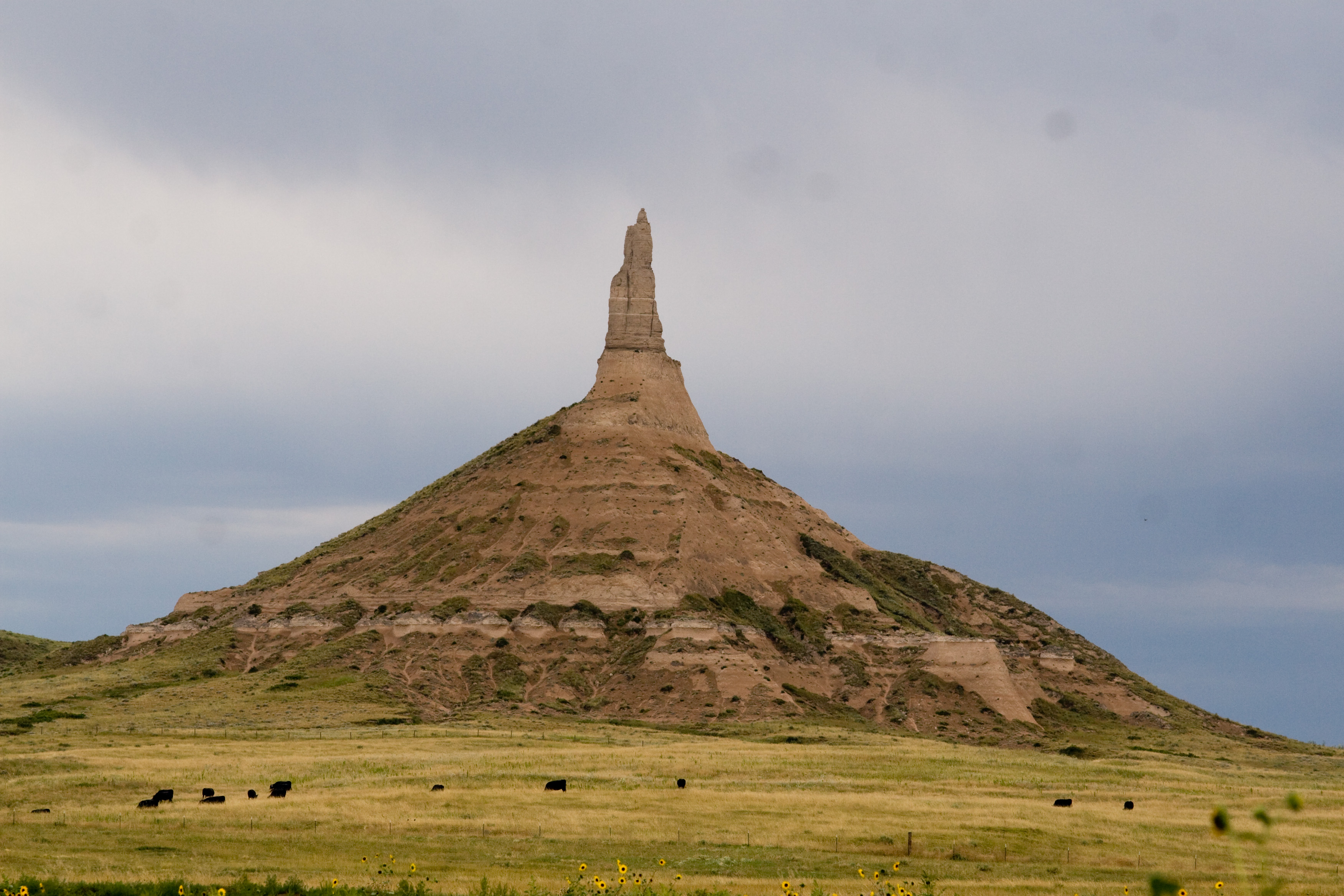
Chimney Rock, Nebraska

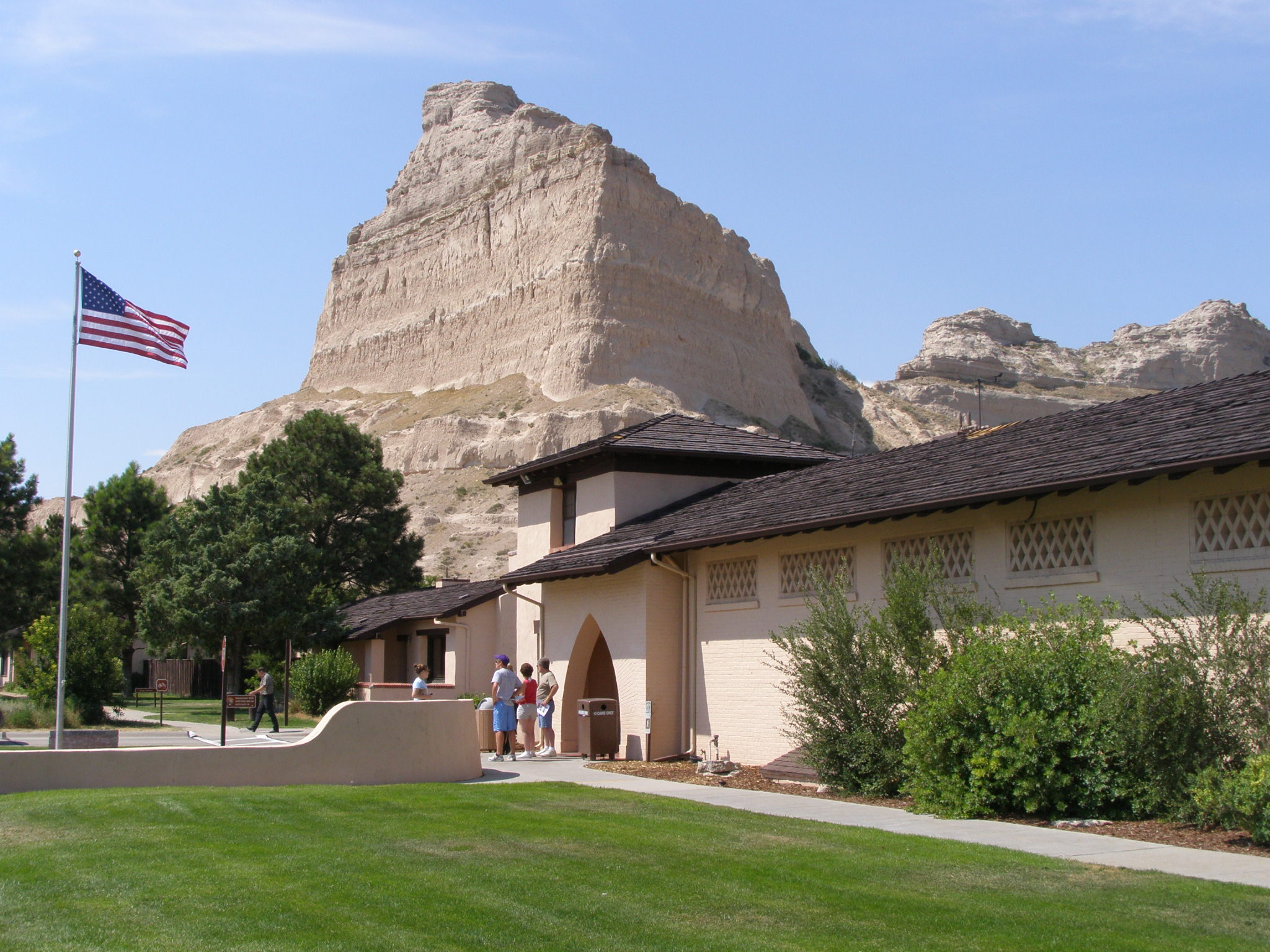
Scotts Bluff, Nebraska

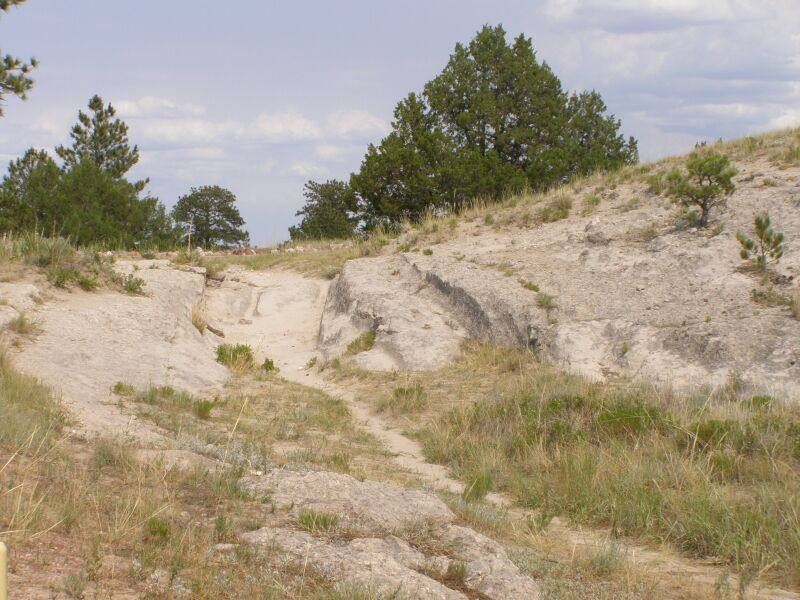
Trail Ruts, Wyoming

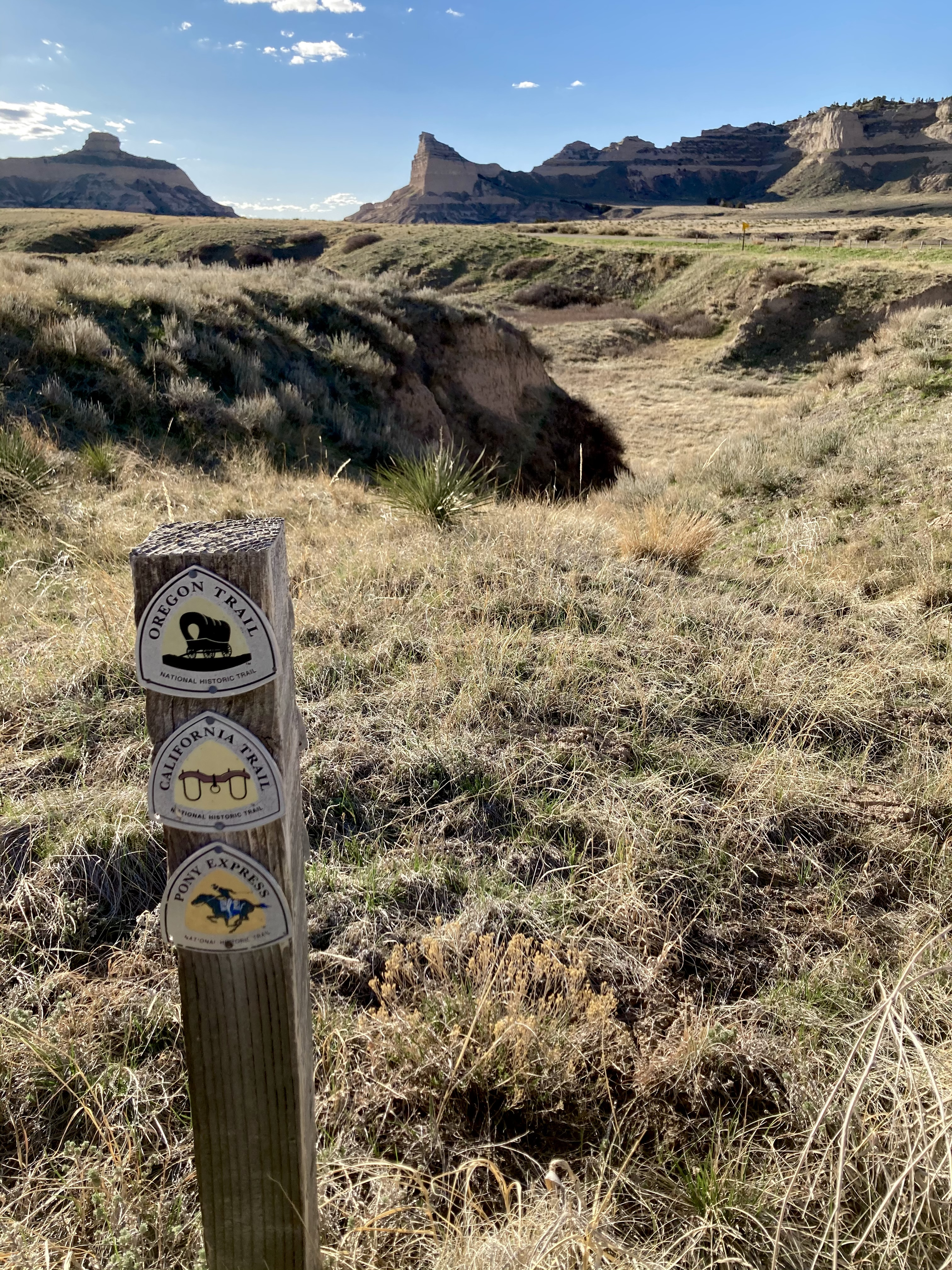
The California Trail as it approaches Scotts Bluff from the east

The Platte River in the future states of Nebraska and Wyoming typically had many channels and islands and was too shallow, crooked, muddy and unpredictable for even a canoe to travel very far on as it pursued its braided paths to the Missouri River. The Platte River Valley, however, provided an easily passable wagon corridor sloping easily up as it went almost due west with access to water, grass, buffalo meat and hides and 'buffalo chips' for fire 'wood'. There were trails on both sides of the muddy, about 1 mile (1.6 km) wide and shallow (2 to 60 inches (5.1 to 152.4 cm)) Platte River, becoming known as the Great Platte River Road. In all the trail(s) traveled about 450 miles (720 km) in the present state of Nebraska in the Platte River Valley. The Platte's water was silty and bad-tasting but it could be used if no other water was available. Letting it sit in a bucket for an hour or so allowed most of the silt to settle out.

Those traveling south of the Platte crossed the South Platte with its muddy and treacherous crossings using one of about three ferries (in dry years it could sometimes be forded without a ferry) before continuing up the North Platte into present-day Wyoming to Fort Laramie. After crossing over the South Platte the travelers encountered Ash Hollow with its steep descent down windlass hill. Several days further on they would encounter huge rock formations sticking out of the prairie called Courthouse Rock and twenty miles (32 km) further on the startling Chimney Rock, then Castle Rock, and finally Scotts Bluff. Before 1852 those on the North side ferried (or after about 1850 took a toll bridge) across the North Platte to the south side and Fort Laramie.

After 1852, they used Child's Cutoff to stay on the north side to about the present day town of Casper, Wyoming, where they crossed over to the south side. After crossing the Laramie River, the road west of Fort Laramie became much rougher as streams feeding the North Platte cut the terrain into many hills and ravines. The river was now often in a deep canyon, and the road had to veer away from it. Sallie Hester, an immigrant of 1850, described the terrain as something clawed by a gigantic bear: "sixty miles of the worst road in the world." In all from Omaha, Nebraska (1,050 feet (320 m)) the Platte and North Platte were followed for about 650 miles (1,050 km) to Casper (5,050 feet (1,540 m)). Fortunately, swifter flowing waters after Fort Laramie seemed to minimize the chance for cholera germ transmission, and its fatal attacks diminished significantly.

== Sweetwater River ==
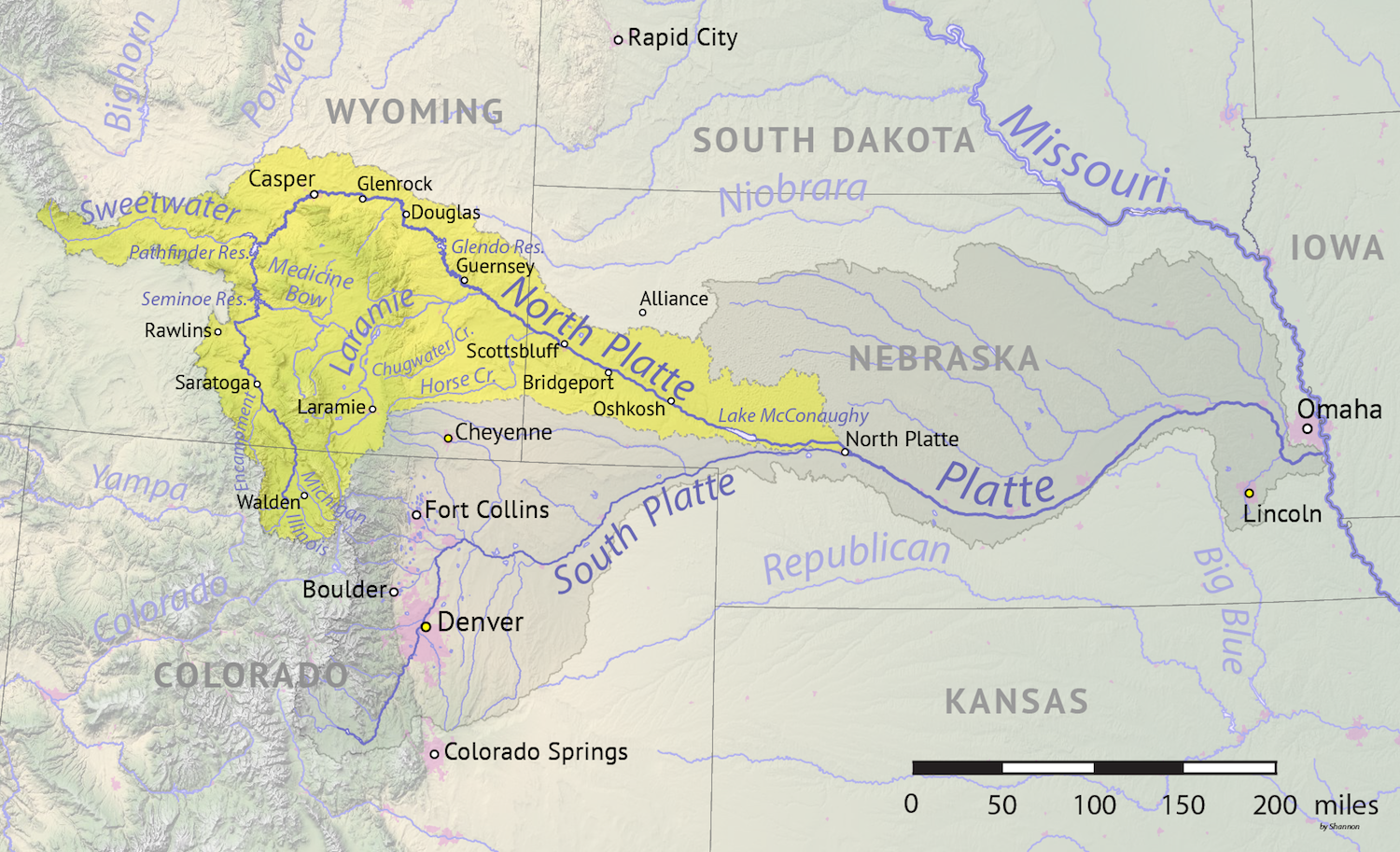
North Platte, Sweetwater Rivers across Wyoming

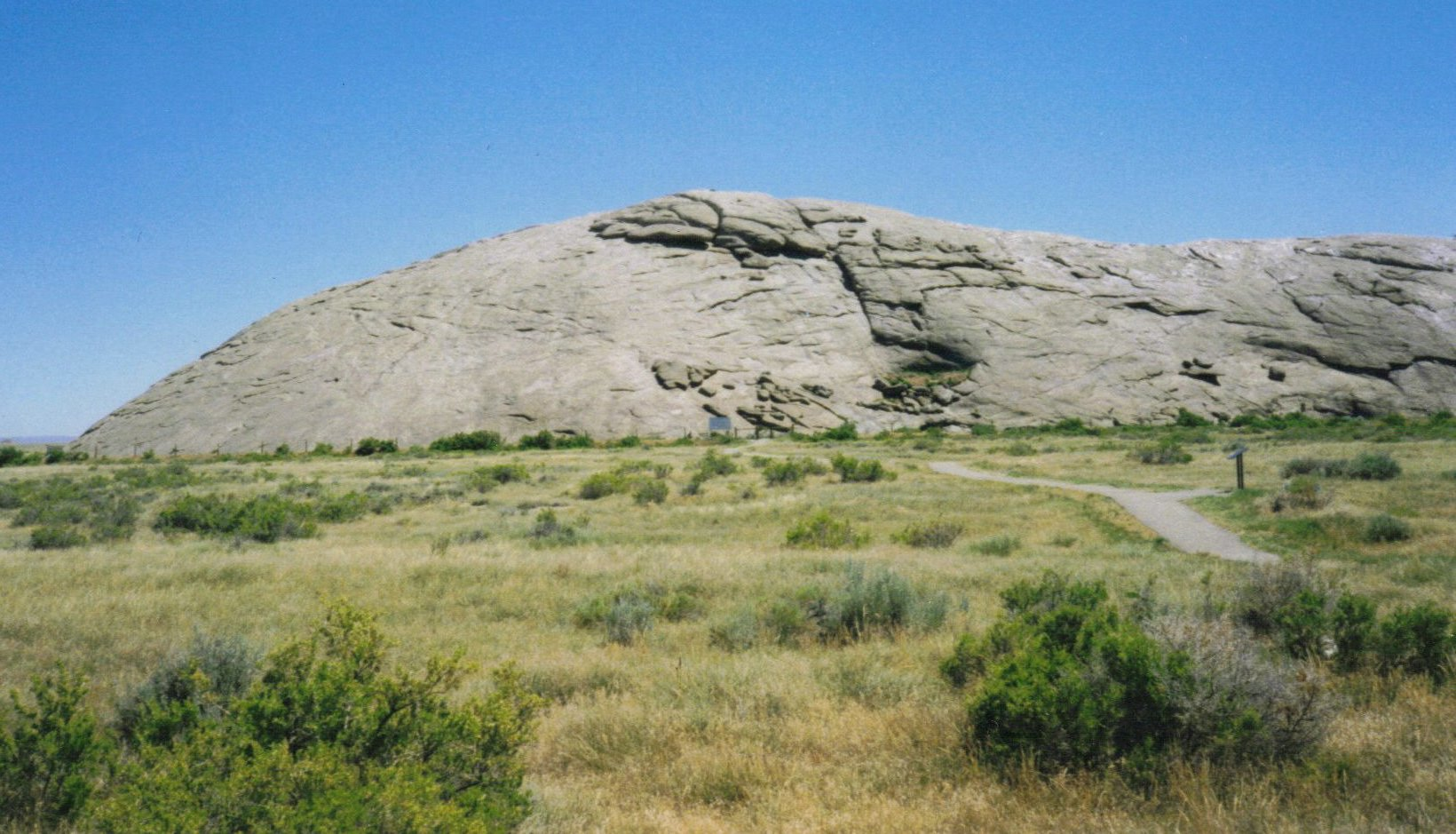
Independence Rock

Continuing upstream from Casper, the North Platte bends to the southwest headed for the Colorado Rockies. About 50 miles (80 km) southwest of Casper the North Platte is joined by the Sweetwater River (Wyoming). This river junction is deep in a canyon now filled by the Pathfinder Reservoir. The trail crossed over the North Platte by ferry and later by bridge. Some of the original immigrant travelers proceeded several miles along the North Platte River to Red Buttes, where a bend in the river formed a natural amphitheater dominated by red cliffs on the hill above. The cold North Platte was easier to ford here for those who were unwilling or unable to pay to cross at one of the ferries downstream. This was the last good camp spot before leaving the river and entering the water less stretch between the North Platte and the Sweetwater River. From here the settlers entered a difficult portion called Rock Avenue which moved from spring to spring across mostly alkaline soil and steep hills until it reached the Sweetwater River. Later settlers who had crossed to the northern side of the river at Casper would come to favor a route through a small valley called Emigrant Gap which headed directly to Rock Avenue, bypassing Red Buttes.

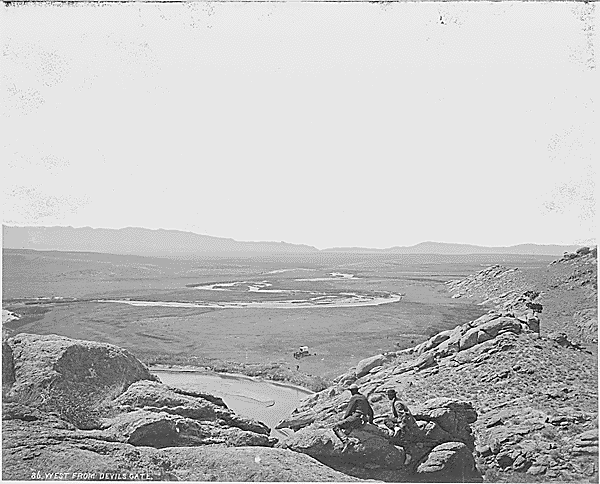
The Sweetwater River at Devil's Gate, 1870

Upon arrival in the Sweetwater valley, the trail encounters one of the most important landmarks on the trail, Independence Rock. Independence Rock was named by Jedediah Smith and party when they first observed it in 1824 on July 4--Independence Day in the United States. Jedediah and his fellow trappers rediscovered South Pass and the Sweetwater River in 1824. Immigrants also tried to reach Independence Rock on July 4 in order to help ensure that they will be at their destinations in California or Oregon before the winter snows came and closed the trails. Many of the travelers left their names on the rock, either carved or painted on with axle grease. It is estimated that more than 50,000 signatures were inscribed on Independence Rock. Other notable landmarks along the Sweetwater valley include Split Rock, Devil's Gate and Martin's Cove, where, in October to November 1856, the Martin Handcart Company was stranded by an early heavy snow and a late start and about 145 died before they were rescued by the rescue parties (about 250 wagons with supplies and help were dispatched from Utah) sent by Brigham Young from Salt Lake City.

The immigrant trail continues west along the Sweetwater River eventually crossing the meandering river nine times, including three times within a 2 miles (3.2 km) section through a narrow canyon in the Rattlesnake Hills. Prior to the 6th crossing, the trail crossed an unusual location known as Ice Slough. A covering of peat like vegetation grew over a small stream. The stream froze in winter and didn't thaw until early summer due to the insulating layer of vegetation. The ice was a welcome treat for settlers who were often enduring temperatures over 90 °F (32 °C) in July. The trail crosses the Sweetwater three more times and encounters a large hill known as Rocky Ridge on the northern side of the river. This barren and rocky section lasted almost 12 miles (19 km), and was considered a major obstacle in the trail. The same storm in November 1856 that debilitated the Martin Handcart Company also stranded the Willie Handcart Company on the eastern side of the ridge. Before rescuers could arrive, 56 people died in freezing temperatures out of a company of about 600. Following Rocky Ridge, the trail descends one more time into the Sweetwater valley to the ninth and final crossing of the Sweetwater at Burnt Ranch.

In 1853, a new route named Seminoe cutoff' was established on the southern side of the river. It was named after trapper Basil LaJeunesse who was referred to as Seminoe by the Shoshone Indians. The Seminoe cutoff split from the main trail at the 6th crossing and rejoined it at Burnt Ranch, bypassing both Rocky Ridge and four of the river crossings, which was an advantage in the early spring and summer during high runoff. The route was used extensively in the 1850s, especially by the Mormon companies.

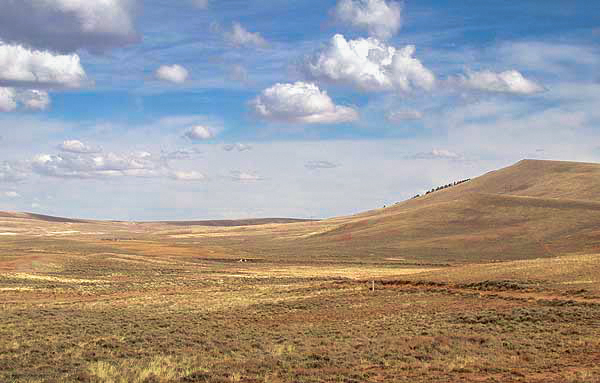
South Pass facing west toward Pacific Springs

Immediately after crossing the Sweetwater at Burnt Ranch the trail crosses the continental divide at South Pass, unarguably the most important landmark on the entire trail. South Pass itself is an unimpressive open saddle between the Wind River Range to the north and the Antelope Hills to the south, but it represented a major milestone in the trip. In 1848, Congress created the Oregon Territory which included all the territory in Wyoming west of the Continental Divide. Crossing South Pass meant that the settlers had truly arrived in the Oregon Territory, though their ultimate destination was still a great distance away. Nearby Pacific Springs offered the first water since the trail had left the Sweetwater River and marked the beginning of a relatively dry stretch of trail until the settlers reached Big Sandy River that joined with the Green River more than 40 miles (64 km) away.

== Main trail from South Pass through Fort Bridger to the Humboldt River ==
The main trail after crossing the South Pass encountered a number of small springs and creeks before hitting the Green River. After ferrying across the Green the main trail went on to Fort Bridger. Here they could take the Mormon Trail to Salt Lake City or go to Fort Hall. The main trail going to Fort Hall went almost due north from Fort Bridger to the Little Muddy Creek where it passed over the Bear River Divide to the pleasant Bear River Valley. The Bear River wanders about 350 miles (560 km) through three states as it makes a large inverted U around the north end of the Wasatch Range and then turns south and eventually empties into the Great Salt Lake as part of the Great Basin drainage system. The trail along the Bear usually had good grass, water, good fishing and wood. Once on the Bear River they followed the Bear's valley mostly north along today's Utah, Idaho, Wyoming border. In the Thomas Fork area, the trail is forced to go up "Big Hill" to by-pass a narrow canyon filled by the Bear River (Today's U.S. Route 30 blasted and bulldozed a wider canyon to follow the river). Big Hill had a tough ascent often requiring doubling up of teams and a very steep and dangerous descent (wagon trail scars are still visible today). A few miles further north is present day Montpelier, Idaho (site of an Oregon-California Trail interpretive Center). They followed the Bear River to present-day Soda Springs, Idaho. Here, there were many hot springs, mineral deposits, wood, and good grass and water. Many travelers stopped there for a few days to refresh their animals, themselves, wash clothes etc. A few miles after Soda Springs, the Bear River turned southwest towards the Great Salt Lake, and the main trail turned northwest near "Sheep's Rock" to follow the Portneuf River valley to Fort Hall (Idaho) in the Oregon Country along the Snake River. The route from Fort Bridger to Fort Hall was about 210 miles (340 km) taking nine to twelve days.

About 5 miles (8.0 km) west of Soda Springs, "Hudspeth's Cutoff" (est. 1849) took off from the main trail heading almost due west and by-passed Fort Hall. Hudspeth's Cutoff had five mountain ranges to cross and took about the same amount of time as the main route to Fort Hall but many took it thinking it was shorter. Its main advantage was that it did spread out the traffic on busy years and made more grass available.

The original California Trail pioneers, the Bartleson–Bidwell Party, only knew that California was west of Soda Springs—somewhere. They lacked guides or information on the best route west to California. Shortly after Soda Springs the Bear River heads southwest as it rounds the Wasatch Mountains and heads for the Great Salt Lake. Not knowing what else to do and knowing they needed grass and water, they followed the river. After following the Bear and building a trail through Cache Valley, Utah and crossing over the Malad Mountains, they got to somewhere near today's Bear River City, Utah. Then they realized the Bear River was going to terminate in the Great Salt Lake. Continuing west by going north of the Great Salt Lake across numerous alkali and salt-encrusted flats, they had a very difficult time because of the few springs and poor feed available for their animals. They finally abandoned their wagons in eastern Nevada when they realized the route they were on was getting ever rougher and they had missed the head of the Humboldt River. In addition, their animals were getting in ever poorer condition. After a very hard struggle they finished their trip to California successfully by building pack saddles for their horses, oxen and mules and converting their wagon train into a pack train. After finally finding the Humbodlt, they continued slogging west and continuing to struggle through most of November 1841 getting over the Sierra—gradually killing and eating up their oxen for food as their food supplies dwindled. The long and very difficult trail they had blazed was used by virtually none of the succeeding emigrants. (See: NPS California Trail Map for the "Bartleson–Bidwell Route") The very successful Salt Lake Cutoff, developed in 1848, went over much the same territory in Utah but stayed further north of the Great Salt Lake and had much better access to water and grass.

West of Fort Hall, the trail traveled about 40 miles (64 km) on the south side of the Snake River southwest towards present day Lake Walcott (reservoir) on the Snake River. At the junction of the Raft River and Snake River, the trail diverged from the Oregon Trail at another "Parting of the Ways" junction by leaving the Snake River and following the small and short Raft River about 65 miles (105 km) southwest past present day Almo, Idaho and the City of Rocks. Hudspeth's Cutoff rejoined the California trail at Cassia Creek on the Raft River about 20 miles (32 km) northeast of the City of Rocks. Nearly all were impressed by the City of Rocks—now a national reserve and Idaho State Park. Near the City of Rocks is where the Salt Lake Cutoff rejoined the California Trail. (For Oregon-California trail map in Idaho see: Oregon-California Trail in Idaho for trails in Wyoming, Idaho, Utah etc. see NPS National Trail Map.)

== Cutoffs between South Pass and Humboldt River ==
The Sublette-Greenwood Cutoff (established 1844) cut about 50 miles (80 km) off the main route through Fort Bridger. It left the main emigrant trail about 20 miles (32 km) from South Pass at Parting of the Ways junction and then headed almost due west. About ten miles (16 km) further they encountered Big Sandy River—about ten feet wide and one foot deep. This was the last water before crossing about 45 miles (72 km) of desert consisting of soft dry soil that rose in suffocating clouds before reaching the next water at the Green River about 4 miles (6.4 km) below the present town of La Barge, Wyoming. Here, the Green cut a steep 400 feet (120 m) channel through the Green River Desert, which travelers had to descend by a steep rocky path to reach the life-giving water. Often, thirsty teams stampeded to the water with terrible results. The descent was soon scattered with fragments of many wagons and dead animals. The Sublette cutoff saved about 50 miles (80 km) but the typical price was numerous dead oxen and the wrecks of many wagons. After crossing the Green they then had to continue crossing mountain ranges where the trail gets over 8,000 feet (2,400 m) in several places before finally connecting with the main trail near today's Cokeville, Wyoming in the Bear River valley. (For map See: Sublette-Greenwood Cutoff Map,)

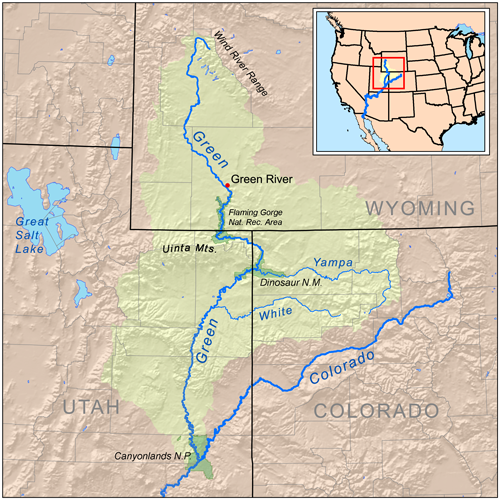
Green River watershed

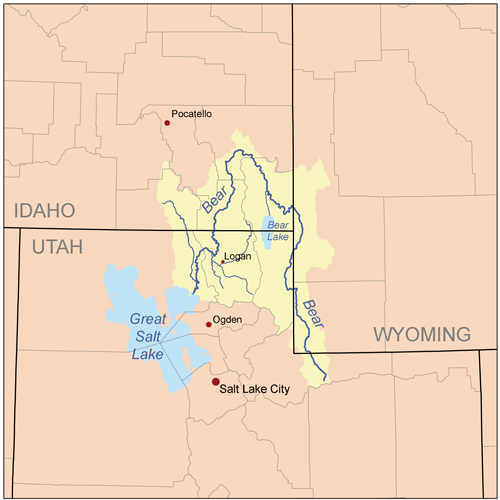
Map of the Bear River

The Green River is a major tributary of the Colorado River and is a large, deep and powerful river. It ranges from 100 to 300 feet (30 to 91 m) wide in the upper course where it typically was forded and ranges from 3 to 50 feet (0.91 to 15.24 m) in depth. After the opening of the Oregon, California and Mormon trails, several ferries were set up to cross it at both the main trail and the Sublette Cutoff; but during peak travel seasons in July the wait to cross was often several days. At the Green River on the main trail after crossing the river many took the Slate Creek Cutoff (also called the Kinney Cutoff), which turned north up the Green River for about ten miles (16 km) before turning almost due west to connect to the Sublette Cutoff road. This cutoff eliminated most of the waterless desert crossing of the Sublette Cutoff.

=== Salt Lake Cutoff ===
After 1848, those needing repairs, fresh livestock, fresh vegetables, fruit or other supplies could stay on the Mormon Trail for about 120 miles (190 km) from Fort Bridger to Salt Lake City, Utah and other Utah towns. Salt Lake City, located at about halfway 1,000 miles (1,600 km) on the trip, was the only significant settlement along the route. From Salt Lake City they could easily get back to the California (or Oregon) Trail by following the Salt Lake Cutoff about 180 miles (290 km) from Salt Lake City northwest around the north end of Great Salt Lake, rejoining the main trail at the City of Rocks near the present Idaho-Utah border. The trip from Fort Bridger via Salt Lake City to the City of Rocks was about 300 miles (480 km)—about 20 miles (32 km) shorter than the trail via Fort Hall.

=== Mormon Road: Southern Route of the California Trail ===
Hundreds of late arriving Forty-niners, and some parties of Mormons, both packers and teamsters, looking to avoid the fate of the Donner Party, in the fall and winter of 1849–1850 used the snow free Southern Route to Southern California. This route, that ran southwest from Salt Lake City, was pioneered by Jefferson Hunt in 1847–48 and a party of veterans of the Mormon Battalion returning from California in 1848. From Parowan onward to the southwest, the original route closely followed the route of the Old Spanish Trail diverting from that route between the Virgin River at Halfway Wash to Resting Springs, following the cutoff discovered by John Fremont on his return from California in 1844. This road only diverted to find places that could be traversed by the wagons of Mormon and Forty-niner parties that pioneered it. Later immigrants and the Mormon colonists of San Bernardino, in the early 1850s followed it. At the same time along what became known as the Mormon Road were seeded the Mormon settlements that developed into towns and cities of modern Utah, Arizona, Nevada and Southern California.

=== The Lander Road ===
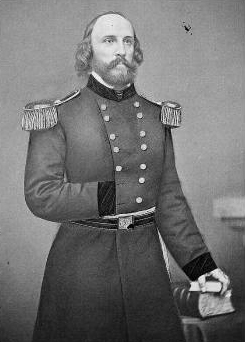
Frederick W. Lander

The Lander Road, located further north than the main trail to Fort Hall, also bypassed Fort Bridger and was about 85 miles (137 km) shorter to Fort Hall. It was built under the supervision of Frederick W. Lander by federal contractors in 1858—one of the first federally sponsored roads in the west. Lander's Road officially was called the Fort Kearney, South Pass and Honey Lake Road and was a federally funded attempt to improve the Oregon and California trails. The little used Honey Lake part of the proposed route near the present states of Nevada and California border was improved in 1859 under Lander's direction but did not go much beyond improving some watering holes—work ceased in 1860. The "Lander Road" was the first section of the federally funded road through the future states of Wyoming and Idaho. Expeditions under the command of Frederick W. Lander surveyed a new route starting at Burnt Ranch following the last crossing of the Sweetwater River before it turned west over South Pass. The Lander Road followed the Sweetwater River further north, skirting the Wind River Range before turning west and crossing the continental divide north of South Pass. The road crossed the Green River near the present town of Big Piney, Wyoming; then it passes over 8,800 feet (2,700 m) Thompson Pass in the Wyoming Range near the head of the Grey's River; and then it crosses another high pass across the Salt River Range before descending into Star Valley (Wyoming). The trail entered Star Valley about 6 miles (9.7 km) south of the present town of Smoot, Wyoming. From Smoot, the road then continued north about 20 miles (32 km) down Star Valley west of the Salt River before turning almost due west at Stump Creek near the present town of Auburn, Wyoming and passing into the present state of Idaho and following the Stump Creek valley about ten miles (16 km) northwest over the Caribou Range (this section of the trail is now accessible only by US Forest Service path as the main road (Wyoming Highway 34) now goes through Tincup canyon to get across the Caribous.) After crossing the Caribou Range the road split, turning almost ninety degrees and progressing southwest to Soda Springs, Idaho, or alternately heading almost due west and passing south of Grays Lake (now part of the Grays Lake National Wildlife Refuge) to Fort Hall Idaho. The Lander Road had good grass, fishing, water and wood but was high, rough and steep in many places. Later, after 1869, it was mostly used by ranchers moving their stock to and from summer grazing or markets.

By crossing the lush Wyoming and Salt River Ranges instead of circling via the deserts to the south, the route provided ample wood, grass and water for the travelers, and cut nearly 7 days off the total travel time for wagon trains going to Fort Hall. Despite the better conditions for livestock, the mountainous terrain and unpredictable weather made passage sometimes difficult and required continuing federally funded maintenance on the mountainous road—not a sure thing just before, during and after the American Civil War. Funds were appropriated in 1858 and 115 men (hired in Utah) completed the road in Wyoming and Idaho in 90 days, clearing timber and moving about 62,000 cubic yards (47,000 m^{3}) of earth. The Lander's road or cutoff opened in 1859 when it was extensively used. Records after 1859 are lacking and its use after that period are assumed to sharply decrease since the Sublette Cutoff, the Central Overland Route and other cutoffs were just about as fast or faster and were much less strenuous. Today the Lander cutoff road(s) are roughly followed by a series of county and Forest Service roads.

== South Pass to the Central Overland Route ==
An alternative route, the Central Overland Route, across Utah and Nevada that bypassed both Fort Hall and the Humboldt River trails was developed in 1859. This route was discovered, surveyed and developed by a team of U.S. Army workers led by Captain James H. Simpson of the U.S. Army Corps of Topographical Engineers and went from individual streams and springs across the Great Basin Desert in central Utah and Nevada—avoiding the Humboldt River trail and its often combative Indians and Forty Mile Desert. This route was about 280 miles (450 km) shorter and over ten days quicker. The route followed the Mormon Trail from South Pass to the newly settled Salt Lake City, Utah and passed south of the Great Salt Lake across central Utah and Nevada. The route today is approximated today by the roads from: Salt Lake City, Utah, Fairfield, Utah (then called Camp Floyd), Fish Springs National Wildlife Refuge, Callao, Utah, Ibapah, Utah to Ely, Nevada. From Ely the route is approximated by the U.S. Route 50 in Nevada from Ely, Nevada, to Carson City, Nevada. (See: Pony Express Map) Many California bound travelers took the about 280 miles (450 km) and over two weeks shorter Central Overland Route to Salt Lake City and across central Utah and Nevada. Initially the springs and trail were maintained by the army as a western supply route to Camp Floyd, which was set up after the Utah War of 1856–57. By 1860 Camp Floyd was abandoned as the army left to fight the U.S. Civil War and the Central Overland Route was their only long term legacy.

Starting in March 1860 and continuing until October 1861 the Pony express established many small relay stations along the Central Overland Route for their mail express riders. From the end of Central Overland route in Carson City, Nevada, they followed the Johnson Pass (Placerville route) to California since it was the fastest and only route that was then kept open in winter across the Sierra Nevada (U.S.) mountains. On March 2, 1861, before the American Civil War had actually begun at Fort Sumter, the United States Government formally revoked the contract of the Butterfield Overland Stagecoach Company in anticipation of the coming conflict. A more secure route for communication and passengers between the non-Confederate states and the west was needed. The stock, coaches, etc., on the southern Gila River route Butterfield Stage route through or close to some potential Confederate states were pulled off and moved to a new route between St. Joseph, Missouri and Placerville, California along the existing Oregon, California Trails to Salt Lake City and then through central Utah and Nevada. It took about three months to make the transfer of stages and stock, and to build a number of new stations, secure hay and grain, and get everything in readiness for operating a six-times-a-week mail line. On June 30, 1861, the Central Overland California Route from St. Joseph, Missouri, to Placerville, California, went into effect. By traveling day and night and using frequent team changes the stages could make the trip in about 28 days. News paper correspondents reported that they had a preview of hell when they took the trip.

These combined stage and Pony Express stations along the Central Route across Utah and Nevada were joined by the first transcontinental telegraph stations (completed October 24, 1861). From Salt Lake City, the telegraph line followed much of the Mormon-California-Oregon trail to Omaha, Nebraska. After the first transcontinental railroad was completed in 1869, the telegraph lines along the railroad tracks became the main line, since the required relay stations, lines and telegraph operators were much easier to supply and maintain along the railroad. The telegraph lines that diverged from the railroad lines or significant population centers were largely abandoned.

== Across the Great Basin on the Humboldt River ==
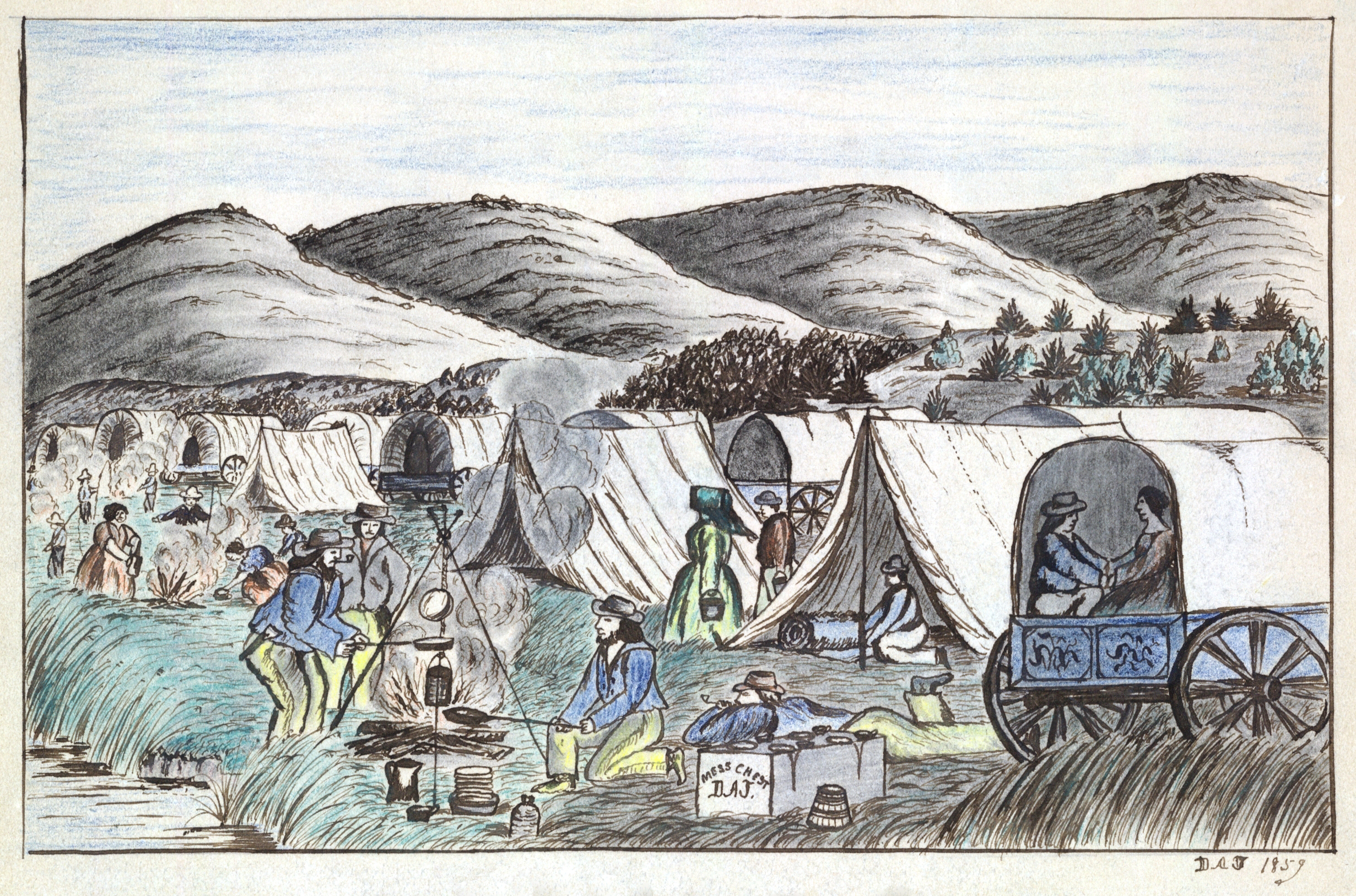
An encampment on the Humboldt River, 1859. Digitally restored.

The Humboldt River is fed by melting snow flowing from the Ruby and other mountains in north central Nevada and runs over 300 miles (480 km) mostly westward across the Great Basin to the Humboldt Sink in western Nevada where it evaporates. The Great Basin covers essentially all of Nevada and parts of Utah, Idaho, Oregon and California and has no outlet to the sea. The Great Basin lies in the rain shadow of the Sierra Nevada Mountains, and what little rainfall occurs there—stays there. The Humboldt, headed nearly straight west, provided an easily followed pathway with feed and water across the Great Basin desert. The Humboldt was praised for having water, fishing and feed along its banks and also cursed for its barely adequate grass, meandering and often muddy channel, and hot weather. Its water quality became progressively worse the further the river went west. The fire 'wood' needed for cooking and making coffee consisted of occasional junipers and ever present sagebrush and willows.

As found by about 1844, the trail at "parting of the ways" (Idaho) from the Snake River leads along the Raft River about 60 miles (97 km) southwest to the head of the Raft River and the City of Rocks (now called: City of Rocks National Reserve). The Hudspeth Cutoff and the Salt Lake Cutoff all rejoined the California Trail near the City of Rocks (For maps see NPS map California Trail:). The trail then continued west over 7,100 feet (2,200 m) Granite Pass, which involved a steep, treacherous descent. West of Granite Pass, the trail was in the Great Basin drainage. Rainfall in the Great Basin either flowed to the Humboldt River, sank into the ground or evaporated. The trail then jogged northwest until it reached Goose Creek where it headed southwest, nicking the far northwest corner of Utah and on into the future state of Nevada. The trail then headed southwest, down Goose Creek for about 34 miles (55 km) until it hit Thousand Springs Valley's creeks and springs. The trail followed Thousand Springs Valley until it intercepted West Brush Creek and Willow Creek, which run into the Humboldt River. This about 160 miles (260 km) trail through Idaho and Nevada connecting the Snake River to the Humboldt River passed enough springs and creeks to provide the necessary feed and water for the California bound emigrants. The trail hit the Humboldt River in northeastern Nevada near present-day Wells, Nevada. Another branch of the trail went through Bishops Canyon and intercepted the trail about 10 miles (16 km) west of Wells. Humboldt Wells had good water and grass. The distance from City of Rocks to Wells was about 100 miles (160 km).

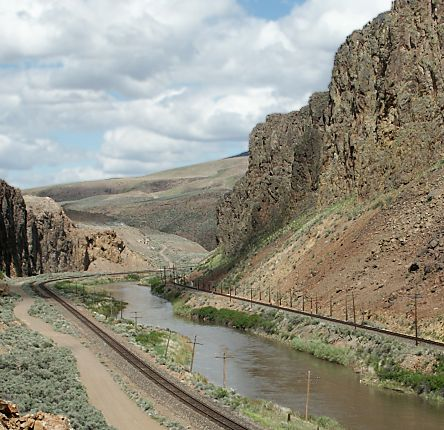
Humboldt River, Nevada

The trail followed the north banks of the Humboldt west for about 65 miles (105 km) until it encountered the narrow 5 miles (8.0 km) long Carlin Canyon on the Humboldt. Here the meandering river passed through a steep section of mountains, and its river valley became very narrow or only the width of the stream bed. Various trail guides said you would have to ford the Humboldt from four to nine times to get through the canyon. Carlin Canyon became nearly impassable during periods of high water and a cutoff, the Greenhorn Cutoff, was developed to bypass the canyon when flooded. West of Carlin Canyon, the trail climbed through Emigrant Pass and then descended again to rejoin the Humboldt at Gravelly Ford (near today's Beowawe, Nevada). At Gravelly Ford the often muddy Humboldt had a good gravel bottom and was easily forded. There was usually plenty of grass and fresh water springs nearby. Many stayed here a while to rest and recuperate their livestock and themselves. After the ford, the trail divided into two branches, following the north and south banks of the river. The trail on the north side of the river was much better, allowing an easy miss of the Reese River sink. Those who took the south side would have to travel around a big bend in the Humboldt and then cross the usually dry alkali-laden Reese River sink. The two branches of the Trail rejoined at Humboldt Bar (sink).

At the Humboldt Sink (about 100 miles (160 km) northeast of present-day Reno, Nevada) the Humboldt River disappeared into a marshy alkali laden lake that late in some years was a dry lake bed. Near the end of the Humboldt, one of the worst sections of the California Trail showed up, the Forty Mile Desert.

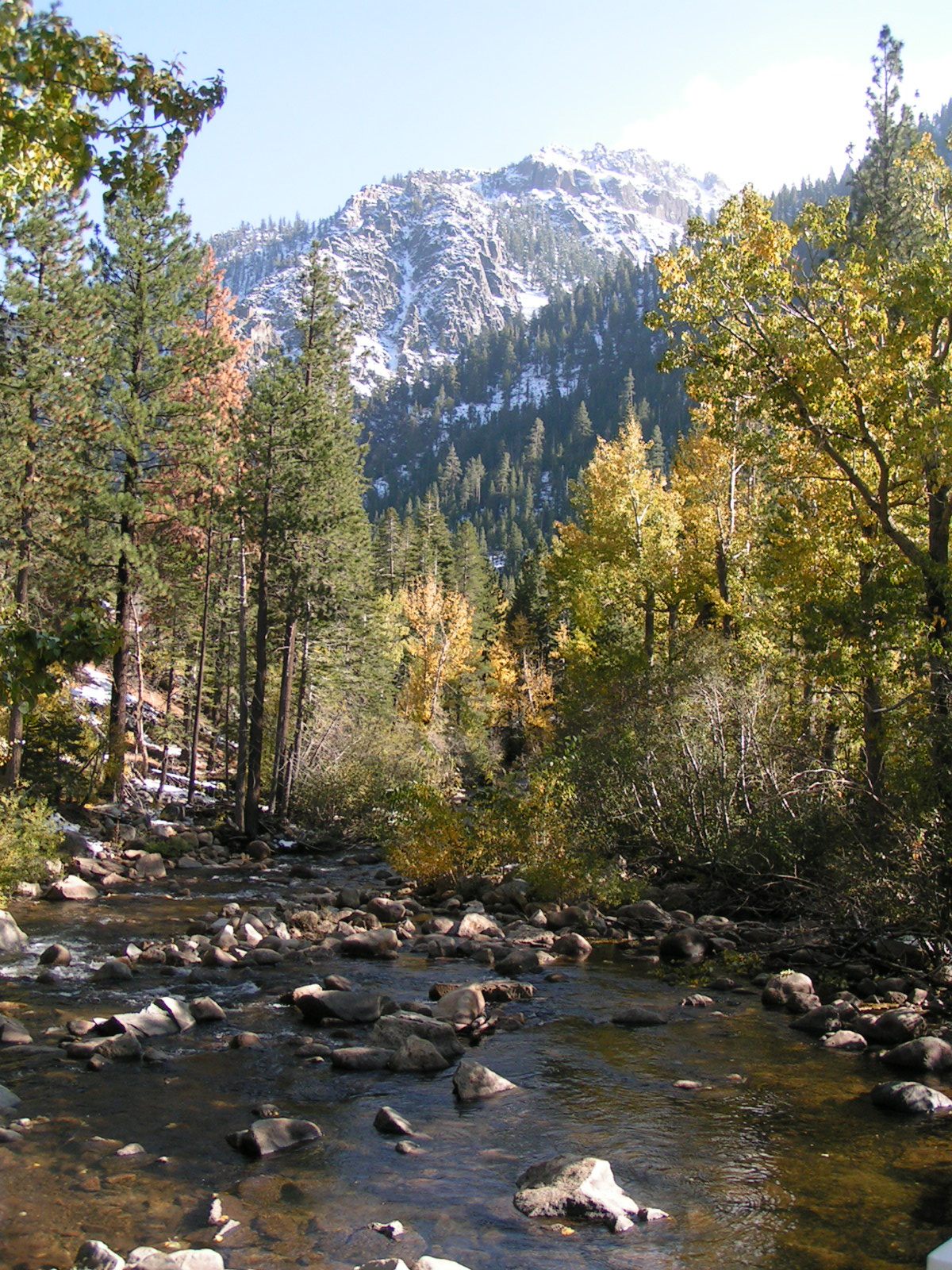
West Fork of the Carson River, just east of Hope Valley in Alpine County, California

The Truckee River, which drains the Lake Tahoe basin and Donner Lake, and the Carson River, which drains Hope Valley and adjacent mountains, are two major rivers that flow eastward out of the Sierra Nevada into the Great Basin and are only about 40 miles (64 km) from the end of the Humboldt. The Truckee River terminates in Pyramid Lake with a salinity approximately 1/6 that of sea water and supports several species of fish. The Carson River disappears into another alkali-laden marsh called the Carson Sink. All California Trail emigrants would have to cross the Forty Mile Desert to get to either river. Before crossing the Forty Mile Desert, the California main trail splits with one branch going towards the Truckee River Route (or Truckee Trail) (est. 1844) going roughly almost due west where Interstate 80 goes today towards the site of modern-day Wadsworth, Nevada. The Truckee was called the Salmon-Trout River on Fremont's 1848 map of the area. The Carson Trail branch (est. 1848) went roughly from today's I-80 and U.S. Highway 95 junction to modern day Fallon, Nevada, (near Rag Town) southwest across Forty Mile Desert to the Carson River.

The Forty Mile Desert was a barren stretch of waterless alkali wasteland that stretched from Humboldt Bar to both the Carson and Truckee rivers and beyond. The desert covered an area of over 70 by 150 miles (110 by 240 km), forming a fire box: its loose, white, salt-covered sands and baked alkali clay wastes reflected the sun's heat onto the stumbling travelers and animals. What few plants there are typically covered with thorns and live low to the ground.

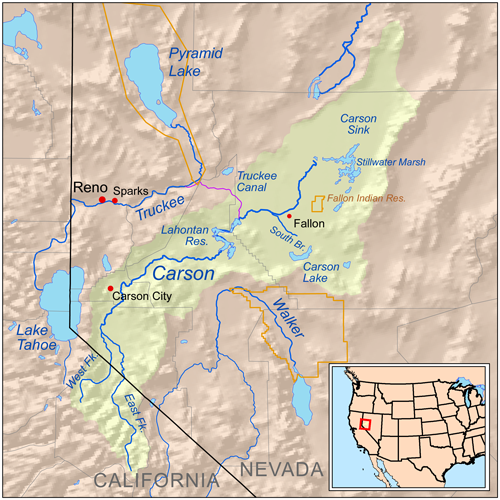
Map of the Carson, Truckee, Humboldt River drainage system western Nevada

The annual rainfall in the Forty mile desert is only 5 inches (13 cm) It was one of the most dreaded sections of the California Trail, as emigrants reached it just when they were often weak, tired, and nearly out of food. They were also often suffering from scurvy, and their animals and equipment were often worn out. They were about 150 miles (240 km) from the end of the 2,000 miles (3,200 km) trail and had been traveling on the trail from four to six months. For many emigrants, Forty Mile Desert was the end of their trail. Most emigrants got there in late August through early October—one of the hottest, driest times of the year. If possible, they traveled the desert by night because of the great heat, but it often took over a day and a night to traverse. About halfway across the desert on the Truckee Trail, they came to a foul tasting hot springs (now a thermal power plant), but its water was usually too hot for even very thirsty animals to consume. Many dead animals were concentrated at and in these "bad" water springs—often preventing access to them. Water had to be pooled off and allowed to cool before it could be used by man or beast. The trail on the last 8 miles (13 km) the alkali flats gave way to soft alkali laden sand, six to ten inches (15–25 cm) deep and very hard for the animals to pull the wagons through. The ground was littered with the debris of goods, abandoned wagons and dead and dying animals that had all been discarded in a desperate attempt by the pioneers to make it all the way across. Often a wagon would be abandoned and the team would be unhooked and taken on alone to get water. After drinking their fill of fresh water and recuperating on the other side, many would go back and retrieve their wagon—others simply abandoned them there. Many animals (and people) died on this crossing. A count made in 1850 showed these appalling statistics for Forty Mile Desert: 1,061 dead mules, about 5,000 dead horses, 3,750 dead cattle and oxen, and 953 emigrant graves.

The main route of the California Trail until 1848 is approximated by modern Nevada State Route 233 in eastern Nevada and Interstate 80 in central and western Nevada. The section of the trail from Wells, Nevada, to City of Rocks in Idaho can be approximated by starting at Wells, going north on US Route 93 to Wilkins, Nevada, and then turning onto a gravel county road 765 (Wilkins Montello Rd), that goes from Wilkins to the Goose Creek Road that goes through Nevada and back into Idaho—not advised for winter or spring use.

== Crossing the Sierra Nevada ==
The high, rugged Carson Range and Sierra Nevada mountains on the eastern California border were the final obstacles that had to be overcome before westbound travelers could proceed. The Sierra Nevada comprise a large block of weather-worn granite tilted towards the west. They extend about 400 miles (640 km) from near the Fandango Pass in the north to the Tehachapi Pass in the south. The western slopes are scarred by glacier and river carved canyons but slope much more gradually west taking about 70 miles (110 km) to fall from their rugged over 7,000 feet (2,100 m) crests to the about 25 feet (7.6 m) elevation of the Central Valley. The even more rugged glacier and river scarred eastern slopes are typically much more precipitous, rising to the rugged Sierra crest from their about 4,000 feet (1,200 m) base in the Great Basin in many places in less than 10 miles (16 km).

Precipitation in the Sierra Nevada flows to the Pacific Ocean if it falls on the western slope of the range. If precipitation falls on the eastern side of the Sierra crest it flows into the Great Basin where it evaporates, sinks underground or flows into lakes or sinks (mostly saline). These sinks are often dry alkali laden flats late in the year. The eastern side lies in a rain shadow getting much less rain than the western side. Creeks, streams, or rivers originating east of the Sierra crest find no outlet to either the Gulf of Mexico or the Pacific Ocean. (The water piped over the Sierra to Los Angeles is the only exception.)

A second smaller but yet significant block of weather worn granite formed the Carson Range of mountains located east of today's Lake Tahoe, between the two ranges. From the Humboldt River Route, first the Carson Range and then the Sierra would have to be passed to get to western California. Even today there are only about nine roads that go over the Sierra and about half of these may be closed in winter.

=== Truckee Trail ===
The Truckee Trail (established 1844 by the Stephens–Townsend–Murphy Party) over the Sierra Nevada took about 50 miles (80 km) to cross Forty Mile Desert but it did have a hot springs in about the middle that could be consumed if given time to cool. After hitting the Truckee River just as it turned almost due north towards Pyramid Lake near today's Wadsworth, Nevada, the emigrants had crossed the dreaded Forty Mile Desert. The emigrants blessed the Truckee's cool and sweet tasting water, fresh grass and the cool shade from the first trees (cottonwoods) the emigrants had seen in hundreds of miles. The travelers often rested themselves and their animals for a few days before proceeding. Real shade, grass for their animals and no more bitter, soapy-tasting Humboldt River water were much appreciated. The Truckee Trail followed the Truckee River past present day Reno, Nevada (then called Big Meadows) and went west until they encountered Truckee River Canyon near the present Nevada-California border. This canyon was one of the paths across the Carson Range of mountains. This steep, narrow, rock and cold water filled canyon could be traversed by wagons but required about 27 crossings of the cold Truckee River and much prying and shoving to get wagons and teams over the rocks to proceed up the canyon.

In 1845, Caleb Greenwood and his three sons developed a new route that by-passed the rough and rugged trail up the Truckee River Canyon by leaving the river near the present town of Verdi, Nevada and following a ravine northwest over a 6,200 feet (1,900 m) pass across the Carson Range (followed today by the Henness Pass Road) and down to Dog Valley and from there southwest down through the present Stampede and Prosser Creek Reservoirs before rejoining the Truckee trail near today's Truckee, California. This was about ten miles (16 km) longer route but it avoided most of the continual crossings of the rock filled Truckee River and became the main route for the Truckee Trail. Initially, the trail passed to the north of Lake Tahoe and then followed Donner Creek to the north side of Donner Lake before ascending the precipitous climb north of the lake to Donner Pass.

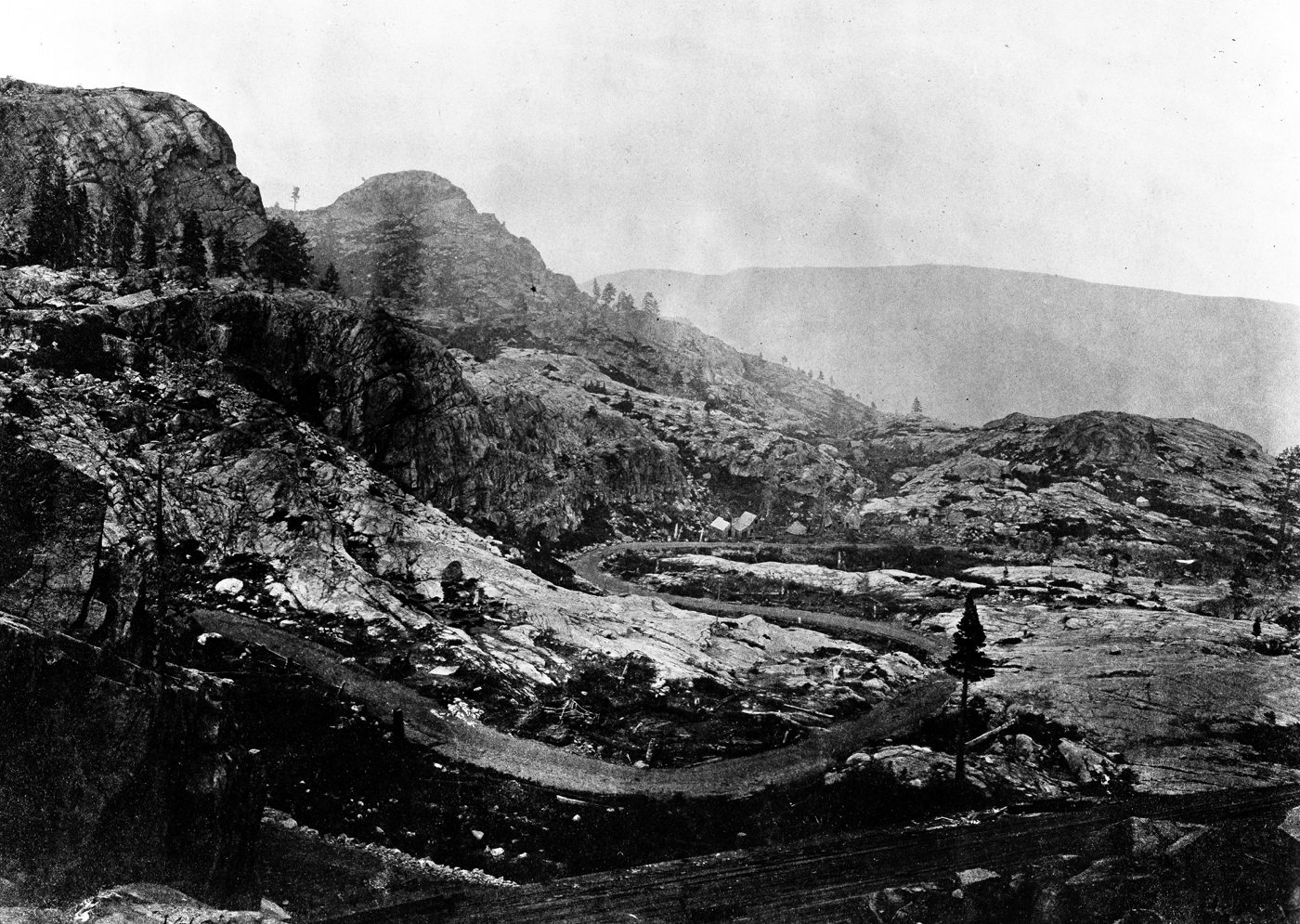
Donner Pass in the 1870s showing Dutch Flat wagon route improvements—made by Central Pacific Railroad

There were several Truckee routes over the Sierra here over time but nearly all required the wagons to be disassembled and hoisted straight up various cliffs using multiple teams to get the wagon parts and goods to the top. Some cliffs were ascended by tilting tall fallen trees against the cliffs and using multiple teams to pull the wagons up the improvised steep ramps. All routes required using multiple teams to get the wagons to the top and differing amounts of wagon dis-assembly. The trail initially crossed the Sierra crest through 7,000 feet (2,100 m) Donner Pass.

From Donner summit, the trail then proceeded on a rugged cliff and rock-strewn path down the South Fork of the Yuba River—fed by an alpine lake. The first resting spot after the pass for many was beautiful Summit Valley (now mostly covered by Lake Van Norden reservoir) a few miles from the summit.

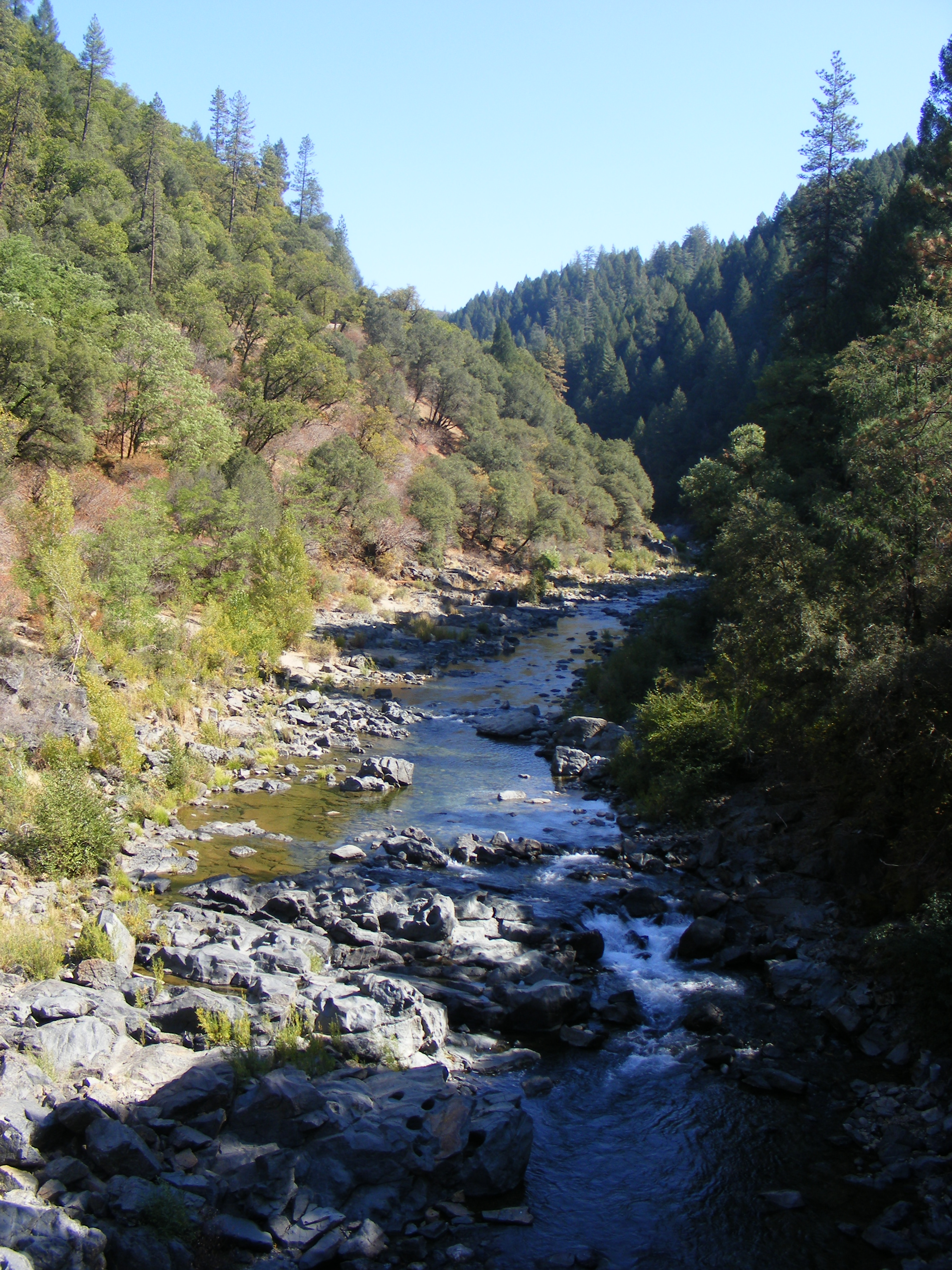
A view of the South Fork of the Yuba River from the North Bloomfield Road bridge.

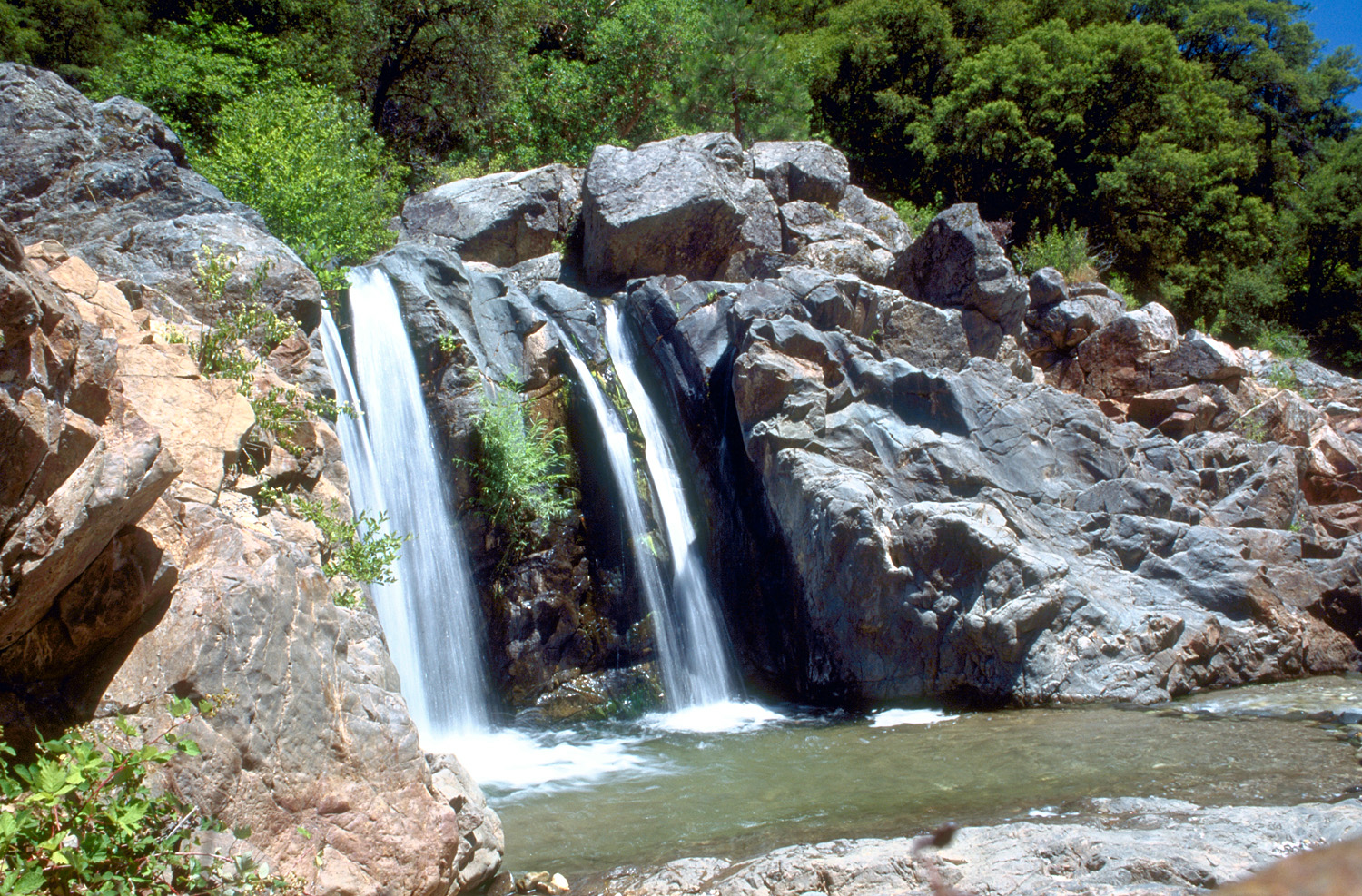
A waterfall on the South Fork Yuba River in South Yuba River State Park

The trail down the western slope of the Sierra from Donner pass had enormous granite boulders and numerous rocky outcrops and steep slopes before passing through Emigrant Gap (California). Here a Historical marker on Interstate 80 reads: "The spring of 1845 saw the first covered wagons surmount the Sierra Nevada. They left the valley, ascended to the ridge, and turned westward to old Emigrant Gap, where they were lowered their wagons by ropes to the floor of Bear River (Feather River tributary) Valley. Hundreds of wagons followed before, during, and after the gold rush. This was a hazardous portion of the overland emigrant trail." After getting down off the ridge most emigrants stayed at Bear Valley to rest themselves and their teams and recover before traveling the approximate 70 miles (110 km) remaining to Sutter's Fort. This combination of a very steep and difficult ascent and a sharp difficult descent into Bear Valley on a route that terminated far from the gold strike regions all combined to make the Truckee Trail little used after about 1849 when the Carson Trail was developed. The main route quickly became variations of the Carson Trail which was rough but not as difficult as the Truckee Trail and terminated in the main gold digging regions around Placerville, California.

After being nearly abandoned, several branches of the Truckee Trail were eventually developed in the early 1860s for freight wagons and emigrants going both ways on the California trail. To be more useful the Truckee Trail needed extensive and expensive work spent on it. The route of the Truckee trail was chosen as the "best" way to get a railroad over the Sierra. In 1863 the Central Pacific Railroad put about 300 men to work on the trail and spent over $300,000 (~$5.98 million in 2024) working on a new toll road roughly following the original Truckee route with several new upgrades. In 1864, the CPRR opened the Dutch Flat Donner Lake Toll Wagon Road (DFDLWR) to earn money hauling freight to Nevada while also supplying their railroad workers building the First transcontinental railroad from Dutch Flat California over the Donner summit and on to what today is Verdi, Nevada. The freight going to the gold and silver strikes in Nevada at the Comstock Lode were calculated to pay about $13,000,000 per year in wagon tolls—a fraction of this was well worth pursuing. One branch of the original Lincoln Highway over Donner summit built in about 1925 climbed the eastern Sierra to Donner Pass with multiple steep switchbacks. Today, the part of Interstate 80 in California and Nevada from 40 Mile Desert, Truckee River, Donner Pass, Sacramento very roughly approximates the original Truckee Trail route.

=== Roller Pass on the Truckee Route ===
Starting in about 1846, the Joseph Aram party found an alternate route on the south side of Donner Lake. Their route ran past the future town of Truckee, California up Coldstream Canyon south of Donner Lake to a 7,800 feet (2,400 m) saddle between Mt. Judah and Mt. Lincoln, about two miles (3.2 km) south of Donner's pass. Here the final climb was up over the somewhat higher but less precipitous Roller Pass. The oxen were taken to the top where they could pull on more or less level ground and about 400 feet (120 m) of chain was let down to a wagon and twelve or more yoke of oxen then pulled the wagon up the final steep (about 30 degree) slope. To minimize friction on the chain it ran over round logs (rollers) put at the top.(Roller Pass Truckee Trail Map) By not requiring dis-assembly and allowing the wagon to stay packed this was a much faster way to the top but was still tortuously slow taking two to three days or longer to get to the top with wagon, people, animals and goods. In about 1848 or 1849 a large group of pioneers cut a switchback trail over the final steep section of Roller Pass, eliminating the need for rollers and chains to get over Roller Pass. From the top of the pass all the pioneers could see was a rugged mountain slope headed west that would require almost 80 miles (130 km) more of strenuous and dangerous effort to get to their goals.

=== Nevada City Road ===
Branching off the Truckee Trail was the Nevada City Road (est 1850) to Nevada City. This 25 miles (40 km) cutoff is closely followed today by California State Route 20 from Emigrant Gap on Interstate 80 to Nevada City, California. Portions of the Nevada City Trail are evident at the top of Coyote Street, and North Bloomfield Road, just north of Nevada City. Plaques can be found where these roads meet the top of Harmony Ridge, as this was the ridge used to descend from the High Sierra, to the foothills of California.

=== Auburn Emigrant Road ===
The Auburn Emigrant Road (1852) from the Truckee trail to Auburn was established to bring emigrants to the new gold diggings at Auburn, California. Its thought to have extended from roughly present day Nevada City, California, roughly the end of the Truckee Trail, to Auburn. California State Route 49 from Auburn to Nevada City approximates this path. Later toll roads would be built along the rough pack trail from Auburn to Emigrant Gap (California) where Interstate 80 and the Central Pacific Railroad would later go. In 1852 Auburn was reachable by wagons from Sacramento.

=== Henness Pass Road ===
The Henness Pass Road (est. 1850) was an 80-mile (130 km) trail over the Sierra from today's Verdi, Nevada (Dog Valley) to Camptonville and Marysville, California. The route was developed as a wagon toll route by Patrick Henness starting in about 1850. The Henness Pass Road was located about 15 miles (24 km) north of the Truckee trail. The route went from The Truckee Trail in Dog Valley (near today's Verdi, Nevada) up the Little Truckee River to Webber Lake to the summit, through 6,920-foot (2,110 m) Henness Pass, along the ridge dividing the North and Middle Yuba Rivers and into Camptonville and Marysville. After extensive road work, paid for in part by Marysville, California commercial interests, freight could be shipped by steamboat to Marysville and picked up there for shipment over the Sierra. After 1860, extensions went southward to Carson City, Nevada, and on to the Comstock Lode in Virginia City, Nevada. Beginning in 1860 and continuing for some nine years, the road underwent major improvements, becoming one of the busiest trans-Sierra trails being favored by teamsters and stage drivers over the Placerville Route (Johnson Cutoff) because of its lower elevations, easier grades, and access to ship cargo. Many summer camps and relay stations were created along the route at roughly seven to ten-mile (16 km) intervals to accommodate oxen, horse and mule-powered wagons. In busy times the wagons traveled all day, filling the road, and the six or so stages traveled at night. The route was given up by most teamsters when the Central Pacific Railroad and Virginia and Truckee Railroad were completed in 1869, and it became cheaper and easier to ship freight by the railroad(s). People in Virginia City reported a 20–50% lower cost for supplies when the railroads were put in. Today the Henness wagon road is a mostly gravel U.S. Forest Service road called the Henness Pass Road from Verdi Nevada to Camptonville, California.

=== Beckwourth Trail ===
The Beckwourth Trail (est. 1850 by James Beckwourth) left the Truckee River Route at Truckee Meadows (now the site of Sparks, Nevada) and proceeded north along roughly the route of Stanford Way to Wedekind Road to U.S. Route 395 before crossing the Sierra on what is now California State Route 70 at 5,221 feet (1,591 m) Beckwourth Pass. After crossing the pass, the trail passed west along the ridge tops (avoiding Feather River Canyon) through present day Plumas, Butte and Yuba counties into California's Central Valley, finally terminating at Marysville. The Oroville-Quincy Highway (California State Route 162) and California State Route 70 from Quincy to Highway 395 in general follow the path of the original Beckwourth Trail.

=== Carson Trail ===
The much used Carson Trail (est. 1848) (also called Mormon Emigrant Trail) crossed Forty Mile Desert by leaving the Humboldt Sink and skirting the western edge of the Carson Sink and hit the Carson River near modern-day Fallon, Nevada. The Carson Trail was named after the Carson River, which was in turn named after Kit Carson, scout for John Charles Fremont who had guided the Fremont party over the Sierra through what was subsequently called Carson Pass in February 1844. The trail across the Forty Mile Desert had the usual 6–12 inches (15–30 centimetres) of loose sand that made traversing the desert very hard for the often tired and worn out draft animals. The Forty Mile Desert had water in about the middle, Salt Creek, but it was poisonous to drink. The trail through the desert was soon cluttered with discarded supplies, thousands of dead and dying animals, abandoned wagons, and hundreds of emigrant graves. Some estimated that only about half the wagons that started the trip across Forty Mile Desert got to the other side.

The Carson Trail was initially developed by about 45 discharged members of the Mormon Battalion. They, together with one woman, were driving 17 wagons and about 300 head of horse and cattle east to Salt Lake City in 1848. The wagons were veterans of the 1846 or 1847 emigration as California had at that time no facilities for building anything besides simple solid wheeled ox carts. They followed Iron Mountain Ridge southeast of what is now Placerville, California (there were essentially no settlements east of Sutter's Fort in 1848) before hitting Tragedy Spring near Silver Lake. Here they found three of their scouts murdered. The unknown culprits were believed to have been Native Americans. From there the Mormon group ascended to 9,400 feet (2,900 m) at West Pass and then dropped down to Caples Lake. From there they went through Carson Pass, elevation 8,574 feet (2,613 m). The only way down to the valley below was very steep ridge requiring many changes in direction with ropes and chains before they reached Red Lake at the head of Hope Valley. To get across the Carson Range of mountains the trail then followed the Carson River, traveling about six miles (9.7 km) in a very rough stretch of the Carson River canyon. The canyon was filled with boulders and rocks that had often fallen over a thousand feet into the canyon carved by the river through the Carson Range. In some places the canyon had to be widened enough for wagons to pass and impassable boulders removed by the Mormons headed east. They found that if they started a fire (driftwood was easily available) on boulders or impassably narrow canyon walls the hot rocks became easily breakable when doused with cold water and hit by picks and shovels. After several applications of fire, water and industrious pick use, the parts of the trail that were formerly impassable were opened up. In about 1853, the road through the canyon was converted intermittently to a toll road and made much easier to use when even more large boulders were removed and two permanent bridges were constructed.

Travelers heading west in 1848 and later, crossed Forty Mile Desert, then followed the trail blazed by the Mormons in 1848 up the Carson River valley from what is now Fallon, Nevada, in 1850 the town was called "Ragtown". Then, to get over the Carson Range, it was a very rough road through Carson River Canyon where the wagons had to be wrestled over the boulders by ropes, pry bars, levers and a few improvised bridges before the wagon trains finally entered beautiful 7,100 feet (2,200 m) Hope Valley. Westward travelers from Hope Valley had to climb a steep, rocky and tortuous path over the back wall of a glacier carved cirque to reach Carson Pass. The section of trail at the end of Hope Valley near Red Lake is called "The Devil's Ladder" where the trail has to climb over 700 feet (210 m) of very steep mountain in the final half mile (1 km). Today, a hiker's careful eye can still find notches, grooves and rust marks left by iron rimmed wagon wheels. Nearby, trees scarred by ropes, chains and pulleys used to haul the heavy wagons up the precipitous slope, can be seen. Travelers could get to the top of the pass in about one day of hard work, an acceptable trade-off for many emigrants. The trail crossed the Sierra Crest through 8,574 feet (2,613 m) Carson Pass.

At that time, the trail forward was blocked by the Carson Spur, a sharp ridge not passable by wagons. To proceed, the Carson Trail had to follow the path blazed by the Mormons and make a sharp turn south at what is now Caples Lake (reservoir) and ascend 9,400 feet (2,900 m) West Pass before finally making it over the Sierra Crest. The half day path up over West Pass was easy compared to the climb to Carson Pass and was used by thousands of wagons from 1848 to 1863. The Carson Trail was a straightforward push to Placerville and the heart of the gold country and was a main route for emigrants for many years. A better route variation was finally blasted out of the face of the cliffs at Carson Spur in 1863 by the Amador and Nevada Wagon Road—a toll road around Carson Spur. Over time the Carson Trail developed many branches and toll roads for freight wagons, emigrants and miners going both ways over the Sierra.

One of the major drawbacks of the Carson Trail was its elevation, with substantial sections of the trail over 8,000 feet (2,400 m), where snow often covered it from late fall well into the spring season. The Placerville route (Johnson Cutoff) became the preferred trail, as it was lower and extensively improved. It could be used much of the winter season for at least horse travel.

The present highway route—California State Route 88 follows much of the original Carson Trail route from the California/Nevada border for 38 miles to Mormon-Emigrant Trail/Iron Mountain Road, which goes to Pollock Pines, California, and from there on to Placerville, California. The current road avoids the highest section over West Pass by crossing the Carson Spur. Kirkwood Mountain Resort and ski area now occupies some of the higher parts of the original Carson Trail.

==== Johnson Cutoff ====
The Johnson Cutoff (1850–51) road (also called Placerville Route, Lake Tahoe Route and Day Route) from Carson City, Nevada, to Placerville (then called Hangtown) used part of the Carson Trail to about present day Carson City. This cutoff was developed by John Calhoun Johnson of Placerville in about 1850–51. Leaving the future site of Carson City, the cutoff passed over the Carson Range by following Cold Creek (via Kings Canyon Road) and passing over 7,150 feet (2,180 m) Spooner Summit (now used by U.S. Route 50). Once near Lake Tahoe it was forced to climb some further steep ridges by rocky spurs jutting into the lake and swampy ground (modern U.S. Highway 50 corrects both these problems). After getting to the southern end of the lake, the trail veered west near Echo Lake and climbing steeply made it over the Sierra on 7,400 feet (2,300 m) Echo Summit (Johnson's Pass). The steep descent from Johnson's Pass brought the trail down to Slippery Ford on the South Fork American River. From there, Johnson's Cutoff headed westward following the river from Strawberry to today's Kyburz, California, before crossing to its north side and ascending about 1,400 feet (430 m) to Peavine Ridge and following its crest to get around a rocky stretch of the river. After descending Peavine ridge the trail forded the South Fork of the American River near Pacific House. From about today's Pollock Pines, California it followed the ridge line on the south side of the river to Placerville. Johnson's route became a serious competitor as the main route over the Sierra. This route, with considerable up grades and modifications, eventually became one of the main all-season routes over the Sierra since it could be kept open at least intermittently in the winter.

In 1855, the California Legislature passed An Act to Construct a Wagon Road over the Sierra Nevada Mountains and appropriated $100,005 (equivalent to approximately $2.66 million in 2024 dollars) for its implementation. Sherman Day, a part-time California State Senator was appointed to survey the possible routes. After extensive searches, he recommended the Placerville route (Johnson's Cutoff) as the best prospect and surveyed an improved route. The California Supreme Court ruled in 1856 that the law was unconstitutional since it violated the state Constitution's allowable $300,000 (~$8.15 million in 2024) debt limit without public vote. Discouraged but not defeated, road proponents got El-Dorado, Sacramento and Yolo counties to kick in $50,000 for road construction. Contracts were let and they got a new bridge across the South Fork American River ($11,300); a new sidehill road along Peavine ridge that was only 100 to 500 feet (30 to 152 m) above the river and avoided the sharp ascents and descents there and extensive work on a new road up to Johnson's Summit (Echo Summit) and another less precipitous road down to Lake Valley. This was the first route over the Sierra on which extensive, public financed, improvements were made. The new route was christened the Day Route. Winter and its attendant runoffs raised havoc with the road and in spring 1860, when the mobs were trying to get to Virginia City, Nevada, and the new Comstock Lode strike, it was reported as a barely passably trail in places (April 1860). To get supplies to Virginia City, Nevada, and the Comstock area after 1860, the road was extensively improved as a toll road to the mines in Virginia City, Nevada. It is now followed roughly by U.S. Highway 50.

In 1860–61, the Pony Express used Daggetts Pass and Johnson's cutoff route to deliver their mail—even in the winter.

==== Luther Pass Trail ====
The Luther Pass Trail (1854) was established to connect the Carson River Canyon road with the Johnson Cutoff (Placerville Road or Lake Tahoe Road). Luther Pass (present CA SR 89) joined the older emigrant route northeast of Carson Pass through Carson River Canyon rather than following the trails along Lake Tahoe. Going East after descending from Echo Summit and getting to the south end of Lake Valley, it headed southeast over 7,740 feet (2.36 km) Luther Pass into Hope Valley where it connected with the main Carson Trail through Carson River canyon to get over the Carson Range.

==== Daggett Pass ====
Branching off the Johnson's Cutoff (Placerville Road) was about 10 miles (16 km) Daggett Pass toll road (Georgetown Pack Trail) (est. abt 1850). This route was developed as a toll road to get across the Carson Range of mountains. Going east it leaves The Placerville Route near what is now Stateline, Nevada (near South Lake Tahoe) and progresses up Kingsbury Grade to 7,330 feet (2.23 km) Daggett Pass and on down the Kingsbury Grade to Carson Valley. After 1859 and the discovery of gold and silver in the Comstock Lode, this road was extensively improved and used by teamsters going to Virginia City, Nevada, as it cut about 15 miles (24 km) off the usual road through Carson River Canyon. Today Nevada State Route 207 closely approximates this road.

==== Grizzly Flat Road ====
The Grizzly Flat Road (1852) to Grizzly Flat & Placerville was an extension of the Carson trail that went down the middle fork of the Consumes River to what was then a busy gold diggings at Grizzly Flat—located about 35 miles (56 km) east of Placerville.

==== Volcano Road ====
The Volcano Road (1852) off the Carson Trail was made in 1852 when Amador County and Stockton merchants paid a contractor to construct a road from Corral Flat on what is now the Carson Trail (California State Route 88) to Volcano, California. Today the cutoff is approximately followed off SR 88 by the Fiddletown Silver Lake Road, Shake Ridge Road And Ram's Horn Grade.

==== Big Tree Road ====
Big Tree Road & Ebbetts Pass Road (est. about 1851–1862) from the gold mining towns of Murphys, California & Stockton, California to gold and silver mining towns/mines near Markleeville in eastern California and western Nevada. It approximates the present California State Route 4 route over 8,730 feet (2,660 m) Ebbetts Pass. Descriptions of the pass match those used by Jedediah Smith in the late spring of 1827 when leaving California, as well as the pass used by John Bidwell and the Bartleson–Bidwell Party on their emigration to California in 1841.

Originally a free pack trail route when first used in about 1851 by "Major" John Ebbetts, it was improved to a wagon road and became a toll road to silver mining towns in eastern California and western Nevada from 1864 through 1910, and then a free county road in 1911. It was used by very few emigrants to California.

The road reverted to a free county road in 1911 and was accepted into the California State Highway system in 1926 as California State Route 4. It was not until the early 1950s that the road over Monitor Pass to U.S. Route 395 was completed, connecting the eastern terminus of State Route 4 to U.S. Route 395 via California State Route 89 near the community of Topaz, California. Today's Ebbetts Pass National Scenic Byway is a very scenic drive but one of the least traveled highways across the Sierra Nevada Mountains. It is anchored at either end by two state parks—Calaveras Big Trees State Park and Grover Hot Springs State Park. It passes through the Stanislaus and Humboldt-Toiyabe National Forests. Today's Ebbetts Pass road, SR 4, has an extensive section of highway that is less than two lanes wide with no dividing line. It also has some very steep sections, particularly on the eastern Sierra slopes, with several sharp hairpin corners.

Both the Carson River and Truckee River trails eventually ended up at Sutter's Fort in Sacramento, California. In 1848 most emigrants developed and used this route. In 1849 about one-third of all emigrants used the Carson Trail with later years many more using it. Starting in 1848, many left the main trail to stay in a mining district(s) or town(s) that developed along or off the trail(s).

==== Sonora Road ====
In 1852, the Sonora Road was opened from the Carson Trail to Sonora, California, by the Clark-Skidmore Company. From the Humboldt Sink it crossed Forty Mile Desert to the Carson River and then went almost due south to the Walker River, which it followed to the Sierra before making the very steep (about 26 degrees in parts) and rugged ascent to 9,625 feet (2,934 m) Sonora Pass.

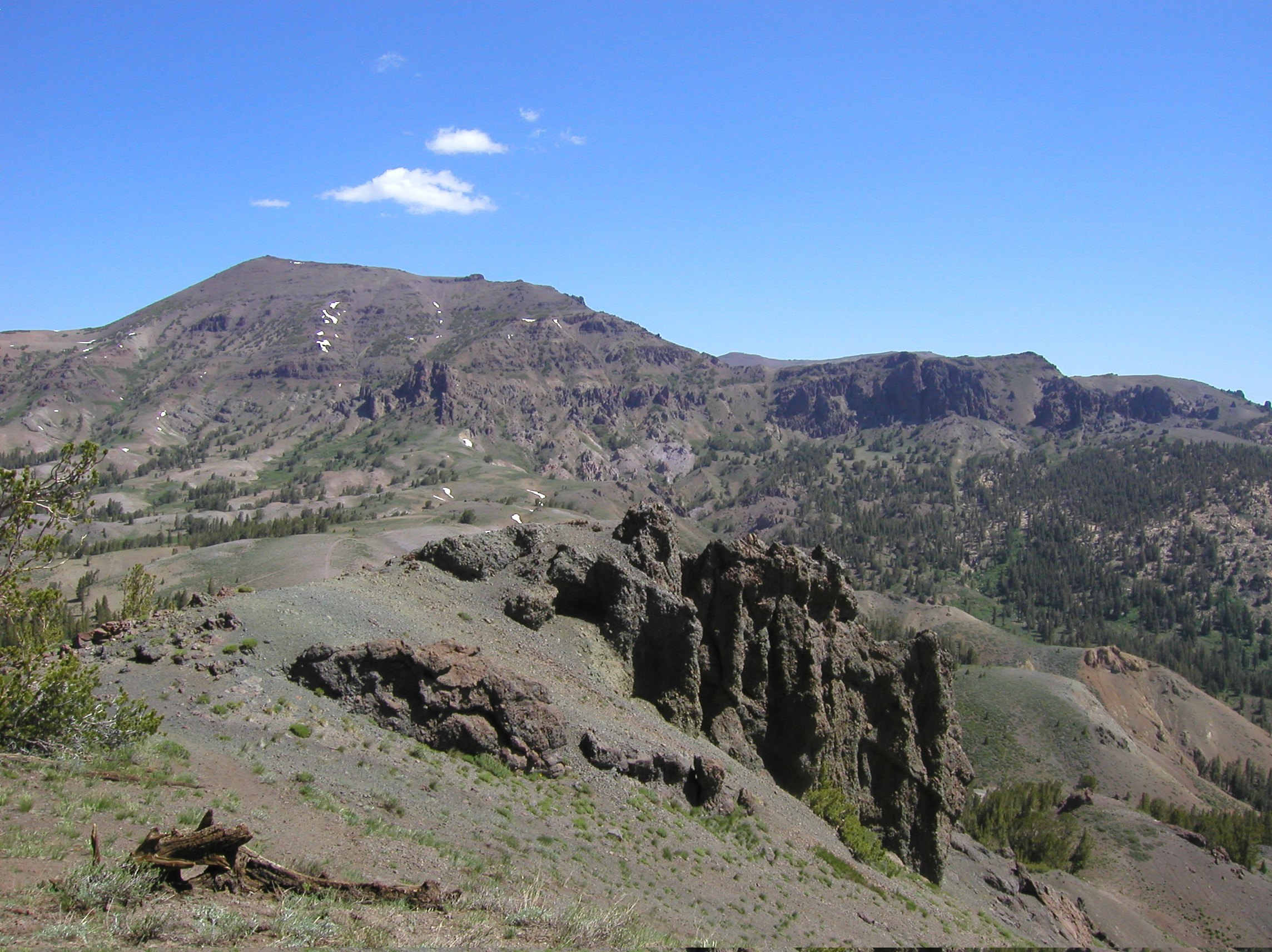
View of the Sierra Nevada range and Sonora Peak looking northward from Sonora Pass

From there the road drops down twisting forested mountain ridges to Sonora. This was the highest road developed across the Sierra—and still a very scenic drive. (modern Tioga Pass out of Yosemite National Park is slightly higher) California State Route 108 between Sonora and U.S. Highway 395 roughly approximates the route of the Sonora Road over the Sierra. This route was little used after about 1854.

=== Applegate–Lassen Cutoff ===
The Applegate–Lassen Cutoff or Applegate Trail (est. 1846–48) left the California Trail at Lassen Meadows, near the present-day Rye Patch Reservoir on the Humboldt River in Nevada. The trail headed northwest until it could pass north of the worst of the California Sierra Nevada mountains. The trail passed through Rabbithole Springs, crossed the Black Rock Desert and High Rock Canyon before finally (after nearly 100 miles (160 km) of desert travel) arriving at Surprise Valley and climbing steeply to go over 6,300 feet (1,900 m) Fandango Pass. From there, travelers faced a descent down a very steep hill to Fandango Valley on the shores of Goose Lake on the Oregon-California border. Just south of Goose Lake the combined Oregon-California trail split at Davis Creek. The Applegate Trail branch proceeded northwest into southeastern Oregon along the Lost River before turning almost due north roughly along the route of today's Interstate 5 to go the Willamette Valley in Oregon.

The California branch, the Lassen Cutoff (established in 1848 with a help from eager Oregon gold seekers), proceeded southwest through the Devil's Garden along the Pit River and passed east of Lassen Peak until it eventually swung west at present day Lake Almanor (reservoir) and arrived at Lassen's rancho near the Sacramento River. From there it followed the river south in the Central Valley (California) about 110 miles (180 km) to Sutter's Fort and the gold fields. This road was so rough that today in many places it can only be traveled by the occasional forest trail and hiking paths.

The Applegate–Lassen Cutoff was almost 150 miles (240 km) further than other routes and took roughly fifteen to thirty days of additional travel to get to Sutter's Fort, which was unknown to nearly all who initially took it. It avoided Forty Mile Desert and many of the high passes and difficult climbs of other routes, but it introduced some difficult desert crossings and had very limited grass and water. For most it was a very bad choice of routes. Much of the traffic on this alternate route in the early days was due to confusion, as enough travelers turned off on this route to make many of those following think wrongly that it was the main route. Most had dispensed with hiring guides who actually knew the trail by then and almost none had any written guides about the Applegate-Lassen Trail. Most did not realize for several days or even weeks they had made a wrong turn. It is estimated that in 1849 about 7,000 to 8,000 (about one-third of California trail travelers that year) inadvertently took this much longer trail and found that the earlier travelers and their animals had stripped the desert bare and set fires that had burned most available grass. There was almost no forage left for their animals, and they lost many hundreds of animals and suffered severe hardships and several deaths, as many ran out of supplies before rescue parties sent out from Sutter's Fort could reach them. By 1853, other faster, easier, and shorter routes had been worked out, and traffic on the Applegate-Lassen cutoff declined to a trickle.

=== Nobles Road ===
In 1851, William Nobles surveyed a shorter variation of the Applegate–Lassen trail. It was developed to make it easier to get to Shasta, California (which paid him $2,000) in the Central Valley and was first used in 1852. The route, called Noble's Road, left the main trail near Lasson's meadow (now Rye Patch Reservoir) in Nevada, and bypassed most of the large Applegate-Lassen loop north almost to Goose Lake (Oregon-California) on the Oregon-California border. This reasonably easy wagon route followed the Applegate-Lassen Trail to the Boiling Spring at Black Rock in Black Rock Desert and then went almost due west from there to Shasta, California, in the Central Valley via Smoke Creek Desert to present-day Honey Lake and present-day Susanville before passing North of Mt. Lassen and on to Shasta (near present-day Redding). The route today can be approximated by taking Nevada State Route 49 (Jungo Road) from Winnemucca, Nevada, to Gerlach, Nevada, and from there to Susanville via Smoke Creek Road. From there, California State Route 44 through Lassen Volcanic National Park to Redding approximates the rest of the trail. It depended upon springs for water, as there were no dependable creeks along most of the route. East of Mt. Lassen, it used part of Lassen's road in reverse over a distance of about 20 miles (32 km). In that section of trail, a traveler going to Shasta City might travel north passing another traveler going south to Sutter's Fort California.

In 1857, Congress appropriated $300,000 (~$7.94 million in 2024) for building a wagon road to California and to establish the Fort Kearny, South Pass and Honey Lake Wagon Road. Exactly why the road was to terminate at Honey Lake near Susanville is a legislative mystery, since very few went that way in 1857 or later. The road was built in response to pressure from California Congressmen who wanted a good road to California, preferably one that bypassed Forty Mile Desert. The first part of the route was surveyed by Frederick W. Lander working under William Magraw. In 1858, Lander guided several hundred workers who built the Landers Cutoff passing the Green River well north of the established ferries, over Thompson Pass into Star Valley Wyoming, and from there up Stump Creek and on to Fort Hall in Idaho. In 1860, Landers was instructed to find a new route north of the Humboldt. To help the emigrants leaving the main trail at Lassen's meadow and going to Honey Lake, Lander had two large reservoir tanks built at Rabbit Hole and Antelope Springs. These reservoirs helped Nobles Road keep its status as an emigrant trail, but only the few emigrants interested in going to Northern California used it.

=== California toll roads over the Sierra ===
Initially, the trails across the Sierra were improved only enough to make them barely passable. The main initial attraction for improved toll roads across the Sierra was Virginia City, Nevada and the Comstock Lode strike in the Washoe district of Nevada in 1859. This strike rapidly developed after about 1860 when they found out how potentially massive the gold and silver deposits there were. A good, easily traversed road was needed to haul in miners, other workers, supplies, etc., and road improvements and maintenance could be financed by the road tolls. The Comstock Lode mines would require millions of dollars of investment to buy and ship in thousands of tons of mining supplies, food and firewood to supply the mines. Almost no cities existed in Nevada then, and Virginia City would be Nevada's first major city. In addition, until the mills could be built, high grade ore was shipped to California for processing. The gold and silver ore there required developing a new massive industrial scale mining operation by multiple mines to get it out. New techniques would have to be developed to get the silver out, the Washoe process. New techniques were required to support the mines, which were often in weak ground. The square-set timber process ultimately used millions of board feet of lumber. Millions of gallons of water per day had to be pumped out of the mines usually by massive steam powered Cornish pumps, which ultimately had over 3,000 feet (910 m) long pumping rods that weighed over 1,500,000 pounds (680,000 kg) and used over 33 cords of wood fuel per day, each. In addition, the mine hoists and up to 75 mills were all run with steam engines, all using copious amounts of wood. Winter heating consumed more thousands of cords of wood. All these thousands of cords of firewood had to be freighted in. The heavy firewood and timber needs of the Comstock Lode strike lead to much of the Carson Range and part of the Sierra Nevada being extensively denuded of timber. As the mines developed they went into progressively hotter regions until they were mining in up to 130 degree Fahrenheit (55 degree Celsius) temperatures. To survive in these temperatures the miners used up tons of ice (frozen in the winter and hauled in) each day. The gold and silver found more than paid for the wages, development, lumbering and shipping costs. In the next twenty years, over $300,000,000 (in 1880 dollars) worth of gold (at about $20/oz.) and silver (at about $1.00/oz.) were extracted.

Starting in 1860, many emigrant trails over difficult terrain and streams were improved and replaced by toll roads and bridges built and financed by private entrepreneurs and some cities. Later, other strikes in western Nevada and eastern California would give impetus to new toll roads to a new mining town.

Initially, the two main toll roads over the Sierra that were improved and developed were the Henness Pass Route from Nevada City, California, to Virginia City, Nevada, and the Placerville Route, (also called Johnsons's Cutoff and the Tahoe Wagon Road) from Placerville, California, to Lake Tahoe and over the Carson range to Virginia City. The Placerville route would be the first route that could be kept at least partially open even in winter. The Henness Pass route was partially built by a $25,000 grant from Marysville and Nevada City. The Placerville route was somewhat shorter at about 100 miles (160 km) and had the additional advantage that freight could be shipped to Folsom, California, about 23 miles (37 km) out of Sacramento on the Sacramento Valley Railroad—built in 1856. This freight could then be transferred onto wagons that had good roads to Placerville and later clear to Virginia City. In their heyday from about 1861–1866, these roads had major improvements made at many thousands of dollars per road and paid the salaries of a small army of employees that worked on building and maintaining different sections of the road and the service centers located roughly every ten miles. A typical wage then was from $1.00 to $2.00/day for laborers, teamsters etc., with higher wages when men were scarce. The miners in Virginia City were paid the very high wage of $4.00/day. A team could be hired for a few dollars/day. The storm-induced and spring runoff gullies and ruts in the roads would have to be filled in, culverts installed, streams and canyons bridged, gravel hauled in to fill the soft spots in the road, rough spots evened out and road cuts made in the side hills to get around the hills. The only tools available to build and maintain roads then were hand tools: picks, shovels, crow bars, hoes, axes, wheelbarrows, hand saws, etc. This was aided by judicious use of black powder to eliminate really bad spots. The only power available was human, ox or mule pulled plows, wagons and mule powered dump carts. The railroads would be built with essentially the same tools. Every spring, extensive repairs costing additional thousands would be needed to repair the ravages of winter and the gully washing spring thaws.

During summer daylight hours, the roads were often packed for miles in busy spots with heavily laden wagons headed east and west usually pulled by up to ten mules. Wagons headed west were mostly empty, but some carried the literally tons of silver mined in the Washoe district (Virginia City) back to San Francisco. Passing spots were located frequently along the roads to allow two way traffic. The roughly 200 miles (320 km) round trip over the Henness Pass road or the Placerville Route could be done by freight wagons in about 16–18 days.

Mail and passenger stages usually went at night to avoid most of the slower (≈3 mph) wagon traffic. As counted in 1862, the average number of passengers carried each day on the Placerville Route's Pioneer Stage Company line with 12 coaches and 600 horses averaged about 37 passengers/day. Horses were changed at roughly every 10–20 mile intervals and the drivers often vied to make the fastest time. A typical stage trip took approximately 18 hours from Placerville to Virginia City with an 18-hour return. Holdups, stage wrecks and other accidents were an occasional occurrence on both routes. In 1864, stage receipts were estimated by newspapers of the time to be about $527,000 at $27.00 per passenger on the Placerville route. The Henness Pass road's California Stage Company and Nevada Stage Line carried somewhat fewer passengers. Both stage coach routes together were estimated by newspapers of the day to have gross receipts, including mail subsidies, of over $1,000,000 total in 1864 (~$16.3 million in 2024). The typical freight charges were about $120.00 to $160.00/ton (6–8 cents/pound) with am additional $20.00 to $30.00 toll charges/wagon. A Central Pacific Railroad agent (J. R. Atkins) estimated, after counting all Placerville toll road traffic in August and September 1862, that the freight charges to Virginia City over the Placerville route would have been about $5,000,000, (~$122 million in 2024) which delivered roughly 20,000,000 pounds (9,100,000 kg) of freight in eight weeks. Similar amounts presumable were shipped over the Henness pass route. In a given month during the busy season, over 2,000 wagons (sometimes up to three wagons were pulled by one team) and over 10,000 draft animals (mostly mules) per month were counted on the Placerville road alone in 1862. The Placerville Route and Henness Pass route even had sprinkler wagons that wetted down the road during daylight hours about every three hours to minimize dust and wear and tear on the road. There were 93 hotels, stage relay stations and lodging stations located along the Placerville Route with similar stations along the Henness Pass route located at roughly ten miles (16 km) intervals. The teamsters stayed at these locations at the end of each day's travel. The Placerville Route tried to stay open in winter to at least horse traffic and was only closed temporarily by winter storms. The Pony Express used this route in the summer and winter of 1860–61. The net profit per year from these toll roads was probably over $100,000/yr in 1862 (~$2.44 million in 2024) and increasing every year.

Competition arrived in July 1864 when the Central Pacific railroad entrepreneurs opened Dutch Flat and Donner Lake Wagon Road (DFDLWR) This route was opened over much of the route the new Central Pacific railroad would use over Donner Summit. This route followed much of the original Truckee Trail route with the major exception that its large work force could smooth and straighten the route and make major side hill cuts that built around many of the steep grades and over or through major obstacles. Below Dutch Flat where the original Truckee Trail diverged from modern roads to descend into a steep canyon and use the Bear River ridge to get around impassable terrain the Dutch Flat and Donner Lake Wagon Road (and the Central Pacific track) was cut around many of the sharp ridges that had prevented a wagon road there. Despite the Dutch Flat and Donner Lake Wagon Road name, the railhead would not actually reach Dutch Flat (about 60 miles (97 km) east of Sacramento) until July 4, 1866, as it was built over difficult terrain and required very heavy construction to reach Dutch Flat. Their toll road was built with a reported $200,000 (1864 dollars) investment and involved about 350 men and many teams of animals working for over ten months. Initially, the road extended from the railhead (then Newcastle, about 30 miles (48 km) east of Sacramento) over Donner summit to Verdi, Nevada, where it joined the road developed by the Henness Pass road to Virginia City, Nevada. After it was opened, this route was advertised by the California Stage Company to reach Virginia City in three hours less time (about 17 hours) than the Sacramento-Placerville Route and have lower grades and wider roads, (20 feet (6.1 m)), than the other routes. This new toll road was developed so the new railroad could earn money even as it was being built as well as supplying their own hefty transportation needs. As the railroad construction progressed over the Sierra, freight could be shipped to near the railhead then transferred to wagons that could use the new toll road to complete their journey. It slowly took over much of the shipping to Virginia City and the Washoe district as the railroad progressed over Donner Summit (December 1868) and into Truckee and beyond. Today's Interstate 80 goes over much of the same route and is the main transportation artery over the Sierra in northern California.

Tolls existed on nearly all Sierra trail crossings as improvements were made; but most other roads after the two (later three) main toll roads were developed, were relatively lightly used. A typical toll from Sacramento to Virginia City Nevada was about $25.00 to $30.00 round trip for a freight wagon carrying at least 2,000 pounds (910 kg) up to 6,000 pounds (2,700 kg) of cargo with additional tolls possible for additional animals over six (usually $1.50/animal) and some additional bridge tolls were also needed. Some teams had up to ten animals pulling up to three wagons trailered behind each other. Some counties and cities did help build some roads but mainly granted franchises so toll road operators could build and maintain roads and bridges with assurances of minimum competition and compensation. Some resented the toll charges, but the users of the road paid for the improvements and maintenance on the roads, and taxpayers of this era in general were very hesitant to pick up the very hefty cost of building and maintaining "free" roads.

Nearly all of the heavy wagon freighting and stage use over the Sierra ceased after the completion of the Central Pacific and Virginia Truckee railroads in 1869. The ongoing, massive needs for millions of board feet of Sierra timber and thousands of cords of firewood in the Comstock Lode mines and towns would be the single major exception, although they even built narrow gauge railroads to haul much of this. Stages and wagons were still needed and used for the many cities not serviced by the railroads and the stage and freight lines continued in business. The first "highway" established by the counties was the Placerville toll route that was bought by the counties and made a "free" (taxpayer financed) road in 1886. The first "highway" established by the state government was this same Placerville wagon road over the Sierra after it was bought by the state in 1896. This road eventually became U.S. Route 50.

Due to lack of use after 1869, most of the wagon roads across the Sierra were allowed to deteriorate until, by the early 20th century, many were again next to impassable to wagons. The railroad served nearly all trans-Sierra passenger and freight needs. The arrival of the automobile in the early 20th century revived the need for good Sierra roads. By 1910, only the Placerville route (now a state highway) was maintained well enough for car and truck traffic to get over the Sierra. The Truckee Trail that was modified and upgraded to the Dutch Flat and Donner Wagon Road over Donner summit had deteriorated so badly that the road had to be extensively rebuilt and relocated to become passable for cars or trucks. After extensive upgrades and modifications this road would become U.S. Route 40 and later Interstate 80.

=== Other traffic ===
Others besides emigrants were also using parts of the trail(s) for freighting, extensive livestock herding of cows, sheep and horses, stage lines, and briefly in 1860–61 the Pony Express. Traffic in the California-Nevada area was often two ways as the mines like the Comstock Lode (found in 1859) in Nevada and other gold and silver discoveries in eastern California, Nevada, Idaho and Montana needed supplies freighted out of California. The completion of the Panama Railroad in 1855, along with steamboats traveling to both the Pacific and Atlantic ports in Panama, made shipping people and supplies from Europe and the east coast into California, and from there to new gold and silver mining towns, inexpensive. New ranches and settlements located along the trail(s) also needed supplies freighted in. Gold and silver discoveries in Colorado often had their supplies shipped in from the east coast and midwest along parts of the various emigrant trails. Steamboats delivered supplies to Missouri River ports from not only both sites in the eastern United States, but also from Europe as New Orleans, Louisiana, and others allowed cheap and fast ship connections to Europe. Before the railroads came in, horse-, mule- or oxen-pulled freight wagons from either California or the midwest were the only way new supplies from the east, midwest and Europe could be dispersed throughout several states. Gold, silver, livestock, etc. were shipped back to Europe and the east coast to pay for these supplies.

Toll bridges and ferries were active at nearly all previously dangerous river crossings as the trail became not only safer but quicker. Stage coaches by changing teams at newly established stage stations about every ten to twenty miles (16 to 32 km) and traveling day and night, could make a transit from the Missouri River to California in 25 to 28 days. After 1861, telegraph relay stations and their crews joined these stage stations along much of the route. Forts and army patrols helped protect these various stations from Indian attacks throughout the U.S. Civil War period and later. Regular wagon trains that only had one team per wagon and stopped at night cut their transit time from about 160 days in 1849 to 120 days in 1860. The tolls on the various bridges, ferries and toll roads typically averaged about $30.00 per wagon by 1860. All these toll bridges, roads and ferries shortened the journey west by about 40 days and made it much safer as bad parts of the trail were improved and dangerous river crossings were done now by ferries and toll bridges that cost money but were much safer and faster. Nearly all improvements were financed by tolls on the various roads, bridges and ferries.

=== The Central Pacific, Union Pacific, and Virginia and Truckee Railroads ===
The ultimate competitor to the California Trail showed up in 1869 when the First transcontinental railroad was completed. The combined Central Pacific Railroad and Union Pacific Railroad carried traffic from the East into California, and the Virginia and Truckee Railroad carried traffic from Reno to Virginia City. The trip from Omaha, Nebraska, to California became faster, cheaper, and safer, with a typical trip taking only seven days and a $65 (economy) fare. Even before completion, sections of the railroad were used to haul freight and people around Nebraska, Wyoming, Utah, Nevada and California. The price of many goods imported from the east dropped by 20–50% as the much cheaper transportation costs were mostly passed on to the consumers. The California trail was used after 1869 by a few intrepid travelers, but it mostly reverted to local traffic traveling to towns or locations along the trail.
