= Caribou Mountain (Idaho) =

Mountain in Bonneville County, Idaho, United States

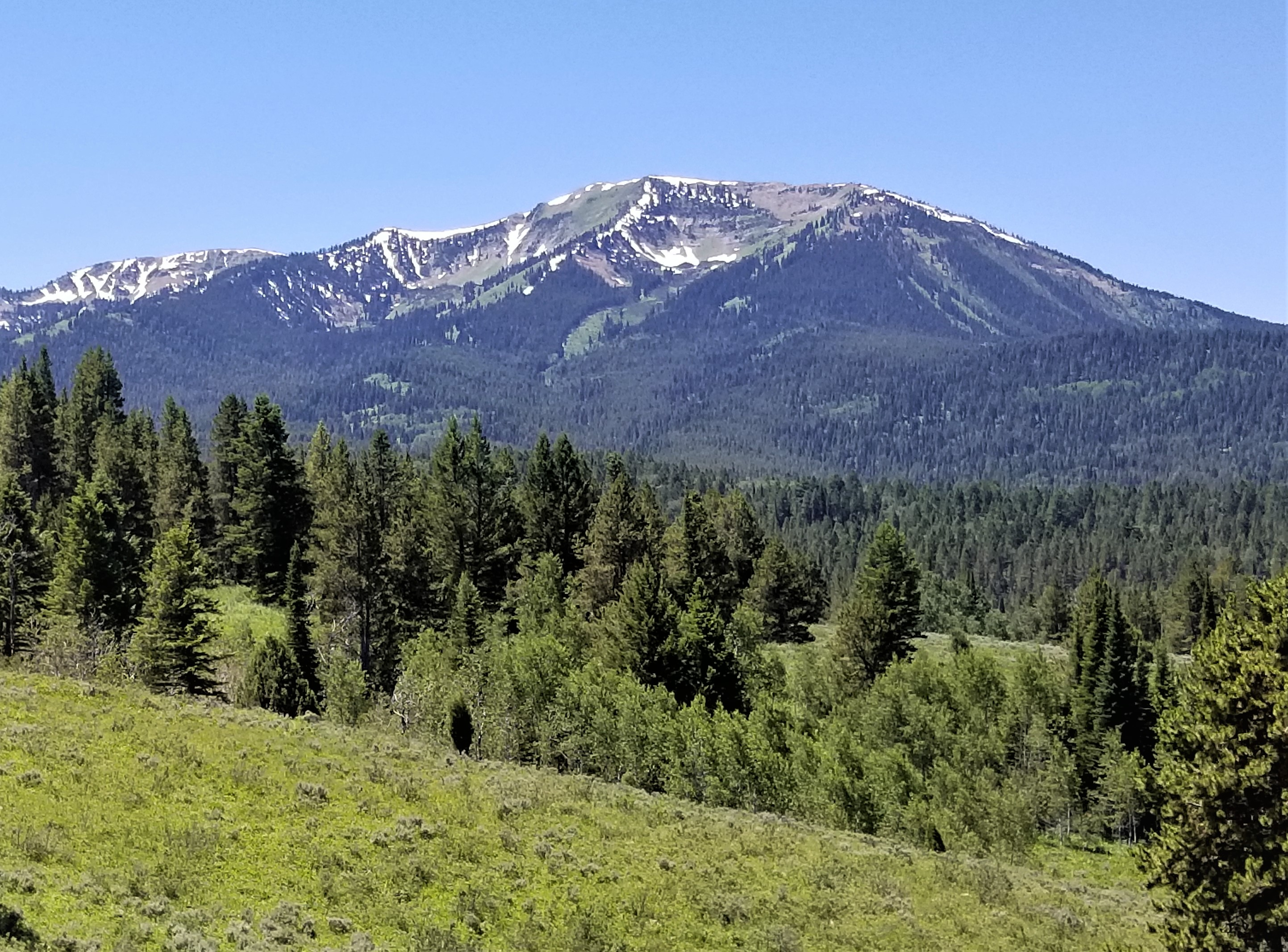
- Northeast aspect, June 2018

Highest point
- Elevation: 9,803 ft (2,988 m)
- Prominence: 3,093 ft (943 m)
- Parent peak: Meade Peak (9,957 ft)
- Isolation: 19.59 mi (31.53 km)
- Coordinates: 43°05′36″N 111°18′42″W

Geography
- Location within Idaho Location within the United States
- Location: Caribou–Targhee National Forest
- Country: United States of America
- State: Idaho
- County: Bonneville
- Parent range: Caribou Range; Rocky Mountains
- Topo map: USGS Caribou Mountain

Climbing
- Easiest route: class 2 hiking

Caribou Mountain is a 9,803-foot elevation (2,988 m) mountain summit in Bonneville County, Idaho, United States.

== Description ==
Caribou Mountain is the highest peak in the Caribou Range which is a subset of the Rocky Mountains. The remote mountain is set 40 miles southeast of Idaho Falls, Idaho, in the Caribou–Targhee National Forest, and can be seen to the east of Grays Lake National Wildlife Refuge. Topographic relief is modest as the summit rises 3,400 feet (1,000 meters) above Grays Lake in four miles. Precipitation runoff from the mountain's slopes drains into tributaries of the Snake River watershed. This landform's toponym has been officially adopted by the United States Board on Geographic Names.

== Climate ==
Based on the Köppen climate classification, Caribou Mountain has an alpine subarctic climate with long, cold, snowy winters, and mild to warm summers. Winter temperatures can drop below 0 °F with wind chill factors below −20 °F.

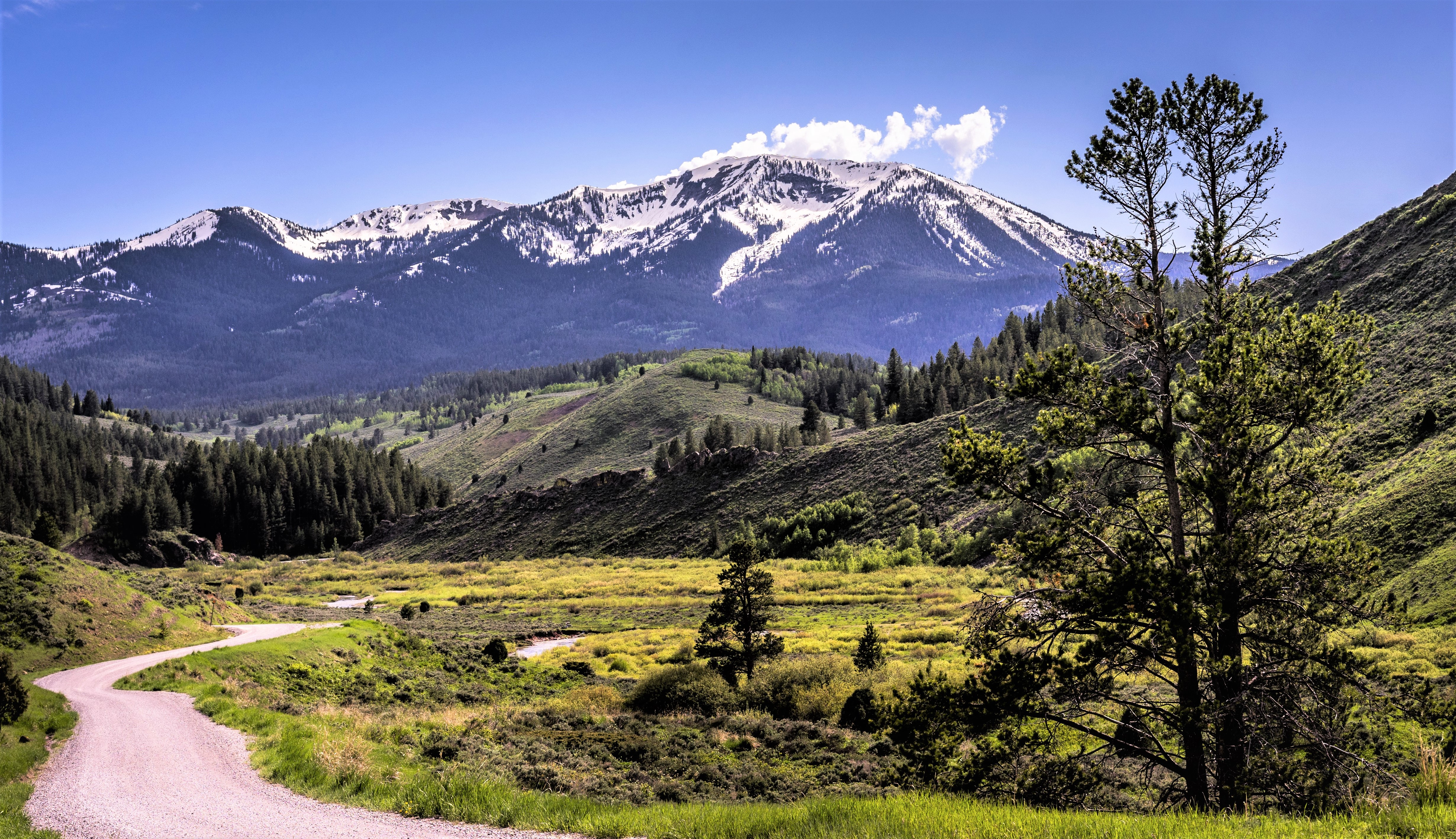
Caribou Mountain, May 2018

== See also ==
- List of mountain peaks of Idaho
