= Grays Lake (Idaho) =

Wetland in Idaho, United States

Coordinates: 43°03′N 111°27′W

Grays Lake is a wetland in Idaho, United States. It lies in Bonneville County and Caribou County. Grays Lake National Wildlife Refuge was established in the area in 1965. Ranching (cattle, sheep, hay production) is the predominant use of surrounding lands.

A variant name was "John Grays Lake". The lake was named after John Gray, a Canadian trapper.

== General ==
Grays Lake lies within the Caribou Range of the Rocky Mountains in southeast Idaho, and is at the western edge of the Greater Yellowstone Ecosystem. The valley lies about 30 miles north of Soda Springs, Idaho and about 70 miles southwest of Jackson Hole, Wyoming. At the heart of the valley is a large, 22,000-acre (89 km^{2}) shallow montane marsh, composed primarily of hardstem bulrush and cattail with scattered small ponds. This wetland system provides important habitat for breeding sandhill cranes, trumpeter swans, Franklin's gulls, white-faced ibis, dabbling and diving ducks, a variety of shore- and grassland birds, as well as habitat for molting and fall-staging waterfowl and cranes. The area is significant for its high density of breeding sandhill cranes and as a reintroduction site for trumpeter swans. The rich wet meadow edges of the marsh provide foraging and nesting habitat for a diversity of water birds each year.

Grays Lake National Wildlife Refuge encompasses much of the richest wetland habitat within the valley. It was established in 1965 to protect and restore habitat for waterfowl production, sandhill cranes, and other wildlife. In the 1970s and 1980s the refuge served as the focus of an effort to establish a second wild population of endangered whooping cranes. Currently, the refuge's goals are to enhance natural ecosystem functions to support a diversity of water birds and other wildlife.

=== Data ===
- Marsh elevation 6,386 ft (1,946 m).
- Caribou Mountain to northeast highest point within watershed (9,803 ft (2,988 m)).

== Climate ==
- Average annual precipitation 17 inches (432 mm).
- Average annual snowfall 115 inches (2,921 mm); average accumulations of 40-50 inches (102 – 127 cm).
- Daytime high temperatures average 68-75 °F (20-24 °C) in June and July.
- Hard frosts (<30 °F (<-1 °C) may occur in any month.
- Record high of 103 °F (39 °C) recorded in 1919 and record low of –62 °F (-52 °C) on January 1, 1978.

Dale Bitner is a Remote Automated Weather Station located in Gray, Idaho, on the eastern edge of Grays Lake National Wildlife Refuge. Dale Bitner has a humid continental climate (Köppen Dfb), bordering on a subarctic climate (Köppen Dfc).

Climate data for Dale Bitner (RAWS), Idaho, 2003–2020 normals, 1925-1954 precip/snowfall: 6391ft (1948m)
Month	Jan	Feb	Mar	Apr	May	Jun	Jul	Aug	Sep	Oct	Nov	Dec	Year
Record high °F (°C)	50 (10)	58 (14)	64 (18)	78 (26)	84 (29)	90 (32)	96 (36)	95 (35)	92 (33)	83 (28)	68 (20)	50 (10)	96 (36)
Mean maximum °F (°C)	43.1 (6.2)	47.8 (8.8)	55.4 (13.0)	68.3 (20.2)	76.5 (24.7)	83.7 (28.7)	90.0 (32.2)	90.1 (32.3)	84.9 (29.4)	73.4 (23.0)	60.4 (15.8)	45.8 (7.7)	91.2 (32.9)
Mean daily maximum °F (°C)	29.2 (−1.6)	33.2 (0.7)	43.1 (6.2)	49.8 (9.9)	59.7 (15.4)	69.8 (21.0)	81.3 (27.4)	80.0 (26.7)	70.6 (21.4)	55.0 (12.8)	41.2 (5.1)	29.6 (−1.3)	53.5 (12.0)
Daily mean °F (°C)	17.1 (−8.3)	19.8 (−6.8)	29.8 (−1.2)	37.9 (3.3)	47.1 (8.4)	54.7 (12.6)	63.2 (17.3)	60.8 (16.0)	52.2 (11.2)	40.5 (4.7)	29.3 (−1.5)	18.8 (−7.3)	39.3 (4.0)
Mean daily minimum °F (°C)	4.9 (−15.1)	6.4 (−14.2)	16.4 (−8.7)	26.1 (−3.3)	34.5 (1.4)	39.7 (4.3)	45.2 (7.3)	41.6 (5.3)	33.9 (1.1)	25.9 (−3.4)	17.3 (−8.2)	8.0 (−13.3)	25.0 (−3.9)
Mean minimum °F (°C)	−22.7 (−30.4)	−23.0 (−30.6)	−10.8 (−23.8)	10.1 (−12.2)	21.9 (−5.6)	29.4 (−1.4)	35.5 (1.9)	29.8 (−1.2)	20.6 (−6.3)	8.7 (−12.9)	−7.1 (−21.7)	−21.7 (−29.8)	−31.2 (−35.1)
Record low °F (°C)	−38 (−39)	−39 (−39)	−27 (−33)	−4 (−20)	16 (−9)	26 (−3)	29 (−2)	23 (−5)	14 (−10)	−13 (−25)	−22 (−30)	−36 (−38)	−39 (−39)
Average precipitation inches (mm)	1.55 (39)	1.44 (37)	1.43 (36)	1.44 (37)	1.80 (46)	1.93 (49)	0.83 (21)	1.03 (26)	1.08 (27)	1.39 (35)	1.47 (37)	1.40 (36)	16.79 (426)
Average snowfall inches (cm)	22.3 (57)	16.6 (42)	15.1 (38)	7.6 (19)	2.1 (5.3)	0.5 (1.3)	0.0 (0.0)	0.0 (0.0)	0.6 (1.5)	4.8 (12)	12.8 (33)	18.3 (46)	100.7 (255.1)
Source: XMACIS2 (Gray 1925-1954 precip/snow)

== Habitat and plant communities ==
- Transitional zone between Great Basin vegetation (south) and Rocky Mountain vegetation (north).
- Within approved refuge boundary, 60% palustrine emergent wetland, 20% wetland semi-wet meadow, 12% brush, grasslands, and grain fields, 5% shallow open water with submergents, and 3% aspen forest and willow thicket.
- Over 170 species of grasses, sedges and forbs in wet meadows and marsh habitat, including 15 species of sedges.
- 3 species of exotic, invasive plants.
- 7 species of trees and 17 species of shrubs
- No known threatened or endangered plant species.

== Wildlife ==
- 128 recorded species of breeding birds present.
- Over 40 bird species nesting in the wet meadow and wetland habitats of the basin.
- 20 species of mammals.
- 4 species of amphibians.
- 6 species of reptiles.
- 1 species protected as "threatened or endangered" (trumpeter swan).
- Highest breeding density of sandhill cranes in North America - an important breeding area for Rocky Mountain Population of sandhill cranes.
- 700-800 cranes present in May; 1,000 or more cranes stage in the basin in September.
- Nesting colonies of Franklin's gulls and white-faced ibis.

== Water ==
- Located within Willow Watershed, 651.45 mi^{2} (1,686.5 km^{2}) in size.
- Average water depth 11.5 feet (3.5 m) in spring; <0.5 ft (15 cm) in late July through September.
- Water sources from snowmelt and numerous springs; main inflow via Willow, Eagle, and Gravel Creeks on the east and south, and Crane Creek on the west.
- Original water outlet, Grays Lake Outlet, drains to the north into Snake River via Willow Creek.
- Clark's Cut, a man-made channel completed in 1924, drains into the Blackfoot Reservoir via Meadow creek.
- Water discharge controlled by the Bureau of Indian Affairs for use in Fort Hall Irrigation Project since the early 1920s.
- Drainage canals and drainage ditches were established during various periods (1920s, 1950s, 1960s).

== Geology ==
- Meade Thrust Fault principle structure underlying basin.
- Cretaceous rocks underlie Willow, Eagle, and Bridge Creeks, predominantly sandstones and shales.
- Paleozoic and Triassic rocks underlie Gravel Creek basin, predominantly carbonates with Quaternary alluvium covering lowlands.
- Tertiary volcanics (mainly olivine basalts) underlie most western drainage.
- Bear Island olivine basalt.

== Access and wildlife viewing ==
- Public road perimeter allows excellent bird viewing, particularly in May and early June when water levels are high.
- Viewing opportunities from Beavertail Point (south), refuge observation area (east), and north perimeter road.
- Access into marsh largely closed to the public to minimize disturbance of breeding sandhill cranes, trumpeter swans, and other waterbirds.
- Small Visitors Center at refuge headquarters; no other public facilities available.
- Access during fall waterfowl hunting on north half of basin.

== Grays Lake National Wildlife Refuge ==
- Established 1965 for production of migratory waterfowl and other waterbirds
- Total area within proposed refuge boundary 32,825 acres (133 km^{2})
- Active research program for adaptive management of habitat and wildlife populations.
- Management of grasslands and wet meadow using prescribed fire, grazing, idling, haying, and rotation systems.
