= Caribou Range =

Mountain range in Idaho and Wyoming in the United States

Coordinates: 43°20′N 111°30′W

The Caribou Range (also known as the Caribou Mountains) is a mountain range in the Rocky Mountains in Bonneville, Bingham, and Caribou counties in Idaho, United States, that extends into Lincoln County, Wyoming.

The mountains are in the Caribou National Forest in Bonneville and Caribou counties, near the Wyoming border.

Named for Cariboo Fairchild, a prospector who had taken part in the gold rush in the Cariboo region of British Columbia in 1860. Fairchild discovered gold in this area of present-day eastern Idaho two years later.

The highest point of the range is 9,803-foot Caribou Mountain.

== See also ==
- List of mountain ranges in Idaho
- List of mountain ranges in Wyoming
