= Grays Lake National Wildlife Refuge =

Wildlife refuge in Bonneville and Caribou counties in Idaho, United States

- IUCN category IV (habitat/species management area)
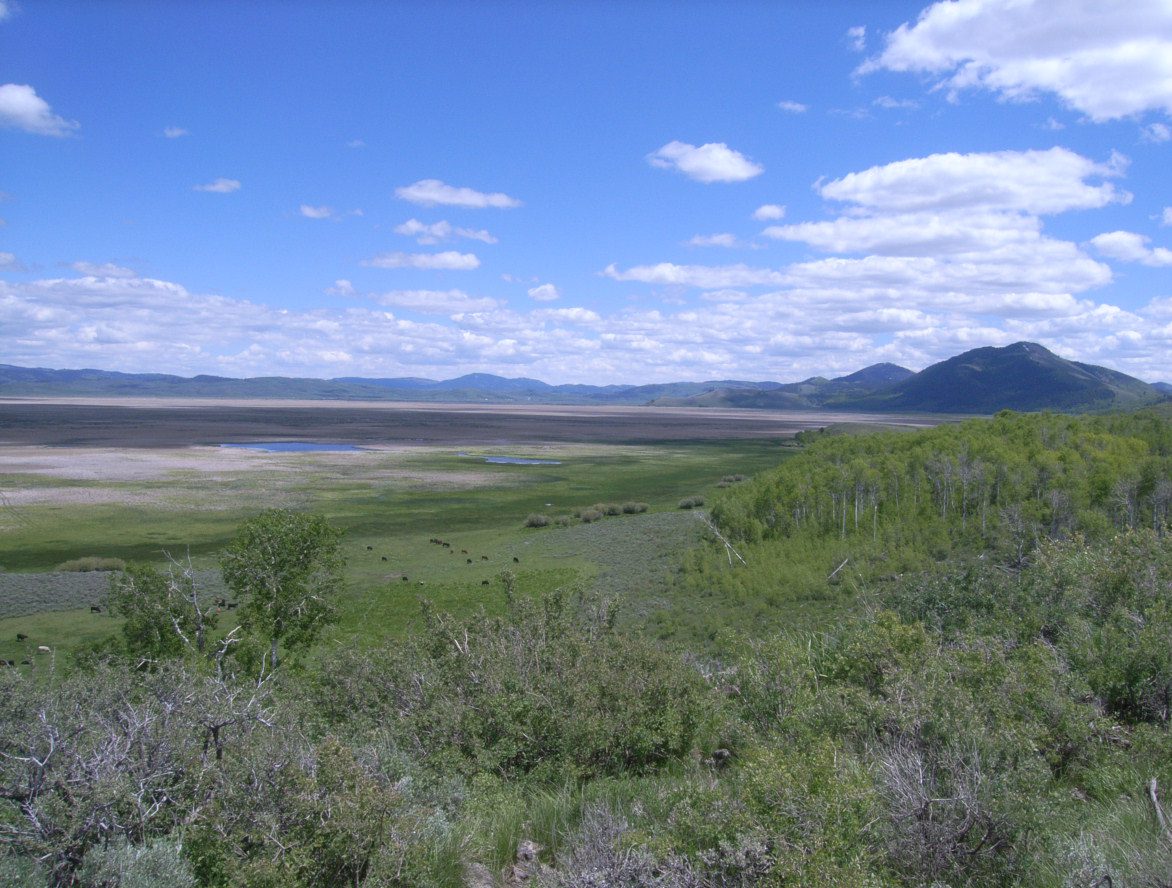

- Location within the United States
- Location: Bonneville County, Caribou County, Idaho, United States
- Nearest city: Soda Springs, Idaho
- Coordinates: 43.06297°N 111.42689°W
- Area: 19,400 acres (79 km^{2})
- Established: 1965
- Governing body: U.S. Fish and Wildlife Service
- Website: Grays Lake National Wildlife Refuge

Grays Lake National Wildlife Refuge is a National Wildlife Refuge of the United States located in Bonneville and Caribou counties in southeastern Idaho. It has the largest hardstem bulrush marsh in North America. Located in a high mountain valley near Soda Springs, the refuge and surrounding mountains offer scenic vistas, wildflowers, and fall foliage displays. Lands adjacent to the 19,400-acre (79 km^{2}) refuge are primarily wet meadows and grasslands. The refuge provides breeding habitat for species of mammals including moose, elk, mule deer, muskrat, badger, and weasel.

== Geography ==
The refuge has a surface area of 20,125.08 acres (81.4433 km^{2}; 8,144.33 ha).

== Bird habitat ==
The refuge hosts a large nesting population of greater sandhill cranes; as many as 1200 individuals are counted in the valley during migration and staging times. The refuge is a birding destination, and a good area to view the rare trumpeter swans. This near-pristine montane wetland is being threatened by the same type of suburban/rural development that has so heavily impacted nearby Jackson Hole.
