= Deadwood Peak (California) =

Mountain in Alpine County, California, United States

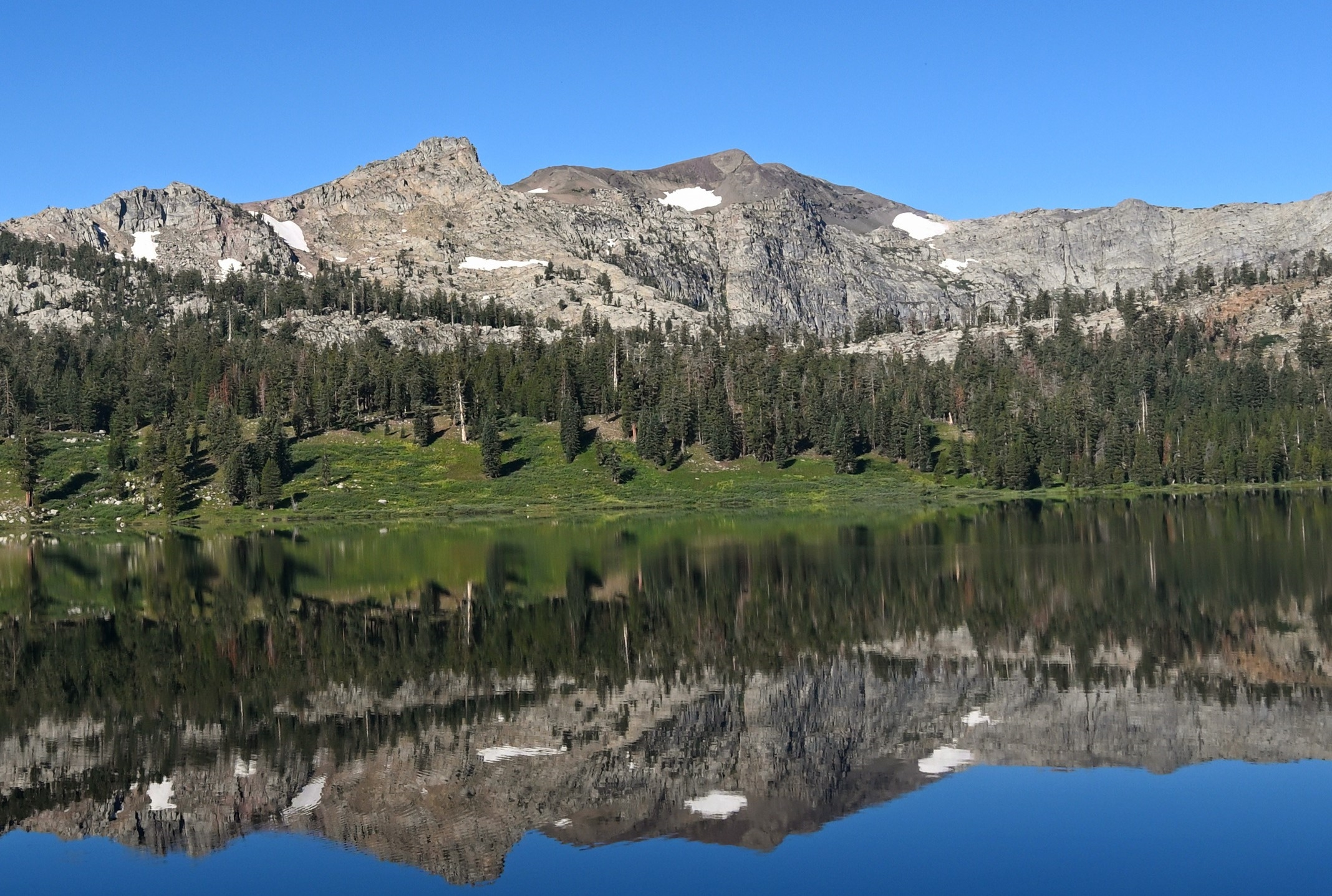
- East aspect

Highest point
- Elevation: 9,846 ft (3,001 m)
- Prominence: 1,366 ft (416 m)
- Parent peak: Round Top (10,381ft)
- Isolation: 2.48 mi (3.99 km)
- Coordinates: 38°37′43″N 119°59′33″W

Geography
- Location within California Location within the United States
- Country: United States
- State: California
- County: Alpine
- Protected area: Mokelumne Wilderness
- Parent range: Sierra Nevada
- Topo map: USGS Carson Pass

Deadwood Peak is a 9,846-foot-elevation (3,001-meter) mountain summit in Alpine County, California, United States.

== Description ==
Deadwood Peak is part of the Sierra Nevada mountain range and is located in the Mokelumne Wilderness on land managed by the Eldorado National Forest. The peak ranks as the fourth-highest in the wilderness and the forest. The summit is situated 4.5 miles (7.2 km) south of Carson Pass and 2.45 miles (3.94 km) south of Round Top. Precipitation runoff from the peak's slopes drains into tributaries of the Mokelumne River. Topographic relief is significant as the summit rises 2,000 feet (610 meters) above Devils Corral in 0.6 miles (0.97 km) and 3,100 feet (940 meters) above Summit City Creek in 2.25 miles (3.62 km). This landform's toponym was officially adopted in 1980 by the U.S. Board on Geographic Names, although it had been in use for 30 years prior.

== Climate ==
According to the Köppen climate classification system, Deadwood Peak is located in an alpine climate zone. Most weather fronts originate in the Pacific Ocean and travel east toward the Sierra Nevada mountains. As fronts approach, they are forced upward by the peaks (orographic lift), causing them to drop their moisture in the form of rain or snowfall onto the range.

== See also ==
- Mountains of Alpine County, California

== Gallery ==
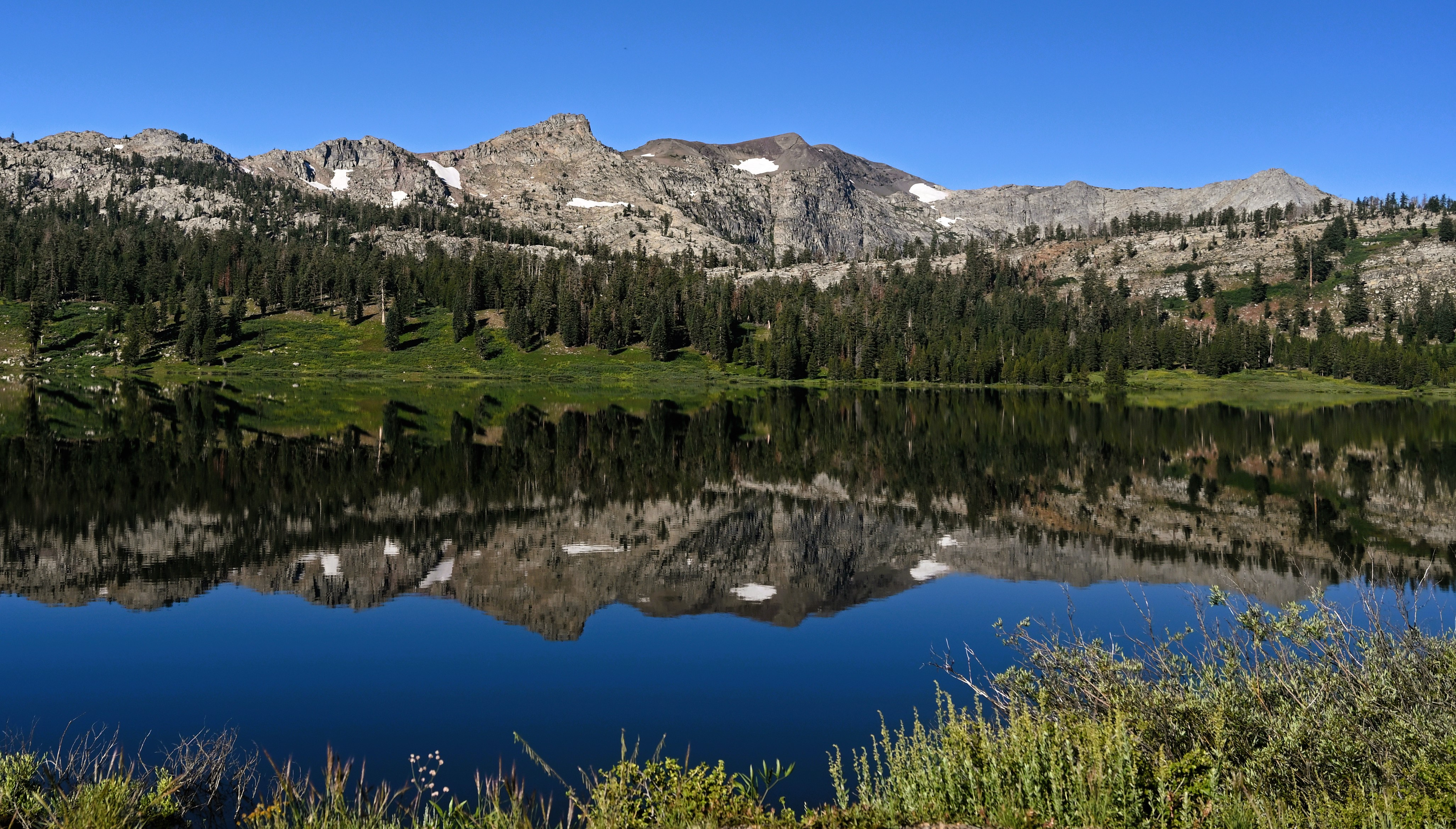
Deadwood Peak reflected in Upper Blue Lake

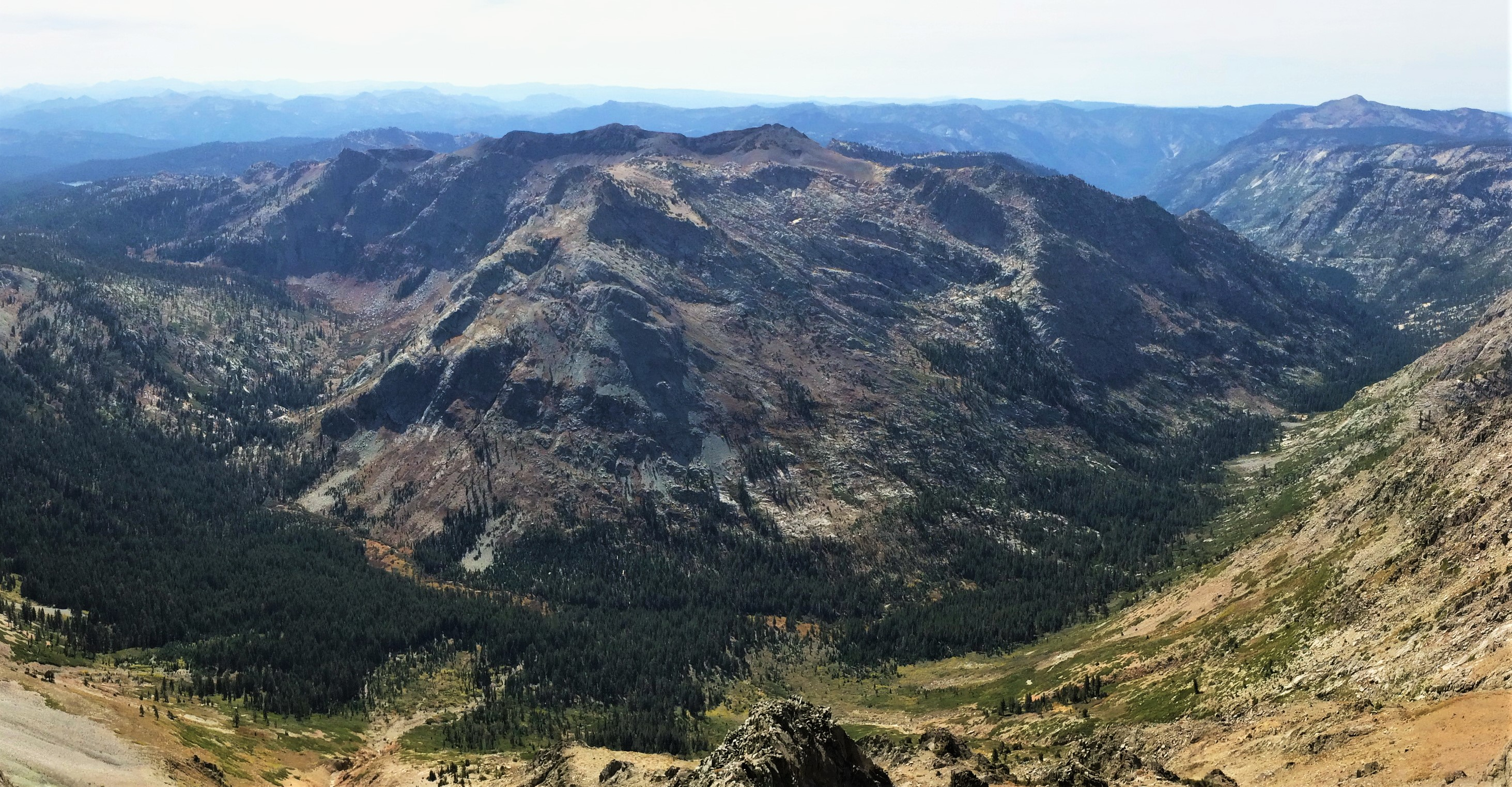
North aspect of Deadwood Peak viewed from Round Top

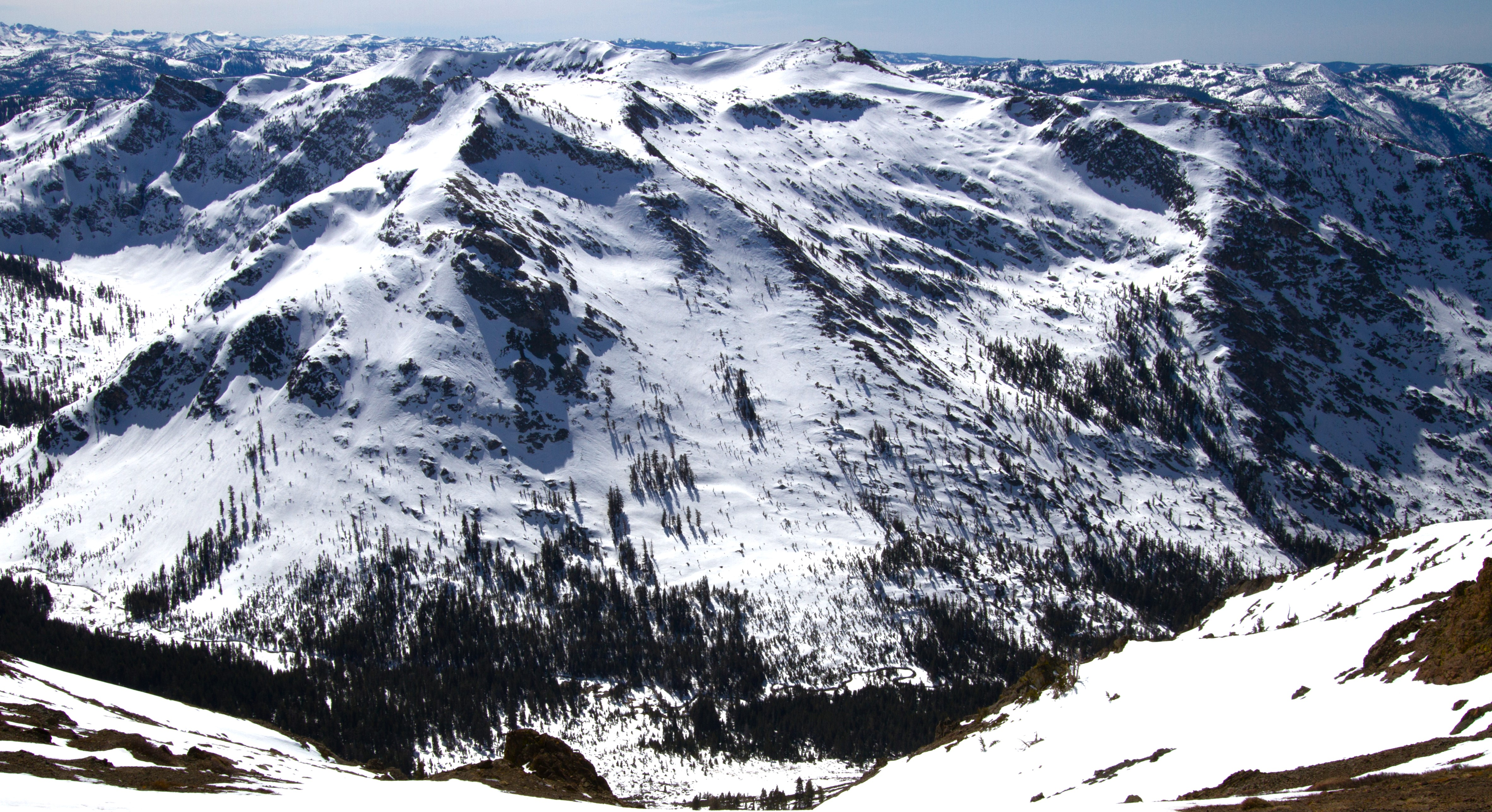
North aspect of Deadwood Peak viewed from Round Top in late winter

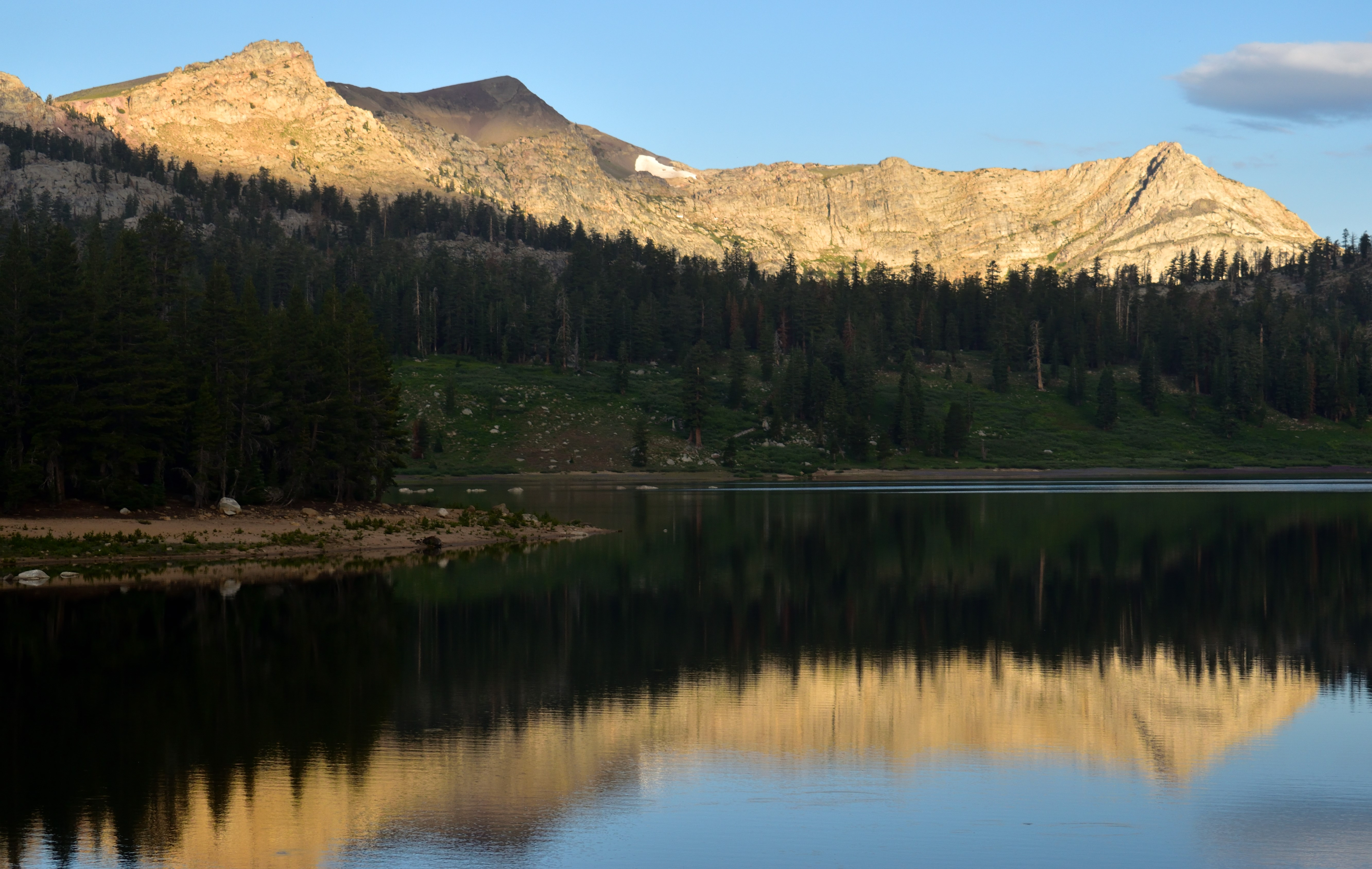
Deadwood Peak from Upper Blue Lake

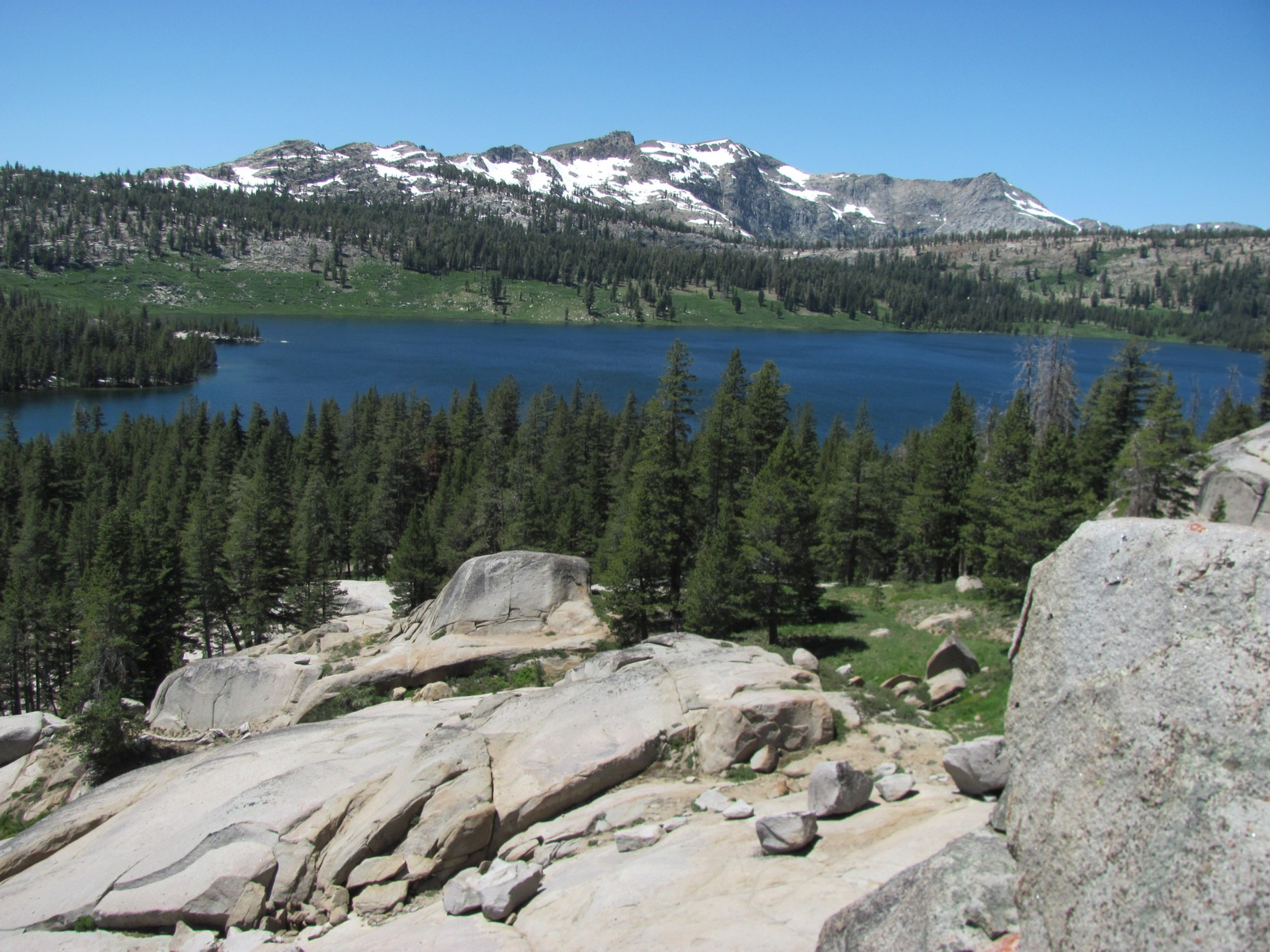
Deadwood Peak with Upper Blue Lake
