= The Nipple =

Mountain summit in Alpine County, California, United States

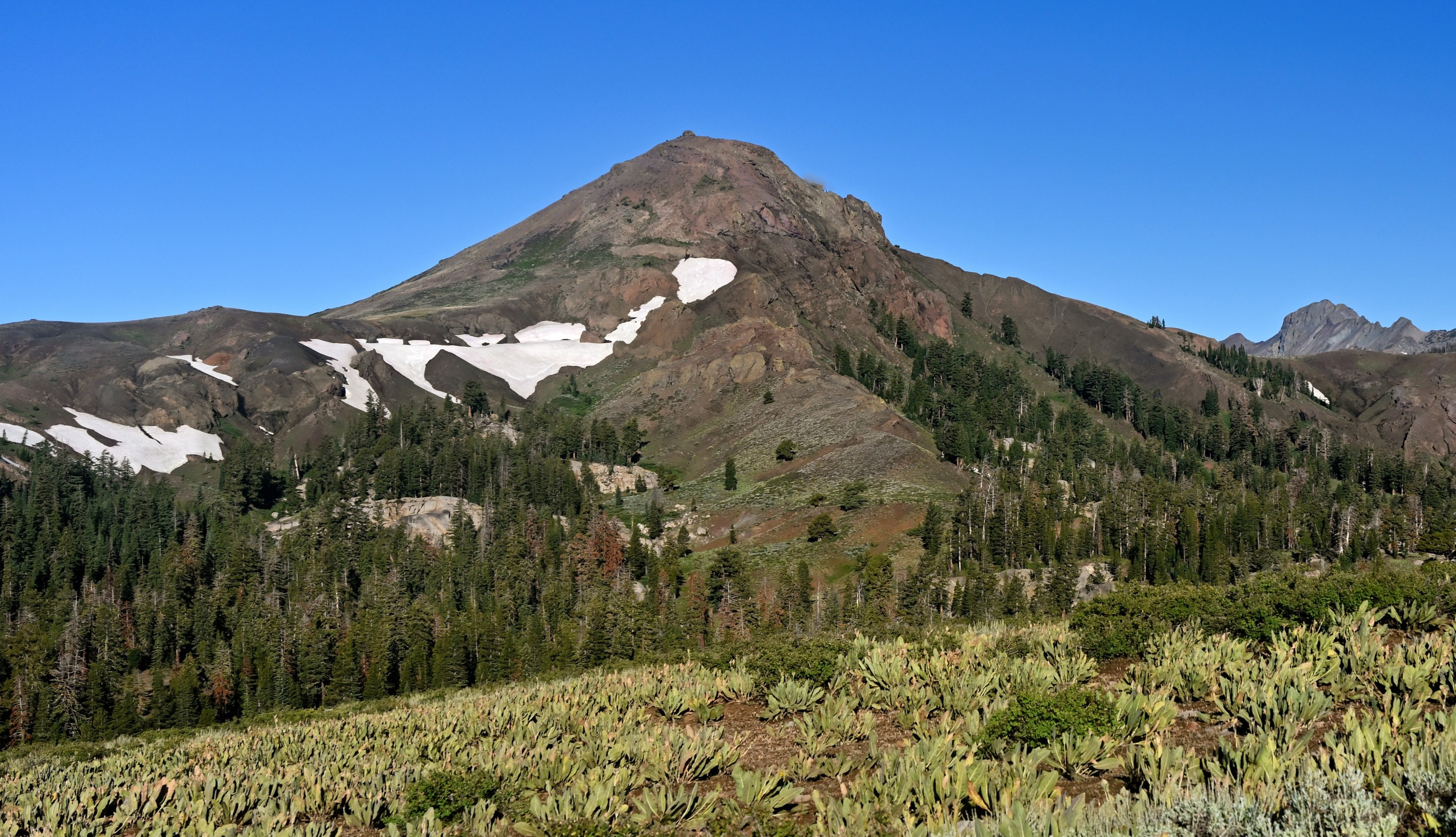
- East aspect

Highest point
- Elevation: 9,342 ft (2,847 m)
- Prominence: 702 ft (214 m)
- Parent peak: Round Top (10,381ft)
- Isolation: 1.57 mi (2.53 km)
- Coordinates: 38°38′24″N 119°55′59″W

Geography
- Location within California Location within the United States
- Country: United States
- State: California
- County: Alpine
- Protected area: Mokelumne Wilderness
- Parent range: Sierra Nevada
- Topo map: USGS Carson Pass

Climbing
- Easiest route: class 2+ scrambling

The Nipple is a 9,342-foot-elevation (2,847-meter) mountain summit in Alpine County, California, United States.

== Description ==
The Nipple is located in the Mokelumne Wilderness of the Sierra Nevada mountain range. The summit is situated 4.5 miles (7.2 km) southeast of Carson Pass and 3.73 miles (6.00 km) east-southeast of Round Top. It is set on the boundary shared by Humboldt–Toiyabe National Forest and Eldorado National Forest. Precipitation runoff from the peak's north and east slopes drains into tributaries of the Carson River, whereas the south slope drains to Mokelumne River via Middle, Blue, and Deer creeks. Topographic relief is modest as the summit rises 1,200 feet (370 meters) above Upper Blue Lake in 0.7 miles (1.1 km). The Pacific Crest Trail traverses the southern slope of this peak, providing an approach from California State Route 88. This landform's descriptive toponym has been officially adopted by the U.S. Board on Geographic Names, and has been recorded in publications since at least 1899.

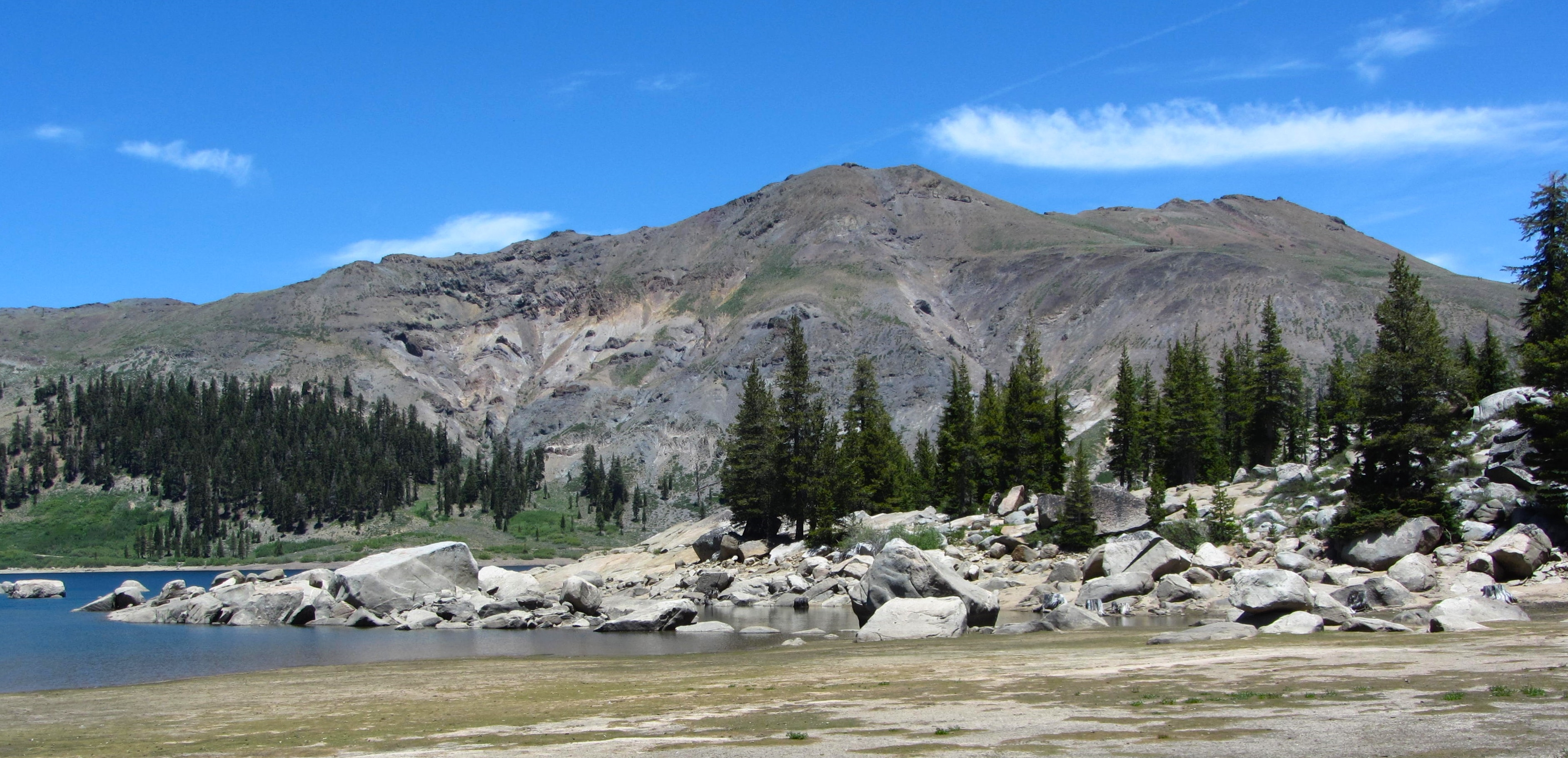
Southwest aspect of The Nipple viewed from Upper Blue Lake. Summit in upper right.

== Climate ==
According to the Köppen climate classification system, The Nipple is located in an alpine climate zone. Most weather fronts originate in the Pacific Ocean and travel east toward the Sierra Nevada mountains. As fronts approach, they are forced upward by the peaks (orographic lift), causing them to drop their moisture in the form of rain or snowfall onto the range.

== See also ==
- Mountains of Alpine County, California
