= Mokelumne Peak =

Mountain in California, United States

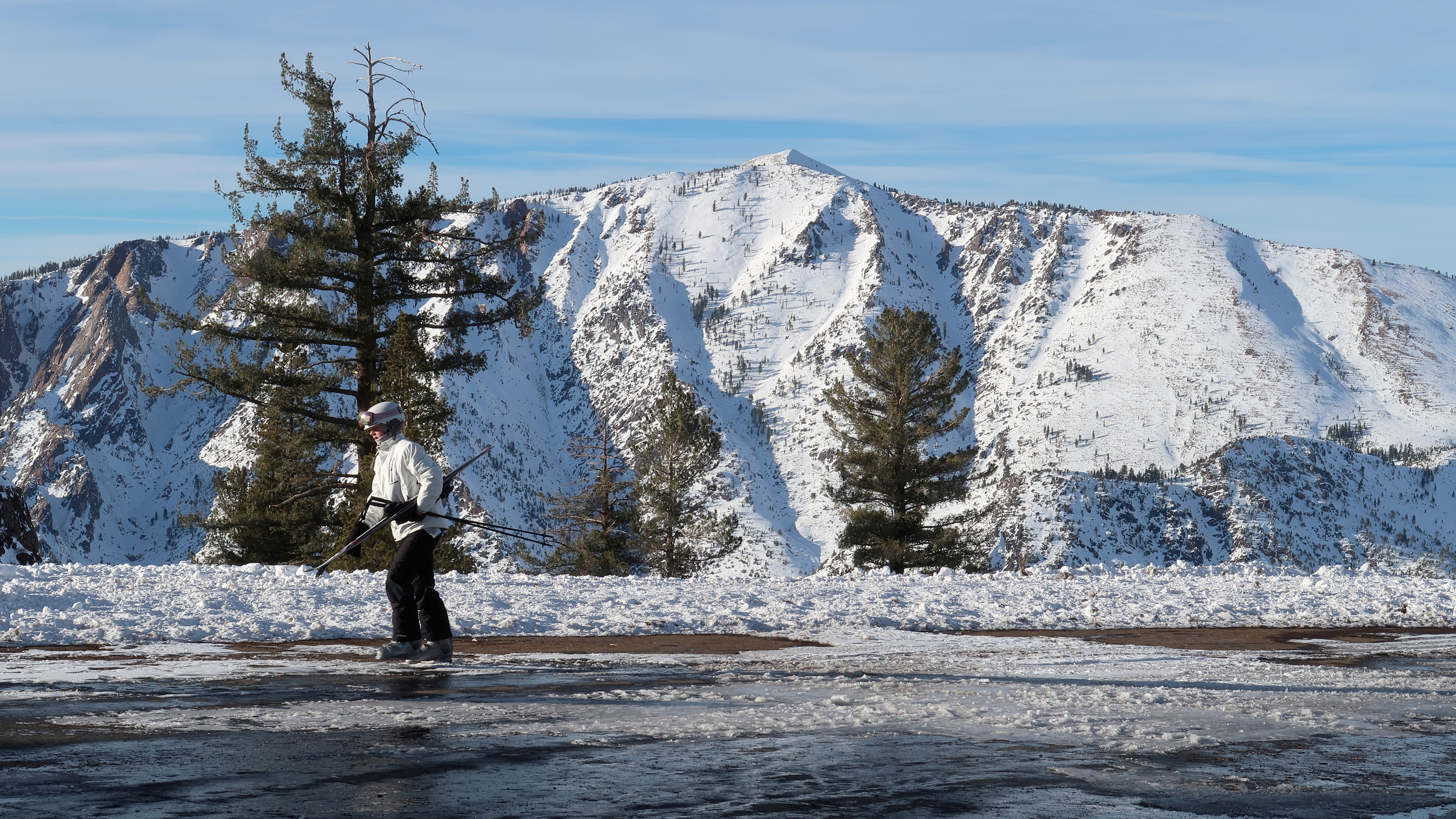

Highest point
- Elevation: 9,337 ft (2,846 m)
- Prominence: 1,494 ft (455 m)
- Isolation: 7.31 mi (11.76 km)
- Listing: Western States Climbers Star peak; Sierra Club Sierra Peaks Section; Tahoe-OGUL Star Peak
- Coordinates: 38°32′17″N 120°05′40″W

Geography
- Location within California
- Location: Mokelumne Wilderness; Amador County, California, U.S.
- Parent range: Sierra Nevada

Climbing
- Easiest route: Simple Scramble, class 2

Mokelumne Peak is a peak in the Mokelumne Wilderness, Sierra Nevada, Amador County, California, consisting of metamorphic and granitic rock.

== Geology ==
Mokelumne Peak has the largest body of metamorphic rock in the region, called the Mokelumne Peak roof pendant, extending over an area of 15 square miles (39 km^{2}). These rocks were originally Jurassic or Cretaceous age, but were metamorphosed when plutons of the Sierra Nevada batholith intruded in the Cretaceous. The pendant may be several thousand feet thick. Rocks of the pendant include quartz-feldspar-biotite schist and gneiss. The pendant has concentric zones of different metamorphic rock types around a central core of highly folded and contorted gneiss.

The granite of the batholith surrounding the roof pendant is the granodiorite of Caples Lake. The granite is medium- to coarse-grained porphyritic hornblende-biotite granodiorite, determined by K-Ar dating to be between 91.7 and 99.6 million years old.

Thirty mining claims were staked on Mokelumne Peak between 1929 and 1934. Rocks on the east side of the peak contain arsenopyrite, chalcopyrite, and bornite. Samples contained 0.3 grams per ton of gold and 7 grams per ton of silver.
