= Elephants Back =

Mountain is Alpine County, California, USA

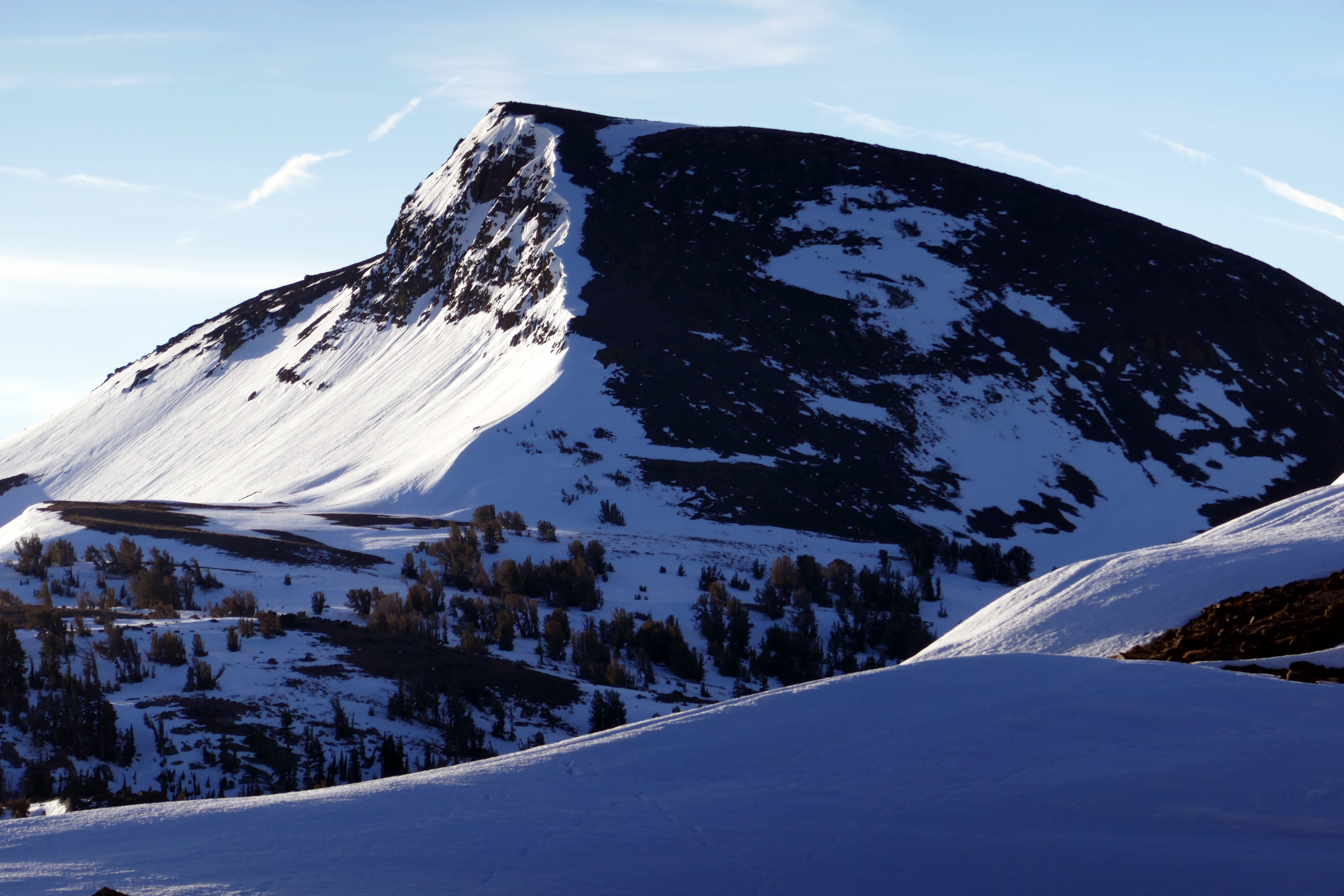
- North aspect

Highest point
- Elevation: 9,585 ft (2,922 m)
- Prominence: 465 ft (142 m)
- Parent peak: Round Top (10,381ft)
- Isolation: 1.43 mi (2.30 km)
- Coordinates: 38°40′42″N 119°58′59″W

Geography
- Location within California Location within the United States
- Location: Mokelumne Wilderness
- Country: United States of America
- State: California
- County: Alpine
- Parent range: Sierra Nevada
- Topo map: USGS Carson Pass

Geology
- Rock age: Miocene
- Mountain type: Lava dome
- Rock type: andesitic

Climbing
- First ascent: 1844
- Easiest route: class 1 hiking

Elephants Back is a 9,585-foot-elevation (2,922-meter) mountain summit located in Alpine County, California, United States.

== Description ==
This landmark of Hope Valley is set in the Mokelumne Wilderness of the Sierra Nevada mountain range. The summit is situated one mile south of Carson Pass and 1.4 miles (2.3 km) northeast of line parent Round Top. Elephants Back is a lava dome which was created in association with the now-inactive volcanic vent that is Round Top. Precipitation runoff from the peak's east slope drains to the West Fork Carson River via Red Lake Creek, whereas the west slope drains to Caples Lake via Woods Creek. Topographic relief is significant as the summit rises 1,600 feet (490 meters) above Forestdale Creek in less than one mile. The Pacific Crest Trail traverses the eastern and northern slopes of this peak, providing an approach from California State Route 88.

== History ==
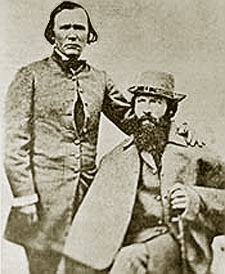
Kit Carson, John Frémont

During his second exploratory expedition, John C. Frémont camped at the base of Elephants Back's north ridge on February 9, 1844. At this spot, the party burned two trees to protect themselves from icy winds of a fierce winter storm. Frémont and Kit Carson made the first known ascent of Elephants Back three days earlier, on February 6, 1844, and were able to see the Sacramento Valley from the summit.

The United States Geological Survey surveyed this area in 1889 and labelled this geographic feature on their 1893 Markleeville quadrangle map. This landform is so named because of its resemblance to the animal. This landform's toponym has been officially adopted by the U.S. Board on Geographic Names. It has also been called "Elephant Mountain", "Elephant's Back", and "The Elephant."

== Climate ==
According to the Köppen climate classification system, Elephants Back is located in an alpine climate zone. Most weather fronts originate in the Pacific Ocean and travel east toward the Sierra Nevada mountains. As fronts approach, they are forced upward by the peaks (orographic lift), causing them to drop their moisture in the form of rain or snowfall onto the range.

== Geology ==
Elephants Back is an andesitic lava dome, a type of volcano. Due to its position, it could be a flank vent of Round Top (Alpine County, California).

== Gallery ==
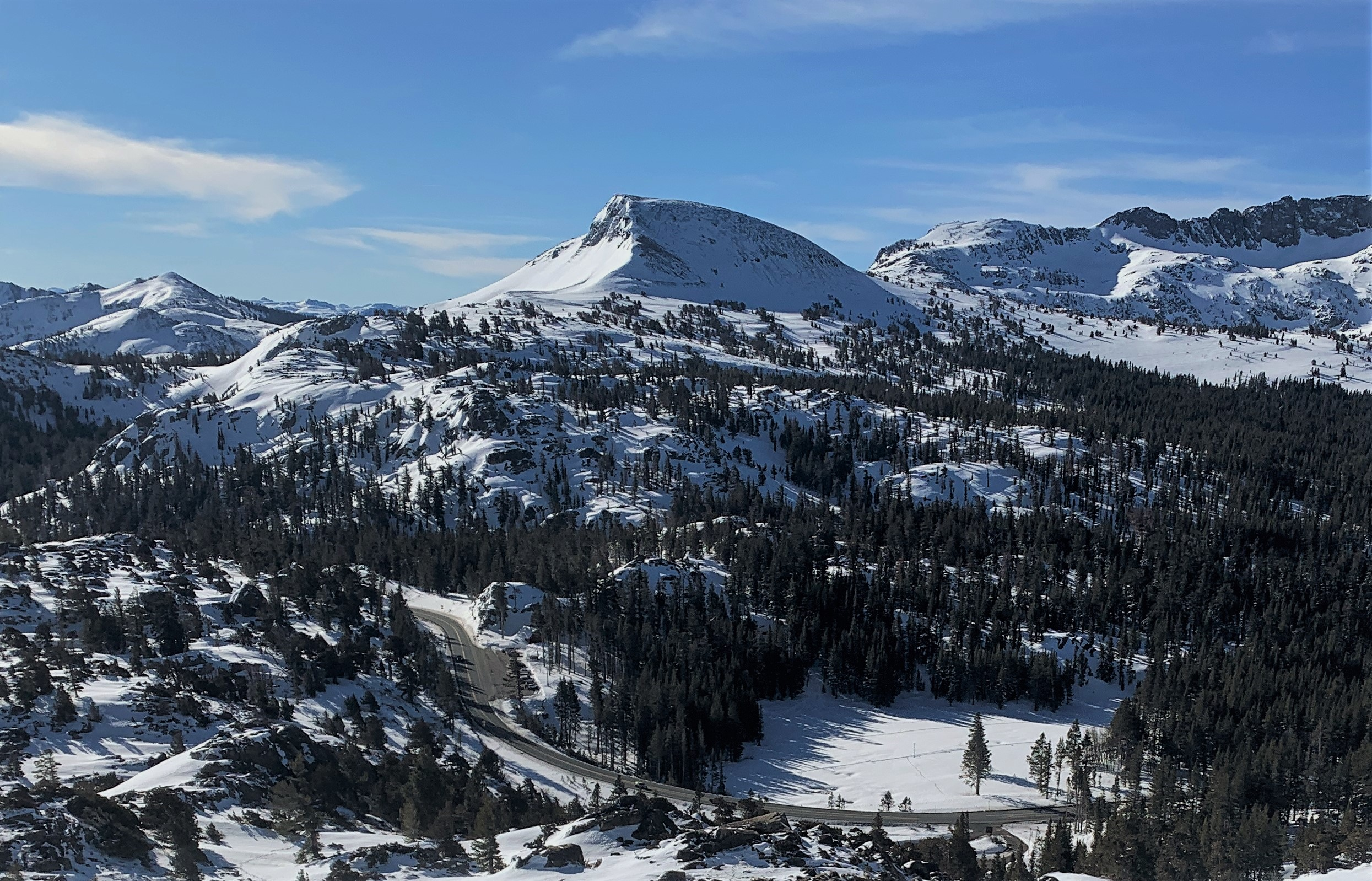
Winter scene from slopes of Red Lake Peak at Carson Pass with Elephants Back centered at top

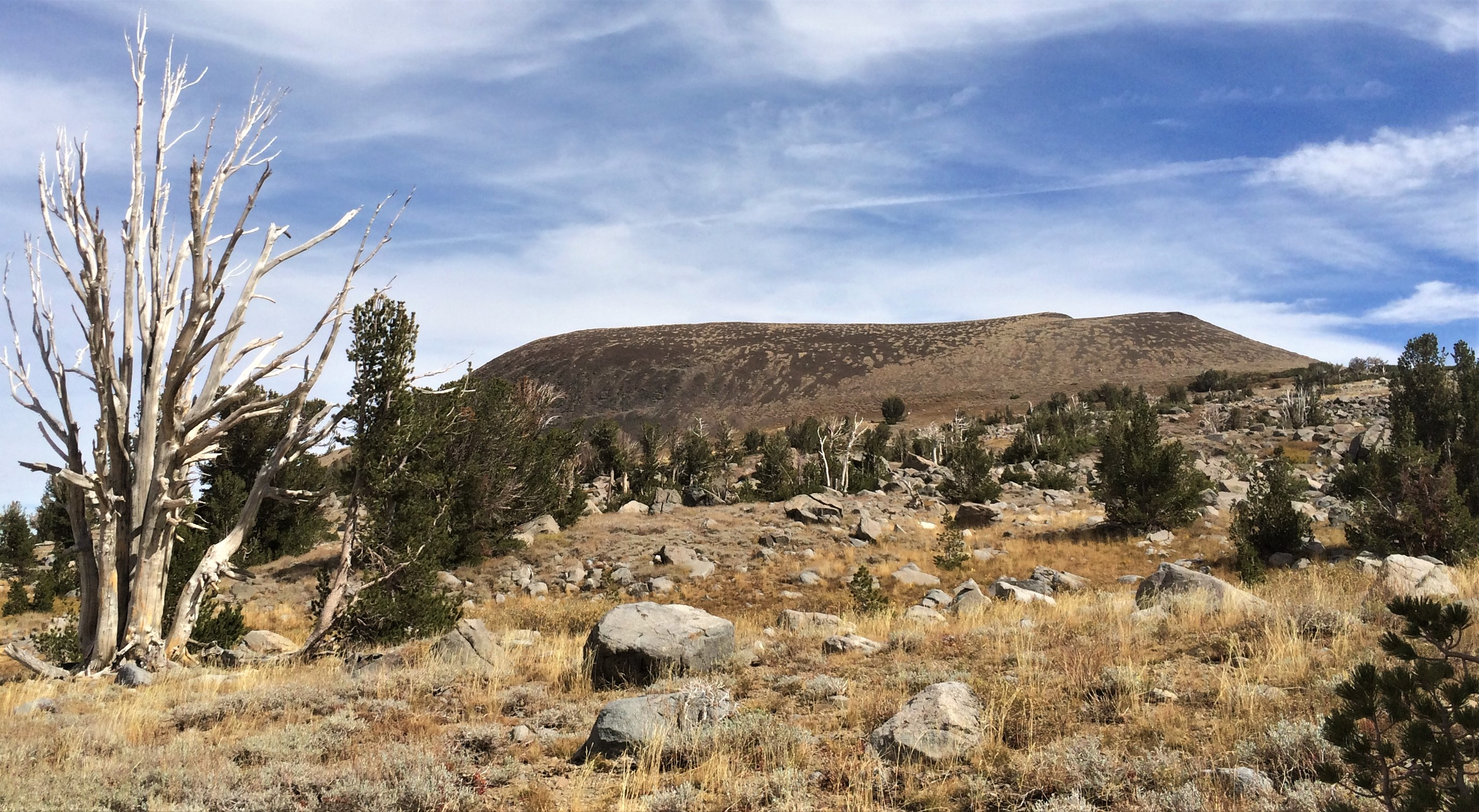
West aspect of Elephants Back from the trail to Winnemucca Lake.

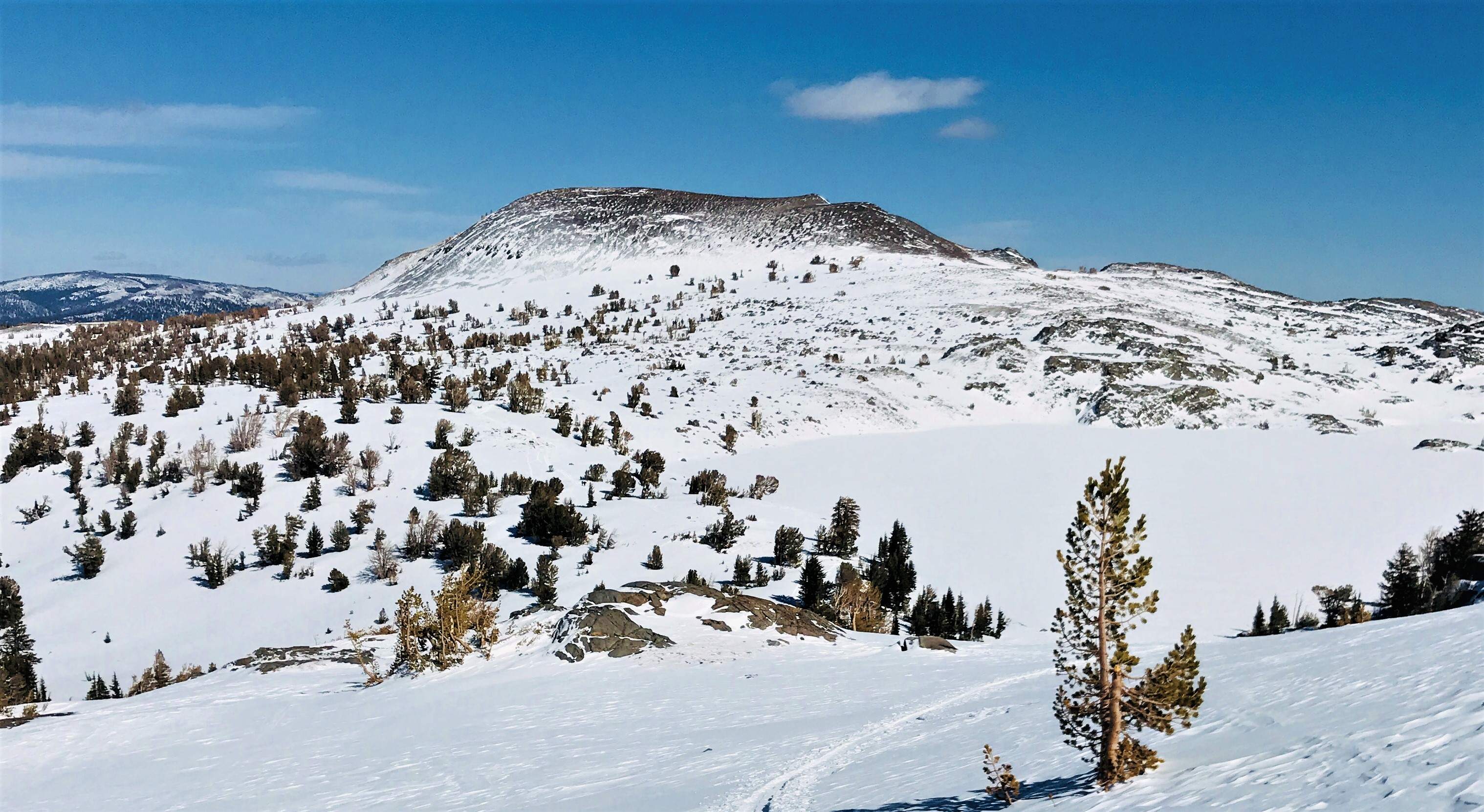
Southwest aspect of Elephants Back, with Winnemucca Lake

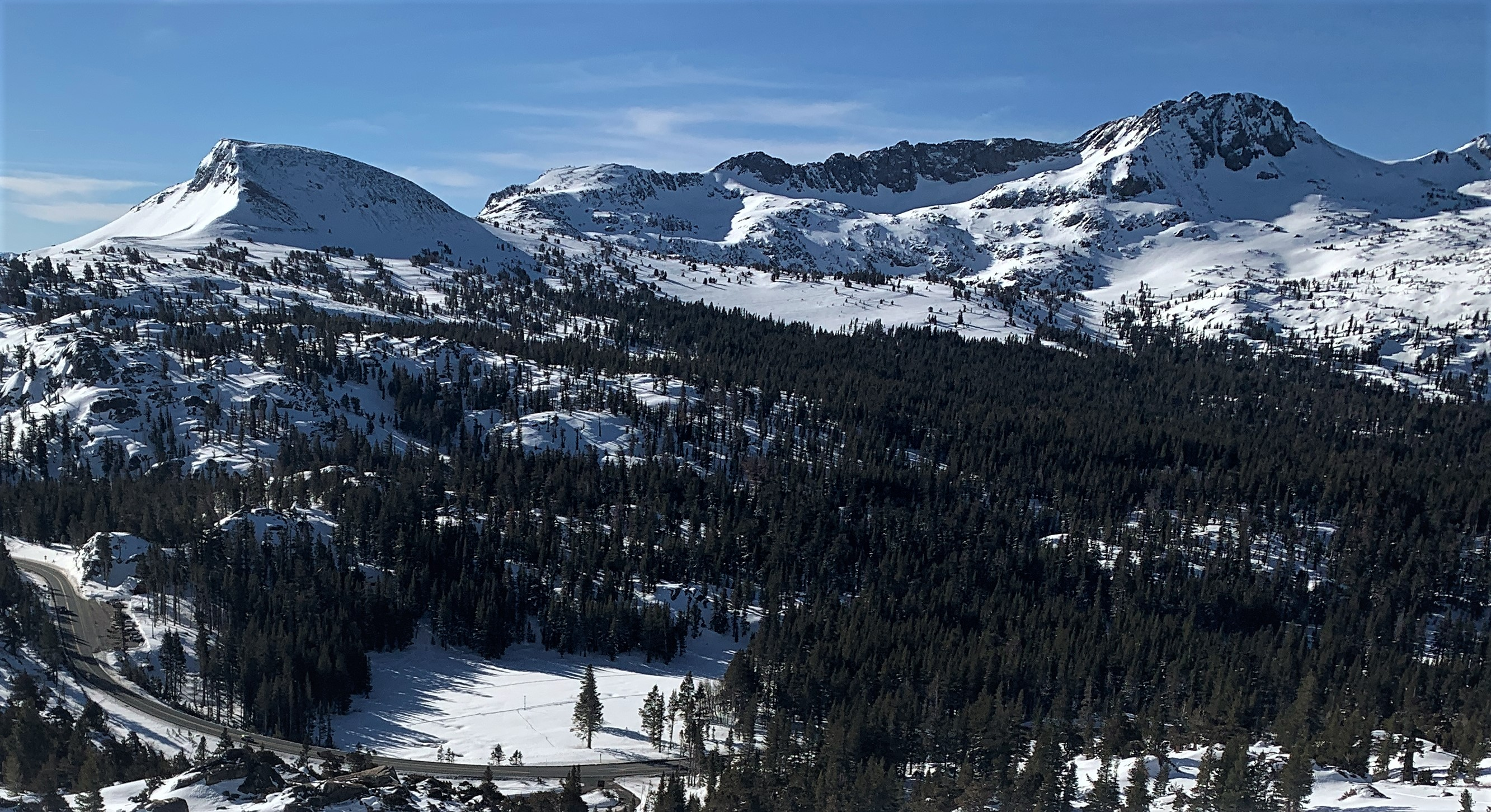
Elephants Back (left) and Round Top (right)

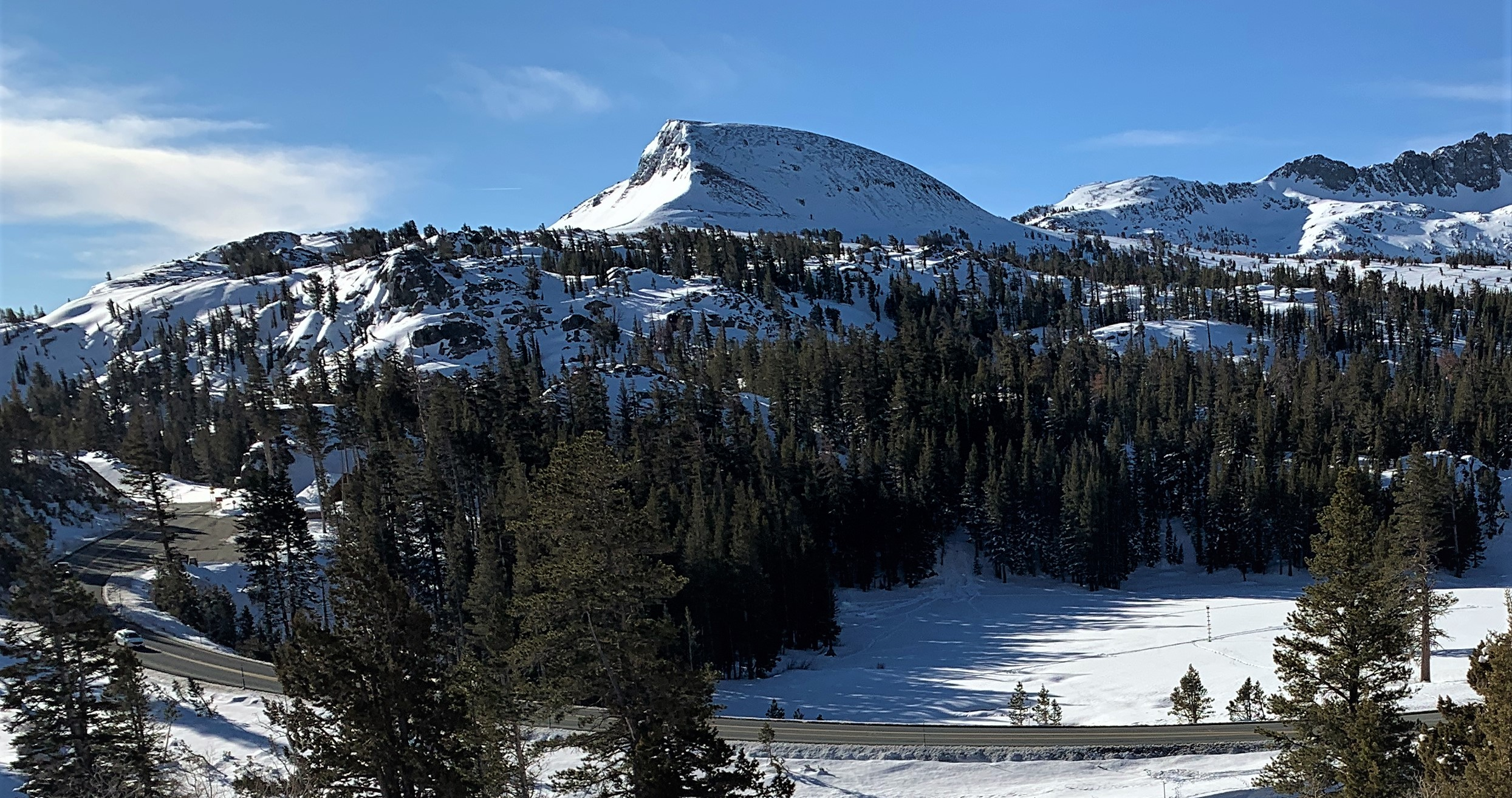
North aspect of Elephants Back rises above Carson Pass

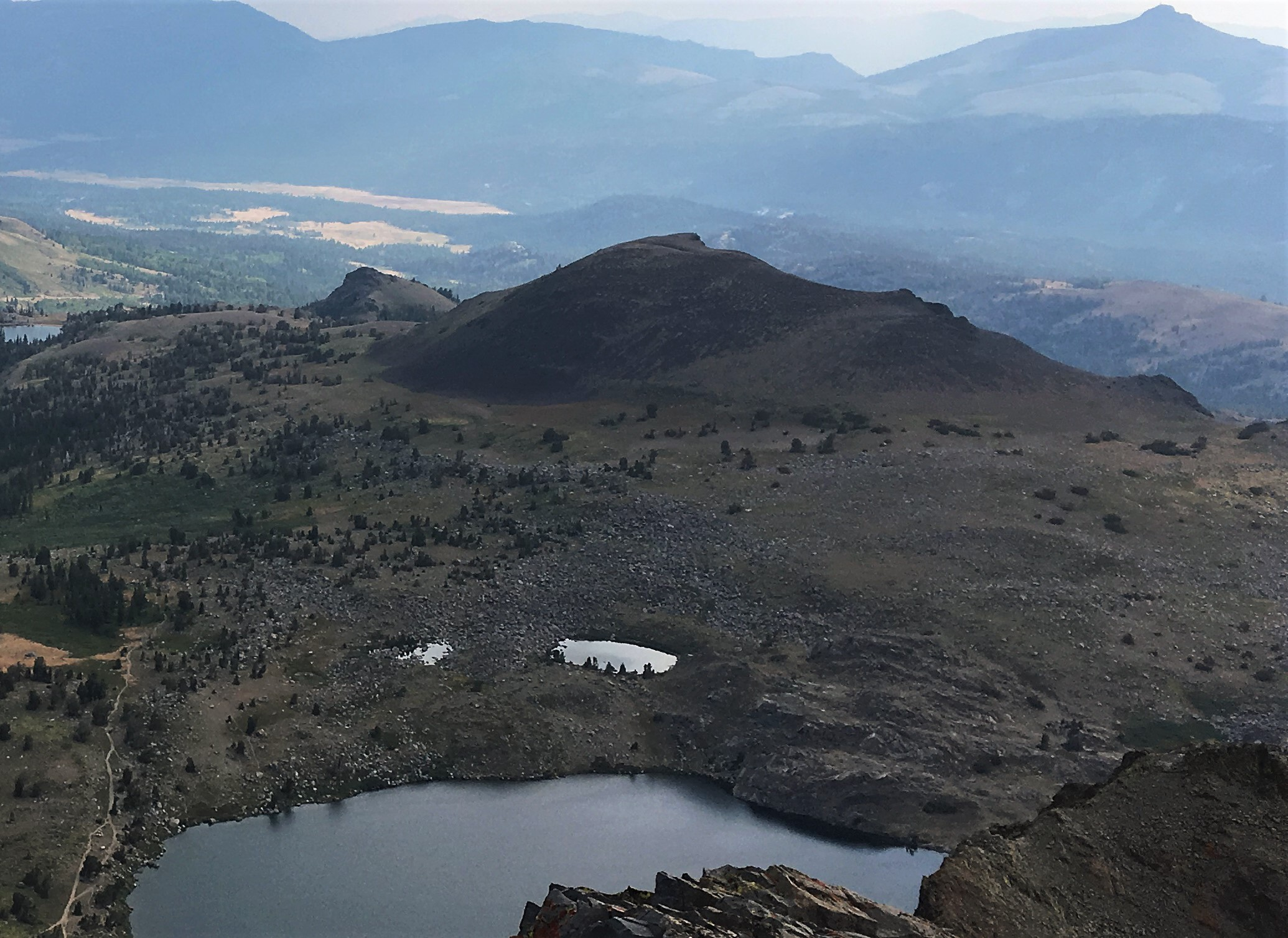
Winnemucca Lake, Elephants Back, and Hope Valley seen from Round Top

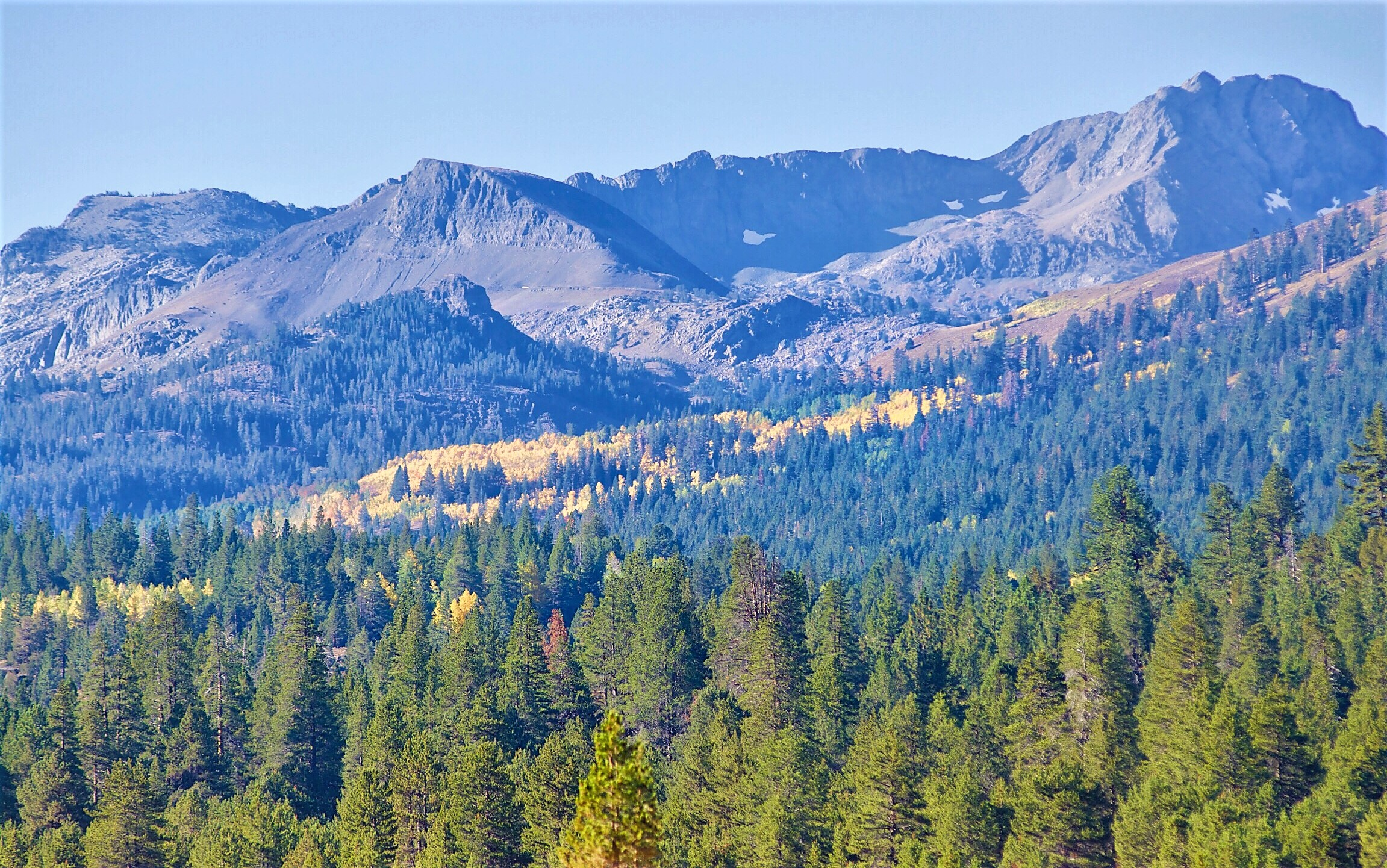
Elephants Back (left) and Round Top (right) seen from Hope Valley.

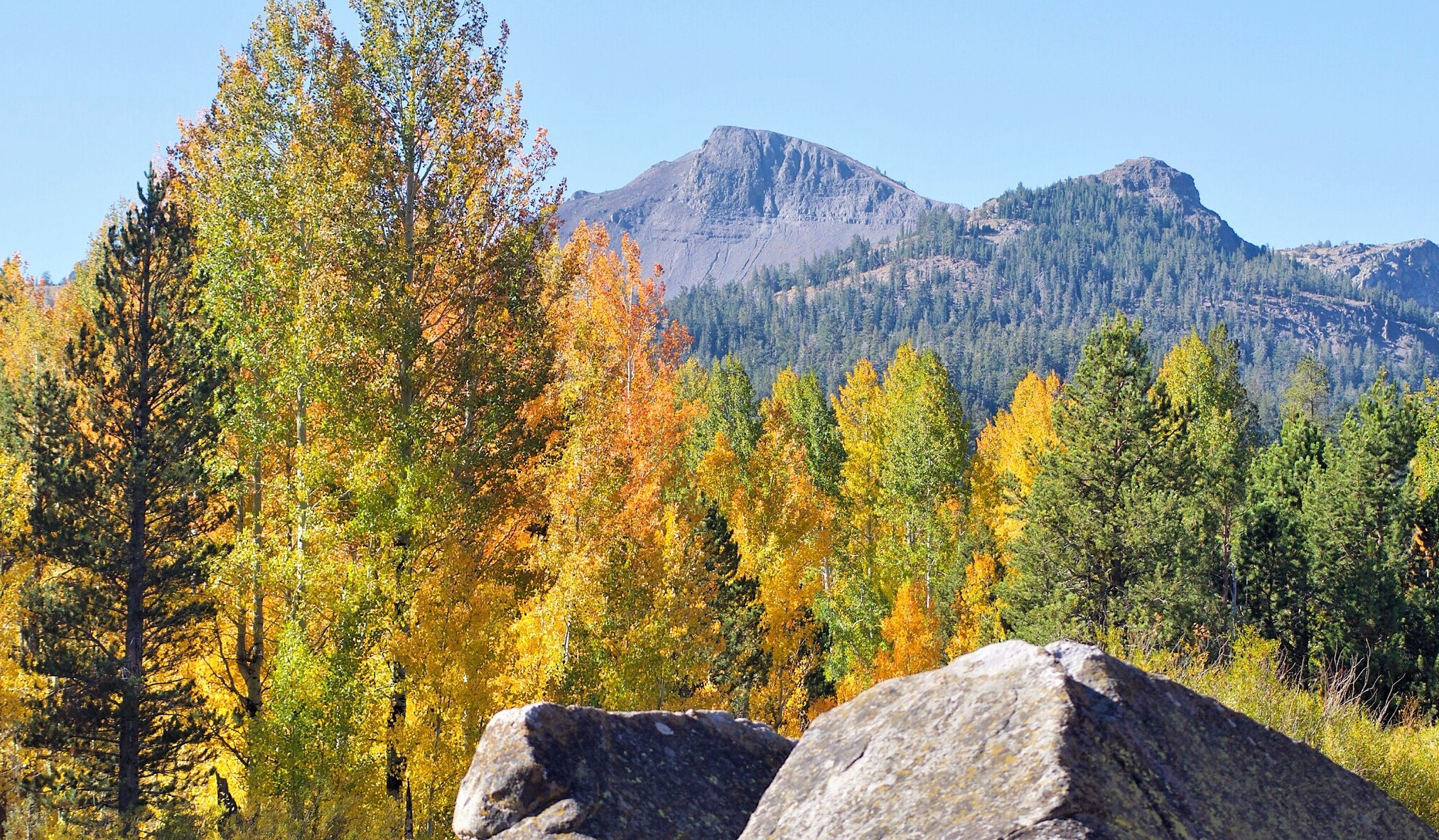
East aspect

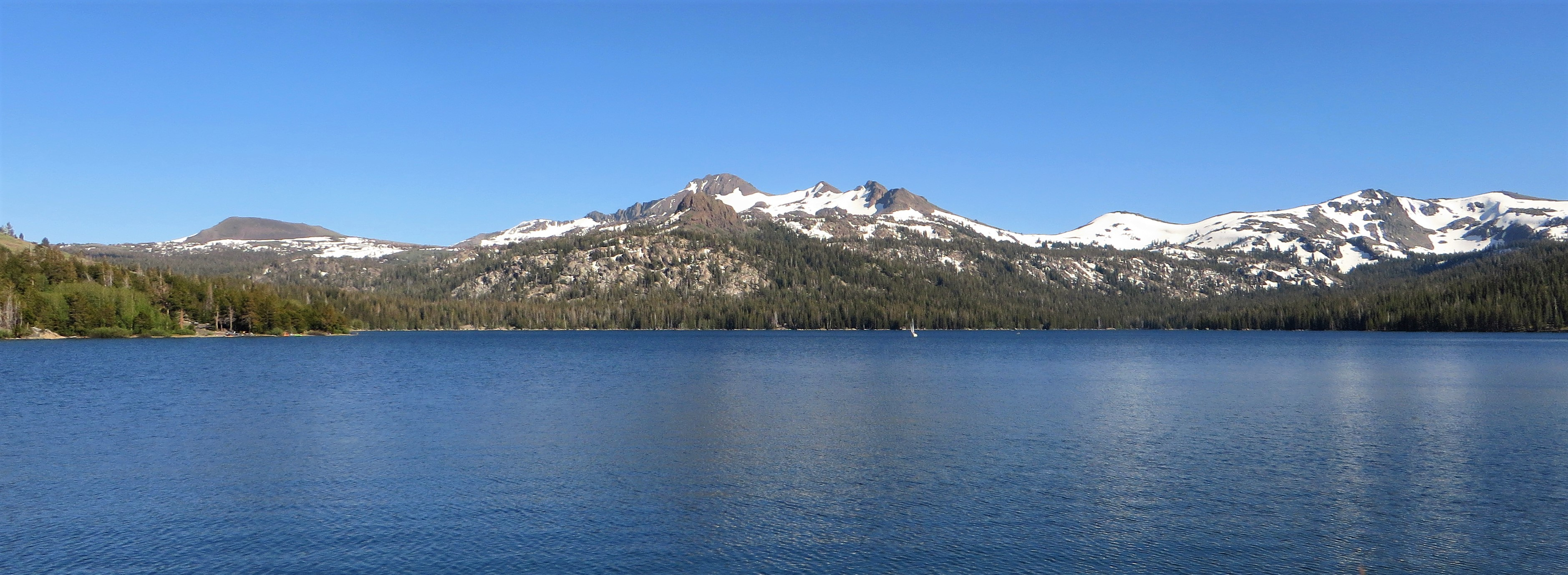
Caples Lake with Elephants Back to left and Round Top centered.

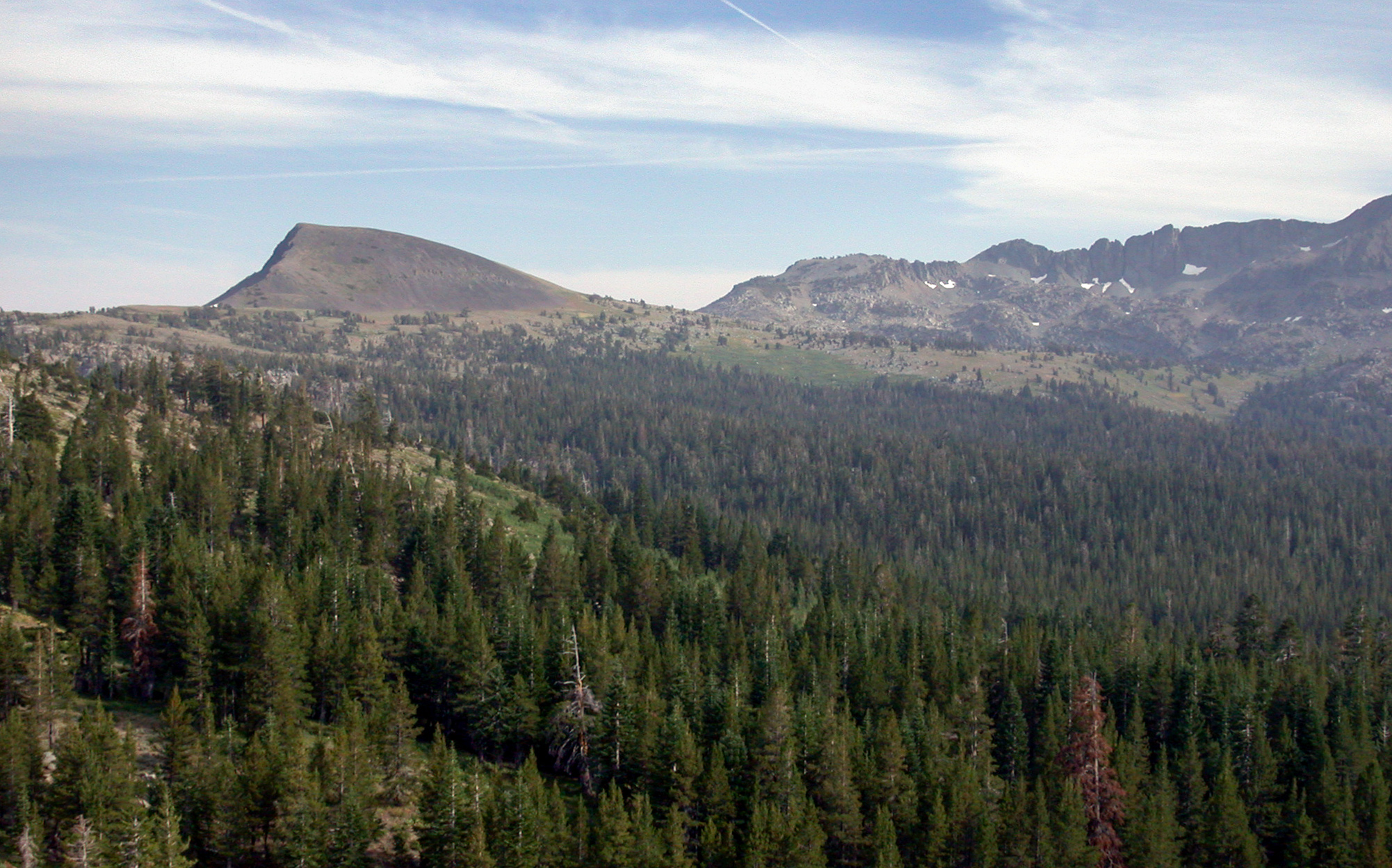
Elephants Back to left

== See also ==
- Stevens Peak
- Red Lake Peak
