= Mokelumne Wilderness =

Protected wilderness area in California, United States

- IUCN category Ib (wilderness area)
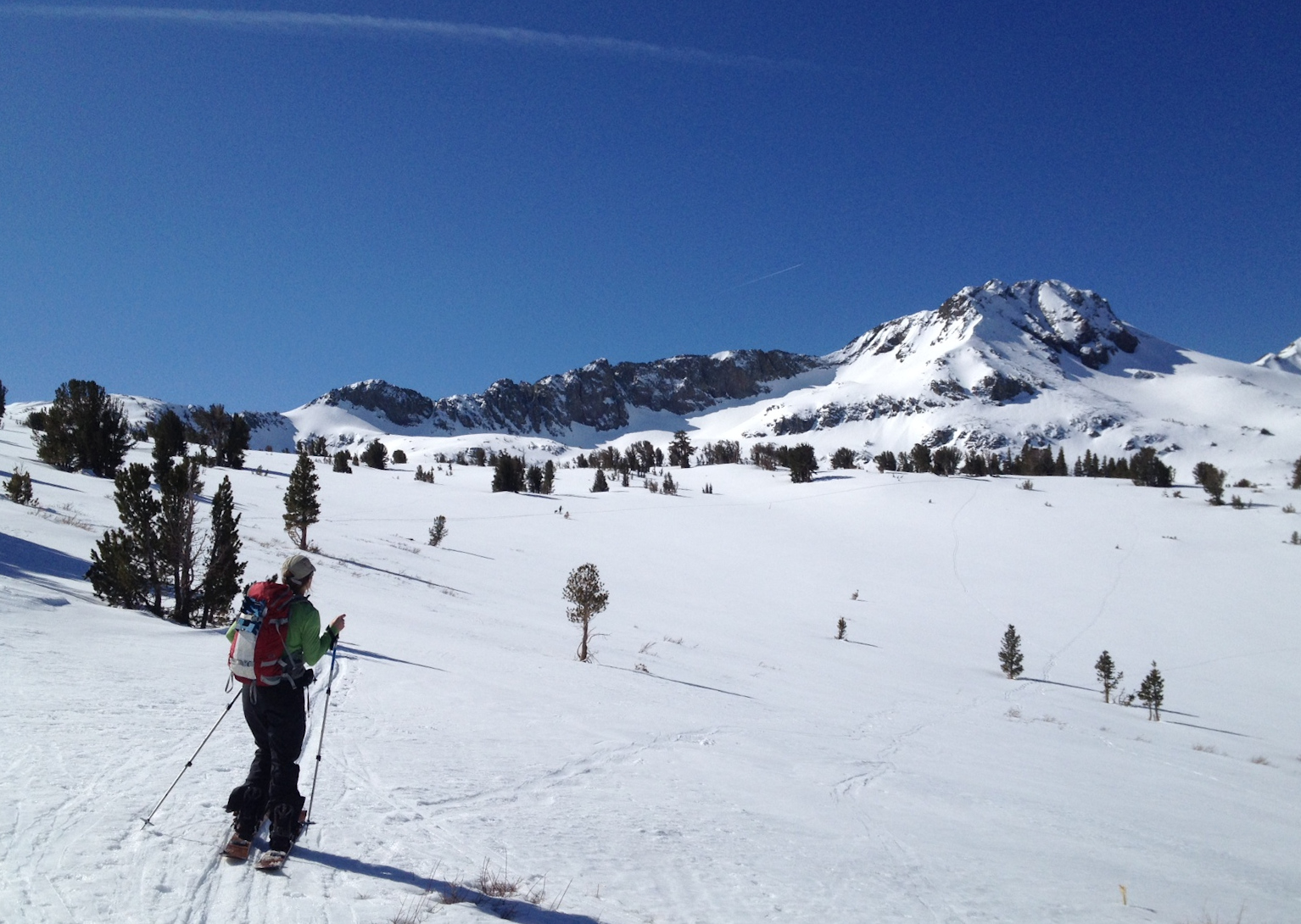
- Round Top Peak in the Mokelumne Wilderness

- Location within California Location within the United States
- Interactive map of Mokelumne Wilderness
- Location: Sierra Nevada Mountain Range, Alpine / Amador / Calaveras counties, California, United States
- Nearest city: South Lake Tahoe, California (north), Markleeville, California (east)
- Coordinates: 38°35′00″N 119°58′43″W
- Area: 105,165 acres (425.59 km^{2})
- Established: 1964
- Governing body: U.S. Forest Service

The Mokelumne Wilderness is a 105,165-acre (164 sq mi; 426 km^{2}) federally designated wilderness area located 70 miles (110 km) east of Sacramento, California. It is within the boundaries of three national forests: Stanislaus, Eldorado and Toiyabe. First protected under the Wilderness Act of 1964, the Mokelumne's borders were expanded under the California Wilderness Act of 1984 with the addition of 55,000 acres. The wilderness takes its name from the Mokelumne River, which was named after a Mi-wok Indian village located on the riverbank in California's Central Valley.

The wilderness encompasses an area of the Sierra Nevada mountain range between Ebbetts Pass and Carson Pass. There are two sections separated by the Blue Lakes Road and an Off-Road Vehicle corridor.

Elevations range from 4,000 feet (1,200 m) to 10,381 feet (3,164 m). The highest point is Round Top (10,364 feet), a remnant volcano from which the wilderness area's volcanic soils are derived.

== Landscape, flora and fauna ==
The west slopes have been eroded by glaciation and water down to the granite bedrock which has created a dramatic contrast between the volcanic and the granitic landscapes.

The wilderness protects habitat for a great variety of plants and animals especially on the slopes of Round Top, which is designated a special interest area. Plants include Ponderosa pine, canyon live oak as well as alpine vegetation of Whitebark pine, subalpine fir, and western juniper, with western white pine, mountain hemlock, and lodgepole pine found in sheltered areas. Waterways such as the North Fork of the Mokelumne River have riparian zones of white and mountain alder, creek dogwood, western azalea and bitter cherry. Wildlife include the black bear and mule deer, as well as martin, bald eagle and the California spotted owl.

=== Areas of special interest ===
The Round Top Botanical Area is at the junction of three botanical provinces and includes red fir forest, sagebrush scrub, subalpine and alpine environments. The combination of soil types, varying exposure and elevations produce diverse plant life, such as the phantom orchid (Cephalanthera austiniae), a rare parasitic plant. The plant's common name is due to its color being all or mostly white.

The Round Top Geologic Area has more than 3,000 acres (12 km^{2}) within the wilderness and encompasses a variety of geological areas, including exposed granodiorite, lava flows, dikes, glacial moraines and cirques. The landform known as Elephants Back is a rounded mass of solidified lava. Mineralization produced gold-bearing quartz veins, and relics of past gold mining activities are still present in the area.

== Climate ==
The Wilderness experiences a warm summer Mediterranean to subarctic climates. Snow can be found at all elevations with more the higher you go especially around the crests.

Climate data for Blue Lakes, California, 1991–2020 normals, 1983–2020 extremes: 8057ft (2456m)
Month	Jan	Feb	Mar	Apr	May	Jun	Jul	Aug	Sep	Oct	Nov	Dec	Year
Record high °F (°C)	59 (15)	64 (18)	76 (24)	79 (26)	90 (32)	93 (34)	94 (34)	92 (33)	83 (28)	77 (25)	66 (19)	58 (14)	94 (34)
Mean maximum °F (°C)	50.2 (10.1)	50.9 (10.5)	56.6 (13.7)	61.5 (16.4)	67.4 (19.7)	75.0 (23.9)	79.6 (26.4)	78.6 (25.9)	74.6 (23.7)	67.2 (19.6)	57.9 (14.4)	50.4 (10.2)	80.7 (27.1)
Mean daily maximum °F (°C)	36.5 (2.5)	37.1 (2.8)	41.9 (5.5)	46.0 (7.8)	53.3 (11.8)	62.9 (17.2)	71.2 (21.8)	70.3 (21.3)	64.3 (17.9)	53.5 (11.9)	42.5 (5.8)	35.6 (2.0)	51.3 (10.7)
Daily mean °F (°C)	26.6 (−3.0)	26.6 (−3.0)	30.5 (−0.8)	34.4 (1.3)	41.6 (5.3)	50.3 (10.2)	58.6 (14.8)	58.0 (14.4)	52.5 (11.4)	43.0 (6.1)	33.4 (0.8)	26.2 (−3.2)	40.1 (4.5)
Mean daily minimum °F (°C)	16.7 (−8.5)	16.0 (−8.9)	19.1 (−7.2)	22.7 (−5.2)	29.8 (−1.2)	37.6 (3.1)	45.8 (7.7)	45.7 (7.6)	40.7 (4.8)	32.5 (0.3)	24.3 (−4.3)	16.8 (−8.4)	29.0 (−1.7)
Mean minimum °F (°C)	−1.9 (−18.8)	−1.0 (−18.3)	1.0 (−17.2)	7.2 (−13.8)	18.1 (−7.7)	27.2 (−2.7)	38.0 (3.3)	38.2 (3.4)	30.5 (−0.8)	20.8 (−6.2)	10.2 (−12.1)	0.0 (−17.8)	−7.4 (−21.9)
Record low °F (°C)	−16 (−27)	−18 (−28)	−9 (−23)	−7 (−22)	6 (−14)	16 (−9)	28 (−2)	30 (−1)	5 (−15)	2 (−17)	−7 (−22)	−21 (−29)	−21 (−29)
Average precipitation inches (mm)	7.63 (194)	6.89 (175)	6.32 (161)	4.08 (104)	2.23 (57)	0.84 (21)	0.45 (11)	0.35 (8.9)	0.72 (18)	2.23 (57)	4.08 (104)	7.13 (181)	42.95 (1,091.9)
Average extreme snow depth inches (cm)	55.9 (142)	70.8 (180)	79.7 (202)	69.8 (177)	49.0 (124)	17.8 (45)	0.8 (2.0)	0.0 (0.0)	0.3 (0.76)	3.9 (9.9)	15.0 (38)	38.0 (97)	85.1 (216)
Average precipitation days (≥ 0.01 in)	12.2	12.8	14.6	12.2	8.4	3.7	2.3	1.7	3.0	5.8	9.8	13.1	99.6
Source 1: XMACIS2 (1999-2020 snow depth)
Source 2: NOAA (Precipitation)

== Mountain Peaks ==
There are several mountains in the wilderness including these named peaks:

1. Round Top (10,381 ft)
2. The Sisters (10,153 ft and 10,045 ft)
3. Raymond Peak (10,014 ft)
4. Deadwood Peak (9,846 ft)
5. Melissa Coray Peak (9,763 ft)
6. Reynolds Peak (9,679 ft)
7. Little Round Top (9,590 ft)
8. Elephants Back (9,585 ft)
9. Fourth of July Peak (9,537 ft)
10. Markleeville Peak (9,415 ft)
11. The Nipple (9,342 ft)
12. Mokelumne Peak (9,334 ft)
13. Da-ek Dow Go-et Mountain (formerly Jeff Davis Peak) (9,065 ft)
14. Black Butte (9,013 ft)
15. Thornburg Peak (8,636 ft)

This is not a complete list and only includes non-numbered named peaks above 8,600 ft elevation in the wilderness.

== Recreation ==
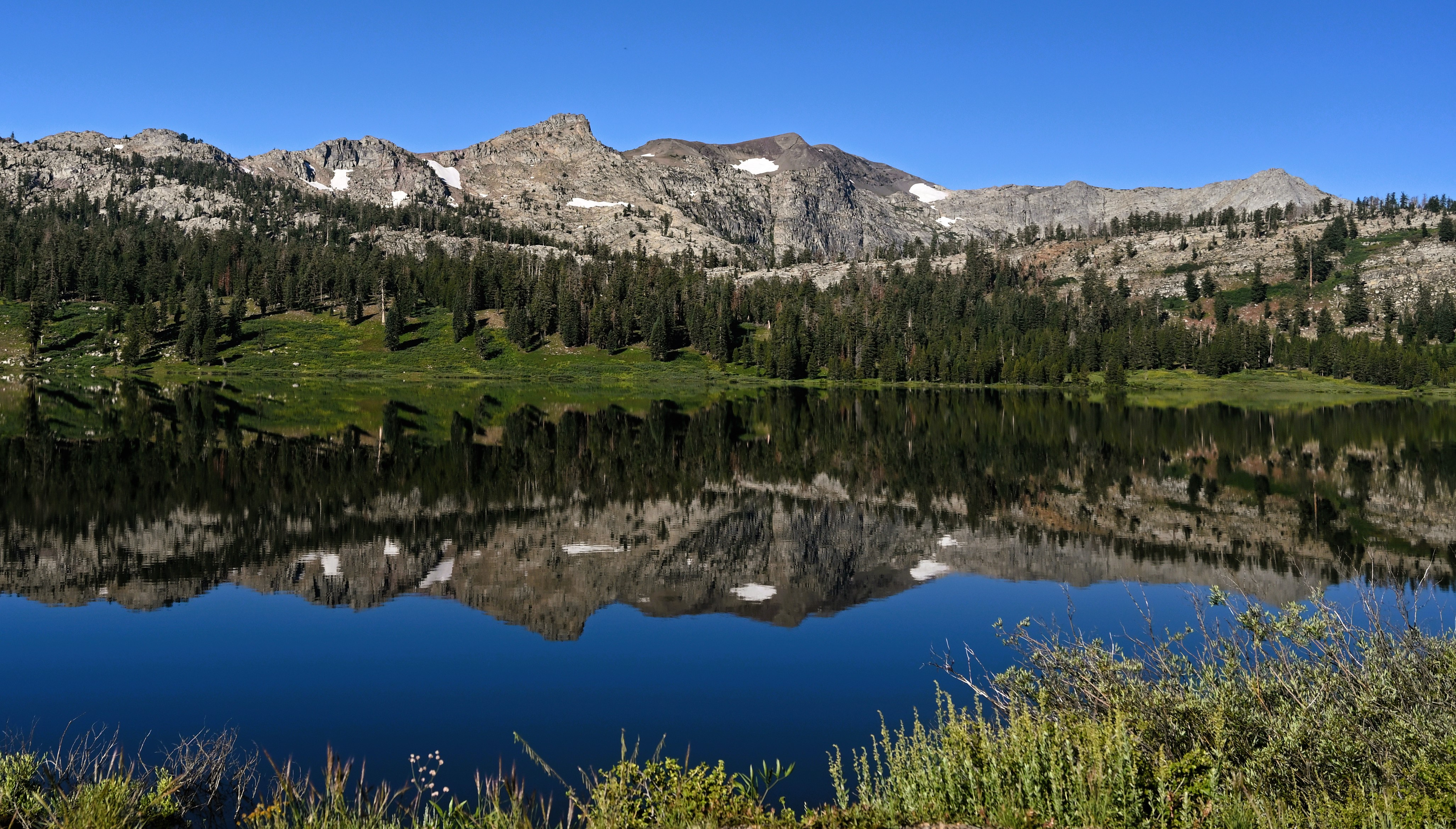
Deadwood Peak above Upper Blue Lake

The Mokelumne Wilderness has a variety of recreational opportunities all year. With landscapes ranging from deep canyons to alpine heights and more than two hundred ice-scoured lakes and tarns, fishing and hiking are popular activities as well as cross country skiing. Access is from roads surrounding the wilderness boundary with Carson Pass being the most used entry point. The Pacific Crest Trail, the Tahoe–Yosemite Trail and the Emigrant Summit Trail all cross through the Mokelumne Wilderness. The Emigrant Summit Trail is a designated National Recreation and Historic Trail that follows the western boundary and then passes through the wilderness from Emigrant Valley to Caples Lake.

Wilderness permits are required year-round for overnight visits.
