= Caples Lake =

Reservoir in California

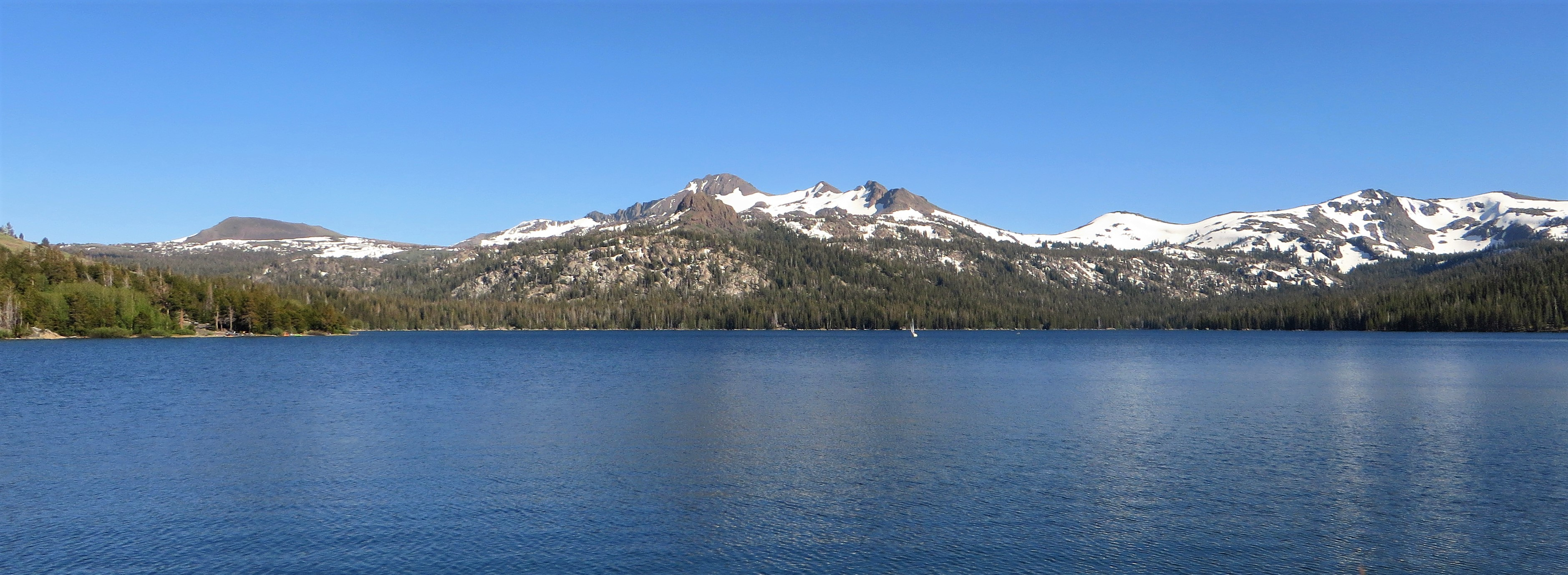
- View from Caples Lake with Elephants Back to left and Round Top centered.

- Location within California
- Location: Alpine County, California
- Coordinates: 38°41′55″N 120°02′44″W
- Primary inflows: Woods Creek
- Primary outflows: Caples Creek
- Basin countries: United States
- Max. length: 2 miles (3.2 km)
- Surface area: 600 acres (2.4 km^{2})
- Max. depth: 62 feet (19 m)
- Surface elevation: 7,802 ft (2,378 m)

Caples Lake is a reservoir that is located near Kirkwood, California along California State Route 88 (also known as the Carson Pass Highway). The lake was used as a halting place for wagon travelers who were trekking the historic Mormon Trail during the California Gold Rush. The lake has been used by many different groups of people including Native Americans, 49ers, and resort owners, so it has been known by different names. The variant names are Clear Lake, Summit Lake, and Twin Lakes. Currently, Caples Lake is a reservoir used for water and recreation. Woods Creek and Emigrant Creek both flow into Caples Lake, which drains into Caples Creek. Caples Creek meets up with the South Fork of the American River. It is operated by the El Dorado Irrigation District (EID), who is using it as part of the Hydroelectric Project 184 system.

== El Dorado Irrigation District Management ==
The EID obtained the license for Project 184 (the El Dorado Hydroelectric Project) in 2006, and it had requirements that the EID monitor flows, recreation, and environmental conditions within their system. The EID also manages the recreational facilities at Caples Lake, such as the boat launch, day use areas, and bathrooms with the help of the Eldorado National Forest as part of the license agreement. The Project 184 system has four reservoirs, including Caples Lake, a diversion dam along the South Fork of the American River, and a hydropower facility located at Forbay Reservoir. The water that gets diverted goes through the El Dorado Canal which brings water to Forbay Reservoir. That water is used to generate power at the El Dorado Powerhouse for Pacific Gas and Electric (PG&E) and provides some consumptive water for the El Dorado Irrigation District.

== History ==
The Washoe people occupied the area before the gold rush attracted many new settlers. The Washoe people referred to Caples Lake as Twin Lakes because the area was historically an open meadow with two shallow lakes that they were able to fish, hunt, and forage around. The next person to occupy the area was Dr. James Caples, who passed by the lake in 1849 on his trek to the gold country. He later returned and bought the area that is now Caples Lake to raise cattle and set up a trading post for travelers that was around for thirty years. The way-station could only be opened up during the summer months due to its high elevation but it still served as a very important stop for 49ers, which is why the lake was named after Dr. Caples. Caples Dam was originally constructed in 1922 by damming up Caples Creek. After the gold rush ended, the way-station transitioned into a resort for travelers. A man named Ray Koenig was the first to construct a resort in 1948, however, he owned it before California State Route 88 was built, so he had to ski all the way from California State Route 50 to set up the resort each year. Since Koenig, there have been several owners of the resort who made improvements to the lodging and dam and tried to keep it running during the winter. The opening of Kirkwood Mountain Resort in 1972 allowed California State Route 88 to remain open as a winter travel route, making it easier for the resort to remain open year-round. The Caples Lake resort is currently owned by the Voss family, who keep it open during the winter months.

== Recreation ==
Caples Lake is located in the Eldorado National Forest, meaning that there are a variety of different recreational opportunities such as hiking, fishing, and skiing within close proximity. The California Department of Fish and Wildlife (CDFW) has reports of stocking Caples Lake with fish for recreational fishing dating back to 1930. Currently, the regulations for Caples Lake state that fishermen are only allowed to take home five trout that are a minimum of ten inches each. Both the CDFW and the EID stock Caples lake with rainbow trout and brown trout. Caples Lake also supports a few non-stocked species such as the Lahontan redsides, the tui chub, and the lake trout. There is year-round fishing at Caples Lake, boat access in the summer and ice fishing in the winter. There are also many trailheads located near Caples Lake that enter into Mokelumne Wilderness. The names of the trailheads are Lake Margaret Trailhead, Meiss Lake Trailhead, Thunder Mountain Trailhead, Frog Lake Trailhead (also called Roundtop Trailhead), and Shealor Lake Trailhead. The access for these trailheads are also along California State Route 88.

== Climate ==
Caples Lake has a humid continental climate (Dsb according to the Köppen climate classification), with warm, dry summers and cold, snowy winters due to the high elevation.

Climate data for Caples Lake, California, 1981–2010 normals, extremes 1924–2000
Month	Jan	Feb	Mar	Apr	May	Jun	Jul	Aug	Sep	Oct	Nov	Dec	Year
Record high °F (°C)	64 (18)	66 (19)	70 (21)	78 (26)	82 (28)	92 (33)	95 (35)	91 (33)	88 (31)	83 (28)	72 (22)	70 (21)	95 (35)
Mean daily maximum °F (°C)	40.0 (4.4)	39.7 (4.3)	43.9 (6.6)	48.6 (9.2)	57.3 (14.1)	65.7 (18.7)	73.8 (23.2)	72.7 (22.6)	67.1 (19.5)	56.6 (13.7)	45.9 (7.7)	40.1 (4.5)	54.3 (12.4)
Daily mean °F (°C)	28.7 (−1.8)	28.0 (−2.2)	31.2 (−0.4)	35.3 (1.8)	43.2 (6.2)	51.3 (10.7)	58.0 (14.4)	57.3 (14.1)	51.8 (11.0)	42.6 (5.9)	33.8 (1.0)	28.4 (−2.0)	40.8 (4.9)
Mean daily minimum °F (°C)	17.4 (−8.1)	16.4 (−8.7)	18.5 (−7.5)	22.3 (−5.4)	29.0 (−1.7)	37.0 (2.8)	42.3 (5.7)	42.0 (5.6)	36.6 (2.6)	28.6 (−1.9)	21.7 (−5.7)	16.7 (−8.5)	27.4 (−2.6)
Record low °F (°C)	−26 (−32)	−24 (−31)	−18 (−28)	−14 (−26)	−4 (−20)	7 (−14)	20 (−7)	20 (−7)	10 (−12)	1 (−17)	−9 (−23)	−19 (−28)	−26 (−32)
Average precipitation inches (mm)	7.08 (180)	7.84 (199)	6.32 (161)	3.41 (87)	2.72 (69)	0.97 (25)	0.44 (11)	0.62 (16)	1.16 (29)	2.93 (74)	6.04 (153)	7.48 (190)	47.01 (1,194)
Average snowfall inches (cm)	73.5 (187)	61.8 (157)	72.4 (184)	32.5 (83)	7.0 (18)	1.8 (4.6)	0.0 (0.0)	0.0 (0.0)	2.4 (6.1)	10.8 (27)	47.1 (120)	65.7 (167)	375.0 (953)
Average precipitation days (≥ 0.01 in)	10.7	9.9	9.7	7.1	7.2	4.5	2.4	2.3	5.2	5.2	9.5	10.1	83.8
Average snowy days (≥ 0.1 in)	10.2	9.0	8.7	5.5	2.4	0.8	0.0	0.0	0.9	2.1	7.5	9.4	56.5
Source 1: NOAA
Source 2: XMACIS2
