= Round Top (Alpine County, California) =

Mountain in Alpine County, California, United States

Coordinates: 38°39′49″N 120°00′05″W

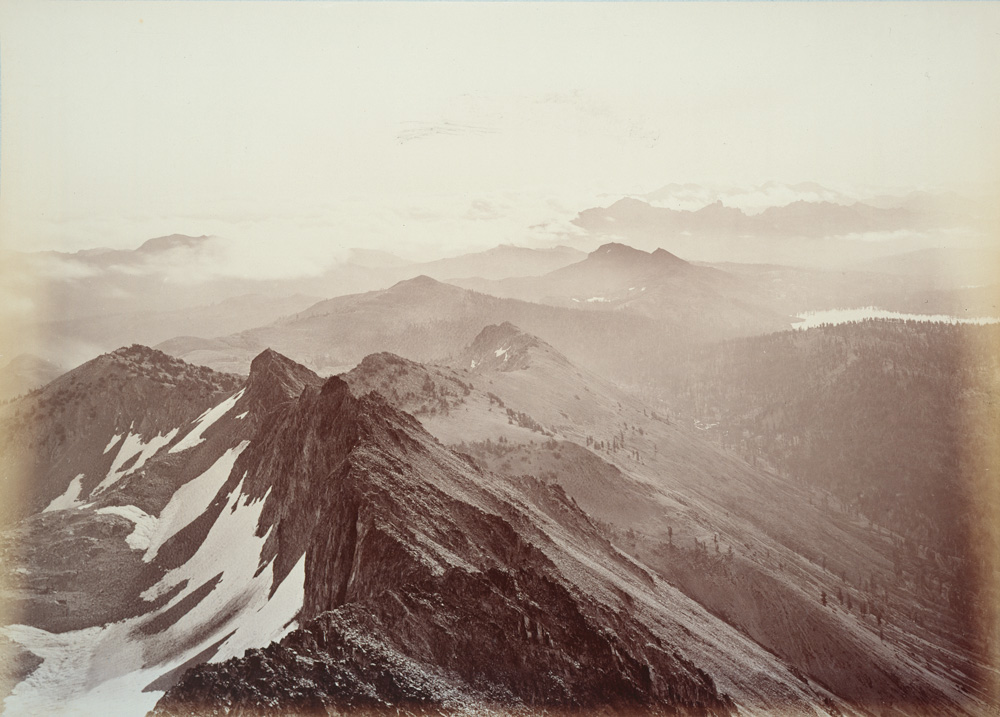
- View to the west from the summit of Round Top. Carleton Watkins, 1879.

Highest point
- Elevation: 10,381 feet (3,164 m)
- Prominence: 2,541 feet (774 m)
- Parent peak: Highland Peak
- Isolation: 13.66 miles (21.98 km) to Freel Peak
- Listing: Sierra Peaks Section

Geography
- Parent range: Sierra Nevada

Geology
- Mountain type: Volcano
- Volcanic arc: Sierra Nevada
- Last eruption: 5 million years ago

Round Top is a 10,381-foot (3,164 m) mountain located on the Sierra crest in Alpine County, California, United States. Its summit is the highest point in Eldorado National Forest and the Mokelumne Wilderness. The mountain lies just south of Carson Pass. With 2,541 feet (774 m) of prominence, Round Top is the 16th most prominent mountain in the Sierra Nevada.

== Geology ==
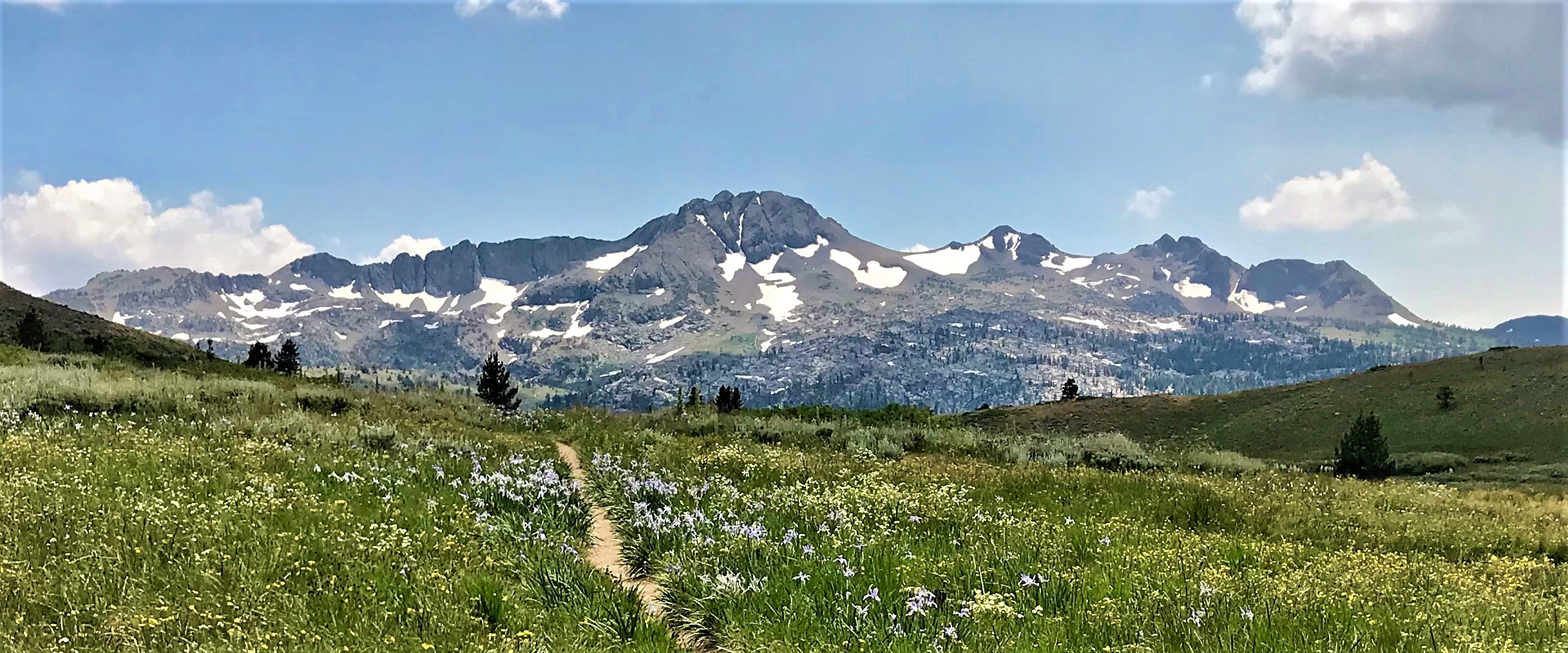
Round Top, north aspect

Round Top is the remnant of a volcano that formed in the Miocene epoch, which lasted from c. 23 million years ago to c. 5 million years ago. Most of the mountain's vertical height consists of an intrusive volcanic plug formed of basaltic andesite. This intrusive structure formed under the volcano's surface as subsurface magma gradually cooled and solidified. Approximately 3,000 feet (910 m) is exposed by the northern wall of Summit City canyon, which forms the south face of the mountain. A strong magnetic anomaly in the vicinity indicates that this plug further extends far below the canyon floor. The upper layers of the mountain are made up of extrusive rocks, which formed at the surface. A succession of lava flows form the bulk of these upper layers. Some solidified mudflows are also present. The rock that forms Round Top was more resistant to erosion than other strata of the volcano. Eventually, over a geologic time scale, these other strata wore away, revealing the erosion-resistant remnants which make up the mountain that remains today. It has a flank lava dome, called Elephants Back.

== Ecology ==
The north slope of Round Top is home to a number of tree species, most prominently whitebark pine, western white pine, and lodgepole pine. The summit of the mountain rises above the tree line. Western white pine and lodgepole pine grow up to about 8,960 feet (2,730 m). The whitebark pine survives in the form of short, stubby krummholz to as high as 9,650 feet (2,940 m). A specimen of the Lake Tahoe lupine (Lupinus meionanthus) has been identified at the summit of Round Top.

== History ==
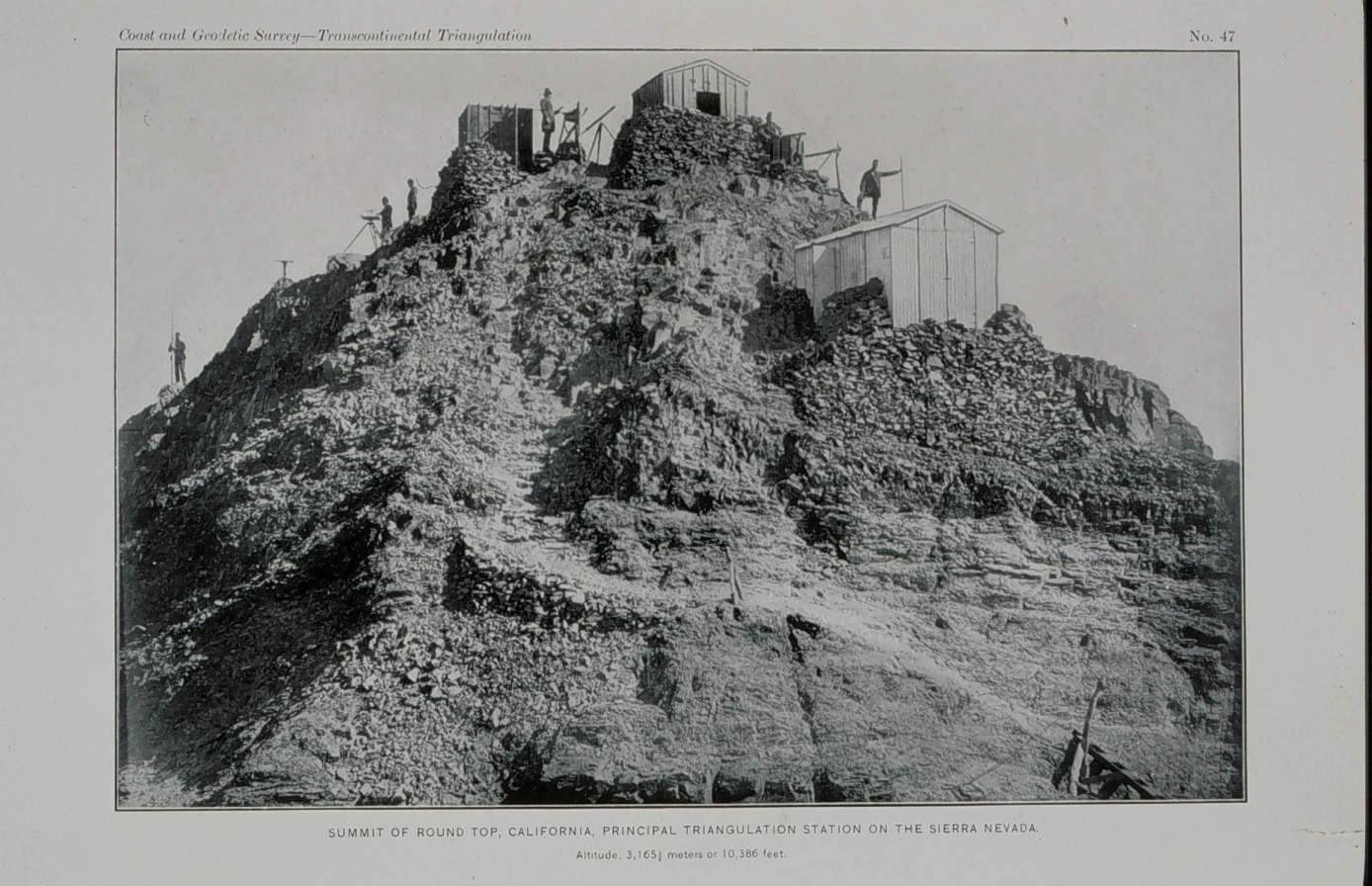
Summit of Round Top, California, Principal Triangulation Station on the Sierra Nevada. 1876. Astro and triangulation party of George Davidson. California.

In 1872, prospectors began exploring the Summit City Creek canyon immediately south of Round Top, ultimately filing more than 30 mining claims in the area. At some point before 1879, George Davidson of the United States Coast and Geodetic Survey established a geodetic station on the summit of the mountain, as part of a chain of such stations atop peaks along the Sierra crest.

== Climbing ==
Round Top is listed on the Sierra Peaks Section peak list. Reaching the summit requires a YDS class 3 ascent. The circumstances of the first ascent are unknown.
