= California State Route 49 =

Highway in California

State Route 49
- Golden Chain Highway
- SR 49 highlighted in red

Route information
- Maintained by Caltrans
- Length: 295.065 mi (474.861 km) SR 49 has three route breaks, and the length given above does not include the SR 120, SR 20, and SR 89 overlap mileages.
- Existed: 1934–present
- Tourist routes: Yuba-Donner Scenic Byway

Major junctions
- South end: SR 41 at Oakhurst
- SR 140 at Mariposa; SR 120 from Moccasin to Chinese Camp; SR 108 from near Jamestown to Sonora; SR 4 in Angels Camp; SR 88 from Jackson to Martell; SR 104 in Sutter Creek; US 50 in Placerville; I-80 in Auburn; SR 20 from Grass Valley to Nevada City; SR 89 from near Sattley to Sierraville
- North end: SR 70 at Vinton

Location
- Country: United States
- State: California
- Counties: Madera, Mariposa, Tuolumne, Calaveras, Amador, El Dorado, Placer, Nevada, Yuba, Sierra, Plumas

Highway system
- State highways in California; Interstate; US; State; Scenic; History; Pre‑1964; Unconstructed; Deleted; Freeways
← SR 48	→ US 50

State Route 49 (SR 49) is a north–south state highway in California that travels through the historic mining communities of the California gold rush of 1849. It is known as the Golden Chain Highway, and the road was initially lobbied for in 1919 by the Mother Lode Highway Association, a group of locals and historians. The highway begins at State Route 41 in Oakhurst, Madera County, in the Sierra Nevada, and continues in a generally northwest direction through eleven counties to its northern terminus at State Route 70 in Vinton, Plumas County.

The 295-mile-long (475 km) route passes through dozens of California Historical Landmark sites, including Marshall Gold Discovery State Historic Park, Sutter's Mill, the Empire Mine State Historic Park, and the towns of Placerville, Sonora, and Angels Camp. Segments of the highway are designated as a California Scenic Highway, and the northern portion between Nevada City and Sierraville forms part of the Yuba-Donner Scenic Byway, a National Forest Scenic Byway. SR 49 serves as a heritage and tourist route through California's Mother Lode country.

== Route description ==
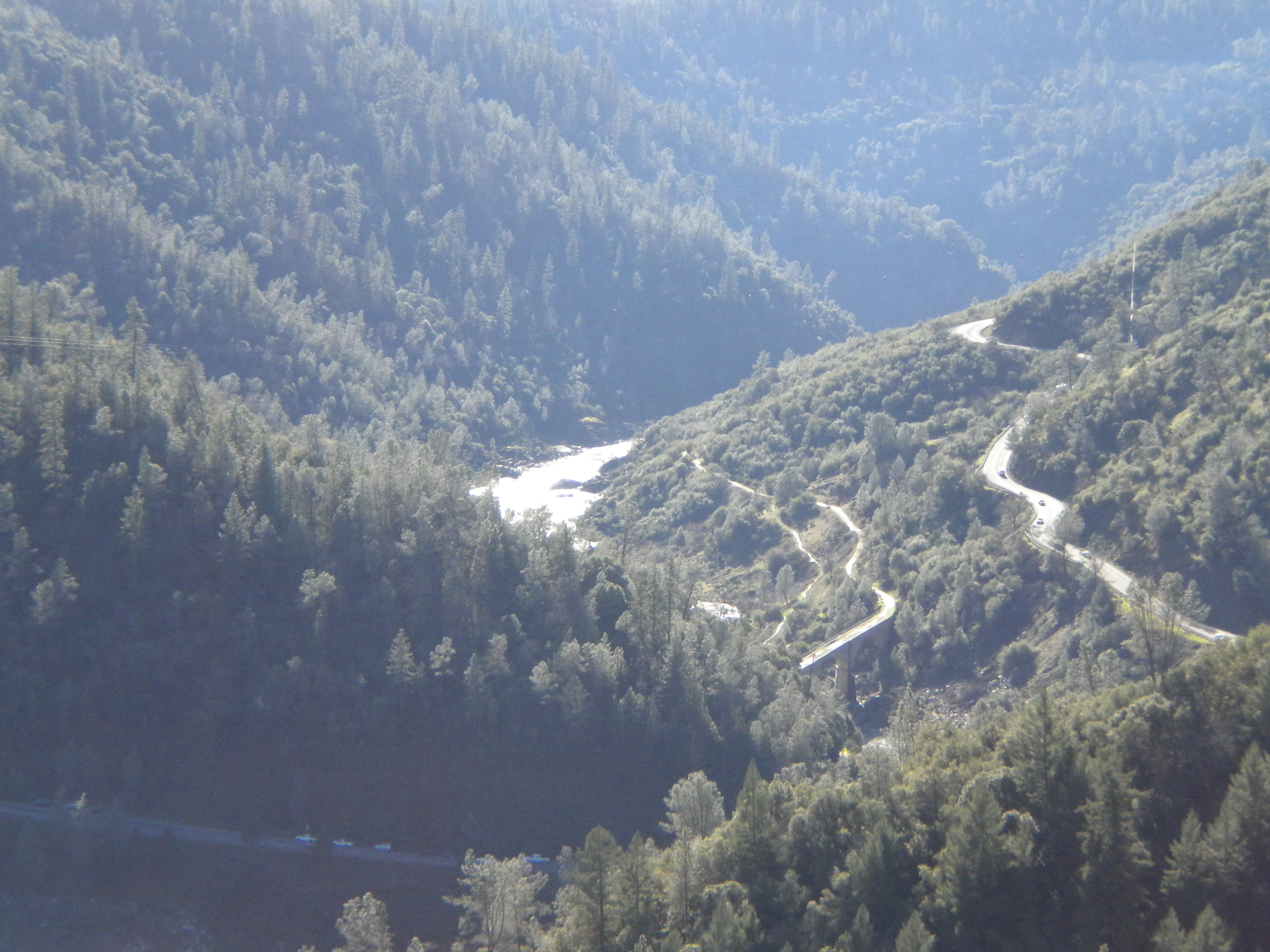
SR 49 crossing the American River North/Middle Fork, as seen from Foresthill Bridge (the SR 49 bridge is not visible)

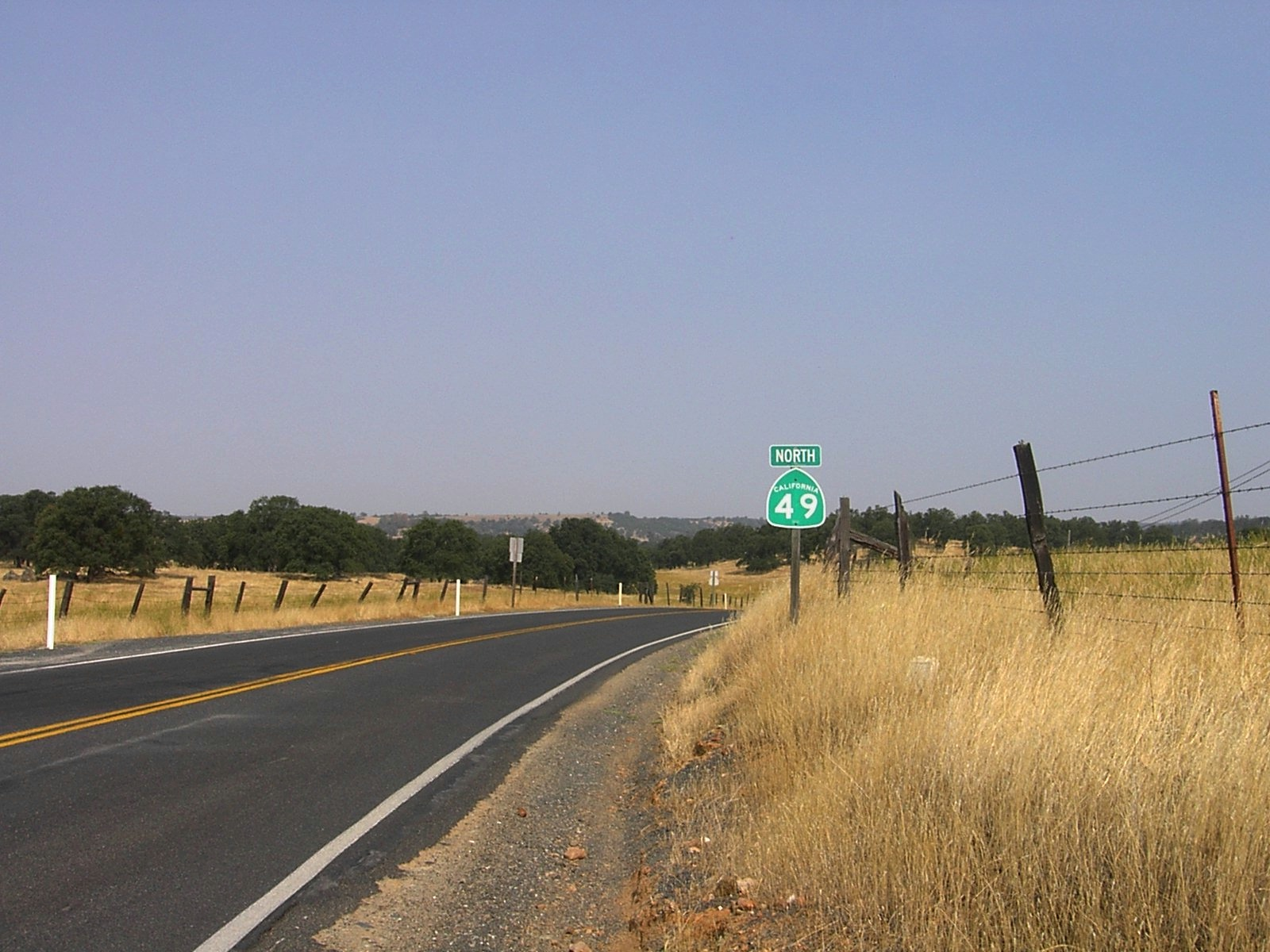
SR 49 in Tuolumne County

Route 45 is defined in section 349, subdivision (a), of the California Streets and Highways Code. The definition omits concurrencies with various other routes instead of duplicating those segments in those other routes' definitions in the code:

Route 49 is from:
(1) Route 41 near Oakhurst to Route 140 at Mariposa.
(2) Route 140 at Mariposa to Route 120 near Moccasin.
(3) Route 120 near Chinese Camp to Route 80 near Auburn via the vicinity of Sonora; via Angels Camp, San Andreas, and Jackson; and via the vicinity of El Dorado, Diamond Springs, and Placerville.
(4) Route 80 near Auburn to Route 20 in Grass Valley.
(5) Route 20 at Nevada City to Route 89 near Sattley via Downieville.
(6) Route 89 near Sierraville to Route 70 near Vinton via Loyalton.

While control of a former routing of the highway in Auburn was relinquished by the state to the city, subdivision (b) further mandates that the city must still "maintain within its jurisdiction signs directing motorists to the continuation of Route 49", and the segment is still eligible to be considered as a state business route.

SR 49 starts at an intersection with SR 41 near Oakhurst. The road heads west before turning north before the town of Ahwahnee near the Wassama Roundhouse State Historic Park. SR 49 continues north, passing through Nipinnswassee before entering Mariposa County and the Sierra National Forest. Continuing to the west, SR 49 passes through Mormon Bar before running concurrently with SR 140 briefly through the town of Mariposa. Near the town of Mount Bullion, SR 49 passes by Mariposa-Yosemite Airport before turning northwest and going through Bear Valley and the intersection with CR J16. The highway passes by the southern edge of Lake McClure and intersects SR 132 in Coulterville before passing into Tuolumne County.

SR 49 continues north through the town of Moccasin, where SR 120 runs concurrently for several miles to the town of Chinese Camp. SR 49 then turns northeast and runs concurrently with SR 108, intersecting CR E5, into the city of Sonora. SR 49 splits from SR 108 and enters downtown Sonora as Stockton Street, turning north onto Washington Street before leaving the Sonora city limits. SR 49 intersects the north end of CR E5 before passing through Tuttletown and crossing into Calaveras County at the bridge over the Stanislaus River.

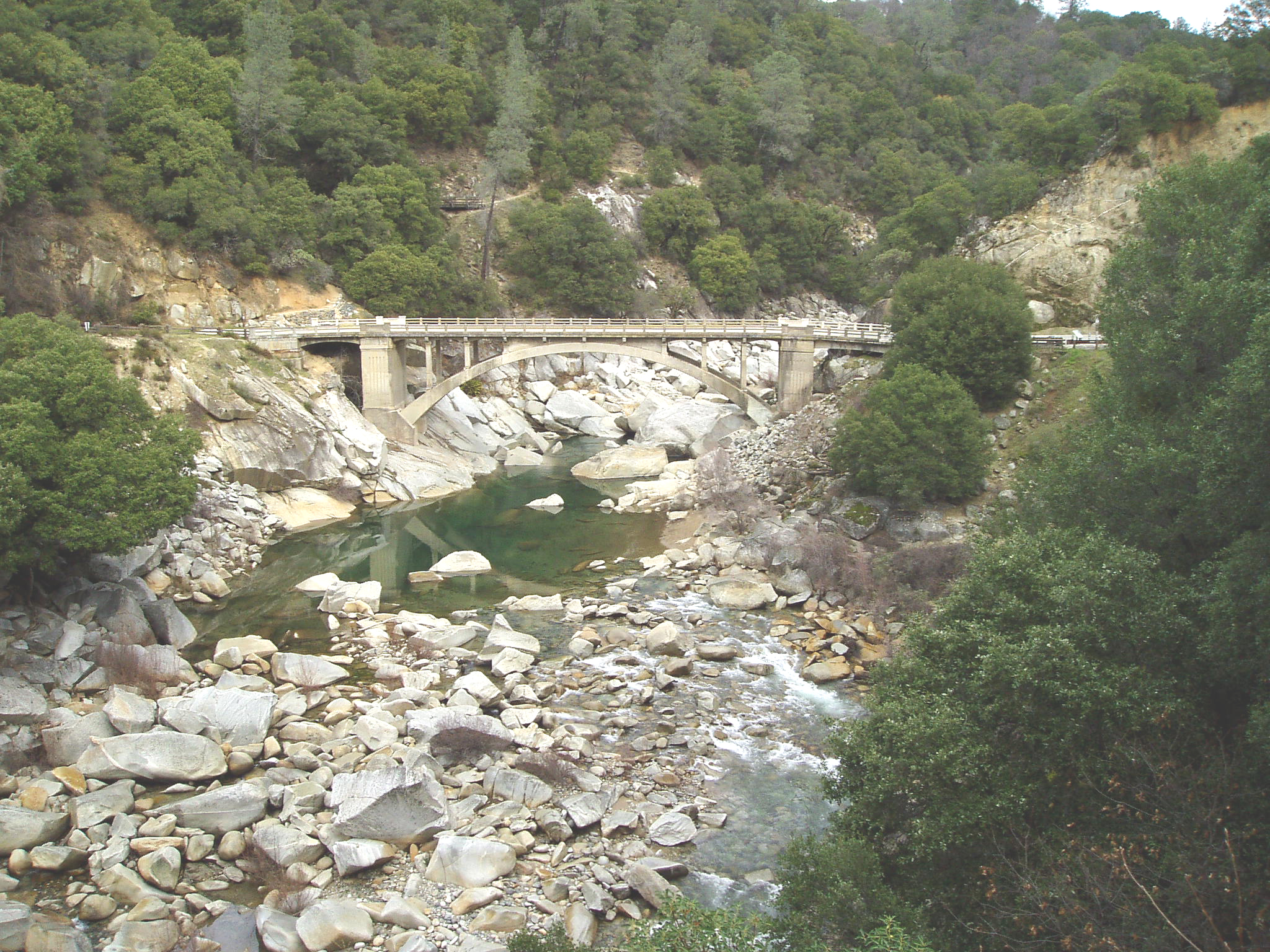
The South Fork of the Yuba River as it intersects with SR 49

SR 49 then enters Carson Hill. Passing by New Melones Lake, SR 49 briefly runs concurrently with SR 4 in the city of Angels Camp.

SR 49 continues through Altaville. The highway continues into San Andreas, where SR 12 terminates. SR 49 continues into Mokelumne Hill, where it intersects with SR 26.

SR 49 then passes through Big Bar and across the Mokelumne River, which is located on the county line between Amador County and Calaveras County. SR 49 then runs concurrently with SR 88 briefly through the town of Martell before intersecting the eastern terminus of SR 104. SR 49 then runs west of Sutter Creek and Amador City, via a bypass around those two cities that was constructed in 2009, before reaching Drytown.

SR 49 then intersects the eastern end of SR 16 before passing through the city of Plymouth. The highway continues through Enterprise before crossing into El Dorado County and passing through the towns of Nashville, El Dorado, and Diamond Springs (the latter two as Pleasant Valley Road) before entering Placerville. SR 49 traverses downtown on Pacific Street and Main Street before continuing onto Spring Street, where it intersects the US 50 expressway at-grade before continuing north as Georgetown Road.

As it leaves the Placerville city limits, SR 49 intersects the southern terminus of SR 193 before continuing northwest as Coloma Road into the town of Coloma. In Coloma, the highway intersects with SR 153, a spur route to the Marshall Gold Discovery State Historic Park. SR 49 then continues through Lotus before turning north at Pilot Hill and intersecting the northern terminus of SR 193 at Cool. SR 49 continues through the Auburn State Recreation Area before crossing into Placer County and entering the city of Auburn as High Street for a short distance before turning west on Elm Avenue. SR 49 continues onto I-80 west at an interchange briefly until the interchange at exit 119B where SR 49 departs from I-80. SR 49 then continues almost due north out of the Auburn city limits.

SR 49 continues north, crossing into Nevada County and passing through Higgins Corner and Forest Springs. SR 49 becomes a freeway and enters the city of Grass Valley, where it then runs concurrently with SR 20 and interchanges with the northern end of SR 174. The SR 49/SR 20 concurrency continues as a freeway into Nevada City. SR 49 then splits from SR 20 at an at-grade intersection just after the freeway ends and heads west out of Nevada City.

SR 49 goes over the South Branch of the Yuba River near the Malakoff Diggins State Historic Park. SR 49 continues through the towns of Sweetland and North San Juan, where it crosses into Yuba County and enters Tahoe National Forest. The route goes through Log Cabin and Camptonville. SR 49 then crosses into Sierra County, where it passes through Goodyears Bar, Downieville, and Sierra City through forested terrain. After passing near Kentucky Mine Historic Park, SR 49 goes through Bassetts and Haskell Creek, then shares a wrong-way concurrency with SR 89 briefly through Sattley and Sierraville. SR 49 then leaves the forest as Loyalton Road, passing through the city of Loyalton and intersecting CR A24 before crossing into Plumas County as Vinton Loyalton Road, where SR 49 ends at SR 70 in the town of Vinton.

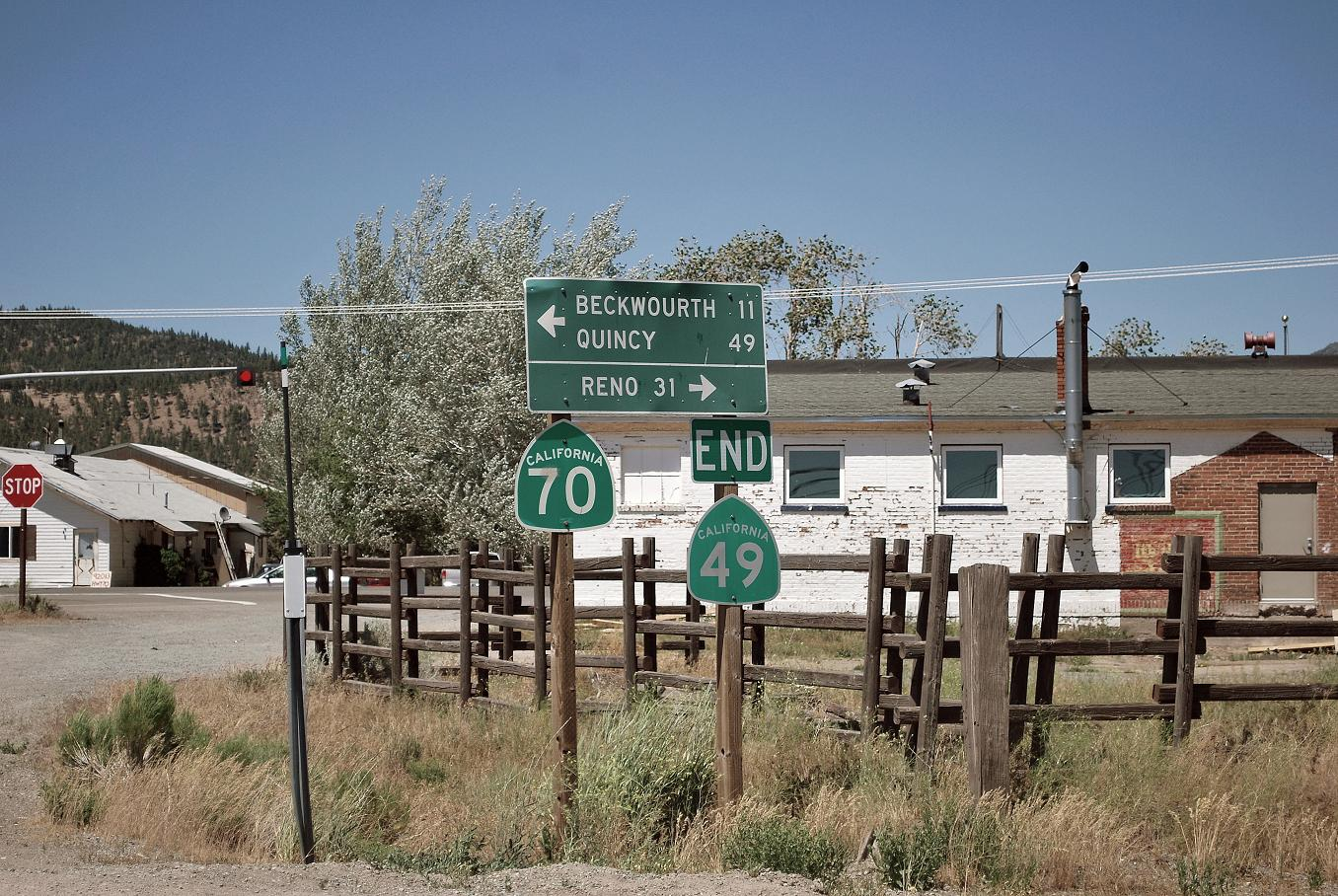
North end of SR 49, at intersection with SR 70 in Vinton

SR 49 is part of the California Freeway and Expressway System, and from SR 140 to a point north of SR 88 as well as from I-80 to SR 20 is part of the National Highway System, a network of highways that are considered important to the country's economy, defense, and mobility by the Federal Highway Administration. SR 49 is eligible to be included in the State Scenic Highway System, and from the Sierra-Yuba county line to Yuba Summit is officially designated as a scenic highway by the California Department of Transportation. The segment of SR 49 from SR 20 in Nevada City to SR 89 in Sierraville also forms part of the Yuba-Donner Scenic Byway, a National Forest Scenic Byway.

SR 49 is known as the Golden Chain Highway for the entire route. SR 49 is known as the John C. Begovich Memorial Highway from Jackson to SR 88 (honoring the California legislator and U.S. Marshal), and the Mother Lode Highway from Sonora to Auburn.

== History ==
In its earliest days, the road was unofficially called The Highway of the 49ers. Beginning in 1919, the Mother Lode Highway Association, a group of locals and historians, lobbied for the creation of a highway to connect many relevant locations to honor the California gold rush and the 49ers. In 1921, the stretch of road from Sonora to Auburn was officially named The Mother Lode Highway. In 1951, the Golden Chain Council of the Mother Lode published a map and tourist guide to the highway, designed and illustrated by Fred Witta, Jr. The publication was called "California's Golden Chain: the Mother Lode Highway (State Highway 49)". In 1960, the organization published a revised version of the map and guide under the same title, this time designed and illustrated by William Wintle. This version covered Calaveras, Amador, El Dorado, Placer, Nevada, Sierra, Tuolumne, Mariposa, and Madera counties.

Like other California state highways, the California State Automobile Association in Northern California and the Automobile Club of Southern California were initially responsible for posting highway route signs, while the state maintained internal "legislative route numbers". In 1963, the entire highway was officially designated as SR 49 after decades of the state using those two separate number systems.

In 2008, the California Legislature authorized the state to relinquish control of a portion of SR 49 through Downtown Auburn. SR 49 originally ran through the city via High Street, Lincoln Way, and Grass Valley Highway. SR 49 was then re-routed to its present-day alignment of High Street, Elm Street, the concurrency with I-80, and Grass Valley Highway.

The Archie Stevenot Bridge, carrying SR 49 over New Melones Lake on the Stanislaus River, was named after Archie Stevenot, founder of the California Chamber of Commerce and officially named "Mr. Mother Lode" by the California State Legislature.

== Historical landmarks ==
The SR 49 corridor was designed to connect historical locations and landmarks of the California gold rush. These include:

Mariposa County

- Mormon Bar was first mined by veterans of the Mormon Battalion in 1849.
- Bear Valley, where John C. Frémont operated his Ride Tree and Josephine Mines between 1850 and 1860.
- Coulterville, where George W. Coulter settled in 1850 and established a tent store to supply miners. The town's Main Street Historic District preserves 24 gold rush-era buildings.

Tuolumne County

- Jacksonville was the principal river town in 1850 for miners working along the Tuolumne River. The site has since been inundated by Don Pedro Reservoir.
- Chinese Camp was the headquarters for stagelines and for several California Chinese mining companies in the 1850s.
- The Wells Fargo Express Company Building in Chinese Camp was built in 1849 and was the home of a general merchandise store.
- Montezuma, a mining town that flourished after a ditch and flume were completed in 1852, bringing in water for placer mining. The town was nearly destroyed by an incendiary fire in 1866.
- Jamestown became known as the gateway to the Mother Lode and the Southern Mines. Large quantities of gold were found from nearby Woods Creek.
- Tuttletown, named after judge A. A. H. Tuttle who settled there 1848, was an early-day stopping place.

Calaveras County

- Robinson's Ferry was established in 1848 to ferry passengers and freight across the Stanislaus River.
- The birthplace of Archie Stevenot, who helped found the California Chamber of Commerce and was officially named "Mr. Mother Lode" by the California legislature in 1961.
- Carson Hill was one of the most productive mining areas in California. The largest gold nugget in the state was discovered here in 1854, weighing 195 pounds troy.
- Angels Camp was founded in 1849 and became one of the richest quartz mining sections of the Mother Lode.
- The Angels Hotel in Angels Camp was originally a canvas tent erected in 1851, replaced by a one-story wooden structure, and then rebuilt with stone in 1855.
- Altaville was the site of a foundry that was established in 1854. Most of the stamp mills and a large portion of the mining machinery erected in Calaveras and Tuolumne Counties were built at this foundry.
- The Prince-Garibaldi Building in Altaville was built in 1852, originally housing a general merchandise business.
- Fourth Crossing became notable in the 1850s for its rich placer ores. The town also served as an important stagecoach and freighting depot, particularly for the Southern Mines.
- San Andreas was originally established as a mining camp by Mexican gold miners in 1848. The gold uncovered from the town's underground river channels and placer mines contributed to the Union's success during the American Civil War.
- Chili Gulch was the richest placer mining section in Calaveras County.
- Mokelumne Hill was the richest placer mining section of Calaveras County and one of the principal mining towns of California.
- Big Bar, along the Mokelumne River, was mined in 1848.

Amador County

- The Butte Store, built in 1857, is the only structure still standing in Butte City.
- Both Argonaut Mine and adjacent Kennedy Mine were discovered in the 1850s and became the highest-yielding gold mines in the state.
- Sutter Creek became a boomtown after quartz gold was discovered in the area in 1851.
- Drytown, founded in 1848, is Amador County's oldest community, and the first in the county in which gold was discovered.

El Dorado County

- El Dorado, originally an important camp on the old Carson Trail, became the center of a mining district by 1849–50 and the crossroads for freight and stagecoach lines.
- Diamond Springs was among the most gold-rich locations in the region, with its most thriving period in 1851.
- Placerville, a gold rush town that also served as a relay station of the Central Overland Pony Express from 1860 to 1861.
- Marshall Gold Discovery State Historic Park, which marks the discovery of gold by James W. Marshall at Sutter's Mill in 1848. Marshall then traveled on Coloma Road to give news of the discovery to John Sutter.

Placer County

- Auburn developed into an important mining town, trading post, and stage terminal after gold was discovered nearby in 1848.

Nevada County

- The former Overland Emigrant Trail, which was used by travelers from points east to the California gold fields, crosses present-day SR 49 near Wolf Creek.
- Empire Mine was in constant operation from 1850 to the late 1950s.
- Gold Hill in Grass Valley was the site of one of the first discoveries of quartz gold in California.

== Major intersections ==
Except where prefixed with a letter, postmiles were measured on the road as it was in 1964, based on the alignment that existed at the time, and do not necessarily reflect current mileage. Postmile prefixes include: R reflecting a realignment in the route since then, M indicating a second realignment, L referring to an overlap due to a correction or change, and T indicating postmiles classified as temporary. Segments that remain unconstructed or have been relinquished to local control may be omitted. The numbers reset at county lines; the start and end postmiles in each county are given in the county column.

County	Location	Postmile	Exit	Destinations	Notes
Madera; MAD 0.00–9.28	Oakhurst	0.00		SR 41 – Yosemite, Fresno	Southern terminus
Mariposa; MPA 0.33–48.84	Mariposa	18.50 21.22 (Note: Indicates that the postmile represents the distance along SR 140 rather than SR 49.)		SR 140 west – Merced	South end of SR 140 overlap
Mariposa; MPA 0.33–48.84	Mariposa	22.00 18.51		SR 140 east / Jones Street – Yosemite	North end of SR 140 overlap
Mariposa; MPA 0.33–48.84	Bear Valley	29.45		CR J16 (Bear Valley Road) – Hornitos, Snelling	Eastern terminus of CR J16
Mariposa; MPA 0.33–48.84	Coulterville	44.67		SR 132 west – La Grange, Modesto	Eastern terminus of SR 132
Mariposa; MPA 0.33–48.84	Coulterville	44.70		CR J132 (Greeley Hill Road) – Greeley Hill, Yosemite National Park	Western terminus of CR J132
Tuolumne; TUO 0.00–R27.52	Moccasin	R6.47 R23.90 (Note: Indicates that the postmile represents the distance along SR 120 rather than SR 49.)		SR 120 east – Yosemite	South end of SR 120 overlap
Tuolumne; TUO 0.00–R27.52	Tuolumne River / Don Pedro Reservoir	R19.61		James E. Roberts Bridge	
Tuolumne; TUO 0.00–R27.52	Chinese Camp	15.52 R8.78		SR 120 west – Oakdale	North end of SR 120 overlap
Tuolumne; TUO 0.00–R27.52		R11.59		SR 108 west – Modesto	South end of SR 108 overlap
Tuolumne; TUO 0.00–R27.52	Jamestown	14.74		CR J5 (Rawhide Road) / Humbug Street	Southern terminus of CR J5
Tuolumne; TUO 0.00–R27.52	Sonora	16.48		SR 108 Bus. begins / SR 108 east – Pinecrest	North end of SR 108 overlap; south end of SR 108 Bus. overlap
Tuolumne; TUO 0.00–R27.52	Sonora	17.97		Washington Street (SR 108 Bus. east) – Sonora Pass, Twain Harte	Former SR 108 east; north end of SR 108 Bus. overlap
Tuolumne; TUO 0.00–R27.52	Columbia	20.41		CR E18 (Parrotts Ferry Road) – Columbia	Southern terminus of CR E18
Tuolumne; TUO 0.00–R27.52	Tuttletown	23.71		CR J5 (Rawhide Road) – Jamestown	Northern terminus of CR J5
New Melones Lake		R27.52 0.00		Archie Stevenot Bridge	
Calaveras; CAL R0.00–30.87	Angels Camp	7.21		Vallecito Road (SR 4 Bus. east) to SR 4 – Murphys, Arnold, Bear Valley, Markleeville	South end of SR 4 Bus. overlap; former SR 4 east
Calaveras; CAL R0.00–30.87	Angels Camp	8.67		SR 4 Bus. ends / SR 4 – Murphys, Stockton	North end of SR 4 Bus. overlap
Calaveras; CAL R0.00–30.87	San Andreas	19.41		Historic SR 49 north (Main Street)	Former SR 49 north
Calaveras; CAL R0.00–30.87	San Andreas	R20.50		SR 12 west – Valley Springs, Stockton	Eastern terminus of SR 12
Calaveras; CAL R0.00–30.87		R22.21		Historic SR 49 south (Gold Strike Road)	Former SR 49 south
Calaveras; CAL R0.00–30.87	Mokelumne Hill	27.61		SR 26 – Valley Springs, West Point	
North Fork Mokelumne River		30.87 0.00		Mokelumne River Bridge	
Amador; AMA 0.00–22.12	Jackson	4.03		SR 88 east – Pine Grove, Lake Tahoe	South end of SR 88 overlap
Amador; AMA 0.00–22.12	Martell	5.93		SR 88 west – Stockton	North end of SR 88 overlap
Amador; AMA 0.00–22.12	Sutter Creek	6.98		SR 104 (Ridge Road)	Eastern terminus of SR 104
Amador; AMA 0.00–22.12	Sutter Creek	R7.30		Old Route 49 north / Valley View Drive – Sutter Creek, Amador City	SR 49 bypass was constructed around Sutter Creek and Amador City in 2009
Amador; AMA 0.00–22.12		R10.76		Old Route 49 south – Amador City, Sutter Creek	SR 49 bypass was constructed around Sutter Creek and Amador City in 2009
Amador; AMA 0.00–22.12	Central House	14.72		SR 16 west – Sacramento	Eastern terminus of SR 16
Amador; AMA 0.00–22.12	Plymouth	17.22		CR E16 (Shenandoah Road) / Main Street – Fiddletown, River Pines	Roundabout; southern terminus of CR E16
Cosumnes River		22.12 0.00		Cosumnes River Bridge	
El Dorado; ED 0.00–38.23	Placerville	14.90		US 50 – Lake Tahoe, Sacramento	
El Dorado; ED 0.00–38.23	Placerville	15.69		SR 193 north – Georgetown	Eastern terminus of SR 193
El Dorado; ED 0.00–38.23	Coloma	22.87		Cold Springs Road (SR 153) – Gold Hill	Eastern terminus of SR 153
El Dorado; ED 0.00–38.23	Cool	34.47		SR 193 east – Greenwood, Georgetown	South end of SR 193 overlap
North Fork American River		38.23 0.00		Tall Green Bridge	
Placer; PLA 0.00–11.37	Auburn	2.36		Historic US 40 east (Lincoln Way) / Borland Avenue	South end of Hist. US 40 overlap
Placer; PLA 0.00–11.37	Auburn	2.52		High Street south (Historic US 40 west) / Elm Avenue east	North end of Hist. US 40 overlap; former SR 49 north
Placer; PLA 0.00–11.37	Auburn	R2.74 17.83 (Note: Indicates that the postmile represents the distance along I-80 rather than SR 49.)		I-80 east / Elm Avenue west – Reno	Interchange; south end of I-80 overlap; I-80 exit 119C
Placer; PLA 0.00–11.37	Auburn	R2.74 17.83		South end of freeway on SR 49	
Placer; PLA 0.00–11.37	Auburn	17.54 3.21		North end of freeway on SR 49	
Placer; PLA 0.00–11.37	Auburn	17.54 3.21		I-80 west (SR 193 west) / Grass Valley Highway to Lincoln Way – Sacramento	Interchange; north end of I-80 / SR 193 overlap; Grass Valley Highway is former SR 49 south; I-80 exit 119B
Placer; PLA 0.00–11.37	North Auburn	6.38		Bell Road to I-80 – Auburn Municipal Airport, Reno, Sacramento	
Bear River		11.37 0.00	Bear River Bridge		
Nevada; NEV 0.00–R32.64	Grass Valley	R13.66	South end of freeway		
Nevada; NEV 0.00–R32.64	Grass Valley	R13.66	—	McKnight Way / South Auburn Street	
Nevada; NEV 0.00–R32.64	Grass Valley	R14.48 R12.30 (Note: Indicates that the postmile represents the distance along SR 20 rather than SR 49.)	—	SR 20 west / Empire Street – Marysville	South end of SR 20 overlap
Nevada; NEV 0.00–R32.64	Grass Valley	R12.92	182A	SR 174 – Colfax, Grass Valley	Exit numbers based on SR 20 mileage; northern terminus of SR 174
Nevada; NEV 0.00–R32.64	Grass Valley	R13.61	182B	Idaho Maryland Road	Northbound signage
Nevada; NEV 0.00–R32.64	Grass Valley	R13.61	182B	East Main Street	Southbound signage
Nevada; NEV 0.00–R32.64	Grass Valley	R14.27	183A	Dorsey Drive	
Nevada; NEV 0.00–R32.64	Grass Valley	R14.80	183B	Brunswick Road	
Nevada; NEV 0.00–R32.64	Nevada City	R15.92	185A	Gold Flat Road / Ridge Road	Signed as exit 185 southbound
Nevada; NEV 0.00–R32.64	Nevada City	R16.74	185B	Sacramento Street – Nevada City	Northbound exit and southbound entrance
Nevada; NEV 0.00–R32.64	Nevada City	R16.99	186	Broad Street	Northbound exit and southbound entrance
Nevada; NEV 0.00–R32.64	Nevada City	R17.24	186	Coyote Street – Historical District	No northbound exit
Nevada; NEV 0.00–R32.64	Nevada City	R17.24	North end of freeway		
Nevada; NEV 0.00–R32.64	Nevada City	R17.40 15.06		SR 20 east / Uren Street – Truckee	North end of SR 20 overlap
Yuba River		R32.64 0.00	Yuba River Bridge		
Yuba; YUB 0.00–9.37		3.59		CR E20 (Marysville Road) – Dobbins	Eastern terminus of CR E20; serves Bullards Bar Reservoir
Sierra; SIE 0.00–64.05		41.19	Yuba Pass, elevation 6,701 feet (2,042 m)		
Sierra; SIE 0.00–64.05		47.44 19.96 (Note: Indicates that the postmile represents the distance along SR 89 rather than SR 49.)		SR 89 north – Calpine, Graeagle, Blairsden, Quincy	West end of SR 89 overlap
Sierra; SIE 0.00–64.05	Sattley	19.05		CR A23 (Westside Road) – Beckwourth, Portola	Southern terminus of CR A23
Sierra; SIE 0.00–64.05	Sierraville	15.06 47.45		SR 89 south (Lincoln Street) – Truckee	East end of SR 89 overlap
Sierra; SIE 0.00–64.05	Loyalton	60.65		CR A24 (Third Street)	Southern terminus of CR A24
Plumas; PLU 0.00–7.50	Vinton	7.50		SR 70 – Beckwourth, Quincy, Reno	Northern terminus; former SR 24 / US 40 Alt.
1.000 mi = 1.609 km; 1.000 km = 0.621 mi: Concurrency terminus; Incomplete access
