= California State Route 193 =

Highway in California

State Route 193

- Map of western Placer and El Dorado Counties, with SR 193 highlighted in red

Route information
- Maintained by Caltrans
- Length: 37 mi (60 km)

Major junctions
- West end: At the eastern city limits of Lincoln between Oak Tree and Stardust Lanes (State Maintenance)
- I-80 from Newcastle to Auburn; SR 49 from Auburn to Cool
- East end: SR 49 in Placerville

Location
- Country: United States
- State: California
- Counties: Placer, El Dorado

Highway system
- State highways in California; Interstate; US; State; Scenic; History; Pre‑1964; Unconstructed; Deleted; Freeways
← SR 192	→ SR 195

State Route 193 (SR 193) is a state highway in the U.S. state of California that runs through Placer and El Dorado counties. It begins as an east–west arterial road running from Lincoln to Newcastle, just west of Auburn. Then after concurrencies with Interstate 80 and State Route 49 through Auburn, SR 193 resumes heading eastward from Cool to Georgetown, then turning south to rejoin SR 49 just north of Placerville.

== Route description ==
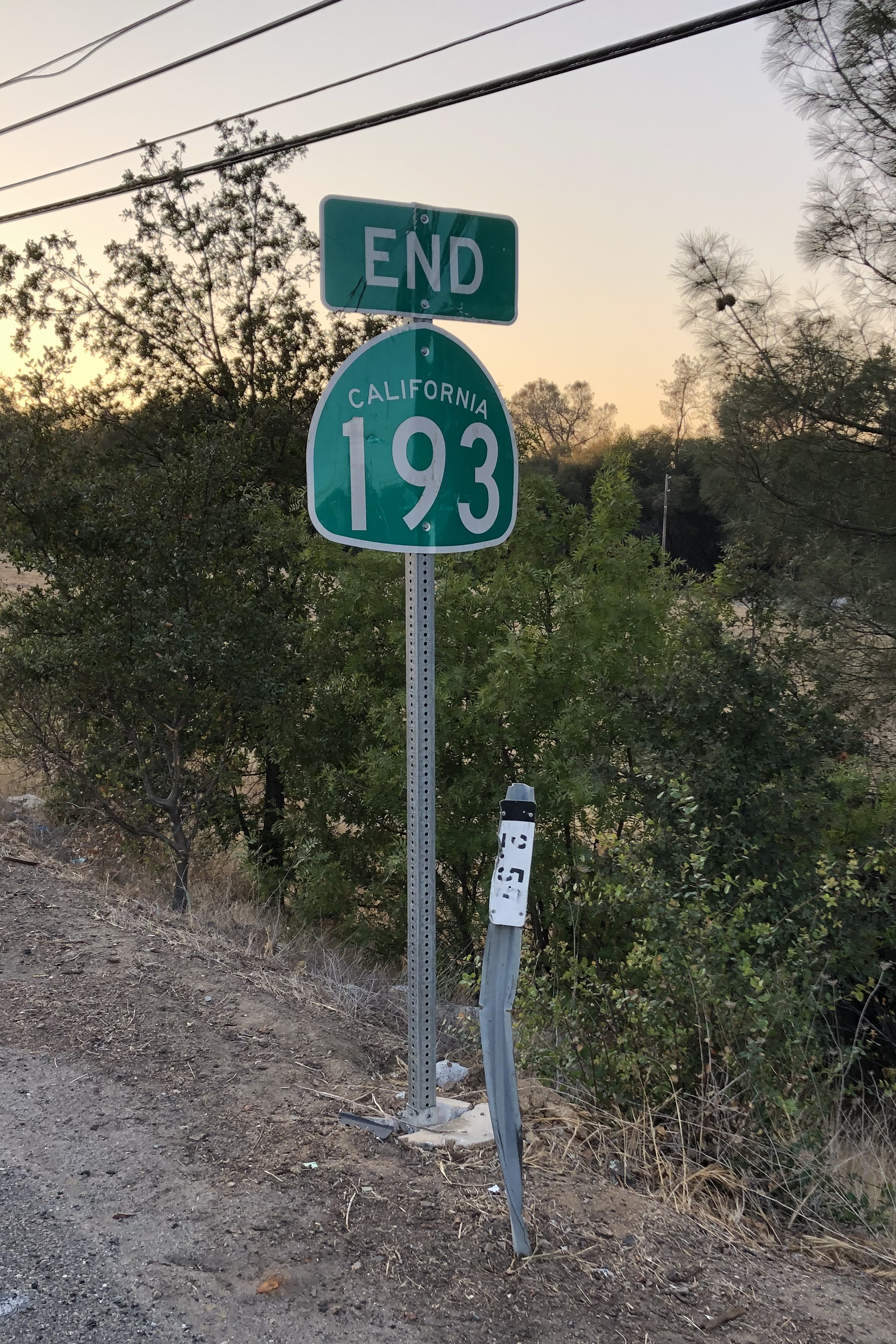
End SR 193 sign at the eastern city limits of Lincoln, 2021

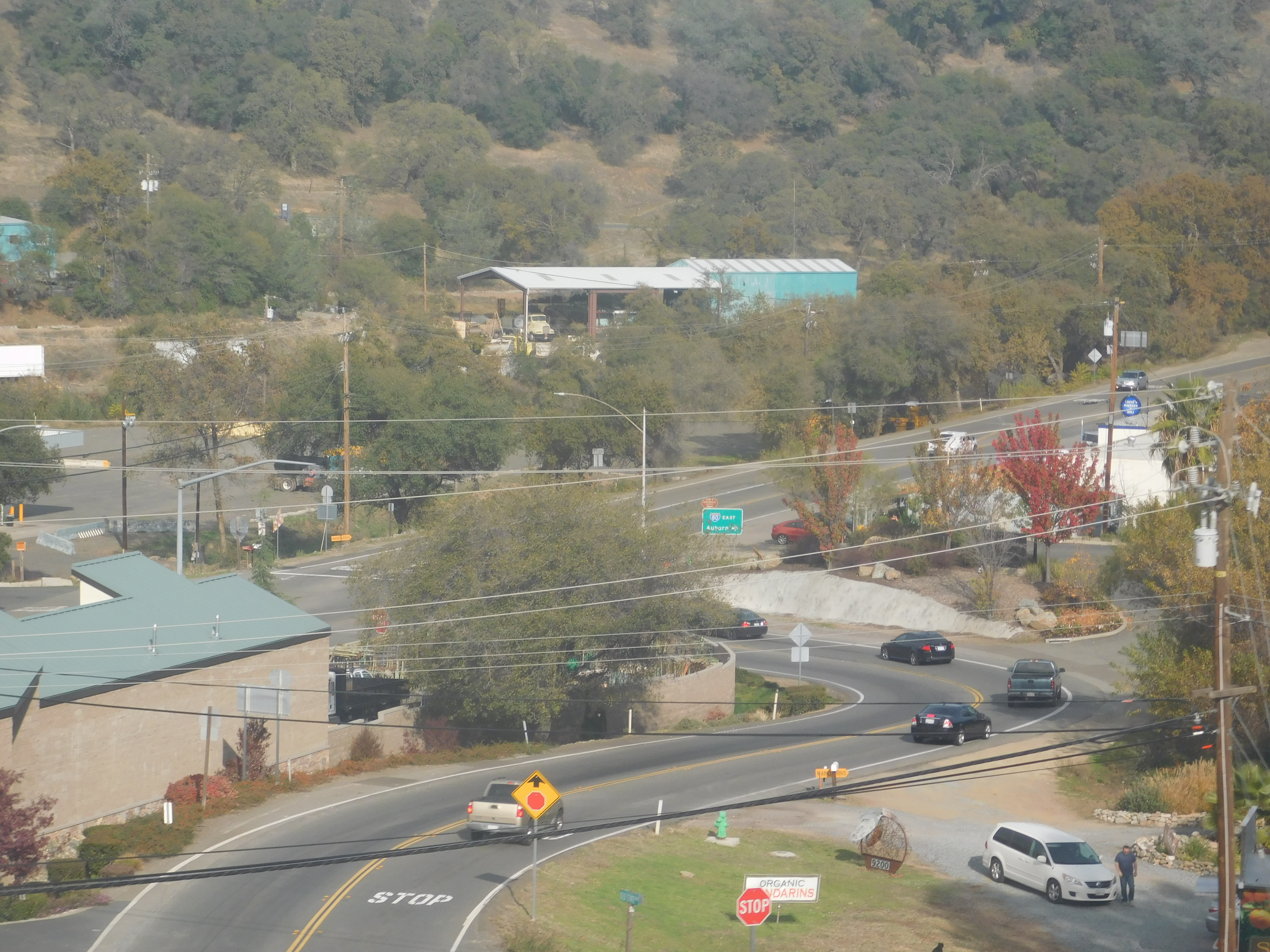
SR 193 approaching Taylor Road in Newcastle, 2015

Route 193 is defined in section 493, subsection (a) of the California Streets and Highways Code:

Route 193 is from:
(1) The City of Lincoln to Route 80 near the City of Newcastle.
(2) Route 49 near the community of Cool to Route 49 near the City of Placerville through the Town of Georgetown.

The definition omits the concurrencies with Route 80 and Route 49 instead of duplicating those segments in the other routes' definitions in the code. Control of the former western end of Route 193 at Route 65 in Lincoln was relinquished by the state to the city, and subdivision (b) mandates that it is no longer eligible to be re-adopted as a state highway. Subdivision (c) also permits the state to relinquish additional segments within Lincoln.

SR 193 begins at the eastern city limits of Lincoln. The route formerly began at a junction with what was then SR 65 (now Lincoln Boulevard) in Lincoln, and was known as McBean Park Drive (SR 65 has since relocated to a new bypass alignment). Control of that portion of SR 193 was relinquished to the City of Lincoln in February 2011. The city has since been annexing more territory to the east to include increasing areas of residential development, and has taken control of more segments of SR 193 from the state.

Heading east from Lincoln, SR 193 runs through rural Placer County as Lincoln Newcastle Highway. It then passes over the tunnel containing Taylor Road before heading east on Taylor Road to an interchange with I-80 in Newcastle.

SR 193 runs concurrently on I-80 eastbound into the city of Auburn, where it then leaves I-80 and runs concurrently with SR 49. These concurrencies are unsigned. SR 193 resumes as Georgetown Road, heading east from SR 49, the town of Cool, and the Auburn State Recreation Area. The highway passes through the towns of Fords Corner, Greenwood, and Georgetown before turning south and encountering the town of Kelsey after several miles. SR 193 terminates at the northern city limits of Placerville at its second junction with SR 49.

SR 193 is part of the California Freeway and Expressway System, but is not part of the National Highway System, a network of highways that are considered essential to the country's economy, defense, and mobility by the Federal Highway Administration.

== Major intersections ==
Except where prefixed with a letter, postmiles were measured on the road as it was in 1964, based on the alignment that existed at the time, and do not necessarily reflect current mileage. Postmile prefixes include: R reflecting a realignment in the route since then, M indicating a second realignment, L referring to an overlap due to a correction or change, and T indicating postmiles classified as temporary. Segments that remain unconstructed or have been relinquished to local control may be omitted. The numbers reset at county lines; the start and end postmiles in each county are given in the county column.

County	Location	Postmile	Exit	Destinations	Notes
Placer; PLA 2.57-38.23 (Note: Indicates that the postmile represents the distance along SR 49 rather than SR 193.)	Lincoln	0.00 (Note: Postmiles are measured from SR 193's original western end at Lincoln Boulevard (former SR 65), before the segment in Lincoln was deleted and relinquished to the city.)		Lincoln Boulevard	Former SR 65; former west end of SR 193
Placer; PLA 2.57-38.23	Lincoln	2.57	West end of state maintenance at Lincoln city limit		
Placer; PLA 2.57-38.23		3.00		Sierra College Boulevard – Penryn, Loomis	
Placer; PLA 2.57-38.23	Newcastle	9.77		Taylor Road	Former US 40 west
Placer; PLA 2.57-38.23	Newcastle	10.20 14.30 (Note: Indicates that the postmile represents the distance along I-80 rather than SR 193.)		I-80 west – Sacramento	Interchange; west end of I-80 overlap; I-80 east exit 116
Placer; PLA 2.57-38.23	Newcastle	10.20 14.30	West end of freeway on I-80		
Placer; PLA 2.57-38.23	Auburn	16.85	118	Ophir Road	Westbound exit and eastbound entrance
Placer; PLA 2.57-38.23	Auburn	17.29	119A	Maple Street, Nevada Street – Auburn	Former US 40 east
Placer; PLA 2.57-38.23	Auburn	17.54	119B	SR 49 north (Grass Valley Highway) – Grass Valley	West end of SR 49 overlap; former SR 49 south; serves Sutter Auburn Faith Hospital
Placer; PLA 2.57-38.23	Auburn	17.83 R2.74	East end of freeway on I-80		
Placer; PLA 2.57-38.23	Auburn	17.83 R2.74		I-80 east / Elm Avenue west – Reno	Interchange; east end of I-80 overlap; I-80 west exit 119C
Placer; PLA 2.57-38.23	Auburn	2.53		High Street, Elm Avenue east (to Harrison Avenue)	Former SR 49 north
El Dorado; ED 0.00-26.95	Cool	34.47 0.00		SR 49 south – Placerville	East end of SR 49 overlap
El Dorado; ED 0.00-26.95	Placerville	26.95		SR 49 (Coloma Street)	East end of SR 193
1.000 mi = 1.609 km; 1.000 km = 0.621 mi: Concurrency terminus; Incomplete access
