= Black Oak Mine Unified School District =

School district in California, United States

Address
- 6540 Wentworth Springs Road Georgetown, California, 95634; United States

District information
- Type: Public
- Grades: K–12
- NCES District ID: 0605240

Students and staff
- Students: 1,284
- Teachers: 60.73 (FTE)
- Staff: 49.45
- Student–teacher ratio: 21.14

Other information
- Website: www.bomusd.org

Black Oak Mine Unified School District (BOMUSD) is a school district headquartered in Georgetown, unincorporated El Dorado County, California.

The district, with 412 square miles (1,070 km^{2}) of land in its territory, serves the Georgetown Divide area of El Dorado County, including Cool, Greenwood, Garden Valley, Georgetown, Kelsey, Volcanoville, and the areas between the middle and south forks of the American River.

The school district was formed from a merger of smaller school districts in 1975.

== Schools ==
All schools are in unincorporated areas.

Primary schools:

- Georgetown School (Georgetown)
- Northside School (Cool)
- American River Charter School K-12(Garden Valley)

Secondary schools:

- Zoned: Golden Sierra High School (Garden Valley)
- Alternative: Divide High School (Garden Valley)

== Previous schools ==
Previous schools include:

- Creekside School
- Otter Creek School (Georgetown)
