= Robinson's Ferry =

Robinson's Ferry may refer to:

- Robinson's Ferry, California in Humboldt County, California
- Robinson's Ferry (boat), a 19th-century ferryboat that is on the California Historical Landmark registry
- Melones, California, now a ghost town, originally Robinson's Ferry, a ferry operated from 1848 on the Stanislaus River, later a gold camp and town, renamed Melones in 1902. Now submerged beneath New Melones Lake. Robinson's Ferry (No. 276 California Historical Landmark).
