= Stevenot =

Stevenot is a surname. Notable people with the surname include:

- Archie Stevenot (1882–1968), American businessman
- Josephus Stevenot (1888–1943), American businessman and military officer
