= Robinsons Ferry, California =

Robinsons Ferry, California may refer to:

- Bridgeville, California
- Melones, California
- Robinson's Ferry, California
