= Yuba Pass (Sierra County) =

Mountain pass in Sierra County, California, United States

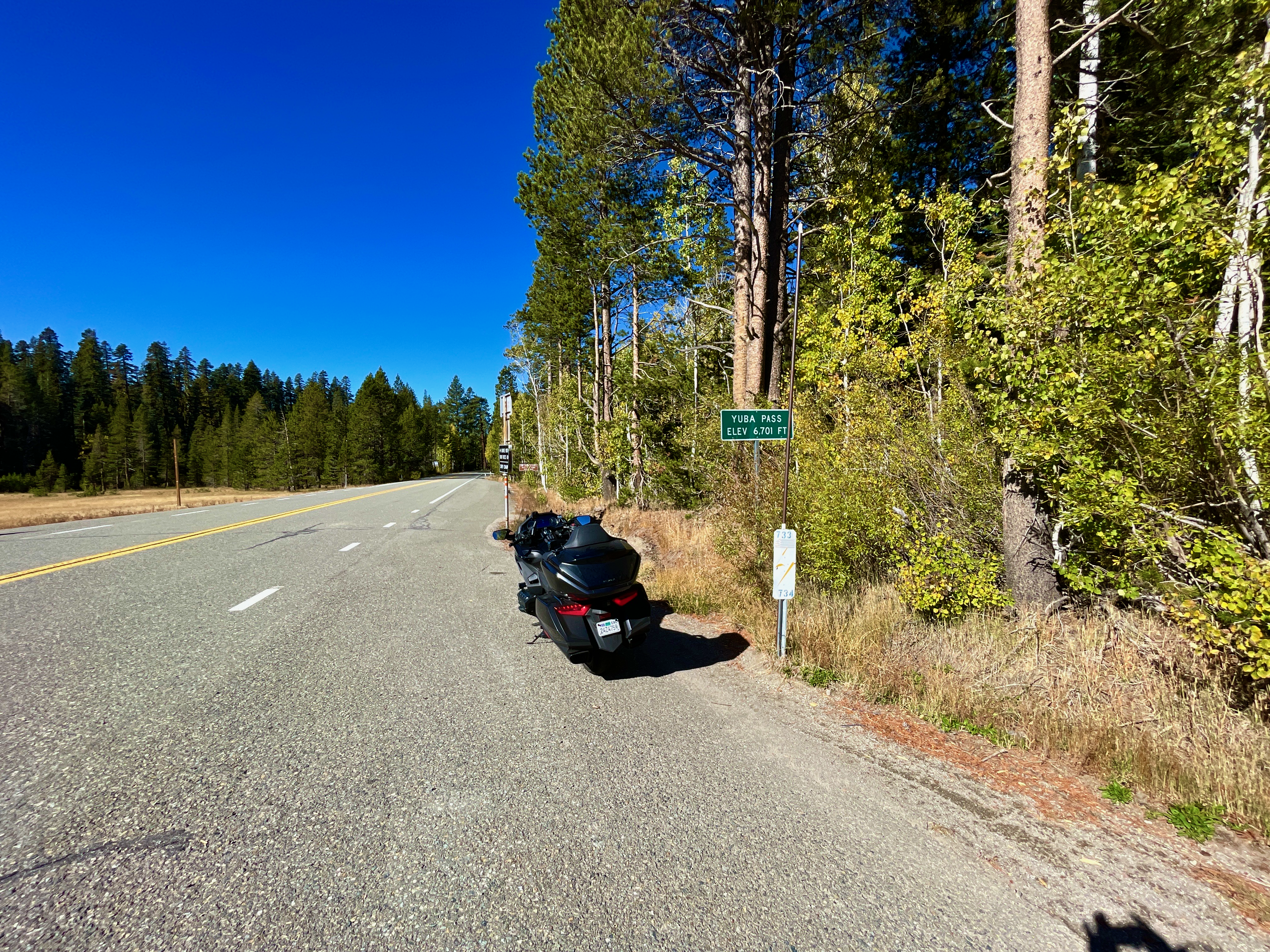
- Yuba Pass Sign on CA State Route 49

- Location within California
- Elevation: 6,710 feet (2,050 m)
- Traversed by: SR 49

Third Approach
- Location: Sierra County, California, U.S.
- Range: Sierra Nevada
- Coordinates: 39°37′03″N 120°29′24″W
- Topo map: USGS Sattley

Yuba Pass is a mountain pass on State Route 49 in Sierra County in the U.S. state of California. The pass lies at an elevation of 6,710 ft (2,050 m) about 3.4 air miles west of Sattley, on the divide between the North Yuba River and the Middle Fork Feather River (Sierra Valley). Thus, unlike most of the well-known Sierra Nevada passes, including the much lower Beckwourth Pass on the east edge of the Sierra Valley, Yuba Pass does not lie on the Great Basin Divide.

This Yuba Pass should not be confused with Yuba Gap, a minor mountain pass along Interstate 80 on the Nevada-Placer county line.

== History ==
=== Winter Recreation Hub ===
Within the Tahoe National Forest, Yuba Pass serves as a year-round hub for outdoor recreation. During winter, the area is renowned for its Yuba Pass Sno-Park, a facility that provides plowed parking and access to a vast network of over 100 miles of groomed trails designated for snowmobiling, cross-country skiing, and even dog sledding.

=== Summer Camping and Wildlife ===
As the snow recedes, the landscape transforms, revealing prime opportunities for different pursuits. The Yuba Pass Campground, typically open from June to October, offers 19 single-family campsites that serve as a base for exploration. The pass area is particularly celebrated among birding enthusiasts. It is recognized as a key birding site where one might spot species such as the Williamson’s Sapsucker, Black-backed Woodpecker, and various nesting warblers and finches, especially during the late spring and summer months.

=== Historic route and travel ===
The route itself, Highway 49, traces the path of the "49ers" and links the historic mining communities of the California Gold Rush. While the pass provides views of the surrounding Sierra, its gentle grades make it a reliable and generally open all-season route for travelers.

== Gallery ==
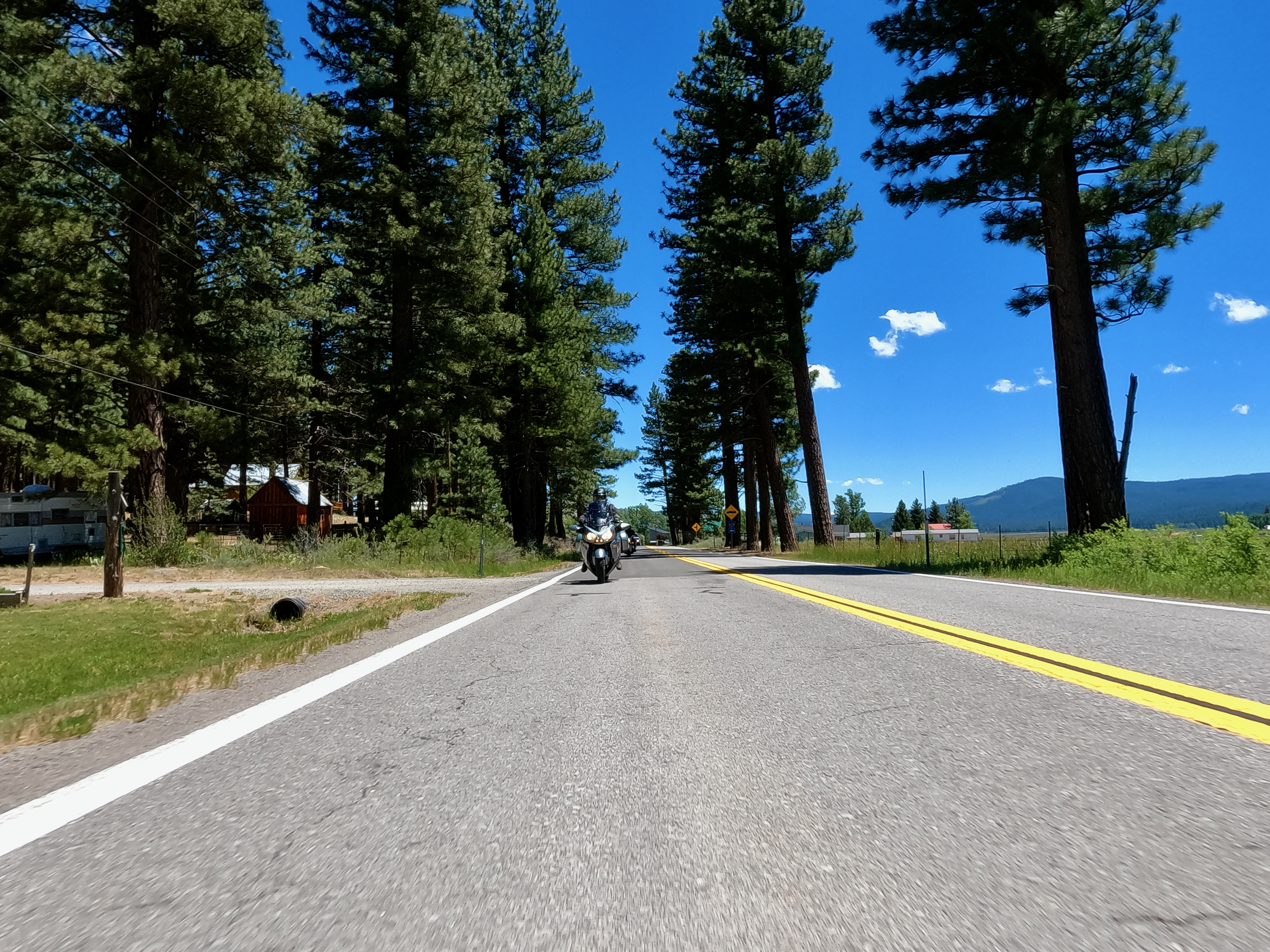
SR49 east of Yuba Pass

== See also ==
- List of mountain passes in California
