= Bassetts, California =

Unincorporated community in California, United States

- Unincorporated community
- Location within California Location within the United States
- Coordinates: 39.61714°N 120.59179°W
- Country: United States
- State: California
- County: Sierra
- Elevation: 5,538 ft (1,688 m)
- Time zone: UTC-8 (Pacific (PST))
  - Summer (DST): UTC-7 (PDT)
- Area code: 530
- GNIS feature ID: 1658002

Bassetts is an unincorporated community in Sierra County, California, United States. Bassetts is located along California State Highway 49 and the North Yuba River. The community was previously known as Hancock House and Howard Ranch; it was given its current name in the 1870s after Jacob and Mary Bassett.
