= California State Route 153 =

Highway in California

State Route 153
- SR 153 highlighted in red

Route information
- Maintained by Caltrans
- Length: 0.550 mi (885 m)

Major junctions
- From: SR 49 in Coloma
- To: James Marshall Monument in Marshall Gold Discovery State Historic Park

Location
- Country: United States
- State: California
- Counties: El Dorado

Highway system
- State highways in California; Interstate; US; State; Scenic; History; Pre‑1964; Unconstructed; Deleted; Freeways
← SR 152	→ SR 154

State Route 153 (SR 153) is a very short state highway in the U.S. state of California in El Dorado County. It extends only 0.5 miles (0.80 km) from the junction of Cold Springs Road and SR 49, in the town of Coloma in the heart of California's Gold Country, to the monument marking the grave of James Marshall, whose finding of gold along the American River, January 24, 1848 sparked the California Gold Rush. The exact routing is from SR 49 south on Cold Springs Road then west on Monument Road in Marshall Gold Discovery State Historic Park to the monument.

Although the California Department of Transportation has posted a sign indicating that SR 153 is "California's shortest state highway", it is not: SR 77, SR 265, SR 283, and SR 275 are all shorter. However, these highways are merely short connectors between other highways.

== Route description ==
Route 153 is defined in section 453 of the California Streets and Highways Code, and that the highway is "from Route 49 near Coloma to Marshall's Monument".

SR 153 connects SR 49 in Coloma with the monument to James Marshall in Marshall Gold Discovery State Historic Park, via south on Cold Springs Road then west on Monument Road. SR 153 is neither signed at the SR 49/Cold Springs Road intersection nor at the Cold Springs/Monument Road junction. The only SR 153 marker is on Monument Road with another sign below it claiming that the route is "California's shortest state highway".

The Monument Road portion of the highway is quite narrow, and appears to end at a park employee residence. There is an easily overlooked sign which indicates that the road continues across, as a very narrow one way road, in front of the yard of the residence. There is a parking lot on the right just before the park employee residence, but there is also a smaller parking area closer to the monument on the loop road that circles it. The highway officially terminates at the monument, but since the last short segment is one way, one cannot legally retrace one's route if they drive all the way to the monument. The one lane, one way road continues on past its junction with the loop road, down the hill and passes Marshall's cabin, ending at the junction of Church and High streets. One can then use Church Street to get back to SR 49 and SR 153. According to the park, the narrow one way portion of the road is unsuitable for buses and large vehicles.

SR 153 is not part of the National Highway System, a network of highways that are considered essential to the country's economy, defense, and mobility by the Federal Highway Administration.

== Major intersections ==
Except where prefixed with a letter, postmiles were measured on the road as it was in 1964, based on a measurement starting at its eastern terminus rather than normally starting at the western end, and do not necessarily reflect current mileage. Postmile prefixes include: R reflecting a realignment in the route since then, M indicating a second realignment, L referring to an overlap due to a correction or change, and T indicating postmiles classified as temporary. Segments that remain unconstructed or have been relinquished to local control may be omitted. The entire route is in El Dorado County.

Location	Postmile	Destinations	Notes
Coloma	0.00	SR 49 (Coloma Road) – Auburn, Placerville	East end of SR 153
Marshall Gold Discovery State Historic Park	0.55	James Marshall Monument	West end of SR 153
1.000 mi = 1.609 km; 1.000 km = 0.621 mi
