= Garden Valley, California =

Unincorporated community in California, United States

Garden Valley
- Unincorporated community
- Location in California Garden Valley (the United States)
- Coordinates: 38°51′15″N 120°51′34″W
- Country: United States
- State: California
- County: El Dorado County
- Elevation: 1,949 ft (594 m)

Garden Valley (formerly Johntown) is an unincorporated community in El Dorado County, California. It is located on Johntown Creek 6.25 miles (10 km) north-northwest of Chili Bar, at an elevation of 1949 feet (594 m).

A post office operated at Garden Valley from 1852 to 1853, from 1854 to 1862, from 1872 to 1895, and from 1896 to present (having moved in 1940). The place was originally called Johntown in honor of the sailor who discovered gold at the site.

The first Garden Valley community hall was built in 1856 by the Sons of Temperance; it was replaced by a second hall in the 1870s and a third in 1933. James Marshall, whose 1848 discovery of gold at Sutter's Mill launched the California Gold Rush, was a regular visitor to Garden Valley.

Garden Valley, like many communities in the foothills of El Dorado County, lies in a region with significant levels of asbestos in the soil. Roads in Garden Valley were paved in 1986 in an effort to control asbestos-laden dust; the state issued an air quality warning for the area in 1999, but county supervisors voted down a measure to protect the residents from asbestos dust.

== Education ==
The Black Oak Mine Unified School District serves Garden Valley.
