= New Bullards Bar Dam =

Dam in California

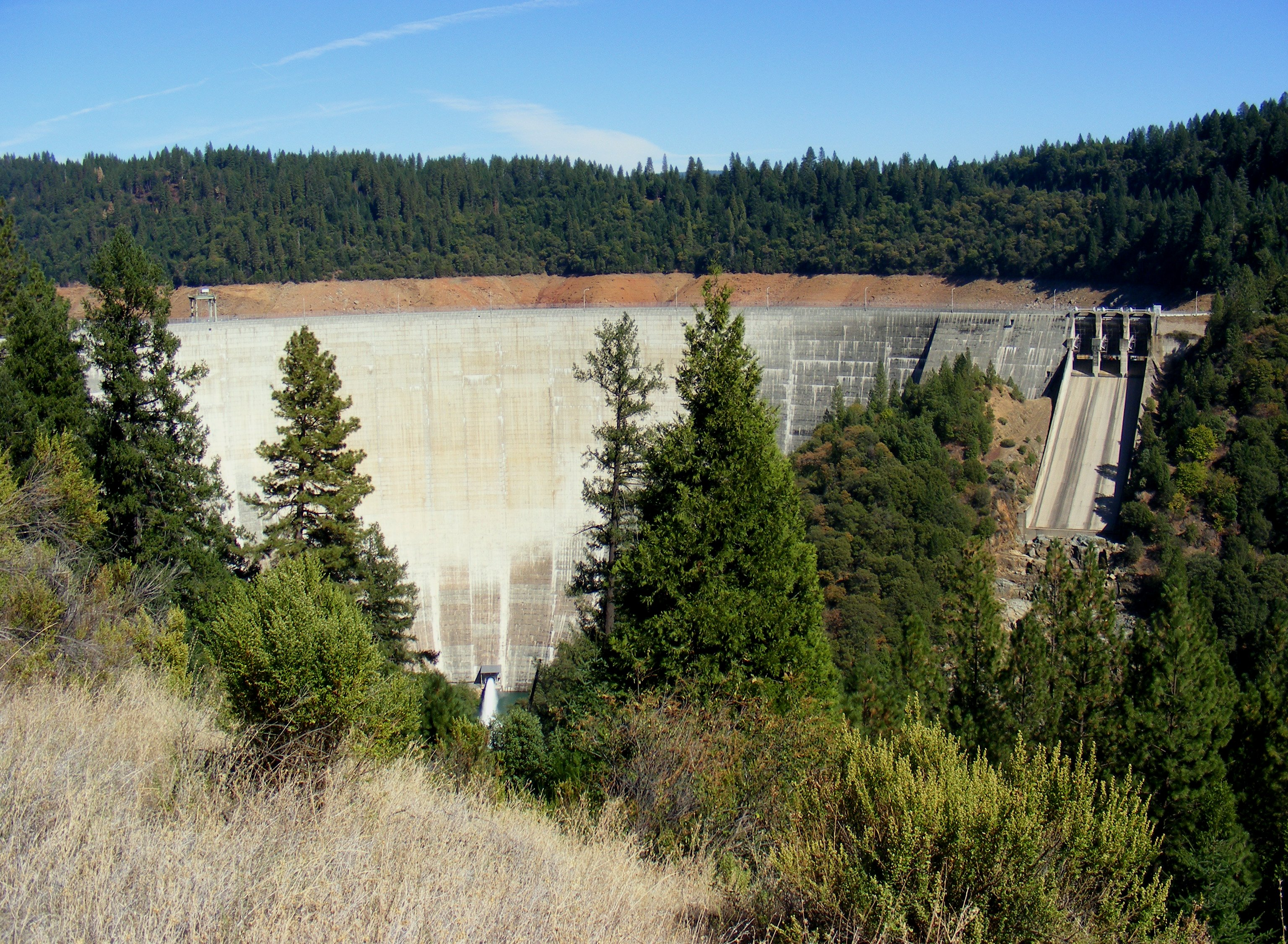
- Interactive map of New Bullards Bar Dam
- Official name: New Bullards Bar Dam
- Location: Yuba County, California
- Coordinates: 39°23′36″N 121°08′35″W
- Opening date: 1969; 57 years ago
- Operator: Yuba County Water Agency

Dam and spillways
- Impounds: North Yuba River
- Height: 645 ft (197 m)
- Length: 2,587 ft (789 m)
- Spillway type: Concrete chute, 3x Tainter gates
- Spillway capacity: 160,000 cu ft/s (4,500 m^{3}/s)

Reservoir
- Creates: New Bullards Bar Reservoir
- Total capacity: 969,600 acre⋅ft (1.1960×10^{9} m^{3})
- Catchment area: 489 mi^{2} (1,270 km^{2})
- Surface area: 4,810 acres (1,950 ha)

Power Station
- Hydraulic head: 1,306 ft (398 m)
- Turbines: 2x Pelton
- Installed capacity: 340 MW
- Annual generation: 1,114 GWh (2001–2012)

New Bullards Bar Dam is a variable-radius concrete arch dam constructed in the early 1960s in California on the North Yuba River. Located near the town of Dobbins in Yuba County, the dam forms the New Bullards Bar Reservoir, which can hold about 969,600 acre⋅ft (1.1960×10^{9} m^{3}) of water. The dam serves for irrigation, drinking water, and hydroelectric power generation.

== History ==
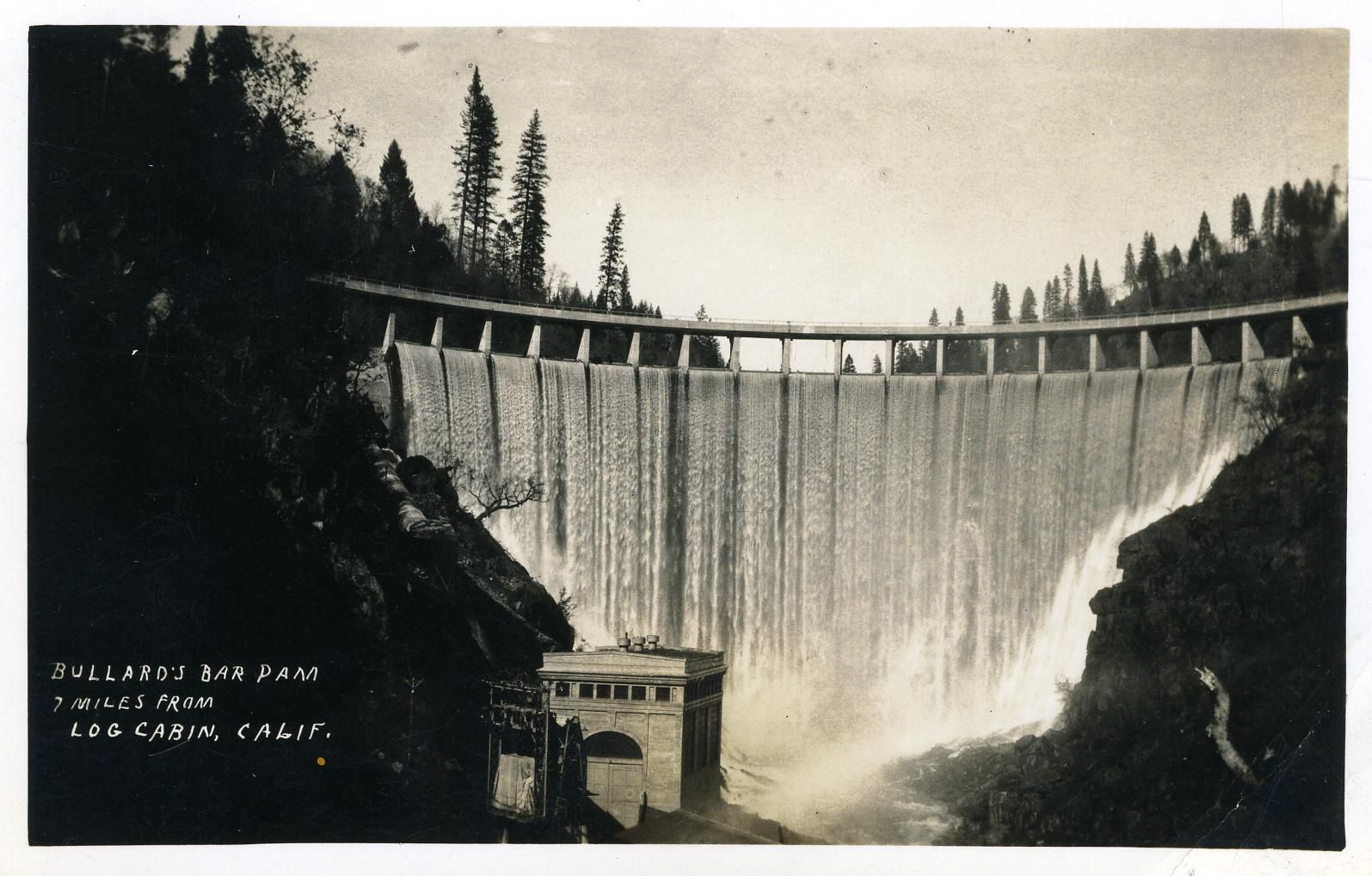
The 1922 PG&E dam at Bullards Bar

New Bullards Bar Dam was constructed by the Yuba County Water Agency. The agency was created through an act of the state legislature in 1959 specifically to construct a flood-control reservoir in response to a flooding event in 1955. The bulk of the financing for the dam came from the issuance of revenue bonds. The dam was completed in 1969.

The dam is the fourth constructed on the Bullards Bar site, succeeding diversion dams built in 1899 and 1900 as well as a 200-foot (61 m) concrete arch dam built by the Yuba River Power Company and transferred to Pacific Gas and Electric Company in 1922. The dam generated power from 1924 until its inundation by the New Bullards Bar Reservoir in 1969. Although the 1899 diversion dam was washed away, the 1900 dam is still in place underwater about one-quarter mile (0.4 km) upstream from the present dam.

== Operations ==
New Bullards Bar Reservoir provides flood-control space between September 15 and May 31 of each year. There are 170,000 acre-feet (210,000,000 m^{3}) of flood-control storage space between October 31 and March 31.

The reservoir controls water flows from the North Yuba River, as well as from the Middle Yuba River and Oregon Creek via diversion tunnels. The Our House Diversion Dam is situated on the Middle Yuba about 8 miles (13 km) above its mouth and diverts water into a 5.5-mile (8.9 km) tunnel with a capacity of 810 cubic feet per second (23 m^{3}/s), running northwest to the Log Cabin Diversion Dam on Oregon Creek. From here the combined waters of the Middle Yuba and Oregon Creek are sent west into a shorter 1.3-mile (2.1 km) tunnel with a capacity of 1,100 cubic feet per second (31 m^{3}/s) into the eastern (Willow Creek) arm of New Bullards Bar Reservoir. The diversions add about 173.9 square miles (450 km^{2}) to the effective catchment area of New Bullards Bar Reservoir. The entire diversion and reservoir system is collectively known as the Yuba River Development Project.

Flood operations in the New Bullards Bar Reservoir water-control manual are in part defined with being linked to operations in Marysville Dam. Marysville Dam was supposed to be built as part of a system of dams in the Sacramento Basin along with New Bullards Bar and Oroville Dam, but it was never built. Marysville Dam is still a defining function in the downstream channel capacity constraints, even though it is non-existent.

The dam furnishes water via a penstock through a mountain to the New Colgate Powerhouse, which is located 5.2 miles (8.4 km) downstream. The added distance increases the hydraulic head. Its two Pelton wheels have a combined capacity of 340 megawatts and are the largest of their kind in the world. At maximum generation, the powerhouse uses a flow of 3,430 cubic feet per second (97 m^{3}/s), and is an important source of peaking power for the region. The small Fish Release powerhouse was constructed in 1986 at the base of the dam. It has a capacity of 150 kilowatts and generates power from water releases for fish on the Yuba River. Total annual generation at New Colgate Powerhouse is about 1,314,000 megawatt hours (MWh), while the Fish Release powerhouse produces 1,300 MWh.

The aforementioned 14-foot-diameter (4.3 m) penstock drains water from the New Bullards Bar Reservoir several miles through a mountain and down a large hill to deliver water to the New Colgate Powerhouse. In 2006, a 168-inch (4,300 mm) butterfly valve was designed and manufactured in Europe for installation in the penstock at the top of the hill to protect the powerhouse from flooding in the event that an earthquake or other event caused the penstock to rupture. This valve uses a design similar to that of the dam's base release works.

On February 13, 2026, the New Colgate Powerhouse penstock ruptured. The steel pipe, which runs a half mile between Bullards Bar Reservoir and the powerhouse, failed during testing, releasing an estimated 400 acre-feet of water down the canyon hillside. Downstream, river flows on the lower Yuba fell from 1,400 cubic feet per second to 560 cubic feet per second within about two hours as the second powerhouse on the river was also forced offline. Repair cost projections are ranging as high as one billion dollars, and the powerhouse was expected to remain offline for potentially several years. This loss reduced the regional grid's ability to meet peak electricity demand. Agricultural irrigators in Yuba County also face reduced water delivery flexibility during the repair period.

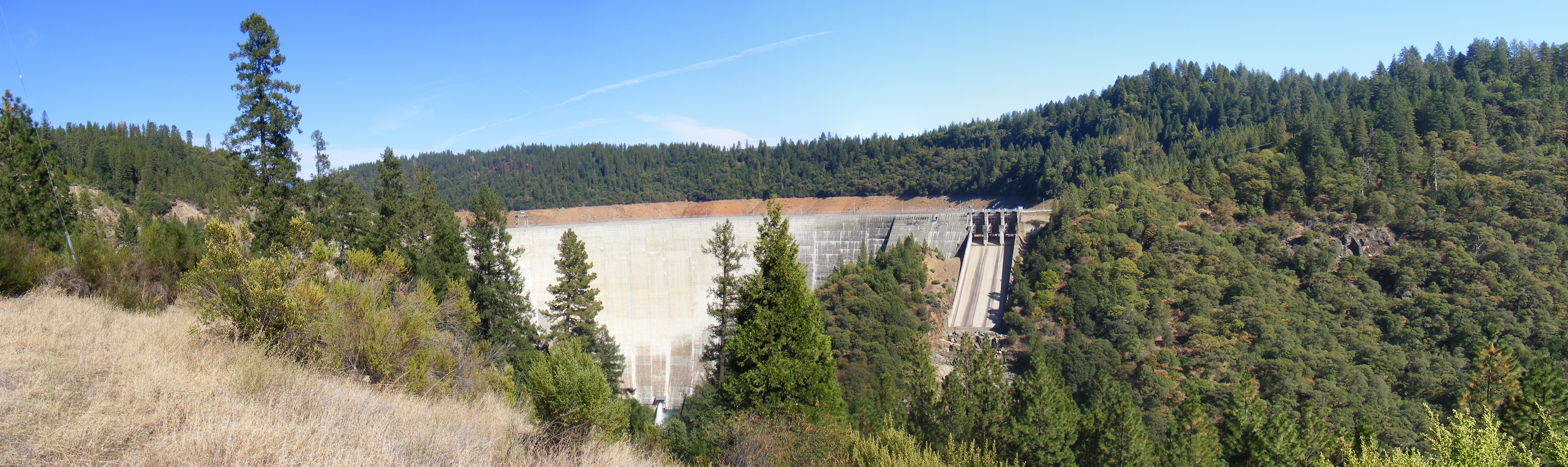
A view of Bullards Bar dam and reservoir from Marysville Rd

== See also ==
- Oroville Dam
- List of dams and reservoirs in California
- List of lakes in California
- List of largest reservoirs of California
- List of power stations in California
