= Way Too Cool 50 Kilometer =

Cool Ultramarathon

The Way Too Cool 50K Endurance Run is an annual ultramarathon run in the Sierra Nevada, that starts and ends in the town of Cool.

The race takes place in early March, and was first held in 1990.

== Course ==
Most of the course is held on single-track trails and fire roads. The race course follows sections of the Western States Trail Ride route, in the Sierra Nevada within El Dorado County and Placer County.

The course has greater than 4,800 feet (1,500 m) of vertical elevation change along its 31 miles (50 km) length.

== Participation ==
Registration opens in the beginning of December and runners are selected by lottery.

The race has a high completion rate greater than 95%.
