= North Yuba River =

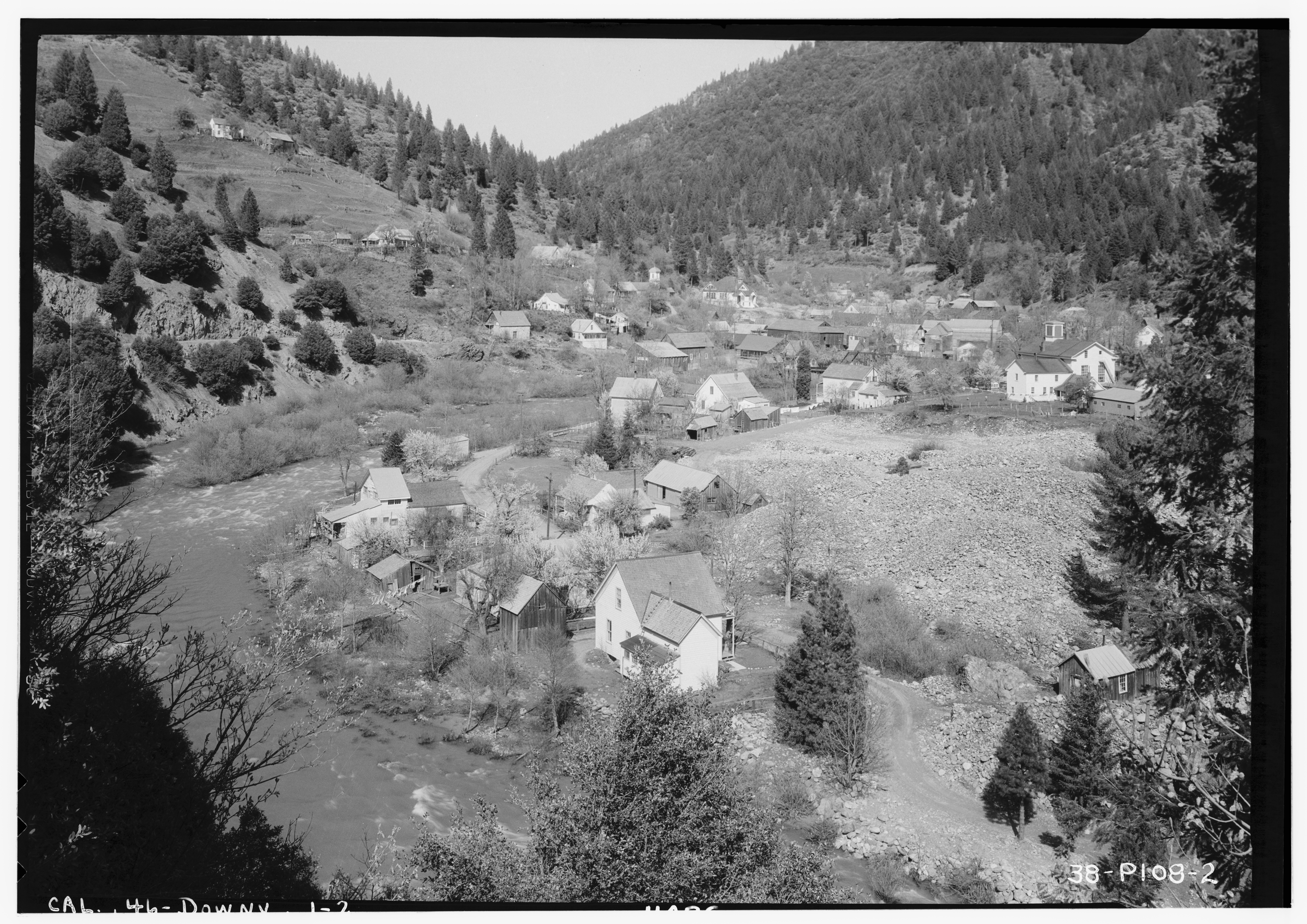
- The North Yuba at Downieville, c. 1934

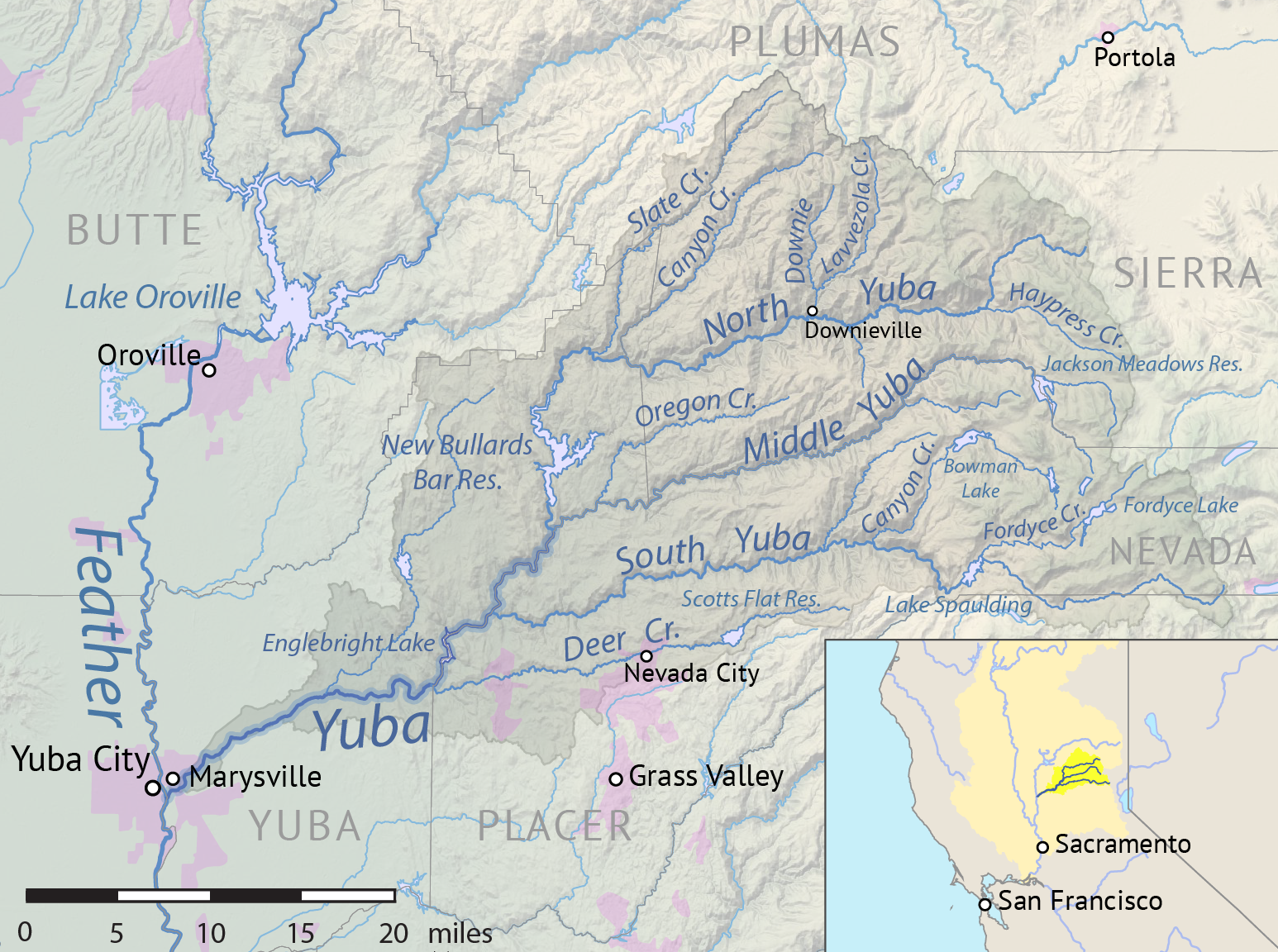
- Map of the Yuba River watershed, including the North Yuba River

Location
- Country: United States
- State: California

Physical characteristics
- Source: Yuba Pass
  - location: Near State Route 49, Sierra Nevada
  - coordinates: 39°37′03″N 120°29′53″W
  - elevation: 7,018 ft (2,139 m)
- Mouth: Yuba River
  - location: West of North San Juan, Yuba County
  - coordinates: 39°22′07″N 121°08′11″W
  - elevation: 1,129 ft (344 m)
- Length: 61 mi (98 km)
- Basin size: 489 sq mi (1,270 km^{2})
- Discharge
  - location: above New Bullards Bar Reservoir
  - average: 1,248 cu ft/s (35.3 m^{3}/s)
  - minimum: 78 cu ft/s (2.2 m^{3}/s)
  - maximum: 63,400 cu ft/s (1,800 m^{3}/s)

The North Yuba River (also called the North Fork Yuba River) is the main tributary of the Yuba River in northern California in the United States. The river is about 61 miles (98 km) long and drains from the Sierra Nevada westwards towards the foothills between the mountains and the Sacramento Valley.

It rises on the Sierra Crest about 8 miles (13 km) northwest of Sierraville. The river flows west through meadows, then south into a gorge, turning west again, followed by California State Route 49. The river's four major tributaries, the Downie River, Goodyears Creek, Canyon Creek and Slate Creek, enter from the right before the river abruptly turns south at the New Bullards Bar Reservoir, formed by the New Bullards Bar Dam. The dam is situated right above the river's mouth; just after the North Yuba leaves the dam it empties into the Middle Yuba River and forms the Yuba River.
