= Archie Stevenot Bridge =

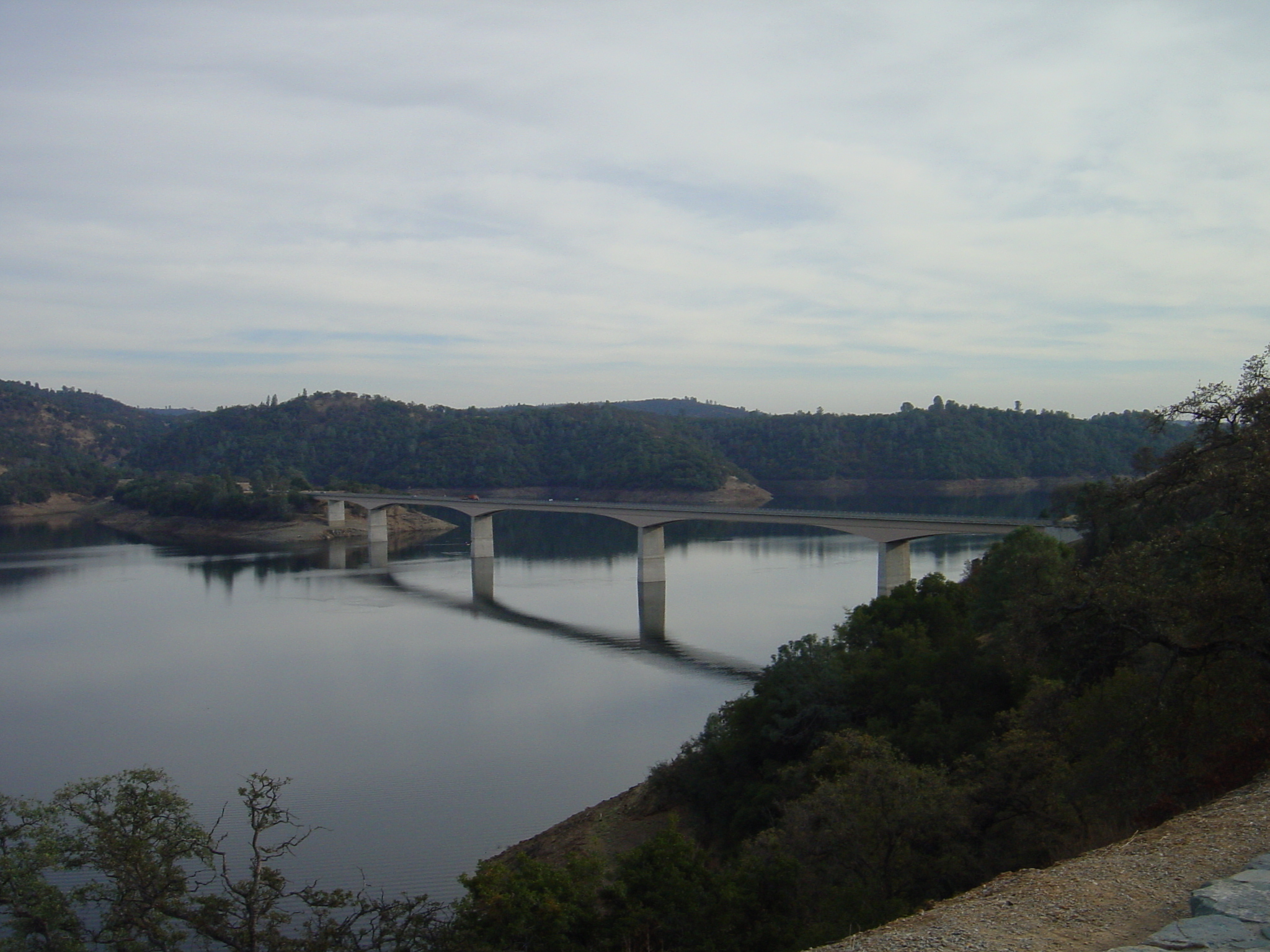
- The Archie Stevenot Bridge won an AISC Prize Bridge award in 1978 for long span bridges.
- Coordinates: 38.004034°N 120.499978°W
- Carries: SR 49
- Crosses: New Melones Lake
- Locale: California
- Named for: Archie Stevenot

History
- Opened: 1979

The Stevenot Bridge carries State Route 49 over New Melones Lake on the Stanislaus River between Calaveras and Tuolumne Counties in the U.S. state of California and was completed in 1976. It is named after Archie Stevenot, who helped found the California Chamber of Commerce.
