= Archie Stevenot =

American businessman (1882–1968)

Birthplace of Archie Stevenot (Mr. Mother Lode)
- Location within California Location within the United States
- 38.027650°N 120.506667°W
- Location: State Hwy 4 Amador County, Angels Camp, California

California Historical Landmark
- Reference no.: 769

Archie Stevenot (September 25, 1882 – August 1, 1968) was a prominent citizen in Calaveras County, California and Supreme Noble Grand Humbug of E Clampus Vitus. Born in Carson Hill, Stevenot helped found the California Chamber of Commerce and his family established the borax industry in the state. He also established the Mother Lode Highway Association in 1919 which was primarily responsible for the creation of State Route 49. As a result, the bridge across the Stanislaus River between Tuolumne and Calaveras counties on SR 49 is named the Archie Stevenot Bridge in his honor, and his birthplace has been declared California Historical Landmark No. 769 (also found on SR 49).

== See also ==
- California Historical Landmarks in Calaveras County
