= Lotus, California =

Unincorporated community in California, United States

Lotus
- Unincorporated community
- Location in California Lotus (the United States)
- Coordinates: 38°48′06″N 120°54′31″W
- Country: United States
- State: California
- County: El Dorado
- Elevation: 720 ft (220 m)
- ZIP code: 95651
- Area code: 530

Lotus (formerly Marshall and Uniontown) is an unincorporated community in El Dorado County, California, United States. It is located 1 mile (1.6 km) west of Coloma, at an elevation of 722 feet (220 m).

The settlement was established in 1849 and named for James W. Marshall, a discoverer of gold. In 1850, the name was changed to Uniontown to commemorate California's admission to the Union. The name was changed to Lotus with the arrival of the post office in 1881. Lotus once had a store, dance hall, and a large Chinese population, including a Chinese cemetery. At its peak, the town was estimated to have 8,000 to 10,000 residents; now it is overshadowed by its neighbor Coloma.
