= Sattley, California =

Sattley
- census-designated place

- Location within California Location within the United States
- Coordinates: 39°36′58″N 120°25′38″W
- Country: United States
- State: California
- County: Sierra

Area
  - Total: 2.049 sq mi (5.307 km^{2})
  - Land: 2.047 sq mi (5.303 km^{2})
  - Water: 0.0019 sq mi (0.005 km^{2}) 0.09%
- Elevation: 4,947 ft (1,508 m)

Population (2020)
  - Total: 44
  - Density: 21/sq mi (8.3/km^{2})
- Time zone: UTC-8 (Pacific (PST))
  - Summer (DST): UTC-7 (PDT)
- Area code: 530
- GNIS feature IDs: 232594; 2583131

Sattley, formerly known as Church's Corners, is a census-designated place in Sierra County, California, United States. Sattley is located on state routes 49 and 89, southwest of Loyalton. According to the Sattley-Sierraville community association, it was named after resident Harriet Sattley Church. The community board also states that the town was founded in 1881 by Eric Amen, a wealthy prospector. The post office in Sattley opened in 1884.

As of the 2020 census, Sattley had a population of 44.

== Geography ==
According to the United States Census Bureau, the CDP covers an area of 2.0 square miles (5.3 km^{2}), 99.91% of it land and 0.09% of it water.

== Demographics ==
Historical population
Census	Pop.	Note	%±
2010	49		—
2020	44		−10.2%
U.S. Decennial Census; 2010

Sattley first appeared as a census designated place in the 2010 U.S. census.

Sattley CDP, California – Racial and ethnic composition Note: the US Census treats Hispanic/Latino as an ethnic category. This table excludes Latinos from the racial categories and assigns them to a separate category. Hispanics/Latinos may be of any race.
Race / Ethnicity (NH = Non-Hispanic)	Pop 2010	Pop 2020	% 2010	% 2020
White alone (NH)	48	39	97.96%	88.64%
Black or African American alone (NH)	0	0	0.00%	0.00%
Native American or Alaska Native alone (NH)	0	0	0.00%	0.00%
Asian alone (NH)	0	0	0.00%	0.00%
Native Hawaiian or Pacific Islander alone (NH)	0	0	0.00%	0.00%
Other race alone (NH)	0	0	0.00%	0.00%
Mixed race or Multiracial (NH)	0	3	0.00%	6.82%
Hispanic or Latino (any race)	1	2	2.04%	4.55%
Total	49	44	100.00%	100.00%

=== 2020 census ===
The 2020 United States census reported that Sattley had a population of 44. The population density was 21.5 inhabitants per square mile (8.3/km^{2}). The racial makeup of Sattley was 39 (89%) White, and 5 (11%) from two or more races. Hispanic or Latino of any race were 2 persons (5%).

There were 27 households, and the average household size was 1.63.

The age distribution was 8 people (18%) under the age of 18, 7 people (16%) aged 18 to 24, 8 people (18%) aged 25 to 44, 13 people (30%) aged 45 to 64, and 8 people (18%) who were 65 years of age or older. The median age was 39.0 years. There were 18 males and 26 females.

There were 30 housing units at an average density of 14.7 units per square mile (5.7 units/km^{2}), of which 27 (90%) were occupied. Of these, 13 (48%) were owner-occupied, and 14 (52%) were occupied by renters.

== Politics ==
In the state legislature, Sattley is in the 1st senatorial district, represented by Republican Megan Dahle, and the 1st Assembly district, represented by Republican Heather Hadwick.

Federally, Sattley is in California's 3rd congressional district, represented by Independent Kevin Kiley.
