= New Melones Lake =

Reservoir in California, USA

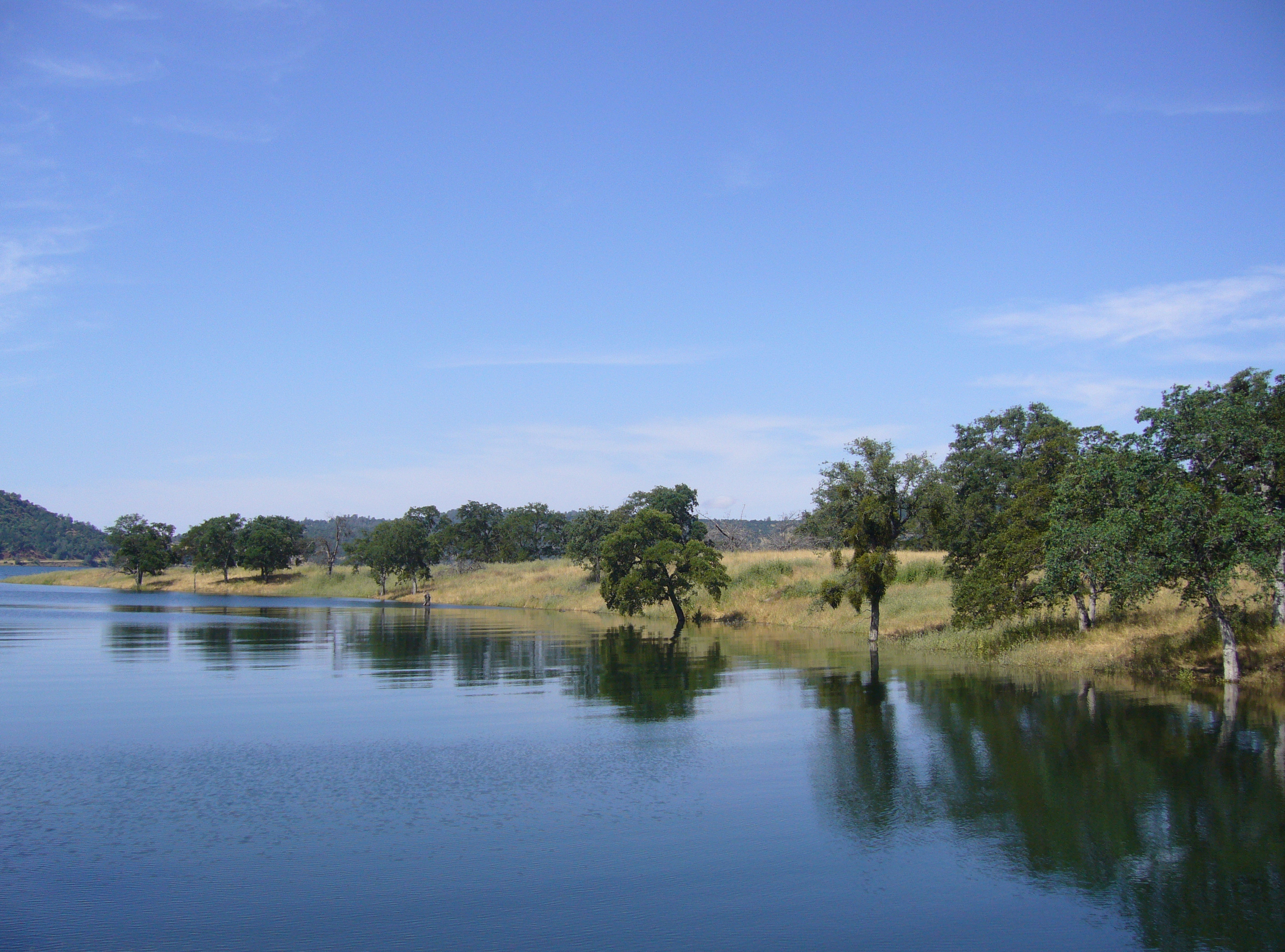

- Location within California Location within the United States
- Location: Calaveras County, California; Tuolumne County, California
- Coordinates: 37.9990°N 120.5212°W
- Lake type: Reservoir
- Primary inflows: Stanislaus River
- Primary outflows: Stanislaus River; Terminal (evaporation)
- Catchment area: 2,300 km^{2} (890 sq mi)
- Basin countries: United States
- Max. length: 12 km (7.5 mi)
- Max. width: 4 km (2.5 mi)
- Surface area: 5,100 ha (13,000 acres)
- Water volume: 2,400,000 acre⋅ft (3,000,000 dam^{3})
- Shore length^{1}: 160 km (99 mi)
- Surface elevation: 331 m (1,086 ft)
- References: U.S. Geological Survey Geographic Names Information System: New Melones Lake
- ^{1} Shore length is not a well-defined measure.

New Melones Lake is a reservoir on the Stanislaus River in the central Sierra Nevada foothills, within Calaveras County and Tuolumne County, California.

The New Melones Dam and reservoir are a water collection and transfer unit of the United States Bureau of Reclamation's Central Valley Project. New Melones Lake provides irrigation water, hydroelectric power, flood control, and wildlife habitat. Recreation uses include fishing, camping, and boating within the Glory Hole Recreation Area and Tuttletown Recreation Area.

The California Office of Environmental Health Hazard Assessment (OEHHA) has developed a safe eating advisory for fish caught in New Melones Lake based on levels of mercury or PCBs found in the fish species.

== Geography ==
The reservoir is impounded by the New Melones Dam, and has a 2,400,000 acre⋅ft (3.0 km^{3}) capacity with a surface area of 12,500 acres (5,100 ha). When full, the shoreline is more than 100 miles (160 km) long.

The reservoir and dam are located west of Jamestown and Sonora, and south of Angels Camp. The Archie Stevenot Bridge, completed in 1976, carries Hwy 49 across the lake and border between Calaveras and Tuolumne Counties.

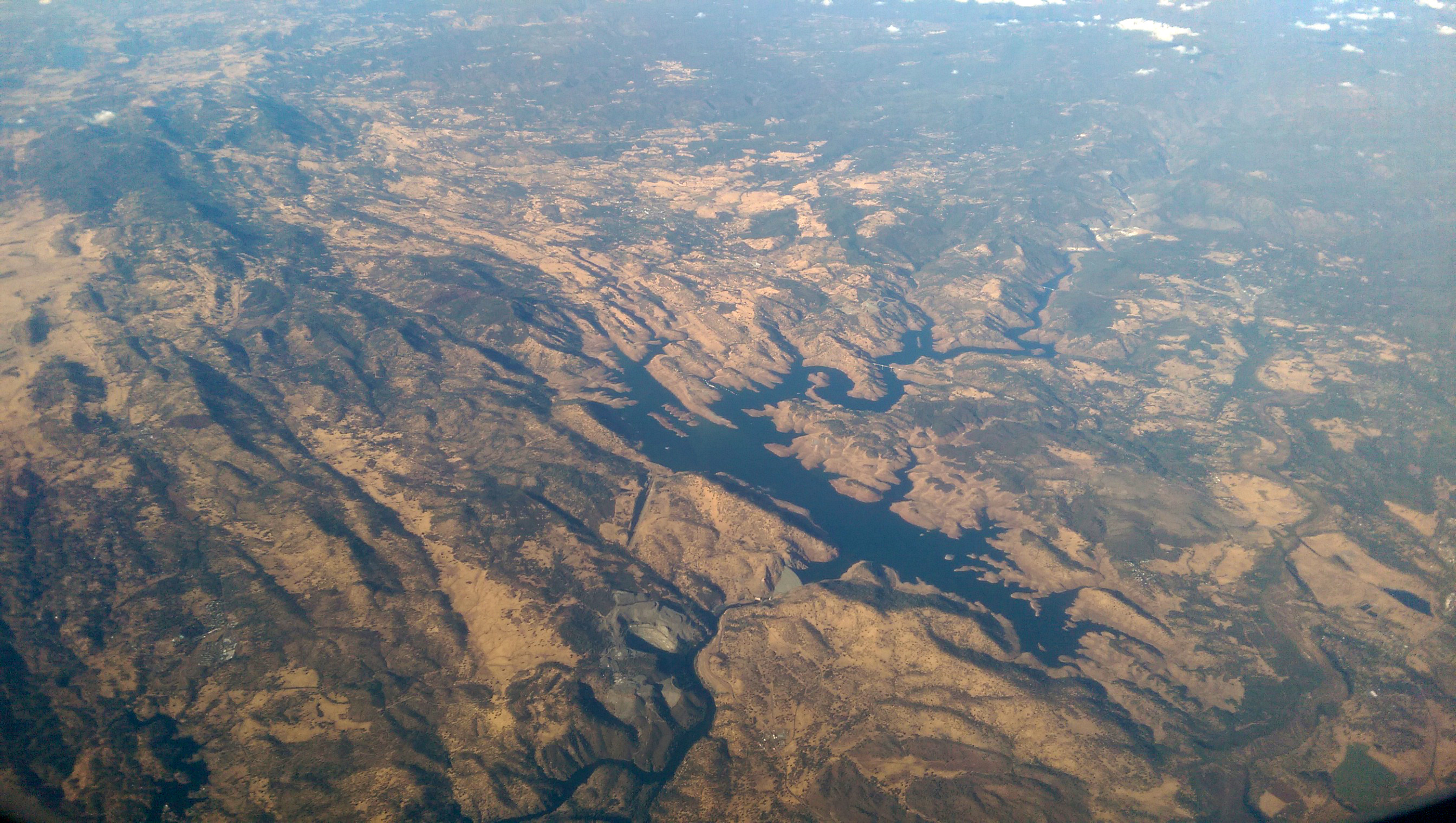
New Melones Lake in October 2016

== Climate ==
Climate data for New Melones Lake, California (1991–2020 normals, extremes 1992–present)
Month	Jan	Feb	Mar	Apr	May	Jun	Jul	Aug	Sep	Oct	Nov	Dec	Year
Record high °F (°C)	75 (24)	80 (27)	85 (29)	94 (34)	104 (40)	111 (44)	114 (46)	110 (43)	114 (46)	105 (41)	86 (30)	76 (24)	114 (46)
Mean daily maximum °F (°C)	57.3 (14.1)	60.6 (15.9)	64.8 (18.2)	70.0 (21.1)	79.4 (26.3)	89.3 (31.8)	97.1 (36.2)	96.2 (35.7)	90.7 (32.6)	79.7 (26.5)	66.0 (18.9)	57.4 (14.1)	75.7 (24.3)
Daily mean °F (°C)	47.8 (8.8)	50.1 (10.1)	54.2 (12.3)	57.9 (14.4)	65.9 (18.8)	74.2 (23.4)	81.3 (27.4)	80.3 (26.8)	75.5 (24.2)	66.0 (18.9)	55.0 (12.8)	47.6 (8.7)	63.0 (17.2)
Mean daily minimum °F (°C)	38.2 (3.4)	39.7 (4.3)	43.5 (6.4)	45.9 (7.7)	52.4 (11.3)	59.2 (15.1)	65.4 (18.6)	64.5 (18.1)	60.2 (15.7)	52.4 (11.3)	44.1 (6.7)	37.8 (3.2)	50.3 (10.2)
Record low °F (°C)	24 (−4)	25 (−4)	29 (−2)	31 (−1)	31 (−1)	40 (4)	45 (7)	43 (6)	34 (1)	36 (2)	29 (−2)	19 (−7)	19 (−7)
Average precipitation inches (mm)	5.85 (149)	4.85 (123)	4.77 (121)	2.58 (66)	1.48 (38)	0.36 (9.1)	0.03 (0.76)	0.04 (1.0)	0.21 (5.3)	1.51 (38)	2.91 (74)	5.16 (131)	29.75 (756)
Average snowfall inches (cm)	0.0 (0.0)	0.0 (0.0)	0.2 (0.51)	0.0 (0.0)	0.0 (0.0)	0.0 (0.0)	0.0 (0.0)	0.0 (0.0)	0.0 (0.0)	0.0 (0.0)	0.0 (0.0)	0.0 (0.0)	0.2 (0.51)
Average precipitation days (≥ 0.01 in)	13.3	11.3	10.9	6.9	4.8	1.9	0.3	0.4	1.2	4.0	8.1	12.0	75.1
Average snowy days (≥ 0.1 in)	0.0	0.0	0.0	0.0	0.0	0.0	0.0	0.0	0.0	0.0	0.0	0.0	0.0
Source: NOAA

== History ==
The Stanislaus River and environs experienced dramatic changes beginning with the Gold Rush. The site of the reservoir is at the very heart of Gold Country, and development began there with the arrival of the miners in the 1840s. Water was immediately diverted, the riverbeds scoured for gold, and the banks inhabited by miners and the businesses that served them. By 1900 the flowing water was used to create electricity. Some of it was diverted into canals for use in San Joaquin Valley agriculture.

The original Melones Dam was completed in 1926, forming a smaller Melones Lake reservoir.

=== New Melones Project ===
The New Melones Project was authorized in 1944 to create a much larger reservoir and to establish a new hydroelectric plant. It would also be specifically designed to prevent floods.

It was a controversial project. The dam's opponents argued that its presence would inundate the river valley, eliminate the natural whitewater rapids, flood many of the massive unique limestone cave formations characteristic of the area, and destroy archaeological resources found along the river. The environmental organization Friends of the River was formed to fight the dam. Initial archaeological surveys were made by the Smithsonian River Basin Surveys in 1948 (Fredrickson 1949). Further surveys were done by regional universities. The consensus after the surveys was that the dam would be built. Upon the dam's completion, the valley filled with water, covering the old mining town of Melones and the original Melones Dam.

The lake was constructed by the U.S. Army Corps of Engineers and transferred to the U.S. Bureau of Reclamation shortly after its completion in 1980.

Cultural resources affected by the project were transferred to the Department of the Interior with the Heritage Conservation and Recreation Services (HCRS, a short-lived organization that was established during the Carter administration) responsible for the archaeological mitigation program. New Melones is a unit of the Central Valley Project.

The reservoir was used to conceal five murder victims by Jurijus Kadamovas and Iouri Mikhel in late 2001 and early 2002.

== New Melones Visitor Center and Museum ==
The New Melones Visitor Center and Museum contains information about local history, cultural and natural history. Exhibits focus on the use of the Stanislaus River by prehistoric and historic peoples, including Miwok Indians, the California Gold Rush, ranchers, and the now defunct community of Robinson Ferry, renamed Melones in 1902. Other exhibits highlight the area's geologic past, natural history and the New Melones project.

== See also ==
- List of dams and reservoirs in California
- List of lakes in California
- List of largest reservoirs in the United States
- List of largest reservoirs of California
