= Greenwood, El Dorado County, California =

Unincorporated community in California, United States

Greenwood
- Unincorporated community
- Location in California Greenwood (the United States)
- Coordinates: 38°53′48″N 120°54′46″W
- Country: United States
- State: California
- County: El Dorado
- Elevation: 1,610 ft (490 m)

California Historical Landmark
- Reference no.: 521

Greenwood (formerly Long Valley, Green Valley, Lewisville, and Louisville) is an unincorporated community in El Dorado County, California, United States. It is located 4 miles (6.4 km) west of Georgetown, at an elevation of 1608 feet (490 m).

The place was originally called Long Valley, then Green Valley, then Lewisville, and finally Greenwood, in honor of John Greenwood, who set up a trading post there in 1848. The Louisville post office operated from 1851 to 1852, when it was moved and renamed to Greenwood. A schoolhouse operated at Greenwood until 1954, and since then local schoolchildren have been bused to Cool, although the school remains standing.

The community is now registered as California Historical Landmark #521.
