= New Bullards Bar Reservoir =

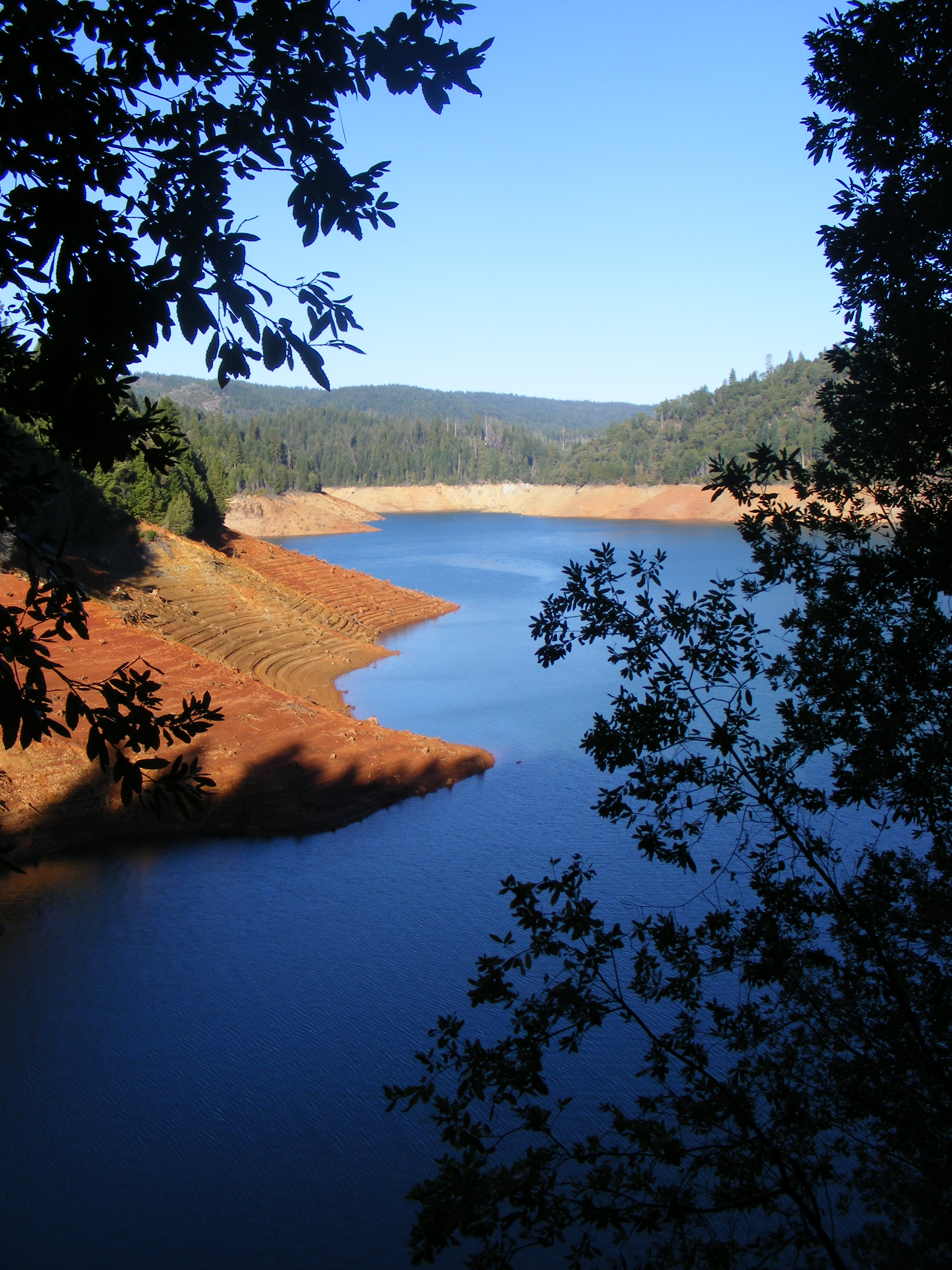

- Location within California Location within the United States
- Location: Yuba County, California
- Coordinates: 39.42903°N 121.13010°W
- Type: reservoir
- Basin countries: United States
- Max. length: 16 mi (26 km)
- Water volume: 969,600 acre⋅ft (1.1960×10^{9} m^{3})
- Shore length^{1}: 56 mi (90 km)
- Surface elevation: 1,956 ft (596 m)
- Settlements: Dobbins
- ^{1} Shore length is not a well-defined measure.

New Bullards Bar Reservoir is a large reservoir in northeastern Yuba County, California, United States, at an elevation of 2,000 feet (610 m) in the Tahoe National Forest and about 30 miles (50 km) northeast of Yuba City. The 969,600 acre-foot (1.1960×10^{9} m^{3}) reservoir is formed by New Bullards Bar Dam on the North Yuba River, a tributary of the Yuba River. It also receives a portion of the Middle Fork's flow that is diverted to the reservoir via tunnels.

== Dam ==
The dam is a 635-foot (194 m) high concrete variable radius arch dam. It was finished in 1970 and is owned by the Yuba Water Agency (Yuba County Water Agency, formally), which is a special district government agency based in Marysville, Ca. It is a multipurpose dam, but its most important function is flood control, which 170,000 acre-feet (210,000,000 m^{3}) of the reservoir's capacity is dedicated to. While this is only 17.5% of the reservoir's total capacity, it is enough to create a medium-sized reservoir by itself. The dam also provides water for irrigation, hydroelectricity production and recreation, including boating, water skiing, fishing, mountain biking and camping.

== Power ==
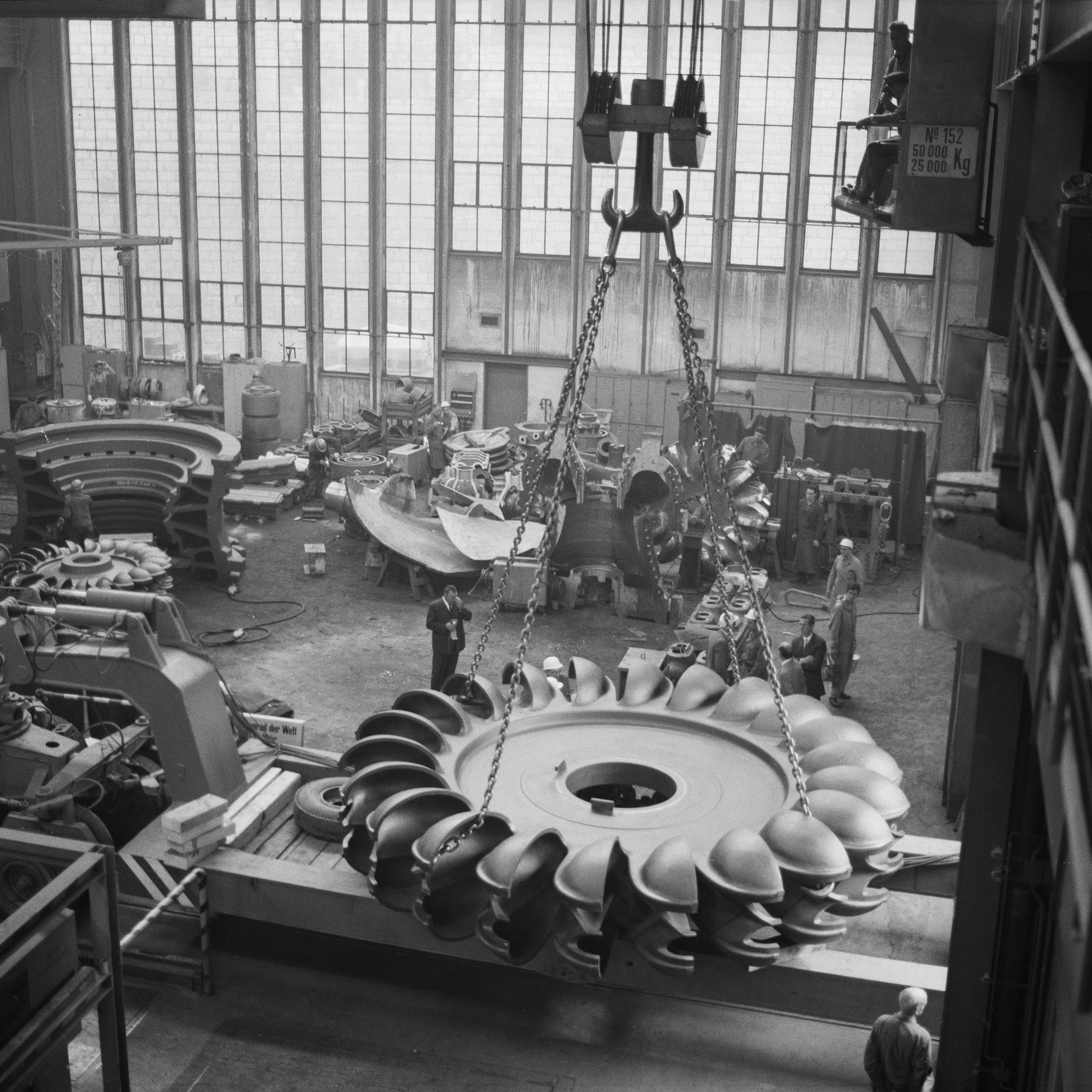
Pelton wheel for New Colgate after production in Switzerland

The reservoir provides water to power two hydroelectric plants, New Colgate Powerhouse and Fish Release Powerhouse. New Colgate Powerhouse is not located at the base of the dam, like most hydroelectric plants. Instead, the 14-foot (4.3 m) diameter New Colgate Tunnel carries the water about 5 miles (8 km) southwest of the dam to the powerhouse. This increases the head, which allows the plant to produce more electricity. The dam's Pelton wheels are the largest ever built and have a combined capacity of 315 MW. Some water is released at the base of the dam so that the streambed is not completely dewatered upstream of the New Colgate Powerhouse tailrace. This water powers the 150 kW Fish Release Powerhouse. In the event of a power outage, this plant can operate the dam's massive spillway gates.

== Recreation ==
Bullards Bar Reservoir is also used for outdoor recreation. It is 16 miles (26 km) in length and has 60+ miles of shoreline. Water Ski Magazine rates Bullards Bar Reservoir as one of the best recreational lakes in the United States. Bullards Bar is a mountain biking destination, with about 19 miles of hiking and biking trails, primarily on the east side of the lake. The trails are maintained by the USFS Yuba Ranger District and volunteers from Bicyclists of Nevada County. Bullards Bar offers two boat launching facilities with one launch ramp adjacent to Emerald Cove Marina. Emerald Cove Marina offers a variety of services, such as a general store, gasoline, boat moorage, and camping as well as houseboat, ski, patio, and fishing boat rentals.

There are two boat ramps, Cottage Creek (usable until the reservoir falls below 1,822 feet) and Dark Day (usable until the reservoir falls below 1798 feet). Both ramps are free.

The California Office of Environmental Health Hazard Assessment (OEHHA) has developed a safe eating advisory for fish caught in New Bullards Bar Reservoir based on their levels of mercury or PCBs.

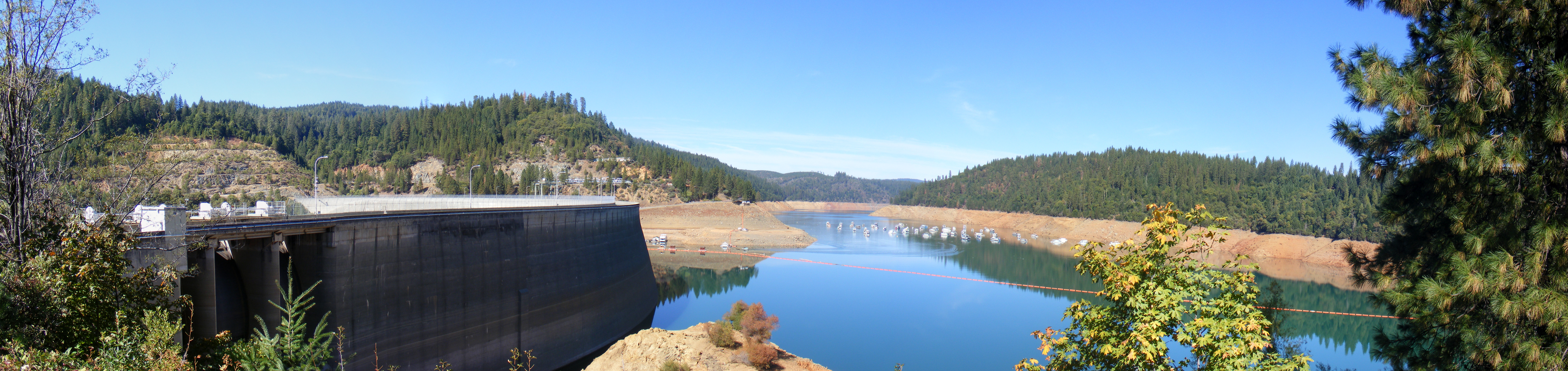
A view of Bullards Bar dam and reservoir from Marysville Road

== History ==
Foster Bar or Foster's Bar was a former settlement in Yuba County that was inundated by the New Bullards Bar Reservoir.

== See also ==
- Bar (river morphology)
- List of dams and reservoirs in California
- List of lakes in California
- List of largest reservoirs of California
