= Higgins Corner, California =

Unincorporated community in California, United States

Higgins Corner
- Unincorporated community
- Location in California Higgins Corner (the United States)
- Coordinates: 39°02′34″N 121°05′42″W
- Country: United States
- State: California
- County: Nevada County
- Elevation: 1,427 ft (435 m)

Higgins Corner is an unincorporated community in Nevada County, California. It lies at an elevation of 1427 feet (435 m). Higgins Corner is located 12.5 miles (20.1 km) south of Grass Valley.

== History ==
Higgins Corner was named after a Gold Rush settler, Michael J. Higgins. The name, Higgins Corner was first recorded in the 1860s. Michael J. Higgins homesteaded 160 acres of land at Wolf Road. A long time resident (since 1955), Willard Shoellerman, states that the area has been called Higgins Corner for a century.

A Bill Higgins arrived in the area in the late 1800s; while he coincidentally shared the name Higgins, he was not related to Michael J. Higgins.

During the Gold Rush times, the Higgins Corner Bar was the meeting place that a gold-running gang used as their headquarters. This resulted in the kidnapping and eventual killing of several children.

In 1952 a temporary San Quentin prisoner forestry camp was located at Higgins Corner.

== Description ==
A 2014 article on Higgins Corner states that the area includes the Lake of the Pines housing development, several small-scale shopping centers, the Forest Lake Christian School, the Higgins Lions community club, six churches, several ranches and "cottage home businesses". It also has a fire department that provides service for the area along with the Higgins County Department of Forestry.

The Lake of the Pines housing complex was formerly a cattle ranch. As of the 1980s it contained 3,000 lots, that sustained housing for 4,500 residents.

== Climate ==
According to the Köppen Climate Classification system, Higgins Corner has a warm-summer Mediterranean climate, abbreviated "Csa" on climate maps.
