= Melones, California =

Melones
- Former settlement
- Location in California
- Coordinates: 38°00′45″N 120°29′55″W
- Country: United States
- State: California
- County: Calaveras
- Elevation: 955 ft (291 m)

Melones (Spanish for "Melons") is a former settlement in Calaveras County, California, United States, now submerged beneath a reservoir named New Melones Lake. It lay at an elevation of 955 feet (291 m). Melones was founded on the site of a ferry operated from 1848 by John W. Robinson and Stephen Mead. The town initially took its name from the ferry.

== History ==
The first post office opened in Robinsons Ferry in 1879, the name was changed to Robinson's in 1895, and to Melones in 1902. The post office was closed in 1932, re-established in 1933 and closed for good in 1942.

In January 1923 Paramount Pictures chose Melones to construct a complete 1849 mining camp set there for the motion picture The Covered Wagon. The studio sent an authentic Sierra Railroad train built in 1897 to the location via the Angels Branch line to Melones.

The site was submerged under New Melones Lake when the New Melones Dam finished construction and began to fill in April 1, 1978.
