= Cool, California =

Unincorporated community in California, United States

Cool
- Unincorporated community
- Highway 49 entering Cool

- Location in California Cool (the United States)
- Coordinates: 38°53′14″N 121°00′53″W
- Country: United States
- State: California
- County: El Dorado
- Elevation: 1,532 ft (467 m)

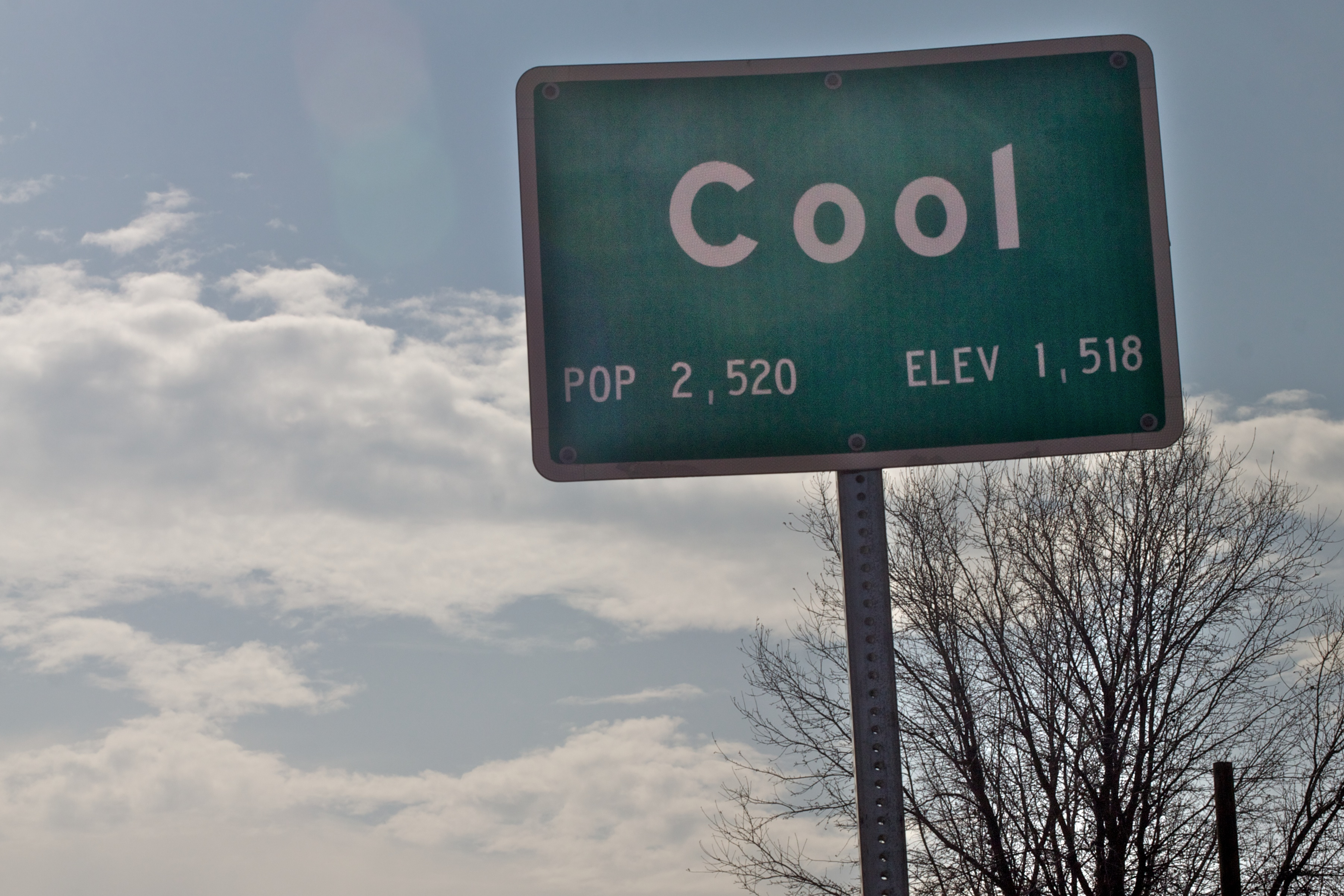

Cool, formerly known as Cave Valley, is a small town in El Dorado County, California, United States, approximately 40 miles (64 km) from Sacramento, the state capital. Cool is at an elevation of 1,532 feet (467 m).

It is served by the area code 530 with a ZIP code of 95614.

== Geography ==
It is built on State Route 49 between Auburn and Placerville on a hill at an elevation more than 1,500 feet (450 m) in an area full of trees, trails, camping, and other recreational activities.

The temperature ranges from 75° to 105 °F (23 °C to 41 °C) in the summer and 25° to 50 °F (-4 °C to 10 °C) in the winter.

=== Climate ===
According to the Köppen Climate Classification system, Cool has a hot-summer Mediterranean climate, abbreviated "Csa" on climate maps.

== History ==
The first post office was established in 1885. Penobscot Public House, established in 1850, was a way station and stage coach stop during the days of the Gold Rush. The Penobscot Ranch still exists today. Cool, California, is a small unincorporated community located in El Dorado County in the Sierra Nevada foothills. Its history dates back to the California Gold Rush of the mid-1800s, when it was part of a thriving region of mining towns. The town was originally known as "Cave Valley" due to nearby limestone caves but was renamed "Cool" in the 1880s, reportedly after a Methodist preacher named Aaron Cool. While mining declined over time, Cool remained a quiet rural community. Today, it is known for its scenic location near the American River Canyon and serves as a gateway to outdoor activities, including hiking and horseback riding on the Western States Trail. The community retains a rustic charm and a strong connection to its Gold Rush heritage.

== Ultramarathon ==
The Way Too Cool 50 Kilometer run starts and ends in the town in early March. It follows sections of the Western States Trail with more than 4000 ft (1200+ m) elevation change along its 31-mile length.

== Politics ==
In the state legislature, Cool is in the 1st senatorial district, represented by Republican Megan Dahle, and the 5th Assembly district, represented by Republican Joe Patterson.

Federally, Cool is in California's 4th congressional district, represented by Democrat Mike Thompson.

== Education ==
The Black Oak Mine Unified School District serves Cool. Cool currently has just one school – Northside STEAM School – catering to elementary students (TK–6). Residents are zoned to Golden Sierra Junior Senior High School for grades 7–12.

Until 2007 there was also another K–8 school in Cool, the Cool Christian School.
