= Georgetown, California =

Georgetown
- Unincorporated Community; Census Designated Place
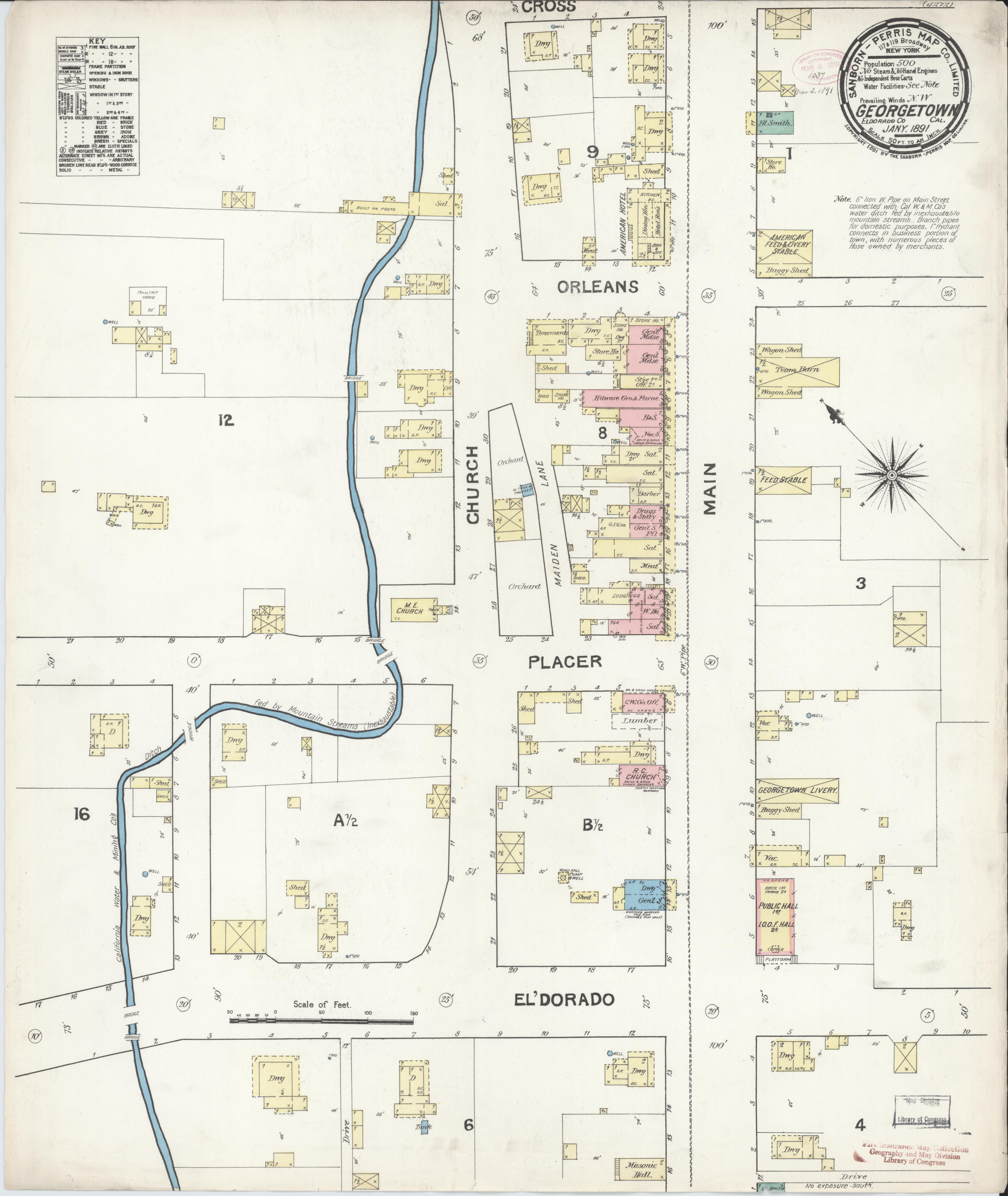
- 1891 Sanborn insurance map of Georgetown

- Location in El Dorado County and the state of California

- Location in the United States
- Coordinates: 38°54′25″N 120°50′19″W
- Country: United States
- State: California
- County: El Dorado

Area
  - Total: 15.133 sq mi (39.193 km^{2})
  - Land: 15.128 sq mi (39.182 km^{2})
  - Water: 0.0042 sq mi (0.011 km^{2}) 0.03%
- Elevation: 2,654 ft (809 m)

Population (2020)
  - Total: 2,255
  - Density: 149.1/sq mi (57.55/km^{2})
- Time zone: UTC-8 (Pacific (PST))
  - Summer (DST): UTC-7 (PDT)
- ZIP code: 95634
- Area codes: 530, 837
- FIPS code: 06-29350
- GNIS feature ID: 1658606

California Historical Landmark
- Reference no.: 484

Georgetown (formerly Growlersburg) is a census-designated place (CDP) in El Dorado County, California, United States. It is the northeasternmost town in the California Mother Lode. The population was 2,255 in the 2020 census, 2,367 in 2010, and 962 in 2000. The town is registered as California Historical Landmark #484.

== History ==
Founded August 7, 1849, by George Phipps and party, Georgetown was nicknamed "Growlersburg" due to the heavy, gold-laden quartz rocks that "growled" in the miners' pants as they walked around town. Georgetown is named for George Washington. The first post office was established in 1851.

After a disastrous fire in 1852, the old town was moved from the canyon in lower Main Street to its present site, and, unique in early-day planning, Main Street was laid out 100 feet (30 m) wide, with side streets 60 feet (18 m). After this new reconstruction, the residents of the city proclaimed their town as the "Pride of the Mountains".

The hub of an immensely rich gold mining area, Georgetown had a population of about three thousand from 1854 to 1856. As a gold rush camp, the community outlasted many other towns, because the gold found nearby was solid primary deposits, as opposed to placer deposits. Gold production continued until after the turn of the 20th century.

During the Civil War the people of the town wanted to show their support for the Union. They raised the Stars and Stripes with the inscription "Justice and Equality" on July 4, 1861.

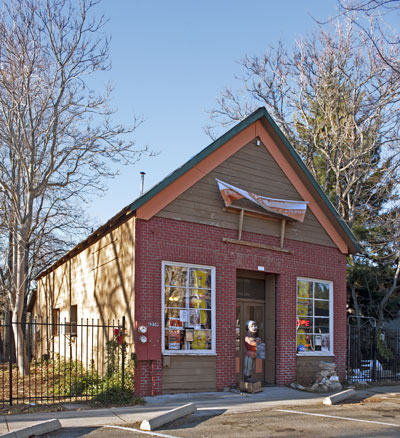
Armory building constructed in Georgetown in 1862, during the American Civil War

== Geography ==
According to the United States Census Bureau, the CDP has a total area of 15.1 square miles (39 km^{2}), of which over 99% is land.

For the 2000 census, the CDP's area was smaller. It had a total area of 4.1 square miles (11 km^{2}), of which 4.1 square miles (11 km^{2}) was land and 0.24% was water.

=== Climate ===
According to the Köppen climate classification system, Georgetown has a warm-summer Mediterranean climate, abbreviated "Csa" on climate maps. Due to orographic lifting, Georgetown gets about four times the amount of precipitation as the western valley locations. A small amount of it falls as snow that melts quickly due to the above freezing temperatures, but for no more than four inches a year. The high precipitation allows for vegetation to flourish, but when a lot of it becomes dry during the hot and dry summers, wildfires become a prominent risk.

Climate data for Georgetown, California, 1981–2010 normals
| Month | Jan | Feb | Mar | Apr | May | Jun | Jul | Aug | Sep | Oct | Nov | Dec | Year |
|---|---|---|---|---|---|---|---|---|---|---|---|---|---|
| Record high °F (°C) | 76 (24) | 78 (26) | 88 (31) | 88 (31) | 101 (38) | 104 (40) | 107 (42) | 106 (41) | 111 (44) | 100 (38) | 84 (29) | 79 (26) | 111 (44) |
| Mean maximum °F (°C) | 66 (19) | 69 (21) | 72 (22) | 80 (27) | 87 (31) | 96 (36) | 99 (37) | 100 (38) | 97 (36) | 88 (31) | 75 (24) | 64 (18) | 100 (38) |
| Mean daily maximum °F (°C) | 52.5 (11.4) | 54.1 (12.3) | 58.0 (14.4) | 64.0 (17.8) | 71.2 (21.8) | 81.7 (27.6) | 90.6 (32.6) | 90.7 (32.6) | 85.4 (29.7) | 73.9 (23.3) | 58.3 (14.6) | 50.8 (10.4) | 69.3 (20.7) |
| Daily mean °F (°C) | 44.2 (6.8) | 44.8 (7.1) | 48.1 (8.9) | 52.4 (11.3) | 59.1 (15.1) | 68.7 (20.4) | 76.5 (24.7) | 76.3 (24.6) | 71.2 (21.8) | 61.5 (16.4) | 49.2 (9.6) | 43.1 (6.2) | 57.9 (14.4) |
| Mean daily minimum °F (°C) | 35.9 (2.2) | 35.6 (2.0) | 38.1 (3.4) | 41.1 (5.1) | 46.9 (8.3) | 55.7 (13.2) | 62.4 (16.9) | 62.0 (16.7) | 56.9 (13.8) | 49.2 (9.6) | 39.9 (4.4) | 35.2 (1.8) | 46.6 (8.1) |
| Mean minimum °F (°C) | 24 (−4) | 26 (−3) | 27 (−3) | 30 (−1) | 35 (2) | 41 (5) | 50 (10) | 50 (10) | 43 (6) | 35 (2) | 28 (−2) | 25 (−4) | 21 (−6) |
| Record low °F (°C) | 11 (−12) | 15 (−9) | 15 (−9) | 19 (−7) | 26 (−3) | 31 (−1) | 39 (4) | 39 (4) | 31 (−1) | 23 (−5) | 21 (−6) | 9 (−13) | 9 (−13) |
| Average precipitation inches (mm) | 8.95 (227) | 8.81 (224) | 8.30 (211) | 4.29 (109) | 2.22 (56) | .69 (18) | .03 (0.76) | .07 (1.8) | .50 (13) | 2.78 (71) | 6.05 (154) | 8.30 (211) | 50.99 (1,296.56) |
| Average snowfall inches (cm) | 2.5 (6.4) | 3.5 (8.9) | 1.9 (4.8) | 0.5 (1.3) | 0.1 (0.25) | 0.0 (0.0) | 0.0 (0.0) | 0.0 (0.0) | 0.0 (0.0) | 0.0 (0.0) | 0.3 (0.76) | 2.9 (7.4) | 11.7 (29.81) |

== Demographics ==
Historical population
| Census | Pop. | Note | %± |
|---|---|---|---|
| 2000 | 962 | | — |
| 2010 | 2,367 | | 146.0% |
| 2020 | 2,255 | | −4.7% |
U.S. Decennial Census; 1860–1870 1880-1890; 1900 1910 1920; 1930 1940 1950; 1960 1970 1980; 1990 2000 2010

Georgetown first appeared as a census designated place in the 2000 U.S. census.

=== 2020 census ===
As of the 2020 census, Georgetown had a population of 2,255 and a population density of 149.1 inhabitants per square mile (57.6/km^{2}). The median age was 50.4 years. The age distribution was 17.9% under the age of 18, 5.1% aged 18 to 24, 20.8% aged 25 to 44, 30.0% aged 45 to 64, and 26.3% who were 65 years of age or older. For every 100 females, there were 111.9 males, and for every 100 females age 18 and over, there were 114.6 males age 18 and over.

0.0% of residents lived in urban areas, while 100.0% lived in rural areas. The census reported that 95.0% of the population lived in households, 0.5% lived in non-institutionalized group quarters, and 4.5% were institutionalized.

There were 874 households, of which 23.1% had children under the age of 18 living in them. Of all households, 53.0% were married-couple households, 8.8% were cohabiting couple households, 17.8% were households with a male householder and no spouse or partner present, and 20.4% were households with a female householder and no spouse or partner present. About 22.7% of all households were made up of individuals and 12.2% had someone living alone who was 65 years of age or older. The average household size was 2.45. There were 596 families (68.2% of all households).

There were 1,028 housing units, of which 15.0% were vacant. The homeowner vacancy rate was 0.3% and the rental vacancy rate was 12.2%. Of occupied units, 79.4% were owner-occupied and 20.6% were occupied by renters.

Racial composition as of the 2020 census
| Race | Number | Percent |
|---|---|---|
| White | 1,839 | 81.6% |
| Black or African American | 41 | 1.8% |
| American Indian and Alaska Native | 38 | 1.7% |
| Asian | 10 | 0.4% |
| Native Hawaiian and Other Pacific Islander | 3 | 0.1% |
| Some other race | 78 | 3.5% |
| Two or more races | 246 | 10.9% |
| Hispanic or Latino (of any race) | 232 | 10.3% |

== Politics ==
In the state legislature, Georgetown is in the 4th senatorial district, represented by Republican Marie Alvarado-Gil, and the 5th Assembly district, represented by Republican Joe Patterson.

Federally, Georgetown is in California's 3rd congressional district, represented by Independent Kevin Kiley.

== Education ==
The Black Oak Mine Unified School District, headquartered in Georgetown, serves Georgetown.

== Notable person ==
- Ferris Fain, MLB first baseman
