= California Historical Landmarks in Amador County =

This list includes properties and districts listed on the California Historical Landmark listing in Amador County, California. Click the "Map of all coordinates" link to the right to view a Google map of all properties and districts with latitude and longitude coordinates in the table below.

Image		Landmark name	Location	City or town	Summary
Argonaut Mine	786	Argonaut Mine	38°21′53″N 120°47′14″W	Jackson	Shares an entry with Kennedy Mine
Upload Photo	41	Big Bar	Big Bar Rd. & Highway 49; 38°18′43″N 120°43′12″W	Jackson	
Butte Store	39	Butte Store	State Highway 49 at milepost 1.4; 38°19′32″N 120°44′07″W	Jackson	
Upload Photo	1001	Chaw'se Roundhouse	14881 Pine Grove/Volcano Rd. 38°25′27″N 120°38′36″W	Pine Grove	
Upload Photo	37	Clinton	Historic district 38°22′34″N 120°40′06″W	Clinton	
Community Methodist Church of Ione	506	Community Methodist Church of Ione	150 W. Marlette; 38°21′00″N 120°55′58″W	Ione	Also on the NRHP list as NPS-77000287
Upload Photo	762	D'Agostini Winery	14430 Shenandoah Rd. 38°31′59″N 120°45′18″W	Plymouth	
D. Stewart Co. Store	788	D. Stewart Co. Store	18 E. Main St. 38°21′10″N 120°55′59″W	Ione	
Drytown	31	Drytown	Historic district 38°26′28″N 120°51′16″W	Drytown	
Upload Photo	38	Irishtown	Historic district 38°23′20″N 120°40′29″W	Pine Grove	
Jackson Gate	118	Jackson Gate	Big Bar Rd. & Highway 49; 38°22′05″N 120°46′32″W	Jackson	
Kennedy Mine	786	Kennedy Mine	38°21′53″N 120°47′14″W	Jackson	Shares an entry with Argonaut Mine. Also on the NRHP list as NPS-81000146
Upload Photo	40	Kirkwood's	Hwy 88 & Carson Pass; 38°42′10″N 120°04′21″W	Kirkwood	
Knight Foundry	1007	Knight Foundry	81 Eureka St. 38°23′36″N 120°47′01″W	Sutter Creek	Also on the NRHP list as NPS-75000423
Upload Photo	30	Lancha Plana	North shore of Camanche Reservoir; 38°13′29″N 120°54′07″W	Buena Vista	
Upload Photo	28	Maiden's Grave	Carson Pass; 38°37′54″N 120°10′16″W	Kirkwood	
Upload Photo	36	Middle Bar	Middle Bar Rd at Mokelumne River; 38°17′55″N 120°45′01″W	Jackson	
Old Emigrant Road	662	Old Emigrant Road	State Highway 88 at Mud Lake Rd. 38°38′15″N 120°08′32″W	Kirkwood	
Oleta (Old Fiddletown)	35	Oleta (Old Fiddletown)	Historic district 38°30′14″N 120°45′20″W	Fiddletown	
Upload Photo	34	Pioneer Hall	113 Main St. 38°20′57″N 120°46′27″W	Jackson	
Upload Photo	470	Plymouth Trading Post	On Main St., between Mill & Mineral Sts. 38°28′52″N 120°50′51″W	Plymouth	Later Plymouth Consolidated Mine office
Preston Castle	867	Preston Castle	On Main St., between Mill & Mineral Sts. 38°21′40″N 120°56′09″W	Ione	Also on the NRHP list as NPS-75000422
Upload Photo	715	Site of the first amateur astronomical observatory of record in California	Consolation & Main St. 38°26′34″N 120°37′53″W	Volcano	
Upload Photo	865	Site of Jackson's Pioneer Jewish Synagogue	Church & Main Sts. 38°21′04″N 120°46′24″W	Jackson	Marker is at Jackson Grammar School
Sutter Creek	322	Sutter Creek	Historic district 38°23′35″N 120°48′09″W	Sutter Creek	
Volcano	29	Volcano	Intersection of Main and Consolation Sts. 38°26′35″N 120°37′51″W	Volcano	

== See also ==
- National Register of Historic Places listings in Amador County, California
- List of California Historical Landmarks
