= National Register of Historic Places listings in Amador County, California =

Location of Amador County in California

This is a list of the National Register of Historic Places listings in Amador County, California.

This is intended to be a complete list of the properties and districts on the National Register of Historic Places in Amador County, California, United States. Latitude and longitude coordinates are provided for many National Register properties and districts; these locations may be seen together in a Google map.

There are 22 properties and districts listed on the National Register in the county.

This National Park Service list is complete through NPS recent listings posted September 4, 2026.

== Current listings ==
	Name on the Register	Image	Date listed	Location	City or town	Description
1	Amador County Hospital Building	Amador County Hospital Building	February 23, 1972 (#72000215)	708 Court St. 38°21′08″N 120°45′59″W	Jackson	
2	John A. Butterfield House	John A. Butterfield House	September 11, 1986 (#86002412)	115 Broadway; 38°20′49″N 120°46′15″W	Jackson	
3	Chichizola Family Store Complex	Chichizola Family Store Complex	August 14, 1992 (#92000979)	1316-1330 Jackson Gate Rd. 38°22′03″N 120°46′23″W	Jackson	
4	Grace Blair DePue House and Indian Museum	Grace Blair DePue House and Indian Museum	May 7, 1982 (#82002169)	215 Court St. 38°20′58″N 120°46′13″W	Jackson	
5	Fiddletown	Fiddletown	June 7, 1978 (#78000655)	Off CA 49; 38°30′20″N 120°45′41″W	Fiddletown	
6	Five Mile Drive-Sutter Creek Bridge	Five Mile Drive-Sutter Creek Bridge	April 11, 1986 (#86000734)	Five Mile Drive; 38°21′14″N 120°57′27″W	Ione	
7	Indian Grinding Rock	Indian Grinding Rock	May 6, 1971 (#71000133)	Indian Grinding Rock State Historic Park; 38°25′27″N 120°38′36″W	Volcano	
8	Ione City Centenary Church	Ione City Centenary Church	May 26, 1977 (#77000287)	150 W. Marlette St. 38°21′00″N 120°55′58″W	Ione	
9	Jackson Downtown Historic District	Jackson Downtown Historic District	April 14, 2000 (#00000365)	Roughly along Main St. from 215 Main St. to 14 Broadway; 38°20′57″N 120°46′22″W	Jackson	
10	Kennedy Mine Historic District	Kennedy Mine Historic District	January 22, 2009 (#08001347)	12594 Kennedy Mine Rd. 38°22′02″N 120°46′54″W	Jackson	
11	Kennedy Tailing Wheels	Kennedy Tailing Wheels	July 7, 1981 (#81000146)	Jackson Gate Rd. 38°21′34″N 120°46′16″W	Jackson	
12	Kirkwood Lake Tract		December 11, 2010 (#09001054)	1/2 mile north of California State Route 88 along the shoreline of Lake Kirkwood in the Eldorado National Forest; 38°42′23″N 120°05′18″W	Pioneer	
13	Knight's Foundry and Shops	Knight's Foundry and Shops	July 1, 1975 (#75000423)	13 Eureka St. 38°23′36″N 120°47′00″W	Sutter Creek	
14	William J. Paugh House	William J. Paugh House	June 5, 2007 (#07000507)	406 Pitt St. 38°21′05″N 120°46′14″W	Jackson	
15	Preston Castle	Preston Castle	July 30, 1975 (#75000422)	N of Ione on Preston Ave. 38°21′40″N 120°56′09″W	Ione	
16	Preston School of Industry	Preston School of Industry	October 10, 2024 (#100009890)	201 Waterman Road; 38°21′31″N 120°56′09″W	Ione	
17	Saint Sava Serbian Orthodox Church	Saint Sava Serbian Orthodox Church	March 6, 1986 (#86000385)	724 N. Main; 38°21′21″N 120°46′31″W	Jackson	
18	Scully Ranch	Scully Ranch	November 21, 1978 (#78000656)	Marlette St. 38°21′13″N 120°57′34″W	Ione	
19	St. George Hotel	St. George Hotel	September 7, 1984 (#84000757)	2 Main St. 38°26′31″N 120°37′47″W	Volcano	
20	Sutter Creek Grammar School	Sutter Creek Grammar School	December 12, 1976 (#76000477)	Between Broad and Cole Sts. 38°23′43″N 120°47′01″W	Sutter Creek	
21	C.W. Swain House	C.W. Swain House	October 8, 2014 (#14000824)	311 Church & 330 Buena Vista Sts. 38°21′01″N 120°55′58″W	Ione	
22	George and Eliza Withington House	George and Eliza Withington House	January 14, 2015 (#14001148)	10 Welch Ln. 38°21′17″N 120°56′02″W	Ione	

== See also ==
- List of National Historic Landmarks in California
- National Register of Historic Places listings in California
- California Historical Landmarks in Amador County, California
