= Sarahsville =

Sarahsville may refer to:

- Sarahsville, former name of Bath, California
- Sarahsville, former name of Clinton, California
- Sarahsville, Ohio
