= Sarahsville, California =

Sarahsville, California may refer to:

- Bath, California
- Clinton, California
