= D'Agostini Winery =

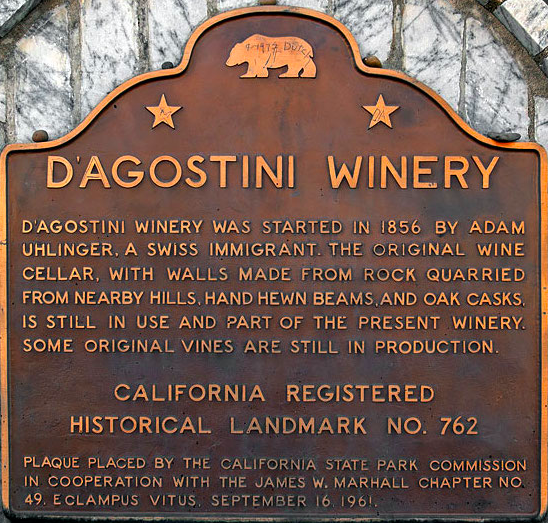
- California Registered Landmark plaque

- Location in California Location in United States
- 38.53244°N 120.75530°W
- Location: Plymouth-Shenandoah Rd., Plymouth, California

History
- Built: 1856

Site notes
- Governing body: Private

California Historical Landmark
- Reference no.: 762

D'Agostini Winery refers to both a winery in Healdsburg, California (Sonoma County) owned by Armagan Champagne Cellars as well as the original vineyard, winery, and wine cellar located in Plymouth, Amador County, which are owned by Sobon Estate Winery. The original winery is registered as a California Historical Landmark.

D'Agostini Winery, now Sobon Estate, is the oldest winery in California that still operates today. It was started in 1856 by Adam Uhlinger, a Swiss immigrant, who brought grapevines with him from Europe to Amador County. It was thought to be the first place where Zinfandel was planted in California, but later research has shown that many people were involved in bringing Zinfandel to California and that it is impossible to determine who truly was first. It is, however, the oldest in the state to continuously make Zinfandel and some of the original vines are even still in production.

In 1911, the winery and its 125 acres (0.51 km^{2}) of vineyard were purchased by Enrico D'Agostini, whom the winery is now named after. Armagan Champagne Cellars purchased the business in 1984, and the Amador County vineyard and wine cellar were sold to the Sobon family in 1989. Thus, bottles sold under the D'Agostini label are produced by Armagan, but the wine produced from the original vines comes from Sobon.

The original wine cellar, with walls made from rock quarried from nearby hills, hand-hewn beams, and oak casks, is still standing and is now part of the Shenandoah Valley Museum, which displays agriculture and wine artifacts.
