= Camp O'pera, California =

Former settlement and mining camp in California

Coordinates: 38.2962°N 120.8912°W

Camp O'pera (also spelled Camp Opera) is a former settlement and mining camp in Amador County, California, United States. It was founded by Mexicans in the summer of 1849 near French Camp, southeast of Ione.

By 1853, it was growing and by 1857 was at its height. By the early 1860s, the town was in decline. Camp O'pera was a reputed hideout for the infamous outlaw Joaquin Murieta.
