= Sobon Estate Winery =

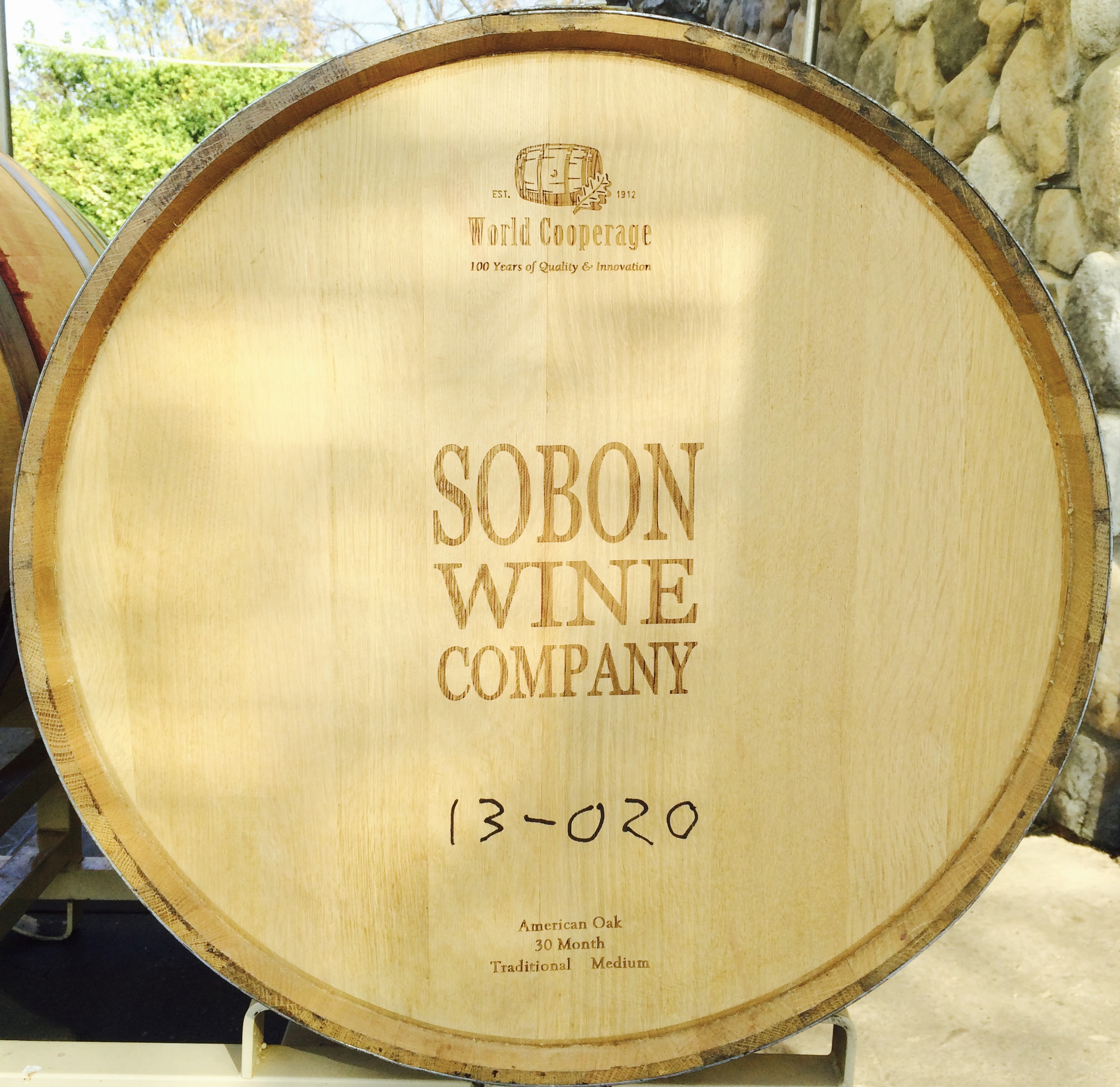
- California Registered Landmark plaque

- Location in California Location in United States
- 38.53244°N 120.75530°W
- Location: Plymouth-Shenandoah Rd., Plymouth, California

History
- Built: 1856

Site notes
- Architect: Adam Uhlinger
- Governing body: Private

California Historical Landmark
- Official name: D'Agostini Winery
- Reference no.: 762

Sobon Estate winery, located in Plymouth, Amador County, is the oldest winery in California and is registered as California Historical Landmark number 762. It was started in 1856, by Adam Uhlinger a Swiss immigrant who is one of the people credited with bringing Zinfandel to America. This also makes Sobon Estate the longest continuous producer of Zinfandel in the state of California.

In 1911, after Uhlinger's death in 1880, his sons sold the winery to Enrico D'Agostini. Enrico's children continued the winery production until 1984, when they sold the winery to Armagan Odziker. Odziker then kept the winery for five years before selling it to Leon and Shirley Sobon who owned Shenandoah Vineyards nearby in 1989. Today the winery is still owned and operated by the Sobon Family under Sobon Wine Company LLC.
