= Plymouth Trading Post =

California Historical Landmark in California, United States

- Location within California Location within the United States
- 38.481133°N 120.847549°W
- Location: 9454 Main Street Plymouth, California in Amador County

California Historical Landmark
- Reference no.: 470

The Plymouth Trading Post is a brick building in Plymouth, California in Amador County, United States. The brick building was built in 1857 by hand by Joe Williams in 1857, to be his Trading Post. The Trading Post closed and the building became the headquarters of Plymouth Consolidated Mine in 1873. Plymouth Consolidated Mine was formed when a number of small mines combined. The building was the Plymouth Consolidated Mine main office and its commissary. Plymouth Trading Post is registered as California Historical Landmark #41, starting August 30, 1950. The Trading Post served the town and nearby Plymouth Mine. The building survived the 1877 that burned down much of the town. The brick walls foundations are 30 inches thick. The floor support beams are 12x12 inches of wood. Joe Williams "dug" the basement with dynamite to remove the shale rock below the building. There were hitching posts ring on the side of the building. Plymouth Consolidated Mine's Pacific shaft, was the deepest hard rock shaft at 4,450 feet by 1925 working the Plymouth gold vain. The main haul of gold was between 1883 and 1889, when it operated 160 stamps that crushed 400 tons of quartz ore a day. The Plymouth Consolidated Mine mined over $13,500,000 of gold and closed in 1947. Some of the mines that Consolidated in 1883 were: Plymouth, Empire, and Amador Pacific mining companies. The mines were all located in the northern part of Mother Lode Gold Belt of the Sierra Nevada foothills at an elevation of 332 feet. After consolidation, the company had 126.3 acres of land that included: the Plymouth, Southerland, Oaks, Pacific, Simpson, Aden, Reese, Phoenix East claims, the Phoenix mill site, and interests in the Reese and Woolford, Indiana, Rising Star, Conville, and Beta claims. The first gold in the area was found in 1852. The Plymouth Consolidated Mine was idle from 1892 to 1911.

== See also ==
- California Historical Landmarks in Amador County
- Smith Mine disaster
- Saint Sava Serbian Orthodox Church (Jackson, California)
- Monongah mining disaster
