= Middle Bar, California =

Coordinates: 38.2976°N 120.75°W

Middle Bar
- Interactive map of Middle Bar
- Location: 2.8 miles (4.5 km) south of State Route 49, on Middle Bar Road at the Mokelumne River

History
- Built: 1850

California Historical Landmark
- Reference no.: 36

Middle Bar is a former mining town on the Mokelumne River in Amador County, California, United States. It is a California Historical Landmark.

== History ==
Middle Bar was founded in 1850 by English miners during the California Gold Rush. A mine in the area produced gold quartz.

In 1851, the Middle Bar Bridge was built over the Mokelumne River to handle the large amount of gold seekers coming through the area. The following years, 1852, a flood washed the bridge away. Another bridge was built with claims stating it was high enough it would not get washed away. It was finished in November, 1852, and cost $25,000 (~$739,858 in 2024) to build. It stood for approximately ten years until another flood dislocated the bridge.

After the first gold rush, the area experienced a second round of increased population in the 1920s during a smaller mining rush.

Eventually, the homes of Middle Bar were purchased by the East Bay Municipal Utility District. The company had built the Pardee Dam, six miles away.

== Present day ==
In the present day a truss bridge built by the Clinton Bridge and Iron Works bearing the date 1912 crosses the Mokelumne River at the town site, connecting the river banks in Amador and Calaveras counties.

== See also ==
- California Historical Landmarks in Amador County, California
- Mining communities of the California Gold Rush
