= Irishtown, California =

Irishtown
- Former settlement
- Location in California
- Coordinates: 38°23′20″N 120°40′29″W
- Country: United States
- State: California
- County: Amador
- Elevation: 1,972 ft (601 m)
- GNIS feature ID: 1733395

California Historical Landmark
- Reference no.: 38

Irishtown (also, Irish Town) is a former settlement in Amador County, California, United States. It was located 1.5 miles (2.4 km) south-southwest of Pine Grove, at an elevation of 1972 feet (601 m). The townsite lies within the boundaries of Pine Grove. Irishtown is a former Miwok settlement.

== History ==
When the first white people arrived to the area, en route to finding mines, they saw a "city of wigwams." The Miwok also left signs of bedrock mortars in the stone. These bedrock mortars are remnants of food processing/grinding once used by the Miwok who lived in the area.

Irishtown is now a part of Pine Grove. Albert Leonard, Pine Grove's first postmaster, lived in the area in 1854, in an inn that he built. It served as a popular spot to visit for those traveling between Jackson and Clinton.
