= Big Bar (Amador County, California) =

Gold mine in California, United States

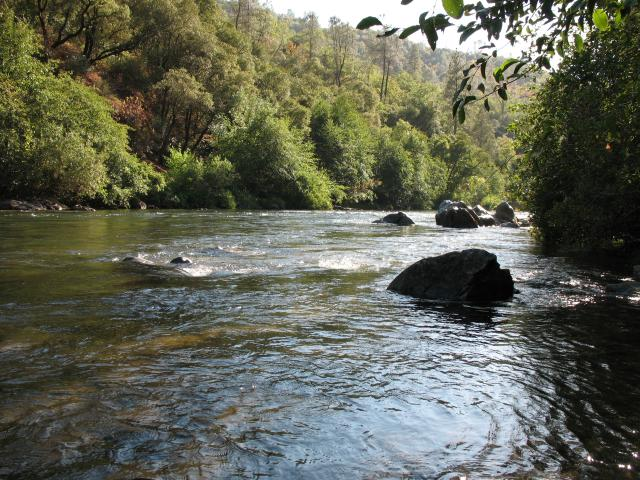
- Big Bar gold mines were on the Mokelumne River

- Location within California Location within the United States
- 38.311860°N 120.719930°W
- Location: Big Bar Road, Amador County, Jackson, California

California Historical Landmark
- Reference no.: 41

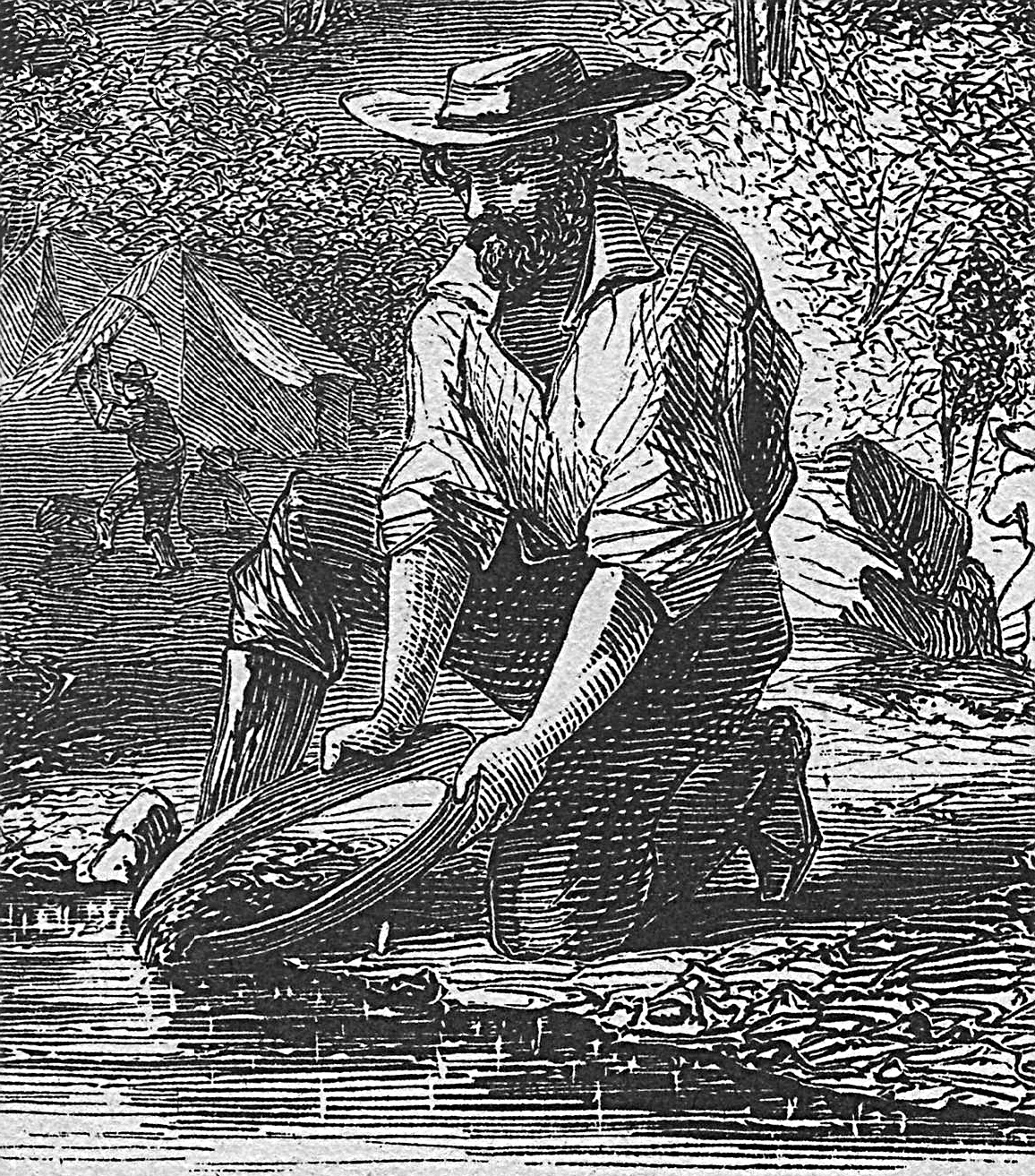
Panning for gold on the Mokelumne River

The Big Bar, also called Upper Bar, is a gold mine in Jackson, California, United States. The mine opened in 1848 along the Mokelumne River and is registered as California Historical Landmark #41.

The jackpot mine sprung up a town quickly for the prospectors and those who served them. An old inn is all that remains of the town. A Whaleboat ferry ran across the river from 1848 until 1852 when a new bridge was built by Soher & Parrish. A newer bridge is at the spot of the original bridge. In 1856, Dr. L. Soher opened a toll road, now called the Old Toll Road, from the city of Mokelumne Hill to the bridge. A 1862 flood washed away the Soher' bridge, so he opened a new ferry, till a new bridge was built. North of the site is the city of Butte City, Butte Store is a California Historical Landmark No. 39. The Big Bar site today is the Bureau of Land Management (BLM), Big Bar Launch Facility, on the Mokelumne River Whitewater Trail. While the Historical listing is in Amador County, the Big Bar site is also in Calaveras County across the river.

== See also ==
- California Historical Landmarks in Amador County
- California Historical Landmarks in Calaveras County
- Smith Mine disaster
- Saint Sava Serbian Orthodox Church (Jackson, California)
- Monongah mining disaster
