= Scully Ranch =

- U.S. National Register of Historic Places
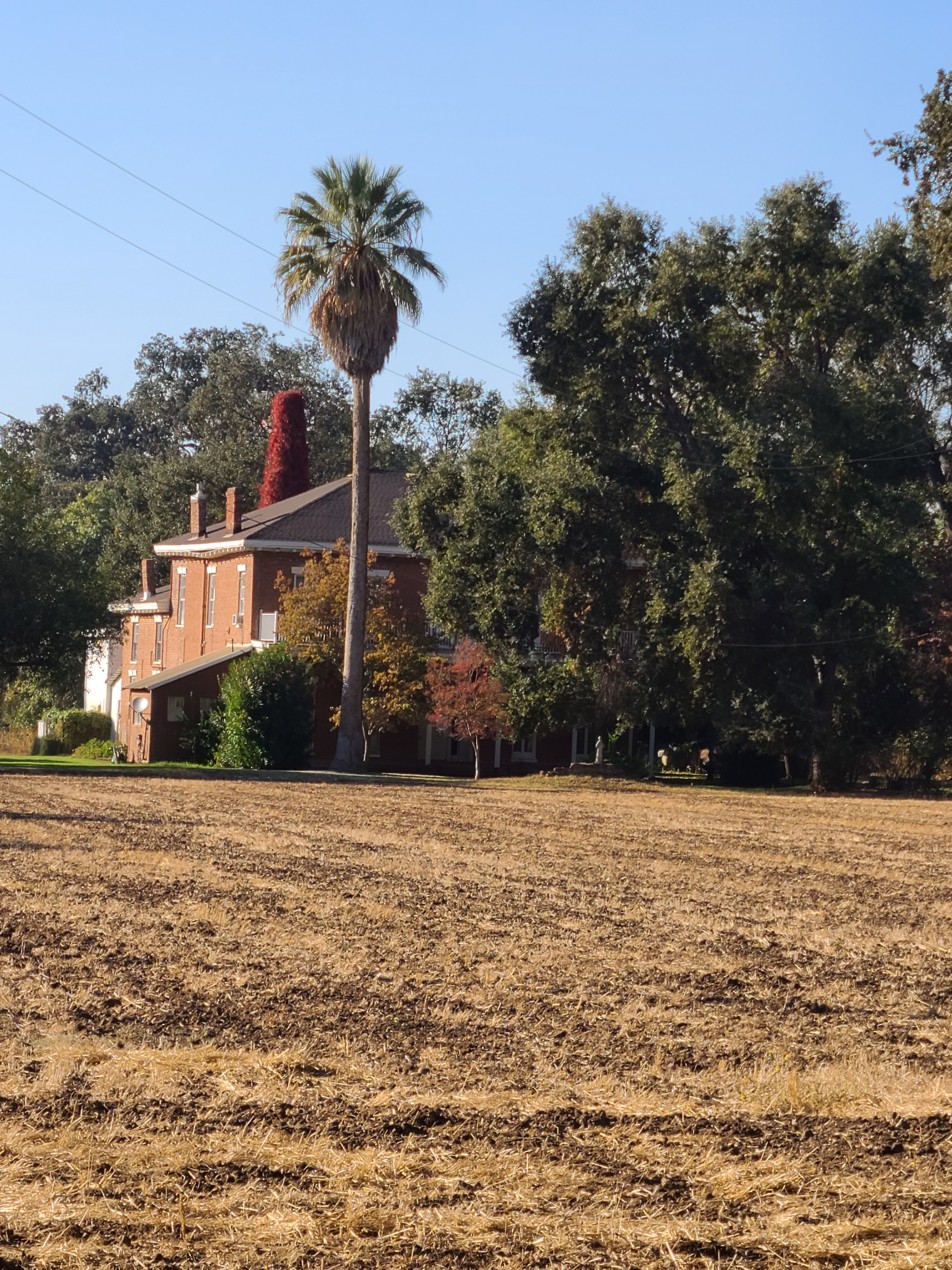

- Location within California
- Location: Marlette St., Ione, California
- Coordinates: 38°21′13″N 120°57′34″W
- Area: 7.4 acres (3.0 ha)
- Built: 1852
- Architectural style: Classical Revival
- NRHP reference No.: 78000656
- Added to NRHP: November 21, 1978

Scully Ranch, on Marlette Street (Five Mile Drive) in Ione, California, was listed on the National Register of Historic Places in 1978. The listing included five contributing buildings.

Architecture includes some elements of Classical Revival design.

The main building of the ranch is an L-shaped one with a medium hipped roof, four chimneys, and boxed cornices. It is about 40 by 49 feet (12 m × 15 m) in plan. There are open verandas; prior to c.1910 there was a roof over the east side veranda. It was built during 1852 to 1858.
