= Drytown, California =

- Census-designated place
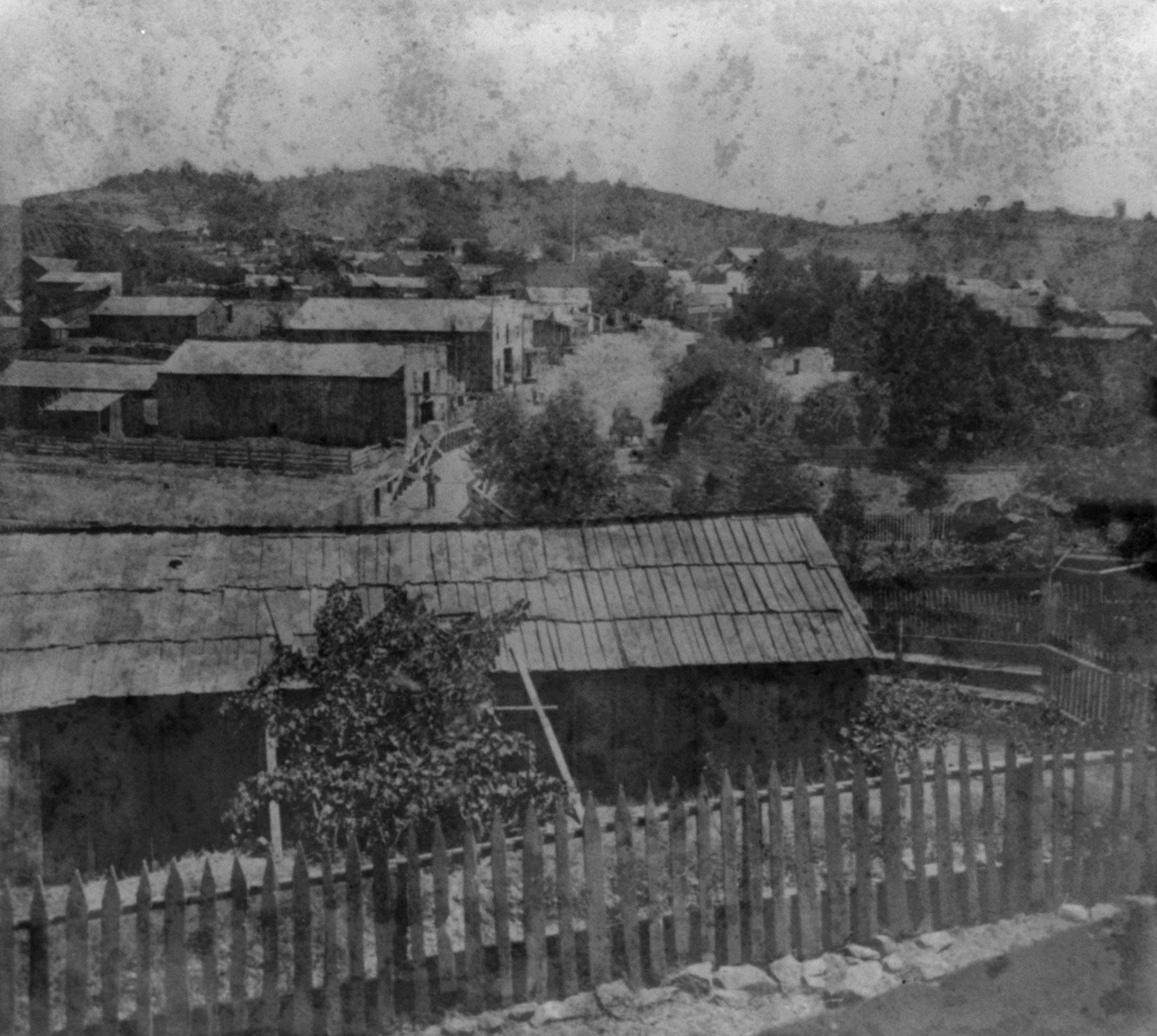
- Downtown Drytown, 1866

- Location of Drytown in Amador County, California.

- Location in California
- Coordinates: 38°26′28″N 120°51′16″W
- Country: United States
- State: California
- County: Amador

Area
  - Total: 3.26 sq mi (8.44 km^{2})
  - Land: 3.25 sq mi (8.43 km^{2})
  - Water: 0.0039 sq mi (0.01 km^{2}) 0%
- Elevation: 646 ft (197 m)

Population (2020)
  - Total: 186
  - Density: 57.1/sq mi (22.06/km^{2})
- ZIP Code: 95699
- Area code: 209
- GNIS feature ID: 1658441; 2583002

California Historical Landmark
- Reference no.: 31

Drytown (formerly, Dry Town) is a census-designated place in Amador County, California, United States. It is located 2.5 miles (4.0 km) south of Plymouth on Dry Creek, at an elevation of 646 feet (197 m). The population at the 2020 census was 186. The town is registered as a California Historical Landmark. The community is in ZIP code 95699 and area code 209. Today Drytown is home to a population of less than 200 people and about 5 antiques stores. But once before it was a well-known hotspot thanks to the gold mines with a population of 10,000 people.

== History ==
Drytown is the oldest community in Amador County, and the first in which gold was discovered. It took its name from Dry Creek, which runs dry during the summer. However, it was certainly not "dry", as stories tell of there being up to 26 saloons, of which just one remains, The Drytown Club.

The gold started to peter out by 1857 and when a fire destroyed most of the town that year, most of its inhabitants packed up and moved to more successful mines elsewhere in the county. The town was only saved by the construction of State Route 49, which went through it, in 1920. See the Drytown, CA website for additional history and current information.

A U.S. Post Office opened at Drytown in 1852. In the 1960s the post office was located within the Drytown General Store operated by the Bruns family. A visit in January 2010 revealed that the general store building is now occupied by an antique shop, the Drytown Post Office is housed in an adjacent, newer building which is also an antique shop, and the Drytown general store is now in a second separate, newer building nearby.

At the time of the January 2010 visit there was a sign on the door of the post office building stating that the post office was closed in April, 2009, and efforts were being made to reopen it.

From 1959 to about 1994 — before the Mother Lode boom — a summer theater company called the "Claypipers" staged comedic melodramas interspersed with "olio" (song and dance) acts. Musical accompaniment for both was provided by Dottie Rodgers on the piano. The name Claypipers was taken from the clay pipes used by miners in the deep tunnels of hard rock gold mines. After a successful summer in adjacent Amador City, the Claypipers bought the century-old building across Highway 49 from the Drytown General Store and remodeled it into a theater with table seating, a bar, stage, wings and a sophisticated stage lighting system. The basement was converted to dressing rooms and green room, and a stairway added from there to the stage wings. The majority of the cast, crew and spectators traveled from communities around San Francisco Bay to this Mother Lode area on show days to be a part of this phenomenon. The large "Piper's Playhouse" marquee was a familiar sight to anyone traveling this part of Highway 49 during the Claypipers' tenure.

The Claypipers also purchased the house across Spanish Street from the theater, constructed a "dorm" addition, and used it as a base of operations on show days and work days.

Following a fire in 1985, the theater was completely re-built and a second story was added to the Piper Playhouse. The Claypipers continued performing melodramas until closing their doors for good in 1994. The house on Spanish Street was sold a few years later, and the theater was ultimately sold in 2010.

In the early 1960s, the Claypipers purchased a "fire engine" for Drytown — a well used but serviceable Red Ford 1-Ton pickup truck with built-in 400 gallon water tank and pump — and constructed a "fire station" (garage) building to house it on the west side of the 'T' intersection of Spanish St and New Chicago Road. In 1963, the 3 man volunteer Drytown Fire Department was called out three times, and saved two of the three homes involved. The third was fully engulfed in flames before the call came in, but they were able to prevent the adjacent propane tank from erupting as well as the spread of the fire to the very dry surrounding grassy fields. In January 2010, the "fire engine" was nowhere to be found, and the "fire Station' building had been fitted with man-doors and had a 'For Rent' sign on it.

== Demographics ==
Historical population
Census	Pop.	Note	%±
2010	167		—
2020	186		11.4%
U.S. Decennial Census; 2010

Drytown first appeared as a census designated place in the 2010 U.S. census.

The 2020 United States census reported that Drytown had a population of 186. The population density was 57.1 inhabitants per square mile (22.0/km^{2}). The racial makeup of Drytown was 84.4% White, 0.0% African American, 1.1% Native American, 0.5% Asian, 1.1% Pacific Islander, 4.3% from other races, and 8.6% from two or more races. Hispanic or Latino of any race were 5.4% of the population.

There were 90 households, out of which 26.7% included children under the age of 18, 45.6% were married-couple households, 4.4% were cohabiting couple households, 31.1% had a female householder with no partner present, and 18.9% had a male householder with no partner present. 33.3% of households were one person, and 14.4% were one person aged 65 or older. The average household size was 2.07. There were 52 families (57.8% of all households).

The age distribution was 11.8% under the age of 18, 5.9% aged 18 to 24, 25.3% aged 25 to 44, 23.7% aged 45 to 64, and 33.3% who were 65 years of age or older. The median age was 51.5 years. There were 98 males and 88 females.

There were 101 housing units at an average density of 31.0 units per square mile (12.0 units/km^{2}), of which 90 (89.1%) were occupied. Of these, 63.3% were owner-occupied, and 36.7% were occupied by renters.

== Politics ==
In the state legislature, Drytown is in the 4th senatorial district, represented by Republican Marie Alvarado-Gil, and the 1st Assembly district, represented by Republican Heather Hadwick. Federally, Drytown is in California's 5th congressional district, represented by Republican Tom McClintock.
