= Eliza Withington =

American photographer (1825–1877)

Elizabeth Withington
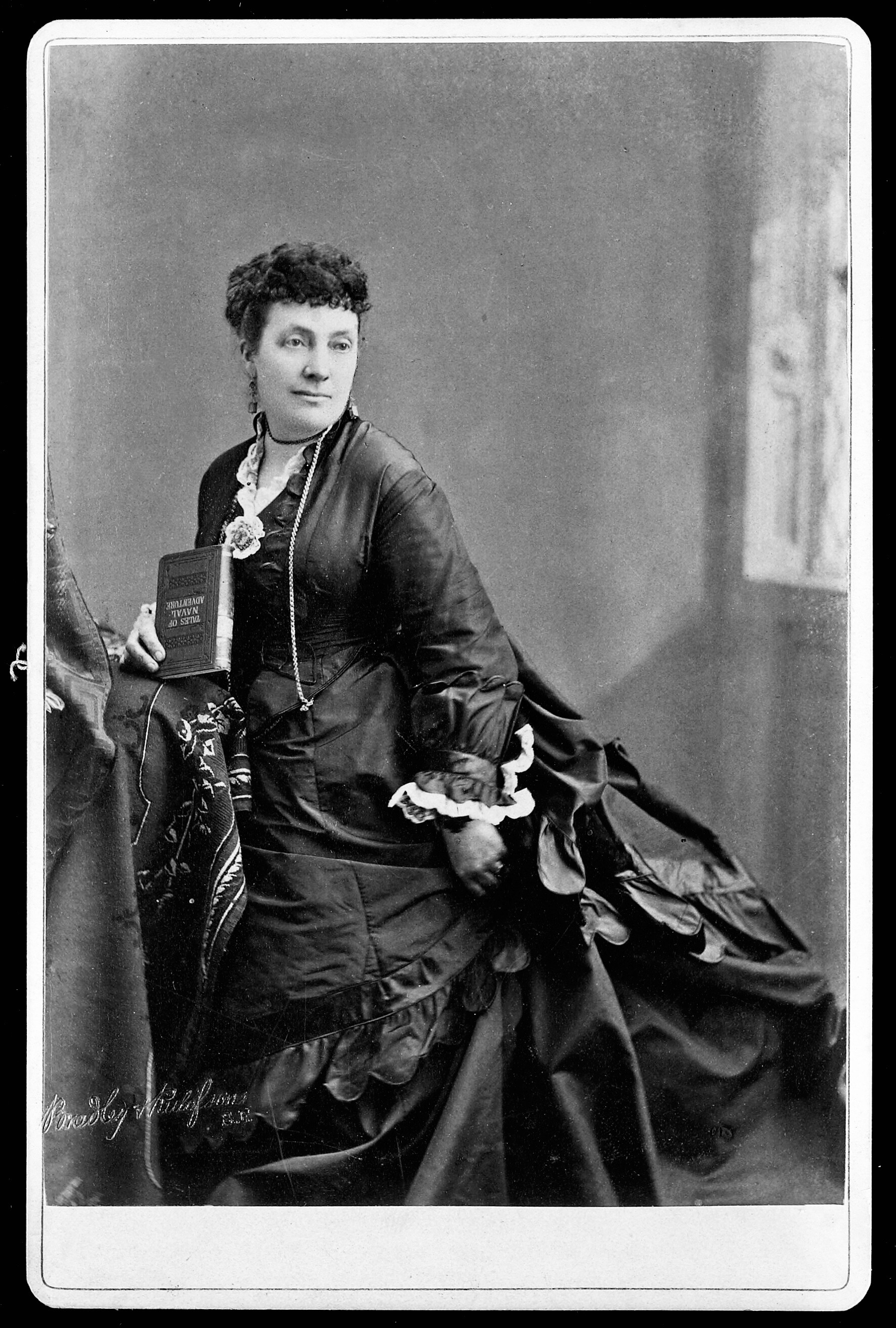
- Born: Elizabeth W. Kirby; 1825; New York City, New York
- Died: 1877 (aged 51–52); Ione, California
- Occupation: Photographer

Elizabeth "Eliza" Kirby Withington (1825–1877) was an American portrait and landscape photographer.

== Early life and family ==
Elizabeth W. Kirby was born in 1825 in New York City. She married the shingle maker George V. Withington in Monroe, Michigan, in 1845. They had three children.

== Life in California ==
George traveled west as part of the California Gold Rush in 1849. He eventually moved to the mining supply town of Ione. Eliza and the children joined him in 1852. She returned to New York in 1856 to learn photography. She visited various galleries, including that of Mathew Brady.

Upon her return to Ione City, she established the Excelsior Ambrotype Gallery on Main Street, offering ambrotypes at the skylit studio. In addition to photography, Withington ran a school for ladies where she taught classes in leather crafting, embroidery, and "Oriental pearl painting", then a tinsel painting fad, typically flowers, on glass.

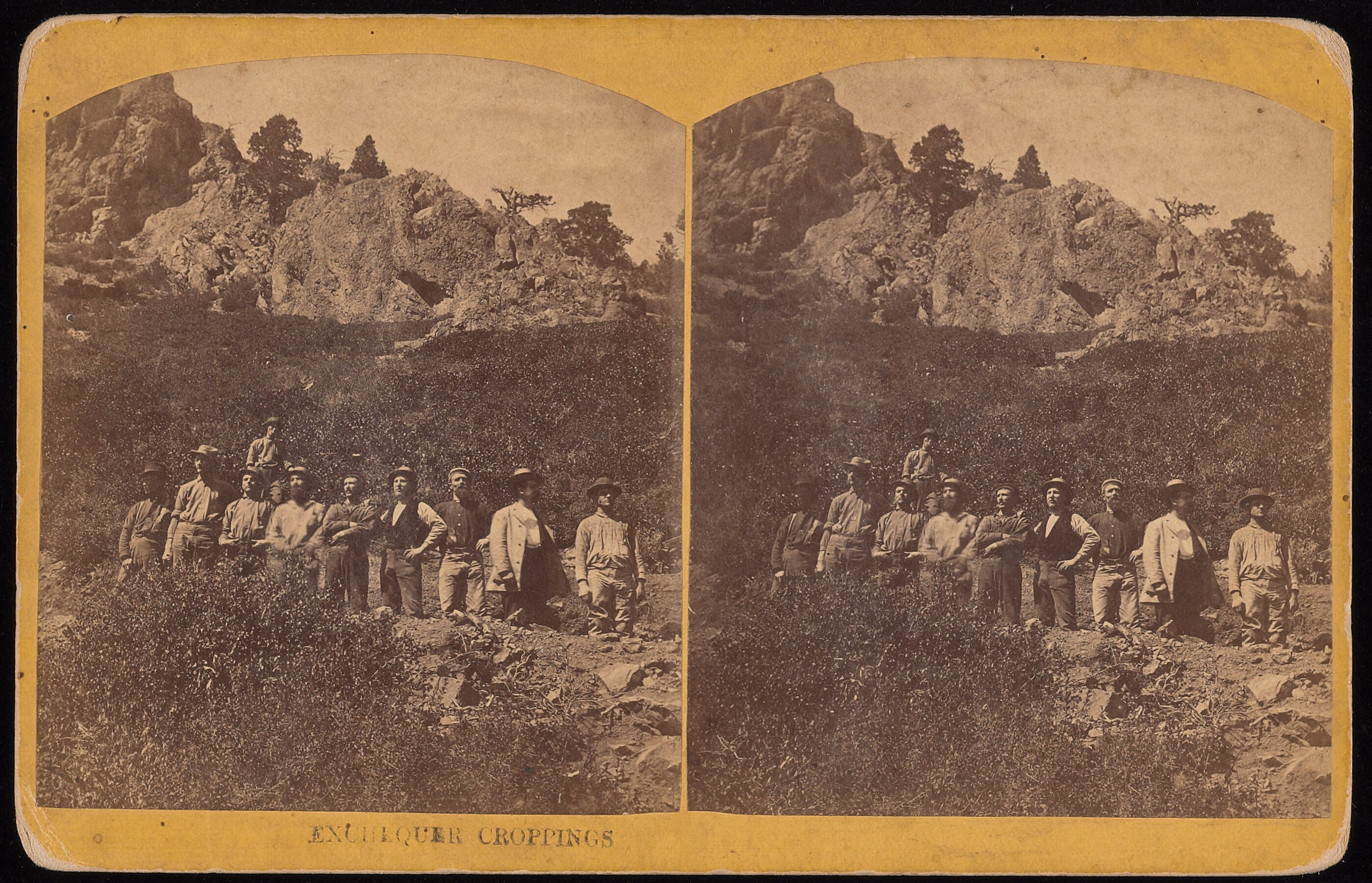
Exchequer croppings by Withington

Withington did business as a portrait photographer. She photographed scenery and settlements in the Sierra Nevada. Among her photographs were stereoviews of a family camp in the mountains and Kirkwood Dairy in Kirkwood.

Withington devised a dark tent using heavy dresses and a parasol made with black linen that doubled as a walking stick. She hitched rides on passing fruit carts and took stagecoaches, equipped with photographic supplies. She took trips to mining camps, taking photographs of the mining families. Her photographs also depicted landscapes of the Sierra Nevada mountains, including those that she took near Silver Lake, California, in 1873. Around 1875, she and her husband lived at the Grant House. One of her photographs depicts children playing croquet at the house.

In 1875, Withington joined the San Francisco Photographic Art Society of the Pacific. She published the article "How a Woman Makes Landscape Photographs," in the Philadelphia Photographer in 1876. Withington died of cancer in Ione in 1877.
