= Stockton and Ione Railroad =

Stockton & Ione Railroad
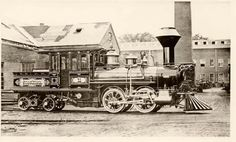
- Builder's photograph of Stockton & Ione Railroad Locomotive No 1 Stockton at the Mason Locomotive Factory in 1875

Technical
- Line length: 40 miles (64.4 km)
- Track gauge: 3 ft (914 mm)

The Stockton & Ione Railroad was from 1873 to 1876 a 40 miles (64.4 km) long narrow gauge railroad in California.

== History ==
The Stockton & Ione Railroad Company was incorporated in 1873 to construct a narrow gauge railway from Stockton, California northwestward via Linden, California to Ione City in Amador county, covering a distance of 40 miles (64.4 km) miles.

Grading was commenced in 1874, but financial difficulties prevented the laying of track till 1875, when 18 miles were ironed. The maximum grade was 53 feet to the mile (1.0 %). The weight of rail was 40 pounds per yard (20 kg/m).

== Weblinks and further literature ==
- Andrew Brandon: Stockton & Ione Railroad.
- Stockton and Copperopolis Railroad Company: Prospectus of the Stockton & Copperopolis Railroad Company, and Stockton and Ione City Railroad. 1870.
- California - Legislature - Senate: Journals of the Senate and Assembly California Legislature. 1878. Page 110.
