= D. Stewart Company Store =

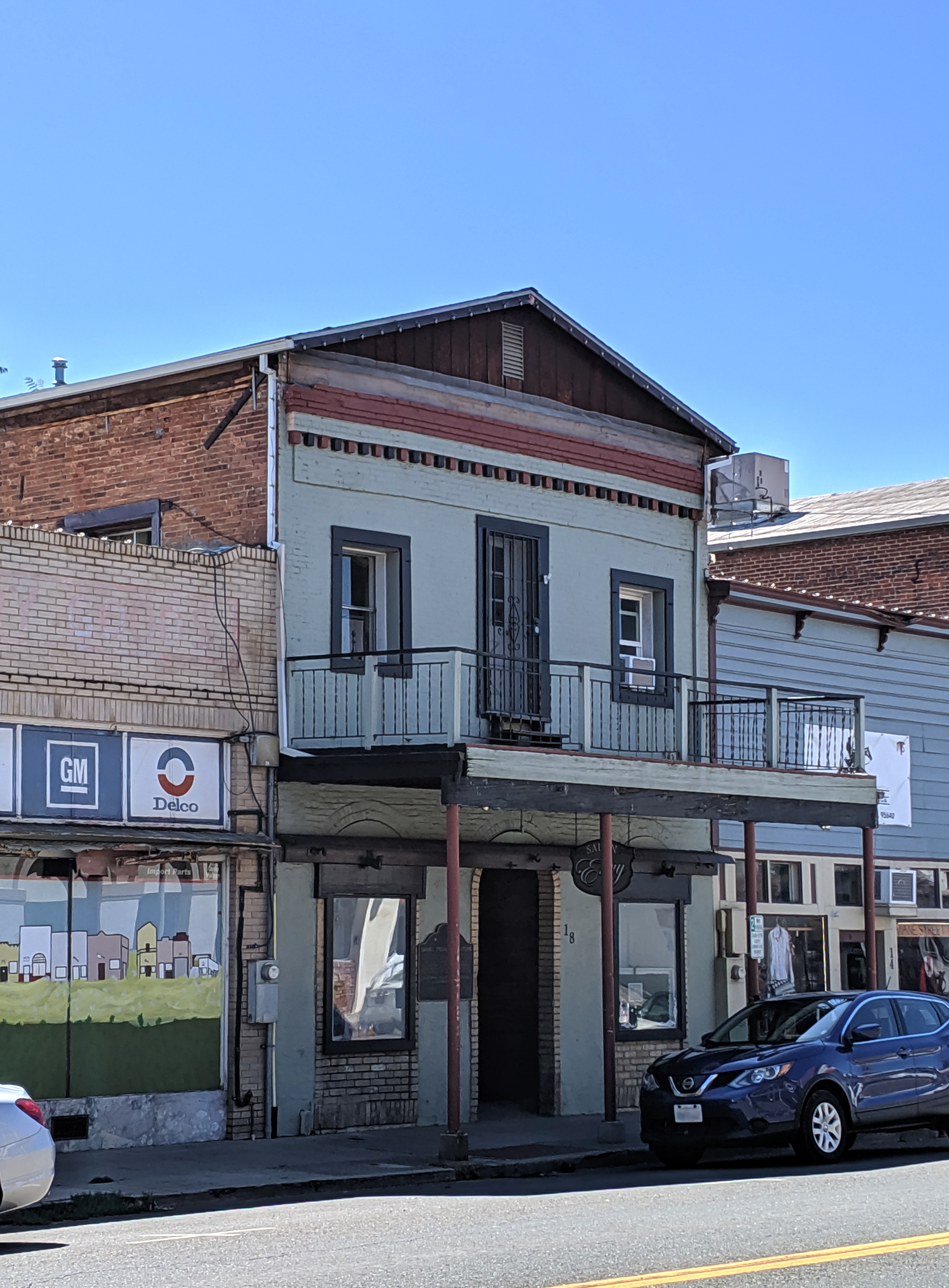
- The Daniel Stewart Company Store in 2019
- Location: 18 E Main St., Ione, California
- Coordinates: 38.352828°N 120.933001°W
- Built: 1856
- Architect: Daniel Stewart

California Historical Landmark
- Designated: November 21, 1963
- Reference no.: 788

D. Stewart Company Store was the first brick building in Ione, California, United States. It was a general store. It opened in 1856. It's listed as a California Historical Landmark.

== History ==
Daniel Stewart founded the company in 1856 in Ione. He built it with his brother out of bricks made in Muletown, California. It was one of 50 buildings in Ione. The company was active in service organizations. They sponsored the building of a new school. The family lived in Ione and ran the store for many years.
