= Amador County Hospital Building =

Historic Building in California, United States

- U.S. National Register of Historic Places
- California Historical Landmark
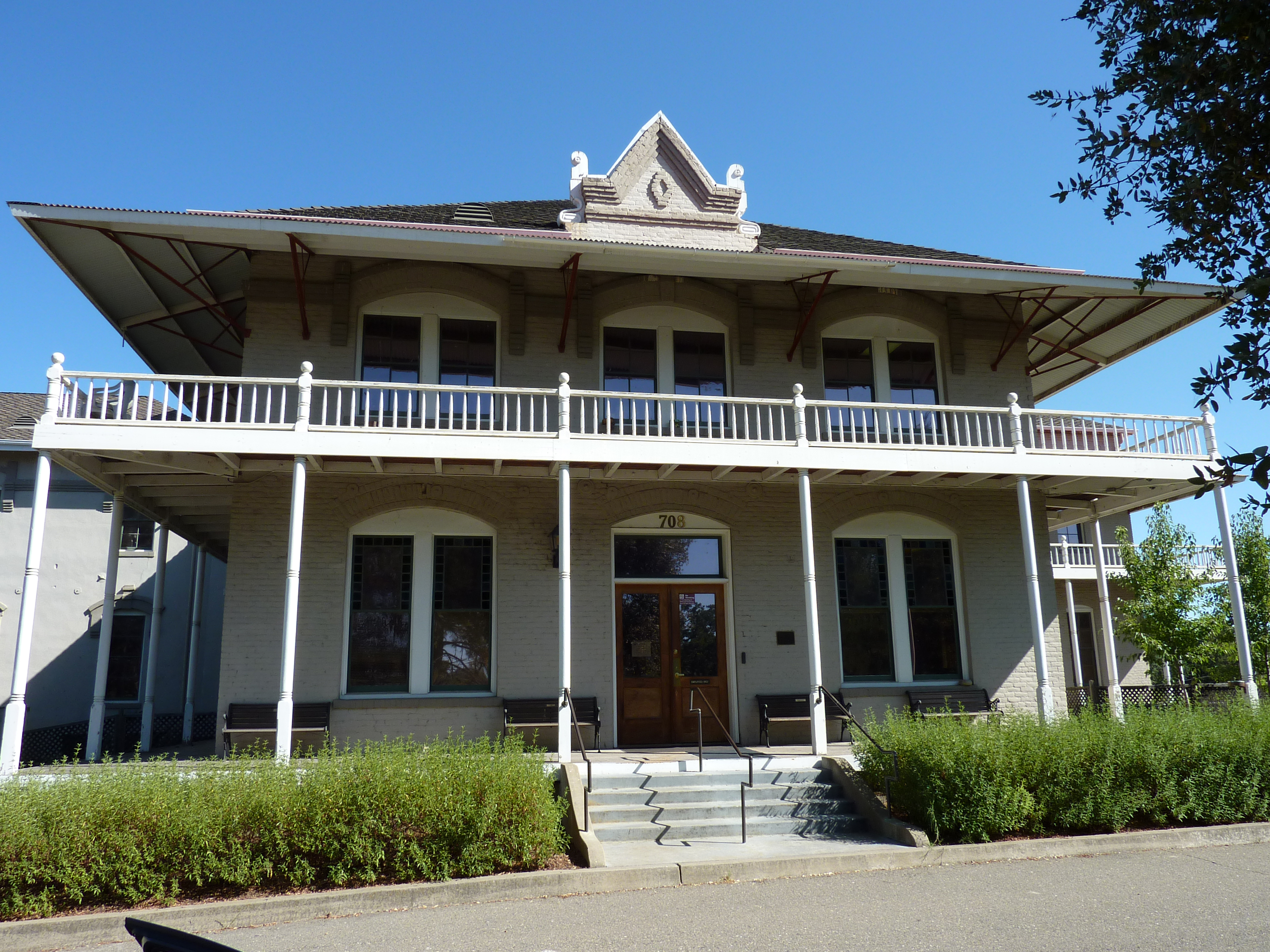

- Location within California Location within the United States
- Location: 708 Court St., Jackson, California
- Coordinates: 38°21′0″N 120°55′58″W
- Built: 1890–1890; 136 years ago
- NRHP reference No.: 72000215
- Added to NRHP: February 23, 1972

The Amador County Hospital Building, also known as the Old Hospital Building, is a historical hospital located in Jackson, California, United States.

== History ==
Plans for construction of a new hospital in Amador County began in 1887 in response to the growing population around the foothills area. The contract to build the hospital was awarded to C.W Swain and C. E. Fournier. The hospital was completed and opened in 1890.

Talks for building an additional annex began in March 1901. The contract to build the annex was awarded to Lincoln Vandament. The annex was finished in November 1901.

The hospital was added to the National Register of Historic Places on February 23, 1972.

As of 2025, the hospital houses several government agencies.
