= Pine Grove, Amador County, California =

Pine Grove
- census-designated place
- Location in California
- Coordinates: 38°24′47″N 120°39′32″W
- Country: United States
- State: California
- County: Amador

Area
  - Total: 7.484 sq mi (19.383 km^{2})
  - Land: 7.484 sq mi (19.383 km^{2})
  - Water: 0 sq mi (0 km^{2}) 0%
- Elevation: 2,513 ft (766 m)

Population (2020)
  - Total: 2,891
  - Density: 386.3/sq mi (149.2/km^{2})
- ZIP Code: 95665
- Area code: 209
- GNIS feature ID: 1659391; 2583114

Pine Grove is a census-designated place in Amador County, California, United States. It lies at an elevation of 2513 feet (766 m). The population was 2,891 at the 2020 census.

The current boundaries of Pine Grove include the former mining towns of Clinton and Irishtown. The town also is home to Indian Grinding Rock State Historic Park.

A post office opened in Pine Grove in 1856.

== Demographics ==
Historical population
Census	Pop.	Note	%±
2010	2,219		—
2020	2,891		30.3%
U.S. Decennial Census; 2010

Pine Grove first appeared as a census designated place in the 2010 U.S. census.

The 2020 United States census reported that Pine Grove had a population of 2,891. The population density was 386.3 inhabitants per square mile (149.2/km^{2}). The racial makeup of Pine Grove was 84.1% White, 0.6% African American, 1.7% Native American, 1.1% Asian, 0.4% Pacific Islander, 2.8% from other races, and 9.2% from two or more races. Hispanic or Latino of any race were 9.9% of the population.

The Census reported that 99.6% of the population lived in households, 0.4% lived in non-institutionalized group quarters, and none were institutionalized.

There were 1,274 households, out of which 16.8% included children under the age of 18, 53.7% were married-couple households, 5.3% were cohabiting couple households, 20.6% had a female householder with no partner present, and 20.4% had a male householder with no partner present. 29.4% of households were one person, and 18.1% were one person aged 65 or older. The average household size was 2.26. There were 825 families (64.8% of all households).

The age distribution was 15.6% under the age of 18, 4.7% aged 18 to 24, 18.3% aged 25 to 44, 30.3% aged 45 to 64, and 31.2% who were 65 years of age or older. The median age was 55.7 years. For every 100 females, there were 104.0 males.

There were 1,432 housing units at an average density of 191.3 units per square mile (73.9 units/km^{2}), of which 1,274 (89.0%) were occupied. Of these, 83.9% were owner-occupied, and 16.1% were occupied by renters.

== Politics ==
In the state legislature, Pine Grove is in the 4th senatorial district, represented by Republican Marie Alvarado-Gil, and the 1st Assembly district, represented by Republican Heather Hadwick. Federally, Pine Grove is in California's 5th congressional district, represented by Republican Tom McClintock.
