= William J. Paugh House =

Historic house in California, United States

- U.S. National Register of Historic Places
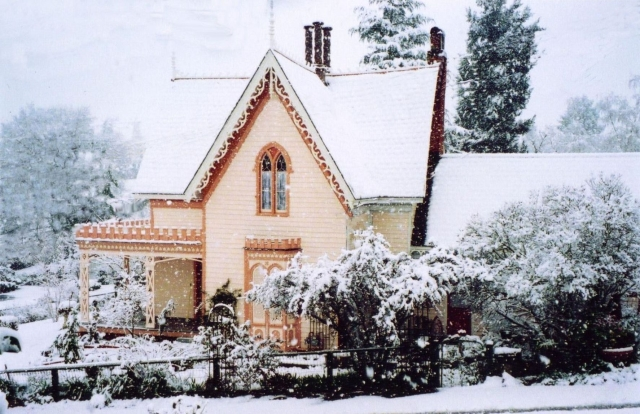
- Rosewall in the snow (click to enlarge)

- Location within California Location within the United States
- Nearest city: Jackson, California
- Coordinates: 38°21′5″N 120°46′14″W
- Built: ca. 1859
- Architect: Parish, Charles Louis
- Architectural style: Carpenter Gothic-Gothic Revival
- NRHP reference No.: 07000507

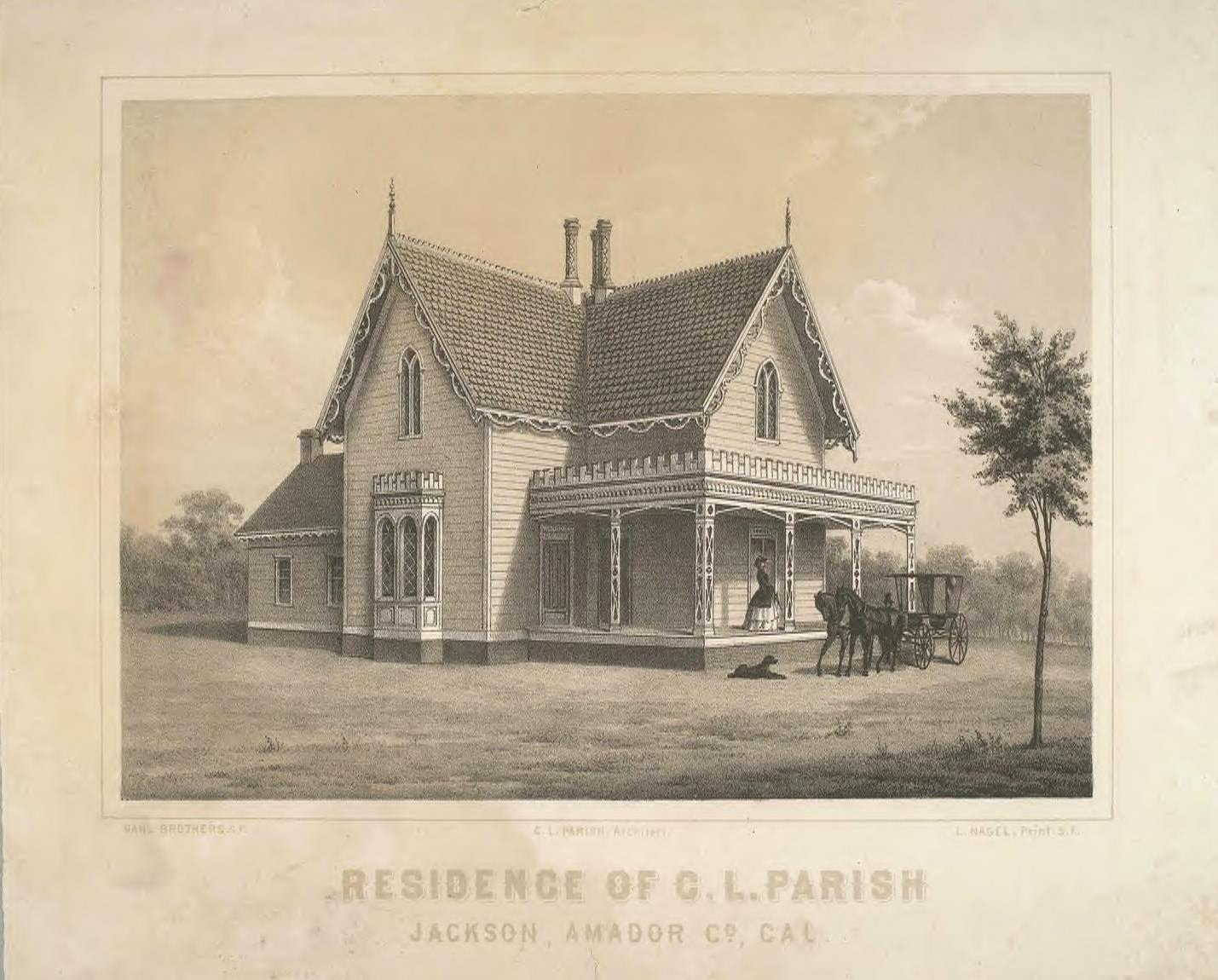
Nahl Bros. Drawing, 1850s, captioned: Residence of C.L. Parish, Jackson, Amador Co. Cal. (click to enlarge)

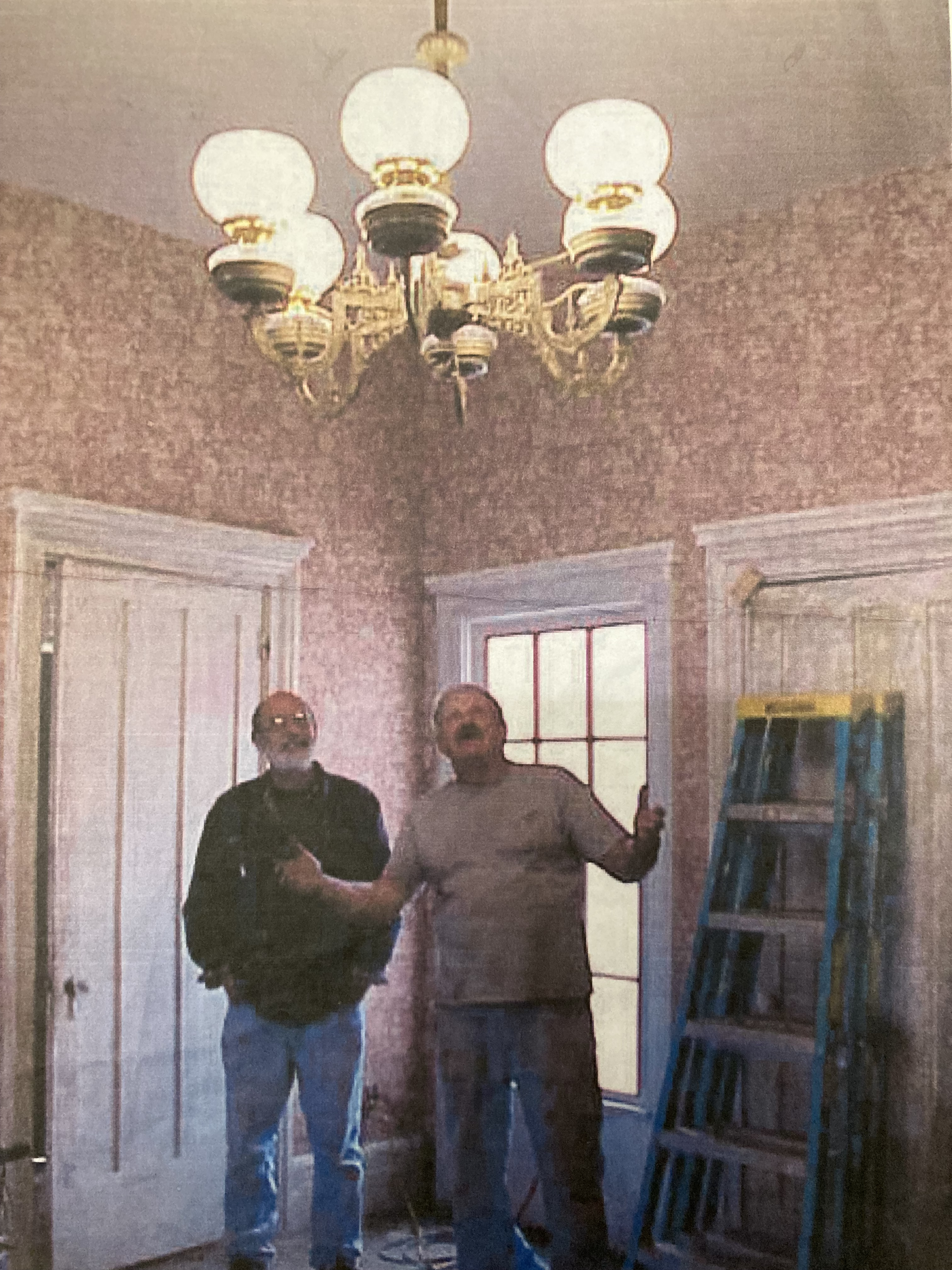
Owner Jerry Chaix and Fredric Moody admiring the installation of a new chandelier during the restoration.

The William J. Paugh House, also known as Rosewall, is a very pure example of a Carpenter Gothic - Gothic Revival house, one of a very few in Northern California. It is located in Jackson, California, in Amador County. It was built in the late 1850s by Charles L. Parish, artist, architect and builder.

According to Parish family lore, it was built to impress a school teacher that Charles was in love with, in order to persuade her to marry him. When his intended bride was tragically killed in a "runaway accident", he raffled the house off, charging one dollar a ticket. He called the raffle "The Charles L. Parish Gift and Musical Entertainment Raffle". He sold 8,650 tickets around the state in 1860 and 1861. Advertisements appeared in the Amador Ledger-Dispatch and the Sacramento Daily Union.

The house was won in 1861 by Amador County's second Sheriff, Dr. William J. Paugh, who lived there until 1870, when he moved to San Francisco to practice medicine as a physician/surgeon. It was sold at that time to George Snowden Andrews, Jackson Wells Fargo agent from 1857 until 1875.

In 1884 the owner of the house, Superior Court judge George Moore, was shot and killed in the sitting room. A reward was offered by the governor of the state in hopes of apprehending the assassin.

In 1918 Susan Hocking, who owned the house with her husband Tobias T. Hocking, died from the Spanish flu, the worst pandemic in human history. She is buried in the Jackson City cemetery.

In 1940 the house was purchased by Walter and Margaret Voss. Walter died in 1958. Margaret, an educated and strong willed woman, lived there until her death in 2001 at 102 years of age, having lived in three centuries.

The house was purchased by Jerry and Jeanette Chaix in 2001 and completely restored during the years 2002–2006. It was placed on The National Register of Historic Places in 2007.

The restoration of the William J. Paugh House was completed by Fredric Lee Moody, a skilled craftsman hired by owners Jerry and Jeanette Chaix. Moody undertook the project single-handedly, meticulously restoring the home’s structure and intricate woodwork to honor its original 19th-century craftsmanship.
