= Butte City, Amador County, California =

Unincorporated community in California, United States

Butte City (Amador County)
- Unincorporated community
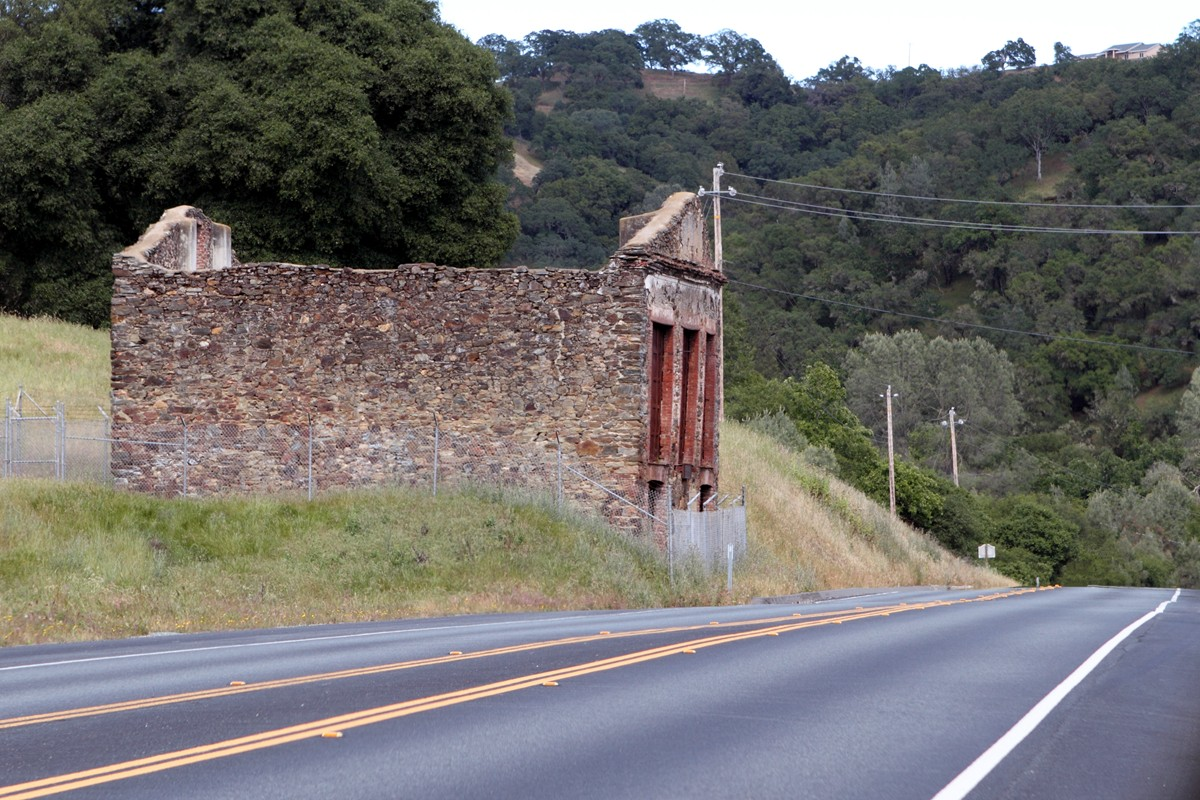
- Butte Store, 2012

- Location in California Butte City (Amador County) (the United States)
- Coordinates: 38°19′33″N 120°44′7″W
- Country: United States
- State: California
- County: Amador
- Elevation: 1,037 ft (316 m)

The Butte Store is the only structure out of 100 still standing of the original mining town of Butte City. It was built in 1857 by Enrico Bruni, an Italian stonemason, out of brick and fieldstone from Calaveras. It also has three doors made of iron. Xavier Benoist used it as a store and bakery. The building has also served as a post office and a general store called Ginocchio's. The Ginnochio family owned it for 50 years until its closure in the 1900s. It is now a California Historical Landmark.

== See also ==
- Big Bar
