= Kirkwood Inn & Saloon =

- Location in California
- 38.702683°N 120.072417°W
- Location: State Route 88, Kirkwood, California

History
- Built: 1864

Site notes
- Architect: Zachary Kirkwood
- Architectural style: Log cabin

California Historical Landmark
- Reference no.: 40

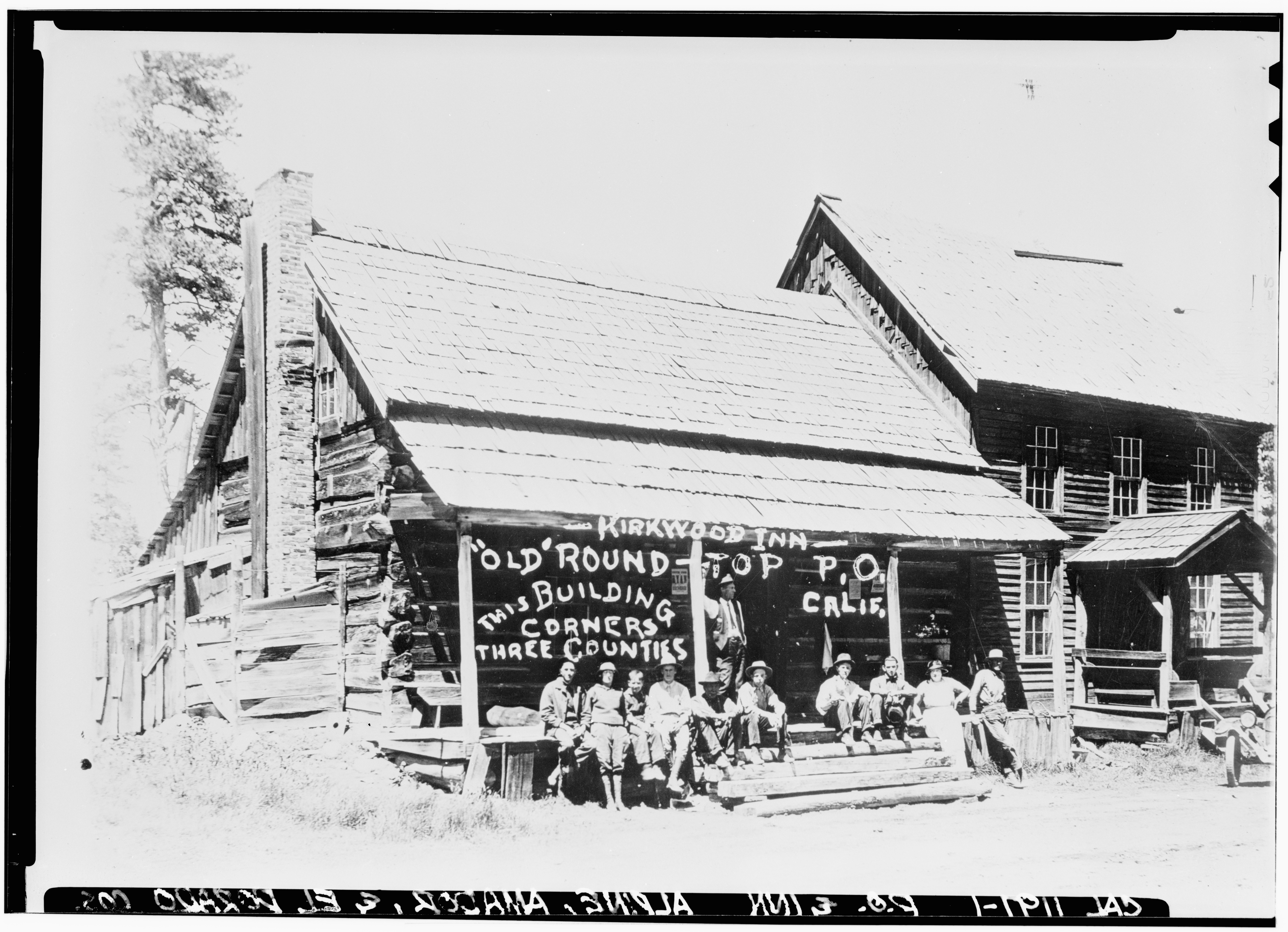

The Kirkwood Inn & Saloon (also known as Kirkwood Station or Kirkwood's) is a restaurant and bar located in Kirkwood, California, United States. It's situated at the intersection of three county lines: Alpine, Amador, and El Dorado counties, at 7,800 feet (2,400 m) up. It was built in 1864 and is a California Historical Landmark.

== History ==
In 1860, pioneer Zachary Kirkwood moved to the area from Ohio. He acquired three 160-acre (65 ha) parcels of land. He used this land for a cattle ranch. In 1864 he built and opened Kirkwood Station. It served as an inn, post office, and a restaurant. Its convenient location, where three county lines meet, made it a popular stop for cattle ranchers and passing Washoe. When Prohibition took place, the inn had a bar on wheels that they would move across the different county lines that met in the bar depending on which members of law enforcement from certain counties were visiting. It is also believed they did this to avoid paying tax collectors their cut of liquor receipts. They also had slot machines hidden in the kitchen.

In the 1960s, when the founders of the Kirkwood Mountain Resort came to visit the area, a snow storm took place. The entire inn was buried under the snowfall. The founders had arrived with a team for a snow survey. They used the survey poles to find the top of the Inn. After locating the structure, they were able to access the inside of the Inn. They lived in the buried building for eight days.

== Today ==
The Kirkwood Inn is still a functioning restaurant and bar. It is owned by the Kirkwood Mountain Resort. It's an eco-friendly establishment; all of its food packaging is biodegradable or recyclable. They use all natural cleaning products, LED lighting and recycle their cooking oil into biodiesel.

== Architecture ==
It is a log cabin. Today, it has a painted wooden sign out front, keeping with the traditional look and feel of the rustic architecture. The bar is made of mahogany. It also has a stone fireplace and furniture made of timber. The stone fireplace now contains a gas fireplace insert. The doorway is smaller than today's doors. Skiing described it as looking like "something straight out of F-Troop."
