= Bath, California =

Bath
- Former settlement
- Location in California
- Coordinates: 39°02′10″N 120°47′36″W
- Country: United States
- State: California
- County: Placer County
- Elevation: 3,442 ft (1,049 m)

Bath (formerly Volcano and Sarahsville) is a former settlement in Placer County, California. Bath is located 1.5 miles (2.4 km) northeast of Foresthill. It lay at an elevation of 3442 feet (1049 m).

The town was established as Volcano in 1850 when gold was discovered there. The town's name was changed to Sarahsville after the first woman at the site, then to Bath when the post office came. The Bath post office operated from 1858 to 1859, from 1861 to 1890, and from 1891 to 1899.
