= Community Methodist Church of Ione =

Historic church in California, United States

- U.S. National Register of Historic Places
- California Historical Landmark
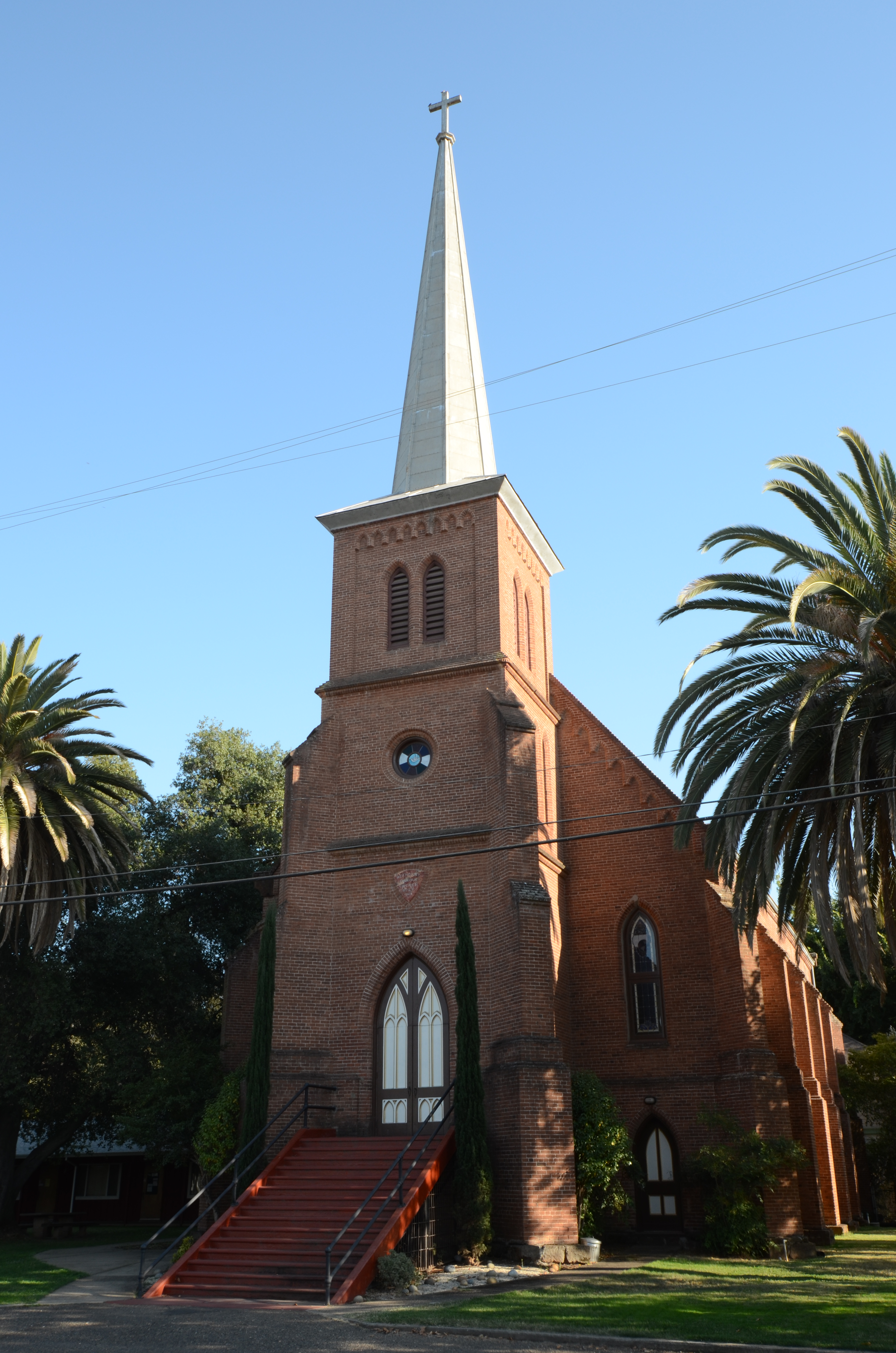

- Location within California Location within the United States
- Location: 150 W. Marlette St., Ione, California
- Coordinates: 38°21′0″N 120°55′58″W
- Area: less than one acre
- Built: 1862–1866; 160 years ago
- Architect: Mandell, Samuel D.
- Architectural style: Gothic Revival
- NRHP reference No.: 77000287
- CHISL No.: 506
- Added to NRHP: May 26, 1977

The Community Methodist Church of Ione, is a United Methodist church in Ione, California, United States. The church is registered as a California Historical Landmark and is listed on the National Register of Historic Places.

== History ==
The church was founded in 1861 with $8,000 being set aside for its building. Construction started on July 4, 1862. When the church was dedicated in 1866, it was called the "Ione City Centenary Church." Eventually it was called "Cathedral of the Mother Lode."

== Architecture ==
The church is made of brick. It consists of 255,000 bricks which were locally fired. It has a high roof with rafters that are visible. The roof and rafters do not use any bolts.
