= Indian Grinding Rock State Historic Park =

Archaeological site in Amador county, California

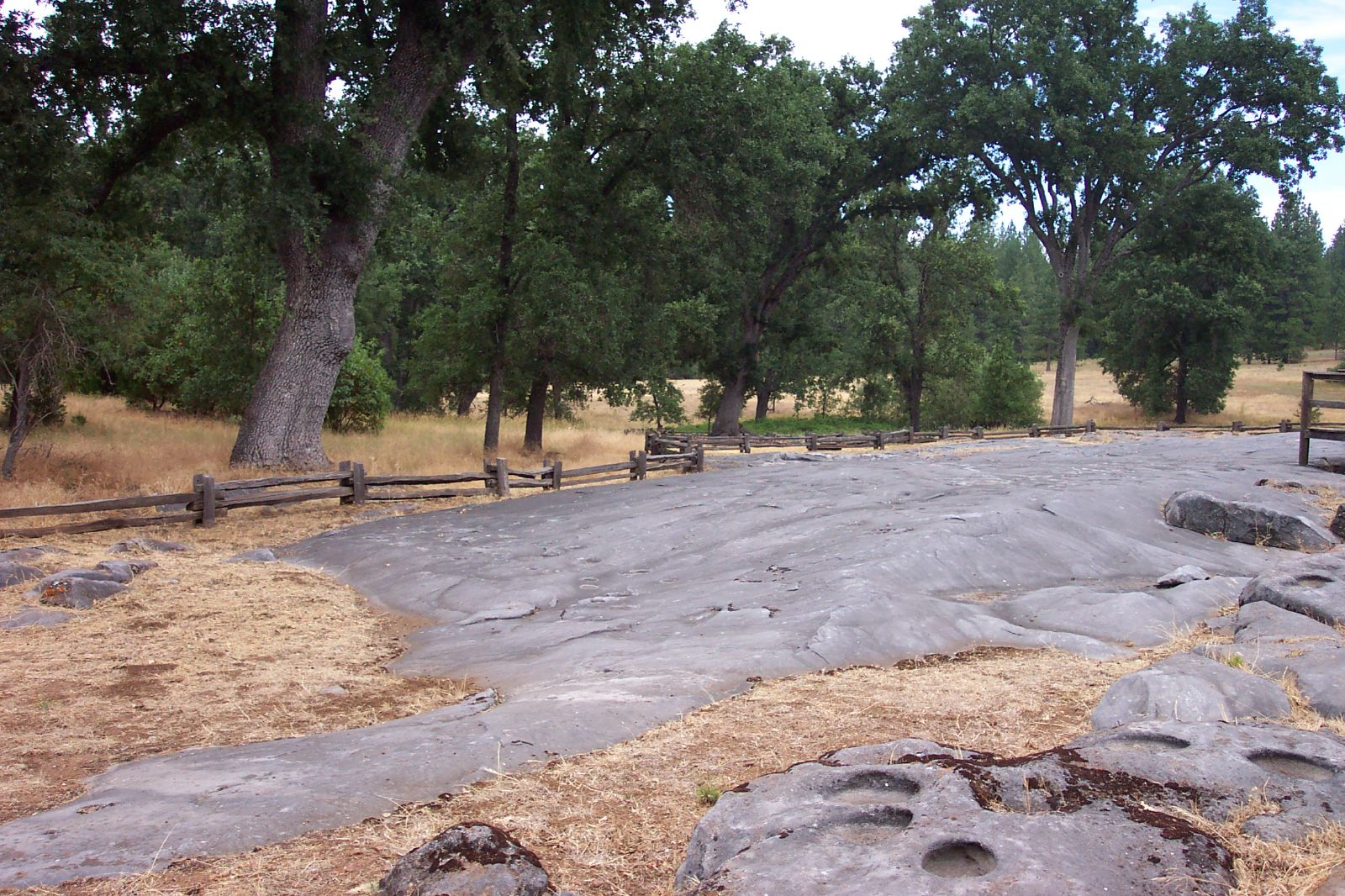
- Rock outcrop with mortar holes

- Location within California Location within the United States
- Location: Amador County, California
- Nearest city: Pine Grove, California
- Coordinates: 38°25′27″N 120°38′36″W
- Area: 135 acres (55 ha)
- Established: 1962
- Governing body: California Department of Parks and Recreation
- Indian Grinding Rock
- U.S. National Register of Historic Places
- Area: 264 acres (106.8 ha)
- NRHP reference No.: 71000133
- Added to NRHP: May 06, 1971

Indian Grinding Rock State Historic Park is a California State Park, preserving an outcropping of marbleized limestone with some 1,185 mortar holes—the largest collection of bedrock mortars in North America. It is located in the Sierra Nevada foothills, about 9 miles (14 km) northeast of Jackson. The park is nestled in a little valley 2,400 feet (732 m) above sea level, with open meadows and large specimens of valley oak that once provided the Miwok peoples of this area with an ample supply of acorns. The 135-acre (55 ha) park was established in 1962 and listed on the National Register of Historic Places in 1971.

The native name for the site is "Chaw’se", the Miwok word for "grinding rock". Upon this rock they ground acorns and other seeds into meal, slowly forming the cup-shaped depressions in the stone, which can still be seen today. Along with the mortar holes, the main grinding rock within the park features a number of petroglyphs: circles, spoked wheels, animal and human tracks, wavy lines, etc. Some of these carvings are thought to be as much as two or three thousand years old and are now becoming difficult to discern. This association of rock art and bedrock mortar pits is unique in California. Except for one other small site, Chaw'se has the only known occurrence of mortars intentionally decorated with petroglyphs.

== Chaw'se Regional Indian Museum ==
This museum within the park grounds features a variety of exhibits and a vast collection of Sierra Nevada Indian artifacts. A Miwok village complete with a ceremonial roundhouse has been reconstructed in the middle of the small valley and is registered as California Historical Landmark #1001. The museum has been designed to reflect the architecture of the traditional roundhouse. Exhibited in this two-story museum are examples of the technology and crafts of the Miwok and other Sierra Nevada Native American groups. As a regional Indian museum, the collection at Chaw'se includes exhibits on various tribal groups, including: the Northern, Central and Southern Miwok, Maidu, Konkow, Monache, Nisenan, Tubatulabal, Washoe, and Foothill Yokuts.

== Wildlife ==
Bird life varies depending on the season, but many species are seen year-round, including turkey vultures, California scrub and Steller's jays, California quail, acorn and hairy woodpeckers, northern flickers, hermit thrushes, wild turkeys (non-native), and California thrashers. In summer the bright colors of the western tanager, northern oriole, calliope and Anna's hummingbirds can be seen in the woods around the meadow.

The abundant animal life in and around the park includes deer, fox, gray and California ground squirrels, black-tailed jackrabbits, bobcats, bats, and occasionally a mountain lion or black bear. Coyote calls can be heard on quiet summer nights.

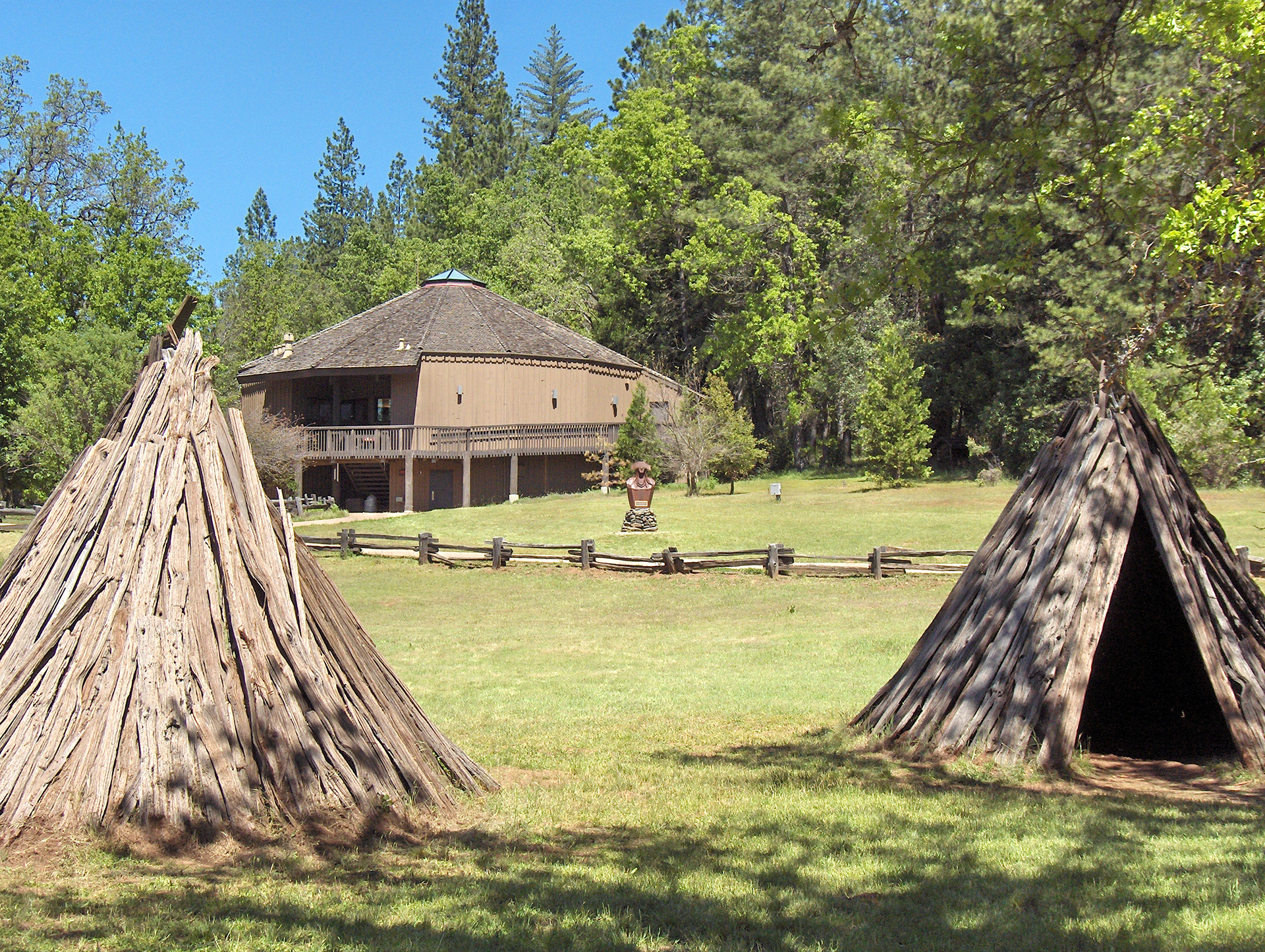
Visitor center overview of park

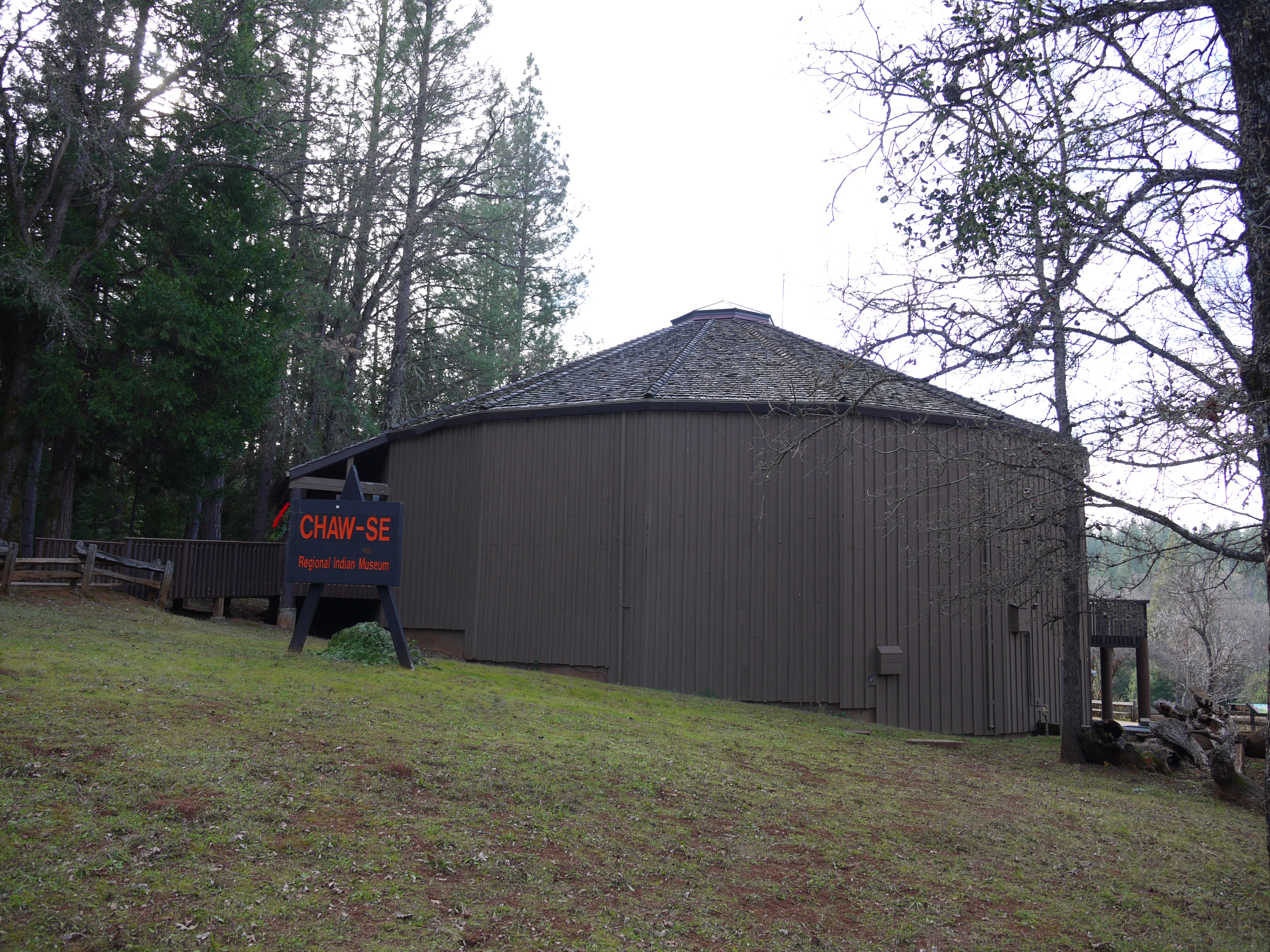
Chaw-Se building

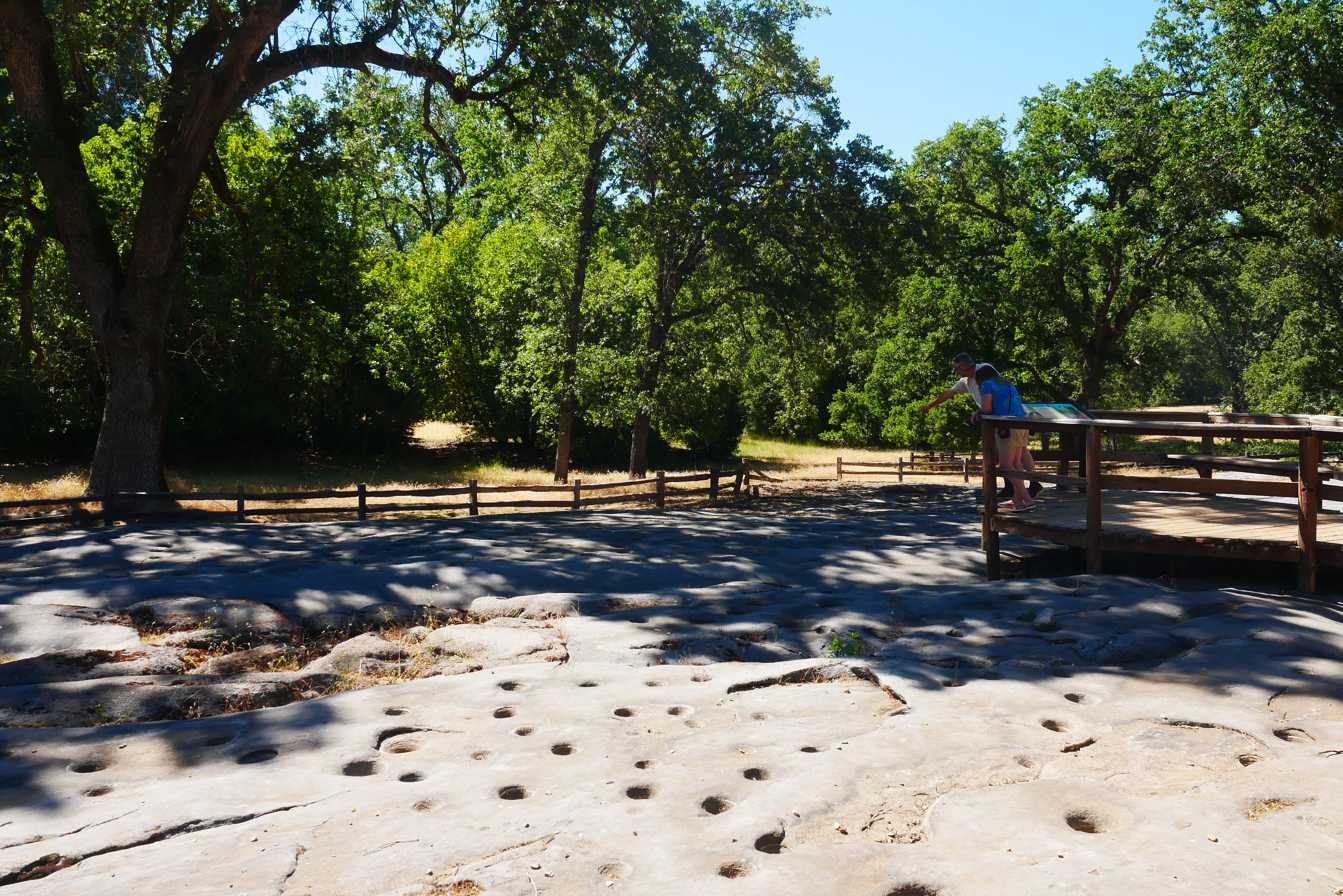

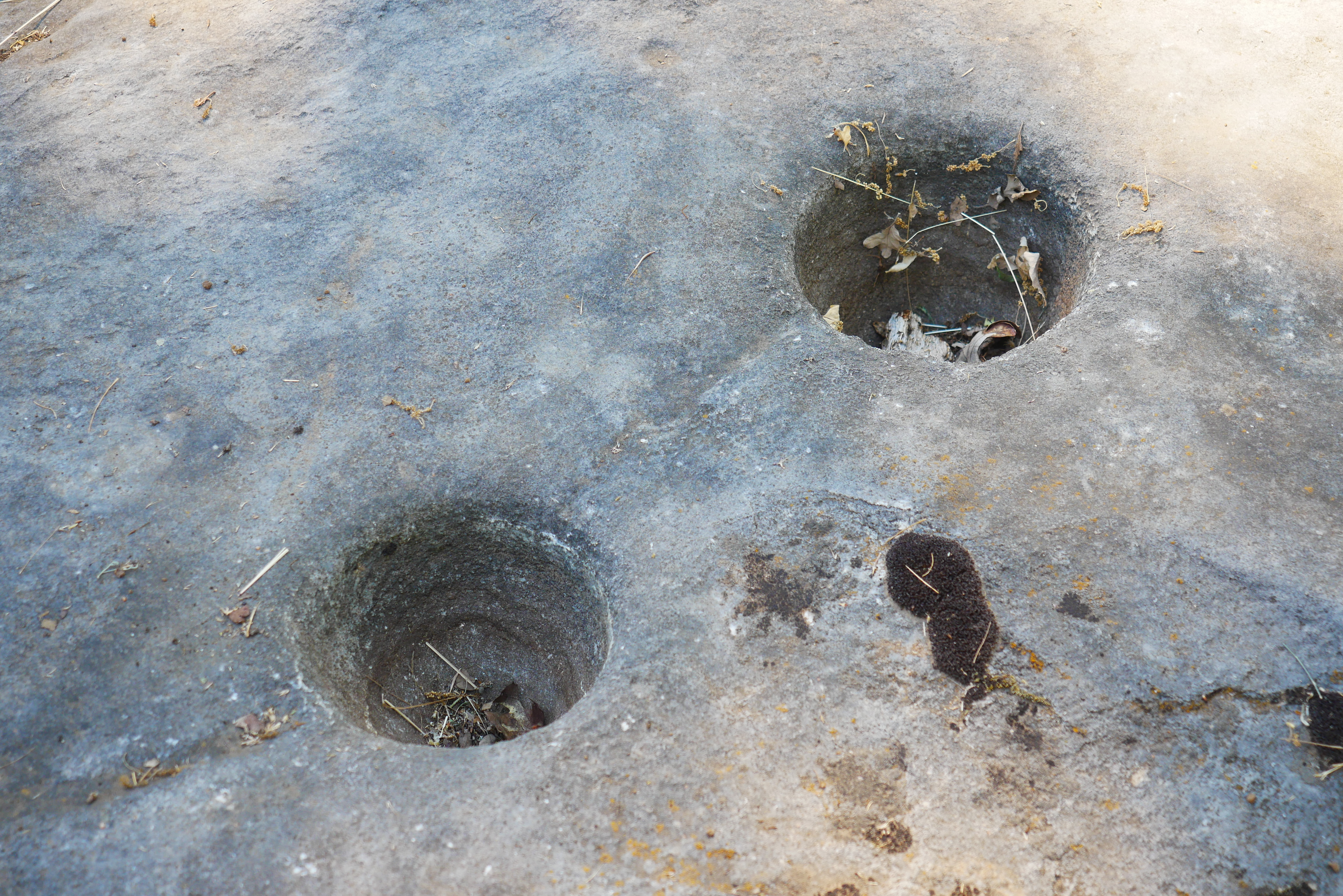
close up of grinding holes

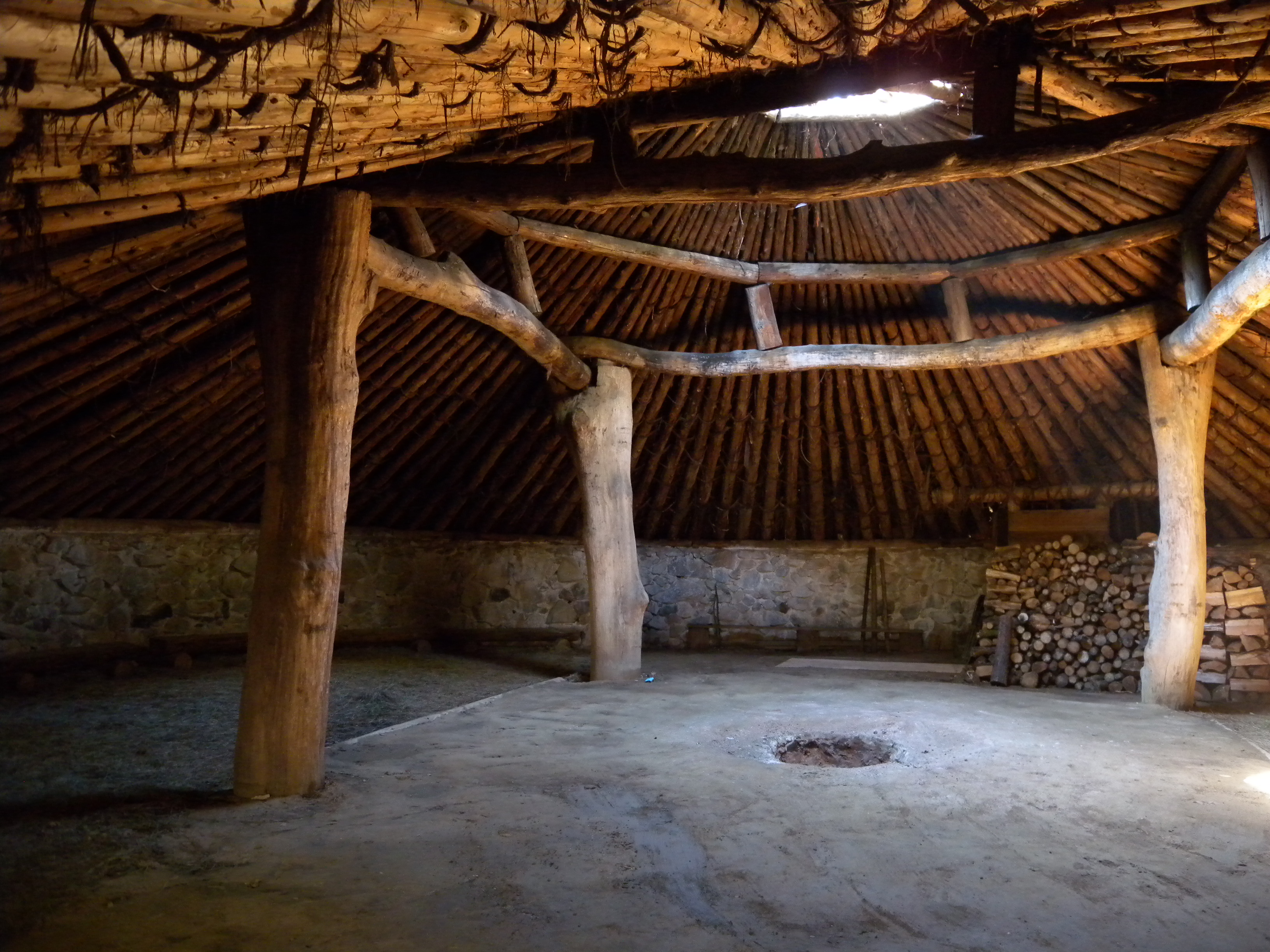
Roundhouse interior

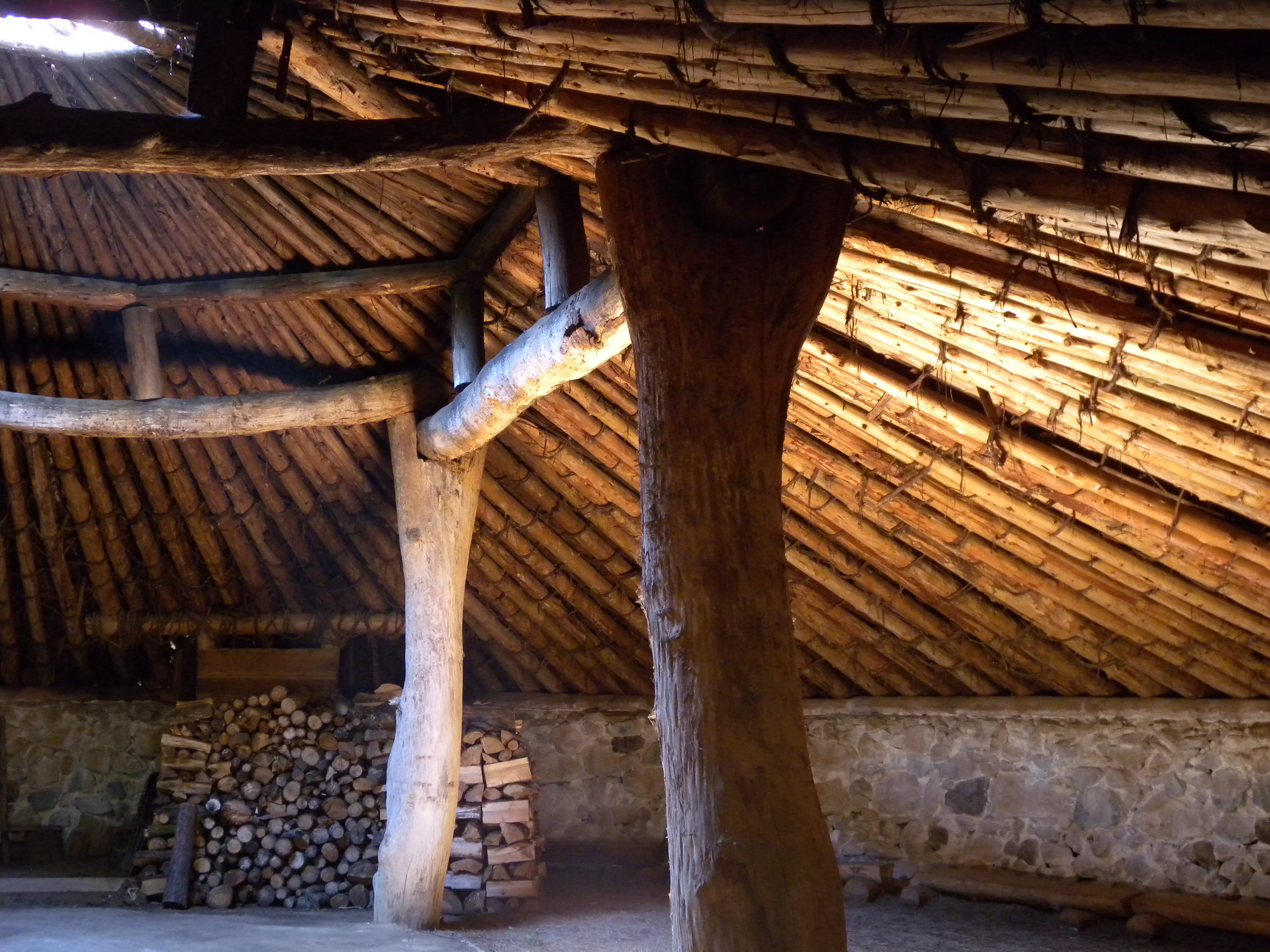

Sculpture at park

== See also ==
- List of California state parks
