= Clinton, California =

Unincorporated community in California, United States

Clinton
- Unincorporated community
- Location in California Clinton (the United States)
- Coordinates: 38°22′34″N 120°40′06″W
- Country: United States
- State: California
- County: Amador
- Elevation: 1,972 ft (601 m)

Population (2016)
  - Total: 45

California Historical Landmark
- Reference no.: 37

Clinton (formerly Sarahville, Sarahsville, and Lincoln) is a small town in Amador County, California, United States. It is located 2.5 miles (4.0 km) south of Pine Grove, at an elevation of 1972 feet (601 m). Clinton was the center of a placer mining community during the 1850s and of quartz mining as late as the 1880s. This town once decided Amador County elections as its votes were always counted last. Clinton is registered as a California Historical Landmark. A post office operated at Clinton from 1856 to 1859. Nowadays, Clinton is a picturesque little town made up of an assemblage of homes and historic buildings around the center of town. It has a population of approximately 45.
