= Plymouth, California =

City in California, United States

- City
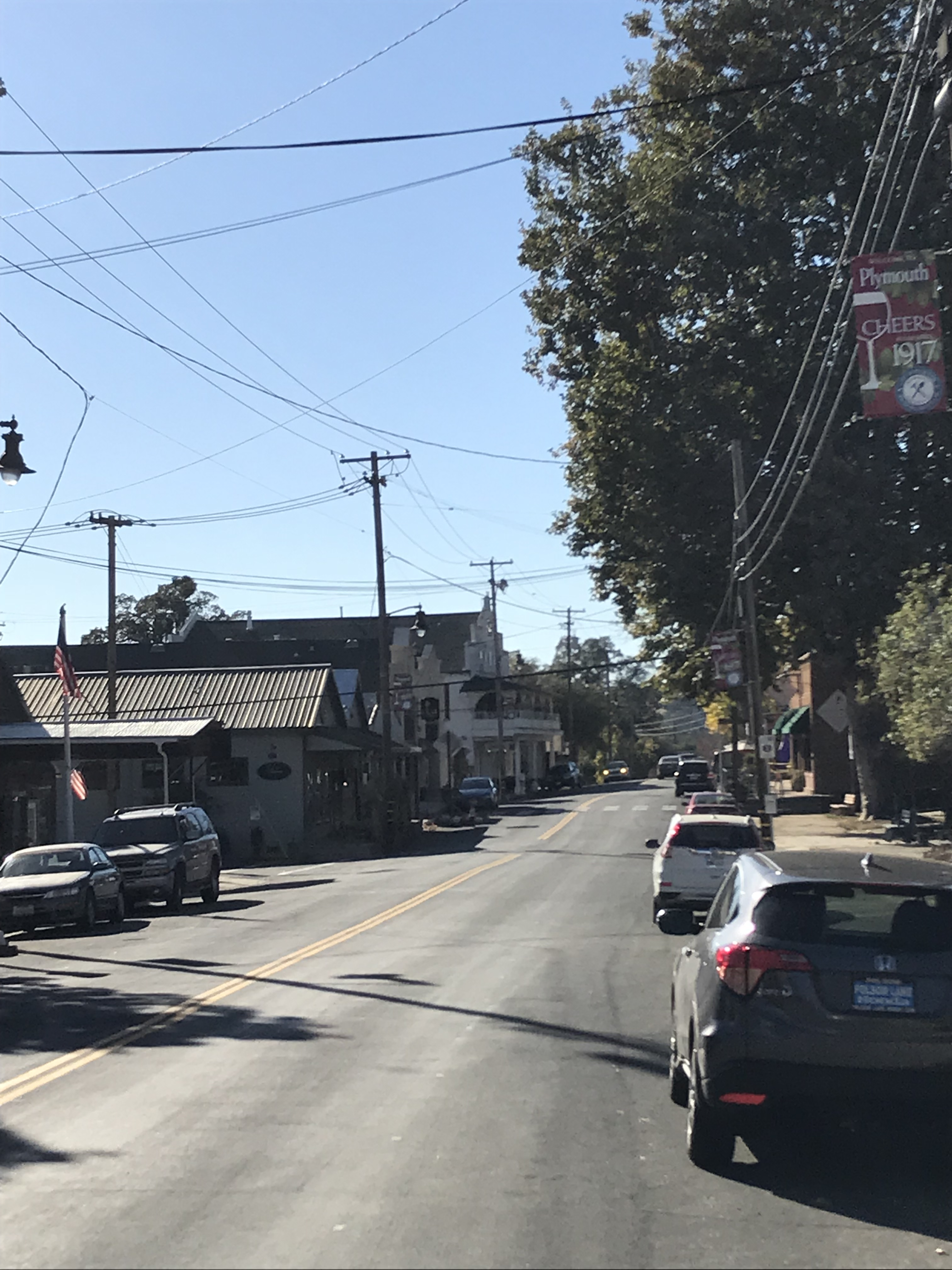
- Main Street in Plymouth
- Nickname: Gateway to Shenandoah Valley
- Interactive map of Plymouth, California
- Location in California Plymouth, California (the United States)
- Coordinates: 38°28′55″N 120°50′41″W
- Country: United States
- State: California
- County: Amador
- Settled: 1853
- Incorporated: February 8, 1917

Government
  - Mayor: Don Nunn
  - Vice Mayor: Holger Hornisch
  - City Manager: Cameron Begbie
  - State Senate State Assembly: Marie Alvarado-Gil (R); Heather Hadwick (R)
  - U. S. Congress: Tom McClintock (R)

Area
  - Total: 2.66 sq mi (6.89 km^{2})
  - Land: 2.65 sq mi (6.86 km^{2})
  - Water: 0.012 sq mi (0.03 km^{2}) 0.49%
- Elevation: 1,080 ft (330 m)

Population (2020)
  - Total: 1,078
  - Density: 407/sq mi (157/km^{2})
- Time zone: UTC-8 (PST)
  - Summer (DST): UTC-7 (PDT)
- ZIP code: 95669
- Area code: 209
- FIPS code: 06-57834
- GNIS feature IDs: 277579, 2411446
- Website: www.cityofplymouth.org

Plymouth (formerly Puckerville, Pokerville, and Poker Camp) is a city in Amador County, California, United States. The population was 1,078 at the 2020 census. The town was originally named Pokerville, when it was settled during the time of the gold rush. Plymouth is commonly now known as a "Gateway to Shenandoah Valley", a popular wine-producing region in the Sierra foothills.

== Geography ==
Plymouth is located at 38°28′55″N 120°50′41″W

According to the United States Census Bureau, the city has a total area of 2.7 square miles (7.0 square kilometers), of which 98.51 percent is land and 0.49 percent is water.

== History ==
A post office was opened in 1871. The city incorporated in 1917. The Plymouth Trading Post is a registered as California Historical Landmark #41.

=== Climate ===
According to the Köppen Climate Classification system, Plymouth has a warm-summer Mediterranean climate, abbreviated "Csa" on climate maps.

== Demographics ==
Historical population
Census	Pop.	Note	%±
1880	740		—
1890	768		3.8%
1920	657		—
1930	343		−47.8%
1940	460		34.1%
1950	382		−17.0%
1960	489		28.0%
1970	501		2.5%
1980	699		39.5%
1990	811		16.0%
2000	980		20.8%
2010	1,005		2.6%
2020	1,078		7.3%
U.S. Decennial Census

=== 2020 census ===
As of the 2020 census, Plymouth had a population of 1,078 and a population density of 406.9 inhabitants per square mile (157.1/km^{2}). The median age was 46.8 years. The age distribution was 19.9% under the age of 18, 6.9% aged 18 to 24, 22.3% aged 25 to 44, 27.6% aged 45 to 64, and 23.3% who were 65 years of age or older. For every 100 females, there were 96.7 males, and for every 100 females age 18 and over, there were 95.7 males age 18 and over. 0.0% of residents lived in urban areas, while 100.0% lived in rural areas.

The Census reported that 98.5% of the population lived in households, 1.5% lived in non-institutionalized group quarters, and none were institutionalized. There were 430 households, out of which 28.1% had children under the age of 18 living in them. Of all households, 50.5% were married-couple households, 7.2% were cohabiting couple households, 25.3% had a female householder with no spouse or partner present, and 17.0% had a male householder with no spouse or partner present. About 23.1% of all households were made up of individuals, and 13.0% had someone living alone who was 65 years of age or older. The average household size was 2.47. There were 298 families (69.3% of all households).

There were 503 housing units at an average density of 189.9 units per square mile (73.3 units/km^{2}), of which 430 (85.5%) were occupied. Of these, 65.8% were owner-occupied and 34.2% were occupied by renters. The vacancy rate was 14.5%, including a homeowner vacancy rate of 1.7% and a rental vacancy rate of 5.8%.

Racial composition as of the 2020 census
Race	Number	Percent
White	755	70.0%
Black or African American	7	0.6%
American Indian and Alaska Native	28	2.6%
Asian	13	1.2%
Native Hawaiian and Other Pacific Islander	6	0.6%
Some other race	115	10.7%
Two or more races	154	14.3%
Hispanic or Latino (of any race)	263	24.4%
