= Ione, California =

City in California, United States

- City
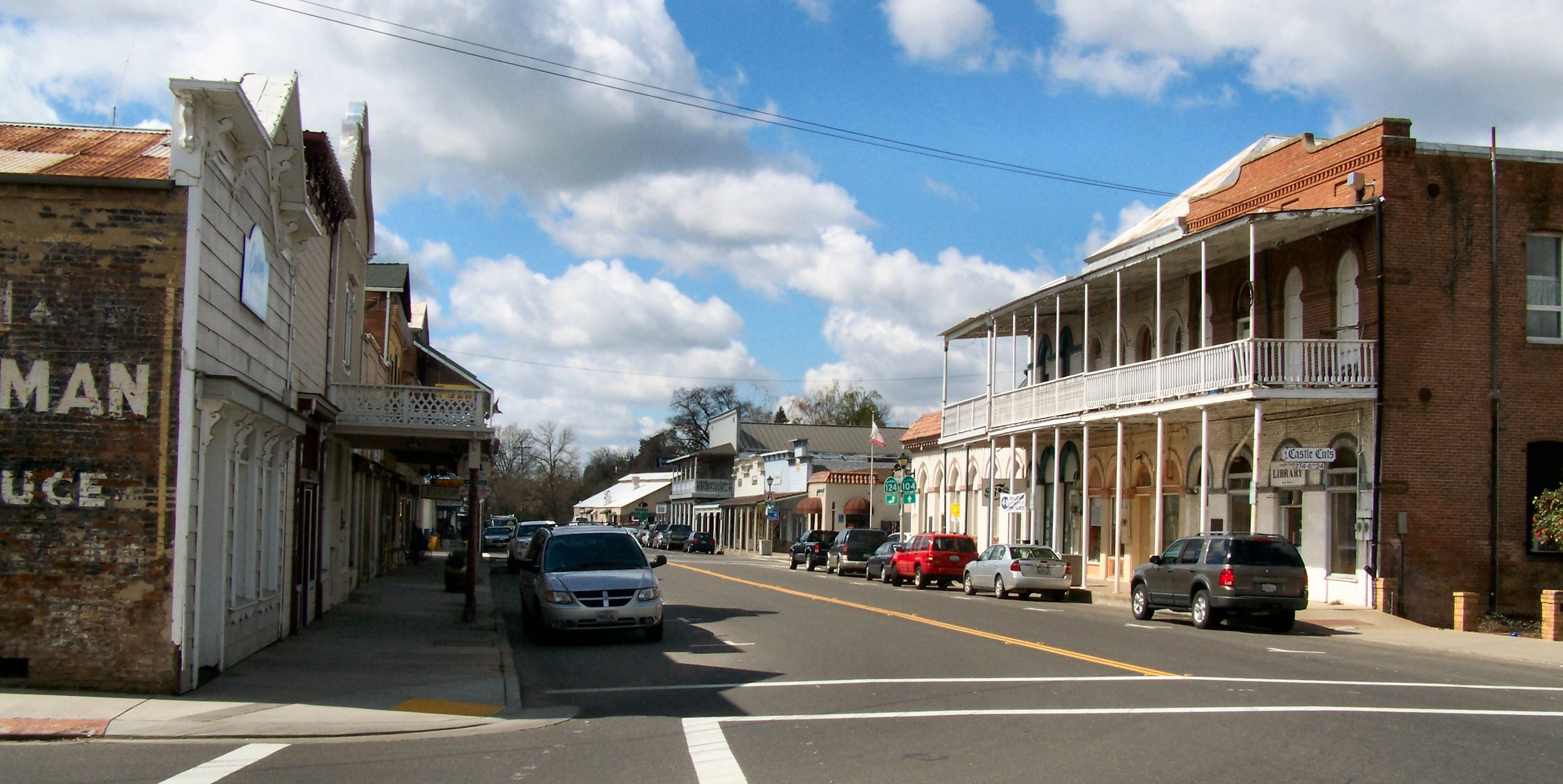
- Main Street in Ione
- Interactive map of Ione, California
- Location in California Ione, California (the United States)
- Coordinates: 38°21′10″N 120°55′58″W
- Country: United States
- State: California
- County: Amador
- Settled: 1849
- Incorporated: March 23, 1953

Government
  - Mayor: Stacy Rhoades
  - Vice Mayor: Jody Maita
  - City Manager: George Lee
  - State Senate: Marie Alvarado-Gil (R)
  - State Assembly: Heath Flora (R)
  - U. S. Congress: Tom McClintock (R)

Area
  - Total: 4.63 sq mi (11.98 km^{2})
  - Land: 4.58 sq mi (11.86 km^{2})
  - Water: 0.046 sq mi (0.12 km^{2}) 0.99%
- Elevation: 299 ft (91 m)

Population (2020)
  - Total: 5,141
  - Density: 1,123/sq mi (433.5/km^{2})
- Time zone: UTC-8 (PST)
  - Summer (DST): UTC-7 (PDT)
- ZIP code: 95640
- Area code: 209
- FIPS code: 06-36672
- GNIS feature ID: 1658830, 2410110
- Website: www.ione.ca.gov

Ione (/aɪˈoʊn/ eye-OWN) is a city in Amador County, California, United States. As of the 2020 census the population is 5,141, which is a 35.1% decrease from the 2010 census. Once known as "Bedbug" and "Freeze Out," Ione was an important supply center on the main road to the Mother Lode and Southern Mines during the California gold rush.

== History ==
Ione is the historical home of the Sierra Miwok Indians. In 1840, the future town site became part of the Mexican land grant Rancho Arroyo Seco in Alta California.

The town is located in the fertile Ione Valley; it is believed to have been named by Thomas Brown around 1849 after one of the heroines in Edward Bulwer-Lytton's drama The Last Days of Pompeii, but conflicting legends and sources for the name exist. During the days of the California gold rush, the miners knew the town by the names of "Bedbug" and "Freezeout." Unlike other communities in Amador County that were founded on gold mining, Ione was a supply center, stage and rail stop, and agricultural hub.

The first post office opened in 1852. The town of Ione continued to grow and prosper after its gold rush founding. The first school was built in 1853. The historic Methodist Church was organized in 1853 and the structure was completed in 1862. The first flour mill was built in 1855. The first brick building was built by Daniel Stewart, D. Stewart Company Store, in 1855 for his general merchandise store. It is still owned and operated by Stewart family descendants.

In March 1865, Camp Jackson was built nearby. It was garrisoned by Company D, 2nd California Volunteer Cavalry, who stayed for three months before moving to a new post.

At the centennial celebration of 1876, Ione had a population of about 600, which included about 100 Chinese who lived in Ione's Chinatown. The town included one public school, four churches, four general stores, one meat market, one laundry, one brewery, a restaurant, millinery shop, an art gallery, six saloons, a drug store and barber shop, and many other business establishments. The centennial also celebrated the completion of the Stockton and Ione Railroad, which had been incorporated in 1873 to build a 40-mile (64 km) long narrow gauge railroad from Stockton via Linden to Ione. It ceased operations in 1876.

The centennial celebration was the beginning of what is now known as the Ione Homecoming. This annual celebration has been held during the month of May almost every year since that first Centennial celebration in 1876. It is held annually on the second full weekend in May.

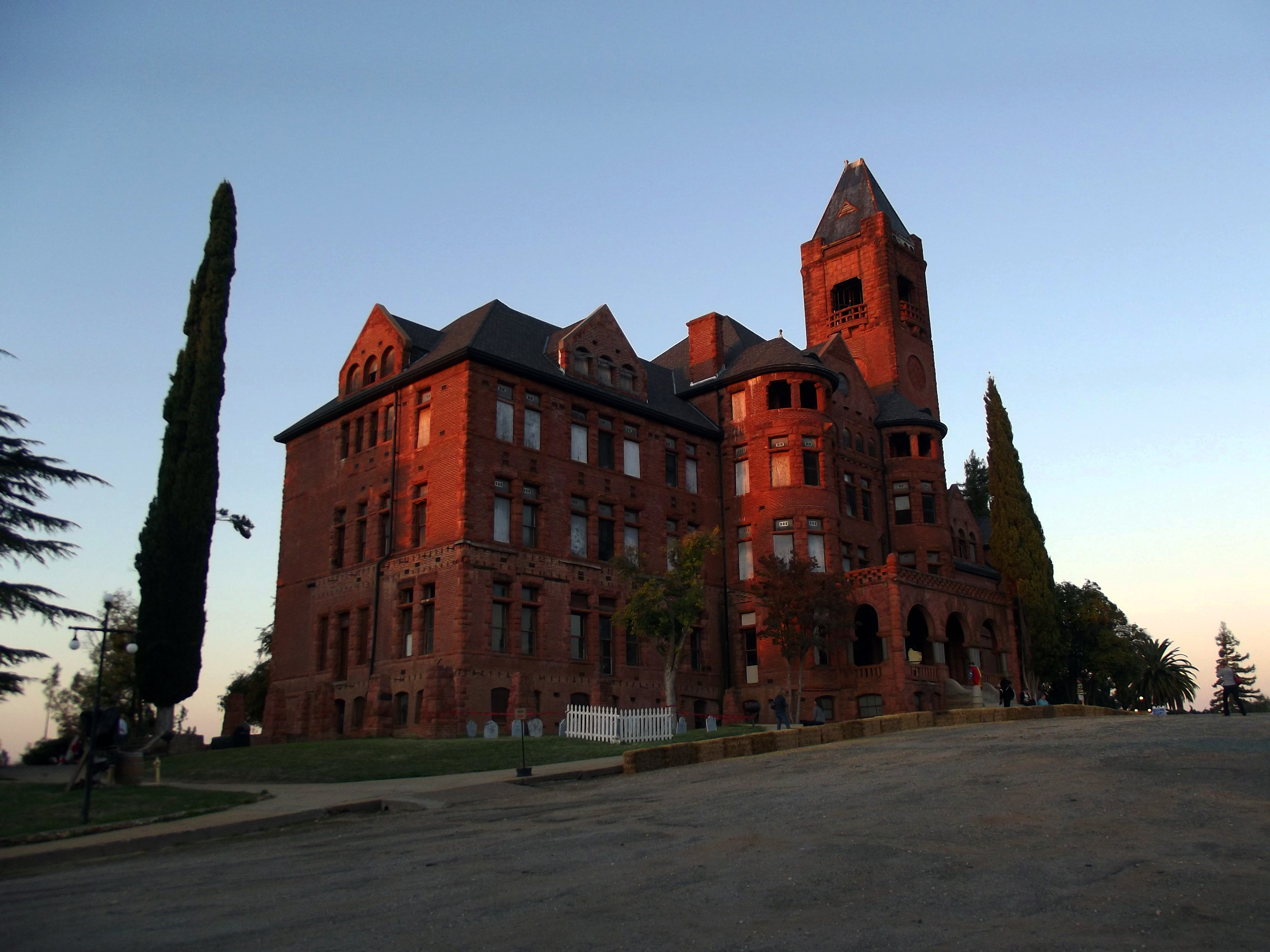
Preston School of Industry, a.k.a. Preston Castle

The City of Ione was incorporated as a General Law City in 1953.

Ione has many landmarks and historical points of interest. Three are listed as California Historical Landmarks:

- The Preston School of Industry, known as The Castle, was built between 1890–1894 to serve as a school for juveniles referred by the courts. The Castle is not in use, but the Preston Castle Foundation is working to help restore it.
- Community Methodist Church of Ione
- D. Stewart Company Store (#788)

== Geography ==
Ione is located at 38°21′10″N 120°55′58″W. According to the United States Census Bureau, the city has a total area of 4.63 square miles (11.98 km^{2}), of which 4.58 square miles (11.86 km^{2}) is land and 0.046 square miles (0.12 km^{2}) (0.99%) is water.

=== Climate ===
According to the Köppen Climate Classification system, Ione has a warm-summer Mediterranean climate, abbreviated "Csa" on climate maps.

Climate data for Ione, 1991–2020 simulated normals (308 ft elevation)
Month	Jan	Feb	Mar	Apr	May	Jun	Jul	Aug	Sep	Oct	Nov	Dec	Year
Mean daily maximum °F (°C)	55.6 (13.1)	60.6 (15.9)	65.5 (18.6)	71.1 (21.7)	79.3 (26.3)	87.6 (30.9)	93.6 (34.2)	92.8 (33.8)	88.0 (31.1)	78.1 (25.6)	64.8 (18.2)	55.9 (13.3)	74.4 (23.6)
Daily mean °F (°C)	47.3 (8.5)	50.9 (10.5)	54.7 (12.6)	58.6 (14.8)	65.3 (18.5)	71.8 (22.1)	76.5 (24.7)	76.1 (24.5)	72.3 (22.4)	64.0 (17.8)	53.8 (12.1)	47.1 (8.4)	61.5 (16.4)
Mean daily minimum °F (°C)	39.0 (3.9)	41.0 (5.0)	43.7 (6.5)	46.2 (7.9)	51.1 (10.6)	55.9 (13.3)	59.4 (15.2)	59.4 (15.2)	56.7 (13.7)	50.2 (10.1)	43.0 (6.1)	38.5 (3.6)	48.7 (9.3)
Average precipitation inches (mm)	4.17 (106.00)	4.01 (101.92)	3.61 (91.61)	2.39 (60.77)	0.87 (22.17)	0.25 (6.23)	0.00 (0.00)	0.02 (0.45)	0.15 (3.88)	1.06 (26.93)	2.35 (59.67)	3.84 (97.48)	22.72 (577.11)
Average dew point °F (°C)	41.2 (5.1)	42.4 (5.8)	44.4 (6.9)	44.6 (7.0)	47.5 (8.6)	50.7 (10.4)	52.7 (11.5)	51.6 (10.9)	49.1 (9.5)	45.3 (7.4)	43.5 (6.4)	40.3 (4.6)	46.1 (7.8)
Source: PRISM Climate Group

== Demographics ==
Historical population
Census	Pop.	Note	%±
1880	686		—
1890	806		17.5%
1960	1,118		—
1970	2,369		111.9%
1980	2,207		−6.8%
1990	6,516		195.2%
2000	7,129		9.4%
2010	7,918		11.1%
2020	5,141		−35.1%
2023 (est.)	5,431	▲	5.6%
U.S. Decennial Census

=== 2020 census ===
As of the 2020 census, Ione had a population of 5,141. The population density was 1,122.5 inhabitants per square mile (433.4/km^{2}). The median age was 43.6 years. The age distribution was 21.1% under the age of 18, 6.9% aged 18 to 24, 23.5% aged 25 to 44, 26.3% aged 45 to 64, and 22.2% who were 65 years of age or older. For every 100 females there were 105.6 males, and for every 100 females age 18 and over there were 104.9 males age 18 and over.

The Census reported that 94.9% of the population lived in households, 0.5% lived in non-institutionalized group quarters, and 4.6% were institutionalized. 90.9% of residents lived in urban areas, while 9.1% lived in rural areas.

There were 1,968 households, out of which 30.8% included children under the age of 18. Of all households, 52.7% were married-couple households, 5.3% were cohabiting couple households, 15.2% had a male householder with no spouse or partner present, and 26.8% had a female householder with no spouse or partner present. About 24.5% of all households were made up of individuals and 14.7% had someone living alone who was 65 years of age or older. The average household size was 2.48. There were 1,375 families (69.9% of all households).

There were 2,084 housing units at an average density of 455.0 units per square mile (175.7 units/km^{2}), of which 1,968 (94.4%) were occupied. Of these, 73.9% were owner-occupied and 26.1% were occupied by renters. Of all housing units, 5.6% were vacant. The homeowner vacancy rate was 1.1% and the rental vacancy rate was 5.9%.

Racial composition as of the 2020 census
Race	Number	Percent
White	3,908	76.0%
Black or African American	117	2.3%
American Indian and Alaska Native	99	1.9%
Asian	85	1.7%
Native Hawaiian and Other Pacific Islander	0	0.0%
Some other race	356	6.9%
Two or more races	576	11.2%
Hispanic or Latino (of any race)	874	17.0%

=== Demographic estimates ===
In 2023, the US Census Bureau estimated that 3.8% of the population were foreign-born. Of all people aged 5 or older, 89.8% spoke only English at home, 8.7% spoke Spanish, 0.0% spoke other Indo-European languages, 1.3% spoke Asian or Pacific Islander languages, and 0.2% spoke other languages. Of those aged 25 or older, 94.4% were high school graduates and 19.3% had a bachelor's degree.

=== Income and poverty ===
The median household income was $78,661, and the per capita income was $41,244. About 2.7% of families and 9.1% of the population were below the poverty line.

== Government ==
=== Politics ===
In the state legislature, Ione is in the 4th senatorial district, represented by Republican Marie Alvarado-Gil, and in the 9th Assembly district, represented by Republican Heath Flora. Federally, Ione is in California's 5th congressional district, represented by Republican Tom McClintock.

=== State government ===
Mule Creek State Prison is located in the community. According to the Mule Creek State Prison website, there are 3,782 prisoners residing in the facility, well above the designed capacity of 1,700. They account for more than half of Ione's total population.

Adjacent to Mule Creek is the California Department of Forestry and Fire Protection Training Academy, which trains staff from all over California. Also located here is the Preston Youth Correctional Facility (formerly the Preston School of Industry, which was deactivated in 2011).

== Notable people ==
- Tiny Bonham, baseball pitcher for ten seasons
- Dave Brubeck, jazz pianist, raised in Ione
- Justin Grant, racing driver
- Merle Haggard, singer and songwriter
- Eliza Withington (1825–1877), photographer
