= Sutter Hill, California =

Unincorporated community in California, United States

Sutter Hill
- Unincorporated community
- Location in California Sutter Hill (the United States)
- Coordinates: 38°22′42″N 120°48′06″W
- Country: United States
- State: California
- County: Amador
- Elevation: 1,562 ft (476 m)

Sutter Hill is an unincorporated community in Amador County, California, United States. It is located 7.25 miles (11.7 km) south-southeast of Plymouth, at an elevation of 1562 feet (476 m), or just north of Jackson along California State Route 49.

Sutter Hill was the site of the establishment of Amador County in 1854. The Botto family established an estate on Sutter Hill in 1860 and lived there for five generations; other Italian families in the area established the Italian Benevolent Society of Amador County to support local miners. The society holds an annual picnic and parade in the area. By 1967, Sutter Hill had become a commercial district with supermarkets, lumber centers, general shopping centers, and the Amador County Airport.

== See also ==
- Sutter Hill Ventures
