= Amador County, California =

County in California, United States

Coordinates: 38.44°N 120.66°W

Amador County
- County
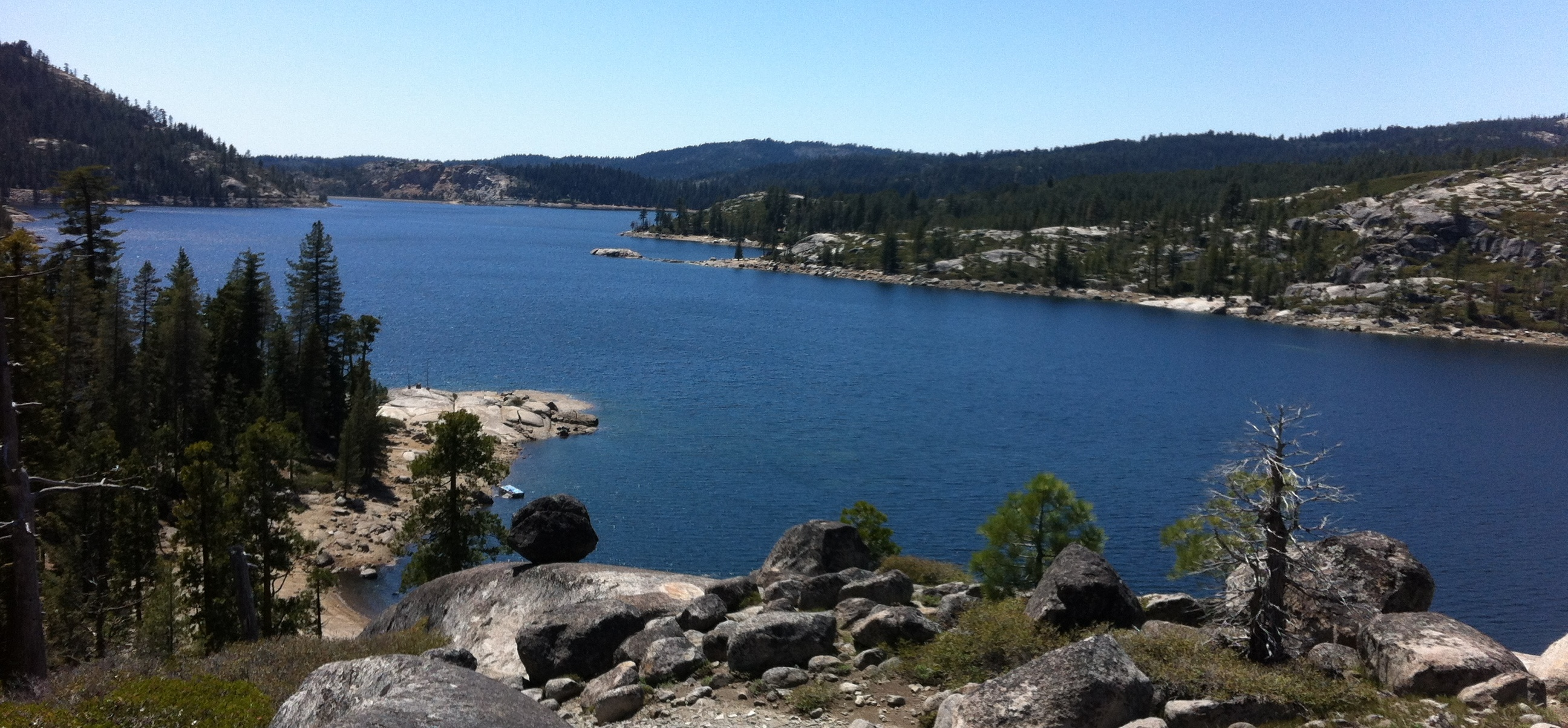
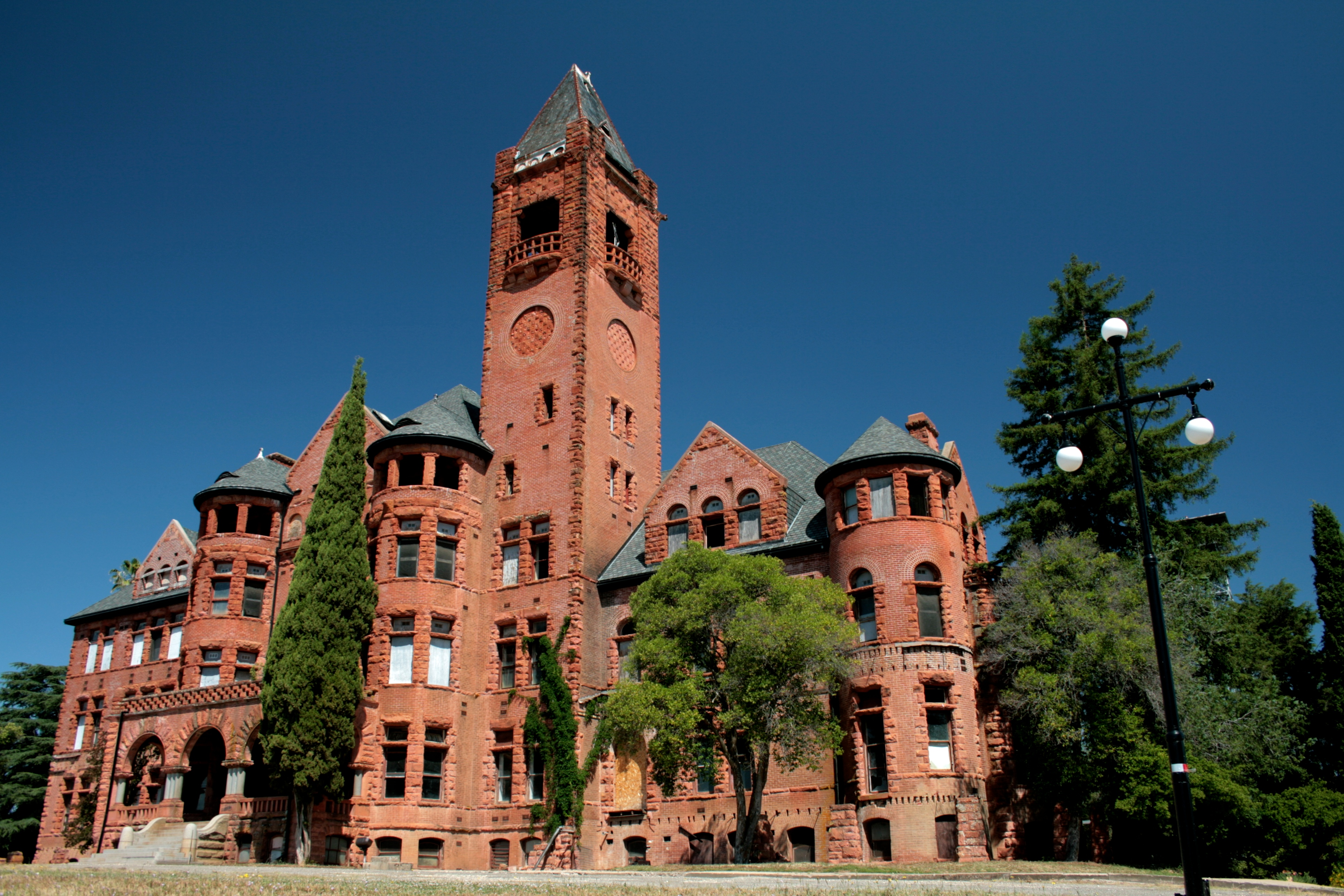
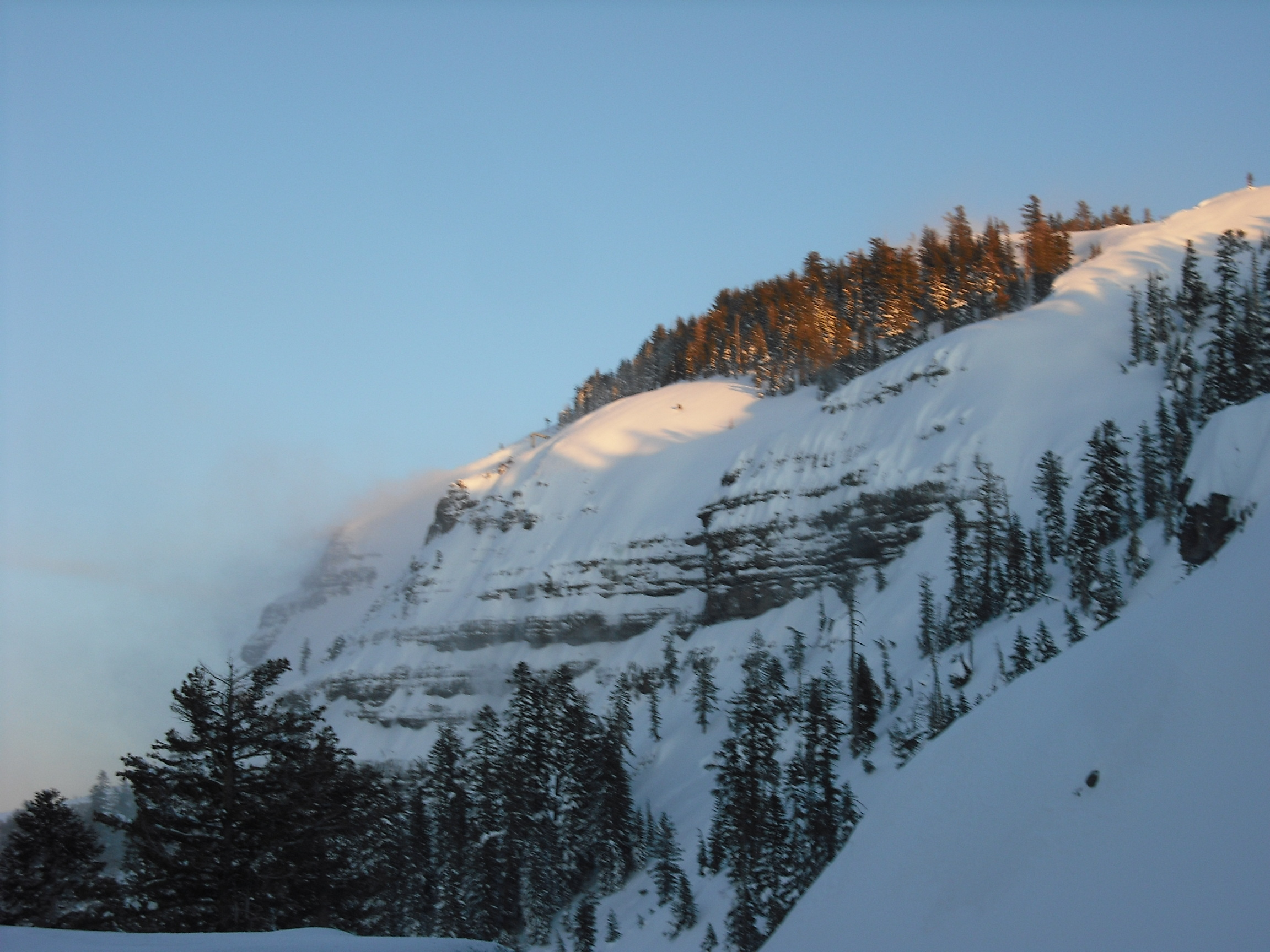
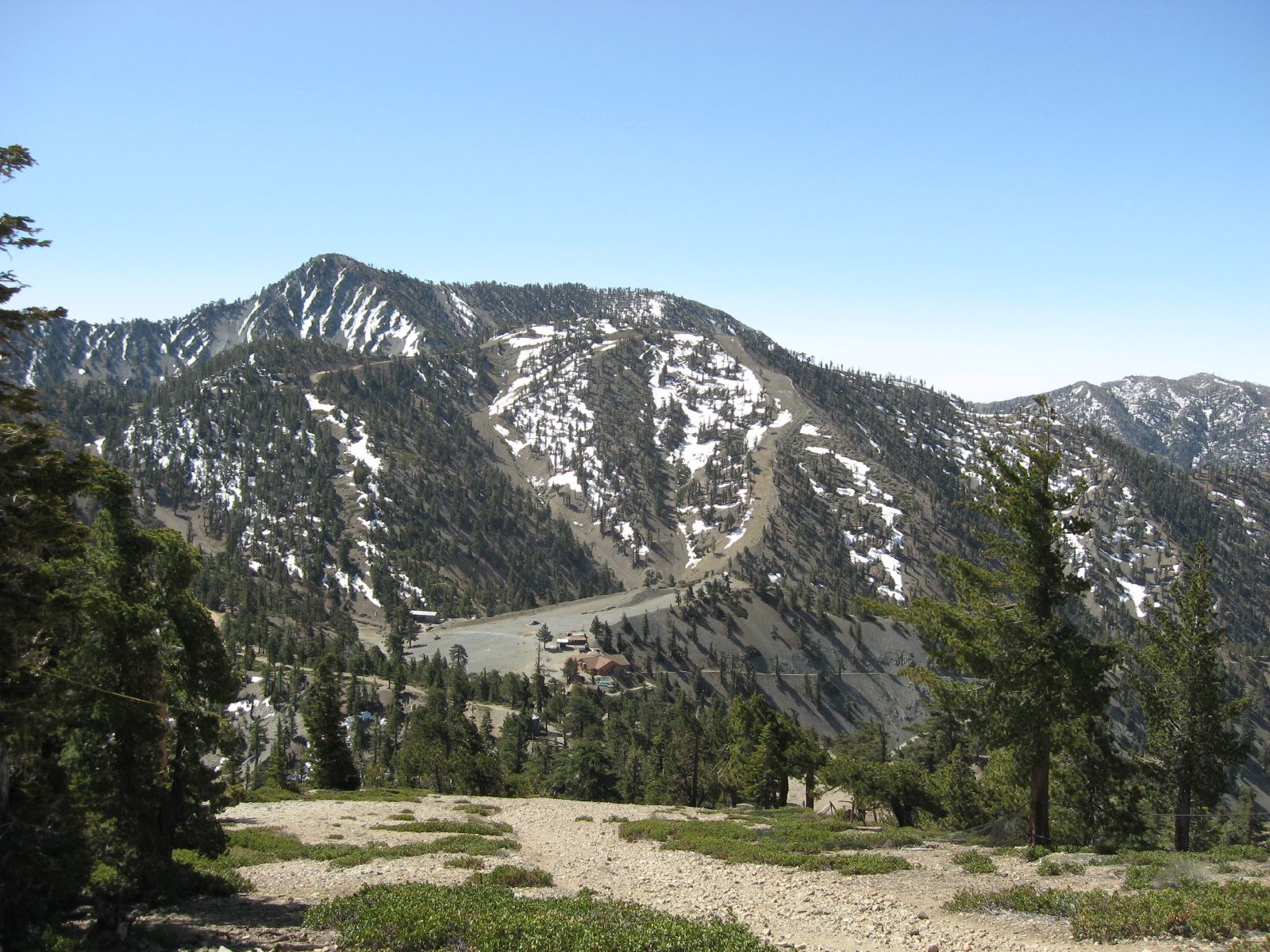
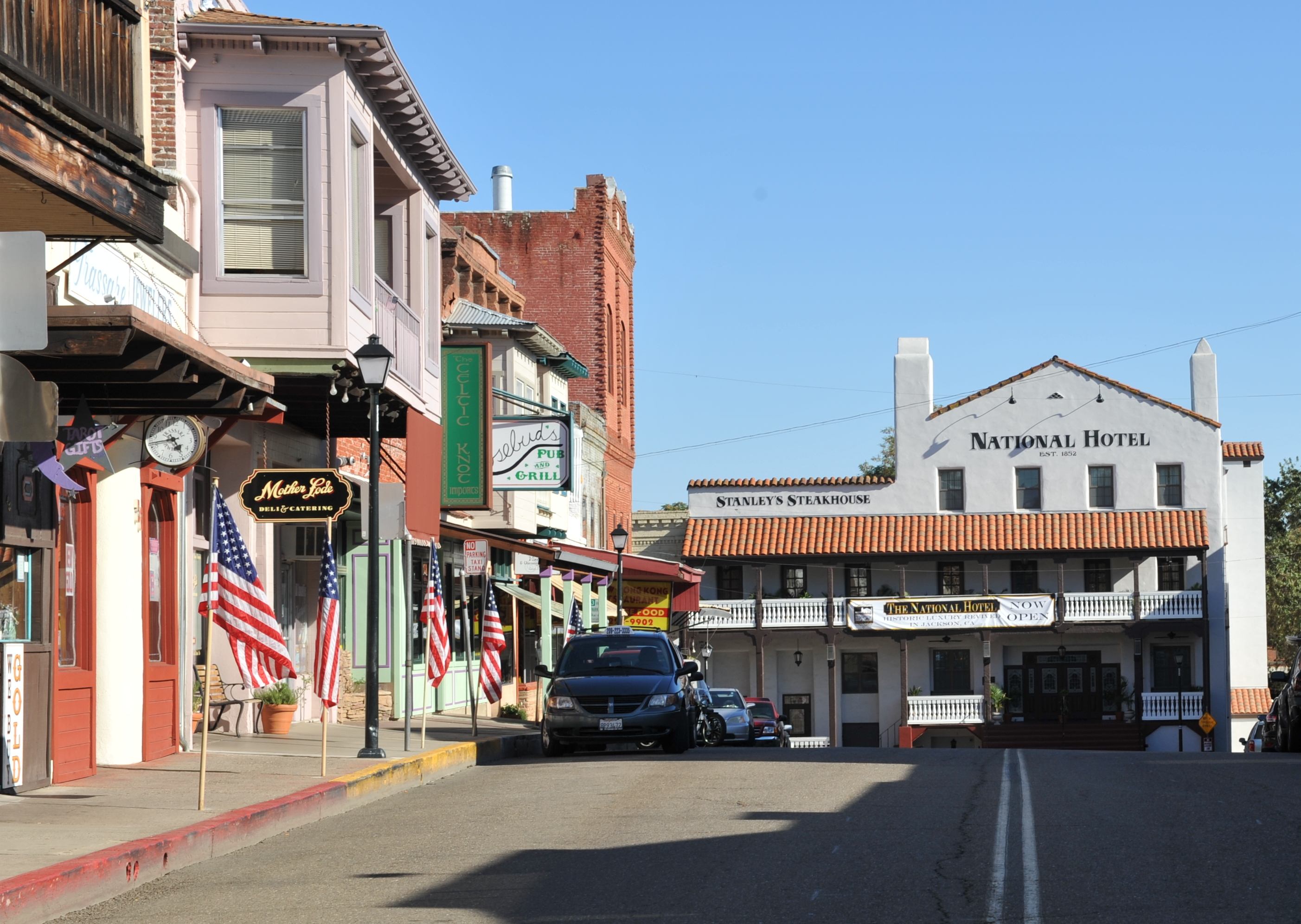
- Lower Bear River Reservoir Preston Castle Eldorado Forest Thunder Mountain Jackson

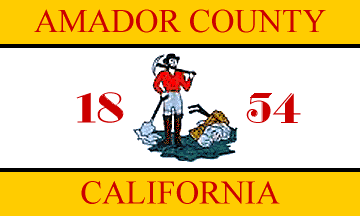
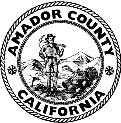
- Flag Seal
- Nickname: "The Heart of the Mother Lode"
- Interactive map of Amador County
- Country: United States
- State: California
- Region: Sierra Nevada
- Incorporated: May 1, 1854
- Named for: José María Amador
- County seat: Jackson
- Largest city: Ione (population and area)

Government
  - Type: Council–CAO
  - Body: Board of Supervisors: Pat Crew; Dan Epperson; Jeff Brown; Logan Carnell; Brian Oneto
  - Chair: Jeff Brown
  - Vice Chair: Pat Crew
  - County Administrative Officer: Chuck Iley

Area
  - Total: 606 sq mi (1,570 km^{2})
  - Land: 595 sq mi (1,540 km^{2})
  - Water: 11.4 sq mi (30 km^{2})
- Highest elevation: 9,414 ft (2,869 m)

Population (2020)
  - Total: 40,474
  - Estimate (2025): 41,876 ▲
  - Density: 68.0/sq mi (26.3/km^{2})

GDP
  - Total: $1.921 billion (2022)
- Time zone: UTC-8 (Pacific Time Zone)
  - Summer (DST): UTC-7 (Pacific Daylight Time)
- Area code: 209
- FIPS code: 06-005
- GNIS feature ID: 1675841
- Congressional district: 5th
- Website: www.co.amador.ca.us

Amador County (/ˈæmədɔːr/) is a county located in the U.S. state of California, in the Sierra Nevada. As of the 2020 census, the population was 40,474. The county seat is Jackson. Amador County, located within California's Gold Country, is known as "The Heart of the Mother Lode." There is a substantial viticulture industry in the county.

== History ==
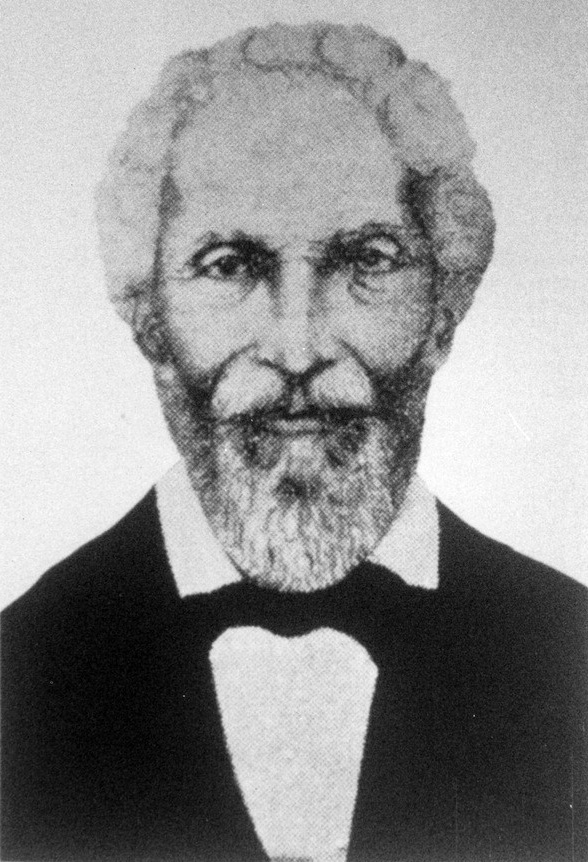
Amador County is named after José María Amador, a Californio miner who found gold in the area in 1848.

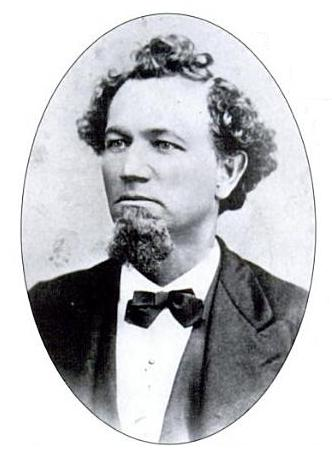
Dr. Charles Boarman (1828–1880), son of Rear Admiral Charles Boarman, and his family settled in the area. He served as the first county physician and coroner from 1863 to 1880.

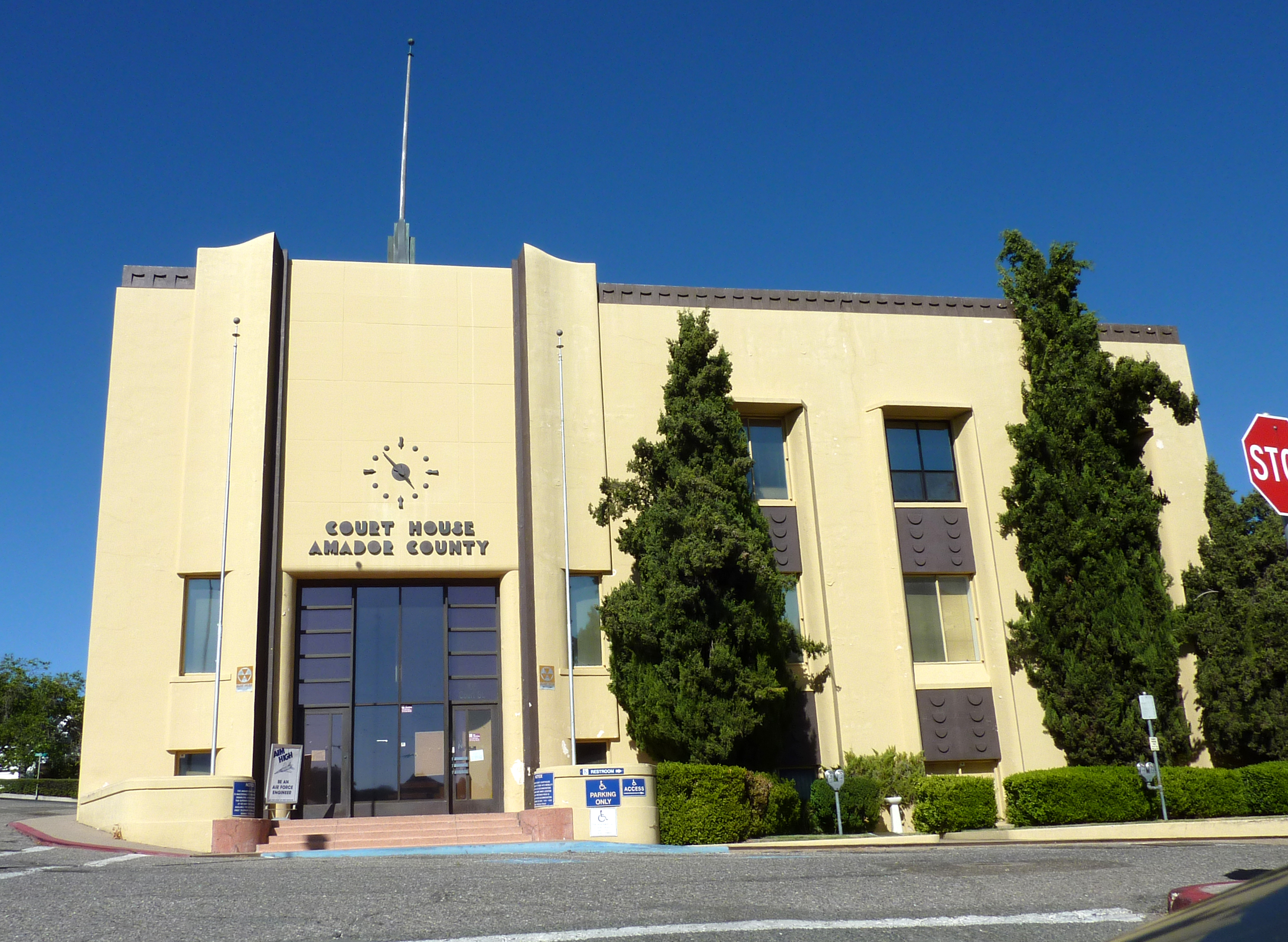
The former Amador County Courthouse consists of two buildings: the second courthouse (built 1864) and the Hall of Records (1893), that were enclosed and combined in 1939 with an Art Deco exterior.

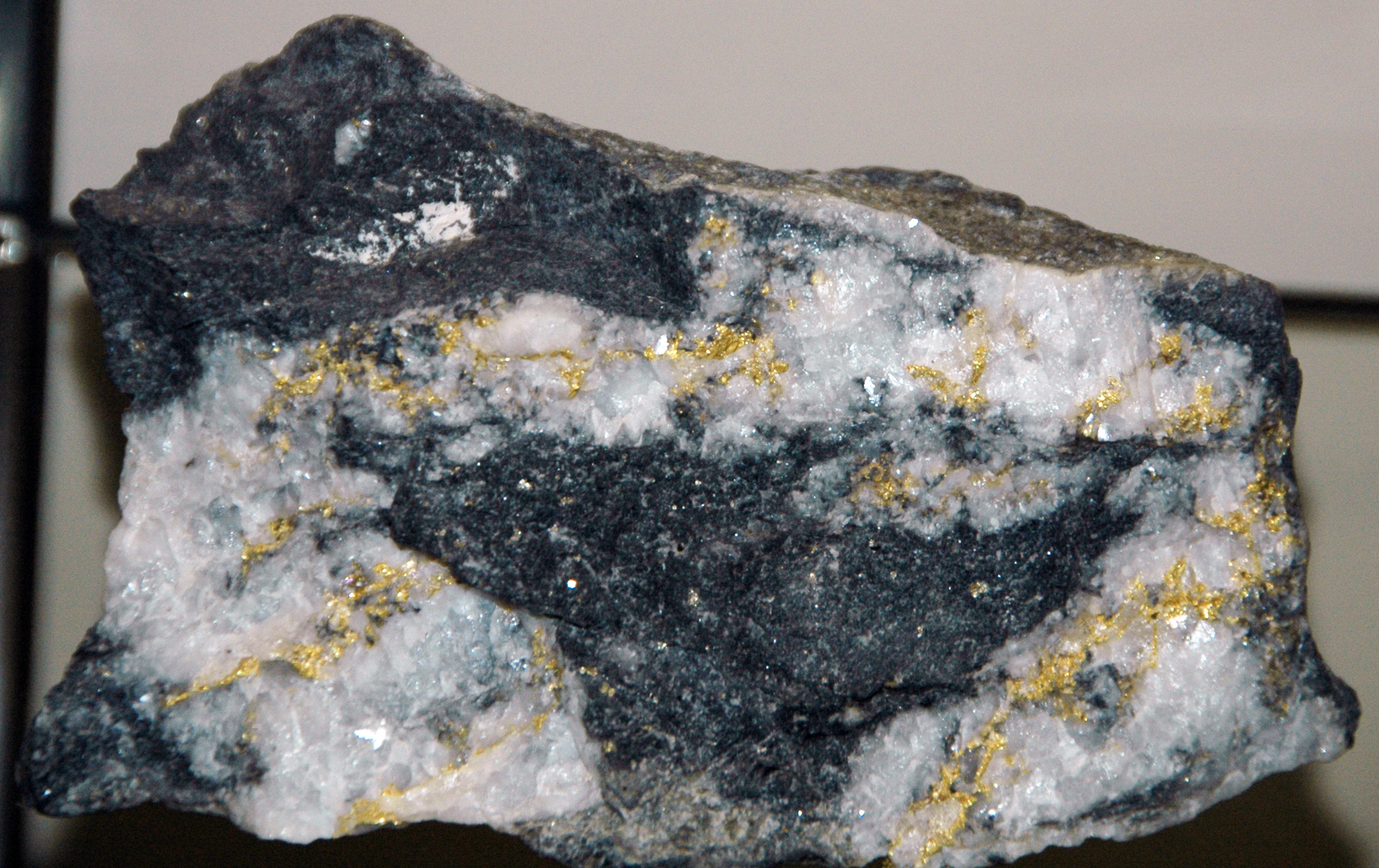
High-grade gold-quartz ore from Amador County

Amador County was created by the California Legislature on May 11, 1854, from parts of Calaveras and El Dorado counties. It was organized on July 3, 1854. In 1864, part of the county's territory was given to Alpine County.

The county is named for José María Amador, a soldier, rancher, and miner, born in San Francisco in 1794, the son of Sergeant Pedro Amador (a Spanish soldier who settled in California in 1771) and younger brother to Sinforosa Amador.

In 1848, Jose Maria Amador, with several Native Americans, established a successful gold mining camp near the present town of Amador City. In Spanish, the word amador means "one who loves". Some of the Mother Lode's most successful gold mines were located in Amador County, including the Kennedy, Argonaut, and Keystone.

During the outbreak of Civil War the county organized Company C, 1st California Infantry and Company D, 4th California Infantry. Not everyone supported the Union; in April 1862, when the stars and stripes flew from a house, a local judge cursed at it.

Company C, "Amador Volunteers"

There are numerous gold mines in Amador County, including the Argonaut Mine, the Kennedy Mine, the Central Eureka, and the Lincoln. The Kennedy Mine in Jackson was the deepest gold mine of its time. The federal government closed all of the Mother Lode's mines in 1942 because they were considered non-essential to the war effort.

== Geography ==
According to the U.S. Census Bureau, the county has a total area of 606 square miles (1,570 km^{2}), of which 595 square miles (1,540 km^{2}) is land and 11.4 square miles (30 km^{2}) (1.9%) is water. It is the fifth-smallest county in California by land area and second-smallest by total area. Water bodies in the county include Lake Amador, Lake Camanche, Pardee Reservoir, Bear River Reservoir, Silver Lake, Sutter Creek, Cosumnes River, Mokelumne River, and Lake Tabeaud. Thirty-seven miles of the North Fork and main Mokelumne River were added to the California Wild and Scenic Rivers System on June 27, 2018, when Governor Edmund G. "Jerry" Brown signed Senate Bill 854.

Amador County is located approximately 45 miles (72 km) southeast of Sacramento in the part of California known as the Mother Lode, or Gold Country in the Sierra Nevada.

Amador County ranges in elevation from approximately 250 feet (76 m) in the western portion of the county to over 9,000 feet (2,700 m) in the eastern portion of the county, the tallest point being Thunder Mountain. The county is bordered on the north by the Cosumnes River and El Dorado County and on the south by the Mokelumne River and Calaveras County, on the west by Sacramento and San Joaquin Counties, and the east by Alpine County.

=== Adjacent counties ===
- El Dorado County – north
- Alpine County – east
- Calaveras County – south
- San Joaquin County – southwest
- Sacramento County – west

=== National protected area ===
- Eldorado National Forest (part)
- Mokelumne Wilderness (part)

== Demographics ==
Historical population
Census	Pop.	Note	%±
1860	10,930		—
1870	9,582		−12.3%
1880	11,384		18.8%
1890	10,320		−9.3%
1900	11,116		7.7%
1910	9,086		−18.3%
1920	7,793		−14.2%
1930	8,494		9.0%
1940	8,973		5.6%
1950	9,151		2.0%
1960	9,990		9.2%
1970	11,821		18.3%
1980	19,314		63.4%
1990	30,039		55.5%
2000	35,100		16.8%
2010	38,091		8.5%
2020	40,474		6.3%
2025 (est.)	41,876	▲	3.5%
U.S. Decennial Census; 1790–1960 1900–1990; 1990–2000 2010 2020

=== 2020 census ===
As of the 2020 census, the county had a population of 40,474. The median age was 51.6 years. 15.9% of residents were under the age of 18 and 28.4% of residents were 65 years of age or older. For every 100 females there were 119.9 males, and for every 100 females age 18 and over there were 121.9 males age 18 and over.

There were 15,678 households in the county, of which 22.6% had children under the age of 18 living with them and 24.7% had a female householder with no spouse or partner present. About 27.5% of all households were made up of individuals and 15.8% had someone living alone who was 65 years of age or older.

There were 18,805 housing units, of which 16.6% were vacant. Among occupied housing units, 75.7% were owner-occupied and 24.3% were renter-occupied. The homeowner vacancy rate was 2.2% and the rental vacancy rate was 6.3%.

30.8% of residents lived in urban areas, while 69.2% lived in rural areas.

The racial makeup of the county was 76.8% White, 3.1% Black or African American, 1.9% American Indian and Alaska Native, 1.4% Asian, 0.2% Native Hawaiian and Pacific Islander, 7.0% from some other race, and 9.6% from two or more races. Hispanic or Latino residents of any race comprised 14.9% of the population.

=== Racial and ethnic composition ===
Amador County, California – racial and ethnic composition Note: the US Census treats Hispanic/Latino as an ethnic category. This table excludes Latinos from the racial categories and assigns them to a separate category. Hispanics/Latinos may be of any race.
Race / ethnicity (NH = Non-Hispanic)	Pop 1980	Pop 1990	Pop 2000	Pop 2010	Pop 2020	% 1980	% 1990	% 2000	% 2010	% 2020
White alone (NH)	17,820	25,129	28,920	30,325	29,725	92.26%	83.65%	82.39%	79.61%	73.44%
Black or African American alone (NH)	151	1,670	1,348	938	1,215	0.78%	5.56%	3.84%	2.46%	3.00%
Native American or Alaska Native alone (NH)	336	461	538	547	577	1.74%	1.53%	1.53%	1.44%	1.43%
Asian alone (NH)	72	200	326	396	554	0.37%	0.67%	0.93%	1.04%	1.37%
Native Hawaiian or Pacific Islander alone (NH)	x	x	29	63	73	x	x	0.08%	0.17%	0.18%
Other race alone (NH)	18	59	178	130	249	0.09%	0.20%	0.51%	0.34%	0.62%
Mixed-race or multiracial (NH)	x	x	635	936	2,067	x	x	1.81%	2.46%	5.11%
Hispanic or Latino (any race)	917	2,520	3,126	4,756	6,014	4.75%	8.39%	8.91%	12.49%	14.86%
Total	19,314	30,039	35,100	38,091	40,474	100.00%	100.00%	100.00%	100.00%	100.00%

=== American Community Survey 2025 data ===
The United States Census Bureau estimated that in 2025, Amador County’s population was 41.876. It was also estimated that the county's population was 71,17% Non-Hispanic White, 17,57% Hispanic or Latino, 3,32% Non-Hispanic Black, 1,82% Asian, 1,34% Native American, 0,21% Pacific Islander, and 4,56% Multiracial.

Total	Population	Percentage
Non-Hispanic White	29.804	71,17%
Hispanic or Latino	7.358	17,57%
Non-Hispanic Black	1.390	3,32%
Asian	761	1,82%
Native American	562	1,34%
Pacific Islander	90	0,21%
Non-Hispanic Multiracial	1.911	4,56%

=== 2010 census ===
The 2010 United States census reported that Amador County had a population of 38,091. The racial makeup of Amador County was 33,149 (87.0%) White, 962 (2.5%) African American, 678 (1.8%) Native American, 419 (1.1%) Asian, 77 (0.2%) Pacific Islander, 1,450 (3.8%) from other races, and 1,356 (3.6%) from two or more races. Hispanic or Latino people of any race were 4,756 persons (12.5%).

Population reported at 2010 United States census
Place	Type	Total population	White	African American	Native American	Asian	Pacific Islander	Other races	Two or more races	Hispanic or Latino (of any race)
Amador County	County	38,091	33,149	962	678	419	77	1,450	1,356	4,756
Amador City	City	185	171	0	4	2	0	2	6	11
Ione	City	7,918	5,826	824	173	110	21	678	286	1,991
Jackson^{†}	City	4,651	4,090	32	94	60	4	185	186	520
Plymouth	City	1,005	850	3	18	6	2	70	56	183
Sutter Creek	City	2,501	2,272	10	34	65	5	40	75	219
Buckhorn	CDP	2,429	2,259	9	37	25	4	47	48	168
Buena Vista	CDP	429	365	1	23	0	0	12	28	35
Camanche North Shore	CDP	979	860	3	14	12	3	38	49	150
Camanche Village	CDP	847	762	0	9	8	4	31	33	121
Drytown	CDP	167	153	0	0	1	0	2	11	11
Fiddletown	CDP	235	215	0	5	1	0	8	6	22
Kirkwood^{‡}	CDP	61	59	0	1	1	0	0	0	2
Martell	CDP	282	234	0	14	0	5	14	15	36
Pine Grove	CDP	2,219	2,027	9	36	9	6	49	83	202
Pioneer	CDP	1,094	1,017	0	34	1	2	12	28	52
Red Corral	CDP	1,413	1,259	24	15	12	3	33	67	147
River Pines	CDP	379	324	0	5	4	0	8	38	31
Volcano	CDP	115	109	0	2	2	0	0	2	7
All others not CDPs (combined)	Others not CDPs	11,182	10,297	47	160	100	18	221	339	848

^{†} County seat
^{‡} Data for Amador County area of this CDP

=== 2000 census ===
As of the census of 2000, there were 35,100 people, 12,759 households, and 9,071 families residing in the county. The population density was 59 people per square mile (23 people/km^{2}). There were 15,035 housing units at an average density of 25 per square mile (9.7/km^{2}). The racial makeup of the county was 85.8% White, 3.9% Black or African American, 1.8% Native American, 1.0% Asian, 0.1% Pacific Islander, 5.0% from other races, and 2.4% from two or more races. 8.9% of the population were Hispanic or Latino of any race. 14.9% were of German, 12.6% English, 11.7% Irish, 8.8% Italian and 7.3% American ancestry according to Census 2000. 93.1% spoke English and 5.1% Spanish as their first language.

There were 12,759 households, out of which 26.2% had children under the age of 18 living with them, 58.9% were married couples living together, 8.7% had a female householder with no husband present, and 28.9% were non-families. 23.9% of all households were made up of individuals, and 11.3% had someone living alone who was 65 years of age or older. The average household size was 2.39 and the average family size was 2.81.

In the county, the population was spread out, with 20.6% under the age of 18, 6.9% from 18 to 24, 26.2% from 25 to 44, 28.3% from 45 to 64, and 18.0% who were 65 years of age or older. The median age was 43 years. For every 100 females there were 122.5 males. For every 100 females age 18 and over, there were 123.4 males.

The median income for a household in the county was $42,280, and the median income for a family was $51,226. Males had a median income of $39,697 versus $28,850 for females. The per capita income for the county was $22,412. About 6.1% of families and 9.2% of the population were below the poverty line, including 13.1% of those under age 18 and 5.4% of those age 65 or over.

== Economy ==
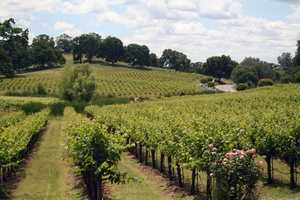
Amador Vineyard

The Shenandoah Valley was once the principal viticultural region of California, though not as well-known as the Napa Valley AVA or Sonoma Valley AVA viticultural regions. With the discovery of gold, the area quickly became a mecca for those trying to make their fortune. In the process, numerous wineries sprouted up, many of whose vineyards are still in use by wineries today. The decline of the California Gold Rush coupled with the onset of Prohibition devastated the wine-making region of Amador County.

Today this area has been resurrected and is now home to over 40 different wineries. Amador County is known for its Zinfandel, but many other varietals are produced as well. Amador County has a high percentage of old Zinfandel vines. Some of the Zinfandel vineyards in this county are more than 125 years old, including the original Grandpère vineyard, planted before 1869 and believed to be the oldest Zinfandel vineyard in America. This 10-acre (40,000 m^{2}) vineyard is home to some of the oldest Zinfandel vines on earth, with proof of their existence dating to 1869, when it was listed as a descriptor on a deed from the U.S. Geological Survey. A grant deed in Amador County records further proves their existence in 1869.

== Politics, government, and policing ==
=== County supervisors ===
The county is governed by a five-person elected Board of Supervisors and a County Administrator. The county seat is Jackson.

=== Policing ===
The unincorporated areas of Amador County are patrolled by the county sheriff's department, which also operates the county jail and protects the courts. Municipal police departments within the county are at Ione, Jackson, and Sutter Creek.

=== Voter registration statistics ===
Population and registered voters
Total eligible population	29,593	
Registered voters (Note: Percentage of registered voters with respect to total population. Percentages of party members with respect to registered voters follow.)	25,954	87.7%
Democratic	7,065	23.8%
Republican	12,251	41.3%
Democratic–Republican spread	-5,186	-16.5%
American Independent	1,427	4.8%
Libertarian	516	1.7%
Green	109	0.3%
Peace and Freedom	81	0.2%
Other	128	0.4%
Unknown	32	0.1%
No party preference	4,353	14.7%

==== Cities by population and voter registration ====
Cities by population and voter registration
City	Population	Registered voters	Democratic	Republican	D–R spread	Other	No party preference
Amador	158	83.5%	34.1%	41.7%	-7.6%	9.8%	18.2%
Ione	7,873	29.0%	27.3%	49.4%	-22.1%	11.4%	16.8%
Jackson	4,626	55.7%	32.3%	42.6%	-10.3%	11.2%	18.4%
Plymouth	1,055	49.4%	30.9%	38.8%	-7.9%	13.2%	22.5%
Sutter Creek	2,497	68.4%	35.9%	41.9%	-6.0%	9.6%	16.7%

=== Politics ===
United States presidential election results for Amador County, California
Year	Republican		Democratic		Third party(ies)	
Year	No.	%	No.	%	No.	%
1880	1,345	48.73%	1,411	51.12%	4	0.14%
1884	1,317	47.72%	1,358	49.20%	85	3.08%
1888	1,373	47.48%	1,429	49.41%	90	3.11%
1892	1,125	43.04%	1,255	48.01%	234	8.95%
1896	1,144	44.39%	1,398	54.25%	35	1.36%
1900	1,384	52.64%	1,209	45.99%	36	1.37%
1904	1,279	54.45%	915	38.95%	155	6.60%
1908	1,035	51.88%	874	43.81%	86	4.31%
1912	5	0.20%	1,622	64.80%	876	35.00%
1916	1,209	38.53%	1,766	56.28%	163	5.19%
1920	1,350	64.13%	639	30.36%	116	5.51%
1924	719	38.93%	316	17.11%	812	43.96%
1928	990	44.12%	1,246	55.53%	8	0.36%
1932	822	25.34%	2,367	72.97%	55	1.70%
1936	777	23.38%	2,506	75.41%	40	1.20%
1940	1,372	32.85%	2,762	66.14%	42	1.01%
1944	1,191	37.18%	1,976	61.69%	36	1.12%
1948	1,578	38.84%	2,334	57.45%	151	3.72%
1952	2,440	52.42%	2,169	46.60%	46	0.99%
1956	2,126	49.16%	2,181	50.43%	18	0.42%
1960	2,175	44.51%	2,690	55.04%	22	0.45%
1964	1,682	32.99%	3,410	66.89%	6	0.12%
1968	2,269	42.10%	2,440	45.27%	681	12.63%
1972	3,533	53.40%	2,705	40.89%	378	5.71%
1976	3,699	46.13%	4,037	50.35%	282	3.52%
1980	5,401	55.85%	3,191	33.00%	1,078	11.15%
1984	6,986	61.48%	4,188	36.86%	189	1.66%
1988	6,893	55.87%	5,197	42.12%	248	2.01%
1992	5,477	35.49%	5,286	34.25%	4,671	30.26%
1996	6,870	47.54%	5,868	40.60%	1,714	11.86%
2000	8,766	56.69%	5,906	38.19%	792	5.12%
2004	11,107	62.08%	6,541	36.56%	243	1.36%
2008	10,561	56.15%	7,813	41.54%	436	2.32%
2012	10,281	58.25%	6,830	38.70%	538	3.05%
2016	10,485	59.12%	6,004	33.86%	1,245	7.02%
2020	13,585	60.91%	8,153	36.55%	566	2.54%
2024	14,018	62.57%	7,783	34.74%	602	2.69%

== Crime ==
The following table includes the number of incidents reported and the rate per 1,000 persons for each type of offense.

Population and crime rates
Population	38,244	
Violent crime	107	2.80
Homicide	1	0.03
Forcible rape	10	0.26
Robbery	10	0.26
Aggravated assault	86	2.25
Property crime	537	14.04
Burglary	337	8.81
Larceny-theft (Note: Only larceny-theft cases involving property over $400 in value are reported as property crimes.)	459	12.00
Motor vehicle theft	60	1.57
Arson	2	0.05

=== Cities by population and crime rates ===
Cities by population and crime rates
City	Population	Violent crimes	Violent crime rate per 1,000 persons	Property crimes	Property crime rate per 1,000 persons
Ione	7,977	10	1.25	109	13.66
Jackson	4,677	38	8.12	136	29.08
Sutter Creek	2,513	7	2.79	62	24.67

== Education ==
There is one school district in Amador County: Amador County Unified School District.

Due to the low population of the area, there are few schools with small class sizes. In total for public schools, there are two high schools, two junior high schools, and six elementary schools. These numbers are in addition to two independent study schools, one charter school, and one continuing education school for adults. There are no colleges or universities within the county's borders.

== Transportation ==
=== Major highways ===
- State Route 16
- State Route 26
- State Route 49
- State Route 88
- State Route 104
- State Route 124

=== Public transportation ===
Amador Transit provides service in Jackson and nearby communities. Connections to Calaveras County and a daily commuter bus to/from Sacramento leave from the Sutter Hill Transit Center in Sutter Creek.

=== Airport ===
Amador County Airport is a general aviation airport located near Jackson.

== Communities ==
=== Cities ===
- Amador City
- Ione
- Jackson (county seat)
- Plymouth
- Sutter Creek

=== Unincorporated communities ===
- Amador Pines (Note: For statistical purposes, defined by the United States Census Bureau as a census-designated place (CDP).)
- Buckhorn
- Buena Vista
- Camanche North Shore
- Camanche Village
- Carbondale
- Clinton
- Drytown
- Enterprise
- Fiddletown
- Kirkwood
- Lockwood
- Martell
- New Chicago
- Pine Acres
- Pine Grove
- Pioneer
- Red Corral
- River Pines
- Roaring Camp
- Sutter Hill
- Volcano

== In popular culture ==
"The Luck of Roaring Camp" is a short story by American author Bret Harte. It was first published in the August 1868 issue of the Overland Monthly and helped push Harte to international prominence. Harte lived in this area during his "Gold Rush" period, and possibly based the story in a mining camp on the Mokelumne River.

The Gold Rush rock music festival took place at Lake Amador on October 4, 1969. Performers included Ike & Tina Turner, Santana, Bo Diddley, Albert Collins, and Taj Mahal.

== See also ==
- List of school districts in Amador County, California
- National Register of Historic Places listings in Amador County, California
- Amador High School
