= Lockwood, California =

There are two census-designated places in California named Lockwood:

- Lockwood, Amador County, California
- Lockwood, Monterey County, California

== See also ==
- Lockwood Valley, California, incorporated area in Ventura County
