= River Pines, California =

River Pines
- census-designated place
- Location in California
- Coordinates: 38°32′47″N 120°44′39″W
- Country: United States
- State: California
- County: Amador

Area
  - Total: 0.202 sq mi (0.524 km^{2})
  - Land: 0.202 sq mi (0.524 km^{2})
  - Water: 0 sq mi (0 km^{2}) 0%
- Elevation: 1,985 ft (605 m)

Population (2020)
  - Total: 390
  - Density: 1,900/sq mi (740/km^{2})
- ZIP Code: 95675
- Area code: 209
- GNIS feature IDs: 1659517; 2586445

River Pines is a census-designated place in Amador County, California, United States. It is located 3 miles (4.8 km) north-northeast of Fiddletown, at an elevation of 1985 feet (605 m). A post office opened at River Pines in 1948; it serves the zip code of 95675. River Pines has a population of 390 (2020 census).

== History ==
In the 1920s, the growing middle class looked for weekend or summer vacation property to buy a cabin amid the pines. Developers Roy and Helen Brooke found suitable land along the south fork of the Cosumnes in the Bridgeport district, and developed River Pines Resort to sell cabin sites.

By damming the river, the resort developed water activities and sports. With the resort thriving for a time, the Brookes subdivided more land for lots. In time, the resort became just another rural, remote community with a post office and store and much privacy.

By May 1926, Brooke had engaged Cassius M Phinney, surveyor and civil engineer, to subdivide some of the property bounded northerly by the Cosumnes River, and southerly by the Plymouth-Aukum county road.

== Demographics ==
Historical population
Census	Pop.	Note	%±
2010	379		—
2020	390		2.9%
U.S. Decennial Census; 2010

River Pines first appeared as a census designated place in the 2010 U.S. census.

The 2020 United States census reported that River Pines had a population of 390. The population density was 1,930.7 inhabitants per square mile (745.4/km^{2}). The racial makeup of River Pines was 84.1% White, 0.5% African American, 3.1% Native American, 1.5% Asian, 0.3% Pacific Islander, 4.6% from other races, and 5.9% from two or more races. Hispanic or Latino of any race were 8.7% of the population.

There were 163 households, out of which 20.9% included children under the age of 18, 34.4% were married-couple households, 8.6% were cohabiting couple households, 19.6% had a female householder with no partner present, and 37.4% had a male householder with no partner present. 33.1% of households were one person, and 19.6% were one person aged 65 or older. The average household size was 2.39. There were 88 families (54.0% of all households).

The age distribution was 22.1% under the age of 18, 2.3% aged 18 to 24, 19.2% aged 25 to 44, 32.1% aged 45 to 64, and 24.4% who were 65 years of age or older. The median age was 53.8 years. For every 100 females, there were 90.2 males.

There were 199 housing units at an average density of 985.1 units per square mile (380.3 units/km^{2}), of which 163 (81.9%) were occupied. Of these, 77.9% were owner-occupied, and 22.1% were occupied by renters.
