= Enterprise, Amador County, California =

Unincorporated community in California, United States

Enterprise
- Unincorporated community
- Location in California Enterprise (the United States)
- Coordinates: 38°32′25″N 120°50′50″W
- Country: United States
- State: California
- County: Amador
- Elevation: 876 ft (267 m)

Enterprise is a former mining camp in Amador County, California, United States. It is located 5.5 miles (8.9 km) west-northwest of Fiddletown, on Big Indian Creek, at an elevation of 876 feet (267 m). Established to mine quartz, at its peak it had a population of approximately one hundred, but the prospects did not pan out, and there are only a few houses in the area now.
