= Amador Pines, California =

- Unincorporated community Census-designated place
- Location within California Location within the United States
- Coordinates: 38°29′27″N 120°31′55″W
- Country: United States
- State: California
- County: Amador

Area
  - Total: 4.85 sq mi (12.56 km^{2})
  - Land: 4.85 sq mi (12.56 km^{2})
  - Water: 0 sq mi (0.00 km^{2}) 0%
- Elevation: 3,668 ft (1,118 m)

Population (2020)
  - Total: 1,118
  - Density: 230/sq mi (89/km^{2})
- Time zone: UTC-8 (Pacific (PST))
  - Summer (DST): UTC-7 (PDT)
- ZIP Code: 95666 (Pioneer)
- Area code: 209
- FIPS code: 06-01518
- GNIS feature ID: 2812655

Amador Pines is an unincorporated community and census-designated place (CDP) in Amador County, California, United States. It is located along California State Route 88, bordered to the south by Buckhorn and to the west by Lockwood. The Census Bureau first designated it as a CDP prior to the 2020 census for statistical purposes. As of the 2020 census, Amador Pines had a population of 1,118.

== Demographics ==
Historical population
Census	Pop.	Note	%±
2020	1,118		—
U.S. Decennial Census; 1860–1870 1880-1890; 1900 1910 1920; 1930 1940 1950; 1960 1970 1980; 1990 2000 2010; 2020

Amador Pines first appeared as a census designated place in the 2020 U.S. census.

=== 2020 census ===
As of the 2020 census, Amador Pines had a population of 1,118. The median age was 61.6 years. 10.9% of residents were under the age of 18 and 39.9% of residents were 65 years of age or older. For every 100 females there were 96.8 males, and for every 100 females age 18 and over there were 94.5 males age 18 and over.

0.0% of residents lived in urban areas, while 100.0% lived in rural areas.

There were 529 households in Amador Pines, of which 18.1% had children under the age of 18 living in them. Of all households, 61.4% were married-couple households, 19.5% were households with a male householder and no spouse or partner present, and 13.2% were households with a female householder and no spouse or partner present. About 24.6% of all households were made up of individuals and 13.8% had someone living alone who was 65 years of age or older.

There were 864 housing units, of which 38.8% were vacant. The homeowner vacancy rate was 3.5% and the rental vacancy rate was 3.7%.

Amador Pines CDP, California – Racial and ethnic composition Note: the US Census treats Hispanic/Latino as an ethnic category. This table excludes Latinos from the racial categories and assigns them to a separate category. Hispanics/Latinos may be of any race.
Race / Ethnicity (NH = Non-Hispanic)	Pop 2020	% 2020
White alone (NH)	950	84.87%
Black or African American alone (NH)	3	0.27%
Native American or Alaska Native alone (NH)	16	1.43%
Asian alone (NH)	10	0.89%
Pacific Islander alone (NH)	3	0.27%
Other race alone (NH)	0	0.00%
Mixed race or Multiracial (NH)	45	4.03%
Hispanic or Latino (any race)	91	8.14%
Total	1,118	100.00%
