= Jackson Creek (Dry Creek tributary) =

Location
- Country: United States
- State: California
- County: Amador

Physical characteristics
- Source
  - coordinates: 38°24′35″N 120°39′25″W
- Mouth: Dry Creek
  - location: about 6 miles (9.7 km) southwest of Ione
  - coordinates: 38°17′57″N 121°0′47″W
  - elevation: 184 ft (56 m)

Jackson Creek is a 26.4-mile-long (42.5 km) stream in the Sierra Nevada foothills and Amador County, California.

== Geography ==
It is a tributary of Dry Creek, which is a tributary of the Mokelumne River. It is located southwest of Ione. The creek was linked to placer gold mining during the California Gold Rush era.

Jackson Creek is dammed to create Lake Amador using a 193-foot (59 m) high earth and rock construction. The dam was constructed in 1965.

== Ecology ==
Tree cover in much of the watershed approaches 80 percent, with dominant tree species including Interior Live Oak, Quercus wislizinii, Black Oak, Quercus kellogii, Blue Oak, Quercus douglasiiigger, Gray Pine Pinus sabiniana, Ponderosa Pine, Pinus ponderosa, Oregon Ash, Fraxinus latifolia and California Buckeye, Aesculus californica.

== See also ==
- Gold panning
- Jackson, California
- Sutter Creek
