= Gold Rush (music festival) =

- Genre: Rock, folk, soul, blues
- Dates: October 4–5, 1969
- Location: Amador County, California
- Years active: 1969
- Attendance: 40,000–50,000

Gold Rush was a music festival held at Lake Amador in Amador County, California, on October 4, 1969. The festival was sponsored and promoted by music manager Robert Strand, disc jockey Gene Lane, and professor James Davis.

== Overview ==
There were concerns that the festival would cause a disruption in the area. Residents of the nearby cities Ione, California and Jackson, California were "shook up' about the prospects of hosting hordes of rock music enthusiasts." According to The Sun-Telegram, "one county official wanted to short circuit the festival by cutting off the electricity to the site, but he was overruled by the board for supervisors."

Dr. James Davis, a professor of botany at San Joaquin Delta College in Stockton, California, and his students built a bandstand and concession both to be used for the festival. The proceeds of the festival went to Project Costa Rica, a nonprofit education venture headed by Dr. David. He took his students to Costa Rica each year for science research projects.

Davis named the festival "Gold Rush" after the gold mining past of Amador County.

Although drugs were prevalent and some concertgoers went skinny dipping in the lake, no arrests were made. Amador County officials said the thousands of people, many of whom had camped out for days, were "completely peaceful and law-abiding."

Tickets for the event cost $3 in advance and $3.50 at the gate. An estimated 40,000-50,000 people attended the festival which was held at a 40-acre site near Lake Amador. The music began at 9 a.m. on Saturday, October 4, and ended at 2 a.m. on Sunday, October 5. Davis estimated that the festival grossed only $32,450 due to greedy gate guards and dishonest people posing as ticket takers.

== Performers ==
The event was advertised as a rock music festival but there were blues, soul, and folk musicians in the lineup as well.

List of performers:

- Santana
- Ike & Tina Turner
- Taj Mahal
- Bo Diddley
- Albert Collins
- Kaleidoscope
- Al Wilson
- Southwind
- Sons of Champlin
- Country Weather
- Cold Blood
- John Fahey
- Linn County
- Daybreak

== See also ==
- List of music festivals
- List of historic rock festivals
