= New Chicago, California =

Unincorporated community in California, United States

New Chicago
- Unincorporated community
- Location in California New Chicago (the United States)
- Coordinates: 38°26′14″N 120°50′11″W
- Country: United States
- State: California
- County: Amador
- Elevation: 948 ft (289 m)

Population (2016)
  - Total: 25

New Chicago (formerly, Chicago) is an unincorporated community in Amador County, California, United States. It is located 3 miles (4.8 km) south of Plymouth, at an elevation of 948 feet (289 m). In 1888, New Chicago was described as "only a mining camp" with a population of 150. A few residences remain in the area today.
