= Amador County Airport =

Amador County Airport Westover Field
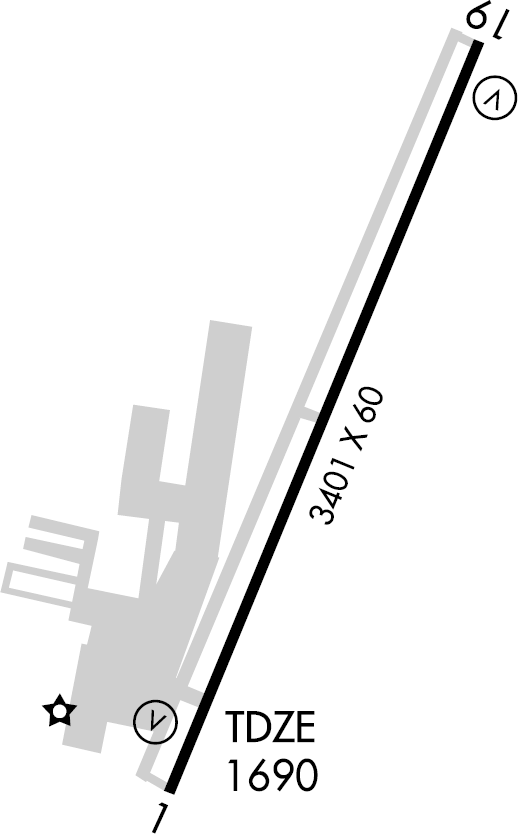
- IATA: none; ICAO: KJAQ; FAA LID: JAQ

Summary
- Airport type: Public
- Owner: County of Amador
- Serves: Jackson, California
- Elevation AMSL: 1,690 ft (520 m)
- Coordinates: 38°22′36″N 120°47′38″W
- Interactive map of Amador County Airport

Runways
Direction	Length		Surface
Direction	ft	m	Surface
1/19	3,401	1,037	Asphalt

Statistics (1997)
- Aircraft operations: 25,000
- Based aircraft: 89
- Source: Federal Aviation Administration

Amador County Airport (ICAO: KJAQ, FAA LID: JAQ, formerly O70), also known as Westover Field, is a county-owned public-use airport in Amador County, California, United States. It is located two nautical miles (3.7 km) northwest of the central business district of Jackson, California. The airport is mostly used for general aviation.

Although many U.S. airports use the same three-letter location identifier for the FAA and IATA, this facility is assigned JAQ by the FAA but has no designation from the IATA (which assigned JAQ to Jacquinot Bay Airport in Papua New Guinea).

== Facilities and aircraft ==
Amador County Airport covers an area of 110 acres (45 ha) at an elevation of 1,690 feet (515 m) above mean sea level. It has one runway designated 1/19 with an asphalt surface measuring 3,401 by 60 feet (1,037 x 18 m).

For the 12-month period ending October 1, 1997, the airport had 25,000 aircraft operations, an average of 68 per day: 99% general aviation, <1% air taxi, and <1% military. At that time there were 89 aircraft based at this airport: 88% single-engine, 5% multi-engine, 3% helicopter and 5% ultralight.
