= Dry Creek (Mokelumne River tributary) =

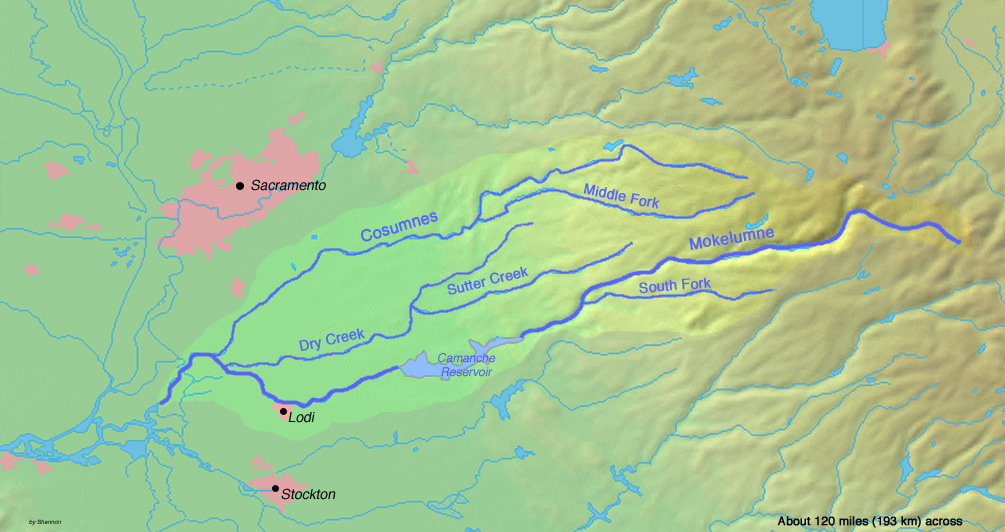
- Map of the Mokelumne River watershed

Location
- Country: United States
- State: California
- Region: Amador County, Sacramento County, San Joaquin County

Physical characteristics
- Source
  - coordinates: 38°28′13″N 120°48′40″W
- Mouth: Mokelumne River
  - location: California, United States
  - coordinates: 38°13′55″N 121°24′42″W
  - elevation: 13 ft (4.0 m)

Dry Creek is a 47.1-mile-long (75.8 km) stream in northern California which runs from the Sierra Nevada to the Mokelumne River west of Galt.

== Tributaries ==
- North Fork Dry Creek
- South Fork Dry Creek
- Sutter Creek
- Jackson Creek

== See also ==
- Borden Ranch AVA
- List of rivers of California
