= Camanche North Shore, California =

Camanche North Shore
- census-designated place
- Location of Camanche North Shore in Amador County, California.

- Position in California.
- Coordinates: 38°14′40″N 120°57′14″W
- Country: United States
- State: California
- County: Amador

Area
  - Total: 2.33 sq mi (6.04 km^{2})
  - Land: 2.33 sq mi (6.04 km^{2})
  - Water: 0 sq mi (0.00 km^{2}) 0%
- Elevation: 308 ft (94 m)

Population (2020)
  - Total: 1,070
  - Density: 458.9/sq mi (177.18/km^{2})
- Time zone: UTC-8 (Pacific (PST))
  - Summer (DST): UTC-7 (PDT)
- GNIS feature ID: 2582959

Camanche North Shore is a census-designated place in Amador County, California, United States. Camanche North Shore sits at an elevation of 308 feet (94 m). The 2020 United States census reported Camanche North Shore's population was 1,070.

== Demographics ==
Historical population
Census	Pop.	Note	%±
2010	979		—
2020	1,070		9.3%
U.S. Decennial Census; 1860–1870 1880-1890; 1900 1910 1920; 1930 1940 1950; 1960 1970 1980; 1990 2000 2010

Camanche North Shore first appeared as a census designated place in the 2010 U.S. census.

=== 2020 census ===
As of the 2020 census, Camanche North Shore had a population of 1,070. The population density was 460.8 inhabitants per square mile (177.9/km^{2}). The median age was 41.0 years. The age distribution was 24.1% under the age of 18, 5.2% aged 18 to 24, 24.8% aged 25 to 44, 27.1% aged 45 to 64, and 18.8% who were 65 years of age or older. For every 100 females, there were 109.4 males, and for every 100 females age 18 and over, there were 102.5 males age 18 and over.

The Census reported that 99.2% of the population lived in households, 0.8% lived in non-institutionalized group quarters, and none were institutionalized. 0.0% of residents lived in urban areas, while 100.0% lived in rural areas.

There were 393 households, out of which 27.5% had children under the age of 18. Of all households, 57.3% were married-couple households, 7.1% were cohabiting couple households, 20.1% had a female householder with no spouse or partner present, and 15.5% had a male householder with no spouse or partner present. About 18.6% of all households were one person, and 10.7% were one person aged 65 or older. The average household size was 2.7. There were 287 families (73.0% of all households).

There were 456 housing units at an average density of 196.4 units per square mile (75.8 units/km^{2}), of which 393 (86.2%) were occupied. Of these, 80.7% were owner-occupied, and 19.3% were occupied by renters. Of all housing units, 13.8% were vacant. The homeowner vacancy rate was 1.2% and the rental vacancy rate was 13.3%.

Racial composition as of the 2020 census
Race	Number	Percent
White	863	80.7%
Black or African American	12	1.1%
American Indian and Alaska Native	16	1.5%
Asian	21	2.0%
Native Hawaiian and Other Pacific Islander	2	0.2%
Some other race	44	4.1%
Two or more races	112	10.5%
Hispanic or Latino (of any race)	150	14.0%
