= Red Corral, California =

Red Corral
- census-designated place
- Position in California.
- Coordinates: 38°24′42″N 120°36′20″W
- Country: United States
- State: California
- County: Amador

Area
  - Total: 6.303 sq mi (16.324 km^{2})
  - Land: 6.303 sq mi (16.324 km^{2})
  - Water: 0 sq mi (0 km^{2}) 0%
- Elevation: 2,710 ft (830 m)

Population (2020)
  - Total: 1,687
  - Density: 267.7/sq mi (103.3/km^{2})
- Time zone: UTC-8 (Pacific (PST))
  - Summer (DST): UTC-7 (PDT)
- GNIS feature ID: 2583119

Red Corral is a census-designated place in Amador County, California, United States. Red Corral sits at an elevation of 2710 feet (826 m). The 2020 United States census reported Red Corral's population as 1,687.

== Demographics ==
Historical population
Census	Pop.	Note	%±
2010	1,413		—
2020	1,687		19.4%
U.S. Decennial Census; 2010

=== 2020 census ===
As of the 2020 census, Red Corral had a population of 1,687. The population density was 267.7 inhabitants per square mile (103.4/km^{2}). The median age was 50.9 years. The age distribution was 17.2% under the age of 18, 10.1% aged 18 to 24, 17.9% aged 25 to 44, 23.3% aged 45 to 64, and 31.4% who were 65 years of age or older. For every 100 females, there were 91.3 males, and for every 100 females age 18 and over there were 98.6 males age 18 and over. 0.0% of residents lived in urban areas, while 100.0% lived in rural areas.

The Census reported that 95.8% of the population lived in households, 4.1% lived in non-institutionalized group quarters, and 0.1% were institutionalized.

There were 655 households in Red Corral, of which 25.8% had children under the age of 18 living in them. Of all households, 49.5% were married-couple households, 8.5% were cohabiting couple households, 17.1% were households with a male householder and no spouse or partner present, and 24.9% were households with a female householder and no spouse or partner present. About 25.6% of all households were made up of individuals and 12.7% had someone living alone who was 65 years of age or older. The average household size was 2.47. There were 430 families (65.6% of all households).

There were 772 housing units at an average density of 122.5 units per square mile (47.3 units/km^{2}), of which 655 (84.8%) were occupied. Of occupied units, 75.9% were owner-occupied and 24.1% were occupied by renters. The remaining 15.2% of housing units were vacant. The homeowner vacancy rate was 2.0% and the rental vacancy rate was 0.0%.

Racial composition as of the 2020 census
Race	Number	Percent
White	1,373	81.4%
Black or African American	28	1.7%
American Indian and Alaska Native	25	1.5%
Asian	18	1.1%
Native Hawaiian and Other Pacific Islander	4	0.2%
Some other race	87	5.2%
Two or more races	152	9.0%
Hispanic or Latino (of any race)	179	10.6%

=== 2010 census ===
Red Corral first appeared as a census designated place in the 2010 U.S. census.
