= Lake Amador =

- Location within California Location within the United States
- Location: Amador County, California
- Coordinates: 38°18′12″N 120°53′22″W
- Type: Reservoir
- Primary outflows: Jackson Creek
- Catchment area: 58 sq mi (150 km^{2})
- Basin countries: United States
- Built: 1965; 61 years ago
- Surface area: 385 acres (156 ha)
- Water volume: 22,000 acre-feet (27,000,000 m^{3})
- Surface elevation: 325 feet (99 m)

Lake Amador is a reservoir located in Amador County, California. It lies at an elevation of 325 feet.

The lake's water is impounded by the Jackson Creek Dam, a 193-foot (59 m) tall earth-and-rock dam, built in 1965 across Jackson Creek. The dam is 1,140 feet (350 m) long and 11 feet (3.4 m) wide and contains 1,223,000 cubic yards (935,000 m^{3}) of material. Its crest is 481 feet (147 m) about sea level, and it belongs to the Jackson Valley Irrigation District. The reservoir's capacity is 22,000 acre-feet (27,000,000 m^{3}).

Lake Amador was the site of the Gold Rush rock music festival on October 4, 1969. Performers included Ike & Tina Turner, Santana, Bo Diddley, Albert Collins, and Taj Mahal.

== See also ==
- List of lakes in California
- List of reservoirs and dams in California
