= Pine Acres, California =

Unincorporated community in California, United States

Pine Acres
- Unincorporated community
- Location in California Pine Acres (the United States)
- Coordinates: 38°23′46″N 120°38′37″W
- Country: United States
- State: California
- County: Amador
- Elevation: 2,684 ft (818 m)

Pine Acres is an unincorporated community in Amador County, California, United States. It lies at an elevation of 2684 feet (818 m).
