= Lower Bear River Reservoir =

Coordinates: 38.542°N 120.238°W

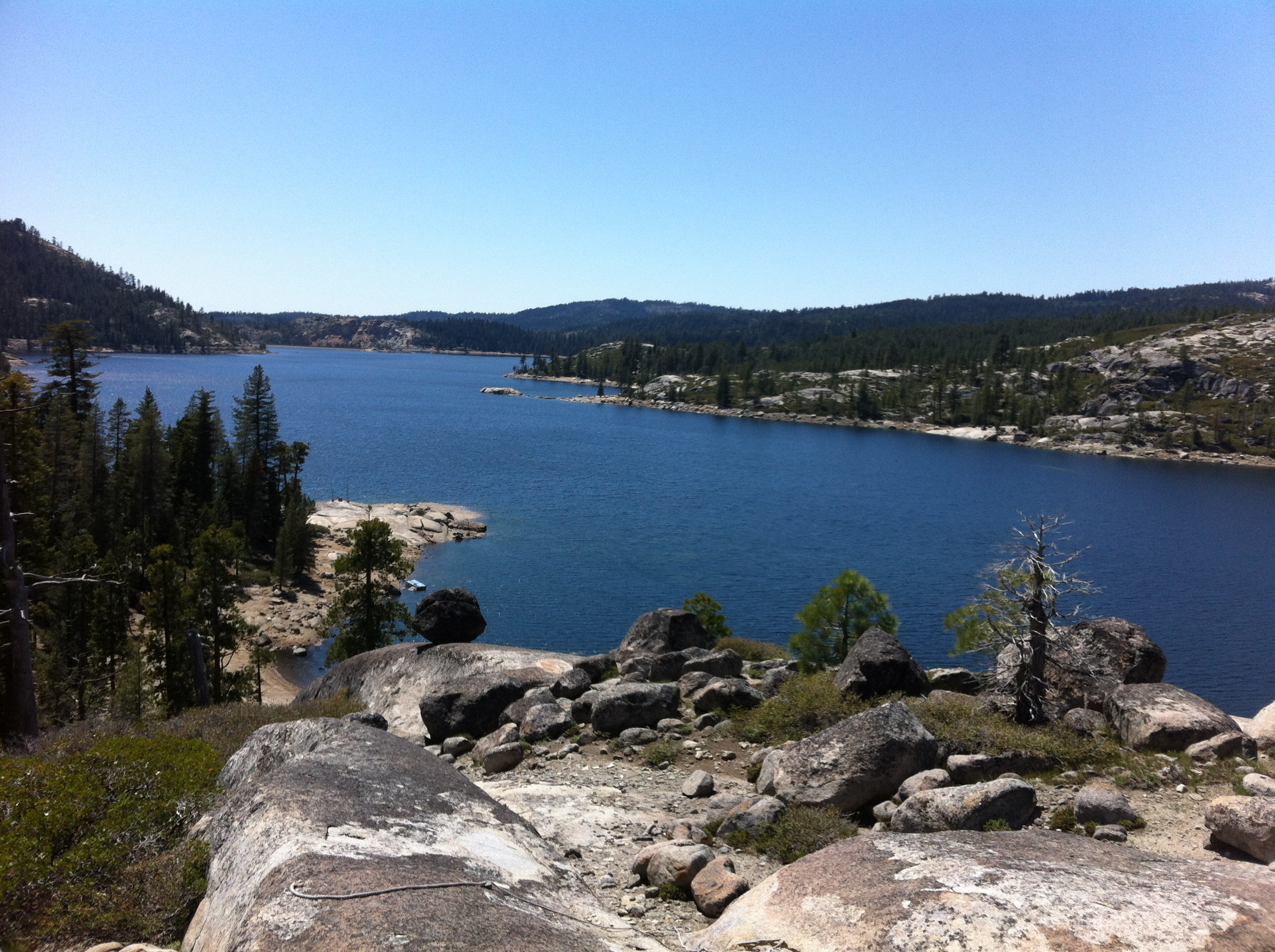

- Location in California
- Location: Pioneer, California
- Type: Reservoir
- Basin countries: United States
- Surface area: 727 acres (294 ha)

Lower Bear River Reservoir in Pioneer, California, is created by its own dam, the Lower Bear River Reservoir Dam, and is owned by PG&E. The reservoir lies at 5,800 feet above sea level and covers 727 acres.

Unlike the Upper Bear River Reservoir, Lower Bear River Reservoir is vehicle-accessible, thus making it primarily used in the summer for recreation. The Bear River Lake Resort on the northwestern shore offers fishing, camping and boating. On the north shore, built into the cliffs, is Camp Ritchie, used as a summer camp and owned by the Church of Jesus Christ of Latter-day Saints. On the south shore lies Camp Winton, a summer camp of the Boy Scouts of America.
