= Lockwood, Amador County, California =

Lockwood
- Unincorporated community Census-designated place
- Location within California Location within the United States
- Coordinates: 38°29′12″N 120°36′12″W
- Country: United States
- State: California
- County: Amador

Area
  - Total: 5.44 sq mi (14.08 km^{2})
  - Land: 5.44 sq mi (14.08 km^{2})
  - Water: 0 sq mi (0 km^{2}) 0%
- Elevation: 3,068 ft (935 m)

Population (2020)
  - Total: 495
  - Density: 91.1/sq mi (35.2/km^{2})
- Time zone: UTC-8 (Pacific (PST))
  - Summer (DST): UTC-7 (PDT)
- ZIP Code: 95689 (Volcano)
- Area code: 209
- FIPS code: 06-42142
- GNIS feature ID: 2812656

Lockwood is an unincorporated community and census-designated place (CDP) in Amador County, California, United States. It is located north of Volcano and west of Amador Pines.

== Demographics ==
Historical population
| Census | Pop. | Note | %± |
|---|---|---|---|
| 2020 | 495 | | — |
U.S. Decennial Census; 1850–1870 1880-1890; 1900 1910 1920; 1930 1940 1950; 1960 1970 1980; 1990 2000 2010; 2020

Lockwood first appeared as a census designated place in the 2020 U.S. census.

=== 2020 Census ===
Lockwood CDP (Amador County), California – Racial and ethnic composition Note: the US Census treats Hispanic/Latino as an ethnic category. This table excludes Latinos from the racial categories and assigns them to a separate category. Hispanics/Latinos may be of any race.
| Race / Ethnicity (NH = Non-Hispanic) | Pop 2020 | % 2020 |
|---|---|---|
| White alone (NH) | 390 | 78.79% |
| Black or African American alone (NH) | 2 | 0.40% |
| Native American or Alaska Native alone (NH) | 4 | 0.81% |
| Asian alone (NH) | 6 | 1.21% |
| Pacific Islander alone (NH) | 0 | 0.00% |
| Other race alone (NH) | 3 | 0.61% |
| Mixed race or Multiracial (NH) | 45 | 9.09% |
| Hispanic or Latino (any race) | 45 | 9.09% |
| Total | 495 | 100.00% |
