= Fiddletown, California =

Fiddletown
- Census designated place
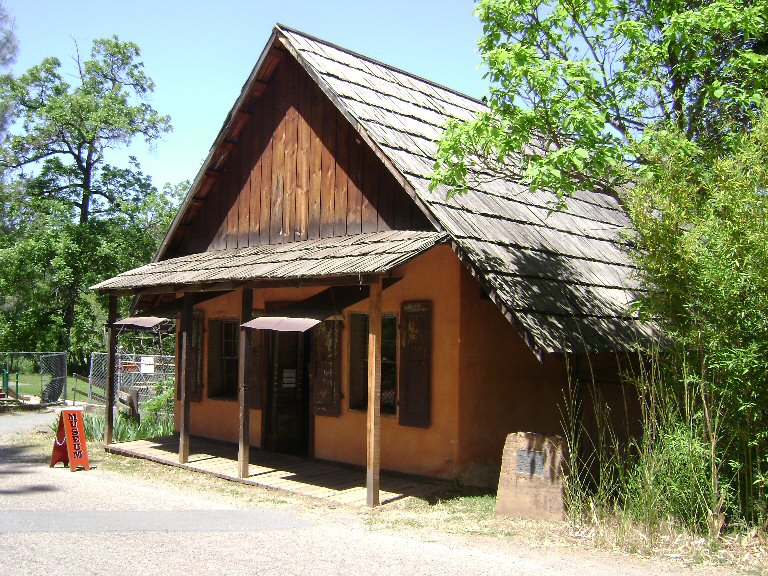
- The Chew Kee Chinese Apothecary (historic rammed-earth structure) in Fiddletown

- Location in California
- Coordinates: 38°30′14″N 120°45′20″W
- Country: United States
- State: California
- County: Amador
- Settled: 1849

Area
  - Total: 4.555 sq mi (11.797 km^{2})
  - Land: 4.555 sq mi (11.797 km^{2})
  - Water: 0 sq mi (0 km^{2}) 0%
- Elevation: 1,683 ft (513 m)

Population (2020)
  - Total: 279
  - Density: 61.3/sq mi (23.7/km^{2})
- ZIP code: 95629
- Area code: 209
- FIPS code: 06-23980
- GNIS feature IDs: 223482, 2583012
- Fiddletown
- U.S. National Register of Historic Places
- U.S. Historic district
- California Historical Landmark
- NRHP reference No.: 78000655
- CHISL No.: 35

Significant dates
- Added to NRHP: June 7, 1978
- Designated CHISL: 1932

Fiddletown (from 1878 to 1932, Oleta) is a census-designated place in Amador County, California, United States. The town is registered as a California Historical Landmark and is listed in the National Register of Historic Places. Fiddletown's population was 279 at the 2020 census.

== History ==
The town was first settled in 1849 reportedly by settlers from Missouri though no historical records have survived which confirm this. The earliest settlement was largely populated by transient miners living in tents or wooden sheds, though Fiddletown grew rapidly in 1852 when gold was discovered in the dry riverbeds of the surrounding area. A 22-mile canal was completed in 1853 which diverted the Cosumnes River and brought water to these riverbeds so that miners could pan for gold. This water source also supplied irrigation for local agriculture which further spurred the establishment of a permanent town. By 1854 the town reportedly had over 2000 residents.

During the 1850s the town began to develop a cohesive community with a number of community buildings and fraternal orders being founded. The first church was completed in 1853, and that same year the United States Postal Service opened a Fiddletown post office. As more families began to populate the town, the first school began accepting students around 1855. These community buildings were matched by community organizing with a number of fraternal organizations being established. One of the earliest was a division of the Sons of Temperance, founded to combat alcoholism and what one then-resident referred to as the "desecrating hand of vice [which] steals upon our citizens in the shape of Chinese and other prostitutes who have been driven from the cities". A Jewish Society was formed in 1857 around the same time that a synagogue was established in the now county seat of Jackson, California. The Free Masons formed a lodge that same year, and in 1859 a lodge of Odd Fellows was established.

At the time of its founding, placer mining was the most popular mining technique, which is heavily dependent on water. The local water source, Dry Creek, ran dry during the summer months, during which time the miners were said to be "fiddling around," thus the name. Alternatively, the name was given because many of the early settlers from Missouri played fiddles for entertainment. However, one local citizen was embarrassed to be known as the "Man from Fiddletown" and successfully lobbied to have the name changed to Oleta (after his daughter) in 1878. The old name was restored in 1932.

== Geography ==
=== Climate ===
According to the Köppen Climate Classification system, Fiddletown has a warm-summer Mediterranean climate, abbreviated "Csb" on climate maps.

== Demographics ==
Historical population
Census	Pop.	Note	%±
2010	235		—
2020	279		18.7%
U.S. Decennial Census; 2010

Fiddletown first appeared as a census designated place in the 2010 U.S. census.

The 2020 United States census reported that Fiddletown had a population of 279. The population density was 61.3 inhabitants per square mile (23.7/km^{2}). The racial makeup of Fiddletown was 84.6% White, 0.0% African American, 0.4% Native American, 0.7% Asian, 0.0% Pacific Islander, 4.7% from other races, and 9.7% from two or more races. Hispanic or Latino of any race were 14.3% of the population.

There were 120 households, out of which 26.7% included children under the age of 18, 65.8% were married-couple households, 6.7% were cohabiting couple households, 12.5% had a female householder with no partner present, and 15.0% had a male householder with no partner present. 17.5% of households were one person, and 7.5% were one person aged 65 or older. The average household size was 2.33. There were 92 families (76.7% of all households).

The age distribution was 15.8% under the age of 18, 5.4% aged 18 to 24, 15.8% aged 25 to 44, 28.0% aged 45 to 64, and 35.1% who were 65 years of age or older. The median age was 57.1 years. For every 100 females, there were 80.0 males.

There were 154 housing units at an average density of 33.8 units per square mile (13.1 units/km^{2}), of which 120 (77.9%) were occupied. Of these, 80.8% were owner-occupied, and 19.2% were occupied by renters.

== Government ==
In the state legislature Fiddletown is in the 4th senatorial district, represented by Republican Marie Alvarado-Gil, and the 1st Assembly district, represented by Republican Heather Hadwick. Federally, Fiddletown is in California's 5th congressional district, represented by Republican Tom McClintock.
