= Argonaut Mine =

Gold mine in California, United States

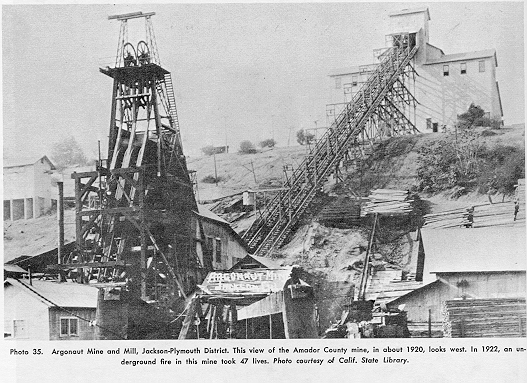
- Argonaut Mine and Mill, c. 1920

- Location within California Location within the United States
- 38.364717°N 120.7871°W
- Location: State Route 49, Jackson, California

California Historical Landmark
- Reference no.: 786

The Argonaut Mine was a gold mine in Jackson, California, United States. The deposit was discovered in 1850, and in 1922 was the site of the worst gold-mining disaster in the state's history. The mine closed in 1942 and, along with the nearby Kennedy Mine, is registered as California Historical Landmark #786.

The gold deposit was discovered in the 1850s by two miners, James Hager and William Tudor, both freed slaves. Serious development began in 1893 when it was purchased by the Argonaut Mining Company. The mine operated until 1942 reaching a vertical depth of 5,570 feet (1,700 m) via a 63-degree shaft and produced more than $25 million (~$378 million in 2024) in gold.

== Mine collapse ==
On August 27, 1922, 47 miners, mostly immigrants from Italy, Spain, and Serbia, were trapped 4,650 feet (1,420 m) below ground when a fire broke out. Other miners who had been near the surface poured water down the shaft in an attempt to put out the flames. By dawn, townspeople and other miners arrived to help, but it took two-and-a-half days for the fire to be extinguished.

Rescuers began re-opening tunnels from the Kennedy Mine which had been closed since an earlier fire in 1919. They were proceeding slowly, but hopes remained high until September 18, when a canary inserted beyond a bulkhead by oxygen-tank-equipped workers died. It took three weeks to reach the level at which the miners were trapped. No one survived and evidence indicated that they had all died within hours of the fire breaking out. One of the bodies was not recovered until a year later.

It was determined that the mine had violated safety regulations, but the owners escaped punishment, as the United States Bureau of Mines had little enforcement power. The exact cause of the fire was never determined, but it was said to be "incendiarism" (a broad term meaning either arson or defective wiring).

== Listing as Superfund Site ==
The mine in Jackson may be the first mining site in the Sierra Nevada Motherlode to be listed as an EPA Superfund Site. Mine tailings and waste from ore processing left a million cubic yards of material tainted with arsenic, lead and mercury within the limits of the city of Jackson. Single family homes and part of the Jackson high school were built on waste rock piles from the mine. Other waste from the mine is being held back by the Eastwood Multiple Arch Dam, which the EPA says is at risk of failure.

There are no commercial organizations responsible for mining still in existence to be held responsible for the mine cleanup. When the mine is listed on a Superfund site the mine will be eligible for federal cleanup funds.

== In popular culture ==
Argonaut High School located in Jackson, California is named after the mine.

Ghost Adventures visited the mine to investigate possible paranormal activity.

Ghost Hunters investigated the mine to determine if the claims of paranormal activity had any validity.

== See also ==
- List of environmental disasters
- Smith Mine disaster
- Saint Sava Serbian Orthodox Church (Jackson, California)
- Monongah mining disaster
