= Kennedy Gold Mine =

Coordinates: 38°22′2″N 120°46′45″W

- Kennedy Tailing Wheels
- U.S. National Register of Historic Places
- California Historical Landmark
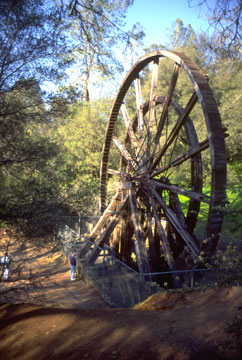
- Kennedy mining wheel

- Location within California Location within the United States
- Location: Jackson, California
- Built: 1914
- Architect: James Spears
- NRHP reference No.: 08001347
- CHISL No.: 786
- Added to NRHP: July 7, 1981

The Kennedy Gold Mine is a gold mine in Jackson, California, one of the deepest mines on the Mother Lode. It closed in 1942 and together with nearby Argonaut Mine, is registered as California Historical Landmark No. 786. It has since been re-opened as a tourist attraction.

The mine is named for Andrew Kennedy, an Irish immigrant, who reportedly discovered a quartz outcropping in the late 1850s near what is now State Route 49. The Kennedy Mining Company was formed in 1860 when he and three partners began digging shafts near today's mine property entrance. The mine operated sporadically until it closed in 1878. In 1886 fifteen people invested $97,600 (~$3 million in 2024) to reopen the mine under the corporate entity of the Kennedy Mining and Milling Company.

In 1898 the company began sinking a new shaft 1,950 feet (591 m) east of the original shafts. This East Shaft would eventually reach a vertical depth of 5,912 feet (1,792 m), the deepest vertical depth gold mine in North America at the time. In 1928 a surface fire burned all the structures except two. All other buildings and foundations were built after 1928. The company operated the mine until 1942 when the U.S. Government closed gold mines because of the war effort.

On August 27, 1922, when forty-seven miners were trapped by fire in the nearby Argonaut Mine 4,650 feet (1,409 m) below ground, rescue efforts were launched from the Kennedy Mine to connect the tunnels of the two mines. Unfortunately progress was slow and rescuers arrived too late to save the miners in the Argonaut.

At the time of its closing, the mine had produced some $34.3 million (according to the California Department of Conservation) when gold was valued at $20.67 and $35.00 per ounce. The company paid its stockholders $5.8 million between 1886 and 1937. Over 95% of these dividends were paid at $20.67 per ounce.
