= Buckhorn, Amador County, California =

Buckhorn
- census-designated place
- Position in California.
- Coordinates: 38°27′11″N 120°32′08″W
- Country: United States
- State: California
- County: Amador

Area
  - Total: 4.93 sq mi (12.77 km^{2})
  - Land: 4.93 sq mi (12.77 km^{2})
  - Water: 0 sq mi (0.00 km^{2}) 0%
- Elevation: 3,238 ft (987 m)

Population (2020)
  - Total: 2,597
  - Density: 526.6/sq mi (203.33/km^{2})
- Time zone: UTC-8 (Pacific (PST))
  - Summer (DST): UTC-7 (PDT)
- ZIP Code: 95666
- Area code: 209
- FIPS code: 06-08680
- GNIS feature IDs: 2586444, 2652372

Buckhorn is a census-designated place in Amador County, California, United States. Buckhorn sits at an elevation of 3,238 feet (987 m). The community is served by ZIP code 95666 and area code 209. The 2020 United States census reported Buckhorn's population as 2,597.

== Demographics ==
Historical population
Census	Pop.	Note	%±
2010	2,429		—
2020	2,597		6.9%
U.S. Decennial Census; 1860–1870 1880-1890; 1900 1910 1920; 1930 1940 1950; 1960 1970 1980; 1990 2000 2010; 2020

Buckhorn first appeared as a census designated place in the 2010 U.S. census.

The 2020 United States census reported that Buckhorn had a population of 2,597. The population density was 526.7 inhabitants per square mile (203.4/km^{2}). The racial makeup of Buckhorn was 83.6% White, 0.6% African American, 1.7% Native American, 1.4% Asian, 0.0% Pacific Islander, 2.0% from other races, and 10.6% from two or more races. Hispanic or Latino of any race were 9.7% of the population.

There were 1,220 households, out of which 13.3% included children under the age of 18, 50.7% were married-couple households, 7.6% were cohabiting couple households, 20.4% had a female householder with no partner present, and 21.2% had a male householder with no partner present. 30.2% of households were one person, and 17.0% were one person aged 65 or older. The average household size was 2.13. There were 756 families (62.0% of all households).

The age distribution was 13.7% under the age of 18, 3.6% aged 18 to 24, 15.7% aged 25 to 44, 30.5% aged 45 to 64, and 36.5% who were 65 years of age or older. The median age was 59.5 years. For every 100 females, there were 115.9 males.

There were 1,692 housing units at an average density of 343.1 units per square mile (132.5 units/km^{2}), of which 1,220 (72.1%) were occupied. Of these, 86.6% were owner-occupied, and 13.4% were occupied by renters.

== Climate ==
Climate data for Buckhorn
Month	Jan	Feb	Mar	Apr	May	Jun	Jul	Aug	Sep	Oct	Nov	Dec	Year
Record high °F (°C)	77 (25)	85 (29)	94 (34)	90 (32)	100 (38)	108 (42)	110 (43)	110 (43)	108 (42)	98 (37)	86 (30)	78 (26)	108 (42)
Mean daily maximum °F (°C)	52.0 (11.1)	57.3 (14.1)	61.5 (16.4)	67.0 (19.4)	74.1 (23.4)	82.8 (28.2)	91.1 (32.8)	90.5 (32.5)	85.3 (29.6)	75.6 (24.2)	61.0 (16.1)	51.8 (11.0)	70.8 (21.6)
Mean daily minimum °F (°C)	32.0 (0.0)	33.8 (1.0)	35.5 (1.9)	39.0 (3.9)	45.1 (7.3)	51.2 (10.7)	57.0 (13.9)	56.5 (13.6)	52.3 (11.3)	44.4 (6.9)	37.5 (3.1)	32.7 (0.4)	43.1 (6.2)
Record low °F (°C)	5 (−15)	13 (−11)	16 (−9)	18 (−8)	27 (−3)	30 (−1)	39 (4)	39 (4)	30 (−1)	23 (−5)	19 (−7)	9 (−13)	5 (−15)
Average precipitation inches (mm)	8.80 (224)	7.51 (191)	7.01 (178)	3.72 (94)	1.83 (46)	0.67 (17)	0.10 (2.5)	0.12 (3.0)	0.69 (18)	2.40 (61)	5.28 (134)	7.28 (185)	45.41 (1,153.5)
Average snowfall inches (cm)	6.9 (18)	4.8 (12)	4.8 (12)	1.5 (3.8)	0.0 (0.0)	0.0 (0.0)	0.0 (0.0)	0.0 (0.0)	0.0 (0.0)	0.0 (0.0)	0.7 (1.8)	4.5 (11)	23.2 (58.6)
Source: NOAA

== Politics ==
In the state legislature, Buckhorn is in the 4th senatorial district, represented by Republican Marie Alvarado-Gil, and the 1st Assembly district, represented by Republican Heather Hadwick. Federally, Buckhorn is in California's 5th congressional district, represented by Republican Tom McClintock.
