= Jackson, California =

City in California, United States

Jackson
- City
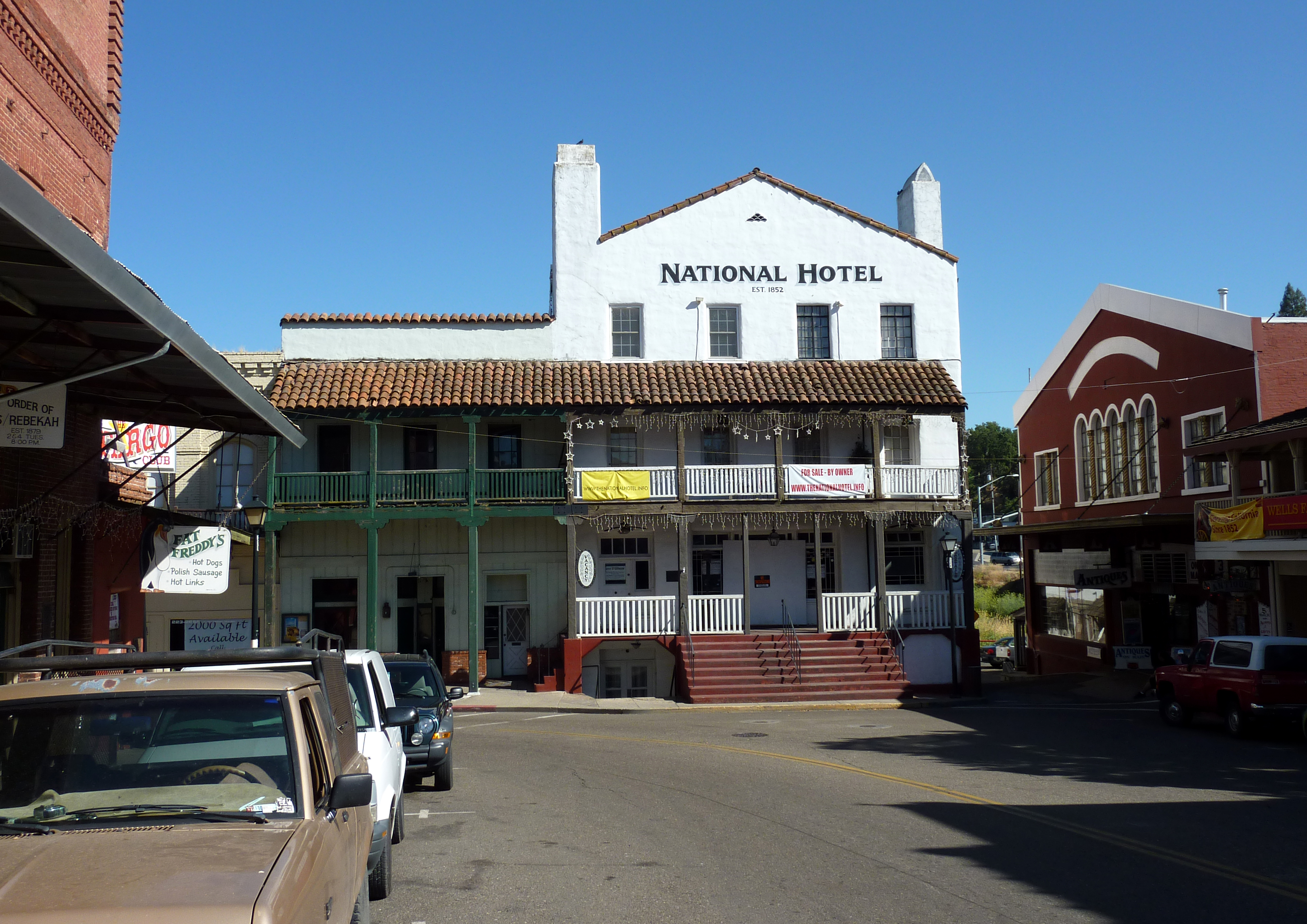
- Historic downtown Jackson

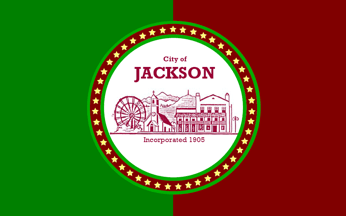
- Flag
- Motto(s): "Preserving our past, enriching our present, building our future"
- Interactive map of Jackson
- Location in California Jackson (the United States)
- Coordinates: 38°20′56″N 120°46′27″W
- Country: United States
- State: California
- County: Amador
- Settled: 1848
- County Seat, Amador County: 1854
- Incorporated: December 5, 1905

Government
  - Mayor: Steve McLean
  - Vice Mayor: Chad Simmons
  - State Senate: Marie Alvarado-Gil (R)
  - State Assembly: Heather Hadwick (R)
  - U. S. Congress: Tom McClintock (R)

Area
  - Total: 3.58 sq mi (9.28 km^{2})
  - Land: 3.58 sq mi (9.28 km^{2})
  - Water: 0 sq mi (0.00 km^{2}) 0%
- Elevation: 1,217 ft (371 m)

Population (2020)
  - Total: 5,019
  - Density: 1,400/sq mi (541/km^{2})
- Time zone: UTC-8 (PST)
  - Summer (DST): UTC-7 (PDT)
- ZIP code: 95642
- Area code: 209
- FIPS code: 06-36980
- GNIS feature IDs: 1658849, 2410128
- Website: ci.jackson.ca.us

California Historical Landmark
- Reference no.: 118

Jackson (formerly Botilleas, Botilleas Spring, Bottileas, Bottle Spring, and Botellas) is a city in and the county seat of Amador County, California, United States. Its population was 5,019 at the 2020 census, up from 4,651 at the 2010 census. The city is accessible by both State Route 49 and State Route 88.

== Geography and geology ==
According to the United States Census Bureau, the city has a total area of 3.6 square miles (9.3 km^{2}), all land. Jackson Creek traverses the city. Alluvial soils such as Pardee cobbly loam is found throughout the Jackson area.

=== Climate ===
According to the Köppen climate classification, Jackson has a hot-summer Mediterranean climate (abbreviated Csa).

Climate data for Jackson, 1991–2020 simulated normals (1243 ft elevation)
Month	Jan	Feb	Mar	Apr	May	Jun	Jul	Aug	Sep	Oct	Nov	Dec	Year
Mean daily maximum °F (°C)	55.4 (13.0)	58.6 (14.8)	62.6 (17.0)	67.1 (19.5)	76.3 (24.6)	86.4 (30.2)	93.4 (34.1)	91.9 (33.3)	86.7 (30.4)	76.6 (24.8)	63.9 (17.7)	55.2 (12.9)	72.8 (22.7)
Daily mean °F (°C)	46.4 (8.0)	48.7 (9.3)	52.0 (11.1)	55.2 (12.9)	62.6 (17.0)	70.3 (21.3)	76.6 (24.8)	75.9 (24.4)	71.6 (22.0)	63.1 (17.3)	52.9 (11.6)	46.2 (7.9)	60.1 (15.6)
Mean daily minimum °F (°C)	37.2 (2.9)	38.8 (3.8)	41.4 (5.2)	43.5 (6.4)	48.7 (9.3)	54.5 (12.5)	59.9 (15.5)	59.9 (15.5)	56.7 (13.7)	49.6 (9.8)	42.1 (5.6)	37.0 (2.8)	47.4 (8.6)
Average precipitation inches (mm)	5.54 (140.84)	5.34 (135.71)	4.86 (123.33)	2.94 (74.72)	1.60 (40.74)	0.40 (10.21)	0.02 (0.47)	0.04 (0.95)	0.22 (5.61)	1.61 (40.88)	3.00 (76.26)	5.40 (137.19)	30.97 (786.91)
Average dew point °F (°C)	38.1 (3.4)	39.0 (3.9)	41.7 (5.4)	43.0 (6.1)	45.9 (7.7)	47.8 (8.8)	49.8 (9.9)	48.2 (9.0)	45.5 (7.5)	41.9 (5.5)	40.5 (4.7)	37.4 (3.0)	43.2 (6.2)
Source: PRISM Climate Group

== History ==
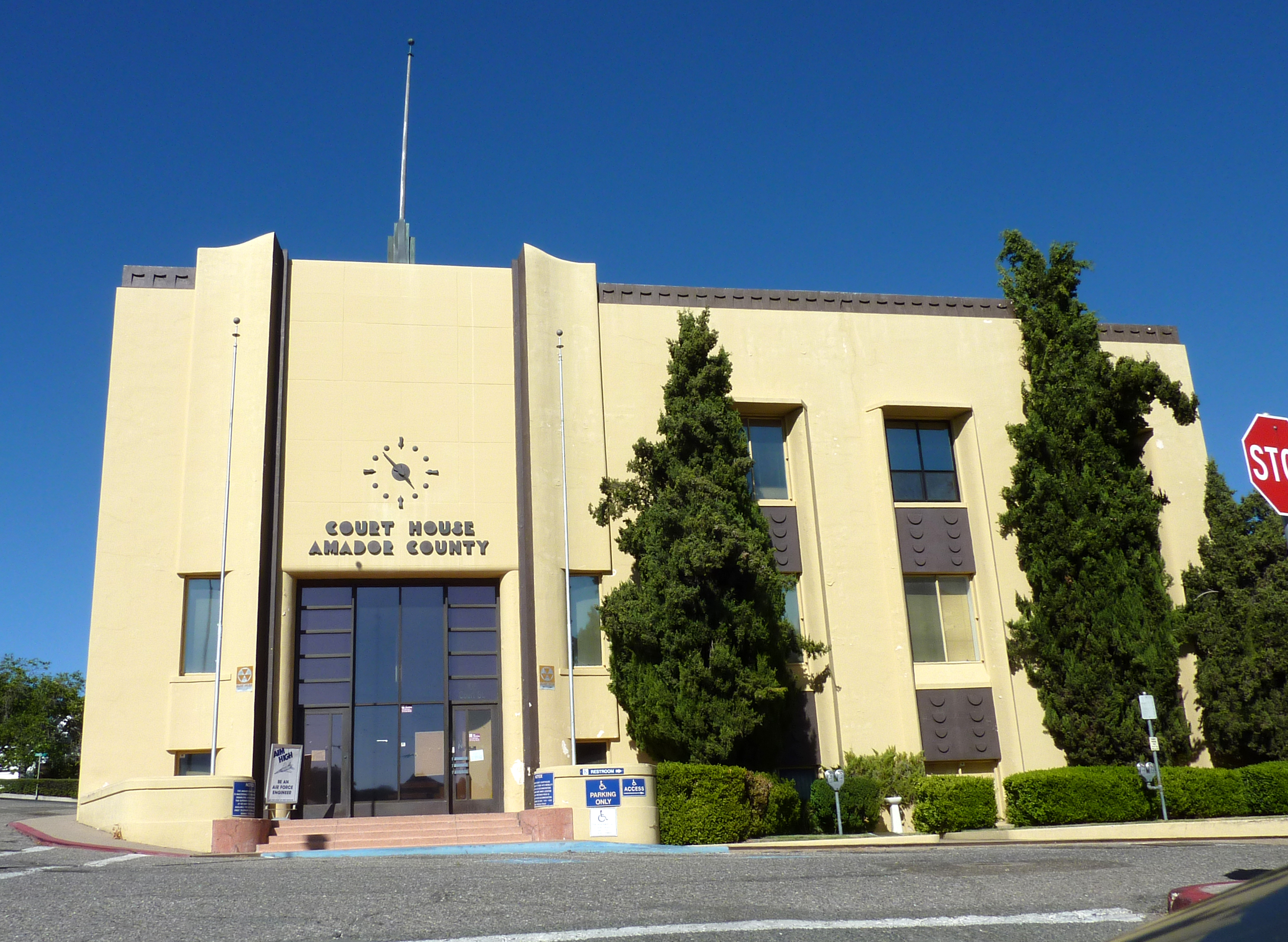
The Amador County Courthouse consists of two buildings, the second courthouse (built 1864) and the Hall of Records (1893), that were enclosed and combined in 1939 with an Art Deco exterior. It was recently closed and legal activities have resumed in another, newer facility.

=== Early history ===
The area was inhabited by the Northern Sierra Indians, who occupied areas along creeks, spring, and seep areas, including permanent and seasonal drainages, flat ridges, and terraces. Therefore, areas along watercourses are considered likely locations for prehistoric cultural resources. Permanent villages were usually placed on elevations above seasonal flood levels. Surrounding areas were used for hunting and seed, acorn, and grass gathering.

=== 19th century and later ===
Jackson, named after Colonel Alden Jackson, was founded in 1848 around a year-round spring. Settlement of the region by American pioneers was stimulated by the discovery of gold in the Sierra foothills around 1848. The settlement was named for a local lawyer who was liked by miners named Alden Appola Moore Jackson. Although Amador County was an important mining center, its county seat of Jackson was not typical of the early gold camps. The camp grew quickly, as besides being a popular mining spot, it was also a convenient stopping place on the road from Sacramento to the Southern Mines. The camp became an important supply and transportation center for the neighboring towns, and by 1850, its population had reached an estimated 1,500. Jackson grew first as a watering hole for cattle, then as one of the earliest and most durable of the mother lode's hard rock mining areas. In 1854, Jackson became the county seat of newly formed Amador County, California. Previously, from 1851 to 1852, it had been the county seat of Calaveras County.

Placer mining gave out by the 1860s, replaced by hard rock mining. One of the town's most prominent historical landmarks, the Kennedy Mine, began operation in 1860; at the time of its closure during World War II in 1942, it was the deepest gold mine in North America, at 1802 m (5912 ft). On August 27, 1922, 47 miners became trapped when a fire broke out in the Argonaut mine. All 47 men died in the fire, but the last body was not recovered until over a year later. The Argonaut mine incident was the worst gold mine disaster in US history.

In October 1942, the US government passed the War Production Board Limitation Order, which signaled the demise of gold mining in California. The government needed men for the war and gold was not considered a strategic war metal.

== Landmarks ==
- Argonaut and Kennedy Mines: California Historical Landmark No. 786.
- Jackson Gate: Jackson Gate, on the north fork of Jackson Creek, takes its name from a fissure in a reef of rock that crosses the creek. In 1850, about 500 miners worked here and the first mining ditch in the county was dug here; its water sold for $1 per inch, CHL No. 118.
- Site of Jackson's Pioneer Jewish Synagogue: On September 18, 1857, Congregation B'nai Israel of Jackson dedicated on this site the first synagogue in the Mother Lode. High holy day worship continued until 1869 when the larger Masonic Hall was used to accommodate the congregation. The wooden structure then served as a schoolhouse until 1888. Relocated onto a nearby lot, it became a private dwelling, and was razed in 1948, CHL No. 865. The Jackson Pioneer Jewish Cemetery (active from 1857 to 1921) was connected to the synagogue.
- Pioneer Hall: The Order of Native Daughters of the Golden West was organized on these premises, the site of the Pioneer Hall, on September 11, 1886, CHL No. 34.
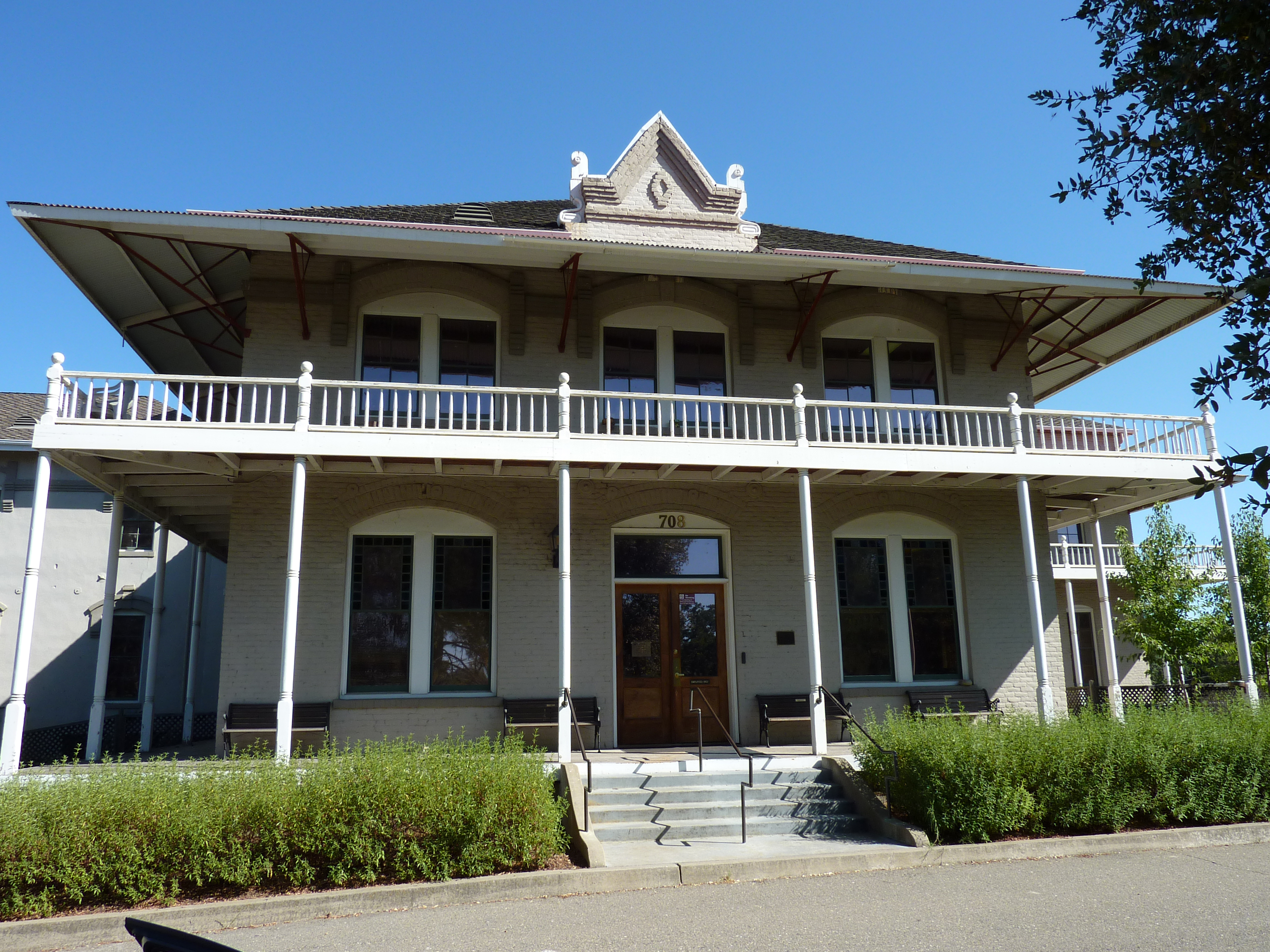
Amador County Hospital Building

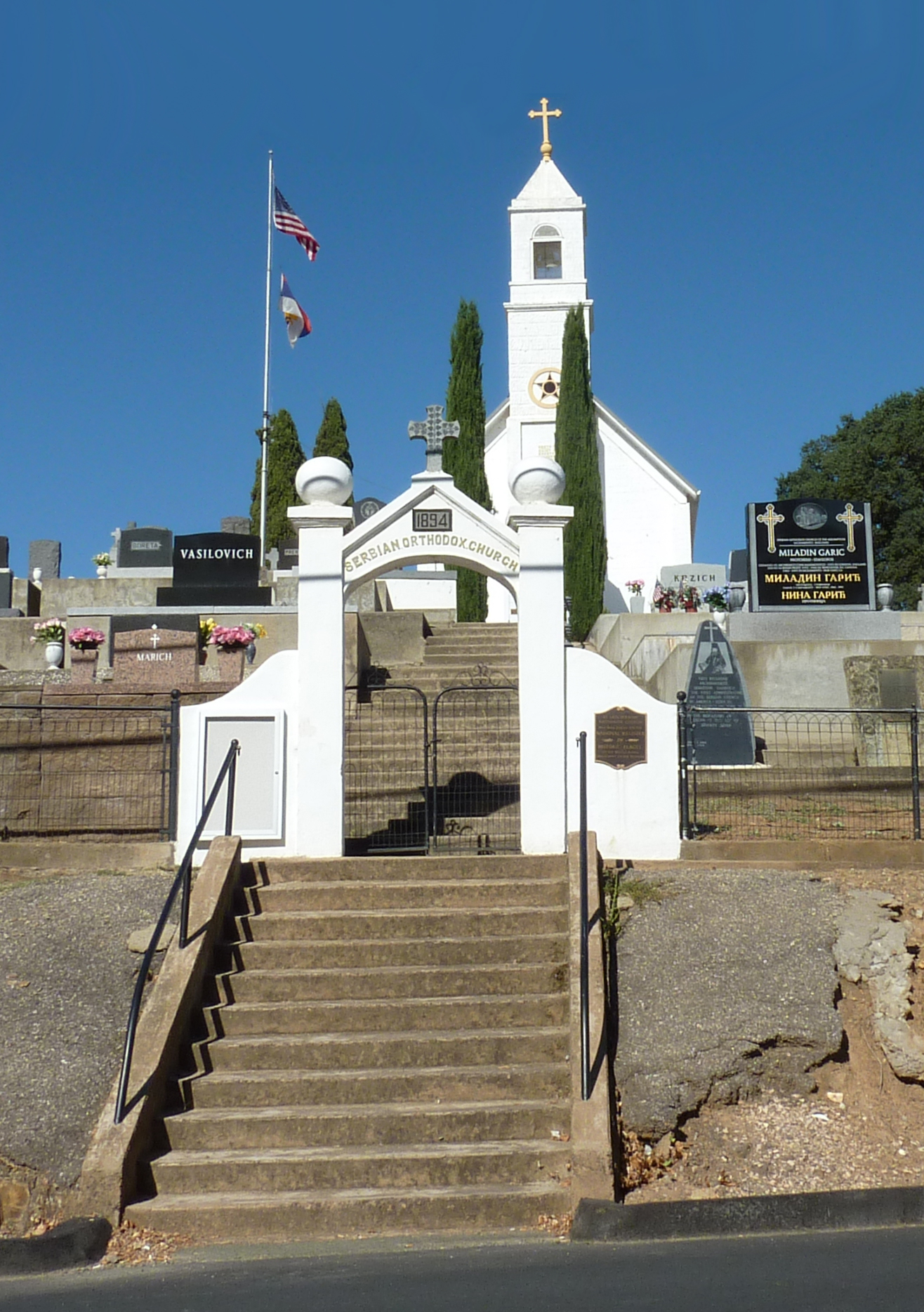
Saint Sava Serbian Orthodox Church

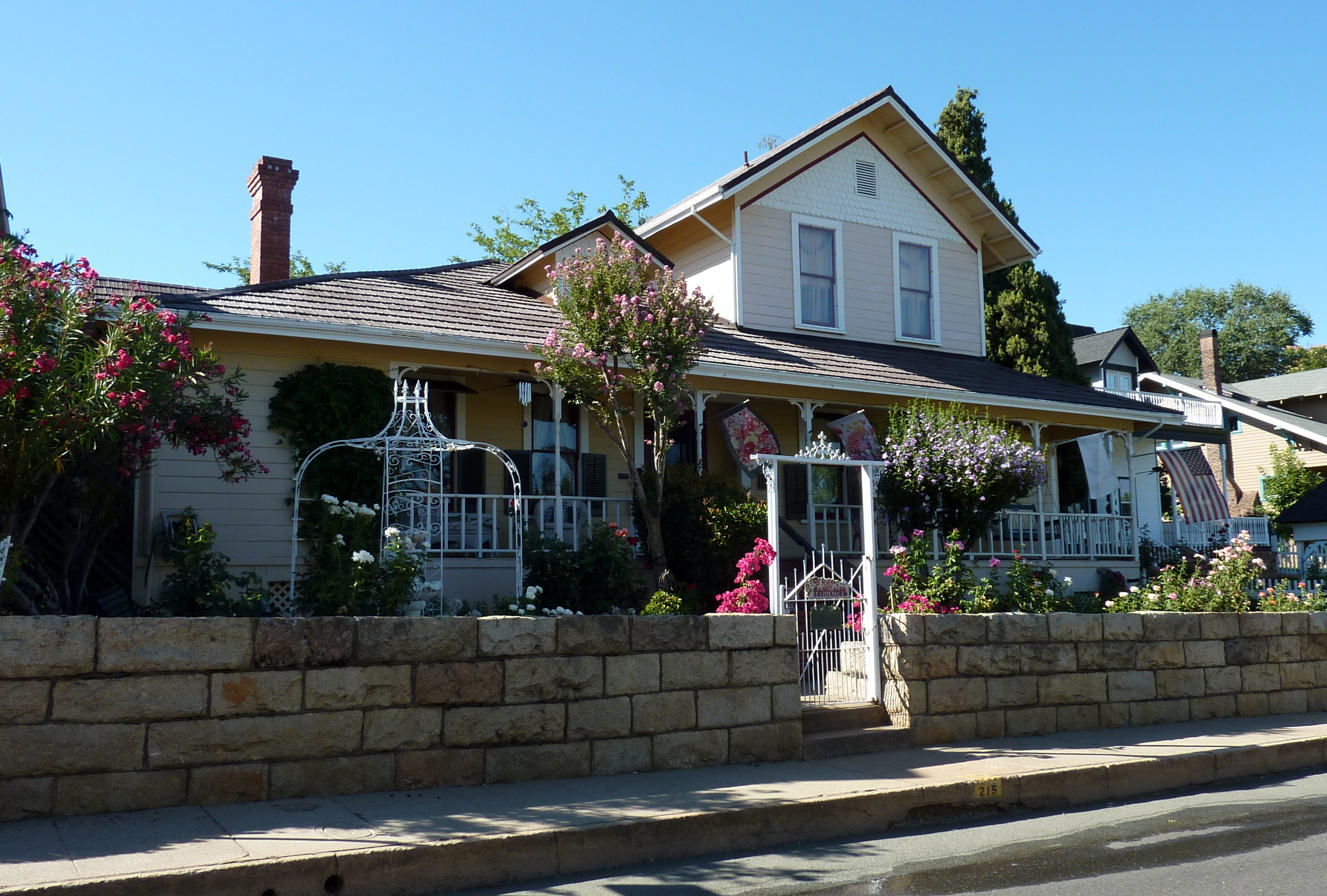
Grace Blair DePue House and Indian Museum

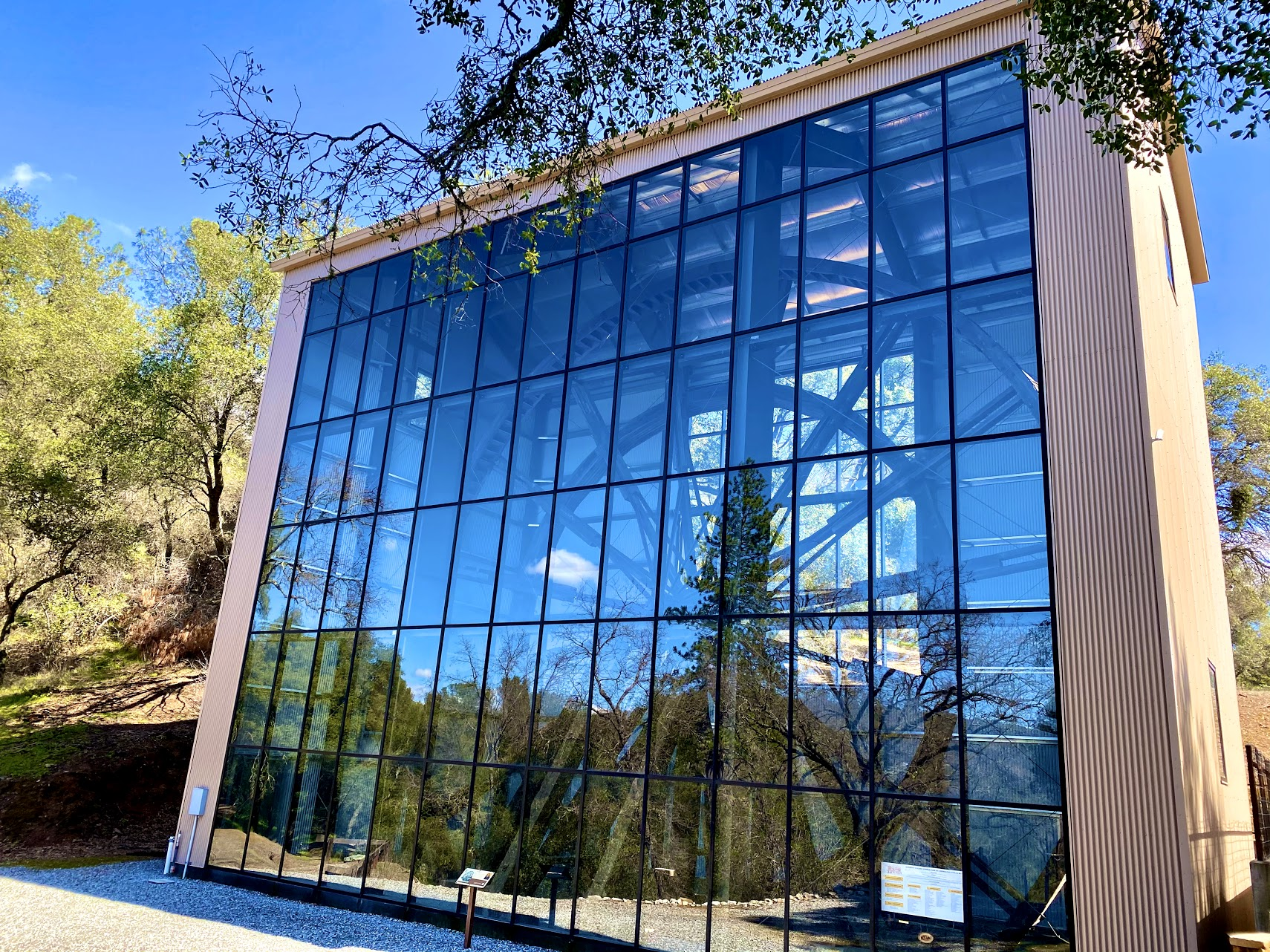
Kennedy Tailing Wheels Park

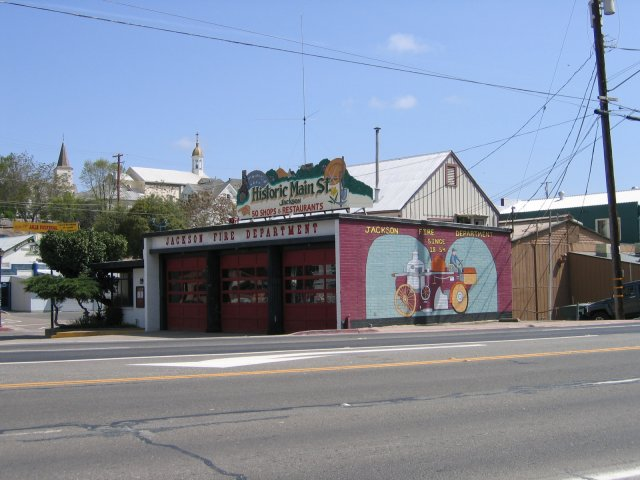
Historic Firehouse, Downtown

Memorial Clock

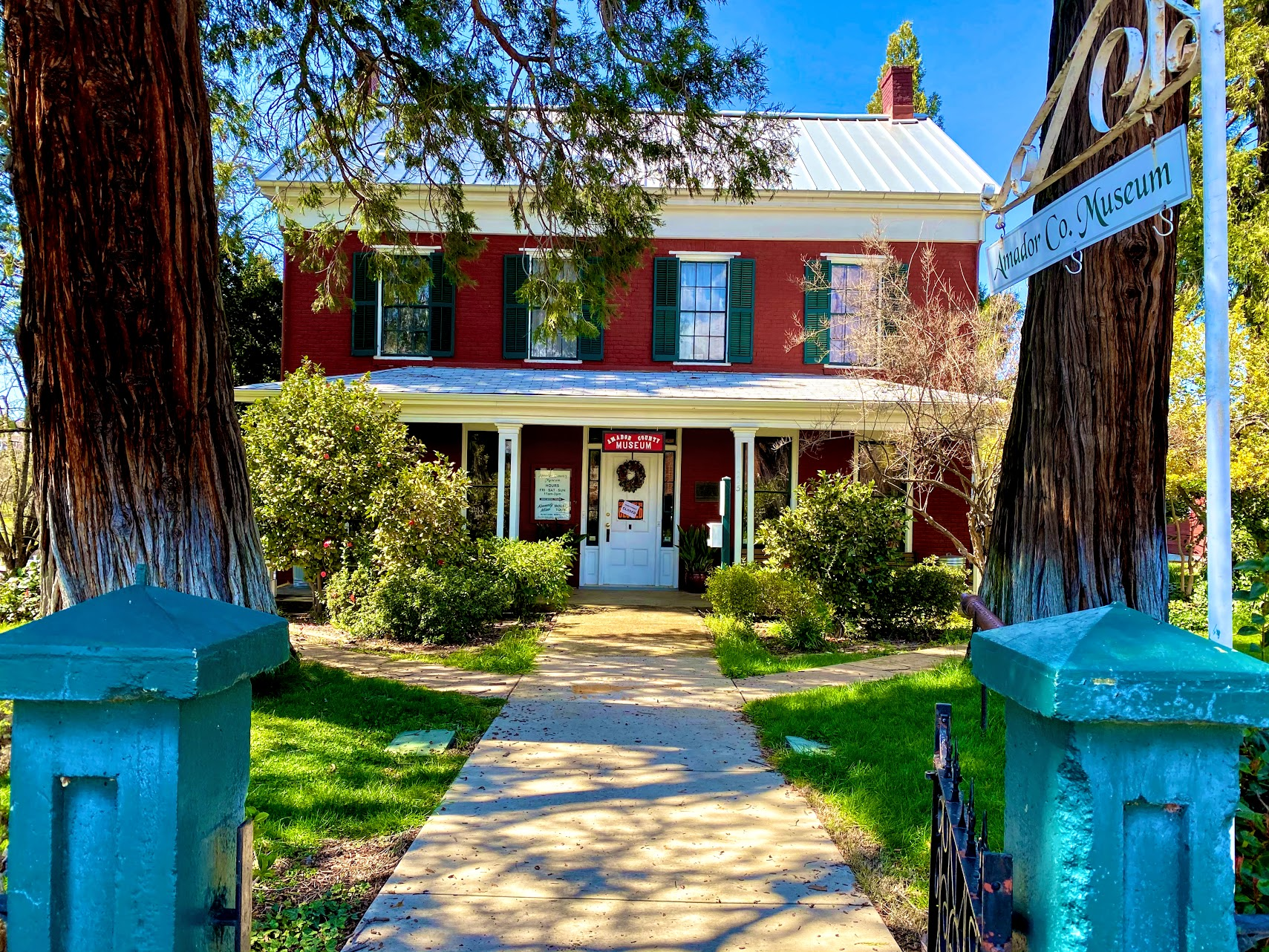
Amador County Museum

== Demographics ==
Historical population
Census	Pop.	Note	%±
1880	1,040		—
1910	2,035		—
1920	1,601		−21.3%
1930	2,005		25.2%
1940	2,024		0.9%
1950	1,879		−7.2%
1960	1,852		−1.4%
1970	1,924		3.9%
1980	2,331		21.2%
1990	3,545		52.1%
2000	3,989		12.5%
2010	4,651		16.6%
2020	5,019		7.9%
2024 (est.)	5,079	▲	1.2%
U.S. Decennial Census

Jackson has a large Serbian community and Serbian Orthodox church.

=== 2020 census ===
As of the 2020 census, Jackson had a population of 5,019. The population density was 1,401.2 inhabitants per square mile (541.0/km^{2}). The median age was 49.2 years. 19.4% of residents were under the age of 18 and 30.4% of residents were 65 years of age or older. For every 100 females, there were 85.4 males, and for every 100 females age 18 and over, there were 79.8 males age 18 and over.

The Census reported that 96.6% of the population lived in households, 1.0% lived in non-institutionalized group quarters, and 2.4% were institutionalized. Additionally, 96.5% of residents lived in urban areas, while 3.5% lived in rural areas.

There were 2,185 households in Jackson, of which 24.7% had children under the age of 18 living in them. Of all households, 39.5% were married-couple households, 6.9% were cohabiting-couple households, 16.8% were households with a male householder and no spouse or partner present, and 36.8% were households with a female householder and no spouse or partner present. About 35.7% of all households were made up of individuals and 22.0% had someone living alone who was 65 years of age or older. The average household size was 2.22. There were 1,250 families (57.2% of all households).

There were 2,406 housing units, of which 9.2% were vacant. Of occupied housing units (90.8%), 56.3% were owner-occupied and 43.7% were occupied by renters. The homeowner vacancy rate was 2.7% and the rental vacancy rate was 6.3%.

Racial composition as of the 2020 census
Race	Number	Percent
White	3,906	77.8%
Black or African American	44	0.9%
American Indian and Alaska Native	121	2.4%
Asian	106	2.1%
Native Hawaiian and Other Pacific Islander	8	0.2%
Some other race	258	5.1%
Two or more races	576	11.5%
Hispanic or Latino (of any race)	818	16.3%

=== Demographic estimates ===
In 2023, the US Census Bureau estimated that 9.8% of the population were foreign-born. Of all people aged 5 or older, 85.5% spoke only English at home, 8.0% spoke Spanish, 2.3% spoke other Indo-European languages, 4.2% spoke Asian or Pacific Islander languages, and 0.0% spoke other languages. Of those aged 25 or older, 88.5% were high school graduates and 20.0% had a bachelor's degree.

=== Income and poverty ===
The median household income was $75,051, and the per capita income was $40,299. About 3.7% of families and 10.1% of the population were below the poverty line.

== High school ==
Jackson has only one high school, Argonaut High School. The school's namesake is the Argonaut Mine, located in town.

== Notable people ==
- Robert Grant Aitken, astronomer
- John C. Begovich, politician
- Anthony Caminetti, politician
- Ernest Gallo, winemaker
- James T. Farley, politician
- Marie Suize, French woman who became a gold miner in early Jackson
