= Five Mile Drive-Sutter Creek Bridge =

- U.S. National Register of Historic Places
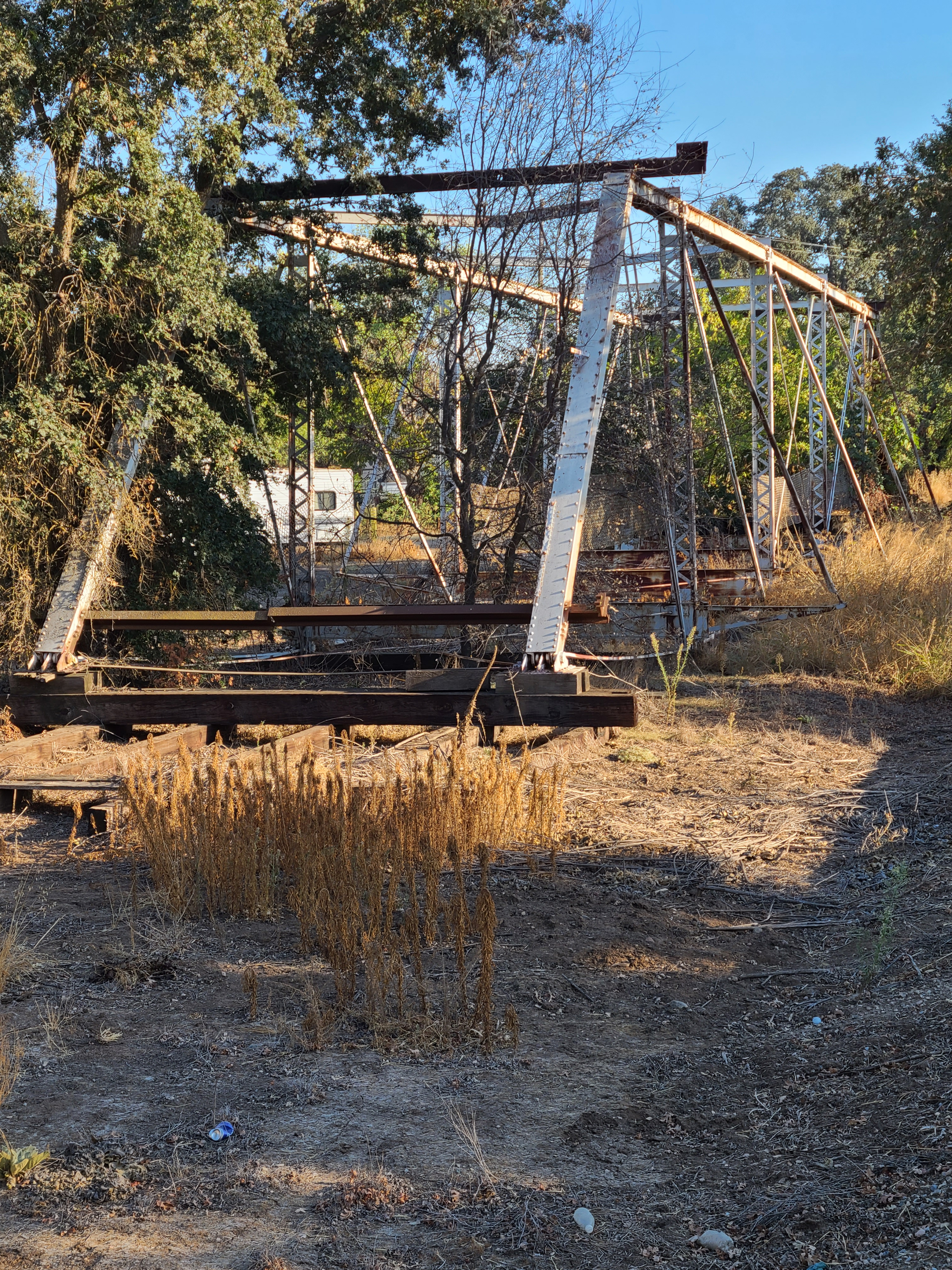

- Location within California
- Nearest city: Ione, California
- Coordinates: 38°21′14″N 120°57′27″W
- Area: less than one acre
- Built: 1910
- Built by: Berkeley Steel Co.
- Architect: V.F. Garbarini
- Architectural style: Pony Pratt half-truss
- NRHP reference No.: 86000734
- Added to NRHP: April 11, 1986

The Five Mile Drive-Sutter Creek Bridge, in Amador County, California near Ione, California, is a Pony Pratt half-truss bridge built in 1910. It was listed on the United States National Register of Historic Places in 1986.

The United States National Register nomination describes it as a:

steel, pin-connected, pony Pratt half-hip truss bridge on concrete wall abutments with flared wing walls. It crosses Sutter Creek in a wooded, rural setting. At a length of 115 feet (five panels at 23 feet each), it is very long for a pony truss, which is generally used for light vehicular traffic on short spans. In profile, the truss is a typical Pratt half-hip, but it is somewhat unusual in that the floor beams are extended five feet outside of the plane of the truss chords, and an additional vertical brace attaches to the end of the floor beams. This was probably done to provide extra support to compensate for the length of the truss. Another unusual feature is that the end posts terminate at a higher level than the interior verticals, giving the roadway a "sway-backed" configuration. The truss width (outside measurement) is 17 feet 4 inches and the roadway width is 12 feet 2 inches, with no wheel guards.

It is located at the intersection of Old Stockton Rd. and Five Mile Dr., over Sutter Creek, west of Ione, Amador County, California.
