= Lester Allan Pelton =

American mechanical engineer

Lester Allen Pelton
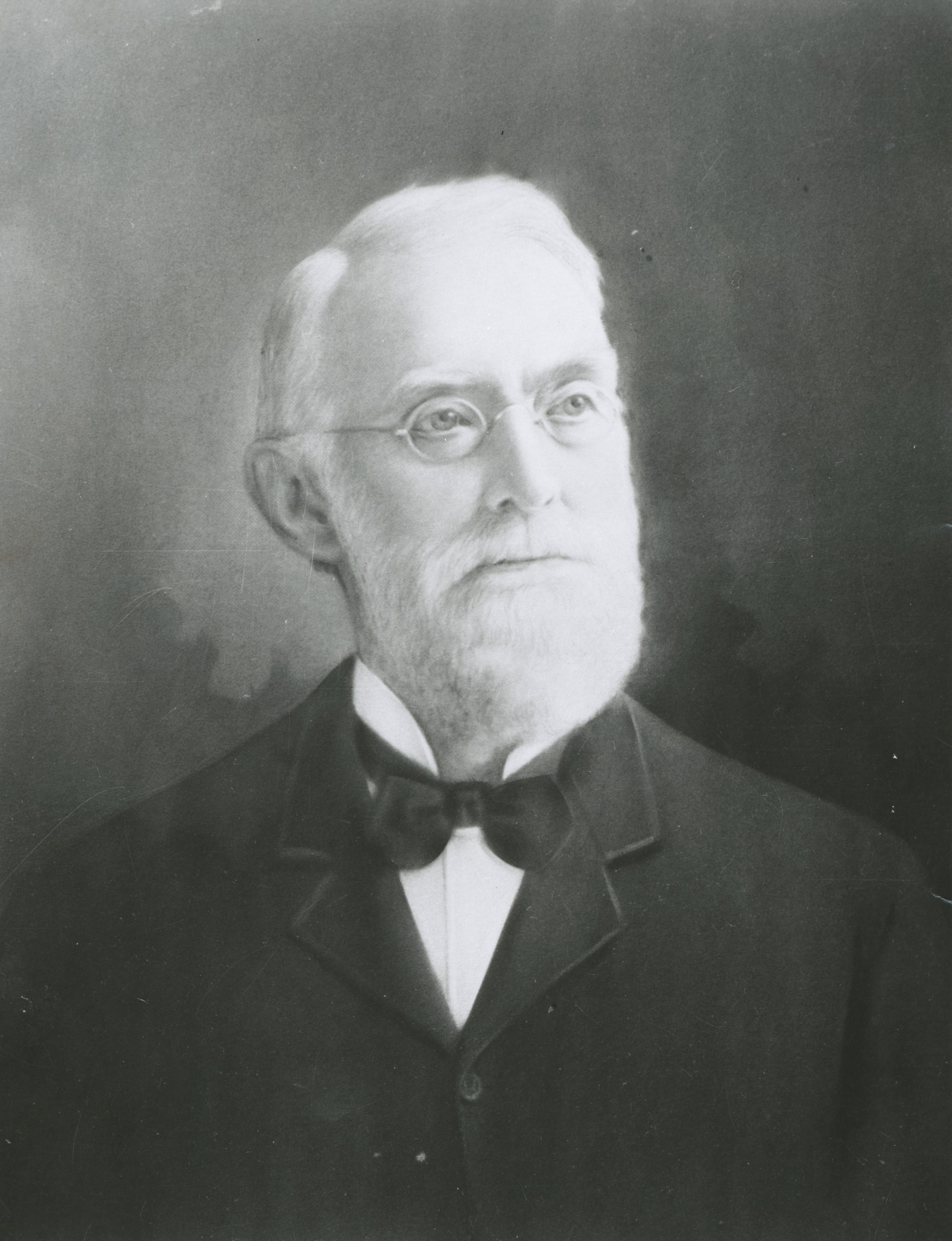
- Pelton, c. 1880
- Born: September 5, 1829; Vermillion, Ohio, U.S.
- Died: March 14, 1908 (aged 78); Oakland, California, U.S.
- Occupation: Inventor
- Awards: Elliott Cresson Medal (1895)

Lester Allan Pelton (September 5, 1829 – March 14, 1908) was an American inventor who contributed significantly to the development of hydroelectricity and hydropower in the American Old West as well as world-wide. In the late 1870s, he invented the Pelton water wheel, at that time the most efficient design of the impulse water turbine. Recognized as one of the fathers of hydroelectric power, he was awarded the Elliott Cresson Medal during his lifetime and is an inductee of the National Inventors Hall of Fame.

== Early life ==
Lester A. Pelton was born in a log-cabin in rural Vermilion Twp., Erie County, Ohio. His grandfather, Captain Josiah Pelton, who lost most of his assets as a sea-captain during the War-of-1812 era, shortly later brought his family to Ohio. Lester's father was Allen Pelton, and his mother was Fanny Cuddeback, from another local early pioneer family. As a youngster, Lester worked on his family's farm and probably attended the nearby "Cuddeback" grade-school.

In 1850, young Pelton, along with several other local males, emigrated from Ohio to participate in the California gold rush. He was not successful as a gold-miner, but he fished the Sacramento River and sold his catch locally; and he worked in wood-milling and carpentry. In 1860, after the gold strikes in the nearby Sierra Nevada he relocated to Camptonville—near the Yuba River and the California Mother Lode country—where he made his living as a millwright and carpenter. Pelton spent much of his time reading and observing mining activity; his work and studies gained him critical knowledge of mining equipment and processes and related engineering principles.

== Inventing the Pelton wheel ==
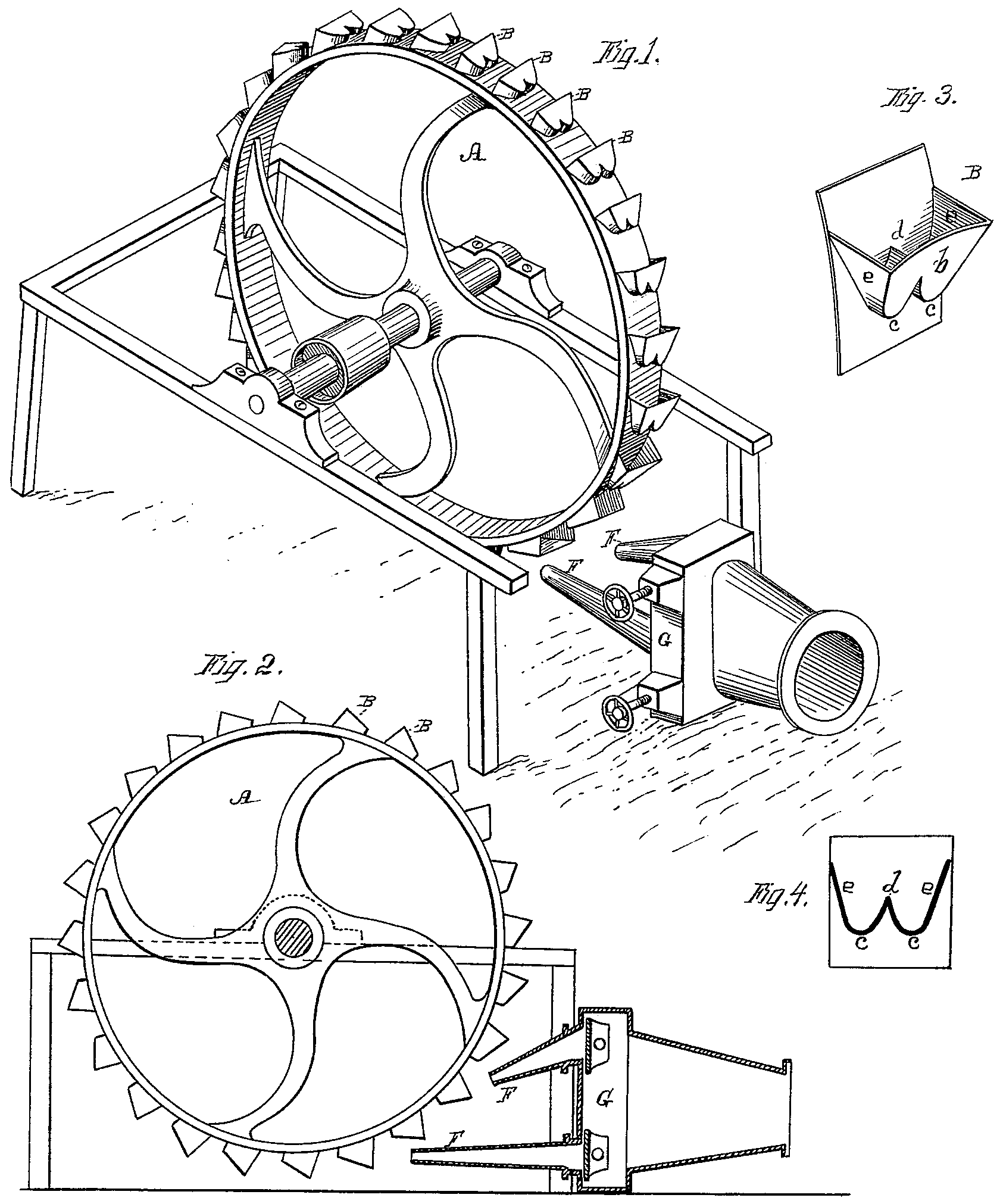
Figure from Pelton's original patent (October 1880)

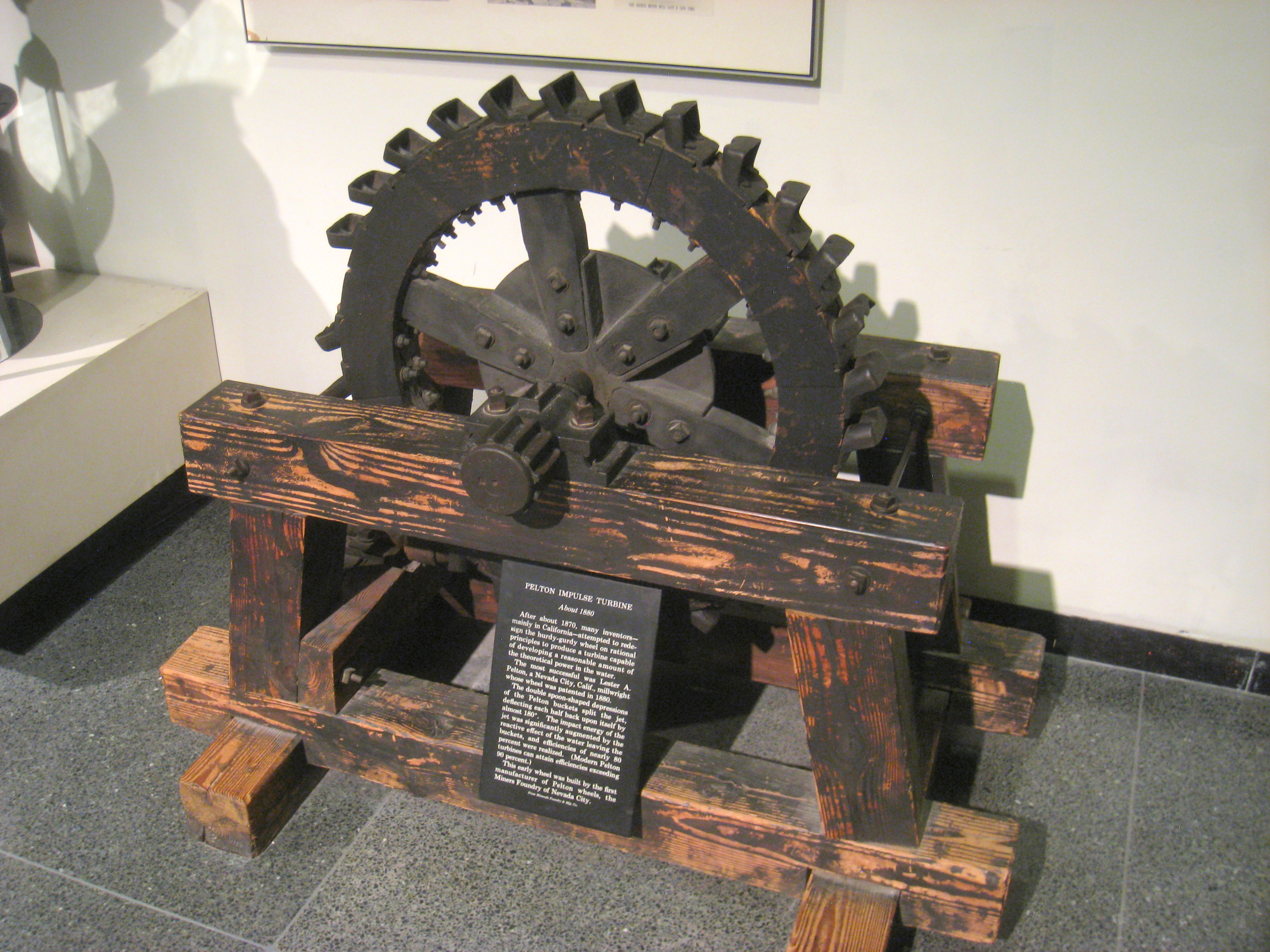
Pelton wheel, circa 1880, built by Miners Foundry, Nevada City

Pelton's ideas for improving the turbine water wheel came from his studies of mining equipment and operations in California's gold rush country. Summary descriptions of the local technology observed by Pelton, and of the science by which his turbine water wheel extracts kinetic energy from a coursing mountain stream follow...

Steam-heat powered much of local mining activities but required a lot of wood for fuel; nearby forests were routinely decimated. Turbine water wheels also were used to supply power, but these were inefficient in converting the kinetic energy of mountain streams to horsepower. D.P. Stern reports: "According to a 1939 article by W. F. Durand of Stanford University in Mechanical Engineering, Pelton's invention started from an accidental observation some time in the 1870s. Pelton was watching a spinning water turbine when the key holding its wheel onto its shaft slipped, causing it to become misaligned. Instead of the jet hitting the cups in their middle, the slippage made it hit near the edge; rather than the water flow being stopped, it was now deflected into a half-circle, coming out again with reversed direction. Surprisingly, the turbine now moved faster. That was Pelton's great discovery. In other turbines the jet hit the middle of the cup and the splash of the impacting water wasted energy."

Experimenting and modelling, Pelton improved upon the efficiency of the Knight wheel (developed earlier by the Knight Foundry at nearby Sutter Creek). The Knight wheel received the streamflow jet slightly off-center and at an angle into a single turbine cup. Alternatively, the Pelton wheel—by deploying a split double cup (in effect two cups side-by-side), then splitting the impinging water-jet directly onto the common vane of the double cup—captured a stream's kinetic energy more efficiently. There were two prime results of Pelton's design: it consolidated the introduction of a new physical science into the ancient human quest to develop hydropower, i.e., the science of the impulse turbine as opposed to the reaction turbine; and it revolutionized the use of turbines adapted for high head (i.e., elevation energy) sites. Before Pelton, almost all water turbines were reaction machines powered by water pressure, or head, while Pelton's wheel was powered by the kinetic energy of a high velocity water-jet which could be conveniently developed from a small mountain stream.

== Building the Pelton wheel ==
In the late 1870s Pelton modeled, tested and manufactured his first turbine wheel, dubbed the Pelton Runner—later referring to the impulse blades only—at the Miners Foundry in Nevada City, California. In 1878, at the Mayflower Mine in Nevada City, he installed the first operational Pelton wheel. At that time the Knight Foundry wheel was being sold as the industry standard, but in a head-to-head competition staged in 1883 at the Idaho Mine in nearby Grass Valley, Pelton's design proved much more efficient. The Pelton design provided 90 percent efficiency (of converting streamflow kinetic energy to horsepower) while the next best competitor achieved less than 77 percent—at a time when most extant water wheels typically rated less than 40 percent.

The Pelton wheel also provided sustained power during (typical) lowflow conditions in a mountain stream. In 1887 a miner attached Pelton's wheel to a dynamo and produced the first hydroelectric power in the Sierra Nevada.

In 1895, the largest installation of Pelton's wheel during his lifetime was accomplished at the North Star Mine Powerhouse, Grass Valley, California, by the engineer Arthur De Wint Foote, who designed and installed an over-sized wheel of 30 feet diameter; it performed successfully, greatly increasing the hydropower delivered by the Pelton runners to produce compressed air for mining operations.

Pelton patented his wheel as well as his novel design of the double cup runner, and in 1888 formed the Pelton Water Wheel Company in San Francisco to supply the growing demand for hydropower and hydroelectricity throughout the West and world-wide. 'Pelton' is a trademark name for the products of that company, but the term is widely used generically for similar impulse turbines.

== Death, legacy and awards ==
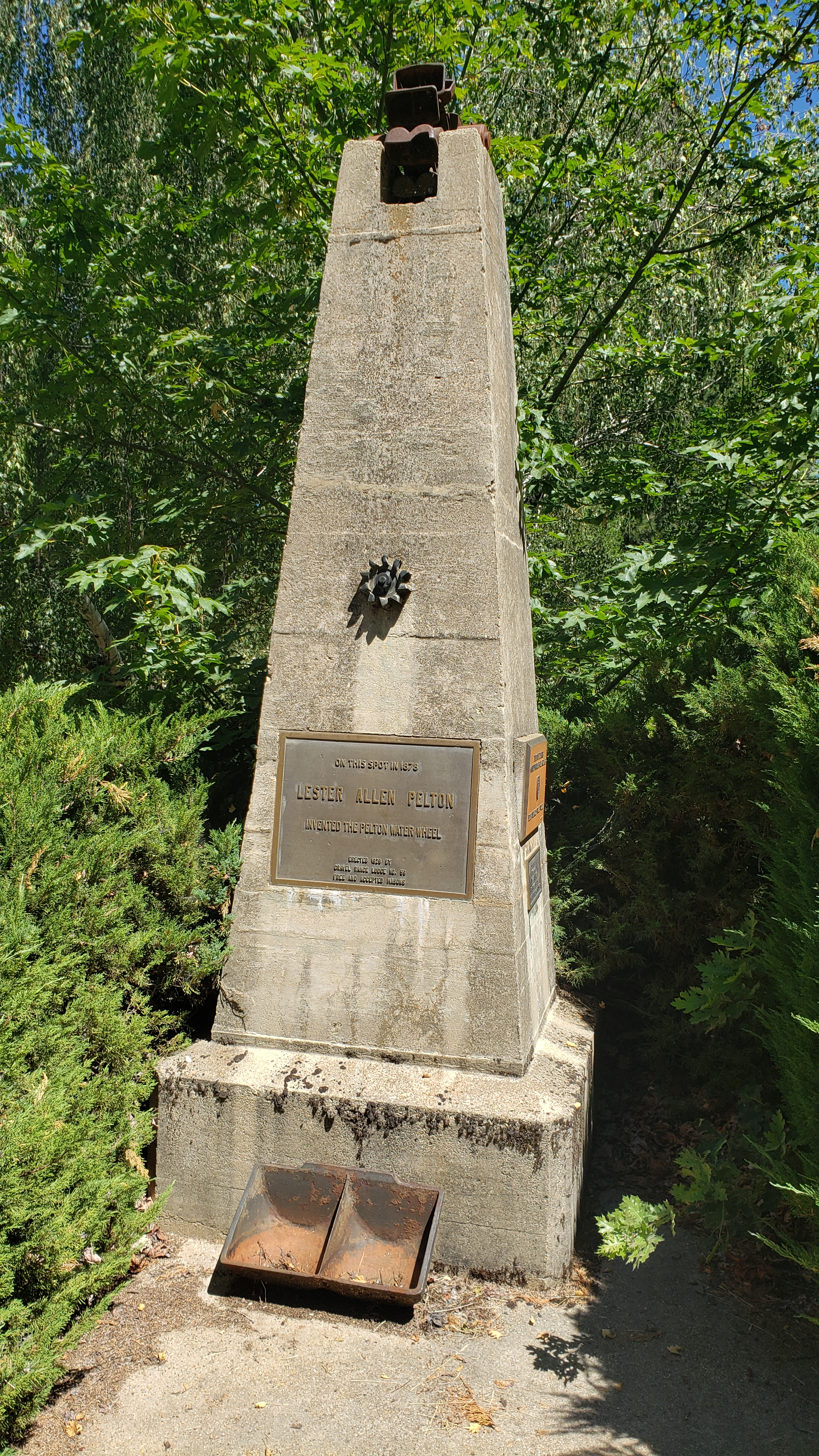
Monument to Pelton in Camptonville, California.

Pelton died in California at the age of 78 and is interred at his family cemetery site in Vermilion, Ohio. His Pelton Runner design is still used to produce hydroelectric power in the United States and around the world. Later designs such as the Turgo turbine, first patented in 1919, and the Banki turbine were inspired by the Pelton wheel.

In 1895, The Franklin Institute in Philadelphia, Pennsylvania, awarded Lester Pelton the Elliott Cresson Medal, since renamed the Benjamin Franklin Medal, for Pelton's accomplishments of invention in technology. In 2006, he was posthumously inducted into the National Inventors Hall of Fame in Alexandra, Virginia, formerly in Akron, Ohio. There are memorials and monuments celebrating Pelton and the Pelton Runner mounted in Camptonvlle, California, in the Miners Foundry in Nevada City, California, and at the Smithsonian Museum in Washington D.C., California Resort at Disneyland in Anaheim, among other sites.

In 1958, the actor William Hudson was cast as Pelton in the episode "Wheel of Fortune" on the syndicated television anthology series, Death Valley Days, hosted by Stanley Andrews. The episode focuses on Pelton's development of the principles of hydraulic mining.

== See also ==
- Hydropower
- Water turbine
- Hydraulic head
