= Tory Bruno =

American aerospace engineer and former ULA CEO

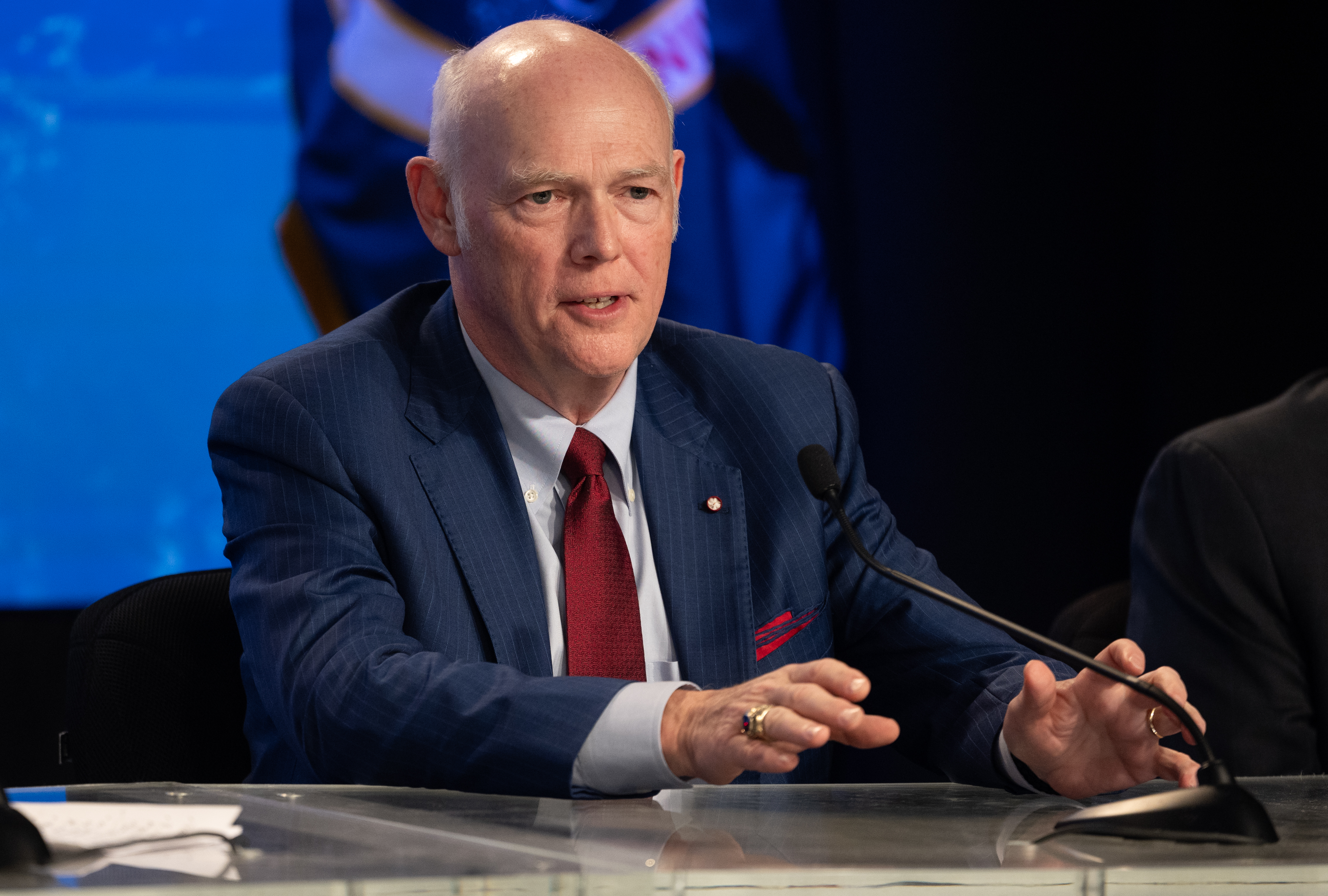
- Bruno in May 2024
- Born: Salvatore Thomas Bruno; November 3, 1961 (age 64); Monterey, California, U.S.
- Education: California Polytechnic State University (BS)
- Title: President, National Security at Blue Origin

Salvatore "Tory" Thomas Bruno (born November 3, 1961) is an American aerospace engineer and executive. He is currently president of the National Security Group of Blue Origin. Previously, Bruno was the President and Chief Executive Officer of United Launch Alliance (ULA) from August 2014 until December 2025. Before ULA, he worked at Lockheed Martin, where he advanced from engineer to executive.

== Early life ==
Salvatore "Tory" Thomas Bruno was born in Monterey, California, in 1961 to Martha Scott Bruno nee Martin and Thomas Salvatore Bruno, a commercial fisherman. Tory was raised by his maternal grandmother, Virginia Martin née Krause on her small ranch in California's Sierra Nevada Mountains in Amador County.

As early as nine, he was interested in rocketry. Inspired by watching the Moon landings, Bruno was determined to build his own model rockets. When he found a case of 80 year old dynamite in the back of the barn, he used a pen knife to cut open the sticks and extract the explosives which became propellant for his homemade solid rocket motors.

During his college career, Bruno was an astronomer’s assistant at the Lick Observatory where he focused on collecting spectra from distant galaxies using the Coude telescope in order to measure their rotation.

== Education ==
Bruno graduated from Amador County High School in Sutter Creek, California. He also briefly attended Queen Anne High School in Seattle.

He holds a bachelor's degree in mechanical engineering from the California Polytechnic State University, in San Luis Obispo, California, and has completed graduate courses and management programs at Harvard University, Santa Clara University, the Wye River Institute, San Jose State University and the Defense Acquisition University.

== Career ==
=== Lockheed Martin ===
Bruno started with Lockheed as a summer intern while still attending Cal Poly. He worked as a mechanical engineer in the quality assurance organization of the Missile Systems Division. He spent that summer working on various generations of the Fleet Ballistic Missile.

Upon graduation from Cal Poly, he returned to Lockheed as a structures designer working primarily on the Trident I and II missiles. After a few years, he transferred to the mechanical controls group. There, he developed experience in reaction and thrust vector control systems. These were applied to a wide variety of systems including the UGM-27 Polaris, UGM-73 Poseidon, Trident, LGM-30 Minuteman, and LGM-118 Peacekeeper as well as the Lockheed Launch Vehicle. Bruno also briefly supported the Space Shuttle.

Eventually, Bruno joined the advanced programs team where he worked on new rocket technologies, filing patents, trade secrets, and invention disclosures. After several years as a control systems designer and analyst, he transferred to the propulsion department where he became a ballistician and ordnance engineer.

Bruno served as program manager for Fleet Ballistic Missile (FBM) Rocket Propulsion, and was vice president and general manager of the FBM and intercontinental ballistic missile (ICBM) programs. During his tenure at Lockheed, Bruno held roles as the vice president of engineering for Lockheed Martin Space and as vice president and program manager of the Terminal High Area Altitude Defense System (THAAD) missile defense interceptor. Bruno’s last position at Lockheed before joining ULA was as vice president and general manager of Strategic and Missile Defense Systems.

=== United Launch Alliance ===
In August 2014, Bruno left Lockheed Martin to become the president and chief executive officer of United Launch Alliance (ULA), a joint venture owned by Boeing and Lockheed Martin. Bruno's appointment came as ULA was facing increased competition from newer entrants into the space launch industry, especially from SpaceX with their Falcon 9 rocket, in addition to political pressure from the United States Congress to stop purchasing the Russian-made RD-180 rocket engines for use on the Atlas V. Under Bruno's leadership, ULA responded to these issues by announcing Vulcan, a new rocket building on the technology of Atlas V and Delta IV, using the BE-4 engine developed by Blue Origin. On December 22, 2025, Tory Bruno resigned as president and CEO of United Launch Alliance in an unexpected departure. The ULA board did not specify a reason for Bruno’s resignation at the time.

=== Blue Origin ===
On December 26, 2025, Blue Origin announced that Bruno had been hired as the president of the company's National Security Group.

== Books ==
- Templar Organization, The Management of Warrior Monasticism, by S. T. Bruno (2000) ISBN 978-1587216213
- Templar Incorporated, by Tory Bruno (2006) ISBN 978-1419632402

== Honors and recognitions ==
- American Institute of Aeronautics and Astronautics (AIAA) Honorary Fellow
- Companion of the Naval Order of the United States
- Von Karman Lecture in Astronautics, AIAA
- Wernher von Braun Memorial Award, National Space Society
- Alan Smith Distinguished Lectureship, Florida Institute of Technology
- Cal Poly University Distinguished Alumni
- Commander of the Order of Merit, SMOTJ
- The American Astronautical Society (AAS) Space Flight Award
- Election to the National Academy of Engineering
