= Amador County Unified School District =

School district in California, United States

Address
- 217 Rex Avenue Jackson, California, 95642; United States

District information
- Type: Public
- Grades: K–12
- NCES District ID: 0602450

Students and staff
- Students: 3,889 (2020–2021)
- Teachers: 193.39 (FTE)
- Staff: 181.36 (FTE)
- Student–teacher ratio: 20.11:1

Other information
- Website: www.amadorcoe.org

Amador County Unified School District is a public school district based in Amador County, California, United States. It is the only school district in that county.

It includes Ione Elementary, Jackson Elementary, Pine Grove Elementary, Pioneer Elementary, Sutter Creek Elementary, Sutter Creek Primary, Plymouth Elementary, Ione Elementary, Jackson Junior High, Ione Junior High, Amador High School, Argonaut High School, Shenandoah Valley Charter School, and North Star Independence Community School.
