= Amador High School =

Public high school in California, United States

Location
- 330 Spanish Street; Sutter Creek, California 95685; United States; 38.39813°N 120.81094°W

Information
- Type: Public high school
- Established: 1911
- Status: Open
- School district: Amador County Unified School District
- NCES School ID
- Principal: Butch Wagner
- Faculty: 33.52 FTEs
- Grades: 9-12
- Age range: 13-18
- Enrollment: 702 (as of 2022–2023)
- Average class size: 27
- Student to teacher ratio: 20.94
- Language: English
- Hours in school day: 7 hours, 45 minutes
- Colors: Dark Blue, White, and Gray
- Fight song: "On to Victory"
- Athletics conference: Mother Lode League
- Mascot: Buffalo
- Nickname: Amador
- Team name: The Thundering Herd
- Rival: Argonaut High School
- National ranking: 1747 (2016-17)
- Newspaper: "Herd This"
- Yearbook: "The Skip"
- Feeder schools: Ione Junior High School, Jackson Junior High School
- Mascot Name: Buckingham "Bucky" Amador Buffalo
- Band: Amador High School Marching and Concert Band
- Website: amadorhs.amadorcoe.org

Amador High School, located in Sutter Creek, California, United States is one of two public high schools in Amador County. Originally known as "Amador County High School" at its inception in 1911, the school's name changed to "Sutter Creek Union High School" in 1916, reverting to "Amador County High School" in 1949, at the request of that year's graduating class. In 1984, upon completion of the merger of three school districts in the county, the name was changed to "Amador High School".

As of the 2020–21 school year, the school had an enrollment of 638 students and 31.6 classroom teachers (on an FTE basis), for a student–teacher ratio of 20.2:1. There were 177 students (27.7% of enrollment) eligible for free lunch and 14 (2.2% of students) eligible for reduced-cost lunch.

== Academics ==
California uses the Academic Performance Index (API) to measure annual school performance and year-to-year improvement. Amador High School had an API growth score of 791 in 2009. Amador High School's 2009 base score was 788, however the school did not meet its 2009 school-wide growth target.

Under No Child Left Behind Act, a school makes Adequate Yearly Progress (AYP) if it achieves the minimum levels of improvement determined by the state of California in terms of student performance and other accountability measures. Amador High School made AYP in 2009.

== School statistics ==
Scores on the California Standards Test follow:

Subject	Amador HS	Other CA Schools
English/Language Arts	58%	41%
Geometry	42%	24%
US History	38%	38%
Biology	51%	36%
Science	32%	35%

== Athletics ==
Amador High School is home of the Buffaloes (Thundering Herd). They are part of the Mother Lode League and a member of the California Interscholastic Federation (Sac-Joaquin Section).

In September 2022, shortly after the beginning of a game, the Amador County Unified School District cancelled all of the school's scheduled varsity football games, including the one then in progress, due to the discovery of a group chat with "racial overtones" involving a majority of the team, ending the team's entire 2022–2023 season with the cancelled games scored as forfeit. The matter was turned over to an independent investigator, with some allegations referred to law enforcement.

== Rivalry with Argonaut ==
Known as the "Cross-County Clash", the towns of Sutter Creek and Jackson have watched Argonaut High School & Amador High School face off in athletics for more than 100 years. In football, both teams play for the "Rotary Bell", which remains in the possession of the winning team for a full year. The town of Sutter Creek supports Amador during sports seasons by displaying the school's colors along Main Street.

== Theater ==
Amador High School Drama, Performing Arts and Publications is headed by theater teacher Giles Turner (who has held the position since 1967).

In 2013, the school's theater was renamed The Giles Turner Performing Arts Center, in honor of Turner's 50th year in the teaching profession. Later in 2018, Turner was again commemorated with a celebration held by former students/ In order to continue his legacy, a theater scholarship, the Giles Turner Alumni fund, was set up to provide financial aid to those who wish to study theater.

== Notable alumni ==
- Tory Bruno Class of 1979 - Aerospace Executive and Rocket Scientist. CEO of United Launch Alliance
- Rich Cellini Class of 1988 - Play-by-Play Announcer and Professor at University of San Francisco's Sports Management Program
- Enver Gjokaj: Actor
- John Vukovich: Major League Baseball player, manager, coach
