= Vance Mueller =

American football player (born 1964)

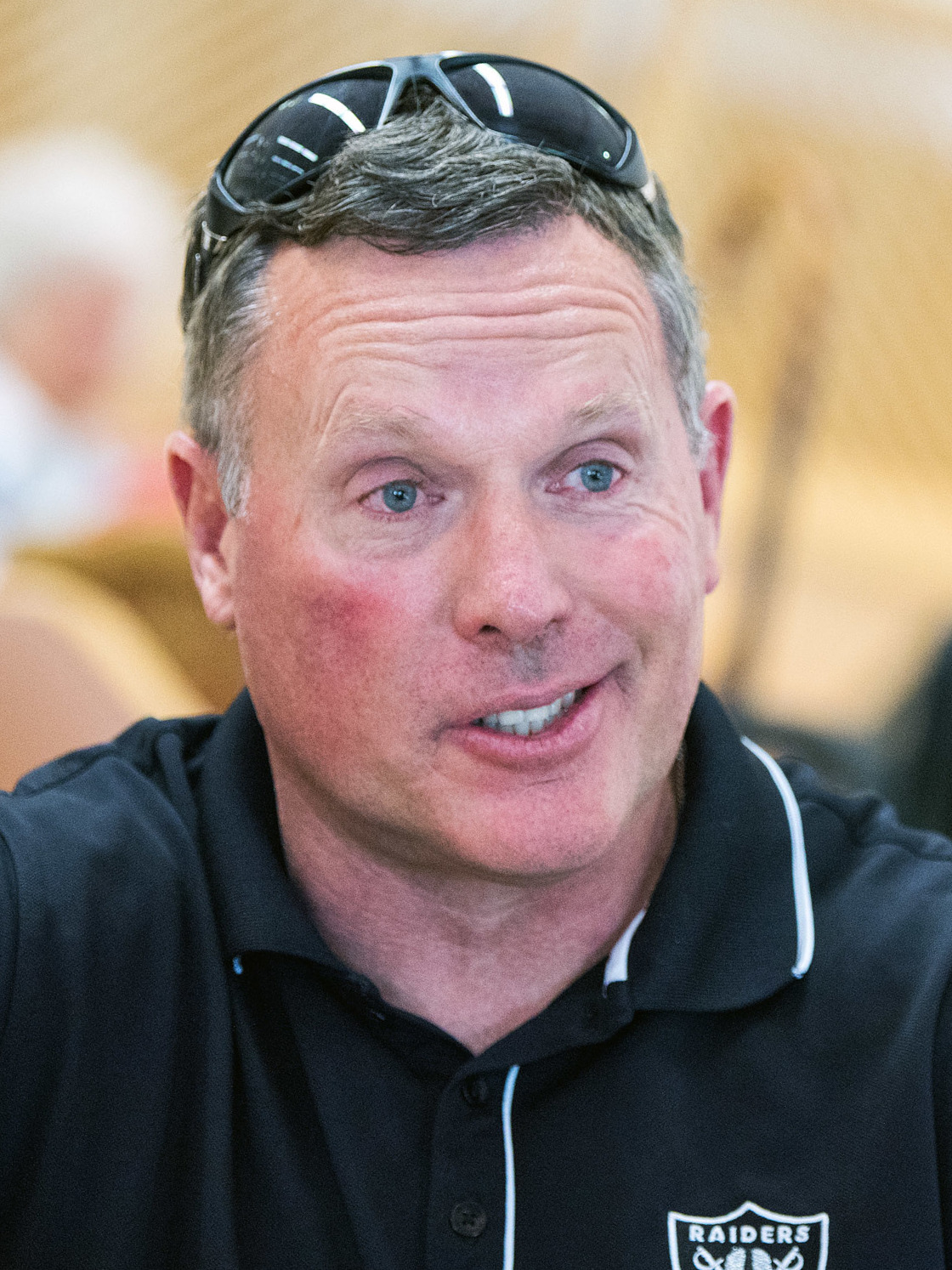
- Mueller in 2018

No. 42
- Position: Running back

Personal information
- Born: May 5, 1964 (age 62); Tucson, Arizona, U.S.
- Listed height: 6 ft 0 in (1.83 m)
- Listed weight: 210 lb (95 kg)

Career information
- High school: Jackson (CA)
- College: Occidental
- NFL draft: 1986: 4th round, 103rd overall pick

Career history
- Los Angeles Raiders (1986–1991)

Career NFL statistics
- Rushing yards: 469
- Rushing average: 3.7
- Rushing touchdowns: 3
- Stats at Pro Football Reference

Vance Mueller (born May 5, 1964) is an American former professional football player who was a running back with the Los Angeles Raiders of the National Football League (NFL). He played college football for the Occidental Tigers.

== Professional career ==
Mueller played for the National Football League's Los Angeles Raiders. Vance Mueller was drafted by the Los Angeles Raiders in the fourth round of the NFL Draft in 1986, he was the 103rd overall pick. He played from 1986 to 1990.

== College career ==
Mueller played college football at Occidental College.

== Early life ==
Mueller prepped at Jackson, CA High School.
