= Argonaut High School =

High school in Jackson, California, United States

Location
- 501 Argonaut Lane; Jackson, Amador County, California 95642; United States; 38°21′23″N 120°47′32″W

Information
- School type: Public high school
- Founded: 1912 Jackson High School / 1983 Argonaut High School
- School district: Amador County Unified School District
- Principal: Russell DeWalt
- Teaching staff: 30.57 (FTE)
- Grades: 9–12
- Gender: 52% male, 48% Female
- Student to teacher ratio: 19.43
- Colour
- Fight song: Zacatecas
- Athletics conference: Sierra Valley Conference
- Mascot: Mustangs
- Rivals: Amador High School; Calaveras High School; Bret Harte High School
- Website: Argonaut High School

Argonaut High School is located in Jackson, California in Amador County. It has about 580 students in grades 9–12. Previously known as Jackson High School, the school merged with Ione High School in 1983 to become Argonaut High School, named after the Argonaut Mine just a 1/2 mile off campus.

== Academics ==
Argonaut High received the coveted California Distinguished School award. While participation in AP programs runs about 40%, it is estimated that college readiness of students runs around 26.9%.

== Staff ==
As of June 25, 2015, Kelly Hunkins, the former principal of Pine Grove Elementary, replaced Dave Vicari as principal of Argonaut High School. Vicari now serves as Personnel Director for the Amador County Unified School District.

== Athletics ==
Argonaut High School is home of the Mustangs, and they participate in the Sierra Valley Conference. Argonaut/Jackson began its football program in 1922 and has won fourteen Mother Lode League Championships (41, 45, 52, 53, 57, 65, 66, 70, 84, 03, 08, 10, 11, 12). In its 105 seasons of football, Argonaut/Jackson has an overall record of 442 wins to 453 losses and 35 ties. In 61 seasons the Jackson Tigers had a record of 218–239–32. In 44 seasons, Argonaut has compiled a record of 229–222–3. Argonaut shares a heated rivalry with the Amador High School Buffaloes. Argonaut and Amador play in a football game for the "Rotary Bell" called the "Big Game," an event that the county continues to come watch since its inception in 1923. Sutter/Amador High holds the overall series edge with 58 wins to Jackson/Argonaut's 40 with nine ties. Since the inception of Argonaut High in 1983, the Big Game between Argonaut and Amador is tied with Argonaut at 21 wins and Amador at 21. Argonaut won 10 straight games in the series from 2003 to 2012. Argonaut currently plays its home games at Dan Barnett Field on the western edge of campus. The first game played at Dan Barnett Field was on Sep 16, 1989, vs Upper Lake High School. Argonaut is the only Amador County team to have won two Sac-Joaquin Section football championships as well as a California state title. Argonaut won the Div IV Section Championship in 2004 beating Linden 17-0 and the Div VI Section Championship in 2021 beating Rosemont 31–20. Argonaut football won the Division 6AA Northern California Title on December 3, 2021, by beating St. Vincent de Paul (Petaluma) 42–12 in Jackson. This was only the 2nd ever NorCal football title won by an MLL school. Argonaut defeated Quartz Hill 47–14 on December 11, 2021, for the California 6AA State Title. Coach Rick Davis retired at the end of the 2021 season. Argonaut's current coach is former MLL Football MVP and Argonaut alumni John Hickman. In 2024 Argonaut left the Mother Lode League for the Sierra Valley Conference. Argonaut had competed in the MLL since its inception in 1929.

Jackson High won the MLL Boys Basketball title in 48, 50, 53, 54, 61, 65, 66, and 74. Ione won the MLL title in 1960. Argonaut won MLL titles in 90, 96, 98, 99, and 06. Argonaut reached the Sac-Joaquin Section Finals in 1998 and 2006 in Division IV as well as in Division V in 2017 and 2019. The 2018 Argonaut Boys won the Sac-Joaquin Section Division V championship, the Nor-Cal Championship and lost in the state championship game.

The Argonaut Girls Basketball team has done very well since 2009 winning six MLL titles (09, 10, 13, 15, 18, 20). The team has also done very well at the sectional level. They were section runners-up in 2010 (Div IV), 2016 (Div V), and 2018 (Div V). They won the Sac-Joaquin Section title in 2017 (Div V), 2019 (Div V), and 2020 (Div IV). The 2020 team became the first team in Argonaut history to repeat as section title champions. The Argonaut Girls have reached the section finals five straight years (2016–2020) and a total of six times. The 2022 team made it to the Nor-Cal championship game falling the Brandon.

The Argonaut Girls Softball team has won the MLL title four times (94, 98, 11, 12). They have also captured three Sac-Joaquin Section titles. In 1998 they were the Div III champs and in 2017 and 2025 they were the Div VI champs.

The Jackson High Baseball team captured seven MLL titles coming in 45, 51, 54, 56, 59, 60, and 67. Ione won titles in 36 and 41. Argonaut has won six MLL titles in 85, 90, 92, 99, 2016 and 2019. Argonaut won the Division III Sac-Joaquin Section Title in 1990 and 1992 and were Section Runners Up in 2019 and 2023.

Jackson Wrestling won the MLL title in 1970 and won the MLL tournament in 1970, 1971, and 1972.

The Jackson/Argonaut Tennis team has done exceptionally well over the years winning 45 league titles, by far the most titles by any Jackson/Argonaut team. Jackson won tennis titles in 46, 48, 49, 50, 51, 52, 53, 54, 55, 56, 57, 58, 59, 60, 61, 62, 63, 66, 67, 69, 70, 72, 73, 74, 75, 78, 79, 80, 81, 82, 83. Argonaut won titles in 84, 88, 01, 02, 03, 04, 05, 10, 11, 12, 13, 16, 22, and 26. The 2022 Argonaut tennis team won the Sac—Joaquin Section D2 Co-Ed team title to become the first MLL team to win a section title in tennis.

The Jackson Boys Track and Field team won MLL titles in 1942, 1954, 1955, and 1965. The Ione boys won the MLL title in 1935 and 1936. The 2012 Argonaut Boys team won the Sac-Joaquin Section title.

The Argonaut Girls Golf team has been very strong as of late. The 2022 team won the MLL title as well as the Sac-Joaquin Section Division V title. The 2023 team went 15–0 in league to win its second consecutive MLL title as well as winning the Sac Joaquin Section Division V title for the second year in a row. The Argonaut Girls Golf Team became the second Argonaut team (2019/2020 Girls Basketball) to go back-to-back in regards to Sac Joaquin section titles. The Argonaut Boys Golf Team won their first league title by going 14-0 in 2026 claiming the Sierra Valley Conference title.

Argonaut won its first Sac-Joaquin section title in 1990 in Division III baseball under the coaching of Dave Gonzales and won the title again in 1992. Since then, the Mustangs have won section titles in Softball (1998, 2017, 2025), Football (2004, 2021), Boys Track (2012), Girls Soccer (2016), Girls Basketball (2017, 2019, 2020), Boys Basketball (2018), Co-Ed Team Tennis (2022), and Girls Golf (2022, 2023). Argonaut's teams have won a total of 16 Sac Joaquin section titles which is the most of any Amador County High School.

Argonaut competes in the Sierra Valley Conference. The Sierra Valley Conference consists of Amador, Galt, Liberty Ranch, El Dorado, Union Mine, Bradshaw Christian, and Rosemont.

Argonaut (Jackson) High had participated in the Mother Lode League since 1929. Schools in the MLL included Amador (Sutter), Bret Harte, Calaveras, Sonora, and Summerville. Other schools that have formerly participated in the MLL were Ione, Linden, Brookside Christian, El Dorado, and Lincoln of Stockton. The 2023–24 season was Argonaut's final season in the MLL. After 94 years and as charter members of the MLL, Argonaut moved to the Sierra Valley Conference.

== Band ==
The Argonaut High School band has performed in many local events, such as parades and fundraisers, and in school activities including rallies and football games. The Argonaut band visits and plays at Disneyland every two years, as well as at the Forum Music Festival in the Bay Area. Every year, the band performs during winter and spring concerts, including in a community concert located at Amador High School formally called the "Amador Music Festival" or informally as "Mega Band," where Argonaut combines with other school bands in the county.

== History ==
The current Argonaut High School originally opened as Jackson High School in January 1912. Jackson High's main school building is the Spanish style building currently occupied by the Amador County Unified School District at 217 Rex Ave. The rest of the school includes the site of current Jackson Junior High to include the gym and football/baseball field. Jackson High School's mascot was the Tigers and the school colors were Green and White. Jackson High was relocated to its current location, opening in September 1976. In 1983, the ACUSD decided to close Ione High School and merge Jackson and Ione together. The fall of 1983 would be the first official year of what would become Argonaut. The Ione campus would be shut down and its students moved to Jackson. Upon the move, the ACUSD decided to change the schools name to Argonaut, against the wishes of the students who voted to name the school Jackson-Ione High. The name Argonaut was not official until early October of 1983. It was decided that the new Argonaut would maintain the mascot of Ione High, the Mustangs, and the colors of Jackson, green, white, and yellow.

== Notable alumni ==
- Ernie "Tiny" Bonham - Ione High 1932 - MLB baseball player, New York Yankees & Pittsburgh Pirates (1940–49). World Series Champion 1941 and 1943. MLB All-Star 1942 and 1943.
- Vance Mueller - Jackson High 1982 - NFL football player Los Angeles Raiders 1986–1991.
