= F. Carlton Ball =

American artist (1911–1992)

- Born: Frederick Carlton Ball; April 2, 1911; Sutter Creek, California, U.S.
- Died: June 5, 1992 (aged 81); Tacoma, Washington, U.S.
- Other name: Fred Carlton Ball
- Education: Sacramento Junior College; University of Southern California (B.A.; M.A.)
- Occupations: Artist, painter, potter, sculptor, jeweler, educator, author
- Spouses: Mary Ann Ellison Ball, Kathryn Uhl Ball

Frederick Carlton Ball (April 2, 1911 – June 5, 1992) was an American multidisciplinary artist, author, and educator, who worked as a potter, painter, and jeweler. Ball was the first ceramicist to make large-scale thrown pots in California starting around 1935. He taught at the California College of Arts and Crafts, Mills College, Southern Illinois University, the University of Puget Sound, and the University of Wisconsin. He was elected to the American Craft Council College of Fellows in 1983

== Early life and education ==
Frederick Carlton Ball was born in April 2, 1911, in Sutter Creek, California.

Ball attended Sacramento Junior College (now Sacramento City College), before transferring to the University of Southern California (USC). At USC, he studied painting (specifically focused on frescos) and ceramics; and graduated with a B.A. degree (1932), and a M.A. degree (1934). He took classes with ceramicist Glen Lukens.

== Career ==
Ball had worked in ceramics design collaboration with painters, including his third wife Kathryn Uhl Ball, and with Aaron Bohrod. In the 1930s and 1940s, Ball created large thrown pots, and he gave technical help to other potters.

Ball taught pottery and jewelry design at the California College of Arts and Crafts (now California College of the Arts; from 1935 to 1938); Mills College (now Mills College at Northeastern University); the Southern Illinois University; the University of Puget Sound; and the University of Wisconsin. He also taught design courses at Sacramento Evening High School, and at Tacoma Community College. He was an early contributor to Ceramics Monthly magazine, and wrote more than 140 technical articles.

Ball died on June 5, 1992 in Tacoma, Washington. His work can be found in public museum collections including at the Museum of Arts and Design, the Art Institute of Chicago the Everson Museum of Art, and the Oakland Museum of California.

== Publications ==
- Ball, F. Carlton (1967). Decorating Pottery with Clay, Slip, and Glaze. Professional Publications.
- Ball, F. Carlton (1971). Syllabus for Beginning Pottery. Keramos Books. ISBN 9788799001125.
