= Charles B. Hanford =

American actor

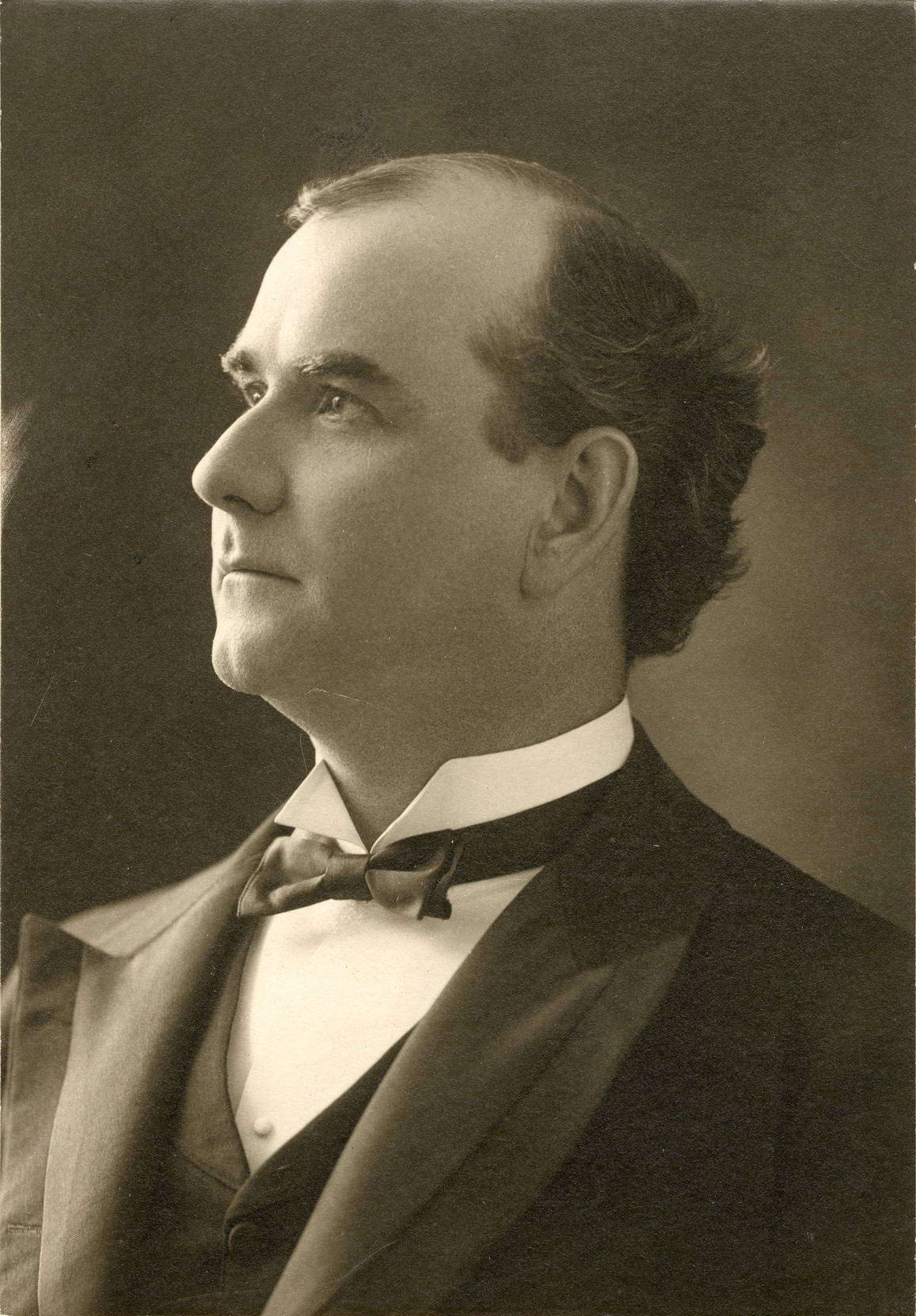
Charles B. Hanford

Charles Barnum Hanford (May 5, 1859 – October 16, 1926) was an American stage actor, known as one of the most popular American Shakespearean actors of his time. After an early career working with leading actors such as Edwin Booth, Thomas W. Keene, and Julia Marlowe, he established his own company and appeared often opposite his wife, the actress Marie Drofnah.

== Early life and career ==
Hanford was born at Sutter Creek, California, on May 5, 1859, son of Levi and Lucy (Barnum) Hanford. As a youth his family moved to Loudoun County, Virginia, where he was raised. He moved to Washington, D.C., in 1879, graduated from the D.C. Boys High School, and for a time pursued the study of law at Columbia College and Columbia Law School, leaving to enter show business. From 1880 to 1882 he was a clerk in the United States Geological Survey and the United States Pension Office, and subsequently a private secretary to Congressman H. F. Page of California.

He became connected with the company of William Stafford, then touring in Shakespearean plays, at New London, Connecticut, in September, 1882. From 1883 to 1885 he played with Thomas W. Keene; from 1885 to 1886 with Robson and Crane, and from 1886 to 1887 with Edwin Booth. He played important parts with Booth and Lawrence Barrett from 1887 to 1889; was a member of the supporting company of Booth and Helena Modjeskain 1889-90, and with Julia Marlowe during 1890 and until 1892. Upon the death of Barrett and the retirement of Booth, Hanford bought their scenic equipment for the play Julius Caesar, and starred as Mark Antony during the season of 1892-'93.

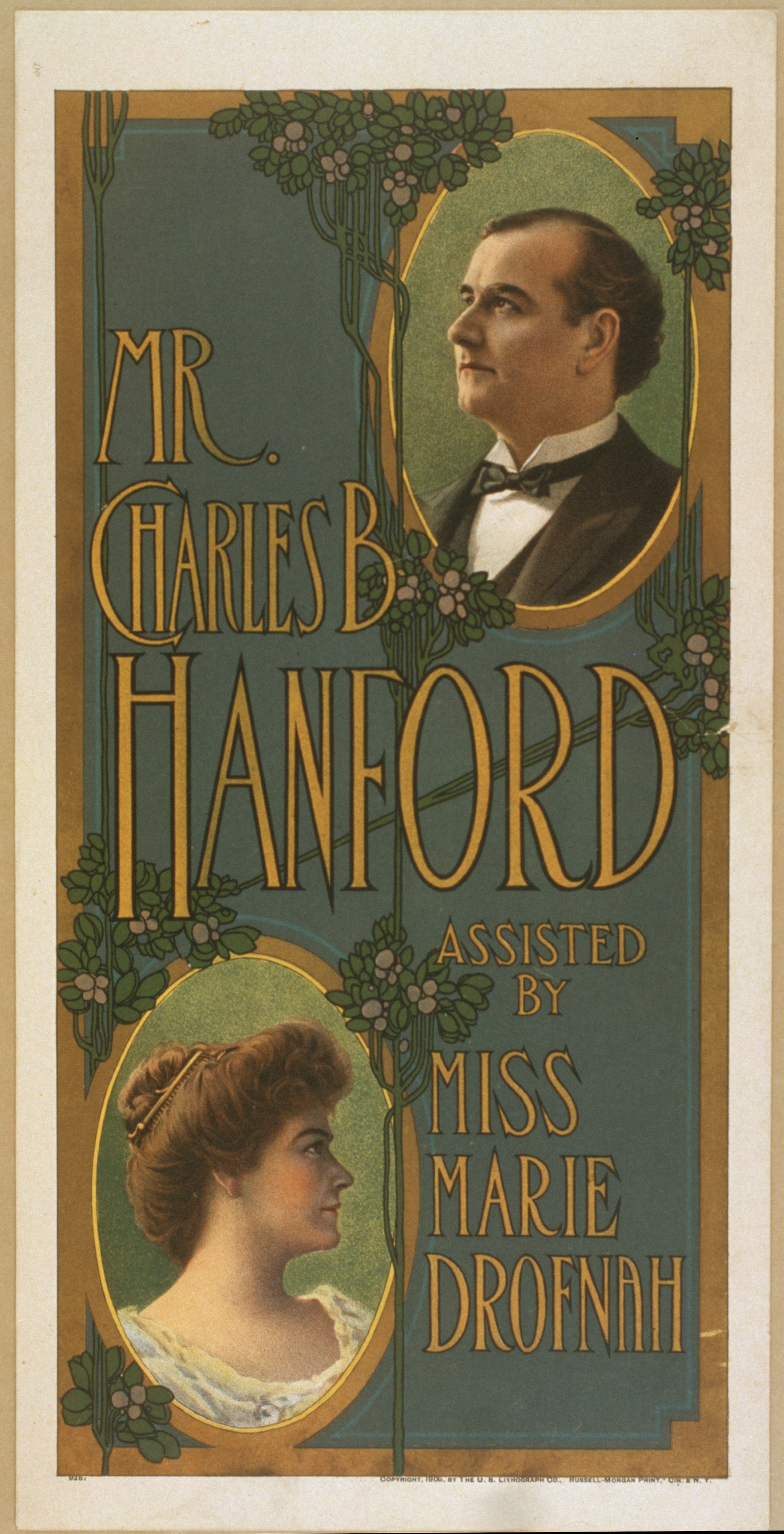
Hanford and his wife, Marie Drofnah, were common co-stars

He starred in various Shakespearean and other productions beginning 1892; was manager and sub-star with Keene from 1896 to 1898; starred with Odette Tyler and R. D. MacLean in 1898 to 1899, and with Louis James and Kathryn Kidder from 1899 to 1900.

== Later career ==
Since about 1900 Hanford headed his own company, starring principally in Shakespearean plays. In the spring of 1899 he produced for the first time the play Private John Allen, by Lee Arthur, at Washington's Columbia Theatre, playing the title role and being assisted by the Frawley Stock Company. During the season he produced the same piece with his own company.

On June 30, 1885, he married schoolteacher Mariella Twaddell Bear, who later often joined him on the stage, adopting the stage name Marie Drofnah (Hanford spelled backwards).

In 1910 he starred in George Broadhurst's The American Lord.

In 1912 he was secured as director of the Feature Film Manufacturing Company, in D.C., a company formed to produce film adaptions of classic plays.

Hanford bore a physical resemblance to the politician William Jennings Bryan, and once impersonated Bryan at a Gridiron Club dinner, occupying the former's seat for two hours. The hoax was only revealed when the real Bryan arrived and confronted Hanford.

His last active stage season was 1913-1914, after which he largely retired from the stage. During World War I he assisted the inventor Thomas Edison in designing camouflage for troops and vessels. He died at his Washington, D.C. home in 1926 following a year of poor health.
