= Sutter Creek (California) =

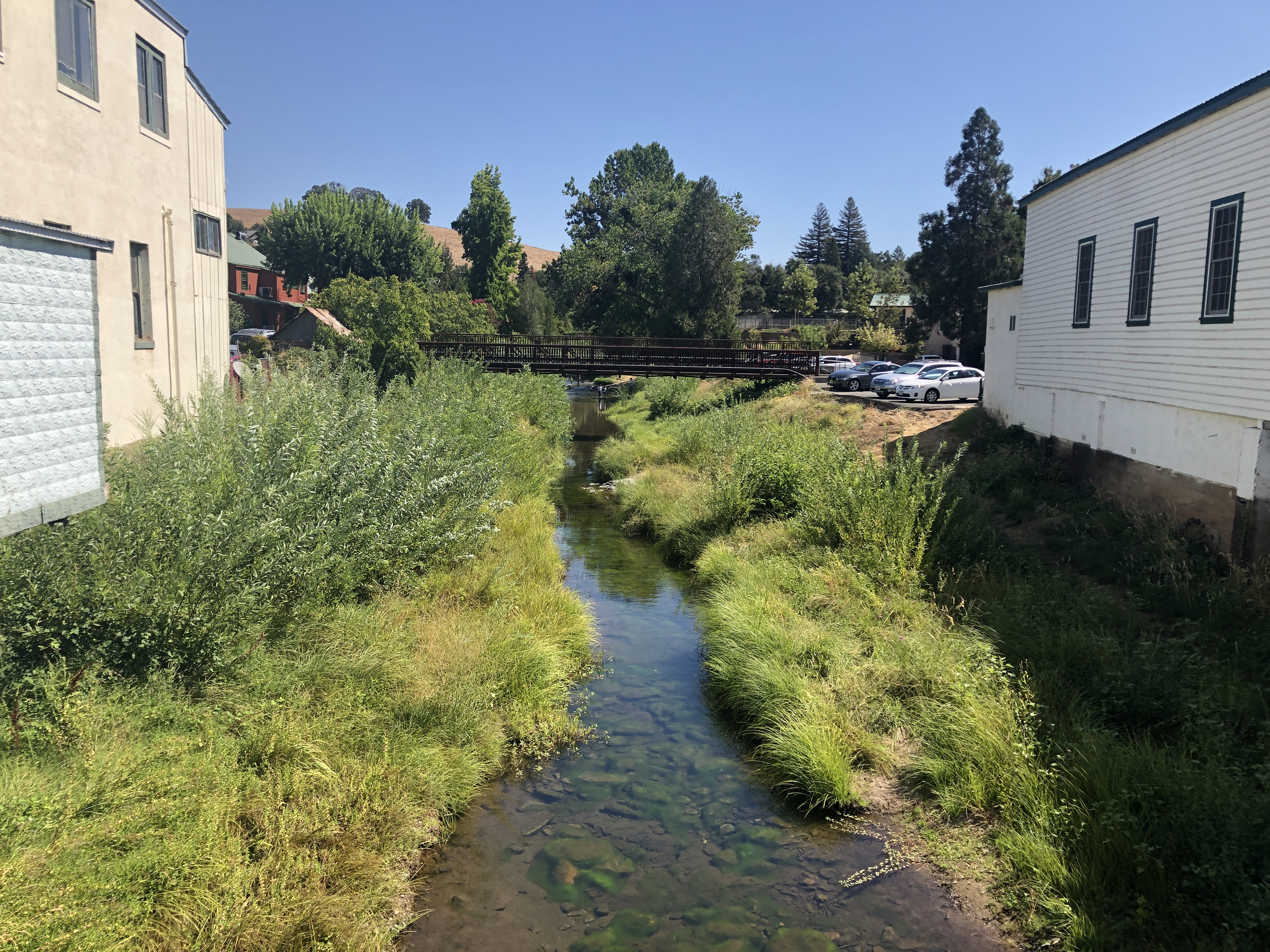
- Sutter Creek in downtown Sutter Creek

- Location within California Location within the United States

Physical characteristics
- Source
  - coordinates: 38.4987973°N 120.5371482°W
- Mouth
  - coordinates: 38.3596355°N 120.9929972°W

Sutter Creek is a stream in the U.S. state of California. The 32-mile (51 km) long stream is a tributary to Dry Creek.

Sutter Creek was named after John Sutter, a prospector who arrived to the area in 1848, and who was a central figure to the California Gold Rush.
