= Sutter Creek, California =

City in California, United States

- City
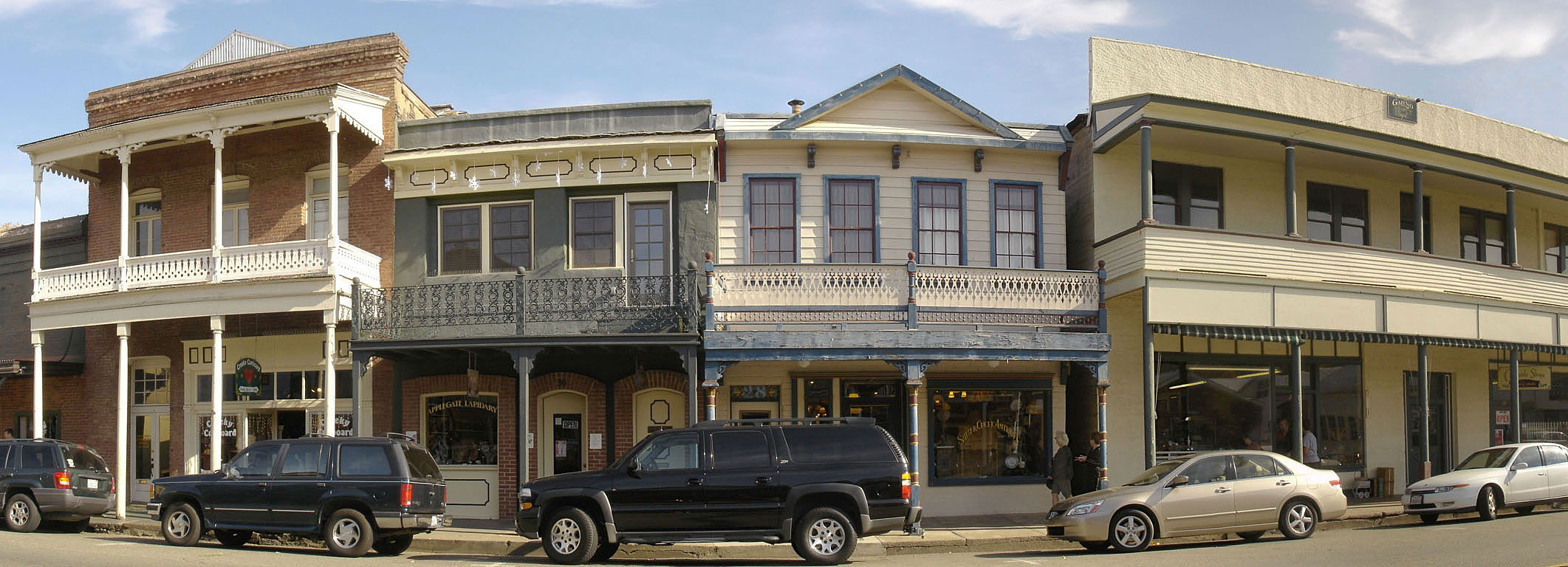
- A view of Main Street (Old Highway 49) in Sutter Creek
- Nickname: Jewel of the gold country
- Interactive map of Sutter Creek, California
- Location in California Sutter Creek, California (the United States)
- Coordinates: 38°23′35″N 120°48′09″W
- Country: United States
- State: California
- County: Amador
- Settled: 1848
- Incorporated: February 11, 1913

Government
  - Mayor: Claire Gunselman
  - State Senate: Marie Alvarado-Gil (R)
  - State Assembly: Heather Hadwick (R)
  - U. S. Congress: Tom McClintock (R)

Area
  - Total: 2.70 sq mi (6.99 km^{2})
  - Land: 2.70 sq mi (6.99 km^{2})
  - Water: 0 sq mi (0.00 km^{2}) 0%
- Elevation: 1,188 ft (362 m)

Population (2020)
  - Total: 2,646
  - Density: 980/sq mi (379/km^{2})
- Time zone: UTC-8 (PST)
  - Summer (DST): UTC-7 (PDT)
- ZIP code: 95685
- Area code: 209
- FIPS code: 06-77392
- GNIS feature IDs: 277620, 2412019
- Website: www.cityofsuttercreek.org

California Historical Landmark
- Reference no.: 322

Sutter Creek (formerly spelled Sutter's Creek and Suttercreek; formerly named Suttersville) is a city in Amador County, California, United States. The population was 2,646 at the 2020 census, up from 2,501 at the 2010 census. It is accessible via State Route 49.

== History ==
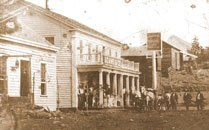
Sutter Creek in 1853

The community takes its name from nearby Sutter Creek, which in turn has the name of early California developer John Sutter.

Sutter's discovery of gold at nearby Coloma in January 1848 triggered the California Gold Rush. After all his workers left him to go on their own hunts for gold, Sutter moved to Mormon Island with a couple of hands. After about two weeks, miners flooded the island, so Sutter and his hands left and returned to Sutter Creek. Sutter said: "I broke up the camp and started on the march further south, and located my next camp on Sutter Creek, now in Amador County, and thought that I should be there alone. The work was going on well for a while, until three or four traveling grog-shops surrounded me, at from one-half to ten miles (16 km) distance from the camp. Then, of course, the gold was taken to these places, for drinking, gambling, etc., and then the following day they were sick and unable to work, and became deeper and more indebted to me, particularly the Kanakas [native Hawaiians]." Shortly thereafter, Sutter moved out of Sutter Creek and back to his fort.

Sutter Creek became a destination for fortune hunters. A post office was established in 1852, and Sutter Creek became a town in 1854 that incorporated in 1913.

Although plenty of placer gold was found there, gold-bearing quartz deposits were discovered in 1851, and mining those deposits for gold became the mainstay of the local economy for many years. With the prosperity brought by quartz mining, Sutter Creek became a boomtown. By 1932, the Central Eureka mine, begun in 1869, had reached the 2,300-foot (700 m) level. By 1939, it was the best-paying mine in Sutter Creek. The mines continued operations until 1942, when most gold mines were closed for manpower reasons during World War II.

Today, Sutter Creek is a tourist town with many shops and restaurants. The town itself is registered as California Historical Landmark #322.

== Geography ==
According to the United States Census Bureau, the city has a total area of 2.7 square miles (7.0 km^{2}), all land.

=== Climate ===
According to the Köppen Climate Classification system, Sutter Creek has a hot-summer Mediterranean climate, abbreviated "Csa" on climate maps. Summers are long and hot, while winters are cool but relatively short. As typical of mediterranean climates, precipitation is concentrated to winter months, with summers being extremely dry.

Climate data for Sutter Hill Ranger Station
| Month | Jan | Feb | Mar | Apr | May | Jun | Jul | Aug | Sep | Oct | Nov | Dec | Year |
|---|---|---|---|---|---|---|---|---|---|---|---|---|---|
| Record high °F (°C) | 68 (20) | 73 (23) | 81 (27) | 92 (33) | 100 (38) | 106 (41) | 110 (43) | 107 (42) | 104 (40) | 99 (37) | 89 (32) | 70 (21) | 110 (43) |
| Mean daily maximum °F (°C) | 53.8 (12.1) | 56.8 (13.8) | 61.9 (16.6) | 65.7 (18.7) | 76.5 (24.7) | 86.2 (30.1) | 92.9 (33.8) | 91.6 (33.1) | 86.5 (30.3) | 74.7 (23.7) | 62.0 (16.7) | 54.2 (12.3) | 71.9 (22.2) |
| Daily mean °F (°C) | 45.9 (7.7) | 48.4 (9.1) | 51.8 (11.0) | 54.6 (12.6) | 63.6 (17.6) | 71.5 (21.9) | 78.0 (25.6) | 76.7 (24.8) | 72.6 (22.6) | 63.0 (17.2) | 53.2 (11.8) | 46.5 (8.1) | 60.5 (15.8) |
| Mean daily minimum °F (°C) | 38.0 (3.3) | 40.0 (4.4) | 41.7 (5.4) | 43.7 (6.5) | 50.8 (10.4) | 57.0 (13.9) | 62.8 (17.1) | 61.6 (16.4) | 58.8 (14.9) | 51.3 (10.7) | 44.4 (6.9) | 38.8 (3.8) | 49.1 (9.5) |
| Record low °F (°C) | 23 (−5) | 26 (−3) | 28 (−2) | 29 (−2) | 31 (−1) | 41 (5) | 42 (6) | 47 (8) | 44 (7) | 32 (0) | 28 (−2) | 20 (−7) | 20 (−7) |
| Average precipitation inches (mm) | 5.19 (132) | 4.41 (112) | 3.84 (98) | 2.76 (70) | 1.07 (27) | 0.32 (8.1) | 0.01 (0.25) | 0.12 (3.0) | 0.29 (7.4) | 1.72 (44) | 3.62 (92) | 5.22 (133) | 28.55 (725) |
| Average snowfall inches (cm) | 0.4 (1.0) | 0.2 (0.51) | 0.1 (0.25) | 0 (0) | 0 (0) | 0 (0) | 0 (0) | 0 (0) | 0 (0) | 0 (0) | 0 (0) | 0.1 (0.25) | 0.9 (2.3) |
| Average precipitation days | 10 | 10 | 9 | 6 | 4 | 1 | 0 | 1 | 1 | 4 | 7 | 10 | 63 |
Source: Western Regional Climate Center

== Demographics ==
Historical population
| Census | Pop. | Note | %± |
|---|---|---|---|
| 1880 | 1,324 | | — |
| 1890 | 1,351 | | 2.0% |
| 1920 | 920 | | — |
| 1930 | 1,013 | | 10.1% |
| 1940 | 1,134 | | 11.9% |
| 1950 | 1,151 | | 1.5% |
| 1960 | 1,161 | | 0.9% |
| 1970 | 1,508 | | 29.9% |
| 1980 | 1,705 | | 13.1% |
| 1990 | 1,835 | | 7.6% |
| 2000 | 2,303 | | 25.5% |
| 2010 | 2,501 | | 8.6% |
| 2020 | 2,646 | | 5.8% |
U.S. Decennial Census

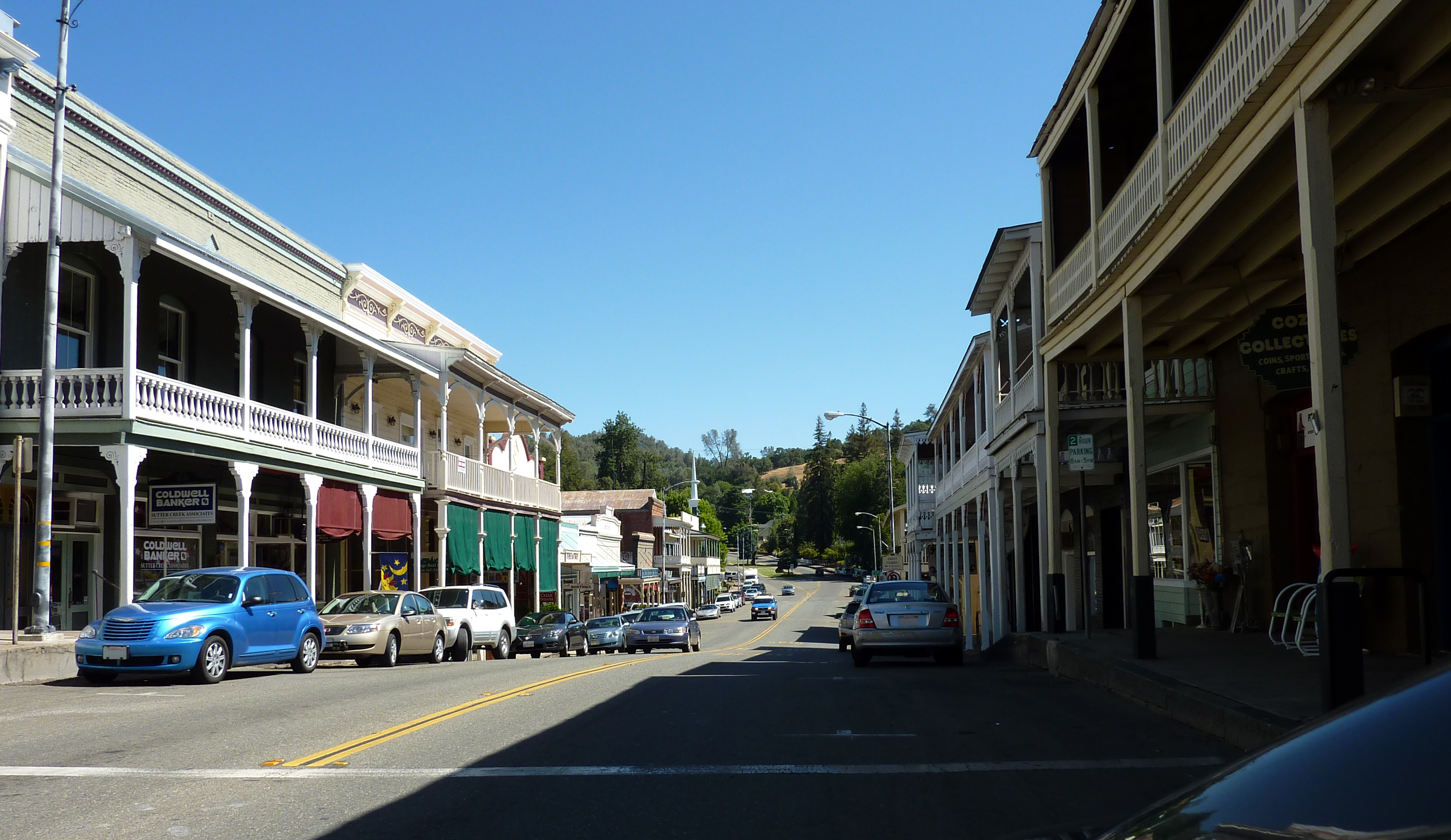
Old Route 49

=== 2020 census ===
As of the 2020 census, Sutter Creek had a population of 2,646, and a population density of 980.7 inhabitants per square mile (378.7/km^{2}).

The age distribution was 18.7% under the age of 18, 6.7% aged 18 to 24, 20.0% aged 25 to 44, 25.6% aged 45 to 64, and 29.0% who were 65 years of age or older. The median age was 49.2 years. For every 100 females, there were 87.4 males, and for every 100 females age 18 and over, there were 83.5 males age 18 and over.

97.8% of residents lived in urban areas, while 2.2% lived in rural areas.

There were 1,265 households, of which 26.0% had children under the age of 18 living in them. Of all households, 40.2% were married-couple households, 6.2% were cohabiting couple households, 19.2% were households with a male householder and no spouse or partner present, and 34.4% were households with a female householder and no spouse or partner present. About 37.3% of all households were made up of individuals, and 21.3% had someone living alone who was 65 years of age or older. There were 720 families (56.9% of all households), and the average household size was 2.09.

There were 1,428 housing units at an average density of 529.3 units per square mile (204.4 units/km^{2}), of which 1,265 (88.6%) were occupied and 11.4% were vacant. Of occupied units, 55.5% were owner-occupied and 44.5% were occupied by renters. The homeowner vacancy rate was 1.0% and the rental vacancy rate was 9.3%.

Racial composition as of the 2020 census
| Race | Number | Percent |
|---|---|---|
| White | 2,166 | 81.9% |
| Black or African American | 17 | 0.6% |
| American Indian and Alaska Native | 58 | 2.2% |
| Asian | 54 | 2.0% |
| Native Hawaiian and Other Pacific Islander | 0 | 0.0% |
| Some other race | 78 | 2.9% |
| Two or more races | 273 | 10.3% |
| Hispanic or Latino (of any race) | 312 | 11.8% |

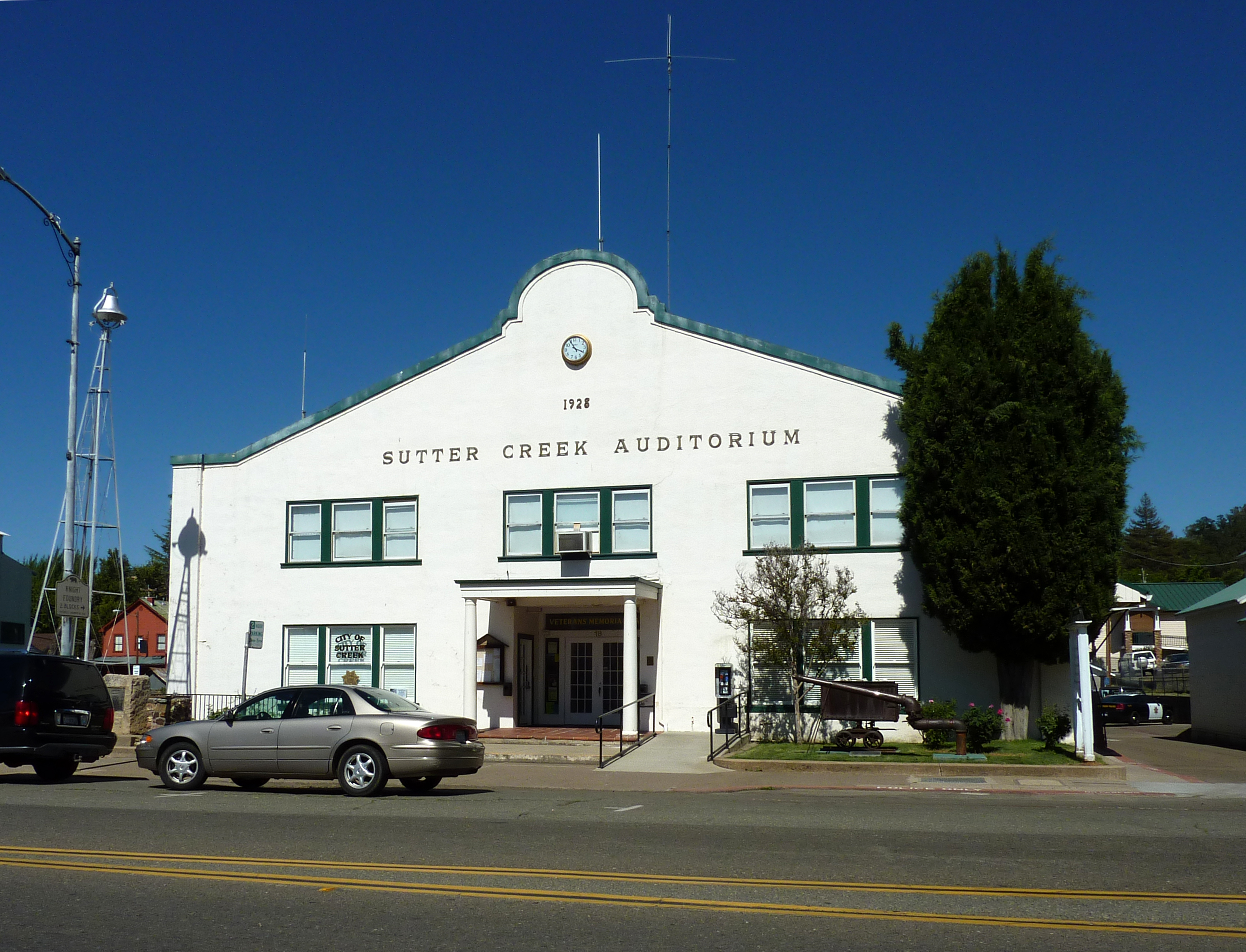
Sutter Creek Auditorium & City Hall also houses the Police Department.

== Politics ==
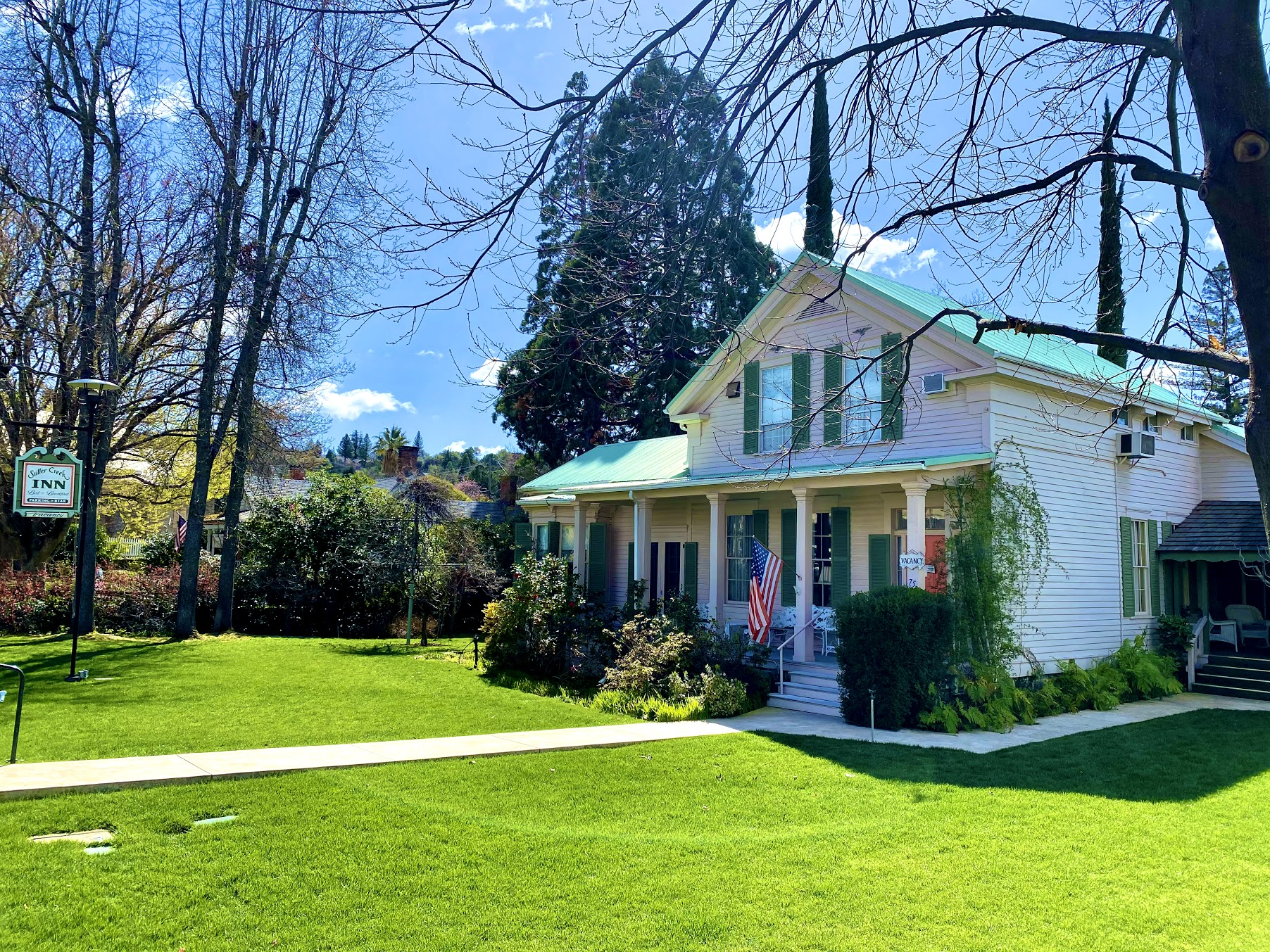
Sutter Creek Inn, Main Street

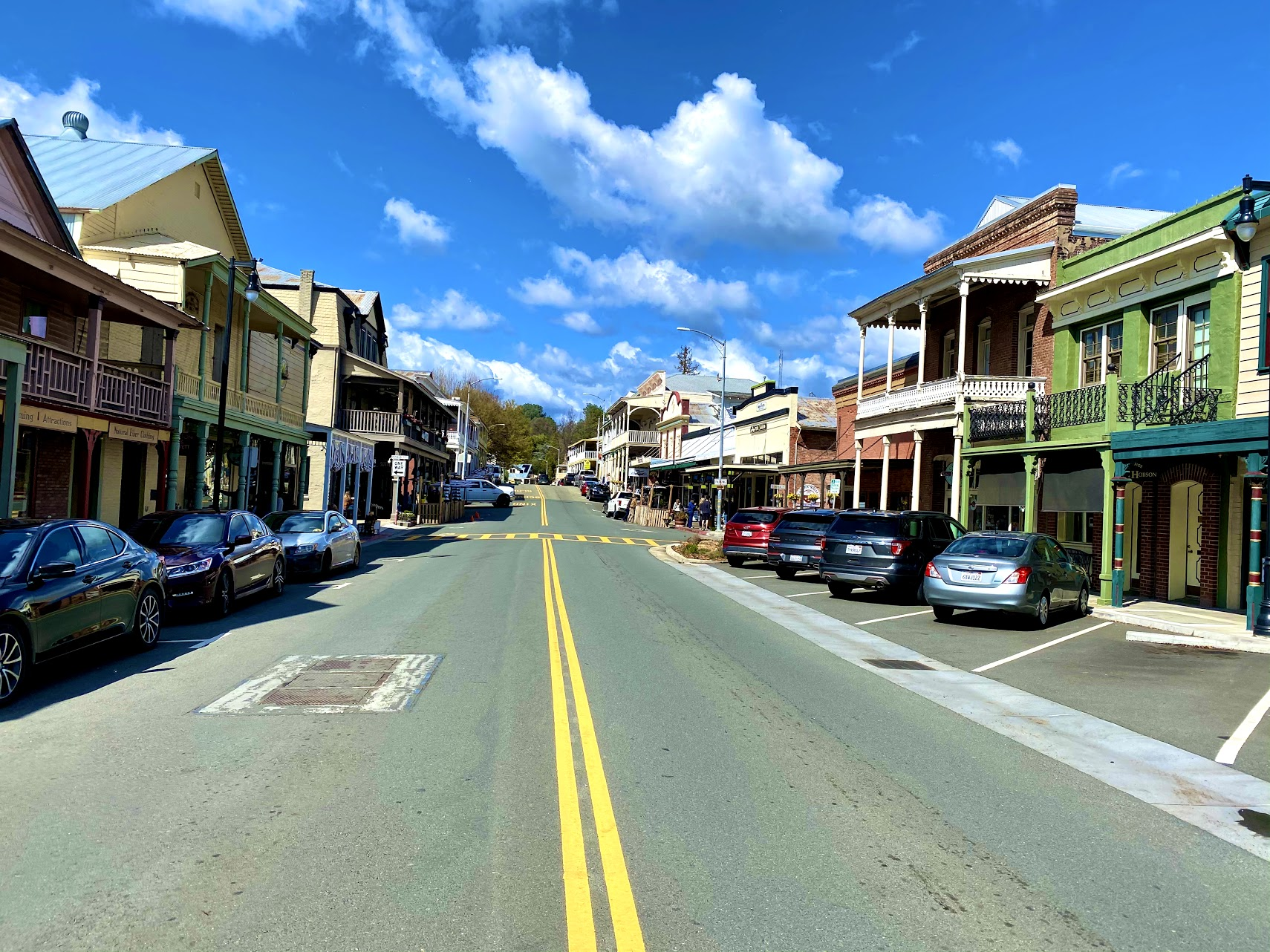
Sutter Creek Main Street

In the state legislature Sutter Creek is in the 4th senatorial district, represented by Republican Marie Alvarado-Gil, and the 1st Assembly district, represented by Republican Heather Hadwick. Federally, Sutter Creek is in California's 5th congressional district, represented by Republican Tom McClintock. The city, as well as Amador County as a whole, consistently votes Republican.

== Landmarks ==
Sutter Creek has two buildings on the National Register of Historic Places:

- Knight Foundry
- Sutter Creek Grammar School

== Notable people ==
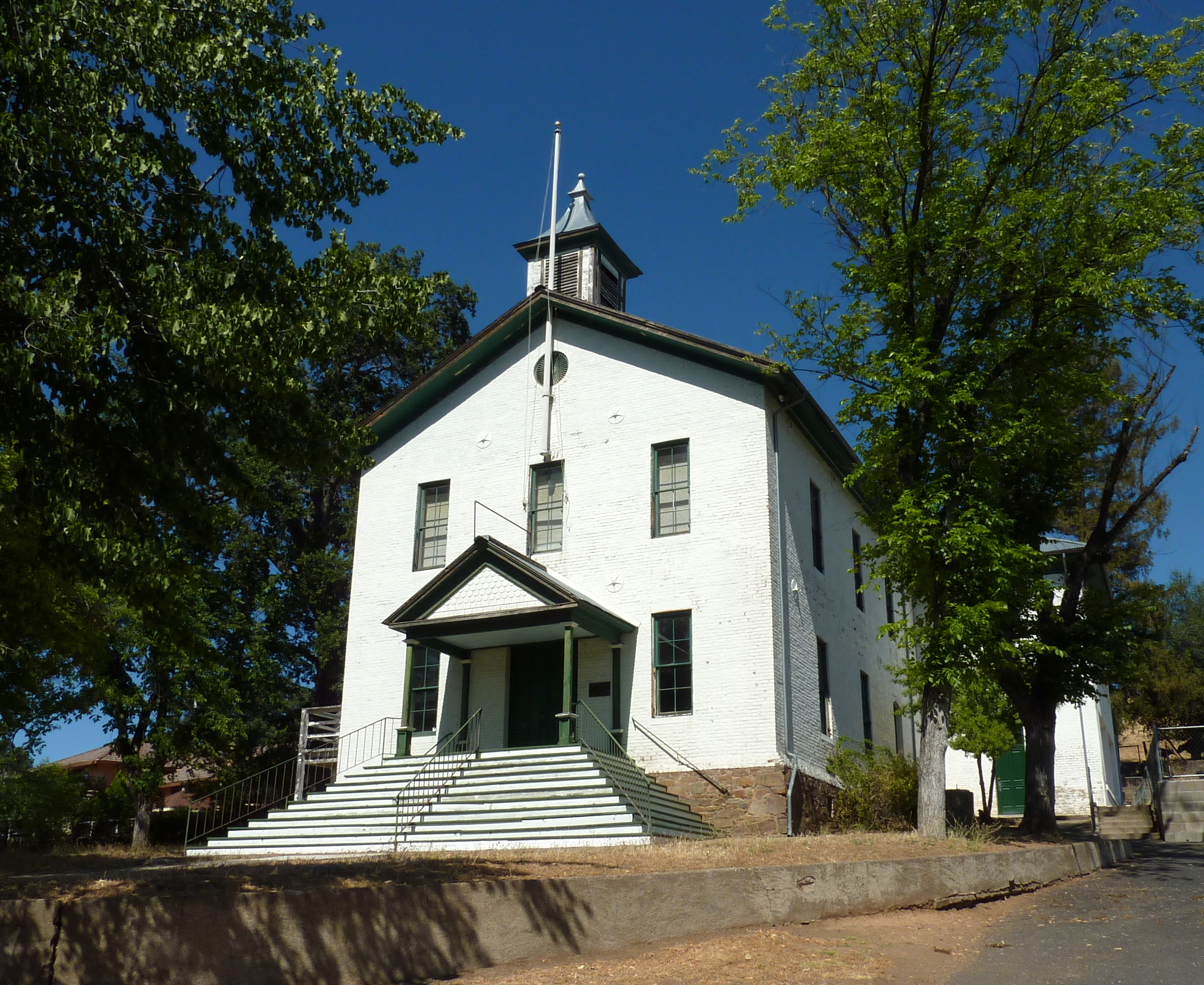
Sutter Creek Grammar School in 2009 is listed on the National Register of Historic Places.

- F. Carlton Ball (1911–1992), multidisciplinary artist, author, and educator, born in Sutter Creek
- Belle Cooledge, first female mayor of Sacramento
- Joseph Eddy Fontenrose (1903–1986), noted socialist and Classical scholar, chaired the department at the University of California Berkeley, born in Sutter Creek
- Charles B. Hanford (1859–1926), Shakespearean actor, born in Sutter Creek
- Leland Stanford, one of Sutter Creek's most famous residents
- John Vukovich, MLB player for various teams, grew up in Sutter Creek and attended Amador High School

== High schools ==
Sutter Creek is home to Amador High School. It has fewer than 1000 students, and competes athletically in the Mother Lode League of the CIF Sac-Joaquin Section.
