= British European Airways =

Airline of the United Kingdom (1946–1974)

- BEA Hawker Siddeley Trident in 1972
IATA	ICAO	Call sign
BE	BEA	BEALINE
- Founded: January 1, 1946
- Ceased operations: March 31, 1974 (merged with BOAC, Cambrian Airways and Northeast Airlines to form British Airways)
- Hubs: London–Heathrow; London–Northolt (until 1954)
- Secondary hubs: Berlin–Tempelhof (1951–1974); Glasgow–Abbotsinch (1966–1974); Glasgow–Renfrew (before 1966); Guernsey; Jersey; Liverpool; London–Croydon (1946–1959); Manchester–Ringway
- Destinations: Europe, North Africa, Middle East
- Headquarters: BEAline House, Ruislip, Hillingdon, England
- Key people: Gerard d'Erlanger; Lord Douglas of Kirtleside; Peter Masefield; Anthony Milward; Henry Marking

British European Airways coat of arms

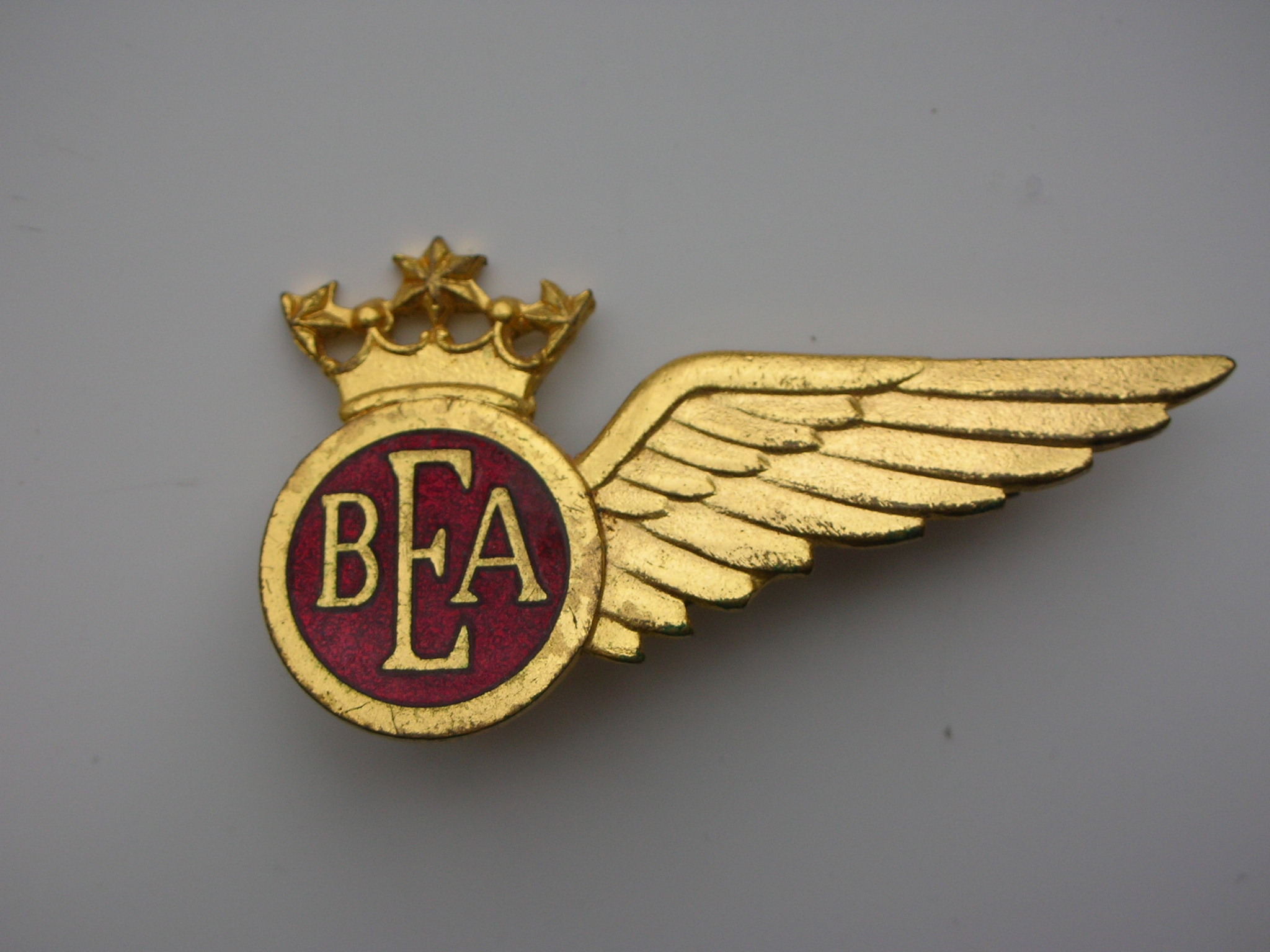
BEA flight attendant lapel badge

British European Airways (BEA), formally British European Airways Corporation, was a British airline which was founded in 1946 and ceased operations in 1974.

BEA operated to Europe, North Africa and the Middle East from airports around the United Kingdom. The airline was also the largest UK domestic operator, serving major British cities, including London, Manchester, Glasgow, Edinburgh and Belfast, as well as areas of the British Isles such as the Highlands and Islands of Scotland, the Channel Islands and the Isle of Man. BEA also operated a network of internal German routes between West Berlin and West Germany as part of the Cold War agreements regulating air travel within Germany. The company slogan was Number One in Europe.

Formed as the British European Airways division of British Overseas Airways Corporation (BOAC) on 1 January 1946, BEA became a crown corporation in its own right on 1 August 1946.

Operations commenced from Croydon and Northolt airports, with DH89A Dragon Rapides and Douglas DC-3s.

Having established its main operating base at Northolt, BEA operated its first service from Heathrow in April 1950; by late 1954, all Northolt operations had moved to Heathrow, which remained the airline's main operating base until the merger with BOAC in 1974.

During 1952, BEA carried its millionth passenger, and by the early 1960s it had become the Western world's (Note: excluding the former Eastern Bloc countries and the People's Republic of China) fifth-biggest passenger-carrying airline (Note: after American Airlines, United Airlines, Eastern Air Lines and Trans World Airlines (TWA)) and the biggest outside the United States.

In 1950, BEA operated the world's first turbine-powered commercial air service with Vickers' Viscount 630 prototype, from London to Paris. The airline entered the jet age in 1960 with de Havilland's DH106 Comet 4B. On 1 April 1964, it became the first to operate the DH121 Trident; on 10 June 1965, a BEA Trident 1C performed the world's first automatic landing during a scheduled commercial air service.

For most of its existence, BEA was headquartered at BEAline House in Ruislip, Hillingdon.

BEA ceased to exist as a separate legal entity on 1 April 1974, when the merger with BOAC to form British Airways (BA) took effect. The name was revived by British Airways from 1991 to 2008 when it changed the name of an existing subsidiary, British Airways Tour Operations Limited to British European Airways Limited. British Airways Tour Operations Limited was itself founded in 1935 as an air travel company, named Silver Wing Surface Arrangements Limited.

== History ==
=== Formation and early years (1946–1950) ===
With the outbreak of war in September 1939 all commercial and private flying within the UK had been severely restricted by the government due to the possibility of civil flights encountering enemy aircraft. To offset this halting of civilian air traffic limited aerial services were instead carried out from 1940 onwards by the state-owned and operated British Overseas Airways Corporation (BOAC) to a number of destinations, both European, and worldwide. On 1 January 1946, the Attlee government lifted wartime restrictions on civil flying in the United Kingdom. Within Europe, this resulted in BOAC resuming Imperial Airways' pre-war routes to continental Europe augmented by Royal Air Force Transport Command non-military flights from Croydon Airport, using Douglas Dakotas in RAF livery flown by crews in RAF uniforms, and UK domestic air services operated by the Associated Airways Joint Committee (AAJC), which had been formed of several pre-war charter companies on 27 June 1940.

BOAC formed a British European Airways division on 1 January 1946, in anticipation of that year's Civil Aviation Act. Following its formation, BOAC's new division began taking over Transport Command's operations from 4 March 1946. On that day, it inaugurated a weekly Dakota service from Northolt to Madrid and Gibraltar, followed by additional Dakota services to Stavanger and Oslo, Copenhagen, as well as Athens via Marseille and Rome. On each of these flights, half of the Dakota's 16 seats were reserved for UK government officials. Initially, crews continued to wear BOAC uniforms. Although some services still used Croydon for some time, the main operating base moved to RAF Northolt.

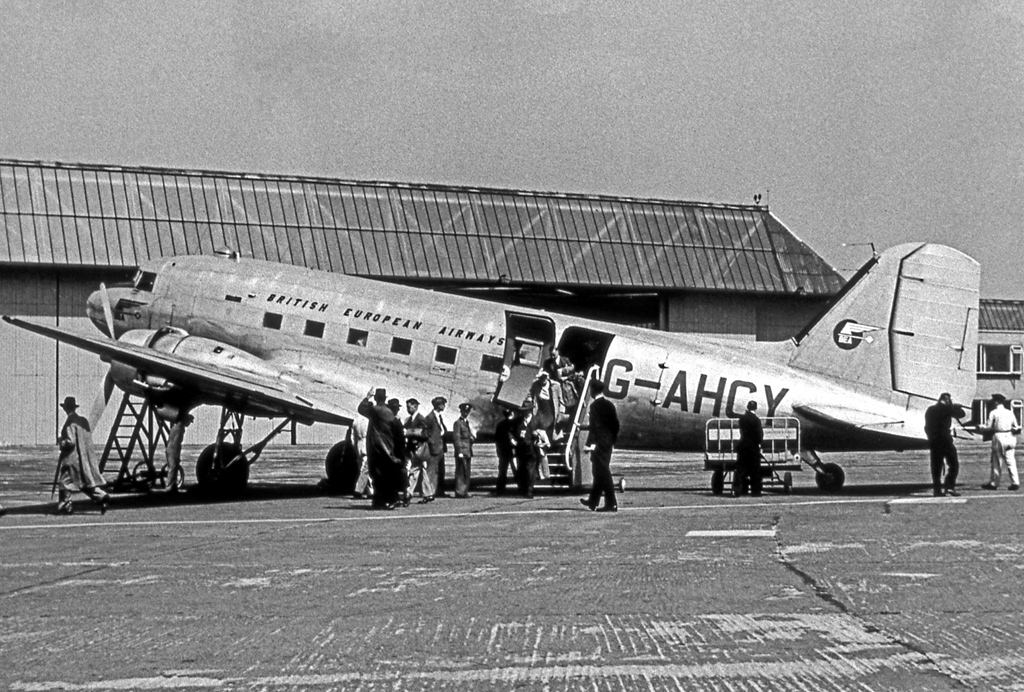
BEA operated many Douglas DC-3s, later naming them Pionairs, between formation in 1946 and disposal of the last in May 1963.

On 1 August 1946, the Civil Aviation Act 1946 was given royal assent and passed into law. This established BEA as a crown corporation in its own right (British European Airways Corporation) and transferred primary responsibility for scheduled air services from the UK to Europe (including the British Isles) to BEA. To fulfill its role as the new short- and medium-haul British flag carrier, BEA was organised into two divisions based at Northolt and Liverpool Speke respectively, with the former responsible for all scheduled services to the Continent and the latter for all scheduled services within the British Isles. The Civil Aviation Act 1946 furthermore provided for nationalisation of private, independent (Note: independent from government-owned corporations) British scheduled airlines and gave BEA a legal monopoly as the sole short-haul scheduled British airline. Due to BEA's inability to take over the UK domestic flights of independent scheduled operators such as Railway Air Services, Allied Airways (Gandar Dower) and British Channel Islands Airways on 1 August, these independents continued to ply their scheduled routes under contract to BEA until they were absorbed into the corporation in 1947.

The first flight operated by the newly constituted British European Airways Corporation departed Northolt for Marseille, Rome and Athens on the day of its formation at 8:40 am. This was followed by further route launches to Amsterdam, Brussels and Lisbon.

Initially, BEA supplemented its ex-RAF Transport Command Dakotas with Dragon Rapides and Avro Nineteens.

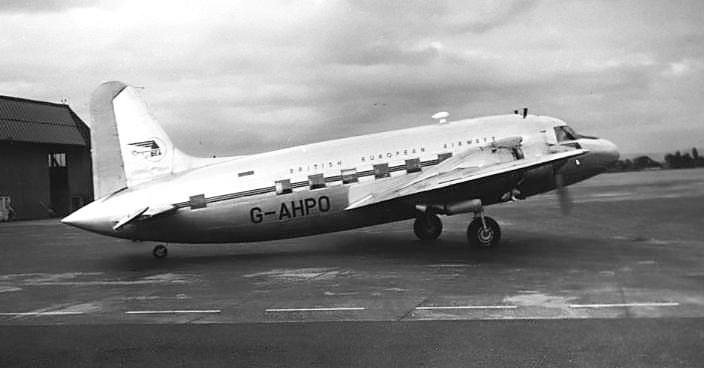
Vickers Viking 1B ("Admiral" class) G-AHPO in BEA's early bare metal finish livery at Manchester, England, in 1952.

Between August and October 1946, BEA took delivery of the first 11 of an eventual 83 Vickers Viking piston-engined airliners. These were BEA's first new aircraft, which it leased from the UK government. The first Viking revenue service departed Northolt for Copenhagen on 1 September 1946. Compared with the Dakota, the Viking took 35 minutes less to reach Copenhagen from London. Following their introduction on the London–Copenhagen route, Vikings began replacing Dakotas on BEA's services to Amsterdam, Oslo, Stockholm, Gibraltar and Prague.

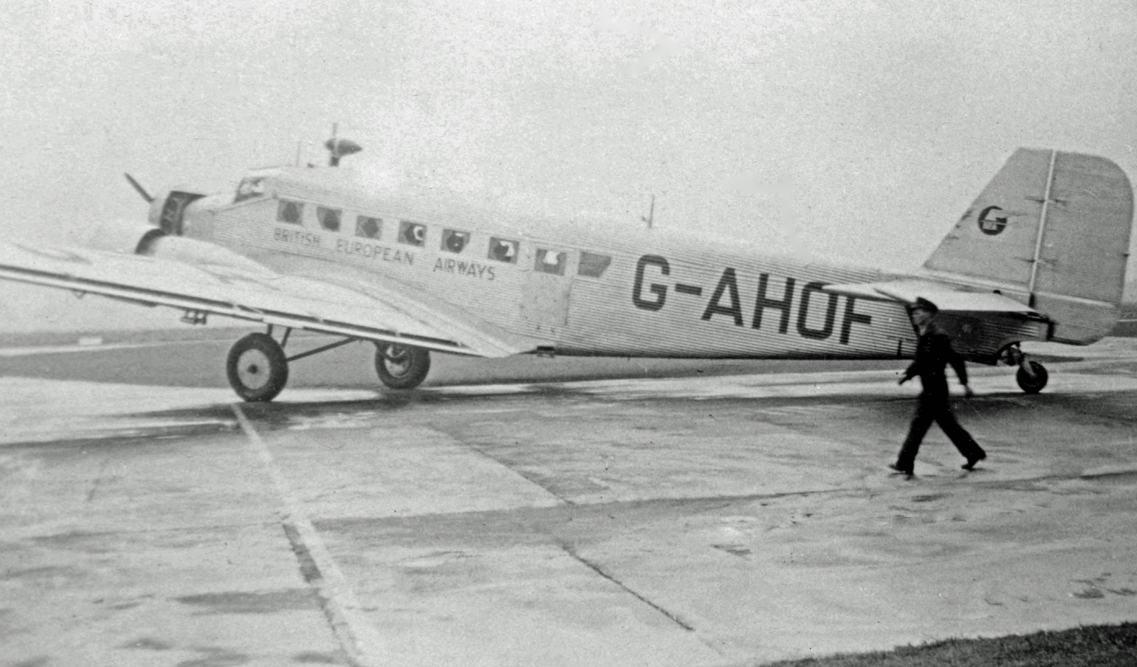
Junkers Ju 52/3m ("Jupiter" class G-AHOF in BEA's early bare metal finish livery at Manchester Ringway, 1947

In November 1946, BEA's first service to Northern Ireland departed Croydon for Belfast (Sydenham) via Liverpool, using an ex-Luftwaffe Junkers Ju 52/3m operated by independent airline Railway Air Services on the fledgling corporation's behalf. The following month, BEA's Belfast operations transferred to Nutts Corner while Dakotas replaced the "Jupiter" class Ju 52s from 1947.

On 1 February 1947, the process of merging the wholly private, independent airlines operating in the UK under the AAJC umbrella into BEA began. Railway Air Services, Isle of Man Air Services, and Scottish Airways (which had been formed in 1937 by merging Northern & Scottish Airways and Highland Airways) were among the first independents merged into the new corporation.

1947 was also the year BEA operated its first scheduled all-cargo flight from Northolt to Brussels with a DC-3 freighter. The same year, it inaugurated a scheduled service between Land's End Airport in southwest Cornwall, England, and St Mary's Airport on the largest island of the Isles of Scilly archipelago off the southwest coast of Cornwall, using "Islander" class Dragon Rapides.

Despite the previous year's nationalisation of several private airlines and their absorption into BEA, the government-owned carrier continued to contract its private sector counterparts to operate a limited number of regional feeder services on its behalf via "associate" agreements. These needed to be approved by the Air Transport Advisory Council (ATAC), the contemporary UK government department in charge of air transport economic regulation. Cambrian and Western Airways were the first two airlines to be given associate status by BEA in May 1948. These arrangements enabled the latter to contract the operation of a new feeder route between Cardiff and Weston-super-Mare to both of the former, which respectively used Dragon Rapides and Avro Ansons to provide a daily service. East Anglian Flying Services (EAFS) was another early BEA associate. The association agreement between BEA and EAFS resulted in the latter operating a Southend–Rochester feeder service on behalf of the former.

1948 was also the year BEA's reservations department moved to new premises at Dorland Hall, Lower Regent Street in London's West End.

BEA made aviation history in 1950 with the world's first turbine-powered commercial air service from London to Paris, using the UK Ministry of Supply-owned Vickers Viscount 630 prototype G-AHRF. By that time, BEA's main operating base at Northolt was the busiest airport in the UK; however, the airline was losing money, which resulted in replacing former BOAC director, Gerard d'Erlanger, who was BEA's first chairman, with Lord Douglas of Kirtleside, as well as appointing Peter Masefield as its new managing director.

In April 1950, BEA operated its first service from London Heathrow Airport.

Following the provisional introduction of the Viscount 630 prototype on the London–Paris and London–Edinburgh routes, BEA ordered 20 Viscount 701s in August 1950 for delivery from 1953. Also in 1950, BEA informed Vickers of its requirement for an aircraft with 10% lower costs per seat-mile than the 800 series Viscount. This provided the impetus for Vickers to begin developing the four-engined Vanguard high-capacity turboprop in 1953.

=== Expansion, modernisation and commercialisation (1951–1960) ===
Peter Masefield's arrival as managing director (MD) in 1950 marked the beginning of BEA's commercialisation. This entailed introduction of new cost control measures and innovative methods to boost revenue and passenger loads, including off-peak fares on late-evening flights and high-frequency services on the London–Paris route. BEA's new commercially aggressive approach soon resulted in monthly earnings of £1 million.

In early 1951, BEA introduced its first "Pionair" class Douglas DC-3, a Scottish Aviation DC-3 conversion featuring British instrumentation and an increased seating capacity of 32. In addition to having 38 DC-3s converted to Pionair passenger carriers, BEA had a further 10 DC-3s modified as "Leopard" class freighters. The same year, BEA introduced its first tourist class on Viking services. This entailed re-configuring a total of 49 aircraft in a 36-seat, single class layout. BEA referred to its re-configured, all-tourist class Vikings as "Admiral" class [aircraft].

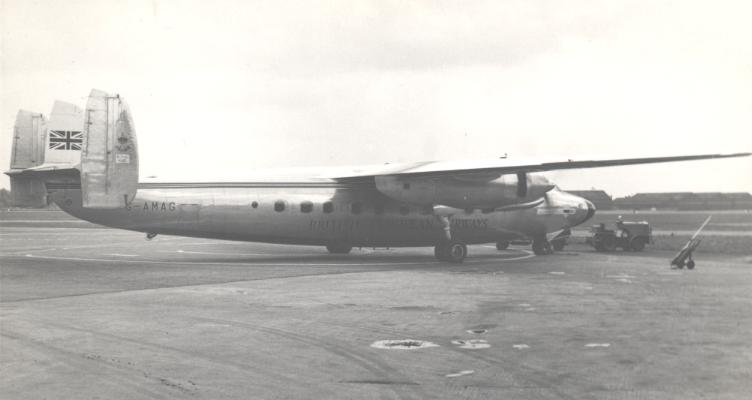
BEA Airspeed Ambassador ("Elizabethan" class) in bare metal finish livery incorporating a burgundy cheatline, a white roof and centre fin at Manchester in 1953

Revenue Passenger-Kilometers, scheduled flights only, in millions
Year	Traffic
1950	417
1955	1108
1960	2132
1965	3717
1969	4881
1971	5360

In 1952, BEA carried its one-millionth passenger and introduced the first of 20 Airspeed Ambassadors. These cost £3 million and featured a 49-seat mixed-class layout. BEA's first commercial Ambassador service left London for Paris on 13 March 1952. Flights to Milan and Vienna began the following month. These aircraft introduced the airline's passengers to new standards of comfort and speed. Compared with BEA's older piston types, the Ambassador's flight time from London to Milan, for example, reduced by two hours. In June 1952 BEA re-launched the pre-war mid-day Silverwing service pioneered by Imperial Airways on the London–Paris route with 40-seat all-first class Ambassadors. The Ambassador was BEA's last major piston-engined type. It referred to the aircraft as "Elizabethan" class to commemorate the accession of Elizabeth II that year. Also in 1952, BEA made Jersey-based independent airline Jersey Airlines an associate to develop a network of routes within the Channel Islands and expand services between the islands and the UK mainland.

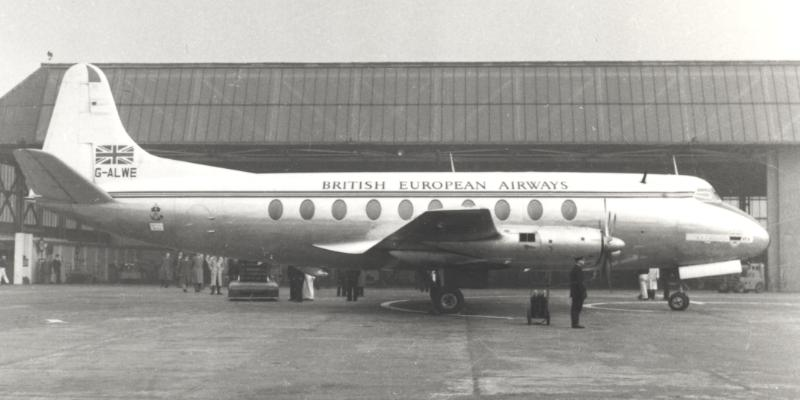
BEA Viscount 701 G-ALWE RMA Discovery in bare metal finish livery incorporating a burgundy cheatline, a white roof and fin at Manchester in 1953. This aircraft crashed on approach to the airport on 14 March 1957.

In 1953, BEA began receiving the first 16 Viscount 701 turboprops it had ordered in August 1950. The first of these "Discovery" class aircraft entered service with 47 mixed-class seats in April 1953, and the first production aircraft (G-AMAV) went on to win the transport class of the 1953 London to Christchurch, New Zealand, air race, with BEA MD Peter Masefield as team manager and co-pilot.

1953 was also the year Flightmaster, BEA's first mechanical reservations system, was installed. This enabled the simultaneous display of seat availability on 32,000 flights.

Between February and April 1954, BEA's expanding Viscount fleet replaced Elizabethans between London, Nice and Rome, and on regional routes from Manchester and Birmingham. By that time, BEA had shifted its main operating base to Heathrow, which became the London terminal for all international flights. Although it continued to use Northolt as a London terminal for domestic flights serving Manchester, Edinburgh, Renfrew (Glasgow), Aberdeen, Belfast and the Channel Islands which by that time were mainly operated by 36-seater "Admiral" class Vikings, these were wound down in favour of concentrating all of BEA's London flights at Heathrow. A Jersey-bound Pionair in October 1954 was BEA's final flight from Northolt.

The Viscount's commercial success had made it the leading short-haul aircraft in Europe in the mid-1950s. This led Lord Douglas to believe that turboprops would continue to be the mainstay of BEA's fleet into the 1960s.

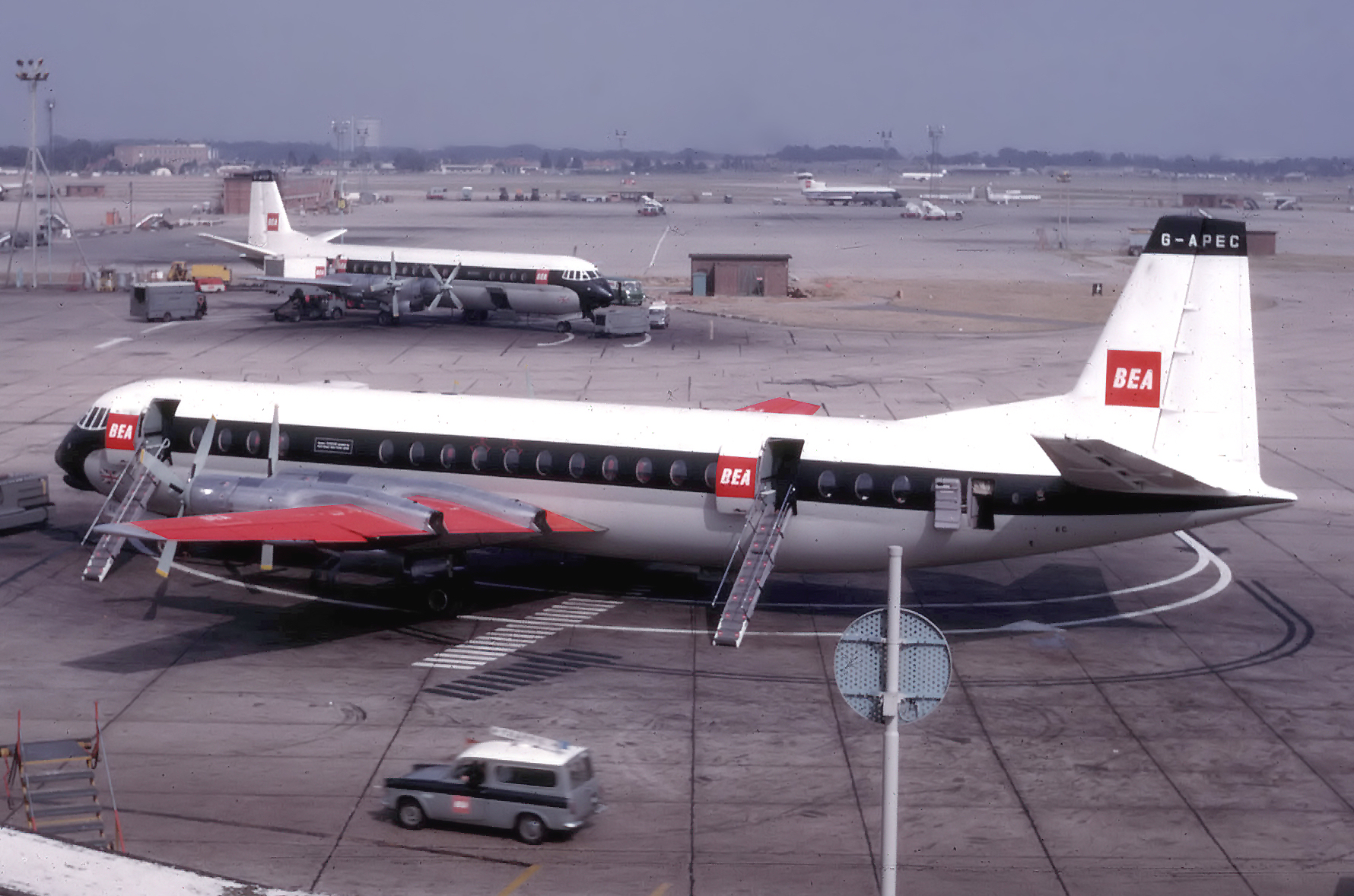
Two BEA Vickers Vanguards in the airline's red, black and white livery sharing the ramp at Heathrow in 1965. The aircraft in the foreground, Vanguard V.951 G-APEC, crashed on 2 October 1971, en route from Heathrow to Salzburg, Austria, with the loss of all on board.

On 31 March 1955, BEA completed its first profitable financial year, recording an operating profit of £552,314 and a net profit of £63,039.

In July 1955, BEA became the launch customer for the Vanguard, Vickers' new high-capacity turboprop powered by four Rolls-Royce RB109 "Tyne" engines. The airline's launch order was for 20 aircraft, including six Vanguard V.951s and 14 heavier V.953s.

In mid-1955, BEA entered into a 10-year operating agreement with its associate Cambrian Airways. This resulted in the latter launching new services from Liverpool and Manchester to Jersey (via Bristol and Cardiff) on behalf of the former.

In its 1955–56 financial year, BEA carried more than two million passengers for the first time at an all-time high average load factor of 69.4%. During that period, it recorded a profit of £603,614, mainly as a result of revenue growth accounted for by the Viscount fleet.

In 1956, BEA acquired a 25% minority shareholding in Jersey Airlines and the corporation's Southampton–Guernsey and Southampton–Alderney routes transferred to the independent. (Note: Southampton–Dinard transferred subsequently as well)

1956 was also the year BEA began using Viscounts for nightfreight operations to increase cargo capacity as well as the aircraft's utilisation. While BEA continued taking delivery of Viscount 701s, it placed its first order for 12 larger 66- to 68-seat Viscount 802/806s. These were delivered from February 1957. By 1958, BEA had 77 Viscounts in service.

On 7 February 1958, BEA acquired a 33⅓% minority shareholding in Welsh independent regional airline Cambrian Airways.

In March 1958, BEA ordered six de Havilland DH106 Comet 4B jet aircraft for delivery from 1960. This was BEA's answer to the impending introduction of the Sud-Est Caravelle, Air France's new short-/medium-range jet, on the French flag carrier's European, North African and Middle Eastern network, including the prime Heathrow – Le Bourget route from July 1959.

The arrival at Heathrow on 30 July 1958, of a BEA Elizabethan from Cologne marked the type's last service with the airline. Although its operating costs on short routes such as London–Paris were lower than the Viscount's, the piston type could not match the turboprop's passenger appeal. Unlike the Pionairs and Leopards, which continued serving regional feeder and freight routes, Elizabethans were deployed on trunk routes where passenger appeal was more important; this further hastened their demise in BEA service.

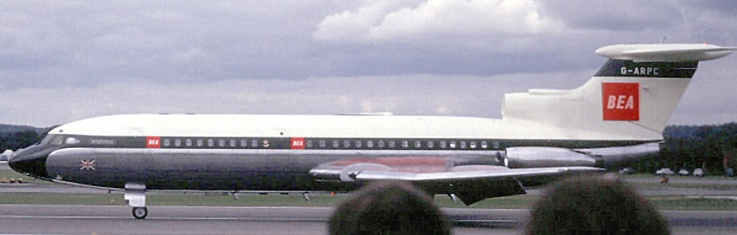
Trident 1C G-ARPC in BEA's red, black and white livery of the late-1950s to late-1960s. Built in 1962, the aircraft was destroyed in a fire at Heathrow in 1975.

On 12 August 1959, BEA signed a £28 million contract for 24 de Havilland DH121 Trident Mark 1(C) "second-generation" jets plus 12 options, making it the launch customer for the world's first commercial T-tailed rear-engined trijet due to enter service in spring 1964. (This version of the Trident was smaller and lighter than de Havilland's original DH121 of 1956. At that time BEA's chairman, Anthony Milward, had insisted that a launch order from BEA depended on scaling down the original design, in the belief that the Vickers Vanguard high-capacity turboprops it had ordered the year before would remain competitive against jets on trunk routes as a result of lower operating and seat-mile costs. BEA's insistence on building the Trident smaller with less powerful engines and a lower fuel capacity than originally proposed was also a manifestation of the cautious attitude of the airline's senior management against a backdrop of a [temporary] reduction in its profit margin and slowdown in its growth rate. Meeting BEA's specifications for the Trident involved reducing the length of the aircraft's fuselage, its wingspan and weight and replacing the Rolls-Royce RB141/3 "Medway" engines with Rolls-Royce RB163 "Speys". Shrinking the original design also reduced seating capacity from 111–130 to 79–90, in mixed- and single-class configuration respectively.)

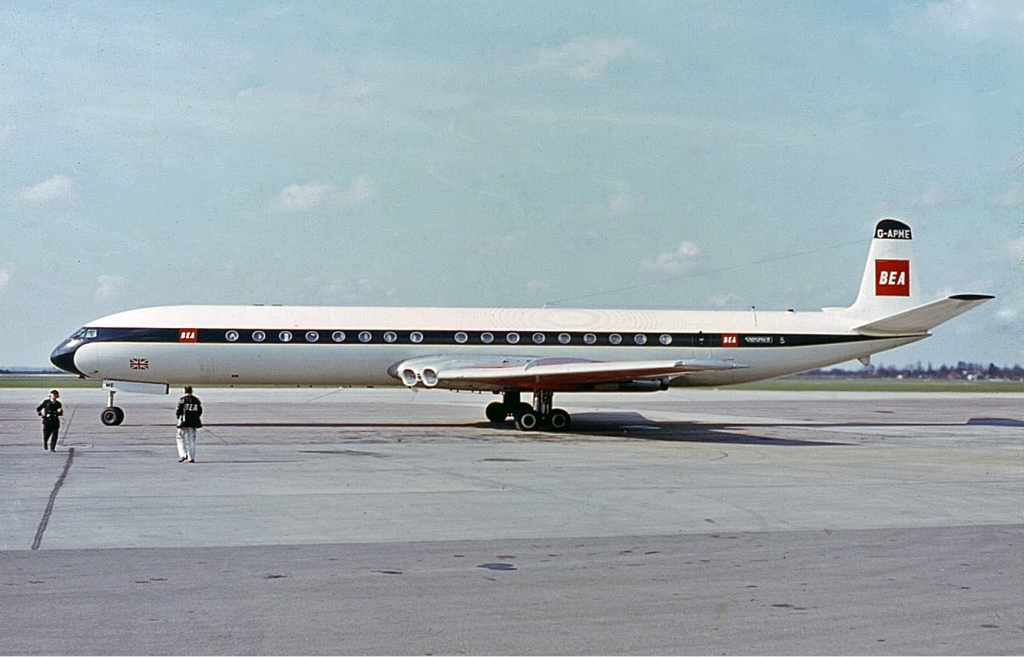
Comet 4B G-APME wearing BEA's red, black and white livery at Bremen Neuenland Airport, Germany, 1969

On 7 November 1959, BEA took delivery of its first Comet 4B (G-APMB), nearly two months ahead of the contracted delivery on 1 January 1960. This was followed by the official handover ceremony of the airline's first jet airliner on 16 November.

In its 1959–60 financial year, BEA carried 3.29 million passengers and recorded a profit of £2.09 million.

On 1 April 1960, BEA began commercial jet operations with its new Comet 4Bs. On that day, the airline commenced jet operations from Heathrow to Athens, Istanbul, Moscow, Munich, Rome and Warsaw with an initial, five-strong Comet fleet. By June, this fleet grew to seven (out of an eventual 18) aircraft, enabling the launch of additional jet services to Copenhagen, Oslo, Stockholm, Düsseldorf, Malta, Zürich and Frankfurt.

On 27 September 1960, BEA welcomed its 25-millionth passenger.

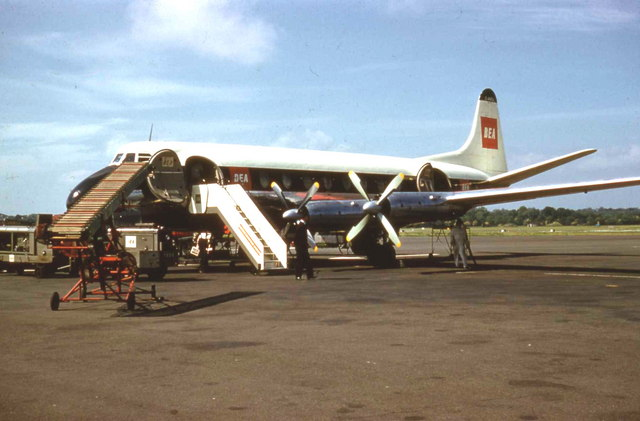
BEA Viscount 701 in the red, black and white livery at Belfast Nutts Corner Airport, 1960

Also in 1960, BEA took delivery of its final two Viscount 701s (Note: on lease from the manufacturer) bringing its total fleet strength of this sub-type to 50.

1960 was furthermore the year the UK Parliament enacted the Civil Aviation (Licensing) Act 1960 (8 & 9 Eliz. 2. c. 38), which abolished the statutory monopoly BEA and BOAC had enjoyed on principal domestic and international scheduled routes since the beginning of the post-war era. In theory, this gave independent airlines equal opportunities to develop scheduled routes in their own right; however, in reality, the corporations would object to applications by independent airlines seeking to be licensed as competitors to the state airlines. Each application by an independent airline for a scheduled route licence was heard by the newly established Air Transport Licensing Board (ATLB), the new UK government body in charge of air transport economic regulation that succeeded ATAC. At these hearings, the independents needed to convince the ATLB that there were sufficient passengers to justify the proposed scheduled services, that these stood a reasonable chance of becoming profitable and that they opened up new markets rather than divert traffic from the corporations to overcome the latter's objections. Although the ATLB granted British Eagle and British United Airways (BUA), BEA's and BOAC's two biggest independent competitors during the 1960s, licences to operate rival international scheduled services on several trunk routes from London Heathrow and Gatwick respectively, these airlines were unable to use them without actual traffic rights. For example, lack of traffic rights prevented BUA from running direct London (Gatwick) – Paris (Le Bourget) scheduled flights although it held a licence for that route, which the ATLB had awarded it in late 1961. In that case, BUA's failure to obtain traffic rights was mainly the result of the French authorities' refusal to grant these without a corresponding reduction in BEA's share of London–Paris flights.

In its 1960–61 financial year, BEA carried 3.99 million passengers at an average load factor of 65% and recorded a loss of £1.75 million.

=== BEA at its peak (1961–1971) ===
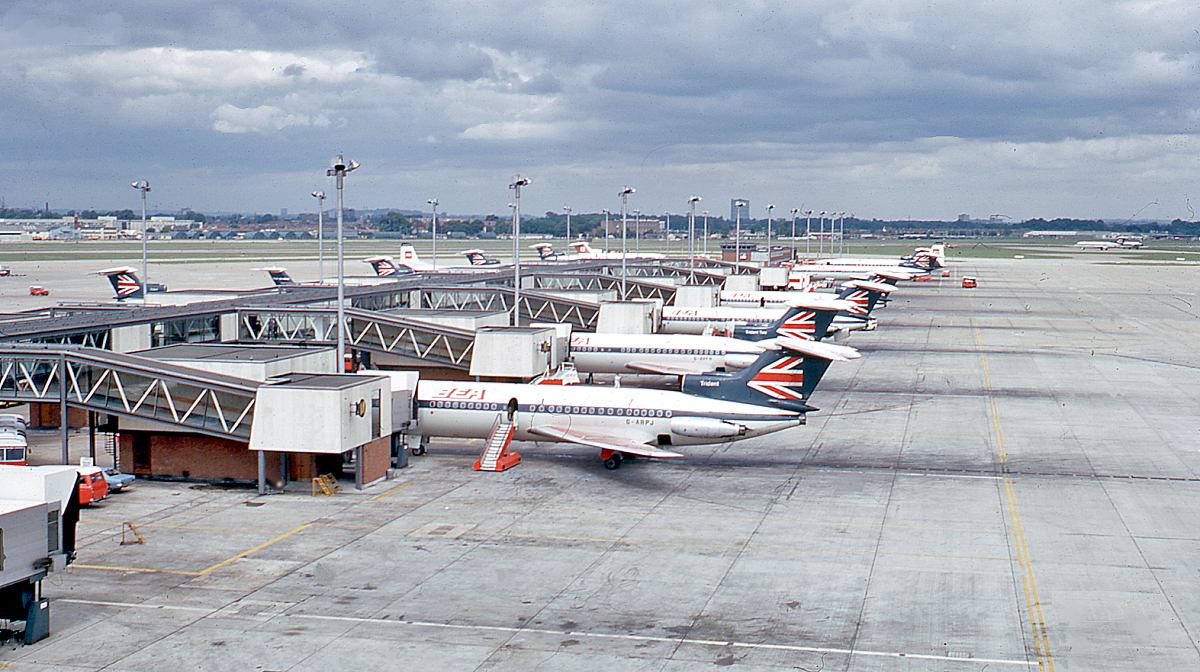
BEA aircraft at Heathrow Terminal 1 in 1971.

By the early 1960s, BEA carried just under four million passengers per year, more than any other airline in Europe (excluding Aeroflot); worldwide (excluding Aeroflot and the Chinese CAAC Airlines), only the "Big Four" US airlines – American Airlines, United Airlines, TWA and Eastern – carried more. By that time BEA served most major European cities, with the network stretching east to Moscow, Kuwait and Doha as well as to North Africa; it was a founder/minority shareholder of Alitalia, Aer Lingus, Cyprus Airways, Gibraltar Airways and Jersey Airlines.

In 1961 BEA placed an order for three Armstrong Whitworth Argosy all-cargo aircraft, the airline's first dedicated freighters; the first one was delivered and entered service later that year.

On 1 March 1961, BEA began Vanguard services following a delay to the aircraft's entry into service, as a result of major defects discovered in its Rolls-Royce Tyne engine's compressor during testing in early 1960. Following their delayed entry into service, BEA's Vanguards began flying to international destinations such as Malta and Barcelona and by 1962, took over about half of the flights previously operated by Viscounts on the airline's UK domestic trunk routes, (Note: Heathrow–Glasgow, Heathrow–Edinburgh, Heathrow–Belfast and Heathrow–Manchester) where they operated in a 132-seat, single-class configuration. The Vanguards' introduction on BEA's Heathrow–Scotland trunk routes increased traffic by more than 20%.

On 1 April 1961, BEA moved some flights to Paris (Le Bourget) and other European destinations from Heathrow to Gatwick in accordance with the wishes of the British government to develop the latter airport.

In 1962, BEA sold its 25% minority holding in Jersey Airlines. This was followed by the BUA group's takeover of Jersey Airlines in May of that year.

On 19 May 1962, Pionair G-ALTT operated the type's final service on BEA's Scottish internal network between Islay, Campbeltown and Glasgow (Renfrew).

In its 1962-63 annual report, BEA estimated that introduction of both the Comet 4B and Vanguard had cost it more than £6 million over a two-year period. The airline considered this "a heavy financial burden" in support of British aircraft manufacturers, which adversely impacted its ability to compete with overseas rivals whose choice of aircraft was not influenced by political considerations.

In November 1963, BEA's independent rival British Eagle became the first independent airline to compete with it on a main UK domestic trunk route, when the independent launched daily scheduled services between London Heathrow and Glasgow with 103-seater, two-class Bristol Britannias. This was followed by daily two-class Britannia services from Heathrow to Edinburgh and Belfast the next day. This was also the first time a scheduled airline had offered a separate first class cabin on a domestic route in the UK. As British Eagle was restricted to a single daily round-trip on each route, it sought to differentiate itself from BEA. While BEA served these routes with 132-seat Vanguards in an all-tourist configuration with minimal onboard catering, British Eagle provided full catering on all flights. British Eagle furthermore differentiated itself from its state-owned competitor by introducing assigned seating and "trickle loading". (Note: whereby passengers take their seats in the aircraft after checking in instead of awaiting their departure inside the airport terminal) The former was a first for a UK scheduled domestic carrier while the airline claimed to have started the latter in the UK as well. BEA, whose frequencies were not restricted, responded to the challenge on its three most important domestic routes by scheduling additional flights that departed and arrived at the same time or within 10 minutes of its rival's scheduled departure and arrival times. This had the effect of "sandwiching" British Eagle's flights. BEA's response also included the introduction of trickle loading and subsequent introduction of full onboard catering as well as a separate first class cabin.

On 11 March 1964, a BEA Trident 1C operated the Trident's first commercial service, standing in for a Comet 4B that had been scheduled to fly 79 fare-paying passengers from Heathrow to Copenhagen. BEA's regular commercial Trident operations commenced on 1 April 1964. Initially, BEA operated its Tridents in a 79-seat, two-class configuration, comprising 15 first class and 64 tourist class seats.

In June 1964, BEA acquired a minority shareholding in North East England-based independent regional airline BKS Air Transport.

On 10 June 1965, BEA Trident 1C G-ARPR performed the world's first automatic touchdown at London Heathrow on a commercial flight with fare-paying passengers. Another BEA Trident performed the world's first fully automatic landing in fog by a civil aircraft in zero visibility at Heathrow in November 1966.

On 26 August 1965, BEA signed the contract for a follow-on Trident order. This covered 15 firm Trident 2Es plus 10 options for delivery from spring 1968. The 2E series was an aerodynamically improved version of the original 1C series incorporating the re-arranged interior of the "hot-and-high" 1E series that resulted in a greater seating capacity, as well as a higher gross weight, increased fuel capacity by providing an additional fuel tank in the fin and more powerful Rolls-Royce Spey engines to fly non-stop from London to Beirut with 90 passengers.

In the mid-1960s, BEA's European rivals began placing orders for new "second-generation" jet aircraft, such as the Boeing 727-200 and its smaller stablemate, the 737-200, as well as the Douglas DC-9-30/40. Compared with the Trident, these were more economical, in terms of range, revenue generation and seat-mile costs. Of particular concern to BEA in this context were Air France's plans to replace Caravelles with new 727-200s on most of its London–Paris flights. BEA also had a requirement for a jet to replace Vanguards on the Heathrow–Manchester route to regain traffic lost to British Rail as a result of the electrification of the London–Manchester line and Berlin-based Viscounts to restore the competitive balance with Pan Am's new 727s on the internal German services. Therefore, in February 1966, BEA began evaluating the 727-200, 737-200 and DC-9-40 for these requirements, favouring the former two seating up to 166 and 111 passengers in single-class configuration respectively. In June 1966, BEA requested UK government permission to place an order with Boeing for 18 727-200s and 23 737-200s. Following the UK government's refusal to grant BEA permission to order an all-American fleet of Boeing 727-200s and 737-200s, the Board of Trade (BOT) directed the airline to buy comparable British aircraft instead. This resulted in a BEA order for 18 firm BAC One-Eleven 500s plus six options in January 1967, for delivery from autumn 1968, to meet BEA's requirement to replace Vanguards/Viscounts on its Heathrow–Manchester and internal German routes.

In February 1967, BEA sought UK government approval to order up to 40 (Note: 30 firm orders plus 10 options) BAC Two-Elevens, a 200-seat, six-abreast development of the five-abreast BAC One-Eleven powered by Rolls-Royce RB211 high-bypass turbofan engines, for service entry in the early 1970s. The UK government's refusal to let BEA order American aircraft, as well as its subsequent decision to stop funding the development of BAC's Two-Eleven and a delay to the rival Rolls-Royce RB207-powered, 250-seat pan-European Airbus A300 widebody, also resulted in another Trident order from the airline for 26 firm 3B series aircraft plus 10 options in early 1968, for delivery from 1971.

As this necessitated the purchase of a greater number of aircraft with fewer seats and less range that needed to be inducted into the fleet over a shorter period of time due to later availability compared with the originally chosen American aircraft, BEA had made both its £32 million One-Eleven 500 order and £83 million Trident 3B order dependent on receiving a subsidy from the UK government to compensate it for having been directed against its commercial judgement to order British aircraft with a lower earning potential and later delivery dates. The UK government responded to BEA's plea by agreeing to transfer £25 million from the airline's existing borrowings to a special account on which no interest was payable, including the option to transfer this amount to its profit and loss account as required. This arrangement furthermore permitted a subsequent transfer to BEA of an additional £12.5 million in case this was required.

BEA's first order for the BAC One-Eleven enabled BAC to proceed with the development of the 500 series, a more powerful, stretched version of the original One-Eleven 200 launched by BEA's independent rival British United Airways in 1961; its second repeat-order for Tridents launched the 3B series, a more powerful, aerodynamically enhanced, stretched version of the earlier Trident models already in service with/ordered by the airline. The 3B had an unusual (and noisy) feature, a small fourth engine (a Rolls-Royce RB162) in the base of the tailfin to increase power during takeoff. The One-Eleven 510EDs ordered by BEA had a range of 1,150 mi (1,850 km) and were configured for 97 passengers in a single class while the Trident 3Bs entered service with the airline either in a 152-seat, single-class or a 130-seat, two-class (Note: first and tourist) configuration. BEA's BAC One-Eleven 510EDs and Hawker Siddeley Trident 3Bs also featured common instrumentation to attain a high degree of commonality. This was achieved by having Smiths supply the avionics of both aircraft, which in the case of the One-Eleven replaced the Collins avionics found on all other 500 series.

The differences in flight deck layout between the 510ED and other 500 series were so significant that a separate aircraft type rating was required to fly the former. Another notable difference between the 510ED and all other 500 series was that the former's Rolls-Royce RB163-25 Mk 512-11 Spey engines lacked the latter's Mk 512-14DWs' demineralised water injection system, and that these engines were rated at the same thrust as the Speys powering BEA's Trident 2Es and 3Bs. To compensate for the 510ED's lower rated engines, no forward integral airstairs were fitted. The resulting weight saving permitted an increase in payload. It also offset (to some extent) the additional costs of customisation to attain commonality with the Trident 3B. Although unique in the context of the 500 series, the absence of forward airstairs was a characteristic BEA's 510EDs shared with BUA's 201ACs.

On 4 January 1966, BEA's biggest independent rival, BUA, simultaneously launched daily BAC One-Eleven jet services from Gatwick to Glasgow, Edinburgh and Belfast, which indirectly competed with the corporation's London–Scotland and London – Northern Ireland trunk routes from Heathrow. This allowed BUA to steal a march on BEA by becoming the first scheduled all-jet operator on UK domestic trunk routes.

In November 1966, BEA increased its shareholding in BKS Air Transport to 50%.

In March 1967, BEA established British Air Services as a new holding company for BKS Air Transport and Cambrian Airways, its two loss-making regional airline subsidiaries.

1967 was also the year the Wilson government appointed a committee of inquiry under the chairmanship of Professor Sir Ronald Edwards, at the time the chairman of the Electricity Council and a professor at the London School of Economics, to deliberate the future prospects of Britain's air transport industry. The Edwards Committee published its report entitled British Air Transport in the Seventies on 2 May 1969. Its principal recommendations were

- creation of a British Airways Board to bring both BEA and BOAC under joint management control
- creation of a majority privately owned "Second Force" airline to counterbalance the near-monopoly of the corporations, which provided 90% of all UK scheduled air transport capacity at the time
- permitting the corporations to participate in the inclusive tour (IT) charter market alongside the independents by establishing dedicated, non-IATA subsidiaries
- creation of a Civil Aviation Authority (CAA) to combine the separate regulatory functions of the UK Air Registration Board (ARB), ATLB and BOT in a new statutory body with enhanced powers.

The report's publication led to the formation of BEA Airtours as BEA's wholly owned charter subsidiary later the same year while subsequent adoption of its recommendations by the Heath government resulted in the merger of BEA's independent rivals Caledonian Airways and BUA to form Caledonian//BUA, which assumed the role of the "Second Force" in November 1970. To enable the new "Second Force" to become viable and to redress the competitive imbalance between it and the corporations, the Heath government ordered a limited route transfer from the latter to the former. For BEA this entailed the loss of the Heathrow – Le Bourget route, which was transferred to its newly formed independent rival to accommodate the newcomer's Gatwick – Le Bourget service within the constraints of the Anglo-French bilateral air treaty.

On 15 February 1968, BEA took delivery of its first Trident 2E. This was followed by entry into service on the airline's routes from Heathrow to Milan, Madrid, Dublin and Stockholm on 1 June that year.

On 1 April 1968, BEA's first scheduled service to Paris Orly Airport departed Heathrow; this resulted in splitting its Paris operations between Orly and Le Bourget.

Following its commercial debut on 1 September 1968, on BEA's internal German routes, the airline's new One-Eleven 500s began regular scheduled operations on 17 November 1968, respectively replacing Vanguards and Viscounts on the corporation's Heathrow–Manchester and Berlin routes.

British Airways Cargo Vickers V.953C Merchantman G-APEK still in basic BEA "Speedjack" colours following the BEA-BOAC merger. The aircraft is seen here at London Heathrow, ca. mid-1970s.

By 1969, BEA carried 132,000 tonnes of freight each year. That year, it also opened a new cargo centre at Heathrow, which it jointly operated with BOAC. To cope with increasing amounts of air freight, it began replacing its nine Argosy freighters with the same number of Vickers V.953C Merchantmans, which were converted V.953 Vanguard passenger planes. Aviation Traders Engineering Limited (ATEL) of Southend converted the first two of these while BEA's inhouse engineering department converted the remainder using kits supplied by ATEL.

In its 1969–70 financial year, BEA's revenue from ticket sales was £126 million resulting in a profit of £6.5 million, almost twice the previous year's and the biggest in the airline's history until that time.

In its 1970–71 financial year, BEA carried 8.67 million passengers at an average load factor of just over 54%. During that period it employed just under 25,000 people, revenues totalled £133 million and the operating loss stood at £780,000.

On 18 February 1971, BEA received its first Trident 3B. Commercial operations began on 1 March of that year on the airline's Heathrow–Orly route.

On 31 October 1971, BEA operated its last scheduled service from Heathrow to Le Bourget, marking the end of 25 years' continuous operations by the airline at the historic Paris airport. This move was necessitated by the Anglo-French bilateral air treaty to make room for British Caledonian's Gatwick – Le Bourget service, (Note: Caledonian//BUA became British Caledonian (BCal) in September 1971) which began the following day. This in turn resulted in all of BEA's Heathrow–Paris flights exclusively using Orly from then on.

In early-December 1971, BEA bought both of Channel Airways' Trident 1Es for use by the airline's Channel Islands Airways division and Northeast Airlines (Note: BKS Air Transport became Northeast Airlines in June 1970) on mainline routes from Birmingham and regional routes from Newcastle and Leeds/Bradford respectively. Together with the ongoing Trident 3B deliveries, this additional Trident purchase would bring the total number of Tridents in BEA's fleet (Note: 1964 to 1974) to 67, (Note: 24 1Cs, 2 1Es, 15 2Es, 26 3Bs) making the type its most numerous jetliner.

1971 was also the year BEA underwent a major reorganisation under its then chairman Henry Marking entailing the establishment of 10 divisions that were meant to act as profit centres. These were

- BEA Mainline
- BEA Cargo
- Super One-Eleven
- Scottish Airways
- Channel Islands Airways
- BEA Helicopters
- BEA Airtours
- British Air Services
- Travel Sales
- Sovereign Group Hotels.

BEA Mainline assumed responsibility for all of BEA's Heathrow operations other than those to and from Manchester, Leeds/Bradford, Liverpool, Newcastle, Aberdeen, Inverness, the Isle of Man, Berlin (including both non-stop and one-stop services) and certain regional European destinations such as Bordeaux, Cork, Luxembourg and Rimini, as well as its Birmingham operations other than those to and from the Channel Islands.

BEA Cargo assumed responsibility for all of BEA's freight activities, including all pure freighter aircraft.

The Super One-Eleven division was headquartered in Manchester. It assumed responsibility for BEA's entire BAC One-Eleven 500 fleet and all of the airline's Manchester operations other than those to and from the Channel Islands, as well as all of its Berlin operations, with at least six aircraft based at Ringway and up to 12 at Tempelhof. From 1 April 1973, it also began replacing Viscounts and Tridents plying the Aberdeen–Heathrow route on behalf of BEA's Scottish Airways division with One-Eleven 500s, as the latter were more efficient and had greater passenger appeal.

The Scottish Airways division was headquartered in Glasgow and assumed responsibility for all of BEA's Scottish internal routes, as well as all of the airline's Glasgow–Belfast, Aberdeen–Heathrow and Inverness–Heathrow services. In addition to its Viscount mainline aircraft, Scottish Airways also operated a dedicated fleet of smaller regional feeder aircraft. These served remote communities in Scotland's Highlands and Islands region.

The Channel Islands Airways division assumed responsibility for all of BEA's services to and from the Channel Islands other than those to and from Heathrow, Bristol, Cardiff, Leeds/Bradford, Liverpool and Newcastle. It also operated domestic and international routes from Birmingham, using a dedicated Trident 1E, as well as a mix of Scottish and Channel Islands Viscounts.

BEA's wholly owned helicopter subsidiary assumed responsibility for its entire rotorcraft fleet and all of the airline's rotorcraft operations, including the scheduled service between Penzance and the Isles of Scilly.

BEA's wholly owned charter subsidiary BEA Airtours assumed responsibility for all of its regular, non-IATA flying activities using fixed-wing aircraft – i.e., predominantly IT charter flights under contract to third-party tour operators.

The British Air Services division assumed responsibility for Cambrian Airways and Northeast Airlines, BEA's two majority-owned regional airline subsidiaries. This included all services operated by these airlines on behalf of their parent company, principally all of the corporation's domestic and international services from and to Bristol, Cardiff, Leeds/Bradford, Liverpool, Newcastle and the Isle of Man, as well as selected international regional services from Heathrow such as Bordeaux, Cork, Luxembourg and Rimini.

Travel Sales assumed responsibility for all of BEA's sales-related activities.

Sovereign Group Hotels assumed responsibility for the management of all Sovereign hotels, BEA's associated hotel chain.

=== BEA–BOAC merger (1972–1974) ===
==== British Airways Board (1972) ====
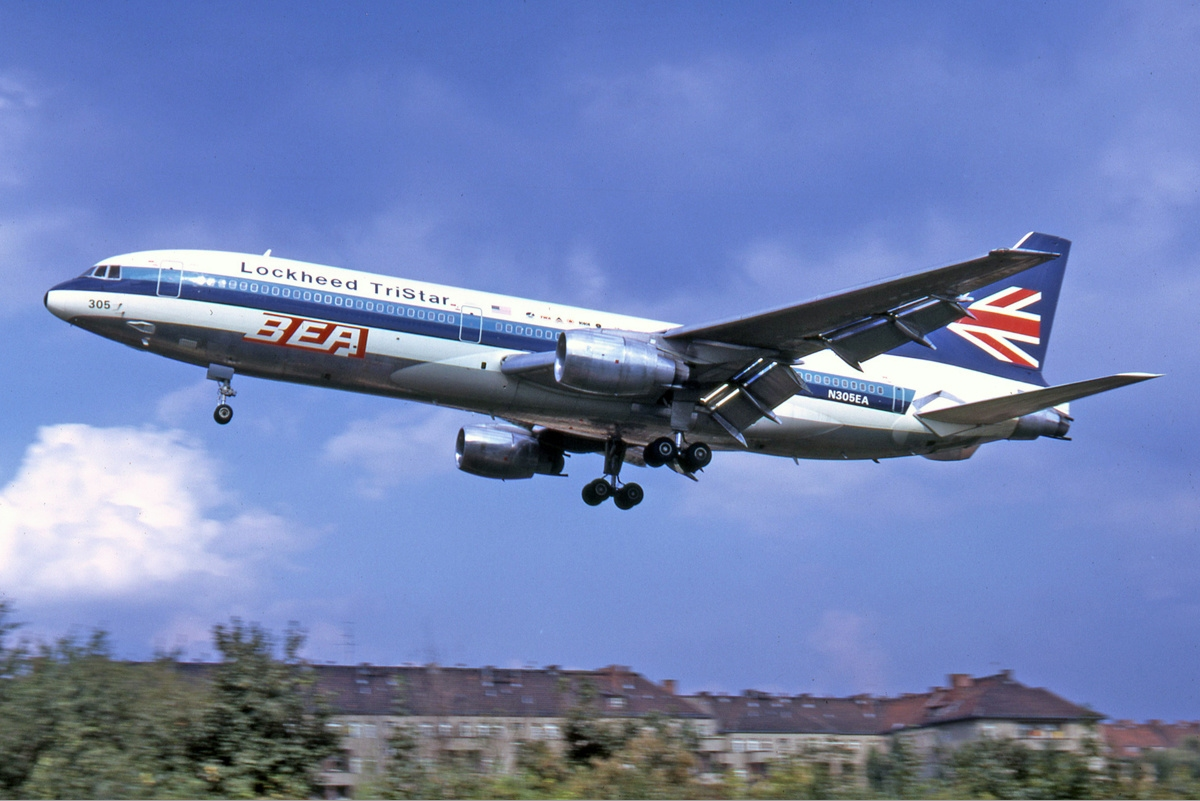
Lockheed's L-1011 Tristar demonstrator on a world tour in Eastern Air Lines paint scheme overlaid with BEA "Speedjack" decals, 1972.

The first attempt at a merger of BEA and BOAC arose in 1953 out of inconclusive attempts between the two airlines to negotiate air rights through the British colony of Cyprus. The chairman of BOAC, Miles Thomas, was in favour of the idea as a potential solution to a disagreement between the two airlines as to which should serve the increasingly important oil regions of the Middle East, and he had backing for his proposal from the Chancellor of the Exchequer at the time, Rab Butler. However, opposition from the Treasury blocked the idea, and an agreement was reached instead to allow BEA to serve Ankara in Turkey, and in return to leave all routes east and south of Cyprus to BOAC. Paradoxically, through its effective control of Cyprus Airways, BEA was able to continue to serve destinations ceded to BOAC, including Beirut and Cairo by using Cyprus Airways as its proxy.

However, it was only following the recommendations of the 1969 Edwards Report, that a new British Airways Board, combining BEA and BOAC, was constituted on 1 April 1972. This event coincided with the establishment of the CAA, the UK's new, unified regulator for the air transport industry.

One of the newly formed British Airways Board's first major decisions was to place a £60 million order for six Rolls-Royce RB211-powered Lockheed L-1011 TriStar series 1 widebodies on BEA's behalf, with an option on six more for either BEA or BOAC. BEA was to take delivery of its first widebodied aircraft during the fourth quarter of 1974.

On 1 September 1972, BEA became the British European Airways Division of the newly formed British Airways Group.

In its 1973–74 financial year, BEA's last, the airline carried 8.74 million passengers and – excluding losses on its Scottish and Channel Islands operations – recorded its highest-ever profit of £6.7 million.

==== British Airways (1974) ====
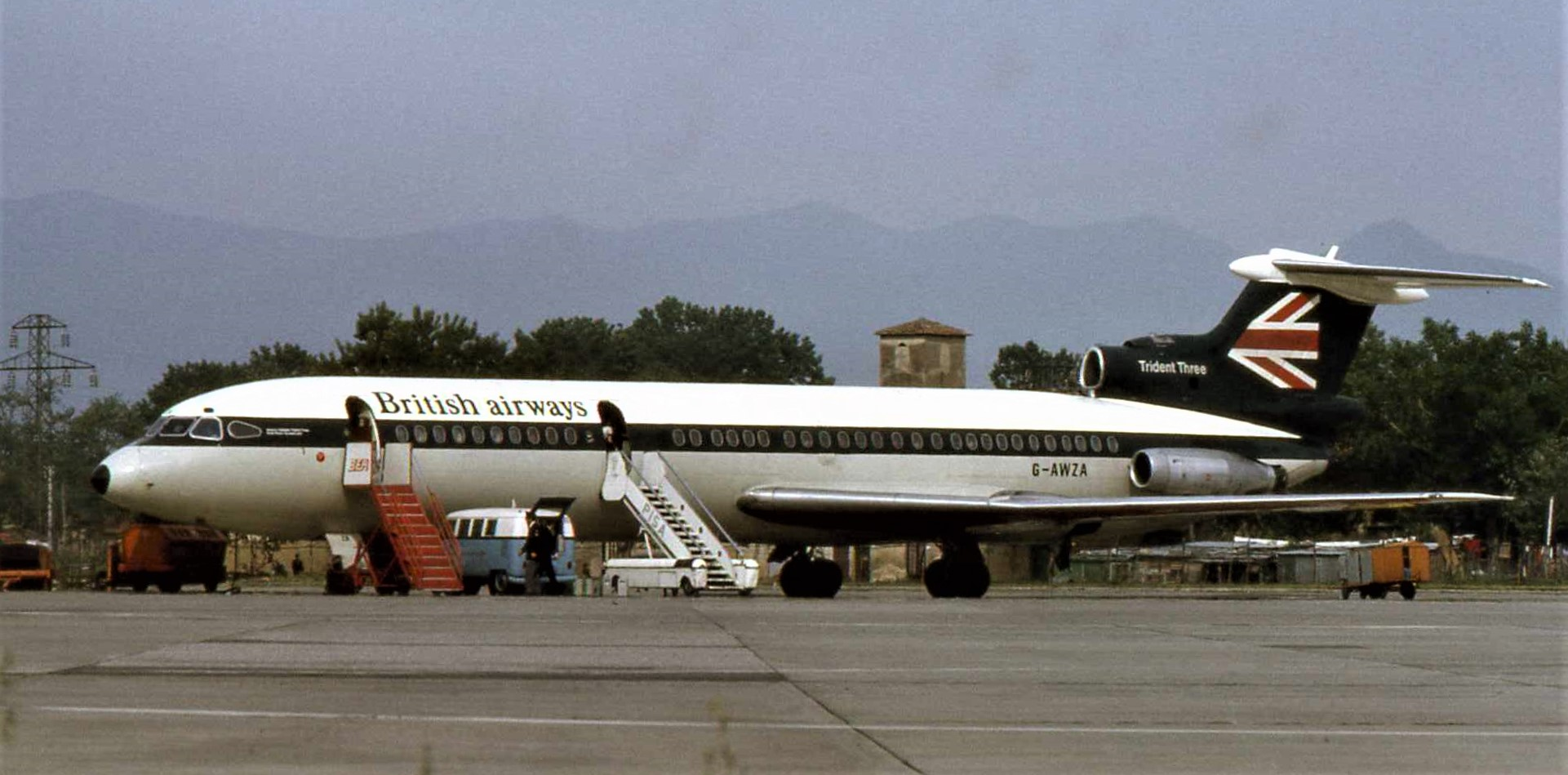
British Airways Trident 3B G-AWZA still in basic BEA "Speedjack" colours following the BEA-BOAC merger. The aircraft is seen here at Pisa Airport in 1975.

BEA ceased operations on 1 April 1974, when it merged with BOAC to form British Airways. A BEA Trident operated the airline's final flight from Dublin to Heathrow on 31 March 1974. Following the late-night arrival at Heathrow at 23:30 hrs of flight BE 943 ("Bealine 943"), BEA passed into history as of 00:00 hrs the following day. (Note: section 57 of the Civil Aviation Act 1971 was the legal basis for the dissolution of BEA and BOAC on 31 March 1974, while the Air Corporations (Dissolution) Order 1973 transferred BEA's and BOAC's property rights and liabilities to the British Airways Board on 1 April 1974) However, even after the merger, a British Airways European Division, which incorporated the former BEA Mainline operation, the erstwhile Super One-Eleven and Cargo divisions, as well as British Airtours, (Note: BEA Airtours became British Airtours on 1 April 1974) continued to exist alongside a British Airways Overseas, a British Airways Regional and four other divisions until 1 April 1977, when these were replaced by a unified operating structure organised into a number of departments, including commercial operations, flight operations, engineering, planning, catering and personnel. These organisational changes were accompanied by the adoption of a single, two-letter, IATA airline identification code for the entire airline, i.e., BA, the old BOAC/Overseas Division code. Until then, each of the three main airline divisions had its own two-letter, IATA airline identification code, BA for Overseas, BE for European and BZ for Regional.

=== Highlands and islands operations ===
==== Scotland ====
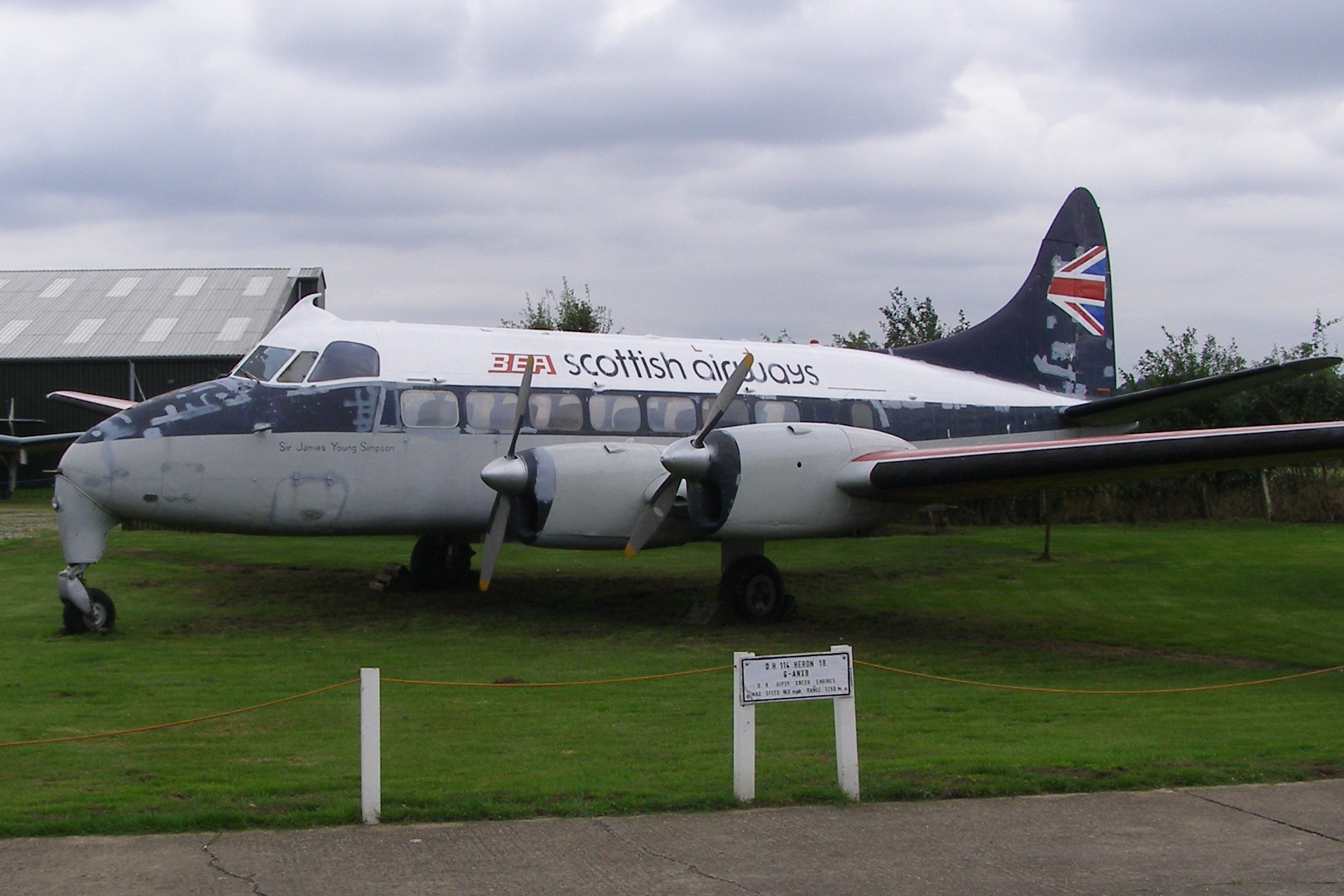
Weathered-looking de Havilland Heron 1B G-ANXB in the "Speedjack" livery of BEA Scottish Airways on static display at Newark Air Museum, England.

The Dragon Rapides BEA had inherited from Scottish Airways and other former independent airlines it had taken over in early-1947 initially operated the corporation's Scottish routes, including services to remote communities in the Highlands and Islands.

From 1948, BEA Dragon Rapides were contracted to operate the Scottish Air Ambulance Service.

In 1952, BEA began replacing Dragon Rapides with Pionairs across its Scottish network; however, the pre-war de Havilland biplanes continued serving Barra as no other contemporary type in BEA's fleet could take off from and land on the island's beach airstrip. The Scottish Air Ambulance Service continued to contract BEA Dragon Rapides as well.

Following successful trials of de Havilland's Heron Series 1 demonstrator G-ALZL on BEA's Channel Islands routes during the second half of 1951, the airline placed an order for two 1B series aircraft to replace "Islander" class Rapides on its Glasgow–Barra route as it was well-suited to serving restricted airfields in difficult weather conditions. Both aircraft were delivered in February 1955, wearing BEA's contemporary bare metal finish livery incorporating a burgundy cheatline separated by two thin, white lines above the cabin windows. In BEA service the Herons were known as "Hebridean" class aircraft seating 14 passengers on regular commercial flights. The Heron operated its first air ambulance service on 4 March 1955, while BEA crews were still undergoing conversion training on the new type. This was followed by a naming ceremony for both aircraft held at Glasgow's Renfrew Airport on 18 March 1955, when each aircraft was named after a Scottish medical pioneer (G-ANXA, the second aircraft to be delivered on 23 February 1955, was named John Hunter while G-ANXB, the first aircraft to be delivered on 12 February 1955, was named Sir James Young Simpson). Scheduled operations commenced on 18 April 1955, following which one aircraft was exclusively used on scheduled services while the other was kept on stand-by for air ambulance duties. An expansion of BEA's scheduled activities within the Scottish mainland as well as between the mainland and the Outer Hebrides, Orkneys and Shetlands necessitated the acquisition of a third aircraft to provide adequate cover for the air ambulance service. This resulted in an order for a third Heron 1B, which was delivered on 13 April 1956. This aircraft (G-AOFY, Sir Charles Bell) crashed on 28 September 1957, while on an air ambulance service to Port Ellen/Glenegedale Airport, Islay, Inner Hebrides, with the loss of the pilot, radio officer and duty nurse on board.

From 1962, BEA supplemented the Herons it used on its Scottish internal services with three new, 48-seater Handley Page Dart Herald 100 series turboprops. These had originally been ordered in 1959 through the Ministry of Supply, which leased them to the airline. BEA operated its first commercial Herald service on 16 April 1962, on the Northern Isles route from Glasgow to Sumburgh via Wick, Aberdeen and Kirkwall. However, BEA operated its Heralds, which wore the red, black and white livery, only for a few years because of high crew training, maintenance and spares costs.

1962 was also the year BEA introduced Viscounts on its Scottish network. These took over the routes to Benbecula and Stornoway in the Outer Hebrides from 21 May, only two days after BEA's last-ever Pionair service from Islay via Campbeltown to Renfrew.

From October 1966, BEA operated only Viscounts and Herons on its Scottish network. It used the former on the busier, longer routes while it utilised the latter on short feeder routes to/from restricted airfields serving remote communities as well as on the air ambulance service.

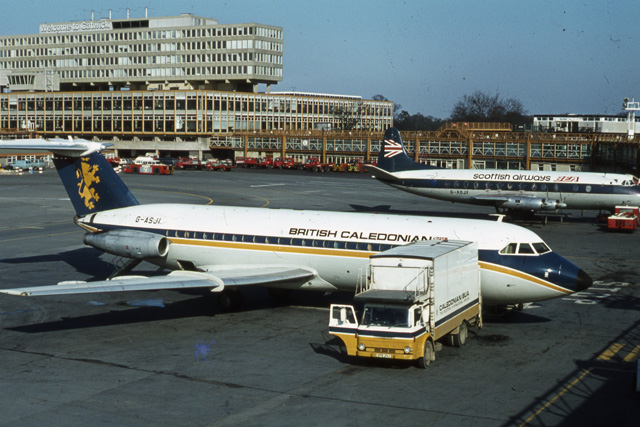
Vickers Viscount in the "Speedjack" livery of BEA Scottish Airways (background). The aircraft is seen at London Gatwick sharing the ramp with a British Caledonian BAC One-Eleven (foreground), 1972

To improve the financial prospects of its loss-making Scottish lifeline routes, BEA established Scottish Airways Division in 1971. Glasgow-headquartered Scottish Airways became financially accountable for BEA's Scottish internal routes. It also assumed financial responsibility for the airline's services from Glasgow to Belfast, as well as from Aberdeen and Inverness to Heathrow. While it was initially operationally responsible for its entire network as well as the Scottish Air Ambulance Service, operational responsibility for the Aberdeen–Heathrow route passed to BEA's Super One-Eleven division on 1 April 1973, when the latter's One-Eleven 500s began replacing Scottish Airways Viscounts and mainline division Tridents.

In November 1972, BEA ordered two Short Skyliner turboprops, a 19-seat deluxe all-passenger version of the Short Skyvan utility aircraft, to replace the ageing Herons. Following BEA's last scheduled Heron service from Barra via Tiree to Glasgow in March 1973 and successful route trials of the new Skyliners, which wore a modified BEA "Speedjack" livery incorporating dual BEA/British airways titles, the latter debuted on BEA's Scottish internal services from Glasgow to Barra and Campbeltown. BEA's Skyliners were intended to replace the airline's Herons as air ambulances as well; however, when Glasgow-based independent air taxi, charter and regional scheduled operator Loganair assumed responsibility for the Scottish Air Ambulance Service on 1 April 1973, the Skyliners had yet to enter service. This turn of events therefore marked the end of BEA's air ambulance services in Scotland after 25 years' continuous operation.

On 31 March 1974, the British Airways Board placed an order for two British Aerospace 748 Series 2B turboprops for delivery to British Airways in 1975. These were intended to replace ageing Viscounts on the Scottish routes the new airline would inherit from BEA the following day, as well as for use on North Sea oil exploration flights.

==== Channel Islands ====
BEA acquired a presence in the Channel Islands as a result of the takeover of Channel Islands Airways on 1 April 1947. Channel Islands Airways was the holding company and successor of pre-war independent scheduled airlines Jersey Airways and Guernsey Airways. It was also among the independents that were absorbed into BEA following their nationalisation which began earlier that year.

BEA commenced its services in the Channel Islands in 1947, using Dragon Rapides inherited from its independent predecessors.

Following the transfer of BEA's London–Jersey route from Croydon to Northolt on 21 April 1947, DC-3s began replacing Rapides on most services. By 2 November 1947, all of the corporation's London–Guernsey flights had moved from Croydon to Northolt as well.

In 1949, BEA expanded its fledgling Channel Islands operations by inaugurating London–Alderney and inter-island scheduled services linking Jersey, Guernsey and Alderney.

On 28 April 1950, BEA launched a summer service from Gatwick to Alderney, the airline's first scheduled route from Gatwick as well as its first scheduled service from there to the Channel Islands. Additional scheduled services from Birmingham and Manchester to the islands began the following month.

In 1951, BEA launched a Glasgow–Jersey summer service with DC-3s, the airline's first direct service between Scotland and the Channel Islands. During that year's second half, it also successfully trialled de Havilland's Heron 1 demonstrator on its Channel Islands network.

In April 1952, a new Exeter–Jersey route launched, which BEA contracted to its new independent associate Jersey Airlines. Two months later, a new paved runway opened at Jersey, which enabled the introduction of bigger, heavier aircraft types on BEA's (and other airlines') services to and from the island.

In Summer 1953, BEA introduced "Elizabethan" class Ambassador aircraft on its London–Jersey route.

Following the departure of BEA's last flight from Northolt to Jersey in October 1954, the airline's London – Channel Islands flights served the British capital exclusively via Heathrow.

In 1955, BEA ordered two de Havilland Heron 2 series aircraft for use on its Channel Island feeder routes. These differed from the pair of 1B series Herons used on the airline's Scottish feeder network and air ambulance services in terms of their undercarriage; the series 2 had a retractable undercarriage while the series 1's was fixed. Following BEA's acquisition of a 25% minority stake in its regional associate Jersey Airlines and a subsequent transfer of routes from the corporation to the independent in 1956, the Heron 2s ordered by the former were delivered to the latter.

BEA's withdrawal from Alderney, as well as from Southampton–Guernsey, Jersey–Dinard and Guernsey–Dinard, on 20 April 1956, coincided with the airline's last Rapide service in the Channel Islands. 1956 was also the year that saw Viscounts supplementing DC-3s/Pionairs on the corporation's Heathrow–Jersey route as well as a new summer service from Belfast to Jersey.

BEA's acquisition of minority stakes in its independent associates Jersey Airlines and Cambrian Airways in 1956 and 1958 respectively resulted in the former's withdrawal from a number of mainly secondary routes serving the Channel islands, which were transferred to the latter.

The launch of a new BEA summer weekend service from Aberdeen via Edinburgh to Jersey in 1957 was followed by the transfer of most of the corporation's London–Jersey and London–Guernsey flights from Heathrow to Gatwick when the latter reopened as London's second airport on 9 June 1958, in line with contemporary UK government policy to develop the airport.

On 1 August 1960, a new paved runway opened at Guernsey, which enabled the introduction of bigger, heavier aircraft types on BEA's (and other airlines') services to and from the island.

The withdrawal of Pionairs from BEA's Channel Islands services on 20 March 1961, resulted in the transfer of operations from Southampton to Bournemouth to enable the introduction of Viscounts, which were too heavy for the former's grass runways. On 21 March 1961, BEA launched year-round Viscount services from Bournemouth to Jersey and Guernsey. 1961 also saw BEA's first dedicated pure freight services from both London and Southampton to Jersey. These were operated with "Leopard" class DC-3 freighters. The same year, BEA furthermore terminated its association agreement with Jersey Airlines as both airlines had become competitors on the prime London–Jersey and London–Guernsey trunk routes (Note: using Heathrow and Gatwick as BEA's and Jersey Airlines' respective London terminals) as a result of the Civil Aviation (Licensing) Act that had been enacted the year before. This had abolished the corporations' statutory monopoly on principal domestic and international scheduled routes.

On 31 March 1962, BEA disposed of its minority holding in Jersey Airlines. The following month, Argosies replaced Leopards on BEA's London–Jersey freight run.

In April 1963, most of the corporation's London – Channel Island flights transferred back to Heathrow as a result of the new competitive relationship between BEA and its former associate Jersey Airlines. The following month, BEA launched a London–Guernsey Argosy freighter service.

On 1 June 1964, Vanguards made their debut on BEA's Heathrow–Jersey route. BEA subsequently introduced the type on selected services from Heathrow as well as Manchester.

Between November 1965 and February 1966, BEA Helicopters temporarily operated S-61Ns on behalf of its parent company on the Jersey–Guernsey inter-island service while Jersey's runway was being resurfaced during daytime.

On 1 April 1966, BEA resumed Southampton–Jersey services following the replacement of Southampton's grass runways with a paved runway suitable for bigger, heavier aircraft types such as the Viscount and Vanguard.

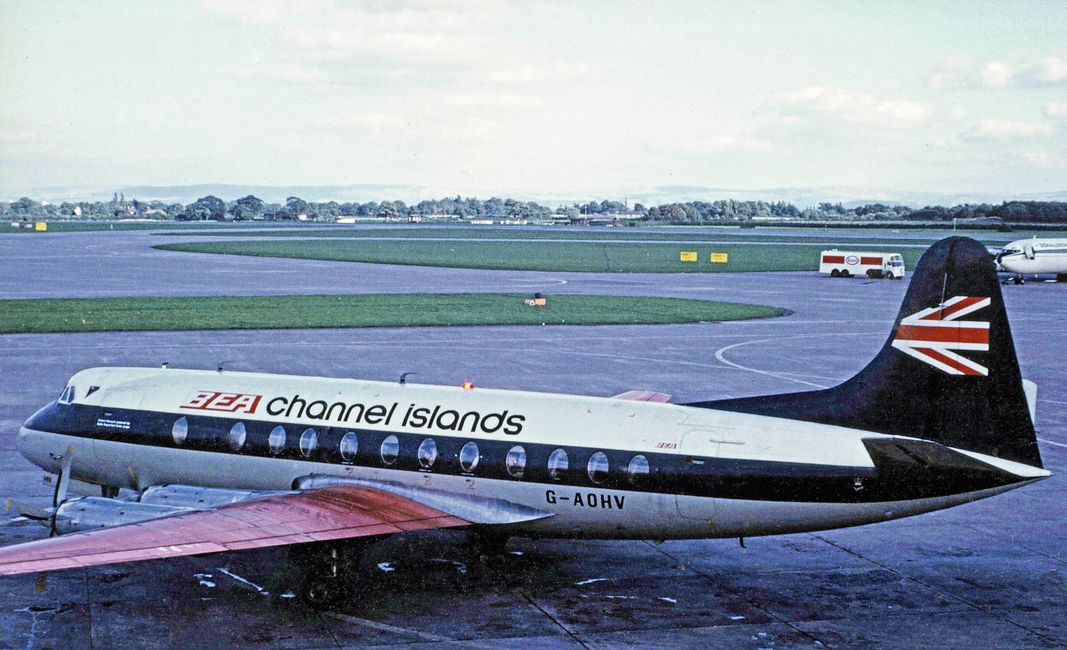
BEA Channel Islands Vickers Viscount 802 at Manchester Airport in 1971 on a schedule from Jersey

Following a successful proving flight on 18 July 1967, BEA introduced Vanguards on selected flights serving Guernsey.

On 31 March 1969, BEA withdrew its Jersey–Guernsey inter-island service, which was taken over by Alderney-based independent air taxi, charter and regional scheduled operator Aurigny Air Services.

To improve the financial prospects of its loss-making Channel Islands operations, BEA established Channel Islands Airways Division in 1971. BEA's Channel Islands Airways division assumed financial and operational responsibility for all of its routes serving the Channel Islands except those serving the islands from Heathrow, Bristol, Cardiff, Leeds/Bradford, Liverpool and Newcastle.

==== Isle of Man ====
BEA acquired a presence in the Isle of Man as a result of the takeover of Isle of Man Air Services in 1947. Operations in the island commenced the same year with Dragon Rapides inherited from its independent predecessors.

In July 1954, BEA operated a proving flight from the mainland to the island using a Vickers Viscount turboprop. In summer 1955, BEA began supplementing DC-3s with Viscounts on its Manchester – Isle of Man route.

On 31 October 1960, BEA operated its last Pionair services to the Isle of Man.

On 1 April 1963, Cambrian Airways took over BEA's remaining routes to and from the Isle of Man (Note: Belfast – Isle of Man, Heathrow – Isle of Man, Liverpool – Isle of Man, Manchester – Isle of Man) as well as all of the corporation's services between Liverpool and Belfast. (Note: direct flights and flights stopping in the Isle of Man) This route transfer also resulted in Cambrian's acquisition of six ex-BEA Viscount 701s, its first turboprop aircraft, to serve the Welsh regional carrier's enlarged network.

==== Isles of Scilly ====
Following the inauguration of scheduled services between Land's End in Cornwall and St Mary's in the Isles of Scilly in 1947, BEA continued serving this route with Dragon Rapides due to a lack of a suitable fixed-wing alternative until BEA Helicopters took it over on 2 May 1964. On that day, BEA's remaining three Rapides were replaced with its helicopter subsidiary's new Sikorsky S-61N rotorcraft on the Scillies route.

=== Overseas-based operations ===
==== BEA in Berlin ====
From 1946 until 1974, BEA operated a comprehensive network of high-frequency, short-haul scheduled services between West Germany and West Berlin. This had come about as a result of an agreement between the United States, the United Kingdom, France and the Soviet Union at the end of World War II, which prohibited Germany from having its own airlines and restricted the provision of commercial air services to and from Berlin to air transport providers headquartered in these four countries. Rising Cold War tensions between the Soviet Union and the three Western powers resulted in unilateral Soviet withdrawal from attendance at the Four Power Allied Control Council in 1948, culminating in the division of Germany the following year. Soviet insistence on a very narrow interpretation of the post-war agreement on the Western powers' access rights to Berlin meant that until the end of the Cold War air transport in West Berlin continued to be confined to the carriers of the Allied Control Commission powers. Aircraft had to fly across hostile East German territory through three 20 mi (32 km) wide air corridors at a maximum altitude of 10,000 ft (3,000 m). (Note: the cruising altitude of propliners employed on the Berlin Airlift)

BEA's first-ever internal German flight took to the air in September 1946 when one of its DC-3s departed Hamburg Fuhlsbüttel for RAF Gatow in Berlin.

During the 1948–49 Berlin Airlift, BEA co-ordinated the operations of the 25 British airlines that participated in the Airlift's Operation Plainfare.

On 8 July 1951, BEA transferred its operations from Gatow to Tempelhof, thereby concentrating all West Berlin air services at Berlin's city centre airport.

BEA's move to Tempelhof resulted in a significant increase in passenger numbers due to the removal of Allied restrictions on the carriage of local civilians on commercial airline services from/to West Berlin and Tempelhof's central location. This enabled the airline to expand its Berlin-based fleet to six Douglas DC-3s.

During the early-to-mid-1950s, BEA leased in aircraft that were bigger than its Tempelhof-based fleet of DC-3/Pionair, Viking and Elizabethan piston-engined airliners from other operators to boost capacity, following a steady increase in the airline's passenger loads. (BEA continued to augment its Berlin fleet with additional aircraft leased from other airlines on an ad hoc basis. This included an ex-Transair Vickers Viscount 700 belonging to its newly formed independent rival British United Airways, which was damaged beyond repair on 30 October 1961, in a non-fatal landing accident at Frankfurt Rhein-Main Airport at the end of a passenger flight that had originated at Tempelhof.)

In 1958, BEA began replacing its ageing piston airliners with Vickers Viscount 701 turboprop aircraft in a high-density, 63-seat single class seating arrangement. Up to 10 new Vickers Viscount 802s, which featured a more spacious, 66-seat single-class seating arrangement, soon replaced the older series 701 aircraft. The greater range and higher cruising speed of the 802 series enabled BEA to inaugurate a non-stop London Heathrow – Berlin Tempelhof service on 1 November 1965.

By 1964, BEA operated up to 20,000 flights each year from and to Berlin. These represented approximately half of the airline's total yearly flights to/from Germany and generated profits of £1 million per year.

22 January 1966, marked the first appearance of a British trijet at Tempelhof when Hawker Siddeley flew in its HS 121 Trident 1E (Note: an improved version of the original Trident 1C BEA already operated, which lacked a short-field capability that would have made it suitable for the airline's Tempelhof operation) demonstrator aircraft for evaluation by BEA. A week later, on 29 January, BEA began evaluating the BAC One-Eleven's suitability for its Berlin operations, with the start of a series of test flights conducted on its behalf by BAC's 475 series demonstrator. This included a number of takeoffs and landings at Tempelhof to test the aircraft's short-field performance.

On 18 March 1966, BEA's main competitor on the internal German services (IGS) routes, Pan American World Airways (Pan Am), became the first airline to commence regular, year-round jet operations from Tempelhof with new 128-seat, single-class Boeing 727 100 series, one of the first jet aircraft with a short-field capability.

Pan Am's move put BEA at a considerable competitive disadvantage, especially on the busy Berlin–Frankfurt route where the former out-competed the latter with both modern jet planes as well as a higher flight frequency. BEA responded to Pan Am by increasing the Berlin-based fleet to 13 Viscounts by winter 1966/7 to offer higher frequencies. This also entailed re-configuring aircraft cabins in a lower-density seating arrangement, as a result of which the refurbished cabins featured only 53 Comet-type first-class seats in a four-abreast layout instead of 66 five-abreast economy seats. In addition, BEA sought to differentiate itself from its main competitor by providing a superior in-flight catering standard. (BEA's Silver Star service included complimentary hot meals on all flights whereas Pan Am only offered free on-board snacks. Sections of the local press dubbed the contrasting strategies of the two main protagonists plying the internal German routes from Berlin – estimated to be worth £15–20 million in annual revenues – the Dinner oder Düsen? ("Dinner or Jet?") battle.) Henceforth, the airline marketed these services as Super Silver Star.

The introduction of Pan Am's 727s to the Berlin market represented a major step change because of the aircraft's ability to carry more passengers than any other contemporary aircraft type used by scheduled carriers in the short-haul Berlin market, and its ability to take off from and land on Tempelhof's short runways with a full commercial payload as only light fuel loads were required on the short internal German services. Compared with BEA, Pan Am's 727s carried 20% more passengers than the British carrier's Comet 4Bs (Note: from August 1968) and up to 2½ times as many passengers as the latter's Viscounts. (Note: Silver Star configuration)

Within two years of Pan Am's introduction of jet equipment on the bulk of its internal German services from/to West Berlin, its market share rose from 58% to 68% while BEA's declined from 38% at the beginning of this period to 27% at its end. The lower seat density in BEA's re-configured Viscounts combined with higher flight frequencies, superior catering and increased promotion proved insufficient to counter the appeal of Pan Am's new jets, despite these being laid out in a comparatively tight, 34 in (86 cm) pitch seating configuration. On the other hand, BEA's reduced capacity in the domestic air travel market between West Berlin and West Germany enabled it to attain higher load factors than its competitors.

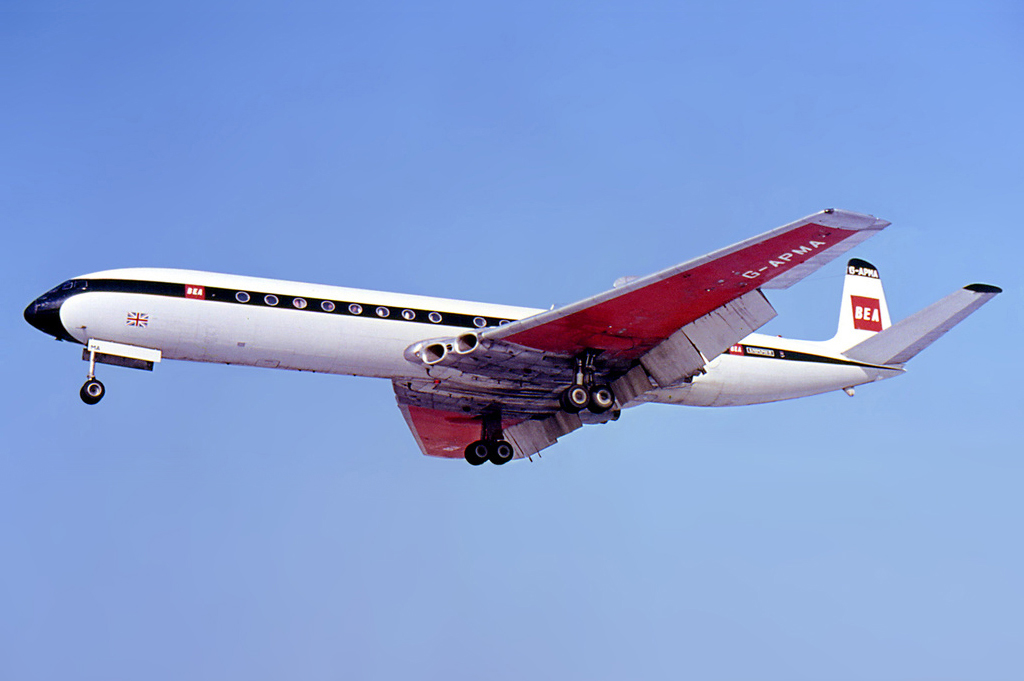
A BEA Comet 4B in the red, black and white livery, 1969

From August 1968, BEA supplemented its Tempelhof-based Viscount fleet with de Havilland Comet 4B series jetliners. Although these aircraft could operate from Tempelhof's short runways without payload restrictions, they were not suited to the airline's ultra short-haul operation from Berlin (average stage length: 230 mi (370 km)) given the high fuel consumption of the Comet, especially when operating at the mandatory 10,000 ft (3,000 m) altitude inside the Allied air corridors. This measure was therefore only a stopgap until most of BEA's Berlin fleet was equipped with 97-seat, single-class BAC One-Eleven 500s. (Note: the temporary use of Comet 4Bs on BEA's Berlin routes enabled Viscount crews to undergo conversion training on the One-Eleven) BEA's re-equipment of its Berlin fleet with new One-Eleven 500 jets was central to the airline's competitive strategy to regain ground lost to Pan Am's 727s. The new One-Eleven 500, which BEA called the Super One-Eleven, operated its first scheduled service from Berlin on 1 September 1968. It began replacing the airline's Berlin-based Viscounts from 17 November 1968.

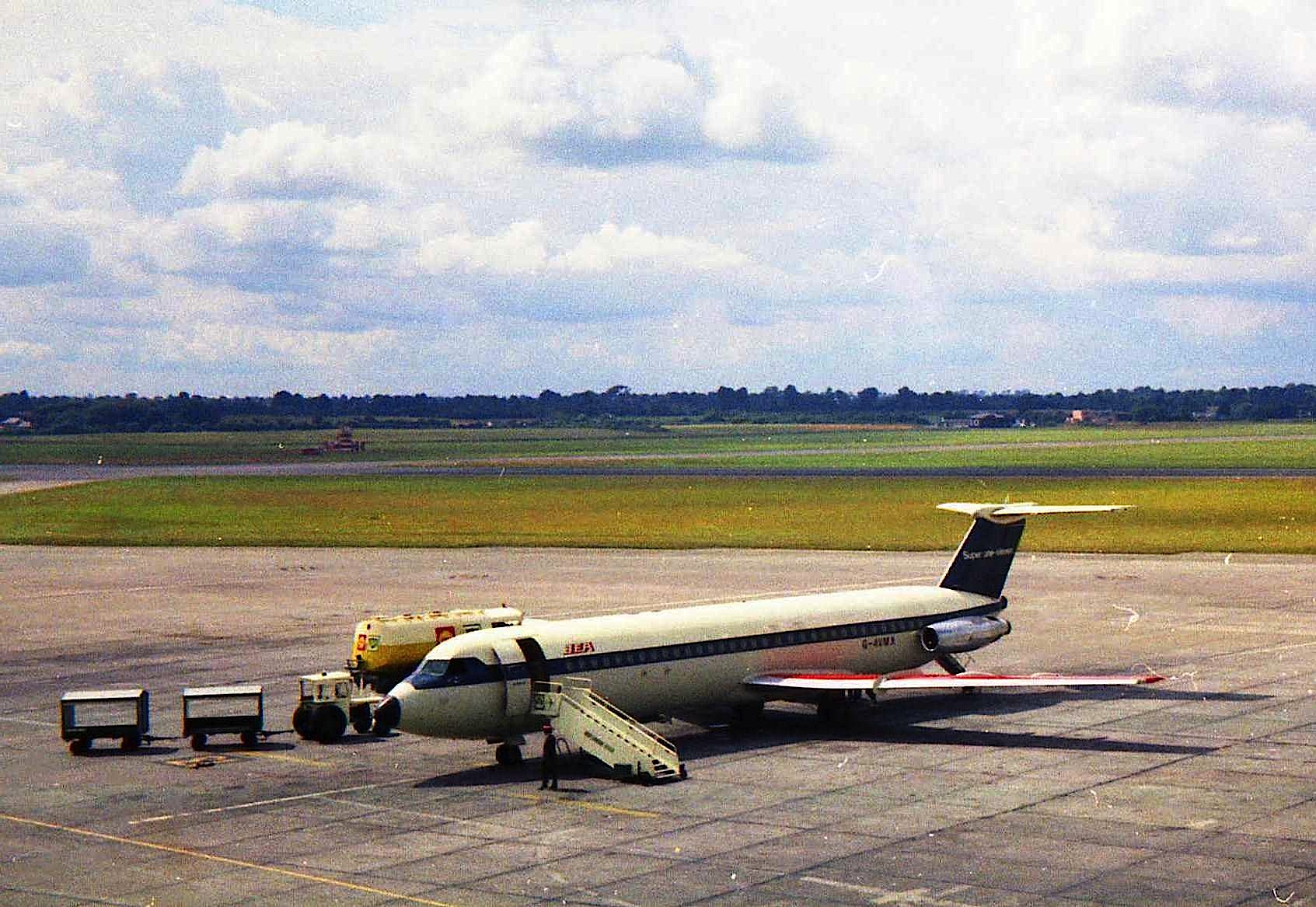
BAC One-Eleven 510ED G-AVMX in the modified BEA-Air France livery featuring a neutral, dark-blue fin instead of the "Speedjack" tail motif, 1971.

Air France, West Berlin's third scheduled carrier, which had suffered a continuous traffic decline ever since the transfer of Berlin operations to more distant Tegel at the beginning of 1960 due to Tempelhof's operational limitations that made it unsuitable for its Caravelles, was worst affected by the equipment changes at the latter airport during the mid- to late-1960s. To reverse growing losses on its Berlin routes resulting from load factors as low as 30%, Air France decided to withdraw from the internal German market entirely and instead enter into a joint venture with BEA. This arrangement entailed the latter taking over the former's two remaining German domestic routes to Frankfurt and Munich and operating these with its own aircraft and flightdeck crews from Tempelhof. It also entailed repainting the fins of the BEA One-Eleven 500s in a neutral, dark-blue scheme featuring Super One-Eleven titles instead of BEA's "Speedjack" motif. The Air France-BEA joint venture became operational in spring 1969 and terminated in autumn 1972.

By 1971, BEA carried 2 million passengers each year on its Berlin routes. 1971 was also the year the airline's last Berlin-based Viscount departed the city.

East Germany's relaxation of border controls affecting all surface transport modes between West Berlin and West Germany across its territory from 1972 onwards resulted in a decline of scheduled internal German air traffic from/to West Berlin. This was further compounded by the economic downturn in the wake of the 1973 oil crisis. The resulting fare increases that were intended to recover higher operating costs caused by steeply rising jet fuel prices led to a further drop in demand. This in turn resulted in a major contraction of BEA's – and subsequently British Airways' – (as well as Pan Am's) internal German operations, necessitating a reduction in the Berlin-based fleet (Note: from nine to seven BAC One-Eleven 500s (following on from an earlier reduction from 12 to nine in response to the termination of the BEA-Air France joint venture)) and workforce in an attempt to contain growing losses these once profitable routes generated by the mid-1970s.

=== Subsidiaries ===
==== BEA Helicopters ====
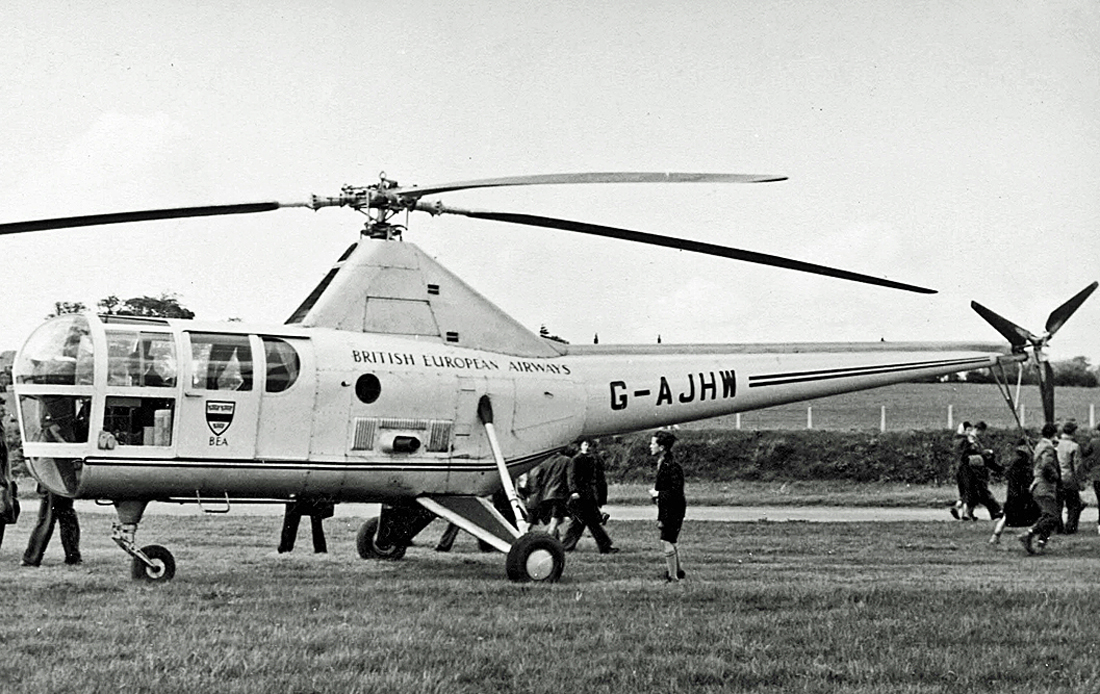
British European Airways Sikorsky S-51 Dragonfly G-AJHW, 1953

The airline carried out trials with its Helicopter Experiment Unit, operating mail services in East Anglia during 1948 and a passenger service from Cardiff via Wrexham to Liverpool (Speke) Airport in 1950. In 1952, BEA established a base at Gatwick on the site of the airport's old Beehive terminal. On 1 January 1964, BEA formed BEA Helicopters as a separate helicopter subsidiary, which established its administrative headquarters and engineering base at Gatwick. Following retirement of BEA's Dragon Rapides, BEA Helicopters took over the scheduled service between Land's End and the Isles of Scilly on 2 May 1964. On 1 September of that year, the service transferred from Land's End St Just airfield to a new, purpose-built heliport at Penzance.

==== BEA Airtours ====
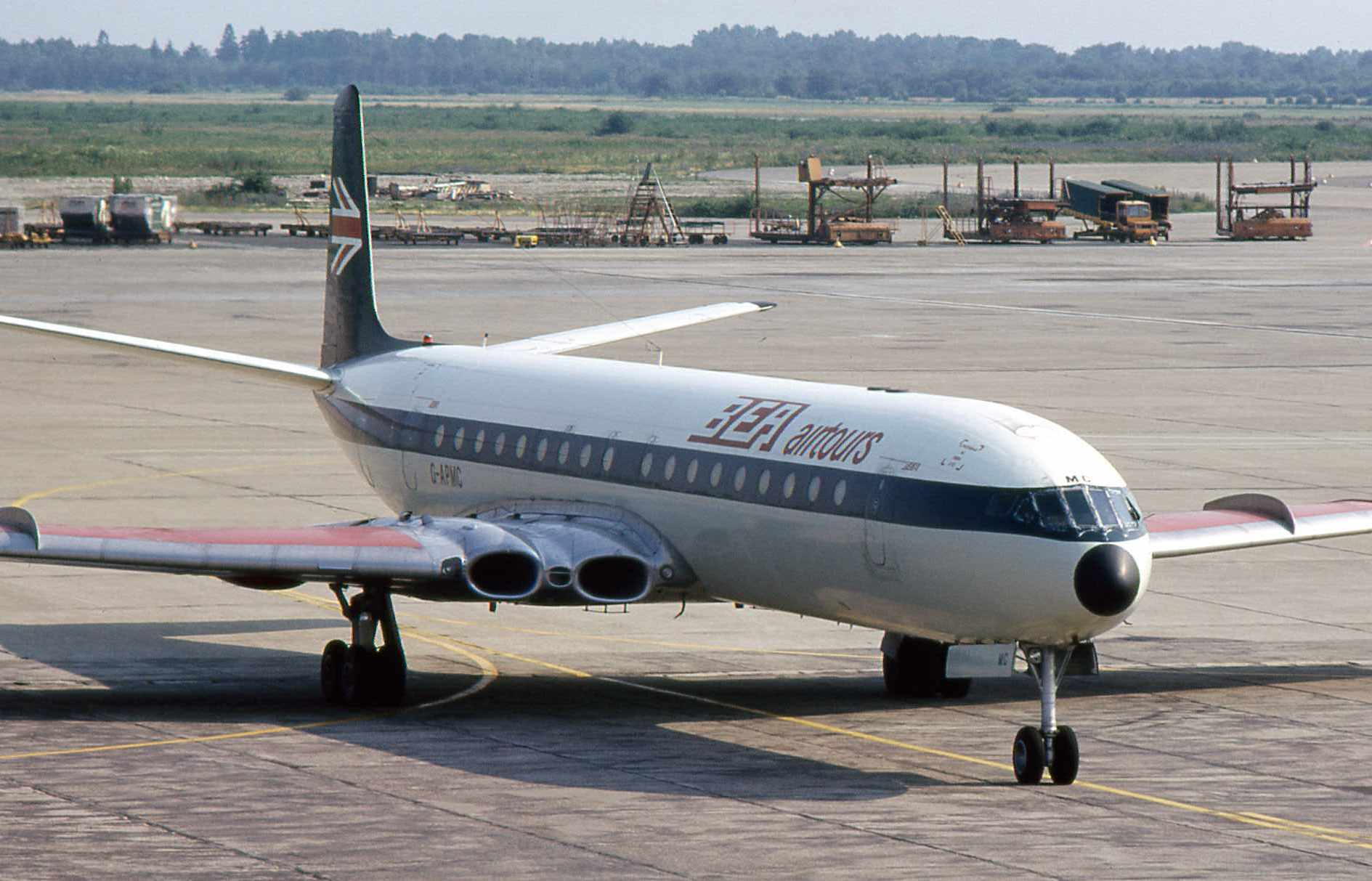
A BEA Airtours Comet 4B in basic BEA "Speedjack" livery at Pisa, Italy, 1973

On 24 April 1969, BEA formed BEA Airtours as a wholly owned, non-IATA subsidiary to provide it with a low-cost platform to participate in the then rapidly growing IT holiday flights market, which until then had been the exclusive domain of the independent airlines. On 6 March 1970, BEA Airtours commenced operations from London Gatwick with a fleet of seven second-hand ex-BEA de Havilland Comet series 4B aircraft seating 109 passengers in a single-class high-density configuration. On that day, BEA Airtours' first revenue flight departed Gatwick for Palma de Mallorca.

==== British Air Services ====
Following establishment of British Air Services as BEA's new holding company for its two loss-making regional airline subsidiaries, BKS Air Transport and Cambrian Airways, in March 1970, the corporation acquired a two-thirds majority shareholding in British Air Services in the autumn of that year to ensure its regional partners' survival. While this arrangement transferred overall control of BKS and Cambrian to BEA, it left the former's identities and local managements in place. This effectively gave BEA the final say in all major policy matters and delegated the day-to-day running of the two smaller airlines to their respective managements. BEA subsequently increased its shareholding in British Air Services to 70%. BEA's amalgamation with BOAC to form British Airways on 1 April 1974, resulted in the dissolution of British Air Services and the merger of its constituent members with BEA's Scottish and Channel Islands divisions into a new British Airways Regional Division.

==== Cyprus Airways ====
Cyprus Airways was established on 24 September 1947, as a joint venture between BEA, the British Colonial Government of Cyprus and private interests. Operations commenced on 18 April 1948, with three Douglas DC-3 aircraft. The aeroplanes, which carried 21 passengers each, flew on a route network centred on Nicosia Airport that included Rome, London (via Athens), Beirut, Athens, Cairo, Istanbul, and Haifa. During the next three years the airline purchased an additional three DC-3 aircraft and introduced services to Alexandria, Amman, Bahrain, Khartoum (via Haifa) and Lod.

In 1952, BEA took over the Cyprus Airways service to London with an Airspeed Ambassador, which featured a pressurized cabin that allowed nonstop routing avoiding a stopover in Athens. On 18 April 1953, BEA began using its newly delivered Vickers Viscount 701 on their scheduled service from London to Rome and Athens. The continuing sector from Athens to Nicosia was operated by BEA under charter to Cyprus Airways. This route from London to Nicosia was the world's first regular turboprop service.

In September 1957, with the political situation deteriorating in Cyprus, Cyprus Airways entered into a five-year agreement with BEA for the latter to operate services on its behalf. As a result, BEA took over the operation of all Cyprus Airways services from 26 January 1958.

Following independence for Cyprus in 1960, the government of newly independent island became the majority shareholder in Cyprus Airways, with a 53.2 per cent holding, while BEA's stake was reduced to 22.7 per cent. Private individuals held the rest. Thereafter, Cypriot nationals began to be hired and trained for the flight crews, which had previously been made up of British expatriates from BEA. Cyprus Airways still relied on BEA for aircraft and in 1961 BEA began introducing Comet 4B jets on all Cyprus Airways routes through a joint aircraft pool arrangement that included Greece's Olympic Airways. On 5 April 1960, BEA introduced de Havilland Comet 4B aircraft on the Nicosia, Athens, Rome, and London routes. With the introduction of the Comets, Cyprus Airways became the first airline in the Middle East to have jet airplanes. The Comets flew in the BEA livery, but had the Cyprus Airways logo and title above their doors. In 1965, Cyprus began leasing its own Viscounts from BEA for regional routes. The Comet and Viscount aircraft were replaced with five Trident jets, three of them acquired from BEA. The first Hawker Siddeley Trident jet was introduced in September 1969. Cyprus also leased a BAC 1–11. The faster planes allowed more European trade centres (Frankfurt, Manchester, Brussels, and Paris) to be added to the timetable.

British Airways finally divested itself of its former BEA stake in Cyprus Airways in 1981, selling its shares to the Government of Cyprus.

== Fleet ==
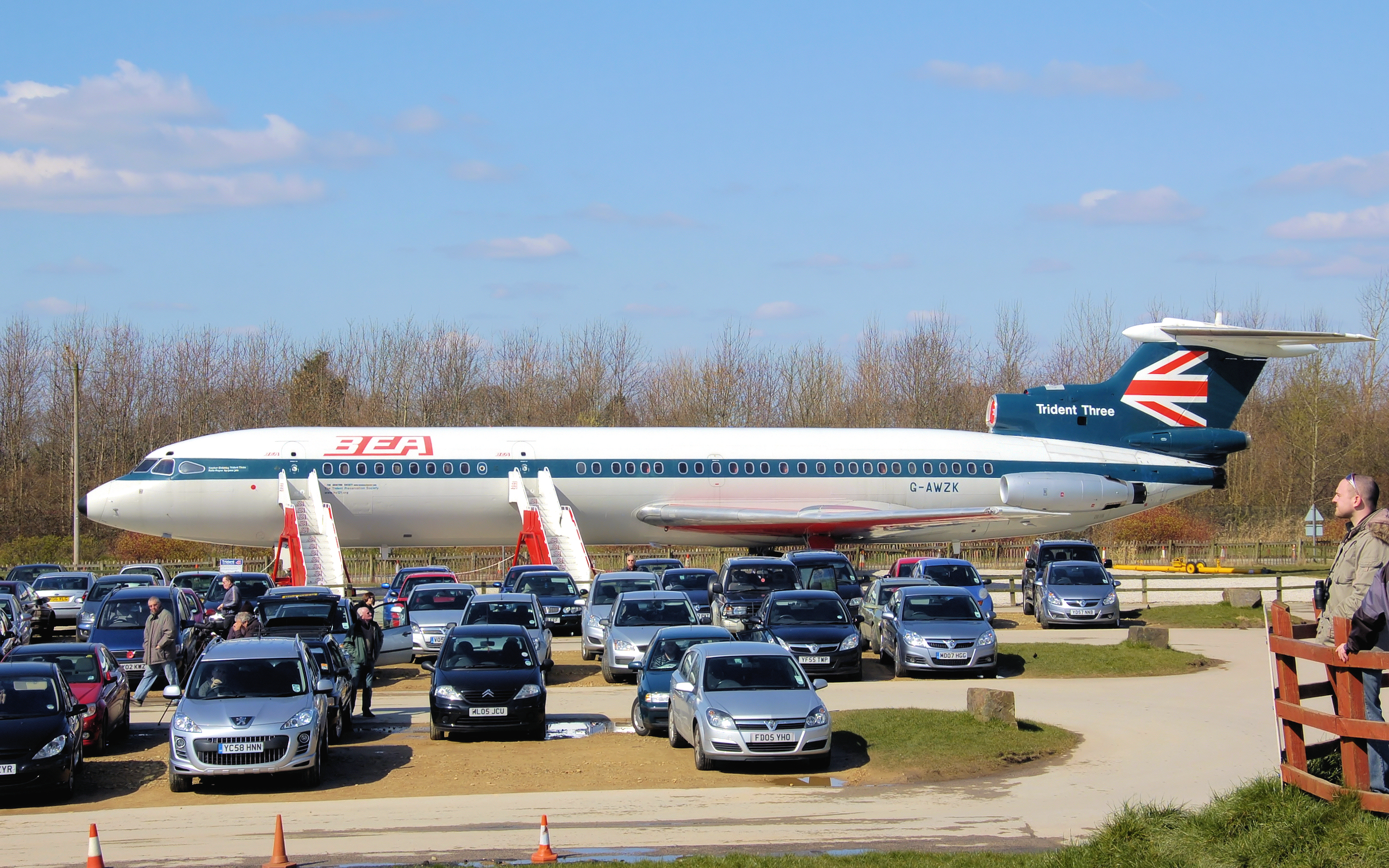
Ex-British European Airways Trident 3B (G-AWZK) preserved at Manchester Airport in BEA "Speedjack" livery. Delivered new in 1971, it flew for BEA and British Airways, retiring in 1985.

=== BEA fleet ===
Dates below are for service with BEA and BEA Airtours, those still in service in 1974 subsequently passed to British Airways.

BEA fleet
Aircraft	Total	Introduced	Retired	Notes
Airspeed AS 57 Ambassador	22	1951	1961	
Avro Anson and XIX	16	1946	1950	
Avro Lancastrian	6	1947	1948	
BAC One-Eleven series 500	18	1969	1974	Transferred to British Airways
Bristol 170 Freighter	1	1950	1952	
Bristol 175 Britannia	3	1961	1961	Leased from BOAC
de Havilland DH.84 Dragon	1	1947	1949	
de Havilland DH.86 Express	1	1947	1958	Written off
de Havilland DH.89A Dragon Rapide	53	1947	1964	
de Havilland DH.90 Dragonfly	1	1955	1956	
de Havilland DH.106 Comet 4B	17	1959	1972	
de Havilland DH.114 Heron	5	1955	1974	
Douglas C-47 Skytrain	78	1946	1962	
Handley-Page HPR.7 Herald 100	4	1962	1968	
Hawker Siddeley 121 Trident 1C/E	26	1964	1974	Transferred to British Airways
Hawker Siddeley 121 Trident 2E	16	1968	1974	Transferred to British Airways
Hawker Siddeley 121 Trident 3B	28	1971	1974	Transferred to British Airways
Junkers Ju 52/3m	11	1947	1948	
Lockheed L-1011 TriStar	1	1972	1972	Demonstration use only
Short SC.7 Skyvan	3	1971	1974	
Vickers Vanguard 953C	20	1960	1974	Transferred to British Airways
Vickers Viking	80	1946	1956	
Vickers Viscount 600	1	1950	1950	
Vickers Viscount 700	32	1952	1963	
Vickers Viscount 700D	4	1958	1961	
Vickers Viscount 800	43	1957	1974	

=== BEA Helicopters fleet ===
The early helicopters of all types were collectively known as the "King Arthur"-class. Dates are for service with BEA Helicopters, those still in service in 1974 subsequently passed to British Airways Helicopters.

BEA Helicopters fleet
Aircraft	Total	Introduced	Retired	Notes
Bell 47	2	1947	1964	
Bell 47J Ranger	1	1959	1965	
Bell 206A Jet Ranger	1	1968	1974	Transferred to British Airways Helicopters
Bell 212	1	1972	1974	Transferred to British Airways Helicopters
Bristol 171 Sycamore	3	1951	1964	
Sikorsky S-51	4	1947	1954	
Sikorsky S-61N	8	1964	1974	Transferred to British Airways Helicopters
Westland Whirlwind WS.55	3	1954	1968	

== Aircraft on display ==
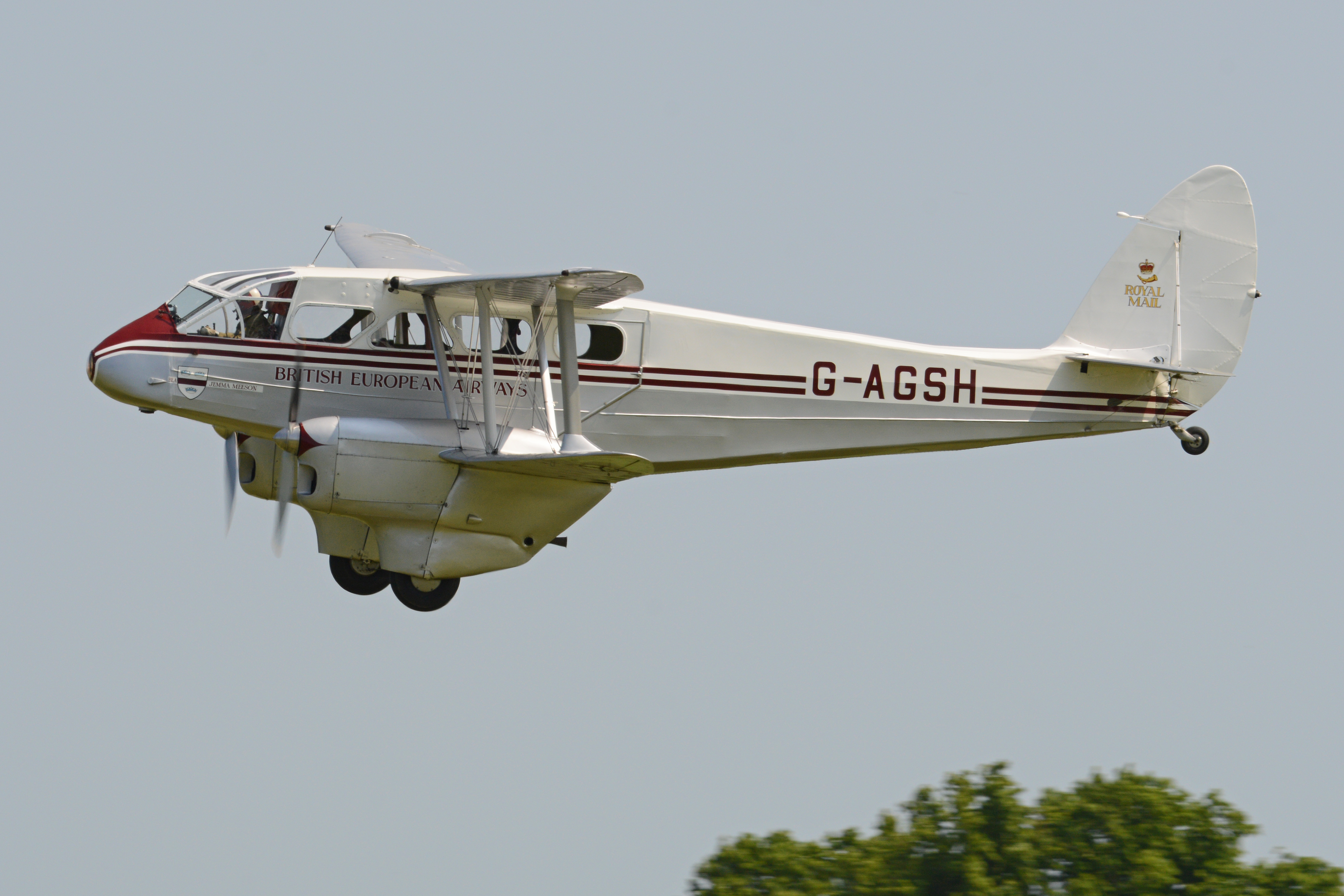
Dragon Rapide G-AGSH at Old Warden airfield

The following aircraft are on public display in British European Airways markings:

- DH89A G-AGSH is on display at the Shuttleworth Collection in Old Warden, Bedfordshire.
- Handley Page Dart Herald G-APWA is on display at the Museum of Berkshire Aviation. Woodley, Berkshire, England
- Hawker Siddeley Trident 2E G-AVFB is on display at the Imperial War Museum Duxford, England.
- Vickers Viking G-AGRU is on display at the Brooklands Museum, Surrey, England.
- Vickers Viscount 701 G-ALWF is on display at the Imperial War Museum Duxford, England.

== Incidents and accidents ==
- On 7 August 1946, Flight 530, a Douglas C-47A (G-AHCS) crashed into trees on Mistberget mountain while on approach to Oslo Airport, Gardermoen due to pilot error, killing 3 of 15 on board.
- On 15 April 1947, de Havilland Dragon Rapide G-AHKR crashed into Slieau Ruy while operating a scheduled passenger flight from Speke Airport, Liverpool, Lancashire to Ronaldsway Airport, Isle of Man. There were only minor injuries among the six people on board.
- On 6 January 1948, Vickers Viking 1B G-AHPK crashed at Ruislip on approach to RAF Northolt after flying into trees in low visibility killing the pilot and injuring 8 others.
- On 5 April 1948, Vickers Viking 1B G-AIVP operating that day's scheduled flight from RAF Northolt via Hamburg to RAF Gatow in Berlin collided during its approach to RAF Gatow with a Soviet Air Force Yakovlev Yak-3 fighter which had been flying dangerously close while performing aerobatics in the area at the time. As a result of the collision, the Viking spiralled out of control and crashed 1.9 mi (3.1 km) from the airport on East German territory (Note: at the time the Soviet Zone of Occupation) killing all 14 on board. The Soviet fighter pilot was also killed. The accident happened during a period of heightened Cold War tensions over Berlin when Soviet military aircraft frequently "buzzed" Western commercial aircraft inside the Allied air corridors. A British inquiry determined that the Soviet pilot's action, which contravened all accepted rules of flying and the specific quadripartite flying rules to which the Soviets were party, was the cause of the accident. The Soviets rejected these findings and blamed the British flightdeck crew instead.
- On 21 April 1948, Flight S200P, a Vickers Viking 1B (G-AIVE), crashed into Irish Law Mountain on approach to Renfrew Airport, Scotland. None of the 20 passengers and crew were killed in the accident but 13 were injured and the aircraft was written off.
- On 30 July 1948, Douglas Dakota C.3 G-AGIX flying from Edinburgh to London belly landed in a field near Sywell following engine problems. All on board survived.
- On 19 February 1949, Douglas C-47A G-AHCW flying from Northolt to Renfrew collided in mid-air with Royal Air Force Avro Anson trainer VV243 near Coventry killing all 14 passengers and crew on both aircraft. Neither aircraft had seen the other despite clear weather, and the accident was blamed on neither maintaining an adequate look out.
- On 19 August 1949, Douglas C-47A G-AHCY crashed into a hill 15 mi (24 km) short of the flight's destination at Manchester Airport due to a navigation error and pilot error, killing 24 out of 32 passengers and crew.
- On 13 April 1950, Vickers Viking 1B G-AIVL "Vigilant" was on a flight from London-Northolt Airport to Paris over the English Channel near Hastings when a French passenger was suspected of making a suicide attempt after a bomb exploded in the rear toilet compartment, tearing a hole 8 ft (2.4 m) tall by 4 ft (1.2 m) wide in the fuselage. The flight returned to Northolt and landed safely. The passenger and a flight attendant were injured in the blast. The captain, Ian Harvey DFC, a former RAF Bomber Command pilot, was awarded the George Medal for the "coolness" that had characterised his deportment, throughout the incident: "In the face of this very grave emergency the action of Captain Harvey is worthy of the highest praise. The complete loss of the aircraft and all its company was avoided only as a result of his courage, high skill and presence of mind." The Flight Safety Foundation also honoured Harvey and his crew with an award. An official inquiry confirmed that a bomb had been detonated in the Viking's lavatory, but there was no evidence of how it had been done. The investigation revealed no motive for the attack. Material relating to it in the Public Record Office has been released and is available from The National Archives.
- On 17 October 1950, Douglas Dakota C.3 G-AGIW crashed in Mill Hill shortly after takeoff on a flight from RAF Northolt to Renfrew Airport. The accident killed 28 passengers and crew, leaving an only survivor, flight attendant James McKissick. The crew had shut down the No.2 engine after it developed problems, leaving the aircraft without sufficient power to clear high ground.
- On 31 October 1950, Vickers Viking 1B G-AHPN "Lord St Vincent" crashed in bad weather and poor visibility at London Airport after the aircraft struck the runway and went off the end of the runway and caught fire killing 28 out of 30 passengers and crew
- On 5 January 1953, Vickers Viking 1B G-AJDL "Lord St Vincent" crashed on approach to Belfast Nutts Corner Airport due to pilot error, killing 27 out of 35 on board.
- On 12 August 1953, Vickers Viking 1B G-AIVG landed wheels-up after a landing gear tire blew out, all on board survived. Although the aircraft was written off and withdrawn from use, it was moved to the Musée National de L'automobile de Mulhouse around 1970 and then moved to EuroAirport for restoration in 2004.
- On 20 January 1956, Vickers Viscount 701 G-AMOM crashed on takeoff from Blackbushe Airport on a training flight due to a loss of power in two engines; all five crew on board survived, but the aircraft was written off. The training captain was simulating a number four engine failure and had pulled the high pressure cock on the number three engine by mistake and throttled back the number four engine, causing a loss of power in both engines three and four.
- On 14 March 1957, Flight 411, a Vickers Viscount 701 (G-ALWE, "RMA Discovery"), crashed on approach to Manchester Airport due to a flap failure caused by metal fatigue. All 20 occupants on board died along with two on the ground. A bolt that held the bottom of the number two starboard flap unit broke, causing the aileron to become locked; this led to a loss of control.
- On 28 September 1957, de Havilland Heron 1B G-AOFY, while operating a flight for the Scottish Air Ambulance Service, crashed on approach to Port Ellen/Glenegedale Airport, Islay, in bad weather. The three occupants, two crew and one nurse (a volunteer from Glasgow's Southern General Hospital) were killed. One of the remaining two Herons was named Sister Jean Kennedy after the nurse; the other after James Young Simpson, a Scottish pioneer in anaesthetics.
- On 23 October 1957, Vickers Viscount 802 G-AOJA on a flight from Heathrow Airport crashed after overshooting on approach to Belfast Nutts Corner Airport, killing all seven on board; the cause was not determined.
- On 17 November 1957, Vickers Viscount 802 G-AOHP crashed at Ballerup, Denmark, after the failure of three engines on approach to Copenhagen Airport. Both crew members survived. (There were no passengers on board the aircraft as this was an all-cargo flight.) The cause was a malfunction of the anti-icing system on the aircraft.
- On 6 February 1958, Flight 609 crashed in a blizzard on its third attempt to take off from an icy runway at the Munich Riem Airport in Germany. On board the plane was the Manchester United football team, along with supporters and journalists. Twenty-three of the 43 passengers died. The accident is known as the "Munich Air Disaster". The charter flight was operated by Airspeed Ambassador 2 G-ALZU, Lord Burleigh.
- On 28 April 1958, Vickers Viscount 802 G-AORC crashed at Craigie, South Ayrshire on approach to Glasgow Prestwick Airport when the pilot misread the altimeter by a margin of 10,000 ft (3,000 m). All five occupants on board survived.
- On 16 May 1958, Douglas Dakota C.3 G-AGHP crashed at Chatenoy, France while flying in a storm as a result of structural failure, killing the crew of three.
- On 22 October 1958, Flight 142, a Vickers Viscount 701C (G-ANHC), was struck by an Italian Air Force F-86E Sabre and crashed at Anzio, Italy with the loss of all 31 on board; the F-86 pilot was able to eject and survived.
- On 5 January 1960, Vickers Viscount 701 G-AMNY was damaged beyond economic repair at Luqa Airport, Malta, when it departed the runway after landing following a loss of hydraulic pressure. Although the aircraft came to rest against the airport's control tower, there were no fatalities among the 51 occupants (five crew, 46 passengers).
- On 7 January 1960, Vickers Viscount 802 G-AOHU was damaged beyond economic repair when the nose wheel collapsed on landing at Heathrow Airport due to ATC error. A fire then developed and nearly burnt-out the fuselage. There were no casualties among the 59 people on board.
- On 21 December 1961, British European Airways Flight 226, a de Havilland Comet 4B (G-ARJM) operating on behalf of Cyprus Airways from London to Tel Aviv, stalled and crashed on takeoff from Esenboğa Airport, Ankara, Turkey. The aircraft was destroyed in the crash killing 27 of 34 on board. The cause was attributed to a fault with the horizon direction indicator giving the pilot a false indication and therefore leading him to put the aircraft in the wrong attitude. BEA and their underwriters began action in 1969 against the manufacturer of the indicator. The manufacturer stated they would defend the action and show that the cause was the pilot suffering a heart attack and the crew being negligent with flightdeck procedures.
- On 4 July 1965, Armstrong Whitworth Argosy 222 G-ASXL crashed into a hilltop near Piacenza, Italy due to a navigation error. Although the aircraft was destroyed, both pilots survived.
- On 27 October 1965, Vickers Vanguard G-APEE on a flight from Edinburgh crashed onto the runway during an approach in bad weather at London Heathrow Airport due to pilot error. All 36 on board died.
- On 12 October 1967, Cyprus Airways Flight 284 operated by BEA de Havilland Comet 4B G-ARCO on behalf of Cyprus Airways, exploded in mid-air over the Mediterranean and crashed into the sea with the loss of all 66 on board. The explosion was caused by a device under a passenger seat.
- On 4 December 1967, Armstrong Whitworth Argosy 222 G-ASXP crashed on a training flight at Stansted during a simulated engine failure, as a result of loss of control. Although the aircraft caught fire on impact, all three crew members survived.
- On 3 July 1968, Hawker Siddeley Trident 1C G-ARPT was destroyed on the ground at London Heathrow when BKS Air Transport Airspeed Ambassador G-AMAD crashed at the airport. The Ambassador's impact cut the stationary Trident in half and severed the tailfin of another Trident parked next to it. While this made G-ARPT a complete write-off, the aircraft next to it, Trident 1C G-ARPI, was subsequently repaired and re-entered service. (The latter aircraft would be involved in the worst accident in BEA's history as well as the worst involving a Trident, in terms of fatalities, on 18 June 1972.) As at the time of the accident both Tridents were empty and not being attended to while parked on the airport ramp, no BEA passengers or staff were among the fatalities.
- On 2 October 1971, Flight 706, a Vickers Vanguard (G-APEC), crashed near Aarsele, Belgium, following a mid-air rupture of the rear pressure bulkhead due to severe, undetected corrosion. All 63 on board died.
- On 18 June 1972, Flight 548, a Hawker Siddeley Trident 1C (G-ARPI), the aircraft that had been repaired and returned to service after being struck by BKS Air Transport Ambassador G-AMAD at Heathrow on 3 July 1968, crashed two minutes after takeoff from Heathrow Airport, killing all 118 passengers and crew. The accident occurred close to the town of Staines, Middlesex. This was the worst accident in BEA's history as well as the worst involving a Trident, in terms of fatalities. It was also the worst on British soil until 1988.
- On 19 January 1973, Vickers Viscount 802 G-AOHI crashed into Ben More, Perthshire while on a test flight. All four people on board were killed.

== Liveries ==
=== Late-1940s – early-1950s ===
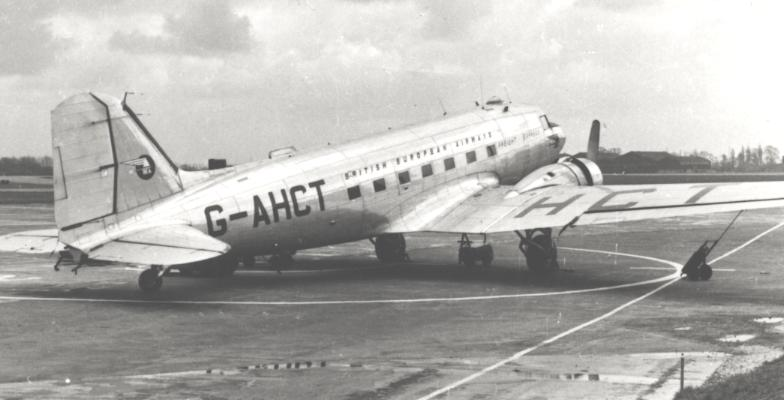
BEA Douglas DC-3 freighter in early bare metal colour scheme in 1951.

BEA's early liveries in the late-1940s to early-1950s mainly consisted of a bare metal finish with upper case, black British European Airways titles above the cabin windows on each side of the fuselage, the aircraft registration in bold, black capital letters on each side of the rear fuselage as well as on the underside of each wing, and a contemporary BEA logo on each side of the forward fuselage featuring a stylised wing and BEA in capital letters on each side of the nose. Additionally, Vikings featured a name given to individual aircraft in black capital letters each side of the nose.

=== Early-1950s – late-1950s ===
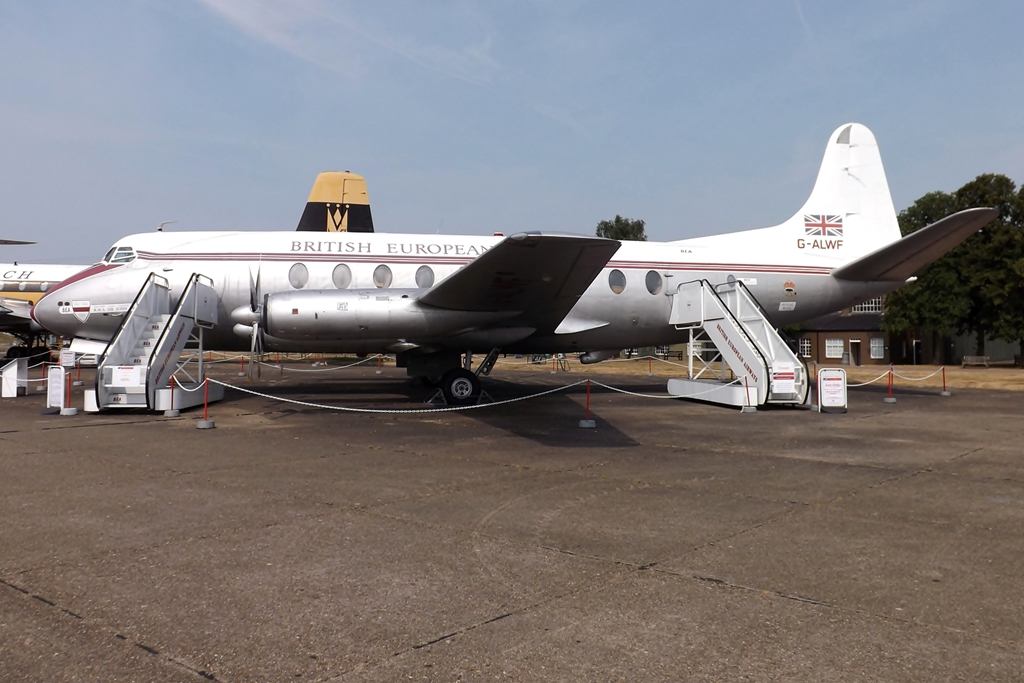
BEA Viscount 701 G-ALWF RMA Sir John Franklin in bare metal finish livery incorporating a burgundy cheatline separated by two thin, white lines above the cabin windows on static display at the Imperial War Museum's Duxford Aerodrome

By the early-1950s, the bare metal finish on most BEA aircraft had evolved to incorporate a burgundy cheatline separated by two thin, white lines above the cabin windows on each side of the fuselage. This cheatline was in turn separated by upper case, burgundy British European Airways titles in the middle. The bottom, burgundy part of this cheatline extended below the flightdeck windows to converge on the nose, with the space in-between painted black (matte finish) to reduce glare for the pilots and shield sensitive navigational equipment housed in the nose from radiation. There was a contemporary BEA logo on each side of the forward fuselage featuring a stylised wing and BEA in capital letters on each side of the nose. In addition to the aircraft registration, there was also a coat of arms on each side of the rear fuselage and a small Union Flag each side of the lower part of the tail. The letters BEA appeared in bold, upper case on the upper left and lower right wing while the aircraft registration appeared in bold, upper case on the upper right and lower left wing. Later adaptations of this livery used on DC-3s/Pionairs featured an unbroken cheatline with large, upper case British European Airways titles on a white upper fuselage and a larger Union flag, as well as the aircraft registration each side of a white tail and the aircraft's name prominently displayed in a white field on the left side of the nose and a coat of arms on its right side. When applied to BEA's Elizabethans, this lacked British European Airways titles due to the aircraft's high-wing configuration that left insufficient space on the upper fuselage.

=== Late-1950s – late-1960s ===
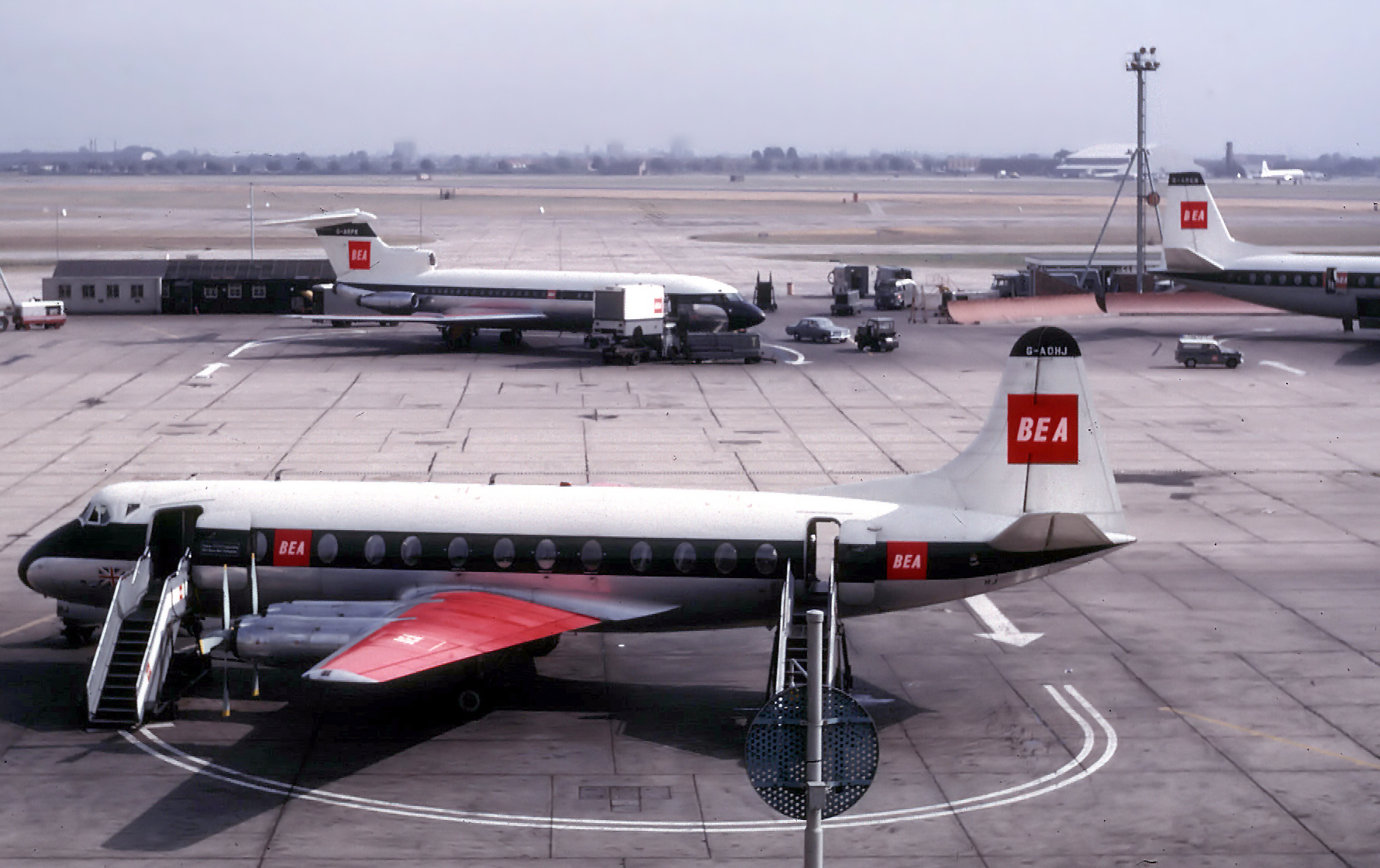
Three BEA aircraft in the red, black and white livery at Heathrow in 1964. In the foreground a Vickers Viscount 802, right background a Vickers Vanguard, left background a Hawker Siddeley Trident 1C (note the red port wing of the aircraft in the foreground).

From the late-1950s to the late-1960s, BEA's aircraft wore its red, black and white livery, which was uniformly applied to the entire fleet from September 1959. It consisted of a prominent BEA logo featuring the three-letter abbreviation of the airline's name in upper case white in a red square each side of a white tail as well as near the front and rear passenger doors on the left fuselage and near the service door[s] on its right side, where it interrupted an otherwise continuous, thick black cheatline across the cabin windows on each side of the fuselage. The cheatlines on each side of the fuselage converged on the nose, with the space in-between painted black (matte finish) as well to reduce glare for the pilots and shield sensitive navigational equipment housed in the nose from radiation. The upper part of the fuselage (above the thick black cheatline) was all-white while its lower part (below the thick black cheatline) was in natural metal finish or painted light-grey. The engines retained their natural metal finish as well while the wings were red, both on the upper and underside, with the BEA logo featuring the three-letter abbreviation of the airline's name in upper case white in a square appearing on each wing's upper side and the aircraft registration in bold, white capital letters on each wing's underside. This livery, which was also known as the "red square" livery because of its prominent display of the red-square BEA logo in multiple locations on the aircraft, featured the Union flag near the front passenger door on the silver/light-grey lower fuselage. It furthermore had the aircraft type on/near both front passenger/forward service doors in white letters on a black background (cheatline) and the aircraft registration in white capital letters on a black background each side of the tail (a thin, black horizontal strip at/near the top of the fin).

=== Late-1960s – mid-1970s ===
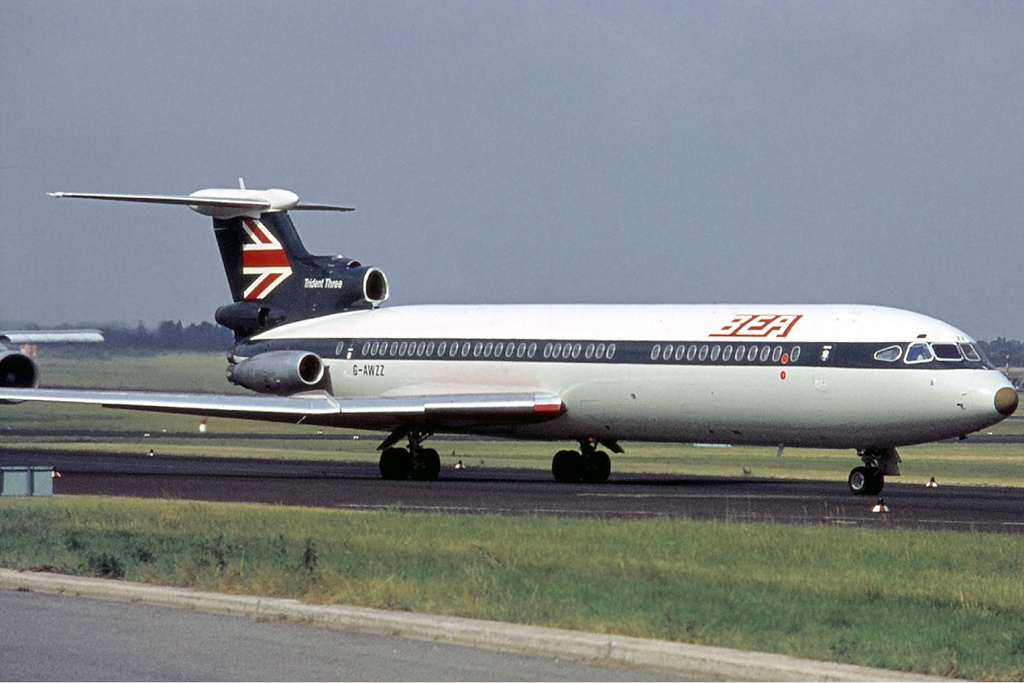
Trident 3B G-AWZZ in BEA "Speedjack" livery, seen taxiing at Düsseldorf Lohausen Airport, Germany, 1973

From the late-1960s, BEA's aircraft began to appear in the "Speedjack" livery. This was the airline's final livery. Like the previous red, black and white livery, it was uniformly applied to its entire fleet. (Note: except BAC One-Eleven 500s which wore a modified livery featuring a neutral, dark-blue fin with Super One-Eleven titles instead of the BEA "Speedjack" for the duration of the BEA-Air France joint venture (spring 1969 – autumn 1972)) It consisted of a dark-blue cheatline across the cabin windows on each side of the fuselage, extending in a straight line from the flightdeck windows to the tail cone/tail engine exhaust/auxiliary power unit exhaust. The upper part of the fuselage (above the dark-blue cheatline) was all-white while its lower part (below the dark-blue cheatline) was light-grey. Unlike the earlier [predominantly] bare metal/white tail, liveries worn by BEA aircraft, the new livery featured a dark-blue tail with a prominent display of part of the Union flag in the shape of an arrow that symbolised an aircraft (composed of a fuselage with swept wings) on each side. The arrow-shaped part of the Union flag symbolising an aircraft became known as the "Speedjack" motif. Tridents wearing this livery also displayed the type's name (Trident for Trident 1C/1E, Trident Two for Trident 2E and Trident Three for Trident 3B) in white letters each side of the dark-blue centre engine while One-Eleven 500s wearing it displayed the type's name (Super one-eleven) in white letters on a dark-blue horizontal strip on each of their bare metal engines. This livery furthermore differed from its two immediate predecessors by only having the tip of the nose cone painted black (matte finish). All aircraft wearing this livery also featured the three-letter abbreviation of the airline's name in upper case white framed with a red border to emphasise the shape of the letters, which appeared above the dark-blue cheatline near the passenger/forward service doors each side of the white upper fuselage. In the case of regional feeder aircraft, the three-letter abbreviation of the airline's name was followed by the respective operating division's name in lower case dark-blue letters (e.g. scottish airways). The only aspect of the previous livery that was retained for all mainline aircraft were the red wings (both upper and undersides), with the aircraft registration in bold, white capital letters on each wing's underside. Following the merger with BOAC, many former BEA aircraft retained their basic "Speedjack" livery with just the name changing from red-framed, white BEA to dark-blue British airways pending repainting in the red, white and blue 1970s and early-80s Negus & Negus livery of British Airways.

== City centre check-in facilities ==
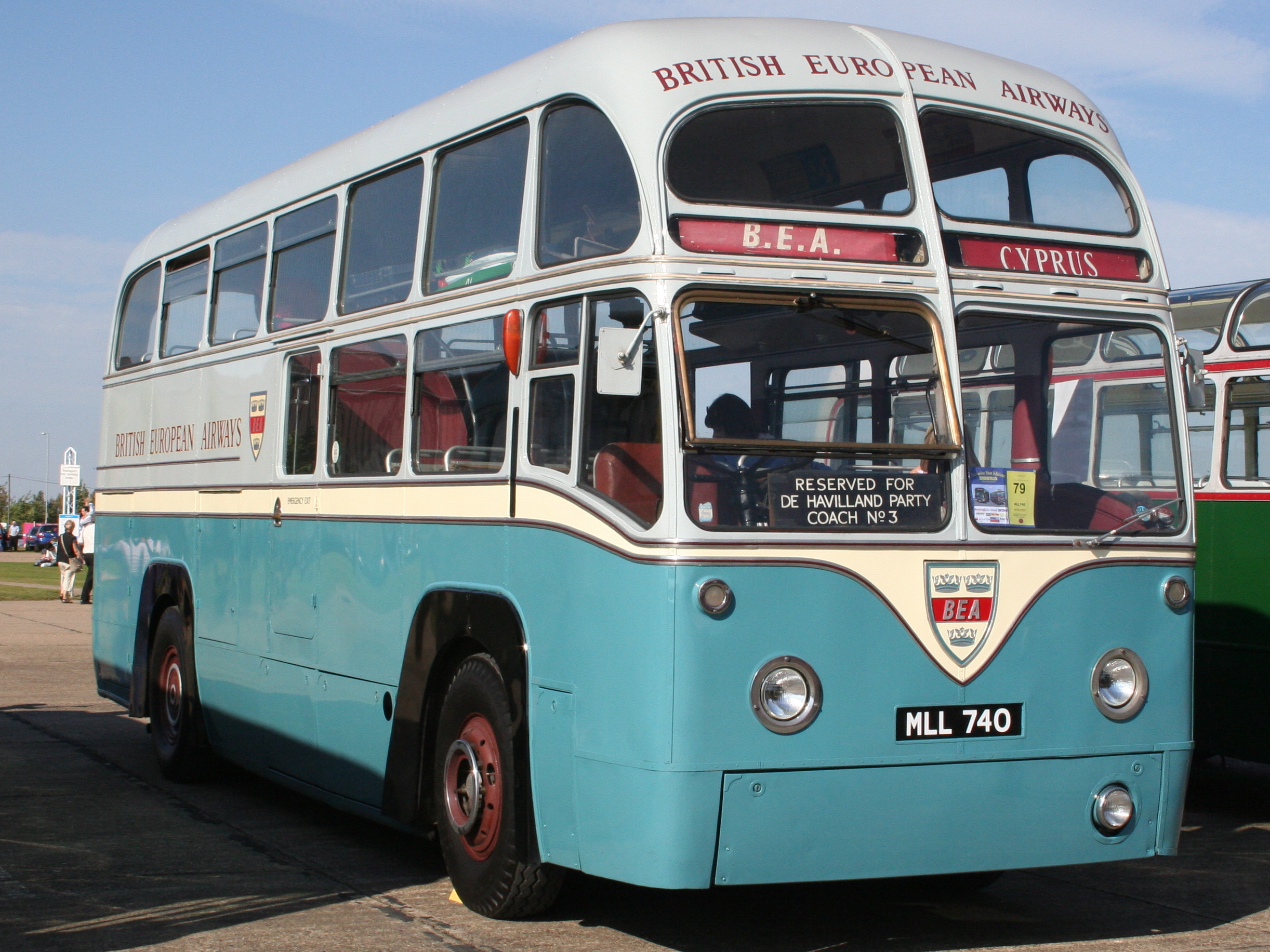
A preserved AEC Regal IV bus, one of those used by BEA to ferry passengers between its Central London air terminals and the airport, at a rally in 2007

Following BEA's formation, its first Central London air terminal at which check-in facilities for passengers and baggage were available was located close to Victoria station. Before World War II, this facility had been used by Imperial Airways. When wartime restrictions on civil aviation in the UK were lifted, BEA began sharing it with BOAC. Once passengers had checked-in, they boarded one of the Commer Commando buses the airline provided to take them to Northolt. These 1½-deckers featured a raised seating area at the back, which increased the baggage space below.

On 31 May 1948, BEA moved its Central London check-in to Kensington Air Station, the first purpose-built facility for the exclusive use of BEA's passengers.

From 1952, BEA introduced new AEC Regal IV 1½-decker buses to carry its passengers from Central London to Northolt and Heathrow. London Transport operated these on BEA's behalf, in white/grey (later white/blue) livery.

In late 1953, BEA's Central London air terminal was moved again to a new site the Waterloo Air Terminal at next to Waterloo station on the south bank of the River Thames between the Houses of Parliament and the City of London. The Heathrow bus journey was now 20 minutes longer but an optional, more expensive, helicopter link was briefly operated from a South Bank helipad.

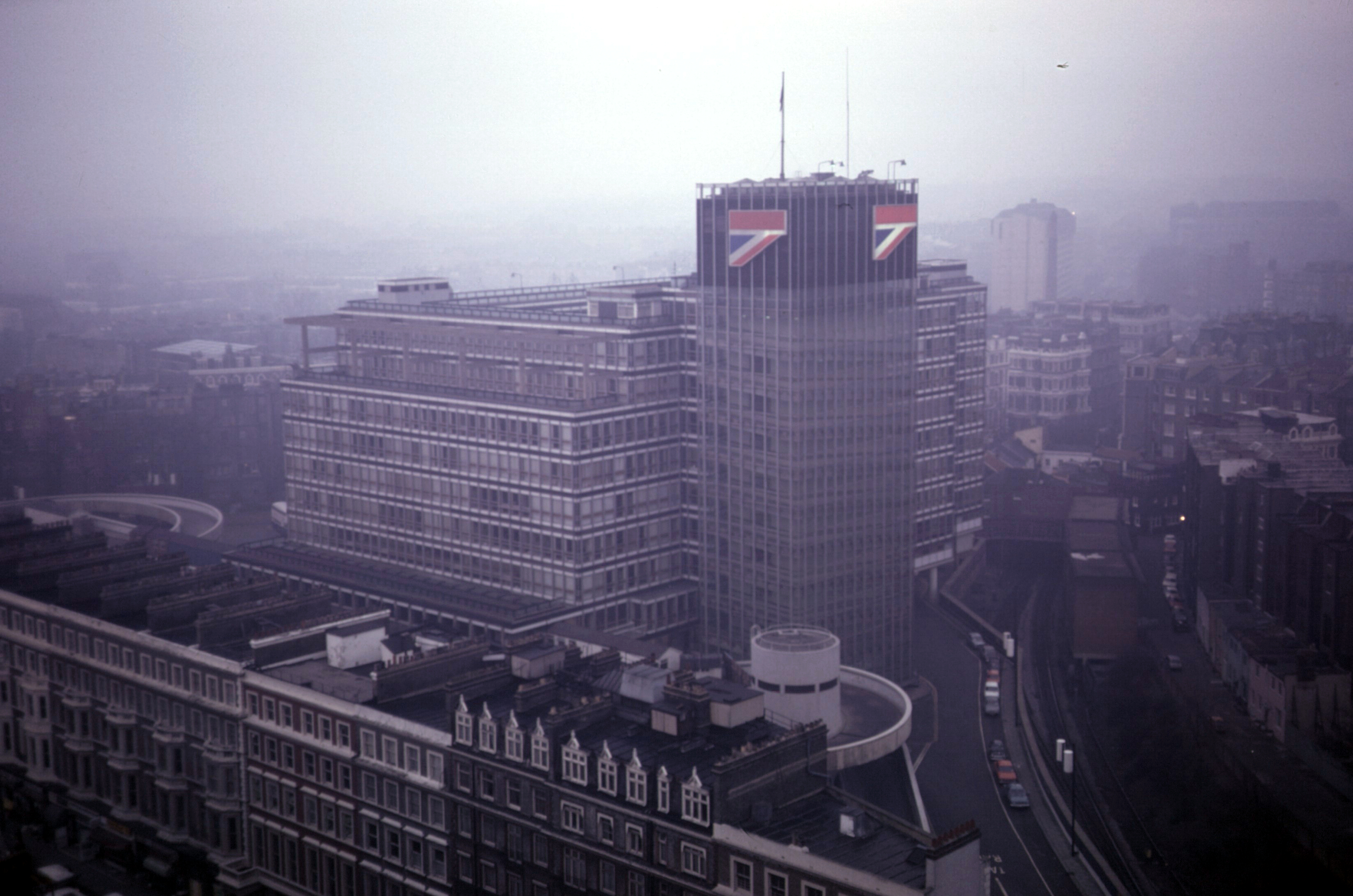
The West London Air Terminal in Kensington, 1976

On 6 October 1957, BEA relocated its Central London air terminal once more to the West London Air Terminal in Cromwell Road in London's Royal Borough of Kensington and Chelsea. This was a new, £5 million facility that was officially inaugurated upon completion in 1963.

In 1966, BEA introduced a fleet of double-decker London AEC Routemaster buses. These initially wore a blue and white livery, before being repainted in a white/grey livery, a white/blue livery incorporating BEA's "red square" logo and, finally, a white/red livery with Speedjack-style BEA lettering. The London Routemasters carried BEA's passengers from the West London Air Terminal to Heathrow and towed their baggage in large, two-wheeled trailers.

In 1974, British Airways withdrew the Central London check-in facilities it had inherited from BEA because of declining demand and closed the West London Air Terminal. This resulted in disposal of the dedicated fleet of Routemaster buses, some of which had already been repainted in the new red, white and blue Negus & Negus livery of British Airways.

== Reuse of name ==
Between June 2000 and July 2002, independent UK regional airline Jersey European Airways (JEA) revived the by then long-dormant British European name by adopting it as its new trading name to reflect JEA's UK-wide expansion and growing partnership with Air France. This also included the prefixing of all JEA flights with the former BEA two-letter, IATA airline identification code BE, which continued in use when JEA rebranded as Flybe on 18 July 2002.

== Arms ==
Coat of arms of British European Airways
Crest On a wreath of the colours in front of a sun in splendour rising Or a swift volant Sable. Escutcheon Argent a fesse Gules between three astral crowns Azure. Motto CLAVIS EUROPAE

== Bibliography ==
- Lo Bao, Phil (1989). An Illustrated History of British European Airways. Feltham (Middlesex): Browcom Group plc. ISBN 0-946141-39-8.
- Halford-MacLeod, G. (2006). Britain's airlines volume 1: 1946–1951. Tempus Publishing. ISBN 0-7524-3696-1.
- Halford-MacLeod, G. (2007). Britain's airlines volume 2: 1951-1964. The History Press.
- Halford-MacLeod, G. (2010). Britain's airlines volume 3: 1964 to deregulation. The History Press.
- Woodley, C. (2017). History of British European Airways 1946-1972. Pen & Sword.

== See also ==
- Aviation in the United Kingdom
- List of defunct airlines of the United Kingdom
- History of British Airways
