= Alpine =

Alpine may refer to any mountainous region. It may also refer to:

== Places ==
=== Europe ===
- Alps, a European mountain range
  - Alpine states, which overlap with the European range

=== Australia ===
- Alpine, New South Wales, a Northern Village
- Alpine National Park
- Alpine Shire, a local government area in Victoria

=== New Zealand ===
- Alpine Lake / Ata Puai, a lake in the West Coast Region of New Zealand

=== United States ===
- Alpine, DeKalb County, Alabama, an unincorporated community
- Alpine, Talladega County, Alabama, an unincorporated community
- Alpine (plantation), a historic plantation house in Talladega County, Alabama
- Alpine, Alaska, an unincorporated community
- Alpine, Arizona, an unincorporated community
- Alpine, California, a census-designated place (CDP) in San Diego County
- Alpine, Los Angeles County, California, a former unincorporated community also known as Harold
- Alpine County, California
- Lake Alpine, California, an unincorporated community
- Alpine, Georgia, an unincorporated community
- Alpine, Indiana, an unincorporated community
- Alpine Township, Michigan
- Alpine, Mississippi, an unincorporated community
- Alpine, New Jersey, a borough
- Alpine, New York, a hamlet
- Alpine, Oregon, an unincorporated community
- Alpine, Tennessee, an unincorporated community
- Alpine, Texas, a city
- Alpine, Utah, a city
- Alpine, Virginia, an unincorporated community
- Alpine, King County, Washington, a former town abandoned in 1929
- Alpine, Skagit County, Washington, two former villages, one each in the 19th and 20th centuries
- Alpine, Wyoming, a town

==== Lakes ====
- Lake Alpine, a lake in Alpine County, California
- Alpine Lake (Marin County, California), a reservoir in Marin County, California
- Alpine Lake (Central Sawtooth Wilderness), a glacial lake in Custer County, Idaho
- Alpine Lake (Northern Sawtooth Wilderness), a glacial lake in Custer County, Idaho

== Science and technology ==
=== Biology ===
- Alpine (goat), a breed of domestic goat
- Alpine plant, plants that grow at high elevations
- Erebia or Alpine butterfly, a genus of butterflies common in the Rocky Mountains of North America
- Parnassius or Alpine butterfly, a genus of butterflies in Eurasia
- Alpine fir (Abies lasiocarpa, or subalpine fir), a tree
- Alpine newt

=== Computing ===
- Alpine (email client), a free software email client
- Alpine Linux, a Linux distribution

=== Earth sciences ===
- Alpine climate, climate that is typical to higher altitudes
- Alpine tundra, a type of natural region or biome
- Alpine orogeny, in geology
- Alpine Fault, a geological fault running nearly the entire length of New Zealand's South Island

== Sport ==
- Alpine climbing, a branch of climbing in which the primary aim is very often to reach the summit of a mountain
- Alpine Endurance Team, an Endurance racing team and constructor
- Alpine F1 Team, a Formula One team and constructor
- Alpine Rally, a rally competition
- Alpine style, mountaineering in a self-sufficient manner
- Alpine skiing, also known as downhill skiing
- Alpine slide, a long chute on the side of a hill, usually built by ski resorts

== Transportation ==
=== Automobiles ===
- Automobiles Alpine, a French manufacturer of cars
- Alpine Electronics, a Japanese manufacturer of car audio and navigation systems
- Sunbeam Alpine, a sports car
- Chrysler Alpine, the compact car Simca 1307 in the UK
- Alpine F1 Team, Formula One team from 2021 onwards
  - Alpine Academy, young driver programme run by the Formula One team

=== Aviation ===
- Alpine Air Express, an American airline
- Auster Alpine, a 1950s British airplane
- ALPINE, the callsign of easyJet Europe

== Art, entertainment and media ==
- Alpine (band), an indie rock band from Melbourne, Australia
- Alpine (G.I. Joe), a fictional character in the G.I. Joe universe

== Other uses ==
- Alpine race, a historical ethnicity concept
- Alpine Elementary School (disambiguation)
- Alpine, a subdialect of Vivaro-Alpine within the Occitan language
- Alpine, a number of brands of beer produced by the Moosehead Brewery
- Alpine, a menthol cigarette brand once made by Philip Morris USA
- Alpine Electronics, a subsidiary of Alps Electric

== See also ==
- Geology of the Alps
- Alpine butterfly (disambiguation)
- Alpine Journal, a publication by the Alpine Club of London
- Alpin (disambiguation)
- Alpen (disambiguation)
- Swiss chalet style, an architectural style originally inspired by rural chalets in Switzerland and the Alpine regions of Central Europe
