= Alpini (disambiguation) =

The Alpini are elite soldiers of the Italian Army who specialize in mountain warfare.

Alpini may also refer to:

- Cesare Alpini (born 1956), Italian art historian from Crema, Lombardy
- Prospero Alpini (1553-1617), a Venetian physician and botanist known by the author abbreviation "Alpino"
- Alpini, an ancient tribe that inhabited Liguria (what is now north-western Italy)
- Alpino, a World War I destroyer of the Regia Marina (Italian Navy)

== See also ==
- Alpina (disambiguation)
- Alpine (disambiguation)
- Alpino (disambiguation)
- Ponte degli Alpini (Alpini's bridge), another name for the Ponte Vecchio, Bassano, a covered wooden pontoon bridge in Bassano del Grappa, Italy
