= Alpina (disambiguation) =

Alpina is a German automobile manufacturing company.

Alpina may also refer to:

- Alpina (moth), a genus of moth
- Alpina Productos Alimenticios, a Colombian dairy, food, and beverage company
- Alpina snowmobiles, an Italian brand of snowmobile manufactured by Alpina s.r.l
- Alpina Žiri, a Slovenian shoe company
- Alpina, a hamlet in Lewis County, New York
- Alpina Watches, a Swiss watchmaking company owned by Frederique Constant Holding SA

== See also ==
- Alpine (disambiguation)
- Alpini (disambiguation)
- Alpino (disambiguation)
- Porta Alpina, a proposed Swiss underground railway station
- Via Alpina, a network of five long-distance hiking trails in Europe
