= Cyprus Airways (1947–2015) =

Flag-carrier airline of Cyprus (1947–2015)

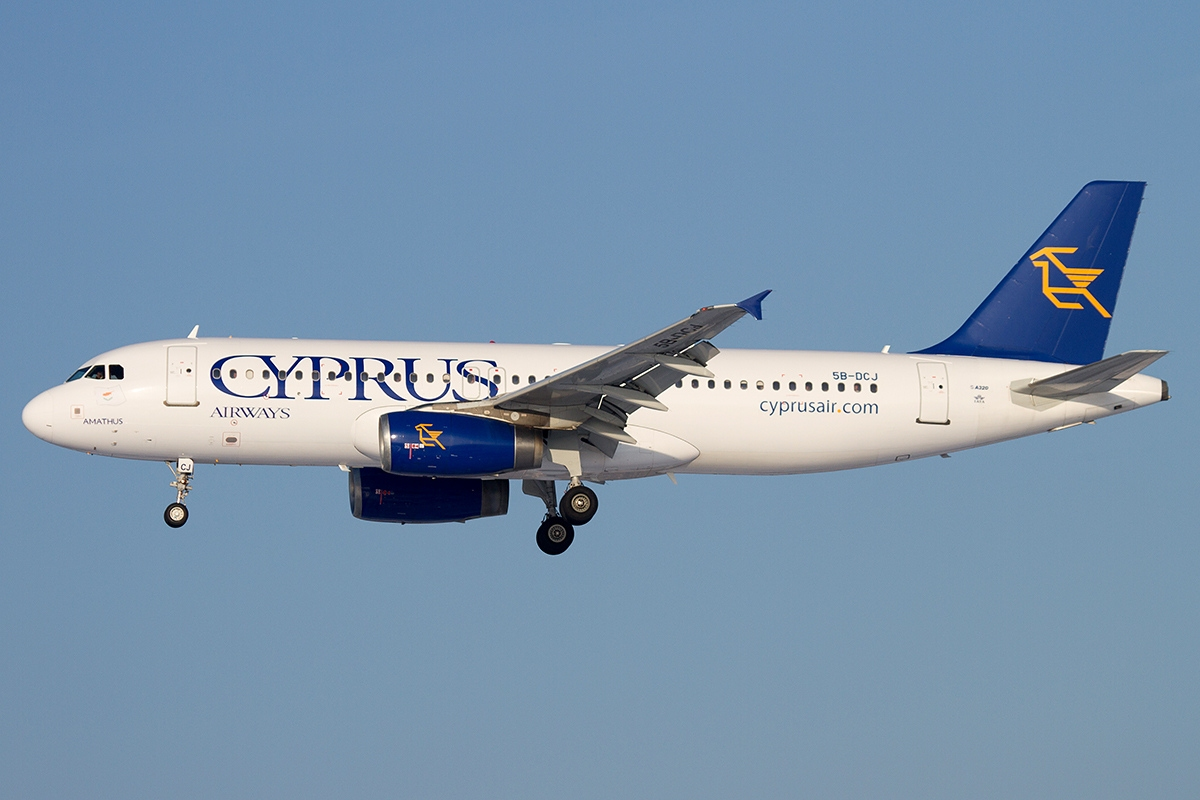
- Airbus A320
| IATA | ICAO | Call sign |
|---|---|---|
| CY | CYP | CYPRUS |
- Founded: 24 September 1947
- Commenced operations: 18 April 1948
- Ceased operations: 9 January 2015
- Operating bases: Larnaca International Airport
- Frequent-flyer program: Sunmiles
- Fleet size: 14
- Destinations: 13
- Parent company: Government of Cyprus
- Headquarters: Nicosia, Cyprus
- Key people: Aaron Karaoglanian (CEO)
- Website: www.cyprusair.com

Cyprus Airways (Public) Ltd. (Greek: Κυπριακές Αερογραμμές) was the flag carrier airline of Cyprus. It was established in September 1947 and ceased operations on 9 January 2015. Cyprus Airways had its operating base at Larnaca International Airport.

In July 2016, Charlie Airlines acquired the rights to use the Cyprus Airways trademarks and brand.

== History ==
=== Early years ===
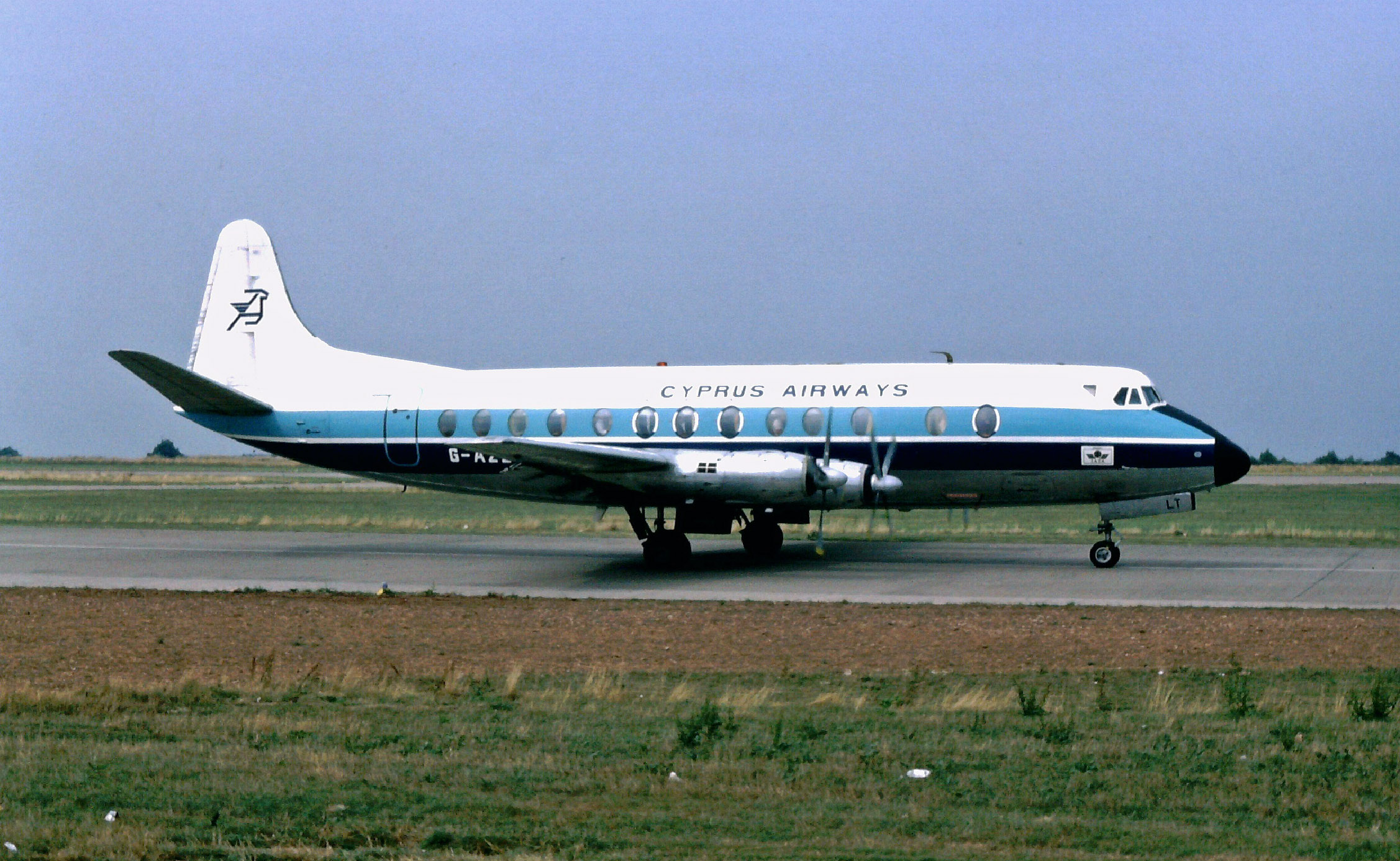
Vickers Viscount 800

Cyprus Airways was established on 24 September 1947 as a joint venture between the British Colonial Government of Cyprus, holding 40% of the share capital, British European Airways (BEA) and private interests owning the rest of the company. On the following October 6 scheduled operations operated by British European Airways were started. Own operations commenced on April 18 of the following year with three Douglas DC-3 aircraft. The planes, which carried 21 passengers each, flew on a route network centred on Nicosia that included Rome, London (via Athens), Beirut, Athens, Cairo, Istanbul, and Haifa. During the next three years, the airline purchased an additional three DC-3 aircraft and introduced services to Alexandria, Amman, Bahrain, Khartoum (via Haifa) and Lod.

In its early years, Cyprus Airways was operated effectively as a subsidiary of BEA, not only in its ownership structure, but in its use of BEA crew and cabin staff, and BEA aircraft. In part, this was due to restrictions placed on BEA by the British government on serving destinations further east than Cyprus, as such routes were considered the preserve of BEA's rival, British Overseas Airways Corporation (BOAC), although both BEA and BOAC were state-owned airlines at the time. With its control of Cyprus Airways, BEA was able to serve key destinations in the Middle East, including Beirut and Cairo, using Cyprus Airways, whilst maintaining the pretence of not flying beyond Cyprus. Paradoxically, it was continuing disputes between BEA and BOAC over this issue that led to the first proposals in 1953 to merge BEA and BOAC to form British Airways.

In 1952, BEA took over the Cyprus Airways service to London with an Airspeed Ambassador, which featured a pressurized cabin that allowed nonstop routing avoiding a stopover in Athens. On 18 April 1953, BEA began using its newly delivered Vickers Viscount 701 on their scheduled service from London to Rome and Athens. The continuing sector from Athens to Nicosia was operated by BEA under charter to Cyprus Airways. This route from London to Nicosia was the world's first regular turboprop service.

In 1956, contemplating expansion of its routes, Cyprus Airways ordered two Vickers Viscount 756 aircraft that would be named St Hilarion (registration G-APCD) and Buffavento (G-APCE), but sold them before receiving them because of the deteriorating political situation in Cyprus. It also decided to sell all the Douglas DC-3 and Auster aircraft in September 1957 and entered into a five-year agreement with BEA for the latter to operate services on behalf of Cyprus Airways. As a result, BEA took over the operation of all Cyprus Airways services from 26 January 1958.

=== Independence in 1960 ===
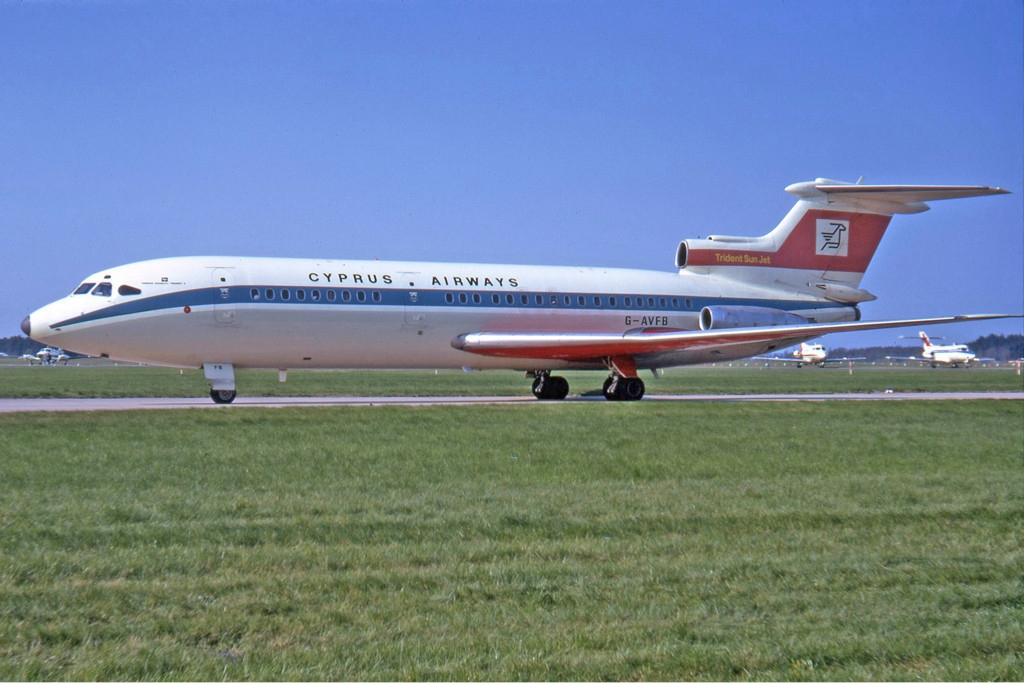
Hawker Siddeley Trident

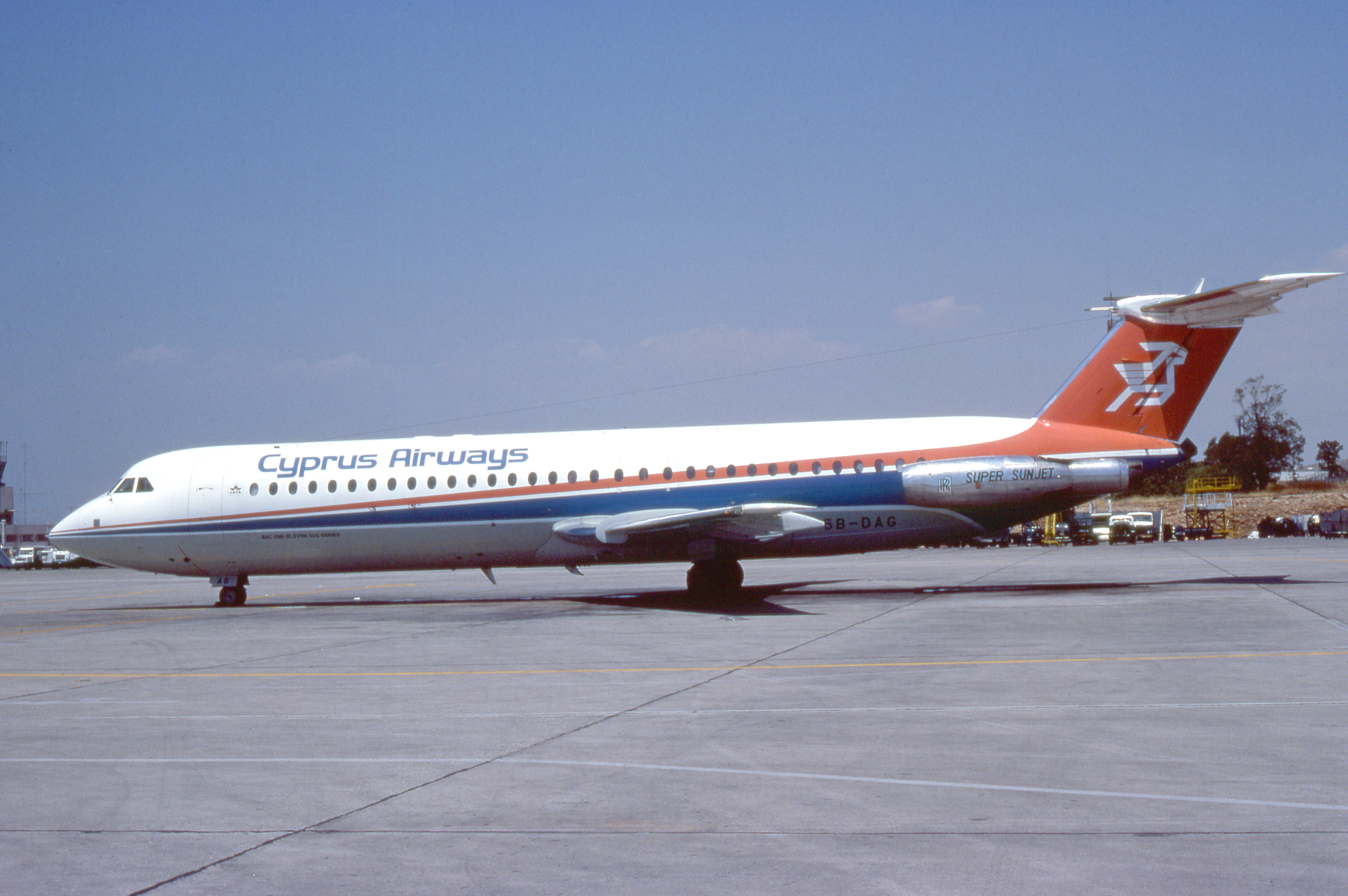
BAC 1-11

The government of newly independent Cyprus became the majority shareholder in 1960 with a 53.2 percent holding, while BEA's stake was reduced to 22.7 percent and private individuals held the rest. Thereafter, Cypriot nationals began to be hired and trained for the flight crews, which had previously been made up of British expatriates from BEA. Cyprus Airways still relied on BEA for aircraft and backroom support. BEA began introducing Comet 4B jets on all routes in 1961 via a joint aircraft pool arrangement that included Greece's Olympic Airways.

On 5 April 1960, BEA introduced de Havilland Comet 4B aircraft on the Nicosia, Athens, Rome and London routes. With the introduction of the Comets, Cyprus Airways became the first airline in the Middle East to have jet airplanes. The Comets flew in the BEA livery, but had the Cyprus Airways logo and title above their doors.

In 1965, Cyprus Airways began leasing its own Viscounts from BEA for regional routes. The Comet and Viscount aircraft were replaced with five Trident jets, three of them acquired from BEA. The first Hawker Siddeley Trident jet was introduced in November 1969. Cyprus also leased a BAC 1-11. The faster planes allowed more European trade centres (Frankfurt, Manchester, Brussels, and Paris) to be added to the timetable.

=== 1974 ===
At the start of the Turkish invasion of Cyprus on July 20, 1974, the attack on Nicosia airport caught all five of Cyprus Airways aircraft on the ground. Of the four Tridents parked at Nicosia International Airport one was destroyed by Turkish Air Force rocket fire (and wreckage of the tail is still there) and one was damaged by small arms fire remaining in the same position it was in that day of 1974. The two other Tridents were only lightly damaged by small arms fire and were flown out by British Airways engineers to the United Kingdom in 1977. The team from British Airways was assisted by a British Army team from the UN Peace Keeping (UNFICYP) REME Workshop based in Nicosia.

They used their 6x6 Leyland Recovery vehicle to remove the tail section of one of the destroyed planes and to lift the repaired engines into place. When the Tridents flew out (the Turks would not give permission for test flights, once they took off they were not allowed to return) they were the first planes to use the runway since U Thant flew in and out on a UN flight. One of these aircraft is at the Imperial War Museum Duxford, England, although it was repainted its original BEA livery. Also flown out was the company's BAC1-11 which was claimed by the insurers of the lessor, Court-Line, which had gone bankrupt. That aircraft returned to Cyprus Airways in 1978 and stayed with the company until 1995.

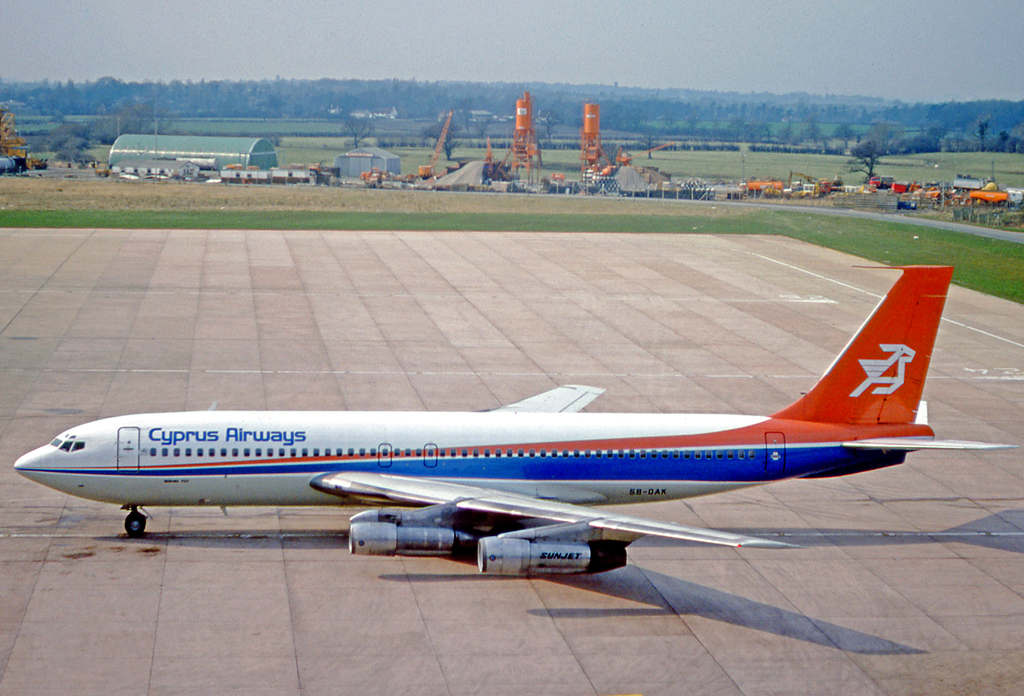
Boeing 707-123B of Cyprus Airways at Manchester Airport in 1979

All of the flight operations had to be suspended because Nicosia International Airport, the only airport of the island, had to be closed. Although the Turkish troops did not seize it, the cease-fire line was close enough to it to suggest that would not be reopened. The government of Cyprus then moved quickly to build a small terminal by a runway in Larnaca and Cyprus Airways restarted limited operations from there on February 8, 1975. Specifically, the airline leased from British Midland Airways Viscount turboprops to fly a stripped down route network to a few key cities in the region: Beirut, Tel Aviv, and Athens via Heraklion, with connections to London on British Airways. Cyprus Airways leased a pair of DC-9 jets in August 1975 to resume its own flights to London (via Salonika).

The acquisition of a DC-8 several months later allowed non-stop services. Cyprus also added flights to Saudi Arabia at this time. The company was soon able to order a pair of new BAC 1-11s, added to the sister aircraft already in the fleet. The economic loss of the Turkish invasion to the airline was estimated to be 1.6 million Cypriot pounds. To survive, the airline decided to reduce the salaries of all its employees to a minimum, who accepted it. The airline ordered still more different aircraft types in the late 1970s which replaced some earlier aircraft coming off lease.

=== Expansion in the 1980s ===
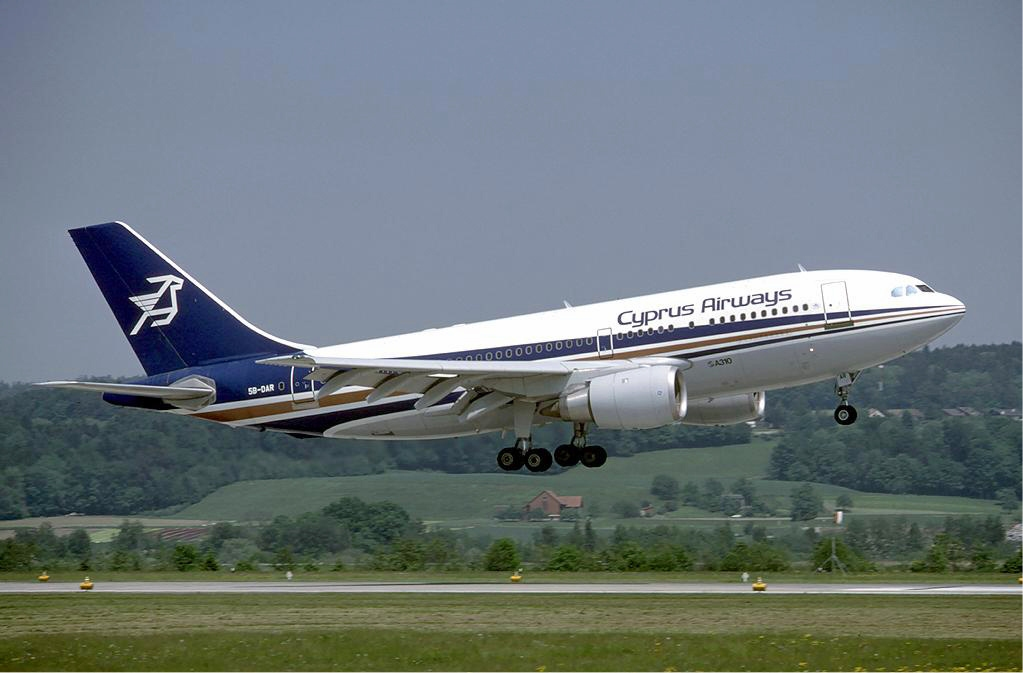
Airbus A310 at Zurich Airport in 1985

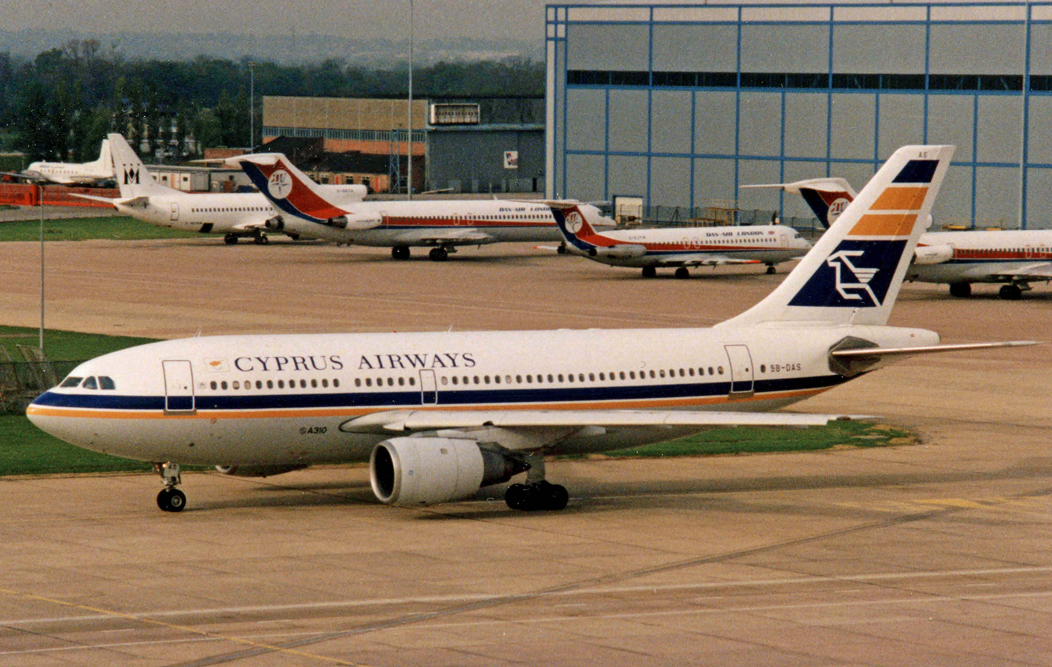
Airbus A310 departing from Manchester Airport in 1991

By 1981, Cyprus's fleet included four Boeing 707-123B (1979–1989) and three BAC One-Eleven 500. The route network again extended from Manchester, England, to Baghdad. A change in ownership structure had taken place, with British Airways selling all but 5 percent of the shares it had inherited from BEA to the Cypriot government. Private investors owned the remainder (24.14 percent).

Cyprus made a transition to Airbus aircraft over the course of the decade. Its first A310 wide-bodies arrived in 1984, followed by A320s in 1989. The order for the eight A320s was worth more than DEM 250 million.

Cyprus Airways was one of the first airlines to operate the Airbus A310, the eighth airline in the world to receive the Airbus A320, and the first airline that launched the IAE V2500 engine along with Adria Airways.

Profits reached record levels in the mid-1980s as the airline added service from new UK cities (Cardiff, Newcastle, and Glasgow). Income of CYP 4.8 million (DEM 8 million) in 1983, a record, would be tripled three years later. By this time, the airline was carrying 740,000 passengers a year.

=== 1990s ===
British Airways divested the last of its shares in 1991, leaving the government with an 80.46 percent stake and private investors, the remainder. The airline was flying high, introducing a livery and uniforms as the Airbuses plied new routes to Berlin and Helsinki. Cyprus Airways had also joined the SABRE international computer reservations system and set up a tour operation in the United Kingdom.

In 1992, the group established Eurocypria Airlines Ltd. to fly European tourists to Cyprus on a charter basis. It was expanding into ancillary services as well, taking over duty-free operations at Larnaca and Pafos airports.

Cyprus added many new cooperation agreements with other airlines as it developed its international reach by linking Europe and the Middle East. Its partners included KLM and Saudia. By the mid 1990s, more than one million passengers were flying Cyprus Airways every year; another 4,000 chose the charter operation Eurocypria. The airline's market share approached 40 percent. After a rough couple of years, the company posted a CYP 13 million profit in 1994 thanks to cost-cutting and marketing efforts.

=== New millennium ===
The airline introduced a restyled livery, as it embarked on an ambitious fleet renewal programme. Two new Airbus A319s, smaller than its other aircraft, were added in 2002. The next year, two new Airbus A330s replaced the older A310s on long-haul routes. A fleet of four Boeing 737s was chosen for the Eurocypria charter subsidiary, however, with two further similar aircraft added in 2004 and 2005. A feature of the new Eurocypria aircraft was that each had a different colour on its tail. In the meantime, the A320s owned by Cyprus Airways but leased to Eurocypria were returned to the parent company.

In 2002, the Cypriot government lowered its ownership stake to 69.62 percent.

Cyprus Airways founded Hellas Jet in Athens (Greece) in 2003, never making a profit. It held a 75% share of that carrier until all of the shares were sold to Air Miles (charter broker) Air Miles in 2005.

In 2006, the government of Cyprus bought Eurocypria because Cyprus Airways started facing severe financial problems.

According to the airline's 2010 financial results, the operating loss for 2010 was €4,9 million in comparison to a loss of €5,4 million in 2009. On 28 June 2011, Cyprus Airways issued a profits warning to the Cyprus Stock Exchange, attributing this to "the continuing financial crisis and to the further significant increase in fuel prices." On 31 August 2011, Cyprus Airways issued its results for the first half of 2011, which showed a loss of €29.3 million, compared to a loss of €25.5 million for the respective period in 2010, representing an increase of €3.8 million.

As a result of a restructuring programme to curb the continued losses, most Middle East destinations were cut from the timetable in 2011 and 2012, including Bahrain, Cairo, Damascus, Dubai and Jeddah.

=== Final years and closure ===
In February 2012, due to the poor financial results of the airline, the Cypriot government announced it would increase the airline's capital and authorized negotiations for the sale of an unspecified stake of the carrier. As of September 2014, the Cypriot government owned 93.67% of the airline. raised the share capital of the company and sold the state-owned majority of shares. Negotiations were developing with Aeroflot, which was expected to buy the company if an agreement is reached with the Cypriot government. In May 2012, Cyprus Airways announced that interest was expressed by Triple Five Group, the first official announcement concerning a bidder for the sale of the company. On 23 July 2012, the Cyprus Stock Exchange suspended dealing in Cyprus Airways shares, due to the delay by Cyprus Airways in submitting and publishing its annual financial statements for the year ended 31 December 2011. A statement to the Cyprus Stock Exchange on 4 March 2013 gave the results for Cyprus Airways Group for the year ended 31 December 2012 as a loss after tax of €55,8 million in comparison to a loss of €23,9 million in 2011. The European Commission announced on 6 March 2013 that it has opened an investigation into whether the Cypriot government's €73 million rescue loan in December 2012 and €31.3 million contribution to a capital increase in January 2013 are in breach of EU rules on state aid.

On 13 March 2014, Cyprus Airways confirmed the sale of its second slot at London Heathrow Airport to the Lebanese company Middle East Airlines for €6.3 million.

The airline ceased operations on 9 January 2015 following a policy made by the European Commission that the state aid paid to the airline by the Government of Cyprus was illegal and had to be returned by the company. This effectively caused Cyprus Airways to be bankrupt. Notably, air connectivity rose by 15 per cent in the first six months of 2016 compared with an increase of 3.6 per cent in 2015, the year when Cyprus Airways went into bankruptcy.

=== Restart of operations ===
In July 2016, the Cypriot government announced that the Cypriot start-up company Charlie Airlines Ltd. was the winning bidder in a competition carried out by the finance ministry about the use of the Cyprus Airways brand for a period of ten years. Charlie Airlines was built by a consortium of local investors that hold 60% of the airline and Russia's S7 Airlines, that holds 40% as a joint-venture. S7 is currently Russia's largest domestic carrier and transported 10.6 million passengers in 2015. S7 CEO Vladislav Filev said that the Charlie name was inspired by the nickname handed to expatriated Cypriots that had left the island. S7 will provide two Airbus A319-100 aircraft to start operations to destinations in the UK, Greece and Russia. Charlie Airlines Ltd filed an application to receive a local Air operator's certificate and acquire the right to use the Cyprus Airways trademarks for ten years for 2 million euros.

== Corporate affairs ==
=== Ownership ===
Cyprus Airways Public Ltd was predominantly owned by the government of Cyprus, with 391,155,177 shares issued and fully paid:

| Shareholder | Interest |
|---|---|
| Government of the Republic of Cyprus | 93.67% |
| Private investors | 6.33% |
| Total | 100.00% |

=== Business trends ===
The key trends for Cyprus Airways are shown below (as at years ending 31 December). Full annual reports and accounts were issued up until 2007, but as the airline's financial position deteriorated, so the annual accounts became briefer. The 2012 figures are only from press reports, and are unaudited.

| | 2005 | 2006 | 2007 | 2008 | 2009 | 2010 | 2011 | 2012* |
|---|---|---|---|---|---|---|---|---|
| Turnover (€m) | 206.5 | 209.8 | 288.5 | 311.4 | 247.5 | 236.4 | 212.9 | 175.5 |
| Profits (EBT) (€m) | −24.5 | −16.6 | 2.5 | 2.1 | −3.2 | 0.4 | −23.6 | −55.8* |
| Number of employees (at year end) | 1,538 | 1,131 | 1,354 | 1,197 | 1,226 | | | n/a |
| Number of passengers (m) | 1.6 | 1.6 | 1.7 | 1.7 | 1.6 | | 1.3 | 1.3 |
| Passenger load factor (%) | 71.2 | 73.0 | 72.2 | 71.6 | 70.2 | | 71.3 | 71.1 |
| Number of aircraft (at year end/*average) | 10 | 10 | 11 | 12 | 11* | | 12 | 9 |
| Notes/sources | | | | | | | | |

*Unaudited figures; loss shown is after tax.

== Destinations ==
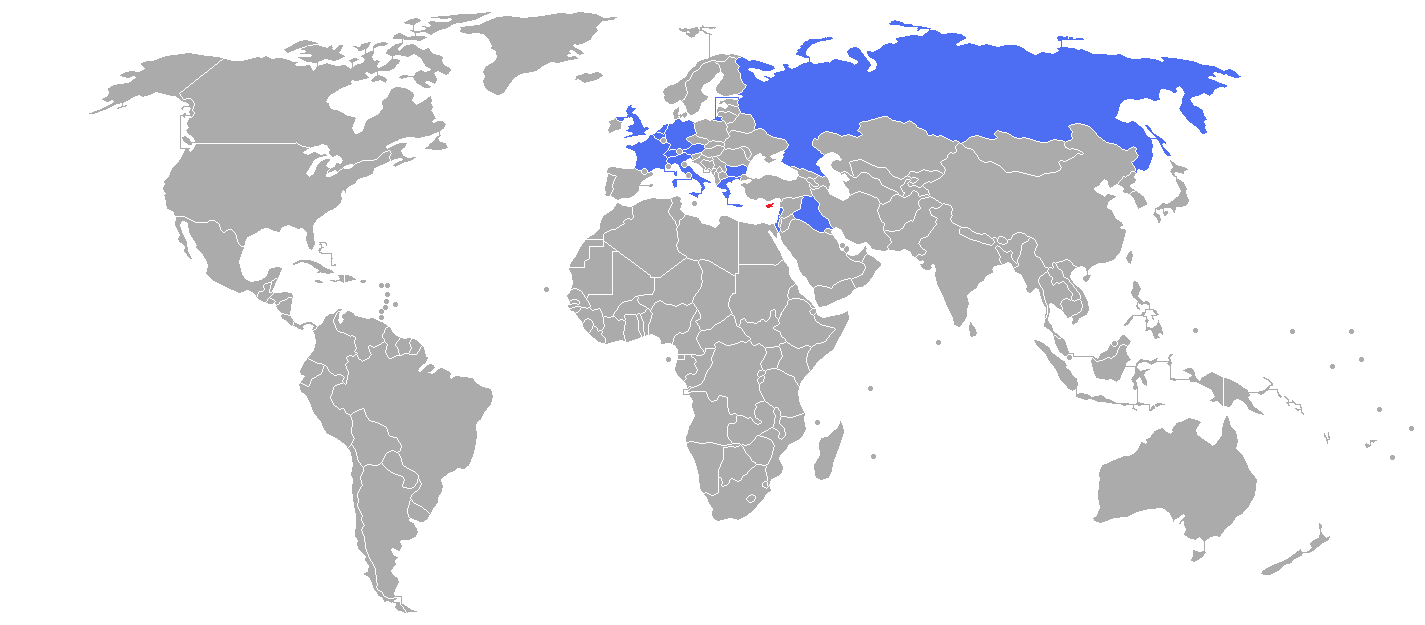
Cyprus Airways destinations in 2012

As of April 2014, Cyprus Airways served 12-year-round destinations in 10 countries, all in Europe and the Middle East.

=== Codeshare agreements ===
As of February 2014, Cyprus Airways had codeshare agreements with the following airlines:

- Aeroflot
- Air France
- Alitalia
- Bulgaria Air
- Etihad Airways
- Gulf Air
- KLM
- Middle East Airlines
- TAROM
- Virgin Atlantic

On 25 July 2011, Cyprus Airways signed a code-share agreement with Virgin Atlantic, allowing the Cypriot market to travel to Boston, New York, Newark, Los Angeles, Manchester, Edinburgh and Aberdeen on flights operated by Virgin using both Virgin and Cyprus Airways flight numbers, with connecting flights at London–Heathrow. Services from London Heathrow to Larnaca were operated by Cyprus Airways aircraft with flight numbers both of Cyprus Airways and Virgin Atlantic.

== Fleet ==
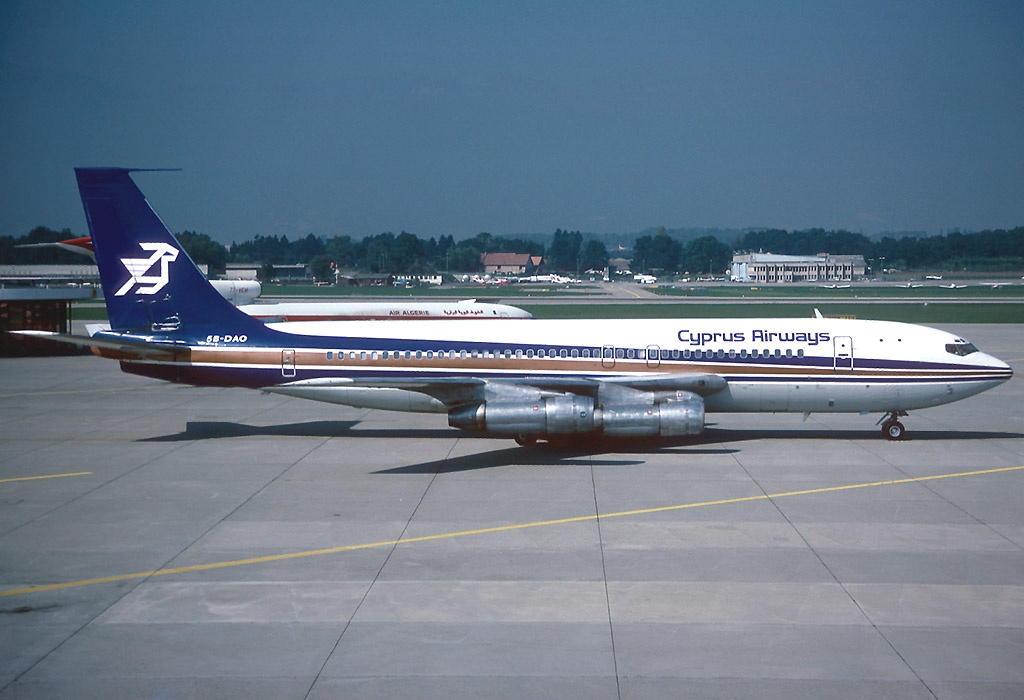
Boeing 707-123B

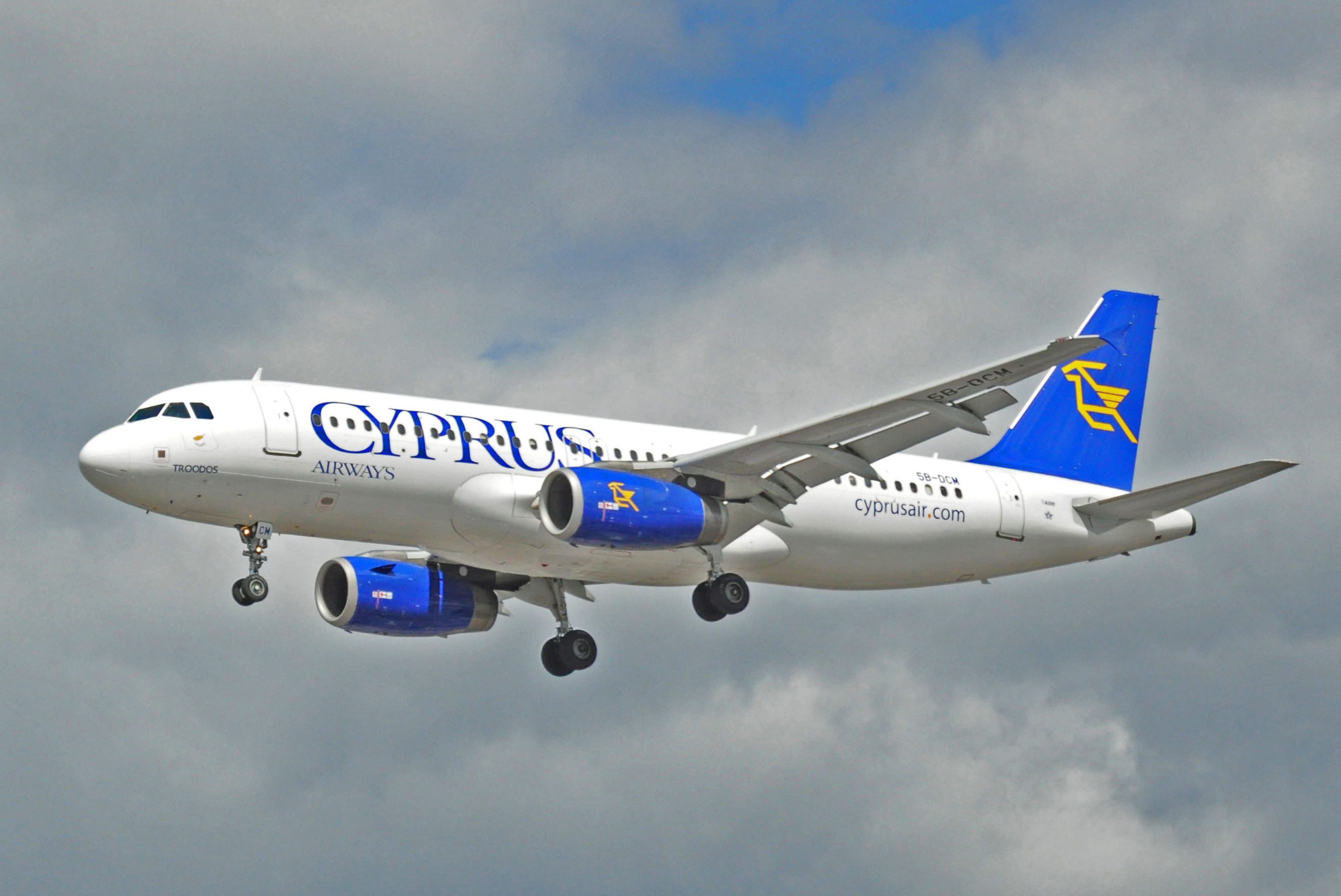
Airbus A320

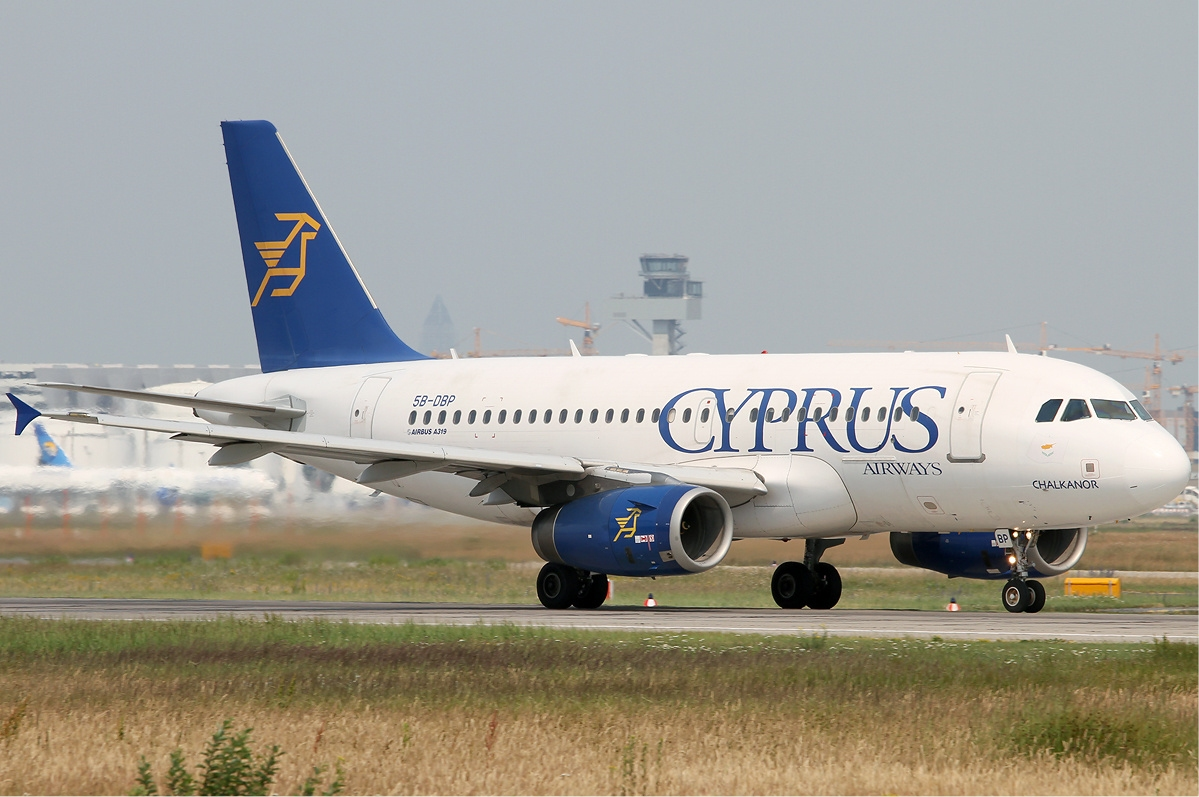
Airbus A319 taxiing at Frankfurt Airport in 2010

Prior to the airline's shutdown, Cyprus Airways had a fleet of two Airbus A320 and one A330 aircraft averaging 11.3 years. All aircraft bore names of Cypriot landmarks and cities. . Cyprus Airways operated also all the following aircraft types:

Cyprus Airways fleet
| Aircraft | Introduced | Retired |
|---|---|---|
| Airbus A310-200 | 1984 | 2003 |
| Airbus A319-100 | 2002 | 2013 |
| Airbus A320-200 | 1989 | 2015 |
| Airbus A321-200 | 2012 | 2013 |
| Airbus A330-200 | 2002 | 2012 |
| Airspeed Oxford | 1953 | 1955 |
| Airspeed Ambassador | ? | ? |
| Auster Alpine | ? | ? |
| BAC One-Eleven 500 | 1974 | 1995 |
| Boeing 707-123B | 1979 | 1989 |
| Boeing 720 | 1976 | 1979 |
| Bristol Britannia | ? | ? |
| Canadair CL44 D4-1 Freighter | ? | ? |
| De Havilland Comet | ? | ? |
| Douglas DC-3 Dakota | 1947 | 1957 |
| Douglas DC-6B Freighter | ? | ? |
| Douglas DC-8-51 | 1979 | 1979 |
| Douglas DC-8-52 | 1976 | 1978 |
| McDonnell Douglas DC-9-15 | 1975 | 1976 |
| Hawker Siddeley Trident 1E | 1972 | 1974 |
| Hawker Siddeley Trident 2E | 1969 | 1974 |
| Vickers Viscount 806 | ? | ? |

=== Livery ===
The airline's livery was an all white fuselage with the words 'CYPRUS AIRWAYS' in blue over the front passenger windows. The vertical stabilizer was blue, with yellow lines depicting a galloping Cypriot mouflon, a type of wild sheep only found in Cyprus. This logo was also painted on the engines of the aircraft. The galloping mouflon logo was designed in 1962 by David Collins on the instruction of BEA. The first aircraft to display the mouflon design were De Havilland Comet 4B aircraft by the passenger door entrance.

=== Catering ===
Food and beverages served on flights from Cyprus were provided by Cyprus Airways Catering facilities in Larnaca. Meals were selected from an array of international and Cypriot foods.

=== In-flight entertainment ===
In-flight entertainment was introduced by Cyprus Airways on its Airbus A319 aircraft upon delivery in 2002, and its A320s were retrofitted at the same time.

On the A320 family aircraft, there were television screens placed along the aircraft. Sound was provided through headsets given by the cabin crew. Screens had a moving-map system which provided real-time flight information such as position and direction of the plane, altitude, airspeed, distance to destination, distance from origination, and local time.

The larger A330 aircraft operated between 2002 and 2011 and used mainly on medium and longer flights to London Heathrow, Paris, and Amsterdam, but also occasionally to Manchester, Athens, and Zurich, had individual screens for each passenger, mounted on the back of the seats, offering many more options in video and audio entertainment.

=== Business class ===
Business class was named after the ancient Greek god Apollo, who was a symbol of harmony, order, and reason. Apollo Class had wide leather seats that reclined by up to 45 inches (110 cm) of pitch and featured electrical recline and leg rest. Apollo Class passengers also had access to the Sunjet executive lounges at both Larnaca and Paphos airports.

Apollo Class included a personal entertainment system, built into the armrest of the high-standard seats. Additionally, meals were served to business class passengers, with a selection of international and Cypriot cuisine on offer. Drinks and wine were offered on all flights.

=== Economy class ===
Economy class was named after the ancient Greek goddess Aphrodite, who, according to Greek mythology, was a symbol of beauty and elegance. Cyprus Airways' Aphrodite Class offered a seat pitch of 30-31 inches.

Depending on the destination and time of the flight, a hot breakfast, lunch, or cold snack was served. The tray included a seasonal salad and dessert, as well as crackers and halloumi cheese. Drinks, including coffee or tea and soft drinks, were offered.

=== SunMiles ===
SunMiles was the frequent flyer programme of Cyprus Airways. There were four tiers of membership: Student, Regular, Premier, and Elite. Points were credited per each one-way flight on Cyprus Airways. Economy class passengers gained 1 point per kilometer, and Business class passengers gained 1.5 points per kilometer.

=== Awards ===
Cyprus Airways was awarded the 'Commitment to Excellence in Europe' award by the European Foundation of Quality Management (EFQM) in 2007.

Cyprus Airways was also awarded the 'IATA Best In-flight Programming for a European airline' award.

== Incidents and accidents ==
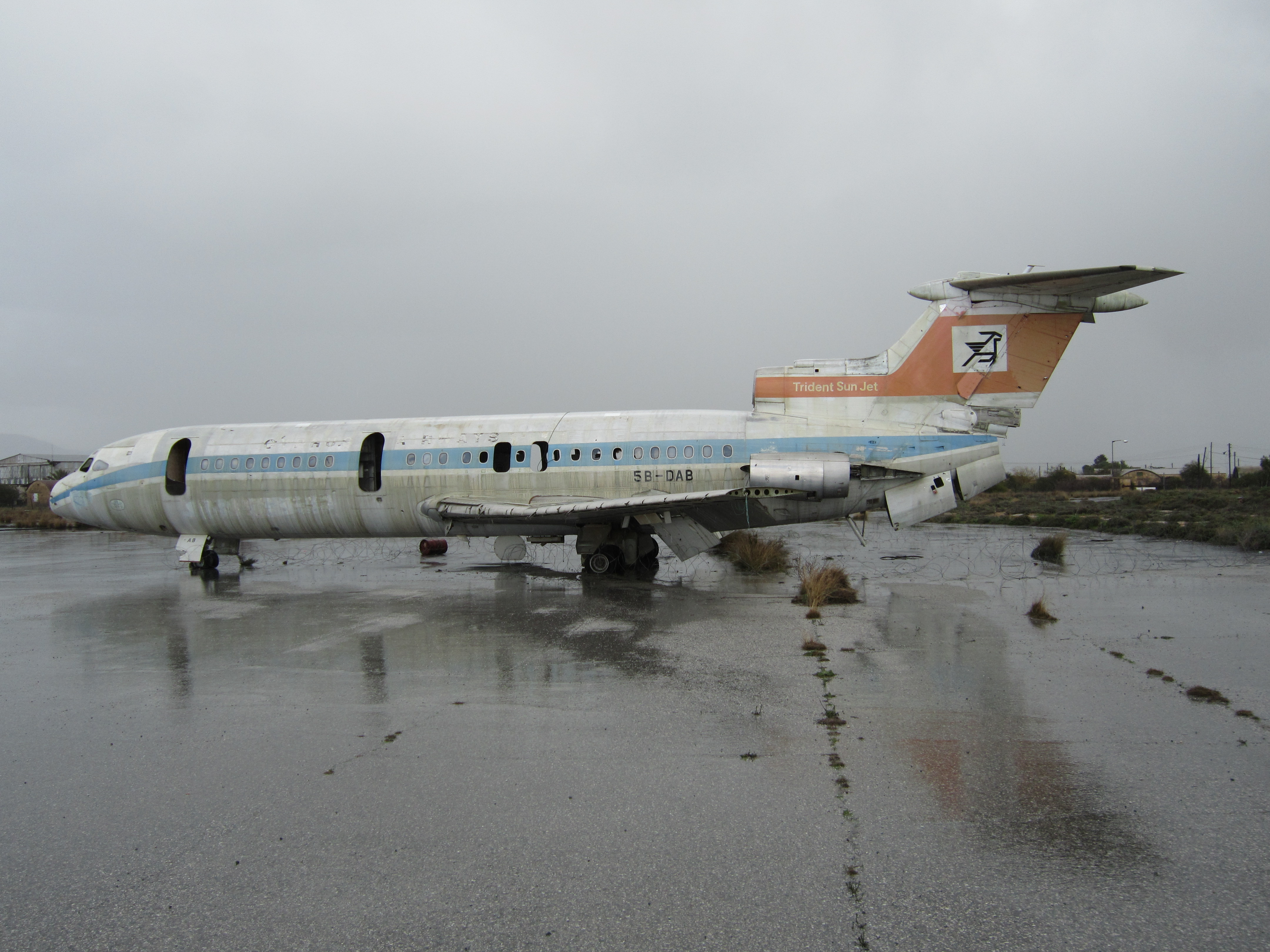
Remains of a Hawker Siddeley Trident abandoned at Nicosia Airport since the Turkish invasion of Cyprus in 1974

- On 21 December 1961, British European Airways Flight 226, a De Havilland Comet 4B, owned and operated by British European Airways (BEA) on behalf of Cyprus Airways, crashed immediately after takeoff from Ankara. The probable cause was instrument failure. Seven of the 34 people on board survived. The four cabin crew were Cyprus Airways employees.
- On 12 October 1967, Cyprus Airways Flight 284 broke up in midair on a flight between Athens and Nicosia, most likely as a result of the detonation of an explosive device. All 66 people on board died. Similar to the 1961 accident, the De Havilland Comet 4B aircraft was owned and operated by British European Airways (BEA), though cabin staff were Cyprus Airways employees.
