= Alpena =

Alpena may refer to:

== Places in the United States ==
=== Michigan ===
- Alpena, Michigan, the sole city in, and the county seat of Alpena County
- Alpena County, Michigan, a county in the state of Michigan
  - Alpena County Regional Airport, county-owned public-use airport
- Alpena Township, Michigan, a township located in Alpena County, surrounding the city

=== Other states ===
- Alpena, Arkansas, a town located in Boone County, Arkansas
- Alpena, South Dakota, a town located in Jerauld County, South Dakota
- Alpena, West Virginia, an unincorporated community in Randolph County, West Virginia

== Education ==
- Alpena Community College, Alpena, Michigan
- Alpena Public Schools, a school district in Alpena and Presque Isle Counties, Michigan
  - Alpena High School (Michigan), the district high school

== Other uses ==
- PS Alpena, a sidewheel steamer which sank in Lake Michigan in 1880
- SS Alpena, a lake freighter launched in 1942 and currently in service
- Alpena (automobile), an American car manufactured from 1910 to 1914

== See also ==
- Alpen (disambiguation)
