= Alpine (plantation) =

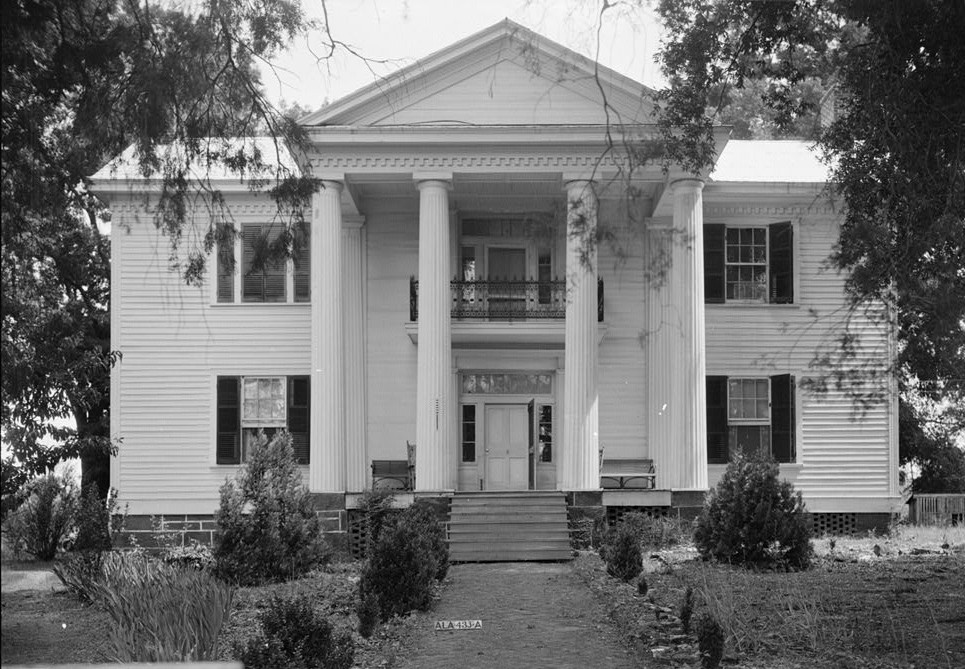
- Main house at Alpine Plantation in 1937

- Location within Alabama
- 33.35113°N 86.23722°W
- Location: Alpine, Alabama, US

History
- Built: 1858

Site notes
- Architectural style: Greek Revival
- Governing body: Private

Alabama Register of Landmarks and Heritage
- Designated: October 25, 2018

Alpine is a historic plantation house in Alpine, Talladega County, Alabama, United States. Completed in 1858, the two-story Greek Revival-style house was built for Nathaniel Welch by a master builder, Almarion Devalco Bell. The wood-frame house has several unusual features that make it one of the more architecturally interesting antebellum houses in the state. These features include the foundation materials, interior floor-plan, and the window fenestration.

== History ==
Nathaniel Welch was born in Madison County, Virginia on November 24, 1814, the son of the Reverend Oliver Welch, a Baptist minister. Oliver Welch was a founder of the Alpine Baptist Church. He built the simple two-story hewn-log house at his homestead nearby, known as Kingston, upon his arrival from Virginia in 1832. The Welch family was intermarried with the Reynolds family, of the now-destroyed Mount Ida nearby.

Over time, a town grew up around the plantation when a railroad came through. Initially known as Welchs Depot, it eventually came to be known as Alpine, in honor of the plantation. The plantation remained in the Welch family until 1970.

== Architecture ==
Approached via a 1/4 mi (0.4 km) long avenue of mature oak trees, the house sits upon the crest of a hillock. Conceived from the beginning as a Greek Revival-style house, the two-story structure is fronted by a monumental Doric tetrastyle portico, supporting a pediment over the central bay of the 60-foot (18 m) wide three-bay front facade. The portico shelters the main front entrance in addition to a second story balcony with an intricate cast iron balustrade and matching upper doorway. The relatively simple 6-over-6 lite front windows, in addition to the doors on the first and second levels, are all flanked by sidelights, creating an unusual three-part window arrangement.

Two other unusual features for an early house in Alabama are the maximum 4-foot (1.2 m) tall cut stone foundations and a brick-lined dining room measuring 20 by 40 feet (6.1 m × 12.2 m) on the basement level. It was designed as a refuge from the state's hot and humid summer weather. Interior stone stairs rise from the cellar room to the ground floor. The rear left side of the house has a one-story attached ell wing, originally used as a domestic wing. When the house was inventoried by the Historic American Buildings Survey in 1937, the grounds contained a detached wood-frame kitchen building, with a build-date contemporaneous with that of the main house, a smokehouse, and a storehouse. The storehouse was demolished in 1970 and the timber reused to build a modern carport.

== See also ==
- List of plantations in Alabama
