= Alpin =

Alpin may refer to:

- Alpín mac Echdach, two kings of the same name - one the father of Cináed mac Ailpín, the other a king of Dál Riata
- Siol Alpin, a group of seven related Scottish Clans
- House of Alpin, a dynasty of Scottish kings
- King Alpín I of the Picts
- King Alpín II of the Picts
- Metro Alpin, the highest subway in the world in Saas Fee, Switzerland
- Alpin (supplement), a weekly supplement of Prothom Alo, a Bangladeshi newspaper
- Kimfly Alpin, a Slovenian paraglider design

== See also ==
- Alpine (disambiguation)
