= Auster Aiglet Trainer =

1950s British light aircraft

J/5 Aiglet Trainer
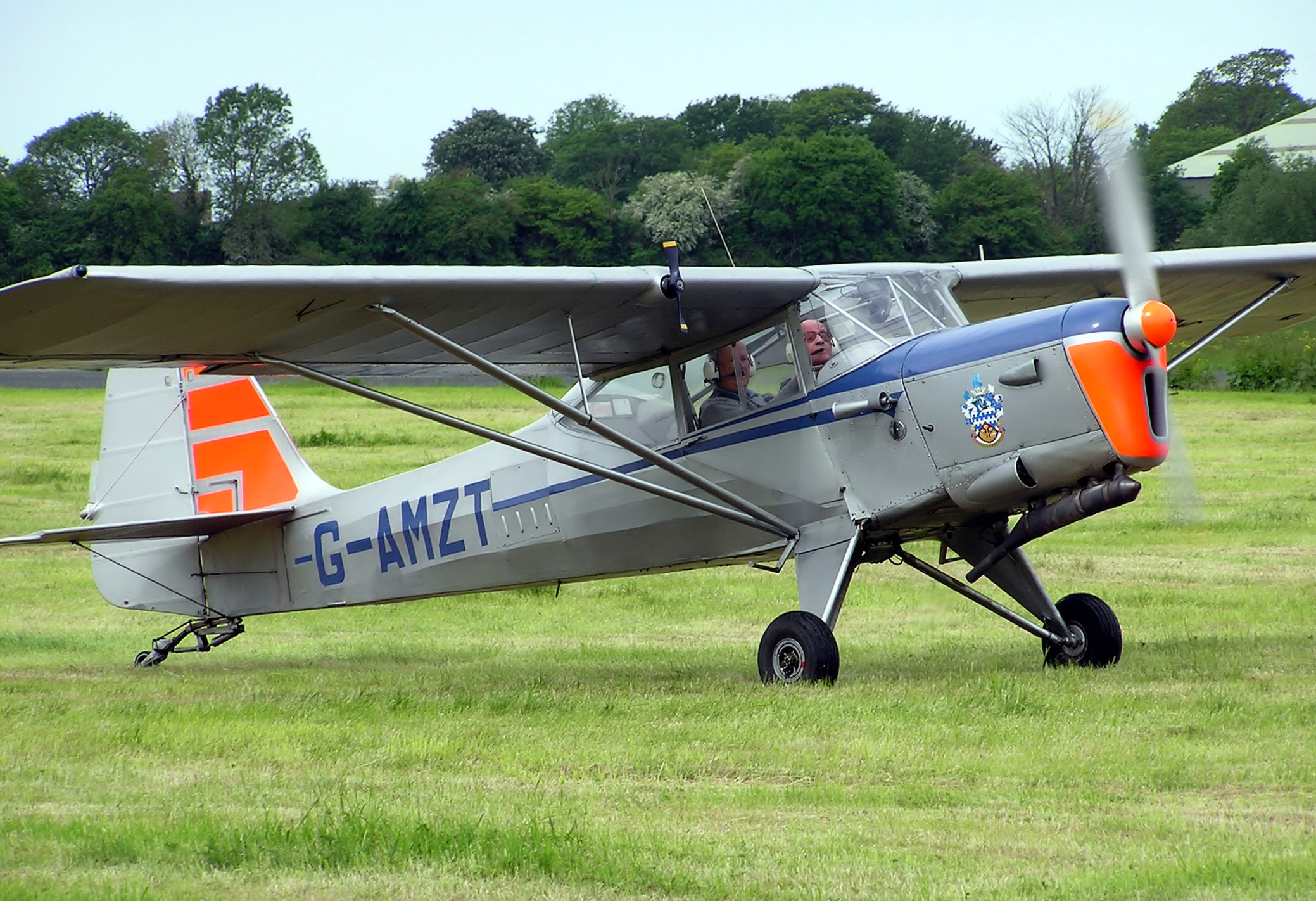

General information
- Type: Aerobatic trainer/tourer
- Manufacturer: Auster Aircraft Limited
- Primary users: private pilot owners Pakistan Air Force
- Number built: 77

History
- Manufactured: 1951-1958
- First flight: 1951
- Developed from: Auster J/5 Autocar
- Variant: Auster J/5R Alpine

The Auster J/5 Aiglet Trainer was a 1950s British single-engined four-seat high-wing training and touring monoplane built by Auster Aircraft Limited at Rearsby, Leicestershire.

== History ==
Despite its name, the aircraft type had nothing to do with the Auster J/1B Aiglet, it being an aerobatic development of the Auster J/5 Autocar.

The Aiglet Trainer was based on the J/5 fuselage with new wings and stressed for aerobatics. The prototype first flew on 2 June 1951.

Most Aiglet Trainers were bought by private pilots and flying clubs, but 15 went to the Pakistan Air Force, 14 to the Iran Civil Aviation Club and two to the Lebanese Air Force.

== Variants ==
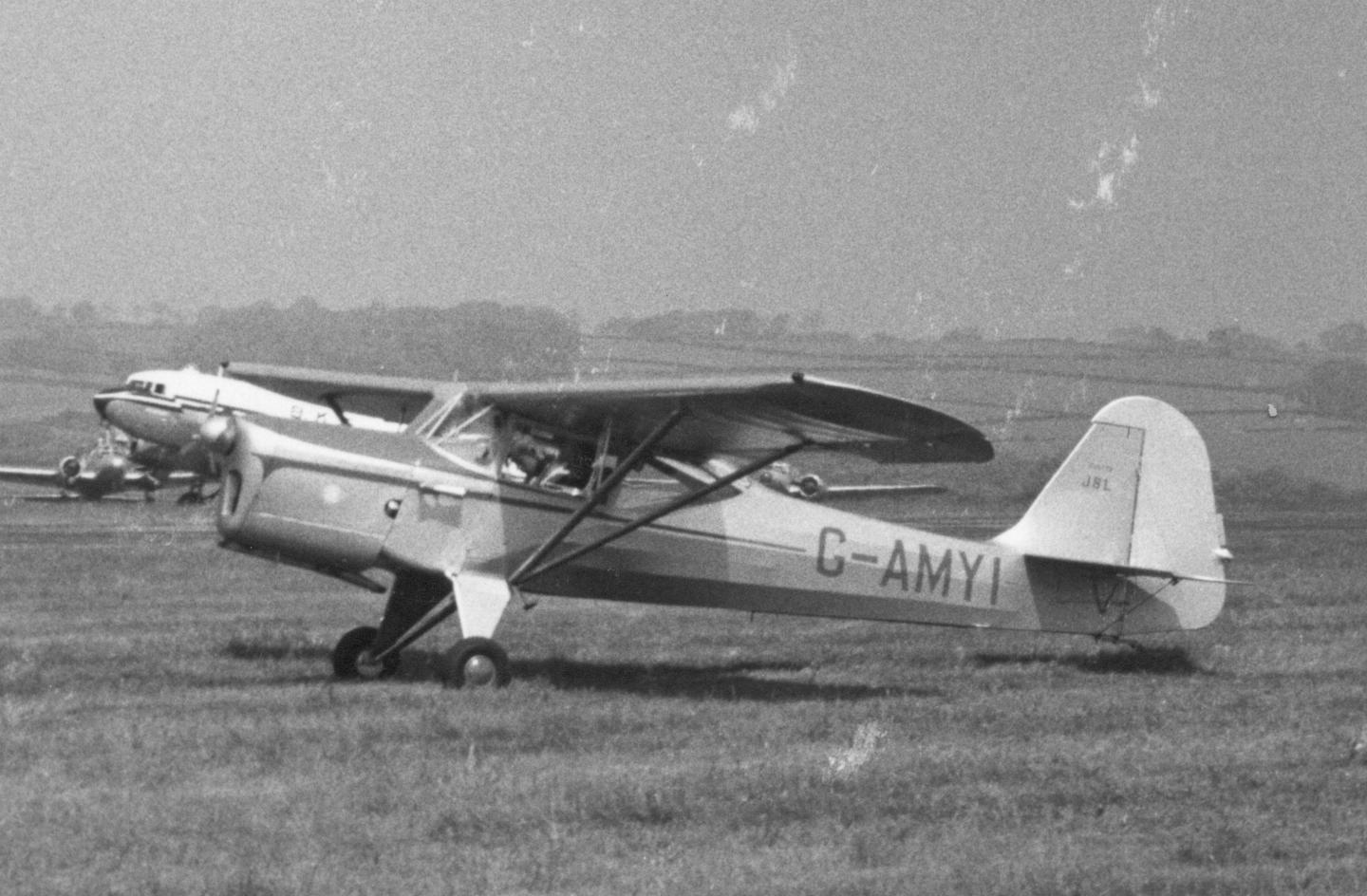
The sole J/8L Aiglet Trainer had an enlarged fin and rudder. Leeds (Yeadon) Airport May 1955

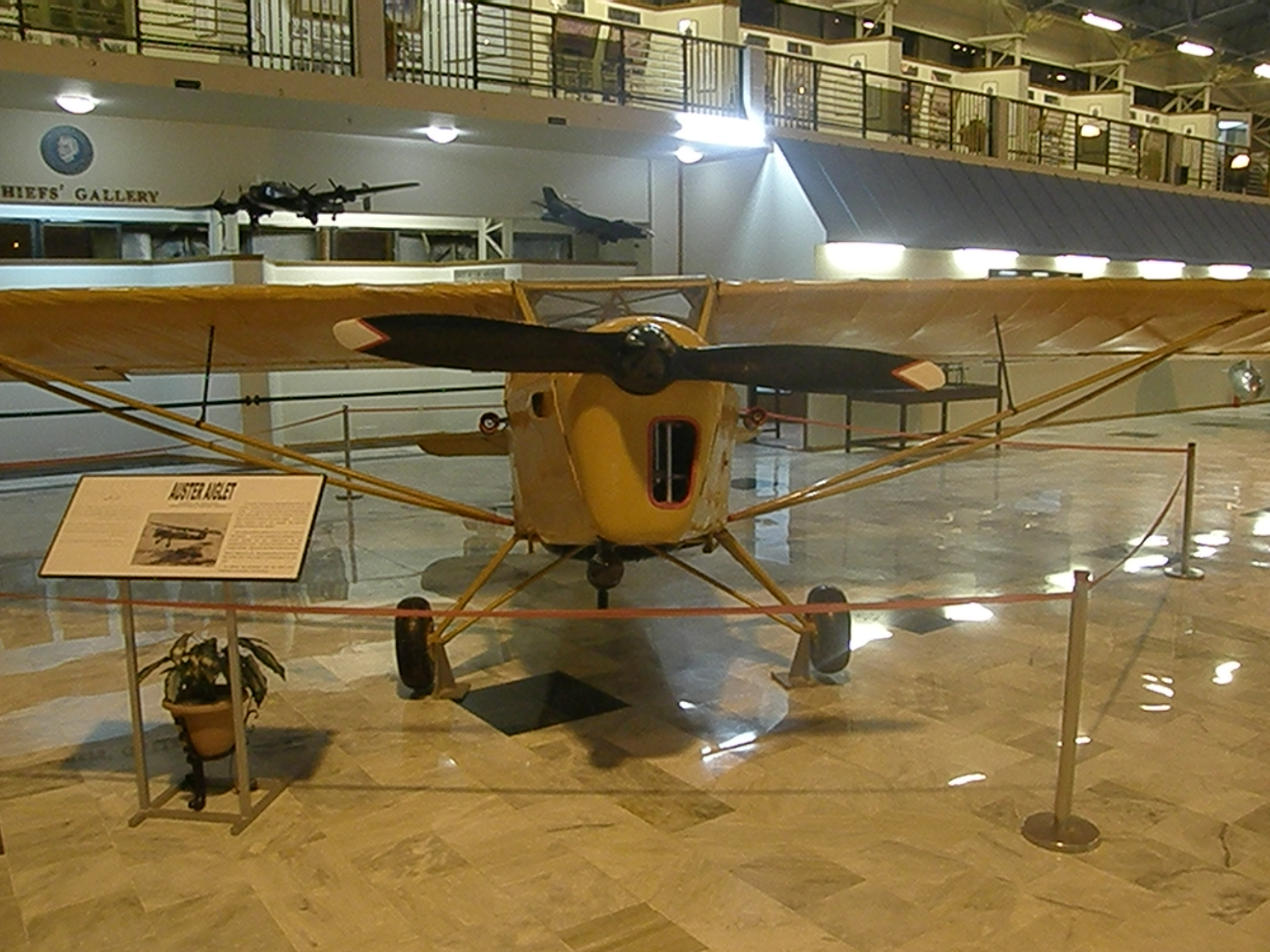
An Auster Aiglet retired from the Pakistan Air Force (PAF) on display at the PAF Museum, Karachi.

- Auster J/5F Aiglet Trainer – production version.
- Auster J/5K Aiglet Trainer – Blackburn Cirrus Major 3 engine, one built.
- Auster J/5L Aiglet Trainer – de Havilland Gipsy Major 1 engine. 10 built.
- Auster J/8L Aiglet Trainer – J-5K re-engined with a de Havilland Gipsy Major 1 engine.

== Operators ==
Jordan

- Royal Jordanian Air Force

Lebanon

- Lebanese Air Force – two aircraft

Pakistan

- Pakistan Air Force – 17 aircraft

== Specifications (J/5F) ==
Data from Jane's All The World's Aircraft 1955–56

General characteristics

- Crew: 2 or 3
- Length: 23 ft 2 1/2 in (7.074 m)
- Wingspan: 32 ft 0 in (9.75 m)
- Height: 8 ft 3 in (2.51 m)
- Wing area: 164 sq ft (15.2 m^{2})
- Empty weight: 1,323 lb (600 kg)
- Max takeoff weight: 2,200 lb (998 kg) (three seater)
- Powerplant: 1 × de Havilland Gipsy Major 1 4-cylinder inline engine, 130 hp (97 kW)

Performance

- Maximum speed: 127 mph (204 km/h, 110 kn)
- Cruise speed: 110 mph (180 km/h, 96 kn)
- Stall speed: 29 mph (47 km/h, 25 kn) full flaps, engine off
- Range: 275 mi (443 km, 239 nmi)
- Service ceiling: 12,500 ft (3,800 m)
- Rate of climb: 705 ft/min (3.58 m/s)
