= Alpen =

Alpen may refer to:

- Alps, mountain range in Europe
- Alpen, Alberta, Canada
- Alpen, Germany, a municipality in North Rhine-Westphalia, Germany
- Alpen (food), a British muesli and breakfast cereal brand

== See also ==
- Alpena (disambiguation)
- Alpens, province of Barcelona, Catalonia, Spain
