= Cyprus Airways Flight 284 =

1967 airliner bombing

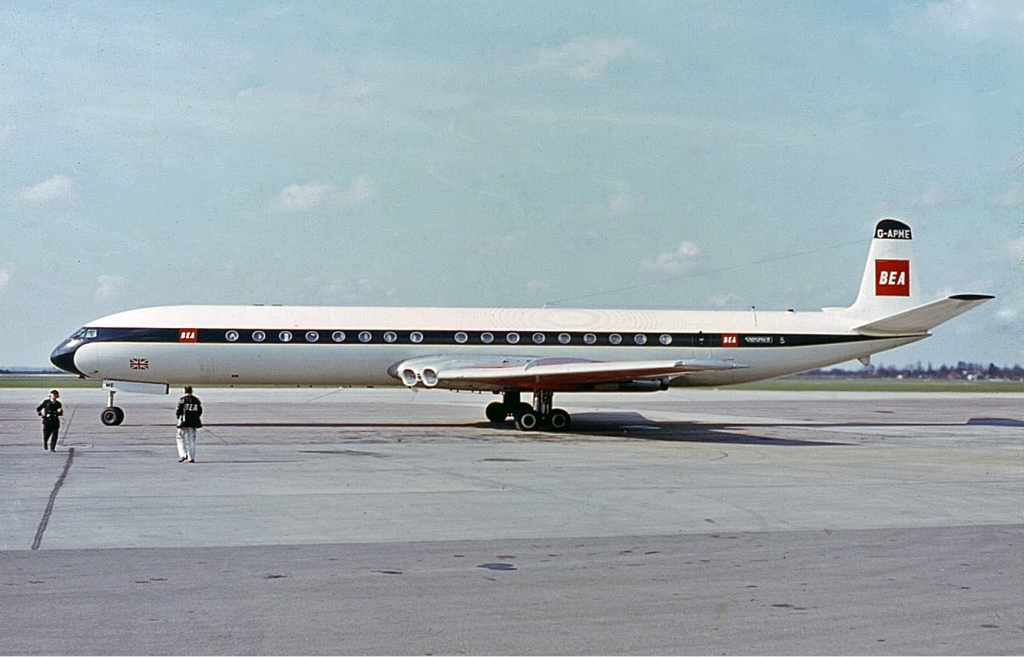
- A de Havilland DH.106 Comet 4B, similar to the crashed aircraft

Bombing
- Date: 12 October 1967
- Summary: Bombing, possibly attempted assassination
- Site: Mediterranean Sea

Aircraft
- Aircraft type: de Havilland DH.106 Comet 4B
- Operator: Cyprus Airways operated by British European Airways
- Registration: G-ARCO
- Flight origin: Ellinikon International Airport, Athens, Greece
- Destination: Nicosia International Airport, Nicosia, Cyprus
- Occupants: 66
- Passengers: 59
- Crew: 7
- Fatalities: 66
- Survivors: 0

Cyprus Airways Flight 284 was a de Havilland Comet that exploded during a flight to Nicosia International Airport on 12 October 1967 after a bomb was detonated in the cabin. The airliner crashed in the Mediterranean Sea and all 66 passengers and crew members on board were killed.

== Aircraft ==
The aircraft was a de Havilland DH.106 Comet 4B, registration G-ARCO, the 49th Comet 4 built. It had been owned and operated by British European Airways (BEA) since it was built in 1961.

== Flight ==
BEA was a shareholder in Cyprus Airways, and the two airlines had an agreement for all of Cyprus Airways' jet services to be operated by BEA Comets. The night before the crash, the aircraft departed from London Heathrow Airport to Ellinikon International Airport in Athens, Greece, arriving just after 3:00 a.m. local time (1:00 a.m. UTC) on 12 October. At about 4:30 a.m., the aircraft departed Athens on the regular Cyprus Airways flight to Nicosia with 59 passengers and a crew of seven on board.

About 45 minutes into the flight, control of the aircraft was transferred from air traffic controllers (ATC) at Athens to their counterparts in Nicosia. The crew contacted Nicosia's controllers by radio, but when ATC replied, no response was received from the aircraft.

As Flight 284 was flying toward Cyprus at approximately 29,000 feet (8,839 m), the aircraft exploded about 100 miles (161 km) southeast of the Greek island of Rhodes and about 22 miles (35 km) south of the Turkish coastal town of Demre.

The flight was scheduled to proceed to Cairo after stopping in Nicosia. Eight passengers were booked on a Middle East Airlines flight the next day.

== Aftermath and investigation ==
=== Recovery of remains and wreckage ===
Within a day of the crash, 51 bodies were recovered from the sea. Contrary to initial reports, none were wearing life jackets. Some were wearing wristwatches that had stopped at 5:25. Investigators concluded that the aircraft had suffered some form of damage during the initial radio call to Nicosia ATC at about 5:15 a.m. and had disintegrated in flight about eight minutes later. They estimated the aircraft's wreckage to be scattered on the seabed over an area of about 35 square miles (91 km^{2}) at a depth of 9,000–10,000 feet (2,743–3,048 m) below the surface.

After a drop tank was recovered from the sea, investigators hypothesised that the aircraft crashed following a mid-air collision with a military aircraft. However, searchers also found a cushion from one of the Comet's passenger seats floating on the surface of the sea, which was found to contain evidence of a military-grade plastic explosive. The mid-air collision theory was discarded and no attempt was undertaken to retrieve any submerged wreckage.

The seat cushion and other objects from the cabin were analysed by experts in forensic explosives at the UK's Royal Armament Research and Development Establishment, the first time that the institution performed such an analysis.

The most common theory is that the explosion was a result of an attempted assassination of EOKA leader and at the time, Supreme head of the defense of Cyprus, General Georgios Grivas. The British Home Office, however, has refused to declassify the findings of the investigation until 2067 which has in turn, increased peoples suspicions about the events of the bombing. In 2023, however, Metropolitan Police admitted that there were lapses and flaws in their investigation and further stated that there were also political implications which could have harmed relations between Cyprus and the United Kingdom.

== Memorial ==
A service of commemoration was held on 12 October 2022, the 55th anniversary of the crash. With permission from British Airways, a plaque to honour the victims was erected at the Garden of Remembrance at St George's Interdenominational Chapel, Heathrow Airport.

== See also ==
- 1967 Nicosia Britannia disaster
