= British European Airways Flight 226 =

1961 aviation accident in Turkey

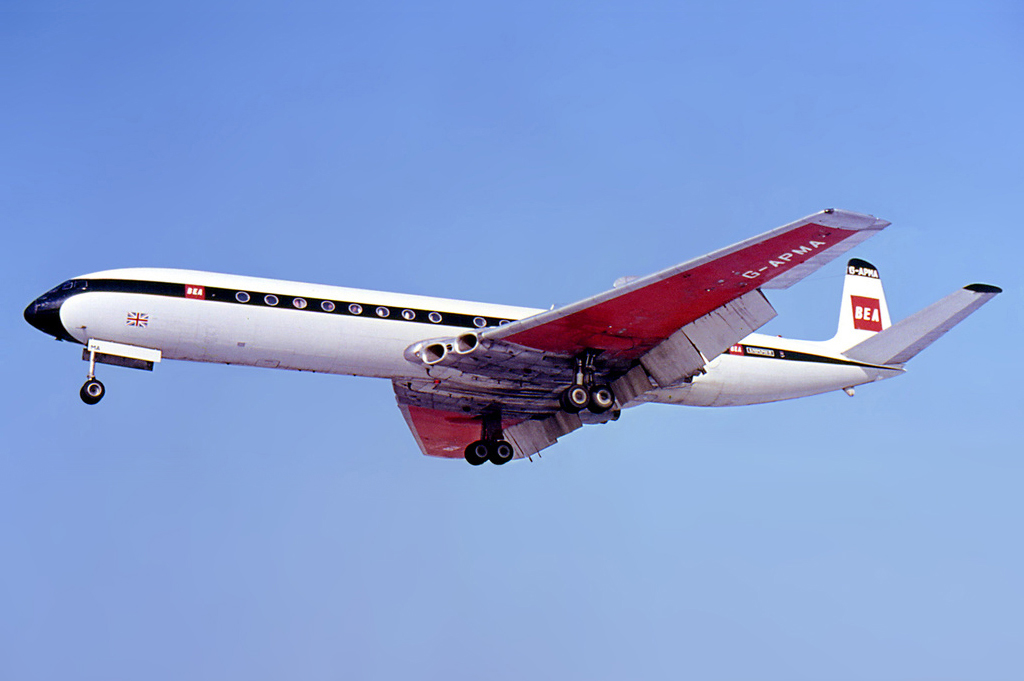
- A British European Airways de Havilland DH.106 Comet 4B, similar to the accident aircraft

Accident
- Date: 21 December 1961
- Summary: Stalled shortly after takeoff due to pilot error
- Site: Ankara Esenboğa Airport, Ankara, Turkey

Aircraft
- Aircraft type: de Havilland DH.106 Comet 4B
- Operator: British European Airways on behalf of Cyprus Airways
- IATA flight No.: BE226
- ICAO flight No.: BEA226
- Call sign: BEALINE 226
- Registration: G-ARJM
- Flight origin: London Heathrow Airport, London, United Kingdom
- 1st stopover: Rome Fiumicino Airport, Lazio, Italy
- 2nd stopover: Athens, Greece
- 3rd stopover: Istanbul, Turkey
- 4th stopover: Ankara Esenboğa Airport, Ankara, Turkey
- Last stopover: Nicosia, Cyprus
- Destination: Tel Aviv Airport, Tel Aviv, Israel
- Occupants: 34
- Passengers: 27
- Crew: 7
- Fatalities: 27
- Injuries: 6
- Survivors: 7

British European Airways Flight 226 was an international scheduled Cyprus Airways flight, operated on behalf of British European Airways, from London to Tel Aviv with stopovers in Rome, Athens, Istanbul, Ankara, and Nicosia. On 21 December 1961, the pilots lost control of the de Havilland DH.106 Comet 4B shortly after take-off from Ankara Esenboğa Airport. The aircraft stalled, sinking back to the ground where it impacted heavily, destroying the aircraft and killing 27 of the 34 people on board.

== Background ==
=== Aircraft ===
The aircraft involved was a de Havilland DH-106 Comet 4B, aircraft registration G-ARJM, equipped with four Rolls-Royce Avon 503 jet engines. Its first flight was on 8 June 1961.

=== Crew and passengers ===
Twenty-seven passengers took the flight on the flight leg from Ankara to Nicosia. The flight was operated by British European Airways on behalf of Cyprus Airways. On board was a seven-person crew, consisting of a captain and two first officers, from British European Airways, as well as four flight attendants from Cyprus Airways. The captain had logged 13,240 hours of flight experience, of which he completed 785 hours in the cockpit of the de Havilland Comet.

== Accident ==
The flight was uneventful until the departure from Ankara Airport. The ground time between landing and taking off again for the onward flight to Nicosia was 46 minutes. The aircraft then taxied to the starting point of runway 21. The takeoff run until reaching the rotation point was normal in terms of the speeds achieved and the duration. One to two seconds after takeoff, the aircraft assumed an excessive climb angle.

According to some eyewitnesses, it was twice the normal climbing angle, others said it was 45 to 50 degrees. Eyewitnesses stated that at this point the engine noise changed and one wing tilted. At an altitude of 450 feet, the aircraft, whose left wing was pointed downwards, experienced a stall. The plane fell flat to the ground and impacted 1,600 meters from the tower on a heading of 214 degrees at 11:43 p.m. local time. The accident killed all 7 crew members and 20 of the 27 passengers.

== Cause ==
The investigation into the accident revealed that the probable cause was a failure and/or disturbance in the captain's artificial horizon, which made him believe that the aircraft was not pitching up. This caused him to panic and pull the aircraft's nose steeply upwards after takeoff. This sequence so early caused the aircraft to stall quickly and crash.

== See also ==
- Air India Flight 855, a case of loss of control shortly after takeoff due to spatial disorientation.
- Air France Flight 447, a flight where one of the pilots continued to pull up, causing a subsequent stall.
