= Alpen, Alberta =

Coordinates: 54°25′31″N 112°55′31″W

Alpen is an unincorporated community in Alberta, Canada. It has an elevation is 2,273 ft.
