= Alpino =

Alpino may refer to:

- Alpino, a restaurant in Detroit, Michigan
- The Alpini, the elite mountain warfare soldiers of the Italian Army
- Prospero Alpini, and Italian physician and botanist known by the author abbreviation "Alpino"
- The Alpino parser, a natural language analysis system for Dutch
- R.N. Alpino, a Destroyer of the Regia Marina
