= Mount Ida Plantation =

Mount Ida
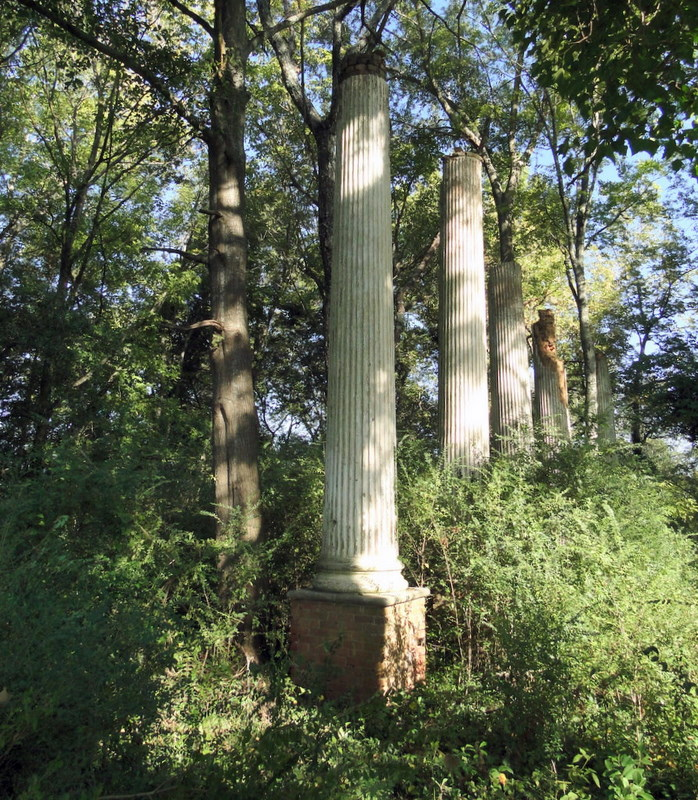
- Mount Ida ruins in 2010. Only 5 of 6 columns still stand.

- Location within Alabama
- 33.32211°N 86.17116°W
- Location: Talladega County, Alabama

History
- Built: 1840–58
- Built for: Walker Reynolds
- Demolished: 1956

Site notes
- Architectural style: Greek Revival
- Governing body: Private

Mount Ida, also known as the Walker Reynolds House, was an antebellum mansion, built in the Greek Revival style beginning in 1840 by Walker Reynolds, between Sylacauga and Talladega in rural Talladega County, Alabama, United States.

== History ==
Walker Reynolds was a wealthy planter and promoter of Talladega and Talladega County. He was born August 28, 1799, in Warren County, Georgia, and died January 18, 1871, in Talladega County. He came to Alabama in 1832, and settled among the Indians in Talladega County. In 1849 he was elected to the legislature on the Whig ticket, and during his service there, he succeeded in securing the passing of a charter giving to the county a railroad running through its entire length, then known as Alabama & Tennessee River Railway, and afterwards as the Selma, Rome and Dalton Railroad. After the session of 1849, he was not again in public life, but engaged in planting and milling, and the buying and selling of public lands. Before the start of the Civil War, he opposed secession, but went with his adopted state when she seceded. Because of his age he could not enter the Confederate States Army but he aided largely in the support of the needy families of the Confederate soldiers during the war, and raised and equipped a company at his own expense. He was known by the title of major, presumably, from his connection with the militia. He is buried in the family cemetery at his home, Mount Ida.

== Description ==
Initial construction on the fourteen-room mansion began in 1840, it was completed in sections until the portico was completed in 1858. The Greek Revival mansion featured a monumental veranda, edged by six fluted columns and topped by inverted bell-shaped capitals (a motif extremely rare among ante-bellum homes in the state). The six front columns were constructed of red brick and covered with hard plaster. The large windows on the balcony could be turned into doors providing access from the inside of the house as well as cool ventilation in the summer months. There was amethyst glass in the sidelights and transoms. The furnishings in the house were purchased on a trip to New York City. The front parlor was called 'The Blue Room' and was a replica of the Blue Room in the White House.

In 1949, the Kent family purchased the mansion and began a restoration to return Mt. Ida to its former glory. However, Mount Ida was struck by lightning in August 1956 and quickly burned to the ground. All that remains today are the front brick-and-plaster columns.

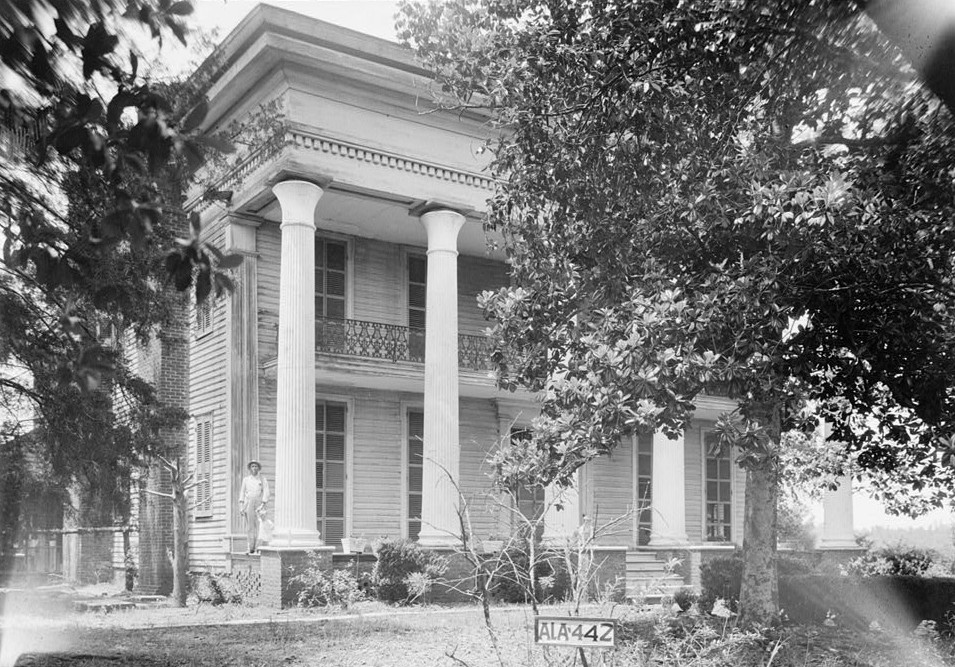
HABS Front view in 1935.

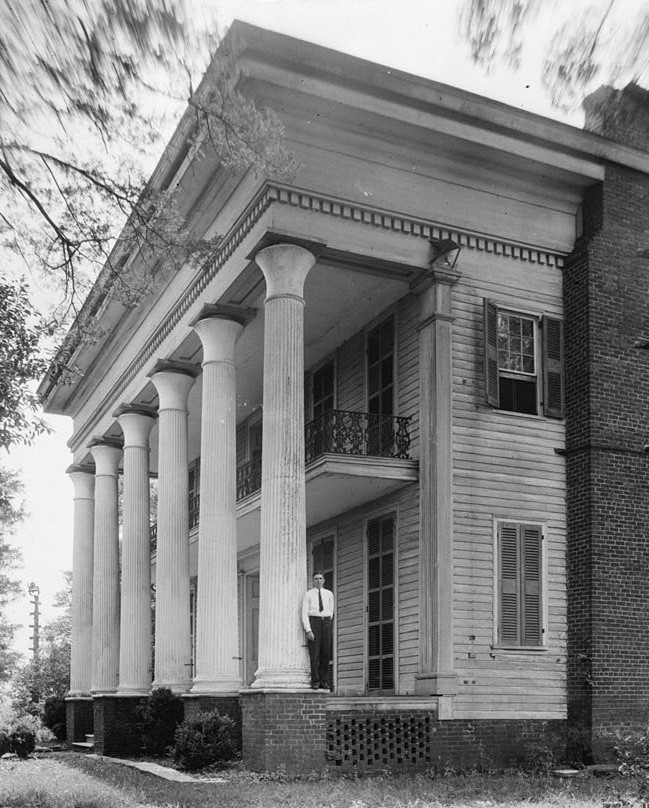
Another view of the front by HABS in 1935.

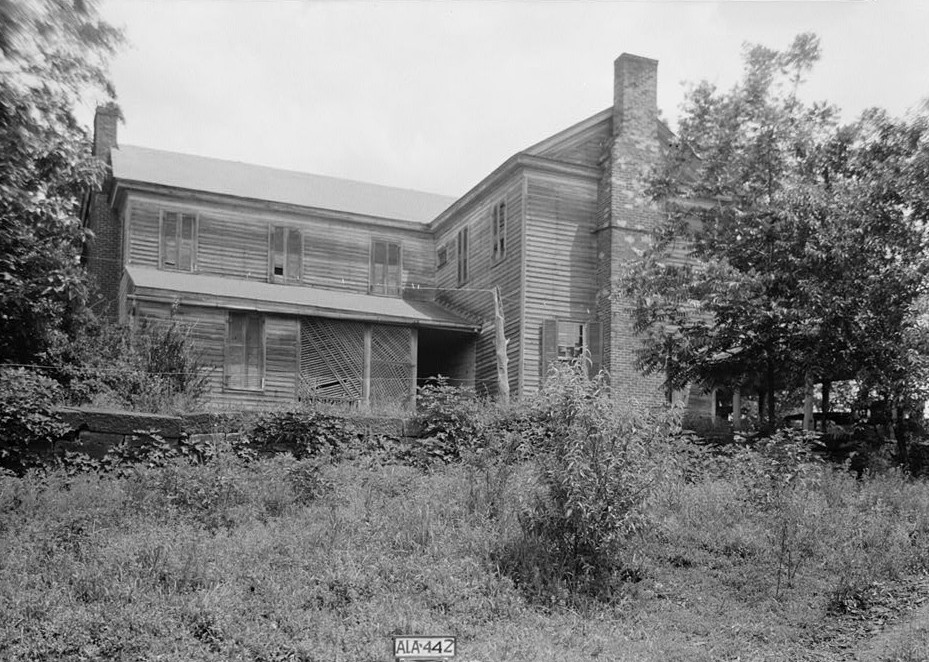
Side view by HABS 1935.

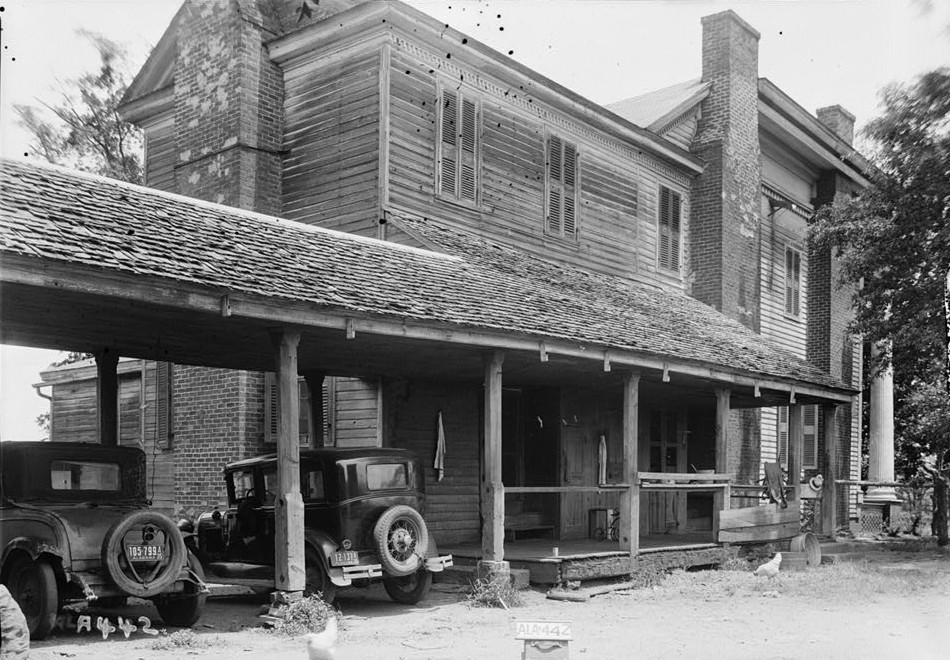
Rear view by HABS in 1935.

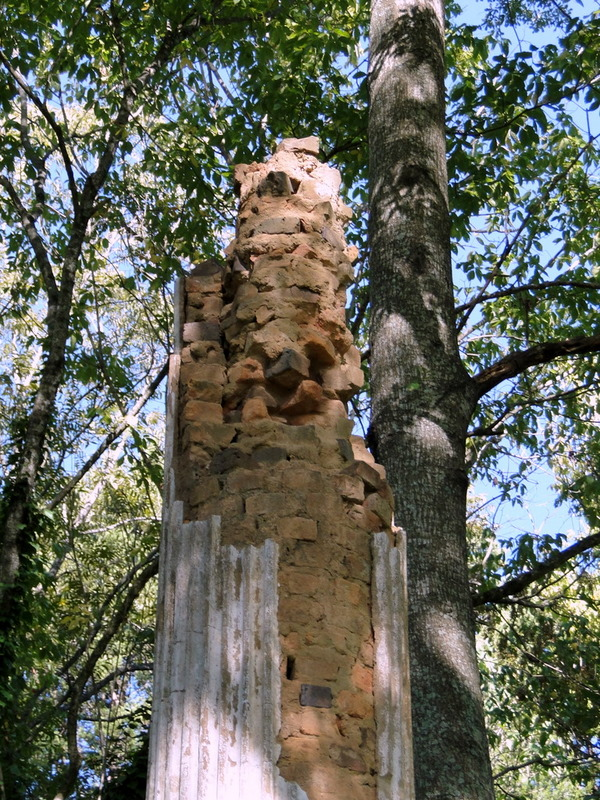
Detail of the ruins in 2010. Construction of columns: red brick & plaster.
