= Alpine Elementary School =

Alpine Elementary School may refer to:

- Alpine Elementary School (Alpine, Arizona)
- Alpine Elementary School, St. Vrain Valley School District, Longmont, Colorado
- Alpine Elementary School, Columbus City Schools, Ohio
- Alpine Elementary School, Alpine Independent School District, Alpine, Texas
- Alpine Elementary School, Alpine, Utah
