= Alpine butterfly =

Alpine butterfly may refer to:

== Biology ==
- Erebia, a genus of butterflies common in the Rocky Mountains of North America
- Parnassius, a genus of butterflies in Eurasia

== Knots ==
- Alpine butterfly knot, used to form a fixed loop in the middle of a rope
- Alpine butterfly bend, used to join the ends of two ropes together
