= Alpine, New York =

Hamlet in the state of New York, United States

- Hamlet
- Location within New York Location within the United States
- Coordinates: 42°18′47″N 76°43′27″W
- Country: United States
- State: New York
- County: Schuyler
- Elevation: 1,165 ft (355 m)
- Time zone: UTC-5 (Eastern (EST))
  - Summer (DST): UTC-4 (EDT)
- ZIP code: 14805
- Area code: 607
- GNIS feature ID: 942392

Alpine is a hamlet in Schuyler County, New York, United States. The community is located along New York State Route 224, 3.7 miles (6.0 km) east-southeast of Odessa. Alpine has a post office with ZIP code 14805, which opened on April 15, 1852.
