= Alpine Lake / Ata Puai =

Small lake in the West Coast Region of New Zealand

- Location within New Zealand
- Interactive map of Alpine Lake / Ata Puai
- Coordinates: 43°17′13″S 170°8′17″E
- Primary outflows: Five Mile Creek
- Basin countries: New Zealand
- Surface area: 57 hectares (140 acres)
- Surface elevation: approx 90 metres (300 ft)

Alpine Lake / Ata Puai is a small lake in the West Coast Region of New Zealand. The lake is located 6 kilometres (3.7 mi) south of Ōkārito and 4 kilometres (2.5 mi) west of the larger Lake Mapourika. "Alpine" is something of a misnomer as the lake is only 4 kilometres (2.5 mi) from the sea and at an elevation of less than 100 metres (330 ft).
