= Alpino (restaurant) =

Restaurant in Detroit, Michigan, U.S.

- Interactive map of Alpino

Restaurant information
- Established: May 1, 2023
- Owner: David Richter
- Manager: Conrado Mari
- Head chef: Colin Campbell
- Chef: David Richter
- Food type: Alpine
- Location: 1426 Bagley Street, Corktown, Detroit, Michigan, 48216, United States
- Coordinates: 42°19′48″N 83°03′54″W
- Website: www.alpinodetroit.com

Alpino Detroit, shortened as Alpino, is an Alpine restaurant in the Corktown neighborhood of Detroit, Michigan, United States. The restaurant began operations on May 1, 2023, in a space previously occupied by Lady of the House. In 2024, Alpino was a semifinalist in the Best New Restaurant category of the James Beard Foundation Award.

== Description ==
The main restaurant building is 3,200 square feet, while the patio is 1,500 square feet. Below the building is a 3,000 square-foot basement. The wooden interior of the restaurant contains a fireplace as well as a painting of an Alpine cow.

Alpino's menu consists of nuts, mostarda, house-baked bread, and salads. The restaurant also features a Croziflette, a macaroni and cheese dish made of taleggio cheese, buckwheat pasta, and lardons.

== History ==
Alpino was established on May 1, 2023, at 1426 Bagley Street, in a space previously occupied by Kate Williams's restaurant Lady of the House. On that day, Alpino had a staff of 30 people. The restaurant's patio opened on May 22.

== Reception ==
In 2024, Alpino was a semifinalist in the Best New Restaurant category of the James Beard Foundation Award.
