= Alpine, Talladega County, Alabama =

Alpine, Alabama
- Unincorporated community
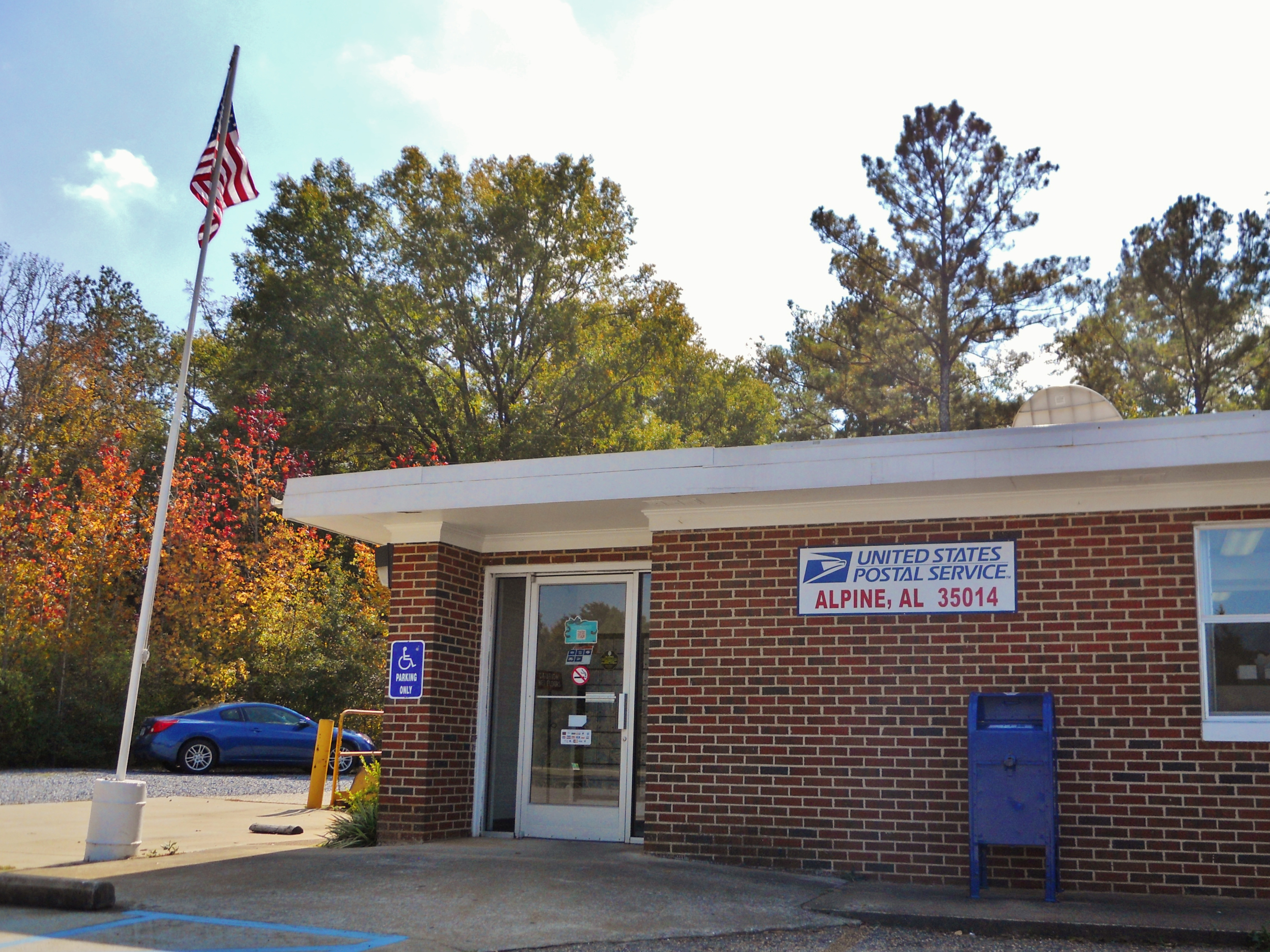
- Alpine Post Office

- Location within Alabama Location within the United States
- Coordinates: 33°20′55″N 86°14′19″W
- Country: United States
- State: Alabama
- County: Talladega
- Elevation: 469 ft (143 m)
- Time zone: UTC-6 (Central (CST))
  - Summer (DST): UTC-5 (CDT)
- ZIP code: 35014
- Area code: 256
- GNIS feature ID: 113045

Alpine is an unincorporated community in Talladega County, Alabama, United States, located southwest of Talladega and northwest of Childersburg. It is known to Alabama residents as the site of YMCA Camp Cosby. The community gained its name from Alpine, a plantation owned by the Welch family. Over time, a town grew up around the plantation when a railroad came through. Initially known as Welchs Depot, it eventually came to be known as Alpine, in honor of the plantation.

== Demographics ==
=== Alpine Precinct (1900-1950) ===
Historical population
Census	Pop.	Note	%±
1900	1,308		—
1910	1,454		11.2%
1920	1,555		6.9%
1930	1,461		−6.0%
1940	1,593		9.0%
1950	1,689		6.0%
U.S. Decennial Census

Alpine has never reported separately as an unincorporated community on the U.S. Census. However, the 6th precinct of Talladega County was named for Alpine beginning in 1900 (renamed from Mardisville precinct), and it continued to report until 1950. In 1930 and 1940, when the census reported racial statistics for the precincts, it had a Black majority.

In 1960, the precinct was merged as part of a larger reorganization of counties into the census division of Sycamore-Winterboro.

== Photo gallery ==
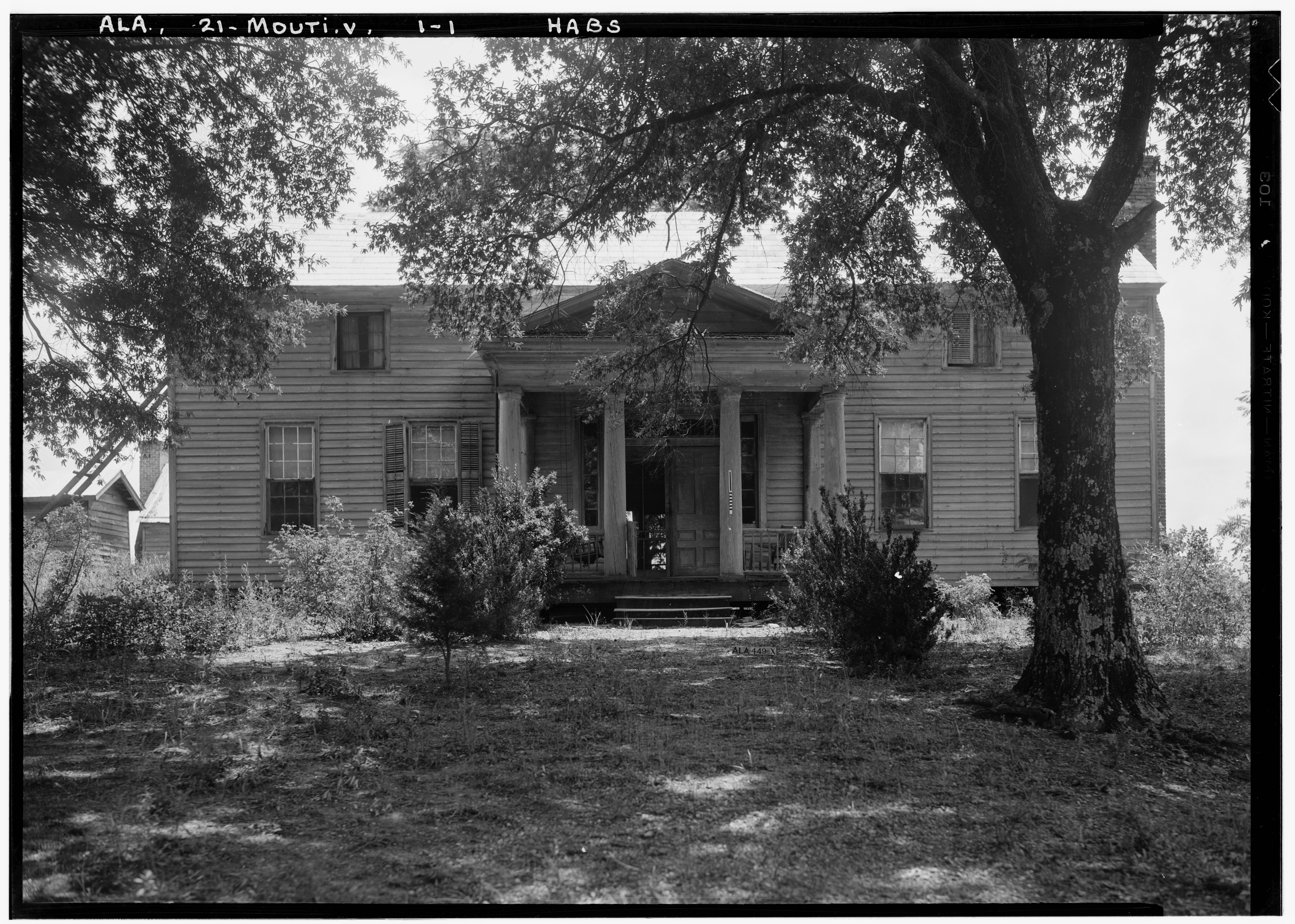
Jenkins-Carlton-Autry House, 1937

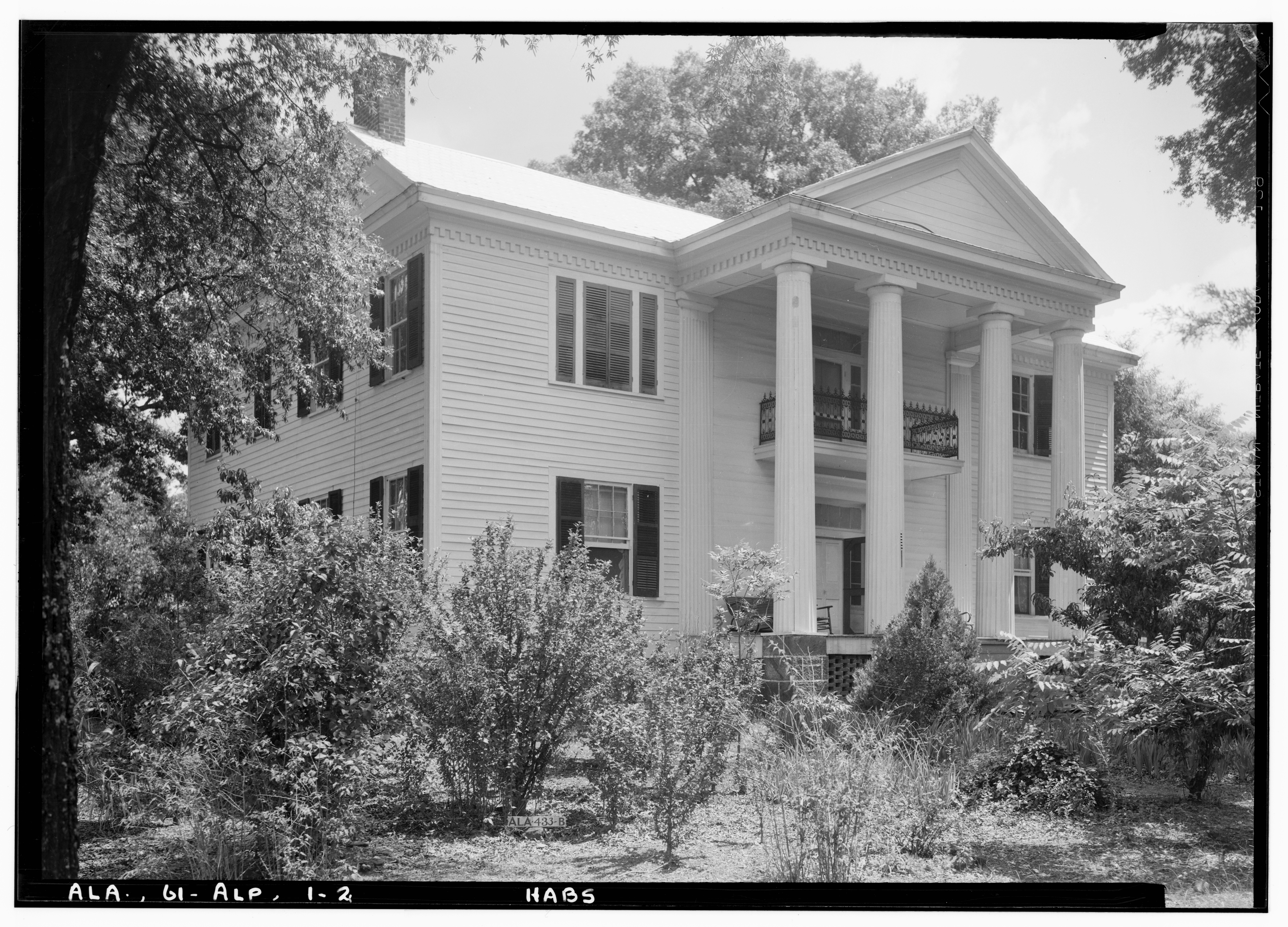
Alpine Plantation, 1937

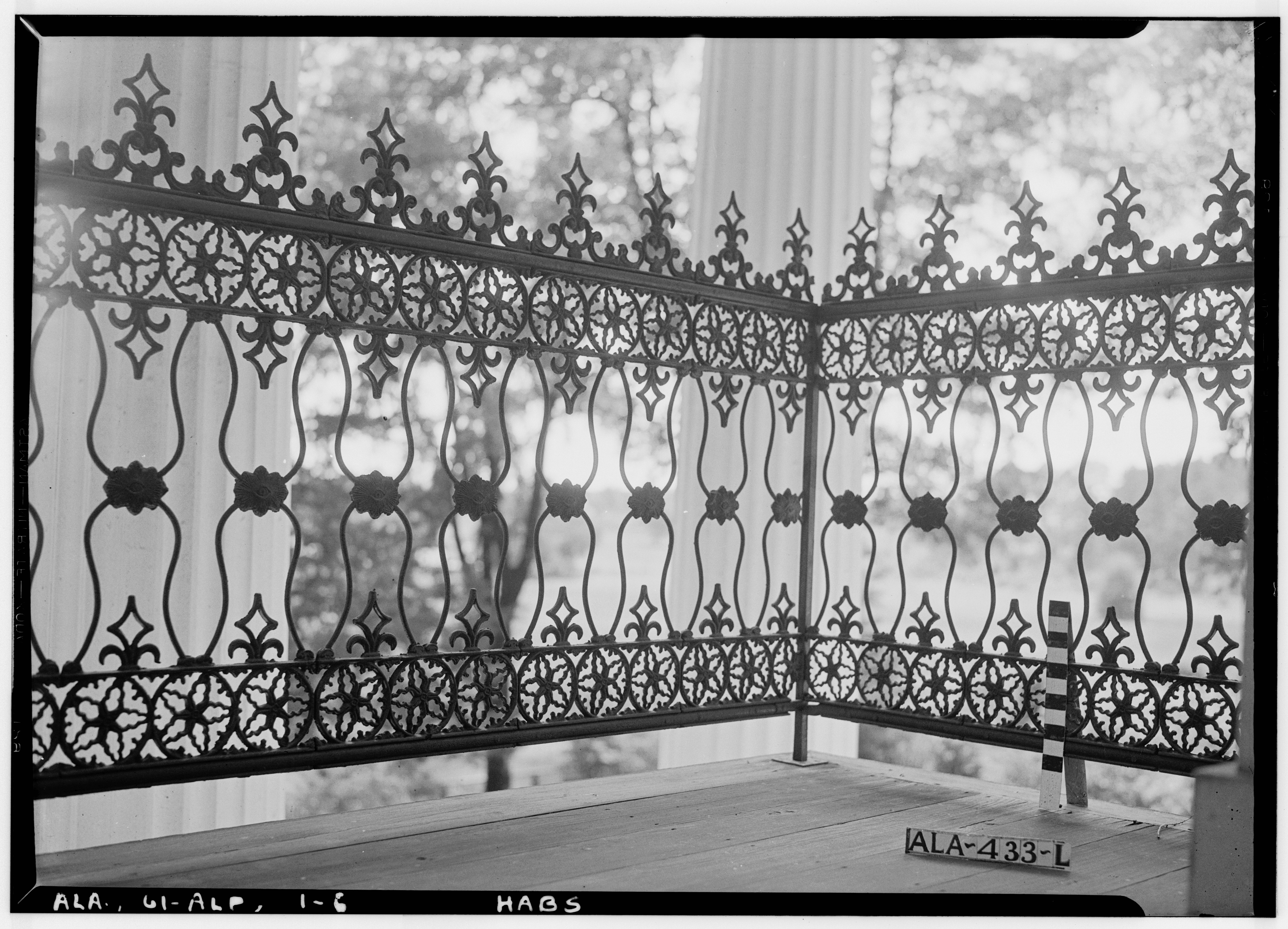
Second story iron balustrade, Alpine House, 1937

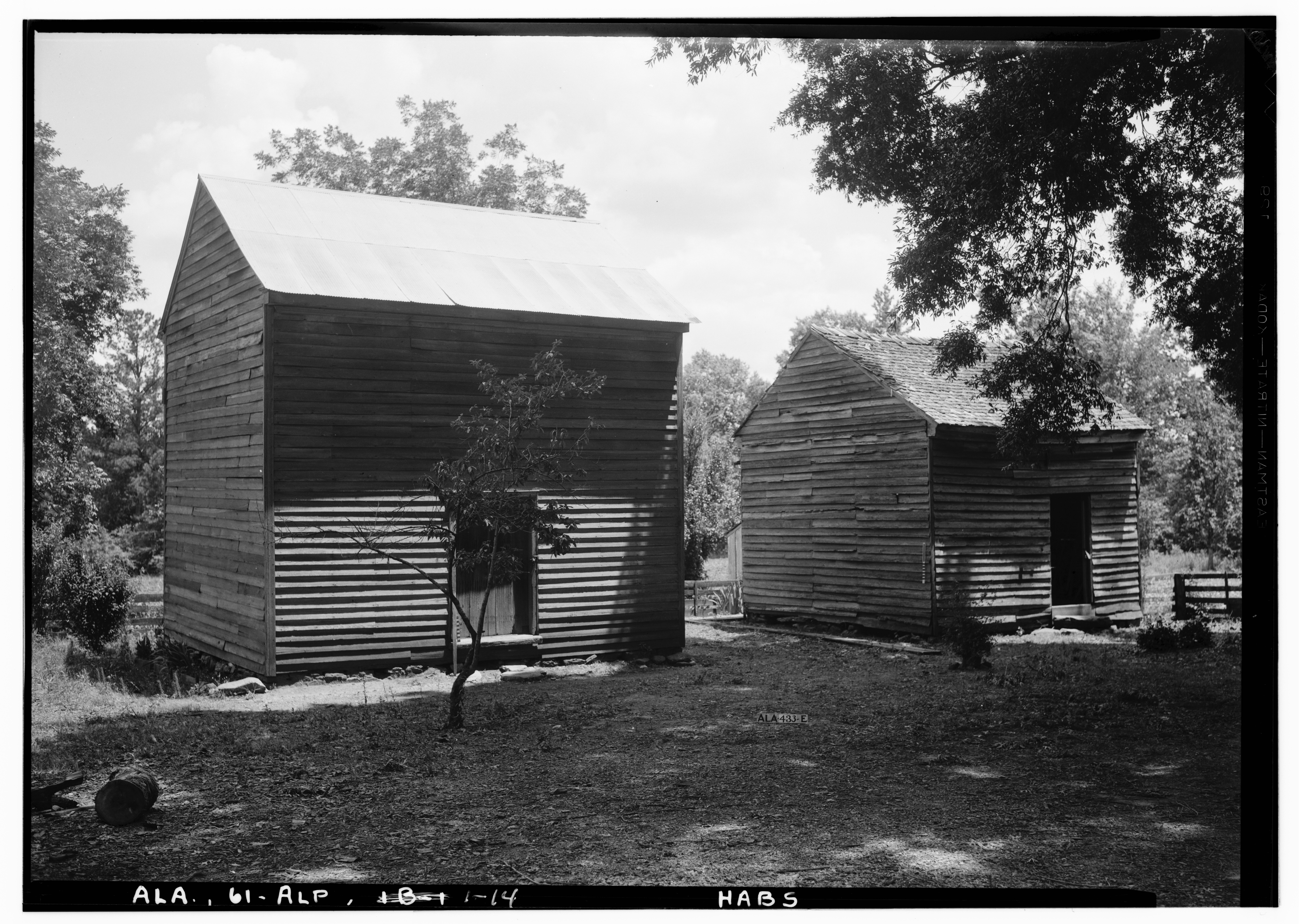
Two old buildings at Alpine Plantation, 1937

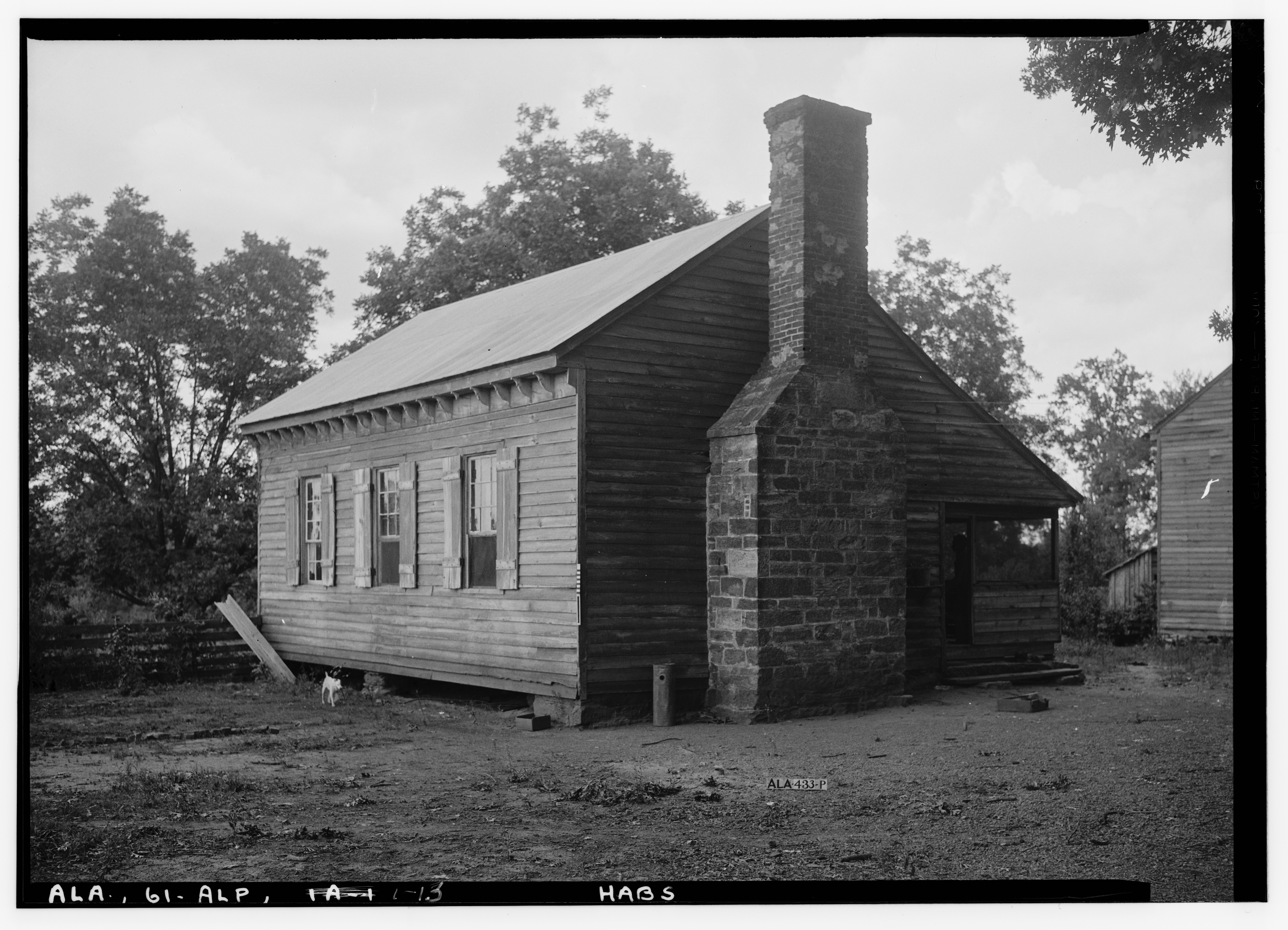
Alpine Plantation kitchen building, 1937

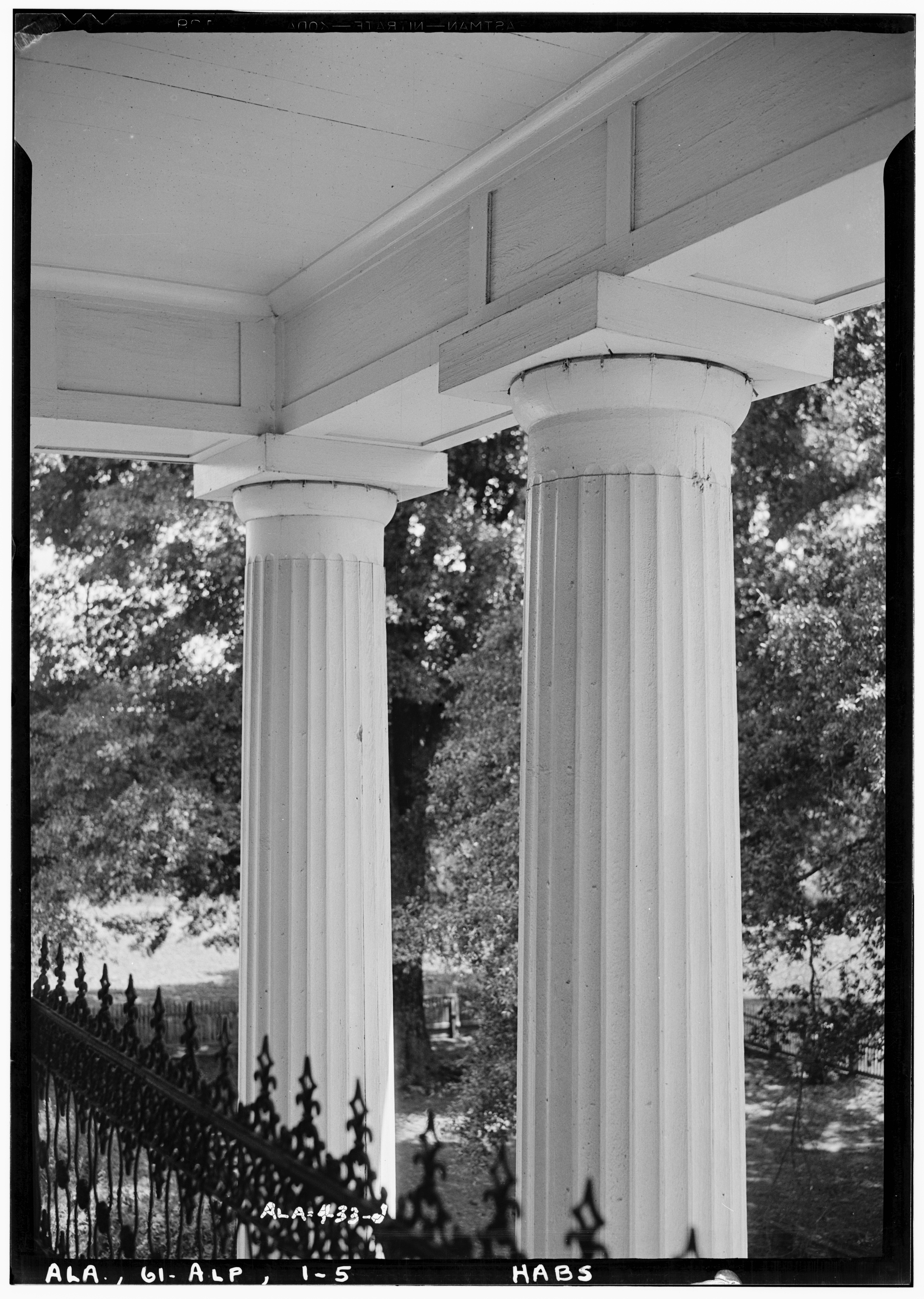
Alpine Plantation front columns, 1937

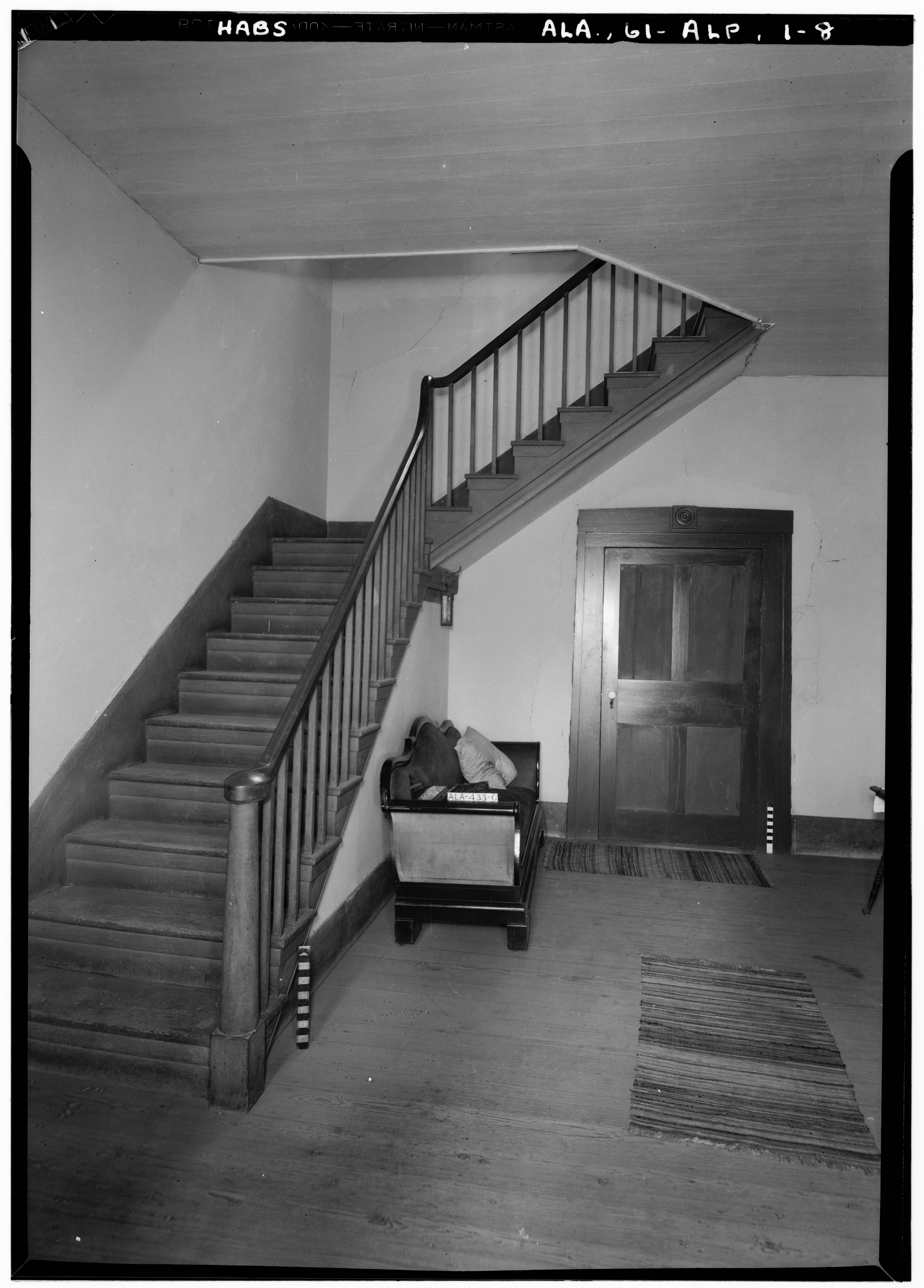
Alpine Plantation main hall and stairway, 1937
