= Auster Alpine =

1950s British light aircraft

J/5 Alpine
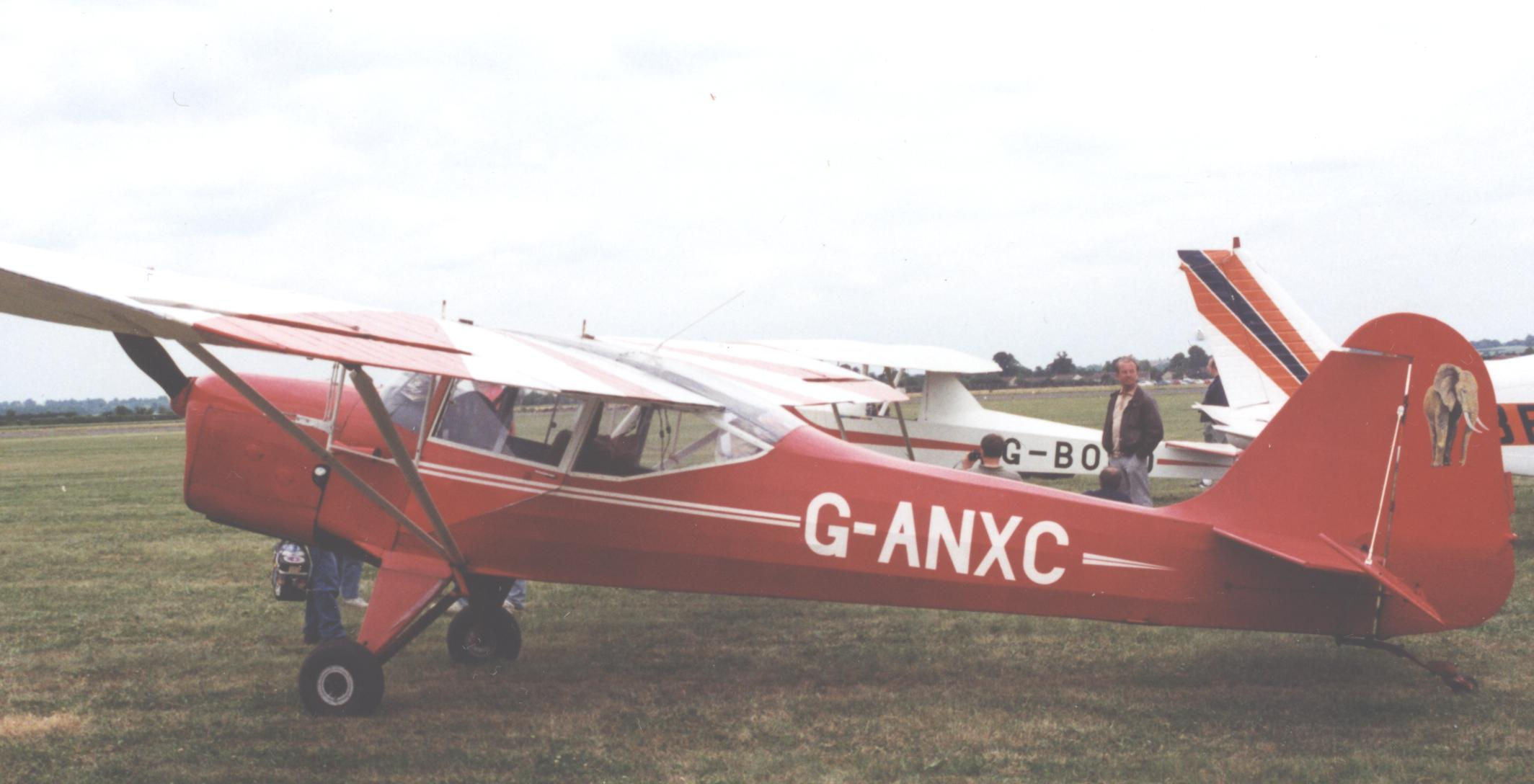
- Auster J/5R Alpine at Wellesbourne Mountford Airfield in June 1996

General information
- Type: Trainer/tourer
- Manufacturer: Auster Aircraft Limited
- Number built: 10

History
- Developed from: Auster J/5 Aiglet Trainer

The Auster J/5 Alpine was a 1950s British single-engined four-seat high-wing training and touring monoplane built by Auster Aircraft Limited at Rearsby, Leicestershire.

== History ==
The Alpine was a hybrid aircraft based on the fuselage of the J/5 Aiglet Trainer fitted with the wings from the J-1 Autocrat. The prototype was converted from an Auster J-5L Aiglet Trainer.

== Variants ==
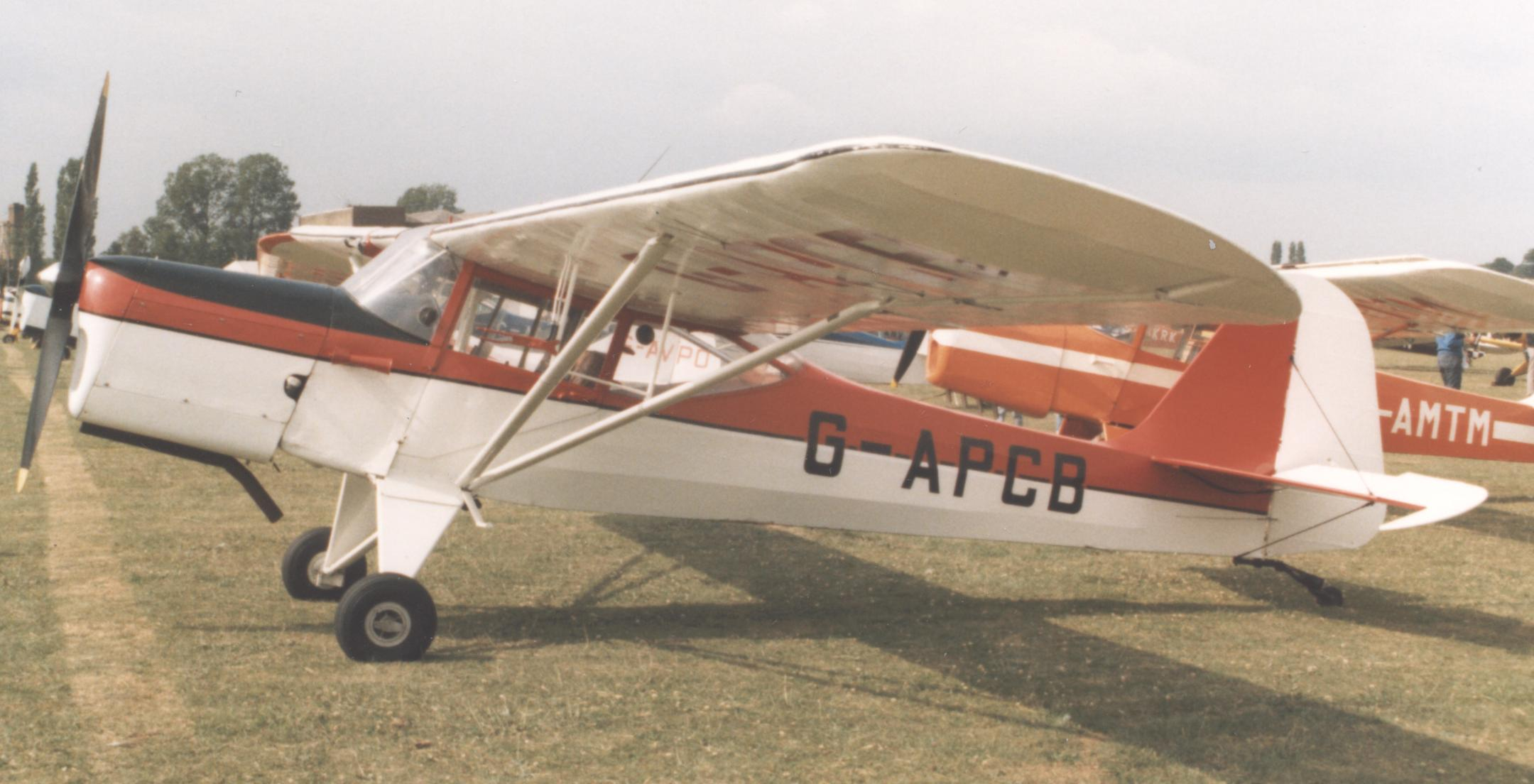
Auster J/5Q Alpine at PFA Rally at Cranfield airfield, Bedfordshire, in July 1989

- Auster J/5R Alpine – production version with de Havilland Gipsy Major 10 engine, six built.
- Auster J/5Q Alpine – lower-powered version with a de Havilland Gipsy Major 1 engine, four built.

== Specifications (J/5R) ==
Data from British Civil Aircraft since 1919

General characteristics

- Crew: 1
- Capacity: 2 passengers
- Length: 23 ft 6 in (7.16 m)
- Wingspan: 36 ft 0 in (10.97 m)
- Height: 6 ft 6 in (1.98 m)
- Wing area: 185 sq ft (17.2 m^{2})
- Empty weight: 1,464 lb (664 kg)
- Max takeoff weight: 2,250 lb (1,021 kg)
- Fuel capacity: 32 imp gal (38 US gal; 150 L)
- Powerplant: 1 × de Havilland Gipsy Major 10 four-cylinder air-cooled inverted piston engine, 145 hp (108 kW)

Performance

- Maximum speed: 128 mph (206 km/h, 111 kn)
- Cruise speed: 112 mph (180 km/h, 97 kn)
- Range: 460 mi (740 km, 400 nmi)
- Service ceiling: 22,000 ft (6,700 m)
- Rate of climb: 1,025 ft/min (5.21 m/s)
- Takeoff distance to 50 ft (15 m): 630 ft (190 m)
