= California State Route 207 =

Highway in California

State Route 207
- Mount Reba Road
- SR 207 highlighted in red

Route information
- Maintained by Caltrans
- Length: 1.360 mi (2.189 km)

Major junctions
- South end: SR 4 near Bear Valley
- North end: Bear Valley Mountain Resort at Mount Reba

Location
- Country: United States
- State: California
- County: Alpine

Highway system
- State highways in California; Interstate; US; State; Scenic; History; Pre‑1964; Unconstructed; Deleted; Freeways
← SR 206	→ SR 209

State Route 207 (SR 207), named Mount Reba Road along its entire length, is a state highway in the U.S. state of California that serves as a spur route from State Route 4 near the community of Bear Valley in Alpine County to Mount Reba and the Bear Valley Mountain Ski Resort.

== Route description ==
Route 207 is defined in section 507 of the California Streets and Highways Code, and that the highway is "from Route 4 near Lake Alpine to the Mt. Reba Ski Area". The definition has not yet been corrected to reflect the ski area's current name, Bear Valley Mountain Resort.

State Route 207 begins at State Route 4 as a two-lane road, and heads north to its northern terminus at Mount Reba, where it expands to make way for the Bear Valley Mountain Resort parking lot. Because SR 207 is the only way to access the ski resort, the state highway generally has more traffic during Bear Valley's peak season during the winter than when it is not snowing in the area. Traffic is further exacerbated due to the typical winter closure of Ebbetts Pass, located on SR 4 east of the resort, resulting in Bear Valley only being accessible from the west.

SR 207 is not part of the National Highway System, a network of highways that are considered essential to the country's economy, defense, and mobility by the Federal Highway Administration.

== Major intersections ==
Except where prefixed with a letter, postmiles were measured on the road as it was when the route was established, based on the alignment that existed at the time, and do not necessarily reflect current mileage. Postmile prefixes include: R reflecting a realignment in the route since then, M indicating a second realignment, L referring to an overlap due to a correction or change, and T indicating postmiles classified as temporary. Segments that remain unconstructed or have been relinquished to local control may be omitted. The entire route is in Alpine County.

Location	Postmile	Destinations	Notes
	0.00	SR 4	South end of SR 207; SR 4 east through Ebbetts Pass closed in winters
Mount Reba	1.36	Bear Valley Mountain Ski Resort boundary	North end of SR 207
1.000 mi = 1.609 km; 1.000 km = 0.621 mi
