= Alpine lake (disambiguation) =

Alpine lake is a class of lakes found at high altitudes.

It may also refer to:

== Lakes ==
- Alpine Lake (Marin County, California), a reservoir in Marin County, California
- Alpine Lake (Mono County, California), a natural lake in Mono County, California
- Alpine Lake / Ata Puai, a lake in the West Coast Region of New Zealand
- Alpine Lake (Central Sawtooth Wilderness), a glacial lake in Custer County, Idaho
- Alpine Lake (Northern Sawtooth Wilderness), a glacial lake in Custer County, Idaho

== Other uses ==
- Alpine Lake, West Virginia, a gated community
- Alpine Lakes Wilderness, a wilderness area in the Cascade Range of Washington (state)

== See also ==
- Lake Alpine, California, an unincorporated community in Alpine County, California
- Lake Alpine, a lake in Alpine County, California
