= Bear Valley, California =

Bear Valley, California may refer to:

- Bear Valley, Alpine County, California, a census-designated place, the site of the Bear Valley Music Festival
  - Bear Valley Mountain Resort, a ski resort
- Bear Valley, Colusa County, California
- Bear Valley, Mariposa County, California, a census-designated place

== See also ==
- Big Bear Valley, San Bernardino County, California
