= California State Route 4 =

State highway in California

State Route 4
- SR 4 highlighted in red

Route information
- Maintained by Caltrans
- Length: 197 mi (317 km)
- Existed: 1934–present
- Tourist routes: Ebbetts Pass Scenic Byway
- Restrictions: Segment through Ebbetts Pass closed during winter

Major junctions
- West end: I-80 in Hercules
- I-680 in Pacheco; SR 242 in Concord; SR 160 in Antioch; I-5 in Stockton; SR 99 in Stockton; CR J6 in Farmington; SR 49 in Angels Camp; SR 207 near Lake Alpine
- East end: SR 89 near Markleeville

Location
- Country: United States
- State: California
- Counties: Contra Costa, San Joaquin, Stanislaus, Calaveras, Alpine

Highway system
- State highways in California; Interstate; US; State; Scenic; History; Pre‑1964; Unconstructed; Deleted; Freeways
← SR 3	→ I-5

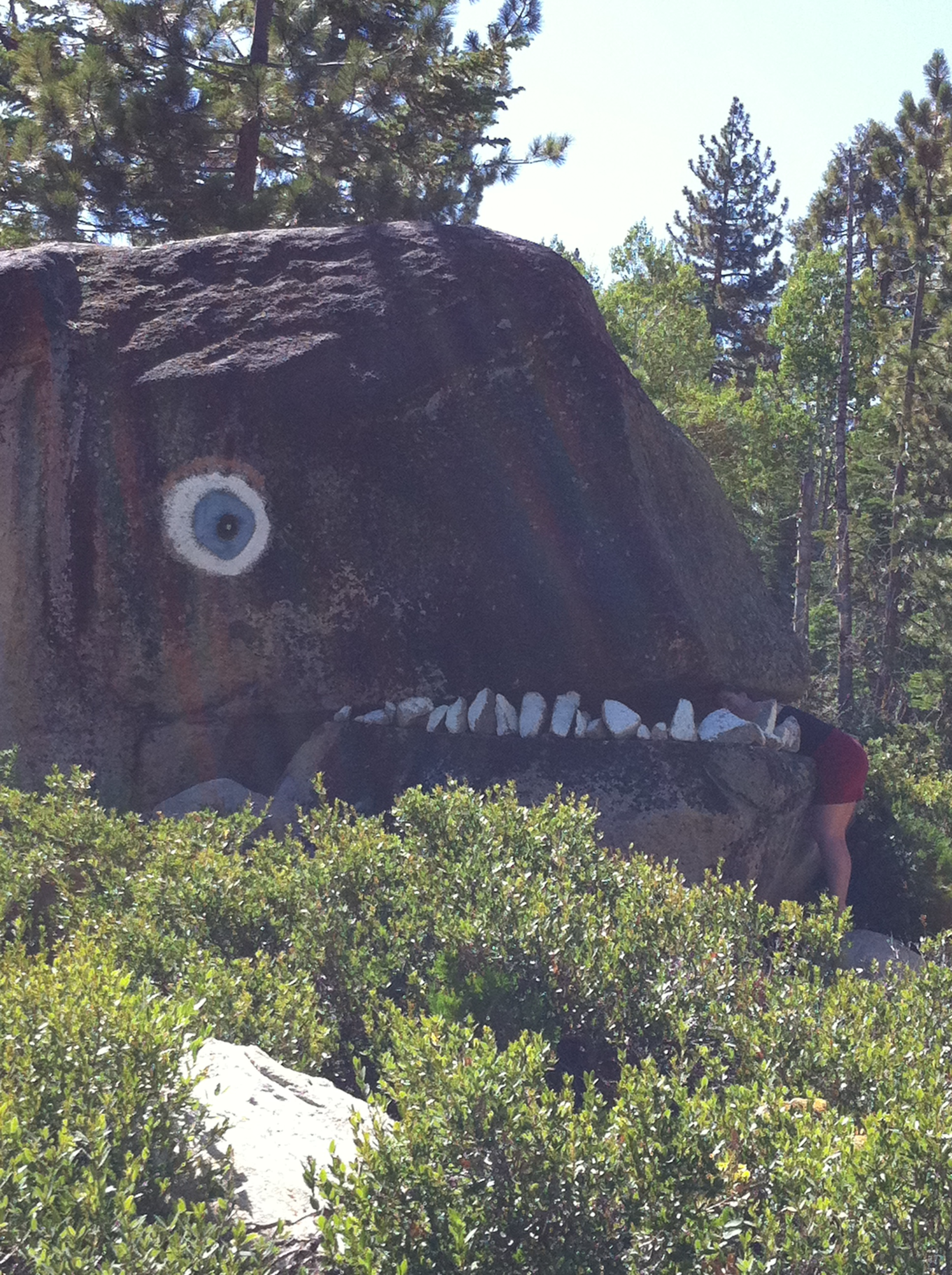
Roadside art, Ebbetts Pass Scenic Byway

State Route 4 (SR 4) is an east–west state highway in the U.S. state of California, routed from Interstate 80 in the San Francisco Bay Area to State Route 89 in the Sierra Nevada. It roughly parallels the Sacramento-San Joaquin River Delta, a popular area for boating and fishing, with a number of accesses to marinas and other attractions. After crossing the Central Valley, the highway ascends up the Sierra foothills. It passes through Ebbetts Pass and contains the Ebbetts Pass Scenic Byway, a National Scenic Byway.

== Route description ==
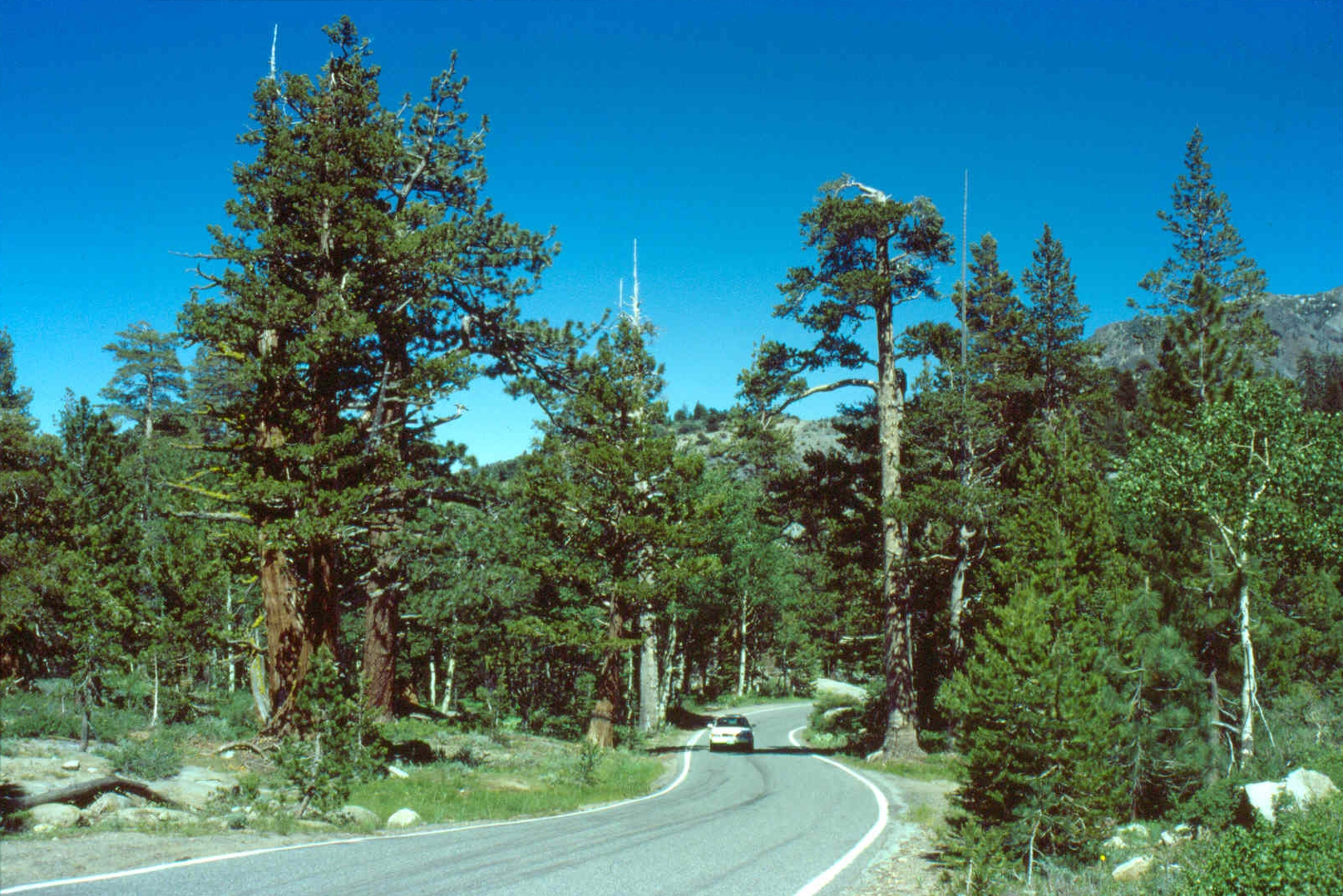
Route 4 through Humboldt-Toiyabe National Forest

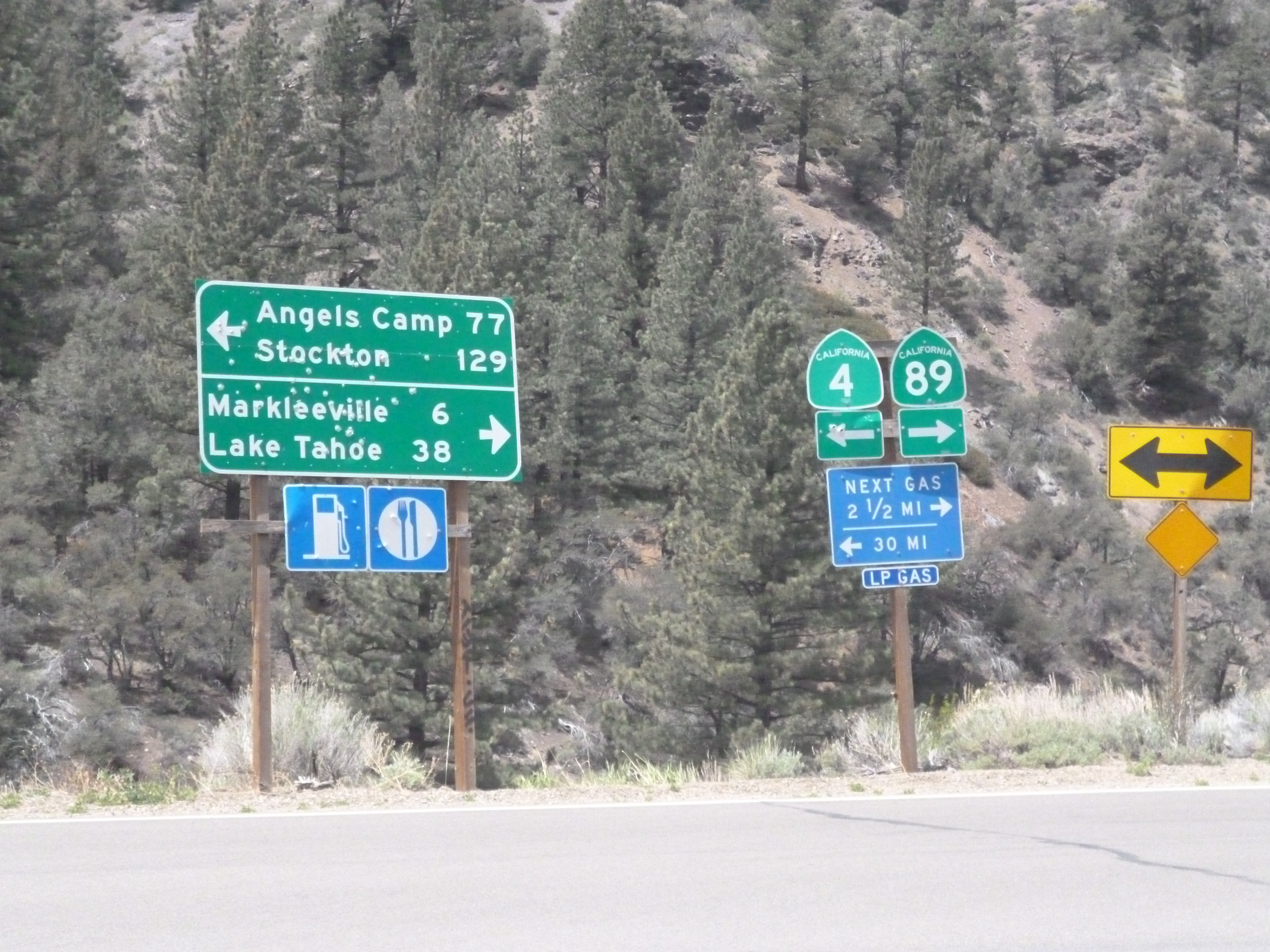
Intersection of California State Routes 4 & 89

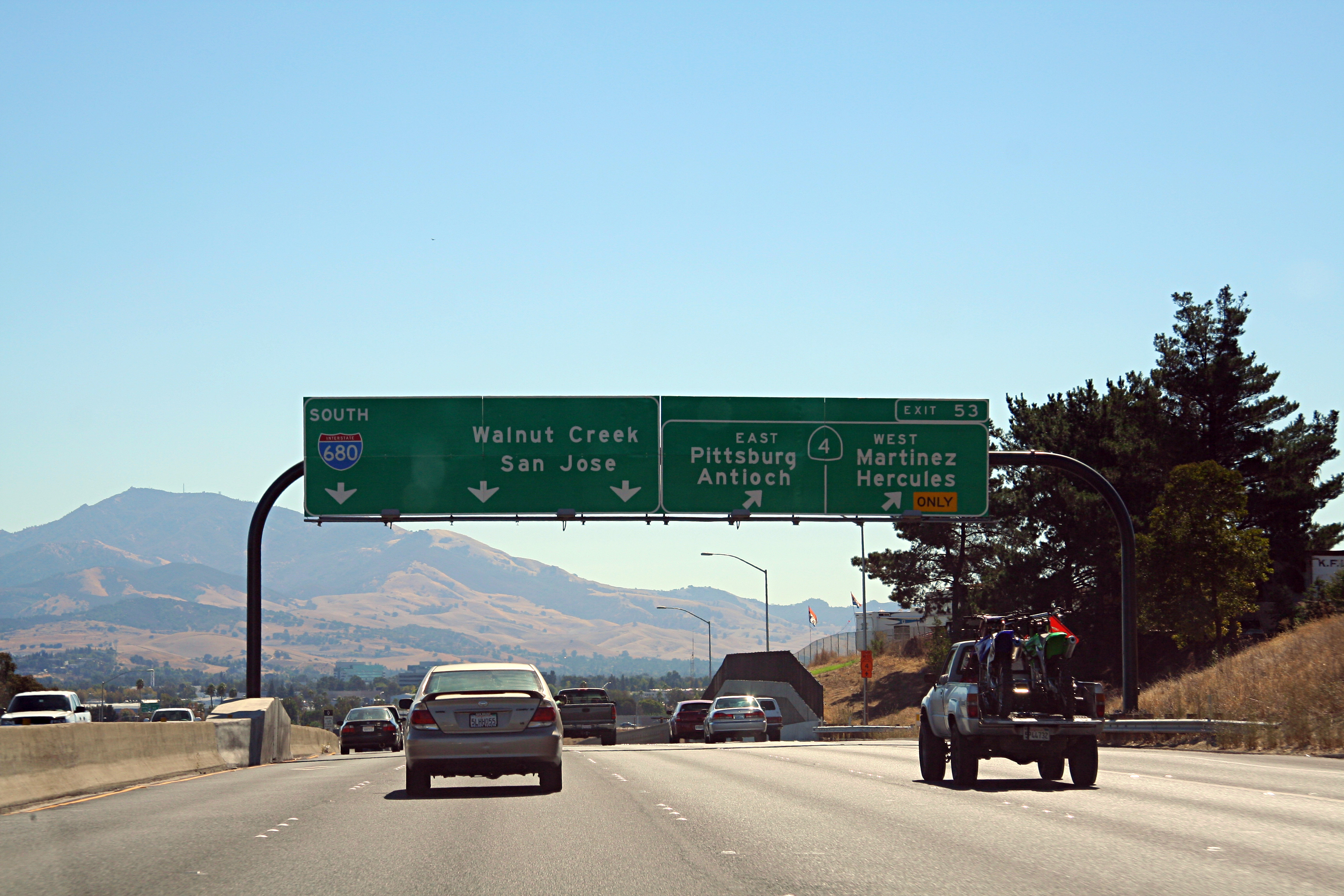
Interstate 680 crossing State Route 4, with Mount Diablo rising in background. September 30, 2007.

Route 4 is defined in section 304 of the California Streets and Highways Code. The definition omits the concurrencies with various other routes instead of duplicating those segments in those other routes' definitions in the code:

Route 4 is from:
(a) Route 80 in Hercules to Route 5 in Stockton via north of Concord and via Antioch.
(b) Route 5 to Route 99.
(c) Route 99 in Stockton to Route 49 at Altaville via the vicinity of Copperopolis.
(d) Route 49 in Angels Camp to Route 89 near Markleeville via Murphys, Calaveras Big Trees, Dorrington, and Bear Valley.

SR 4 begins in Hercules at San Pablo Avenue just to the west of Interstate 80 as part of John Muir Parkway (the actual parkway extends west of San Pablo Avenue as a city-maintained thoroughfare). SR 4 starts heading east as a divided four-lane freeway from its junction at Interstate 80, but then the route's eastbound lanes become an expressway for a short section in unincorporated Contra Costa County between Sycamore Avenue and Cummings Skyway. After becoming a full freeway again, SR 4 runs through Martinez and past the John Muir National Historic Site and the historic Franklin Canyon Adobe. SR 4 then enters another unincorporated area of Contra Costa County where it intersects with Interstate 680 and becomes the California Delta Highway. SR 4 then becomes an eight-lane freeway through Concord, Pittsburg, and Antioch. The Yellow Line of the Bay Area Rapid Transit (BART) system runs in the freeway's center median from the Port Chicago Highway interchange in Concord to just east of the Hillcrest Avenue interchange in Antioch, where that line currently ends at the Antioch station. The freeway then becomes a four-lane freeway again as it turns southward at its intersection with SR 160, bypassing the Bay Area's rapidly growing and outermost eastern suburbs of Oakley and Brentwood. The freeway ends after the Balfour Road interchange, becoming a conventional two-lane highway. SR 4 then passes the suburb of Discovery Bay before continuing east across Victoria Island and Roberts Island. From SR 160 to Marsh Creek Road, the highway is also known as the John Marsh Heritage Highway.

SR 4 continues east to Stockton, where it briefly joins Interstate 5 and then enters a separate freeway (known locally as the Crosstown Freeway) routing almost directly through downtown Stockton. The route then runs concurrent with State Route 99 before running eastward into the Sierra through Angels Camp, one of the richest quartz mining sections of the Mother Lode and home of "The Celebrated Jumping Frog of Calaveras County", and Calaveras Big Trees State Park. The route runs through the 8,050 ft (2,450 m) Pacific Grade Summit on its way up to the 8,730 ft (2,660 m) Ebbetts Pass and ends at State Route 89 ten miles (16 km) west of Topaz Lake, on the California–Nevada border. However, "To SR 4" signage continues along southbound SR 89 north to near its intersection with State Route 88 in Woodfords, including reassurance shields for both SR 89 and SR 4 on top of the mileage sign just south of town. The portion from Arnold to its terminus is designated the Ebbetts Pass Scenic Byway, which is eventually one lane.

Through the mountains, SR 4 is not suitable for large trucks, buses, or RVs, as it becomes very steep and eventually single-track, with no center dividing line shortly after the Mount Reba Turnoff to Bear Valley Ski area, with tight switchbacks. Ebbetts Pass is not plowed for snow, and thus closes during the winter months, often from November through as late as May, blocking through traffic between the Mount Reba Turnoff and Markleeville.

SR 4 is part of the California Freeway and Expressway System. The segments of SR 4 between I-80 in Hercules and Balfour Road in Brentwood, and just west of Stockton to SR 49, are part of the National Highway System, a network of highways that are considered essential to the country's economy, defense, and mobility by the Federal Highway Administration. SR 4 is eligible to be included in the State Scenic Highway System; however, it is only a scenic highway as designated by Caltrans from a point east of Arnold to SR 89, meaning that it is a substantial section of highway passing through a "memorable landscape" with no "visual intrusions", where the potential designation has gained popular favor with the community. SR 4 is also known as part of the John Muir Parkway from I-80 in Hercules to I-680 near Martinez, named for the environmentalist John Muir. The stretch through Franklin Canyon was once known as "Blood Alley".

== History ==
Although segments of Route 4 had been part of the state highway system since 1909, Route 4 was officially designated as such between US Route 40 (now Interstate 80) and State Route 99 in 1934. Prior to that date, the then-existing segment was officially known as the "Borden Highway", and the bridge over the San Joaquin River is still referred to as the "Borden Highway Bridge" in tidal tables. Construction of Route 4 did not finish until 1935, however.

The portion of Route 4 from US Route 40 to State Route 24 was added to the highway system in 1933 as Legislative Route Number (LRN) 106. East of the concurrency with State Route 24 to State Route 49, Route 4 was designated as LRN 75 from 1931 to 1934. Finally, the segment from State Route 49 to State Route 89 was signed as LRN 24 from 1909 to 1934.

In the 1970s, a significant portion of the Filipino American community of "Little Manila" in Stockton was demolished when the "Crosstown Freeway" was constructed, displacing what was once the largest population of Filipinos outside of the Philippines. The freeway, while not yet designated SR 4, was initially constructed from a long-term temporary west end at Fresno Avenue, past I-5, up to a temporary east end at Stanislaus Street, essentially becoming a "freeway to nowhere." In 1993, construction of the Crosstown Freeway from Stanislaus Street to SR 99 was finally completed. It is officially the Ort J. Lofthus Freeway for which it is named after the local civic leader lobbied to get construction of the freeway finished. SR 4, which originally was routed on Charter Way (now Dr. Martin Luther King Jr. Boulevard) and portions of Mariposa and Farmington Roads, transferred its designation onto the Crosstown between I-5 and SR 99. In December 2016, the Crosstown Freeway west of I-5 (though technically not part of SR 4) was extended to Navy Drive via a viaduct bypassing the Boggs Tract neighborhood in Stockton. The connection to Fresno Avenue was subsequently closed to traffic permanently. This was to alleviate heavy traffic to and from the Port of Stockton that plagued the Boggs Tract neighborhood for several decades. Despite being in the planning books for decades, it is unclear if the Crosstown Freeway past Navy Drive will ever be extended to SR 4 west of Stockton.

From 1998 to 2009, a road built by the State Route 4 Bypass Authority, named the State Route 4 Bypass, opened in three phases, bypassing Route 4 in Oakley and Brentwood to the south and west. Many of the signs and local maps designated this extension as simply "Bypass Road". A section of Marsh Creek Road was widened to serve as the connection between the bypass built by the authority and the original Route 4 towards Stockton. In 2012, Caltrans handed over authority for State Route 4 in Oakley and Brentwood to the respective cities. In return, it gained control of the bypass and the upgraded section of Marsh Creek Road, which officially became State Route 4.

In 2004, voters passed a half cent tax increase to fund widening from 4 to 8 lanes from Loveridge Road to SR 160. The project lasted from 2010 to 2016 through Pittsburg and Antioch, with the final configuration as three mixed use lanes and one High Occupancy Vehicle (HOV) lane in each direction and auxiliary lanes between interchanges as far as the interchange with SR 160. The median accommodates the eBART extension of the Bay Area Rapid Transit (BART) system. In early March 2016, reconfiguration of the interchange of SR 4 and SR 160 was officially opened, allowing westbound SR 4 traffic to access northbound SR 160 directly and southbound SR 160 to access eastbound SR 4.

From SR 160 to the Balfour Road interchange, it continues as a four-lane freeway. In 2011, Caltrans awarded $25 million toward upgrading the section from Lone Tree Way to Sand Creek Road to a full freeway and constructing an interchange at Sand Creek Road. Sand Creek interchange opened in 2015 and Balfour Road in 2018. The portion from Balfour Road to Vasco Road is single-lane each way and has a signal-controlled grade crossing at Marsh Creek Road.

The freeway segment of SR 4 in Stockton is part of a proposed route to upgrade SR 99 into I-7 or I-9. Under one proposal, the new interstate would go along SR 99 from the split with I-5 at Wheeler Ridge north through Fresno to Stockton, where the proposed route would then turn west via the SR 4 freeway to a terminus at I-5.

In 2016, Pittsburg moved to install surveillance cameras along their portion of the route, in response to a series of 20 freeway shootings in the area that had taken the lives of six people, and injured 11, in the past year.

== Major intersections ==
Except where prefixed with a letter, postmiles were measured on the road as it was in 1964, based on the alignment that existed at the time, and do not necessarily reflect current mileage. R reflects a realignment in the route since then, M indicates a second realignment, L refers to an overlap due to a correction or change, and T indicates postmiles classified as temporary. Segments that remain unconstructed or have been relinquished to local control may be omitted. The numbers reset at county lines; the start and end postmiles in each county are given in the county column.

County	Location	Postmile	Exit	Destinations	Notes
Contra Costa; CC 0.00-48.39	Hercules	0.00		John Muir Parkway	Contiunation beyond San Pablo Avenue
Contra Costa; CC 0.00-48.39	Hercules	0.00	1A	San Pablo Avenue	At-grade intersection; former US 40; west end of SR 4
Contra Costa; CC 0.00-48.39	Hercules	0.00	1B	I-80 – Oakland, San Francisco, Sacramento	No eastbound entrance from I-80 west; no exit number eastbound; I-80 exit 23
Contra Costa; CC 0.00-48.39	Hercules	0.78	1C	Willow Avenue – Hercules	No eastbound exit
Contra Costa; CC 0.00-48.39		R1.70	1	Sycamore Avenue	Eastbound signage
Contra Costa; CC 0.00-48.39		R1.70		Claeys Lane	Westbound signage; no exit number westbound
Contra Costa; CC 0.00-48.39			East end of freeway (eastbound only)		
Contra Costa; CC 0.00-48.39		2.70	3	Franklin Canyon	At-grade intersection eastbound; interchange westbound
Contra Costa; CC 0.00-48.39			West end of freeway (eastbound only)		
Contra Costa; CC 0.00-48.39		T4.89	5	Cummings Skyway to I-80 east – Port Costa, Crockett, Vallejo	
Contra Costa; CC 0.00-48.39		R5.17	6	McEwen Road – Port Costa	Westbound exit and eastbound entrance
Contra Costa; CC 0.00-48.39	Martinez	R8.55	9	Alhambra Avenue – Martinez	
Contra Costa; CC 0.00-48.39	Martinez	R9.19	10	Pine Street, Center Avenue	
Contra Costa; CC 0.00-48.39	Martinez	R10.33	11	Morello Avenue, Glacier Drive	
Contra Costa; CC 0.00-48.39	Martinez	12.41	12A	Pacheco Boulevard – Pacheco	Former SR 21
Contra Costa; CC 0.00-48.39		12.67	12B	I-680 south – Walnut Creek, San Jose	Walnut Creek is not signed eastbound; I-680 exit 53
Contra Costa; CC 0.00-48.39		12.67	12C	I-680 north – Benicia, Sacramento	Walnut Creek is not signed eastbound; I-680 exit 53
Contra Costa; CC 0.00-48.39	Concord	R13.65	13	Solano Way	
Contra Costa; CC 0.00-48.39	Concord	R14.67	15A	SR 242 south – Concord, Oakland	Northern terminus of SR 242; SR 242 exits 3B-C; former SR 24
Contra Costa; CC 0.00-48.39	Concord	R15.42	15B	Port Chicago Highway	
Contra Costa; CC 0.00-48.39	Concord	R16.83	17	Willow Pass Road	
Contra Costa; CC 0.00-48.39	Pittsburg	R18.83	19	San Marco Boulevard, Willow Pass Road east – Bay Point	
Contra Costa; CC 0.00-48.39	Pittsburg	R20.10	20	Bailey Road	Signed as exits 20A (south) and 20B (north) eastbound
Contra Costa; CC 0.00-48.39	Pittsburg	23.05	23	Railroad Avenue, Harbor Street	Harbor Street is not signed eastbound
Contra Costa; CC 0.00-48.39	Pittsburg	24.32	24	Loveridge Road – Pittsburg	
Contra Costa; CC 0.00-48.39	Antioch	26.01	26	Somersville Road, Auto Center Drive	
Contra Costa; CC 0.00-48.39	Antioch	26.94	27	L Street, Contra Loma Boulevard	Former exit 27A eastbound
Contra Costa; CC 0.00-48.39	Antioch	27.29	27B	G Street – Central Antioch	Closed; former eastbound exit and westbound entrance
Contra Costa; CC 0.00-48.39	Antioch	R27.79	28	Lone Tree Way, A Street	
Contra Costa; CC 0.00-48.39	Antioch	R28.94	29	Hillcrest Avenue	
Contra Costa; CC 0.00-48.39	Antioch	30.40	30	SR 160 north – Rio Vista, Sacramento	Southern terminus of SR 160; former SR 4 east; west end of bypass
Contra Costa; CC 0.00-48.39	Antioch	R31.38	31	Laurel Road	
Contra Costa; CC 0.00-48.39	Brentwood	R32.99	33	Lone Tree Way	
Contra Costa; CC 0.00-48.39	Brentwood	R34.29	34	Sand Creek Road	
Contra Costa; CC 0.00-48.39	Brentwood	R35.58	35	Balfour Road	
Contra Costa; CC 0.00-48.39	Brentwood		East end of freeway		
Contra Costa; CC 0.00-48.39		R38.01		Marsh Creek Road, Vasco Road – Concord, Livermore	East end of bypass
Contra Costa; CC 0.00-48.39		43.97		Byron Highway, Marsh Creek Road – Brentwood	Byron Highway is former SR 4 west
Contra Costa; CC 0.00-48.39	Byron	R44.37		CR J4 south (Byron Highway) – Byron, Tracy	Northern terminus of CR J4
San Joaquin; SJ 0.00-38.06		5.96		CR J2 south (Tracy Boulevard) – Tracy	Northern terminus of CR J2
San Joaquin; SJ 0.00-38.06	Stockton	15.91 25.36 (Note: Indicates that the postmile represents the distance along I-5 rather than SR 4.)		I-5 south / Dr. Martin Luther King Jr. Boulevard (SR 4 Bus. east) – Tracy, San Francisco, Los Angeles, Angels Camp	Interchange; west end of I-5 overlap; Dr. Martin Luther King Jr. Boulevard is former SR 4 east; formerly Charter Way; SR 4 west follows I-5 exit 471
San Joaquin; SJ 0.00-38.06	Stockton	15.91 25.36	West end of freeway on I-5		
San Joaquin; SJ 0.00-38.06	Stockton	26.19 R16.06	65A	I-5 north / Navy Drive – Sacramento	East end of I-5 overlap; SR 4 east follows I-5 exit 472; Navy Drive serves Port of Stockton
San Joaquin; SJ 0.00-38.06	Stockton	R16.62	66A	El Dorado Street / Center Street – Downtown Stockton	Serves Stockton Arena and Ballpark; eastbound exit via I-5 exit 472
San Joaquin; SJ 0.00-38.06	Stockton	R17.05	66B	Stanislaus Street – Downtown Stockton	Signed as exit 66 eastbound
San Joaquin; SJ 0.00-38.06	Stockton	R17.71	67	Wilson Way (SR 99 Bus.)	Former US 50 / US 99
San Joaquin; SJ 0.00-38.06	Stockton	R18.77	68A	Filbert Street	Signed as exit 68 westbound
San Joaquin; SJ 0.00-38.06	Stockton	R19.44 18.68 (Note: Indicates that the postmile represents the distance along SR 99 rather than SR 4.)	68B	SR 99 north – Sacramento	West end of SR 99 overlap; SR 4 west follows SR 99 exit 254A
San Joaquin; SJ 0.00-38.06	Stockton	18.15	253	Main Street	Closed; former westbound exit only
San Joaquin; SJ 0.00-38.06	Stockton	18.02	253	Dr. Martin Luther King Jr. Boulevard	Closed; former interchange with no westbound exit; currently accessible via Golden Gate Avenue; former SR 26 west; formerly Charter Way
San Joaquin; SJ 0.00-38.06		17.50 S19.68	East end of freeway on SR 99		
San Joaquin; SJ 0.00-38.06		17.50 S19.68		SR 99 south / Golden Gate Avenue / Dr. Martin Luther King Jr. Boulevard – Fresno	Interchange; east end of SR 99 overlap; SR 4 east follows SR 99 exit 252B
San Joaquin; SJ 0.00-38.06		S19.98		Farmington Road (SR 4 Bus. west)	Former SR 4 west
San Joaquin; SJ 0.00-38.06		24.87		CR J5 (Jack Tone Road) – Lockeford, Ripon	
San Joaquin; SJ 0.00-38.06	Farmington	33.10		CR J6 (Escalon-Bellota Road) – Escalon	
Stanislaus; STA 0.00-8.89		4.54		CR J14 (Milton Road) – Milton, Eugene	
Calaveras; CAL R0.00-R65.87	Copperopolis	R8.14		CR E15 south (O'Byrnes Ferry Road) / Rock Creek Road – Copperopolis	Northern terminus of CR E15
Calaveras; CAL R0.00-R65.87	Angels Camp	R21.09		SR 49 / SR 4 Bus. east – San Andreas, Sonora	Former SR 4 east; west end of bypass
Calaveras; CAL R0.00-R65.87		R23.00		SR 4 Bus. west – Angels Camp, Sonora	Former SR 4 west; east end of bypass
Calaveras; CAL R0.00-R65.87	Vallecito	26.22		CR E18 south (Parrotts Ferry Road) – Moaning Cavern	Northern terminus of CR E18
Calaveras; CAL R0.00-R65.87	Murphys	29.70	Weigh station (westbound only)		
Alpine; ALP R0.00-31.68		R2.91		SR 207 north (Mount Reba Road) – Bear Valley Ski Area	Southern terminus of SR 207
Alpine; ALP R0.00-31.68	Lake Alpine East Shore	4.63	Eastbound winter closure gate		
Alpine; ALP R0.00-31.68		18.56	Ebbetts Pass (closed in winters), elevation 8,730 feet (2,660 m)		
Alpine; ALP R0.00-31.68		31.68	Westbound winter closure gate		
Alpine; ALP R0.00-31.68		31.68		SR 89 to US 395 – Markleeville, Monitor Pass	East end of SR 4; SR 89 south through Monitor Pass closed in winters
1.000 mi = 1.609 km; 1.000 km = 0.621 mi: Closed/former; Concurrency terminus; Incomplete access

== Angels Camp business route ==
State Route 4 Business
- Location: Angels Camp, California
- Existed: 2013–present

State Route 4 Business (SR 4 Bus.) is a locally maintained business loop within the city of Angels Camp, California. It was established in August 2013 to attract customers to businesses along the parent route's former alignment, prior to the completion of the Angels Camp Bypass. It runs along South Main Street (co-signed with State Route 49), between State Route 4 and Vallecito Road, then turns east along Vallecito Road.

Major intersections

The entire route is in Calaveras County.

Location	mi	km	Destinations	Notes
Angels Camp	0.0	0.0	SR 49 north (Main Street) – San Andreas, Jackson	Continuation beyond SR 4
Angels Camp	0.0	0.0	SR 4 – Stockton, Murphys	Western terminus; west end of SR 49 overlap
Angels Camp	1.5	2.4	SR 49 south (Main Street) – Sonora	East end of SR 49 overlap; left turn prohibited westbound for buses or motorcoaches over 40 feet (12 m) long
	2.6	4.2	SR 4 – Murphys, Arnold, Bear Valley	Eastern terminus
1.000 mi = 1.609 km; 1.000 km = 0.621 mi: Concurrency terminus

== SR-4/I-680 interchange improvements ==
On February 1, 2019, the Brentwood Press newspaper reported that officials representing the Contra Costa Transportation Authority (CCTA) and the California Department of Transportation (Caltrans) had held a groundbreaking ceremony to start a project that is intended to reduce congestion at the SR 4/I-680 interchange just outside Martinez. The multiphase project will widen SR 4 by adding a third lane in each direction, beginning at Morello Avenue in Martinez and ending at the merge of SR 4 and SR 242. (Note: The Caltrans representative noted that the interchange currently handles more than 100,000 cars per day.) It will also include replacing the 50-year-old Grayson Creek Bridge, which has outlived its serviceable life and does not meet current bridge safety codes. The project will impact about 4 miles (6.4 km) of SR 4. Although no schedule or end date has been announced, the officials said that the estimated cost is about $136 million (in 2018 dollars).
