= Royal Gorge =

Canyon of the Arkansas River in Colorado, US

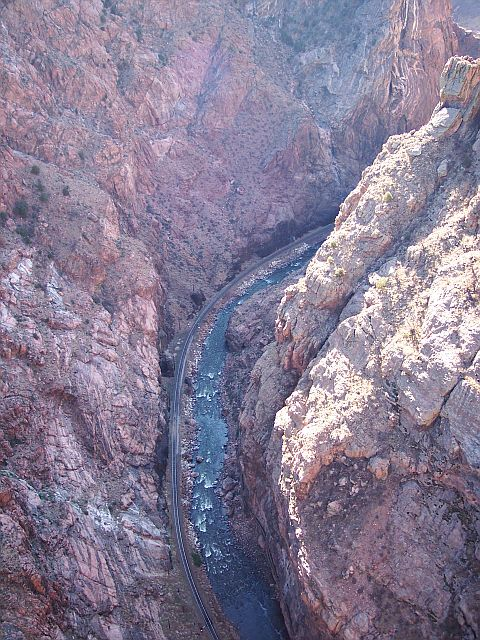

- Location within Colorado
- Length: 6 miles (9.7 km)
- Width: 50 feet (15 m) (base); 300 feet (91 m) (top)
- Depth: 1,250 feet (380 m)

Geology
- Type: canyon

Geography
- Location: near Cañon City
- Coordinates: 38°27′25″N 105°19′02″W
- Rivers: Arkansas River
- Interactive map of Royal Gorge

The Royal Gorge is a canyon of the Arkansas River located west of Cañon City, Colorado. The canyon begins at the mouth of Grape Creek, about 2 mi (3.2 km) west of central Cañon City, and continues in a west-northwesterly direction for approximately 6 mi (9.7 km) until ending near U.S. Route 50. Being one of the deepest canyons in Colorado, it is also known as the Grand Canyon of the Arkansas (River), with a maximum depth of 1,250 ft (380 m). The canyon is also very narrow, measuring from 50 ft (15 m) wide at its base to 300 ft (91 m) wide at its top, as it carves a path through the granite formations below Fremont Peak and YMCA Mountain, which rise above the north and south rims, respectively.

== Natural history ==
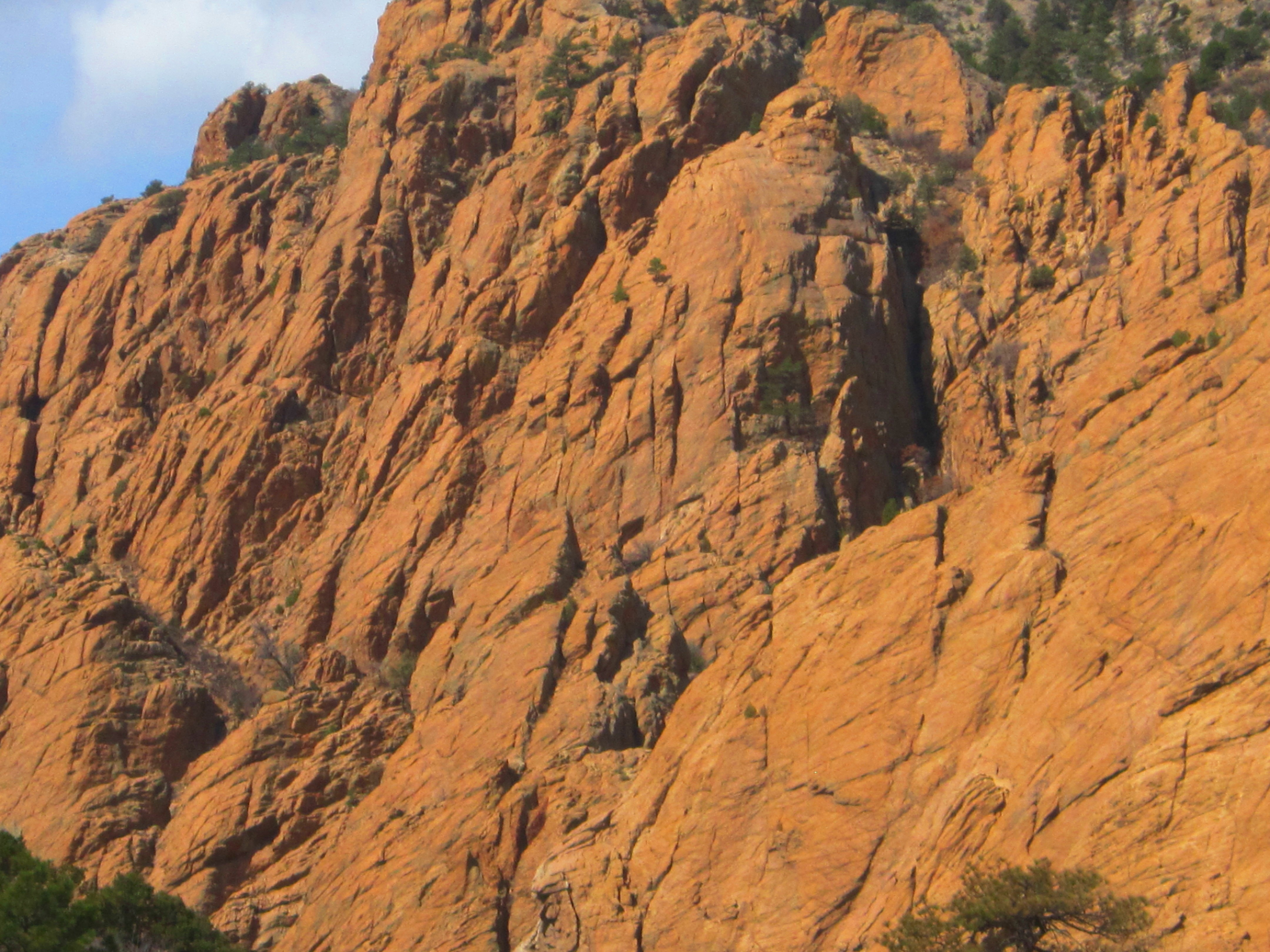
The wall of Royal Gorge

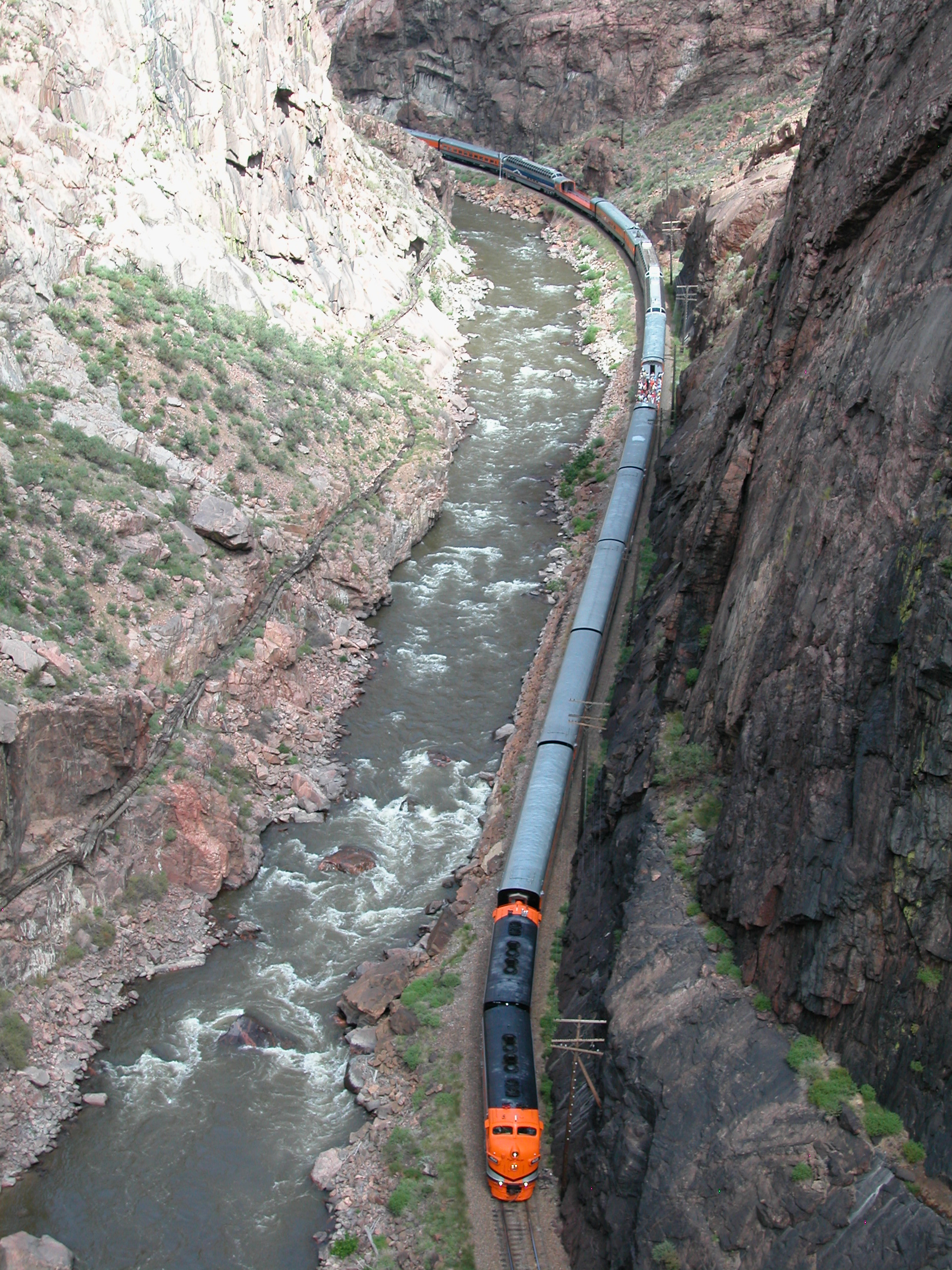
A view of the Royal Gorge Route Railroad

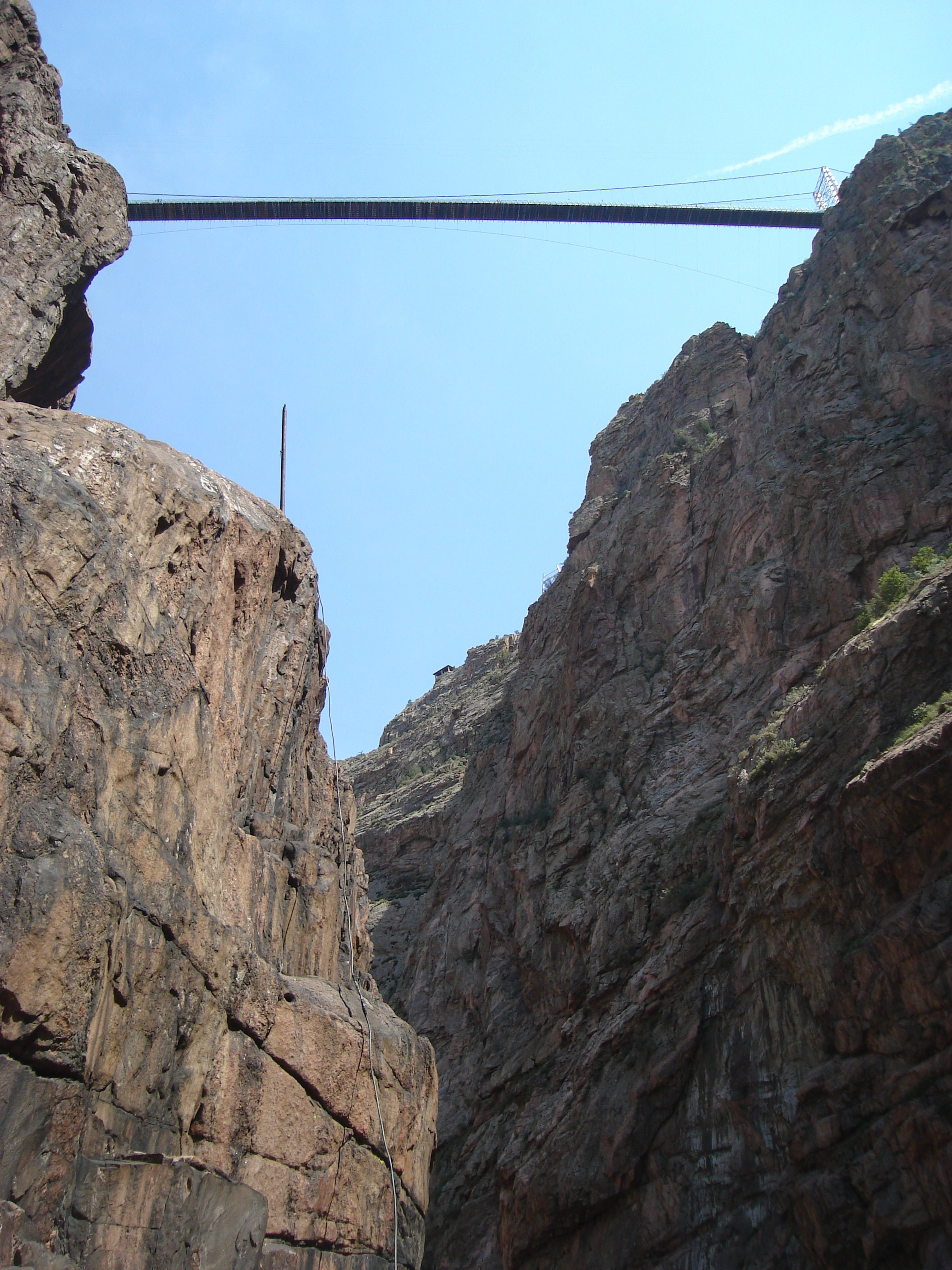
A view of the Royal Gorge Bridge, from below

The path of the Arkansas River was already set when the granite uplift that would eventually form the Rocky Mountains began. About 3 million years ago, as the mountains began to rise from the surrounding plains, the Arkansas River—then only a small stream—began to wear away at the stone it flowed across. Scientists estimate that the mountains surrounding the canyon rose at a rate of approximately one foot every 2500 years. Over the millennia, this small stream grew, cutting a deep channel for itself through the surrounding granite. The gorge's peculiar shape, contrasted to broad canyons such as the Grand Canyon, can be attributed to this long, direct erosion through hard rock.

== Early history and European settlement ==
Before European settlement, Native Americans of the Ute people wintered in Royal Gorge for its protection from wind and its relatively mild climate. The Comanche, Kiowa, Sioux and Cheyenne used Royal Gorge on buffalo hunting expeditions as an access point to mountain meadow regions such as South Park Basin. Colorado's Rocky Mountain region fell under Spanish claims, and conquistador expeditions of the 17th century or fur traders may have seen Royal Gorge in their traversal of the area. The first recorded instance of a European arrival, however, is the Pike Expedition of 1806. Zebulon Pike's group built a crude shelter in the gorge and explored the area, descending on horseback over the frozen Arkansas River.

Nearby Cañon City was founded in 1860 to exploit possible mineral deposits in the area. Discovery of silver and lead near Leadville in 1877 prompted a race to build rail access to the area. Royal Gorge was a bottleneck along the Arkansas too narrow for both the Atchison, Topeka and Santa Fe Railway and the Denver and Rio Grande Railroad to pass through, and there was no other reasonable access to the South Park area. Both railroads thus took to fighting the "Royal Gorge Railroad War", two years of essentially low-level guerrilla warfare between the two companies. Federal intervention prompted the so-called "Treaty of Boston" to end the struggle. The D&RGW completed its line and leased it for use by the Santa Fe.

In the 1890s Royal Gorge was used as a passenger route for transcontinental rail travel. As many as four trains per day went through the gorge, though in time the establishment of alternate routes through the mountains made the Royal Gorge fall from favor for transcontinental use, and passenger train service on the main line was discontinued in 1967. A sightseeing train now follows the route through the gorge.

== Modern history ==
On May 7, 1879, the first excursion train traveled through the Royal Gorge after years of court battles between the Denver & Rio Grande and the Atchison, Topeka & Santa Fe (AT&SF or Santa Fe) railroads.

The Royal Gorge Route Railroad now operates excursion trains through the Royal Gorge throughout the year. The train travels 11 miles through the canyon from Cañon City, Colorado to the caretaker's house.

In 1906 Guy U. Hardy, a local newspaper editor and future Congressman, lobbied to establish an 8-mile (13 km) park at Royal Gorge by having the land ceded to the City of Cañon City. Royal Gorge Park was then created.

In 1929 Cañon City authorized the building of the Royal Gorge Bridge, which at 955 feet (291 m) above the river held the record of highest bridge in the world from 1929 to 2001. The bridge is the centerpiece of Royal Gorge Bridge and Park, an amusement park with rides and attractions on both sides of the gorge. The land and bridge are owned by the city and leased to a Dallas-based company called the Royal Gorge Bridge Company which has held the leasing rights since 1947. Another Dallas-based company called Leisure and Recreational Concepts was hired by the Royal Gorge Bridge Company in 1984 to handle daily operations of the park.

In the movie Sensations of 1945, Hubert Castle plays the role of Olaf, “The Great Gustafson,” who performs a high-wire publicity stunt above the canyon. It is notable that Cañon City’s own Bird Millman never did attempt such a feat herself.

In 1948, images from the park appeared in Canon City (film), which is based on the true story of a prison break.

In 1955, portions of the film Big House, U.S.A., starring Broderick Crawford, Ralph Meeker, Lon Chaney Jr., William Talman, Charles Bronson and Felicia Farr (credited as Randy Farr), were filmed in Royal Gorge Park and Cañon City.

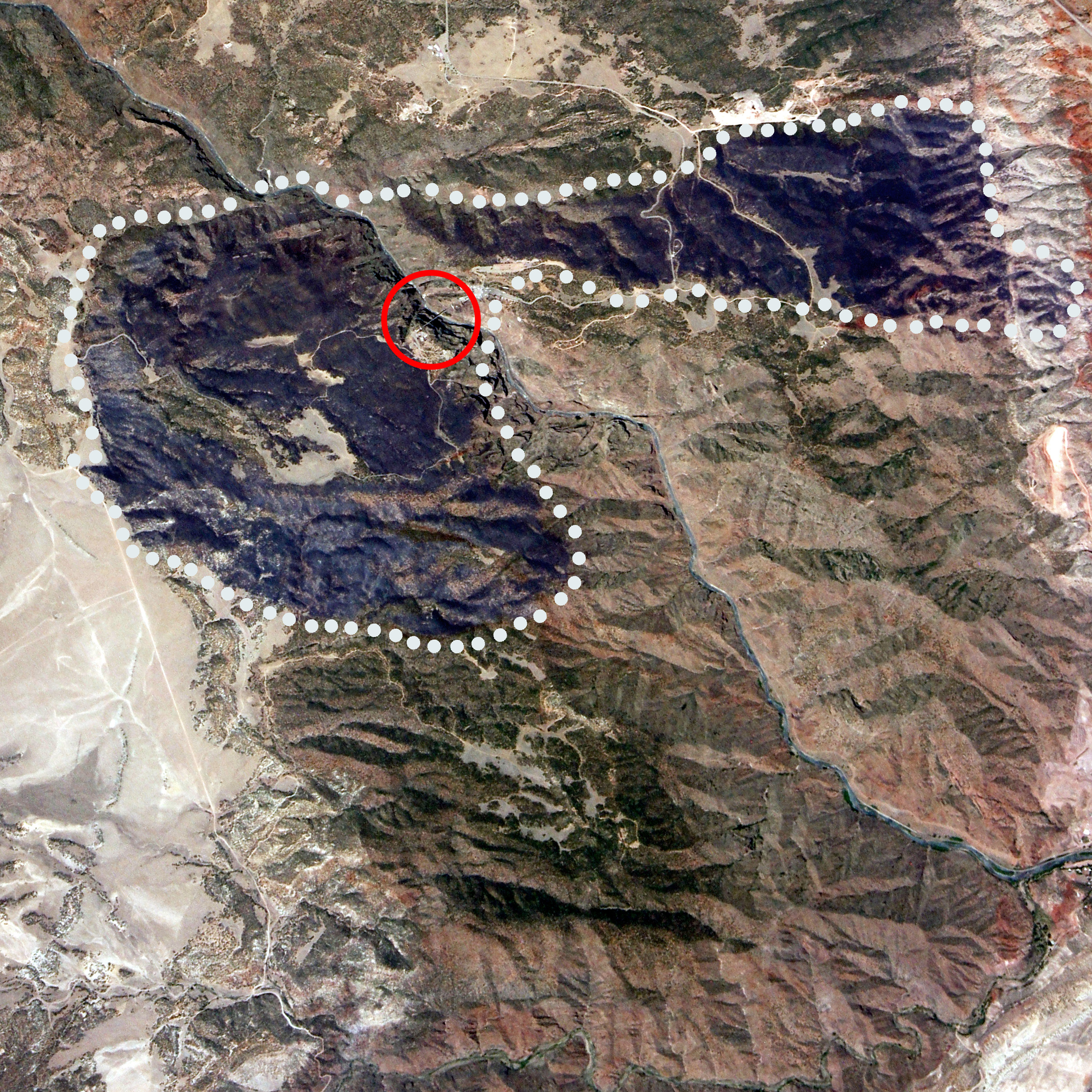
ISS image of burn scars with bridge circled in red

On June 11, 2013, a wildfire broke out near the Royal Gorge Bridge and Park which ultimately destroyed 48 of 52 buildings in the park on both sides of the gorge. The bridge was only lightly damaged, with some scorched planks requiring replacement. The park was rebuilt and opened once again on August 30, 2014.

In the summer months, rafting is a very popular activity in the Royal Gorge. Tourists travel from around the world to tackle the Class IV rapids of the Arkansas River and enjoy the scenery of the gorge. Named rapids in the gorge include Sunshine Falls, Sledgehammer, Wallslammer, Corkscrew, the Narrows, Boateater and Soda Pop Rock. River recreation in the gorge is regulated by the Arkansas Headwaters Recreation Area (AHRA) and daily user fees are required to launch at all of the recreation sites upstream of the gorge. There are many commercial rafting companies which are licensed by the AHRA to run the gorge and summer weekends can see hundreds of rafts packing the river.

BASE jumping, bungee jumping and rock climbing are generally not permitted at the Royal Gorge. Occasionally, during special events such as the GoFast Games, bridge jumps have been allowed by the city and the lessee of the bridge and park.

The cost of admission has increased over the years. In 2025, the price was USD35 for adults, USD30 for age 3 to 11.

== Gallery ==
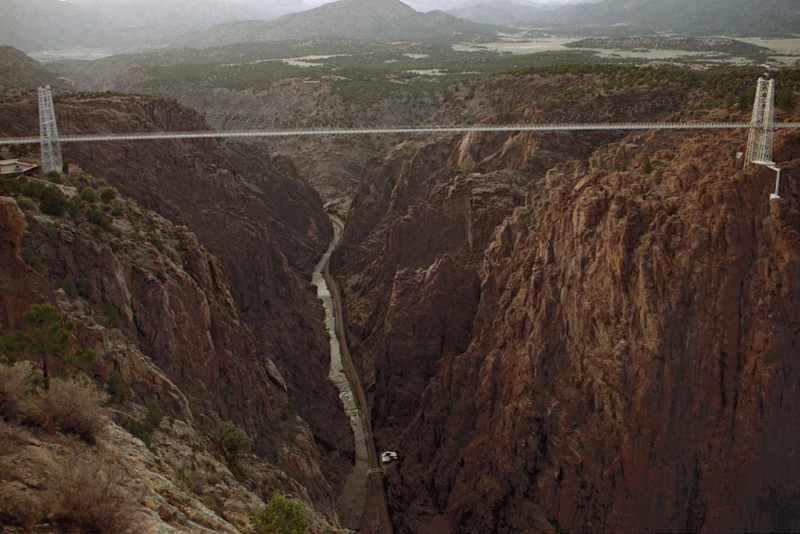
Gorge and bridge from south rim

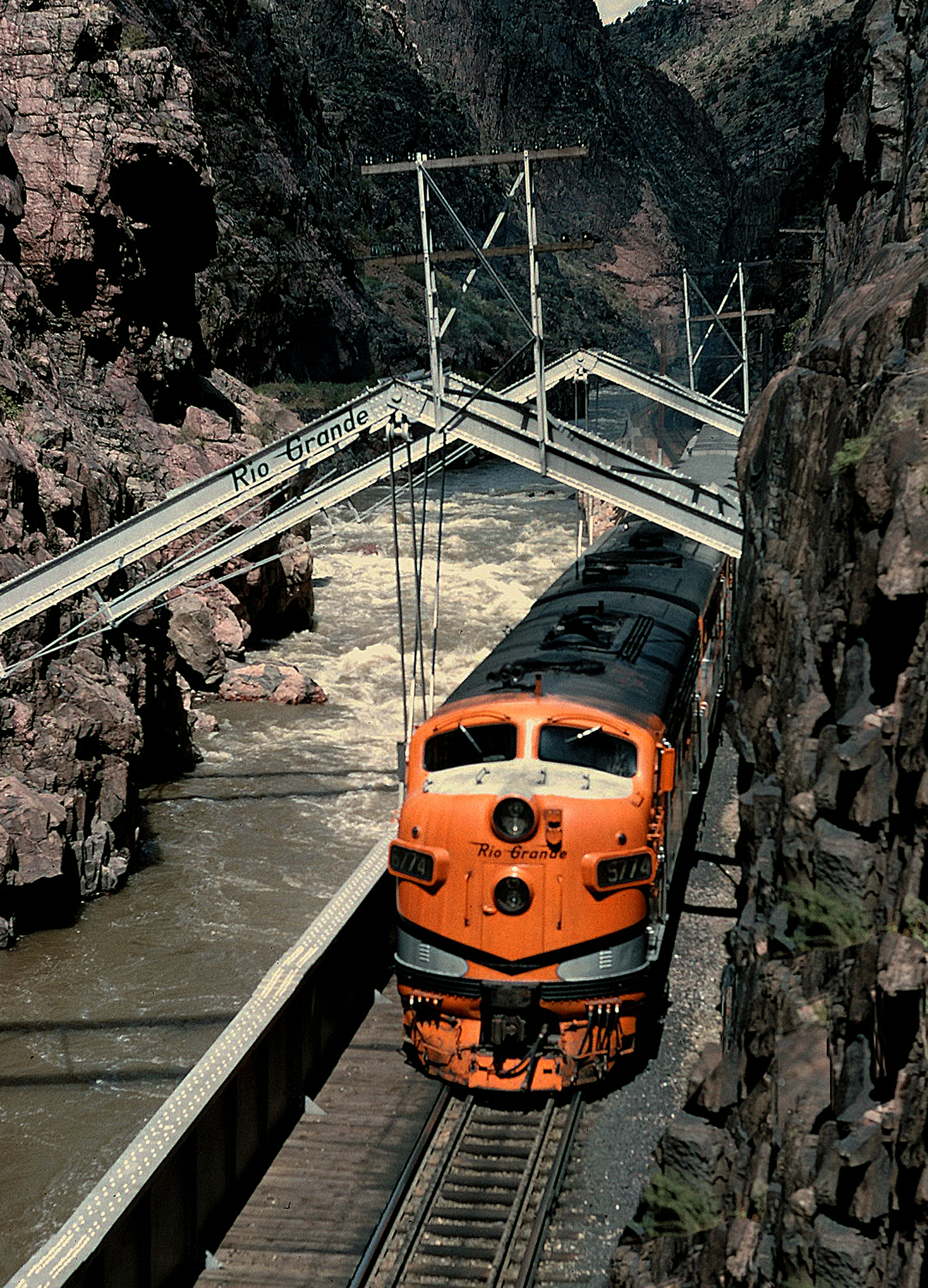
Train and Hanging Bridge

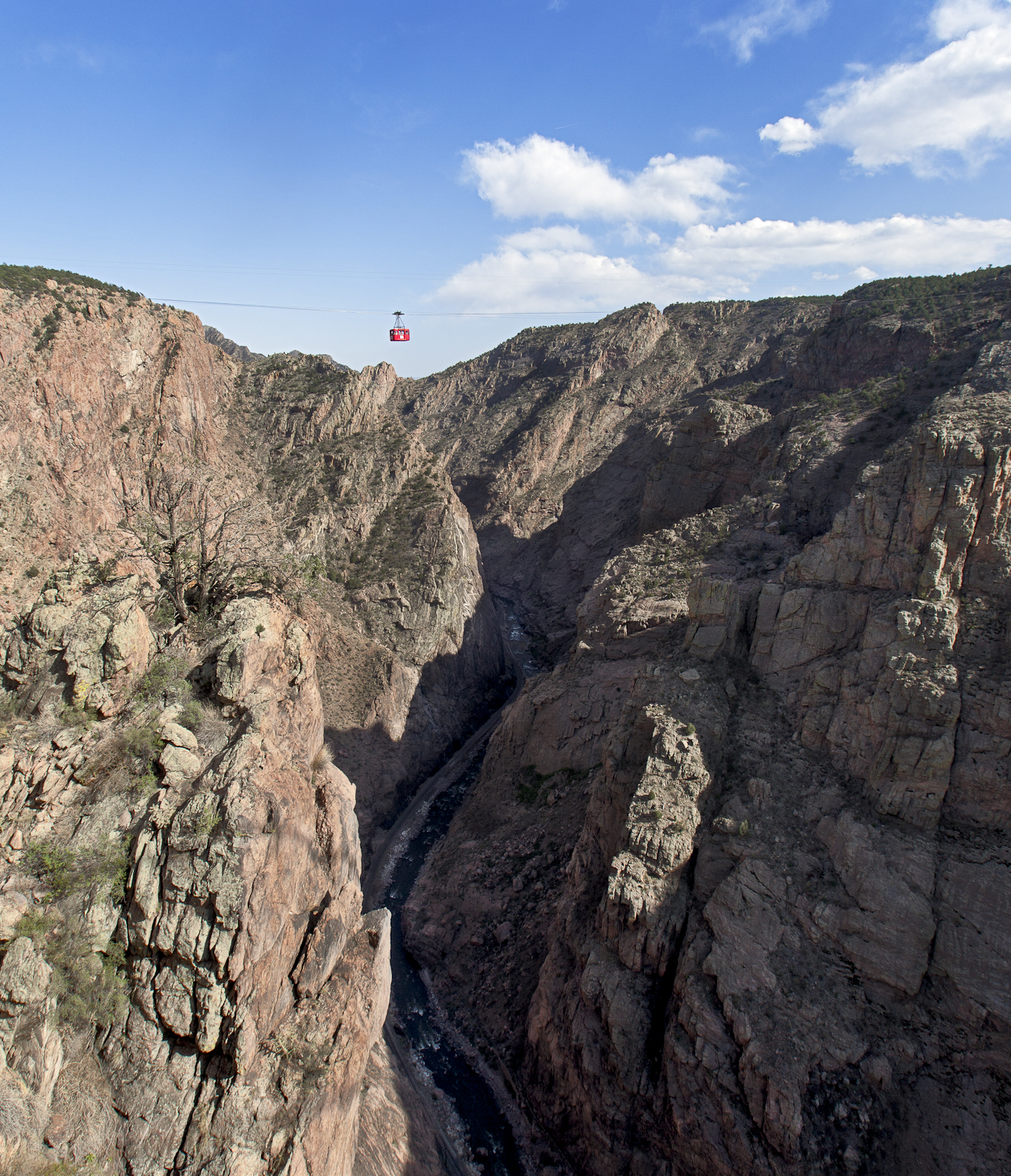
Looking east from bridge

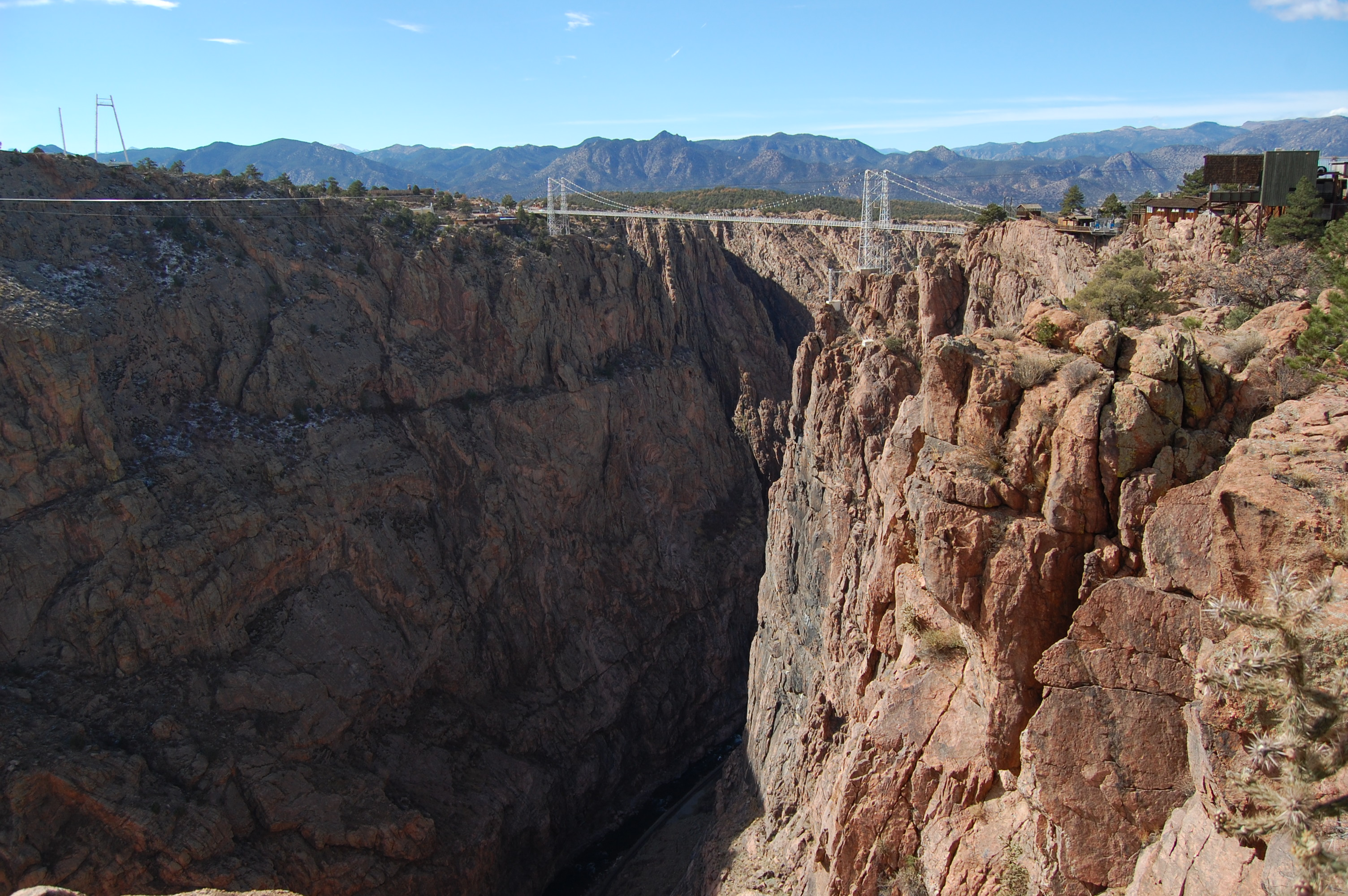
Gorge and bridge from north rim
