= Ebbetts Pass Granodiorite =

Geologic formation in Alpine County, California

The Ebbetts Pass Granodiorite is a Late Cretaceous intrusive igneous rock unit located in Alpine County, California. It forms part of the Sierra Nevada batholith and is prominently exposed near Ebbetts Pass. It was first described in 1957 as a distinct granodioritic body within the Sierra Nevada region. Subsequent studies have provided more detailed insights into its age, composition, and structural characteristics.

== Geologic Overview ==
Radiometric dating using the potassium-argon (K-Ar) method has yielded ages 88.3 and 94.6 million years, placing its age in the Late Cretaceous period. The granodiorite is typically fine- to medium-grained and composed predominantly of biotite and hornblende. Textural variations are common, with occurrences of coarse-grained porphyritic types. Accessory minerals include quartz, alkali feldspar, muscovite, and minor amounts of magnetite and ilmenite. Dark hornblende-rich inclusions, dikes composed primarily of quartz and feldspar minerals, and small aplite and pegmatite bodies are found throughout the pluton.

=== Structural Features ===
Field studies have identified steeply dipping magmatic foliations within the Ebbetts Pass Granodiorite, generally striking southwest. A secondary northwest-striking magmatic foliation is also commonly observed. These structural features suggest a complex history involving multiple magmatic events and interactions with surrounding rock units.
