= Vasco Road =

Road in California

- Maintained by: Alameda County, Contra Costa County
- Length: 17.7 mi (28.5 km)
- South end: CR J2 / Tesla Road in Livermore
- Major junctions: I-580 in Livermore
- North end: SR 4 in Brentwood

Construction
- Inauguration: 1958

Vasco Road is a roadway over the Diablo Range that connects Livermore and Brentwood, California. Although it is not part of the California State Highway system, it is the principal north–south commuter route serving eastern Alameda and Contra Costa counties. The two counties are each responsible for maintaining the portion of the road within their boundaries.

The traffic count in 2008 was estimated at more than 25,000 vehicles per day. Weekend traffic is also heavy in spring and summer, when residents from other parts of California flock to the recreation areas along the Sacramento - San Joaquin River Delta.

== History ==
Originally, Vasco Road was a two-lane, very narrow road that began at U.S. Highway 50 (now Interstate 580) and wound over the Diablo Range and through the Kellogg Creek valley. In 1957, Alameda County linked three other streets inside Livermore to extend Vasco to Tesla Road. A ribbon-cutting ceremony opened the new Vasco Road on August 1, 1958.

Booming population growth caused a sharp increase in housing prices throughout the Bay Area. People working in Silicon Valley and the Tri-Valley areas began moving into the relatively undeveloped East County area of Contra Costa County. By the early 1990s, traffic congestion on Vasco Road had become severe and accidents were frequent.

In 1996, concurrently with the construction of Los Vaqueros Reservoir, a 12.8-mile (20.6 km) segment of Vasco was relocated and widened to accommodate increased traffic and heavy trucks. The old roadway was submerged by the reservoir. When the road re-opened, it carried about 16,000 vehicles per day. In 2009, Vasco Road was extended northwestward from Walnut Street to Marsh Creek Road, where it joined the third segment of John Marsh Heritage Highway (California State Route 4 Bypass, now part of California State Route 4). In 2010, a section of the road in Alameda County was relocated and widened, eliminating a steep narrow section with several switchbacks.

=== Safety issues ===
As originally constructed, Vasco Road was unprepared to meet the demands of high-volume traffic. Blind curves, narrow lanes, steep hills and inadequate shoulders all contributed to the increasing number of accidents. Some of these issues remained even after the relocation and reconstruction of much of the road. Many of these accidents were fatal, head-on collisions. A 2004 engineering study reported that there had been 254 collisions between May 1996 through August 2003.

The engineering firm that performed the safety report considered the feasibility of installing a concrete barrier down the center median. This proposal was rejected because of the high cost, as well as objections by some county agencies about lack of adequate access to emergencies. As an alternative, the engineers recommended that Contra Costa County install "rumble strips" from Walnut Boulevard to the Alameda county line. These are roughened strips of asphalt placed down the center line and the sides of each lane, intended to alert drivers when they stray off the road or into the oncoming traffic lane. This alternative was implemented by the county, along with adding "Do Not Pass" and "Passing Lane Ahead" signs at appropriate places.

In August 2006, former Governor Arnold Schwarzenegger signed SB 3 into law, establishing a "double fine" section on Vasco Road from Walnut Boulevard in Brentwood to Interstate 580 in Livermore. The law doubled the fines for "unlawful passing and overtaking, excessive speed, reckless driving, drunken driving and other serious moving violations" until Jan. 1, 2010. However, road signs declaring the double fine zone were still up as of June 2016.

Contra Costa County began a project in 2010 to install a median barrier along a one-mile stretch of the road. This also required widening the roadway and a bridge, building retaining walls, and extending a passing lane.

== Major intersections ==
| County | Location | mi | km | Destinations | Notes |
|---|---|---|---|---|---|
| Alameda | Livermore | 0 | 0.0 | CR J2 (Tesla Road) | South end of Vasco Road |
| Alameda | Livermore | 2.9 | 4.7 | I-580 east – Stockton | Grade-separated interchange |
| Alameda | Livermore | 3.2 | 5.1 | I-580 west – Oakland | Grade-separated interchange |
| Contra Costa | | 17.4 | 28.0 | Camino Diablo – Byron | |
| Contra Costa | | 19.6 | 31.5 | Walnut Boulevard – Brentwood | To SR 4 east |
| Contra Costa | Brentwood | 20.7 | 33.3 | SR 4 east (Marsh Creek Road) – Stockton | North end of Vasco Road |
| Contra Costa | Brentwood | 20.7 | 33.3 | SR 4 west (John Marsh Heritage Highway) – Martinez | Continuation beyond Vasco Road |
1.000 mi = 1.609 km; 1.000 km = 0.621 mi

== Attractions ==
- Altamont Pass Wind Farm (not open to the public)
- Brushy Peak Regional Preserve, part of both the East Bay Regional Park District and the Livermore Area Recreation and Park District (LARPD).
- John Marsh House. Currently under restoration and not open to the public.
- Los Vaqueros Reservoir, with vehicular access to both northern and southern ends.
- Vasco Caves, part of East Bay Regional Park District. Wildlife and animal refuge part of the park is open for the public. Co-located Native American archeological site with wall paintings is not accessible to the public.

== See also ==
- Vasco Caves Regional Preserve — on Vasco Road.
