= Ebbetts Pass =

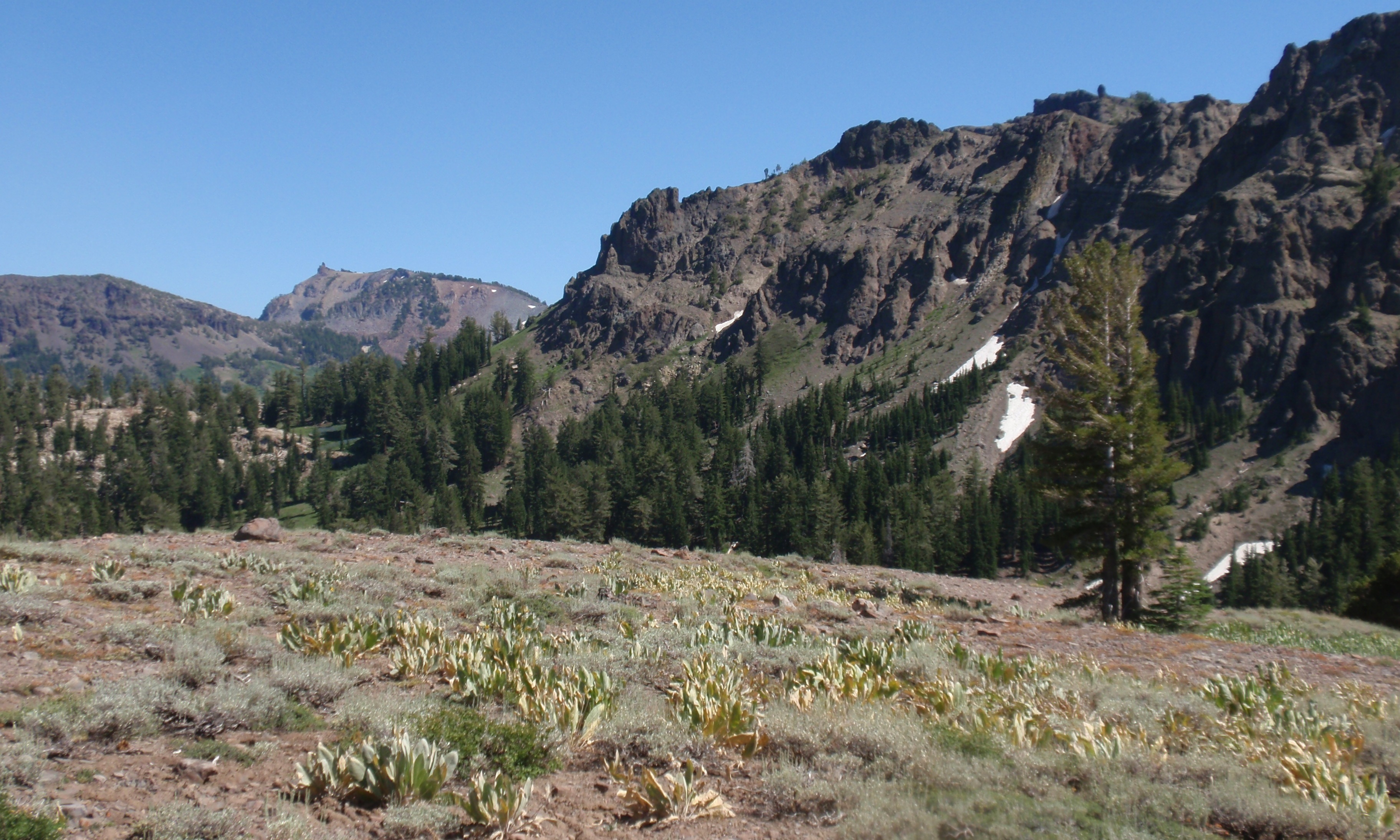
- Subalpine meadow at Ebbetts Pass

- Location within California
- Elevation: 8,736 feet (2,663 m) NAVD 88
- Traversed by: SR 4

Third Approach
- Location: Alpine County, California, U.S.
- Range: Sierra Nevada
- Coordinates: 38°32′40″N 119°48′43″W

California Historical Landmark
- Reference no.: 318

Ebbetts Pass (el. 8,736 ft or 2,663 m), named after John Ebbetts, is a high mountain pass through the Sierra Nevada range in Alpine County, California. Ebbetts is the eastern of two passes in the area traversed by State Route 4. The western pass is the Pacific Grade Summit (el 8,050 ft or 2,450 m). The pass is registered as a California Historical Landmark. The Pacific Crest Trail, a 2,650-mile (4,260 km) long National Scenic Trail crosses State Route 4 at Ebbetts Pass.

== History ==
Native Americans were undoubtedly the first humans to traverse the Sierra Nevada Mountains, but it is unknown if they regularly used Ebbetts Pass since any trail they would have used is no longer traceable. It is traditionally held to be the pass used by Jedediah Smith in late spring of 1827 when leaving California at the end of his first exploratory journey, the first crossing ever of the Sierra Nevada by a non-native, but snow would have obscured any trail so he was blazing his own path. It may also have been used by the Bartleson–Bidwell Party on their emigration to California.

John Ebbetts, a fur trader turned guide for California Gold Rush "Forty-niners" claimed to have led a string of pack mules easterly over the Sierras in the vicinity of Ebbetts Pass in April 1851. He believed the pass he had used would be suitable for the transcontinental railroad, as he noted little snow at the time. He later surveyed near the pass for a possible railroad route, but found it unsuitable. He intended to return to the pass itself to survey it for a road but was killed in the explosion of the steamboat Secretary on San Pablo Bay in 1854 before he could do so. While the pass was referred to by his name earlier, it was not until 1893, when the U.S. Geological Survey surveyed the Markleeville quadrangle, that the pass was officially named after him.

The route was used only occasionally until silver was discovered east of the Sierra, and merchants in Murphys had a road constructed to Markleeville to more easily transport supplies over the pass to the miners. This became a toll road in 1862. From Markleeville, travel further eastward was taken along established routes.

It was not until the early 1950s that the road over Monitor Pass to U.S. Route 395 was completed, connecting the eastern terminus of State Route 4 to U.S. Route 395 via State Route 89 near the community of Topaz.

Ebbetts Pass was designated as a California State Scenic Highway in 1971; it was similarly honored with National Scenic Byway status on September 22, 2005. It is one of only seven nationally so-designated byways in California, and of 151 in the entire nation.

== Current usage ==
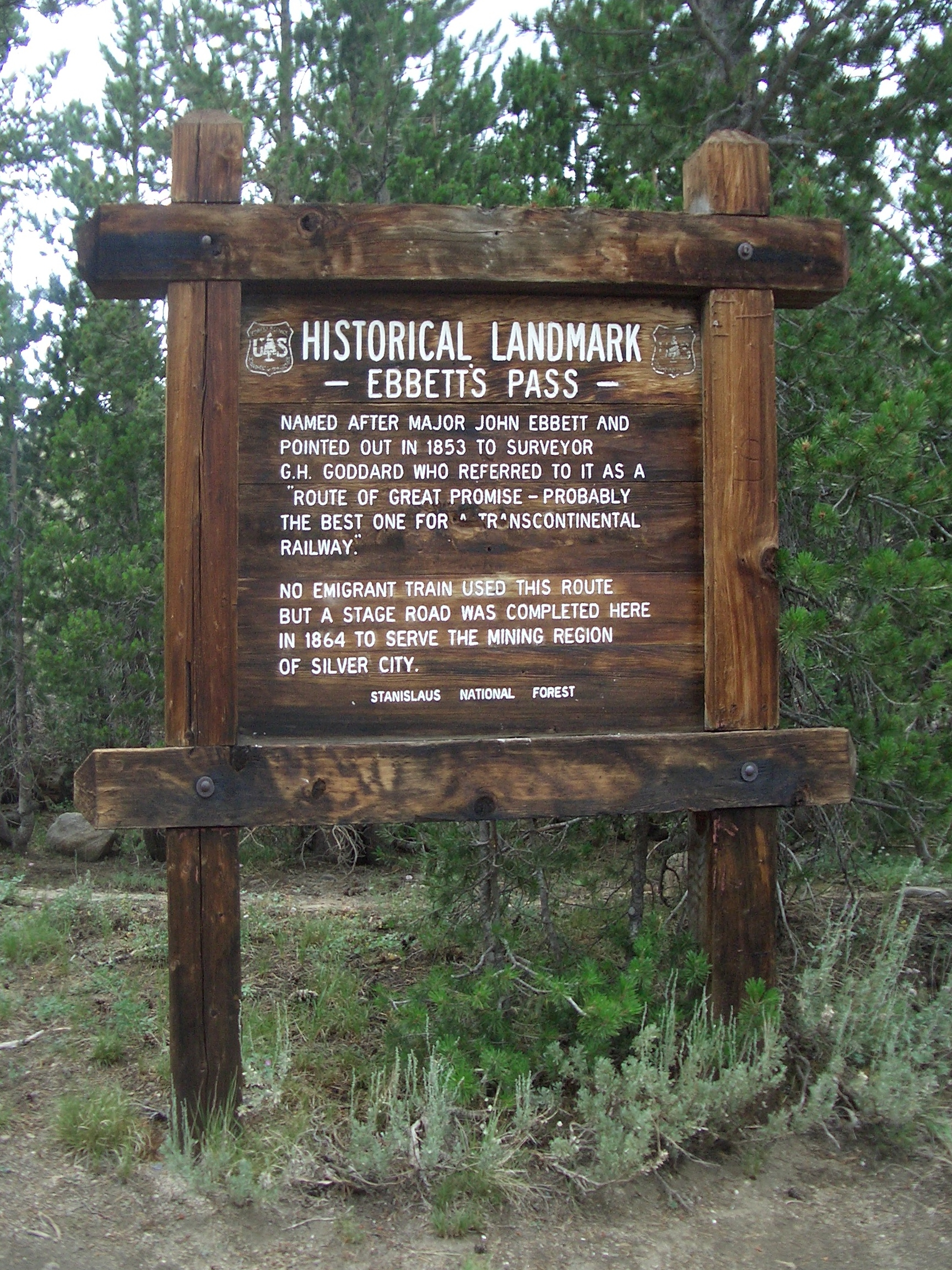
Historical marker at Ebbetts Pass

Today, Ebbetts Pass is one of the least traveled passes in the Sierra Nevada. A 23-mile stretch between Lake Alpine and Centerville Flat is less than two lanes, and lacks a dividing line between them. It has very steep sections with hairpin corners. The eastern slope is particularly difficult, as many of the hairpin corners are blind, and steepen suddenly at the apex, making it necessary to shift to first gear in most vehicles. It is rarely used by commercial traffic and is not recommended for vehicles towing long trailers. Furthermore, the pass closes during the winter months, often from November through as late as May.

== Geology ==
The pass is the namesake of Ebbetts Pass Granodiorite, a Late Cretaceous rock unit that was identified in 1957 in a geologic survey of the mountain pass.

== Climate ==
According to the Köppen Climate Classification system, Ebbetts Pass has a dry-summer subarctic climate, abbreviated "Dsc" on climate maps. While snowfall totals aren’t measured, roughly 400+ inches of snow fall on average annually.

Climate data for Ebbetts Pass, California
Month	Jan	Feb	Mar	Apr	May	Jun	Jul	Aug	Sep	Oct	Nov	Dec	Year
Mean daily maximum °F (°C)	36 (2)	36 (2)	39 (4)	44 (7)	51 (11)	61 (16)	69 (21)	68 (20)	63 (17)	53 (12)	42 (6)	35 (2)	50 (10)
Mean daily minimum °F (°C)	19 (−7)	18 (−8)	20 (−7)	23 (−5)	31 (−1)	40 (4)	48 (9)	47 (8)	41 (5)	32 (0)	24 (−4)	18 (−8)	30 (−1)
Average precipitation inches (mm)	9.30 (236)	8.29 (211)	7.70 (196)	4.71 (120)	2.93 (74)	1.05 (27)	0.59 (15)	0.50 (13)	0.89 (23)	3.08 (78)	5.27 (134)	9.21 (234)	53.52 (1,361)
Average extreme snow depth inches (cm)	74 (190)	88 (220)	101 (260)	87 (220)	58 (150)	19 (48)	0 (0)	0 (0)	0 (0)	6 (15)	23 (58)	52 (130)	109 (280)
Average precipitation days (≥ 0.01 in)	12.6	13.0	13.3	12.6	9.1	4.0	2.4	1.9	3.7	6.6	10.2	13.2	102.6
Source: XMACIS2
