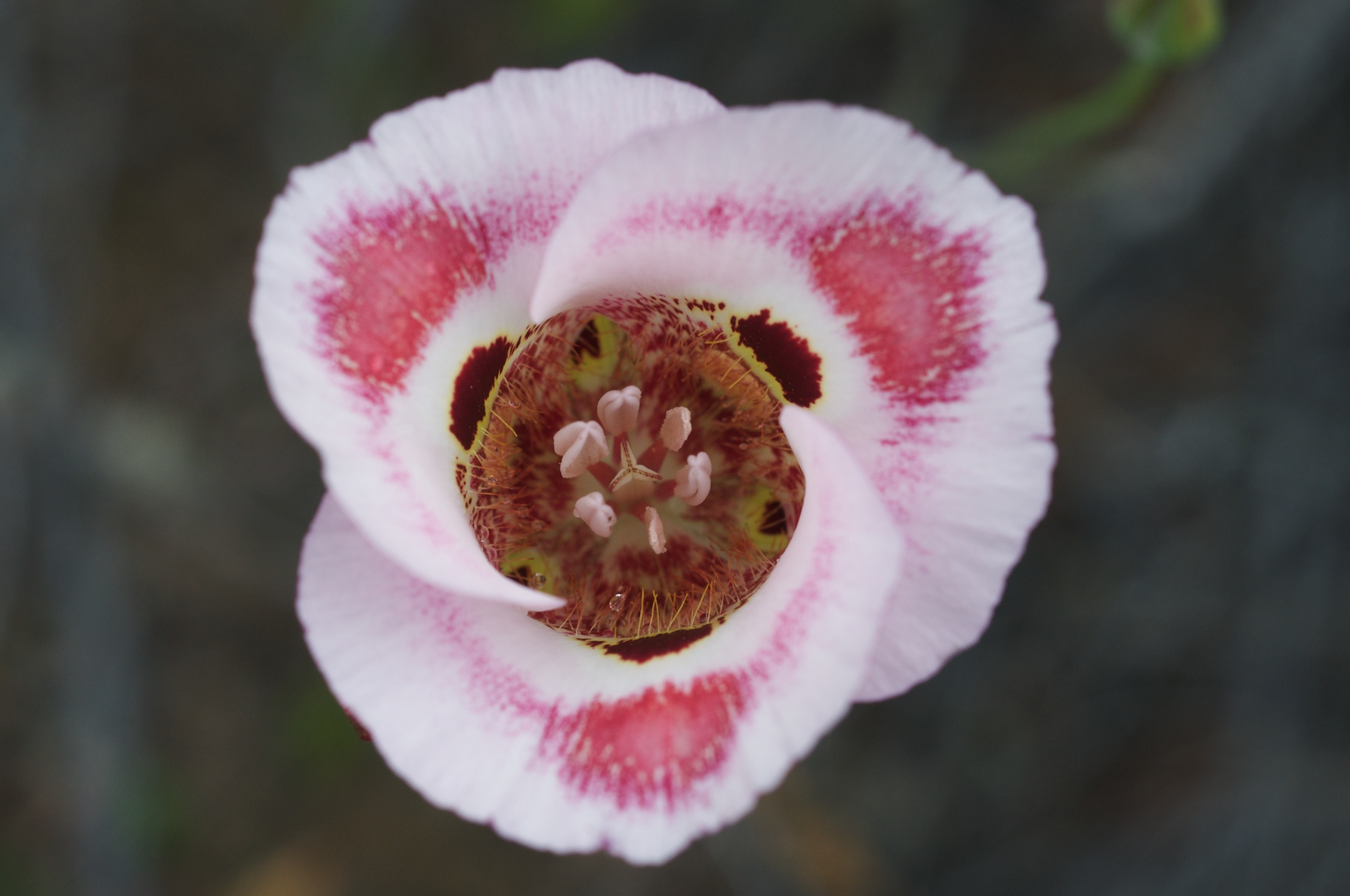

Scientific classification
- Kingdom: Plantae
- Clade: Tracheophytes
- Clade: Angiosperms
- Clade: Monocots
- Order: Liliales
- Family: Liliaceae
- Genus: Calochortus
- Species: C. venustus

Binomial name
- Calochortus venustus Dougl. ex Benth.

Synonyms
- Synonymy: Mariposa venusta (Douglas ex Benth.) Hoover; Calochortus venustus var. roseus Reuthe; Calochortus venustus var. purpureus Baker; Calochortus venustus var. purpurascens S.Watson; Calochortus venustus var. oculatus Tubergen; Calochortus venustus pictus Wallace; Calochortus venustus var. pictus (Wallace) Purdy & L.H.Bailey; Calochortus venustus var. sanguineus Purdy & L.H.Bailey; Calochortus venustus var. eldorado Purdy; Calochortus venustus var. sulphureus Purdy; Calochortus venustus var. caroli Cockerell; Calochortus venustus var. superbus L.H.Bailey & E.Z.Bailey

= Calochortus venustus =

Species of flowering plant

Calochortus venustus is a California species of flowering plants in the lily family known by the common name butterfly mariposa lily. It is a perennial herb that grows in grasslands and open wooded areas.

== Distribution and habitat ==
The species is endemic to California ranging from Shasta County to San Diego County, particularly common in the San Gabriel Mountains, the southern part of the Sierra Nevada, and the Coast Ranges between Oakland and Los Angeles. It thrives in the light, sandy soils of a number of habitats, both grasslands and open wooded areas, at 300–2,700 metres (980–8,860 ft) in altitude.

== Description ==
Calochortus venustus is a perennial herb producing a branching stem 10 to 60 centimetres tall. There is a basal leaf up to 20 centimetres long which withers by the time the plant blooms.

The inflorescence is a loose cluster of 1 to 6 erect, bell-shaped flowers. The flowers are variable in size and palette; they are often showy and intricately patterned. The petals may be a variety of colours from white to pale pink or purple to bright red or orange, sporting a large dark central blotch and a smaller, paler blotch above. They generally have three curving sepals 2 or 3 centimetres long and three oval-shaped, clawed petals up to 5 centimetres long.

The fruit is an angled capsule 5 or 6 centimetres long.

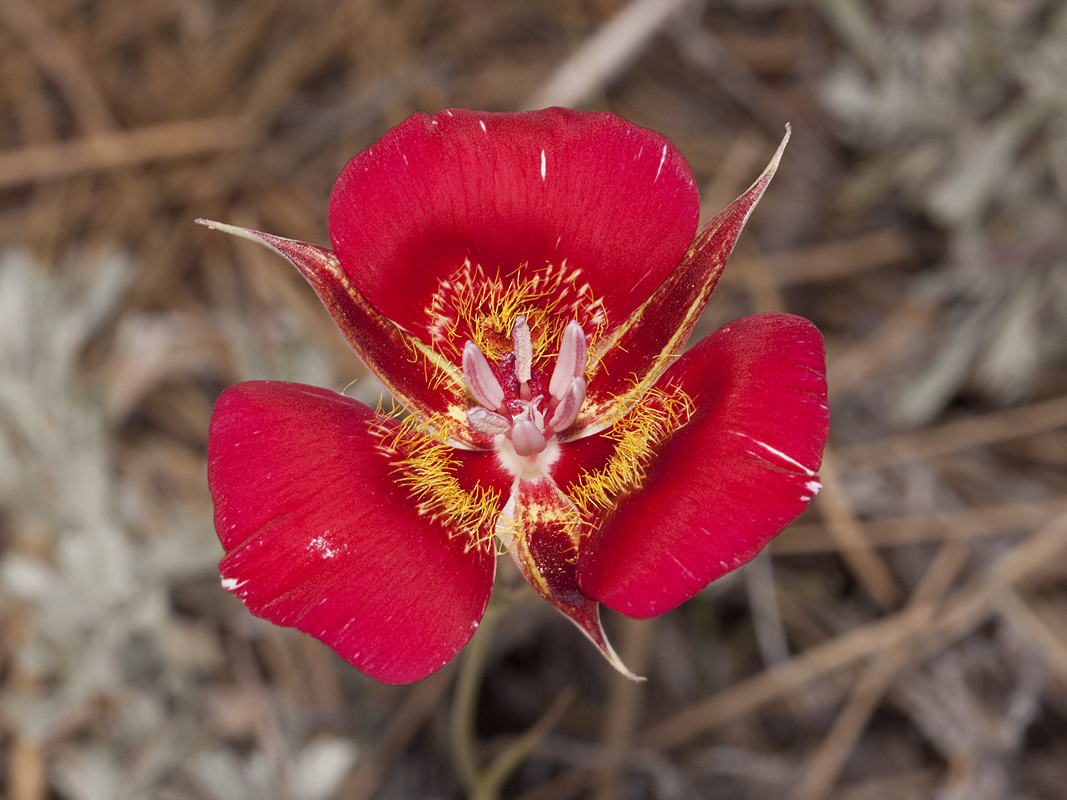
Red form, on Mount Pinos, San Emigdio Mountains.
