= Lake Alpine =

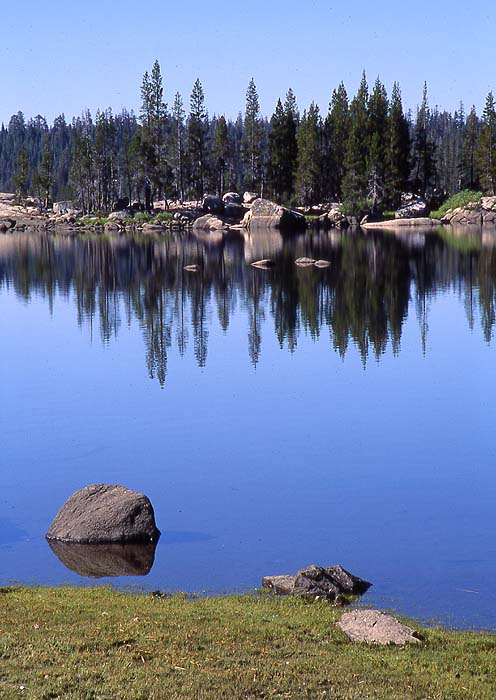
- Lake Alpine (©2001 Chris Hall, courtesy of byways.org)

- Location within California Location within the United States
- Location: Alpine County, California
- Coordinates: 38°28.6′N 120°0′W
- Type: Reservoir
- Primary outflows: Silver Creek
- Catchment area: 5.1 square miles (13 km^{2})
- Basin countries: United States
- Max. length: 1.1 mi (1.8 km)
- Max. width: 0.41 mi (0.66 km)
- Surface area: 179 acres (72 ha)
- Water volume: 4,600 acre-feet (5,700,000 m^{3})
- Surface elevation: 7,303 Feet (2,227 Meters)
- Islands: several islands and several islets

Lake Alpine is a reservoir in Alpine County, California, formed by Alpine Dam on Silver Creek. It is located east of Bear Valley in the Sierra Nevada range. It sits at 7,303 feet (2,227 m) above mean sea level and is a popular spot for outdoor activities, such as boating and hiking in the summer, and snowmobiling and skiing in the winter, although it may be inaccessible at times due to snow. California State Route 4 passes to the north of Lake Alpine between Bear Valley and the Pacific Grade Summit, through the unincorporated community of the same name. Another main part of Lake Alpine is camping, Lake Alpine has many campgrounds such as the Silvertip Campground.

== See also ==
- List of dams and reservoirs in California
- List of lakes in California
