= Bear Valley Mountain Resort =

Ski resort near Alpine County's Bear Valley, CA

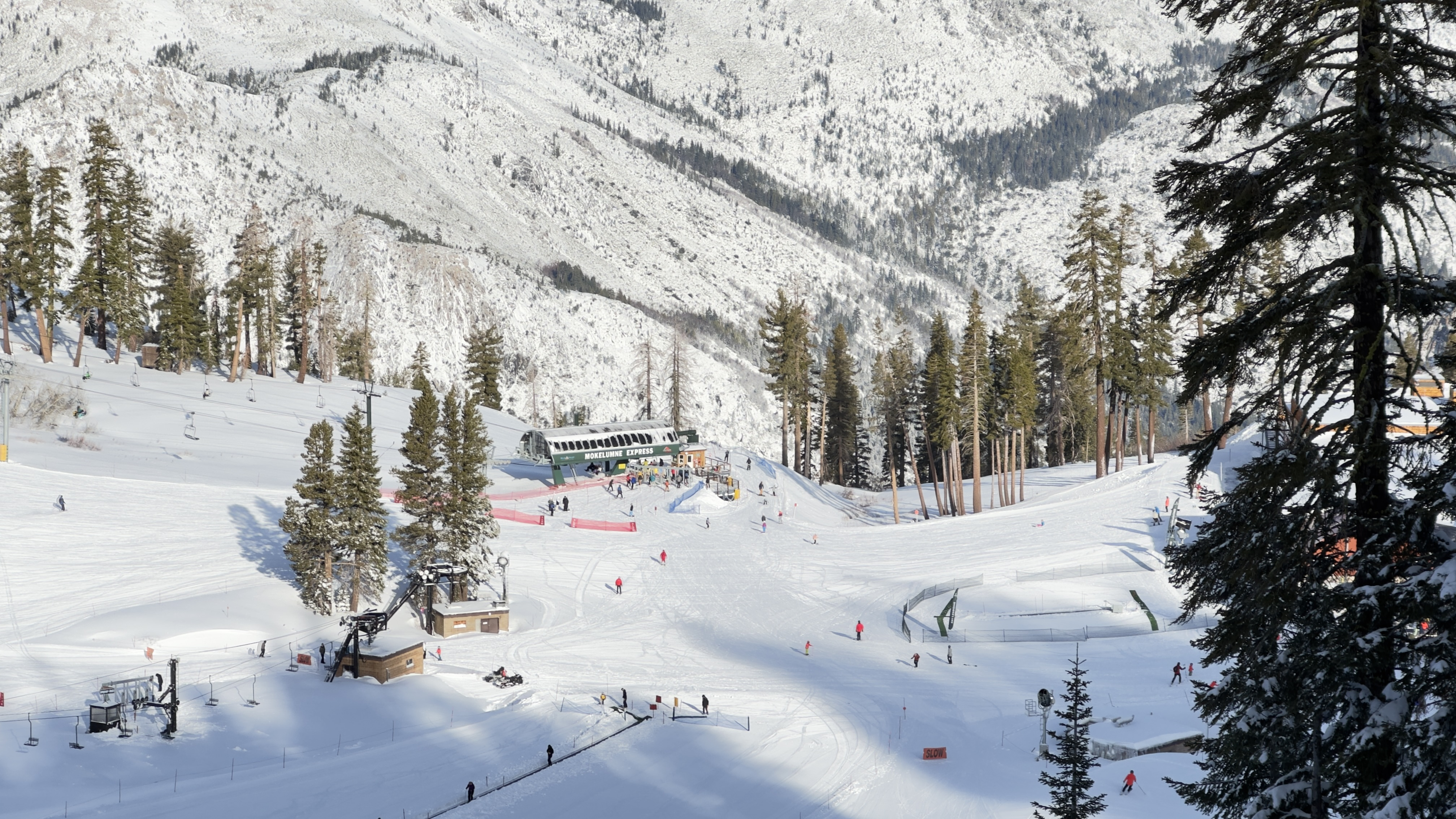
- Bear Valley overlook in 2024

- Location in California Location in the United States
- Location: Alpine County, California, U.S.
- Nearest city: Angels Camp
- Coordinates: 38°29′31″N 120°02′38″W
- Vertical: 1,900 ft (580 m)
- Top elevation: 8,500 ft (2,590 m)
- Base elevation: 6,600 ft (2,010 m)
- Skiable area: 1,680 acres (2.6 mi^{2}; 6.8 km^{2})
- Trails: 67 total 25% beginner 40% intermediate 35% advanced
- Lift system: 9 (1 high speed six pack, 1 high speed quad, 2 triples, 4 doubles, 2 carpet lifts)
- Snowfall: 359 inches (29.9 ft; 9.1 m)
- Snowmaking: 100 acres (40 ha)
- Website: bearvalley.com

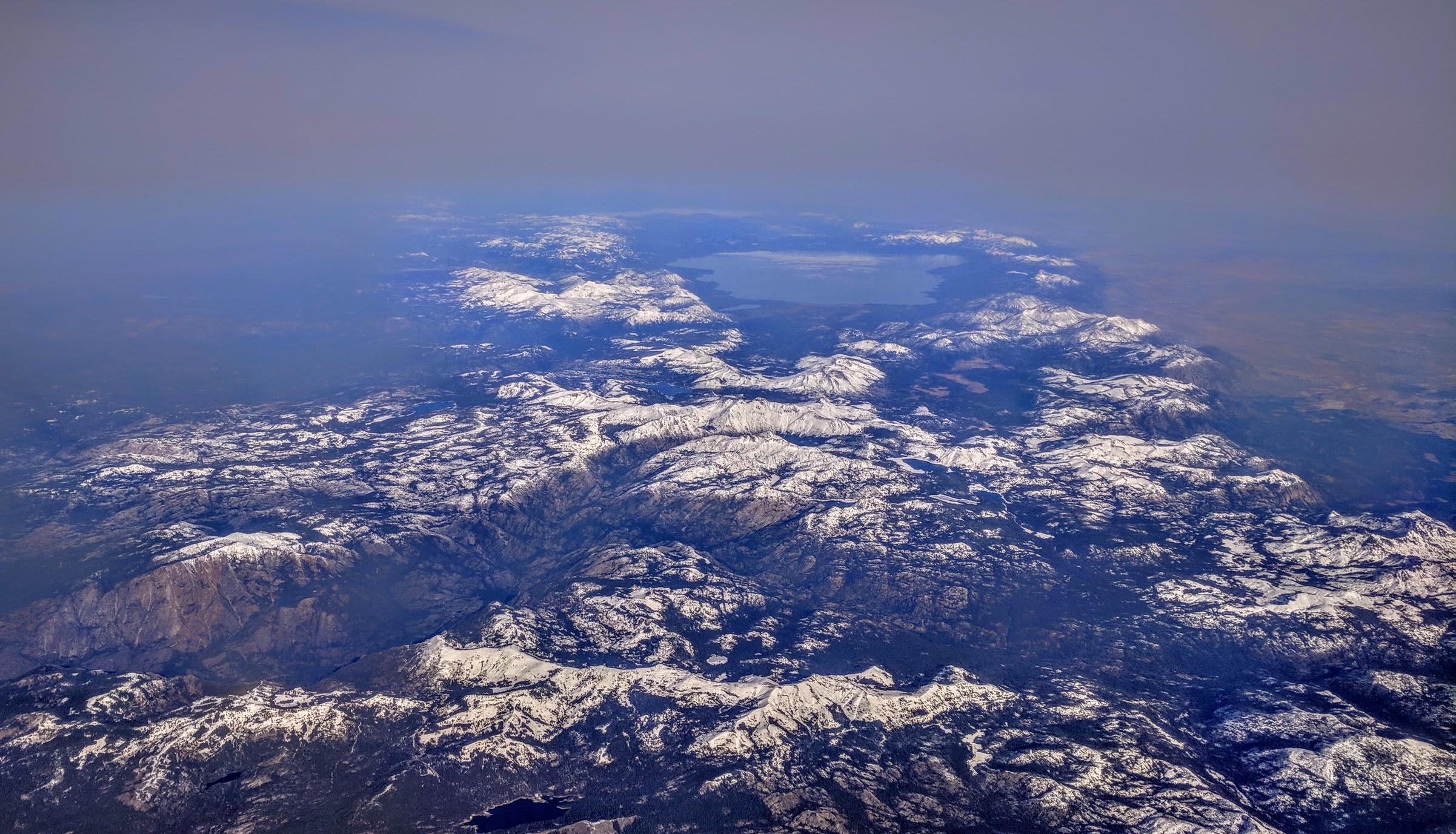
Aerial view of the Bear Valley, Kirkwood, and Lake Tahoe regions near the 2017–2018 season open

Bear Valley Mountain Resort is a ski area in the western United States, located in the Sierra Nevada of California on Highway 207, a route off of Highway 4 between Lake Tahoe and Yosemite National Park—about three hours southeast of Sacramento and one hour from Angels Camp. The alpine ski area and a portion of the real estate in the village of Bear Valley was owned by an investment partnership led by a Canadian company, Dundee Realty, from 2005 to 2014, then by Skyline International acquired Bear Valley through October 31, 2023.

== Skiing ==
Nine lifts provide access to 75+ runs covering 1,680 skiable acres (2.6 mi^{2}; 6.8 km^{2}).

Bear Valley is one of two resorts in the state that operate a NASTAR course nearly every weekend of the winter season. The Bear Valley Cross Country and Snowshoe Trail System consists of 35 trails covering 3,000 acres (12 km^{2}) of terrain. Bear Valley Cross Country is owned and operated by Paul and Diane Petersen. Paul Petersen is co-author of The Essential Cross Country Skier: A Step By Step Guide and a pioneer in the Nordic skiing industry in California.

== Bear Valley Music Festival ==
Since 1969, Bear Valley has hosted the annual Bear Valley Music Festival. The festival, which begins at the end of July and runs for 2 weeks and 3 weekends, includes a variety of music, including contemporary bands and classical concerts featuring a full symphony orchestra conducted by Maestro Alexander Mickelthwate.

== Future development plans ==
A lift from town has been planned for years, as is a mountain top day lodge and terrain expansion. In early 2013, the partnership that owns the ski area operation and a portion of the real estate in town decided to sell their holdings which now include entitlements for over 300 condominium homes. In September 2013, a deal to sell the ski area operation fell through. In December 2013 a group of Bear Valley property owners announced an initiative to explore community ownership options for both the ski area operation and the village. In February 2014, the Bear Valley Mountain Cooperative was formed with the objective of acquiring and managing those assets on behalf of the community. In 2014, the resort was acquired by Skyline International.

== Chairlifts ==
Name	Type	Years of Operation	Vertical Rise (ft)	Capacity (pph)	Notes
Mokelumne Express	High Speed Six	2017-	730	3000	
Grizzly	Double	1967-	1267	1200	
Koala	Quad	2024-	500	1800	To be replaced summer 2024 with a quad chair
Cub	Triple	1981-	228	1900	Shortened to replace the old Cub chair in summer 2024
Polar Express	High Speed Quad	2006-	953	2400	
Pooh Bear	Triple	1981-	735	2000	
Super Cub	Double	1970-	253	1100	
