= Alpine Lake (Mono County, California) =

Lake in the state of California, United States

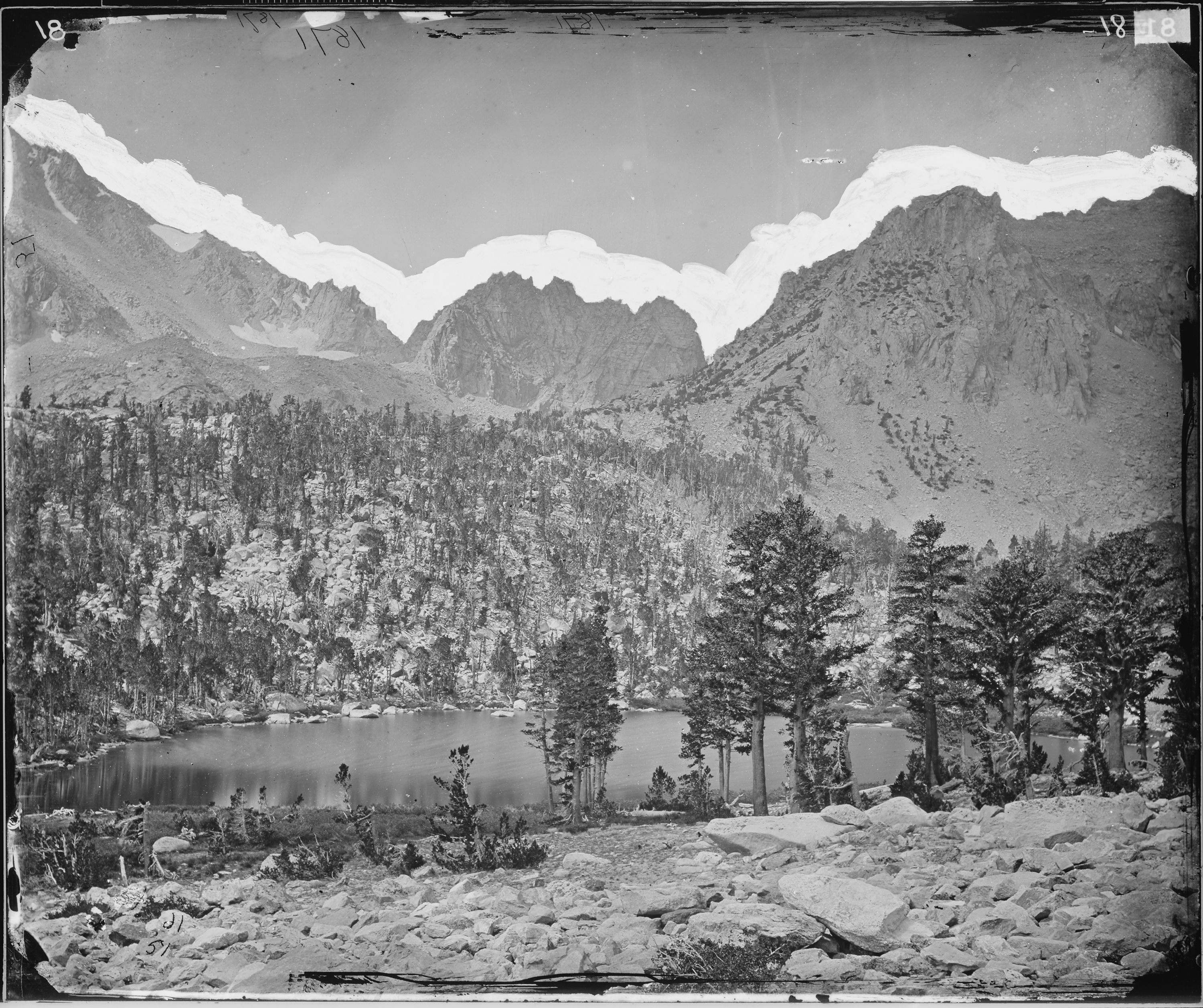
- Historical image

- Location within California Location within the United States
- Location: Mono County, California
- Coordinates: 37°57′44″N 119°18′16″W
- Type: Lake
- Surface elevation: 11,030 feet (3,360 m)

Alpine Lake is a lake in Mono County, California, in the United States.

Alpine Lake was named for its lofty elevation.

== See also ==
- List of lakes in California
