= Fremont Peak (San Bernardino County, California) =

Mountain in San Bernardino County, California, United States

Fremont Peak is an isolated peak in northwestern San Bernardino county, California at 35.194548 N, 117.455088 W. Its height is 4,520'; the surrounding Mojave Desert is between 2,500' and 2,800'.

The area around the peak supports numerous species, including the desert tortoise (Gopherus agassizii), coyote (Canis latrans), Mohave ground squirrel (Xerospermophilus mohavensis), kit fox (Vulpes macrotis), LeConte's thrasher (Toxostoma lecontei), ash-throated flycatcher (Myiarchus cinerascensand), and Say's phoebe.

The peak is about 3.5 miles south of the south end of Cuddeback Lake, 9.0 miles south of the north end of Cuddeback Lake, and 8.0 miles east of U.S. Route 395.
