= Fremont Peak =

Fremont Peak can refer to one of several peaks. In the United States, there are seven peaks with the same name:

Name	State	County	USGS map	Coordinates	Elevation	
Fremont Peak	Arizona	Coconino	Humphreys Peak	35°19′23″N 111°39′40″W	11,929 ft	3,636 m
Fremont Peak	California	Monterey	San Juan Bautista	36°45′26″N 121°30′19″W	3,097 ft	944 m
Fremont Peak	California	Mariposa	Bear Valley	37°33′34″N 120°04′35″W	4,170 ft	1,270 m
Fremont Peak	California	San Bernardino	Fremont Peak	35°11′41″N 117°27′19″W	4,452 ft	1,357 m
Fremont Peak	Colorado	Fremont	Royal Gorge	38°26′55″N 105°16′59″W	7,146 ft	2,178 m
Fremont Peak	Maine	Hancock	Tunk Mountain	44°40′29″N 068°01′31″W	151 ft	46 m
Fremont Peak	Wyoming	Fremont	Fremont Peak South	43°07′29″N 109°37′05″W	13,602 ft	4,146 m
