= Bear Valley, Alpine County, California =

Bear Valley
- Unincorporated Community; Census Designated Place
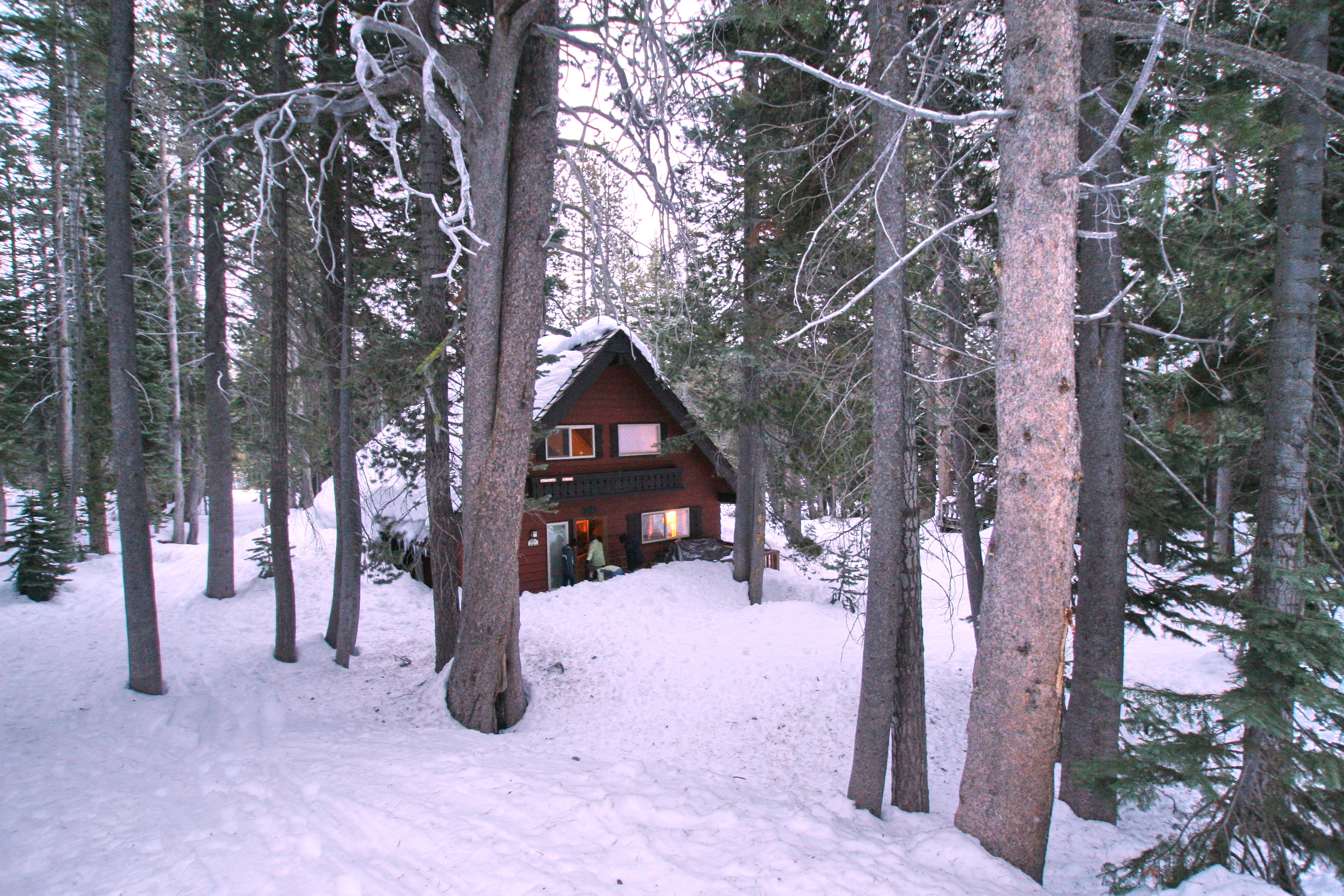
- A snowbound cabin in Bear Valley

- Location in Alpine County and the state of California

- Location in the United States
- Coordinates: 38°27′53″N 120°02′24″W
- Country: United States
- State: California
- County: Alpine

Government
  - State Senate: Marie Alvarado-Gil (R)
  - State Assembly: Heather Hadwick (R)
  - U. S. Congress: Kevin Kiley (I)

Area
  - Total: 5.18 sq mi (13.41 km^{2})
  - Land: 5.15 sq mi (13.35 km^{2})
  - Water: 0.023 sq mi (0.06 km^{2}) 0.42%
- Elevation: 7,100 ft (2,164 m)

Population (2020)
  - Total: 128
  - Density: 24.8/sq mi (9.59/km^{2})
- Time zone: UTC-8 (Pacific (PST))
  - Summer (DST): UTC-7 (PDT)
- ZIP code: 95223
- Area codes: 209, 350
- FIPS code: 06-04716
- GNIS feature ID: 1658018, 2407814
- Website: www.bearvalleymusic.org

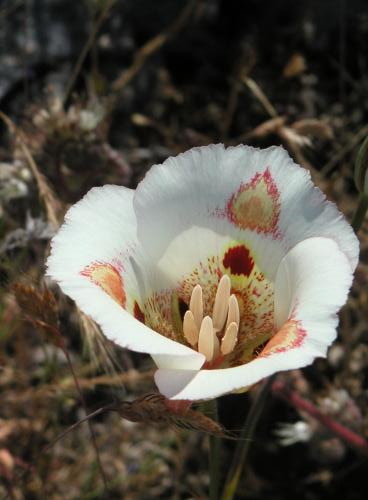
Butterfly Mariposa Lily on Fremont Peak, above Bear Valley.

Bear Valley is a census-designated place in Alpine County, California, United States, best known as the location of the Bear Valley ski area. The population was 128 at the 2020 census, up from 121 at the 2010 census.

== Geography ==
Bear Valley is within the Stanislaus National Forest and is reached by State Route 4. According to the United States Census Bureau, the CDP has a total area of 5.2 square miles (13 km^{2}), of which 99.58% is land and 0.42% is water. Although inside Alpine County, Bear Valley Fire Department has contracted with California Department of Forestry, San Andreas, for dispatching.

== Climate ==
Bear Valley's central Sierra location and elevation gives it a warm-summer Mediterranean climate that is nearly a subarctic climate. Precipitation is seen for a lot of the year except for the middle of the summer, which can experience thunderstorms. Late fall to early spring brings in most of the yearly precipitation, typically in the form of abundant snowfall. Furthermore, summers are warm with cool nights while winters are cold and relatively long.

== History ==
The Bear Valley post office opened in 1967.

== Arts and entertainment ==
The annual Bear Valley Music Festival takes place in Bear Valley in late July-early August.

== Demographics ==
Historical population
Census	Pop.	Note	%±
2000	133		—
2010	121		−9.0%
2020	128		5.8%
U.S. Decennial Census; 1860–1870 1880-1890; 1900 1910 1920; 1930 1940 1950; 1960 1970 1980; 1990 2000 2010; 2020

Bear Valley first appeared as a census designated place in the 2000 U.S. census.

=== 2020 census ===
Bear Valley CDP, California – Racial and ethnic composition Note: the US Census treats Hispanic/Latino as an ethnic category. This table excludes Latinos from the racial categories and assigns them to a separate category. Hispanics/Latinos may be of any race.
Race / Ethnicity (NH = Non-Hispanic)	Pop 2000	Pop 2010	Pop 2020	% 2000	% 2010	% 2020
White alone (NH)	116	118	113	87.22%	97.52%	88.28%
Black or African American alone (NH)	0	0	0	0.00%	0.00%	0.00%
Native American or Alaska Native alone (NH)	3	0	0	2.26%	0.00%	0.00%
Asian alone (NH)	0	1	1	0.00%	0.83%	0.78%
Native Hawaiian or Pacific Islander alone (NH)	0	0	0	0.00%	0.00%	0.00%
Other race alone (NH)	1	0	3	0.75%	0.00%	2.34%
Mixed race or Multiracial (NH)	8	1	5	6.02%	0.83%	3.91%
Hispanic or Latino (any race)	5	1	6	3.76%	0.83%	4.69%
Total	133	121	128	100.00%	100.00%	100.00%

The 2020 United States census reported that Bear Valley had a population of 128. The population density was 24.8 inhabitants per square mile (9.6/km^{2}). The racial makeup of Bear Valley was 91.4% White, 0.0% African American, 0.0% Native American, 0.8% Asian, 0.0% Pacific Islander, 2.3% from other races, and 5.5% from two or more races. Hispanic or Latino of any race were 4.7% of the population.

There were 79 households, out of which 21.5% included children under the age of 18, 64.6% were married-couple households, 5.1% were cohabiting couple households, 7.6% had a female householder with no partner present, and 22.8% had a male householder with no partner present. 20.3% of households were one person, and 6.3% were one person aged 65 or older. The average household size was 1.62. There were 58 families (73.4% of all households).

The age distribution was 19.5% under the age of 18, 10.2% aged 18 to 24, 12.5% aged 25 to 44, 26.6% aged 45 to 64, and 31.3% who were 65 years of age or older. The median age was 54.0 years. There were 76 males and 52 females.

There were 532 housing units at an average density of 103.2 units per square mile (39.8 units/km^{2}), of which 79 (14.8%) were occupied. Of these, 84.8% were owner-occupied, and 15.2% were occupied by renters.

== See also ==
- Bear Valley

== Sources ==
"Tuolumne-Calaveras Unit: 2005 Pre-Fire Management Plan September 28, 2005 Edition," California Department of Forestry and Fire Protection, 09–28–2005, pp. 16.
