= Lake Alpine, California =

Unincorporated community in California, United States

Lake Alpine
- Unincorporated community
- Location in California
- Coordinates: 38°28′43″N 120°00′14″W
- Country: United States
- State: California
- County: Alpine
- Elevation: 7,388 ft (2,252 m)

Lake Alpine is an unincorporated community in the Stanislaus National Forest in Alpine County, California, United States. It is located on the north shore of Lake Alpine, at an elevation of 7388 feet (2252 m).

A post office operated at Lake Alpine from 1927 to 1972.

Lake Alpine is a community of cabins authorized by the United States Forest Service under the Occupancy Permits Act.

== Camping ==
Camping is available near the lake. Also there are a number of beaches.
