= Get a Job =

Get a Job may refer to:

== Music ==
- "Get a Job" (song), a 1957 song by The Silhouettes
- "Get a Job", a song by Gossip from A Joyful Noise
- "Get a Job", a 2024 song by Jack Kays

== Television episodes ==
- "Get a Job" (Brandy & Mr. Whiskers)
- "Get a Job" (Even Stevens)
- "Get a Job" (The Fresh Prince of Bel-Air)
- "Get a Job" (Grounded for Life)
- "Get a Job" (Things You Should Have Done)

== Film ==
- Get a Job (1985 film), a winner of the Genie Award for Best Animated Short
- Get a Job, a 1998 film starring Bobbie Brown
- Get a Job, a 2011 film produced by Stefan Schaefer
- Get a Job (2016 film), a film starring Anna Kendrick and Miles Teller directed by Dylan Kidd

== See also ==
- Job (disambiguation)
- The Job (disambiguation)
- Get a life (disambiguation)
