= Jobin =

Jobin is a surname. Notable people with the surname include:

- André Jobin (1786–1853), notary and political figure in Lower Canada and Canada East
- Christian Jobin (born 1952), Canadian politician and Member of Parliament (MP)
- David Jobin (born 1981), Swiss professional ice hockey player
- Francis Lawrence Jobin (1914–1995), politician and the 18th Lieutenant Governor of Manitoba, Canada
- Joseph-Hilarion Jobin (1811–1881), notary and political figure in Canada East
- Maxime Pedneaud-Jobin (born 1968), Canadian politician, Mayor of Gatineau
- Raoul Jobin, CC (1906–1974), French-Canadian operatic tenor
- Tom Jobim (1927–1994), Brazilian composer, pianist, songwriter, arranger and singer
- Yolande Jobin (1930–2010), Swiss figure skater

== See also ==
- Tom Jobim Airport or Rio de Janeiro–Galeão International Airport, Brazil
- Jobbing (disambiguation)
- Jobbins
- Jobi (disambiguation)
