= Jobe (disambiguation) =

Jobe is a given name and a surname.

Jobe or Jobé may also refer to:

- Jobe Township, Oregon County, Missouri, United States, an inactive township
- Jobe, Missouri, United States, an unincorporated community
- Jobé, a subgroup of the Jaega Native American tribe, also a town of the Jaega

== See also ==
- Job (disambiguation)
