= Employment (disambiguation) =

Employment is the relationship between the employee and the employer.

It may also mean:

- Employment (album), the Kaiser Chiefs album
- "Employment" (short story), the short story by L. Sprague de Camp

== See also ==
- Military personnel
- Personnel (film)
- Job (biblical figure)
- Job (disambiguation)
- Occupation (disambiguation)
