= Job (surname) =

Job is a surname. Notable people with the surname include:

- Brian Job (1951–2019), American swimmer
- Daniel Job (born 2005), Nigerian footballer
- Herbert K. Job (1864–1933), American bird photographer, writer and conservationist
- Ignjat Job (1895–1936), Croatian painter
- Joseph-Désiré Job (born 1977), Cameroonian footballer
- Nick Job (born 1949), English golfer

== See also ==
- Job (disambiguation)
- Jobs (disambiguation)
