= Documentaries and minor subjects of the Thanhouser Company =

The Thanhouser Company (formerly the Thanhouser Film Corporation) was one of the first motion picture studios, founded in 1909 by Edwin Thanhouser. It operated until 1920. It produced over 1,000 films, but several dozen of the films were of small filler subjects, educational or documentaries. Many of these smaller subjects were listed as a quarter or half a reel in length and received very little critical review or analysis by film critics and the media.

== Quarter-reel comedies ==
=== The Old Shoe Came Back ===
The first quarter-reel comedy, of about 250 feet, was The Old Shoe Came Back. It was released on April 15, 1910. The film was appended to A 29-Cent Robbery and was first split reel released by the company. There is almost no information surrounding the short filler comedy. Film historian Q. David Bowers credits Thanhouser cameraman, Blair Smith, for the photography, but could not find any information about the film in contemporary trade journals. The film was advertised in numerous states, including theaters in Indiana, Kansas, and New York,

=== Sand Man's Cure ===
The second release was another short filler comedy, Sand Man's Cure is equally obscure. It was released on April 22, 1910, with Her Battle for Existence. Bowers did not find any information about the film in contemporary trade journals. A Thanhouser Filmography Analysis, provided by Thanhouser Company Film Preservation, lists it as comprising one quarter of a reel - approximately 250 feet. The reasoning is not provided, but the previous release and the next to follow were split reels of similar lengths. The film is not known to have appeared in any reviews or theater advertisements.

=== The Cigars His Wife Bought ===
The last of the three consecutive split-reel releases from Thanhouser was The Cigars His Wife Bought. Released on April 29, 1910, the official synopsis of the film was given in advertisements as: "The cigars his wife bought were bad - awful bad. What would you expect? A woman cannot buy cigars. How a suffering hubby tried to get rid of the cigars his better half bought him, and the mess his efforts got him into, is the story the picture tells." A review of the subject states that the scenario begins with a wife who purchases some bargain-priced cigars for her husband. The husband and those who he gives them to are also nearly sick from the poor cigars. The well-intentioned wife believes he must like them and orders several boxes for him. Little else is known about the production, but its photography was praised and Gloria Gallop is credited in the role of the wife. A Thanhouser Filmography Analysis, provided by Thanhouser Company Film Preservation, lists it as comprising one quarter of a reel - approximately 250 feet. Advertisements show the film paired with She Wanted to Marry a Hero in Texas and Kansas. Nearly a year after its release, the film was advertised without its other half in one Kearney, Nebraska, theater.

=== A Husband's Jealous Wife ===
The next quarter-reel comedy was A Husband's Jealous Wife and it was split with The Convict. Released on September 23, 1910, the film is also known by the alternative title, The Hero's Jealous Wife. The synopsis of the film was published in The Moving Picture World and it states, "John Boden, a young businessman, has a very jealous wife. If he pays the slightest attention to any other woman it arouses her anger. Boden, while not at all gay, is gallant, and finds that his life is rapidly becoming a burden. He is particularly upset when his wife discharges his British stenographer and hires a woman who is principally remarkable for her homeliness. On several occasions, Boden proves that he is of the stuff of which heroes are made, but each time his jealous wife spoils things for him. Much to his surprise he discovers that the homely Susie is his friend, and believes that he is ill-treated. Finally Boden decides that life at home is impossible, and he elopes with Susie, much to the horror and surprise of Mrs. Boden, who had regarded Susie as her natural ally." The film received some praise by the reviewers of The Moving Picture News and The Moving Picture World based on the overbearing wife's jealousy which drives her husband into eloping with the homeliest girl she could find. The film likely had a wide national release, known advertising theatres include Indiana, and Kansas. The film was also shown in Vancouver, British Columbia, Canada.

== Documentaries ==
=== Austin Flood ===
Austin Flood (1911)

There was 250 million gallons of water. Water from a dam that, according to its builder, could not fail. But it did. So much water was released when the dam failed on Sept. 30, 1911 that it destroyed the town of Austin, Pennsylvania, population 2,000, and took the lives of at least 78 people. Release date October 6, 1911.

Following news of the dam’s failure on September 30, 1911, a Thanhouser film crew rushed to Austin where 2,000 feet of film was exposed. An edited 750 feet was shown at Thanhouser's New Rochelle headquarters on Monday, October 2, 1911, and released to the Motion Picture Distributing and Sales Company on October 6. The extant footage survives at the Library of Congress and is scheduled for release on DVD and online streaming in October 2020.

To capitalize on the event, Thanhouser Company advertised this release in the October 7 issue of The Moving Picture News and the October 14 issue of The Moving Picture World as First on the Spot coverage of the Calamity The Motion Picture News headlined a review of the footage as a Scoop for Thanhouser – Special Austin Flood Pictures.

=== Roosevelt's Return ===
Shot on June 18, 1910, Roosevelt's Return was a production that may not have ever been released by the Thanhouser Company. There are two known announcements for this film, both on June 18. The first is in The Moving Picture World that the film would soon be released as a special release. The New York Clipper announced that the staff had prepared to capture former president Theodore Roosevelt's return to America. The film was shot in the New York harbor. A brief listing of a film bearing this name, listed at 350 feet in length, was featured in The Moving Picture World on October 22, 1910. Both Pathé and Vitagraph released films under this same title. Vitagraph's film was reportedly 415 feet long, and Pathé's film was about 200 feet in length.

=== Alaska's Adieu to Winter ===
Alaska's Adieu to Winter is a documentary that was labeled, perhaps erroneously, with the Thanhouser label. A record of this film exists in The Bioscope which states: "A realistic film, depicting the breaking up of the ice [on] the Tanana River. The heat of the sun breaks up the ice, the huge boulders collapse, and a wooden bridge is carried along, the massive beams being hurled down the stream and carried down to the sea." The 300-foot-long film was released in Britain on October 20, 1910. It was very unlikely to have been filmed by the Thanhouser company and no record of the film has been found in the United States. The identity of the bridge or the time period in which the film was captured is also unknown at this time.

=== Parade of the Volunteer Firemen of Westchester County and Vicinity ===
Parade of the Volunteer Firemen of Westchester County and Vicinity is a documentary film produced by the Thanhouser Company. Filmed on October 6, 1910, during a parade of volunteer firemen in New Rochelle, New York. The parade included horses, fire equipment and the firemen from the surrounding area. According to The New Rochelle Pioneer the Relief Engine Company arranged to have the film shown on October 27 and October 28, 1910, at Germania Hall in New Rochelle. According to the newspaper, in a later edition, the cost of the parade was $6,438.16 or equivalent to $222,000 in 2025.

=== The Life of a Fireman ===
The Life of a Fireman was shown at Germania Hall on October 27 and 28, 1910, along with Parade of the Volunteer Firemen of Westchester County and Vicinity. The film is likely a documentary and likely shows the New Rochelle fire department, but little is known about the actual film's content. It is not stated explicitly if the film was produced by the Thanhouser Company, but another film with the same title was produced around 1905.

== Educational films ==
Between 1913 and 1916, Thanhouser produced fifteen uniquely titled films with an educational focus, all of them except Jungle Life in South America were released as part of the Thanhouser brand. Six of the fifteen films depict Yellowstone Park. An American in the Making and The Spirit of Audubon are two drama productions that contained a significant educational element and both are listed as educational films in the Thanhouser database despite their dramatic elements.

=== Lizards of the Desert ===
Lizards of the Desert is a short, 384-foot-long subject of unknown origin. It was released on October 9, 1914, as part of a split reel with The Benevolence of Conductor 786 at the beginning. A reviewer of The Moving Picture World said the film showed, "Excellent views of the collared lizard, the horned toad, which is really a lizard also, and the Gila monster, the only poisonous lizard known."

=== Nature's Celebrities ===
Nature's Celebrities is a short subject of unknown length and origin that focuses on the African chameleon and the Indian cobra. It was released on November 22, 1914, as part of a split reel with A Messenger of Gladness at the beginning. Q. David Bowers writes, "This film may have been related to the efforts of Dr. Raymond Ditmars, of the nearby New York Zoological Gardens (Bronx Zoo), who was the subject of many trade paper articles for his pioneering films of snakes, lizards, turtles, and other herpetological subjects."

=== Yellowstone Park - Scenic films ===
In November 1914, it was announced that Thanhouser would be releasing a series of six one-reel scenic films of Yellowstone Park. Footage for these six reels was shot by Thanhouser cameraman, Carl Louis Gregory, and it was shot in the national park in August and September 1914. An announcement in January 1915 said that the films would be introduced by Franklin K. Lane, Secretary of the Interior Department, and that it would be part of a series of film titled "Our Own Country". Q. David Bowers sought for information on the release, but could not find that such a release ever materialized. The film work was claimed to be the first film shot on location and it was intended for educational rather than entertainment uses. Though Universal's Joker Comedies brand would also apparently include a scenic film titled "Views of Yellowstone Park", approximately 500 feet in length, released in December 1914. As part of the Universal brand, the scenic productions were likely obtained by a crew under the Universal banner. Q. David Bowers did not find any information on a conclusive release, but evidence suggests the films did in fact see some release. A January 8, 1915, advertisement called for children to see Yellowstone Park, a work deemed to be thirty minutes long, roughly three reels in length. In February 1915, another article suggesting the release occurred.

=== Big Gun Making ===
Big Gun Making is a 430-foot-long educational documentary made from footage taken by Lawrence Williams under the direction of George Foster Platt at the United States Arsenal at Watervliet, New York. The film was released in Britain on January 6, 1916, and featured footage taken during the production of A Maker of Guns.

=== Jungle Life in South America ===
Jungle Life in South America is a short subject that was added to the end of Falstaff's Maud Muller Modernized. The Falstaff brand was part of Thanhouser and focused exclusively on producing comedies, but this scenic addition is of unknown origin or length. It was released in the United States on March 2, 1916. The title claims to be of the jungles of South America and a reviewer of The Moving Picture World' described its content as, "Excellent glimpses of the deadly reptiles and smaller animals of South America."

=== Wild Birds at Home ===
Wild Birds at Home is a short, 330-foot-long subject featuring former United States President Theodore Roosevelt amongst birds. The cameraman for this production was Herbert K. Job, not a regular Thanhouser cameraman. The film was released on May 29, 1916, in Britain and possibly never released in the United States. The Bioscope reviewer stated the content of the film included: "Interesting studies of the pelican, white ibis, gallinule, etc. and sea birds at Bird Key."

=== Ex-president Roosevelt's Feathered Pets ===
Ex-president Roosevelt's Feathered Pets is a short, 350-foot-long subject featuring former President Theodore Roosevelt amongst birds. The cameraman for this production was Herbert K. Job, not a regular Thanhouser cameraman. The film was released on June 12, 1916, in Britain and possibly never released in the United States. The Bioscope reviewer summed up the film briefly, "Ex-President Roosevelt amongst the birds of Louisiana sea islands. Night hawks, purple martins, wild waterfowl, fledgling gulls, etc. A film of good interest and variable quality."

=== Herons and Egrets ===
Herons and Egrets is a short, 450-foot-long subject featuring the titular birds. The cameraman for this production was Herbert K. Job, not a regular Thanhouser cameraman. The film was released on June 19, 1916, in Britain and possibly never released in the United States.

== Unreleased or announced works ==
The one early production of the Thanhouser Company was Aunt Nancy Telegraphs. It was shot in December 1909 and never released. Lloyd F. Lonergan said it was the first scenario he wrote for the Thanhouser Company.
