= Occupation of Montenegro =

Occupation of Montenegro may refer to:

- Austro-Hungarian occupation of Montenegro (1916–1918) during World War I
- Italian governorate of Montenegro (1941–1943) during World War II
- German-occupied territory of Montenegro (1943–1944) during World War II

== See also ==
- Montenegro (disambiguation)
- Occupation (disambiguation)
