= Jokin =

Jokin is a masculine given name. It is the Basque name for Joachim, or Joaquín in Spanish. Notable people with the name include:

- Jokin Aperribay (born 1966), Spanish football executive
- Jokin Aranbarri (born 1984), Spanish footballer and manager
- Jokin Bildarratz (born 1963), Spanish politician
- Jokin Esparza (born 1988), Spanish footballer
- Jokin Ezkieta (born 1996), Spanish footballer
- Jokin Gabilondo (born 1999), Spanish footballer
- Jokin Mújika (born 1962), Spanish cyclist
- Jokin Murguialday (born 2000), Spanish cyclist
- Jokin Uria (born 1965), Spanish footballer

== See also ==
- Jobin
