= JOBS =

JOBS may refer to:

- Job Opportunities and Basic Skills Training program, a welfare-to-work program created by the Family Support Act of 1988
- Jumpstart Our Business Startups Act (2012), known as the JOBS Act
- Jobs (film), a biographical film based on the life of Steve Jobs

== See also ==
- Jobs (disambiguation)
