= She Wanted to Marry a Hero =

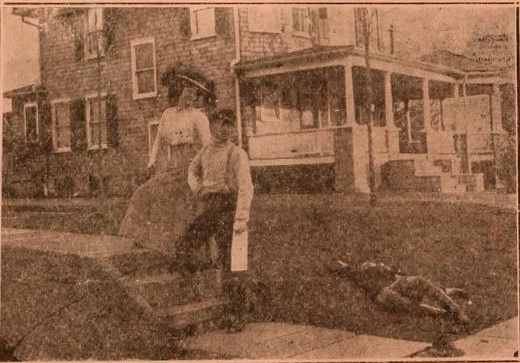
- A film still for the lost work
- Produced by: Thanhouser Company
- Release date: April 29, 1910
- Country: United States
- Languages: Silent film English intertitles

She Wanted to Marry a Hero is a 1910 American silent short drama produced by the Thanhouser Company. Elsie Plush, an avid dime novel reader, came to idolize the concept of a hero and rejected her plain boyfriend, George Mild. She idolizes a series of men, only to have each ideal candidate be shattered a short time later by a series of incidents which highlight their flaws or weaknesses. In the end, Elsie returns and accepts her boyfriend's marriage proposal. Released on April 29, 1910, as split-reel with The Cigars His Wife Brought, the film was given favorable reviews and had advertisements for its showing until late 1912. The film is presumed lost.

== Plot ==
The official synopsis of the film was published in The Moving Picture World. The film follows Elsie Plush, an avid dime novel reader who becomes infatuated with the hero type in Laura Jean Libbey's books. After reading A Great Hero, she rejects the marriage proposal of George Mild. She says that he is a fine young man, but he is not the hero she is looking for. Plush then encounters a military man and idolizes him as her hero. As she walks with the man, she falls from the bridge. Instead of saving her, he calls for help and she is rescued by an athlete. Elsie's ideal is broken and latches onto the athlete as her hero.

Elsie's ideal is quickly dashed in repeated succession for the athlete fails to manage a horse and then becomes interested in the horseman who reins it in. The horseman secures her interest only to become beaten by a pugilist in a fight. She is keen on the pugilist until an escaped lunatic arrives and scares him away. The maniac is brought under control by a hypnotist and is taken back to the asylum. Again Elsie idolizes this new man and asks him to escort her home. They encounter a footpad on the way, who robs them both. The thief is frighted off by a policeman, but Elsie finds he is married with five children. Then she is robbed again. At last Elsie recognizes the hero she idolizes is fictional and returns to George and accepts his proposal.

== Cast ==
- Anna Rosemond as Elsie Plush /the hero-seeking girl
- Bernard Randall

== Production ==
The back story and focus of the film is based on Elsie's obsession for a dime novel-styled hero, specifically Laura Jean Libbey. Known for writing 82 novels, Libbey was a prolific writer of sensational romances. The story attributed to Libbey, A Great Hero is fictional publication because Libbey authored no work of that title. The writer of the scenario is unknown, but it may have been Lloyd Lonergan. Lonergan was an experienced newspaperman still employed by The New York Evening World while writing scripts for the Thanhouser productions. He was the most important scriptwriter for Thanhouser, averaging 200 scripts a year from 1910 to 1915.

The director of the film is not known, but two Thanhouser directors are possible. Barry O'Neil was the stage name of Thomas J. McCarthy, who would direct many important Thanhouser pictures, including its first two-reeler, Romeo and Juliet (1911 film). Lloyd B. Carleton was the stage name of Carleton B. Little, a director who would stay with the Thanhouser Company for a short time, moving to Biograph Company by the summer of 1910.

Film historian Q. David Bowers does not attribute either as the director for this particular production nor does Bowers credit a cameraman. Blair Smith was the first cameraman of the Thanhouser company, but he was soon joined by Carl Louis Gregory who had years of experience as a still and motion picture photographer. The role of the cameraman was uncredited in 1910 productions. Anna Rosemond was one of two leading actresses for Thanhouser and had two credited prior appearances, St. Elmo and She's Done it Again. Bernard Randall was an actor credited with only this one Thanhouser production, but the credit includes the erroneously claim that this was also the first commercial release by Thanhouser when it was the eighth.

== Release and reception ==
The film was released on April 29, 1910. The production was a split reel, containing both She Wanted to Marry a Hero and The Cigars His Wife Brought, with an estimated length of 1000 feet. Some publications erroneously would list the film's release as being on April 22, but this was the split reel release of Her Battle for Existence and Sand Man's Cure. The film was advertised by theaters in Texas, Indiana, North Carolina, Kentucky, Pennsylvania, and Kansas. One of the last advertisements would be for a showing in Indiana, Pennsylvania on December 31, 1912.

An article and a review in The Moving Picture World said the film serves as a cautionary tale for women who seek dime novel heroes. The Morning Telegraph provided a positive review, but pointed out a specific continuity error in the production. In the scene where Elsie and the athlete come out of water, both of their clothes are completely dry instead of being wet. The film was advertised by the Joyland Theatre in Wilmington, North Carolina as "society comedy" instead of a drama. The film is presumed lost.

== See also ==
- List of American films of 1910
