= Austin Dam failure (Pennsylvania) =

1911 dam failure

Austin Dam
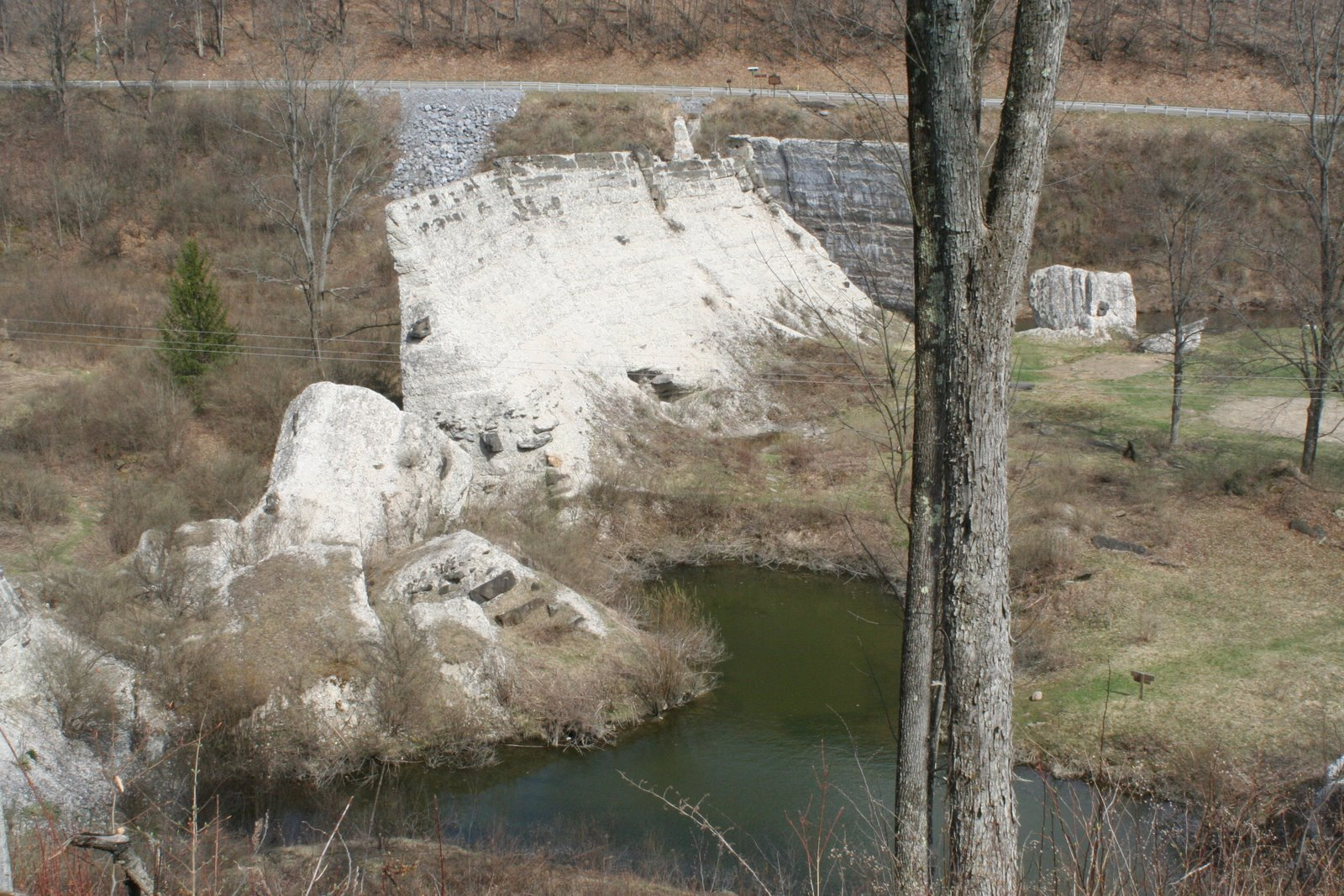
- Remnants of Austin Dam in 2008
- Interactive map of Austin Dam
- Location: Keating Township, Potter County, near Austin, Pennsylvania
- Opening date: December 1909; 116 years ago
- Demolition date: September 30, 1911; 114 years ago
- Operators: Bayless Pulp & Paper Company

Dam and spillways
- Impounds: Freeman Run
- Height: 50 feet (15 m)
- Length: 540 feet (160 m)

Reservoir
- Creates: Austin Dam Pool
- Total capacity: 200,000,000 US gallons (760,000,000 L)
- Austin Dam
- U.S. National Register of Historic Places
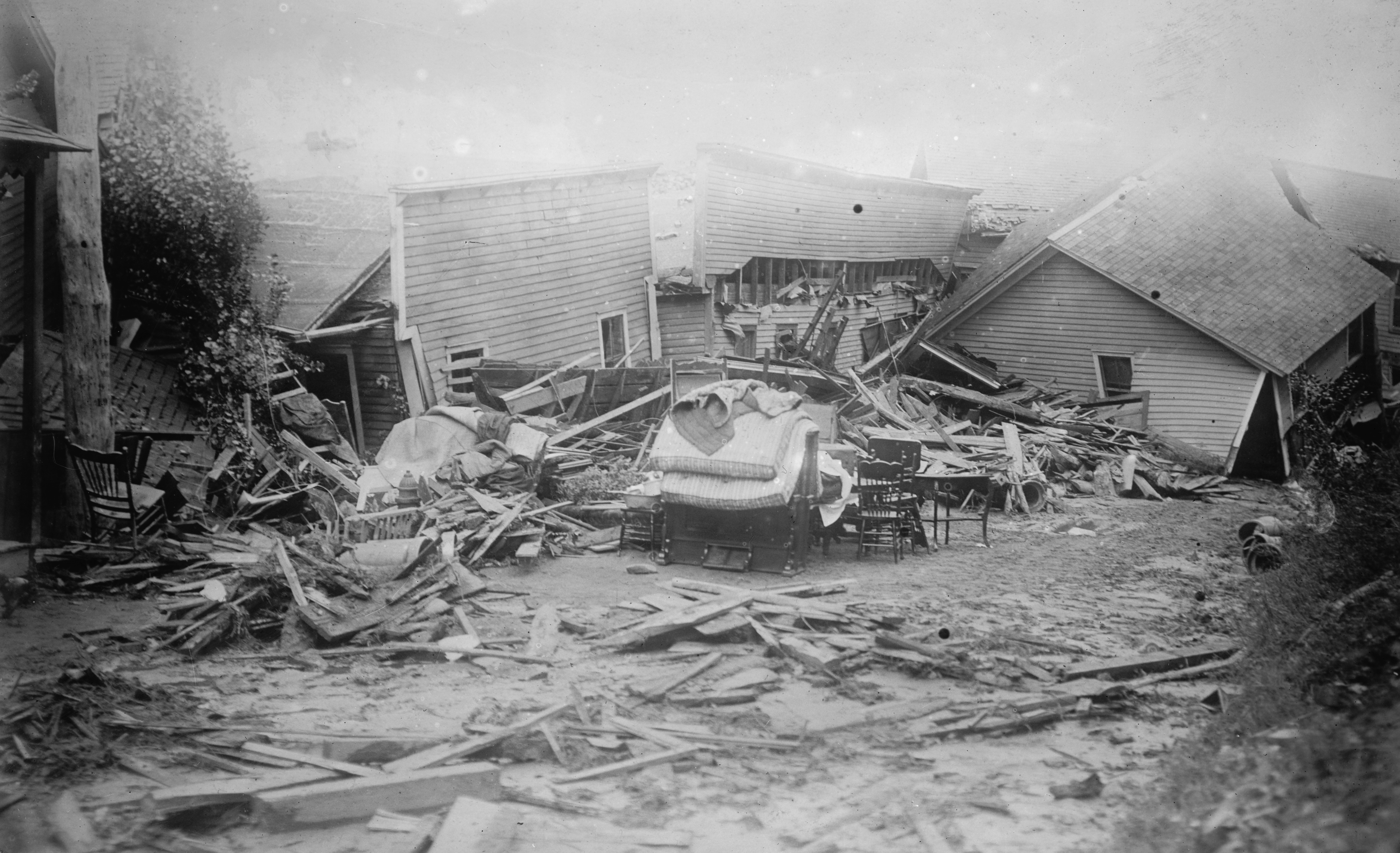
- School house after dam disaster

- Location within Pennsylvania Location within the United States
- Location: PA 872, Austin, Pennsylvania
- Coordinates: 41°39′11″N 78°5′8″W
- Area: 1.3 acres (0.53 ha)
- Built: 1911; 115 years ago
- Built by: Hatton, T. Chalkey
- NRHP reference No.: 86003570
- Added to NRHP: January 15, 1987

The Austin Dam, also known as the Bayless Dam, was a concrete gravity dam in the Austin, Pennsylvania, area that served the Bayless Pulp and Paper Mill. Built in 1909, it was the largest dam of its type in Pennsylvania at the time. The catastrophic failure of the dam on September 30, 1911, caused significant destruction and loss of life in Freeman Run Valley below the dam.

== History ==
In 1900, George Bayless, owner of Bayless Paper, built a paper mill in the Freeman Run Valley. By 1909, the company realized that occasional dry seasons required a more reliable water source. After finding a small earthen dam to be inadequate, the T. Chalkey Hatton firm was commissioned to build a large concrete gravity dam across the valley. The dam was 50 feet (15 m) high and 540 feet (160 m) long, and cost $86,000 to construct, (nearly $3,000,000 today adjusted for inflation). It was designed to be 30 feet thick, but was built only 20 feet thick. Because it was deemed too expensive, an underground vertical concrete slab, which had been designed to prevent water seeping under the dam through the soil on which the dam sat, was not built, on Bayless's orders. At the time, Pennsylvania had no state regulations or requirements about the building of dams.

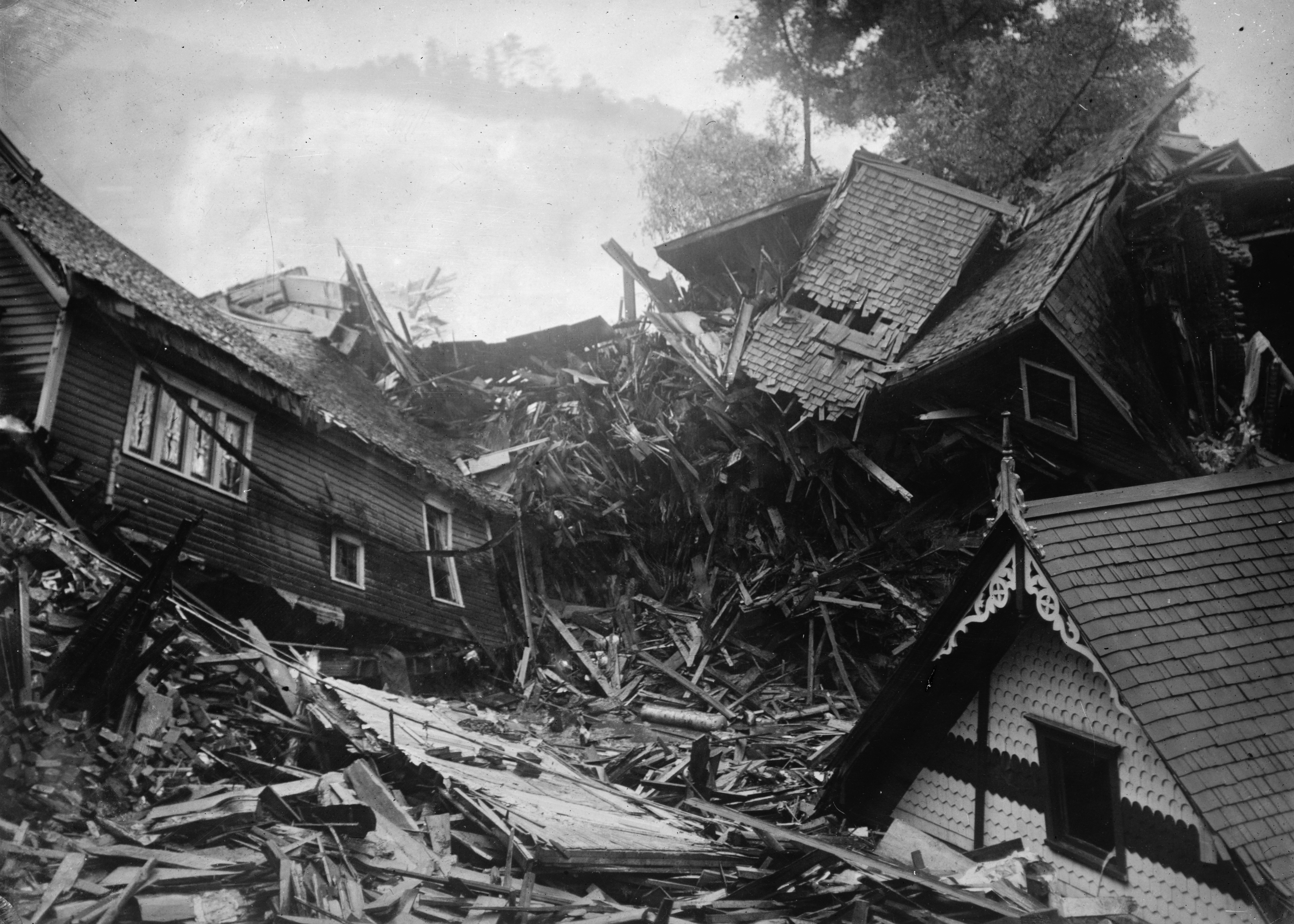
Flood-damaged homes

The inhabitants of the town of Austin, Pennsylvania, downstream from the dam, referred to it, with Bayless's encouragement, as "The dam that could not break."

Within only a few months of its completion, problems were detected. Water was seeping under the dam, which also bowed more than 36 feet (11 m) under the pressure of the water it was holding, and the concrete started cracking. The bowing was alleviated by using dynamite to blast a 13-foot (4.0 m) space for the excess water to spill over. The cracking was claimed to be normal because of the drying concrete.

On September 30, 1911, a holiday, after a week of rainstorms that raised the level of the reservoir to only 2 feet below the overflow level, the dam failed. Part of the structure slid down about 50 feet (15 m), while another opened like a door, allowing the impounded water to flow freely down the narrow valley. The wall of water destroyed the paper mill and much of the town of Austin, which was so deeply covered by water in places that only church steeples could be seen. Due to the slope of the valley, the east side of the town received more damage.

Around 3,000 people were in Austin that day, and the catastrophic failure of the dam resulted in the deaths of 78 of them, and roughly $10 million in property damage. Cora Brooks, the madam of the town's brothel, which was located upstream of the town, saw the failure coming and warned the town, saving many lives. The paper mill and dam were subsequently rebuilt, but the mill was lost in a fire in 1944. A new dam was built, but it also failed, in 1942, with no loss of life. The dam was not replaced after the second failure.

== Legacy ==
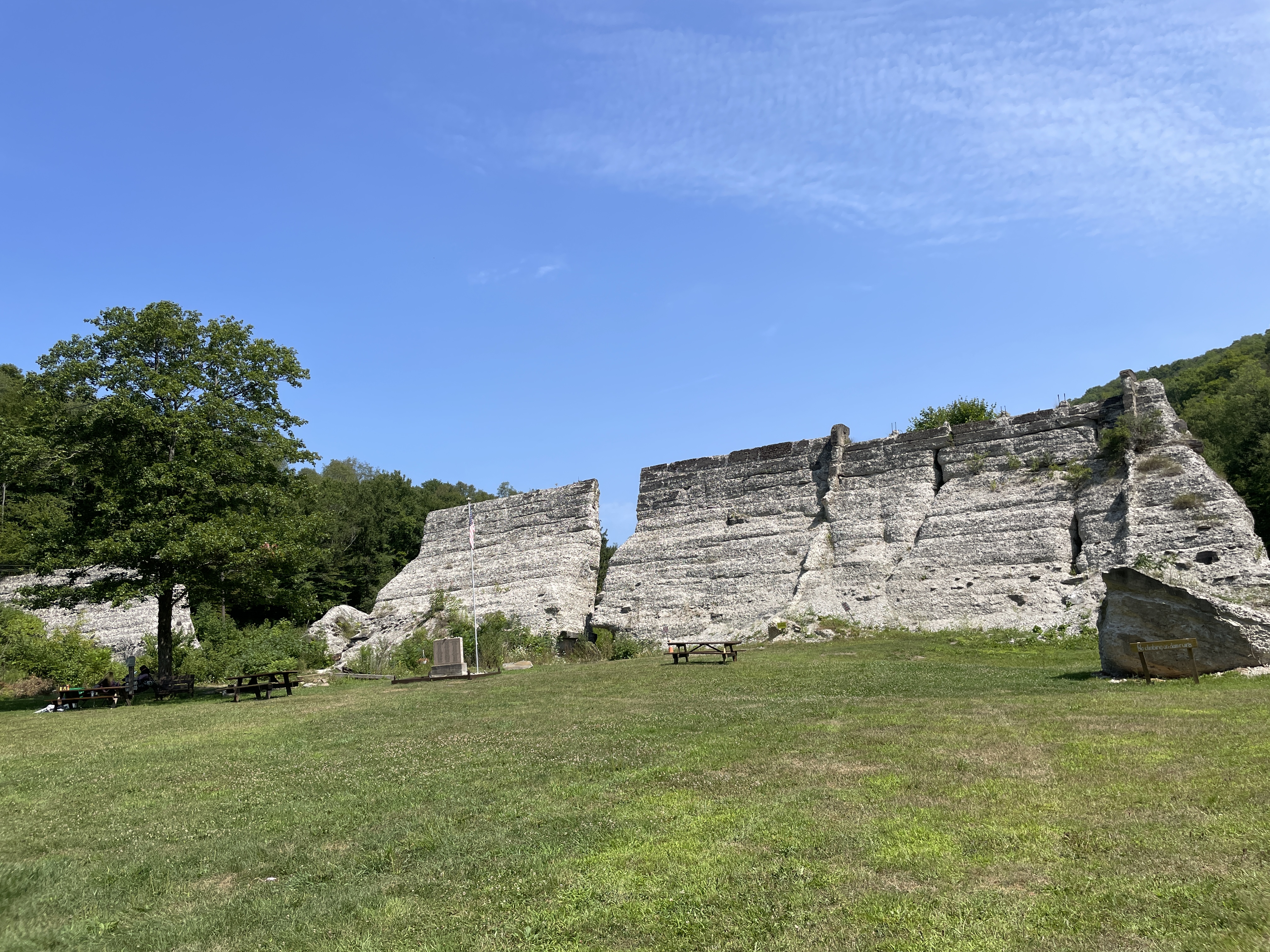
Austin Dam ruins

The victims of the dam break are commemorated in the Austin Dam Memorial Park.

The remains of the failed first dam still stand. The ruins consist of a series of broken sections extending east-west across the Freeman Run Valley - five upright sections and two large and several smaller toppled sections. The site was added to the National Register of Historic Places in 1987.

== In popular culture ==
- A documentary about the dam disaster, featuring narration by Willie Nelson, was created by Mansfield University of Pennsylvania professor Gale Largey in 1999. It includes interviews with five survivors along with original newsreel footage.
- An earlier documentary about the dam failure, simply titled Austin Flood, was filmed likely on the very next day by the Thanhouser Company, and released as early as October 6, 1911; it consisted in 750 feet of film, showing “the suffering, horror and devastation wrought by the flood”.
- This is likely the dam failure graphically depicted by Margaret Sutton in her Judy Bolton novel.
