= Jobber =

Jobber may refer to:

== Athletics ==
- Job (professional wrestling) - A professional wrestler who routinely loses a match.
- Wichita Jobbers, a minor league baseball team in the Western Association from 1905 to 1911

== Commerce ==
- A person or corporation that engages in job production
- One who performs odd jobs or piece work
- Jobber (merchandising), mass merchandising distributor of goods to retailers
- Jobbing house or jobber, a type of wholesale business
- Jobber (fuel), a middleman in the fuel industry
- Stockjobber, a dealer in financial securities
- A retailer, particularly within the automobile industry
- Rack jobber
- Meat jobber

== People ==
- John McGrath (Westmeath hurler) (1928–1980), Irish hurler nicknamed "Jobber"

== Places ==
- Jobbers Canyon Historic District

== Publishing ==
- Jobbing press or jobber, a type of printing press

== Tools and equipment ==
- Jobber, a length of drill bit; see drill bit sizes
- Jobber chairs; see Charles Dillon (designer)

== See also ==
- Job (disambiguation)
- Jobbing (disambiguation)
