= Occupy =

Occupy may refer to:

- Occupy (book), a 2012 short study of the Occupy movement by Noam Chomsky
- Occupy movement, an international protest that began in New York

== See also ==
- Occupancy, a piece of property used to shelter something
- Occupation (disambiguation), various meanings
