= Jobs Sister =

Mountain in California, United States

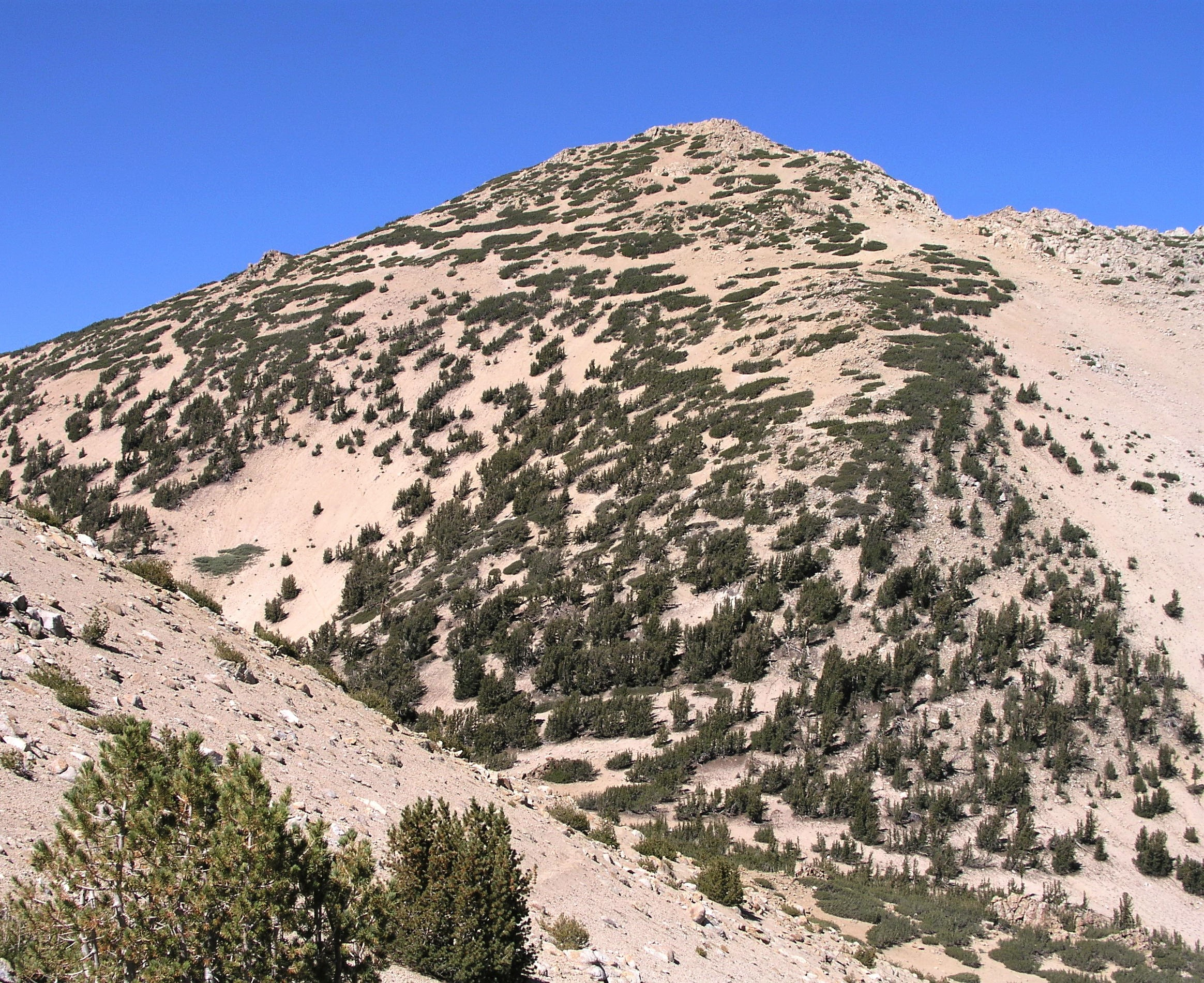
- Southeast aspect

Highest point
- Elevation: 10,823 ft (3,299 m)
- Prominence: 343 ft (105 m)
- Parent peak: Freel Peak (10,886 ft)
- Isolation: 0.90 mi (1.45 km)
- Listing: Tahoe OGUL Peak
- Coordinates: 38°51′44″N 119°53′04″W

Geography
- Location within California Location within the United States
- Location: El Dorado / Alpine counties, California, United States
- Parent range: Sierra Nevada; Carson Range
- Topo map: USGS Freel Peak

Geology
- Rock age: Late Cretaceous
- Mountain type: Fault block
- Rock type: Granodiorite

Climbing
- Easiest route: class 1 hiking

Jobs Sister is a mountain summit located near Lake Tahoe in northern California.

== Description ==
Jobs Sister is situated on the common border that El Dorado County shares with Alpine County, as well as the boundary Eldorado National Forest shares with Humboldt-Toiyabe National Forest. It is set on the crest of the Carson Range which is a subset of the Sierra Nevada. At an elevation of 10,823-foot (3,299-meter), Jobs Sister is the second-highest summit in the Carson Range and the Tahoe Basin, and only 63 feet lower than line parent Freel Peak. Topographic relief is significant as the summit rises 6,000 feet (1,800 meters) above Carson Valley in four miles. The Tahoe Rim Trail traverses the northern slope of the mountain, providing an approach option. This landform's toponym has been officially adopted by the U.S. Board on Geographic Names, and was named by the Whitney Survey on an 1881 map. It is named in association with Jobs Peak (1.3 mile east) which in turn is named for Mormon settler, Moses Job, who operated a store in Carson Valley in the 1850s.

== Climate ==
According to the Köppen climate classification system, Jobs Sister is located in an alpine climate zone. Most weather fronts originate in the Pacific Ocean, and travel east toward the Sierra Nevada mountains. As fronts approach, they are forced upward by the peaks (orographic lift), causing them to drop their moisture in the form of rain or snowfall onto the range.

== Gallery ==
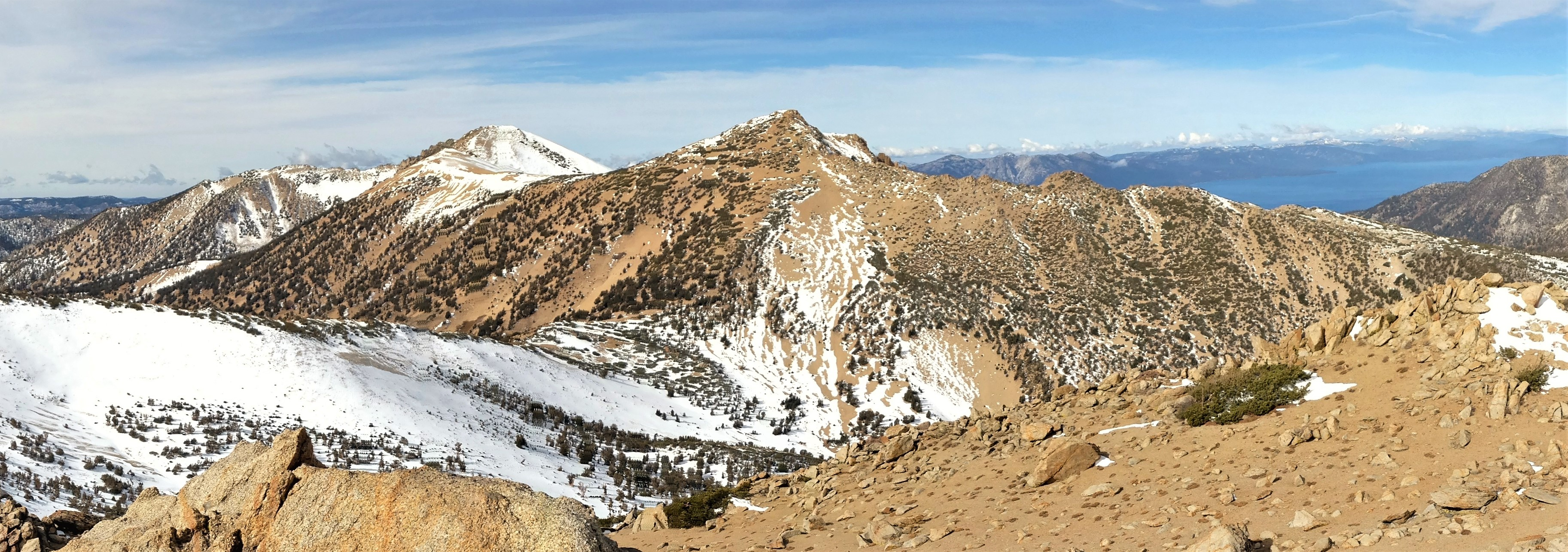
Jobs Sister centered

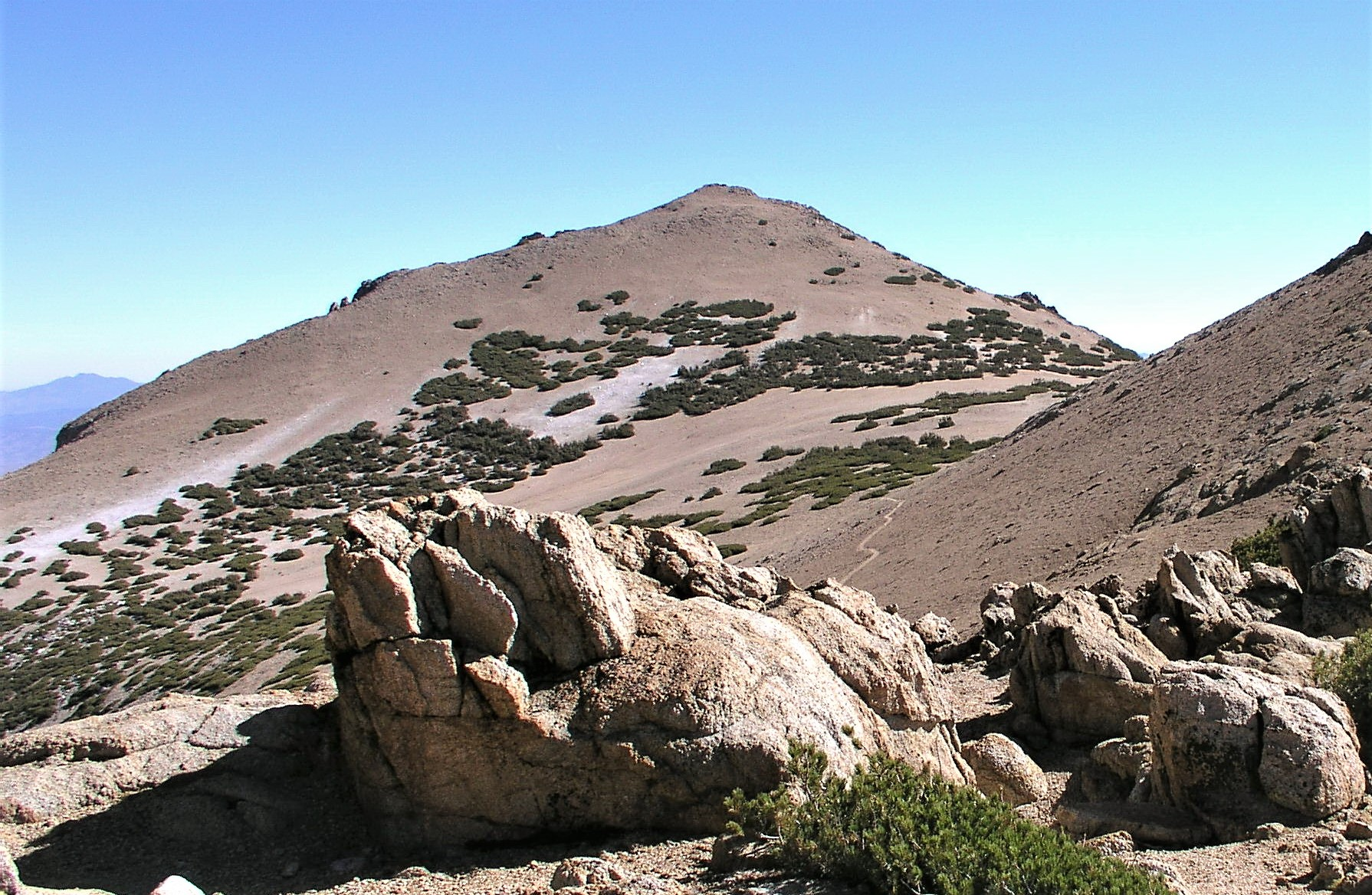
Southwest aspect

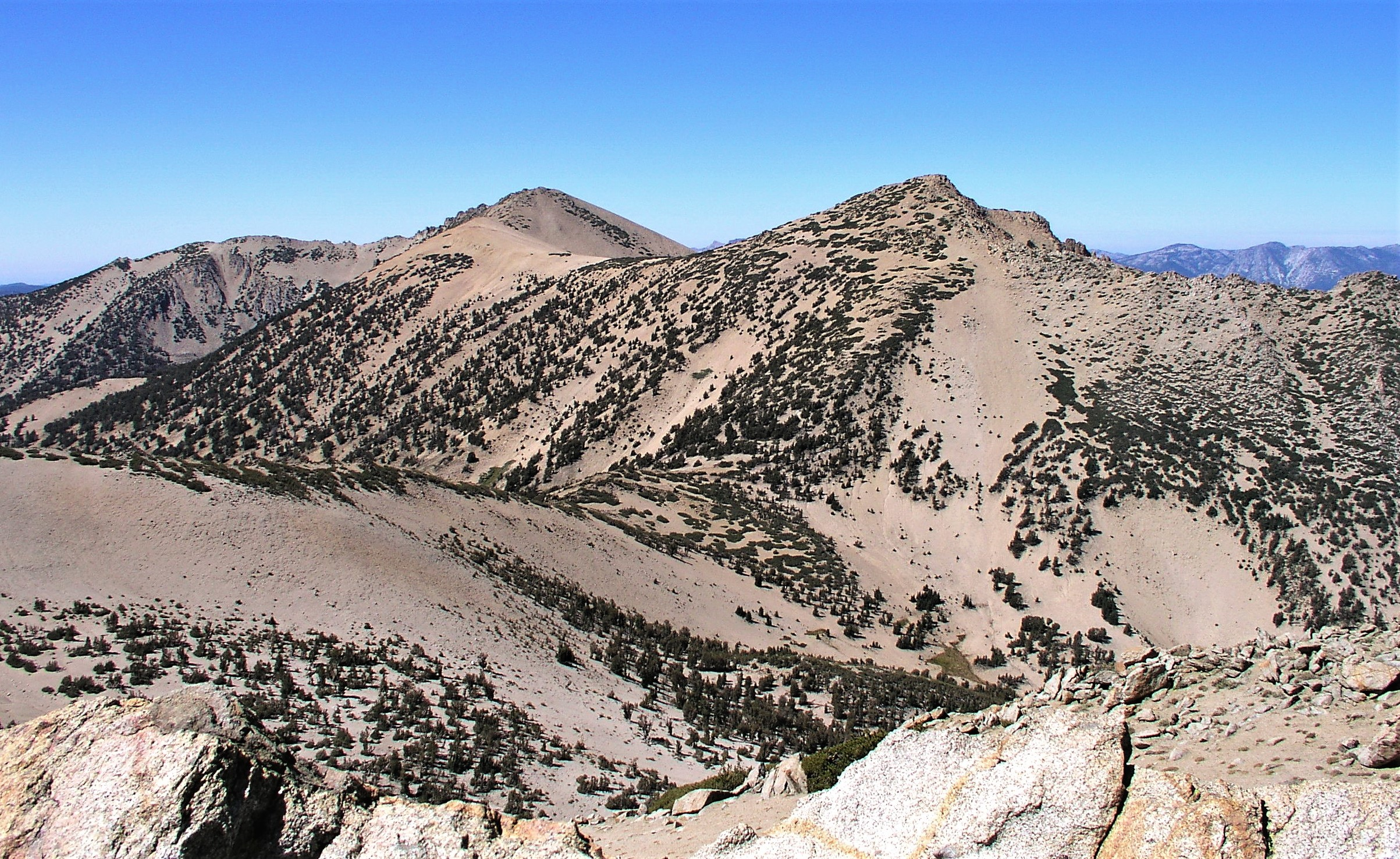
Freel Peak (left) and Jobs Sister (right) seen from Jobs Peak

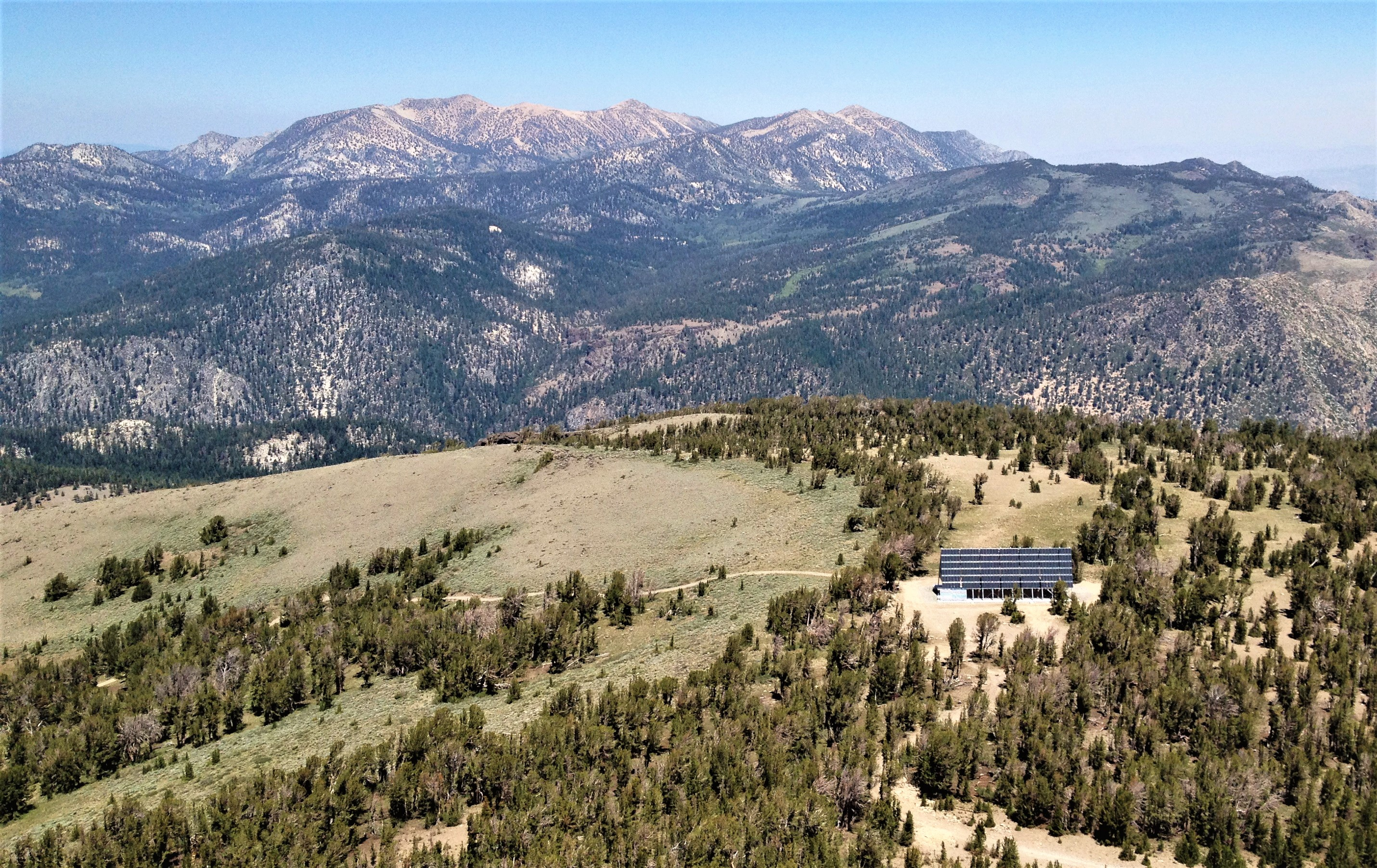
Freel Peak, Jobs Sister, and Jobs Peak seen from Hawkins Peak.

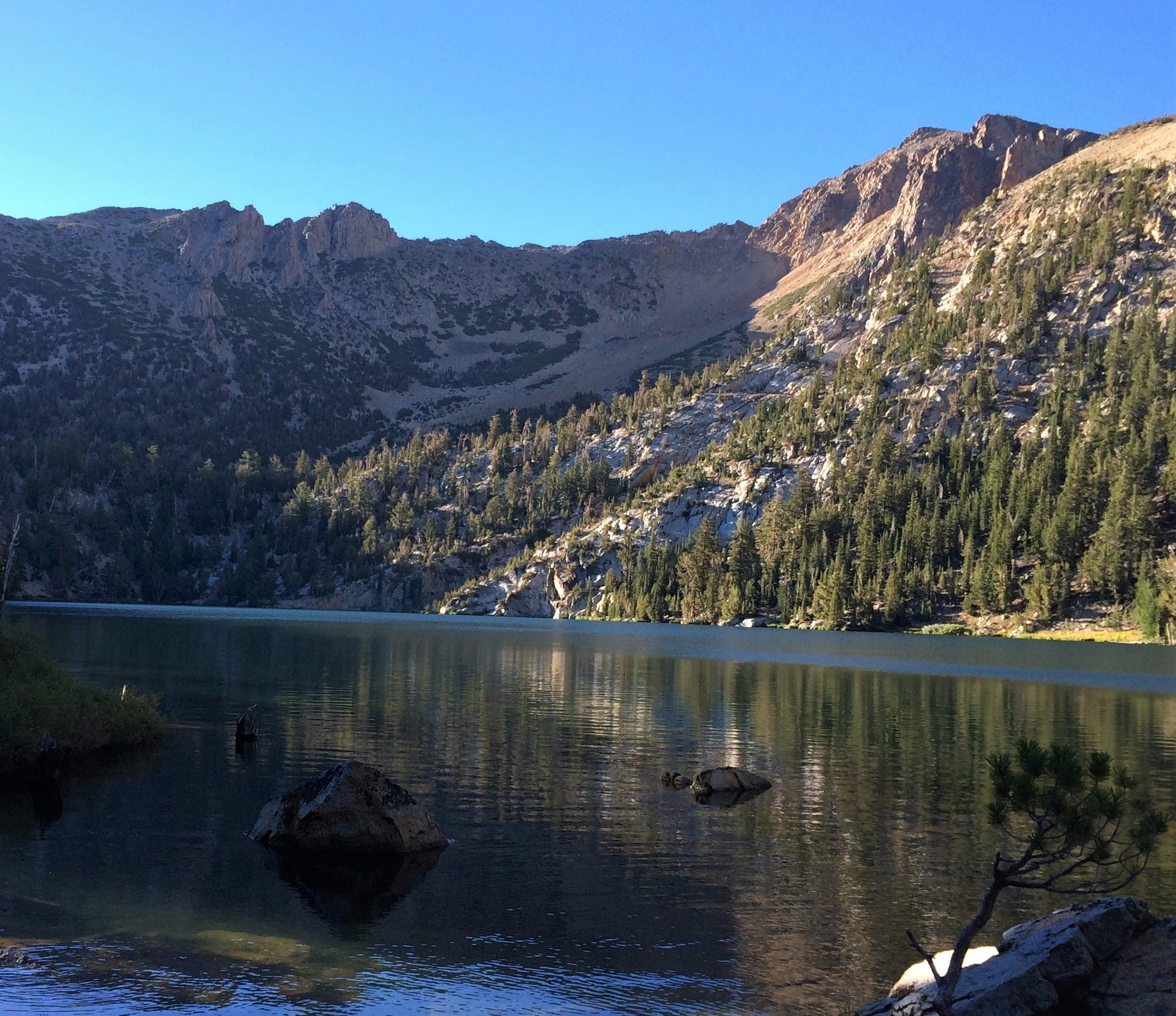
Jobs Sister (upper right) from Star Lake

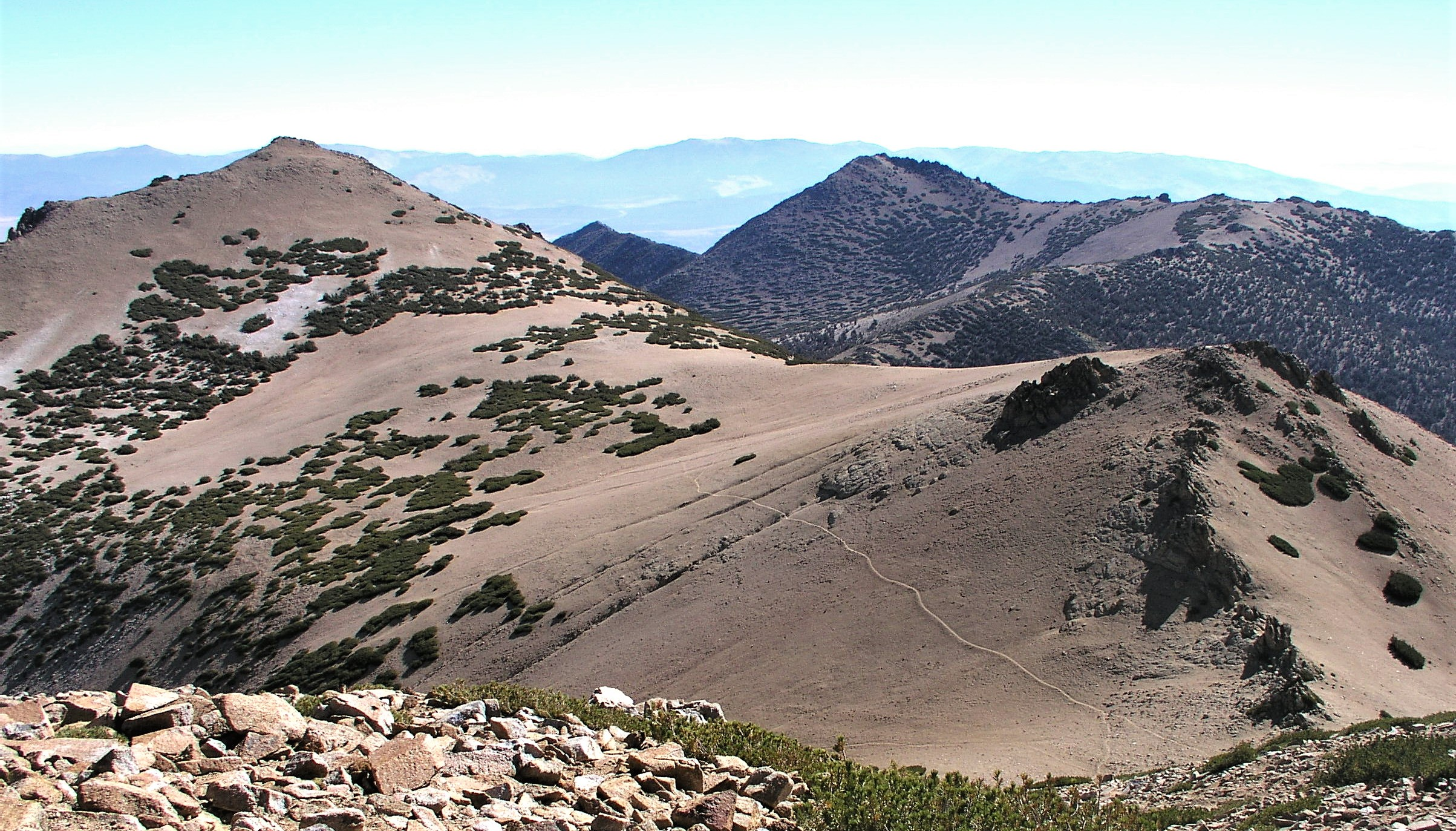
Jobs Sister (left) and Jobs Peak (right of center) seen from Freel Peak

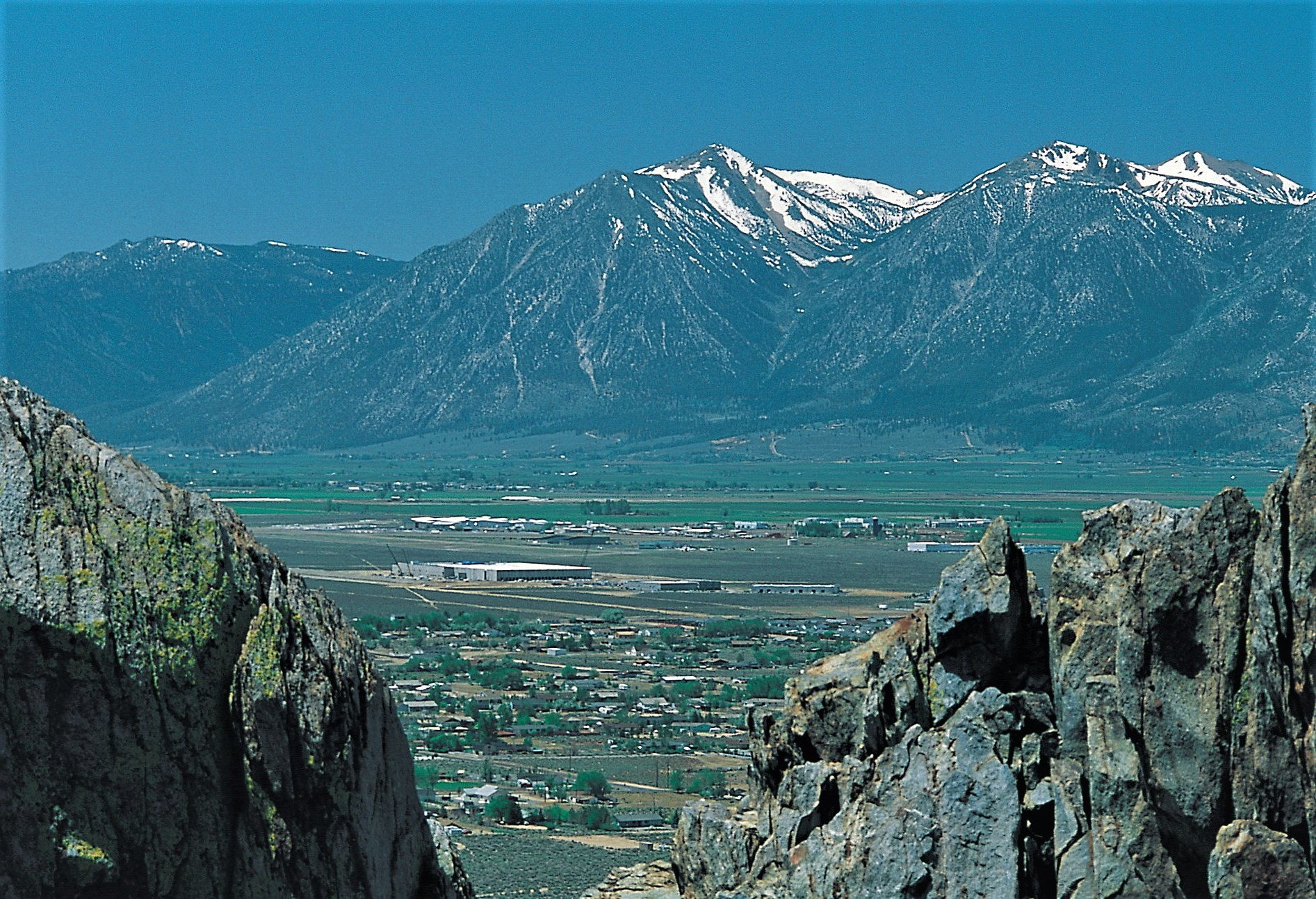
Jobs Peak, Jobs Sister, and Freel Peak rise above Carson Valley

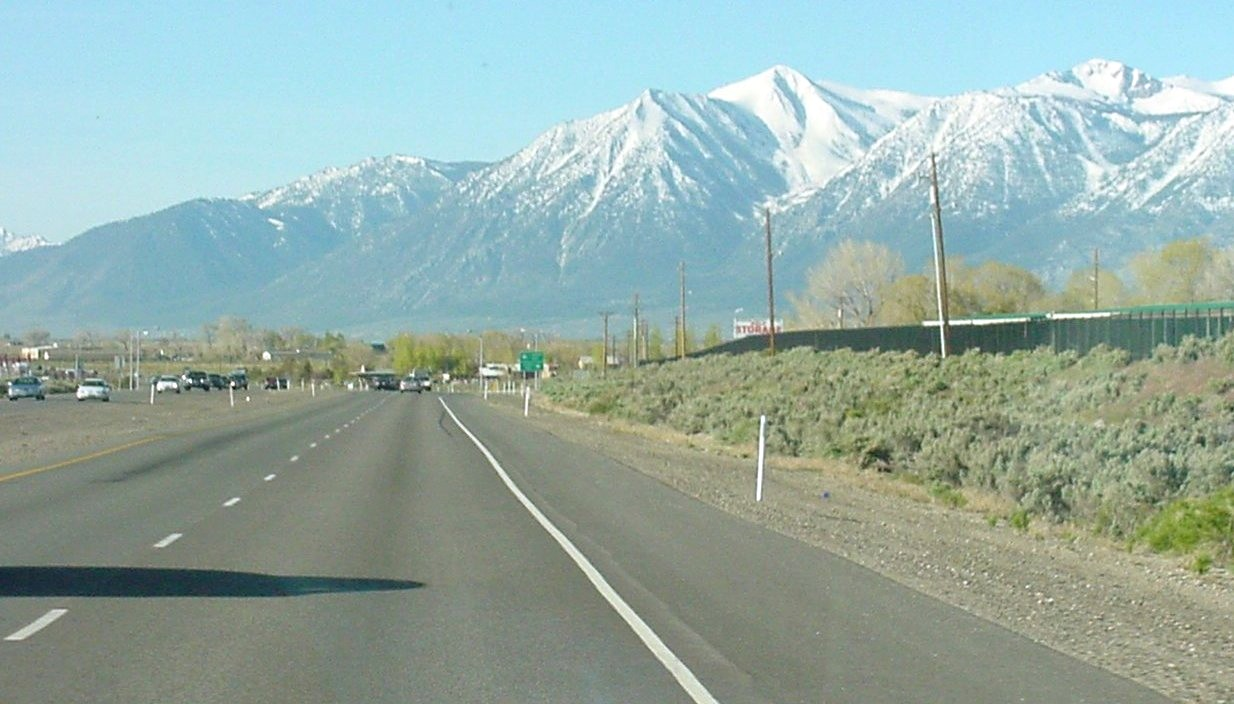
Jobs Peak and Jobs Sister (upper right corner) from southbound Highway 395
