= Jobs Peak =

Mountain in Alpine County, California, USA

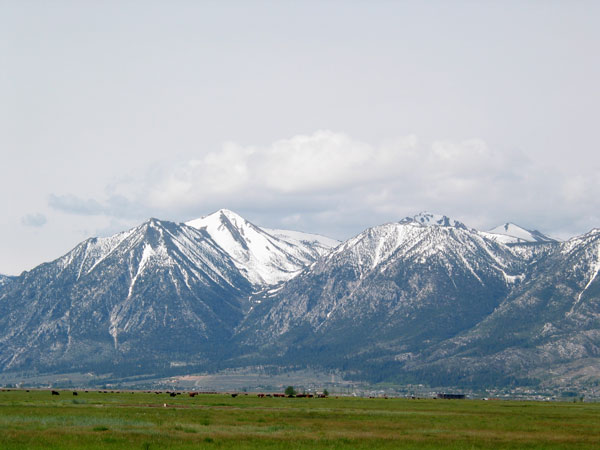

Highest point
- Elevation: 10,638 ft (3,242 m) NAVD 88
- Prominence: 793 ft (242 m)
- Listing: Great Basin Peaks List; Tahoe OGUL Star Peak
- Coordinates: 38°51′28″N 119°51′41″W

Geography
- Location within California
- Location: Alpine County, California, U.S.
- Parent range: Carson Range
- Topo map: USGS Woodfords

Climbing
- Easiest route: Scramble (class 2)

Jobs Peak (/dʒoʊbs/; Northern Paiute: Wangikudak) located in Alpine County, California, is the most prominent peak visible from the Carson Valley in Douglas County, Nevada. The peak offers hiking and backcountry skiing with the view of Lake Tahoe. It is in the Humboldt-Toiyabe National Forest.

The mountain is named for Moses Job who opened a store in nearby Sheridan, Nevada in the early 1850s.

== Gallery ==
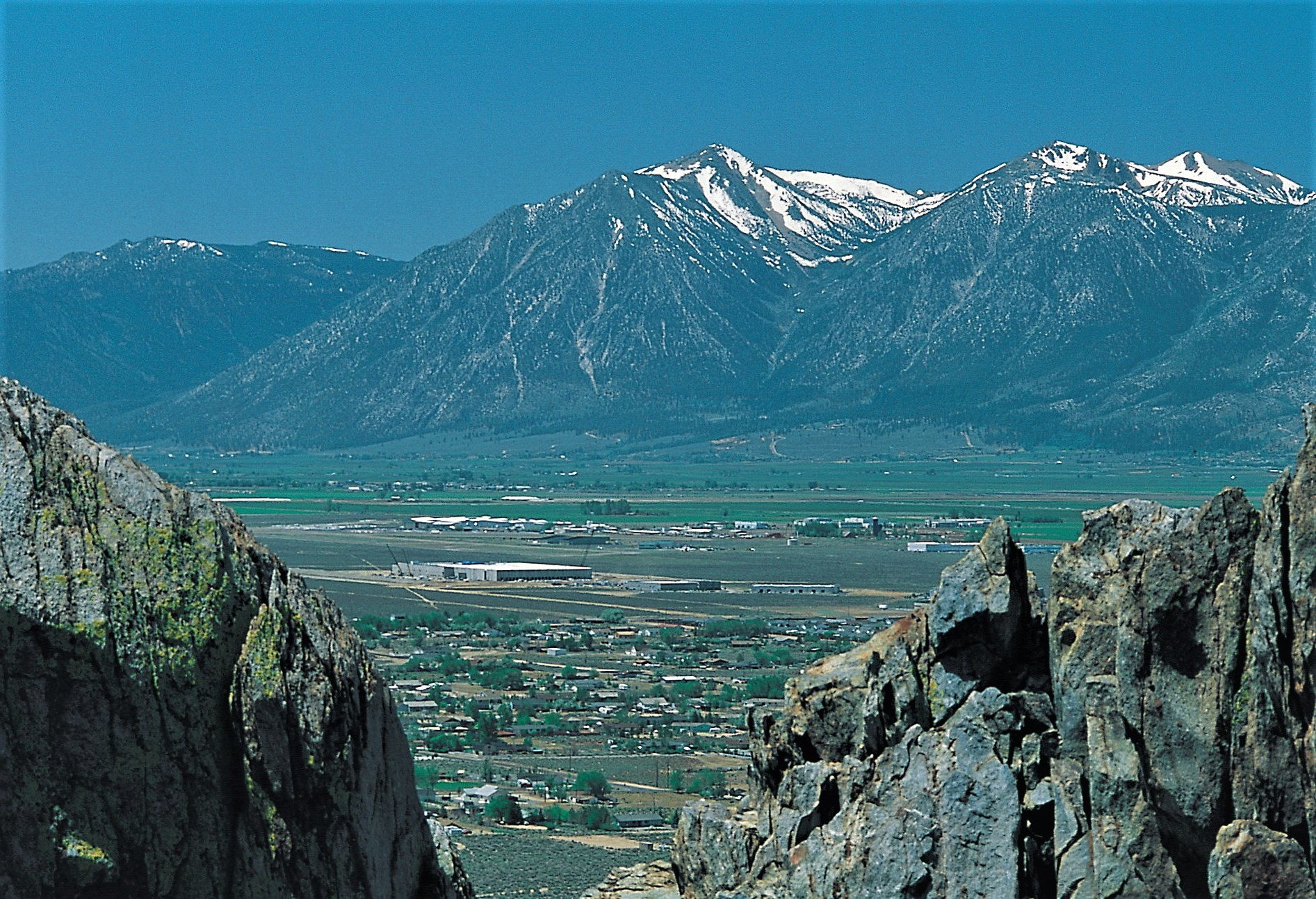
Jobs Peak (center), Jobs Sister, and Freel Peak rise above Carson Valley

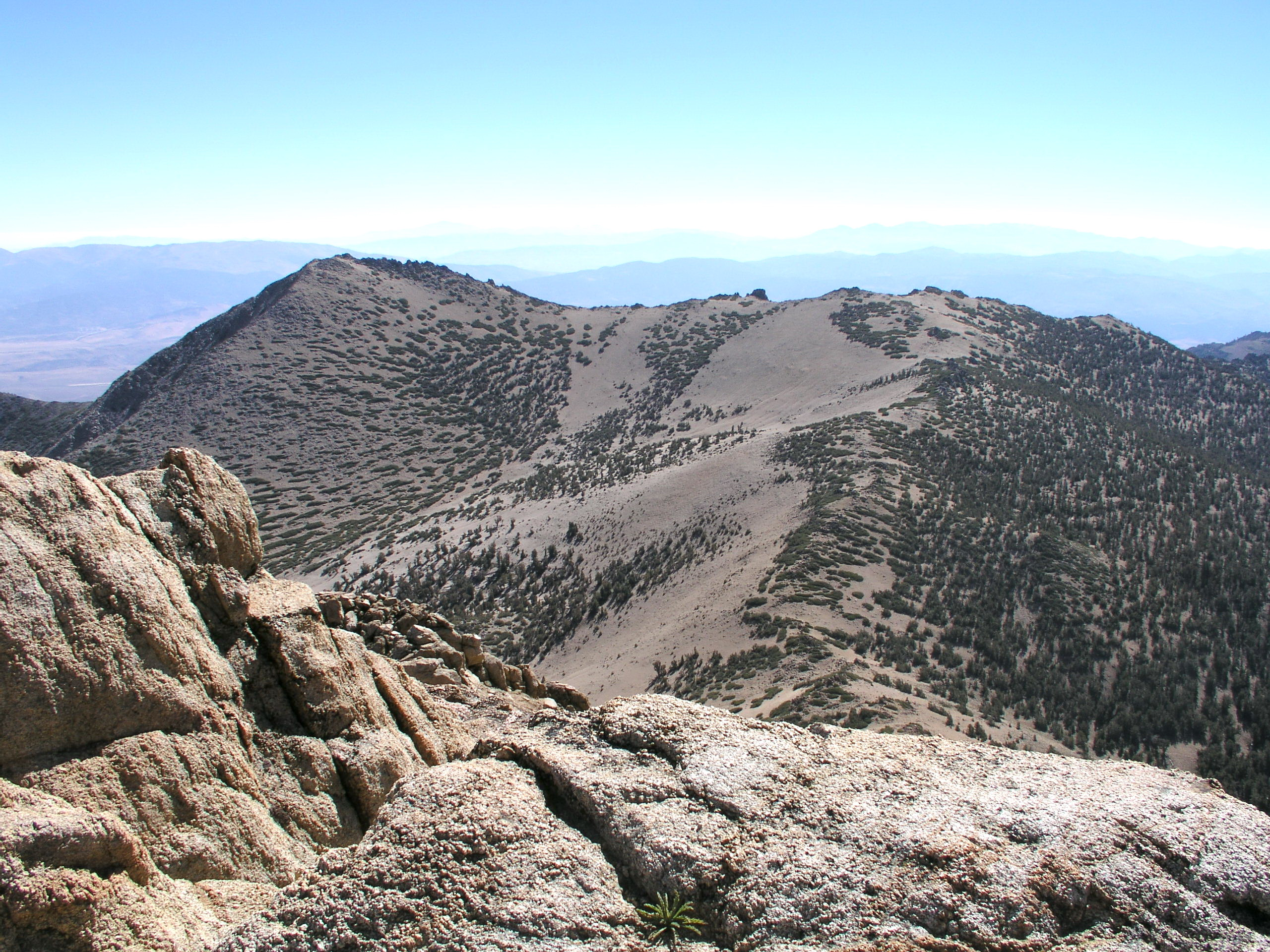
Jobs Peak seen from Jobs Sister

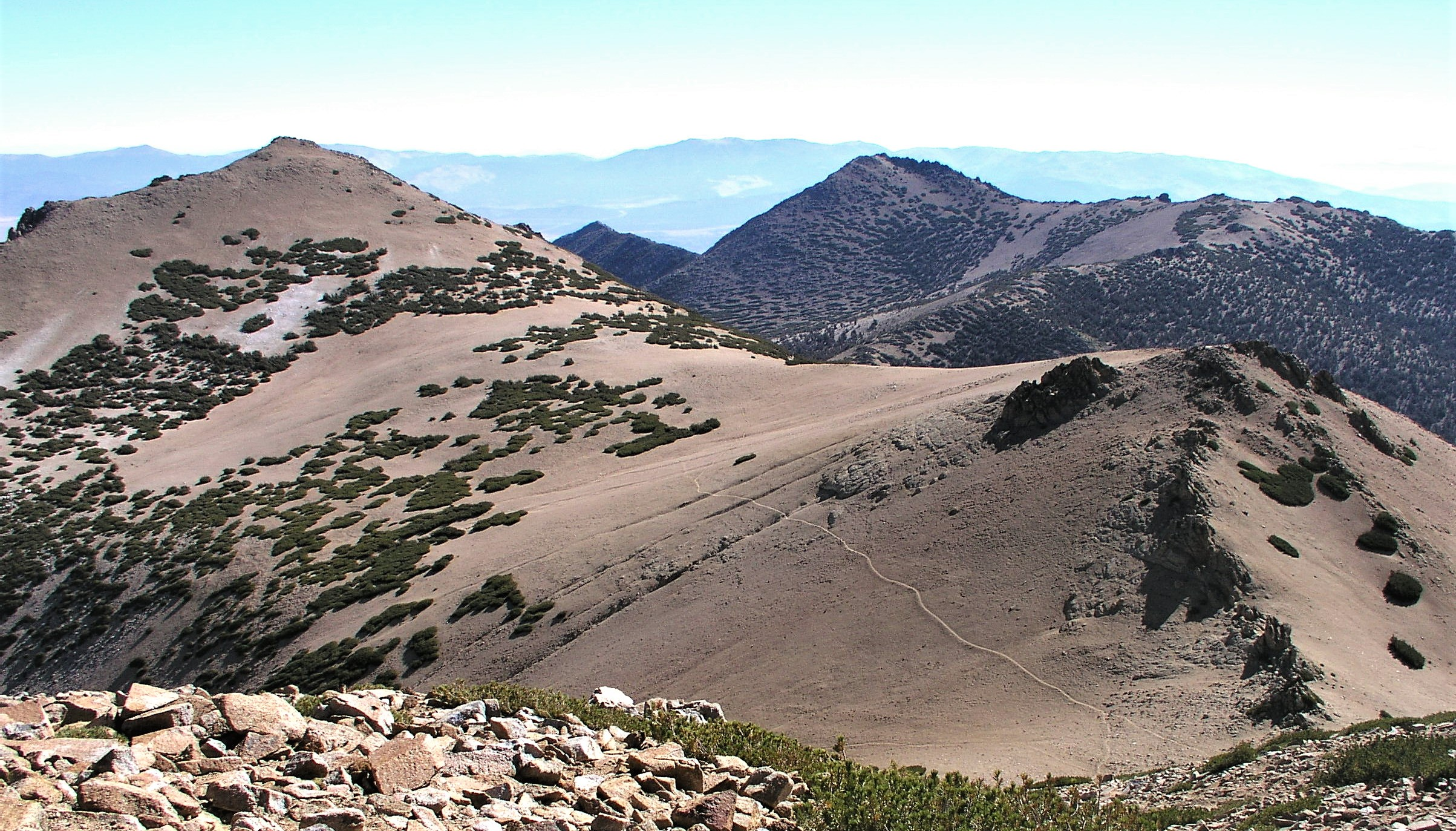
Jobs Sister (left) and Jobs Peak (right of center) seen from Freel Peak
