= Jobs =

Jobs may refer to:

- Job, an activity that people do for regular income gain

== People ==
Jobs is a surname mainly of German origin, some notable people with the surname include:

- Steve Jobs (1955–2011), co-founder and former CEO of Apple Inc.
- Eve Jobs (born 1998), American fashion model, daughter of Steve Jobs
- Laurene Powell Jobs (born 1963), American billionaire businesswoman and executive, widow of Steve Jobs
- Lisa Brennan-Jobs (born 1978), American writer, daughter of Steve Jobs
- Reed Jobs (born 1991), American venture capitalist, son of Steve Jobs

== Arts and entertainment ==
- Jobs (film), a 2013 biographical film based on the life of Steve Jobs
- Jobs, a major character from K. A. Applegate's Remnants series
- Jobs, a character in the anime and manga series Eureka Seven
- Final Fantasy character jobs, character classes in the Final Fantasy video game series

== Places in the United States ==
- Jobs, Ohio, an unincorporated community
- Jobs Peak, a mountain in California

== Other uses ==
- Job Brothers & Co., Limited, commonly referred to as Jobs, a mercantile empire in Newfoundland
- .jobs, a top-level internet domain
- Jumpstart Our Business Startups Act, a law intended to encourage funding of United States small businesses

== See also ==
- Job (disambiguation)
