= The Job =

The Job may refer to:

== Film and television ==
- The Job (2003 film), an action film starring Daryl Hannah
- The Job (2009 film), a dark comedy starring Patrick Flueger
- The Job, a 2005 short film featuring Marysia Kay
- The Job (2001 TV series), an American comedy-drama starring Denis Leary
- The Job (2013 TV series), a cancelled American reality competition show
- "The Job" (The Office), an episode of The Office (U.S.)
- "The Job" (The Amazing World of Gumball), an episode of The Amazing World of Gumball

== Literature ==
- The Job (novel), a 1917 novel by Sinclair Lewis
- The Job (police newspaper), the official newspaper of London's Metropolitan Police Service
- The Job: Interviews with William S. Burroughs, a 1969 book by Daniel Odier
- The Job, a 1998 novel by Douglas Kennedy

== See also ==
- La Job, a Quebec adaptation of the British TV series The Office
- Job (disambiguation)
