= The Job (police newspaper) =

Cover of The Job, August 2006 issue

The Job is the official newspaper of London's Metropolitan Police Service.

The newspaper was first published on 11 November 1967 and was initially published by the Public Relations Department of the Metropolitan Police. Up until March 2006, the paper was published every two weeks by Trident Communications, on behalf of the Metropolitan Police. In 2006, the contract to publish The Job was won by Square One Publishing.

It is now a free monthly magazine primarily intended for officers and police staff.
