= Joby =

Joby is a given name, sometimes a short form (hypocorism) of Joseph. Notable people with the name include:

- Joby Baker (born 1934), Canadian born actor and painter
- Joby Godfrey (1894–1977), English professional footballer
- Joby Harold, English film director and screenwriter currently living in Los Angeles
- Joby Harris (born 1975), California-based visual artist; guitar player and singer for band Crash Rickshaw
- Joby Harte, British television personality
- Joby Ingram-Dodd (born 1980), former Welsh racing cyclist
- Joby Messier (born 1970), professional ice hockey player
- Joby Ogwyn (born 1974), American mountain climber from Santa Barbara, California
- Joby Talbot (born 1971), British composer
- Joby Wright (born 1950), American former college and professional basketball player

== See also ==
- Jobi (disambiguation)
- Jobe (disambiguation)
