= Get a life =

Get a life or Get a Life may refer to:

- Get a life (idiom), an idiom and catchphrase usually intended as a taunt

== Film and television ==
- Get a Life (film), a 2001 Portuguese film
- Get a Life, a 2006 film by Toby Ross
- Get a Life (American TV series), a 1990–1992 American sitcom
- Get a Life, a 2007 British programme presented by Jodie Marsh
- Get a Life!, a 2012 documentary about Star Trek fandom starring William Shatner

== Literature ==
- Get a Life (novel), a 2005 novel by Nadine Gordimer
- Get a Life!, a 1995 book by Wayne Roberts
- Get a Life!, a 1999 book by William Shatner

== Music ==
=== Albums ===
- Get a Life (Doug Sahm album) or the title song, 1998
- Get a Life (Stiff Little Fingers album) or the title song, 1994
- Get a Life (Vice Squad album) or the title song, 1999

=== Songs ===
- "Get a Life" (Soul II Soul song), 1989
- "Get a Life", by Built to Spill from Ultimate Alternative Wavers, 1993
- "Get a Life", by FireHouse from 3, 1995
- "Get a Life", by the Freestylers from Raw as Fuck, 2004
- "Get-A-Life", by Gorefest from False, 1992
- "Get a Life", by Julian Lennon from Help Yourself, 1991
- "Get a Life", by Lil Wayne from Rebirth, 2010
- "Get a Life", by Limp Bizkit from Gold Cobra, 2011

== Other media ==
- Get a Life, a comic strip on the GoComics web site

== See also ==
- "Get a Life – Get Alive", a song by Eric Papilaya
