= Jobe Township, Oregon County, Missouri =

Township in Oregon County, Missouri, U.S.

Coordinates: 36.5967°N 91.2581°W

Jobe Township is an inactive township in Oregon County, in the south of the U.S. state of Missouri.

Jobe Township has the name of Eli Job, an early settler.
