= Occupation =

Occupation commonly refers to:

- Occupation (human activity), or job, one's role in society, often a regular activity performed for payment
- Occupation (protest), political demonstration by holding public or symbolic spaces
- Military occupation, the martial control of a territory

Occupation or The Occupation may also refer to:

== Arts and entertainment ==
- Occupation (2018 film), an Australian film
- Occupation (2021 film), a Czech comedy drama film
- Occupation (TV series), a 2009 British drama about the Iraq War
- "Occupation" (Battlestar Galactica), a 2006 television episode
- "The Occupation" (Star Wars Rebels), a 2017 television episode
- The Occupation, a 2019 video game
- The Occupation, a 2019 novel by Deborah Swift
- My Name Is Sara, also known as The Occupation, a 2019 American biographical drama film

== See also ==
- Career, a course through life
- Craft
- Employment, a relationship wherein a person serves of another by hire
- Job (disambiguation)
- Occupy (disambiguation)
- Position (disambiguation)
- Profession, a vocation
- Standard Occupational Classification System
- Trade
- Vocation, an occupation to which a person is specially drawn
