= Jobbins =

Jobbins is a surname. Notable people with the surname include:

- Boak Jobbins (1947–2012), Australian Anglican cleric
- Joy Jobbins (1927–2023), Australian writer
- Sheridan Jobbins (born 1960), Australian journalist, television presenter, and screenwriter
