= Freel Peak =

Mountain near Lake Tahoe, California, USA

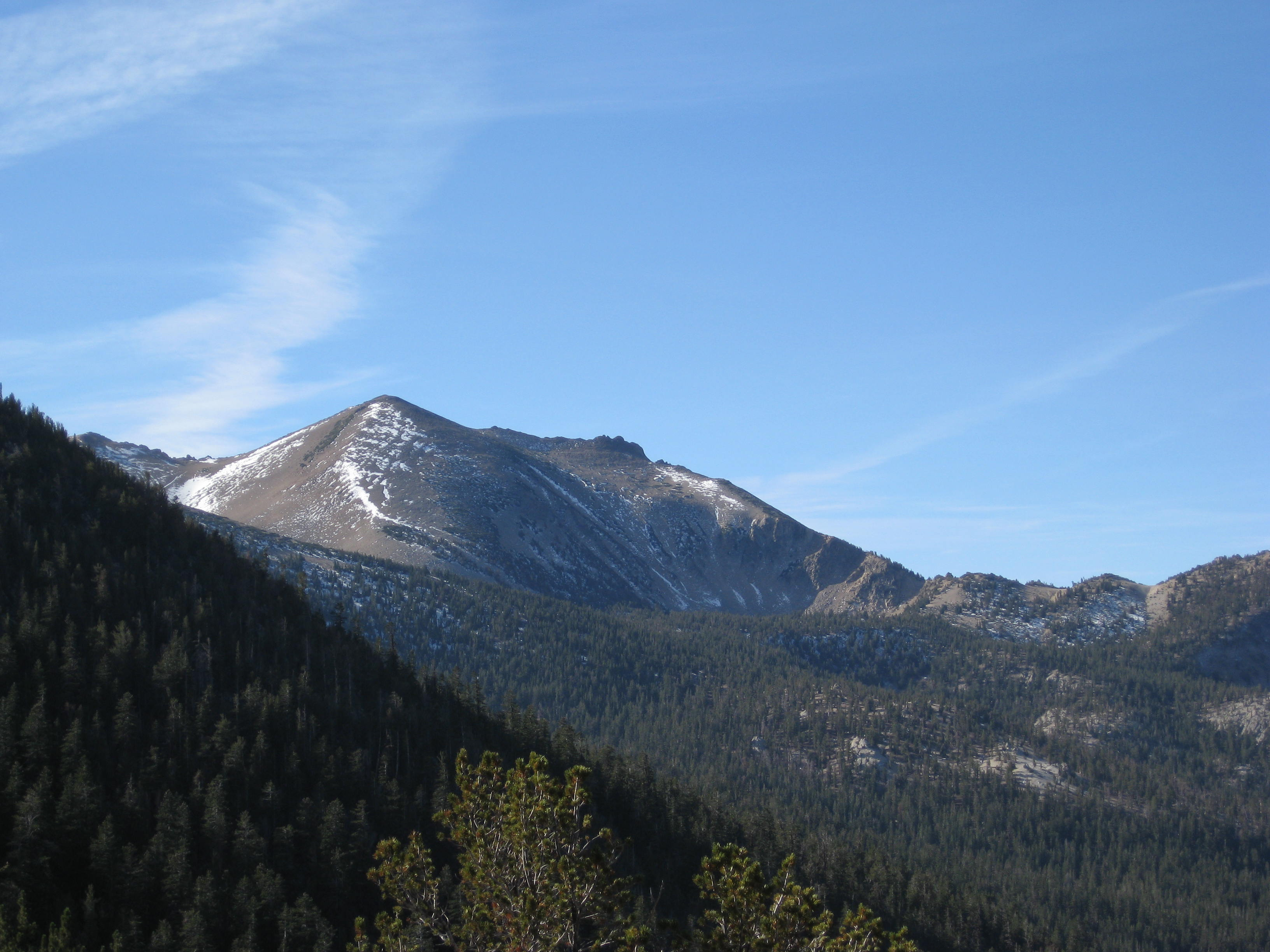
- Freel Peak from the Tahoe Rim Trail

Highest point
- Elevation: 10,886 ft (3,318 m) NAVD 88
- Prominence: 3,146 ft (959 m)
- Isolation: 22.95 mi (36.93 km)
- Listing: California county high points 11th; Tahoe-Ogul Peaks List; California Peaks with 1000 feet of Prominence
- Coordinates: 38°51′27″N 119°54′01″W

Geography
- Location within California Location within the United States
- Location: El Dorado and Alpine counties, California, U.S.
- Parent range: Carson Range
- Topo map: USGS Freel Peak

Climbing
- Easiest route: Scramble, class 2

Freel Peak is a mountain located in the Carson Range, a spur of the Sierra Nevada, near Lake Tahoe in California.

The peak is on the boundary between El Dorado County and Alpine County; and the boundary between the Eldorado National Forest and the Humboldt-Toiyabe National Forest. At 10,886 feet (3,318 m), it is the tallest summit in the Carson Range, El Dorado County, and the Tahoe Basin. Due to its elevation, most of the precipitation that falls on the mountain is snow.

In 1893, the U.S. Geological Survey assigned the name Freel Peak to what was then known as Jobs Peak. James Freel was an early settler in the area.

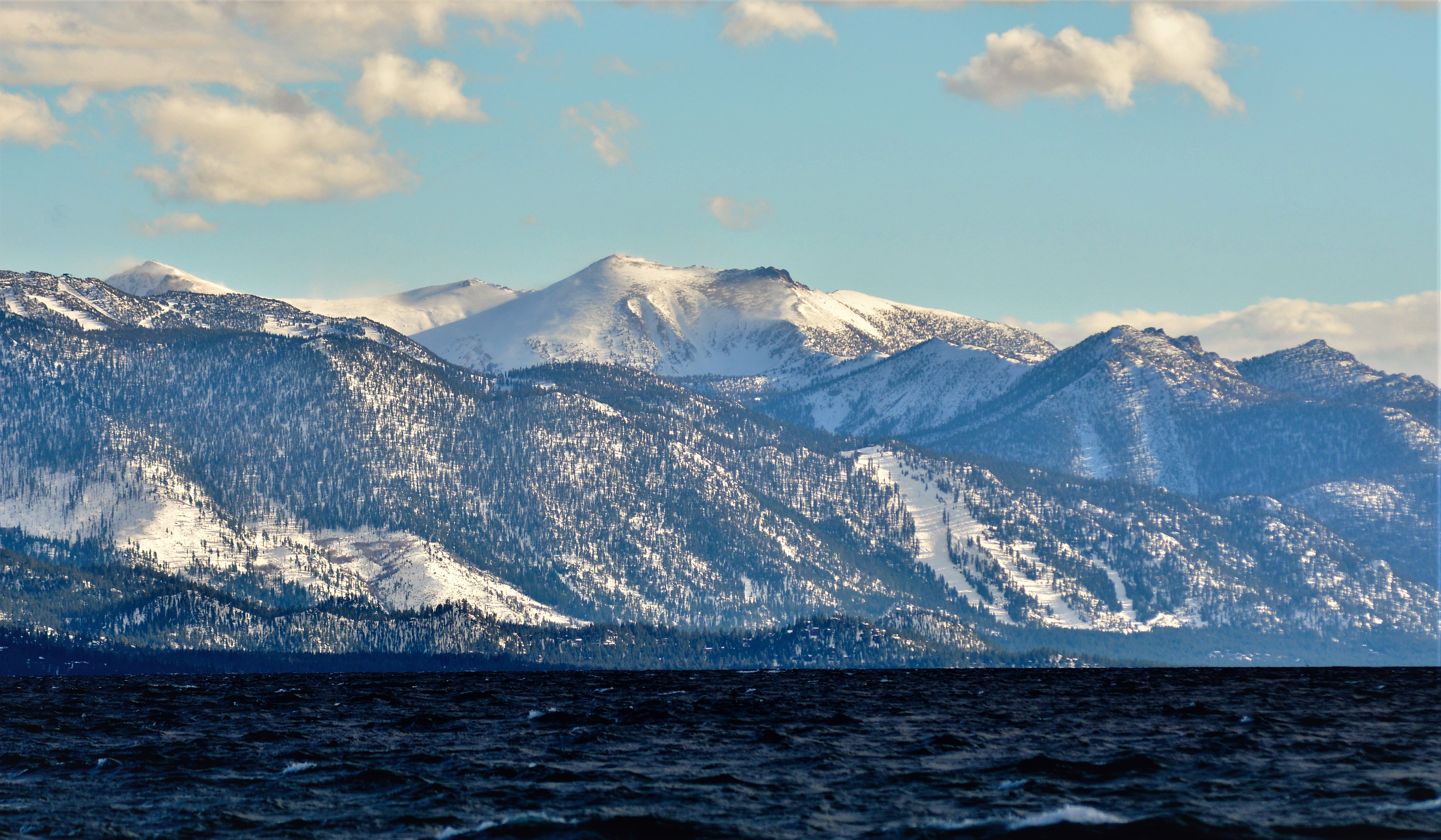
Freel Peak and Lake Tahoe

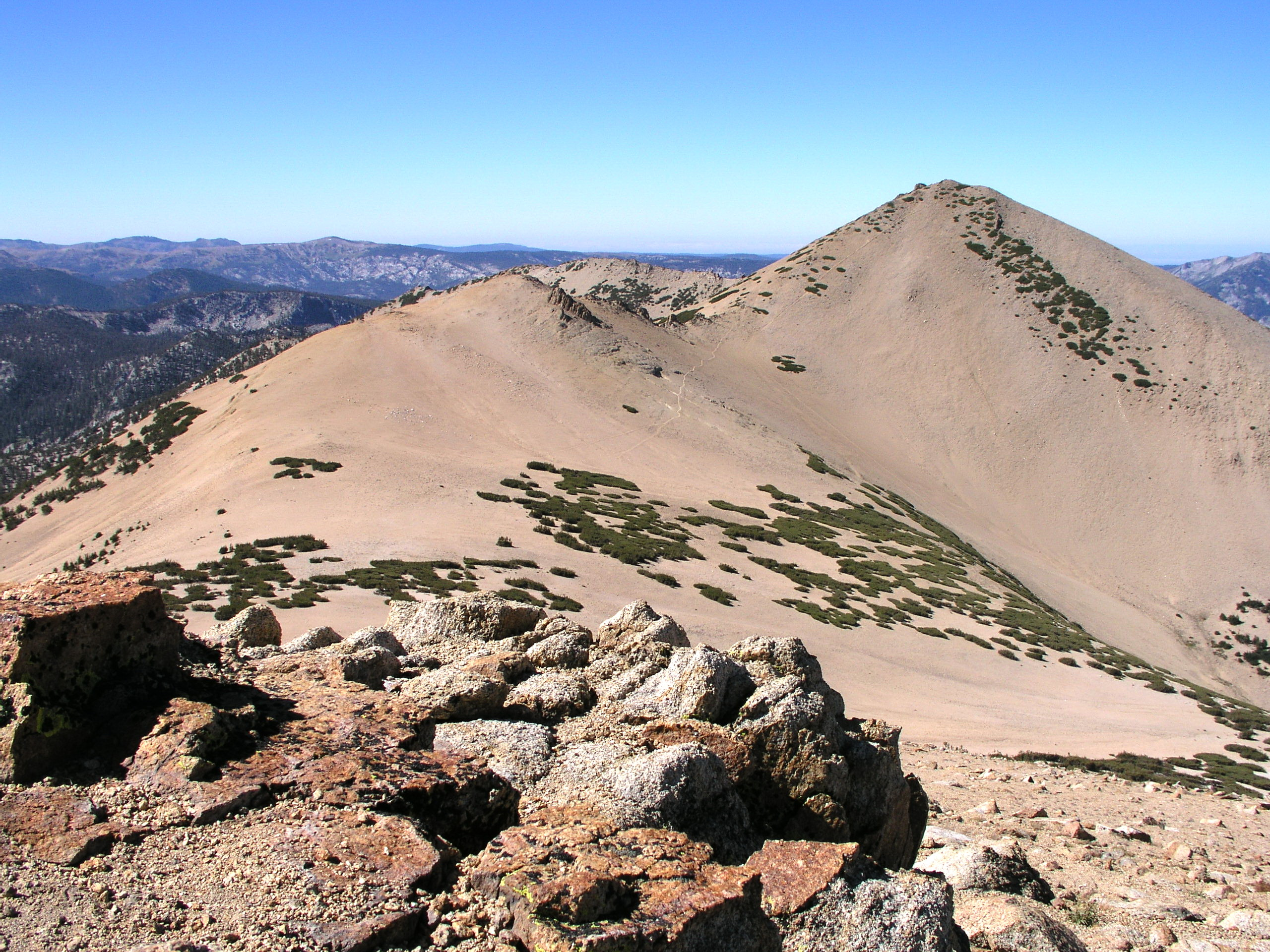
Freel Peak seen from Jobs Sister

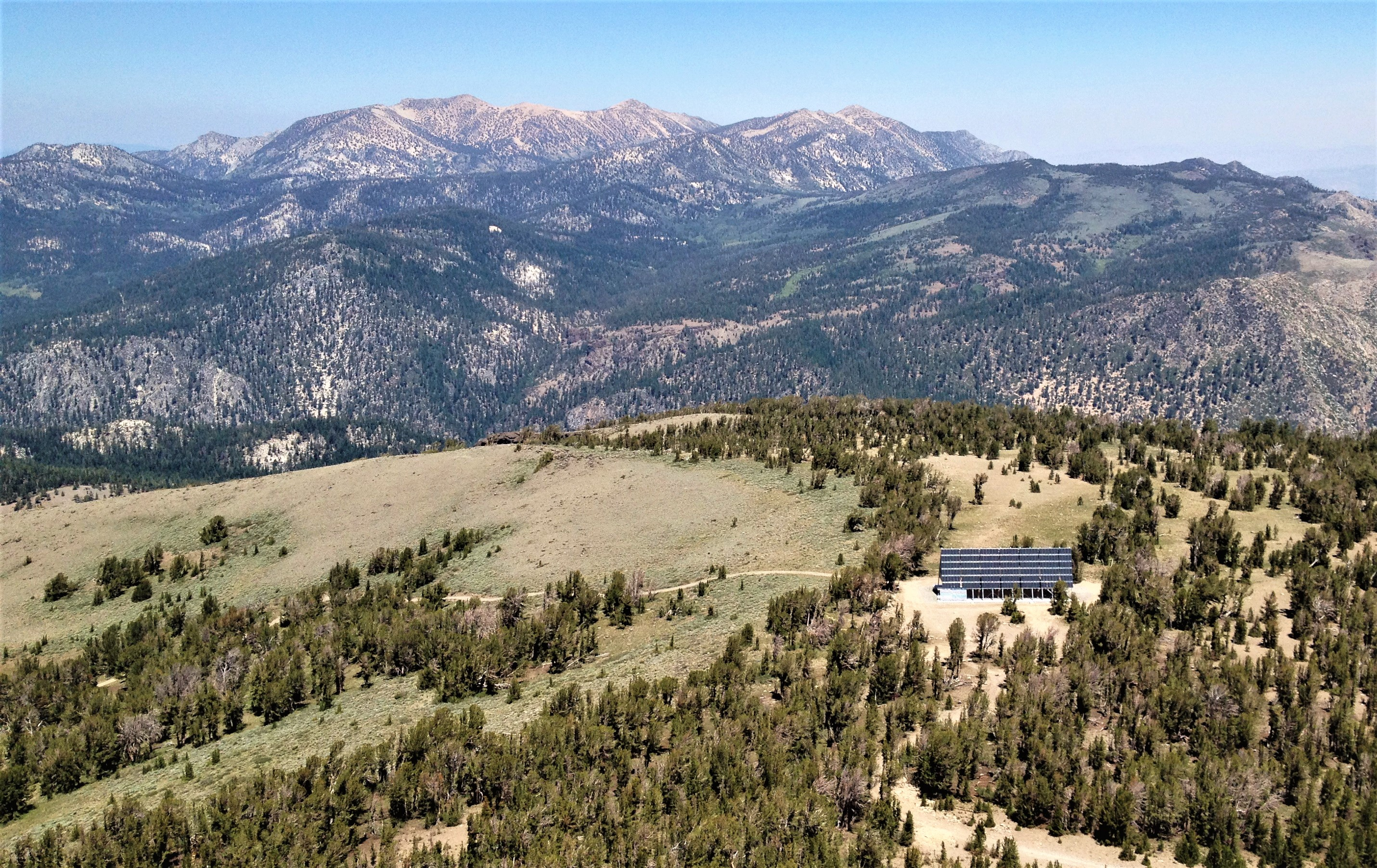
Freel Peak, Jobs Sister, and Jobs Peak seen from Hawkins Peak.

== Climate ==
According to the Köppen climate classification system, Freel Peak is located in an alpine climate zone. Most weather fronts originate in the Pacific Ocean, and travel east toward the Sierra Nevada mountains. As fronts approach, they are forced upward by the peaks (orographic lift), causing them to drop their moisture in the form of rain or snowfall onto the range.

Climate data for Freel Peak 38.8613 N, 119.9011 W, Elevation: 10,404 ft (3,171 m) (1991–2020 normals)
Month	Jan	Feb	Mar	Apr	May	Jun	Jul	Aug	Sep	Oct	Nov	Dec	Year
Mean daily maximum °F (°C)	33.2 (0.7)	31.8 (−0.1)	34.1 (1.2)	38.4 (3.6)	46.5 (8.1)	56.6 (13.7)	65.8 (18.8)	65.1 (18.4)	59.0 (15.0)	49.2 (9.6)	38.7 (3.7)	32.8 (0.4)	45.9 (7.8)
Daily mean °F (°C)	24.3 (−4.3)	22.3 (−5.4)	24.3 (−4.3)	27.4 (−2.6)	34.8 (1.6)	43.9 (6.6)	52.2 (11.2)	51.4 (10.8)	46.1 (7.8)	37.4 (3.0)	29.3 (−1.5)	24.2 (−4.3)	34.8 (1.5)
Mean daily minimum °F (°C)	15.4 (−9.2)	12.8 (−10.7)	14.4 (−9.8)	16.3 (−8.7)	23.1 (−4.9)	31.2 (−0.4)	38.7 (3.7)	37.8 (3.2)	33.1 (0.6)	25.5 (−3.6)	20.0 (−6.7)	15.5 (−9.2)	23.6 (−4.6)
Average precipitation inches (mm)	6.57 (167)	5.85 (149)	5.51 (140)	2.94 (75)	2.43 (62)	0.94 (24)	0.49 (12)	0.49 (12)	0.74 (19)	2.18 (55)	3.79 (96)	6.57 (167)	38.5 (978)
Source: PRISM Climate Group
