= Jobe =

Jobe is both a surname and a given name. Notable people with the name include:

== Surname ==
- Ann Wynia (born 1943), née Jobe, American former politician
- Bai Jobe (born 2004), Senegalese-born American football player
- Ben Jobe, American former men's college basketball head coach
- Brandt Jobe (born 1965), American golfer
- Bubacarr Jobe, (born 1994) Gambian football player
- Frank Jobe, American orthopedic surgeon who performed the first "Tommy John surgery"
- Georges Jobé (born 1961), five-time FIM motocross world champion from Belgium
- Jackson Jobe (born 2002), American baseball player
- Jane Annette Jobe (born 1947), known as Sami Jo, American country singer
- Josh Jobe (born 1998), American football player
- Kari Jobe (born 1981), American Christian singer and songwriter
- Maba Jobe (1965–2023), Gambian army officer and politician
- Modou Jobe, Gambian footballer
- Molly Jobe, American actress and singer
- Momodou Lamin Sedat Jobe (1944–2025), Foreign Minister of Gambia from 1998 to 2001
- Stanley Pruet Jobe, American businessman

== Given name ==
- Jobe Bellingham (born 2005), English footballer
- JoBe Cerny (born 1947), voice and character actor, producer and director, best known as the voice of the Pillsbury Doughboy
- Jobe Watson (born 1985), Australian rules footballer
- Jobe Wheelhouse (born 1985), Australian footballer

== See also ==
- Joby, a given name
- Jobe's test, used in medical examinations
