= Jobs, Ohio =

Unincorporated community in Ohio, U.S.

Coordinates: 39°30′01″N 82°10′45″W

Jobs is an unincorporated community in Hocking County, in the U.S. state of Ohio.

== History ==
Jobs was named after William Job (1843–1931) who was once one of the most prominent coal company operators in the Hocking Valley. It had several mines, a row of houses, a school and a post office was established in 1890, and remained in operation until 1924. The train station was on the Brush Fork Branch of the Hocking Valley Railway.

On May 13, 1892, the residents of Jobs broke the world record for mining coal in a single day with 4,888 tons loaded into 243 cars. The mines were owned by the Morris Coal Company at the time.

The mines were last operated by the Sunday Creek Coal Company, who recently sold the land to the state of Ohio. It is now managed by the Ohio Department of Natural Resources and is being turned into a wildlife area.
