= Jobbing =

Jobbing may refer to:

- selling stocks and shares as a stockjobber
- jobbing press, a variety of printing press used in letterpress printing used for work other than books and journals (e. g. hand bills, trade cards, etc.)
- losing or lying down in professional wrestling, see Job (professional wrestling)

== See also ==
- Jobber (disambiguation)
