= Herbert K. Job =

American conservationist (1864–1933)

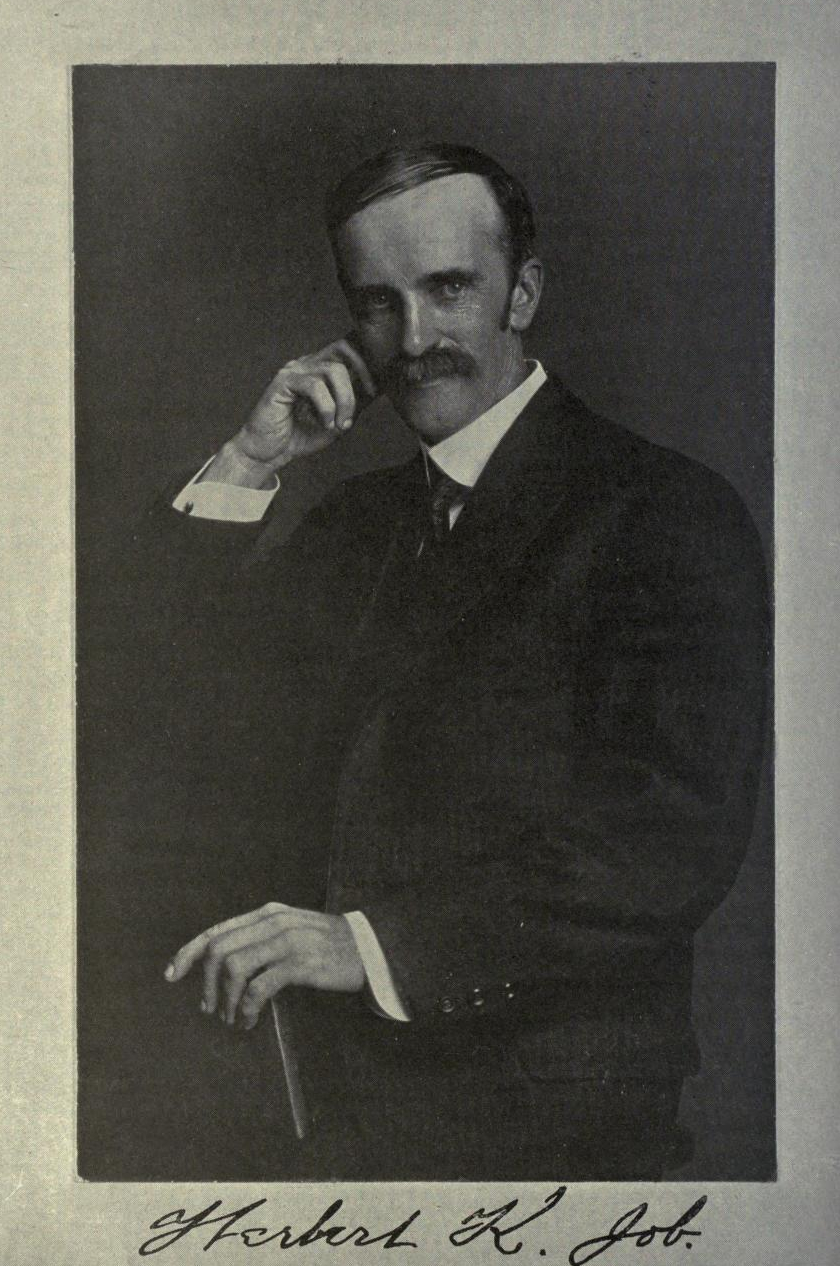
In 1915

Herbert Keightley Job (November 29, 1864 – June 17, 1933) was an American lecturer, bird photographer, conservationist, and writer who worked as an economic ornithologist in Connecticut.

== Life and career ==
Job was born in Boston, Massachusetts, to Daniel Ward and Susan Grey (née Adams) Job. He received a BA from Harvard in 188 and graduated from the Hartford Theological Seminary in 1891 and became a Congressional pastor in N. Middleboro, Massachusetts, and later in Connecticut. He became the state ornithologist for Connecticut and also served as faculty at the Connecticut Agricultural College from 1908 to 1914 and served as an economic ornithologist from 1914 to 1924. He also established an ornithological station at Amston, Connecticut, and served as a field agent for the Audubon Society in South Carolina. He married Elsie Anne Curtiss (1865) on September 10, 1891, at Mayville and they had a son and a daughter.

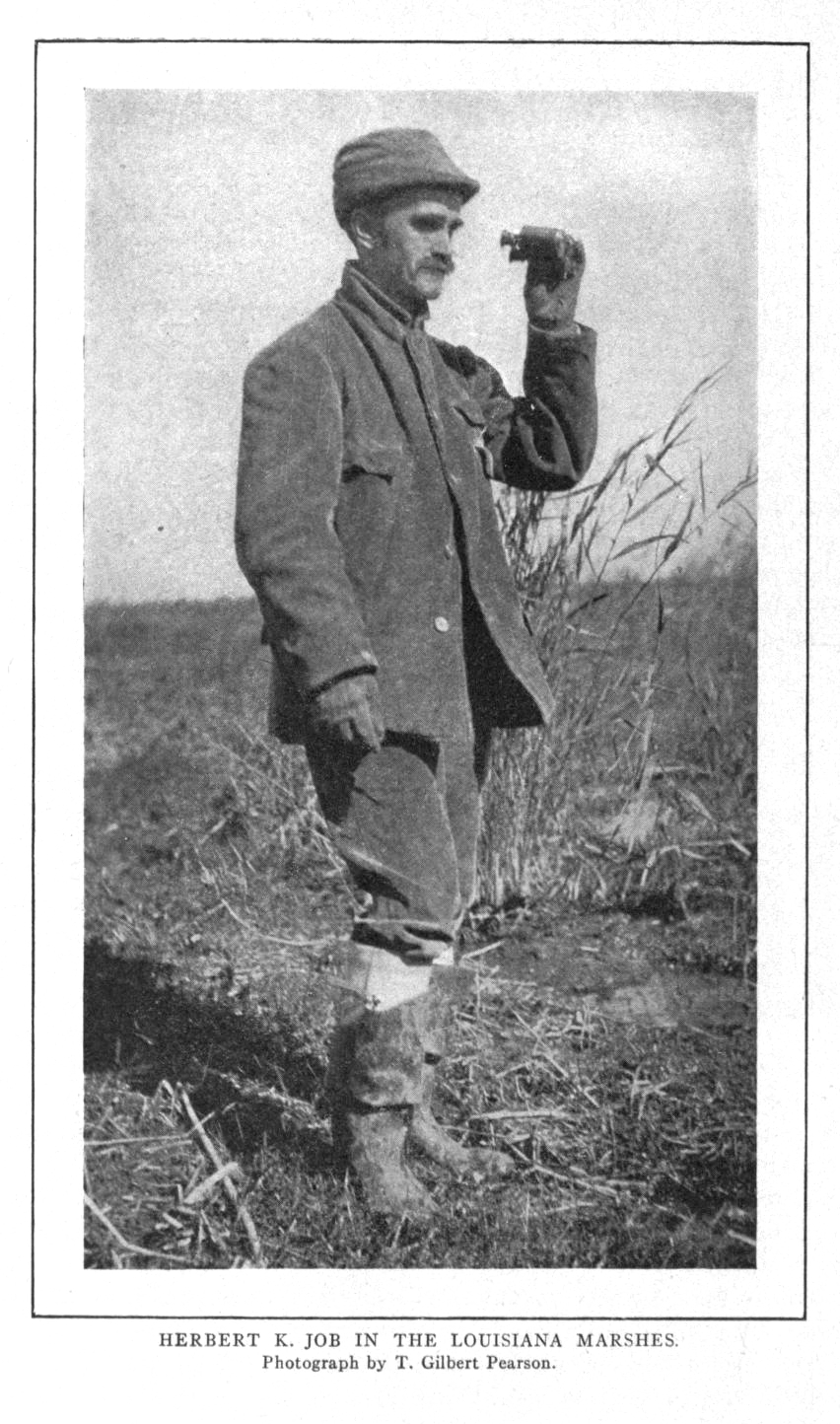
Job c. 1917

=== Conservation work ===
Job was an early promoter of bird conservation, to him birds were creations of God and citizens had a "holy obligation" to protect them and their nests. He sought the protection of the Florida Keys and considered it a memorial to John James Audubon. He followed on the footsteps of Audubon but where Audubon had shot birds with a gun, he took photographs. Job called for a move away from hunting and towards photography as a substitute sport. Job's book Wild Wings (1905) caught the fancy of Theodore Roosevelt who created the Key West National Wildlife Refuge in 1908. In June 1915, Job accompanied Roosevelt on a visit to the beaches of Louisiana, taking photos which are now archived in the Library of Congress. Job's visit to Florida was financed by his church.

He lectured on birds around the United States (including Virginia), while also photographing birds in the wild, and wrote several books. Among these, Wild Wings published in 1905 included a preface by Roosevelt, a fellow Harvard student.
