= Job =

Job or JOB may refer to:

== Activity ==
- Job (role), activity done by a person to earn money
  - Job, slang for a crime, especially a robbery
- Job (professional wrestling), in professional wrestling, the act of losing a match

== People ==
- Job (given name)
- Job (surname)

== Religion ==
- Book of Job, part of the Hebrew Bible
  - Job (biblical figure), the central character in the Book of Job
- Job in Islam, a prophet in Islam

== Places ==
- Job, Kentucky, an unincorporated community in the US
- Job, Puy-de-Dôme, a commune in central France

== Arts and entertainment ==
=== Literature ===
- Job (novel), by Joseph Roth
- Job: A Comedy of Justice, a novel by Robert A. Heinlein

=== Television ===
- "Job" (Barbara), a 1995 television episode
- "Job" (Miranda), a 2009 television episode
- "Job" (Shifting Gears), a 2025 television episode

=== Other arts and entertainment ===
- Job (Shea), a sculpture by Judith Shea
- Job, a 1950 opera by Luigi Dallapiccola
- Job, an 1892 oratorio by Hubert Parry
- Job: A Masque for Dancing, a ballet by Ralph Vaughan Williams
- Job (play), by Max Wolf Friedlich
- J.O.B. Records, a defunct record label which specialized in blues and R&B

== Computing ==
- Job (computing) or job stream, a unit of work in a computer processing environment
- Job (Unix), a representation of a process group for process control in a Unix shell

== Other uses ==
- JOB (rolling papers), a brand of cigarette paper

== See also ==
- The Job (disambiguation)
- Jobs (disambiguation)
- Jobbing (disambiguation)
- Jobber (disambiguation)
- Jobe
