= List of places in California (S) =

List of places in California - S

This list of current:

- cities
- towns, unincorporated communities
- counties, and other recognized places in the U.S. state of California.

Information on the number and names of counties in which the place lies, and its lower and upper ZIP Code bounds, if applicable are also included.

Name of place	Number of counties	Principal county	Lower zip code	Upper zip code
Sablon	1	San Bernardino County		
Sacramento	1	Sacramento County	95801	66
Sage	1	Riverside County	92544	
Sageland	1	Kern County		
Saint Helena	1	Napa County	94574	
Salida	1	Stanislaus County	95368	
Salinas	1	Monterey County	93901	62
Salmon Creek	1	Sonoma County	94923	
Saltdale	1	Kern County	93519	
Salton City	1	Imperial County	92274	
Salton Sea Beach	1	Imperial County	92274	
Saltus	1	San Bernardino County	92304	
Salyer	1	Trinity County	95563	
Samoa	1	Humboldt County	95564	
San Andreas	1	Calaveras County	95249	
San Anselmo	1	Marin County	94960	
San Antonio Heights	1	San Bernardino County	91786	
San Ardo	1	Monterey County	93450	
San Benito	1	San Benito County	95043	
San Bernardino	1	San Bernardino County	92401	99
San Bruno	1	San Mateo County	94066	
San Buenaventura	1	Ventura County	93001	07
San Carlos	1	San Mateo County	94070	
San Clemente	1	Orange County	92672	74
San Clemente Island	1	Los Angeles County		
Sandberg	1	Los Angeles County	93532	
Sand City	1	Monterey County	93955	
Sand Hill	1	Contra Costa County		
San Diego	1	San Diego County	92101	99
San Diego Country Estates	1	San Diego County		
San Dimas	1	Los Angeles County	91773	
Sandy Gulch	1	Calaveras County		
San Fernando	1	Los Angeles County	91340	46
San Francisco	1	San Francisco County	94101	88
San Gabriel	1	Los Angeles County	91775	78
Sanger	1	Fresno County	93657	
San Geronimo	1	Marin County	94963	
San Gregorio	1	San Mateo County	94074	
Sanitarium	1	Napa County		
San Jacinto	1	Riverside County	92581	83
San Joaquin	1	Fresno County	93660	
San Joaquin Hills	1	Orange County		
San Jose	1	Santa Clara County	95101	92
San Juan Bautista	1	San Benito County	95045	
San Juan Capistrano	1	Orange County	92675	93
San Juan Hot Springs	1	Orange County		
San Leandro	1	Alameda County	94577	79
San Lorenzo	1	Alameda County	94580	
San Lucas	1	Monterey County	93954	
San Luis Obispo	1	San Luis Obispo County	93401	12
San Luis Rey	1	San Diego County	92068	
San Manuel Indian Reservation	1	San Bernardino County	92346	
San Marcos	1	San Diego County	92069	96
San Marin	1	Marin County	94945	
San Marino	1	Los Angeles County	91108	
San Martin	1	Santa Clara County	95046	
San Mateo	1	San Mateo County	94401	99
San Miguel	1	San Luis Obispo County	93451	
San Onofre	1	San Diego County	92672	
San Pablo	1	Contra Costa County	94806	
San Pasqual	1	San Diego County	92025	
San Pedro	1	Los Angeles County	90731	34
San Quentin	1	Marin County	94964	
San Rafael	1	Marin County	94903	15
San Ramon	1	Contra Costa County	94583	
San Ramon Village	1	Alameda County		
San Roque	1	Santa Barbara County	93105	
San Simeon	1	San Luis Obispo County	93452	
Santa Ana	1	Orange County	92701	99
Santa Ana Heights	1	Orange County	92707	
Santa Anita	1	Los Angeles County	91006	
Santa Barbara	1	Santa Barbara County	93101	90
Santa Catalina Island	1	Los Angeles County		
Santa Clara	1	Santa Clara County	95050	56
Santa Clarita	1	Los Angeles County	91321	90
Santa Cruz	1	Santa Cruz County	95060	67
Santa Fe Springs	1	Los Angeles County	90670	
Santa Lucia Preserve	1	Monterey County	93923	
Santa Margarita	1	San Luis Obispo County	93453	
Santa Maria	1	Santa Barbara County	93454	57
Santa Monica	1	Los Angeles County	90400	99
Santa Nella	1	Merced County	95322	
Santa Nella Village	1	Merced County		
Santa Paula	1	Ventura County	93060	
Santa Rita	1	Monterey County	93901	
Santa Rita	1	Santa Barbara County	93436	
Santa Rita Park	1	Merced County	93661	
Santa Rosa	1	Sonoma County	95401	09
Santa Rosa Indian Reservation	1	Riverside County	92263	
Santa Susana	1	Ventura County	93063	
Santa Susana Knolls	1	Ventura County		
Santa Venetia	1	Marin County	94903	
Santa Ynez	1	Santa Barbara County	93460	
Santa Ynez Indian Reservation	1	Santa Barbara County	93460	
Santa Ysabel	1	San Diego County	92070	
Santa Ysabel Indian Reservation	1	San Diego County	92263	
Santee	1	San Diego County	92071	
San Ysidro	1	San Diego County	92154	73
Saranap	1	Contra Costa County	94596	
Saratoga	1	Santa Clara County	95070	
Saratoga Springs	1	Lake County		
Saticoy	1	Ventura County	93004	
Sattley	1	Sierra County	96124	
Saugus	1	Los Angeles County	91350	
Sausalito	1	Marin County	94965	
Scales	1	Sierra County		
Scheelite	1	Inyo County	93514	
Scheideck	1	Ventura County	93252	
Schellville	1	Sonoma County	95476	
Sciots Camp	1	El Dorado County		
Scotia	1	Humboldt County	95565	
Scott Bar	1	Siskiyou County	96085	
Scotts Valley	1	Santa Cruz County	95066	
Seacliff	1	Santa Cruz County	95003	
Sea Cliff	1	Ventura County		
Seal Beach	1	Orange County	90740	
Sea Ranch	1	Sonoma County		
Searles Valley	1	San Bernardino County	93562	
Sears Point	1	Sonoma County		
Seaside	1	Monterey County	93955	
Sebastopol	1	Nevada County		
Sebastopol	1	Sonoma County	95472	
Secret Town	1	Placer County		
Sedco Hills	1	Riverside County	92330	
Seeley	1	Imperial County	92273	
Seiad Valley	1	Siskiyou County	96086	
Seigler Springs	1	Lake County	95461	
Selby	1	Contra Costa County		
Selma	1	Fresno County	93662	
Seminole Hot Springs	1	Los Angeles County		
Seneca	1	Plumas County	95923	
Sepulveda	1	Los Angeles County	91343	
Sequoia Crest	1	Tulare County	93265	
Sequoia National Park	1	Tulare County	93262	
Seven Oaks	1	San Bernardino County	92305	
Seven Trees	1	Santa Clara County		
Seville	1	Tulare County	93291	
Shackelford	1	Stanislaus County		
Shadow Hills	1	Los Angeles County	91352	
Shady Glen	1	Placer County	95713	
Shafter	1	Kern County	93263	
Shake City	1	Mendocino County		
Shandon	1	San Luis Obispo County	93461	
Shasta	1	Shasta County	96087	
Shasta Lake	1	Shasta County	96019	
Shaver Lake	1	Fresno County	93664	
Sheepranch	1	Calaveras County	95250	
Sheep Ranch Rancheria	1	Calaveras County	95250	
Shell Beach	1	San Luis Obispo County	93449	
Shelter Cove	1	Humboldt County	95489	
Shelter Cove	1	San Mateo County	94044	
Sheridan	1	Placer County	95681	
Sherman Island	1	Sacramento County	94571	
Sherman Oaks	1	Los Angeles County	91403	
Shingle Springs	1	El Dorado County	95682	
Shingle Springs Rancheria	1	El Dorado County	95682	
Shingletown	1	Shasta County	96088	
Shinn	1	Alameda County		
Shipyard Acres	1	Napa County		
Shirley	1	Orange County	90630	
Shively	1	Humboldt County	95565	
Shore Acres	1	Contra Costa County	94565	
Shoshone	1	Inyo County	92384	
Siberia	1	San Bernardino County		
Sicard Flat	1	Yuba County		
Sierra City	1	Sierra County	96125	
Sierra Madre	1	Los Angeles County	91024	
Sierra Point	1	San Mateo County		
Sierra Sky Park	1	Fresno County		
Sierraville	1	Sierra County	96126	
Signal Hill	1	Los Angeles County	90806	
Silverado	1	Orange County	92676	
Silverado Canyon	1	Orange County		
Silver City	1	Tulare County	93271	
Simi Valley	1	Ventura County	93062	65
Simmler	1	San Luis Obispo County	93453	
Sims	1	Shasta County		
Sisquoc	1	Santa Barbara County	93454	
Sites	1	Colusa County	95979	
Skaggs Island	1	Sonoma County	95476	
Skidoo	1	Inyo County		
Skinners	1	El Dorado County		
Skyforest	1	San Bernardino County	92385	
Sky Londa	1	San Mateo County	94062	
Sky Valley	1	Riverside County	92240	
Sleepy Hollow	1	Marin County	94960	
Sleepy Hollow	1	San Bernardino County	91710	
Sloat	1	Plumas County	96127	
Sloughhouse	1	Sacramento County	95683	
Smartville	1	Yuba County	95977	
Smith Corner	1	Kern County		
Smithflat	1	El Dorado County	95667	
Smith Flat	1	El Dorado County		
Smith River	1	Del Norte County	95567	
Smith River Rancheria	1	Del Norte County		
Snelling	1	Merced County	95369	
Snow Creek	1	Riverside County	92282	
Sobrante	1	Contra Costa County		
Soda Bay	1	Lake County	95451	
Soda Springs	1	Mendocino County		
Soda Springs	1	Nevada County	95728	
Solana Beach	1	San Diego County	92075	
Soledad	1	Monterey County	93960	
Solromar	1	Ventura County	90265	
Solvang	1	Santa Barbara County	93463	
Somerset	1	El Dorado County	95684	
Somerset	1	Siskiyou County		
Somersville	1	Contra Costa County		
Somes Bar	1	Siskiyou County	95568	
Somis	1	Ventura County	93066	
Sonoma	1	Sonoma County	95476	
Sonora	1	Tuolumne County	95370	
Soquel	1	Santa Cruz County	95073	
Sorensens	1	Alpine County	96120	
Soulsbyville	1	Tuolumne County	95372	
South Berkeley	1	Alameda County	94703	
South Dos Palos	1	Merced County	93665	
South El Monte	1	Los Angeles County	91733	
South Fork	1	Humboldt County	95569	
South Fork	1	Madera County	93643	
South Gate	1	Los Angeles County	90280	
South Laguna	1	Orange County	92677	
South Lake	1	Kern County		
South Lake Tahoe	1	El Dorado County	96150	
South Leggett	1	Mendocino County		
South Los Angeles	1	Los Angeles County		
South Oroville	1	Butte County	95965	
South Park	1	Los Angeles County		
South Park	1	San Diego County		
South Park	1	Sonoma County	95404	
South Pasadena	1	Los Angeles County	91030	
South San Francisco	1	San Mateo County	94080	
South San Gabriel	1	Los Angeles County	91770	
South San Jose Hills	1	Los Angeles County	91744	
South Taft	1	Kern County	93268	
South Wawona	1	Mariposa County		
South Whittier	1	Los Angeles County	90605	
South Woodbridge	1	San Joaquin County		
South Yuba City	1	Sutter County		
Spadra	1	Los Angeles County		
Spalding Tract	1	Lassen County	96130	
Spanish Ranch	1	Plumas County	95956	
Spaulding Tract	1	Lassen County	96130	
Spicer City	1	Kern County	93206	
Spreckels	1	Monterey County	93962	
Springfield	1	Tuolumne County		
Springtown	1	Monterey County		
Spring Garden	1	Plumas County	95971	
Spring Valley	1	San Diego County	91976	79
Spring Valley Lake	1	San Bernardino County	92392	
Springville	1	Tulare County	93265	
Spruce Point	1	Humboldt County	95501	
Spyrock	1	Mendocino County		
Squaw Hill	1	Tehama County		
Squaw Valley	1	Fresno County	93675	
Squaw Valley	1	Placer County		
Squirrel Mountain Valley	1	Kern County		
Stacy	1	Lassen County		
Stafford	1	Humboldt County	95565	
Stallion Springs	1	Kern County	93561	
Standard	1	Tuolumne County	95373	
Standish	1	Lassen County	96128	
Stanford	1	Santa Clara County	94305	
Stanton	1	Orange County	90680	
State Capitol	1	Sacramento County	95814	
Stateline	1	El Dorado County	96157	
Stedman	1	San Bernardino County		
Stege	1	Contra Costa County		
Stevenson Ranch	1	Los Angeles County	91381	
Stevinson	1	Merced County	95374	
Stewarts Point	1	Sonoma County	95480	
Stewarts Point Rancheria	1	Sonoma County	95480	
Stewartville	1	Contra Costa County		
Stinson Beach	1	Marin County	94970	
Stirling City	1	Butte County	95978	
Stockton	1	San Joaquin County	95201	12
Stonyford	1	Colusa County	95979	
Stony Point	1	Sonoma County		
Storrie	1	Plumas County	95980	
Stove Pipe Wells	1	Inyo County	92328	
Stratford	1	Kings County	93266	
Strathmore	1	Tulare County	93267	
Strawberry	1	El Dorado County	95720	
Strawberry	1	Marin County		
Strawberry	1	Tuolumne County	95375	
Strawberry Manor	1	Marin County	94941	
Strawberry Valley	1	Yuba County	95981	
Stubbs	1	Lake County		
Studio City	1	Los Angeles County	91604	
Sugarloaf	1	San Bernardino County	92386	
Sugarload Mountain Park	1	Tulare County	93260	
Sugar Pine	1	Madera County	93644	
Suisun City	1	Solano County	94585	
Sultana	1	Tulare County	93666	
Summerland	1	Santa Barbara County	93067	
Summerville	1	Siskiyou County		
Summit City	1	Shasta County	96089	
Sun City	1	Riverside County	92586	
Sunfair	1	San Bernardino County	92252	
Sunfair Heights	1	San Bernardino County		
Sunland	1	Los Angeles County	91040	
Sunny Brae	1	Humboldt County	95521	
Sunnymead	1	Riverside County	92388	
Sunnyside	1	Fresno County	93702	
Sunnyside	1	Placer County		
Sunnyside-Tahoe City	1	Placer County		
Sunnyslope	1	Butte County		
Sunnyslope	1	Riverside County	92509	
Sunnyvale	1	Santa Clara County	94086	91
Sunol	1	Alameda County	94586	
Sunol-Midtown	1	Santa Clara County		
Sunset	1	San Francisco County	94122	
Sunset Beach	1	Orange County	90742	
Sun Valley	1	Los Angeles County	91352	
Sun Village	1	Los Angeles County	93543	
Surf	1	Santa Barbara County	93436	
Surfside	1	Orange County	90743	
Susanville	1	Lassen County	96130	
Susanville Indian Reservation	1	Lassen County	96130	
Sutter	1	Sutter County	95982	
Sutter Creek	1	Amador County	95685	
Sutter Hill	1	Amador County	95685	
Sveadal	1	Santa Clara County		
Swansea	1	Inyo County	93545	
Swanton	1	Santa Cruz County	95017	
Sweetland	1	Nevada County	95960	
Sycamore	1	Colusa County	95957	
Sylmar	1	Los Angeles County	91342	
