= Hope Valley (California) =

Mountain valley in Alpine County, California

Coordinates: 38°46′38″N 119°55′59″W

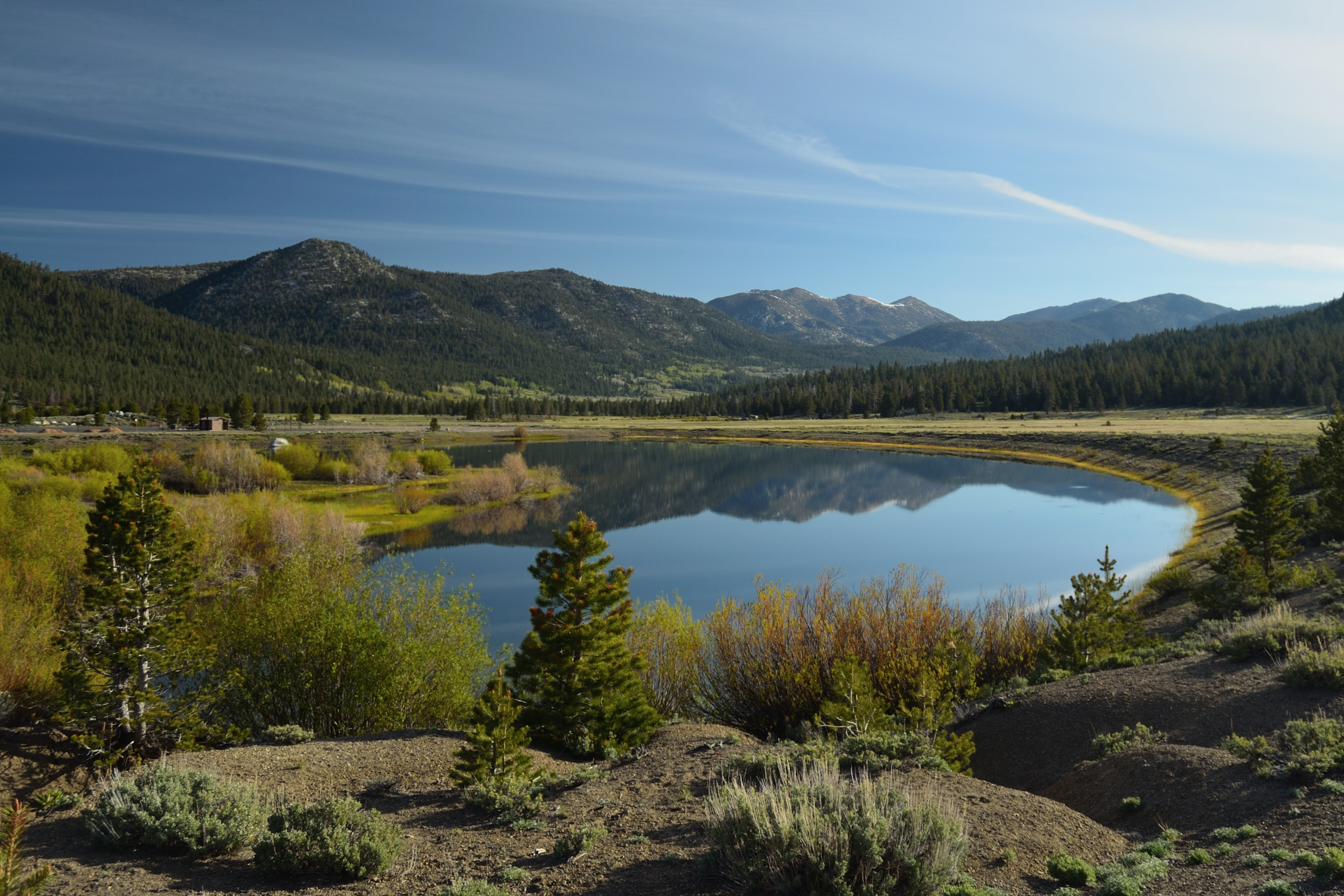
Green meadows and blue skies in the upper reaches of Hope Valley along Blue Lakes Road.

Hope Valley is a broad mountain valley in Alpine County, California, located on the eastern slope of the Sierra Nevada to the northeast of Carson Pass and south of Lake Tahoe. The valley served as a major thoroughfare for the passage of settlers and emigrants to and from California during the Gold Rush era. Sitting at an elevation of just above 7,000 feet (2,100 m) and framed by peaks reaching over 10,000 feet (3,000 m) high, Hope Valley is known for its wide vistas, fly fishing, fall colors, and winter activities.

== Geography ==
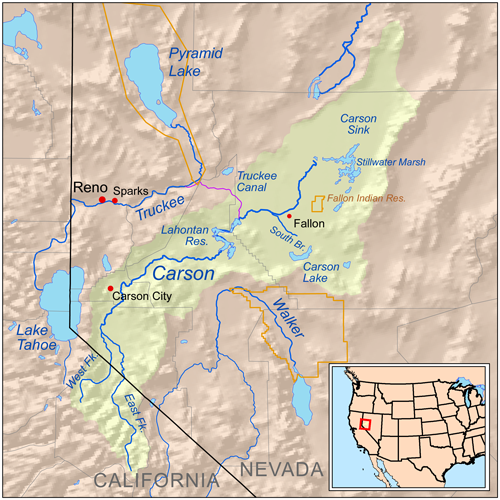
A map of the Carson River basin. Hope Valley is situated along the California portion of its west fork, where the river makes a sharp eastward turn after initially flowing north.

Situated on the eastern slope of the Sierra Nevada mountains, the upper end of the valley begins about four miles (6.4 km) northeast of Carson Pass, near the confluence where Red Lake Creek flows into the West Fork of the Carson River. From this point, the valley carries the river north for several miles before making a wide turn to the east. About a mile and a half east of the turn, just before reaching Sorensen's Resort, the wide valley abruptly narrows, and a steep V-shaped canyon carries the river further downstream toward the Nevada deserts.

The elevation of the valley floor ranges from 7,160 feet (2,180 m) at its upper end to 7,000 feet (2,130 m) at the base of the valley where it narrows into Woodfords Canyon. Ringed by tall mountain peaks on all sides, some of them exceeding 10,000 feet (3,000 m) in height, the valley boasts over 3,000 feet (910 m) of local vertical relief. The tallest of these peaks are Freel Peak (10,881 feet (3,317 m)), Job's Sister (10,823 feet (3,299 m)), and Jobs Peak (10,633 feet (3,241 m)), all three of which are located on the same ridge some distance to the northeast. Six additional named peaks also loom over Hope Valley: Hawkins Peak (10,024 feet (3,055 m)) and Pickett Peak (9,118 feet (2,779 m)) to the southeast, in the corner formed by the river's eastward bend; Red Lake Peak (10,063 feet (3,067 m)) and Stevens Peak (10,059 feet (3,066 m)) to the southwest, guarding the north side of Carson Pass; and Waterhouse Peak (9,497 feet (2,895 m)) and Thompson Peak (9,340 feet (2,850 m)) flanking both sides of Luther Pass to the northwest.

Hope Valley is well connected to the California state highway network. California State Route 88 follows the course of the valley from southwest to northeast, extending further westward over Carson Pass and northeastward down Woodfords Canyon toward the Carson Valley. State Route 89 enters the valley through Luther Pass to the north, and intersects SR 88 at Pickett's Junction. Regular snowplow patrols keep both highways open year round, only closing in the event of particularly heavy snowstorms.

=== Climate ===
Burnside Lake is a SNOTEL weather station situated above Hope Valley, on the southern flank of Hawkins Peak, at an elevation of 9100 feet (2774 m). Burnside Lake has a subalpine climate (Köppen Dfc).

Climate data for Burnside Lake, California, 2004–2020 normals, 1991-2020 precipitation: 8129ft (2478m)
Month	Jan	Feb	Mar	Apr	May	Jun	Jul	Aug	Sep	Oct	Nov	Dec	Year
Record high °F (°C)	66 (19)	63 (17)	66 (19)	68 (20)	74 (23)	78 (26)	83 (28)	80 (27)	82 (28)	72 (22)	67 (19)	61 (16)	83 (28)
Mean maximum °F (°C)	56 (13)	54 (12)	58 (14)	62 (17)	67 (19)	74 (23)	78 (26)	77 (25)	74 (23)	68 (20)	62 (17)	55 (13)	79 (26)
Mean daily maximum °F (°C)	41.1 (5.1)	40.1 (4.5)	43.1 (6.2)	47.4 (8.6)	53.6 (12.0)	63.1 (17.3)	70.8 (21.6)	69.8 (21.0)	64.3 (17.9)	54.3 (12.4)	46.3 (7.9)	39.8 (4.3)	52.8 (11.6)
Daily mean °F (°C)	27.3 (−2.6)	26.6 (−3.0)	30.1 (−1.1)	34.7 (1.5)	41.2 (5.1)	48.8 (9.3)	55.7 (13.2)	54.4 (12.4)	49.1 (9.5)	40.7 (4.8)	33.3 (0.7)	26.8 (−2.9)	39.1 (3.9)
Mean daily minimum °F (°C)	13.6 (−10.2)	13.2 (−10.4)	17.2 (−8.2)	21.9 (−5.6)	28.9 (−1.7)	34.6 (1.4)	40.7 (4.8)	39.0 (3.9)	34.0 (1.1)	27.1 (−2.7)	20.2 (−6.6)	13.8 (−10.1)	25.4 (−3.7)
Mean minimum °F (°C)	−8 (−22)	−9 (−23)	−4 (−20)	3 (−16)	19 (−7)	25 (−4)	32 (0)	30 (−1)	24 (−4)	13 (−11)	−1 (−18)	−9 (−23)	−9 (−23)
Record low °F (°C)	−25 (−32)	−19 (−28)	−13 (−25)	−7 (−22)	11 (−12)	16 (−9)	28 (−2)	28 (−2)	16 (−9)	2 (−17)	−18 (−28)	−21 (−29)	−25 (−32)
Average precipitation inches (mm)	7.89 (200)	6.97 (177)	5.89 (150)	3.16 (80)	2.03 (52)	0.46 (12)	0.68 (17)	0.33 (8.4)	0.92 (23)	2.46 (62)	4.26 (108)	7.32 (186)	42.37 (1,075.4)
Source 1: XMACIS2
Source 2: NOAA (Precipitation)

== History ==
Hope Valley was historically inhabited by the Northern Washoe people, whose traditional homeland centered around Lake Tahoe and extended into the mountains to the south and west, and the desert valleys and ranges to the east. Every winter, a group of Northern Washoes would travel through the valley by snowshoe along a trail they called Pewećeli Yeweš. First they would cross westward to reach the western slope of the Sierra Nevada, where they would harvest salmon from the American River. Then, after smoking the salmon to preserve it for their return journey, they would retrace their steps eastward to bring the salmon to their compatriots overwintering in the desert to the east of Hope Valley.

In the summer of 1848, the soldiers of a Mormon Battalion detachment gave the valley its English name. These Mormons were returning to Utah after completing their service in the Mexican–American War. The soldiers were in poor spirits after three of their men had been killed in an incident about a month before at Tragedy Spring, across Carson Pass to the west. When they saw the valley, "[their] spirits revived when they arrived in sight of it." Thus they christened the newfound valley "Hope Valley". Henry W. Bigler, a soldier in the battalion, wrote that they "campt [sic] at the head of what we called Hope Valley as we began to have hope." Analogously, in 1855, surveyors christened two similar valleys to the south as "Faith Valley" and "Charity Valley", in reference to the three theological virtues of Christianity.

During California's Gold Rush era, Hope Valley served as a crucial transportation conduit across the Sierra Nevada. It carried the initial route of the California Trail through the eastern slopes of the Sierras, as well as the initial route of the Pony Express. It was also part of the route used by the famous Snowshoe Thompson.

In the early 20th century, a proposal was studied to dam the valley in order to form a reservoir. This proposal, however, was never carried out.

== Conservation ==
Hope Valley is part of the Carson Ranger District of Humboldt–Toiyabe National Forest. With the exception of a few scattered inholdings, the entire area of Hope Valley is within this national forest. The valley borders Eldorado National Forest at Carson Pass, and the Lake Tahoe Basin Management Unit, a special unit of the U.S. Forest Service, at Luther Pass.

In 1989, the California Department of Fish and Wildlife designated 2,900 acres (1,200 ha) of valley bottom as Hope Valley Wildlife Area.

== See also ==
- West Fork Carson River
- Eastern Sierra
