= Sunnyslope =

Sunnyslope may refer to:

== Canada ==
- Sunnyslope, Alberta, a hamlet

== United States ==
(by state)

- Sunnyslope Mountain, Phoenix, Arizona
- Sunnyslope, Arizona, a former town in Arizona.
- Sunnyslope, California, in Riverside County
- Sunnyslope, Butte County, California
- Sunnyslope, Idaho
- Sunnyslope (Centreville, Mississippi), listed on the National Register of Historic Places (NRHP) in Amite County, Mississippi
- Sunnyslope (Bronx, New York), NRHP-listed in New York City
- Sunnyslope, Oregon
- Sunnyslope, Washington
