= South Fork, California =

South Fork, California may refer to:

- South Fork, Butte County, California
- South Fork, Madera County, California
- South Fork, Mendocino County, California
- South Fork, Humboldt County, California
