= Sierra Sky Park =

Sierra Sky Park may refer to:

- Sierra Sky Park, California
- Sierra Sky Park Airport
