= Hawkins Peak (California) =

Mountain in the American state of California

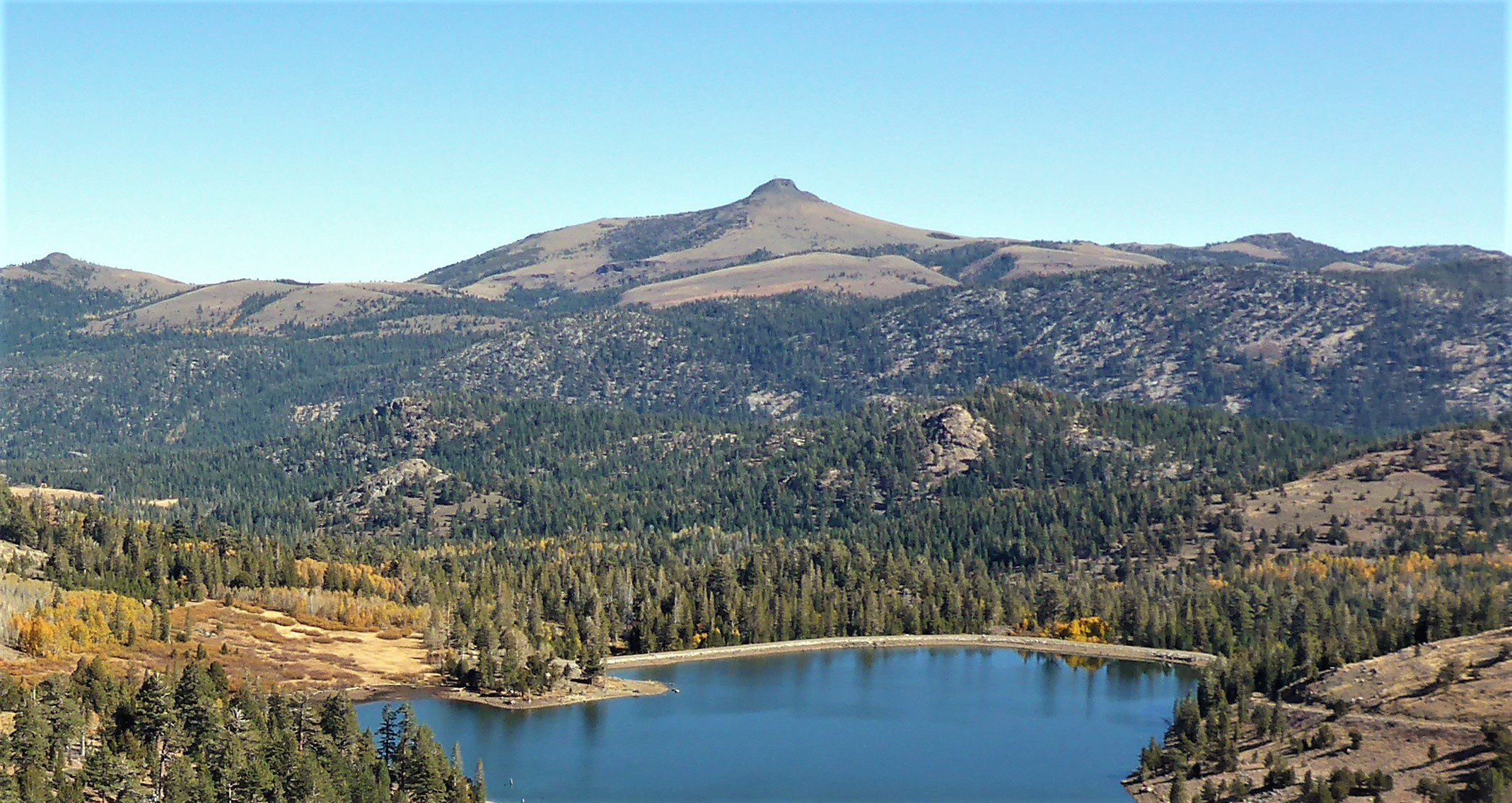
- Southwest aspect, from Carson Pass area

Highest point
- Elevation: 10,024 ft (3,055 m)
- Prominence: 2,144 ft (653 m)
- Parent peak: Stevens Peak (10,059 ft)
- Isolation: 5.91 mi (9.51 km)
- Coordinates: 38°44′19″N 119°52′21″W

Naming
- Etymology: John Hawkins

Geography
- Location within California Location within the United States
- Location: Humboldt–Toiyabe National Forest
- Country: United States of America
- State: California
- County: Alpine
- Parent range: Sierra Nevada
- Topo map: USGS Markleeville

Geology
- Rock age: Miocene
- Mountain type(s): Volcanic plug, volcanic pinnacle
- Rock type: Hornblende-andesite

Climbing
- Easiest route: class 2

Hawkins Peak is a 10,024-foot-elevation (3,055-meter) mountain summit located in Alpine County, California, United States.

== Description ==
This landmark of Hope Valley is set 15 miles (24 km) south of South Lake Tahoe, on land managed by Humboldt–Toiyabe National Forest. Hawkins Peak is situated in the Sierra Nevada mountain range, with precipitation runoff from the peak draining into tributaries of the West Fork Carson River. Topographic relief is significant as the north aspect rises 4,000 feet (1,200 meters) above California State Route 88 at West Carson Canyon in two miles. The nearest higher neighbor is Stevens Peak, 5.6 miles (9.0 km) to the west across Hope Valley.

== History ==
In 1833, Joseph R. Walker's expedition passed through the gap between Hawkins Peak and Markleeville Peak to the south. The United States Geological Survey surveyed this area in 1889 and labelled this geographic feature on their 1893 Markleeville quadrangle map. This landform's toponym has been officially adopted by the U.S. Board on Geographic Names, and has been in Sierra Club publications since at least 1895. The mountain's namesake is John Hawkins, the first white settler in Hot Springs Valley and squatter on a cattle ranch east of the peak, circa 1850s.

== Climate ==
According to the Köppen climate classification system, Hawkins Peak is located in an alpine climate zone. Most weather fronts originate in the Pacific Ocean and travel east toward the Sierra Nevada mountains. As fronts approach, they are forced upward by the peaks (orographic lift), causing them to drop their moisture in the form of rain or snowfall onto the range.

== Geology ==
Hawkins Peak is one of several volcanic peaks that surround Markleeville. It is a possible flank vent of the Round Top (Alpine County, California) volcano.

== Gallery ==
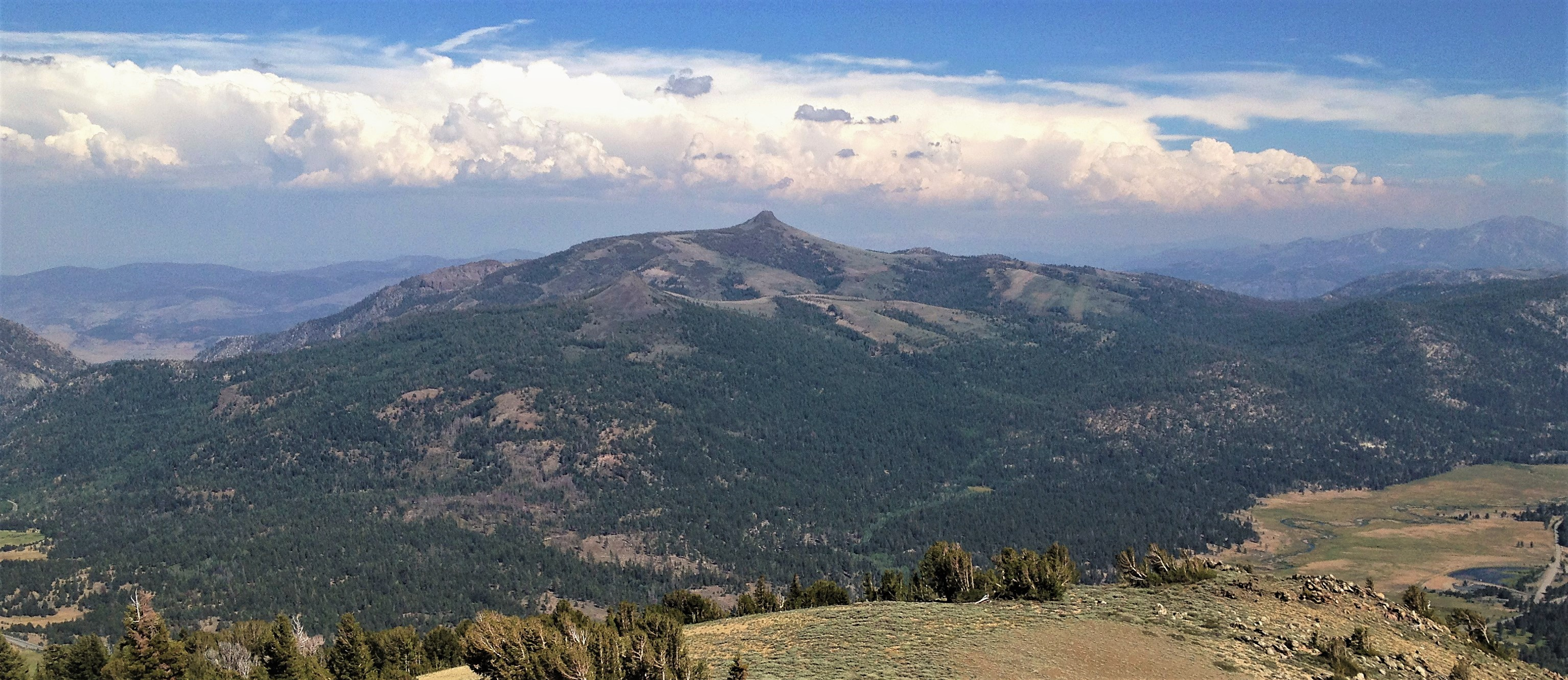
Northwest aspect of Hawkins Peak seen from Waterhouse Peak.

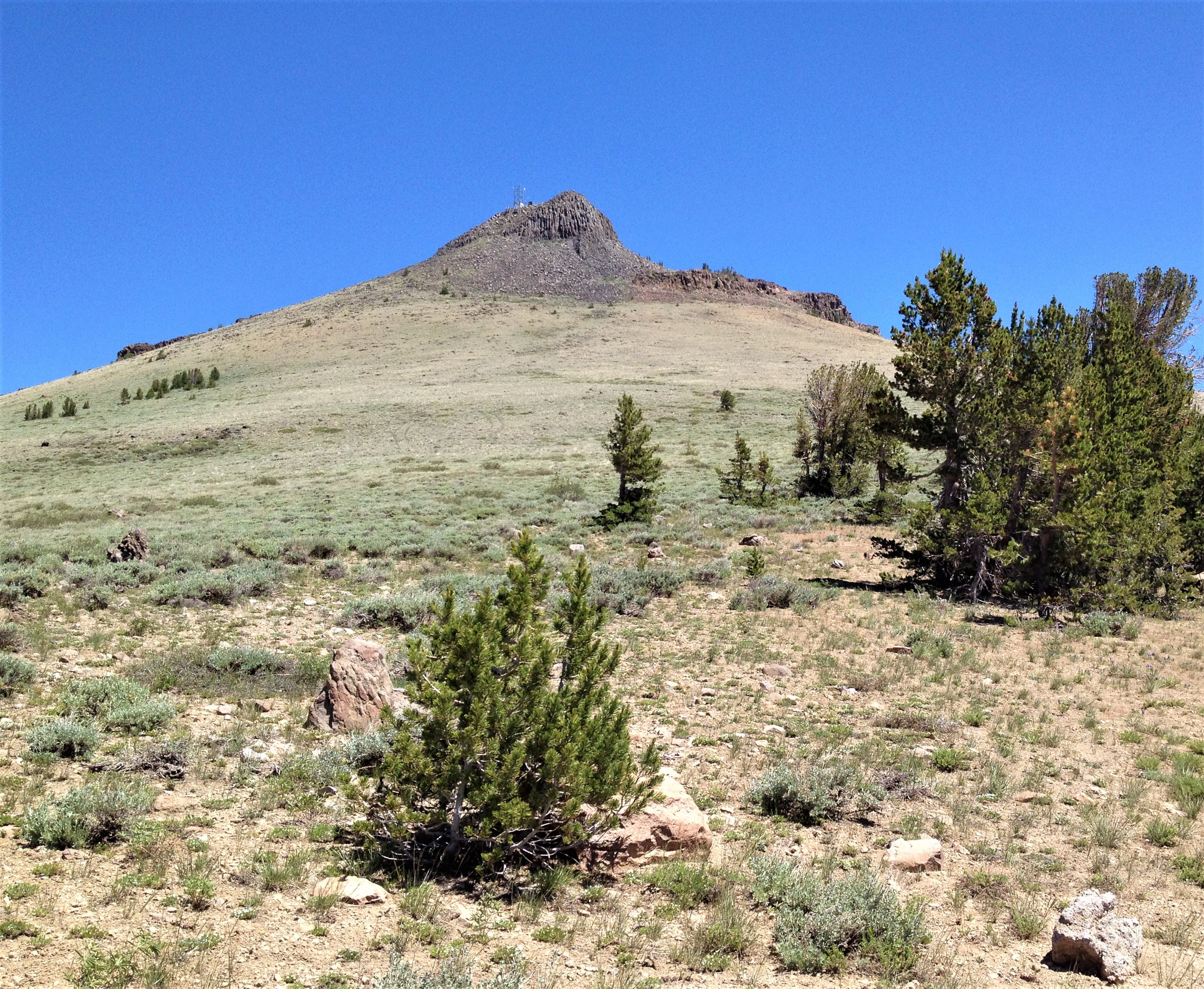
Approaching Hawkins Peak from the south.

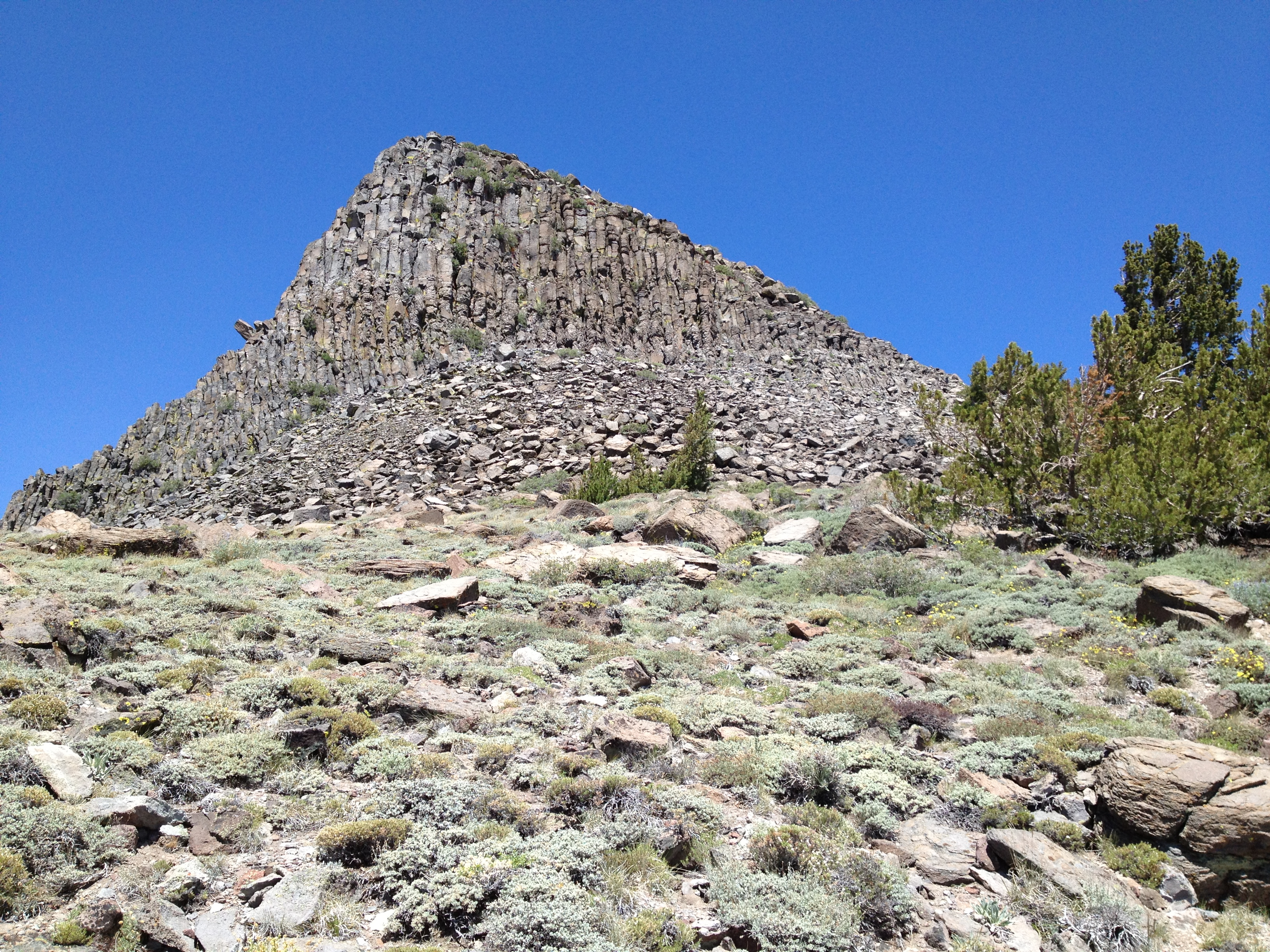
Summit (andestite)

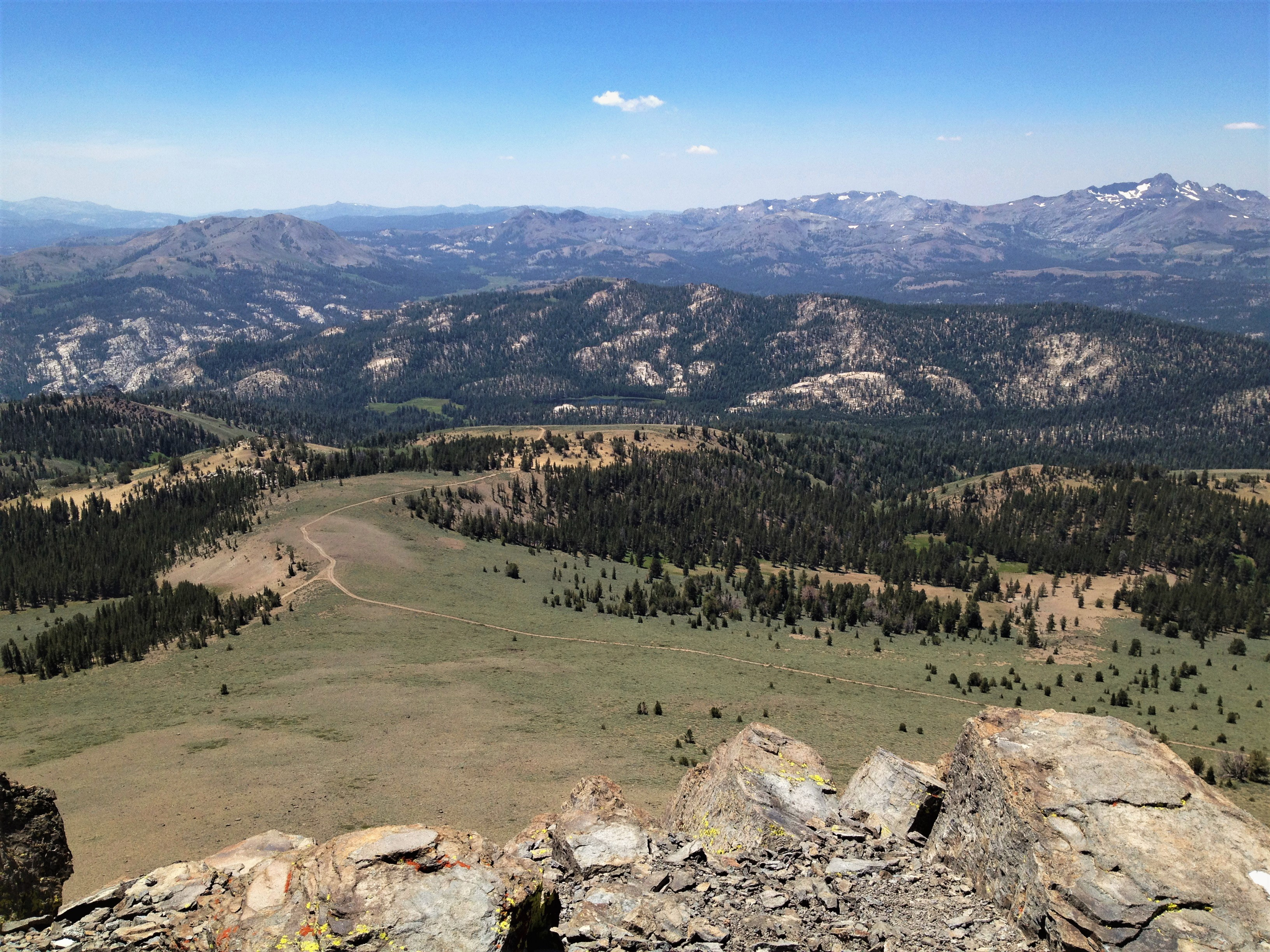
From summit, view southwest of the Calpine Road approach.
Round Top in upper right corner.

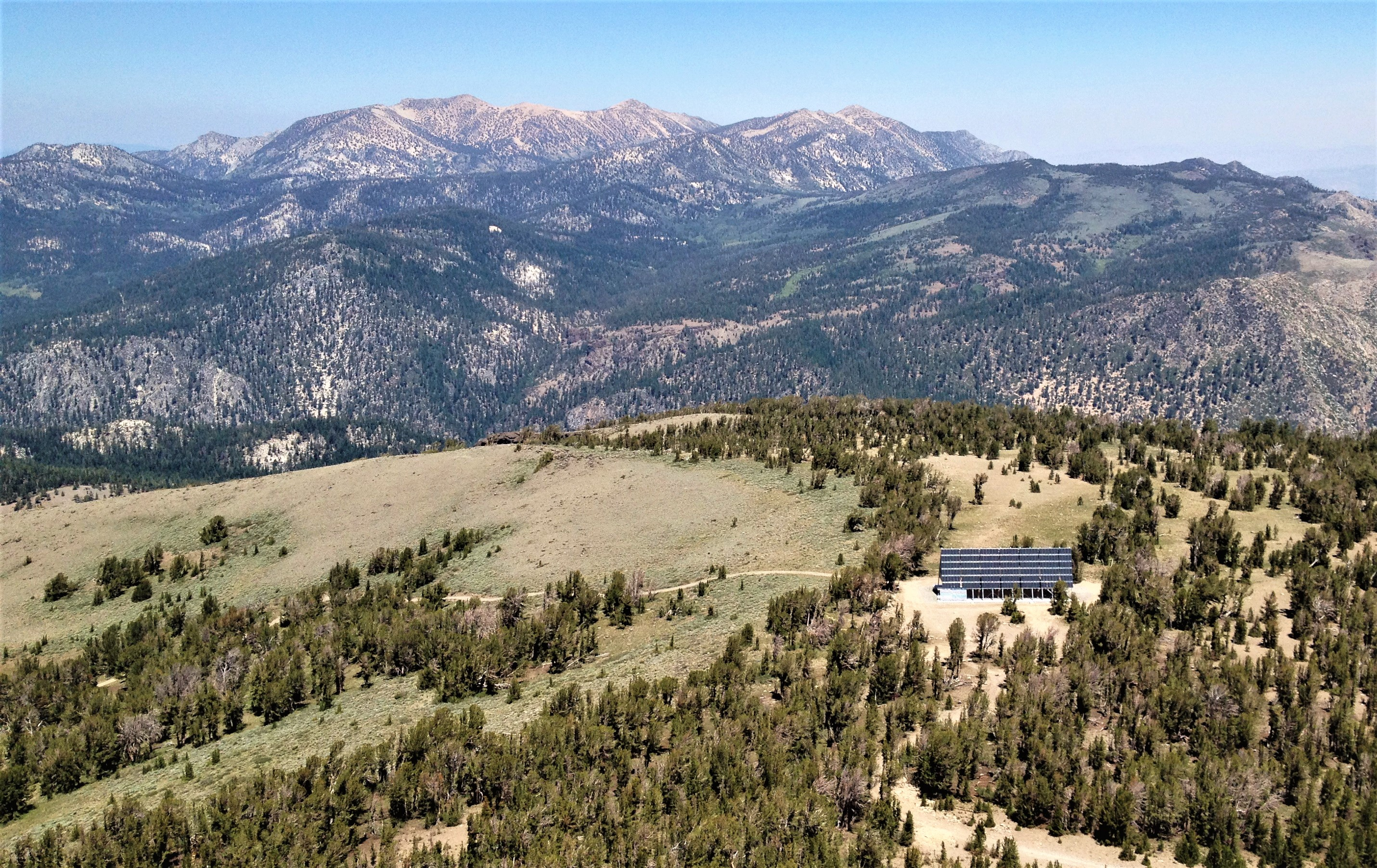
Summit view looking north to Freel, Jobs Sister, and Jobs peaks.

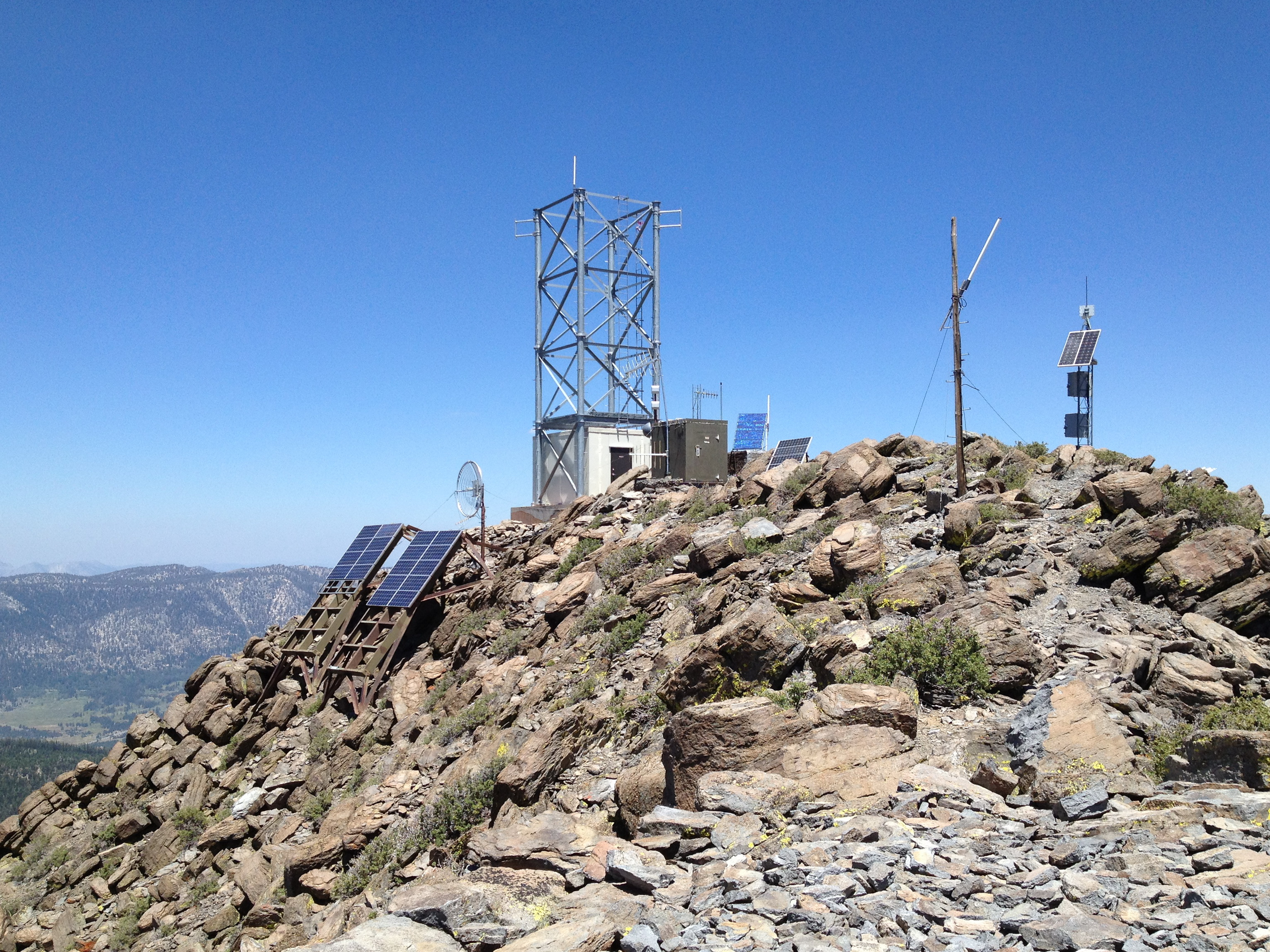
The summit

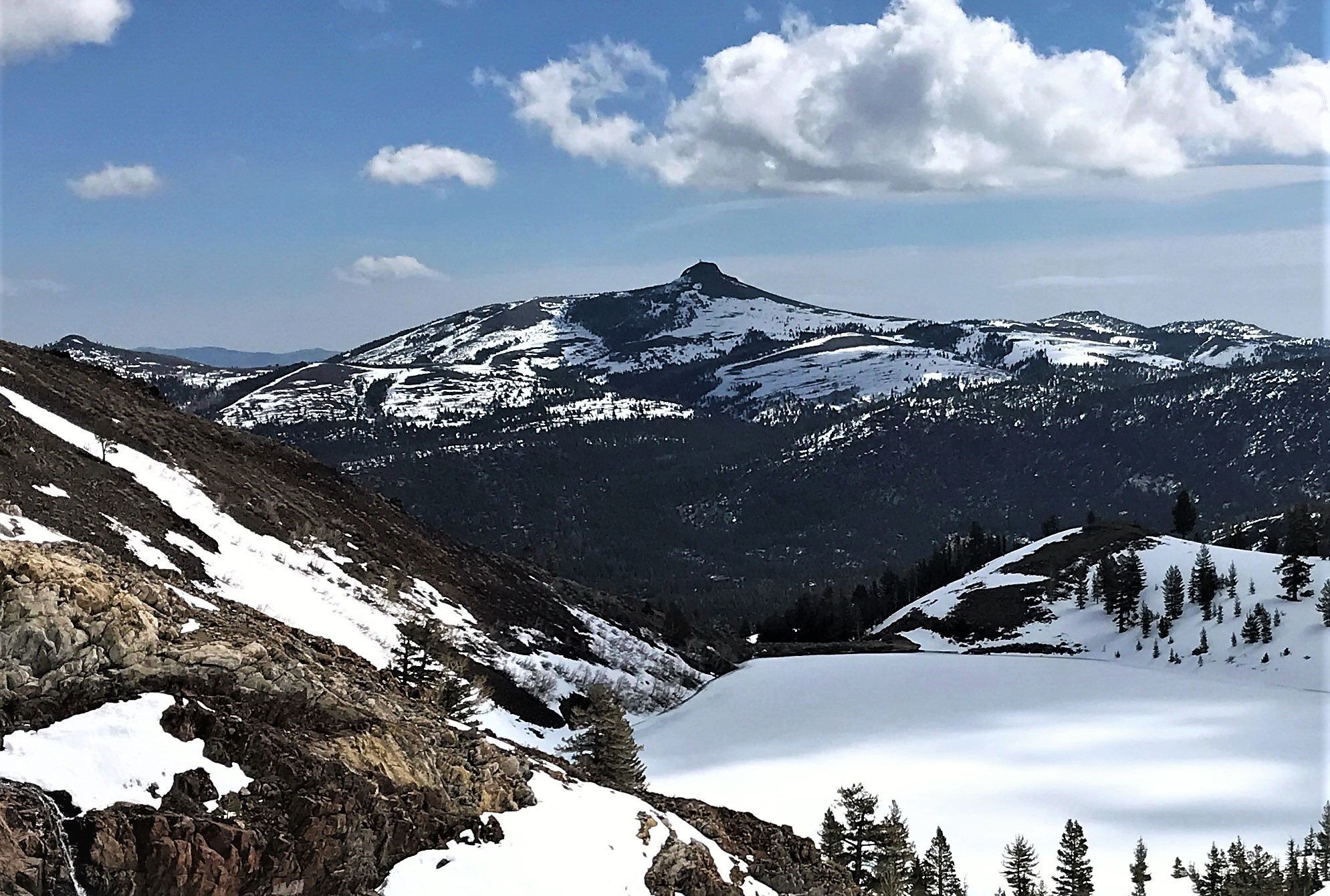
West aspect

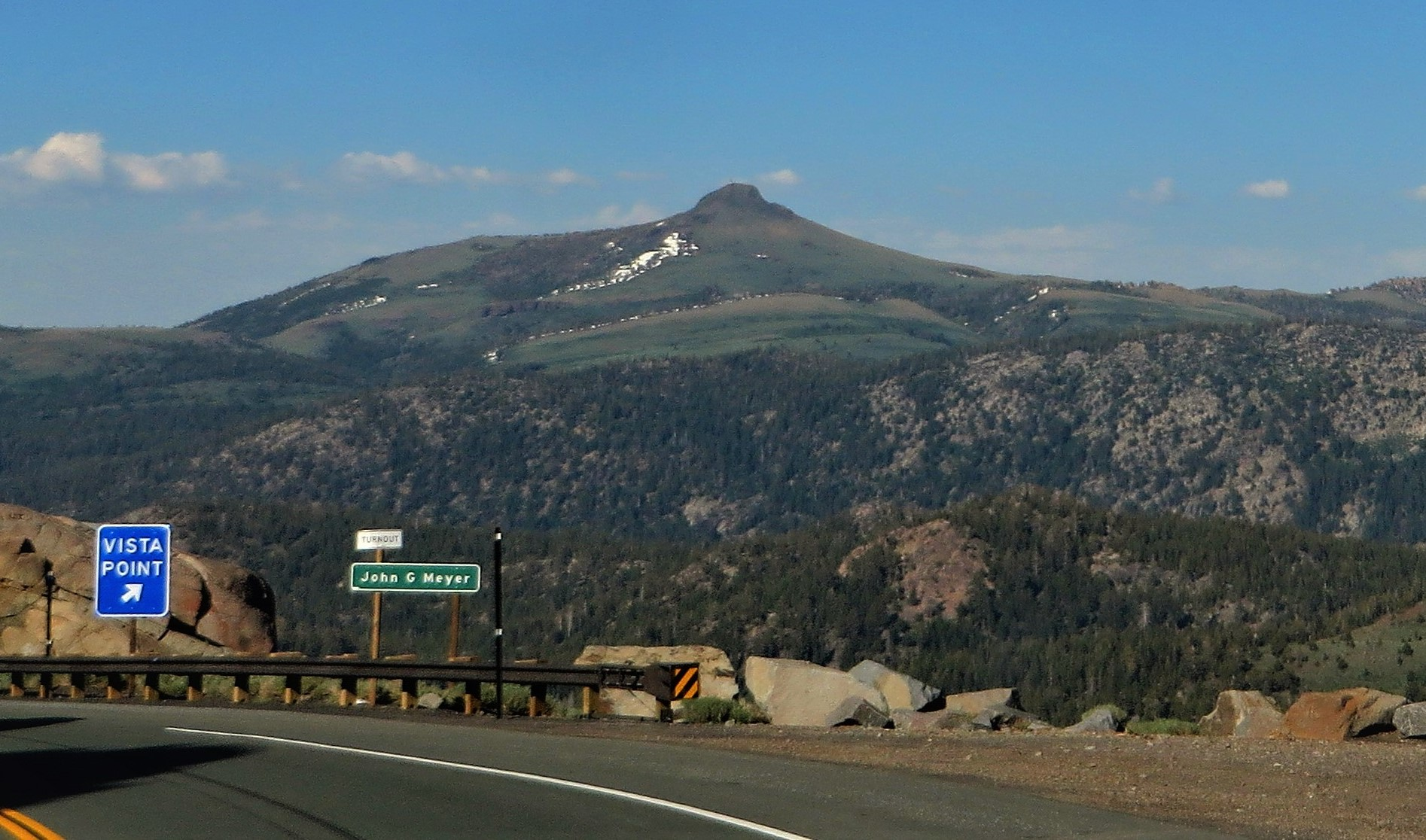
Hawkins Peak seen from Red Lake Vista Point along California State Route 88 at Carson Pass

== See also ==
- Carson Pass
