= Hawkins Peak =

Hawkins Peak can refer to:

- Hawkins Peak (California), a 10,024-foot (3,055 m) peak at 38°44′19″N 119°52′21″W in California
- Hawkins Peak (Antarctica), a peak at 75°24′S 110°29′W in Antarctica.
