= Sebastopol, Nevada County, California =

Unincorporated community in California, United States

Sebastopol, California
- Unincorporated community
- Location in California Sebastopol, California (the United States)
- Coordinates: 39°21′46″N 121°07′16″W
- Country: United States
- State: California
- County: Nevada
- Elevation: 1,913 ft (583 m)

Sebastopol was a historic mining community located on the San Juan Ridge, about 13 miles north of Nevada City. It lay midway between Sweetland and North San Juan, around the intersection of modern Sweetland and School Roads, at an elevation of about 2000 feet.

== Early history ==
Sebastopol was named in 1854, after the city of Sebastopol which was then under a famous siege during the Crimean War. At that time, it consisted of three houses. If it had a prior name, it does not appear in the historic record. Located as it was between two major towns, Sweetland 1 mile to the south, and North San Juan 1 mile to the north, it never had many commercial establishments. Instead as one historian puts it, It was "composed entirely of the residences of the owners of the American and Gold Bluff mines, on Junction Bluff and Manzanita Hills." One observer described it as: "A pleasant little valley is that in which the hamlet of Sebastopol lies—pleasant because of the cultivated green of its circumscribed landscape, and the few white cottages that make up the unpretending village. The most attractive object the traveler sees at Sebastopol is the large garden and orchard of Andrew Hartman...."

It did have, at least for a while, a store, a saloon, a butcher, a sawmill, a boarding house and a hotel. The fact that many of these establishments were sold at constable's sales to pay off debt suggests that commercial establishments in Sebastopol had trouble competing with the larger neighboring towns. The 1880 census counted 165 residents. Yet that same year, one historian dismissed it as "a little residence town ... [for] miners working on Manzanita Hill. There was formerly a store here, but now there are but a few dwelling houses and a boarding house."

One thing Sebastopol did have was its own school district and a first rate school. The school district was established in 1872, its 44 students having previously gone to school in North San Juan. A schoolhouse was erected by "the liberality and public spirit of the residents ... not to be surpassed by any district in the county. They have erected a building that would do credit to a town of four times the population, at a cost of $2,300. They have furnished a bell for the same at a cost of $250, besides other incidentals, including labor in arranging the grounds, planting trees etc., all by taxation and voluntary contributions. The building is a model of its kind: substantially built, nicely finished and well furnished."

Sebastopol had a church, the Miners' Church, as early as 1857. It was served by all the major express lines including Langton's Pioneer Express, which ran to Downieville, Marysville, Nevada City and Virginia City, as well as towns in between, and Dornin's, later Menner's, stage line with frequent service between North San Juan and French Corral.

== Mining ==
Sebastopol was located in a very rich mining district, termed by one newspaper as the "celebrated Sebastopol diggings." One of the early mining pioneers, who may have coined the name Sweetland, was Lemuel C. McKeeby, who arrived in 1853. His memoirs provide an interesting account of mining in Sebastopol before the arrival of the major water ditches which led to large scale hydraulic mining. His claim, first called McKeeby's Diggings, became the Gold Bluff Company, one of the principal mines in the area.

The leading mine, belonging to the American Mining Company, opened in 1852. It was located just west of Sebastopol, overlooking the Middle Yuba River. Described as a "celebrated hydraulic claim," it was one of the first mines to turn increasingly to hydraulic mining as ditches brought adequate water. The first major ditch, the Miner's Ditch, arrived in 1856. In 1870, the American Mining Company was a principal in the construction of the Eureka Ditch, bringing water from high up the Middle Yuba to Sebastopol. This ditch substantially increased the water supply and lowered its cost. Through 1871, the American Mine had washed 6,000,000 yd.³ of gravel which yielded $1,000,000 in gold.

Even as mining was flourishing, one newspaper observed that the people of Sebastopol have "ceased to place their reliance solely upon the productions of the mines, as evinced by the many beautiful cottages and cultivated fields." Orchards were prominent.

== Decline ==
After Judge Sawyer enjoined the discharge of hydraulic debris into the Yuba River or its tributaries, hydraulic mining quickly dried up. There were efforts to explore quartz mining and periodic reports of the discovery of promising quartz ledges, but the town never regained its former prosperity. People began to leave, often selling at distress prices. A Mr. Schmidt sold his house, barn and property in Sebastopol "for the enormous sum of $22.00. Sawyer's decision in the debris case made town property very cheap hearabouts." One indication of the decline in population is that the school, which had 39 students in 1884, had only 24 in 1888.

In 1894, the Union reported on "the old and dilapidated town of Sebastopol. Today Sebastopol is 'dead,' and by glancing upon some of the broken and moss-covered roofs it reminds one of the good old days when hydraulic mining was in full blast and the roar of the monitor sent sweet music throughout the Ridge towns." Two years later, the Union was even less kind: "The traveler would hardly believe that in the days of hydraulic mining this was a thriving little place and many of the houses which were then occupied are now dilapidated. Even the old church, which is still a house of worship, looks careworn and in places the roof is mosscovered."

== Today ==
Today, there are a number of rural residences and ranches where Sebastopol once thrived. No readily visible signs of the town remain.
