= Shady Glen, California =

Unincorporated community in California, United States

Shady Glen
- Unincorporated community
- Location in California Shady Glen (the United States)
- Coordinates: 39°07′05″N 120°56′59″W
- Country: United States
- State: California
- County: Placer County
- Elevation: 2,451 ft (747 m)

Shady Glen is an unincorporated community in Placer County, California. Shady Glen is located 1.25 miles (2.0 km) north of Colfax. It lies at an elevation of 2451 feet (747 m).
