= Shinn, Fremont, California =

Coordinates: 37°34′00″N 121°59′00″W

Shinn (formerly, Shinn Station) was a former unincorporated community around the Western Pacific Railroad station, constructed 1909 on the south bank of Alameda Creek at the end of Shinn Street. It was named after James Shinn, a native of Ohio who settled there in 1856. Later, Western Pacific upgraded the station to be its Niles station (Niles is across the creek on its north bank). In 1956, it became Western Pacific's Fremont Station, when it was incorporated into the city of Fremont in Alameda County, California. It is at an elevation of 69 feet (21 m) and lies on the southern Hayward Fault.

The Shinn area is bounded approximately by Peralta Blvd to the south and Niles to the north and forms the northern part of the Parkmont district of Fremont. In the Shinn area is the Shinn Pond and the Shinn Historic Park and Arboretum, where the Shinn house still stands. The Shinn family ran a nursery, importing trees from throughout the Pacific Rim in the 1850s. This large Victorian Shinn house still reflects the family's humble Quaker origins and ambitious pursuits. The home's interior has high ceilings and is adorned with Victorian-era fixtures. But from the original brown wallpaper in the dining room to the shelves of books in the study, it is hardly ostentatious. Their lawn was essentially an advertisement for the nursery business. Today the arboretum includes several trees that range in age from 130 to 150 years old, including a Moreton Bay fig from Australia, a Belota from Chile and a ginkgo from China.
