= Santa Rita, Santa Barbara County, California =

Former settlement

Coordinates: 34°39′36″N 120°23′51″W

Santa Rita is a former settlement in Santa Barbara County, California, United States. It was located in the Santa Rita Valley, 7.5 miles (12 km) east of Lompoc.

Santa Rita was named for its location on the former Santa Rita land grant, dated April 10, 1839. The land grant was named for Santa Rita de Cassis, an Augustinian whose feast day is May 22.

The Santa Rita post office operated from 1909 to 1914.
