= Stevens Peak (California) =

Mountain in the American state of California

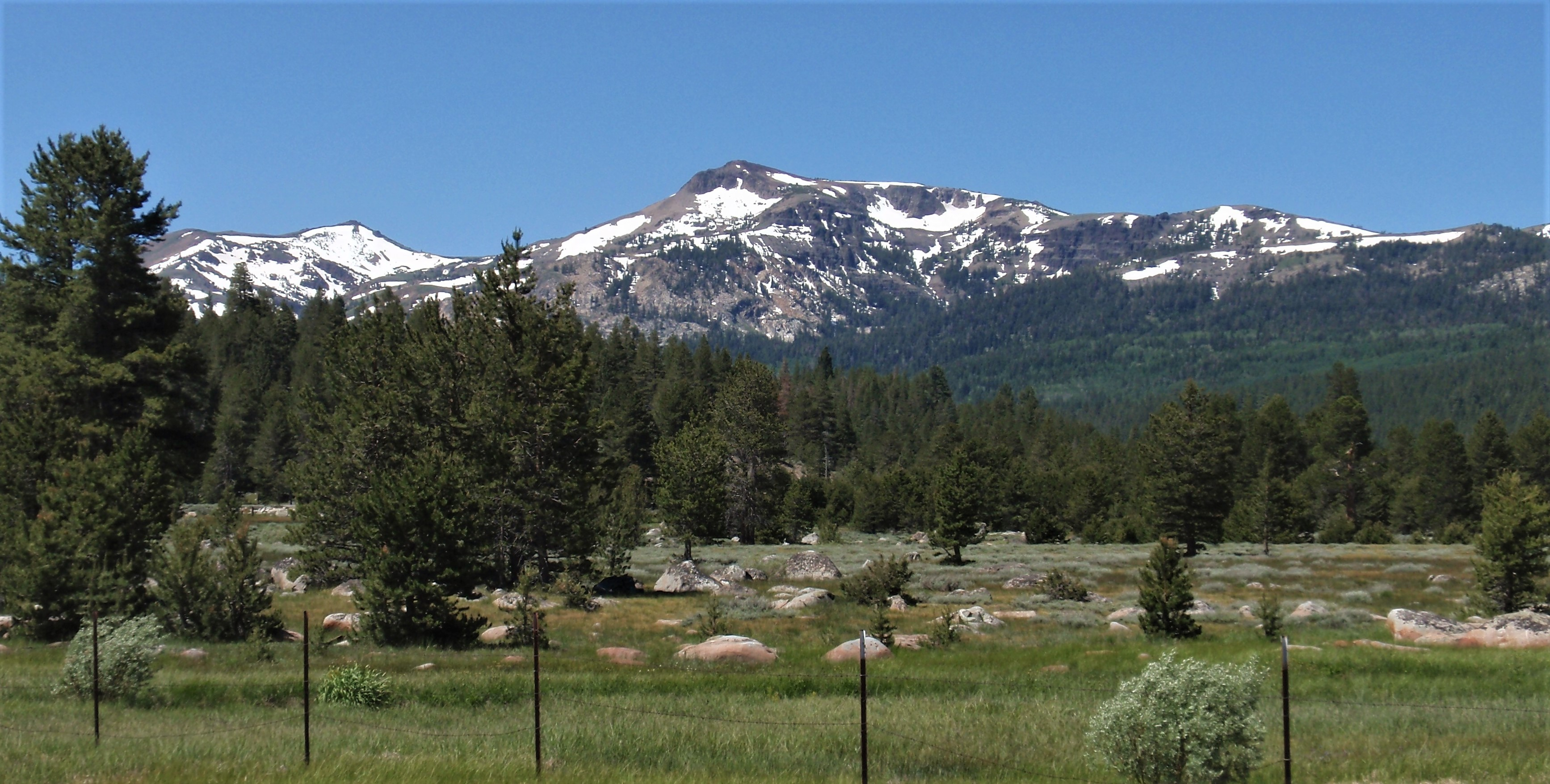
- Northeast aspect

Highest point
- Elevation: 10,051 ft (3,064 m)
- Prominence: 499 ft (152 m)
- Parent peak: Red Lake Peak (10,072 ft)
- Isolation: 1.34 mi (2.16 km)
- Coordinates: 38°44′01″N 119°58′58″W

Naming
- Etymology: J. M. Stevens

Geography
- Location within California Location within the United States
- Location: Alpine County, California, U.S.
- Parent range: Sierra Nevada
- Topo map: USGS Carson Pass

Climbing
- Easiest route: class 2

Stevens Peak is a 10,059-foot-elevation (3,066-meter) mountain summit located in Alpine County, California, United States.

== Description ==
This landmark of Hope Valley is set 13 miles (21 km) south of South Lake Tahoe, on land managed by Humboldt–Toiyabe National Forest. Stevens Peak is situated in the Sierra Nevada mountain range, with precipitation runoff from the peak's east slope draining to the West Fork Carson River, whereas the west slope drains into the Upper Truckee River. The summit is situated 1.5 miles (2.4 km) north of line parent Red Lake Peak, and three miles (4.8 km) north of Carson Pass. Topographic relief is significant as the east aspect rises 2,700 feet (820 meters) above California State Route 88 in 1.5 mile.

== History ==
John C. Frémont was the first European-American to see Lake Tahoe, during his second exploratory expedition. He and Charles Preuss saw the lake from the summit of what was likely Stevens Peak (or possibly Red Lake Peak) on February 14, 1844.

This landform's toponym has been officially adopted by the U.S. Board on Geographic Names, and has been in use since at least 1896 when published by the Sierra Club. The name honors Alpine County supervisor J. M. Stevens who operated a stage station in Hope Valley from 1864 through 1866. The USGS surveyed this area in 1889 and labelled the geographic feature on their map.

== Climate ==
According to the Köppen climate classification system, Stevens Peak is located in an alpine climate zone. Most weather fronts originate in the Pacific Ocean and travel east toward the Sierra Nevada mountains. As fronts approach, they are forced upward by the peaks (orographic lift), causing them to drop their moisture in the form of rain or snowfall onto the range.

== Gallery ==
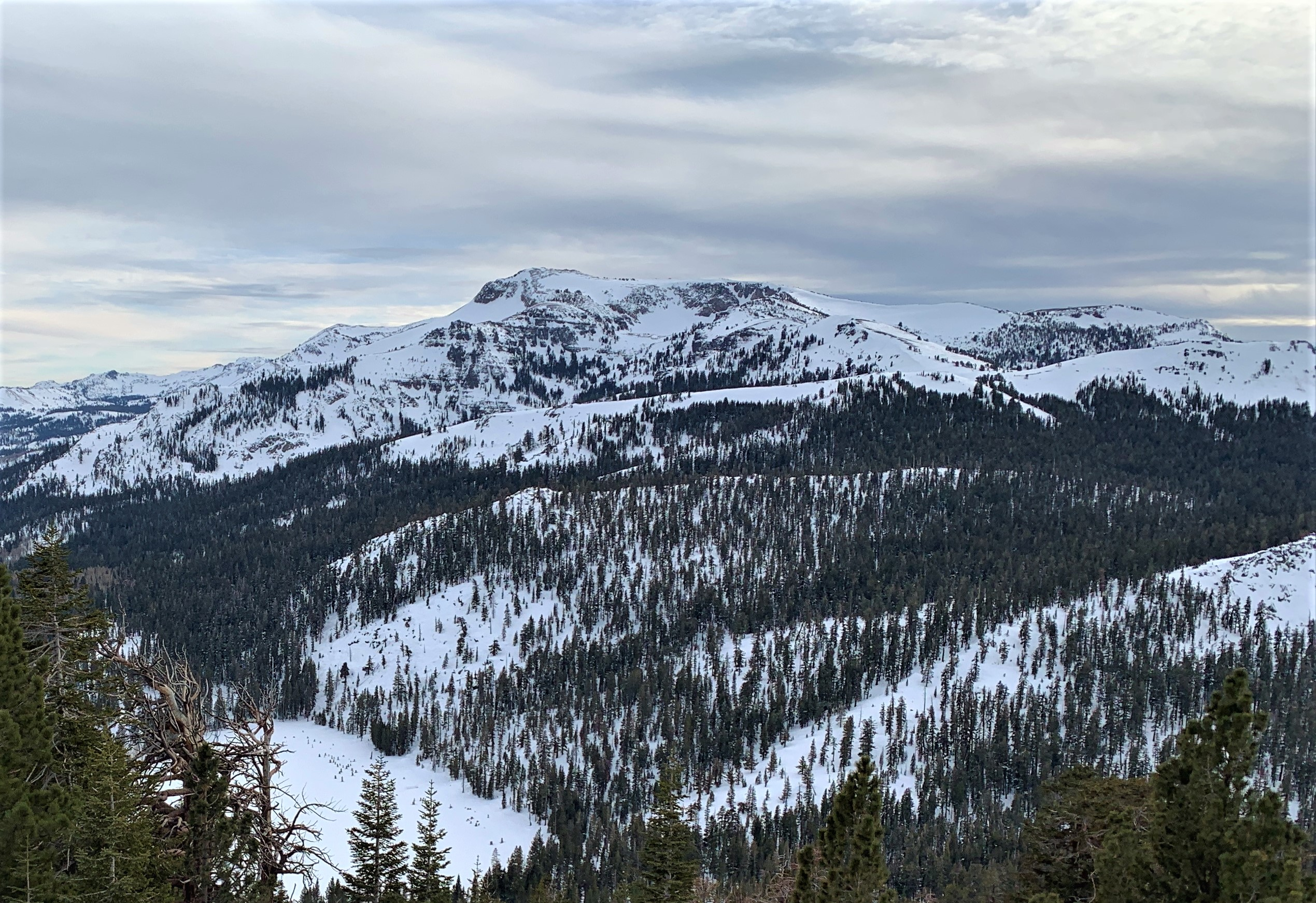
North aspect in winter, from Waterhouse Peak

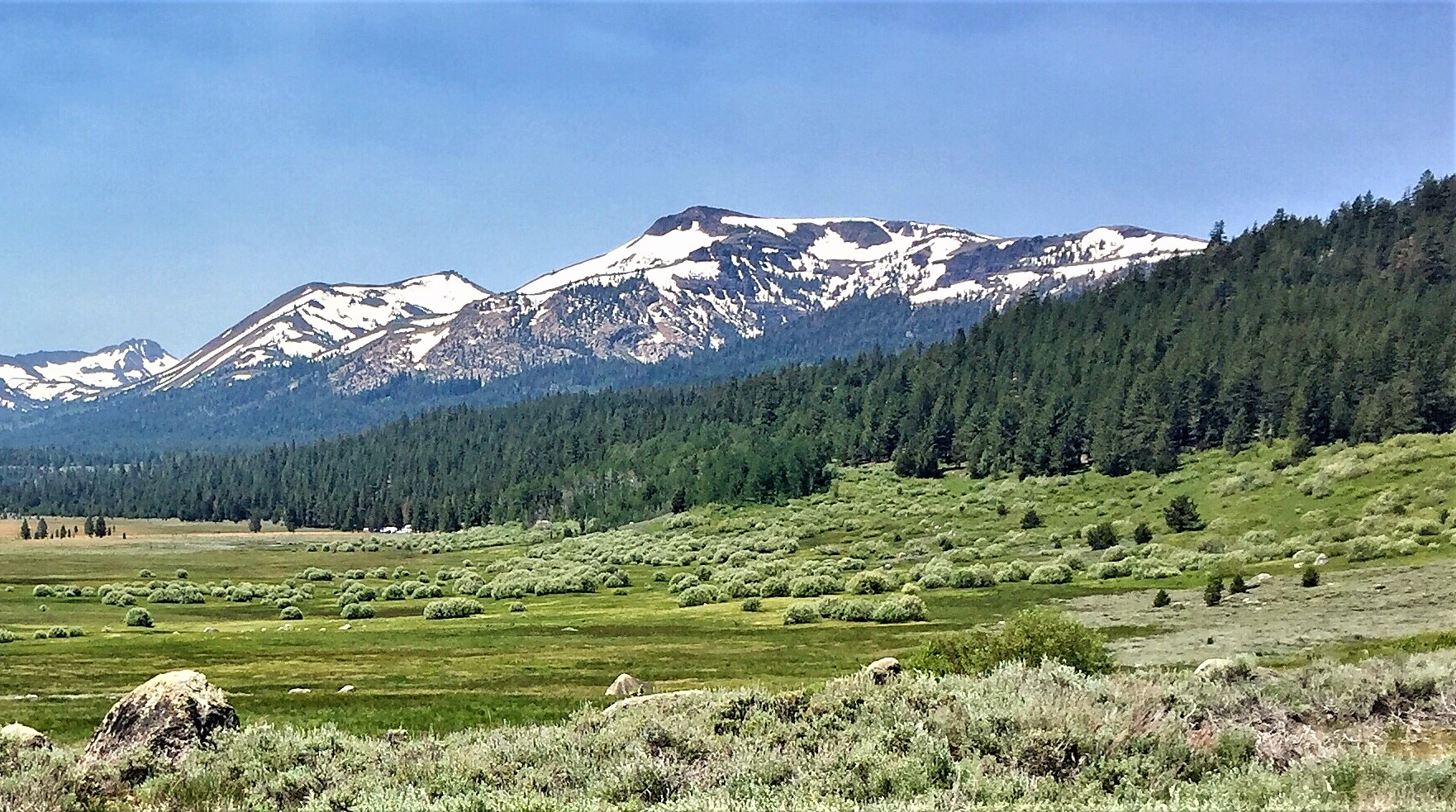
Northeast aspect of Stevens Peak from Hope Valley

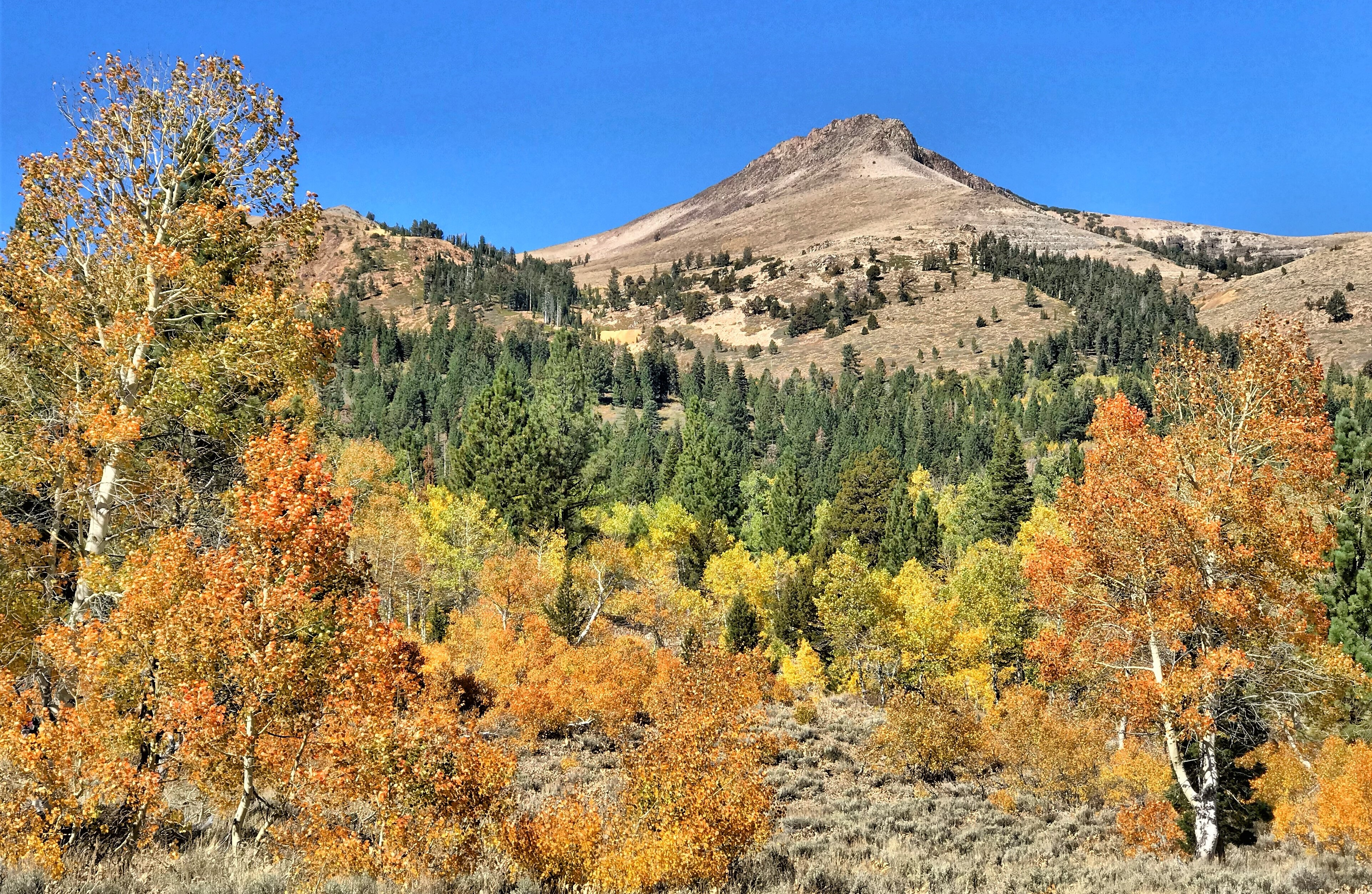
Southeast aspect

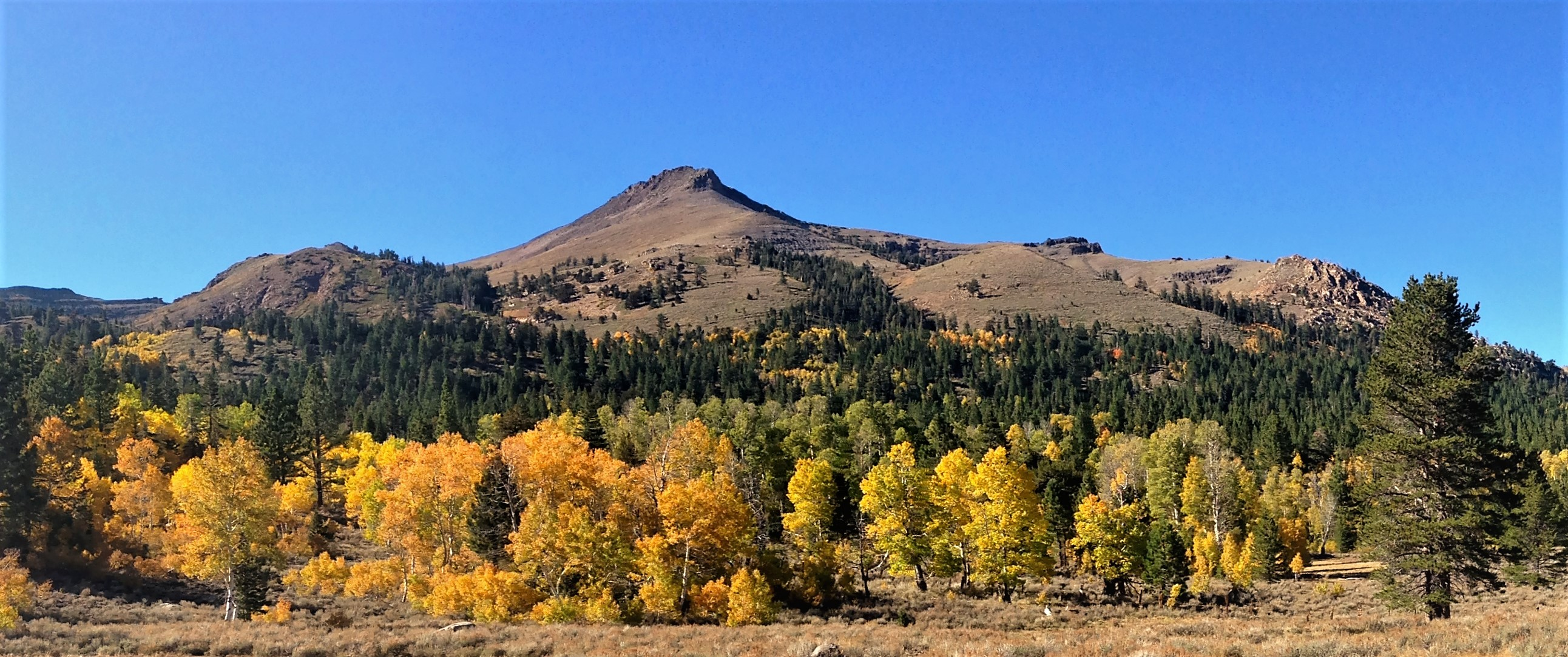
East aspect of Stevens Peak in Hope Valley

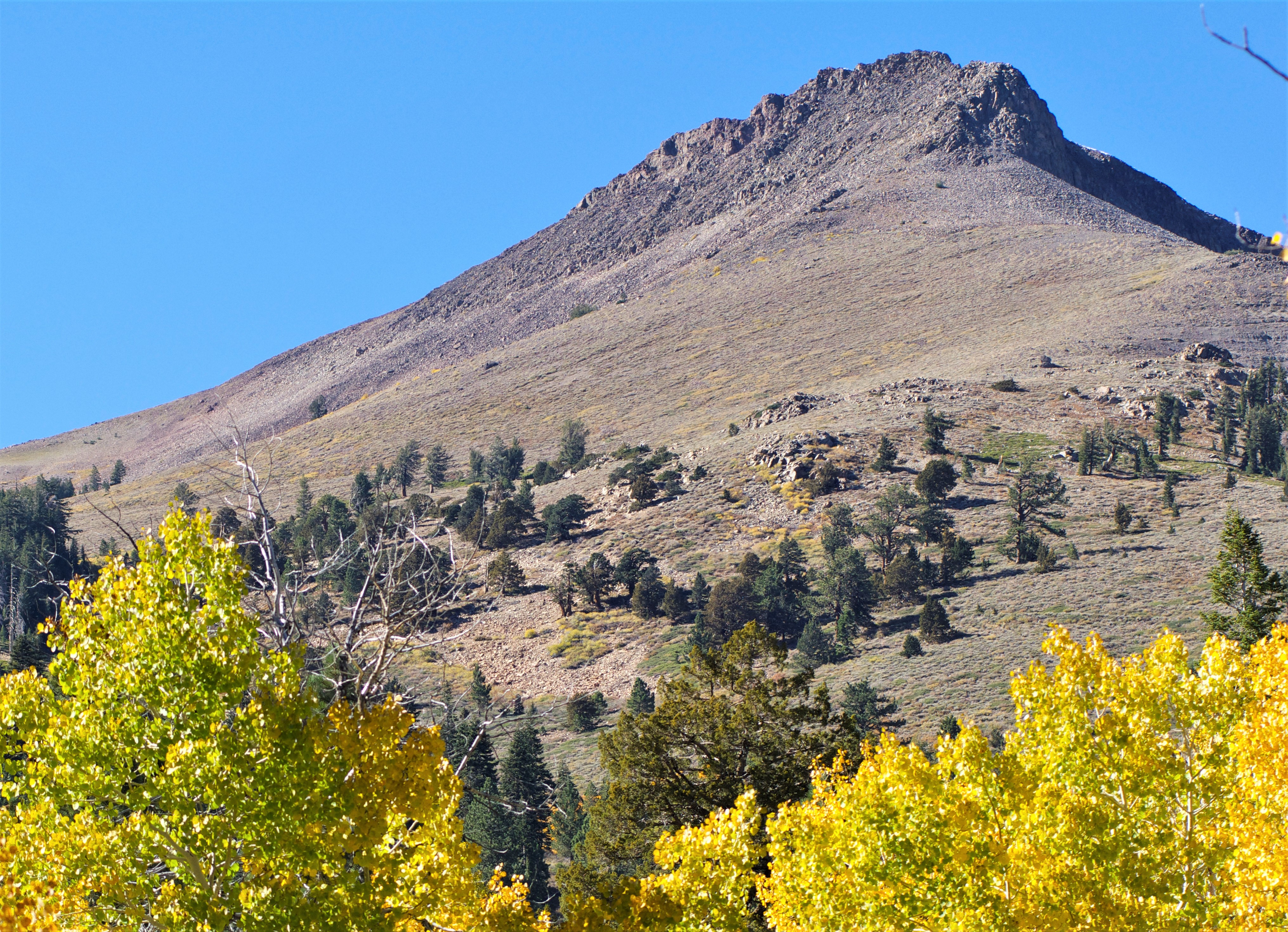
Southeast aspect

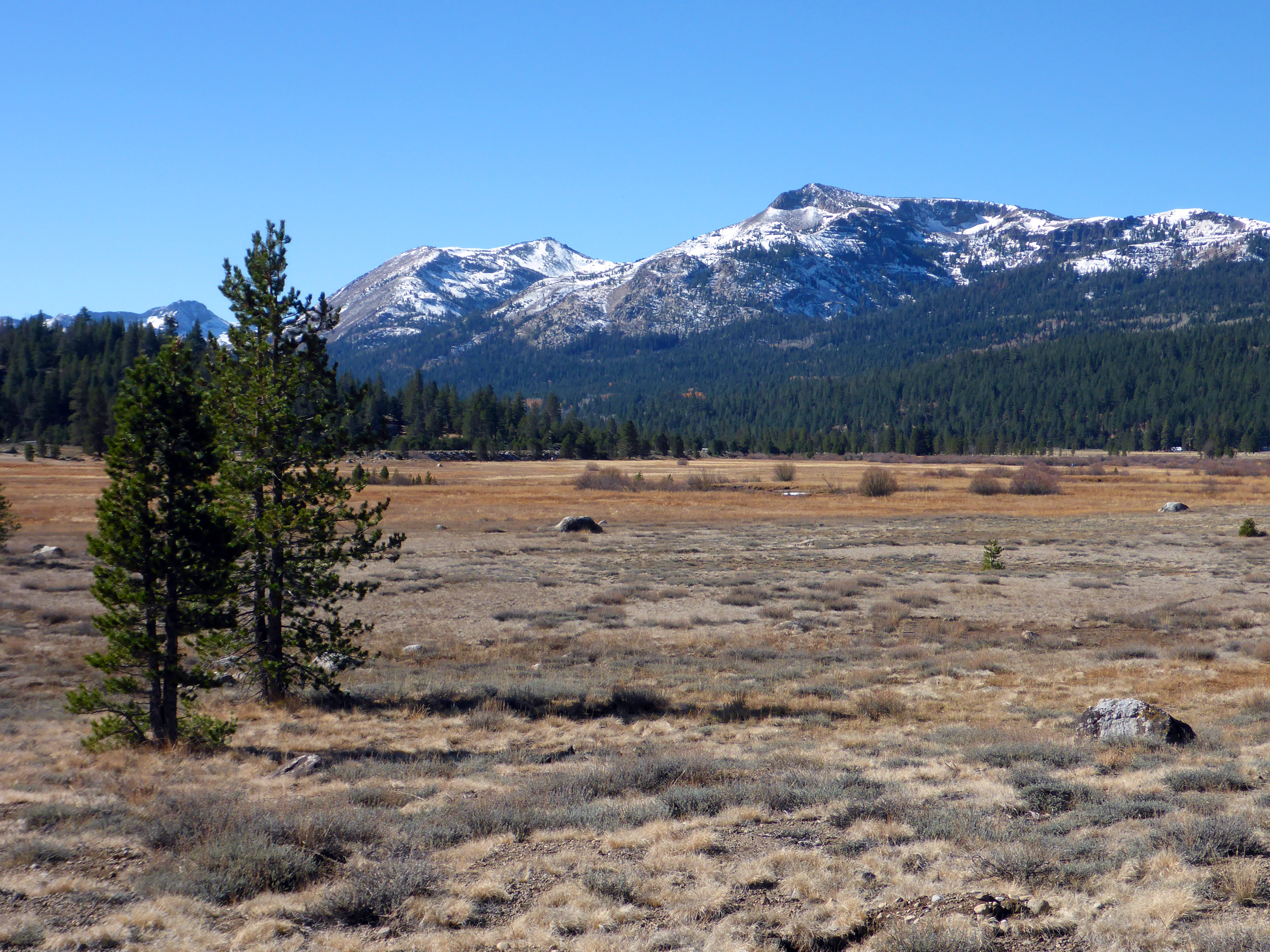
Northeast aspect of Stevens Peak (right of center) from Hope Valley

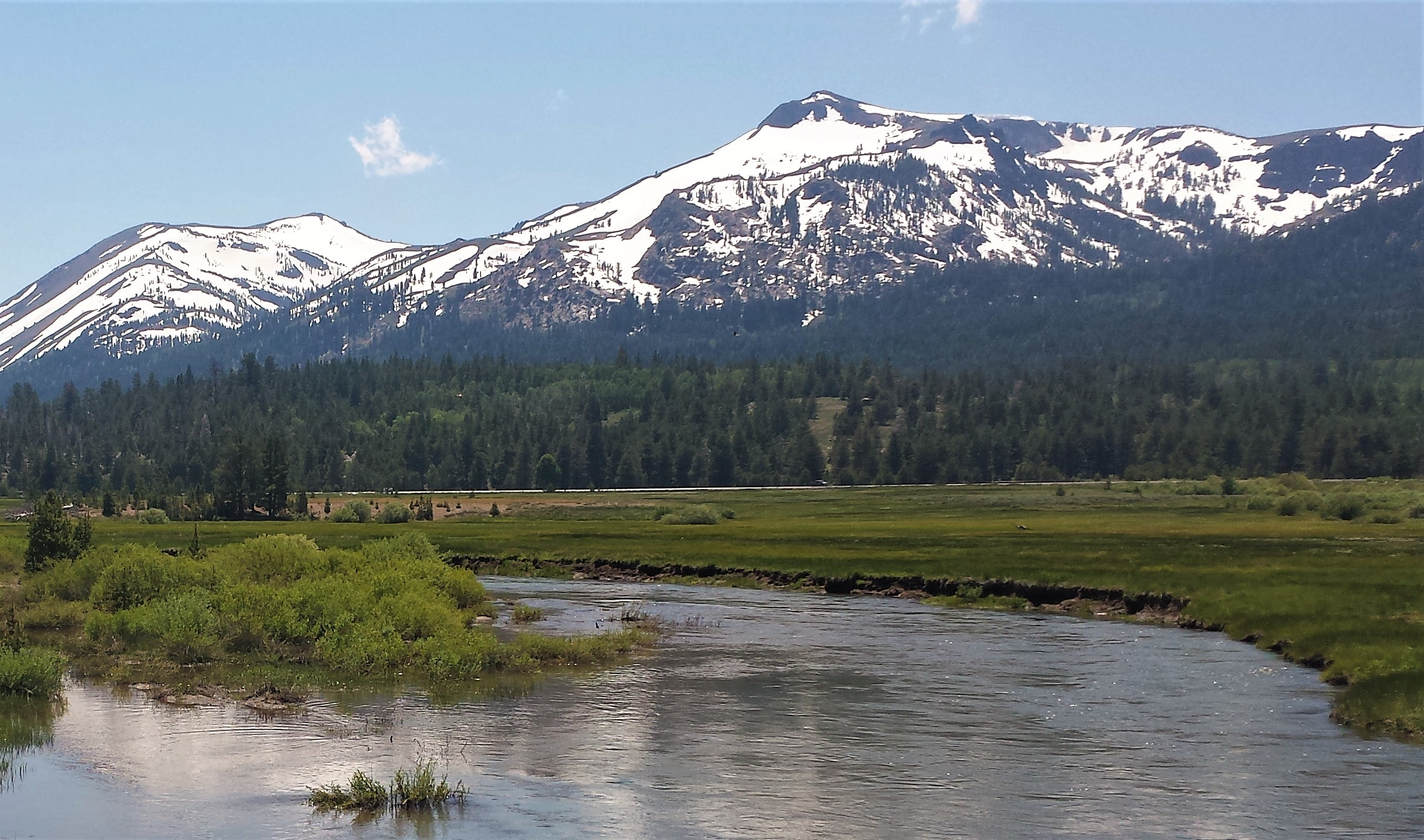
Northeast aspect of Stevens Peak (right) from Hope Valley. Red Lake Peak to left.

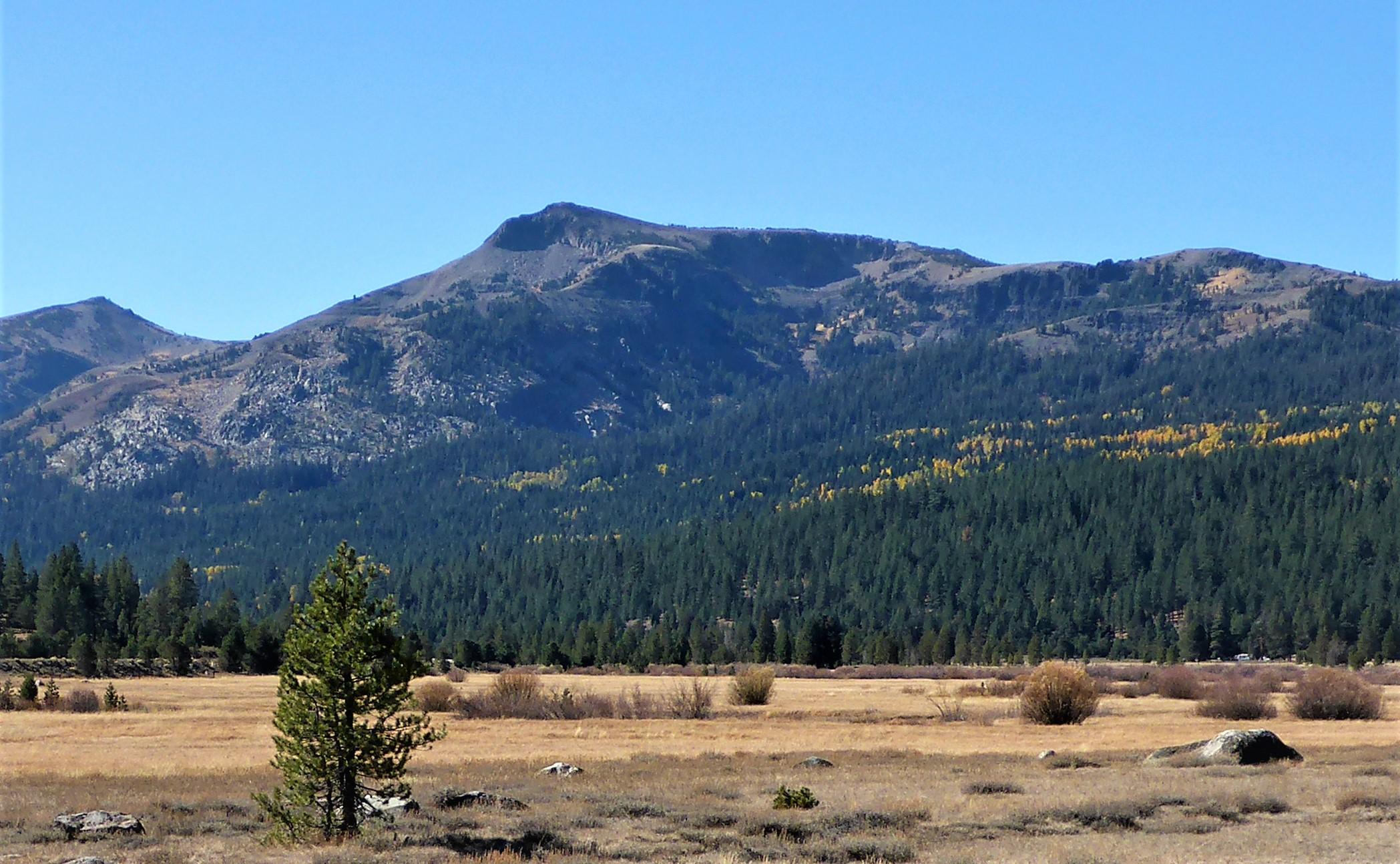
Northeast aspect of Stevens Peak from Hope Valley

== See also ==
- Elephants Back

== Notes ==
- Lidar measurements show the summit elevation to be 10,051 feet and prominence as 549 feet.
- Stevens Peak blocks some of the view of Lake Tahoe from Red Lake Peak. (Google Earth)
