= Sorensen's Resort =

Mountain resort in Alpine County, California, United States

Coordinates: 38°46′28″N 119°54′11″W

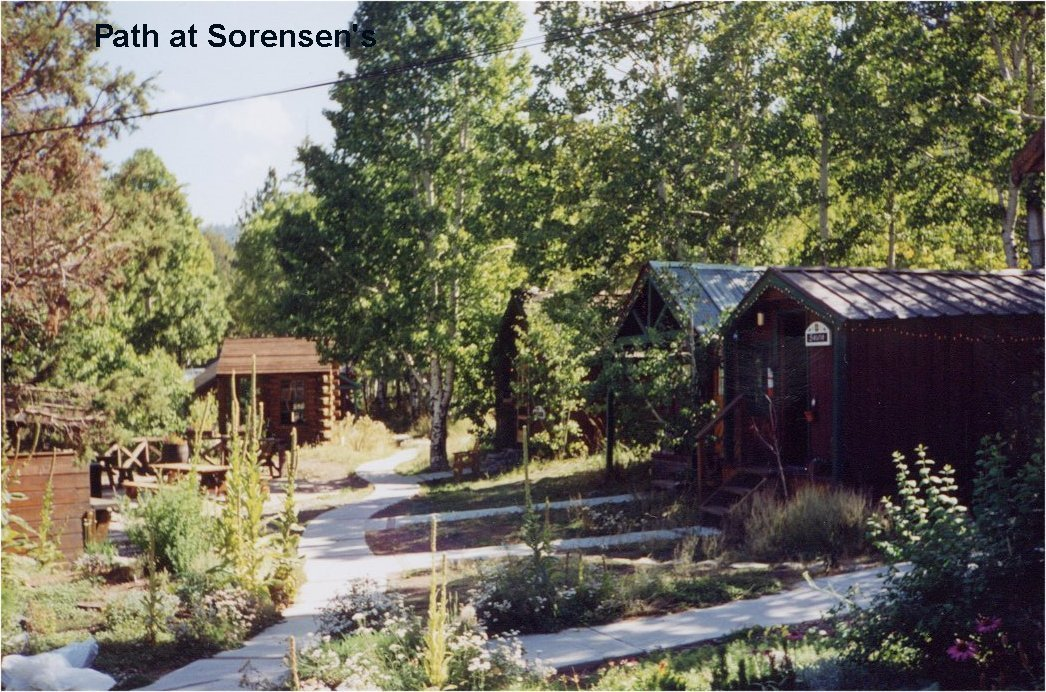

Sorensen's Resort is a mountain resort located just east of Hope Valley in Alpine County, California. Situated on a wide meadow in the upper reaches of Woodfords Canyon alongside the West Fork of the Carson River, the resort consists of a cluster of more than 30 wooden cabins of various sizes and configurations. Founded in 1916, the resort is open year-round.

== History ==
The resort was founded by Martin Sorensen, who immigrated to the United States from Denmark as an 18-year-old in 1890 and found work as a sheep herder in the Carson Valley. By 1905, he had established his own sheepherding enterprise. In 1916, Sorensen and his wife Irene bought a 169 acres (68 ha) property spanning the area where Hope Valley narrows to form Woodfords Canyon. Starting out as a humble campsite, Sorensen soon began to expand the resort, and by the end of the 1920s the property boasted ten rustic cabins that rented for 75 cents a night.

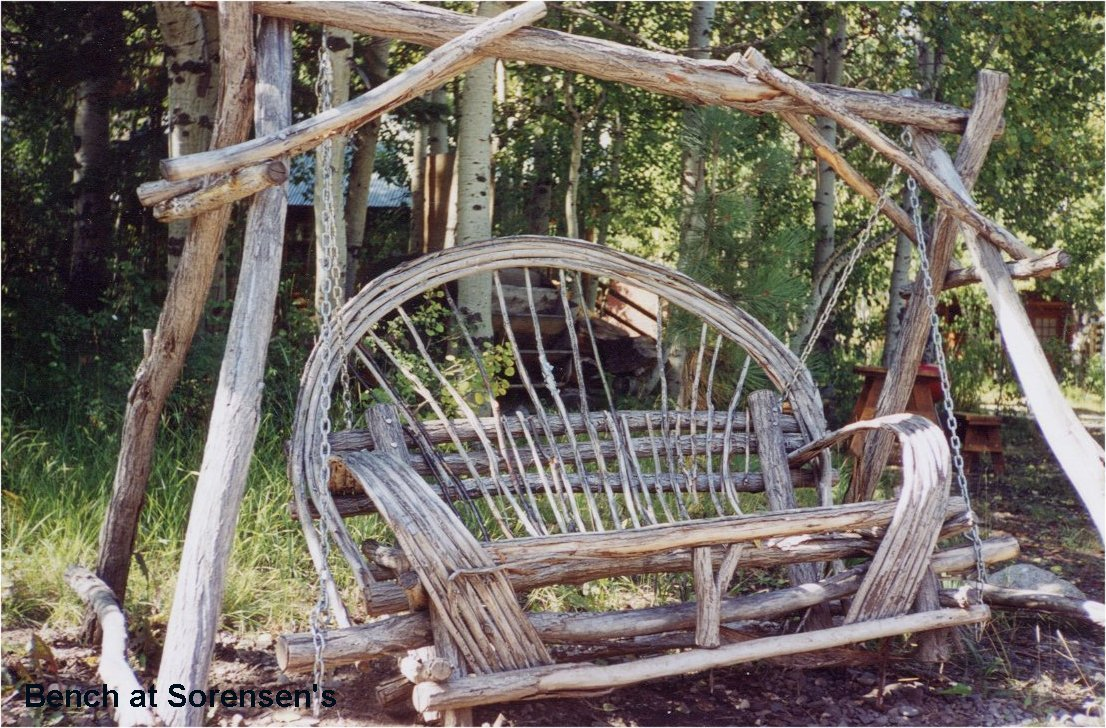

In 1970 the Sorensen family sold the resort, along with an additional 140 acres (57 ha) property, to Swedish immigrant Johan Viking Hultin. As a physician with a practice in Los Gatos, Hultin was an absentee owner, living full-time in his Los Gatos home nearly 200 miles (320 km) away by road. Hultin hired a series of property managers who proved to be unscrupulous and the resort began a sustained decline, becoming infamous in the area for drug use as damage to the cabins accumulated. However, Sorensen's Resort continued to attract some good press, including a mention in National Geographic magazine.

Hultin was an avid cross-country skier who had initially bought the resort with dreams of establishing a large cross-country ski area that would take advantage of the wide-open bottomlands of Hope Valley. This resort did not come to fruition, but under Hultin's ownership, the resort operated the Viggo Nordic cross-country ski school, believed to be the first such school in California. Hultin's last property managers were much more responsible than those who had come before them, and the resort's fortunes began to turn once again as they began renovating the property and repairing the damage that had accumulated over the years.

In 1982, John and Patty Brissenden bought the resort property from Hultin for $410,000. Two years later they moved onto the property, where they would live full-time for the rest of their ownership tenure. The Brissendens continued building up the property, including the addition of the large and luxurious Norway House cabin. Hultin had started the cabin's construction, but it had been poorly planned and did not meet building codes until the Brissendens opened it to the public in 1984. The couple also worked to improve the restaurant, which eventually developed a "world-class wine list".

In 2019, the Brissendens retired after nearly four decades of ownership, and sold the resort to a new owner.

== Facilities ==
The resort property is located just off California State Route 88, about a mile east of its junction with State Route 89. The cabins that make up the resort are scattered amidst evergreens and aspens, backing up to the West Fork of the Carson River. In addition to its lodging facilities, the resort provides hosting for weddings and is home to Sorensen's Country Cafe, one of only two restaurants in the sparsely inhabited Hope Valley area.
