= Scales, California =

Unincorporated community in California, United States

- Unincorporated community
- Location in California Location in the United States
- Coordinates: 39.59823°N 120.9925°W
- Country: United States
- State: California
- County: Sierra County
- Elevation: 4,357 ft (1,328 m)
- Time zone: UTC−8 (Pacific (PST))
  - Summer (DST): UTC−7 (PDT)
- Area code: 530

Scales is an unincorporated community in Sierra County, California, United States.
