= Sand Hill, Oakley, California =

Coordinates: 37°58′25″N 121°41′44″W

Sand Hill is a former unincorporated community now annexed to Oakley in Contra Costa County, California. It lies at an elevation of 43 feet (13 m). It is west of Knightsten on the far edge of the county.
