= Red Lake Peak =

Mountain in the American state of California

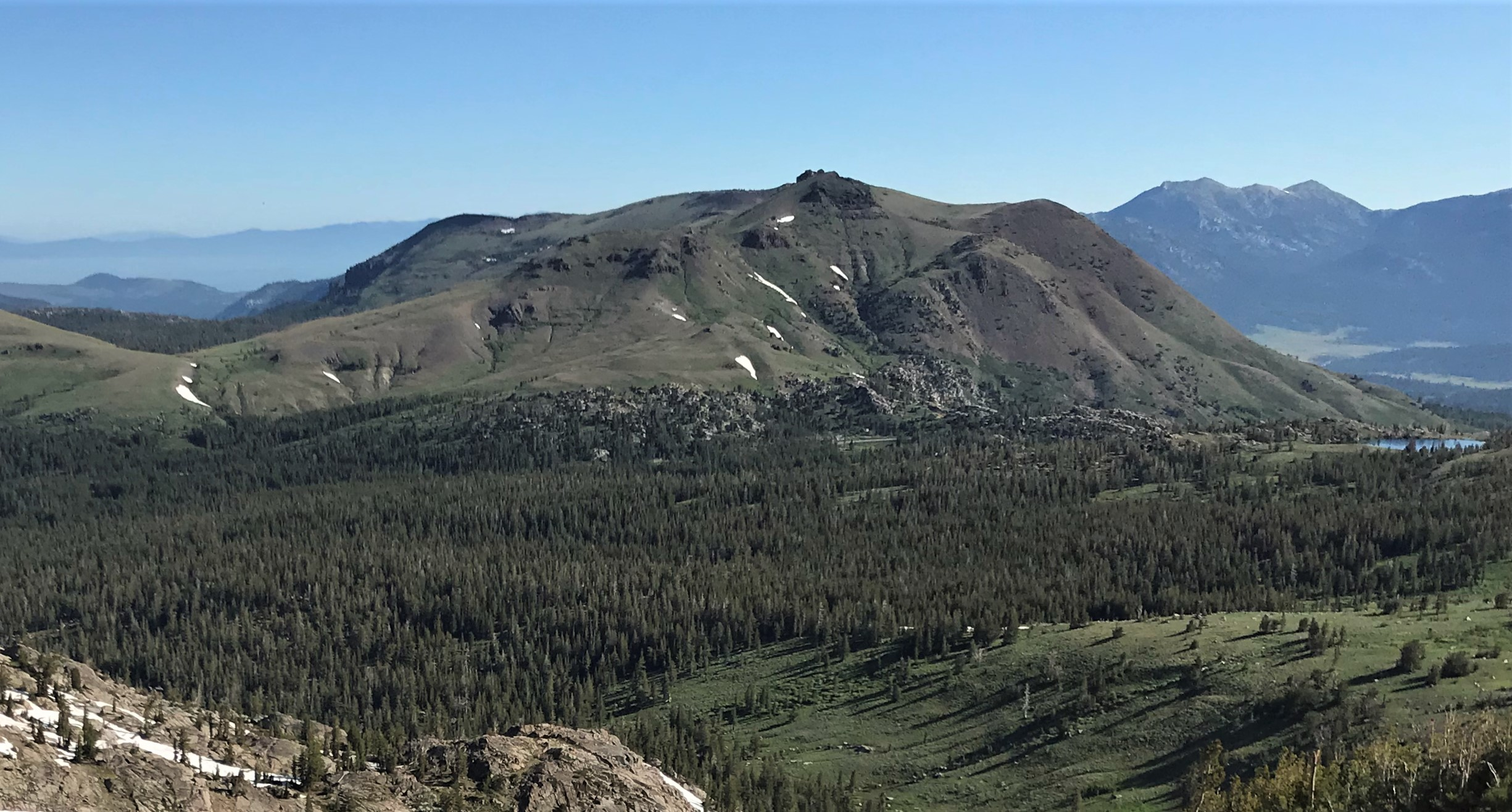
- South aspect

Highest point
- Elevation: 10,068 ft (3,069 m) NAVD 88
- Prominence: 1,463 ft (446 m)
- Parent peak: Round Top (Alpine County)
- Listing: Tahoe OGUL Emblem Peak
- Coordinates: 38°42′51″N 119°59′15″W

Geography
- Location within California
- Location: Alpine County, California, U.S.
- Topo map: USGS Carson Pass

Climbing
- First ascent: February 1844 by John C. Fremont and Charles Preuss

Red Lake Peak (elevation 10,068 feet or 3,069 metres) is believed to be the vantage point from which John C. Fremont and Charles Preuss made the first recorded sighting of Lake Tahoe by Europeans in February 1844 as Fremont's exploratory expedition made a desperate crossing of the Sierra Nevada through what is now Carson Pass on their way to obtain provisions at Sutter's Fort. The peak lies just north of the pass and generally northwest of the small lake east of the pass for which the peak is named. Lake Tahoe and Stevens Peak are visible to the north from the peak. Elephants Back and Round Top can be seen to the south.

== Climate ==
According to the Köppen climate classification system, Red Lake Peak is located in an alpine climate zone. Most weather fronts originate in the Pacific Ocean, and travel east toward the Sierra Nevada mountains. As fronts approach, they are forced upward by the peaks (orographic lift), causing them to drop their moisture in the form of rain or snowfall onto the range.

== Gallery ==
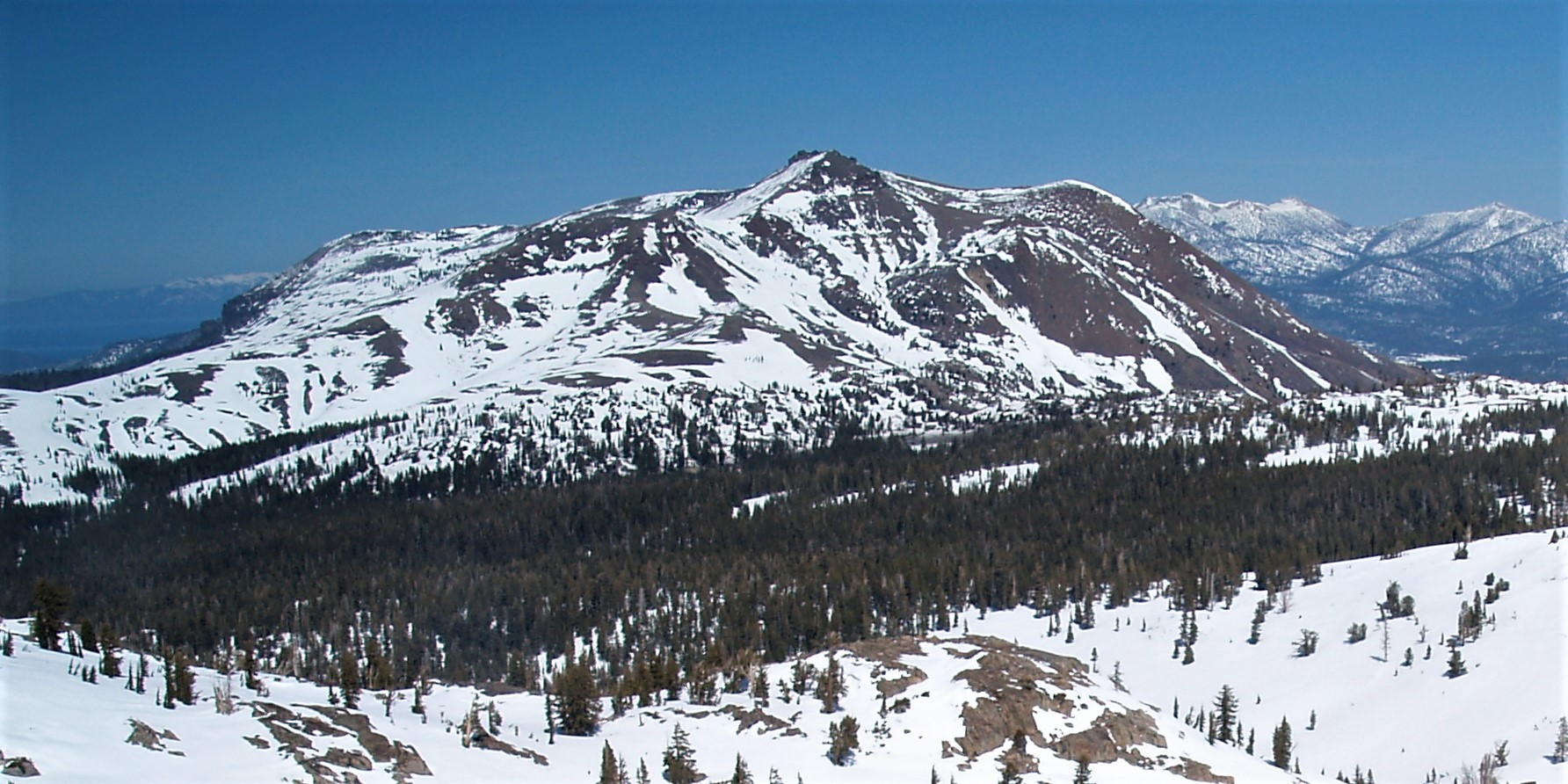
Red Lake Peak, south aspect

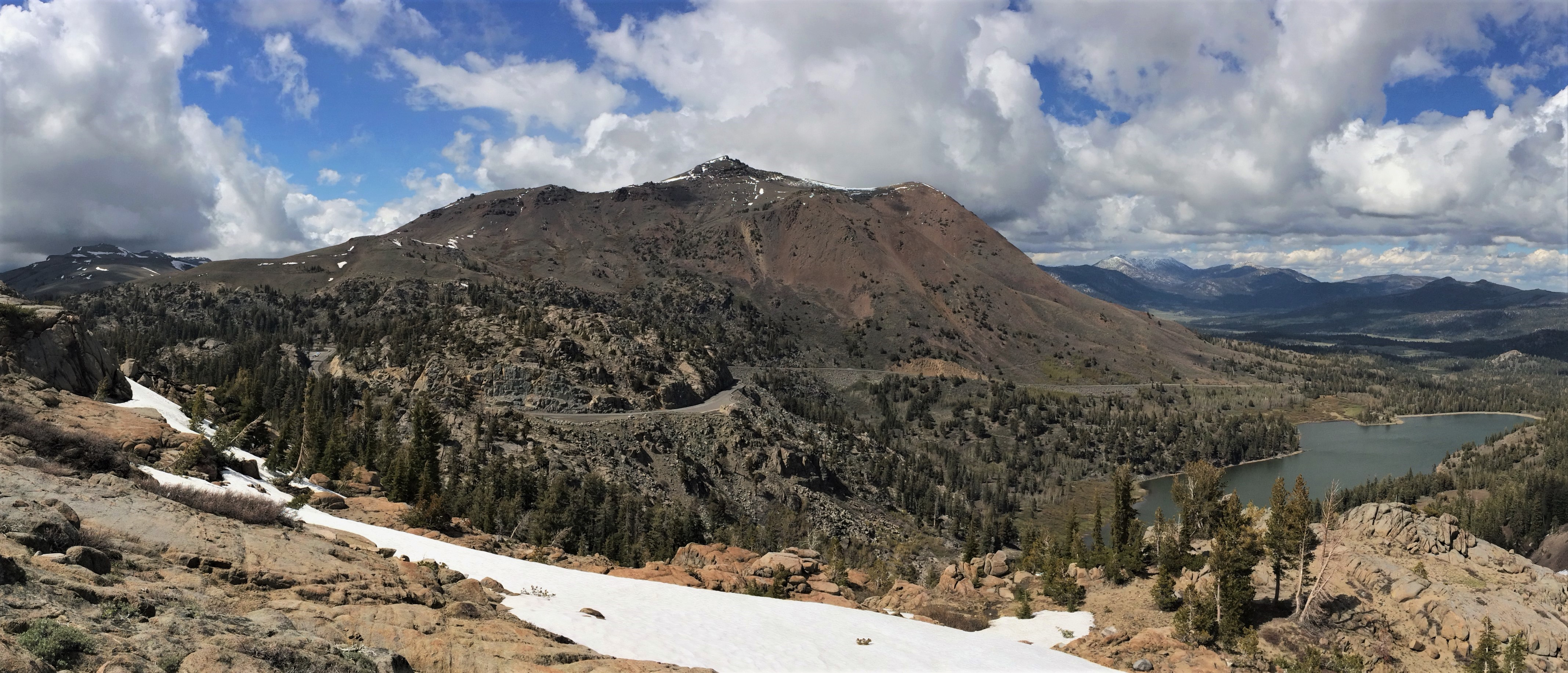
South aspect, with Red Lake to the right

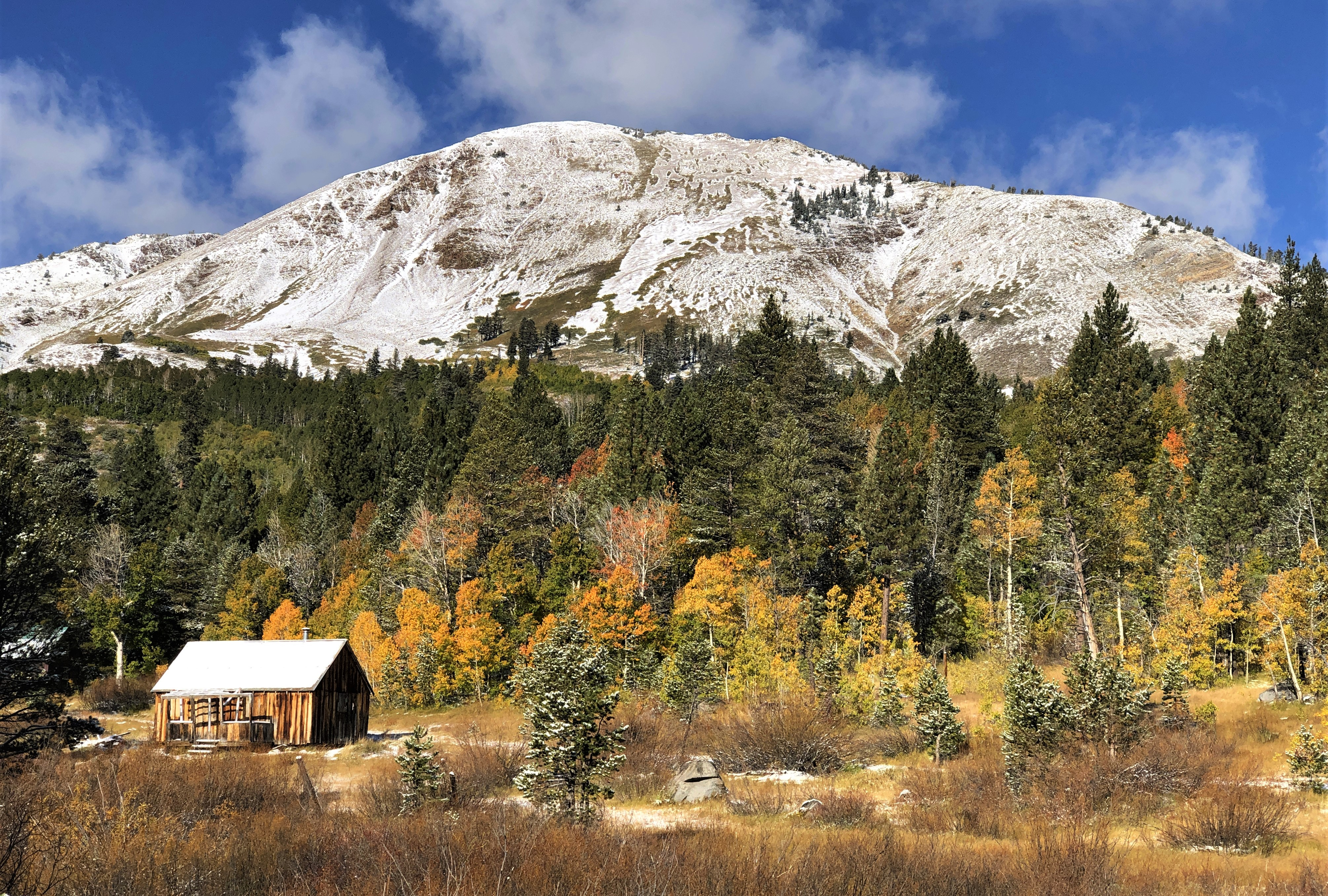
The Hope Valley Cabin and east slope of Red Lake Peak
