= Sunnyslope, Butte County, California =

Unincorporated community in California, United States

Sunnyslope
- Unincorporated community
- Location in California Sunnyslope (the United States)
- Coordinates: 39°22′03″N 121°25′55″W
- Country: United States
- State: California
- County: Butte
- Elevation: 548 ft (167 m)

Sunnyslope is an unincorporated community in Butte County, California, United States.

== History ==
The settlement was founded as Sunnyslope Avocado Nursery in 1912. The nursery was noted for cultivating two new avocado varieties, the Duke and the Benedict.

Sunnyslope was described in 1977 as "an early land colony real estate development". In 2007, Sunnyslope had an estimated population of 20, and was noted as one of 51 "fire threatened communities" in rural Butte County.
