= Sierra Sky Park, California =

Unincorporated community in California, United States

Sierra Sky Park
- Unincorporated community
- Location in California Sierra Sky Park (the United States)
- Coordinates: 36°50′32″N 119°51′57″W
- Country: United States
- State: California
- County: Fresno
- Elevation: 330 ft (100 m)

Sierra Sky Park is a fly-in unincorporated community in Fresno County, California, United States. It is located 7 miles (11 km) northwest of downtown Fresno, at an elevation of 328 feet (100 m).

== See also ==
- Sierra Sky Park Airport
