= South Fork, Madera County, California =

Unincorporated community in California, United States

South Fork
- Unincorporated community
- Location in California South Fork (the United States)
- Coordinates: 37°13′52″N 119°29′39″W
- Country: United States
- State: California
- County: Madera
- Elevation: 2,651 ft (808 m)

South Fork (Mono: qohnihihna ) is an unincorporated community in Madera County, California, United States, associated with the neighboring town of North Fork. It is located 9 miles (14 km) south-southeast of Shuteye Peak, at an elevation of 2651 feet (808 m). South Fork lacks a post-office or any distinguishing features aside from a motel resembling one featured in a celebrated Alfred Hitchcock film.
