= Washeshu Peak =

Mountain in the state of California

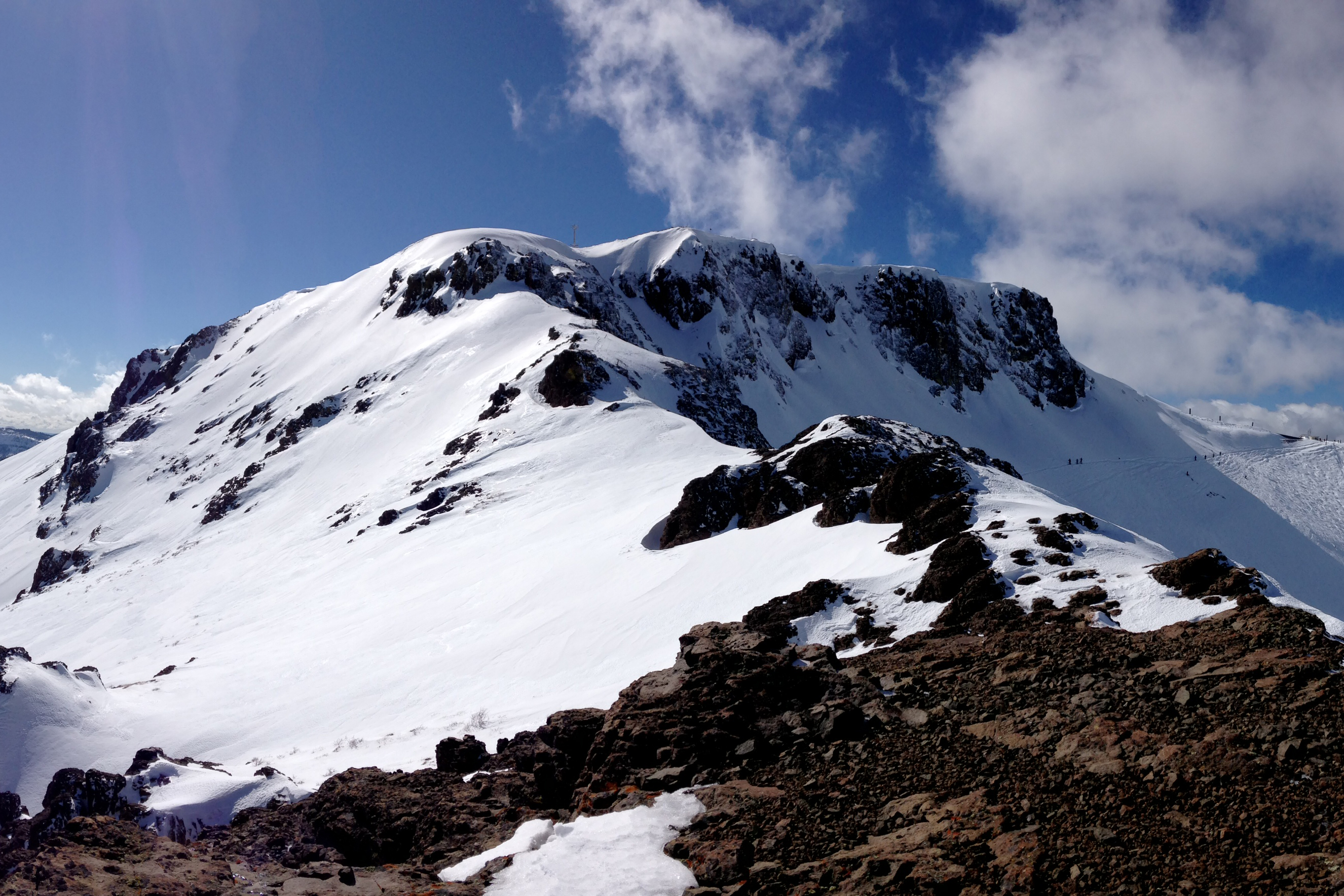
- Northeast aspect

Highest point
- Elevation: 8,855 ft (2,699 m)
- Prominence: 407 ft (124 m)
- Parent peak: Granite Chief (9,010 ft)
- Isolation: 1.54 mi (2.48 km)
- Coordinates: 39°10′50″N 120°16′11″W

Naming
- Etymology: Wašišiw

Geography
- Location within California Location within the United States
- Country: United States of America
- State: California
- County: Placer
- Protected area: Tahoe National Forest
- Parent range: Sierra Nevada
- Topo map: USGS Granite Chief

Geology
- Rock type: Volcanic rock

Climbing
- Easiest route: class 1 hiking

Washeshu Peak is an 8,855-foot-elevation (2,699-meter) mountain summit in Placer County, California, United States.

== Description ==
Washeshu Peak is located in the Tahoe National Forest, with the boundary of the Granite Chief Wilderness crossing the peak's south slope. It ranks as the fourth-highest peak in Placer County. The peak is situated on the crest of the Sierra Nevada mountain range, with precipitation runoff from the peak draining north into headwaters of Washeshu Creek which is a tributary of the Truckee River, and south to Rubicon River via Five Lakes Creek. Topographic relief is significant as the summit rises 1,855 feet (565 meters) above Whiskey Creek in 0.75 miles (1.21 km). Neighbors include line parent Granite Chief 1.54 miles (2.48 km) to the northwest, and Needle Peak is 2.2 miles (3.5 km) northwest. The Palisades Tahoe ski area is immediately northeast of Washeshu Peak, and the Pacific Crest Trail traverses the western base of the peak. Washeshu or "Wa She Shu" is a transliteration from the Wašišiw people, the original inhabitants of this Lake Tahoe area. This mountain's toponym was officially adopted on September 8, 2022, by the U.S. Board on Geographic Names, replacing the offensive "Squaw Peak" name which had existed since at least 1899. The 1899 publication listed the elevation of the peak as 8,960-ft which is higher than today's elevation because the summit was truncated and leveled in the 1960s by the Federal Aviation Administration to install radio range equipment for airline navigation.

== Climate ==
According to the Köppen climate classification system, Washeshu Peak is located in an alpine climate zone. Most weather fronts originate in the Pacific Ocean and travel east toward the Sierra Nevada mountains. As fronts approach, they are forced upward by the peaks (orographic lift), causing them to drop their moisture in the form of rain or snowfall onto the range. This climate supports ski runs of Palisades Tahoe on the peak's north slope.

== Gallery ==
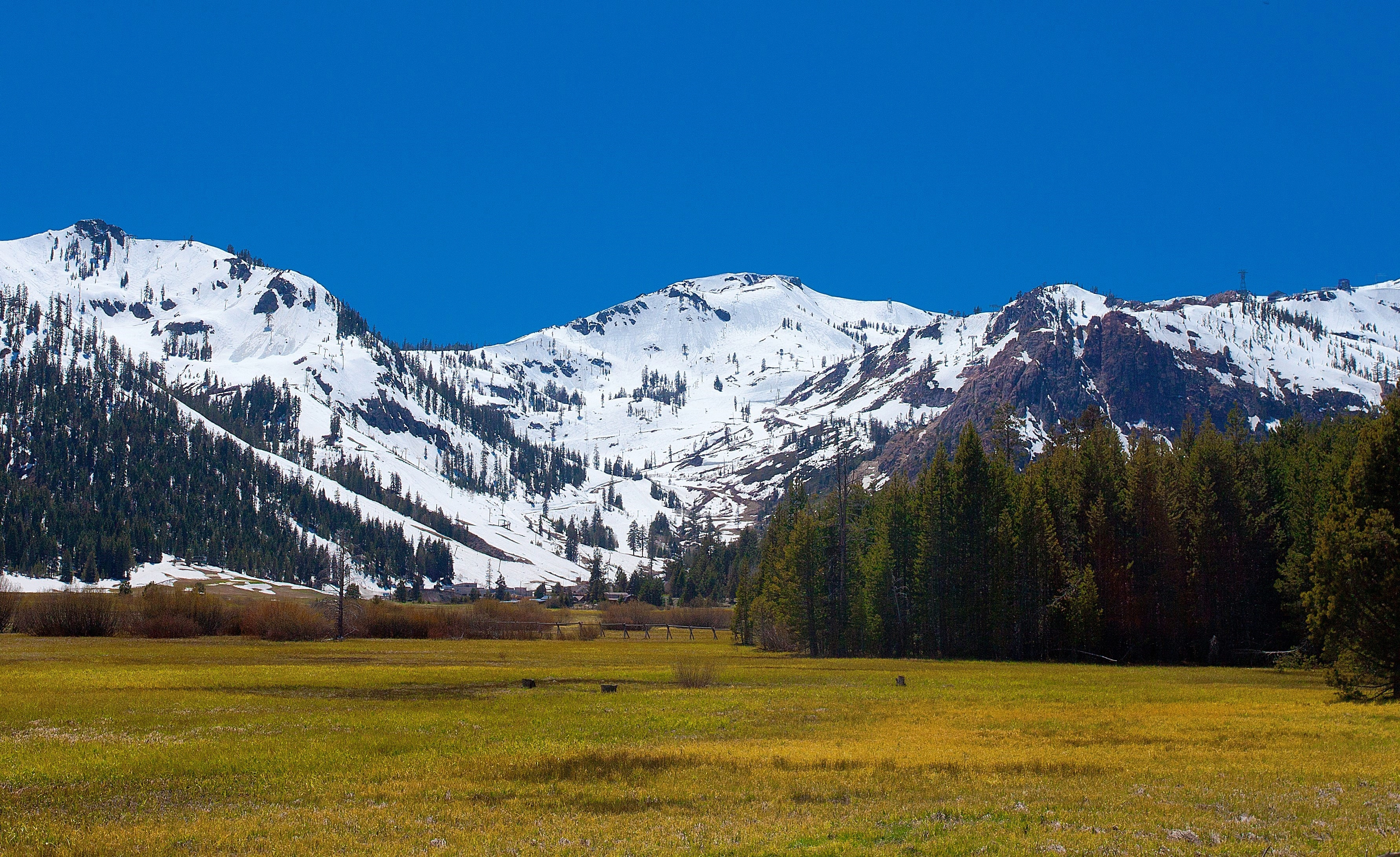
Washeshu Peak centered, viewed from Olympic Valley

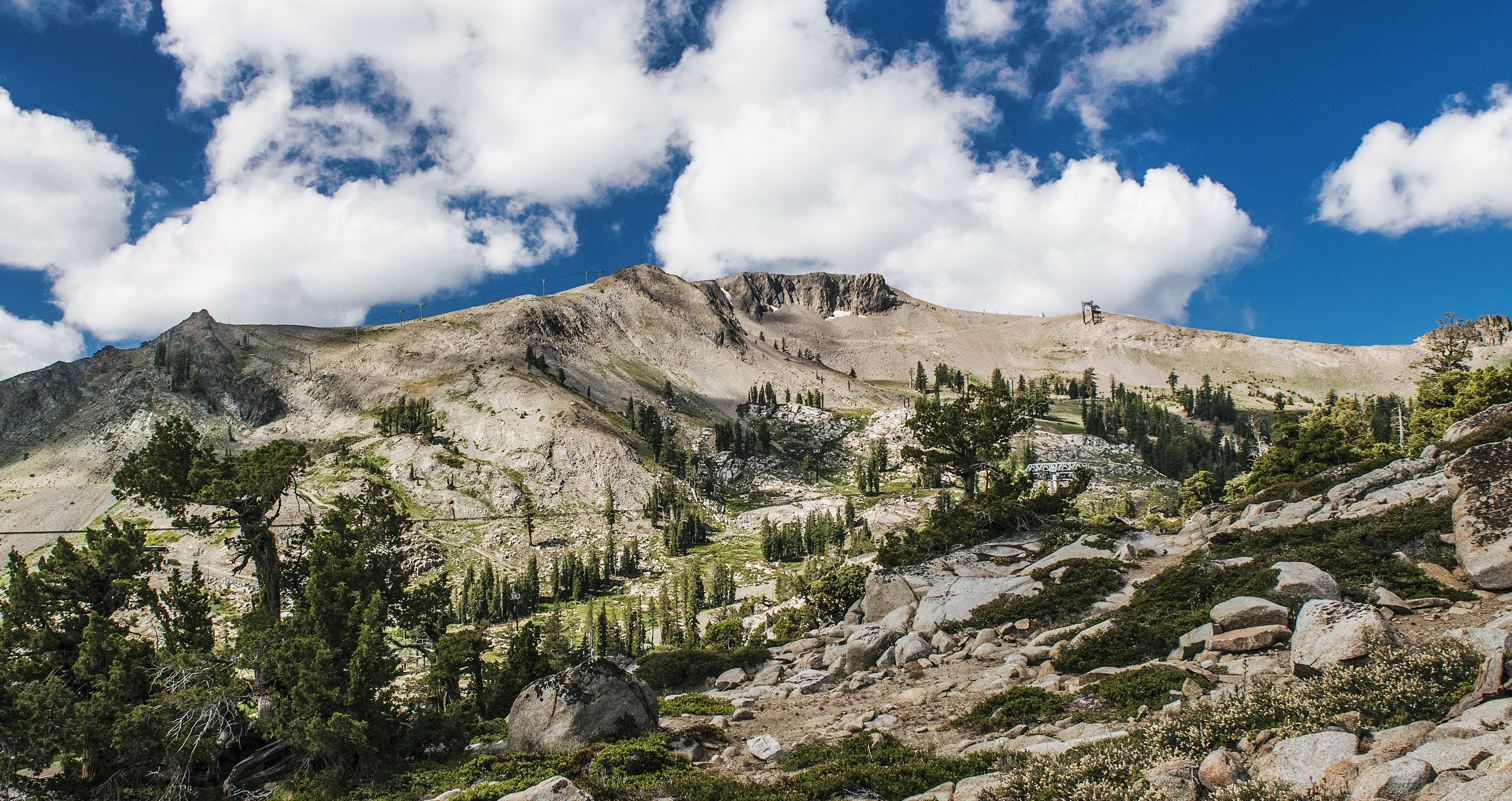
Washeshu Peak in summer

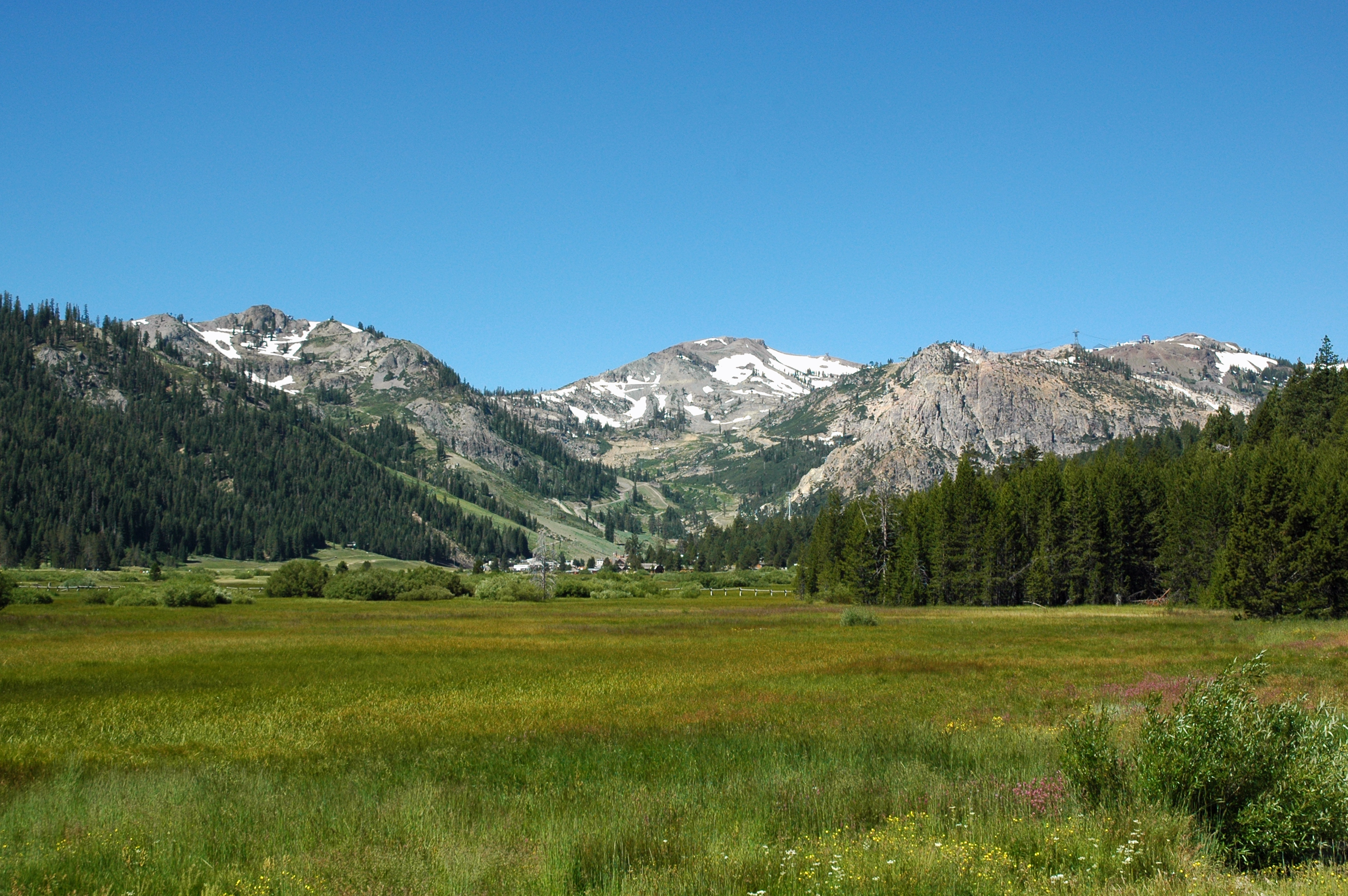
Washeshu Peak centered in the distance, viewed from Olympic Meadow

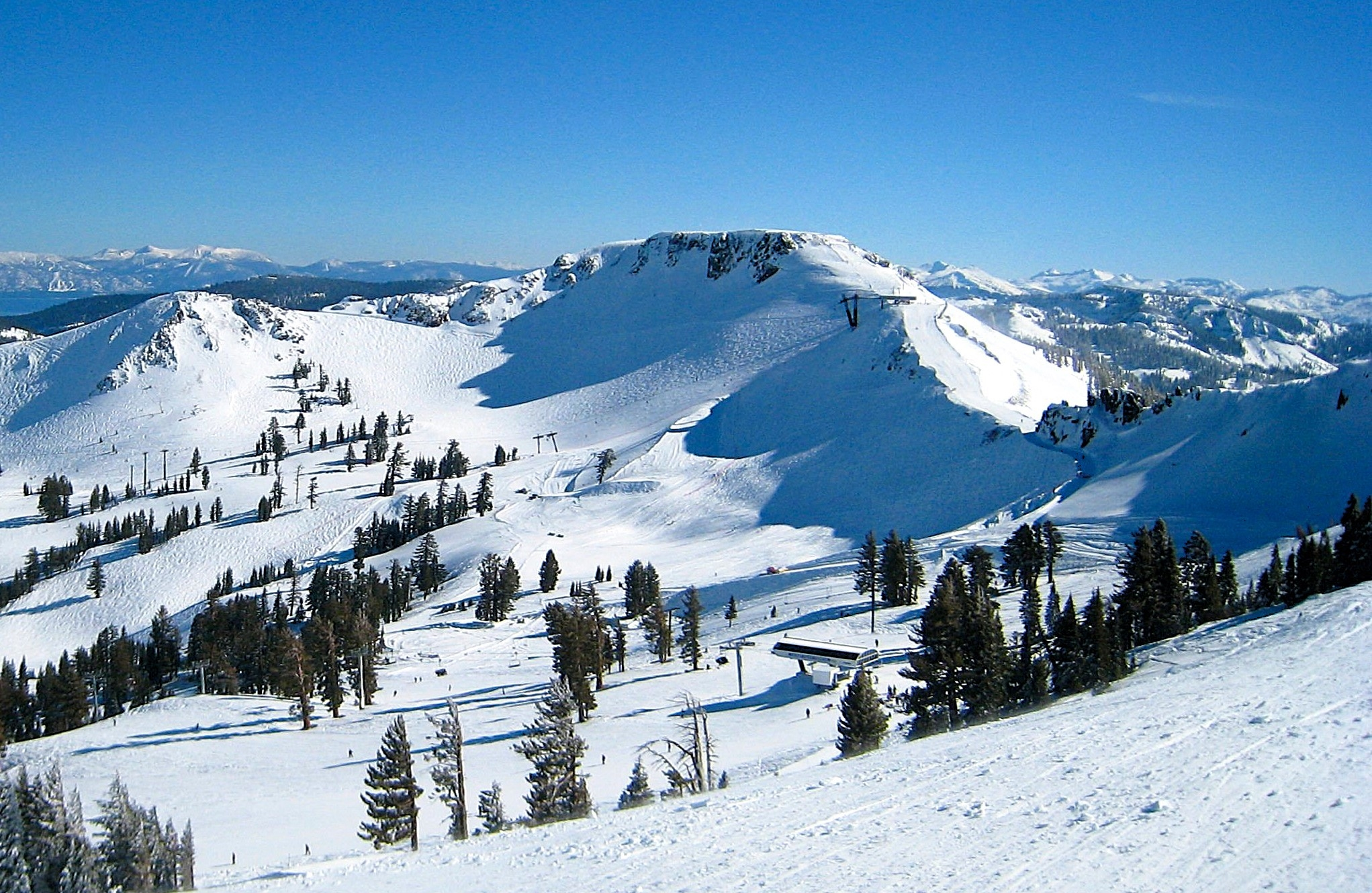
North aspect

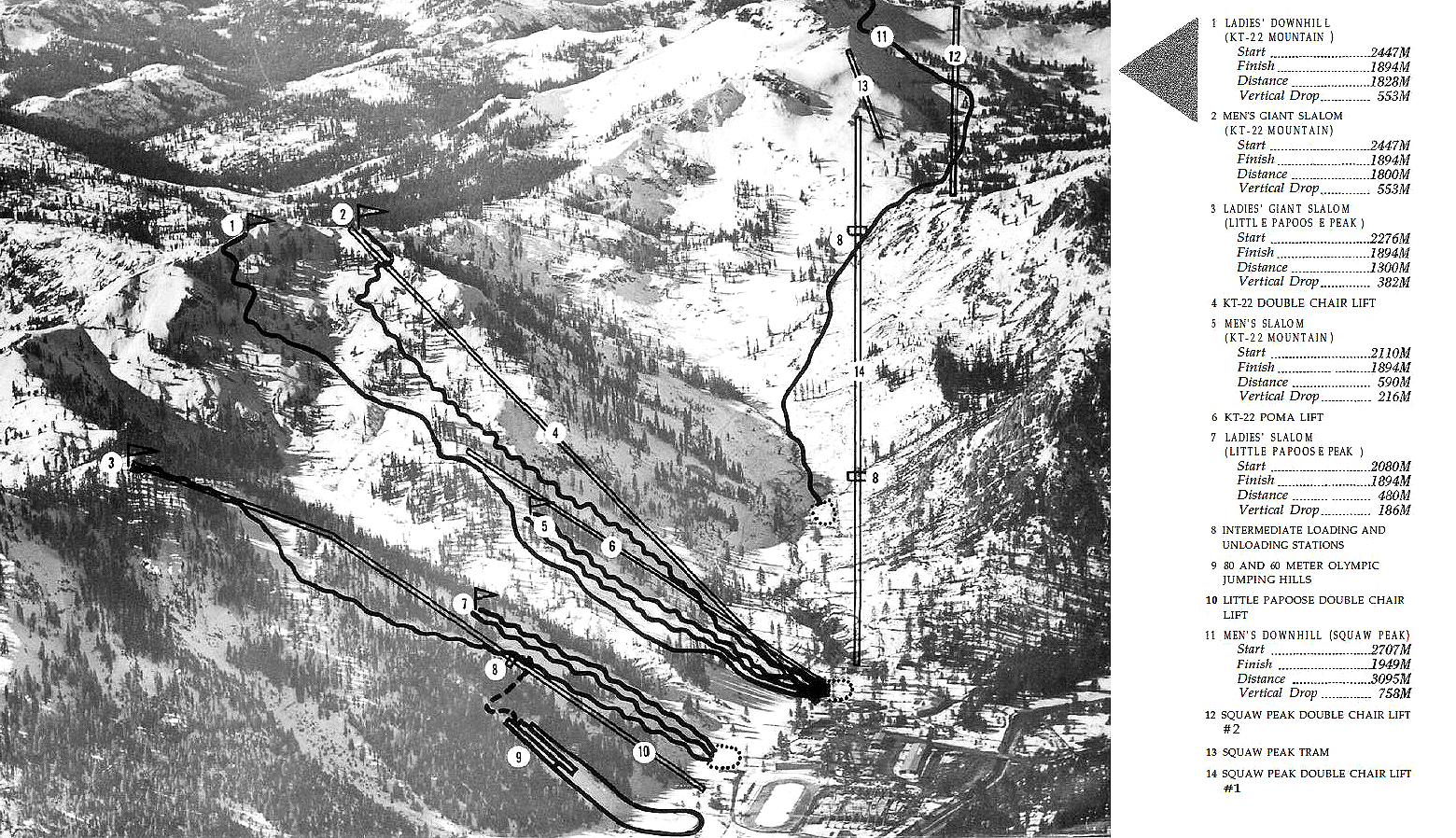
Washeshu Peak (then Squaw Peak) was the venue for the Men's Downhill event at the 1960 Winter Olympics
