= Lyon Peak (California) =

Mountain in the state of California

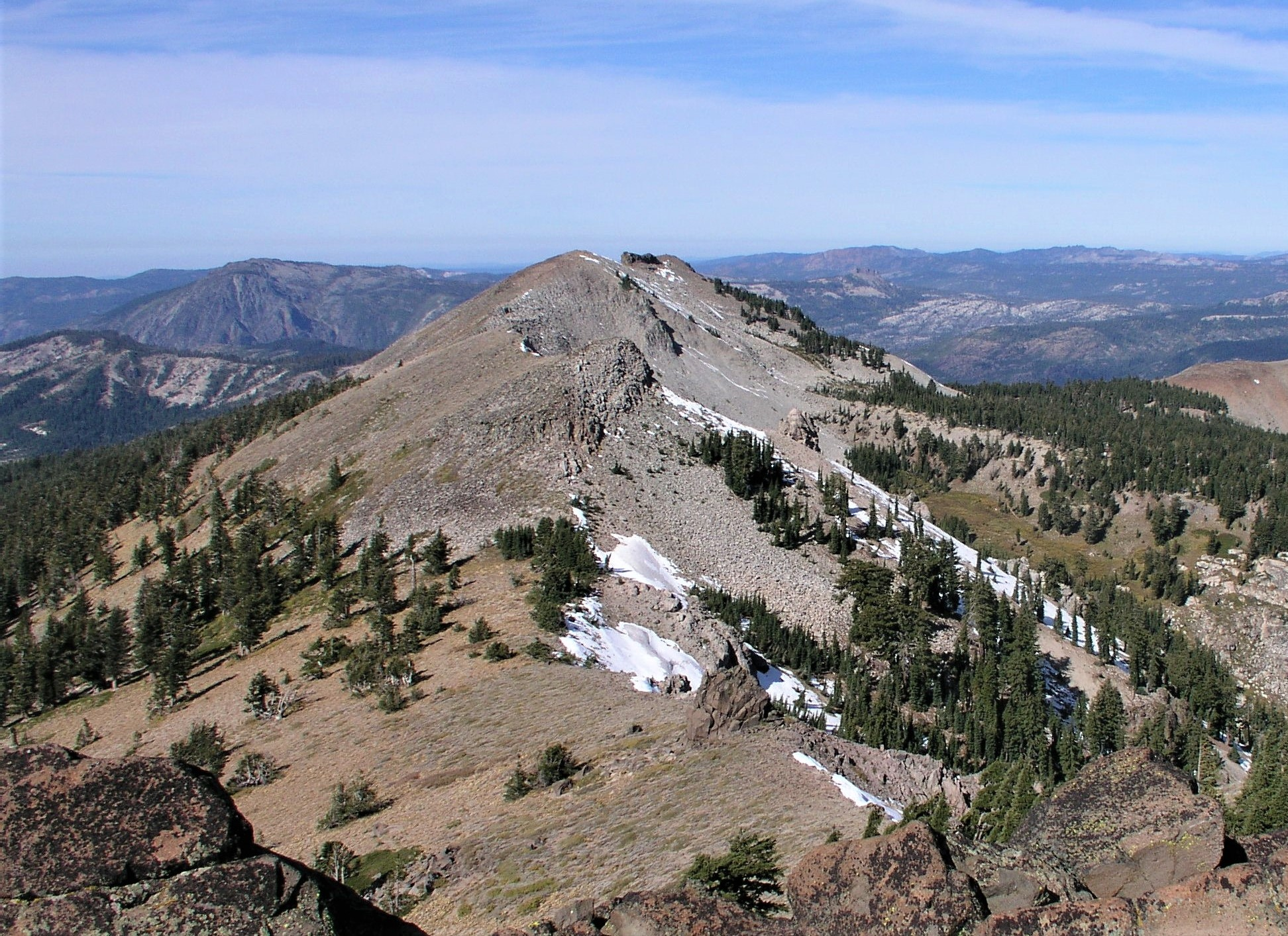
- Southeast aspect, from Needle Peak

Highest point
- Elevation: 8,891 ft (2,710 m)
- Prominence: 251 ft (77 m)
- Parent peak: Needle Peak (8,971 ft)
- Isolation: 0.88 mi (1.42 km)
- Coordinates: 39°12′24″N 120°18′56″W

Geography
- Location within California Location within the United States
- Location: Granite Chief Wilderness
- Country: United States of America
- State: California
- County: Placer
- Parent range: Sierra Nevada
- Topo map: USGS Granite Chief

Lyon Peak is an 8,891-foot-elevation (2,710-meter) mountain summit in Placer County, California, United States.

== Description ==
Lyon Peak is located in the Granite Chief Wilderness on land managed by Tahoe National Forest. It is situated two miles west of the crest of the Sierra Nevada mountain range, with precipitation runoff from the peak draining north into headwaters of North Fork American River, and south into headwaters of Middle Fork American River. Topographic relief is modest as the summit rises 2,900 feet (880 meters) above the Middle Fork in 1.5 mile. Neighbors include Tinker Knob 3.1 miles (5.0 km) to the north-northeast, Granite Chief 1.6 miles (2.6 km) to the east-southeast, and line parent Needle Peak is 0.9 miles (1.4 km) east-southeast. The Palisades Tahoe ski area is four miles east of Lyon Peak. This landform's toponym has been officially adopted by the U.S. Board on Geographic Names, and has appeared in publications since at least 1915.

== Climate ==
According to the Köppen climate classification system, Lyon Peak is located in an alpine climate zone. Most weather fronts originate in the Pacific Ocean and travel east toward the Sierra Nevada mountains. As fronts approach, they are forced upward by the peaks (orographic lift), causing them to drop their moisture in the form of rain or snowfall onto the range.
