= Anderson Peak (Placer County, California) =

Mountain in the state of California

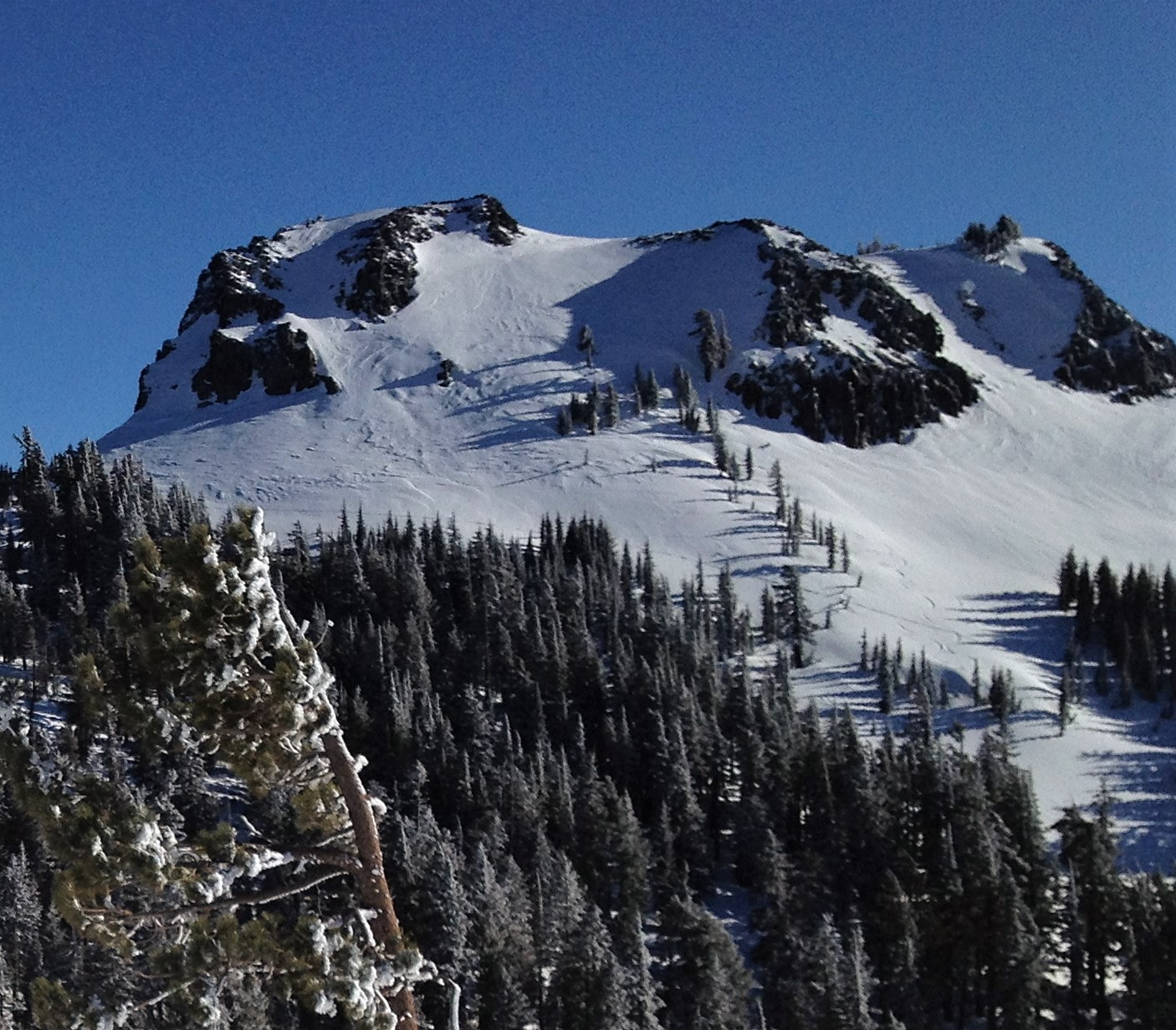
- North aspect

Highest point
- Elevation: 8,683 ft (2,647 m)
- Prominence: 163 ft (50 m)
- Parent peak: Tinker Knob (8,949 ft)
- Isolation: 1.18 mi (1.90 km)
- Coordinates: 39°15′33″N 120°17′50″W

Geography
- Location within California Location within the United States
- Country: United States of America
- State: California
- County: Placer
- Parent range: Sierra Nevada
- Topo map: USGS Norden

Geology
- Rock type: Volcanic rock

Climbing
- Easiest route: class 1 hiking

Anderson Peak is an 8,683-foot-elevation (2,647-meter) mountain summit in Placer County, California, United States.

== Description ==
Anderson Peak is located 4 miles (6.4 km) south-southeast of Donner Pass, on land managed by Tahoe National Forest. It is situated on the crest of the Sierra Nevada mountain range, with precipitation runoff from the peak draining west to North Fork American River and east to the Truckee River via South Fork Cold Creek. Topographic relief is modest as the summit rises nearly 2,700 feet (820 meters) above North Fork American River in two miles. Neighbors include Mount Lincoln 2.6 miles (4.2 km) to the northwest, and line parent Tinker Knob is 1.2 miles (1.9 km) to the southeast. The Pacific Crest Trail traverses the peak, providing an approach option from Donner Pass or Palisades Tahoe. The Sierra Club's Benson Hut is set below the north face of the peak. This landform's toponym has been officially adopted by the U.S. Board on Geographic Names.

== Climate ==
According to the Köppen climate classification system, Anderson Peak is located in an alpine climate zone. Most weather fronts originate in the Pacific Ocean and travel east toward the Sierra Nevada mountains. As fronts approach, they are forced upward by the peaks (orographic lift), causing them to drop their moisture in the form of rain or snowfall onto the range.

== Gallery ==
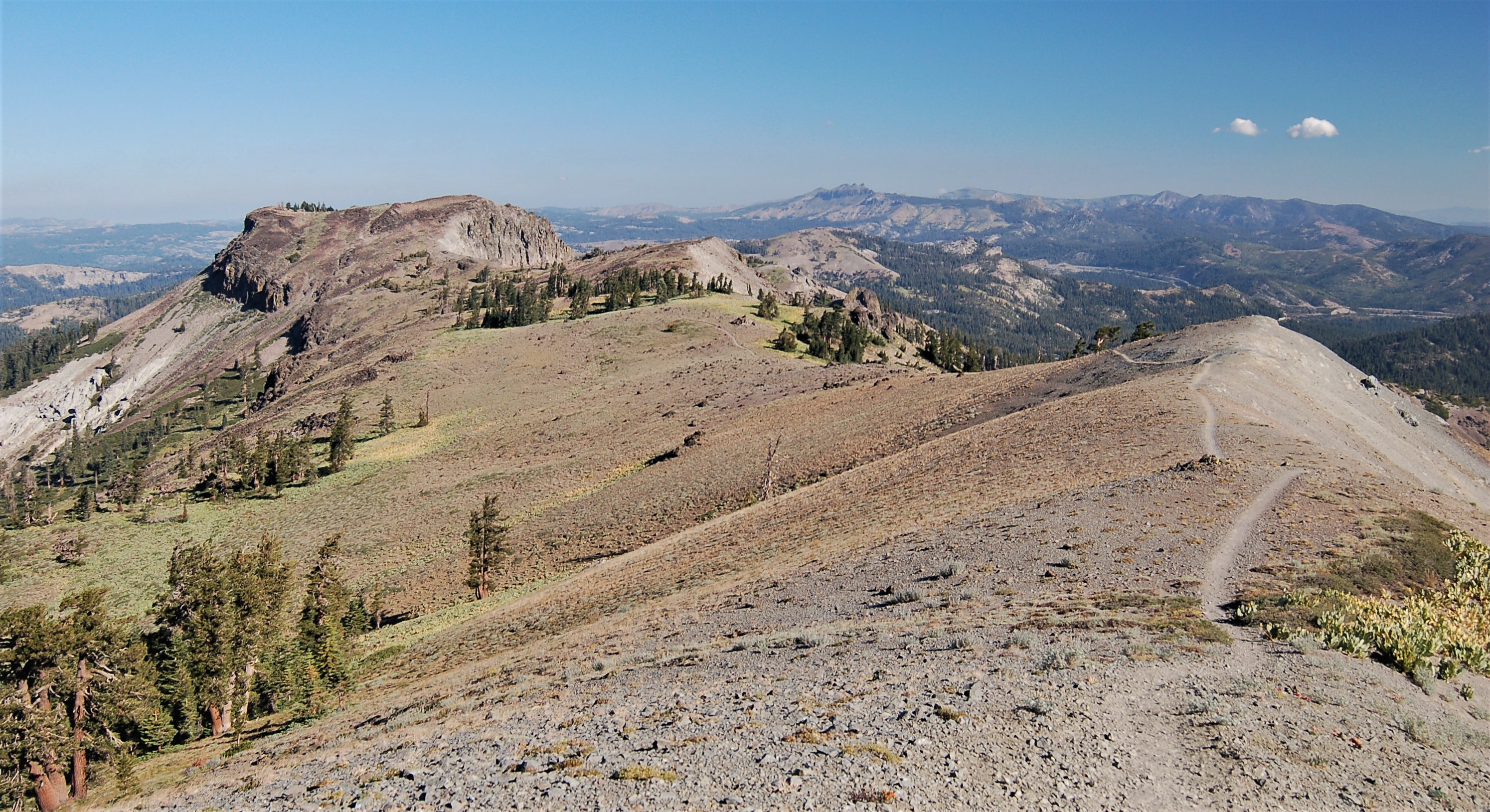
Southeast aspect of Anderson Peak (left) seen from Pacific Crest Trail

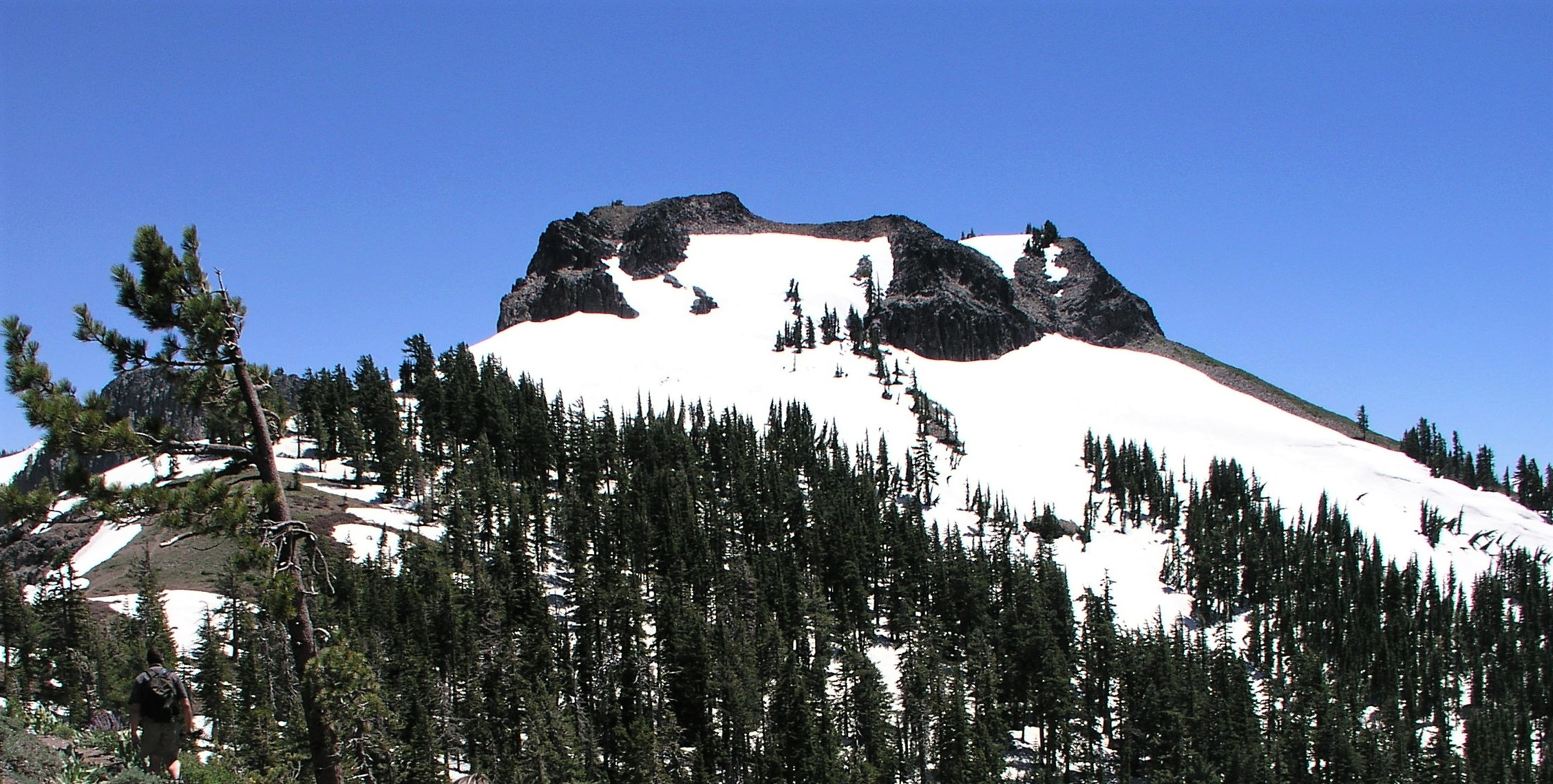
North aspect, from PCT
