= Needle Peak (Placer County, California) =

Mountain in the state of California

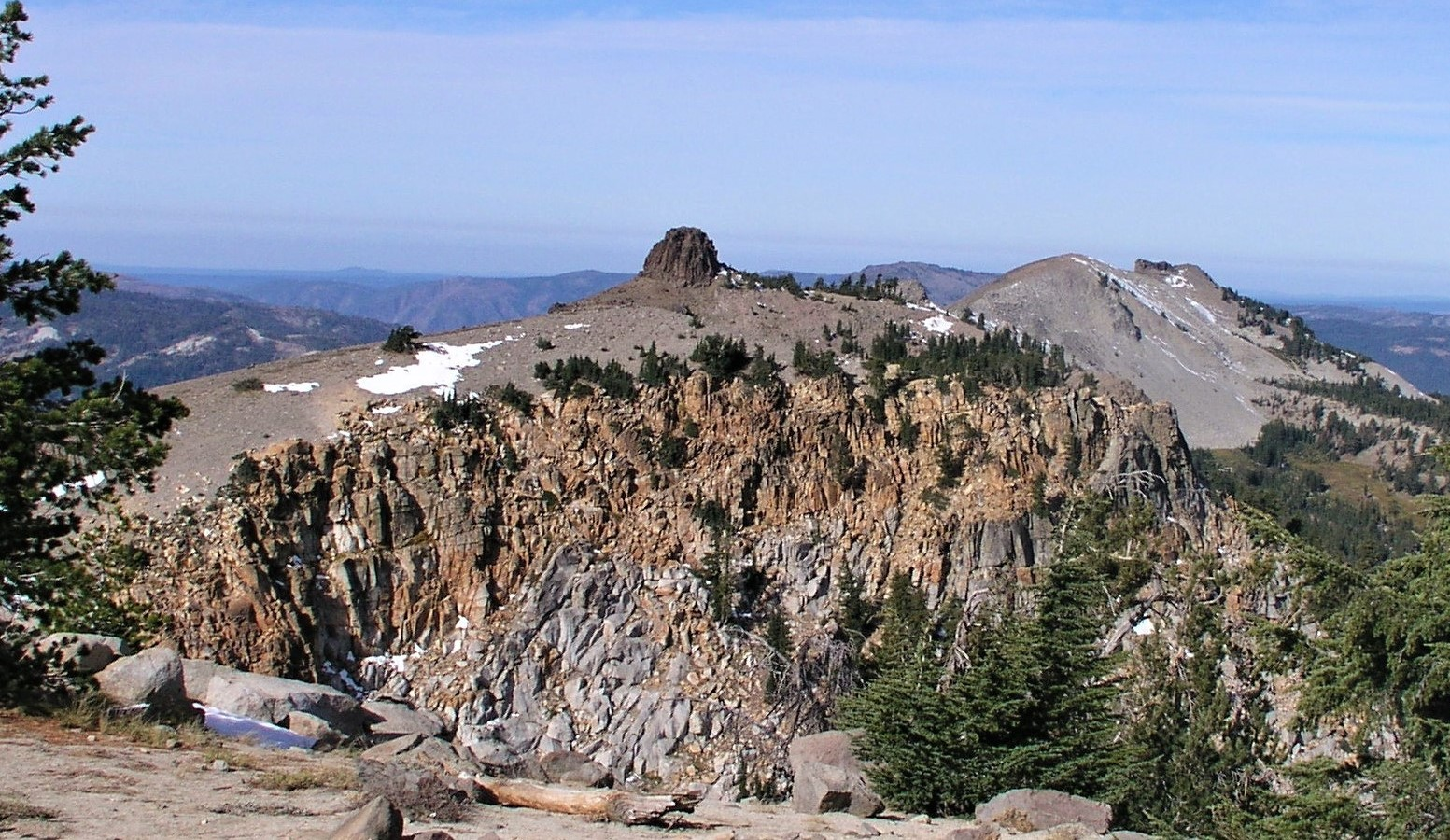
- East aspect, centered at top (Lyon Peak upper right)

Highest point
- Elevation: 8,971 ft (2,734 m)
- Prominence: 331 ft (101 m)
- Parent peak: Granite Chief (9,010 ft)
- Isolation: 0.78 mi (1.26 km)
- Listing: Tahoe OGUL Peak
- Coordinates: 39°12′02″N 120°18′04″W

Geography
- Location within California Location within the United States
- Country: United States of America
- State: California
- County: Placer
- Protected area: Granite Chief Wilderness
- Parent range: Sierra Nevada
- Topo map: USGS Granite Chief

Climbing
- Easiest route: class 2

Needle Peak is an 8,971-foot-elevation (2,734-meter) mountain summit in Placer County, California, United States.

== Description ==
Needle Peak is located in the Granite Chief Wilderness on land managed by Tahoe National Forest. It is situated one mile west of the crest of the Sierra Nevada mountain range, with precipitation runoff from the peak draining north into headwaters of North Fork American River, and south into headwaters of Middle Fork American River. Topographic relief is modest as the summit rises 2,980 feet (910 meters) above the Middle Fork in 1.5 mile. Neighbors include Tinker Knob 3.2 miles (5.1 km) to the north, line parent Granite Chief 0.78 miles (1.26 km) to the east-southeast, and Lyon Peak is 0.9 miles (1.4 km) west-northwest. The Palisades Tahoe ski area is three miles east of Needle Peak. This landform's descriptive toponym has been officially adopted by the U.S. Board on Geographic Names, and has appeared in publications since at least 1899.

== Climate ==
According to the Köppen climate classification system, Needle Peak is located in an alpine climate zone. Most weather fronts originate in the Pacific Ocean and travel east toward the Sierra Nevada mountains. As fronts approach, they are forced upward by the peaks (orographic lift), causing them to drop their moisture in the form of rain or snowfall onto the range.

== Gallery ==
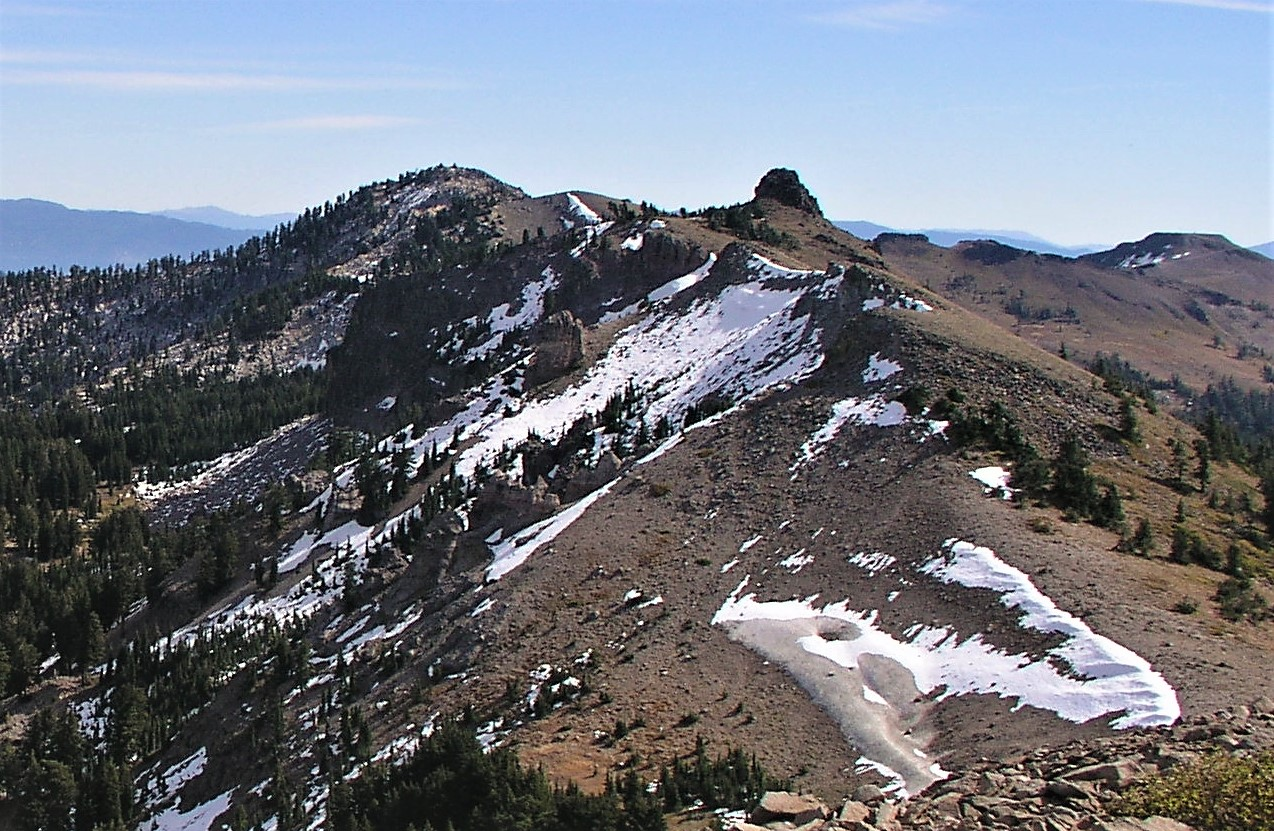
Looking ESE at Granite Chief, Needle Peak (right of center), from Lyon Peak

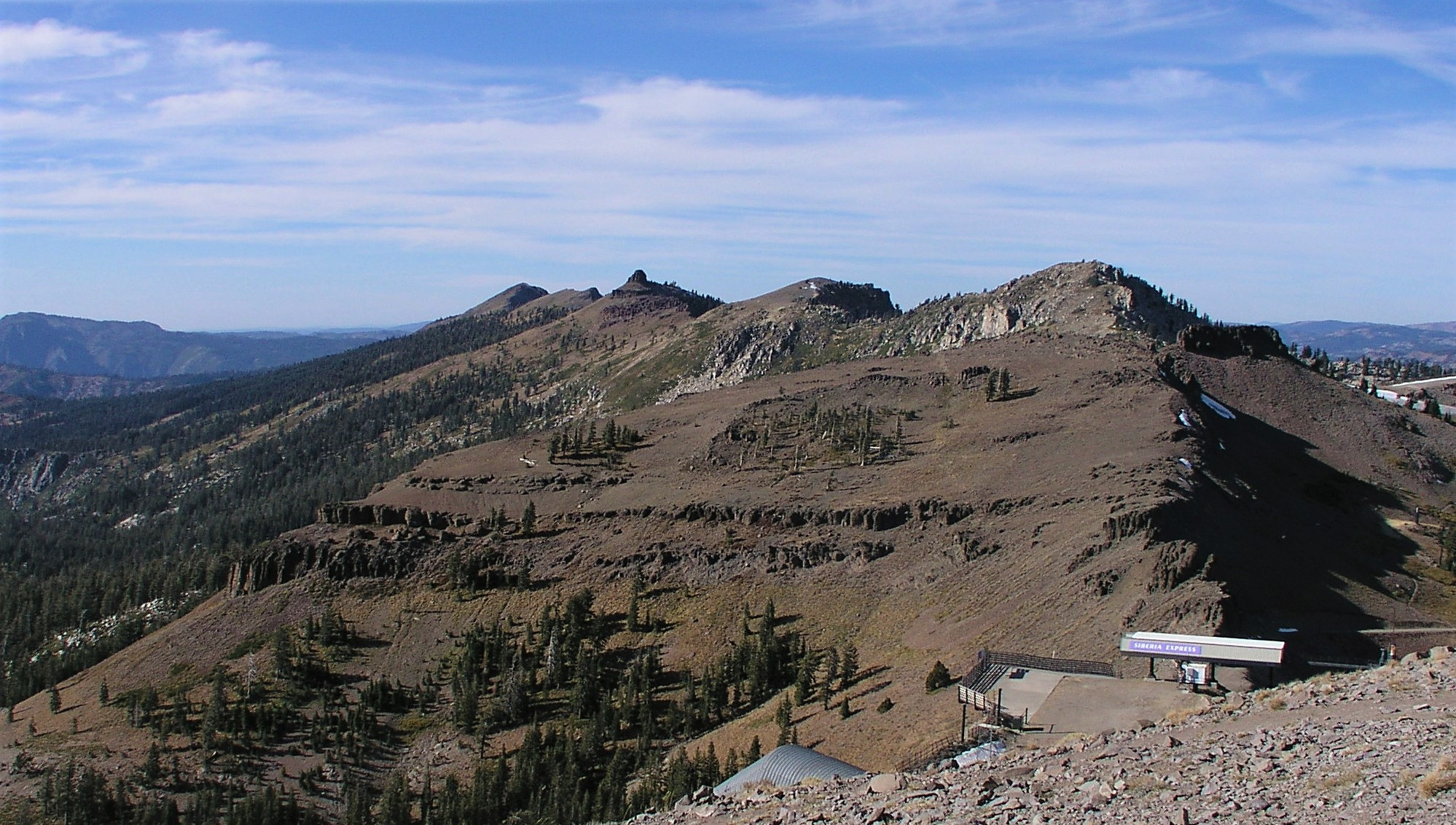
Looking northwest at Granite Chief, Needle Peak and Lyon Peak from Squaw Peak
