= Tinker Knob =

Mountain in the state of California

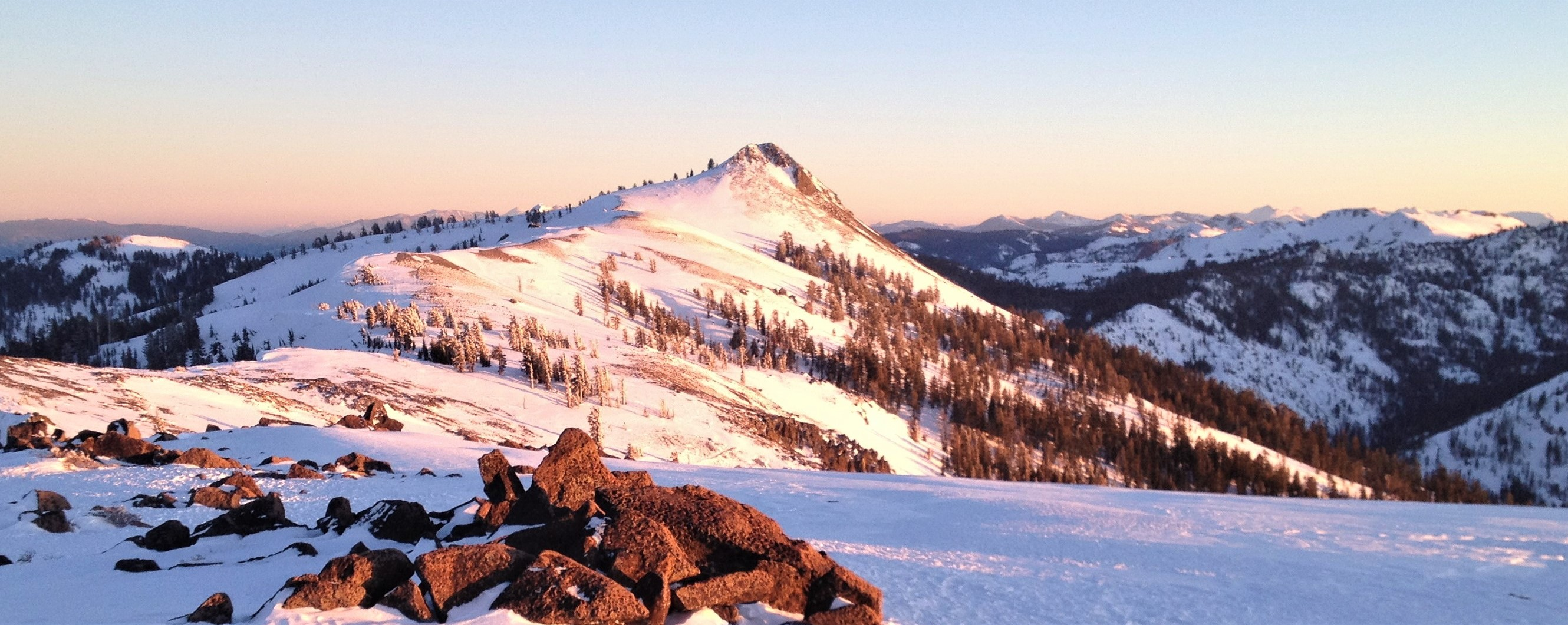
- Northwest aspect, from Anderson Peak

Highest point
- Elevation: 8,949 ft (2,728 m)
- Prominence: 1,029 ft (314 m)
- Parent peak: Granite Chief (9,010 ft)
- Isolation: 3.18 mi (5.12 km)
- Listing: Sierra Peaks Section
- Coordinates: 39°14′41″N 120°17′06″W

Naming
- Etymology: James A. Tinker

Geography
- Location within California Location within the United States
- Country: United States of America
- State: California
- County: Placer
- Parent range: Sierra Nevada
- Topo map: USGS Granite Chief

Geology
- Rock age: Pliocene
- Mountain type: Volcanic vent
- Rock type: Andesite

Climbing
- Easiest route: class 2 hiking

Tinker Knob is an 8,949-foot-elevation (2,728-meter) mountain summit in Placer County, California, United States.

== Description ==
Tinker Knob is located 5.5 miles (8.9 km) south-southeast of Donner Pass and 10 miles (16 km) northwest of Lake Tahoe, on land managed by Tahoe National Forest. It is situated on the crest of the Sierra Nevada mountain range, with precipitation runoff from the peak draining west to North Fork American River and east to the Truckee River via Deep Creek and Cold Creek. Topographic relief is modest as the summit rises 2,350 feet (720 meters) above North Fork American River in one mile. Neighbors include Anderson Peak 1.2 miles (1.9 km) northwest, Mount Lincoln 3.8 miles (6.1 km) to the northwest, and line parent Granite Chief is 3.2 miles (5.1 km) to the south. The Pacific Crest Trail traverses the peak, providing an approach option from Donner Pass or Palisades Tahoe, and inclusion on the Sierra Peaks Section peakbagging list generates climbing interest.

== History ==
This landform's toponym has been officially adopted by the U.S. Board on Geographic Names, and has appeared in publications since at least 1874. The name commemorates James A. Tinker, a freight-hauling teamster whose road between Tinker's Station (now known as Soda Springs) and gold mines at Foresthill Divide passed below this peak to the west. More specifically, the landform's name is a humorous reference to a resemblance to Tinker's nose.

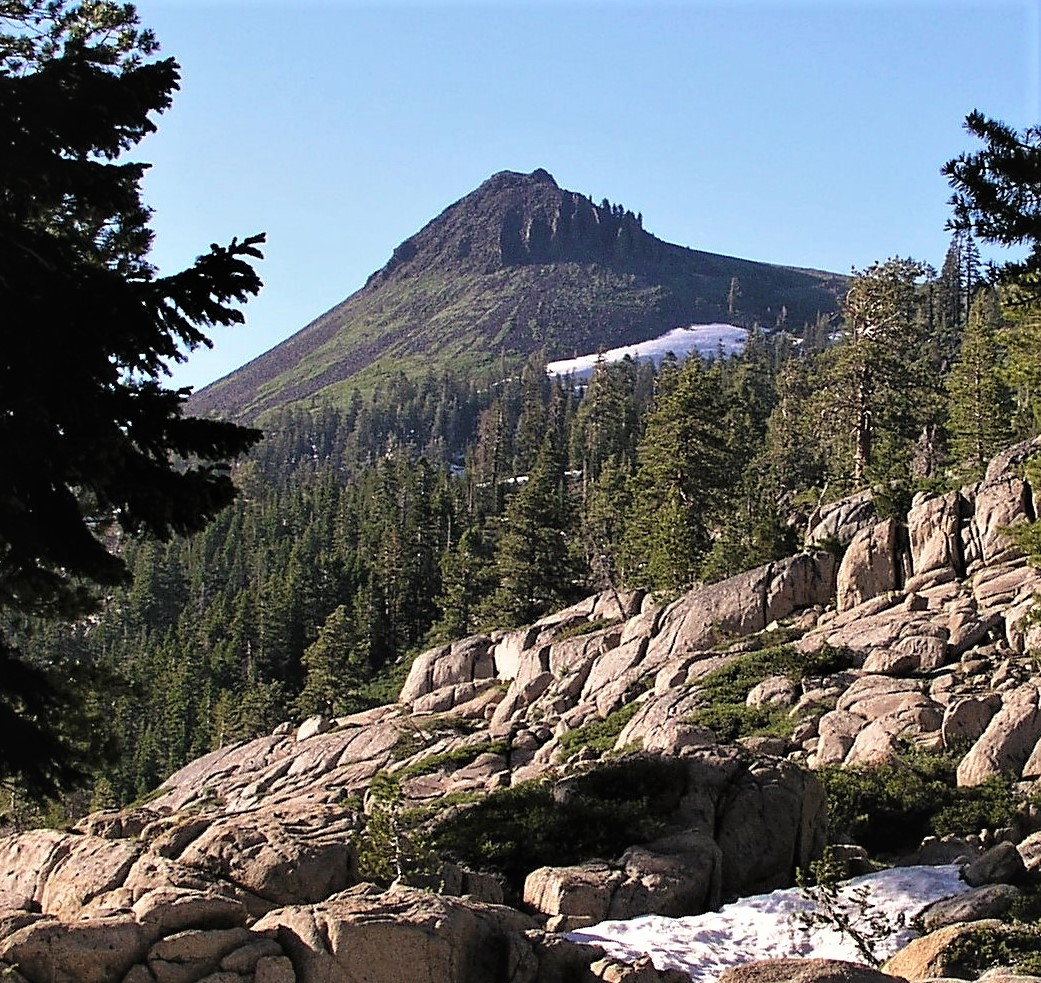
Tinker Knob, south aspect

== Climate ==
According to the Köppen climate classification system, Tinker Knob is located in an alpine climate zone. Most weather fronts originate in the Pacific Ocean and travel east toward the Sierra Nevada mountains. As fronts approach, they are forced upward by the peaks (orographic lift), causing them to drop their moisture in the form of rain or snowfall onto the range.
