= Mount Lincoln (California) =

Mountain in the state of California

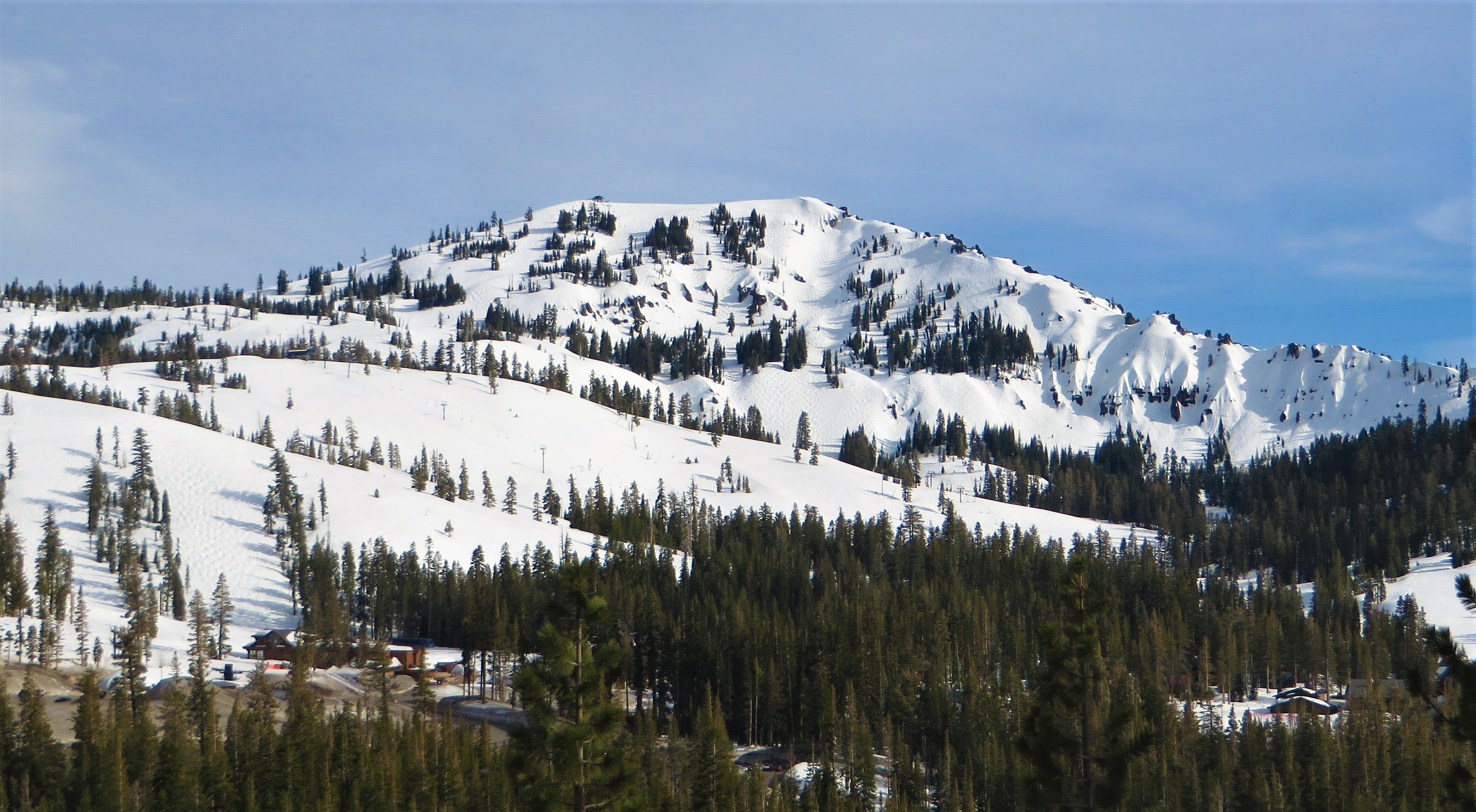
- North aspect

Highest point
- Elevation: 8,383 ft (2,555 m)
- Prominence: 623 ft (190 m)
- Parent peak: Tinker Knob (8,949 ft)
- Isolation: 3.77 mi (6.07 km)
- Coordinates: 39°17′16″N 120°19′42″W

Naming
- Etymology: Abraham Lincoln

Geography
- Location within California Location within the United States
- Location: Donner Pass
- Country: United States of America
- State: California
- County: Placer
- Parent range: Sierra Nevada
- Topo map: USGS Norden

Climbing
- Easiest route: class 1 hiking

Mount Lincoln is an 8,383-foot-elevation (2,555-meter) mountain summit in Placer County, California, United States.

== Description ==
Mount Lincoln is located two miles south of Donner Pass at Sugar Bowl Ski Resort, on land managed by Tahoe National Forest. It is situated on the crest of the Sierra Nevada mountain range, with precipitation runoff from the peak draining to South Yuba River, North Fork American River, and Truckee River. Topographic relief is modest as the summit rises 2,200 feet (670 meters) above Onion Creek in 1.75 mile. Neighbors include Mount Disney, 0.8 miles (1.3 km) to the northwest, Mount Judah one mile (1.6 km) to the northeast, and the nearest higher peak is Anderson Peak, 2.5 miles (4.0 km) to the southeast. The Pacific Crest Trail traverses the east slope of the peak, providing an approach option from Donner Pass.

== History ==
The California Trail, which crossed Roller Pass between Mount Lincoln and Mount Judah, was one of the wagon trails through Donner Pass used by pioneers on the way to Sutter's Fort. In the spring of 1846, 90 people departed Springfield, Illinois, en route to California. The ill-fated journey of the Donner Party tragically ended near here when they were snowbound at Donner Lake before they could cross this pass. Coincidently, Abraham Lincoln was from Springfield. He was a friend of, and lawyer to, James F. Reed who was a member of the Donner Party. Lincoln was interested in California and joining the Donner Party, but decided not to go because of his wife, toddler son, and new political career as a congressman.

As president, Abe Lincoln supported a transcontinental railroad to Northern California, and in 1862 signed the Pacific Railroad Acts to begin construction. The Sierra Nevada posed a big obstacle to the project, and Theodore Judah decided a route for the railroad was best through Donner Pass as it required only one summit crossing rather than the two of other possible options. The Lincoln Highway which crosses Donner Pass was dedicated in 1913 and was the first cross-country road for automobiles, as well as America's first national memorial to President Lincoln. It turned out that Abe Lincoln never set foot in California.

In 1924, Charlie Chaplin filmed scenes on Mount Lincoln for his silent movie classic, The Gold Rush.

In 1957, a ski chair lift was installed on the peak.

This landform's toponym has appeared in publications since at least 1872, and has been officially adopted by the U.S. Board on Geographic Names.

== Climate ==
According to the Köppen climate classification system, Mount Lincoln is located in an alpine climate zone. Most weather fronts originate in the Pacific Ocean and travel east toward the Sierra Nevada mountains. As fronts approach, they are forced upward by the peaks (orographic lift), causing them to drop their moisture in the form of rain or snowfall onto the range. Donner Pass averages 51.6 inches (1,310 mm) of precipitation per year, and with an average of 411.5 inches (10.45 m) of snow per year, it is one of the snowiest places in the contiguous United States. There are five ski areas at Donner Pass.

== Gallery ==
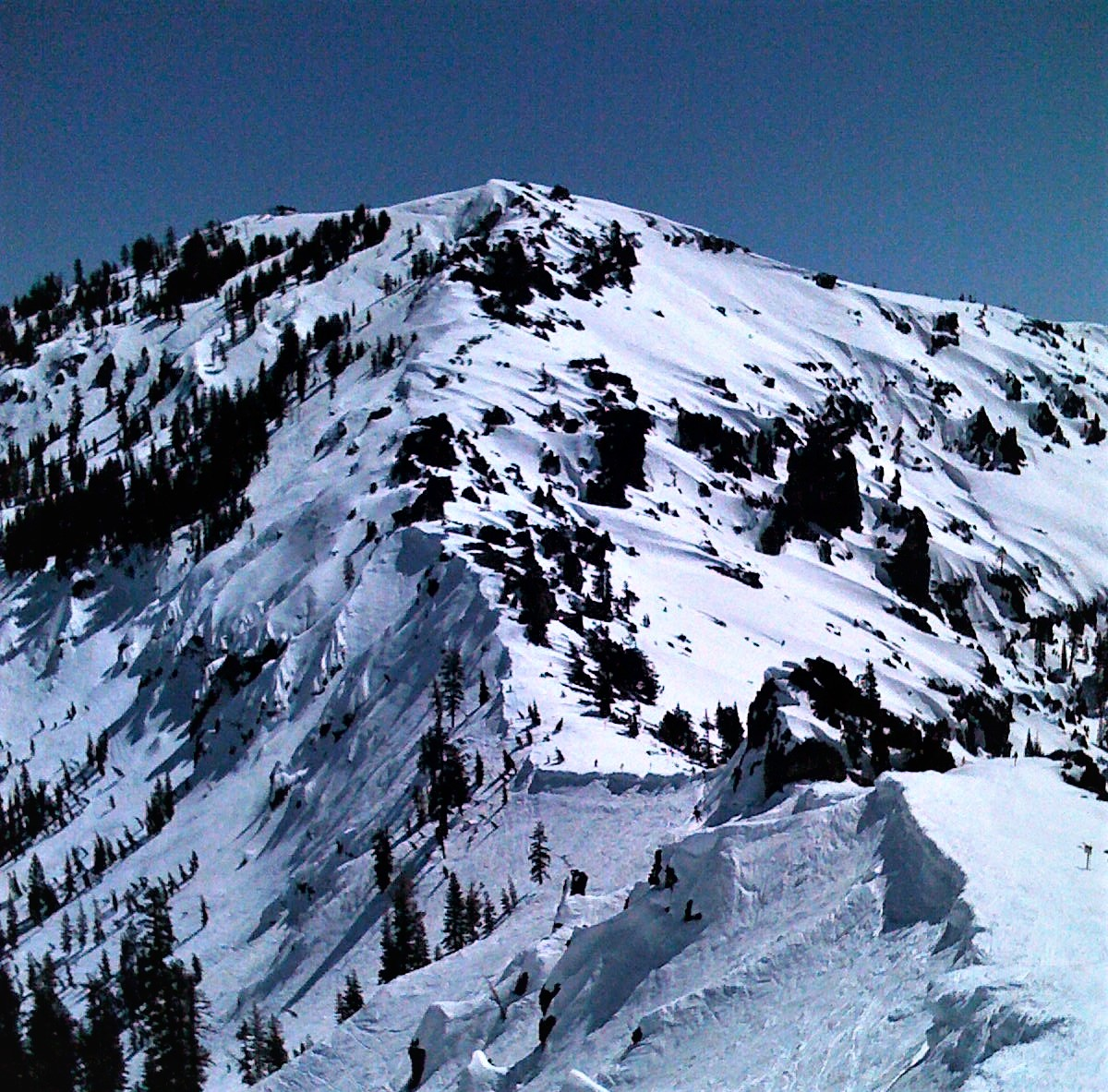
Northwest aspect of Mount Lincoln seen from Mount Disney.

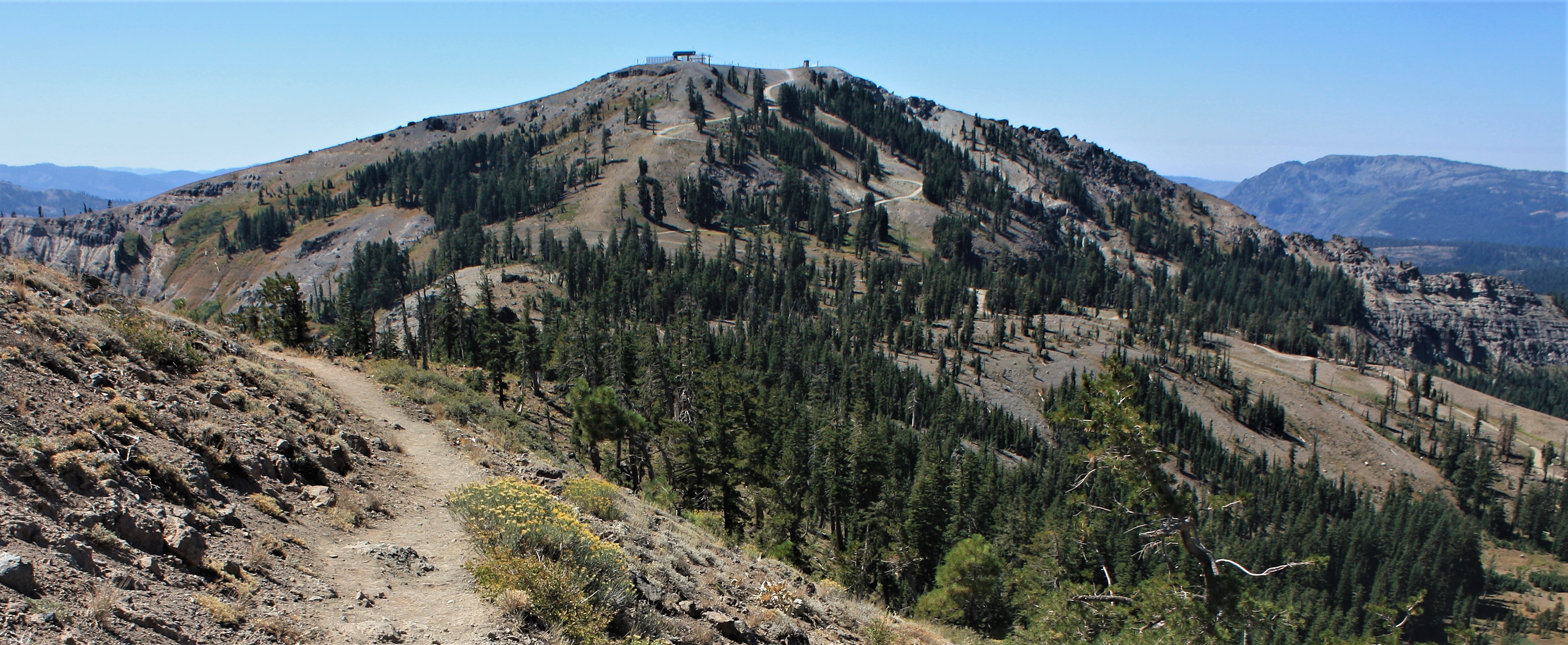
Northeast aspect of Mount Lincoln seen from Mt. Judah Loop Trail.

== See also ==
- Sugar Bowl Ski Resort
- Mount Lincoln
