= Mount Lincoln =

Mount Lincoln may refer to one of various mountains located in the United States:

Name	USGS link	State	County	USGS map	Coordinates	Elevation	
Mount Lincoln		California	Placer	Norden	39°17′16″N 120°19′41″W	8,369 ft	2,551 m
Mount Lincoln		Colorado	Mesa	Cameo	39°08′09″N 108°21′09″W	6,630 ft	2,020 m
Mount Lincoln		Colorado	Park	Alma	39°21′05″N 106°06′41″W	14,265 ft	4,348 m
Mount Lincoln		Massachusetts	Hampshire	Belchertown	42°21′50″N 072°25′23″W	1,230 ft	370 m
Mount Lincoln		Nevada	Churchill	Table Mountain	39°32′58″N 118°15′47″W	8,566 ft	2,611 m
Mount Lincoln		New Hampshire	Grafton	Franconia	44°08′56″N 071°38′40″W	5,085 ft	1,550 m
Mount Lincoln		Oklahoma	Comanche	Quanah Mountain	34°42′45″N 098°43′17″W	2,205 ft	672 m
Mount Lincoln		Washington	Mason	Mount Skokomish	47°33′00″N 123°19′42″W	5,764 ft	1,757 m
