= Granite Chief Wilderness =

Protected wilderness area in California, United States

- IUCN category Ib (wilderness area)
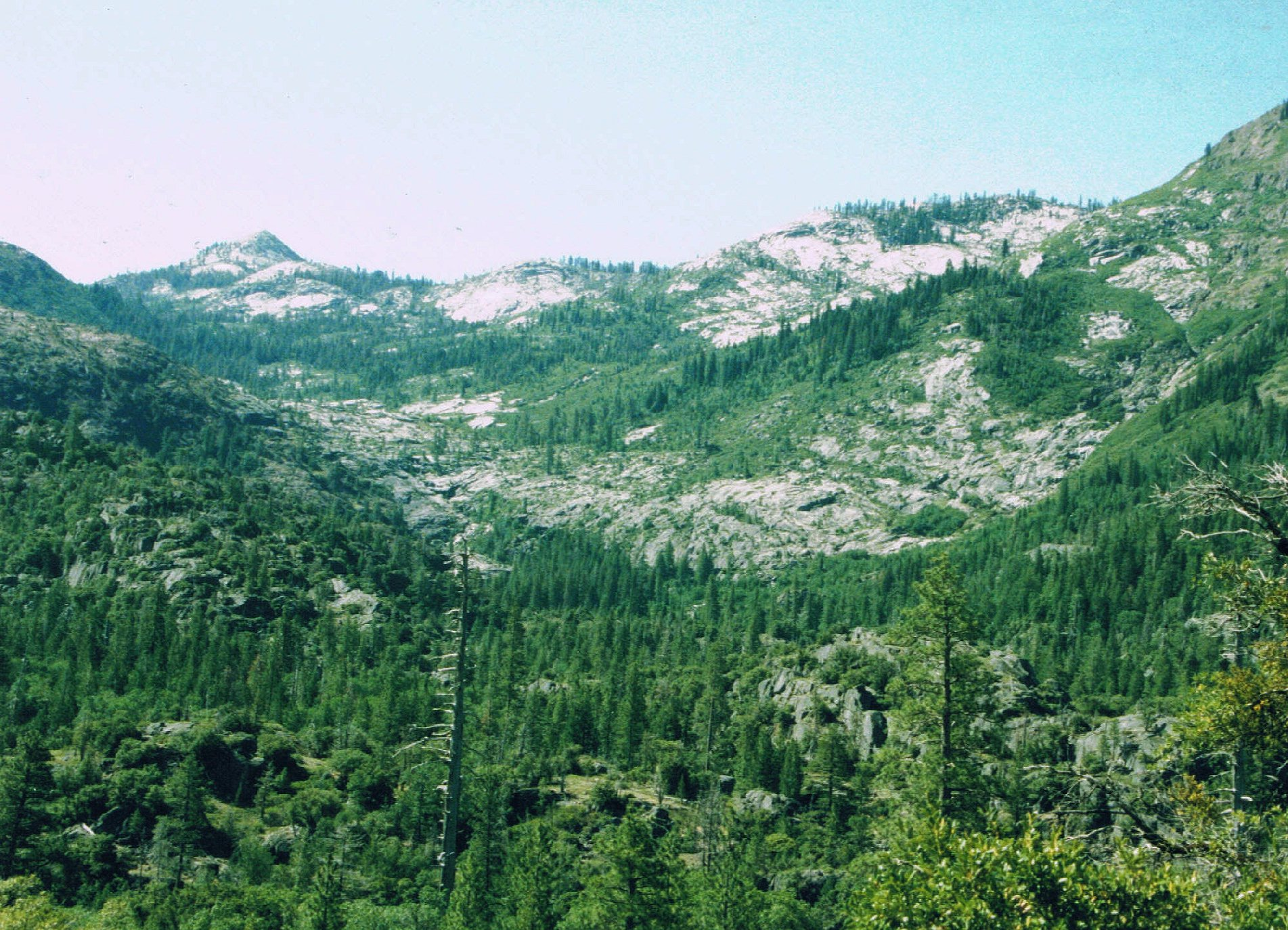

- Location within California Location within the United States
- Interactive map of Granite Chief Wilderness
- Location: Placer County, California, United States
- Nearest city: Tahoe City, California
- Coordinates: 39°08′58″N 120°17′45″W
- Area: 19,048 acres (77.08 km^{2})
- Established: January 1, 1984
- Governing body: U.S. Forest Service

The Granite Chief Wilderness is a 19,048 acre (77 km^{2}) federally designated wilderness area of the Tahoe National Forest. Created by the California Wilderness Act of 1984, it is located in the Sierra Nevada mountains west of Lake Tahoe in the U.S. state of California. It is managed by the U.S. Forest Service Tahoe National Forest. Elevations range from 4,800 feet (1,500 m) to 9,019 feet (2,749 m) at the summit of Granite Chief.

Events such as the Western States Endurance Run and the equestrian Western States Trail Ride, (popularly called The Tevis Cup) cross portions of the wilderness. The Pacific Crest Trail also passes through along the east edge of the wilderness.

This region is extensively glaciated and has features such as hanging valleys, cirques and U-shaped valleys, but few lakes. Just outside the wilderness boundary there are two large recreation reservoirs, Hell Hole Reservoir to the south and French Meadows Reservoir to the west.

The Sierra Club had maintained the Bradley Hut, which was a ski hut located at the Five Lakes Basin, but in 1994 the Sierra Club was asked to remove the hut by the Forest Service as it was now inside the newly created wilderness. The hut was dismantled and relocated four miles (6 km) away. Because no mechanical equipment can be used in a wilderness, the dismantling of the Bradley Hut took until the fall of 1996 to finish.

== Lakes and waterways ==
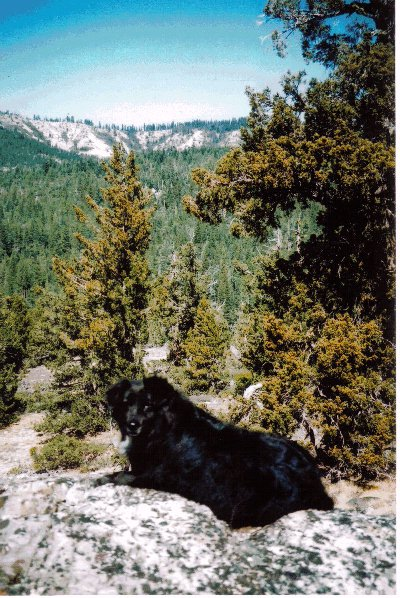
Picayune Valley, Granite Chief Wilderness California USA

The principal drainages are the Middle Fork of the American River and Five Lakes Creek. The small lakes within the wilderness boundary are the Five Lakes, Mildred Lake and Little Needle Lake.

Fish such as rainbow, brook and brown trout can be seen in Whiskey, Picayune, and Bear Pen creeks as well as the largest lake of the Five Lakes group.

== Flora and fauna ==
Rich, volcanic soils support a range of plant life, from fields of mule ears to conifer forests including whitebark pine at the highest elevations. Along the creeks grow black cottonwood, alder and aspen.

=== Rare plants ===
The three bracted onion (Allium tribracteatum) is a native perennial bulb endemic to California. The California Native Plant Society lists the three bracted onion as " rare, threatened, or endangered ... " and there are only 10 counties with either specimens obtained or a verified observation made. Near the North Forth American River is Whitney's milk vetch (Astragalus whitneyi var. lenophyllus).

Typical of the high Sierra Nevada Mountains, the wildlife includes mountain lions, black bears, and mule deer.

The Granite Chief Wilderness provides important fawning areas for mule deer, so visitors are prohibited from bringing dogs into certain areas of the wilderness from May 15 to July 15.

== Recreation ==
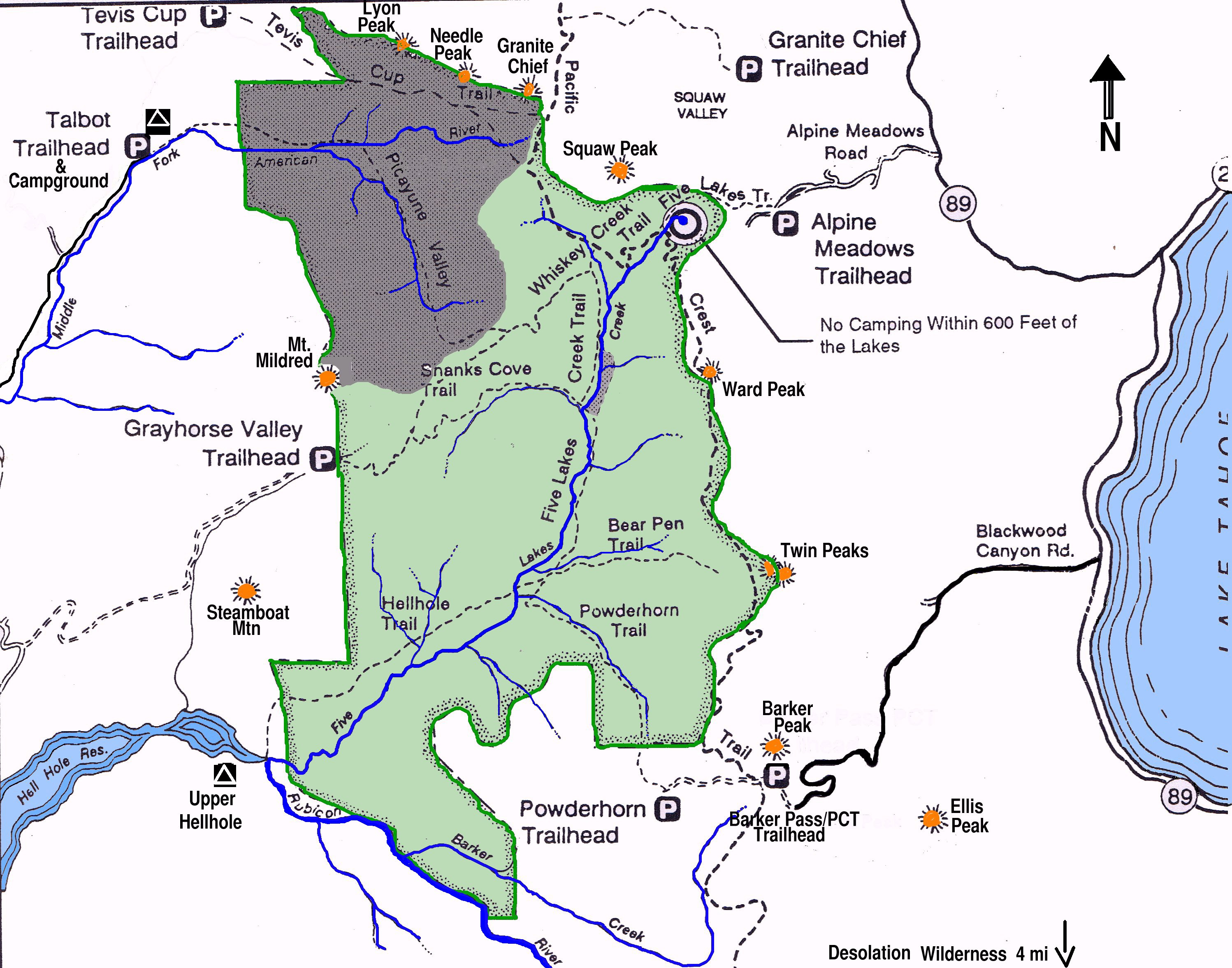
Map showing restricted deer fawning areas in gray

Activities include day-hiking, backpacking, fishing, cross-country skiing, mountain climbing and horsepacking. The Five Lakes basin is the most heavily used area in the wilderness due to the close proximity to both Palisades Tahoe and Alpine Meadows ski areas. Two commercial outfitters offer horsepacking trips into the wilderness.

=== Trails ===
There are 37 miles (60 km) of trails with eight trailheads. The most used is the Granite Chief trailhead located at Squaw Valley Ski Area parking lot. Talbot campground is located near the Talbot trailhead, four miles (6 km) north of French Meadows Reservoir and is the only trailhead with a no-fee campground.

=== Notable peaks ===
Peaks in Granite Chief Wilderness
Name	Elevation	Latitude	Longitude
Granite Chief	9,006 feet (2,745 m)	39.198° N	120.285° W
Needle Peak	8,971 feet (2,734 m)	39.200° N	120.299° W
Lyon Peak	8,899 feet (2,712 m)	39.207° N	120.315° W
Squaw Peak	8,876 feet (2,705 m)	39.181° N	120.270° W
Twin Peaks	8,859 feet (2,700 m)	39.112° N	120.232° W
Ward Peak	8,600 feet (2,600 m)	39.148° N	120.245° W
Mount Mildred	8,367 feet (2,550 m)	39.146° N	120.330° W

== See also ==
- Tahoe National Forest
