= Schroeder Mountain =

Mountain in California, United States

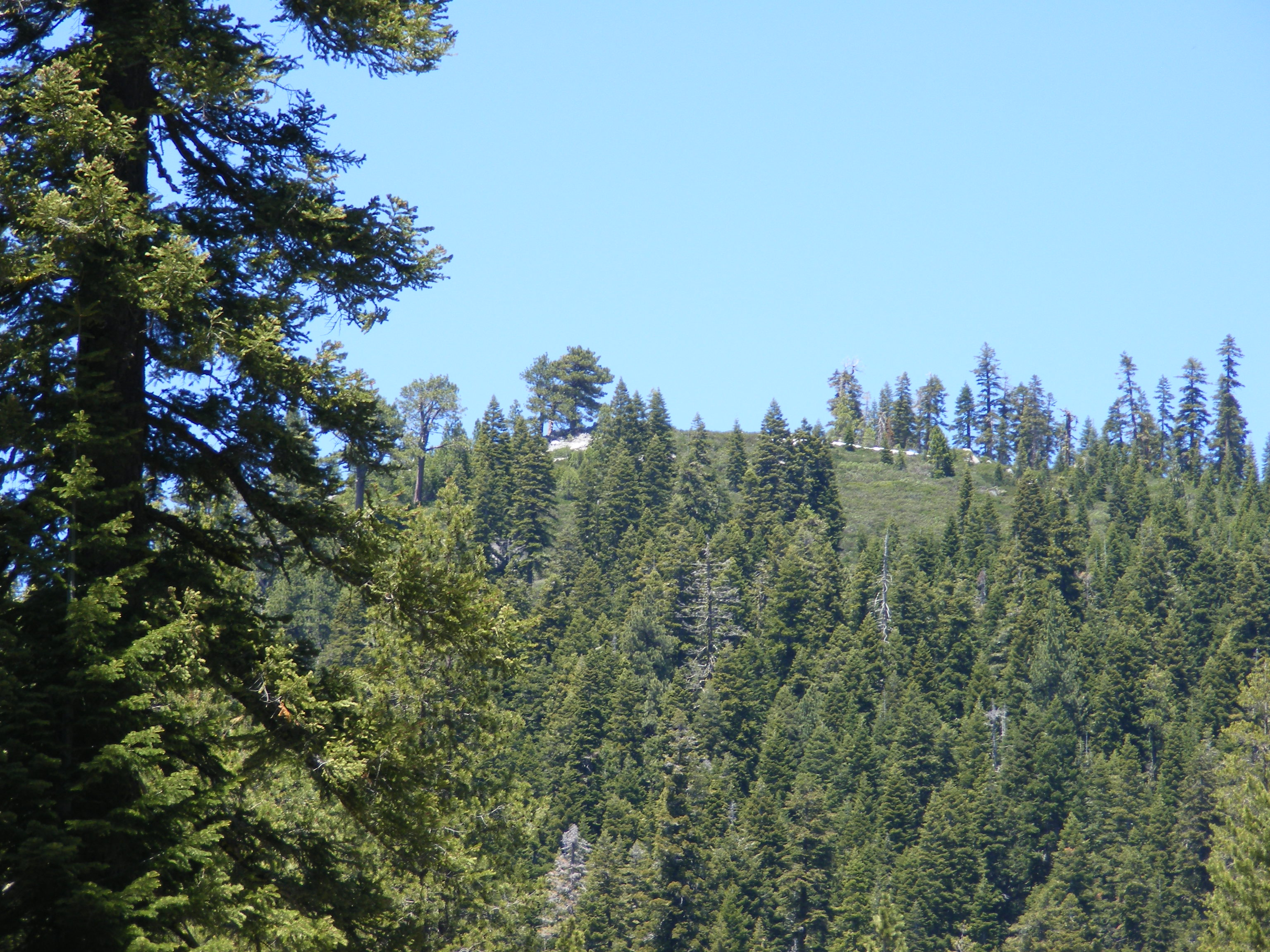
- Schroeder Mountain seen from California State Route 49.

Highest point
- Elevation: 6,942 ft (2,116 m)
- Coordinates: 39°37′39″N 120°31′45″W

Geography
- Location within California Location within the United States
- Location: Tahoe National Forest, Sierra County, California.
- Parent range: Sierra Nevada

Schroeder Mountain is a mountain in the California's Sierra Nevada, on the Tahoe National Forest. It is located 0.8 miles (1 km) east of California State Route 49 in Sierra County. Its elevation is 6,942 feet (2,116 m).

It is 2.5 miles (4.0 km) west-northwest of Yuba Pass, 1.5 miles (2.4 km) southwest of Beartrap Meadow; approx. 30 miles (48 km) northeast of Downieville. Clark Station Summer Home Tract is at the base of the mountain. It is also known by some local cabin owners as Fuzz Top due to the "fuzzy" way the vegetation appears from far away. This name has been in use since at least the 1960s.

It is a very steep and difficult climb to the top without a trail. Despite this, many cabin owners have been to Fuzz Top's summit numerous times.

== Namesake history ==
Schroeder Mountain is named for John Schroeder (1822–1906), a pioneer, miner, rancher, and teamster. After migrating from Indiana to California following the Gold Rush in 1852, Schroeder bought and sold land in Yuba and Siskiyou Counties, before settling in Sierra County in 1855. The following year he settled on a ranch located several miles west of Loyalton, and 16 miles (26 km) east-northeast of this summit.

Schroeder was born August 18, 1822, in Rush County, Indiana, the sixth child of Peter and Nancy Schroeder. During the gold rush in 1852, John Schroeder came to California with his brother and nephew. In the 1852 Special State Census John lists his occupation as a miner. Family history claims John was a successful miner and professional gambler. According to the relatives remaining in Indiana, John was the black sheep of the family. It is not known exactly where his initial search for gold took him. Although it is known that he purchased/sold property in Yuba County in 1854 and Siskiyou County in 1855 before arriving in Sierra County. John was one of three pioneers who located quarter sections of land in 1859 at Smith Neck, which is now known as Loyalton.

On April 11, 1856, he married Wealthy Ann Katen in Yreka City, Siskiyou County and then moved to Marysville after their first child was born. From there, they went east over the Yuba Pass to Sierra Valley in Sierra County. Again, according to family history, Wealthy Ann made the journey riding a mule and carrying the baby in her arms. The family settled on a ranch several miles west of Loyalton, property later homesteaded by John. The rest of their ten children were born at this location.

In the 1860, 1870 and 1880 censuses, John listed himself as a farmer. In the Great Register of 1892, he describes himself as a teamster. His obituary describes him as a rancher and indicates that he was extensively engaged in raising stock in the Loyalton area. At one time, he ran a freight line from Marysville to Virginia City presumably what is now Highway 49. Throughout these activities, he continued to try his hand at mining.

John died in Loyalton on July 11, 1906, not quite 84 years old and is buried in the local cemetery. The cause of his death was asthenia with old age as a contributing factor. According to his obituary, "Mr. Schroeder was a typical westerner, a hardy pioneer and came of good stock."

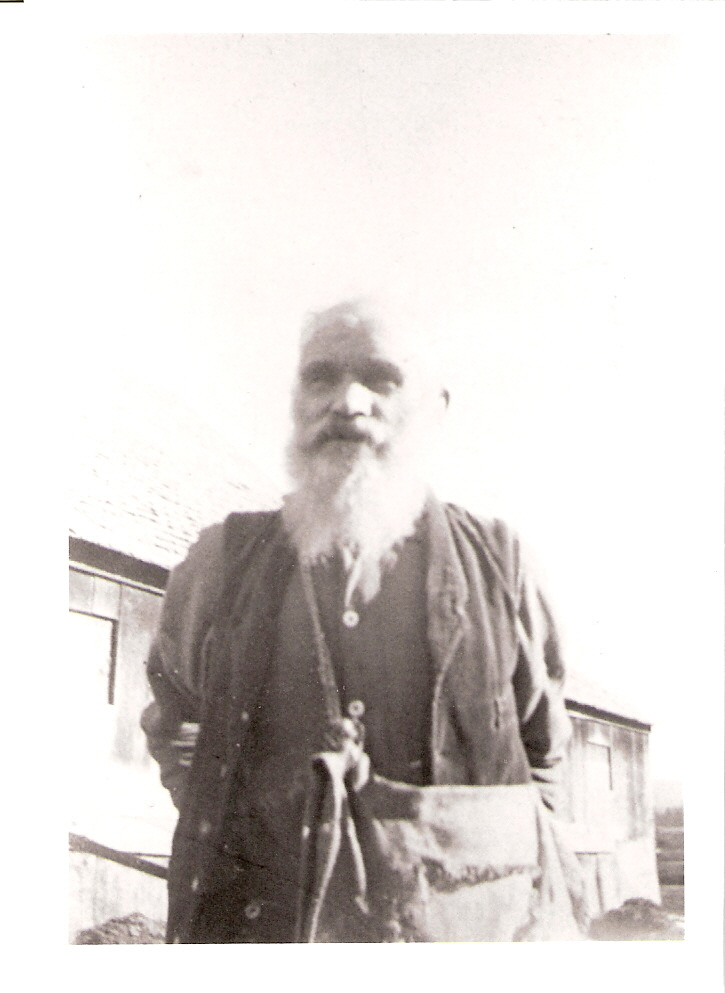
John Schroeder (1822-1906)

== Notes ==
=== References ===
1. Plath, Beryl. Granddaughter of John Schroeder – Family Records
2. Schleef, Edith. Granddaughter of John Schroeder – Family Records
3. Schroeder-Gorman, Lorraine. Great granddaughter of John Schroeder - Family Records
4. Thomas, Lynda. Granddaughter of John’s brother Robert – Family Records
