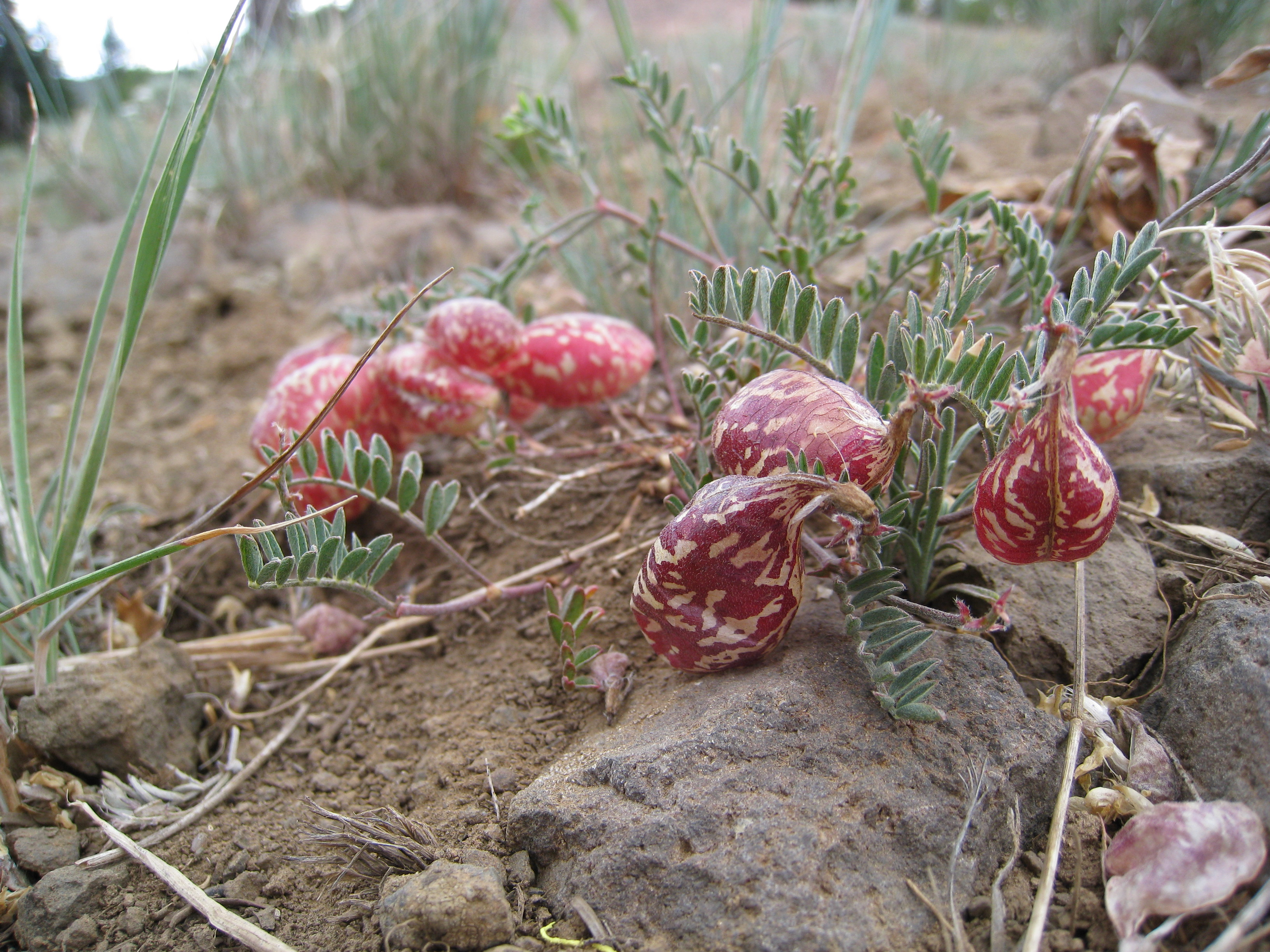

Scientific classification
- Kingdom: Plantae
- Clade: Tracheophytes
- Clade: Angiosperms
- Clade: Eudicots
- Clade: Rosids
- Order: Fabales
- Family: Fabaceae
- Subfamily: Faboideae
- Genus: Astragalus
- Species: A. whitneyi

Binomial name
- Astragalus whitneyi (Nutt.) A.Gray

= Astragalus whitneyi =

Species of legume

Astragalus whitneyi is a species of legume known by the common name balloon-pod milk-vetch, balloon milk-vetch, or Whitney's locoweed. It is a native to the Cascade Range and the Sierra Nevada (U.S.) and is unusual for its bright red or red-splotched balloon-like seedpods.

Varieties include:

- Astragalus whitneyi var. confusus
- Astragalus whitneyi var. siskiyouensis
- Astragalus whitneyi var. whitneyi

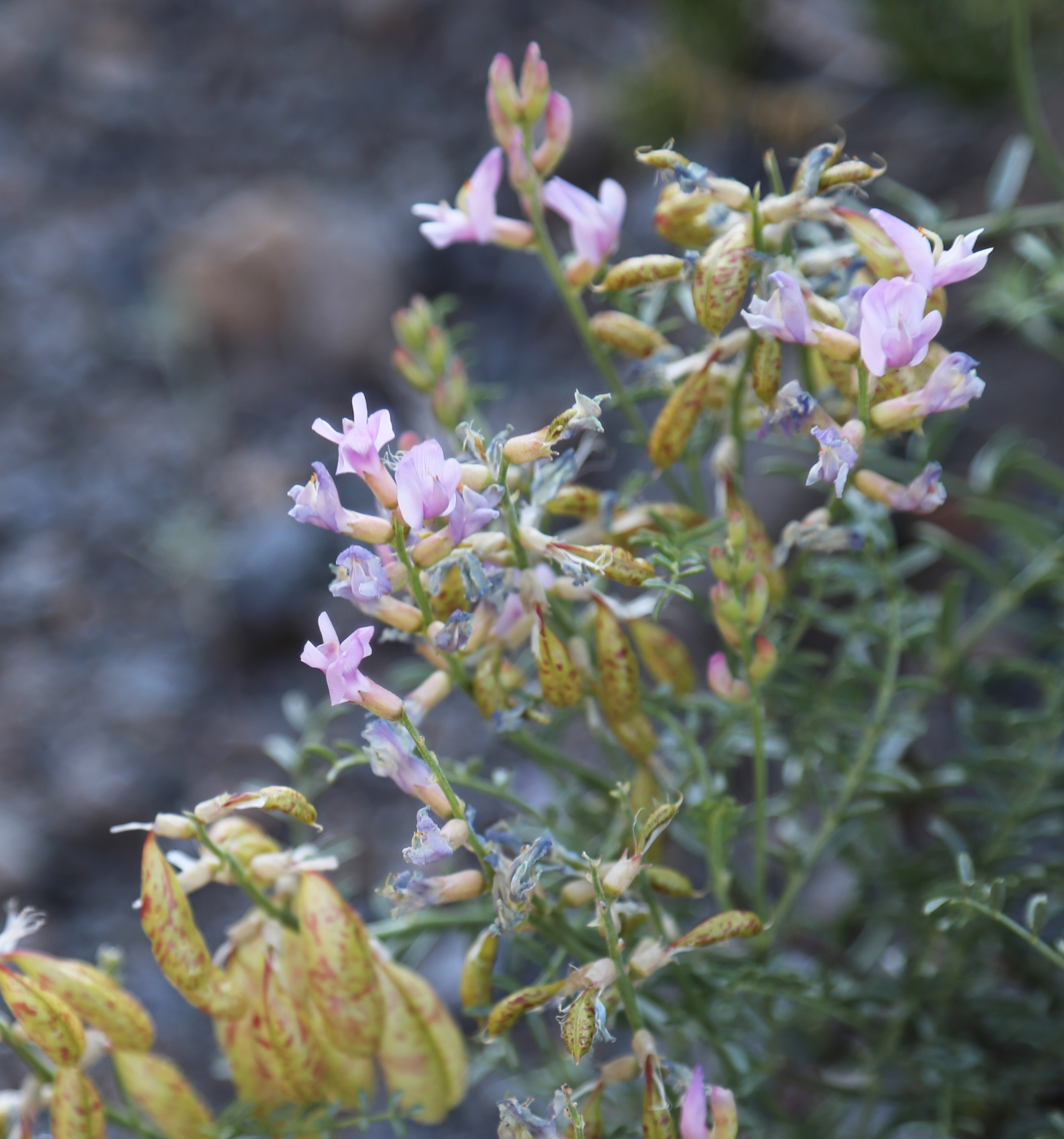
Astragalus whitneyi flowers and seedpods
