= Granite Chief =

Mountain in the American state of California

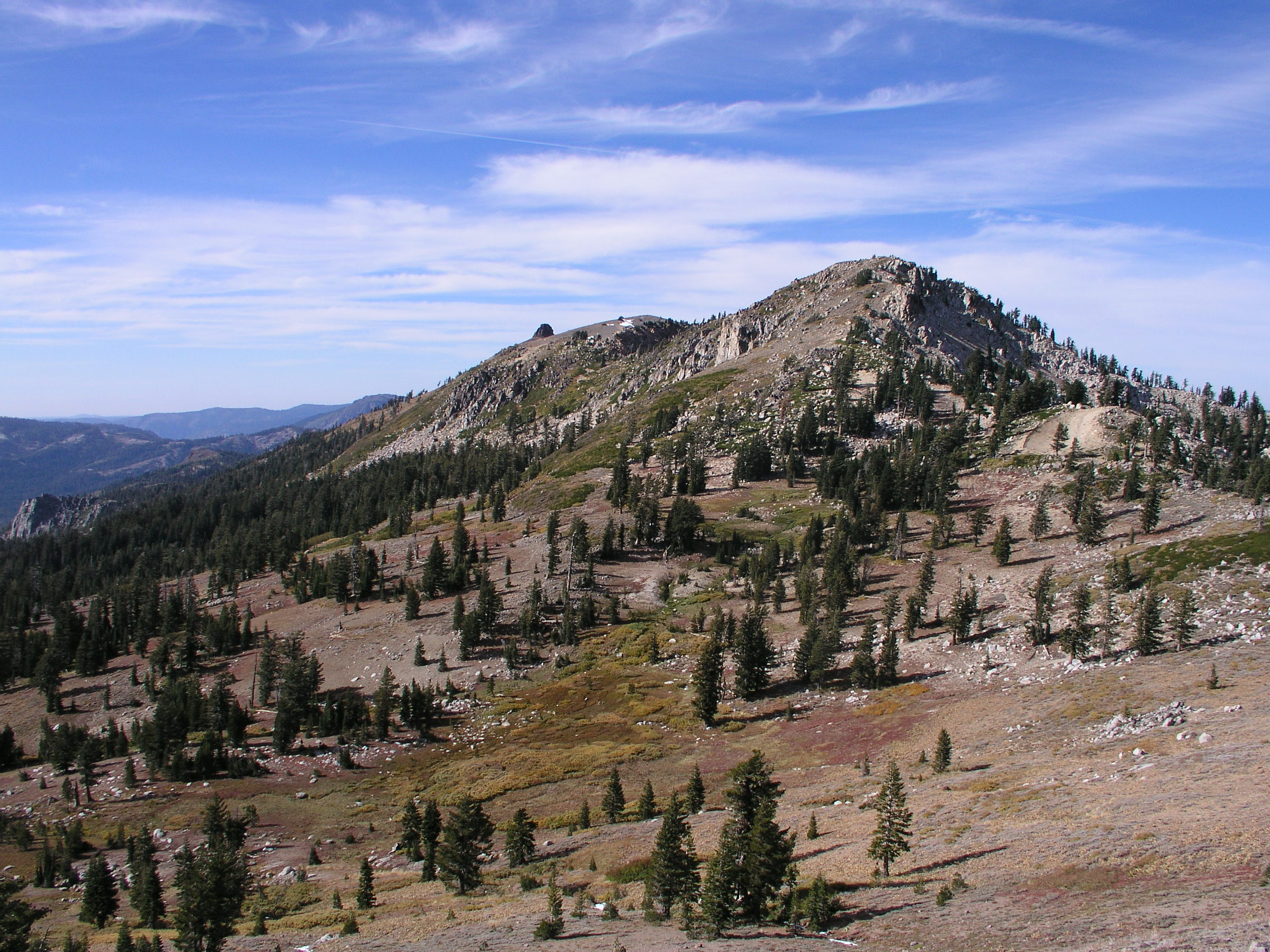
- Granite Chief in the summer

Highest point
- Elevation: 9,010 ft (2,746 m) NAVD 88
- Prominence: 1,846 ft (563 m)
- Listing: Sierra Peaks Section
- Coordinates: 39°11′54″N 120°17′13″W

Geography
- Location within California
- Location: Placer County, California, U.S.
- Parent range: Sierra Nevada
- Topo map: USGS Granite Chief

Granite Chief is a mountain located in the Sierra Nevada near Lake Tahoe. The mountain rises to an elevation of 9,010 feet (2,746 m) and receives consistent heavy snowfall during the winter months.

The summit is the highest point in the Granite Chief Wilderness and marks the northwestern boundary of Palisades Tahoe.
