= Tahoe National Forest =

U.S. National Forest in California

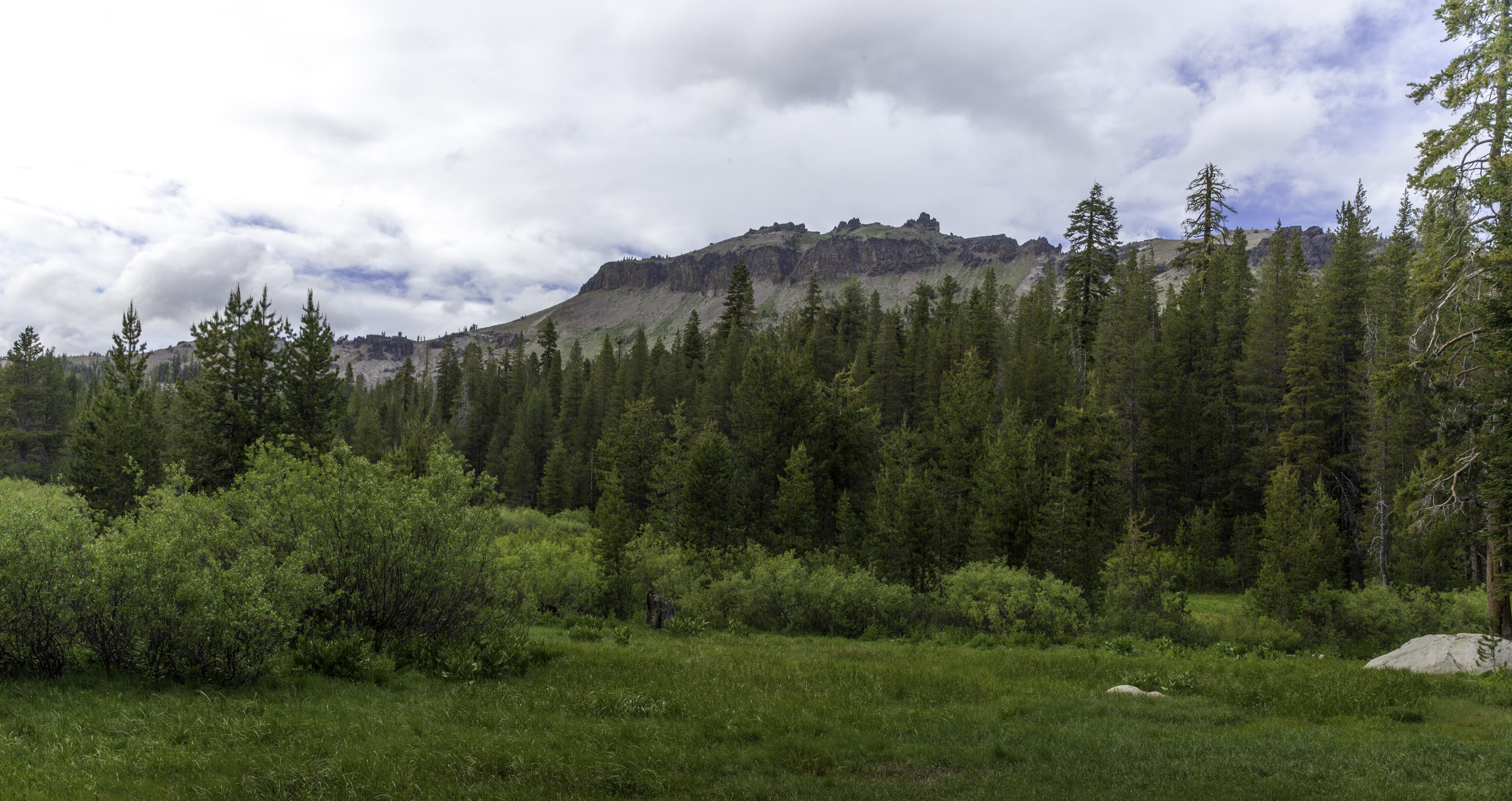
- Castle Valley near Lake Tahoe
- Interactive map of Tahoe National Forest
- Location: Northwest of Lake Tahoe, California, U.S.
- Nearest city: Truckee, California
- Coordinates: 39°33′45″N 120°33′45″W
- Area: 871,495 acres (3,526.82 km^{2})
- Established: 1905
- Governing body: U.S. Forest Service
- Website: www.fs.usda.gov/tahoe

Tahoe National Forest is a United States National Forest located in California, northwest of Lake Tahoe. It includes the 8,587-foot (2,617 m) peak of Sierra Buttes, near Sierra City, which has views of Mount Lassen and Mount Shasta. It is located in parts of six counties: Sierra, Placer, Nevada, Yuba, Plumas and El Dorado. The forest has a total area of 871,495 acres (1,362 sq mi; 3,527 km^{2}). Its headquarters is in Nevada City, California. There are local ranger district offices in Camptonville, Foresthill, Sierraville and Truckee.

Tahoe National Forest has many natural and man-made resources for the enjoyment of its visitors, including hundreds of lakes and reservoirs (most notably Boca Reservoir), river canyons carving through granite bedrock, and many miles of trails including a portion of the Pacific Crest Trail. The National Wilderness Preservation System's Granite Chief Wilderness is close by to Tahoe City, where many trails branch out into the Wilderness.

The forest also serves as the water supply headwaters for the towns of Lincoln, Auburn and Rocklin. Reno, Nevada and Sparks, Nevada also receive their water from the Truckee River which runs through both cities on its way to its terminus at Pyramid Lake. It is also home to three wolverines.

== Overview ==
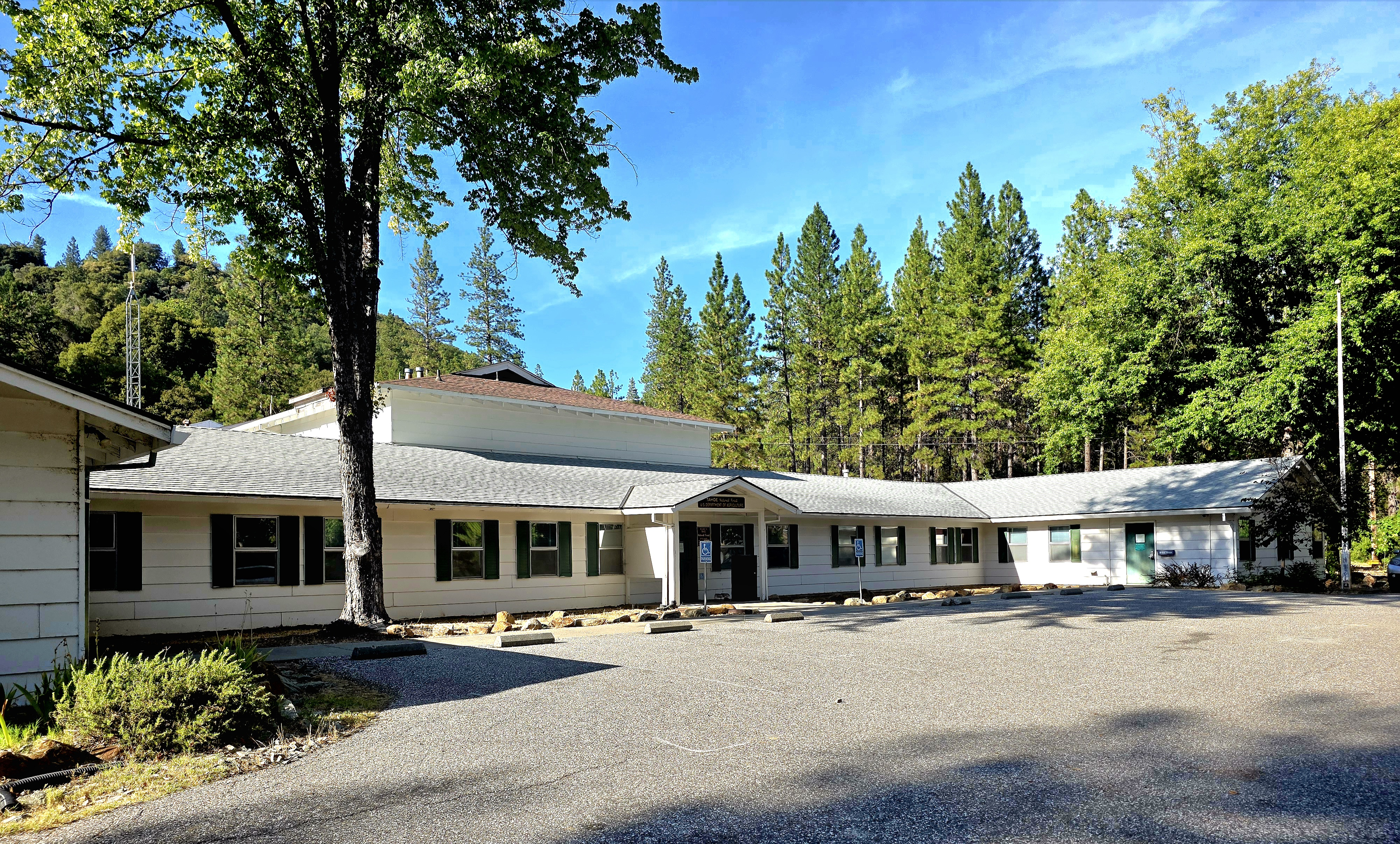
Tahoe National Forest headquarters in Nevada City, California

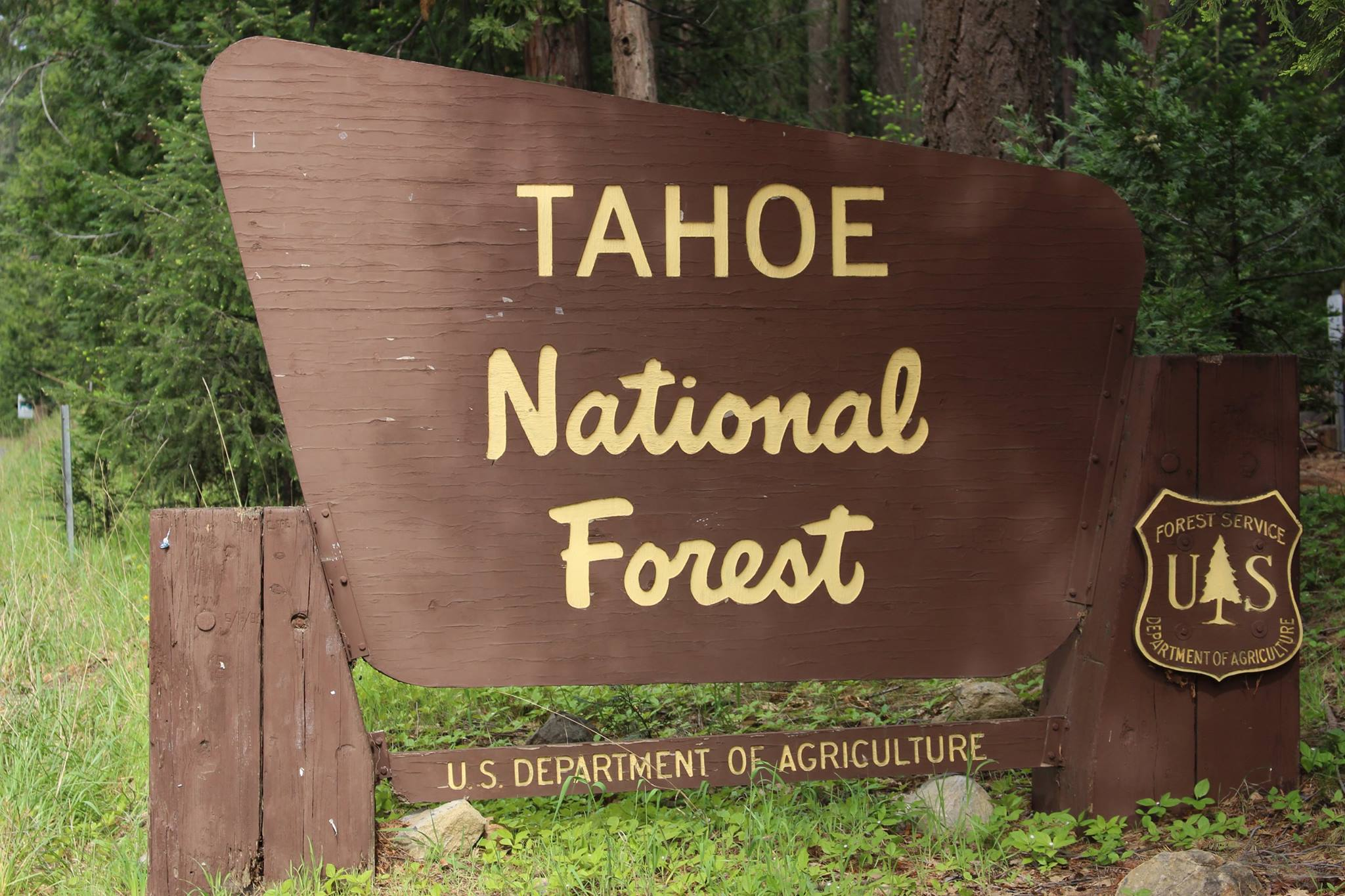
Entrance sign

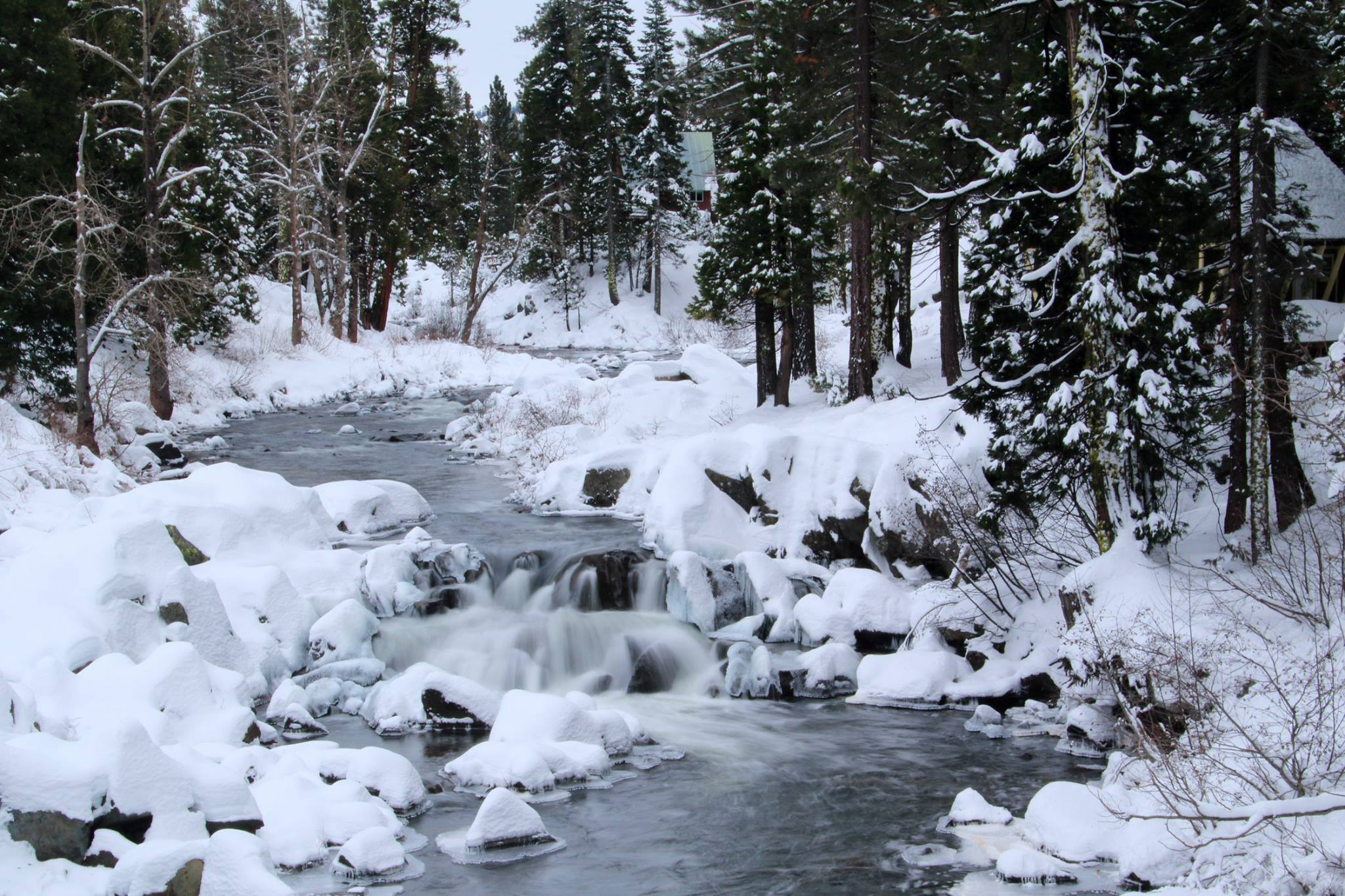
Winter season

Tracked from as far as 2 thousand years ago, the Washoe tribe were the native indigenous who located in Tahoe National Forest. The Washoe used Lake Tahoe as a main source for food and hunting focusing on fishing and milling sites. Their camps were made along lush meadows and streams that parted from the lake. Here they lived peacefully and undisturbed until the Gold Rush in 1849 when people from all over the world traveled to California. The Washoe's territory was encroached upon and their governance was taken away by miners.

The Forest Reserves were established in 1893 under the General Revision Act, also known as the Forest Reserve Act of 1891, with the mission of halting uncontrolled exploitation of its resources. In California, the Sierra Forest Reserve which included the Tahoe Forest consisted of over 4,000,000 acres (1,600,000 ha) was established on February 14, 1893. The Lake Tahoe Forest Reserve was established in 1899 by President William McKinley and later renamed Tahoe Forest Reserve on April 13, 1899 on October 3, 1905.

President Theodore Roosevelt supported the transfer of forest reserves from the U.S. Department of the Interior to the Department of Agriculture's Forest Service in 1905, with Gifford Pinchot as Chief Forester. Thus began the United States National Forest System. In 1908, the Sierra National Forest was divided into five units and as time went on, more divisions, additions, and combinations were worked out so that presently, Tahoe is one of eight national forests along the Sierra Nevada Mountain Range. They are, from north to south, Plumas, Tahoe, Eldorado, Toiyabe, Stanislaus, Inyo, Sierra, and Sequoia.

The charter given by James Wilson, U.S. Secretary of Agriculture, states: The National Forests are for the purpose of preserving a perpetual supply of timber for home industries, preventing a destruction of forest cover which regulates the flow of streams, and protecting local residents from unfair competition in the use of forest and range. The timber, water, pasture and mineral resources of the national forests are for the use of the people.

=== Access ===
Nearly all of the forest is publicly accessible under normal circumstances, subject to temporary closures for fire or weather reasons. There are many miles of roads and trails, most of which are regularly maintained. Being fairly close to both the Sacramento and Reno metropolitan areas, the forest is somewhat less remote than other national forests in the Sierra Nevada, and sees more use even in its deepest reaches. Two major roads, Foresthill Road and Mosquito Ridge Road are accessible to regular vehicles, which means many visitors can easily access areas that would be considered far flung in other nearby national forests.

=== Recreation ===
Tahoe National Forest is one of the most visited recreation forests in the U.S with over 6 million visitors per year. At the Tahoe National Forest there are 63 campgrounds. If visiting during the winter, a unique activity is getting a permit to cut a Christmas tree for personal use. In warmer months activities include hiking, fishing, biking. However, for those planning a trip to Tahoe National Park, the park has stated to check fire restrictions and closures beforehand.

=== Tahoe National Forest Fires ===
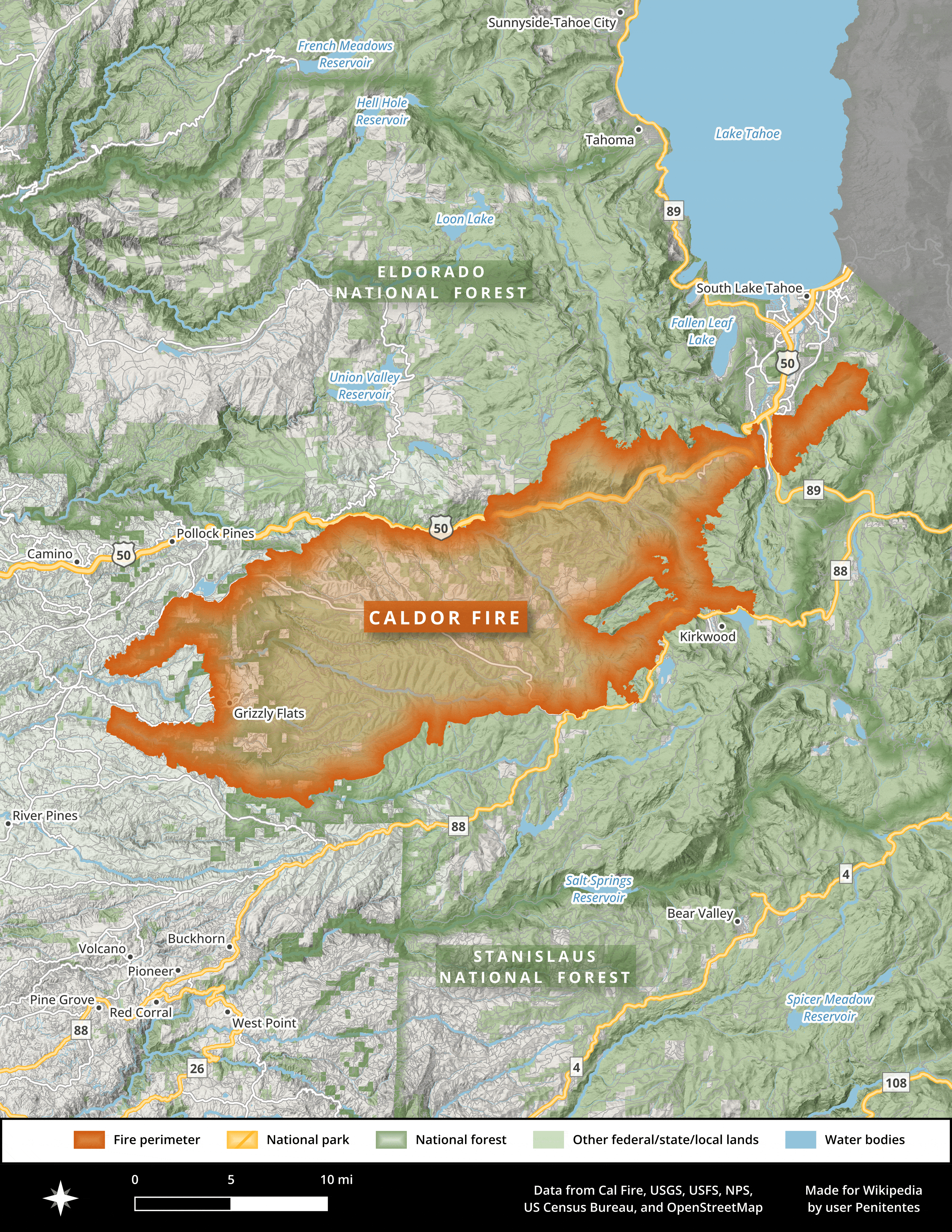
Caldor Fire Map

Similar to many other forests and lands throughout California, Tahoe national forest has had several devastating fires and has many restrictions and guidelines for visitors to follow in order to prevent spread of wildfires. Most recently Bear fire has burnt through 3,327 acres of Tahoe National Forest specifically in Sierra county. Bear fire, similar to most wildfires, was caused due to hot and dry windy conditions. However, one of the worst wildfires Tahoe National Forest has faced was the Caldor fire in 2021 that burned thousands of acres.

=== Ecology and Vegetation ===
Tahoe National Forest's elevation ranges from 1,500 ft in the American River canyon to over 9,000 ft on top of mt. Lola along the Sierra Crest. The vegetation zones include mountain chaparral, mixed conifer, red fir, and eastside sage-pine/brush. Over 290 animal species inhabit Tahoe national forest along with over 1,000 plant species. Some of the most prominent animals found in Tahoe national forest include Lahontan Cutthroat Trout, Sierra Red Fox, and the Mountain Beaver.

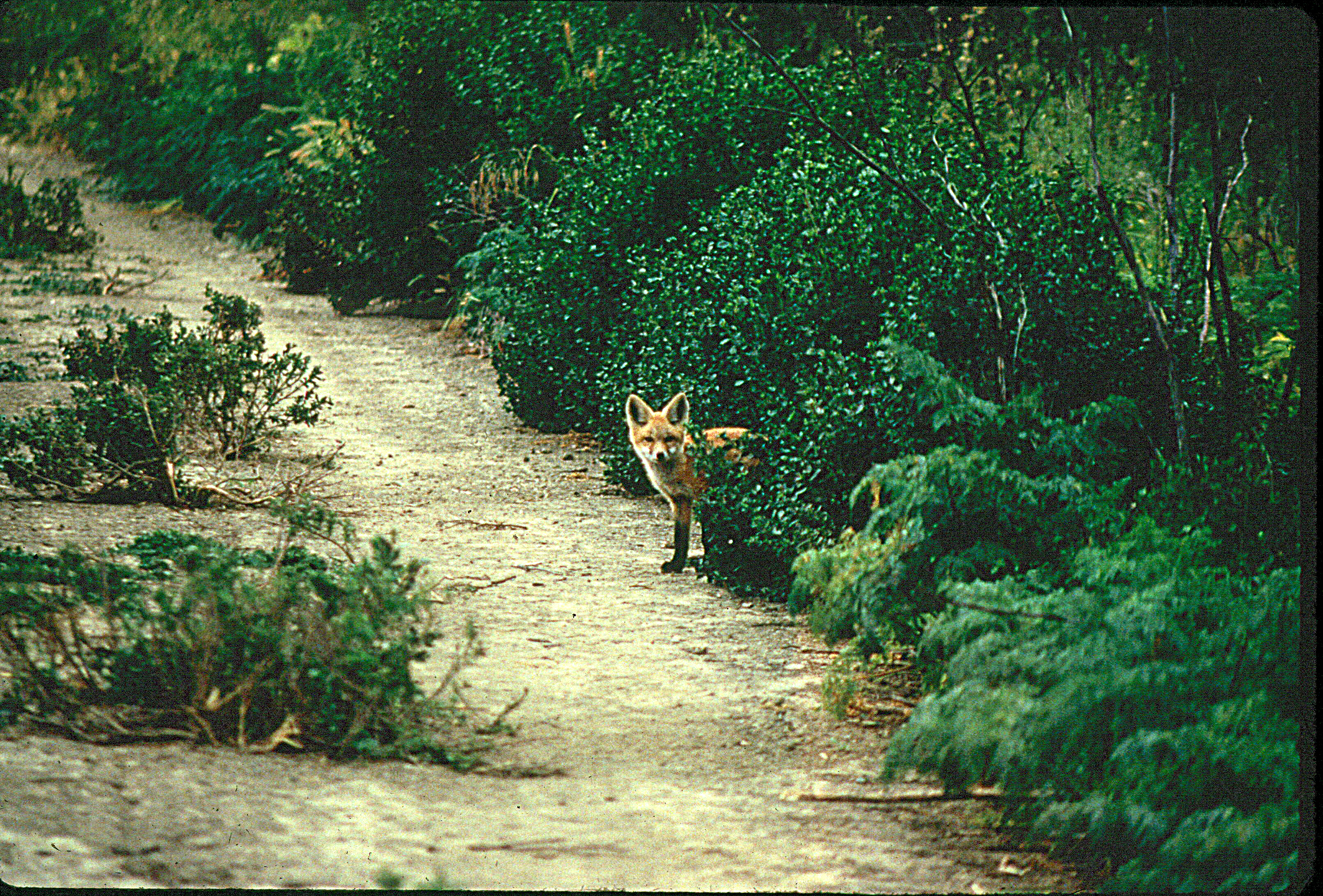
Sierra Red Fox

A 2002 report estimated nearly 84,000 acres (340 km^{2}) of old growth in the Forest. The old growth includes coast Douglas fir (Pseudotsuga menziesii var. menziesii), Ponderosa pine (Pinus ponderosa), white fir (Abies concolor), sugar pine (Pinus lambertiana), California incense cedar (Calocedrus decurrens), California black oak (Quercus kelloggii), lodgepole pine (Pinus contorta) and red fir (Abies magnifica). A number of species of invasive weeds have been recorded in the Forest, including thistles, knapweeds, mustards, toadflaxes, daisies, brooms, and aquatic.

=== Placer County Big Trees Grove ===
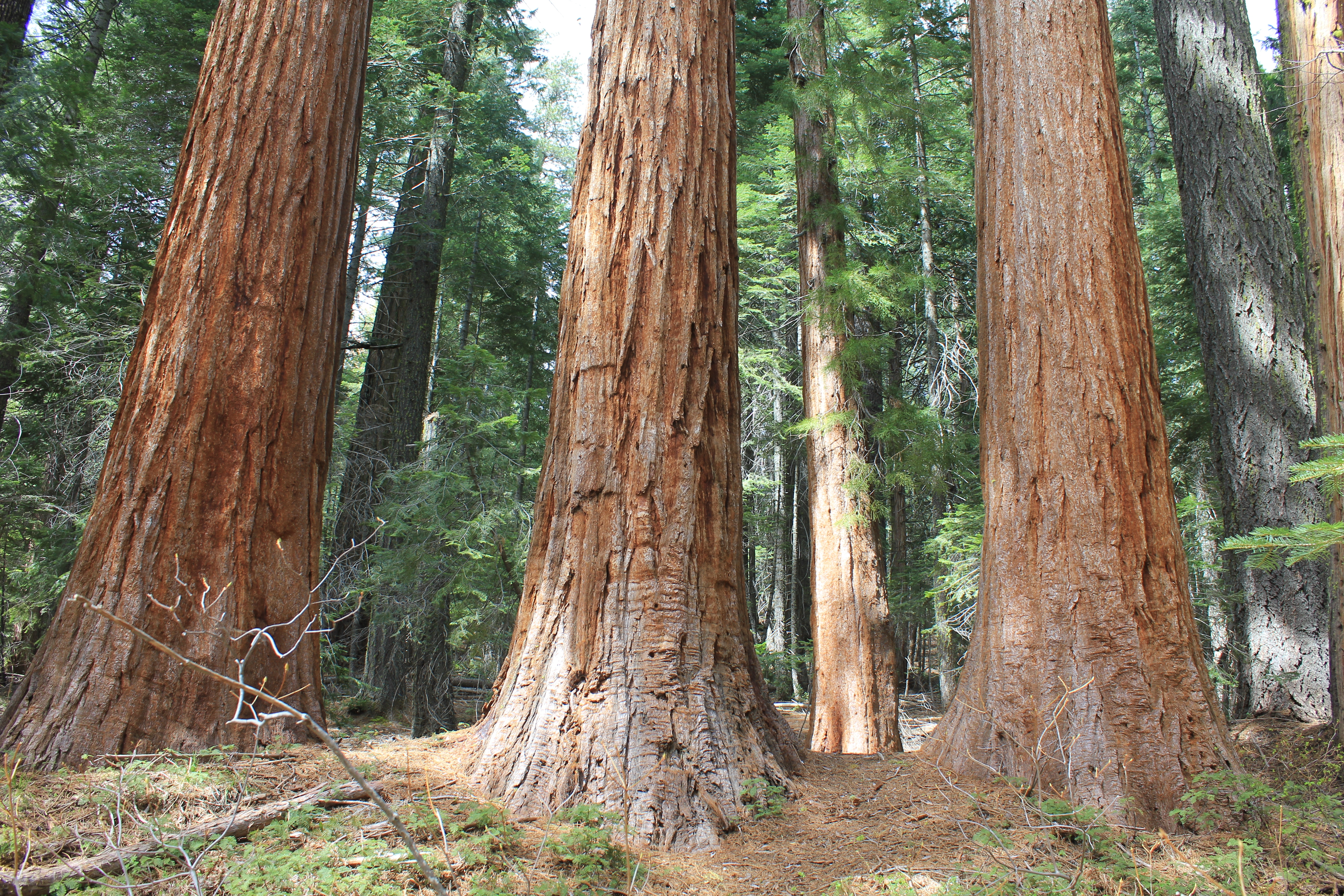
Placer County Big Trees Grove

Placer County Big Trees Grove is a giant sequoia grove located in the American River watershed of Tahoe National Forest. It is known as a "tiny" giant sequoia grove, and is the northernmost grove of giant sequoias. The grove contains six old growth giant sequoias, two of which are considered "giant" size.

== See also ==
- Ecology of the Sierra Nevada
- List of national forests of the United States
- List of plants of the Sierra Nevada (U.S.)
- Category:Fauna of the Sierra Nevada (United States)
- Schroeder Mountain
