= Sierra Crest =

North-south ridge line in California, US

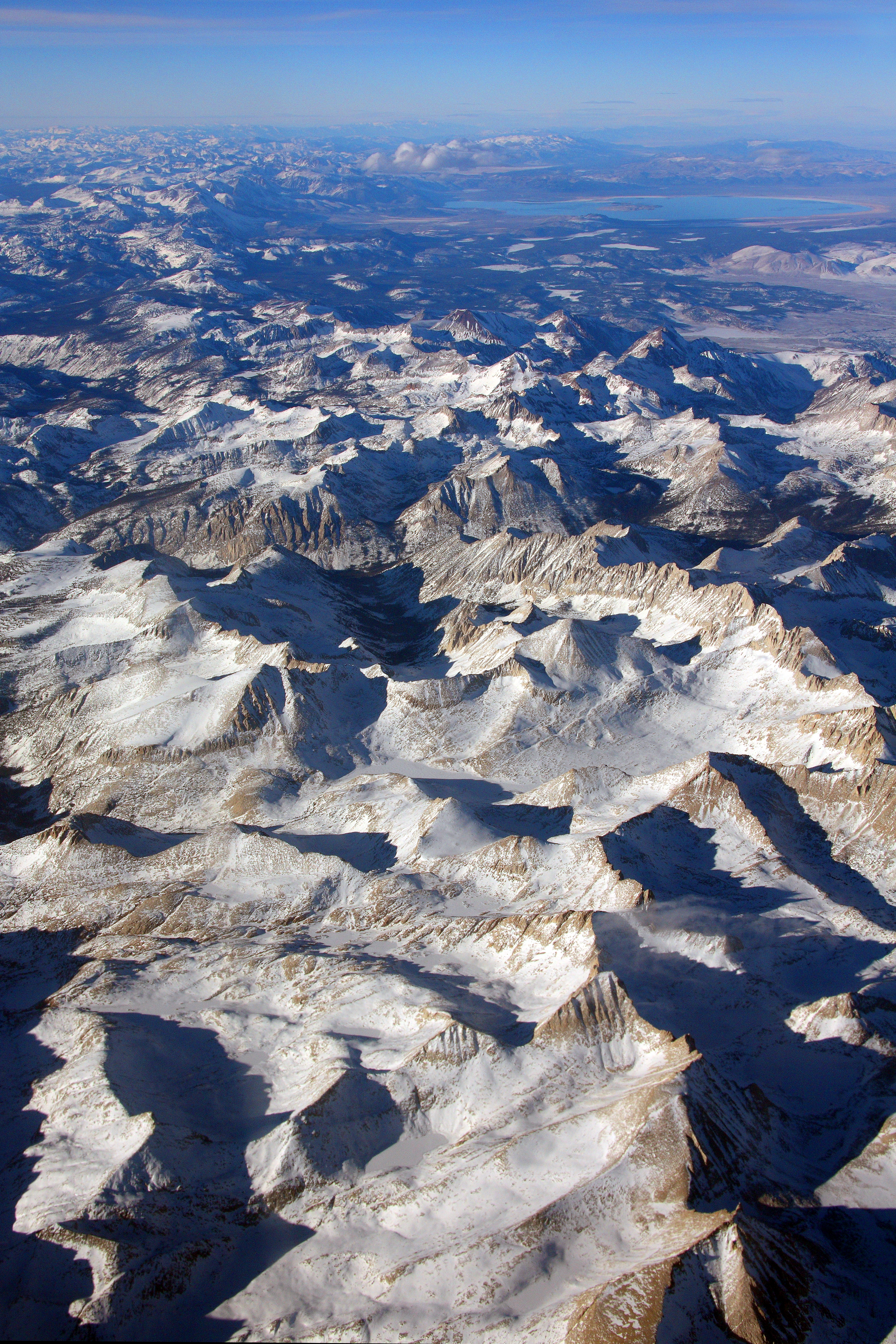
- View of Sierra Crest near Mount Abbot and Mount Mills

Highest point
- Peak: Mount Whitney
- Elevation: 14,505 ft (4,421 m); NAVD88

Dimensions
- Length: 500 mi (800 km)

Geography
- Location: California, United States

The Sierra Crest is a roughly 500 mi (800 km) generally north-to-south ridgeline that demarcates the broad west and narrow east slopes of the Sierra Nevada and that extends as far east as the Sierra's topographic front (e.g., Diamond Mountains and Sierran escarpment). The northern and central Sierra Crest sections coincide with over 300 mi (480 km) of the Great Basin Divide, and the southern crest demarcates Tulare and Inyo counties and extends through Kern County to meet the Tehachapi crest. The Sierra Crest also forms two paths (bifurcates) around endorheic cirques (e.g., Cup Lake) between the west and east Sierra slopes.

Theodore Solomons made the first attempt to map a crest route along the Sierras. He was instrumental in envisioning, exploring, and establishing the route of what became the John Muir Trail from Yosemite Valley along the crest of the Sierra Nevada to Mount Whitney.

Sierra Crest extreme points
