= Hodge decision =

American River
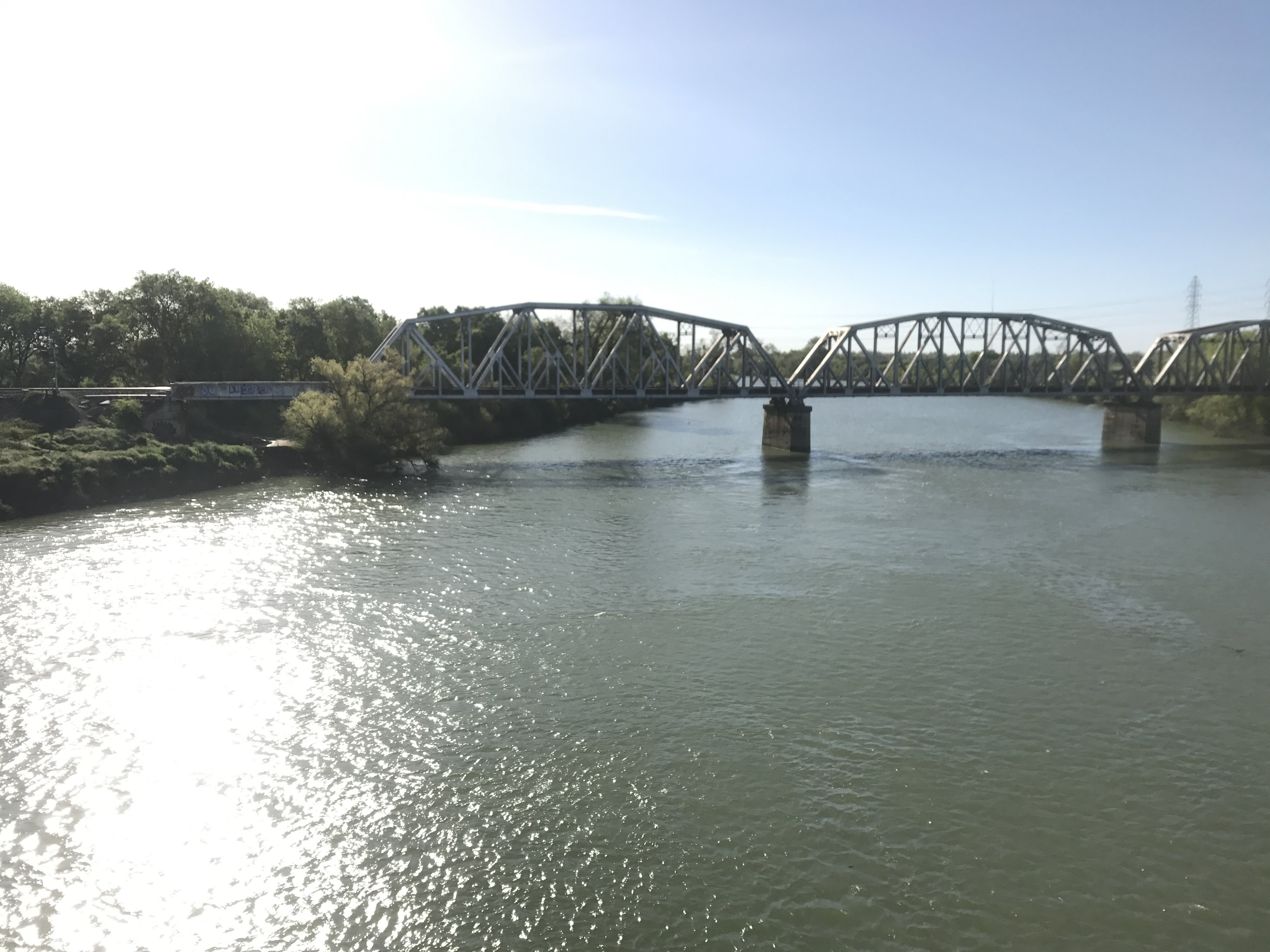
- American River at the Jedediah Memorial Trail Bridge
- Location: Sacramento, California

The Hodge decision is a flow requirement that several water agencies must follow when they extract surface water from the American River. The flow requirements vary throughout the year, with the spring and summer months of March through June presenting the most restricted rate, at a minimum of 3,000 cubic feet per second (85 m^{3}/s). The agencies must maintain these specified flow rates to divert water from the American River. If the American River's flow rate is less than the specified minimum rate, some water agencies must obtain water from other sources.

== Background ==
The American River is the second largest tributary of the Sacramento River and is divided into three sections: Lower Fork, Middle Fork, and Upper Fork. Together, these sections span 120 miles from the crest of the Sierra Nevada, through the foothills, and converges with the Sacramento River in Sacramento, California. The Lower Fork of the American River begins at the outlet of Folsom Lake and flows westward until its confluence with the Sacramento River. The drainage basin of the American River is approximately 1,900 square miles. There are several activities popular to the American River including: whitewater rafting, fishing, boating. In addition, the river also acts as a source of hydroelectric power, municipal water, and flood control from Folsom Dam. Several water agencies in Sacramento divert water from the American River via surface water diversions and groundwater wells to supply enough water for customers. These diversions have resulted in several negative implications on the Lower American River fishery. Therefore, the Hodge Decision protects the river's salmon and steelhead populations and preserve natural river morphology.

== Origin ==
In 1970, East Bay Municipal Utility District (EBMUD) obtained a contract from the Bureau of Reclamation which allowed the water utility district to take as much as 150,000 acre-feet (190,000,000 m^{3}) of water every year using the Folsom-South Canal (FSC). The FSC is part of the Central Valley Project and diverts water from the American River at Nimbus Dam. However, the Environmental Defense Fund, Save the American River Association (SARA), and Sacramento County believed that EBMUD should divert water from a point further downstream, allowing water to remain in the river longer and carry out natural in-stream mechanisms. In addition, SARA assessed that EBMUD's proposed diversion would deplete the river's flow by approximately 10%. Moreover, a drop that large would significantly harm several fish species that were already being monitored due to negative impacts of Folsom Dam activity and other surface water diversions.

== Court challenges ==
The Environmental Defense Fund filed suit against EBMUD in 1972 on the premise of apprehension towards the future of the Lower American River fish population. In addition, SARA and Sacramento County joined the lawsuit as co-plaintiffs ensuing the lawsuit of Environmental Defense Fund, et al. v. East Bay Municipal Utility District (EDF v. EBMUD). After 17 years of legal maneuvering, Judge Hodge decided to enforce new flow requirements on the American River, updating the flow requirements referred to as D-893, to the Hodge Flows. In addition, he terminated EBMUD's right to sell water taken from the American River. However, the decision also cemented EBMUD's right from the 1970 federal contract, allowing the diversion of up to 150,000 acre-feet (190,000,000 m^{3}) of water from the American River, north of Sacramento, to remain in place. Judge Hodge addressed that EBMUD had other reasonable and feasible alternatives for obtaining water for its customers. Thus, EBMUD can only divert water from the American River when specified Hodge Flows are present in the river. Nevertheless, according to the Hodge Decision, if a water agency does not have any other feasible alternatives to obtaining water, the agency does not have to abide by the Hodge standard.

== Hodge flows ==
=== D-893 (1950s – 1990s) ===
Specified flows must be greater than the following:

- September 16 – December = 500 cubic feet per second (14 m^{3}/s)
- January – September 15 = 250 cubic feet per second (7.1 m^{3}/s)

=== Hodge Decision (1990s – present) ===
Specified flows must be greater than the following:

- October 15 – February = 2,000 cubic feet per second (57 m^{3}/s)
- March – June = 3,000 cubic feet per second (85 m^{3}/s)
- July – October 14 = 1,750 cubic feet per second (50 m^{3}/s)
