= Lake Natoma =

Reservoir in California, US

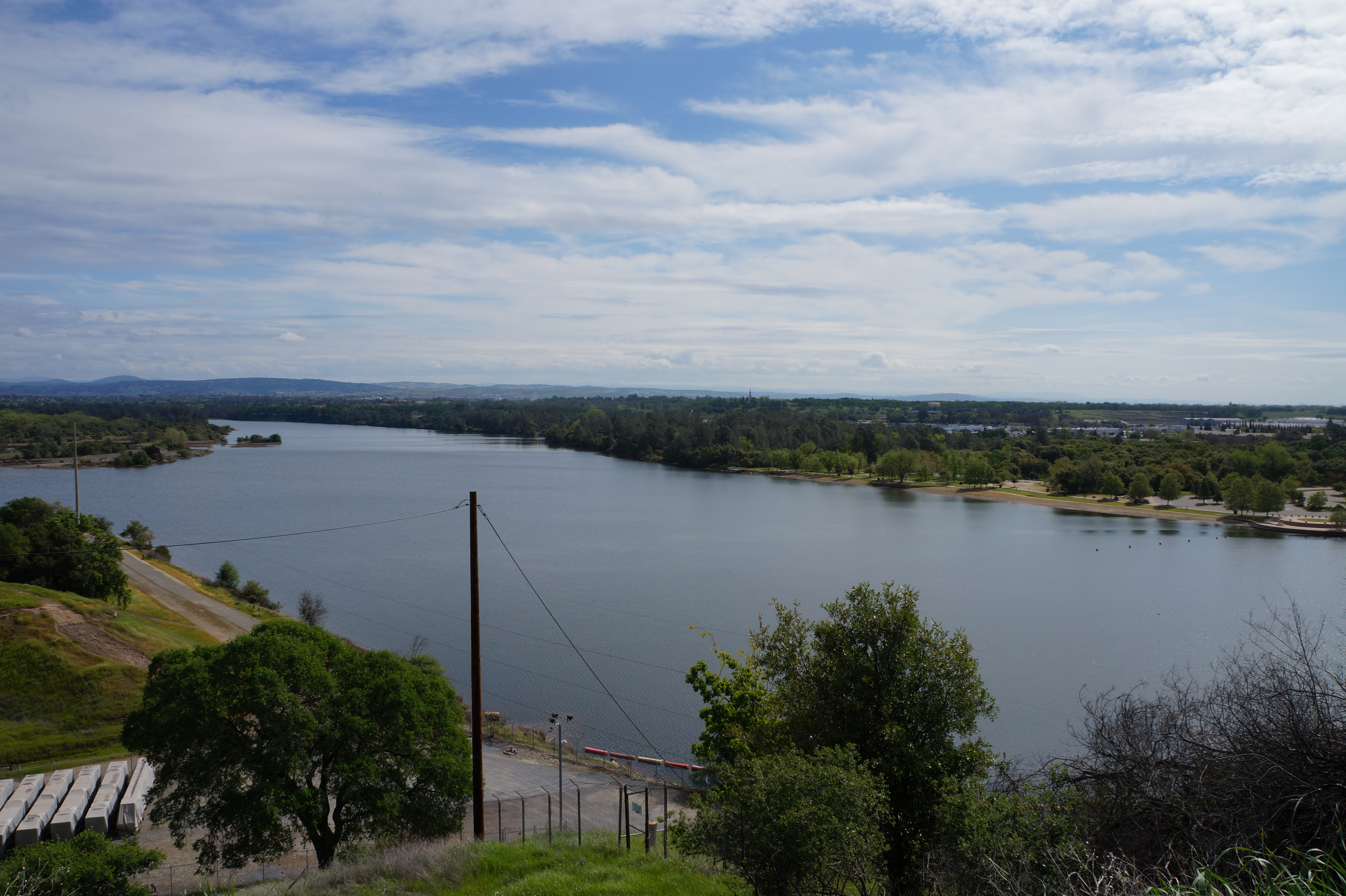
- View from Nimbus Dam Overlook in 2014

- Location within California Location within the United States
- Location: Sacramento County, California
- Coordinates: 38.654°N 121.192°W
- Type: Reservoir
- Primary inflows: American River
- Primary outflows: American River
- Catchment area: 1,898 mi^{2} (4,920 km^{2})
- Basin countries: United States
- Average depth: 46 ft (14 m)
- Water volume: 8,760 acre-feet (10,810 dam^{3})
- Shore length^{1}: ~10 mi (16 km)
- Surface elevation: 128 ft (39 m)
- Settlements: Folsom, California
- ^{1} Shore length is not a well-defined measure.

Lake Natoma is a small lake in the Western United States, along the lower American River, between Folsom Dam and Nimbus Dam in Sacramento County, California. The lake is located within the Folsom Lake State Recreation Area which maintains the facilities and bike trails surrounding the lake. Lake Natoma is located 15 miles (24 km) east of Sacramento, and has 500 surface acres of water. The total length of Lake Natoma is 4 miles (6.4 km).

Lake Natoma is a recreational lake for rowing, kayaking, and swimming; powerboats are permitted with a 5 mph (8 km/h) "no wake" restriction. It is home to the Sacramento State Aquatic Center, and regularly hosts West Coast College Rowing Championships, the Pac-12 Conference rowing championships, and, every four years, the Intercollegiate Rowing Association Championships. The Lake Natoma Four Bridges Half Marathon is held each October at the lake.

Lake Natoma includes the historic Black Miners Bar area in Folsom, the site of a gold rush era African-American mining camp.

The Folsom Powerhouse State Historic Park overlooks Lake Natoma in the city of Folsom. It is a California State Historical site and a National Historic Landmark, preserving an early hydroelectric power station.

A paved cycling and jogging trail encircles the lake along with unpaved equestrian trails. The Folsom South Canal Trail also begins at the lake. Several parking lots and boat launching ramps are located around the lake.

== History ==
This was the site of many gold mining operations in the 1800s.

In the 1950s, after the Folsom Dam was constructed as part of the Central Valley Project work began on Nimbus Dam which would manage water released from Folsom Dam. In addition to maintaining water flow, the lake provides water to irrigation canals and generates hydrelectric power. After Lake Natoma and Folsom Lake were built, the Bureau of Reclamation was given control of operation for both reservoirs and dams.

Around 1956, the Bureau of Reclamation and California Department of Parks and Recreation, also known as State Parks, formed an agreement that State Parks will be responsible for recreational activities on Lake Natoma, as well as Folsom Lake.

In 1979, the general plan for the State Recreational Area at Folsom Lake, including Lake Natoma, was amended three times before it was approved. As part of the 1979 General Plan amendment, the Folsom Powerhouse State Historic Park became a separate unit, not a part of the Folsom Unit.

In 2002, multiple meetings were held for public input and for interested stakeholders to plan and prepare for recreational purposes adequate enough for the growing population. There was a 62% increase in population since the General Plan was accepted in 1979.

== Physical features ==
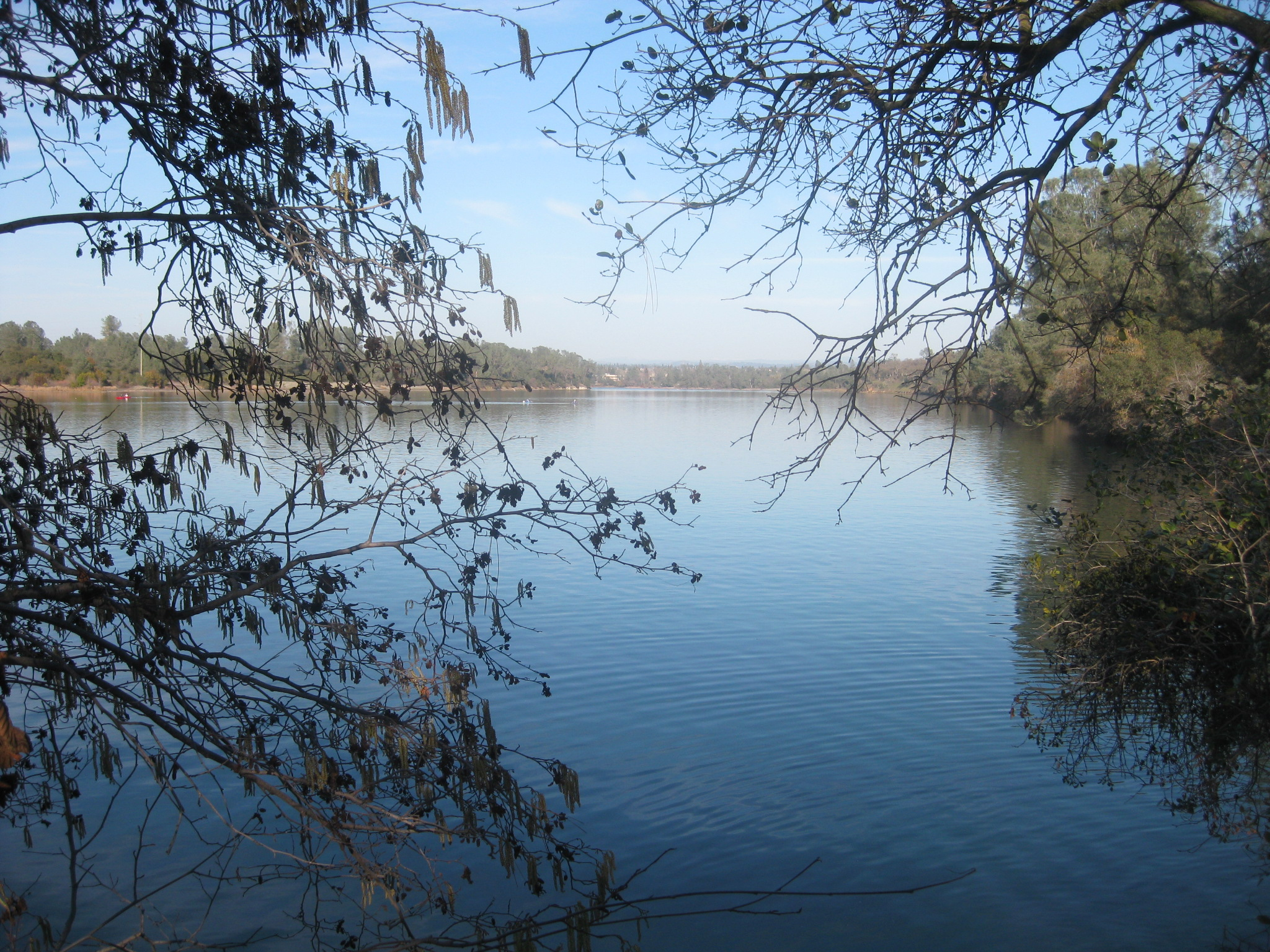

Surrounding this narrow lake are foothills, plateaus, cliffs and river canyons. A dense 14-mile-long (23 km) riparian ecosystem encircles the lake. The Lake Natoma Bluffs stand 300 feet (91 m) and line the lake from Black Miners Bar to Mississippi Bar.

== Recreation ==
The area is accessible via U.S. Highway 50. Since these reservoirs are located in the metropolitan area, the State Recreational Area (SRA) tries to create a habitat suitable for the wildlife that are already living there, to have both "recreation and nature." In 2000, there were over 1.5 million visitors to Folsom Lake State Recreation Area, including Lake Natoma and Folsom Lake.

=== Water and land uses ===
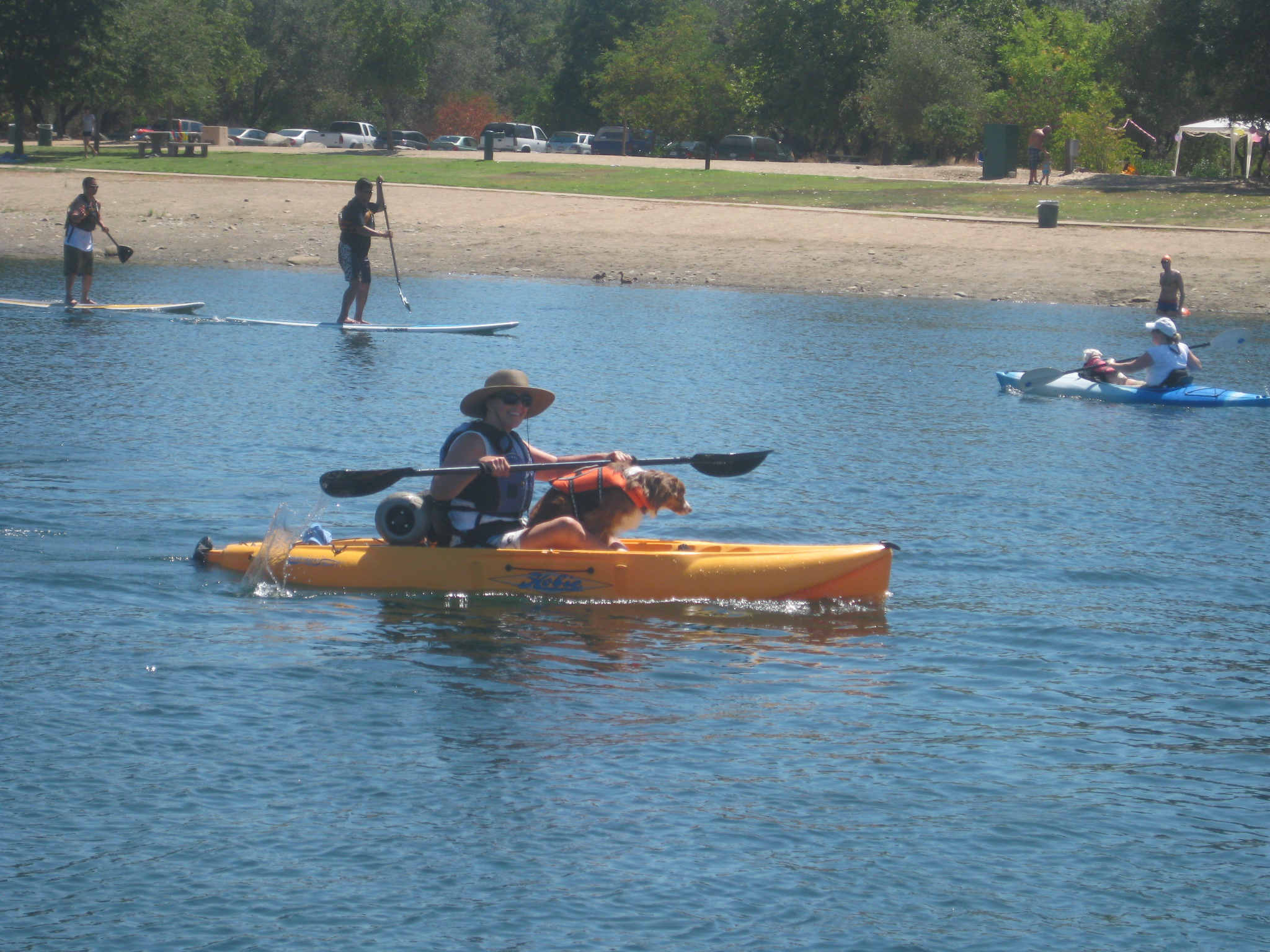

Lake Natoma was first ready for the public in 1958. The common water activities are kayaking, rowing, canoeing, swimming, water skiing, sailing, and fishing. Land activities include hiking, biking, picnicking, jogging, and horseback riding. Educational activities are also available, including information about historical sites near Lake Natoma and Folsom Lake, like the common fish that spawn in the American River, the history of the California Gold Rush, and Native American life before the arrival of the Europeans.

=== Major facilities ===
==== Boat launch ====
The lake has three boat launches for powerboats, jetskis, and sailboats. These launches are well designed with two hard surface launches and one gravel launch. With enough room to turn around, and parking areas. Fishermen like to use the Black Miners Bar launch, as many fishing tournament events occur nearby. California State University Sacramento (CSUS) holds rowing classes here.

==== Campgrounds ====
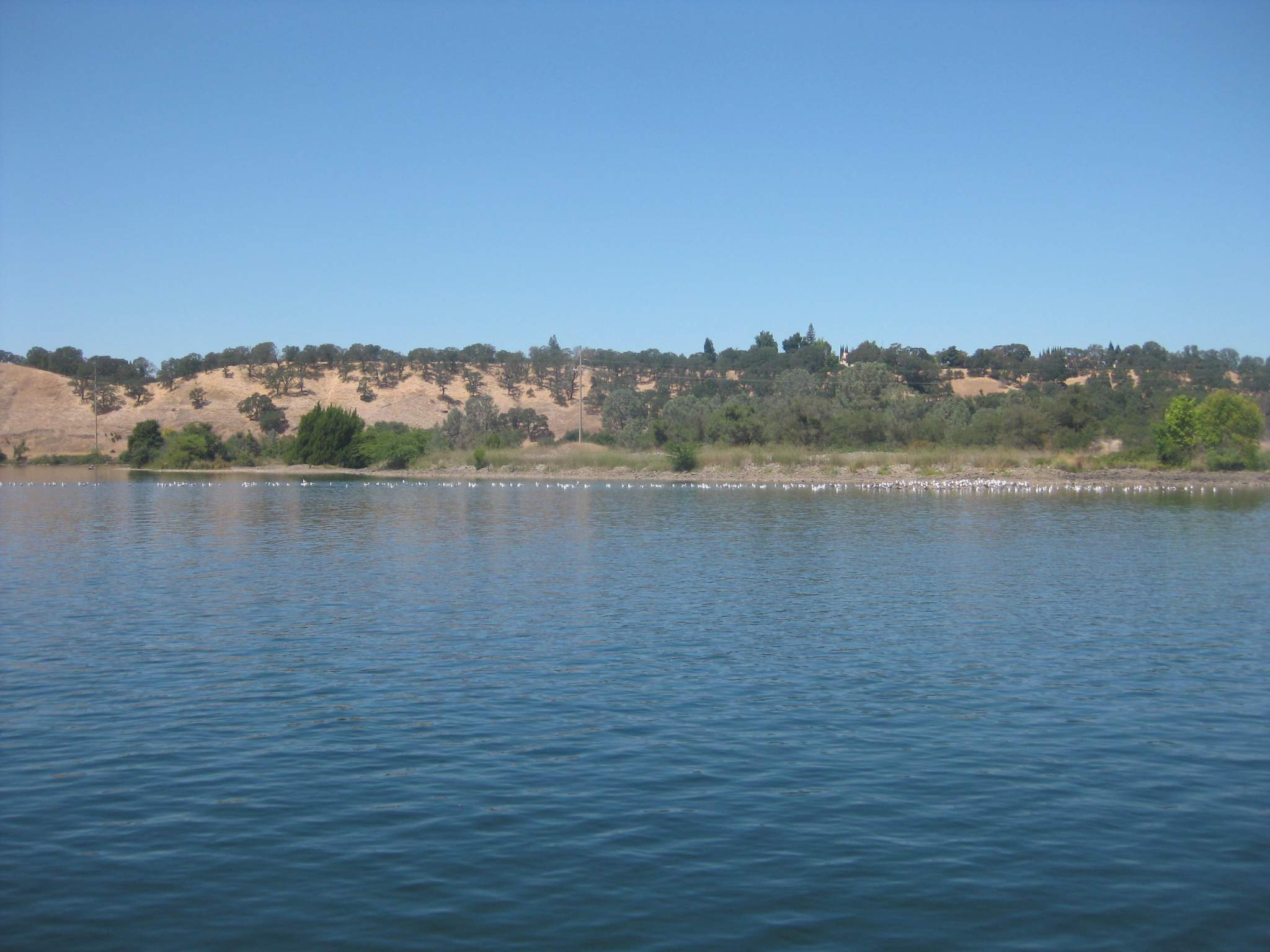

There is only one campground open to the public on Lake Natoma: Black Miners Bar Group Campground.

==== Willow Creek ====
Located at the Willow Creek inlet to Lake Natoma, this area is used for both land and water activities. The area is used for picnicking, birdwatching, fishing, and canoeing. The Lake Natoma Trail is nearby.

==== Aquatic Center for CSUS ====
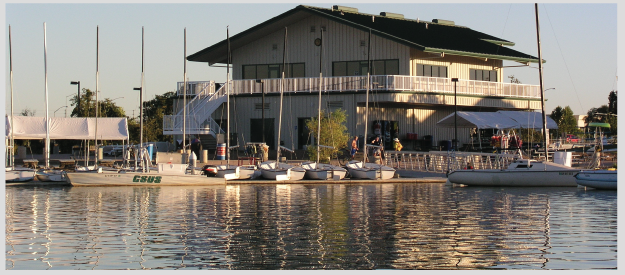
CSUS Aquatic Center

Where the Nimbus Dam ends, there is an Aquatic Center right on Lake Natoma that belongs to the California State University Sacramento (CSUS). This is where CSUS holds some of their aquatic classes, such as skiing and wind surfing.

==== Bike path ====
A paved bike path runs along both sides of Lake Natoma, creating a roughly 12-mile loop. The 32-mile American River Bike Trail, which goes from Sacramento to Beals Point, also runs along the west side of the lake.

==== Dirt trails ====
Six miles of dirt trail lead to Nimbus Flat and Willow Creek. There are also dirt trails on both sides of Lake Natoma; one is six miles and other is nine miles.

==== Nimbus Fish Hatchery ====
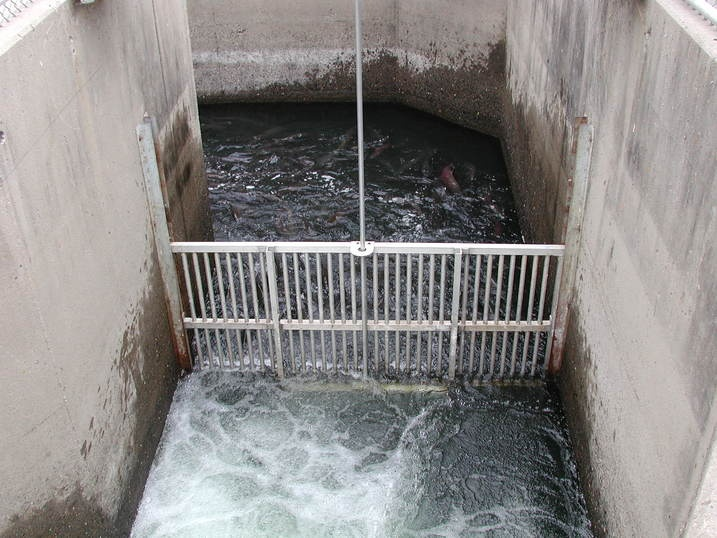
Nimbus Fish Hatchery's end of fish ladder

Under Nimbus Dam and Lake Natoma lies the Nimbus Fish Hatchery, operated by the California Department of Fish and Wildlife, that was built in 1955 by the U.S Bureau of Reclamation. The California Department of Fish and Wildlife operates a visitor center here. The hatchery replicates spawning environments by creating a fish ladder that guides salmon and steelheads to spawn. For recreational fishing in the northern and Central California bodies of water, the hatchery produces 4 million Chinook salmon and over 400,000 steelhead trout per year.

=== Folsom Powerhouse State Historic Park ===
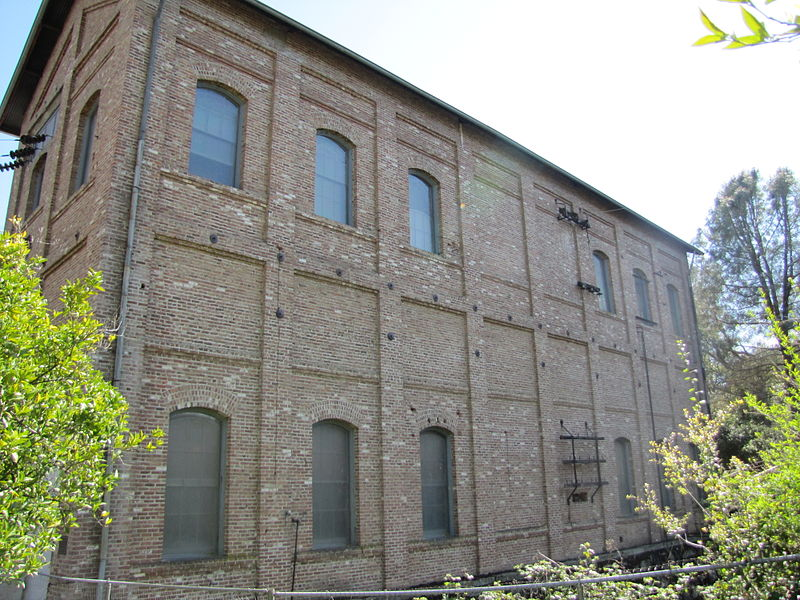
Folsom Powerhouse

On the south bank of Lake Natoma lies the old Folsom Powerhouse State Historic Park, located in the City of Folsom at the intersection of Riley and Scott Streets. In 1895, the Folsom Powerhouse became the first powerhouse to generate electricity for the city of Sacramento. The facility, which included the powerhouse and a dam, operated until 1952 when construction of the modern Folsom Dam hydroelectric facility was completed. The new Folsom Dam rendered the old Folsom Powerhouse obsolete. The old dam that had been used in conjunction with the historic Folsom Powerhouse was removed during construction of the modern Folsom Dam facility. During its operation (1895–1952) the powerhouse delivered 11,000 volts of electricity over 22 miles to Sacramento. The historic site is listed in the National Register of Historic Places. There is a visitor center where the public can learn more about the history of the park.

== Animals ==
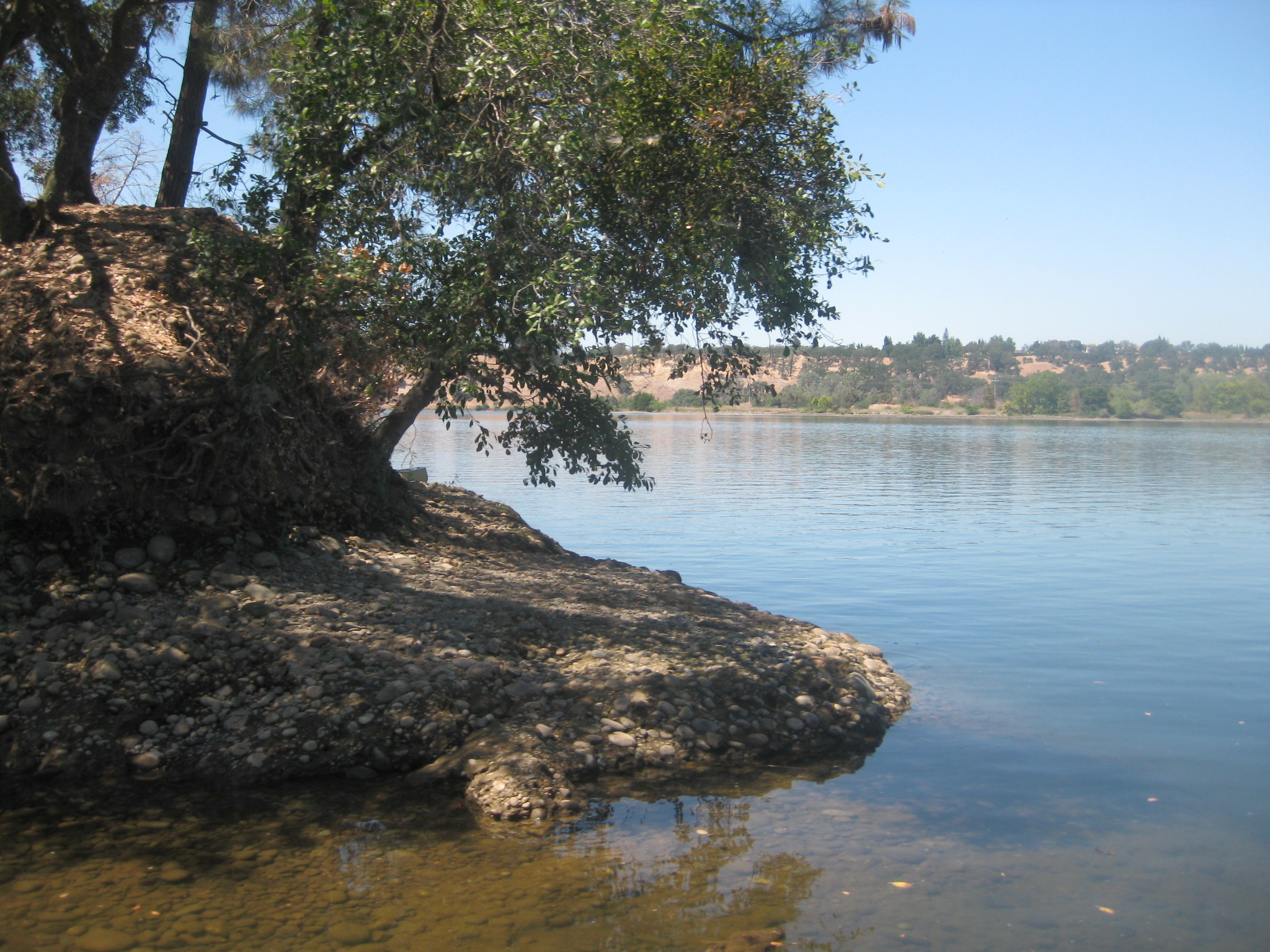

Native animals known to live here are the mule deer, coyote, bobcat, mountain lion, quail, bald and golden eagle, heron, egret, western pond turtle, and California horned lizard. A few common fish in Lake Natoma are catfish and carp. Aquatic animals in Lake Natoma are usually tolerant of warm water and low oxygen level water. Other fish found here are bass, bluegill, and green sunfish. Right under Nimbus Dam are steelheads, Chinook salmon, American shad, and Pacific lampreys. Bald eagles and golden eagles can be found around Folsom Lake and Lake Natoma for nesting; about six bald eagles and two golden eagles are observed annually. Both are protected under the Federal Bald Eagle Protection Act of 1940.

== Environmental issues ==
=== Mercury ===
Fish at Lake Natoma were found to have high levels of mercury in their tissue. A sample of 22 fish showed that mercury levels had approached or exceed guidelines set by the U.S. Environmental Protection Agency, which is set at 3 microgram Hg/g wet weight. Since there were too few samples, it is not known for sure if mercury is randomly distributed throughout Lake Natoma. Concentration of mercury increases as sizes of fish increase, usually because of bioaccumulation. Factors include length, weight, and age. For example, predators at the top of the food chain, such as large bass mouth, spotted bass, and white catfish, usually have higher concentrations.

The California Office of Environmental Health Hazard Assessment (OEHHA) has developed a safe eating advisory for Lake Natoma, based on levels of mercury found in fish caught here.

== See also ==
- List of dams and reservoirs in California
- List of lakes in California
