= Folsom Lake State Recreation Area =

Park on the American River in the Sacramento metropolitan area

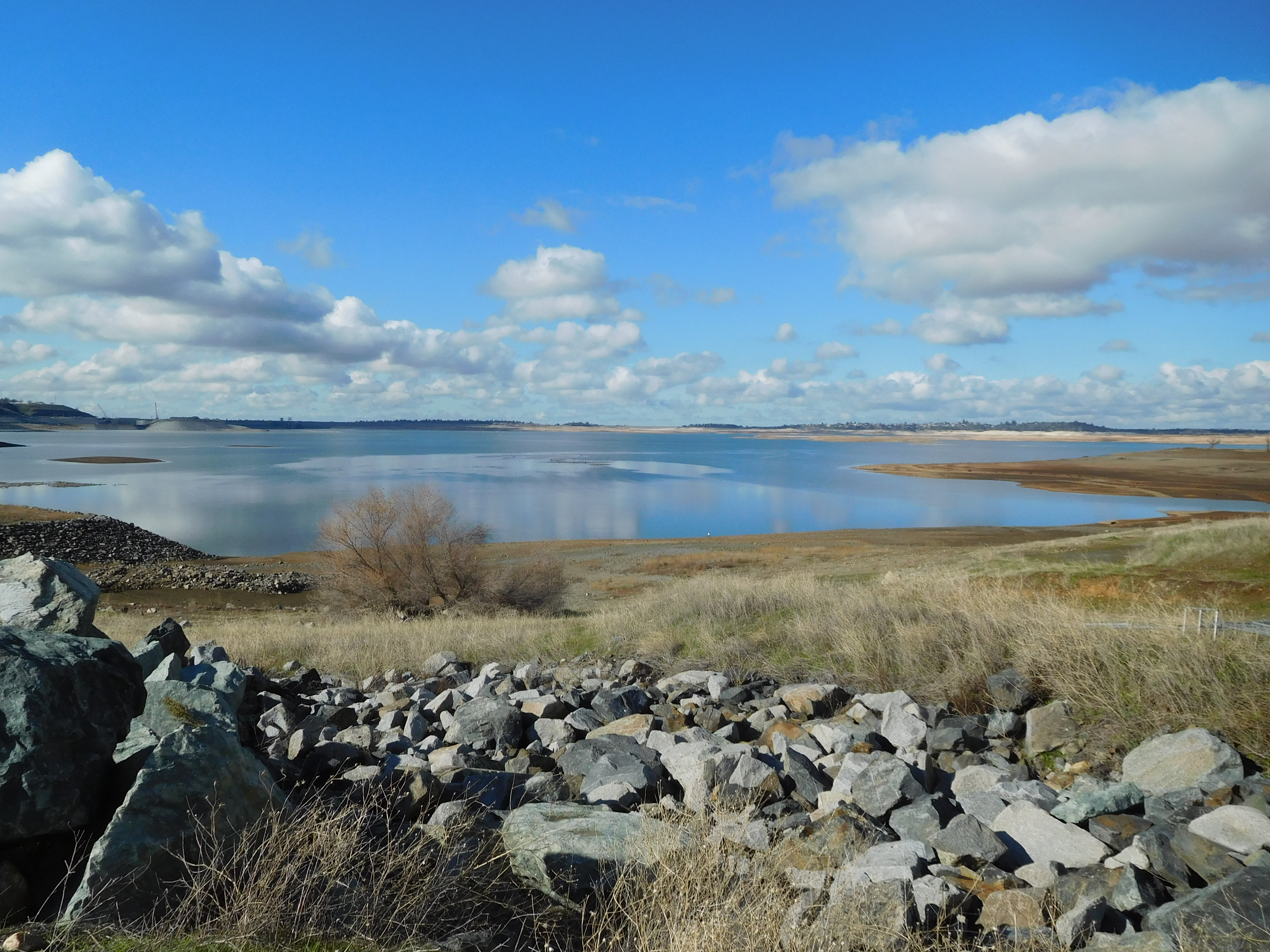

- Location within California Location within the United States
- Location: El Dorado, Placer, and Sacramento Counties, California, United States
- Nearest city: Folsom, California
- Coordinates: 38°43′54″N 121°7′59″W
- Area: 19,564 acres (79.17 km^{2})
- Established: 1956
- Governing body: California Department of Parks and Recreation

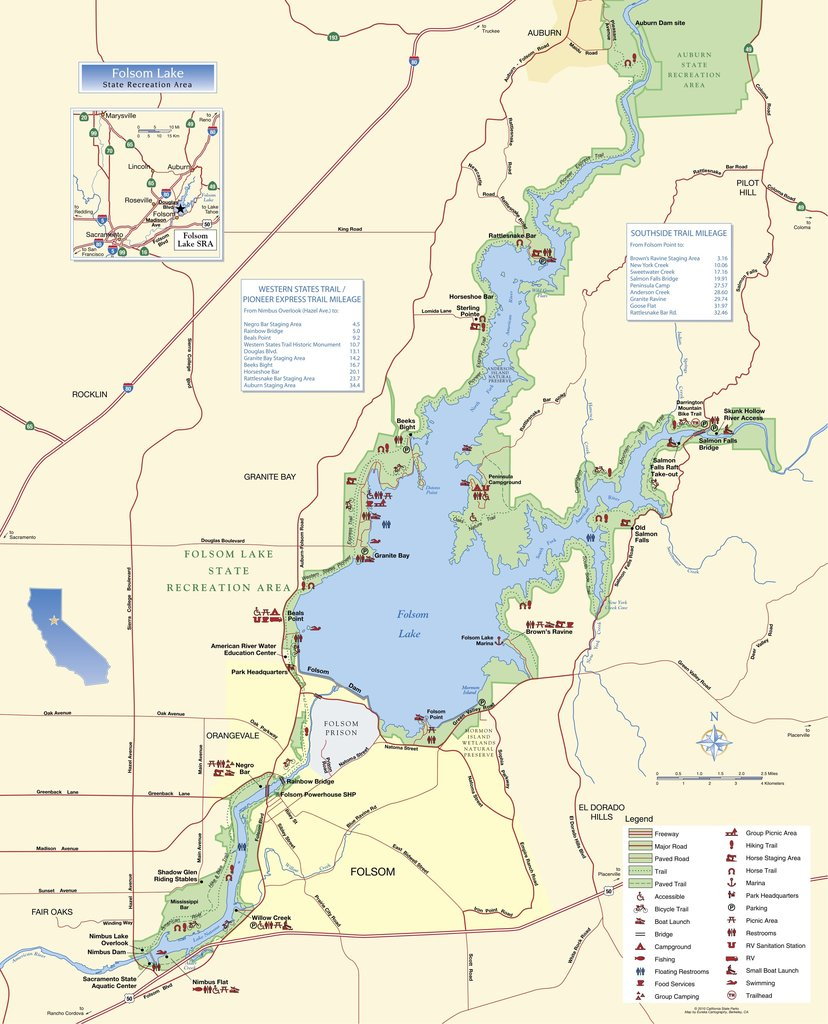
Detailed Map of the Folsom Lake State Recreation Area

The Folsom Lake State Recreation Area surrounds Folsom Lake in the foothills of the Sierra Nevada. The majority of it is owned by the U.S. Bureau of Reclamation and is managed by the California Department of Parks and Recreation. It is located near the city of Folsom, California, about 25 miles (40 km) east of Sacramento.

== General ==
The 19,564-acre (7,917 ha) park was established in 1956 after the creation of the Folsom Dam. Folsom Lake is the ninth largest reservoir in California and a major recreational asset for the Sacramento area. It consists of two reservoirs: Folsom and Natoma. About 2 million people visit the Folsom Lake State Recreation Area every year. Generally, Folsom Lake State Recreation Area experiences hot summers and mild winters. Campgrounds in the area consist of the Peninsula Campground, Beals Point Campground, Black Miners Bar, and Avery's Pond.

The lake and recreation area offer opportunities for hiking, biking, running, camping, picnicking, horseback riding, water-skiing and boating. Fishing offers trout, catfish, largemouth and smallmouth bass or yellow perch. Visitors can also tour nearby Folsom Powerhouse State Historic Park (once called "the greatest operative electrical plant on the American continent"), which from 1885 to 1952 produced 11,000 volts of electricity for Sacramento residents. For cyclists there is a 32-mile-long (51 km) bicycle path that connects Folsom Lake with many Sacramento County parks before reaching Old Sacramento. The park also includes Lake Natoma, downstream from Folsom Lake, which is popular for crew races, sailing, kayaking and other aquatic sports.

The primary recreation season coincides with the spring and summer months when temperatures are in the 80s, 90s and 100s. Visitation is highest from April through September. In the spring months when school is still in session, evenings and weekends are the times of highest lake activity.

There are 95 miles of trail at Folsom Lake State Recreation Area, used by hikers, bicyclists, runners, and horseback riders. A portion of the Western States/Pioneer Express Trail between Sacramento and Carson City also runs through the park. A paved bicycle trail loops around Lake Natoma, linking to Beals Point and the American River Bike Trail.

== History ==
Native Americans of the Maidu and Nisenan tribes inhabited the land around Folsom Lake for thousands of years. During the winter, they lived in permanent villages around the American River and in the summer made temporary homes made of bark. The Nisenan used local resources found around the lake like acorns and berries to trade with coastal tribes. They wove their baskets from willow, redbud, tule, milkweed, sedge grass and native grapevine. In 1848, the California Gold Rush began and most of the Nisenan land was given away. The Nisenan became overwhelmed and their population was severely decimated due to diseases. However, some survived and still live in surrounding reservations.

The Folsom Lake area was also a significant mining site during the California Gold Rush of 1849. During recent drought years, water levels had been so low at Folsom Lake that the old mining town of Mormon Island was revealed. Mormon Island was a sandbar about 300 feet long where gold was found by members of the Mormon Battalion. When news of gold discovery spread, Mormon Island grew and gained a population of up to 2,500 people by 1853. However, By the 1940s, very few families were left in the area due to fire, diminished gold, and a new railroad.

The Natoma Water Company was formed in 1851 by local miners to construct a 20-mile ditch that would supply water for miners seeking gold. The ditch started up by the new salmon falls bridge and reached down to Granite City, which today is named Folsom. The ditch was named the "Natomas Ditch" and it cost around $175,000 to build. In 1912 the Natoma Water Company lined 13,000 feet of the ditch with concrete. In 1953 the government bought most area to build Folsom Lake. The Natoma Water Company is now called Natoma Company.

People from all over the world came to the South Fork and North Fork of the American River to mine for gold, including England, Scotland, Wales, New York, Virginia, Kentucky, Hawaii, and China. They camped next to their mining areas and eventually these camps became small towns. Among these are Rattlesnake Bar, Mormon Bar, Mormon Ravine, Oregon Bar, and Manhattan Bar.

Folsom Dam was built in 1955 as a concrete dam flanked by earth wing dams and dikes, with a total length of about nine miles. The shoreline extends about 15 miles up the forks of the American River. Lake levels at Folsom Lake State Recreation Area normally vary from 460 feet in early spring to less than 400 feet by summer as the rainy weather passes and snow in the Sierra Nevada melts. Downstream, behind Nimbus Dam, smaller Lake Natoma has about 500 surface acres of water. Folsom and Nimbus Dams were built by the Bureau of Reclamation as part of California's Central Valley Project to control the waters of the American River. Other functions of the dams include flood protection, household water supply, power and irrigation.

In May 1979, the California State Park and Recreation Commission approved the General Plan for the Folsom Lake State Recreation Area. The public participated heavily in this plan through six public workshops and over 3,500 mail in questionnaires. The public agreed that Lake Natoma should retain its quiet character but Folsom Lake needed to be upgraded for recreational use.

== Flora and fauna ==
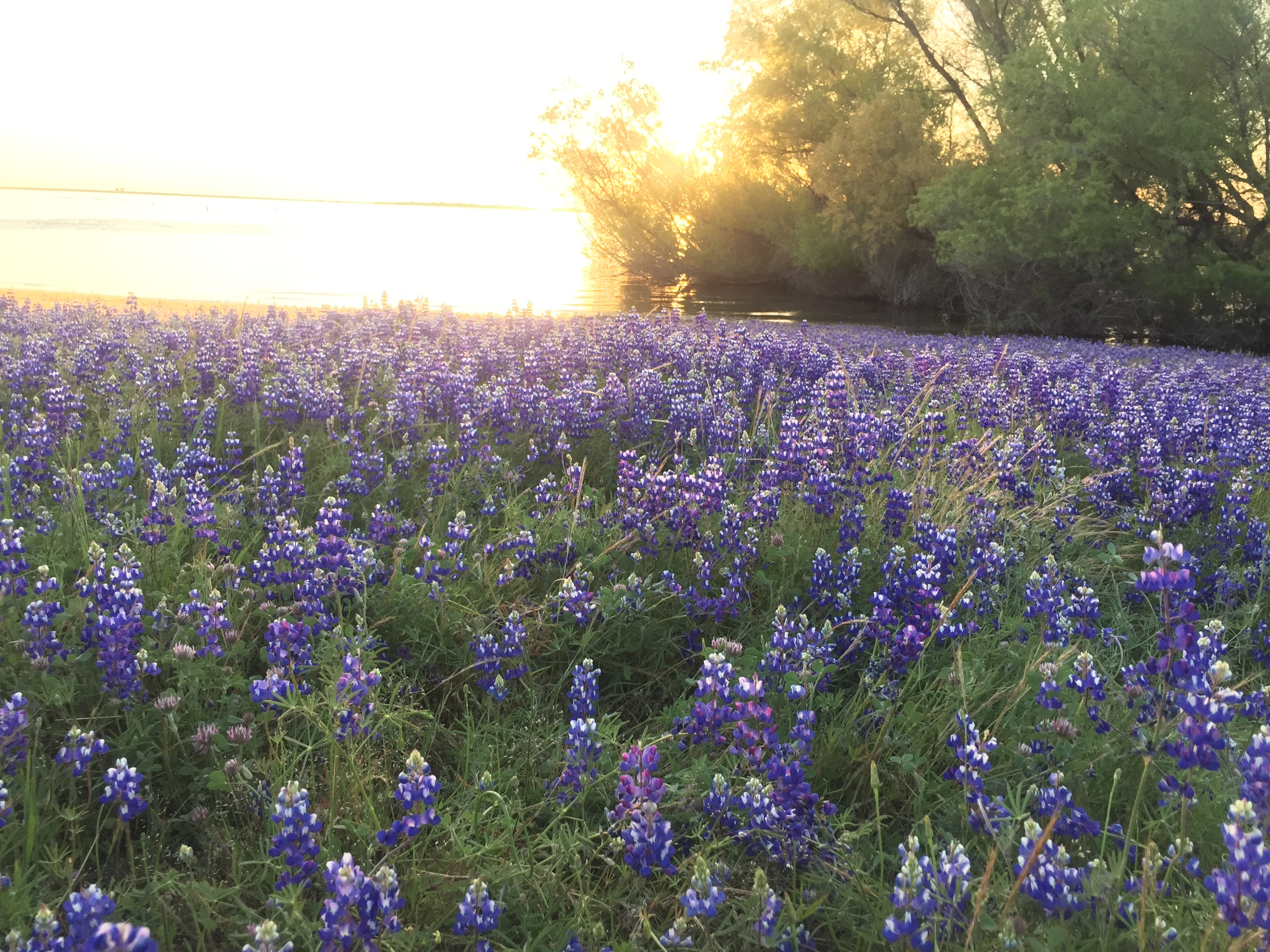
Lupine seen at Folsom Lake SRA

Folsom Lake State Recreation Area is home to many species of plants and animals. Some of the common plants in the area include blue oaks, interior live oaks, foothill pines and annual grasses. In the spring, wildflowers include Indian paintbrush, larkspur, lupine, brodiaea, fiddleneck, Dutchman's pipe and monkeyflower. In addition to plant life, there are also several species of animals including black-tailed deer, raccoons, skunks, opossums, gray foxes and coyotes. Birds commonly found in the area include nesting egrets, herons and cormorants, Canada geese, blackbirds, scrub jays, quails, wrens, bushtits and towhees. There are also wrentits, California thrashers, kingfishers and grebes near the water. Red-tailed hawks, American kestrels, ospreys and eagles may be spotted flying over the area. Rattlesnakes are also common.

The park has many ancient blue oak trees that range from 400 to 500 years old. Vegetation in the area is 50 percent interior live oak, 25 percent blue oak, 14 percent annual grassland, 5 percent cottonwood/willow riparian, freshwater marsh and seasonal wetlands, and less than 5 acres of vernal pools.

Birdwatching is a year-round activity. Bird migration occurs in autumn and spring. Lake Natoma and Folsom Lake have up to 80,000 wintering gulls and some waterfowl. Great blue herons, great egrets and double-crested cormorants begin setting up breeding territories in February and stay until August. Their young can be seen March though August.

== Campgrounds ==
Peninsula campground

Peninsula campground is located at the end of Rattlesnake Bar Road, on the peninsula between the North and South Forks of the American River. It can be accessed from Pilot Hill on Highway 49 by following Rattlesnake Bar Road 11 miles to the campground. It is also accessible by boat for Boat-In camping. It has 100 campsites with facilities including flush toilets, hot showers, piped water, sanitation station, two boat launch ramps, and oaks nature trail. Peninsula is a remote campground which can be subject to winter and/or road closures. Campsite reservations can be made only on-season and during off-season it is first-come, first-served.

Beals Point campground

Beals Point is located on the west shore of Folsom Lake, just north of the dam. It can be accessed off Auburn-Folsom Road, south of Douglas Boulevard. There are 69 sites allowing trailers and RVs up to 31’. Facilities include flush toilets, hot showers, piped water, sanitation station, snack bar, beach equipment rentals, and a beach.

Black Miners Bar group campsites

Black Miners Bar is located on the west side of Lake Natoma. It can be accessed off Greenback Lane in Folsom. Campground facilities include 3 Group sites. Sites A & B accommodate 50 people and Site C can accommodate 25 people. Flush toilets are available. A Group must contain at least 9 people.

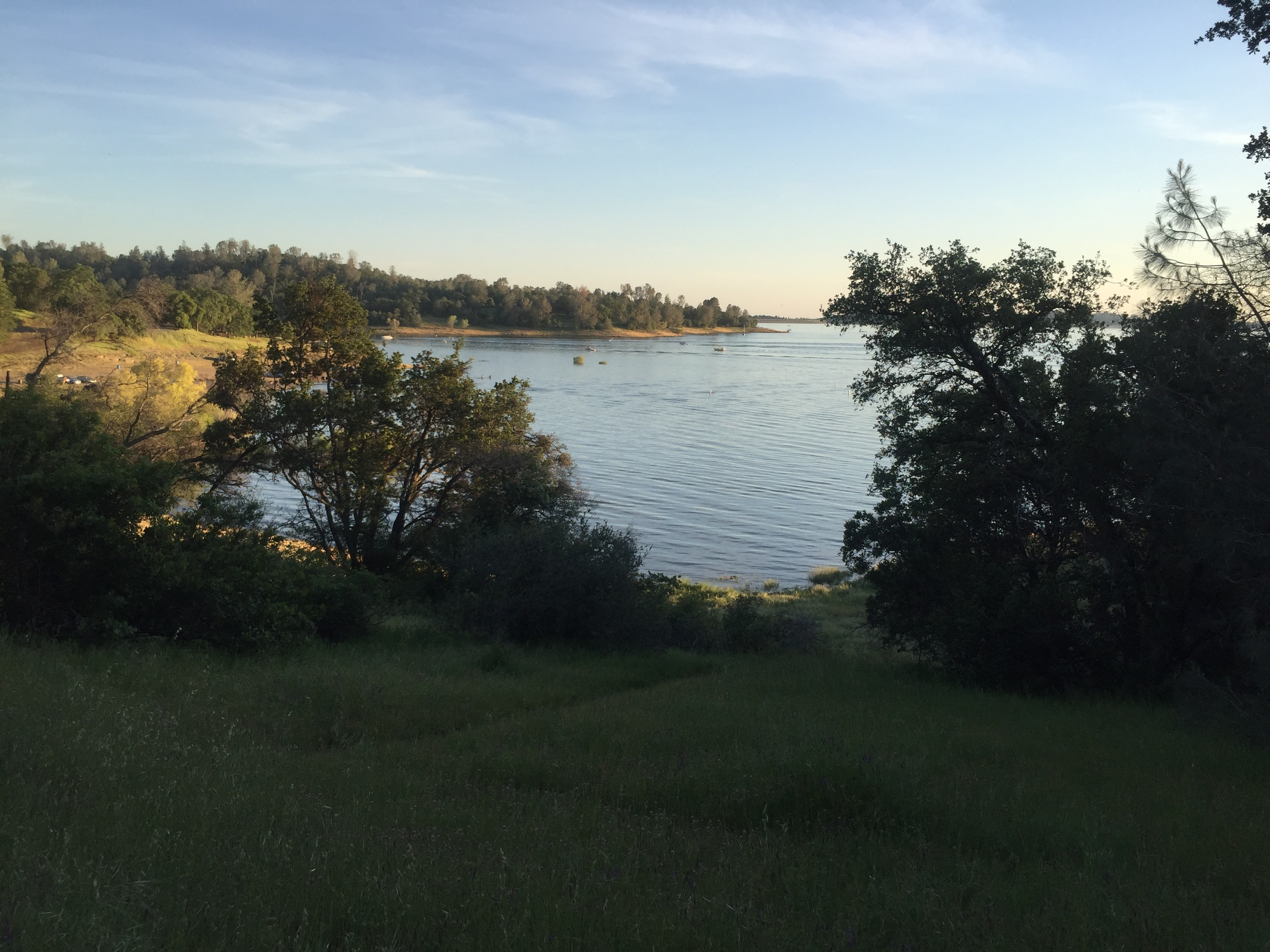
View of Folsom Lake from a hiking trail at Granite Bay

Gold was first discovered along the south bank of the American River in the area originally known as Negro Bar. This site received its name because it was one of the earliest recorded locations mined by African-American gold miners during the California Gold Rush of 1849. At the time, Negro Bar was a large sand bar located on the south bank of the lower American River, in what is now the City of Folsom. Most African American miners left by 1852 to nearby mining sites that were more successful. Today, Black Miners Bar is located on the opposite side of the American River. The site was temporarily renamed in 2022, while a permanent name is being decided.

Avery's Pond environmental campsites

Avery's Pond is located near Rattlesnake Bar, north of the Rattlesnake Bar Equestrian Assembly Area. It can be accessed by parking at Rattlesnake Bar and walking 1.1 miles to the sites. There are 2 Sites and each holds 8 people. There are no water or garbage service and no dogs or fires allowed. It is commonly used as a horseback riding trail. Avery's pond is a historical pond made in the 1880s by a pioneer rancher named Ira Avery. Elevation of the pond is at 530 feet, about 20 feet above Folsom Lake. The 1854 North Fork Diversion ditch provided water for Avery's Pond and water from the pond became a reliable year-around water source for Avery's extensive orchards. Avery used to supply lumber, fruit, and sheep to the gold miners in the area. His ranch consisted of about 117 acres, of which 40 acres had 1,500 fruit trees (pears, persimmons, cherries). The pond is lined with fine-grained alluvium.

== Nimbus Dam and Lake Natoma ==
Nimbus Dam and Lake Natoma are also included in the vicinity of the Folsom Lake State Recreation Area.

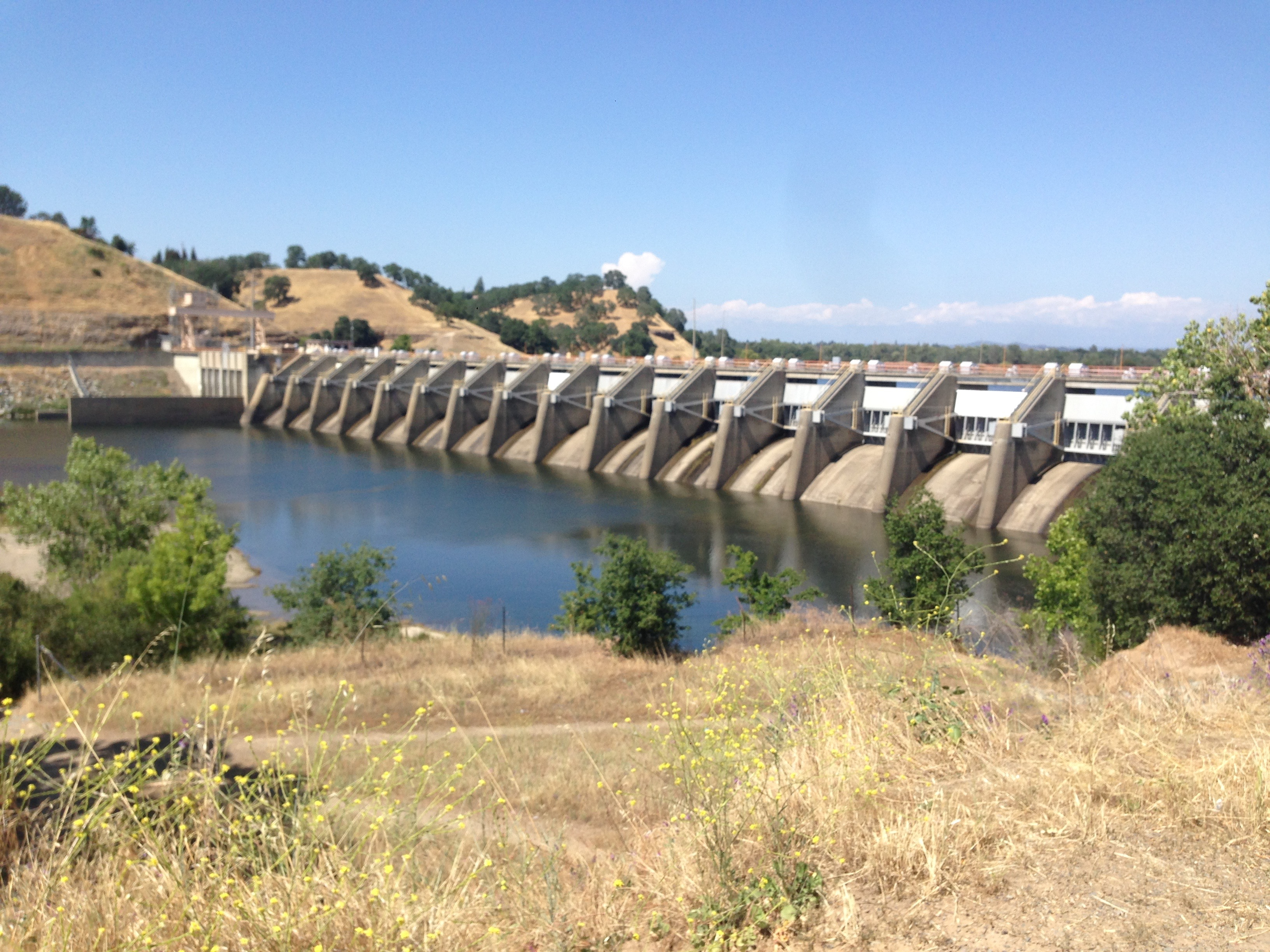
View of Nimbus Dam

Historically, the American River provided approximately 100 miles of stream in which salmon and steelhead could spawn and rear. When the Folsom-Nimbus project was completed in 1958, most of the spawning and rearing areas for the fish were cut off. Nimbus Hatchery was constructed to replace the salmon and steelhead runs that were blocked by Nimbus dam. The Nimbus Fish Hatchery located at Nimbus Dam raises Chinook salmon and steelhead for release to the American River. About 4 million Chinook salmon and 43,000 steelhead are released each year. Educational activities for children and adults are offered. The U.S. Bureau of Reclamation pays the California Department of Fish and Wildlife to operate the hatchery.

Lake Natoma is an intermediate lake along the American River, located between Folsom Dam and Nimbus Dam. It is primarily a recreational lake. It includes Black Miners Bar. The Sacramento State Aquatic Center is also located here and equipment rentals are available for paddling, rowing, water ski and wakeboard, boating and jet skiing, and sailing and windsurfing. The Sac State Aquatic Center is a cooperation between students at Sacramento State, the University Union at Sac State, California Department of Boating and Waterways, and the California Department of Parks and Recreation.

== See also ==
- List of California state parks
- Condemned Bar, California
