= Nimbus Fish Hatchery =

Fish hatchery in California, United States

Coordinates: 38.6333°N 121.2252°W

The Nimbus Fish Hatchery is located in eastern Sacramento County, built on the downstream side of the Nimbus Dam. It is one of the 21 fish hatcheries the California Department of Fish and Wildlife oversees. Chinook salmon and steelhead are raised, and about 4 million Chinook salmon and 430,000 steelheads released each year.

== History ==
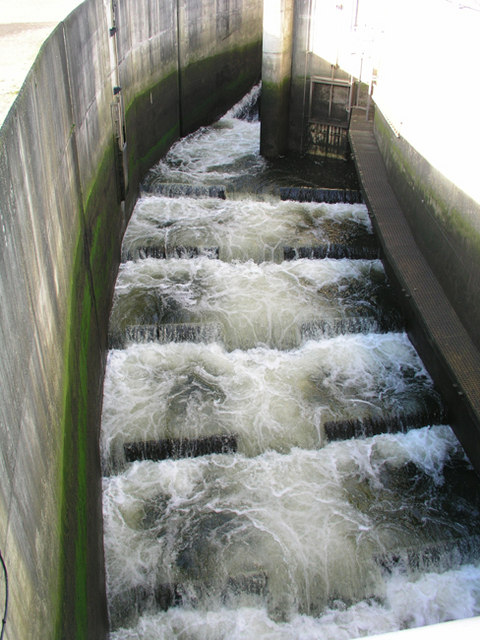
Figure 1. Typical example of a salmon ladder

Salmon once spawned in the far reaches of California's rivers but with the era of dam building came the loss of spawning ground. Upstream rivers have been damned to control flooding. This has greatly diminished the availability of appropriate habitat for the fish to spawn and live in. Historically, Chinook salmon would migrate annually up the American river to the forks and streams in the Sierra Nevada mountains, but Nimbus and Folsom Dams now limit them to the Lower American River. In 1955, the Nimbus Hatchery, weir, and fish ladder became operational to mitigate the impacts the newly constructed Folsom and Nimbus Dams have on Chinook Salmon and Steelhead Trout populations in the American River. Those salmon and steelhead that cannot find a place to spawn in the approximately seven miles of remaining habitat below the dams will climb the fish ladder to Nimbus Hatchery, where they will be artificially spawned and their eggs reared for release back into the river. Specific production numbers to compensate for habitat loss were decided during the Fish and Wildlife Coordination Act Report led by the United States Bureau of Reclamation and the California Department of Fish and Wildlife on August 14, 1946.

== Spawning habitat ==
Salmon return from the ocean to the rivers of their birth in search of specific spawning habitat. They seek out gravel 2-4 inches in diameter with which to construct a series of nests called beds. During development small salmon need side pools on the river in which to rest in the cool shade and to hide from predators. Thick vegetation along the waters edge provides shade to keep the water cool enough to survive in warmer months. Salmon require 7ppm of oxygen and a pH between 6.5 and 8. Many spawning habitats have been destroyed or are threatened by development, water pollution, water diversions, and erosion and siltation. Because of this the fish hatchery programs have been put in place to sustain fish populations.

=== Impacts on salmon and steelhead ===
- Number of fish released annually: Salmon (4 million) Steelhead (430,000)
- Number of fish spawned (average): Salmon (2,600) Steelhead (200)
- Number of eggs taken: Salmon (6 million) Steelhead (1-2 million)
- Average number of eggs per female: Salmon (5,200) Steelhead(5,600)
- Average weight at spawning: Salmon(15-35 lbs) Steelhead(6-10 lbs)
- Record weight: Salmon-138 lbs (Alaska) 107 lbs (California) 62.5 lbs (Nimbus) Steelhead-42 lbs (Alaska) 23 lbs (California) 20 lbs (Nimbus)
- Incubation time: Salmon (45 days) Steelhead (35 days)
- Spawning season: Salmon (Oct.- Dec.) Steelhead (Jan. –Mar.)

The following table displays estimated numbers and geographic distributions of Chinook salmon runs to the lower American River (USFWS and DFG 1953):

Year	Estimated total run	Estimated run above Nimbus Dam	Percent of run above Nimbus Dam	Estimated run below Nimbus Dam	Percent
1944	30,552	23,762	77.7	6,830	22.3
1945	38,656	24,815	64.2	13,841	35.8
1946	38,388	30,684	79.7	7,704	20.3
1947*					
1948	15,000	12,060	80.4	2,940	19.6
1949	12,000	8,028	66.9	3,972	31.1
1950*					
1951	22,000	13,684	62.2	8,326	37.2
1952	25,000	19,050	76.2	5,950	23.8
Average	25,948	18,689	72.6	7,079	27.5

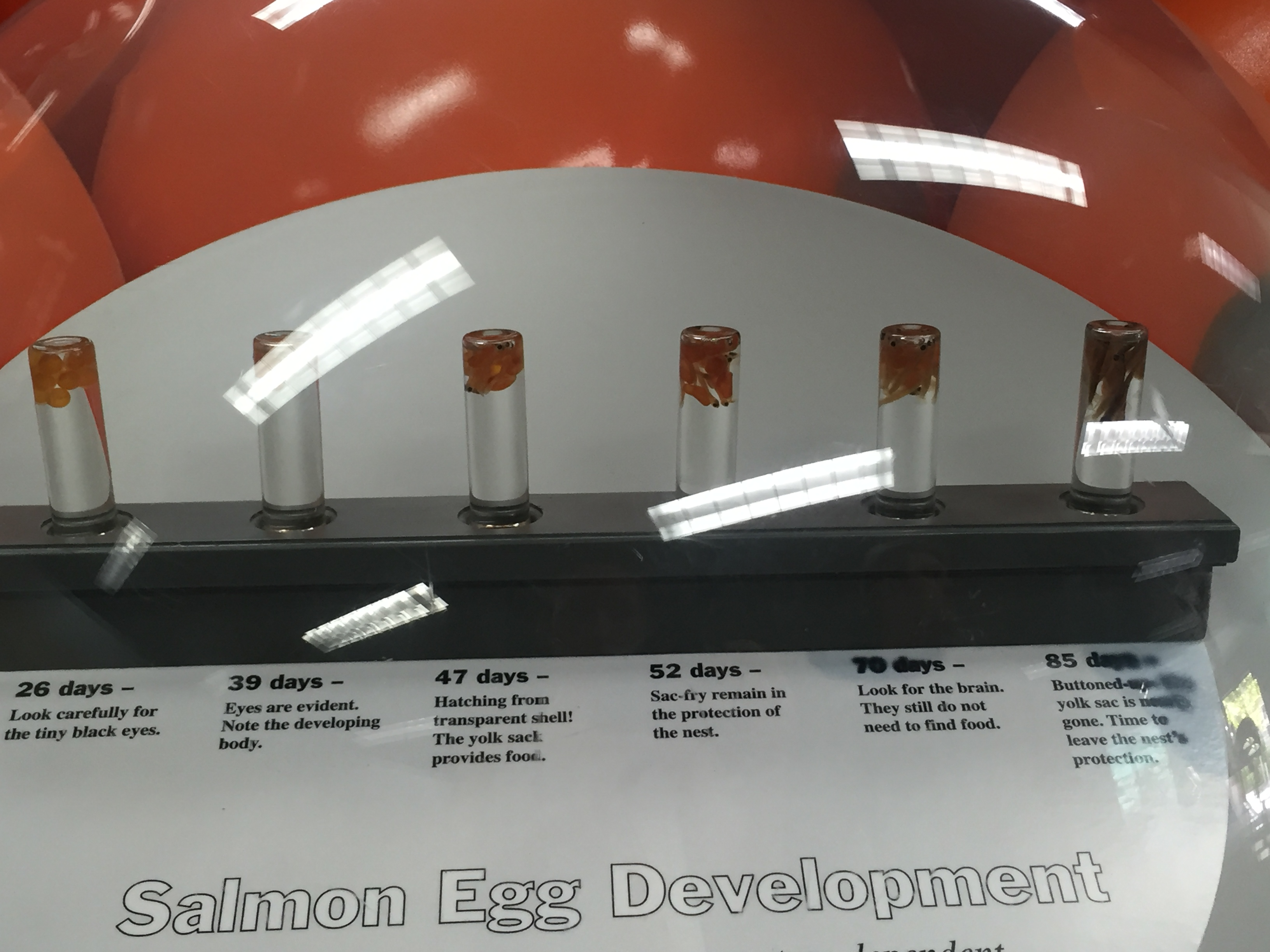
Figure 2. At the Hatchery, one can see the early life stages the salmon undergo while staying at the Hatchery.

== Operations ==
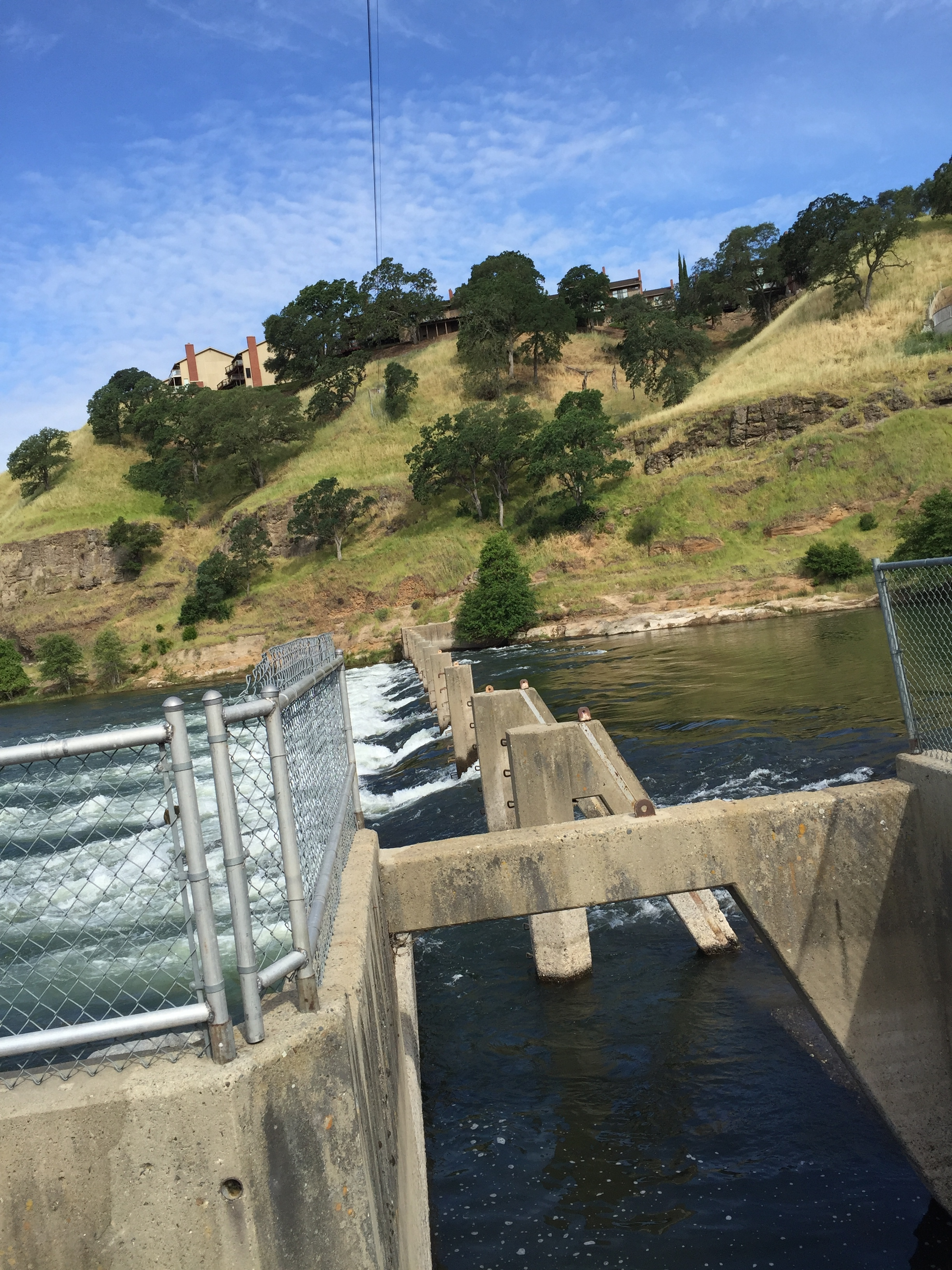
Figure 3. These structures in the middle of the river direct the fish toward the salmon ladder leading to the hatchery during each of the seasonal runs.

The hatchery is operated by the California Department of Fish and Wildlife and owned and funded by the Bureau of Reclamation as mitigation for Folsom and Nimbus Dams. To meet Reclamation's requirements, 4 million juvenile Chinook salmon and 430,000 steelhead trout are raised in the hatchery and then released to complete their journey down the river. Reclamation, the USFWS, and CDFW (formerly CDFG) decided for the Hatchery to be able to hold 30 million Chinook salmon eggs with the ability to expand to 50 million if necessary.

The hatchery is part of a greater interconnected network within the region. The dams upstream from the hatchery generate power, supply water, and are a main source of flood control. As shown in figure 3, the weirs guide salmon in the direction of the ladder to enter the hatchery, preventing them from travelling upstream. From November through March river water flows down the fish ladder to encourage fish to enter and climb the steps to the hatchery. The gate at the foot of the ladder is closed when the holding pool at the top is full in order to prevent overcrowding. Ripe (ready to spawn) fish are brought from this holding pool into the hatchery spawning deck, where workers collect eggs from the females and milt from the males. Fertilized eggs are placed in hatching jars, with river water upwelling from the bottom to simulate natural conditions. When the eggs are ready to hatch the jars are tipped into large tubs where the baby fish (alevin) will remain while they absorb their yolk sacs and become free-swimming. They are then moved outside to raceway pools where they are fed multiple times a day and grow rapidly. Once the fish are ready to begin their outmigration to the ocean, at 60 fish to the pound for salmon and 4 fish to the pound for steelhead trout, they are loaded into tanker trucks and transported to the river for release. From here they make their way downstream and eventually journey out to sea.

=== Release Points ===
The hatchery releases Chinook salmon from three locations. The first location is the Lower American River at the Sunrise Avenue river access, where 1.33 million are released annually. The second location is found in the Lower American River under the Jibboom Street Bridge, where another 1.33 million salmon are released. These two locations use a direct release method from trucks in which the fish are transported through long tubes. The remaining 1.33 million salmon are released to the San Pablo Bay via acclimation net pens. Trucks load the salmon into the net pens during a slack tide at Mare Island near the entrance of the Napa River. As the ebb tide begins, boats transport the pens into the Carquinez Strait, in which the fish sit for approximately two hours. The tide takes the net pen to the mouth of the San Pablo Bay where the fish are released. The Hatchery never performs salmon releases for more than two consecutive days at a single location to minimize predation from birds, seals, and other fish. Salt is added to the hauling trucks as an osmoregulatory enhancer and antistressor, at 0.5 to 1.0 mg/L, in addition to food particles.

== Weir Repairs and Complications ==
Heavy water flows during the winter have eroded the foundation of the weir and piers, prompting major repairs in 1963, 1982, 1986, and 1999. Erosion holes in the weir were a major problem because they allowed adult Chinook salmon to pass through the weir, defeating its purpose and preventing the salmon from reaching the Hatchery's fish ladder. Flow reductions during the repair period lasted around five to nine days. These disruptions negatively affected steelhead in the area by temporarily reducing available habitat space, leading to less cover from predators and increased population density of steelhead, instigating increased predation and disease susceptibility. Additionally, lowering flows raises water temperatures while decreasing dissolved oxygen levels, further worsening aquatic living conditions. The racks and pickets of the weir can handle flows up to 5,000 cubic feet per second, and must sometimes be removed before sufficient numbers of adult Chinook salmon have arrived at the fish ladder.

=== 1999 Weir Improvement Workshop ===
The significant flood to damage the weir foundation and river embankment next to the Hatchery occurred in January 1997, prompting major repairs until 1999. In response, the Bureau of Reclamation asked the NMFS (National Marine Fisheries Service) about the consequences of weir repairs and the safety of federally protected aquatic life. The NMFS requested that “. . . Reclamation and CDFG develop a long-term solution and a schedule for implementation to minimize flow fluctuations associated with the installation and removal of the Nimbus Fish Hatchery fish diversion weir racks and pickets by June 2000” (NMFS 1999). In 1999, Reclamation hosted a workshop to plan for a weir improvement project. Members of the workshop came up with the following potential solutions:

1. Rebuild the weir foundation and use the existing fish screen barrier
2. Add a solid foundation and a downward sloping bar rack pointing downstream
3. Collect fish near the power plant water channel of Nimbus Dam and transport them via trucks to the Hatchery; and
4. Collect the fish at the power plant water channel of Nimbus Dam, and use a sluice (water channel) to bring them to the Hatchery

Reclamation asked the California Department of Water Resources Fish Passage Improvement Program for potential improvements for redirecting salmon to the hatchery. The DWR suggested for the fish ladder to be extended to the stilling basin downstream of Nimbus Dam, with the dam becoming the barrier for the salmon. This suggestion held similarity to two other plans, except the other two used trucks or water channels to transport the fish instead of a fish ladder. After reviewing both options, Reclamation prepared a fish ladder design extending from the hatchery to the south side of Nimbus Dam's stilling basin.

=== Continued Weir Planning ===
Reclamation began weir planning studies in 1996 and continued after the conclusion of the 1999 workshop. In December 2003, two public meetings were held in Rancho Cordova to assess the community's questions and concerns as well as further alternative suggestions for the weir. In 2006, Reclamation launched a series of workshops as part of a Project Alternatives Solutions Study to help with alternatives. The workshops took input from the USFWS (United States Fish and Wildlife Service), NMFS, CDFG, and the CSPR (California Department of Parks and Recreation). Reclamation made an environmental assessment draft that was never publicly drafted. The draft outlined an extended fish ladder design, a possible weir replacement, and a no action approach.

=== EIS/EIR ===
The need for further analysis of potential project impacts, potential changes to CDFG fishing regulations, and public and agency interests led to Reclamation initializing the EIS (Environmental Impact Statement)/EIR (Environmental Impact Report) process in April 2009. The process is designed to find the project's potential consequences on the environment and identify ways to mitigate them. The final EIS/EIR report was published on August 11, 2011. It considered three alternatives for the weir improvement project.

==== Alternative 1 ====
Alternative 1 modified the fish passageway by extending the fish ladder to Nimbus Dam and removing the current diversion weir structure. Alternative 1 was composed of two alternatives - 1A and 1C - because the CDFG fishing closure regulations were subject to change. Alternative 1A would not impact the established American River fishing regulations. 1A would have fishing closures apply year-round within a 250 foot radius of the extended fish passageway entrance and the Hatchery fishway outfall. Under Alternative 1C, the current fishing regulations would need to change to close fishing between Nimbus Dam and the USGS (United States Geological Survey) gaging station cable crossing year-round. The changing of these regulations would require the approval of the Fish and Game Commission.

==== Alternative 2 ====
Alternative 2 would install a new weir structure upstream while removing the current one, offering fish more entrances into the ladder. The structure would perform the same function as the old weir in preventing adult fish from moving upstream. The new weir would be permanent, and would no longer require flow blockages or installation services. The fishing restrictions within a 250 foot radius of the fish ladder entrance and outfall would remain.

==== No Action Alternative ====
The No Action Alternative would leave the existing weir unchanged. Costly, frequent, and disruptive weir repairs would be expected to continue throughout the years. Floods would cause the weir to continually degrade and constant flow reductions would continue, therefore not fulfilling Reclamation's goals.

==== Final Decision ====
The EIS/EIR determined Alternative 1C to be the preferred approach. 1C's implementation will be broken up into three parts. First, the fish passageway extension will be built. Second, operations and assessments of the passageway will take place before removing outdated facilities. Lastly, although not necessary, the removal of the existing weir would be considered by Reclamation once the new passageway is deemed successful for two seasons. According to the Nimbus Hatchery Fish Passage Project Milestone Calendar, the methods of implementation are continuing to be evaluated through 2020.

== Impact and Concerns ==
Each year the hatchery raises around 4 million baby salmon. Winter runs of steelhead trout produce nearly 430,000 annually. Fish grow to about 4-6 inches in length at the hatchery before being released into the American River. To measure the success of hatchery programs and release points, one quarter of the salmon and all of the steelhead have their adipose fin clipped and a coded wire tag implanted in their nose which contains information on hatchery of origin, age, and release site. Nimbus Fish Hatchery is one of many interconnected hatcheries in the state of California that are put in place to mitigate impacts on sensitive species. Other salmon and steelhead hatcheries include: Iron Gate Fish Hatchery, Mad River Fish Hatchery, Trinity River Salmon and Steelhead Hatchery, Feather River Fish Hatchery, Warm Springs Fish Hatchery, Silverado Fisheries Base, Merced River Salmon Hatchery, and Mokelumne River fish Hatchery.

=== Goals ===
The Nimbus Fish Hatchery was established as part of a greater habitat mitigation network. Currently the majority of Chinook fry from the hatchery are released in the American River near the hatchery to encourage thorough imprinting on their home river, which is thought to improve their odds of returning to the correct river as adults and to reduce straying. About one quarter of the fish are trucked further down to the Delta in order to avoid predation from larger fish, such as bass, and other wildlife. The hatchery is also taking measures to install chillers and UV filtration to ensure acceptable water temperatures for eggs and fry in light of the reduced snow pack and warmer temperatures associated with climate change.

=== Concerns ===
The hatchery supplements the natural population but concerns remain regarding its potential effects. One concern is how the hatchery population relates to the natural population. Main concerns focus on competition, predation, effects of behavior, and potential disease. Hatchery fish populations may react to the natural environment differently than naturally spawned fish do. They are coming from a controlled environment in which food was readily available, which affects their size and relative fitness. To better understand the impacts of the hatchery population, research teams are continually studying salmon populations. Hatchery practices are evolving and will continue to evolve as we come to better understand the needs and life history of these fish.

=== Related links ===
- Nimbus Hatchery Milestone Calendar
- California Hatchery Review Report of Nimbus Fish Hatchery
