= Folsom South Canal =

Aqueduct

- Coordinates: 38°30′N 121°12′W
- Begins: Nimbus Dam; 38°38′02″N 121°13′06″W
- Ends: Near Clay; 38°18′33″N 121°11′14″W
- Maintained by: U.S. Bureau of Reclamation

Characteristics
- Total length: 26.7 mi (43.0 km)
- Width: 34 ft (10 m) (base)
- Capacity: 3,500 cu ft/s (99 m^{3}/s)

History
- Construction start: 1952
- Opened: 1973

Location
- Interactive map of Folsom South Canal

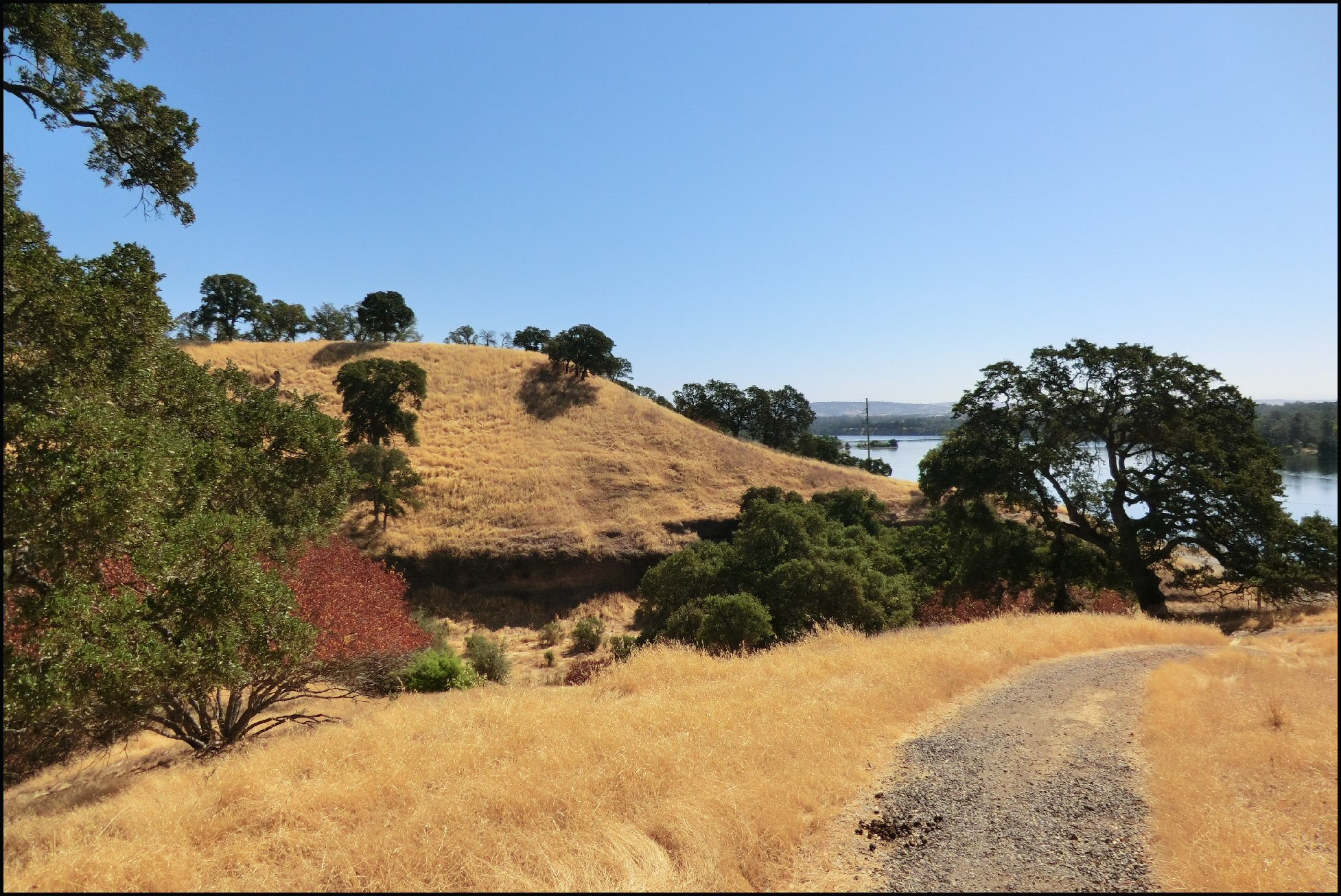
American River at Nimbus Dam

The Folsom South Canal is an aqueduct in Northern California in the United States. The canal diverts water from the American River at Nimbus Dam in Sacramento County and travels about 26.7 miles (43.0 km) in a southerly direction, terminating near Clay, about 10 miles (16 km) northeast of Lodi. The canal is operated by the U.S. Bureau of Reclamation, as part of the Auburn-Folsom South Unit of the Central Valley Project. It is contracted for irrigation, industrial and municipal water supply; formerly it provided cooling water for the Rancho Seco Nuclear Generating Station. It is also connected to the Mokelumne Aqueduct, which provides a large portion of the San Francisco Bay Area's water supply.

The trapezoidal concrete canal has an average bottom width of 34 feet (10 m), an average depth of 17.8 feet (5.4 m), and a capacity of 3,500 cubic feet per second (99 m^{3}/s). Although it was originally planned to be 69 miles (111 km) long, extending into San Joaquin County, there are currently no plans to construct the remaining sections.

Construction of the canal began on July 28, 1952, with the excavation of the diversion inlet channel at Nimbus Dam, then also under construction. However, work on the main section of the canal was not begun for almost 20 years. In 1970 and 1971 the Bureau of Reclamation awarded three contracts for Folsom South Canal construction to Syblon-Reid Company, Gordon H. Ball Inc., and Western Contracting Company for a total of $25,556,469. The first water delivery was on June 27, 1973, and the canal was completed by the end of 1973.

The canal provides water to about 7,000 acres (2,800 ha) of farmland, with $12 million in annual revenue. In 1991, water deliveries excluding irrigation amounted to 39,000-acre-foot (48,000,000 m^{3}).

The Folsom South Canal Trail, a paved hiking/biking path, runs along the canal from the northern end of the canal near the Nimbus Dam (0.3 mi) to Sloughhouse Rd (13.9 mi).

== See also ==
- Water in California
