= Folsom Lake =

Reservoir on the American River in the Sacramento metropolitan area

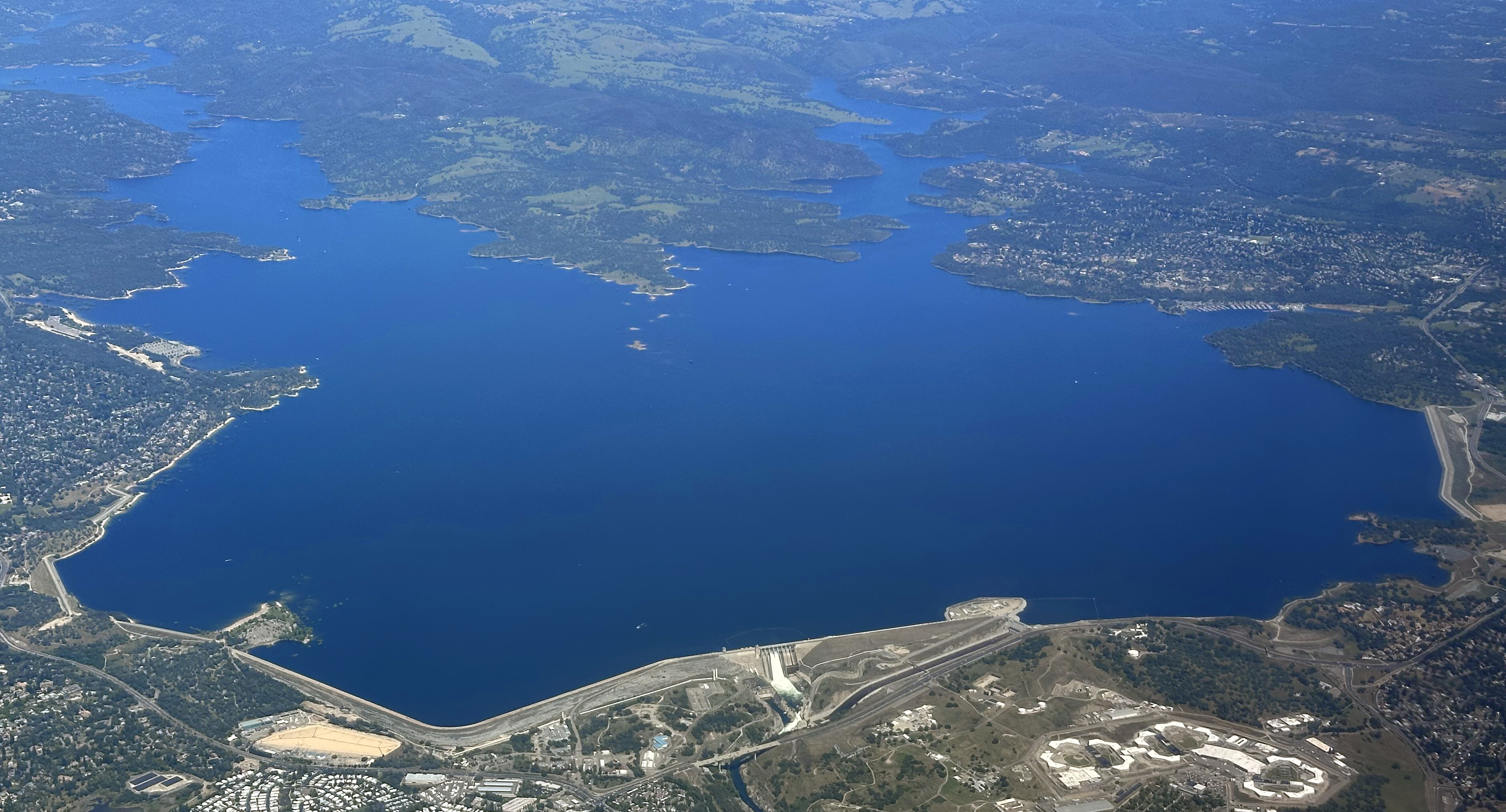
- Folsom Lake in 2026

- Location in California
- Location: Northern California
- Coordinates: 38.73°N 121.14°W
- Type: Reservoir
- Primary inflows: American River
- Primary outflows: American River
- Basin countries: United States
- Surface area: 11,450 acres (4,630 ha)
- Water volume: 976,000 acre-feet (1.204×10^{9} m^{3})
- Dam: Folsom Dam

Folsom Lake is a reservoir on the American River in the Sierra Nevada foothills of California, United States. Folsom Lake State Recreation Area, which encompasses the lake, is one of the most visited parks in the California park system.

Located within Placer, El Dorado, and Sacramento Counties, it is about 25 mi (40 km) northeast of Sacramento. The lake surface area is 11,500 acres (4,700 ha), its elevation is 466 ft (142 m), and it has 75 mi (121 km) of undulated shoreline.

== History ==
The Folsom Lake reservoir is formed by Folsom Dam, built in 1955 to control and retain the American River. The dam and reservoir are part of the Folsom Project, which also includes the Nimbus afterbay reservoir and dam facilities. The Folsom Project, operated by the United States Bureau of Reclamation, is part of the Central Valley Project, a multipurpose project that provides flood control, hydroelectricity, drinking water, and water for irrigation.

When the dam was built, it was designed to hold 976,000 acre-feet (1,204,000 dam^{3}) with a surface area of 11,450 acres (4,630 ha). The dam is 1,400 feet wide and 340 feet high. It is a concrete structure with approximately 9 miles of earth-fill wing dams and dikes supporting its surrounding areas.

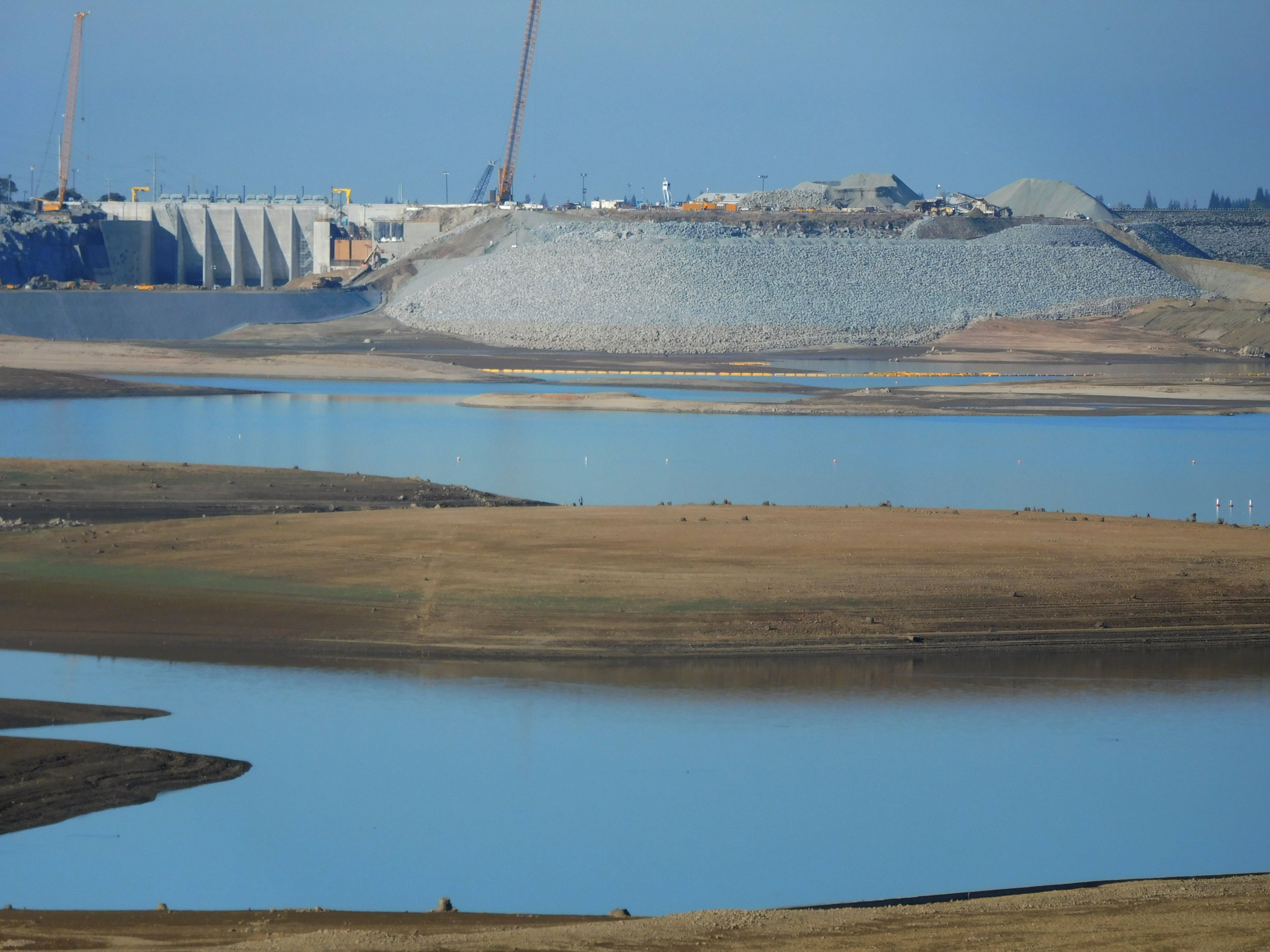
Folsom Lake during the 2011–2017 California drought

During the drought of late 2013, part of the 2012–13 North American drought, the town known as Mormon Island reappeared 58 years after being submerged under Folsom Lake, with stone walls from some of the outlying areas being revealed by the shrinking lake.

In June 2021, the remains were found of a plane, initially believed to be the Piper Comanche 250 which went missing on New Year's Day 1965. The plane was later confirmed to have crashed in 1986.

== Folsom Lake State Recreation Area ==
The Folsom Lake State Recreation Area surrounds the reservoir, and is managed by the California Department of Parks and Recreation. The lake supports a large number of recreational activities. Aquatic activities account for 85% of all recreation visits to the area, which are designated for hiking, camping, and biking. The lake is also commonly used for fishing, boating, water skiing, and horseback riding.

The majority of the Folsom Lake State Recreation Area is owned by the US Department of the Interior Bureau of Reclamation, and is managed by the state parks.

Two major freeways feed access to the recreation area, Interstate 80 and U.S. Route 50. Several local roadways, trails, and public transportation routes access the area, including Douglas Boulevard, Auburn-Folsom Road, East Natoma Street, Green Valley Road, and Salmon Falls Road. The most recognized regional trails are the Jedediah Smith Memorial Trail and Pioneer Express Trail. The public transport that accesses the recreation area include Placer County Transit, Folsom Stage Line, Roseville Transit, and Sacramento Regional Transit.

The recreation area is located at the union of the north and south forks of the American River. About 20,000 acres of water and land are within the boundaries of the recreation area; it spans parts of El Dorado, Placer, and Sacramento Counties, as well as the City of Folsom.

Also, when water levels are low, on the eastern side of Folsom Lake a hidden bridge may appear. This is called Salmon Falls Bridge and was once used to get from El Dorado County to Sacramento. This bridge now takes you to Folsom Lake recreational park and you can enter without paying the entrance fee.

Fish species include largemouth bass, smallmouth bass, spotted bass, rainbow trout, chinook salmon, catfish, sunfish, pikeminnows, and carp. The California Office of Environmental Health Hazard Assessment has developed a safe eating advisory for Folsom Lake based on levels of mercury found in fish caught here. The fishing is tough due to the always rising and falling water levels of the lake.

Three major day-use areas are on the lake: Granite Bay, Beals Point, and Folsom Point. Granite Bay and Beals Point are the primary visitor areas on the western shoreline of Folsom Lake, with large day-use areas that include swim beaches, boat-launch facilities, restrooms, landscaped picnic areas, snack-food and beach-equipment concessions, trailheads, and associated parking. The Granite Bay facility includes a multiuse activity center available to rent and Beals Point includes a 69-site campground. The smaller and more remote Rattlesnake Bar visitor area provides boat-launch facilities and informal access to the shoreline for fishing, swimming, and picnicking.

The eastern shoreline is home to Browns Ravine and Folsom Point. Browns Ravine includes the Folsom Lake Marina, which provides 675 wet slips, 175 dry-storage spaces, boat-launch areas, marine provisions and fueling stations, a small picnic area, and restrooms. Folsom Point includes a picnic area, boat launch, and restrooms. Facilities at these locations include swim beaches, picnic areas, food and beach equipment concessions, equestrian staging areas, restrooms and drinking water fountains, and trail heads with over 94 miles of trails (used by hikers, runners, mountain bikers, and horseback riders).

== Wildlife ==
California buckeye, gray pine, blue oak, valley oak, black oak, and occasionally oracle oak trees populate the area surrounding the lake. A variety of wildflowers thrive in the spring; Indian paintbrush, California poppy, larkspur, lupine, brodiaea, fiddleneck, Dutchman's pipe, and monkeyflower can be seen throughout the SRA.

A number of mammals inhabit the lake area, including coyotes, gray foxes, rabbits, skunks, raccoons, ground squirrels, black-tailed deer, beavers, and opossums, and on occasion, mountain lions, bobcats, and black bears have been sighted.

Several bird species call Folsom Lake home year-round, including bushtits, quails, wrens, scrub jays, blackbirds, and towhees. Near the water, visitors often see kingfishers, red-tailed hawks, bald eagles, and other raptors looking for a meal.

Rattlesnakes are also common around Folsom Lake.

== Flood control ==
From October 1 through May 31, the dam and lake are used to prevent flooding on the lower end of the American River. The Sacramento Basin is notorious for flooding, and the dam helps relieve winter storm runoff and snow melt from the Sierra.

It is a major component of the American River Watershed. During the summer, water is released to prevent saltwater intrusion in the San Joaquin Delta. These releases maintain water quality and keep ideal water temperatures for anadromous fish species such as Chinook salmon, steelhead, and American shad. Several of these species are of primary concern due to their decline in numbers and spawning habitat destruction.

Water in Folsom Lake is also used for drinking water and power generation throughout the year. As a reservoir, the water levels in the lake fluctuate between 440 ft in the early summer and 405 ft in the early winter. In drought years, the water levels can be drawn below 400 ft. Some of the factors that affect these levels include precipitation, downstream flows, and fishery needs.

== See also ==
- List of dams and reservoirs in California
- List of largest reservoirs of California
- Lakes of the Sierra Nevada (United States)
