= Nimbus Dam =

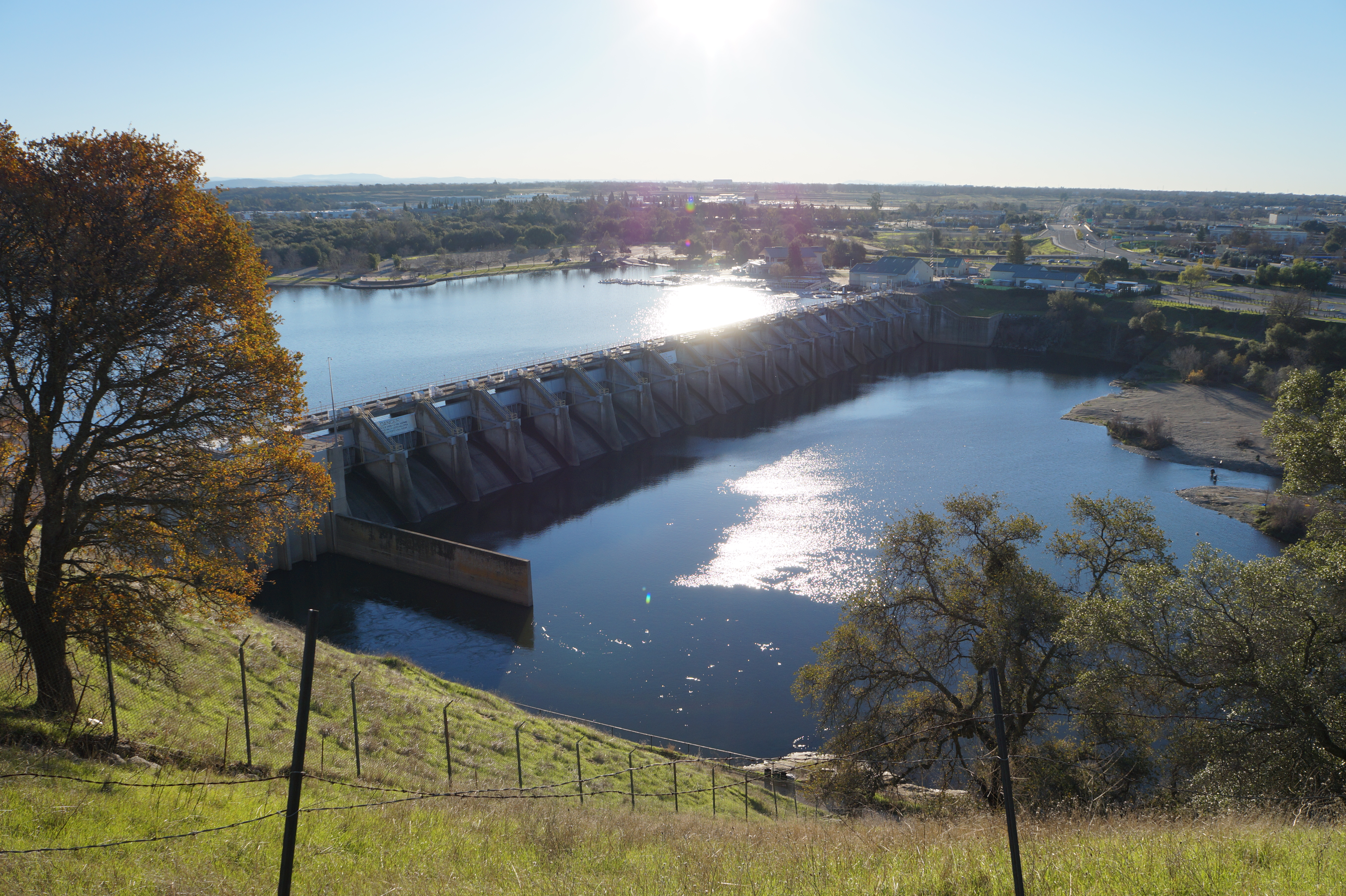
- Interactive map of Nimbus Dam
- Country: United States
- Location: Sacramento County, California
- Coordinates: 38.636095°N 121.219806°W
- Status: Operational
- Construction began: 1952; 74 years ago
- Opening date: 1955; 71 years ago
- Owner: Bureau of Reclamation

Dam and spillways
- Impounds: American River
- Height: 87 ft (27 m)
- Length: 1,093 ft (333 m)
- Elevation at crest: 132 ft (40 m)
- Width (crest): 28 ft (8.5 m)
- Width (base): 135 ft (41 m)
- Dam volume: 8,760 acre-feet (10,810 dam^{3})

Reservoir
- Creates: Lake Natoma
- Catchment area: 1,898 mi^{2} (4,920 km^{2})

Power Station
- Installed capacity: 13.5 MW
- Annual generation: 51,097,000 KWh
- Website https://www.usbr.gov/projects/index.php?id=222

The Nimbus Dam is a base load hydroelectric dam on the American River near Folsom, California. Approximately 8,700 acre-feet (10,700 dam^{3}) of water is retained by the dam. It is responsible for the impoundment of water from the American River to create the Lake Natoma reservoir. The dam stands 87 feet and spans 1,093 feet. The Nimbus powerplant consists of two generators. Each generator produces enough electrical power to power over 200,000 100-watt light bulbs, about 15,500 kilowatts of electrical power. Nimbus Dam consists of 18 radial gates, each with their own gate bays. These 18 gates today are the ones that were completed in 1955 along with the rest of the dam. Of the eighteen gates, four of them have had their coating system replaced. This protects the gates from a faster rate of corrosion. The other fourteen gates have the original coating.

As part of the Central Valley Project (CVP), a federal water project that provides irrigation and municipal water to much of California's Central Valley, it was authorized in 1949 as a regulating reservoir for Folsom Dam, and a diversion pool for the Folsom South Canal. Construction began in 1952, and it opened in 1955.

== The Nimbus Powerplant ==
The Nimbus Powerplant is located on the north side of the American River and on the left side of Nimbus Dam via looking east. The powerplant provides backup to the main powerplant that is located upstream at Folsom Dam. Each of the two generators contain approximately 7,700 kilowatts of electrical power. What drives the two generators through six penstocks, each about 47 feet long, are the two turbines with 9,400 horsepower. Water is supplied through these turbines. The Western Area Power Administration markets the power that is generated by the powerplants at Nimbus Dam and Folsom Dam.

The dam serves as a diversion to direct water into the Folsom South Canal, which carries water to an area approximately 10 miles northeast of the city of Lodi. The canal once provided cooling water for the SMUD nuclear power plant, Rancho Seco. Today, it continues to provide water for irrigation, water supply, and industrial purposes to its surrounding area.

== The Nimbus Dam Radial Gates Project ==
The United States Bureau of Reclamation released a final environmental assessment for the Nimbus Dam Radial Gates Maintenance Project in May 2015. This report laid out the purpose and need for the project, the details of what the construction would consist of, and the environmental impact of the project on existing federal wildlife protection acts. The report argues that over half the radial gates of Nimbus Dam need a new coating system, along with other repairs that fall outside of normal maintenance. No major work has been done to the gates since the construction of the dam in the 1950s. In 2014, the Bureau of Reclamation contributed an $11,141,820 contract for the construction. The project is expected to be completed by the end of 2019 and will focus on replacing the coating on the fourteen gates that have the original quoting. The project will also include the construction of a storage facility.

Along with laying out the plan for the project, managers were to abide by federal and state environmental regulations. In the writing of the final report for the maintenance project, the regulations that the project would abide by include the Fish and Wildlife Coordination Act, Endangered Species Act, Migratory Bird Treaty, executive orders for floodplain management and the protection of wetlands, Clean Air Act, and the Clean Water Act. Complying with these regulations means the project would be completed without significant environmental damage.

== Impact on Fish and Wildlife ==
The water in Lake Natoma, which is the lake created by Nimbus Dam, is too cold for warmwater production of fish, and never has the lake been a natural producer of fish. The rapid water exchange from Nimbus Dam sharply decreases the production of plankton, which inhibits trout growth. The Department of Fish and Game annually plants Lake Natoma with 20,000 to 30,000 catchable-sized trout. The water exchange in the lake during the summer season increases with the operation of the Auburn-Folsom South Project. This ultimately lowers water temperatures.

125 miles of habitat for Chinook and steelhead salmon were accessible in the American River Watershed before the construction of Nimbus Dam. When the dam was constructed in the 1950s, this habitat area was dramatically decreased in size, as the salmon were not able to pass through the dam. To make sure the salmon had a place to spawn, through the California Department of Fish and Game, the Bureau of Reclamation opened the Nimbus Fish Hatchery in 1958 downstream from Nimbus Dam. The purpose of the hatchery was to provide the salmon with an artificial spawning habitat before they are let back out into the wild.

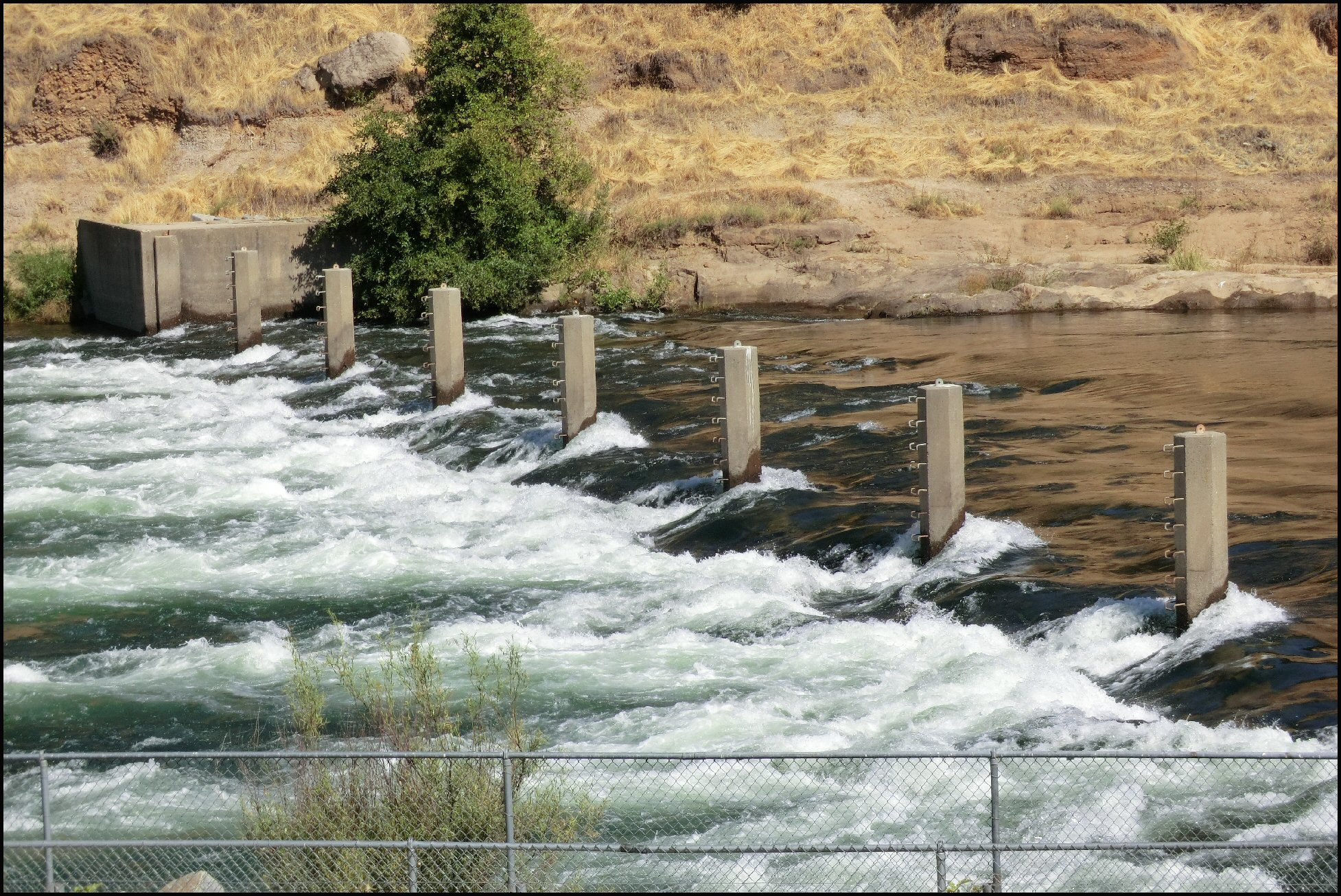
The fish weir downstream of the dam

Fishing has been a popular recreational use of the waters below Nimbus Dam since the Nimbus Fish Hatchery was built in 1958. However, the amount of fishing that was being done severely impacted the spawning locations of fish once passed the fish ladder at the hatchery. On March 1, 2018, the Nimbus Basin became permanently closed to all fishing. The closure of the basin is an effort to reorienting the fish ladder as part of the Nimbus Hatchery Fish Passage Project, which would create a system of collecting steelhead and adult salmon for the hatchery. The project would also include changes that would minimize flow fluctuations in the river associated with the weir of the hatchery, as well as eliminate safety concerns associated with the existing weir.

== Hydrology of the Lower American River and Water Quality ==
Nearly half of the annual precipitation in the Sacramento area occurs during a span of 60 days in the winter months, while during the summer, only about one percent of the annual precipitation falls. In the American River Basin, approximately 40% of the annual runoff is a result of melting snow in the Sierra Nevada Mountains. As a result, low natural flow rates in the American River system in the later summer months. As a result, the dam fluctuates water output throughout the year.

Due to the contamination of the groundwater because of environmental degradation in the lower American River, the County of Sacramento created a Water Forum in 1993. Working together with water managers from Eldorado and Placer Counties, the Forum plans to provide a clean and reliable supply of water to the region by 2030 and to protect the wildlife and fish in the Lower American River. Signed in April 2000, the Water Forum Agreement called for the implementation of increased surface water diversions, habitat management, water conservation, and an improved standard of flow

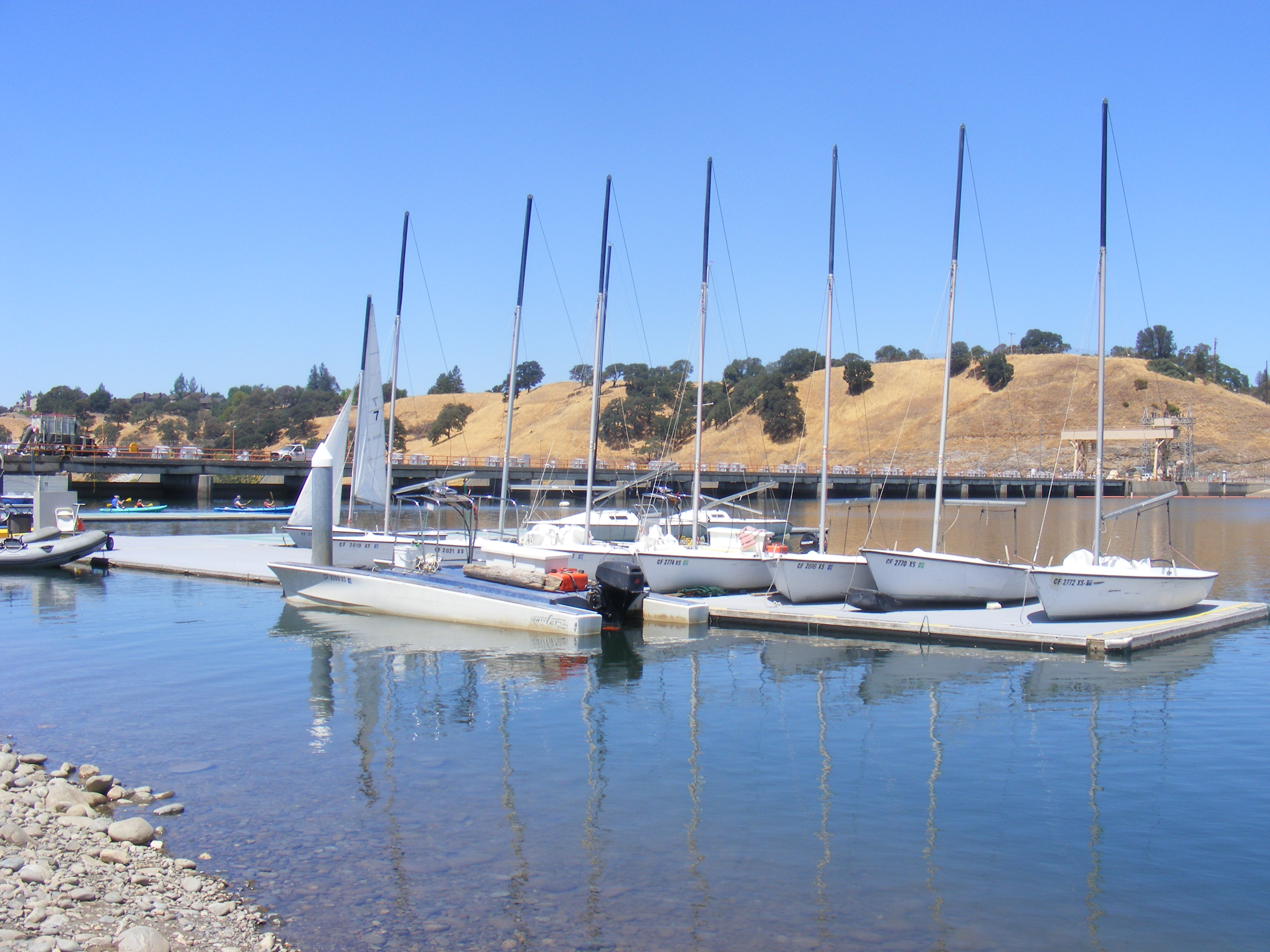
The Nimbus recreational area. The dam can be seen in the background.

== See also ==
- List of dams and reservoirs in California
