= Folsom Dam =

- Folsom Dam and auxiliary spillway
- Interactive map of Folsom Dam
- Location: Folsom, California
- Coordinates: 38.7077°N 121.1565°W
- Construction began: 1951; 75 years ago
- Opening date: 1956; 70 years ago
- Construction cost: US$81.5 million
- Operator: U.S. Bureau of Reclamation

Dam and spillways
- Impounds: American River
- Height: 340 ft (100 m)
- Length: 1,400 ft (430 m)

Reservoir
- Creates: Folsom Lake
- Total capacity: 977,000 acre⋅ft (1.205 km^{3})
- Inactive capacity: 83,000 acre⋅ft (0.102 km^{3})
- Catchment area: 1,875 mi^{2} (4,860 km^{2})
- Surface area: 11,930 acres (4,830 ha)

Power Station
- Commission date: 1955
- Hydraulic head: 300 ft (91 m) (rated)
- Turbines: 3x Francis
- Installed capacity: 198.7 MW
- Annual generation: 528,427,000 KWh (2001–2012)
- Website https://www.usbr.gov/projects/index.php?id=74

Folsom Dam is a concrete gravity dam on the American River of Northern California in the United States, about 25 mi (40 km) northeast of Sacramento. The dam is 340 ft (100 m) high and 1,400 ft (430 m) long, flanked by earthen wing dams. It was completed in 1955, and officially opened the following year.

Located at the junction of the north and south forks of the American River, the dam was built by the United States Army Corps of Engineers, and was transferred to the United States Bureau of Reclamation upon its completion. The dam and its reservoir, Folsom Lake, are part of the Central Valley Project, a multipurpose project that provides flood control, hydroelectricity, irrigation, and municipal water supply. To increase Sacramento's flood protection to 200-year flood protection (meaning that the area is protected from a flood that has a 0.5% chance of occurring in any given year), the Corps of Engineers recently constructed an auxiliary spillway, which was completed in October 2017; it enables Folsom Dam operators to increase outflows to prevent the lake level from reaching or exceeding the height of the main dam gates.

Another Central Valley Project dam, Nimbus Dam, is located further down river.

== Specifications ==
Folsom Dam is located just north of the city of Folsom, and consists of a 340-ft-high (100 m), 1,400-ft-long (430 m), hollow-core, concrete gravity dam containing 1,170,000 yd^{3} (890,000 m^{3}) of material. The dam is flanked by two earthen wing dikes, and the reservoir is held in place by an additional nine saddle dams on the west and southeast sides. The wing dams total a length of 8,800 ft (2,700 m), and the saddle dams measure 16,530 ft (5,040 m) long combined. The dam and appurtenant dikes total a length of 26,730 ft (8,150 m), more than 5 mi (8.0 km). Floodwaters are released by a spillway located on the main channel dam, controlled by eight radial gates with a capacity of 567,000 cu ft/s (16,100 m^{3}/s), as well as a set of outlet works with a capacity of 115,000 cu ft/s (3,300 m^{3}/s).

The impounded water behind the dam forms Folsom Lake, with a normal maximum pool of 977,000 acre⋅ft (1.205 km^{3}) and a surcharge capacity of 110,000 acre⋅ft (0.14 km^{3}), for a total capacity of 1,087,000 acre⋅ft (1.341 km^{3}). The original capacity was 1,010,000 acre-feet (1.25 km^{3}), but it has been reduced somewhat due to sedimentation. At its maximum elevation of 480 ft (150 m), the reservoir covers 11,930 acres (4,830 ha), with 75 mi (121 km) of shoreline. The dam and reservoir control runoff from an area of 1,875 mi^{2} (4,860 km^{2}), or 87.6% of the 2,140 mi^{2} (5,500 km^{2}) American River watershed. The average amount of runoff entering the reservoir is 2,700,000 acre-feet (3.3 km^{3}), forcing the release of 1,700,000 acre-feet (2.1 km^{3}) for flood control.

Folsom Power Plant is located on the north side of the river, at the base of the dam. It has three Francis turbines with a combined capacity of 198.72 megawatts (MW), uprated from its original capacity of 162 MW in 1972. The power plant's electricity production is intermediate, between peaking and base load. It generally operates during the day, when the demand and price for electricity is the highest. The plant produces an average of 691,358,000 kilowatt hours each year.

== History ==
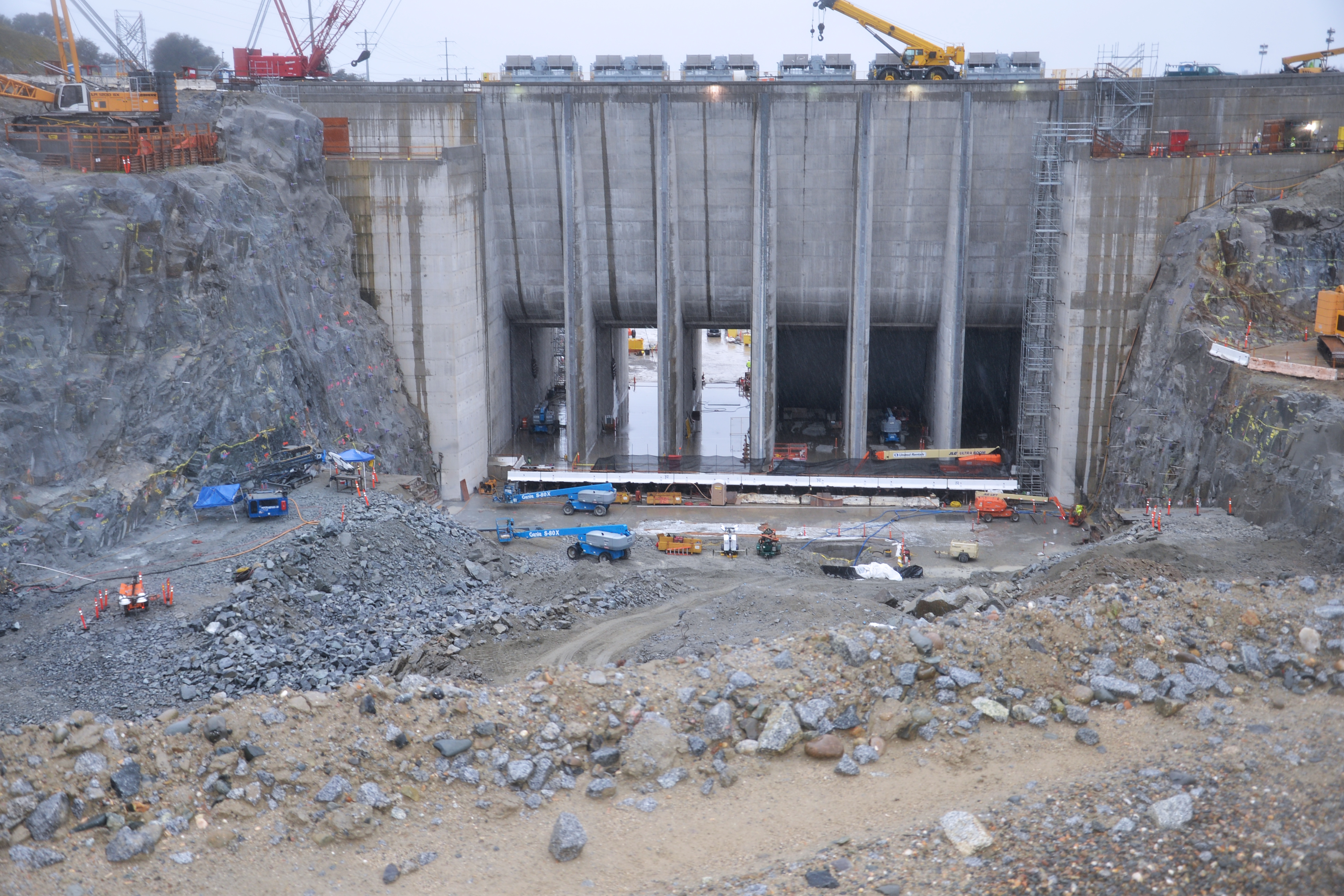
Folsom Dam auxiliary spillway construction

Folsom Dam was proposed as early as the 1930s under California's State Water Plan, in response to chronic flooding in low-lying Sacramento. The flood risk to the state capital had been exacerbated since the 1850s by hydraulic mining debris and the construction of levees to protect farms and towns, which reduced the channel capacity of the Sacramento and American Rivers. The current dam was originally authorized by Congress in 1944 as a 355,000 acre⋅ft (0.438 km^{3}) flood control unit, and was reauthorized in 1949 as a 1,000,000 acre⋅ft (1.2 km^{3}) multiple-purpose facility.

The current Folsom Dam replaced an earlier, smaller dam that had been completed in 1893 by Horatio Gates Livermore. The earlier dam had fed the Folsom Powerhouse, generating electricity that was transmitted to Sacramento over a 22 mi (35 km)-long distribution line, the longest electrical distribution system in the world at the time. The remains of the earlier dam can be seen downstream from the Folsom Lake Crossing.

Construction of the dam began in 1951 with preliminary excavations for the Folsom Power Plant. The primary contract was awarded to Savin Construction Corp. of East Hartford, Connecticut, and Merritt-Chapman & Scott of New York for $29.5 million, with oversight by the U.S. Army Corps of Engineers. On October 29, 1952, the first concrete was poured for the foundation. Flooding washed out the temporary cofferdam three times in 1953, delaying work and causing damage to Nimbus Dam which was also under construction at the time. Water storage in Folsom Lake began in February 1955, and the final concrete in the main dam was poured on May 17, 1955. The first hydroelectric power was generated in September of that year. In order to acquire the necessary land in the future Folsom Lake bed, the government had to relocate families on 142 properties, including the settlements of Mormon Island and Salmon Falls.

Even before the dam was complete, it demonstrated its effectiveness as a flood control facility during the record storms of December 1955, which completely filled Folsom Lake in a matter of weeks, and preventing $20 million of property damage. The dam was officially dedicated on May 5, 1956, and operation was transferred to the Bureau of Reclamation on May 14.

=== Spillway gate failure ===
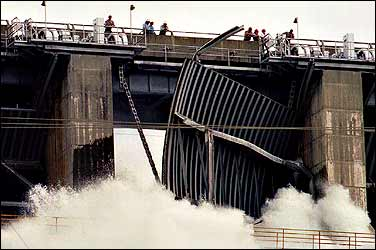
Spillway failure in 1995

On the morning of July 17, 1995, the Folsom Dam power plant was shut down and Spillway Gate 3 was opened to maintain flows in the American River. As the gate was operated, a diagonal brace between the lowest and second lowest struts failed. The failure resulted in the uncontrolled release of nearly 40% of Folsom Lake and a flood of 40,000 cubic feet per second (1,100 m^{3}/s) moving down the American River. The freshwater reaching San Francisco Bay was atypical for the summer season. This confused Pacific salmon and striped bass, whose instincts told them that fall rains had arrived, thus they began their annual fall migrations months ahead of schedule.

The hydraulic load on this type of spillway gate (Tainter gate) is transmitted from the cylindrical skin plate, which is in contact with the reservoir, through a number of struts to a convergence at the trunnion hub. The hub collects the load from the struts and transfers it across an interface to the trunnion pin, which is stationary and is connected to the dam. When the gate is operated, the hub rotates around the pin. The struts are primarily compression members, but friction at the pin-hub interface induces a bending stress during gate operation. Typically, and in this case, the struts are oriented such that the trunnion friction stress is applied to the weak axis of the struts (see Section modulus). To better handle these loads, the struts are connected with diagonal braces that take the stress as axial loads. At Folsom Dam, increasing corrosion at the pin-hub interface had raised the coefficient of friction and, therefore, the bending stress in the strut and the axial force in the brace. The capacity of the brace connection was exceeded and it failed. This caused the load to redistribute and the failure progressed, eventually buckling the struts.

After a year-long investigation, the Bureau of Reclamation attributed the failure to a design flaw: the Corps of Engineers, which designed the dam, did not consider trunnion friction (at the pin-hub interface) in the gate analyses. While this is true, this was one of five identical service gates that operated under the same circumstances for nearly 40 years without problems being observed. This suggests that the failure resulted from a condition that changed over time. Specifically, there was a gradual increase in the coefficient of friction at the pin-hub interface. While one would expect maintenance frequency to increase as a gate ages, Reclamation decreased the frequency of regular maintenance and lubrication over time due to budget constraints. In addition, the lubricant used by Reclamation did not conform to the Corps' original design specifications; it was a new, environmentally-friendly lubricant that was not sufficiently waterproof, allowing water to enter the pin-hub interface and cause the corrosion that resulted in increased friction.

This failure caused no fatalities.

== Safety ==
=== Security ===
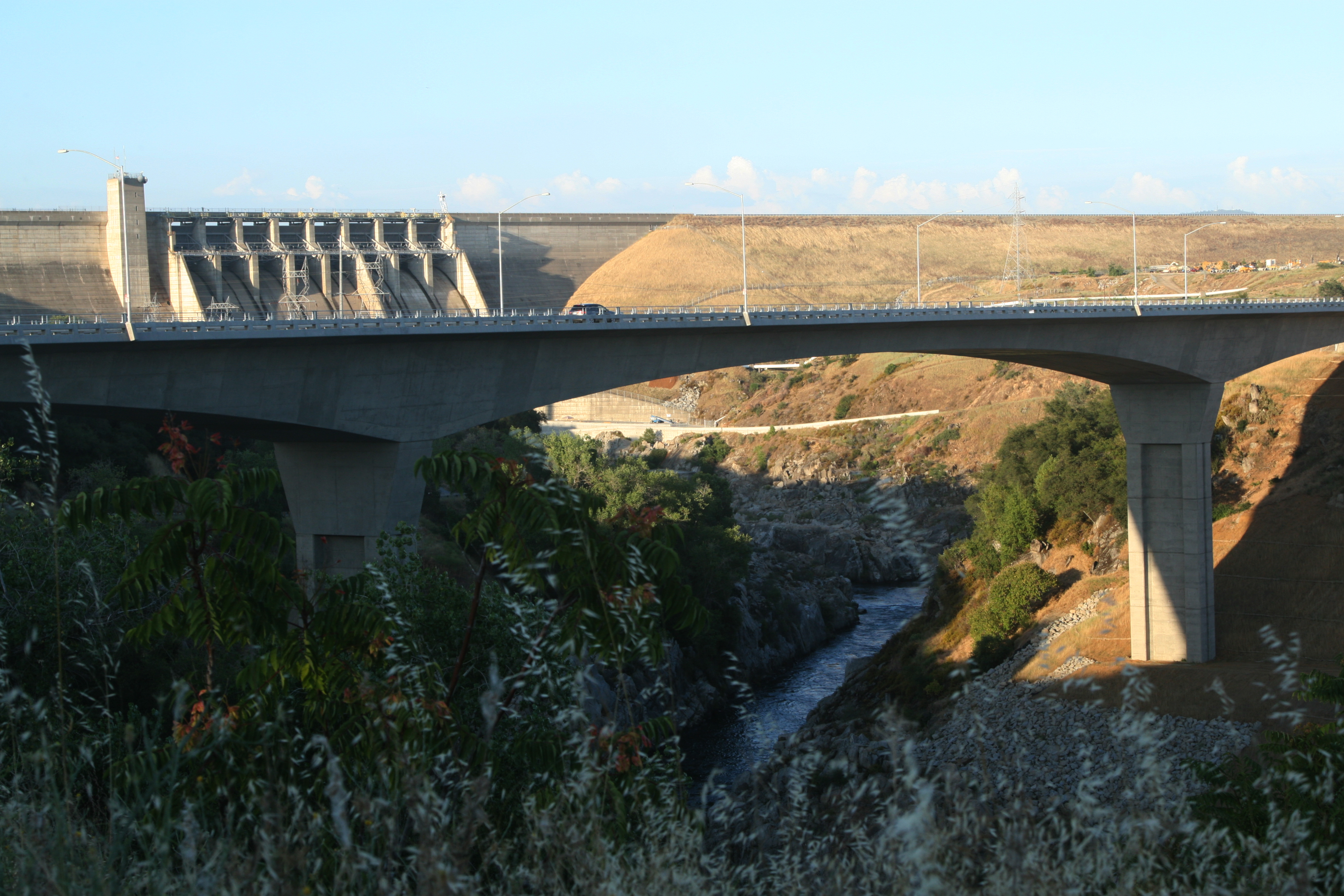
The new Folsom Lake Crossing bridge, built to bypass the dam, opened in March 2009

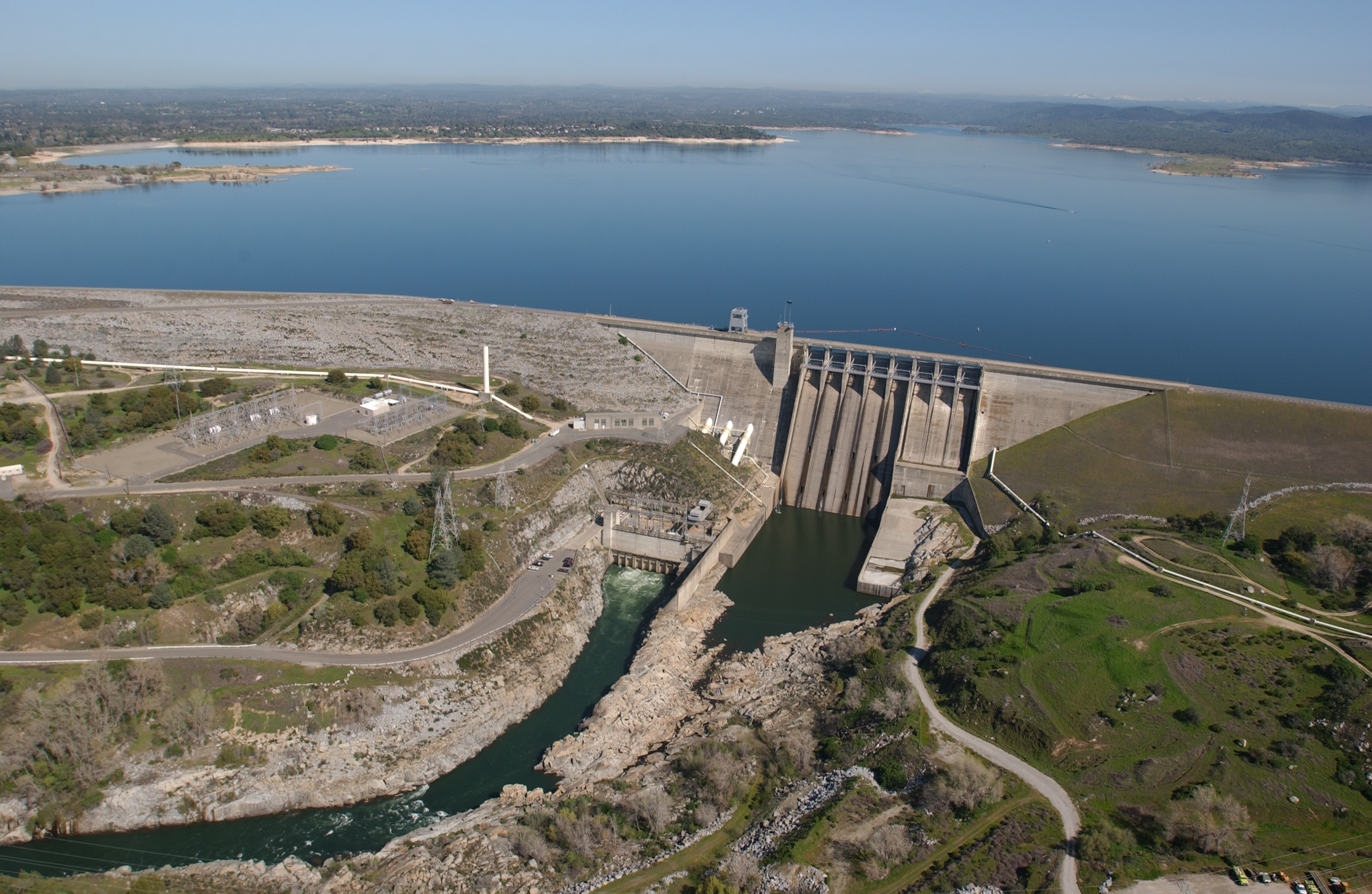
Folsom Dam and Lake, March 2004

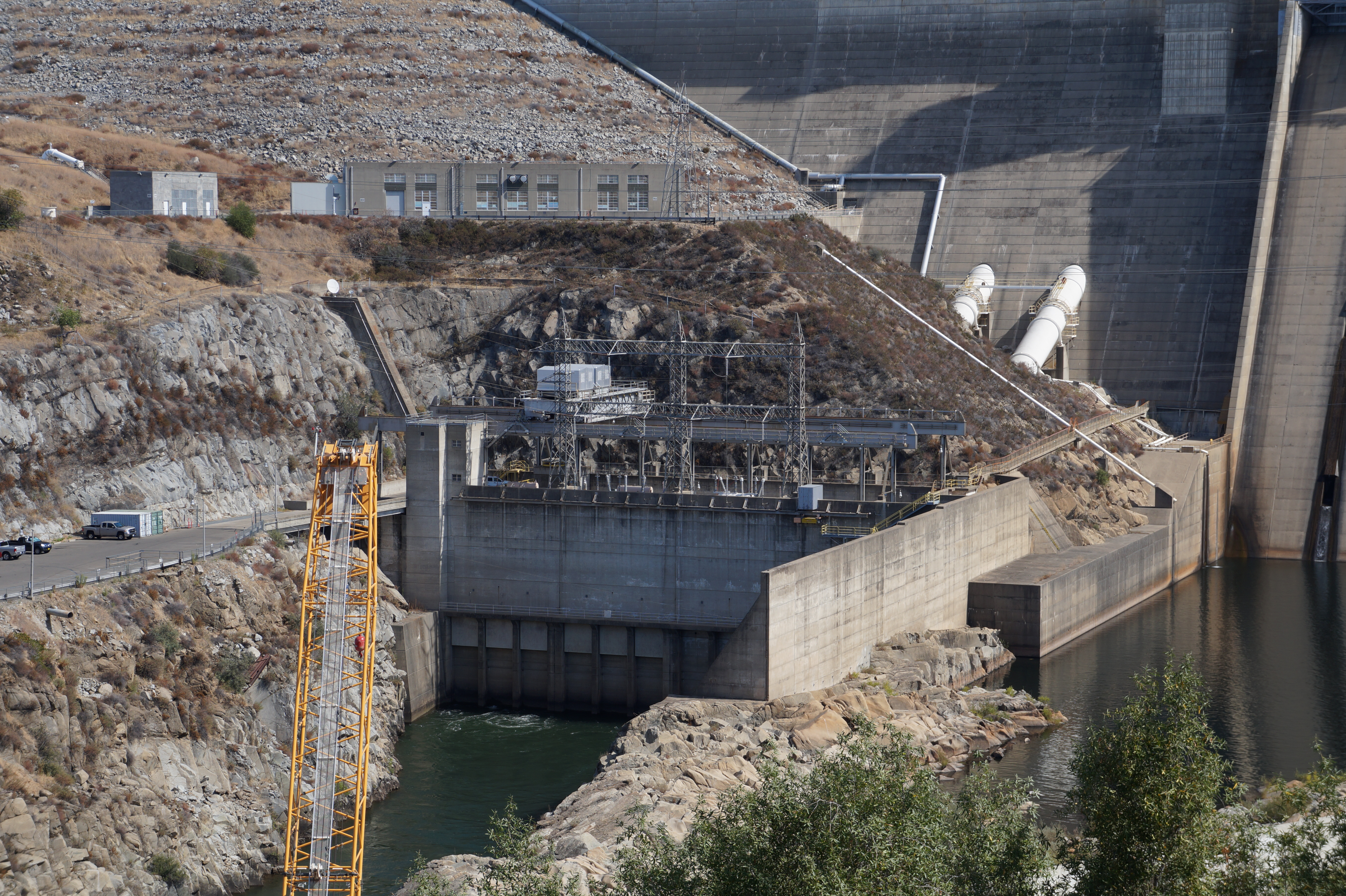
Folsom Dam Power Plant

After the 9/11 terrorist attacks, the Bureau of Reclamation analyzed potential targets for vulnerability and measures that could be taken to eliminate or reduce possible threats. With 500,000 residents in the vicinity of the Folsom Dam, the possibility of an attack on the dam was great enough concern for Bureau officials to close Folsom Dam Road. The road over the dam had been a major artery for the city of Folsom. With its closure, traffic became severely congested during rush hour. The impact was so great that residents and city officials petitioned the federal government to reconsider the road closure, which the government initially considered. Continued security concerns prevented them from re-opening the road and a new bridge, named Folsom Lake Crossing, was constructed and opened on March 28, 2009.

=== Flood risk ===
During a severe storm in December 1964, the inflow into Folsom Lake reached a record high of 280,000 cu ft (7,900 m^{3}) per second, with a river release of 115,000 cu ft (3,300 m^{3}) per second.

In February 1986, nearly 500,000 people faced the possibility of flooding when engineers at Folsom Dam were forced to open the spillway gates after heavy rains. The flooding was made worse by the failure of the Auburn Dam cofferdam upstream which released an extra 100,000 acre-feet (120,000,000 m^{3}) into the American River. A peak flow of 250,000 cubic feet per second (7,100 m^{3}/s) entered Folsom Lake, forcing operators at Folsom Dam to open all the spillway gates, releasing 130,000 cubic feet per second (3,700 m^{3}/s) into the American River. This was 15,000 cubic feet per second (420 m^{3}/s) above the safe capacity of downstream levees. Although the dam and the Sacramento levee system held without major damage, the requisite winter flood control space was increased 50%, from 400,000 to 600,000 acre feet, to protect against future floods. In addition, about 33,000 acre-feet (41,000,000 m^{3}) of sediment carried down from the mountains was deposited in Folsom Lake, considerably reducing its capacity. The consequence was a reduced capacity to store winter rainfall for summer use. Folsom Dam may have prevented as much as $4.7 billion in damages in 1986 alone.

The New Year's Day storm of 1997 was the most severe in recent history, with a total inflow of 1 million acre feet (equal to the entire capacity of Folsom Lake) over a 5-day period. However, this time the Bureau of Reclamation was able to limit releases to less than 110,000 cubic feet per second (3,100 m^{3}/s). The 1997 storm was a classic example of a "rain on snow" event, during which a warm tropical storm melted existing snowpack at lower and middle elevations, effectively doubling the volume of runoff. Prior to the New Year's storm, the winter of December 1996 had also been one of the wettest ever recorded, saturating the ground and depositing a considerable amount of snow.

The Bureau of Reclamation's Safety of Dams Program determined the risk of flooding in the Sacramento area, labelling it as one of the most at-risk communities in the United States.

Two projects to increase flood protection are currently underway. The first will raise the surrounding dikes by 7 feet (2.1 m) to increase flood protection. The second, a new spillway, is designed to handle the runoff from large storms and snowmelt floods that might cause damage in the region. The new spillway is built with gates 50 ft (15 m) lower than the existing spillway, allowing for more efficient evacuation of reservoir storage before flooding events.

== See also ==
- List of dams and reservoirs in California
- List of power stations in California
- List of the tallest dams in the United States
- List of United States Bureau of Reclamation dams
