= Middle Fork American River =

Tributary of a Northern California river

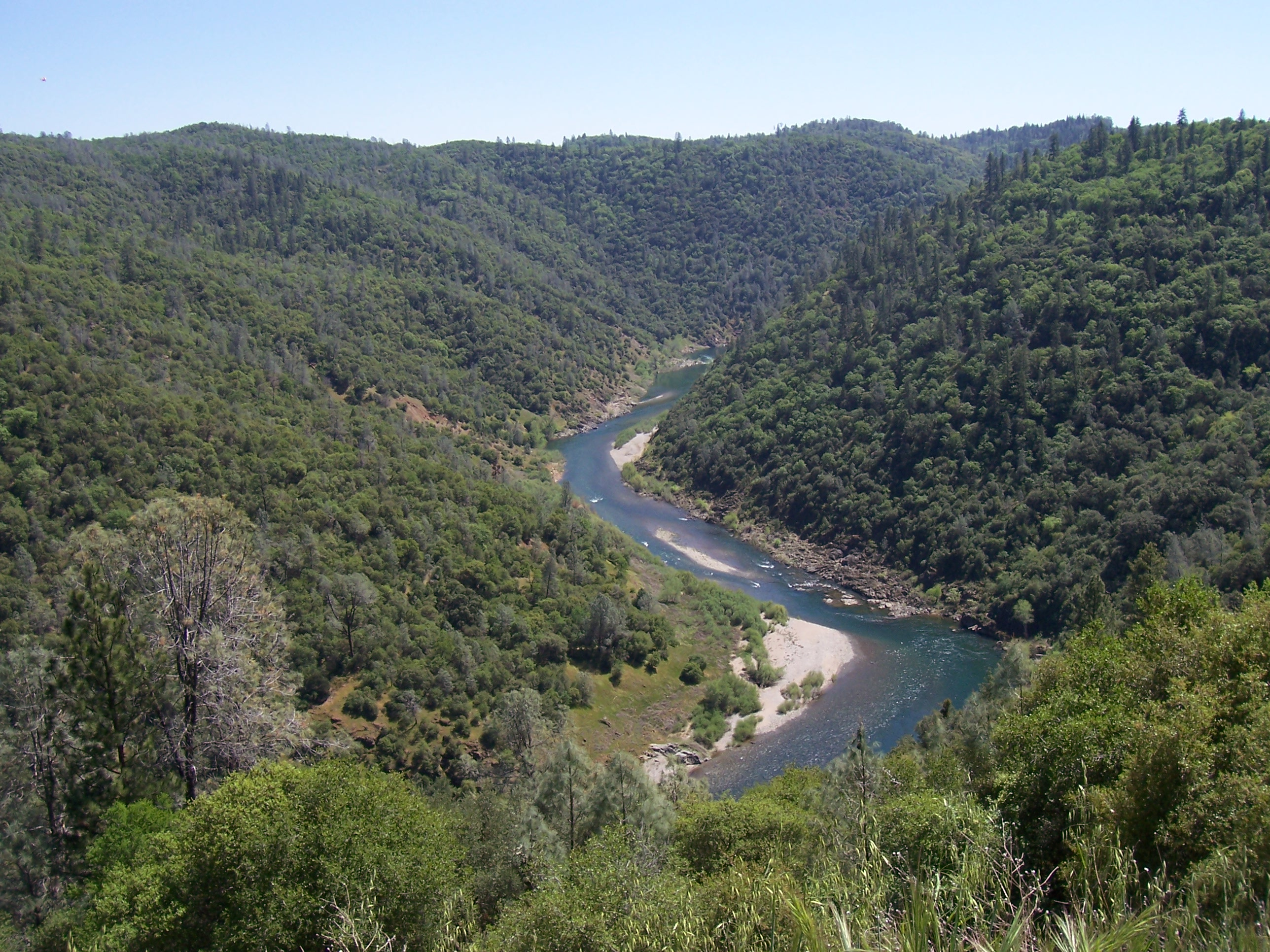
- Middle Fork flowing through the Auburn State Recreation Area

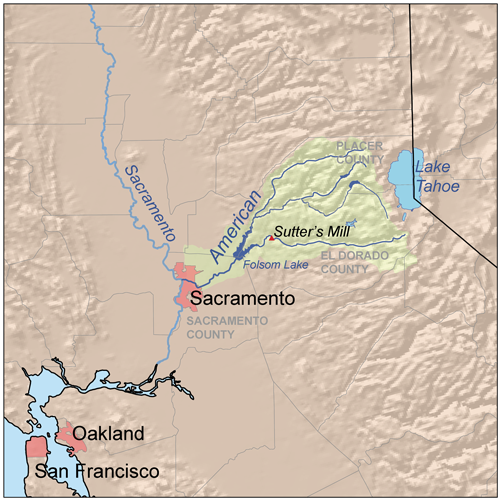
- Map of the American River drainage basin

Location
- Country: United States
- State: California

Physical characteristics
- Source: Granite Chief Wilderness
  - location: Placer County
  - coordinates: 39°11′39″N 120°16′49″W
  - elevation: 8,382 ft (2,555 m)
- Mouth: North Fork American River
  - location: near Auburn
  - coordinates: 38°54′55″N 121°02′14″W
  - elevation: 538 ft (164 m)
- Length: 62.3 mi (100.3 km)
- Basin size: 616 sq mi (1,600 km^{2})
- Discharge
  - location: near Auburn
  - average: 1,332 cu ft/s (37.7 m^{3}/s)
  - minimum: 23.2 cu ft/s (0.66 m^{3}/s)
  - maximum: 253,000 cu ft/s (7,200 m^{3}/s)

Basin features
- Tributaries
  - left: Rubicon River, Otter Creek, Canyon Creek
  - right: Duncan Creek, North Fork Middle Fork American River

The Middle Fork American River is one of three forks that form the American River in Northern California. It drains a large watershed in the high Sierra Nevada west of Lake Tahoe and northeast of Sacramento in Placer and El Dorado Counties, between the watersheds of the North Fork American River and South Fork American River. The Middle Fork joins with the North Fork near Auburn and they continue downstream to Folsom Lake as the North Fork, even though the Middle Fork carries a larger volume of water.

The Middle Fork was one of the richest gold mining areas during the California Gold Rush of the 1850s, and is still recreationally mined today. The river is dammed extensively to produce hydroelectricity and provide domestic water supply. Although long stretches of the Middle Fork have been dewatered by diversions, the portion of the river and canyon in the Auburn State Recreation Area is one of the state's most popular whitewater runs. Professional whitewater rafting companies offer guided trips on the Middle Fork American river from May to October. The Middle Fork canyon also has an extensive system of hiking and riding trails including the Western States Trail, which stretches 100 miles (160 km) from Auburn to Lake Tahoe.

== Course ==
The Middle Fork begins at an unnamed spring in the Granite Chief Wilderness, 8,382 ft (2,555 m) above sea level, in eastern Placer County, west of the Palisades Tahoe Ski Resort, and about 10 miles (16 km) west of Lake Tahoe. The headwaters are in a rugged granite basin fed by multiple streams including one flowing from Little Needle Lake. The river flows west, turning southwest where it receives Talbot Creek from the right, through the high mountain valley of French Meadows. Several campgrounds and numerous public trails are located along this upper reach of the river. About 12 miles (19 km) from its source, it enters French Meadows Reservoir, 5,223 ft (1,592 m) above sea level, formed by the rockfill L.L. Anderson Dam. Almost the entire flow of the river at this point is diverted for hydroelectric generation, to be returned much farther downstream, with the consequence that the river immediately below the dam is reduced to a trickle except during periods of heavy snowmelt.

Below Anderson Dam the Middle Fork begins to form the boundary between the Tahoe National Forest on the north and the Eldorado National Forest on the south, almost to its confluence with the North Fork. It turns south-southwest, flowing through an extremely steep canyon, descending about 1,600-foot (490 m) in 10 miles (16 km) to its confluence with Duncan Creek at 3,379 ft (1,030 m) above sea level. The Middle Fork's canyons, often exceeding 2,000 ft (610 m) in depth, are bounded by extensive high ridges on either side, with Red Star and Chipmunk Ridges to the north and south of the river, respectively, between French Meadows and Duncan Creek. From there downstream to the El Dorado County line the canyon is bounded by Mosquito Ridge to the north, and Ralston Ridge to the south.

At the confluence with Duncan Creek the Middle Fork begins to turn west, winding through its rugged canyon, and flows through the small Interbay Reservoir where more water is diverted for power generation. It receives Big Mosquito Creek from the right and makes a large bend around the north side of Tanner Point. The Middle Fork continues west towards the western end of Ralston Ridge, north of Balderson Station, where it is joined by its largest tributary, the Rubicon River. The Rubicon is significantly longer than the Middle Fork above their confluence, and its drainage basin is also larger, extending to the Desolation Wilderness and draining a large part of northern El Dorado County. Like the upper Middle Fork, the Rubicon is almost entirely diverted for power generation. The diverted water is returned to the Middle Fork at Ralston Afterbay (Oxbow Reservoir), located directly below the confluence of the Middle Fork and Rubicon River at an elevation of 1,168 ft (356 m).

A short distance below the dam the Middle Fork is joined by its second largest tributary, the North Fork Middle Fork American River, which drains an extensive area along the Forest Hill Divide, though lower in elevation than the upper Middle Fork or Rubicon Rivers. The North Fork Middle Fork is free-flowing with no significant dams or diversions. Just downstream, the Middle Fork flows through Tunnel Chute, where the river races through a man-made tunnel blasted out during the California Gold Rush, in order to dewater part of the river bed for mining. The Middle Fork delineates the Placer County (north)–El Dorado County line from Oxbow Dam all the way until its confluence with the North Fork.

Near Foresthill the Middle Fork leaves the western boundary of the Tahoe/Eldorado National Forests and enters the Auburn State Recreation Area in the foothills of the Sierra Nevada. Its canyon is wider, less steep, and heavily forested, with depths of 1,000 to 1,500 ft (300 to 460 m) from rim to river. It receives numerous smaller creeks and canyons including Volcano Canyon from the north near Foresthill, and Otter Creek and Canyon Creek from the south near Georgetown. Although the river has a lower gradient in the foothills, its most dangerous rapid is located here at Ruck-A-Chucky Falls just north of Greenwood. Below Ruck-A-Chucky the Middle Fork makes an abrupt southward jog before turning west-southwest again, joining the North Fork at "The Confluence" at an elevation of 538 ft (164 m). The Confluence is just east of Auburn, directly upstream of Highway 49 and below the Foresthill Bridge.

== Watershed ==
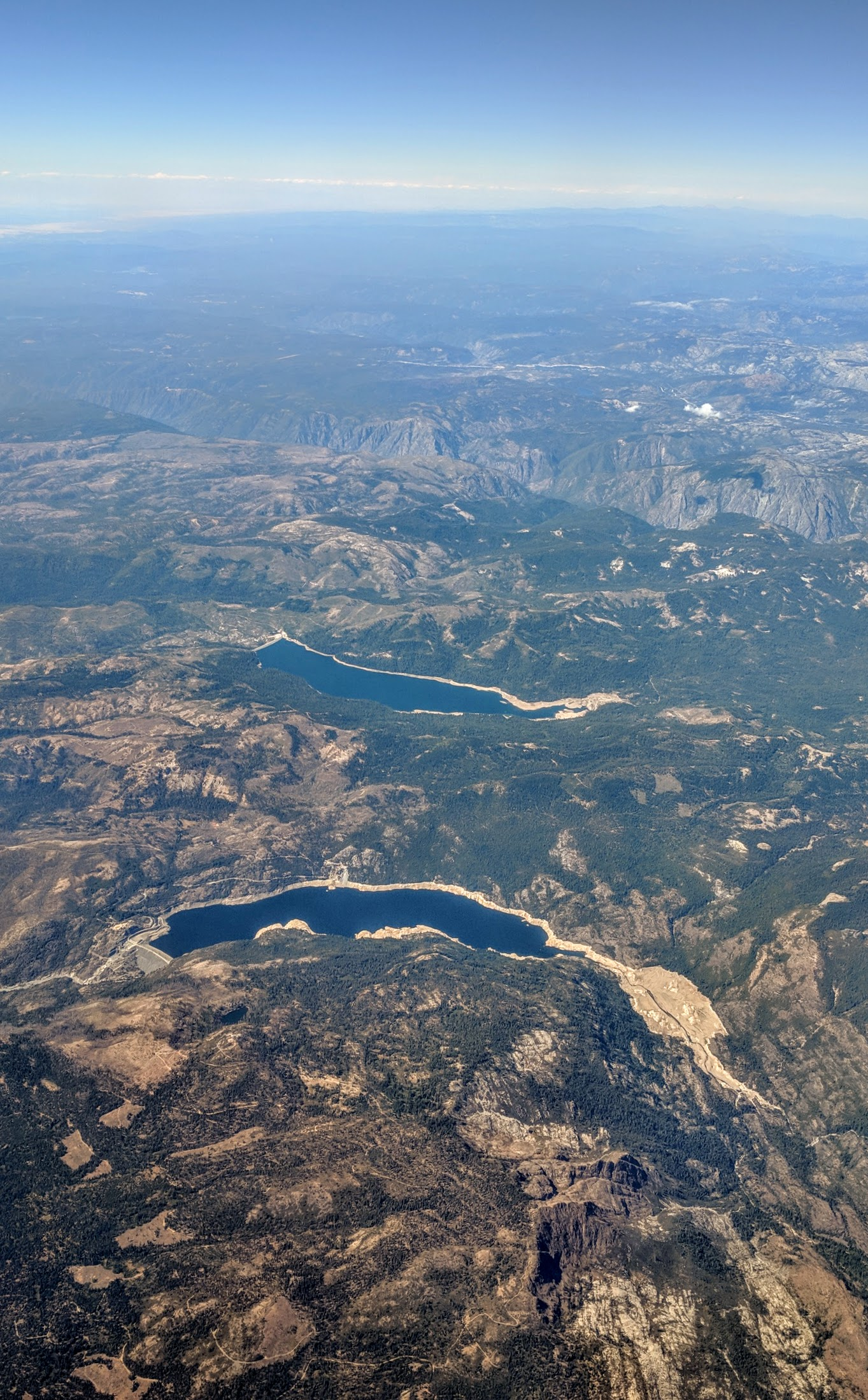
Aerial view of the upper Middle Fork watershed, showing French Meadows (far) and Hell Hole reservoirs on the Middle Fork and Rubicon Rivers

The Middle Fork American River watershed encompasses 616 square miles (1,600 km^{2}), which represents about 33 percent of the total American River drainage basin above Folsom Lake. The Rubicon River is the largest tributary watershed, at 315.4 mi^{2} (817 km^{2}), which is nearly three times the size of the Middle Fork's own drainage area above their confluence. Almost the entire watershed is forested, with the exception of the alpine zone at the highest elevations near the Sierra Crest, and some areas of grassland, range and shrub in the foothills.

Elevations range from 538 ft (164 m) at the river's mouth to over 9,900 ft (3,000 m) at the headwaters of the Rubicon River. More than half of the watershed is 5,000 ft (1,500 m) or more above sea level. The terrain is extremely rugged, with many areas of thin, rocky soils that pose a high erosion hazard. Drainage generally occurs in a southwesterly direction between a series of long parallel ridges. With the Forest Hill Divide forming the northern boundary of the watershed, the major ridges heading south are Deadwood, Mosquito, Red Star, Ralston/Chipmunk and Nevada Point Ridges. The sole exception to this drainage pattern is the headwaters of the Rubicon River, which flow in a northwesterly direction before turning southwest.

The watershed is sparsely populated. The largest communities are Georgetown and Foresthill, which respectively had populations of 2,367 and 1,483 as of the 2010 census. There is also a number of smaller unincorporated communities including Todd Valley, Michigan Bluff, and Volcanoville, all of which began life as mining camps during the Gold Rush. The largest nearby city is Auburn, which with about 13,000 people is one of the northeasternmost communities in the Sacramento metropolitan area. About 75 percent of the watershed is managed by the U.S. Forest Service, with the balance split between the U.S. Bureau of Land Management, the state of California, and private landowners. In the lower part of the watershed, below the confluence with the Rubicon River, about half of the land is privately owned, with rural residential and some logging as the major uses.

The Middle Fork is one of the highest precipitation watersheds on the western slope of the Sierra Nevada, with an annual average of 50 inches (1,300 mm) with a range of 40 to 70 inches (1,000 to 1,800 mm) from the foothills to the mountains. Since the area experiences a Mediterranean climate, most of the precipitation occurs between November and March. At elevations higher than 5,000 ft (1,500 m), most precipitation falls as snow; elevations higher than 6,000 ft (1,800 m) are often covered in snow until late May or early June. Flows in the upper Middle Fork and Rubicon Rivers are dominated by snowmelt; the North Fork Middle Fork is equally affected by snowmelt and rainfall, and tributaries of the lower Middle Fork depend mostly on rainfall.

Water flow in the Middle Fork has been extensively modified by dams and diversions, with late spring-early summer high flows stored in reservoirs to generate hydropower later in the year when natural runoff is at its lowest. The impact on the annual hydrograph is shown in the below charts (French Meadows and Hell Hole reservoirs were created in 1964 and 1996, respectively):

Middle Fork monthly mean discharge at Auburn, 1911–1966 (cfs)

Middle Fork monthly mean discharge at Auburn, 1966–1986 (cfs)

== Ecology ==
The Middle Fork watershed contains numerous distinct plant communities. A study conducted by the Middle Fork of the American River Restoration Project (2011) identified five forest types in the upper Middle Fork and the North Fork Middle Fork watersheds. Mixed conifer forests, consisting mainly of ponderosa pine, sugar pine, Jeffrey pine, incense-cedar, white fir, Douglas fir, black oak and interior live oak, encompass 51 percent of this area, mostly at elevations below 5,000 feet (1,500 m). Some of this area is considered hardwood-conifer forests, which are dominated by oaks with more dispersed stands of conifers. White fir forests are the second largest group, comprising about 22 percent of the total area. Red fir forests, encompassing about 13 percent of the total, are found mostly at higher elevations. At lower elevations, hardwood forests cover about 11 percent of the watershed, mostly on hillsides and in canyons. Certain south-facing slopes at lower elevations are dominated by chaparral and to a lesser extent, grasslands. The Placer County Grove, located just northwest of the Middle Fork/Duncan Creek confluence, is the northernmost and most isolated grove of giant sequoias in California. It contains six trees, believed to range from 1,000 to 2,000 years old; the Joffre Tree is the tallest, standing 250 feet (76 m) high.

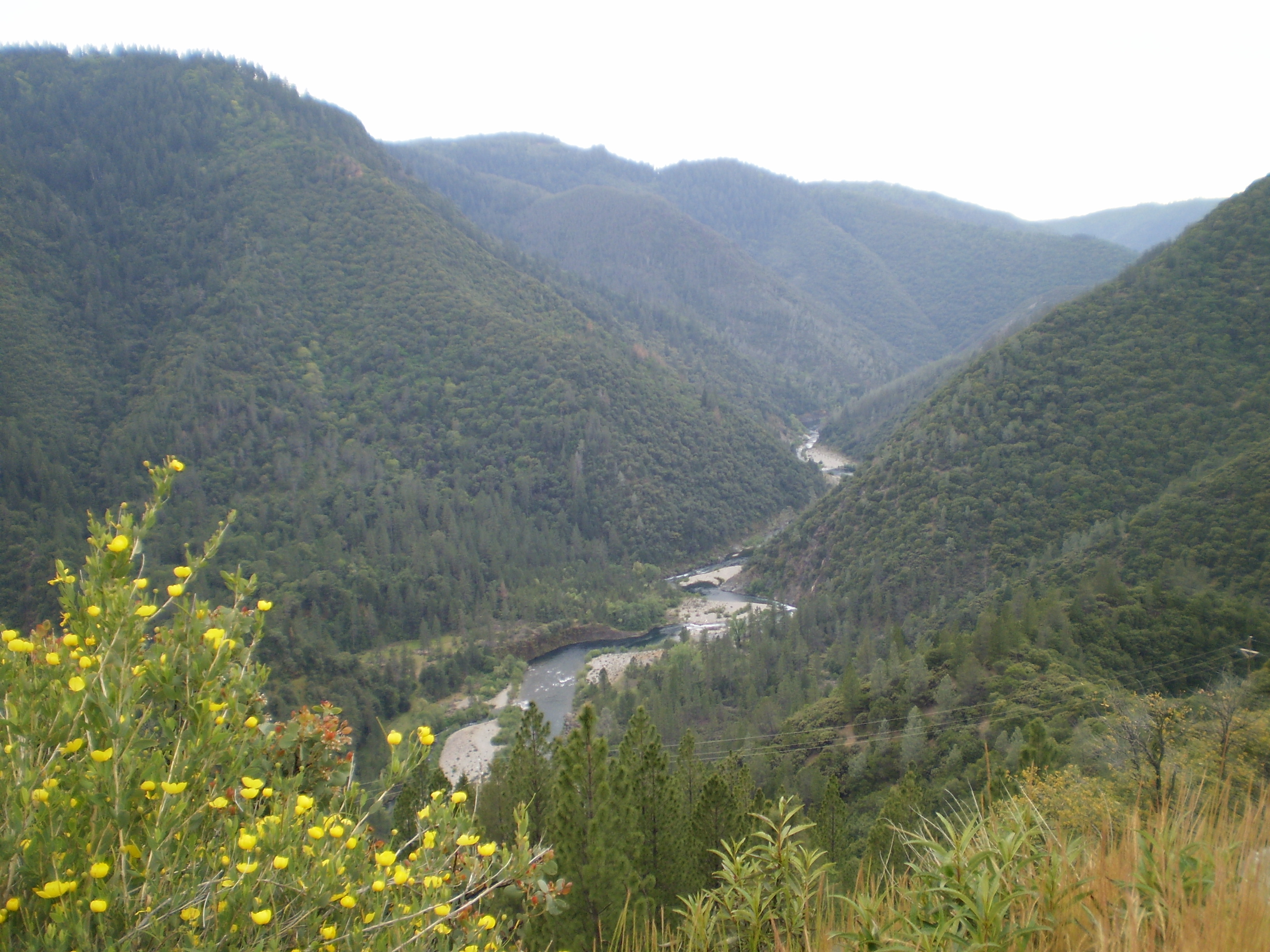
Mixed conifer and hardwood forest along the Middle Fork near Oxbow Reservoir

Due to fire suppression since the beginning of the 20th century, white fir has become more prevalent in the mixed-conifer forests while some pines, especially yellow pine and sugar pine, have declined significantly. Fuel loading in forests has increased due to interruption of the natural fire cycle, leading to an increase in the number and intensity of fires in recent decades. Plant communities in the Middle Fork have also been impacted by grazing, mining, road construction, selection cutting of larger trees, and other human activities.

Riparian habitat along the Middle Fork is limited due to the rocky substrate, heavy sedimentation, and frequent flooding that scours the river channel; however, many smaller tributaries host healthy riparian zones. Except for the headwaters, the Middle Fork is generally a wide, gravel-bedded stream with a pool and riffle morphology. Water quality in the Middle Fork is considered fair to good, but fish spawning habitat has been reduced by the construction of dams and water diversion for hydropower.

The Middle Fork is home to many fish species; rainbow trout, brown trout, Sacramento sucker, and Sacramento pikeminnow are found along the length of the river, and smallmouth bass are present in most of the major reservoirs and lakes. Fish found only in the lower elevations of the river include hardhead, riffle sculpin, and prickly sculpin. At higher elevations, brook trout are found; cutthroat trout, lake trout and kokanee salmon also live at higher elevations but have only been reported in Hell Hole Reservoir and the Rubicon River upstream of there.

Various other wildlife species are found along the Middle Fork including deer, black bears, mountain lions, bobcats, river otters, golden eagles, and bald eagles. More than 20 endangered, threatened or sensitive wildlife species have been found in the watershed, including the Sierra Nevada yellow-legged frog, California red-legged frog and California spotted owl.

== Human history ==
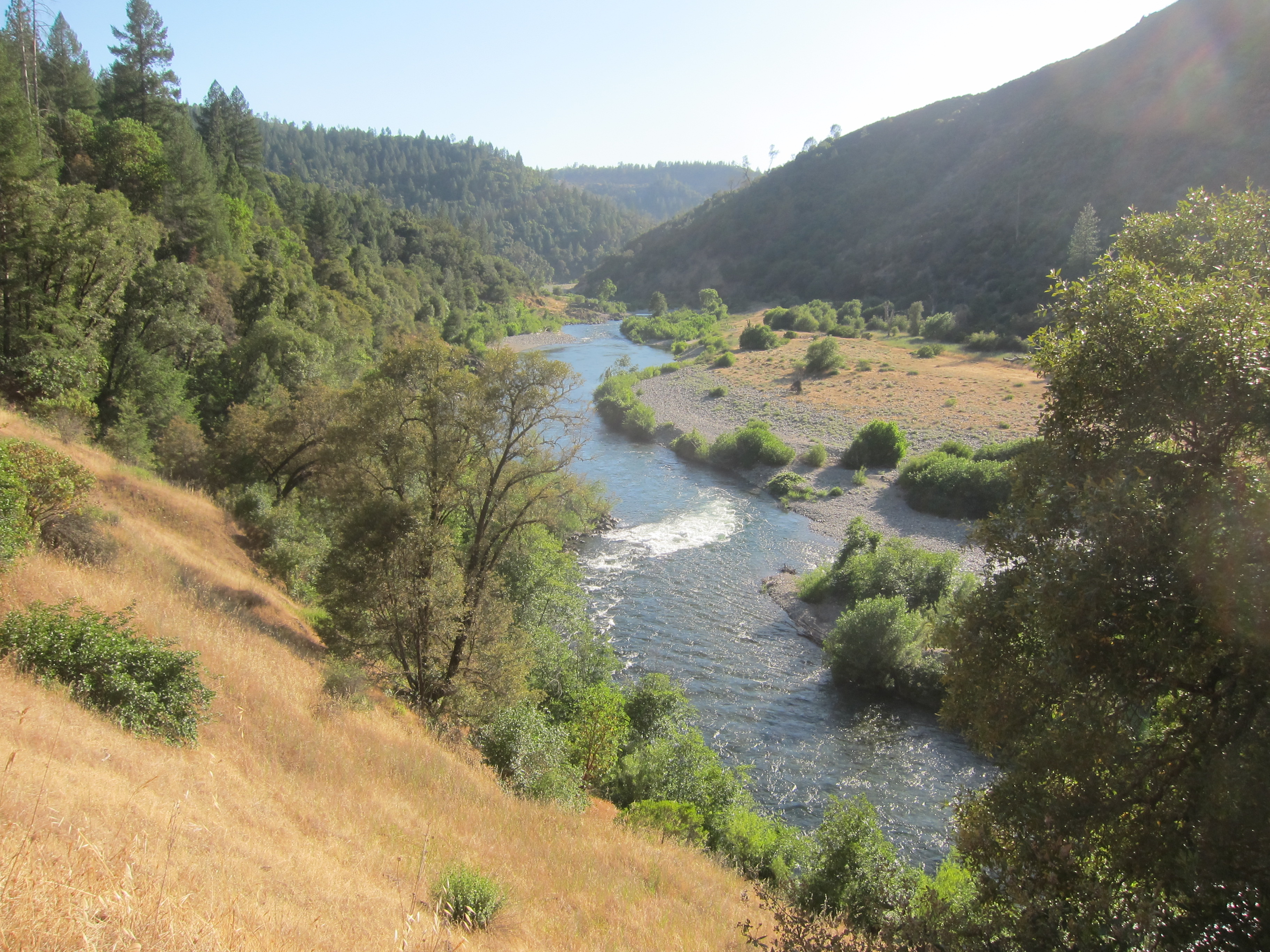
The Middle Fork near Browns Bar, in the Auburn State Recreation Area

The Middle Fork canyon was originally inhabited by the Nisenan people, whose territory extended over much of the American and lower Feather River watersheds from the east bank of the Sacramento River, high into the western Sierra Nevada. The Washoe people lived east of the Sierra Crest but sometimes ventured into the high elevations of the Middle Fork and its tributaries to hunt in summer. The Nisenan had permanent settlements on the ridges above the Middle Fork below 3,500-foot (1,100 m) in elevation, especially along the Forest Hill and Georgetown Divides. Plant resources were gathered at lower elevations, with the primary staple being black oak acorns, but many native varieties of grasses, roots, herbs, seeds and berries were also used. Prescribed burns were used to clear brush and improve conditions for hunting game and oak growth. The Middle Fork and Rubicon River canyons provided the main route of travel during the summer hunting season in the high Sierra. In addition to game such as deer, quail and rabbits, the rivers were a major food source, with salmon migrations in the spring and fall.

Although the Spanish began exploring California in the 1700s, it was probably not until Jedediah Smith's expedition in 1827 that Europeans entered the vicinity of the upper American River watershed. Smith's party searched, unsuccessfully, for a way to cross the Sierra Nevada via the American River, though they later did cross the Sierra Nevada via Ebbetts Pass becoming the first non-natives to do so. After the discovery of gold on the South Fork American River at Coloma in 1848, miners soon flocked to the Middle and North Forks as well. Less than two years later, nearly 10,000 miners had staked claims on the Middle Fork, with some of the richest sites including Ford's Bar, Maine Bar, Murderer's Bar and Spanish Bar. During the 1850s, the "Grand Flume" was built along the Middle Fork from Oregon Bar to Mammoth Bar, dewatering a 6-mile (9.7 km) section of the river bed so it could be turned over for gold. North of the Middle Fork, the Michigan Bluff to Last Chance Trail – one of only a few "toll trails" in the state – was constructed and used by pack trains of mules carrying supplies to Michigan Bluff, Deadwood and Last Chance.

In 1850, miners blasted a tunnel through a ridge, diverting the Middle Fork away from the long oxbow of Horseshoe Bar and allowing the river bed to be mined for gold. This was the first mining tunnel driven in California. Over time, the river downcut its own bed, exposing a bedrock ledge that blocked the flow of water through the tunnel and reestablished its course through the oxbow. In order to force the river back into the tunnel, a narrow channel was blasted through the ledge, creating the formidable rapid known today as Tunnel Chute. Horseshoe Bar turned out to be one of the richest gold deposits in the Middle Fork with $2.5 million of gold taken out from just 1.5 miles (2.4 km) of river bed. Overall, the Middle Fork was one of the richest gold-bearing streams in the Mother Lode. An 1890 report estimated an average take of $1 million of placer gold per mile from the Middle Fork between 1849 and 1863. The Middle Fork continued producing large amounts of placer gold into the 1880s, more than 20 years after most nearby streams had been exhausted.

Prospectors exploring the side canyons of the Middle Fork soon discovered that the auriferous (gold-bearing) gravels originated from strata about 2,000 ft (610 m) above the river. These auriferous gravels are actually ancient river beds, which over millions of years were eroded away resulting in the placer gold deposits of the modern river. Hydraulic mining and hard-rock mining operations soon spread along the Middle Fork canyon; Georgetown, established in 1849 on the divide south of the river, became the hub of this mining district. Because operations in Georgetown and other camps along the various divides were so high above the river, they could not use water from the Middle Fork, so extensive flume and ditch systems were constructed to bring water from tributaries. The California Water Company operated numerous hydraulic mines along the Georgetown Divide and by 1874 owned 300 miles (480 km) of ditches, flumes and pipes. Much of this water came from Pilot Creek, a tributary of the Rubicon River. Although many of these ditches fell into disuse after the Gold Rush, some remain in use as irrigation systems, while others have been converted to hiking or horse trails.

Mining had a significant environmental impact on the Middle Fork and beyond, as entire hillsides loosened by hydraulic operations sloughed down into the river and were carried into the Sacramento Valley during winter floods. The damage to navigation and flood control was such that the state legislature banned hydraulic mining in 1884, but even then the sediment continued to flow. A debris dam to contain sediment on the Middle Fork was first contemplated in 1891. By 1900, an estimated 10 to 15 million cubic yards (7.6–11.5 million m^{3}) of sediment had accumulated in the Middle Fork, although this represented only a fraction of the total since much of it has already been washed downstream in the preceding decades. In 1935 the U.S. Army Corps of Engineers was authorized to construct several dams in the American River basin to trap sediment. The North Fork was dammed in 1938–39 to form Lake Clementine. Nearby on the Middle Fork, the Army Corps began construction on the Ruck-a-Chucky dam, but work was stopped in 1940 due to landslides at the dam site. The diversion of Army resources at the onset of World War II postponed this project indefinitely.

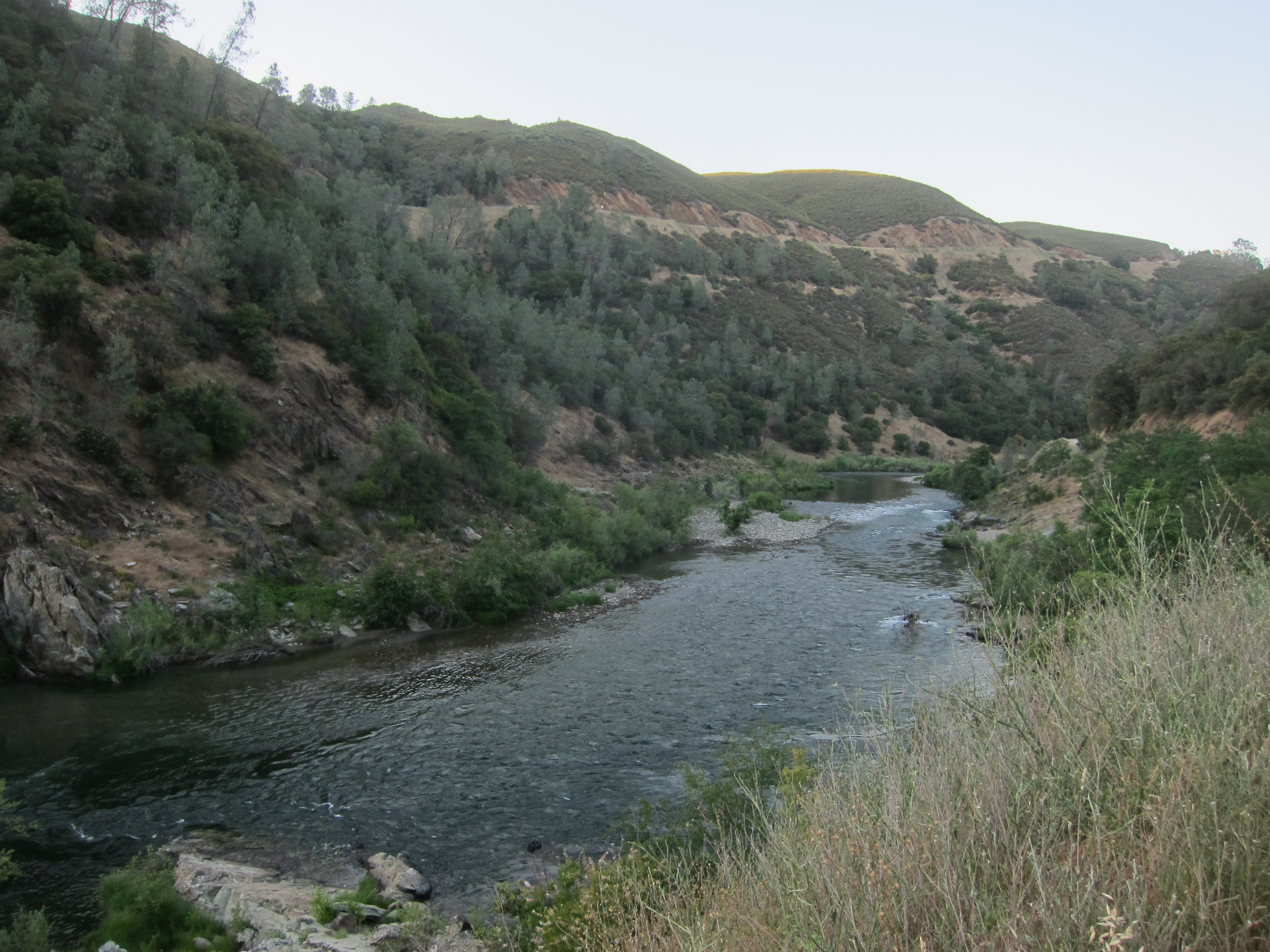
The Middle Fork near Hawver Cave and the old Mountain Quarries Railroad

In 1906 John C. Hawver, an Auburn dentist, discovered large limestone caverns along the lower Middle Fork canyon north of Cool at a height of some 700 feet (210 m) above the river. Some 400 specimens were removed from the site, including fossils of saber-toothed tigers, mastodons, and giant ground sloths, as well as Ice Age-era human remains. Many of these specimens are now stored at the University of California, Berkeley. By 1912 the Pacific Portland Cement Company was operating a limestone quarry near the site. The 7-mile (11 km) Mountain Quarries Railroad was run through the lower Middle Fork and North Fork canyons, connecting with the Southern Pacific main line south of Auburn. In order to allow freight trains access to the quarry itself, a tunnel was excavated underneath the cave system near river level; the cave itself was left undisturbed. The railroad was abandoned in 1939 though most of its alignment, including the well known Mountain Quarries Bridge ("No Hands Bridge") just downstream of the Middle Fork-North Fork confluence, remains as part of the Western States Trail. In the early 2000s, Hawver Cave was blocked off indefinitely by county officials after persistent vandalism.

In 1863 William Brewer had crossed the Sierra Nevada via the Middle Fork and Squaw Valley, accomplishing what Jedediah Smith had failed to do almost 40 years earlier. The old Native American trail Brewer had followed was subsequently used by some miners during the silver boom in Nevada, but due to its ruggedness and lack of water along much of the route, it failed to become a major crossing of the Sierra Nevada. This route, which in its section incorporated the Michigan Bluff to Last Chance Trail, an abandoned mining ditch grade between Georgetown and Auburn, as well as the Mountain Quarries Railroad grade, came to be known as the Western States Trail. The 100-mile (160 km) long trail gained renewed attention in 1955 when Wendell T. Robie and several companions rode its entire length from Squaw Valley to Auburn in one day. Robie was a founder of the Western States Trail Ride, now known popularly as the Tevis Cup, an annual endurance ride along this course. Part of the trail in the Auburn State Recreation Area has been named the Wendell T. Robie Trail. In 1974, Gordon Ainsleigh ran the course in 24 hours, and the first Western States Endurance Run was held in 1977.

The Middle Fork Project (detailed in the next section) was constructed by the Placer County Water Agency for water supply and hydropower generation, after receiving approval from the Federal Power Commission in 1963. L.L. Anderson (French Meadows) Dam, completed in December 1964, was the first major structure to be built. Hell Hole Dam on the Rubicon River was still under construction at that time when massive flooding struck northern California. More than 22 inches (560 mm) of rain fell within five days. On December 23 the incomplete dam was overtopped and destroyed, and a 60-foot (18 m) wall of water swept down the Rubicon, lower Middle Fork, and lower North Fork canyons, triggering landslides, uprooting trees, and obliterating any buildings and bridges along its path. However, since there were no permanent residences in the canyon, there was no loss of human life, and the floodwaters were contained by Folsom Lake, sparing the city of Sacramento from damage. The flood surge of 260,000 cubic feet per second (7,400 m^{3}/s) may have exceeded in magnitude any natural flood since the Pleistocene. The dam was rebuilt and completed in 1966.

In 1965 the U.S. Bureau of Reclamation was authorized to construct the Auburn Dam, which would have backed water up the North and Middle Forks for some 40 miles (64 km), flooding most of what is now the Auburn State Recreation Area. It would have inundated numerous features along the Middle Fork including parts of the Western States Trail, American Canyon, the Mammoth Bar OHV area, and Ruck-a-Chucky Falls. During preliminary work on the dam, a unique curved cable-stayed bridge was proposed to span the Middle Fork arm of the reservoir at Ruck-a-Chucky. Rather than using support piers, the bridge cables would have been anchored directly to bolts in the canyon walls. Due to concerns about earthquake safety and strong public opposition, Auburn Dam was never completed, and the bridge project ended with it.

== River modifications ==
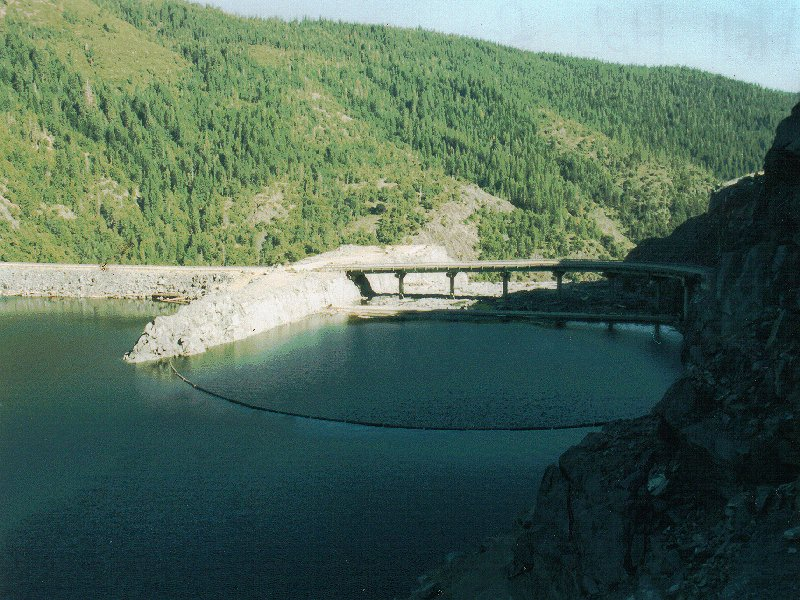
Hell Hole Dam on the Rubicon River

The Middle Fork is dammed in its upper reaches by the Middle Fork Project, operated by the Placer County Water Agency (PCWA) to provide domestic water supply and power for communities including Auburn and Roseville. The project generates an average of 1,030,000 megawatt hours (MWh) (3708 TJ) annually, utilizing 452,000 acre-feet (558,000 ML) from the Middle Fork and Rubicon rivers for power generation. There are five powerhouses with a rated capacity of 224 megawatts (MW), although average generation is about half of that. The highest annual generation was 1,815,000 MWh (6534 TJ) in 1983 and the lowest was 211,000 MWh (760 TJ) in 1977. All electricity produced by the project is distributed by Pacific Gas & Electric Company.

The highest elevation reservoir of the MFP is French Meadows Reservoir, which impounds up to 134,993 acre-feet (166,511 ML) of water from the upper Middle Fork. The water is diverted through French Meadows-Hell Hole Tunnel to Hell Hole Reservoir, a 207,590 acre-feet (256,060 ML) impoundment of the Rubicon River. Nearly the entire combined flow of the Middle Fork and Rubicon Rivers, except for a minimum dam release for fish and occasional spill of floodwaters, is routed from here down the Hell Hole–Middle Fork Tunnel. At the end of the tunnel water plunges 1,479 ft (451 m) to the 122.4 MW Middle Fork Powerhouse at Interbay Reservoir, which is located on the Middle Fork about 15 miles (24 km) downstream of French Meadows.

The Interbay Reservoir intercepts tributary inflows that enter the Middle Fork below French Meadows, which together with flows from Hell Hole are diverted into the Middle Fork-Ralston Tunnel, and fall another 1,105 ft (337 m) to the 79.2 MW Ralston Powerhouse, located on Oxbow Reservoir at the confluence of the Middle Fork and Rubicon Rivers. Oxbow Reservoir (Ralston Afterbay) serves as a regulating pool to allow the hydroelectric plants to operate on a peaking schedule while releasing a relatively stable flow downstream. In addition to the two main powerhouses, there are smaller powerhouses at the outlet of French Meadows-Hell Hole Tunnel, and below Hell Hole and Ralston Afterbay dams. There are no dams on the Middle Fork below Oxbow.

PCWA has consumptive rights for up to 120,000 acre-feet (150,000 ML) from the Middle Fork, although as of 2007, it was only contracted for 84,000 acre-feet (104,000 ML) of water delivery. Its main clients are the U.S. Bureau of Reclamation, San Juan Water District, the city of Roseville, and the Sacramento Suburban Water District. Water is delivered from the American River Pump Station, and PCWA is required to maintain a minimum 75 cu ft/s (2.1 m^{3}/s) flow below the station at all times. In dry years, the California Department of Water Resources may require PCWA to release additional water to maintain stream flows in the lower American River. However, PCWA has estimated that due to urban population growth, water demand may exceed its allocation before 2057.

In addition to the Middle Fork Project, the Upper American River Project (owned by Sacramento Municipal Utility District) diverts a significant amount of water from the upper Rubicon River into a separate hydroelectric system along the South Fork of the American River. It operates several reservoirs in the upper Rubicon drainage, the largest being Loon Lake. The annual diversion from the Rubicon River is about 180,000 acre-feet (220,000 ML).

== Recreation ==
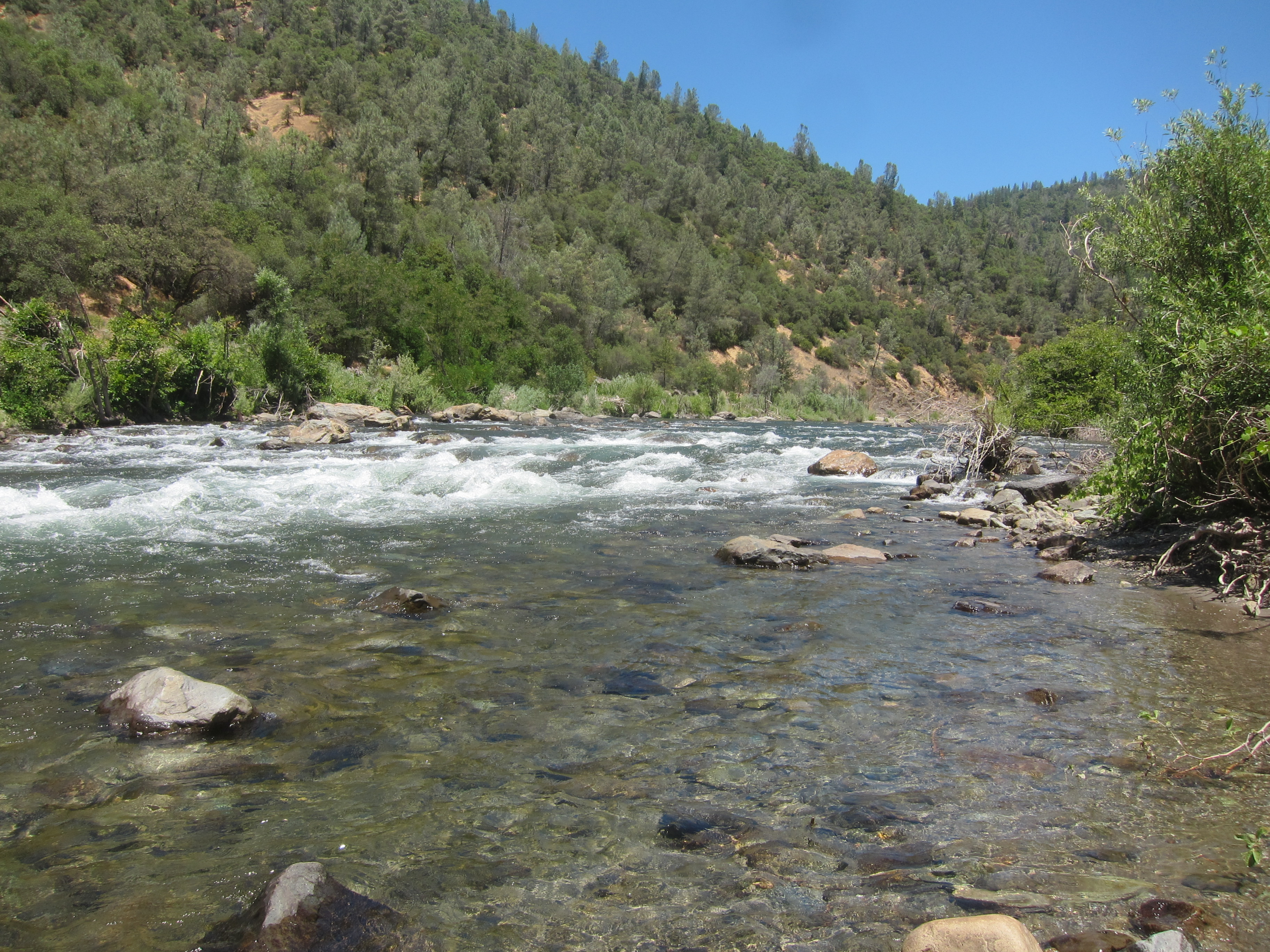
Rapids on the Middle Fork downstream of Ruck-a-Chucky Falls

The Western States Trail follows a winding 100-mile (160 km) course through the canyons of the Middle Fork and its tributaries from Auburn to Squaw Valley. The first third of the trail from Auburn to Foresthill closely follows the Middle Fork canyon; parts of the trail were built on the alignment of old mining ditches, and are relatively flat. East of Foresthill the trail ascends into the North Fork Middle Fork before rejoining the Middle Fork at the top of Red Star Ridge overlooking French Meadows Reservoir. It then follows the northern ridge of the Middle Fork valley through the river's headwaters at the Sierra Crest before reaching Squaw Valley. The trail also links to the American River Parkway at its western end, allowing hikers and equestrians to travel all the way from Sacramento. There are many other trails that provide access from the rim of the canyon to various points along the river. About 50 miles (80 km) of the trail has been designated a National Recreation Trail.

The Middle Fork has whitewater rafting below Oxbow Reservoir; due to Federal hydroelectric licensing and the need to deliver water downstream for irrigation and consumption, boatable flows are released year-round, even in the most severe drought conditions. Releases of 1,000 cubic feet per second (28 m^{3}/s) or more typically begin at 7:00 am in the summer months and are ramped down gradually in the evening. Without the dams, river flow in late summer would average around 300 cubic feet per second (8.5 m^{3}/s) naturally. There are 15 miles (24 km) of Class III–V (intermediate to difficult) and 9 miles (14 km) of Class II (moderate) whitewater on this stretch of the river. The Class VI Ruck-A-Chucky Falls, located about midway between Oxbow Reservoir and the North Fork confluence, is the most dangerous rapid on the Middle Fork and is portaged by all commercial outfitters and most private boaters. Commercial rafting trips were first done on this section in 1981 by three companies. Today multiple commercial rafting companies offer trips on this section May–September.

The Mammoth Bar OHV Area is located next to the river near Auburn. The popular motorcycle/ATV riding area was established in 1993.

The Middle Fork is still a site for recreational gold panning, although it is not nearly as popular as the South Fork. There are about 400 active mining claims on the Middle Fork. Although the river is open year-round, the use of equipment such as metal detectors is restricted.

== See also ==
- American River topics
- List of rivers of California

== Works cited ==
- Adams, Jesse; et al. (2007). "North Fork/Middle Fork American River Sediment Study" (PDF). California Department of Water Resources.
- Egleston, Thomas (1890). The Metallurgy of Silver, Gold and Mercury in the United States, Volume II. John Wiley & Sons.
- Farquhar, Francis P. (2007). History of the Sierra Nevada. University of California Press. ISBN 978-0-52025-395-7.
- Lee, Rodi; Lynch, Michael G. (2012). American River Canyon. Arcadia Publishing. ISBN 978-0-73859-319-7.
- Parr, Barry (2014). Hiking the Sierra Nevada: A Guide to the Area's Greatest Hiking Adventures. Rowman & Littlefield. ISBN 978-1-49301-121-6.
- PCWA (Dec 2007). "Supporting Document B: Detailed Existing Project Description" (PDF). Middle Fork Project Relicensing, Environmental Impact Statement. Placer County Water Agency.
- Smith, Jordan Fisher (2006). Nature Noir: A Park Ranger's Patrol in the Sierra. Houghton Mifflin Harcourt. ISBN 0-54752-649-0.
- Summers, Jordan (2012). 60 Hikes Within 60 Miles: Sacramento: Including Auburn, Folsom, and Davis. Menasha Ridge Press. ISBN 978-0-89732-605-6.
- Troyano, Leonardo Fernández (2003). Bridge Engineering: A Global Perspective. Thomas Telford. ISBN 0-72773-215-3.
