= Slab Creek Dam =

Dam on the American River watershed in California

Coordinates: 38°46′25″N 120°41′54″W

Slab Creek Dam is a dam in the American River watershed of the central Sierra Nevada, within El Dorado County, California.

The dam and reservoir impound the upper South Fork American River for hydroelectric power, and are named for Slab Creek, a nearby tributary.

== Dam ==
The concrete arch dam was constructed in 1967 (58 years ago) as part of the Upper American River Project by the Sacramento Municipal Utility District (SMUD). It has a height of 250 feet (76 m), and a length of 825 feet (251 m) at its crest.

Slab Creek Dam is one of several dams and reservoirs owned by SMUD. Others include the 1959 Ice House Dam, the 1963 Loon Lake Dam, and the 1963 Union Valley Dam.

== Slab Creek Reservoir ==
The reservoir the dam creates, Slab Creek Reservoir, has a normal water surface of 249 acres (101 ha), and a normal capacity of 16,600 acre-feet. Recreation on and around the reservoir includes fishing, camping, and rafting.

== Iowa Hill Pumped-Storage Project ==
An additional project called the Iowa Hill Pumped-Storage Project was planned in 2001, which would have taken water from the Slab Creek reservoir during off-peak times, to be released for electricity generation at times of high demand. In February 2016 the project was cancelled, on the grounds that by the time it was completed, that type of storage would not be needed.

== See also ==
- Dams on the American River
- Sacramento Municipal Utility District dams
- List of dams and reservoirs in California
