= Hell Hole Reservoir =

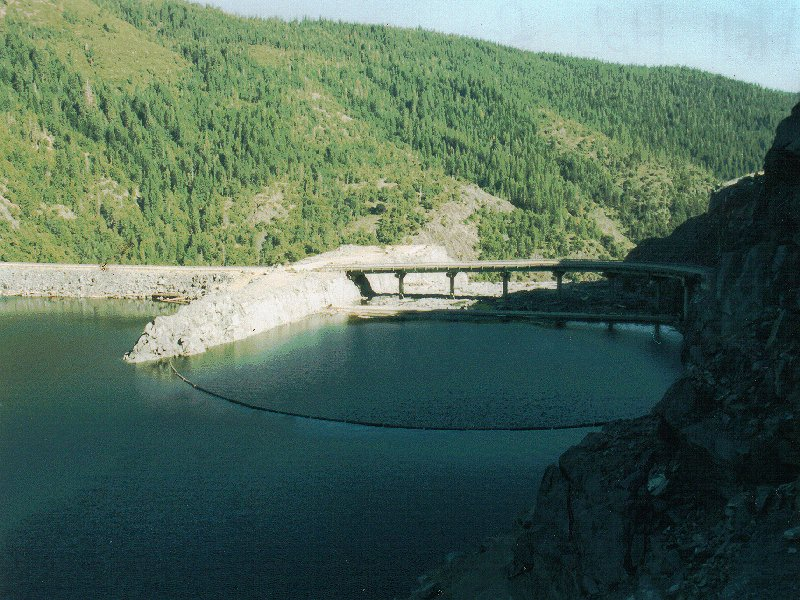

- Location within California Location within the United States
- Location: Placer County, California
- Coordinates: 39.08011°N 120.39230°W
- Type: Reservoir
- Basin countries: United States
- Water volume: 208,400 acre⋅ft (257,100,000 m^{3})
- Surface elevation: 4,630 ft (1,411 m)

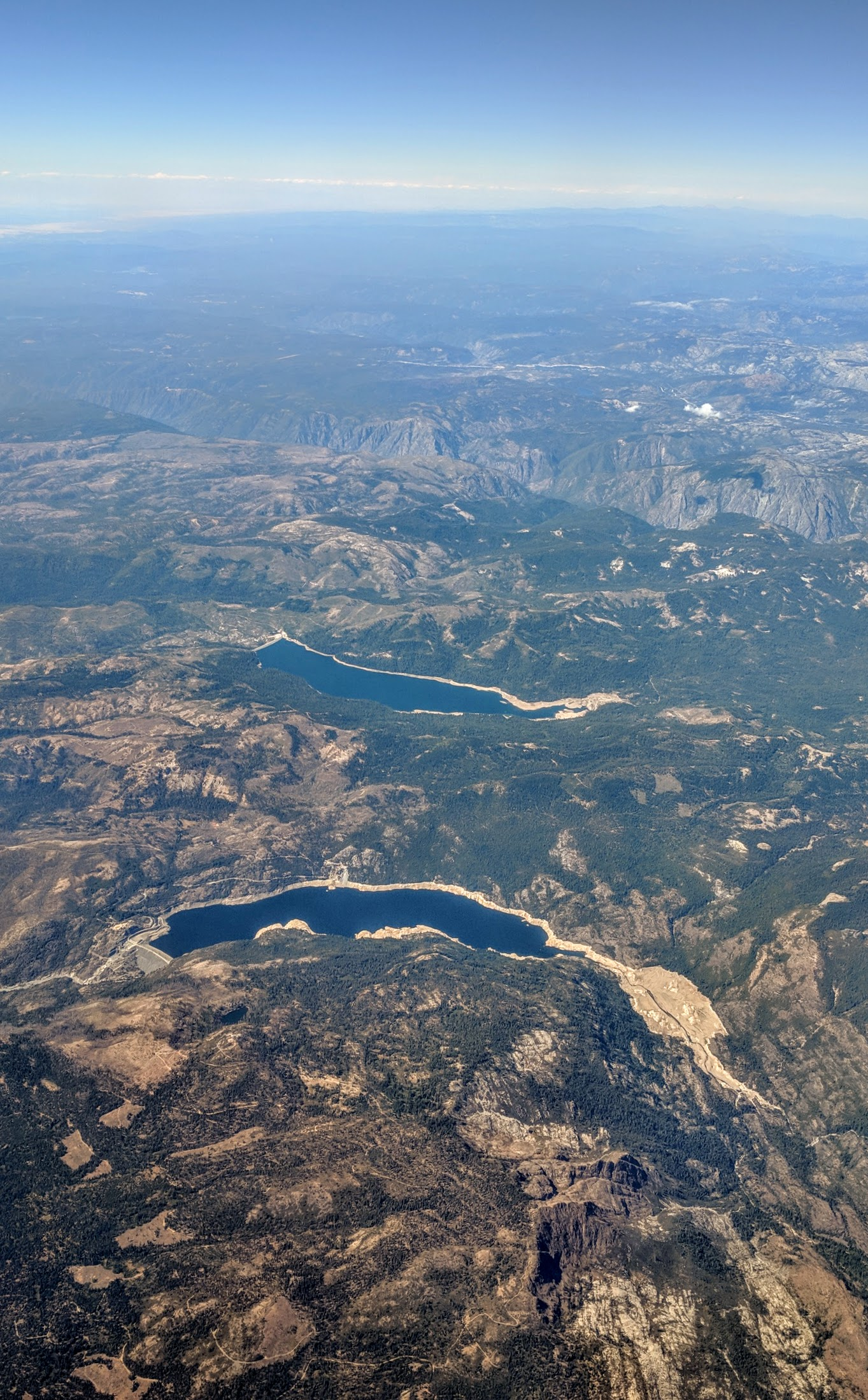
Aerial view from the south-southeast of French Meadows Reservoir (far) and Hell Hole Reservoir (near) in the Sierra Nevada just west of Lake Tahoe

Hell Hole Reservoir is an artificial, crescent-shaped lake in the Sierra Nevada mountain range 10 miles (16 km) west of Lake Tahoe in California, United States. The lake is about 3.5 miles (5.6 km) long when at full capacity.

The lake was created in 1966 with the completion of Lower Hell Hole Dam across the Rubicon River, a major tributary of the Middle Fork of the American River. Hell Hole is named for a deep canyon which is now under the waters of the lake.

How the canyon came to be named Hell Hole is a combination of folklore and speculation. An early author, George Wharton James (1858–1923), visited the canyon in 1913. He imagined that one of the miners seeking riches in the 1860s, in what was then called "Squaw Valley", now Olympic Valley must have thought it "a hell of a hole to get into or out of", but admitted his source for the place name was more speculative than the anonymous miner's chances for riches in the area.

James' guide for the 1913 camping expedition to Hell Hole was Bob Watson, a well-known camping guide who operated in the Lake Tahoe Region from the 1880s into the first decades of the 20th century. Watson may have been the source of the story as he sought to entertain and edify his paying clients with tales of local history. James attributed much of the local lore to Watson.

The United States Board on Geographic Names attributes the first use of the name "Hell Hole" to a United States Geological Survey map of 1894. The board was created in 1890, so previous uses of the name on federal government maps are possible.

James reported finding a natural lake near the Hell Hole chasm known as Bear Lake, which would have been drowned by the reservoir. He also described Hell Hole in terms that bely the colorful name: "Hell Hole? Then give me more of it," he wrote. The author reported his pleasure of the canyon was derived from its rugged nature that precluded human exploitation: Logging, mining, water development and road building, evident in other portions of the Lake Tahoe region. It was "a paradise of delightful surprises," he wrote.

== Description ==
Lower Hell Hole Dam (its official name) is operated by the Placer County Water Agency. The agency controls two dams in the Eldorado National Forest and Tahoe National Forest. The water agency gained its power from financing approved by Placer County voters in 1961.

Proposals for the dam date to 1958. In 1964 the first Hell Hole dam was partially complete. The dam collapsed on December 23, 1964. A new dam was completed in 1966. Placer County sought drinking water supplies to fuel growth of its communities in the Sacramento Valley. The gold-rush-era town of Auburn is in Placer County as is the suburban community of Roseville. The agency also sought to generate hydroelectric power to finance its ability to deliver the water to users.

=== Recreational uses ===
The lake's principal inflows are from the Rubicon River and Five Lakes Creek, formerly a tributary of the Rubicon. Lake water has drowned the historical confluence of the two water courses. The Rubicon River was once known as the south fork of the middle fork of the American River. The Rubicon River's entry into the lake is via a cataract where the river has eroded through the elevated granite block.

The lake also features many small granitic islands that expand and contract with the level of the lake.

In 1984, the federally protected Granite Chief Wilderness was created by the United States Congress after a long advocacy campaign by the Sierra Club, a conservation organization.

Upper Hell Hole forms the western border of the Granite Chief Wilderness. A small buffer zone between the lake shore and the wilderness prevents accidental intrusion into the wilderness. The juxtaposition of the lake and wilderness presents the opportunity for rustic boat/backpacking adventures through the rugged and scenic 25,680 acres (103.9 km^{2}) of wilderness. Like the lake itself, the wilderness is lightly used on the western border. Hell Hole Trail enters the wilderness from near the lake but is difficult to locate. Granite Chief Wilderness is managed by the Tahoe National Forest, while visitor facilities at Hell Hole are exclusively managed by El Dorado National Forest (Georgetown district).

The Truckee and American River (formerly Foresthill) ranger districts of the Tahoe National Forest advise caution at Granite Chief: "Topographic maps and skills to use them are highly recommended in the wilderness because of the minimal level in signing and remoteness of the area." Wilderness permits are not required to enter the Granite Chief Wilderness. Campfire permits are always required.

The California Office of Environmental Health Hazard Assessment (OEHHA) has developed a safe eating advisory for Hell Hole Reservoir based on levels of mercury found in species of fish caught there.

== Hydrology ==
The construction of the present Hell Hole Dam also changed the course of the Rubicon River.

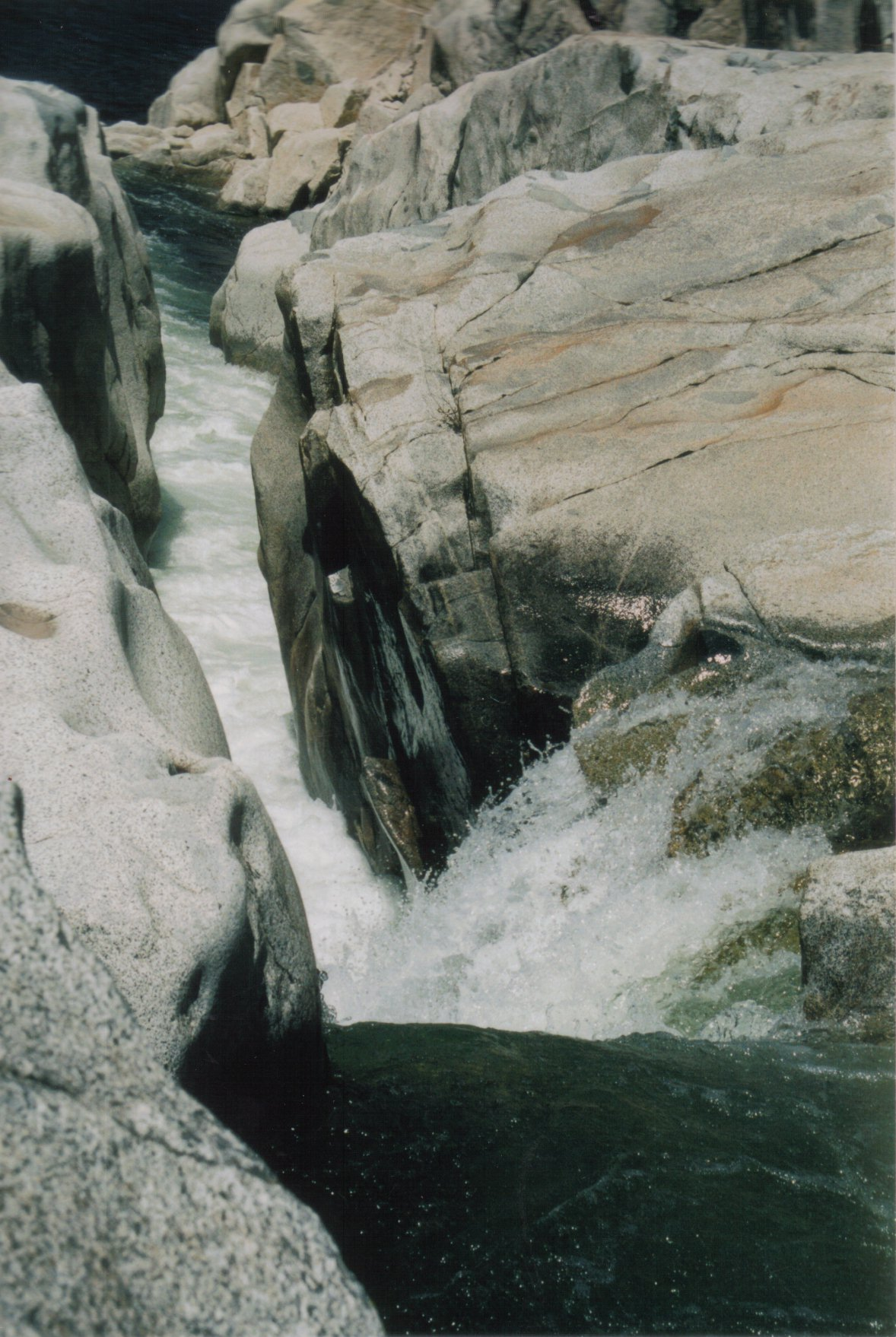
Lowest cataract on Rubicon River before it enters the reservoir

The pre-dam river channel wended its way several miles to its confluence with the Middle Fork of the American River near Ralston Afterbay. Now, in addition to releases from Hell Hole down the pre-dam path, water is diverted through a pipeline to Middle Fork Powerhouse (AKA Stephenson Powerhouse) where it flows into Interbay Reservoir. From here, in addition to releases down the Middle Fork American River, the water is diverted into a tunnel to Ralston Powerhouse and into Ralston Afterbay, where it joins water from the pre-dam path. Oxbow Powerhouse and Oxbow control dam there releases water into the middle fork of the American River just below the spot of the historical confluence.

Water for hydroelectric generation is also shuttled into Hell Hole from French Meadows Reservoir which impounds the Middle Fork of the American River. The water travels through a tunnel to a powerhouse located on the north side of Hell Hole. French Meadows, at 5,200 ft elevation, is higher than the 4,700-foot (1,400 m) elevation at Hell Hole. The powerhouse at Hell Hole is actually known by the name, French Meadows powerhouse.

The traditional channel of the Rubicon River still maintains water flow from the spillway at Hell Hole Dam and from tributaries of the Rubicon below the dam, such as Gerle Creek (pronounced "girly").

The Placer County Water Agency does not take water directly from Hell Hole or the other dam but instead claims rights to the water as it is shipped through the American River System and ends up at Folsom Lake near Sacramento. Folsom Dam was originally constructed for the purposes of flood control. The Placer water agency's dams and Ralston are presently known as the Middle Fork Project.

== Historical usage ==
Hell Hole Canyon and nearby vicinities initially escaped man-made exploitation during the latter half of the 19th century, but events that occurred then allowed eventual exploitation of Hell Hole during the 1960s.

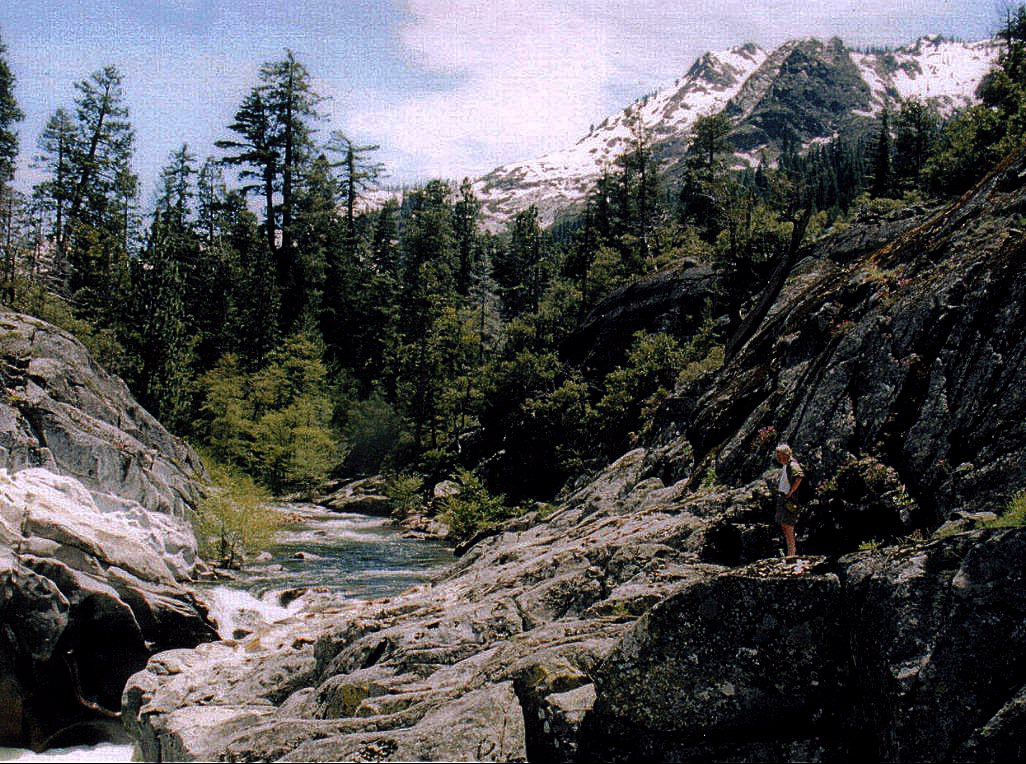
Rubicon river and upper cataract

The Gold Rush of 1849 on the South Fork of the American River resulted in establishment of the Sierra foothill towns of Auburn, Placerville, Nevada City, and Georgetown. The Gold Rush did not intrude into the higher elevations of the Sierra Nevada range, but the water and timber needs of these towns did intrude into the upper elevations. In one case in 1873, the privately owned California Water Company employed a scheme to dam Loon Lake to the south of Hell Hole and then sluice the water closer to Georgetown where it could be used by residents and farmers.

Somewhat later, in 1862, the residents of Placer County (Auburn, Foresthill) devised a scheme to build a road from the Foresthill divide to Olympic Valley with the intent of luring immigrant trains away from Nevada City and into Placerville and neighboring vicinities. George Wharton James, the author, described the road as an ill-fated enterprise: "The grade is frightful. For an hour or more, we go slowly up it stopping every few yards or so to give our horses breath," James wrote of a ride on the old road a half century after it was built. "It is hard enough for horses to go up this grade but to pull heavily-ladened (sic) wagons - it seems impossible, " he concluded. Later attempts to improve this road or forge other wagon roads were not successful.

The Comstock Lode silver rush in the 1860s in Nevada Territory also encouraged the attempt of the gold-rush foothillers to find pathways over the mountains to the riches of the Comstock and the more local Olympic Valley silver excitement.

The roads then brought timber claimants and homesteaders, called locators, who were able to claim public lands. The old homesteads and timber claims were bought by private water companies or hoteliers who sought visitors to the "healthful" mineral springs after much of the timber was depleted by the mid-1880s.

Railroads brought the tourists. Tourists could reach Truckee, California by rail from either San Francisco or Ogden, Utah by the end of the 19th century. The Lake Tahoe Railway and Transportation Company brought them to the lake. One particular resort established east of Hell Hole has a significant relationship to the canyon. Deer Park, just south of Olympic Valley (formerly "Squaw Valley", a ski area and home to the 1960 Winter Olympics) was a tourist hotel which had a rustic hideaway camp at Five Lakes now in Granite Chief Wilderness. James described the Five Lakes resort as a 160-acre (0.65 km^{2}) timber claim in which the timber had never been cut but in which cabins had been built and rowboats kept in hand for fishing upon the five small lakes.

The Five Lakes are the headwaters of Five Lakes Creek which led James on his 1913 horseback descent into Hell Hole in the company of Bob Watson, the guide. The pair camped at Hell Hole, then ascended the Rubicon River to Rockbound Lake, where they camped again. Rockbound Lake is now in the Desolation Wilderness and is near the headwaters of the Rubicon River. The Sacramento Municipal Utility District controls a dam within the Desolation Wilderness: Rubicon Reservoir. Desolation Wilderness was created in 1969.

== Later history ==
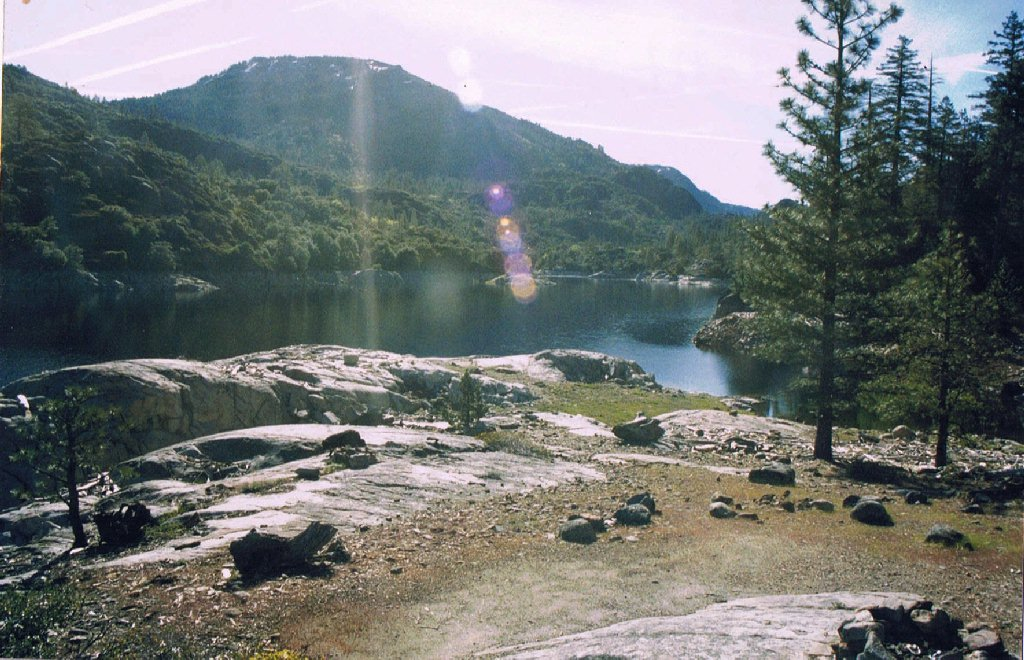
Upper Hell Hole looking northwest to Granite Chief Wilderness, May 2005

Placer County's 1961 bond approval allowed its water agency to seek out water supplies that were not already claimed by others. Loon Lake, south of Hell Hole, was already prescripted, but the rugged, untouched Hell Hole was not. In 1934, the State of California took steps to claim any unclaimed water rights along the American River's three forks. In 1962 the rights to the Rubicon River water were conveyed to Placer County.

The Hell Hole dam, a rock-fill-type dam, was partially completed at the time of extremely heavy storms in December 1964. The downstream rock-fill portion was up about 220 feet above the river bottom, but the impervious core and adjacent zones were only up about 35 feet. Debris from extreme storm runoff upstream of the dam blocked the diversion outlet, and water rapidly accumulated behind the partially constructed dam. As the water came up it seeped through the rockfill, and when it crested, the entire mass collapsed in a matter of minutes. A surge went down the canyon, washing out two older suspension bridges below the Long Canyon influx and at the Spanish Dry Diggins Road crossing near Greenwood. It then washed out the State Highway 49 bridge over the American River just below Auburn. Folsom Dam reservoir absorbed the surge below that point.

The Placer County Water Agency began a new dam which was completed in 1966 and has stood on the site ever since.

== See also ==
- List of dams and reservoirs in California
- List of largest reservoirs of California
- American River (California) topics
