= Silver Creek (American River tributary) =

Silver Creek is a major tributary of the South Fork American River in the Sierra Nevada mountain range.

It begins below the dam of Junction Reservoir where its two main tributaries meet: South Fork Silver Creek and Big Silver Creek.

== River Modifications ==
There are three reservoirs, all part of the Upper American River Project, along Silver Creek and its tributaries before the main stem empties into the South Fork American River just north of Pollock Pines. Ice House Reservoir lies along South Fork Silver Creek four miles northwest of Kyburz. Nine miles northwest of Kyburz is Union Valley Reservoir, the river project's principal reservoir. Three tributaries flow into Union House Reservoir, including Big Silver Creek, Jones Fork Silver Creek, and Tells Creek. And thirdly, Junction Reservoir sits directly below Union House Dam.

== Geography ==
Beginning at Island Lake in the Desolation Wilderness on the western slope of the Crystal Range, South Fork Silver Creek flows immediately into Twin Lakes, followed by Wrights Lake, then flows southwest for about 2.5 miles where it receives Lyons Creek. Now starting to flow due west, it reaches Ice House Reservoir. Below the dam, South Fork Silver Creek winds its way west for 4.5 miles before turning northward for another 7.5 miles where it empties into Junction Reservoir.

Big Silver Creek begins near Pearl Lake just to the southeast of Two Peaks East in the Desolation Wilderness and flows for six miles due west into Union Valley Reservoir. It receives Little Silver Creek immediately below the dam and flows into Junction Reservoir.
