= SMUD Headquarters Building =

- U.S. National Register of Historic Places
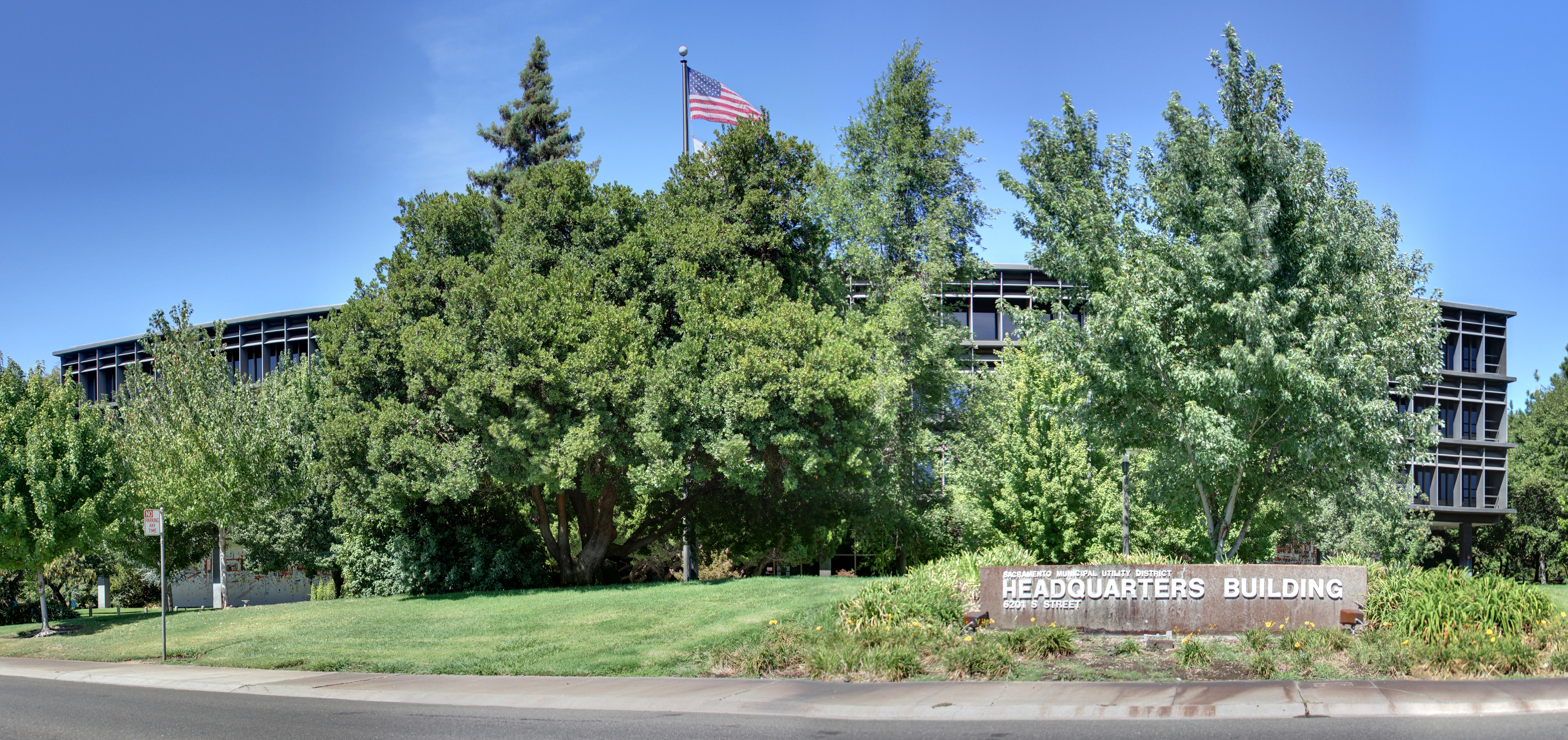

- Location within Sacramento, California Location within California Location within the United States
- Location: 6201 S St, Sacramento, California
- Coordinates: 38°33′07.8″N 121°25′53.6″W
- Built: 1959
- Architect: Dreyfuss & Blackford
- Architectural style: Modernist
- NRHP reference No.: 09001161
- Added to NRHP: January 4, 2010

The SMUD Headquarters Building is the Sacramento Municipal Utility District headquarters. It is located at 6201 S Street in Sacramento, California.

== Architecture ==
The 166,000 square-foot building was designed in the Modernist style by Dreyfuss & Blackford Architects in 1959. Construction was completed in 1961. It is influenced by the work of Mies van der Rohe.

The building has adjustable aluminum louvers that are used to control the temperature and lighting in and of the building. The exterior also features a tile mural by internationally-known artist Wayne Thiebaud called Water City, which serves as a tribute to the Sacramento and American Rivers.

The SMUD Headquarters Building was listed on the National Register of Historic Places in 2010.

== See also ==
- History of Sacramento, California
- California Historical Landmarks in Sacramento County, California
- National Register of Historic Places listings in Sacramento County, California
