= Upper American River Project =

Hydroelectric system in Sacramento, California

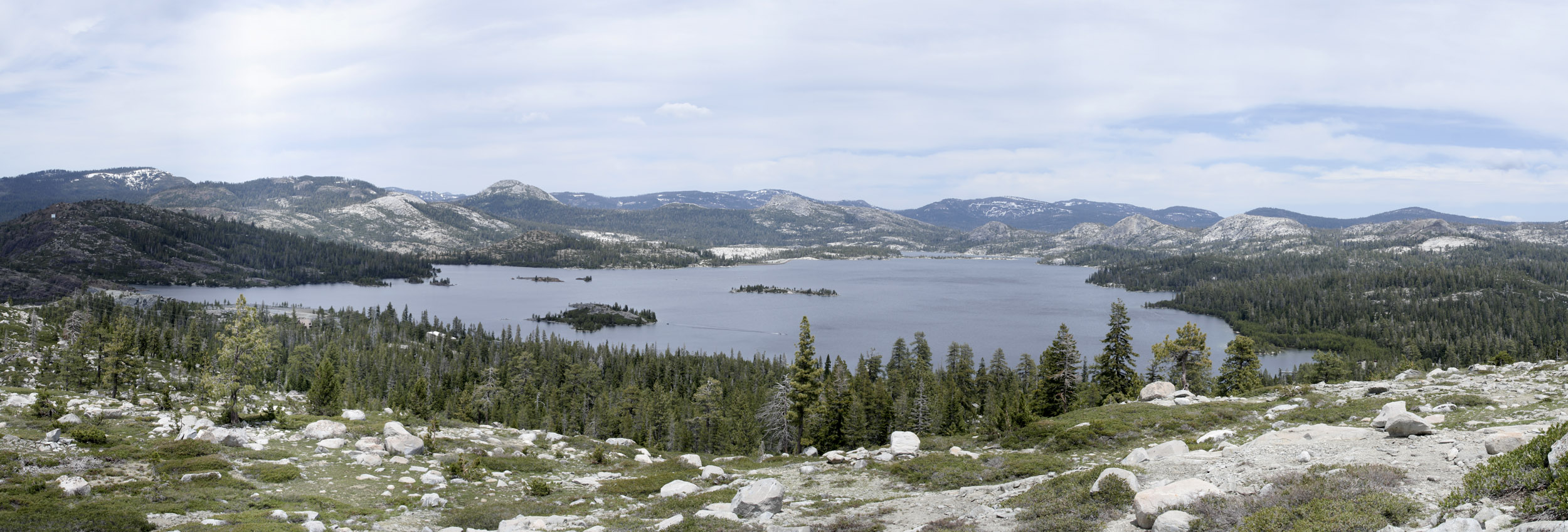
Loon Lake, the uppermost major storage reservoir of UARP−Upper American River Project.

The Upper American River Project (UARP) is a hydroelectric system operated by the Sacramento Municipal Utility District (SMUD) of Sacramento, California in the United States.

The system consists of 11 dams and eight powerhouses that tap the upper tributaries of the American River drainage in the Sierra Nevada for power generation. Total installed capacity is over 687 MW, producing 1.8 billion KWh annually, enough for 20 percent of the city's electricity needs.

The project mainly uses water from the South Fork American River and its tributaries, although some water is drawn from the Rubicon River, a tributary of the Middle Fork American River. Project dams provide water storage of about 430,000 acre⋅ft (530,000 dam^{3}) and a total hydraulic head of 5,417 ft (1,651 m) from the highest reservoir to the lowest powerplant outflow.

== History ==
The UARP was authorized on August 28, 1957, by an act of the Federal Power Commission. SMUD began construction in September of that year, and the first power generation from UARP came online at Jaybird Powerhouse on May 1, 1961. Most of the project facilities were completed by 1967. The Loon Lake Powerhouse was completed in 1971, and Jones Fork Powerhouse was finished in 1985.

Environmental impacts include the prevention of fish passage by the project's dams, which segment parts of the upper South Fork American River, the Rubicon River and their tributaries.

== Overview ==
Water is diverted from the Rubicon River to a storage reservoir, Loon Lake, from which it is released through the Loon Lake Powerhouse to Gerle Creek. This water is intercepted and diverted into Silver Creek, a tributary of the South Fork American River, flowing through the Robbs Peak Powerhouse into Union Valley Reservoir, the project's principal reservoir. Water from Ice House Reservoir also enters Union Valley via the Jones Fork Powerhouse.

From Union Valley, water flows through the Union Valley Powerhouse to Junction Reservoir, then through Jaybird Powerhouse to Camino Reservoir, both on Silver Creek. The water then enters a penstock that feeds the Camino Powerhouse above Slab Creek Reservoir on the South Fork American River. From there, water is sent through a final tunnel to White Rock Powerhouse, located on the upper end of Chili Bar Reservoir also on the South Fork.

== List of facilities ==
Dams and reservoirs
Dam	Stream	Capacity	
		acre.ft	dam^{3}
Brush Creek	Brush Creek	1,530	1,890
Buck Island†	Unnamed	1,070	1,320
Camino	Silver Creek	825	1,018
Gerle Creek	Gerle Creek	5,231	6,452
Ice House	South Fork Silver Creek	45,960	56,690
Junction	Silver Creek	3,250	4,010
Slab Creek	South Fork American River	16,600	20,500
Loon Lake	Gerle Creek	76,200	94,000
Robbs Peak†	South Fork Rubicon River	30	37
Rubicon	Rubicon River	1,450	1,790
Union Valley	Silver Creek	277,290	342,030
Total		429,436	529,702

† indicates a diversion dam

Power plants
Name	Capacity (MW)	Hydraulic head		Annual generation (KWh, 2002–2012)
		ft	m	
Camino	150.0	1,065	325	356,187,000
Jaybird	144.0	1,535	468	532,315,000
Jones Fork	11.5	580	180	20,677,000
Loon Lake	82.0	1,179	359	97,891,000
Robbs Peak	29.0	361	110	48,897,000
Slab Creek	0.4	250	76	1,612,000
Union Valley	46.7	420	130	123,393,000
White Rock	224.0	867	264	529,824,000
Total	687.6			1.710794×10^{9}
