= South Fork American River =

River in El Dorado County, California, United States

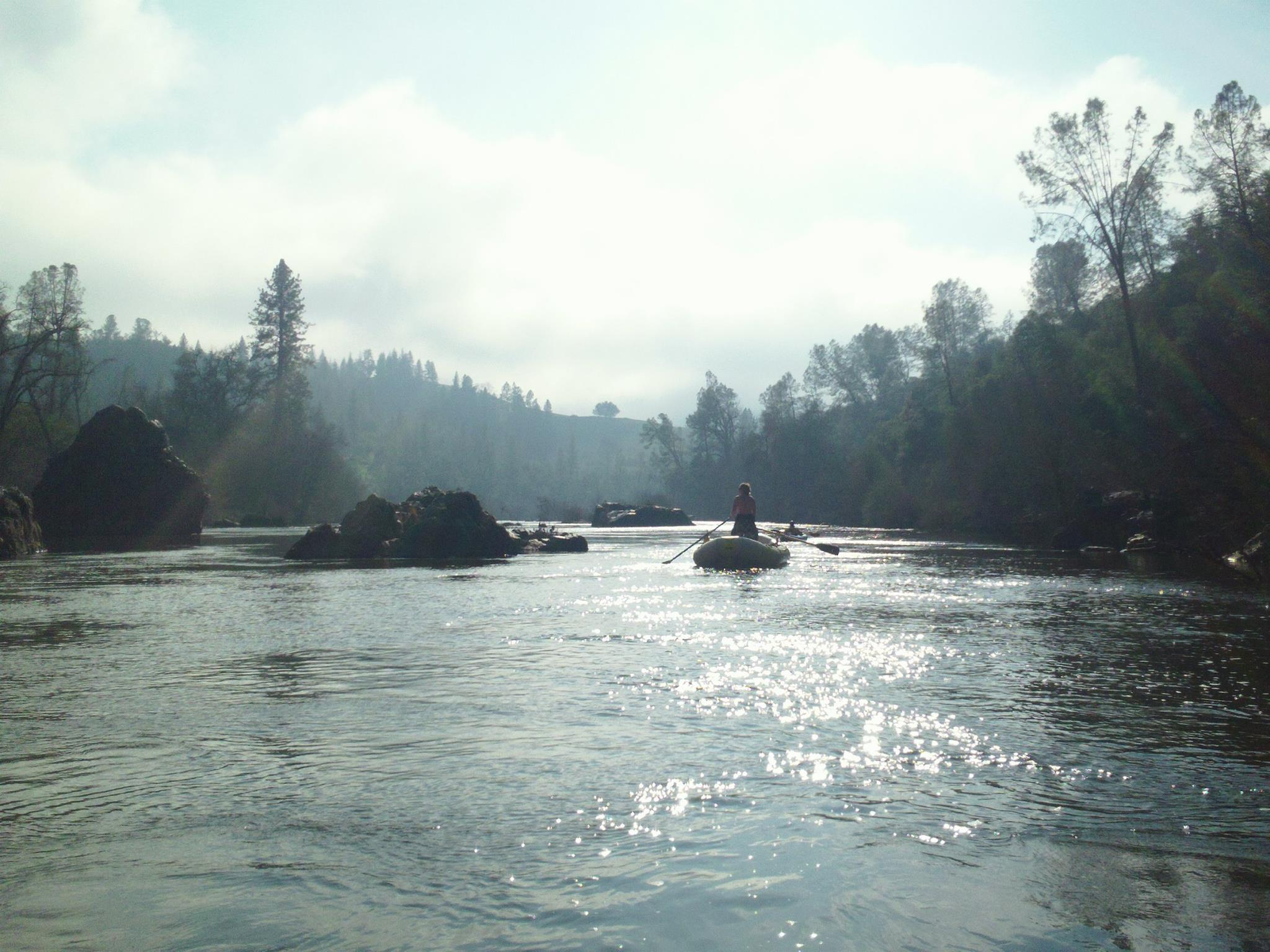

Location
- Country: United States
- State: California

Physical characteristics
- Source
  - location: Sierra Nevada
  - coordinates: 38°48′38″N 120°01′52″W
- Mouth
  - location: Folsom Lake
  - coordinates: 38°44′03″N 121°06′15″W
  - elevation: 466 ft (142 m)
- Length: 87 mi (140 km)
- Basin size: 840 mi^{2} (2,200 km^{2})
- Discharge
  - average: 1,458 cu ft/s (41.3 m^{3}/s)

Basin features
- Progression: American–Sacramento

The South Fork American River is a major tributary of the American River in El Dorado County, California, United States, draining a watershed on the western slope of the Sierra Nevada east of Sacramento. The river begins in pristine Desolation Wilderness and flows through the Sierra Nevada foothills. The river at Coloma was the site of James Marshall's discovery of gold at Sutter's Mill on January 24, 1848, which started the California Gold Rush. The South Fork of the American is "the most popular recreation stream in the West" for whitewater rafting in North America, e.g., 80,000 visitors in 2011. Professional whitewater rafting companies have been offering commercial rafting trips on the South Fork American River since 1978.

== Geography ==
The river begins at Nebelhorn near Johnson Pass about 10 mi (16 km) south of Lake Tahoe. From there it flows west for 87 mi (140 km), past the towns of Kyburz, Pollock Pines and Coloma, before emptying into Folsom Lake, the reservoir formed by the Folsom Dam. The North Fork American River also flows into the lake, and the combined rivers form the American River proper, which flows from the dam southwest to a confluence with the Sacramento River.

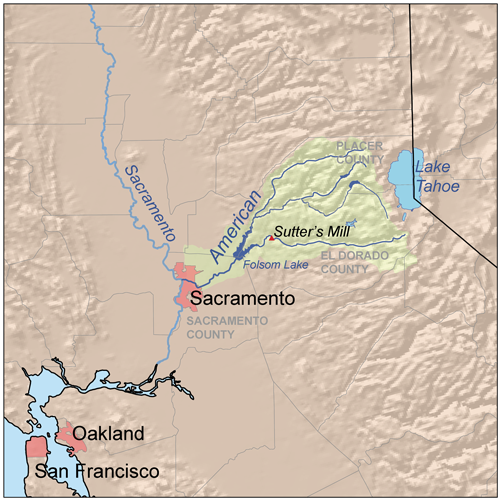
Map of the American River system. The South Fork flows due west from El Dorado County into Folsom Lake near the bottom of the watershed.

The South Fork drains an area of 840 mi^{2} (2,200 km^{2}), or about a third of the 2,150 mi^{2} (5,600 km^{2}) American River watershed. Major tributaries include Silver Creek, Rock Creek, Weber Creek, and Silver Fork American River. Most of the watershed consists of high, forested mountains and steep-sided valleys that receive up to 40 in (1,000 mm) of annual precipitation, except for the westernmost section which consists of drier foothill country. The river also contributes about a third of the total outflow of the American River system.

=== Discharge ===
According to a U.S. Geological Survey stream gage at Lotus, about 5 mi (8.0 km) above Folsom Lake, the average discharge was 1,458 cu ft/s (41.3 m^{3}/s) from 1951 to 1995. The highest recorded flow was 90,000 cu ft/s (2,500 m^{3}/s) on January 1, 1997 (see New Year's Flood), and the lowest monthly mean was 86.8 cu ft/s (2.46 m^{3}/s) in July 1977.

== Recreation ==
Rafting and kayaking

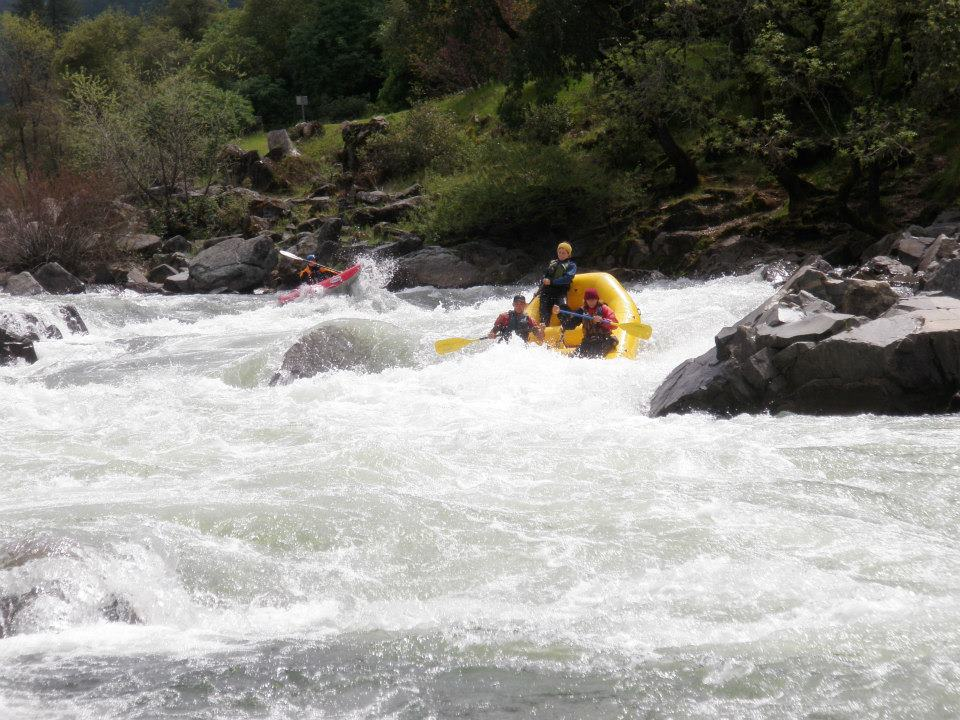
A raft and an inflatable kayak maneuver through Troublemaker rapid in Coloma California

The South Fork of the American has approximately eight sections of boatable whitewater ranging from class II to class V. The most commonly run section of river is the class III stretch between Chili Bar Dam and Folsom Lake.

This 20 mile section is best divided into two days of boating, from Chili Bar to Coloma (Chili Bar) and Coloma to Folsom Lake (The Gorge). Established boating and river rescue skills are required to run this section of river.

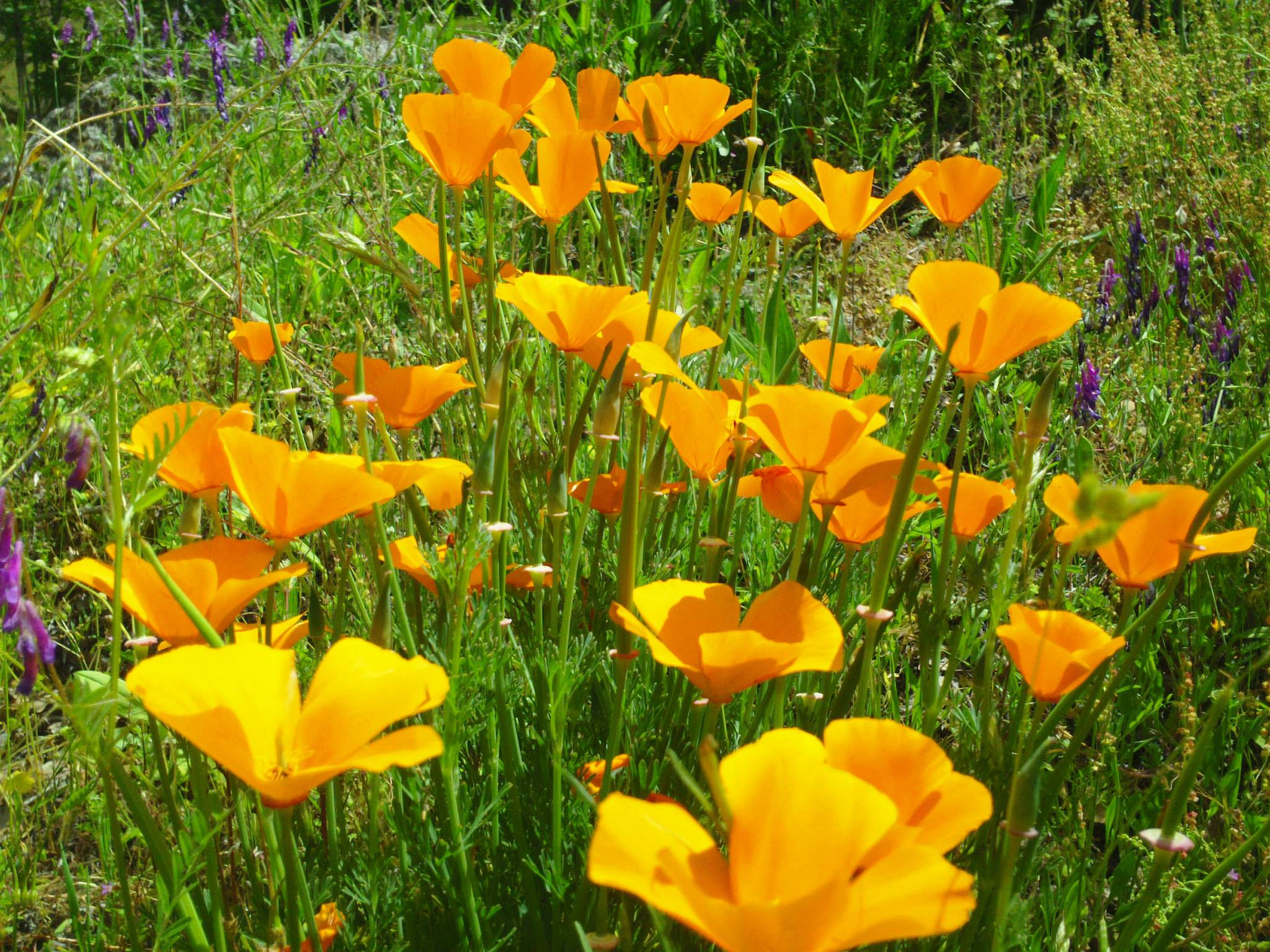
California poppies

Hiking, mountain biking and horse riding

There is BLM land located off Highway 49 on the way to Auburn from Coloma with hiking, biking and equestrian trails.

These BLM managed areas are part of a 20-year joint effort with the American River Conservancy to protect the habitat and beauty of the South Fork of the American River. The trail represents the foothills' various ecosystems including grasslands, oak woodland, chaparral and riparian habitats.

== Dams ==
There are two dams on the South Fork proper: Slab Creek Dam, which forms Slab Creek Reservoir near Camino, and Chili Bar Dam, located north of Placerville. Both are run-of-the-river dams serving mainly for hydroelectricity production. Other major dams in the South Fork basin include ones at Union Valley Reservoir and Ice House Reservoir on the Silver Creek drainage. Most of the dams and reservoirs in the basin are operated by the Sacramento Municipal Utility District (SMUD) as part of the 688 megawatt Upper American River Project and Pacific Gas and Electric as part of the Chili Bar Project.

== See also ==
- American River topics
