= Rubicon River (California) =

River in the Sierra Nevada of California, US

Coordinates: 39.0027°N 120.7320°W

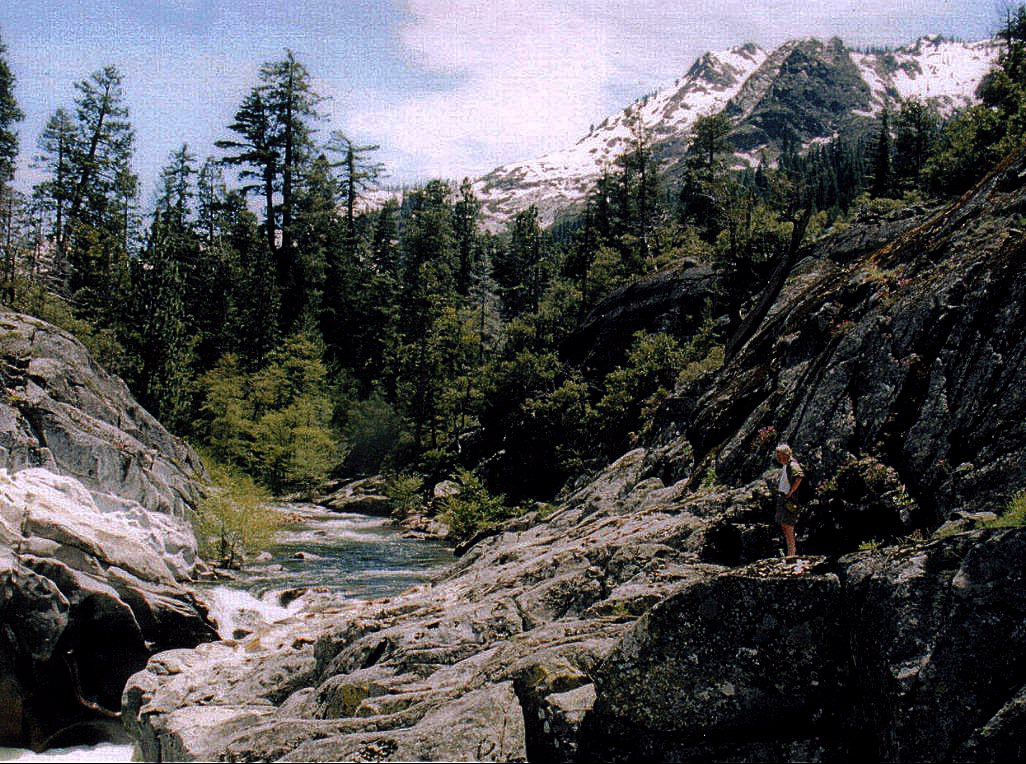
A man considers crossing the Rubicon, above Hell Hole Reservoir

The Rubicon River is a major tributary of the Middle Fork American River in the Sierra Nevada of Northern California, west of Lake Tahoe. Its length is 60 miles (97 km) with a watershed of about 184 square miles (477 km^{2}). The river's headwaters are in the Crystal Range of the Sierra Nevada, within the Eldorado National Forest's Desolation Wilderness. Historically, the Rubicon River was known as the South Fork of the Middle Fork of the American River.

== Headwaters ==
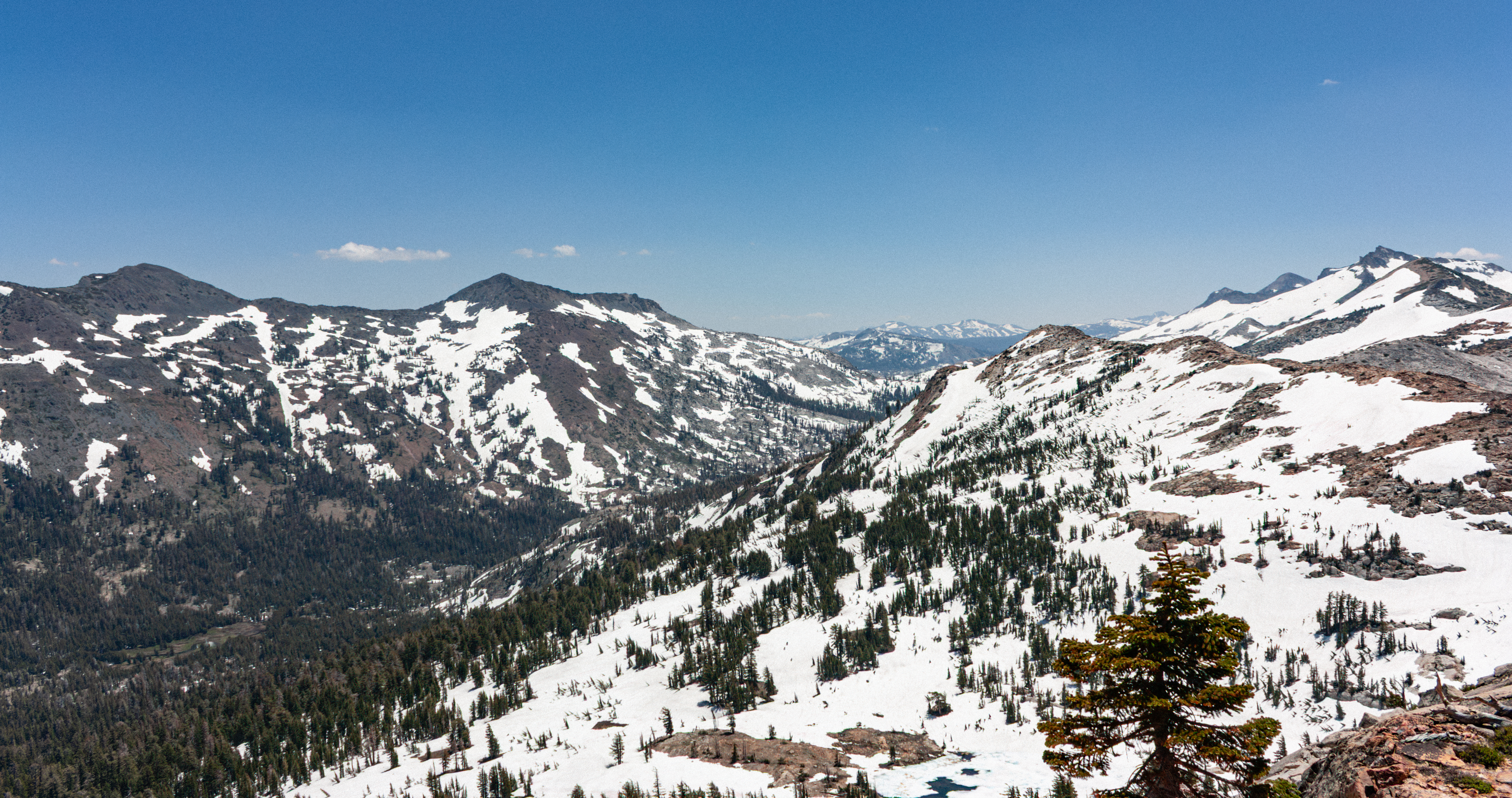
Looking south along the Rubicon River towards its headwaters

The Rubicon River originates at 9,900 feet (3,018 m) near Clyde Lake in El Dorado County. It flows north-northwest for approximately 8 mi (12.9 km) until it reaches Rubicon Reservoir. The river then travels northwest and within 4.8 mi (7.7 km) of the Rubicon Reservoir is met by Highland Creek, Miller Creek, and the Little Rubicon River. It continues northwest for approximately 5 mi (8 km) to Hell Hole Reservoir. Shortly after the river begins flowing southwest from the reservoir, it serves as a border between El Dorado and Placer Counties, and joins the South Fork of the Rubicon River.

== South Fork ==
The South Fork of the Rubicon River originates about a mile southeast of Loon Lake. It flows southwest for several miles until it is joined by Gerle Creek, and then travels west to its confluence with the Rubicon River. The river slowly changes course and eventually heads northwest again, finally, joining the Middle Fork of the American River about 20 mi (32 km) northeast of Auburn. The Middle Fork meets the North Fork of the American River in the Auburn State Recreation Area below the Foresthill Bridge, and flows into Folsom Lake.

The reservoirs and trails along the Rubicon River are recreation areas, managed primarily by the Eldorado National Forest.
