= Union Valley Reservoir =

Reservoir in El Dorado County, California

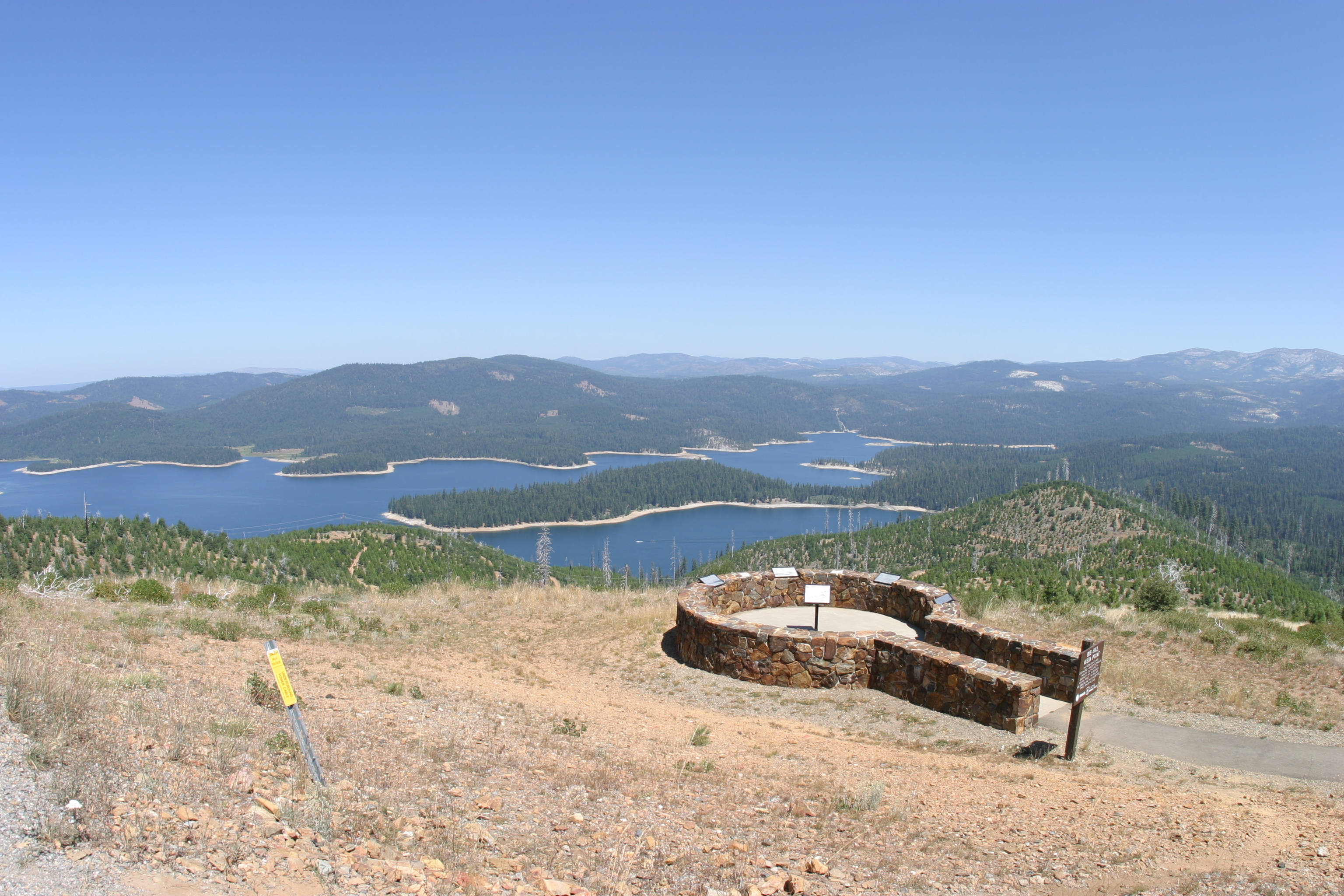
- Union Valley Reservoir, from Big Hill Lookout

- Location within California Location within the United States
- Location: El Dorado County, California
- Coordinates: 38.87°N 120.42°W
- Type: reservoir
- Primary inflows: Silver Creek
- Primary outflows: Silver Creek
- Basin countries: United States
- Surface area: 2,890.24 acres (1,169.64 ha)
- Water volume: 277,000 acre⋅ft (342,000,000 m^{3})
- Surface elevation: 4,870 ft (1,480 m)

Union Valley Reservoir is a reservoir in eastern El Dorado County, California, about 20 miles (32 km) northeast of Placerville. The 277,000 acre-feet (342,000,000 m^{3}) lake is in Eldorado National Forest in the Sierra Nevada at an elevation of 4,870 feet (1,480 m).

It was formed in 1963 (63 years ago) by the 453-foot (138 m) high earth and rockfill Union Valley Dam on Silver Creek, which is a tributary of the American River. The reservoir is part of the Upper American River Project of the Sacramento Municipal Utility District, a public electric utility, which operates the dam and many other dams in the area. Recreation such as boating, fishing and camping is available there.

It stores snow melt runoff during the spring and releases it during the summer when electrical demand is greatest to a chain of hydroelectric power plants downstream. Union Valley Powerhouse at the base of the dam has a capacity of 46.7 MW and is operated as a peaking power plant, supplying electricity during times of the greatest demand. Consumptive rights to the water itself are held by the City of Sacramento, California.

The reservoir is fed by Big Silver Creek, Jones Fork Silver Creek, Tells Creek, Wench Creek and the outflows of Robbs Peak and Jones Fork powerhouses. Jones Fork Powerhouse is not on Jones Fork Silver Creek but instead conveys water from Ice House Reservoir. Robbs Peak Powerhouse gets its water from the Middle Fork American River headwaters, by way of Loon Lake Reservoir, and small reservoirs on Gerle Creek and South Fork Rubicon River. Downstream from Union Valley Dam, Silver Creek waters are largely diverted through two additional powerhouses below small reservoirs before joining the South Fork American River a few miles north of Pollock Pines, California. Silver Creek was an intermittent creek before the development of Union Valley Reservoir and the diversions from the Middle Fork American River.

== See also ==
- List of dams and reservoirs in California
- List of lakes in California
- List of largest reservoirs of California
- List of the tallest dams in the United States
