= Sacramento Municipal Utility District =

Publicly owned electric utility

- Type: Municipal
- Industry: Electricity
- Founded: 1923
- Headquarters: SMUD Headquarters Building; Sacramento, California, United States
- Revenue: ▲US$ 1.954 Billion (2023)
- Operating income: ▼US$ 183 Million (2023)
- Net income: ▲US$ 220 Million (2023)
- Number of employees: 2,343 (2023)
- Website: www.smud.org

The Sacramento Municipal Utility District (SMUD) is a community-owned electric utility serving Sacramento County and parts of Placer County. It is one of the ten largest publicly owned utilities in the United States, generating the bulk of its power through natural gas (estimated 35.2% of production total in 2020) and large hydroelectric generation plants (29.1% in 2020). SMUD's green power (renewable) energy output was estimated as 33.8% in 2020.

SMUD owned the Rancho Seco Nuclear Generating Station nuclear power plant, shut down by a vote of the utility's rate-payers in the late 1980s. Although the nuclear plant is now decommissioned, its now-unused iconic towers remain on the site. Solar arrays and the 500-megawatt Cosumnes gas-fired plant have risen in proximity to the towers.

SMUD's headquarters building, built in the late 1950s on the edge of the East Sacramento neighborhood, is notable for its mural by Sacramento artist Wayne Thiebaud. The mural wraps around the ground floor of the building and is accessible to the public. It is one of the earliest major works by the artist, and remains his largest installation to date.

== History ==
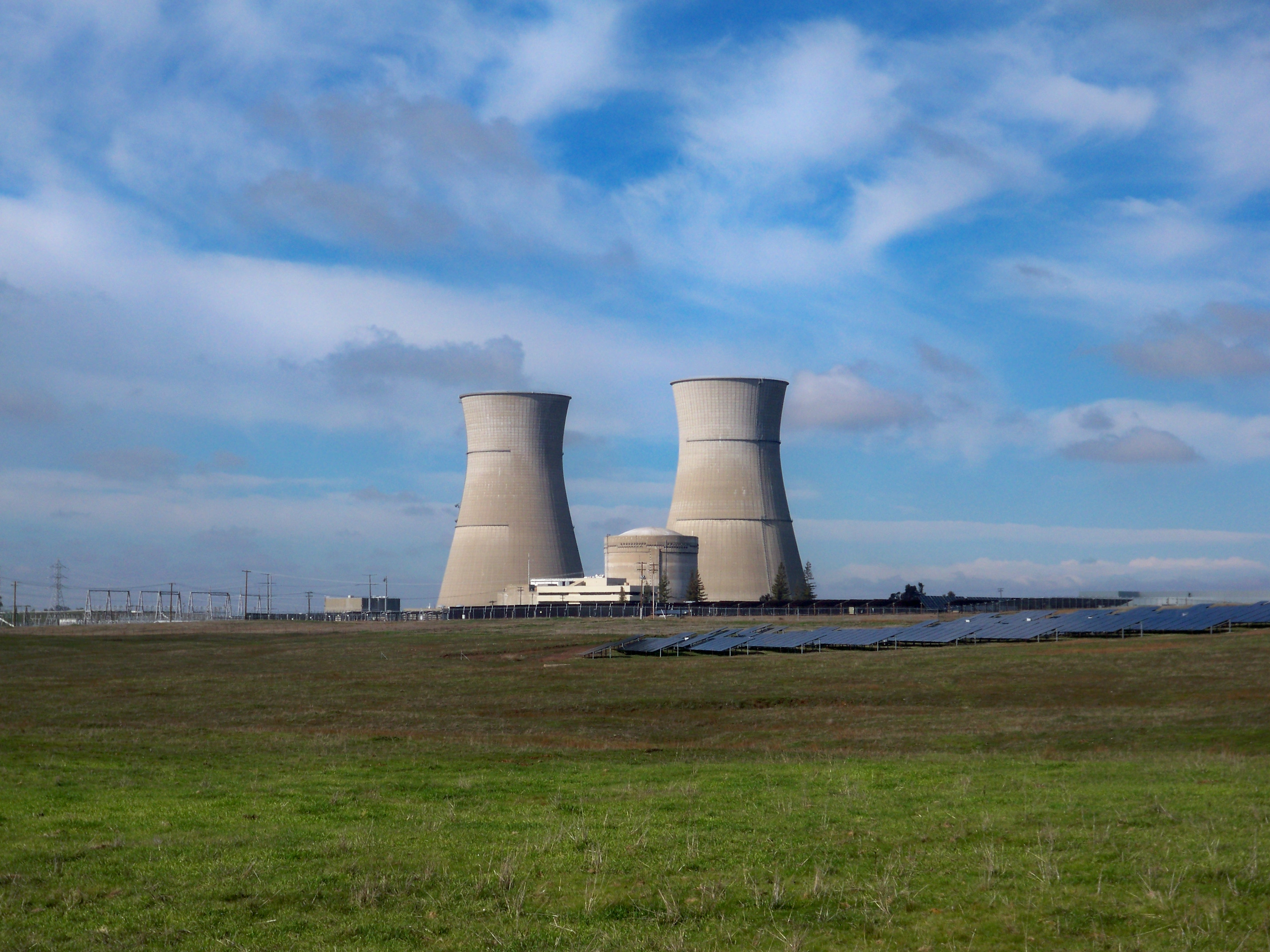
The decommissioned Rancho Seco Nuclear Generating Station

Created by a vote of Sacramento County residents in 1923 pursuant to the Municipal Utility District Act, SMUD's ability to provide power to its customer-owners was delayed in the courts for 23 years by the investor-owned Pacific Gas & Electric Company (PG&E). A court ruling eventually sided with SMUD, which began providing power at the beginning of 1946. SMUD is a public agency of the State of California, and as such is not subject to the Federal Energy Regulatory Commission's jurisdiction under the Federal Power Act. Echoes of SMUD's fight to fulfill its original mandate from the voters have continued in more recent turf battles with PG&E. In the 1980s, residents of Folsom voted to join SMUD, with PG&E fighting the annexation in the courts. Folsom rate-payers are now part of SMUD. In 2006, PG&E successfully convinced SMUD rate-payers and rate-payers in Yolo County to vote down an annexation proposal that would have extended the public utility's service territory to include the Yolo County cities of West Sacramento, Davis and Woodland, along with territory between the three cities.

In February 2020, SMUD was among 75 project customers that received permanent federal water contracts for the Central Valley Project.

== Governance ==
SMUD is governed by a seven-member Board of Directors. Each member is elected by residents in a "ward" or constituency for four-year terms. As of January 2024 the directors were:

- Brandon Rose, Ward 1
- Nancy Bui-Thompson, Ward 2
- Gregg Fishman, Ward 3, Board Vice President
- Rosanna Herber, Ward 4, Board President
- Rob Kerth, Ward 5
- David Tamayo, Ward 6
- Heidi Sanborn, Ward 7

== Facilities ==
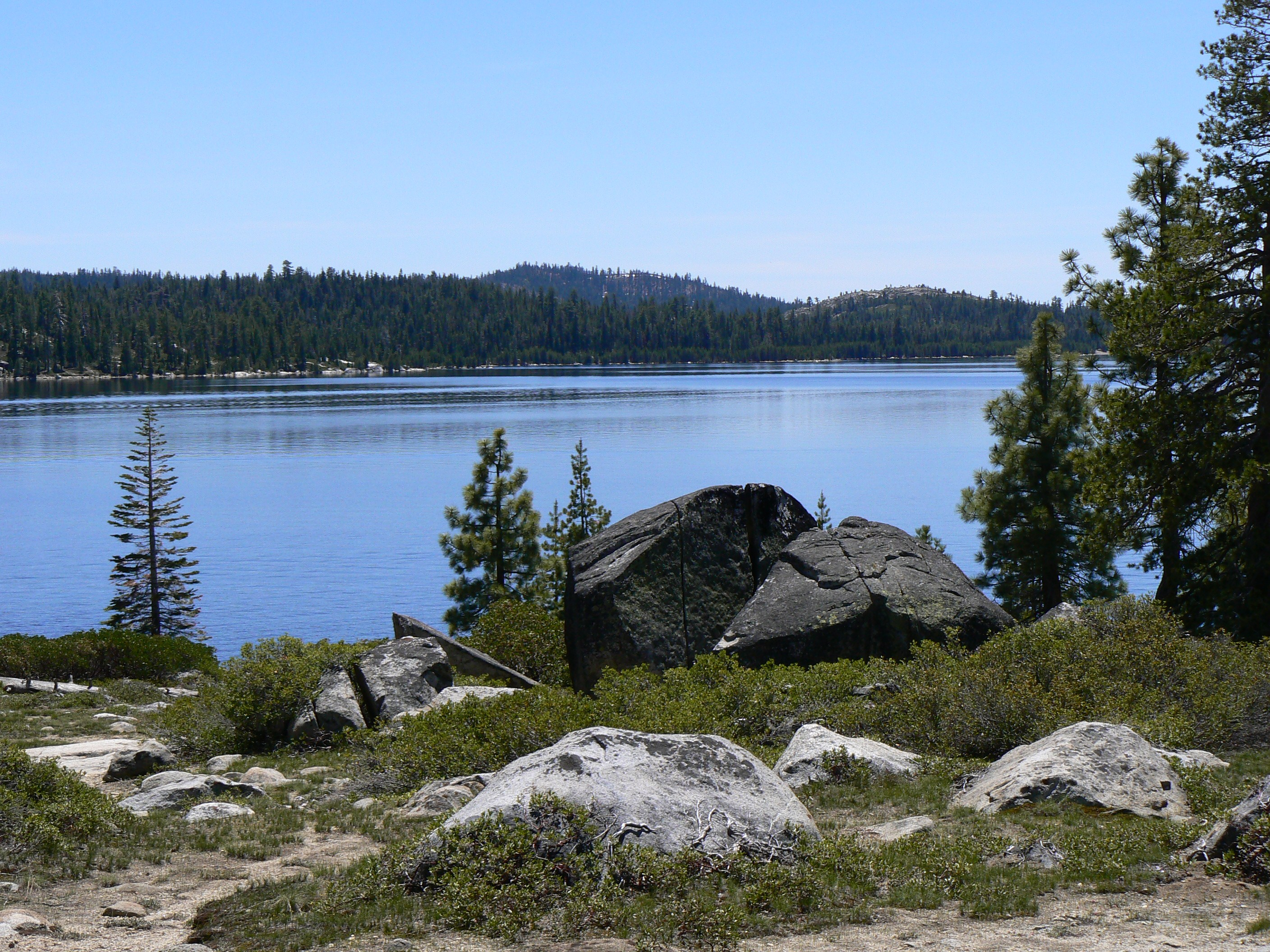
Loon Lake Reservoir

SMUD's electricity generation capacity derives from the watershed of the South Fork of the American River, called the "Upper American River Project (UARP)" in federal licensing documents. The project is an extensive complex of multiple retention dams, diversion dams, reservoirs, canals, tunnels and hydroelectric powerplants. The plants are run during hours of peak demand, though retaining sufficient flood control capacity dictates water releases to some extent.

From upstream to downstream, the District's UARP assets include:

- Rubicon Dam and Reservoir, 1,450 acre-feet (1.8 million cubic meters)
- Buck Island Dam and Reservoir, 1,070 acre⋅ft (1.3 million m^{3})
- Loon Lake Dam and Reservoir, built 1963, 76,200 acre⋅ft (94 million m^{3})
- Gerle Creek Dam and Reservoir, 1,260 acre⋅ft (1.6 million m^{3})
- Robbs Peak Reservoir, 30 acre⋅ft (37 thousand m^{3})
- Ice House Dam and Reservoir, 45,960 acre⋅ft (57 million m^{3})
- Union Valley Dam and Reservoir, built 1963, 277,290 acre⋅ft (340 million m^{3})
- Junction Dam and Reservoir, 3,250 acre⋅ft (4.0 million m^{3})
- Camino Dam and Reservoir, 825 acre⋅ft (1.0 million m^{3})
- Brush Creek Dam and Reservoir, 1,530 acre⋅ft (1.9 million m^{3})
- Slab Creek Dam and Reservoir, 16,600 acre⋅ft (20 million m^{3})

SMUD owns the first of potentially two natural gas power plants (the Cosumnes Power Plant, brought online in 2006 on property adjacent to the decommissioned Rancho Seco nuclear facility) as well as wind-powered and solar-powered electric generation facilities. In addition, the utility owns some small gas-fired peaker plants for meeting the highest energy demands, typically on Sacramento's notably blistering summer days.

With multiple direct line connections to the historic Brighton Substation, SMUD can also draw capacity from hydroelectric power generated on the North Fork Feather River's Stairway of Power system.

SMUD is in the Advisory Council of the PHEV Research Center.
