= Loon Lake (California) =

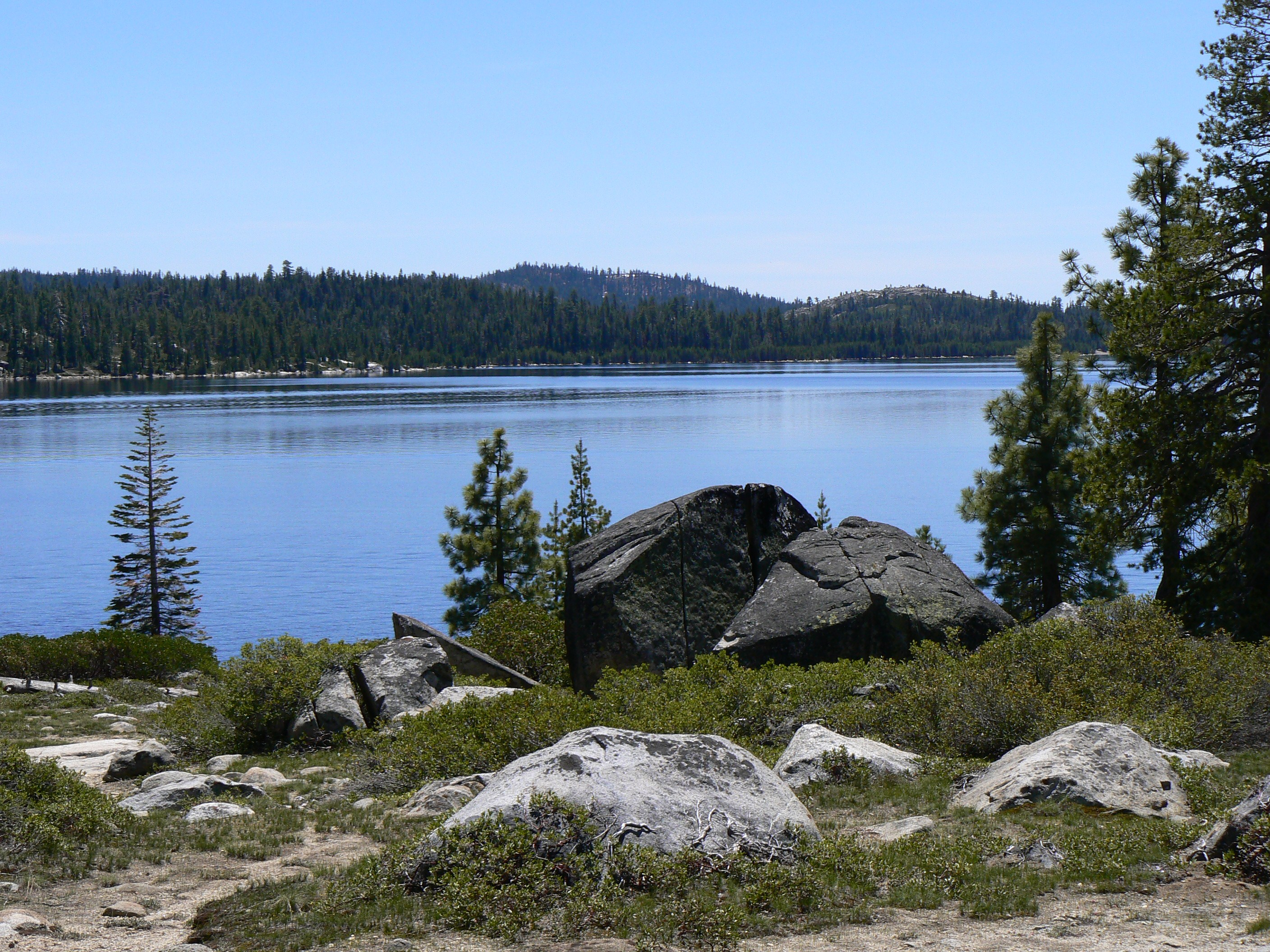

- Location within California Location within the United States
- Location: Eldorado National Forest; El Dorado County, California
- Coordinates: 38.988°N 120.331°W
- Type: Reservoir
- Primary inflows: Buck-Loon Tunnel
- Primary outflows: Gerle Creek
- Catchment area: 5,200 acres (2,100 ha)
- Basin countries: United States
- Max. length: 3.5 mi (5.6 km)
- Surface area: 1,100 acres (450 ha)
- Water volume: 76,200 acre⋅ft (94,000 dam^{3})
- Surface elevation: 6,410 ft (1,950 m)
- References: U.S. Geological Survey Geographic Names Information System: Loon Lake

Loon Lake is a reservoir in the Eldorado National Forest of El Dorado County, California, United States. The 76,200 acre⋅ft (94,000,000 m^{3}) lake is formed by Loon Lake Dam, completed in 1963 (63 years ago) as part of the Upper American River Project by Sacramento Municipal Utility District to conserve spring snow melt runoff for use during the summer and autumn for hydroelectric power production. Loon Lake Dam impounds water at the headwaters of Gerle Creek which, prior to the dam, flowed intermittently through (natural) Loon and Pleasant Lakes. Most of the water now stored in Loon Lake arrives from Buck Island Reservoir in the adjacent Rubicon River watershed by way of the Buck-Loon Tunnel.

It is also known as Loon Lake Reservoir. Boaters refer to the northeast portion as the Pleasant Lake Arm, the portion over the inundated Pleasant Lake. In summer a boat ramp for water sports and camping are available, but the area is less popular than nearby Union Valley Reservoir and Rubicon Trail. On the western shore is Loon Lake Chalet, a popular recreation destination.

== History ==
=== Development ===
In 1884, Loon Lake Dam was constructed to provide summer and autumn water supply to Georgetown Ridge for mining. It was owned and operated by the Georgetown Divide Water Co. whom used it for irrigation and as a canal system from Gerle Creek to Georgetown Ridge. In 1943, E. F. Sullivan of the Bureau of Reclamation proposed that Loon Lake be used for matters of power generation. In 1948, the Georgetown Divide Public Utility District (GDPUD) applied for appropriative rights from the State of California to appropriate 260,000 acre-feet of water from the American River basin. This was in order to divert water through Loon Lake and Gerle Creek for purposes of irrigation, stock-watering and domestic use.

=== Water Rights ===
Originally, the Georgetown Divide Public Utility District (GDPUD) had obtained appropriative water rights from the State Water Resources Control Board. Also, GDPUD exercised pre-1914 rights for diversion of water from several tributaries of Pilot Creek in the South Fork American River. The Georgetown Divide Water Company and other water companies invested that included Sierra Pacific Power Company, Loon Lake Water and Power Company, California Water Company and the Pilot Creek Water Company claimed pre-1914 rights in the South Fork Rubicon and Pilot Creek drainages for years prior to the 20th century. These rights included storage in Loon Lake, diversion from South Fork Rubicon River, Gerle Creek and Pilot Creek and all its tributaries. The water storage in Loon Lake was diverted and re-diverted into a canal system which eventually made its way from the South Fork Rubicon drainage into Pilot Creek drainage.

A deed was signed in 1952 by GDPUD, whom paid for the rights and operation of all facilities in the Georgetown service area and the Georgetown Divide Water Company that included Loon Lake, diversions from Rubicon and Onion Creek to all Pilot Creek watersheds and diversions. Between the years of 1940 and 1950, Sacramento Municipal Utility District (SMUD) was interested in obtaining rights to facilities of the GDPUD in the South Fork Rubicon River watershed that included Loon Lake, for development of SMUD's Upper American River Project (UARP). In 1961, an agreement was made between SMUD and GDPUD and the associated rights to the South Fork Rubicon watershed were turned over. The pre-1914 water rights of the facilities in the Upper Rubicon watershed were also turned over to SMUD in the written deed. SMUD then applied for appropriative water rights in the Upper Rubicon watershed which included Loon Lake, diversions into Loon Lake and diversions out of the South Fork Rubicon basin into Silver Creek.

== Hydroelectric Project ==
The Upper American River Hydroelectric Project (UARP) was constructed by SMUD between 1959 and 1985 and began revenue operation in 1961. The watersheds that supply the UARP, encompassing some 674 square miles, are characterized by the mountains in the east and incised canyons in the west. Most of the UARP lies on Eldorado National Forest and includes eight powerhouses and 11 reservoirs.

=== Loon Lake Facility ===
Loon Lake Powerhouse is located more than 1,000 ft (300 m) below Loon Lake. It is similar in construction to Helms Power Plant and Eastwood Powerhouse near Fresno, California. The power plant discharges water through a long tunnel to Gerle Creek Reservoir. Electrical energy is conveyed using two transmission lines (69 kilovolts each) which share towers: one runs between Loon Lake and Robbs Peak switchyards and the other runs between Loon Lake and Union Valley switchyards.

=== Operation ===
SMUD uses Loon Lake along with the rest of its hydroelectric facilities for multiple purposes. The Loon Lake, Ice House and Union Valley Reservoirs provide about 90% of SMUD's water storage. In the mid-summer the reservoirs let out water storage when electric power demand is greatest; water is released during naturally drier periods mainly to provide whitewater recreation downstream. Rubicon Reservoir and Buck Island Lake capture and divert water to Loon Lake through Buck-Loon Tunnel. The storage at Loon Lake typically follows an annual cycle, increasing in the spring, reaching its highest point in the summer months. Through meeting in-stream flow commitments, whitewater boating requirements, and electrical system reliability needs over summer, the reservoir gradually lowers. This annual cycle allows for a fluctuation of around 36 feet water elevation.

=== CEQA ===
An appendix to the 2014 California Water Quality Certification details the mitigation associated with Loon Lake's impact on the geologic, aquatic and terrestrial resources of the former ecosystem as it was prior to the 1962 dams. Since the presence of the lake and the roads constructed to build the dams also induces recreational visitation, SMUD has constructed campground improvements and a winter recreational chalet. Some of these impacts include: varying water level, modified streamflow patterns affecting aquatic life communities, aesthetic resources, and human pathogen concentration due to recreation.

== Dams ==
Loon Lake Main Dam is a rockfill structure that is 0.4 mi (0.64 km) long by 108 ft (33 m) high. It includes a 250 ft (76 m) long side channel spillway on the right bank. Appurtenant structures include the 910 ft (280 m) long by 95 ft (29 m) rockfill Loon Lake Auxiliary Dam on the west shore and a small earthfill dike on the northeast shore. Construction of the present dam began in 1962 with the dismantling of an older dam at the same site, constructed in 1872.

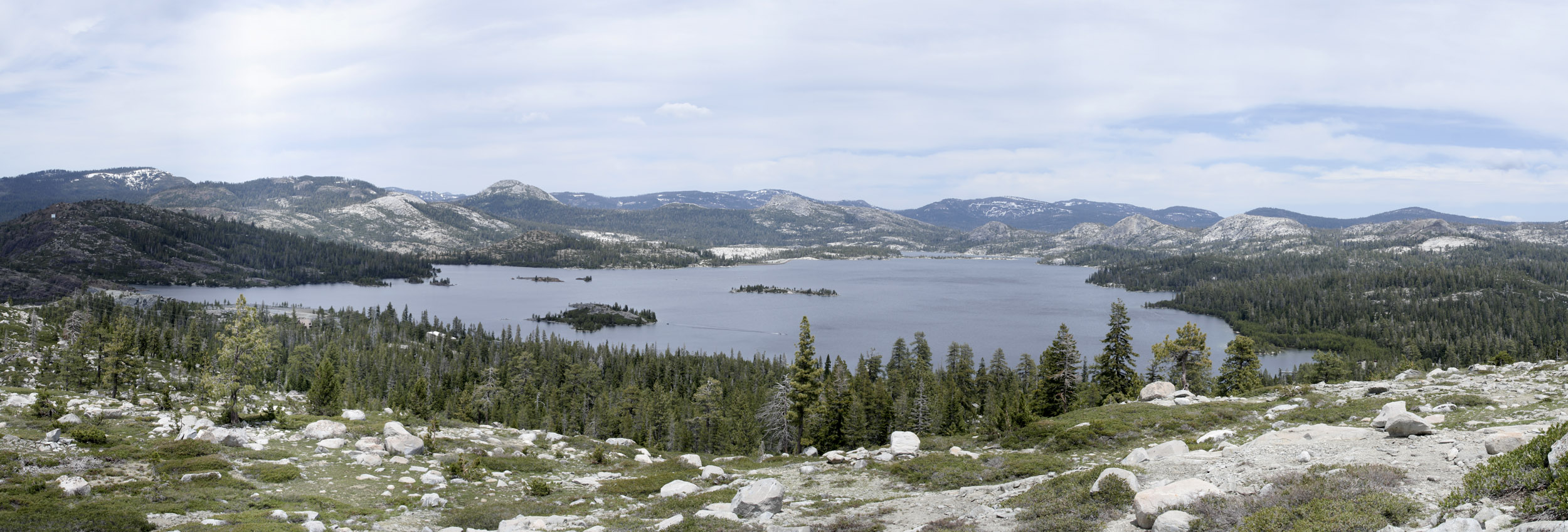
Loon Lake

== Water Quality ==
Loon Lake water sampling takes place at different water surface elevations and is carried out by SMUD. It is collected at four times during the year, first major rain, spring runoff, summer low flow and fall turnover. A historical sampling took place in mid year 2000 near the mouth of Loon Lake Tunnel-Buck Island. The water flowing inward from Ellis Creek reported 21 °C and 11 °C directly from the Buck Island location. The sampling results show that Loon Lake Reservoir is a cold, clear and well oxygenated body of water. Maximum surface temperatures 13° and 15 °C and minimum temperatures were around 8 °C. Dissolved oxygen levels between 1999 and 2000 were between 8 and 9 mg/L throughout the water body. These results are consistent with past samples taken and show that Loon Lake Reservoir is close to or at 100 percent saturation. Other tests have shown that the reservoir also shows persistent clarity and that up to 36 feet in depth there is transparency.

== Riparian Areas ==
The Upper American River Project reservoirs including Loon Lake have vegetation that is considered upland type. Wetlands associated with these reservoirs are characterized by steep slope and well-drained substrates. The specific vegetation and terrain that is common there are mixed/conifer and fir trees, Huckleberry Oak, barren/rocky areas along the shoreline, wet meadows scattered throughout and Lodgepole Pines. There are two main types of wetlands that are common in this area, one of which is the lakeshore-basin meadow for seasonally and persistently flooded shorelines and there is the depressional meadows within swales. The largest wetland area is at the north end of the reservoir where it may contribute to the wetland conditions because of the accumulation of snowmelt and inundation from inflows. The total amount of area of wetland in the Loon Lake Reservoir is about 38 acres.

== Amenities ==
- Camping

The Loon Lake Campground is located on Highway 50 on Ice House Road on the South side of Loon Lake, about 23 miles east of Placerville. The campsite sits approximately at 6,500 ft elevation. Loon Lake Campground is typically open from mid July to mid October and the maximum number of nights you can stay possible is 14 (annually). Single campsites only allow up to 1 vehicle and up to 6 people. There are 53 campsites total and reservations can be made at Recreation.gov.

- Rubicon Trail

The Rubicon Trail is a 4-wheel drive route that spans a total distance of 22 miles. The off-highway-vehicle segment of this trail is available near the base of Loon Lake Main Dam.

- Fishing

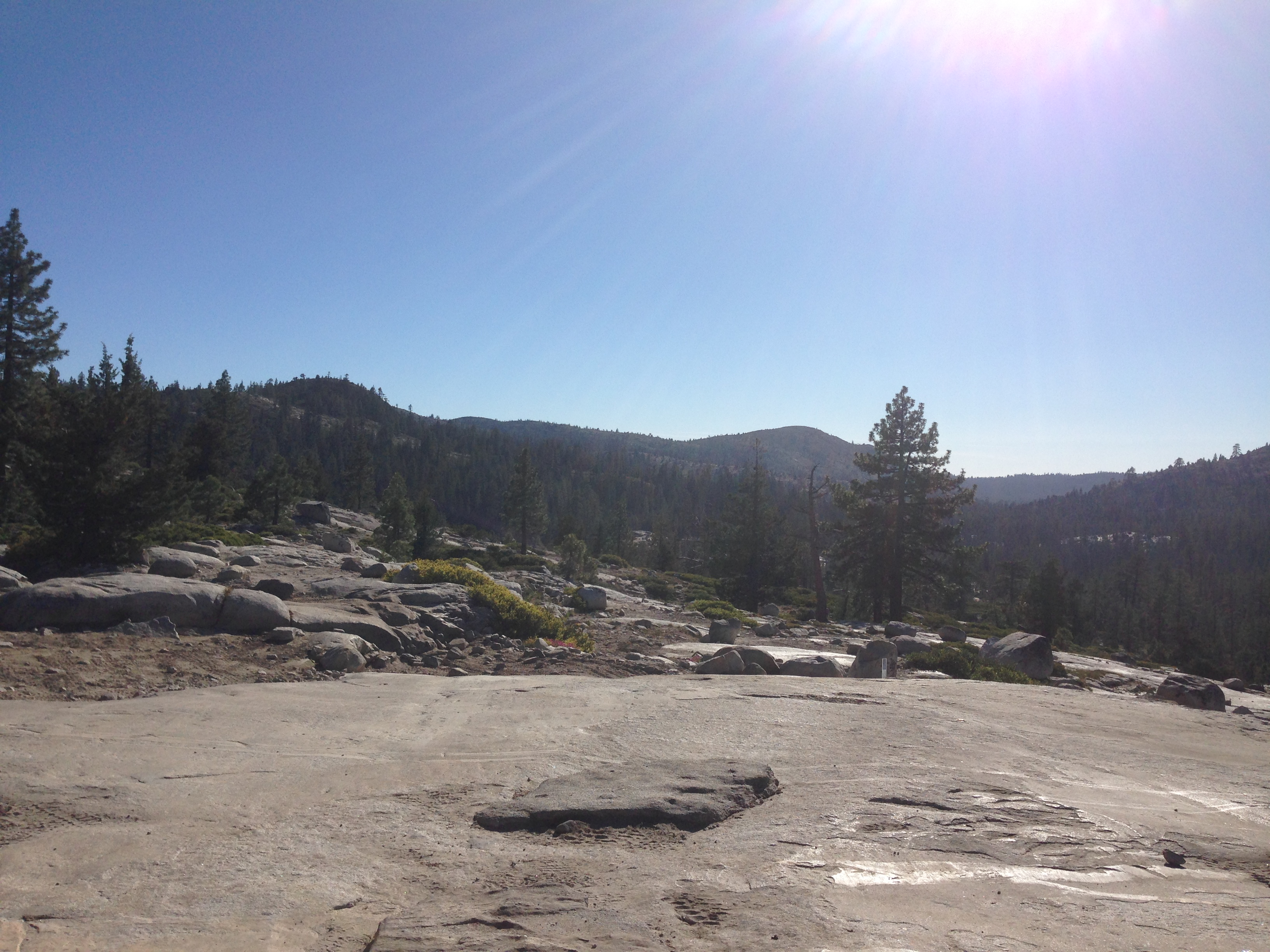
Rubicon Trail

Rainbow trout is released every other week by the Department of Fish and Game

Ice fishing is available January through early March most years.

- Boating

A boat ramp is available near the campground, and an informal boat put-in is along the northwest shore.

- Hiking

A trail from the Loon Lake Campground to the boat-in Pleasant Campground is popular. Beyond is access to the Desolation Wilderness.

- Winter Recreation

SMUD regularly plows the road leading to Loon Lake Chalet and its parking lot.

== See also ==
- List of dams and reservoirs in California
- List of lakes in California
