= Auburn-Folsom South Unit =

US power and water management project

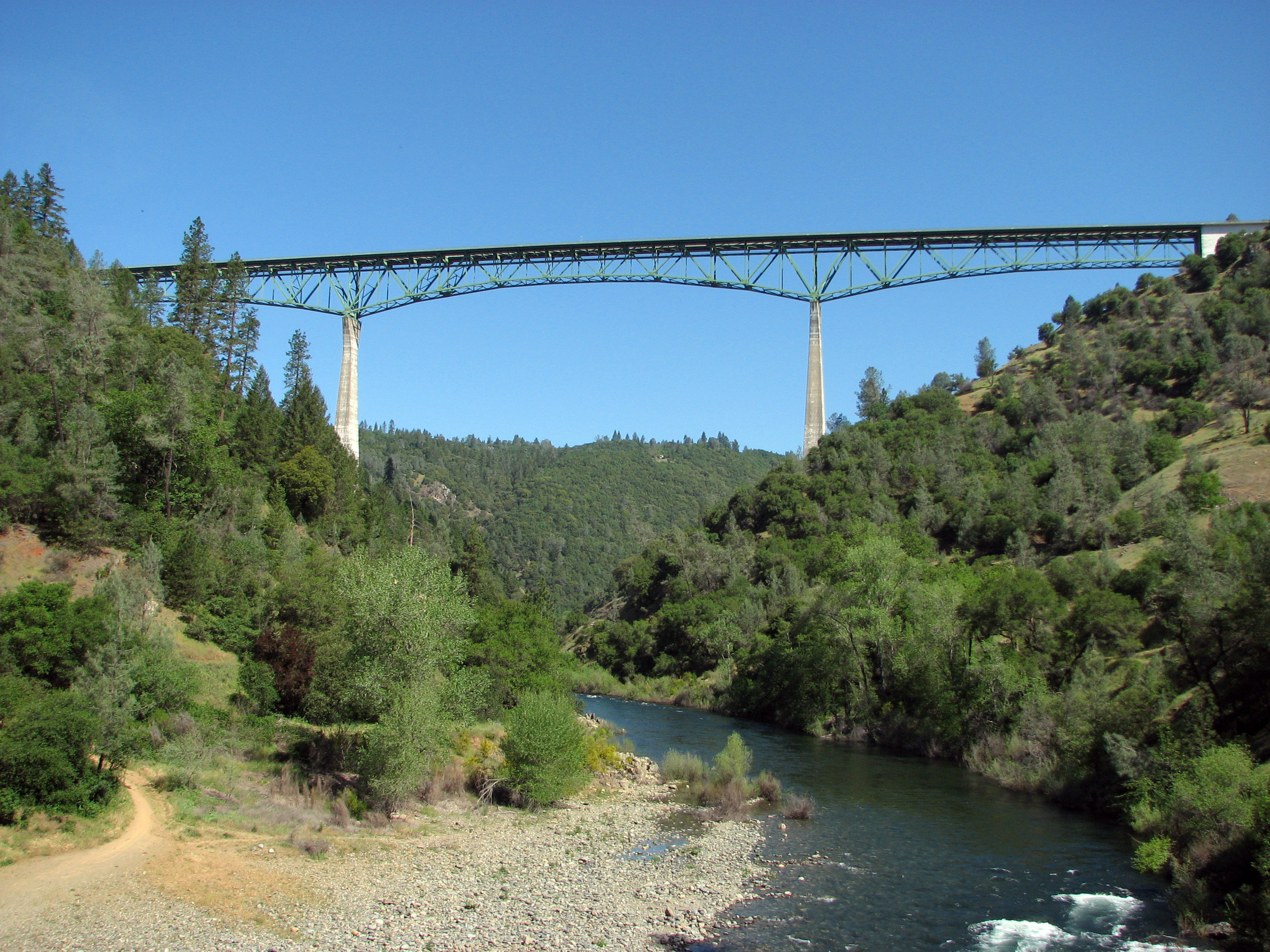
The Foresthill Bridge was constructed as part of a road diversion in response to the Auburn Dam.

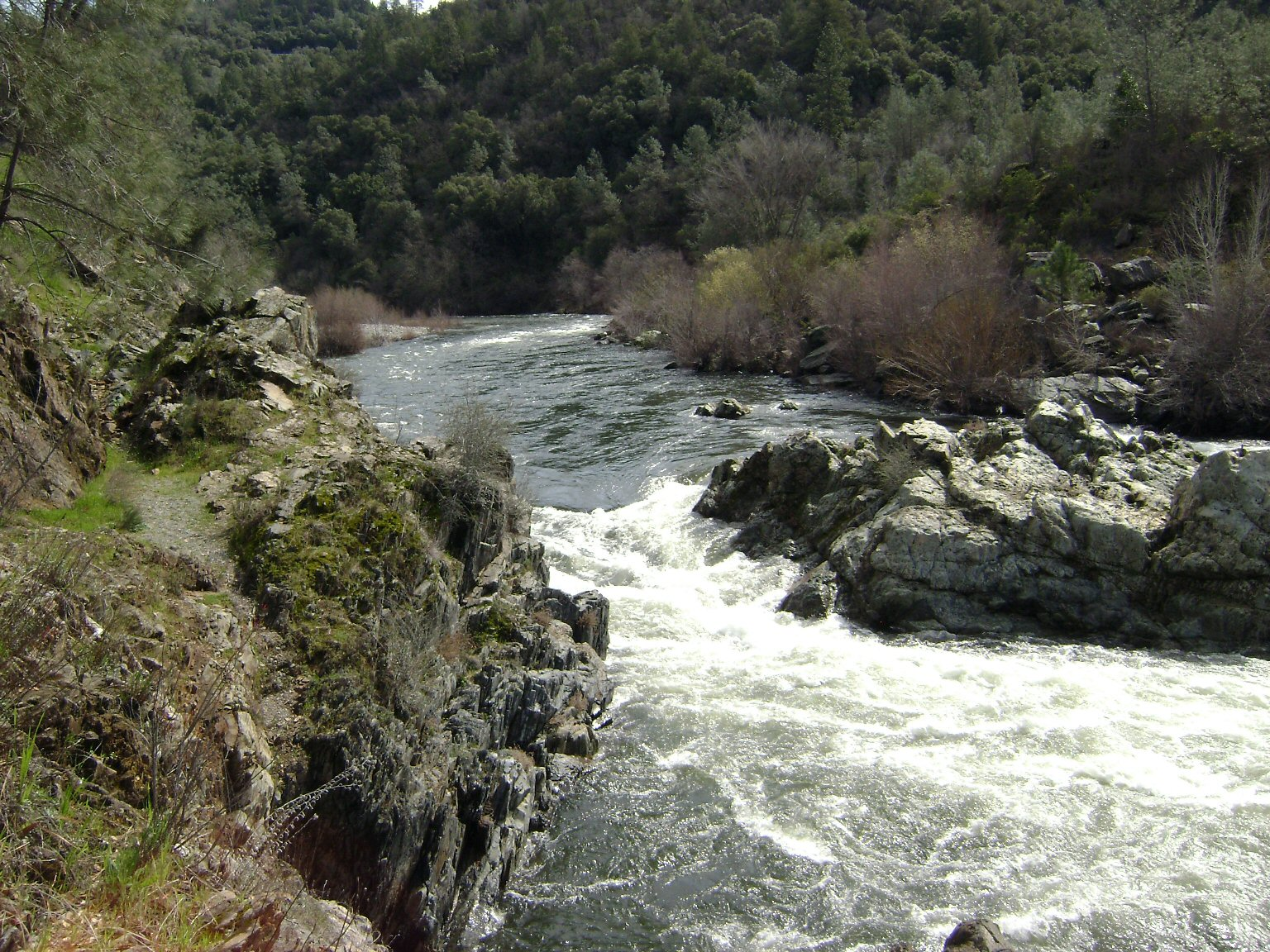
The American River near Auburn, California.

The Auburn-Folsom South Unit is a project associated with the Central Valley Project in California and is one of three units located on the American River in Northern California, the United States Bureau of Reclamation is in charge of the Central Valley Project, including this project. The initial budget for this unit was 1.5 billion dollars. This unit includes a number of dams located on the American River, and work to divert and manage water in the area. The associated features of the Auburn-Folsom South Unit include the Folsom South Canal which was designed to change the direction of water flow at the Nimbus Dam along the American River near Sacramento in Northern California, Auburn Dam which was proposed to be built in the city of Auburn, California, the Sugar Pine Dam located in Placer County, and the County Line Dam and associated features of which construction was never initiated. The South Unit was approved by law in 1965, although actual construction of the projects did not begin until 1967. Some of the projects initially proposed to be a part of the unit were never halted once construction began, or were never started at all.

== Significance ==
This project goals include the need for water for irrigation, municipal uses, and industrial needs and demands in the area. This project also has associated significance toward groundwater depletion in the area, as part of its original construction goals were to help provide water supply in order to lessen the depleting groundwater supplies. The intended use for the water diverted utilizing the Folsom South Canal is for a multitude of purposes, predominantly being irrigation and municipal, which is in accordance with the Central Valley Project. Not only does the constructed section of canal have human uses and support in mind, but the Auburn-Folsom South Unit was also constructed with goals of creating hydrological energy generation. As well as power, there was goals to provide protection to fish species as well as recreation.

== Construction ==
The Sugar Pine Dam is the only proposed feature of the Auburn-Folsom South Unit that has been completed, this dam supplies fresh drinking water to the Foresthill, California area. The Folsom South Canal was worked on and roughly 27 miles of the proposed 68.8 miles of the canal was built in the 70's, however, further construction of the structure was halted. The Auburn Dam, of which there was a lot of concern and controversy over, was started but then was never fully constructed. The County Line Dam construction was never initiated.

== Environmental impact ==
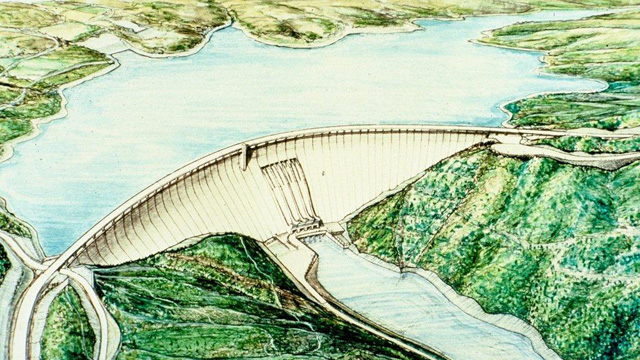
Concept drawing of the uncompleted Auburn Dam.

When this project was initially proposed, there came with it a good amount of backlash and controversy about the project. In the early 1980s, there was a good amount of discontent surrounding the project, as many thought that the project was not economically justified. The main source of controversy surrounding this project was the Auburn Dam. The Auburn Dam created a lot of safety concerns because of its unusual design, the dam was to be high and relatively thin, it would be designed as an arch dam and people were concerned about the unusual shape and curvature of the infrastructure. The dam created a lot of concerns over how it would handle seismic activity. An earthquake in Oroville, California sparked concern over the Auburn Dam and several scientific groups advised against original design plans for the dam and suggested reconsidering the dam in general. Not only was there concern over how the Auburn Dam would handle a potential seismic event, but the dam design also would require a considerable amount of road relocation and bridge construction in order to deal with these changes. The Foresthill Bridge was constructed as a result of road diversions because of the construction of the Auburn Dam. This bridge was designed and constructed by the Bureau of Reclamation and is the second tallest bridge ever constructed by the department. In regards to the Folsom South Canal, although the structure was started it was eventually halted due to concerns over minimum flows of the American River in regard to fishery and recreational use. There was to be a relationship between the Auburn Dam and reservoir and the Folsom South Canal. The Auburn Reservoir was designed to power the Auburn Power plant with hydroelectric power, this release of water from the Auburn Reservoir would then provide water to the Folsom South Canal.
