= Auburn State Recreation Area =

State park in California, United States

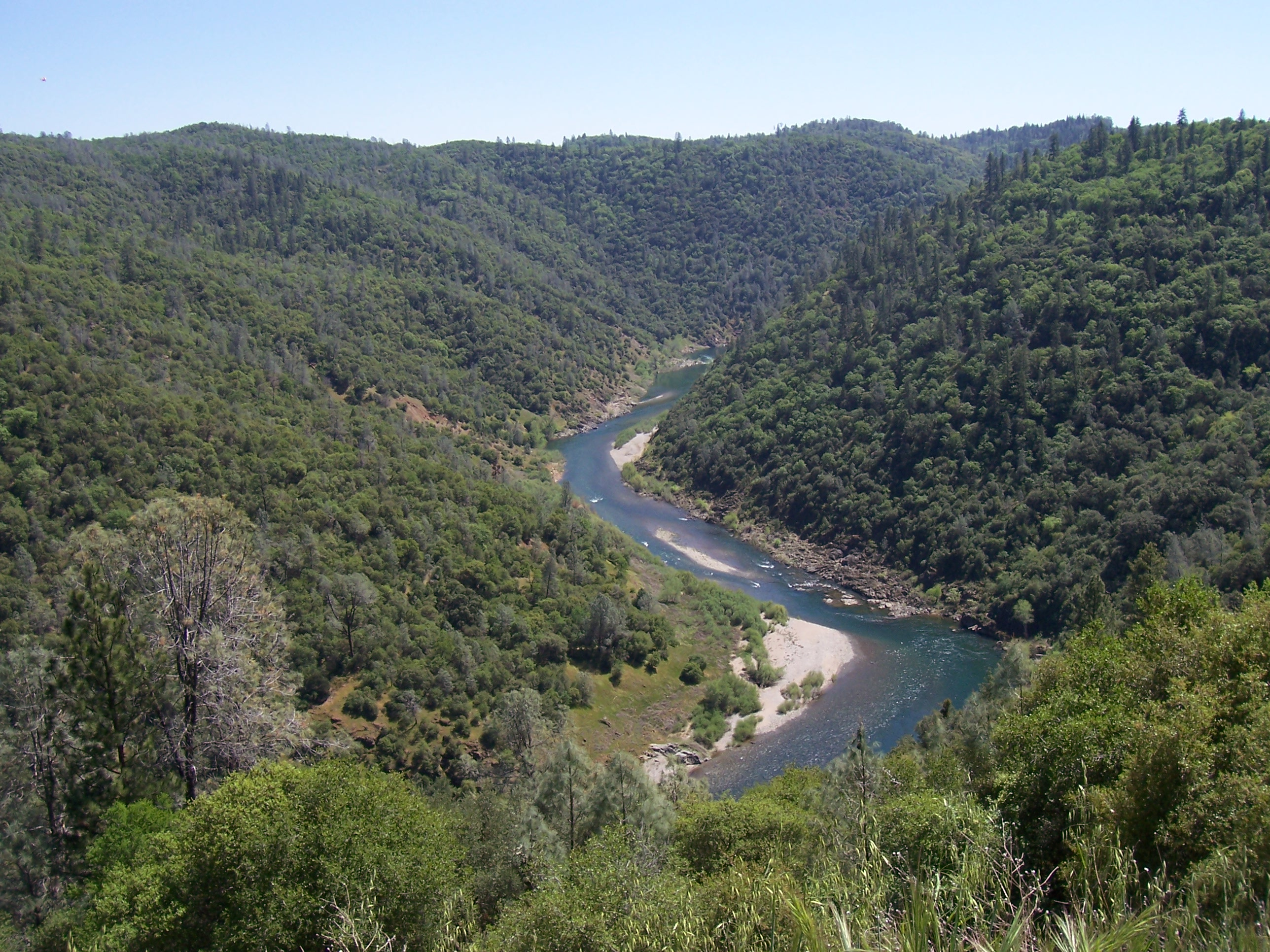
- Auburn State Recreation Area from California State Route 49

- Location within California Location within the United States
- Location: El Dorado & Placer Counties, California, United States
- Nearest city: Auburn, California
- Coordinates: 38°54′57″N 121°2′28″W
- Area: 42,377 acres (171.49 km^{2})
- Established: 1966
- Governing body: California Department of Parks and Recreation

Auburn State Recreation Area is a state park unit of California, along 40 miles (64 km) of the North and Middle Forks of the American River. The state recreation area (SRA) is situated on the border of Placer and El Dorado Counties in the heart of historic Gold Country. The largest city with close proximity is the city of Auburn. Once teeming with gold mining activity, the area now offers a wide variety of outdoor recreational opportunities. Major recreational uses include trail running, hiking, swimming, boating, fishing, camping, mountain biking, gold panning, horseback riding, road bicycling, and off-highway motorcycle riding. Whitewater recreation is also very popular on both forks of the river, with Class II, III and IV runs. Auburn SRA is also known as the location of a number of endurance races that are hosted throughout the year.

== History ==
Auburn SRA comprises lands set aside for the proposed Auburn Dam. However a large earthquake at Oroville nearby was found to have been caused by the Oroville Dam at that location, which led to examination and discovery that the Auburn dam site is situated on a geologic fault. This discovery halted the Auburn Dam project because of fears that constructing a dam and lake would cause a reservoir-induced earthquake which could lead to a dam's collapse, with catastrophic consequences for the city of Sacramento lying directly below. As such the project has been abandoned. The project had required the acquisition of 40,000 acres of land, much of it privately held, potentially against the will of long-term inhabitants; prior to the end of the project, 20,000 acres was taken. There is an upside, as a result of the surplus land taken for the project, millions of people now enjoy the Auburn State Recreation Area in its natural state, with multiple wilderness canyons offering access to one of the last remaining natural river systems in Central California. The California Department of Parks and Recreation administers the area under a contract with the United States Bureau of Reclamation.

== Endurance races ==
The state park is host to a number of sporting endurance events with the City of Auburn declaring itself as the "Endurance Capital of the World." Endurance held within the park include the Western States Endurance Run, Western States Trail Ride also known as Tevis Cup Equestrian Ride, American River 50 Mile Endurance Run, American River 50 Mile Equestrian Ride, Way Too Cool 50 Kilometer Endurance Run, Auburn International Half Iron Triathlon, Auburn Century 100 Mile Bike Ride, Coolest 24 Hour Mountain Bike Ride, Rio Del Lago 100 Mile Endurance Run, Sierra Nevada 50 Mile Endurance Run, and the Coolest Run: Ride & Tie.

== Media appearances ==
- A stunt from the 2002 film XXX was filmed in the park, in which a Corvette is driven off the Foresthill Bridge while the driver parachutes to safety.
- The 2005 book Nature Noir: A Park Ranger's Patrol in the Sierra recounted author Jordan Fisher Smith's experiences as a park ranger at Auburn SRA.

== See also ==
- List of California state parks
