= Auburn Dam =

Former proposed dam in California

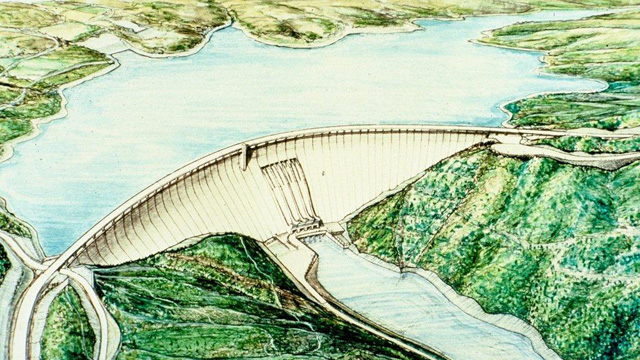
- A concept drawing of the Auburn Dam, from the U.S. Army Corps of Engineers

- Location of the proposed dam in California
- Interactive map of Auburn Dam
- Country: United States
- Location: Near Auburn, California
- Coordinates: 38°52′55″N 121°03′43″W
- Purpose: Flood mitigation; water supply; power generation; recreation
- Status: Proposed; commenced; incomplete; abandoned
- Construction began: 19 October 1968
- Construction cost: $431 million
- Owner: U.S. Bureau of Reclamation

Dam and spillways
- Type of dam: Concrete gravity-arch
- Impounds: North Fork American River
- Height (foundation): 680 ft (210 m)
- Length: 4,100 ft (1,200 m)

Reservoir
- Creates: Auburn Reservoir
- Total capacity: 2,300,000 acre⋅ft (2,800 GL)
- Surface area: 10,000 acres (4,000 ha)

Power Station
- Installed capacity: 200–750 MW (270×10^{3}–1,010×10^{3} hp) (Note: proposed.)

Auburn Dam was a proposed concrete arch dam on the North Fork of the American River east of the town of Auburn, California, in the United States, on the border of Placer and El Dorado Counties. Slated to be completed in the 1970s by the U.S. Bureau of Reclamation, it would have been the tallest concrete dam in California and one of the tallest in the United States, at a height of 680 feet (210 m) and storing 2,300,000 acre-feet (2,800 GL) of water. Straddling a gorge downstream of the confluence of the North and Middle Forks of the American River and upstream of Folsom Lake, it would have regulated water flow and provided flood control in the American River basin as part of Reclamation's immense Central Valley Project.

The dam was first proposed in the 1950s; construction work commenced in 1968, involving the diversion of the North Fork American River through a tunnel and the construction of a massive earthen cofferdam. Following a nearby earthquake and the discovery of an unrelated seismic fault that underlay the dam site, work on the project was halted for fears that the dam's design would not allow it to survive a major quake on the same fault zone. Although the dam was redesigned and a new proposal submitted by 1980, spiraling costs and limited economic justification put an end to the project until severe flooding in 1986 briefly renewed interest in Auburn's flood control potential. The California State Water Resources Control Board denied water rights for the dam project in 2008 due to lack of construction progress.

Although new proposals surfaced from time to time after the 1980s, the dam was never built for a number of reasons, including limited water storage capacity, geologic hazards, and potential harm to recreation and the local environment. Much of the original groundwork at the Auburn Dam site still exists, and up to 2007, the North Fork American River still flowed through the diversion tunnel that had been constructed in preparation for the dam. Reclamation and Placer County Water Agency completed a pump station project that year which blocked the tunnel, returned the river to its original channel, and diverted a small amount of water through another tunnel under Auburn to meet local needs. However, some groups continued to support construction of the dam, which they stated would provide important water regulation and flood protection.

== Background ==
Starting in the 1850s during the California Gold Rush, the city of Sacramento rapidly grew around the confluence of the Sacramento River and its tributary the American River, near the middle of the Central Valley of California. The city's increasing population necessitated the construction of an extensive system of levees on the two rivers to prevent flooding. These early flood control works were insufficient; in 1862, the city was inundated so completely that the state government was temporarily moved to San Francisco. In 1955, the U.S. Army Corps of Engineers built the Folsom Dam at the confluence of the North and South Forks of the American River to provide flood control for the Sacramento metropolitan area. However, the Folsom Dam, with a capacity of just 1 million acre-feet (1,200 GL) compared to the annual American River flow of 2.7 million acre-feet (3,300 GL), proved inadequate. A flood in 1955 filled the Folsom Reservoir to capacity, before the dam was completed; and it has filled many times since. However, increased water uses and diversions, requirements for 200-year flood control, and joint system operations have increased seasonal flood capacity in Folsom Lake.

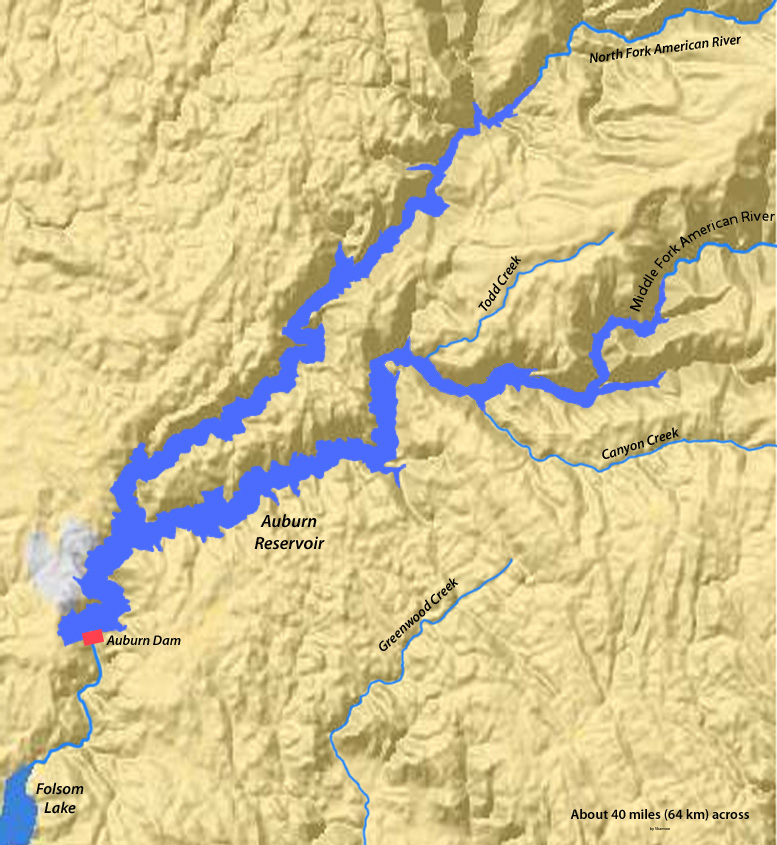
Map of the extent of the Auburn Reservoir

The demand for irrigation water in the Sacramento area and other parts of the Central Valley were also growing. In 1854, a diversion dam was constructed on the North Fork American River at the site of Auburn Dam, to divert water into ditches that supplied downstream farms. Irrigation with dam and canal systems was favored because the seasonal nature of the American River caused floods in some years and droughts in others. A large dam at the Auburn site was thus considered for both flood control and water supply. In the 1950s, the Bureau of Reclamation created the first plans for a high dam at Auburn. Several designs, ranging from earth-fill to concrete gravity dams, were considered. Before the dam could be built, the Auburn-Foresthill Road – which crosses the river just upstream of the dam site – had to be relocated. Even before the project was authorized, contracts were let for the construction of a high bridge to carry the road over the proposed reservoir, as well as preliminary excavations at the dam site.

The eventual design of Auburn Dam called for the creation of a reservoir with 2,300,000 acre-feet (2,800 GL) of capacity, more than twice that of Folsom Lake. The extra storage would greatly reduce the flood risk to Sacramento. The dam was to be the principal feature of the Auburn-Folsom South Unit of the Central Valley Project, with the purpose to "provide new and supplemental water for irrigation, municipal and industrial use, and to replenish severely depleted ground water in the Folsom South region". Congress authorized the project in 1965; the targeted completion date was 1973.

As the Auburn Dam proposal evolved, the project transformed from a primary flood-control structure to a multipurpose high dam that would serve various other purposes including long-term water storage, hydroelectricity generation, and recreation. One of the first ideas, publicized in the late 1950s, called for a 515-foot (157 m) embankment dam impounding 1,000,000 acre-feet (1,200 GL) of water. In 1963, a 690-foot (210 m) earthfill dam holding back 2,500,000 acre-feet (3,100 GL) of water was proposed. The pre-construction design was finalized in 1967, for a concrete thin-arch gravity structure over 680 feet (210 m) high. This dam would be 4,200 feet (1,300 m) long, 196 feet (60 m) thick at the base, and equipped with five 150-megawatt (200,000 hp) generators at its base for a total generating capacity of 700 megawatts (940,000 hp). Two concrete-lined flip bucket spillways would abut both sides of the dam. With the initial plans set and the project authorized, construction work for the dam started in late 1968.

== Construction ==
=== Site preparation ===
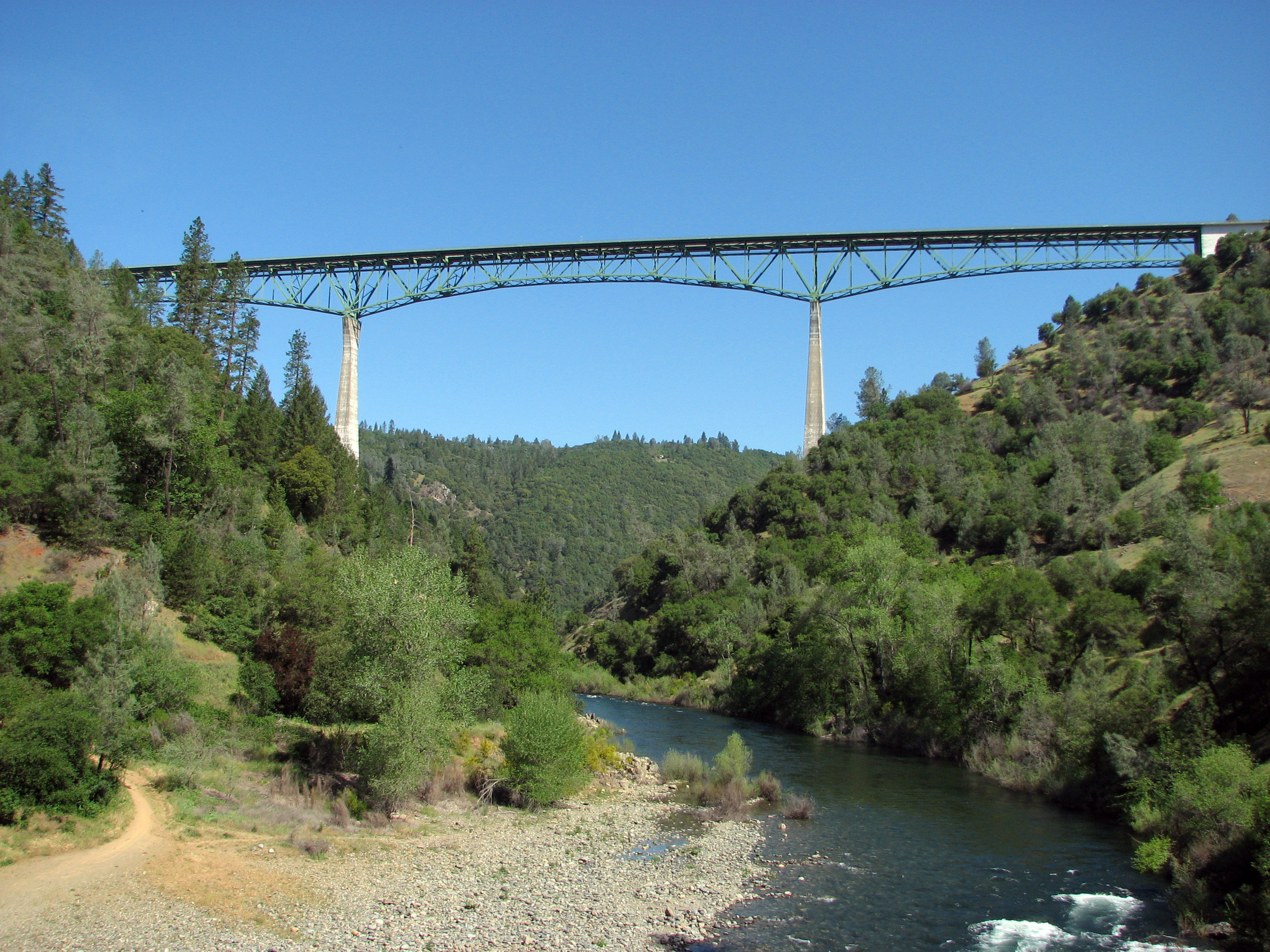
Foresthill Bridge, built in anticipation of the rising waters of Auburn Reservoir

Official groundbreaking of the Auburn Dam started on October 19, 1968, with preparatory excavations and test shafts drilled into the sides of the North Fork American River gorge. The contract for the diversion tunnel through the mountainside on river left, 33 feet (10 m) in diameter, 2,400 feet (730 m) long, and equipped to handle a flow of 74,000 cubic feet per second (2,100 m^{3}/s) (a roughly 35-year flood) was let to Walsh Western for about $5.1 million in 1968. The actual construction of the tunnel itself did not begin until mid-1971, and it was completed in late November 1972. One worker was killed during the excavation of the tunnel. In 1975, the earthen cofferdam for the Auburn project, 265 feet (81 m) high, was completed, diverting the river into the tunnel. The diversion tunnel bypassed a roughly 1-mile (1.6 km) section of the riverbed to allow construction of the main dam.

Upstream of the dam site, Auburn-Foresthill Road – one of the only all-weather thoroughfares of the region – would be inundated by the proposed reservoir. In preparation for the reservoir's filling, it was rerouted over a three-span, 2,428-foot-long (740 m) truss bridge rising 730 feet (220 m) above the river. Even though Auburn Dam would never be completed, the bridge was still required because the pool behind the cofferdam would flood the original river crossing. It also improved safety and reduced travel time by eliminating a steep, narrow and winding grade into the canyon on either side of the river, as comparisons to maps showing the old road alignment will attest. The contracts for various projects pertaining to the relocation of the roadway were given to O.K. Mittry and Sons, Hensel Phelps Construction Company, and Willamette-Western Corporation, the latter for the construction of the actual bridge. The Foresthill Bridge, the fourth highest bridge in the United States, was completed in 1973.

=== Earthquake and redesigning ===
In 1975, a magnitude 5.7 earthquake shook the Sierra Nevada near Oroville Dam, approximately 50 miles (80 km) north of the Auburn Dam construction site. This quake concerned geologists and engineers working on the project so much that the Auburn Dam construction was halted while the site was resurveyed and investigations conducted into the origins of the earthquake. It was discovered that the quake might have been caused by reservoir-induced seismicity, i.e. the weight of the water from Lake Oroville, whose dam had been completed in 1968, was pressing down on the fault zone enough to cause geologic stress, during which the fault might slip and cause an earthquake. As the concrete thin-arch design of the Auburn Dam could be vulnerable to such a quake, the project had to be drastically redesigned.

Over the next few years, while all construction was stayed, Reclamation conducted evaluations of the seismic potential of the dam site, even though these delays caused the cost of the project to rise with every passing year. The studies concluded that a major fault system underlay the vicinity of the Auburn Dam site, with many folds of metamorphic rock formed by the contact of the foothill rocks and the granite batholith of the Sierra Nevada. Reclamation predicted that the Auburn Reservoir could induce an earthquake of up to a 6.5, while the U.S. Geological Survey projected a higher magnitude of 7.0. Nevertheless, Reclamation redesigned the Auburn Dam based on their 6.5 figure, even though a 7.0 would be three times stronger. The design for the Auburn Dam was changed to a concrete thick-arch gravity dam, to provide better protection against a possible earthquake induced by its own reservoir.

Through the rest of the 1970s, other possible designs were looked at but never implemented, while preliminary work on the construction site resumed. On April 29, 1979, the foundations for the Auburn Dam were completed. However, debates continued over whether to build an arched or straight-axis gravity dam. Some favored the latter design because it would have greater mass, allowing it to better withstand earthquakes.

=== Cofferdam failure ===
In early February 1986 ten inches (twenty-five centimetres) of rain fell on the Sacramento region in 11 days, melting the Sierra Nevada snowpack and causing a huge flood to pour down the American River. The 1986 floods were some of the most severe recorded in the 20th century; Placer County was quickly designated a Federal Disaster Area. Rampaging streams and rivers incurred some $7.5 million in damages within the county. The rating for Sacramento's levees, supposedly designed to prevent a 125-year flood, was dropped to a 78-year flood in studies conducted after the 1986 event, which suggested that such weather occurred more frequently than previously believed. The floods tore out levees along the Sacramento and Feather Rivers through the Sacramento Valley, and the city of Sacramento was spared by a close margin. Folsom Lake filled to dangerously high levels with runoff from the North, Middle and South Forks of the American River.

The flood rapidly filled the pool behind the Auburn cofferdam to capacity, as the diversion tunnel could not handle all the water pouring into the reservoir. At about 6:00 A.M. on February 18, the rising water overtopped the cofferdam near the right abutment, creating a waterfall that quickly eroded into the structure. Although the cofferdam was designed with a soft earthen plug to fail in a controlled manner if any such event were to occur, the structure eroded quicker than expected. The outflow reached 100,000 cubic feet per second (2,800 m^{3}/s) by noon; several hours later the maximum discharge was reached at 250,000 cubic feet per second (7,100 m^{3}/s), completely inundating the construction site and destroying almost half of the cofferdam. When the 265-foot (81 m) high cofferdam collapsed, its backed-up water surged downstream into already-spilling Folsom Lake less than a mile downstream, deposited the dam debris and raised the lake level suddenly. Folsom Dam outflow reached 134,000 cubic feet per second (3,800 m^{3}/s), which exceeded the design capacity of levees through Sacramento, but the levees were not overtopped and severe flooding in the city was averted by a close margin. The flood events made it clear that the American River flood control system was inadequate for the flood potential of the watershed. This spurred renewed interest in the Auburn Dam, since a permanent dam would have helped store extra floodwater and also prevented the failure of the cofferdam.

== Stopping the project ==
=== Economic cost ===
Following the floods of the 1980s, public opinion began to turn against the Auburn Dam because of the massive estimated cost to finish the project, which was then already rising into the billions of dollars, and the fairly small amount of water it would capture relative to that cost. The best dam sites require a relatively small dam that can store massive amounts of water, and most of those sites in the U.S. have already been utilized. A comparison with Hoover Dam, for example, reveals that the Auburn would store very little water compared to its structural size. Lake Mead, the reservoir behind Hoover, stores about 28,500,000 acre-feet (35,200 GL). The proposed Auburn Reservoir, with a mere 8% of that capacity, would require the construction of a dam as tall as Hoover and over three times as wide.

As early as 1980, the cost of building the Auburn Dam was estimated at $1 billion. As of 2007, the cost to build the dam would be about $10 billion. Other projects to improve safety margins and spillway capacity of Folsom Dam, and to increase the capacity of levees in the Sacramento area, were projected to cost significantly less while also providing similar levels of flood protection. Also, the United States National Research Council believes that existing stream-flow records, which only date back about 150 years, are insuffient to justify the construction of a dam as large as Auburn. The amount of water supply that Auburn Dam would make available was also in question, because while the American River floods in some years, in other years it barely discharges enough water to fill existing reservoirs. This cast doubts that Auburn could deliver enough water to justify its cost, or the completion of Folsom South Canal, the other major feature of the Auburn-Folsom South Unit Project.

=== Failure risk ===
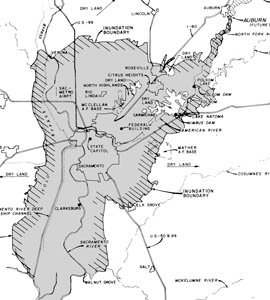
Map of the area around the confluence of the Sacramento and American Rivers that would be inundated if Auburn Dam were to fail

The Auburn Dam would also be at risk for failure from an earthquake, due to the risk of the reservoir inducing a quake on one of the many fault lines that crosses the area, known as the Bear Mountain fault zone. Surface displacement of the ground might range from a few inches/centimeters to 3 feet (0.91 m) in each direction, depending on the magnitude of the earthquake. Although a new concrete-gravity design by Reclamation was modeled to survive a magnitude 6.5 earthquake, it performed poorly under the 7.0 that the USGS had originally estimated.

A Bureau of Reclamation study released in 1980 projected that a failure of Auburn Dam would result in a giant wave reaching Folsom Lake within five minutes; depending on reservoir levels, it would cause a cascading failure of Folsom and Nimbus Dams downstream within an hour, unleashing millions of acre-feet of water which would cause far greater damage downstream than any natural flood. Most of the greater Sacramento area would be inundated; Nimbus Dam would be overtopped by 70 feet (21 m) of water and the California State Capitol would be under 40 feet (12 m) of water. An earlier study in 1975 predicted that a failure of Folsom Dam alone would result in over 250,000 deaths. If Auburn were to fail at full capacity, the resulting flood would be over three times larger, and cause even greater damage, inundating land for miles on either side of the American and Sacramento rivers.

=== Impact on recreation ===
Filling the Auburn Reservoir would have resulted in a two-pronged, 40-mile (64 km) lake which would have inundated numerous canyons and rapids of the North and Middle Forks of the American River. In 1981, the American River was acknowledged as the most popular recreational river in California. Over one million people visit the canyons of the North and Middle Forks of the American River each year to engage in various recreational activities, including kayaking, rafting, hiking, hunting, biking, horseback riding, gold mining, off-roading, and rock climbing. Approximately 900,000 of these visitors go to the Auburn State Recreation Area, which includes the former dam site. The reservoir would have inundated most of the Auburn recreation area, although some new recreational opportunities such as boating, water-skiing and deep water fishing would have been created as a result of the new lake. Many trails, including those used by the Tevis Cup and Western States Endurance Run, would have been submerged. The Auburn Reservoir would also have resulted in the destruction of thousands of acres of riverine habitat, and the inundation of historic and archaeological sites.

=== Fate of the project ===
In the end, the Auburn Dam project, once referred to as "the dam that wouldn't die" and "with more lives than an alley cat", was defeated by the intervention of environmentalists, conservationists, and cost-conscious economists. Although four bills to revive the dam project were introduced in Congress over the next twenty years, all were turned down. Representative Norman D. Shumway introduced the Auburn Dam Revival Act of 1987, which was rejected because of the phenomenally high costs. A flood control bill in 1988 involving the Auburn Dam was also defeated. In 1992 and 1996, plans for restarting the Auburn project appeared in various water projects bills. However, even though the project was now leaning towards purely flood control instead of the original expensive multipurpose that environmental groups had opposed, both were denied. As the years dragged on, the cost of the project grew, and it officially ended with the revoking of USBR water rights to the site by the state on November 11, 2008.

== Proposals for resurrecting the Auburn Dam ==
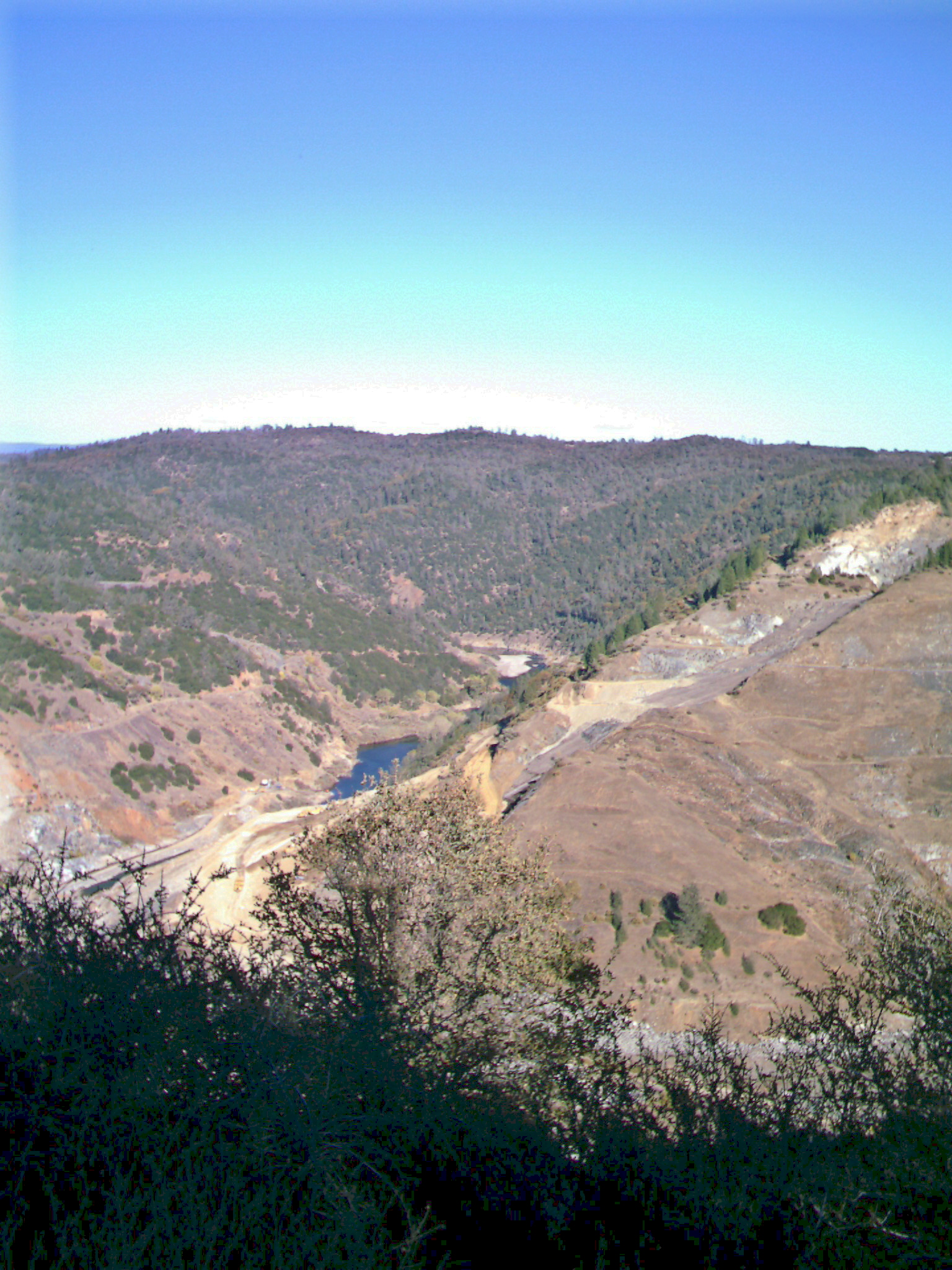
The proposed site of the Auburn Dam; the original concrete dam footing is visible to the right of the river

Auburn Dam is the public works equivalent of a Hollywood zombie, rivaling any Tinseltown creation in its ability to withstand repeated attempts to kill it. First proposed nearly a half-century ago for a site in the American River canyon near the Gold Rush town of Auburn, the dam has withstood attacks by U.S. presidents, member of Congress, state and federal agencies, environmentalists, tax watchdogs, scientists, engineers and even nature itself—the political equivalent of being shot, stabbed, drowned, poisoned, electrocuted and set on fire. —Renewed Flood Sensitivity Reactivates Auburn Dam – California Planning and Development Report, August 8, 2006

Although the Auburn Dam is now mostly considered history, there are still proponents and groups devoted to restarting the long-inactive project. Advocates argue that the construction of Auburn would be the only solution for providing much-needed flood protection to the Sacramento area; that millions of dollars have already been spent making preparations; that it would provide an abundant supply of reliable water and hydroelectricity; and also that the recreational areas lost under the reservoir could be rebuilt around it. A major supporter of the revival of the dam was the Sacramento County Taxpayer's League which reported in 2011 that two-thirds of Sacramento citizens support construction of the Auburn. The League also argued that the dam would only cost $2.6 billion instead of $6–10 billion, and that it is the cheapest alternative to provide flood control for the American River.

Area Congressman John Doolittle was one of the most vocal proponents of the Auburn Dam, and he is sometimes known as the Auburn Dam's "chief sponsor". Doolittle appropriated several million dollars for funds to conduct feasibility studies for the dam. Approximately $3 million went into the main feasibility report, and the remaining $1 million was used for a study concerning the relocation of California State Route 49, which runs through the site. After Hurricane Katrina in 2005, Doolittle drew public attention to the flood vulnerability of the Sacramento region. He also used the flood-protection "incompetence" of the Folsom Dam to his advantage, saying that "without an Auburn Dam we could soon be in the unenviable position of suffering from both severe drought and severe flooding in the very same year." He led all 18 Republican members of the United States House of Representatives from California in a protest in 2008, trying to convince Governor Arnold Schwarzenegger to revoke the water-rights decision that California had made against Reclamation.

In response to public outcry, most pro-Auburn Dam groups recommended the construction of a dry dam, or one that purely supports the purpose of flood control. Such a dam would stand empty most of the year, but during a flood the excess flow would pool temporarily behind the dam instead of flowing straight through, and therefore the dam could still provide flood control while leaving the American River canyons dry for most of the year. Water would be impounded for only a few days or weeks each year instead of all year long, minimizing damage on the local environment. The dam would be built to protect against a 500-year flood. Also, with the construction of a "dry" Auburn Dam, Folsom Lake could be kept at a higher level throughout the year because of reduced flood-control pressure, therefore facilitating recreational access to the reservoir. Finally, regulations in flow could help groundwater recharge efforts; the lower Sacramento Valley aquifer is acknowledged as severely depleted.

== Legacy ==
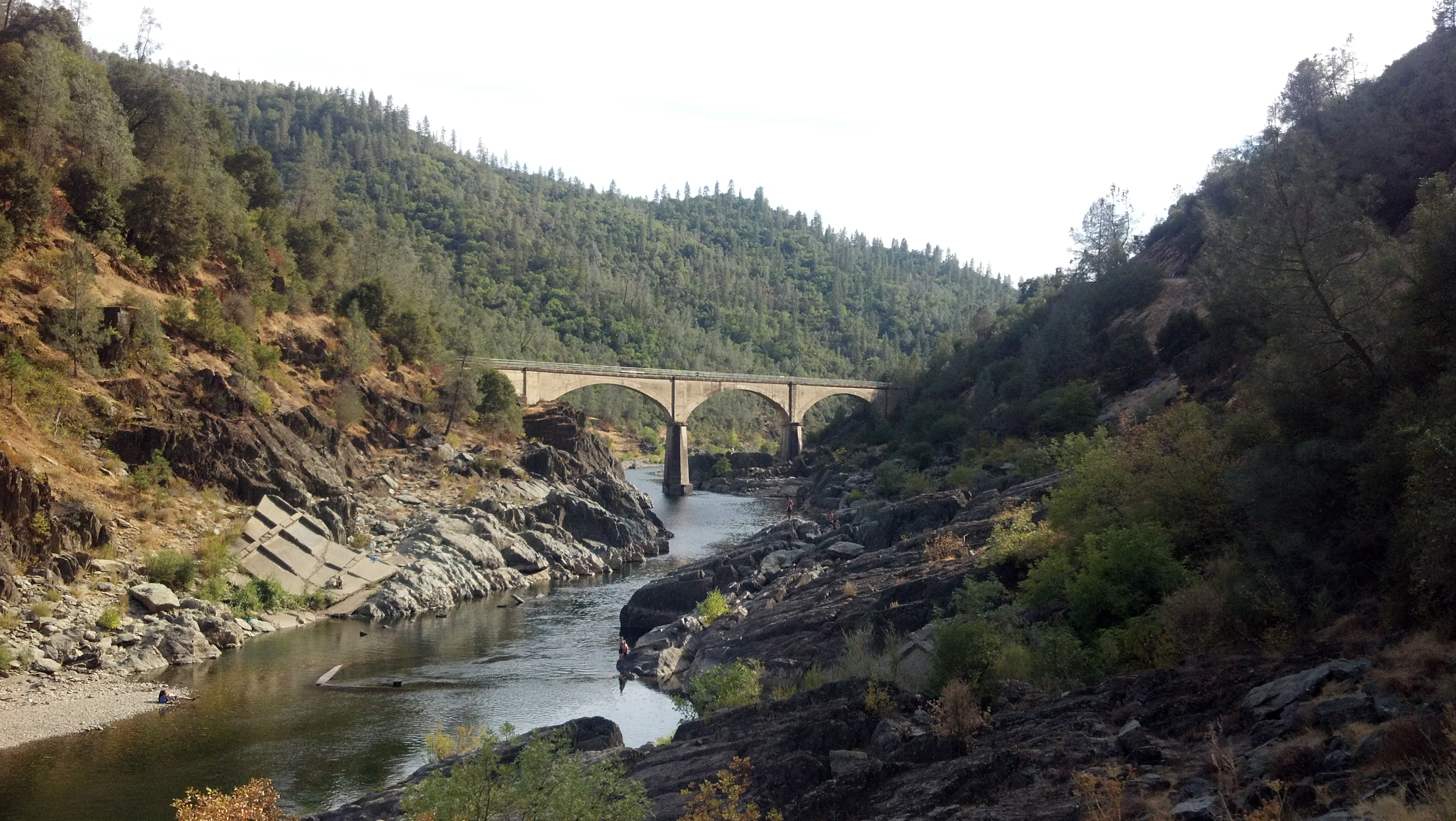
Part of the North Fork American River valley, which would have been submerged if the Auburn Dam had been constructed

Since its inception, hundreds of millions of dollars were poured into the Auburn Dam project, but no further work was done since the 1980s. However, the Bureau of Reclamation continued to list the Auburn as a considered alternative for the future of its Auburn-Folsom South Unit project. Massive evidence of the dam's construction remains in the North Fork American River canyon, specifically the excavations for the abutments and spillway, with the consequences of increased erosion.

In recent decades, California was struck with a series of severe droughts. In order to facilitate continued deliveries of water to the southern half of the state, the Central Valley and State Water Projects have cut water supplies for agriculture in much of the San Joaquin Valley. Annual deficits of water in the state were projected to rise from 1,600,000 acre-feet (2,000,000 dam^{3}) in 1998 to an estimated 2,900,000 acre-feet (3,600,000 dam^{3}) by 2025. The state proposed four solutions to the shortfall:

- The Peripheral Canal that would facilitate water flow from the water-rich north to the dry south, but has never been built due to environmental concerns.
- The raising of either the Shasta Dam on the Sacramento or the New Melones Dam on the Stanislaus
- The building of the Sites Reservoir.
- The revival of the Auburn Dam.

According to supporters, the Auburn Dam would cause the least environmental destruction of the multitude of choices, and would give the most reliable water yield, regardless of its skyrocketing costs.

In part as an alternative to the Auburn Dam project, flood control for the lower American River was improved through the US$1 billion Joint Federal Project (a collaboration of the US Bureau of Reclamation and the US Army Corps of Engineers) at Folsom Dam which added a new lower spillway and strengthened the eight dikes that serve as part of the dam. Additional work proposed included a possible raise of Folsom Dam several feet to improve its flood control and storage capacity. Key levees downstream were also improved for flood control in the Sacramento area by the US Army Corps of Engineers and the Sacramento Area Flood Control Agency. Sugar Pine Reservoir, an auxiliary component of the Auburn-Folsom South Project upstream in the watershed, was transferred in title by the Bureau of Reclamation to Foresthill Public Utility District in 2003. As a result of a court decision in 1990 (Hodge Decision), the uses of Reclamation's Folsom South Canal changed further when the Freeport Project came online in 2011 to redivert water supplies for East Bay Municipal Utility District and Sacramento County Water Agency from the Sacramento River instead of from the canal via the lower American River, thereby reducing the need for additional supplies from Auburn Dam to the American River. Anticipated diversions from the Folsom South Canal had previously been reduced when the Sacramento Municipal Utility District decommissioned its Rancho Seco nuclear facility in 1989 and no longer required large quantities of cooling water from the canal.

A pumping station to supply water to the Placer County Water Agency was built in 2006 on the Middle Fork American River, supplying 100 cubic feet per second (2.8 m^{3}/s) to a northwest-running pipeline, eliminating the need for Auburn Dam for this supply. The capacity of the station is eventually expected to be upgraded to 225 cubic feet per second (6.4 m^{3}/s). By 2006, the Bureau of Reclamation itself began to restore the dam site, which then had been untouched for more than a decade. The river diversion tunnel was sealed but not filled in, and the remnants of the construction site in the riverbed as well as the remains of the cofferdam excavated from the canyon. After the riverbed was leveled and graded, an artificial riverbed with manmade Class III rapids was constructed to channel the river through the site. The restoration project also included the construction of other recreational amenities in the Auburn site. This act was seen as the final step of decommissioning the Auburn project and shelving it forever.

== Works cited ==
- Smith, Jordan Fisher (2006). Nature Noir: A Park Ranger's Patrol in the Sierra. Houghton Mifflin Harcourt. ISBN 0-618-71195-3.
- "American River Watershed Common Features General Reevaluation Report. Final Environmental Impact Statement/Environmental Impact Report" (PDF). U.S. Army Corps of Engineers. December 2015.
