= Foresthill, California =

- census-designated place
- Location in Placer County and the state of California

- Location in the United States
- Coordinates: 39°00′19″N 120°49′53″W
- Country: United States
- State: California
- County: Placer

Government
  - State senator: Megan Dahle (R)
  - Assemblymember: Heather Hadwick (R)
  - U. S. rep.: Kevin Kiley (I)

Area
  - Total: 11.185 sq mi (28.969 km^{2})
  - Land: 11.185 sq mi (28.969 km^{2})
  - Water: 0 sq mi (0 km^{2}) 0%
- Elevation: 2,169 ft (661 m)

Population (2020)
  - Total: 1,692
  - Density: 151.3/sq mi (58.41/km^{2})
- Time zone: UTC-8 (PST)
  - Summer (DST): UTC-7 (PDT)
- ZIP code: 95631
- Area code: 530
- FIPS code: 06-24834
- GNIS feature ID: 2408229

California Historical Landmark
- Reference no.: 399

Foresthill is a census-designated place (CDP) in Placer County, California, United States. It is part of the Sacramento metropolitan area. The population was 1,692 at the 2020 census, up from 1,483 at the 2010 census.

== History ==
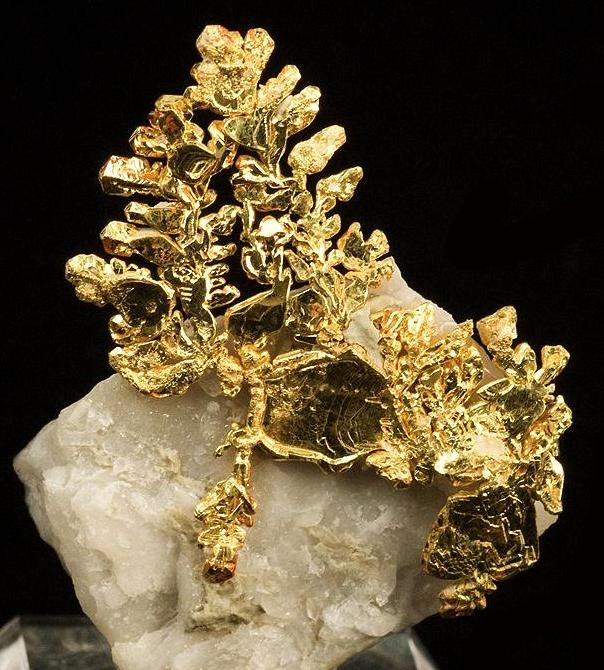
Gold specimen from the Eagles Nest mine, about 2 miles east of Foresthill. This is the premier mine for specimen gold in California, and this specimen appeared on the cover of a book and a major magazine. Among mineral collectors, it is widely known as the "Cover Gold". Size 5.5 x 4.5 x 2.5 cm.

Foresthill is located on a broad ridge between the North and Middle Forks of the American River on the gold-bearing gravel bed of an ancient river.

In the spring of 1850, miners came to the Forest Hill Divide in large numbers. There was one route from Auburn through Yankee Jim's and one from Coloma. At the junction of these trails, the Forest House hotel and trading post was built. The height of mining activity in Foresthill began in 1853 after a winter landslide at the head of Jenny Lind Canyon exposed numerous nuggets of gold. The Jenny Lind mine produced about $2,500 of gold a day for a while, up to a total output over $1 million by 1880. The combined production of all the mines in the Forest Hill area was estimated at $10 million by 1868 with gold selling for $16 an ounce.

In the 1860s, there were about 125,000 feet (38,000 m) of hard-rock tunnels dug into the hillsides in, around and under Foresthill. By 1857, this area had become an important center for trade among the many gold camps on the divide. In 1862, the Hardy-Kennedy building was erected - the first fireproof store in Foresthill. This building, now known as the Langstaff building, is still being used by the merchants of Foresthill.

By 1880, Foresthill was one of the largest towns in Placer County, with an 80-foot (24 m) wide main street. Today the town has a marker identifying it as a California Historical Landmark. The marker is located at 24540 Main Street.

== Geography ==
According to the United States Census Bureau Foresthill has a total area of 11.2 square miles (29 km^{2}), all of it land.

=== Climate ===
Foresthill has a hot-summer Mediterranean climate that is characterized by cool, wet winters and hot, dry summers (Köppen climate classification Csa).

Climate data for Foresthill, California
Month	Jan	Feb	Mar	Apr	May	Jun	Jul	Aug	Sep	Oct	Nov	Dec	Year
Mean daily maximum °F (°C)	51.9 (11.1)	53.8 (12.1)	58.2 (14.6)	63.2 (17.3)	71.8 (22.1)	80.9 (27.2)	89.0 (31.7)	89.0 (31.7)	82.2 (27.9)	70.6 (21.4)	57.7 (14.3)	51.6 (10.9)	68.3 (20.2)
Daily mean °F (°C)	43.1 (6.2)	44.3 (6.8)	47.4 (8.6)	51.3 (10.7)	59.8 (15.4)	67.8 (19.9)	75.3 (24.1)	75.3 (24.1)	70.1 (21.2)	60.1 (15.6)	49.5 (9.7)	42.4 (5.8)	57.2 (14.0)
Mean daily minimum °F (°C)	34.2 (1.2)	34.7 (1.5)	36.6 (2.6)	39.5 (4.2)	47.7 (8.7)	54.8 (12.7)	61.6 (16.4)	61.5 (16.4)	57.9 (14.4)	49.6 (9.8)	41.2 (5.1)	33.1 (0.6)	46.0 (7.8)
Average precipitation inches (mm)	10.01 (254)	7.73 (196)	7.25 (184)	4.04 (103)	2.26 (57)	0.63 (16)	0.08 (2.0)	0.20 (5.1)	0.74 (19)	2.95 (75)	6.77 (172)	9.04 (230)	51.69 (1,313)
Average snowfall inches (cm)	8.0 (20)	6.4 (16)	5.3 (13)	2.0 (5.1)	0.1 (0.25)	0 (0)	0 (0)	0 (0)	0 (0)	0 (0)	0.7 (1.8)	3.2 (8.1)	25.7 (65)
Average precipitation days	10	10	10	7	5	2	0	1	2	5	8	9	69
Source 1: PRISM Climate Group
Source 2: Western Regional Climate Center

=== Points of Interest ===
Foresthill Bridge

== Demographics ==
Historical population
Census	Pop.	Note	%±
1980	1,304		—
1990	1,409		8.1%
2000	1,791		27.1%
2010	1,483		−17.2%
2020	1,692		14.1%
U.S. Decennial Census 1980; 1990 2000 2010

Foresthill first appeared as a census designated place in the 1980 United States census.

=== 2020 census ===
As of the 2020 census, Foresthill had a population of 1,692. The population density was 151.3 inhabitants per square mile (58.4/km^{2}). The median age was 39.8 years. For every 100 females, there were 108.1 males, and for every 100 females age 18 and over, there were 113.5 males age 18 and over.

The whole population lived in households. There were 673 households, of which 153 (22.7%) had children under the age of 18 living in them. Of all households, 338 (50.2%) were married-couple households, 26 (3.9%) were cohabiting couple households, 202 (30.0%) had a male householder with no spouse or partner present, and 107 (15.9%) had a female householder with no spouse or partner present. About 199 households (29.6%) were made up of individuals, and 80 (11.8%) had someone living alone who was 65 years of age or older. The average household size was 2.51, and 429 families were counted (63.7% of all households).

The age distribution was 368 people (21.7%) under the age of 18, 115 people (6.8%) aged 18 to 24, 451 people (26.7%) aged 25 to 44, 447 people (26.4%) aged 45 to 64, and 311 people (18.4%) who were 65 years of age or older.

There were 756 housing units at an average density of 67.6 units per square mile (26.1 units/km^{2}). Of these, 673 (89.0%) were occupied and 83 (11.0%) were vacant. Among occupied units, 502 (74.6%) were owner-occupied and 171 (25.4%) were renter-occupied. The homeowner vacancy rate was 2.3%, and the rental vacancy rate was 9.0%. 0.0% of residents lived in urban areas, while 100.0% lived in rural areas.

Racial composition as of the 2020 census
Race	Number	Percent
White	1,367	80.8%
Black or African American	7	0.4%
American Indian and Alaska Native	41	2.4%
Asian	10	0.6%
Native Hawaiian and Other Pacific Islander	1	0.1%
Some other race	26	1.5%
Two or more races	240	14.2%
Hispanic or Latino (of any race)	161	9.5%
