= North Fork American River =

Tributary of the American River in Northern California

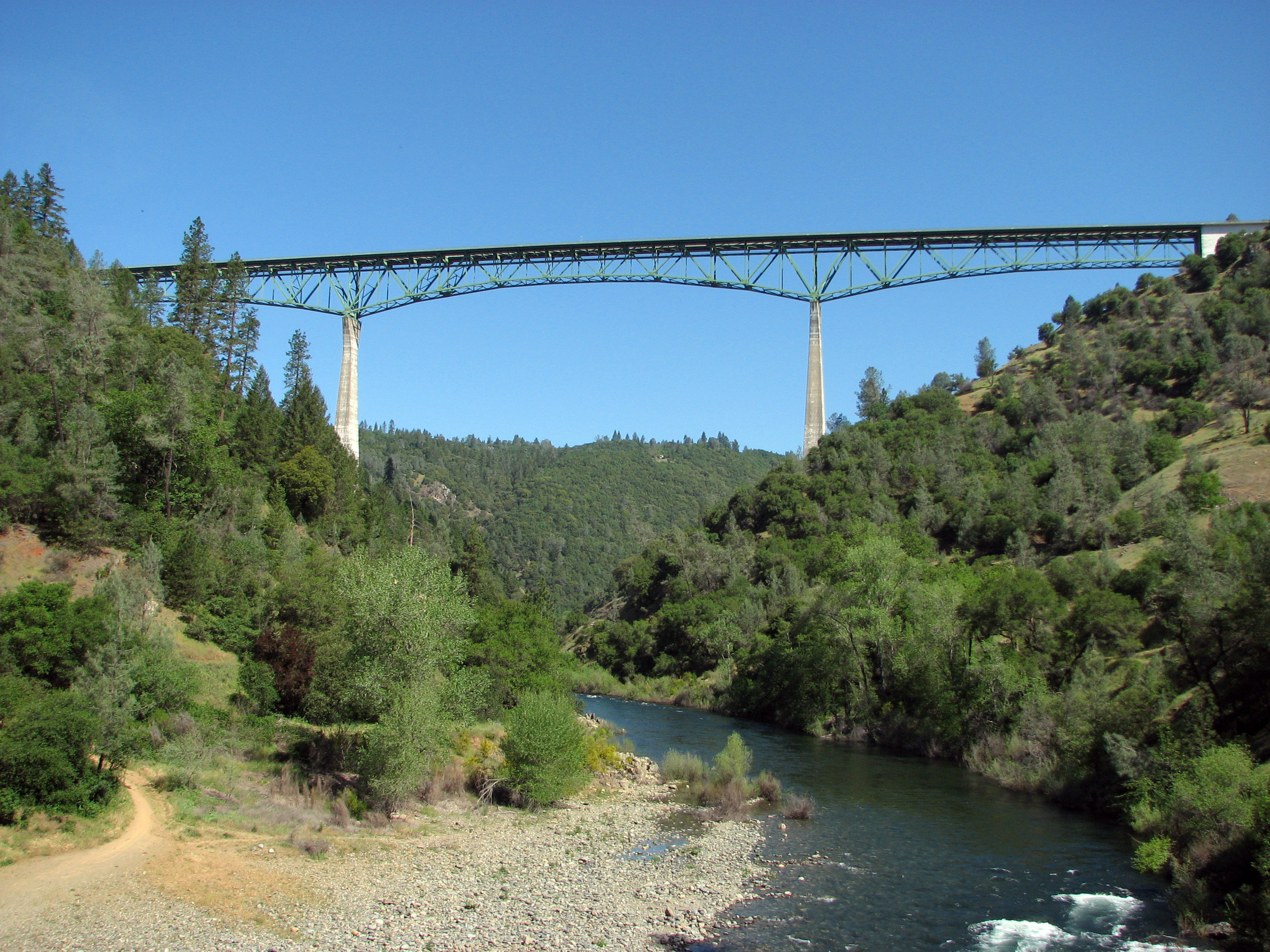
- Foresthill Bridge over the North Fork

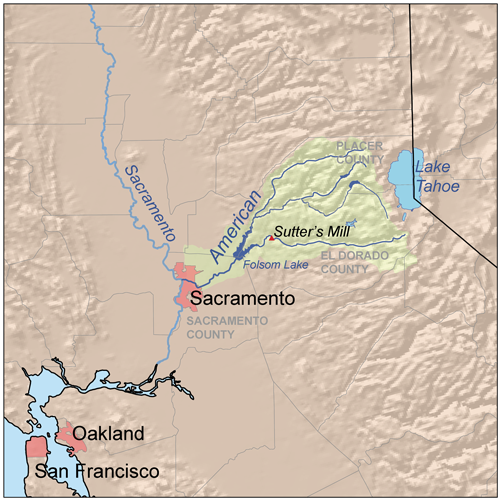
- Map of the American River watershed including the North Fork

Location
- Country: United States
- State: California

Physical characteristics
- Source: Mountain Meadow Lake
  - location: Sierra Nevada, Placer County
  - coordinates: 39°13′04″N 120°16′28″W
  - elevation: 7,935 ft (2,419 m)
- Mouth: Folsom Lake
  - location: Auburn, Placer County
  - coordinates: 38°42′42″N 121°08′44″W
  - elevation: 469 ft (143 m)
- Length: 88 mi (142 km)
- Basin size: 996 sq mi (2,580 km^{2})
- Discharge
  - location: Rattlesnake Bar
  - average: 2,289 cu ft/s (64.8 m^{3}/s)
  - minimum: 51 cu ft/s (1.4 m^{3}/s)
  - maximum: 115,000 cu ft/s (3,300 m^{3}/s)

The North Fork American River is the longest branch of the American River in Northern California. It is 88 miles (142 km) long from its source at the crest of the Sierra Nevada, near Lake Tahoe, to its mouth at Folsom Lake northeast of Sacramento. Prior to the construction of Folsom Dam the river was about 9 miles (14 km) longer making for a total length of 97 miles (156 km).

It rises at Mountain Meadow Lake near the 9,008 ft (2,746 m) peak of Granite Chief in the Tahoe National Forest. Flowing initially northwest, the river soon swings west into a gorge, paralleling the Forest Hill Divide on the south. Big Granite Creek then joins the North Fork of the American River coming in from the right. The canyon shallows as the river turns southwest, carving through the Sierra foothills, then turning abruptly south near Colfax. About 4 miles (6.4 km) downstream, it receives Shirttail Creek from the left then is impounded in Lake Clementine (or North Fork Lake) which is formed by the North Fork Dam, built in 1939 to contain hydraulic mining debris.

Below the dam, the river bends south, passing under the Foresthill Bridge, the highest bridge in California, then receives the Middle Fork American River, its largest tributary, from the left. The valley widens as the river flows south past Auburn, soon emptying into the north arm of Folsom Lake, a reservoir formed in 1955 by the Folsom Dam. Its waters merge in the lake with those of the South Fork American River and form the American River, a tributary of the Sacramento River.

== See also ==
- American River topics
- Auburn Dam
- California Gold Rush
- Mountain Quarries Bridge — on the North Fork.
