= Cardwell v. American Bridge Co. =

- Supreme Court of the United States

Argued January 6, 1885 Decided January 19, 1885
- Full case name: Cardwell v. American Bridge Co.
- Citations: 113 U.S. 205 (more) 5 S. Ct. 423; 28 L. Ed. 959

Case history
- Prior: 19 F. 562 (C.C.D.Cal. 1884)

Holding
- Absent congressional legislation, a state has plenary power to obstruct the flow of a navigable river within its territory.

Court membership
- Chief Justice Morrison Waite Associate Justices Samuel F. Miller · Stephen J. Field; Joseph P. Bradley · John M. Harlan; William B. Woods · Stanley Matthews; Horace Gray · Samuel Blatchford

Case opinion
- Majority: Field, joined by unanimous

Cardwell v. American Bridge Co., 113 U.S. 205 (1885), was a United States Supreme Court case in which the court held that, absent congressional legislation, a state has plenary power to obstruct the flow of a navigable river within its territory. The case was about a bridge erected by American Bridge Company over the American River in northern California, downriver from Cardwell's property on that navigable section of the river. Cardwell wanted the bridge removed. The Supreme Court's decision left the bridge in place.

== Background ==
The defendant was a corporation organized under the laws of California, and pursuant to the authority conferred by an act of its legislature, has constructed a bridge over the American River, of 20 feet (6.1 m) wide and 300 feet (91 m) long, and was used as a roadway across the river. Its floor is about 14 feet (4.3 m) above lowest water and about 5 feet (1.5 m) above highest water, was without a draw or opening for the passage of vessels. Steamboats and other craft were therefore obstructed by it in the navigation of the river.

The complainant alleged that he was the owner of a large tract of land, bordering on the river below Folsom, and raises many tons of grain each year; that he was also the owner of a steamboat and other vessels by which he could ship his grain down the river but for the obstruction caused by the bridge; that there are also large quarries of granite on his land sufficient to supply the markets of Sacramento and San Francisco for years, and also large deposits of cobblestone which have a value for paving, and, but for the obstruction, he could ship the granite and cobblestone by his vessels and sell them at a profit, whereas the expense of sending them by rail or other means open to him are such as to deprive him of all profit on them. He therefore files his bill against the company and prays that it may be enjoined from maintaining the bridge across the river until a draw shall have been placed in it sufficient to allow steamboats, vessels, and watercraft capable of navigating the stream to pass and repass freely and safely.

A demurrer to the bill was sustained and the bill dismissed.

== Supreme Court ==
The case reached the Supreme Court on a bill in equity. The Supreme Court upheld the dismissal.

The doctrine that, in the absence of legislation by Congress, a state may authorize a navigable stream within its limits to be obstructed by a bridge or highway reasserted, and the former cases to that effect referred to. The provision in the act admitting California

That all the navigable waters within the said state shall be common highways and forever free, as well to the inhabitants of said state as to the citizens of the United States, without any tax, impost, or duty therefor

does not deprive the state of the power possessed by other states, in the absence of legislation by Congress, to authorize the erection of bridges over navigable waters within the state. That provision aims to prevent the use of the navigable streams by private parties to the exclusion of the public and the exaction of tolls for their navigation.

The American River is a tributary of the Sacramento River in California. It is entirely within the state, and navigable for small steamboats and barges from its mouth on the Sacramento River to the town of Folsom, a distance of 30 miles (48 km). From its confluence with the Sacramento River, vessels starting upon it can proceed to San Francisco Bay and the Pacific Ocean, and thence to adjoining states and foreign countries. It is therefore a navigable water of the United States and, as such, is under the control of the general government in the exercise of its power to regulate foreign and interstate commerce so far as may be necessary to insure its free navigation.

== Later developments ==
Judge Lorenzo Sawyer said of this case that "...we are rapidly lapsing into states' rights again."
