= California Wild and Scenic Rivers Act =

Inspired by the National Wild and Scenic Rivers Act the California Wild and Scenic Rivers Act was passed in 1972. The California Wild and Scenic Rivers Act serves a similar purpose to the National Wild and Scenic Rivers Act. Its goal is to protect and preserve certain sections of river in the state of California.

== History ==
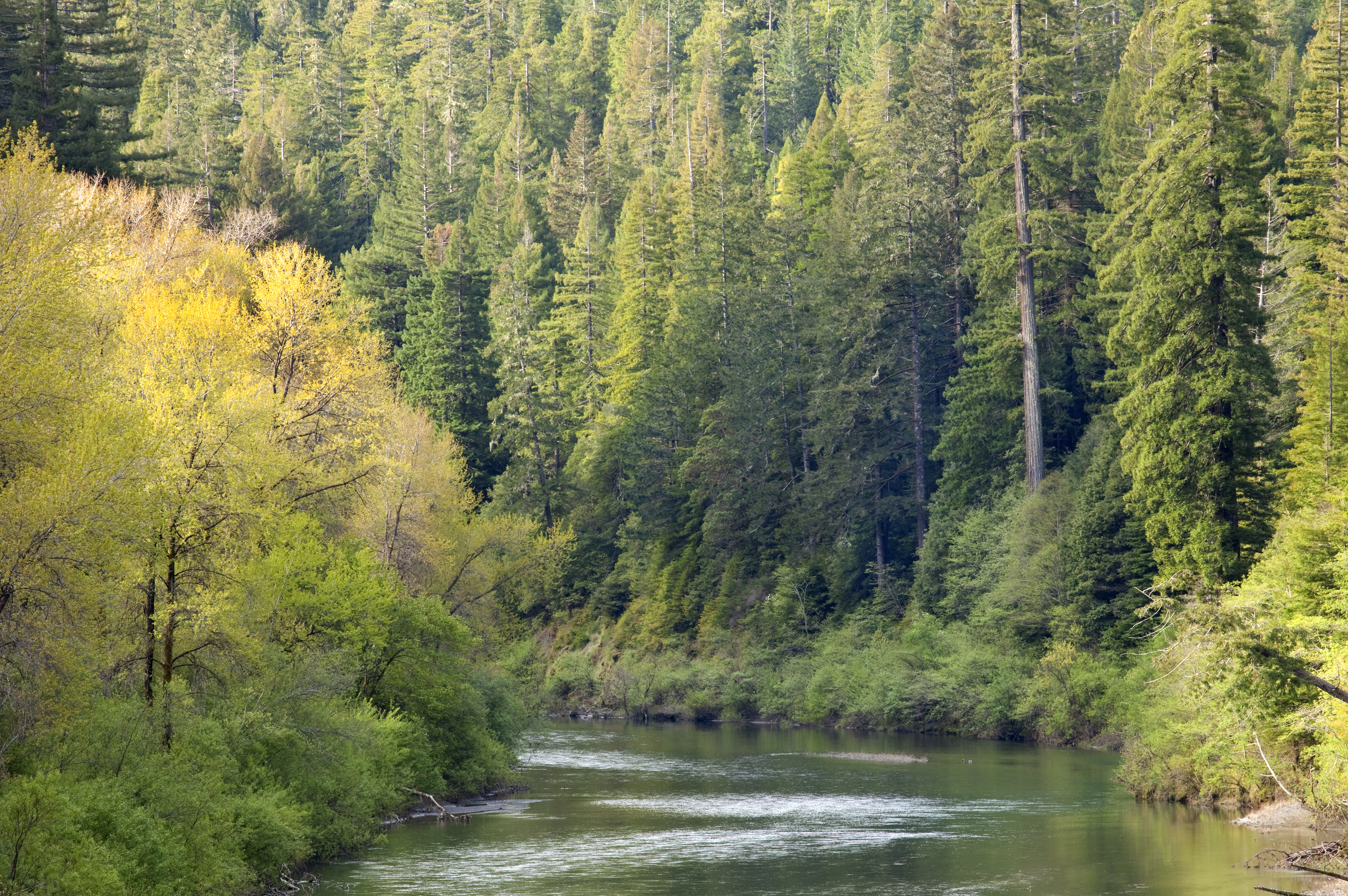
The Eel River was designated Wild and Scenic in the State Wild and Scenic System in 1972

Signed into law in 1972, the California Wild and Scenic Rivers act compliments the National Wild and Scenic Rivers Act. This law is independent and operates differently from the National Wild and Scenic Rivers Act. The California Wild and Scenic Rivers act preserves and protects sections of river that have been designated. A Wild and Scenic designation under the State system prohibits the construction of a dam, water conduit, reservoir, powerhouse, transmission line, or other projects. The State System does not require the creation of a management plan unlike the National Wild and Scenic Rivers Act, though one can be created. A few rivers within the State system have management plans. Under the California Wild and Scenic Rivers Act there are various types of designations. "Rivers or segments included with the system are classified by the Legislature as “wild,” “scenic,” or “recreational” based on the level of existing development of adjacent land areas when designated (§ 5093.53)."

== Purpose and terms ==
"It is the policy of the State of California that certain rivers which possess extraordinary scenic, recreational, fishery, or wildlife values shall be preserved in their free-flowing state, together with their immediate environments, for the benefit and enjoyment of the people of the state. The Legislature declares that such use of these rivers is the highest and most beneficial use and is a reasonable and beneficial use of water within the meaning of Section 2 of Article X of the California Constitution. It is the purpose of this chapter to create a California Wild and Scenic Rivers System to be administered in accordance with the provisions of this chapter."

=== Definitions ===
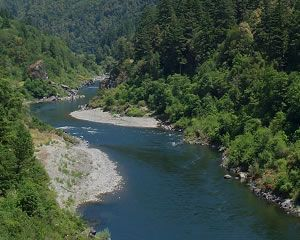
The Trinity River, which is designated as a wild and scenic river under both the National and State Wild and Scenic Systems.

- "River" means the water, bed, and shoreline of rivers, streams, channels, lakes, bays, estuaries, marshes, wetlands, and lagoons, up to the first line of permanently established riparian vegetation.
- "Free-flowing" means existing or flowing without artificial impoundment, diversion, or other modification of the river. The presence of low dams, diversion works, and other minor structures does not automatically bar a river's inclusion within the system. However, this subdivision does not authorize or encourage future construction of those structures on any component of the system.
- "System" means the California Wild and Scenic Rivers System.
- "Immediate environments" means the land immediately adjacent to the segments of the rivers designated in Section 5093.54
- "Special treatment areas" means, for purposes of this chapter, those areas defined as special treatment areas in Section 895.1 of Title 14 of the California * * * Code of Regulations, as in effect on January 1, 2004, as that definition applies to wild and scenic river segments designated from time to time in Section 5093.54, and also includes areas within 200 feet of the watercourse transition line of a state-designated recreational river segment designated in Section 5093.54 that may be at risk during timber operations.

Under the State Wild and Scenic Act, the Secretary of Natural Resource Agency is the only path to designation. They may study a river and make a recommendation to the State Assembly or Senate. If it passes both houses of the legislature, it is sent to the Governor for approval.

== California State Wild and Scenic Rivers ==
This is the list of California State Wild and Scenic Rivers as of 2020.

| Name | Wild | Scenic | Recreational | Other | Total | Year of designation |
|---|---|---|---|---|---|---|
| Albion River | 0 | 0 | 3.9 | 0 | 3.9 | 2003 |
| American River (Lower) | 0 | 0 | 23 | 0 | 23 | 1972 |
| American River (North Fork) | 44 | 3.1 | 0 | 0 | 47.1 | 1972 |
| Cache Creek | 21 | 4.7 | 5.7 | 0 | 31.4 | 2005 |
| Carson River (East Fork) | 0 | 10.7 | 0 | 0 | 10.7 | 1989 |
| Eel River | 87.72 | 14.87 | 241.2 | 0 | 343.79 | 1972 |
| North Fork Eel | 30.74 | 0 | 3.11 | 0 | 33.85 | 1972 |
| Middle Fork Eel | 35.3 | 8.6 | 5.23 | 0 | 49.13 | 1972 |
| Main Eel | 13.3 | 6.27 | 138.16 | 0 | 157.73 | 1972 |
| South Fork Eel | 8.38 | 0 | 94.7 | 0 | 103.08 | 1972 |
| Gualala River | 0 | 0 | 3.39 | 0 | 3.39 | 2003 |
| Klamath River | 0 | 0 | 257 | 0 | 257 | 1972 |
| Mokelumne River | 18.41 | 3 | 15.55 | 0 | 36.96 | 2018 |
| Salmon River | 11.92 | 14.38 | 47.15 | 0 | 73.45 | 1979 |
| North Fork Salmon | 4.51 | 0 | 23.7 | 0 | 28.21 | 1979 |
| Main Salmon | 0 | 8.21 | 11.57 | 0 | 19.78 | 1979 |
| South Fork Salmon | 0 | 6.17 | 11.88 | 0 | 18.05 | 1979 |
| Wooley Creek | 7.41 | 0 | 0 | 0 | 7.41 | 1979 |
| Scott River | 0 | 6.39 | 18.36 | 0 | 24.75 | 1972 |
| Smith River | 53.1 | 2.24 | 243.62 | 0 | 298.96 | 1972 |
| North Fork Smith | 12.23 | 1.11 | 1.1 | 0 | 14.44 | 1972 |
| Main Smith | 0 | 0 | 25.9 | 0 | 25.9 | 1972 |
| Middle Fork Smith | 7.12 | 1.13 | 19.3 | 0 | 27.55 | 1972 |
| South Fork Smith | 23.3 | 0 | 17.9 | 0 | 41.2 | 1972 |
| Myrtle Creek | 0 | 0 | 6.73 | 0 | 6.73 | 1972 |
| Shelly Creek | 0 | 0 | 9.56 | 0 | 9.56 | 1972 |
| Kelly Creek | 0 | 0 | 3.86 | 0 | 3.86 | 1972 |
| Packsaddle Creek | 0 | 0 | 4.72 | 0 | 4.72 | 1972 |
| Patrick Creek | 0 | 0 | 3.38 | 0 | 3.38 | 1972 |
| East Fork Patrick Creek | 0 | 0 | 4.73 | 0 | 4.73 | 1972 |
| West Fork Patrick Creek | 0 | 0 | 3.06 | 0 | 3.06 | 1972 |
| Griffin Creek | 0 | 0 | 4.09 | 0 | 4.09 | 1972 |
| Knopki Creek | 0 | 0 | 5.69 | 0 | 5.69 | 1972 |
| Monkey Creek | 0 | 0 | 8.18 | 0 | 8.18 | 1972 |
| Diamond Creek | 0 | 0 | 9.27 | 0 | 9.27 | 1972 |
| North Fork Diamond Creek | 0 | 0 | 2.12 | 0 | 2.12 | 1972 |
| Bear Creek | 0 | 0 | 2.76 | 0 | 2.76 | 1972 |
| Still Creek | 0 | 0 | 3.11 | 0 | 3.11 | 1972 |
| High Plateau Creek | 0 | 0 | 3.13 | 0 | 3.13 | 1972 |
| Siskiyou Fork | 5.22 | 0 | 4.23 | 0 | 9.45 | 1972 |
| South Siskiyou Fork | 5.23 | 0 | 0 | 0 | 5.23 | 1972 |
| Williams Creek | 0 | 0 | 5.33 | 0 | 5.33 | 1972 |
| Eight mile Creek | 0 | 0 | 7.68 | 0 | 7.68 | 1972 |
| Prescott Fork | 0 | 0 | 7.59 | 0 | 7.59 | 1972 |
| Quartz Creek | 0 | 0 | 8.66 | 0 | 8.66 | 1972 |
| Jones Creek | 0 | 0 | 13.56 | 0 | 13.56 | 1972 |
| Hurdygurdy Creek | 0 | 0 | 16.3 | 0 | 16.3 | 1972 |
| Gordon Creek | 0 | 0 | 7.03 | 0 | 7.03 | 1972 |
| Coon Creek | 0 | 0 | 10.69 | 0 | 10.69 | 1972 |
| Craigs Creek | 0 | 0 | 10.2 | 0 | 10.2 | 1972 |
| Buck Creek | 0 | 0 | 7.47 | 0 | 7.47 | 1972 |
| Muzzleloader Creek | 0 | 0 | 3.28 | 0 | 3.28 | 1972 |
| Canthook Creek | 0 | 0 | 3.01 | 0 | 3.01 | 1972 |
| Trinity River | 44.66 | 40.59 | 121.02 | 0 | 206.27 | 1972 |
| North Fork Trinity | 13.6 | 0 | 1.65 | 0 | 15.25 | 1972 |
| Main Trinity | 0 | 12.9 | 99.8 | 0 | 112.7 | 1972 |
| South Fork Trinity | 23.94 | 22.46 | 10.7 | 0 | 57.1 | 1972 |
| New River | 7.12 | 5.23 | 8.87 | 0 | 21.22 | 1972 |
| Van Duzen River | 0 | 16.8 | 31.9 | 0 | 48.7 | 1972 |
| Walker River (West Fork) | 14 | 10 | 12.2 | 0 | 36.2 | 1989 |
| Yuba River (South Fork) | 0 | 32 | 8.1 | 0 | 40.1 | 1999 |
| McCloud | 0 | 0 | 0 | 46.7 | | 1989 |
| Deer Creek | 0 | 0 | 0 | N/A | | 1995 |
| West Fork Mill Creek | 0 | 0 | 0 | 8.07 | | 1995 |
| Mill Creek | 0 | 0 | 0 | 6.13 | | 1995 |
| East Fork Mill Creek | 0 | 0 | 0 | 6.46 | | 1995 |
| Totals: | 294.81 | 158.77 | 1032.09 | 67.36 | | |
