= American River =

River in California, United States

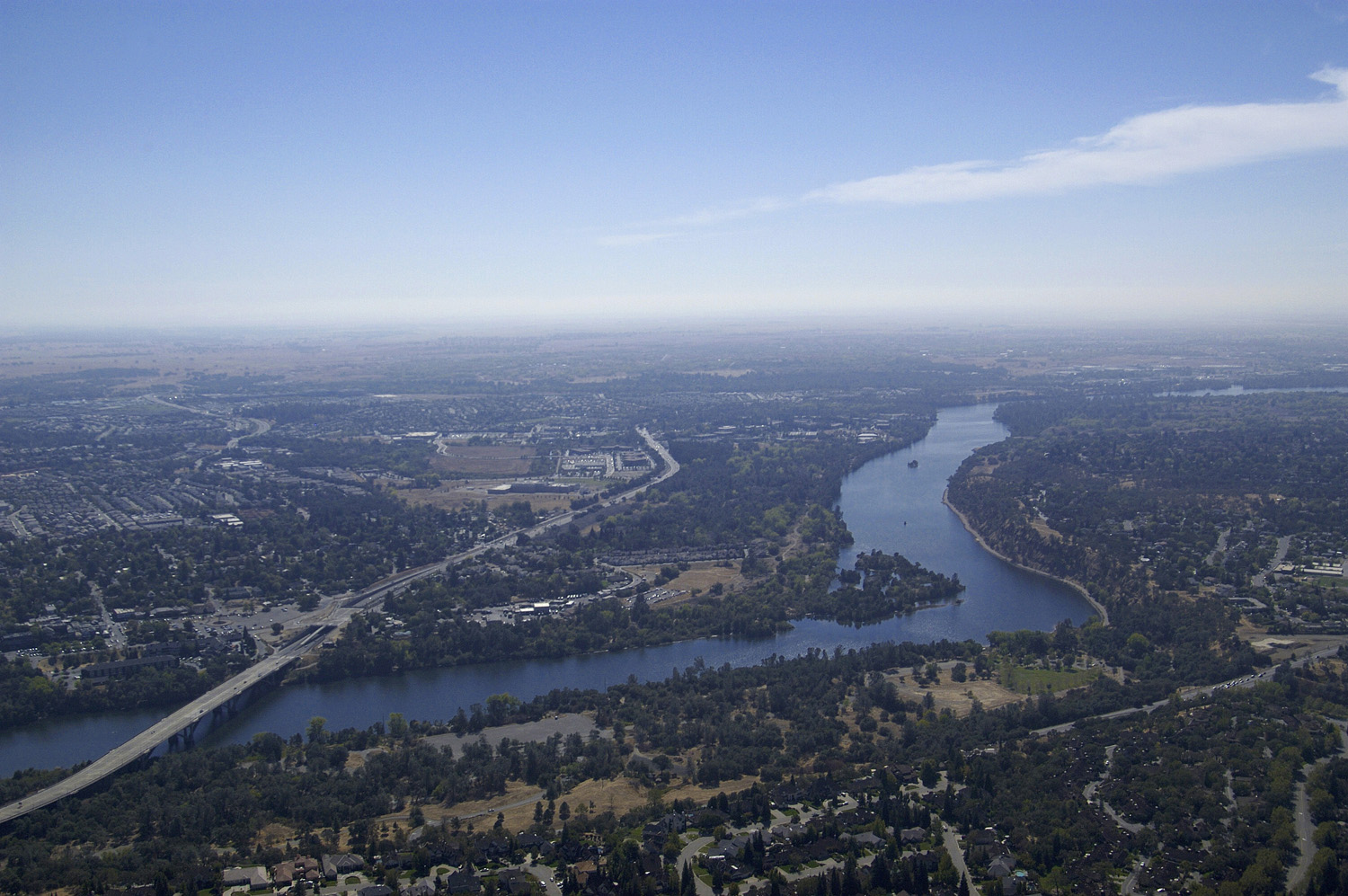
- The American River at Folsom

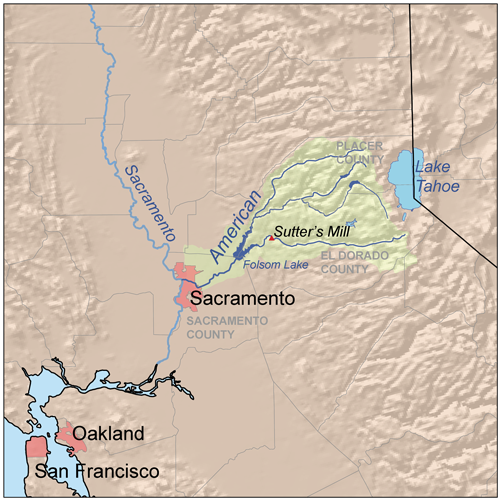
- Map of the American River watershed. It includes the North, Middle, and South forks of the river as well as Rubicon River, a tributary of the Middle Fork.

Location
- Country: United States
- State: California
- Region: Sacramento Valley
- City: Sacramento

Physical characteristics
- Source: North Fork American River
  - location: Mountain Meadow Lake, Placer County, CA
  - coordinates: 39°13′04″N 120°16′28″W
  - elevation: 7,923 ft (2,415 m)
- 2nd source: South Fork American River
  - location: Nebelhorn, El Dorado County
  - coordinates: 38°48′38″N 120°01′52″W
  - elevation: 7,401 ft (2,256 m)
- Source confluence: Folsom Lake
  - location: Near Folsom, California
  - coordinates: 38°29′28″N 121°09′24″W
  - elevation: 253 ft (77 m)
- Mouth: Sacramento River
  - location: Sacramento, CA
  - coordinates: 38°35′51″N 121°30′29″W
  - elevation: 10 ft (3.0 m)
- Length: 119 mi (192 km), Northeast-southwestMain stem 31 miles (50 km); North Fork 88 miles (142 km)
- Basin size: 2,150 sq mi (5,600 km^{2})
- Discharge
  - location: Fair Oaks
  - average: 3,685 cu ft/s (104.3 m^{3}/s)
  - minimum: 215 cu ft/s (6.1 m^{3}/s)
  - maximum: 314,000 cu ft/s (8,900 m^{3}/s)

Basin features
- River system: Sacramento River watershed
- Tributaries
  - left: South Fork American River
  - right: North Fork American River

National Wild and Scenic River
- Type: Wild, Recreational
- Designated: November 10, 1978

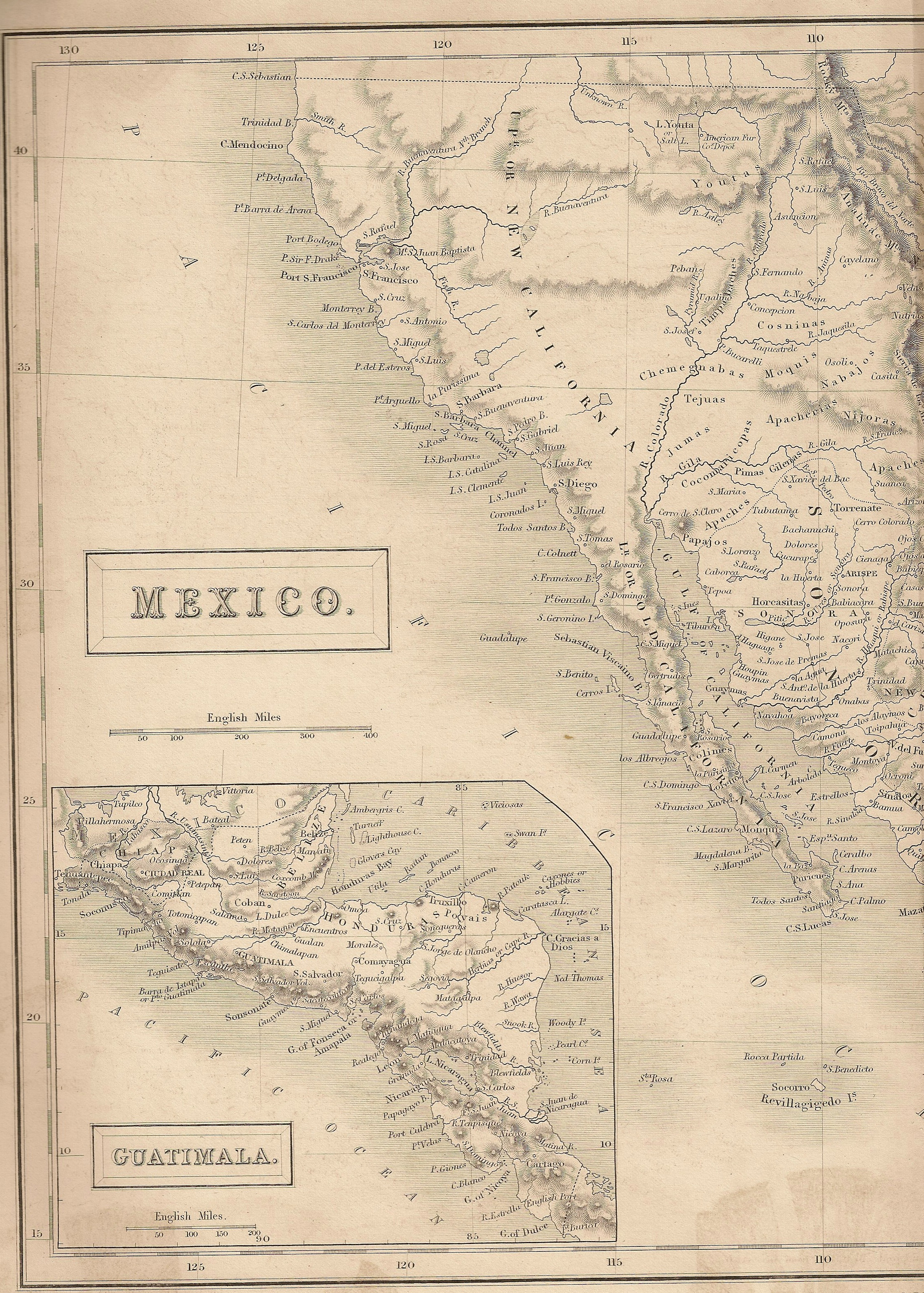
1838 map from Britannica 7th edition, when the river was called Buenaventura River.

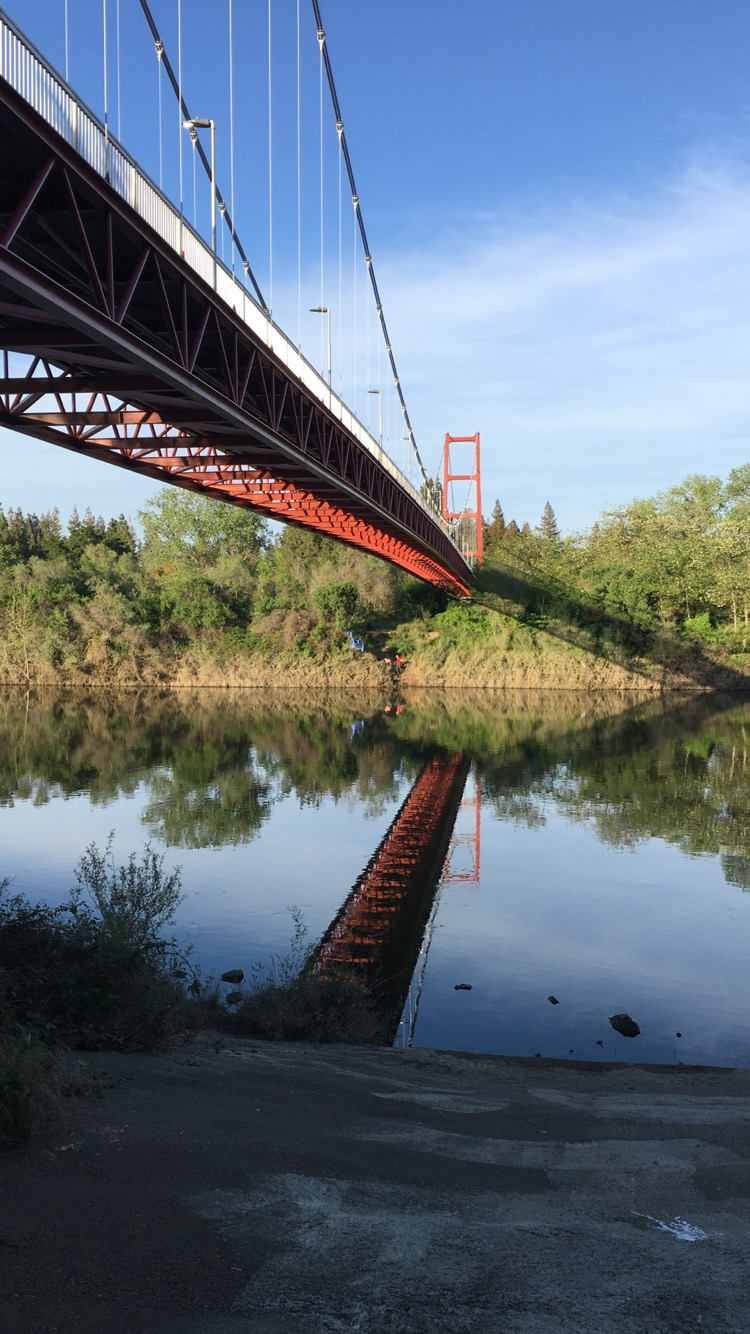
View of the American River from below the Guy West Bridge on the Sacramento State campus

The American River is a 30-mile-long (50 km) river in California that runs from the Sierra Nevada mountain range to its confluence with the Sacramento River in downtown Sacramento. Via the Sacramento River, it is part of the San Francisco Bay watershed. This river is fed by the melting snowpack of the Sierra Nevada and its many headwaters and tributaries, including its North, Middle, and South Forks.

The American River is known for the discovery of gold at Sutter's Mill in Coloma in 1848 that started the California Gold Rush and contributed to the initial large-scale settlement of California by white American migrants. Today, the river still has high-quality water, and it is the main source of drinking water for Sacramento. This river is dammed extensively for irrigation, flood control, and hydroelectric power. The American River watershed supports Mediterranean, temperate, and montane ecosystems, and it is the home of a diverse array of fish and wildlife.

== History ==
The Maidu, Miwok, Nisenan, and Wintun peoples have inhabited the American River area near present-day Sacramento for at least 5,000 years before Spaniards and colonial Americans arrived in the region; human habitation in present-day Northern California is believed to date back as far as 12,000 years. These tribes have utilized the vast amount of resources of the American River for shelter, clothes, baskets, and other goods. Europeans and their descendants arrived in the late 18th century. The Nisenan call the river Kum Sayo, meaning 'roundhouse river'.

Spanish explorer Gabriel Moraga named the river Rio de las Llagas (River of Wounds) when he passed through the area in the early 1800s, perhaps due to hostile relations with local native peoples. Another member of the expedition recorded the name as Rio de los Lagos (River of the Lakes) which may or may not have been an error, as in those times the area of the Central Valley surrounding the American River was home to vast marshes, which would have given the river the appearance of a series of lakes.

During the 1820s, Jedediah Smith led an expedition to the American River with the goal of finding a safe route for colonizers across the Sierra Nevada. After a failed attempt to cross the mountains via the South Fork of the American River, Smith's group managed to cross via Ebbetts Pass on the headwaters of the Stanislaus River, becoming the first non-Natives to do so. During this time, Alta California was part of New Spain, and in Smith's honor the Spanish settlers named the river Rio de los Americanos (American River).

In the 1830s, fur trappers of the Hudson's Bay Company (HBC) visited the area to trap beaver and otter. During one of these expeditions, smallpox or malaria were accidentally introduced to the local Native peoples, who had no immunity to European diseases. Some accounts suggest as much as 70 percent of the indigenous population was wiped out. The surviving natives became hostile to exploitative European settlers and traders for quite some time, and prevented the HBC from establishing a permanent outpost here.

In 1839, Swiss immigrant John Sutter established the New Helvetia settlement on the American River, near the present-day location of central Sacramento. In 1848, following the Mexican–American War, California was ceded to the United States in the Treaty of Guadalupe Hidalgo. Just weeks later, James W. Marshall, an employee of Sutter, discovered gold on the South Fork, starting the California Gold Rush.

Although miners looking to extract gold worked all three forks of the American River, the South Fork held the richest deposits. As the easily accessible placer gold was played out, large companies used hydraulic mining to access gold buried deeper in the soil. This large and extensive mining practice washed away entire mountainsides and heavily polluted all the waterways, including the American River, creating an environmental disaster for inhabitants, fish, birds, and other flora and fauna.

During the Great Flood of 1862 the American River flooded massively, putting much of Sacramento under water for three months. Newly elected Governor Leland Stanford had to travel to his inauguration by rowboat; shortly after, the state government moved temporarily to San Francisco. A significant contributor to the flood damage was the debris washed down by hydraulic mining, which had choked the river channel and reduced its capacity to drain floodwaters. In response, the city of Sacramento undertook a massive project to raise its streets and buildings as much as 9.5 feet (2.9 m). Many of original sidewalks and the first floors of buildings remain as subterranean spaces underneath today's streets.

The lower American River has been one of seven California rivers to achieve the designation "Recreational River" under both the California Wild and Scenic Rivers Act (1972) and the National Wild and Scenic Rivers Act (1980). This status provides state and national recognition to protect the river's outstanding scenic, fish and wildlife, historic, cultural, and recreational values.

== Geography ==
The American River is fed by its North, Middle, and South forks, which are located in El Dorado County, Placer County, and Sacramento County. The river's three forks originate in the Tahoe and Eldorado National Forests. The North and Middle Forks join near Auburn, and continue downstream as the North Fork, although the Middle Fork carries a higher volume of water. The North and South Forks join in Folsom Lake. All three forks are known for their verdant canyons, forested ridges, massive rock formations, trails, back-country winter adventuring among snowy peaks, fishing and white water rafting. There are various fish species that live within the American River such as Chinook Salmon and Steelhead Trout.

The American River headwaters lie along about 50 miles (80 km) along the Sierra Crest from Mount Lincoln in the north (39°17′16″N 120°19′41″W) where it adjoins the watersheds of the South Yuba and Truckee Rivers, to Winnemucca Lake in the Mokelumne Wilderness, where it meets the watersheds of the Mokelumne and Carson Rivers. Lands east of the American River watershed divide drain into Lake Tahoe, which flows into the Truckee River. During most years, a significant snow-pack builds up in the Sierra Nevada which provides water during the hot, dry summers. In warmer winters much of the precipitation may fall as rain instead, causing flooding, but resulting in lower summer flows due to the lack of snow. Due to California's highly variable weather patterns, runoff volumes in the American River can rise and fall drastically from one year to the next.

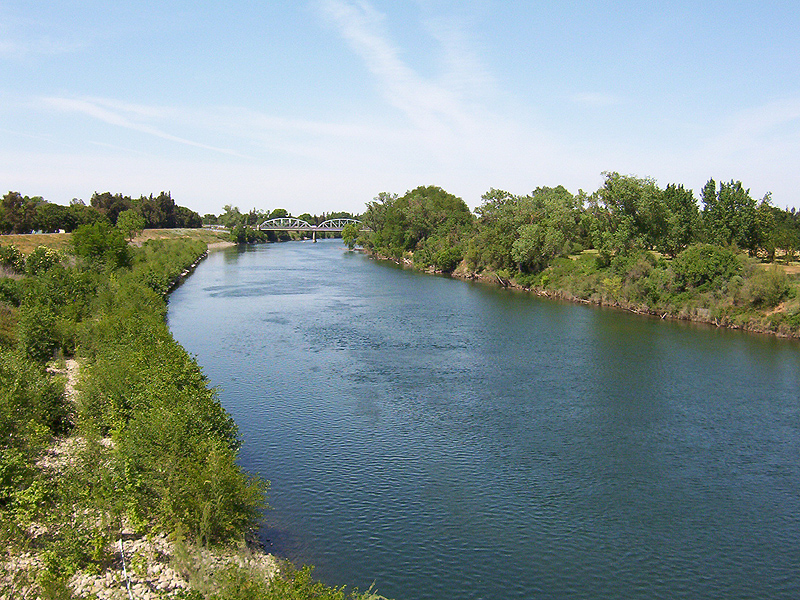
American River view from the campus of California State University, Sacramento

Below Folsom Dam, the river passes through an urbanized area but is buffered by a riparian park, the American River Parkway. Containing fishing and family-oriented rafting, and paved bicycling and multi-use trails, it runs 30.6 miles (49.2 km) from Folsom Lake to the river's confluence with the Sacramento River. The American River Parkway incorporates historic Leidesdorff Ranch, a 35,000-acre (140 km^{2}) cattle and wheat agribusiness owned by the "African Founding Father of California." Jedediah Smith Memorial Trail, a meandering 32-mile (51 km) cycle path, hugs the river bank from Old Sacramento to Folsom Lake. The trail was named for Smith and his men, who camped and trapped along its banks in 1828.

=== North Fork ===
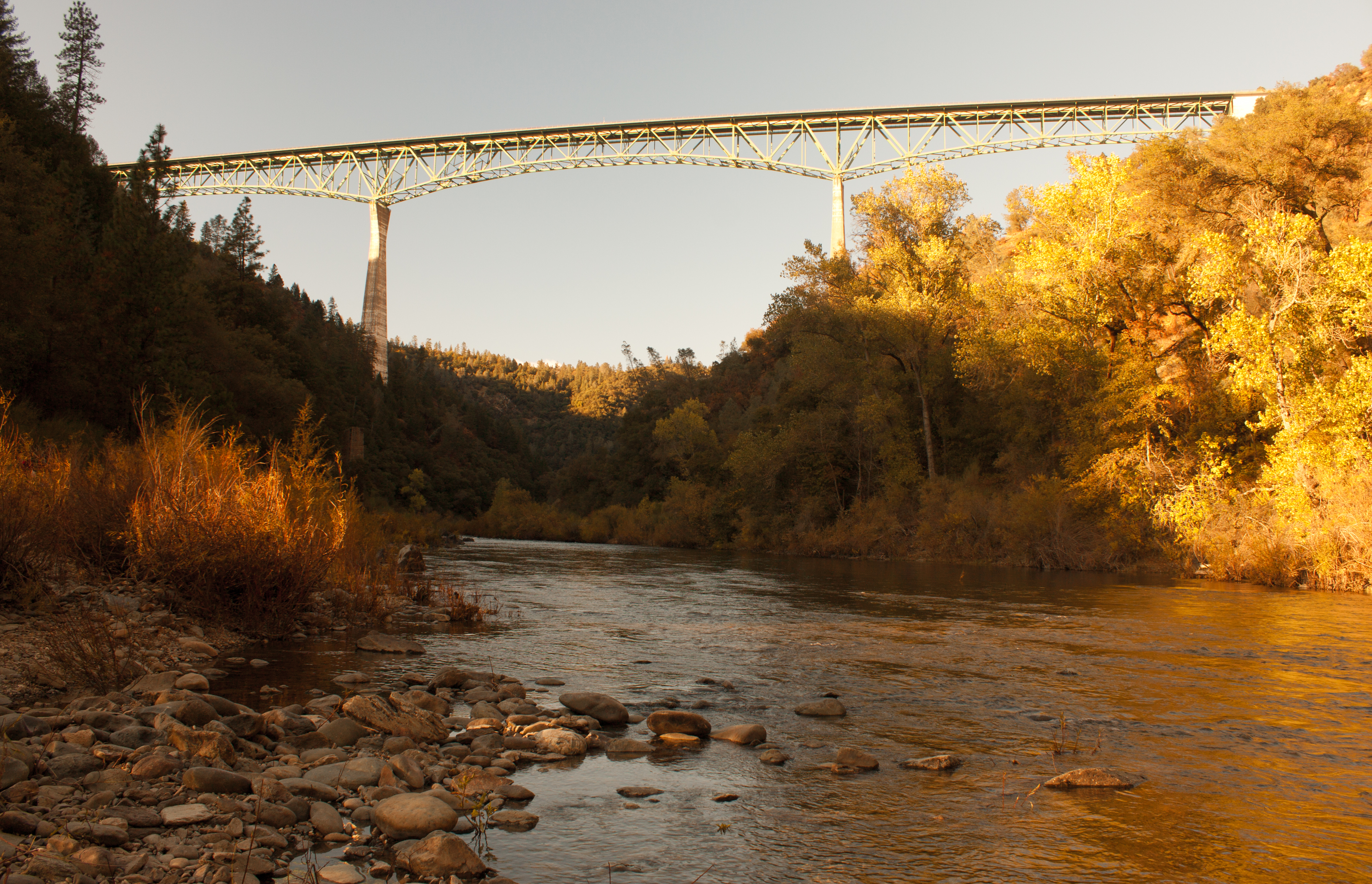
North Fork at Foresthill Bridge

The North Fork is the longest tributary of the American River, at 88 miles (142 km). It begins at an elevation of about 7,900 feet (2,400 m) near Lake Tahoe in Placer County at Mountain Meadow Lake, just northeast of Granite Chief and immediately due west of Palisades Tahoe (formerly Squaw Valley) Ski Resort. It flows westward through remote wilderness areas.

The North Fork and its tributaries provides one of the most biologically diverse habitats in North America. The North Fork features scenic multi-use trails along forested ridge-tops and riparian corridors. It flows freely as a designated National Wild and Scenic Rivers System river until reaching the North Fork Dam, which was built to contain mining debris. This dam creates the small Lake Clementine just north of the Foresthill Bridge and upstream of the confluence with the Middle Fork American River at Auburn. Below the confluence, the North Fork continues several miles until reaching Folsom Lake. Both the North Fork and Middle Fork feature archaeological and historic sites of ancient Native American culture and 1850s Gold Rush habitation.

=== Middle Fork ===
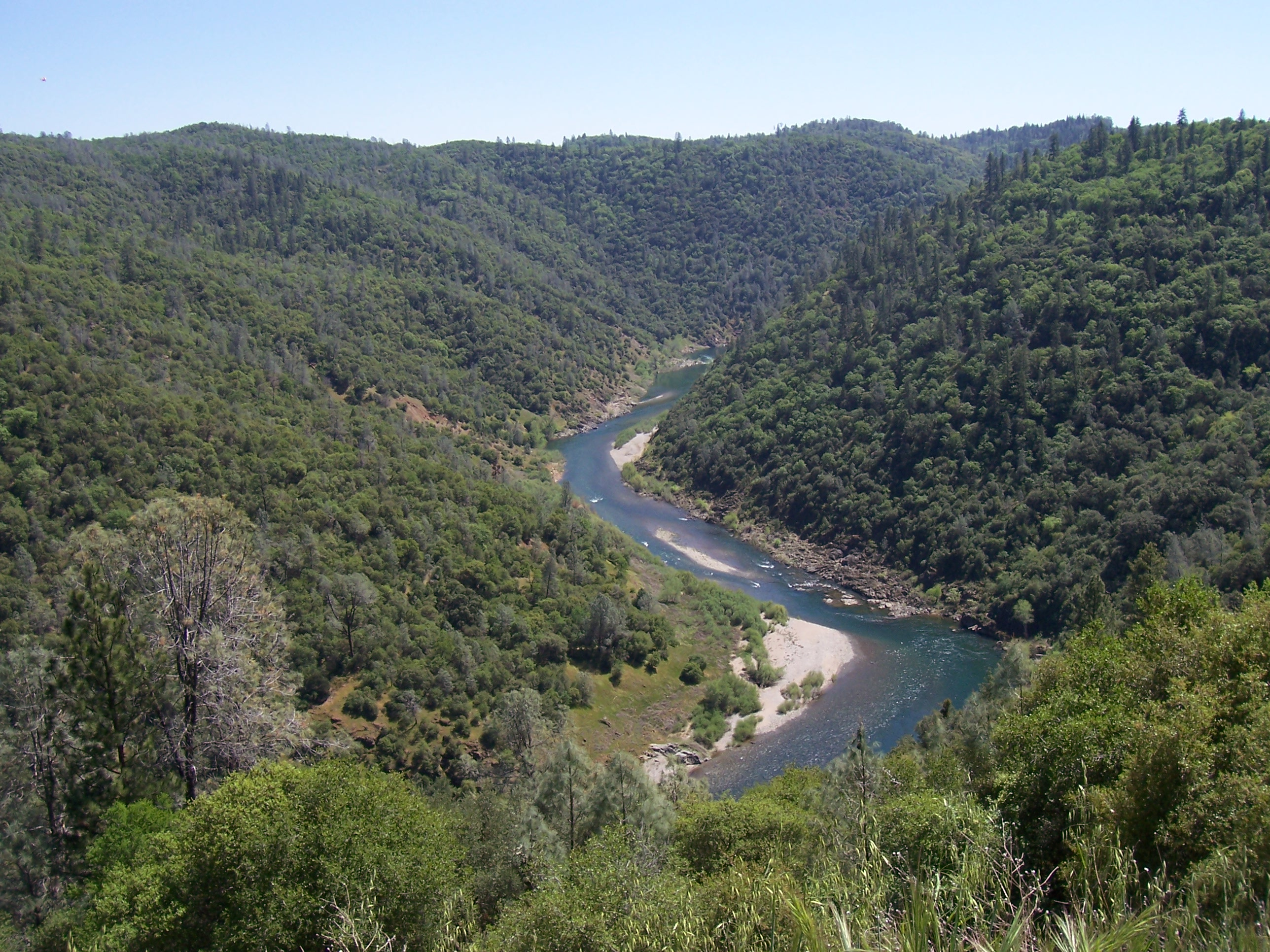
Middle Fork canyon

The Middle Fork is 62 miles (100 km) long. It originates a mere 1.7-mile (2.7 km) from the source of the North Fork on the south face of Granite Chief, between the summit and Emigrant Pass. It is characterized by somewhat broader steep canyons interspersed with reservoirs, waterfalls, and quiet riparian areas. The Middle Fork is used extensively for both motorized and non-motorized recreation, including fishing, white water rafting, bicycling (mountain and road), horseback riding, trail running and hiking. It contains areas used for hydroelectric generation, mining, and agricultural timber cultivation and harvesting. The Middle Fork features part of the Auburn State Recreation Area. The Western States Trail hosts multiple annual endurance events, including the Tevis Cup equestrian trail ride, and the world-famous Western States 100-Mile Trail Run, both beginning at Squaw Valley and leading to Auburn via remote wilderness trails.

=== South Fork ===
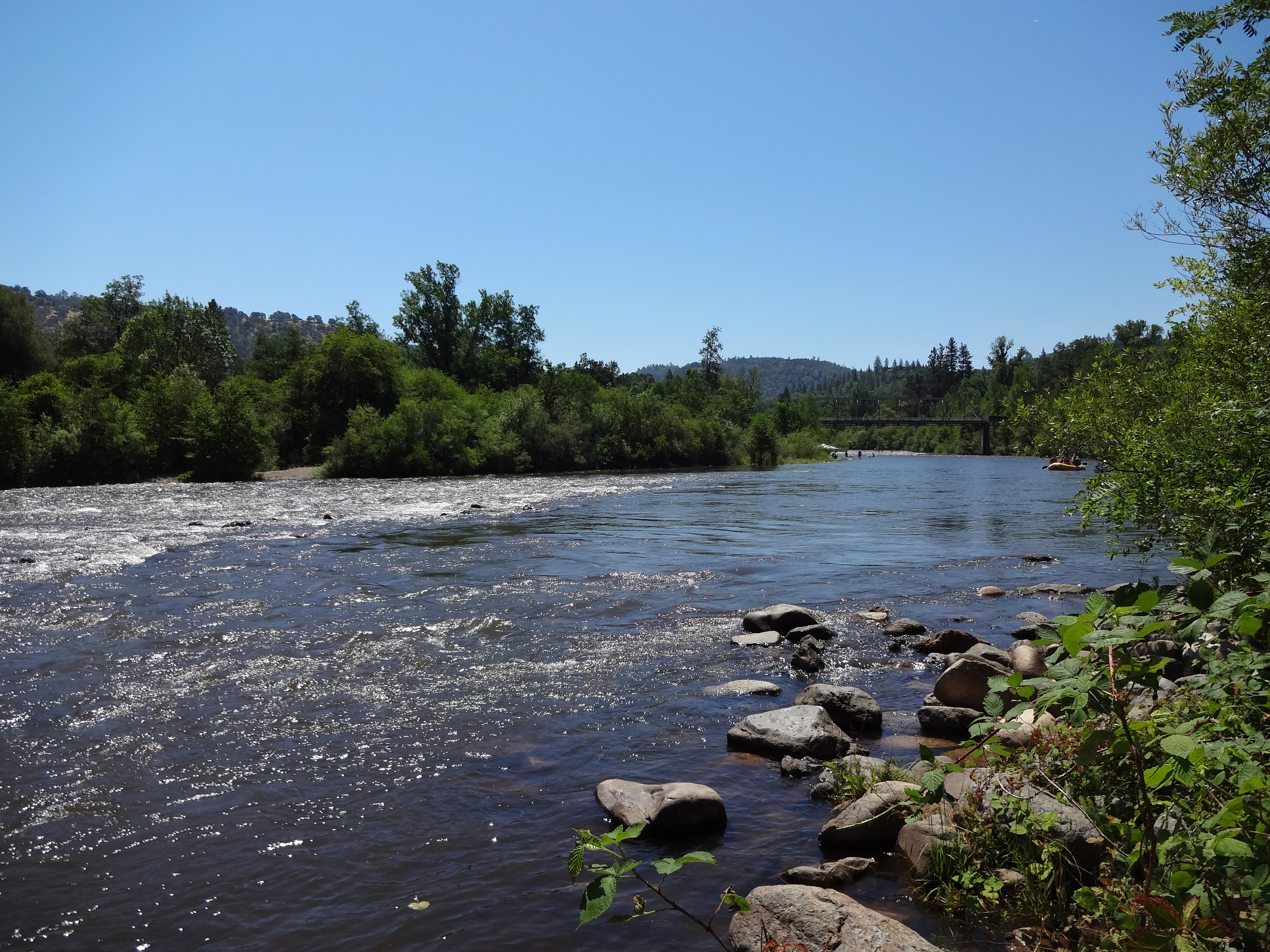
South Fork at Sutter's Mill

The South Fork is 87 miles (140 km) long. It originates at Echo Summit near Echo Lake south of Lake Tahoe in El Dorado County, just south of where U.S. Route 50 makes a sharp curve northward to descend into Tahoe Valley. The South Fork has multi-use recreational areas, including the Rubicon Trail for motorized adventuring and whitewater rafting venues. The South Fork also features the historic town of Coloma, where the California Gold Rush began in 1848. Trout fishing and recreational gold panning are popular activities on the South Fork.

The Silver Fork American River is a 20-mile-long (32 km) tributary of the South Fork American River, that has its origin at Silver Lake.

== Flora and fauna ==
American River running in Coloma

The American River watershed crosses multiple climate zones due to the large range in elevations. The climate of the lower American River valley is Mediterranean and temperate grassland. Sacramento County in particular, where the main stem American River is located, is known for its cool winters and hot summers, with low average precipitation. The North, Middle and South Forks originate in alpine zones along the Sierra Crest and flow through subalpine, montane and temperate coniferous forests. In the foothills, oak woodland and grassland are dominant.

The region is prone to seasonal drought conditions, as about 90 percent of precipitation falls as rain and snow between the months of November and April. Much of the Central Valley was historically wetlands and has extremely fertile soil; today, the vast majority of wetlands have been converted to agriculture or urban areas. Most of the remaining wetland, riparian and aquatic ecosystems are restricted to the narrow corridor along the American River.

There is an abundance of flora and fauna found at the American River that creates an immensely biodiverse ecosystem. Native plants along the American River Parkway are adapted to a Mediterranean climate, are drought tolerant, and help support a balanced, healthy ecosystem. Non-native, and sometimes invasive, species have been introduced to the American River ecosystem. These exotic species have no natural predators and combat with native species for sun, space, and nutrients, causing substantial problems for the native plant life and the entire bionetwork. The American River Parkway Foundation, in collaboration with Sacramento County Parks, manages the invasive plants on the American River.

Fourteen environmental watershed groups are shown to be active in the Upper American River Watershed by the Adopt A Watershed Program of the U.S. EPA. The Upper American River Foundation is a prominent one.

There are over 40 species of native and non-native fish in the American River, including:

- Rainbow trout
- Brown trout
- Chinook (King) salmon
- Coho (Silver) salmon
- Striped bass
- American shad
- Steelhead rainbow trout
- Sacramento sucker
- Carp
- Goldfish
- Sacramento pikeminnow
- Tule perch
- Riffle sculpin

Wildlife in the American River basin includes:

- Mule deer
- Coyotes
- Raccoons
- Owls
- Hawks
- Eagles
- Squirrels
- Beavers
- Rabbits
- River otters
- Over 100 bird species

Invasive plants on the American River include:

- Red sesbania (Sesbania punicea)
- Spanish broom (Spartium junceum)
- French broom (Genista monspessulana)
- Giant reed (Arundo donax)
- Pampas Grass (Cortaderia sellona)
- Chinese Tallow (Triadica sebifera)
- Oleander (Nerium oleander)
- Yellow star thistle (Centurea solstitialis)
- Stinkwort (Dittrichia graveolens)
- Milk thistle (Silybum marianum)
- Catalpa tree (Catalpa bignonioides)
- Chinese tree of heaven (Ailanthus altissima)
- Pyracantha (Pyracantha sp.)
- Tamarisk (Tamarix sp.)

Native plants include:

- California buckeye (Aesculus californica)
- Oregon ash (Fraxinus latifolia)
- (Northern) California black walnut (Juglans californica)
- Foothill pine (Pinus sabiniana)
- Western sycamore (Platanus racemosa)
- Fremont cottonwood (Populus fremontii)
- Blue oak (Quercus douglasii)
- Valley oak (Quercus lobata)
- Oracle oak (Quercus × morehus)
- Interior live oak (Quercus wislizenii)
- California pipevine (Aristolochia californica)
- Coyote brush (Baccharis pilularis)
- Mule fat (Baccharis salicifolia)
- Buck brush (Ceanothus cuneatus)
- Western redbud (Cercis occidentalis)
- Virgin's bower (Clematis ligusticifolia)
- Toyon (Heteromeles arbutifolia)
- Bush lupine (Lupinus albifrons)
- Wild cucumber (Marah fabacea)
- Bush monkeyflower (Diplacus aurantiacus)
- Coyote mint (Monardella villosa)
- Deer grass (Muhlenbergia rigens)
- Purple needlegrass (Nassella pulchra)
- Penstemon (Penstemon spp.)
- California coffeeberry (Frangula californica tomentella)
- Hollyleaf redberry (Rhamnus illicifolia)
- California wild rose (Rosa californica)

== River modifications ==
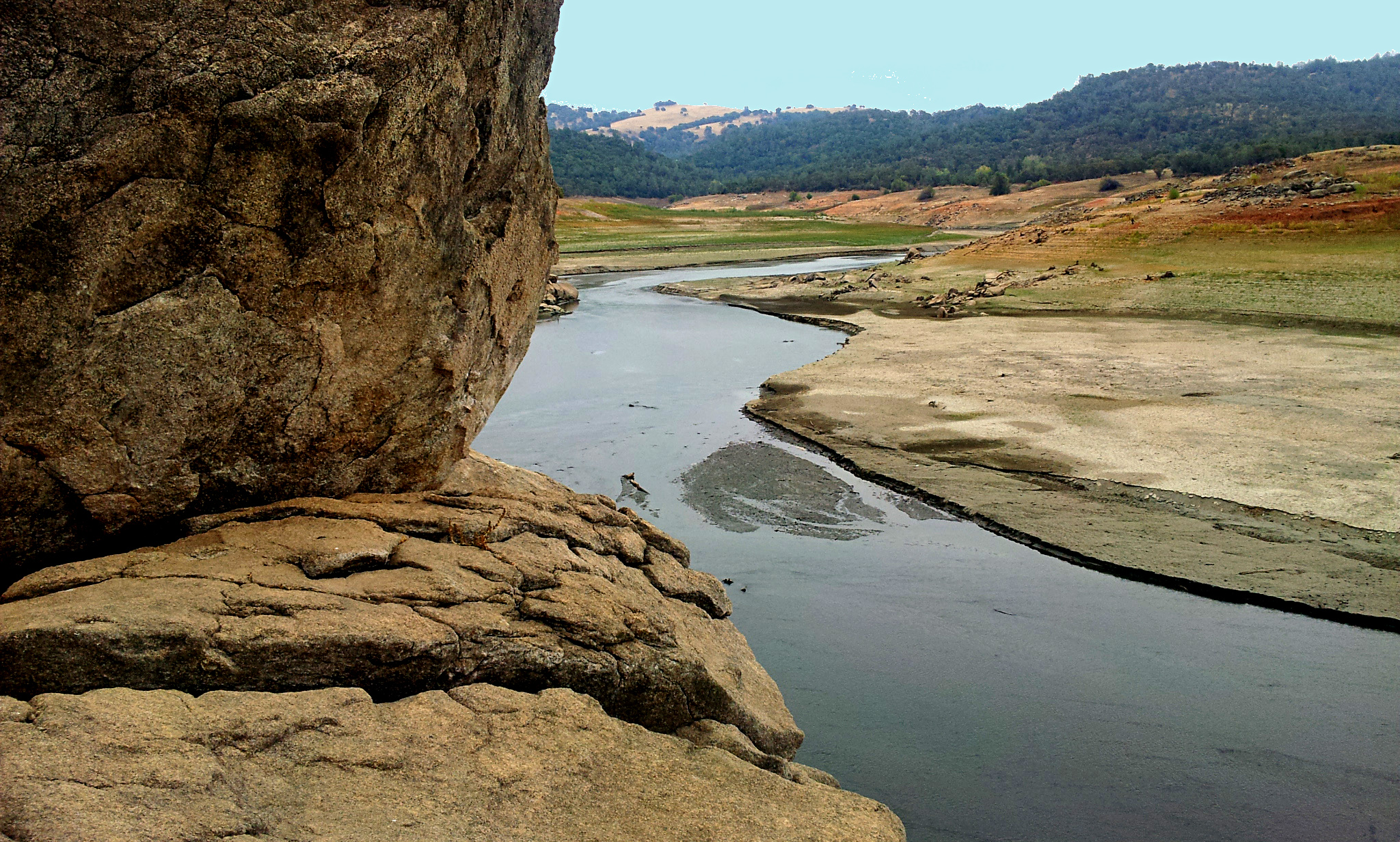
North Fork of American River

Historically, the American River, like many other rivers in California, were modified by the dams of beavers, until European trappers removed many of the beavers from their native habitat for their fur. Since the California Gold Rush was centered in an area that included the American River basin, it was one of the earlier California rivers to be populated, beginning at Leidesdorff Ranch, owned by William Leidesdorff. Water was used to drive grist mills. Gold miners dredged the riverbed and constructed diversion dams for hydraulic mining. Mining activity caused sediment and mercury waste to accumulate in the rivers. The Natoma Company completed its Folsom Powerhouse in 1895 and began delivering power 22 miles (35 km) away to the city of Sacramento to power a streetcar system.

Major flooding of the Sacramento area led to calls for a large dam on the American River by the late 19th century. During the 20th century, the American River was extensively developed for flood control, hydroelectricity production and irrigation. Folsom Dam is the primary flood-control facility for Sacramento. The numerous hydroelectric dams upstream on the Middle and South Forks are not constrained by flood control requirements; rather, the needs of electricity and water supply govern their operation.

=== Central Valley Project ===
Folsom Dam was built in 1955 as a principal part of the Central Valley Project by the Army Corps of Engineers, and is operated by the Bureau of Reclamation. The concrete and earth embankment structure is more than 5 miles (8.0 km) long and creates Folsom Lake, impounding 1.1 million acre-feet (1.4 km^{3}) of water when full. The dam is a multipurpose facility that acts as a reservoir for flood control, irrigation, domestic and industrial use, as well as hydroelectric power generation, recreation, and fish and wildlife habitat. Nimbus Dam is 7 miles (11 km) downstream from Folsom Dam and helps to stabilize peaking power releases from Folsom Dam, and divert water into the Folsom South Canal for irrigation.

=== Upper American River Project ===
Eight hydroelectric plants on the South Fork are operated by Sacramento Municipal Utility District (SMUD) as the Upper American River Project. These plants are fed by a series of reservoirs including Loon Lake, Ice House Reservoir and Union Valley Reservoir. With the exception of Folsom Lake, Union Valley is the largest in the American River watershed, storing 277,000 acre-feet (0.342 km^{3}) of water. The Upper American River Project produces 1.8 billion kilowatt hours in an average year, enough for about 20 percent of Sacramento's electricity needs. The SMUD plants are run on a peaking basis, although recreational boating and environmental flow requirements constrain their operation slightly.

A number of run-of-the-river hydroelectric plants are located further downstream on the South Fork. While they are not operated by SMUD, they depend on the releases from SMUD reservoirs to generate electricity. The El Dorado Irrigation District owns the Akin Powerhouse, and PG&E owns the Chili Bar Powerhouse. The Rock Creek Powerhouse is owned by Sithe Energies.

=== Middle Fork Project ===
The Placer County Water Agency operates five hydroelectric power plants on remote sections of the Middle Fork as the Middle Fork Project, whose primary reservoirs are situated at French Meadows Reservoir and Hell Hole Reservoir. The Middle Fork Project generates 1.03 billion kilowatt hours each year and also provides 120,000 acre-feet (0.15 km^{3}) of domestic water supply.

== Conservation and restoration projects ==
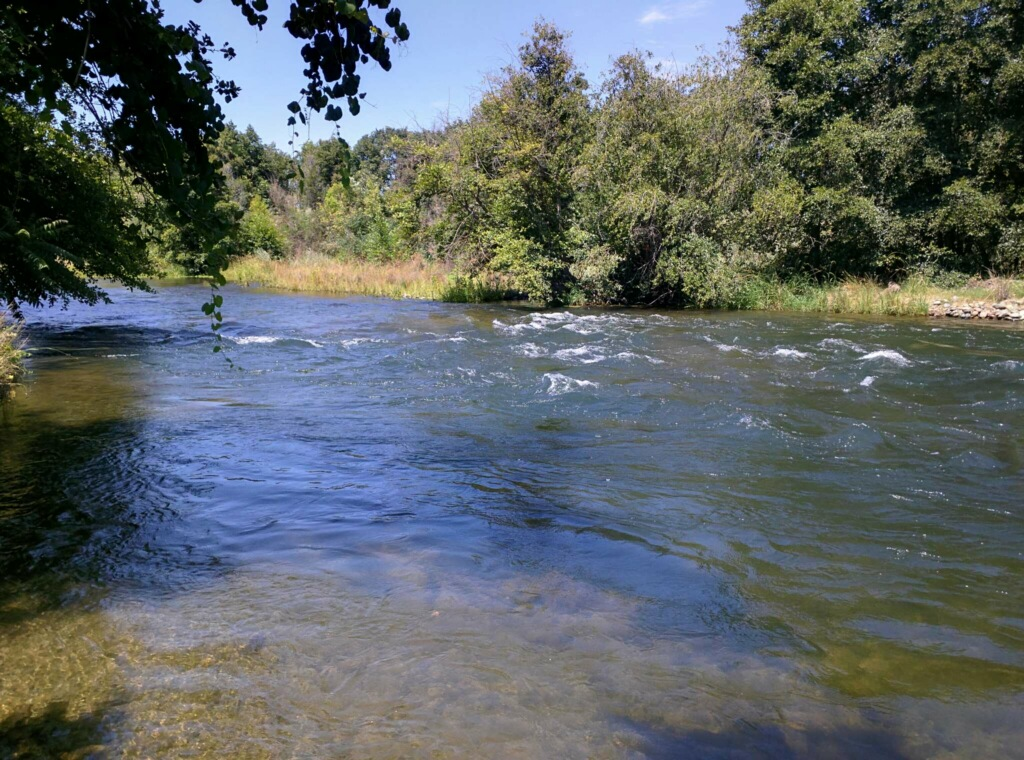
View of the American River from the William B. Pond Recreation Area

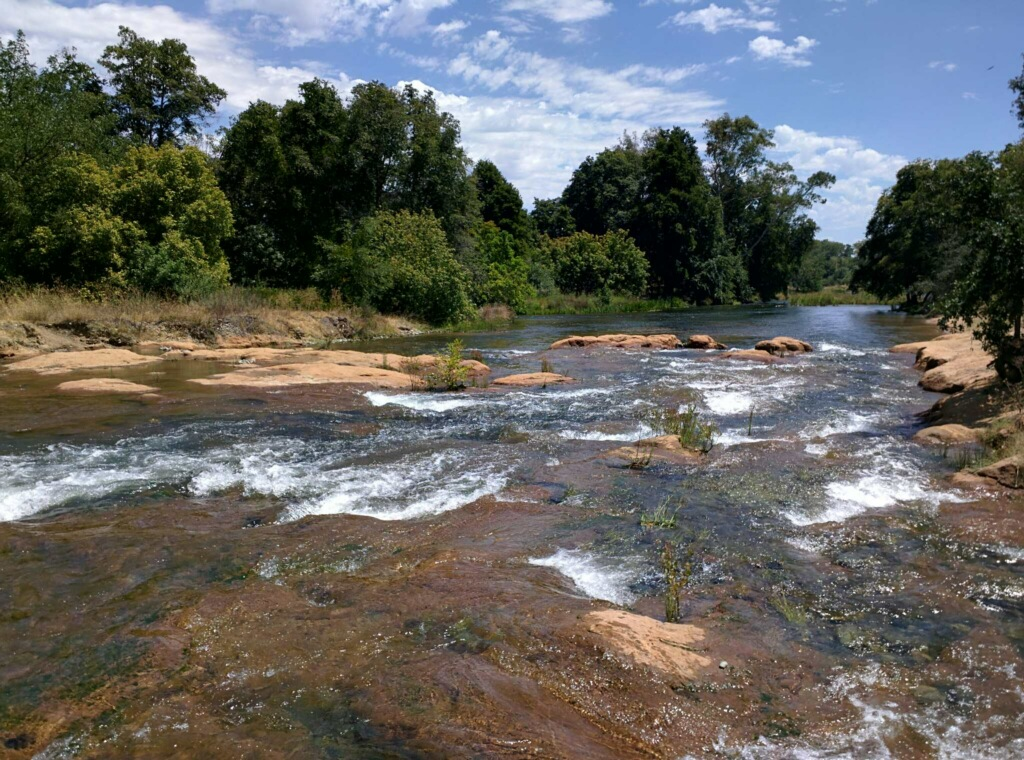
View of the American River from the William B. Pond Recreation Area

The American River Parkway is a 23-mile (37 km) stretch along the American River and includes about 5,000 acres (20 km^{2}) of embankment between the Nimbus Fish Hatchery and where the American River and the Sacramento River converge. The Sacramento County Regional Parks owns most of the land that is operated by the American River Parkway. This area serves the citizens of Sacramento and visitors from away with access to the river and parks, picnic areas, biking and jogging paths, trails for hiking, and habitat for fish and wildlife.

Chinook salmon are a threatened anadromous fish species that have historically used the American River as a location for an important part of their life cycle while in freshwater. The American River, however, has lost some of its natural flow and riverbed because of water projects and diversions. The American River Salmonid Spawning and Rearing Habitat Restoration project, which started in 2008, entails the placement of gravel to provide adequate habitat conducive to the salmonid's needs for spawning and rearing to reach a maturity level fit for the ocean. From 2008 to 2012, the placement totaled 85,880 short tons (77.91 kt) of gravel. The gravel will increase the number of fish redds, spawning nests, along the American River, which will decrease egg retention, and increase birth and survivorship rate. The project also included the introduction of small islands, loose woody debris, and larger boulders to advance the rearing habitat for the anadromous fish and increase biodiversity of the American River.

The American River Conservancy works to conserve the wildlife and their aquatic and terrestrial habitats and resources around the American River and Cosumnes River watersheds. They have protected over 27,000 acres (110 km^{2}) since their inception in 1989. The land they protect helps the American River water quality by conserving and restoring wet meadows, wetlands, and riparian areas. They conserve the diversity of habitats and biodiversity by supporting protected native or endemic species that are listed as endangered or threatened. The American River Conservancy protects the American River watershed to preserve the cultural and historic values of the river systems and the landscapes surround them. They are also invested in keeping the American River for recreational activities as well as its natural scenic views.

In 2000, the Water Forum, a diverse group of business and agricultural leaders, citizen groups, environmentalists, water managers, and local governments working together to balance coequal objectives of providing a reliable and safe water, was formed through the landmark Water Forum Agreement, a long-term plan created to balance two coequal objectives: 1) Provide a reliable and safe water supply for region's economic health and planned development through 2030; and 2) Preserve the fishery, wildlife, recreational, and aesthetic values of the Lower American River. The Water Forum actively works to enhance habitat for salmon and steelhead in the Lower American River in partnership with federal, state and local agencies.

== Recreation ==
The American River is utilized for a variety of recreational uses. Locals and travelers alike use the river's scenic landscape for bird watching, hiking, biking, fishing, river rafting, kayaking, and more. The American River is a clean, biodiverse river that people can safely swim in and do other recreational activities in.

The American River is specifically known for its whitewater rafting. The South Fork has Class III rapids, the Middle Fork has Class IV rapids, and the North Fork has Class IV spring run-off rapids. All three rivers also feature Class II sections. The areas with rapids still feature scenic views and wildlife, which is what makes it the most popular whitewater rafting location in California

The California Office of Environmental Health Hazard Assessment has issued safe eating advice based on levels of mercury and polychlorinated biphenyl for fish caught from the section of the river that flows through Sacramento County.

== See also ==
- Cardwell v. American Bridge Co.
- List of rivers of California
- Folsom Lake
