= Foresthill Bridge =

- Aerial view (2026)
- Coordinates: 38.9224°N 121.0387°W
- Carries: Automobile and pedestrian traffic
- Crosses: North Fork American River
- Locale: North Auburn, Placer County, California

Characteristics
- Total length: 2,428 feet (740 m)
- Longest span: 862 feet (263 m)
- Clearance below: 730 feet (220 m)

History
- Opened: 1973

Statistics
- Daily traffic: low

Location
- Interactive map of Foresthill Bridge

The Foresthill Bridge - also called the Auburn-Foresthill Bridge or the Auburn Bridge - is a road bridge in eastern California crossing over the North Fork American River in Placer County and the Sierra Nevada foothills. It is the highest bridge by deck height in California, the fourth highest in the United States, and among the seventy highest in the world at 730 feet (220 m) above the river.

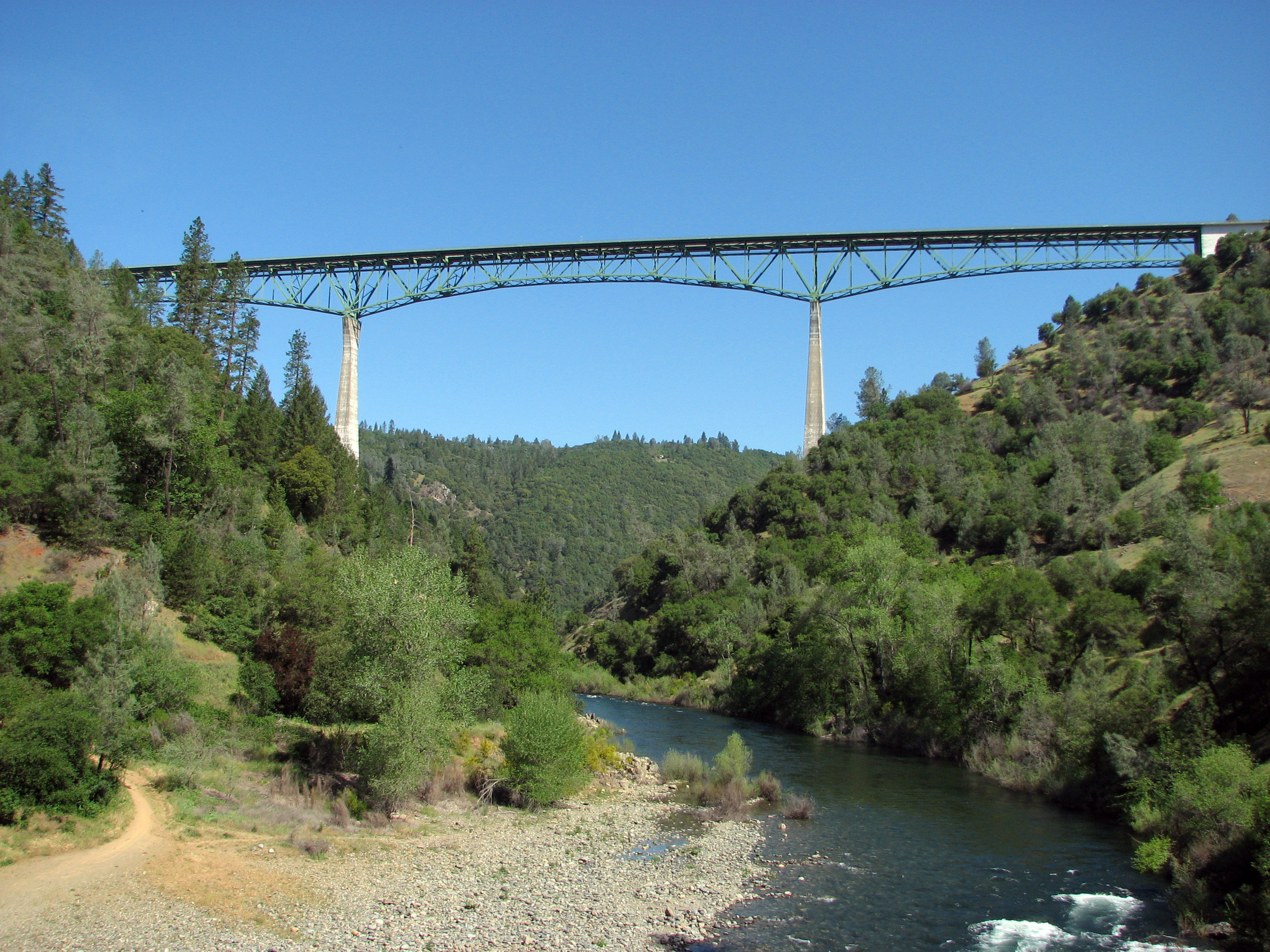
Southern face of the Auburn-Foresthill Bridge

== History ==
Originally constructed to replace a river-level crossing of the American River that would have been flooded by the reservoir that would have been created by the unbuilt Auburn Dam, the deck of the steel cantilever bridge stands 730 feet (220 m) above the river. It was fabricated in 1971 by Kawasaki Heavy Industries in Japan, built by Willamette Western Contractors, and opened in 1973. The four-lane bridge spans the North Fork of the American River in Placer County between the city of Auburn and the town of Foresthill in the Sierra Nevada foothills. Pedestrians can walk the length of the bridge in both directions. There was anti-Auburn Dam graffiti, showing protest of the planned dam, on the bridge's underside.

A seismic retrofit project began in January 2011 and was completed in 2015, with an estimated cost of $74.4 million. The original bridge cost less than $13 million.

== In media ==
The bridge can be seen in the beginning of the 2002 film XXX in which Vin Diesel's character Xander Cage is seen driving a stolen red Chevrolet Corvette off it, then jumping from the car mid-flight and parachuting to his accomplices at the bottom of the American River Canyon.

It also appears in a montage sequence toward the end of the romantic comedy The Ugly Truth, and has been utilized in multiple exercise equipment advertisements.

== Suicides ==
Due to its height, the bridge is a noteworthy suicide site. As of February 2024, there have been 102 suicides since the bridge's construction. As part of the bridge's 2011–2015 renovations, a 6 1/2-foot-tall (2.0 m) pedestrian barrier was installed to prevent further attempts.

== Bridge Fire (2021) ==
The Bridge Fire, which burned under the Foresthill Bridge, started on September 5 and burned for a total of 9 days. 411 acres (166 ha) were burned, with CAL-FIRE reporting one injury.

== See also ==
- List of bridges in the United States by height
- Road bridges in California
- List of suicide locations
