= U.S. Route 50 in California =

Highway in California

U.S. Route 50
- US 50 highlighted in red

Route information
- Maintained by Caltrans
- Length: 108.624 mi (174.813 km)
- Existed: 1926–present
- Tourist routes: US 50 between SR 49 in Placerville and SR 89 near South Lake Tahoe

Major junctions
- West end: I-80 in West Sacramento
- I-5 in Sacramento; SR 99 / I-80 BL in Sacramento; SR 49 in Placerville; SR 89 in South Lake Tahoe
- East end: US 50 at the Nevada state line in Stateline, NV

Location
- Country: United States
- State: California
- Counties: Yolo, Sacramento, El Dorado

Highway system
- United States Numbered Highway System; List; Special; Divided; State highways in California; Interstate; US; State; Scenic; History; Pre‑1964; Unconstructed; Deleted; Freeways
← SR 49	→ SR 51

U.S. Route 50 (US 50) is a transcontinental United States Numbered Highway, stretching from West Sacramento, California, in the west to Ocean City, Maryland, in the east. The California portion of US 50 runs east from Interstate 80 (I-80) in West Sacramento to the Nevada state line in South Lake Tahoe. A portion in Sacramento also has the unsigned designation of Interstate 305. The western half of the highway in California is a four-or-more-lane divided highway, mostly built to freeway standards, and known as the El Dorado Freeway outside of downtown Sacramento. US 50 continues as an undivided highway with one eastbound lane and two westbound lanes until the route reaches the canyon of the South Fork American River at Riverton. The remainder of the highway, which climbs along and out of the canyon, then over the Sierra Nevada at Echo Summit and into the Lake Tahoe Basin, is primarily a two-lane road.

The US 50 corridor is a historic one, used by many 49ers who came to California during the Gold Rush as well as the Pony Express. In 1895, part of the present-day route was designated as California's first state highway, and it was later designated as one of two routes of the Lincoln Highway across the Sierra Nevada. Much of US 50 was constructed during the initial construction of the California state highway system.

== Route description ==
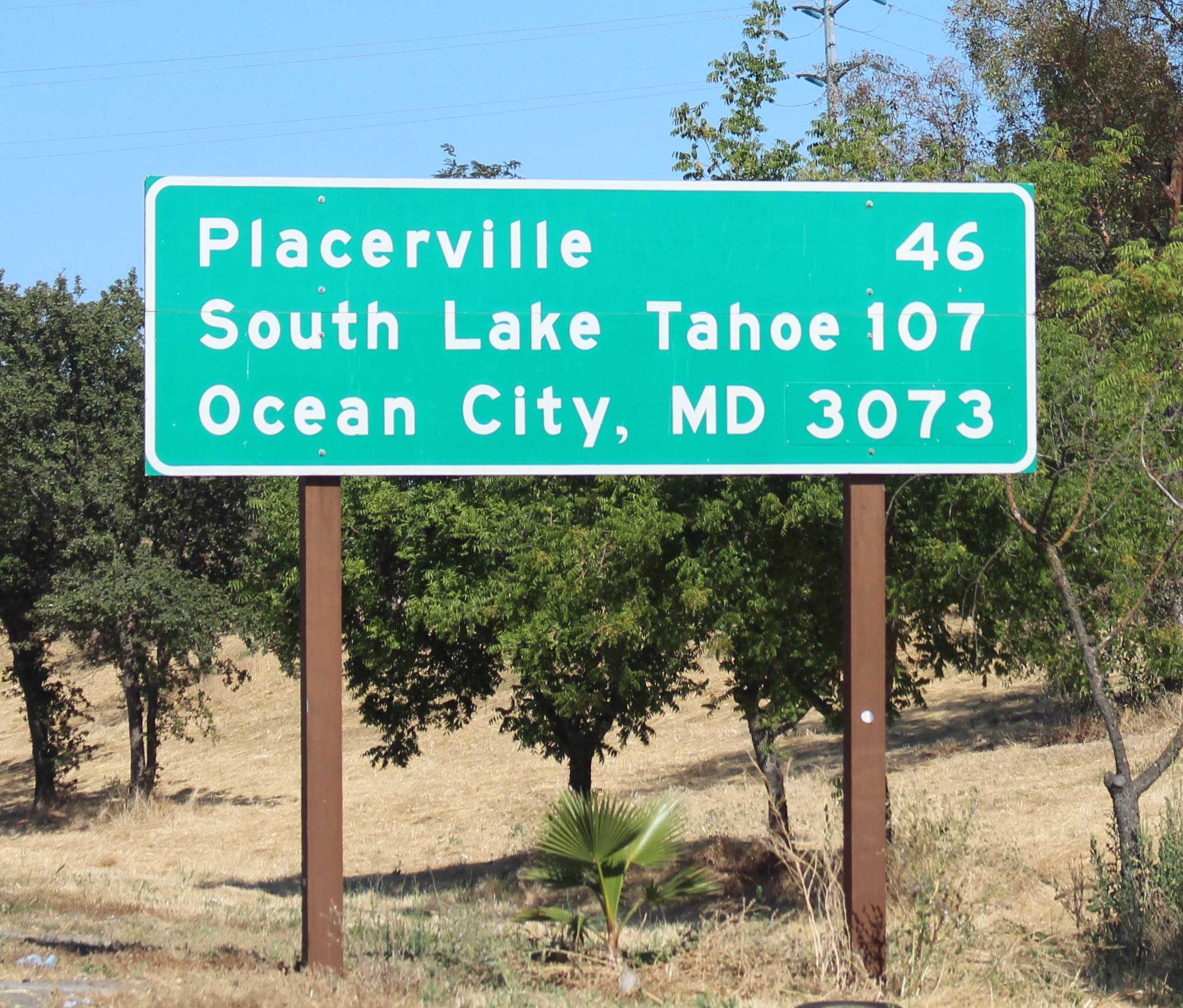
This sign at the west end indicates the distances to Placerville, South Lake Tahoe, and the east end of the route in Ocean City, Maryland

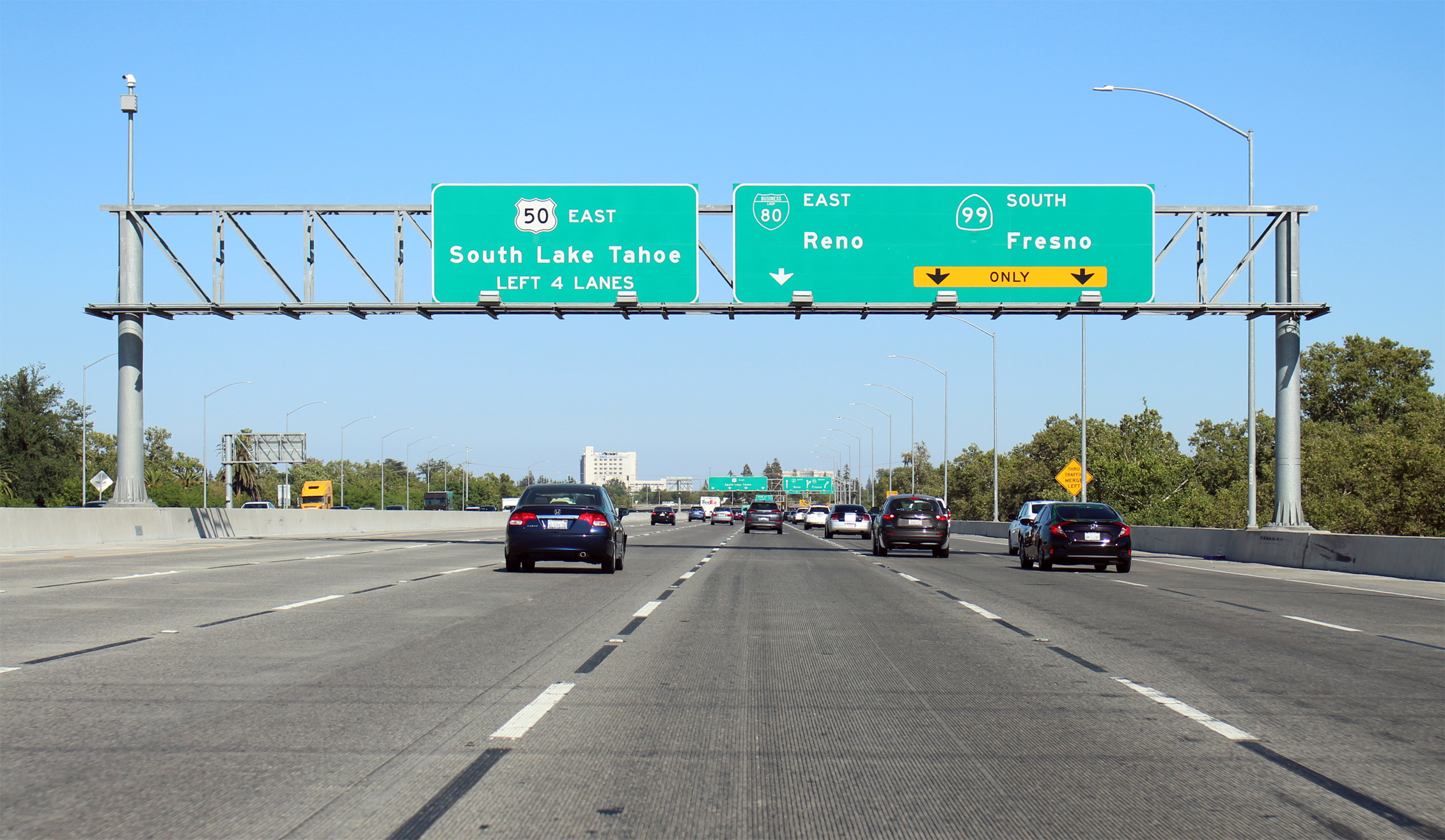
Eastbound US 50 approaching the I-80 BL/SR 99 interchange in Sacramento

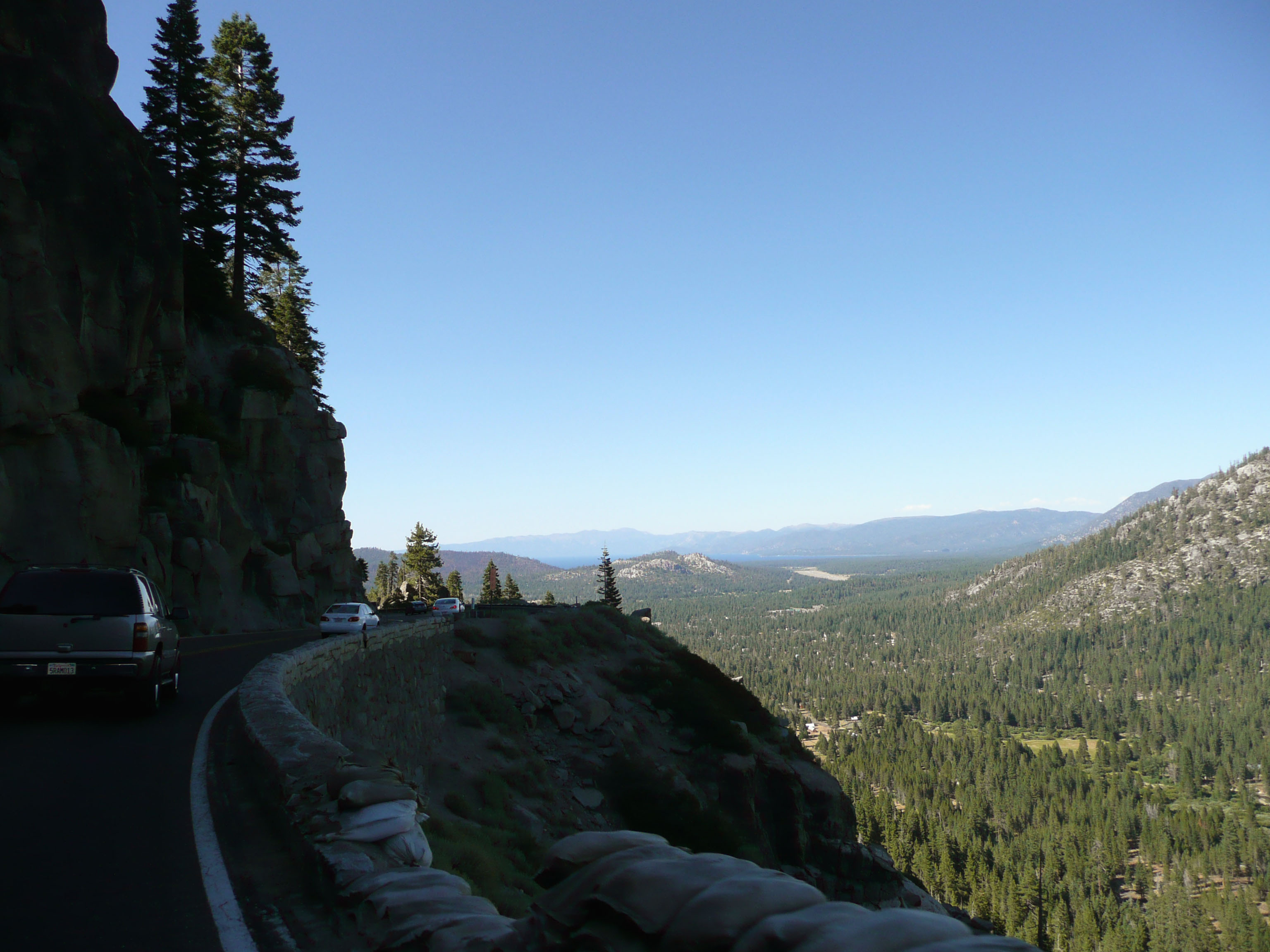
Descending eastbound from Echo Summit towards the Lake Tahoe Basin

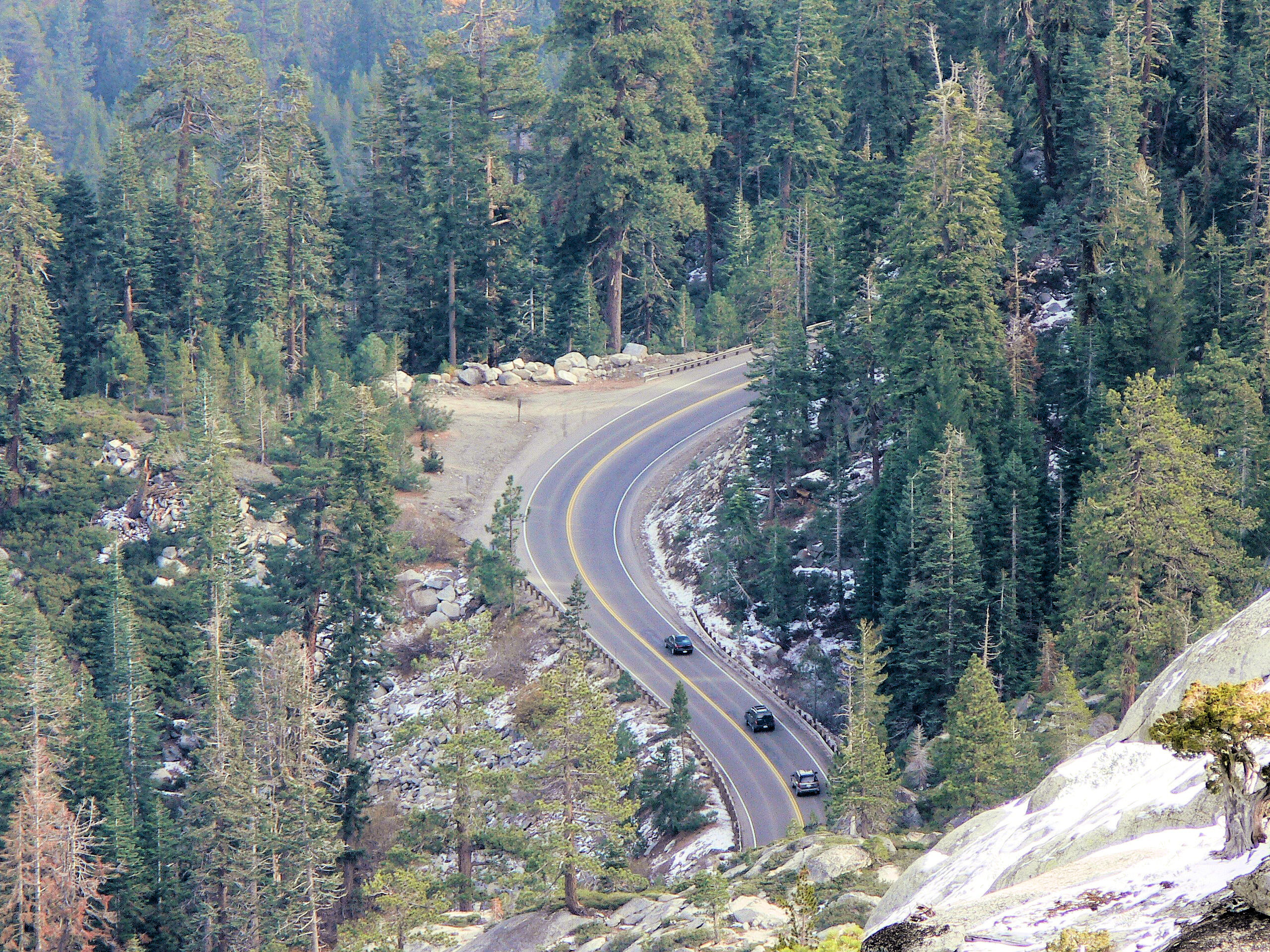
US 50 winds down Echo Summit

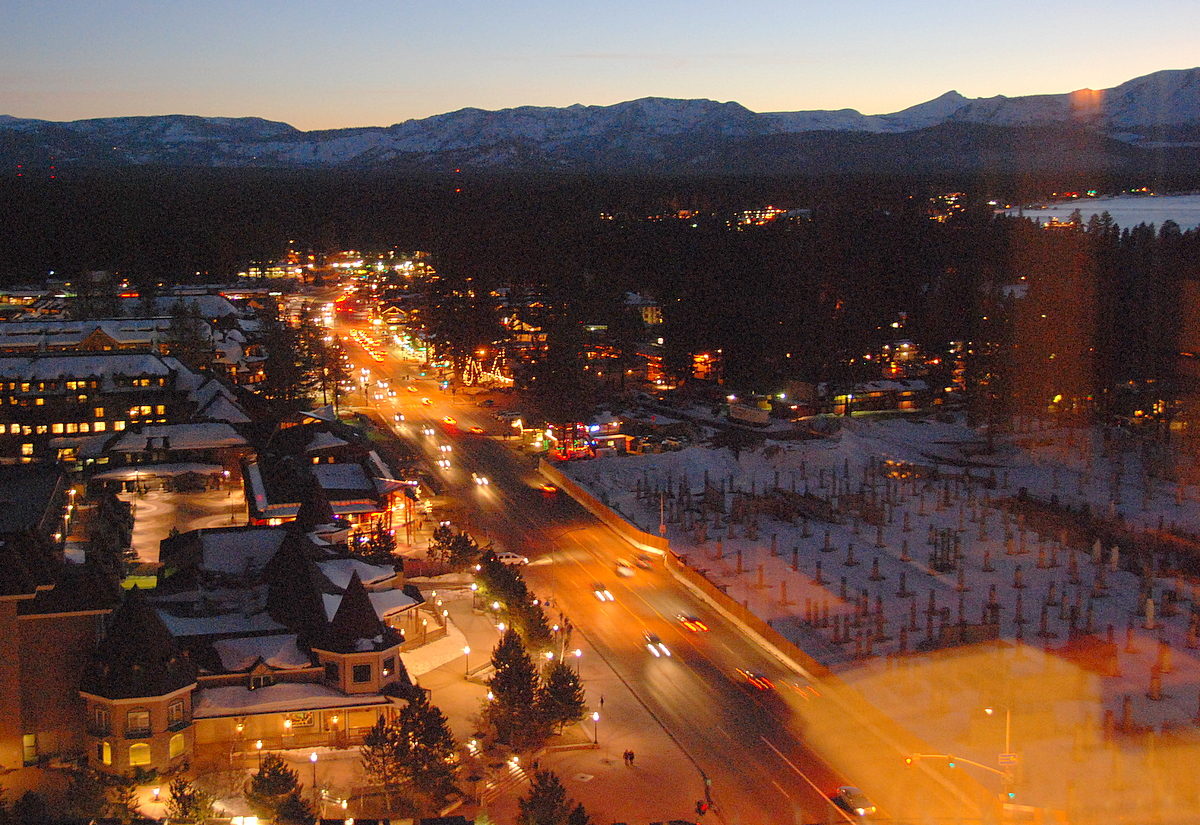
Lake Tahoe Boulevard, where the route leaves California and enters Nevada (Nevada territory would be at the bottom). A tiny portion of Lake Tahoe is visible in the upper right corner

The entire length of US 50 in California is defined in section 350 of the California Streets and Highways Code as simply Route 50, and that the highway is from "Route 80 near Sacramento to the Nevada state line near Lake Tahoe via Placerville". This corresponds with the American Association of State Highway and Transportation Officials (AASHTO)'s U.S. Route logs of US 50.

US 50 begins in West Sacramento, where I-80 leaves the West Sacramento Freeway onto a bypass of Sacramento. At the western terminus, a mileage sign gives the distance to the California cities of Placerville and South Lake Tahoe along with the eastern terminus of the highway in Ocean City, Maryland. The old route of I-80 through Sacramento is signed as US 50 and Business 80 in the western section and Business 80 (Capital City Freeway) in the eastern section. Business 80 overlaps US 50 on the West Sacramento Freeway to the split with SR 275, then over the Sacramento River on the Pioneer Memorial Bridge and across I-5 to SR 99. Beginning in 2016, signs on this section are being updated to remove references to Business 80 and instead sign the route only as US Highway 50. Approximately 6 miles (9.7 km) of US 50 from I-80 to SR 99 south is part Interstate Highway as well, carrying the unsigned designation of Interstate 305.

At the US 50/Business 80/SR 99 interchange, Business 80 splits to the north, SR 99 heads south, and US 50 continues east as the El Dorado Freeway and the Lincoln Highway. This freeway parallels Folsom Boulevard and the American River east-northeasterly through the suburb of Rancho Cordova to Folsom. Entering El Dorado County, US 50 continues eastward through the foothills of the Sierra Nevada via El Dorado Hills, Cameron Park, and Shingle Springs to downtown Placerville. The freeway ends, and US 50 has several at-grade intersections in Placerville, including SR 49.

Leaving Placerville, the expressway through town starts, only to end several miles later. The final section of freeway begins near Camino, where the Lincoln Highway splits from US 50, and ends at the east end of Pollock Pines. Just east of Pollock Pines, US 50 continues as an undivided conventional highway with one eastbound lane and two westbound lanes, entering the river canyon of the South Fork American River near Riverton and crossing to the north side of the river near Ice House Road.

As the highway continues ascending the Sierras, US 50 regularly gets snow at higher elevations from fall to spring. The California Department of Transportation (Caltrans) sometimes requires vehicles to use snow tires, snow chains, or other traction devices in the mountains during and after snowstorms. Checkpoints are often set up to enforce chain restrictions on vehicles bound for icy or snowy areas. When chain restrictions are in effect, vehicles must have chains on the driving wheels, except 4WD vehicles with snow tires. Additionally, during the winter season, trucks are required to carry chains whether or not controls are in force.

From Ice House Road to the crest of the Sierras, US 50 is a steadily rising mostly two-lane road, staying just north of the river except for a 1995 cutoff that crosses the river twice in quick succession west of Kyburz, the boyhood home of ski racer Spider Sabich. Several hairpin turns take the highway up a grade east of Strawberry, after which US 50 continues east alongside the river to its source at Echo Summit. Echo Summit is the highest elevation U.S. Route 50 reaches in California at 7,382 feet (2,250 m). In 1968, it was the site of the U.S. Olympic trials for men's track and field, held at a temporary facility in the parking lot of the Nebelhorn ski area.

From Echo Summit down to the Lake Tahoe Basin, the roadway slowly descends the side of a steep hill; it then curves northeast to its south junction with SR 89 (which heads south to Luther Pass) beginning co-signing of SR 89, and then turns northward near the city of South Lake Tahoe. Where US 50 and SR 89 split, at an intersection known as "The Y", the former turns east on the four-lane Lake Tahoe Boulevard, which it follows to and along the south shore of Lake Tahoe, then it enters the state of Nevada.

US 50 has been added to the California Freeway and Expressway System by the state legislature, and is part of the National Highway System, a network of highways that are considered essential to the country's economy, defense, and mobility by the Federal Highway Administration. The highway east of SR 49 is eligible for the State Scenic Highway System, and has been recognized as such except within the South Lake Tahoe city limits, meaning that it is a substantial section of highway passing through a "memorable landscape" with no "visual intrusions", where the potential designation has gained popular favor with the community.

== History ==
=== Emigrant trails and wagon roads ===
The earliest roads used by Europeans to cross the Sierra Nevada into California were branches of the California Trail. The first route near the present US 50 was the Carson Route, laid out in 1848 by an eastward Mormon party that wanted to avoid the Truckee Route and its deep crossings of the Truckee River. The group left Pleasant Valley, southeast of Placerville, on July 3, following Iron Mountain Ridge up to the crest of the Sierra at Carson Pass and then descending through Carson Canyon into the Carson Valley. Along the Humboldt River in Nevada, the Mormons met Joseph B. Chiles, who was leading a westward wagon train to California, and told him of their new trail. Although this new Carson Route crossed two summits — Carson Pass over the crest of the Sierra and West Pass over the Carson Spur just to the west, these crossings were easier than Donner Pass on the Truckee Route, and only three fords of the Carson River were required. The route became the primary westward route into California at the start of the Gold Rush. Through California, the general alignment of the Carson Route, in terms of today's highways, was State Route 88 over Carson Pass and Mormon Emigrant Trail and Sly Park Road to Pleasant Valley.

John Calhoun Johnson of Placerville surveyed and cleared a shorter, lower (and thus less snow-covered) trail east from that town in 1852, completing the work by the summer. Rather than following the ridge to the Sierra's crest as the Mormons had, Johnson headed eastward to the South Fork American River, crossing to its north side near the present Pacific Ranger Station in order to follow Peavine Ridge around a rocky stretch of the river. Returning to the river between Kyburz and Strawberry, he then continued alongside it to the crest at Johnson Pass, where a steep slope descended to Lake Tahoe. Within Nevada, his route generally followed the lake to Glenbrook, where it turned inland and crossed the Carson Range over Spooner Summit into the Carson Valley near Carson City. This trail, known as Johnson's Cut-off, generally followed the present US 50, with notable deviations only just east of Placerville (via Carson Road), over Peavine Ridge (roughly following Peavine Ridge Road, some trails, and Wrights Lake Road), just east of Strawberry (via Slippery Ford Road), over the crest of the Sierra (via Johnson Pass Road and Meyers Road), south of Lake Tahoe (via Pioneer Trail), east of Lake Tahoe (via Genoa Peak Road), and from Spooner Summit into the Carson Valley (via Kings Canyon Road). By 1854, Bartlett's Bridge had been built at the trail's westernmost crossing of the American River, allowing wagons to follow the cutoff; it was soon washed away by a freshet on March 7, 1855, and replaced by Brockliss Bridge, several miles to the east. Due to an improvement of the road through Carson Canyon on the old Carson Route, most travelers ended up turning southeast from Johnson Pass over Luther Pass (present SR 89) to join the older route northeast of Carson Pass rather than following the cutoff along Lake Tahoe.

Johnson's Cut-off was the only trail that could be used year-round, but it still had problems, as it had been built without use of earth-moving equipment, and thus did not always take the optimal route. The state adopted a survey by Sherman Day in September 1855, but failed to make use of it. Two years later, the counties of Yolo, Sacramento, and El Dorado, all of which would be benefited by further improvements, began planning and carrying out work. The state legislature created a "Board of Wagon Commissioners" on March 8, 1858, and it completed the improvements by the end of that year. This new route had better grades than the old cutoff, deviating from it in several places: it followed the present Smith Flat Road rather than Carson Road east of Placerville, traversed Peavine Ridge much further down the slope, returning to the river west of Kyburz (roughly via the present White Meadows Road, Ice House Road, and Weber Mill Road to US 50 at Granite Springs Road), and crossed into Carson Valley via Luther Pass. By 1860, the immense traffic over the road and lack of maintenance had worsened it to the point that it could no longer be used by stagecoaches.

To provide for better maintenance, improvements funded by tolls were authorized. The first of these was built and operated by Kingsbury and McDonald, who improved the old Johnson's Cut-off between Johnson Pass and Stateline, where they turned east over Daggett Pass (now SR 207) in Nevada, connecting Lake Tahoe to the Carson Valley via a shorter route than that over Luther Pass. Two other competing toll roads soon opened across the Carson Range: one built by Rufus Walton from Spooner Summit down Clear Creek to the valley (now part of US 50), and an 1863 improvement of the original Johnson's Cut-Off along the lake, across Spooner Summit, and through Kings Canyon to Carson City. West of Johnson Pass, the Slippery Ford Grade down to Strawberry was rebuilt by George W. Swan. The first toll-supported bypass of Peavine Ridge was built by Oglesby and opened in 1861, leaving the old road from Placerville at Pollock Pines, following the ridgetops and slopes south of the South Fork American River, crossing the river east of White Hall, and then following US 50 along the north bank to the 1858 county road west of Kyburz. Johnson began work on a lower-grade replacement on the north side of the river in 1864, but stopped when Pearson and McDonald opened a road over the present alignment of US 50, leaving the pre-1861 main road southwest of Brockliss Bridge and following US 50, across the river at Riverton, to Oglesby's road east of White Hall. Toll collection ended in California in 1886, when El Dorado County bought the privately improved sections and made them public roads.

West of Placerville, the wagon road headed south to Diamond Springs, where it turned west along the original Carson Route over relatively gentle terrain to Sacramento, generally following the present US 50 on parallel surface roads, such as Pleasant Valley Road and White Rock Road. The Pony Express used this route from its beginning in April 1860 until July 1, when its western terminus became Folsom on the Sacramento Valley Railroad. (The route was further cut back to Placerville, where messages were passed to the telegraph, from July 1861 to its discontinuance in October.) The Placerville and Sacramento Valley Railroad reached Latrobe in 1864, Shingle Springs (on the old Carson Route west of Placerville) in 1865, and was finally completed to Placerville in 1888. As the railroad extended east, the western terminus of the stage lines followed; the completion of the First transcontinental railroad in 1869 took most of the traffic off the Placerville wagon road.

=== State maintenance and reconstruction ===
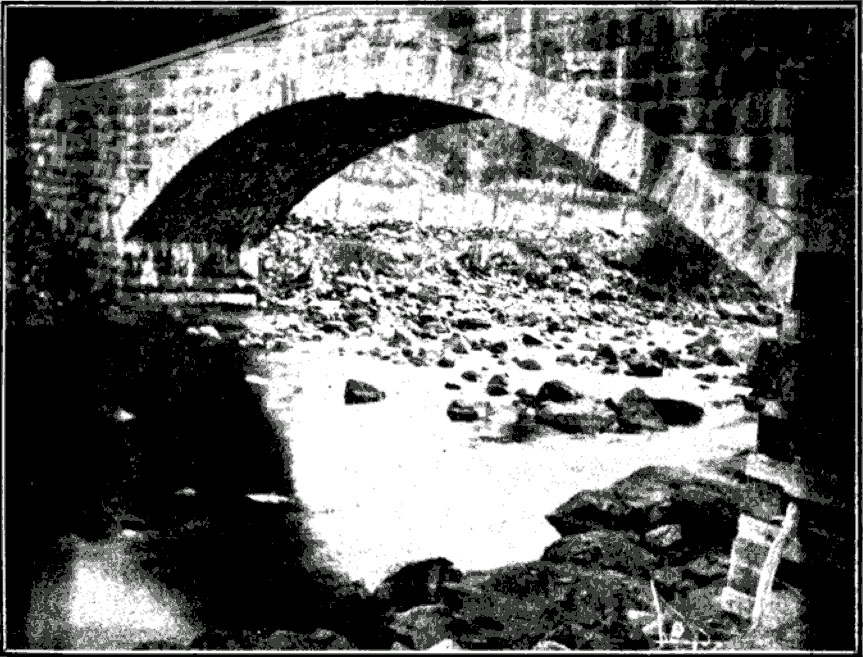
The 1901 bridge at Riverton

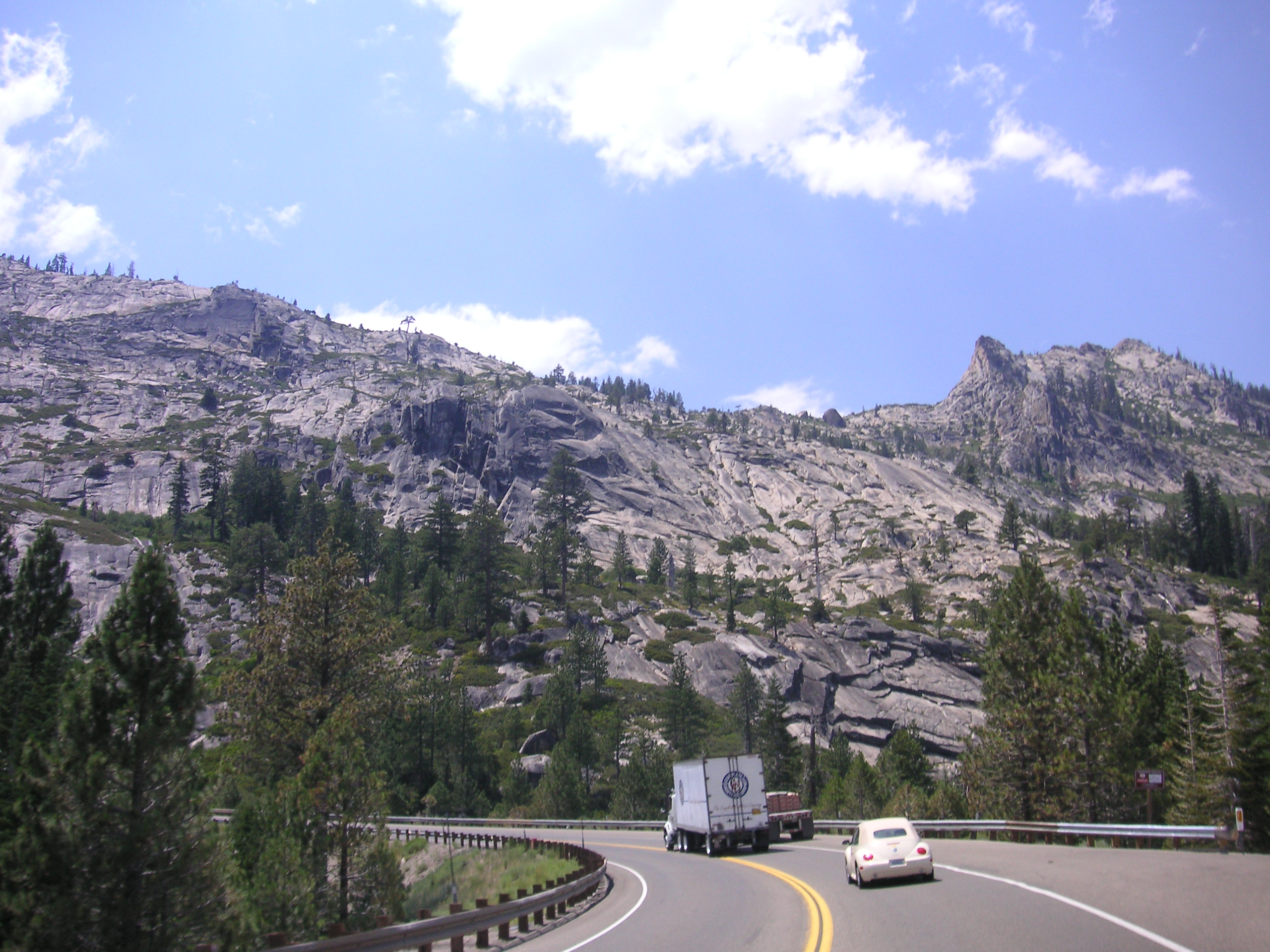
Westbound at the bottom of the 1947 grade to Echo Summit

At the dawn of the automobile era, the state legislature authorized California's first state road on March 26, 1895, by creating the post of "Lake Tahoe Wagon Road Commissioner" to maintain the road from Newtown Road near Smith Flat (just east of Placerville) to Nevada. The county deeded the 58-mile (93 km) road to the state on February 28, 1896. Funding was only enough for minimal improvements, including a new stone bridge over the South Fork American River at Riverton in 1901. The Department of Engineering took over its maintenance in 1907, immediately completed a survey and posted granite milestones that marked the distance from Placerville, and in 1910 started sprinkling the dirt road with water in summer to keep down dust (as had been done in the 1860s). A 1915 law added the short distance from Smith Flat west to the east limits of Placerville to the state road.

With the passage of the first state highway bond issue in 1910, the Department of Engineering was directed to lay out and construct a system connecting all county seats. Placerville, seat of El Dorado County, was connected to Sacramento by the 46.5-mile (74.8 km) Route 11, which followed Folsom Boulevard from Sacramento to Folsom, Bidwell Street and Placerville Road to White Rock, the old Carson Route to El Dorado, and Forni Road and Placerville Drive to Placerville. Between El Dorado and Placerville, the state had two routes to choose from, including one via Diamond Springs (present SR 49), where it decided improving a cut would be too expensive. Instead, it chose the "O'Keefe grade" (Forni Road), following the old road for about 4 miles (6 km) and then building a cutoff (now part of Placerville Drive) to the Green Valley road. In 1917 the mileage that had been added by special laws, rather than as part of bond issues, was consolidated with the rest of the system, and Route 11 was extended east to the state line. (The route was extended farther, from Sacramento southwest to Antioch via present SR 160, in 1933.) The third bond issue, passed in 1919, included funds for the improvement of 10 miles (16 km) from Placerville east to Sportsman's Hall, by which time paving was complete west of Placerville.

The Lincoln Highway, one of the earliest marked highways across the country, split in two over the Sierra Nevada. The main route followed the present I-80 alignment over Donner Pass, but an alternate "Pioneer Branch", designated as part of the initial routing in 1913, turned south at Reno, Nevada to Carson City and then crossed the Sierras via Johnson Pass and the Placerville route. Contrary to the Lincoln Highway Association's policy of marking the most direct route, this deviation was explained simply as "for those tourists desiring to see Lake Tahoe." However, it actually became shorter in 1921, when the Fallon Cut-off opened from Carson City directly east to the main route near Fallon, bypassing Reno. The U.S. Highway system was created in 1926, and this route (along with the main Lincoln Highway east of the cutoff) became part of US 50. (The Donner Pass route was US 40, crossing Nevada on the Victory Highway.) US 50 initially ended in Sacramento, where motorists could follow US 40 (Victory Highway) southwest to the San Francisco Bay Area or turn south over US 99 to Stockton and take US 48 (Lincoln Highway) west over Altamont Pass. Originally, US 48 was a road connecting the Bay Area with the San Joaquin Valley, traveling from San Jose to near Modesto, largely following the future routing of US 50, which replaced US 48. Its western terminus was located near the present location of the I-238/I-880 interchange. It generally followed the route of current I-580 to the I-205 junction. From here, US 48 continued east on I-205, then followed Old Highway 50 (present I-205 Bus.) through Tracy, thence to I-5. It then followed I-5 to SR 120, where US 48 followed SR 120 to the old location of the SR 99/SR 120 interchange (present day intersection of Main and Yosemite in Manteca), the location of its eastern terminus. At this time, US 50 was improved but unpaved east of Placerville. As part of the state project to pave this portion, the old road was bypassed in several areas, completing the final two-lane alignment. These realignments included Broadway, bypassing Smith Flat Road, at Smith Flat (1932), a new route around Slippery Ford Grade east of Strawberry (1931), and a new route through South Lake Tahoe, leaving behind Pioneer Trail (1931). The crossing of the Sierra crest at Johnson Pass was bypassed in 1940 by a better-quality route over Echo Summit; the lower part of the current road east of the summit opened in 1947, bypassing Meyers Road. West of Placerville, several major two-lane relocations were built. A bypass (now Mother Lode Drive) around El Dorado and the winding Forni Road was completed in 1938, and the improvement was extended west to Shingle Springs in 1947. A short relocation north of White Rock, between Bidwell Street and Bass Lake Road, opened in 1940, and was extended west beyond Hazel Avenue, bypassing Folsom, in 1949.

==== Extension to San Francisco ====
By the early 1930s, US 50 had been extended to San Francisco via the former US 48 by overlapping US 99 from Sacramento to Stockton and replacing US 48 over Altamont Pass to US 101E (Foothill Boulevard at Castro Valley Boulevard) near Hayward. It was extended over the new Bay Bridge at the time of its opening in 1936, replacing US 101E on Foothill Boulevard and the present MacArthur Boulevard to the Bay Bridge Distribution Structure in Oakland. As the new MacArthur Freeway (now I-580) was constructed, US 50 was moved to it. This extension was officially eliminated in the 1964 renumbering, but it remained on maps and signs for several more years before being replaced by I-80 over the Bay Bridge, I-580 over Altamont Pass, I-205 Bus. through Tracy, I-5 to Stockton, SR 4 (Charter Way) and SR 26 through Stockton, and SR 99 to Sacramento.

=== Freeway and expressway upgrades ===
Interstate 305
- Location: Sacramento
- Length: 6 mi (9.7 km)

When the California Freeway and Expressway System was created in 1959, it included US 50 from Sacramento to Nevada. (The Oakland-Sacramento portion was also included, mostly as part of the Interstate Highway System.) Two segments had already been upgraded to freeway or expressway standards — an expressway through Placerville, championed by its mayor Alexander Howison Murray Jr. and completed in 1955, and a freeway bypass of Camino with an expressway continuing west to Five Mile Terrace, completed in 1957. From Pollock Pines east to the bridge at Riverton, the road was widened to four lanes in about 1960. The next decade saw the improvement of every remaining two-lane section between Rancho Cordova (near Sunrise Boulevard) and Riverton, with the final section, connecting Bass Lake Road and Shingle Springs, opening in July 1970. The freeway was completed west to the then-I-80 freeway (now Business 80) and SR 99 in early 1973, bypassing the mostly four-lane Folsom Boulevard.

In 1980, California submitted to the American Association of State Highway and Transportation Officials (AASHTO) proposals to relocate I-80 in Sacramento onto the then-I-880 bypass freeway, extend US 50 west to cover the west half of old I-80, also assign I-305 to the west half of old I-80, and delete I-880 in the Sacramento area (the route would eventually be relocated to then-SR 17 from I-280 in San Jose to I-80 in Oakland in 1982–1984). AASHTO approved these proposals. The next year, the California State Legislature officially extended US 50 west to cover the western half of old I-80. Since Business 80 was not a valid legislative designation, the eastern half was assigned State Route 51. But the California State Legislature has never added a legislative designation for I-305, and that Interstate remains unsigned to this day.

For many years, the four lanes from Sacramento stopped at Riverton, where the original two-lane road continued through the canyon and over Echo Summit. The state rejected a proposed $133 million total realignment between Riverton and Kyburz in 1985, instead opting for a less expensive program of spot improvements including new bridges and passing lanes. Portions of the work were completed by 1987, including a four-lane bridge at Riverton (though two lanes are used by traffic turning at Ice House Road at the east end of the bridge). Between White Hall and Kyburz, a pair of four-lane bridges over the South Fork American River, carrying a realignment across a bend in the river, were dedicated on May 31, 1995, as the El Dorado County Veterans Bridges.

The route through the South Fork American River Canyon remains vulnerable to mudslides and other storm damage. One particularly bad slide closed the highway east of Riverton for 28 days from January 24 to February 21, 1997, only a week after a similar 17-day closure caused by flooding on January 1. A project to make more permanent repairs and prevent future closures began on July 31, and from September 2 to October 24 the highway was closed during the week to allow for more efficient reconstruction. The state signed the detour, which followed Sly Park Road, Mormon Emigrant Trail (the old ridgetop Carson Route), SR 88, and SR 89 (over Luther Pass), as Alternate U.S. Route 50, a designation not approved by the American Association of State Highway and Transportation Officials, which generally assigns new bannered U.S. Highways. After the work was complete, signs were left along the route.

The proposed Yolo 80 Corridor Improvements Project would add high-occupancy toll (HOT) lanes along the segment of US 50/Business 80 between I-80 in West Sacramento and I-5 in Sacramento by the end of the 2020s.

== Major junctions ==
Except where prefixed with a letter, postmiles were measured on the road as it was in 1964, based on the alignment that existed at the time, and do not necessarily reflect current mileage. Postmile prefixes include: R reflecting a realignment in the route since then, M indicating a second realignment, L referring to an overlap due to a correction or change, and T indicating postmiles classified as temporary. Segments that remain unconstructed or have been relinquished to local control may be omitted. The numbers reset at county lines; the start and end postmiles in each county are given in the county column.

County	Location	Postmile	Exit	Destinations	Notes
Yolo; YOL 0.00–3.16	West Sacramento	0.00		I-80 west – San Francisco	Western terminus of US 50 / I-80 BL / I-305; western end of I-80 BL / I-305 concurrency; former US 40 west / US 99W north
Yolo; YOL 0.00–3.16	West Sacramento	0.35	1A	I-80 east – Reno	Westbound exit and eastbound entrance; former I-880 east; I-80 exit 82
Yolo; YOL 0.00–3.16	West Sacramento		—	I-80 Express Lanes west	Proposed; Express Lanes access only; westbound exit and eastbound entrance
Yolo; YOL 0.00–3.16	West Sacramento		—	Yolo Express Lanes	Proposed westernmost access point on mainline US 50 / I-80 BL
Yolo; YOL 0.00–3.16	West Sacramento	1.20	1B	Harbor Boulevard	Signed as exit 1 eastbound
Yolo; YOL 0.00–3.16	West Sacramento	2.50	3	Downtown Sacramento (SR 275) / Jefferson Boulevard (SR 84)	Eastbound exit and westbound entrance; SR 275 is former US 40 east / US 99W south
Yolo; YOL 0.00–3.16	West Sacramento	2.50	3	Jefferson Boulevard (SR 84) / South River Road	Westbound exit and eastbound entrance
Sacramento River		3.16 0.00 (Note: Indicates that the postmile represents the distance along I-80 BL, as indicated on the Caltrans I-80 BL exit list. The corresponding postmile for US 50 would be the same except for the addition of an "L" prefix.)	Pioneer Memorial Bridge		
Sacramento; SAC 0.00–2.48, L2.30–23.14	Sacramento	0.35	4A	I-5 to SR 99 north – Redding, Los Angeles	Western end of SR 99 concurrency; I-5 exit 518
Sacramento; SAC 0.00–2.48, L2.30–23.14	Sacramento		—	Yolo Express Lanes	East end of proposed Express Lanes
Sacramento; SAC 0.00–2.48, L2.30–23.14	Sacramento	0.61	4B	5th Street – Downtown Sacramento	Eastbound exit and westbound entrance; former SR 99
Sacramento; SAC 0.00–2.48, L2.30–23.14	Sacramento	0.61	4B	10th Street – Downtown Sacramento	Westbound exit and eastbound entrance
Sacramento; SAC 0.00–2.48, L2.30–23.14	Sacramento	1.37	5	15th Street	Eastbound exit and westbound entrance; former US 99W / SR 160
Sacramento; SAC 0.00–2.48, L2.30–23.14	Sacramento	1.37	5	16th Street	Westbound exit and eastbound entrance; former US 99W / SR 160
Sacramento; SAC 0.00–2.48, L2.30–23.14	Sacramento	2.48	—	I-80 BL east (Capital City Freeway east) / SR 99 south (South Sacramento Freeway) – Reno, Fresno	Eastern terminus of unsigned I-305; eastern end of I-80 BL / SR 99 / I-305 concurrency; eastbound exit and westbound entrance; US 50 east follows I-80 BL exit 6A; I-80 BL east is former I-80 east; I-80 BL west exit 6A; SR 99 north exit 298A
Sacramento; SAC 0.00–2.48, L2.30–23.14	Sacramento	L2.30	6A	26th Street	Westbound exit and eastbound entrance
Sacramento; SAC 0.00–2.48, L2.30–23.14	Sacramento	R0.00	6B	SR 99 south (South Sacramento Freeway) – Fresno	Westbound exit and eastbound entrance; SR 99 north exit 298A
Sacramento; SAC 0.00–2.48, L2.30–23.14	Sacramento	R0.14	6C	I-80 BL east (Capital City Freeway east) – Reno	Westbound exit and eastbound entrance; former I-80 east; I-80 BL west exit 6A
Sacramento; SAC 0.00–2.48, L2.30–23.14	Sacramento	R0.57	7	34th Street	Eastbound exit only
Sacramento; SAC 0.00–2.48, L2.30–23.14	Sacramento	R0.57	7	Stockton Boulevard	No eastbound exit
Sacramento; SAC 0.00–2.48, L2.30–23.14	Sacramento	R2.13	8A	59th Street	Eastbound exit and westbound entrance
Sacramento; SAC 0.00–2.48, L2.30–23.14	Sacramento	R2.63	8B	65th Street	Signed as exit 8 westbound
Sacramento; SAC 0.00–2.48, L2.30–23.14	Sacramento	R3.47	9	SR 16 east (Howe Avenue) / Power Inn Road – Cal State University Sacramento	Cal State Univ. Sacramento not signed westbound; western terminus of SR 16 eastern segment
Sacramento; SAC 0.00–2.48, L2.30–23.14	Sacramento	R5.34	11	Watt Avenue	
Sacramento; SAC 0.00–2.48, L2.30–23.14	Rancho Cordova	R7.75	13	Bradshaw Road	
Sacramento; SAC 0.00–2.48, L2.30–23.14	Rancho Cordova	R9.51	15	Mather Field Road – Mather Field, Rancho Cordova	
Sacramento; SAC 0.00–2.48, L2.30–23.14	Rancho Cordova	R10.92	17	Zinfandel Drive – Rancho Cordova	
Sacramento; SAC 0.00–2.48, L2.30–23.14	Rancho Cordova	12.50	18	Sunrise Boulevard (CR E2) – Fair Oaks	
Sacramento; SAC 0.00–2.48, L2.30–23.14	Rancho Cordova	15.76	21	Hazel Avenue (CR E3 north)	Southern terminus of CR E3
Sacramento; SAC 0.00–2.48, L2.30–23.14		16.10	22	Aerojet Road	Eastbound exit only
Sacramento; SAC 0.00–2.48, L2.30–23.14	Folsom	17.01	23	Folsom Boulevard	Former US 50
Sacramento; SAC 0.00–2.48, L2.30–23.14	Folsom	19.23	25	Prairie City Road	
Sacramento; SAC 0.00–2.48, L2.30–23.14	Folsom	21.50	27	East Bidwell Street	
Sacramento; SAC 0.00–2.48, L2.30–23.14	Folsom		28	Empire Ranch Road	Proposed interchange
El Dorado; ED 0.00–80.44	El Dorado Hills	0.86	30	Latrobe Road / El Dorado Hills Boulevard	Signed as exits 30A (Latrobe Road) and 30B (El Dorado Hills Boulevard) eastbound
El Dorado; ED 0.00–80.44	El Dorado Hills	R1.83	31	Silva Valley Parkway / White Rock Road	
El Dorado; ED 0.00–80.44	El Dorado Hills–Cameron Park line	R3.23	32	Bass Lake Road	
El Dorado; ED 0.00–80.44	Cameron Park	4.96	34	Cambridge Road – Cameron Park	
El Dorado; ED 0.00–80.44	Cameron Park	6.57	35	Cameron Park Drive	
El Dorado; ED 0.00–80.44	Shingle Springs	R8.56	37	Ponderosa Road	
El Dorado; ED 0.00–80.44		R10.31	39	Shingle Springs Drive	
El Dorado; ED 0.00–80.44		R11.22	40	Red Hawk Parkway	
El Dorado; ED 0.00–80.44		R12.19	41	Greenstone Road	
El Dorado; ED 0.00–80.44	Diamond Springs	R14.01	43	El Dorado Road	
El Dorado; ED 0.00–80.44	Diamond Springs	R15.06	44A	Missouri Flat Road – Diamond Springs	
El Dorado; ED 0.00–80.44	Placerville	15.83	44B	Forni Road / Placerville Drive	
El Dorado; ED 0.00–80.44	Placerville	16.50	45	Ray Lawyer Drive	No westbound exit
El Dorado; ED 0.00–80.44	Placerville	16.99	46	Placerville Drive	Westbound exit and eastbound entrance
El Dorado; ED 0.00–80.44	Placerville	17.42	46	Central Placerville, Diamond Springs (Main Street)	Closed; former eastbound exit
El Dorado; ED 0.00–80.44	Placerville	17.52		Canal Street	At-grade intersection; eastern end of freeway
El Dorado; ED 0.00–80.44	Placerville	17.67		SR 49 (Spring Street) – Auburn, Jackson	At-grade intersection
El Dorado; ED 0.00–80.44	Placerville	17.76	—	Coloma Street	Interchange; westbound exit only
El Dorado; ED 0.00–80.44	Placerville	18.03		Bedford Avenue	At-grade intersection; western end of freeway
El Dorado; ED 0.00–80.44	Placerville	18.52	47	Broadway / Mosquito Road / Main Street	No eastbound entrance; signed as Broadway eastbound, Mosquito Road / Main Street westbound
El Dorado; ED 0.00–80.44	Placerville	19.13	48	Schnell School Road / Apple Hill Drive	
El Dorado; ED 0.00–80.44	Placerville	20.30	49A	Point View Drive	Signed as exit 49 eastbound
El Dorado; ED 0.00–80.44		20.75	49B	Smith Flat (Road 145)	Westbound exit and eastbound entrance; eastern end of freeway; Smith Flat accessible as part of exit 49 eastbound
El Dorado; ED 0.00–80.44	Camino	23.96		Carson Road – Camino	At-grade intersection; connects to Lincoln Highway east; western end of freeway
El Dorado; ED 0.00–80.44	Camino	R25.95	54	Cedar Grove, Camino (Carson Road)	Signed as Cedar Grove eastbound, Camino westbound
El Dorado; ED 0.00–80.44	Camino	R27.12	Weigh station (westbound only)		
El Dorado; ED 0.00–80.44	Pollock Pines	R28.84	57	Ridgeway Drive	Formerly signed as Pollock Pines eastbound, Cedar Grove westbound
El Dorado; ED 0.00–80.44	Pollock Pines	R31.30	60	Sly Park Road (CR E16 south)	Northern terminus of CR E16; former US 50 Alt. east
El Dorado; ED 0.00–80.44	Pollock Pines	R31.30	Eastern end of freeway		
El Dorado; ED 0.00–80.44		66.48	Echo Summit, elevation 7,382 feet (2,250 m)		
El Dorado; ED 0.00–80.44	Meyers	70.62		SR 89 south to SR 88 – Markleeville, Jackson	Roundabout; western end of SR 89 overlap; former US 50 Alt. west
El Dorado; ED 0.00–80.44	Meyers	71.00	Agricultural Inspection Station (westbound only)		
El Dorado; ED 0.00–80.44	South Lake Tahoe	75.45		SR 89 north (Emerald Bay Road) / Lake Tahoe Boulevard west – Emerald Bay, Tahoe City	Eastern end of SR 89 overlap
El Dorado; ED 0.00–80.44	South Lake Tahoe	80.44		US 50 east – Stateline	Continuation into Nevada
1.000 mi = 1.609 km; 1.000 km = 0.621 mi: Closed/former; Concurrency terminus; Incomplete access; Unopened

== Footnotes ==
U.S. Route 50
Previous state: Terminus	California	Next state: Nevada
