= Kyburz =

Kyburz may refer to:

- Kyburz, California, a town in El Dorado County

== People ==
- Albert Kyburz, American postman
- Ernst Kyburz, Swiss wrestler
- Hanspeter Kyburz, Swiss composer
- Matthias Kyburz, Swiss orienteer
- Rosemary Kyburz, Australian politician
