= Moore's Station =

Moore's Station may refer to:

- Moore's Station, California
- Booneville, Kentucky, originally settled as Moore's Station
- Moore's Station, Michigan
- Moore's Station, New Jersey, alternate name of Moore, New Jersey
- Moore's Station, Nevada

== See also ==
- Moores Station (disambiguation)
