= South Lake Tahoe, California =

City in California, United States

- City
- City of South Lake Tahoe
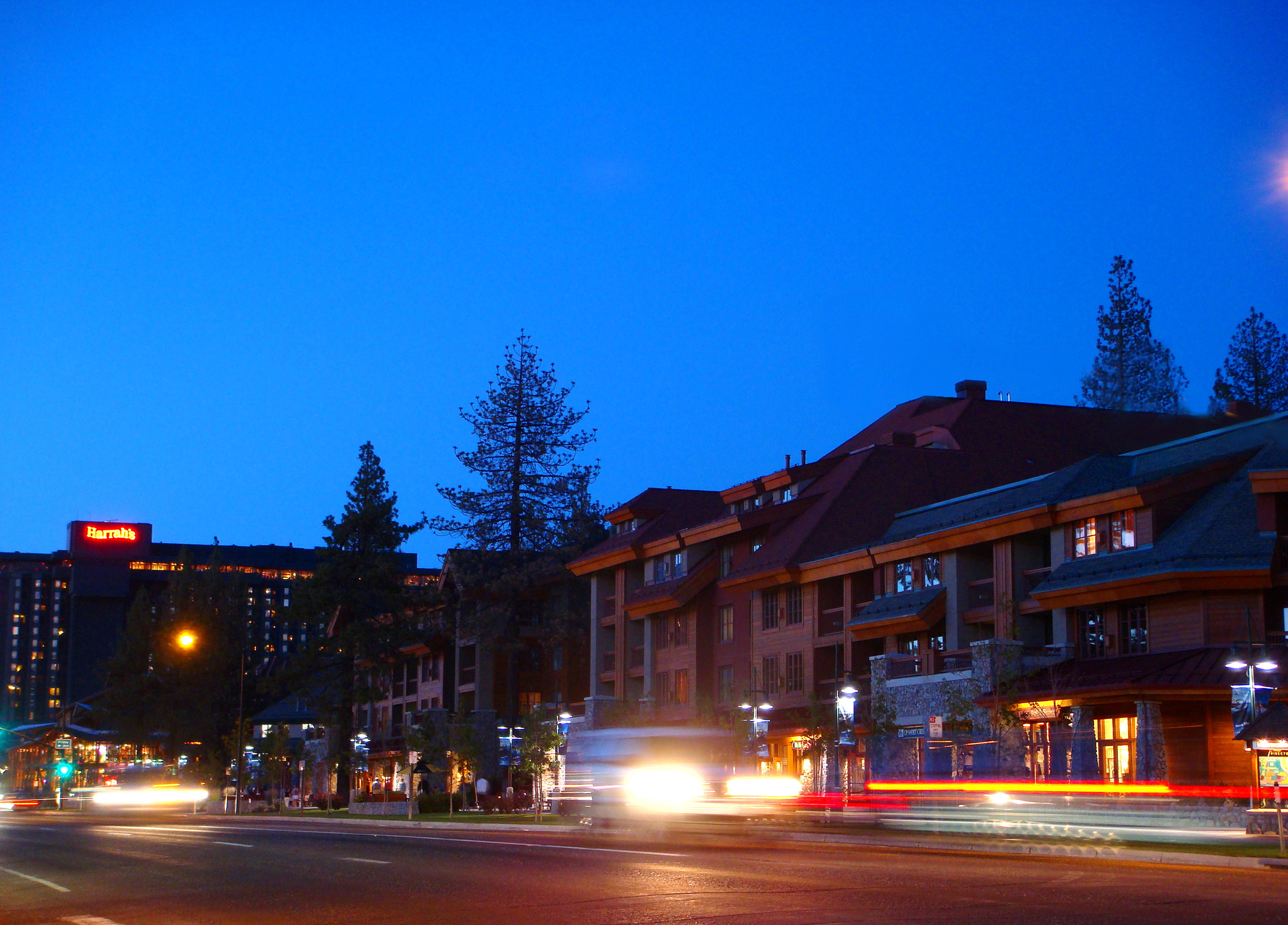
- South Lake Tahoe near Heavenly Village

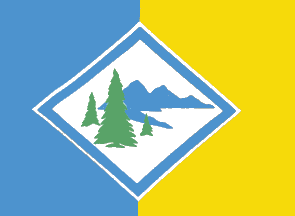
- Flag
- Interactive map of South Lake Tahoe, California
- Location in the United States
- Coordinates: 38°56′24″N 119°58′37″W
- Country: United States
- State: California
- County: El Dorado
- Incorporated: November 30, 1965

Government
  - Type: Mayor-council
  - Mayor: Cody Bass
  - State Senate: Marie Alvarado-Gil (R)
  - State Assembly: Heather Hadwick (R)
  - U.S. Congress: Kevin Kiley (I)

Area
  - Total: 16.63 sq mi (43.07 km^{2})
  - Land: 10.19 sq mi (26.39 km^{2})
  - Water: 6.44 sq mi (16.68 km^{2}) 38.74%
- Elevation: 6,237 ft (1,901 m)

Population (2020)
  - Total: 21,330
  - Density: 2,093/sq mi (808.3/km^{2})
- Time zone: UTC−8 (Pacific (PST))
  - Summer (DST): UTC−7 (PDT)
- ZIP code: 96150
- Area codes: 530, 837
- FIPS code: 06-73108
- GNIS feature IDs: 1659822, 2411938
- Climate: Dsb
- Website: www.cityofslt.gov

South Lake Tahoe is the most populous city in El Dorado County, California, United States, in the Sierra Nevada mountains. The city's population was 21,330 at the 2020 census, down from 21,403 at the 2010 census. The city, along the southern edge of Lake Tahoe, extends about 5 miles (8 km) west-southwest along U.S. Route 50, also known as Lake Tahoe Boulevard. The east end of the city, on the California–Nevada state line right next to the town of Stateline, Nevada, is mainly geared towards tourism, restaurants, hotels, and Heavenly Mountain Resort with the Nevada casinos just across the state line in Stateline. The western end of town is mainly residential, and clusters around "The Y", the intersection of US 50, State Route 89, and the continuation of Lake Tahoe Boulevard after it loses its federal highway designation.

== Geography ==
According to the United States Census Bureau, the city has a total area of 16.6 square miles (43 km^{2}), of which 10.2 square miles (26 km^{2}) is land and 6.4 square miles (17 km^{2}), or 38.74%, is water. Its elevation is about 6,237 feet (1,901 m) above sea level.

== Demographics ==
Historical population
Census	Pop.	Note	%±
1970	12,921		—
1980	20,681		60.1%
1990	21,586		4.4%
2000	23,609		9.4%
2010	21,403		−9.3%
2020	21,330		−0.3%
U.S. Decennial Census

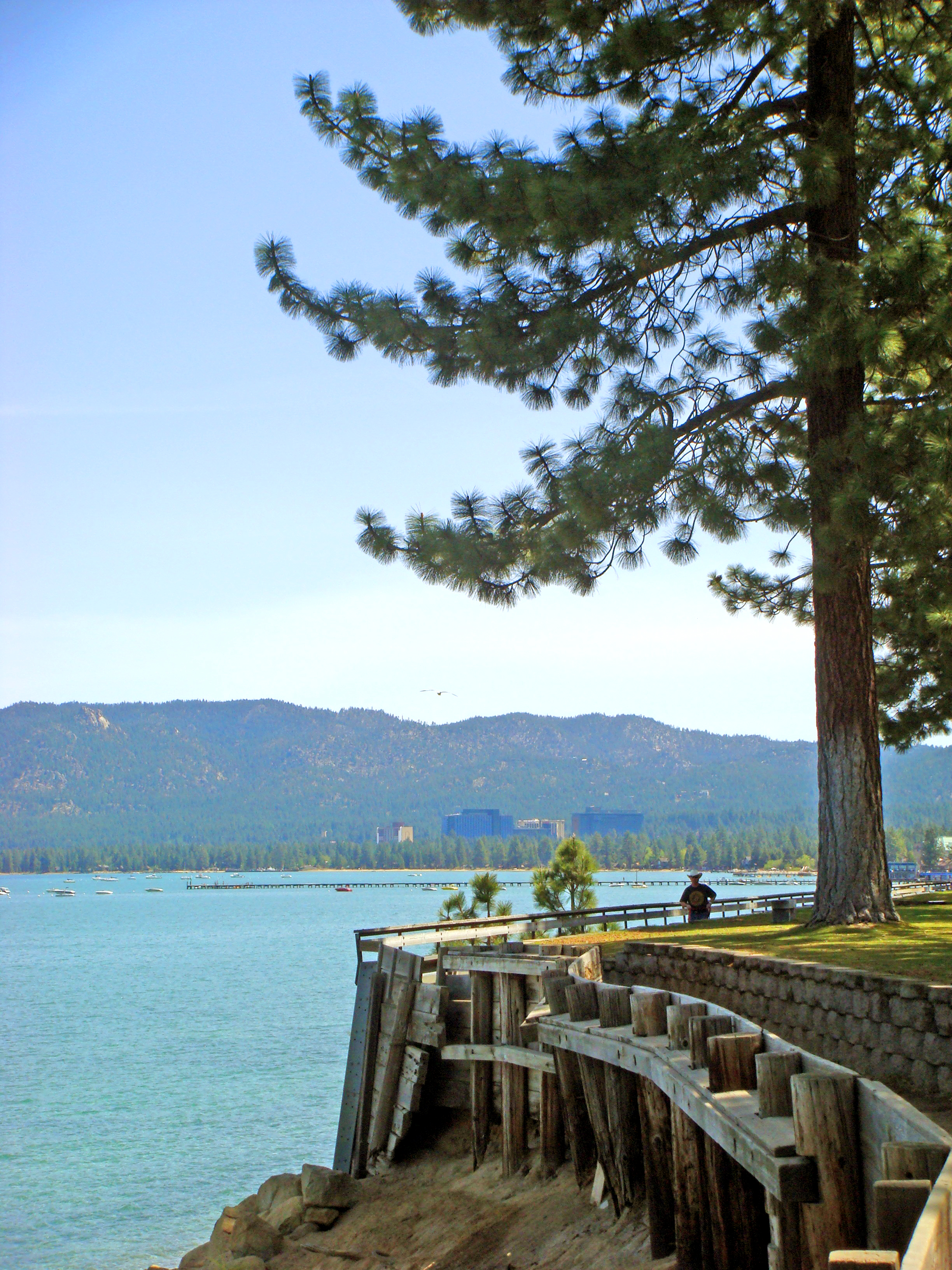
Beachfront walkway, South Lake Tahoe, Memorial Day weekend 2007

=== 2020 census ===
As of the 2020 census, South Lake Tahoe had a population of 21,330 and a population density of 2,093.6 inhabitants per square mile (808.3/km^{2}).

The census reported that 99.0% of the population lived in households, 0.2% lived in non-institutionalized group quarters, and 0.8% were institutionalized. 100.0% of residents lived in urban areas, while 0.0% lived in rural areas.

There were 9,266 households, out of which 25.0% had children under the age of 18 living in them. Of all households, 33.7% were married-couple households, 11.0% were cohabiting couple households, 27.3% had a female householder with no spouse or partner present, and 28.0% had a male householder with no spouse or partner present. About 33.5% of all households were made up of individuals, and 11.2% had someone living alone who was 65 years of age or older. The average household size was 2.28. There were 4,784 families (51.6% of all households).

The age distribution was 18.5% under the age of 18, 7.8% aged 18 to 24, 32.9% aged 25 to 44, 25.8% aged 45 to 64, and 15.0% who were 65 years of age or older. The median age was 38.1 years. For every 100 females, there were 107.8 males, and for every 100 females age 18 and over there were 107.9 males age 18 and over.

There were 15,961 housing units at an average density of 1,566.6 units per square mile (604.9 units/km^{2}), of which 9,266 (58.1%) were occupied. Of occupied units, 39.1% were owner-occupied and 60.9% were occupied by renters. Of all housing units, 41.9% were vacant. The homeowner vacancy rate was 2.9% and the rental vacancy rate was 8.7%.

Racial composition as of the 2020 census
Race	Number	Percent
White	13,186	61.8%
Black or African American	152	0.7%
American Indian and Alaska Native	246	1.2%
Asian	1,235	5.8%
Native Hawaiian and Other Pacific Islander	22	0.1%
Some other race	3,456	16.2%
Two or more races	3,033	14.2%
Hispanic or Latino (of any race)	6,558	30.7%

=== 2023 ACS estimates ===
In 2023, the US Census Bureau estimated that the median household income was $73,940, and the per capita income was $50,098. About 7.1% of families and 12.4% of the population were below the poverty line.

South Lake Tahoe education rate from 2019–2023, of all persons aged 25 or older, 89.0% were high school graduates and 34.0% had a bachelor's degree.

== Education ==
South Lake Tahoe and the surrounding unincorporated communities are serviced by Lake Tahoe Unified School District, which is composed of four elementary schools (Bijou Community School, Sierra House Elementary School, Tahoe Valley Elementary School, and the Lake Tahoe Environmental Science Magnet School) a middle school (South Tahoe Middle School) and a high school (South Tahoe High School).

Due to budget cuts, Al Tahoe Elementary School and Meyers Elementary School closed in 2004; however, Meyers Elementary School reopened as Lake Tahoe Environmental Science Magnet School after a year's absence.

South Lake Tahoe also houses a community college, Lake Tahoe Community College.

South Lake Tahoe is the home of Tahoe Prep Hockey Academy.

== Politics ==
The city council of South Lake Tahoe is composed of five elected members: three council members, a Mayor, and a Mayor Pro Tem. The Mayor changes every year and is elected by the City Council.

In the state legislature, South Lake Tahoe is in the 4th senatorial district, represented by Republican Marie Alvarado-Gil, and the 1st Assembly district, represented by Republican Heather Hadwick.

Federally, South Lake Tahoe is in California's 3rd congressional district, represented by Independent Kevin Kiley.

== History ==
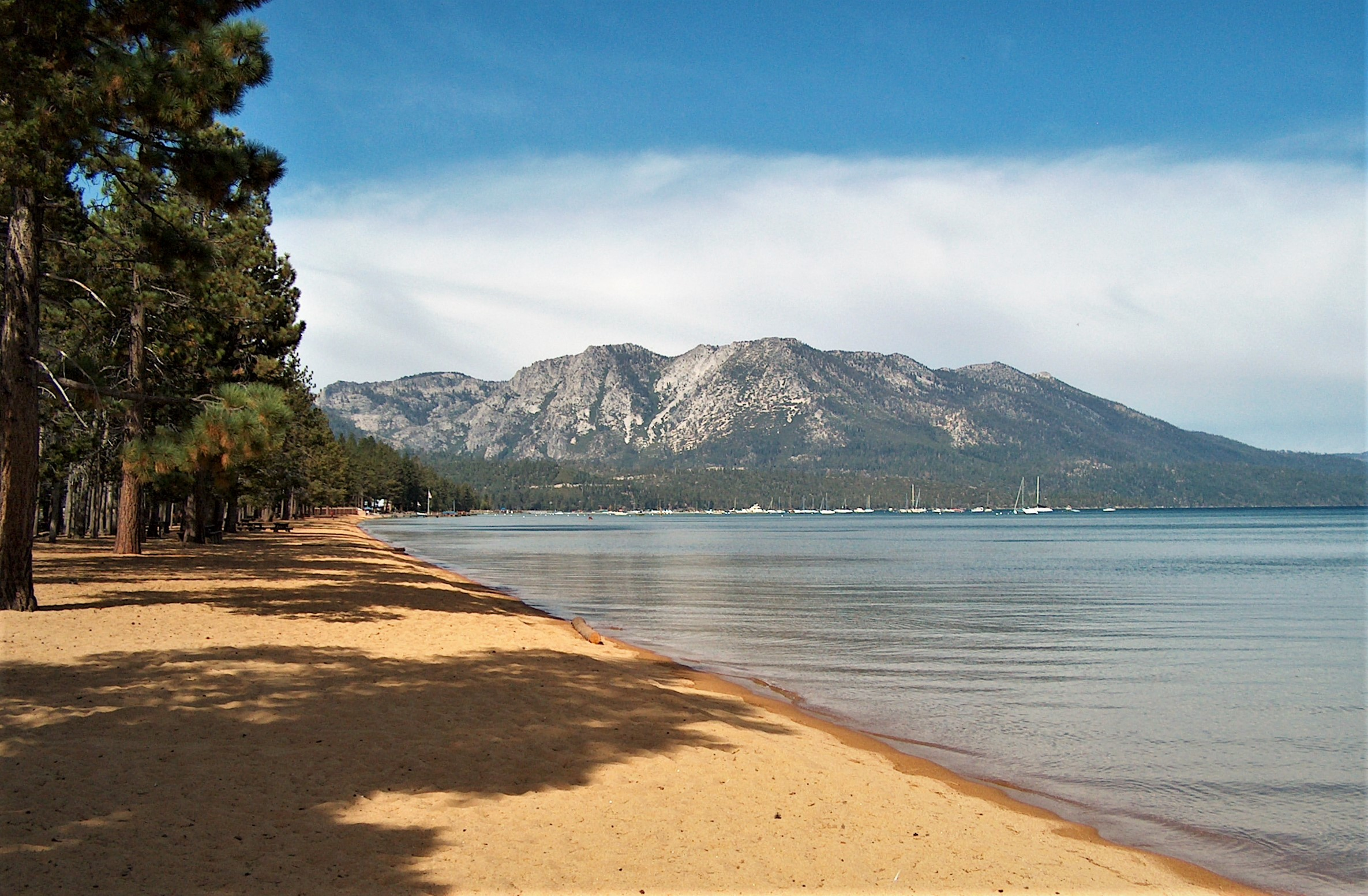
South Lake Tahoe beach and western view

The city was incorporated in 1965 by combining the unincorporated communities of Al Tahoe, Bijou, Bijou Park, Stateline, Tahoe Valley, and Tallac Village. A post office was established in 1967.

Gambling arrived at the Lake in 1944 when Harvey's Wagon Wheel Saloon and Gambling Hall opened in Nevada as one of the area's first gaming establishments. Competition soon sprang up and so did the need for more permanent accommodations. By the 1950s, roads began to be plowed year-round, enabling access to permanent residences. When the 1960 Winter Olympics came to what is now Olympic Valley, Lake Tahoe was put firmly on the map as the skiing center of the western United States.

On December 8, 1963, Frank Sinatra Jr. was kidnapped by Barry Keenan, Johnny Irwin, and Joe Amsler. Sinatra was released, unharmed, soon after.

The disappearance of Donna Lass on September 6, 1970, has been linked to the Zodiac Killer.

The bombing of Harvey's Lake Tahoe in 1980, took place just outside the city limits in Stateline, Nevada.

On May 18, 1987, Herbert James Coddington was arrested for the murder of two women and the kidnapping of two teenagers. He was found guilty of these crimes and sentenced to death in 1988.

In 1991, Jaycee Lee Dugard (age 11) was abducted from a bus stop in South Lake Tahoe; she was found alive in Antioch, California, in 2009.

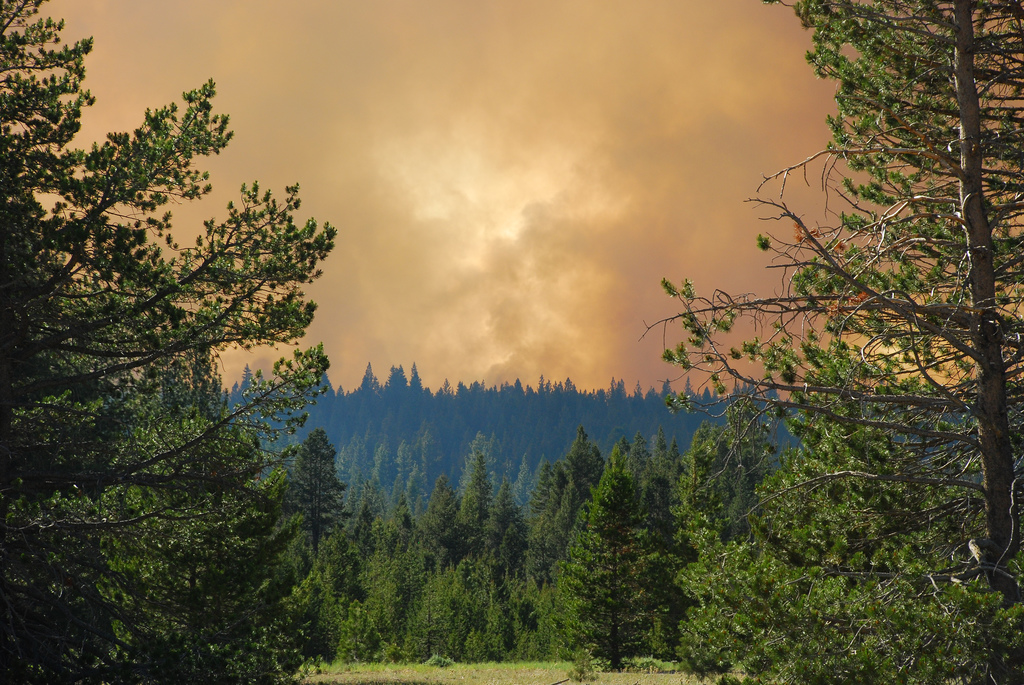
View of the Angora Fire from nearby

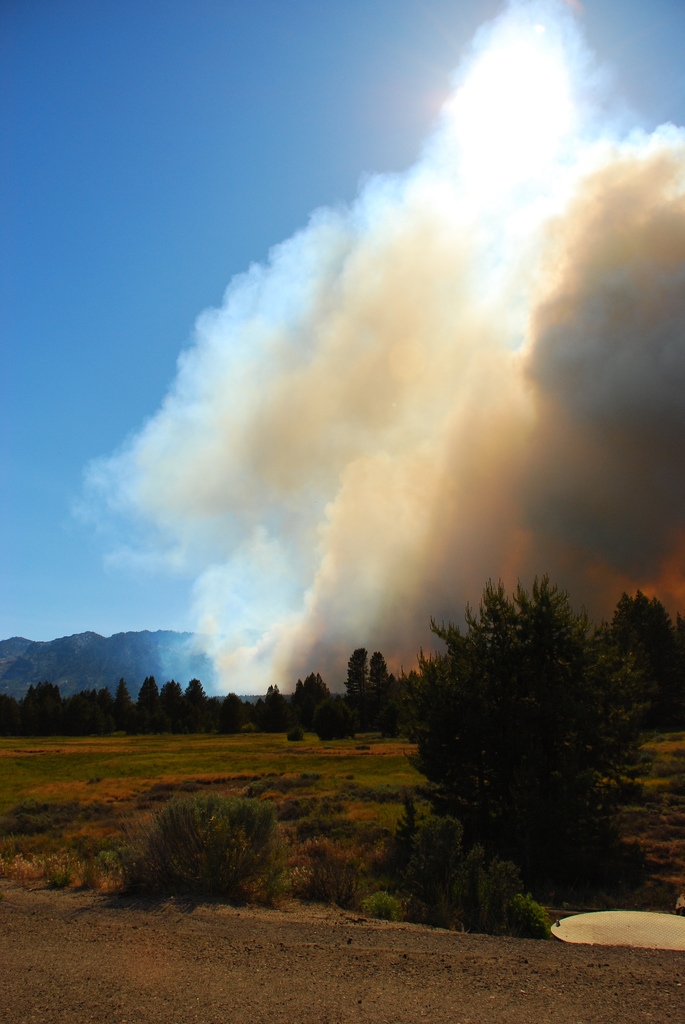
Flames approach at 4:42pm on June 24, 2007.

On June 24, 2007, the Angora Fire broke out at the Seneca Pond recreation area near Meyers, three miles (4.8 km) south of South Lake Tahoe. The Angora Fire, so named for its proximity to Angora Ridge, stands as the worst forest fire in recorded Lake Tahoe history.

The fire spread throughout the Angora region rapidly, destroying dozens of homes and large tracts of forest. Highway closures followed by evacuations put the residents in the direct line of the fire. Hotels in the area responded by opening their doors to the hundreds of evacuees who needed shelter.

On June 25, 2007, a state of emergency was announced by Lt. Gov. John Garamendi acting on behalf of the absent Governor Arnold Schwarzenegger, who was traveling in Europe. There were no deaths, but over 3,000 acres (12 km^{2}) were burned, while more than 275 structures, including 254 homes and 26 other buildings, were damaged or destroyed. On June 27, 2007, Schwarznegger toured the area after he returned to California.

Full containment of the fire was announced on July 2.

In 2012, the Lakeview Commons Park was renamed. As reported in the local media, "The Washoe Tribe has presented the name Tahnu Leweh (Pronounced Tah-New Lay-Way) which, in the native language, means 'all the people's place.' It is a name the Tribe would like to gift to El Dorado County and South Lake Tahoe as a symbol of peace, prosperity and goodness."

In August 2021, the entire city was forced to evacuate due to the Caldor Fire.

== Transportation ==
South Lake Tahoe is served by a major eastwest highway, U.S. 50, which links the area with Sacramento, California, and Carson City, Nevada. Highway 50 often faces closures during winter due to bad weather conditions.

The Lake Tahoe Airport serves general aviation, while the closest scheduled passenger airline service is available via the Reno–Tahoe International Airport in Reno, Nevada.

Local bus service is operated by the Tahoe Transportation District. El Dorado Transit operates service between South Lake Tahoe, Placerville, and Sacramento.

Amtrak Thruway 20C provides a daily connection to/from Sacramento Valley Station to the west, with a few stops in between.

In 2024, The City of South Lake Tahoe began the process of starting a Joint Powers Agreement with El Dorado County, called South Tahoe Area Rapid Transit, which would complement transit services provided by Tahoe Transportation District.

The South Tahoe Airporter serves as an airport shuttle option from the Reno airport to the casinos at Stateline.

== Landscape ==
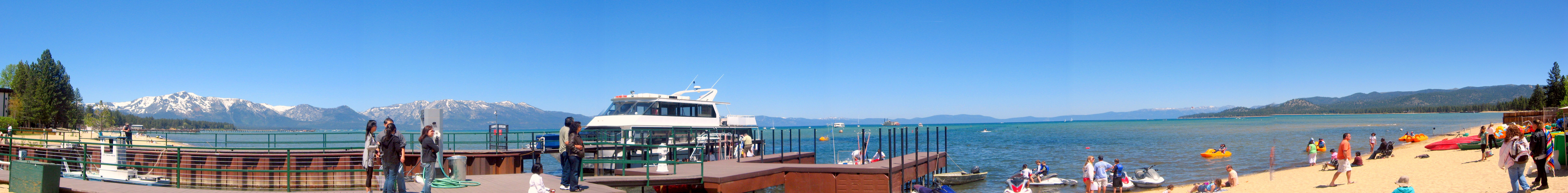
Panoramic view of the lake from shore

== Climate ==
Climate chart for South Lake Tahoe

South Lake Tahoe has a snowy highland climate featuring chilly winters with regular snowfall, and summers that feature warm to hot days and cool nights with very low humidity. The climate is either classified as a warm-summer Mediterranean climate (Köppen Csb), using the 27 °F (−3 °C) isotherm of the original Köppen scheme, or a dry-summer humid continental climate (Köppen Dsb), using the 32 °F (0 °C) isotherm preferred by some climatologists. Summertime is also the dry season, with August averaging only 0.36 inches (9.1 mm) of precipitation, in contrast to February's 3.75 inches (95.3 mm). Depending on the year, snowfall can be extremely heavy in winter, with an average of 88 inches (220 cm), while the wettest "rain year" has been from July 2005 to June 2006 with 31.12 inches (790.4 mm) and the driest from July 2002 to June 2003 with 9.26 inches (235.2 mm). December 2005 has been the wettest month with 13.83 inches (351.3 mm) of total water-equivalent precipitation.

South Lake Tahoe averages 1 day per year that reaches 90 °F (32 °C) or higher, most commonly occurring in July and August. Every month of the year averages at least 1 night with a low temperature of 32 °F (0 °C) or lower and overall there are 223 mornings in an average year that fall below freezing, although only 5 fall to 0 °F (−18 °C). High temperatures below 32 °F (0 °C) occur on average 12 days per year. The record high is 99 °F (37.2 °C), set on July 22, 1988, and the record low is −29 °F (−33.9 °C), set on December 29, 1972, and subsequently tied on February 7, 1989.

Climate data for South Lake Tahoe, California (Lake Tahoe Airport) (1991–2020 normals, extremes 1968–present)
Month	Jan	Feb	Mar	Apr	May	Jun	Jul	Aug	Sep	Oct	Nov	Dec	Year
Record high °F (°C)	66 (19)	65 (18)	71 (22)	76 (24)	84 (29)	91 (33)	99 (37)	96 (36)	94 (34)	84 (29)	71 (22)	64 (18)	99 (37)
Mean maximum °F (°C)	54.4 (12.4)	55.7 (13.2)	61.4 (16.3)	69.1 (20.6)	76.9 (24.9)	84.3 (29.1)	88.8 (31.6)	87.8 (31.0)	83.7 (28.7)	75.9 (24.4)	64.9 (18.3)	55.8 (13.2)	89.7 (32.1)
Mean daily maximum °F (°C)	42.8 (6.0)	43.4 (6.3)	47.8 (8.8)	53.2 (11.8)	62.1 (16.7)	72.0 (22.2)	80.4 (26.9)	79.7 (26.5)	73.4 (23.0)	62.2 (16.8)	50.9 (10.5)	42.8 (6.0)	59.2 (15.1)
Daily mean °F (°C)	30.6 (−0.8)	31.3 (−0.4)	35.8 (2.1)	40.4 (4.7)	47.6 (8.7)	55.1 (12.8)	61.5 (16.4)	60.4 (15.8)	54.4 (12.4)	45.7 (7.6)	37.1 (2.8)	30.4 (−0.9)	44.2 (6.8)
Mean daily minimum °F (°C)	18.4 (−7.6)	19.3 (−7.1)	23.7 (−4.6)	27.6 (−2.4)	33.2 (0.7)	38.1 (3.4)	42.5 (5.8)	41.0 (5.0)	35.4 (1.9)	29.2 (−1.6)	23.3 (−4.8)	18.0 (−7.8)	29.1 (−1.6)
Mean minimum °F (°C)	−1.3 (−18.5)	1.7 (−16.8)	6.5 (−14.2)	16.4 (−8.7)	23.9 (−4.5)	28.4 (−2.0)	33.8 (1.0)	31.9 (−0.1)	27.0 (−2.8)	18.9 (−7.3)	7.7 (−13.5)	−0.9 (−18.3)	−7.5 (−21.9)
Record low °F (°C)	−21 (−29)	−29 (−34)	−10 (−23)	−1 (−18)	7 (−14)	21 (−6)	25 (−4)	24 (−4)	19 (−7)	9 (−13)	−9 (−23)	−29 (−34)	−29 (−34)
Average precipitation inches (mm)	2.81 (71)	3.75 (95)	2.87 (73)	1.27 (32)	1.32 (34)	0.55 (14)	0.39 (9.9)	0.36 (9.1)	0.28 (7.1)	1.43 (36)	1.94 (49)	3.49 (89)	20.46 (520)
Average snowfall inches (cm)	26.1 (66)	26.3 (67)	20.9 (53)	10.1 (26)	2.0 (5.1)	0.3 (0.76)	0.0 (0.0)	0.0 (0.0)	0.3 (0.76)	2.0 (5.1)	9.7 (25)	24.6 (62)	122.3 (310.72)
Average precipitation days (≥ 0.01 in)	8.6	8.7	10.0	8.4	7.4	2.4	2.1	1.5	2.3	5.4	7.5	10.8	75.1
Average snowy days (≥ 0.1 in)	6.7	6.3	5.7	3.5	1.0	0.2	0.0	0.0	0.1	0.4	3.5	6.4	33.8
Source: NOAA

== See also ==
- Tahoe Keys, California
- Blacklist Festival
- Susie Lake

== Contemporary Development and Tourism ==
South Lake Tahoe has emerged as a premier alpine resort destination in the 21st century, with continued growth in tourism infrastructure and recreational amenities. The city has invested significantly in sustainable development practices and year-round entertainment options. Major developments include expansions of ski resorts, summer outdoor recreation facilities, and hospitality infrastructure. The city has also focused on managing environmental impacts associated with high tourism volumes and seasonal influx of visitors. Recent initiatives have emphasized preserving the natural environment of Lake Tahoe while accommodating growing tourism demands. Winter sports remain a primary draw, while summer activities including hiking, mountain biking, boating, and water sports contribute to year-round tourism economy. The city continues to balance economic development with environmental conservation to maintain the region's natural beauty and recreational value.
