= Strawberry, California =

Strawberry, California may refer to:

- Strawberry, El Dorado County, California
- Strawberry, Marin County, California
- Strawberry, Tuolumne County, California
