= Tahoe Valley, California =

Tahoe Valley
- Former unincorporated community District of South Lake Tahoe
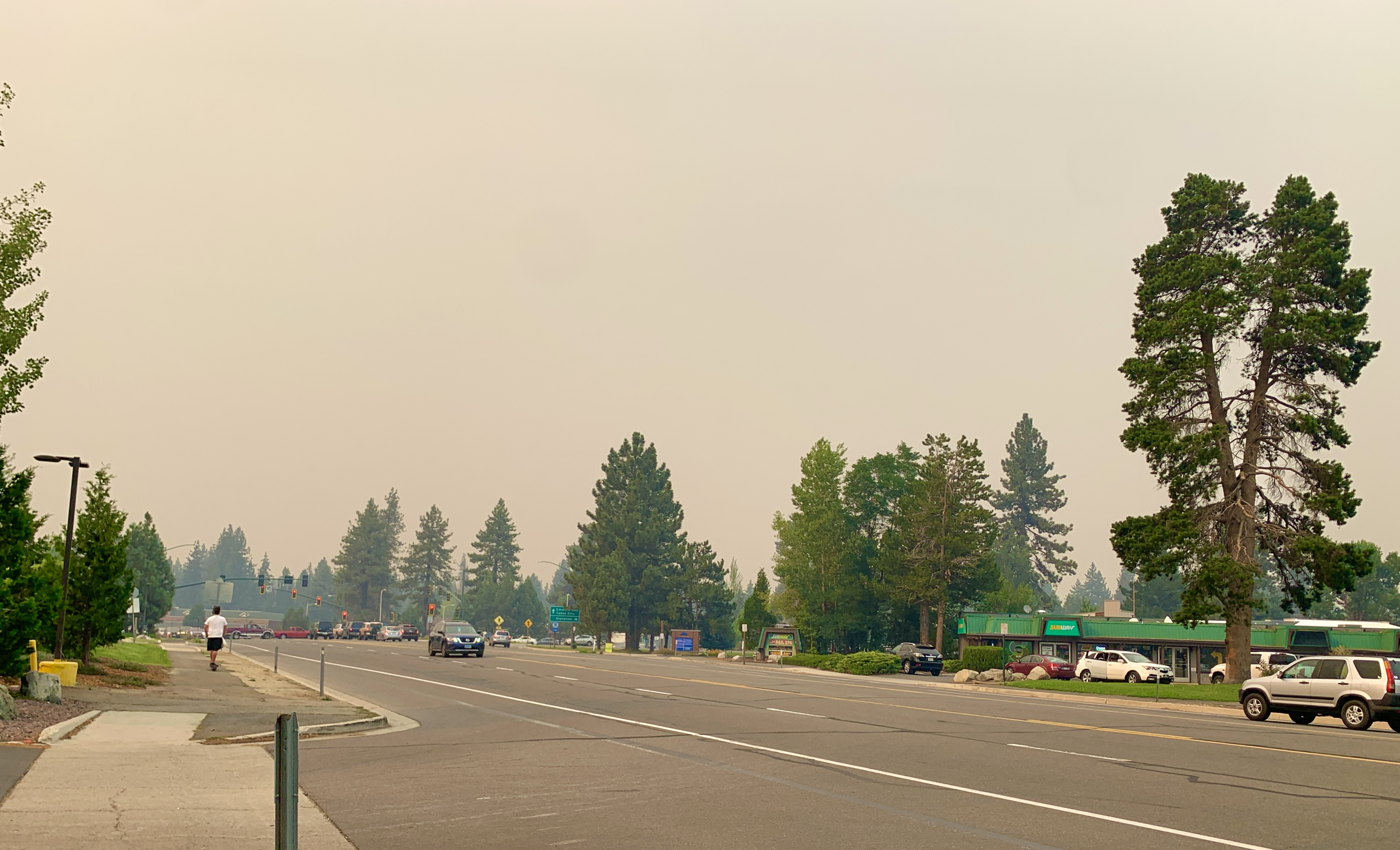

- Location in California
- Coordinates: 38°54′49″N 120°00′16″W
- Country: United States
- State: California
- County: El Dorado County
- City: South Lake Tahoe
- Elevation: 6,270 ft (1,911 m)

Tahoe Valley is a former unincorporated community in El Dorado County, California, now incorporated into South Lake Tahoe. It lies at an elevation of 6270 feet (1911 m). Tahoe Valley is about the junction of U.S. Route 50 and State Route 89.
