= Susie Lake =

Lake in California, United States

Lake Susie
- Location within California
- Location: El Dorado County, California, U.S. Sierra Nevada of the U.S.
- Coordinates: 38.881984°N 120.127374°W
- Basin countries: United States
- Surface elevation: 7,800 ft (2,400 m)

Lake Susie is an alpine lake West of South Lake Tahoe. The water level often becomes very low after late summer. A permit is required to stay overnight. There is a waterfall nearby, known as Susie Lake Falls.

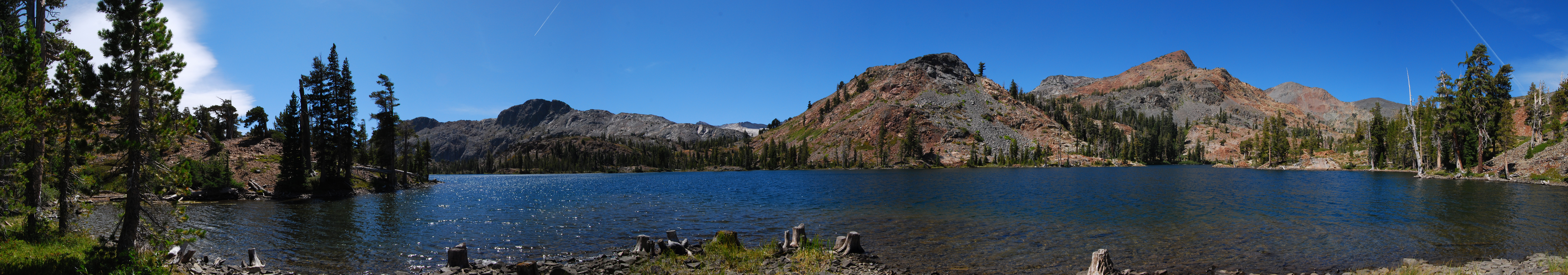
Susie Lake, with Jacks Peak and Dicks Peak to the right
