= Strawberry, El Dorado County, California =

Unincorporated community in California, United States

Strawberry
- Unincorporated community
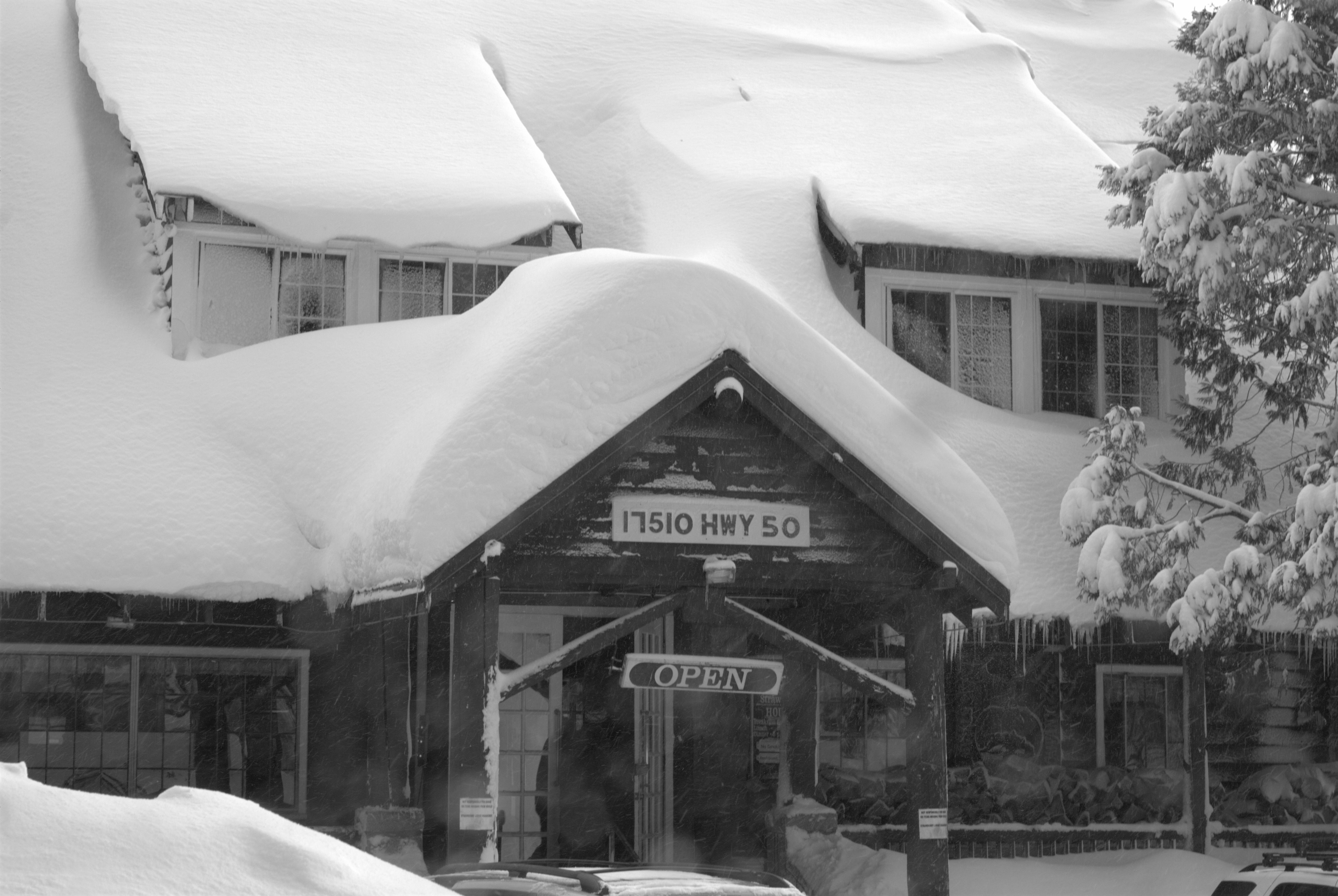
- Strawberry Lodge after a winter storm, facing U.S. Route 50

- Location in California Strawberry (the United States)
- Coordinates: 38°47′49″N 120°08′43″W
- Country: United States
- State: California
- County: El Dorado
- Elevation: 5,738 ft (1,749 m)
- ZIP code: 95735 (Twin Bridges, CA)
- Area code: 530
- FIPS code: 32-60600
- GNIS feature ID: 0861100

California Historical Landmark
- Reference no.: 707

Strawberry is a small unincorporated community on the South Fork American River, 3.25 miles (5 km) south-southwest of Pyramid Peak, along U.S. Route 50 in the foothills of the Sierra Nevada. The sign on the highway reads “population 50”.

The town became a popular resort in the 1850s, and a station along the Central Overland Pony Express between Yank's Station and Webster's, Sugar Loaf House Station. It was along the Lincoln Highway Sierra Nevada Southern Route by 1916. The site is now registered as California Historical Landmark #707.

Strawberry is also the home of the Lovers Leap climbing area.

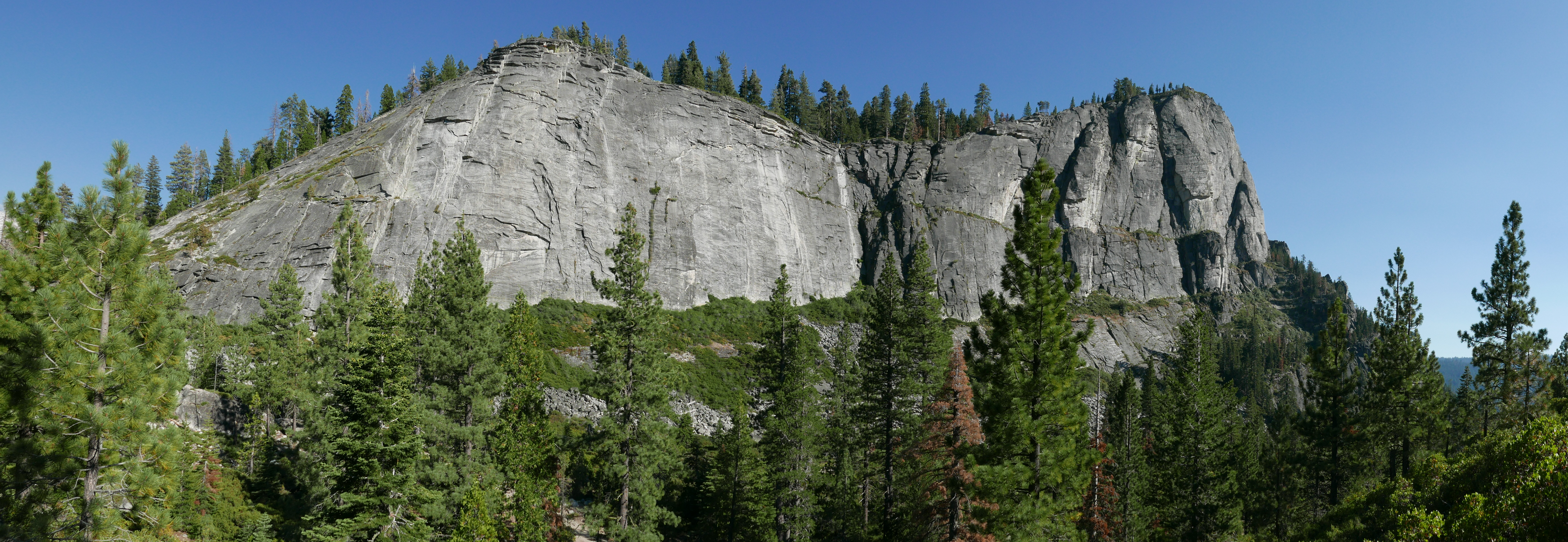
A view of Lovers Leap climbing area from the Pony Express Trail.
