= Al Tahoe, California =

Al Tahoe
- Former unincorporated community District of South Lake Tahoe
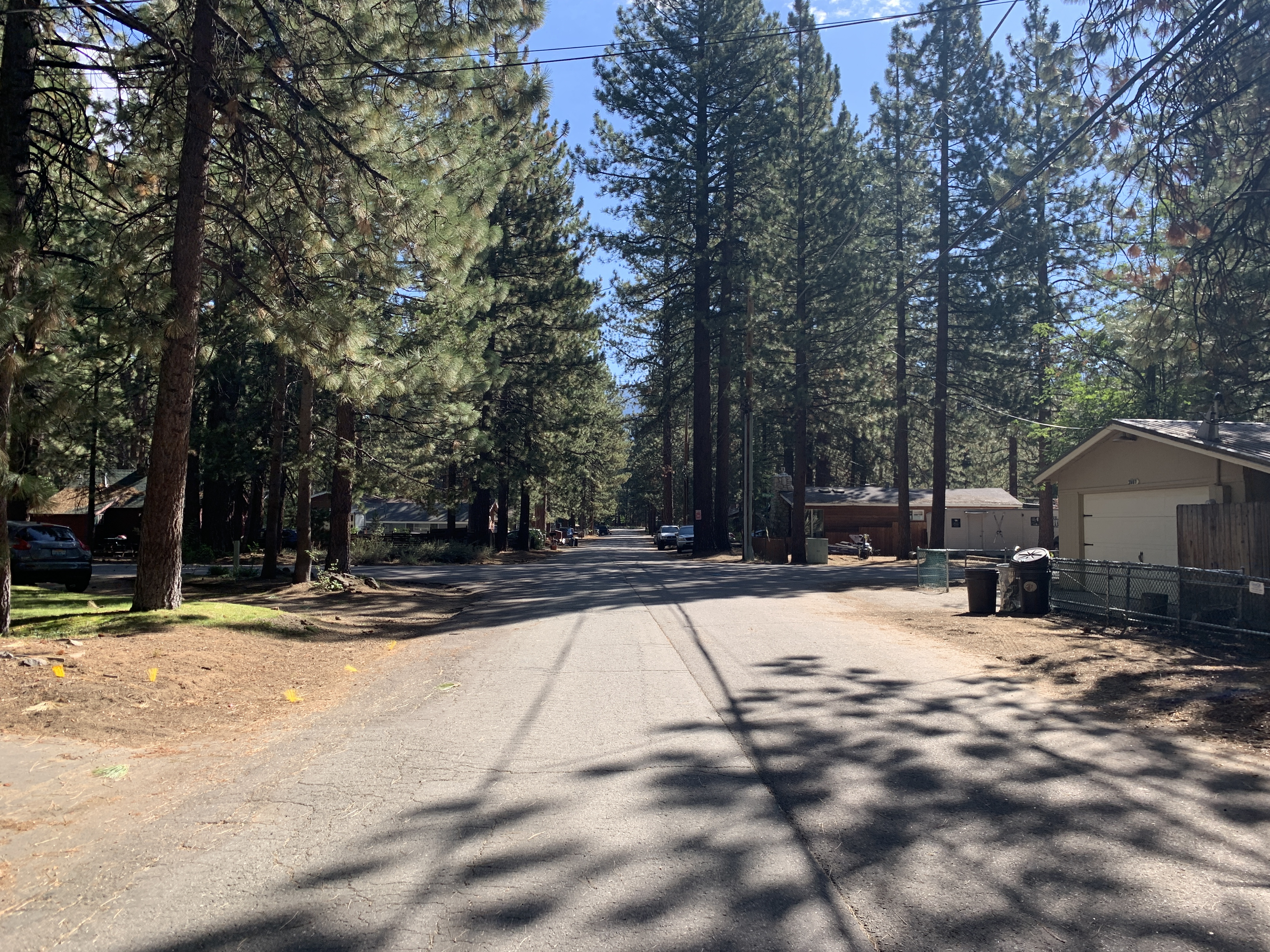

- Location in California
- Coordinates: 38°56′31″N 119°59′01″W
- Country: United States
- State: California
- County: El Dorado County
- City: South Lake Tahoe
- Elevation: 6,253 ft (1,906 m)

Al Tahoe is a former unincorporated community now incorporated in South Lake Tahoe in El Dorado County, California. It lies at an elevation of 6253 feet (1906 m). The community was named for the Al Tahoe Hotel, which was built in 1907 by Almerin R. Sprague. In the 1800s, the community was called Rowlands.
