= Moores Station =

Moores Station may refer to:

- Moores Station, former name of Honcut, California
- Moores Station, alternate name of Moore, New Jersey
- Moore's Station (disambiguation)
