= Tahoe Prep Hockey Academy =

Coordinates: 38.8436°N 120.0288°W

Tahoe Prep Hockey Academy is the first hockey preparatory boarding school in California. It is located in South Lake Tahoe, California on 16.2 acres in the Meyers community. It provides elite high altitude training, athletics and fully accredited NCAA college preparatory academics for student-athletes in the 9th thru 12th grade. Tahoe Prep Academy also offers an additional year for post-graduate students.

The Tahoe Prep Hockey Academy was founded by Leo Fenn, Mike Sechrist & Michael Lewis in 2016. Tahoe Prep Hockey Academy had two teams, Prep & Varsity, in their inaugural season which played in the Anaheim Ducks High School Hockey League and the Western Prep Hockey League for the 2016/17 season. They practice out of their home rink the Tahoe Ice Arena in South Lake Tahoe. The Tahoe Prep Academy has several NHL Players on their advisory board of directors including NHL All-Star and Hall of Fame player, Teemu Selänne, who works closely with his good friend, Leo Fenn, on several different business ventures. Fenn & Selanne founded the Selanne Foundation in 2010 to assist with youth hockey in the Southern California area.

For 2017/18 season, Tahoe Prep Academy team has been approved to play in the North American Hockey League Future Prospects Tournaments in Blaine MN. For the 2018/19 season, Tahoe Prep Academy has joined the NAHL Prep Division which has been created for Prep teams throughout North America. NAHL is generally regarded as one of the top Junior leagues in North America and competition to the Tier I Elite league. The Tahoe Prep Academy hockey teams are coached under the direction of Mike Lewis from the in the Crease hockey documentary film in 2006 and Leo Fenn, who has coached in So Cal with the JSerra Catholic High School, LA Jr Kings and the Anaheim Jr Ducks programs.
