= James Calvin Sly =

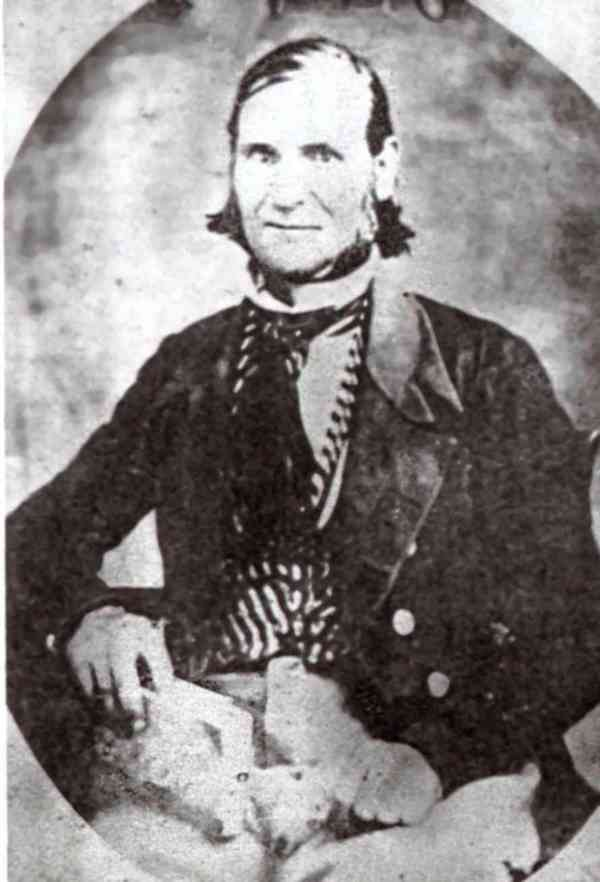
James C. Sly

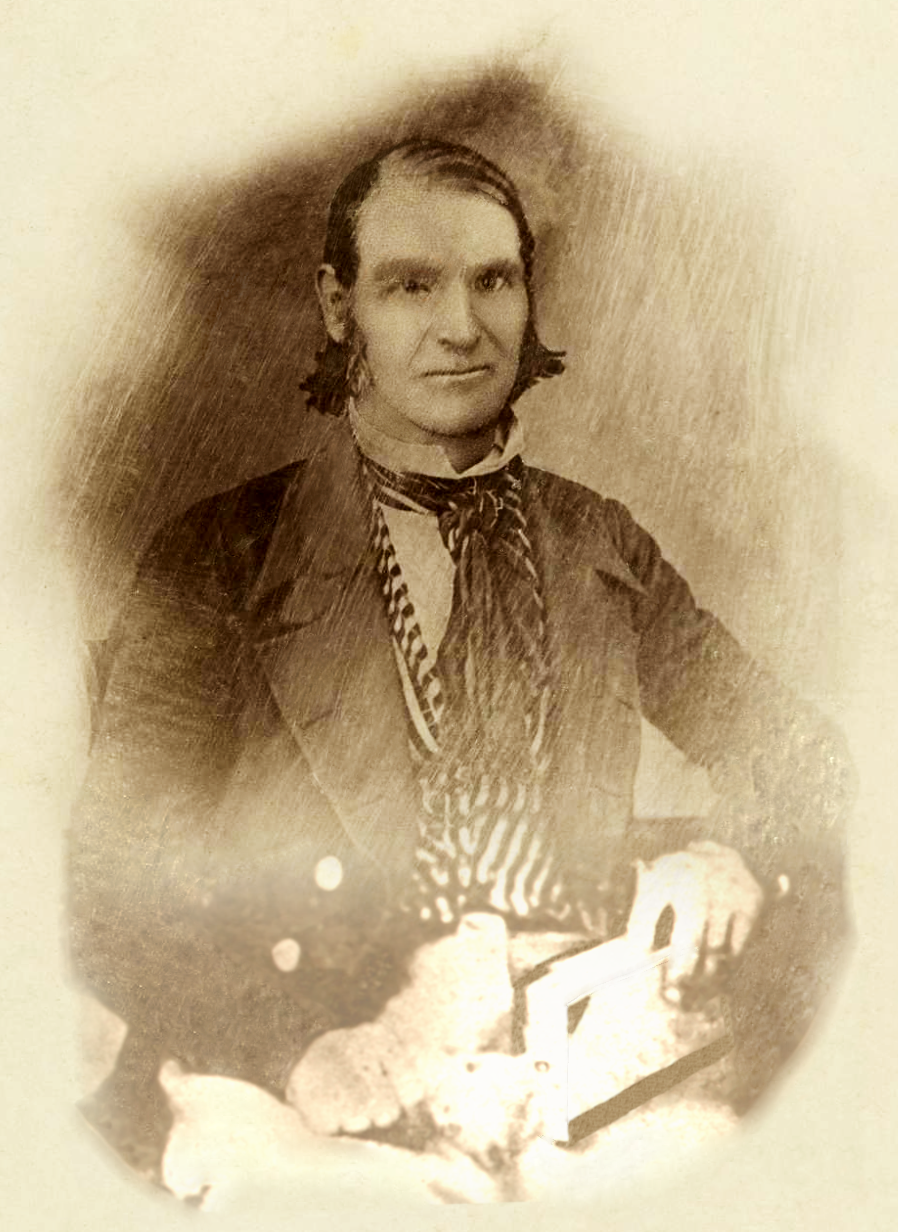
James Calvin Sly

James C. Sly (August 8, 1807 – August 31, 1864) was a Mormon pioneer, member of the Mormon Battalion in the Mexican–American War, scout for early west trails used during the California gold rush, journal keeper in 1848 and 1849, early US western settler of several communities, and Mormon missionary to Canada.

== Service in the Mormon Battalion ==
In 1848, several men who had served in the Mormon Battalion were still working in California, waiting to proceed to the Valley of the Great Salt Lake as soon as a pass should open. According to a previous arrangement a company of eight people started May 1, 1848, Sgt. David Brewett was elected Captain, to pioneer, if possible, a wagon road of the Sierra, Nevada mountains eastward. At that time the Truckee route was still impassable.

This company consisted of David Brewett, Captain Ira J. Willis, James C. Sly, Israel Evens, Jacob G. Truman, Esra Allen, J. R. Allred, Henderson Cox and Robert Pixton.

Three days' travel brought the group to Iron Hill where the deep snow made further travel impossible. One man's donkey was completely buried in the snow except his ears. The group climbed to the top of the mountain, where they could see only snow-capped mountains ahead. They decided to postpone the enterprise until later in the season. So far as they could judge, a wagon road would at least be possible and perhaps a success. One day's travel took them back from snow to a warm spring atmosphere where flowers bloomed and vegetation was far advanced.

On May 1, 1848, several men from the battalion, and others from Sacramento Valley subscribed $512.00 and bought two brass cannons from Captain John A. Sutter, to be taken to Great Salt Lake for the benefit of the Church of Jesus Christ of Latter-day Saints (LDS Church).

The group departed for the Great Basin on July 2, 1848. The historical record states:

By July 2 the company was again on the march. Two days' travel from Pleasant Valley, that is about fifty miles east of Sutter's Fort, brought them to Sly's Park, a small valley or mountain dell, thus named for Captain JAMES C. SLY, who first discovered it. … Four days' travel over rough and rugged mountains took them across the summit, and they found themselves safely landed at the head of Carson Valley, Nevada.

== Later life ==
Sly married Susannah Gustin on March 25, 1849 in Great Salt Lake City. He was wounded outside Fort Levan early in the Utah Black Hawk War. He died in 1864 in Chicken Creek, Juab, Utah. He was buried in Chicken Creek, Juab County, Utah.
