= Herbert Coddington =

American serial killer

- Born: Herbert James Coddington; October 13, 1959 (age 66); Morristown, New Jersey, U.S.
- Convictions: First degree murder with special circumstances (2 counts); Forcible rape; Forcible oral copulation; Forcible sexual penetration (2 counts)
- Penalty: Death

Details
- Victims: 2–3
- Span of crimes: 1981–1987
- Country: United States
- States: California, possibly Nevada
- Date apprehended: May 18, 1987
- Imprisoned at: California Health Care Facility, Stockton, California

Herbert James Coddington (born October 13, 1959) is an American murderer and suspected serial killer who murdered two elderly women following the kidnapping of two teenage models in South Lake Tahoe, California in 1987. He was convicted of these crimes and sentenced to death. He remains the prime suspect in the 1981 murder of a girl in Nevada.

== Early life ==
Little is known about Coddington's early life. Born October 13, 1959, in Morristown, New Jersey, he attended school in New York and was described as a "math whiz" by his friends. An avid gambler as an adult, Coddington supported himself by writing books on gambling and making investments.

At some point during his life, Coddington lived in Florida before moving on to Las Vegas, Nevada in the early 1980s.

== Murders ==
After living in the Las Vegas area for around five years, Coddington moved to South Lake Tahoe, California in January 1987. He was considered a strange loner by his neighbors, who rarely interacted with him. Starting in early May 1987, Coddington would go around various modeling agencies looking for teenage girls, claiming that he wanted to shoot a video about drug rehabilitation. After being turned down by multiple venues, his offer was taken up by 69-year-old Maybelle "Mabs" Martin, the owner of the Showcase Finishing & Modeling School based in Reno, Nevada. As part of the deal, Martin allowed two of her models - 14-year-old Alecia Thomas and 12-year-old Monica Berge - to star in Coddington's project, but only if she and her 67-year-old friend Dorothy "Dottie" Walsh accompanied them.

Coddington agreed to the terms and guided them to his mobile home in South Lake Tahoe. When Thomas and Berge arrived at the residence on May 16, he tied both of them up and forced them into a cubicle - this area, dubbed "the curious room", was padded and soundproofed. Later on, when Martin and Walsh arrived, Coddington proceeded to physically assault both of them within earshot of his teenage captives. Despite pleas for their lives to be spared, he proceeded to strangle both women with a piece of plastic and then stuffed their bodies in green trash bags. Over the next two days, Coddington blindfolded and sexually abused the two girls, all while wearing a mask and changing his voice in an attempt to fool them into believing that there was another man in the mobile home.

== Arrest and charges ==
Shortly after the disappearances of the four victims, their respective families reported them missing. A search was organized around the Lake Tahoe area, with officers receiving reports that a strange man had been going around inquiring about teenage models from various local agencies. After receiving tips about the man's car - an expensive silver-gray BMW sedan with a "TVETEN" license plate - FBI agents arrived at Coddington's mobile home in South Lake Tahoe. The agents knocked on the door, but when nobody opened and the light switch was turned off, they opened it by force. A search of the residence led to the discovery of Thomas and Berge, as well as the bodies of Martin and Walsh. While he was in the police car and his rights were being read, Coddington, seemingly relieved, confessed to the crimes and said that he had "bagged up" the two women so the police wouldn't have to see the "messies".

Soon after his arrest, Coddington was charged with two counts of first-degree murder, four counts of kidnapping and several counts of first-degree rape. In the aftermath of their rescue, both Thomas and Berge received psychological treatment before being returned to their parents' care in Reno.

At some point during investigations, Coddington was linked to an additional murder. On August 17, 1981, 12-year-old Sheila Jo Keister was hitchhiking near a mobile home in Las Vegas when she was abducted by an unknown assailant. Six hours later, her partially dressed body was found in the vicinity of Sunrise Mountain by two men who were out target shooting. Due to the similarities in the California crimes, he was immediately designated as the prime suspect and charged with her murder.

== Murder trial ==
After a long jury selection process, which included a detailed questionnaire about the prospective jurors' views on various topics and their personal habits, Coddington's trial began in Placerville in June 1988. From the very beginning, he and his lawyers entered an insanity plea.

Throughout the proceedings, the prosecutor placed heavy emphasis on the fact that Coddington showed no mercy to any of his victims. When asked about his motive, Coddington gave bizarre explanations in which he rambled about things such as smoking in casinos and "too many bad drivers" on the road. As a rebuttal to this argument, the attorneys argued that their client was deluded from having sexual fantasies about keeping the two teenage girls forever and them having his children, and that the murders of the two chaperones was spontaneous and unplanned. At one point during the trial, jurors were given a tour of the mobile home in which the crime was committed, but Coddington himself refused to attend the visit.

=== Sentencing ===
In August 1988, Coddington was found guilty on all counts, but was ordered to undergo a psychiatric assessment before sentencing. For the next few weeks, he was examined by psychiatrist Bruce Kaldor, who concluded in his findings that while Coddington suffered from personality disorders and held strange beliefs, he intentionally exaggerated them to trick jurors into believing he was insane. This stemmed from his claims that God supposedly sent him messages through traffic lights - Kaldor explained that this idea came from Coddington's personal belief in so-called "magic numbers" such as 44 and 26, which he took as signs to either continue or stop with his plans. He also insisted that while Coddington believed that causing harm was wrong, he could justify it if something more "joyful" resulted from it according to his worldview.

On September 14, 1988, a jury of nine women and three men began deliberations on whether he was sane. The following day, the jury returned a verdict of legally sane - upon hearing this, several people in the courtroom burst into tears, including Coddington, his mother, and several of the members of the jury. Coddington's parents apologized to the victims' family members for their son's actions, but continued to reiterate their belief that he was mentally ill and needed help. The final phase of the trial, the penalty phase, continued for several more days as jurors considered whether he should be sentenced to death or life imprisonment.

In the end, the jury returned a verdict of death for Coddington, citing the severity of his crimes. As a result, on January 21, 1989, Coddington was officially sentenced to death by Justice Terrence Finney.

== Current status ==
Since his conviction, Coddington has remained on California's death row and continues to appeal his sentence. His appeals were rejected by the Supreme Court of California in 2000, with the decision being upheld the following year.

Despite being charged with Keister's murder, Coddington was never put on trial for it and it officially remains unsolved.

== See also ==
- Capital punishment in California
- List of death row inmates in the United States § California
