= Blacklist Festival =

The Blacklist Festival is a three-day tribute to art and film. The festival is held each year in South Lake Tahoe, California, United States, and was originally started by a group of filmmakers and artists under the productions of 1134 Films. The objective of the festival is to present original and unapologetic art and films. The film screening and art display is held inside MontBleu Resort Casino & Spa and the music, after party and awards are held at various local venues. The Blacklist festival is dedicated to the people and arts that keep this world in balance.

== Award winners ==
Best Film
- 2006 Beast In Show - "Tour De Dude", directed by Brandon Rein
- 2007 Beast In Show - "Se Voir", directed by Jeff Speed
- 2008 Beast in Show - "Chickenfut", directed by Harrison Witt

Best Music Video
- 2008 Criminal Record Award - "Sounds of Truth", directed by Brian Thompson

Best Work of Art
- 2007 Art Beast - Shannon Orcutt
- 2008 Art Beast - Thatcher Unsworth

== Festival bands ==
- 2006 - Horror Business, Marones, Abaddon
- 2007 - ArnoCorps, Horror Business, Hyenas
- 2008 - Diablo Dimes, The Formaldabrides, The Hangmen, Naked Aggression
- 2009 - Catch Hell, Anxiety, The Dogs
