= Bijou Park, California =

Bijou Park
- Former unincorporated community District of South Lake Tahoe
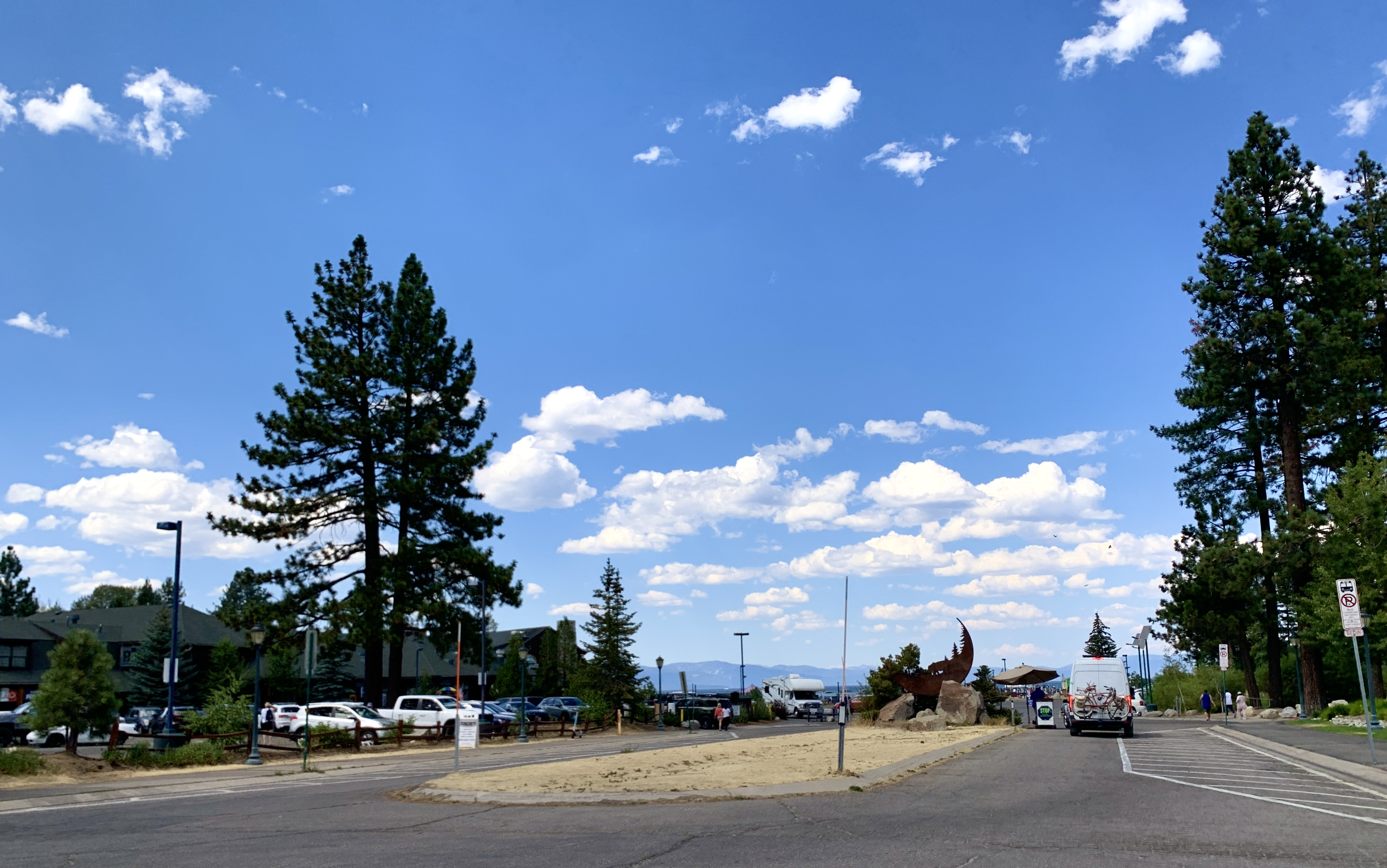

- Location in California
- Coordinates: 38°56′58″N 119°57′32″W
- Country: United States
- State: California
- County: El Dorado County
- City: South Lake Tahoe
- Elevation: 6,237 ft (1,901 m)

Bijou Park is a former unincorporated community now incorporated in South Lake Tahoe in El Dorado County, California. It is located east of Bijou, at an elevation of 6237 feet (1901 m).
