= South Lake Tahoe (Nevada gaming area) =

The NGCB South Lake Tahoe is a partial list of casinos in Douglas County, Nevada. Three other casinos in Douglas county are grouped with the 11 in Carson City, and are referred to as Carson Valley.

Although five licenses are in the county, one is just the race and sports book for the larger casino. Harvey's Resort Hotel dominates this county, and is the only casino with gaming revenue greater than $72 million per year.

LOC #	NAME	Slots	Games	Tables
01070-01	Harvey's Resort Hotel/Casino, Bill's Lake	1925	135	20
03132-03	Montbleu	610	36	6
29084-01	Montbleu-race Book and Sports Pool			
01190-03	Lake Tahoe Horizon Casino Resort	200	0	0
02082-04	Lakeside Inn	345	10	3
