= White Hall, California =

Unincorporated community in California, United States

White Hall
- Unincorporated community
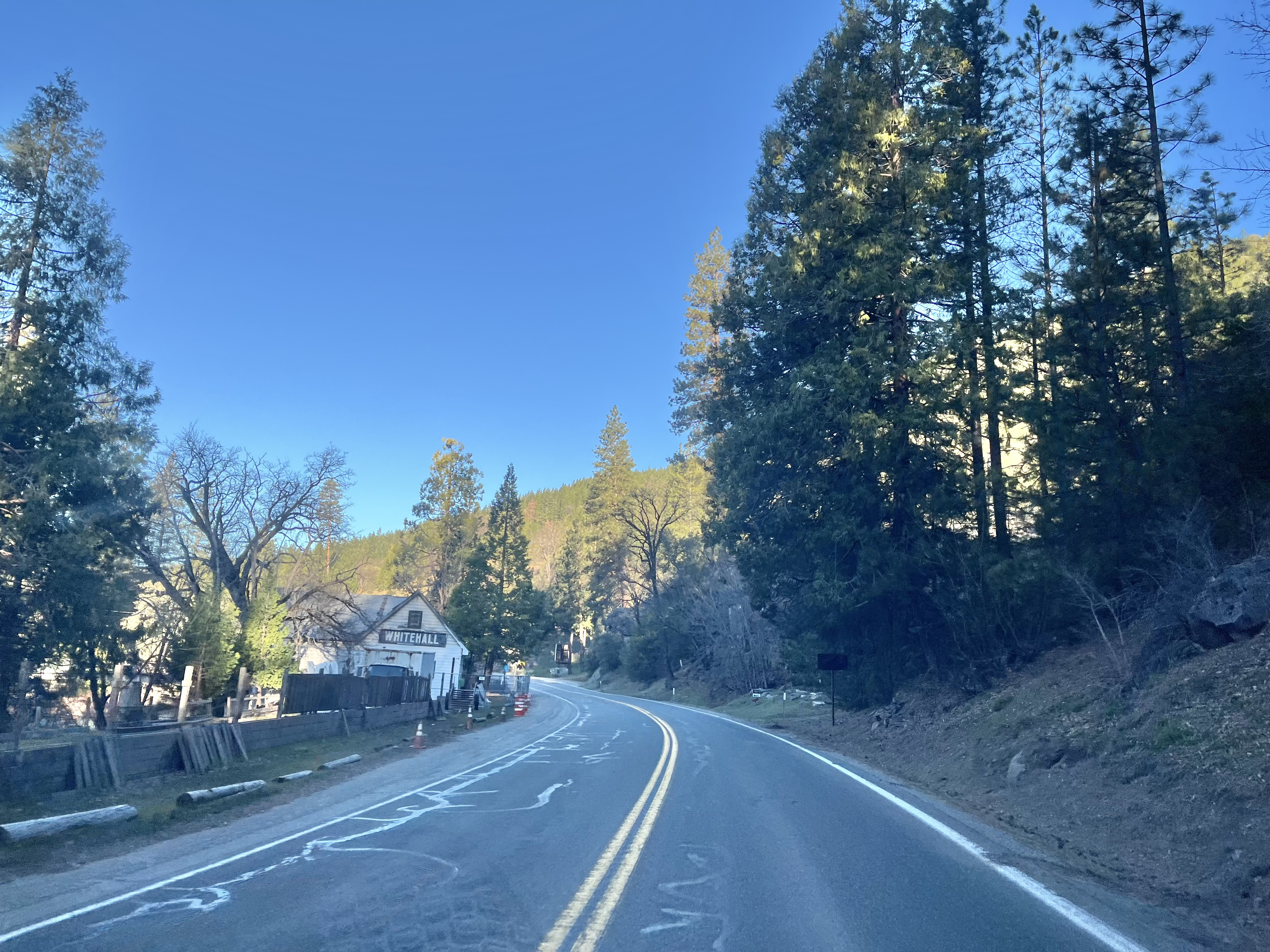

- Location in California White Hall (the United States)
- Coordinates: 38°46′31″N 120°24′19″W
- Country: United States
- State: California
- County: El Dorado
- Elevation: 3,383 ft (1,031 m)
- ZIP code: 95726
- Area code: 530

White Hall (formerly, Whitehall and Randall) is a small unincorporated community in El Dorado County, California, United States. It is located on the South Fork of the American River, 2.5 miles (4.0 km) east of Riverton, at an elevation of 3383 feet (1031 m). The ZIP code is 95726. The community is served by area code 530.

A post office operated at Randall from 1917 to 1937. The name Randall commemorates Albert B. Randall, its first postmaster.
