= Carson Valley Area =

Carson Valley gaming area consists of 11 casinos in the limits of Carson City, Nevada, plus three casinos in Douglas County that are physically located in the same valley. The three casinos in Douglas County are:

- Carson Valley Inn
- Sharkey's Nugget
- Topaz Lodge And Casino

The casinos in the valley are small compared to the ones in Reno/Sparks. None of them earned more than $72 million in fiscal year 2008. Collectively they have 700 rooms with none more than 152 rooms.

LOC #	NAME	Slots	Games	Tables
27482-01	Casino Fandango	725	11	3
00283-02	Carson Nugget, Inc.	689	9	2
04676-01	Carson Valley Inn	591	11	4
18009-02	Gold Dust West Carson City	400	6	1
21470-01	Slotworld	347	0	0
03511-06	Carson Station Hotel/Casino	304	7	0
03265-04	Bodine's	280	0	0
01035-03	Topaz Lodge and Casino	190	7	1
24951-03	Comstock Casino	220	0	0
00343-06	Sharkey's Nugget	180	0	0
00213-09	Carson Horseshoe Club	152	0	0
01994-06	Cactus Jack's Senator Club	130	0	2
27304-01	Dotty's #10	40	0	0
09142-01	Dotty's #12	40	0	0
