= Smithflat, California =

Unincorporated community in California, United States

Smithflat
- Unincorporated community
- Location in California Smithflat (the United States)
- Coordinates: 38°44′05″N 120°45′19″W
- Country: United States
- State: California
- County: El Dorado
- Elevation: 2,224 ft (678 m)

Smithflat (formerly, Smith's Flat, Smiths Flat, and Smith Flat) is an unincorporated community in El Dorado County, California, United States. It lies 4 km (2.5 mi) east of Placerville and 7.2 km (4.5 mi) west of Camino at an elevation of 2224 feet (678 m).

The Smith's Flat post office opened in 1876 and was renamed to Smithflat in 1895. The name honors Jeb Smith, a rancher who settled here early.

Smithflat was one of the 93 wagon train stops along the Johnson Pass route across the Sierra Nevada. The Smith Flat House, built in the 1850s, is the last of these stations still in existence. It is now a restaurant.
