= Riverton, California =

Unincorporated community in California, United States

Riverton
- Unincorporated community
- Location in California Riverton (the United States)
- Coordinates: 38°46′16″N 120°26′58″W
- Country: United States
- State: California
- County: El Dorado
- Elevation: 3,238 ft (987 m)

California Historical Landmark
- Official name: Moore's (Riverton)-Overland Pony Express route in California
- Reference no.: 705

Riverton (formerly Moore's Station and Moores) is a small unincorporated community in El Dorado County, California, United States. It is located on the South Fork of the American River, 8.5 miles (14 km) west of Kyburz, at an elevation of 3238 feet (987 m). The ZIP code is 95726. The community is served by area code 530.

The site was on a toll road operated by John M. Moore, and was originally called Moore's Station. A post office operated at Riverton from 1893 to 1898. The community is now registered as California Historical Landmark #705.
