= Kyburz, California =

Unincorporated community in California, United States

Kyburz
- Unincorporated community
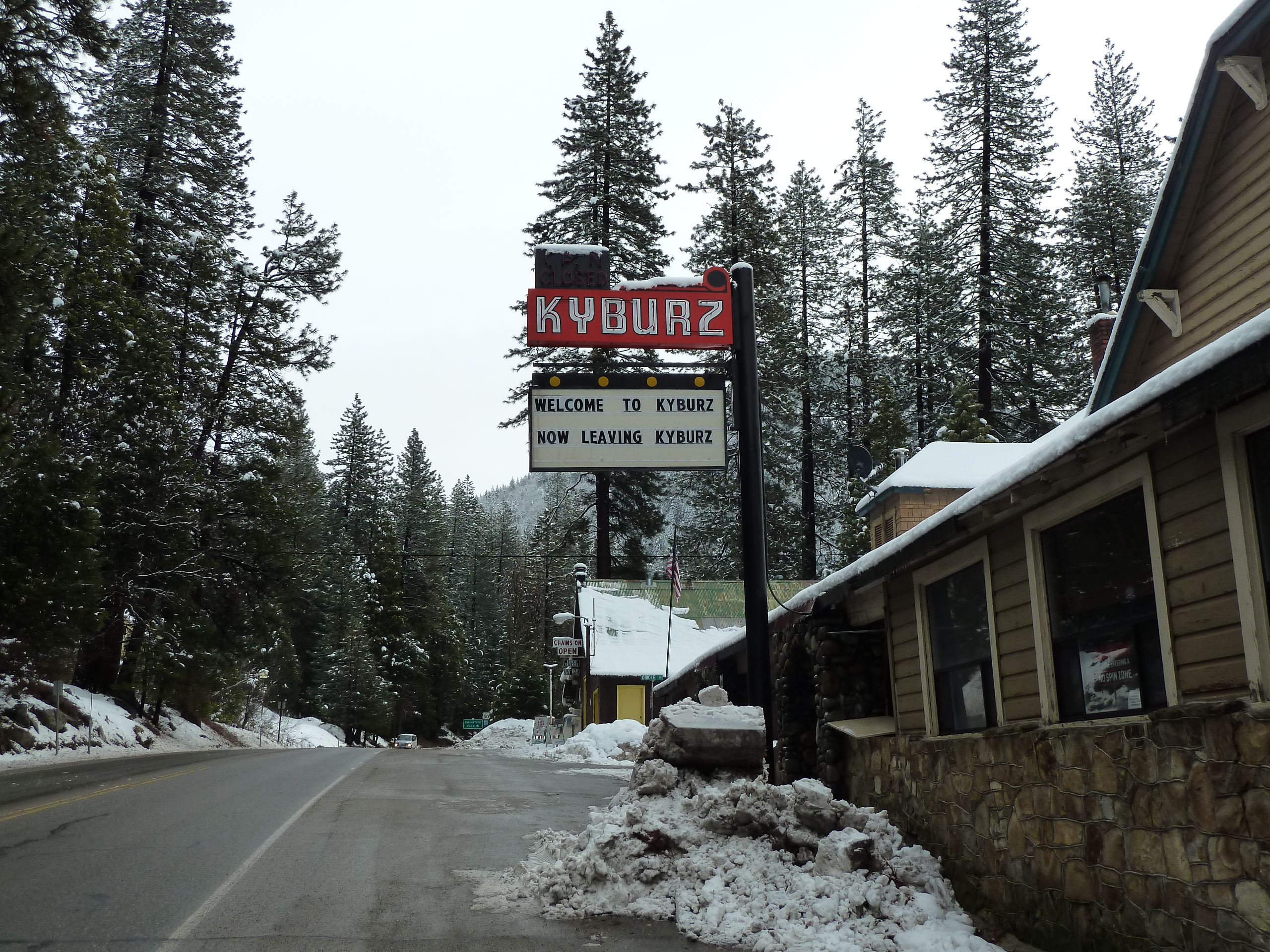
- The town as seen heading eastbound on US-50. The sign references a well-known joke about small towns.

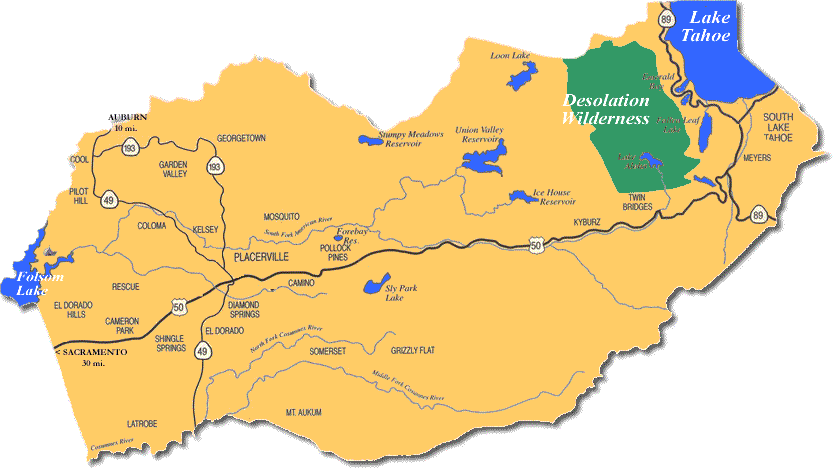
- Kyburz along US-50 in a map of El Dorado County

- Location in California
- Coordinates: 38°46′29″N 120°17′49″W
- Country: United States
- State: California
- County: El Dorado
- Elevation: 4,058 ft (1,237 m)

Population (2000)
  - Total: 167
- Time zone: UTC-8 (Pacific (PST))
  - Summer (DST): UTC-7 (PDT)
- ZIP code: 95720
- Area codes: 530, 837

Kyburz (formerly Slippery Ford and Slipperyford) is a small unincorporated community in El Dorado County, California, United States. It is located along the South Fork of the American River and U.S. Route 50, and is surrounded by the Eldorado National Forest. Its elevation is 4058 feet (1237 m) above sea level.

Settlement began one mile west at Webster’s Sugar Loaf House as a remount station for the pony express on April 3, 1860. The route ran through where US 50 locally is today. The Slippery Ford post office opened in 1861. The name was changed to Slipperyford in 1896, and to Kyburz in 1911, by its Postmaster Albert Kyburz, in memory of his father Samuel Kyburz, who was an early California pioneer with John Sutter. The locale was along the Lincoln Highway Sierra Nevada Southern Route by 1916.

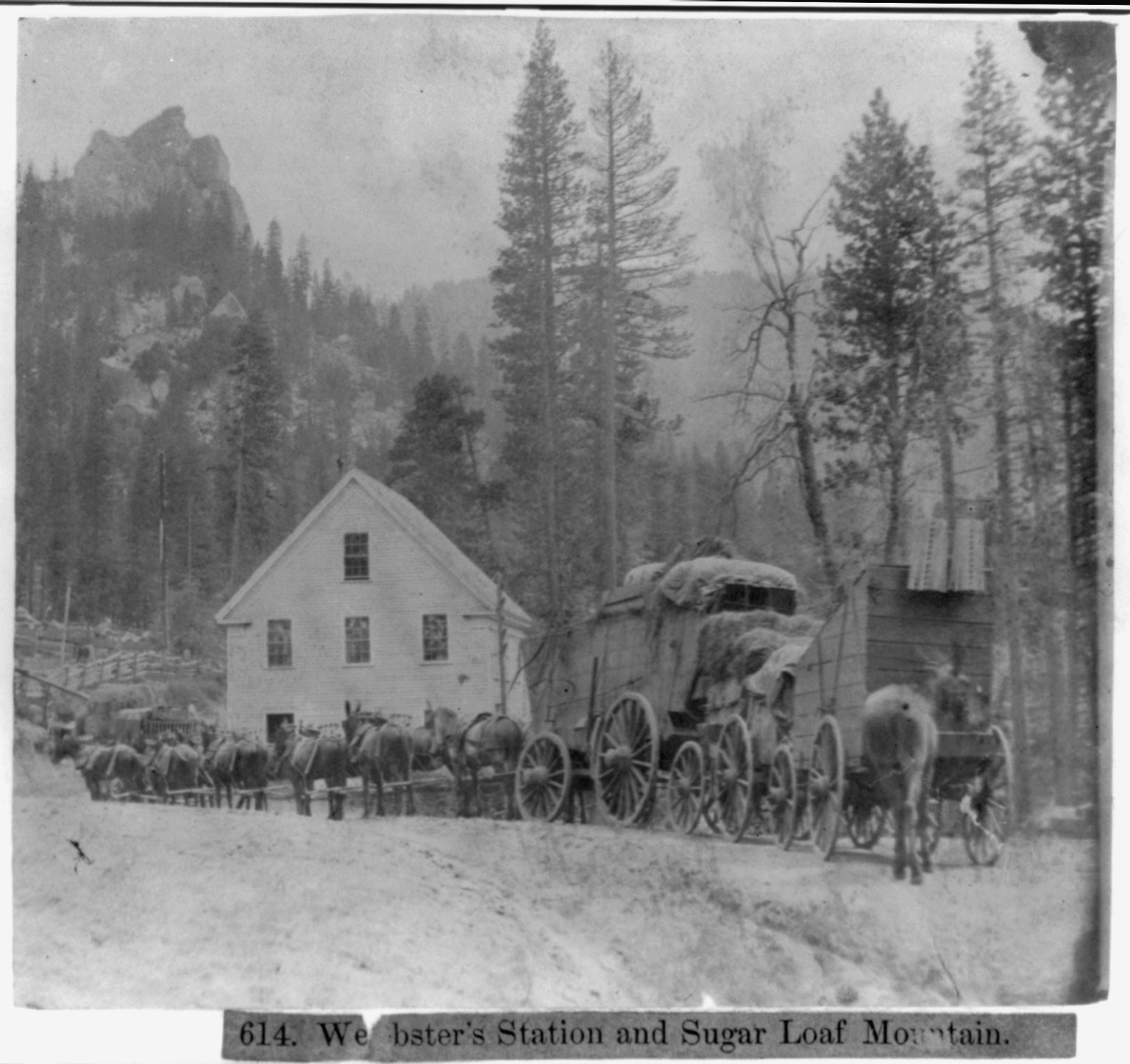
Webster's Station and Sugar Loaf Mountain, wagon in foreground

Ski racer Spider Sabich grew up in Kyburz, where his father, Vladimir Sr., was stationed with the California Highway Patrol. Spider and his younger brother Steve raced at the Edelweiss ski area, which closed in the 1960s, and is now known as Camp Sacramento.

== Demographics ==
As of the 2000 Census the population was 167, although the road sign on Highway 50 stated 139 as of 2008. This included 86 males and 81 females, 65 males age 18 and older, 66 females age 18 and older, 11 males age 65 or older, and 16 females age 65 or older. The median age was 45.5, and people age 18 and older numbered 131, age 21 and over 128, and age 65 and over 27.
