= California Historical Landmarks in El Dorado County =

This list includes properties and districts listed on the California Historical Landmark listing in El Dorado County, California. Click the "Map of all coordinates" link to the right to view a Google map of all properties and districts with latitude and longitude coordinates in the table below.

Image		Landmark name	Location	City or town	Summary
Coloma Road-Coloma	748	Coloma Road-Coloma	Marshall Gold Discovery State Historic Park; 38°48′08″N 120°53′34″W	Coloma	
Upload Photo	747	Coloma Road-Rescue	4222 Green Valley Rd at Rescue Junction General Store; 38°42′40″N 120°57′07″W	Rescue	
Condemned Bar	572	Condemned Bar	Folsom Lake State Recreation Area	Folsom	
Upload Photo	487	Diamond Springs	Hwy 49 and China Garden Rd. 38°41′41″N 120°48′54″W	Diamond Springs	
Upload Photo	486	El Dorado	Pleasant Valley Rd & Church St. 38°40′58″N 120°50′52″W	El Dorado	
El Dorado-Nevada House (Mud Springs) - Overland Pony Express Route in California	700	El Dorado-Nevada House (Mud Springs) - Overland Pony Express Route in California	Pleasant Valley Rd. near Church St.	El Dorado	
Friday's Station - Overland Pony Express Route in California	728	Friday's Station - Overland Pony Express Route in California	Stateline, Hwy 50; 38°57′51″N 119°56′21″W	Friday's Station	
Upload Photo	484	Georgetown	Georgetown Fire Station; 38°54′24″N 120°50′20″W	Georgetown	
Gold discovery site	530	Gold discovery site	Marshall Gold Discovery State Historic Park; 38°48′00″N 120°53′48″W	Coloma	
Upload Photo	521	Greenwood	State Hwy 193 and Greenwood St. 38°53′48″N 120°54′46″W	Greenwood	
Hangman's Tree	141	Hangman's Tree	305 Main St. 38°43′42″N 120°48′09″W	Placerville	
Upload Photo	319	Marshall's Blacksmith Shop	State Hwy 193	Kelsey	On private property
Marshall Monument	143	Marshall Monument	Marshall Gold Discovery State Historic Park; 38°47′48″N 120°53′40″W	Coloma	
Upload Photo	767	Methodist Episcopal Church	1031 Thompson Way; 38°43′40″N 120°47′40″W	Placerville	
Moore's (Riverton) - Overland Pony Express Route in California	705	Moore's (Riverton) - Overland Pony Express Route in California	U.S. Hwy 50 and Ice House Rd. 38°46′16″N 120°26′57″W	Kyburz	
Mormon Island	569	Mormon Island	Folsom Lake State Recreation Area; 38°42′13″N 121°07′03″W	Folsom	
Mormon Tavern - Overland Pony Express Route in California	699	Mormon Tavern - Overland Pony Express Route in California	38°39′22″N 121°03′35″W	El Dorado Hills	
Mountain Quarries Railroad Bridge	1051	Mountain Quarries Railroad Bridge	38°54′46″N 121°02′25″W	Auburn, California	
Negro Hill	570	Negro Hill	Folsom Lake State Recreation Area	Folsom	
Upload Photo	475	Old Dry Higgins-Old Hangtown	Bedford and Main St. 38°43′47″N 120°47′57″W	Placerville	
Placerville - Overland Pony Express Route in California	701	Placerville - Overland Pony Express Route in California	Main St. & Sacramento St. 38°43′40″N 120°48′12″W	Placerville	
Pleasant Grove House - Overland Pony Express Route in California	703	Pleasant Grove House - Overland Pony Express Route in California	Green Valley Rd. 38°41′53″N 121°01′14″W	Rescue	
Salmon Falls	571	Salmon Falls	Folsom Lake State Recreation Area; 38°45′29″N 121°03′30″W	Folsom	
Upload Photo	456	Shingle Springs	Historic district 38°39′57″N 120°55′34″W	Shingle Springs	
Upload Photo	551	Site of California's First Grange Hall	State Hwy 49; 38°50′38″N 121°00′54″W	Pilot Hill	
Sportsman's Hall - Overland Pony Express Route in California	704	Sportsman's Hall - Overland Pony Express Route in California	5622 Old Pony Express Trail; 38°45′00″N 120°36′41″W	Cedar Grove	
Strawberry Valley House - Overland Pony Express Route in California	707	Strawberry Valley House - Overland Pony Express Route in California	Hwy 50; 38°47′44″N 120°08′54″W	Strawberry	
Upload Photo	142	Studebaker's Shop	543 Main St. 38°43′46″N 120°47′51″W	Placerville	
Wakamatsu Tea and Silk Farm Colony	815	Wakamatsu Tea and Silk Farm Colony	Gold Trails Elementary School, 889 Cold Springs Rd.	Gold Hill	
Yank's Station - Overland Pony Express Route in California	708	Yank's Station - Overland Pony Express Route in California	Yank's Station shopping center 38°51′22″N 120°00′47″W	Meyers	
Site of Echo Summit	1048	Site of Echo Summit	Just off of Hwy 50, in the entrance to the parking lot for Adventure Mountain recreation area. 38°48′51″N 120°02′03″W	Echo Summit	

== See also ==
- List of California Historical Landmarks
- National Register of Historic Places listings in El Dorado County, California
