= Green Springs Ranch =

Coordinates: 38°42′06″N 121°02′05″W

Green Springs Ranch is a ranch in El Dorado County, California. It lies at an elevation of 1040 feet (317 m). Formerly The Hitchcock Ranch, California, its postal zip code is 95672 Rescue, California. History of Green Springs Ranch @edcgov.us

== Historical background ==
The lands later known as the Green Springs Ranch can be first traced to ownership by John and Nicholas Hobart. Although it cannot be confirmed in the 1850 census that the Hobart brothers were specifically on this property, they were assessed for $3,000 in value for a "Green Springs Hotel" later in 1850. They may indeed be the first formal landowners, and the builders of the hotel. By June 1850, the brothers were advertising that the Green Springs Hotel, with four rooms on each floor, available for rent, served by the Birch stage line (Placer Times newspaper June 7, 1850).

Rufus Hitchcock and his family had come to California apparently in 1849, and were listed twice in El Dorado County in the 1850 United States census. The earlier of the two listings (October 1850) places him on the Green Springs property in a hotel. His wife, Nancy, is also listed as well as five young women with no occupation listed, two young men, said to be laborers, and a four-year-old girl, possibly a granddaughter of Nancy Hitchcock. One of the young women is Helen Trombly, reportedly the daughter of Nancy Hitchcock from her first marriage to Burrows. She is listed as 18 years old. Their nearest neighbors are the Hobart brothers, also listed with a hotel.

Rufus Hitchcock may have had a survey completed for a pre-emption claim for the ranch, Hitchcock Ranch, California but it was not filed with the county. The family apparently took over the ranch in 1850, but remained mobile. The second federal census listing in 1850 for Rufus Hitchcock shows him in Placerville, California and vicinity, and dated to November 1850. His occupation is not legible, but again, his household includes Nancy, Ellen Hitchcock (possibly Helen Trombly) and a single woman, age 24, with no occupation. There is also a 46-year-old male clerk in the house, and Hitchcock declares a net worth of $25,000, far higher than any other individuals in the area.

Rufus Hitchcock was apparently a notorious individual. A synopsis by a family member sent to the El Dorado County, California Pioneer Cemeteries Commission states that in the Fremont County, Iowa County history (no publication information provided), mentioned that he settled in the County in 1839, with Arthur Burris (also spelled as Burrows and Burras) and Mrs. Rice, all from Indiana. They settled at Pleasant Grove in 1839 and 1840. Hitchcock and Burris were the second settlers in the region, with their principal trade in whiskey. In 1840, one of the local settlers reported that Mrs. Burris and her daughters were the only white women in the county. Domestic discord caused a split in the Burris marriage; and they split up in the fall of 1840. Mrs. Burris reportedly obtained a divorce and married Hitchcock. The couple traveled westward in 1847 or 1848.

Hitchcock reportedly rented the old armory building at Sutter's Fort in 1848, with a boarding house upstairs and a bar room with a monte table on the first floor. The family then was supposed to include Rufus, his wife, two daughters, and a son. Rufus Hitchcock died April 8, 1851 (Sacramento Daily Union newspaper April 15, 1851), with family lore suggesting the death was caused by smallpox. A husband of the daughter of Mrs. Hitchcock puts his cause of death as "apoplexy." Hitchcock was reported to have been buried at the cemetery at Sutter's Fort . His stepdaughter, Susan, who died in 1849, and was placed at the cemetery, was disinterred and moved to lie next to Hitchcock's grave about 300 feet away (Sacramento Daily Union newspaper January 2, 1860).

Nancy Hitchcock remained at the ranch with her one of her daughters from her first marriage, Mrs. Helen Trombly. Mrs. Nancy Burrows Hitchcock formally purchased the land from the Hobart brothers on November 3, 1851 for $500. Mrs. Trombly filed a pre-emption claim on the property in late 1851.

The 1852 California State census is difficult to read, but Nancy Hitchcock is listed with son Rufus, age 15, daughter Ellen or Helen Trombly, and a two-year named Eliza Trombly, likely Helen's daughter. The story for the Hitchcock family remains a tragedy. A report published in February 1853 states: "The small-pox has not disappeared from Coloma, California and its neighborhood. Seventeen cases were reported at Green Springs, of which three had died" (Sacramento Daily Union newspaper, February 28, 1853).

One of the victims of the disease was reportedly Nancy Hitchcock, with her nieces also reportedly dying from the disease. It is possible that the nieces mentioned are actually the two young granddaughters mentioned in the census rolls: the 4-year-old in 1850 at the ranch and Eliza Trombley. In December 1853, an advertisement had been placed in the newspaper for a Probate sale of her estate to be conducted on January 16, 1854. At this point, the Green Springs Rancho included the Green Springs House and 320 acres, stables, barns and outhouses (Sacramento Daily Union newspaper, December 30, 1854). It has been speculated that Mrs. Hitchcock and her nieces were buried on the ranch. It seems more likely that the young girls were actually Mrs. Hitchcock's granddaughters rather than nieces.

The purchaser of the property appears to have been William Dormody December 21, 1853 for $6,400 Dormody, born in 1796 in Ireland, lived at the ranch until his death in an accident in 1876 (Sacramento Daily Union newspaper September 9, 1876). Dormody is buried at St. John's Cemetery in Folsom, California with wife Sarah (died 1902) and daughter Sarah (died 1892). Members of the Dormody family continued to live at the ranch until 1955, at which point the land was sold to Howard & Beatrice Greenhalgh October 4, 1955

In 1859, a headstone for a Hitchcock stepdaughter, Susan, was found by the Sacramento River. Susan had been buried at Sutter's Fort in 1849 (Sacramento Daily Union newspaper December 9, 1859). A friend or relative who lived in Campo Seco, California wrote to the newspaper in response to the article. Although some of their facts were contradictory to other articles, the writer suggested that Mrs. Hitchcock and her eldest son were buried at the ranch. The writer also suggested that Susan had died and been buried at the ranch as well, not at Sutter's Fort (Sacramento Daily Union newspaper December 16, 1859). Susan's brother in law, who ordered the tombstone, confirms that her grave with that of Rufus Hitchcock at the Fort cemetery (Sacramento Daily Union newspaper January 2, 1860)

== Today ==
The descendants of William and Sarah Dormody own just 28 acres of what was nearly 1,000 acres at one time. In 1976 the largest parcel of over 520 acres was divided into 104 RE5 ranchettes and became The Green Springs Ranch Rural Development a.k.a. The Green Springs Ranch Landowners Association today. A parcel of 20 Acres became Pleasant Grove Middle School on Green Valley Rd across the street from the historic Pleasant Grove Pony Express station originally built by Rufus Hitchcock the earlier owner of Green Springs Ranch. Another 20 Acres next door to the school is now owned by El Dorado Union High School District and a remaining 146 acres at 2400 Green Valley Rd between Deer Valley Road and Pleasant Grove Middle school is owned by Dennis Graham developing The Springs Equestrian Center.
