= Powningville, California =

Coordinates: 38.8285°N 120.9710°W

Powningville is a former settlement in El Dorado County, California, United States. It was located 3 miles (4.8 km) to 4 miles (6.4 km) east-northeast of Pilot Hill. Amos Bowman's map of the Georgetown Divide in El Dorado County shows a single tunnel owned by the Fairmount Copper Mining Company in the hill north of the town. Sometime before 1883, Powningville was involved in a dispute with the Nevada state government regarding a state prison.
