= Marshall's Blacksmith Shop =

Historical Landmark in Kelsey, California, United States

- Location within California Location within the United States
- 38.79°N 120.81°W
- Location: Gray Eagle Mine, Kelsey, California

History
- Built: 1872

California Historical Landmark
- Reference no.: 319

Marshall's Blacksmith Shop is a California Historical Landmark No. 319, now on the private property in Kelsey, California. The Blacksmith Shop was built in 1872 off of what is now California State Route 193 in El Dorado County, California at Gray Eagle Mine. James W. Marshall was a Blacksmith, a carpenter and sawmill operator. The Gray Eagle mine and ore mill is a lode gold mine on 13.2 acres of land in the Mother Lode Country, just south of Kelsey. Marshall was part owner of the Gray Eagle mine.

James Wilson Marshall (1810–1885) on January 24, 1848, found gold at Sutter's Mill in Coloma, California on the American River about 36 miles northeast of Sacramento. His find stated the California Gold Rush. Johann (John) Sutter had hired Marshall to build a sawmill at Sutter's Mill. Marshall and Sutter in the end did not profit from the gold find. This is a California Historical Landmark to Marshall at Marshall Gold Discovery State Historic Park.

== See also ==
- Marshall Gold Discovery State Historic Park
- List of California state parks
- California Historical Landmarks in El Dorado County
