= Yalisumni, California =

Human settlement in El Dorado County, California, United States of America

Coordinates: 38.6071°N 121.3063°W

Yalisumni is a former Nisenan settlement in El Dorado County, California, United States. It was located near Salmon Falls on the south side of the South Fork of the American River; its precise location is unknown.

It was a source of workers for John Sutter's New Helvetia settlement, located in present-day Sacramento between Yalisumni and another Nisenan settlement, Pujuni.
