= Sutter's Fort =

Historic park in Sacramento, California

- U.S. National Register of Historic Places
- California Historical Landmark
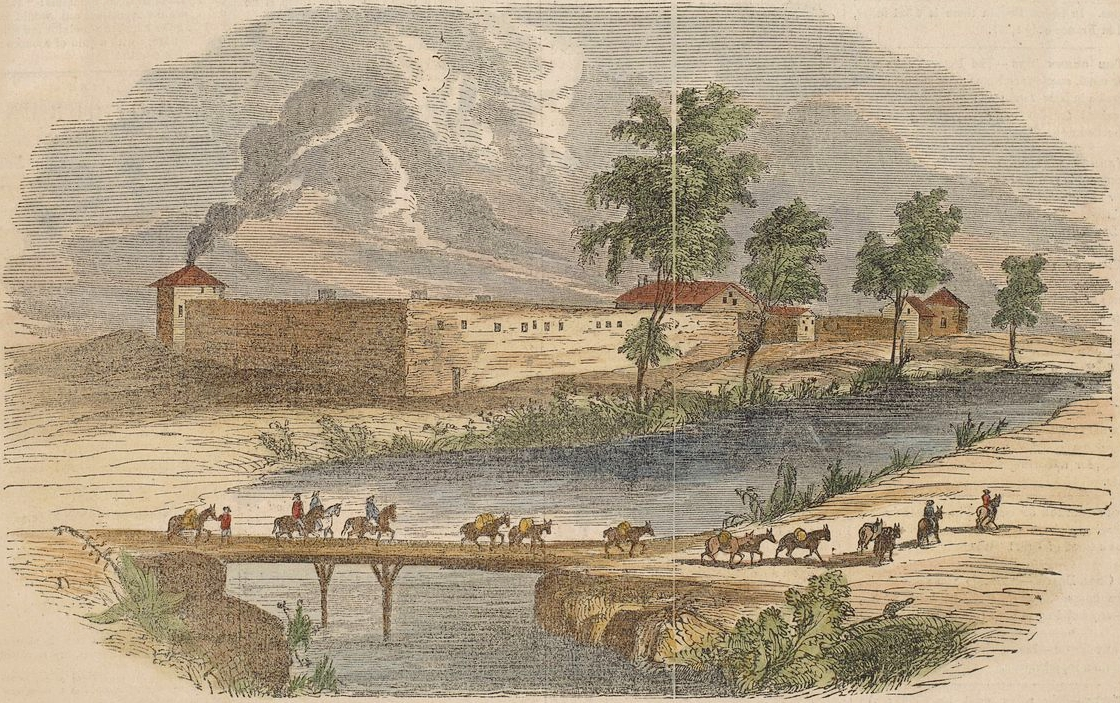
- Sutter's Fort, 1840s illustration

- Location within Sacramento, California Location within California Location within the United States
- Location: 2701 L Street; Sacramento, California
- Coordinates: 38°34′20.9″N 121°28′16.4″W
- NRHP reference No.: 66000221
- CHISL No.: 745 & 591
- Added to NRHP: October 15, 1966

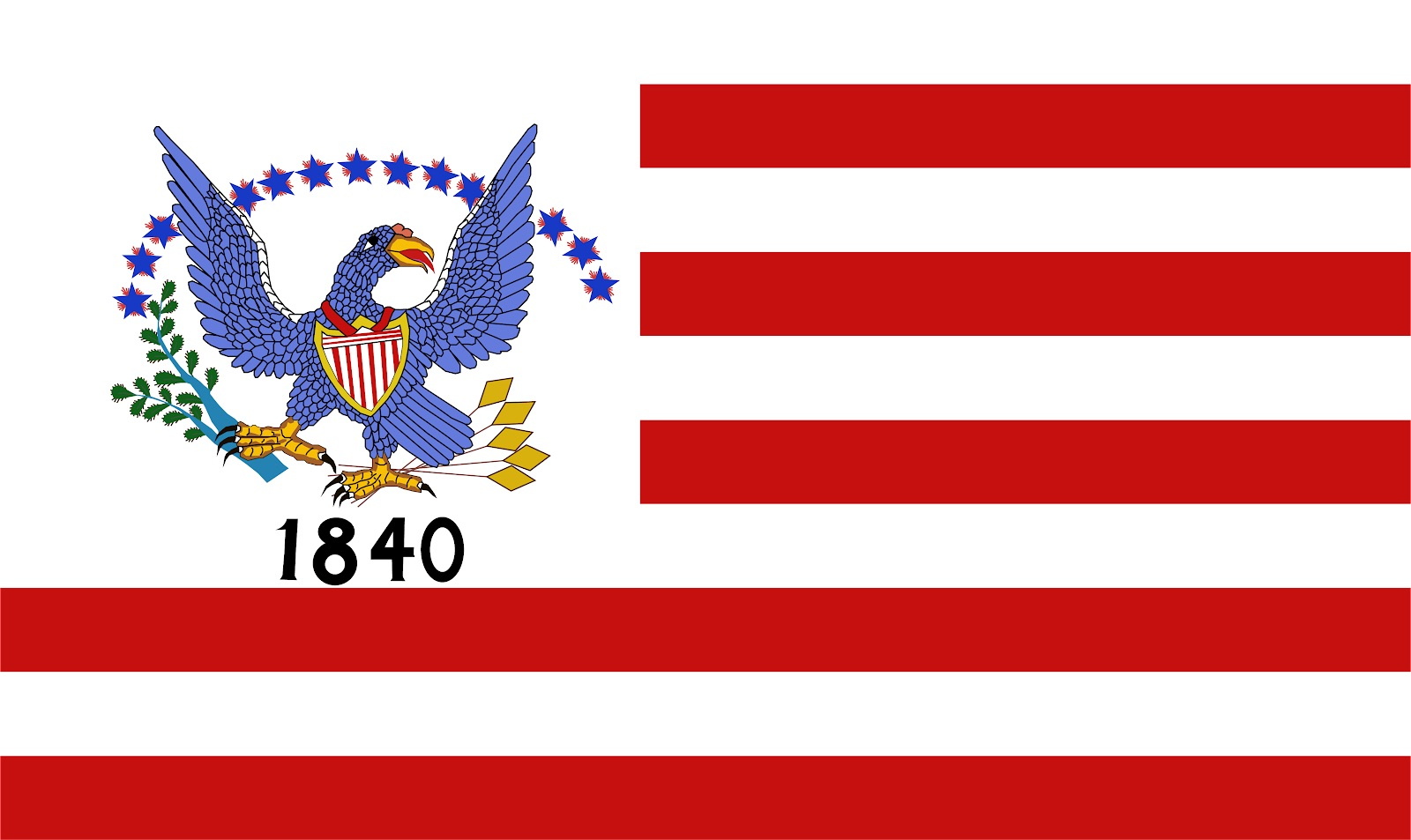
Sutter's Fort flag, c. 1839–1848

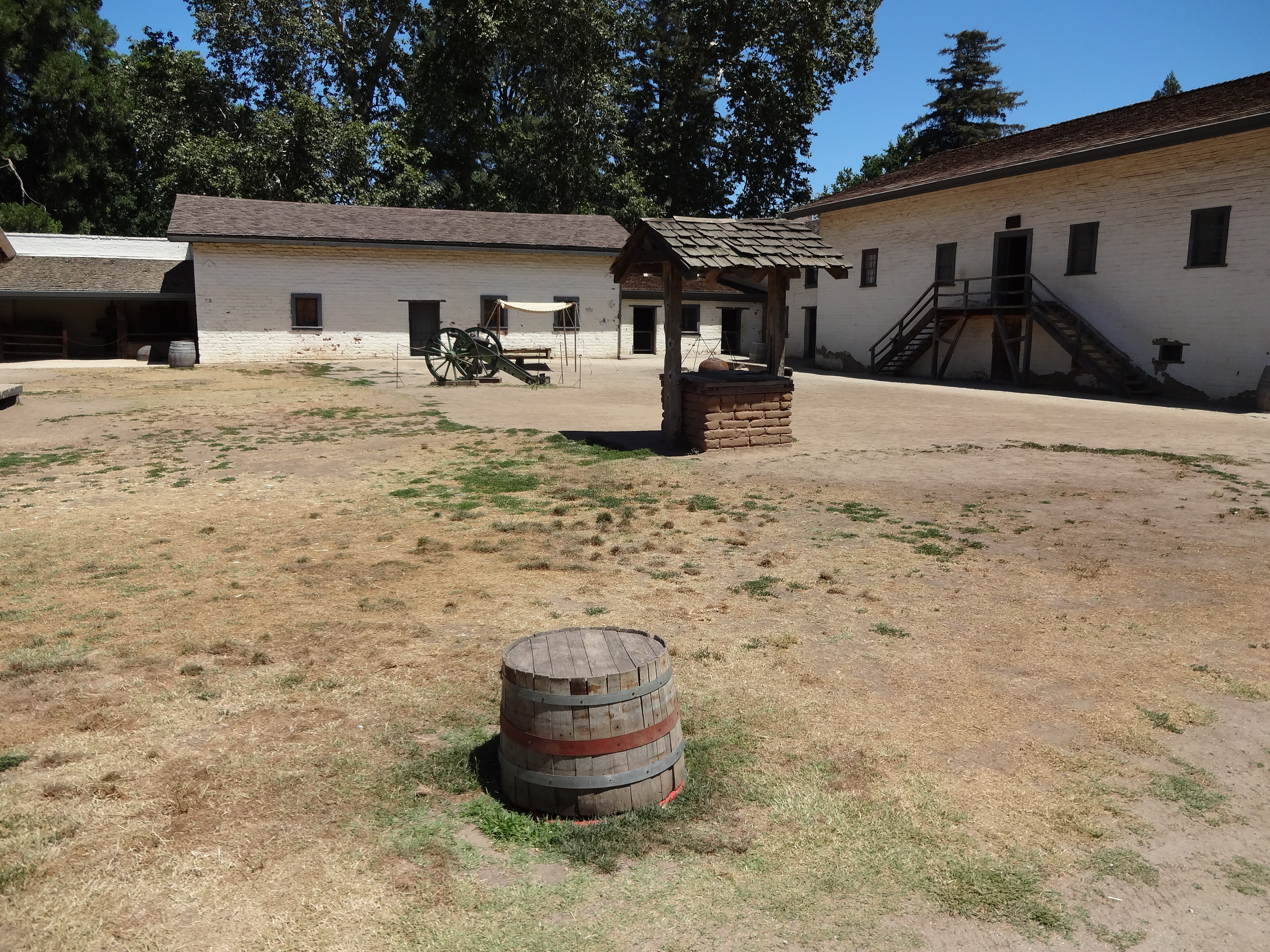
Sutter's Fort interior

Sutter's Fort lone star flag, c. 1846

Sutter's Fort was a 19th-century agricultural and trade colony in the Mexican Alta California province. Established in 1839, the site of the fort was originally part of a utopian colonial project called New Helvetia (New Switzerland) by its builder John Sutter, though construction of the fort proper would not begin until 1841. The fort was the first non-Indigenous community in the California Central Valley, and saw grave mistreatment of Indigenous laborers in plantation or feudal style conditions. The fort is famous for its association with the Donner Party, the California gold rush, and the formation of the city of Sacramento, surrounding the fort. It is notable for its proximity to the end of the California and Siskiyou Trails, which it served as a waystation.

In modern times, the adobe structure has been restored to its original condition and is now administered by the California Department of Parks and Recreation. It was designated a National Historic Landmark in 1961.

== History ==
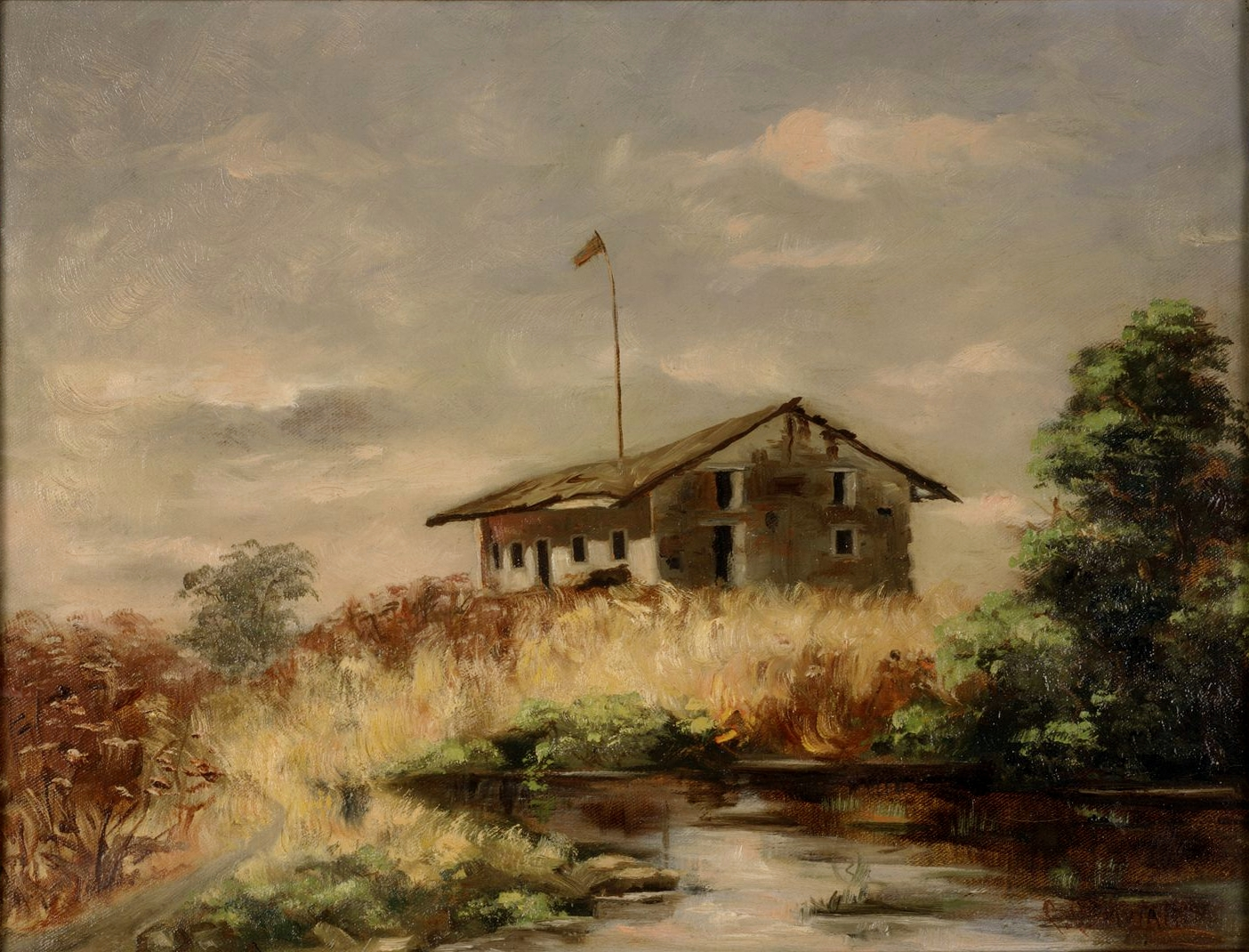
Painting of Sutter's Fort ruins, c. 1900

To build his colony, John Sutter secured a 50,000-acre land grant in the Central Valley from the Mexican governor. The main building of the fort, a two-story adobe structure built between 1841 and 1843, was constructed using Indigenous forced labor. It is the only original surviving structure at the reconstructed Sutter's Fort State Historic Park. On January 28, 1848, James Marshall met privately with John Sutter inside this building to show him the gold found during the construction of Sutter's Mill along the American River four days earlier. Sutter built the original fort with walls 2.5 feet (0.76 m) thick and between 15 and 18 feet (5.5 m) high. Pioneers began settling at Sutter's Fort around 1841. Following the start of the California Gold Rush, the fort was largely deserted by the 1850s and fell into disrepair.

=== Construction ===
The party led by John Sutter landed on the bank of the American River in August 1839. The group included three Europeans and a Native American boy, probably to serve as an interpreter. Some of the first people brought to the colony were Native Hawaiian workers, called Kanakas. Sutter had entered a contract with the governor of Hawaii to import and use the labor of these eight men and two women for three years. Once the first camp was set up, Sutter used local Miwok, Nisenan, and "missionized" Native Californians to build the first building, a three-room adobe.

=== Agricultural colony ===
Once the fort was built, Sutter established an agricultural colony with labor structures similar to Southern plantations and European feudalism. The colony relied on ranching and growing wheat crops. European colonists oversaw Native Californian and Native Hawaiian workers, who were often gravely mistreated. Sutter employed a caste system to ensure that the minority European settlers maintained control over the colony. Although some of the laborers worked voluntarily, many were subjected to brutal conditions that resembled enslavement or serfdom.

=== Decline ===
After gold was discovered at Sutter's Mill (also owned by John Sutter) in Coloma on January 24, 1848, the fort was abandoned.

=== Preservation ===
John Sutter's desk, photographed at Sutter's Fort State Historic Park

In 1891, the Native Sons of the Golden West, who sought to safeguard many of the landmarks of California's pioneer days, purchased and rehabilitated Sutter's Fort when the City of Sacramento sought to demolish it. Repair efforts were completed in 1893 and the fort was given by the Native Sons of the Golden West to the State of California. In 1947, the fort was transferred to the authority of California State Parks as Sutter's Fort State Historic Park.

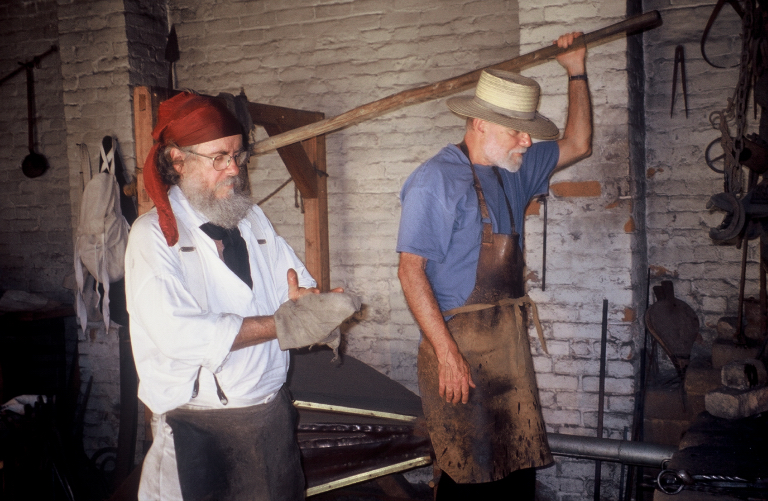
Making nails at Sutter's Fort, Sacramento

Most of the original neighborhood structures were initially built in the late 1930s as residences, many of which have been converted to commercial uses such as private medical practices. The history of the neighborhood is largely residential.

== Geography and hydrology ==
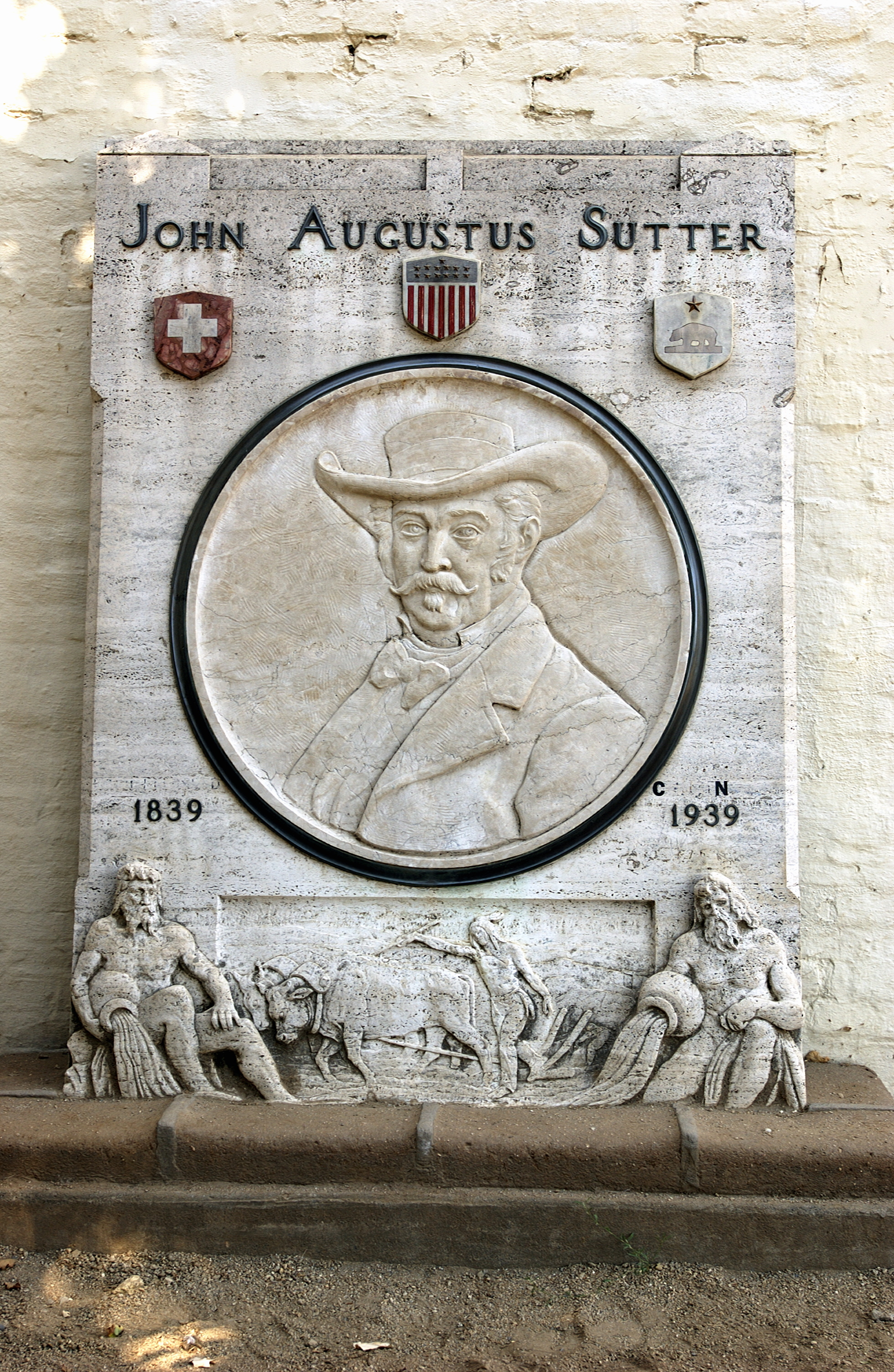
John Sutter plaque at Sutter's Fort

Sutter's Fort is located on level ground at an elevation of approximately 20 feet (6.1 m) above mean sea datum. The slope elevation decreases northward toward the American River and westward toward the Sacramento River. Slope elevation gradually increases to the south and east, away from the rivers. All surface drainage flows toward the Sacramento River. Groundwater in the vicinity flows south-southwest toward the Sacramento Delta. However, after peak rainfall, the Sacramento River swells and the groundwater flow can actually reverse away from the river.

=== Sutter's Landing ===
Sutter's Landing is the spot where John Sutter landed in August 1839 at the American River after coming up the Sacramento River from Yerba Buena at 38.5816°N 121.4660°W. After landing, Sutter built a base camp, then Sutter's Fort. The site of the landing is California Historical Landmark #591, listed on May 22, 1957.

=== Coloma Road ===
The old Coloma Road opened in 1847, running from Sutter's Fort to the city of Coloma. James Marshall traveled the road to tell of his gold find to John Sutter. During the 49ers gold rush thousands of miners traveled the road heading out to look for gold and claims. Coloma Road at Sutter's Fort is California Historical Landmark No. 745. There are two other California Historical Landmarks located on Coloma Road: California Historical Landmark No. 748, in Coloma and California Historical Landmark No. 747 at Marshall Gold Discovery State Historic Park. California's first stage line, California Stage Company, traveled the road starting in 1849. The line was founded by James E. Birch.

== See also ==
- New Helvetia Cemetery (formerly "Sutter Fort Burying Ground")
- California State Indian Museum
- Old Sacramento State Historic Park
- History of Sacramento, California
- List of California State Historic Parks
- California Historical Landmarks in Sacramento County, California
- National Register of Historic Places listings in Sacramento County, California
- John Sutter's relationship with Native Americans
- Ranchos of California
