= Marshall Gold Discovery State Historic Park =

State park in California

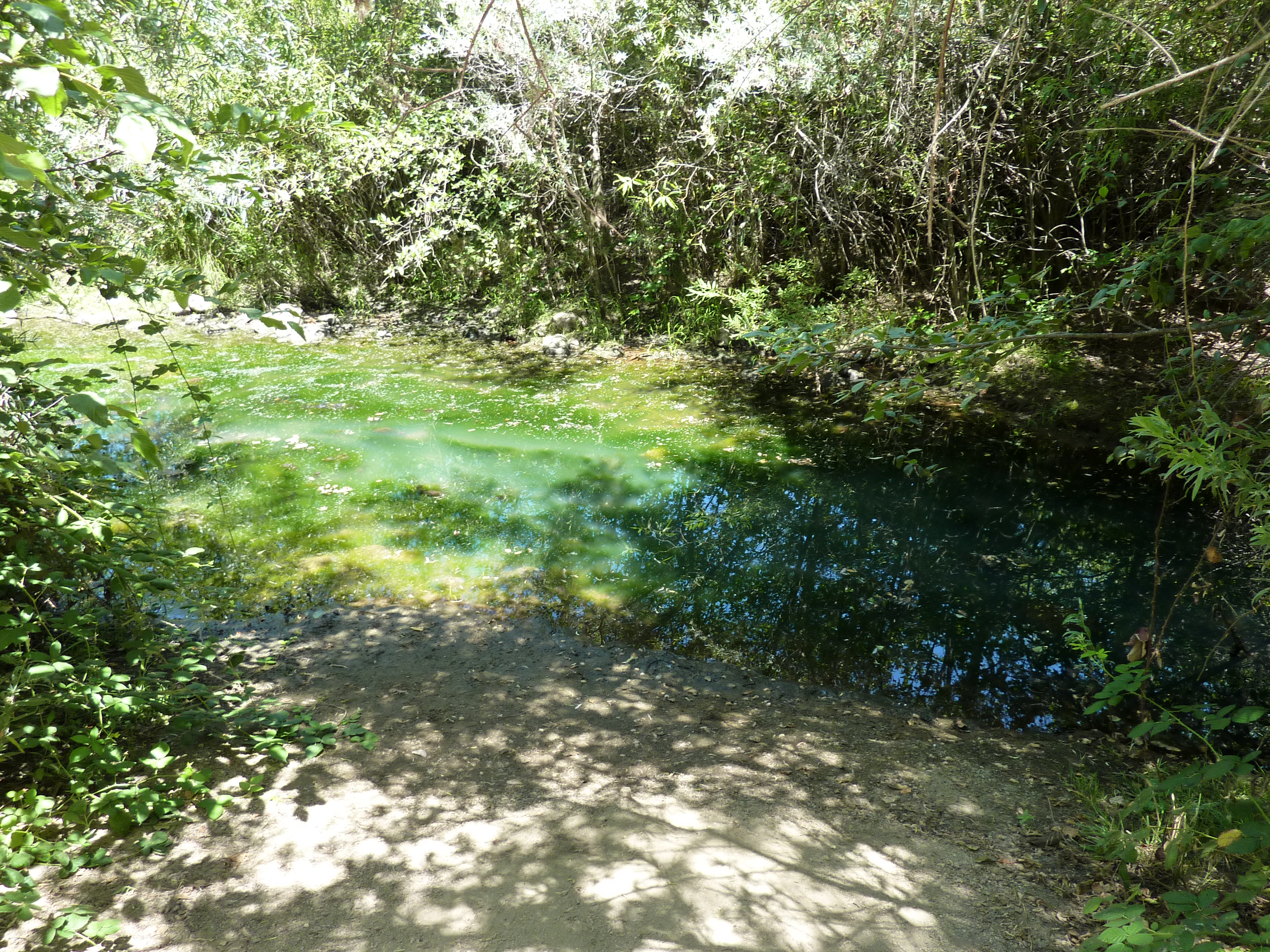
- The actual spot where James W. Marshall discovered gold in 1848

- Location within California Location within the United States
- Location: Coloma, California, U.S.
- Nearest city: Placerville, California
- Coordinates: 38.800°N 120.894°W
- Area: 576 acres (233 ha)
- Established: 1942
- Governing body: California Department of Parks and Recreation

California Historical Landmark
- Official name: Marshall Monument
- Reference no.: 143

California Historical Landmark
- Official name: Gold Discovery Site
- Reference no.: 530

California Historical Landmark
- Official name: Coloma Road
- Reference no.: 748

Marshall Gold Discovery State Historic Park is a state park of California, United States, marking the discovery of gold by James W. Marshall at Sutter's Mill in 1848, sparking the California Gold Rush. The park grounds include much of the historic town of Coloma, California, which is now considered a ghost town as well as a National Historic Landmark District. The park contains the California Historical Landmarks: a monument to commemorate James Marshall (#143), the actual spot where he first discovered gold in 1848 (#530) and Coloma Road (#748). Established in 1942, the park now comprises 576 acres (233 ha) in El Dorado County.

== Features ==
The entire route of California State Route 153 lies within the park, and allows visitors to drive to the top of the hill where the monument to James W. Marshall stands. The Gold Discovery Museum features Gold Rush-era exhibits including mining equipment, horse-drawn vehicles, household implements and other memorabilia. The American River Nature Center, operated by the American River Conservancy, features murals of local wildlife, hands-on exhibits, animal mounts and live small animals.

== History ==
In 1886 the members of the Native Sons of the Golden West, Placerville Parlor #9, felt that Marshall deserved a monument to mark the grave of the "Discoverer of Gold". In May 1890, five years after Marshall's death, Placerville Parlor #9 successfully advocated the idea of a monument to the State Legislature, which appropriated a total of $9,000 for the construction of the monument and tomb, the first such monument erected in California. A statue of Marshall stands on top of the monument, pointing to the spot where he made his discovery in 1848. The monument was rededicated October 8, 2010 by the Native Sons of the Golden West, Georgetown Parlor #91, in honor of the 200th anniversary of James W. Marshall's birth. The California Historical Landmark No. 143 marker is at 310 Back Street, 38.7965°N 120.8945°W.

The old Coloma Road opened in 1847, running Sutter's Fort to the city of Coloma. Marshall traveled the road to tell of his gold find to John Sutter. During the California Gold Rush, thousands of miners traveled the road heading out to look for gold and claims. California's first stage line, California Stage Company, traveled the road starting in 1849. The line was founded by James E. Birch. The Coloma Road is designated as California Historical Landmark No. 748. A marker is in the Gold Discovery parking area at 38.8023°N 120.8927°W. There is a second Coloma Road California Historical Landmark, No. 747, in Rescue, California.

== Gallery ==
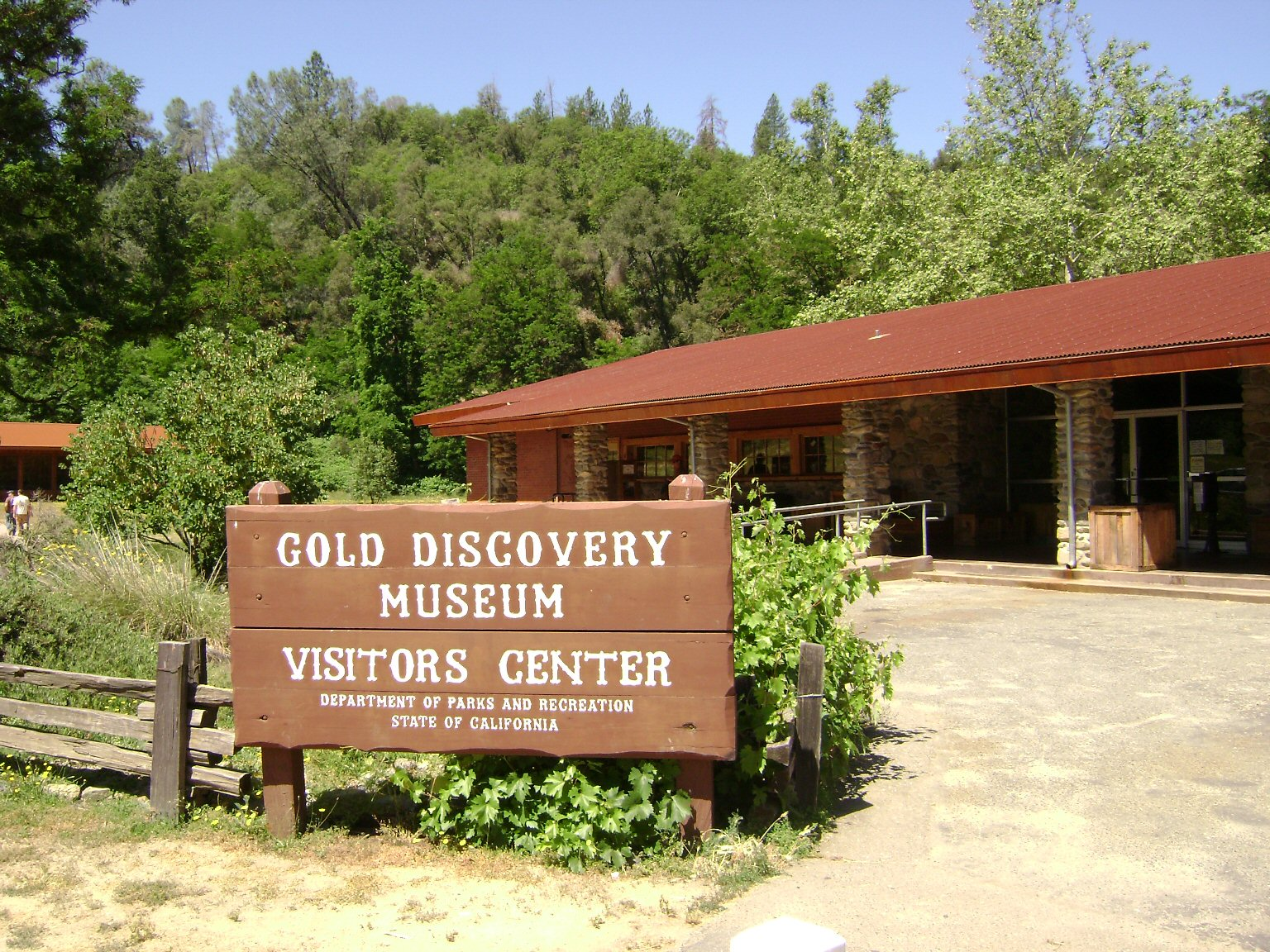
Park main entrance

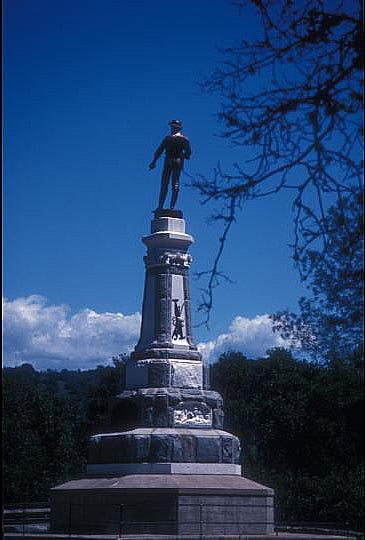
James W. Marshall monument

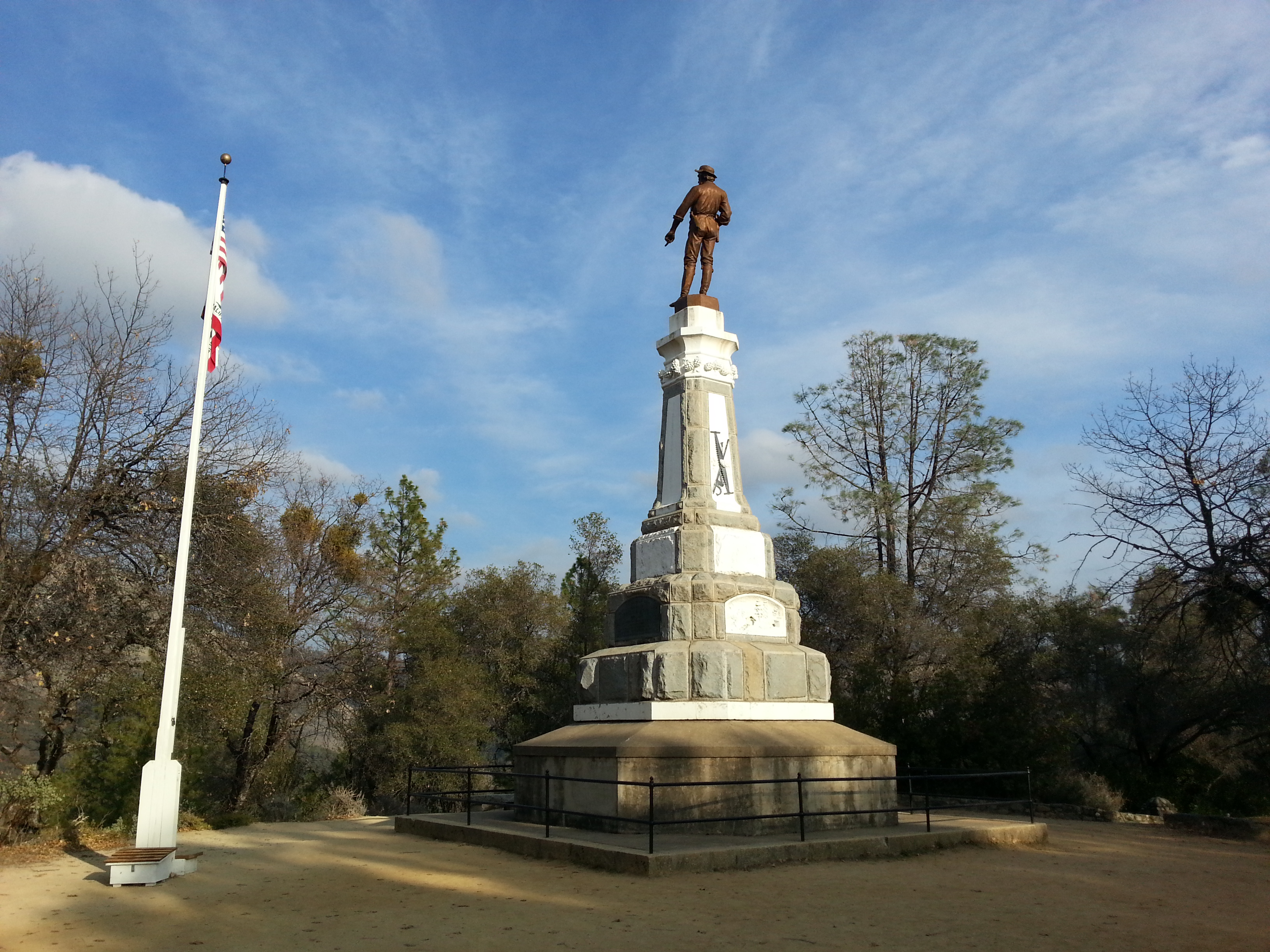
James W. Marshall monument

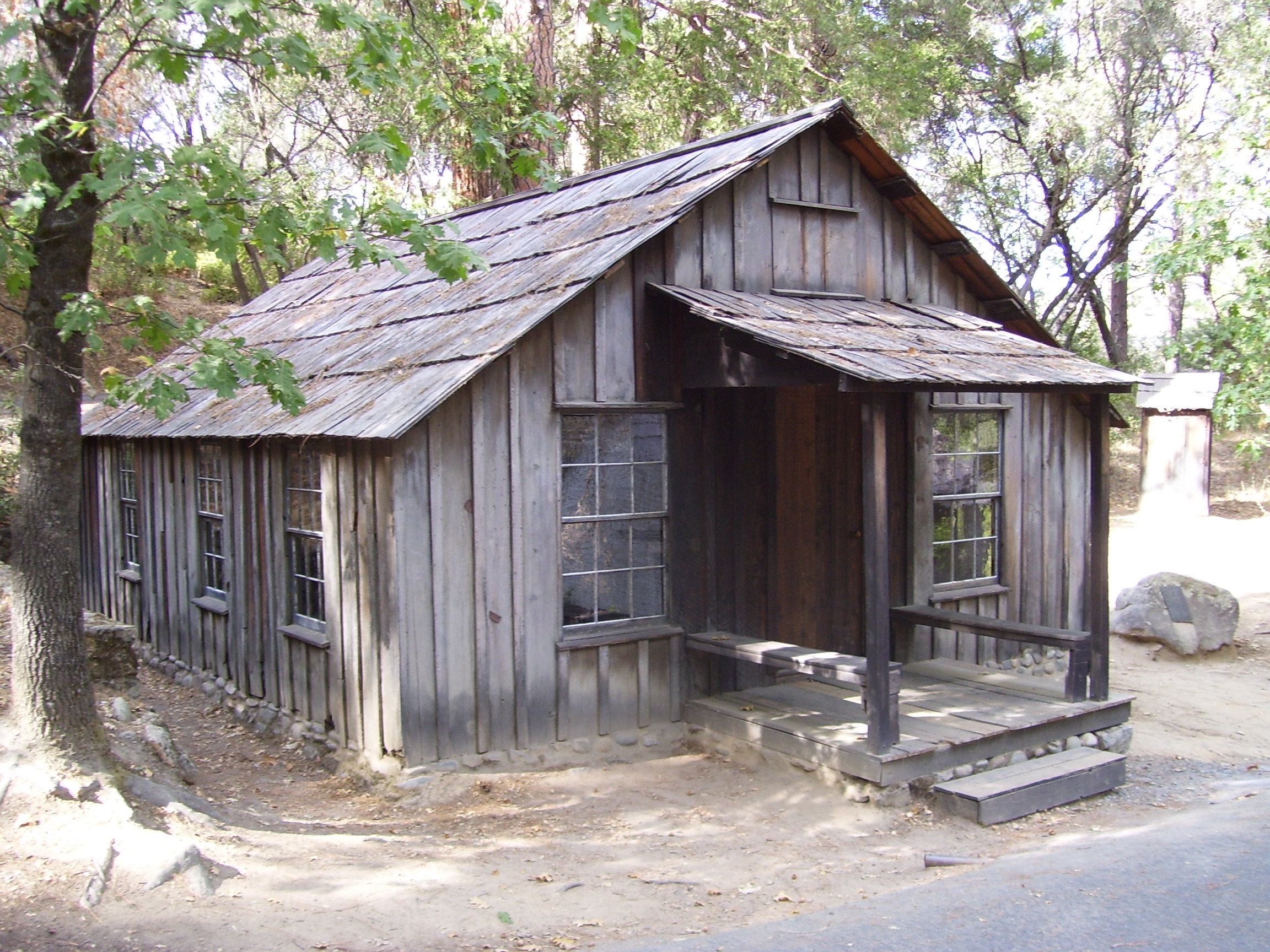
James Marshall cabin in Coloma

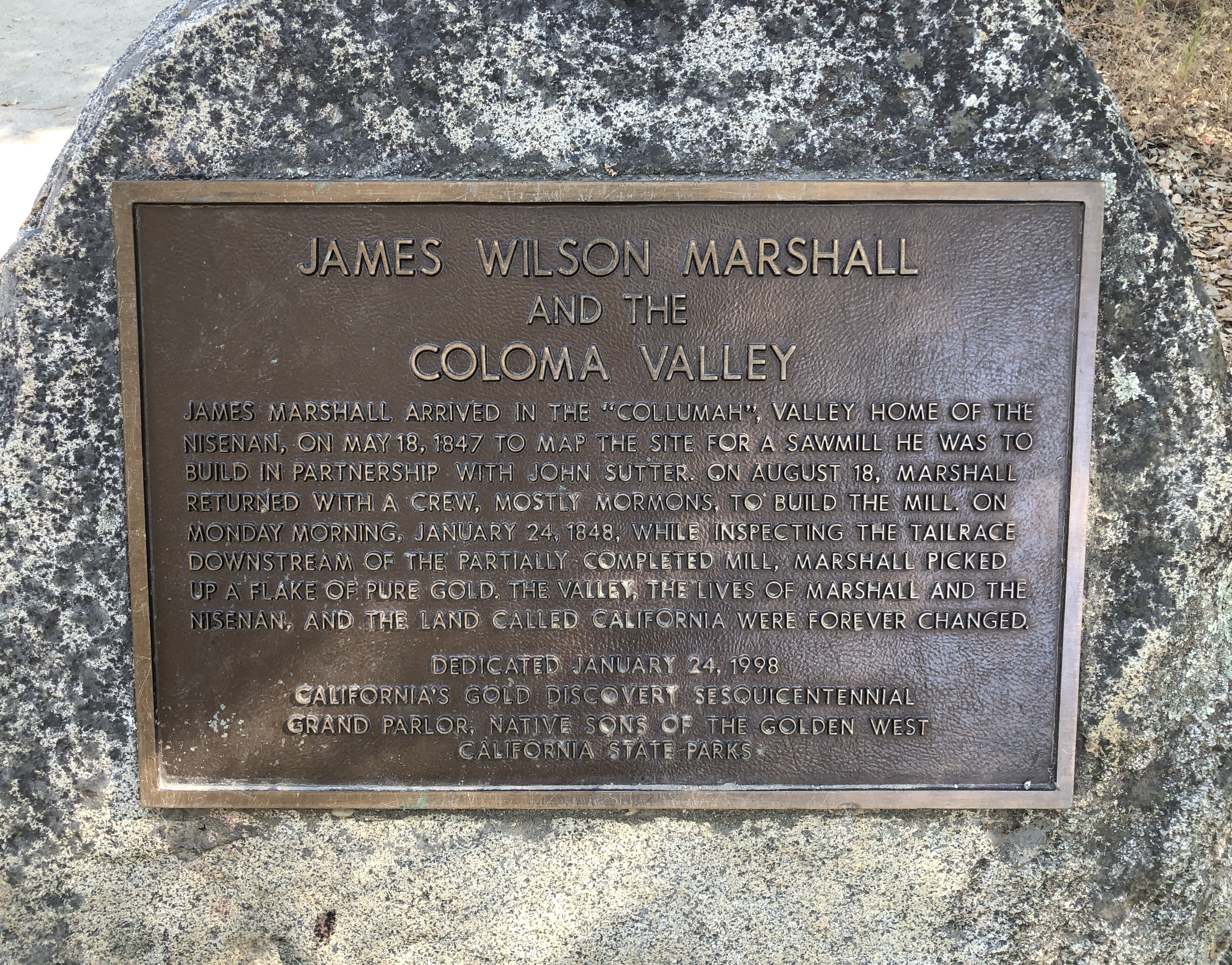
California Historical Landmark: Coloma Valley

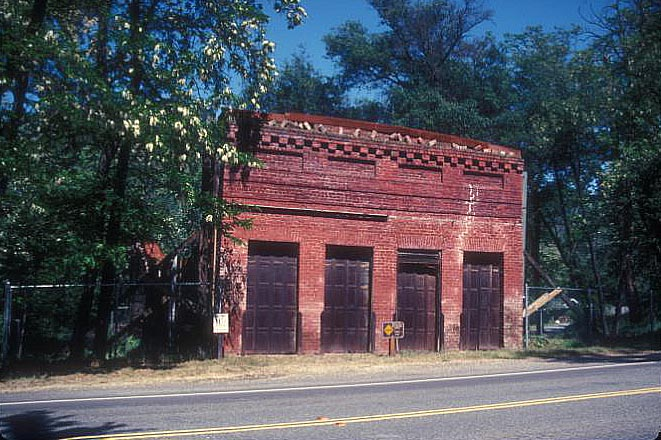
Robert Bell's store in Coloma

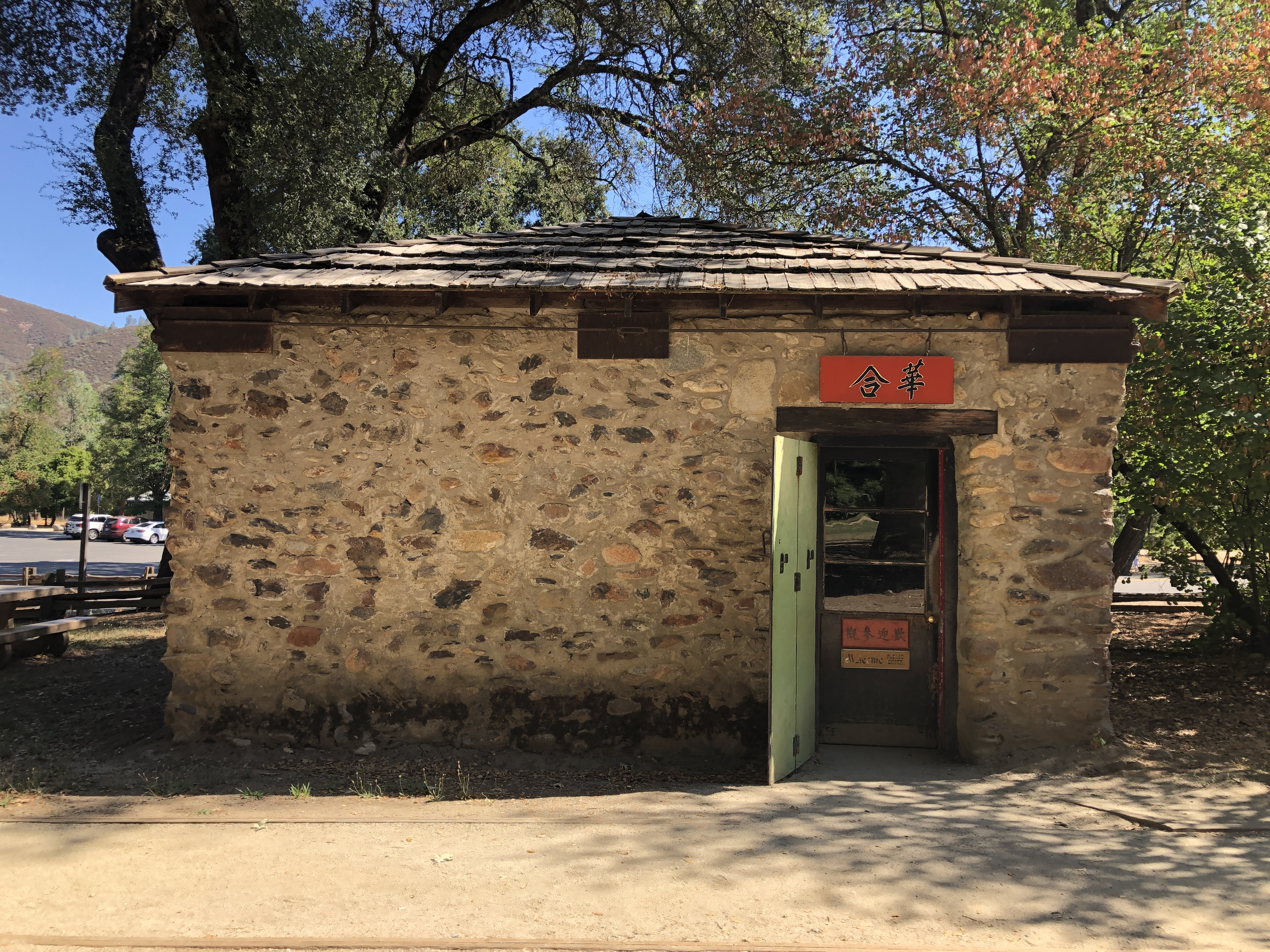
Wah Hop Store at Marshall Gold Discovery State Historic Park

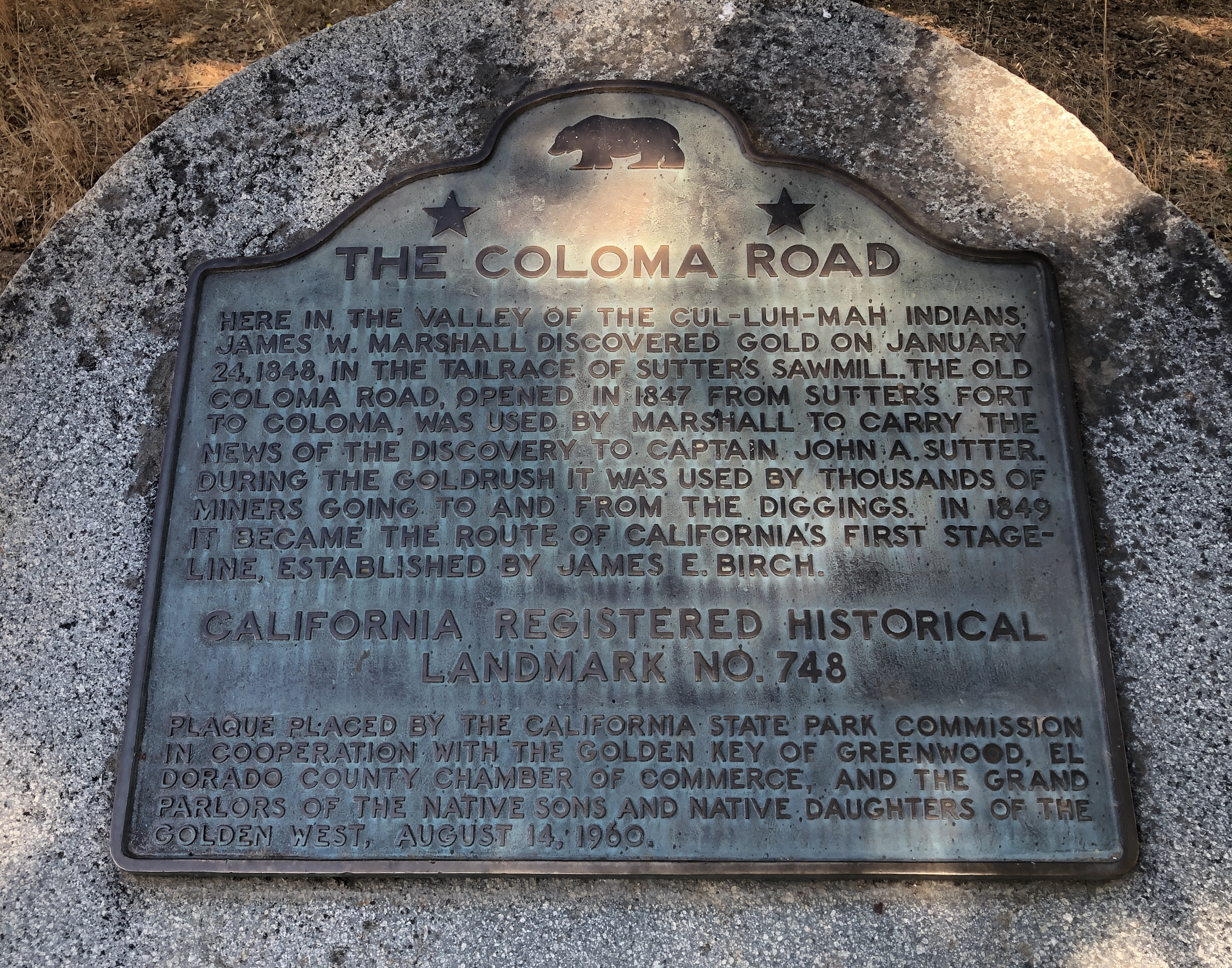
California Historical Landmark: Coloma Road

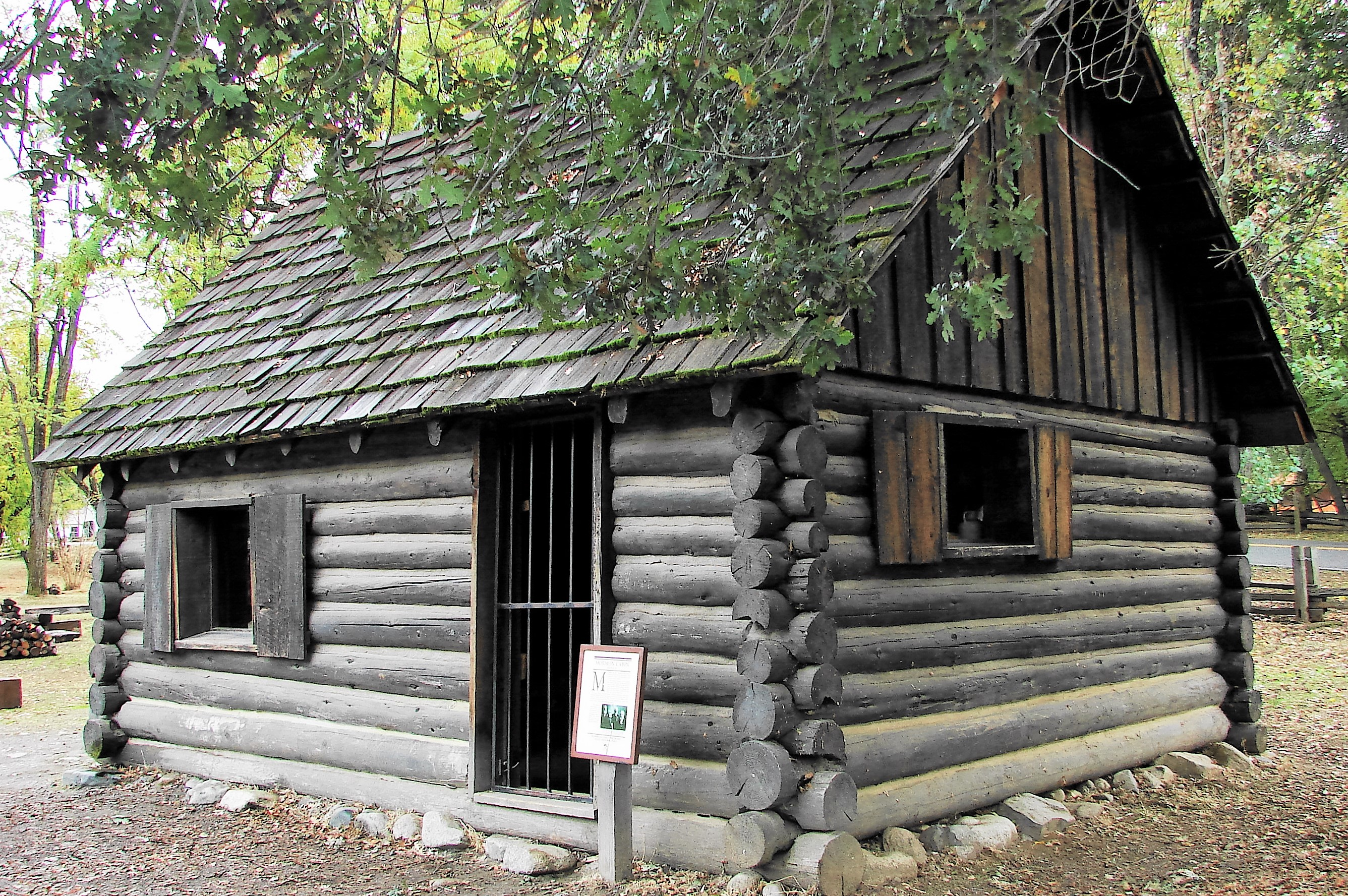
Mormon Workers Cabin at Sutter's Mill

== See also ==
- List of California state parks
- California Historical Landmarks in El Dorado County
- Marshall's Blacksmith Shop
