= Condemned Bar, California =

Condemned Bar
- Former settlement
- Location in California
- Coordinates: 39°19′46″N 121°11′48″W
- Country: United States
- State: California
- County: El Dorado

California Historical Landmark
- Reference no.: 572

Condemned Bar is a former settlement, in El Dorado County, California. It is in the Sierra Nevada foothills. The former town is now under Folsom Lake. A Historical Landmark marker was built at Folsom Lake State Recreation Area. The former mining town of the California Gold Rush is registered as California Historical Landmark #572.

== Negro Hill ==
Also at Folsom Lake State Recreation Area is California Historical Landmark #570, Negro Hill. Negro Hill, California, also called, Negro Flat, was a former historic mining town also under Folsom Lake, 38.698°N 121.1093°W. African-American miners worked the area from 1849 to 1852. At its peak in 1855, the town had a population of 400, of all races. The town had a boarding house and a church, but with the gold gone, the town was gone by 1870.

== See also ==
- California Historical Landmarks in El Dorado County
- List of flooded towns in the United States
- Mining communities of the California Gold Rush
