= Hangman's Tree =

Historical Landmark in Placerville, California, United States

- Building built over the Hangman's Tree

- Location within California Location within the United States
- 38.7282°N 120.8025°W
- Location: 305 Main St Placerville, California

History
- Built: 1849

California Historical Landmark
- Reference no.: 141

Hangman's Tree was a tree in Placerville, California. The site of the tree is a California Historical Landmark No. 141, in El Dorado County, California. The stump of the tree is now under the building at 305 Main Street. During the California Gold Rush, the city was called Dry Diggins after the gold mining camp, but was known as Hangtown, as vigilantes ("Judge Lynch") hung many men for different types of crimes. During the Gold Rush, the site was Elstner's Hay Yard, next to the Jackass Inn. Hangtown was later renamed Placerville.

Old Dry Higgins-Old gold mining camp in Hangtown is a California Historical Landmark No. 475.

Overland Pony Express Route in Placerville is a California Historical Landmark No. 701.

Studebaker's Shop in Placerville is a California Historical Landmark No. 142.

== See also ==
- List of California state parks
- California Historical Landmarks in El Dorado County
