= Site of California's First Grange Hall =

Coordinates: 38°50′38.12″N 121°0′53.94″W

Pilot Hill Grange No. 1
- Location: On State Hwy 49 (P.M. 31.3), 0.2 mi N of Pilot Hill, El Dorado County, California

California Historical Landmark
- Reference no.: 551

The Site of California's First Grange Hall, also known as Pilot Hill Grange Hall No. 1, is a historic site that has been designated a California Historical Landmark. The organization was founded in 1870; the building was completed in 1889.

It is California Historical Landmark number 551 (Located at 1701 State Hwy 193, in the town of Cool, 95614, it was relocated in the 1930s when a family donated land in Cool. Before that time, it was next to the Bayley House located in Pilot Hill, four miles south of Cool.).

The approximate location is .

== See also ==
- List of California Historical Landmarks
