= Coloma Road, Rescue =

Historical Landmark in Rescue, California, United States

Coloma Road in Rescue California
- Location within California Location within the United States
- 38.7111°N 120.9520°W
- Location: 4222 Green Valley Rd, Rescue, California

History
- Built: 1847

California Historical Landmark
- Reference no.: 747

Coloma Road in Rescue, California is a historical road in El Dorado County, California. The old Coloma Road opened in 1847, running from Sutter's Fort to the city of Coloma. During the California Gold Rush, thousands of miners traveled the road heading out to look for gold and claims. James W. Marshall traveled the road to tell of his gold find to John Sutter. California's first stage line, California Stage Company, traveled the road starting in 1849. The line was founded by James E. Birch.

California Historical Landmark No. 747 is located at 4222 Green Valley Road in Rescue, California at the Rescue Junction General Store. There is a second Coloma Road Historical Landmark Marker, No. 748. The No. 748 marker is in the Marshall Gold Discovery State Historic Park's Gold Discovery parking area at 38.8023°N 120.8927°W.

== See also ==
- List of California state parks
- California Historical Landmarks in El Dorado County
