= Higgins Point, California =

Former mining settlement in El Dorado County, California

Higgins Point
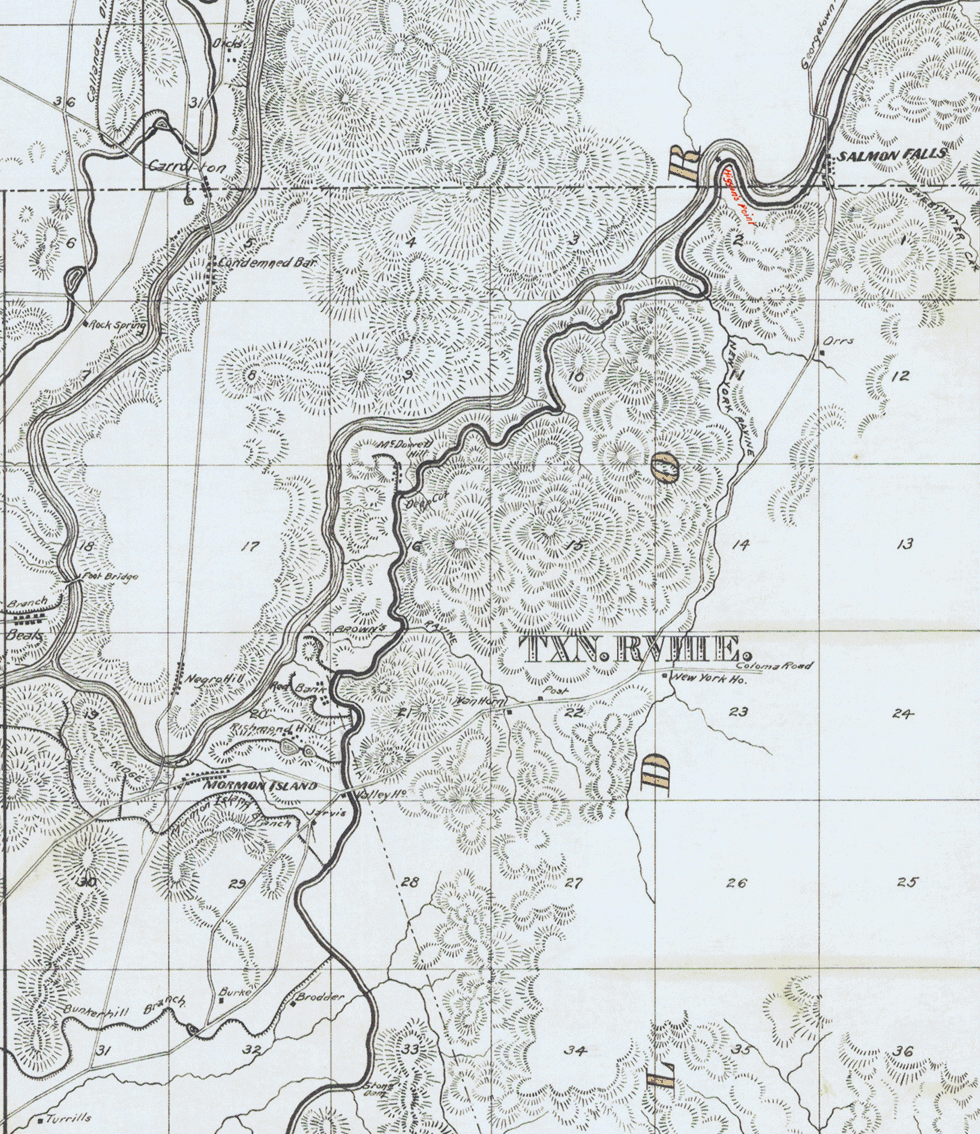
- Map with Higgins Point in red text.
- Interactive map of Higgins Point
- 38.7545°N 121.0694°W
- Location: El Dorado County, California

Higgins Point is a former mining camp in El Dorado County, California, United States. It was located one-half mile west of the center of Salmon Falls. The place was named for the first person to open a store there, an Australian named Higgins. Rich diggings of gold were discovered by Mormons at Higgins Point in 1849. Higgins Point was the first part of Salmon Falls to be laid out as a town, starting in 1853.
