= Pleasant Grove House =

Historical landmark in Rescue, California, United States

Pleasant Grove House Pony Express Station
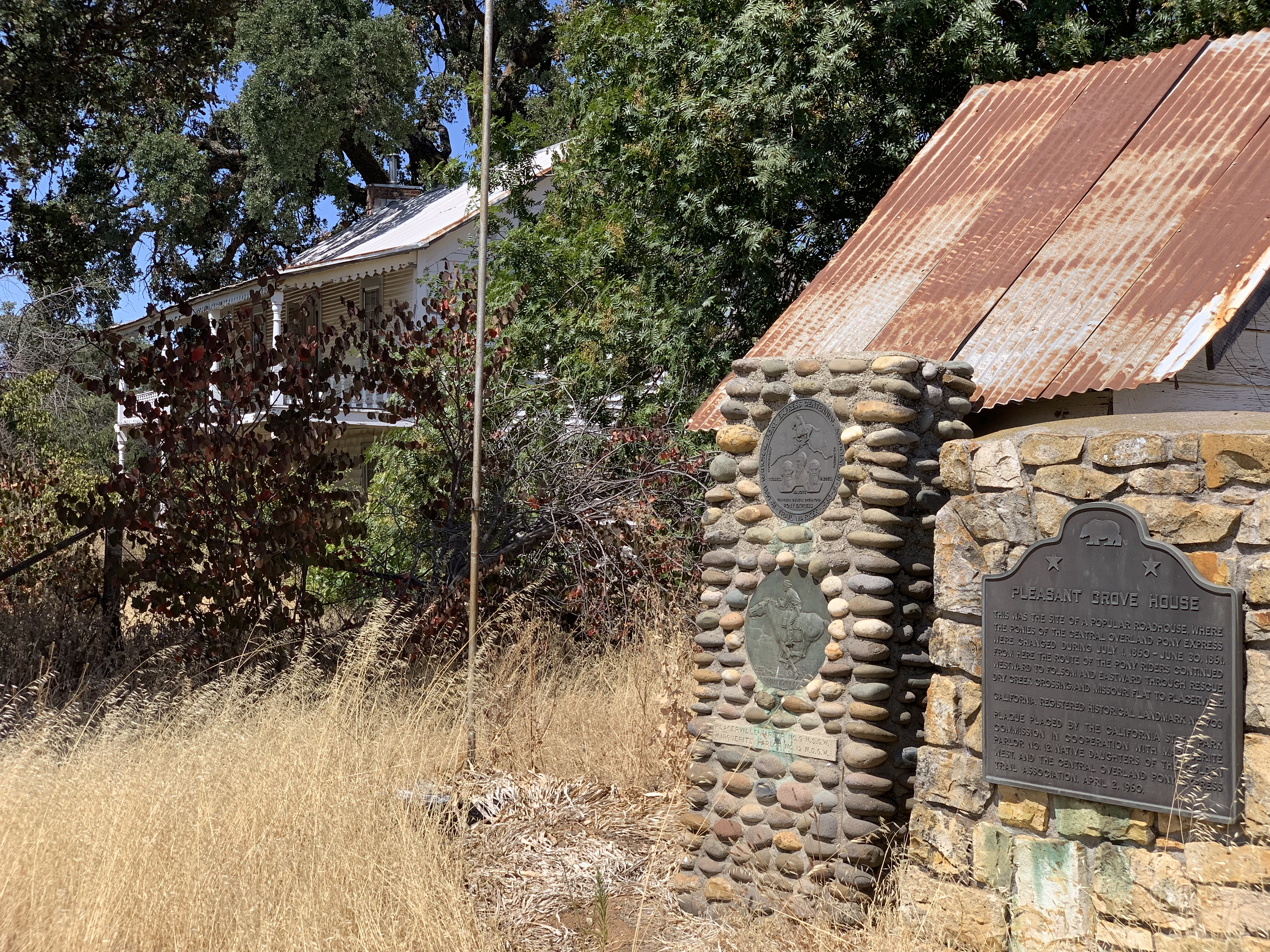
- Pleasant Grove House Pony Express Station

- Location within California Location within the United States
- 38.697°N 121.020°W
- Location: 2459 Green Valley Road, Rescue, California

History
- Built: 1850

California Historical Landmark
- Reference no.: 703

Pleasant Grove House Pony Express Station is a historical building in Rescue, California built in 1850. The site of the Pleasant Grove House Pony Express Station is a California Historical Landmark No. 703. The historical building was built to house California Gold Rush 49 miners traveling to find gold and stake a claim. The Pleasant Grove House Pony Express Station in El Dorado County, California. At the Pleasant Grove House Pony Express Station, Pony Express riders would change horses. The Pleasant Grove House Pony Express Station was used for the Central Overland California and Pikes Peak Express Company's Pony Express Service from July 1, 1860, to June 30, 1861. From the Pleasant Grove House Pony Express Station, the riders heading west would go to Folsom. Riders heading east rode to Placerville traveling through the Rescue, Dry Creek Crossing, and Missouri Flat.

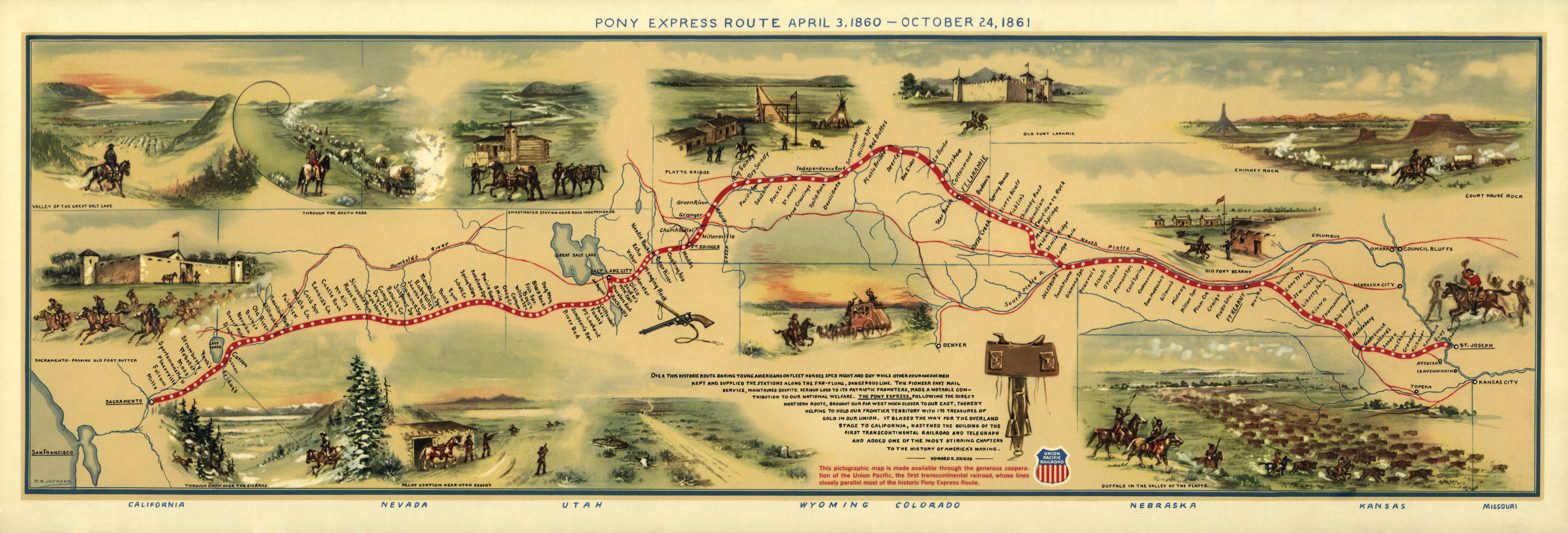
Illustrated Map of Pony Express Route in 1860 by William Henry Jackson ~ Courtesy the Library of Congress ~ The Pony Express mail route, April 3, 1860 – October 24, 1861; reproduction of Jackson illustration issued to commemorate the 100th anniversary of Pony Express founding on April 3, 1960. Reproduction of Jackson's map issued by the Union Pacific Railroad Company.

== See also ==
- California Historical Landmarks in El Dorado County
- Coloma Road, Rescue
