= Long Valley, California =

Long Valley, California refers to two locations:

- Long Valley Caldera, a depression in eastern California adjacent to Mammoth Mountain
- Long Valley, California, former name of Greenwood, El Dorado County, California
