= Alabaster Cave =

Cave in California

Coordinates: 38°48′43″N 121°4′32″W

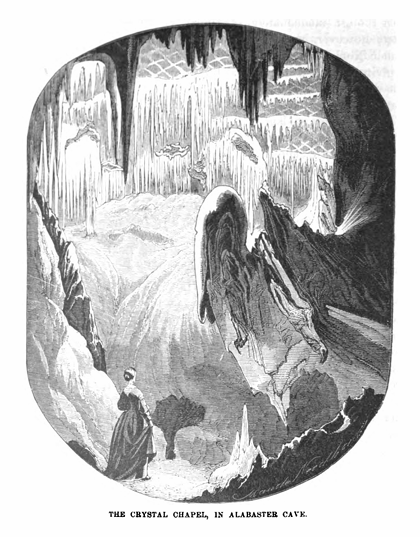
The Christal Chapel in Alabaster Cave

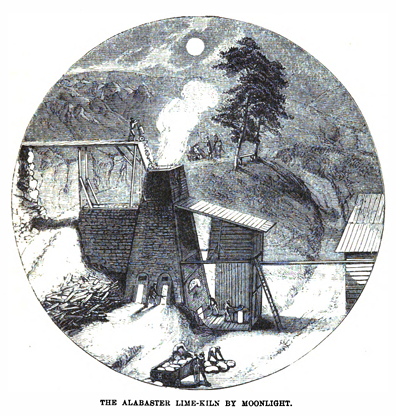
The Alabaster Mine Kiln by moonlight

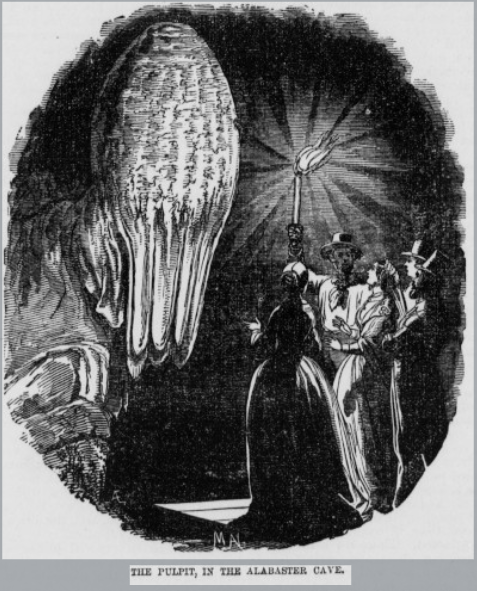
"Pulpit" in Alabaster Cave

Alabaster Cave is a cave in California, United States, located in El Dorado County near Pilot Hill, specifically by Kelly Ravine.

It was discovered in 1860 by William Gwynn. His workers, who were excavating at an established quarry site, uncovered the cave accidentally. The cave was fairly large, containing multiple rooms and chambers of over 200 ft (60 m) in length. It became a popular tourist attraction almost immediately due to its magnificent colors. The main attraction was a large chamber containing a "pulpit".

The remains are currently on private land which is strictly managed. The original entrance has since collapsed, and the cave has not been opened to the public since. Some sources even state that the entire cave was lost. No recent documentation of the cave does support the claim.
