= Methodist Episcopal Church (Placerville, California) =

Historical Landmark in Placerville, California, United States

- Location within California Location within the United States
- 38.728°N 120.794°W
- Location: 1031 Thompson Way, Placerville, California

History
- Built: 1872

California Historical Landmark
- Designated: November 3, 1961
- Reference no.: 767

Methodist Episcopal Church in Placerville, California is a California Historical Landmark No. 767. The Methodist Episcopal Church was built in 1851 in El Dorado County, California. Methodist Episcopal Church is the oldest church building in El Dorado County. The Church building was moved to its current location from its original site on the corner of Cedar Ravine and Main Street, Placerville 38.7287°N 120.796°W. The roof support beams were hand-made from local ponderosa pine trees. Methodist Episcopal Church's first bell tower bell was purchased from the sailing ship Staffordshire. A historical marker was placed and dedicated by the El Dorado County Chamber of Commerce in 1961 and re-dedicated in 1996.

The Staffordshire was a sail ship built in 1851 by Donald McKay. The clipper packet ship was built in East Boston, Massachusetts. Staffordshire was 230 feet long, with a beam of 41 feet and a draft of 29 feet. at 1,817 tons. She sank on December 29, 1853 after hitting a rock at Blonde Rock at Seal Island, Nova Scotia

== See also ==
- List of California state parks
- California Historical Landmarks in El Dorado County
