= Birch, Nevada =

- Ghost town
- Location within Nevada Location within the United States
- Country: United States
- State: Nevada
- County: Eureka
- Named for: James E. Birch
- Elevation: 5,866 ft (1,788 m)

Birch is a ghost town in Eureka County, in the U.S. state of Nevada. Birch is located to the west of the Diamond Mountains, 26 miles northeast of Eureka.

== History ==
The community was named after James E. Birch, a stagecoach line entrepreneur. A post office was established at Birch in 1901, and remained in operation until 1926. In 1941, Birch had 15 inhabitants.

In 2016, Birch consisted of only a few collapsed buildings.
