= Gold Hill, El Dorado County, California =

Unincorporated community in California, United States

Gold Hill
- Unincorporated community
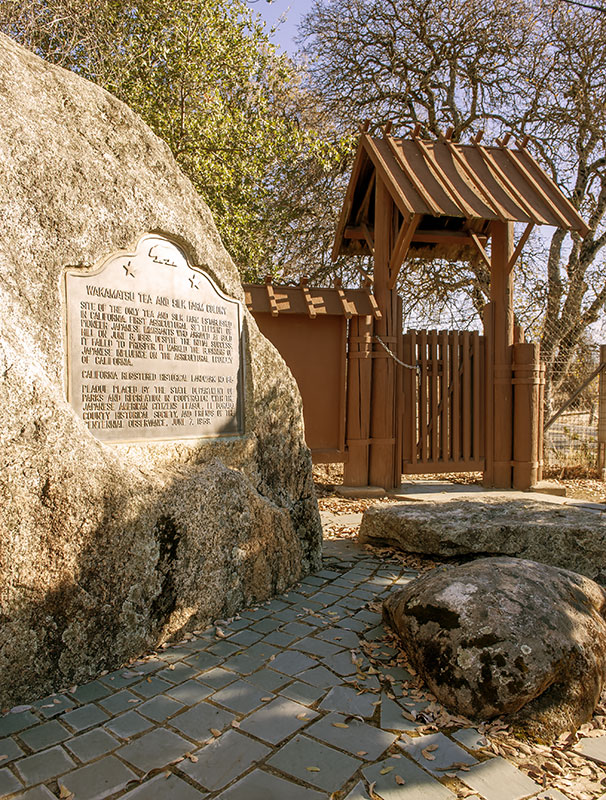
- Wakamatsu Tea and Silk Farm Colony

- Location in California Gold Hill (the United States)
- Coordinates: 38°45′40″N 120°53′05″W
- Country: United States
- State: California
- County: El Dorado
- Elevation: 1,621 ft (494 m)

Gold Hill (formerly Granite Hill) is an unincorporated community in El Dorado County, California, United States. It is located 2.5 miles (4.0 km) south of Coloma, at an elevation of 1621 feet (494 m).

Originally a mining district, Gold Hill became an important farming region once a canal was dug to the area from Hangtown Creek, near Placerville. Fruit from the Gold Hill area was distributed throughout the United States in the 1800s, and the district was also the site of a short-lived colony of Japanese settlers, who raised tea and mulberry plants for the production of silk. A few scattered farms remain today.
