= Rescue, California =

Unincorporated community in California, United States

Rescue
- Unincorporated community
- Location in California Rescue (the United States)
- Coordinates: 38°42′42″N 120°57′05″W
- Country: United States
- State: California
- County: El Dorado
- Elevation: 1,210 ft (370 m)

Rescue is an unincorporated community in El Dorado County, California, United States. It is located north-northwest of Shingle Springs and north-northeast of Cameron Park. The zip code is 95672, and Rescue is located in area code 530. The town lies at an elevation of 1214 feet (370 m).

== Locale ==
Rescue consists of primarily farmland, vineyards are a part of the Sierra Foothills AVA and ranches with an expanding amount of residential neighborhoods and businesses. Neighborhoods vary from tightly knit semi-suburban areas to more rural, spread out neighborhoods. Downtown Rescue is quite small, with only a post office, Fire Station, two churches, and a Community Center to distinguish it from the more rural areas. A restaurant operated in the former quarters of a longtime business known as Rescue Store which also sold gasoline, but has been closed for a few years.

== History ==
The town of Rescue was established in 1895. The story goes that Andrew Hare was "rescued" from poverty by his mining, and named the town Rescue. The town was once a stop on the Pony Express trail between Placerville and Folsom.

== Education ==
Rescue is served by the Rescue Union School District at the primary and middle school level. At the high school level, it is served by the El Dorado Union High School District, mainly at the Ponderosa High School campus.

== Geography ==
Pine Hill Ecological Reserve is located in Rescue. The Reserve is one unit of the much larger Pine Hill Preserve system that consists of five separate units of varying size that total more than 4,000 acres (16 km2) and protects eight rare plants and their gabbro soil habitat.

== See also ==
- Pleasant Grove House
- Coloma Road, Rescue
- Green Springs Ranch
- California Historical Landmarks in El Dorado County
