= Salmon Falls, California =

Salmon Falls
- Former settlement
- Location in California Salmon Falls (the United States)
- Coordinates: 38°45′29″N 121°03′30″W
- Country: United States
- State: California
- County: El Dorado
- Elevation: 469 ft (143 m)

California Historical Landmark
- Reference no.: 571

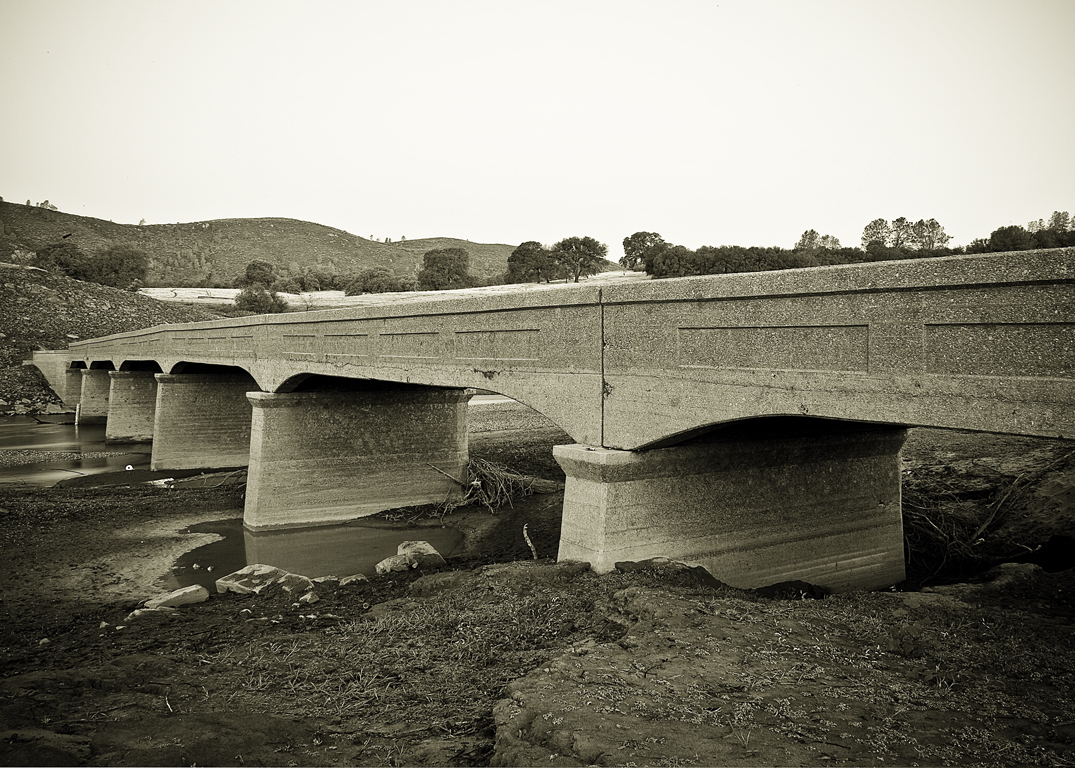
Salmon Falls Bridge at Dawn (2007)

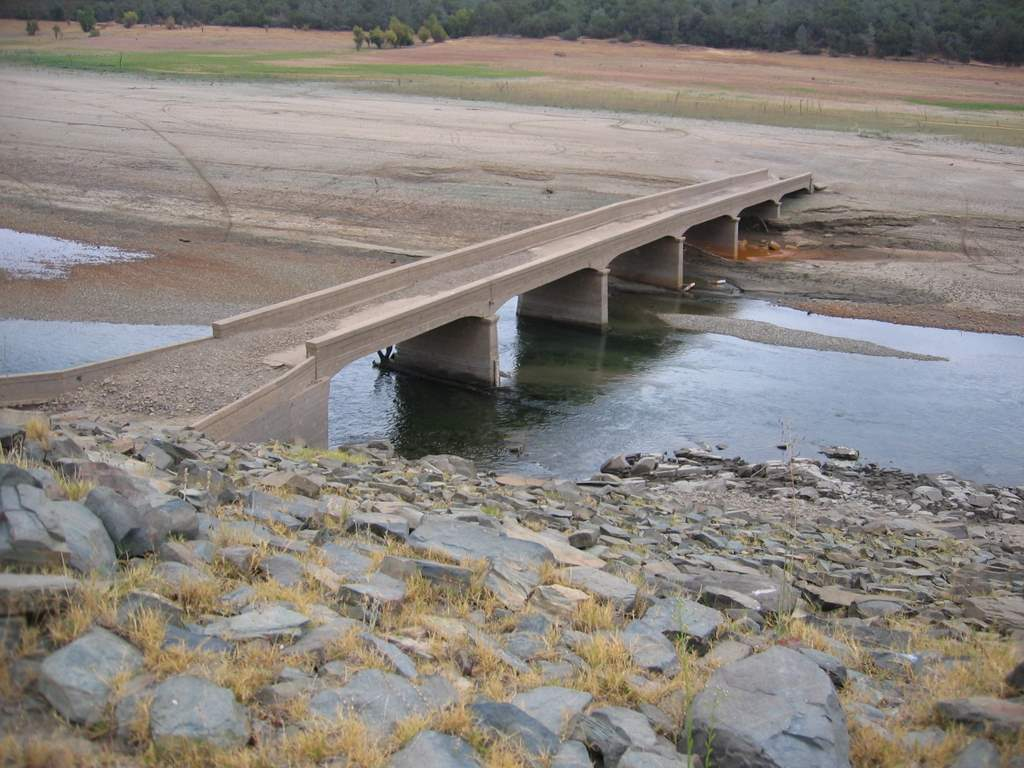
Old Salmon Falls Bridge (2007)

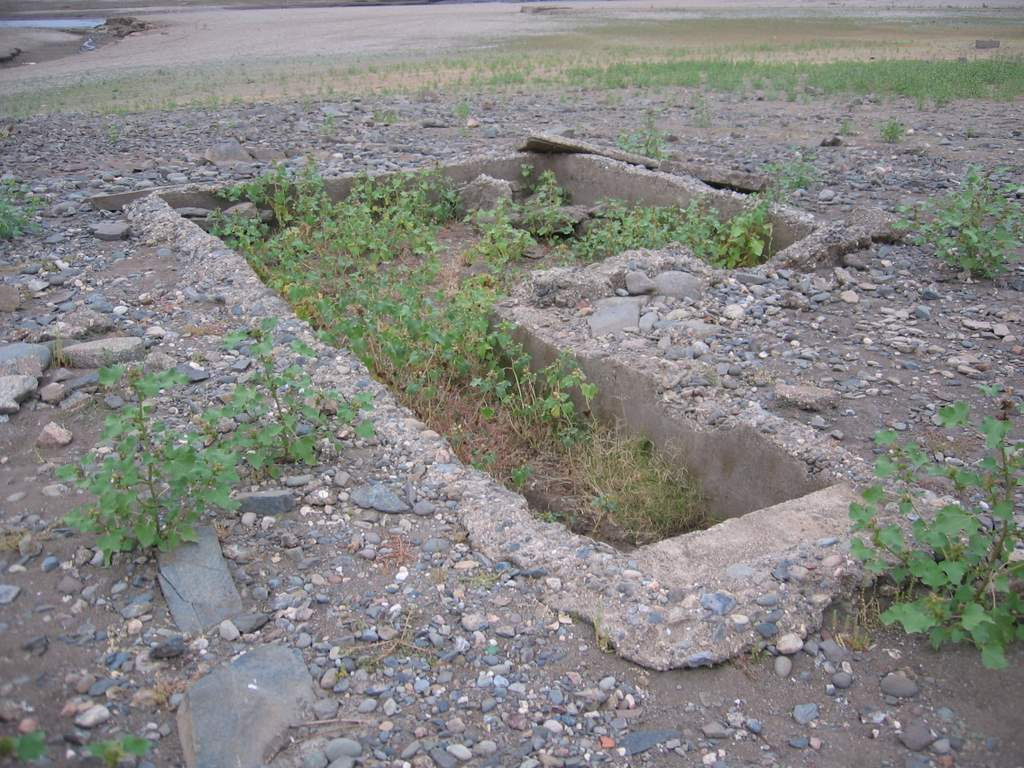
Old foundation at Salmon Falls (2007)

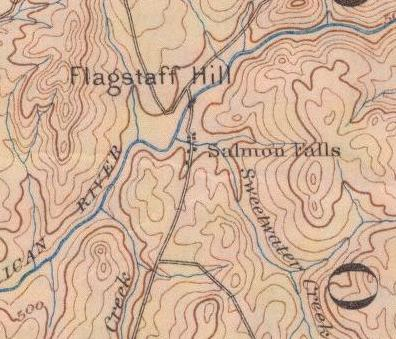
USGS Map of Salmon Falls (1892)

Salmon Falls is a former settlement in El Dorado County, California, United States. It was located on the South Fork of the American River, 5.5 miles (9 km) south-southwest of Pilot Hill, at an elevation of 469 feet (143 m). It was flooded by Folsom Lake. Nearby were waterfalls from which the place got its name. The site is now registered as California Historical Landmark #571.

== Overview ==
Mining began at Salmon Falls in 1848, and the town was founded in 1850. Laying out of the town began at Higgins Point in 1853. The post office arrived in 1851, and remained in operation until 1912, with closures during parts of 1875 and 1893. The population peaked at 3003 during the gold years.

Salmon Falls, California was an old mining town established along the banks of the American River at the mouth of Sweetwater Creek (northeast of present-day Folsom, California). Since the construction of Folsom Dam in the 1950s (which created Folsom Lake) Salmon Falls is typically immersed in water throughout much of the year. However, at low-water levels old foundations, roads, and the old Salmon Falls Bridge are easily accessible.

Remains from the local cemetery were exhumed and relocated along with remains from other town sites that were inundated by Folsom Lake after Folsom Dam was built (see Mormon Island).
