= Mormon Tavern, California =

Former rest stop in El Dorado County, California

Coordinates: 38.6562°N 121.0595°W

Mormon Tavern is a former hotel, saloon and stage stop in El Dorado County, California. It was located on the emigrant road 0.5 miles (0.80 km) west of Clarksville.

The place was founded in 1848 or 49 by a mormon named Morgan. It served as a stop on the Pony Express from 1860 to 1861. There is no certain account of how the place got its name, which is quite incongruous: Mormons (Latter Day Saints) typically don't drink alcohol (as would be served in a tavern).

The site is now registered as California Historical Landmark #699.
