= Sutter's Mill =

Location of gold discovery that started the California gold rush in 1848

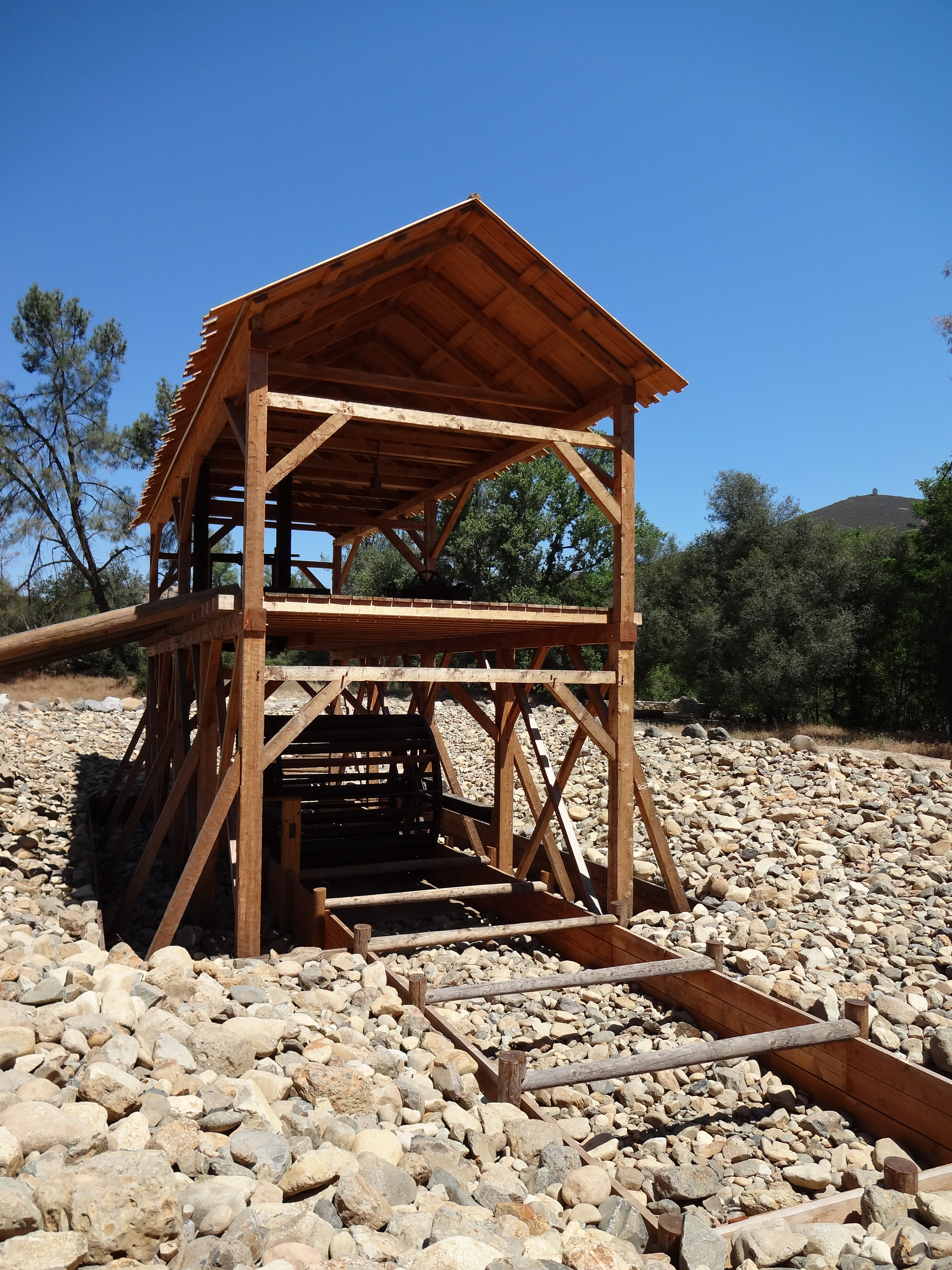
- 2014 replica of Sutter's Mill

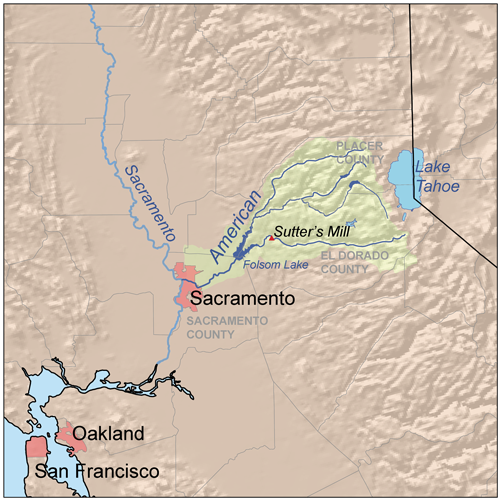
- Location of Sutter's Mill
- 38°48′12.5″N 120°53′32.5″W
- Location: Coloma, California

Site notes
- Area: Marshall Gold Discovery State Historic Park
- Governing body: California Department of Parks and Recreation

California Historical Landmark
- Official name: Gold discovery site
- Designated: March 7, 1955
- Reference no.: 530

Sutter's Mill was a water-powered sawmill on the bank of the South Fork American River in the foothills of the Sierra Nevada in California. It was named after its owner John Sutter. A worker constructing the mill, James W. Marshall, found gold there in 1848. This discovery set off the California gold rush (1848–1855), a major event in the history of the United States.

The mill was later reconstructed in the original design and today forms part of Marshall Gold Discovery State Historic Park in Coloma, California. A meteorite fell in 2012 and landed close to the mill; fragments were recovered and it was named the Sutter's Mill meteorite.

== History ==
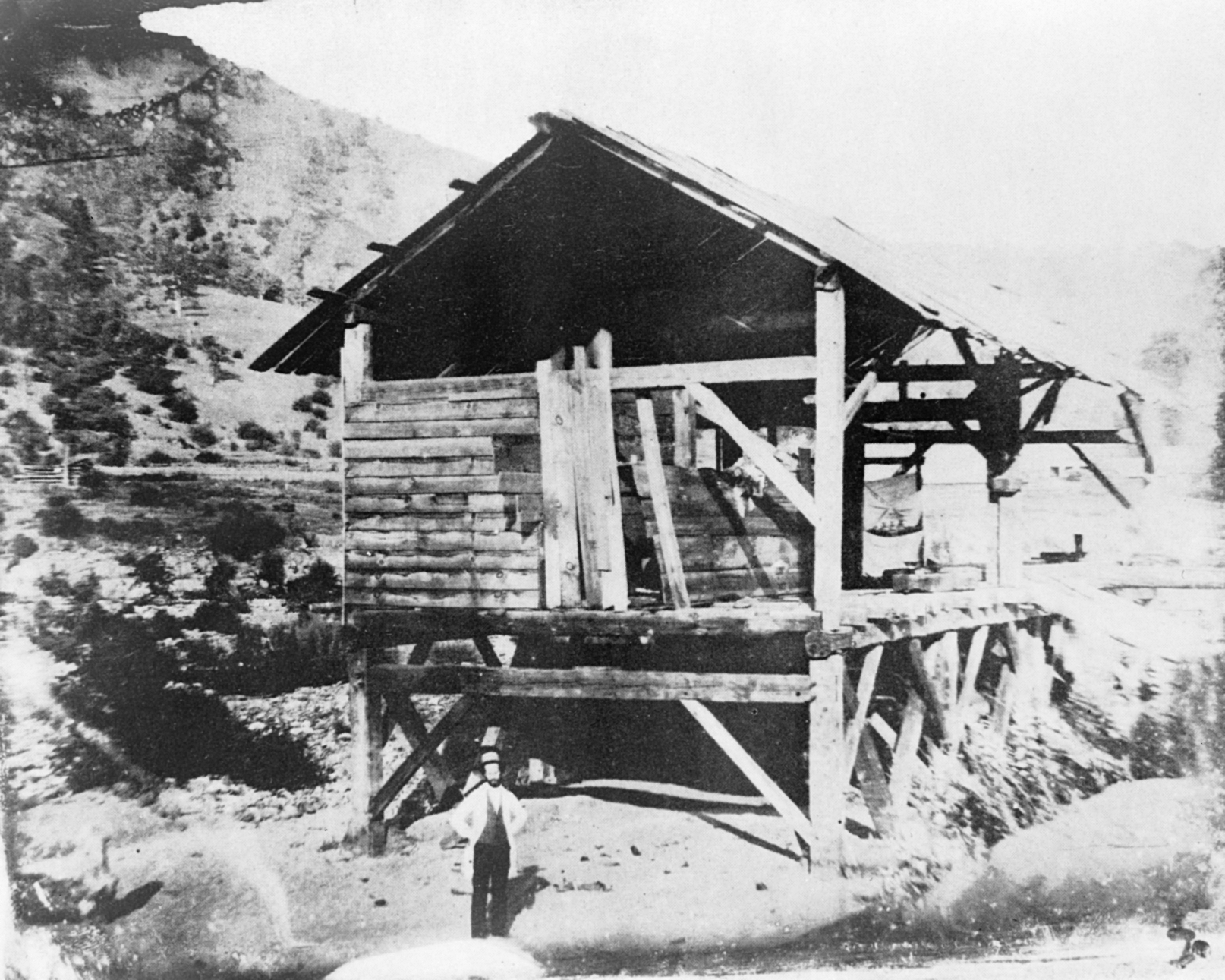
Photograph of the original Sutter's Mill, taken c. 1850

The territory of Alta California, which includes modern-day California, was settled by the Viceroyalty of New Spain from 1683 onwards. It became part of an independent Mexico in 1821. John Sutter, a German-Swiss settler, arrived in the region in 1839. He established a colony at New Helvetia (now part of Sacramento), in the Central Valley. The United States conquered the region during the Mexican–American War (1846–1848): California was overrun by US forces in 1846 and a ceasefire in the region was agreed in January 1847. A peace treaty for the wider war had not yet been completed when Sutter decided to begin construction of a sawmill in the forest about 30 miles northeast of his existing colony. Sutter employed James Wilson Marshall, a carpenter originally from New Jersey, to supervise construction of the new building.

On January 24, 1848, while working on construction of the mill, Marshall found flakes of gold in the South Fork American River. On February 2, 1848, before news of the discovery had arrived, the Treaty of Guadalupe Hidalgo was signed in Mexico City. This peace treaty formally transferred sovereignty over the region to the United States. Two workers at the mill, Henry Bigler and Azariah Smith, were veterans of the Mormon Battalion and recorded their experience in journals. Bigler recorded the date when gold was discovered, January 24, 1848, in his diary. Sutter's claim to the US government for mineral rights was investigated by Joseph Libbey Folsom, who issued confirmation of the gold discovery in June. The first flake found by Marshall was shipped to President James K. Polk in Washington D.C., arriving in August 1848. It is now on display in the National Museum of American History, part of the Smithsonian Institution.

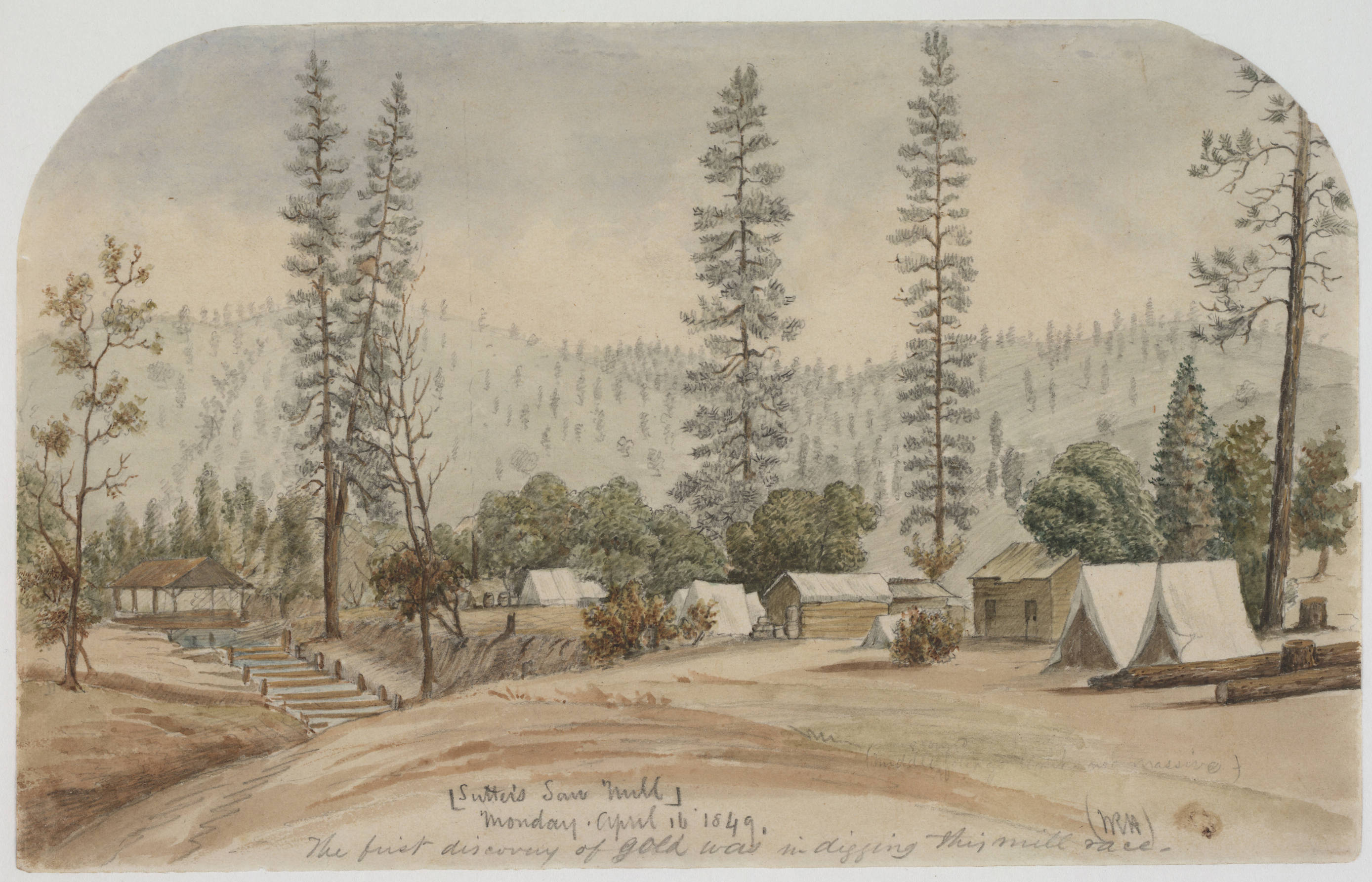
Sutter's Mill, as drawn by William Rich Hutton in April 1849

As news of the gold spread, settlers flocked to the new US territory of California. The population expanded from 14,000 non-natives in 1848 to 224,000 in 1852. There were over 80,000 newcomers in 1849 and another 91,000 in 1850. Many settled at the new town of Coloma, California, which sprang up close to Sutter's Mill. Numerous further discoveries of gold in California were made. During the next seven years, approximately 300,000 people came to California (half by land and half by sea) to seek their fortunes from either mining for gold or selling supplies to the prospectors. This California gold rush permanently changed the territory, both through mass immigration and the economic effects of the gold. California became a US state in 1850.

Indians fled Sutter's Mill, leaving no one to harvest wheat. Miners plundered his livestock and stole his millstones, and Sutter went bankrupt.

== Current status ==
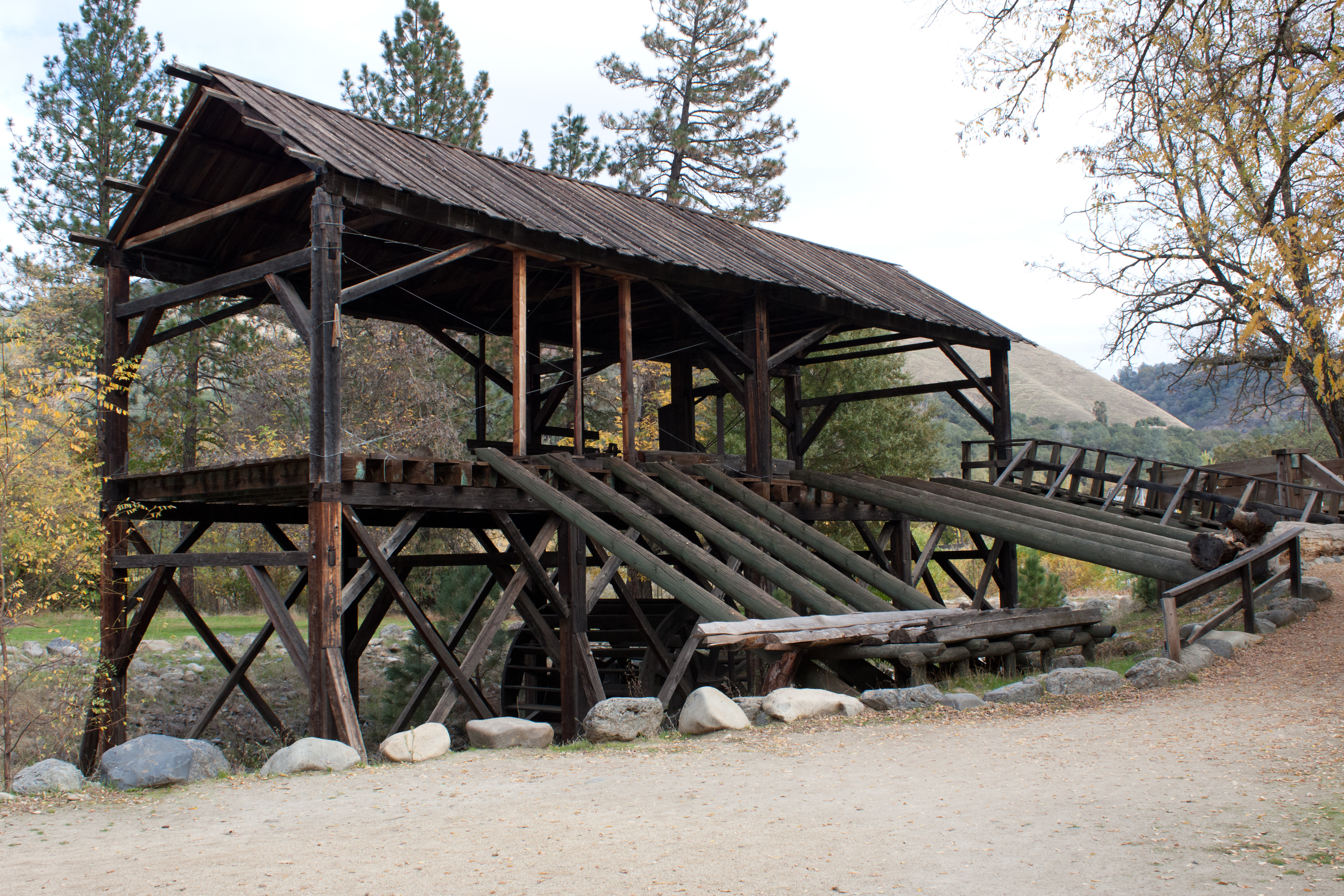
Replica (1968–2014)

The site of the mill is part of the Marshall Gold Discovery State Historic Park, registered as California Historical Landmark number 530.

On September 8, 1965, a groundbreaking was held to begin the construction of a replica of the original structure, based on Marshall's own drawings and a photograph of the mill taken circa 1850. The replica was nearly completed by the following year, and while not built at the exact spot as the original, it was designed to be moved there if the river returned to its 1848 stream bed. The newly completed replica was officially dedicated on January 21, 1968. In 2014, the 1960s structure was replaced with a new replica, built closer to the original site.

== Meteorite ==
On April 22, 2012 a meteor entered the Earth's atmosphere and exploded, showering meteorite fragments over parts of California and Nevada. The first samples of this meteorite fall were recovered close to Sutter's Mill, so it was named the Sutter's Mill meteorite. Several dozen fragments were eventually identified, with a total weight of about a kilogram(≈2.2 pounds). The meteorite is classified as a carbonaceous chondrite and contains some of the oldest known material in the Solar System.

== See also ==
- California gold coinage
- Sutter's Fort
