= El Dorado, California =

Unincorporated community in California, United States

El Dorado
- Unincorporated community
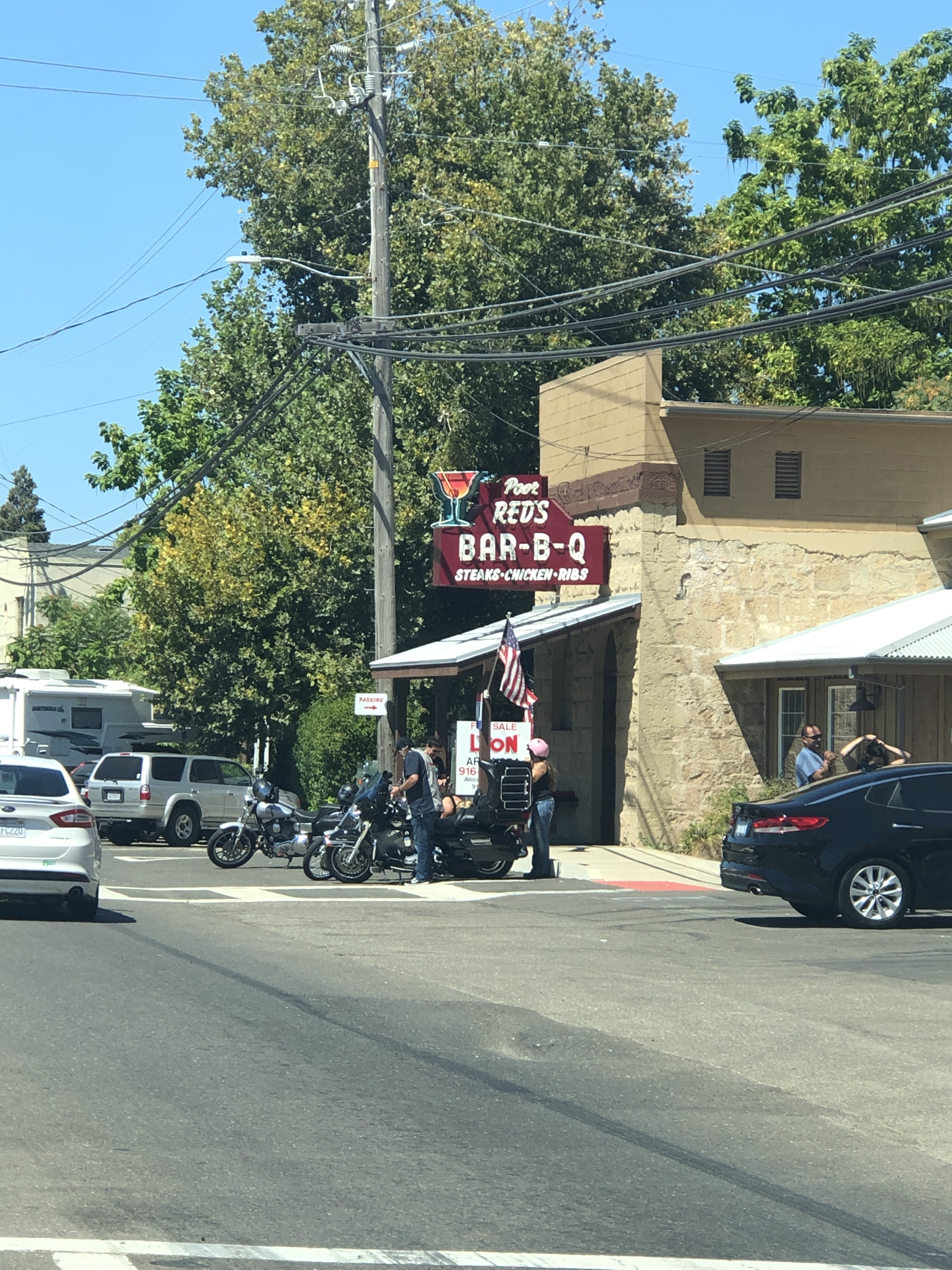
- Poor Red's Bar-B-Q in downtown El Dorado

- Location in California El Dorado (the United States)
- Coordinates: 38°40′58″N 120°50′52″W
- Country: United States
- State: California
- County: El Dorado
- Elevation: 1,610 ft (490 m)

California Historical Landmark
- Official name: El Dorado, California
- Reference no.: 486

California Historical Landmark
- Official name: El Dorado-Nevada House
- Reference no.: 700

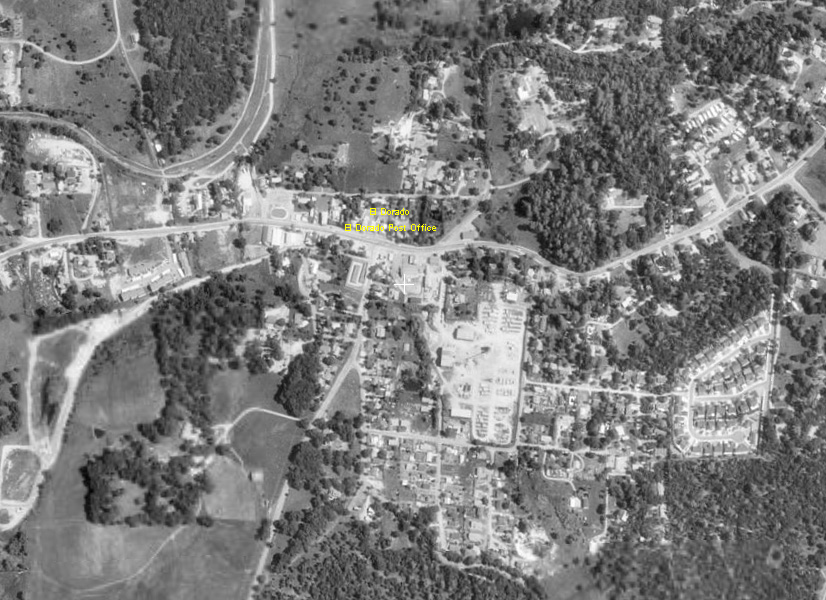
El Dorado map

El Dorado (Spanish for "The Golden") is an unincorporated community in El Dorado County, California, United States. It is located 4 miles (6.4 km) southwest of Placerville, at an elevation of 1608 feet (490 m). The town is registered as California Historical Landmark #486. The ZIP code is 95623. The community is served by area code 530.

== History ==
El Dorado, "The Gilded One", was first known as Mud Springs from the boggy quagmire the cattle and horses made of a nearby watering place. Originally an important camp on the old Carson Trail, by 1849–50 it had become the center of a mining district and the crossroads for freight and stagecoach lines. At the height of the rush its large gold production supported a population of several thousand. It was incorporated as the town of El Dorado in 1856.

El Dorado was a station of the Central Overland Pony Express. On April 13, 1860, William (Sam) Hamilton, a pony rider, changed horses at the Nevada House. He was carrying the first westbound mail of the Pony Express from St. Joseph, Missouri to Sacramento.

The first post office in Mud Spring was opened in 1851. The name was changed to El Dorado in 1855. The town incorporated in 1855 and disincorporated in 1857.

In 1945, a bar in an 1850s building, originally a Wells Fargo weigh station, was converted into a roadside barbecue joint, called Poor Red’s Bar-B-Q. Because the town is roughly halfway between San Francisco and Lake Tahoe, drivers - including the Rat Pack - frequently stopped there.

== Politics ==
In the state legislature, El Dorado is in the 1st senatorial district, represented by Republican Megan Dahle, and the 5th Assembly district, represented by Republican Joe Patterson.

Federally, El Dorado is in California's 5th congressional district, represented by Republican Tom McClintock.
