= James E. Birch (entrepreneur) =

American businessman (1827–1857)

James E. Birch (November 30, 1827 – September 1857) was a stagecoach line entrepreneur, founder of the California Stage Company, the largest stage line in California in the 1850s; and in 1857 the San Antonio-San Diego Mail Line, the first transcontinental mail route in the United States.

== Early life ==
James E. Birch was born in South Carolina, Birch moved as a young man to Providence, Rhode Island, where he worked at a livery stable as a stagecoach driver. After getting engaged, in 1848 he left for California to make his fortune.

== California Stage Company ==
In the spring of 1849, he arrived in Sacramento City, which was fast becoming the supply center for the mining region. It was the departure point for the thousands of prospectors heading for the gold fields, most by foot, some by horseback. Prices for land, goods and services were high and climbing daily. Instead of heading for the gold fields, Birch determined to start a stagecoach business to provide transportation to the various mining areas, as well as provide mail delivery to the prospectors. Previously, most mail for the miners had been held in San Francisco until they personally picked it up.

Birch first used an old ranch wagon which he drove himself, hauling passengers from Sacramento City to Coloma in the rugged foothills of the Sierra Nevada and to points between, including "Sutter's Fort," a resting/relay station near Coloma. For the 50-mile trip at a speed of 10 to 12 miles per hour (16 to 19 km/h), Birch charged 2 ounces of gold (about $32 in 1849) each way. Miners hurried to reach each new mining area as it opened up, in order to stake their claims before an area became saturated. Birch was very adept at forecasting where the next important area would be and at quickly providing service there. For the first several months, Birch had a partner, Charles F. Davenport, a close friend and former owner of a stage company in Rhode Island, who had traveled with him to California. By August 1849 Birch had bought out Davenport and become sole owner of the enterprise.

On August 18, 1849, Birch advertised the changes in his business in Sacramento's Placer Times, announcing himself as the sole proprietor. By the spring of 1850, he hired drivers for his stages, and turned his full attention to managing the business. With the arrival of a fleet of top-of-the-line stagecoaches which he had ordered from the East, his firm became the envy of all others. Among those he hired as drivers was Charley Parkhurst, who became known as Six-Horse Charley, one of the top drivers and, only after his death in 1879, as a woman who had passed as a man. Although business was sometimes adversely affected by frequent stagecoach robberies, and periods of terrible weather, forcing temporary closure of some lines, Birch rapidly expanded. Before the end of 1851, Birch's company was providing service to all the northern and southern mining areas east of Stockton, California. Birch returned for a time to Swansea, Massachusetts, where he arranged for and oversaw the building of a mansion. On September 12, 1852, he and Julia Chace were married and began living on their new estate.

In March 1853, James Birch returned to California. He had frequently advertised in the two Sacramento newspapers and elsewhere, and, with his outgoing personality and obvious business acumen, he became a very popular figure of the time. He received many glowingly favorable editorial mentions in newspapers both in California and on the East Coast. He sold off stage lines to areas which were about to become played out, and used the profits to start new, more promising lines. In the face of increased competition, he lowered fares effectively. By the end of 1853, he was so successful that he and others formed the California Stage Company. Birch served as president, and his good friend Frank Shaw Stevens as vice-president. Incorporated with a value of $1 million at $1000 per share, the California Stage Company had about 80 per cent of the stage business in the state, and paid frequent dividends.

In March 1854 his business was going so well, that Birch took a brief trip back East. By the fall of 1854, the California Stage Company provided service to almost all northern and central California, including non-mining areas, as well as to Los Angeles in the south. In February 1855 Birch withdrew as president of the company, though remaining its largest stockholder. He returned to the East for a nearly two-year stay. In 1856 a son, Frank Stevens Birch, named after Birch's best friend, was born to the Birches.

== San Antonio-San Diego Mail Line ==
During this period, Birch divided his time between Swansea, where he and his wife entertained lavishly, and Washington, D.C. In the capital, he lobbied certain legislators, such as his friend William M. Gwin, one of the first two U.S. Senators from California, trying to obtain the contract for coast-to-coast mail service. Although the largest contracts were given to a southern Democrat by the newly elected President James Buchanan, Birch gained the rights to the route from San Antonio, Texas to San Diego, California. Returning to California in the summer of 1857, Birch worked to consolidate his interests and set up the San Antonio-San Diego Mail Line in partnership with George Henry Giddings, owner of the San Antonio-El Paso Mail. On June 13, 1857, Birch's California Stage Company became the first stage company to provide service across the rugged Sierra Nevada.

== Death at sea ==
On August 20, 1857, traveling to New York City to set up a national office, Birch sailed from San Francisco to Panama, took a train across the Isthmus, and sailed for New York on the paddle steamer SS Central America. After a stop in Havana, the ship was caught in a hurricane. Damaged, it floundered for several days and sank on September 12, 1857. Many passengers reached lifeboats and were later rescued, but James Birch was not among them. Birch was one of a number of survivors who clung to a piece of the ship's wreckage, tossed in stormy seas for days. Most died of exposure or, like Birch, were swept away to their deaths. Three men survived, aided by Birch's having held on to a silver cup. It was a gift from his superintendent, John Andrews, for his son and was engraved with "John to Frank".

Birch gave the cup to George Dawson, a sailor who used it to collect rain water for drinking, and survived until rescue nine days later. After return to land, he gave the cup to Birch's widow, who gave him a reward.

== Legacy ==
Birch is the namesake to the now-extinct community of Birch, Nevada.
