= Pilot Hill, California =

Unincorporated community in California, United States

Pilot Hill
- Unincorporated community
- Location in California Pilot Hill (the United States)
- Coordinates: 38°50′06″N 121°00′52″W
- Country: United States
- State: California
- County: El Dorado
- Elevation: 1,175 ft (358 m)
- ZIP code: 95664
- Area codes: 279 and 916

Pilot Hill (formerly Centerville, Pilothill, and Pittsfield) is an unincorporated community in El Dorado County, California, United States. It is located 13 miles (21 km) west-northwest of Placerville, at an elevation of 1175 feet (358 m).

In 1849, mining commenced at Pilot Hill. Originally, Centerville, Pilot Hill, and Pittsfield were separate nearby mining camps that unified under the name Centerville. The post office came in 1854 and bestowed the name Pilot Hill. Farm Trails - Pilot Hill is on the Farm Trails Map. Lavender, Olives and Grapes can be picked seasonally at Enchanted April Farm on historic Salmon Falls Road in Pilot Hill.

Alabaster Cave is nearby.
