= North Yuba AVA =

California wine region in Yuba County

Coordinates: 39°19′40″N 121°14′35″W

North Yuba
- Wine region
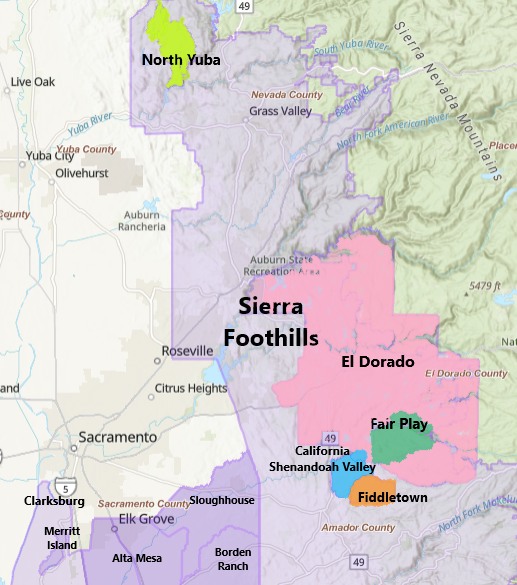
- Type: American Viticultural Area
- Year established: 1985
- Years of wine industry: 176
- Country: United States
- Part of: California, Sierra Foothills AVA
- Other regions in California, Sierra Foothills AVA: California Shenandoah Valley AVA, El Dorado AVA, Fair Play AVA, Fiddletown AVA
- Growing season: 215-287 days
- Climate region: Region II-III
- Precipitation (annual average): 20 to 25 in (508–635 mm)
- Soil conditions: Sierra-Auberry, Englebright-Rescue and Dobbins developed from granitic and igneous rocks
- Total area: 22,400 acres (35 sq mi)
- Size of planted vineyards: 365 acres (148 ha)
- No. of vineyards: 5
- Grapes produced: Cabernet Franc, Cabernet Sauvignon, Chardonnay, Grenache, Malbec, Merlot, Petit Verdot, Pinot noir, Riesling, Sangiovese, Sauvignon blanc, Semillon, Syrah, Zinfandel
- Varietals produced: 13
- No. of wineries: 4

North Yuba is an American Viticultural Area (AVA) located in Yuba County, California about 70 miles (113 km) north of Sacramento. It was established as the nation's 81^{st}, the state's 46^{th} and the county's initial appellation on July 30, 1985 by the Bureau of Alcohol, Tobacco, Firearms and Explosives (ATF), Treasury after reviewing the petition submitted by Karl Werner and James R. Bryant, officers of Renaissance Vineyard and Winery, Inc. in Oregon House proposing the viticultural area to be named "North Yuba."

"North Yuba" is the name used locally to designate the area in north central Yuba County in which the towns of Dobbins and Oregon House are located. The appellation consists of the middle and upper foothills in Yuba County immediately west of the Sierra Range and north of the Yuba River. The 2,000 feet (610 m) contour line of the Sierra Nevada Mountains forms the eastern and northern portions of the boundary of the viticultural area and the 1,000 feet (300 m) contour line north of the Yuba River canyon forms the southern portion of the boundary. The soil is primarily volcanic, with dense plutonic rock. In 1985, the appellation encompassed 22,400 acres (35 sq mi) with 365 acres (148 ha) of cultivation and one commercial winery operating in the "North Yuba." Renaissance Vineyard and Winery was the largest producer in the region, with 365 acres (148 ha) of terraced vineyards. Cabernet Sauvignon is the primary wine grape grown with Rhône varietals Syrah, Grenache, Semillon, Viognier and Roussanne also flourishing.

== History ==
The Yuba region was originally inhabited and visited for centuries by indigenous tribes namely the Bogas, Cushnas, Erskins, Hocks, Holillipah, Machucknas, Nimsǔs, Olippas, Seshums, Tagus, Yubas, Olashes and Yukulmes. Early European settlers were hunters and trappers drawn to the abundance of game in the mountainous wilderness. The name "Yuba" (/ˈjuːbə/ YOO-buh) is derived when the Yuba River, the chief tributary of Feather River, was called "Uva" by the Spanish expedition in 1824, from the immense quantities of vines that shaded its banks and the area, overloaded with wild grapes, properly called "uvas silvestres" in Spanish. The name was commonly used to designate land, camps, towns, businesses, schools and county. Captain John Sutter received permission from Mexican authorities to select a place for settlement in the Sacramento Valley. After some difficulty, he succeeded to traveling to the junction of the Sacramento and American rivers on August 16, 1839, Satisfied with the conditions and prospects of the region, he picked a location and commenced construction of a house. He named the spot "New Helvetia" to honor his mother's Swiss origin. Viticulture came to Yuba County in the 1850s. Documents show the planting of wine grapes and the establishment of a winery in 1855. By 1860, Yuba County had five wineries and 800 acres (324 ha) devoted to wine grape cultivation. By 1930, there were 1,000 acres (405 ha) under vine. However, as a consequence of Prohibition, the vineyards were replaced by orchards of peaches and prunes as the wineries closed.

In the late 1960s, East Bay schoolteacher, Robert Earl Burton, founded Fellowship of Friends based on a pedagogy similar to the Fourth Way. "Fellowship" bought a remote property near Oregon House, built a sanctuary named "Apollo" and created Renaissance Winery beginning with 12 acres (5 ha) under vine. For next four decades, Renaissance grew to make quality vintages, expanding to 365 acres (148 ha) under vine, producing more than 40,000 cases of wine annually, and single-handedly established an American Viticultural Area until it ceased operations in 2015 leasing its vineyards to local wineries. Today, these local vintners are dedicated to promote this "crucial and undervalued slice of California terroir."

== Terroir ==
=== Topography ===
The North Yuba viticultural area consists of the middle and upper foothills in Yuba County immediately west of the Sierra Nevadas and north of the Yuba River. The 2,000 feet (610 m)contour line of the Sierra Nevada Mountains forms the eastern and northern portions of the boundary of the proposed viticultural area and the 1,000 feet (305 m) contour line north of the Yuba River canyon forms the southern portion of the boundary. The eastern bank of Woods Creek forms part of the western portion of the boundary. The area is approximately 7 miles (11 km) in length from north to south and 3 to 6 miles (5–10 km) in width from west to east. The principal streams which drain the area are Dobbins Creek and the upper portions of Dry Creek. Both streams flow into the Yuba River. The land drained by these streams shares similar geological history, topographical features, soils, and climatic conditions. The portions of the area which are currently devoted to viticulture consist of foothill slopes between 1,000 and 2,000 feet (305 and 610 m) above sea level. The topography of the viticultural area ranges from gently rolling hills to steeper slopes at the base of the Sierra Nevadas and generally ranges in elevation from 1,000 to 2,000 feet (305–610 m) above sea level. Lying between the high Sierras to the east and the lowlands of the Sacramento Valley to the west, the boundary of the viticultural area defines a region well suited for viticulture. The topography of the area ensures adequate ventilation for viticulture. The area escapes both the early frosts and snow of higher elevations in the Sierra Nevadas and the heat, humidity and fog common to the lowlands in the Sacramento Valley.

The area is an example of a middle foothill to lower mountain landscape that has been formed during a long period of geologic time. The area is underlain by igneous and granitic rocks that extend along the base of the Sierra Nevadas. It is geologically well defined by the Sierra Nevadas to the north and east, by greenstone rock to the west, and by the Yuba River canyon to the south.

=== Climate ===
Generally, Yuba County has an interior "Mediterranean" type climate. However, the location of the "North Yuba" viticultural area in the middle to upper foothills region approaching the mountainous terrain of the Sierra Nevadas allows a subtle distinction in climatological characteristics from the rest of the county in that the area escapes both the heat and fog common to the lowlands of the Sacramento Valley and the early frosts and snow of the higher elevations of the Sierra Nevadas. The lands of the Sacramento Valley in Yuba County range from 30 to 250 feet (9–76 m) above sea level and the mean average rainfall is 20 to 25 inches (508–635 mm). The valley lands are an extensive area of floodplains, terraces, alluvial fans and basins. The mountains of Yuba County are part of the western slope of the Sierra Nevadas. This is a region of gently rounded ridges, moderately steep rolling hillsides, and rugged, steep canyon slopes, that is deeply entrenched by the Yuba River and its tributaries. Basic metavolcanic rocks are dominant in this area. Elevations range from 1,600 to 4,000 feet (488–1,219 m) above sea level. Rain increases with elevation and ranges from 45 to 80 inches (1,143–2,032 mm), much of which falls as snow at higher elevations. The middle to upper foothills in which the viticultural area lies occupy the lower western slope of the Sierra Nevadas between the valley lands and the mountainous uplands of the county. This is an area of rolling to steep hills with conspicuous ridges and peaks. Rock outcroppings are common. The central foothills region ranges in elevation from 250 to 2,700 feet (76–823 m) above sea level. However, the viticultural area generally ranges in elevation from 1,000 to 2,000 feet (305–610 m) above sea level and can be distinguished from surrounding areas by rainfall. The rainfall within the area increases gradually with elevation from 25 to 50 inches (635–1,270 mm). For example, the mean annual precipitation at the Dobbins-Colgate weather station is 40.4 inches (1,026.2 mm) compared to 61.9 inches (1,572.3 mm) at the Camptonville station to the east of the area and 20.7 inches (525.8 mm) at Marysville to the west of the area. Such statistics are corroborated by a map adapted from the State of California Department of Water Resources Seasonal Isohyetal Map (1905 to 1955) to show mean annual precipitation for Yuba County. The map distinguishes by rainfall the central foothills region from the areas to the west and to the east. The growing season of North Yuba is distinctly cooler than the neighboring Sacramento Valley to the west and warmer than the mountainous area to the east. The climate of the area is characterized by cool summer night temperatures, often dropping to 30 °F (−1 °C) below daytime highs and allowing the grapes to retain sufficient acidity to balance the high sugar levels induced by daytime sunshine. Foothill winds are an additional cooling factor in summer, contributing further to the development of proper acidity in the area's grapes. These cooling winds are distinguished from those of the valley. At the higher foothill elevations, the winds conform more closely with the free-flowing westerly winds over northern California rather than the southwesterly winds which come up from the Carquinez Strait into the lowland area of Yuba County. Climatological data from three weather stations of the Department of Commerce (DOC), National Oceanographic and Atmospheric Administration (NOAA) document the climatological differences between "North Yuba" and adjoining areas. The data from these stations when compared with data compiled over the 10-year period 1975 to 1984 from vineyards in the vicinity of Oregon House show the following differences in climate between "North Yuba" and surrounding areas:

NOAA Climate data of North Yuba vineyards (1975–1984)
Location	Elevation (ft)	Mean (annual)	Rainfall (in)	Growing season (days)
Marysville	60	62.9 F	20.7	273
Dobbins-Colgate	600	62.6 F	40.4	267
Oregon House	1,500	59.0 F	35 to 40	215 to 255
Camptonville	2,755	57.5 F	61.9	185

The USDA plant hardiness zones range from 9a to 9b.

=== Soil ===
The three major physiographic units in Yuba County are the valley lands of the Sacramento Valley, the Sierra Nevadas to the east of the valley, and the foothills region which lies between the valley and the mountains. The area is an example of a middle foothill to lower mountain landscape that has been formed during a long period of geologic time. The area is underlain by igneous and granitic rocks that extend along the base of the Sierra Nevadas. It is geologically well defined by the Sierra Nevadas to the north and east, by greenstone rock to the west, and by the Yuba River canyon to the south.

There are nine soil associations common to the valley lands, three common to the foothills region, and six common to the mountainous terrain. Of the 18 soil associations found in Yuba County, basically three distinguish the soils of the viticultural area from the soils in surrounding areas of the county and the adjoining counties of Butte and Nevada in California. The soil associations common to the appellation area are Sierra-Auberry, Englebright-Rescue, and Dobbins. These soils are typical of those developed from granitic and igneous rocks. The soils are shallow to very deep, rocky, cobbly and rocky, or non-cobbly and rocky and are generally well drained. "Soils of the Yuba County, California", a 1969 soil survey published jointly by the Department of Soils and Plant Nutrition of the University of California, Davis and by the County of Yuba, California, contains a color coded general soil map which clearly shows a pattern of these three soil association in the middle and upper foothills region of Yuba County between the predominant soil association of the lower foothills, Auburn-Sobrante-Las Posas, and the predominant soil association of the mountains, Challenge-Tish Tang. The boundary includes small areas of Auburn-Sobrante-Las Posas, Challenge-Tish Tang and Rackerby-Dobbins, a mountain soil association. Data from the soil survey of Yuba County and the 1975 soil survey of Nevada County, which lies south of Yuba County, strongly support the boundary established in this final rule.
