= Fiddletown =

Fiddletown may refer to:

- Fiddletown, New South Wales, Australia
- Fiddletown, California, United States
  - Fiddletown AVA, California wine region in Amador County
