= El Dorado AVA =

Appellation that designates wine in El Dorado County, California

Coordinates: 38°46′47″N 120°53′33″W

El Dorado
- Wine region
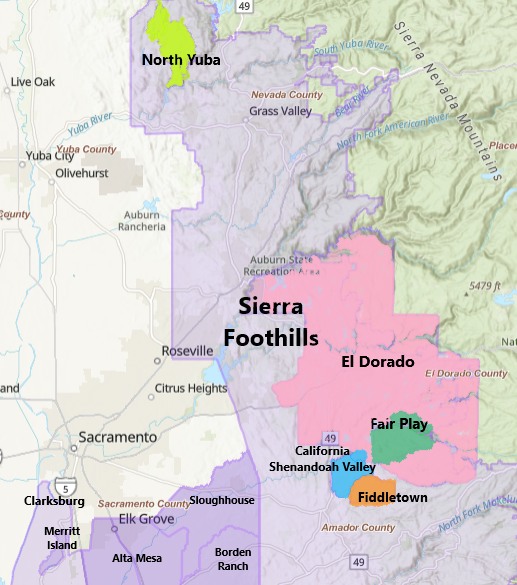
- Type: American Viticultural Area
- Year established: 1983; 1987 Amended
- Years of wine industry: 178
- Country: United States
- Part of: California, Sierra Foothills AVA
- Other regions in California, Sierra Foothills AVA: Fiddletown AVA, North Yuba AVA
- Sub-regions: California Shenandoah Valley AVA, Fair Play AVA
- Precipitation (annual average): 33 to 45 in (838–1,143 mm); 3–4 in (76–102 mm) per 300 ft (91 m) elevation rise
- Soil conditions: Volcanic and sedimentary deposits; alkaline
- Total area: 1,093,120 acres (1,708 sq mi)
- Size of planted vineyards: 2,000 acres (809 ha)
- Grapes produced: Aglianico, Albarino, Barbera, Cabernet Franc, Cabernet Sauvignon, Carignan, Charbono, Chardonnay, Cinsault, Counoise, Fiano, Gewurztraminer, Graciano, Grenache noir, Grenache blanc, Lagrein, Malbec, Marsanne, Merlot, Mondeuse, Mourvedre, Muscat Canelli, Muscat of Alexandria, Petite Sirah, Pinot gris, Pinot noir, Pinotage, Piquepoul, Riesling, Rolle, Roussanne, Sangiovese, Sauvignon blanc, Semillon, Syrah, Tannat, Tempranillo, Tinta Cao, Touriga Nacional, Vermentino, Viognier, Zinfandel
- Varietals produced: 32
- No. of wineries: 55

El Dorado is an American Viticultural Area (AVA) located in El Dorado County, California, east of the state's capital, Sacramento and centered around the county seat of Placerville. It was established as the nation's 46^{th}, the state's 30^{th} and the county's second appellation on October 13, 1983 by the Bureau of Alcohol, Tobacco and Firearms (ATF), Treasury after reviewing the petition submitted by the El Dorado Wine Grape Growers Association of Camino, California proposing the viticultural area named "El Dorado."
The area includes parts of El Dorado County on the north border by the Middle Fork American River and on the south by the South Fork of the Cosumnes River. El Dorado viticultural area lies within the vast 2.60-million-acre (4,062 sq mi) Sierra Foothills viticultural area, one of the largest appellations in California, which extends about 170 miles (274 km) through portions of Yuba, Nevada, Placer, El Dorado, Amador, Calaveras, Tuolumne and Mariposa Counties. The El Dorado viticultural area encompasses 1.09 million acres (1,708 sq mi) which entirely includes Fair Play and a small portion of the northeastern part of the California Shenandoah Valley AVAs.

== History ==
The El Dorado region was originally inhabited by the Maidu, Nisenan, Washoe and Miwok indigenous tribes. In the early 18th century, European and American mountain men were drawn to the abundance of game in the Sierra wilderness. Prospectors were attracted by the untouched ore-rich geology in the Sierra foothills. The Spaniards settled in California, but did not settle in El Dorado and neither did the Mexicans. In 1848, the California Gold Rush began with James W. Marshall discovering gold at Sutter's Mill on the South Fork American River in Coloma. As a result, the name "El Dorado" was derived from the Spanish word for "The Gilded One." El Dorado was one of the 27 original counties, in 1850, when California became the 31st state admitted into the Union. As the gold-seeking migrants raced to California to seek their fortunes, the region's viticulture destiny was taking root becoming the state's oldest wine-producing region. By 1870, El Dorado County was among the largest wine producers in the state, trailing only Los Angeles and Sonoma counties. The county's viticulture industry flourished with 28 principal wineries and approximately 2,100 acres (850 ha) under vine. By the turn of the century, El Dorado experienced a gradual decline resulting from numerous national economic downturns in agriculture, a diminishing local population and ultimately Prohibition closed the remaining wineries.

Between 1920 and 1960, viticulture virtually disappeared from the county. It was until the late 1960s that wine growing made a resurgence when only 11 acres (4 ha) were devoted to wine grapes in the entire county. Following the development of several experimental vineyards, it became apparent that the topography, climate and soil of El Dorado County were ideally suited to a quality viticulture industry producing excellent wine. With the opening of Boeger Winery in 1973, El Dorado was again on its way to becoming renown as a wine producing region. Other wineries such as Madrona, Sierra Vista, and Lava Cap were also early pioneers developing the growing industry centered around the town of Placerville and on the surrounding slopes. The El Dorado County viticulture business has since grown steadily for decades.

== Terroir ==
=== Topography ===
El Dorado appellation is unique due to its high elevation and complex topography. Its mountain vineyards are perched high above the large Central Valley near sea level. El Dorado lies in the 360 miles (579 km) foothill "belt" of the north-central Sierra Nevada mountains where vineyards primarily are at elevations between 600 and 3,500 feet (183 and 1,067 m) above sea level. The viticultural area benefits from cool air drainage that flows down the mountain slopes toward the valleys pushing hotter air off the vineyards creating diverse micro-climates and growing conditions not found in other regions in the Central Valley or coastal mountain areas. Some of the historic and revered vineyards are planted at and above 2,000 feet (610 m). Coastal mountains may have vineyard elevations of 200 to 1,500 feet (61–457 m), where El Dorado vineyards tend to start at 1,200 to 3,500 feet (366–1,067 m) or even higher for some vineyards.

=== Climate ===
The higher average elevation of El Dorado, as opposed to the lower foothill areas, and the Central Valley guarantees it a more favorable growing climate. Indian summer with cool nights and warm days extends the growing season into October. Little rainfall occurs until late October and November. Thus, the area is cooled by elevation rather than by the fog that is common to the coastal regions. Therefore, the grapes receive more direct sunlight, thus ripening fully without retaining excess herbaceous characters or acidity that is out of balance with the fruit flavors. The relatively cool fall temperatures also allow the grapes a long "hang time" for uniform ripening. Approximately 32 varietals ranging from Gewürztraminer, which does best in the higher and cooler portions of the county, to Zinfandel and Barbera, which ripen perfectly in warmer climates. The USDA plant hardiness zones range from 8b to 9b.

=== Soil ===
In conjunction with the climate, there are three basic soil types determining the characteristics of the region: fine-grained volcanic rock, decomposed granite and fine-grained shale. El Dorado viticultural area is located on the western slope of the central Sierra Nevada Mountains. It is dominated by steeply dipping, faulty and folded metamorphic rocks that have been intruded by igneous rocks. Overlaying the bedrock in many places are mantels of river gravel and volcanic debris. The soils of the region are magma based with high levels of acidity. Varying in elevation and topography, each soil offers good drainage and the nutrients needed to encourage vines producing rich, deeply flavored grapes.

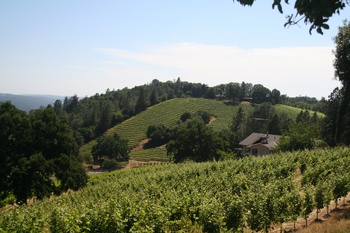
El Dorado County vineyard

== Viticulture industry ==
The unique combination of climate, soil and topography found in the El Dorado appellation produces wines of distinction, depth and density with a maturity unmatched in other regions. This is El Dorado's "Terroir." The area has more than 2,000 acres (809 ha) under vine where over 32 different varietals are planted, and is home to approximately 50 to 60 boutique or small production wineries. Wine grape growers in the region produce a diversity of varietals, most notable are Zinfandel, Barbera, Cabernet Sauvignon, Merlot and Petite Sirah. A significant culture of Rhône varietals have been cultivated in El Dorado for many decades including significant crops of Viognier, Syrah, Mourvedre and Grenache.

== Resident vineyards and wineries ==
There are at least four distinct micro-regions within the area where the vineyards/wineries are located with their unique terroir and character: Greater El Dorado, Apple Hill / Camino, Pleasant Valley and Fair Play.

- Batia Vineyards
- Boeger Winery
- Bumgarner Wines
- Busby Cellars
- Cantiga Wineworks
- Capelli Wine
- Cedarville Vineyard
- C.G. di Arie
- Charles B. Mitchell Vineyards
- Chateau Davell
- Chateau D' Estienne
- Cielo Estate
- Cielo Sulla Terra Estate Vineyards and Winery
- Conduit Wine
- Crystal Basin Cellars
- David Girard Vineyards
- Del Fino Farms
- Divittorio Winery
- E16 Winery
- Element 79 Vineyards
- Everhart Cellars
- Field Number Fifteen Winery
- Findleton Estate Winery
- Golden Leaves Wines
- Gold Hill Vineyard & Brewery
- Grace Patriot Wines
- Gwinllan Estate Winery
- Holly's Hill
- Iverson Winery
- Kehret Vineyards
- Lava Cap Winery
- Madroña
- Mastroserio Winery
- Medeiros Family Wines
- Mediterranean Vineyards
- Mellowood Vineyard
- Miraflores
- MV Winery
- Myka Estates and Cellars
- Narrow Gate Vineyards
- Nello Olivo Wines
- Oakstone Winery
- Rucksack Cellars
- Saluti Cellars
- Shadow Ranch
- Sentivo Vineyards
- Sierra Vista Vineyards & Winery
- Skinner Vineyards
- Smokey Ridge Winery
- Toogood Winery
- Starfield Vineyards
- Via Romano Vineyards
- Windwalker Vineyards
- Wofford Acres
