= Sierra Foothills AVA =

Wine region in the California, U.S.

Coordinates: 38°09′44″N 120°28′44″W

Sierra Foothills
- Wine region
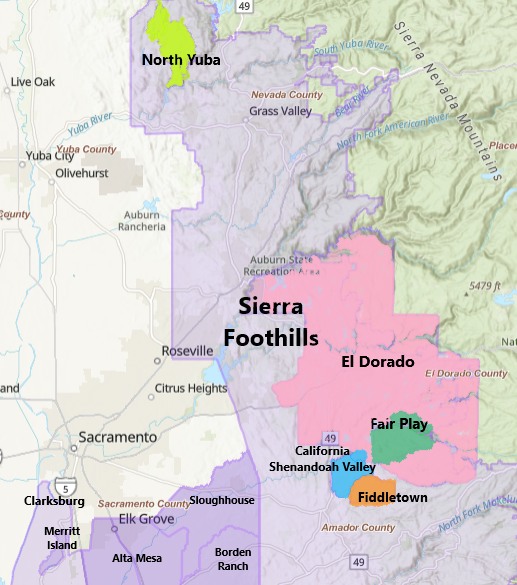
- Type: American Viticultural Area
- Year established: 1987
- Years of wine industry: 186
- Country: United States
- Part of: California
- Sub-regions: California Shenandoah Valley AVA, El Dorado AVA, Fair Play AVA, Fiddletown AVA, North Yuba AVA
- Growing season: 100–300 days
- Climate region: Region II-III
- Precipitation (annual average): 20 in (508 mm)
- Soil conditions: weathered igneous, volcanic, metamorphic & metasedimentary overlying granite
- Total area: 2.69 million acres (4,200 sq mi)
- Size of planted vineyards: 5,700 acres (2,307 ha)
- No. of vineyards: 150
- Grapes produced: Barbera, Cabernet Franc, Cabernet Sauvignon, Chardonnay, Chenin Blanc, Gewurztraminer, Grenache, Merlot, Petite Sirah, Sangiovese, Sauvignon Blanc, Syrah, Viognier, Zinfandel
- Varietals produced: 446
- No. of wineries: 182

Sierra Foothills is a vast American Viticultural Area (AVA) encompassing portions of seven of the twelve California counties in the foothill "belt" of the Sierra Nevadas in north-central California, an interior range that extends about 360 miles (580 km) in a northwest–southeast orientation from Mt. Lassen to Walker Pass near Bakersfield. The 2.69-million-acre (4,200 sq mi) viticultural area is approximately 160 miles (260 km) long and lies 40 miles (64 km) to the east of Sacramento.

It was established as the nation's 96^{th} and the state's 56^{th} appellation on November 18, 1987 by the Bureau of Alcohol, Tobacco, Firearms and Explosives (ATF), Treasury after reviewing the petition submitted by the Sierra Foothills Winery Association of Somerset, California proposing a viticultural area in portions of Yuba, Nevada, Placer, El Dorado, Amador, Calaveras, Tuolumne and Mariposa Counties named "Sierra Foothills." Wine grapes were introduced to the area in the nineteenth century during the California Gold Rush of 1849. Over 280 vineyards/wineries are located within its boundaries.

== History ==
The California Gold Rush spawned viticulture in the western foothills of the Sierra Nevadas. Some of the prospectors possessed knowledge about grape tending and winemaking and turned to a more settled way of life, planting orchards and vineyards, as placer mining diminished.

In 1855, the state legislature passed a law which exempted from taxation all newly planted grape vines for four years. The number of grape vines in El Dorado County jumped from 24,000 in 1856 to 77,500 1858; in Tuolumne County from 9,000 to 50,000 between 1857 and 1858.

The first foothills winery was established in 1856 near Plymouth in Shenandoah Valley. This winery is the fourth oldest in the State of California.

In 1861, the Son Francisco Bulletin featured a front-page story titled "Vineyards in the Foothills." The foothill counties ranked among California's major wine producers during the 1870s and 1880s. In The Wines of America, Leon Adams states that "by 1890, more than 100 wineries were operating at such locations as Nevada City, Colfax, Lincoln, Penryn, Auburn, Placerville, Coloma, California, Shingle Springs, California, Ione, Volcano, Jackson, San Andreas, Sonora, Columbia, and Jamestown."

In the 1890s, viticulture had become established as a major industry. El Dorado County alone had approximately 8,000 acres (3,200 ha) of the 10,000 acres (4,000 ha) in vineyards at the peak of grape growing in the foothills counties. However, the decline of gold mining at the turn of the century, followed by a loss in population, phylloxera vine disease, and Prohibition, contributed to the eventual abandonment of all but a few vineyards. By 1930, vineyards were replaced by orchards of peaches and prunes.

After the repeal of Prohibition in 1933, wine grape growing re-surged in the valley lowlands.

The viticulture in Yuba County has been associated with the Sacramento Valley because from the mid-1930s to the early 1980s, wine grapes were not cultivated in the foothills of Yuba County.

== Terroir ==
The Sierra Foothills viticultural area encompasses Sierra Nevada's north-central foothill "belt", an interior range that extends about 360 miles (579 km) in a northwest to southeast orientation from Mt. Lassen to Walker Pass near Bakersfield. The area is approximately 170 miles (274 km) long from Yuba County to Mariposa County, and lies 40 miles (64 km) to the east of Sacramento, with elevations ranging from 500 feet (152 m) above sea level, e.g., Jackson Valley and Auburn Ravine, to 3,500 feet (1,067 m) in Mariposa County. In comparison with the North Yuba viticultural area, which ranges in elevation from 1,000 to 2,000 feet (305–610 m), the Sierra Foothills viticultural area fully includes the range in elevation for the North Yuba viticultural area. The area encompasses 4,200 square miles (2,688,000 acres) and is one of the state's largest viticultural areas. The USDA plant hardiness zones range from 8a to 9b.

The characteristics which distinguish the Sierra Foothills viticultural area from surrounding areas are summarized as follows:

- Name (viticulture found geographically in the foothills "belt" of the Sierra Nevadas);
- History (origins dating to the Gold Rush of 1849);
- Geology, topography, elevation and soils (the region is part of the Sierra Nevada geomorphic province, with different geology and soils than the Great Valley province and the High Sierras); and,
- Climate, rainfall and temperature (the region has warm summer days and cool nights, with lower temperatures and higher rainfall than the Central Valley and higher temperatures and lower rainfall than the mountainous uplands of the Sierra Nevadas).

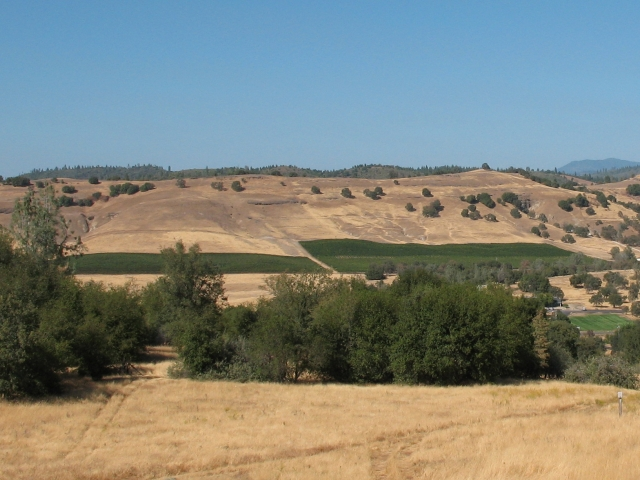
Vineyards near Vallecito, California

== Vineyards ==
Sierra Foothills has 5,700 acres (2,307 ha) being cultivated for wine grapes on about 150 vineyards. The most common grape variety is Zinfandel, which accounts for 2,300 acres (931 ha). Cabernet Sauvignon is planted on 600 acres (243 ha), and Syrah is planted on 560 acres (227 ha). The most common white grape variety is Chardonnay, planted on 289 acres (117 ha). Other grape varieties are grown in smaller quantities. Vineyards are generally planted in locations 1,500 to 3,000 feet (460–910 m) above sea level.

There are over 200 wineries within the Sierra Foothills. Many are small, boutique wineries, often family-owned. The first known planting in the Sierra Foothills was in the Coarsegold Gulch area during the Gold Rush period.

- Lone Buffalo Winery
- Ironstone Vineyards
- Le Casque Winery

== See also ==
- California wine
