= Oregon House =

Oregon House may refer to:

- Oregon House of Representatives, U.S.
- Oregon House, California, a small community in California, U.S.
