= Kelly Services =

American office staffing company

Kelly Services, Inc.
- Formerly: Russell Kelly Office Service; Kelly Girl Service, Inc.
- Type: Public
- Traded as: Nasdaq: KELYA (Class A)
- Industry: Professional services
- Founded: 1946; 80 years ago
- Founder: William Russell Kelly
- Headquarters: Troy, Michigan, U.S.
- Areas served: North and South America; AsiaPacific; Europe, the Middle East, and Africa
- Key people: Peter Quigley (president & CEO)
- Services: Human resource consulting; management consulting; outsourcing; recruitment; career transition; vendor management
- Revenue: ▼US$4.52 billion (2020)
- Operating income: US$67 million (2015)
- Net income: ▼US$−72 million (2020)
- Total assets: ▲US$2.562 billion (2020)
- Total equity: ▼US$1.203 billion (2020)
- Number of employees: 7,100 (2020)
- Website: kellyservices.com

Kelly Services, Inc. (formerly Russell Kelly Office Service and Kelly Girl Service, Inc.) is an American multinational office staffing company. The company places employees at all levels in various sectors including financial services, information technology, and law. Also, its professional services include human resource and management consulting, outsourcing, recruitment, career transition, and vendor management. Kelly Services was founded by William Russell Kelly in 1946 and is headquartered in Troy, Michigan.

== History ==
Founded in 1946 by William Russell Kelly, the company was originally named Russell Kelly Office Service. Services were provided in-house at the Kelly office. However, as customer offices grew and needed more resources, they began to ask for the Kelly employees to perform the work at their own offices. Temporary workers from Russell Kelly Office Service, often women, soon became known as ‘Kelly Girls’. Adelaide Hess Moran, the first Kelly temporary employee to work at a customer’s office, was promptly dubbed the first ‘Kelly Girl’.

The company name was changed to Kelly Girl Service, Inc. in 1957. Eventually "Kelly girl" became a widely used term for a temporary worker, regardless of company affiliation or gender. By 1966, the company had expanded to include industrial and technical services divisions and was renamed Kelly Services, Inc.

In 2008, Lynn Noyes was awarded $6.5 million in damages from Kelly Services for failing to promote her because she was not part of the Fellowship of Friends cult.

In 2015, the company reported 8,100 employees, $5.5 billion in revenue, making it one of the world's largest staffing firms. In 2018, the company reported $5.5 billion in revenue.

As of 2019, the CEO is Peter Quigley.

In May 2024, Kelly Services acquired Motion Recruitment Partners for $425 million in cash.

== See also ==
- ManpowerGroup
