= USS Billfish (SS-286) =

Submarine of the United States

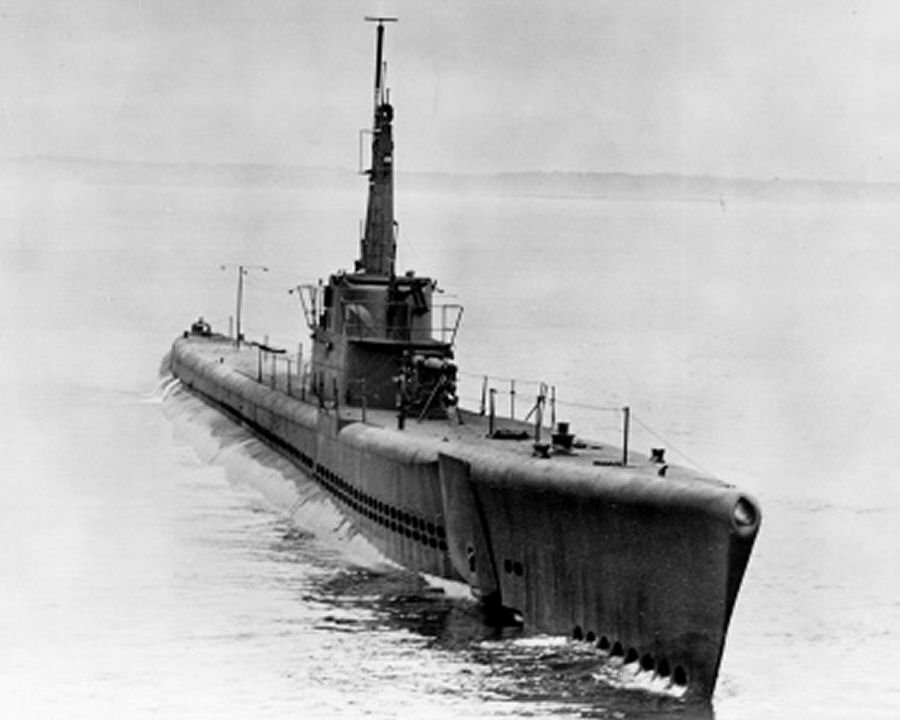
- USS Billfish

History

United States
- Builder: Portsmouth Naval Shipyard, Kittery, Maine
- Laid down: 23 July 1942
- Launched: 12 November 1942
- Sponsored by: Mrs. Lewis Parks
- Commissioned: 20 April 1943
- Decommissioned: 1 November 1946
- Reclassified: Auxiliary submarine (AGSS-286) 6 November 1962
- Stricken: 1 April 1968
- Honors and awards: Seven battle stars for World War II
- Fate: Sold for scrap, 17 March 1971

General characteristics
- Class & type: Balao-class diesel-electric submarine
- Displacement: 1,526 long tons (1,550 t) surfaced; 2,414 long tons (2,453 t) submerged
- Length: 311 ft 9 in (95.02 m)
- Beam: 27 ft 3 in (8.31 m)
- Draft: 16 ft 10 in (5.13 m) maximum
- Propulsion: 4 × General Motors Model 16-278A V16 diesel engines driving electrical generators; 2 × 126-cell Sargo batteries; 4 × high-speed General Electric electric motors with reduction gears; 2 × propellers; 5,400 shp (4.0 MW) surfaced; 2,740 shp (2.0 MW) submerged
- Speed: 20.25 knots (37.50 km/h) surfaced; 8.75 kn (16.21 km/h) submerged
- Range: 11,000 nautical miles (20,000 km) surfaced at 10 knots (19 km/h)
- Endurance: 48 hours at 2 knots (3.7 km/h) submerged; 75 days on patrol
- Test depth: 400 ft (120 m)
- Complement: 10 officers, 70–71 enlisted
- Armament: 10 × 21 inch (533 mm) torpedo tubes (six forward, four aft; 24 torpedoes); one 4 in (100 mm)/50 caliber deck gun; one 40 mm (1.57 in) Bofors antiaircraft cannon; two .50 cal (12.7 mm) machineguns

USS Billfish (SS-286), a Balao-class submarine, was the first ship of the United States Navy to bear the generic name for any fish, such as gar or marlin, with bill-shaped jaws. During World War II, Billfish made eight war patrols between 12 August 1943 and 27 August 1945. During these patrols she sank three Japanese cargo ships totaling 4,074 gross register tons and five smaller craft. She spent part of her seventh and eighth war patrols on lifeguard duty off Japan during Allied airstrikes.

== Construction and commissioning ==
Billfish was ordered on 15 December 1941. Her keel was laid down at Portsmouth Navy Yard in Kittery, Maine, on 23 July 1942. She was launched on 12 November 1942, sponsored by Mrs. Lewis Parks (wife of Lieutenant Commander Lewis Parks), and commissioned on 20 April 1943 with Lieutenant Commander Frederic C. Lucas, Jr., in command.

== Service history ==
=== World War II ===
==== April–August 1943 ====
After her commissioning, Billfish began shakedown training off the United States East Coast. She arrived at Newport, Rhode Island, from New London, Connecticut on 24 May 1943, then, after torpedo trials at Newport, moved from Newport back to New London on 28 May. She was on the slipway at New London from 19 to 22 June 1943.

On 24 June 1943, Billfish got underway from New London bound for Cristóbal in the Panama Canal Zone, which she reached on 2 July 1943. She transited the Panama Canal on 6 July 1943, and departed Balboa, Panama Canal Zone, the same day bound for Brisbane, Australia, to deploy to the South West Pacific Area. She reached Brisbane on 1 August 1943.

From 8 to 10 August 1943, Billfish conducted antisubmarine warfare exercises off Brisbane with the Royal Australian Navy destroyer HMAS Vendetta and Royal Australian Air Force aircraft. After Vendetta parted company with her on 10 August to make for Moreton Bay, Billfish remained at sea for one more day of exercises on 11 August before returning to Brisbane.

==== First war patrol ====
Billfish departed Brisbane on 12 August 1943 for her first war patrol. The Royal Australian Navy Motor Launch HMAS ML 815 escorted her into Darwin, Australia, on 18 August for an overnight stop to top off with fuel and provisions. She got back underway on 19 August 1944 and headed for her patrol area in the waters of the Japanese-occupied Netherlands East Indies.

Just after midnight on 29 August 1943, Bilfish sighted what she thought was a large, unescorted Japanese tanker in the Sulu Sea, but the tanker's zigzag course enabled her to escape into the darkness before Billfish could reach a suitable attack position. While submerged at 07°58′N 117°18′E at 12:15 that afternoon, she sighted a Japanese ship exiting Balabac Strait at a range of 5,000 yards (4,600 m) which she took to be the tanker that had eluded her earlier. She surfaced and gave chase at 19 knots (35 km/h; 22 mph). Finally in firing position at 22:17 at 08°28′N 119°36′E, she fired a spread of four torpedoes at the ship from her stern torpedo tubes. The torpedoes passed under the ship, which then turned and revealed herself to be a small warship rather than the expected deep-draft vessel for which Billfish had set the torpedoes′ depth setting. Billfish withdrew at full power and evaded the warship.

While in position 12°15′N 111°25′E at 06:21 on 8 September 1943, Billfish sighted the smoke of what turned out to be a convoy of five Japanese ships steaming in the South China Sea along the coast of Japanese-occupied French Indochina. She chased the convoy until late afternoon, when she closed to within torpedo range. At 16:38 in position 11°04′N 110°23′E she launched a spread of four torpedoes from her bow tubes, then went deep and rigged for depth charging. Her crew heard an explosion, but Japanese warships counterattacked, forcing Billfish to go as deep as 500 feet (152 m) while they dropped 15 depth charges between 16:42 and 17:10, inflicting only minor damage on Billfish. As a result, she was unable to assess the results of her attack. She claimed to have damaged one cargo ship, but postwar analysis revealed that her target, the 5,832-gross register ton Norway Maru, escaped damage.

At 08:25 hours on 25 September 1943, Billfish was at 09°38′N 111°38′E when she sighted a convoy of five Japanese ships escorted by a torpedo boat. The convoy altered course away from her at a range of 4,300 yards (3,900 m) at 09:43, preventing her from reaching an attack position. She surfaced at 12:00, reported her sighting, and began an "end around" on the convoy's right flank to get ahead of it. At 12:10, she sighted the submarine USS Bonefish (SS-223) surfacing 3 nautical miles (5.6 km; 3.5 mi) away and beginning an end around on the convoy's left flank. Meanwhile, the submarine USS Bowfin (SS-287) had heard her contact report and engaged the convoy, and at 12:14 Billfish heard a loud explosion as Bowfin torpedoed and sank the 8,120-gross register ton passenger-cargo ship Kirishima Maru. Billfish saw Bowfin surface about 3 nautical miles (5.6 km; 3.5 mi) to her north at 13:50. The convoy had scattered, so Billfish pursued the easternmost ship, and sighted two other ships at 14:00. She established radar contact on the targets at a range of 8,200 yards (7,500 m) as darkness fell, and at 19:12 was in a good position to begin an attack approach from a range of 10,000 yards (9,100 m), but the ships altered course away. She again worked ahead of them, and at position 10°49′N 113°18′E fired a spread of five torpedoes from her bow tubes at 20:03. Her crew saw a bright flash and a water column rise from the stern of one Japanese ship, which stopped, began to settle, and opened gunfire as Billfish retired to a range of 14,000 yards (13,000 m). She attempted another attack overnight, but did not achieve an attack position. Billfish claimed a torpedo hit and damage to one ship, but postwar analysis did not confirm this claim.

On 3 October 1943, Billfish made a southbound transit of Lombok Strait on the surface. She stopped at Exmouth Gulf on the coast of Western Australia to refuel on 7 October, and ended her patrol with her arrival at Fremantle, Australia, on 10 October 1943.

==== Second war patrol ====
After refit, Billfish put to sea again on 1 November 1943 to begin her second war patrol. After stopping at Exmouth Gulf on 4 November 1943 to top off with fuel, she made a submerged northbound transit of Lombok Strait on 9 November and headed through the Netherlands East Indies via the Makassar Strait and waters north of Borneo toward a patrol area in the South China Sea off the coast of French Indochina.

While she was in the Makassar Strait at 00°22′S 118°42′E at 09:20 on 11 November 1943, she sighted an approaching Japanese torpedo boat which passed her, apparently unaware of her presence. At 14:07, she sighted a destroyer or another torpedo boat and began an approach. She abandoned her approach at a range of 3,600 yards (3,300 m) at 14:50, but the vessel turned and headed toward her, so she submerged to 300 feet (91 m) and rigged for silent running and depth charging. The Japanese ship dropped six depth charges at 15:05. Billfish sustained considerable minor damage and descended to 400 feet (122 m). Six more depth charges exploded at 16:40 with Billfish at 465 feet (142 m), inflicting no additional damage. Soon thereafter, Billfish detected the arrival of a second Japanese ship, and the two ships made a combined attack with eight depth charges at 19:00. With all officers senior to him incapacitated by panic and no one manning the helm, the diving officer, Lieutenant Charles W. Rush, found himself the senior man still able to carry out his duties. After 12 continuous hours at his station as diving officer, Rush turned over control of the dive to a junior officer and assumed command. Rush realized that Billfish′s damaged fuel tanks were leaking profusely and that the Japanese undoubtedly were tracking her by the oil slick she was leaving, so, with Billfish at 580 feet (177 m), some 170 feet (52 m) below her test depth – according to Rush's award citation, although he claimed she was at 650 feet (198 m), which was 250 feet (76 m) below her test depth – he reversed course so precisely that Billfish was able to proceed back down her previous track, using the floating oil slick as cover and defeating its usefulness to the Japanese as a trail. Meanwhile, Chief Electrician's Mate John D. Rendernick took action from his battle station and led emergency repairs, which included using a hydraulic jack to reposition the port main motor, which had been knocked off its foundation, and filling a leaking stern torpedo tube with grease. Some four hours after the Japanese attack finally ceased, Billfish surfaced under the cover of darkness at 00:25 on 12 November, recharged her batteries using the single operating generator, and completed repairs. For his actions, Rush was awarded the Navy Cross on 5 April 2002. Rendernick was awarded the Navy Silver Star posthumously, and on 17 August 2004 the Naval Submarine Training Center John D. Rendernick Damage Control Wet Trainer at Pearl Harbor, Hawaii, was named in his honor.

Billfish continued her patrol. While transiting Sibutu Passage, she slipped by a Japanese antisubmarine warfare ship without harm and entered the South China Sea on 16 November 1943.

From time to time during the patrol, Billfish again teamed up with Bowfin. In the predawn darkness of 28 November 1943, Billfish detected an escorted five-ship Japanese convoy and reported the find to Bowfin. In a surface attack on the convoy, Bowfin fired a spread of four torpedoes, all of which hit and quickly sank the 2,866-gross register ton tanker Tonan Maru. Only moments later, Bowfin fired two bow torpedoes, which struck another ship, leaving its bow awash. A third ship headed for Bowfin at high speed, firing its guns at her. One shell hit Bowfin, causing considerable damage, but Bowfin fired two torpedoes from her stern tubes which sent the 5,425-gross register ton passenger-cargo ship Sydney Maru to the bottom. Out of torpedoes, Bowfin headed for Australia a short time later. Meanwhile, Billfish got into position to fire four torpedoes from her stern tubes at one of the Japanese ships still afloat after Bowfin′s attack. Though Billfish soon heard explosions, she was unable to observe the results of the attack.

While heading through the Celebes Sea toward Australia on 5 December 1943, Billfish survived a Japanese attack of 15 depth charges. Unscathed, she reached Fremantle on 24 December 1943.

==== Third war patrol ====
After a refit, Billfish got underway on 19 January 1944 and headed back to the South China Sea for her third war patrol. She transited Sibutu Passage on the evening of 1 February 1944 and at around 23:30 opened fire with her 4-inch (102 mm) gun on two Japanese "sea trucks, " a U.S. term for small Japanese cargo ships. The Japanese ships responded with erratic gunfire and scored a few hits on Billfish′s deck aft. Undamaged, Billfish set one of the ships afire and left the second listing dangerously.

On 13 February 1944, a comparatively small Japanese warship surprised Billfish on the surface and bracketed her with 4.7-inch (120 mm) gunfire, forcing her to go deep. A depth-charge attack ensued but she sustained no damage. After a final brush with a Japanese convoy on 1 March 1944, she returned to Fremantle on 24 March 1944.

==== Fourth war patrol ====
Underway again on 18 April 1944 to begin her fourth war patrol, Billfish made a stop at Darwin. She departed Darwin on 23 April 1944. At 13:37 on 24 April 1944, she detected an approaching Allied twin-engine bomber which mistook her for a Japanese submarine and responded to her recognition flare by strafing her with machine-gun fire as she crash-dived to 100 feet (30 m). She resurfaced at 14:05 and sighted the same plane, which again attacked her, attempting to drop a bomb, but the dropping mechanism locked up. Billfish again crash-dived, submerging to 150 feet (46 m). She surfaced at 14:45 and at 14:49 sighted the plane heading for Darwin. On 25 April, Billfish – which had suffered no damage or casualties – returned to Darwin, where her commanding officer and the bomber′s pilot met to discuss the incident, determining that neither Billfish or the bomber had seen each other's recognition flares and that, although Billfish was within 12 nautical miles (22 km; 14 mi) of her predicted position, the pilot had not received any information on Billfish′s whereabouts and had not expected any Allied submarines within 175 nautical miles (324 km; 201 mi) of his position.

Again departing Darwin, Billfish proceeded to a patrol area in waters between and around the Mariana Islands and Caroline Islands. On 2 May 1944, she almost closed within range of a Japanese cargo ship escorted by a destroyer and a minesweeper, but the Japanese ships made a sudden and radical change of course that prevented her from launching any torpedoes.

While running submerged on 21 May 1944, Billfish found herself in the path of a four-ship Japanese convoy escorted by four submarine chasers. Billfish worked into position to attack and fired six torpedoes at the two largest ships. According to Billfish′s patrol report, three torpedoes sent one ship to the bottom and one hit the second, severely damaging her, as depth charges forced Billfish deep, but postwar analysis of Japanese records failed to confirm the kill.

On 22 May 1943, Billfish sighted a large Japanese submarine and stalked her for six hours before reaching attack position. She then fired four torpedoes from her bow tubes. Three missed because the Japanese submarine made a last-minute course change. The fourth hung up in the tube and had to be jarred loose with a second, much heavier, blast of compressed air. The Japanese submarine submerged and escaped. Billfish′s target sometimes has been identified as I-43, but I-43 still was under construction at the time.

Billfish spotted another Japanese submarine on 26 May 1944 but failed to gain a favorable attack position. Later, after surviving two Japanese air attacks, Billfish headed for Hawaii on 5 June and reached Pearl Harbor on 13 June 1944.

==== Fifth war patrol ====
Following a hasty overhaul, Billfish departed Pearl Harbor to begin her fifth war patrol as part of a coordinated attack group under the command of Commander Stanley P. Moseley – who was embarked aboard Billfish – which also included the submarines USS Greenling (SS-213) and USS Sailfish (SS-192). The submarines stopped at Midway Atoll in the Northwestern Hawaiian Islands, then proceeded to their patrol area in the Luzon Strait. On 7 August 1944, after Sailfish reported her detection of a Japanese convoy, Billfish launched a spread of four torpedoes at a 300-foot (91 m) cargo ship from a range of 2,000 yards (1,800 m). However, the cargo ship spotted the wakes of the torpedoes and evaded them. An immediate depth-charge attack by an escort forced Billfish to go deep and prevented her from making another attack against the convoy.

Later in the patrol, several Japanese aircraft attacked Billfish, but she escaped without damage or casualties. She departed her patrol area early in September 1944 and proceeded via Saipan in the Mariana Islands to Majuro Atoll in the Marshall Islands, where she arrived on 13 September 1944.

==== Sixth war patrol ====
After refitting at Majuro Atoll, Billfish got underway on 6 October 1944 for her sixth war patrol, bound for the Volcano Islands, where she performed lifeguard duty in support of raids on the Japanese Home Islands by United States Army Air Forces B-29 Superfortress bombers based in the Mariana Islands. On 21 October 1944, she shifted to the Ryukyu Islands, where she sighted a Japanese convoy of 10 ships on the night of 4–5 November 1944. Shoal water thwarted her efforts to approach the Japanese ships for an attack.

Shortly after dawn on 7 November 1944, Billfish spotted a convoy of five Japanese merchant ships escorted by four warships and tracked them until just after 22:00 that night, when she fired three torpedoes from her bow tubes and hit two ships. Even before hearing the explosions of the torpedoes, Billfish turned around and launched four more torpedoes from her stern tubes. Her patrol report stated that two of these torpedoes exploded against the largest merchant ship in the convoy, but it was impossible for her to observe the results of the attack because the escorts struck back with depth charges and forced her down nearly to maximum depth. Postwar analysis of Japanese records failed to credit her with any sinkings on that day, although she may have severely damaged one or more ships in the convoy. Later that night, during the predawn hours of 8 November 1944, Billfish fired four more torpedoes at a 2,500-to-3,000-gross register ton two-masted ship, but the ship answered with machine-gun fire before escaping unharmed.

On 13 November 1944, Billfish sank a 40-gross register ton diesel-powered sampan with gunfire. She ended her patrol with her arrival at Pearl Harbor on 27 November 1944.

==== December 1944–March 1945 ====
On 1 December 1944, Billfish got underway from Pearl Harbor and headed for San Francisco, California. She reached San Francisco on 9 December 1944 and began an overhaul. Upon its completion, she departed San Francisco Bay on 12 March 1945 and proceeded Pearl Harbor, from which she conducted refresher training in the waters of the Hawaiian Islands.

==== Seventh war patrol ====
After completion of refresher training, Billfish departed Pearl Harbor to begin her seventh war patrol. After a stop in the Mariana Islands, she headed for a patrol area in the East China Sea to provide lifeguard service for U.S. Army Air Forces B-29 Superfortress bombers during raids on Honshu. Late in May 1945, she shifted to the Tsushima Strait area where, on 26 May 1945, one of her torpedoes sank the Japanese 991-gross register ton cargo ship Kotobuki Maru No. 7. Following an unsuccessful torpedo attack on a small Japanese coastal cargo ship two days later, Billfish scored again when two of her torpedoes sank the 2,220-gross register ton cargo ship Taiu Maru on 4 June 1945 in the Yellow Sea about 1 nautical mile (1.9 km; 1.2 mi) off the coast of the Korean Peninsula. A short time later, she surfaced and destroyed three coastal steamers with gunfire. During the action, rifle fire from the third and last schooner she attacked killed Quartermaster 1st Class Robert V. Oliver and wounded another Billfish crewman. At 12:00 on the 5 June 1945, Billfish launched a salvo of four torpedoes at a medium-sized cargo ship, but the ship's simultaneous, radical course change caused all of them to miss. As Billfish left her patrol area, a Japanese plane dove out of the sun and dropped two well-aimed depth charges that burst close aboard, violently shaking Billfish without inflicting any serious damage. She arrived safely at Midway Atoll on 17 June 1945 and began a refit there.

==== Eighth war patrol ====
Billfish got underway again on 12 July 1945, departing Midway Atoll for her eighth war patrol, which took her to Japan's home waters. Japanese shipping had become a rare commodity by this time in the war, and Billfish only achieved two significant successes during the entire patrol. On 5 August 1945, near the coast of Manchuria, three torpedoes from a salvo of four she fired hit and sank the 1,091-gross register ton cargo ship Kori Maru. On 7 August 1945, in practically the same area, she sent a considerably smaller cargo ship to the bottom with a single torpedo. She then escaped her victim's escort through skillful maneuvering in water scarcely deep enough to permit her to operate submerged. That night, while proceeding on the surface at high speed, she collided with and sank a small fishing junk.

Billfish then took up a lifeguard station off the coast of Kyushu in support of Allied airstrikes. On 15 August 1945, while on lifeguard duty, she received word of Japan's surrender that day and orders to proceed to Hawaii. She ended her wartime career with her arrival at Pearl Harbor on 27 August 1945.

=== Post-World War II ===
At Pearl Harbor, Billfish received orders to proceed to the United States Gulf Coast. After transiting the Panama Canal, she reached New Orleans, Louisiana, on 19 September 1945 and began several months of maneuvers and training in the Gulf of Mexico and in waters adjacent to the Panama Canal Zone in the Caribbean Sea.

By the late spring of 1946, Billfish was at New London. She moved to the Portsmouth Naval Shipyard at Kittery, Maine, in June 1946 for her inactivation overhaul, which was completed in October 1946. Towed back to New London by the rescue tug USS ATR-64 early in the autumn of 1946, she was decommissioned there on 1 November 1946.

From 1 January 1960 until 1 April 1968, Billfish served as a training vessel for the United States Naval Reserve, First Naval District, at the South Boston Annex of the Boston Naval Shipyard in Boston, Massachusetts, and during this duty was reclassified as an auxiliary submarine, AGSS-286, on 6 November 1962. She was struck from the Navy list on 1 April 1968 and sold on 17 March 1971 for scrapping.

== Honors and awards ==
Billfish received seven battle stars for her World War II service.
