= Lone Buffalo Winery =

Winery in California

Lone Buffalo Vineyards
- Location: 7505 Wise Road, Auburn, California, United States
- Wine region: Placer County
- Appellation: Sierra Foothills AVA
- Other labels: jbrand
- Founded: 2007
- Key people: Phillip J. Maddux (Owner/Winemaker)
- Cases/yr: 1,200
- Varietals: Zinfandel, Syrah, Tempranillo, Malbec, Pinot grigio, Grenache, Port, Mourvedre, Petite Sirah, Cabernet Sauvignon
- Distribution: regional wine club
- Tasting: Open to public
- Website: www.lonebuffalovineyards.com

Lone Buffalo Vineyards is a winery in Auburn, California in the United States.

== History ==
Lone Buffalo was started in 2007 by the Maddux family in Auburn, California. They owned a one-acre vineyard. Phil Maddux, who is the winemaker and works as a real estate lawyer, is originally from Sonoma County, California. He has studied oenology at Sonoma State University and University of California, Davis. He started making wine in 1971. He has worked under Dirk Arrowood and Cecil DeLoach. He also made his own home wine prior to opening his own winery. Maddux's wife, Jill, handles the sales, accounting, and also assists with their property management. The couples daughter, Jocelyn, is in charge of public relations. They all work in the tasting room.

The name for the winery came from Phil Maddux's fascination with the American bison. He believes that the comeback of the American bison from near extinction is similar to the comeback that the Sierra Foothills region is attempting to make after its decline in economic success after the Prohibition closed many wineries in the area. The bison is depicted on the wine labels and the wine names have an American West theme. They also make a brand titled "jbrand" which is co-created by Phil and Jocelyn. It is an attempt to make wine of interest to younger consumers.

It took the company three years before they brought in a profit. The majority of their sales come from tasting room visits, online sales, and wine club memberships. They also distribute their wine to regional restaurants and businesses. In January 2013, Lone Buffalo opened a new tasting room northwest of Auburn. It took them three years to find and acquire the property. The new property and facility is larger than the previous, with 12 acres. The facility is 2,400 square feet in size and is modeled after a ranch. The new location allowed them to crush their grapes and complete the entire winemaking process in the same place, unlike the previous building. It is located in the Sierra Foothills AVA and is part of the Placer County Wine Trail.

== Wine production ==
They produce approximately 1,200 bottles per year, as of 2013. One-third of the wine they produce is estate grown. Estate grown grapes include zinfandel and petit syrah. The rest of the grapes they source come throughout Placer County. Their most widely distributed wine is a Rhône wine called "Where the Buffalo Roam." It is a blend of grenache, mourvedre, and syrah. They also make a port wine called "Pawnee Tawny" which is made of grapes from Madera County, California. The jbrand is small production and consists grenache, syrah and pinot grigio wines.

== Recognition ==
- 2010

- Where the Buffalo Roam blend (2008) - Gold Medal - California State Fair Wine Competition

- 2012

- Thunder Beast Zinfandel - Gold Medal - San Francisco Chronicle Wine Competition

- 2013

- Thunder Beast Zinfandel (2010) - Gold Medal - San Francisco Chronicle Wine Competition
- Tatonka Tempranillo (2010) - Silver Medal - San Francisco Chronicle Wine Competition
- Bison Blanc Viognier (2011) - Silver Medal - San Francisco Chronicle Wine Competition
- Where the Buffalo Roam blend (2010) - Bronze Medal - San Francisco Chronicle Wine Competition
- Noble Beast Cabernet Sauvignon (2010) - Bronze Medal - San Francisco Chronicle Wine Competition

- 2014

- Where the Buffalo Roam (2011) - Silver Medal - San Francisco Chronicle Wine Competition
- Grenache (2011) - Bronze Medal - San Francisco Chronicle Wine Competition
- Noble Beast Cabernet Sauvignon (2011) - Bronze Medal - San Francisco Chronicle Wine Competition
