= California Shenandoah Valley AVA =

Viticultural area in California, US

Coordinates: 38°32′19″N 120°47′35″W

California Shenandoah Valley
- Wine region
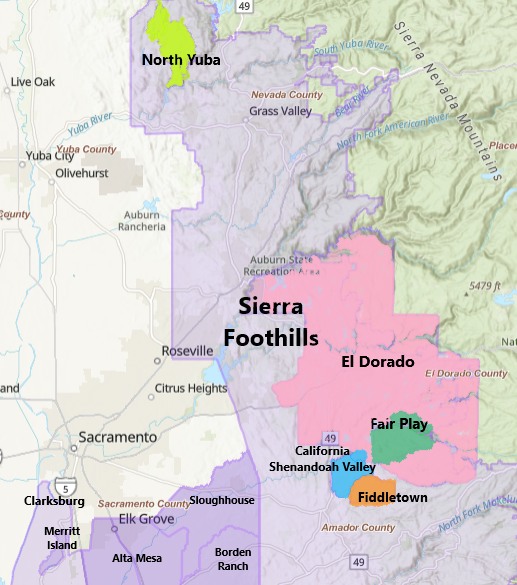
- Type: American Viticultural Area
- Year established: 1982; 1987 Amended
- Years of wine industry: 186
- Country: United States
- Part of: California, Sierra Foothills AVA
- Other regions in California, Sierra Foothills AVA: El Dorado AVA, Fair Play AVA, Fiddletown AVA, North Yuba AVA
- Soil conditions: Sierra series, well-drained and moderately deep soil formed from granite rock
- Total area: 10,000 acres (16 sq mi)
- Size of planted vineyards: 2,000 acres (809 ha)
- Grapes produced: Aglianico, Alicante Bouschet, Barbera, Black Muscat, Cabernet Sauvignon, Chardonnay, Chenin Blanc, Grenache, Merlot, Mission, Montepulciano, Muscat Canelli , Nebbiolo, Orange Muscat, Petite Sirah, Pinot Gris, Primitivo, Roussanne, Sangiovese, Sauvignon Blanc, Semillon, Syrah, Verdelho, Viognier, Zinfandel
- No. of wineries: 28+

California Shenandoah Valley is an American Viticultural Area (AVA) located within portions of Amador County and El Dorado County, California. The area was established as the nation's 24^{th} and the state's sixteenth appellation on December 26, 1982 by the Bureau of Alcohol, Tobacco and Firearms (ATF), Treasury after reviewing the petition submitted by the Amador County Wine Grape Growers Association proposing a viticultural area in Amador County to be named "Shenandoah Valley." It lies within the vast multi-county Sierra Foothills viticultural area boundaries and borders the northwest boundary of Fiddletown viticultural area which was established the following year. The petition states the area is approximately 10,000 acres (16 sq mi) cultivating about1,200 acres (486 ha) under vine. The petitioner requested ATF that Shenandoah Valley viticultural area be situated to the north and west of Fiddletown, and to the north and east of Plymouth.

== History ==
The region was originally occupied by the Maidu, Nisenan, Washoe, and Miwok Indigenous American tribes prior to the nineteenth century. It became historically famous for being the site of the 1848 discovery that sparked the California Gold Rush. The County of El Dorado was one of California's original 27 counties created in 1850 whose name is derived from Spanish meaning "The Gilded One." The area derived the name "Shenandoah Valley" from settlers who came from the Virginia locale whose geography was similar to their new home. In Amador County, the new immigrants began planting grapevines and producing wine. In 1866, the number of grape-vines was estimated at 557,773; in 1867, at 1,140,000; 1868, at 683,623.

The valley produced Zinfandel grapes throughout the late 1800s, but did not experience a wine boom until well into the 1960s. During the 1960s and 1970s, most of the grapes were sold to jug wine producers. The initial steps to creating an viticulture identity began in the late 1970s, when Sutter Home Winery used Shenandoah Valley's distinctive Zinfandel fruit to make a regionally-labeled wine. The most important grape variety in the region is Zinfandel, with Primitivo and Barbera close behind.

== Name ==
Regarding the proposed area name, the petition stated and witnesses testified, among other things, that:

- (a) In 1881, 1. D. Mason, in his "History of Amador County," mentions choice grapes being grown in the Shenandoah Valley;
- (b) A 1927 book, "Amador County History" refers to this area as Shenandoah Valley;
- (c) Soil survey maps of Amador County, California, prepared by the U.S. Department of Agriculture Soil Conservation Service and dated Series 1961, identify the area as the Shenandoah Valley;
- (d) U.S.G.S. 7.5 minute quadrangle map, (topographic) titled Fiddletown Quadrangle California and dated 1949, identifies the area as the Shenandoah Valley;
- (e) An area school, cemetery and road has "Shenandoah" included in their names; and
- (f) Numerous articles, books and other materials dealing with wine refer to the Shenandoah Valley in California as a specific grape-growing area.

The major issue in most of the 300 written comments and in the testimony of over 80 persons at two public hearings was use of the name "Shenandoah Valley" for a viticultural area. About half of the commenters said that the Shenandoah Valley name is historically and geographically best known for a valley in Virginia and West Virginia. They claimed the use of Shenandoah Valley on California wine labels would be confusing for consumers and would allow the California wine industry use of a name which has significance for the Virginia wine industry. The other half of the commenters stated that the Shenandoah Valley name in California has existed for over 100 years as have commercial vineyards and wine production in this area. They contend use of Shenandoah Valley on these wine labels would not confuse the consumer because such wines are nationally well known and distinctly different from wine produced from grapes grown in the Shenandoah Valley of Virginia and West Virginia. After a careful review of the name issue, ATF decided that the evidence shows that the name of the proposed viticultural area, "Shenandoah Valley," is locally known as referring to a specific area in California and this area is nationally known as a specific grape growing area. However, two geographic areas share the same name, one in California and the other in Virginia and West Virginia where both cultivate wine grapes. The record established that the Shenandoah Valley in Virginia and West Virginia is nationally well known, whereas the Shenandoah Valley in California is less well known. ATF believed there would be a potential for consumer confusion if the name "Shenandoah Valley" without qualification were displayed on a California wine label. Because the Shenandoah Valley in Virginia and West Virginia is so well known, ATF believed the consumer would consider a wine labeled with an unqualified Shenandoah Valley viticultural area as originating from grapes grown in this area. ATF further believed that the use of the name "Shenandoah Valley" in direct conjunction with the name of the State of California would eliminate the potential for consumer confusion and allows consumers to readily identify where the wine originates. Therefore, this final rule allows the name Shenandoah Valley as a viticultural area in California provided that the name California appears in direct conjunction with the name Shenandoah Valley on the wine label.

== Boundaries ==
Another issue with the proposed California Shenandoah Valley viticultural area was a petition from Twin Rivers Vineyards to extend the northern boundary of the Amador County Wine Grape Growers Association's petition to include 170 acres (69 ha) of grapes in El Dorado County. A number of commenters gave their opinion and belief that the Shenandoah Valley stopped at the Amador and El Dorado County line. However, there was evidence that while the proposed extension lay fallow for several years until recently. The early settlers living on the property were regarded as Shenandoah Valley residents. Other commenters gave economic reasons for limiting the Shenandoah Valley viticultural area to Amador County. A viticultural area is defined as a delimited grape growing region distinguishable by geographical features. The similarity of environmental factors influencing the grapes in a region is far more important than real or imagined boundary lines or economic factors. The one geographical feature which separates the two Counties is a 400 feet (120 m) wide river canyon. However, grapes are not planted in this river canyon. The evidence shows that the topography, soil type and microclimate on both sides of the river canyon are similar. Further, testimony at the hearing showed that north of the proposed extension the land was no longer Sierra soil series, and was implantable, steep, treed and rocky. Based on the evidence, ATF believed that the environmental factors influencing the grapes in the petition for Shenandoah Valley viticultural area in Amador County are the same as for the adjacent 170 acres (69 ha) vineyard located in El Dorado County. Further, based on the evidence, ATF believed the proposed area, as extended, is geographically distinguishable from the surrounding areas. Therefore, the northern boundary of the Amador County Wine Grape Growers Association's petition was extended to include Twin Rivers Vineyards. Other than the addition of the Twin Rivers Vineyard's property, ATF approved the boundaries of the California Shenandoah Valley as proposed. This decision was based on the petition, the testimony presented at the hearing, and comments received.

== Terroir ==
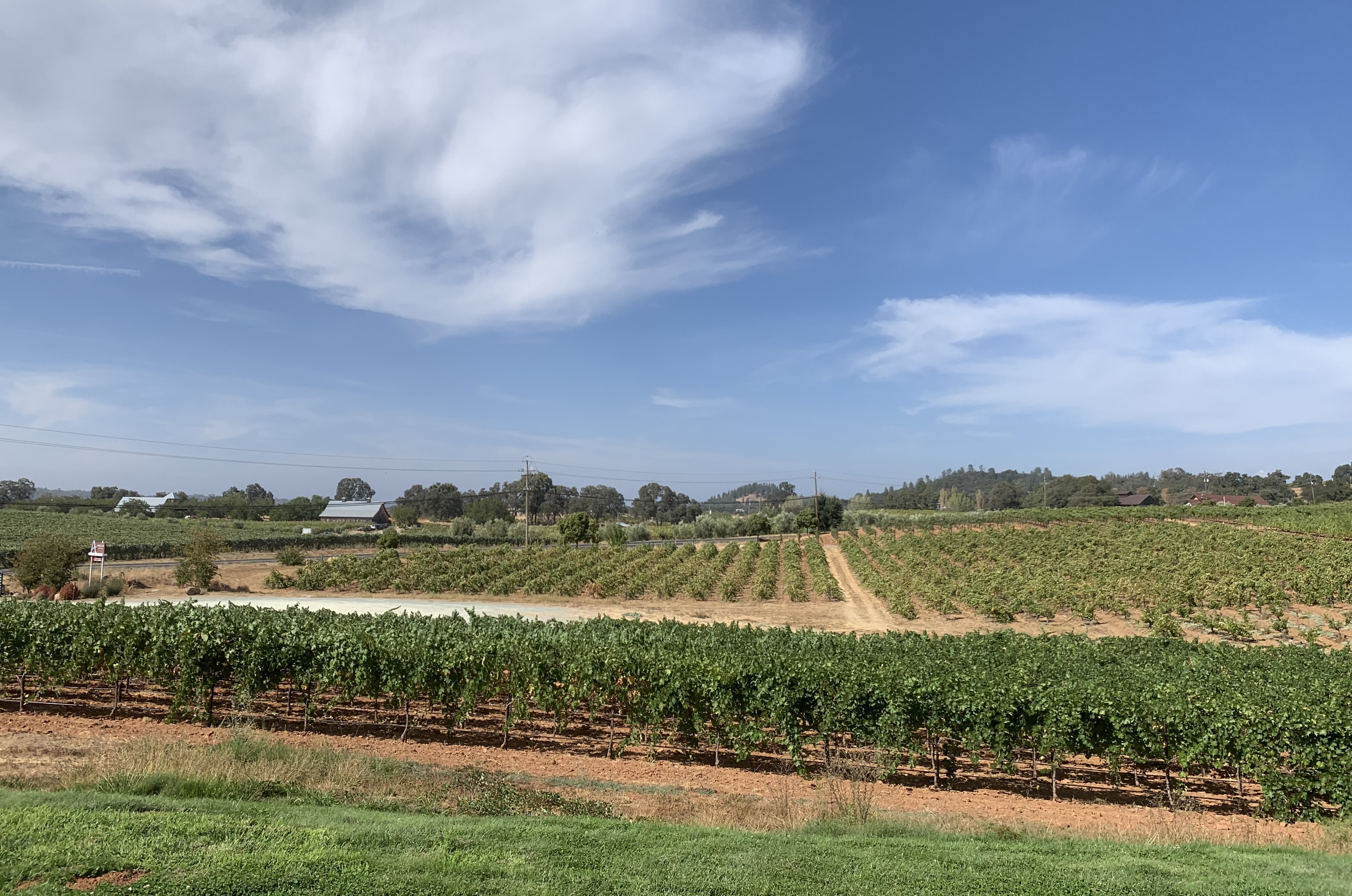
California Shenandoah Valley vineyard, River Pines

=== Topography ===
A viticultural area is defined as a delimited grape growing region distinguishable by geographical features. The similarity of environmental factors influencing the grapes in a region is far more important than real or imagined boundary lines or economic factors. The one geographical feature which separates the two counties is a 400 feet (122 m) wide river canyon. However, grapes are not planted in this river canyon. The evidence shows that the topography, soil type and microclimate on both sides of the river canyon are similar. Further, testimony at the hearing showed that north of the proposed extension the land was no longer Sierra soil series, was implantable, steep, treed and rocky. Based on the evidence, ATF believes that the environmental factors influencing the grapes in the petition for Shenandoah Valley viticultural area in Amador County are the same as for the adjacent 170 acres (69 ha) vineyard located in El Dorado County. Further, ATF believed the proposed area, as extended, was geographically distinguishable from the surrounding areas. Therefore, the northern boundary of the Amador County Wine Grape Growers Association's petition was extended to include Twin Rivers Vineyards.

=== Climate ===
As the area has a relatively low elevation (around 1,400 feet (427 m) above sea level), the climate is less influenced by the Sierra Nevada mountains than some neighboring areas. Consequently, it has one of the hottest climates in the region. The combination of the hot, dry climate and the soil conditions means that California Shenandoah Valley wines are generally rich and complex. The USDA plant hardiness zone ranges from 9a to 9b.

=== Soil ===
The soil is largely made up of decomposed granite and sandy loam. Well drained and infertile, it is excellent for growing wine grapes. The vines are forced to dig down deeper roots to get to water and the result is fewer berries with more-concentrated flavors. The petition states that the principal grape producing soil in the California Shenandoah Valley is the Sierra series. This series consists of well-drained deep and moderately deep soils formed of material from granitic rock. These soils are gently sloping to very steep. The surface soil primarily consists of various loams, particularly coarse sandy loam. The subsoil primarily consists of heavy loam or clay loam. The depth to weathered bedrock ranges from 20 inches to more than 60 inches. Witnesses stated that to the west of the area the soil is the Auburn-Exchaquer series which is rocky and shallow, to the east the soil is the Supan-Iron Mountain series which is a volcanic type rock, and to the south the soil is shallower range land.

== Sources ==
- Balzer, Robert Lawrence; Geis, Darlene (January 1, 1978). Wines of California. New York: Abrams. ISBN 978-0810907508.
