= Charles W. Rush =

United States Navy captain

Charles W. Rush Jr.
- Born: March 18, 1919; Greensboro, Alabama, U.S.
- Died: February 27, 2015 (age 95); Port Saint Lucie, Florida, U.S.
- Occupations: Submarine Captain, US Navy Retired

Charles W. Rush, Jr. (March 18, 1919 – February 27, 2015) was a United States Navy captain who served during World War II and the Korean War. During World War II, Rush saved the entire crew of the submarine USS Billfish from a November 1943 depth charge attack by three Japanese destroyers. His actions remained hidden for nearly 60 years before he was honored with the Navy Cross in 2002 for his actions. Rush served on the USS Thresher, USS Carbonero, and USS Billfish and served in command of the submarines USS Queenfish and USS Blackfin before retiring from the Navy in 1961. Rush developed a number of submarine-launched missiles, including a notable high-speed wake-less torpedo.

== Early life and education ==
"Charlie," son of Charles W. Rush, Sr. and Dorothy McFaddin, was born in Greensboro, Alabama on March 18, 1919. Rush spent his youth in Dothan, Alabama, where he attended public school. In 1935, he was awarded a scholarship to Gulf Coast Military Academy in Gulfport, Mississippi. He graduated from GCMA in 1937 with highest honors and received an appointment to the Naval Academy from the Secretary of the Navy.

He graduated from the Naval Academy a year early in the aftermath of the World War II attacks on Pearl Harbor, Hawaii. After the Pearl Harbor attack, there was an immediate and desperate need for naval officers in the Pacific, and the Naval Academy cut the "usual four year matriculation to three." He was immediately signed as an officer upon his early graduation.

Post-World War II, Rush attended graduate school at Caltech in aeronautical engineering.

== Career and awards ==
=== Early career ===
After graduation from the Naval Academy on February 7, 1941, Rush served on destroyers in the Pacific Ocean until he volunteered for submarine duty while in Pearl Harbor, Hawaii. His first assignment as a Naval Officer was on the aircraft carrier USS Enterprise as a torpedo officer.

He would later be assigned to the submarines USS Thresher as torpedo officer and USS Billfish for seven war patrols in the South Pacific and East Indies.

=== USS Billfish ===
On November 11, 1943, USS Billfish was attacked by three Japanese destroyers in the Makassar Strait over a period of 12 hours. One of the destroyers severely damaged USS Billfish with a depth charge attack of 650 feet (200 m), approximately 250 feet (76 m) below the submarine's test depth. The Billfish's aft pressure hull was ruptured and the boat began taking on water. The ship's batteries also began releasing poisonous gases throughout the ship, depleting the supply of fresh oxygen.

These attacks rendered the captain and all senior officers unable to take action. Lieutenant Rush assumed command of the ship and devised a plan to escape the attack. Realizing that the boat's damaged fuel tanks were leaking profusely and that the destroyers were undoubtedly tracking their location by following the boat's oil slick on the surface, he took the boat to an unprecedented depth and reversed course so precisely he was able to proceed backwards through the oil slick's path, evading the three destroyers above. In the face of seemingly certain death, Rush saved the submarine and the entire crew. His efforts were aided by two crew members, Chief Electrician's Mate John D. Rendernick and Engineman Charley Odom, who immediately sprang into action after Rush took command. Rendernick and Odom fixed the engine using a hydraulic jack against the pressure hull, permitting the ship to leave the area of attack. Additionally, they slowed some of the leaks that had sprung in the ship. Both crew members would later go on to be awarded the Navy Silver Star for their heroic actions during the attack.

However, the actions of Rush, Rendernick and Odom would remain hidden for several decades. "At the time, Billfish's patrol report falsified the chaos on board during the depth-charge attack and Rush promised to keep the details secret on the condition that the skipper, Frederic Colby Lucas, Jr. resign." Rush and Lucas made a gentleman's agreement that Lucas would retire to surface ships as he "cracked" during the twelve-hour depth charge, retiring to his private chambers during the attack. Lucas resigned from submarine duty upon returning to port.

Rush's actions have been detailed closely in the time since his actions were finally revealed to and documented by the Navy. Rush was featured on the television show War Stories with Oliver North episode "Silent Warriors: Submarines of the Pacific". Additionally, several chapters of the book War Beneath the Waves: A True Story of Courage and Leadership Aboard a World War II Submarine, written by Don Keith, document in heavy detail Rush's actions during the 12-hour depth charge attack.

=== Navy Cross award ===
Several decades after Rush's actions on the Billfish, many members of the crew began a campaign to document Rush's actions during the attack, as they had remained secret to protect the commanding officers on board.

In November 2002, nearly 60 years later after Rush's heroic actions, he was awarded the Navy Cross in a ceremony at Naval Station Pearl Harbor. This was the first time the honor had been bestowed upon someone other than a commanding officer.

=== Post-military career ===
In 1961, Rush retired from the United States Navy. He attended graduate school at Caltech in aeronautical engineering in Pasadena, California.

Rush developed a number of submarine-launched missiles, including a notable high-speed wake-less torpedo. Rush was involved in the UUM-44 Subroc Missile System, a submarine-launched rocket, and consulted on the polar passage of the USS Nautilus, "the first submarine to complete an under-ice voyage to the North Pole."

Later in his career, he worked for North American Aviation and also began a defense consulting firm, working with the Department of Defense and Rockwell International.

Rush wrote a handful of books, including The Complete Book of Submarines (with W. C. Chambliss, 1958) and a submarine-themed fiction novel, Striker's Men (1994).

== Personal life and retirement ==
Rush was a member of the Royal Ocean Racing Club, Sons of the American Revolution, and United States Submarine Veterans of World War II. In October 1976, Rush married his wife LaVonne at the Naval Academy. They had homes in Washington, D.C., and Port Saint Lucie, Florida. In retirement, Rush and his wife sailed throughout the Bahamas and Caribbean.
