= Fellowship of Friends =

California-based religious organization

- Formation: January 1, 1970
- Founder: Robert Earl Burton
- Type: New religious movement
- Legal status: Non-profit religious corporation
- Headquarters: Oregon House, CA, USA
- Region served: California, USA
- Members: Over 1,500 (2022)
- Official language: English
- Affiliations: ICCC
- Website: livingpresence.com

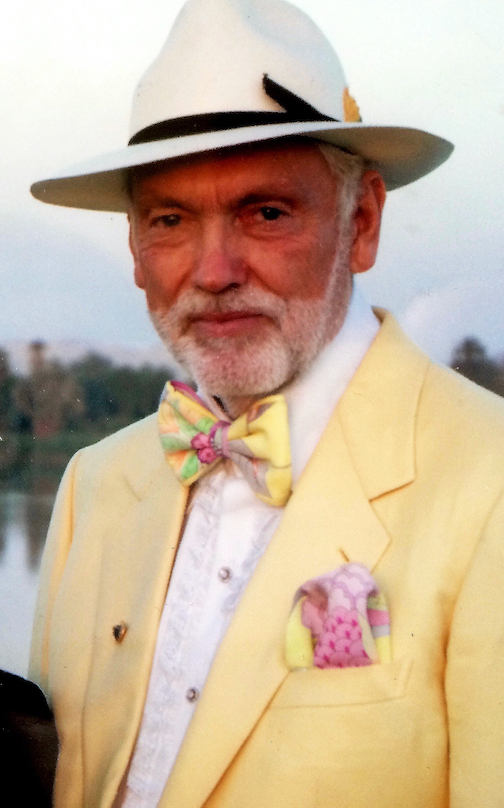
Robert Earl Burton, the founder of the Fellowship of Friends

The Fellowship of Friends, also known as Living Presence and the Fourth Way School, is a non-denominational, new religious organization that has been labelled a cult by critics, ex-members and some academics.

== Membership and finances ==
As of 2022, the organization had over 1,500 members, over 600 of whom live in or near the organization's 1200-acre (48 ha) compound named "Apollo" in Oregon House, California, United States. Members also reside in North and South America, Europe and Asia.

Members are generally expected to tithe 10% of their income to the organization. In 1994, the organization's chief financial officer stated that the organization had a yearly income of greater than $5 million. Their total assets were estimated at around $26 million in 1996. In 1996, the organization auctioned its collection of over 100 pieces of antique Chinese furniture, held under the Museum of Classical Chinese Furniture, at Christie's, and received $11.2 million for it.

== Legal status ==
The Fellowship of Friends is registered as a 501(c)(3) California non-profit church organization and is a member of the International Council of Community Churches (ICCC).

== Beliefs and doctrine ==
The organization was founded in 1970 by Robert Earl Burton as a Fourth Way group based on the teachings of early 20th century Russian philosophers George Gurdjieff (d. 1949) and his disciple Peter Ouspensky, but presently incorporates additional esoteric beliefs not directly connected with the Fourth Way system.

Members believe that most people normally exist in a state of "waking sleep," and that the way to a higher consciousness is through self-awareness, a positive attitude, and engagement in the fine arts.

Burton considers one of his roles as a conduit for teaching ideas communicated to him by 44 beings he calls angels, who are the immortal spirits of men who have achieved awakening, including Abraham Lincoln, Johann Sebastian Bach, Jesus Christ, Leonardo da Vinci, Plato, and Walt Whitman.

This mission is twofold: to create the seed of a new civilization after the catastrophic doom that Burton has predicted since the early days of the organization, though the dates have been changed as each prediction has not been fulfilled, and to create consciousness in the members of the organization.

It is unrelated to the "Society of Friends" (aka Quakers), a religious group founded in the 1600s in the English Midlands and any similarities are purely coincidental.

== Renaissance Vineyard and Winery ==
From 1982 to 2015 the organization operated Renaissance Vineyard and Winery at the Apollo settlement. The vineyard was planted with advice from viticultural consultant Karl Werner, who married a Fellowship of Friends member and became a member himself. The Fellowship obtained designation of the North Yuba American Viticultural Area in 1985.

== Criticisms ==
In lawsuits that were settled out of court, two former members sued Burton, in 1984 and 1996 alleging that Burton used his position to sexually prey upon young men. About 100 members left the group after each of these allegations. Numerous other members have shared similar stories of Burton's activities.

Burton has also been criticized for having a lavish lifestyle and for false prophecies. "Burton also has predicted that Apollo will be the lone surviving outpost after a global nuclear holocaust in 2006. Disillusioned former members say the fellowship is more than just another California curiosity. A growing number of them--as well as some academics--call it a cult that entraps its mostly well-educated members with a false promise of spiritual evolution."

In 2006, an attendee at a Fellowship of Friends prospective student meeting wrote a report of his experience and posted it on a WordPress site. This became a focus for many former members to air their views, and led to a lively discussion of the practices of the organization and its founder. It has passed through a number of moderators and platforms, and continues to exist as of 2022.

In 2021, Jennings Brown, an independent reporter, created a series of Podcasts on the Revelations site hosted by Spotify that are the result of an extensive investigation into the Fellowship of Friends.

In 2022, a lawsuit was filed against Google and its staffing firm Advanced Systems Group (ASG) which alleged that Fellowship of Friends members used the contracting agency as an easier way to hire others from the same group without the normal scrutiny applied to full-time Google hires. In the suit, Kevin Lloyd, a former Google video producer, alleges he was fired because he complained about the influence of the religious group in his business unit. The suit alleges that Google Developer Studio (GDS), which makes videos promoting the company's products, is run by Peter Lubbers, a Fellowship of Friends member who used his position to hire many members of the group and their relatives, and to feed some of Google's spending on video production to the group. In a similar lawsuit from 2008, Lynn Noyes was awarded $6.5 million in damages from Kelly Services for failing to promote her because she was not part of the Fellowship. Lloyd settled his lawsuit against ASG in December 2022, with terms undisclosed; Google confirmed at that time that Lubbers was no longer employed at the company, without explaining his departure.
