= Le Casque Winery =

American Wine Club

- Location: 9280 Horseshoe Bar Road, Loomis, California, United States
- Wine region: Placer County
- Appellation: Sierra Foothills AVA
- Founded: 2006
- First vintage: 2008
- Opened to the public: 2013
- Key people: Kevin Stevenson (Owner), Tim Weyrich (Winemaker)
- Known for: Adrian proprietary red Cabernet Franc; Cabernet Sauvignon
- Varietals: Cabernet Franc, Cabernet Sauvignon, Grenache, Malbec, Petite Sirah, Port, Roussanne, Sauvignon Blanc, Viognier, Syrah, Marsanne, Picpoul Blanc
- Distribution: regional wine club
- Tasting: Open to public
- Website: casquewine.com

Le Casque Winery is a winery in Loomis, California in the United States. Le Casque Winery is located within the Sierra Foothills AVA and more specifically within Placer County.

== History ==
Le Casque Wines was founded in 2006 by the Stevenson family in Loomis, California. The first release of Le Casques wines was in 2008. The winery opened at the end of 2010 and the tasting room at the Flower Farm opened in 2013. Kevin Stevenson, the owner and original winemaker had been a systems analyst, musician, and music producer prior to getting into winemaking. Kevin spent eight years tending Cabernet Franc vineyards before opening Le Casque wines production facility in 2010.

In 2013 Le Casque opened a tasting room at the Flower Farm and Cafe in February 2013. Soon thereafter Tim Weyrich joined as Winemaker.

Le Casque has won a number of awards including Double Gold and Best in Class at the San Francisco Chronicle Wine Competition in Cloverdale.

== Varietals ==
They produce eight different red varietals as well as a number of whites
