= Fiddletown AVA =

Viticultural area in California, USA

Coordinates: 38°32′46″N 120°43′21″W

Fiddletown
- Wine region
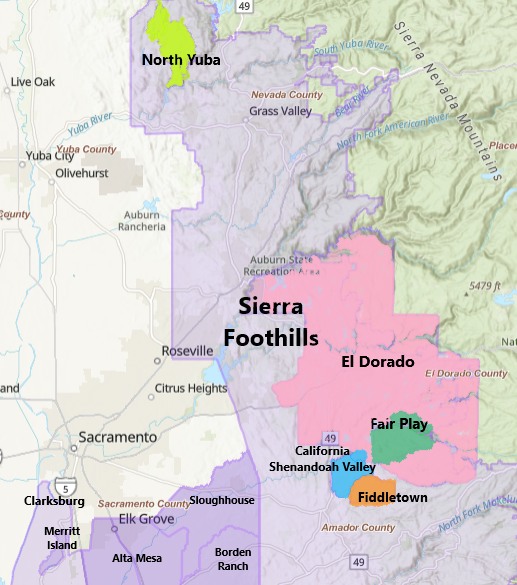
- Type: American Viticultural Area
- Year established: 1983; 1987 Amended
- Country: United States
- Part of: California, Sierra Foothills AVA
- Other regions in California, Sierra Foothills AVA: California Shenandoah Valley AVA, El Dorado AVA, Fair Play AVA, North Yuba AVA
- Climate region: Region III-IV
- Precipitation (annual average): 30 to 40 inches (762–1,016 mm)
- Soil conditions: Sierra-Ahwahee and Sites series; deep loam of decomposed granite
- Total area: 11,500 acres (18 sq mi)
- Size of planted vineyards: 310 acres (125 ha)
- Grapes produced: Barbera, Grenache, Mourvedre, Petite Sirah, Syrah, Tempranillo, and Zinfandel
- No. of wineries: 4

Fiddletown is an American Viticultural Area (AVA) in Amador County, California, United States. It was established as the nation's 43^{rd}, the state's 28^{th} and the county's second appellation on October 4, 1983, by the Bureau of Alcohol, Tobacco and Firearms (ATF), Treasury after reviewing the petition submitted by the Fiddletown Wine Grape Growers in Amador County proposing the viticultural area to be named "Fiddletown."

The 11,500-acre (18 sq mi) viticultural area is considered the upper Amador wine growing region, as it sits at a higher elevation to both the Shenandoah Valley AVA, anchored by the towns of Plymouth and Sutter Creek, and the wineries that run along eastern State Route 16 to State Route 49, more centered around Ione. Most of the vineyards in the Fiddletown AVA are located in the south and west portion of the region on Sierra Nevada slopes between 1,500 to 2,500 feet (457–762 m) above sea level. At the outset, there was approximately 1,000 acres (405 ha) suitable for vineyard development and the present 310 acres (125 ha) of cultivation are scattered throughout the Fiddletown viticultural area where about 20% of the Amador County vintages are produced.

== History ==
Historically, as all wine regions of the Sierra Nevada foothills, was populated in the 1850s by settlers seeking their fortunes in the California Gold Rush. In Amador County, settlers who stayed in the area eventually planted grape vines to produce wine which became abundant by the end of the nineteenth century. In 1866, the number of grapevines was estimated at 557,773; in 1867, at 1,140,000; and 1868, at 683,623. The valley produced Zinfandel grapes throughout the late 1800s, but did not experience a wine boom until well into the 1960s. During the 1960s and 1970s, most of the grapes were sold to jug wine producers when the area became a growing retirement region, and the expanse of the population centers of the Central Valley and adjacent Nevada added significant enotourism to the area. With this resurgence of local wine buyers, the regions of interior California, especially the Sierra Foothills, started a new viticulture resurgence and wine making.

Fiddletown, which got its name because the young men of the town were always "fiddling" around, was briefly changed to the name of Oleta. But Fiddletown was immortalized in a story by Bret Harte, and the original name was restored in 1920.
Fiddletown viticultural area is more high mountain grapes, with Syrah and related Rhone varietals doing well, and traditional Italian grapes such as Barbera, Tempranillo and Zinfandel being the historical favorites of the greater region. Grapes traditionally making up Bordeaux wine, such as Cabernet Sauvignon, Cabernet Franc are grown all across the region, just less common. Dominant white varietals grown in the region are Viognier, Grenache Blanc, Albarino, Rousanne, and others. Some vineyards in this area can stretch to over 3,000 feet above sea level creating a distinct difference to the lower elevations. A few celebrated winemakers especially focus on this area. A winery collective and store exists known as Amador 360 Winery Collective provides a diverse introduction specifically to this AVA.

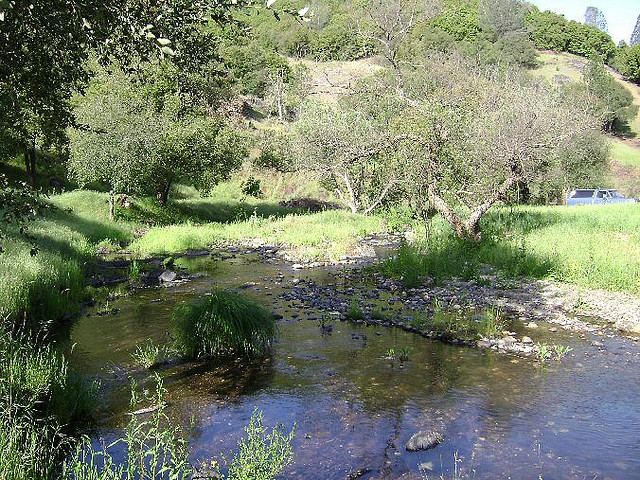
Creek running through the Fiddletown wine region

== Terroir ==
=== Topography ===
Fiddletown area differs from the neighboring Shenandoah Valley of California viticultural area because of its higher elevations of 1,500 to 2,500 feet (457–762 m), colder nighttime temperatures and a higher rainfall of 30 to 40 inches (762–1,016 mm) per year. The area surrounding the north and east boundaries is above 2,500 ft (762 m) and for the most part, too rugged a terrain and too cold for growing grapes.

=== Climate ===
The summer daytime temperatures range from the eighties to one hundred degrees, and nights are cool from breezes from the surrounding mountains. The grapes are grown without any irrigation, and vines produce from one and a half to three short tons (1–3 t) per acre. The USDA plant hardiness zones range from 9a to 9b.

=== Soils ===
Most of the grapes are grown on the southern and western rolling slopes of the hills in the area where the soil is a deep loam of decomposed granite. The soils of the Fiddletown viticultural area are Sierra-Ahwahee and Sites series which are deep, moderately well drained and consist of loams or sandy loams.

== Wineries ==
Damas Vineyards is one of the few wineries that places Fiddletown AVA on their labels. The AVA wine bottles usually are labelled with the "Amador County" appellation. The county access roads to the area's wineries and retail outlets are primarily in the California Shenandoah Valley viticultural area on Shenandoah Road while further south is the Fiddletown area, east of Plymouth, is Fiddletown Road. California Shenandoah Valley AVA has a more complete list of wineries that span both roads.
