= Nancy Gooch =

African American settler in California

Nancy Gooch (c. 1811 – September 17, 1901) was an early African American settler in California and one of the state's most successful 19th-century black female landowners. Gooch gained her freedom when California entered the Union as a free state in 1850.

== From Maryland to California ==
Nancy Gooch was born an enslaved person in Maryland in about 1811 (it varies based on the census year; her gravestone says 1811). Later on, she was moved to Missouri. After working in the fields for a few years in Missouri, Gooch and her husband Peter were moved to California by their enslaver, William Gooch. However, left behind was Gooch's three-year-old son Andrew, who later on was purchased by a Missouri family named Monroe. Once the Gooches got to California and gained their freedom, Nancy began to do laundry and other domestic chores for the miners in California. She lived in a small shack that barely cost her any money. This way, she could begin to gather up enough money to buy her son's freedom. Throughout their entire journey, Nancy and Peter had one thing in mind: to get their son to California. Peter died in 1861. But Nancy kept working, and while slavery had been abolished by the time she had amassed the seven hundred dollars needed, she was able to pay for her son's family to move to California in 1870, and continue to cultivate the land she had bought with her husband.

== California settlement ==
Nancy Gooch was one of the first African American women to become wealthy in California. Gooch and her husband got to Coloma, California, in 1849, and by 1850 began working at the gold-mining location. While doing domestic chores for the miners, the couple earned enough money to buy 80 acres of land in 1858, a year after they were wed. Eventually, these 80 acres (32 ha) grew into 320 acres (130 ha), including land at the gold discovery site at Sutter's Mill.

The couple also had a good relationship with James Marshall, who worked at Sutter's Mill. Marshall is credited with reporting the finding of gold in California in 1848. California took some of the Monroe's landholdings from Andrew Monroe's son, which included the original site of Sutter's Mill and the site of Marshall's gold discovery. That land was the foundation of the Marshall Gold Discovery State Historic Park, and the Monroe/Gooch family is buried in the park's pioneer cemetery.
