= Gulf Coast Military Academy =

Defunct military school in Mississippi

Coordinates: 30°23′17″N 89°01′00″W

Gulf Coast Military Academy

The Gulf Coast Military Academy (GCMA) was a military school in Mississippi. It was founded in 1912 by Colonel James Chappel Hardy in Gulfport, Mississippi. It ceased operation in 1976. After severe damage in 2005 from Hurricane Katrina, a small part of the facility was restored and became a site for the Armed Forces Museum.

== History ==
This preparatory school for boys was founded in 1912. The senior division campus closed in 1951, and became the site of the Armed Forces Retirement Home-Gulfport, formerly known as the United States Naval Home.

The Senior Branch of the academy was closed in 1952, and the grounds were purchased by the federal government. The Senior Branch grounds and buildings became the property of the U.S. Air Force, and was designated as Keesler Annex #3. The former Senior Academy facilities were initially used as technical training headquarters for Keesler Air Force Base and the old Academy Chow Hall became the Base Chapel.

Officer training was conducted in electronics for communications, ground electronics (radar), and weapons controller assignments. Many of the former academy buildings were used for classrooms, administration, and storage.

In 1973, the former Senior Academy grounds and facilities were transferred to the U.S. Navy. At that time, the Navy Retirement Home was moved to the former academy grounds. Later, the Navy Home was re-designated as part of the Armed Forces Retirement Home (AFRH).

The Junior Branch (grades 1–9) remained open through the summer session of 1976 when the president and owner of the academy, Col. Charles M. Holt, closed the school and sold the remaining property and buildings to William Carey College in Hattiesburg, Mississippi. It opened as "William Carey on the Coast" in 1976 with roughly 300 students.

In 2005, the facilities were severely damaged by Hurricane Katrina and all the residents of the retirement home and college were moved to other locations.

The damaged AFRH was scheduled to be demolished in 2020.

The cornerstone to the old office complex, the former C & D Companies and the administration offices were salvaged. The facility was transferred to the Armed Forces Museum, at Camp Shelby, Mississippi. The grounds of both the Senior and Junior Academies are now empty.

== Notable alumni ==
- Virgil Lawrence "Spud" Davis
- Frank Burton Ellis
- William Russell Kelly
- Forrest S. McCartney
- Charles W. Rush
- Hewitt T. Wheless
- E. O. Wilson
