= Fair Play, California =

Unincorporated community in California, United States

Fair Play
- Unincorporated community
- Location in California Fair Play (the United States)
- Coordinates: 38°35′37″N 120°39′38″W
- Country: United States
- State: California
- County: El Dorado
- Elevation: 2,330 ft (710 m)

Fair Play (formerly, Fairplay) is an unincorporated community in El Dorado County, California, United States. It is located 4.5 miles (7.2 km) northeast of Aukum, at an elevation of 2329 feet (710 m).

Fair Play was a mining town in the 1850s, transitioning to a farming economy by the 1880s. The Fair Play Cemetery remains open and active today.

In more recent years, the Fair Play area has become known for its wineries; the Fair Play AVA was established in 2001 and has become a local travel destination for small accommodations, vineyards and wineries with well over 20 properties.

A post office was operated at Fair Play from 1860 to 1944.

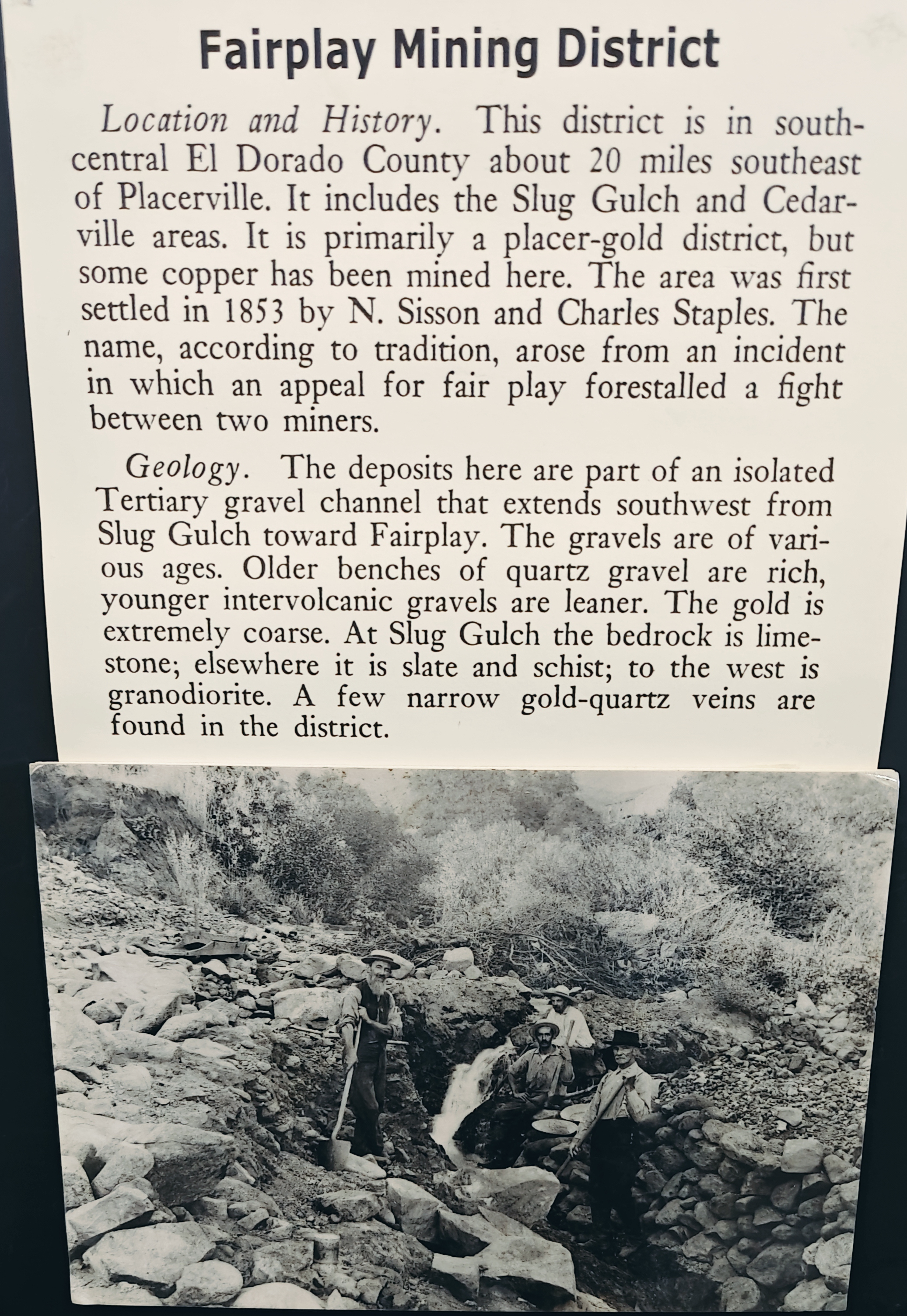
Early history and geological summary of Fair Play
