= William Russell Kelly =

American businessman

- Born: November 21, 1905; Koksilah, British Columbia
- Died: January 3, 1998 (aged 92); Fort Lauderdale, FL
- Education: Vanderbilt University, University of Pittsburgh
- Known for: Kelly Services

William Russell Kelly (November 21, 1905 – January 3, 1998) was the founder of the American temporary staffing agency, Russell Kelly Office Service, later known as Kelly Girl Service, Inc., then Kelly Services, Inc.

== Early life ==
Born in Koksilah, British Columbia, he was the fifth of seven children born to Mary Agnes Bickel Kelly and James Watson Kelly. One obituary states "Upon graduation from Gulfcoast Military Academy in Gulfport, Miss. in 1922, Kelly, then 16, began attending Vanderbilt University and then the University of Pittsburgh.". Yet another states he was an undergraduate at the University of Pennsylvania.
