= Fair Play AVA =

American Viticultural Area in El Dorado County, California

Coordinates: 38°35′48″N 120°39′26″W

Fair Play
- Wine region
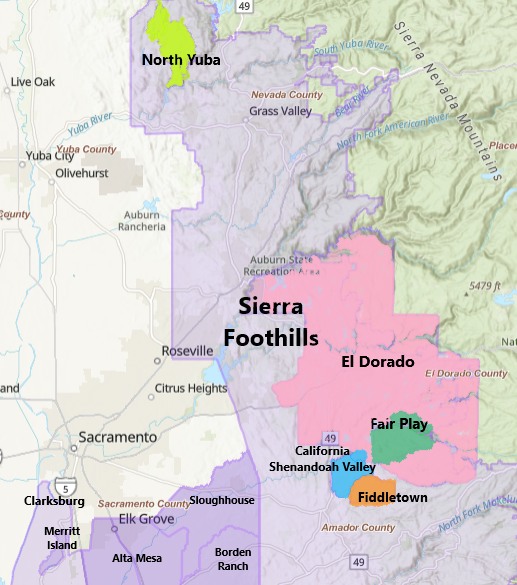
- Type: American Viticultural Area
- Year established: 2001; 2015 Expansion
- Years of wine industry: 139
- Country: United States
- Part of: California, Sierra Foothills AVA, El Dorado AVA
- Other regions in California, Sierra Foothills AVA, El Dorado AVA: California Shenandoah Valley AVA
- Growing season: 230-250 days
- Climate region: Region III
- Heat units: 3,500 GDD units
- Precipitation (annual average): 35 to 40 in (890–1,020 mm)
- Soil conditions: Deep, moderately to well drained, granitic soils of the Holland, Shaver, and Musick series
- Total area: 21,000 acres (33 sq mi)
- Size of planted vineyards: 350 acres (140 ha)
- Grapes produced: Barbera, Black Muscat, Cabernet Franc, Cabernet Sauvignon, Chardonnay, Grenache, Grenache Blanc, Malbec, Merlot, Mourvedre, Petit Verdot, Petite Sirah, Pinot noir, Pinotage, Sangiovese, Sauvignon blanc, Souzao, Syrah, Tempranillo, Tinta Cao, Touriga Nacional, Viognier, Zinfandel
- No. of wineries: 25-30

Fair Play is an American Viticultural Area (AVA) located in El Dorado County, California. It was established as the nation's 139^{th}, the state's 84^{th} and the county's third appellation on February 26, 2001 by the Bureau of Alcohol, Tobacco and Firearms (ATF) after reviewing the petition submitted by Brian Fitzpatrick, President of Fair Play Winery Association, proposing a viticultural area in southern El Dorado County known as "Fair Play."

The viticultural area encompasses 21,000 acres (33 sq mi) encircling the town of Fair Play and located entirely within the existing boundaries of the El Dorado and vast Sierra Foothills AVAs. The topography of Fair Play includes rolling hills at elevations between 2,000 and 3,000 feet (610–910 m) above sea level, making it the second highest average elevation after Squaw Valley-Miramonte viticultural area in the state. The soils are decomposed granite as part of the Sierra Nevada Foothills region, and the area is within the Cosumnes River watershed. In its cultivated 350 acres (140 ha), the most popular red wine grape variety is Zinfandel, although varieties popular in Rhône Valley and Italy, such as Syrah, Grenache, Petite Sirah, Mourvedre, Sangiovese, Tempranillo and Barbera are the common varietals. White wine is less popular in Fair Play, but significant plantings of Viognier and Grenache Blanc, along with Sauvignon Blanc are most common.

== History ==
Fair Play viticultural area takes its name from an old gold mining camp during the California gold rush. Although Fair Play was at first only a mining camp, the town later became a trading center and post office for drift and hydraulic mines in the area. The Alta Californian newspaper dated December 21, 1853, mentions Fair Play as a prosperous little mining town with several stores and hotels. The first commercial vineyard and winery in the viticultural area was established in 1887 by a Civil War veteran, Horace Bigelow. Bigelow planted 4,000 grape vines and by 1898 was producing between 600 and 1,000 US gallons (2,271 and 3,785 L; 500 and 833 imp gal) of wine each year. Today, the Fair Play viticultural area is gaining recognition as a wine growing area and is featured in the media and on some wine labels.

The modern era started in the late 1970s and early 1980s, when Brian Fitzpatrick, Bill Naylor, Les and Lynn Russell, to name a few primary vineyard builders started in earnest. Today these are the vineyards and wineries along Fair Play Road and Perry Creek Road. An early established winery where the original owner is there(in 2026), is Cedarville Vineyard, it established in the 1990s. Many more vineyards ensued in the later 1980s and throughout the 1990s, as the area developed for viticulture.

== Terroir ==
=== Topography ===
The arable terrain within the Fair Play viticultural area is generally composed of rolling hillsides and rounding ridge tops. At these elevations, 2,000 to 3,400 ft (610–1,040 m), each vineyard's topographic location in relationship to the immediate surroundings is of utmost importance to minimize the negative effects of late spring frosts. Most of the existing vineyards are situated on the ridge tops or hillsides so there is lower ground for the cold air to drain. To the east and southeast, the boundaries include terrain too rugged for commercial viticulture. This is also true of Coyote Ridge to the south. Although little vineyard activity is anticipated in these steep canyon lands, the use of the Middle Fork of the Cosumnes River, Cedar Creek, Scott Creek, and South Fork of the Cosumnes River make easily understood and prominent boundaries.
The lowest elevations in the area, about 2,000 ft (610 m), occur along Perry Creek and the North and South Forks of Spanish Creeks where they flow west out of the Fair Play viticultural area. The lowest existing vineyards sit at about 2,000 ft (610 m) near Mt. Aukum. The elevation rises to the north, east and south to a maximum of about 3,400 ft (1,000 m) above Slug Gulch Road and Walker Ridge. To the north, the steep sides of the canyon of the Middle Fork of the Cosumnes River are not suitable for viticulture. The bottom land along the river, ranging from 1,700 to 1,800 ft (520–550 m) elevation, is at least two hundred feet (61 m) lower in elevation than the lowest points included within the boundaries. The rugged terrain east of the boundaries, and the volcanic "caps" to the southeast and south quickly rise above 2,800 ft (850 m). Elevation is significant because of its effect on growing conditions for vines in the Sierra Nevada Foothills. Prevailing westerly winds dominate the AVA, but cool down-slope drainage winds occur diurnally, flowing downhill in the evening and overnight as higher elevations lose heat more quickly. These cooling winds are most pronounced during veraison and ripening, and in some vintages contribute to a slow, dry ripening that helps preserve acidity and extend hang time for the vines. With most vineyards planted between 2,000 ft (610 m) and 3,400 ft (1,000 m) , Fair Play has one of the highest average elevations of any AVA in California. Following the 2015 establishment of the higher Squaw Valley-Miramonte AVA in Fresno County, Fair Play is generally cited as the second-highest.

=== Climate ===
The U.S.D.A. Soil Survey shows that in this part of Sierra Foothills, rainfall generally increases along with the elevation. The isobars generally run from the northwest to southeast, similar to the general run of the elevation contour lines. The Fair Play viticultural area receives between 35 and 40 in (890–1,020 mm) of rain in an average year, while the lower areas to the west and southwest of Fair Play receive 35 in (890 mm) or less. The U.S.D.A. chart for the length of growing season follows the reverse pattern; as elevation increases, the growing season decreases. Fair Play enjoys an average growing season of between about 230 and 250 days; the areas to the west and southwest show over 250 days. Thus, the Fair Play viticultural area enjoys more rainfall, but with a shorter growing season, than the areas to the west and southwest. Based on the standard University of California at Davis (UCD) temperature summation definition of climatic regions or zones, the Fair Play viticultural area would appear to fall into high Region 3 (less than 3,500 degree days). The areas to the west and southwest fall into low Region 4 (over 3,500 degree days). The USDA plant hardiness zone is 9a.

=== Soil ===
The Fair Play viticultural area is characterized by deep, moderately to well drained, granitic soils of the Holland, Shaver, and Musick series. These soils consist of sandy loams and coarse sandy loams, with an effective average rooting depth between 40 and 60 inches (1,000–1,500 mm). The soil maps taken from the USDA Soil Survey show the specific areas where each of these soils predominate; the boundaries were specifically designed to include these three soil series, and to exclude other soils which are either not granitic, or shallow, or poorly drained. The areas to the north and east of the boundaries are predominately shallow granitic soils of the Chawanakee and Chaix series. The northern and eastern boundaries are drawn primarily based on terrain and ease of description, but with the intent to generally exclude these soils. The southeastern and southern boundaries of the Fair Play viticultural area, the waterways of Cedar Creek into Scott Creek into the South Fork of the Cosumnes River, lay out a clear geological demarcation where the granitic soils predominate and the volcanic soils begin. Thus, the Fair Play viticultural area has a soil association that sets it apart from the rest of the Sierra Foothills and El Dorado viticultural areas.

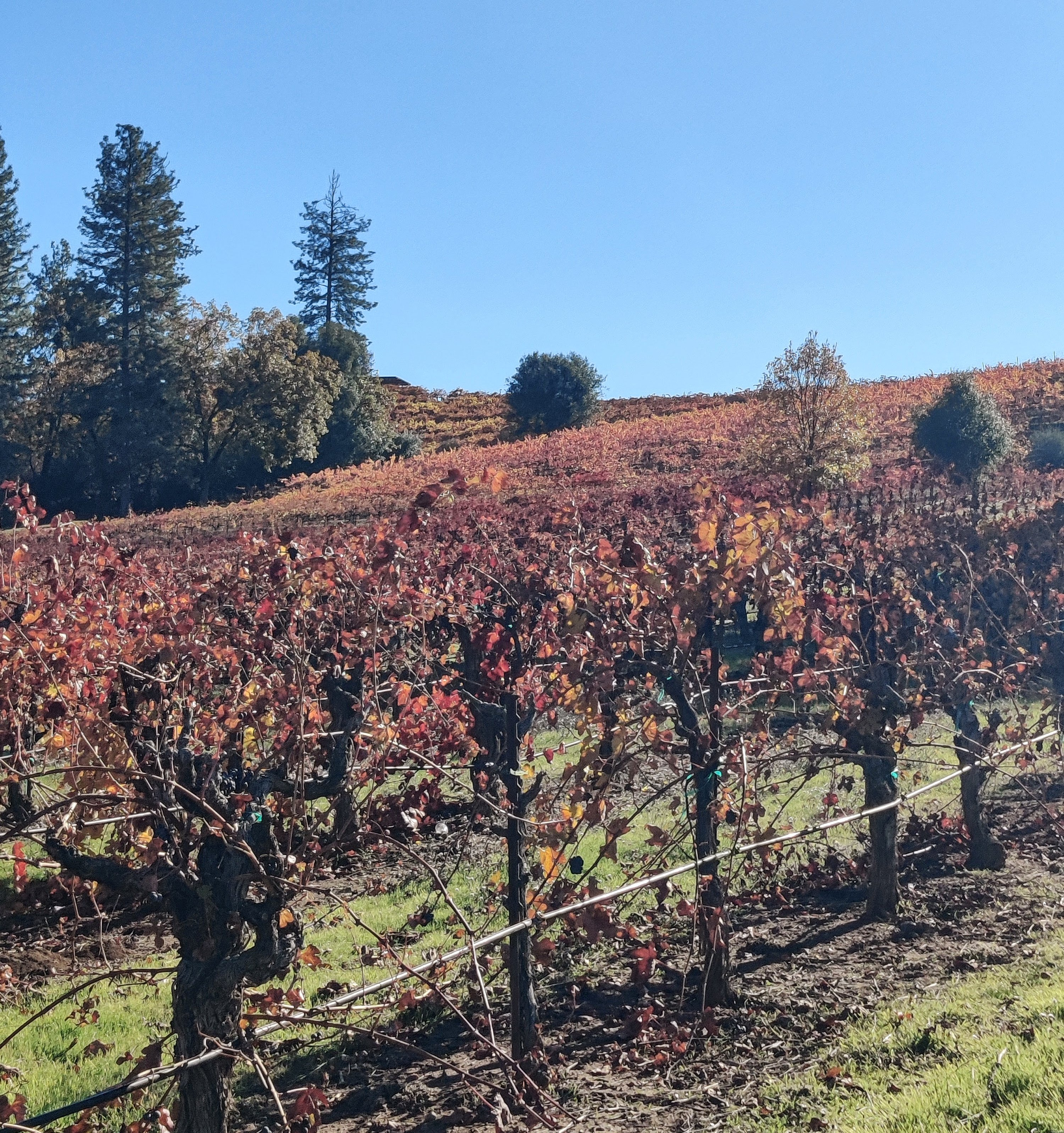
Fair Play vineyard

== Wineries ==
The Fair Play Winery Association shows 21 active member wineries with a more extensive list below.

- Bumgarner
- Busby Vineyard & Winery
- Cantiga Wineworks
- Cedar Creek Ranch & Vineyards
- Cedarville Vineyard
- Charles B. Mitchell Vineyards
- Château d' Estienne
- E16 Winery
- Element 79 Vineyards
- Gold Mountain Winery & Lodge
- Golden Leaves Vineyard & Winery
- Gwinllan Estate
- Iverson Winery
- Mastroserio Winery
- Medeiros Family Vineyards and Winery
- Mediterranean Vineyards
- Mellowood Vineyards
- MV Winery - Miller Vineyards
- Oakstone Winery
- Sentivo Vineyards & Winery
- Shadow Ranch Vineyard
- Skinner Vineyards & Winery
- Toogood Estate Winery
- Vista del Mirador Winery
- Windwalker Vineyards
