= Coloma, California =

- census-designated place
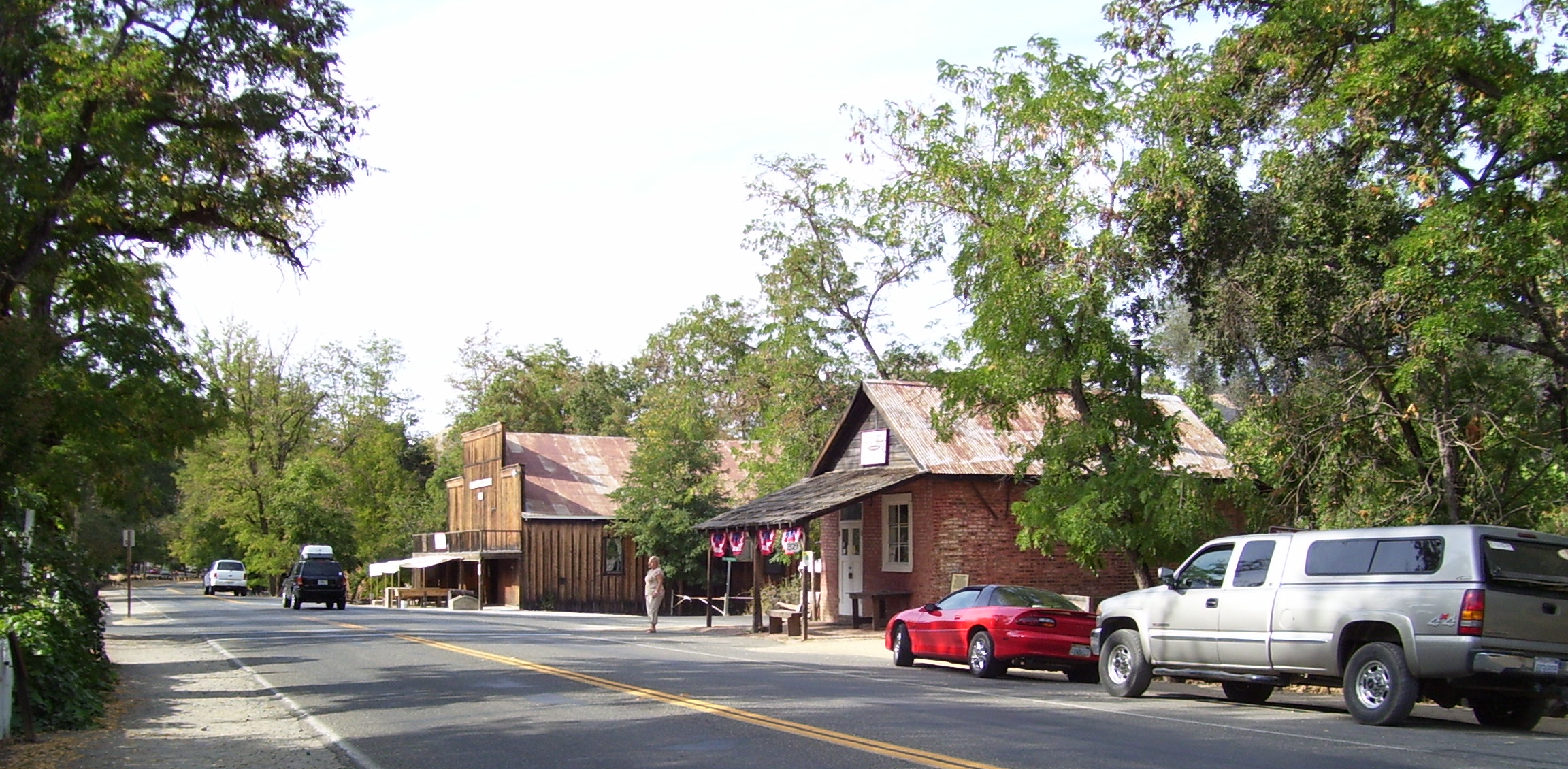
- Coloma, 2008

- Location of Coloma in El Dorado County, California

- Position in California
- Coordinates: 38°48′10″N 120°53′40″W
- Country: United States
- State: California
- County: El Dorado

Area
  - Total: 3.36 sq mi (8.69 km^{2})
  - Land: 3.36 sq mi (8.69 km^{2})
  - Water: 0 sq mi (0.00 km^{2}) 0%
- Elevation: 764 ft (233 m)

Population (2020)
  - Total: 521
  - Density: 155/sq mi (60.0/km^{2})
- Time zone: UTC-8 (Pacific (PST))
  - Summer (DST): UTC-7 (PDT)
- Area codes: 530, 837
- GNIS feature ID: 1655915; 2582981
- Coloma
- U.S. National Register of Historic Places
- U.S. National Historic Landmark District
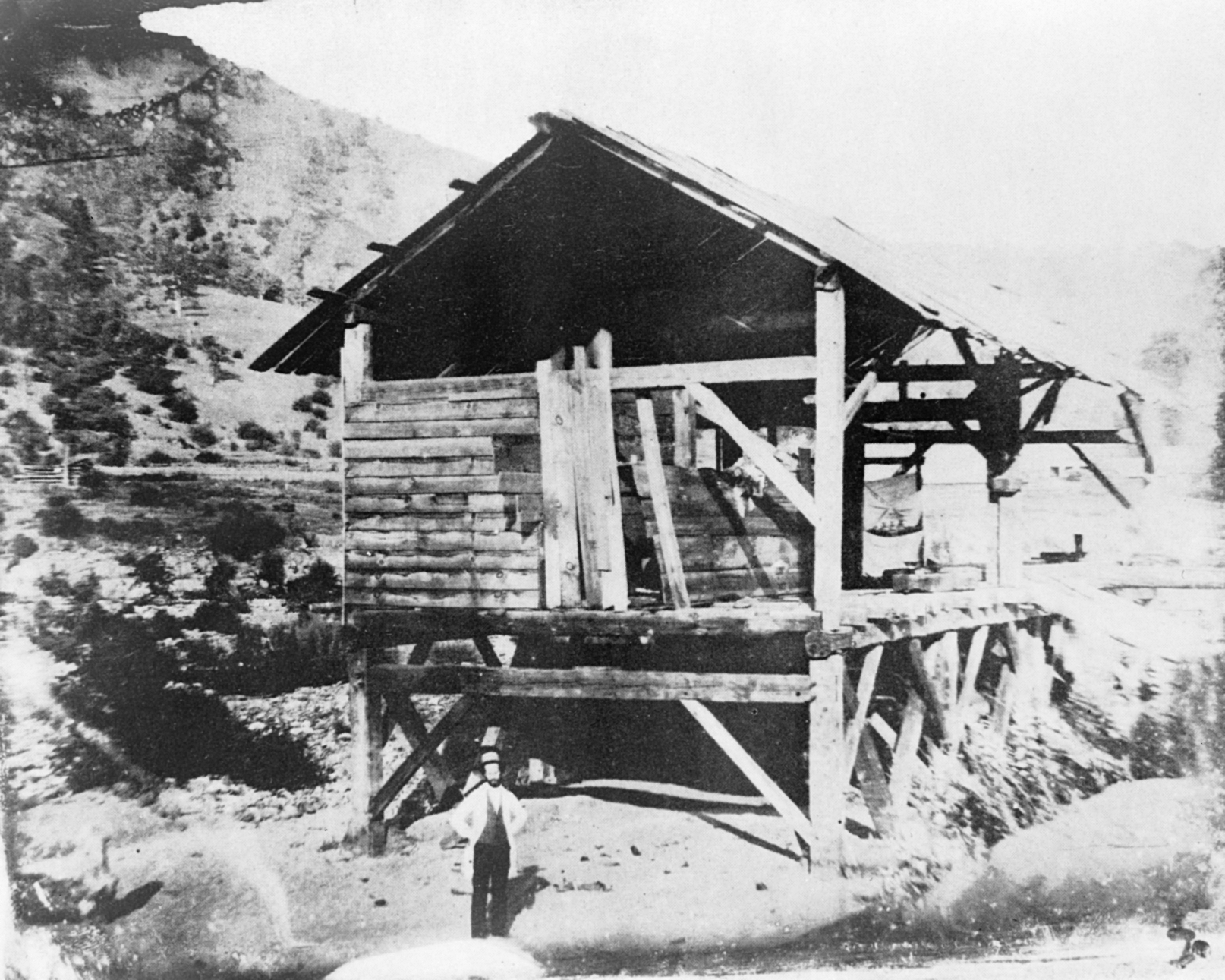
- Sutter's Mill 1850
- Nearest city: Placerville, California
- Area: c. 250 acres (100 ha)
- Built: 1848
- NRHP reference No.: 66000207

Significant dates
- Added to NRHP: October 15, 1966
- Designated NHLD: July 4, 1961

Coloma (Nisenan: Cullumah, meaning "beautiful") is a census-designated place (CDP) in El Dorado County, California, United States. It is approximately 36 miles (58 km) northeast of Sacramento. Coloma is most noted for being the site where James W. Marshall found gold in the Sierra Nevada foothills, at Sutter's Mill on January 24, 1848, leading to the California gold rush. As of the 2020 census, Coloma had a population of 521.

The settlement is a tourist attraction known for its ghost town and the centerpiece of the Marshall Gold Discovery State Historic Park. Coloma was designated a National Historic Landmark District on July 4, 1961.

Coloma lies at an elevation of 764 feet (233 m).

== Etymology ==
The name comes from the Nisenan Native Americans name for the valley in which Coloma is located: Cullumah, meaning 'beautiful.' Coloma is on the South Fork American River that runs through the valley and was built on the original Indian village of Koloma. Former spellings include "Colluma" and "Culloma".

== History ==
Coloma grew around Sutter's Mill following the finding of gold. A post office was established in 1849 under the name Culloma, changing to Coloma in 1851.

One of Coloma's earliest settlers was Silas Sanderson (1824–1886), who went on to become the 7th Chief Justice of California. Another was Nancy Gooch, who was one of the first black women to succeed in California.

== Ghost town ==
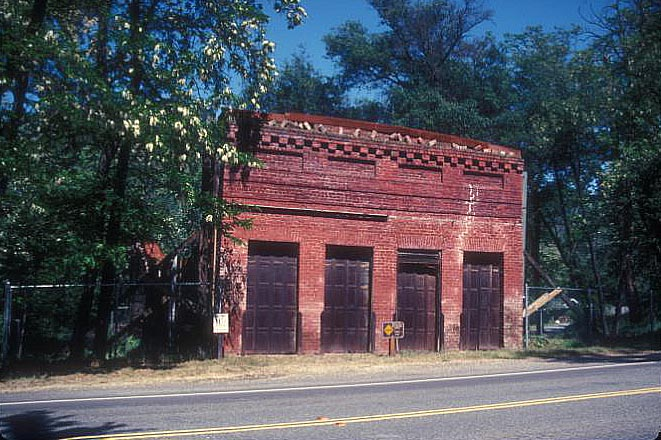
Robert Bell's store in Coloma

While some people still live in the area, Coloma is considered something of a ghost town because civic buildings such as the jail have been abandoned and left to decay, and other buildings from its boom era (1847–1852) have been converted into museums and other historical displays. The tailrace of Sutter's Mill remains, as does a nearby reconstruction.

In reality the meaningfulness of the township of Coloma has dissipated as residents who live in the wider Coloma Valley area generally share a community spirit.

The local economy is based predominantly on agriculture and tourism. Of particular note is the rafting industry as the South Fork American River is one of the most popular white-water trips in North America.

== Demographics ==
Historical population
Census	Pop.	Note	%±
2010	529		—
2020	521		−1.5%
U.S. Decennial Census; 2010

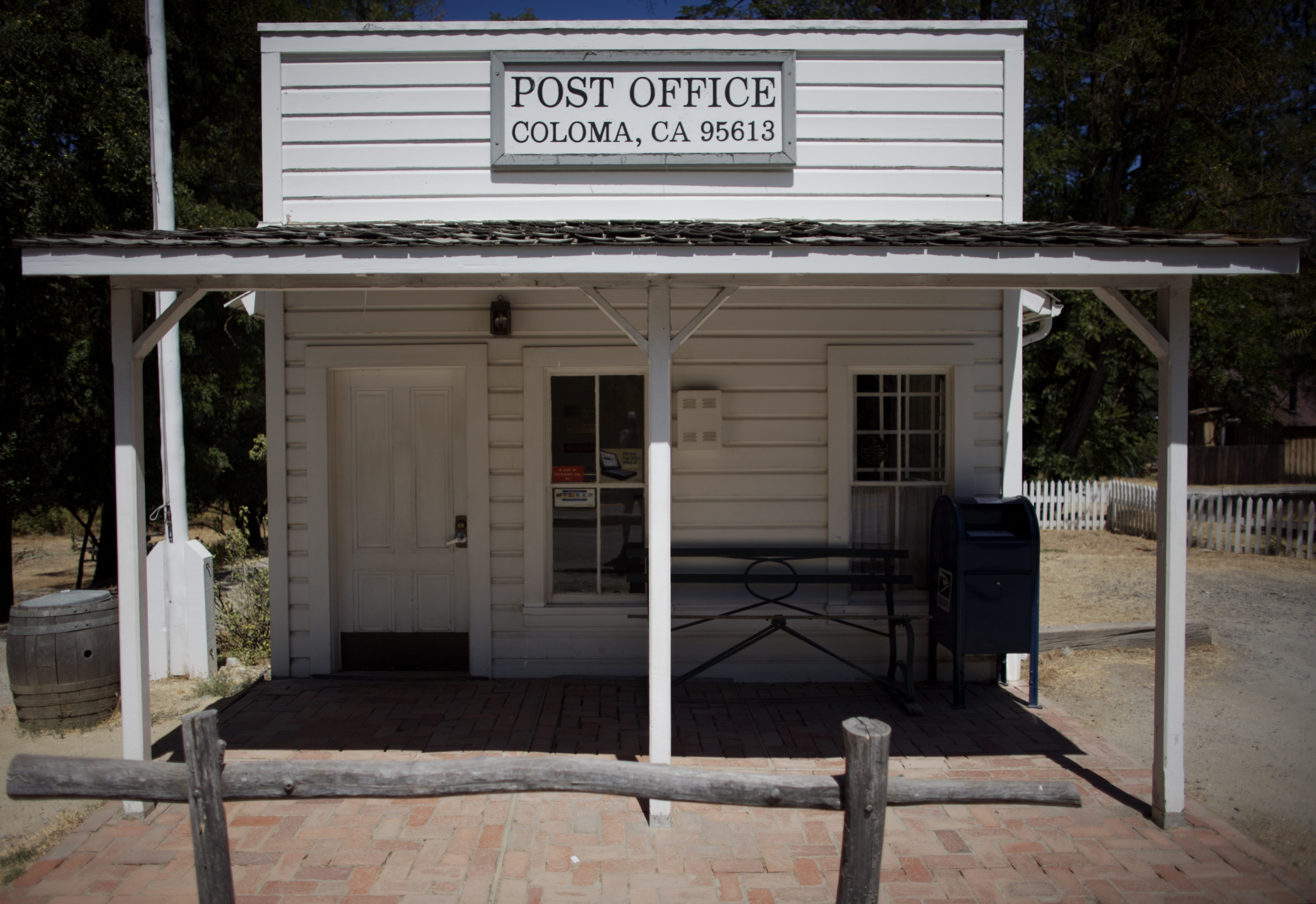
Post Office

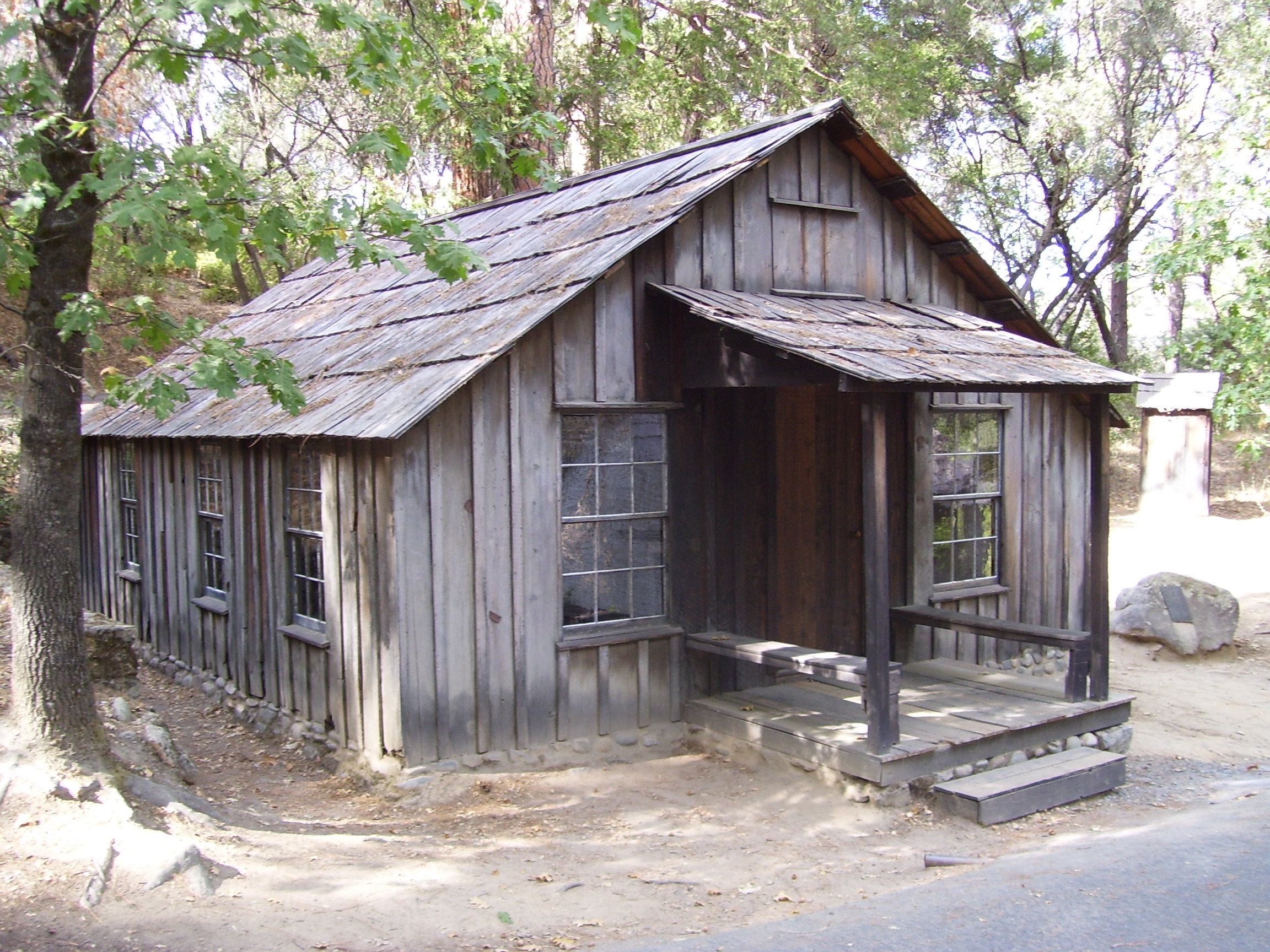
James Marshall cabin in Coloma

=== 2020 census ===
As of the 2020 census, Coloma had a population of 521. The population density was 155.3 inhabitants per square mile (60.0/km^{2}). The median age was 55.9 years. The age distribution was 62 people (11.9%) under the age of 18, 40 people (7.7%) aged 18 to 24, 98 people (18.8%) aged 25 to 44, 167 people (32.1%) aged 45 to 64, and 154 people (29.6%) who were 65 years of age or older. For every 100 females, there were 101.9 males, and for every 100 females age 18 and over there were 109.6 males age 18 and over. All residents (100.0%) lived in rural areas.

504 people (96.7% of the population) lived in households, 17 (3.3%) lived in non-institutionalized group quarters, and no one was institutionalized.

There were 222 households, of which 79 (35.6%) had children under the age of 18 living in them. Of all households, 133 (59.9%) were married-couple households, 15 (6.8%) were cohabiting couple households, 47 (21.2%) had a female householder with no spouse or partner present, and 27 (12.2%) had a male householder with no spouse or partner present. 28 households (12.6%) were made up of individuals, and 16 (7.2%) had someone living alone who was 65 years of age or older. The average household size was 2.27. There were 169 families (76.1% of all households).

There were 267 housing units at an average density of 79.6 units per square mile (30.7 units/km^{2}), of which 222 (83.1%) were occupied. Of these, 170 (76.6%) were owner-occupied, and 52 (23.4%) were occupied by renters. The homeowner vacancy rate was 2.9% and the rental vacancy rate was 8.5%.

Racial composition as of the 2020 census
Race	Number	Percent
White	417	80.0%
Black or African American	5	1.0%
American Indian and Alaska Native	3	0.6%
Asian	6	1.2%
Native Hawaiian and Other Pacific Islander	0	0.0%
Some other race	22	4.2%
Two or more races	68	13.1%
Hispanic or Latino (of any race)	60	11.5%

=== 2010 census ===
Coloma first appeared as a census designated place in the 2010 U.S. census.

== Politics ==
In the state legislature, Coloma is in the 4th senatorial district, represented by Republican Marie Alvarado-Gil, and the 5th Assembly district, represented by Republican Joe Patterson.

Federally, Coloma is in California's 5th congressional district, represented by Republican Tom McClintock.

== Climate ==
According to the Köppen Climate Classification system, Coloma has a warm-summer Mediterranean climate, abbreviated "Csa" on climate maps.

== Sister cities ==
Coloma is sister cities with Clunes, Australia.

== Education ==
Coloma lacks any traditional public schools within its census-designated boundaries. Local students attend schools in nearby districts outside the community, including Sutters Mill Elementary School and Gold Trail School, both operated by the Gold Trail Union Elementary School District. Because Coloma lies within the GTUSD's boundaries, and because the district only operates two K-8 campuses, Coloma students are assigned to Sutters Mill for elementary grades and Gold Trail for middle school.

High school students attend Golden Sierra High School in Garden Valley, California, which is part of the Black Oak Mine Unified School District. Similar to its K-8 situation, Coloma falls within BOMUSD's high school service area, making Golden Sierra the designated comprehensive high school for residents in Coloma.

== Notable people ==
- Nancy Gooch
