= Oregon House, California =

Unincorporated community in California, United States

Oregon House
- Unincorporated community
- Location in California Oregon House (the United States)
- Coordinates: 39°21′23″N 121°16′45″W
- Country: United States
- State: California
- County: Yuba
- Elevation: 1,526 ft (465 m)
- ZIP code: 95962
- Area code: 530

Oregon House is an unincorporated community in Yuba County, California, United States. It is located 22 miles (35 km) northeast of Marysville, at an elevation of 1526 feet (465 m).

The settlement grew up around a travelers' rest stop built in 1852. A post office was established at Oregon House in 1854, closed in 1902, and reopened in 1903.

New Bullards Bar Dam, one of the tallest dams in the United States, is approximately six miles away.
