= Buckeye Flat, California =

Human settlement in El Dorado County, California, United States of America

Coordinates: 38°40′10″N 120°54′47″W

Buckeye Flat is a former mining town in El Dorado County, California, United States, located one mile east of Shingle Springs at an elevation of about 1,400 ft (400 m).

The town was named after its first settlers, who came from the state of Ohio, known as the Buckeye State. At its peak, from 1852 to 1856, Buckeye Flat had several stores and at least two hotels. It was home to the first school in the surrounding district.
