= Brad Waldow =

American basketball player

Free agent
- Position: Power forward

Personal information
- Born: December 30, 1991 (age 34) Houston, Texas
- Listed height: 6 ft 10 in (2.08 m)
- Listed weight: 250 lb (113 kg)

Career information
- High school: Ponderosa (Shingle Springs, California)
- College: St. Mary's (2010–2015)
- NBA draft: 2015: undrafted
- Playing career: 2015–present

Career history
- 2015–2016: Antwerp Giants
- 2016–2017: Fos Provence Basket
- 2017–2018: Turów Zgorzelec
- 2018: Caen Basket Calvados
- 2018–2020: Nishinomiya Storks
- 2020: Toyotsu Fighting Eagles Nagoya
- 2021: Toyoda Gosei Scorpions
- 2021–2022: Racing Luxembourg
- 2022–2023: Peja
- 2023–2024: Bashkimi

Career highlights
- Kosovo Superleague champion (2023)

Brad Ernest Waldow (born December 30, 1991) is an American basketball player who last played for the Bashkimi of the Kosovo Superleague. He competed in college for the St. Mary's Gaels.

== Early life ==
Waldow began playing competitive basketball in eighth grade. In his sophomore season at Ponderosa High School, he slimmed down and had a growth spurt that saw him increase his height from 6'2 to 6'7. Waldow averaged 26 points and 11 rebounds per game as a senior. Despite this, he was lightly recruited and one of the few collegiate offers came from St. Mary's.

== College career ==
Waldow redshirted his freshman year at St. Mary's, which he used to add muscle to his frame. In an overtime win against San Diego on March 10, 2013, Waldow contributed 23 points, 16 rebounds, and four blocked shots and had a tooth knocked out while fighting for a rebound. He then tried to hand the tooth to coach Randy Bennett. After the incident, Waldow used a vampire mouthguard and had reconstructive dental surgery.

Due to better conditioning, Waldow put up 15 points and 7.5 rebounds per game as a junior and improved his post game. Waldow was a First-Team All-West Coast Conference and NABC All-District selection as a junior and senior. He set a career high with 29 points in a game against Boise State on December 6, 2014. As a senior, Waldow posted 19.0 points and 9.1 rebounds per game. He was one of two players in the country to average in excess of 19 points and nine rebounds per game alongside Iona's David Laury. He finished his St. Mary's career ranked second in games played with 134 and fourth in points (1,743), rebounds (900) and blocks (133). Waldow participated in the Reese's Division I College All-Star Game on April 3, 2015, and had 12 points and six rebounds.

== Professional career ==
Prior to the 2015 NBA draft, Waldow worked out with a number of NBA teams including the Milwaukee Bucks. In August 2015, Waldow signed with the Antwerp Giants of the Belgian league. He was inside the Brussels airport at the time of the terror attacks of March 22, 2016. Waldow was scheduled to board a flight to Italy to play in the FIBA Europe Cup, but did not get on the plane due to the attacks. According to Waldow, he was inside the food court with a teammate when he heard screams and ran downstairs to meet with the rest of the team.

He later played with Fos Provence Basket of the French Liga B and averaged 11.1 points and 6 rebounds per game. In September 2017, Waldow inked with the Turów Zgorzelec of the Polish Basketball League. He posted 13.3 points and 7.6 rebounds per game in Poland. On August 1, 2018, Waldow signed with Caen Basket Calvados of the French second division. On November 16, Waldow parted way with the team and announced tohe was heading to Japan, and signed with Nishinomiya Storks of the Japanese second division on December 6, 2018. During the 2019–20 season, he averaged 21.1 points, 10.4 rebounds, and 2.7 assists per game. On June 30, 2020, Waldow signed with Toyotsu Fighting Eagles Nagoya.
