= Sam Clemons =

American football player (born 1978)

No. 6
- Position: Quarterback

Personal information
- Born: October 10, 1978 (age 48); Sacramento, California, U.S.
- Listed height: 6 ft 2 in (1.88 m)
- Listed weight: 210 lb (95 kg)

Career information
- High school: Oak Ridge (El Dorado Hills, California)
- College: Western Illinois
- NFL draft: 2002: undrafted

Career history
- Dallas Cowboys (2002)*; Chicago Rush (2004); Dallas Desperados (2005)*; Quad City Steamwheelers (2005); Georgia Force (2006); New York Dragons (2006)
- * Offseason or practice squad member only

Career AFL statistics
- Comp. / Att.: 13 / 20
- Passing yards: 193
- TD–INT: 2–2
- QB rating: 81.88
- Stats at ArenaFan.com

Samuel Clemons (born October 10, 1978) is an American former professional football quarterback who played one season in the Arena Football League (AFL) with the Georgia Force and New York Dragons. He first enrolled at University of California, Berkeley before transferring to Western Illinois University. Clemons was also a member of the Dallas Cowboys, Chicago Rush, Dallas Desperados, Quad City Steamwheelers, and Kane County Eagles.

== Early life ==
Clemons played high school football at Oak Ridge High School in El Dorado Hills, California. He completed 36 of 209 passes for 2,141 yards and 28 touchdowns with two interceptions his senior year. He earned Sierra Valley Conference Offensive Player of the Year honors in 1996. and earned first-team All-Metro honors. Clemons also lettered in basketball and baseball.

== College career ==
Clemons enrolled at the University of California, Berkeley to play college football for the Golden Bears. He redshirted the 1997 season. He started the first two games of the 1999 season before being replaced by Kyle Boller. Clemons played in ten games overall for the California Golden Bears from 1998 to 1999, completing 12 of 32 passes (37.5%) for 110 yards and two interceptions.

Clemons transferred to play for the Western Illinois Leathernecks from 2000 to 2001. Clemons was the Gateway Football Conference leader in total offense in 2001.

== Professional career ==
Clemons spent the 2002 off-season with the Dallas Cowboys of the National Football League. He was released by the Cowboys in August 2002. He signed with the AFL's Chicago Rush on November 20, 2003. Clemons was released by the Rush on January 19, 2005. On January 27, 2005, he was signed to the practice squad of the Dallas Desperados of the AFL. He was released by the Desperados April 4, 2005. Clemons played for the Quad City Steamwheelers of the af2 in 2005. He signed with the Georgia Force of the AFL on October 21, 2005. He was waived by the Force on March 6, 2006. Clemons was signed by the AFL's New York Dragons on March 15, 2006.

== Personal life ==
Clemons was Adam Sandler's double during drop backs and passing scenes in The Longest Yard.
