= Murder of Joanne Witt =

2009 murder in California, US

- Date: June 11, 2009
- Location: El Dorado Hills, California; 38°41′09″N 121°04′56″W
- Type: Murder
- Cause: Stabbing
- Motive: Revenge
- Target: Joanne Witt
- Arrests: June 16, 2009
- Suspects: Tylar Witt, Steven "Boston" Colver
- Convicted: June 15, 2011
- Charges: Second degree murder (Witt), first degree murder (Colver)
- Trial: May 17, 2011 – June 15, 2011
- Verdict: Guilty
- Sentence: 15 years to life (Witt); life without parole (Colver)

On the night of June 11, 2009, Joanne Witt was murdered by her teenage daughter Tylar and Tylar's boyfriend Steven "Boston" Colver, one or both of whom stabbed Witt 20 times on the upper half of her body. Witt was murdered because she had objected to their relationship as Tylar was only 14, while Colver was 19. When Witt missed two days of work without calling, her supervisor called both law enforcement and Witt's parents. Sheriff's deputies met the parents at Witt's home in El Dorado Hills, California, where they discovered the body. Tylar and Colver were arrested in San Bruno, California, several days later. Two years after the murder, Tylar pled guilty to second degree murder and was sentenced to 15 years to life in prison. Colver was tried and convicted of first degree murder and was sentenced to life without the possibility of parole. On August 26, 2022, Tylar Witt was granted parole and was released in 2023.

== Background ==
Forty-seven-year-old single mother Joanne Witt lived with her daughter Tylar Marie in El Dorado Hills, California, and worked as an engineer for El Dorado County. Though Joanne's parents would later insist she had been a devoted mother, Joanne and her daughter had a contentious relationship. When Tylar was five years old, Joanne lost custody for six months after hitting her. As Tylar grew older, relations continued to grow more strained and occasionally combative.

In December 2008, during her first year of high school, 14-year-old Tylar began spending time at a local coffee shop, where she met 19-year-old Steven Paul Colver, who went by the nickname "Boston". The two became close friends and, according to Tylar, began dating on February 23, 2009. Weeks later, they became sexually active. When Colver began looking for a place of his own, Tylar suggested he rent the extra bedroom in her mother’s house. Joanne was unsure at first, given Colver’s being male and five years older than Tylar. Tylar assured her mother that Colver was gay and their relationship was more like that of a brother and sister. Against the advice of her family, Joanne allowed Colver to move into the room.

While living there, Colver and Tylar began using marijuana, MDMA, and cocaine. One month after Colver moved in, Joanne returned home and entered Colver’s room to find her daughter crouched inside the closet, naked, and covering herself with a pillow. Joanne realized she had interrupted the two having sex and ordered Colver out of her house. She called her friend Vinnie Catapano to assist in ejecting Colver. Catapano moved Colver's belongings to the sidewalk and warned him against further contact with the Witt family, threatening an "East Coast style" reprisal should he disobey. Joanne considered filing charges against Colver for statutory rape, but agreed not to when Tylar promised to end the relationship.

Some time later, Joanne discovered Tylar and Colver had continued their relationship without her knowledge, seeing each other while she was at work or asleep. According to Tylar's grandfather, Norb Witt, Colver secretly entered the Witt home approximately 20 times to see her. At the same time, Joanne found Tylar's journal containing intimate details of the couple's sexual encounters. Joanne contacted law enforcement to file statutory rape charges and turned over the journal as evidence. When questioned by detectives, Colver reaffirmed the fraternal nature of the relationship, denying any sexual activity. After meeting with law enforcement, Joanne took Tylar to dinner at Joanie's Cafe and Grill in Shingle Springs and informed her that she had proceeded with filing charges against Colver. According to their server, Tylar showed no reaction to the news, even when Joanne said, "You know, he's in real trouble."

== Murder ==
At trial, Tylar testified that when she found out her mother had turned over her journal, she felt certain Colver would be convicted. In discussing what to do, Tylar and Colver formed a suicide pact. Inspired by the story of Romeo and Juliet, they decided to run away to San Francisco and kill themselves. In order to keep Joanne from pursuing them, they decided to drug and kill her as well before leaving.

On the night of June 11, 2009, Tylar poured her mother a drink and added a large amount of sleeping medication. Once Joanne fell asleep, Tylar let Colver into the home. A few hours later, they visited the home of their friend, Matthew Widman, and told him they had just come from killing Joanne. Colver showed Widman a white shopping bag containing a butcher knife covered with blood. Colver claimed he had used the knife to stab Joanne Witt in the throat and stomach. Tylar and Colver said their goodbyes to Widman before leaving for San Francisco.

On Friday, June 12, 2009, Joanne’s supervisor noted her absence from work and tried repeatedly to contact her. When she failed to call or show again the following Monday, he called the El Dorado County Sheriff’s Department and subsequently called her parents, Norb and Judy Witt, to inquire as to Joanne's whereabouts. The elder Witts drove to Joanne's home and found law enforcement already on the scene. Norb unlocked the door to admit them and sheriff's deputies entered the home to find Joanne dead in her bed, with 20 stab wounds on her face, neck, and arms. The air conditioning in the home had been turned down, apparently to slow decomposition of the body.

== Arrest and interrogation ==
Suspicion quickly focused on Tylar and Colver. On June 16, 2009, they were discovered at The Shops at Tanforan in San Bruno, California, and taken into custody. Officers found them changing their clothes behind a dumpster. Their hotel room in San Francisco held what CBS News called "a bizarre mixture of Froot Loops, cake, and rat poison," which the couple had apparently eaten in an attempt to fulfill their mutual suicide pact. Additionally, police found condoms, marijuana, a suicide note, and a DVD of the film Donnie Darko.

During Tylar's interrogation, she claimed to have no knowledge of her mother's death. When police reminded her that she was under arrest for murder, Tylar insisted her mother was not dead and claimed her right to legal counsel. Colver asked about Tylar, claiming to be worried about her.

== Trial ==
Tylar Witt accepted a deal before the case went to trial. In return for a guilty plea and her testimony against Colver, her charges would be reduced from first degree murder to second degree murder, in turn reducing her prison term from 25 years to life to 15 years to life.

At trial, they admitted to having planned the crime together, but each accused the other of performing the murder. During opening statements, delivered on May 17, 2011, prosecutor Lisette Suder claimed Colver to be solely guilty of the murder, while Colver's attorney Dain Weiner said Colver had merely claimed guilt in order to protect Tylar. During her testimony, Tylar indicated that they had entered Joanne's bedroom, knives in hand; however, she could not bring herself to do it. Instead, she stood outside her mother's bedroom door while Colver stabbed Joanne. Tylar said that, despite having plugged her ears with her fingers, she could hear her mother begging Colver to stop. Colver then came out of the bedroom with his pants soaked in blood and crying a single tear. According to Tylar, they then hugged and she reassured him. In support of Tylar's story, small amounts of male DNA were found under Joanne's fingernails and on her body, in what were apparently defensive wounds. Suder said, "It is very likely that the DNA comes from Joanne trying to fight her attacker," which she considered evidence of Colver's guilt, as he was the only male involved in the case.

Weiner attacked Tylar's mental stability, asserting that the crime was motivated by her hatred of her mother. Tylar responded by claiming that she suffered from Dissociative Identity Disorder, having what she termed "three souls crowded in one body": herself, an angel named Alex, and a demon called Toby, who took control of her during times of stress.

When Colver took the stand, he testified that Tylar had initially lied about her age, claiming to be 16, but Joanne later confirmed Tylar's true age. He claimed that he had initially felt unsure about pursuing a romantic relationship. He confirmed Tylar's story about multiple personalities, having seen the demon take control at one point following a fight between Tylar and her mother. Colver indicated that on the night of the murder, Joanne was already dead when he arrived at the house and saw Tylar holding the knife in her right hand, her pants stained with blood. According to Colver, she then told him, "Boston, I did it. I finally did it. My mom is gone forever." The defense brought in Bob Blasier, part of the defense team in the O.J. Simpson trial, in an attempt to refute the DNA evidence. Blasier testified that there was an insufficient quantity of DNA to form the conclusion that it belonged to Colver.

After less than four hours of deliberation, on June 15, 2011, the jury found Colver guilty of the murder and special circumstances of lying in wait, use of a deadly weapon, and killing a witness. Two months later, on August 12, 2011, Judge Daniel B. Proud sentenced Colver to life in prison without the possibility of parole and upheld Tylar's agreed-upon sentence of 15 years to life. Members of the Witt family delivered victim impact statements before the sentence was handed down.

Tylar Witt was incarcerated in Central California Women's Facility in Chowchilla and was granted parole on August 26, 2022.

Colver is incarcerated at California Health Care Facility in Stockton, California.
