= Michael Cox (serial killer) =

American serial killer

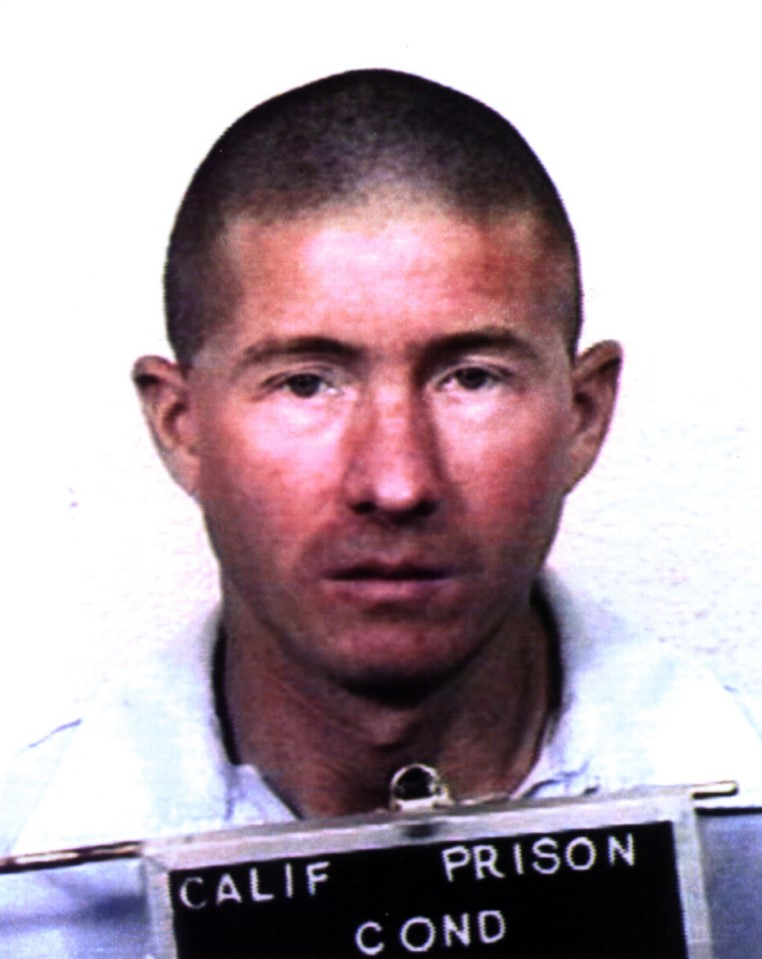
- Born: Michael Anthony Cox; May 17, 1956 (age 70); Monterey County, California, U.S.
- Other name: The Forest Killer
- Conviction: First degree murder with special circumstances (3 counts)
- Penalty: Death

Details
- Victims: 3
- Span of crimes: June – August 1984
- Country: United States
- State: California
- Date apprehended: November 10, 1984

Michael Anthony Cox (born May 17, 1956) is an American serial killer who was convicted of murdering three teenage girls in Placerville, California, and hiding their bodies in the Eldorado National Forest in 1984. Dubbed The Forest Killer by the media, he was sentenced to death the following year and is currently awaiting execution.

== Early life ==
Cox was born in 1956 in Monterey County, California, the oldest child in a family of seven kids. His biological father split with his mother, Jean Stokes, during her pregnancy, and she later married a man named Forest Jayne. Jayne is suspected to have molested Cox during his adolescence, and in 1969 he drugged and molested a boy in their neighborhood, causing the family to move out of Monterey County to avoid potential prosecution. Later, during a snowstorm, Jayne accidentally drove the family car off a cliff. Cox rescued his mother and one of his little brothers. While she was being treated at a hospital for broken ribs, Cox took care of his siblings. He attended El Dorado High School, where he worked as a student aid in the library. Cox also suffered from epilepsy and an alcohol addiction.

== Murders ==
After high school, Cox worked with a youth forestry conservation crew, where he became acquainted with several adolescents, among them were sisters Debbie and Denise Galston, both 14, who lived in a foster home in Placerville. Cox was known to have regularly insulted Denise with derogatory language, often calling her a slut and a hoser. On June 12, 1984, Denise was hanging out with her friends at a nearby Bell Tower, an area that was often used by teenagers as a hangout spot. Cox was driving in his car nearby and approached 17-year-old Joanna Napoletano, who lived with the Galstons at their foster home. He offered to drive her to a party at a nearby park, and she agreed, but when they got there, he made an unwanted sexual move toward Napoletano, grabbing her breast and causing her to flee. She returned downtown, where she pulled Galston aside and spoke with her about the incident with Cox.

Afterwards, Galston began walking home when she was approached by Cox in his car, again inviting her in to go to a party. She agreed, and Cox again approached Napoletano, who reluctantly got in. Afterwards, Cox drove to an underpass and forced both girls out while brandishing a knife. He proceeded to attack Galston and stab her in the throat. During this, Napoletano ran away and flagged down a nearby car. Despite what had happened, she refused to tell anyone what Cox had done. After killing Galston, Cox dumped her body in Pollock Pines of the Eldorado National Forest.

On June 29, 1984, Cox visited a club in downtown Placerville, where he met a 17-year-old girl named Lynda Burrill. After convincing her to follow him to the parking lot, he kidnapped her and drove her to a secluded location, where he subsequently stabbed her to death. On August 8, Cox kidnapped Debbie Galston, Denise's twin sister, while she was walking to a nearby party. He killed her under similar circumstances and dumped her body near an oil rig.

== Investigation ==
On July 31, the partial remains of Denise Galston were found by a logging crew, and just five days later, the remains of Burrill were found. The discovery of the bodies caused a stir among city residents, with investigators concluding a single killer was responsible. By early September, the body of Debbie Galtson had yet to be found, but some of her clothes had been recovered along a highway. Her skeletal remains were eventually found in late October and identified through dental records.

On August 12, Cox was sleeping in his car when it was approached by a Placer field police officer. The officer discovered a gun protruding from under the driver's seat and determined it to be a fully loaded .357-caliber Smith and Wesson revolver. Handcuffs were also located in the rear floorboard area, and a knife and scabbard were found in the trunk. Afterwards, Cox was interviewed twice as a possible suspect in the murders but denied involvement. After Joanna Napoletano came forward with her information, Cox was arrested on November 10.

== Trial and imprisonment ==
Cox was indicted on three murder charges on November 14 and pleaded not guilty in January 1985. His trial in July resulted in a guilty verdict. During the penalty phase, Cox's lawyers attempted to persuade the jury to not impose a death sentence because of his troubled childhood. The jury nevertheless returned a verdict of death on August 7, and he entered San Quentin State Prison later that month.

== See also ==
- List of serial killers in the United States
