= 2016 FEU Tamaraws basketball team =

American college basketball season

2016 FEU Tamaraws men's basketball
- Conference: UAAP
- Record: 10–6 (9–5 Elimination Round)
- Head coach: Nash Racela (4th season)
- Assistant coach: Eric Gonzales, Ryan Betia, Gilbert Lao, and Johnny Abarrientos
- Captain: Raymar Jose

The 2016 FEU Tamaraws Men's Basketball Team represented Far Eastern University during the University Athletic Association of the Philippines' 79th season in men's basketball division. The Tamaraws were led by their fourth year coach Nash Racela.

The Tamaraws were looking to defend their crown this season, facing a great challenge with core players like Mac Belo, Mike Tolomia and Russel Escoto having left the team due to graduation, Half of the team were newcomers.

== Departures ==
Name	Number	Pos.	Height	Weight	Year	Hometown	Notes
Al Francis Tamsi	5	SG	6'0"	-	Senior	Tagbilaran, Bohol	Graduated
Russel Escoto	8	C	6'6"	-	Senior	Angeles City	Playing for Gilas Pilipinas
Steve Holmqvist	11	SF	6'4"	-	Sophomore	Oslo, Norway	Injured
Rey Mark Belo	12	PF	6'4"	-	Senior	Midsayap, Cotabato	Playing for Gilas Pilipinas
Mike Tolomia	13	SG	5'11"	-	Senior	-	Playing for Gilas Pilipinas
Roger Ray Pogoy	16	SF	6'2"	-	Senior	Cebu	Playing for Gilas Pilipinas
Achie Iñigo	18	PG	5'9"	-	Senior	Las Piñas	Graduated

== Roster ==
FEU Tamaraws roster
Players
Coaches

Pos.	No.	Nat.	Name	Height	Year	High School
PG	4	(United States)	Trinidad, Jose Allen C.	5'9" (1.75m)	2nd	Orange Coast
PG	5	(Philippines)	Iñigo, Alejandrino Antonio S.	5'7" (1.7m)	3rd-transfer	San Beda
PF	6	(Philippines)	Jose, Raymar A. (C)	6'4" (1.93m)	5th	Cebu Eastern College
SG	7	(Philippines)	Dennison, Ron Marvis C.	5'9" (1.75m)	4th	UV
PF	8	(Philippines)	Ebona, Kevin Barkley C.	6'4" (1.93m)	2nd	Cebu-IT
SF	9	(Philippines)	Bayquin, Kim Lee	6'3" (1.91m)	2nd-transfer	Chiang Kai Shek
PG	10	(Philippines)	Comboy III, Wendelino T.	6'0" (1.83m)	2nd	FEU Diliman
PG	11	(Philippines)	Denila, Augus Vince	6'0" (1.83m)	2nd	Ateneo de Iloilo
SG	12	(Philippines)	Arong, Monbert D.	5'11" (1.8m)	5th-Transfer	USP
SG	13	(Philippines)	Nunag, Joseph Gerald L.	6'1" (1.85m)	1st	Rangitoto HS
PF	15	(Philippines)	Bienes, Brandrey G.	6'5" (1.96m)	1st	FEU Diliman
SF	16	(United States)	Roxas, Ser Stephen Kaye	6'2" (1.88m)	1st	Freedom
C	17	(Nigeria)	Orizu, Prince I.	6'8" (2.03m)	2nd	Ikeja High School
C	18	(Norway)	Holmqvist, Ken S.	6'8" (2.03m)	2nd	El Dorado
PF	20	(New Zealand)	Tuffin, Kenneth James D.	6'4" (1.93m)	1st	St Patrick's College
SF	21	(Philippines)	Escoto, Richard D.	6'3" (1.91m)	3rd	FEU Diliman

Head coach

- (Philippines) Nash Racela

Assistant coach(es)

- (Philippines) Josh Reyes
- (Philippines) Johnny Abarrientos
- (Philippines) Jojo Lastimosa
- (Philippines) Eric Gonzales
- (Philippines) Gilbert Lao

Team manager

- (Philippines) Mark Molina
- (Philippines) Anton Montinola

Legend

- (C) Team captain
- Injured

- Roster
- Transactions
Updated: 2016–09–04

== Team depth chart ==
Rotation

Pos.	Starting 5	Bench 1	Bench 2	Bench 3
C	Prince Orizu	Ken Holmqvist	Kevin Barkley Ebona
PF	Raymar Jose	Richard Escoto	Brandrey Bienes
SF	Kenneth Tuffin	Ron Dennison	Kim Lee Bayquin
SG	Monbert Arong	Wendel Comboy	Joseph Nunag	Stephen Roxas
PG	Jojo Trinidad	Axel Inigo	Augus Denila

== Schedule ==
Date time, TV	Rank^{#}	Opponent^{#}	Result	Record	High points	High rebounds	High assists	Site (attendance) city, state
UAAP Season 79 First Round
September 7*; 4:00 pm		La Salle	L 78–83	0–1	13 – Dennison	10 – Orizu	5 – Comboy	Mall of Asia Arena; Pasay, Philippines
September 11*; 2:00 pm		Adamson	W 75–65	1–1	13 – Inigo	12 – Jose	4 – Inigo	Smart Araneta Coliseum; Quezon City, Philippines
September 14*; 4:00 pm		Ateneo	L 71–76	1–2	20 – Comboy	16 – Orizu	3 – Bayquin & Nunag	Mall of Asia Arena; Pasay, Philippines
September 18*; 4:00 pm		UE	W 67–59	2–2	16 – Arong	22 – Jose	4 – Arong	Smart Araneta Coliseum; Quezon City, Philippines
September 25*; 2:00 pm		State U	W 51–49	3–2	14 – Arong	15 – Orizu	2 – Dennison & Inigo	Smart Araneta Coliseum; Quezon City, Philippines
October 1*; 4:00 pm		UST	W 79–72	4–2	17 – Trinidad	13 – Orizu	5 – Jose	Mall of Asia Arena; Pasay, Philippines
October 5*; 4:00 pm		National	W 78–75	5–2	20 – Arong	9 – Orizu	5 – Dennison	Mall of Asia Arena; Pasay, Philippines
UAAP Season 79 Second Round
October 9*; 2:00 pm		National	W 57–56	6–2	14 – Jose	12 – Jose	4 – Trinidad	Mall of Asia Arena; Pasay, Philippines
October 12*; 4:00 pm		UST	W 59–48	7–2	16 – Trinidad	14 – Jose	5 – Comboy	Mall of Asia Arena; Pasay, Philippines
October 22*; 2:00 pm		State U	W 63–60	8–2	20 – Jose	12 – Jose	2 – Tied	Smart Araneta Coliseum; Quezon City, Philippines
November 6*; 12:00 pm		Adamson	L 59–61	8–3	16 – Jose	12 – Orizu	3 – Trinidad & Comboy	Filoil Flying V Centre; San Juan, Metro Manila
November 9*; 2:00 pm		Ateneo	L 59–74	8–4	15 – Arong	16 – Orizu	5 – Arong	Mall of Asia Arena; Pasay, Philippines
November 12*; 4:00 pm		La Salle	L 67–73	8–5	18 – Iñigo	11 – Orizu	3 – Arong & Dennison	Mall of Asia Arena; Pasay, Philippines
November 16*; 2:00 pm		UE	W 64–61	9–5	16 – Iñigo	12 – Jose	4 – Iñigo & Comboy	Mall of Asia Arena; Pasay, Philippines
UAAP Season 79 Final Four
November 26; 4:00 pm		Ateneo	W 62–61	1–0	20 – Jose	23 – Jose	3 – Iñigo	Mall of Asia Arena; Pasay, Philippines
November 30; 4:00 pm		Ateneo	L 68–69	1–1	15 – Arong	12 – Jose & Orizu	6 – Comboy	Smart Araneta Coliseum; Quezon City, Philippines
*Non-conference game. ^{#}Rankings from AP Poll. (#) Tournament seedings in parentheses. All times are in Philippine Time.

== Statistics ==
Updated: October 5, 2016

Player	GP	MPG	PPG	RPG	APG	SPG	BPG	TPG
Raymar Jose	7	28.86	10.14	10.71	1.71	0.86	0.00	3.57
Monbert Arong	7	19.71	11.29	3.14	1.86	0.29	0.00	2.00
Wendelino Comboy III	6	18.00	8.83	3.33	2.50	0.50	0.33	1.83
Richard Escoto	4	17.25	8.00	2.75	0.25	0.50	0.25	2.25
Prince Orizu	7	23.86	6.86	11.00	0.00	0.43	1.86	2.43
Axel Iñigo	6	20.50	7.33	3.17	2.17	0.67	0.00	1.17
Joe Allen Trinidad	7	18.00	6.86	2.86	1.86	0.00	0.00	1.71
Ron Dennison	6	21.17	4.83	3.83	2.33	1.00	0.00	1.33
Kimlee Bayquin	7	13.14	3.43	1.14	1.14	0.57	0.00	1.86
Ken Holmqvist	7	6.86	3.14	1.71	0.29	0.00	0.00	0.73
Joseph Nunag	6	8.67	2.67	1.17	1.17	0.00	0.00	0.67
Kenneth Tuffin	7	9.57	1.86	1.14	0.14	0.00	0.00	0.29
Brandrey Bienes	4	5.75	1.00	1.00	0.25	0.00	0.00	0.75
Kevin Barkley Eboña	7	5.57	1.29	1.00	0.57	0.14	0.29	0.57
Augus Denila	3	4.33	1.33	0.00	0.00	0.33	0.00	0.00
Stephen Roxas	2	5.50	1.50	0.50	0.00	0.00	0.00	0.50

Source: PBA-Online.net
