= James Campen =

American football player and coach (born 1964)

Pittsburgh Steelers
- Title: Offensive line coach

Personal information
- Born: June 11, 1964 (age 62); Sacramento, California, U.S.
- Listed height: 6 ft 3 in (1.91 m)
- Listed weight: 260 lb (118 kg)

Career information
- High school: Ponderosa (Shingle Springs, California)
- College: Sacramento City College (1982–1983); Tulane (1984–1985)
- NFL draft: 1986: undrafted

Career history

Playing
- New Orleans Saints (1986–1988); Green Bay Packers (1989–1993)

Coaching
- Green Bay Packers (2004–2018); Assistant offensive line coach & quality control coach (2004–2005); Assistant offensive line coach (2006); Offensive line coach (2007–2017); Offensive line coach & run game coordinator (2018); Cleveland Browns (2019) Associate head coach & offensive line coach; Los Angeles Chargers (2020) Offensive line coach; Houston Texans (2021) Offensive line coach; Carolina Panthers (2022–2023) Offensive line coach; Pittsburgh Steelers (2026–present) Offensive line coach

Awards and highlights
- Super Bowl champion (XLV)

Career NFL statistics
- Games played: 67
- Games started: 50
- Fumble recoveries: 3
- Stats at Pro Football Reference

James Frederick Campen (born June 11, 1964) is an American professional football coach and former player who currently serves as the offensive line coach for the Pittsburgh Steelers of the National Football League (NFL). He played as a center for the New Orleans Saints and Green Bay Packers.

== Career ==
Campen spent 11 seasons as the offensive line coach for the Packers who had seven Pro Bowl linemen during his tenure there. Campen left the Packers in 2019 to become associate head coach/offensive line coach with the Cleveland Browns, then coached offensive line for the Los Angeles Chargers in 2020. On March 10, 2021, Campen was hired as offensive line coach for the Houston Texans.

On February 12, 2026, the Pittsburgh Steelers hired Campen to serve as the team's offensive line coach under new head coach Mike McCarthy.

== Personal life ==
Campen graduated in 1982 from Ponderosa High School in Shingle Springs, California. At Ponderosa he made all metro and all-league his junior and senior years of school. He was also voted "all-decade" for the 1980's as an individual player. During a break from professional football Campen returned to Shingle Springs, California and coached for 10 years between 1994 and 2004 with five years as head coach. He also opened a hardware store in Shingle Springs, California. Now he lives with his family in Suamico, Wisconsin.
