= Latrobe School District =

School district in California

Location
- Shingle Springs postal address, California United States

District information
- Type: Public school district
- Grades: K to 8
- Established: 1864
- Superintendent: David Scroggins
- NCES District ID: 0621180

Students and staff
- Enrollment: 148
- Teachers: 9.0 (FTE)
- Staff: 7.39 (FTE)
- Student–teacher ratio: 16.44:1

Other information
- Website: www.latrobesd.org

Latrobe School District is a school district located in El Dorado County, California, US. The district has a Shingle Springs post office address, while none of the Shingle Springs census-designated place is in the district boundaries. The district covers portions of El Dorado Hills CDP. The district educates about 200 students in Kindergarten to eighth grade in two schools.

== Schools ==
Latrobe Elementary School was founded in 1864 by large landowner James Miller. The elementary school is located in Shingle Springs, California approximately 0.5 miles (0.8 kilometers) east north east of Miller's Hill Middle School and 8.15 miles (13.12 kilometers) north east of Ponderosa High School. The school has grades kindergarten through third and a mid-sized cafeteria.

Miller's Hill Middle School is a middle school that enrolls students 4th through 8th grades. The on-campus buildings include: five classrooms, one maintenance shed, administrative office, library, computer lab, gym, cafeteria, and science room.

== Gallery ==
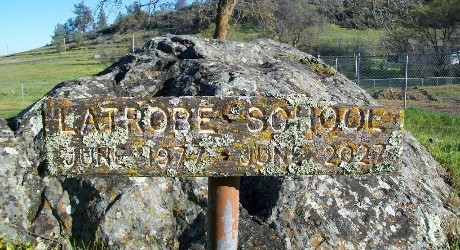
Historical sign at Latrobe Elementary

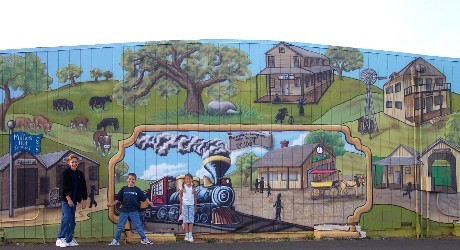
Miller's Hill Mural
