= El Dorado Hills, California =

El Dorado Hills
- Census-designated place
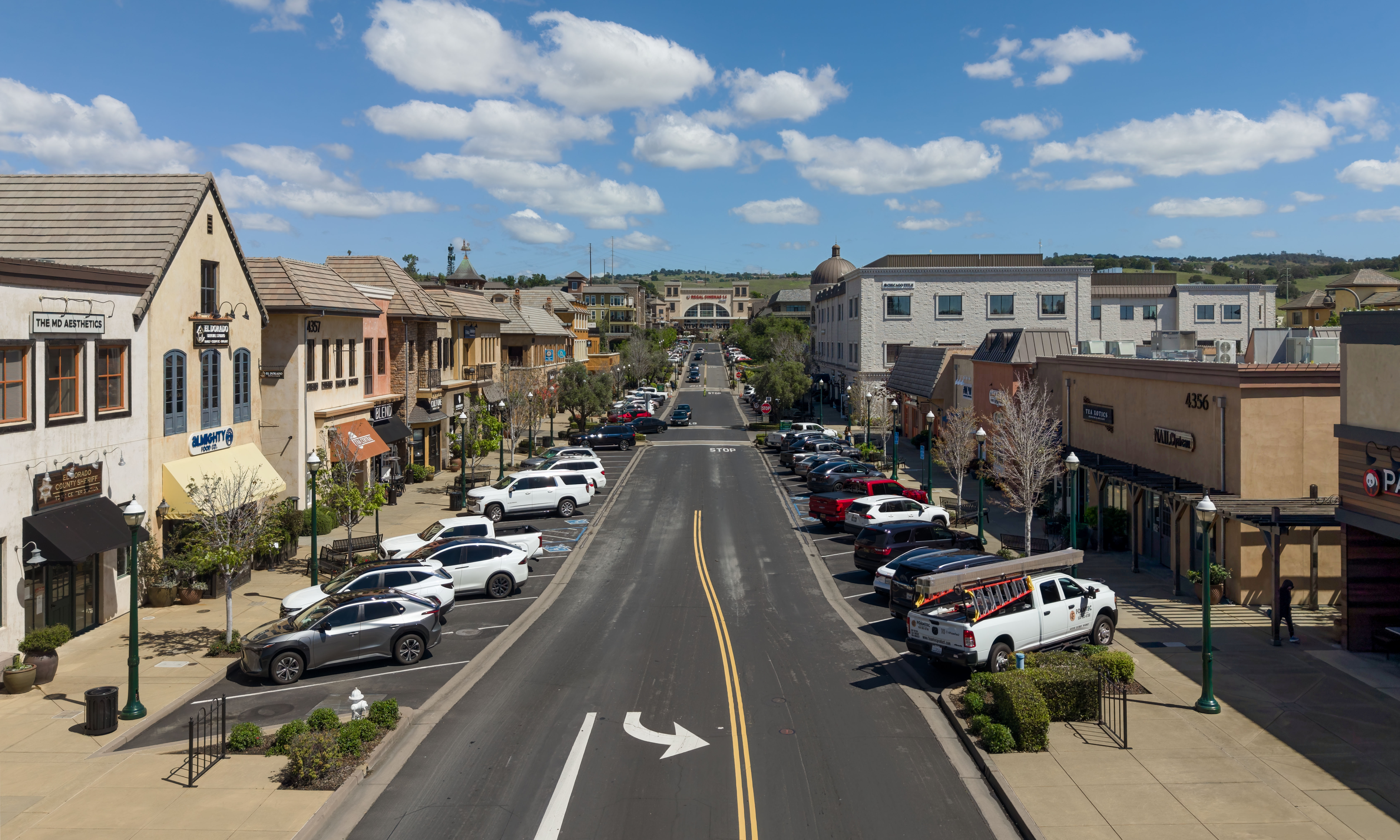
- El Dorado Hills town center
- Interactive map of El Dorado Hills
- Location in the United States
- Coordinates: 38°41′09″N 121°04′56″W
- Country: United States
- State: California
- County: El Dorado

Area
  - Total: 50.865 sq mi (131.740 km^{2})
  - Land: 48.460 sq mi (125.511 km^{2})
  - Water: 2.405 sq mi (6.229 km^{2}) 4.73%
- Elevation: 768 ft (234 m)

Population (April 1, 2020)
  - Total: 50,547
  - Density: 1,043.1/sq mi (402.73/km^{2})
- Time zone: UTC-8 (Pacific)
  - Summer (DST): UTC-7 (PDT)
- ZIP code: 95762
- Area codes: 916, 279, 530, 837
- FIPS code: 06-21880
- GNIS feature IDs: 1867020, 2408055

El Dorado Hills (El Dorado, Spanish for "the Golden") is an unincorporated town and census-designated place in El Dorado County, California, United States. Located in the Greater Sacramento region of Northern California, it had a population of 50,547 at the 2020 census, up from 42,108 at the 2010 census.

== History ==
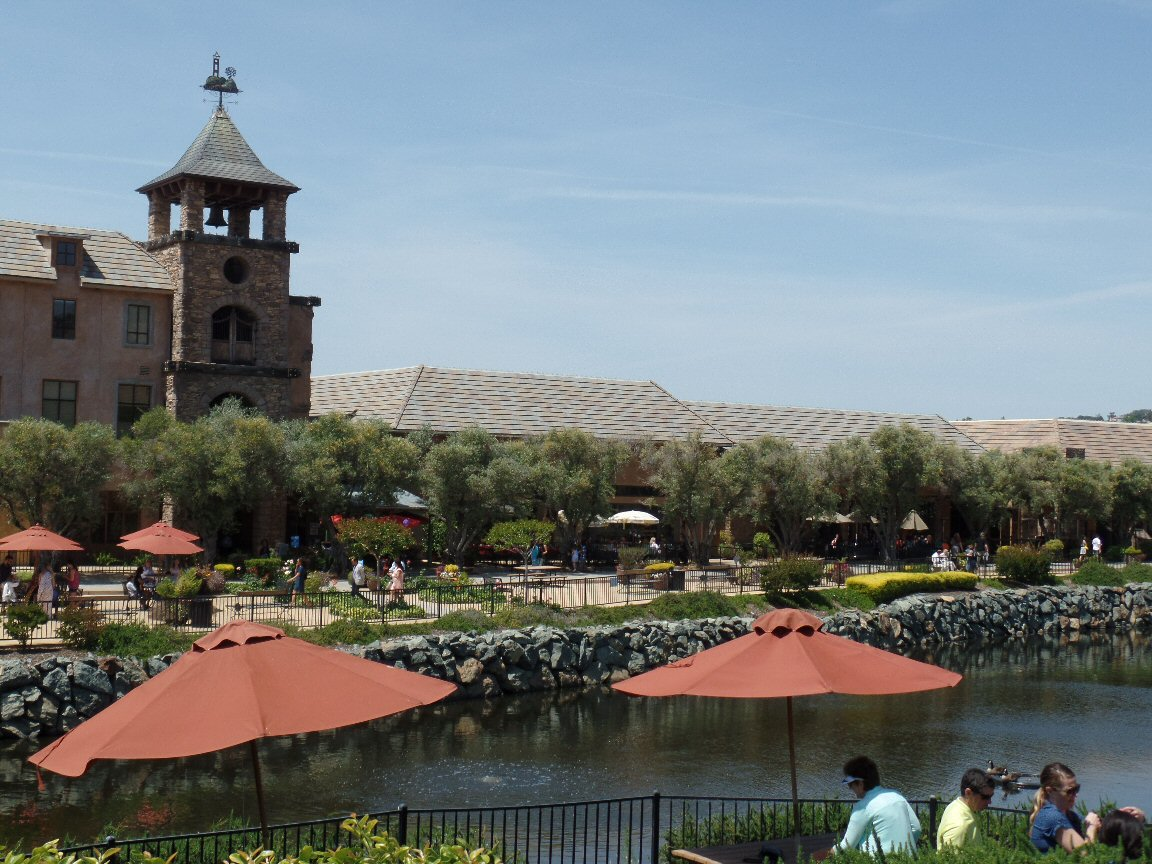
Restaurants in the town center

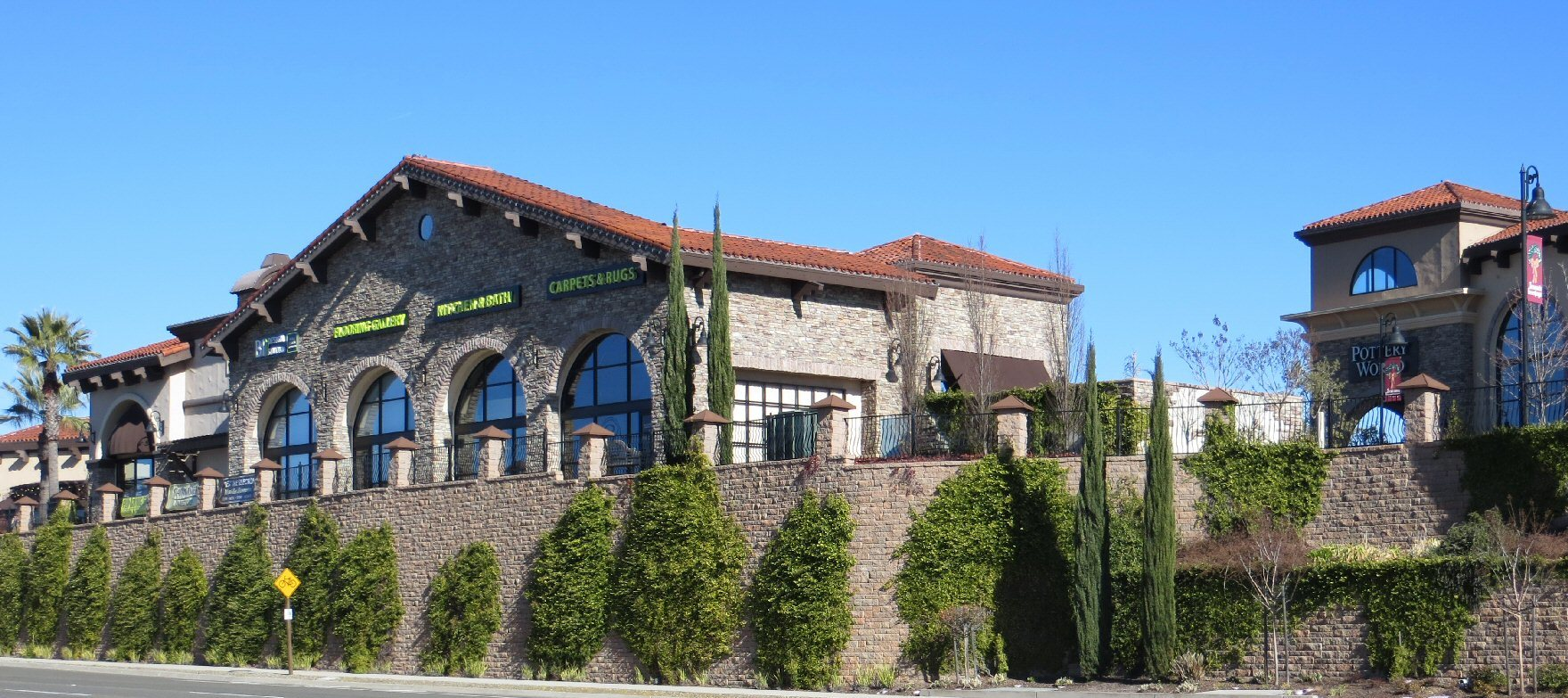
Shops on Latrobe Road

During the California Gold Rush, gold was washed down the South Fork of the American River, into areas that became El Dorado Hills and Folsom, but farming and ranching supplanted mining or panning for gold. Portions of two Pony Express routes in this area from 1860 to 1861 remain as modern El Dorado Hills roads.

The modern history of El Dorado Hills dates to the early 1960s when original developer Allan Lindsey began a master-planned community. The master plan, prepared by architect Victor Gruen, covered the area generally north of U.S. Highway 50, and part of the area south of US 50, later considered to be part of the community. El Dorado Hills was envisioned as a large-scale master-planned community that would be a group of residential "villages" from its inception. Other land uses in the master plan included a business park, 18-hole golf course, community parks, schools, a community shopping center, and small commercial centers in each village. The plan emphasized open space between villages and the opportunity for outdoor recreation.

Between the late 1960s and mid-1990s, growth occurred at a moderate pace as new families relocated from Sacramento, Southern California and the Bay Area. This growth consisted primarily of residential housing, as retail developments were limited to two shopping centers on the corners Green Valley & Francisco and El Dorado Hills Boulevard & US 50. Each neighborhood created during this time period was given a name and referred to as a "village" by local inhabitants. The original villages of El Dorado Hills include Ridgeview, Park, Saint Andrews, Crown, and Governors. In the 1980s and 1990s, the major part of Lake Hills Estates north of Green Valley Road was reorganized into Lake Forest Village, containing the neighborhoods of Waterford, The Summit, Green Valley Hills, Winterhaven, Marina Woods and Windsor Point. Additional villages that have developed subsequently include Fairchild, Sterlingshire, Highland Hills, Highland View, Bridlewood, Hills of El Dorado, Woodridge, Laurel Oaks and the master-planned community of Serrano.

The El Dorado Hills Town Center, just south of US 50, is a mixed-use project developed by The Mansour Company. Occupying 100 acres (40 ha) of land and, at completion, one million square feet (93,000 m^{2}) of buildings, it is the center of town and of the region.

== Geography ==
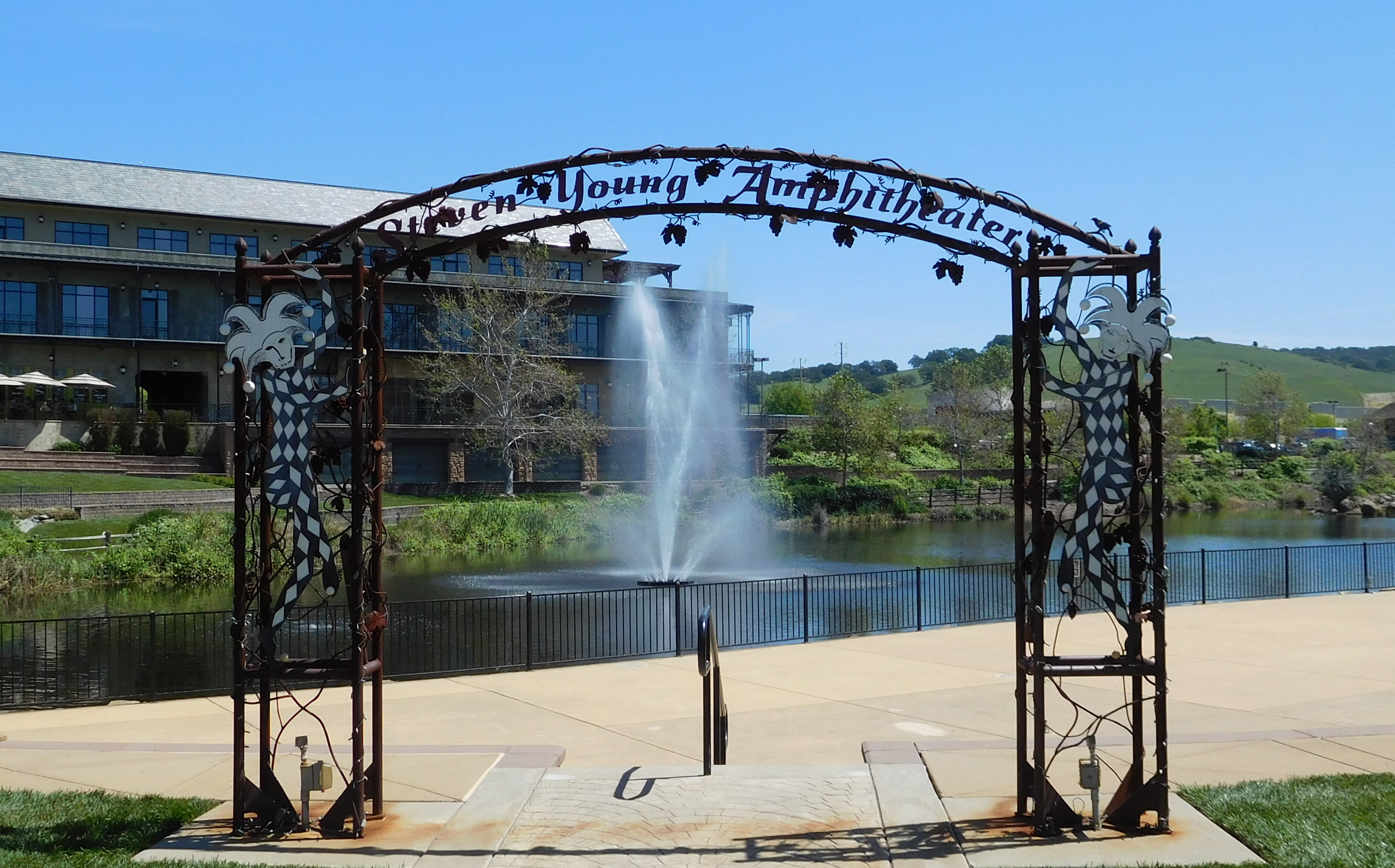
Steven Young Amphitheatre

El Dorado Hills (EDH), as defined by the 2020 census-designated place (CDP), is at the western border of El Dorado County, between the City of Folsom and the unincorporated community of Cameron Park. The northern limits of the CDP are Folsom Lake and the South Fork of the American River, where river rafters use Skunk Hollow and Salmon Falls as takeout landings. West of Latrobe Road, the south edge of the CDP follows railroad tracks formerly used by the Southern Pacific between the cities of Folsom and Placerville. East of Latrobe Road the south edge follows topography running roughly east–west.

The 2020 CDP has a land area of 48.460 square miles (125.51 km^{2}), more than double the size of its boundaries in 2000 CDP, which was 17.9 square miles (46 km^{2}).

The subsurface environment of El Dorado Hills is relatively free of groundwater and soil contamination, based upon an areawide analysis of the potential for pesticide contamination and evaluation of underground storage tanks.(Earth Metrics, 1989)

=== Climate ===
According to the Köppen climate classification, El Dorado Hills has a hot-summer Mediterranean climate (abbreviated Csa).

Climate data for El Dorado Hills, 1991–2020 simulated normals (682 ft elevation)
Month	Jan	Feb	Mar	Apr	May	Jun	Jul	Aug	Sep	Oct	Nov	Dec	Year
Mean daily maximum °F (°C)	55.6 (13.1)	59.9 (15.5)	64.4 (18.0)	70.0 (21.1)	78.4 (25.8)	87.4 (30.8)	94.1 (34.5)	93.4 (34.1)	88.3 (31.3)	77.9 (25.5)	64.4 (18.0)	55.8 (13.2)	74.1 (23.4)
Daily mean °F (°C)	47.3 (8.5)	50.4 (10.2)	54.0 (12.2)	57.7 (14.3)	64.6 (18.1)	71.8 (22.1)	77.4 (25.2)	76.6 (24.8)	72.7 (22.6)	64.2 (17.9)	53.8 (12.1)	47.1 (8.4)	61.5 (16.4)
Mean daily minimum °F (°C)	39.0 (3.9)	40.8 (4.9)	43.3 (6.3)	45.7 (7.6)	50.7 (10.4)	56.1 (13.4)	60.6 (15.9)	60.1 (15.6)	57.0 (13.9)	50.5 (10.3)	43.2 (6.2)	38.3 (3.5)	48.8 (9.3)
Average precipitation inches (mm)	4.71 (119.62)	4.86 (123.38)	4.15 (105.35)	2.35 (59.68)	1.40 (35.56)	0.36 (9.14)	0.00 (0.00)	0.04 (0.98)	0.15 (3.88)	1.14 (28.88)	2.58 (65.46)	4.79 (121.69)	26.53 (673.62)
Average dew point °F (°C)	40.5 (4.7)	41.4 (5.2)	43.3 (6.3)	44.4 (6.9)	47.7 (8.7)	50.4 (10.2)	52.0 (11.1)	50.9 (10.5)	48.0 (8.9)	44.2 (6.8)	42.6 (5.9)	39.7 (4.3)	45.4 (7.5)
Source: PRISM Climate Group

== Demographics ==
Historical population
Census	Pop.	Note	%±
1980	3,453		—
1990	6,395		85.2%
2000	18,016		181.7%
2010	42,108		133.7%
2020	50,547		20.0%
U.S. Decennial Census; 1850–1870 1880-1890; 1900 1910 1920; 1930 1940 1950; 1960 1970 1980; 1990 2000 2010

El Dorado Hills first appeared as a census designated place in the 1980 U.S. census.

=== Racial and ethnic composition ===
El Dorado Hills CDP, California – Racial and ethnic composition Note: the US Census treats Hispanic/Latino as an ethnic category. This table excludes Latinos from the racial categories and assigns them to a separate category. Hispanics/Latinos may be of any race.
Race / Ethnicity (NH = Non-Hispanic)	Pop 2000	Pop 2010	Pop 2020	% 2000	% 2010	% 2020
White alone (NH)	15,665	32,481	34,609	86.95%	77.14%	68.47%
Black or African American alone (NH)	137	593	677	0.76%	1.41%	1.34%
Native American or Alaska Native alone (NH)	63	145	109	0.35%	0.34%	0.22%
Asian alone (NH)	723	3,492	6,013	4.01%	8.29%	11.90%
Native Hawaiian or Pacific Islander alone (NH)	24	67	96	0.13%	0.16%	0.19%
Other race alone (NH)	35	97	322	0.19%	0.23%	0.64%
Mixed race or Multiracial (NH)	473	1,431	3,227	2.63%	3.40%	6.38%
Hispanic or Latino (any race)	896	3,802	5,494	4.97%	9.03%	10.87%
Total	18,016	42,108	50,547	100.00%	100.00%	100.00%

=== 2020 census ===
As of the 2020 census, El Dorado Hills had a population of 50,547. The median age was 45.0 years; 24.9% of residents were under the age of 18 and 19.1% were 65 years of age or older. For every 100 females there were 95.6 males, and for every 100 females age 18 and over there were 93.3 males age 18 and over.

92.6% of residents lived in urban areas, while 7.4% lived in rural areas.

There were 17,728 households in El Dorado Hills; 37.3% had children under the age of 18 living in them. Of all households, 70.7% were married-couple households, 9.3% were households with a male householder and no spouse or partner present, and 16.3% were households with a female householder and no spouse or partner present. About 14.5% of all households were made up of individuals, and 8.0% had someone living alone who was 65 years of age or older.

There were 18,249 housing units, of which 2.9% were vacant. The homeowner vacancy rate was 0.8% and the rental vacancy rate was 4.3%.

Racial composition as of the 2020 census
Race	Number	Percent
White	36,253	71.7%
Black or African American	708	1.4%
American Indian and Alaska Native	213	0.4%
Asian	6,071	12.0%
Native Hawaiian and Other Pacific Islander	112	0.2%
Some other race	1,192	2.4%
Two or more races	5,998	11.9%
Hispanic or Latino (of any race)	5,494	10.9%

=== 2010 census ===
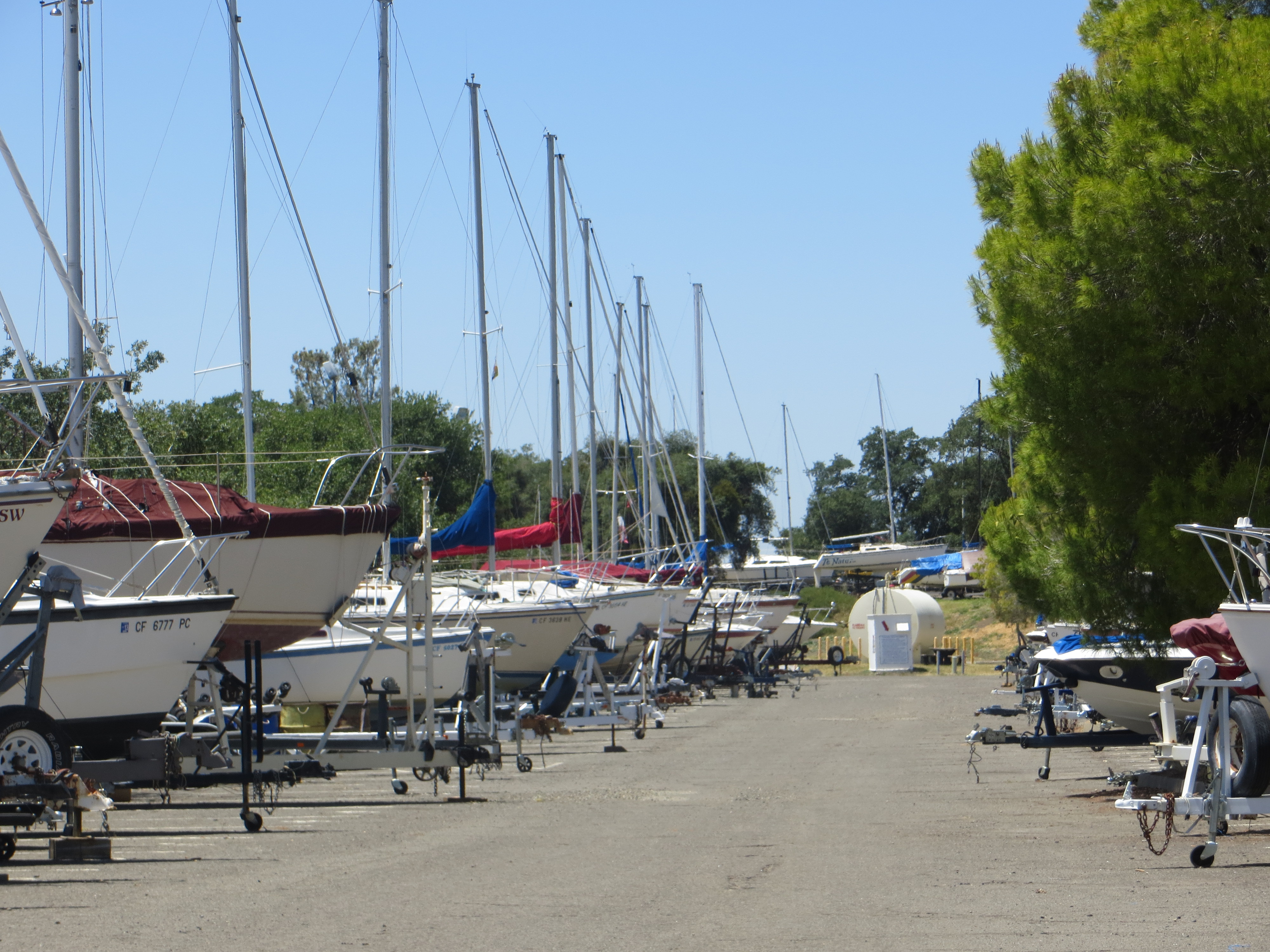
Folsom Lake Marina dockyards.

The 2010 United States census reported that El Dorado Hills had a population of 42,108. The population density was 866.3 inhabitants per square mile (334.5/km^{2}). The racial makeup of El Dorado Hills was 35,089 (83.3%) White, 615 (1.5%) African American, 196 (0.5%) Native American, 3,563 (8.5%) Asian, 71 (0.2%) Pacific Islander, 681 (1.6%) from other races, and 1,893 (4.5%) from two or more races. Hispanic or Latino of any race were 3,802 persons (9.0%).

The Census reported that 42,092 people (100% of the population) lived in households, 16 (0%) lived in non-institutionalized group quarters, and 0 (0%) were institutionalized.

There were 14,368 households, out of which 6,516 (45.4%) had children under the age of 18 living in them, 10,503 (73.1%) were opposite-sex married couples living together, 1,070 (7.4%) had a female householder with no husband present, 490 (3.4%) had a male householder with no wife present. There were 464 (3.2%) unmarried opposite-sex partnerships, and 85 (0.6%) same-sex married couples or partnerships. 1,798 households (12.5%) were made up of individuals, and 670 (4.7%) had someone living alone who was 65 years of age or older. The average household size was 2.93. There were 12,063 families (84.0% of all households); the average family size was 3.20.

The population was spread out, with 12,430 people (29.5%) under the age of 18, 2,511 people (6.0%) aged 18 to 24, 9,455 people (22.5%) aged 25 to 44, 13,232 people (31.4%) aged 45 to 64, and 4,480 people (10.6%) who were 65 years of age or older. The median age was 40.6 years. For every 100 females, there were 97.5 males. For every 100 females age 18 and over, there were 94.7 males.

There were 14,994 housing units at an average density of 308.5 per square mile (119.1/km^{2}), of which 14,368 were occupied, of which 12,169 (84.7%) were owner-occupied, and 2,199 (15.3%) were occupied by renters. The homeowner vacancy rate was 1.7%; the rental vacancy rate was 4.1%. 35,755 people (84.9% of the population) lived in owner-occupied housing units and 6,337 people (15.0%) lived in rental housing units.

=== 2000 census ===
As of the census of 2000, there were 18,016 people, 5,896 households, and 5,206 families residing in the CDP. The population density was 1,006.3 inhabitants per square mile (388.5/km^{2}). There were 6,071 housing units at an average density of 339.1 per square mile (130.9/km^{2}). SACOG's estimate for December, 2003 was 9,713 dwelling units.

The Census Bureaus's assessment of racial makeup of the CDP was 90.11% White, 0.77% Black or African American, 0.46% Native American, 4.11% Asian, 0.17% Pacific Islander, 1.37% from other races, and 3.01% from two or more races. 4.97% of the population were Hispanic or Latino of any race.

There were 5,896 households, out of which 50.7% had children under the age of 18 living with them, 79.5% were married couples living together, 6.5% had a female householder with no husband present, and 11.7% were non-families. 9.4% of all households were made up of individuals, and 2.7% had someone living alone who was 65 years of age or older. The average household size was 3.06 and the average family size was 3.26.

In the CDP, the population distribution was 33.2% under the age of 18, 4.5% from 18 to 24, 29.4% from 25 to 44, 25.6% from 45 to 64, and 7.3% who were 65 years of age or older. The median age was 38 years. For every 100 females, there were 99.3 males. For every 100 females age 18 and over, there were 96.0 males.

=== Income ===
In 2023, the US Census Bureau estimated that the median household income was $163,544, and the per capita income was $74,670. About 3.3% of families and 3.7% of the population were below the poverty line.

According to a 2007 estimate, the median income for a household in the CDP was $113,927, and the median income for a family was $125,230. Males had a median income of $75,369 versus $45,978 for females. The per capita income for the CDP was $40,239. 1.7% of the population and 1.5% of families were below the poverty line. Out of the total population, 1.5% of those under the age of 18 and 2.2% of those 65 and older were living below the poverty line.

El Dorado Hills is among the highest income communities of its size range in the nation, though this is seldom noted because of its unincorporated status. El Dorado Hills would rank 3rd highest by median household income in a list of places with population greater than 40,000, following only Potomac, Maryland and Danville, California.

=== Other estimates ===
Total population within the El Dorado Hills Community Services District (CSD) was certified as 35,276 in January 2006 by the California State Department of Finance. The El Dorado Hills Fire Department reported a population of 42,078 in its service area at the end of 2007. The Fire Department's district covers a larger geographic area than the CSD and is more nearly equivalent to the El Dorado County definition of the El Dorado Hills Community Region.

== Government ==
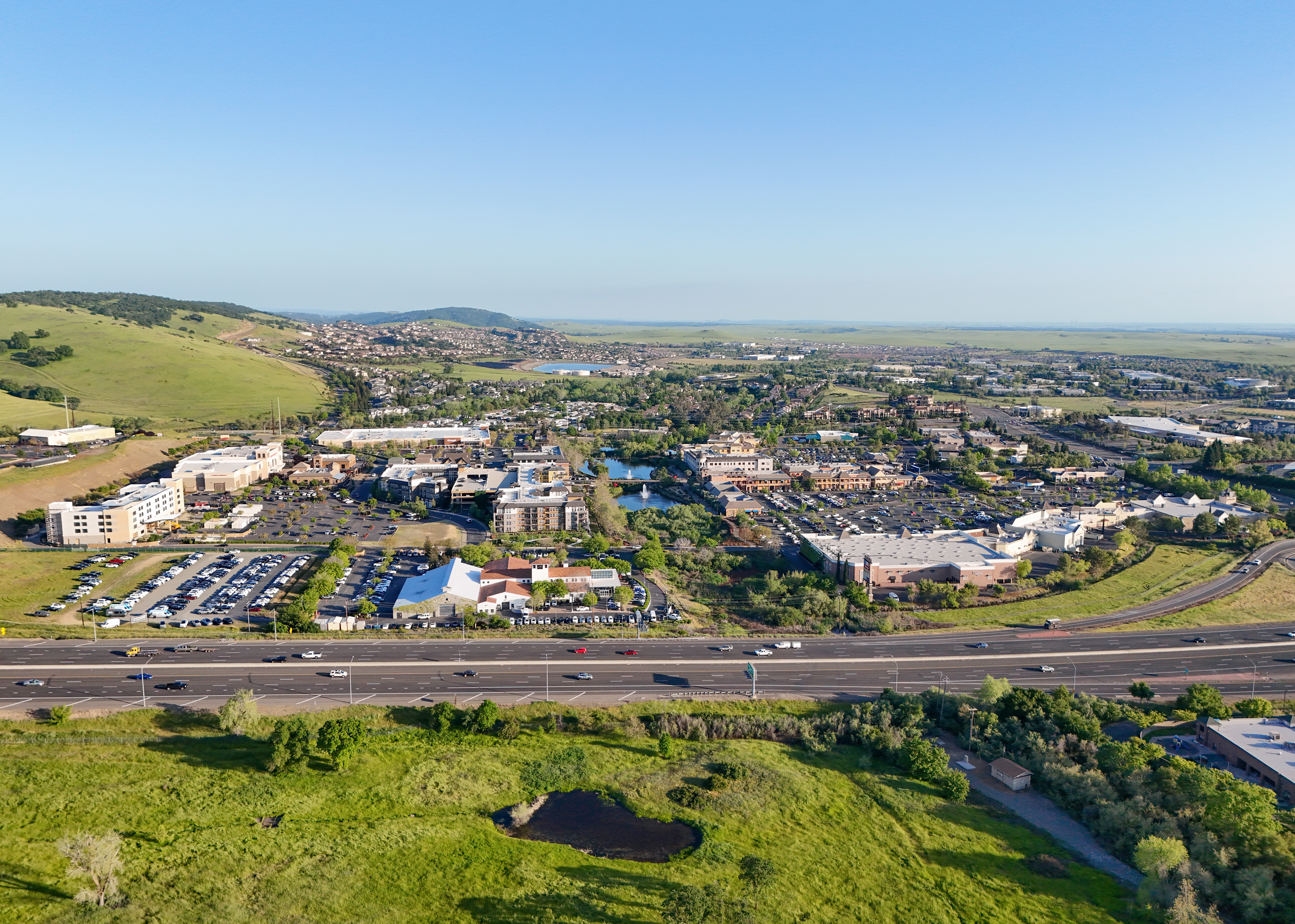
Aerial view of El Dorado Hills

In the California State Legislature, El Dorado Hills is in the 4th senatorial district, represented by Republican Marie Alvarado-Gil, and the 5th Assembly district, represented by Republican Joe Patterson.

In the United States House of Representatives, El Dorado Hills is in California's 5th Congressional District represented by Republican Tom McClintock.

As an unincorporated area, the local government of El Dorado Hills is that of El Dorado County. Two supervisorial districts include parts of El Dorado Hills. District 1 is represented by Greg Ferrero and District 2 by George Turnboo.

A number of services are provided by other local agencies. These include the El Dorado Hills Community Services District (CSD), the Rolling Hills Community Services District (CSD), the Marble Mountain Community Services District, the El Dorado Hills County Water District (fire department), and the El Dorado Irrigation District.

== Education ==
The CDP is divided among three elementary school districts: Rescue Union Elementary School District, Buckeye Union Elementary School District, and Latrobe Elementary School District. All of the CDP is served by the El Dorado Union High School District.

== People ==
- Cimorelli – YouTube singing group consisting of five sisters; born in El Dorado Hills, but moved to Nashville, Tennessee.
- Austin Collie – NFL wide receiver, Indianapolis Colts, Brigham Young University
- Ryan Anderson – NBA power forward, Houston Rockets, UC Berkeley
- Seyi Ajirotutu – NFL wide receiver – San Diego Chargers
- Derrek Lee – first baseman, Atlanta Braves
- Stephen Sanchez – singer and songwriter
- F. P. Santangelo – major league baseball player (1995–2001) who played for the Montreal Expos, San Francisco Giants, Los Angeles Dodgers, and Oakland Athletics.
- Rick Schu – retired major league baseball player and active assistant hitting coach for the San Francisco Giants.
- Joe Angel – retired sportscaster
- Jacoby Shaddix – lead singer, Papa Roach
- Cheri Elliott – champion cyclist, including two X-Games Gold Medals, United States Bicycling Hall of Fame and the National BMX Hall of Fame.
- Ian Book – quarterback for the Notre Dame Fighting Irish football team. Graduate of Oak Ridge High School. Led NCAA in Quarterback completion percentage (74.8%) for the 2018–2019 season. Drafted by the New Orleans Saints in the 4th round, 133rd overall, of the 2021 NFL draft.
- Joanne Witt – murder victim, stabbed to death on June 11, 2009, by her 14-year old daughter and her daughter's boyfriend

== Bibliography ==
- C. Michael Hogan and Marc Papineau, "Phase I Environmental Site Assessment", Four Mile Search Area, El Dorado Hills, California, March 7, 1989
- El Dorado Local Agency Formation Committee, "Final Environmental Impact Report for the Incorporation of El Dorado Hills", May 12, 2005
