= Seyi Ajirotutu =

American football player (born 1987)

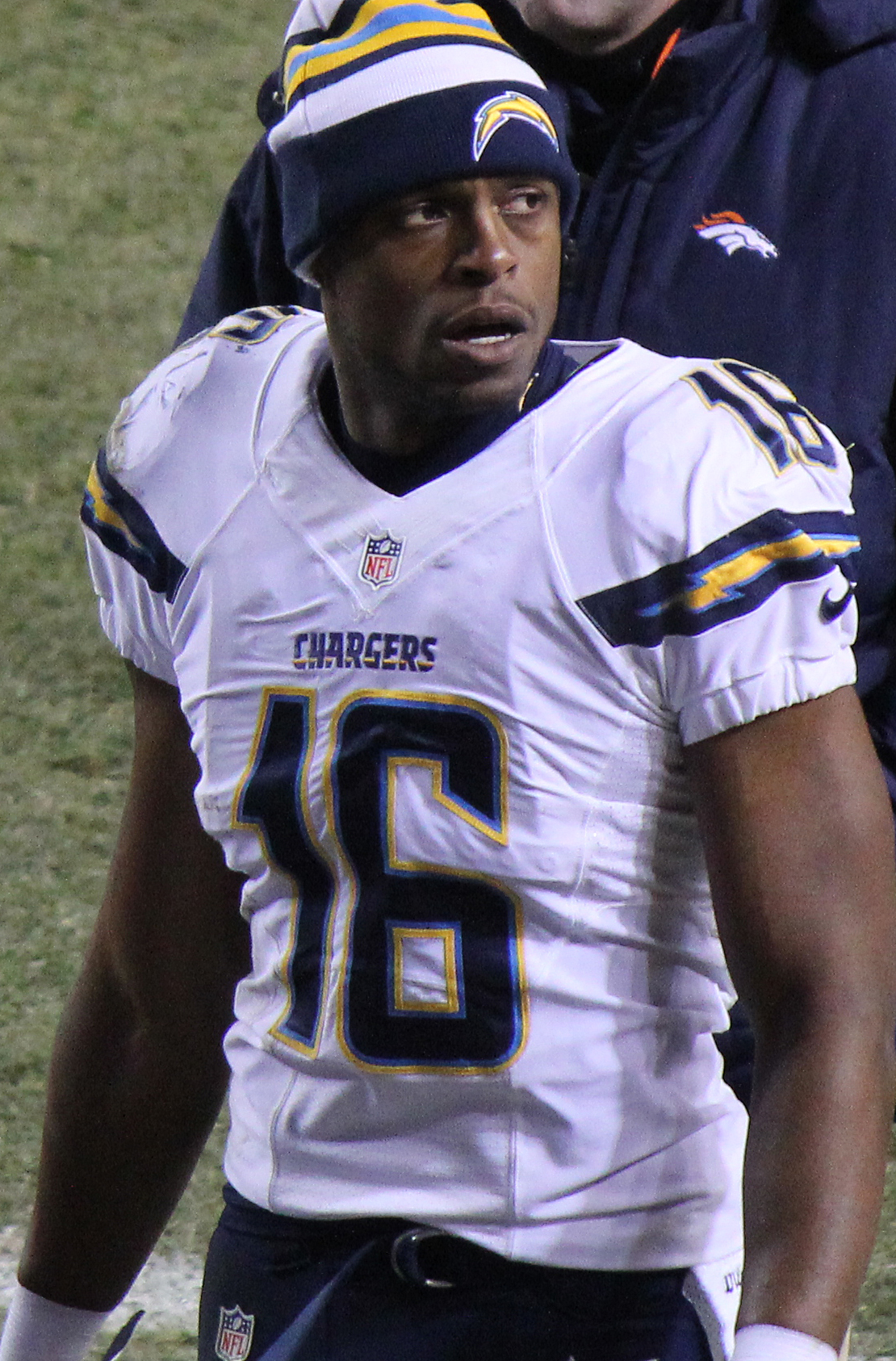
- Ajirotutu in 2013 with the San Diego Chargers

No. 13, 16, 19, 89
- Position: Wide receiver / Special teamer

Personal information
- Born: June 12, 1987 (age 39); El Dorado Hills, California, U.S.
- Listed height: 6 ft 3 in (1.91 m)
- Listed weight: 215 lb (98 kg)

Career information
- High school: Oak Ridge (El Dorado Hills)
- College: Fresno State (2005–2009)
- NFL draft: 2010: undrafted

Career history
- San Diego Chargers (2010); Carolina Panthers (2011); San Diego Chargers (2012−2014); Philadelphia Eagles (2015)

Career NFL statistics
- Receptions: 25
- Receiving yards: 424
- Receiving average: 17
- Receiving touchdowns: 3
- Total tackles: 46
- Forced fumbles: 2
- Stats at Pro Football Reference

Oluseyi Adekunleolum Ajirotutu (born June 12, 1987) is an American former professional football player who was a wide receiver and special teamer in the National Football League (NFL). He played college football for the Fresno State Bulldogs and was signed by the San Diego Chargers as an undrafted free agent in 2010.

Ajirotutu has also played for the Carolina Panthers and Philadelphia Eagles.

== Early life ==
Ajirotutu attended Oak Ridge High School in El Dorado Hills, California from 2001 to 2005. As a junior, Ajirotutu was selected to the First-Team All-League as a defensive back after making 70 tackles and picking off five passes. As a senior during the 2004–2005 season, he caught 77 passes for 1,205 yards and 17 touchdowns, leading all divisions in the Sac-Joaquin section. Ajirotutu had a monster game in the section championship against Del Oro with six receptions for 194 yards and three touchdowns, and at safety he made 15 tackles, eight of them solo. At season's end, he was selected as the Most Valuable Player on the Sacramento Bee All-Metro team after leading Oak Ridge to the Sac-Joaquin Section Division II championship. Additionally, Ajirotutu was selected as the Sierra Conference co-Defensive Player of the Year after tallying 95 tackles, five interceptions and a blocked punt. Ajirotutu was a two-year varsity letter winner and was selected to both the Cal-Hi Sports second-team all-state and the first-team All-NorCal.

== College career ==
Ajirotutu played college football at California State University, Fresno. In 2005, he redshirted as a freshman. In 2009, he was selected Second Team All-Western Athletic Conference as voted on by the WAC head coaches. Ajirotutu led the Bulldogs with 48 receptions for 677 yards and seven touchdowns.

== Professional career ==
=== San Diego Chargers (2010) ===
Ajirotutu was not selected in the 2010 NFL draft but joined the team shortly after as an undrafted free agent. Ajirotutu received playing time due to the many injuries. He had a breakout game during week 9 on November 7, 2010, when he caught 4 catches for 111 yards and two touchdowns in the Chargers win over the Houston Texans. He ended the season with 13 catches for 262 yards and two touchdowns. He was waived on September 3, 2011.

=== Carolina Panthers (2011) ===
On September 4, 2011, Ajirotutu was claimed off waivers by the Carolina Panthers.

On August 31, 2012, the day directly following their final preseason game in 2012, he was cut by the Panthers.

=== San Diego Chargers (2012−2014) ===
On October 29, 2012, Ajirotutu was again signed by the Chargers after Richard Goodman was put on injured reserve for the remainder of the season. Ajirotutu would later be placed on injured reserve for the remainder of the 2012 season.

On August 16, 2013, Ajirotutu was re-signed by the San Diego Chargers. On November 24, he caught a game-winning touchdown pass with 24 seconds left on the clock against the Kansas City Chiefs.

In 2014, he was voted by his teammates as the Chargers' Special Teams Player of the Year

=== Philadelphia Eagles (2015) ===
On April 7, 2015, the Philadelphia Eagles signed Ajirotutu to a one-year deal.

=== Career statistics ===
Year	Team	Games	Rec.	Tgts.	Rec. Yards	Avg.	Long	TDs	First Downs	Fum.	Fum. Lost
2010	SD	10	13	23	262	20.2	55	2	12	0	0
2011	CAR	14	1	2	4	4.0	4	0	1	0	0
2012	SD	3	3	4	45	15.0	28	0	2	0	0
2013	SD	14	3	4	64	21.3	26	1	3	0	0
Total	Total	41	20	33	375	18.8	55	3	18	0	0

== Personal life ==
Seyi married Autumn Ajirotutu in 2012, who appeared on the E! reality show WAGS for 3 seasons. They are the parents to twin girls Londyn and Laiyah. The couple divorced in 2020 and it was finalized in 2021. His father, Leke, was born in Nigeria.
