= Oak Ridge High School (El Dorado Hills, California) =

Location
- 1120 Harvard Way; El Dorado Hills, California; 95762; United States; 38.68037°N 121.07187°W

Information
- Type: Public
- Established: 1980
- School district: El Dorado Union High School District
- Principal: Aaron Palm
- Staff: 97.37 (FTE)
- Enrollment: 2,375 (2023–2024)
- Student to teacher ratio: 24.39
- Colors: Navy blue and gold
- Mascot: Trojan
- Website: orhs.eduhsd.k12.ca.us

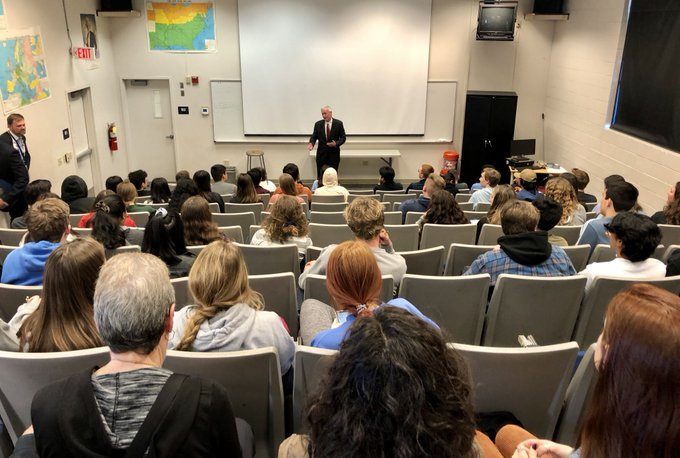
Congressman Tom McClintock speaking to students at Oak Ridge High School in 2020

Oak Ridge High School is a public high school in El Dorado Hills, California, United States, 20 miles (32 km) east of Sacramento. It is part of the El Dorado Union High School District. Oak Ridge High School was established in 1980 with 222 students. As of the 2019–20 school year, Oak Ridge High School had 2,470 students. The school's principal is Aaron Palm.

== Academics ==
Oak Ridge offers a wide range of classes in history, English, foreign languages, mathematics, science, physical education, and electives, as well as a large drama and art department. The school offers foreign languages such as Japanese, French, and Spanish. Oak Ridge is in the 96th percentile among Californian schools in SAT scores and has a 99.1% graduation rate as of 2008. The school was measured at 865 in the 2008 Academic Performance Index, compared with the California State average of 742 in 2008.

The school currently offers the following AP Classes: Biology, Calculus AB, Calculus BC, Chemistry, Computer Science A, Computer Science Principles, English Language, English Literature, Environmental Science, French Language, Microeconomics, Physics C, Psychology, Spanish Language, Statistics, U.S. History, U.S. Government, and World History.

== Alma mater ==
When sung or played, it goes to the tune of Cornell University's alma mater, "Far Above Cayuga's Waters". The song is intoned at the end of all ORHS football games, with the second verse and chorus omitted. The Oak Ridge marching band also plays and then sings the alma mater following each home football game.

== Athletics ==
Oak Ridge is a member of the Division I Sierra Foothill League. Previously it spent 15 years as a member of the Sierra Valley Conference of the Sac-Joaquin Section of the CIF. The school offers an extensive list of sports programs to its students, including baseball, cross country, football, basketball, golf, lacrosse, soccer, ski and snowboard, softball, swimming, tennis, track and field, volleyball, water polo, and wrestling. Several sports are available through school-affiliated clubs, such as the Mother Lode Rugby Club, which combines men's and women's rugby for all of El Dorado County's high school students. Oak Ridge has had many student-athlete alumni go on to compete nationally at collegiate or professional levels.

=== Championships ===
The Oak Ridge football team won the D-II California State Championship in both 2003 and 2004, led by Austin Collie and Seyi Ajirotutu. After playing five seasons in the NFL and one season in the Canadian Football League, Collie retired from football in 2016. Ajirotutu played six seasons in the NFL.

Oak Ridge Basketball won the 2010 D-I California Women's State Championship. The boys won the D-II California State Championship in 2005.

Oak Ridge Trojans swim team won the CIF State swimming championship in May 2016 and May 2017. The Trojans also placed 2nd in May 2018. Most recently in May 2019 the Oak Ridge boys' swim team again placed second out of 236 California High School finalists in the CIF swim championships.

Oak Ridge's Girls Track and Field team placed 2nd in the 2018 CIF State Championships.

Oak Ridge Girls Varsity Soccer team won the Sac-Joaquin Section Championship in February 2020.

Oak Ridge Girls Varsity Soccer team won the NorCal State Championship in March 2022.

== Notable alumni ==
- Seyi Ajirotutu, former professional football player, Carolina Panthers, Philadelphia Eagles, and San Diego Chargers
- Lonni Alameda, former professional softball player and head softball coach at Florida State University
- Ryan Anderson, former professional basketball player
- Ian Book, former professional football player, New Orleans Saints and Philadelphia Eagles
- Sam Clemons, former Arena Football League player
- Austin Collie, former professional football player, Indianapolis Colts and New England Patriots
- Ross Dwelley, professional football player, San Francisco 49ers
- Kaleb Edwards, college football tight end for the Alabama Crimson Tide
- Robert Gasser, professional baseball player, Milwaukee Brewers
- Justin Lamson, college football quarterback for the Montana State Bobcats
- Bryce Mefford, 2020 Summer Olympics swimmer
- Jaslyn Ome, model and actress, Playboy's Miss April 2013
- Marvin Philip, former professional football player, Buffalo Bills, Cleveland Browns, and Pittsburgh Steelers
- Stephen Sanchez, singer and songwriter
- F. P. Santangelo, former professional baseball player, Los Angeles Dodgers, Montreal Expos, Oakland Athletics, and San Francisco Giants
- Shane Steichen, head coach of the Indianapolis Colts
- Kimberly Weinberger, actress

== Controversies/Incidents ==
On February 25, 2016, during a girls varsity basketball game where Oak Ridge was playing C. K. McClatchy High School at home, the Oak Ridge student section was accused of chanting racial slurs toward C.K McClatchy's Asian players. Oak Ridge's principal later issued a statement detailing the disciplinary actions the school would take.

In November 2018, Oak Ridge teacher Colleen Sanders reported receiving violent threats from a student, including "shooting up the school". Sanders detailed how she experienced PTSD from the ordeal. The El Dorado Union High School district worked with local law enforcement to investigate the threat. An expulsion hearing was held for the student.

In February 2022, Oak Ridge students staged a mass walkout over the El Dorado Union High School district’s mask mandate. The El Dorado Union High School district later changed its mask enforcement policies, making masks not mandatory but recommended.

On March 5, 2022, during a girls varsity soccer game where Oak Ridge was playing Buchanan High School (Clovis, California) at home, an Oak Ridge student made racial taunts which were audible monkey and barking sounds that could be heard across the stadium. This occurred during a shootout after the game went into overtime. Barking sounds were first made after a Buchanan player of Hispanic race took their shot. Later, an African American Buchanan player took a shot and monkey noises followed right after. Oak Ridge's principal, Aaron Palm, later issued an apology to Buchanan administrators, including the Buchanan athletic director, and stated that a full investigation was made to determine the student who made the noises.

In 2023 the Oak Ridge High School football team was allegedly involved in a hazing ritual at a team retreat. The school and local law enforcement are investigating the reports. By August 9 one student had reportedly been expelled.

On January 26, 2026, former band teacher Paul Varoff was arrested for 10 charges related to child sexual abuse. Paul had taught music for more than 30 years.
