= Rescue Union School District =

School district in California, United States

Address
- 2390 Bass Lake Road Rescue, California, 95672; United States

District information
- Type: Public
- Grades: K–8
- NCES District ID: 0632310

Students and staff
- Students: 3,426
- Teachers: 155.89 (FTE)
- Staff: 171.9 (FTE)
- Student–teacher ratio: 21.98:1

Other information
- Website: www.rescueusd.org

The Rescue Union School District is a public school district in El Dorado County, California, United States. The district operates five elementary (K - 5) schools and two middle (6 - 8) schools. In the late 1980s the district began experiencing rapid growth in the student population due to areawide development; by 1990, when it consisted of four schools, it began to plan for serving an enlarged population.

Schools:

- Lake Forest Elementary School
- Lakeview Elementary School
- Jackson Elementary School
- Green Valley Elementary School
- Rescue Elementary School
- Marina Village Middle School
- Pleasant Grove Middle School

== See also ==
- El Dorado Hills
