= Ponderosa High School (California) =

Location
- 3661 Ponderosa Rd; Shingle Springs, California 95682; United States; 38°40′23″N 120°56′32″W

Information
- Type: Public
- Established: 1963
- School district: El Dorado Union High School District
- Superintendent: Ron Carruth
- Principal: Jeremy Hunt
- Teaching staff: 71.96 (FTE)
- Enrollment: 1,689 (2023-2024)
- Student to teacher ratio: 23.47
- Colors: Pine green and gray
- Nickname: Bruins
- Rival: Eldorado High School
- Website: PHS website

Ponderosa High School is a public high school in Shingle Springs, California. Opened in 1963, it is a member of the El Dorado Union High School District in El Dorado County, California.

In the 2018–19 school year, there were 1,865 students enrolled. Ponderosa's mascot is the bruin bear.

== Sports ==
Ponderosa High School offers many sports programs, including cross country, basketball, baseball, football, golf, ski/snowboard, soccer, swimming, softball, tennis, track and field, volleyball, water polo and wrestling. The school is in the Division II Capital Valley Conference.

== Notable alumni ==
- Maria Alexander, author
- James Campen, former NFL offensive lineman; current offensive line coach of the Carolina Panthers
- Kurt Travis, lead singer for Sacramento-based post-hardcore band Dance Gavin Dance
- Valorie Kondos Field, former UCLA Bruins women's gymnastics head coach
- Joy Selig Petersen, gymnast
- Michael Stemmle, game designer
- Trevor Swartz, professional soccer player
- Joe Bitker, former MLB pitcher for the Oakland A's and Texas Rangers
- Tim Jones, former MLB pitcher for the Pittsburgh Pirates
- Christina Fusano, professional tennis player
- Colleen Shannon, disc Jockey and model
- Brad Waldow, professional basketball player
- Amber Coffman, professional singer and songwriter

== Location ==
Ponderosa High School is located in the Shingle Springs, CA.
