= Shingle Springs, California =

Shingle Springs
- Census-designated place
- Location in El Dorado County and the state of California

- Location in the United States
- Coordinates: 38°39′57″N 120°55′34″W
- Country: United States
- State: California
- County: El Dorado

Area
  - Total: 8.237 sq mi (21.335 km^{2})
  - Land: 8.199 sq mi (21.235 km^{2})
  - Water: 0.039 sq mi (0.100 km^{2}) 0.47%
- Elevation: 1,421 ft (433 m)

Population (2020)
  - Total: 4,660
  - Density: 568/sq mi (219/km^{2})
- Time zone: UTC-8 (Pacific (PST))
  - Summer (DST): UTC-7 (PDT)
- ZIP code: 95682
- Area codes: 530, 837
- FIPS code: 06-71554
- GNIS feature ID: 1659645

California Historical Landmark
- Reference no.: 456

Shingle Springs (formerly, Shingle Spring and Shingle) is a census-designated place (CDP) in El Dorado County, California, United States. The population was 4,660 at the 2020 census, up from 4,432 at the 2010 census. It is located about 40 miles (64 km) from Sacramento in the Gold Country foothills and sits directly on Highway 50. The towns of Coloma and Placerville are less than 15 miles (24 km) away.

Shingle Springs is part of the Sacramento metropolitan area. The Shingle Springs Band of Miwok Indians, a federally recognized tribe of Maidu and Miwok people, are headquartered in Shingle Springs.

== History ==
Like many of the other towns in California's Mother Lode, Shingle Springs grew out of a camp set up by gold miners during the California Gold Rush - in this case, a group of "49ers" who'd followed the Carson-Emigrant Trail through Pleasant Valley, Nevada. The community took its name from a horse-drawn shingle machine capable of producing 16,000 shingles a day that was located near the springs at the western edge of the camp.

A rich store of written records preserved by Shingle Springs pioneers has left a detailed picture of the Gold Rush. For example, the Boston-Newton Joint Stock Association, which left Boston on April 16, 1849, camped there the night before their arrival at Sutter's Fort on September 27, after a remarkable journey across the continent. The "Shingle Spring" post office also operated from 1853 to 1855. The "Shingle Springs" post office opened in 1865. The office's name was changed to "Shingle" in 1895, and reverted in 1955. As a result, the town is now designated California Historical Landmark #456.

Before the area was settled by Anglo-Americans, a Maidu village called Bamom was located in the vicinity of modern-day Shingle Springs.

== Geography ==
According to the United States Census Bureau, the CDP has a total area of 8.2 square miles (21 km^{2}), of which over 99% is land.

For the 2000 census, the CDP had a total area of 5.2 square miles (13 km^{2}), of which 5.2 square miles (13 km^{2}) was land and 0.19% was water.

== Demographics ==
Historical population
Census	Pop.	Note	%±
1980	1,268		—
1990	2,049		61.6%
2000	2,643		29.0%
2010	4,432		67.7%
2020	4,660		5.1%
U.S. Decennial Census; 1850–1870 1880-1890; 1900 1910 1920; 1930 1940 1950; 1960 1970 1980; 1990 2000 2010

Shingle Springs first appeared as a census designated place in the 1980 U.S. census.

=== Racial and ethnic composition ===
Shingle Springs CDP, California – Racial and ethnic composition Note: the US Census treats Hispanic/Latino as an ethnic category. This table excludes Latinos from the racial categories and assigns them to a separate category. Hispanics/Latinos may be of any race.
Race / Ethnicity (NH = Non-Hispanic)	Pop 2000	Pop 2010	Pop 2020	% 2000	% 2010	% 2020
White alone (NH)	2,318	3,651	3,599	87.70%	82.38%	77.23%
Black or African American alone (NH)	10	13	18	0.38%	0.29%	0.39%
Native American or Alaska Native alone (NH)	25	96	31	0.95%	2.17%	0.67%
Asian alone (NH)	38	48	72	1.44%	1.08%	1.55%
Native Hawaiian or Pacific Islander alone (NH)	3	2	11	0.11%	0.05%	0.24%
Other race alone (NH)	0	14	35	0.00%	0.32%	0.75%
Mixed race or Multiracial (NH)	74	139	277	2.80%	3.14%	5.94%
Hispanic or Latino (any race)	175	469	617	6.62%	10.58%	13.24%
Total	2,643	4,432	4,660	100.00%	100.00%	100.00%

=== 2020 census ===
As of the 2020 census, Shingle Springs had a population of 4,660. The population density was 568.4 inhabitants per square mile (219.5/km^{2}). 78.2% of residents lived in urban areas, while 21.8% lived in rural areas.

The whole population lived in households. There were 1,727 households, out of which 27.5% included children under the age of 18, 60.5% were married-couple households, 4.7% were cohabiting couple households, 21.0% had a female householder with no partner present, and 13.8% had a male householder with no partner present. 21.9% of households were one person, and 13.4% were one person aged 65 or older. The average household size was 2.7. There were 1,248 families (72.3% of all households).

The age distribution was 20.9% under the age of 18, 7.1% aged 18 to 24, 18.6% aged 25 to 44, 28.3% aged 45 to 64, and 25.0% who were 65 years of age or older. The median age was 47.9 years. For every 100 females, there were 92.0 males. For every 100 females age 18 and over, there were 88.6 males age 18 and over.

There were 1,791 housing units at an average density of 218.4 units per square mile (84.3 units/km^{2}), of which 1,727 (96.4%) were occupied. Of these, 77.6% were owner-occupied, and 22.4% were occupied by renters. 3.6% of housing units were vacant; the homeowner vacancy rate was 0.4% and the rental vacancy rate was 3.3%.

== Politics ==
In the state legislature, Shingle Springs is in the 4th senatorial district, represented by Republican Marie Alvarado-Gil, and the 5th Assembly district, represented by Republican Joe Patterson.

Federally, Shingle Springs is in California's 5th congressional district, represented by Republican Tom McClintock.

== Education ==
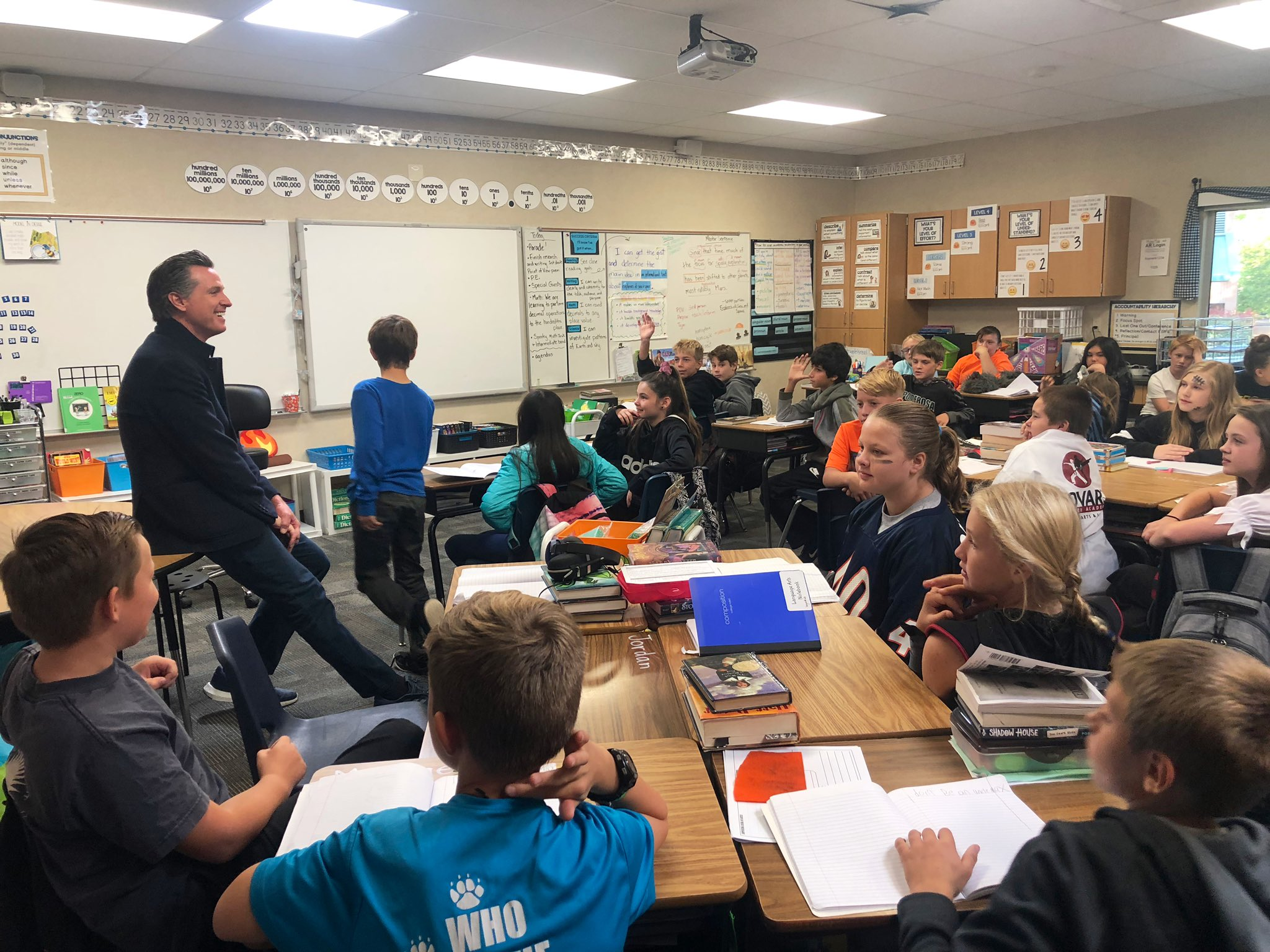
California Governor Gavin Newsom visiting Blue Oak Elementary in Shingle Springs in 2019.

The CDP is divided between two elementary school districts: Rescue Union Elementary School District and Buckeye Union Elementary School District. All of the CDP is in the El Dorado Union High School District.

The facility of Latrobe Elementary School District. has a mailing address of Shingle Springs, CA, while no portions of the Shingle Springs CDP are in the Latrobe school district.

Local schools:

- Buckeye Elementary School
- California Montessori Project
- Pleasant Grove Middle School
- Ponderosa High School
- Latrobe Elementary School
- Miller's Hill Middle School
- Rescue Elementary School

== Climate ==
The Köppen Climate Classification subtype for this climate is "Csa" (Mediterranean Climate).
