= El Dorado High School (Placerville, California) =

Public school in the United States

Location
- 561 Canal Street; Placerville, California 95667; United States; 38.73265°N 120.81221°W

Information
- Type: Public
- Established: 1928
- School district: El Dorado Union High School District
- Principal: Troy Gassaway
- Staff: 55.35 (FTE)
- Grades: 9-12
- Student to teacher ratio: 21.59
- Colors: Royal blue and white
- Athletics conference: Sierra Valley Conference
- Mascot: Cougar
- Website: cougar.eduhsd.k12.ca.us

El Dorado High School is a public high school in Placerville, California, United States. EDHS is one of six high schools in the El Dorado Union High School District, it is a California Distinguished School.

== Statistics ==
=== Demographics ===
2016-17

White	African American	Asian	Latino	American Indian	Two or More Races	Not Reported
72%	1%	0.8%	19.6%	1.9%	3.4%	0.1%

SAT Scores for 2015-16
	Math Average	Reading Average	Writing Average
El Dorado High	534	551	522
District	566	543	530
Statewide	494	484	477

== Notable alumni ==
- Andre Fili, UFC fighter
- Toby Hall, catcher for the Chicago White Sox
- Thomas Kinkade, painter
- Spider Sabich, professional and Olympic skier
- Skip Vanderbundt, linebacker with the San Francisco Forty-Niners
