= El Dorado Union High School District =

School district in California, United States

Location
- 4675 Missouri Flat Road, Placerville, California, United States, 95667

District information
- Grades: 9-12
- Superintendent: Ron Carruth
- Asst. superintendent(s): Robert Whittenberg; Christopher Moore; Tony Deville
- Schools: Union Mine High School; Ponderosa High School; El Dorado High School; Oak Ridge High School

Students and staff
- Students: 6,847 (2013)

Other information
- Website: www.eduhsd.k12.ca.us

El Dorado Union High School District is a public 9-12th grade school district located in the southern half of El Dorado County, California.

== Schools ==
There are four comprehensive high schools in the district

- El Dorado High School, Placerville (est. 1928)
- Oak Ridge High School, El Dorado Hills (est. 1980)
- Ponderosa High School, Shingle Springs (est. 1963)
- Union Mine High School, El Dorado (est. 1999)

== Planning ==
The district has a considerable track record of advanced planning. In the late 1980s the district embarked on an analysis of long term forecasting including district population forecasts, employer surveys, economic development within the district and household formations. The El Dorado Union High School District produced initial forecasts that led to a set of facilities plans and developer fee structures to sustain the development and expansion of district facilities. (Earth Metrics Inc, 1989)

== Bibliography ==
Relation of commercial and industrial growth to the need for additional school facilities in the El Dorado Union High School District , Earth Metrics Inc., Sept. 1989
