= Waca Lake =

Lake in the state of California, United States

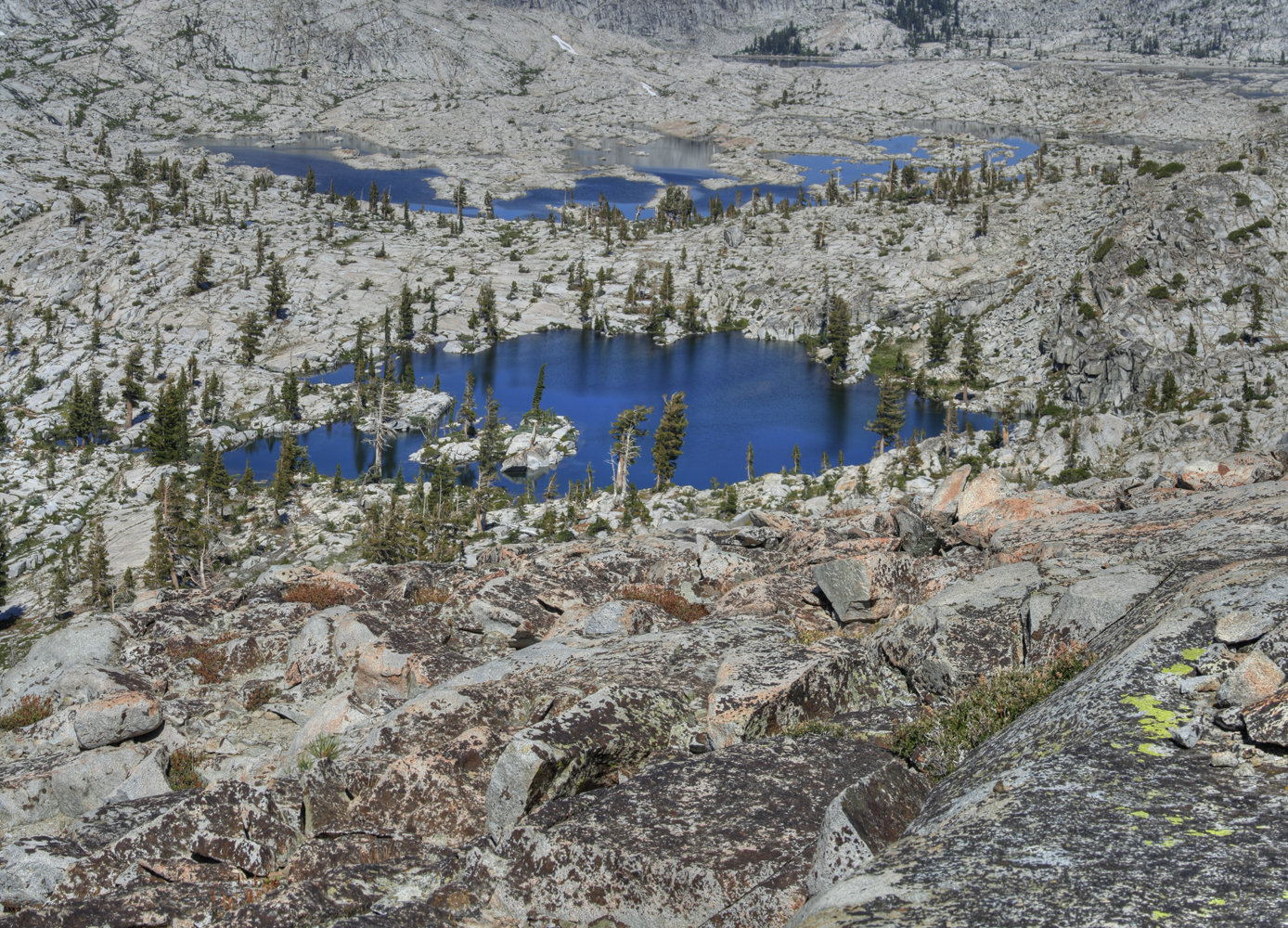
- at the base of the Crystal Range

- Location within California Location within the United States
- Location: Desolation Wilderness, Sierra Nevada, El Dorado County, California, United States
- Coordinates: 38°51′18″N 120°08′30″W
- Basin countries: United States
- Surface elevation: 8,179 feet (2,493 m)

Waca Lake is a backcountry lake in the Desolation Wilderness in the Sierra Nevada mountain range of California. It lies just south of Lake Aloha.

== See also ==
- List of lakes in California
