= Middle Mountain =

Mountain in California, United States of America

- Location within California

Highest point
- Elevation: 8,337 ft (2,541 m) NAVD 88
- Prominence: 453 ft (138 m)
- Coordinates: 38°57′24″N 120°10′53″W

Geography
- Location: El Dorado County, California, U.S.
- Parent range: Sierra Nevada
- Topo map: USGS Rockbound Valley

Climbing
- Easiest route: Hike and simple scramble, class 1-2

Middle Mountain is a mountain in the Sierra Nevada mountain range to the west of Lake Tahoe in the Desolation Wilderness in El Dorado County, California. The mountain is east of the Crystal Range and Rockbound Valley, and west of Emerald Bay and Lake Tahoe.

Middle Mountain rises to an elevation of approximately 8,337 feet (2,541 meters) above sea level. The peak is part of the rugged terrain of the Desolation Wilderness, a federally protected area known for its granite landscapes, alpine lakes, and dense forest cover.

The mountain and surrounding area are popular with hikers and backpackers, particularly along the nearby Pacific Crest Trail and Desolation Wilderness routes that offer access to scenic viewpoints over Lake Tahoe and the Crystal Range. Access to Middle Mountain is typically from trailheads such as Eagle Falls and Dicks Pass, which provide routes into the high country of the Sierra Nevada.

Geologically, Middle Mountain consists primarily of granodiorite and other intrusive igneous rocks that formed during the Mesozoic era, like much of the Sierra Nevada batholith. The area’s characteristic glacially carved valleys and cirques were shaped during the last Ice Age.
