= Lyons trailhead =

Trail in California

Coordinates: 38°48′39.12″N 120°14′24.88″W

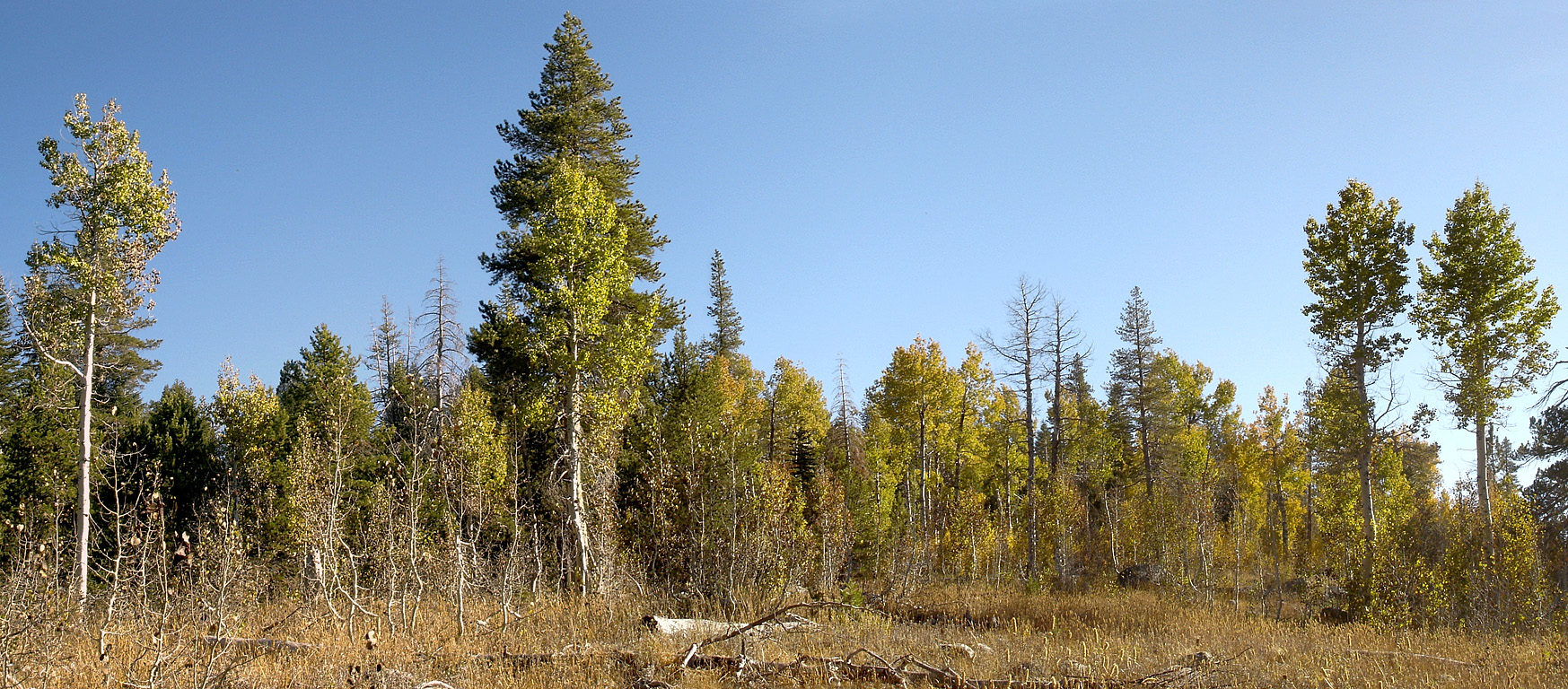
Aspens along the trail.

The Lyons trailhead or Lyons Creek trailhead is located on Wrights Lake Road off Highway 50 about halfway to Wrights Lake.

Some of the destinations most accessed by the trailhead are Lyons Lake (6 miles (9.7 km)) and Sylvia Lake (6 miles (9.7 km)) as well as the rest of the Desolation Wilderness. The summit of Pyramid Peak (California) can be reached from this trailhead as well. The trail leads east from the trailhead and follows along the southern edge of Lyons creek for several miles.
