= Dicks Peak =

Mountain in the state of California

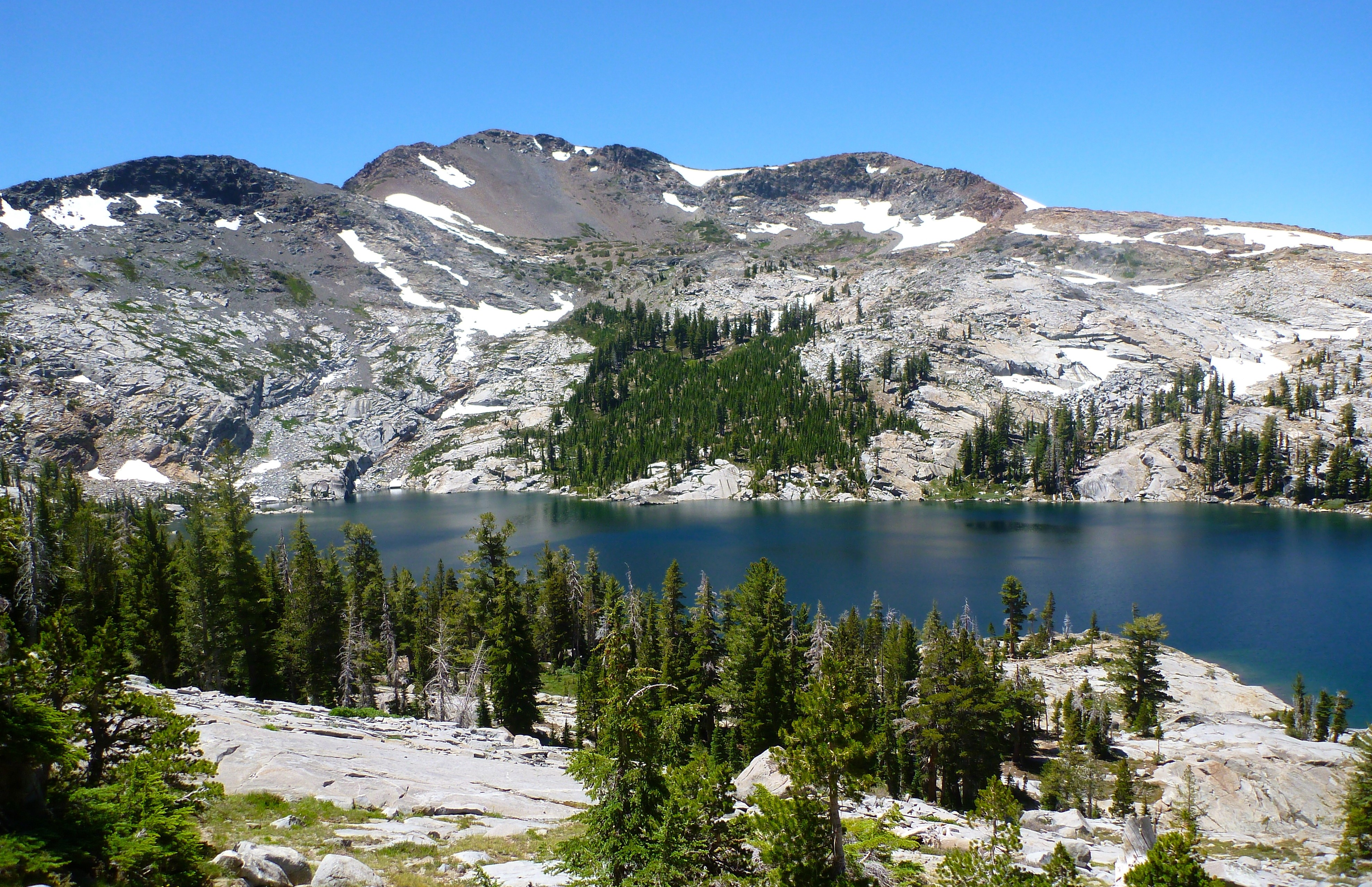
- Northeast aspect, with Dicks Lake

Highest point
- Elevation: 9,974 ft (3,040 m)
- Prominence: 1,534 ft (468 m)
- Parent peak: Mount Price (9,979 ft)
- Isolation: 2.83 mi (4.55 km)
- Listing: Sierra Peaks Section
- Coordinates: 38°54′02″N 120°09′03″W

Naming
- Etymology: Captain Richard "Dick" Barter

Geography
- Location within California Location within the United States
- Location: El Dorado County, California, U.S.
- Parent range: Sierra Nevada
- Topo map: USGS Rockbound Valley

Geology
- Rock type: Metamorphic rock

Climbing
- Easiest route: class 2 via Dicks Pass

Dicks Peak is a 9,974-foot-elevation (3,040-meter) mountain summit located in the Sierra Nevada mountain range in El Dorado County, California, United States. It is the third-highest peak in the Desolation Wilderness, and is set on land managed by Eldorado National Forest. It is situated six miles (9.7 km) south of Lake Tahoe, and approximately eight miles (13 km) west of the community of South Lake Tahoe. Topographic relief is significant as the west aspect rises over 2,300 feet (700 meters) above Rockbound Valley in approximately one mile. One-half mile east of the peak the Pacific Crest Trail and Tahoe Rim Trail traverse Dicks Pass, which provides an approach option for those climbing the peak. Inclusion on the Sierra Peaks Section peakbagging list generates climbing interest.

== Etymology ==
This mountain's name remembers Captain Dick Barter, known as the "Hermit of Emerald Bay". Fannette Island was Captain Dick's home from 1863 to 1873, and one night while rowing back to the island the retired sailor from England perished in a storm near Rubicon Point in 1873. This landform's toponym has been officially adopted by the U.S. Board on Geographic Names.

== Climate ==
According to the Köppen climate classification system, Dicks Peak is located in an alpine climate zone. Most weather fronts originate in the Pacific Ocean, and travel east toward the Sierra Nevada mountains. As fronts approach, they are forced upward by the peaks (orographic lift), causing them to drop their moisture in the form of rain or snowfall onto the range. Precipitation runoff from the mountain ultimately drains to Lake Tahoe.

Climate data for Dicks Peak (CA) 38.8999 N, 120.1517 W, Elevation: 9,508 ft (2,898 m) (1991–2020 normals)
Month	Jan	Feb	Mar	Apr	May	Jun	Jul	Aug	Sep	Oct	Nov	Dec	Year
Mean daily maximum °F (°C)	35.1 (1.7)	34.7 (1.5)	37.6 (3.1)	40.4 (4.7)	48.4 (9.1)	58.4 (14.7)	67.3 (19.6)	66.9 (19.4)	61.1 (16.2)	51.3 (10.7)	40.8 (4.9)	34.3 (1.3)	48.0 (8.9)
Daily mean °F (°C)	26.2 (−3.2)	25.1 (−3.8)	27.5 (−2.5)	30.2 (−1.0)	37.8 (3.2)	46.8 (8.2)	55.2 (12.9)	54.9 (12.7)	49.4 (9.7)	40.3 (4.6)	31.5 (−0.3)	25.7 (−3.5)	37.6 (3.1)
Mean daily minimum °F (°C)	17.4 (−8.1)	15.6 (−9.1)	17.3 (−8.2)	19.9 (−6.7)	27.1 (−2.7)	35.2 (1.8)	43.1 (6.2)	42.8 (6.0)	37.8 (3.2)	29.4 (−1.4)	22.3 (−5.4)	17.2 (−8.2)	27.1 (−2.7)
Average precipitation inches (mm)	20.99 (533)	18.20 (462)	18.18 (462)	9.41 (239)	7.59 (193)	1.77 (45)	0.26 (6.6)	0.46 (12)	0.96 (24)	6.30 (160)	9.92 (252)	22.25 (565)	116.29 (2,953.6)
Source: PRISM Climate Group

== Gallery ==
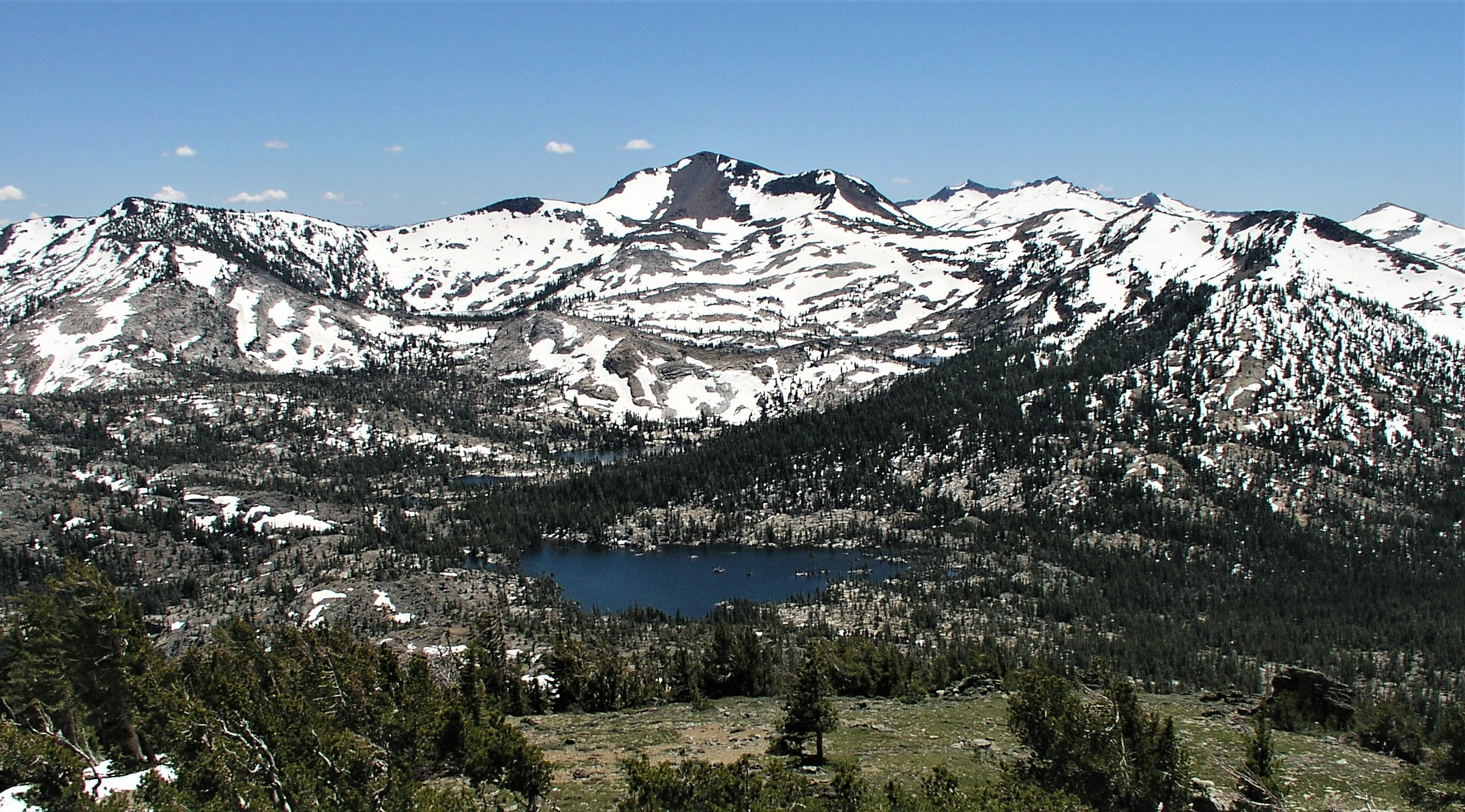
North aspect of Dicks Peak, from Phipps Peak

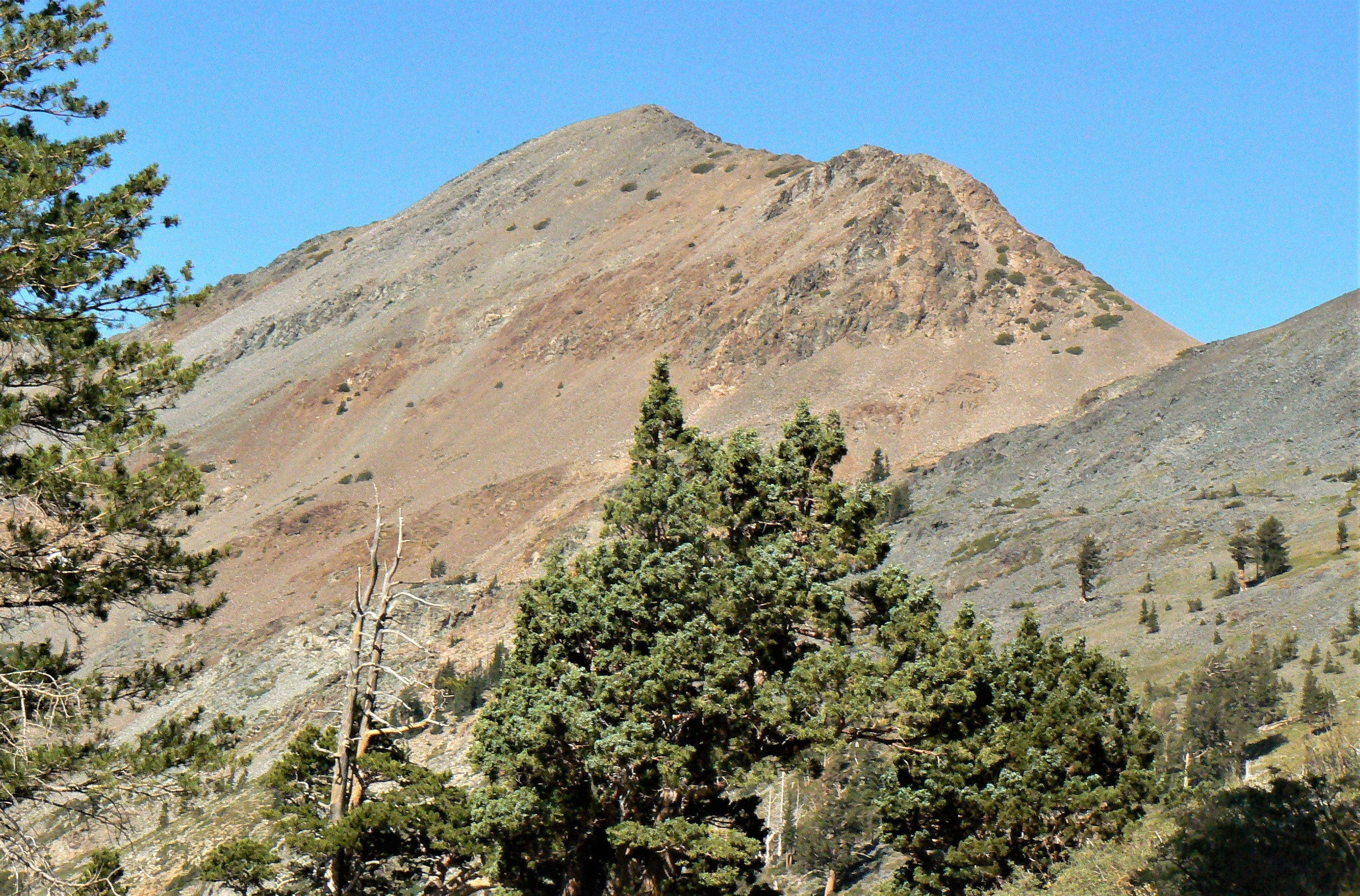
East aspect

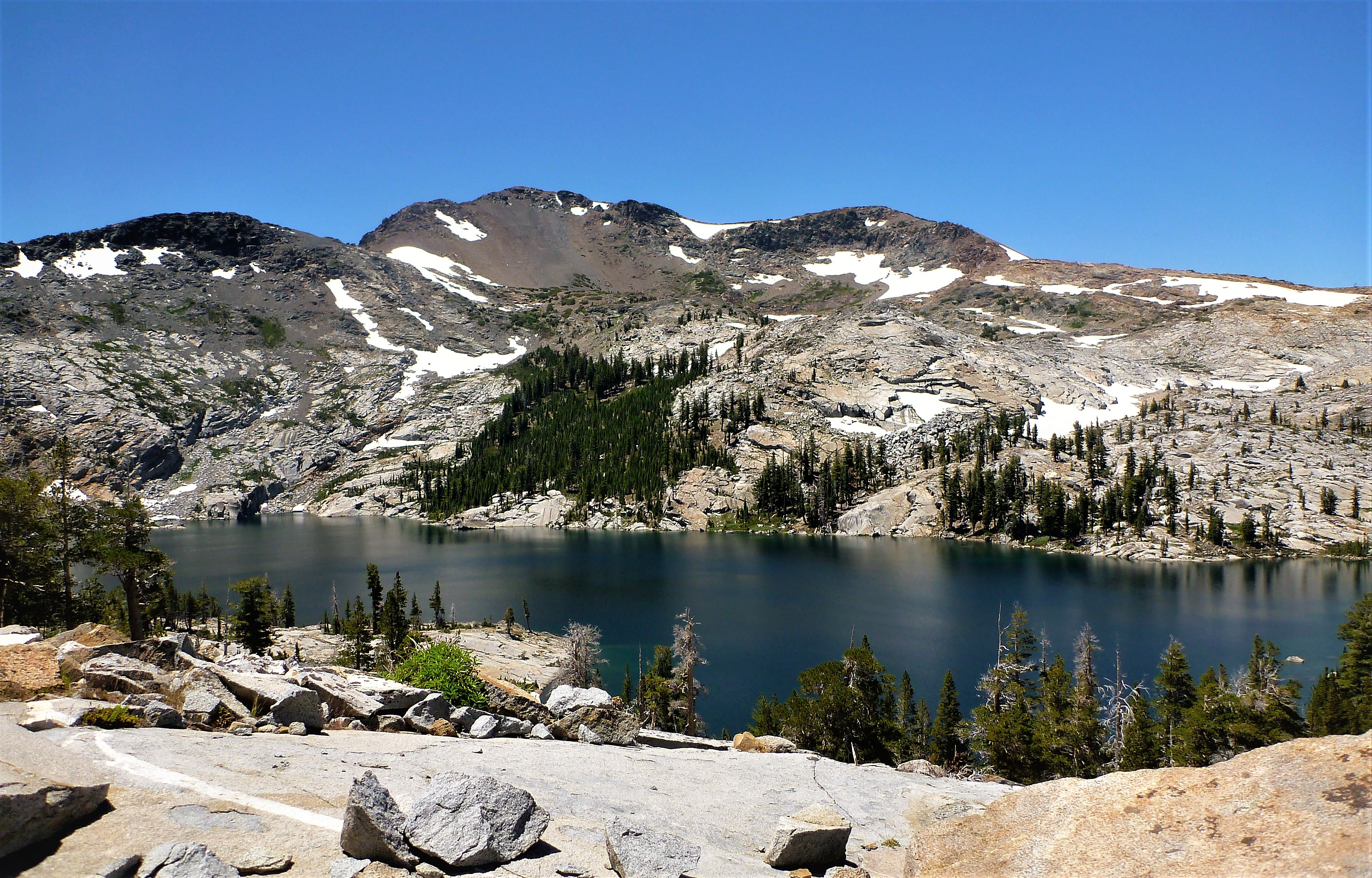
Dicks Peak and lake from northeast

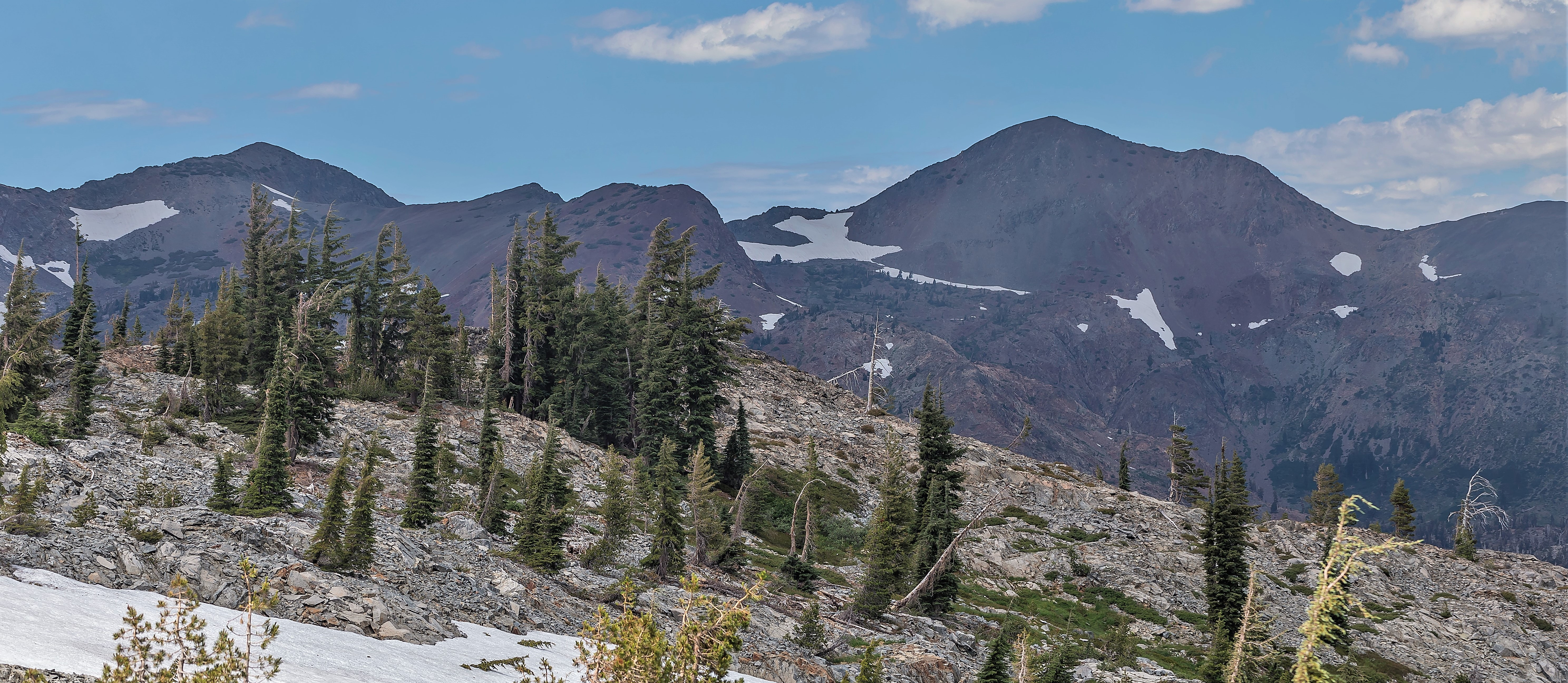
Jacks Peak (left) and Dicks Peak (right) from southeast

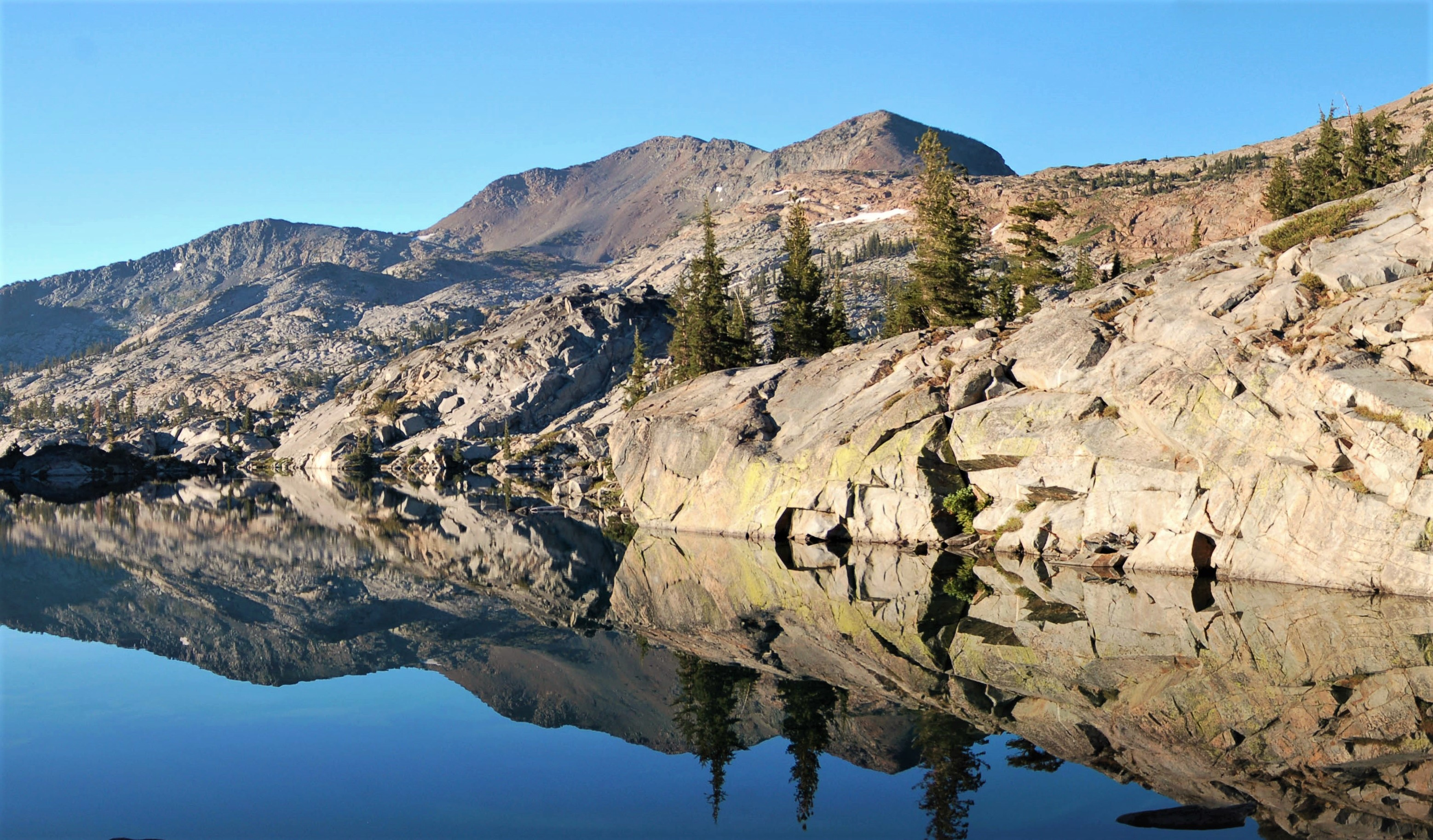
North aspect of Dicks Peak reflected in Fontanillis Lake

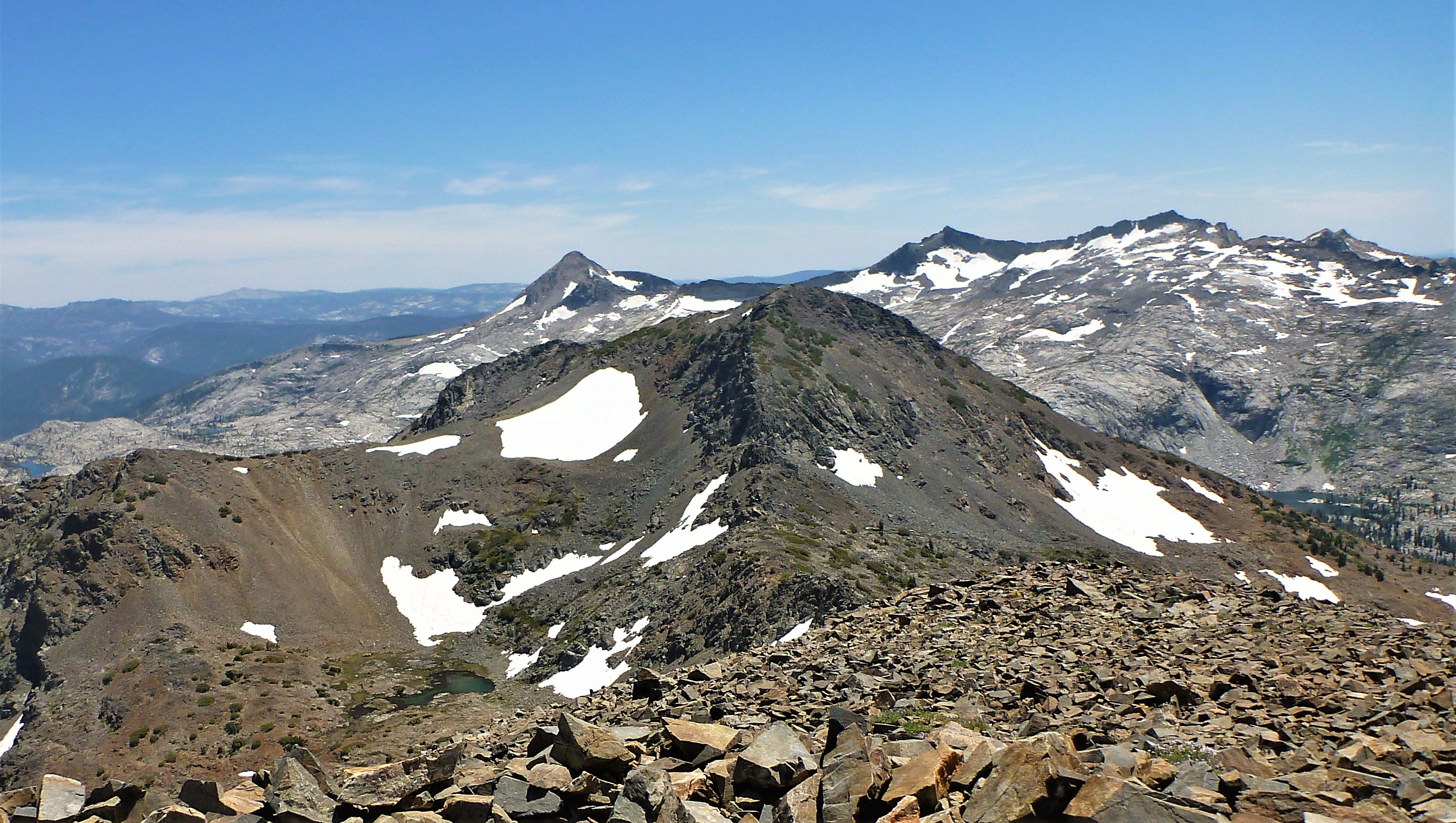
Summit view looking south at Jacks Peak, Pyramid Peak, and Mount Price

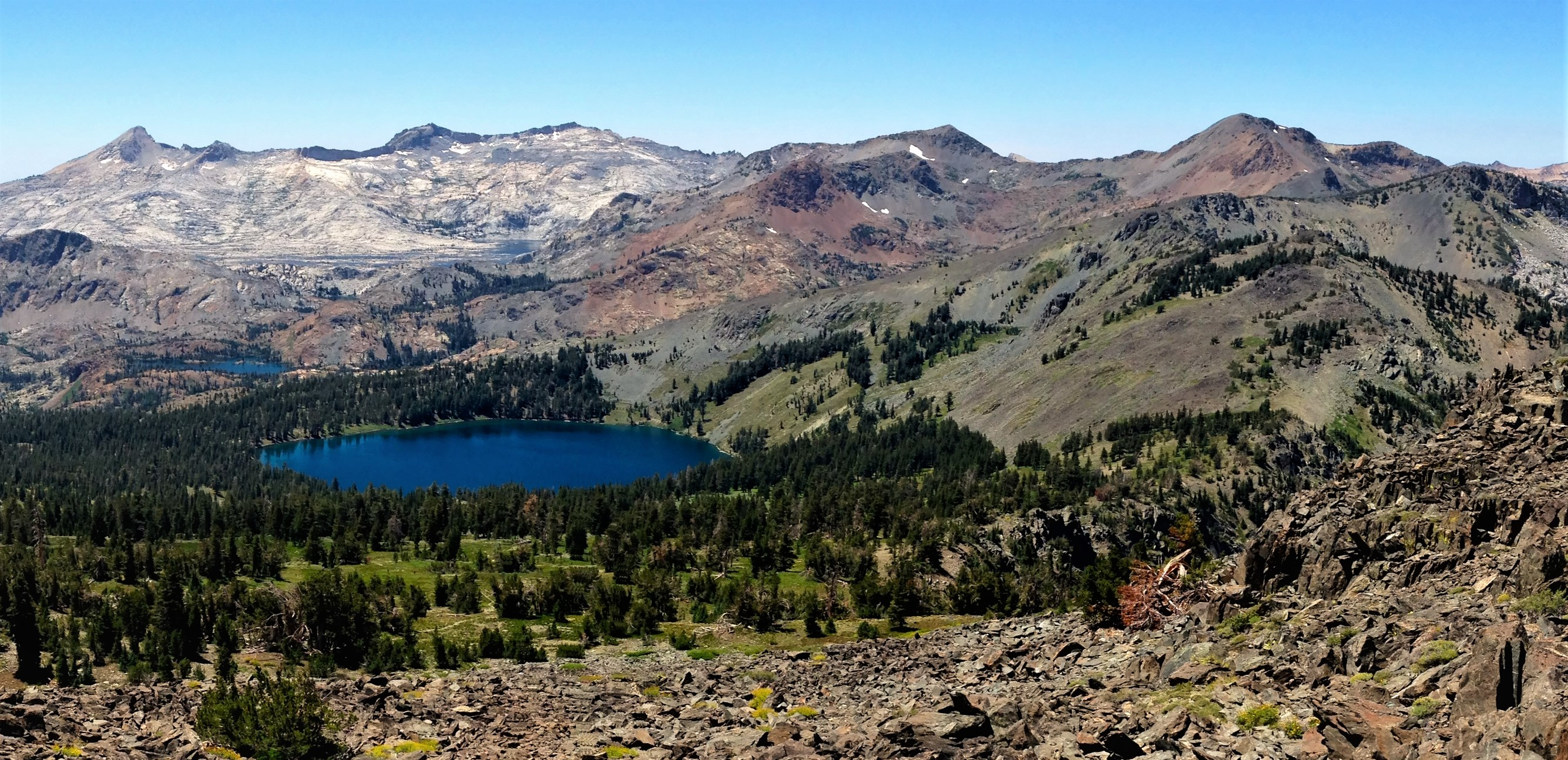
View from Mt. Tallac. Left to rightː Pyramid Peak, Mt. Price, Jacks Peak, Dicks Peak.

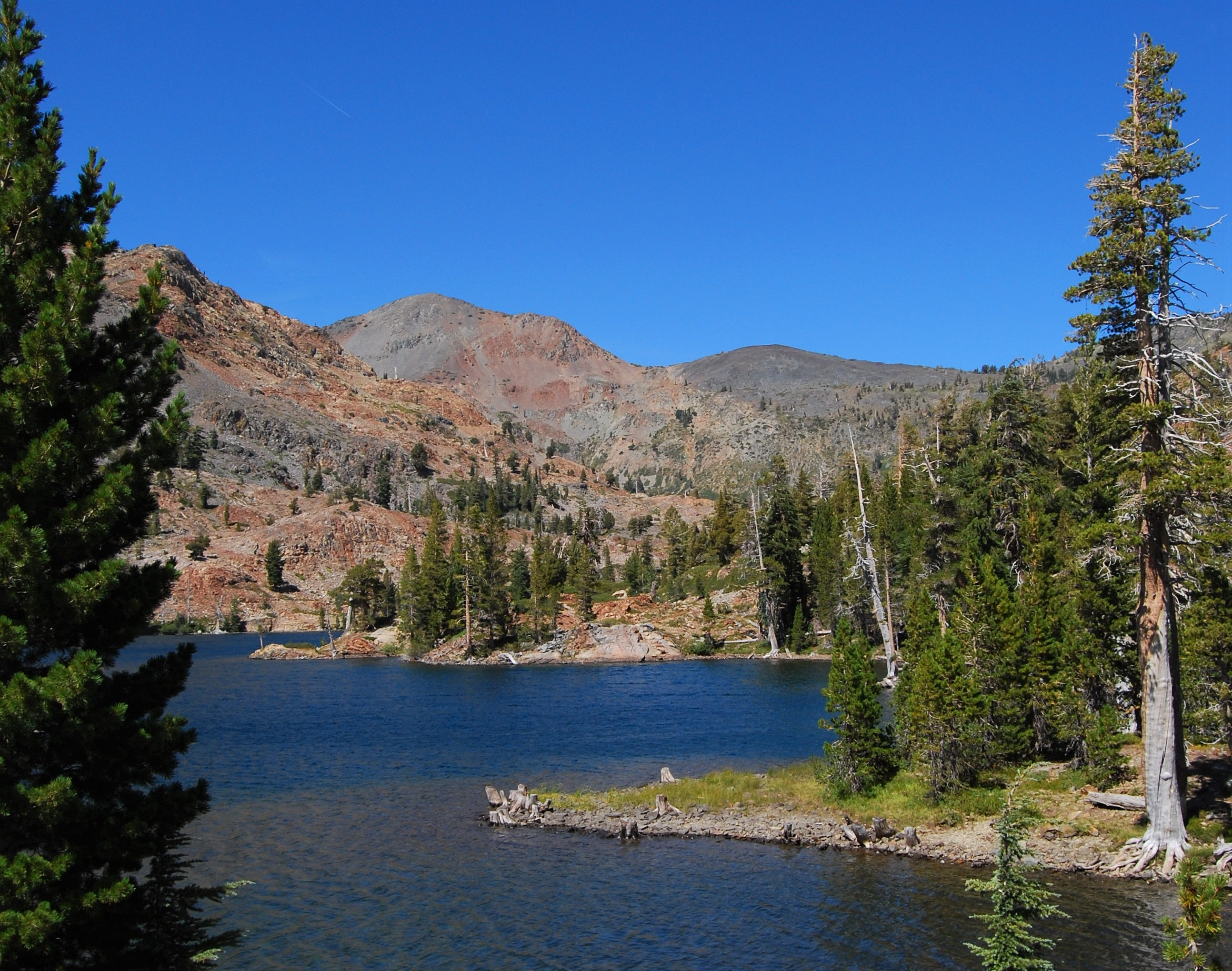
Southeast aspect of Dicks Peak seen from Susie Lake

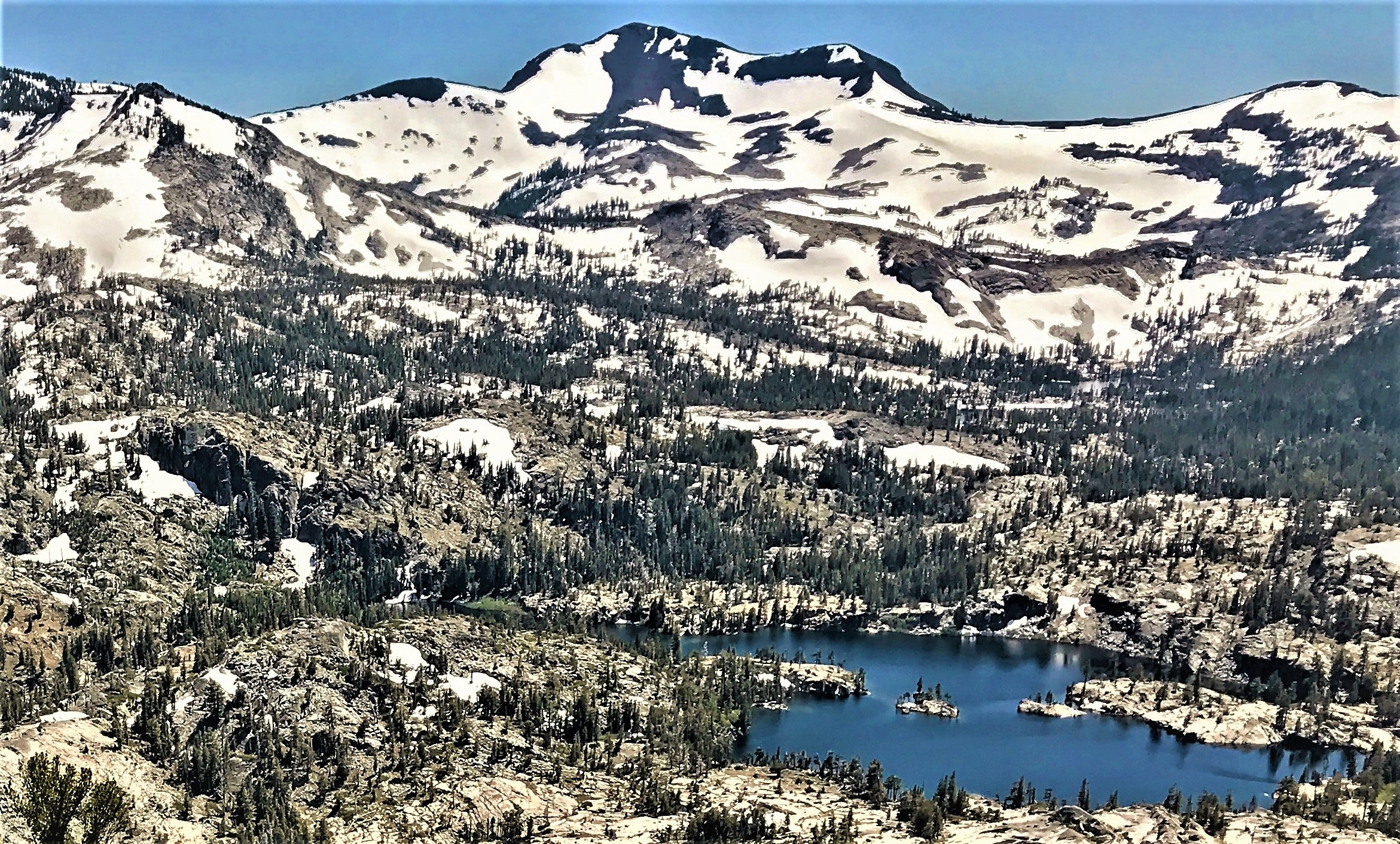
Dicks Peak and Lower Velma Lake

== See also ==
- Desolation Wilderness
