= Pyramid Lake (El Dorado County, California) =

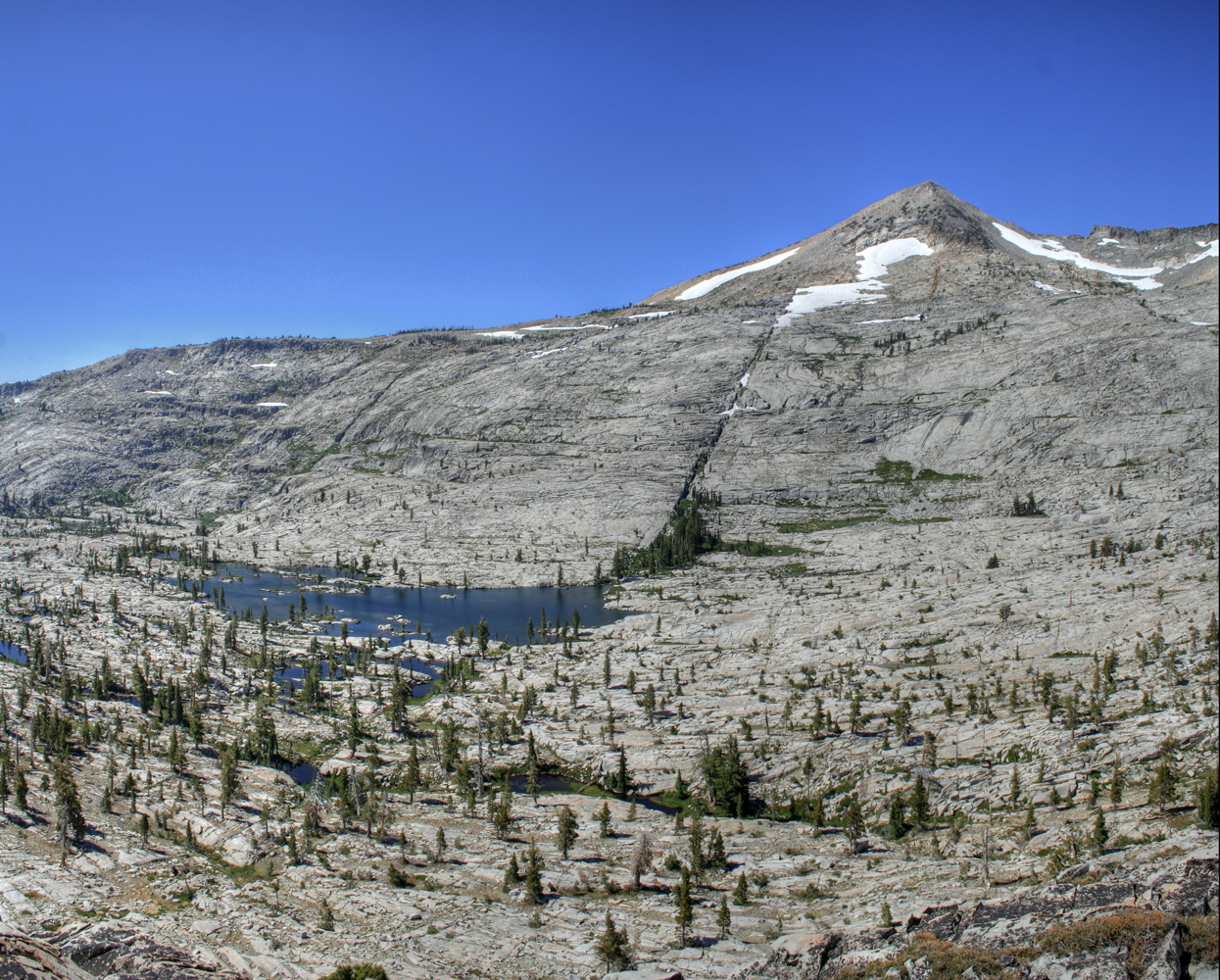
- At the base of Pyramid Peak in the Crystal Mountains

- Location within California Location within the United States
- Location: Desolation Wilderness; El Dorado County, California
- Coordinates: 38°50′53″N 120°08′28″W
- Type: Reservoir
- Basin countries: United States
- Surface elevation: 2,459 m (8,068 ft)
- References: U.S. Geological Survey Geographic Names Information System: Pyramid Lake

Pyramid Lake is a lake in the backcountry of the Desolation Wilderness in the Sierra Nevada of El Dorado County, California.

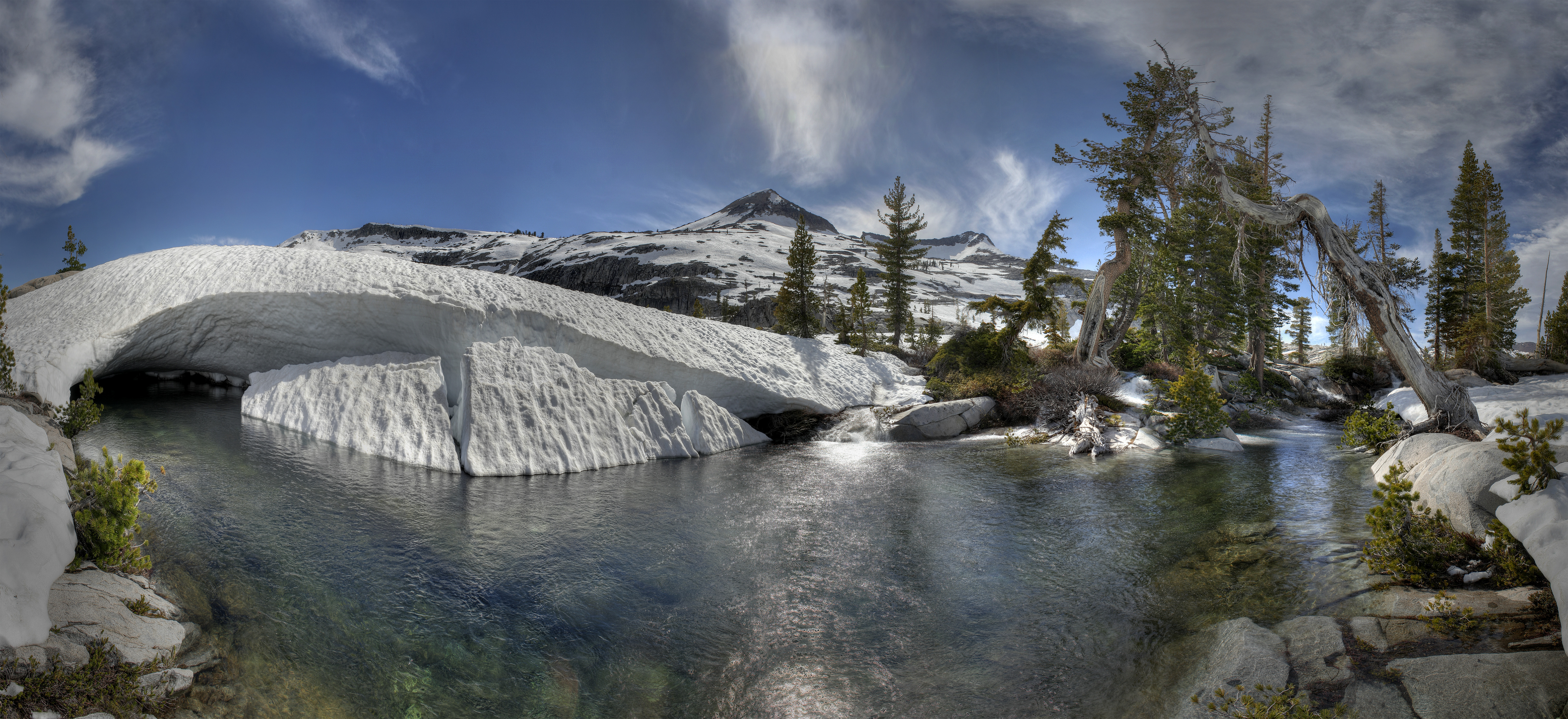
Pyramid Lake outlet pool in spring

== See also ==
- List of lakes in California
