= Lake Aloha =

Lake in the state of California, United States

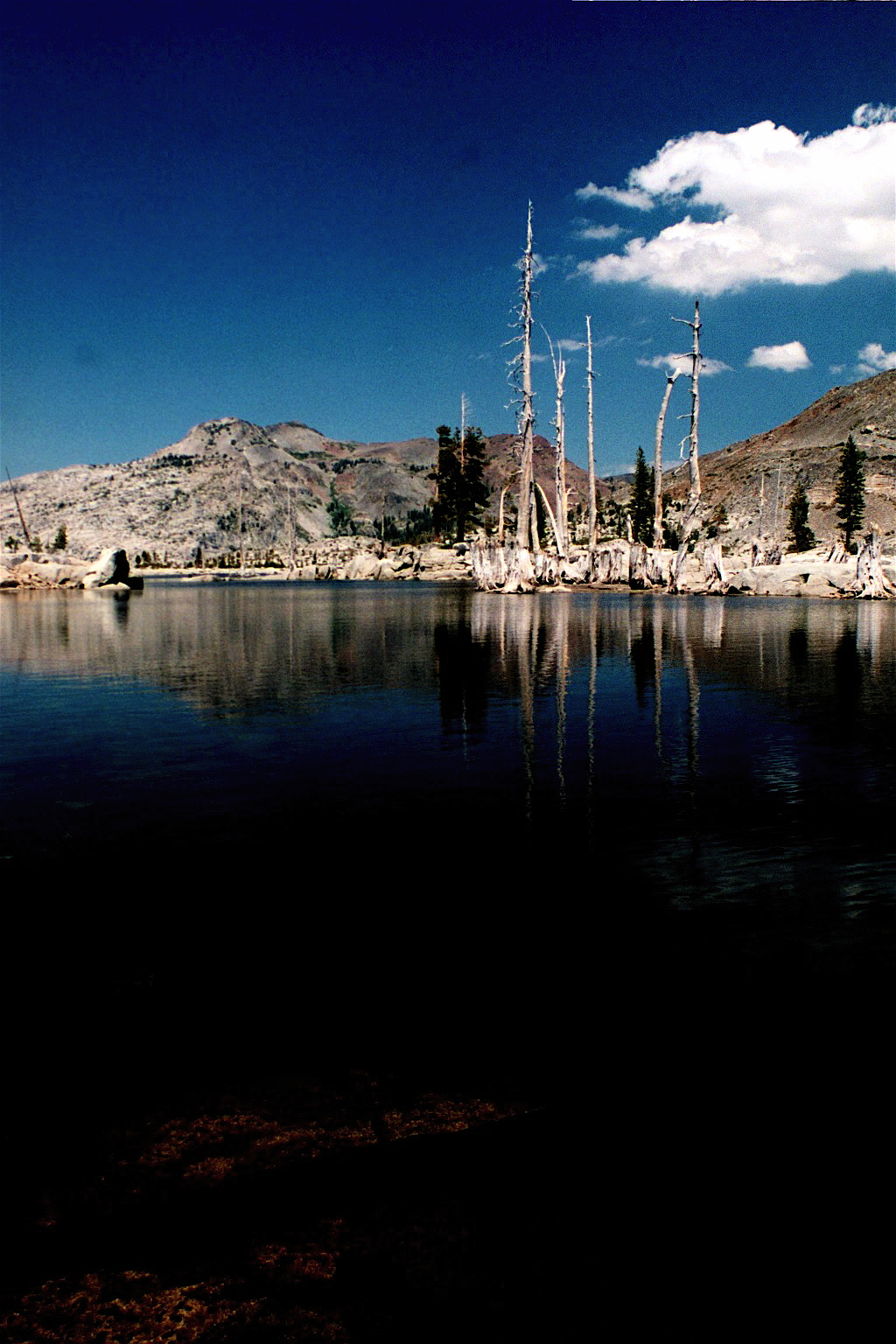
- Lake Aloha, Desolation Wilderness; general view, taken August 2008

- Location within California Location within the United States
- Location: Sierra Nevada Range; El Dorado County, California, U.S.
- Coordinates: 38°52′1.74″N 120°8′56.56″W
- Type: Reservoir
- Basin countries: United States
- Surface elevation: 8,116 ft (2,474 m)
- Settlements: South Lake Tahoe

Lake Aloha is a large shallow backcountry reservoir located at an elevation of 8,116 ft (2,474 m) in the Sierra Nevada Range, west of Lake Tahoe in El Dorado County, in eastern California.

The reservoir is located in Desolation Valley, within the federally protected Desolation Wilderness area. The shortest and easiest approach is from Echo Lake by the Pacific Crest Trail. Alternately, it can be reached by the Glen Alpine Springs Trailhead, near the city of South Lake Tahoe. There is a moderate gain in elevation as you head west. From the south, Lake Aloha can be reached by the Ralston Peak Trail or cross country through Horsetail Falls and Desolation Valley. To reach the base of Price and Pyramid Peaks, in the Crystal Range of the Sierra Nevada, you have to traverse the Lake Aloha area.

The primary outflow from Lake Aloha is Pyramid Creek, which flows south for roughly four miles before it empties into the South Fork American River near Twin Bridges.

Pyramid Creek was first dammed to create Lake Aloha in 1875, creating a year-round water source for grazing cattle and inundating a collection of natural lakes known as the Medley Lakes. The dam was later raised, and several auxiliary dams were constructed up to 1955.

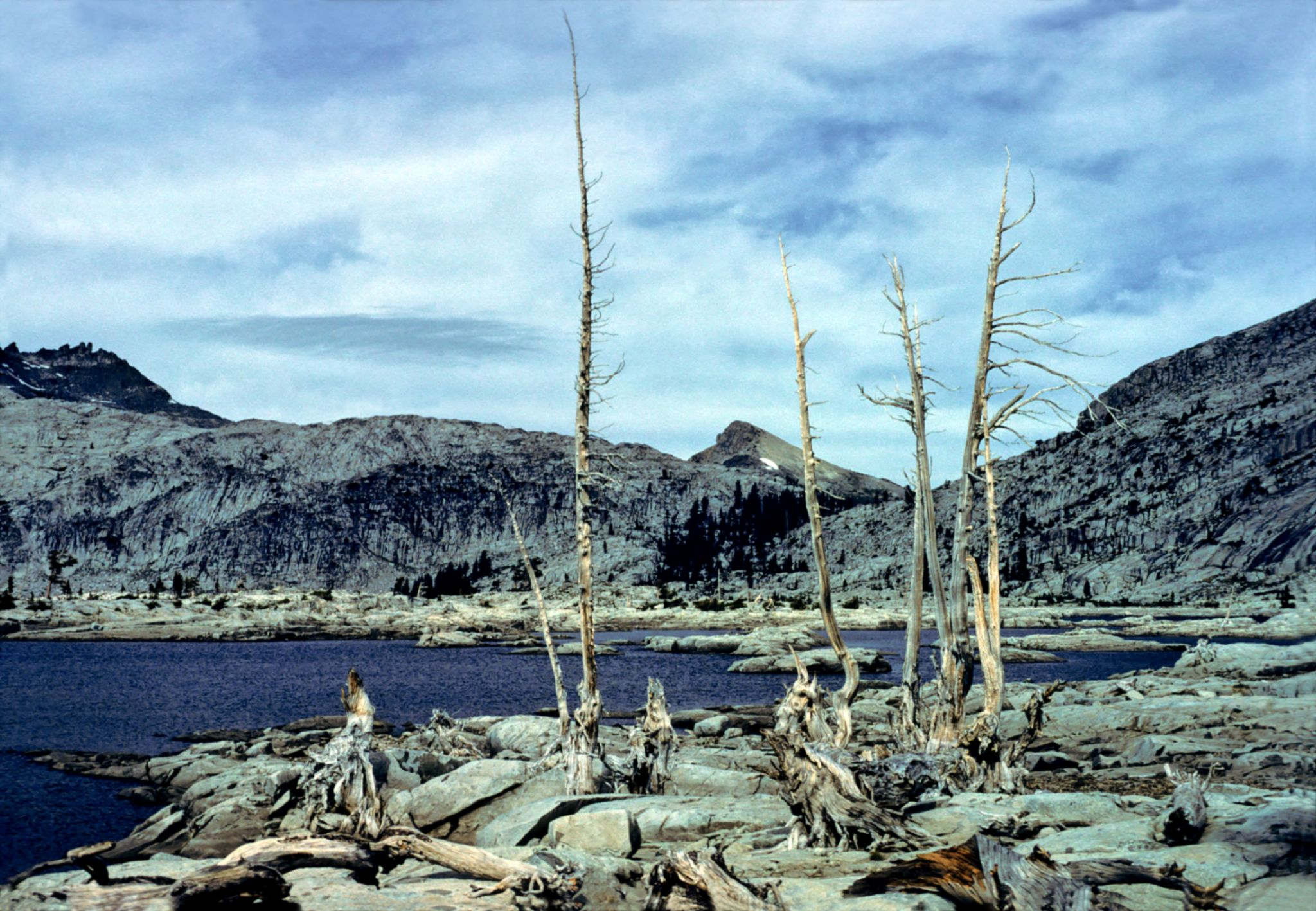
Lake Aloha in Desolation Valley, in the Desolation Wilderness Area.

== See also ==
- List of dams and reservoirs in California
- List of lakes in California
