= Aviation archaeology =

Finding, documenting, recovering, and preserving sites important in aviation history

Aviation archaeology is a recognized sub-discipline within archaeology and underwater archaeology as a whole. It is an activity practiced by both enthusiasts and academics in pursuit of finding, documenting, recovering, and preserving sites important in aviation history. For the most part, these sites are aircraft wrecks and crash sites, but also include structures and facilities related to aviation. It is also known in some circles and depending on the perspective of those involved as aircraft archaeology or aerospace archaeology and has also been described variously as crash hunting, underwater aircraft recovery, wreck chasing, or wreckology.

== History of aviation archaeology and current issues ==
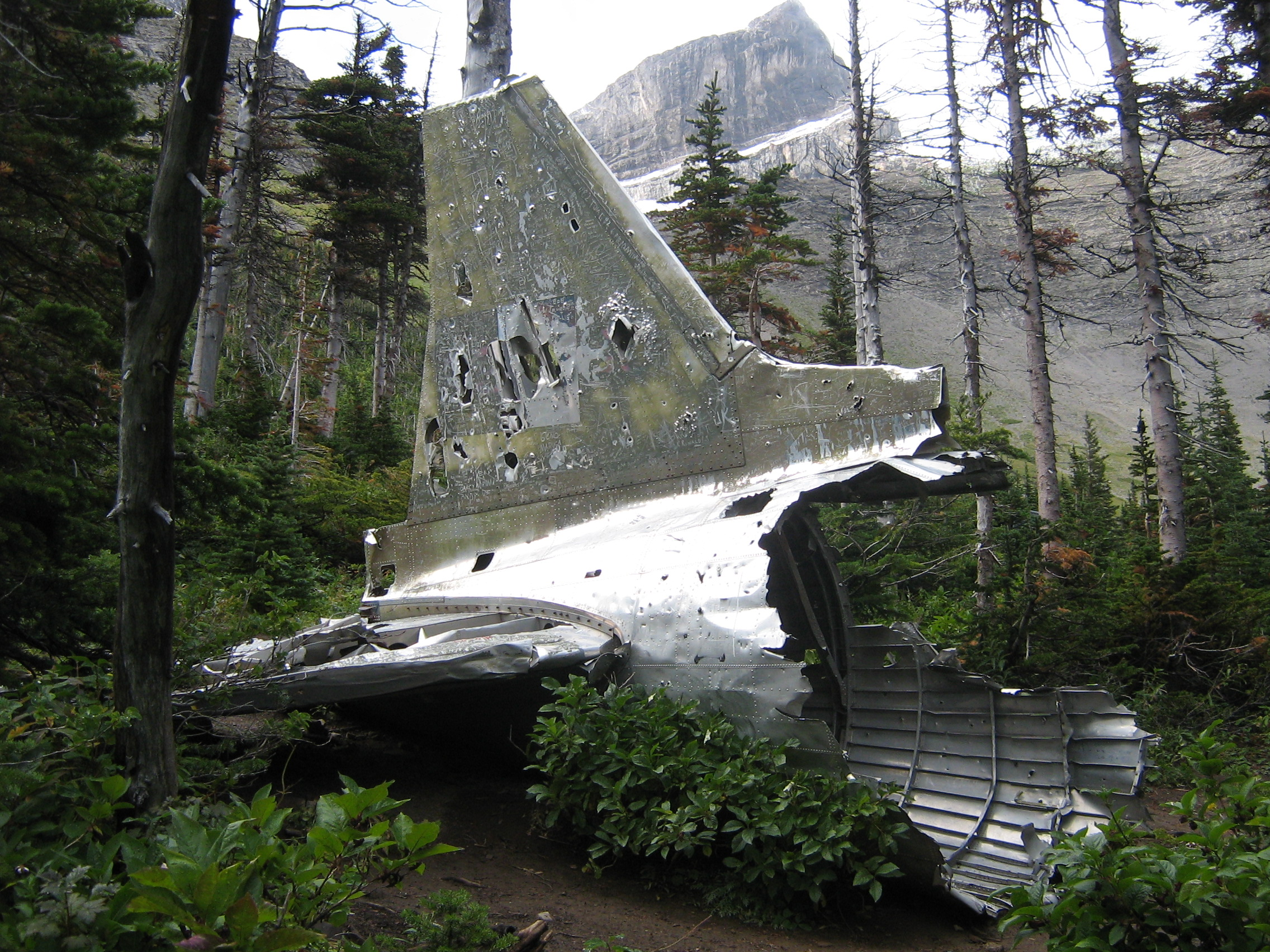
The remains of a Royal Canadian Air Force DC-3 Dakota crashed on 19 January 1946.

The activity dates to post-World War II Europe when, after the conflict, numerous aircraft wrecks studded the countryside. Many times, memorials to those involved in the crashes were put together by individuals, families, landholders, or communities.

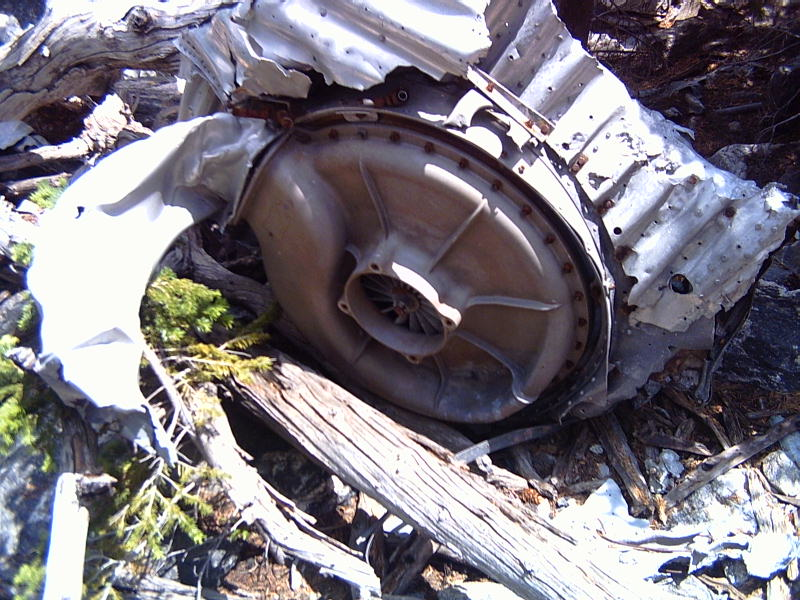
B-17 turbocharger, crash debris.

Crash sites vary in size and content; some may have fuselages, engines, and thousands of parts and debris. Other sites, like in civilian/commercial crashes, the Federal Aviation Administration and the National Transportation Safety Board (NTSB) will have almost all of the aircraft and debris removed; which makes aviation archaeology more challenging. Remains of military aircraft crash sites may also be removed by various aircraft restoration groups, particularly if the aircraft was found largely intact. In general, most recent-day (since the 1980s) aircraft crashes are removed entirely, due to environmental regulations, leaving very little to indicate the existence of a wreck.

For example, military crashes in Arizona originate from numerous air bases, past and present. Because of the warm and sunny weather, much of the U.S. Army Air Forces flight training was located in the state, both during and after WWII. Numerous air bases dotted the states – creating conditions for numerous training accidents. Old abandoned US Army Air Corp auxiliary fields and those converted to city municipal airports provide archaeological sites to be researched and investigated.

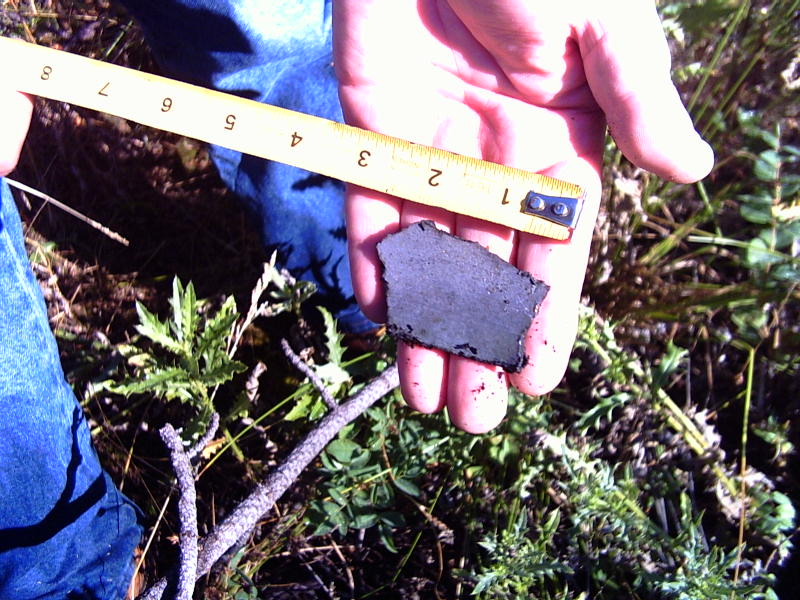
Measure, photograph and log aircraft debris.

Keeping a record of a crash site, such as photographs, maps, journals, logs, and all terrain and weather recordings are essential, e.g., the Glenwood Springs, Colorado, B-17 crash site or the Tells Peak, CA, B-17 crash site.

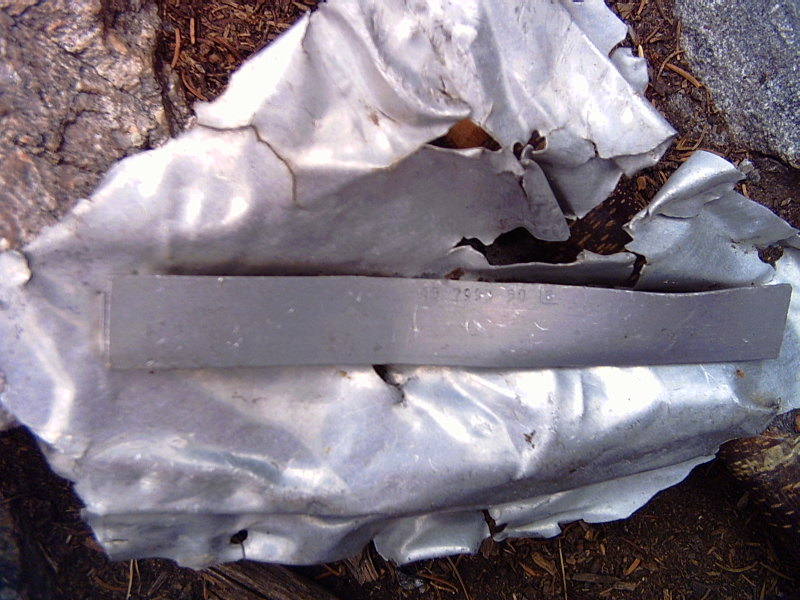
B-17 crash debris.

The internet is an ideal media for sharing, recording, educating, and promoting aviation archaeology as a hobby, as well as research projects for local and state aviation historical groups. For identifying aircraft type and manufacturer by part numbers and manufacturing inspection stamps can be analysed. From detailed GPS data & maps, to researching accident reports information, numerous resources help create a complete picture of the historic event. Accident reports, such as the official US Air Force Accident Report Form 14 becomes the foundation of archaeology research. From there, newspaper articles, county clerk records, sheriff & coroner reports, and library records all aid an aviation archaeologist in their research.

== Protection laws and regulations ==
=== United States ===
Legal protection of aircraft wreck sites is highly variable. In terms of protection by aircraft ownership, the U.S. Navy retains indefinite ownership of all Naval aircraft, including terrestrial or submerged wreck sites. The U.S. Air Force has no policies regarding disturbance of vintage aircraft wreck sites, unless human remains or weaponry remain unrecovered at the site. For vintage aircraft, including vintage military aircraft, that are usually considered abandoned when wrecked, the wreck site and all associated contents are subject to the protection laws of the land upon which it rests. The language of cultural heritage protection laws are not aviation specific, so all protection laws pertaining to aviation sites are based on interpretation. Most federal and state laws are, however, explicit in describing cultural resources as either ‘objects, sites, or otherwise, of historic value’ or ‘military or social history’ and deem the time limit as over fifty years old. If an aircraft wreck is over fifty years old, which includes all aviation wreck sites from WWII, and crashed on what is currently federal lands, the sites are automatically protected under National Park Service Law 36CFR2.1 against disturbance of any kind without a permit. Aviation sites, for example, a vintage hangar on an airport or a wreck site on the path of a proposed highway, are also immediately subject to Section 106 review if they are to be disturbed by a project that either requires a federal permit or uses federal funds. In most cases, the State Historic Preservation Officer will determine whether or not an aviation site is eligible for the register.

The National Register deems aviation wreck sites as “any aircraft that has been crashed, ditched, damaged, stranded, or abandoned”. It designates the protection terms for aviation history sites as well, including abandoned airfields or facilities sites, testing or experimental sites, land or water air terminals, or airway beacons and navigational aids.

State lands protection laws vary widely across the nation but the language describing a historical resource is the same as federal laws. Therefore, aviation properties and aircraft wrecks on State lands can be protected under various environmental, public resource, and historical property laws as outlined per state for the protection of archaeological and historic resources. Any archaeological survey, excavation, or activity that disturbs wither wreck or aviation property remains can, in some cases, be permitted on federal and state lands under a permitting process through the regulating entity. If an aircraft wreck, or the remains of any aviation property, is located on private land it is not automatically protected by any federal, state, or local law and any survey or excavation work must be permitted by the land owner.

Under the 'Sunken Military Craft Act’ (SMCA) of 2004, it is illegal to disturb, remove, or injure the wreck sites or associated contents of U.S. Naval or any submerged military aircraft. The act identifies military craft as including any sunken military aircraft or military spacecraft that was owned or operated by a government when it sank, and includes the associated contents. Because of the U.S. Navy's retaining of ownership of all military craft, the act applies to any U.S. Navy aircraft, even if in international or other country's territorial waters. The act also applies to any foreign military craft in U.S. territorial waters. Persons wishing to conduct archaeological or research exploration of any submerged military aircraft can apply to the Naval History and Heritage Command’s Underwater Archaeology Branch for a permit. The U.S. Marine Corps and U.S. Coast Guard has similar policies and permitting requirements to the Navy. The SMCA includes penalties associated with any unauthorized disturbances of sunken military craft as a fine and a liability for the reasonable costs incurred in recovery of archaeological or cultural information, storage, restoration, care, maintenance, and conservation.

As a part of federal air regulations, NTSB Part 830, protects any aircraft whose accident cause is under investigation. NTSB officials will routinely seize portions of wrecked aircraft for further analysis. Most of the time, after their study is complete, the sequestered debris is returned to the owners' representation – most often the aircraft's insurance company. However, examples like the reconstructed wreckage of TWA Flight 800 are held in perpetuity by the NTSB to educate the public and future investigators on the NTSB's role in transportation safety.

=== United Kingdom ===
The laws in the UK cover the remains of all aircraft which have crashed during military service (land or sea) are protected by the Protection of Military Remains Act 1986. This Act defines an offence of tampering with, damage to, moving, or unearthing the aircraft remains. Exceptions apply to those holding licences, which can be issued by the Secretary of State, authorising specific procedures to be performed.

For the wreck-chasing hobbyist there is a self-regulating body, the British Aviation Archaeological Council (BAAC), which defines ethical standards of behaviour, coordinates activities and provides a forum for discussion for its member groups. Not all active groups in the UK are members of this organisation.

== Types of aviation archaeology sites ==
=== Terrestrial sites ===
Aviation history sites on land that can be subject to archaeological survey or excavation can include airports (which can contain hangars, terminal, other facilities, etc.), crash sites, monuments, or even properties associated with important persons or events in aviation history. Some examples of potential and current archaeological sites:

==== Aircraft crash sites ====
The Loon Lake B-23 Dragon crash site in Payette National Forest, Idaho is a remarkably intact example of an aircraft wreck. The crew survived and was rescued, and some avionics removed from the site, and it currently is the subject of a teaching aviation archaeology field school in various years.

==== Abandoned airfields ====
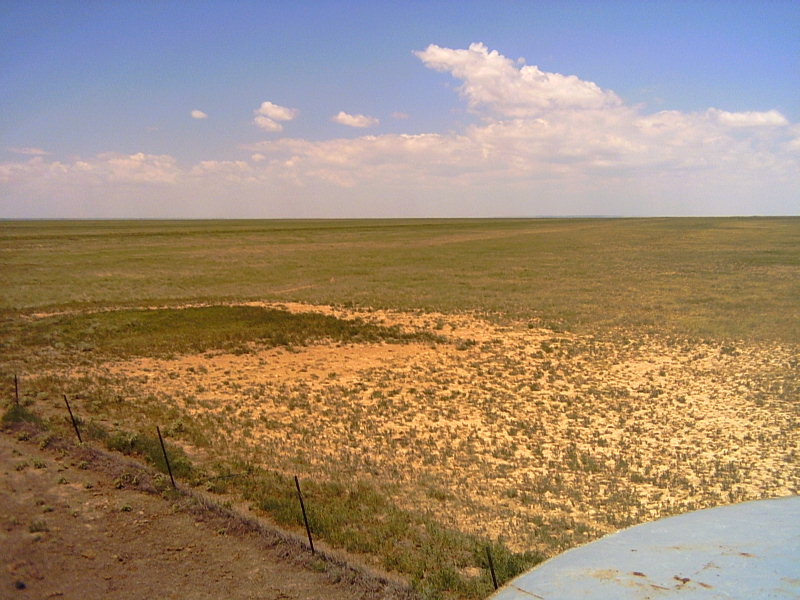
Arlington Auxiliary Army Airfield: high view from the SW corner of the triangular runway looking WNW, Arlington, CO, 2006

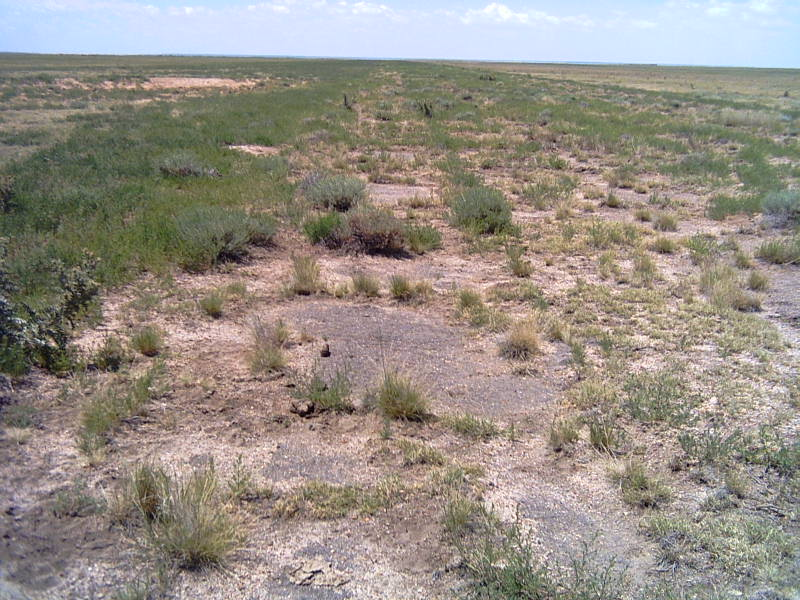
Arlington Airfield: E/W runway looking west. Notice the large sections of asphalt and the vegetation changes along and on the runway, 2006

Abandoned airfields can yield much information of historic information about aviation and related industries. From civilian airfields to military airfields, aviation archaeologists can find, uncover, and recover a variety of artifacts, just to name a few: aircraft parts with serial numbers, equipment parts, asphalt or runway material, variety of contamination, structures and foundations, businesses and economics, to community and cultural changes. With the closure of a military airbase, the street system and runways become local expansion of city streets and business; one example is the community conversion of Lowry Air Force Base to a local residential, commercial, and educational environment. Other bases, like the Arlington Auxiliary Army Airfield reverted to farming and ranching.

In 1990, 1994, and 1998, archaeologists investigated, using airborne remote sensing studies and limited excavation, a vintage hangar of the Huffman Prairie Flying Field Site at Wright-Patterson Air Force Base, Ohio. The investigations were “designed to provide information needed for site management by Wright-Patterson Air Force Base and the Dayton Aviation Heritage National Historical Park of the National Park Service. The geophysical and remote sensing investigations revealed magnetic, electromagnetic, and ground penetrating radar anomalies and infrared thermal images associated with the hangar structure. The archaeological excavations located an in situ wood post, posthole features, and artifacts which represent archaeological remains of the actual hangar”. Huffman Prairie Flying Field is listed on the National Register of Historic Places.

Another example is Hamilton Army Airfield in Novato, California. It was in use from 1929 until 1976. It was eventually turned over to the city of Novato for development of housing. The runway is also part of tidal wetland restoration effort currently underway by the U.S. Army Corps of Engineers, California Coastal Conservancy, and the San Francisco Bay Conservation and Development Commission.

==== Abandoned missile silos and sites ====
California has missile launch sites abandoned by the US Army. Archaeological research includes these sites throughout the United States. Exploring and hiking around abandoned silos and sites may constitute trespassing as well as being dangerous. Permission from current land owners or caretakers is imperative. Research and formal site investigations adds to the historical record of the Cold War. One such site is the Minuteman Missile National Historic Site.

In the Golden Gate National Recreation Area is a decommissioned Cold War era Nike Missile base, Nike Missile Site SF-88. In 1954, it was armed with Nike Ajax missiles. In 1958, it was converted to Nike Hercules nuclear missiles. After it was shut down in 1974, it was turned over to the National Park Service, and it open for to the public regularly.

=== Underwater crash sites ===
A B-29 "Superfortress" Serial No. 45-21847 ditched in Lake Mead in 1949. This particular aircraft is listed in the National Register under Criterion C as an example of a significant type of aircraft construction and under Criterion D for it potential to yield important information.

The remains of the USS Macon Airship and its associated F9C Sparrowhawks are located at around 1500 feet in the Monterey Bay National Marine Sanctuary. The National Oceanic and Atmospheric Administration (NOAA) has run survey expeditions to the site, creating photomosaics to track deterioration. The wreck site is listed on the National Register.

== Underwater surveying and recovery ==
Underwater search and recovery is a complex aspect of aviation archaeology. Dive and recovery team have to do extensive research and planning before any recovery is performed. The aircraft site may be left as a memorial and not recovered. Once an aircraft has been located, an underwater survey is conducted before recovery operations begin. Many tasks are established and the research is a long process that requires the detailed review numerous and various sources of information. The complexities include a great deal of preparation, extensive training, precise planning, and very technical equipment and coordination. Conservation has often proved very difficult

=== Australia ===
The Australian focus has been on underwater aviation archaeology, partly as a result of the interest of the relatively large number of maritime archaeologists and shipwreck conservators in the field. This has resulted in numerous studies and reports, including some cross-fertilization or ideas, theory and techniques with practitioners in other parts of the world, with a strong emphasis on the involvement of conservators. Underwater aviation archaeology commenced in Australia at the wrecks of the Dornier, Catalina, and Sunderland Flying Boats destroyed by Japanese fighters at Broome in WWII. These lie, both in the intertidal zone, and in deeper water. The study continued in Darwin in the Northern Territory with research and fieldwork at its series of submerged PBY Catalina wrecks, Subsequently, the study has spread to other regions in Australia, partly as a result of the Interest of Flinders University and its postgraduate student body. While military aircraft remain the property of their respective governments unless delegated to a third party, submerged aircraft wrecks (such as the wrecks at Broome in Western Australia), have proven to be quite difficult to protect from unauthorized recoveries and looting. Those in Broome are now protected under the provisions of the 1990 Heritage of Western Australia Act.

== As a profession ==
In America, aviation archaeologists, crosstrained in other areas of study, are found in the employ of Joint POW/MIA Accounting Command (JPAC), traveling to former war zones throughout the world, to search for the remains of American servicemen and women that have been lost. Many of these losses involve aircraft mishaps in remote and difficult to reach areas. A group of volunteers, under the banner of "The BentProp Project", have pursued American military wreck sites and remains without disturbing them; their findings are forwarded to JPAC. In Australia and in some other parts of the world, where there are human remains involved, a tendency has been for the armed forces to secure the services of forensic anthropologists and crash investigators.

Professional aviation archaeologists may also be involved in the recovery of near-complete examples of wrecked or abandoned aircraft for profit. The clients of these professionals range from private individuals and aviation museums, to government agencies. Often these aircraft are in remote areas, which aids wreckage preservation. Examples include Glacier Girl, a Lockheed P-38 Lightning that was successfully recovered from below the Greenland ice cap, and restored to airworthy condition, and Kee Bird, a Boeing B-29 Superfortress also abandoned on the Greenland ice cap, but severely damaged by recovery efforts.

== See also ==
- Aerial archaeology
- Aviation accidents and incidents
- Aviation safety
- Crash cover
- Industrial archaeology
- List of aviation historical societies
- Protection of Military Remains Act 1986
- Wreck diving
