= Pyramid Lake =

Pyramid Lake may refer to:

- Pyramid Lake (Alberta), Canada
- Pyramid Lake (Los Angeles County, California)
- Pyramid Lake (El Dorado County, California)
- Pyramid Lake (Nevada)

== See also ==
- Pyramid Lake Paiute Tribe Reservation, Nevada
- Pyramid Lake War
