= Tells Peak =

Mountain in California, United States

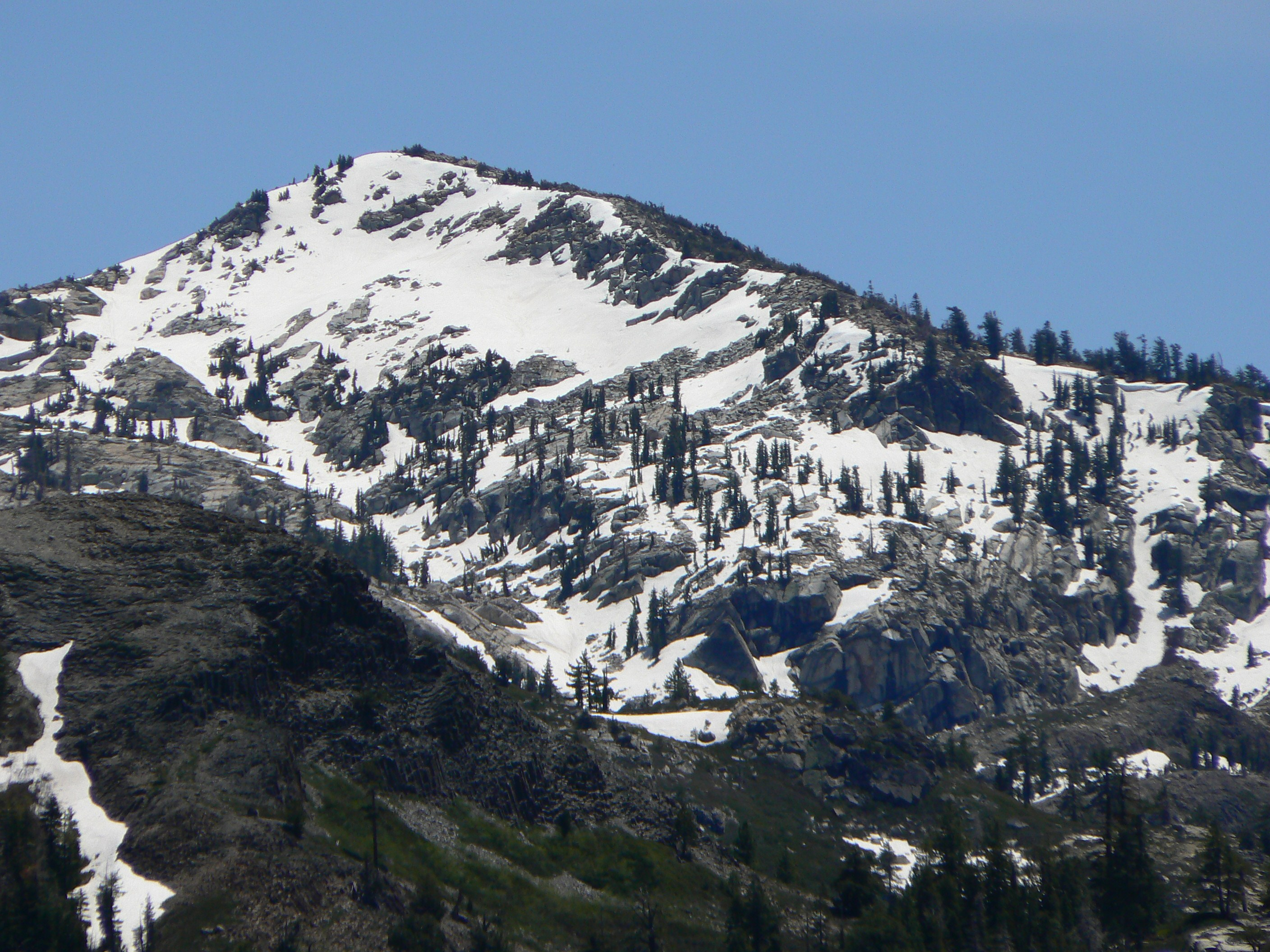

Highest point
- Elevation: 8,876 ft (2,705 m) NAVD 88
- Prominence: 232 ft (71 m)
- Parent peak: McConnell Peak
- Listing: Tahoe OGUL Mountaineer Peak
- Coordinates: 38°57′35″N 120°15′16″W

Geography
- Location within California
- Location: El Dorado County, California, U.S.
- Parent range: Sierra Nevada
- Topo map: USGS Loon Lake

Climbing
- Easiest route: Scramble, class 2

Tells Peak is a mountain in the Sierra Nevada at the very north end of the Crystal Range (California), to the west of Lake Tahoe. It is located in the Desolation Wilderness in El Dorado County, California.

The origin of the name is not certain. It is probably named for a Swiss homesteader named Tell who lived a few miles to the west. At least one historian believes it was named for Ciperano Pedrini, a storekeeper in Garden Valley, who was known as Bill Tell.
