= Mount Price (California) =

Mountain in United States of America

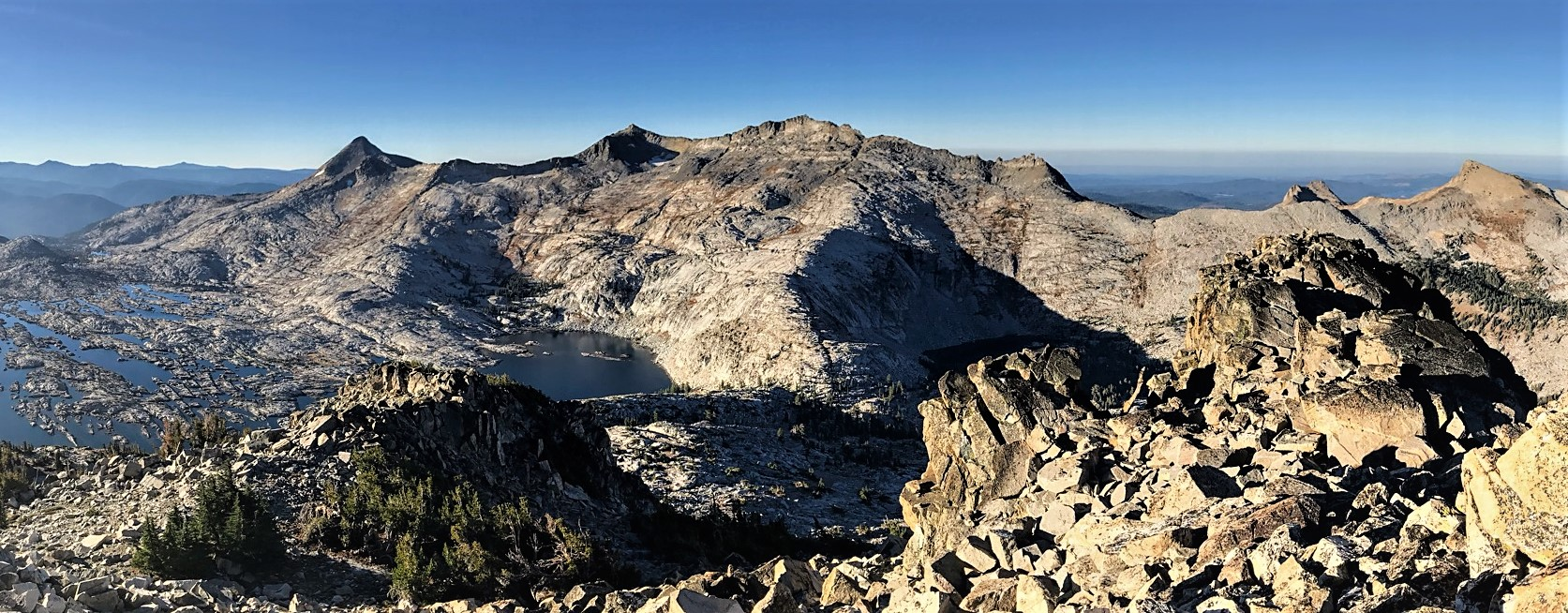
- Mount Price from the northeast

Highest point
- Elevation: 9,979 ft (3,042 m) NAVD 88
- Prominence: 535 ft (163 m)
- Listing: Tahoe OGUL Emblem Peak
- Coordinates: 38°51′50″N 120°10′29″W

Geography
- Location within California Location within the United States
- Location: El Dorado County, California, U.S.
- Parent range: Crystal Range
- Topo map: USGS Pyramid Peak

Climbing
- Easiest route: Simple Scramble, class 2

Mount Price is a mountain in the Sierra Nevada at the southern end of the Crystal Range, and southwest of Lake Tahoe. The summit is located in the Desolation Wilderness and the El Dorado County, California.
