= Ralston Peak =

Mountain in the American state of California

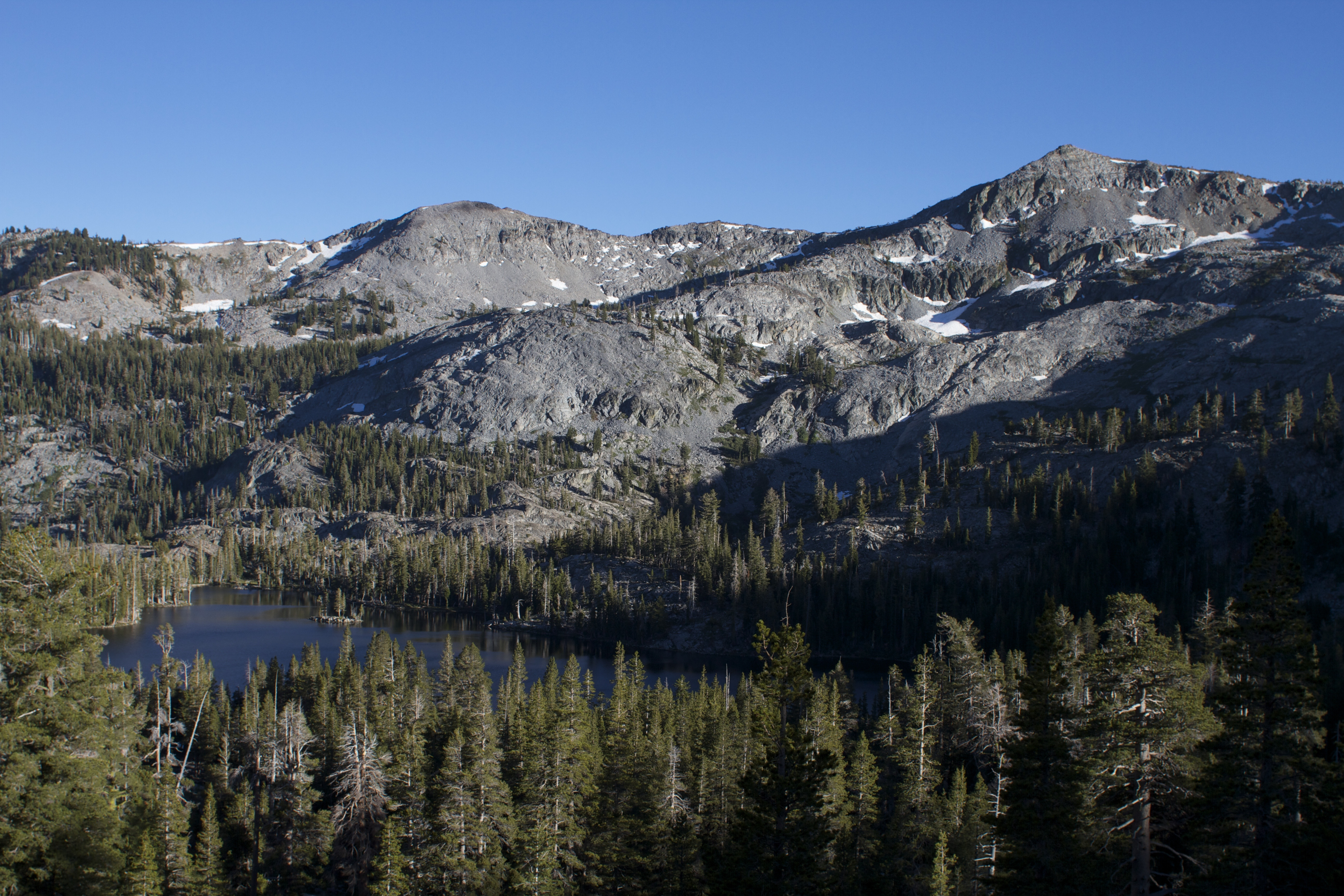

Highest point
- Elevation: 9,239 ft (2,816 m) NAVD 88
- Prominence: 1,075 ft (328 m)
- Listing: Tahoe OGUL Mountaineer Peak
- Coordinates: 38°49′59″N 120°06′06″W

Geography
- Location within California Location within the United States
- Location: El Dorado County, California, U.S.
- Parent range: Sierra Nevada
- Topo map: USGS Echo Lake

Climbing
- Easiest route: Hike, class 1

Ralston Peak is a mountain in the Sierra Nevada mountain range to the west of Lake Tahoe within the Desolation Wilderness in El Dorado County, California. Ralston Peak is a very popular mountain to summit for the views of the wilderness area as it lies very near U.S. Route 50. The closest trailhead to the summit can be found in Camp Sacramento a few miles west of Echo Summit. Ralston Peak can also be accessed from the Pacific Crest Trail between Echo Lake and Lake Aloha. Starting at the nearest trailhead (Echo Lake), this route is significantly longer than the trail from Camp Sacramento. But the altitude gain on this route is much less, and the trail is much less steep.

== Climate ==
According to the Köppen climate classification system, Ralston Peak is located in an alpine climate zone. Most weather fronts originate in the Pacific Ocean and travel east toward the Sierra Nevada mountains. As fronts approach, they are forced upward by the peaks (orographic lift), causing them to drop their moisture in the form of rain or snowfall onto the range.

== Gallery ==
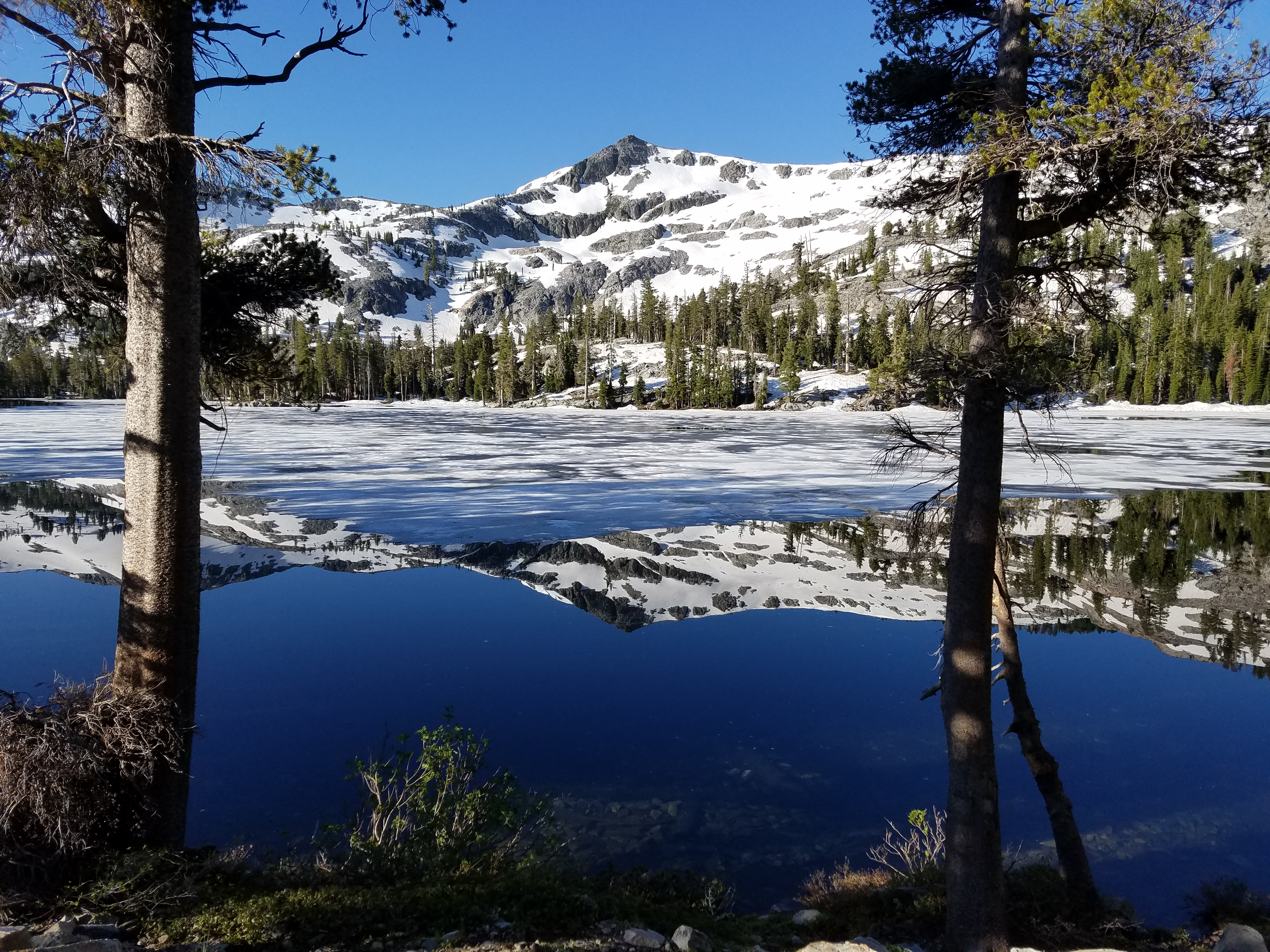
Tamarack Lake with Ralston Peak in background

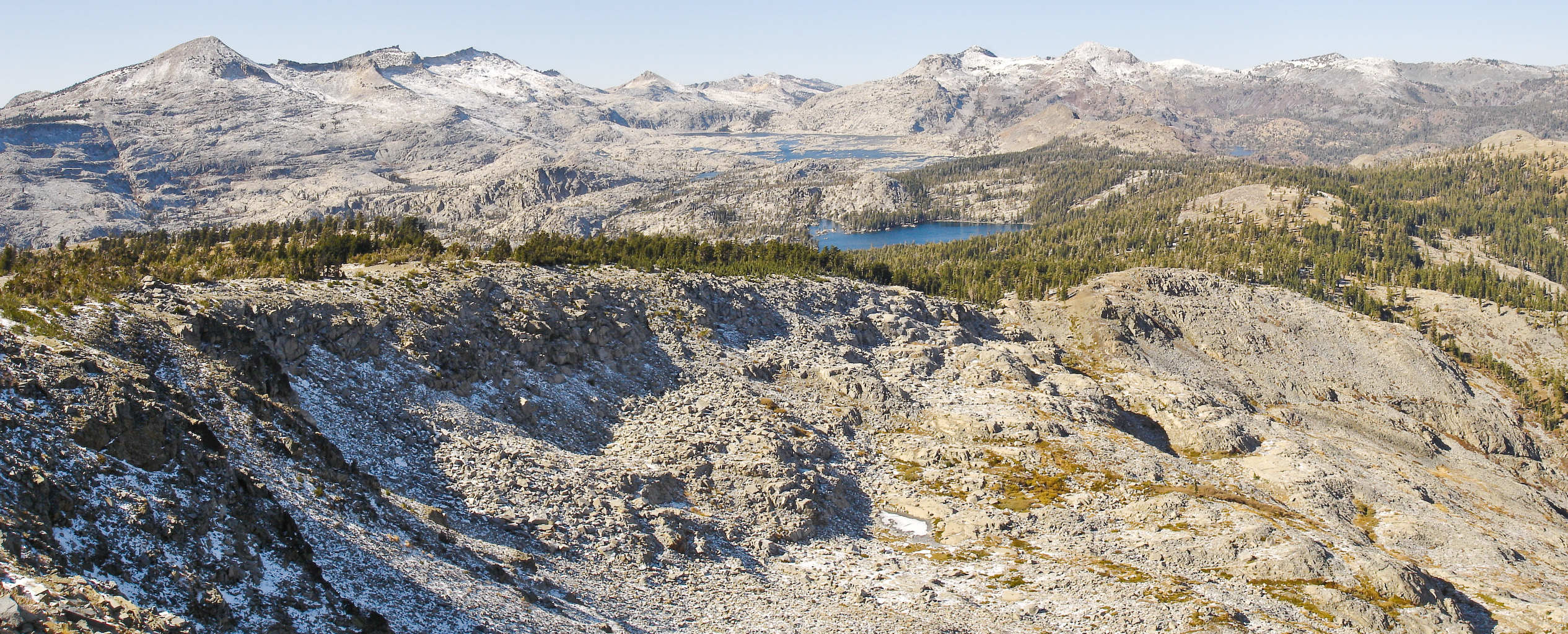
View of Lake Aloha from Ralston Peak
