= Wrights Lake =

Lake in the state of California, United States

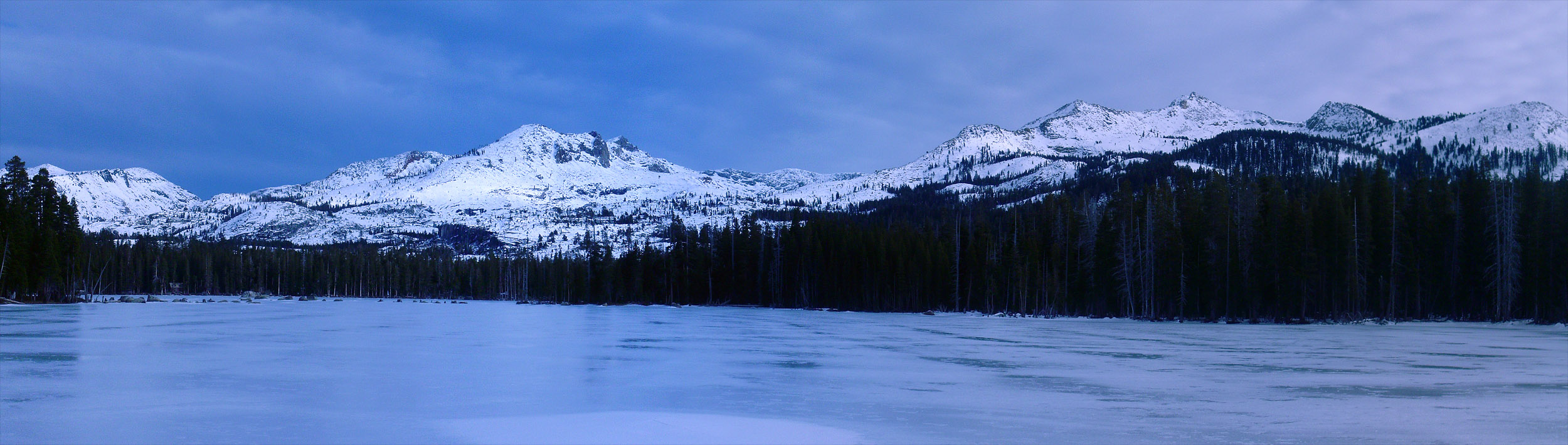

- Location within California Location within the United States
- Location: El Dorado County, California, United States
- Coordinates: 38°51′N 120°14′W
- Basin countries: United States
- Average depth: 5 ft (1.5 m)
- Max. depth: 8 ft (2.4 m)
- Residence time: 90+ years
- Surface elevation: over 6,900 ft (2,100 m)
- Islands: None

Wrights Lake is in the Sierra Nevada mountain range, west of Lake Tahoe on the western border of the Desolation Wilderness. It can be reached via Wrights Road off U.S. Route 50 and the Ice House Road. It provides hiking access to the western portions of the Desolation Wilderness via the Twin Lakes trailhead. Wrights Road is not plowed and is inaccessible during the winter. Wrights Lake is the starting point for the Barrett Lake Jeep Trail.

== See also ==
- List of lakes in California
