= Glen Alpine Springs trailhead =

Trail in El Dorado County, California

Coordinates: 38.87711°N 120.08042°W

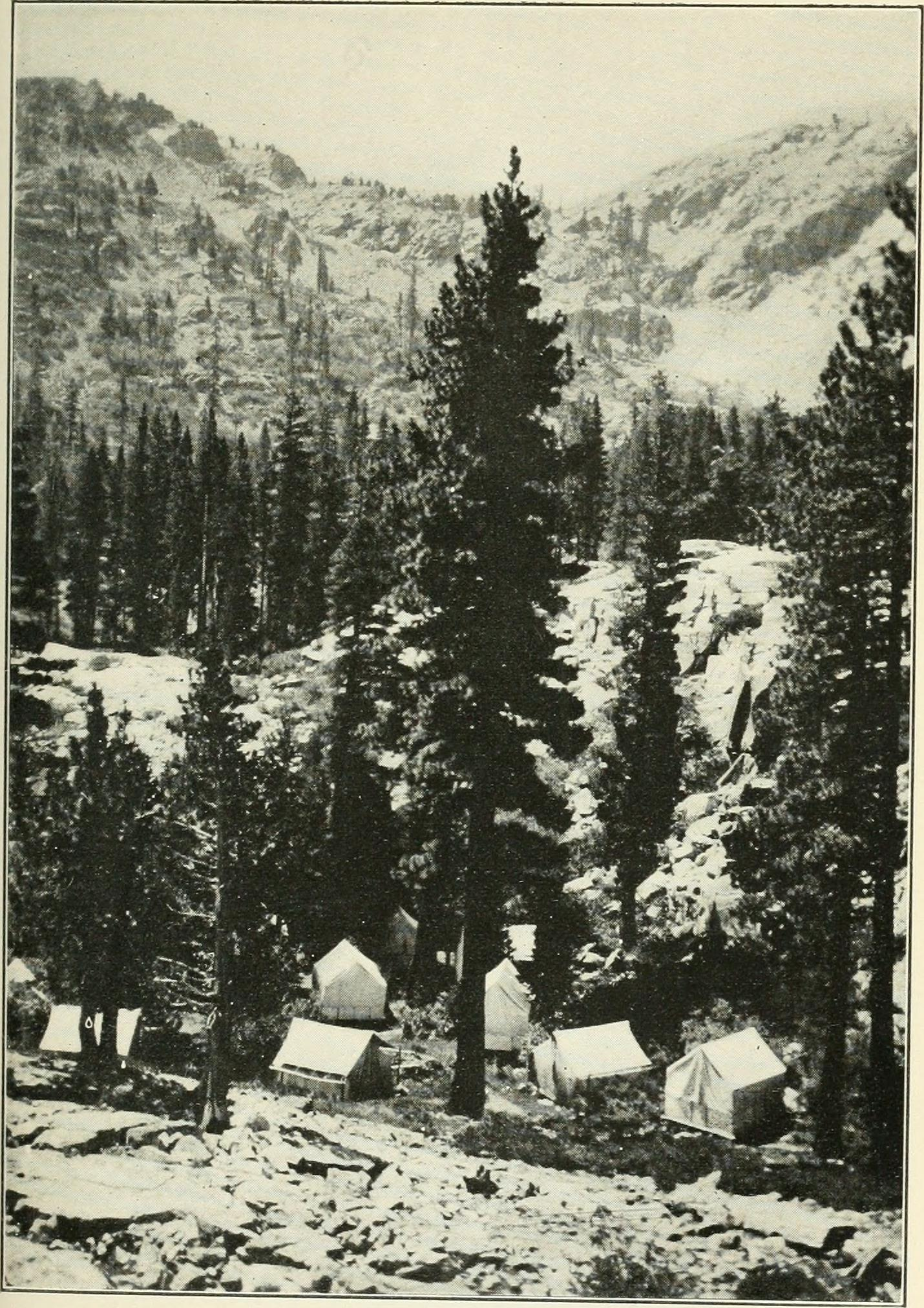
Glen Alpine Springs circa 1915

The Glen Alpine Springs trailhead or Glen Alpine trailhead is located off Highway 89 a few miles north of South Lake Tahoe, California, at Fallen Leaf Lake just to the west of Lake Tahoe. The road to the trailhead is not plowed in winter and can normally be accessed May - October. A mile up the trail is 'The Historical Preservation of Glen Alpine Springs'. Glen Alpine Springs was one of Tahoe's first resorts and was founded by Nathan Gilmore in 1863. It was privately owned until 1987 when it became an incorporated 501(c)3 nonprofit. 6 out of the 8 buildings on the property were designed and built by the famous architect Bernard Maybeck in the 1920's. Glen Alpine Springs was also visited by John Muir in 1890 and 1892. The Historical Preservation of Glen Alpine Springs is managed by its board of directors and is solely funded by donations.

Some of the destinations most accessed by the trailhead are Susie Lake (five miles) and Grass Lake (two miles), as well as the rest of the Desolation Wilderness.
