= Pyramid Peak (El Dorado County, California) =

Mountain in the American state of California

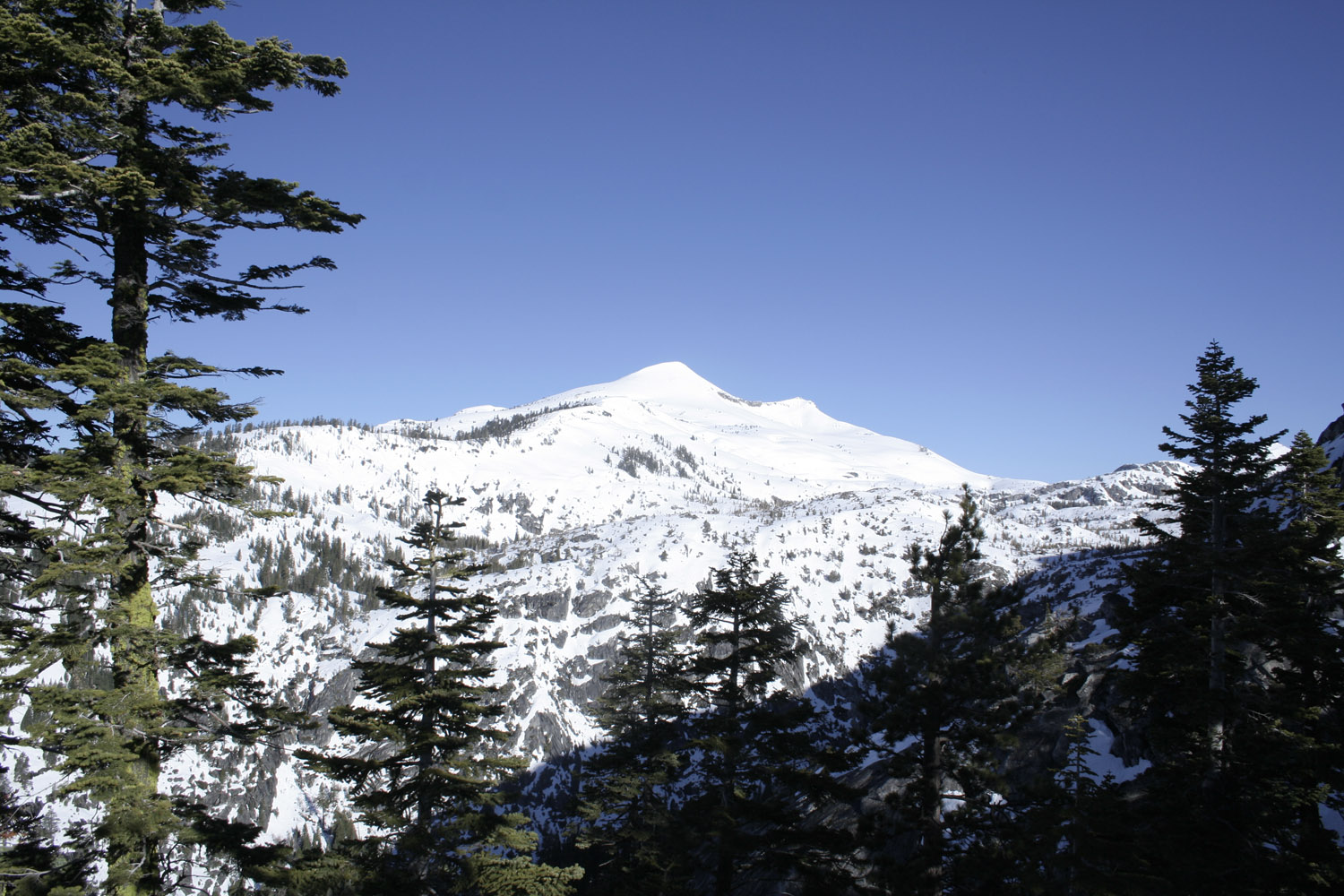
- Pyramid Peak as seen from near Mount Ralston: the summit route goes up the left ridge.

Highest point
- Elevation: 9,985 ft (3,043 m) NAVD 88
- Prominence: 2,583 ft (787 m)
- Listing: Sierra Peaks Section; Tahoe OGUL Star Peak
- Coordinates: 38°50′42″N 120°09′28″W

Geography
- Location within California
- Location: El Dorado County, California, U.S.
- Parent range: Sierra Nevada
- Topo map: USGS Pyramid Peak

Climbing
- Easiest route: Scramble, class 2

Pyramid Peak is a mountain in the California's Sierra Nevada in the Crystal Range to the west of Lake Tahoe. It is the highest point in the Desolation Wilderness. With an elevation gain of almost 4,100 feet (1,250 m), the Rocky Canyon route is the mountain's most popular approach although it is very arduous. To the east, at the base of the peak, lies Pyramid Lake.

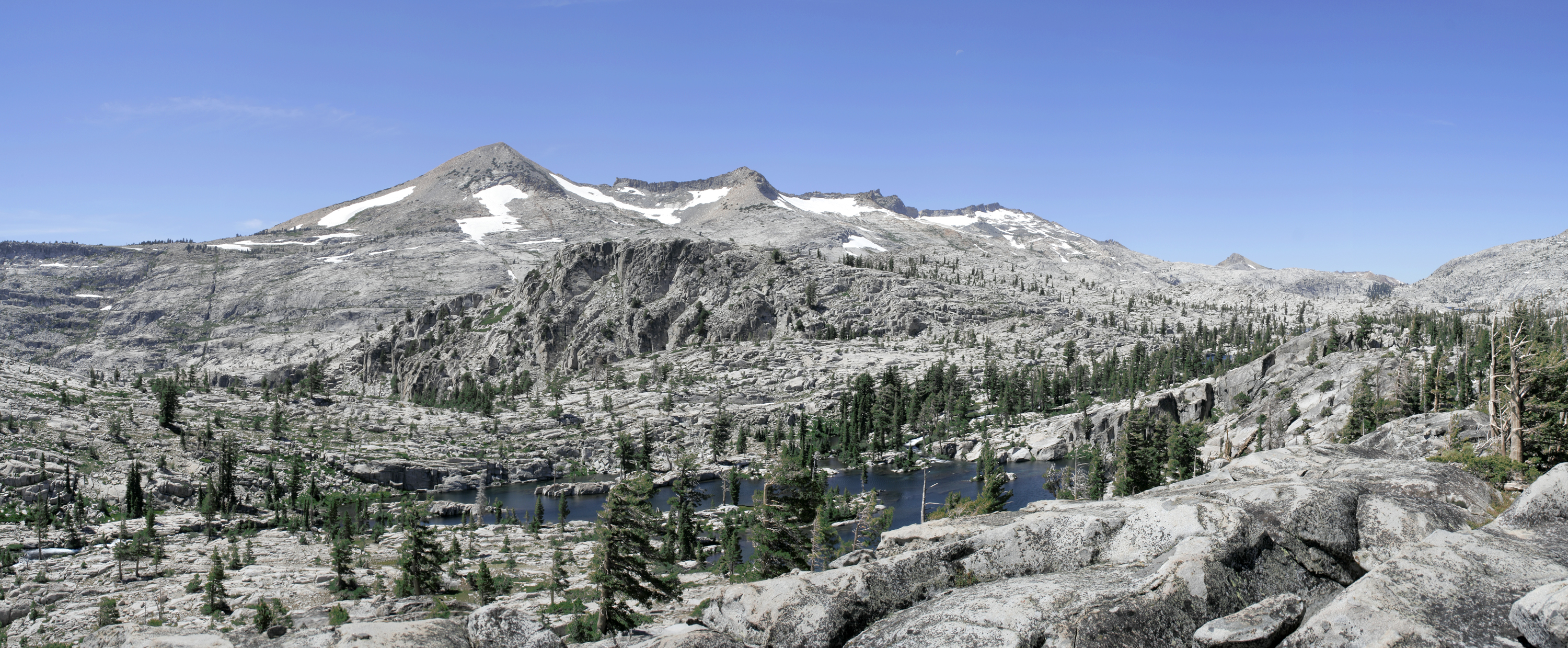
Pyramid Peak from the east
