= Crystal Range =

Mountain range in California, United States

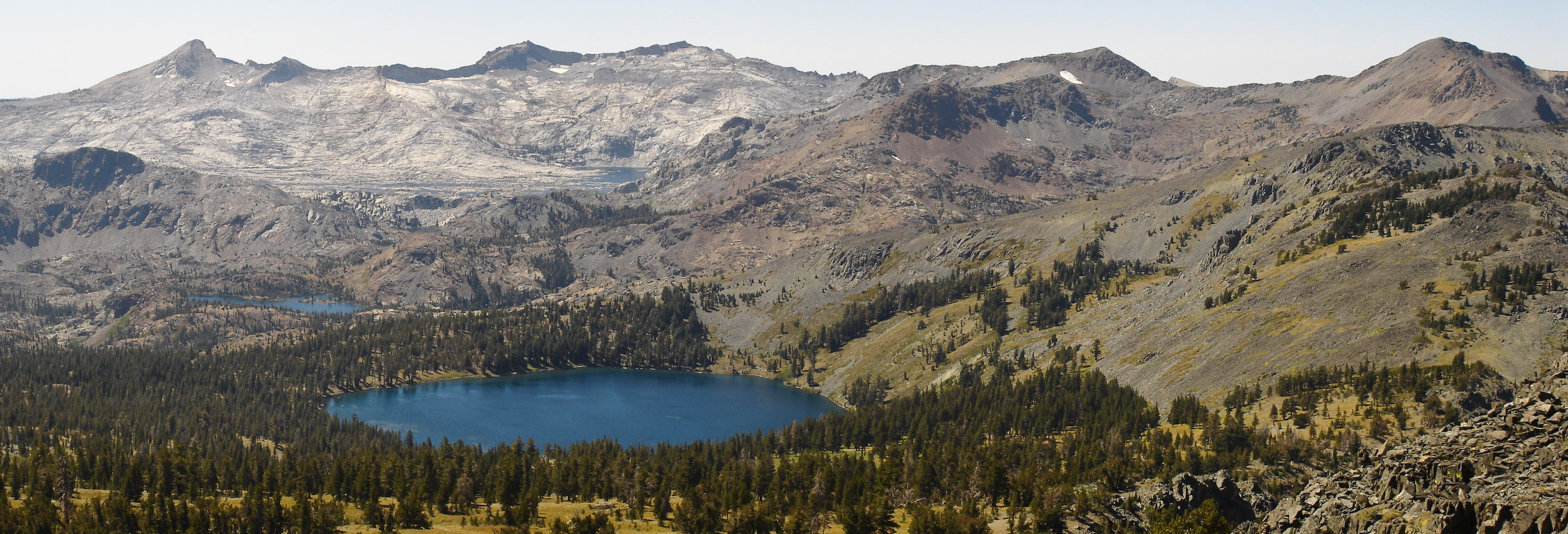
- Crystal Range and Gilmore Lake from Mount Tallac

Highest point
- Peak: Pyramid Peak
- Elevation: 9,985 ft (3,043 m)

Dimensions
- Length: 9 mi (14 km)

Geography
- Location within California
- Country: United States
- State: California
- County: El Dorado County
- Range coordinates: 38°54.8′N 120°13.0′W
- Topo map: USGS Rockbound Valley

The Crystal Range is a small chain of mountain peaks in the Desolation Wilderness in the U.S. state of California. It is a subrange of the Sierra Nevada. The highest and most southerly peak is Pyramid Peak at 9985 ft; Mount Agassiz is next north at 9967 ft, with Mount Price (9975 ft) rounding out the southern group of peaks. Tells Peak is the northernmost named peak in the range.

It is southwest of Lake Tahoe and north of U.S. Route 50. Two main access roads run off of U.S. Route 50, Ice House Road, which is furthest west, and more easterly, Wright's Lake Road which is a steep road not conducive to trailers or large vehicles. Many access the tallest peak Pyramid Peak from Hwy 50 directly hiking in, to the Desolation Wilderness.

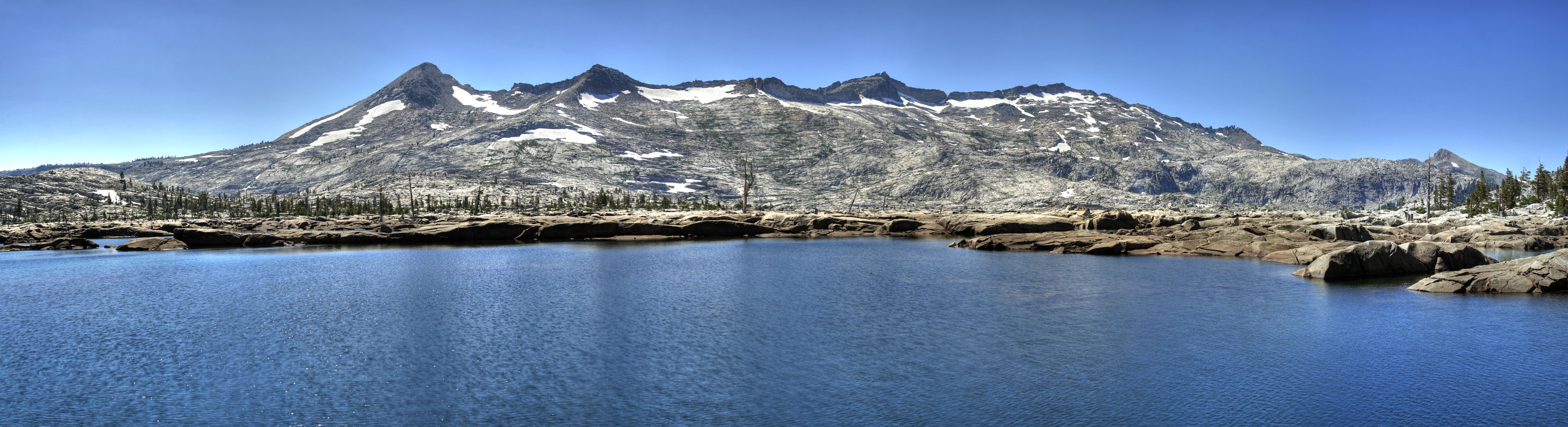
The southern Crystal Range seen from Desolation Valley near Lake Aloha

== Climate ==
Climate data for Crystal Range, California (38.9133°N 120.2167°W, elevation 8,996 ft / 2,742 m)
Month	Jan	Feb	Mar	Apr	May	Jun	Jul	Aug	Sep	Oct	Nov	Dec	Year
Mean daily maximum °F (°C)	36.9 (2.7)	35.9 (2.2)	38.4 (3.6)	41.5 (5.3)	49.4 (9.7)	59.3 (15.2)	67.9 (19.9)	67.8 (19.9)	62.2 (16.8)	52.4 (11.3)	42.5 (5.8)	36.4 (2.4)	49.2 (9.6)
Mean daily minimum °F (°C)	20.1 (−6.6)	18.2 (−7.7)	19.8 (−6.8)	22.1 (−5.5)	29.2 (−1.6)	38.1 (3.4)	45.9 (7.7)	45.7 (7.6)	40.5 (4.7)	32.3 (0.2)	24.9 (−3.9)	19.9 (−6.7)	29.7 (−1.3)
Average precipitation inches (mm)	16.86 (428)	14.83 (377)	14.82 (376)	7.69 (195)	6.15 (156)	1.51 (38)	0.23 (5.8)	0.45 (11)	0.88 (22)	5.12 (130)	8.05 (204)	17.86 (454)	94.45 (2,396.8)
Source: PRISM
