= Desolation Wilderness =

Protected wilderness area in California, United States

- IUCN category Ib (wilderness area)
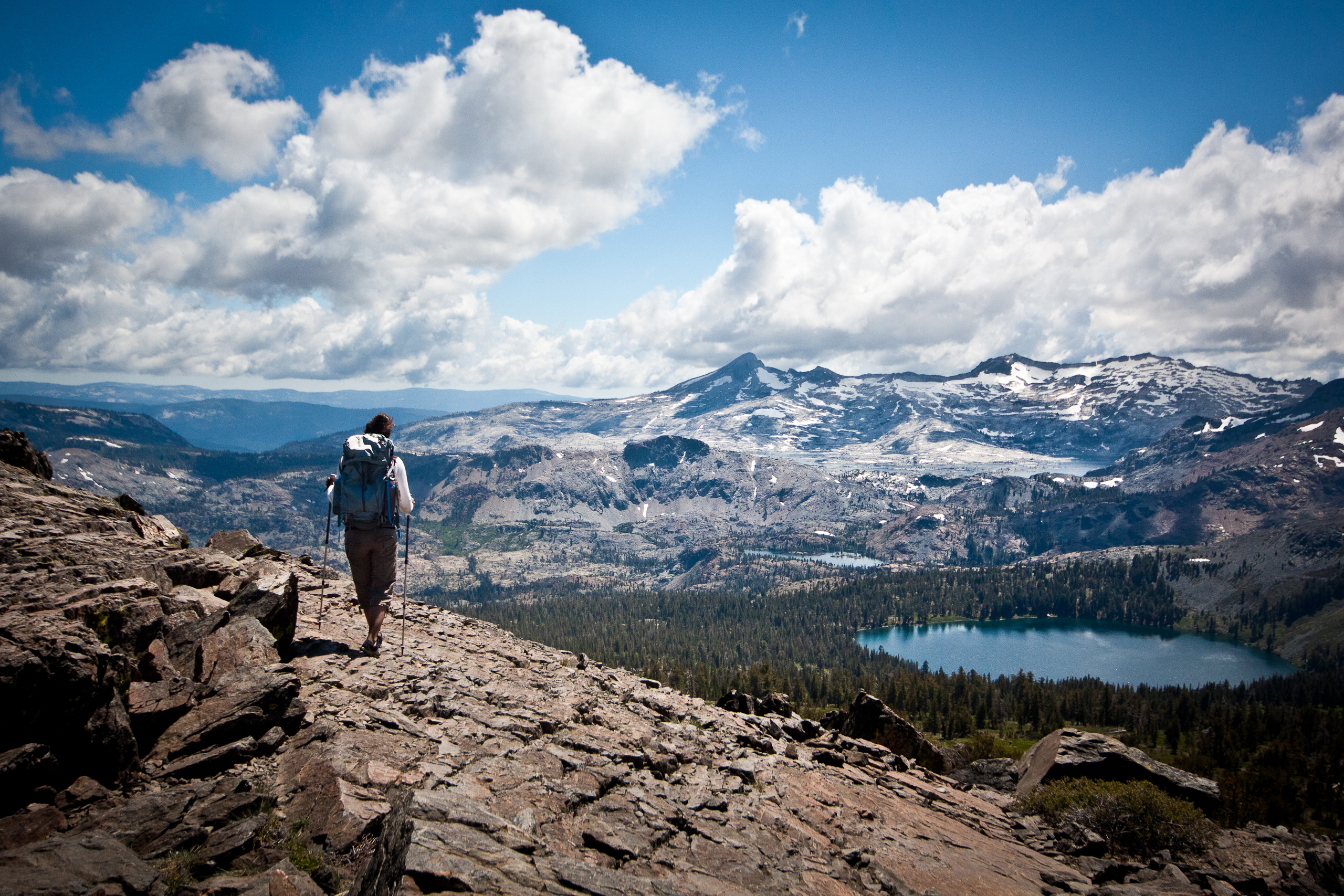
- Desolation Wilderness from Mount Tallac

- Location within California Location within the United States
- Interactive map of Desolation Wilderness
- Location: El Dorado County, California, United States
- Nearest city: South Lake Tahoe, CA
- Coordinates: 38°55′11″N 120°10′12″W
- Area: 63,960 acres (258.8 km^{2})
- Established: January 1, 1969
- Governing body: U.S. Forest Service

The Desolation Wilderness is a 63,960-acre (258.8 km^{2}) federally protected wilderness area in the Eldorado National Forest and Lake Tahoe Basin Management Unit, in El Dorado County, California. The crest of the Sierra Nevada runs through it, just west of Lake Tahoe.

== History ==
Before European settlement in the mid-19th century, there is evidence this area was used by the Washoe. After, it was known at times as "Devil's Valley", and most often used for cattle grazing. By the end of the 19th century, the first formal step was taken to limit its development when it was made a Forest Reserve, managed first by the United States General Land Office, and later, by the US Forest Service. It was set aside as the Desolation Valley Primitive Area in 1931 with an area of 64,000 acres (260 km^{2}). In 1969, it became the Desolation Wilderness after the passage of the Wilderness Act of 1964.

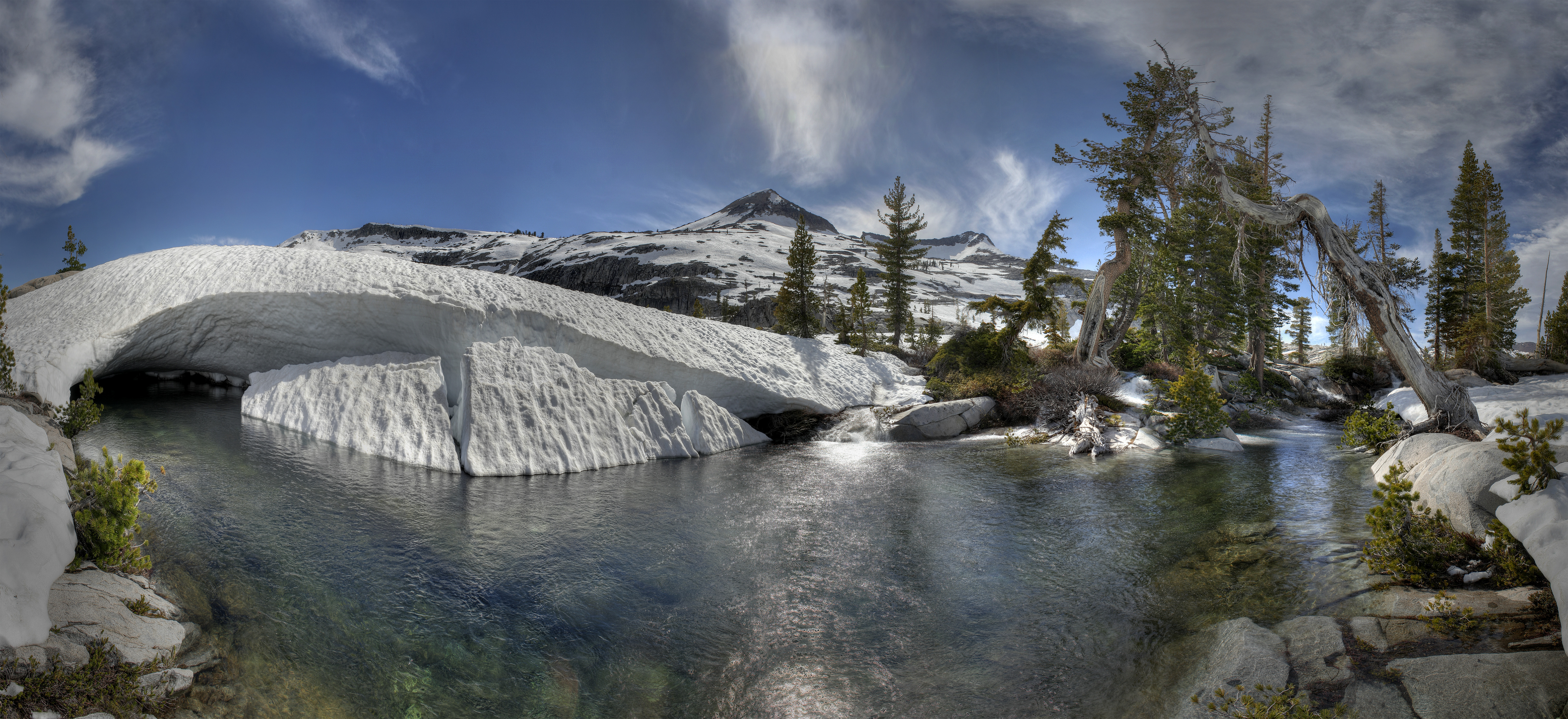
Pyramid Peak

== Access ==
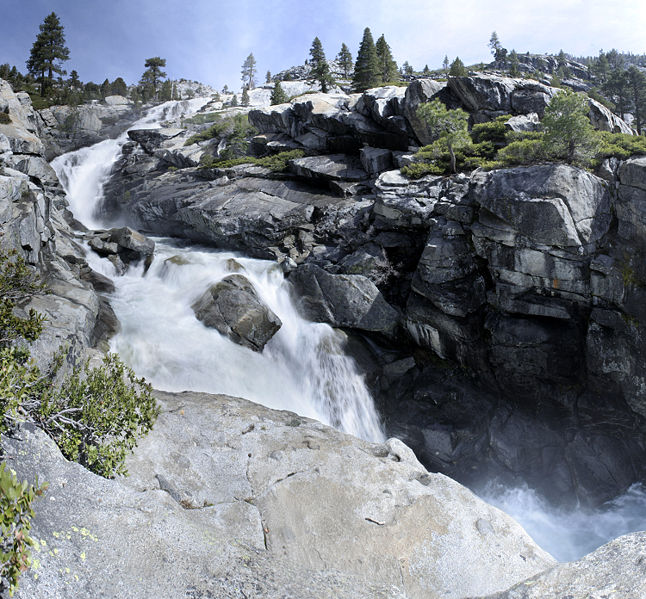
Horsetail Falls (California)

Desolation is a popular backpacking destination, with much barren rocky terrain at the edge of the tree line. It has extensive areas of bare granite rock formations.

The Tahoe Rim Trail and Pacific Crest Trail pass through the wilderness. A list of other trailheads that provide access to the wilderness follows.

- Loon Lake trailhead
- Buck Island trailhead
- Van Vleck trailhead
- Rockbound trailhead
- Twin Lakes trailhead
- Lyons trailhead
- Ralston trailhead
- Echo Lakes trailhead
- Glen Alpine trailhead
- Mount Tallac trailhead
- Bayview trailhead
- Eagle Falls trailhead
- Meeks Bay trailhead
- Pyramid Creek trailhead

Permits are required for both day use and overnight camping. In the summer, a quota system is used for overnight trips to limit the number of visitors on any given day in the wilderness. Desolation Wilderness is one of the most heavily used protected areas in the United States. This Wilderness area is split up into 45 different zones, with each having a specific permitting quota. Overnight permits are available online via recreation.gov and at select Forest Service ranger stations for a 'day of entry' permit, first-come, first-served. Day use permits are available at individual trailheads.

== Ecology ==
The Desolation Wilderness provides a home for many species of plants, fish and wildlife.

Desolation Wilderness supports predominantly red fir and lodgepole pine forests with associated species such as Jeffrey pine, mountain hemlock, ponderosa pine, western juniper, and western white pine. Most forested areas occur between 7,400 and 9,000 feet (2,300 and 2,700 m) of elevation, becoming patchy to rare at higher elevations. These hardy trees take root in excessively rocky and often nutrient-poor soils. As much of the ground surface in Desolation is bedrock granite: soils are limited. Decomposed granite accumulations are often shallow deposits within glacially scoured basins. The most extensive forested areas are found on moist soils bordering lakes, streams, and meadows. The limited tree cover in Desolation is valuable for watershed protection, wildlife habitat, and aesthetics.

The sparse woodlands of widely scattered western junipers and lodgepole pines are interrupted by patches of montane chaparral species such as pinemat manzanita, huckleberry oak, and mountain pride penstemon clinging to the expanses of barren rock. There are many wet meadows throughout the wilderness, each unique due to the differences in elevation, exposure, soil composition and soil depth, resulting in a wide diversity of annual and perennial plant life. A variety of wildflower species, sedges, and grasses inhabit these fragile wet areas. Aspen and willow are common to these wetland areas.

Mule deer are the largest of the game species found within the wilderness. Black bears are increasingly common, with individuals being displaced from the Tahoe Basin and lower elevation western slopes into the higher country. More common, yet seldom seen, are the smaller mammals like coyote, porcupine, badger, and bobcat. Species of special interest that are very rare in the area are the fisher, pine marten, red fox, and wolverine.

Desolation also provides an ideal habitat for numerous alpine rodents such as the yellow-bellied marmot, golden-mantled ground squirrel and Douglas squirrel. Also found is a member of the rabbit and hare family, the pika. There are also a variety of mountain birds, including the Steller's jay, Clark's nutcracker, mountain chickadee, sooty grouse, mountain bluebird, American dipper, and occasional golden eagle.

Within Desolation's numerous lakes and streams are also a variety of game fish such as the rainbow and brook trout. Less common, but also present are brown and golden trout.

== Geography ==
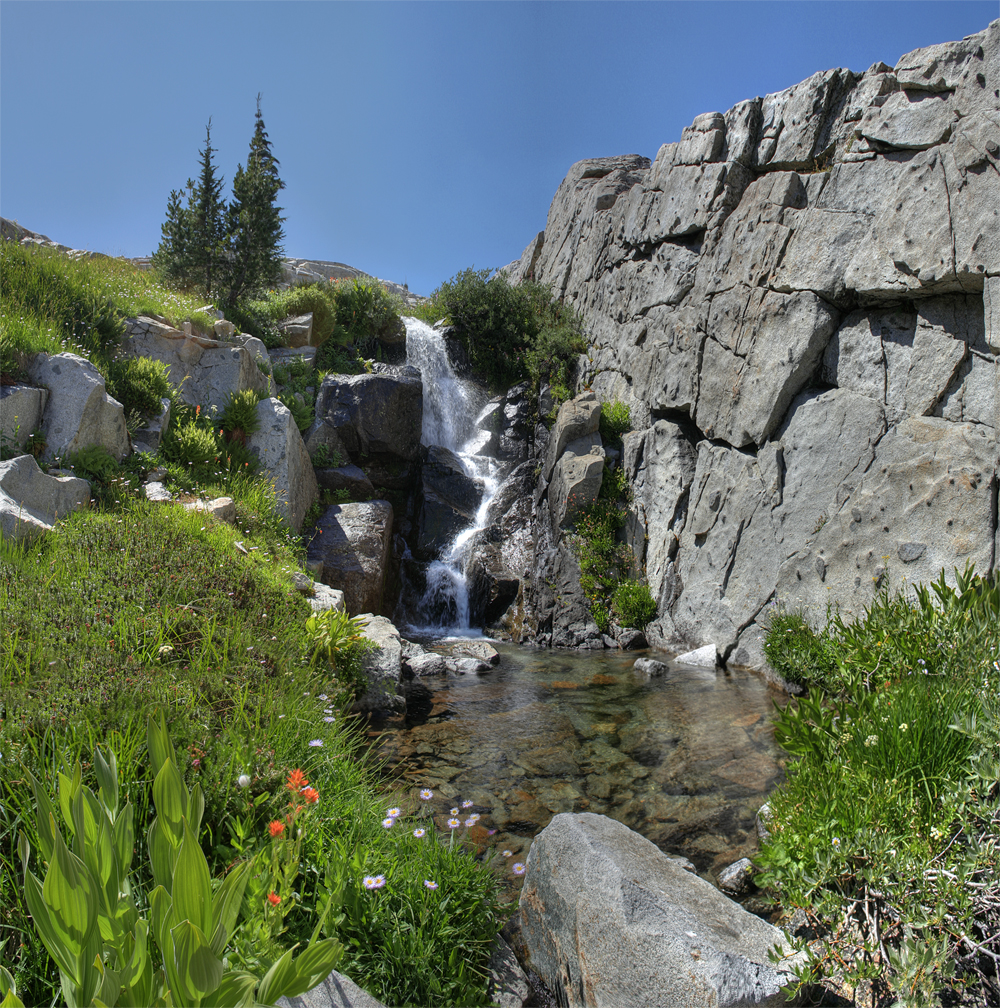
Snow melt drainage on the east side of Pyramid Peak

The Crystal Range is within the wilderness area, with Pyramid Peak as the highest point in the range and the wilderness at 9,985 feet (3,043 m) in elevation. Among the many waterfalls within the wilderness is Horsetail Falls.

Its largest body of water is Lake Aloha, a reservoir with shallow, clear waters sitting in a wide granite basin carved by glaciers of the last ice age. Many other alpine and wooded lakes of various sizes are scattered throughout the area.
