= Camino, California =

Camino
- census-designated place
- Location of Camino in El Dorado County, California.

- Location in California
- Coordinates: 38°44′18″N 120°40′30″W
- Country: United States
- State: California
- County: El Dorado

Area
  - Total: 2.57 sq mi (6.66 km^{2})
  - Land: 2.57 sq mi (6.66 km^{2})
  - Water: 0 sq mi (0.00 km^{2}) 0%
- Elevation: 3,133 ft (955 m)

Population (2020)
  - Total: 1,871
  - Density: 727.6/sq mi (280.94/km^{2})
- Time zone: UTC-8 (Pacific (PST))
  - Summer (DST): UTC-7 (PDT)
- ZIP Code: 95709
- Area codes: 530, 837
- GNIS feature IDs: 1658198, 2582961

Camino (Spanish for "Path") is a census-designated place in El Dorado County, California, United States, and, per the 2020 census, has a population of 1,871. According to the USGS, it lies at a mean elevation of 3133 feet (955 m.), but the elevation actually ranges between 3,000 and 3,500 feet. Being well over half a mile above sea level, it snows several times per year in the community. Nearby cities and towns include Pollock Pines, Placerville, Diamond Springs, El Dorado, Grizzly Flats, Somerset, Coloma, Garden Valley, Cameron Park, Shingle Springs, and Lotus.

Camino is a popular area in the fall for apple picking. As a result, Camino is often incorrectly mistaken as Apple Hill. It is also known for its many Christmas tree farm ranches and the annual Apple Hill Run.

Camino is located about halfway between Sacramento and South Lake Tahoe on U.S. Route 50. Its first post office opened in 1904. The ZIP code is 95709. The Camino community is served by area code 530.

== Demographics ==
Historical population
| Census | Pop. | Note | %± |
|---|---|---|---|
| 2010 | 1,750 | | — |
| 2020 | 1,871 | | 6.9% |
U.S. Decennial Census; 2010

=== 2020 census ===
As of the 2020 census, Camino had a population of 1,871 and a population density of 727.7 inhabitants per square mile (281.0/km^{2}).

The median age was 55.3 years. The age distribution was 331 people (17.7%) under the age of 18, 84 people (4.5%) aged 18 to 24, 340 people (18.2%) aged 25 to 44, 519 people (27.7%) aged 45 to 64, and 597 people (31.9%) who were 65 years of age or older. For every 100 females there were 102.1 males, and for every 100 females age 18 and over there were 102.4 males age 18 and over.

34.5% of residents lived in urban areas, while 65.5% lived in rural areas. The whole population lived in households.

There were 782 households in Camino, of which 190 (24.3%) had children under the age of 18 living in them. Of all households, 435 (55.6%) were married-couple households, 55 (7.0%) were cohabiting couple households, 152 (19.4%) had a female householder with no spouse or partner present, and 140 (17.9%) had a male householder with no spouse or partner present. 180 households (23.0%) were made up of individuals, and 116 (14.8%) had someone living alone who was 65 years of age or older. The average household size was 2.39, and there were 563 families (72.0% of all households).

There were 847 housing units at an average density of 329.4 units per square mile (127.2 units/km^{2}), of which 782 (92.3%) were occupied. Of occupied units, 570 (72.9%) were owner-occupied and 212 (27.1%) were occupied by renters. Of all housing units, 7.7% were vacant. The homeowner vacancy rate was 0.9% and the rental vacancy rate was 4.1%.

Racial composition as of the 2020 census
| Race | Number | Percent |
|---|---|---|
| White | 1,545 | 82.6% |
| Black or African American | 5 | 0.3% |
| American Indian and Alaska Native | 10 | 0.5% |
| Asian | 14 | 0.7% |
| Native Hawaiian and Other Pacific Islander | 4 | 0.2% |
| Some other race | 81 | 4.3% |
| Two or more races | 212 | 11.3% |
| Hispanic or Latino (of any race) | 154 | 8.2% |

=== 2010 census ===
Camino first appeared as a census designated place in the 2010 U.S. census.

== Politics ==
In the state legislature, Camino is in the 4th senatorial district, represented by Republican Marie Alvarado-Gil, and the 1st Assembly district, represented by Republican Heather Hadwick.

Federally, Camino is in California's 3rd congressional district, represented by Independent Kevin Kiley.

== Climate ==
The Köppen Climate Classification subtype for this climate is "Csa"(Mediterranean Climate).

Climate data for Camino, California
| Month | Jan | Feb | Mar | Apr | May | Jun | Jul | Aug | Sep | Oct | Nov | Dec | Year |
|---|---|---|---|---|---|---|---|---|---|---|---|---|---|
| Mean daily maximum °F (°C) | 53 (12) | 56 (13) | 58 (14) | 64 (18) | 72 (22) | 83 (28) | 91 (33) | 90 (32) | 84 (29) | 74 (23) | 60 (16) | 54 (12) | 70 (21) |
| Mean daily minimum °F (°C) | 38 (3) | 39 (4) | 40 (4) | 43 (6) | 50 (10) | 58 (14) | 64 (18) | 64 (18) | 59 (15) | 52 (11) | 43 (6) | 39 (4) | 49 (9) |
| Average precipitation inches (mm) | 7.4 (190) | 5.8 (150) | 5.6 (140) | 3.5 (89) | 1.4 (36) | 0.5 (13) | 0.2 (5.1) | 0.2 (5.1) | 0.8 (20) | 2.4 (61) | 5.4 (140) | 5.8 (150) | 38.9 (990) |
Source: Weatherbase

== Education ==
The CDP is served by the Camino and the El Dorado school districts.
