= Talking Mountain =

Mountain in California, United States

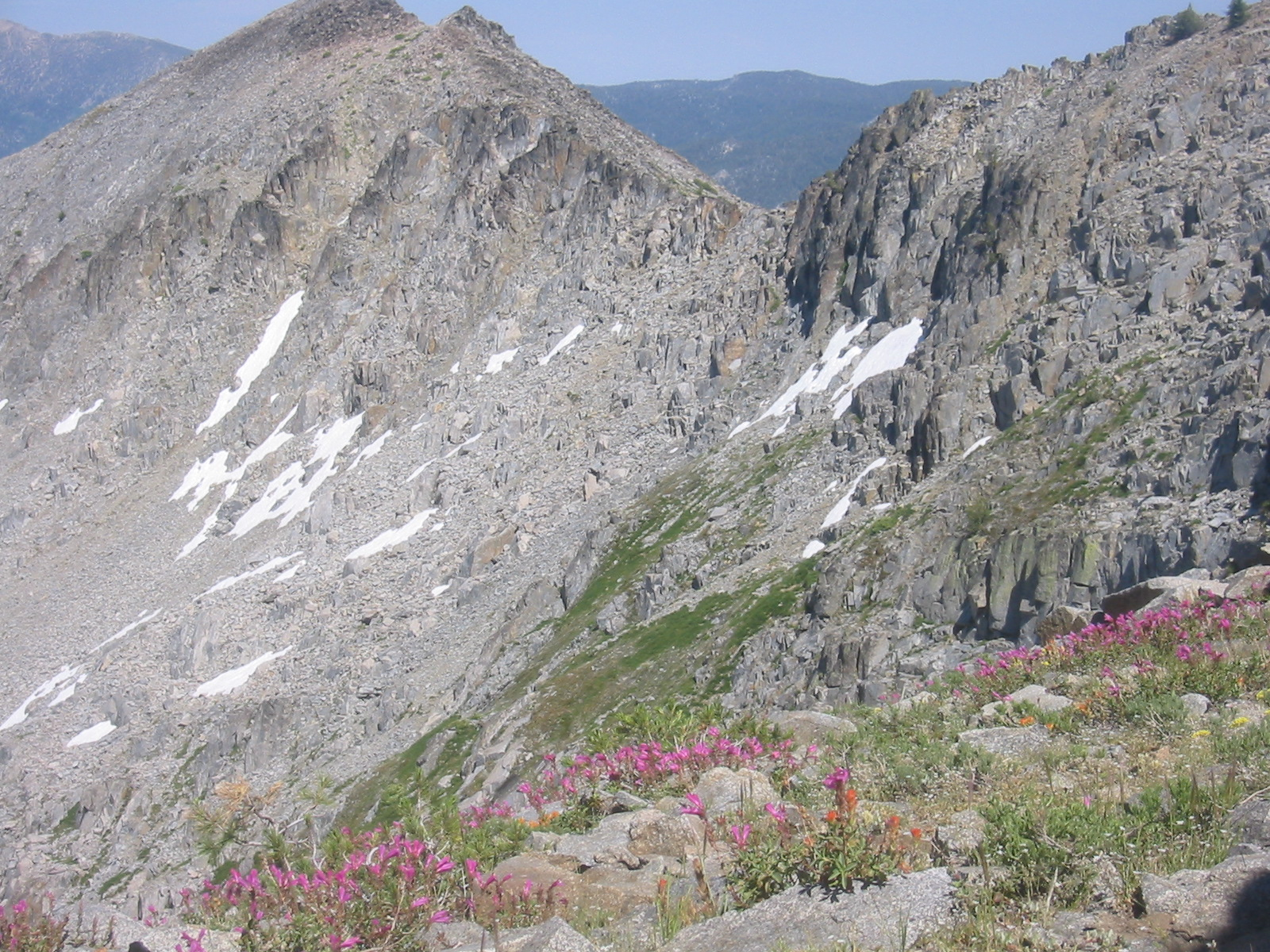
- Talking Mountain from Ralston's Shoulder

Highest point
- Elevation: 8,828 ft (2,691 m) NAVD 88
- Prominence: 104 ft (32 m)
- Coordinates: 38°49′58″N 120°04′09″W

Geography
- Location: El Dorado County, California, U.S.
- Parent range: Sierra Nevada

Climbing
- Easiest route: Scramble, class 2

Talking Mountain in El Dorado County, California is a peak in the Sierra Nevada located on the high ridge that extends eastward from the summit of Ralston Peak in the Eldorado National Forest. It is south of Lake Tahoe, south of Echo Lake and marks the border of the Desolation Wilderness. South of the summit, U.S. Route 50 follows the South Fork of the American River.
