= E36 =

E36 may refer to:

- Nimzo-Indian Defence, Encyclopaedia of Chess Openings code
- The BMW E36 automobile platform
- The European route E36 connecting Berlin to Bolesławiec
- The Federal Aviation Administration airport code of Georgetown Airport (California)
- Cryotech E36, a Potassium acetate based runway deicer
- Penang Bridge, route E36 in Malaysia
