= Omo Ranch, California =

Unincorporated community in California, United States

Omo Ranch
- Unincorporated community
- Location in California Omo Ranch (the United States)
- Coordinates: 38°34′53″N 120°34′24″W
- Country: United States
- State: California
- County: El Dorado
- Elevation: 3,612 ft (1,101 m)

Omo Ranch is an unincorporated community in El Dorado County, California, United States. It is located 12.5 miles (20 km) south-southeast of Camino, at an elevation of 3612 feet (1101 m).

Omo Ranch was once a logging town with a sawmill; the mill closed in 1973. Today, Omo Ranch is a rural residential area with a few county services. Its population in 2020 was 284 residents.

A post office operated at Omo Ranch from 1888 to 1974.

The name "Omo" comes from a Native American village.
