= Cold Springs, California =

Cold Springs, California may refer to:

- Cold Springs, El Dorado County, California
- Cold Springs, Tuolumne County, California
