= Apple Hill =

Brand of California apple growers

Apple Hill is the name of the Apple Hill Growers Association, and refers to the 55 ranches located in the Sierra Mountain foothills in El Dorado County, California, in and around the community of Camino. Since its formation in the 1960s, Apple Hill has become California's largest concentration of apple growers as well as a significant tourist destination noted for its rural ambiance, apple products including pies and cider, and other produce and attractions.

== Background ==
In the early 1960s, a pear blight encouraged growers in and around Camino, CA to switch their production to apples. Gene Bolster, who was an apple grower; Dick Bethell, El Dorado county's pomology specialist and farm advisor; Ed Delfino, the county's agricultural commissioner; and Bob Tuck, a retired army office, organized what is known today as the Apple Hill Growers Association.

== Starting a mission ==
The team started in mid-June 1964. They had finished preparing everything in August for the first press picnic. The picnic consisted of each Apple Hill family hosting a meal for some of the press members. Many of these press members became close friends. The growers also produced 50,000 paper litter bags that were passed out at the state fair. They offered 2 pounds of free apples to anybody who brought a bag with them on an Apple Hill visit.

Apple Hill consisted of 16 original ranches, eventually growing to 55 ranches including Christmas tree growers, and wineries, vineyards, a microbrewery, and a spa. In 2001, more than 9,300 tons of apples and 2,494 tons of pears were produced by local growers.

== Landmarks ==
A Rhode Island Greening at Larsen Ranch is believed to be the oldest apple tree in El Dorado County.
