= Somerset, California =

Unincorporated community in California, United States

Somerset
- Unincorporated community
- Location in California Somerset (the United States)
- Coordinates: 38°38′52″N 120°41′09″W
- Country: United States
- State: California
- County: El Dorado
- Elevation: 2,093 ft (638 m)

Somerset is an unincorporated community in El Dorado County, California, United States. It is located 6.25 miles (10 kilometers) south of Camino, at an elevation of 2,093 feet (638 meters). Its ZIP Code is 95684.

Somerset is a rural town located at the junction of Bucks Bar Road, Grizzly Flat Road, and Mount Aukum Roads.

Most of the land in the Somerset area is divided into ten acre properties. The main roads are asphalt but almost all of the other roads and driveways are dirt/rock.

The main business in the area comes from the many boutique wineries and wine tourism.

The post office was transferred from Youngs to Somerset in 1950. The first settlers came from Somerset, Ohio and named the place after their hometown.
