= Gilmore Lake =

Lake in the United States

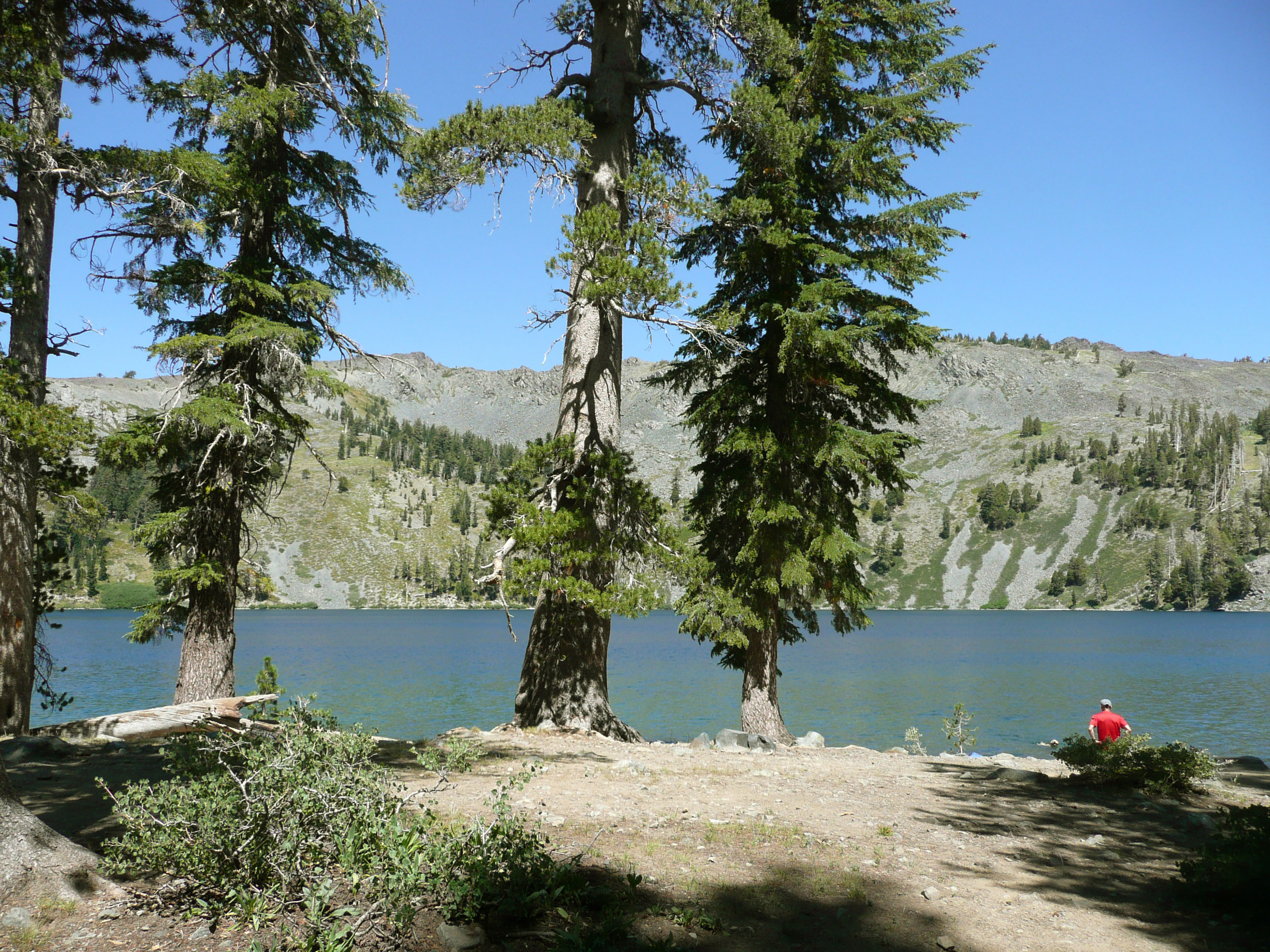

- Location within California Location within the United States
- Location: Sierra Nevada, El Dorado County, California, US
- Coordinates: 38°53′44.31″N 120°6′55.17″W
- Type: Lake
- Basin countries: United States

Gilmore Lake in California is a backcountry lake in the Sierra Nevada mountain range, to the west of Lake Tahoe in the Desolation Wilderness. It can be reached by hiking west out of the Glen Alpine Springs trailhead near the town of South Lake Tahoe. This lake offers great fishing for Lake trout.

== See also ==
- Category:Lakes of the Desolation Wilderness
- List of lakes in California
- Category:Lakes of the Sierra Nevada (United States)
