= Auburn Lake Trails, California =

Auburn Lake Trails
- census-designated place
- Location of Auburn Lake Trails in El Dorado County, California.

- Location in California
- Coordinates: 38°54′52″N 120°57′09″W
- Country: United States
- State: California
- County: El Dorado

Area
  - Total: 12.75 sq mi (33.02 km^{2})
  - Land: 12.73 sq mi (32.96 km^{2})
  - Water: 0.023 sq mi (0.06 km^{2}) 0.17%
- Elevation: 1,916 ft (584 m)

Population (2020)
  - Total: 3,388
  - Density: 266.2/sq mi (102.78/km^{2})
- Time zone: UTC-8 (Pacific (PST))
  - Summer (DST): UTC-7 (PDT)
- ZIP code: 95614
- Area code: 530
- GNIS feature IDs: 1733728, 2582982
- Website: www.auburnlaketrails.org

Auburn Lake Trails is a census-designated place in El Dorado County, California, United States. It lies at an elevation of 1916 feet (584 m). It is a gated community with 23 miles (37 km) of horse trails. As of the 2020 census, the population was 3,388.

== Demographics ==
Historical population
| Census | Pop. | Note | %± |
|---|---|---|---|
| 2010 | 3,426 | | — |
| 2020 | 3,388 | | −1.1% |
U.S. Decennial Census; 1860–1870 1880-1890; 1900 1910 1920; 1930 1940 1950; 1960 1970 1980; 1990 2000 2010

=== 2020 census ===
As of the 2020 census, Auburn Lake Trails had a population of 3,388. The population density was 266.2 inhabitants per square mile (102.8/km^{2}). The median age was 54.1 years. The age distribution was 17.1% under the age of 18, 4.8% aged 18 to 24, 17.2% aged 25 to 44, 32.7% aged 45 to 64, and 28.2% who were 65 years of age or older. For every 100 females, there were 86.4 males, and for every 100 females age 18 and over, there were 86.6 males age 18 and over.

0.0% of residents lived in urban areas, while 100.0% lived in rural areas.

The whole population lived in households. There were 1,419 households, out of which 20.9% included children under the age of 18. Of all households, 62.4% were married-couple households, 5.2% were cohabiting couple households, 19.0% had a female householder with no spouse or partner present, and 13.4% had a male householder with no spouse or partner present. 21.1% of households were one person, and 11.9% were one person aged 65 or older. The average household size was 2.39. There were 1,038 families (73.2% of all households).

There were 1,497 housing units at an average density of 117.6 units per square mile (45.4 units/km^{2}), of which 1,419 (94.8%) were occupied and 5.2% were vacant. Of occupied units, 91.5% were owner-occupied and 8.5% were occupied by renters. The homeowner vacancy rate was 1.7%, and the rental vacancy rate was 7.0%.

Racial composition as of the 2020 census
| Race | Number | Percent |
|---|---|---|
| White | 2,898 | 85.5% |
| Black or African American | 14 | 0.4% |
| American Indian and Alaska Native | 40 | 1.2% |
| Asian | 51 | 1.5% |
| Native Hawaiian and Other Pacific Islander | 3 | 0.1% |
| Some other race | 51 | 1.5% |
| Two or more races | 331 | 9.8% |
| Hispanic or Latino (of any race) | 297 | 8.8% |

=== 2010 census ===
Auburn Lake Trails first appeared as a census designated place in the 2010 U.S. census.
