= Mother Lode Union School District =

School district in California, United States

Address
- 3783 Forni Road Placerville, California, 95667; United States

District information
- Type: Public
- Motto: The Mission of the Mother Lode Union School District is the successful education of every student.
- Grades: K–8
- Schools: Indian Creek Elementary School Herbert Green Middle School
- NCES District ID: 0625980

Students and staff
- Students: 934
- Teachers: 40.33 (FTE)
- Staff: 57.65 (FTE)
- Student–teacher ratio: 23.16:1

Other information
- Website: www.mlusd.net

Mother Lode Union School District is a public school district based in El Dorado County, California, United States. Mother Lode Union School District was founded in 1954 in the conifer and oak foothills of California's Sierra Nevada's at an elevation of 1700 feet. The district consists of two schools; Indian Creek Elementary for students K-4 and Herbert Green Middle School with grades 5–8.

The district includes the majority of Diamond Springs and a portion of Placerville.
