= Gold Trail Union School District =

School district in California, United States

Address
- 1575 Old Ranch Road Placerville, California, 95667; United States

District information
- Type: Public
- Grades: Pre-K through 8th
- Superintendent: Keri Phillips
- Schools: Sutter's Mill School (K-3rd); Gold Trail School (4th-8th)
- Budget: $3.8 Million
- NCES District ID: 0615450

Students and staff
- Students: 593
- Teachers: 29.3 (FTE)
- Staff: 27.5 (FTE)
- Student–teacher ratio: 20.24:1

Other information
- Website: www.gtusd.org

Gold Trail Union School District is a small Kindergarten–8th grade school district located within El Dorado County, California.

It includes Cold Springs and Coloma.

== History ==
GTUSD was formed from seven one-room schoolhouses in 1956. Gold Trail School was constructed in 1957 to accommodate all K–8 students. The graduating class of 1960 consisted of nine students. In 1991, Sutter Mill Elementary School opened, and Gold Trail School was designated for 4th–8th grade students, while Sutter's Mill handled Pre-K through 3rd grade students. As of 2013, the graduating class consisted of 70 students.
