= Silver Peak (El Dorado County, California) =

Mountain in El Dorado County, California, United States

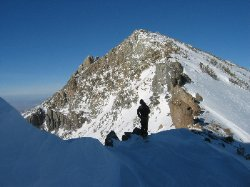

Highest point
- Elevation: 8,934 ft (2,723 m) NAVD 88
- Prominence: 250 ft (76 m)
- Listing: Tahoe OGUL Mountaineer Peak
- Coordinates: 38°51′50″N 120°10′29″W

Geography
- Location within California
- Location: El Dorado County, California, U.S.
- Parent range: Sierra Nevada

Climbing
- Easiest route: Scramble, class 2

Silver Peak is a mountain in the Sierra Nevada mountain range at the north end of the Crystal Mountains, to the east of Lake Tahoe. It is located in the Desolation Wilderness in El Dorado County, California.
