= Nugget Markets =

Grocery store chain based in northern California

Nugget Markets, Inc.

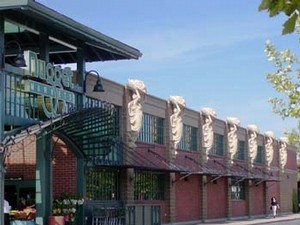
- Nugget Markets on East Covell Blvd. in Davis, California
- Type: Private
- Industry: Retail (Grocery)
- Founded: 1926 (100 years ago) in Woodland, California, United States
- Founder: William Stille; Mack Stille
- Headquarters: Davis, California, United States
- Number of locations: 16 (As of May, 2021)
- Area served: California
- Key people: Eric Stille (Executive Chairman); Greg Hill (CEO, President)
- Products: Bakery, dairy, delicatessen, frozen foods, grocery, meat, produce, seafood, snacks, prepared foods
- Services: Catering, Restaurants
- Revenue: ▲$400 million (2021)
- Owner: (Stille Family (100%))
- Number of employees: 2,000 (2021)
- Website: www.nuggetmarket.com

Nugget Markets is an American family-owned upscale supermarket chain operating within the greater Sacramento metropolitan area as well as in Marin and Sonoma counties in Northern California. It is headquartered in Davis, California. As of August 2022, the company operates 13 of its flagship Nugget Markets-brand stores, as well as Sonoma Market in Sonoma, Fork Lift by Nugget Markets in Cameron Park, and Food 4 Less in Woodland.

== History ==
In 1926, Nugget Markets opened its first store in Woodland, California by the father-and-son team of William and Mack Stille. Mack Stille ran most of the day-to-day operations and introduced full-line meat departments, refrigerated produce cases, and check stands with conveyor belts.

In the late 1970s, under the leadership of Mack's son, Gene, and grandson, Eric, the company began its expansion outside the local Woodland community by opening a Nugget Markets store in neighboring Davis. In 1984, Nugget Markets acquired a pair of Sacramento Alpha Beta grocery stores and converted them into Nugget Markets, one in the Pocket-Greenhaven neighborhood, the other in Foothill Farms, on Hillsdale Boulevard (both locations have since closed). In the early 1990s, Nugget Markets opened its first Food 4 Less franchise in Vallejo. In the late 1990s, Nugget Markets developed their Fresh to Market concept, pairing European-style open-air marketing with higher-end products and specialty departments, such as their Cheese Specialists, Wine Stewards, Pastry Chefs in a full-range Bakery, Full-Service Kitchen, Healthy Living Department, dedicated Seafood butcher and a Juice & Espresso Bar.

In 2006, Nugget Markets and a Bay Area-based developer has bought or acquired the leases of 8 former Ralphs stores in and around the Sacramento area. Two of the stores, in Elk Grove and El Dorado Hills, both of which were built from the ground up and originally opened as Ralphs, were eventually converted to Nugget Markets. Another Ralphs that was built from the ground up in Roseville, which Nugget was considering for a potential store, was eventually converted to Raley's (Nugget would eventually open a new Roseville store about 2 miles (3.2 km) to the north in 2021). The five remaining sites were converted to other retail uses.

In 2015, Nugget Markets acquired Paradise Foods with locations in Novato, Corte Madera, and Tiburon, and were rebranded to the Nugget Markets banner. Also in 2015, Nugget Markets debuted its new “Fork Lift” market concept in Cameron Park, which was a hybrid of its Nugget and Food 4 Less brands within the same store.

In 2016, Nugget Markets acquired Sonoma Market and Glen Ellen Village Market, both located in Sonoma County, in Sonoma and Glen Ellen, respectively. Both stores retained their respective names. Glen Ellen Village Market was later sold to Lodi-based Mar-Val Food Stores in 2018.

In 2019, Nugget Markets patriarch Gene Stille died.

In 2020, Nugget Markets moved its corporate headquarters from Woodland to Davis.

In 2021, Nugget Markets was ranked #24 on Fortune's list of "100 Best Companies to Work For," its 16th year on the list.

== Branding ==
Unique to Nugget Markets is their architectural feature at the entrance of new stores, which include a tower and/or a robed woman with a basket of food above her head. The robed woman, in particular, became the corporate logo and mascot of the company.

== Locations ==
=== Active Nugget Markets stores ===
- Downtown Woodland – 157 Main Street, Woodland, California
- El Macero – 409 Mace Boulevard, Davis, California
- Lake Crest – 1040 Florin Road, Sacramento, California
- Southport – 2000 Town Center Plaza, West Sacramento, California
- Park Plaza – 771 Pleasant Grove Boulevard, Roseville, California
- Browns Valley – 130 Browns Valley Parkway, Vacaville, California
- Oak Tree – 1414 East Covell Boulevard, Davis, California
- El Dorado Hills – 4500 Post Street, El Dorado Hills, California
- Elk Grove – 7101 Elk Grove Boulevard, Elk Grove, California
- Blue Oaks – 1509 Blue Oaks Boulevard, Roseville, California
- Tiburon – 1 Blackfield Drive, Tiburon, California
- Corte Madera – 5627 Paradise Drive, Corte Madera, California
- Novato – 470 Ignacio Boulevard, Novato, California

=== Active Sonoma Market store ===
- 500 West Napa Street, Sonoma, California

=== Active Fork Lift by Nugget Markets store ===
- 3333 Coach Lane, Cameron Park, California

=== Active Food 4 Less store ===
- 451 Pioneer Road, Woodland, California

=== Defunct stores ===
- Riverside – 6419 Riverside Boulevard, Sacramento, California
- Hillsdale – 5731 Hillsdale Boulevard, Sacramento, California

=== Unfinished stores ===
- Vallejo – Was to have opened in the northeastern section of Vallejo, California. Plans were cancelled in November 2006.
