= Cameron Park Airport =

Airport in El Dorado County, California

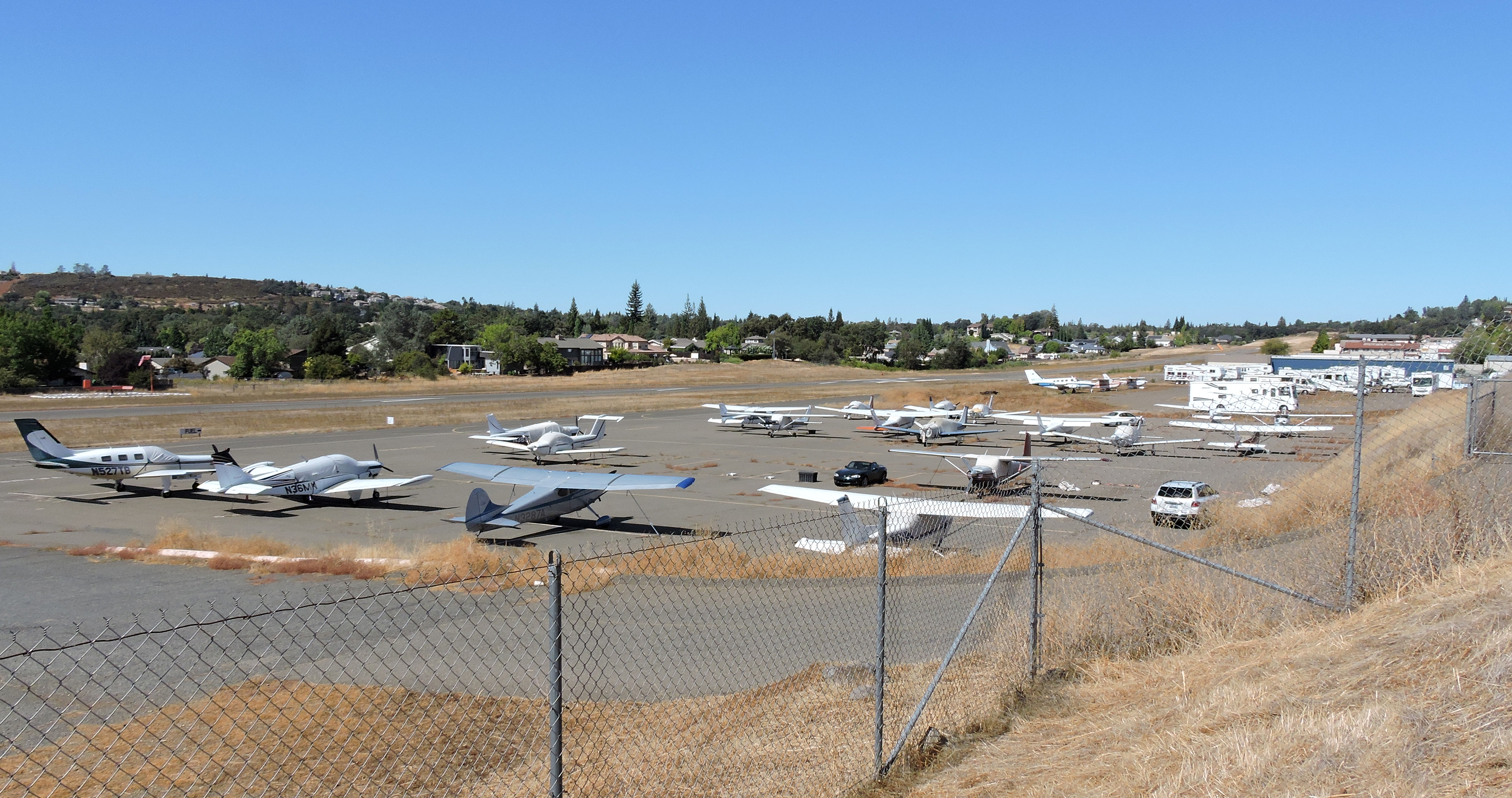
- Eastern side of the airpark
- IATA: none; ICAO: none; FAA LID: O61

Summary
- Airport type: Public use
- Owner: Cameron Park Airport District
- Serves: Cameron Park, California
- Elevation AMSL: 1,286 ft (392 m)
- Coordinates: 38°41′02″N 120°59′15″W
- Website: https://www.cameronparkairport.org/
- Interactive map of Cameron Park Airport

Runways
Direction	Length		Surface
Direction	ft	m	Surface
13/31	4,051	1,235	Asphalt

Statistics (2011)
- Aircraft operations: 36,036
- Based aircraft: 110
- Source: Federal Aviation Administration

Cameron Park Airport (FAA LID: O61) is a public use airport located in Cameron Park, El Dorado County, California, United States. This airport is included in the National Plan of Integrated Airport Systems for 2011–2015, which categorized it as a general aviation facility.

The area to the west of the runway is a residential airpark and residents can taxi aircraft through either of two electrically operated gates to the airpark. The airport is public and includes rented tie-down spaces, hangar spaces, and a limited number of transient spaces. The airport has never received federal obligation grant funds and is, therefore, not obligated to operate.

== Facilities and aircraft ==
Cameron Park Airport covers an area of 61 acres (25 ha) at an elevation of 1,286 feet (392 m) above mean sea level. It has one runway designated 13/31 with an asphalt surface measuring 4,051 by 50 feet (1,235 x 15 m).

For the 12-month period ending June 30, 2011, the airport had 36,036 aircraft operations, an average of 98 per day: 98% general aviation and 2% air taxi. At that time there were 100 aircraft based at this airport: 88% single-engine and 12% multi-engine.
