= Francis Lake (California) =

Lake in the state of California, United States

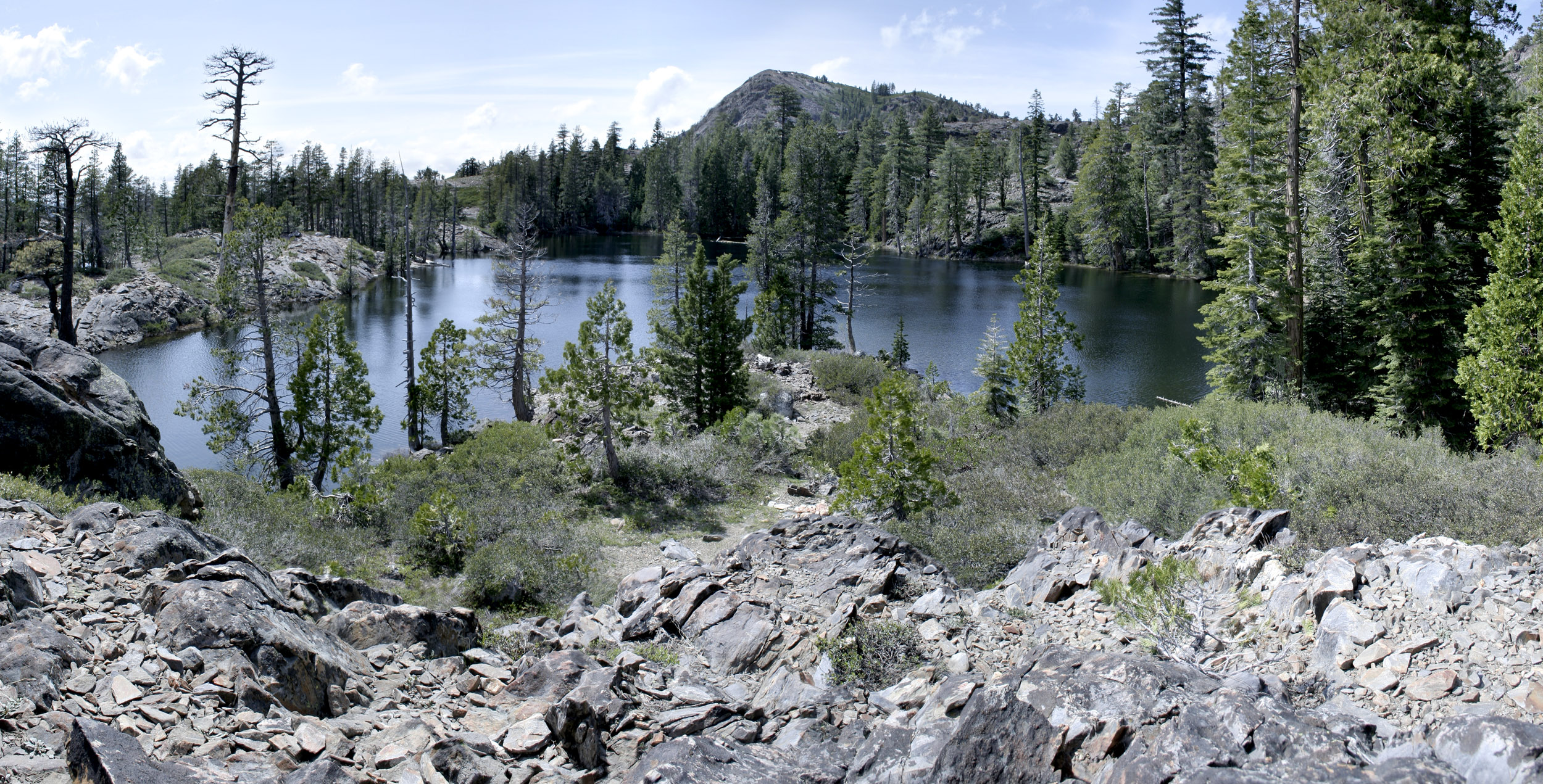

- Location within California Location within the United States
- Location: Eldorado National Forest, El Dorado County, California, US
- Coordinates: 38°59′32″N 120°20′23″W
- Primary outflows: Rocky Basin Creek
- Basin countries: United States
- Max. length: 200 yards (180 m)
- Surface elevation: 6,273 feet (1,912 m)

Francis Lake is a small backcountry lake in the Sierra Nevada mountain range, to the west of Lake Tahoe in the Eldorado National Forest. There are no trails to this lake. This lake is very near Loon Lake.

== See also ==
- List of lakes in California
