= Gold Oak Union School District =

School district in California, United States

Address
- 3171 Pleasant Valley Road Placerville, California, 95667; United States

District information
- Type: Public
- Grades: K–8
- NCES District ID: 0615390

Students and staff
- Students: 419
- Teachers: 21.6 (FTE)
- Staff: 22.61 (FTE)
- Student–teacher ratio: 19.4:1

Other information
- Website: www.gousd.org

The Gold Oak Union School District is an elementary school district in El Dorado County, California, United States. The district offers elementary and middle school services and serves an area known as Pleasant Valley near the city of Placerville. The District retained the firm of Earth Metrics Inc. to forecast enrollment growth and other demographic projections through the year 2020 in order to arrive at a facilities and staffing master plan.

The district includes a portion of Diamond Springs.

== See also ==
- Mother Lode
- Placerville, California
