= Camino Union School District =

School district in California, United States

Camino Union Elementary School District

Address
- 3060 Snows Road Camino, California, 95709; United States

District information
- Grades: K–8
- NCES District ID: 0607170

Students and staff
- Students: 370
- Teachers: 19.43 (FTE)
- Staff: 19.06 (FTE)
- Student–teacher ratio: 19.04:1

Other information
- Website: www.caminoschool.org

Camino Union Elementary School District is a public school district based in El Dorado County, California. It serves Pre-K through 8th grade.

It includes Camino and a portion of Pollock Pines.
