= Cold Springs, El Dorado County, California =

Cold Springs
- census-designated place
- Location in California
- Coordinates: 38°44′31″N 120°52′13″W
- Country: United States
- State: California
- County: El Dorado

Area
  - Total: 0.975 sq mi (2.526 km^{2})
  - Land: 0.975 sq mi (2.526 km^{2})
  - Water: 0 sq mi (0 km^{2}) 0%
- Elevation: 1,207 ft (368 m)

Population (2020)
  - Total: 556
  - Density: 570/sq mi (220/km^{2})
- Time zone: UTC-8 (Pacific (PST))
  - Summer (DST): UTC-7 (PDT)
- GNIS feature ID: 252652; 2628720

Cold Springs (formerly Cold Spring) is a census-designated place in El Dorado County, California, United States. It is located 4 miles (6.4 km) west of Placerville, at an elevation of 1207 feet (368 m). The CDP had a population of 556 as of the 2020 census.

A post office operated at Cold Spring (as it was then called) from in or before 1852 to 1874.

== Demographics ==
Historical population
| Census | Pop. | Note | %± |
|---|---|---|---|
| 2010 | 446 | | — |
| 2020 | 556 | | 24.7% |
U.S. Decennial Census; 2010

Cold Springs first appeared as a census designated place in the 2010 U.S. census.

The 2020 United States census reported that Cold Springs had a population of 556. The population density was 570.3 inhabitants per square mile (220.2/km^{2}). The racial makeup of Cold Springs was 477 (85.8%) White, 6 (1.1%) African American, 3 (0.5%) Native American, 5 (0.9%) Asian, 1 (0.2%) Pacific Islander, 19 (3.4%) from other races, and 45 (8.1%) from two or more races. Hispanic or Latino of any race were 52 persons (9.4%).

The whole population lived in households. There were 253 households, out of which 44 (17.4%) had children under the age of 18 living in them, 140 (55.3%) were married-couple households, 14 (5.5%) were cohabiting couple households, 87 (34.4%) had a female householder with no partner present, and 12 (4.7%) had a male householder with no partner present. 64 households (25.3%) were one person, and 43 (17.0%) were one person aged 65 or older. The average household size was 2.2. There were 177 families (70.0% of all households).

The age distribution was 83 people (14.9%) under the age of 18, 26 people (4.7%) aged 18 to 24, 94 people (16.9%) aged 25 to 44, 147 people (26.4%) aged 45 to 64, and 206 people (37.1%) who were 65 years of age or older. The median age was 59.5 years. For every 100 females, there were 103.7 males.

There were 270 housing units at an average density of 276.9 units per square mile (106.9 units/km^{2}), of which 253 (93.7%) were occupied. Of these, 203 (80.2%) were owner-occupied, and 50 (19.8%) were occupied by renters.

== Education ==
The CDP is served by the Gold Trail and El Dorado school districts.
