= Georgetown Airport (California) =

- IATA: none; ICAO: none; FAA LID: E36

Summary
- Airport type: Public
- Location: Georgetown, California
- Elevation AMSL: 2,623 ft / 799 m
- Coordinates: 38°55′16.01″N 120°51′53.26″W
- Interactive map of Georgetown Airport

Runways
| Direction | Length | | Surface |
| Direction | ft | m | Surface |
|---|---|---|---|
| 17/35 | 2,980 | 908 | Asphalt |

Georgetown Airport (FAA LID: E36), formerly Q61, is a public airport two miles (3.2 km) northwest of Georgetown, in El Dorado County, California, United States.

== Facilities ==
The airport has one runway:

- Runway 17/35: 2,980 x 60 ft (908 x 18 m), asphalt
