= Echo Lake (California) =

Lake in the state of California, United States

Echo Lakes
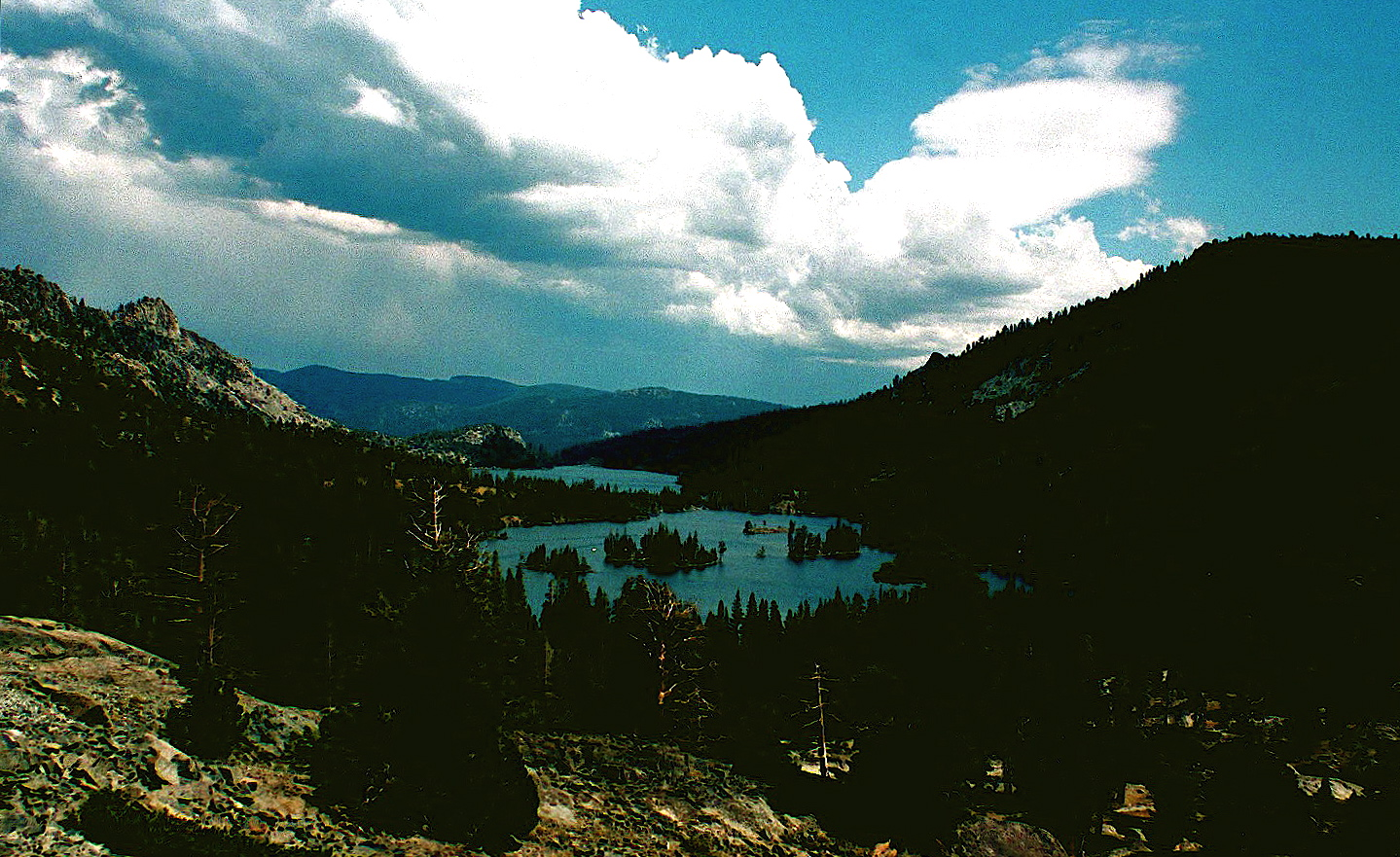
- Upper and Lower Echo Lake, California

- Location within California Location within the United States
- Location: El Dorado County, California, U.S.
- Coordinates: 38°50′34″N 120°04′32″W
- Basin countries: United States
- Max. depth: 303 ft (92 m)
- Surface elevation: 2,260 m (7,410 ft)

Echo Lake, is the name of a glacial lake—summer reservoir located in El Dorado County, eastern California, United States.

== Geography ==
Echo Lake is in the Sierra Nevada, and within the El Dorado National Forest. The lake is approximately 2 miles (3.2 km) from Highway 50 at Echo Summit.

The lake is divided into two sections; an Upper lake, and a Lower lake. The elevation of Echo lake is maintained in summer months with a dam at 7,414 feet (2,260 m) above sea level. There has been little development beyond lakeside cabins.

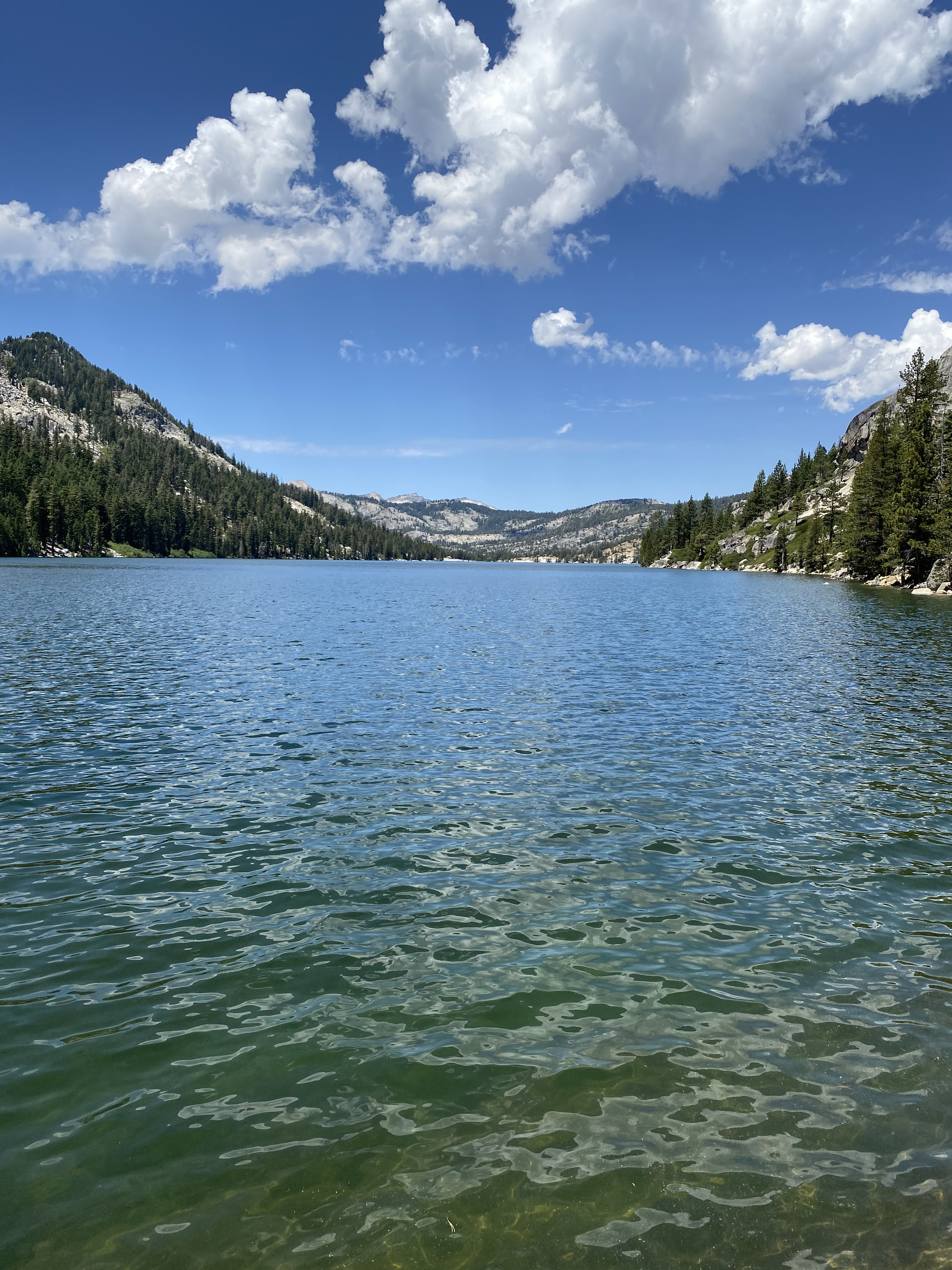
Lower Echo Lake, California

== See also ==
- List of lakes in California
