= El Dorado County, California =

County in California, United States

Coordinates: 38.78°N 120.53°W

El Dorado County
- County
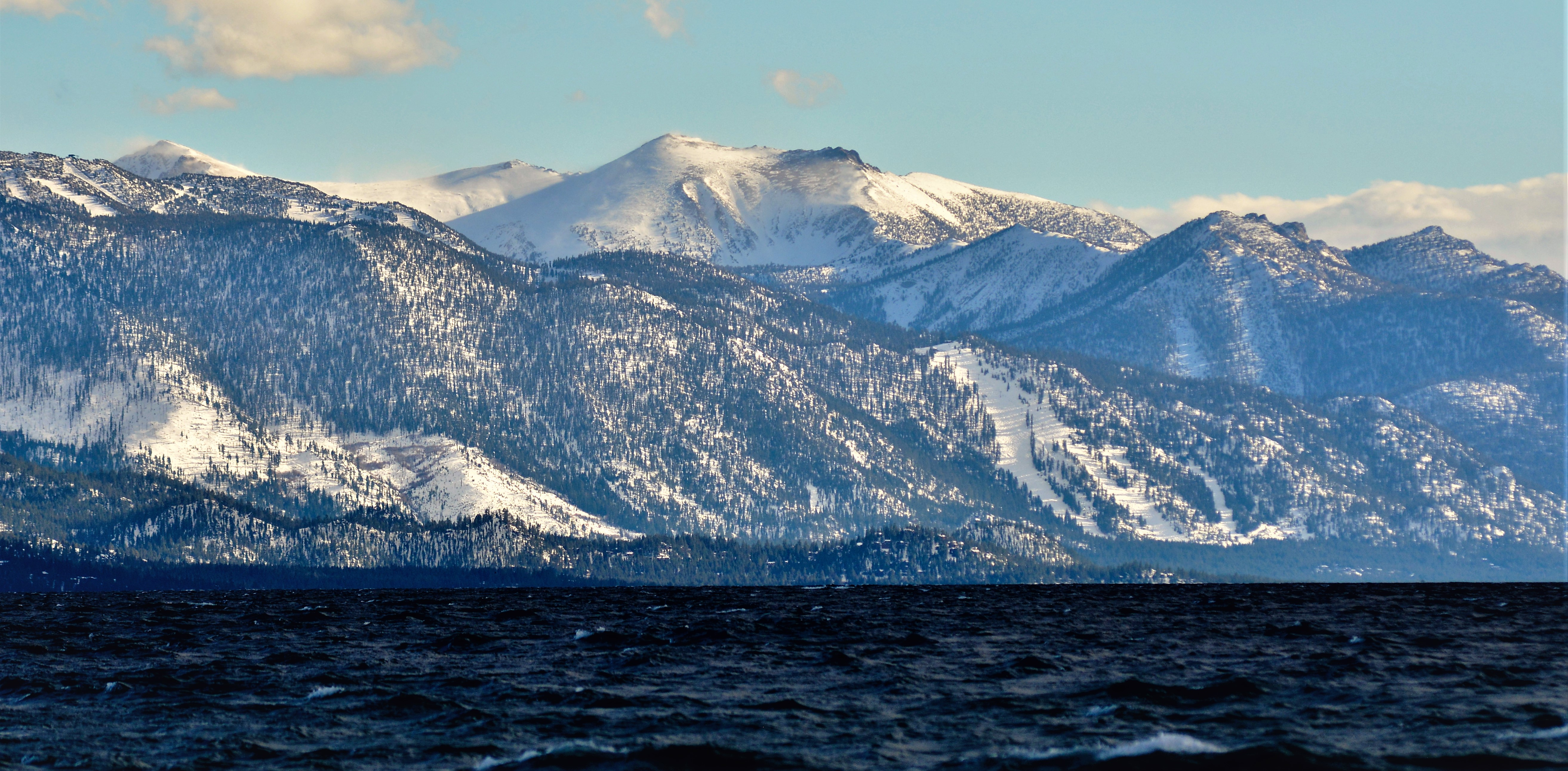
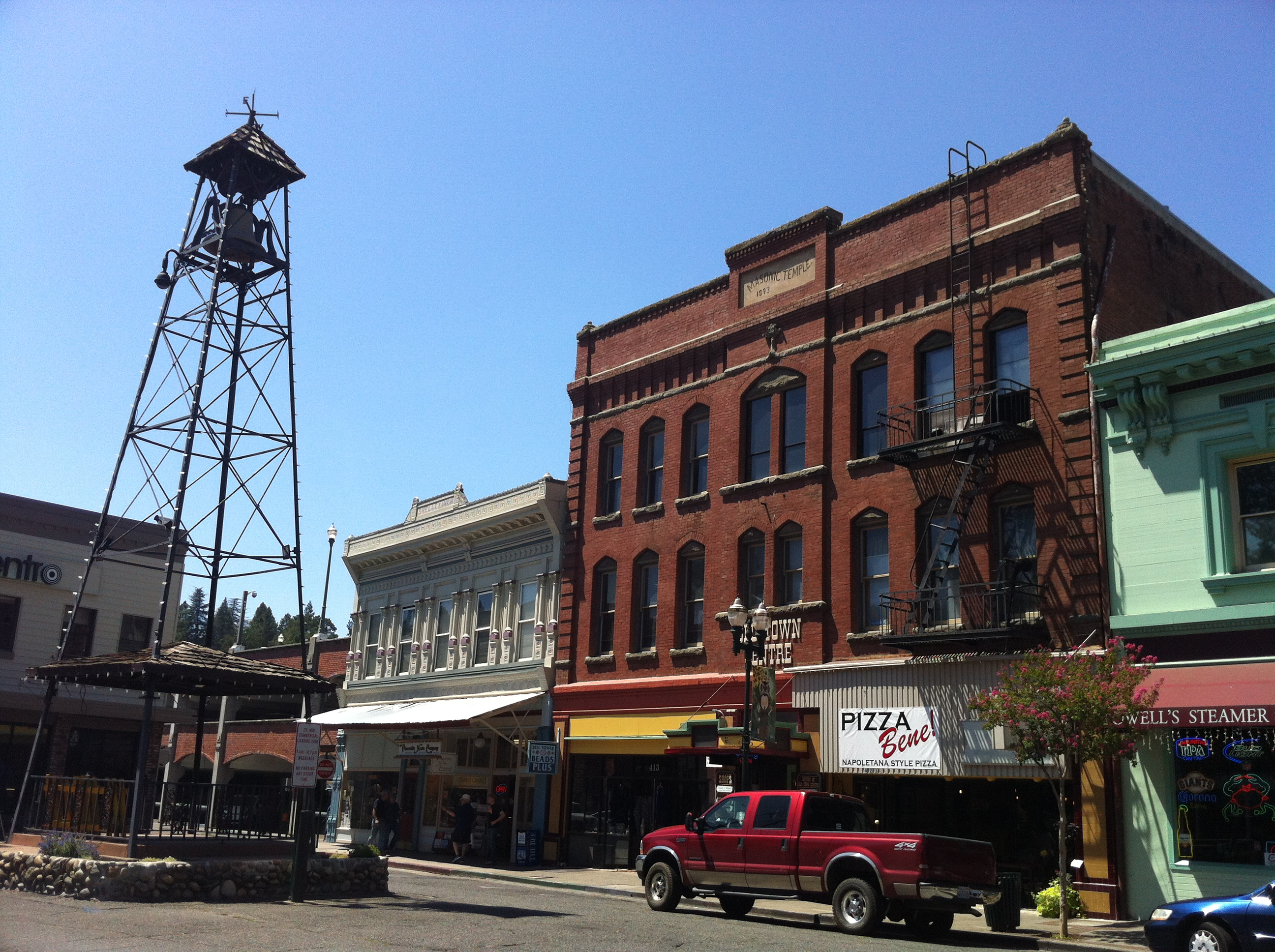
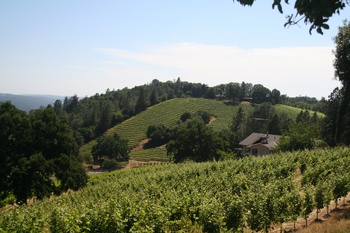
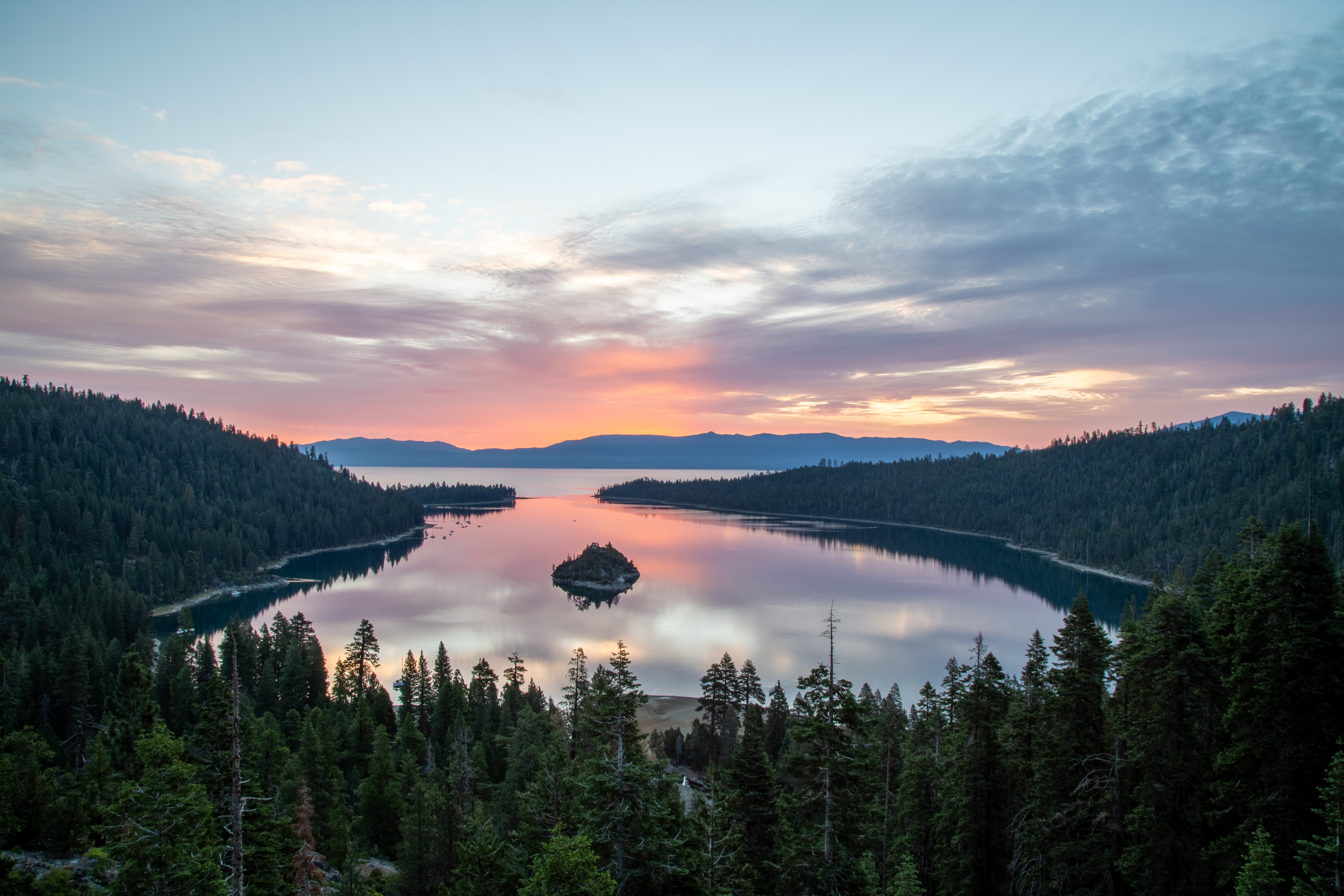
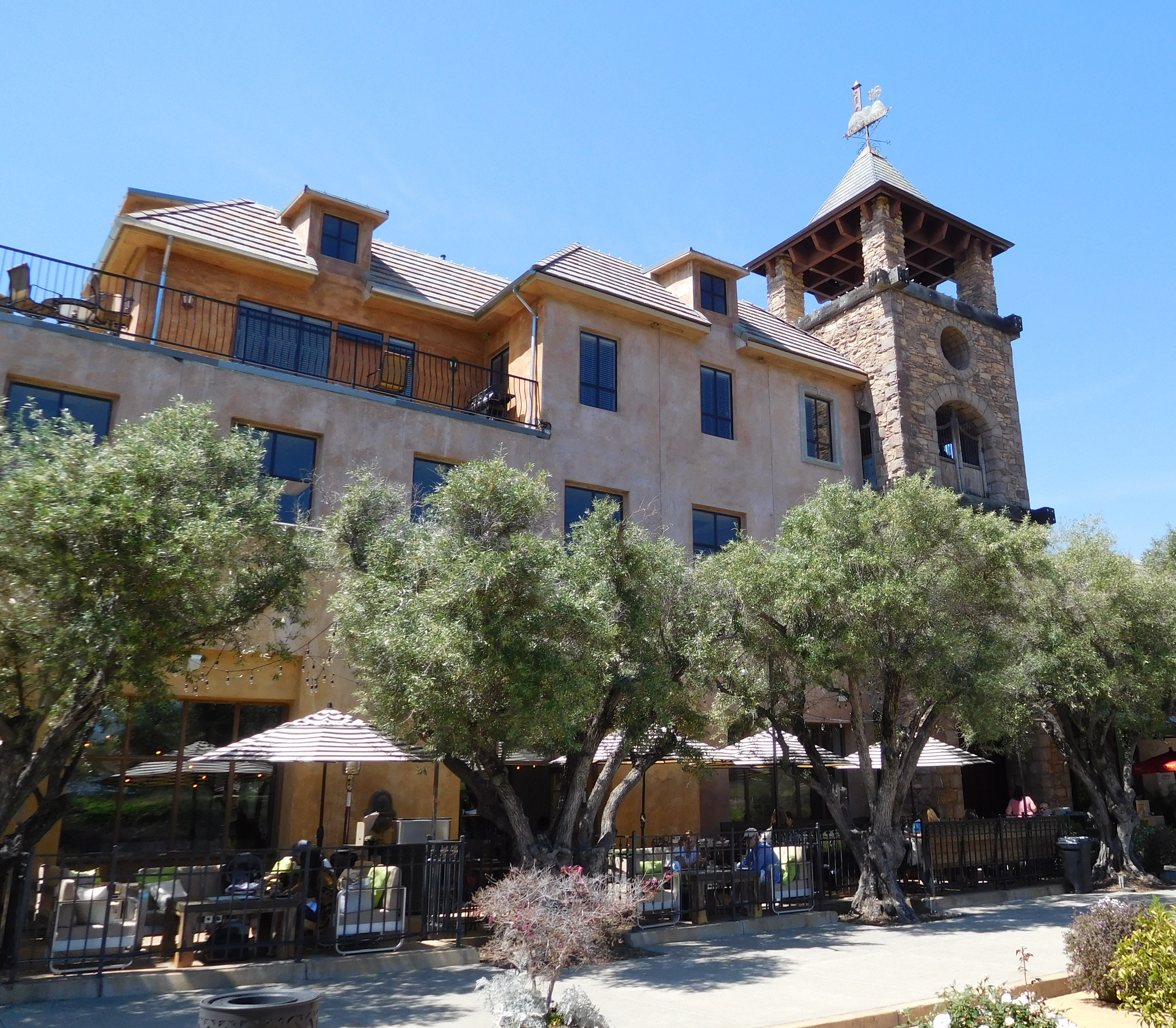
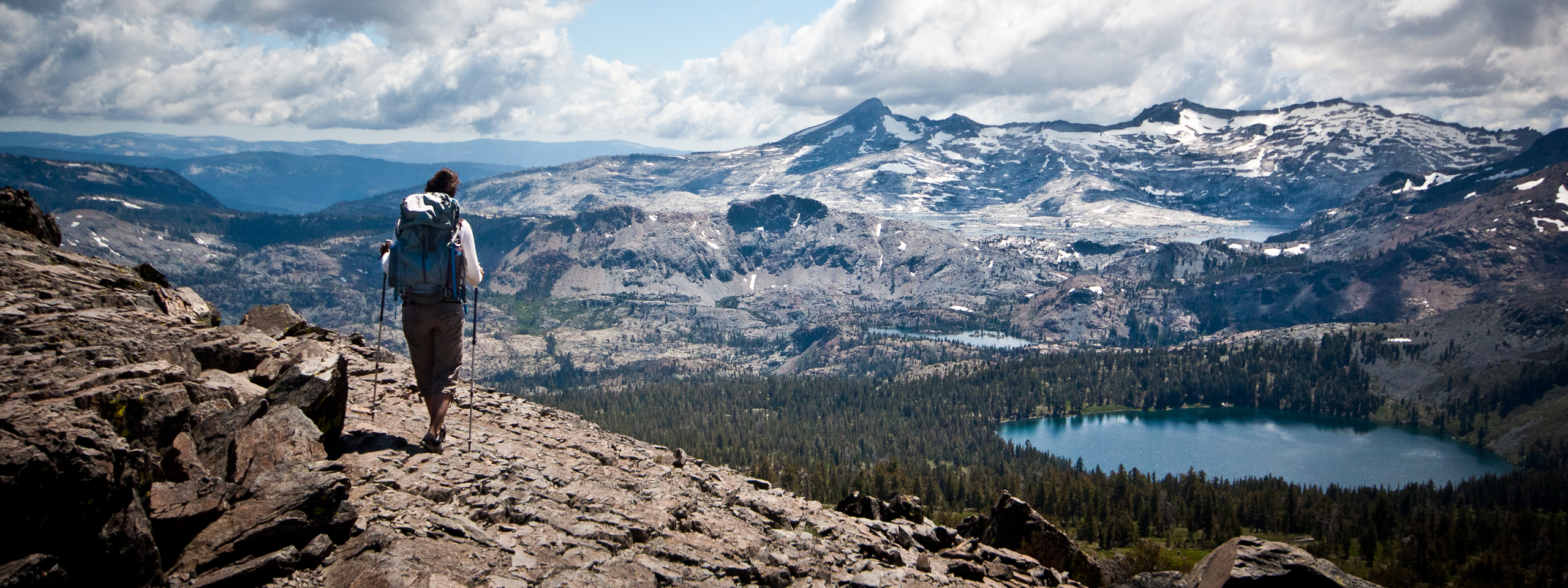
- Freel Peak seen from Lake Tahoe Placerville El Dorado AVA Emerald Bay El Dorado Hills Desolation Wilderness in Eldorado Forest

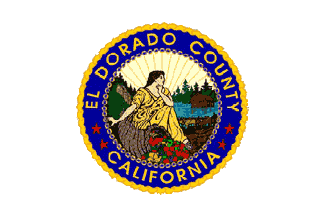
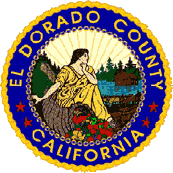
- Flag Seal

- Location in the state of California
- Interactive map of El Dorado County
- Country: United States
- State: California
- Regions: Sierra Nevada & Gold Country
- Metropolitan area: Greater Sacramento
- Incorporated: February 18, 1850
- Named for: Spanish for "the golden" and El Dorado
- County seat: Placerville
- Largest community: El Dorado Hills

Government
  - Type: Council–CAO
  - Body: Board of Supervisors: Greg Ferrero; George Turnboo; Brian Veerkamp; Lori Parlin; Brooke Laine
  - Chair: Brooke Laine
  - Vice Chair: Brian Veerkamp
  - Chief Administrative Officer: Tiffany Schmid

Area
  - Total: 1,804 sq mi (4,670 km^{2})
  - Land: 1,708 sq mi (4,420 km^{2})
  - Water: 96 sq mi (250 km^{2})
- Highest elevation (Freel Peak): 10,886 ft (3,318 m)

Population (2020)
  - Total: 191,185
  - Estimate (2025): 192,323 ▲
  - Density: 111.9/sq mi (43.22/km^{2})

GDP
  - Total: $9.877 billion (2022)
- Time zone: UTC−8 (Pacific Time Zone)
  - Summer (DST): UTC−7 (Pacific Daylight Time)
- ZIP code: 95762
- Area code: 530, 837, 916, 279
- FIPS code: 06-017
- GNIS feature ID: 277273
- Congressional districts: 3rd, 5th
- Website: www.eldoradocounty.ca.gov

El Dorado County (/ˌɛl dəˈrɑːdoʊ/; El Dorado, Spanish for "The Golden one"), officially the County of El Dorado, is a county located in the U.S. state of California, named after the mythical city of El Dorado. As of the 2020 census, the population was 191,185. The county seat is Placerville. The county is part of the Sacramento-Roseville-Arden-Arcade, CA Metropolitan Statistical Area. It is located entirely in the Sierra Nevada, from the historic Gold Country in the western foothills to the High Sierra in the east. El Dorado County's population has grown as Greater Sacramento has expanded into the region. Where the county line crosses US 50 at Clarksville, the distance to Sacramento is 15 miles (24 km). In the county's high altitude eastern end at Lake Tahoe, environmental awareness and environmental protection initiatives have grown along with the population since the 1960 Winter Olympics, hosted at the former Squaw Valley Ski Resort in neighboring Placer County.

== History ==
The Indigenous nations of the Maidu, Nisenan, Washoe, and Miwok have been located in El Dorado County for thousands of years. The region is notable for being the site of the 1848 discovery that started the California Gold Rush. As a result, the name "El Dorado" was derived from the Spanish word for, "The Gilded One". The County of El Dorado was one of California's original 27 counties created effective February 18, 1850 (the number has risen to 58 today).

The final segments of the Pony Express mail route ran through El Dorado County until its replacement with the telegraph service in 1861; U.S. Route 50 follows the Pony Express route today.

The Placerville Mountain Democrat, California's oldest surviving newspaper, serves El Dorado County.

The Caldor Fire started on August 14, 2021, near Little Mountain, south of Pollock Pines in El Dorado County, about two miles (3.2 km) east of Omo Ranch and four miles (6.4 km) south of Grizzly Flats. It initially burned slowly, but exploded in size on August 16 due to high winds. By the night of August 16, it was 6,500 acres (2,600 ha). On August 17, the fire grew to 30,000 acres (12,000 ha) as it expanded rapidly north and east, crossing the North Fork Cosumnes River and approaching Sly Park Reservoir. By August 20, the fire had burned nearly to U.S. Route 50, forcing a closure of the highway. Over the next few days, the fire crossed Highway 50 in the vicinity of Kyburz. Starting on August 27, winds drove the fire rapidly east towards the Lake Tahoe Basin. By August 30, it had reached Echo Summit, less than five miles (8.0 km) from South Lake Tahoe.

There are only two municipalities in El Dorado County: Placerville and South Lake Tahoe.

== Government and policing ==
=== Policing ===
The El Dorado County Sheriff provides court protection, county jail administration, and coroner service for all of the county and provides patrol and detective services for the unincorporated areas of the county. Incorporated cities Placerville, population 11,000, and South Lake Tahoe, population 22,000, have municipal police departments.

== Geography ==
According to the U.S. Census Bureau, the county has a total area of 1,786 square miles (4,630 km^{2}), of which 1,708 square miles (4,420 km^{2}) is land and 78 square miles (200 km^{2}) (4.4%) is water.

The county, owing to its location in the Sierra Nevada, consists of rolling hills and mountainous terrain. The northeast corner is in the Lake Tahoe Basin (part of the Great Basin), including a portion of the lake itself. Across the Sierra crest to the west lies the majority of the county, referred to as the "western slope." A portion of Folsom Lake is in the northwest corner of the county.

Much of the county is public land. The Eldorado National Forest comprises a significant portion (approximately 43%) of the county's land area, primarily on the western slope. The Lake Tahoe Basin Management Unit, formerly part of the Eldorado and two other National Forests, manages much of the land east of the crest. The Pacific Crest Trail runs through the eastern part of the county, along or roughly paralleling the Sierra crest. The county is home to the Desolation Wilderness, a popular destination for hiking, backpacking, and fishing.

=== Adjacent counties ===
- Placer County – north
- Douglas County, Nevada – northeast
- Alpine County – southeast
- Amador County – south
- Sacramento County – southwest

=== Geographic features ===
- American River
- Carson Range
- Crystal Range
- Echo Lake
- Fallen Leaf Lake
- Folsom Lake
- Francis Lake
- Freel Peak as its highest point at 10,886 feet (3,318 m)
- Gilmore Lake
- Green Springs Ranch
- Lake Tahoe
- Loon Lake
- Lost Lake
- Mount Price
- Mount Tallac
- Pyramid Lake
- Sierra Nevada
- Silver Peak
- Talking Mountain
- Union Valley Reservoir
- Waca Lake

== Recreation ==
=== Local landmarks ===
- Fountain-Tallman Soda Works
- John Pearson Soda Works
- Combellack-Blair House
- Rubicon Point Light

=== Parks ===
- D. L. Bliss State Park
- Desolation Wilderness
- Eagle Falls trailhead
- Eldorado National Forest
- Emerald Bay State Park
- Folsom Lake State Recreation Area
- Glen Alpine Springs trailhead
- Marshall Gold Discovery State Historic Park
- Pine Hill Ecological Reserve
- Tahoe National Forest

=== Skiing ===
- Heavenly Ski Resort
- Sierra-At-Tahoe Ski Resort

=== Racing ===
- Placerville Speedway

=== Wineries ===
- California Shenandoah Valley AVA
- El Dorado AVA
- Fair Play AVA
- Sierra Foothills AVA

== Demographics ==
The vast majority of the population lives in a narrow strip along U.S. Route 50, with the majority living between El Dorado Hills and Pollock Pines. The remainder resides in the South Lake Tahoe area, and in various dispersed rural communities.

Historical population
Census	Pop.	Note	%±
1850	20,057		—
1860	20,562		2.5%
1870	10,309		−49.9%
1880	10,683		3.6%
1890	9,232		−13.6%
1900	8,986		−2.7%
1910	7,492		−16.6%
1920	6,426		−14.2%
1930	8,325		29.6%
1940	13,229		58.9%
1950	16,207		22.5%
1960	29,390		81.3%
1970	43,833		49.1%
1980	85,812		95.8%
1990	125,955		46.8%
2000	156,299		24.1%
2010	181,058		15.8%
2020	191,185		5.6%
2025 (est.)	192,323	▲	0.6%
U.S. Decennial Census; 1790–1960 1900–1990; 1990–2000 2010 2020

=== 2020 census ===
As of the 2020 census, the county had a population of 191,185. The median age was 46.3 years. 20.5% of residents were under the age of 18 and 22.3% of residents were 65 years of age or older. For every 100 females there were 98.4 males, and for every 100 females age 18 and over there were 96.7 males age 18 and over.

The racial makeup of the county was 76.7% White, 0.8% Black or African American, 1.0% American Indian and Alaska Native, 4.8% Asian, 0.2% Native Hawaiian and Pacific Islander, 5.0% from some other race, and 11.5% from two or more races. Hispanic or Latino residents of any race comprised 13.8% of the population.

63.3% of residents lived in urban areas, while 36.7% lived in rural areas.

There were 75,320 households in the county, of which 27.9% had children under the age of 18 living with them and 21.7% had a female householder with no spouse or partner present. About 23.3% of all households were made up of individuals and 11.9% had someone living alone who was 65 years of age or older.

There were 93,467 housing units, of which 19.4% were vacant. Among occupied housing units, 74.9% were owner-occupied and 25.1% were renter-occupied. The homeowner vacancy rate was 1.4% and the rental vacancy rate was 6.9%.

=== Racial and ethnic composition ===
El Dorado County, California – Racial and ethnic composition Note: the US Census treats Hispanic/Latino as an ethnic category. This table excludes Latinos from the racial categories and assigns them to a separate category. Hispanics/Latinos may be of any race.
Race / Ethnicity (NH = Non-Hispanic)	Pop 1980	Pop 1990	Pop 2000	Pop 2010	Pop 2020	% 1980	% 1990	% 2000	% 2010	% 2020
White alone (NH)	79,692	113,053	132,725	144,689	140,141	92.87%	89.73%	84.92%	79.91%	73.30%
Black or African American alone (NH)	289	579	745	1,296	1,436	0.34%	0.46%	0.48%	0.72%	0.75%
Native American or Alaska Native alone (NH)	739	1,204	1,272	1,553	1,273	0.86%	0.96%	0.81%	0.86%	0.67%
Asian alone (NH)	1,011	2,318	3,250	6,143	9,024	1.18%	1.84%	2.08%	3.39%	4.72%
Native Hawaiian or Pacific Islander alone (NH)	x	x	169	261	276	0.11%	0.14%	0.11%	0.14%	0.14%
Other race alone (NH)	110	64	237	318	1,215	0.13%	0.05%	0.15%	0.18%	0.64%
Mixed race or Multiracial (NH)	x	x	3,335	4,923	11,361	x	x	2.13%	2.72%	5.94%
Hispanic or Latino (any race)	3,971	8,777	14,566	21,875	26,459	4.63%	6.97%	9.32%	12.08%	13.84%
Total	85,812	125,995	156,299	181,058	191,185	100.00%	100.00%	100.00%	100.00%	100.00%

=== American Community Survey 2025 data ===
The United States Census Bureau estimated that in 2025, El Dorado County’s population was 192.323. It was also estimated that the county's population was 72,18% Non-Hispanic White, 15,51% Hispanic or Latino, 0,89% Non-Hispanic Black, 5,60% Asian, 0,64% Native American, 0,18% Pacific Islander, and 5,01% Multiracial.

Total	Population	Percentage
Non-Hispanic White	138.813	72,18%
Hispanic or Latino	29.829	15,51%
Non-Hispanic Black	1.717	0,89%
Asian	10.777	5,60%
Native American	1.222	0,64%
Pacific Islander	338	0,18%
Non-Hispanic Multiracial	9.627	5,01%

=== 2010 Census ===
The 2010 United States census reported that El Dorado County had a population of 181,058. The racial makeup of El Dorado County was 156,793 (86.6%) White, 1,409 (0.8%) African American, 2,070 (1.1%) Native American, 6,297 (3.5%) Asian, 294 (0.2%) Pacific Islander, 7,278 (4.0%) from other races, and 6,917 (3.8%) from two or more races. Hispanic or Latino of any race were 21,875 persons (12.1%). The largest growth in the county has come in El Dorado Hills where the population grew by 24,092 residents to a total of 42,108 since 2000.

Population reported at 2010 United States census
The County	Total; Population	White	African; American	Native; American	Asian	Pacific; Islander	other races	two or more races	Hispanic or Latino (of any race)
El Dorado County	181,058	156,793	1,409	2,070	6,297	294	7,278	6,917	21,875
Incorporated cities	Total; Population	White	African; American	Native; American	Asian	Pacific; Islander	other races	two or more races	Hispanic or Latino (of any race)
Placerville	10,389	8,716	80	162	98	13	867	453	1,863
South Lake Tahoe	21,403	15,733	182	232	1,186	39	3,230	801	6,665
Census-designated places	Total; Population	White	African; American	Native; American	Asian	Pacific; Islander	other races	two or more races	Hispanic or Latino (of any race)
Auburn Lake Trails	3,426	3,190	6	28	36	5	45	116	208
Cameron Park	18,228	16,242	143	194	425	36	461	727	2,056
Camino	1,750	1,604	7	14	18	4	55	48	197
Cold Springs	446	413	4	5	3	0	15	6	43
Coloma	529	462	4	3	8	0	15	37	63
Diamond Springs	11,037	9,743	39	176	110	6	518	445	1,377
El Dorado Hills	42,108	35,089	615	196	3,563	71	681	1,893	3,802
Georgetown	2,367	2,128	47	59	18	2	45	68	177
Grizzly Flats	1,066	954	6	14	7	2	19	64	96
Pollock Pines	6,871	6,195	18	128	56	3	251	220	713
Shingle Springs	4,432	3,919	14	108	50	3	132	206	469
Tahoma‡	780	736	2	7	7	0	11	17	35
Other unincorporated areas	Total; Population	White	African; American	Native; American	Asian	Pacific; Islander	other races	two or more races	Hispanic or Latino (of any race)
All others not CDPs (combined)	56,226	51,669	242	744	712	110	933	1,816	4,111
‡ Note: these numbers reflect only the portion of this CDP in El Dorado County

=== 2000 census ===
As of the census of 2000, there were 156,299 people, 58,939 households, and 43,025 families residing in the county. The population density was 91 inhabitants per square mile (35/km^{2}). There were 71,278 housing units at an average density of 42 per square mile (16/km^{2}). The racial makeup of the county was 89.7% White, 0.5% Black or African American, 1.0% Native American, 2.1% Asian, 0.1% Pacific Islander, 3.6% from other races, and 3.0% from two or more races. 9.3% of the population were Hispanic or Latino of any race. 14.9% were of German, 13.4% English, 10.3% Irish, 6.6% Italian and 6.6% American ancestry according to Census 2000. 90.5% spoke English and 6.5% Spanish as their first language.

There were 58,939 households, out of which 34.2% had youngsters under the age of 18 living with them, 60.1% were married couples living together, 8.9% had a female householder with no husband present, and 27.0% were non-families. 20.1% of all households were made up of individuals, and 7.3% had someone living alone who was 65 years of age or older. The average household size was 2.63 and the average family size was 3.04.

In the county, the population was spread out, with 26.1% under the age of 18, 6.8% from 18 to 24, 27.8% from 25 to 44, 26.9% from 45 to 64, and 12.4% who were 65 years of age or older. The median age was 39 years. For every 100 females, there were 99.5 males. For every 100 females age 18 and over, there were 97.3 males.

The 2000 census also states that the median income for a household in the county was $51,484, and the median income for a family was $60,250. Males had a median income of $46,373 versus $31,537 for females. The per capita income for the county was $25,560. About 5.0% of families and 7.1% of the population were below the poverty line, including 7.6% of those under age 18 and 5.0% of those age 65 or over.

== Politics ==
=== Voter registration statistics ===
Population and registered voters
Total population	191,185	
Registered voters (Note: Percentage of registered voters with respect to total population. Percentages of party members with respect to registered voters follow.)	135,300	70.77%
Democratic	41,030	30.33%
Republican	56,812	41.99%
Democratic–Republican spread	-15,782	-11.66%
American Independent	7,780	5.75%
Green	633	0.47%
Libertarian	2,672	1.97%
Peace and Freedom	442	0.33%
Unknown	7	0.01%
Other	1,157	0.86%
No party preference	24,767	18.31%

==== Cities by population and voter registration ====
Cities by population and voter registration
City	Population	Registered voters	Democratic	Republican	D–R spread	Third parties, Unknown, Other	No party preference
Placerville	10,747	6,381	2,284	2,353	-1.08%	604	1,140
South Lake Tahoe	21,330	12,111	5,228	2,694	+20.92%	1,306	2,883
Unincorporated Areas	159,108	116,808	33,518	51,765	-15.62%	10,781	20,744

=== Overview ===
El Dorado is a predominantly Republican county in presidential and congressional elections. However, from 1880 until 1952, the county was a Democratic stronghold, with Theodore Roosevelt and Warren Harding being the only two Republicans to carry the county. Since 1952, however, El Dorado has gone Democratic only three times: in 1960 narrowly for John F. Kennedy, in 1964 in a landslide for Lyndon Johnson, and in 1976 narrowly for Jimmy Carter.

United States presidential election results for El Dorado County, California
Year	Republican		Democratic		Third party(ies)	
Year	No.	%	No.	%	No.	%
1880	1,419	47.89%	1,520	51.30%	24	0.81%
1884	1,289	45.47%	1,469	51.82%	77	2.72%
1888	1,350	47.02%	1,456	50.71%	65	2.26%
1892	1,159	43.80%	1,270	48.00%	217	8.20%
1896	1,130	39.54%	1,674	58.57%	54	1.89%
1900	1,193	45.14%	1,406	53.20%	44	1.66%
1904	1,248	54.10%	865	37.49%	194	8.41%
1908	986	44.74%	1,019	46.23%	199	9.03%
1912	16	0.59%	1,613	59.04%	1,103	40.37%
1916	1,068	35.10%	1,755	57.67%	220	7.23%
1920	1,636	64.36%	726	28.56%	180	7.08%
1924	852	28.49%	361	12.07%	1,778	59.45%
1928	1,228	44.25%	1,516	54.63%	31	1.12%
1932	956	23.12%	3,034	73.37%	145	3.51%
1936	1,228	23.12%	4,019	75.66%	65	1.22%
1940	2,019	32.37%	4,144	66.44%	74	1.19%
1944	1,990	39.55%	3,016	59.95%	25	0.50%
1948	2,894	43.04%	3,493	51.95%	337	5.01%
1952	5,203	60.51%	3,297	38.35%	98	1.14%
1956	4,613	53.60%	3,957	45.97%	37	0.43%
1960	6,065	49.16%	6,175	50.05%	97	0.79%
1964	5,775	39.53%	8,810	60.30%	25	0.17%
1968	7,468	49.00%	6,054	39.72%	1,719	11.28%
1972	11,330	54.20%	8,654	41.40%	921	4.41%
1976	12,472	47.69%	12,763	48.80%	919	3.51%
1980	21,238	58.27%	10,765	29.53%	4,446	12.20%
1984	27,583	64.93%	14,312	33.69%	583	1.37%
1988	30,021	59.33%	19,801	39.13%	781	1.54%
1992	25,906	39.92%	21,012	32.38%	17,969	27.69%
1996	32,759	51.84%	22,957	36.33%	7,480	11.84%
2000	42,045	58.29%	26,220	36.35%	3,871	5.37%
2004	52,878	61.23%	32,242	37.33%	1,244	1.44%
2008	50,314	54.14%	40,529	43.61%	2,083	2.24%
2012	50,973	57.42%	35,166	39.61%	2,635	2.97%
2016	49,247	52.62%	36,404	38.90%	7,940	8.48%
2020	61,838	53.24%	51,621	44.44%	2,700	2.32%
2024	61,109	54.61%	47,703	42.63%	3,096	2.77%

The county is noted as a center of political concern with the United Nations non-binding sustainable development plan Agenda 21, which was on the County Board of Supervisors meeting Agenda on May 15, 2012. Concerns included the threat of U.S. Forest Service road closures and traffic roundabouts. On February 19, 2013, 14 members of the El Dorado County Grand Jury resigned, forcing Supervising Judge Steven Bailey to dissolve it.

El Dorado County has a secessionist movement, calling for the county of less than 200,000 residents to become a new state of the union. Wyoming, the least populous current state, has approximately three times the number of residents. Sharon Durst, one of the leaders of the movement, was previously a supporter of the State of Jefferson movement, that advocates for Northern California counties and Southern Oregon counties to form a new state. El Dorado County's seat, Placerville, is located 45 miles from Sacramento, the state's capital. The leadership of the movement acknowledges that it is unlikely that the California legislature would approve their separation from the state, as required by the United States Constitution. They promote an unproven theory that the county "is technically not a legitimate piece of California and is instead 'other property' of Congress".

El Dorado County is split between two Congressional districts, with the western third of the County in the 5th Congressional District, represented by Tom McClintock, and the eastern two-thirds in the 3rd Congressional District, represented by Kevin Kiley. In the State Assembly, the county is split between the 1st Assembly district, represented by Republican Heather Hadwick and the 5th Assembly district, represented by Republican Joe Patterson. In the State Senate, it is in the 4th senatorial district, represented by Republican Marie Alvarado-Gil.

== Crime ==
The following table includes the number of incidents reported and the rate per 1,000 persons for each type of offense.

Population and crime rates
Population	179,878	
Violent crime	520	2.89
Homicide	3	0.02
Forcible rape	50	0.28
Robbery	71	0.39
Aggravated assault	396	2.20
Property crime	1,736	9.65
Burglary	932	5.18
Larceny-theft	1,540	8.56
Motor vehicle theft	178	0.99
Arson	17	0.09

=== Cities by population and crime rates ===
Cities by population and crime rates
City	Population	Violent crimes	Violent crime rate per 1,000 persons	Property crimes	Property crime rate per 1,000 persons
Placerville	10,479	55	5.25	194	18.51
South Lake Tahoe	21,586	148	6.86	544	25.20

== Transportation ==
=== Major highways ===
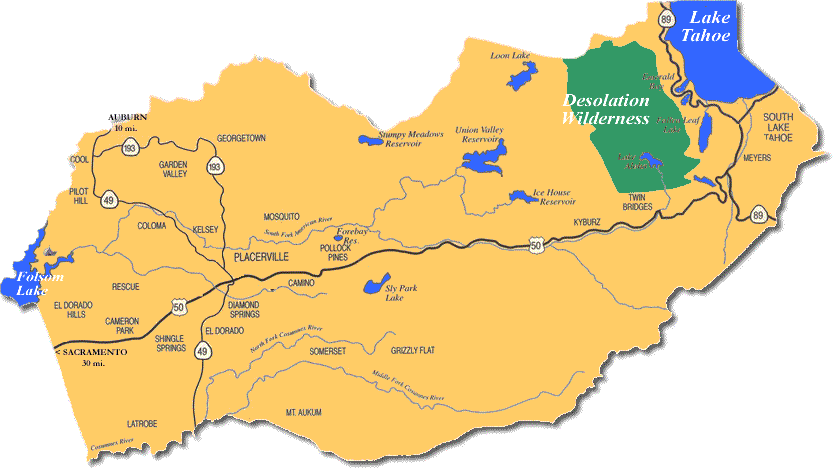
Map of El Dorado County in Northern California

- US 50
- SR 49
- SR 88
- SR 89
- SR 153
- SR 193

=== Public transportation ===
- El Dorado Transit runs local service in Placerville and surrounding areas (as far east as Pollock Pines). Commuter service into Sacramento and Folsom is also provided.
- Tahoe Transportation District is the transit operator for the South Lake Tahoe area. Service also runs into the state of Nevada.

=== Airports ===
General aviation airports include Placerville Airport, Georgetown Airport, Cameron Park airport and Lake Tahoe Airport.

== Asbestos ==
Portions of El Dorado County are known to contain natural asbestos formations near the surface. The USGS studied amphiboles in rock and soil in the area in response to an EPA sampling study and subsequent criticism of the EPA study. The study found that many amphibole particles in the area meet the counting rule criteria used by the EPA for chemical and morphological limits, but do not meet morphological requirements for commercial-grade-asbestos. The executive summary pointed out that even particles that do not meet requirements for commercial-grade-asbestos may be a health threat and suggested a collaborative research effort to assess health risks associated with naturally occurring asbestos.

In 2003, after construction of the Oak Ridge High School (El Dorado Hills) soccer field, the federal Agency for Toxic Substances and Disease Registry found that some student athletes, coaches and school workers had received substantial exposures. The inside of the school needed to be cleaned of dust.

== Sister city ==
- Warabi, Saitama Prefecture, Japan is a sister city to El Dorado County, California on March 26, 1975.

== Communities ==
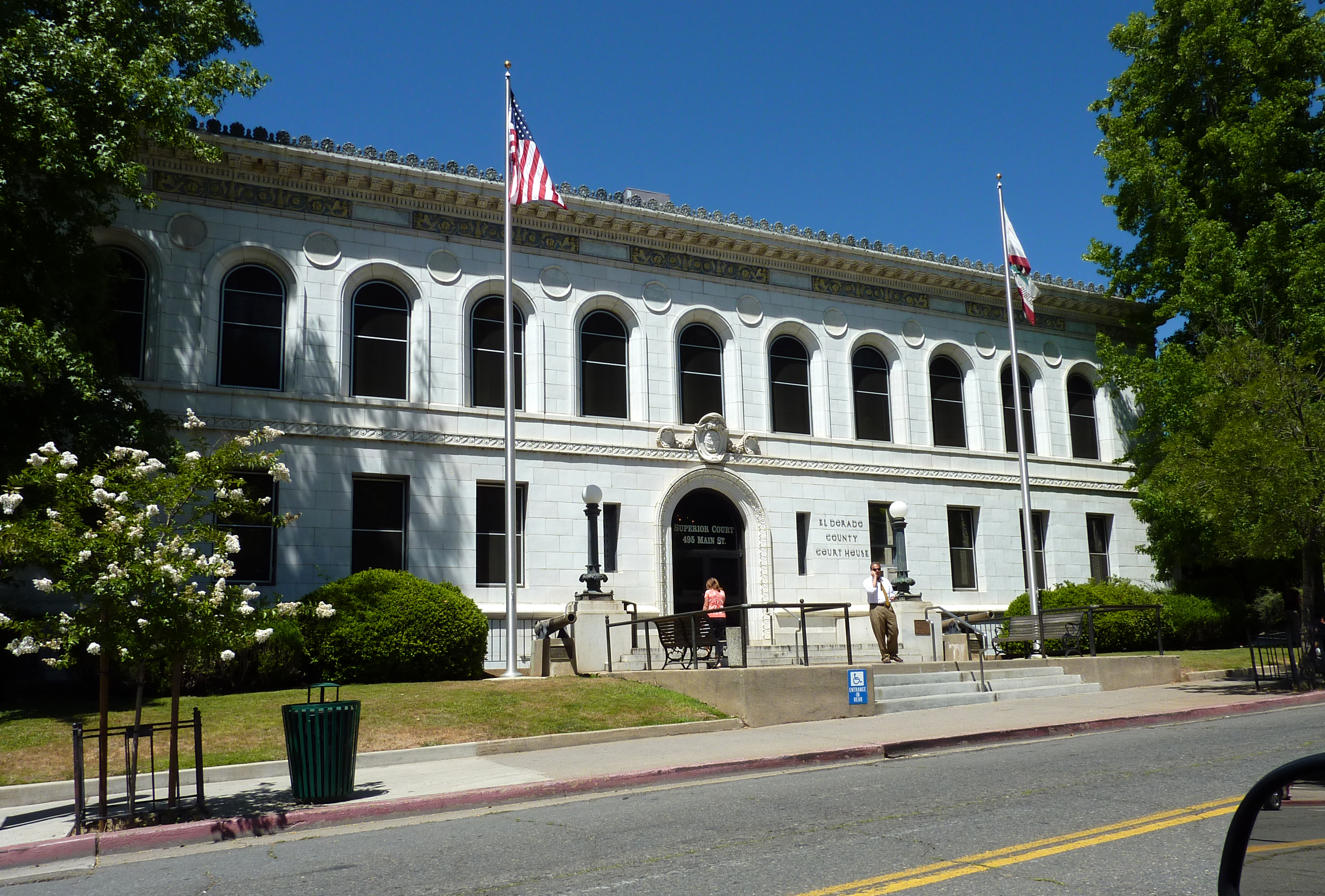
El Dorado County Courthouse in Placerville

=== Cities ===
- Placerville (county seat)
- South Lake Tahoe

=== Census-designated places ===
- Auburn Lake Trails
- Cameron Park
- Camino
- Cold Springs
- Coloma
- Diamond Springs
- El Dorado Hills
- Georgetown
- Grizzly Flats
- Meyers
- Pollock Pines
- Shingle Springs
- Tahoma

=== Other unincorporated communities ===
- Camp Richardson
- Camp Sacramento
- Cool
- Echo Lake
- El Dorado
- Fair Play
- Garden Valley
- Greenwood
- Happy Valley
- Kyburz
- Omo Ranch
- Outingdale
- Phillips
- Pilot Hill
- Rescue
- Somerset
- Strawberry
- Twin Bridges

=== Population ranking ===
The population ranking of the following table is based on the 2020 census of El Dorado County.

† county seat

Rank	City/town/etc.	Municipal type	Population (2020 Census)
1	El Dorado Hills	CDP	50,547
2	South Lake Tahoe	City	21,330
3	Cameron Park	CDP	18,881
4	Diamond Springs	CDP	11,345
5	† Placerville	City	10,747
6	Pollock Pines	CDP	7,112
7	Shingle Springs	CDP	4,660
8	Auburn Lake Trails	CDP	3,388
9	Georgetown	CDP	2,255
10	Camino	CDP	1,871
11	Grizzly Flats	CDP	1,093
12	Tahoma (partially in Placer County)	CDP	1,034
13	Cold Springs	CDP	556
14	Coloma	CDP	521
15	Shingle Springs Rancheria	AIAN	108

== Education ==
School districts include:

K-12:

- Black Oak Mine Unified School District
- Lake Tahoe Unified School District
- Tahoe-Truckee Unified School District

Secondary:

- El Dorado Union High School District

Elementary:

- Buckeye Union Elementary School District
- Camino Union Elementary School District
- Gold Oak Union Elementary School District
- Gold Trail Union Elementary School District
- Indian Diggings Elementary School District
- Latrobe Elementary School District
- Mother Lode Union Elementary School District
- Pioneer Union Elementary School District
- Placerville Union Elementary School District
- Pollock Pines Elementary School District
- Rescue Union Elementary School District
- Silver Fork Elementary School District

== See also ==
- Community Observatory
- James W. Marshall
- National Register of Historic Places listings in El Dorado County, California
