= Diamond Springs, California =

Diamond Springs
- Census-designated place
- Interactive map of Diamond Springs
- Location in the United States
- Coordinates: 38°41′41″N 120°48′54″W
- Country: United States
- State: California
- County: El Dorado

Area
  - Total: 16.71 sq mi (43.29 km^{2})
  - Land: 16.64 sq mi (43.10 km^{2})
  - Water: 0.073 sq mi (0.19 km^{2}) 0.42%
- Elevation: 1,791 ft (546 m)

Population (2020)
  - Total: 11,345
  - Density: 681.8/sq mi (263.24/km^{2})
- Time zone: UTC-8 (Pacific (PST))
  - Summer (DST): UTC-7 (PDT)
- ZIP code: 95619
- Area codes: 530, 837
- FIPS code: 06-19220
- GNIS feature ID: 0277499

California Historical Landmark
- Reference no.: 487

Diamond Springs (formerly, Diamond Spring and Diamond) is a census-designated place (CDP) in El Dorado County, California, United States. It is part of the Sacramento metropolitan area. The population was 11,345 at the 2020 census, up from 11,037 at the 2010 census. The town is registered as California Historical Landmark number 487. It lies at an elevation of 1791 feet (546 m).

== History ==
This town, settled in 1848, derived its name from its crystal clear springs. Among the most gold-rich locations in the region, the area produced a 25-pound nugget, one of the largest ever found in El Dorado County. Its most thriving period was in 1851 and, through its lumber, lime production, and agriculture, Diamond Springs has retained some of its early importance.

A post office was established at Diamond Spring in 1853; the name was changed to Diamond Springs in 1950.

== Geography ==
According to the United States Census Bureau, the CDP has a total area of 16.7 square miles (43 km^{2}), of which 16.6 square miles (43 km^{2}) is land and 0.1 square miles (0.26 km^{2}) (0.42%) is water.

== Demographics ==
Historical population
Census	Pop.	Note	%±
1980	2,287		—
1990	2,872		25.6%
2000	4,888		70.2%
2010	11,037		125.8%
2020	11,345		2.8%
U.S. Decennial Census; 1850–1870 1880-1890; 1900 1910 1920; 1930 1940 1950; 1960 1970 1980; 1990 2000 2010

Diamond Springs first appeared as a census designated place in the 1980 U.S. census.

=== Racial and ethnic composition ===
Diamond Springs CDP, California – Racial and ethnic composition Note: the US Census treats Hispanic/Latino as an ethnic category. This table excludes Latinos from the racial categories and assigns them to a separate category. Hispanics/Latinos may be of any race.
Race / Ethnicity (NH = Non-Hispanic)	Pop 2000	Pop 2010	Pop 2020	% 2000	% 2010	% 2020
White alone (NH)	4,260	9,025	8,603	87.15%	81.77%	75.83%
Black or African American alone (NH)	5	37	43	0.10%	0.34%	0.38%
Native American or Alaska Native alone (NH)	100	129	143	2.05%	1.17%	1.26%
Asian alone (NH)	24	108	99	0.49%	0.98%	0.87%
Native Hawaiian or Pacific Islander alone (NH)	2	6	5	0.04%	0.05%	0.04%
Other race alone (NH)	3	22	66	0.06%	0.20%	0.58%
Mixed race or Multiracial (NH)	78	333	611	1.60%	3.02%	5.39%
Hispanic or Latino (any race)	416	1,377	1,775	8.51%	12.48%	15.65%
Total	4,888	11,037	11,345	100.00%	100.00%	100.00%

=== 2020 census ===
As of the 2020 census, Diamond Springs had a population of 11,345 and a population density of 681.8 inhabitants per square mile (263.2/km^{2}). 80.4% of residents lived in urban areas, while 19.6% lived in rural areas. The census reported that 99.4% of the population lived in households, 0.3% lived in non-institutionalized group quarters, and 0.3% were institutionalized.

The median age was 49.8 years. 18.1% of residents were under the age of 18, 7.0% were aged 18 to 24, 20.1% were aged 25 to 44, 26.0% were aged 45 to 64, and 28.8% were 65 years of age or older. For every 100 females, there were 91.9 males, and for every 100 females age 18 and over there were 88.2 males age 18 and over.

There were 4,760 households, of which 22.8% had children under the age of 18 living in them. Of all households, 47.8% were married-couple households, 16.5% were households with a male householder and no spouse or partner present, and 30.3% were households with a female householder and no spouse or partner present. About 30.2% of all households were made up of individuals and 19.8% had someone living alone who was 65 years of age or older. The average household size was 2.37. There were 3,052 families (64.1% of all households).

There were 5,000 housing units at an average density of 300.5 units per square mile (116.0 units/km^{2}), of which 4,760 (95.2%) were occupied. Of these, 73.5% were owner-occupied, and 26.5% were occupied by renters. 4.8% of housing units were vacant, with a homeowner vacancy rate of 1.1% and a rental vacancy rate of 3.7%.

=== Demographic estimates ===
In 2023, the US Census Bureau estimated that 5.9% of the population were foreign-born. Of all people aged 5 or older, 91.3% spoke only English at home, 6.3% spoke Spanish, 1.6% spoke other Indo-European languages, 0.9% spoke Asian or Pacific Islander languages, and 0.0% spoke other languages. Of those aged 25 or older, 95.5% were high school graduates and 26.1% had a bachelor's degree.

=== Income and poverty ===
The median household income was $83,288, and the per capita income was $40,009. About 10.6% of families and 13.3% of the population were below the poverty line.

== Politics ==
In the state legislature, Diamond Springs is in the 4th senatorial district, represented by Republican Marie Alvarado-Gil, and the 5th Assembly district, represented by Republican Joe Patterson. Federally, Diamond Springs is in California's 5th congressional district, represented by Republican Tom McClintock.

== Education ==
At elementary level, the CDP is divided among three school districts: Mother Lode Union Elementary School District Gold Oak Union Elementary School District,, and Buckeye Union Elementary School District. All of the CDP is served by the El Dorado Union High School District.
