= Pollock Pines, California =

- Census-designated place
- Jenkinson Lake near Pollock Pines

- Location in El Dorado County and the state of California

- Location in the United States
- Coordinates: 38°45′41″N 120°35′12″W
- Country: United States
- State: California
- County: El Dorado

Area
  - Total: 8.656 sq mi (22.419 km^{2})
  - Land: 8.624 sq mi (22.336 km^{2})
  - Water: 0.032 sq mi (0.083 km^{2}) 0.4%
- Elevation: 3,980 ft (1,213 m)

Population (2020)
  - Total: 7,112
  - Density: 824.7/sq mi (318.4/km^{2})
- Time zone: UTC-8 (Pacific (PST))
  - Summer (DST): UTC-7 (PDT)
- ZIP code: 95726
- Area codes: 530, 837
- FIPS code: 06-58030
- GNIS feature ID: 1659419

Pollock Pines is a census-designated place (CDP) in El Dorado County, California, United States. It is part of the Sacramento metropolitan area. Pollock Pines lies at an elevation of 3,980 feet (1,210 m) in the Sierra Nevada. The population was 7,112 at the 2020 census, up from 6,871 at the 2010 census.

== Geography ==
Pollock Pines receives annual snowfall between 6 inches (150 mm) and 6 feet (1.8 m). The town sits on the western slope of the Sierra Nevada. According to the United States Census Bureau, the CDP has a total area of 8.7 square miles (23 km^{2}), over 99% land.

For the 2000 census, the CDP had a total area of 5.8 square miles (15 km^{2}), all land.

The area encompassing Pollock Pines is in a heavily timbered mountain region situated along the ridgetop on the southern side of the South Fork of the American River. It is considered a "very high fire hazard severity zone", although it received grants from the state's cap and trade carbon trading program to trim vegetation on the ridgeline south of Highway 50.

It is approximately 13 miles (21 km) east of Placerville and 58 miles (93 km) east of Sacramento on U.S. Highway 50.

=== Climate ===
According to the Köppen Climate Classification system, Pollock Pines has a warm-summer Mediterranean climate, abbreviated "Csa" on climate maps.

Climate data for Pollock Pines, California
Month	Jan	Feb	Mar	Apr	May	Jun	Jul	Aug	Sep	Oct	Nov	Dec	Year
Record high °F (°C)	73 (23)	78 (26)	82 (28)	90 (32)	95 (35)	100 (38)	103 (39)	105 (41)	103 (39)	97 (36)	84 (29)	80 (27)	105 (41)
Mean daily maximum °F (°C)	50.6 (10.3)	49.9 (9.9)	54.7 (12.6)	60.3 (15.7)	69.5 (20.8)	80.0 (26.7)	88.7 (31.5)	88.5 (31.4)	82.0 (27.8)	70.7 (21.5)	56.5 (13.6)	49.8 (9.9)	66.8 (19.3)
Mean daily minimum °F (°C)	34.3 (1.3)	34.0 (1.1)	35.5 (1.9)	38.4 (3.6)	45.0 (7.2)	53.0 (11.7)	60.3 (15.7)	60.3 (15.7)	56.2 (13.4)	47.7 (8.7)	39.6 (4.2)	34.4 (1.3)	44.9 (7.2)
Record low °F (°C)	10 (−12)	12 (−11)	14 (−10)	18 (−8)	27 (−3)	34 (1)	41 (5)	40 (4)	33 (1)	22 (−6)	12 (−11)	5 (−15)	5 (−15)
Average precipitation inches (mm)	9.27 (235)	7.96 (202)	7.94 (202)	4.50 (114)	3.10 (79)	0.70 (18)	0.08 (2.0)	0.10 (2.5)	0.40 (10)	2.71 (69)	4.52 (115)	7.30 (185)	48.58 (1,233.5)
Average snowfall inches (cm)	15.4 (39)	13.6 (35)	13.6 (35)	7.1 (18)	0.6 (1.5)	0.0 (0.0)	0.0 (0.0)	0.0 (0.0)	0.0 (0.0)	0.0 (0.0)	2.4 (6.1)	10.7 (27)	63.4 (161.6)
Average precipitation days (≥ 0.01 in)	12.1	11.6	11.6	9.2	6.9	2.9	0.5	0.7	2.0	5.0	9.5	12.2	84.2
Average snowy days	3.8	3.6	3.1	2.0	0.1	0.0	0.0	0.0	0.0	0.1	1.3	3.1	17.1
Source: NOAA

== History ==
One of the original Pony Express stations, Twelve Mile House, was located in Pollock Pines. The location was covered by the restaurant Sportsman's Hall. The "Hall", originally opened in 1852 by John and James Blair, who had emigrated from Scotland, still operates today. It is the site of California Registered Historical Landmark #704, which reads: "This was the site of Sportsman's Hall, also known as Twelve-Mile House, the hotel operated in the latter 1850s and 1860s by John and James Blair. A stopping place for stages and teams of the Comstock, it became a relay station of the Central Overland Pony Express. Here, at 7:40 A.M., April 4, 1860, pony rider William (Sam) Hamilton riding in from Placerville, handed the express mail to Warren Upson, who, two minutes later, sped on his way eastward."

Pollock Pines was primarily a lumber community. The name stems from an early land developer, Hiram Robert (H.R.) Pollock, who arrived with his wife Anna and son Claude Earl around 1909. A lumberman by trade, he borrowed money and built a saw mill. When the mill was destroyed by fire in the early 1930s, Hiram and Anna Pollock started selling lots in a subdivision they created out of a piece of land that lay along the ridge, on both sides of Cedar Grove School, and thus gave the town its name.

The Pollock Pines Post Office was established on Apr. 28, 1936, at what is currently 6401A Pony Express Trail, Pollock Pines (originally Hwy 50) with Mrs. Alice P. Grout serving as the first postmaster. The post office was later relocated, and now operates at 2669 Sanders Dr.

The first Pollock Pines store was built on the current location (6401 Pony Express Trail) in the 1930s by Newt Grout. The building included a grocery store, one gas pump, a post office, and a home upstairs. The restaurant "Frenchy's" was run next door by Mr. and Mrs. Ted Lang. They bought the liquor license of the Lucky Dime and added a bar. In 1943, the restaurant was renamed to "50 Grand" for its proximity to U.S. Highway 50. It burned down in 1983, operated down the road for one year, then reopened in 1984 back in its original location. The restaurant has been in continual operation as 50 Grand since the rebranding, celebrating its 80th anniversary in November 2023.

In 2014 the King Fire burned 97,717 acres (39,545 ha) in the Eldorado National Forest and on private land, destroying 80 structures, including residences and outbuildings near Pollock Pines. The cause of the fire, which was started September 13 and was extinguished October 9, was determined to be arson. The fire threatened thousands of homes as well as reservoirs that provide water and electricity to portions of California. The fire and the post-burn area were extensively studied by NASA's wildfires program which collected data on pre-burn forest conditions, fuel moisture, fire behavior, burned area and severity, post-fire forest structure, erosion, re-vegetation, and targeted mitigation for the fire science and management communities.

The Caldor Fire started on August 14, 2021, near Little Mountain, south of Pollock Pines in El Dorado County, about two miles east of Omo Ranch and four miles south of Grizzly Flats. It was a large wildfire that burned 221,835 acres (89,773 hectares) in the Eldorado National Forest and other areas of the Sierra Nevada in El Dorado, Amador, and Alpine County, California, in the United States during the 2021 California wildfire season. It was fully contained on Thursday, October 21, 2021. The Caldor Fire destroyed 1,005 structures and damaged 81 more, primarily in the U.S. Highway 50 corridor. Pollock Pines was spared from any structural damage caused during the Caldor fire, but numerous recreation areas along the nearby Mormon Emigrant Trail were damaged by the fire.

== Demographics ==
Historical population
Census	Pop.	Note	%±
1980	1,941		—
1990	4,291		121.1%
2000	4,728		10.2%
2010	6,871		45.3%
2020	7,112		3.5%
U.S. Decennial Census; 1850–1870 1880-1890; 1900 1910 1920; 1930 1940 1950; 1960 1970 1980; 1990 2000 2010

Pollock Pines first appeared as a census designated place in the 1980 U.S. census.

=== Racial and ethnic composition ===
Pollock Pines CDP, California – Racial and ethnic composition Note: the US Census treats Hispanic/Latino as an ethnic category. This table excludes Latinos from the racial categories and assigns them to a separate category. Hispanics/Latinos may be of any race.
Race / Ethnicity (NH = Non-Hispanic)	Pop 2000	Pop 2010	Pop 2020	% 2000	% 2010	% 2020
White alone (NH)	4,266	5,798	5,291	90.23%	84.38%	74.40%
Black or African American alone (NH)	1	11	42	0.02%	0.16%	0.59%
Native American or Alaska Native alone (NH)	52	100	61	1.10%	1.46%	0.86%
Asian alone (NH)	33	54	107	0.70%	0.79%	1.50%
Native Hawaiian or Pacific Islander alone (NH)	7	1	5	0.15%	0.01%	0.07%
Other race alone (NH)	2	16	41	0.04%	0.23%	0.58%
Mixed race or Multiracial (NH)	119	178	586	2.52%	2.59%	8.24%
Hispanic or Latino (any race)	248	713	979	5.25%	10.38%	13.77%
Total	4,728	6,871	7,112	100.00%	100.00%	100.00%

=== 2020 census ===
As of the 2020 census, Pollock Pines had a population of 7,112 and a population density of 824.7 inhabitants per square mile (318.4/km^{2}). The median age was 46.6 years; 19.7% of residents were under age 18, and 21.0% were age 65 or older. For every 100 females, there were 100.3 males, and for every 100 females age 18 and over, there were 100.1 males age 18 and over.

The census reported that 99.6% of the population lived in households, 0.4% lived in non-institutionalized group quarters, and no one was institutionalized. In addition, 0.0% of residents lived in urban areas and 100.0% lived in rural areas.

There were 2,962 households, of which 23.7% included children under age 18. Of all households, 49.1% were married-couple households, 8.4% were cohabiting-couple households, 21.6% had a female householder with no spouse or partner present, and 21.0% had a male householder with no spouse or partner present. About 28.3% of households were one person, including 12.1% with one person age 65 or older. The average household size was 2.39, and there were 1,907 families (64.4% of all households).

There were 3,435 housing units at an average density of 398.3 units per square mile (153.8 units/km^{2}), of which 86.2% were occupied and 13.8% were vacant. Of occupied units, 78.1% were owner-occupied and 21.9% were renter-occupied. The homeowner vacancy rate was 1.2%, and the rental vacancy rate was 8.3%.

=== Demographic estimates ===
In 2023, the US Census Bureau estimated that 7.4% of the population were foreign-born. Of all people aged 5 or older, 89.2% spoke only English at home, 9.1% spoke Spanish, 0.6% spoke other Indo-European languages, 1.1% spoke Asian or Pacific Islander languages, and 0.0% spoke other languages. Of those aged 25 or older, 88.0% were high school graduates and 21.5% had a bachelor's degree.

=== Income and poverty ===
The median household income in 2023 was $74,190, and the per capita income was $43,080. About 8.3% of families and 17.6% of the population were below the poverty line.

=== 2010 census ===
The 2010 United States census reported that Pollock Pines had a population of 6,871. The population density was 863.2 inhabitants per square mile (333.3/km^{2}). The racial makeup of Pollock Pines was 6,195 (90.2%) White, 18 (0.3%) African American, 128 (1.9%) Native American, 56 (0.8%) Asian, 3 (0.0%) Pacific Islander, 251 (3.7%) from other races, and 220 (3.2%) from two or more races. Hispanic or Latino of any race were 713 persons (10.4%).

The Census reported that 6,849 people (99.7% of the population) lived in households, 22 (0.3%) lived in non-institutionalized group quarters, and 0 (0%) were institutionalized.

There were 2,827 households, out of which 795 (28.1%) had children under the age of 18 living in them, 1,484 (52.5%) were opposite-sex married couples living together, 264 (9.3%) had a female householder with no husband present, 168 (5.9%) had a male householder with no wife present. There were 201 (7.1%) unmarried opposite-sex partnerships, and 25 (0.9%) same-sex married couples or partnerships. 733 households (25.9%) were made up of individuals, and 269 (9.5%) had someone living alone who was 65 years of age or older. The average household size was 2.42. There were 1,916 families (67.8% of all households); the average family size was 2.88.

The population was spread out, with 1,463 people (21.3%) under the age of 18, 484 people (7.0%) aged 18 to 24, 1,511 people (22.0%) aged 25 to 44, 2,285 people (33.3%) aged 45 to 64, and 1,128 people (16.4%) who were 65 years of age or older. The median age was 44.8 years. For every 100 females, there were 101.6 males. For every 100 females age 18 and over, there were 101.5 males.

There were 3,391 housing units at an average density of 426.0 per square mile (164.5/km^{2}), of which 2,827 were occupied, of which 2,119 (75.0%) were owner-occupied, and 708 (25.0%) were occupied by renters. The homeowner vacancy rate was 3.2%; the rental vacancy rate was 11.9%. 5,063 people (73.7% of the population) lived in owner-occupied housing units and 1,786 people (26.0%) lived in rental housing units.

== Politics ==
In the state legislature, Pollock Pines is in the 4th senatorial district, represented by Republican Marie Alvarado-Gil, and the 1st Assembly district, represented by Republican Heather Hadwick.

Federally, Pollock Pines is in California's 3rd congressional district, represented by Independent Kevin Kiley.

== Education ==
Most of the CDP is served by the Pollock Pines Elementary School District while a portion to the west is within the Camino Union Elementary School District. All of Pollock Pines is in the El Dorado Union High School District.
