= Cameron Park, California =

Cameron Park
- CDP
- Cameron Park, California
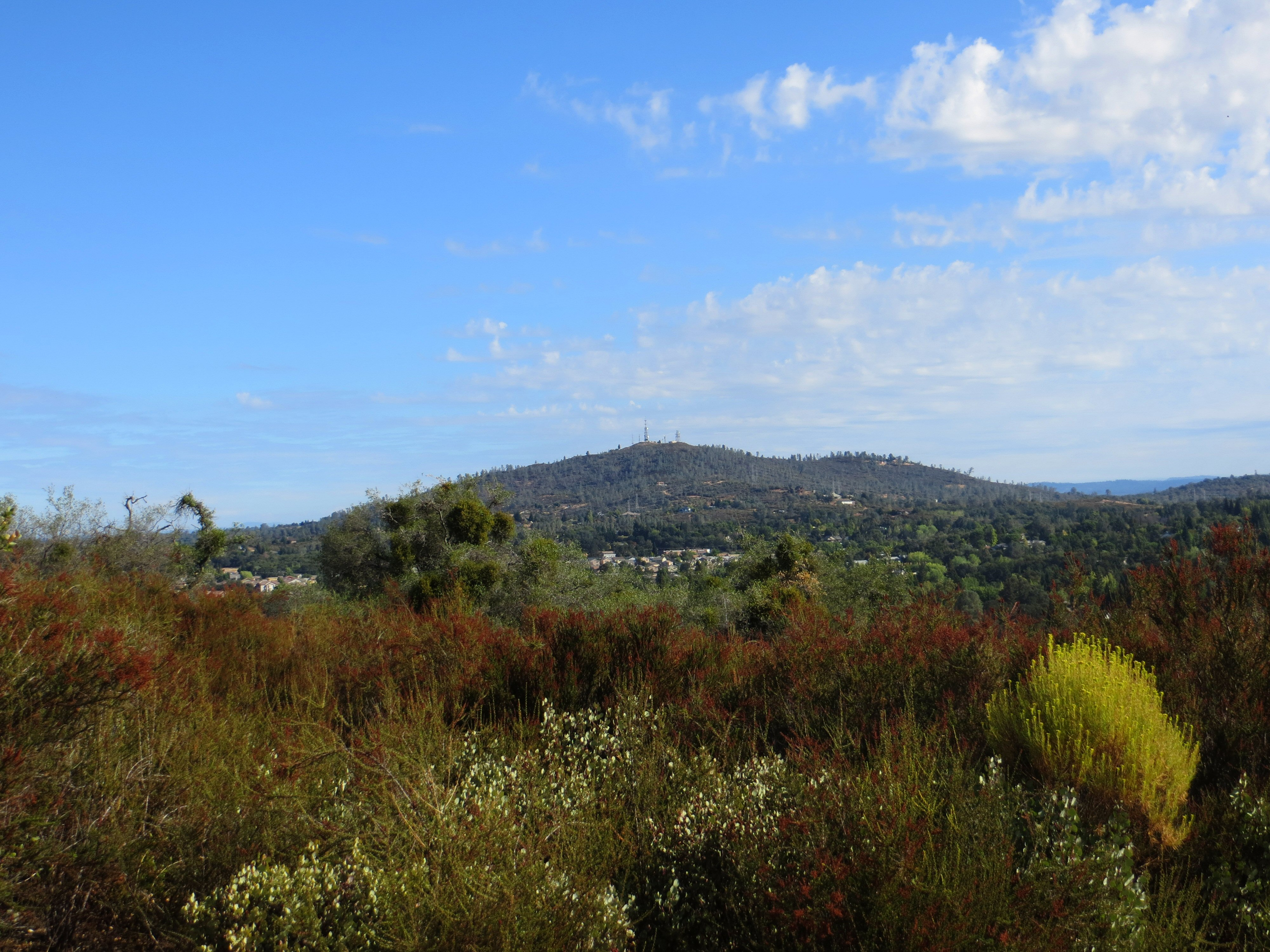
- Panoramic view of Cameron Park
- Interactive map of Cameron Park
- Location in the United States
- Coordinates: 38°40′08″N 120°59′14″W
- Country: United States
- State: California
- County: El Dorado

Government
  - Director: Ellie Wooten

Area
  - Total: 11.30 sq mi (29.26 km^{2})
  - Land: 11.23 sq mi (29.08 km^{2})
  - Water: 0.073 sq mi (0.19 km^{2}) 0.62%
- Elevation: 1,198 ft (365 m)

Population (2020)
  - Total: 18,881
  - Density: 1,681.7/sq mi (649.31/km^{2})
- Time zone: UTC-8 (Pacific (PST))
  - Summer (DST): UTC-7 (PDT)
- ZIP code: 95682
- Area codes: 530, 837
- FIPS code: 06-10256
- GNIS feature ID: 1733968

Cameron Park is a census-designated place (CDP) in El Dorado County, California, United States and is part of the Greater Sacramento Area. The population was 18,881 in the 2020 census, up from 18,228 in 2010. Cameron Park is a community located in the Northern California Gold Country of the Sierra Nevada foothills, approximately 30 miles (50 km) east of Sacramento and 70 miles (110 km) west of South Lake Tahoe via the main thoroughfare US Highway 50.

== History ==
The original Native American inhabitants of the area surrounding Cameron Park were Nisenan, or Southern Maidu Indians. Grinding rocks and burial mounds, still visible in various locations in and near the park, serve as glimpses into their past. But modern development accelerated in the area when Larry Cameron purchased 5,000 acres (2,000 ha) of foothill land in the 1950s for development purposes - first for ranching, then for housing, a golf course, parks, a lake and a small airport. In the years since, the land has slowly been sub-divided into parcels used for purposes varying from ranch-sized properties to medium- and high-density residential neighborhoods.

Today, Cameron Park contains a mix of ranches, single family homes, condominiums, apartments and businesses. As of the 2020 Census, the Cameron Park CDP had 7,610 housing units.

== Cameron Park Airpark ==
Cameron Park Airpark is a unique residential aviation community located within Cameron Park, California. Established in the 1960s as part of the town's original development plan, the Airpark was designed for aviation enthusiasts, featuring homes with direct access to the Cameron Park Airport via private taxiways. Residents can taxi their planes from backyard hangars straight to the 4,051-foot (1,235 m) paved runway (designated 13/31). The Airpark quickly became a defining feature of the community, blending suburban living with a love for flight. Over the years, it has remained active, housing over 100 based aircraft and supporting a tight-knit population of pilots and aviation families. The Airpark not only contributes to the town's identity but also draws attention for its distinctive layout, where streets double as taxiways and aviation is a part of everyday life.

== Geography and climate ==
According to the United States Census Bureau, the CDP has a total area of 11.2 square miles (29 km^{2}), of which 11.1 square miles (29 km^{2}) is land and 0.1 square miles (0.26 km^{2}) (0.62%) is water (Cameron Park Lake).

Cameron Park is situated in an interior chaparral zone or brush zone just east of the Central Valley. It is the closest population center to the Pine Hill Ecological Reserve. Native vegetation includes an abundance of redbud and manzanita bushes, and brush in general. Where treed the native trees are primarily gray pines, and oak trees with some small groves of ponderosa pines starting in the higher elevation zones. The elevation of Cameron Park varies between approximately 1,200 and 1,450 feet (370 and 440 m) above sea level, and is not considered in the snow zone of the Sierra Nevada mountains to the east, which are typically between 3,000 and 5,000 feet of elevation and above.

Summers are generally hot and dry, with average daytime temperatures in the 90 to 100 °F (32 to 38 °C) range, but sometimes reaching 110 °F (43 °C), or more. It can be very dry, with little effect of mountain thunderstorms or monsoonal flows that affect the south and interiors. Nights, however, tend to cool off more so than in the Sacramento Valley below, and temperatures in general range a few degrees below the eastern portion of the Central Valley because of the elevation difference. Autumns tend to be an "extended dry, hot summer" throughout California and Cameron Park is no exception. Winters are generally cool and rainy, with highs averaging 40 to 60 °F (4 to 16 °C) and nights occasionally dropping below freezing. Cameron Park typically receives exceptional snow events, about once every few years.

The soil in Cameron Park is reddish and clay-like and usually must be amended in order for many non-native ornamental plants to survive. The soil is derived from Gabbro type of volcanic bedrock and despite its clay-like composition it is good soil and rich in nutrients. Cameron Park is in Sunset Climate Zone 9 and USDA Plant Hardiness Zone 9A.

Climate data for Cameron Park (1198 ft elevation)
| Month | Jan | Feb | Mar | Apr | May | Jun | Jul | Aug | Sep | Oct | Nov | Dec | Year |
|---|---|---|---|---|---|---|---|---|---|---|---|---|---|
| Mean daily maximum °F (°C) | 55.0 (12.8) | 59 (15) | 63.0 (17.2) | 69.1 (20.6) | 77 (25) | 88 (31) | 93.7 (34.3) | 93.2 (34.0) | 88.0 (31.1) | 77 (25) | 64 (18) | 55 (13) | 73.5 (23.1) |
| Daily mean °F (°C) | 46.0 (7.8) | 48.9 (9.4) | 53.1 (11.7) | 57.0 (13.9) | 64.0 (17.8) | 71.1 (21.7) | 77 (25) | 75.99 (24.44) | 72.00 (22.22) | 63.0 (17.2) | 52.0 (11.1) | 46.0 (7.8) | 60.51 (15.84) |
| Mean daily minimum °F (°C) | 41 (5) | 43.0 (6.1) | 45.0 (7.2) | 48.0 (8.9) | 53.1 (11.7) | 60.1 (15.6) | 64.9 (18.3) | 64.0 (17.8) | 60.1 (15.6) | 54.0 (12.2) | 46.0 (7.8) | 41 (5) | 51.7 (10.9) |
Source: NOAA

== Demographics ==
Historical population
| Census | Pop. | Note | %± |
|---|---|---|---|
| 1980 | 5,607 | | — |
| 1990 | 11,897 | | 112.2% |
| 2000 | 14,549 | | 22.3% |
| 2010 | 18,228 | | 25.3% |
| 2020 | 18,881 | | 3.6% |
U.S. Decennial Census; 1850–1870 1880-1890; 1900 1910 1920; 1930 1940 1950; 1960 1970 1980; 1990 2000 2010

Cameron Park first appeared as a census designated place in the 1980 U.S. census.

=== Racial and ethnic composition ===
Cameron Park CDP, California – Racial and ethnic composition Note: the US Census treats Hispanic/Latino as an ethnic category. This table excludes Latinos from the racial categories and assigns them to a separate category. Hispanics/Latinos may be of any race.
| Race / Ethnicity (NH = Non-Hispanic) | Pop 2000 | Pop 2010 | Pop 2020 | % 2000 | % 2010 | % 2020 |
|---|---|---|---|---|---|---|
| White alone (NH) | 12,847 | 14,912 | 14,067 | 88.30% | 81.81% | 74.50% |
| Black or African American alone (NH) | 85 | 132 | 143 | 0.58% | 0.72% | 0.76% |
| Native American or Alaska Native alone (NH) | 110 | 149 | 120 | 0.76% | 0.82% | 0.64% |
| Asian alone (NH) | 200 | 415 | 442 | 1.37% | 2.28% | 2.34% |
| Native Hawaiian or Pacific Islander alone (NH) | 18 | 33 | 27 | 0.12% | 0.18% | 0.14% |
| Other race alone (NH) | 25 | 35 | 92 | 0.17% | 0.19% | 0.49% |
| Mixed race or Multiracial (NH) | 289 | 496 | 1,128 | 1.99% | 2.72% | 5.97% |
| Hispanic or Latino (any race) | 975 | 2,056 | 2,862 | 6.70% | 11.28% | 15.16% |
| Total | 14,549 | 18,228 | 18,881 | 100.00% | 100.00% | 100.00% |

=== 2020 census ===
As of the 2020 census, Cameron Park had a population of 18,881. The median age was 43.1 years. 21.9% of residents were under the age of 18 and 21.2% of residents were 65 years of age or older. For every 100 females there were 92.6 males, and for every 100 females age 18 and over there were 89.1 males age 18 and over.

94.5% of residents lived in urban areas, while 5.5% lived in rural areas.

There were 7,441 households in Cameron Park, of which 29.4% had children under the age of 18 living in them. Of all households, 52.9% were married-couple households, 14.4% were households with a male householder and no spouse or partner present, and 25.6% were households with a female householder and no spouse or partner present. About 23.2% of all households were made up of individuals and 12.4% had someone living alone who was 65 years of age or older.

There were 7,743 housing units, of which 3.9% were vacant. The homeowner vacancy rate was 1.1% and the rental vacancy rate was 5.0%.

Racial composition as of the 2020 census
| Race | Number | Percent |
|---|---|---|
| White | 14,914 | 79.0% |
| Black or African American | 154 | 0.8% |
| American Indian and Alaska Native | 196 | 1.0% |
| Asian | 477 | 2.5% |
| Native Hawaiian and Other Pacific Islander | 28 | 0.1% |
| Some other race | 846 | 4.5% |
| Two or more races | 2,266 | 12.0% |
| Hispanic or Latino (of any race) | 2,862 | 15.2% |

=== 2010 census ===
At the 2010 census Cameron Park had a population of 18,228. The population density was 1,631.0 inhabitants per square mile (629.7/km^{2}). The racial makeup of Cameron Park was 16,242 (89.1%) White, 143 (0.8%) African American, 194 (1.1%) Native American, 425 (2.3%) Asian, 36 (0.2%) Pacific Islander, 461 (2.5%) from other races, and 727 (4.0%) from two or more races. Hispanic or Latino of any race were 2,056 persons (11.3%).

The census reported that 18,222 people (100% of the population) lived in households, 6 (0%) lived in non-institutionalized group quarters, and no one was institutionalized. 2,512 (35.9%) households had children under the age of 18 living with them, 3,975 (56.8%) were opposite-sex married couples living together, 790 (11.3%) had a female householder with no husband present, 356 (5.1%) had a male householder with no wife present. There were 390 (5.6%) unmarried opposite-sex partnerships, and 41 (0.6%) same-sex married couples or partnerships. 1,465 households (20.9%) were one person and 622 (8.9%) had someone living alone who was 65 or older. The average household size was 2.61. There were 5,121 families (73.2% of households); the average family size was 3.00.

The age distribution was 4,576 people (25.1%) under the age of 18, 1,502 people (8.2%) aged 18 to 24, 4,162 people (22.8%) aged 25 to 44, 5,358 people (29.4%) aged 45 to 64, and 2,630 people (14.4%) who were 65 or older. The median age was 40.6 years. For every 100 females, there were 94.3 males. For every 100 females age 18 and over, there were 92.1 males.

There were 7,610 housing units at an average density of 680.9 units per square mile (262.9 units/km^{2}), of which 6,993 were occupied, 4,768 (68.2%) by the owners and 2,225 (31.8%) by renters. The homeowner vacancy rate was 2.0%; the rental vacancy rate was 14.6%. 12,566 people (68.9% of the population) lived in owner-occupied housing units and 5,656 people (31.0%) lived in rental housing units.

== Government ==
In the state legislature, Cameron Park is in the 4th senatorial district, represented by Republican Marie Alvarado-Gil, and the 5th Assembly district, represented by Republican Joe Patterson.

Federally, Cameron Park is in California's 5th congressional district, represented by Republican Tom McClintock.

Locally, a Community Services District (CSD), supported by an elected Board of Directors, provides many programs and services such as fire and emergency services, local administration, CC&R enforcement, recreational programs and parks and facilities management and upkeep.

== Transportation ==
El Dorado Transit provides local bus service, including the 50 Express bus to Iron Point Station.

Amtrak Thruway 20C provides a daily connection to Sacramento Valley Station to the west, and South Lake Tahoe to the east, with a few stops in between.

== Sites of interest ==
Cameron Airpark Estate's wide streets double as taxiways leading from the residences to the adjacent airport. Many homes have aircraft hangars (oversized garages) that house personal aircraft, allowing residents to commute from home to work entirely by air. The adjoining airport (Cameron Airpark, O61) is a public airport and of economic importance to the surrounding region.

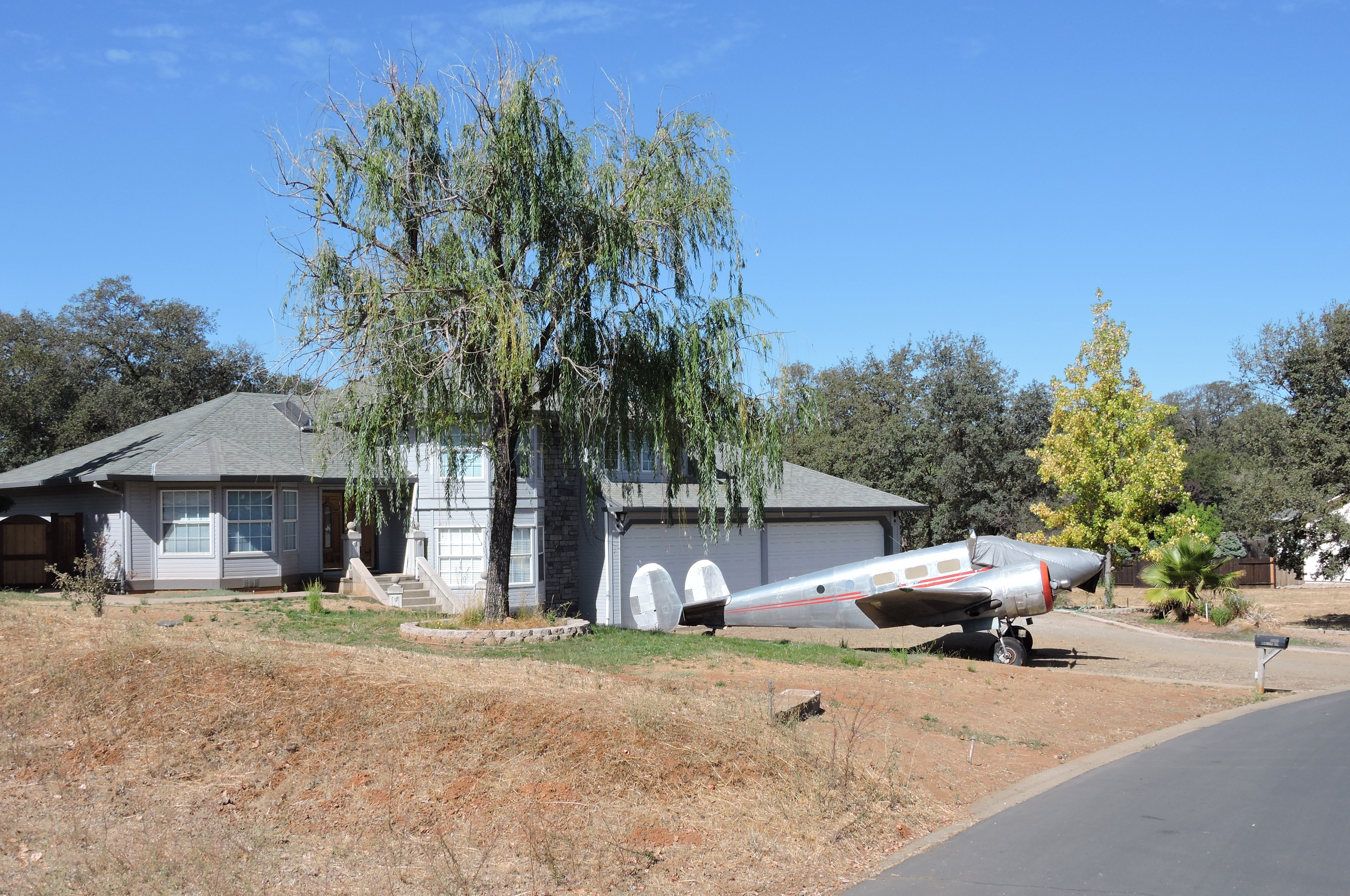
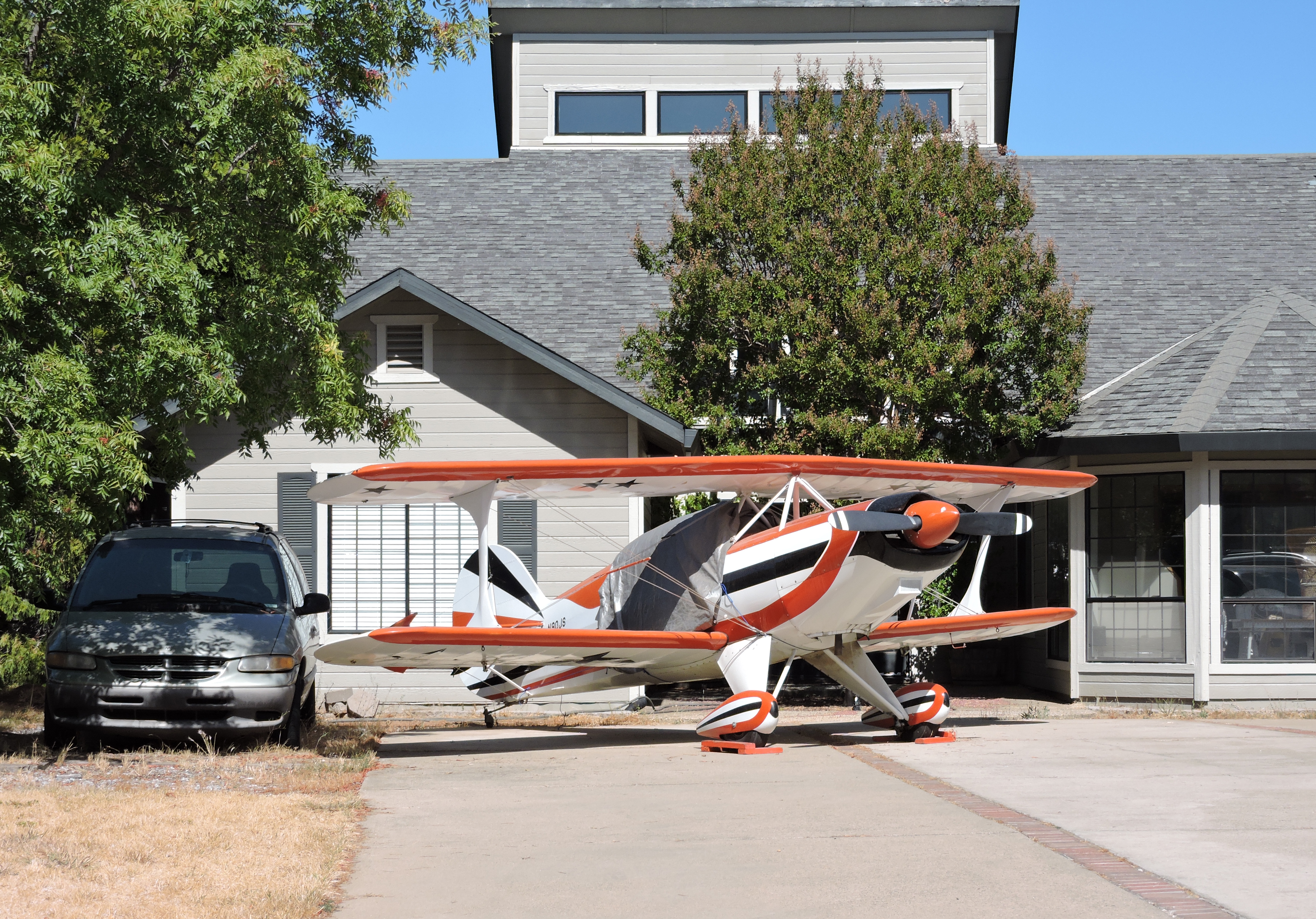
Airplanes in private driveways in Cameron Airpark Estates

Adjacent to the Airpark Estates sits man-made Cameron Park Lake. Covering approximately 10 acres (4 ha), the area contains a trail encircling the lake, picnic areas, boat rentals, tennis courts and playgrounds. Turtles and aquatic fowl can be seen at the lake, and the Community Services District regularly stocks the lake with fish including bluegill, black bass, and black crappie fish. Cameron Park Lake is also the site of the annual "Summer Spectacular" held on or about the Independence Day holiday. Since 1999 this event has provided entertainment, food, and a fireworks show to attendees. Cameron Park Lake is also the home of "Ribstock," a one-day barbecue festival that features a Kansas City Barbeque Society-sanctioned barbecue competition.

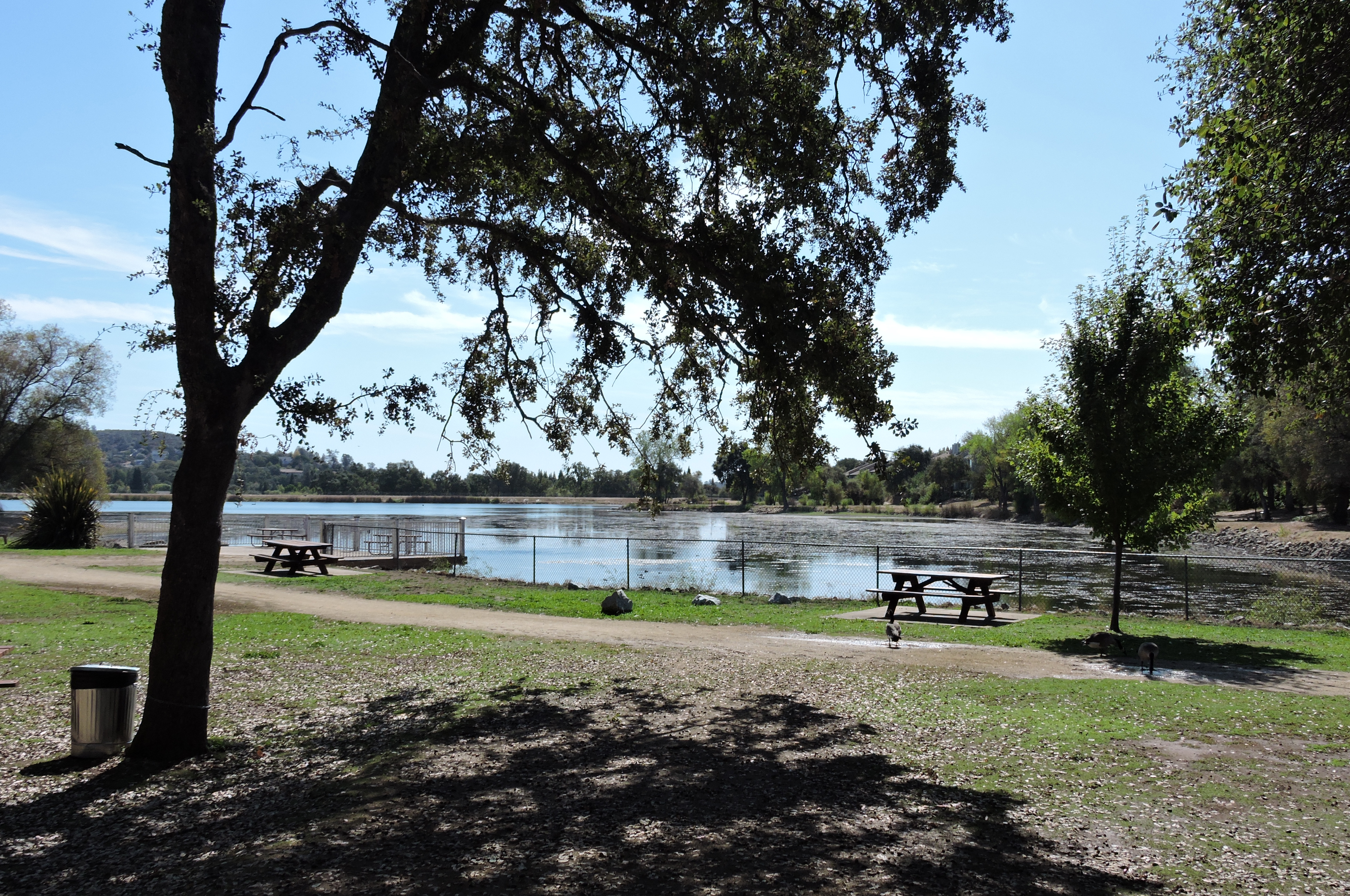
Cameron Park Lake

Cameron Park was once known as the home of "Sam's Town", where many travelers stopped on their way to and from Lake Tahoe. This restaurant and amusement complex was located along Highway 50, but was torn down in 2002 and is now Fork Lift by Nugget Markets, a grocery store and part of the Nugget Markets chain. All that remains is a plaque noting its former existence.

Parts of the Skinner Vineyard and Winery from the early 1860s can be seen at the intersection of Green Valley Road and Cameron Park Drive. All that is left of Skinner's ranch is a portion of the cellar (integrated into the Cameron Park Nursery on the northeast corner of the intersection), a tiny remnant of the distillery wall (behind mobile homes in the mobile home park near the southeast corner of the intersection), and the Skinner cemetery (near the south-west corner of the intersection). The cemetery contains the graves of James and Jessie Skinner (née Bernard) and three of their sons. The cemetery is located on a small hill just west of the intersection behind a pizza restaurant. Only remnants of a few headstones and fence remain due to the effects of time and vandalism. There are several other "pioneer" cemeteries located throughout Cameron Park.

El Dorado Community Health Center (EDCHC) is a Federally Qualified Health Center 501(c)(3) with a wide range of services in Cameron Park, CA, including; General Health, Dental Services, Pharmacy, Prevention & Wellness, Immunizations, Behavioral Health, Podiatry and Flu/Pneumonia Immunization.

== Notable Parks ==
Cameron Park has a few large family friendly parks, Rasmussen Park includes baseball and soccer fields. Rasmussen Park features a small bridge spanning a small brook, a mile long track for walking and jogging, two separate playgrounds, as well as the playing fields.

The Cameron Park Lake area features a developed lake, that is part of the Deer Creek that flows through western El Dorado County, and into eastern Sacramento County. The lake is surrounded by a walking track. The park includes a disc golf course, tennis courts, fishing, extensive picnicking and wildlife viewing areas. There is a fee to enter Cameron Park Lake.

Christa McAuliffe Park is also a park of noteworthy size, situated between Camerado Springs Middle School and U.S. Route 50. It consists of a playground, benches, picnicking, a skate park, and large rugby or soccer fields.

== Education ==
The CDP is divided between two elementary school districts: Rescue Union Elementary School District and Buckeye Union Elementary School District. All of the CDP is in the El Dorado Union High School District.
