= Prometheus (tree) =

Oldest known non-clonal organism

Coordinates: 38.99887°N 114.29903°W

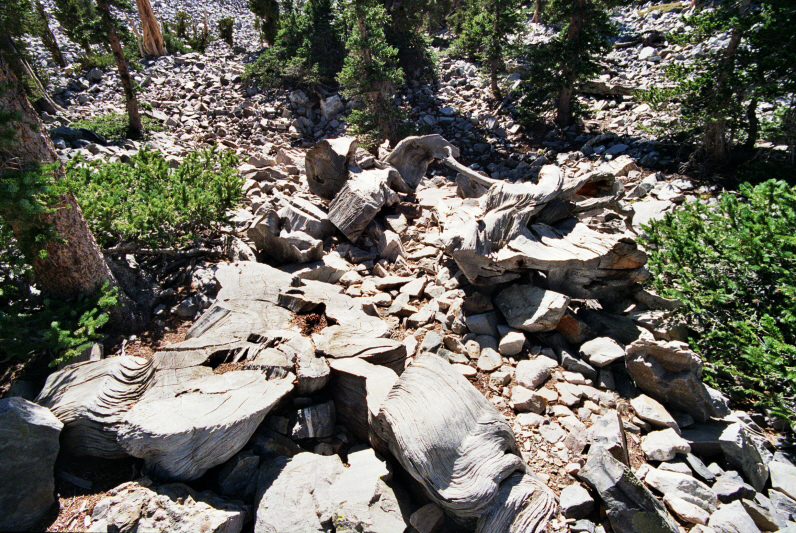
The stump (lower left) and some remains of the Prometheus tree (center), in the Wheeler Bristlecone Pine Grove at Great Basin National Park near Baker, Nevada

Prometheus (recorded as WPN-114) was the world's oldest known non-clonal organism, a Great Basin bristlecone pine (Pinus longaeva) tree growing near the tree line on Wheeler Peak in eastern Nevada, United States. The tree was at least 4,862 years old and possibly more than 5,000. It was cut down in 1964 by a graduate student and United States Forest Service personnel for research purposes. Those involved did not know of its world-record age before the cutting, and the circumstances and decision-making process remain controversial.

The tree's name refers to the mythological figure Prometheus, who stole fire from the gods and gave it to man. The designation WPN-114 was given by the original researcher, Donald Rusk Currey, and means it was the 114th tree he sampled in his research in Nevada's White Pine County.

== Discovery and age ==
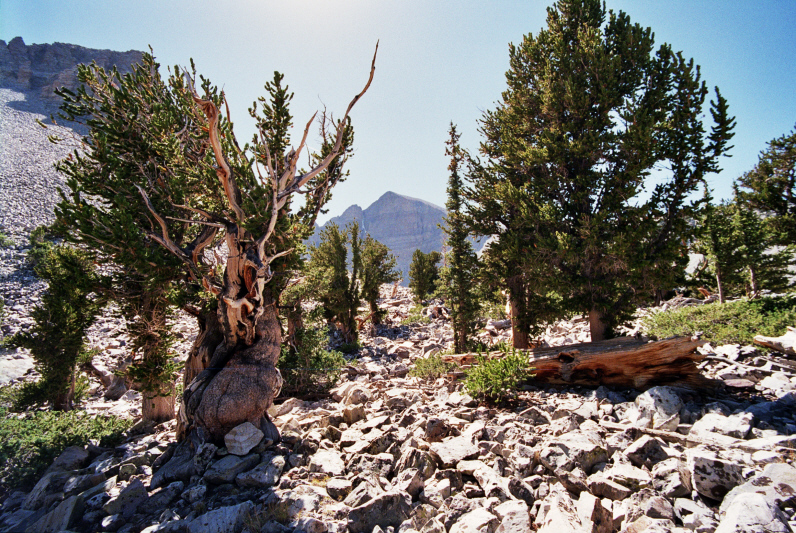
The grove in which Prometheus grew, with the headwall of Wheeler Peak in the distance

Prometheus (WPN-114) was a living member of a population of bristlecone pine trees near the tree line on the lateral moraine of a former glacier on Wheeler Peak, in Great Basin National Park, eastern Nevada. Wheeler Peak is the highest mountain in the Snake Range, and the second highest mountain in the state of Nevada. The bristlecone pine population on this mountain is divided into at least two distinct sub-populations, one of which is accessible by a popular interpretive trail.

Prometheus, however, grew in an area reachable only by off-trail hiking. In either 1958 or 1961, a group of naturalists who admired Prometheus's grove gave names to a number of the largest or most distinctive trees, including Prometheus.

Currey originally estimated the tree was at least 4,844 years old. A few years later, this was increased to 4,862 by Donald Graybill of the University of Arizona's Laboratory of Tree-Ring Research. These ring counts were done on a trunk cross-section taken about 2.5 m (8 feet) above the original germination point of the tree, because the innermost rings were missing below that point. Adjusting Graybill's figure by adding the estimated number of years required to reach that height, plus a correction for the estimated number of missing rings (not uncommon in trees at the tree line), it is probable that the tree was at least 5,000 years old when it was cut down. That made it the oldest known unitary (i.e. non-clonal) organism at the time, exceeding even the Methuselah tree of the White Mountains' Schulman Grove, in California, though Methuselah was later redated to 4,850 years old.

== Other possible oldest organisms ==
In 2010, a reportedly living bristlecone pine in California's White Mountains was measured by Tom Harlan to be 5,062 years old. This pine has not been found after Harlan's death in 2013, and its core has not been located at the Laboratory of Tree-Ring Research.

Whether Prometheus should have been considered the oldest organism ever known depends on the definition of "oldest" and "organism". Certain sprouting (clonal) organisms, such as creosote bush or aspen, may be considered older if the entire clonal organism is considered. By that standard, the oldest living organism is a grove of quaking aspens in Utah known as Pando, at perhaps as much as 80,000 years old, although likely much less. In a clonal organism, however, the individual clonal stems are not nearly so old, and no part of the organism is particularly old at any given time. Until 2012, Prometheus was thus the oldest non-clonal organism yet discovered, with its innermost, extant rings exceeding 4,862 years of age.

== Cutting of the tree ==
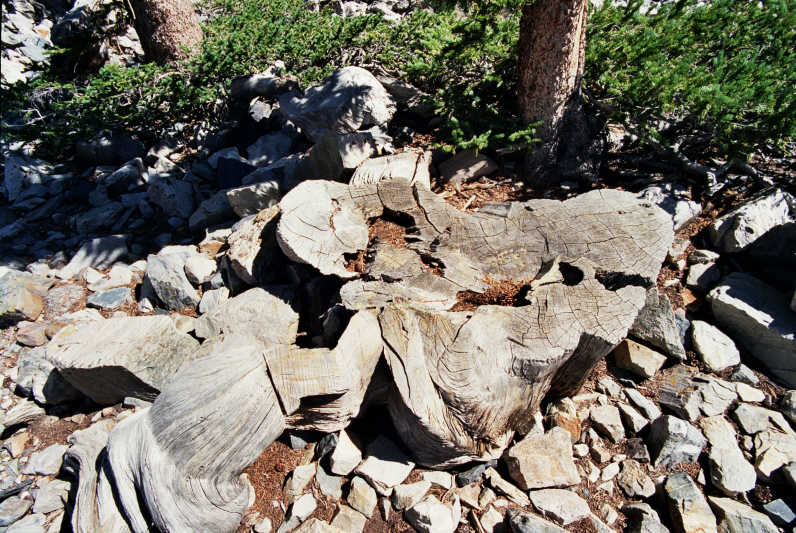
The stump of the Prometheus tree

In the 1950s, dendrochronologists were making active efforts to find the oldest living tree species. They intended to analyze the rings for various research purposes, such as evaluation of former climates, dating of archaeological ruins, and addressing the basic scientific question of maximum potential lifespan. Bristlecone pines in California's White Mountains and elsewhere were discovered by Edmund Schulman to be older than any species yet discovered. This spurred interest in finding very old bristlecones, possibly older than the Methuselah tree, aged by Schulman in 1957 at over 4,700 years.

Donald R. Currey was a graduate student at the University of North Carolina at Chapel Hill. Currey was studying climate dynamics of the Little Ice Age using dendrochronology techniques. In 1963, he became aware of the bristlecone populations in the Snake Range in general, and on Wheeler Peak in particular. Based on the trees' size, growth rate and growth forms, he became convinced that some were very old, cored some of them, and found trees exceeding 3,000 years in age, but Currey was not able to obtain a continuous series of overlapping cores from WPN-114.

It is not clear whether Currey requested, or Forest Service personnel suggested, that he cut down and section the tree in lieu of coring it. There is also some uncertainty as to why a core sample could not be obtained. One version has it that he broke or lodged his only long increment borer and could not obtain another before the end of the field season; another claims he broke two of them, while another implies that a core sample was too difficult to obtain and also would not provide as much definitive information as a full cross-section of the tree. Currey said that the tree cores were too small and difficult to read so he used a chain saw to cut the tree down.

In addition, there are conflicting views of Prometheus's uniqueness in the Wheeler Peak grove. It is reported that Currey and/or the Forest Service personnel who authorized the cutting believed the tree was just one of many large, very old trees in the grove. Others, at least one of whom was involved in the decision-making and tree cutting, believe that the tree was clearly unique — obviously older than other trees in the area.

At least one person involved says that Currey knew that to be true at the time, although there is no known admission from Currey that he did, and others have disputed that the tree, based on observation alone, was obviously much older than the others.

In his 1965 scientific publication, Currey states that he had the tree cut (1) to find out whether the oldest bristlecones were necessarily confined to the White Mountains of California, as earlier dendrochronological studies seemed to suggest, and (2) to study the climate of the Little Ice Age. At the time, the Little Ice Age referred to the last 4,000 years, although the term has since been restricted to the cold climatic period extending from the 14th to the 19th centuries.

The tree was cut down and sectioned in August 1964, and several pieces of the sections were hauled out to be processed and analyzed, first by Currey, then by others in later years. Sections or pieces of the tree have ended up in various places, some of them publicly accessible, including the Great Basin National Park visitor center (Baker, Nevada), the Ely Convention Center (Ely, Nevada), the University of Arizona Laboratory of Tree-Ring Research (Tucson, Arizona), and the U.S. Forest Service's Institute of Forest Genetics (Placerville, California).

== Repercussions ==
The cutting down of Prometheus contributed to the protection of bristlecone pines in general, and the Wheeler Peak groves in particular. There had been a movement to protect the mountain and contiguous areas as a national park before the incident, and 22 years later the area gained national park status. Currey himself spoke at the US Congress in support of the park's creation.

== Contemporary references ==
In August 2014, marking the fiftieth anniversary of the tree's cutting, a two-day memorial for Prometheus was held in Great Basin National Park by artist Jeff Weiss.

== See also ==
- King Clone
- King's Lomatia
- Llangernyw Yew
- Old Tjikko
- List of oldest trees
- List of individual trees
