= Pope Baldwin Bike Path =

The Pope Baldwin Bike Path is a paved bike path in Lake Tahoe, California that runs from the city limits of South Lake Tahoe, California to the beginning of the climb of California State Route 89 up Emerald Bay. Along the way it passes by Pope, Kiva and Baldwin Beaches.

A branch of the path passes directly through Pope and Baldwin Estates in the Tallac Historic area run by the U.S. National Forest Service. It also passes over Taylor Creek, a popular area especially in the fall when the Kokanee salmon are spawning.

The Rainbow Trail leads to a National Forest Visitors Center and stream profile center that allow visitors to see underwater.

A side bike path connects to Fallen Leaf Lake Campground which leads to scenic lake views.

The trail is open all year (subject to snow) and is free for all to use.
