= National Register of Historic Places listings in El Dorado County, California =

Location of El Dorado County in California

This is a list of the National Register of Historic Places listings in El Dorado County, California.

This is intended to be a complete list of the properties and districts on the National Register of Historic Places in El Dorado County, California, United States. Latitude and longitude coordinates are provided for many National Register properties and districts; these locations may be seen together in an online map.

There are 23 properties and districts listed on the National Register in the county, including 1 National Historic Landmark.

This National Park Service list is complete through NPS recent listings posted September 4, 2026.

== Current listings ==
	Name on the Register	Image	Date listed	Location	City or town	Description
1	Baldwin Estate	Baldwin Estate	April 1, 1987 (#87000496)	NW of US 50 and CA 89 jct. on N side of CA 89; 38°56′16″N 120°02′46″W	South Lake Tahoe	
2	Bayley Hotel	Bayley Hotel	December 18, 1978 (#78000660)	N of Pilot Hill on CA 49; 38°50′39″N 121°00′50″W	Pilot Hill	
3	Coloma	Coloma	October 15, 1966 (#66000207)	7 miles (11 km) NW of Placerville on CA 49; 38°48′03″N 120°53′29″W	Placerville	
4	Coloma Community Hall		August 22, 2025 (#100012016)	319 CA 49; 38°48′03″N 120°53′30″W	Coloma	
5	Combellack-Blair House	Combellack-Blair House	February 14, 1985 (#85000259)	3059 Cedar Ravine; 38°43′40″N 120°47′42″W	Placerville	
6	Confidence Hall	Confidence Hall	January 4, 1982 (#82002174)	487 Main St. 38°43′47″N 120°47′59″W	Placerville	
7	Crawford Ditch		October 21, 1991 (#91001522)	Address Restricted	Pleasant Valley	
8	Eddy Tree Breeding Station		March 31, 1987 (#87000485)	2480 and 2500 Carson Rd. 38°44′19″N 120°44′17″W	Placerville	
9	Episcopal Church of Our Saviour	Episcopal Church of Our Saviour	November 17, 1977 (#77000291)	2979 Coloma St. 38°43′48″N 120°48′08″W	Placerville	
10	Fountain-Tallman Soda Works	Fountain-Tallman Soda Works	September 13, 1984 (#84000770)	524 Main St. 38°43′45″N 120°47′54″W	Placerville	
11	Georgetown Civil War Armory	Georgetown Civil War Armory	September 18, 2017 (#100001601)	6259 Main St. 38°54′21″N 120°50′22″W	Georgetown	Georgetown CA Civil War Armory, built in 1862, circa 2014. The Armory is the oldest brick building in Georgetown and is the only extant Civil War armory building in El Dorado County, CA
12	Hattie (Gold Bug), Priest and Silver Pine Mines and Stampmill	Hattie (Gold Bug), Priest and Silver Pine Mines and Stampmill	November 15, 1985 (#85003522)	2501 Bedford Ave. 38°44′41″N 120°47′50″W	Placerville	
13	Heller Estate	Heller Estate	April 1, 1987 (#87000497)	NW of US 50 and CA 89 jct. on N side of CA 89; 38°55′59″N 120°02′30″W	South Lake Tahoe	
14	Lombardo Ranch		September 30, 1977 (#77000292)	1709 Carson Rd. 38°44′35″N 120°46′24″W	Placerville	
15	Mountain Quarries Bridge	Mountain Quarries Bridge	February 11, 2004 (#04000014)	North Fork of the American River; 38°54′46″N 121°02′30″W	Auburn	Concrete arch bridge built in 1912, spanning the North Fork of the American River. Spans into Placer County.
16	John Pearson Soda Works	John Pearson Soda Works	December 12, 1985 (#85003326)	594 Main St. 38°43′43″N 120°47′48″W	Placerville	
17	Pope Estate	Pope Estate	April 1, 1987 (#87000495)	NW of US 50 and CA 89 jct. on N side of CA 89; 38°56′14″N 120°02′37″W	South Lake Tahoe	
18	Sugar Pine Point State Park	Sugar Pine Point State Park	March 30, 1973 (#73000401)	3 mi. S of Homewood on CA 90; 39°03′05″N 120°06′47″W	Homewood	
19	Tahoe Meadows	Tahoe Meadows	March 29, 1990 (#90000555)	US 50 between Ski Run Blvd. and Park Ave. 38°57′13″N 119°57′05″W	South Lake Tahoe	
20	United States Post Office-Main Street Branch		January 3, 2025 (#100011215)	515 Main St. 38°43′47″N 120°47′56″W	Placerville	
21	Vikingsholm	Vikingsholm	October 10, 1996 (#96001078)	10001 Emerald Bay Rd. 38°57′08″N 120°06′11″W	South Lake Tahoe	
22	Wakamatsu Tea and Silk Colony Farm	Wakamatsu Tea and Silk Colony Farm	October 9, 2009 (#09000397)	941 Cold Springs Rd. 38°46′15″N 120°53′12″W	Gold Hill	
23	Jacob Zentgraf House		February 24, 2025 (#100010882)	2441 Deer Valley Road; 38°42′32″N 121°01′22″W	Rescue	

== See also ==
- List of National Historic Landmarks in California
- National Register of Historic Places listings in California
- California Historical Landmarks in El Dorado County, California
