= John Pearson Soda Works =

- Pearson, John, Soda Works
- U.S. National Register of Historic Places
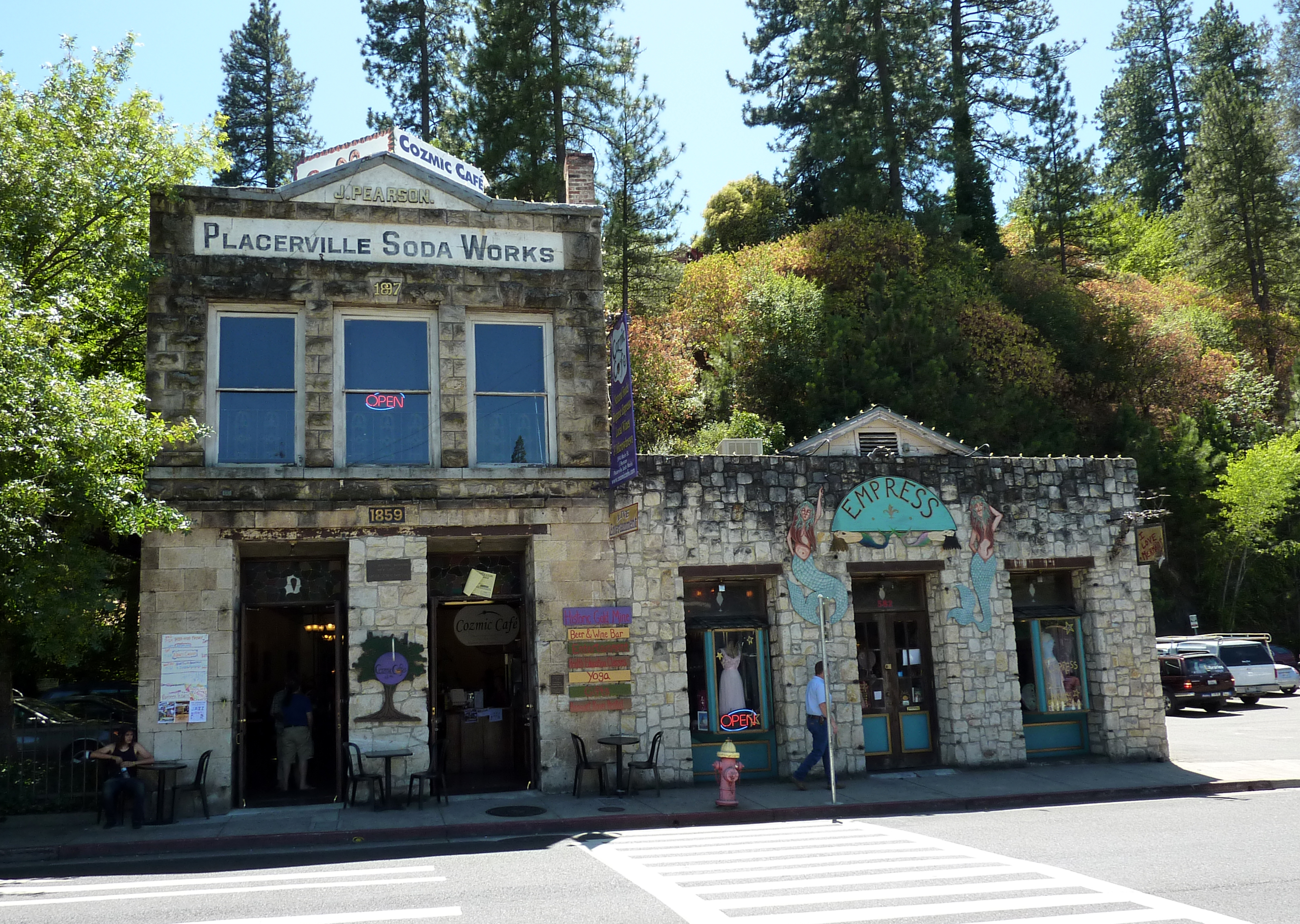

- Location within California Location within the United States
- Location: 594 Main St., Placerville, California
- Coordinates: 38°43′43″N 120°47′48″W
- Built: 1859
- Architect: Pearson, J.
- Architectural style: Rustic vernacular Victorian
- NRHP reference No.: 85003326
- Added to NRHP: December 12, 1985

The John Pearson Soda Works, also referred to as the Placerville Soda Works, is a historic rustic vernacular Victorian brick building in Placerville, El Dorado County, California. The building, in the Gold Country region, was placed on the National Register of Historic Places (NRHP) on December 12, 1985. The building housed the Cozmic Café coffee shop and venue from 2003 until 2018.

== History ==
=== 19th century ===
The John Pearson Soda Works structure was built in several stages: The previous building on the site burned down in a devastating fire that affected most of Placerville in the 1850s. Scottish immigrant John McFarland Pearson built the lower portion of the building in 1859 as a commercial ice house. He chose to build in front of an idle mine shaft so he could use the underground rooms and tunnels to store ice at controlled temperatures. In addition, the walls of this section were made 22 inches (0.56 m) thick to keep the ice cool in the storefront. Pearson later expanded into soda water; his sons added the brick second story in 1897 to house the bottling operation. They added a water-driven elevator to transport the product from each level. The store also sold other groceries such as eggs and beer.

=== 20th century ===
The business changed hands several times, though the building remained in the Pearson family for some time. The Pearson sons sold the business in 1904 to the Scherrer Bros., who in turn sold it in 1934 to Robert Hook, who turned it into a Coca-Cola Bottling franchise.

The structure held other businesses until the Pearson family sold the building in 1972 to antique collector Roger John Douvres, who restored the structure over a period of four years, using the lower section as an old-fashioned soda fountain and the upper portion as an elegant dining hall decorated in early 20th-century style. Douvres' daughter had the building successfully placed on the National Register of Historic Places. The structure has also housed a theater, antique store, bookstore, music store and the Placerville Coffee House before becoming The Cozmic Café in 2003.

Another nearby soda works building, the Fountain-Tallman Soda Works, is also listed on the National Register of Historic Places.

== See also ==
- Fountain-Tallman Soda Works
- National Register of Historic Places listings in El Dorado County, California
