= Fountain-Tallman Soda Works =

- U.S. National Register of Historic Places
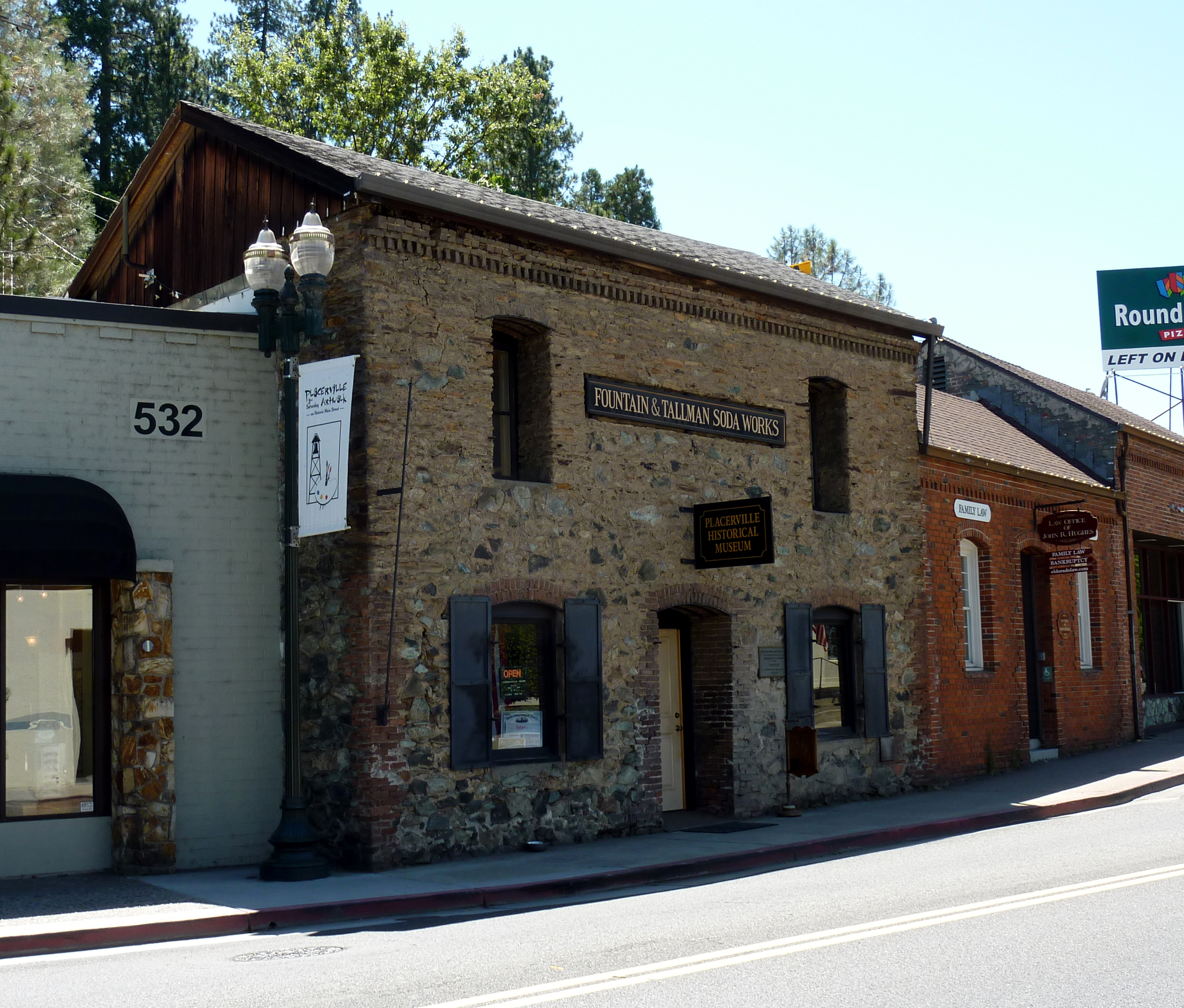

- Location within California Location within the United States
- Location: 524 Main St., Placerville, California
- Coordinates: 38°43′45″N 120°47′54″W
- Built: 1853
- Architectural style: Rustic vernacular Victorian
- NRHP reference No.: 84000770
- Added to NRHP: September 13, 1984

The Fountain-Tallman Soda Works is a historic building in Placerville, El Dorado County, California. It currently houses the Fountain & Tallman Museum, which is owned and operated by the El Dorado County Historical Society. The rustic vernacular Victorian stone and brick building, of the Gold Country, was placed on the National Register of Historic Places on September 13, 1984.

The two-story masonry structure was built as a soda water factory by John Fountain & Benjamin Tallman in 1852. The stone walls of the building are more than 2 feet (0.61 m) thick so ice and soda supplies could be kept cool. These construction materials also have protected it from fires that destroyed surrounding buildings (3 fires occurred in 1856 alone), and as a result it is one of the oldest buildings in Placerville. Water was pulled through a small wood framed hole in the wall from a spring out back in the hillside. An odd-looking contraption (a small pressure vessel) housed inside the building, added carbon dioxide (CO_{2}) to the water. A replica is currently on display. Bottles were then filled and pressure caps added with wire twists to hold the caps in place.

After the close of the soda water factory, the building served many different purposes for many different owners. At one time it was the town jail, the Pacific Gas & Electric Company office (1927–1961), and has had other associated uses and owners. When the building was donated to the El Dorado County Historical Society in 1981 by Fay Ripley Cannon, it became a museum upon the contingency that it be preserved for public benefit as a historical landmark, which was an earlier stipulation originating with the PG&E's sale. When the building was renovated, lifting up the stone floor revealed a bowie knife (handle long since rotted away), flakes of gold, and pieces of broken glass soda bottles with the original building owner's mark intact. These items are still on display inside.

The building was converted into a museum by the generosity of many donors including using funds from the estate of Placerville native Stella Tracy. Originally called the Placerville Historical Museum, it contains some of Tracy's turn-of-the-century furniture and photos as well as other exhibits of 19th- and 20th-century memorabilia.

Another nearby soda works, the John Pearson Soda Works, is also listed on the National Register of Historic Places.

== See also ==
- National Register of Historic Places listings in El Dorado County, California
