= Confidence Hall =

- U.S. National Register of Historic Places
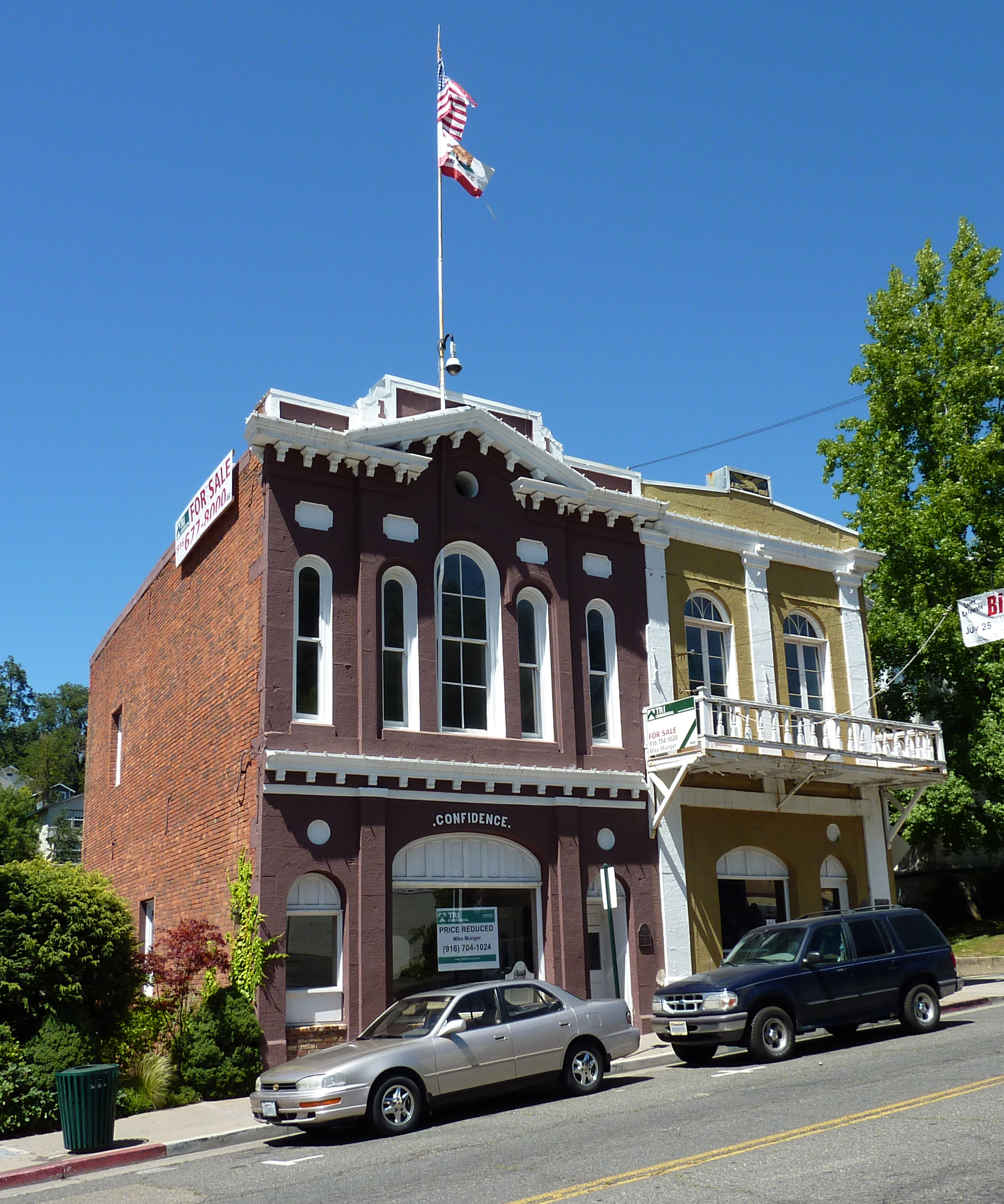
- Confidence Hall (L) and Jane Stuart Building (R) are both part of the same NRHP listing.

- Location within California Location within the United States
- Location: 487 Main St., Placerville, California
- Coordinates: 38°43′47″N 120°47′59″W
- Built: 1860
- Architect: Booth & DeVoe
- Architectural style: Italianate Style, Victorian
- NRHP reference No.: 82002174
- Added to NRHP: January 4, 1982

Confidence Hall is a historic Italianate Style, Victorian brick building in Placerville, El Dorado County, California. The building was placed on the National Register of Historic Places (NRHP) on January 4, 1982.

== History ==
The building was originally constructed as the Confidence Engine Company No. 1, a volunteer fire brigade. The brigade began as the Mountaineer Engine Company on May 22, 1857, but changed their name in June after they purchased a used fire engine called "Confidence" and found they were unable to remove the engraving. The original engine hall had been damaged by fire in September 1860, and the present building was built in fall of the same year. The fund-raising balls held by the company were very popular. In the late 1890s, the building was used for early meetings of Placerville's Seventh-day Adventist Church. The building has also served as the police department, jail and a justice court. When the El Dorado County Fair used to rotate the location of the event, Confidence Hall was one of its venues in Placerville.

In 1902, the building became Placerville City Hall. The Placerville City Library, the first public library in the county, was established in the upper floor of the building in 1906. The space was shared by the Placerville City Clerk's Office and separated by a gate which was opened only after the Clerk had finished his work. The library remained there until 1947. It remained Placerville City Hall until 2005.

The adjacent structure with a wooden balcony, the Jane Stuart Building, was built in 1861 and is on the inventory of the NRHP listing. Immigrant Jane Stuart funded its construction by driving a herd of horses across the Great Plains and selling them to a local dealer. The two buildings share a common wall and an internal hallway and door and have been used as a single tenant office building. The buildings have an estimated 6,360 square feet (590 m^{2}), which does not include an unfinished basement and an upstairs loft area.

After the Placerville City Government moved to a new city hall in 2005, the buildings, zoned for a broad range of uses, went on the market for over $1 million, but remained unsold and were repriced in June 2009 for $799,000.

== See also ==
- National Register of Historic Places listings in El Dorado County, California
