= Combellack–Blair House =

Historic house in California, United States

- U.S. National Register of Historic Places
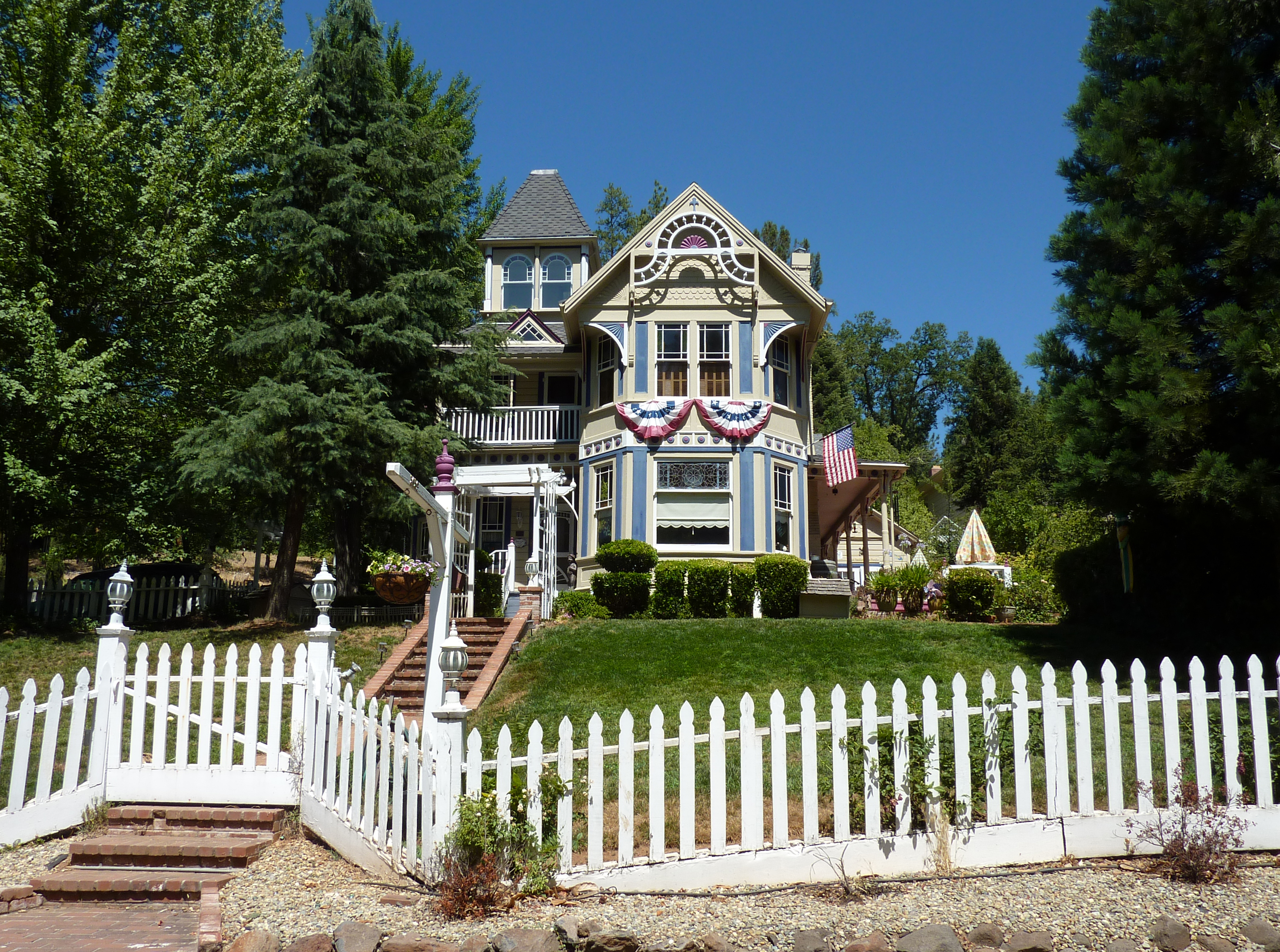

- Location within California Location within the United States
- Location: 3059 Cedar Ravine, Placerville, California
- Coordinates: 38°43′40″N 120°47′42″W
- Built: 1895
- Architectural style: Queen Anne Late Victorian
- NRHP reference No.: 85000259
- Added to NRHP: February 14, 1985

The Combellack–Blair House is a historic house in the Gold Rush town of Placerville, in El Dorado County, California, built in 1895. The landmark house was placed on the National Register of Historic Places (NRHP) on February 14, 1985.

== History ==
The Combellack–Blair House, designed in the Queen Anne Style of the Late Victorian architecture era, was built by William Hill Combellack in 1895. One of the residence's early owners operated Combellack's, a store on Main Street in Placerville. The Arthur Blair family purchased it in 1924. It served as a bed and breakfast for several years, but is now a private residence.

=== Thomas Kinkade ===
The home was featured in a Thomas Kinkade painting, Victorian Christmas. Kinkade, who grew up in Placerville, felt the house was the kind that "begged to be painted"; he placed it in an idealized turn of the 20th century Christmas scene.

== See also ==
- National Register of Historic Places listings in El Dorado County, California
