= Bayley Hotel =

Historic hotel in Pilot Hill, California, United States

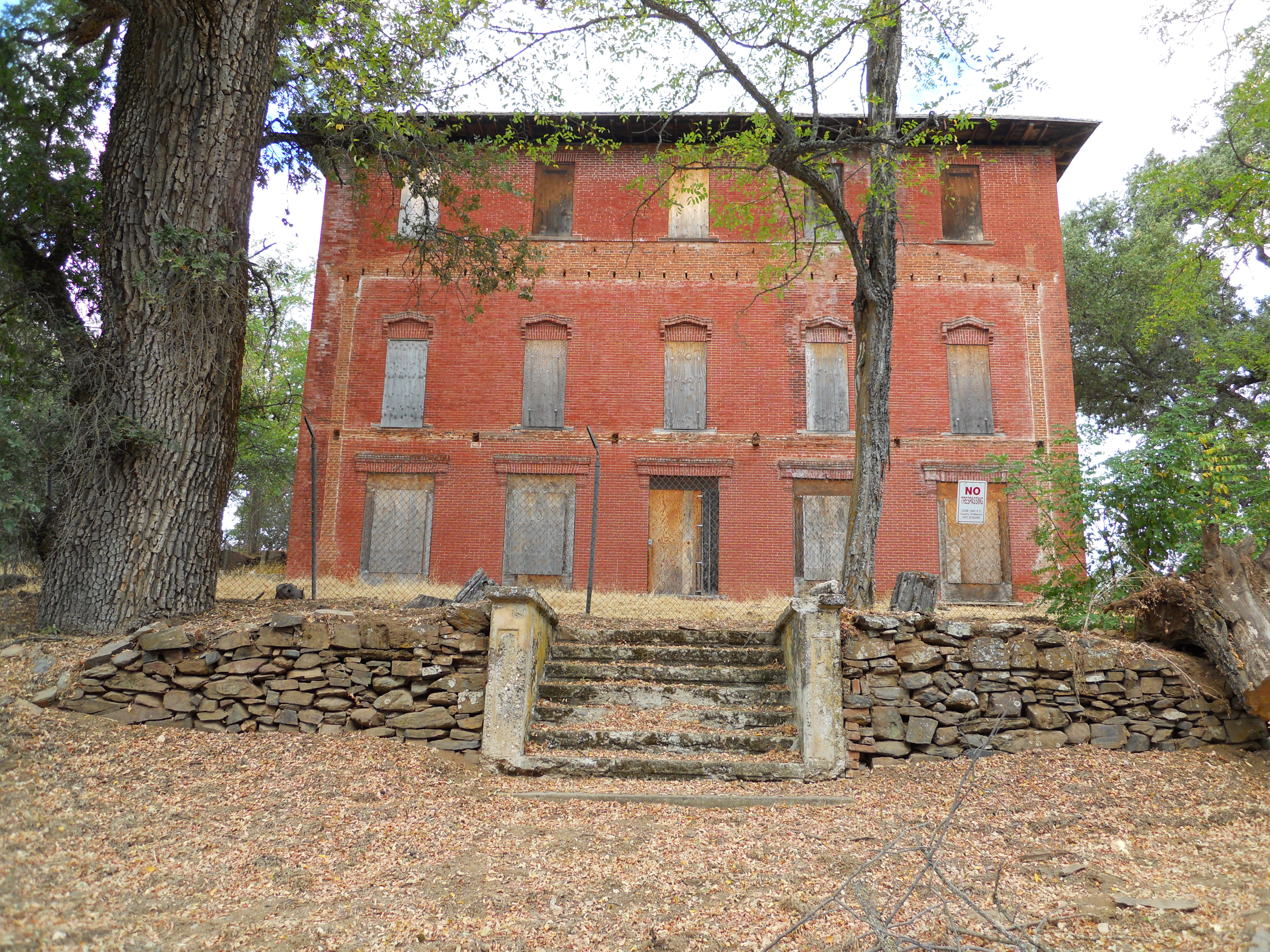
Front of Bayley Hotel

The Bayley Hotel, also known as the Bayley House, is a historic house located in Pilot Hill, California. Construction on the house was completed in 1862. The hotel was added to the National Register of Historic Places on December 18, 1978. It is located off California State Highway 49. It is the site of California's first Grange Hall, and the first grange hall on the Pacific Coast. The house is one of the best examples of classical revival architecture in the western United States.

== History ==
Construction on the hotel began in 1861 by Vermont-born attorney Alcander John Bayley. Bayley built the hotel after his previous hotel, the Oak Valley House (also located in Pilot Hill) burned down in 1861. Bayley planned to open the hotel in response to rumors that the Central Pacific Railroad would be built through Pilot Hill. It was completed in 1862 at the cost of $20,000. Upon completion, the structure was 10,000 square foot, three stories tall and had 22 rooms for guests. It had six fireplaces, a grand ballroom on the second floor, and a balcony lining the front. The building was never used as a hotel, however, and the structure became the private residence of the Bayley family after the Central Pacific Railroad was built through nearby Auburn instead of Pilot Hill.

The first Grange Hall (Pilot Hill Grange No. 1) in California was organized on August 17, 1870, by Alcander Alonzo Bayley, Alcander's son. On opening the lodge had 29 members. One of the members was James W. Marshall, who was the first to discover gold in Coloma, ushering in the California gold rush. The site of the hall was eventually torn down, and a placard was installed to mark the site where the hall had built.

During the 1880s the Bayley family ran a general store out of the hotel.

Alcander Bayley died of appendicitis on June 8, 1896. He is buried on the property with his wife, Elizabeth Bayley (d. 1897). While tombstones originally marked the location of their graves, their graves are now unmarked and the exact locations are unknown.

In the 1930s a metal roof was installed over the old shingle roofing.

By 1941 the hotel had become a private residence, owned by ranchers who worked the property. In 1956, the Steves family occupied the property.

During the 1970s the hotel became abandoned and fell into disrepair after being held by a number of private owners. A number of the home's original features were destroyed by vandalism or removed by other means. Ownership of the hotel was donated to El Dorado County by 1977 by the firm Alexander and Baldwin. El Dorado County attempted a sale of the property in 1980, with the condition that the buyers would restore the hotel. Ownership eventually passed from the county to the Georgetown Divide Recreation District in 1989 for the cost of $1.

== Restoration Efforts ==
The Friends of The Bayley House is a non-profit organization aiming to open the Bayley house as a museum and cultural center. Phase 1 of the project to restore the house was completed in 2008.

== See also ==
- National Register of Historic Places listings in El Dorado County, California
