= Donald Rusk Currey =

American academic (1934–2004)

- Born: January 24, 1934
- Died: June 6, 2004 (aged 70)
- Education: University of North Carolina at Chapel Hill
- Known for: Felling of the Prometheus
- Scientific career
- Fields: Geography and dendrochronology

Donald Rusk Currey (January 24, 1934 – June 6, 2004) was an American professor of geography. While known in academia for his extensive research and exploration of relics of the ancient Lake Bonneville in the eastern Great Basin, he was best known to the public for his controversial felling of Prometheus, the oldest living non-clonal organism then known, while a graduate student in 1964.

== Prometheus controversy ==
=== Discovery and felling ===
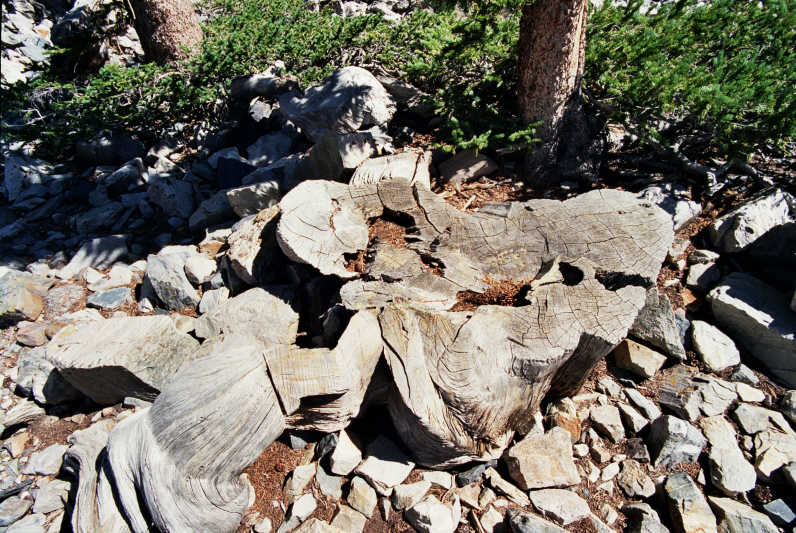
The cut stump of Prometheus

In 1963, Currey was a graduate student at the University of North Carolina at Chapel Hill. Under a fellowship from the National Science Foundation, Currey was studying the climate dynamics of the Little Ice Age using dendrochronology techniques.

The bristlecone pines that grow in California, Nevada and Utah were discovered to be older than any species yet dated, and in 1963 Currey became aware of a Great Basin Bristlecone Pine population in the Snake Range and on Wheeler Peak in eastern Nevada in particular. At the time he visited the area, in the summer of 1964, he did not know that previous researchers had examined the area. Based on the size, growth rate and growth forms of some of the trees he became convinced that some very old specimens existed on the mountain and, using the scientific methods of the time, Currey began taking core samples to check. He found that some exceeded 3,000 years in age, taking particular interest in a tree he designated WPN-114 (the aforementioned Prometheus).

Currey was unable to obtain a continuous series of overlapping cores from WPN-114: he had tried at least four times with a 28-inch-long (71 cm) borer, breaking two borers, but to no avail. He decided to ask for permission from the United States Forest Service to fell the tree. He was already acquainted with Forest Service officials at the nearby Lehman Caves National Monument (later part of the much larger Great Basin National Park which includes the area Currey was working in), and made a request to Donald E. Cox, a district Forest Service ranger, for permission to cut down the tree in order to examine the whole trunk in cross-section. Cox felt that the request was scientifically sound and, after convincing superiors that the particular tree was not a landmark, gained approval for felling it.

After securing permission, Cox informed Currey and assigned a Forest Service crew to join the young researcher and bring back the samples. The tree was cut and sectioned on August 6, 1964, and several pieces of the sections hauled out to be processed and analyzed, first by Currey, then, later, by others. To their surprise, the tree was not only old, but older than any other non-clonal organism known until 2013, when the Methuselah tree passed the age of Prometheus.

=== Aftermath ===
It took a few years for the information about the felling of Prometheus to reach the public, but once it did there was great controversy. Most criticism centered on the U.S. Forest Service's decision to permit the tree to be cut. Further, some critics questioned how the cutting of such an old tree was necessary given the topic Currey was studying. Since the Little Ice Age started no more than 600 years ago, many trees could presumably have provided the information he was after for that time period. However, in Currey's original report (Currey, 1965) he refers to the Little Ice Age as encompassing the entire period since 2000 BC, thus defining the Age over a much longer period than was later accepted. Whether this was actually a common sentiment at the time, or simply a retroactive conclusion to explain the felling of such an old tree, is not known. In the article, Currey indicates that he sectioned the tree as much over the question of whether the oldest bristlecones were necessarily confined to California's White Mountains (as some dendrochronologists had been claiming) as from its usefulness in regard to studies of the Little Ice Age.

The incident led to a tighter restriction on the felling of old trees, the eventual creation of Great Basin National Park overseen by the National Park Service, and the decision to hide the exact location of Methuselah, the tree then believed to be the oldest. Currey personally lobbied to get Congress to designate the area part of a national park.

== Later career ==
Currey went on to a successful academic career. By the time his paper on his finding was published in the journal Ecology, he had become a member of the faculty at Chapel Hill. He went on to earn his Ph.D. in 1969 from the University of Kansas and joined the faculty of the Department of Geography at the University of Utah in 1970, becoming full and later Professor Emeritus.

He spent over two decades researching and exploring relics of ancient Lake Bonneville in the eastern Great Basin. His papers on Lake Bonneville became the most cited papers in his department. His work examined the geomorphology of lakes, paleolakes, lake basins, and coasts; paleolimnology and geochronology of Quaternary lakes; geodynamics of Quaternary lakes; geoarchaeology; and desert, mountain, and Arctic environmental change.

== Death ==
Currey died at age 70 on June 6, 2004, shortly after being hospitalized for a sudden illness. He was honored during the 2005 Annual Meeting of the Association of American Geographers, with an annual field trip by The Geological Society of America, and the University of Utah Department of Geography established a scholarship in his name.
