= Eddy Tree Breeding Station =

Coordinates: 38°44′23″N 120°44′32″W

The Eddy Tree Breeding Station, also called the Institute of Forest Genetics, is a historical forestry research center located in Placerville, California. It is located at 2480 Carson Road. It was established in 1925 by James Garfield Eddy of Seattle. It was added to the National Register of Historic Places on March 31, 1987.

== History ==
The breeding station was established in 1925 by James Eddy in response to the dwindling lumber supply in the county and across the country. At that time, approximately 80,000,000 acres of land in the United States had been deforested from logging or from fire. Eddy aimed to selectively breed trees in order to produce better quality lumber and tree yield. He sought help from famed botanist and horticulturalist Luther Burbank for research. Placerville was chosen as the ideal area to build the institute due to the climate of the region.

Eddy privately funded the project as he was unable to secure government funding. He also received occasional funding from the Carnegie Institute. Eddy asked Burbank to head the project, but Burbank refused due to his age and interest in other areas of study. University of California, Berkeley professor and researcher Lloyd Austin was chosen to head the project instead. Eddy chose to focus his research on pine trees due to their abundance in California and because pine trees consisted of half of the world's logging consumption. Pine seeds were collected from 40 different countries and brought to the institute.

In the first year of study, 58 species of pines were being raised at the station. By the next year this number had risen to 87 species. By 1935 the station become largest and most complete arboretum of pines in the world, with 100 species of pines growing at the station. As the trees grew careful measurements were taken of the height, diameter, size, limb growth, form, frost resistance, flowering, fruiting, etc. Trees with desirable traits were selected and cross-bred with others to create hybrid trees. For example, the Monterey pine (Pinus radiata) was bred with the knobcone pine (P. attenuata) to produce a tree that had the fast-growing traits of the Monterey but was much more frost resistant like the knobcone. Another area that research concentrated on was the Ponderosa pine (P. ponderosa). The institute has created over 66 different hybrid pine trees.

In 1932, the name of the station was officially changed to the Institute of Forest Genetics (IFG), a name which remains up to this day. In 1935, the Eddy chose to donate the institute to the United States Forestry Service for greater funding and research opportunities. The institute remains in the hands of the forestry service today and continues to conduct research.

== See also ==
- National Register of Historic Places listings in El Dorado County, California
- James G. Eddy House and Grounds
