= Church of Our Saviour (Placerville, California) =

Historic church in California, United States

- Episcopal Church of Our Saviour
- U.S. National Register of Historic Places
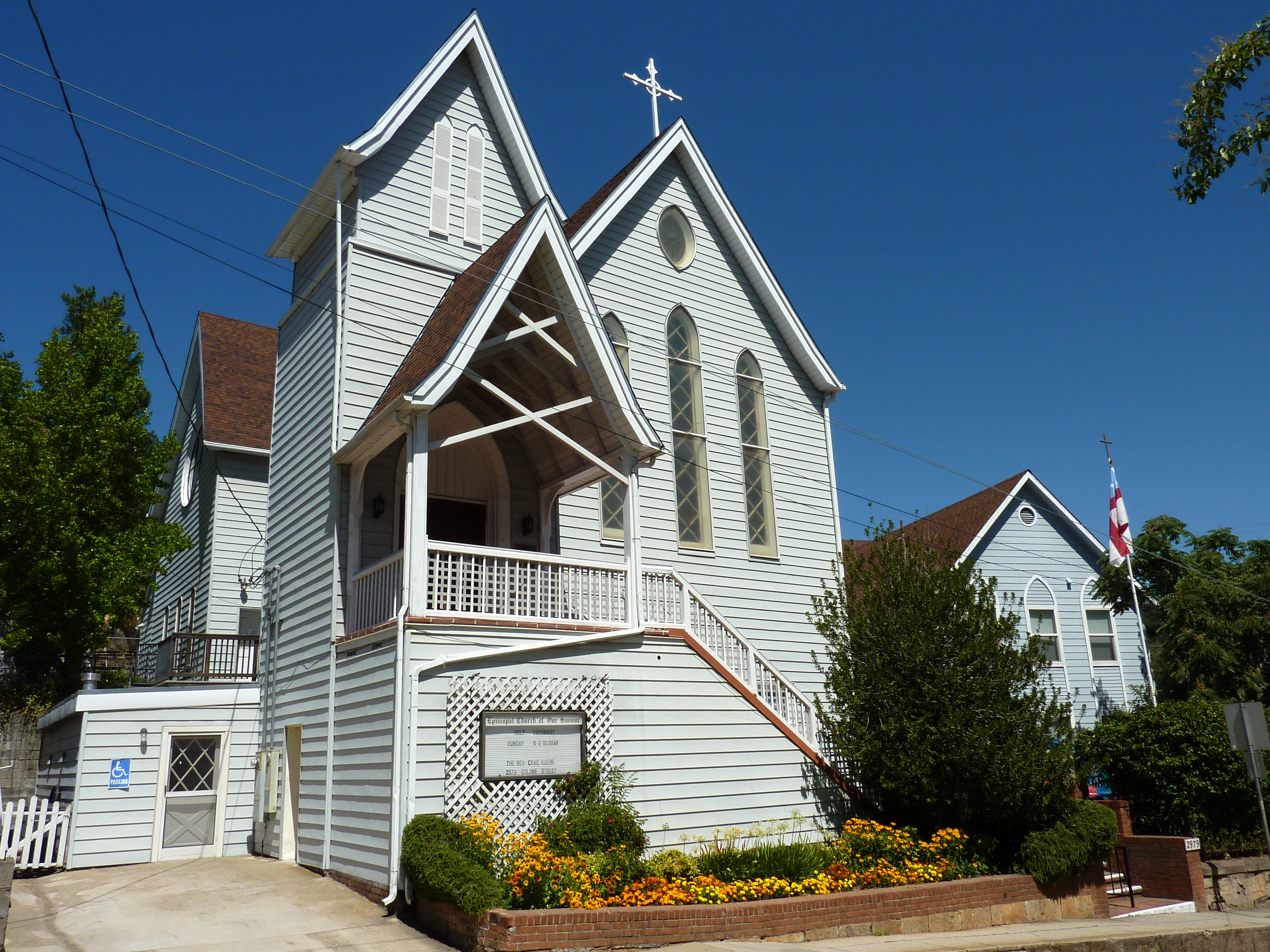

- Location within California Location within the United States
- Location: 2979 Coloma Street, Placerville, California
- Coordinates: 38°43′48″N 120°48′08″W
- Area: 0.1 acres (0.040 ha)
- Built: 1865; 161 years ago
- Built by: O. Taylor
- Architect: William Patton
- Architectural style: Carpenter Gothic
- NRHP reference No.: 77000291
- Added to NRHP: November 17, 1977

The Church of Our Saviour is a historic Carpenter Gothic Episcopal church located at 2979 Coloma Street, in Placerville, El Dorado County, California, in the United States. The church is part of the Episcopal Diocese of Northern California. On November 17, 1977, it was listed in the National Register of Historic Places as the Episcopal Church of Our Saviour.

It was designed by English-born architect William Patton.

== History ==
The Church of Our Saviour was originally organized by the Rev. Charles Caleb Peirce on July 20, 1861, in the midst of the California Gold Rush. Our Saviours’ first services were conducted by The Rev. Mr. Peirce in the Old Court House in Placerville. The Rev. Mr. Peirce (he stated that he disliked being called "Father") expected to find a parish called "Saint Mary's Episcopal Church," that was allegedly begun in 1857. Unfortunately, the parish could not be found. There is no record of its demise.

The new congregation continued to use the Court House as a place of worship, and it was not until 1864 that a move to erect a church building was initiated. The ladies of the church on the Fourth of July of that year held a faire. They donated the proceeds from that event for the building fund. This was the first of many fairs that the Episcopal Church Women (ECW) held.

Following this were a series of events; the final effort occurring in May 1865 when a three-day fair and bazaar was held, netting $1,200. At this time, the lot on Coloma Street was purchased and work on the church building begun.

The Rev. Mr. Peirce was famous for his good character in that he is reported to "have looked for and found good in all people." An excerpt from C. E. Upton's book, The Life and Work of the Rev. C. C. Peirce, illustrates this facet of his character.

The Mountain Democrat newspaper in June 1865, told how the El Dorado Lodge of Free & Accepted Masons laid the cornerstone of the Church of Our Saviour. On December 23 of the same year the newspaper reported: “The opening of the new, elegant and beautiful Episcopal Church on Coloma Street will take place this Saturday evening with the annual distribution of books by Rev. C. C. Peirce”.

Bishop William Ingraham Kip of San Francisco consecrated the building on April 15, 1866. The completed church cost about $10,500.

Architect William Patton of San Francisco designed the structure. Mr. [O. Taylor of Placerville built the parish building. When the Rev. Mr. Peirce died on March 14, 1903, schools and businesses closed in his memory.

The first renovation of the church was in 1927. The cost of the work amounted to $10,000. In 1938, the second restoration of the church building was undertaken. The $4,000 project included repairs to the outside of the building, new paint and a new roof for the nave. The interior also underwent extensive repairs. A coal-burning furnace was added and the brickwork at the front of the church was laid. The paneling for the sanctuary was designed and installed. In 1957, chimes were given to the parish in the memory of Fr. Peirce and other additions, such as the aluminum roof, were added.

In 1976, the house behind the church was purchased and demolished to provide a much-needed parking lot. The old rectory next to the church was torn down and a new one-story building was erected with classrooms and office space.

In 1982, more was accomplished. New composition shingles were installed following a storm that blew off half of the old tin roof. This happened during Holly Faire that year. The stained glass windows were repaired and three new beautiful ones were installed. Also a hand carved Corpus was hung on the plain wooden cross above the sanctuary.

The Sunday school building that was built in 1976 was not adequate to meet the needs of the growing parish, so a new two-story building was erected with a capital funds drive raising about $110,000 and completed in 1999. A round stained glass window honoring the ministry of the Rev. Canon James Burnett was installed in 2003. A columbarium was installed in 2005.

On this hill overlooking downtown Placerville, the Church of Our Saviour continues to be the landmark in the area that it has been since it was built. It is the oldest continually occupied church building in El Dorado County. The church and parish celebrated their 150th anniversary in 2011.

== See also ==
- National Register of Historic Places listings in El Dorado County, California
- List of Registered Historic Places in California
