= Pope Estate =

Historic house in California, United States

- U.S. National Register of Historic Places
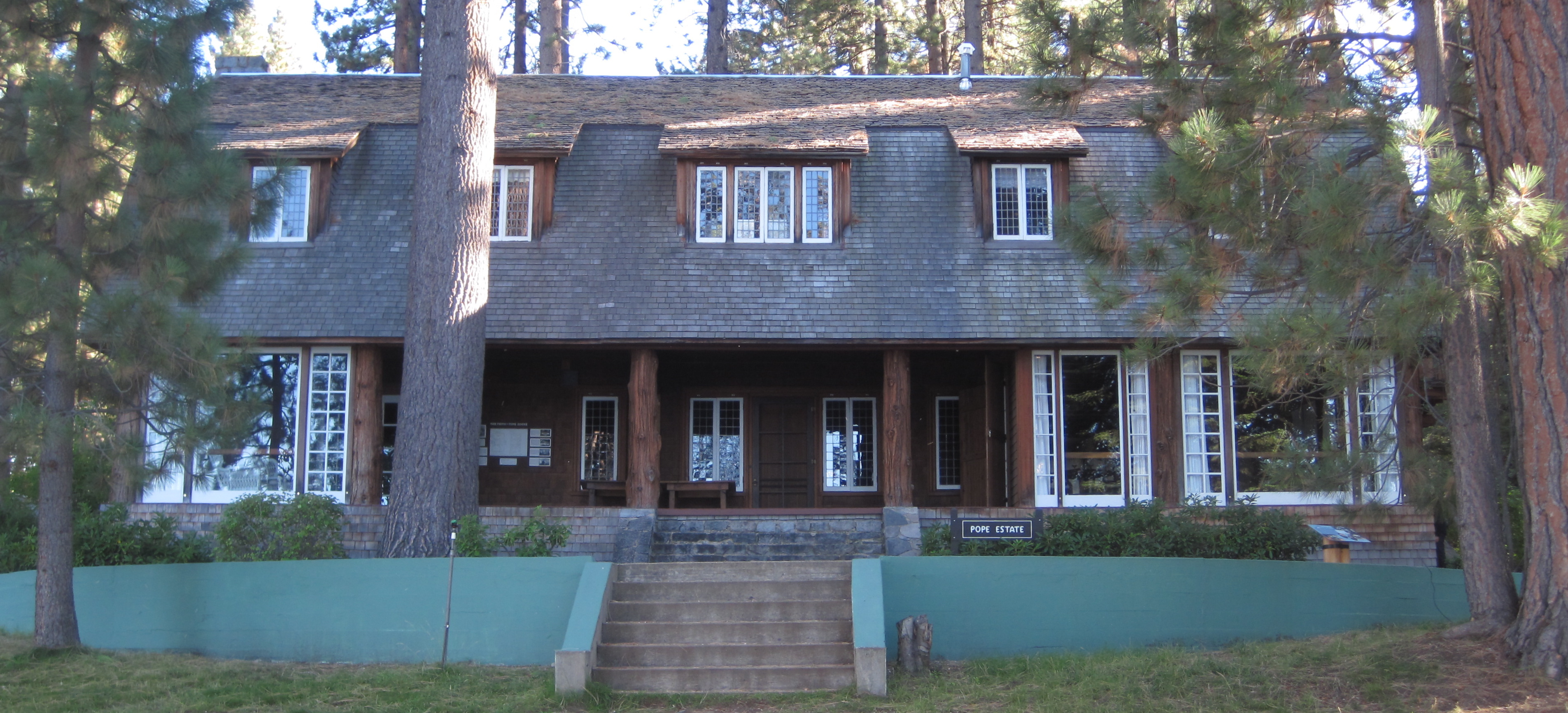
- Lakeside view of the estate

- Location within California Location within the United States
- Location: NW of US 50 and CA 89 jct. on N side of CA 89, South Lake Tahoe, California
- Coordinates: 38°56′14″N 120°02′37″W
- Area: 32.5 acres (13.2 ha)
- Built: 1884
- Architectural style: Colonial Revival, Shingle Style
- NRHP reference No.: 87000495
- Added to NRHP: April 1, 1987

The Pope Estate is a historic home located in Camp Richardson, near South Lake Tahoe, California.

The home was originally built by Lloyd Tevis, former president of Wells Fargo Bank, in the 1880s. The Tevis and Pope families used the home and grounds as a summer vacation spot. The grounds contain several servants cabins and the main dwelling is constructed entirely of wood and shingle-clad sidings.

== Gallery ==
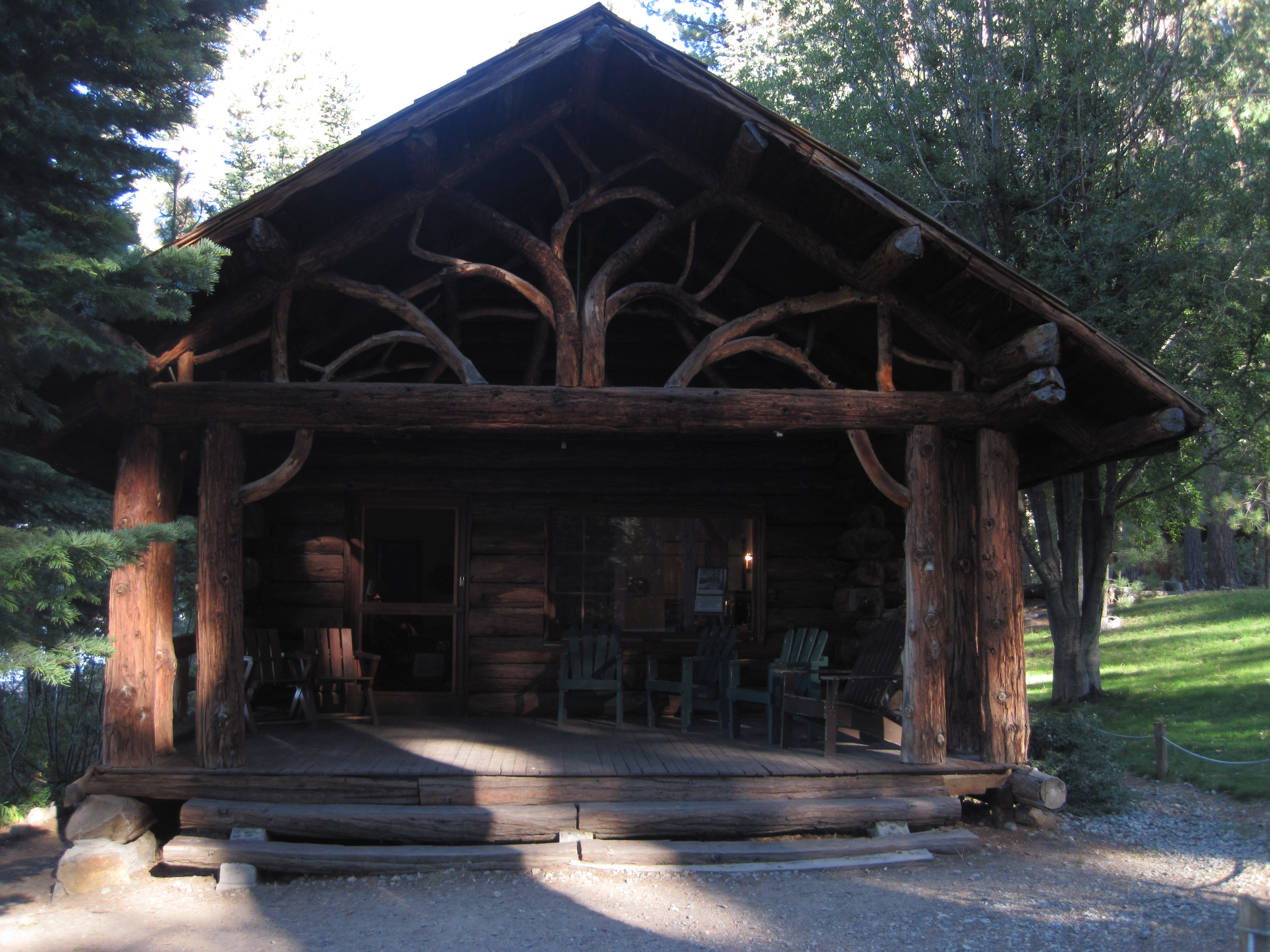
Indian Cabin

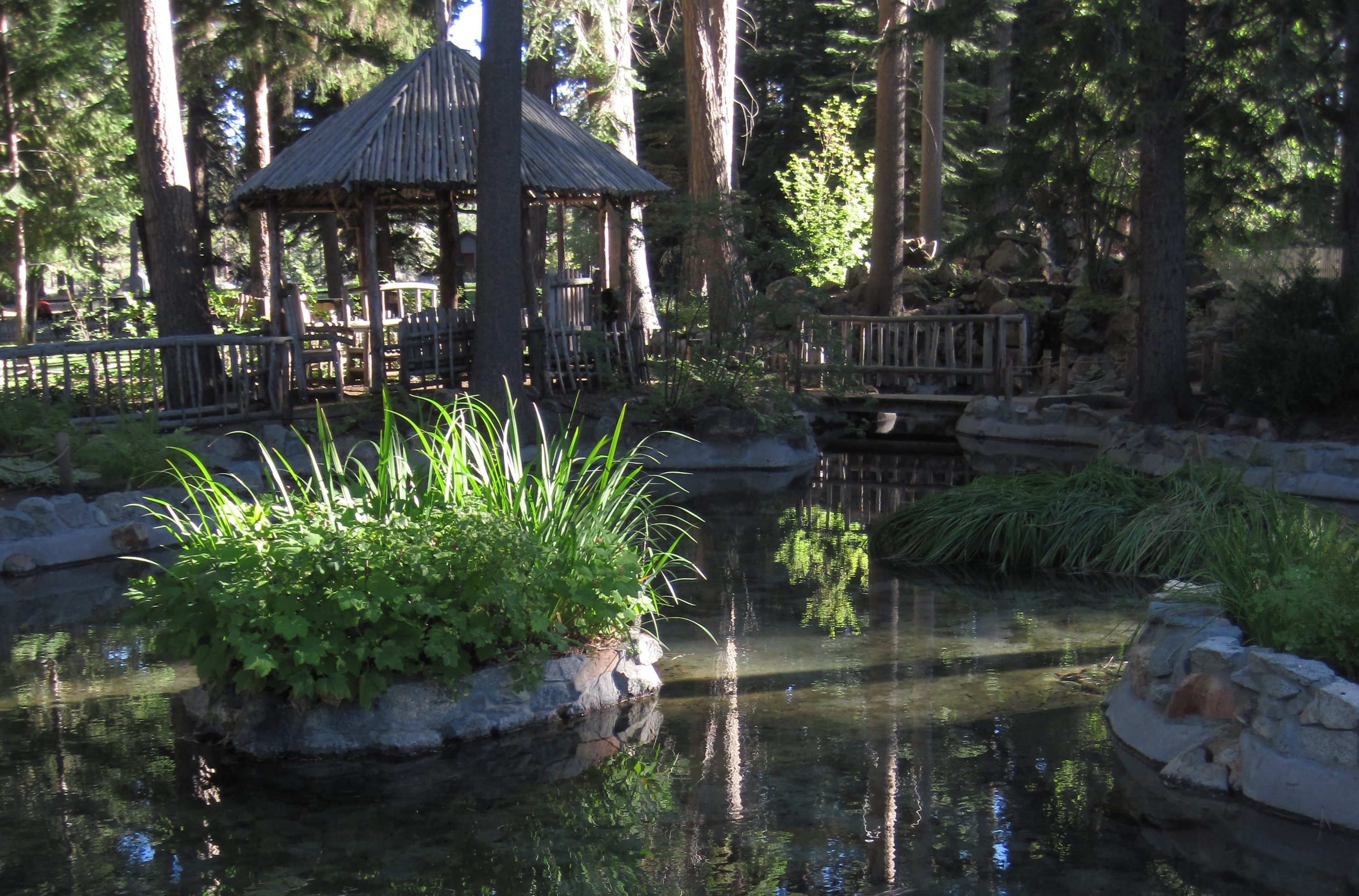
Arborteum in the Pope Estate Gardens

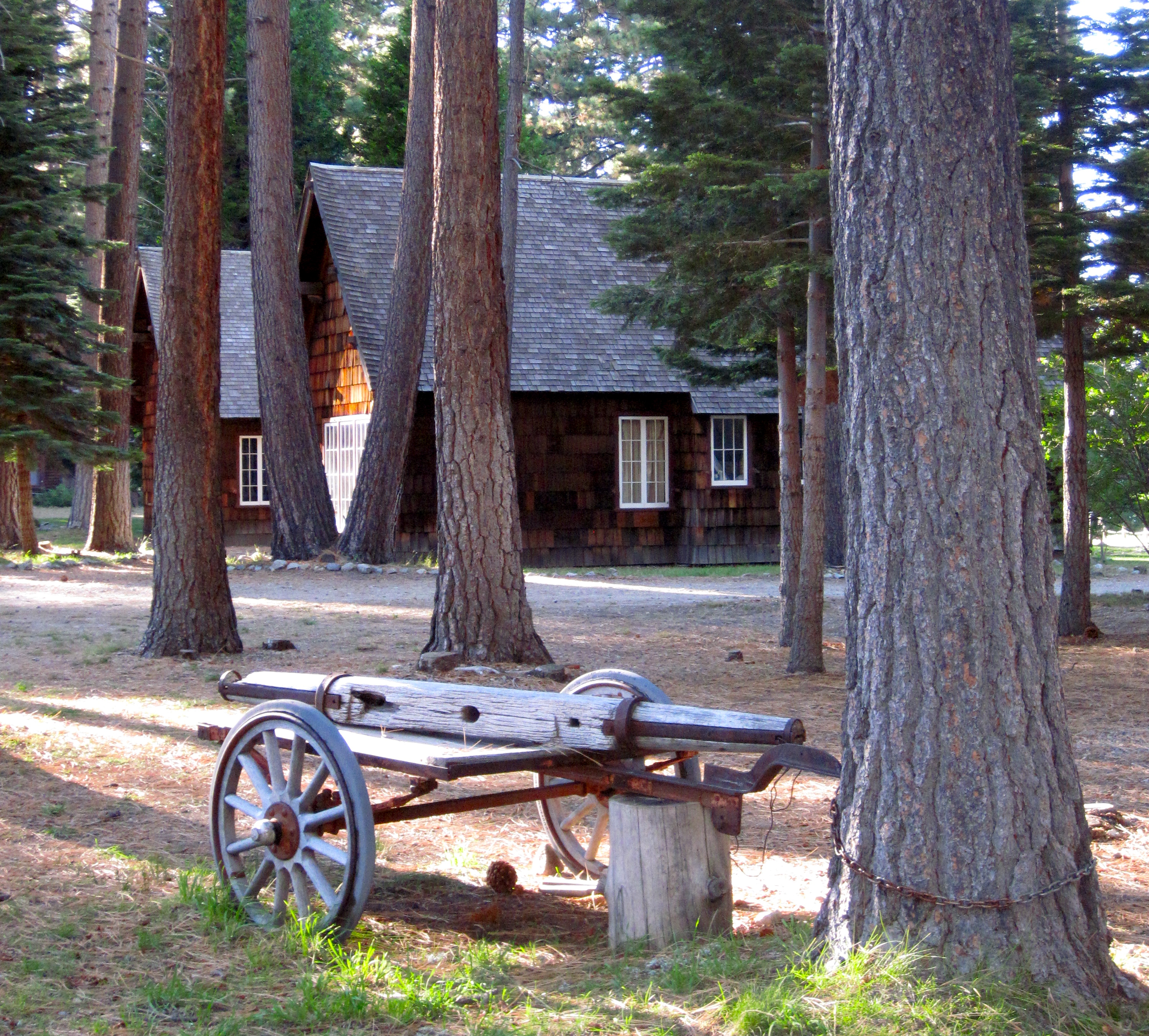
Twin Cabins

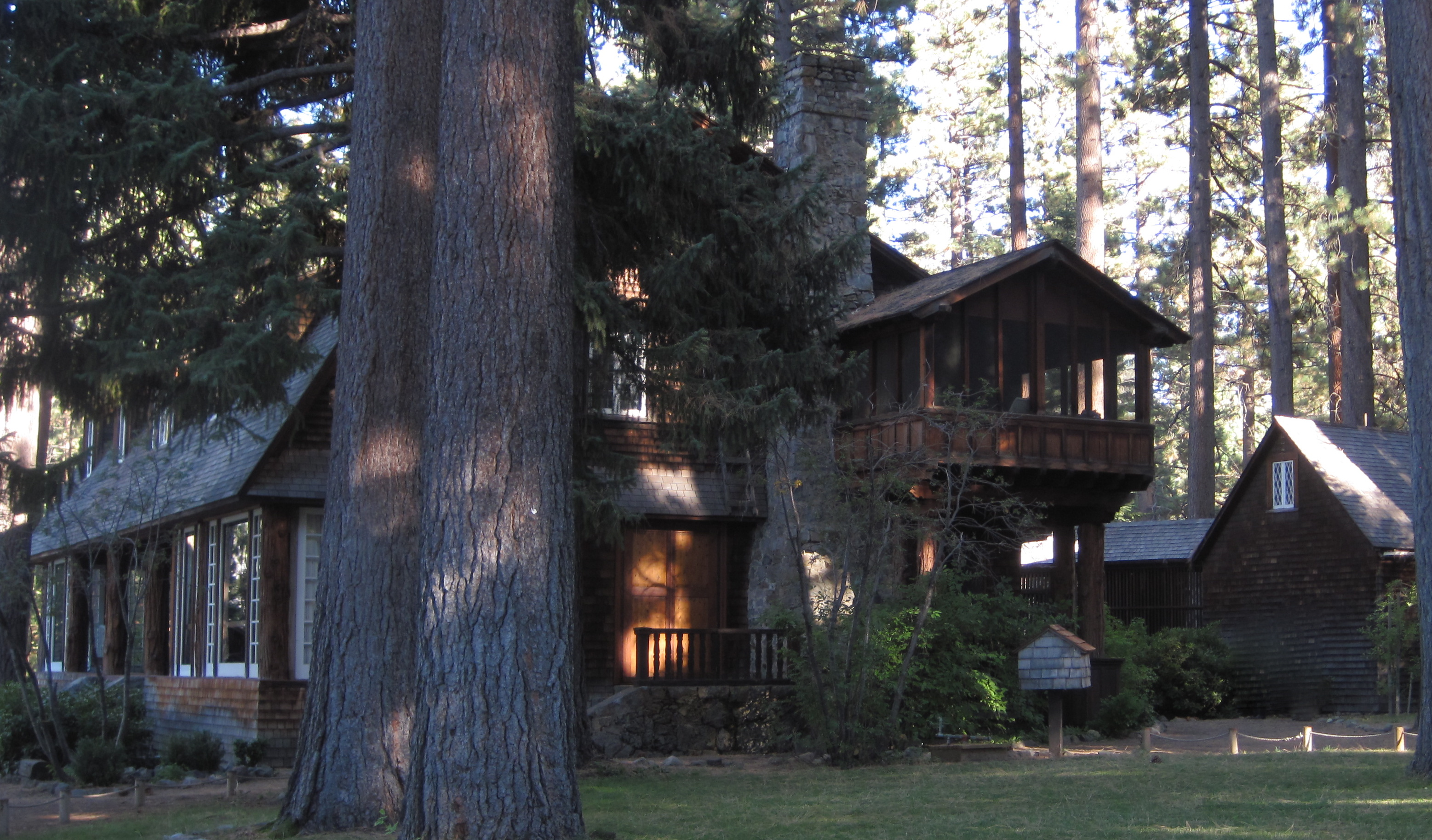
Side of Pope House, with view of Mrs. Pope's sun room

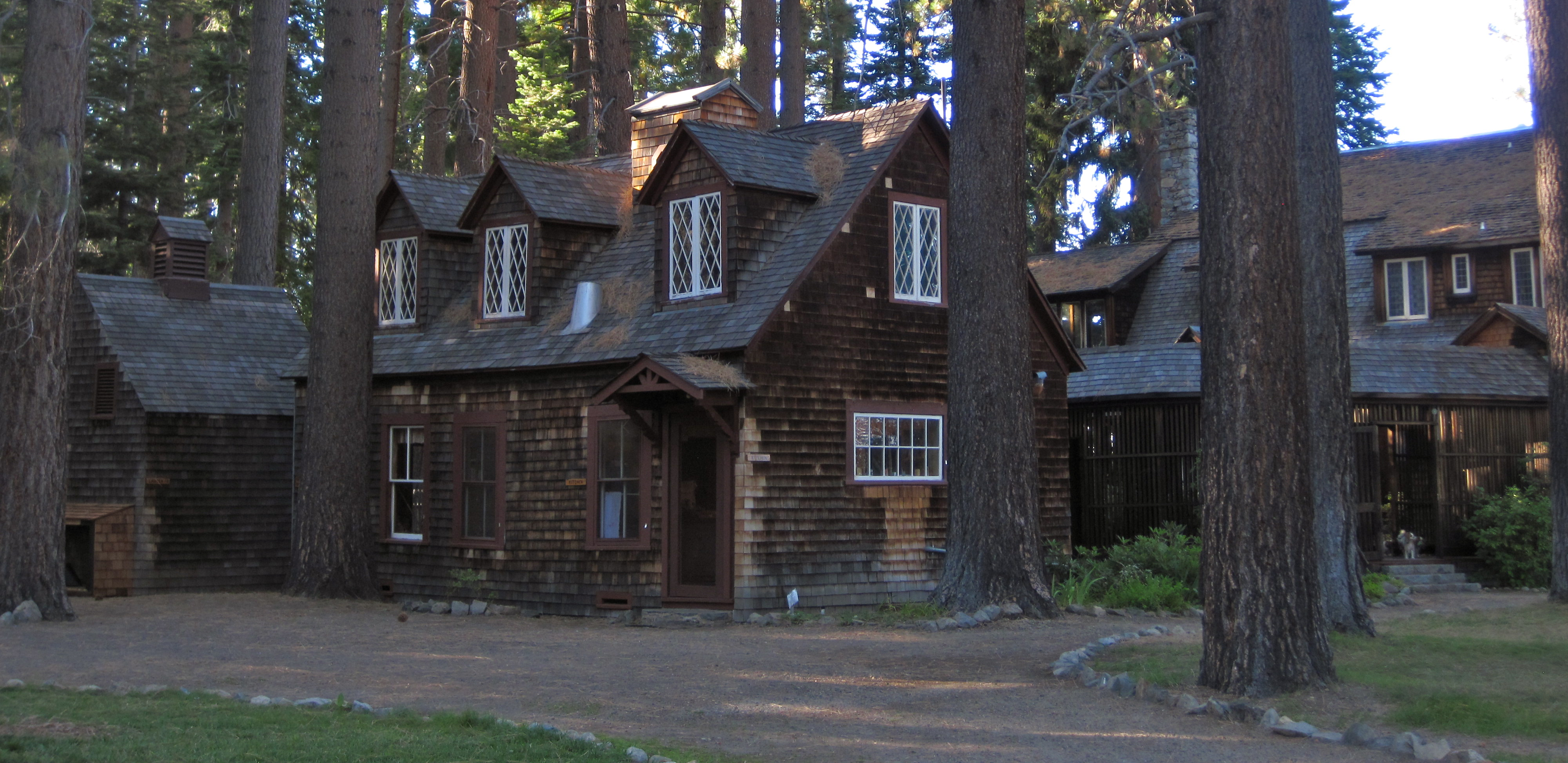
Back of the Pope House, with view of the Kitchen
