= Placerville, California =

City in California, United States

- City
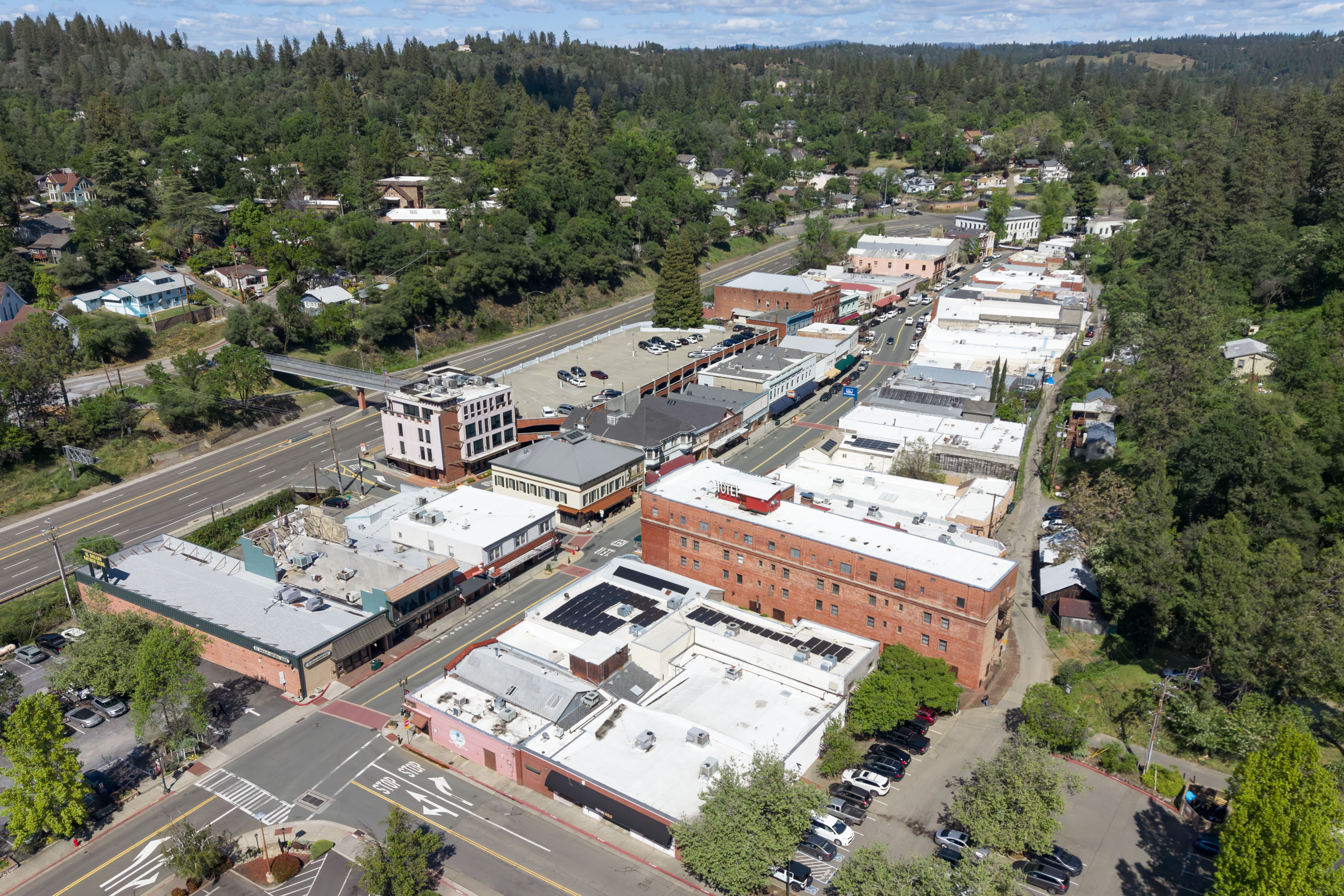
- Downtown Placerville

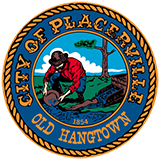
- Seal
- Nickname: Hangtown
- Interactive map of Placerville, California
- Location of Placerville in Northern California Location of Placerville in California Location of Placerville in the United States
- Coordinates: 38°43′47″N 120°47′55″W
- Country: United States
- State: California
- County: El Dorado
- Incorporated: May 13, 1854

Government
  - Mayor: John Clerici

Area
  - Total: 5.84 sq mi (15.13 km^{2})
  - Land: 5.84 sq mi (15.13 km^{2})
  - Water: 0 sq mi (0.00 km^{2}) 0.01%
- Elevation: 1,867 ft (569 m)

Population (2020)
  - Total: 10,747
  - Density: 1,840/sq mi (710.3/km^{2})
- Time zone: UTC-8 (PST)
  - Summer (DST): UTC-7 (PDT)
- ZIP Code: 95667
- Area code: 530, 837
- FIPS code: 06-57540
- GNIS feature IDs: 277577, 2411433
- Website: www.cityofplacerville.org

California Historical Landmark
- Official name: Placerville - Overland Pony Express Route
- Reference no.: 701

California Historical Landmark
- Official name: Old Dry Diggins-Old Hangtown
- Reference no.: 475

Placerville (/ˈplæsərvɪl/ PLASS-ər-vil; placer, Spanish for "sand deposit", representing the placer mining that was predominant in the town's development, and ville, French for "town") is a city in and the county seat of El Dorado County, California, United States. The population was 10,747 as of the 2020 census, up from 10,389 as of the 2010 census. It is part of the Sacramento metropolitan area.

== History ==
A former Maidu settlement called Indak was located at the site of the town.

After the discovery of gold at Sutter's Mill in nearby Coloma, California, by James W. Marshall in 1848 sparked the California Gold Rush, the small town now known as Placerville was known as Dry Diggin's after the manner in which the miners moved cartloads of dry soil to run water to separate the gold from the soil.

Later in 1849, the town earned its most common historical name, Hangtown, because of the numerous hangings that had occurred there. However, there is debate on exactly how many lynchings occurred in the town. The town had no police force (in 1849) and five immigrants attempted robbery of a Mexican gambler. Of the five immigrants, two Frenchmen and one Chilean were known wanted men, and they were not given any trial, instead they were hanged on an oak tree on Main Street by a mob. The name "Hangtown" stuck after that event.

By about 1850, the temperance league and a few local churches had begun to request that a more friendly name be bestowed upon the town. The name was not changed until 1854 when the City of Placerville was incorporated, taking the name from the local placer gold deposits. At its incorporation, Placerville was the third largest town in California. In 1857, the county seat was then moved from Coloma to Placerville, where it remains today. The town's first post office opened in 1850. In 1871, the Placerville Union Cemetery was founded by a group of fraternal organizations, and it holds the graves of many of the city founders.

Digital reconstruction of a unique American flag flown to celebrate Christmas in 1862

Placerville was a central hub for the Mother Lode region's mining operations. The town had many services, including transportation (of people and goods), lodging, banking, and had a market and general store. The history of hard-rock mining is evidenced by an open and accessible Gold Bug Park & Mine, now a museum with tours and books.

The Sacramento and Placerville Railroad, (later part of the Southern Pacific Railroad) had a branch line that extended from Folsom to Placerville. The track was abandoned in the 1980s and is now used by heritage railroads. The Camino, Placerville and Lake Tahoe Railroad (now abandoned) also operated an eight-mile (thirteen-kilometer) shortline that operated between Camino, California, and Placerville until June 17, 1986. The track right-of-way is now a 37-mile hiking and biking path that connects the city of Folsom, California to the town of Camino with plans to extend the trail across the entire El Dorado county and eventually to Lake Tahoe.

Placerville is now registered as California Historical Landmark #701.

Placerville's logo featured a hangman's noose, in reference to the town's history as "Hangtown", until 2021, when the town council voted to remove it. An earlier proposal to redesign the logo had been rejected in 2020.

== National Register of Historic Places gallery ==
Placerville has several buildings listed on the National Register of Historic Places; several are noted below.

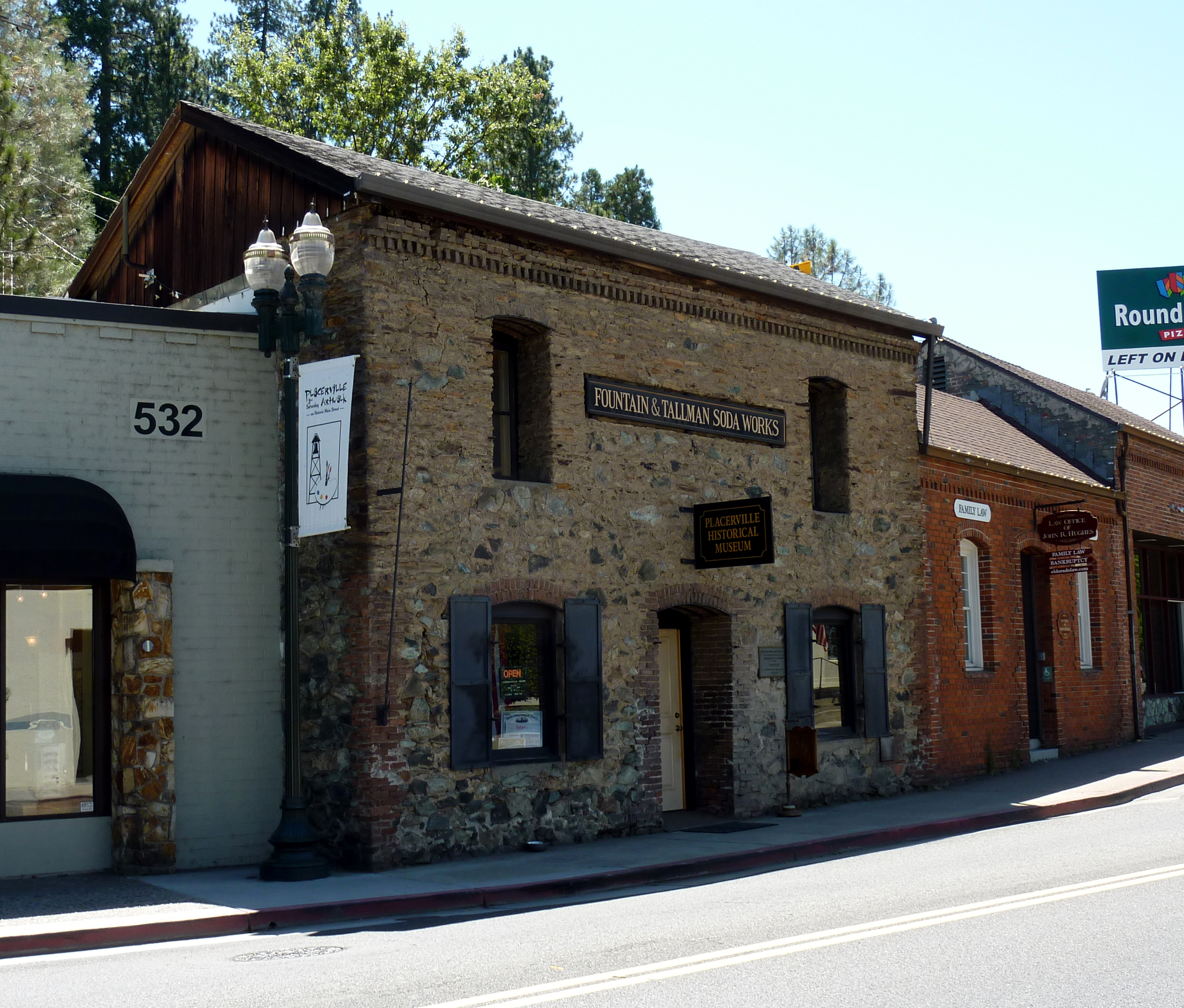
Fountain-Tallman Soda Works (now the Fountain & Tallman Museum)

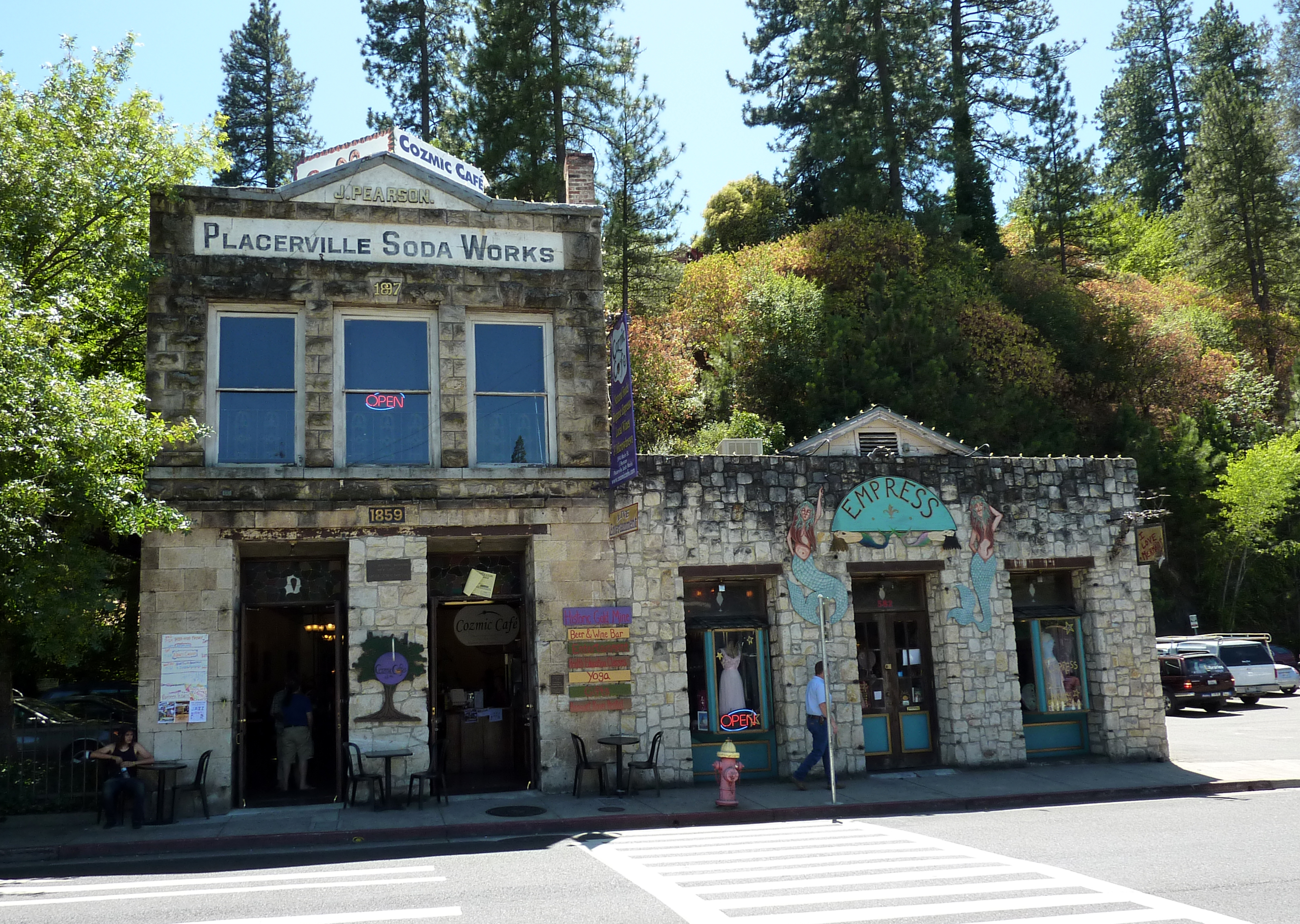
John Pearson Soda Works

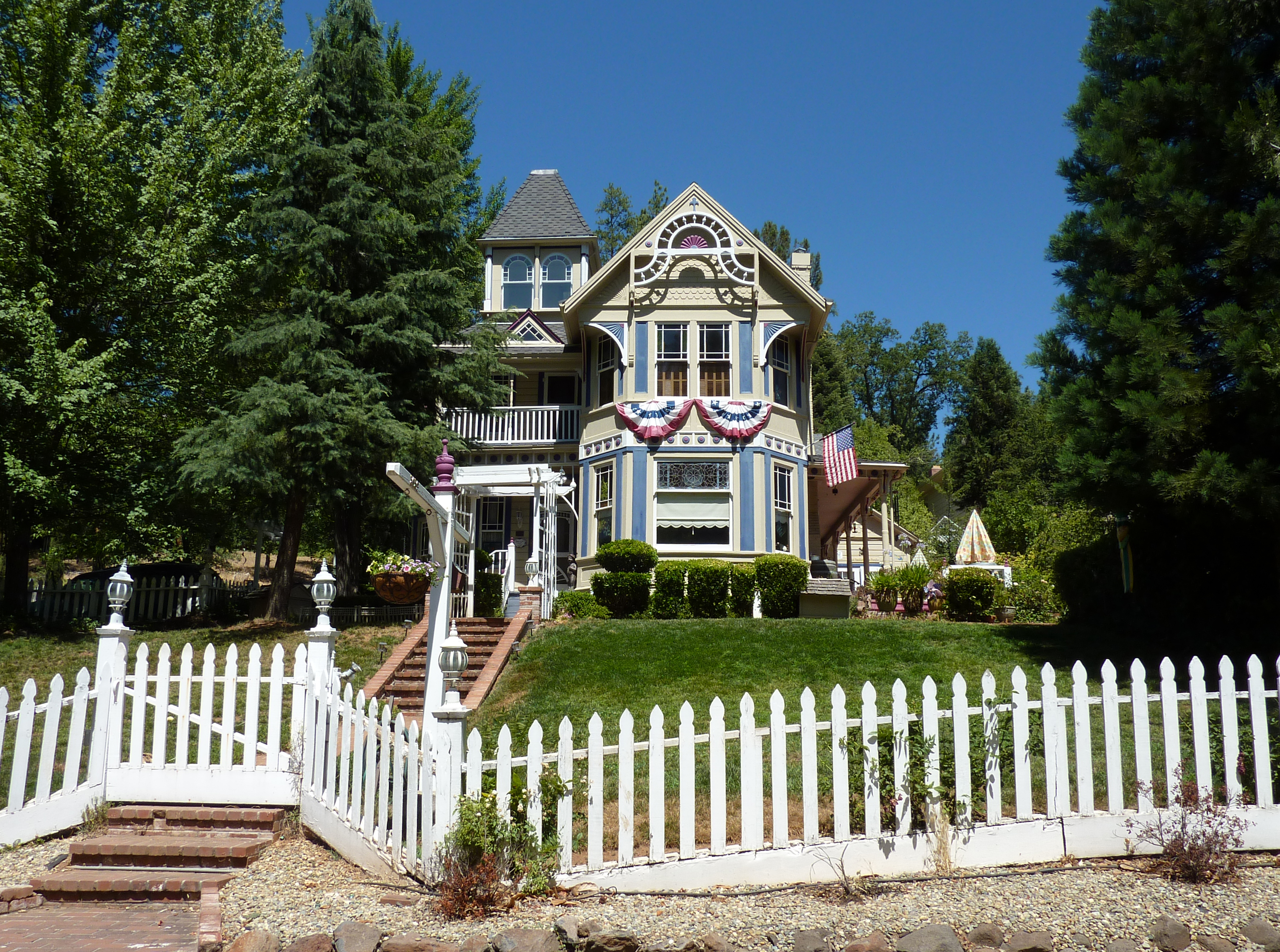
Combellack-Blair House

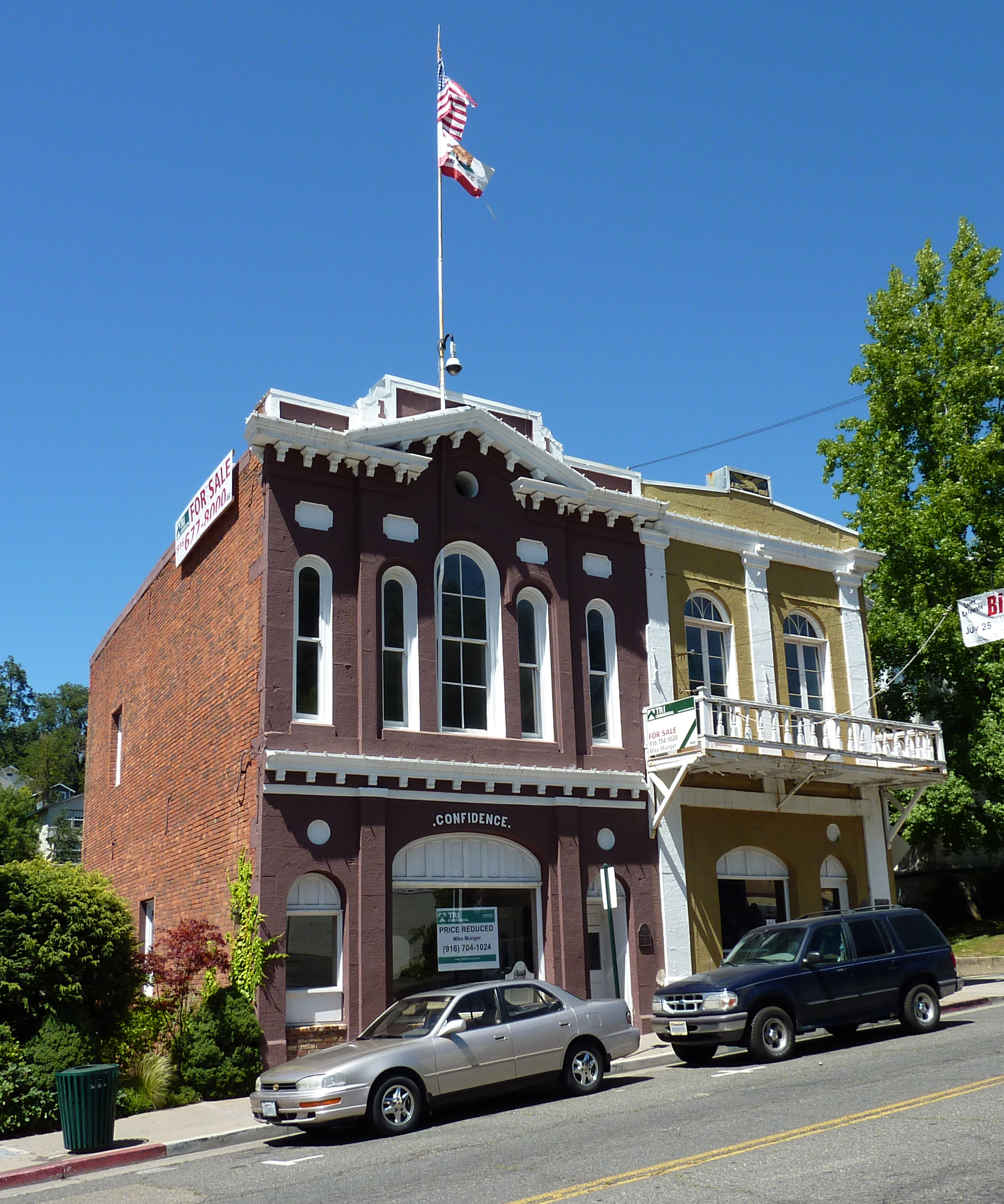
Confidence Hall

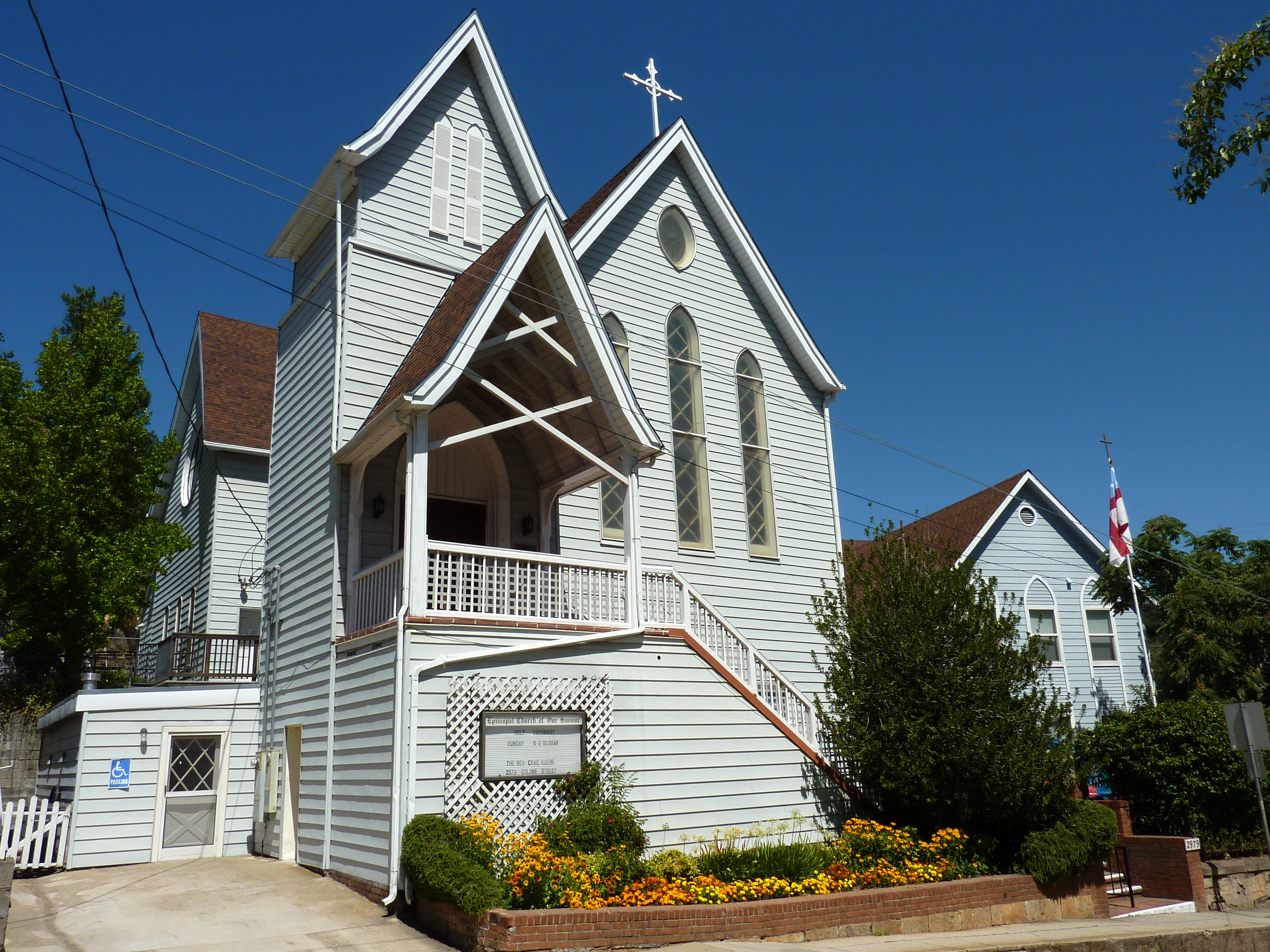
Church of Our Saviour

== Geography ==
Placerville is located in the Sierra Nevada foothills where U.S. Route 50 crosses State Route 49. It is the location of three traffic signals along U.S. Route 50, which is otherwise a freeway.

Downtown Placerville is about 1,867 feet (569 m) above sea level, while unincorporated areas of the city range from 1,800 feet (550 m) to nearly 4,000 feet (1,200 m).

According to the United States Census Bureau, the city has a total area of 5.8 square miles (15 km^{2}), over 99% of it land.

== Climate ==
Placerville has cool, frequently wet winters and hot, dry summers, creating a typically Californian Mediterranean climate (Köppen Csa). Average January temperatures are a maximum of 53.4 °F (11.9 °C) and a minimum of 32.5 °F (0.3 °C). Average July temperatures are a maximum of 92.7 °F (33.7 °C) and a minimum of 57.2 °F (14.0 °C). Annually, there are an average of 65.7 days with highs of 90 °F (32 °C) or higher and 61.3 mornings with lows of 32 °F (0 °C) or lower. The record high temperature was 114 °F (46 °C) on July 4, 1911. The record low temperature was 8 °F (−13.3 °C) on December 9, 1972.

Average annual rainfall in Placerville is 38.11 inches (968.0 mm). There are an average of 66 days with measurable rain. The wettest calendar year was 1983 with 74.55 inches (1,893.6 mm) and the driest 1976 with 11.85 inches (301 mm). The most rainfall in one month was 23.29 inches (591.6 mm) in December 1955. The most rainfall in 24 hours was 6.22 inches (158 mm) on February 14, 2000. Although snowfall is rare in Placerville, heavy amounts often fall in the mountains east of the city.

Climate data for Placerville, California (1915–2005)
Month	Jan	Feb	Mar	Apr	May	Jun	Jul	Aug	Sep	Oct	Nov	Dec	Year
Record high °F (°C)	75 (24)	78 (26)	87 (31)	92 (33)	104 (40)	109 (43)	110 (43)	109 (43)	108 (42)	100 (38)	83 (28)	76 (24)	110 (43)
Mean daily maximum °F (°C)	53.3 (11.8)	56.9 (13.8)	60.2 (15.7)	66.3 (19.1)	74.5 (23.6)	83.7 (28.7)	92.4 (33.6)	91.3 (32.9)	85.5 (29.7)	74.8 (23.8)	61.1 (16.2)	53.9 (12.2)	71.2 (21.8)
Daily mean °F (°C)	42.8 (6.0)	45.8 (7.7)	48.8 (9.3)	53.3 (11.8)	60.3 (15.7)	67.7 (19.8)	74.8 (23.8)	73.6 (23.1)	68.5 (20.3)	59.8 (15.4)	49.0 (9.4)	43.4 (6.3)	57.3 (14.1)
Mean daily minimum °F (°C)	32.4 (0.2)	34.7 (1.5)	37.4 (3.0)	40.3 (4.6)	46.0 (7.8)	51.6 (10.9)	56.8 (13.8)	55.9 (13.3)	51.5 (10.8)	44.7 (7.1)	37.1 (2.8)	32.9 (0.5)	43.4 (6.4)
Record low °F (°C)	9 (−13)	15 (−9)	19 (−7)	24 (−4)	29 (−2)	31 (−1)	38 (3)	37 (3)	33 (1)	23 (−5)	21 (−6)	8 (−13)	8 (−13)
Average rainfall inches (mm)	7.05 (179)	6.70 (170)	5.85 (149)	3.09 (78)	1.52 (39)	0.46 (12)	0.08 (2.0)	0.09 (2.3)	0.56 (14)	2.12 (54)	4.52 (115)	6.52 (166)	38.56 (980.3)
Average snowfall inches (cm)	1.2 (3.0)	0.4 (1.0)	0.4 (1.0)	0.3 (0.76)	0 (0)	0 (0)	0 (0)	0 (0)	0 (0)	0 (0)	0 (0)	0.4 (1.0)	2.7 (6.76)
Average rainy days	10	10	10	7	4	2	0	1	1	4	7	10	66
Source: PLACERVILLE, CALIFORNIA (046960)

== Demographics ==
Historical population
Census	Pop.	Note	%±
1860	2,466		—
1870	1,562		−36.7%
1880	1,951		24.9%
1890	1,690		−13.4%
1900	1,748		3.4%
1910	1,914		9.5%
1920	1,650		−13.8%
1930	2,322		40.7%
1940	3,064		32.0%
1950	3,749		22.4%
1960	4,439		18.4%
1970	5,416		22.0%
1980	6,739		24.4%
1990	8,355		24.0%
2000	9,610		15.0%
2010	10,389		8.1%
2020	10,747		3.4%
U.S. Decennial Census

=== 2020 census ===
As of the 2020 census, Placerville had a population of 10,747. The population density was 1,840.2 inhabitants per square mile (710.5/km^{2}). The median age was 43.3 years. About 20.1% of residents were under the age of 18 and 24.0% were 65 years of age or older. For every 100 females, there were 88.6 males, and for every 100 females age 18 and over, there were 86.4 males age 18 and over.

The census reported that 96.0% of the population lived in households, 0.6% lived in non-institutionalized group quarters, and 3.4% were institutionalized. In addition, 99.6% of residents lived in urban areas, while 0.4% lived in rural areas.

There were 4,570 households, out of which 26.7% had children under the age of 18. Of all households, 38.0% were married-couple households, 8.1% were cohabiting couple households, 35.3% had a female householder with no spouse or partner present, and 18.7% had a male householder with no spouse or partner present. About 34.5% of households were one person, and 19.5% were one person aged 65 or older. The average household size was 2.26. There were 2,648 families (57.9% of all households).

There were 4,849 housing units at an average density of 830.3 units per square mile (320.6 units/km^{2}). Of the 4,570 occupied housing units, 54.1% were owner-occupied and 45.9% were occupied by renters. Overall, 5.8% of housing units were vacant; the homeowner vacancy rate was 1.5% and the rental vacancy rate was 3.7%.

Racial composition as of the 2020 census
Race	Number	Percent
White	8,202	76.3%
Black or African American	77	0.7%
American Indian and Alaska Native	158	1.5%
Asian	119	1.1%
Native Hawaiian and Other Pacific Islander	13	0.1%
Some other race	947	8.8%
Two or more races	1,231	11.5%
Hispanic or Latino (of any race)	2,015	18.7%

== Government ==
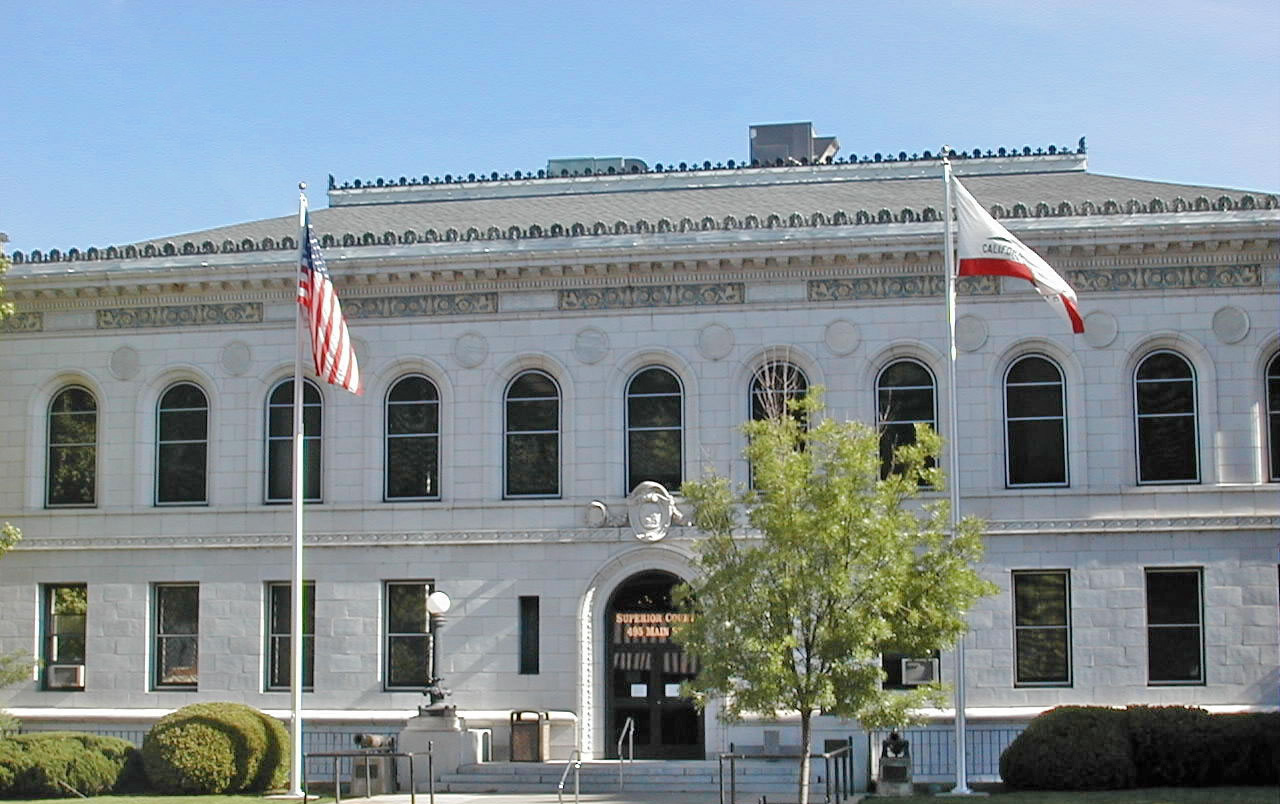
El Dorado County Courthouse.

In the California State Legislature, Placerville is in the 4th senatorial district, represented by Republican Marie Alvarado-Gil, and the 5th Assembly district, represented by Republican Joe Patterson.

In the United States House of Representatives, Placerville is in California's 5th congressional district, represented by Republican Tom McClintock.

== Economy ==
The region east of Placerville, popularly known as Apple Hill and Pleasant Valley, is becoming a center for wine production. The wine region is officially designated as the El Dorado AVA. The largest wineries in the area are Boeger, Lava Cap and Madroña, but most of the 30 plus wineries surrounding Placerville are family owned and smaller in wine grape and wine production. The region is "renown[ed] for making vibrantly flavorful, distinctly delicious wines, grown in the dramatic elevations of the Sierra Nevada." The area is increasingly a center for sophisticated production of Rhone style wines, noted by El Dorado County having a local chapter of the Rhone Rangers winemaker association.

Formerly known as Anderson Field, the arena and main grandstand that is now known as Placerville Speedway was originally built by the El Dorado County Fair during the winter months of 1956. Constructing a clay racing surface around the perimeter of the football field, Warren Jewitt and Bruno Romani created what was originally known as "Hangtown Speedway". Auto racing took place here for the first time on June 18, 1965.

Since 1965, Placerville Speedway has hosted several racing divisions. The track was cut out of a hillside, giving it higher banking, and covered with a dark red clay racing surface.

Placerville is home to the Mountain Democrat, the oldest continuously published newspaper in California, and Marshall Medical Center.

== Transportation ==

Placerville is served by two major highways. California State Route 49 runs north and south, connecting the city with the other major communities in the Sierra Nevada foothills. U.S. Route 50 heads west to Sacramento and east to South Lake Tahoe. This portion of U.S. Route 50 is a part of the Lincoln Highway.

El Dorado Transit runs public bus service, both local routes connecting Placerville to other populated areas on the western slope and weekday commuter service to/from Sacramento, including the 20 bus to Iron Point Station.

Amtrak Thruway 20C provides a daily connection to Sacramento Valley Station to the west, and South Lake Tahoe to the east, with a few stops in between.

Placerville is served by the Placerville Airport. A "Good Neighbor" airport (one that takes measures for noise abatement), it has a 4,200-foot-long (1,300 m) runway, but is not currently served by any commercial air transport.

== Culture ==
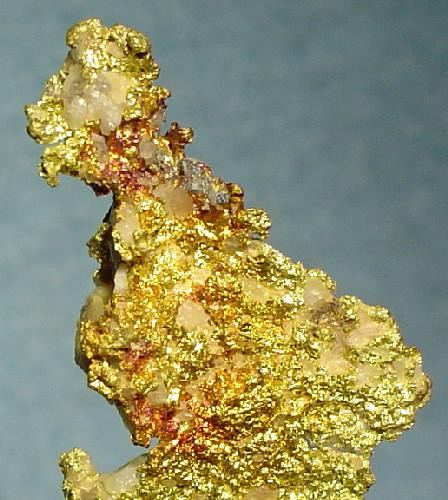
Gold specimen from Placerville

Placerville has many old buildings from the Gold Rush days. A walk down Main Street also reveals many historical markers, signifying spots of certain events or persons of importance during this period. Placerville was also on the line of the Pony Express, a short-lived mail carrier service that connected California to the Midwest and East (Sacramento, California to St. Joseph, Missouri).

Historically, Placerville was often referred to by the name "Hangtown," because of the 3 unfortunates that were hanged after being caught for cattle rustling by locals. Those traveling in the area can still see the site of the hangman's platform that was used for public hangings along with a commemorative mannequin ("George") hanging from a noose above the Old Hangman's Tree (now an ice cream parlor). The dummy enjoyed a brief hiatus when town officials attempted to freshen up the town's image before returning due to popular demand. In 2015 the dummy was stolen. It has since been replaced. In April 2021, the city council agreed unanimously to remove the noose from the city's logo.

Placerville is home to the legendary dish known as the "Hangtown fry" which includes eggs, bacon, and oysters. There are multiple legends regarding the origin, but all stories agree that Placerville is the place of origin.

The Southern Pacific Transportation Company branch line was purchased from the Union Pacific in 1996 for $14 million (~$26.5 million in 2025) by the Joint Powers Authority consisting of Sacramento County, Folsom, and El Dorado County. The line is being converted to a hiking and biking trail, with over 12 miles of the rail line now paved as a Class 1 biking route.

Placerville is the home of United Ancient Order of Druids of California Grove No. 1, which was established in 1860 as the first Druid hall in California. It was reinstated in 2017–18, along with several other historical fraternal societies. Main Street Placerville features a large stone column holding a glass and metal "torch" known as "The Druid Monument", commemorating the Order's inception there 1860. The City of Placerville is currently attempting to repave the roundabout containing the monument, possibly removing it permanently in the process—a proposal that has divided the community.

== Education ==
The vast majority of Placerville is in Placerville Union Elementary School District while a small piece is in Mother Lode Union Elementary School District. All of the city is in the El Dorado Union High School District.

== Notable people ==
Over the years many influential people had shops in Placerville, mostly along the now historic Main Street.

- Horace Bell (1830–1918), lawyer, journalist, historian
- Amy Bruni, Ghost Hunters television series, investigator.
- T. J. Caystile (1848–1884), newspaperman, printer
- Dan Crary (born 1939), bluegrass flat-picking guitarist, retired PhD professor of communications at Cal State Fullerton.
- John Thomas Dunlop (1914–2003), politician, born in Placerville
- Oliver Gagliani (1917–2002), photographer, born in Placerville
- Toby Hall (born 1975), baseball player
- Henry Hooker (1829–1907), cattle baron
- Mark Hopkins Jr. (1813–1878), railroad financier and businessman, lived in Placerville in the 1850s.
- Thomas Kinkade (1958–2012), painter
- John William Kelley (born 1963), serial killer
- Bevo LeBourveau (1896–1947), baseball player, later a policeman in Placerville
- Edwin Markham (1852–1940), poet, member of the Placerville Masonic Lodge.
- Alexander Howison Murray Jr. (1907–1993), also known as "Sandy Murray," mayor
- Nello Olivo (1879–?), winemaker
- Ziba Peterson (?–1849)— early American Latter Day Saint, sheriff during the 1849 hanging.
- John Augustus Raffetto (1864–1954), hotelier and banker, founded the First National Bank of Placerville.
- Michael Raffetto (1899–1990), radio star, born in Placerville.
- Spider Sabich (1945–1976), ski racer from Kyburz - buried in Placerville
- Levi Strauss (1829–1902), businessman and clothing maker.
- John Studebaker (1833–1917), auto maker.
- Daniel Trudeau (born 1986), musician, artist
- Ralph Taeger (1936–2015), actor; operated Taeger's Firewood Company in Placerville
- Jerome R. Waldie (1925–2009), U.S. Representative from California
- Jesse Yarnell (1837–1906), newspaperman, established the Daily News in Placerville.

== Gallery ==
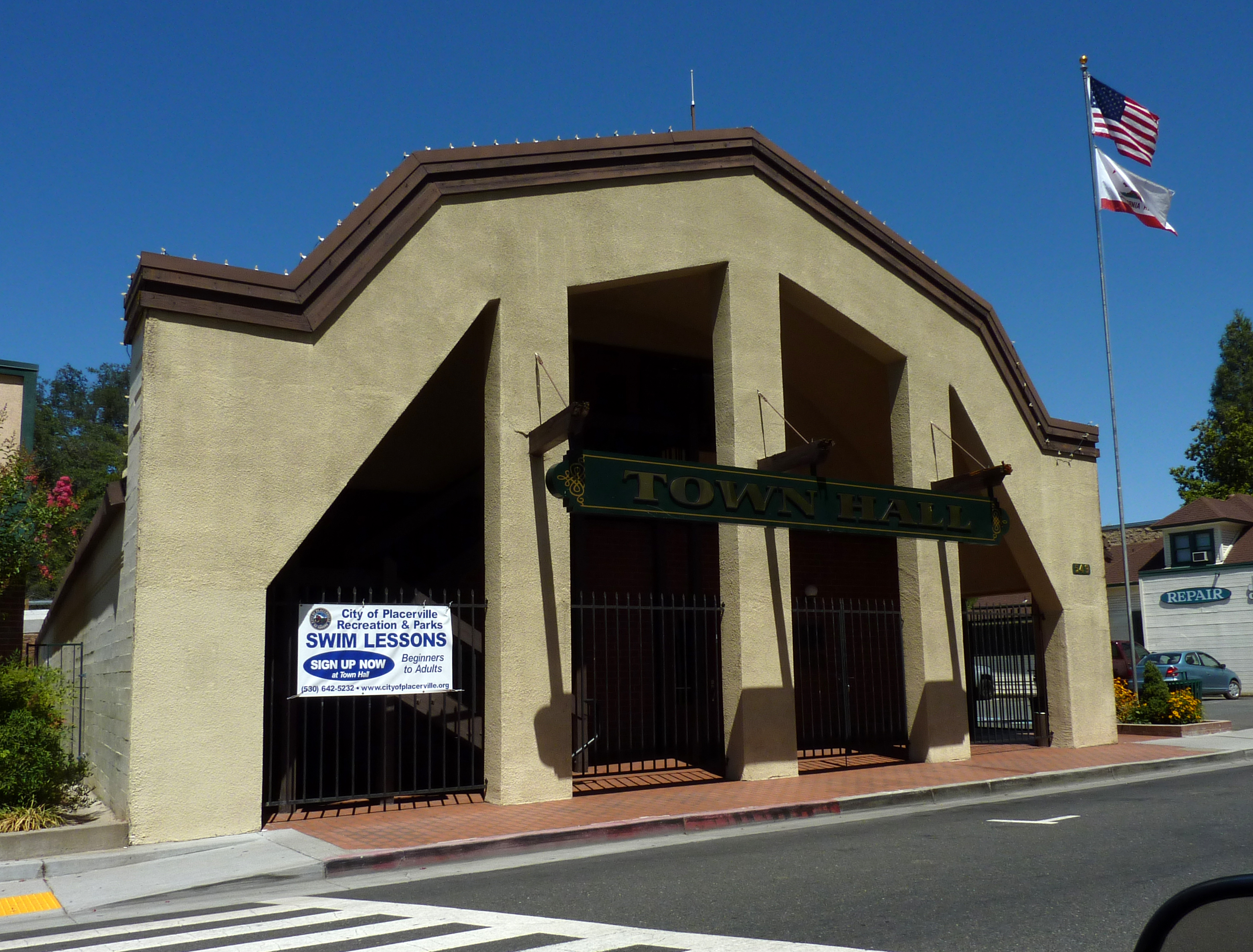
Town Hall

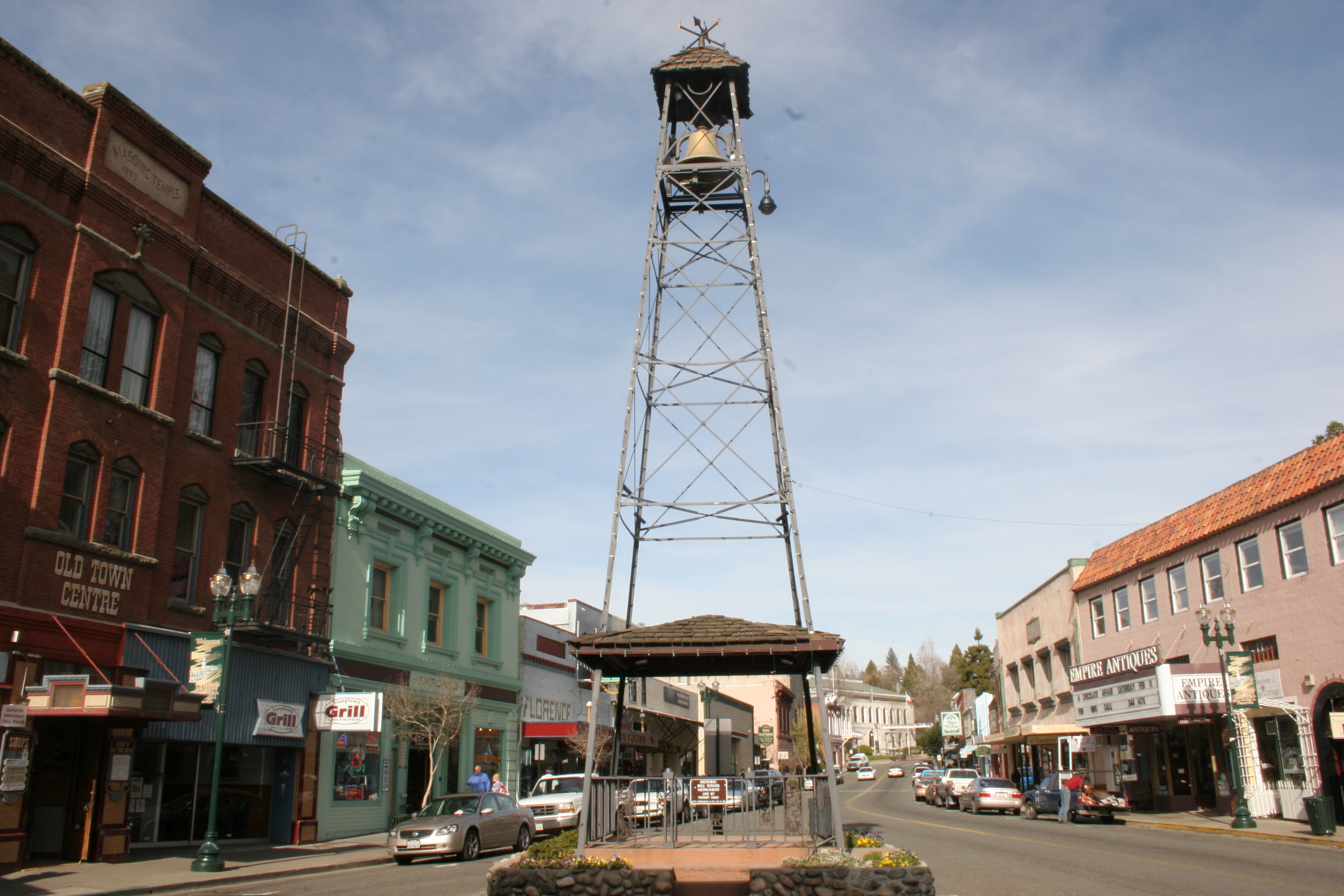
Placerville bell

== See also ==
- Community Observatory
- Placerville Mountain Democrat
- Placerville Pioneer Jewish Cemetery
