= Dogtown, California =

Dogtown, California may refer to:

- Dogtown, El Dorado County, California, a former settlement and mining camp
- Dogtown, Marin County, California, an unincorporated community
- Dogtown, Mariposa County, California, an unincorporated community
- Dogtown, Mono County, California, a ghost town
- Dogtown, San Joaquin County, California, a census designated place
- Dogtown, Tulare County, California, a ghost town
- Dogtown, Oakland, California, a neighborhood
- Garberville, California, formerly called Dogtown
- Harris, California, formerly called Dogtown
- Magalia, California, formerly called Dogtown
- Santa Monica, California, nicknamed Dogtown
- William Mead Homes, north of Los Angeles, nicknamed Dogtown

== See also ==
- Dogtown (disambiguation)
- Dogtown and Z-Boys, a 2001 documentary film
- Lords of Dogtown, a 2005 American biographical drama film
- Santa Monica neighborhoods#Ocean Park Neighborhood
