= Dogtown =

Dogtown or Dog Town may refer to:

== Entertainment ==
- Dogtown, a 1902 novel by Mabel Osgood Wright
- Dogtown (film), a 1997 film
- Dogtown: Death and Enchantment in a New England Ghost Town, a 2009 book by Elyssa East
- "Dogtown" (The Simpsons), a 2017 season episode
- DogTown, a National Geographic Channel series
- Dogtown, a 2006 television show, starring Geraldine McNulty
- "Dogtown", a song by Harry Chapin from the album Heads & Tales (1972)
- "Dogtown", a song by Yoko Ono, first released on the album Season of Glass
- "Dogtown", a song by The Fratellis from the album Eyes Wide, Tongue Tied (2015)
- Dogtown Records, a record label established by musician Byard Lancaster, active in the 1970s

== Places ==
- Dogtown, former name of Okanagan Falls, British Columbia
- Dogtown, DeKalb County, Alabama, an unincorporated community in DeKalb County
- Dogtown, Walker County, Alabama, an unincorporated community in Walker County
- Dogtown, California (disambiguation), the name or nickname of several places in California
- Dog Town, California
- Dogtown, El Dorado County, California
- Dogtown, Marin County, California
- Dogtown, Mariposa County, California
- Dogtown, San Joaquin County, California
- Dogtown, Tulare County, California
- Dogtown, Florida, a community in Gadsden County, Florida
- Dogtown, Massachusetts, a ghost town
- Dogtown, Mississippi, a ghost town in Lafayette County, Mississippi
- Dogtown, St. Louis, Missouri, Irish section comprising several neighborhoods in Missouri
  - Dogtown, Clayton/Tamm, St. Louis, a neighborhood in the above
- Dogtown, a nickname for Upper South Providence, Providence, Rhode Island

== Other uses ==
- Dog town, a colloquial name for a colony of prairie dogs

== See also ==
- Dogtown and Z-Boys (2001), a 2001 documentary film about skateboarding
- Lords of Dogtown (2005), a 2005 film based on Dogtown and Z-Boys
