= Caldor (disambiguation) =

Caldor may refer to:

- Caldor, a defunct chain of US discount department stores
- Caldor Fire, a 2021 wildfire in Eldorado County, California
- Caldor, California, a former company town in Eldorado County, California
- Diamond and Caldor Railway, a defunct common carrier railroad in Eldorado County, California
