= Caldor Fire =

2021 wildfire in Northern California

- Part of the 2021 California wildfires
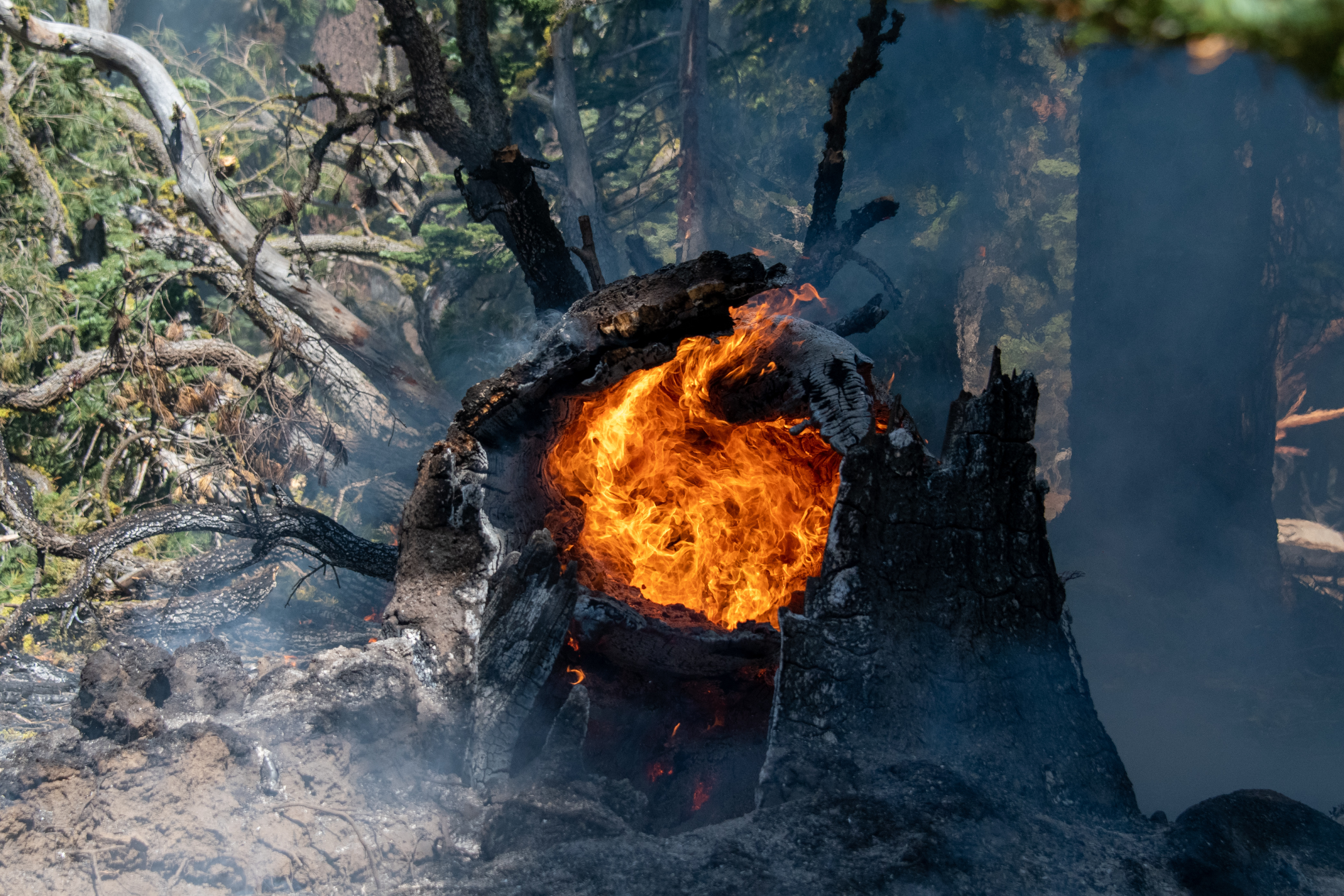
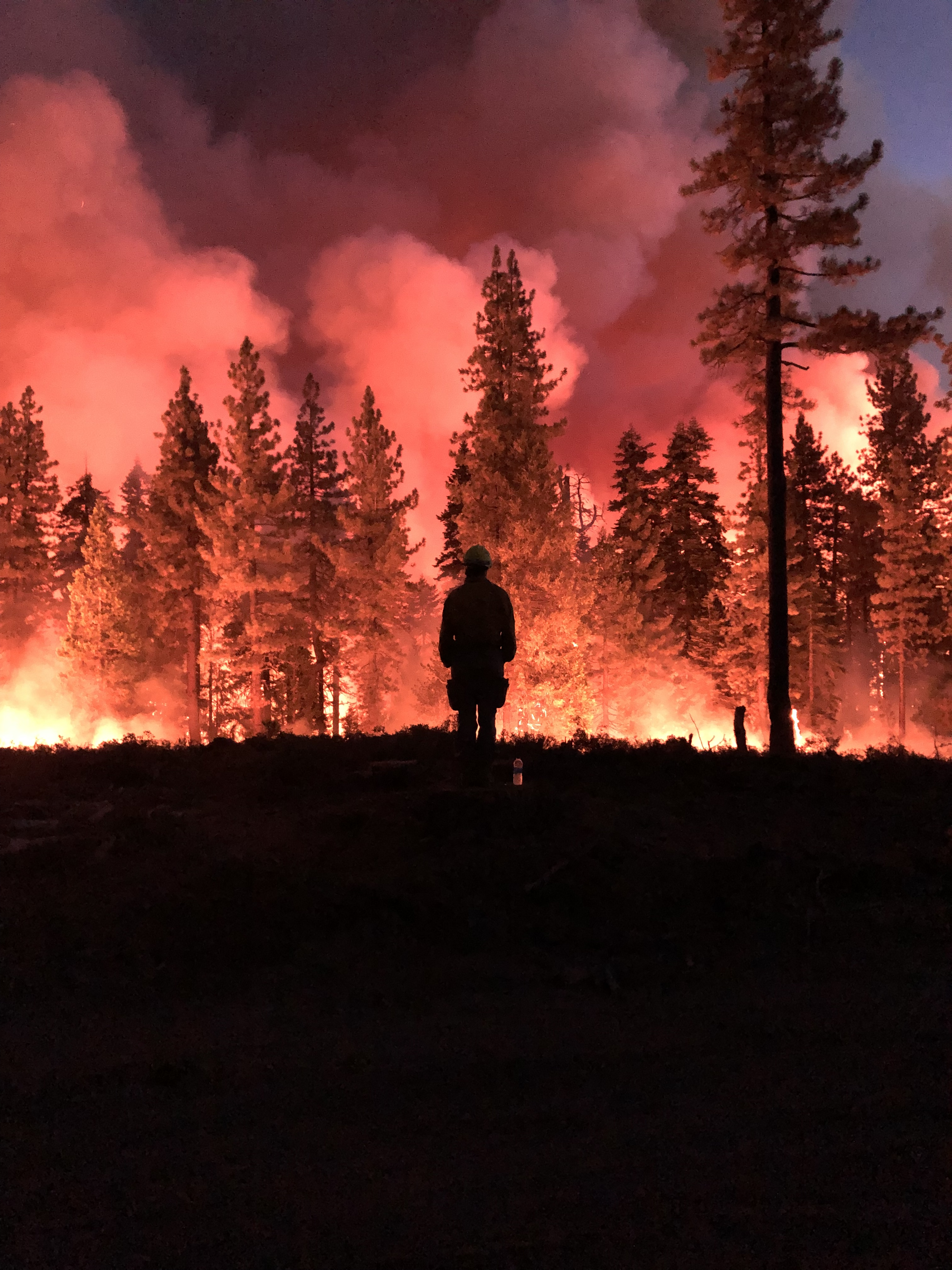
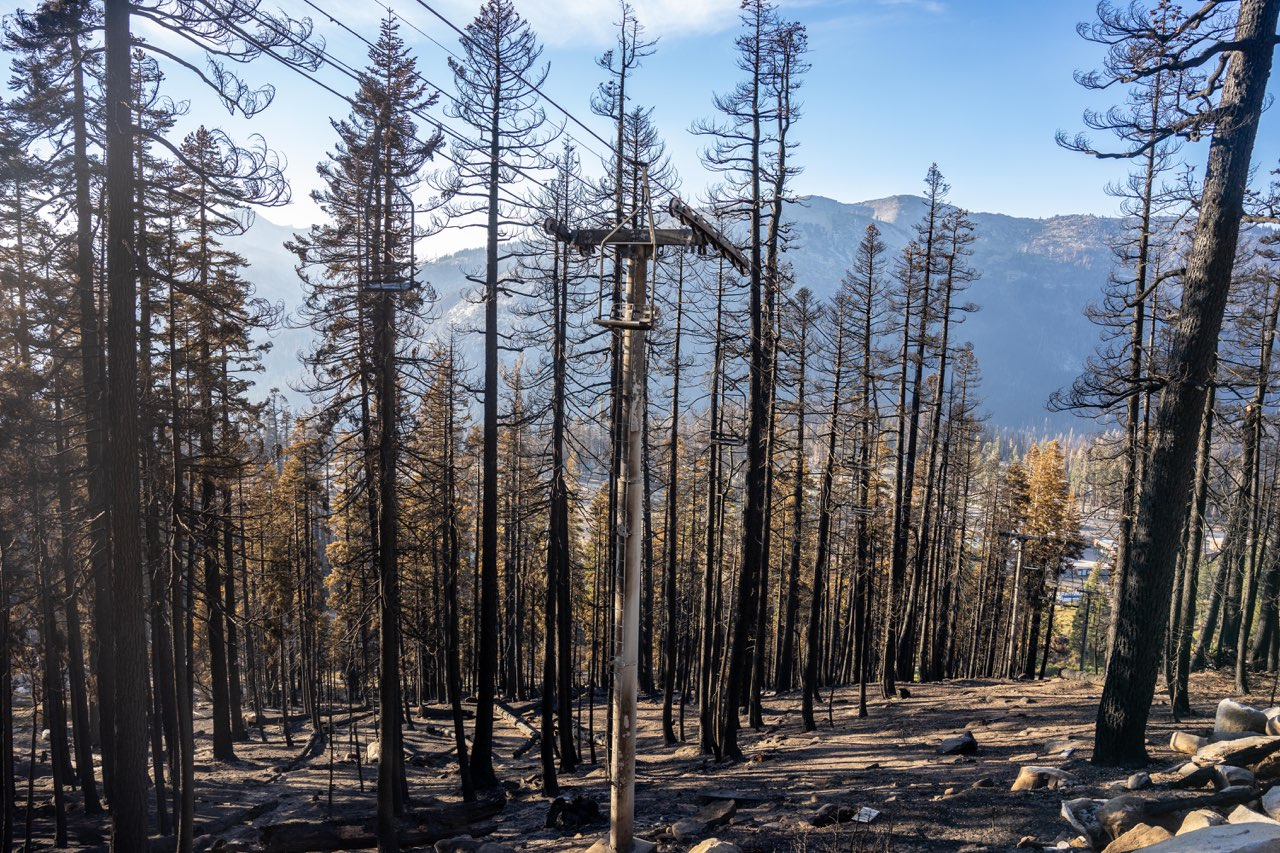
- Top: A stump continues to burn vigorously as the Aravipa hotshot crew works on the fireline; Bottom left: A firefighter monitors the control line during night-time burning operations; Bottom right: A ski lift near South Lake Tahoe among stands of burned trees after the fire
- Date: August 14 –; October 21, 2021; (69 days)
- Location: El Dorado, Amador, and Alpine counties, California, United States
- Coordinates: 38.584°N 120.534°W

Statistics
- Burned area: 221,835 acres (89,773 ha; 347 sq mi; 898 km^{2})

Impacts
- Deaths: 0
- Injuries: 21
- Evacuated: >53,000
- Structures destroyed: 1,003
- Cost: $1.2 billion (2021 USD)

Ignition
- Cause: Unknown

Map
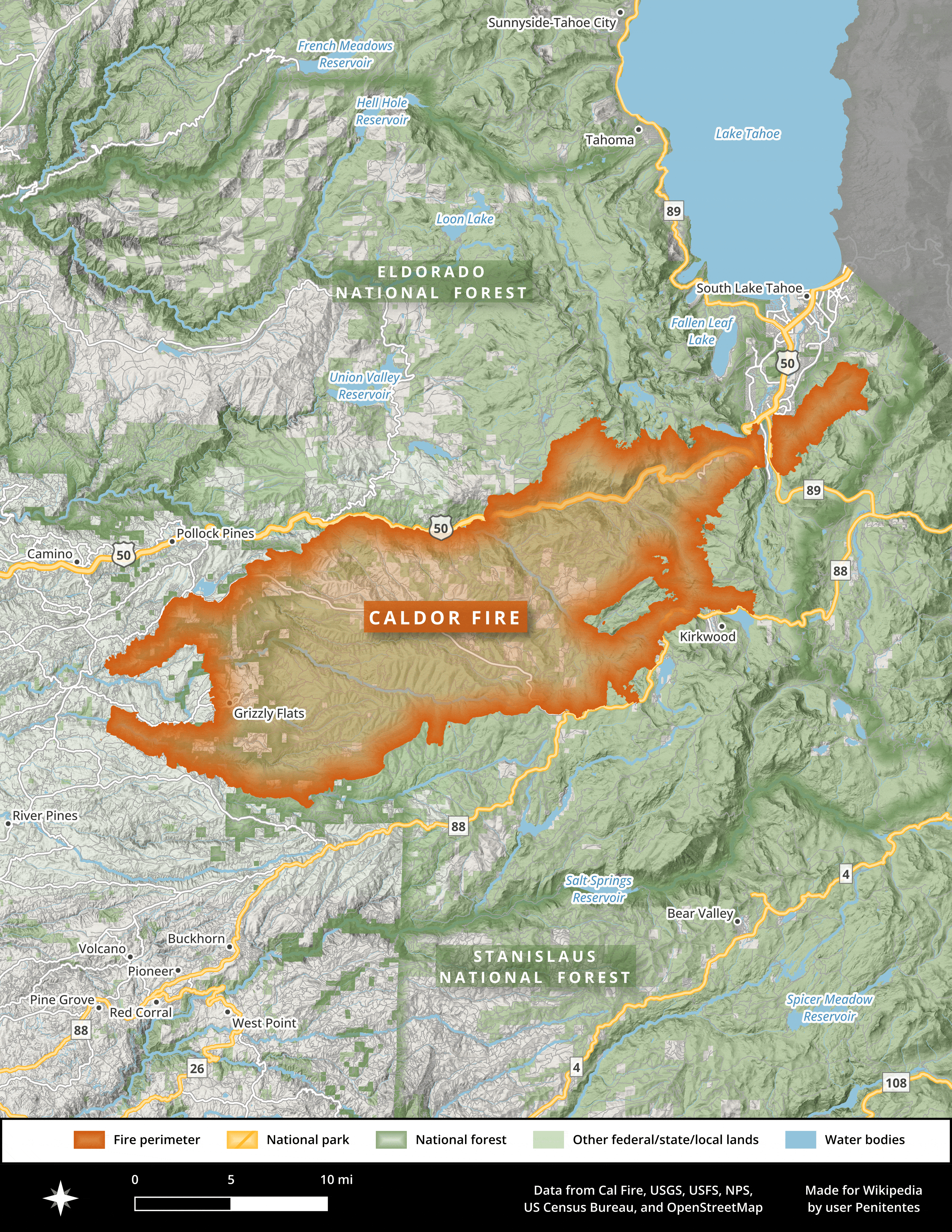
- The Caldor Fire's footprint spanned the Sierra Nevada, largely between Highways 50 and 88

- The general location of the fire in Northern California

The Caldor Fire was a large wildfire that burned 221,835 acres (89,773 hectares) in the Eldorado National Forest and other areas of the Sierra Nevada in El Dorado, Amador, and Alpine County, California, in the United States during the 2021 California wildfire season. The fire was first reported on Saturday, August 14, 2021, and was fully contained on Thursday, October 21, 2021. The Caldor Fire destroyed 1,005 structures and damaged 81 more, primarily in the US Highway 50 corridor and in the community of Grizzly Flats, 2/3 of which was destroyed by the fire.

On August 30, it became the second fire known to cross the Sierra Nevada mountain range, following the Dixie Fire, which crossed a few days earlier on August 18. It then threatened the communities of Meyers and South Lake Tahoe, causing evacuations to be ordered for more than 20,000 people before the fire's progress was halted. The Caldor Fire was the third-largest and second-most-destructive of the 2021 season in California, and is the seventeenth-largest and sixteenth-most destructive in recorded California history.

The U.S. Forest Service determined that the fire was caused by a bullet. A father and son who had called 911 to report the fire were accused of starting it by reckless use of firearms. In January 2024, a judge ruled that there was insufficient evidence to try them.

== Background ==
The old logging town of Caldor is located near Omo Ranch, close to the origin of the fire. The town was part of the Diamond and Caldor Railway lumber route, running from Diamond Springs to Caldor. Originally called "Dogtown", the abandoned settlement was renamed after the new owners, the California Door Company.

== Progression ==
The Caldor Fire started on August 14, 2021, near Little Mountain, south of Pollock Pines in El Dorado County, about two miles east of Omo Ranch and four miles south of Grizzly Flats. It initially burned slowly, where little attention was given to it because of other larger fires, but exploded in size on August 16 due to high winds and high fuel loads in the area. By the night of August 16 it was 6,500 acres (2,600 ha). On August 17 the fire grew to 30,000 acres (12,000 ha) as it expanded rapidly north and east, crossing the North Fork Cosumnes River and approaching Sly Park Reservoir. By August 20, the fire had burned nearly to Highway 50, forcing a closure of the highway.

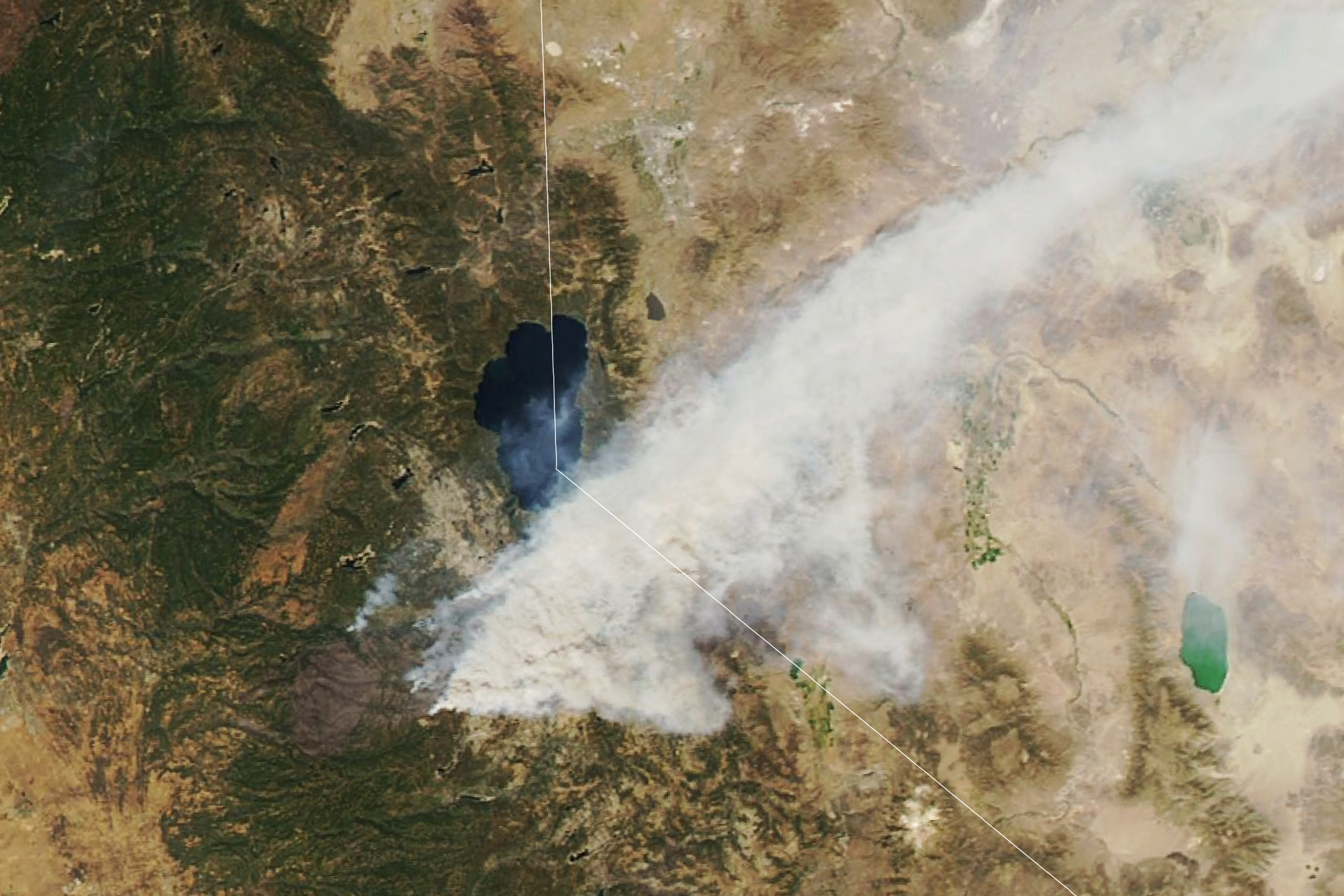
The Caldor Fire burning south of Lake Tahoe as seen from space on the afternoon of August 30, 2021

Over the next few days, the fire crossed Highway 50 in the vicinity of Kyburz. Starting on August 27, winds drove the fire rapidly east towards the Lake Tahoe Basin, devastating the once picturesque backdrop to the historic Strawberry Lodge near the Twin Bridges area. By August 30, it had reached Echo Summit, less than five miles (8.0 km) from South Lake Tahoe. While South Lake Tahoe remained at the evacuation warning stage during early morning briefings that day, the entire city of 22,000 people was ordered to evacuate at 10:59 a.m. Due to the focused efforts of fire crews aggressively thinning nearby forests, reducing earlier crown fires (typically 100–150 feet (30–46 meters) flames) to surface fires (typically 15 feet (4.6 meters) flames) and developing a fire perimeter, evacuation orders were lifted about one week later.

By October 2, the fire was at 221,775 acres and 91% containment. By that date, 782 structures were destroyed, 81 structures damaged, with 35 structures still threatened. Staffing was still at 1,589 personnel, with ten helicopters assigned to the incident.

A NASA image showing the progression of the Caldor Fire over the landscape between August 15 and October 6 in 12-hour increments

The Caldor Fire was fully contained on October 21, 2021. The area burned by the fire came to 221,835 acres (89,773 hectares).

== Effects ==
=== Casualties ===
According to Cal Fire, there were 21 total confirmed injuries among fire personnel and civilians. In September 2021 it was reported that 18 people had been injured due to the fire, the majority of them firefighters. Two people were injured in Grizzly Flats and were airlifted to hospitals.

=== Damage ===
The Caldor Fire destroyed 1,003 structures, many of them in Grizzly Flats when the fire destroyed two-thirds of the community in the early morning of August 17.

=== Evacuations and closures ===
On August 17, evacuations were ordered for Grizzly Flats, Somerset, Sly Park Reservoir and Pollock Pines. Governor Gavin Newsom declared a state of emergency for El Dorado County over a day later after the explosive growth. As of Sunday night (August 29), evacuation orders were sent out to some residents of the Tahoe Basin as well as locations in Amador County. By August 30, the number of people covered by evacuation orders in El Dorado County was more than 53,000.

=== Economic impacts ===
A private consulting firm estimated the total economic impact to the Tahoe region's economy, expressed as lost visitor spending due to evacuations and poor air quality, at $268 million.

=== Environmental impacts ===
There were concerns that runoff from the Caldor Fire's burned footprint would have negative impacts on the water quality of the Lake Tahoe watershed. However, in testing conducted by the League to Save Lake Tahoe in October after the fire was fully contained, it was found that there had been relatively little impact on the turbidity of Lake Tahoe's water.

== Cause ==
U.S. Forest Service investigators determined that the Caldor Fire was started by a bullet. Based on bullet casings, earplugs, electronic device location data, and DNA evidence from the scene, on December 8, 2021, a father and son were arrested and charged with reckless arson. Court filings stated that "the Caldor Fire likely ignited when a projectile discharged from a firearm and struck an object, causing heated fragments of the projectile to land in a dry receptive fuel bed, igniting the fuels". The two men's attorney stated that they had been in Eldorado National Forest in the Omo Ranch area on the day the fire began, were not guilty of starting it, and had called 911 to report it as soon as they had cell service. The suspects were held on $1 million bail, with a preliminary hearing scheduled for August 2023. After a hearing in December 2023, an El Dorado County judge ruled that there was insufficient evidence to try them in relation to the fire, but enough to charge them with weapons violations. They have pleaded not guilty on those charges. The weapons charges were dropped in April 2024.

== Growth and containment status ==
Fire containment status Gray: contained; Red: active; %: percent contained;
Date	Area burned in acres (ha)	Personnel	Containment
Aug 14	...	...	...
Aug 15	45 (18)	90 personnel	
Aug 16	754 (305)	285 personnel	
Aug 17	6,500 (2,600)	242 personnel	
Aug 18	53,772 (21,761)	242 personnel	
Aug 19	65,474 (26,496)	653 personnel	
Aug 20	73,415 (29,710)	1,118 personnel	
Aug 21	82,444 (33,364)	1,558 personnel	
Aug 22	98,149 (39,719)	1,604 personnel	
Aug 23	106,562 (43,124)	1,745 personnel	
Aug 24	117,704 (47,633)	2,119 personnel	
Aug 25	126,182 (51,064)	2,667 personnel	
Aug 26	136,643 (55,297)	2,897 personnel	
Aug 27	143,951 (58,255)	2,897 personnel	
Aug 28	149,684 (60,575)	3,302 personnel	
Aug 29	156,515 (63,339)	3,531 personnel	
Aug 30	177,260 (71,730)	3,531 personnel	
Aug 31	191,607 (77,541)	3,904 personnel	
Sep 1	204,390 (82,710)	4,224 personnel	
Sep 2	210,259 (85,089)	4,451 personnel	
Sep 3	212,907 (86,160)	4,415 personnel	
Sep 4	214,107 (86,646)	4,662 personnel	
Sep 5	215,400 (87,200)	4,954 personnel	
Sep 6	216,358 (87,557)	5,072 personnel	
Sep 7	216,646 (87,674)	4,723 personnel	
Sep 8	217,569 (88,047)	4,820 personnel	
Sep 9	217,946 (88,200)	4,532 personnel	
Sep 10	218,459 (88,407)	4,028 personnel	
Sep 11	218,489 (88,419)	3,989 personnel	
Sep 12	218,950 (88,610)	4,029 personnel	
Sep 13	219,267 (88,734)	3,771 personnel	
Sep 14	219,267 (88,734)	3,368 personnel	
Sep 15	219,267 (88,734)	3,010 personnel	
Sep 16	219,267 (88,734)	2,948 personnel	
Sep 17	218,857 (88,568)	2,702 personnel	
Sep 18	218,876 (88,576)	2,326 personnel	
Sep 19	218,876 (88,576)	2,118 personnel	
Sep 20	219,101 (88,667)	1,833 personnel	
Sep 21	219,231 (88,720)	1,534 personnel	
Sep 22	220,548 (89,253)	1,555 personnel	
Sep 23	221,161 (89,501)	1,400 personnel	
Sep 24	221,505 (89,640)	1,400 personnel	
Sep 25	221,595 (89,676)	1,503 personnel	
Sep 26	221,774 (89,749)	1,508 personnel	
Sep 27	221,774 (89,749)	1,490 personnel	
Sep 28	221,774 (89,749)	1,480 personnel	
Sep 29	...	...	...
Sep 30	221,775 (89,749)	1,527 personnel	
Oct 1	221,775 (89,749)	1,467 personnel	
Oct 2	221,775 (89,749)	1,589 personnel	
Oct 3	221,775 (89,749)	1,438 personnel	
Oct 4	221,775 (89,749)	1,336 personnel	
Oct 5	221,775 (89,749)	1,321 personnel	
Oct 6	221,775 (89,749)	1,308 personnel	
Oct 7	221,775 (89,749)	1,236 personnel	
Oct 8	221,775 (89,749)	1,142 personnel	
Oct 9	221,775 (89,749)	1,071 personnel	
Oct 10	221,775 (89,749)	1,071 personnel	
Oct 11	221,775 (89,749)	1,063 personnel	
Oct 12	221,775 (89,749)	1,074 personnel	
Oct 13	221,775 (89,749)	1,015 personnel	
Oct 14	221,798 (89,758)	917 personnel	
Oct 15	221,835 (89,773)	917 personnel	
Oct 16	...	...	...
Oct 17	221,835 (89,773)	681 personnel	
Oct 18	221,835 (89,773)	669 personnel	
Oct 19	221,835 (89,773)	651 personnel	
Oct 20	221,835 (89,773)	586 personnel	
Oct 21	221,835 (89,773)	526 personnel	

== Gallery of post-fire effects ==
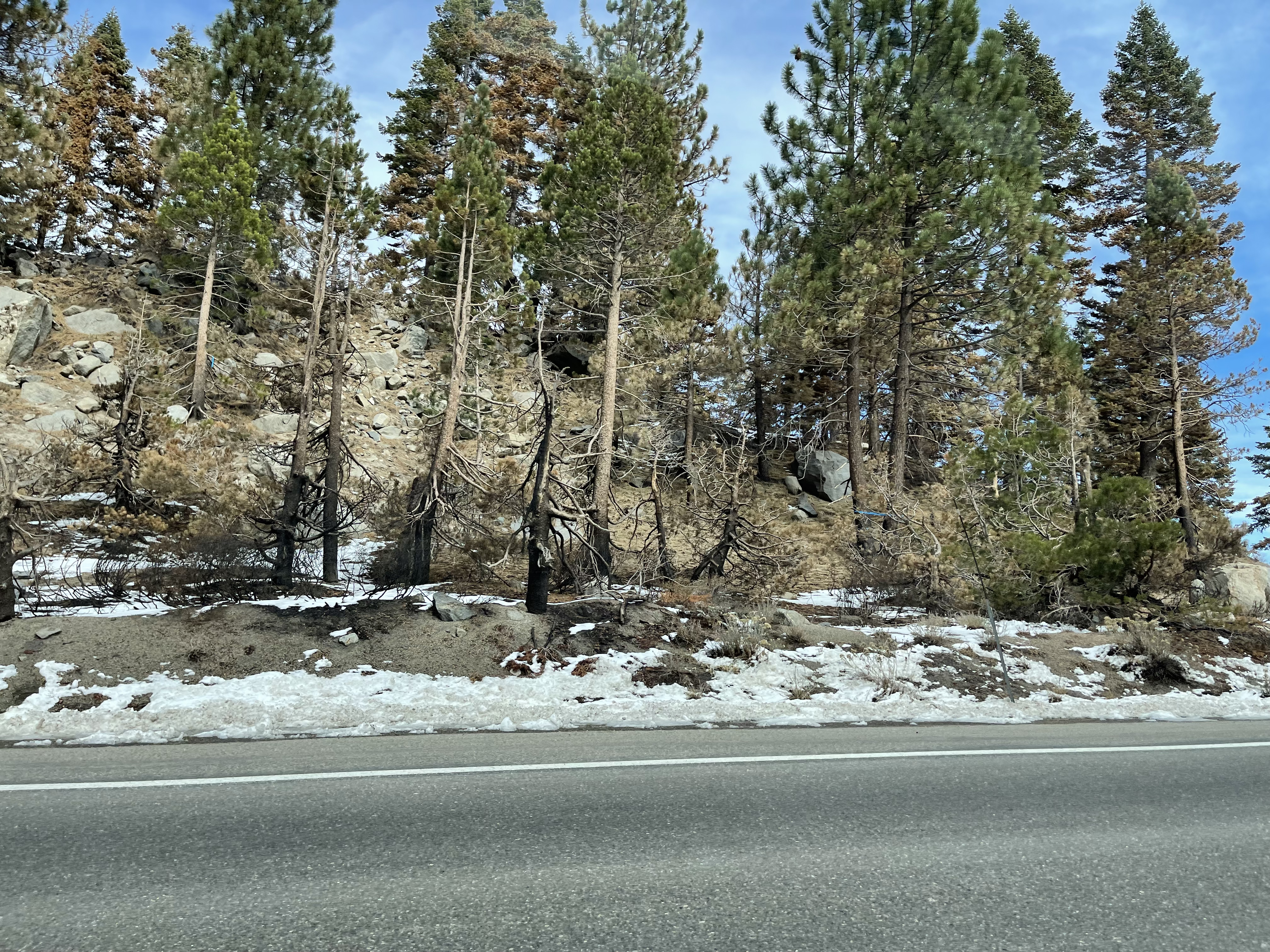

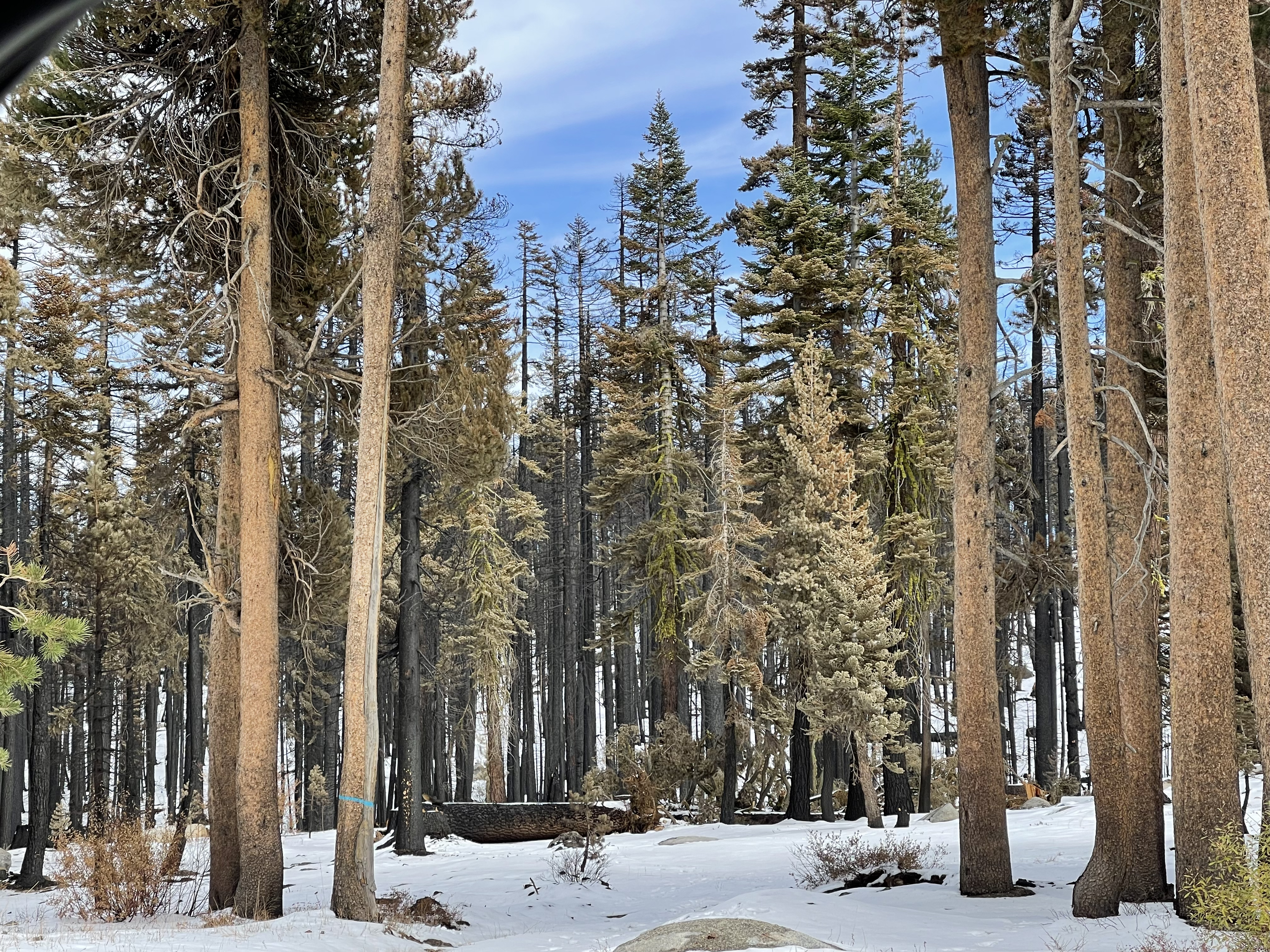

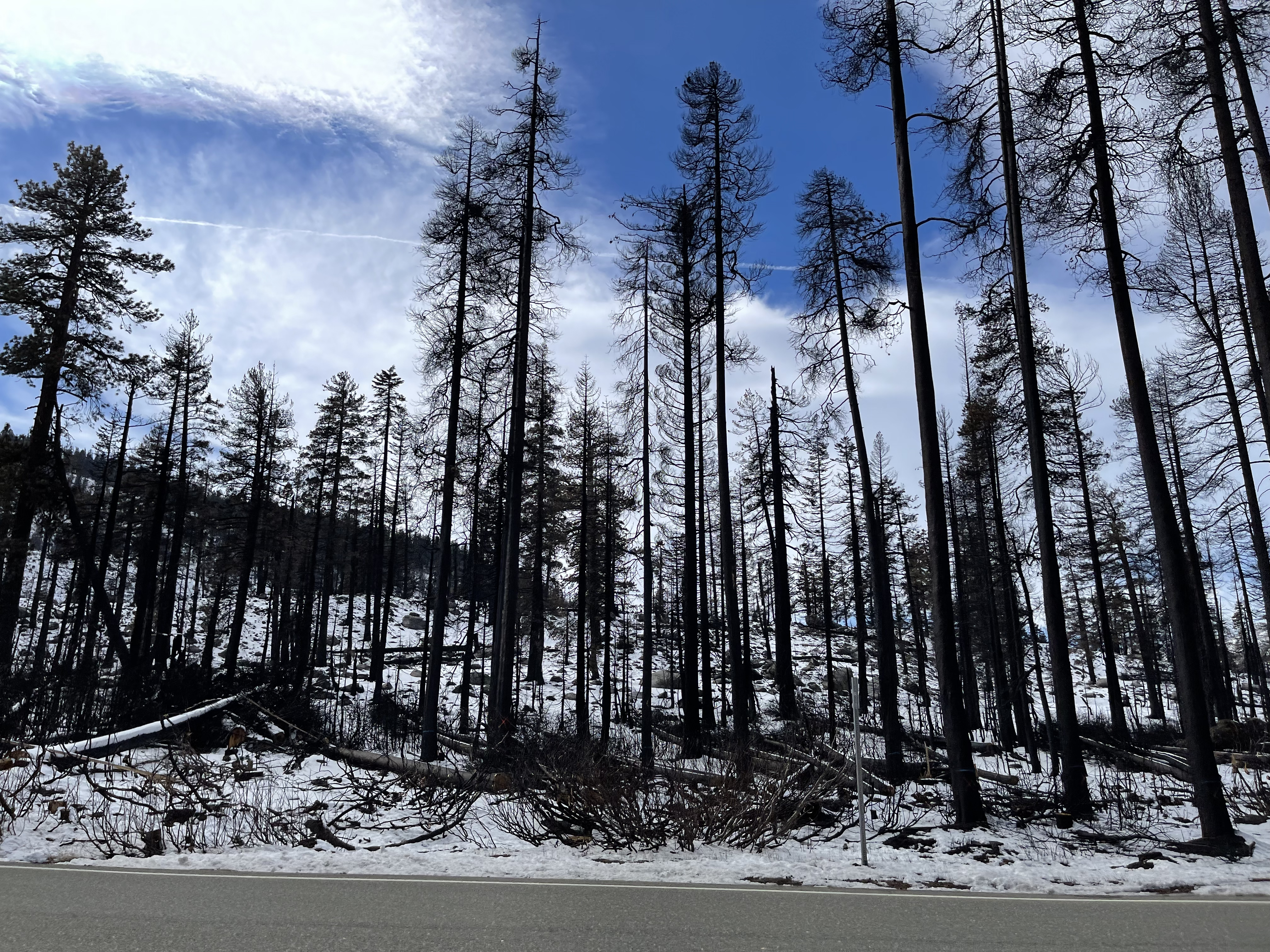

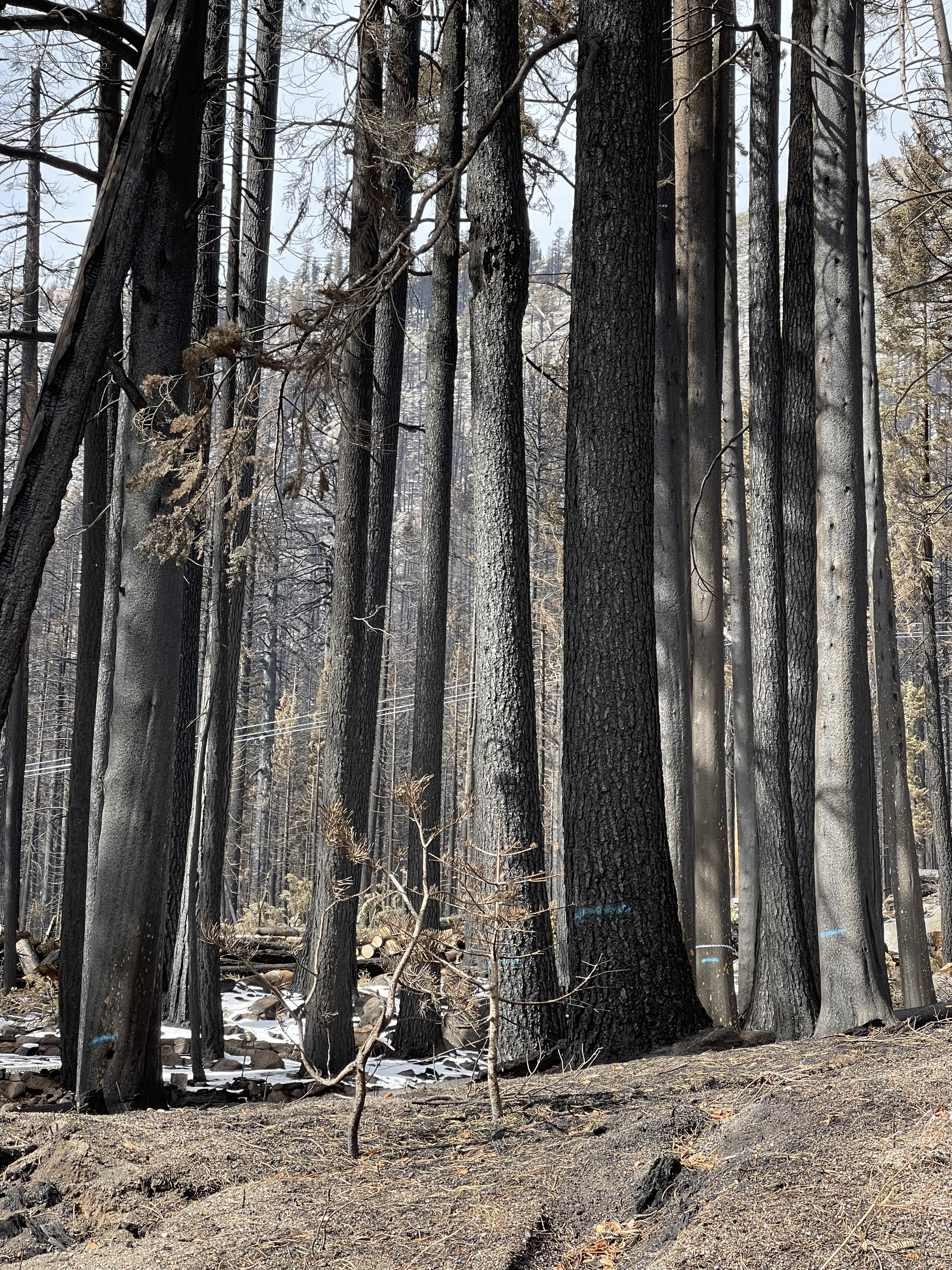

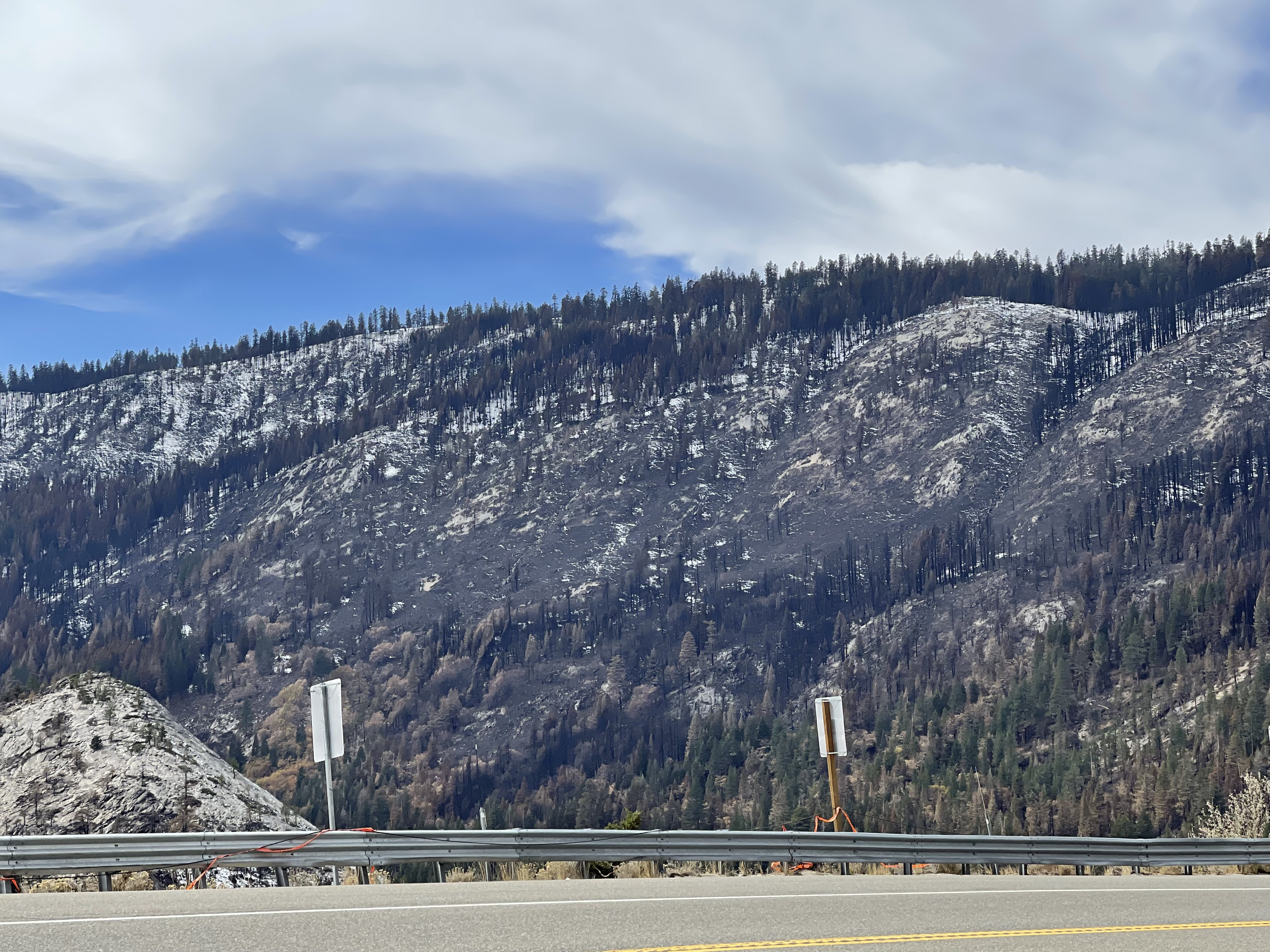

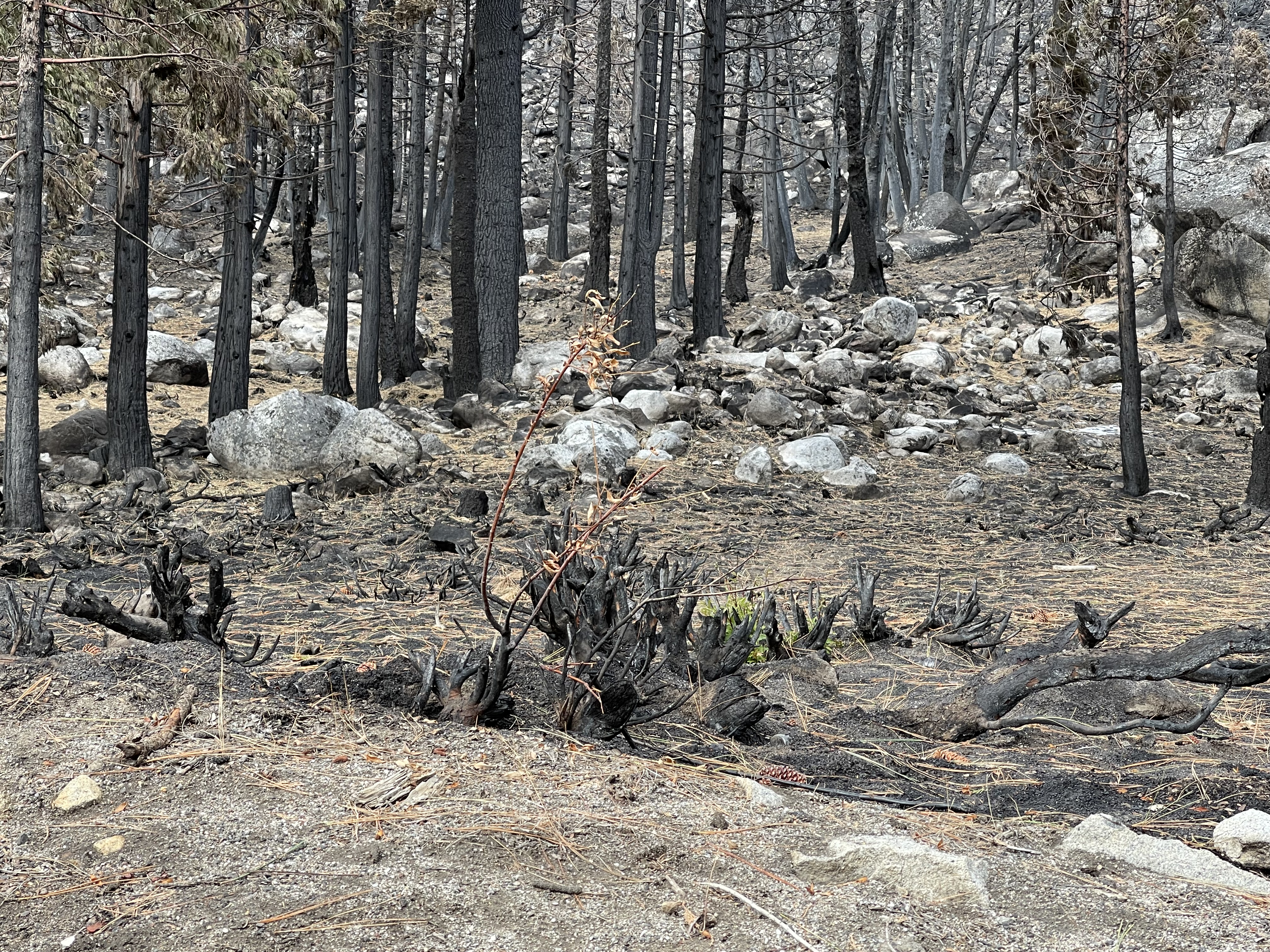

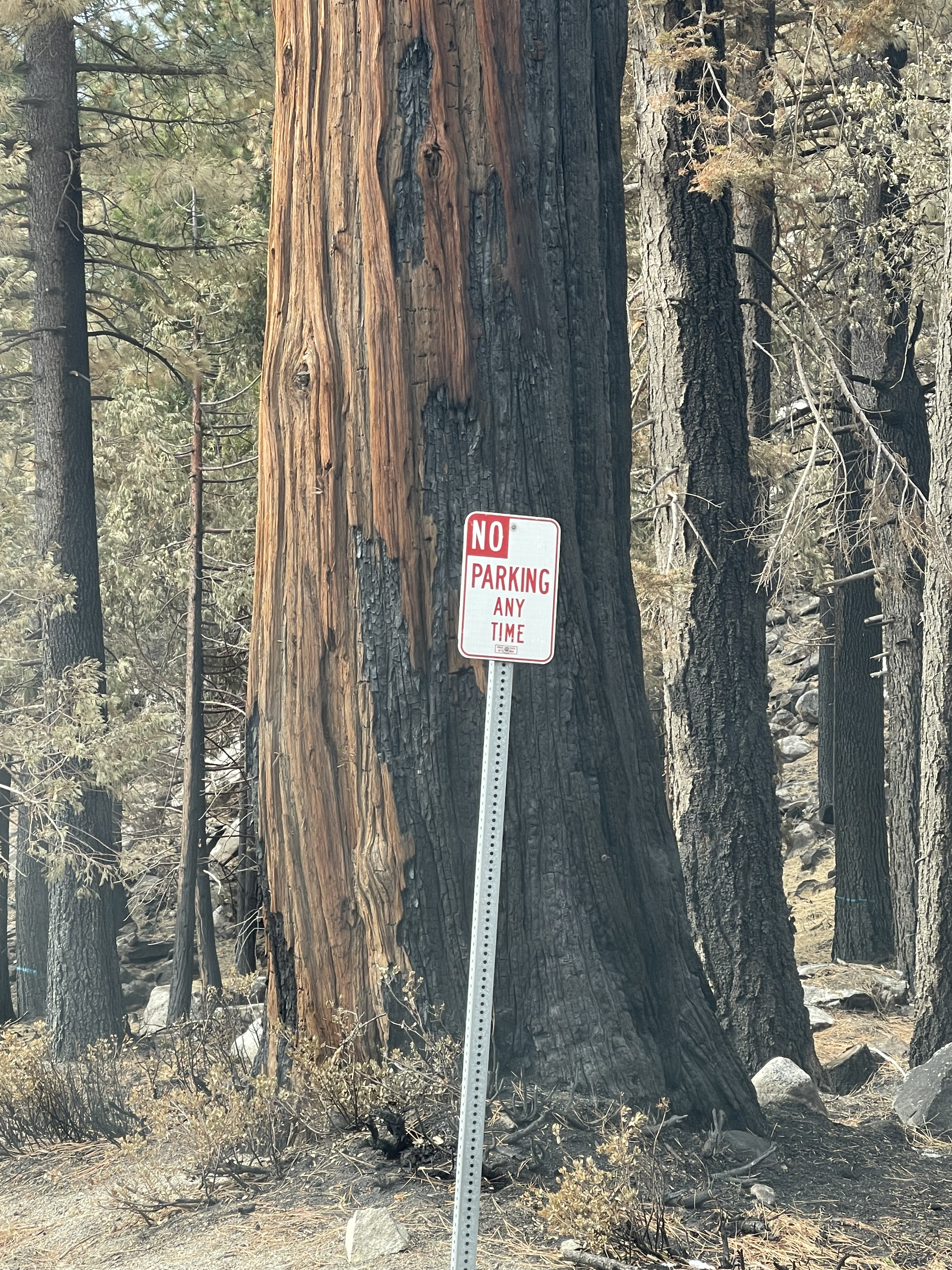

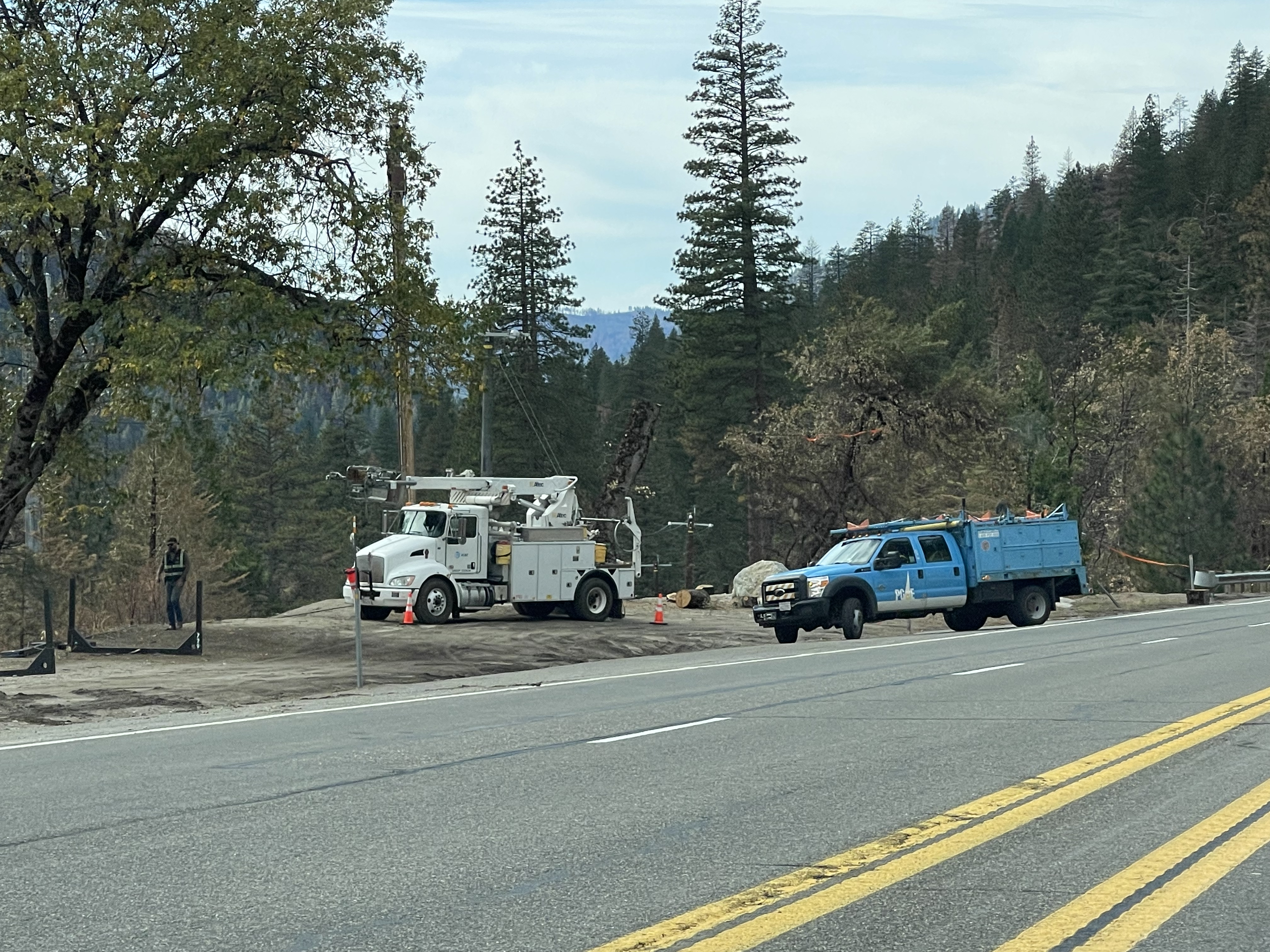
