= Grizzly Flats =

Grizzly Flats may refer to:

- Grizzly Flats Railroad
- Grizzly Flats, California
