= Baltic Peak =

Mountain in California, United States

- Location within California

Highest point
- Elevation: 5,078 ft (1,548 m)
- Prominence: 358 ft (109 m)
- Parent peak: Old Iron Mountain
- Coordinates: 38°41′39″N 120°30′55″W

Geography
- Location: California, United States
- Parent range: Sierra Nevada
- Topo map: USGS Sly Park

Climbing
- First ascent: Unknown
- Easiest route: 4x4 Vehicle

Baltic Peak is a mountain in the Sierra Nevada foothills of El Dorado County in the U.S. state of California. The nearest city to this peak is Grizzly Flats, a small unincorporated community. Branching off of the Mormon Emigrant Trail, which can be found 3.4 miles from Jenkinson Lake, a dirt path can be found leading to an abandoned lookout on the peak. On the north face, there is a gold mine that was built in 1896. The mine closed by 1907. In 1931, Baltic Peak Lookout, an 80-foot-tall steel lookout tower, was built on the mountain at an elevation of 5,046 feet.
