= Dogtown, Mariposa County, California =

Unincorporated community in California, United States

Dogtown
- Unincorporated community
- Location in California Dogtown (the United States)
- Coordinates: 37°42′08″N 120°07′41″W
- Country: United States
- State: California
- County: Mariposa County
- Elevation: 2,582 ft (787 m)

Dogtown is a former settlement in Mariposa County, California, United States. It was located on Maxwell Creek 4 miles (6.4 km) east of Coulterville, at an elevation of 2582 feet (787 m).

Dogtown was a major hydraulic mining center in the late nineteenth century. At its peak, the town boasted numerous hotels, saloons, a dance hall, and a red light district. The town was supposedly named for the many stray dogs that roamed the area during the Gold Rush. A dam failure flooded much of the townsite in 1899; by 1989, only "scattered building foundations and half a dozen wooden structures on the verge of collapse" remained at the site.

Several unrelated communities and mining camps in California also had the name Dogtown during the nineteenth century; including one in Mono County, one in neighboring Merced County, another in Butte County (now Magalia), one in Calaveras County, and a later settlement in Marin County.

== See also ==
- Cat Town, California
- Quartzburg, Mariposa County, California
