= Grizzly Flats, California =

Grizzly Flats
- Census-designated place
- Location of Grizzly Flats in El Dorado County, California.

- Location in California
- Coordinates: 38°38′11″N 120°31′39″W
- Country: United States
- State: California
- County: El Dorado

Area
  - Total: 6.629 sq mi (17.169 km^{2})
  - Land: 6.629 sq mi (17.169 km^{2})
  - Water: 0 sq mi (0 km^{2}) 0%
- Elevation: 3,868 ft (1,179 m)

Population (2020)
  - Total: 1,093
  - Density: 164.9/sq mi (63.66/km^{2})
  - Summer (DST): UTC-7 (PDT)
- ZIP code: 95636
- Area code: 530
- GNIS feature IDs: 2628736

Grizzly Flats (formerly Grizzly Flat and Chickenmasee) is a census-designated place in El Dorado County, California, United States. It is located southeast of Camino, at an elevation of 3868 feet (1179 m). Grizzly Flats is the town nearest to Baltic Peak, a small peak to the northwest. The population at the 2020 census was 1,093.

== History ==
Grizzly Flats originated as a gold mining camp in the 1850s. The name was given by prospectors who were surprised by a grizzly bear there in 1850. In 1852 it was described as being on a flat piece of land measuring approximately one mile by three quarters of a mile and having two combination bars, stores, and boarding houses, with more under construction. It was located centrally in a jurisdiction called Mountain Township. A post office opened in 1854, a stagecoach route to Diamond Springs in 1855, and a Wells Fargo office in 1857. Catholic and Methodist churches were also established in the mid-1850s.

Fires in 1866 and 1869 destroyed most of the settlement; the 1869 fire killed one person and destroyed all but two buildings in the business district, which was only partly rebuilt.

On August 17, 2021, the Caldor Fire destroyed around 500 buildings in and near Grizzly Flats, including the original 1850s post office, the modern post office, and Walt Tyler Elementary School. Two people from the area with serious injuries caused by the fire were airlifted to hospitals. The mandatory evacuation order was lifted on September 6.

== Demographics ==
Historical population
Census	Pop.	Note	%±
2010	1,066		—
2020	1,093		2.5%
U.S. Decennial Census; 2010

Grizzley Flats first appeared as a census designated place in the 2010 U.S. census.

=== 2020 census ===
As of the 2020 census, Grizzly Flats had a population of 1,093. The population density was 164.9 inhabitants per square mile (63.7/km^{2}).

The age distribution was 200 people (18.3%) under the age of 18, 51 people (4.7%) aged 18 to 24, 240 people (22.0%) aged 25 to 44, 328 people (30.0%) aged 45 to 64, and 274 people (25.1%) who were 65 years of age or older. The median age was 51.1 years. For every 100 females, there were 112.2 males, and for every 100 females age 18 and over there were 103.9 males age 18 and over.

0.0% of residents lived in urban areas, while 100.0% lived in rural areas. The whole population lived in households.

There were 465 households, out of which 94 (20.2%) had children under the age of 18 living in them, 269 (57.8%) were married-couple households, 39 (8.4%) were cohabiting couple households, 48 (10.3%) had a female householder with no spouse or partner present, and 109 (23.4%) had a male householder with no spouse or partner present. 104 households (22.4%) were one person, and 59 (12.7%) were one person aged 65 or older. The average household size was 2.35. There were 316 families (68.0% of all households).

There were 654 housing units at an average density of 98.7 units per square mile (38.1 units/km^{2}), of which 465 (71.1%) were occupied. Of these, 402 (86.5%) were owner-occupied, and 63 (13.5%) were occupied by renters. 28.9% of housing units were vacant. The homeowner vacancy rate was 6.9% and the rental vacancy rate was 13.3%.

Racial composition as of the 2020 census
Race	Number	Percent
White	897	82.1%
Black or African American	7	0.6%
American Indian and Alaska Native	19	1.7%
Asian	14	1.3%
Native Hawaiian and Other Pacific Islander	0	0.0%
Some other race	29	2.7%
Two or more races	127	11.6%
Hispanic or Latino (of any race)	99	9.1%

== Climate ==
The Köppen Climate Classification subtype for this climate is "Csb" (Mediterranean Climate).

Climate data for Grizzly Flats
Month	Jan	Feb	Mar	Apr	May	Jun	Jul	Aug	Sep	Oct	Nov	Dec	Year
Mean daily maximum °F (°C)	51.1 (10.6)	52.5 (11.4)	57.2 (14.0)	62.6 (17.0)	71.3 (21.8)	81.0 (27.2)	89.6 (32.0)	90.0 (32.2)	83.7 (28.7)	71.7 (22.1)	57.1 (13.9)	50.2 (10.1)	68.2 (20.1)
Daily mean °F (°C)	42.2 (5.7)	43.1 (6.2)	46.3 (7.9)	49.9 (9.9)	57.4 (14.1)	65.8 (18.8)	72.9 (22.7)	72.6 (22.6)	67.6 (19.8)	58.4 (14.7)	46.9 (8.3)	41.3 (5.2)	55.4 (13.0)
Mean daily minimum °F (°C)	33.4 (0.8)	33.7 (0.9)	35.3 (1.8)	37.2 (2.9)	43.4 (6.3)	50.5 (10.3)	56.2 (13.4)	55.3 (12.9)	51.5 (10.8)	45.1 (7.3)	36.7 (2.6)	32.4 (0.2)	42.6 (5.9)
Average precipitation inches (mm)	9.01 (229)	8.02 (204)	7.36 (187)	4.36 (111)	3.12 (79)	0.79 (20)	0.07 (1.8)	0.08 (2.0)	0.71 (18)	2.83 (72)	5.92 (150)	8.17 (208)	50.42 (1,281)
Source: PRISM Climate Group

== Education ==
The CDP is served by the Pioneer Union Elementary School District and the El Dorado Union High School District.
