= Diamond and Caldor Railway =

Railway in California

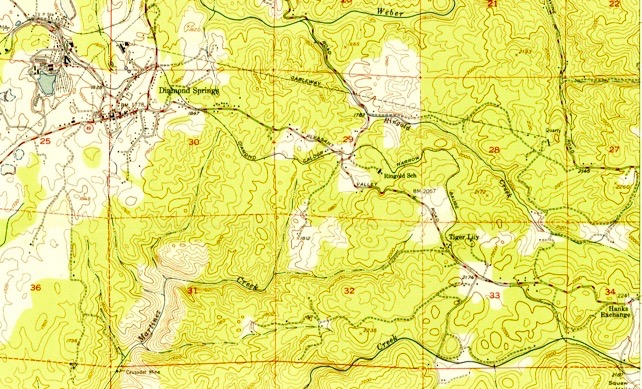
Western section of route into Diamond Springs

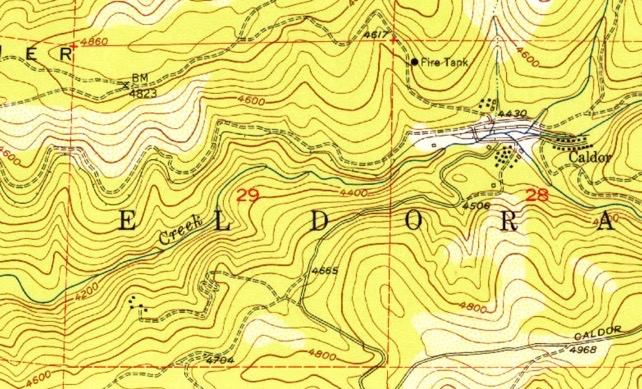
Eastern section of route to Caldor

The Diamond and Caldor Railway was a common carrier 3 ft (914 mm) narrow gauge railroad operating in El Dorado County, California, in the United States. The 34-mile railroad was primarily a logging railroad but also operated some passenger service.

== History ==
The railroad was built by the California Door Company which was founded in 1884 in Oakland, California. The company bought 30,000 acres of wooded land in El Dorado county in 1899 as a source of timber for their plant. They initially used oxen to haul felled trees to their sawmill on the Cosumnes River. In 1901 they experimented with steam tractors for log haulage, but this was unsuccessful. In 1902, a steam-powered sawmill was constructed at Caldor, California and a planning mill 36 miles away at Diamond Springs on the Central Pacific Railroad.

In late 1903, the company began construction of a narrow-gauge railroad to connect the two mills. The railroad was formally incorporated on 9 February 1904, and opened in 1905. It ran along the North Fork of the Cosumnes River. Operations continued until abandonment on April 10, 1953. The railroad primarily operated with Shay locomotives. The remaining Shays, with the exception of #4, were scrapped in 1953. Engine #4 was displayed at the El Dorado County Fairgrounds for several years and is now in the process of being restored by the El Dorado Western Railway Foundation.

Until a fire destroyed the mill at Caldor in 1923, the line hauled rough-cut lumber from Caldor to the sash and door factory in Diamond Springs. After the company built a modern electric mill at Diamond Springs, the railroad hauled uncut logs from the woods to the new mill.

Because the Diamond and Caldor was a common carrier, it had to comply with Interstate Commerce Commission regulations. The railroad failed to comply with the ICC requirement to have railroad cars equipped with air brakes and automatic couplers. The Diamond and Caldor, according to railroad historian Donald B. Robertson, may be the only western railroad to be put out of business due to those equipment requirements.

== Locomotives ==
| Number | Type | Builder | Works number | Date | Notes |
|---|---|---|---|---|---|
| 1 | 0-4-0T | Baldwin | 8955 | 1887 | built as 2-4-2T locomotive as the Ferries & Cliff House Railway #3; scrapped in 1921 |
| 2 | 2-truck Shay locomotive | Lima | 863 | 4/1904 | scrapped in 1940 |
| 2nd # 2 | 2-truck Shay locomotive | Lima | 2842 | 3/1916 | built as Patterson & Western RR # 2; purchased in 1922 |
| 3 | 2-truck Shay locomotive | Lima | 905 | 8/1904 | scrapped in 1938 |
| 4 | 2-truck Shay locomotive | Lima | 1896 | 4/1907 | preserved |
| 5 | 3-truck Shay locomotive | Lima | 2617 | 12/1912 | built as Madera Sugar Pine # 5; purchased for parts in 1935; scrapped in 1948 (for railroad roster purposes, #5 was assigned to a speeder) |
| 6 | 3-truck Shay locomotive | Lima | 2153 | 4/1909 | scrapped in 1953 |
| 7 | 3-truck Shay locomotive | Lima | 2522 | 3/1912 | scrapped in 1953 |
| 8 | 3-truck Shay locomotive | Lima | 2921 | 7/1917 | scrapped in 1953 |
| 9 | | | | | #9 was assigned to a speeder |
| 10 | 3-truck Shay locomotive | Lima | 3252 | 2/1924 | scrapped in 1953 |
| 10 | Bogie railcar | Diamond and Caldor Workshops | | | Built around 1921 and powered by a JX series Studebaker truck engine. |
