= Dog Town, California =

Dog Town
- Ghost town
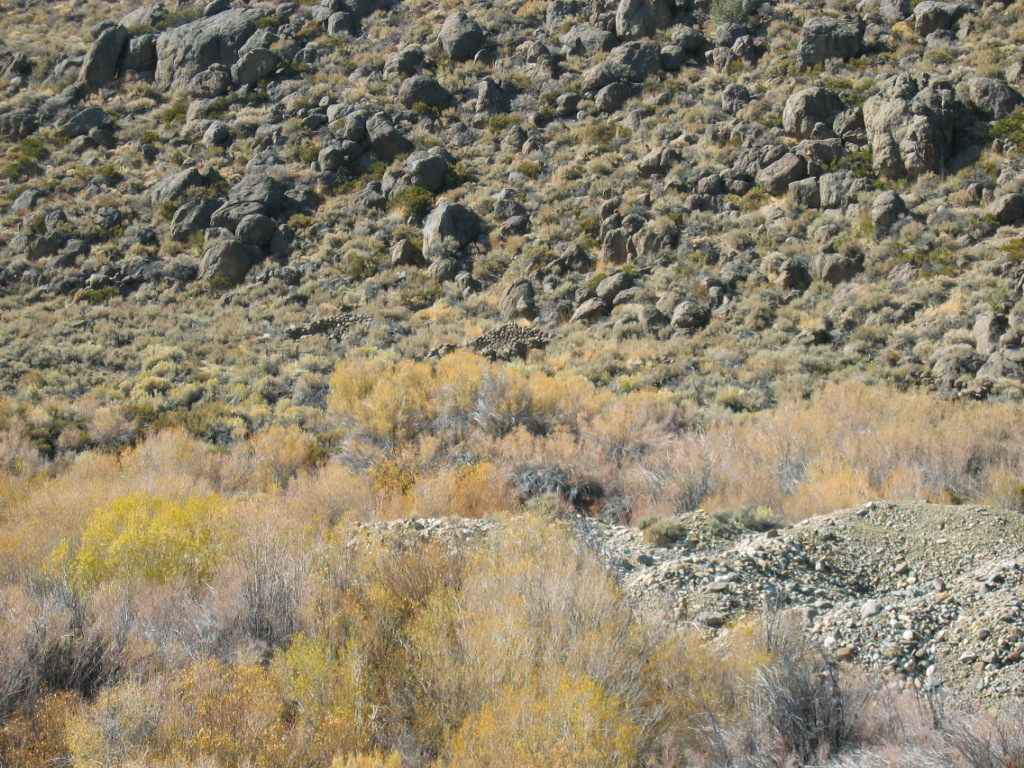
- Site of Dog Town

- Location in California
- Coordinates: 38°10′13″N 119°11′51″W
- Country: United States
- State: California
- County: Mono
- Elevation: 7,057 ft (2,151 m)

California Historical Landmark
- Reference no.: 792

Dog Town (also, Dogtown and Dogtown Diggings) is a gold rush era ghost town in Mono County, California, United States. It is located at 38°10′13″N 119°11′51″W, on Dog Creek, near the junction of Clearwater and Virginia Creeks, approximately 6 miles (10 km) south-southeast of Bridgeport, at an elevation of 7057 feet (2151 m).

== History ==
The town was established in approximately 1857 by Carl Norst as a placer mining camp. By 1859, a group of Mormons had arrived as miners at the site and a mining camp arose. Dog Town became the site of the first gold rush to the eastern slope of the Sierra Nevada. Prospectors rushed here after hearing rumors of gold being washed out near Mono Lake. A small camp and trading center sprung up immediately. Dogtown did attract attention to the area as a whole, including the subsequent discoveries of much richer gold deposits in nearby areas such as Bodie, Aurora and Masonic.

== Town name ==
The name "Dogtown" was often applied by miners to camps where living conditions were miserable. It was derived from a popular miner's term for camps made of huts. A cemetery and ruins of the makeshift dwellings that once formed part of the “diggings” here are all that remain of this rugged, yet historically significant town; making the name "Dogtown Diggings."

It was also said that the town got its name from the number of dogs there actually were in the town. According to passed down history, a woman had come to the town with her three dogs which began breeding. Then as she found that the male miners felt alone without their families, she sold them the puppies for pinches of gold. This then led to even more puppies being born and populating the town, hence the name Dog Town.

== Mining success ==
Dog Town produced the largest gold nugget ever found on the Sierra's eastern slope. However, its overall gold production was not extensive. Within a couple years of its establishment, the town was abandoned as miners left in search of more profitable strikes. Nearby, the more appealing and profitable town of Monoville was booming, eventually expanding to a population of 700 pioneers.

In its prime from 1849 to the turn of the century, Dog Town was also one of the biggest hydraulic mining camps in California. Hundreds of men operating giant hoses equipped with rotating nozzles washed down vast mountain slopes in search of gold.

== Today ==
As of 2005, the surviving remnants of Dogtown are the walls of several stone huts, a few roof timbers, and a single gravesite. The ruins have been mildly vandalized. All that remains of old Dogtown are scattered building foundations and a few wooden structures on the verge of collapse. Surrounding ranches and three homes of relatively recent vintage along French Gulch Creek occupy what once was a riotous mining camp.

People today still continue to search for gold in Dog Town. While the older miners gave up on striking riches there, prospectors insist that not all the gold was taken and some still remains in those hills and old diggings.

The site is registered as California Historical Landmark. A landmark plaque by the side of nearby U.S. Highway 395 marks the location.

Dog Town's ruins and its commemorative plaque is located on Highway 395 at post mile 69.5 (7 miles south of Bridgeport.)

== Gallery ==
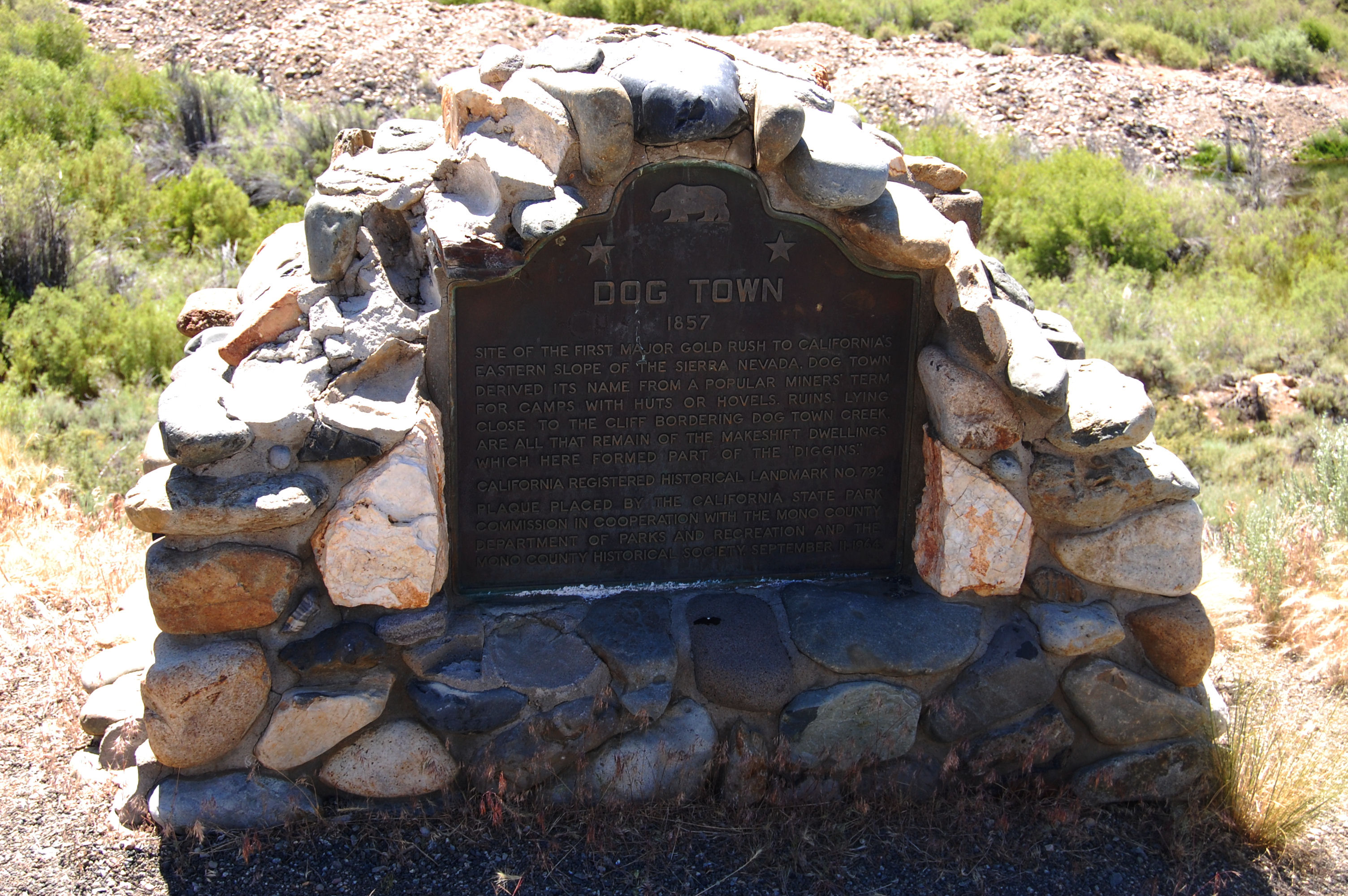
The California Historical Marker plaque for Dog Town

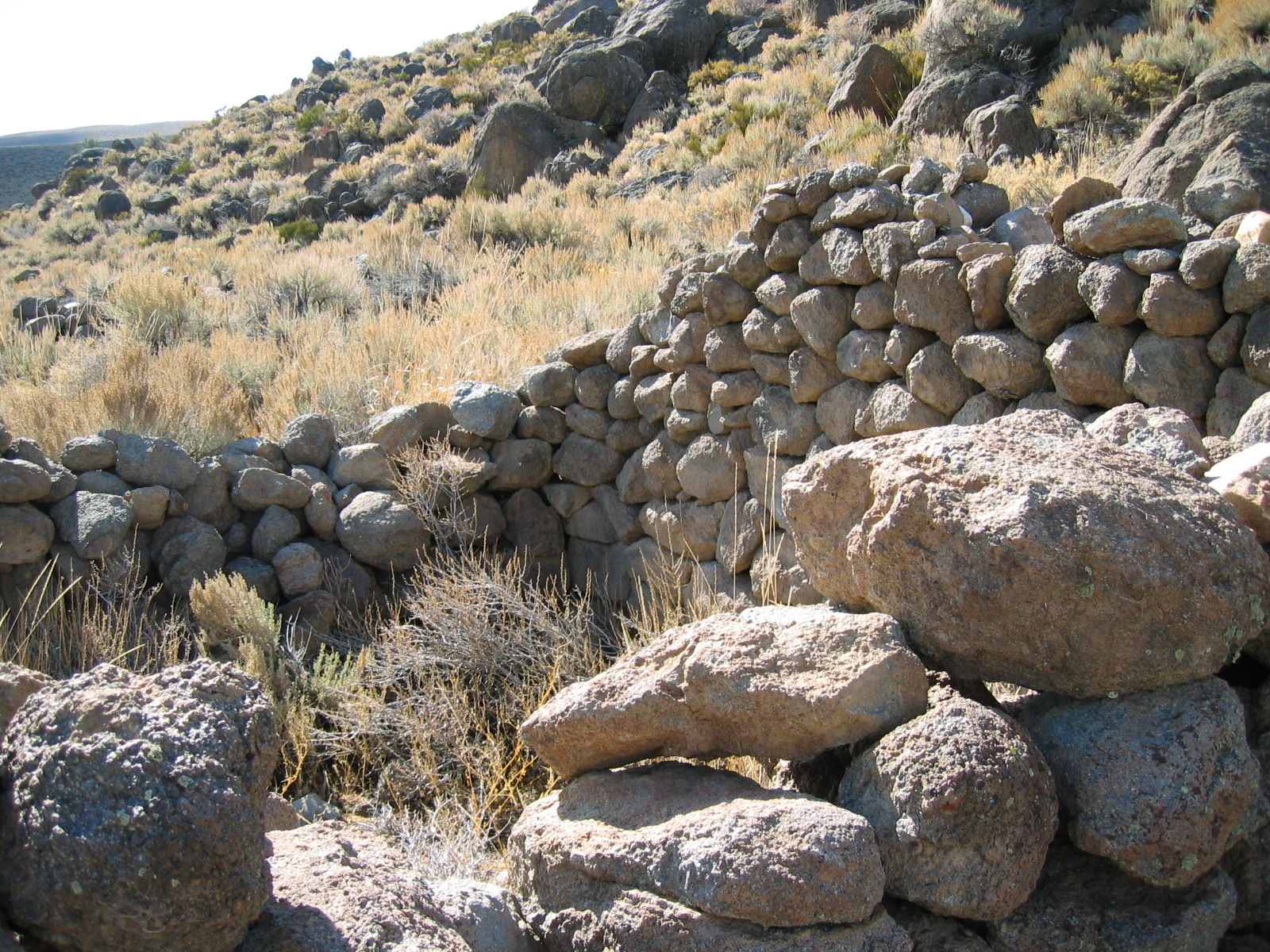
Ruins of a stone hut
