= Caldor, California =

Unincorporated community in California

Coordinates: 38°36′22″N 120°25′58″W

Caldor (previously Dogtown) was a company town in El Dorado County, California, United States. Caldor was linked to Diamond Springs by the Diamond and Caldor Railway. The community was named for the California Door Company, which owned and operated the town.

== Geography ==
Caldor was located in southern El Dorado County, 5 miles (8 km) miles southeast of the nearest extant community, Grizzly Flats. The town was situated at the confluence of Dogtown Creek and its tributary McKinney Creek, nestled in a narrow valley between Plummer Ridge to the north and a spur of Big Mountain Ridge to the south. The townsite sits at an elevation of about 4,400 feet (1,300 m).

== History ==
During the California Gold Rush, a settlement called Dogtown was established, and a sawmill was built. It was located 0.5 miles (0.80 km) northeast of Newtown. A reference to the town can be found in the Mountain Democrat newspaper, in which Jake Schneider of Pleasant Valley moved to Dogtown in order to open a butcher shop.

In 1900, long after the town had been abandoned, the California Door Company bought a 30,000 acres (50 sq mi) tract of forested land in the El Dorado County Hills. This tract included the former Dogtown townsite, and the company built a town on site to house the workers needed to operate the mill, which they soon replaced with a much larger one. Worried about the connotations of the name "Dogtown" and the effect such a name would have on the reputation of the company, the company directors renamed the town Caldor – California Door Company.

In 1904, the company built a railroad from Caldor to the town of Diamond Springs. From then on, hundreds of men were employed in Caldor, producing 20 million board-feet of lumber a year. In 1906, the town housed 120 men and their families.

In 1923, the sawmill burnt down. It was not replaced. After the fire, the company transported the logs to a mill in Diamond Springs, about 30 miles (50 km) away at the other end of the railroad.

Decades later, in 1953, the railroad was no longer being heavily used, the logs instead being transported by truck, and so it was removed. Around this same time, the California Door Company had almost used up its timber resources in the land it owned around Caldor, so the community's life began drawing to a close. In 1955, to supplement the dwindling supply of wood from Caldor, the company began importing mahogany logs from the Philippine island of Mindanao, 8,000 miles (13,000 km) away across the Pacific Ocean to be processed at Diamond Springs.
