= Cleveland Fire =

1992 wildfire in Northern California

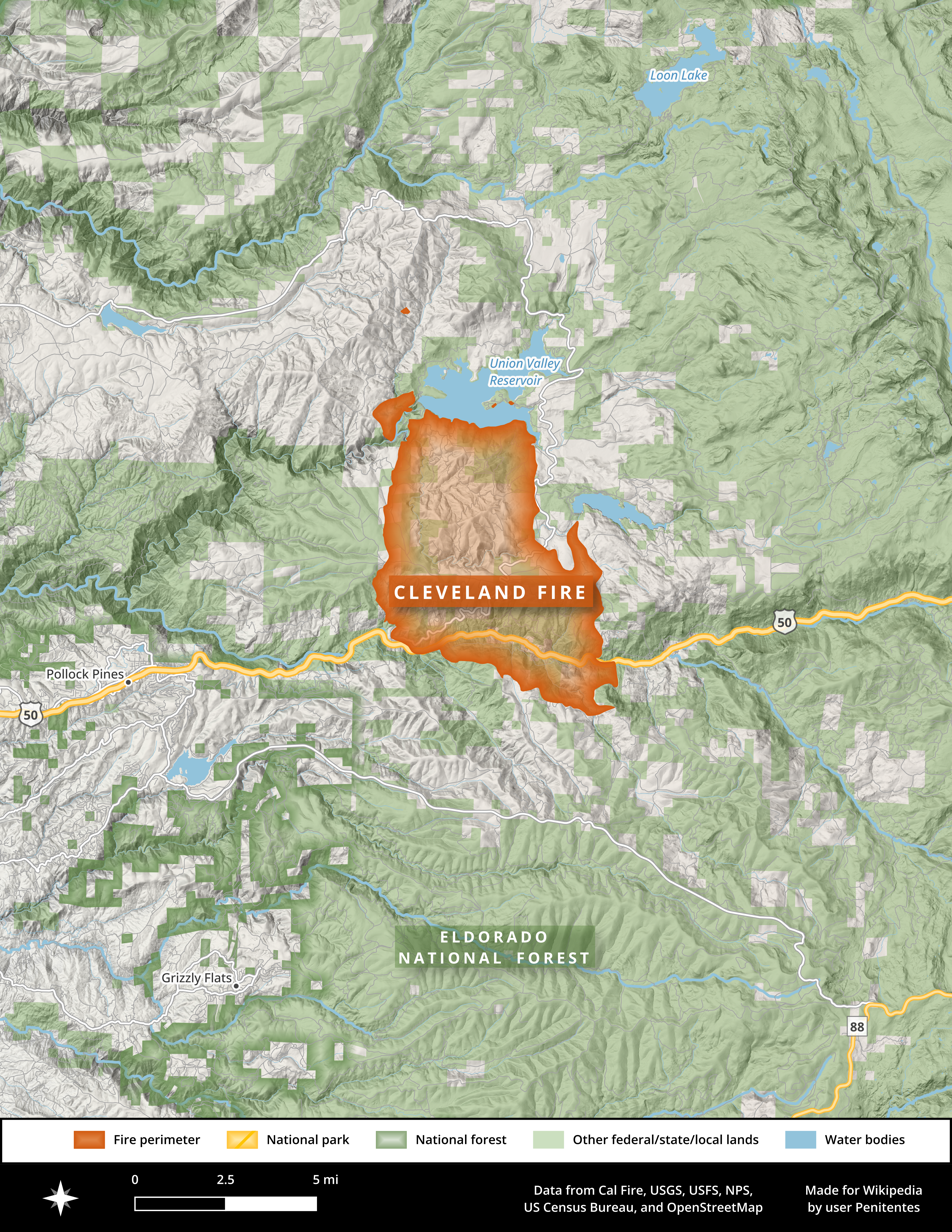
- A map of the area burned in the Cleveland Fire, within the Eldorado National Forest
- Date: September 29 –; October 4, 1992; (5 days)
- Location: El Dorado County, Northern California, United States
- Coordinates: 38.769°N 120.447°W

Statistics
- Burned area: 24,580 acres (9,947 ha; 38 sq mi; 99 km^{2})

Impacts
- Deaths: 2
- Injuries: 72
- Structures destroyed: 41
- Cost: $245 million; (equivalent to about $490 million in 2024)

Map
- The location of the Cleveland Fire in Northern California

The Cleveland Fire was a large wildfire in Northern California's El Dorado County in the fall of 1992. The fire began on September 29 and burned for five days, spreading to 24,580 acres (9,950 hectares) before it was fully contained on October 4. Two air tanker pilots died in a crash while fighting the fire and dozens of personnel were injured. Forty-one buildings were destroyed. The cost of fighting the fire reached $16 million (equivalent to about $32 million in 2024), and losses from burned timber and other property amounted to $245 million (equivalent to about $490 million in 2024).

== Background ==
The Cleveland Fire burned on the western slope of the Sierra Nevada following six years of drought. The drought had killed 10 million trees across the state and weakened countless others, helping enable insect infestation. Early in the year, there were warnings of extreme fire danger. In part because of the dry conditions, 1992 saw more wildfires—12,717 through October 25—across California than in any year since 1988, and the chief deputy director of the California Department of Forestry called it "the most incredible burning situation many of us have ever seen".

The Cleveland Fire was the third significant wildfire in Northern California in six weeks, alongside the 64,000-acre (26,000 ha) Fountain Fire in Shasta County and the 17,300-acre (7,000 ha) Old Gulch Fire in Calaveras County. It followed another major fire in the same area in 1959 which burned 18,000 acres (7,300 ha). Tree plantations planted following that fire reburned in the Cleveland Fire.

== Cause ==
While the fire was active, the Los Angeles Times wrote that the fire's cause was undetermined, though "believed to be of human origin". There had been eight or nine small fires in the vicinity of Highway 50 and Ice House Road since the beginning of September, which a Forest Service special agent called an "interesting coincidence" but did not explicitly link to the Cleveland Fire. Multiple witnesses told The Sacramento Bee that they saw a white vehicle near the fire's point of ignition. By February 1993 Forest Service investigators had not determined a cause. The Tahoe Daily Tribune wrote in 2012 that it was caused by illegal wood cutting.

== Progression ==
The Cleveland Fire began on Tuesday, September 29, 1992 near the community of Riverton on the north side of U.S. Route 50, in the South Fork American River canyon 35 miles (56 km) west of South Lake Tahoe. The fire was reported by a fire lookout a few minutes before 1:00 p.m. PDT and named for the nearby Cleveland Corral picnic area. Moments after the lookout's report, the superintendent and a foreman of the Eldorado National Forest hotshot crew arrived on scene. The fire was one-quarter acre (0.10 ha) in size, and temporarily contained between Highway 50 and an uphill switchback of nearby Ice House Road. Not possessing a fire engine, the superintendent requested more resources, but a spot fire jumped across Ice House Road and "within a matter of seconds" was too large to be contained by the two firefighters.

Three to four minutes after the fire was reported, a Sikorsky S-58T helitack crew arrived on scene. They described the fire as now 10–15 acres (4.0–6.1 ha) in size, with flame lengths of 100 feet (30 m). The fire was spreading rapidly, with ember spotting up to one-quarter mile (0.40 km) away. The crew was able to hold the fire's western flank, protecting the community of Pollock Pines, but were unable to halt its advance up the canyon, and it bypassed crews at Peavine Ridge. At 1:30 p.m., with flames spreading to the south side of the South Fork American River canyon, authorities closed Highway 50. By late Tuesday the fire had spread to approximately 7,000 acres (2,800 ha) and was being fought by 500 firefighters.

On Wednesday, September 30, the El Dorado County Board of Supervisors declared a state of emergency. In its second day the Cleveland Fire burned 12,300 acres (5,000 ha) for a total of 18,600 acres (7,500 ha), with five percent of its perimeter contained by 10:00 p.m. by 2,300 personnel engaged on it. Twenty-mile-per-hour (32 km/h) winds continued to stoke the fire as it burned northeast, threatening communications infrastructure and campgrounds in the Crystal Basin Recreation Area. The fire's smoke plume reached an altitude of 25,000 feet (7,600 m), visible in Placer County to the north and from Sacramento 60 miles (97 km) to the west. A Forest Service spokesperson told the Los Angeles Times that the situation was "a firefighter’s worst nightmare—low humidity, high winds, prolonged drought conditions... It will be a miracle if we can hold the fire back with these kinds of winds". The fire's growth worked out to more than 20,000 acres (8,100 ha) in 30 hours.

On Thursday, October 1, though the fire continued moving northeast towards Union Valley Reservoir, humidity levels rose and temperatures dropped. Rain fell on every part of the fire; the fire lookout on Big Hill in the center of the burned area recorded 0.2 inches (0.51 cm). This aided the more than 3,000 firefighters who had by this point achieved 20 percent containment of the fire. The Tahoe Daily Tribune wrote that, if not for the light precipitation, "forest officials believe the blaze could have spread to the edge of Desolation Wilderness, burning 50,000 acres (20,000 ha)". The fire had closed to within several miles of the wilderness area's boundary.

Twenty-seven aircraft were also engaged on the fire, including 20–25 helicopters operating out of Placerville Airport. At 12:30 p.m. Thursday, one of the aircraft—Air Tanker 61—crashed near Union Valley Reservoir, killing both pilots. The aircraft was a four-engine DC-7, operated by TB&M Inc. and used for dropping fire retardant. The crash flung debris 600 feet (180 m) away and started its own small fire, which was contained by nightfall. One of the pilots had reported engine trouble shortly before the crash. The widow of one of the pilots sued the aircraft's owners for wrongful death.

The rain and the completion of three miles (4.8 km) of fire line meant that by 6:00 a.m. on Friday, October 2, the Cleveland Fire was 50 percent contained. It had burned 24,500 acres (9,900 ha) acres and was being fought by 5,200 firefighters, split between one camp at Union Valley Reservoir and one at the El Dorado County Fairgrounds in Placerville. By that evening the fire was 85 percent contained. On Saturday, October 3, the fire was 90 percent contained.

Officials declared the fire fully contained on the morning of Sunday, October 4, and fully controlled on October 14, 1992. (Note: 'Containment' and 'control' of a wildfire are technical terms used by fire officials. A wildfire is contained when it is completely encircled by control lines (including fire breaks, burned-out areas, and natural features). A wildfire is controlled when it is contained and has been extinguished such that it no longer threatens to spread any further.) The fire suppression effort cost $16 million. The fire burned a total area of 24,580 acres (9,950 ha), including 12,100 acres (4,900 ha) of private land largely owned by the Michigan-California Lumber Company. The burned area spanned roughly four miles (6.4 km), between Highway 50 and Union Valley Reservoir. A Forest Service burned area rehabilitation specialist said that because of the six years of drought, more than 80 percent of the fire area burned at a high intensity, killing all mature trees.

== Effects ==
The Sacramento Bee called the Cleveland Fire "El Dorado County's worst fire disaster in history". The San Francisco Examiner called it California's "second worst wildland fire of the year" after the Fountain Fire. In addition to the two air tanker pilot fatalities, the Cleveland Fire caused 72 injuries.

=== Closures and evacuations ===
A 46-mile (74 km) portion of Highway 50—the main link between Lake Tahoe and San Francisco—was closed between Pollock Pines and Meyers during the fire and the communities of Whitehall, Riverton, Kyburz and Strawberry along the highway were evacuated, totaling about 150–200 residents. The Union Valley Reservoir area was evacuated on September 29. During the highway closure, business at some casinos in South Lake Tahoe declined by 25–40 percent. The highway reopened at 7:00 p.m. on Tuesday, October 6. Smoke from the fire caused the Placer County Air Pollution Control District to issue a health advisory advising residents to limit their outdoor activity. The fire also caused the temporary shutdown of five hydroelectric facilities in its vicinity, one belonging to PG&E and four belonging to the Sacramento Municipal Utilities District in the Ice House Reservoir area.

=== Damage ===
The fire destroyed 41 structures. This toll included at least six homes and 20 summer cabins, as well as the Forest Service fire lookout on Big Hill. A 4,000-foot (1,200 m) section of an aqueduct operated by Pacific Gas and Electric Company (PG&E) was destroyed. The aqueduct provided 37 percent of the water supply for the El Dorado Irrigation District, which was largely responsible for providing domestic water supplies in western El Dorado County. The resulting shortage led to voluntary water restrictions in the area. The aqueduct was repaired by December 1993 after a four-month repair effort involving more than 8,000 equipment lifts by helicopter. The replacement cost $17 million (equivalent to about $33 million in 2024).

More than 11,000 acres (4,500 ha) of the Eldorado National Forest burned, damaging 200 million board feet of timber. California Department of Forestry and Forest Service officials estimated property and timber losses from the fire at $245 million, including $240 million in timber losses. According to the National Fire Protection Association, firefighting costs and property losses worked out to $10,700 per acre burned.

=== Replanting and salvage logging ===
The Eldorado National Forest conducted an aerial reseeding operation over 9,580 acres (3,880 ha) of Forest Service and lumber company land, hoping to use cereal barley to help stabilize the soil to prevent erosion and landslides. In conjunction with the aerial operation, workers built more than 1,100 check dams to catch debris and eroded soil in drainages of the American River. The operation was completed before the end of October 1992. The fire's removal of vegetation and the resulting absence of evapotranspiration was later suggested by an Eldorado National Forest geologist as a contributing factor to an enormous landslide in 1997 that closed Highway 50 for weeks. One environmental group attributed it to the salvage logging effort.

The Forest Service's recovery plan allowed for the salvage logging of 155 million board feet of timber in the fire area. The plan allowed for the retention of 11 percent of the dead wood by volume, the creation of almost six miles (9.7 km) of temporary roads, and the dismantling of 40 miles (64 km) of existing roads. The final timber harvest target exceeded the Eldorado National Forest's entire annual timber sale volume of roughly 140 million board feet. The salvage logging plan was anticipated to create 2,140 jobs. During the three years following the fire, the forest carried out a $15 million reforestation project that saw four million seedlings planted. The fire led to a debate over the contribution of conifer plantations to wildfire spread and severity, as well as the need for more prescribed burning.

== See also ==
- Glossary of wildfire terms
- List of California wildfires
- 1992 Fountain Fire
- 2014 King Fire
- 2021 Caldor Fire
