= Sierra Pacific Industries =

American lumber production company

- Type: Private
- Industry: Lumber
- Founded: 1949; 77 years ago
- Founder: R. H. Emmerson; A. A. Emmerson
- Headquarters: Anderson, California, United States
- Number of locations: 6 sawmills in California; 4 sawmills in Washington; 2 sawmills in Oregon
- Key people: George Emmerson (President); Mark Emmerson (CEO)
- Website: spi-ind.com

Sierra Pacific Industries (SPI) is the second-largest lumber producer in the United States. A privately held company, it was co-founded in 1949 by R. H. Emmerson and his son, A. A. "Red" Emmerson, the long-term CEO, and A. A. Emmerson's sons George and Mark are now president and CEO. Headquartered in Anderson, California, it is the largest private landholder in California. It has drawn criticism for some of its environmental practices.

== Background ==
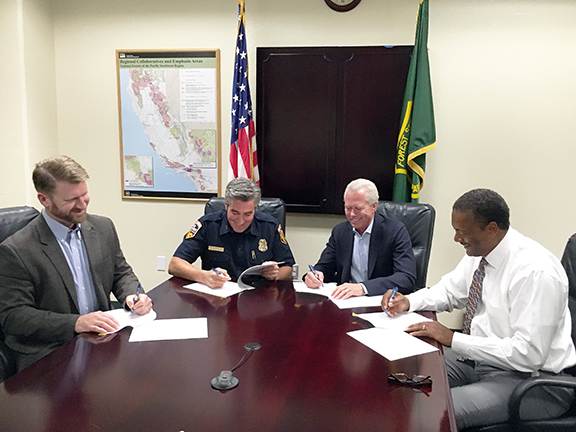
On 16 August 2017 a Memorandum of Understanding was signed between parties interested in reducing wildfires on federal, state and Sierra Pacific Industries land in California. Members of the National Fish and Wildlife Foundation, California Department of Forestry and Fire Protection and U.S. Forest Service joined Mark Emmerson of SPI (second right) in making the declaration.

Logging in the Sierra Nevada arose from the desire for economic growth throughout California. The California Gold Rush created a high demand for timber in housing construction, mining procedures, and building railroads. In the early days, forest harvesting was unregulated, and within the first 20 years after the gold rush, a third of the timber in the Sierra Nevada was logged. The overall economic impact of the forest industry in California in the 21st century is fairly modest. California forests produce about 350 million board feet of wood products annually. These products include $100 million in market value for saw timber and $40 million in market value for electricity produced from biomass. As of 2024, logging provides jobs for about 2,000 private sector workers in California. For comparison, thirty-three million people visit National Forests in California for recreation annually, generating 38,000 outdoor recreation-related jobs.

=== R. H. and A. A. Emmerson ===
A. A. "Red" Emmerson has been described as "low-key, hard-working and notoriously shy of publicity". Writing for The Land Report in 2022, Eric O'Keefe reported on Red Emmerson's rags to riches rise. Emmerson told him he was brought up in Newberg, Oregon in a broken home, failed in education, was sent to a strict Seventh-day Adventist boarding school in Eastern Washington, from which he was expelled, although not before getting a paying job driving a truck at 35¢ an hour (equivalent to $6.75 in 2025). His father, R. H. "Curly" Emmerson, endeavored to make a living in timber, which at the time dominated the economy of the Pacific Northwest, building "crude, temporary" sawmills in the backyard, but was so unsuccessful that his wife, Emily, left him and went to Alaska. Red Emmerson found a job as a ranch hand, where he gained his nickname. Curly Emmerson finally achieved some success in 1947, when competitors were embroiled in a regional strike.

== History ==
In the 1920s and 1930s, the Northwest teemed with jerry-rigged sawmills, crude contraptions in logging camps and at railheads that sputtered to life and spewed diesel fumes and sawdust. Such was Curly’s lot. Most of his mills were woefully undercapitalized. The ones that actually made money burned to the ground. Twice.

— Eric O'Keefe in The Land Report

In 1949, Curly Emmerson asked his son to join him. They founded R. H. Emmerson and son, and together built a sawmill in Northern California, which Red ran, with Curly buying the timber. They prospered, and further mills followed the flagship mill in Arcata. O'Keefe notes that, at this point, the Emmersons "didn't own a single acre. Yet they could profit from the millions of acres around them." They bought a 2,500-acre tract in 1958 and a 5,400-acre tract in 1961. The new company benefitted from post-war economic growth, which rejuvenated both the lumber market and housing production. However, with greater demand came greater competition, which by the 1960s was severe.

A partnership with fellow Arcata lumber owner Mike Crook—which saw him invest $10,000 (equivalent to $267634.85 in 2025) and the Emmersons manage his mill as well as their own—as well as a successful lawsuit saw them finally "flush with cash". A series of further investments and large purchases followed until they could borrow massive sums from the Bank of America to fund growth. For example, in 1957, they borrowed $250,000 (equivalent to $2865817.54 in 2025). This was followed by another of $500,000 (equivalent to $5441507311.59 in 2025), until in 1965 the Emmersons borrowed $2.8 million (equivalent to $28606124.6 in 2025). Each loan was paid off early.

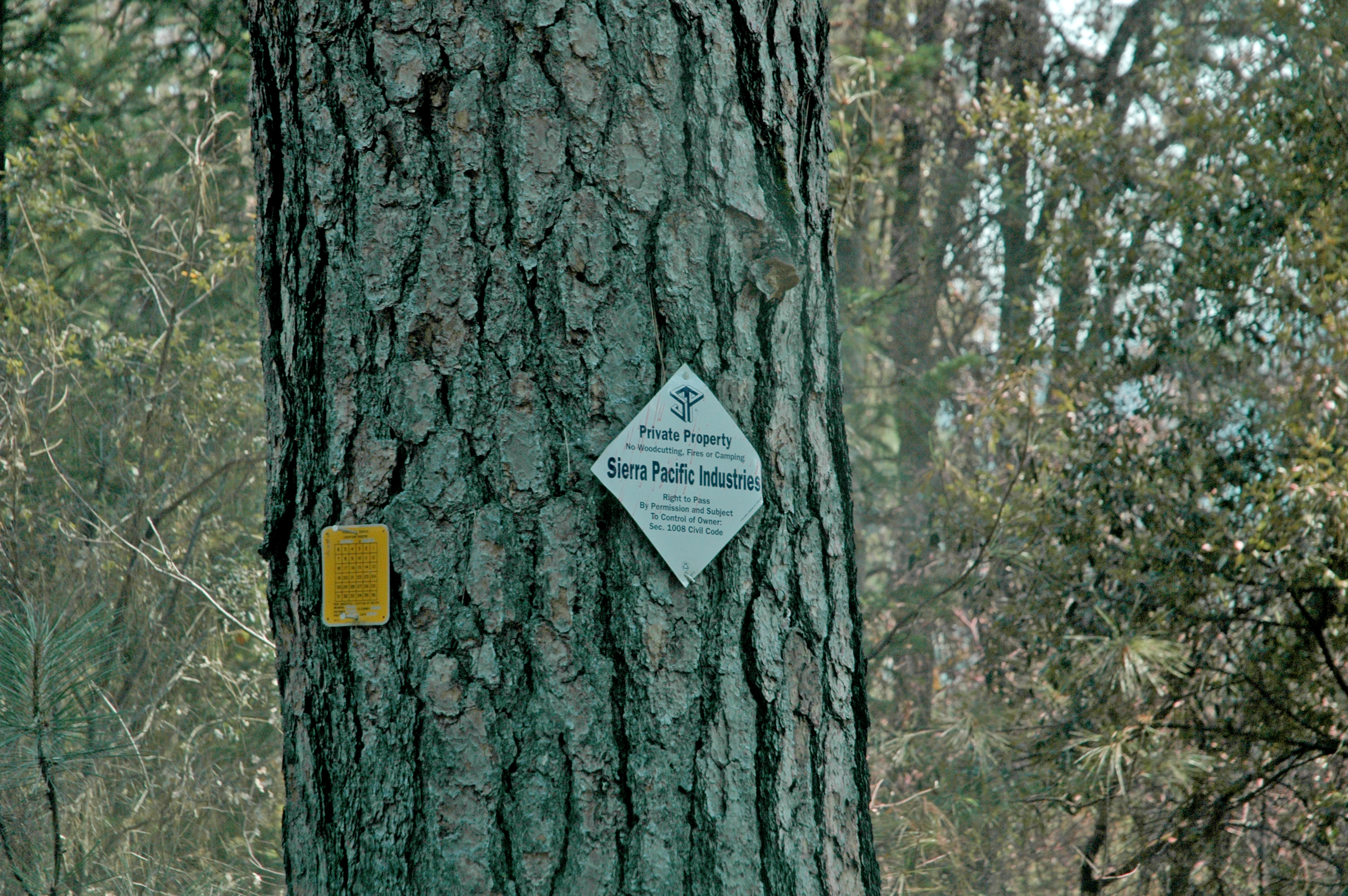
Tree marker indicating property of Sierra Pacific Industries

Crook's son John entered into a partnership with Red in 1969, and the company became a publicly traded company and changed its name to Sierra Pacific Industries. In 1974, Keene was bought out and SPI was privatized, with Red's and Curly's partnership being officially dissolved. The company underwent radical expansion due to the 1980s housing boom as the majority of its lumber was destined for the house-building market. As a result of this demand, it purchased a large quantity of land. Small mills that could not compete went to the wall; SPI "took advantage of the situation and managed to record enviable growth as other companies struggled to survive". Contemporary industry leader and millionaire Harry Merlo summed up the reasons for SPI's growth at this time: "As people got out of sawmilling, what did they do? They sold their assets to Red. He was the last man standing." (Note: For example, in 1995 Sierra Pacific acquired the wood products division of Fibreboard.) The precise figures are unknown but appear to range from approximately 525,000 acres (820 sq mi) to 1,000,000 acres (1,600 sq mi) in Northern California at a cost of between $465 million (equivalent to $1241361.85 million in 2025) and $660 million (equivalent to $1796707934.72 million in 2025). SPI bought the Sonora sawmill in 1995; this had been in operation since 1901. SPI closed the plant in 2009, although it reopened two years later following an upgrade. In 1996, SPI was incorporated.

Red Emmerson and his wife, Ida, had two sons, George and Mark, who succeeded their father as President and Chief Executive, respectively. Vaughn Emmerson, Red's grandson, runs the Anderson fabrication plant.

George Emmerson has said that in the early 21st century SPI had reached its limits in the state: "We had got to the point in California where there wasn't opportunity to expand ... We owned almost 1.5 million acres, (Note: 1,500,000 acres (2,300 sq mi).) and we weren't going to build another sawmill". As a result, in 2021 the company purchased Seneca, a timber company based in Eugene, Oregon, adding 175,000 acres (273 sq mi) of land in Oregon to its holdings. That year SPI became the country's biggest private landowner.The San Francisco Chronicle has argued that the reasoning behind Emmerson's land purchases is his belief that as Federal regulation increases, national forests will become unreliable for timber sourcing. As of 2024 the company owns mills and timberland in California, Oregon, and Washington, but has also diversified into recreational parks and biomass energy.

=== Acquisitions ===
- 1965 - California operations of Weyerhaeuser
- 1978 - 69,000 acres from Publishers Forest Products, a division of Times Mirror Company.
- 1987 - 520,000 acres of northern California timberland from Santa Fe Pacific Corporation.
- 1989 - Truckee, California operations of Fibreboard (49,000 acres)
- 1991 - California operations of Bohemia (33,000 acres)
- 1994 - Michigan-California Lumber Company's mill in Camino, California
- 1995 - wood products division of Fibreboard
- 1996 - Martell, California operations of Georgia-Pacific (127,000 acres)
- 1997 - Feather Falls tract (38,000 acres) from Louisiana-Pacific
- 2003 - Wetsel-Oviatt Lumber (17,500 acres)
- 2004 - California timberland of Roseburg Forest Products (45,000 acres (18,000 ha))
- 2019-2020 - Burney Tract and Lassen Tract from Fruit Growers Supply.
- 2021 - Seneca Jones Timber Company (175,000 acres) and Seneca Sawmills

== Profitability ==
Forbes has estimated SPI's operating profits at around $375 million on annual sales of over $1.5 billion. Real assets comprise 18 sawmills and other holdings across five states. (Note: "SPI says that it now has 18 sawmills across the three states. It also has window plants in Alabama and Wisconsin.") It is headquartered in Anderson, California, where it also runs its own fabrication plant, building many of the parts, spares and repairs for the mills. Another major source of income is salvage logging (Note: Salvage logging is the practice of felling trees damaged by wildfire, flood, severe wind, disease, insect infestation, or other natural disturbance in order to recover economic value that would otherwise be lost.)—at which SPI is the country's biggest operator—with some such purchases being "for pennies on a dollar". As a result of the Forest Resources Conservation and Shortage Relief Act of 1990, there is little overall competition in the lumber industry. (Note: The Act forbade log-export companies from participating in domestic contract bidding. SPI does not export, but other large U.S. companies such as Weyerhaeuser and Rayonier and foreign companies, such as Canadian timber producers, are thus forbidden from competing with it.)

A. A. Emmerson and his children have all donated to the National Alliance of Forest Owners PAC, which has listed them among "individual donors [who] gave 110 large ($200+) contributions" over several election cycles. (Note: Between 2014 and 2024, A. A. Emmerson donated $40,000; George and Mark Emmerson $45,000; and Carolyn Dietz $15,000.)

== Land ownership ==
By 2009, SPI and Turner Enterprises had been overtaking each other to be the largest land owner in the United States. SPI is the largest landowner in California, with an estimated holding of 1,700,000 acres (2,700 sq mi), amounting to twice the area of Yosemite National Park. An article in SFGate characterized it as "a major player in any consideration of the state's environmental future".

== Criticism ==
The company's activities have attracted criticism from environmentalists. By the late 1980s, public opinion had begun to turn against corporate irresponsibility in the environment, and several amendments had been passed to tighten the 1964 Wilderness Act.

=== Clear cutting and harm to wildlife ===
Two different visions are evolving for the Sierra Nevada. The first is one promulgated by the U.S. Forest Service [and] environmentalists ... [and] implies an intact and essentially inviolate forest. Moderate selective cutting is allowed, but greater emphasis is placed on wildlife and recreation values. The second is basically Sierra Pacific's long-range harvest plan: clear-cutting in a methodical fashion and replanting the logged units. Meticulously managing the forest as a tree plantation, in other words. Only one vision can prevail.

— San Francisco Chronicle, June 26, 2000

Environmental activists have been particularly concerned about the practice of clear cutting. The San Francisco Chronicle described the results of clear cutting in the Sierra Nevada as leaving "a blank spot in the forest, a treeless zone, littered with charred stumps". SPI has argued in response that it is "in the business of growing forests, not destroying them", and that while the company does clear cut in bulk, it replants quickly, and also replants brushlands with new saplings, effectively creating a new forest, and that therefore "[W]e're growing more timber than we're harvesting". Local activists have further complained that application of herbicides in the replanted areas harms the local ecology, especially rivers.

In summer 2000, protestors from the Yuba Nation chained themselves to SPI logging equipment and vehicles and occupied the company's head office in Grass Valley, California; some protesters did jail time. Soon after, SPI placed continuing logging activities in the Sierra under a moratorium. The Earth Island Institute, through its John Muir Project, investigated SPI over several years and describes itself as "a clearinghouse for SPI-related information". Earth Island Institute has said that SPI "embodies the worst practices in the timber industry" around the turn of the century, and that while other logging companies, such as the Pacific Lumber Company, had been in the spotlight for a decade, SPI "has been quietly plundering the state's forests on a scale that makes Charles Hurwitz (Note: Owner of Pacific Lumber.) look like a novice".

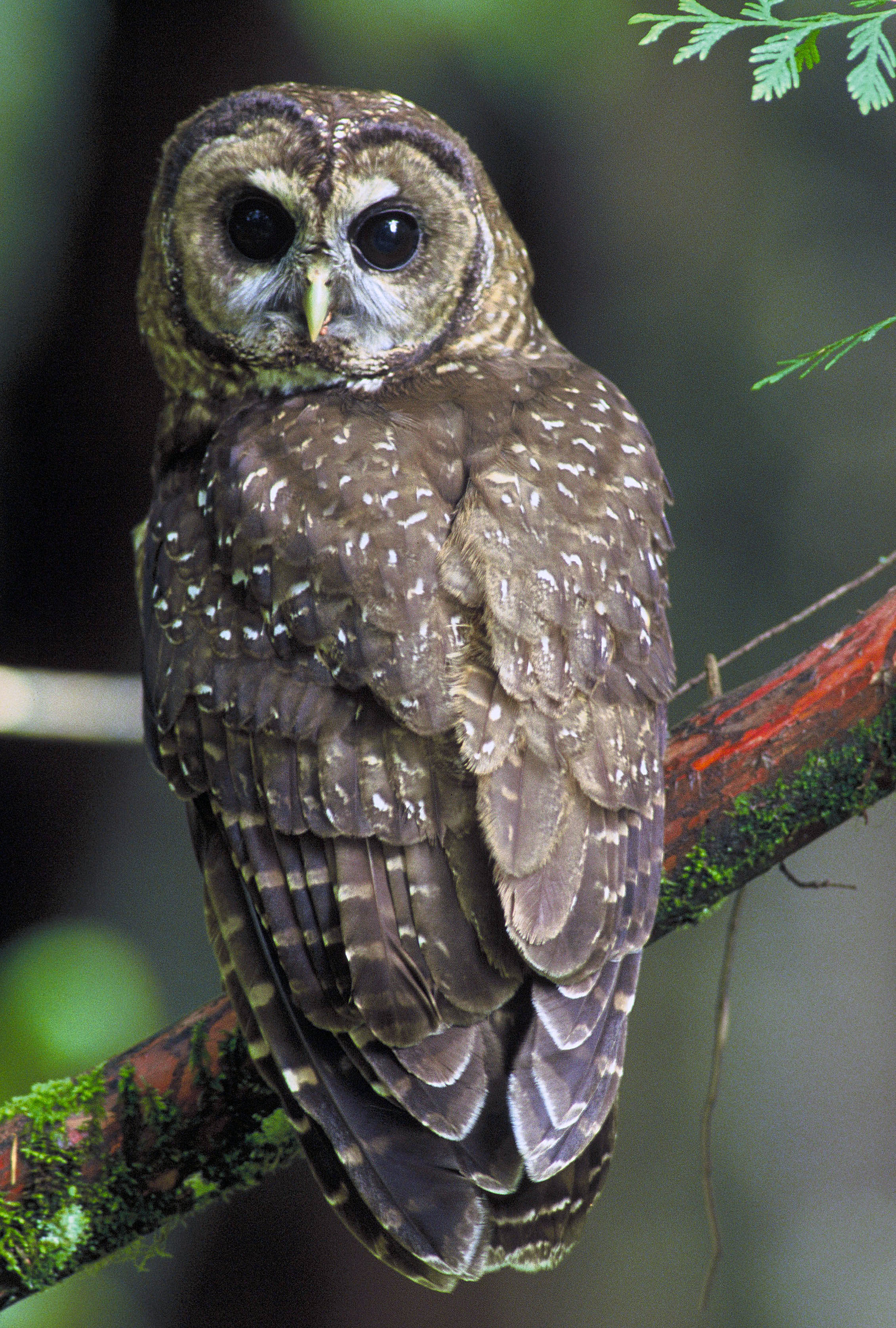
Northern Spotted Owl

In the 1990s, protestors began to target SPI mills in Northern California over concerns for the Northern Spotted Owl, whose habitat is old-growth and mixed-growth forests. The logging industry estimated up to 30,000 of 168,000 jobs would be lost because of the owl's protected status, and indeed the lumber harvest declined by 80% in the Northwest. In turn, supply fell, and consumer prices rose. (Note: However, jobs were already declining because of dwindling old-growth forest harvests and automation of the lumber industry. One study at the University of Wisconsin–Madison by environmental scientists argued that logging jobs had been in a long decline and that environmental protection was not a significant factor in job loss.)

Former Pacific Forest Trust director Dr Andrea Tuttle has identified 1990 as a pivotal year in the political campaign against companies such as SPI. She recalled that several measures intended to limit logging had finally achieved sufficient public support in California to be placed on the ballot as initiatives. Although on election day, they all eventually failed, she recalls receiving a phone call from Red Emmerson telling her, "Andrea, I never want to go through that again. What can we do?". From then on, she says, SPI became part of the debate: "All these pressures were just hammering the industry. It was piling on them from every direction. They were losing their social license to practice forestry in California."

A lawsuit was filed against the company in January 2008 for deforestation. Activists requested the company place itself under the advice of the Forest Stewardship Council. This body—an international non-profit promoting responsible management of forestry—advocates a system of logging certification. In May 2008, SPI's plans for clear-cutting 1,000 acres (1.6 sq mi) in the Sierra foothills were cleared by the California Supreme Court.

=== Pollution ===
In 2007 the State of California announced that SPI had paid fines equalling $13 million (equivalent to $20185363.51 in 2025) in a civil settlement brought by the California Air Resources Board. The allegations related to complaints that several of SPI's mills were operating in breach of their air pollution certification, falsifying reports and monitoring equipment, and discharging waste material to the detriment of their neighbours.

=== Fires ===
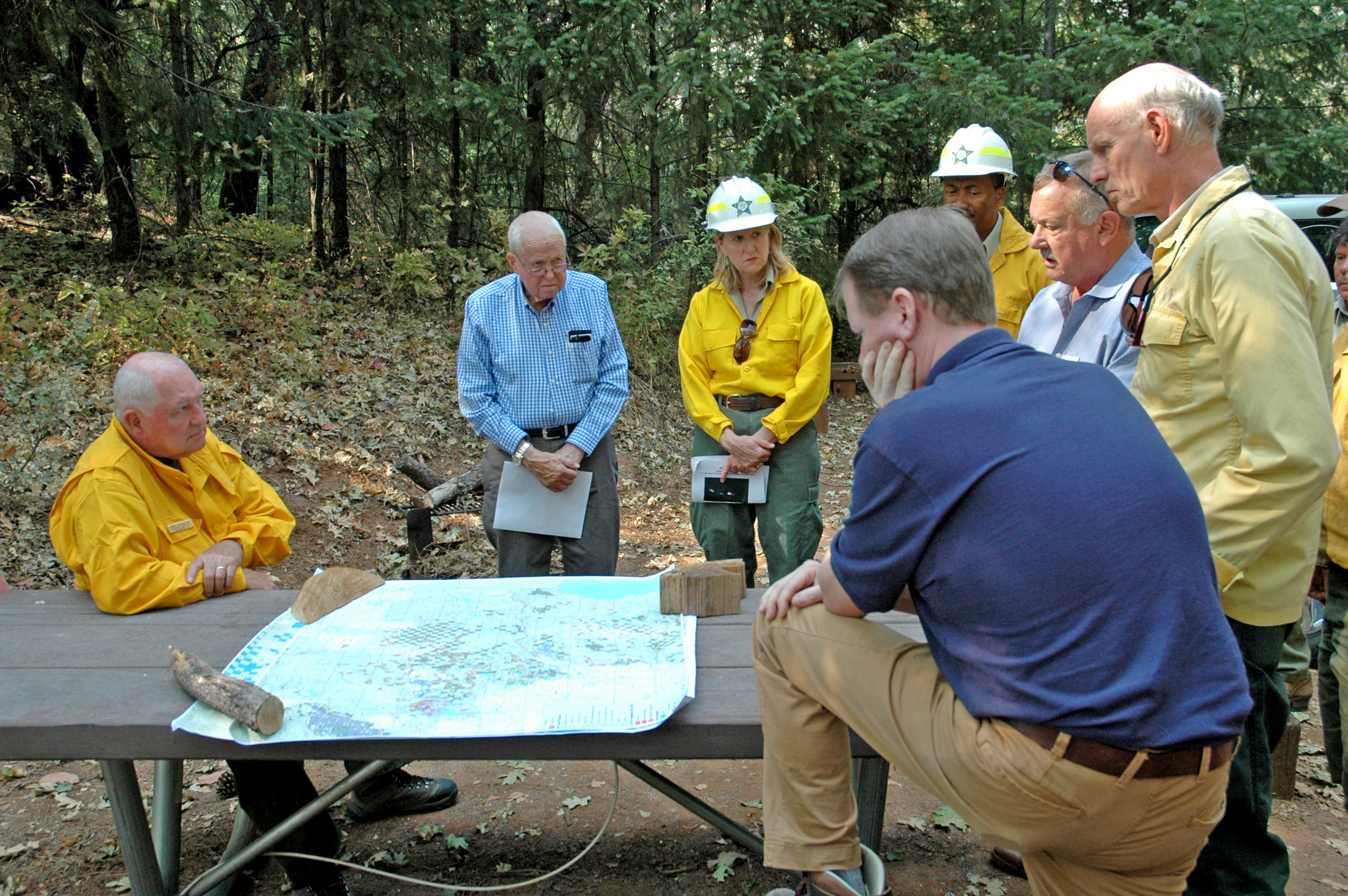
A.A. Emmerson (second from left) and Dan Tomascheski (second from right) of SPI at a meeting on wildfire mitigation during the 2018 Carr Fire

Climate change is intensifying the incidence of drought and the threat of wildfires in California. Sparks from heavy equipment on an SPI site were blamed for the 2007 Moonlight Fire. In 2012, the company agreed to pay a $47 million fine and give up 22,500 acres of land to settle a federal liability lawsuit. The government has been accused of oversimplifying the cause of the fire to make a stronger case against SPI; in 2014 a California Superior Court judge vacated the state's case against SPI over the Moonlight Fire and ordered Cal Fire to pay over $32 million to the company.

SPI has participated in forest thinning intended to mitigate fire risk and in planning for environmental recovery after the 2018 Camp Fire, which destroyed everything SPI had replanted after an earlier fire. The company has been praised by the Deputy Fire Chief of Cal Fire for being "on the forefront of progressive fire prevention practices", particularly through investment in weather prediction technology and meteorological stations, whose data is fed into the National Fire Danger Rating System to provide a more advanced indication of imminent problems.

Economically, SPI's fire salvage logging drew controversy. After the Fountain Fire of 1992, which touched the SPI sawmill at Burney, Red Emmerson commented that the company "had trucks coming down the road that had flames on the back". Forbes reported that following the Rim Fire in Yosemite in 2013, in which 257,000 acres (402 sq mi) was burned, "not long after firefighters doused the flames, a fleet of bulldozers and trucks arrived" from SPI. Due to the company's economic weight, SPI can buy large contracts in salvage logging at a heavy discount when they are announced by the government. SPI pays between a half and a quarter of the usual price for wood that it calculates is often still 90% useful.

== Conservation work ==
SPI is a member of the self-regulated industry body Sustainable Forestry Initiative, which is considered less stringent than the Forest Stewardship Council. (Note: For example, SFI allows more tree farming and requires fewer conservation plans or consultation with local and indigenous stakeholders. However, it does enjoy the support of conservation groups such as the American Bird Conservancy, Ducks Unlimited Canada, Arbor Day Foundation, American Forests, and the Canadian Parks Council.) SPI has also affiliated with the NFWF in relation to the conservation of Sierra Meadows. The company has occasionally sold some of its land to the Trust for Public Land (TPL) to consolidate habitat for wildlife, including 7,000 acres (11 sq mi) near Lake Tahoe and its forest. Some of that land had originally been designated for housing development by SPI. TPL has defended SPI, stating the two organisations had "an excellent working relationship ... We've done a lot of important land conservation together. They've been an extremely reliable landowner to work with." SPI is also a member of the Washington Forest Protection Association, a trade association.

The company's 100-Year Sustained Management Plan, published in 2000, sets goals that include, in addition to more than doubling sustainable harvest yields and tripling the average diameter of SPI trees, providing habitat on SPI lands for all species known to use them, and increasing real numbers of specific species including the Northern Spotted Owl, and maintaining cold, clear waters in salmon streams so as to retain existing fish species and enable reintroduction of new species by the company. In land previously cut down by SPI, some species have apparently undergone a population boom, such as the blacktail deer and black bear as a result of new food sources being revealed.

In 2009, SPI started a living gene bank of trees using seeds harvested from Sequoia National Park with permission from the National Park Service. It distributed the seeds across its land, with some planted far north of their original environment. This was followed a new policy of carbon sequestration. Several scientists writing in Forest Ecology and Management stated that such a program was intended to "protect the genetic diversity of giant sequoia and expand the current range within California" for perpetuity, while monetizing the profits from the concomitant gains in carbon storage.

== Cogeneration ==
SPI is a pioneer of cogeneration plants, which use waste including bark, wood chips, and sawdust to produce heat and power. Its first cogeneration plant, in Quincy, produced 3 MW and powered the sawmill; the cogeneration plant at its Anderson sawmill produces 32 MW.

== Sierra Pacific Foundation ==
SPI created a private foundation in 1979, with the stated purposes of raising money for its workers' dependents to go to college, as well as broader investment in youth and community projects. Red Emmerson's wife, Ida, served as president; she was succeeded by their daughter, Carolyn Dietz.

The Foundation has made several grants and donations. In 2015, it committed $6 million to Oregon State University's wood laboratory to expand its development. In return, the laboratory was named for Red Emmerson. Three years later, following the Carr Fire, it donated $1.1 million towards the Whiskeytown Environment School and another $750,000 for the rebuilding of damaged housing. It also donated $2,000 to the Hoquiam Fire Department to help fight wildfires.
