= Eric O'Keefe =

American journalist

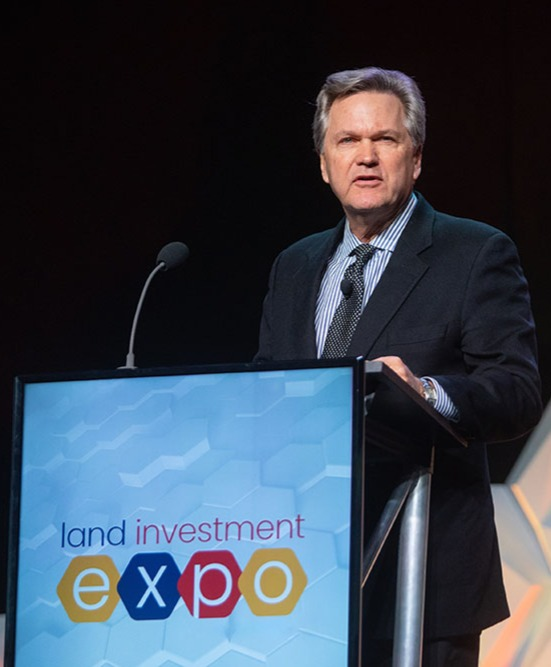
- Speaking at the 2023 Land Investment Expo in Des Moines, Iowa.
- Born: March 11, 1961 (age 65)
- Education: Rice University
- Occupations: Author, journalist, editor
- Website: www.ericokeefe.com

Eric O'Keefe (born March 11, 1961) is an American author, editor, and journalist based in Texas. He authored the book The Cup (2009) and co-wrote the screenplay for the Village Roadshow feature film The Cup (2011) starring Brendan Gleeson. His most recent book is the Palm Beach polo murder mystery The Perfect 10. O'Keefe has served as the editor-in-chief of The Land Report since its founding in 2007. O’Keefe’s investigative reporting has resulted in numerous breaking news stories, including identifying Bill Gates as the largest private farmland owner in the United States with 242,000 acres in 16 states. O’Keefe broke the story of the sale of T. Boone Pickens's Mesa Vista Ranch and revealed Shanda Group founder Chen Tianqiao to be the owner of 198,000 acres of Oregon timberland. He also broke the story of the Texas General Land Office buying the 353,785-Acre Brewster Ranch from Brad Kelley.

== Life and career ==
=== Author ===
O'Keefe's The Cup (2009) is the story of Damien Oliver's dramatic victory on Media Puzzle in the world's richest and most prestigious two-mile handicap, the Melbourne Cup. The week before the race, Damien's only brother, Jason, died following a track accident in Perth while riding an unraced horse at Ascot Racecourse. The tragedy bore a haunting similarity to the death of their father, Ray Oliver, who died in 1975 after a racing fall in the Boulder Cup in Kalgoorlie. Damien's decision to honor his brother by returning and competing in Australia's greatest race culminated in Media Puzzle's emotion-charged victory, which has been rated one of the memorable moments in Australian sports history. O'Keefe traveled to Australia, Dubai, and Ireland to research The Cup, which was published in Australia by Slattery Media and launched in the Committee Room at Flemington Racecourse on August 4, 2009.

The Cup was made into the feature film The Cup based on a script by O'Keefe and Australian director Simon Wincer. Filmed in Melbourne in 2010 and released in Australia in 2011, the movie was directed by Wincer with Stephen Curry cast as Damien Oliver, Daniel MacPherson as Jason Oliver, Brendan Gleeson as Dermot Weld, and Tom Burlinson as Dave Phillips.

The Perfect 10 (2020) is O'Keefe's first work of fiction. The Palm Beach murder mystery marks the debut of Rick Hunt, a West Point graduate tasked with assisting the Secret Service investigate the murder of Juancito Harrington, the world’s greatest polo player. Hunt’s skills as a polo player not only aid in the investigation, they also land him a place on Senator King Kenedy’s polo team after the senator is injured while playing. Hunt ultimately determines that Juancito’s murderer was in fact his brother and confronts Cesare Harrington during the final of the US Open Polo Championship at the National Polo Center in Wellington, Florida.

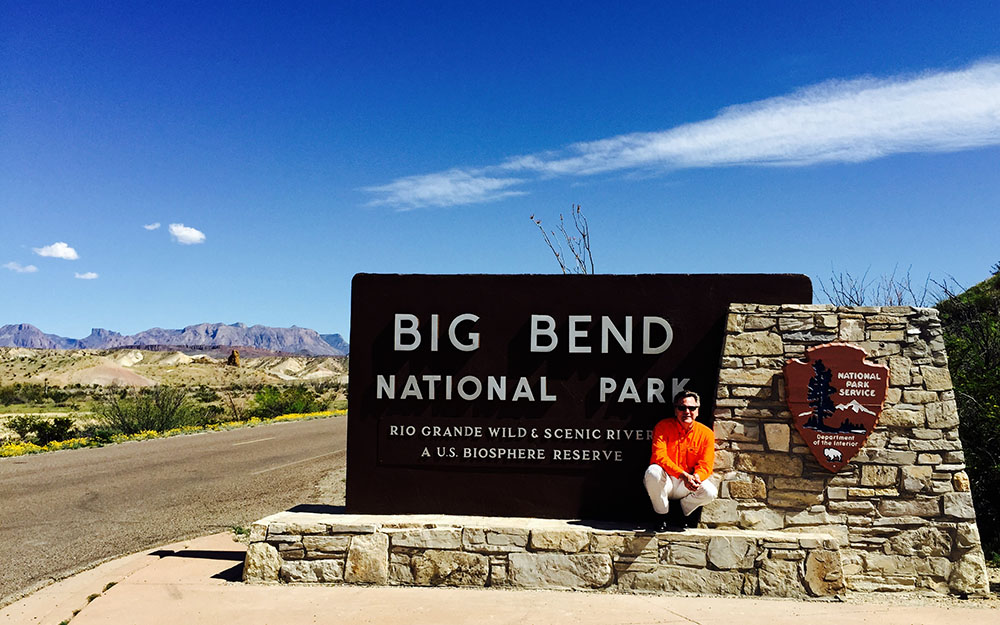
On assignment in Big Bend National Park in 2015.

O’Keefe collaborated with T. Boone Pickens to write the Texas oilman’s memoir, The First Billion is the Hardest (2008). O'Keefe has written numerous guidebooks, including the Texas Monthly Guidebook to West Texas and the Big Bend (1995), the Texas Monthly Guidebook to El Paso (1996), and the Lone Star Guide to Big Bend and West Texas (1999). He was a contributing author to the Texas Monthly Guidebook to Texas (1998) and the Lone Star Guide to Texas (1999). He authored The Art of Chuck DeHaan (2005) with photography by Gustav Schmiege.

=== Editor ===
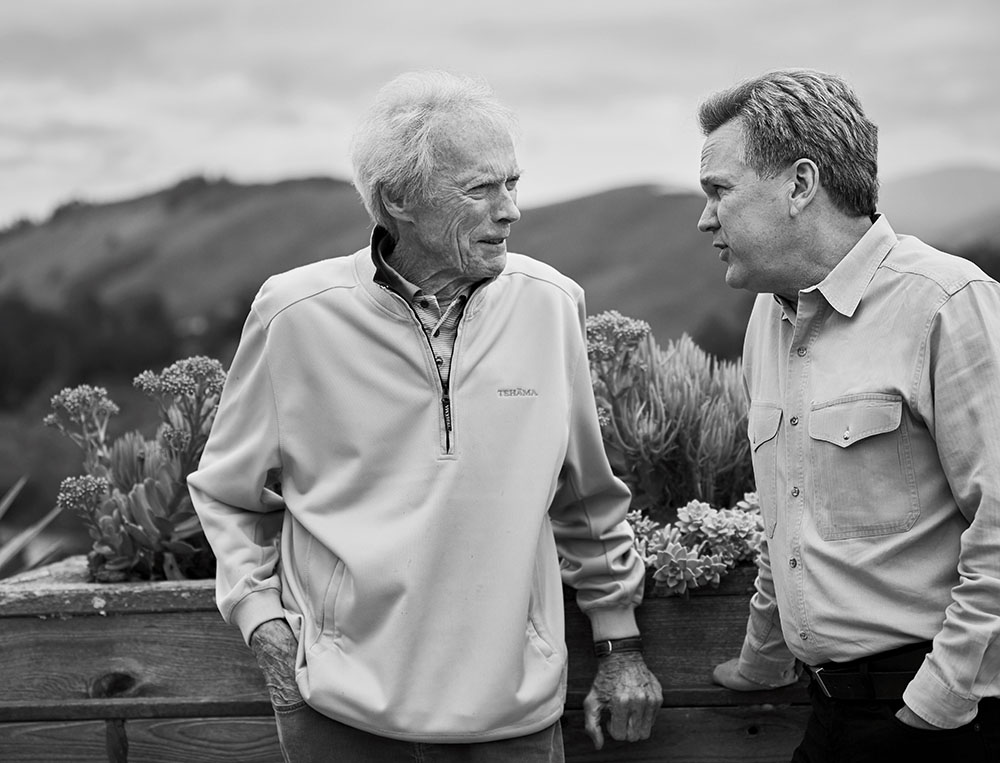
Interviewing Clint Eastwood in 2019

In 2006, O'Keefe co-founded The Land Report with Eddie Lee Rider Jr. Known as the Magazine of the American Landowner, the quarterly magazine and website focus on topics of interest to landowners and those who invest in land. The magazine is best known for its annual survey of America's largest landowners, the Land Report 100. In his capacity as editor, O'Keefe is regularly called upon to comment on topics pertaining to land and landowners and has been featured in The Washington Post, The Wall Street Journal, and The New York Times.

O'Keefe, who is a registered broker with the Texas Real Estate Commission, serves as the magazine's editor and Rider its publisher.

In his editorial capacities at The Land Report, O'Keefe has interviewed landowners such as Clint Eastwood, Tom Brokaw, Nolan Ryan, Joe Montana, Drew Bledsoe, T. Boone Pickens, and Ted Turner. His in-depth profile of Red Emmerson detailed Emmerson's rise from independent sawmill operator in 1949 to America's largest private landowner in 2022 with 2.33 million acres of timberland in California, Oregon, and Washington.

=== Journalist ===
Since 1996, O'Keefe has freelanced for The New York Times on a wide variety of subjects, including Carl Icahn, the NFL, and Willie Nelson. In 1997, O'Keefe was one of the first journalists to report on the shooting death of 18-year-old Esequiel Hernandez Jr. by Cpl. Clemente Banuelos, a U.S. Marine on a drug interdiction training mission near Redford, Texas. The high school student was the first U.S. civilian killed by active duty military personnel since the Kent State shootings in 1970. O'Keefe also reported for The Times on the 1998 settlement by the Department of the Navy and the Justice Department with the Hernandez family. The shooting subsequently inspired The Three Burials of Melquiades Estrada (2005), a movie directed by and starring Tommy Lee Jones.

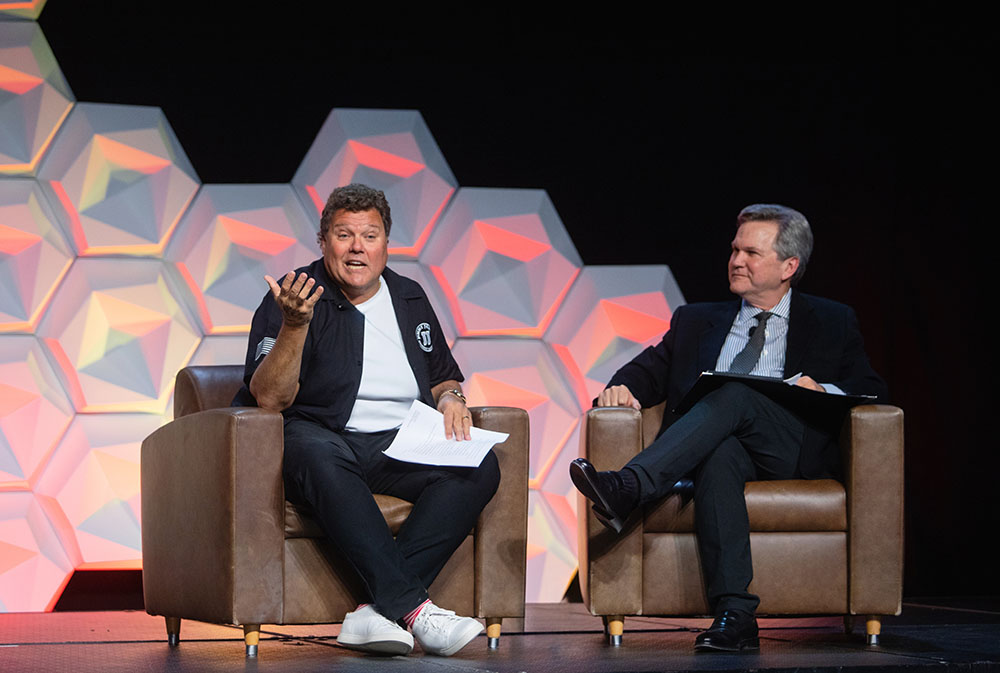
Interviewing Jimmy John Liautaud in 2023.

Huffington Post, Western Horseman, Cigar Aficionado, and D Magazine are some of the other media to feature O'Keefe's writings, including profiles and interviews of actors, entertainers, authors, business leaders, and political figures such as Hank Aaron, Norman Brinker, George W. Bush, Bill Clinton, Julia Child, Russell Crowe, Billy Crystal, Brian Dennehy, Robert Duvall, Dean Fearing, Kinky Friedman, Memo Gracida, Tommy Lee Jones, Jay Leno, Reba McEntire, Sheikh Mohammed bin Rashid Al Maktoum, Bernadette Peters, Ann Richards, Tom Selleck, Sam Shepard, and Sam Zell.

Since 2021, O’Keefe has served as master of ceremonies at the Land Investment Expo in Des Moines and has interviewed a wide range of nationally known figures at the annual conference, including hedge fund manager Kyle Bass, Ambassador Terry Branstad, Steve Eisman of Big Short fame, former Kansas City Federal Reserve Bank presidents Esther George and Thomas Hoenig, Jimmy John’s founder Jimmy John Liautaud, and Equity Group Investments chairman Sam Zell.
