= Red Emmerson =

American businessman (born 1929)

- Born: Archie Aldis Emmerson; 1929 (age 96–97); Grand Ronde, Oregon, US
- Occupations: Founder, Sierra Pacific Industries
- Children: 3

Archie Aldis "Red" Emmerson (born 1929) is an American billionaire businessman, and the founder of Sierra Pacific Industries, a lumber products company that operates in California, Oregon and Washington. With 2.33 million acres, Emmerson and his family ranked as America's largest private landowners, according to a profile by Eric O’Keefe in the 2021 Land Report 100. As of March 2024, they had a net worth of US$5.4 billion.

== Early life ==
Born in Grand Ronde, Oregon in 1929, and lived his early years in meager surroundings. He attended school while his father, R.H. "Curly" Emmerson built sawmills in Oregon and California.

== Career ==
In 1948, at age 19, Emmerson arrived in Arcata, California where he began working in mills learning as much as he could about every job in the plant.

In 1949, Emmerson and his father formed a partnership and went into the lumber business together, eventually producing manufacturing facilities in the northwest. Under Emmerson's management the company grew into Sierra Pacific Industries (SPI) – now the second largest lumber producer in the U.S.

According to the Land Report 100, the Emmerson family was the largest private landowner in the United States until losing the title in 2026 to Stan Kroenke.

== Philanthropy ==
Through the Sierra Pacific Foundation, the Emmersons have given millions of dollars in community contributions. The Foundation was established in 1979 by Red's father. Over the years, Red has continued to fund the Foundation to meet its philanthropic commitment to organizations, community projects, youth activities, and student scholarships for the communities where the company has operating facilities.

== Political activity ==
Emmerson contributed $45,000 to Donald Trump's 2020 presidential campaign.

== Personal life ==
He has three children and lives in Redding, California. His sons George and Mark are president and chairman of SPI. His daughter Carolyn is the president of the Sierra Pacific Foundation. His wife of 40 years, Ida, died of breast cancer in 1996.

== Recognition ==
- 1998 Golden Plate Award of the American Academy of Achievement
- 2008 New California Hall of Fame
- 2019 Timber Processing magazine's Person of the Year
- 2019 West Coast Lumber & Building Material Association (WCLBMA) Lifetime Achievement Award
