= Swansboro Country Airport =

Swansboro Country Property Owners Association Airport
- IATA: none; ICAO: 01CL; FAA LID: 01CL

Summary
- Airport type: Private
- Owner: Swansboro Country Property Owners Assoc.
- Location: Placerville, California
- Elevation AMSL: 2,594 ft / 791 m
- Coordinates: 38°47′59″N 120°44′03″W

Map
- Location

Runways
Direction	Length		Surface
Direction	ft	m	Surface
9/27	3,100	945	Asphalt

Statistics (1969)
- Based aircraft: 25
- Source: Federal Aviation Administration

Swansboro Country Airport (ICAO: 01CL, FAA LID: 01CL) is four air miles (6 km) northeast of Placerville, in El Dorado County, California. It is owned by the Swansboro Country Property Owners Association.

Most U.S. airports use the same three-letter location identifier for the FAA and IATA, but Swansboro is 01CL to the FAA and has no IATA code.

== Facilities ==
Swansboro Country Airport covers 9 acres (3.6 ha) and has one asphalt runway, 9/27, which is 3,100 ft × 50 ft (945 m × 15 m). The runways slopes downhill to the west. Night operations are prohibited, and is unattended.

The airport has 25 aircraft are based at the airport: 21 single engine, 3 multi-engine and 1 helicopter.

== History ==
Swansboro Country Airport was established in 1969 to transport real estate agents and their clients from the then-new Swansboro Country subdivision, the first rural subdivision in El Dorado County. The original airstrip, created by the US Forest Service, was expanded and is now privately owned, and use is restricted to property owners and their guests.

During the 2014 King Fire, the airfield was used as a staging area for fire trucks, crew trucks and heavy equipment.
