= The Cup (2011 film) =

2011 film by Simon Wincer

- Theatrical release poster
- Directed by: Simon Wincer
- Written by: Eric O'Keefe; Simon Wincer
- Produced by: Jan Bladier; David Lee; Simon Wincer
- Starring: Brendan Gleeson; Stephen Curry; Daniel MacPherson; Tom Burlinson
- Cinematography: David Burr
- Edited by: David Pulbrook
- Music by: Bruce Rowland
- Production companies: Screen Australia; Sliver Lion Films; Film Victoria; Myriad Pictures; Ingenious Broadcasting; Horizon Films
- Distributed by: Roadshow Films
- Release date: 13 October 2011
- Running time: 99 minutes
- Country: Australia
- Language: English

The Cup is a 2011 Australian biographical film directed by Simon Wincer. The film is about the 2002 Melbourne Cup race won by Damien Oliver. Starring Brendan Gleeson, Stephen Curry, Daniel MacPherson, Tom Burlinson and Bill Hunter, in his final film before his death.

== Plot ==
The Melbourne Cup is called The Race That Stops a Nation, but never in the history of Australia's 150-year-old Thoroughbred Classic has there been so dramatic a contest as the 2002 running. The Cup follows the world's finest horsemen as they plot their paths across the globe – from Europe, the Middle East, and Asia – and into the Winners Circle of the richest and most prestigious two-mile handicap. But the heart of this true story is a young Australian jockey, Damien Oliver, who loses his only brother in a tragic racing accident just days before the great race. To make matters worse, the same fate claimed Damien and Jason Oliver's father decades before. Following his brother's death, Damien suffers through an almost endless series of discouraging defeats only to triumph on one of sport's greatest stages in one of the most thrilling finales in all of sport.

== Cast ==
- Brendan Gleeson as Dermot Weld
- Stephen Curry as Damien Oliver
- Daniel MacPherson as Jason Oliver
- Tom Burlinson as Dave Phillips
- Rodger Corser as Jason McCartney
- Jodi Gordon as Trish Oliver
- Martin Sacks as Neil Pinner
- Shaun Micallef as Lee Freedman
- Bill Hunter as Bart Cummings
- Nick Simpson-Deeks as Pat Smullen
- Colleen Hewett as Pat Oliver
- Andrew Curry as Ray Oliver
- Reg Gorman as Vern
- Marty Fields as Shearer Bookie

== Reception ==
The Cup received mixed to negative reviews, currently holding a Rotten Tomatoes approval rating of 28%.

Joe Leydon of Variety gave a positive review, saying "Although it canters down a well-trod path toward a predictable finish line, The Cup sustains interest through the smooth efficiency of its storytelling and the engaging performances of its lead players." Sandra Hall of The Sydney Morning Herald called it "a shamelessly old-fashioned picture but if you like horses and fancy cantering off into the land of wish-fulfilment for a couple of hours, why not?"

Luke Buckmaster of Crikey.com gave a negative review, saying "Director Simon Wincer was not the right person to avoid certain temptations, like dunking the audience's noggins into a honey pot of clichés." Mike McGranaghan of Aisle Seat thought the film was a "pleasant-enough viewing experience. At the same time, I was never as riveted as I have been by other, similarly-themed films. It makes you feel good without ever truly stirring the soul."

== See also ==
- List of films about horses
- List of films about horse racing
- The Cup (book)
