= Montgomery Creek, California =

Montgomery Creek
- Unincorporated Community; Census Designated Place
- Location in Shasta County and the state of California
- Coordinates: 40°50′25″N 121°55′11″W
- Country: United States
- State: California
- County: Shasta

Area
  - Total: 3.300 sq mi (8.548 km^{2})
  - Land: 3.253 sq mi (8.424 km^{2})
  - Water: 0.048 sq mi (0.124 km^{2}) 1.45%
- Elevation: 2,130 ft (650 m)

Population (2020)
  - Total: 176
  - Density: 54.1/sq mi (20.9/km^{2})
- Time zone: UTC-8 (Pacific (PST))
  - Summer (DST): UTC-7 (PDT)
- ZIP code: 96065
- Area code: 530
- FIPS code: 06-48998
- GNIS feature ID: 0263769

Montgomery Creek is a census-designated place in Shasta County, California, United States. Its population is 176 as of the 2020 census, up from 163 from the 2010 census. The town and associated creek were named after Zachariah Montgomery.

== Geography ==
Montgomery Creek is located at 40°50′25″N 121°55′11″W (40.840230, -121.919586).

According to the United States Census Bureau, the CDP has a total area of 3.3 square miles (8.5 km^{2}), of which 98.55% is land and 1.45% is water.

== Demographics ==
Historical population
Census	Pop.	Note	%±
2000	96		—
2010	163		69.8%
2020	176		8.0%
U.S. Decennial Census; 1860–1870 1880-1890; 1900 1910 1920; 1930 1940 1950; 1960 1970 1980; 1990 2000 2010

Montgomery Creek first appeared as a census designated place in the 2000 U.S. census.

=== 2020 ===
The 2020 United States census reported that Montgomery Creek had a population of 176. The population density was 54.1 inhabitants per square mile (20.9/km^{2}). The racial makeup of Montgomery Creek was 107 (60.8%) White, 0 (0.0%) African American, 50 (28.4%) Native American, 2 (1.1%) Asian, 0 (0.0%) Pacific Islander, 2 (1.1%) from other races, and 15 (8.5%) from two or more races. Hispanic or Latino of any race were 13 persons (7.4%).

The whole population lived in households. There were 71 households, out of which 22 (31.0%) had children under the age of 18 living in them, 29 (40.8%) were married-couple households, 6 (8.5%) were cohabiting couple households, 19 (26.8%) had a female householder with no partner present, and 17 (23.9%) had a male householder with no partner present. 13 households (18.3%) were one person, and 3 (4.2%) were one person aged 65 or older. The average household size was 2.48. There were 53 families (74.6% of all households).

The age distribution was 32 people (18.2%) under the age of 18, 15 people (8.5%) aged 18 to 24, 40 people (22.7%) aged 25 to 44, 51 people (29.0%) aged 45 to 64, and 38 people (21.6%) who were 65 years of age or older. The median age was 45.3 years. There were 111 males and 65 females.

There were 90 housing units at an average density of 27.7 units per square mile (10.7 units/km^{2}), of which 71 (78.9%) were occupied. Of these, 59 (83.1%) were owner-occupied, and 12 (16.9%) were occupied by renters.

=== 2010 ===
The 2010 United States census reported that Montgomery Creek had a population of 163. The population density was 49.4 inhabitants per square mile (19.1/km^{2}). The racial makeup of Montgomery Creek was 117 (71.8%) White, 2 (1.2%) African American, 16 (9.8%) Native American, 0 (0.0%) Asian, 0 (0.0%) Pacific Islander, 9 (5.5%) from other races, and 19 (11.7%) from two or more races. Hispanic or Latino of any race were 18 persons (11.0%).

The Census reported that 151 people (92.6% of the population) lived in households, 0 (0%) lived in non-institutionalized group quarters, and 12 (7.4%) were institutionalized.

There were 61 households, out of which 20 (32.8%) had children under the age of 18 living in them, 24 (39.3%) were opposite-sex married couples living together, 10 (16.4%) had a female householder with no husband present, 5 (8.2%) had a male householder with no wife present. There were 5 (8.2%) unmarried opposite-sex partnerships, and 2 (3.3%) same-sex married couples or partnerships. 17 households (27.9%) were made up of individuals, and 8 (13.1%) had someone living alone who was 65 years of age or older. The average household size was 2.48. There were 39 families (63.9% of all households); the average family size was 3.05.

The population was spread out, with 48 people (29.4%) under the age of 18, 12 people (7.4%) aged 18 to 24, 30 people (18.4%) aged 25 to 44, 48 people (29.4%) aged 45 to 64, and 25 people (15.3%) who were 65 years of age or older. The median age was 40.4 years. For every 100 females, there were 109.0 males. For every 100 females age 18 and over, there were 98.3 males.

There were 69 housing units at an average density of 20.9 per square mile (8.1/km^{2}), of which 42 (68.9%) were owner-occupied, and 19 (31.1%) were occupied by renters. The homeowner vacancy rate was 2.3%; the rental vacancy rate was 0%. 93 people (57.1% of the population) lived in owner-occupied housing units and 58 people (35.6%) lived in rental housing units.

=== 2000 ===
As of the census of 2000, the median income for a household in the CDP was $26,250, and the median income for a family was $26,750. Males had a median income of $30,000 versus $0 for females. The per capita income for the CDP was $9,211. There were 29.6% of families and 33.3% of the population living below the poverty line, including 47.2% of under eighteens and none of those over 64.

== Politics ==
In the state legislature Montgomery Creek is in the 1st senatorial district, represented by Republican Megan Dahle, and the 1st Assembly district, represented by Republican Heather Hadwick.

Federally, Montgomery Creek is in California's 1st congressional district, represented by Republican James Gallagher.

== History ==
In August 1992, the Fountain Fire burned many homes and structures in Montgomery Creek and neighboring Round Mountain. Firefighters were able to save most of the structures in 'downtown' Montgomery Creek.

== Notable people ==
Actor Craig T. Nelson lived in Montgomery Creek while working as a janitor at Cedar Creek Elementary School. Christopher Featherston, 9/11 Pentagon survivor and Intelligence Analyst at the National Security Council in the White House, went to 3rd and 4th grade in Cedar Creek Elementary School.

== See also ==
- List of census-designated places in California
