= King Fire =

2014 wildfire in Northern California

- Part of the 2014 California wildfires
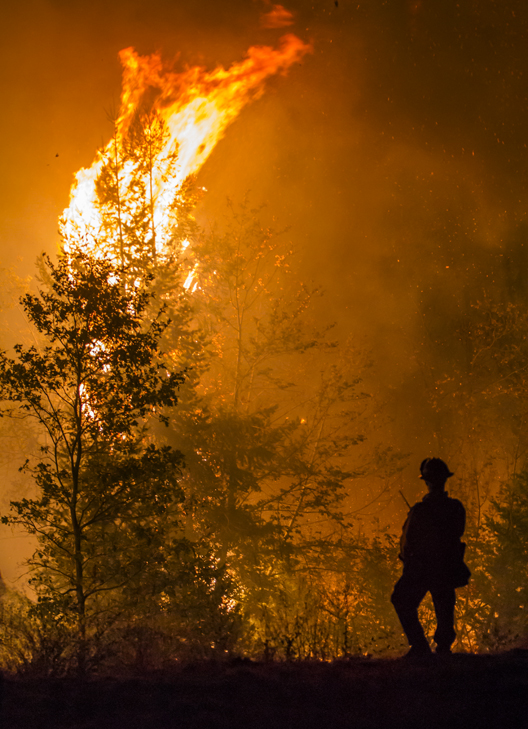
- A USFS firefighter watches the King Fire torching trees near Pollock Pines on September 14, 2014
- Date: September 13 –; October 9, 2014; (27 days)
- Location: El Dorado County, California, United States
- Coordinates: 38.782°N 120.604°W

Statistics
- Burned area: 97,717 acres (39,545 ha; 153 sq mi; 395 km^{2})

Impacts
- Deaths: 0
- Injuries: 12
- Evacuated: 2,830
- Structures destroyed: 12 residences; 68 outbuildings
- Cost: $117 million; (equivalent to about $157 million in 2025)

Ignition
- Cause: Arson

Map
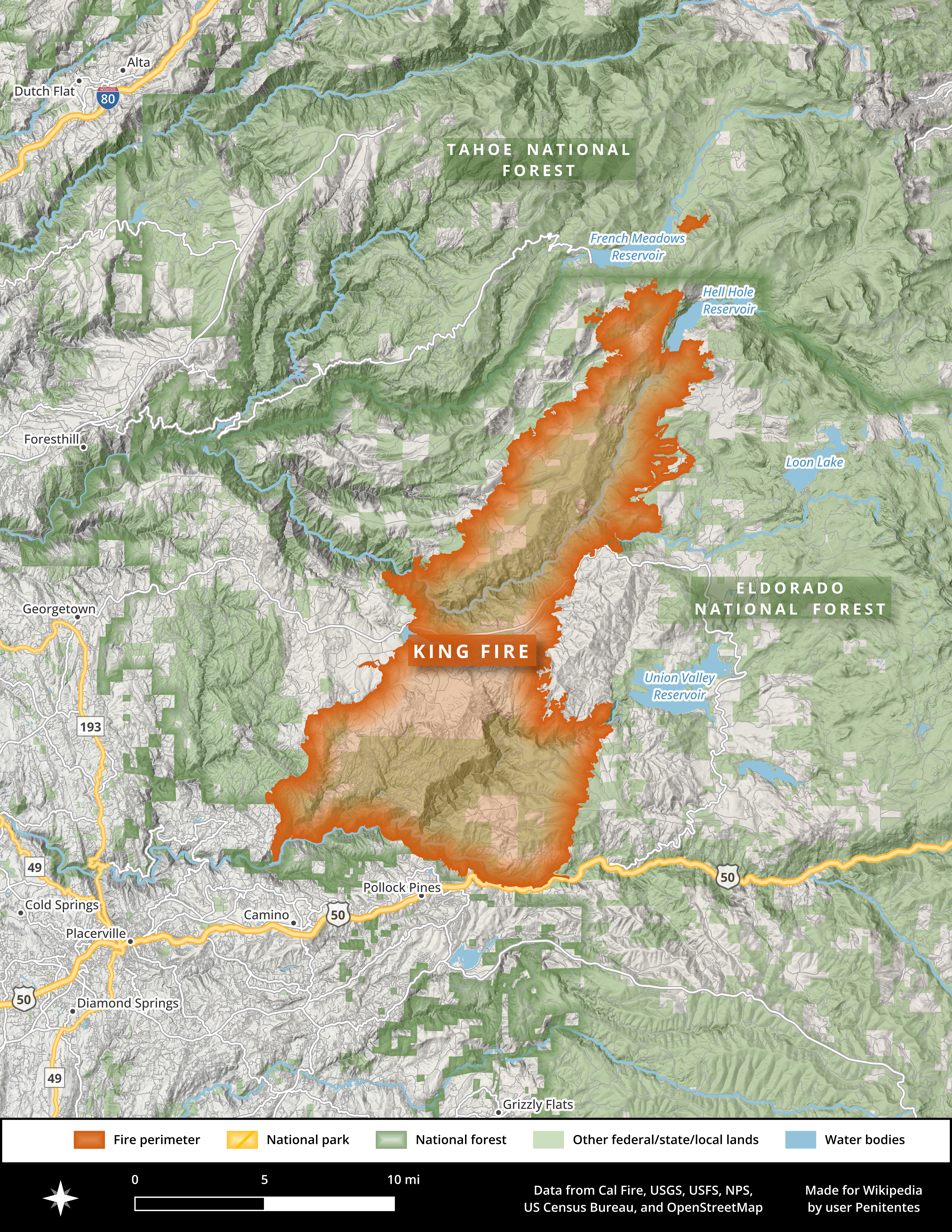
- The footprint of the King Fire, west of Lake Tahoe and north of U.S. Route 50

- Location of fire in Northern California

The 2014 King Fire was a large wildfire in El Dorado County, California, which burned 97,717 acres (39,545 hectares) primarily in the Eldorado National Forest. The wildfire started on September 13, 2014, near Pollock Pines, California, to the east of Sacramento. The ensuing fire suppression effort, which cost more than $100 million and engaged more than 8,000 personnel at its peak, allowed for the full containment of the King Fire by October 9, 2014. Despite the size and ferocity of the fire, it caused no deaths. Eighty structures were destroyed, the majority of them outbuildings. The King Fire was determined to have been caused by an act of arson and a suspect was swiftly apprehended and convicted in 2016.

== Background ==
Much of the Eldorado National Forest where the King Fire burned had no recent fire history. The last major wildfire there had been the Cleveland Fire in 1992, which burned roughly 22,500 acres (9,100 ha). This lack of recent burn activity left an area that had remained lush and unscorched for over two decades, allowing a massive accumulation of hazardous forest fuels and underbrush.

Additionally, the Eldorado National Forest was under extreme, multi-year drought conditions, which drastically reduced vegetation moisture levels to near-record lows. This severe dryness turned the dense timber and brittle ground vegetation into highly volatile kindle, drastically increasing both the ignition risk and the potential severity of any fire. Combined with the rugged canyon terrain and steep mountain topography characteristic of the Sierra Nevada region, these volatile environmental conditions primed the landscape for rapid, uncontrollable fire behavior and long-range spotting ahead of the main front.

== Progression ==
The King Fire began on Saturday, September 13, 2014. It was ignited by an act of arson along King of the Mountain Road—from which the fire got its name—in Pollock Pines, a small community along U.S. Route 50 in the western Sierra Nevada between Sacramento and Lake Tahoe.

On September 16, three days after starting, the fire had spread to 11,520 hectares (115.2 km^{2}), forcing the evacuation of over five hundred homes. A handcrew of ten inmates and a fire captain were saved from being overrun when they were led to safety by a helicopter that was staged at the nearby Swansboro Country Airport.

On September 17, the fire underwent a rapid expansion, pushing forward 15 miles (24 km) and burning an additional 50,000 acres (20,000 ha). Firebrands and embers created spot fires more than three miles (4.8 km) downwind of the main fire. California governor Jerry Brown declared a state of emergency in El Dorado County, citing the fire's threat to water and power infrastructure.

By September 18, the fire had expanded to 73,184 acres (29,617 ha), becoming the second largest wildfire of the 2014 California wildfire season.

By the start of October the fire had grown to 97,099 acres (39,295 ha) with containment increasing to 94%. On October 9, the perimeter of the King Fire was reported to be 100% contained, with a final acreage of 97,717 acres (39,545 ha). The U.S. Forest Service calculated the total cost of fighting the King Fire at approximately $117 million.

== Cause ==
The firefighters first on scene detected multiple points of origin for the King Fire, leading the El Dorado County District Attorney’s Office to swiftly conclude that arson had been the cause. Within days, witnesses came forward and disclosed that they had encountered Wayne Huntsman, a Pollock Pines resident and former inmate firefighter, near the scene of the fire's origin. Huntsman had told two of them "You better get home. Your house is going to burn down." After being given a ride near the fire, Huntsman had shown another man a 'selfie' video of himself in the forest, surrounded by flames. The man recorded Huntsman's video and submitted the information to authorities.

On September 18, 2014, Wayne Huntsman was arrested on suspicion of intentionally starting the fire. He initially pled not guilty to the charges, but in April 2016 pled guilty to arson. He was sentenced to 20 years in prison, the maximum allowable sentence, and ordered to pay $60 million in restitution by an El Dorado County Superior Court judge.

== Effects ==
The King Fire injured a total of twelve people. It destroyed 12 residences and 68 other structures.

=== Closures and evacuations ===
The King Fire threatened hydroelectric infrastructure and recreation areas throughout the Sierra Nevada west of Tahoe. The U.S. Forest Service closed trails to the Desolation Wilderness from the Eldorado National Forest on September 11. The total number of evacuees reached 2,830.

=== Environmental impacts ===
The King Fire produced copious amounts of smoke, pushing parts of Placer, El Dorado, Nevada, and Amador counties into unhealthy-to-hazardous ranges of PM2.5 air pollution. Officials temporarily deployed emergency air-quality sensors throughout the Sierra.

== Growth and containment ==
Fire containment status Gray: contained; Red: active; %: percent contained;
Date	Area burned in acres (ha)	Personnel	Containment
Sep 13	...	...	...
Sep 14	3,000 acres (1,214 ha)	806 personnel	
Sep 15	8,600 acres (3,480 ha)	1,477 personnel	
Sep 16	12,780 acres (5,172 ha)	2,466 personnel	
Sep 17	27,930 acres (11,303 ha)	3,367 personnel	
Sep 18	73,184 acres (29,617 ha)	3,842 personnel	
Sep 19	76,376 acres (30,908 ha)	4,936 personnel	
Sep 20	80,944 acres (32,757 ha)	4,901 personnel	
Sep 21	82,018 acres (33,192 ha)	5,557 personnel	
Sep 22	...	...	...
Sep 23	...	...	...
Sep 24	92,960 acres (37,620 ha)	7,952 personnel	
Sep 25	95,347 acres (38,586 ha)	8,061 personnel	
Sep 26	97,099 acres (39,295 ha)	7,214 personnel	
Sep 27	97,099 acres (39,295 ha)	5,863 personnel	
Sep 28	97,099 acres (39,295 ha)	4,878 personnel	
Sep 29	97,099 acres (39,295 ha)	3,401 personnel	
Sep 30	97,099 acres (39,295 ha)	2,364 personnel	
Oct 1	97,099 acres (39,295 ha)	2,557 personnel	
Oct 2	97,718 acres (39,545 ha)	2,451 personnel	
Oct 3	97,717 acres (39,545 ha)	2,382 personnel	
Oct 4	97,717 acres (39,545 ha)	2,095 personnel	
Oct 5	97,717 acres (39,545 ha)	1,904 personnel	
Oct 6	97,717 acres (39,545 ha)	1,734 personnel	
Oct 7	97,717 acres (39,545 ha)	1,734 personnel	
Oct 8	97,717 acres (39,545 ha)	...	...
Oct 9	97,717 acres (39,545 ha)	...	

== Gallery ==
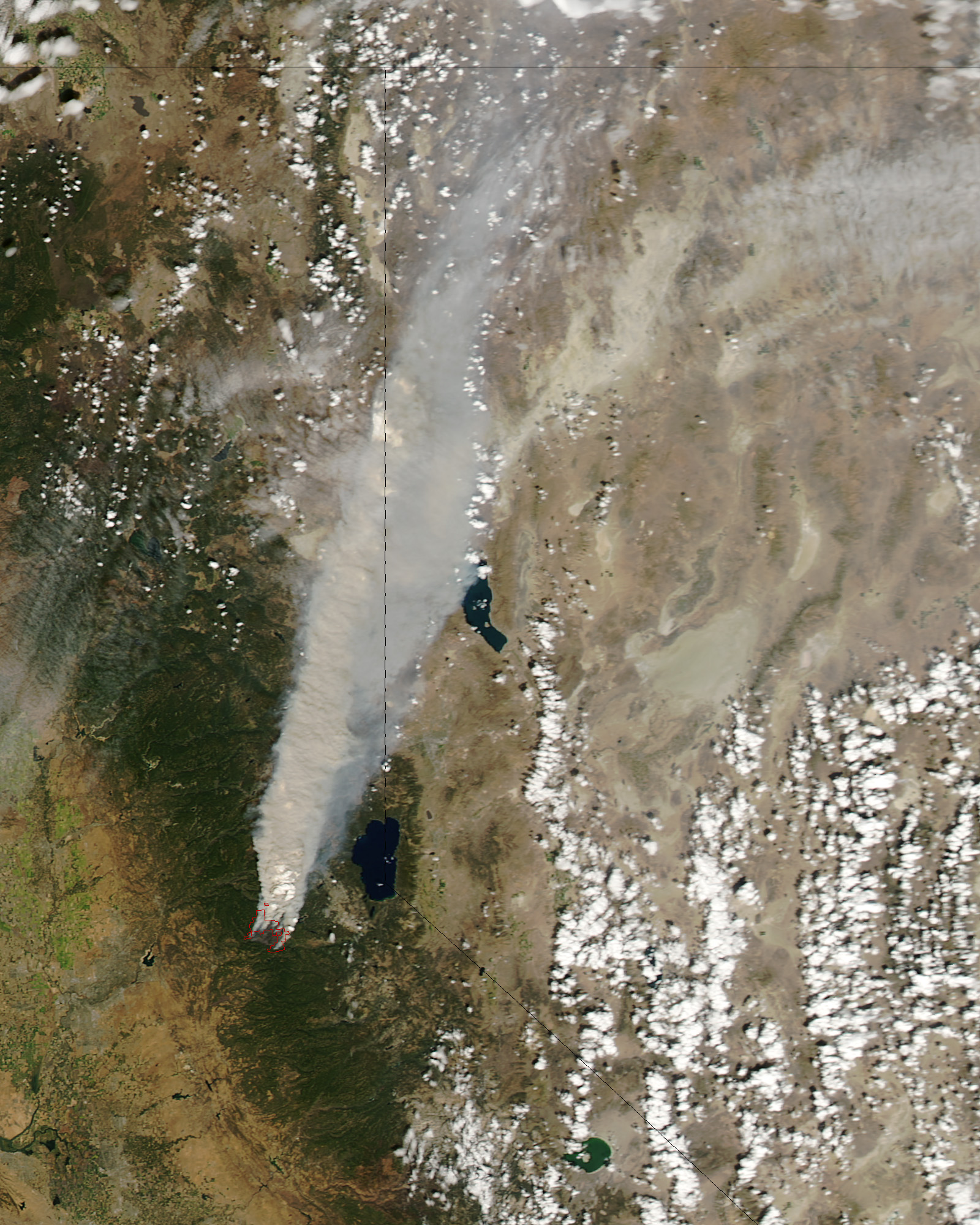
The King Fire as captured by NASA’s Aqua satellite on September 17

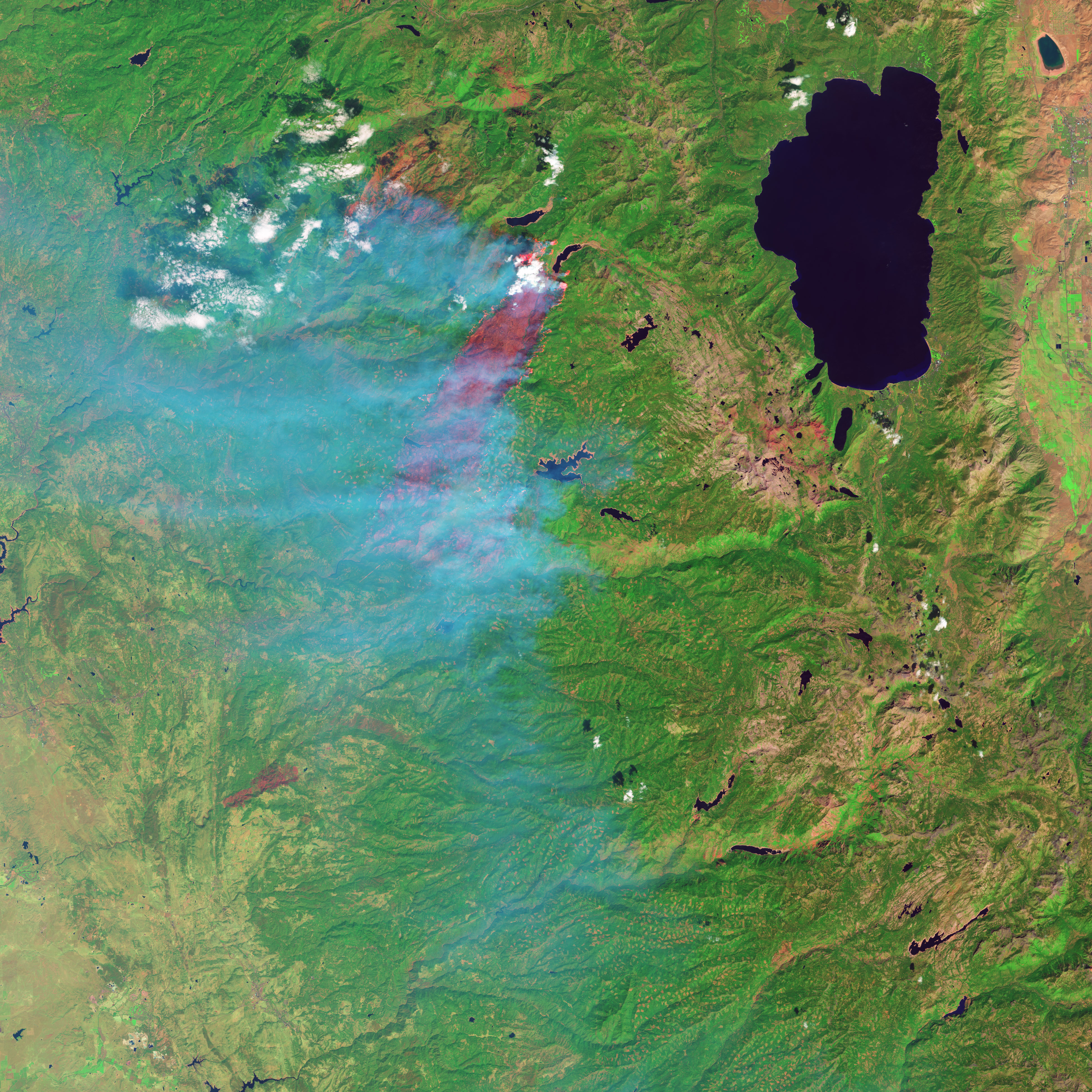
The King Fire as captured by NASA’s Landsat 8 satellite on September 19: "In the false-color image, burned forest appears red; unaffected forests are green; cleared forest is beige; and smoke is blue"

== See also ==
- 2014 California wildfires
- Caldor Fire
- Mosquito Fire
