= Fountain Fire =

1992 wildfire in Northern California

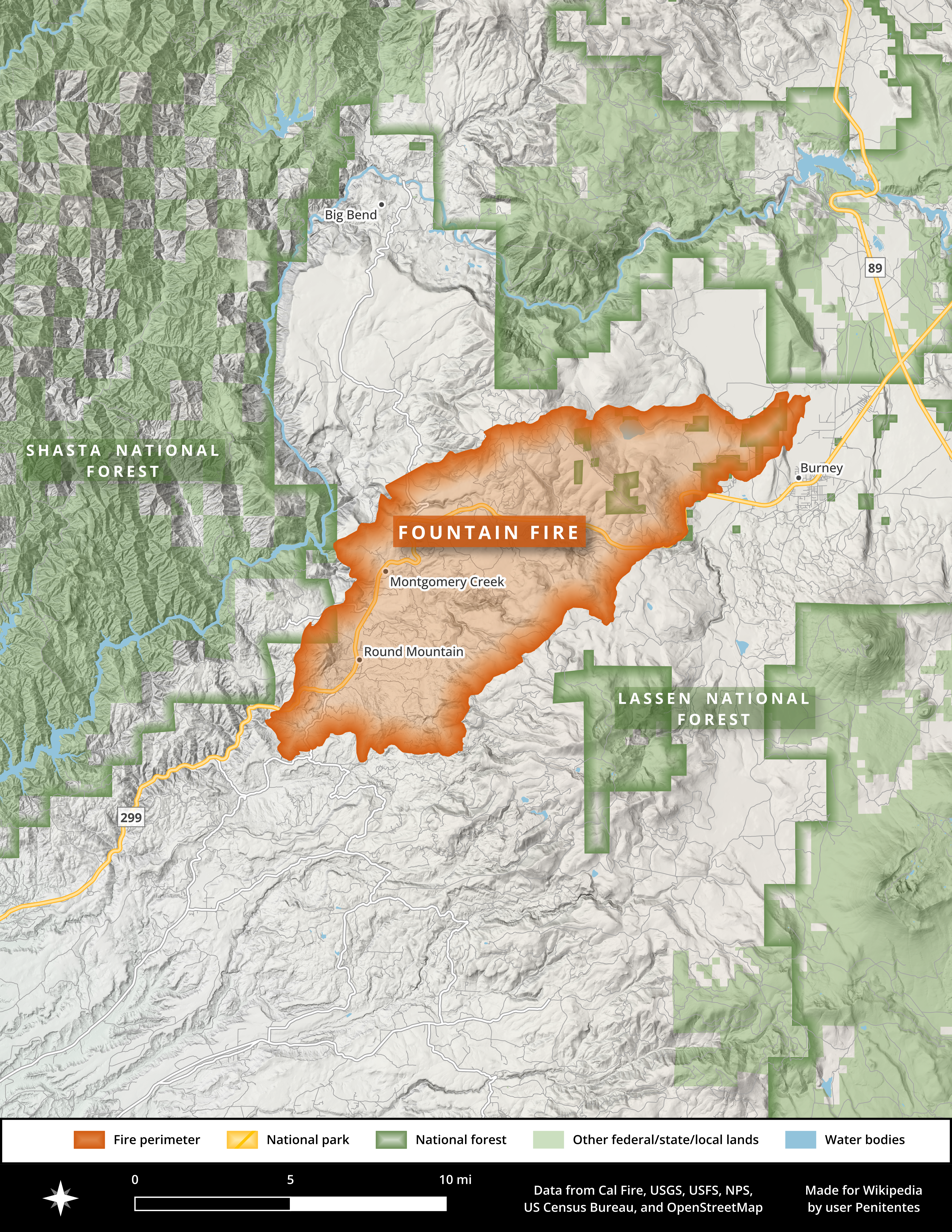
- A map of the Fountain Fire's final footprint
- Date: August 20 –; August 28, 1992; (9 days)
- Location: Shasta County, Northern California, United States
- Coordinates: 40.756°N 121.969°W

Statistics
- Burned area: 63,960 acres (25,884 ha; 100 sq mi; 259 km^{2})
- Land use: Private timberland

Impacts
- Deaths: 0
- Injuries: ≥11
- Evacuated: 7,500
- Structures destroyed: 636 (330 residential)
- Cost: ~$127.6 million; (equivalent to about $255.4 million in 2024)

Ignition
- Cause: Probable arson

Map
- Location of the Fountain Fire in Northern California

The Fountain Fire was a large and destructive wildfire in Shasta County, California, United States, in 1992. The fire ignited on August 20 in an act of probable but unattributed arson, and was quickly driven northeast by strong winds. It outpaced firefighters for two days, exhibiting extreme behavior such as long-range spot fires, crown fire runs, and pyrocumulonimbus clouds with dry lightning. The fire was contained after burning for nine days, though work to strengthen and repair fire lines continued for more than two months.

The Fountain Fire burned a total of 63,960 acres (25,880 ha) and destroyed hundreds of homes, primarily in Round Mountain and Montgomery Creek along the State Route 299 corridor. In 1992, it was the third most destructive wildfire in California's recorded history, though it no longer features among the 20 most destructive California wildfires. At a suppression cost of more than $22 million (about $44 million in 2024), it was also for a time the most expensive fire to contain in state history.

The Fountain Fire was recognized contemporarily as not just a major disaster but a "fire of the future". The devastation the fire left behind after moving through private timberlands interspersed with rural communities made it emblematic of the challenges residents and firefighting personnel face in the modern wildland–urban interface. The Fountain Fire was surpassed by later California wildfires in metrics for losses, but remains notable for its speed, its widespread destruction in multiple communities, and the long-term alteration of the landscape within its footprint.

== Background ==
The Fountain Fire burned in eastern Shasta County, part of the southern extent of the Cascade Range. The area was a secondary forest, having entirely regrown after logging between 1886 and 1923. The forest contained mixed conifers, comprising incense cedar, Douglas fir, sugar pine, and ponderosa pine, among other species. Sixty-five percent of the forest that the Fountain Fire burned was owned and managed by timber companies, including Roseburg Forest Products, Sierra Pacific Industries, and Fruit Growers Supply. Only one percent of the forest was owned by the state or the federal government; the other 34 percent belonged to smaller private landowners.

=== Climate and weather ===
Both long-term climatic patterns and short-term weather conditions helped create an environment conducive to a large and uncontrollable wildfire in late August 1992. Between 1987 and 1992, California experienced drought of a duration and severity not seen in the state since the 1920s and 1930s. Four of these six years ranked in the driest 10 percent of years by runoff. The stress on forests led to widespread bark beetle infestation.

Several weeks of high temperatures—equal to or exceeding 100 °F (38 °C) for 22 days—preceded the fire in Shasta County. There were also fewer firefighting personnel and equipment available than normal due to an already-active fire season in California; on the Fountain Fire's first day 4,000 firefighters were already staffing the destructive Old Gulch Fire in Calaveras County.

Lastly, a critical fire weather pattern developed in Northern California. The influence of an upper-level trough moving onshore in the Pacific Northwest and a strong upper-level jet situated over Northern California created strong flow out of the southwest and Foehn winds on the eastern slopes of the Cascade Range and the Sierra Nevada. Those winds also brought dry air courtesy of the dry slot, a feature often accompanying low-pressure systems. The Northern California Geographical Coordination Center identifies this as a typical critical fire weather setup in northeastern California and the southern Cascades: "Pre-frontal conditions occur when strong, southwesterly or westerly winds are generated by the dry, southern tail of a rapidly moving cold front." In the Fountain Fire's vicinity on August 20, southwest winds were blowing at up to 25 miles per hour (40 km/h).

== Progression ==
=== August 20 ===
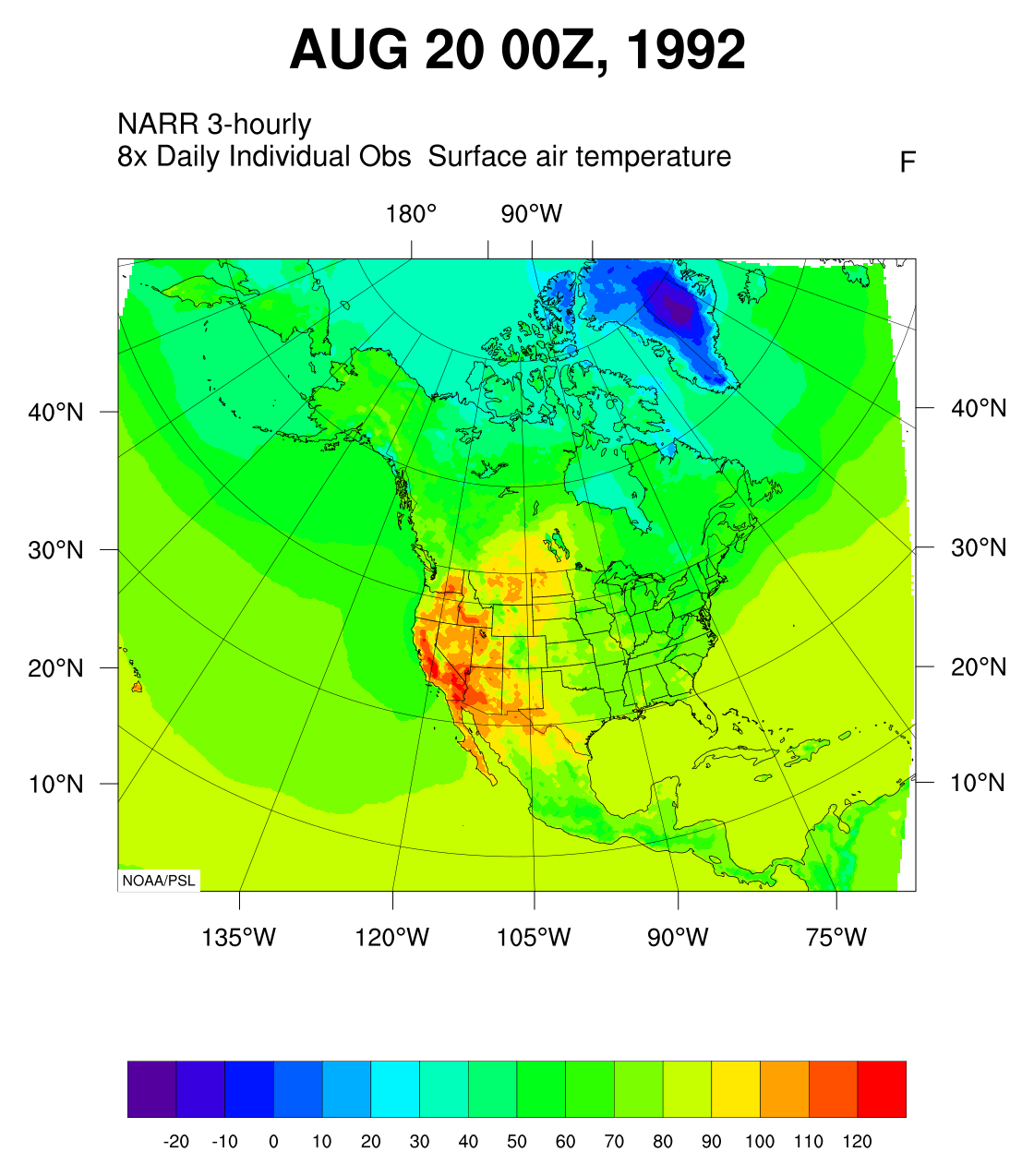
A map of air temperatures in °F at 5:00 p.m. PDT on August 20, the first day of the Fountain Fire, shows high temperatures across California

The Fountain Fire was first spotted by a fire lookout atop Hogback Mountain in the Shasta-Trinity National Forest at about 12:50 p.m. PDT on August 20. The lookout reported a smoke column behind a ridge, near a historic drinking fountain along Highway 299 (which gave the incident its name). They could not see the actual ignition point of the growing fire, which was confirmed by the Shasta Bear Mountain lookout's cross-check to be about two miles (3.2 km) from the fountain in dry grass off of Buzzard Roost Road, just west of Phillips Road and south of Highway 299. When a resident of Phillips Road spotted the fire shortly before 1:00 p.m., it was already 30 feet (9.1 m) across and it had climbed into the timber overstory.

The California Department of Forestry and Fire Protection (then CDF, now Cal Fire) dispatched numerous resources over the next 10 minutes; an observation aircraft arrived overhead by 1:07 p.m., reporting that the fire had already spread to 2–3 acres (0.8–1 ha) and was moving north quickly. Ground personnel arrived at 1:19 p.m., 29 minutes after the first report. The first two fire engines on the scene were forced to defend an under-construction house that was at risk from blowing embers. Firefighters saved multiple homes during this early stage of the fire, but it still grew rapidly. By 2:17 p.m. the Fountain Fire had burned 40–50 acres (16–20 ha) in its first 90 minutes, and CDF officials later marked this as the point where the fire exceeded the ability of the resources on scene to control it. By 2:50 p.m. these resources included 25 fire engines, ten air tankers, and three helicopters. At around 3:30 p.m., per a Roseburg Forest Industries brochure, fire activity intensified still further.

Officials initially hoped to hold the fire at Highway 299 outside of Round Mountain, keeping it under 200 acres (81 ha). They were nearly successful, but the high winds drove the fire into brush beneath power lines, which arced, starting multiple spot fires. Firefighters were unable to keep the Fountain Fire from continuing towards the community of Round Mountain. Round Mountain, Montgomery Creek, and the small subdivision of Moose Camp were all evacuated around 4:00 p.m. By 4:30 p.m., the fire had crossed Highway 299. This was also the approximate time that a new wildfire, the Barker Fire, began in Trinity County and further stretched firefighting resources in Northern California.

The Fountain Fire's northeastern push developed into an intense crown fire, with flame lengths of 300 feet (91 m) that kept ground crews from safely engaging. The wind helped embers ignite spot fires at least one mile (1.6 km) ahead of the main fire. The pyrocumulonimbus plume generated by the Fountain Fire reached at least 25,000 feet (7,600 m) in altitude, as detected by weather radar in Medford, Oregon, and generated numerous lightning strikes. The 50-to-70-mile-per-hour (80 to 113 km/h) jet stream blowing out of the west created a chimney effect when it met the billowing smoke plume, ventilating the fire and increasing fire behavior.

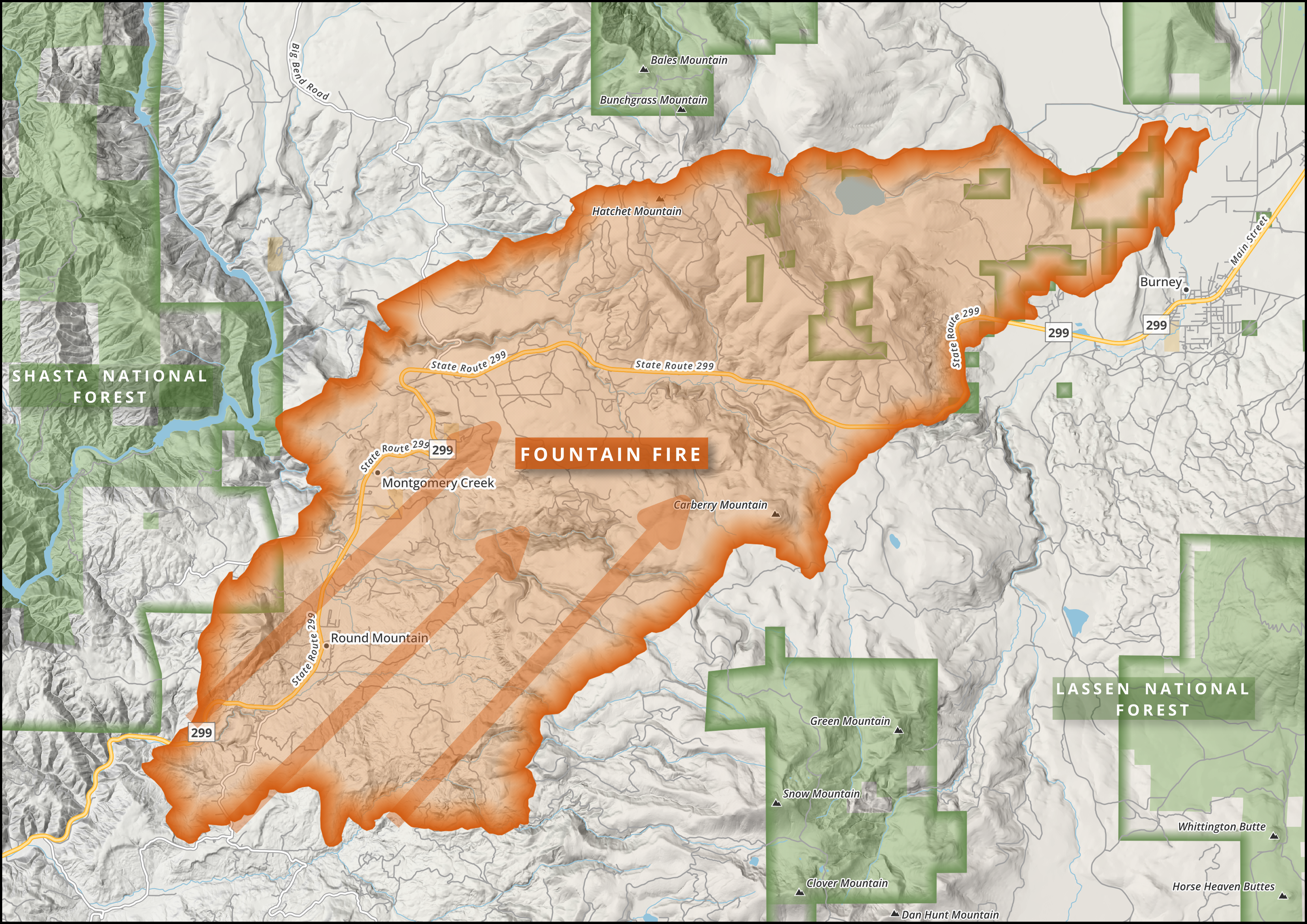
A closer view of the fire's footprint and the Highway 299 corridor

A Forest Service meteorologist speculated that, based on witness reports and debris, intense fire-generated vortices developed in the Fountain Fire. A National Weather Service meteorologist in Redding assigned to the incident concurred, noting that investigators found pine trees two to three feet (0.61 to 0.91 m) in diameter snapped in half by possible "fire tornadoes". Such vortices have been recorded in other Northern California wildfires, including the 2014 Eiler Fire near Hat Creek and the 2018 Carr Fire on the outskirts of the city of Redding.

As the fire swept through the community of Round Mountain, it burned at temperatures of up to 2,000 °F (1,090 °C), melting a cast-iron bathtub, stainless steel knives, chrome car bumpers, glass bottles, and even cooking potatoes growing underground. No one was killed or severely injured when the fire front pushed through the town, though multiple people drove out through the flames or left their properties just before the fire reached them.

By 5:00 p.m., fifteen people were trapped in an 80-acre (32 ha) meadow at the end of Frisby Road after flames blocked the way out to Highway 299. The McMillan family, ranchers and owners of the meadow property, had planned to go there in case of a fire and were able to wet the area down with water trucks and flood it by blocking irrigation ditches. The group remained there as the fire moved through with 200-foot (61 m) flame lengths, blowing the roofs off of nearby barns with the force of its passage. Two men put out spot fires with a bulldozer. A helicopter looking for people who had not evacuated eventually discovered the group, surrounded by flames. It was able to land and extricate two women and a two-year-old child, but could not return. Firefighters could not safely reach the remaining people and evacuate them until 10:00 p.m., five hours after they had taken refuge in the meadow.

Meanwhile, the fire continued moving north and east: by midnight, the fire had pushed further along the Highway 299 corridor and was south of Montgomery Creek. By then it had burned approximately 12,000 acres (4,900 ha) and forced 1,000–2,000 people to evacuate.

=== August 21 ===
The following day marked the single largest day of growth for the Fountain Fire as similar weather conditions continued to fuel extreme fire behavior. At one point the fire burned 80 acres (32 ha) every minute and spread at a rate of six miles per hour (9.7 km/h). This growth was enabled by more long-range spotting, as wind-borne embers started spot fires between one-quarter mile (0.40 km) and two miles (3.2 km) ahead of the main body of the fire.

In the morning, fire crews focused on protecting Montgomery Creek by attempting to stop one branch of the fire's advance at Fenders Ferry Road off of Highway 299, south of the community and north of Round Mountain. While firefighters were able to protect many structures along the road, they were unable to prevent the winds (a combination of continuing gusts from the southwest and inflow winds towards the Fountain Fire's massive plume to the east) from pushing the flames across the road. This happened shortly after noon, and the fire then pressed towards Montgomery Creek. The fire entered the center of the community along Highway 299 by 3:00 p.m. Multiple homes were destroyed, but firefighters protected the local school, post office, and other major structures with assistance from aircraft.

Meanwhile, the larger head of the fire to the east kept advancing, forcing the communities of Big Bend, Hillcrest, and Moose Camp to evacuate. The fire burned through Moose Camp—a community of 60 summer cabins and several permanent homes—later that day, leaving about 20 cabins standing. By 6:00 p.m. on August 21, the larger town of Burney was placed under a voluntary evacuation advisory. California Highway Patrol officers used bullhorns to warn residents of the danger, and the Red Cross shelter that had been established there was also forced to move.

The fire moved so quickly and fiercely that firefighters did not expect to be able to stop it short of where the conifer forests gave way to old lava beds east of Burney. By dusk, the fire had advanced all the way to Hatchet Mountain and Hatchet Mountain Pass, damaging radio equipment on the mountain's summit. Flames were visible from Burney. By 10:00 p.m., the fire front was within 1.5 miles (2.4 km) of the town, and had set a log deck on fire at Sierra Pacific Industries' mill on its western outskirts. However, once the Fountain Fire crested the hills west of Burney, it was no longer in alignment with the wind and upslope terrain that had driven it along the Highway 299 corridor for the last 36 hours. By midnight, the fire had burned more than 35,000 acres (14,000 ha) in total.

=== August 22 onwards ===
The Fountain Fire's behavior and growth over its first two days were sobering to firefighters. On August 22, the third day of the fire, Cal Fire deputy incident commander Bill Clayton predicted that the fire would grow to 100,000 acres (40,000 ha). A memo posted for crews read: "The fire has moved 7 miles in 6.5 hours the first day, faster the second day (Friday). Prepare for more of the same today. It is critically dry, fueled with variable winds, has produced rapid fire runs and heavy spotting which have ran out [sic] crews many times."

However, August 22 ended up bringing much more moderate weather conditions and fire behavior. Cooler temperatures and lighter winds allowed firefighters to gain ground. That morning, firefighters lit backfires off Highway 299 near Hatchet Mountain to prepare and strengthen control lines. This tactic was repeated in the afternoon as the fire closed to within one mile (1.6 km) of Burney. By the end of the day, it was clear that the head of the fire was progressing to the northeast of Burney and not towards it, and the Forest Service was calling the fire 30 percent contained.

During the 22nd and 23rd, the flanks of the fire remained problematic: the fire moved both northeast towards the Pit River and southwest towards Oak Run and other communities. Stopping the Fountain Fire from crossing the Pit River was a high priority, as officials cited the steepness of the terrain beyond it, dense fuels, and the high resource values (such as old-growth forests and endangered spotted owl habitat) that would be at risk if it crossed. In that case, officials feared a "whole new ball game" with "uncontrollable" fire conditions. Crews were aided on that side by strong winds from the north, though the same winds made containing the southern flank more difficult. Residents of Round Mountain and Montgomery Creek were briefly allowed to return to their properties.

Before dawn on August 24, low humidity and winds of up to 25 miles per hour (40 km/h) prompted a red flag warning for much of Northern California and also caused the fire to briefly become more active, jumping the fire line into the drainage of Cow Creek. Some evacuation orders were re-issued, including for Oak Run and Mill Creek, but the fire did not burn any more structures and by that afternoon it was 40 percent contained in all.

The winds failed to re-materialize on the 25th, though the weather remained hot and dry. Firefighters constructed firebreaks by hand in the Pit River canyon, in terrain so rugged that bulldozers could not operate and described by a Shasta-Trinity National Forest spokesperson as "steeper than a cow's face." Big Bend, Moose Camp, and Hillcrest alone remained under mandatory evacuation orders. Firefighter reported re-burning and flare-ups of activity near unburned islands (ranging from 30–400 acres (12–162 ha)) of vegetation and structures within the fire. By midday on August 26 the fire was 75 percent contained. On August 27 it remained hot and dry but with calm winds.

On August 28, the Fountain Fire was declared 100 percent contained, having burned a total area just shy of 64,000 acres (26,000 ha). Firefighters continued to monitor 12,000 acres (4,900 ha) of unburned vegetation within the perimeter that risked reigniting, primarily on Hatchet Mountain and Lookout Mountain. The fire was officially declared controlled on November 1. (Note: 'Containment' and 'control' of a wildfire are technical terms used by the California Department of Forestry and Fire Protection (Cal Fire). A wildfire is contained when it is completely encircled by control lines (including fire breaks, burned-out areas, and natural features). A wildfire is controlled when it is contained and has been extinguished such that it no longer threatens to spread any further.) Other fire suppression operations continued until mid-November.

== Firefighting effort ==
A deadlock between the Democratic state legislature and the Republican governor Pete Wilson meant that California was without a budget between July 1 and September 3, 1992, and was forced to pay many state employees or contractors in official IOUs during that period. These included CDF firefighters on the Fountain Fire, many of whom bought and wore T-shirts that displayed the names of major fires, a "beleaguered firefighter", and the words "All this for an IOU?"

On August 23 the Fountain Fire was reported to be short of 105 wildland firefighters (equivalent to seven handcrews) primarily because of resources taken up by the Old Gulch Fire in Calaveras County. There were also fewer replacements in part because the budget stalemate meant that fire departments throughout the state were in some cases unwilling to send their idle units, worried about potential budget cuts and the need to maintain their own operations in the face of uncertain funding and reimbursement.

At the peak of the suppression effort, around 4,464 personnel—of whom at least 600 were California Conservation Camp Program prison inmates paid one dollar per day—worked to fight the fire. Firefighters worked shifts as long as 24 hours. The Shasta County fairgrounds in the town of Anderson, south of Redding, served as the main base camp for firefighters. On Sunday, August 23 alone, air tankers dropped 212,000 gallons of fire retardant, a then-record for the Forest Service air attack base in Redding. Aircraft, including Grumman S2Fs and Lockheed P-3 Orions, dropped over 740,000 gallons of fire retardant in total and were joined by at least 15 water-dropping helicopters and more than 470 ground vehicles. A Cal Fire official described the air attack fleet as "larger than the Peruvian Air Force." When suppression was complete the Fountain Fire had become the then-most expensive wildfire to contain in recorded California history, at a total cost of more than $22 million (equivalent to about $44 million in 2024).

=== Criticism and response ===
Many residents who lost their homes in the Fountain Fire afterwards expressed criticisms of the firefighting effort. They argued that the firefighters should have cut more and larger fire lines between the flames and Montgomery Creek, and that crews did not defend structures that could have been saved. They also contended that many resources stood idle without orders for too long before engaging the fire or refused to engage at all. Multiple residents believed their homes were destroyed in backfires set by firefighters to slow the main fire. A Cal Fire battalion chief was assaulted during the fire by a man who reportedly disagreed with the way it was being fought. In November, more than 200 residents attended a meeting to air their disagreements over Cal Fire's efforts. Representatives for area politicians, including for U.S. House Representative Wally Herger, attended.

Fire officials pushed back on these criticisms, asserting primarily that fire behavior was so intense that losses were unavoidable: many structures lay at the end of long driveways adjacent to heavy vegetation and could not have been safely protected. They also argued that without the context of internal communications, firefighters running out of water and leaving to get more was likely misinterpreted as abandonment of structure defense efforts. Finally, they pointed to at least 228 buildings that had been saved as evidence of their success in the face of the adverse conditions. One firefighter noted the challenges posed by the Fountain Fire burning largely in privately owned forests: firefighters could have built fire lines and conduct firing operations wherever they chose in national forests, but not on land under private ownership and with power lines.

The Rural Fire Protection in America Steering Committee interviewed fire officials, though not local residents, and produced a report analyzing CDF's initial mobilization for the Fountain Fire. The report was favorable to the agency, though it noted that during the fire's early stages radio frequencies were overloaded and firefighters generally lacked good information on which homes were or were not defensible.

In March 1993, about 400 people attended a hearing on the fire held in Redding by the California State Senate Committee for Natural Resources and Wildlife. In the same month, Cal Fire also released its own internal report on the Fountain Fire. Issued by a four-member committee of Northern California fire chiefs and officers, it relied on interviews with 24 different fire officials (but no victims). The Cal Fire report was again mostly favorable to the agency, but listed several areas for improvement. It concluded that during the first 48 hours of the fire there were too few managers for the amount of equipment (the result of budget reductions and fires elsewhere), as well as serious communications issues. During the fire, 72 amateur ham radio operators had coordinated closely with Cal Fire and other agencies in the absence of telephone access. The report also criticized private firefighting equipment operators who showed up to the fire in hopes of being hired on the spot, causing confusion among officials who did not want responsibility for the potentially unqualified operators. On the other hand, the committee report noted that 60 percent of the homes in the area of the Fountain Fire fell short of state standards for wildfire safety, including construction, brush clearance, and water access. The fire could not have been stopped given the windy conditions, most of the homes destroyed were indefensible, and the area was "a disaster waiting to happen", the report concluded.

=== State audit ===
In 1994, Cal Fire Director Richard A. Wilson ordered a series of audits of the agency's spending on wildfires, prompted by that year's expensive fire season. The first audit focused on the Fountain Fire. Some news articles seized on purchases made during the fire deemed extravagant, such as an order for more than 1,800 pounds (820 kg) of honey, as well as large bills for coffee, hotel rooms for firefighters, paperwork, and other goods and services. More systematically, the audit criticized the use of large and expensive helicopters and air tankers, and the disparity in compensation between very low-paid inmate firefighters (who did much of the difficult and dangerous physical labor on the fire line) and their correctional officers/supervisors.

== Cause ==
Investigators pinpointed the precise spot where the fire started, using forensic techniques that even included examining the "pattern of charring on cow patties". They used satellite data to confirm that there had been no recent lightning strikes nearby, and traffic patterns to rule out a sparks from a vehicle's exhaust or a hot catalytic converter. No downed power lines were found at the site; nor indeed was any sign of an ignition source found at the fire's origin, such as matches, cigarette butts, or a "trace of exhaust carbon from machinery".

These methods led investigators to announce on August 25 that the cause of the Fountain Fire was probable arson. A Cal Fire spokesperson declared that "the probability is that someone used a match or cigarette lighter to ignite the fire and took it with them." Secret Witness, a non-profit organization, offered a $10,000 reward for information leading to the arrest and conviction of the responsible party. Cal Fire investigators followed about 50 leads, with none leading to an arrest. The statute of limitations for prosecuting the presumed act of arson expired three years later in 1995, though Cal Fire said then that it would continue investigating, with a spokesperson noting that "If a person has ignited one fire, they may have lit them before or they may light them later." A new California arson statute with harsher penalties and a longer statute of limitations was enacted in 1994 but did not apply retroactively.

No precise motive or perpetrator was ever determined, though one federal prosecutor told The Sacramento Bee in 1994 that he believed it was economic arson committed by someone intending to make money from the fire suppression effort. This was a motive linked to several other fires in Northern California at the time, some of which resulted in indictments.

== Effects ==
=== Casualties ===
No deaths were directly caused by the fire. However, three loggers—Melvin Bentley, Donald Hendrickson, and Steve Horton Tyler—were killed in separate incidents during salvage logging operations in the burn area; they are commemorated on a Fountain Fire historical marker. On October 15, Bentley was killed when he was struck by a partially burned limb that fell from a tree as he took a break beneath it. On November 2, Hendrickson, a skidder operator, was hit by a falling snag and died after being airlifted to a Redding hospital. Tyler died almost a year later, on July 15, 1993, after being run over by a tractor he was operating. At least two other workers were seriously injured during Fountain Fire salvage logging, both of them struck in the head by trees that snapped back after being pinned down by other falling trees.

There were also at least 11 firefighter injuries during the fire itself. One firefighter was struck by a falling branch, and another broke an ankle. At least three state prison inmates were also injured, including one who suffered a broken leg. One firefighter was forced to deploy their fire shelter when overcome by flames while trying to protect a house. There were also substantial livestock losses, with entire herds of swine and cattle killed.

=== Closures and evacuations ===
The fire caused Highway 299 to close from Oak Run in the west to Four Corners in the east, and Highway 89 to close from Highway 44 in the south to Interstate 5 in the north. Highway 299 reopened on August 29, following the removal of hazardous trees and the replacement of around 300 burned guard rail posts. McArthur-Burney Falls Memorial State Park, home to Burney Falls, was closed when the evacuation warning for Burney was issued and thereafter used as a camp for firefighters. In total, about 7,500 people were forced to evacuate because of the Fountain Fire. The majority of these evacuees were able to return to their homes on August 22, leaving 2,000to 3,000 people still displaced from Moose Camp, Montgomery Creek, Hillcrest, and Round Mountain. Some residents of burned areas were able to access their properties on August 23 and 24. By August 25, Big Bend, Moose Camp, and Hillcrest were the only communities still under mandatory evacuation orders, and almost all evacuees were able to return by August 28. Two Shasta County residents were convicted of burglary for looting an evacuated home in Oak Run.

=== Damage ===
The Fountain Fire destroyed 636 structures. Homes accounted for 330 of them, the remainder being commercial structures or outbuildings such as barns or sheds. Another 78 homes were damaged. The fire burned part of the elementary school in Round Mountain, including its auditorium and library. The Hill Country Community Clinic also burned down, leaving the nearest physician 30 miles away in Redding. The California Office of Emergency Services preliminarily estimated the cost of the Fountain Fire's damage to private property at $105.6 million (equivalent to about $211.3 million in 2024). This estimate, made the day the fire was contained, included almost $18 million in residential losses, almost $2 million in commercial losses, and $86 million in timber losses. At the time, the Fountain Fire was the third most destructive wildfire in recorded California history (after the Oakland firestorm of 1991 and the 1990 Painted Cave Fire in Santa Barbara), though it no longer ranks among the top 20 most destructive California wildfires.

The communities affected were economically vulnerable before the fire; as much as 90 percent of the populations of Round Mountain, Montgomery Creek, and nearby areas relied on some sort of public assistance. Jobs were often seasonal or dependent on tourism. The Red Cross estimated that 3/4ths of all those who lost their homes in the fire lacked insurance.

The fire also damaged much of rural Shasta County's basic infrastructure. All of eastern Shasta County lost power when the Fountain Fire burned the Cedar Creek PG&E substation in Round Mountain. More than 150,000 feet (46,000 m) of telephone cable operated by Citizens Utilities was burned. Pacific Gas and Electric Company (PG&E) was forced to replace 45,000 feet (14,000 m) feet of electrical distribution lines, repair 150 miles (240 km) of transmission lines, and replace approximately 300 wooden power line poles that had burned.

At the time, fire officials highlighted the Fountain Fire as a "fire of the future", connecting the destruction of the wildfire to California's growing population, particularly in the wildland-urban interface. A CDF spokesperson called fires like it "the price we pay for living where we choose to live". By 1992, more than 1,000 building permits were being issued every year outside of cities and towns in Shasta County. Firefighters recalled the first two fire engines on the scene being forced to defend a structure in the path of the Fountain Fire instead of suppressing the fire directly, and emphasized the lack of sufficient vegetation clearance around most structures.

An article ran in the Paradise Post two weeks after the Fountain Fire, noting that the city of Paradise, California was susceptible to a similar wildfire, with its comparable geography, fuels, and climate. In 2018 most of Paradise burned to the ground in an urban firestorm when the wind-driven Camp Fire blew through, killing 85 people and destroying more than 18,000 structures to become California's deadliest and most destructive wildfire.

=== Environmental impacts ===
The smoke plume from the Fountain Fire gradually drifted southwest over the Bay Area and California coast, including Sonoma, Mendocino, Lake, and Napa counties; it prompted hundreds of calls to fire departments in Santa Cruz, Scotts Valley, and elsewhere on August 22 and 23 from people who thought the smoke came from a local fire.

Various local flora and fauna were threatened by the fire. The fire approached critical habitats for the endangered and protected northern spotted owl and California spotted owl. The fire also threatened the only known populations of the Shasta snow-wreath, a rare deciduous shrub only recognized as an undiscovered species by botanists in May 1992, just months before the Fountain Fire—but the plants survived. A biologist for the California Department of Fish and Game predicted potential major impacts on local fish populations.

In a report for the Forest Foundation that advocated for thinning forests and post-fire replanting, retired forestry professor Thomas Bonnicksen used a Forest Carbons and Emissions Model (FCEM) to calculate that more than 13 million tons of carbon dioxide were released through combustion and decay in the Fountain Fire—equivalent to more than 17 percent of annual passenger vehicle emissions in California in 2005. However, the report received pushback: it was never peer-reviewed, and California Air Resources Board and Forest Service officials critiqued it as probably overestimating the amount of emissions. Other critics noted Bonnicksen's alignment with the timber industry.

=== Political response ===
Shasta County Sheriff Jim Pope declared a local emergency on August 21, the day after the fire had begun and burned through Round Mountain. On the same day, Governor Wilson declared a state of emergency in Shasta County. On August 22, U.S. House Representative Wally Herger toured the disaster area and called for a federal disaster declaration from President George H. W. Bush. President Bush then authorized federal relief for Shasta County on August 29. Shasta County and the Federal Emergency Management Agency (FEMA) agreed to drop all fees for fire victims seeking to rebuild their homes, and FEMA funded an additional building inspector for rebuilding efforts in the fire area for 18 months. Democratic Party U.S. Senate candidate Dianne Feinstein visited Redding on September 1 for her campaign, receiving a briefing at the incident command post in Anderson and a tour of the fire's footprint via helicopter.

== Post-fire landscape ==
A 1992 false-color Landsat/USGS image shows part of Northern California, with the burn scar visible in the upper right-hand corner

Before the Fountain Fire the predominant forest cover type in the area was Sierra Nevada mixed conifer, with Pacific Ponderosa pine cover at lower elevations. Tree species included ponderosa pine, sugar pine, Douglas fir, white fir, incense cedar, and California black oak, while the understory was dominated by manzanita and Ceanothus species. The fire largely burned at a high severity, and killed much of the vegetation within its footprint.

In the weeks after the fire, Cal Fire conducted reseeding operations via helicopter, spreading 42 tons of native grass seeds over more than 5,000 acres (2,000 ha) judged prone to erosion. Timber companies built stream buffers and check dams in vulnerable waterways. Erosion concerns were borne out when a large autumn storm at the end of October brought rockslides and debris down onto Highway 299 in the burn area, temporarily blocking it. The following spring, rain on the hydrophobic soil (ash leaving it unable to absorb water) carved deep gullies, carried off topsoil, and washed roads out across the county.

=== Salvage logging ===
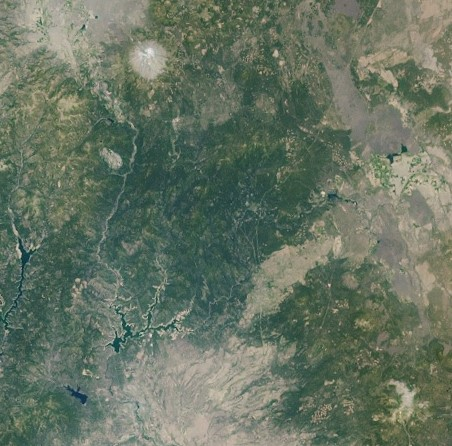
A NASA Terra satellite image from 2001 shows the salvage-logged burn scar from the Fountain Fire

The vast majority of the area burned by the Fountain Fire was privately owned. Of the nearly 64,000 acres (26,000 ha) burned, 41 percent (more than 25,000 acres (10,000 ha)) belonged to Roseburg Forest Products, 15 percent (more than 9,000 acres (3,600 ha)) to Sierra Pacific Industries, and nine percent to Fruit Growers Supply. Thirty-four percent belonged to small private landowners, and one percent belonged to the state or federal government. In total, 41,300 acres (16,700 ha) of the burn area were under industrial ownership.

California's Forest Practices Act permits timber companies to quickly harvest burned trees without first submitting thorough timber harvest plans to the state, in a practice called salvage logging. Salvage logging is an environmentally controversial but profitable enterprise for timber companies. After the Fountain Fire, Roseburg was able to keep multiple sawmills in Northern California open to process the salvaged wood, temporarily saving hundreds of jobs and prolonging the mills' lives by months when they had previously been slated to close over new environmental restrictions on logging public lands. By the end of the salvage logging effort in 1993, 600 million board feet of timber had been harvested from the burned trees, as well as 913,000 tons of wood chips for biomass power plant fuel.

In 1977, 10 families belonging to the Pit River Tribe of Native Americans had occupied Smith Camp (a defunct logging camp), claiming ancestral rights to the surrounding land. Roseburg Forest Products, which acquired the land in 1979 from another logging company, left the group undisturbed in the hopes that they would eventually leave. When the Fountain Fire burned through the area, it also destroyed the structures at Smith Camp, and Roseburg refused to authorize FEMA to place trailers there for the Native group to live in while they rebuilt. Roseburg also sought to conduct salvage logging operations on the land, and was resisted. The Native Americans demanded the legal title to the Smith Camp property, supported by the Pit River Tribal Council.

=== Herbicide application and replanting ===
Roseburg and the other timber companies sprayed the land slated for replanting with herbicides, such as hexazinone, intended to suppress brush growth that might compete with replanted conifer saplings. Local residents organized a rally at a creek in the proposed spraying area with more than 100 attendees, worried about potential environmental contamination and side effects from the herbicides. Company officials dismissed concerns, arguing that the chemicals were known to be safe.

Logging companies began to replant in the spring of 1993, about seven months after the fire, and those efforts continued for five years. Roseburg planted "a combination of ponderosa pine, Douglas-fir, and white fir with 10-foot spacing." The scale of the replanting was significant: Roseburg Forest Industries planted 10 million seedlings, Sierra Pacific Industries planted three million, and Fruit Growers Supply Co. and W.M. Beaty and Associates planted the remaining four million, for a total of 17 million seedlings replanted in the burn area. The replanted trees are estimated to reach maturity at 100 feet (30 m) in height by 2065, although the growing forest is less varied than the second-growth forest that burned in the fire.

=== Fountain Wind Project ===
Wildfire concerns in the Fountain Fire's footprint also helped sink a contentious large wind farm project proposed for timberland property west of Burney and north of Highway 299. Known as the Fountain Wind project and proposed by energy firm ConnectGEN LLC, the project would have included up to 71 wind turbines, 679 feet (207 m) tall, with the capacity to generate 216 megawatts of electricity. The project's location within a high wildfire hazard zone, as evidenced by the Fountain Fire, was cited by opposing residents as a reason to deny approval to the project. They argued that the turbines could ignite fires (either by malfunctioning or by attracting lightning), would require significant vegetation clearance, and would make aerial firefighting more difficult. Officials with the Fountain Wind project argued that it would serve as a large-scale fuel break between the communities along Highway 299. A report by Shasta County's fire chief noted that the turbines would present an obstacle to aerial firefighting operations, but would not totally prevent them. It also described the help that the access roads cleared of vegetation would provide to crews. In 2021, the Shasta County Planning Commission voted unanimously to reject the project's use permit, followed by an appeal to the Shasta County Board of Supervisors that was denied in a 4–1 vote. Wildfire risks and firefighting challenges were given as a primary reason for the rejection. The California Energy Commission also rejected the project on environmental grounds.

== See also ==
Other notable arson-caused and/or destructive wildfires in Shasta County:

- Ponderosa Fire (2012)
- Clover Fire (2013)
- Salt Fire (2021)
- Fawn Fire (2021)
