= The Land Report =

US magazine

- Cover of the Spring 2022 issue, featuring Taylor Sheridan
- Editor: Eric O'Keefe
- Categories: Newsmagazine
- Frequency: Quarterly
- Publisher: Eddie Lee Rider
- First issue: April 1, 2007
- Company: Land Report, LLC
- Country: US
- Based in: Dallas, Texas
- Language: English
- Website: www.landreport.com
- ISSN: 1943-9709

The Land Report is an American magazine and website that focuses on private landownership in the United States. It profiles leading landowners and compiles the Land Report 100, an annual ranking of America's largest landowners. The editorial staff also reports on topics such as significant properties, landmark transactions, market news, investing, property management, and conservation, as well as legislation and judicial decisions affecting landowners.

High-profile landowners who have been featured in the magazine include Drew Bledsoe, Tom Brokaw, Clint Eastwood, Red Emmerson, Bill Gates, Stan Kroenke, Joe Montana, Jake Paul, T. Boone Pickens, Nolan Ryan, Taylor Sheridan, Stefan Soloviev, and Ted Turner.

The Land Report also profiles well-known landmarks such as Hearst Ranch, Natural Bridge, King Ranch, the Waggoner Ranch, the 6666 Ranch, and Cabin Bluff Sporting Plantation, one of the nation's oldest hunt clubs.

== History ==
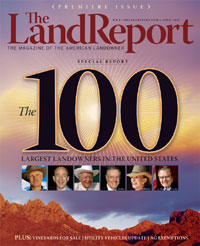
Cover of the first issue of The Land Report, April 1, 2007

Founded by Eric O'Keefe and Eddie Lee Rider Jr, The Land Report was first published in April 2007 and bills itself as "The Magazine of the American Landowner." Its premier issue included the inaugural Land Report 100 and was the subject of a feature article in The Wall Street Journal. Since its 2007 launch, O'Keefe has served as editor-in-chief and Rider the publisher.

== Land Report 100 ==
The Land Report 100 is an annual ranking of America's leading landowners and the magazine's signature study. It is regularly cited by U.S. and international media in articles that cover leading American landowners. The inaugural Land Report 100 was published in April 2007. More recently, the Land Report 100 has been published in the magazine's winter issue.

In the 2020 Land Report 100, Eric O’Keefe broke the story of Bill Gates's ownership of 242,000 acres of farmland, an amount that ranked first in the United States among private landowners. Overall, Gates ranked No. 43 on the 2025 Land Report 100.

The 2026 Land Report 100 broke the news that Stan Kroenke is America’s largest private landowner with 2.7 million acres. Kroenke is followed by the Emmersons, owners of Sierra Pacific Industries with 2.44 million acres of timberland, John Malone with 2.2 million acres, and Ted Turner with 2 million acres.

== Deals of the Year ==
Each year in its spring issue, The Land Report recognizes a single landmark transaction as the Land Report Deal of the Year. Additional transactions highlighting farmland, ranchland, timberland, and other land types are also featured. Examples of Deals of the Year include Florida's Bluffs of Saint Teresa, Utah's Wasatch Peak Ranch, California's Dangermond Preserve, and Texas's Waggoner Ranch.

== Best Brokerages ==
The Land Report annually surveys US land brokerages to ascertain the total value of self-reported domestic land sales through traditional brokerage. The totals exclude commercial, industrial, and residential assets, unless those assets were a component of a more valuable land asset. The magazine’s Top Auction Houses survey, which also runs annually in the spring issue, features summaries of the total value of self-reported domestic land sales by leading US auction houses.
