= The Cup (book) =

2009 book by Eric O'Keefe

- Author: Eric O'Keefe
- Genre: Non-fiction
- Publisher: Slattery Media (Australia)
- Publication date: 2009
- Media type: Print (Paperback)
- Pages: 254
- ISBN: 978-0-9804420-1-4
- Dewey Decimal: 823.4

The Cup is a non-fiction book written by American author Eric O'Keefe. First published in Australia in 2009, its subject is the 2002 running of the Melbourne Cup, which was won by the American-bred gelding Media Puzzle, who was ridden by champion Australian jockey Damien Oliver and prepared by the Irish trainer Dermot Weld. The Cup was based on a 2003 article that O’Keefe wrote for Nicklaus magazine titled "The Race That Stopped a Nation." O’Keefe and Australian director Simon Wincer co-authored the screenplay for the movie version of the story, which premiered in 2011 starring Brendan Gleeson.

== Plot summary ==
The week before the 2002 Melbourne Cup, Jason Oliver, Damien's older brother, was fatally injured in a training accident while riding an unraced horse at Belmont Racecourse in Perth. Taken to Royal Perth Hospital, Jason never regained consciousness and died after being taken off life support. This was when he was doubted as to whether he would ride Media Puzzle in the Melbourne Cup but of course he would do so wouldn't he.

In 1975, while competing in the Boulder Cup at Kalgoorlie, Ray Oliver, Damien and Jason's father, was involved in a five-horse fall. Knocked unconscious, the jockey was flown from Kalgoorlie to Perth where he too was treated at Royal Perth Hospital. Ray Oliver never regained consciousness and died. His death left his widow, Pat, to look after their two sons: Jason, 5, and Damien, 3.

Damien's decision to return to Melbourne following Jason's death and compete in the Melbourne Cup captured the attention of his fellow countrymen as well as racing enthusiasts around the world. He dedicated his victory in the 2002 Melbourne Cup to his brother. His winning ride has since been selected by Sport Australia Hall of Fame as one of the most memorable moments in the country's sporting history.

=== Foreword ===
Australian director Simon Wincer wrote the book's foreword.

=== Part one ===
The first six chapters of The Cup introduce the individuals and the events leading up to the 2002 Melbourne Cup, including background on Dermot Weld ("The Irish Wizard"), Sheikh Mohammed bin Rashid al Maktoum ("The Sheikh"), the race itself ("The Melbourne Cup"), legendary trainer Bart Cummings ("The Cups King"), Dermot Weld's historic victory in the 1993 Melbourne Cup ("A Vintage Performance"), and the internationalization of the Melbourne Cup ("The World Comes Calling").

=== Part two ===
The final ten chapters of The Cup focus on the 2002 racing season, including the decision to race Media Puzzle ("The Dark Horse"), Damien Oliver's background ("The West Australian"), the 2002 Geelong Cup ("A Theatrical Streak"), the great Australian Thoroughbred Northerly ("The Last Best Hope"), Jason Oliver's accident ("Racing Home"), Jason Oliver's death and its effects ("Solving the Puzzle"), Damien Oliver's winless effort on Victoria Derby Day ("Derby Day"), Melbourne Cup Day ("The Boys From the Bush"), the 2002 Melbourne Cup ("The Race That Stopped the Nation"), and the burial of Jason Oliver ("Final Ride").

=== Epilogue and appendices ===
A brief epilogue follows the principal characters since 2002. Appendices include the Final Field of the 2002 Melbourne Cup, Damien Oliver's 2002 Melbourne Cup Carnival Results, Melbourne Cup Statistics, and the Cast of Characters.

== Book launch ==
The launch of The Cup took place in the Committee Room at Flemington Racecourse on August 4, 2009. Race caller Bryan Martin emceed the event, which featured remarks by Damien Oliver and Simon Wincer. Eric O'Keefe spoke about his experiences researching and writing The Cup via commentary taped in Dallas.

== The film ==
Movie poster for The Cup

O’Keefe and Wincer co-wrote the screenplay for the 2011 film version of The Cup, and Wincer directed the $15 million feature film. Brendan Gleeson was cast as Dermot Weld. Stephen_Curry portrayed Damien Oliver, and Daniel MacPherson portrayed his brother, Jason Oliver. Jodi Gordon played Trish Oliver, and Alice Parkinson played Jason Oliver's girlfriend, Jenny. Bill Hunter, in his final film role, played Bart Cummings. Bruce Rowland composed the musical score. David Burr was the cinematographer, and Lisette Thomas production designer. Jan Bladier, Lance Hool, David Lee, and Wincer producer The Cup, and Kirk D’Amico, Peter DeRauch, Joel Pearlman, Greg Sitch, and James Vernon were executive producers. The review aggregator Rotten Tomatoes reports 28% of critics gave the film positive reviews based on 25 reviews. On Metacritic, the film has a weighted average score of 33 out of 100, based on 4 reviews.
