= Placerville Airport =

- IATA: PVF; ICAO: KPVF; FAA LID: PVF

Summary
- Airport type: Public
- Owner: El Dorado County
- Serves: Placerville, California
- Elevation AMSL: 2,585 ft / 788 m
- Coordinates: 38°43′27″N 120°45′12″W

Map

Runways
Direction	Length		Surface
Direction	ft	m	Surface
5/23	4,201	1,280	Asphalt

Helipads
Number	Length		Surface
Number	ft	m	Surface
H1	50	15	Concrete

Statistics (2010)
- Aircraft operations: 66,000
- Based aircraft: 138
- Source: Federal Aviation Administration

Placerville Airport (IATA: PVF, ICAO: KPVF, FAA LID: PVF) is three miles east of Placerville, in El Dorado County, California, United States. The National Plan of Integrated Airport Systems for 2011–2015 categorized it as a general aviation airport.

As of January 2024, there are no passenger airlines operating scheduled flights from or to the airport. From 1977 to 1978 California Air Commuter scheduled Piper Navajo flights to Placerville.

== Facilities ==
Placerville Airport covers 243 acres (98 ha) at an elevation of 2,585 feet (788 m). Its one runway, 5/23, is 4,201 by 75 feet (1,280 x 23 m). It has one helipad, H1, 50 by 50 feet (15 x 15 m).

In the year ending April 30, 2010 the airport had 66,000 aircraft operations, average 180 per day: 97% general aviation, 1.5% air taxi, and 1.5% military. 138 aircraft were then based at the airport: 96% single-engine, 2% multi-engine, 1% helicopter, and 1% ultralight.
