= Ember attack =

Type of fire

An ember attack is when, during a bushfire, embers (also known as firebrands) such as burning twigs, bark fragments, moss or leaves become temporarily airborne and are carried by winds in a cluster.

Fuel characteristics that make plentiful and efficient firebrands are not definitely known. The material needs to be light enough to be carried aloft in updrafts, yet capable of burning for several minutes while being carried forward by the upper winds. Decayed punky material, charcoal, bark, clumps of dry duff, and dry moss are efficient firebrands. Eucalyptus bark is generally considered the most dangerous source in Australia. This led to the definition of a categorical classification (Bark Hazard) used to evaluate the potential threat of ember attack. The stringybark species of Eucalypt is particularly notorious for contributing large flaming sections of bark that due to their size, weight and shape, can be carried up to several kilometres away. The movements of embers from a bushfire are the primary cause of spot fires, which contribute to the continued spread of a bushfire.

== Fire spotting due to embers ==
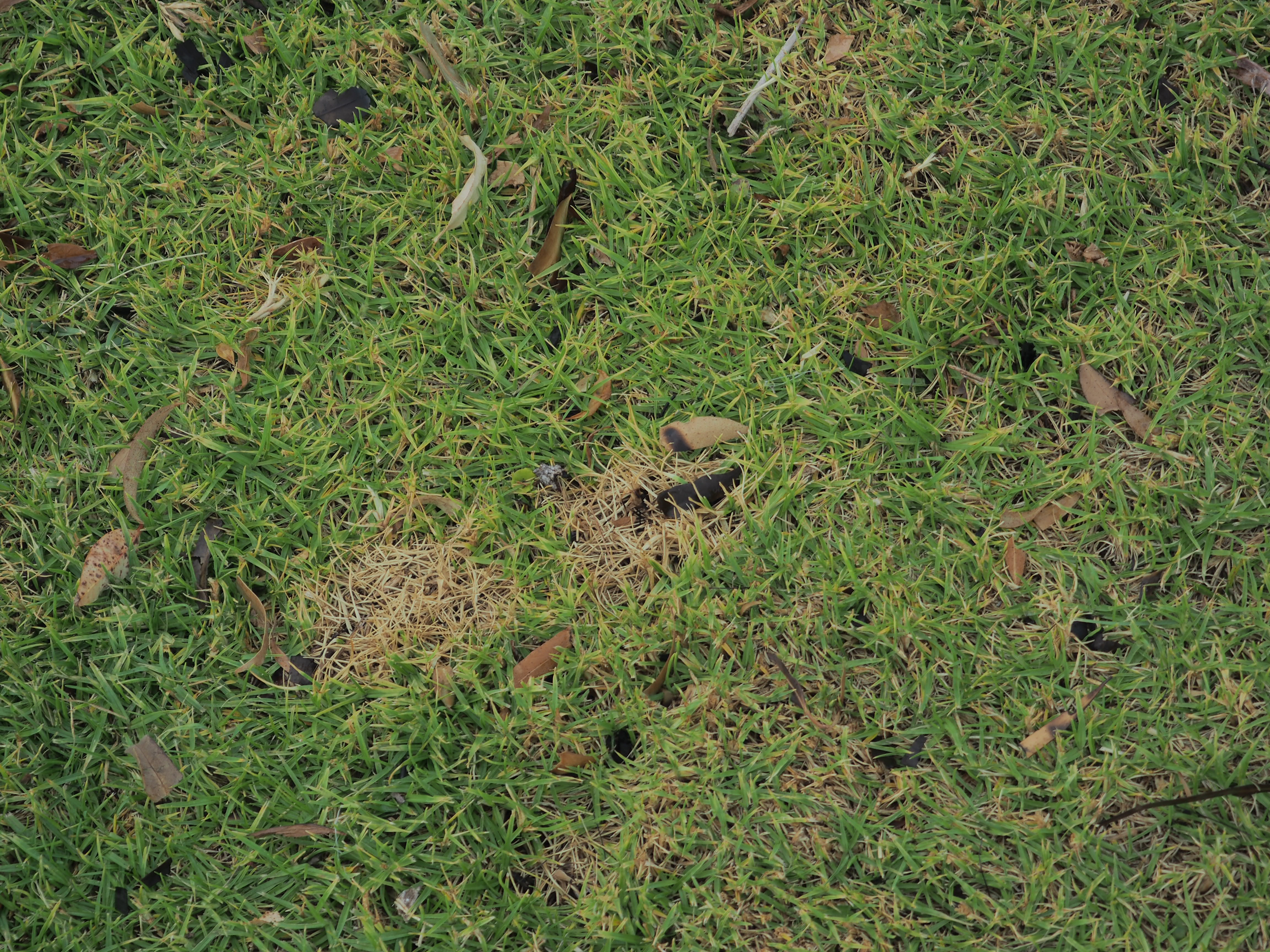
Embers (black material and burned leaves) landed on a well irrigated lawn. The heat from embers caused the yellowing of the grass.

Ember attacks can ignite additional fires ahead of the main fire front. This process is called fire spotting and occurs predominantly with two distinct spatial patters:

- Short distance spotting, where the concentration of spot fires decreases with increasing distance from the ember source. This pattern is generally associated with embers falling from the convective plume due to its turbulence
- Long distance spotting, where fire spotting occurs in distinct and isolated groups at varying distance from the fire front. This is generally associated with the collapse of the pyrocumulus generated by intense fires.

The likelihood of ignition caused by embers is a function of several environmental variables and ember characteristics, including:

- Ambient temperature
- Relative humidity
- Receiving fuel moisture content
- Wind intensity
- Ember material, including its density
- Ember geometry, including shape, aspect ratio, surface area

== Effect on firefighting ==
Ember attacks have the potential to start small fires ahead of the main fire trapping firefighters between the two fires. They can also lodge themselves within firefighting equipment, clothing and vehicles.

In late 2019, a fire truck caught fire in an ember attack in the Currowan bushfire in New South Wales, Australia. Fortunately, the fire team made it out alive. Ember attacks are particularly dangerous to an individual's exposed skin and face.

== Effect on property ==
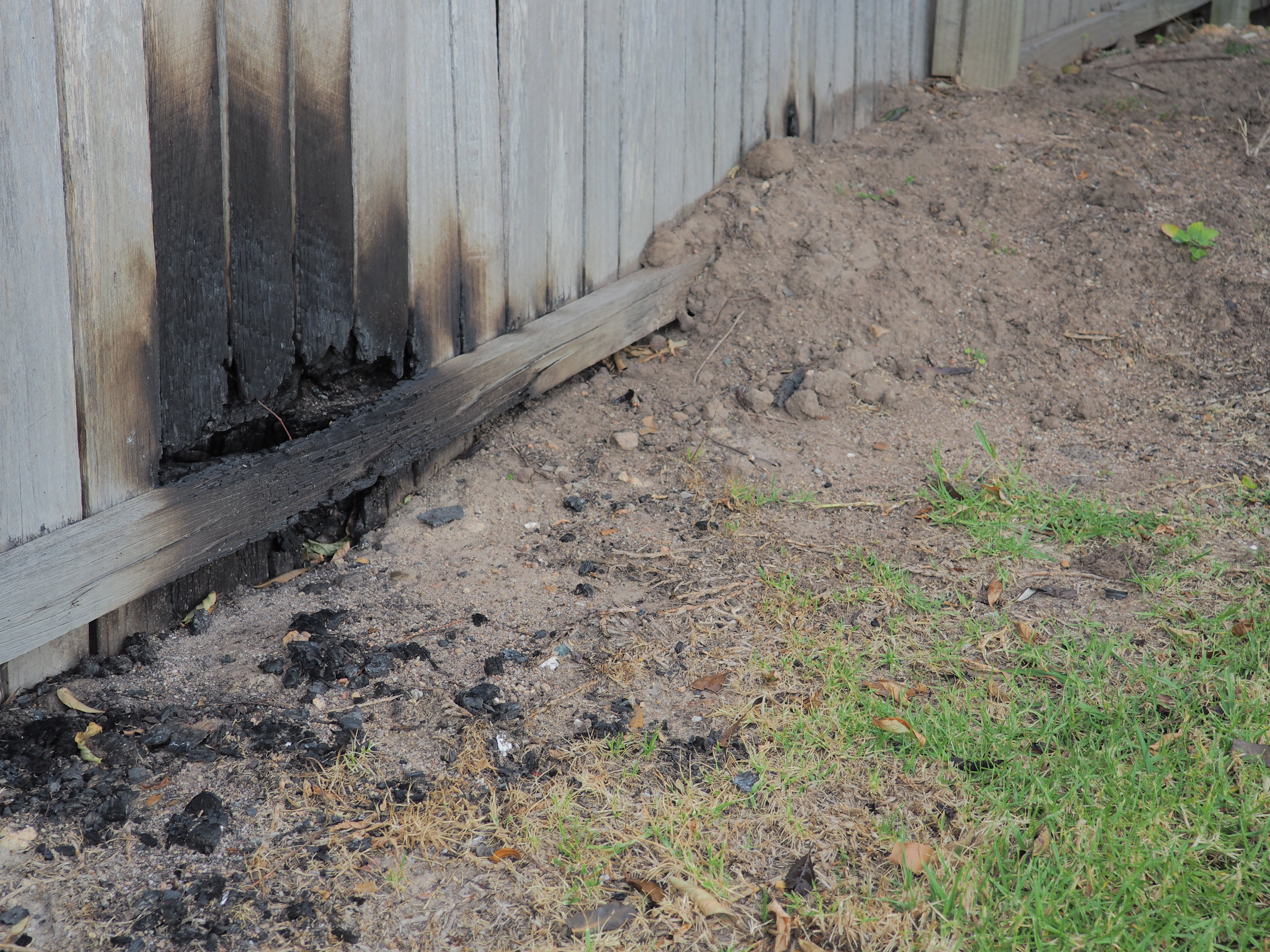
Wood fence damaged due to ember. The horizontal wood beam offered a combustible landing area for the ember to sit and ignite the material

Embers account for 75-80% of total property loss in Australia.

Direct ignition of structures due to ember is possible, for example:

- due to embers entering the property through gaps, vents, windows and doors. This can land to highly combustible material (for example carpet) and start the structural fire
- due to embers landing in gaps within combustible material, for example between the decking boards spacing and on top of deck bearers

However, the majority of property loss happens due to secondary ignitions, for example:

- ignition of garden furniture, house mats, firewood piles
- ignition of garden litter, for example within roof gutters or under the house
- ignition of other structures like sheds, wood fences, cars. This is often referred as consequential fire

Embers commonly cause house loss up to 500 meters from the fire front, and in exceptional circumstances up to kilometers

In Australia, evaporative air conditioners are known to ignite from ember attack. Ember attack causes the filter pads from evaporative AC to ignite, and the fire spreads through the roof space destroying the home. Ember guards (also known as ash screens) are recommended to protect air conditioners from ember attack.
