= Jessica Morse =

American government official and politician (born 1982)

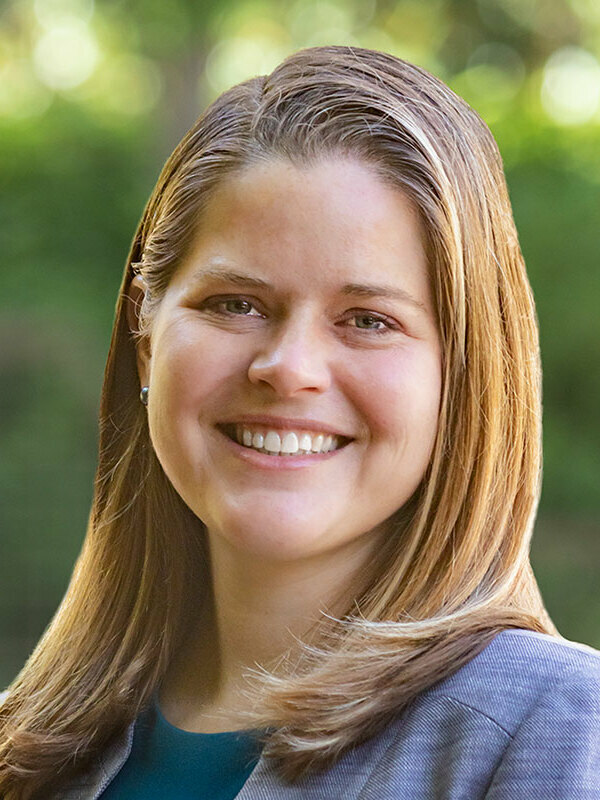

Personal details
- Born: February 23, 1982 (age 43) Pacifica, California, U.S.
- Party: Democratic
- Education: Principia College (BA); Princeton University (MPA)
- Website: Campaign website

Jessica Morse (born February 23, 1982) is an American natural resources manager and politician. Morse has spent her career in public service, having worked in the Department of Defense, Department of State, and the Agency for International Development. She was a Deputy Secretary of the California Natural Resources Agency. She twice ran for Congress.

== Early life and education ==
Morse is a fifth-generation Californian. She was born in Pacifica, California, grew up in Carmichael and Gold Run, and lives in Roseville. She graduated from Principia College in 2004 with a Bachelor's Degree in Economics. In 2010 she earned a master's degree in Public Affairs from Princeton University, with a focus on nuclear non-proliferation and international security.

== Career ==
=== National security ===
Morse spent a decade working in national security for the US Defense Department, the US State Department, and the US Agency for International Development.

=== Natural resource management ===
In 2019, Morse was appointed to the California Natural Resources Agency as Deputy Secretary for Forest and Wildland Resilience. Morse helped secure $2.7 billion in state funding for wildfire resilience, spread over the years 2021 through 2023. David Ackerly, dean of the Rausser College of Natural Resources at UC Berkeley, described Morse as the architect of California's wildfire resilience strategy.

In March 2023, in testimony on forest resilience before subcommittees of the California legislature, Morse stated that two fires in 2022 that were modeled to become megafires, the Electra Fire in Amador County and the Oak Fire in Placer County, were successfully contained because they each encountered strategic fuel breaks.

In August 2022, Morse presented an updated forest management plan for the Jackson Demonstration State Forest, a 50,000-acre state-owned redwood forest in Mendocino County, where protests by environmentalists and tribal leaders had brought commercial logging to a halt.

In 2023, Morse was appointed to the U.S. Wildland Fire Mitigation and Management Commission, which advises federal agencies on how best to handle wildfires.

=== Political campaigns ===
In 2018, Morse ran for Congress as a Democrat in California's 4th congressional district, where she lived before the 2020 United States redistricting cycle, against the Republican incumbent Tom McClintock. McClintock won, 54% to 46%.

In 2024, Morse ran for Congress as a Democrat in California's 3rd congressional district, which after redistricting included her home in Roseville. Her Republican opponent, the incumbent Kevin Kiley, won, 55.5% to 45.5%.
