= SRF Lightning Complex fires =

Wildfire complex in 2022

Six Rivers Lightning Complex
- Part of the 2022 California wildfires
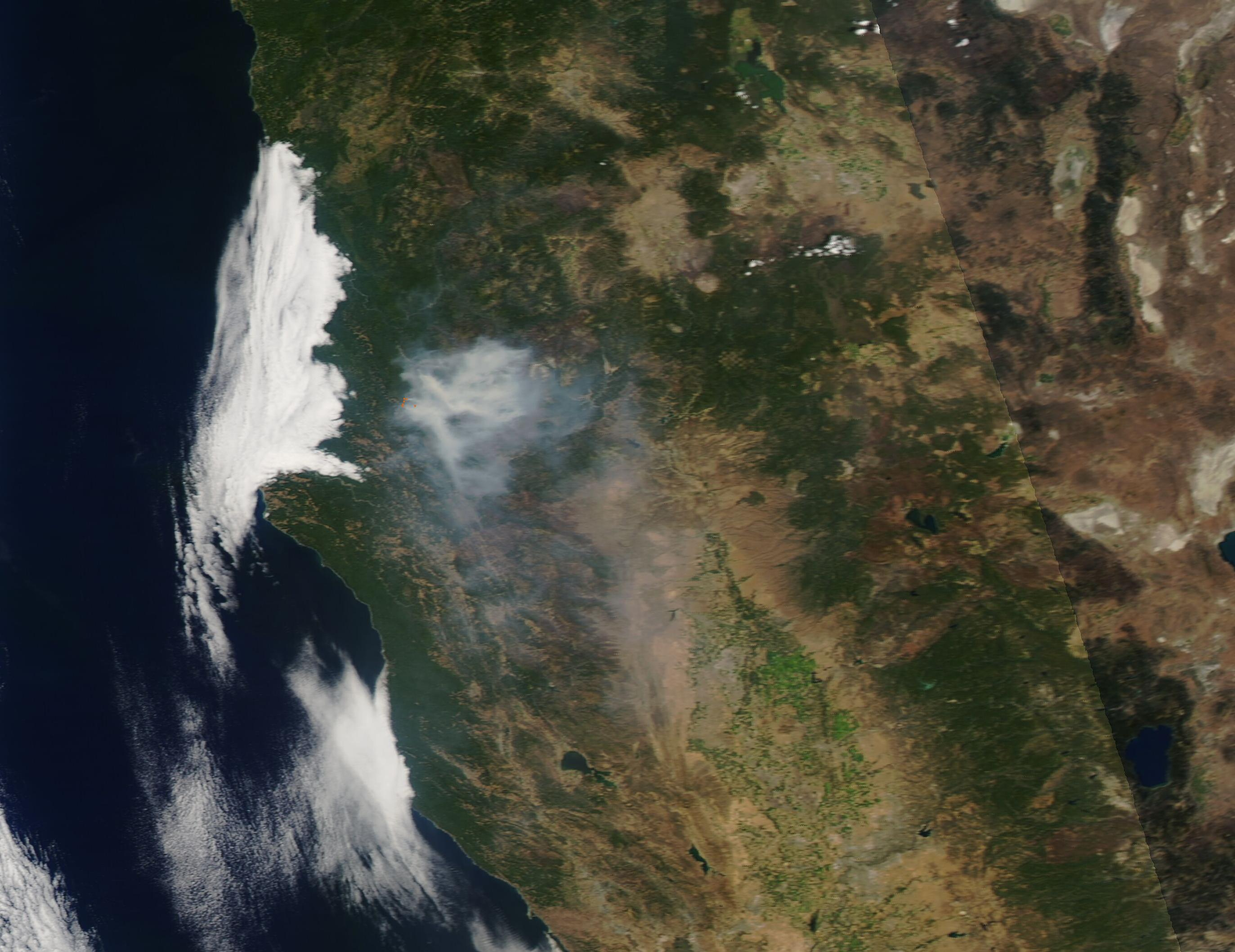
- Smoke from the complex, as seen on August 16, 2022
- Date: August 5, 2022 –; November 2, 2022

Statistics
- Perimeter: 100% contained
- Total fires: 3+
- Burned area: 41,600 acres (16,835 ha; 65 sq mi; 168 km^{2})

Impacts
- Deaths: 0
- Injuries: 5
- Structures destroyed: 37 + 3 damaged

Ignition
- Cause: Lightning

The Six Rivers (SRF) Lightning Complex fires were a series of related wildfires that burned in the Six Rivers National Forest in California from August to November 2022 as part of the 2022 California wildfire season. The fire complex consisted of 12 fires located in Humboldt and Trinity counties.

The complex fire burned a total of 41,600 acres (16,800 ha) from August 5 to November 3, 2022. The Six Rivers Lightning Complex was the only complex fire of the 2022 season, and was the third-largest fire of the season, after the Mosquito Fire and McKinney Fire.

== Progression ==
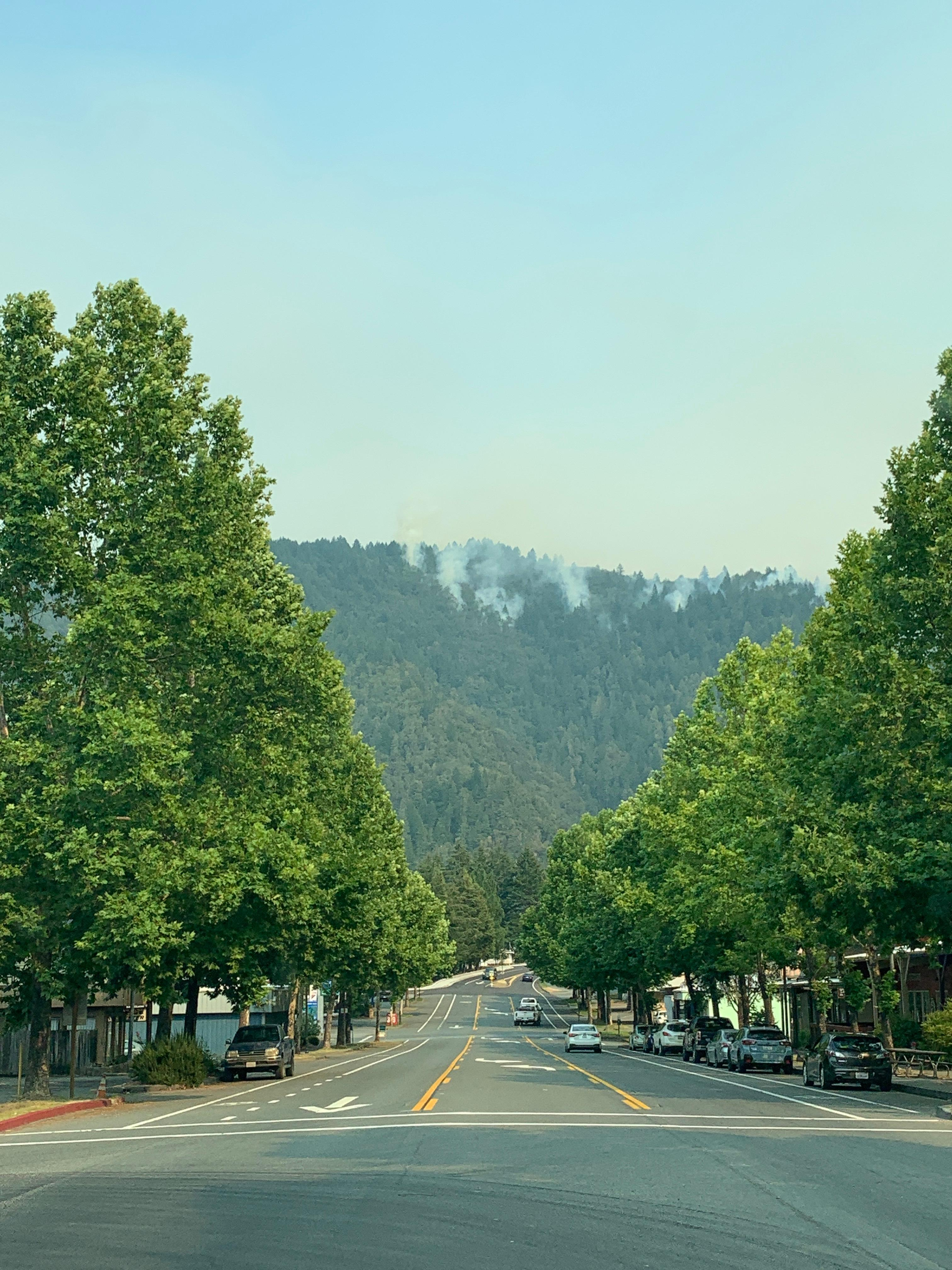
The Campbell Fire, as seen on August 9th. This fire would later merge with two other fires.

The fire complex began on August 5, when 12 fires (6 named: Bremer Fire, Bravo Fire, Campbell Fire, Cedar Fire, Oak Fire and the Waterman Fire) merged. It started in the Willow Creek area, and gained an unknown acreage on the first day of its activity. By August 8, the fire had already gained 6,775 acres in size, and moved into counties. By 8:08 p.m. the same day, 525 personnel were assigned to the fire, including six helicopters. By August 10, the complex nearly doubled in size, reaching 11,618 acres. 740 more personnel were assigned to the complex, bringing the number of personnel actively dispatched to the burning area to 1,265.

By the morning of August 11, the complex had again grown to 12,375 acres, and containment on all 12 fires was still at 0%. One firefighter was injured either during the night of August 11, or in the early morning hours of August 12. Containment on the fires began to rise on August 12, reaching 12% in the morning. On August 13, the acreage of the fires reached 15,232, and an evacuation warning was issued for Willow Creek, Friday Ridge, Salyer and Trinity Village. Containment on August 13 stayed at 12%.

By 6:52 a.m. on August 14, the fire had destroyed two structures, damaged one other and reached 16,924 acres in size. Containment on the fires reached 15%, and personnel responding to the fires went up to 1,810. On August 17 another firefighter was injured. The Campbell, Bremmer and Waterman Fires merged into one large branch, and the Ammon Fire within the complex reached 6,931 acres in size. By August 18, the fires had grown to 28,000 acres collectively, and containment on the complex reached 33%.

On August 19, a total of 1,979 were responding to the fires, which had grown to 25,388 acres in area overnight. Containment on the fires reached 67% for the first time. On August 20, three more firefighters were injured and containment on the now 25,832-acre complex reached 88%. By August 22, the fire grew to 27,019 acres in area, and containment on the complex went down to 80%.

By September 8, eight structures had been destroyed and three were damaged. The fire stayed at a consistent 27,019 acres, and containment on the fire was still 80%. The fire was considered contained after September 13, but was still active until November 2.

== Aftermath ==
=== Injuries ===
5 firefighters were injured in the aftermath of the complex.

=== Damage to structures ===
37 structures (including at least one residential building) were destroyed by the fires, and three more were damaged. A transport vehicle carrying 12 firefighters was also destroyed by the fire, and all equipment inside was lost.

== See also ==
- August Complex fire
- SCU Lightning Complex fires
- 2022 Arizona wildfires
- 2022 Colorado wildfires
