= Colorado Fire =

2022 wildfire in Central California

- Part of the 2022 California wildfires
- Date: January 21, 2022 –; February 3, 2022
- Location: Monterey County, California, United States
- Coordinates: 36°23′23.29″N 121°52′19.87″W

Statistics
- Burned area: 687 acres (278 ha)

Impacts
- Injuries: 1
- Structures lost: 3

Ignition
- Cause: Fire Escaped into Wildland

Map
- Location in California

The Colorado Fire was a wildfire that burned near Big Sur, in Monterey County, California. The fire was first reported around 7:30 p.m. PST on January 21, 2022. As of February 3, 2022, the fire burned 687 acres (278 ha) and was 100% contained. The suspected cause of the fire is said to be from a formerly controlled fire escaping into wildland. It is named after the road it started near, Palo Colorado Canyon Road.

== Events ==
=== January ===
The fire was first reported around 7:30 pm PST on January 21, 2022, on Palo Colorado Canyon Road. Westerly wind gusts of up to 65 mph (105 kmh) helped push the fire to SR 1 and the Pacific Ocean. SR 1 was closed from Carmel-by-the-Sea to Big Sur, along with the communities living around the origin of the fire. An emergency shelter was set up at the Carmel Middle School in Carmel-by-the-Sea, which opened near midnight.

The following day, the wind and fire died down significantly, allowing for tankers to drop water and fire retardant in the path of the fire. The fire is bounded by the 2016 burn scar of the Soberanes Fire on its north and east flanks.

On January 23, a recount of the acres in the fire was released, showing that it was around half of the size first reported. The fire reached 35% containment along with one structure being damaged. The fire was officially regarded as contained and controlled by early February.

== Impact ==
=== Closures and evacuations ===
The Colorado Fire prompted the mandatory evacuation of all areas south of Wildcat Canyon, all areas west of Mount Carmel, and all areas north of Dani Ridge. Andrew Molera State Park was also closed to the public.

== See also ==
- Weather of 2022
- 2022 California wildfires
