= Red Fire =

2022 wildfire in Yosemite National Park

- Part of the 2022 California wildfires
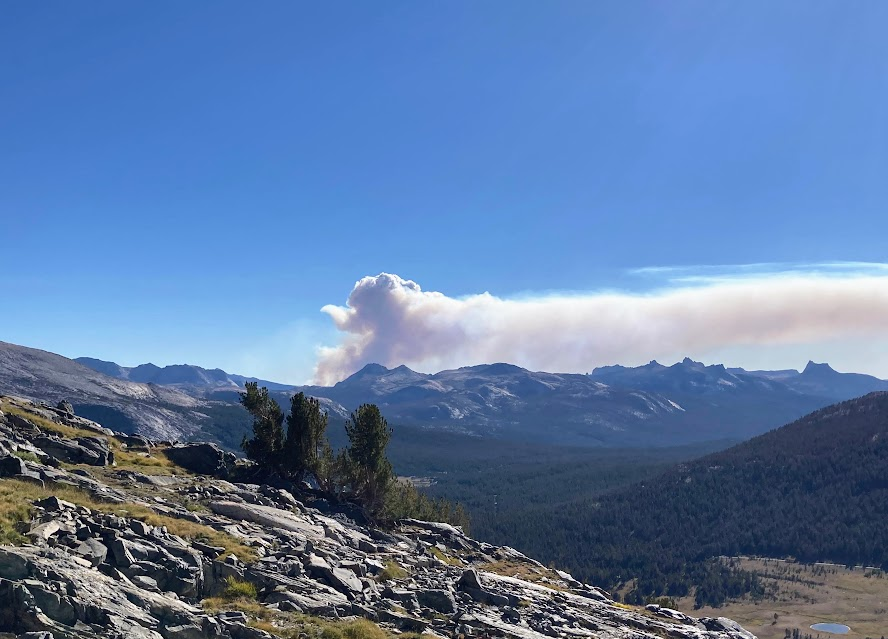
- A small pyrocumulus cloud forms over the Red Fire in Yosemite on August 30, 2022
- Date: August 4, 2022 –; September 20, 2022
- Location: Yosemite National Park, Mariposa County, California, United States
- Coordinates: 37.661°N 119.471°W

Statistics
- Burned area: 8,364 acres (3,385 hectares)

Impacts
- Deaths: 0
- Injuries: 0
- Structures lost: 0

Ignition
- Cause: Lightning

Map
- The general location of the Red Fire in California

The Red Fire was a wildfire that burned in Yosemite National Park, Mariposa County, during California's wildfire season in 2022. Lightning started the fire, which was then discovered on August 4. The fire burned 8,364 acres (3,385 ha) before it was declared completely contained on September 20. The Red Fire burned within the footprint of the 2001 Hoover Fire.

Along with the Rodgers Fire, which was also caused by lightning and burned concurrently in the northern portion of the park, the Red Fire is being managed by Yosemite National Park for ecological resource benefits; both fires are partially corralled by natural barriers such as granite outcrops. A third fire, the Aspen Fire, also burned in the park at the same time, in the footprint of the 2013 Rim Fire.

== Effects ==
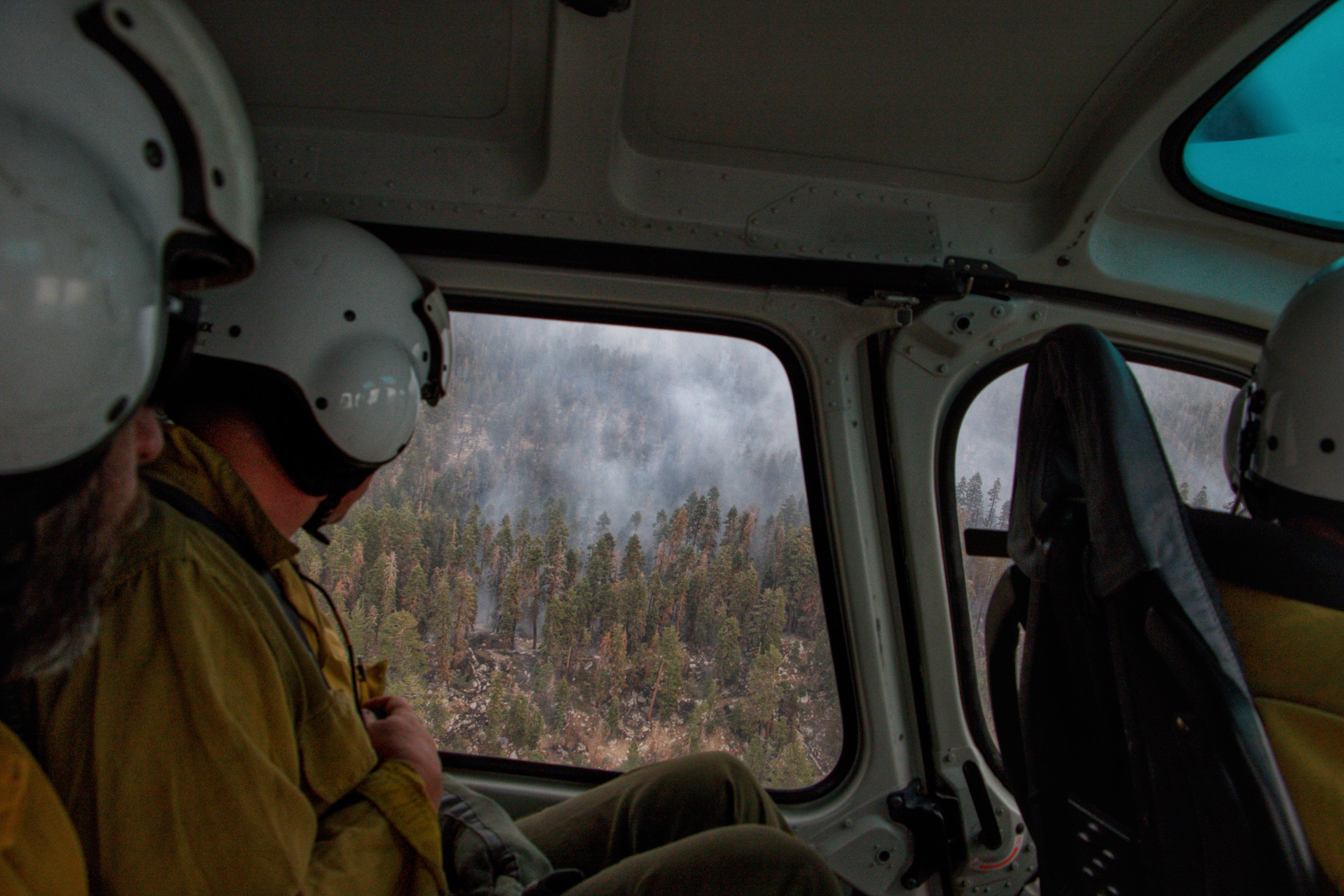
The Incident Commander for the California Incident Management Team flies over the Red Fire in a helicopter on September 13, 2022.

The Red Fire caused no fatalities or injuries, nor were any structures damaged or destroyed. Some hiking trails in the region were temporarily closed for safety. Smoke from the fire at times caused unhealthy air quality levels within Yosemite Valley, the Central Valley, and other nearby areas.
