= Fairview Fire =

2022 wildfire in Southern California

- Part of the 2022 California wildfires
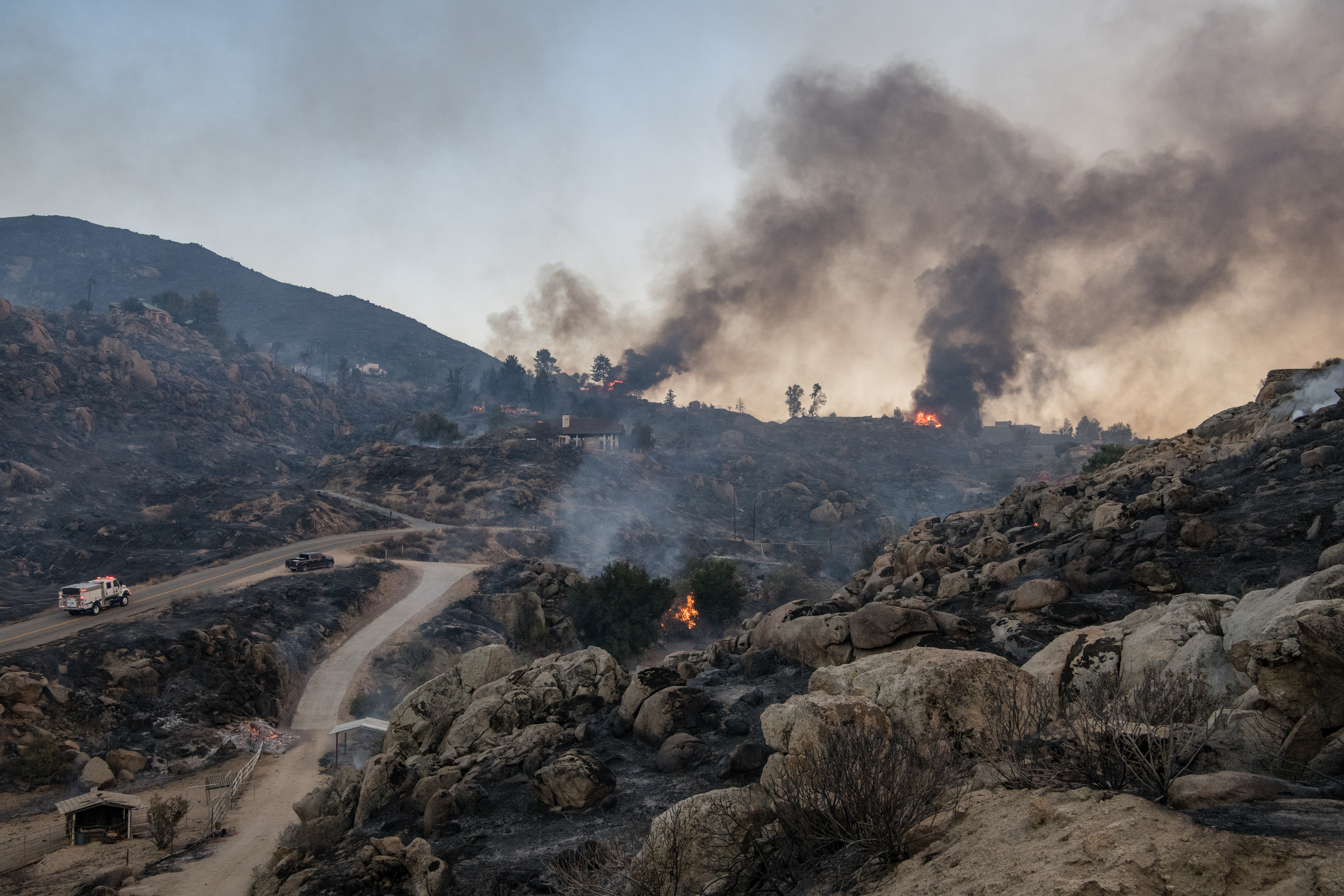
- The Fairview Fire destroys structures in rugged terrain near Hemet on September 5, 2022.
- Date: September 5 –; September 23, 2022; (19 days)
- Location: Riverside County, Southern California, United States
- Coordinates: 33.717°N 116.893°W

Statistics
- Burned area: 28,307 acres (11,455 ha)

Impacts
- Deaths: 2 civilians
- Injuries: 4
- Structures lost: 35 structures; 6 damaged

Ignition
- Cause: A sagging electrical line rubbed up against brush and ignited.

Map
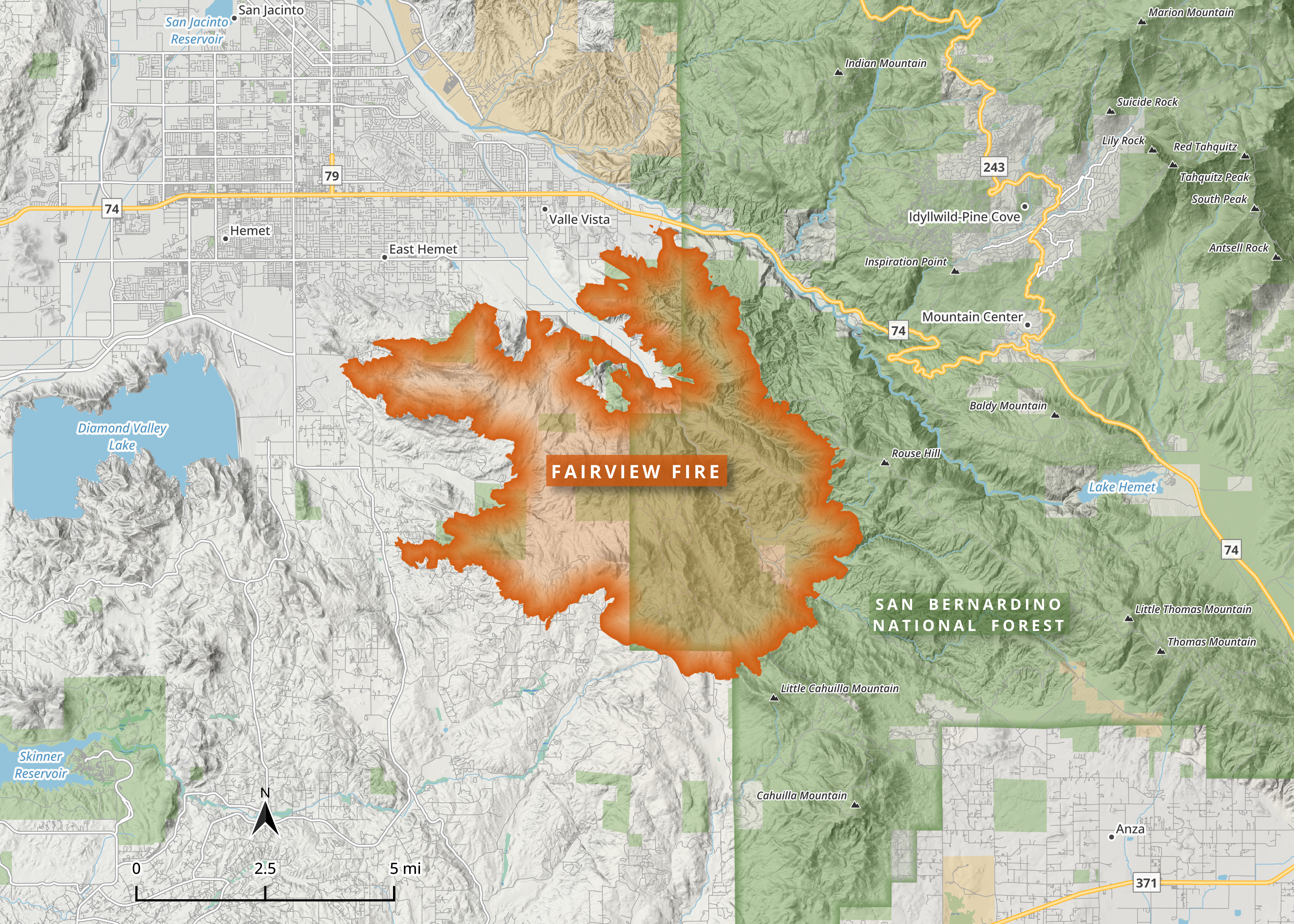
- The footprint of the Fairview Fire in Riverside County

- The Fairview Fire's general location in Southern California

The Fairview Fire was a deadly and destructive wildfire that burned during the 2022 California wildfire season southwest of Valle Vista and east of Hemet in Riverside County, California in the United States. The fire ignited on September 5, 2022, during a severe heatwave that had plagued much of the southwest throughout early September and, due to the extreme weather conditions, grew to a deadly and destructive conflagration in the chaparral-filled foothills within just several hours of igniting.

The fire fatally injured two civilians attempting to flee from the fire and severely injured another, as well as destroying 13 structures. As of September 10, the fire has grown to 28,307 acres (11,455 ha).

== Background ==
Much of the Southern California area had been stricken by a prolonged drought and was in the midst of experiencing a severe heatwave which further exacerbated conditions during the week of the fire. Although there had not been any recent significant fire history through the chaparral dense canyons east of Hemet leading up to the Fairview Fire, two significant fires—the 2013 Mountain Fire & 2018 Cranston Fire—had burned a combined 40,000 acres and dozens of structures in the Mountain Center region just east of the Fairview Fire's footprint. Additionally, to the west of the Fairview Fire, the 1993 California Fire & 2003 Mountain Fire burned a combined 35,000 acres and hundreds of structures within the fire area.

== Progression ==
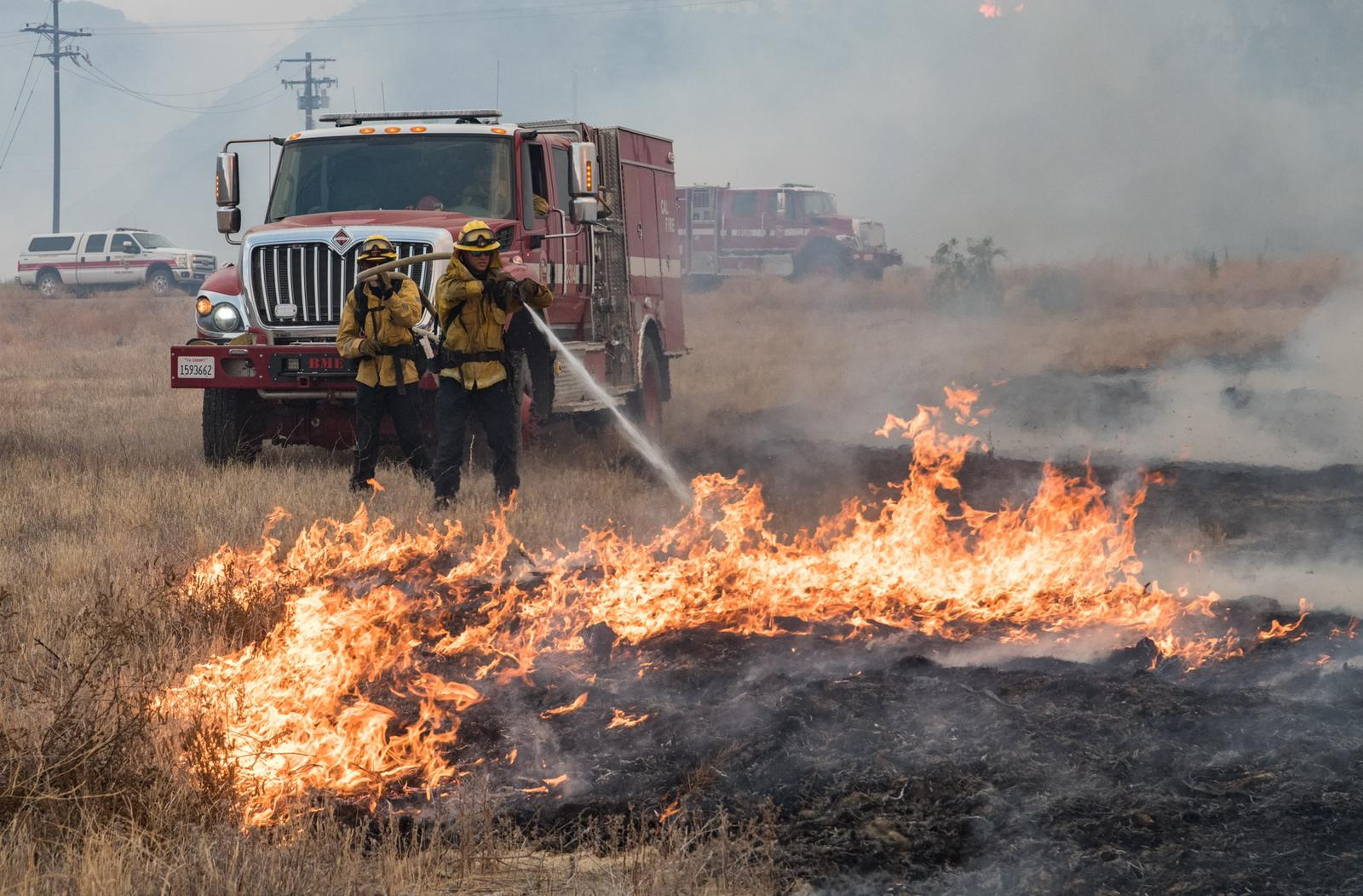
Firefighters battle a hotspot on the Fairview Fire on September 8, 2022, when the fire was 27,319 acres and 5% contained

=== September 5 ===
The fire was reported at approximately 3:37 p.m. PDT on September 5, and was soon dubbed the Fairview incident due to its proximity to Fairview Avenue near Bautista Road. The fireline immediately exhibited extreme-to-critical growth as the first reports indicated the fire covered 20 acres and was rapidly expanding to the south and west toward Simpson Park and nearby rural residences. The wildland–urban interface in which the fire was burning in led to difficulty establishing structure protection and evacuation efforts were hampered as the fire rapidly exploded to an estimated 600 acres within an hour of burning. The fire continued its dramatic push toward west into the lower foothills of Hemet before wind conditions changed direction, sending the fire east back into and toward the chaparral dense hillsides. By 10:40 p.m. PDT that evening, the fireline had reportedly expanded to 2,703 acres and had already destroyed seven structures and killed two civilians while severely injuring another.

=== September 6 ===
Throughout the following day, September 6, the fireline continued to burn aggressively as the front burned toward the east due to a late afternoon wind shift that sent the fire east and south. By this time, the fire was still burning amid a severe heatwave as firefighting conditions remained critical with the flaming front headed toward Cactus and Bautista Canyon. 3,400 residences remained evacuated as the expanding fire thus expanded the evacuation zones from Highway 74, west of Mountain Center, north of Cactus valley and toward Anza, north of Highway 371 to the forest boundary. By late Tuesday, the fire was 4,500 acres in size and containment had only risen to five percent. The conflagration continued to show aggressive fire behavior through its second night as the bulk of the fire moved southeast, deeper into the foothills.

=== September 7 ===
By the morning of September 7, the fire had grown to 7,091 acres as the mandatory evacuation order expanded in virtually all directions as the fire itself effectively grew in all directions with the most active areas of the fire remaining at the southeast corner in the Bautista Canyon area, and along Rouse Ridge. By that afternoon, the fire had grown to 9,846 acres and by late that evening, the fire had exploded to 19,377 acres as the fire still remained only five percent contained. During that timeframe, the fire line proceeded to advance toward the community of Sage where new evacuations orders for areas south of Cactus Valley Road, north of Minto Way, north of Red Mountain Road, west of the U.S. Forest Service boundary and east of Sage Road were spurred. Due to the continued extreme fire behavior rapidly outpacing fire personnel, Riverside County declared a local emergency to help the county more easily address the fire in an effort to make the county eligible for federal and state financial assistance.

=== September 8 ===
Flames continued to aggressively push southeastward on September 8, from Highway 74 down to rural communities in the Sage Creek area. Over 1,100 firefighting personnel were battling fire. By the evening, the fire had expanded to a reported 23,919 acres, with containment remaining stagnant at five percent. That same day, California governor Gavin Newsom declared a state of emergency for affected area, freeing up additional resources to fight the blaze and for people affected.

=== September 9 onwards ===
Interactive map of the fire

Heavy rain and thunderstorms brought to the area on September 9 by Tropical Storm Kay southwest of San Diego in the Pacific, benefitted firefighters as the tropical moisture saturated the area, mitigating some of the threat posed by high winds and dry conditions. The fireline remained 28,307 acres in size and containment had spiked to forty percent. Additionally, more than 2,200 firefighters were engaging the fire front as the number of structures threatened was reduced to 8,764 and a significant portion of evacuation orders had been reduced to warnings in the surrounding fire area, although there were now threats of mudslides in the burn area. In the afternoon, a helicopter assisting with operations in the fire crashed while attempting to land at the Banning Airport, moderately injuring three firefighting personnel.

== Effects ==
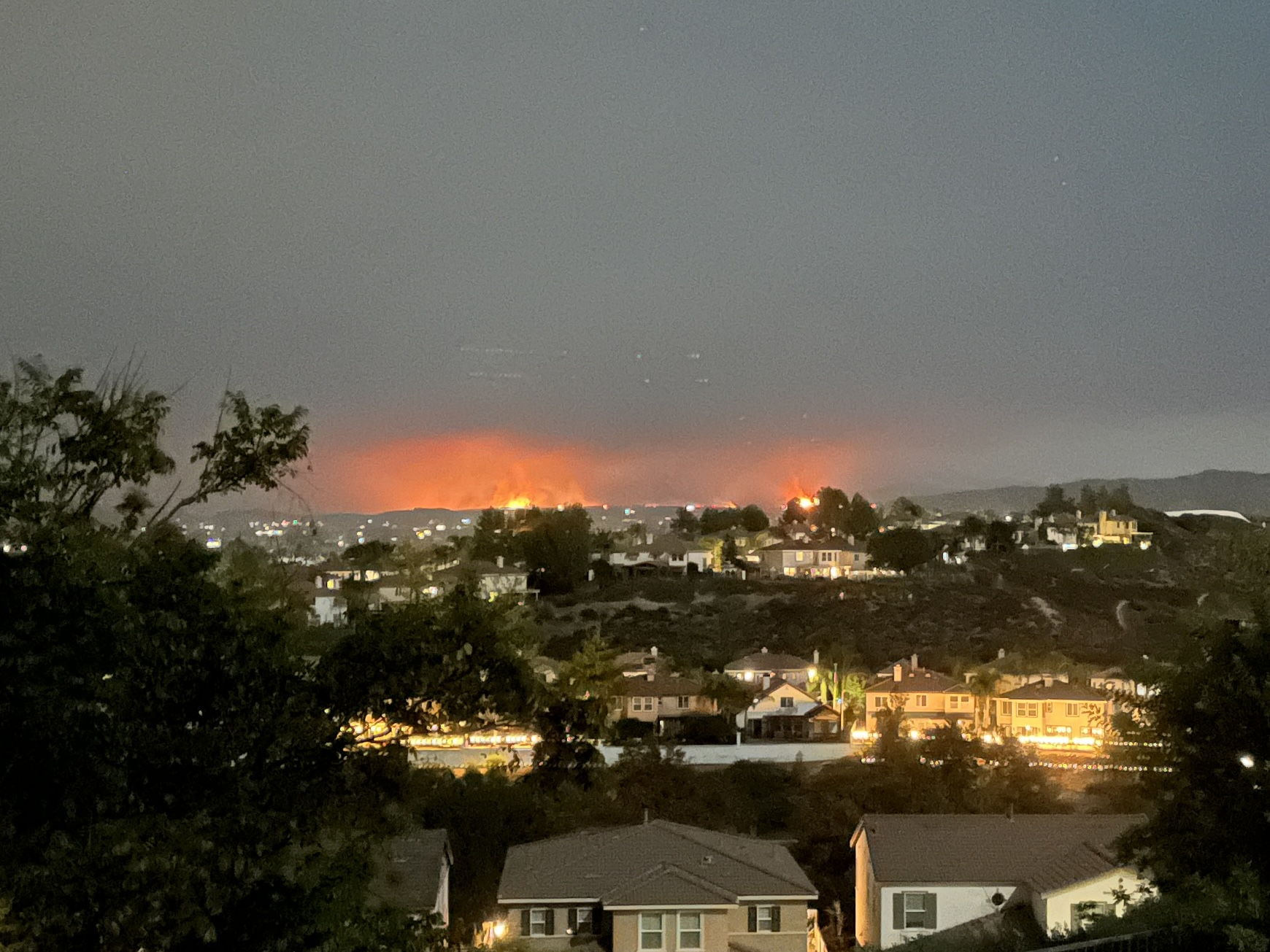
Fairview Fire as seen from Temecula, 15 miles away

The Fairview Fire resulted in the deaths of at least two civilians who had been attempting to escape the rapidly moving fire before becoming overrun by the fireline, while a third civilian had been severely injured with third degree burns to their upper body. The two had died in their vehicle while attempting to escape the fire while fleeing to a home in the 42400 block of Avery Canyon Road.

=== Closures and evacuations ===
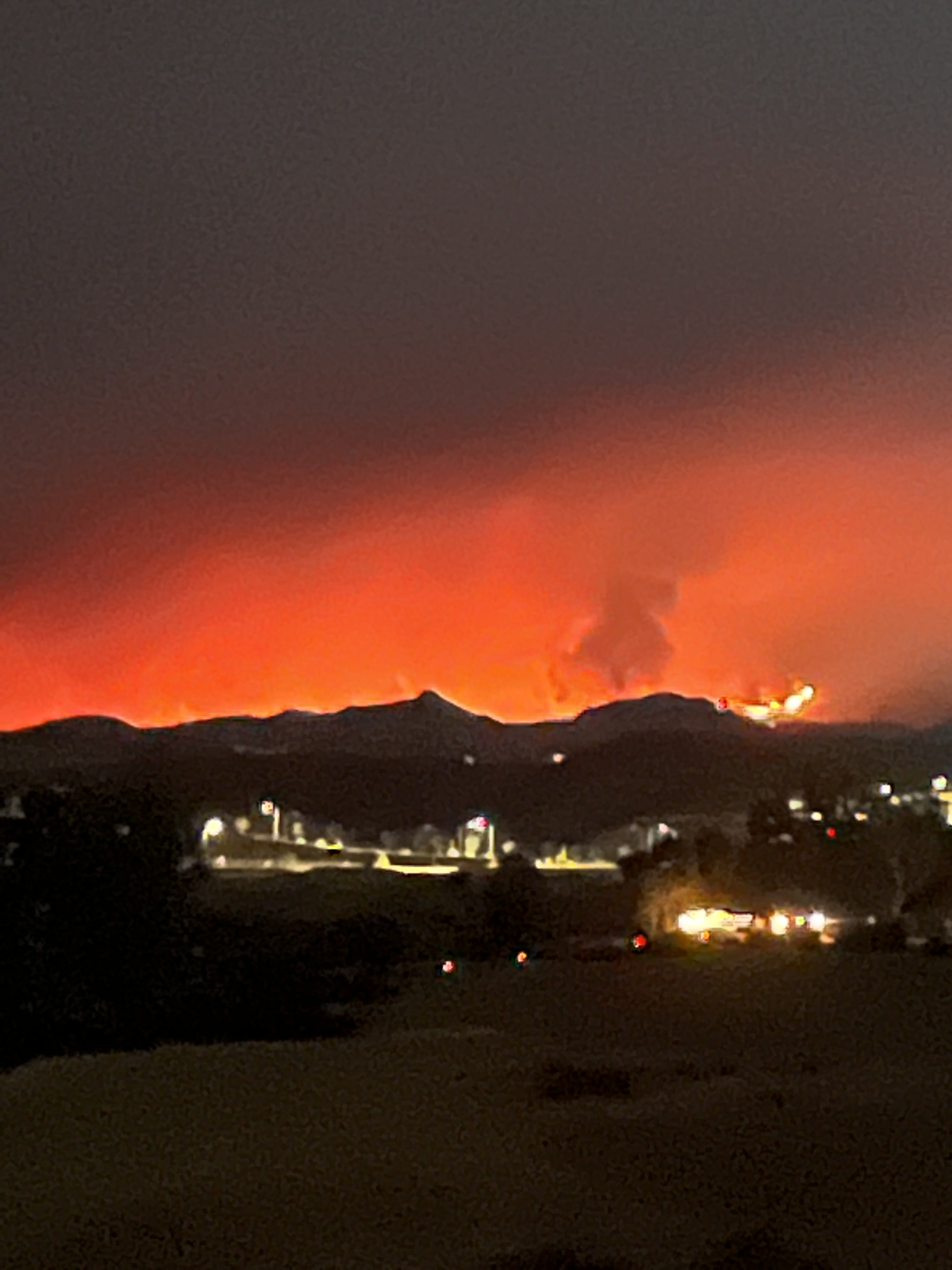
Fairview Fire seen up close

Due to the dramatic and explosive growth of the wildfire in such a short period of time, authorities recognized the immediate need for all the surrounding rural communities to evacuate, thus mandatory evacuation orders were placed for all residents south of Stetson Avenue, north of Cactus Valley Road, west of Fairview Avenue and east of State Street. 1,500 homes were evacuated and an estimated 5,000 structures were threatened. An evacuation center was set up at Tahquitz High School in Hemet for the affected residents. An additional evacuation center would later open up for additional residents as the fire would eventually spur further evacuations to the surrounding communities. The second shelter was located at the Temecula Community Center, 30875 Rancho Vista Road.

== Cause ==
While the cause of the wildfire is still currently under investigation, it is known that Southern California Edison reported "circuit activity" around the same time the fire was reported at 3:37 p.m. Monday. It was unclear if the circuit activity was or whether SoCal Edison's equipment had played a role in starting the fire.

== See also ==
- 2022 California wildfires
