= McKinney Fire =

2022 wildfire in Northern California

- Part of the 2022 California wildfires
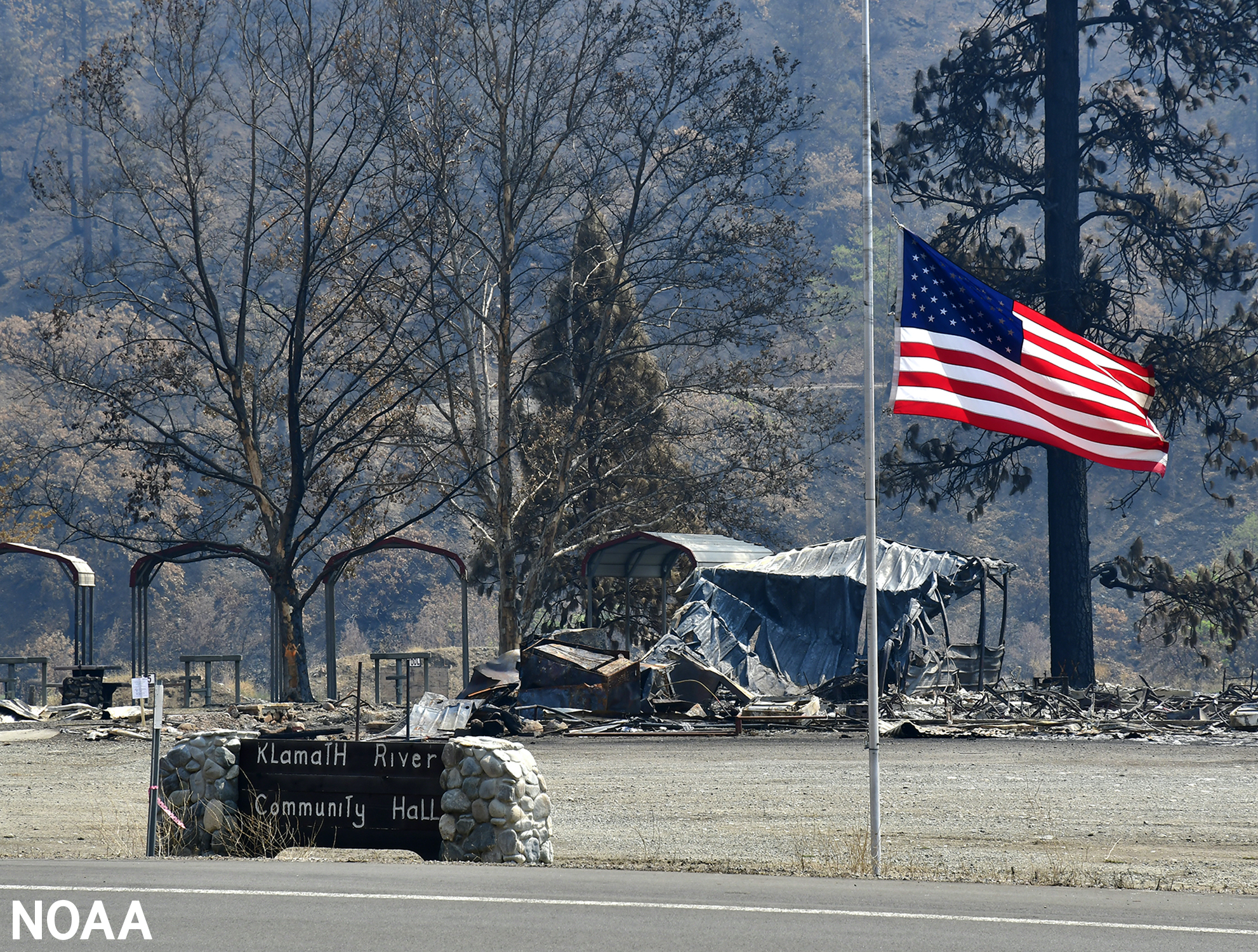
- Remains of the Klamath River Community Hall, seen 1 month after the McKinney Fire
- Date: July 29 –; September 7, 2022; (41 days)
- Location: Siskiyou County, Northern California, United States
- Coordinates: 41.833°N 122.894°W

Statistics
- Burned area: 60,138 acres (24,337 ha; 94 sq mi; 243 km^{2})

Impacts
- Deaths: 4 civilians; 0 firefighters
- Injuries: 0 civilians; 12 firefighters
- Evacuated: 5,800
- Structures destroyed: 185 destroyed; 11 damaged
- Cost: $87.4 million (cost of suppression)

Ignition
- Cause: Under investigation

Map
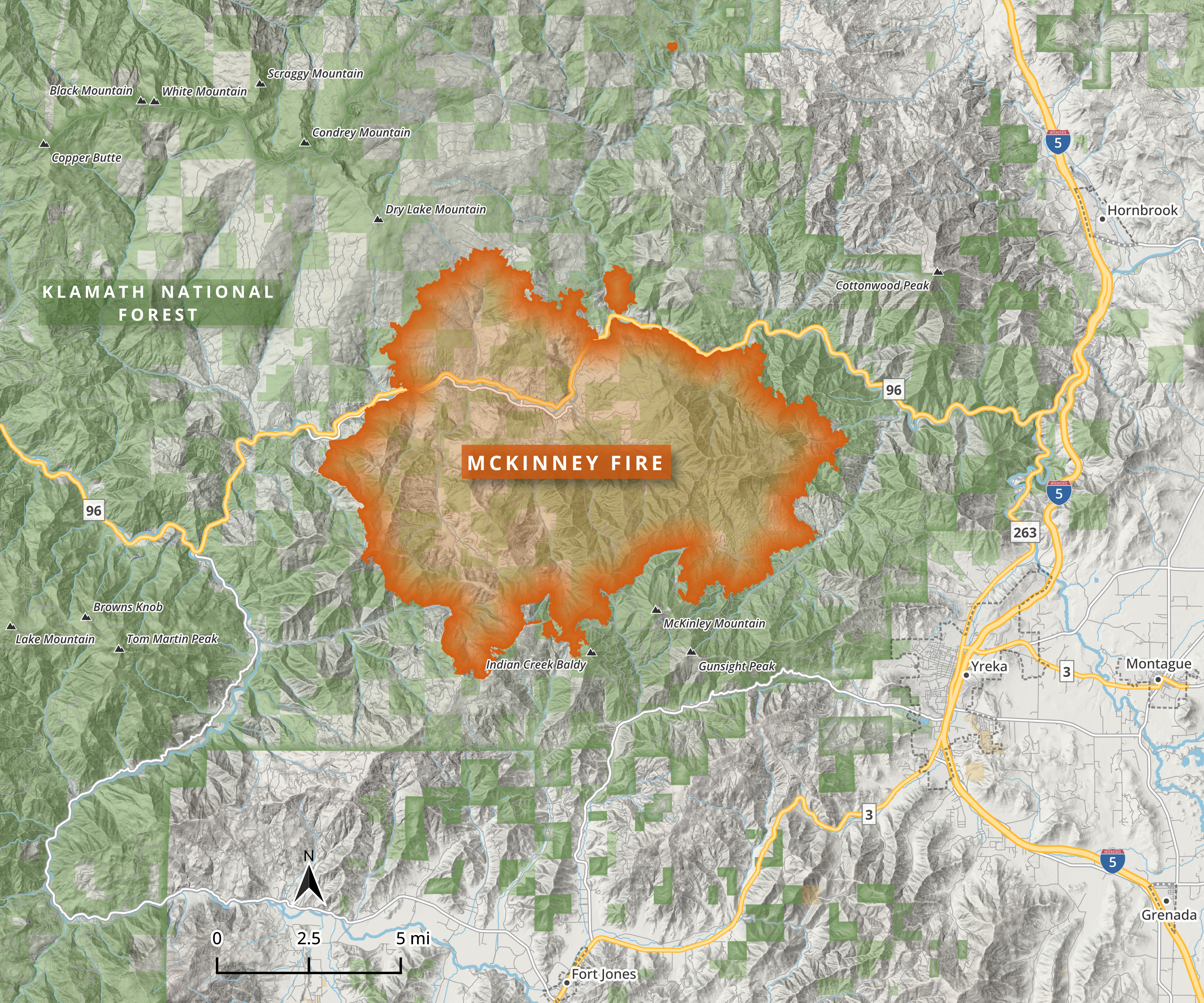
- The footprint of the McKinney Fire

- Location of the McKinney Fire

The McKinney Fire was a destructive wildfire in the Klamath National Forest in western Siskiyou County during the 2022 California wildfire season. The fire was named for its ignition point near McKinney Creek Road, where the fire began on July 29, 2022, at approximately 2:15 p.m. PDT. The McKinney Fire experienced explosive weather-driven growth over the next day and a half, consuming more than 50,000 acres in less than 36 hours, destroying at least 185 structures (including most of the community of Klamath River) and causing 4 fatalities.

The McKinney Fire burned 60,138 acres (24,337 hectares) in total. Subsequent precipitation over the burn scar led to localized flooding and debris flows, which damaged infrastructure and killed "tens of thousands" of fish in the Klamath River and its tributaries. It was the deadliest wildfire of 2022 in California, the second-most destructive (after the Oak Fire in Mariposa County) and the second-largest, surpassed by the Mosquito Fire in Placer and El Dorado counties.

== Background ==
The environment for the fire's growth was fueled by a combination of drought, high temperatures, and dry thunderstorms. In late July, the majority of Siskiyou County was designated as being in extreme drought by the U.S. Drought Monitor and National Drought Mitigation Center. Yreka, the nearby county seat for Siskiyou County, had recorded only about half of its usual precipitation for the year.

The region was also trapped within a heat dome, or a ridge of high pressure, in the Pacific Northwest during late July, similar to (but less extreme than) the June 2021 Western North America heat wave. Temperatures in the region repeatedly hit triple digits, and in Montague (just east of Yreka) they had not fallen below 96 degrees in over two weeks. This further dried out vegetation in the region. Much of the fire's eventual footprint had also not burned since the 1955 Haystack Fire, allowing fuels to build up in an area with a history of commercial logging, replacing old-growth trees with younger, denser, and less fire-resistant plantations.

== Progression ==
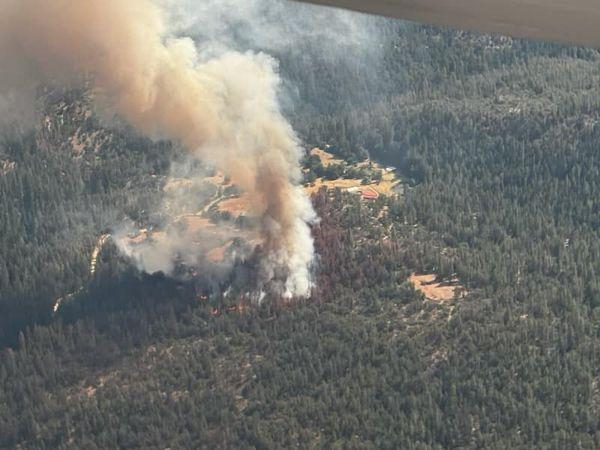
An aerial view of the McKinney Fire on July 29, 2022, shortly after it began.

The McKinney Fire was first reported in the afternoon of July 29, 2022. Officials were unsure of the cause, but did not believe it was started by a lightning strike. The fire grew quickly after starting, influenced by nearby thunderstorms, which produced gusty outflow winds without rain. By 8:30 pm, the fire was roughly 300 acres. On the night of the 29th, amid extreme fire behavior, the McKinney Fire generated an enormous pyrocumulonimbus cloud that reached approximately 50,000 feet into the troposphere and stratosphere, generating its own lightning. Firefighters were forced to "shift from an offensive perimeter control effort to evacuations, point protection and structure defense."

The next morning, on July 30, the fire was assessed at approximately 18,000 acres amid a red flag warning for the region for heat, potential lightning-sparked wildfires, and wind from more thunderstorms. At 12:29 pm, the McKinney fire was mapped by FIRIS as 29,677 acres. Governor of California Gavin Newsom declared a state of emergency for Siskiyou County on July 30, as a result of the McKinney Fire. The city of Yreka additionally declared a local emergency the same day.

The fire continued to burn and remained active overnight, climbing to 51,468 acres and losing all containment. On July 31, the fire behavior and spread moderated, trapped beneath an inversion layer as thunderstorms with more wetting rain remained over the region as a result of the summer monsoon. However, those same storms also produced many cloud-to-ground lightning strikes, resulting in multiple nearby ignitions.

Conditions during the first few days of August remained much the same, with monsoonal moisture limiting fire activity and allowing fire suppression crews to build firebreaks by hand and with bulldozers to gain containment. The firefighting effort drew personnel through mutual aid programs from many other states, as far afield as Delaware and Pennsylvania. At its peak, more than 3,500 personnel in total were involved in combatting the McKinney Fire.

Areas within and near the McKinney Fire's burn scar received evacuation warnings in March 2023 for potential debris flows following heavy rains. The McKinney Fire burned partially in areas previously burned by the 1955 Haystack Fire and the 2014 Beaver Fire.

== Effects ==
The McKinney Fire resulted in 4 fatalities, all civilians: two victims were found deceased in their vehicle together in their driveway off a road near Highway 96, and two were found later at separate residences near Highway 96. The first pair were found on the morning of July 31 and the news was released on the morning of August 1, while the second two victims were found the morning of August 1 and the news was released on August 2. One of the victims was identified as a longtime wildfire lookout in the region for the Forest Service, though she was not on duty at the time. Additionally, at least 12 firefighters were injured during the suppression effort.

The fire also resulted in the destruction of at least 185 structures, including much of the community of Klamath River. At least 118 of the destroyed structures were homes. Notable structures destroyed also included the Klamath River Community Hall and a building in Oak Knoll that housed archives for the Karuk tribe. At least 11 more structures suffered damage.

=== Closures and evacuations ===
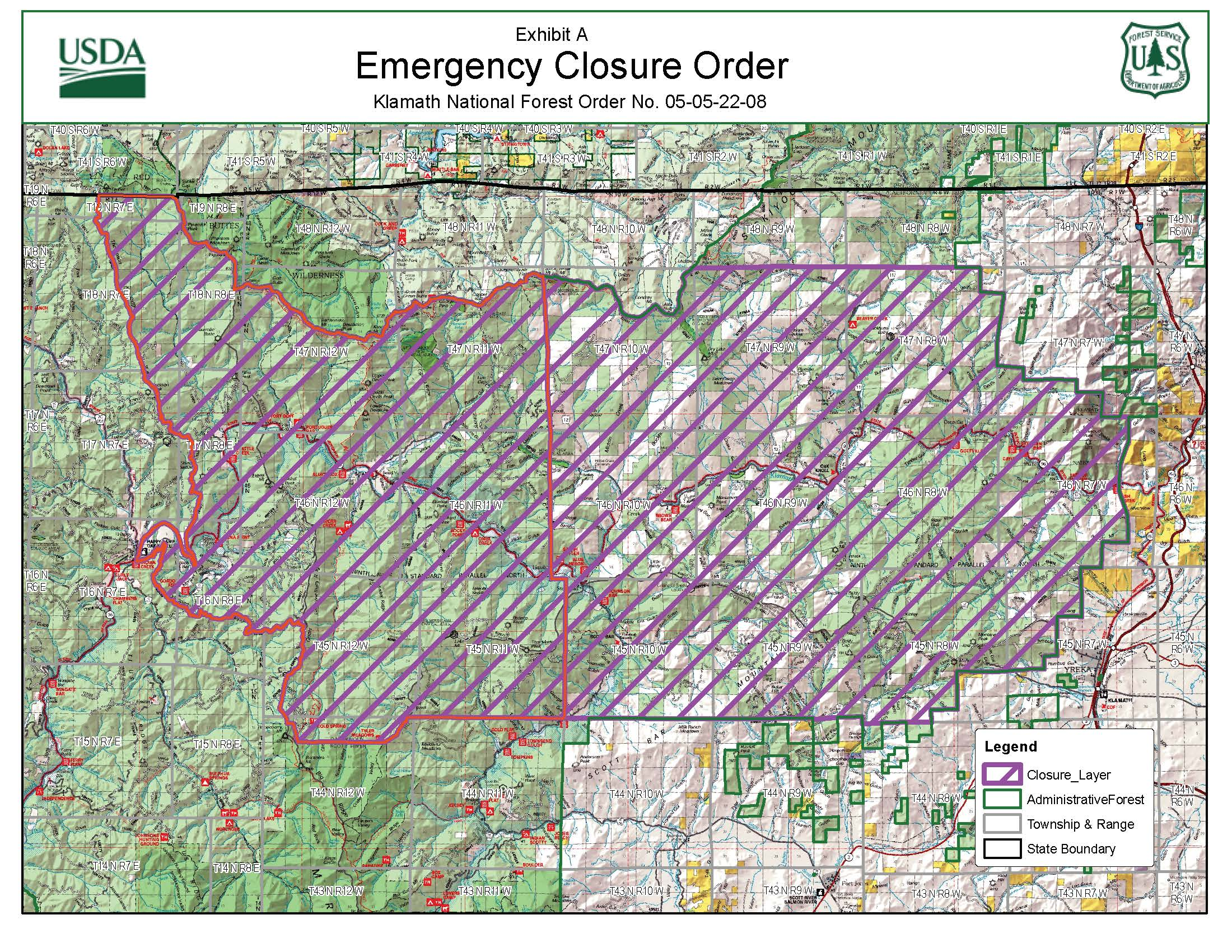
Portions of Klamath National Forest closed because of the McKinney Fire

Evacuation warnings and orders were put in place throughout Siskiyou County, including evacuation orders for Seiad Valley, Horse Creek, and Klamath River, and evacuation warnings for portions of the city of Yreka. More than 5,800 people are impacted by evacuation orders.

California State Route 96 was closed throughout the fire footprint. Much of Klamath National Forest along the Highway 96 corridor between Yreka and Happy Camp was closed to public access by the U.S. Forest Service (USFS) between August 3 and September 6, 2021. The USFS additionally closed a 110-mile-long portion of the Pacific Crest Trail, between Etna Summit in California and Mount Ashland Campground in Oregon. Search and rescue teams from both Oregon and California assisted in evacuating at least 60 hikers on the PCT, who were not in immediate peril but were at risk due to the fire's rapid growth and low visibility.

Two people were arrested within an evacuation area, with one booked for possession of burglary tools and one for burglary within an evacuation zone.

Interactive map

==== Media access abuse allegations ====
The Siskiyou County Sheriff's Office announced they were investigating several news organizations, including ABC News, KRCR News Channel 7, CBS News, KDRV News Channel 12 and the Los Angeles Times over abuses of media privileges while accessing the McKinney Fire area. Alleged abuses included bringing unauthorized civilians into the fire zone, trespassing on private property (including locations where human remains were found), and opening burned vehicles to film them. KRCR, a Redding-based affiliate of Sinclair/ABC, disputed the allegations, as did the Los Angeles Times.

In one case, Matt Gutman, an ABC News chief national correspondent, broadcast from the fire zone with a Siskiyou resident looking for her missing uncle on his property. Human remains were then found on the property. An ABC spokesperson claimed they notified law enforcement immediately upon the discovery by the residents, while the Sheriff's office claimed ABC News had reported on the discovery of the remains before authorities could process the scene and notify family of the deceased. While California law traditionally gives media unlimited access to "scenes of disaster, riot, or civil disturbance," per California Penal Code 409.5 (d), the media is forbidden to access locations that would interfere with investigations. Because the cause of the McKinney Fire is unknown, the Sheriff's Office argued that the disturbed property where the human remains were found qualified as an active crime scene investigation.

=== Environmental impacts ===
Smoke from the McKinney Fire caused unhealthy air impacts in parts of Northern California and Southern Oregon. The Oregon Shakespeare Festival in Ashland was forced to move shows indoors because of smoke.

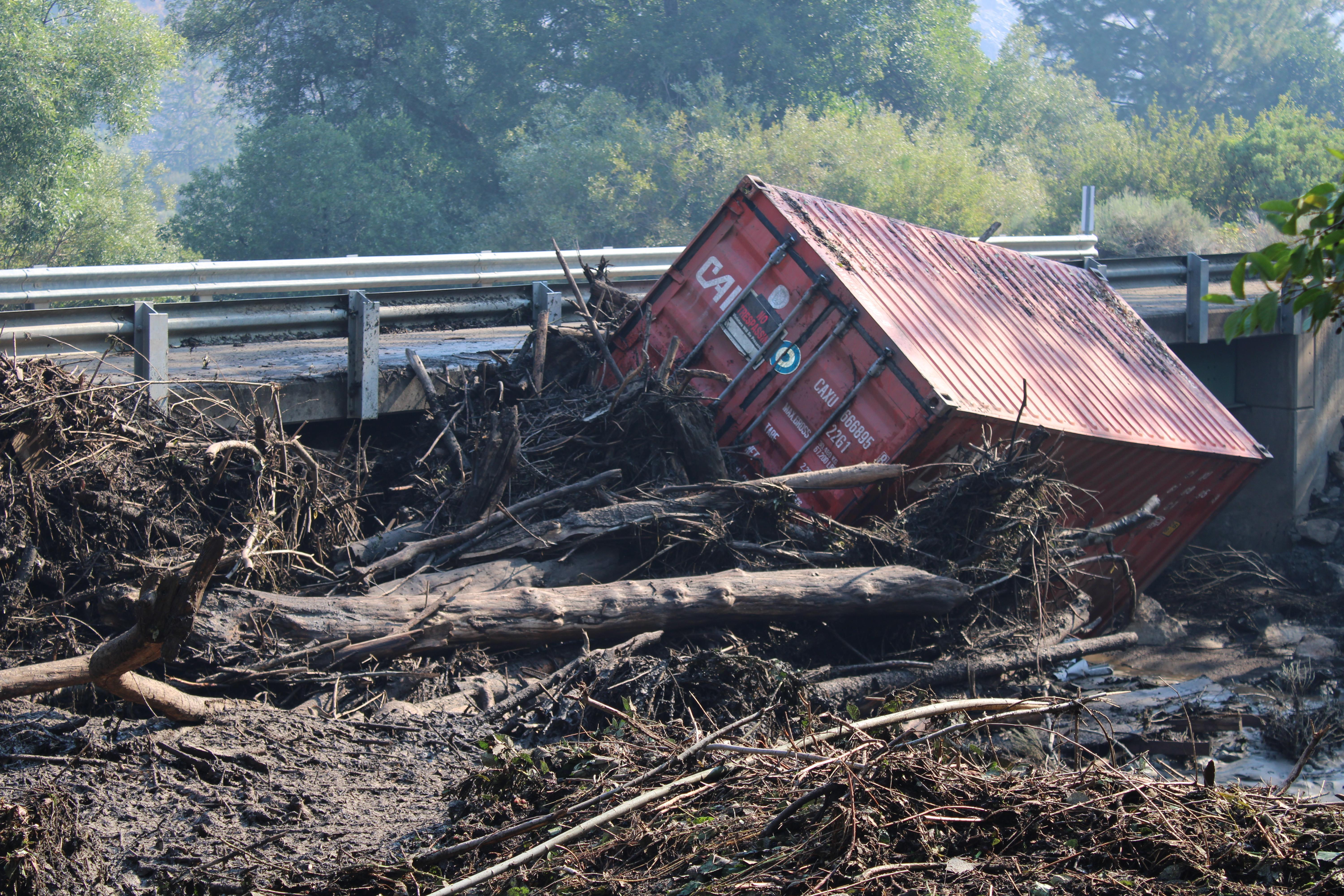
A shipping container wedged against a bridge by debris flows in Humbug Creek on August 3

On August 2, up to 3 inches of precipitation fell over the east side of the McKinney Fire burn area, causing localized flooding and releasing large debris flows into tributaries of the Klamath River, including Humbug Creek and McKinney Creek. The debris flows were significant enough to double the flow of the Klamath River in some areas from 1,000 feet per second to 2,000 feet per second for a period. A private contractor working with fire crews was hospitalized with non-life-threatening injuries after flood water and debris flows caused a bridge to give out, trapping him inside his vehicle.

The debris flows also caused massive fish die-offs in the Klamath River. A remote monitoring system managed by the Karuk Native American tribe recorded the oxygen saturation level in the Klamath River near Seiad Creek (20 miles (32 km) downstream of the debris flows) plunging to 0% for several hours on the night of August 3 and again on August 4. This caused the death of what may have been tens of thousands of fish along a 50-mile stretch (80 km) of the Klamath River. The species affected included suckers, juvenile salmon, lamprey eels, crayfish, and steelhead trout. The Karuk and Yurok Native American tribes have been working for years to protect fragile salmon populations in the Klamath River, which may be further impacted as a result of the fire's aftereffects.

== Cause ==
The cause of the McKinney Fire is officially unknown. According to radio dispatches, the fire began beneath the 12,000-volt Scott Bar distribution power line owned and operated by the electric utility Pacific Power, a business unit of PacifiCorp. That line had lost power at approximately 9:00 p.m. the night before the fire, and service had been restored at approximately 5:00 a.m. on the morning of the day the fire started. The utility claimed it had patrolled the entire line and been unable to determine the outage's cause. Residents of Klamath River speculated whether work on the power line in the neighborhood was the cause of the fire, sharing images of the area taped off. The utility stated on August 5, 2022, that it was not aware of any of its equipment being seized in relation to the McKinney Fire. On August 8, PacifiCorp and the Forest Service both commented, noting that the McKinney Fire's cause was under investigation by Cal Fire and that neither party had been granted access to the ignition area as a result. As of August 7, Cal Fire had declined to comment on the investigation.

== Fire growth and containment ==
Fire containment status Gray: contained; Red: active; %: percent contained;
Date	Area burned acres	Containment
Jul 29	40	
Jul 30	30,000	(acreage approximate)
Jul 31	52,498	
Aug 1	55,493	
Aug 2	56,459	
Aug 3	57,519	
Aug 4	58,668	
Aug 5	59,666	
Aug 6	60,109	
Aug 7	60,271	
Aug 8	60,379	
Aug 9	60,389	
Aug 10	60,389	
Aug 11	60,389	
Aug 12	60,392	
Aug 13	60,392	
...	...	...
Sep 7	60,138	

== See also ==
- List of California wildfires
- 2014 Happy Camp Complex Fire
