= Border 32 Fire =

2022 wildfire in Southern California

- Part of the 2022 California wildfires
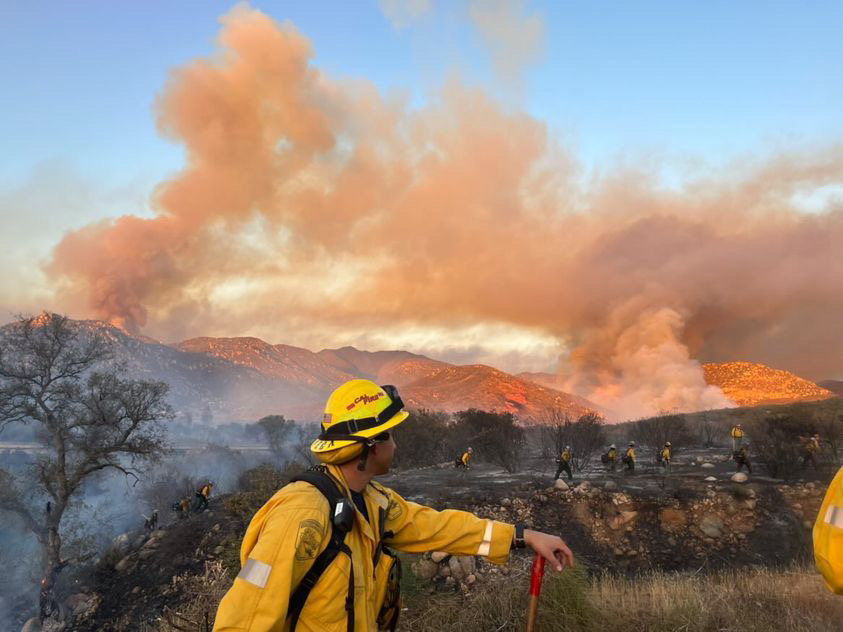
- Firefighters work to contain the Border 32 Fire on the evening of August 31, 2022.
- Date: August 31, 2022 –; September 5, 2022
- Location: Barrett Junction, San Diego County, California
- Coordinates: 32.612181°N 116.707395°W

Statistics
- Burned area: 4,456 acres (1,803 ha)

Impacts
- Injuries: 2 civilians, 1 firefighter
- Structures lost: 10 structures destroyed

Ignition
- Cause: Under investigation

Map
- Location in Southern California

Location of Border 32 Fire

The Border 32 Fire was a destructive wildfire that burned amid the 2022 California wildfire season, in the Barrett Junction area along Highway 94 due north of the United States-Mexican border in San Diego County, California during a statewide heatwave. The fire started on August 31, 2022, and proceeded to destroy ten structures and eventually grow to 4,456 acres (1,803 ha) within the rugged chaparral-dense hillsides throughout the area.

== Background ==
The area in which the Border 32 Fire has had a long and destructive history with severe wildfires throughout the San Diego County backcountry along Highway 94 leading into the town of Potrero. The most notable significant fires of recent years had been the Santa Ana wind driven Harris Fire of October 2007 which destroyed much of the land the Border 32 incident would ultimately burn in a 90,000-acre swath that destroyed hundreds of structures and killed eight civilians. More recently, the Border Fire which burned 7,609 acres and also killed 2 civilians, had burned in a similar footprint as that of the Border 32 Fire had toward the east along the community of Potrero in June 2016.

== Progression ==
=== August 31 ===
The blaze—dubbed the Border 32 Fire due to it being the thirty-second fire of significance for the year of 2022 in close proximity to the United States-Mexican border—sparked at 2:15 PM PDT off Barrett Lake Road and state Route 94 in the Barrett Junction area just southeast of Dulzura and was initially pegged at 30 acres in size but with a dangerous-to-critical rate of spread as it moved toward the north east into the small community of Barrett Junction. Evacuations orders were immediately put in place for the small community as the fire rapidly burned through the cheatgrass and into the dense chaparral along the mountainsides and up toward Potrero Peak. The fire would begin an aggressive push towards the rural community of Potrero which then lead authorities to issue a mandatory evacuation order for the entire town as well as much of the rural backcountry west of Campo. By 5 PM, the incident had expanded to 1,400 acres in size as the fire remained spreading at a dangerous rate with zero percent containment. As the fire dramatically spread, two individuals suffered severe burns from the fire and were airlifted to UCSD Medical Center in San Diego and one firefighter sustained minor injuries.

Throughout the day, the fire would continue to rapidly expand as it destroyed thousands more acres before sundown, crossing much of Highway 94 and proceeding to burn towards the community of Potrero. However, by nightfall, fire activity largely subsided allowing resources to mop up spot fires & keeping the progressing fireline held in place through the night. As of 10 PM, that evening, the fire had scorched 4,243 acres and was five percent contained.

=== September 1 onward ===
Throughout the Border 32 Fire's second day, activity remained low since the night before despite extreme rising temperatures reaching up to 108 °F and low relative humidity in the immediate area as the fireline was holding at 4,438 acres in size. Evacuation order remained in place for much of the area, although residents west of Cochera Via Drive and east of Potrero Valley Road — near the outer edges of the fire — were allowed to return home as by this time over 400 firefighting personnel were containing flareups and hotspots within the burned out landscape. By evening time of September 1, the fire was fourteen percent contained.

By early morning on September 2, the fire was pegged at twenty percent containment and the fireline remained stagnant at 4,438 acres consumed. Schools in the Jamul-Dulzura Union and Mountain Empire Unified school districts remained closed due to the blaze. By evening time, all evacuation orders for the affected areas had been lifted. On September 3, the Tecate border crossing reopened after being shut down for several days due to the fire as containment grew to eighty percent.

Containment grew over several day and by September 5, the Border 32 Fire was fully contained with the acreage totaling 4,456 acres in size with ten structures, including several homes, destroyed by the fire. Firefighters remained committed to the fireline for several more days to monitor and control lingering hotspots within the fire area.

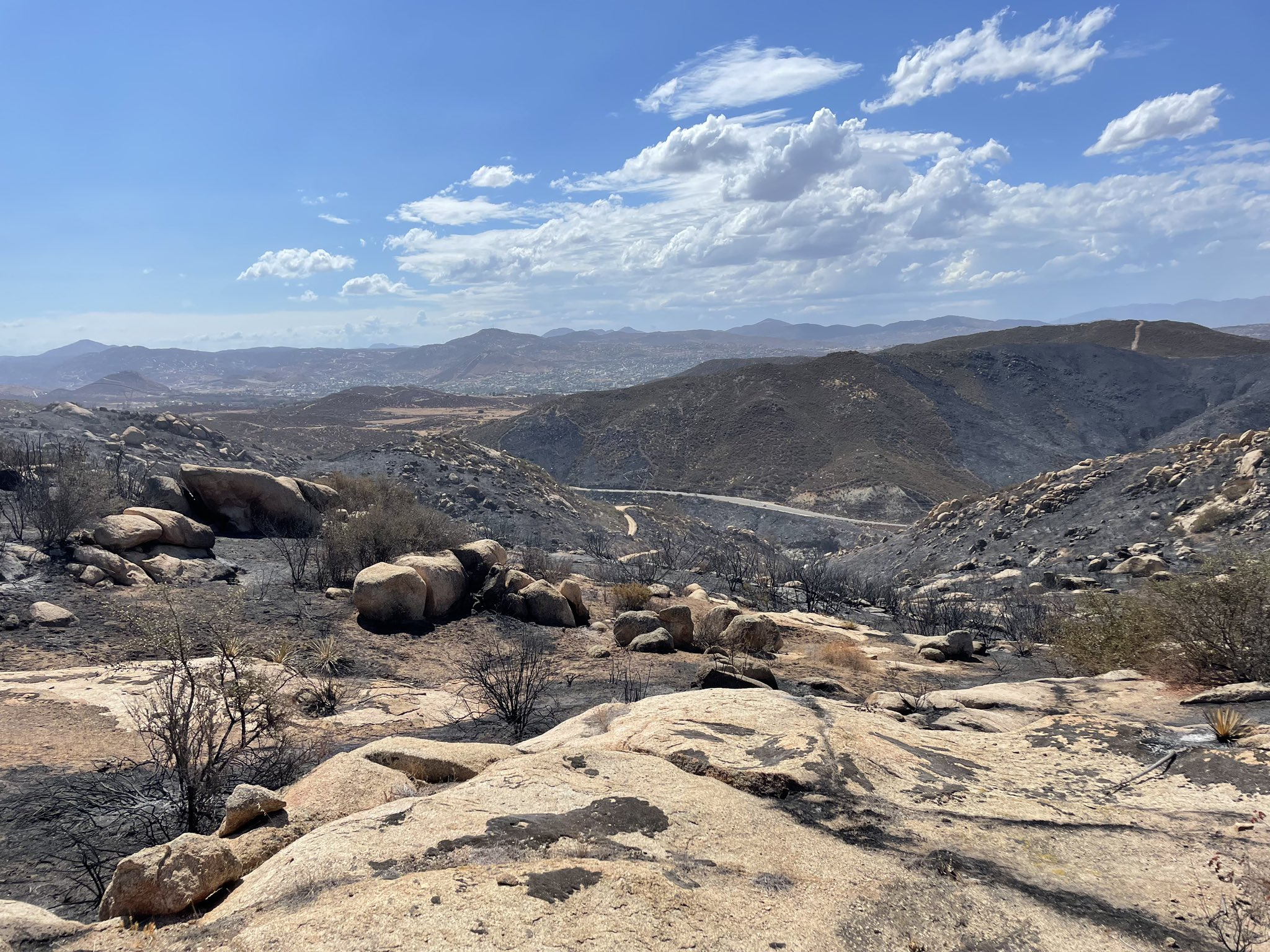
The charred landscape in the wake of the Border 32 Fire on September 5, 2022.

== Effects ==
=== Closures and evacuations ===
Due to the dramatic and fast-moving spread of the Border 32 Fire, mandatory evacuations were ordered for over 400 homes throughout area from along Barrett Lake Road area, Coyote Holler Road area and Round Potrero Road near Potrero and Dulzura, forcing hundreds of residents to flee. An evacuation center was established at Mountain Empire High School for those affected.

== Cause ==
As of September 5 (the containment date of the fire), the initial cause of the Border 32 Fire remained under investigation.

== See also ==
- 2022 California wildfires
- 2016 Border Fire
