= Route Fire (2022) =

2022 wildfire in Southern California

- Part of the 2022 California wildfires
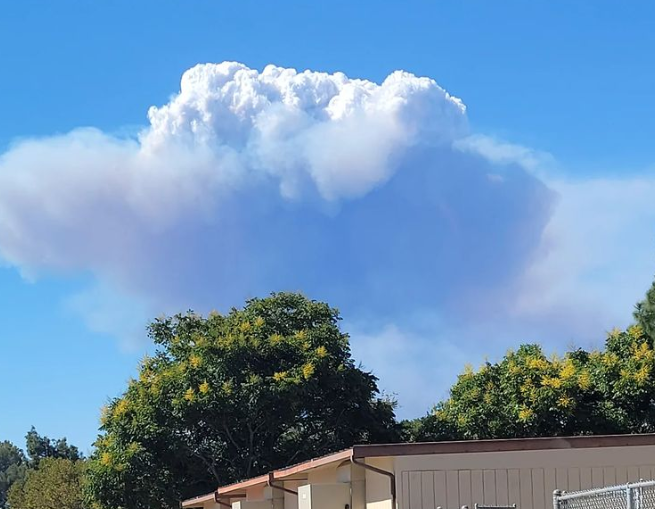
- Following image shows the Route fire burning on August 31, 2022
- Date: August 31, 2022 –; September 7, 2022
- Location: Castaic, Los Angeles County, California
- Coordinates: 34.5255°N 118.6479°W

Statistics
- Burned area: 5,208 acres (2,108 ha)

Impacts
- Injuries: 7 firefighters
- Structures destroyed: 2 structures destroyed

Ignition
- Cause: Under investigation

Map
- Location in Southern California

Location of Route Fire

The Route Fire was a wildfire that burned during the 2022 California wildfire season, along Interstate 5 near the community of Castaic in Los Angeles County, California during a dramatic state-wide heatwave in late August and early September, 2022. At least seven firefighters sustained heat-related injuries, while two structures were destroyed and 5,208 acres (2,108 ha) burned.

== Background ==
The Route Fire started during what was the most intense heatwave of 2022 at that point, prompting Governor Gavin Newsom to issue a state of emergency. There was significant dry brush in the fire's area.

== Events ==
=== Context ===
Southern California was experiencing a significant heatwave at the time. Conditions at the time were very dry and hot which were ingredients to create a fire like this one. On August 31, 2022, at 1:48 PM local time the fire began.

=== August 31 ===
When the fire began, temperatures had reached well over 100 degrees. A few minutes after it began, it burned about 60 acres. Nearly 40 minutes later, the fire more than doubled its size, which grew to about 165 acres. Later that evening, the fire soared into growth heading up to 4,625 acres with still 0% containment.

=== September 1 ===
The next day (September 1, 2022) the fire still expanded, but not by a lot. As the fire expanded to 5,208 acres, firefighters were able to contain the fire ever so slightly at a 12% containment. Eventually that evening, the fired had stopped expanding as the FD was able to advance containing about 27% of the fire.

=== September 2 ===
By the morning of September 2 containment reached 37%. By that evening it had grown to 56% containment.

=== September 3 ===
The morning of September 3, 2022 firefighters contained 71% of the fire. That containment grew to 87% before the next day.

=== September 4 ===
The containment grew up to 91% of this morning. Eventually before the next day it was reported to have a 96% containment.

=== September 5 ===
Around this point, the containment was up to 98% at 7:50 AM local time before the whole fire was completely extinguished.

== Impact ==
=== Closures and evacuations ===
Closures of Interstate 5 (both northbound & southbound) were reported. Traffic eventually piled up especially ones headed to the north as the Labor day weekend approached. The day after the fire ended (September 8, 2022) all of the northbound lanes were opened back & 2 southbound lanes opened as well. Eventually due to some poor road conditions, 2 of the right northbound lanes remained closed. At Vista Del Lago, southbound lanes were closed while northbound lanes were closed at Lake Hughes Road. For the Northbound 5, it wasn't until a few days later all lanes were reopened.

The fire caused evacuation orders to be issued in nearby communities. Residents north of the fires (in Paradise Ranch Mobile Homes) were sheltered at Frazier Mountain High School.

== Cause ==
The cause of the Route Fire is unknown.

== See also ==
- 2022 California wildfires
