= 2022 California wildfires =

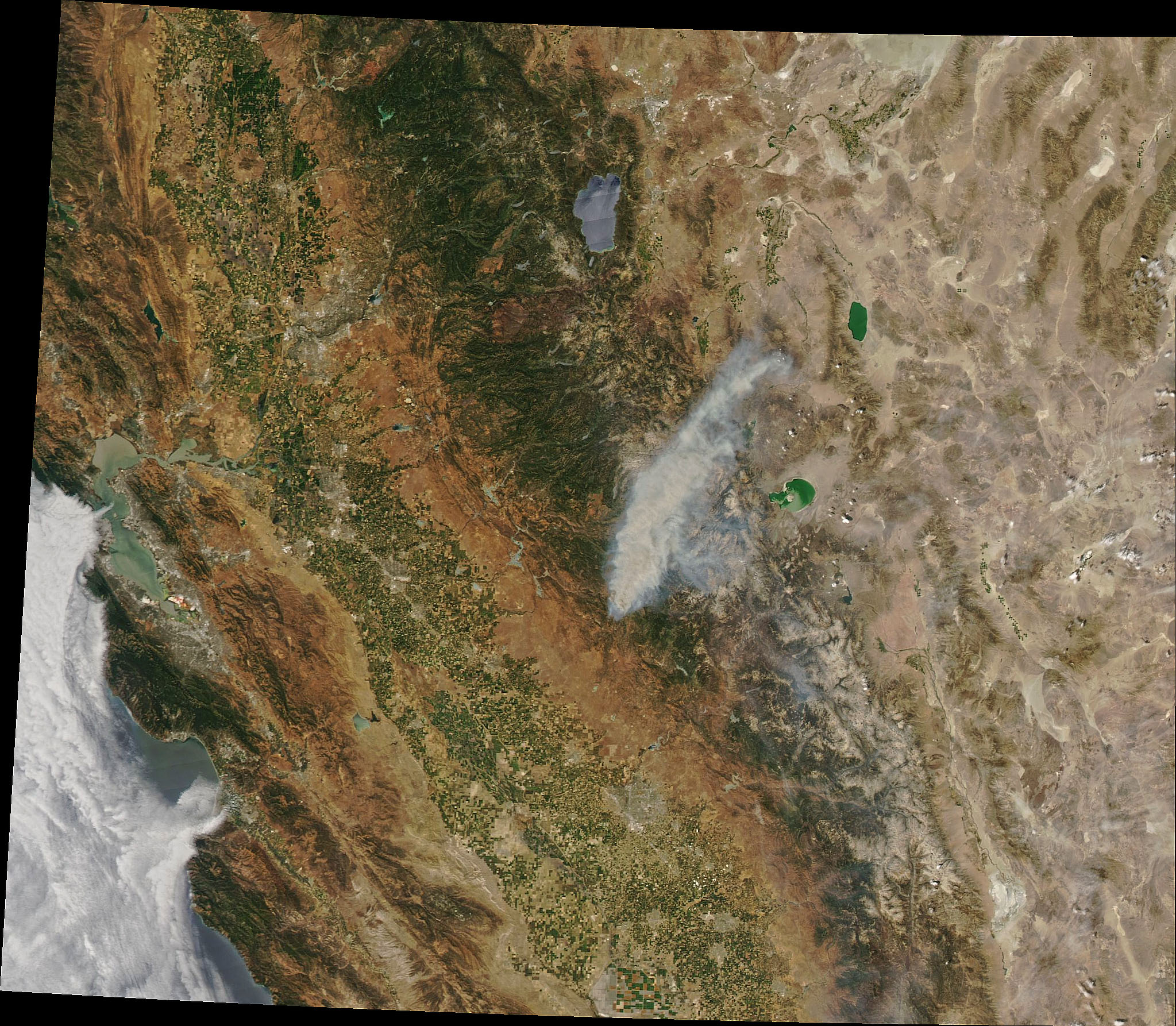
- The smoke plume from the Oak Fire in California as seen by NASA's Aqua satellite on July 23, 2022
- Date: January 21 – October 23

Statistics
- Total fires: 7,477
- Total area: 331,358 acres (134,096 ha)

Impacts
- Deaths: 9
- Structures destroyed: 772 destroyed; 104 damaged

Map
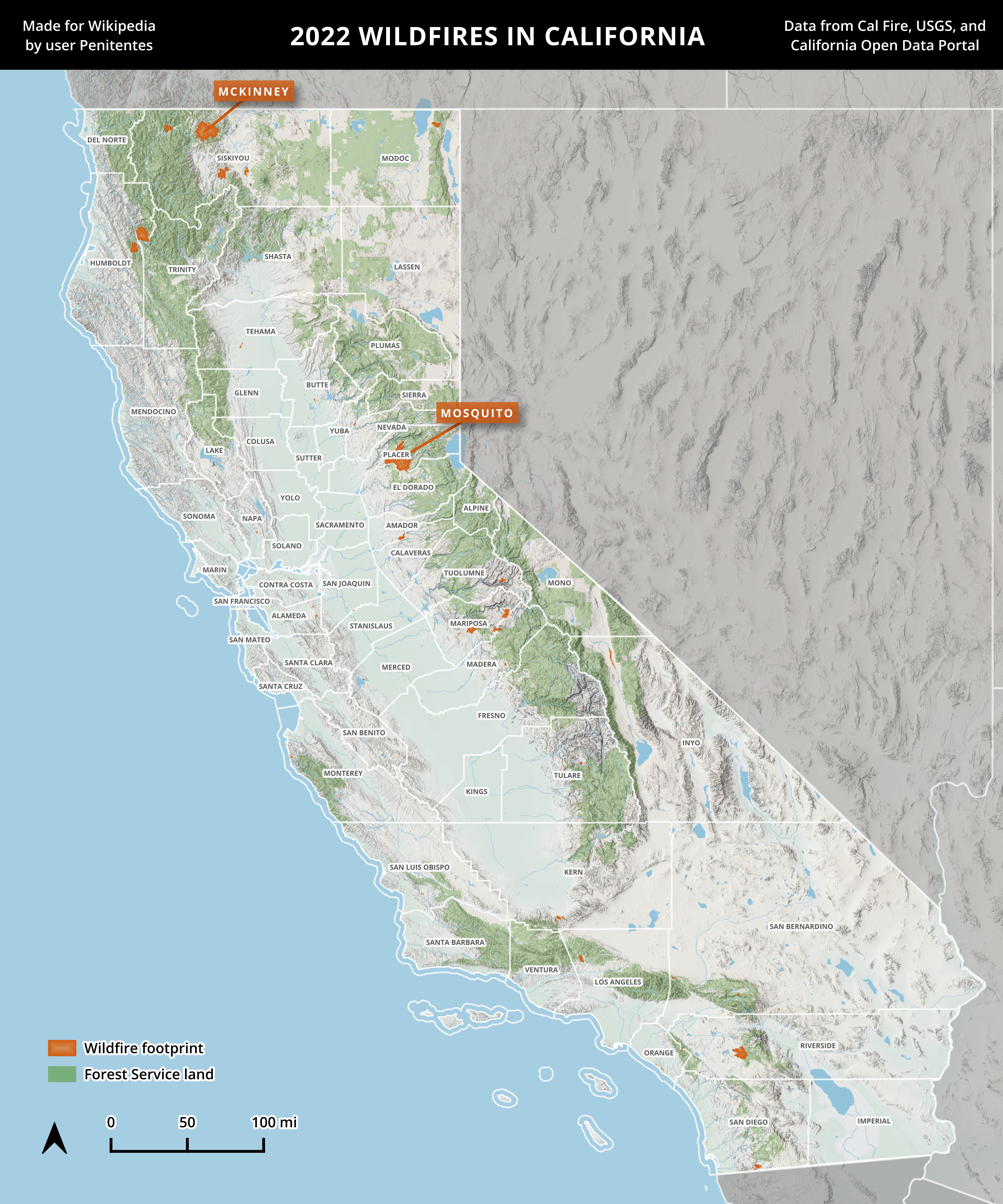
- A map of every wildfire ≥1,000 acres in area in California in 2022

By the end of the year, a total of 7,477 wildfires had been recorded throughout the U.S. state of California, totaling approximately 331,358 acres (134,096 hectares) across the state. Wildfires killed nine people in California in 2022, destroyed 772 structures, and damaged another 104. The 2020 and 2021 wildfire seasons had the highest and second-highest (respectively) numbers of acres burned in the historical record, with a sharp drop in acreage burned.

Drastic climatic and ecological conditions, including climate change and long-term drought, had led to the anticipation of another potentially above-average wildfire season on the heels of two previous such seasons in 2020 and 2021. However, while the number of fires to date in 2022 was only slightly below the 5-year average (7,641 fires versus 8,049 fires), the total acreage burned was well below the 5-year average; 363,939 acres burned in 2022 thus far versus the 5-year average of 2,324,096 acres (though that average includes several of California's most significant fire seasons).

Peak fire season in California typically occurs in late summer and/or fall, and effectively ends when significant precipitation occurs across the state. Governor of California Gavin Newsom officially marked "the end of peak wildfire season” in most of the state in mid-November. The quieter fire year was received gratefully by state officials and was highlighted by multiple news outlets, which attributed the downturn in severity largely to fortunate weather patterns, such as well-timed precipitation and favorable wind conditions. Officials were also quick to suggest that a contributing factor might have been several billion dollars invested in wildfire resilience projects, such as prescribed burning and community outreach.

Despite the 'quiet' year as measured in acreage, a number of significant wildfires burned in California in 2022; these include the Oak Fire in Mariposa County, which burned over 180 structures, the McKinney Fire in Siskiyou County, which caused 4 fatalities, and the Mosquito Fire in Placer and El Dorado counties, which was California's largest wildfire of the year.

== Background ==
The timing of "fire season" in California is variable, depending on the amount of prior winter and spring precipitation, the frequency and severity of weather such as heat waves and wind events, and moisture content in vegetation. Northern California typically sees wildfire activity between late spring and early fall, peaking in the summer with hotter and drier conditions. Occasional cold frontal passages can bring wind and lightning. The timing of fire season in Southern California is similar, peaking between late spring and fall. The severity and duration of peak activity in either part of the state is modulated in part by weather events: downslope/offshore wind events can lead to critical fire weather, while onshore flow and Pacific weather systems can bring conditions that hamper wildfire growth.

== Early outlook ==
=== Seasonal fire risk ===
After a wet October and December in the beginning of the 2022 water year, California experienced the driest January–February period on record in the state, with similar conditions continuing in March. This dry stretch follows a period of severe drought in the state that began in 2020, in part due to climate change in California, and which contributed to severe wildfire seasons in both 2020 and 2021.

Southern California was dry January and February in nearly 20 years since 2002.

In its April monthly seasonal outlook, the National Interagency Fire Center forecast above normal significant fire potential for the Bay Area, Mid Coast-Mendocino, and Sacramento Valley/Foothill areas beginning in May, due to the lack of seasonal precipitation, early start to the growing season, and long-term drought. It also noted that "A further expansion of above normal significant fire potential is forecast across most elevations during June and July." The Northern California Geographic Coordination Center (commonly called 'North Ops') forecast stated that "Confidence is moderate to high for an early start to the significant large fire season."

In Northern California, peak fire season begins in the early summer (June–July) and runs until late fall, varying year to year. In Southern California, the peak fire season begins in late spring (May–June) and runs until fall. The precise timing varies according to annual and seasonal precipitation, as well as the occurrence of offshore wind events, such as the Santa Anas, Diablo winds, or sundowner winds. However, fires are possible at any time of year in the state, particularly in drier Southern California.

=== Preparation ===
In anticipation of the 2022 California wildfire season, the Pacific Gas and Electric Company (PG&E) increased its planned wildfire mitigation plan spending for 2022 to $5.96 billion, from $4.8 billion in 2021 and $4.46 billion in 2020. The mitigation plan includes the 'undergrounding' of at least 175 miles of power lines in high-fire risk areas, the installation of 98 additional wildfire detection/monitoring cameras and 100 additional weather stations, the expansion of safety settings that cut off power when objects (such as trees or branches) contact power lines, and the continued implementation of public safety power shutoffs (PSPS) as a last resort during extreme fire weather conditions. These moves came after the company declared bankruptcy in 2019 over its liability for wildfire damage costs from the 2018 Camp Fire and 2017 Tubbs Fire, among others. PG&E pleaded guilty to 84 counts of involuntary manslaughter in the Camp Fire, shortly before the company exited bankruptcy in June 2020. In January 2022, Cal Fire determined that the Dixie Fire, the largest fire of the 2021 California wildfire season and largest non-complex fire in recorded California history, was caused by a tree contacting PG&E electrical distribution lines.

=== Firefighter shortages ===
The lead-in to the 2022 Western United States fire season was also marked by concerns about firefighting staffing. On March 15, 2022, Politico reported that United States Forest Service (USFS) officials had warned California employees that there had been "50 percent fewer applications submitted for GS3 through GS9 firefighting positions" compared to 2021, in part because of low pay, housing issues, and high cost of living. The San Francisco Chronicle similarly reported that between 2019 and 2021, the number of U.S. Forest Service firefighters stationed in California dropped by more than 20%, or over 1,000 firefighters. Testifying for the Senate Appropriations Committee on May 4, USFS Chief Randy Moore noted that in some areas, the USFS had only reached 50% of the staffing goal for wildland firefighters so far. Chief Moore cited competition in the labor market, including with private, county, and state organizations, such as Cal Fire, as a major reason for the hiring challenges. During the peak of fire season, representatives of California's private timber industry called for firefighting reserves to be augmented by the U.S. military and the National Guard, but were resisted by federal and state officials who noted the cost of such efforts and the lack of extreme resource needs during the season so far. The state has been forced to seek military assistance in the past during severe fire seasons.

== Causes ==
=== Climate change ===
Anthropogenic climate change is partially responsible for driving increased wildfire severity in California. For instance, background warming has led to weather and vegetation conditions more favorable for wildfire activity even at night, which has typically been a period of reduced activity that allows crews to intensify efforts to suppress fires.

=== Drought ===
The state of California is experiencing drought conditions on a number of timescales. The state saw very little precipitation in the January to March time period, with much of the state experiencing its driest such period. As of March 22, 2022, the National Drought Mitigation Center's U.S. Drought Monitor saw the entire state in moderate to extreme drought conditions. In February, their Drought Severity and Coverage (DSCI) index, which measures cumulative dryness, was at 275, or nearly twice the 20-year average of approximately 146, according to the San Francisco Chronicle. This dry period is part of an ongoing 22-year spell of drought in the North American West that marks the driest such period in at least 1,200 years, according to scientific research based on analysis of soil moisture deficits and tree rings.

The drought has impacted wildfire risk and severity in a number of ways. Increased dryness of fuels, driven by increased vapor pressure deficit (VPD), a measure of the aridity of the atmosphere, is behind an eightfold increase in the area burned by wildfires in the summer in California since 1972, according to scientific research. Drought and overcrowding have also made forests more vulnerable not just to wildfires but bark beetle infestation, which has further weakened and killed forests. Total tree mortality since 2010 exceeds 172 million, providing plentiful fuel for wildfires.

=== Forest management and fire suppression ===
Scientists believe that prior to European colonization, far more area—between 4.4 and 11.8 million acres—was burned on an annual basis in California than in modern history, as a combination of wildfires and indigenous controlled burning. Beginning with the advent of the U.S. Forest Service's '10 AM policy', in which it sought to extinguish all fires by 10 AM the morning after their report, the primary method of wildfire management in California has been suppression. The success of this approach has led to a surfeit of fuel, resulting in larger and more extreme fires.

=== Wildland–urban interface development ===
California, as with other areas of the United States and the world, has experienced a growing amount of human development into the wildland–urban interface, or WUI. This area consists of developed areas either adjacent to, or intermingled with, wildland vegetation and fuels. Such areas are more prone to wildfire ignitions and structure losses, increasing the risk and severity of fire seasons in California. The 2018 Camp Fire and 2017 Tubbs Fire are two examples of recent California wildfires that resulted devastating losses in WUI communities.

== List of wildfires ==
The following is a list of fires that burned more than 1,000 acres (400 ha), produced significant structural damage or casualties, or were otherwise notable. Acreage and containment figures may not be up to date.

| Name | County | Acres | Start date | Containment date (Note: Containment means that fire crews have established and secured control lines around the fire's perimeter. These lines are artificial barriers, like trenches or cleared vegetation, designed to stop the fire's spread, or natural barriers like rivers. Containment reflects progress in managing the fire but does not necessarily mean the fire is starved of fuel, under control, or put out.) | Notes | Ref |
|---|---|---|---|---|---|---|
| Airport Fire | Inyo | 4,136 | February 16, 2022 | February 26, 2022 | Unknown cause | |
| Coastal Fire | Orange | 200 | May 11, 2022 | May 17, 2022 | Unknown cause; burned into a neighborhood and destroyed 20 homes | |
| Lost Lake Fire | Riverside | 5,856 | May 26, 2022 | June 8, 2022 | Unknown cause | |
| Thunder Fire | Kern | 2,500 | June 22, 2022 | June 27, 2022 | Likely caused by lightning strike | |
| Roblar Fire | Sonoma | 63 | June 27, 2022 | June 27, 2022 | Unknown cause; 1 fatality from person trapped in a vehicle | |
| Rices Fire | Nevada | 904 | June 28, 2022 | July 5, 2022 | Caused by a structure fire that spread into vegetation; threatened 520 structures and destroyed 4 structures | |
| Electra Fire | Amador, Calaveras | 4,478 | July 4, 2022 | July 28, 2022 | Unknown cause, possibly fireworks from Fourth of July celebrations | |
| Washburn Fire | Mariposa, Madera | 4,886 | July 7, 2022 | July 30, 2022 | Human caused, forced evacuations in Wawona and trail closures in Yosemite National Park; threatened Mariposa Grove | |
| Oak Fire | Mariposa | 19,244 | July 22, 2022 | September 2, 2022 | Unknown cause, forced evacuations in Mariposa County. Destroyed 182 structures and damaged 10 structures | |
| McKinney Fire | Siskiyou | 60,138 | July 29, 2022 | September 7, 2022 | Possibly caused by power lines; destroyed 185 structures and caused 4 fatalities | |
| Yeti Fire | Siskiyou | 7,886 | July 29, 2022 | September 1, 2022 | Probable lightning caused, forced evacuations in Siskiyou County, originally named the China 2 fire | |
| Summit Fire | Tulare | 1,394 | August 3, 2022 | October 31, 2022 | Caused by lightning, was suppressed using indirect methods, burning in southern Sequoia National Park | |
| Red Fire | Mariposa, Madera | 8,364 | August 4, 2022 | September 28, 2022 | Lightning caused, burned in Yosemite National Park, not fully suppressed due to natural barriers | |
| Six Rivers Lightning Complex | Humboldt, Trinity | 41,596 | August 5, 2022 | November 3, 2022 | Caused mandatory evacuations in Trinity and Humboldt counties, composed of multiple lightning fires that eventually merged into the Campbell Fire and Ammon Fire | |
| Rodgers Fire | Tuolumne | 2,790 | August 8, 2022 | September 26, 2022 | Lightning caused, burned in Yosemite National Park, not fully suppressed due to natural barriers | |
| Route Fire | Los Angeles | 5,208 | August 31, 2022 | September 7, 2022 | Burned near Interstate 5 and Castaic Lake, 1 structure destroyed and 7 firefighters injured | |
| Border 32 Fire | San Diego | 4,456 | August 31, 2022 | September 5, 2022 | Burned near U.S./Mexico border, 10 structures destroyed | |
| Mill Fire | Siskiyou | 3,935 | September 2, 2022 | September 13, 2022 | Burned in/near communities of Weed and Lake Shastina, destroyed 118 structures, caused 2 fatalities | |
| Mountain Fire | Siskiyou | 13,440 | September 2, 2022 | September 21, 2022 | Burned 7 miles SW of Gazelle, 4 structures destroyed | |
| Radford Fire | San Bernardino | 1,079 | September 2, 2022 | September 30, 2022 | Burned near Big Bear Lake, has caused evacuations in the region | |
| Fairview Fire | Riverside | 28,307 | September 5, 2022 | October 5, 2022 | Burned near Hemet, caused 2 fatalities and destroyed 36 structures | |
| Mosquito Fire | Placer, El Dorado | 76,788 | September 6, 2022 | October 23, 2022 | Burned near Foresthill and caused evacuations in Placer and El Dorado County; destroyed 78 structures | |
| Barnes Fire | Modoc | 5,843 | September 7, 2022 | October 13, 2022 | Caused by lightning, burned near Fort Bidwell in the Warner Mountains | |
| Fork Fire | Madera | 819 | September 7, 2022 | September 13, 2022 | Caused by a vehicle, destroyed 43 structures near North Fork | |

== Gallery of maps ==
Maps of significant wildfires in 2022 in California

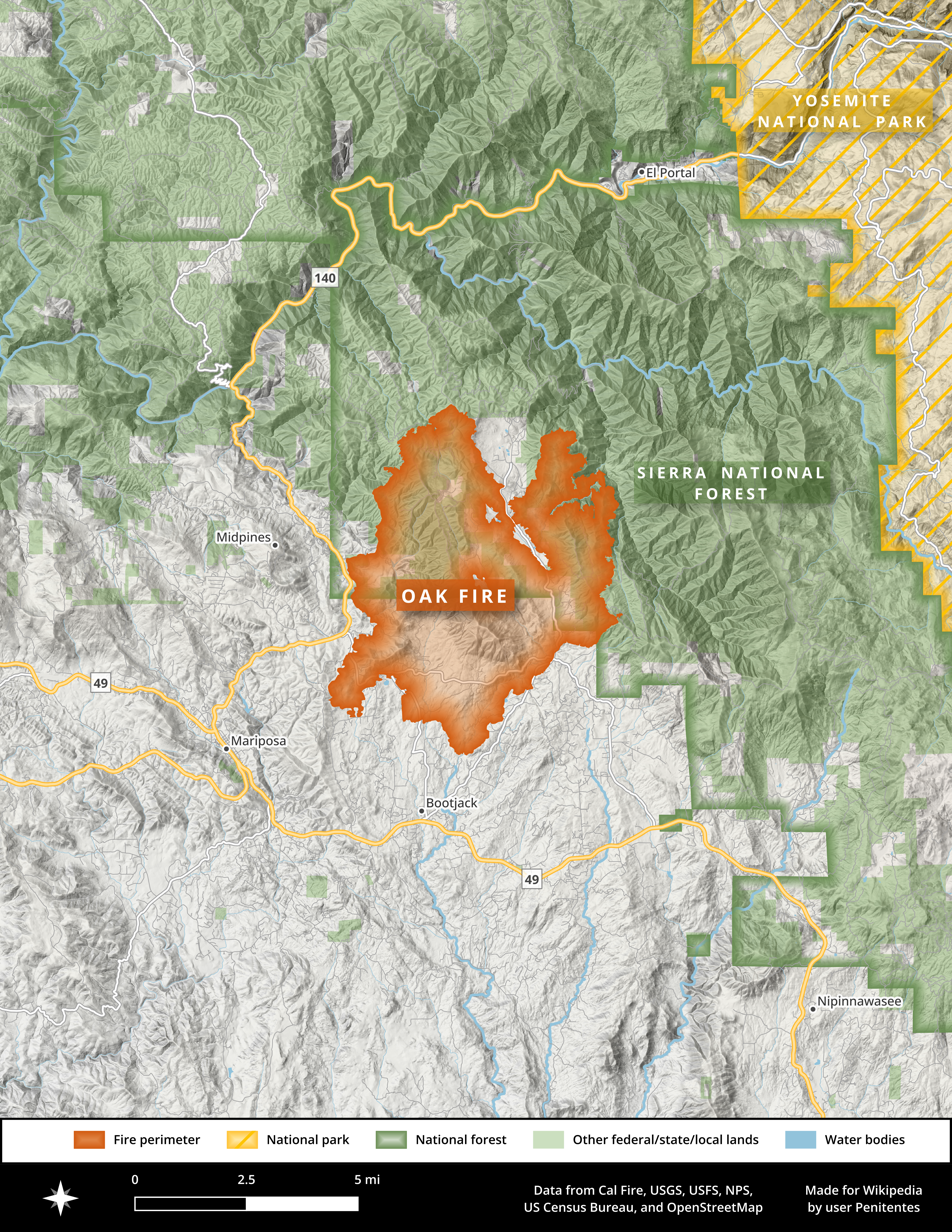
Oak Fire

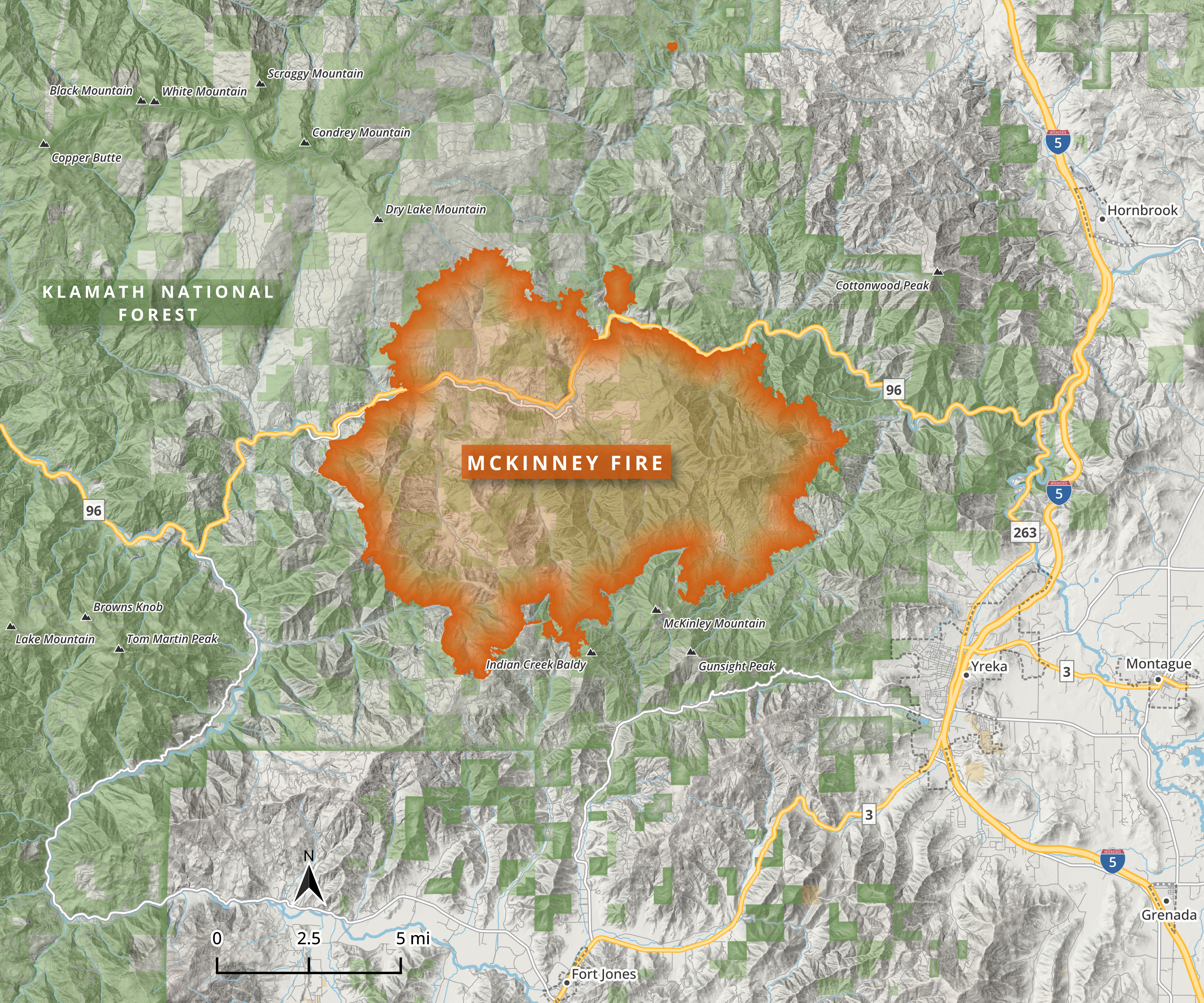
McKinney Fire

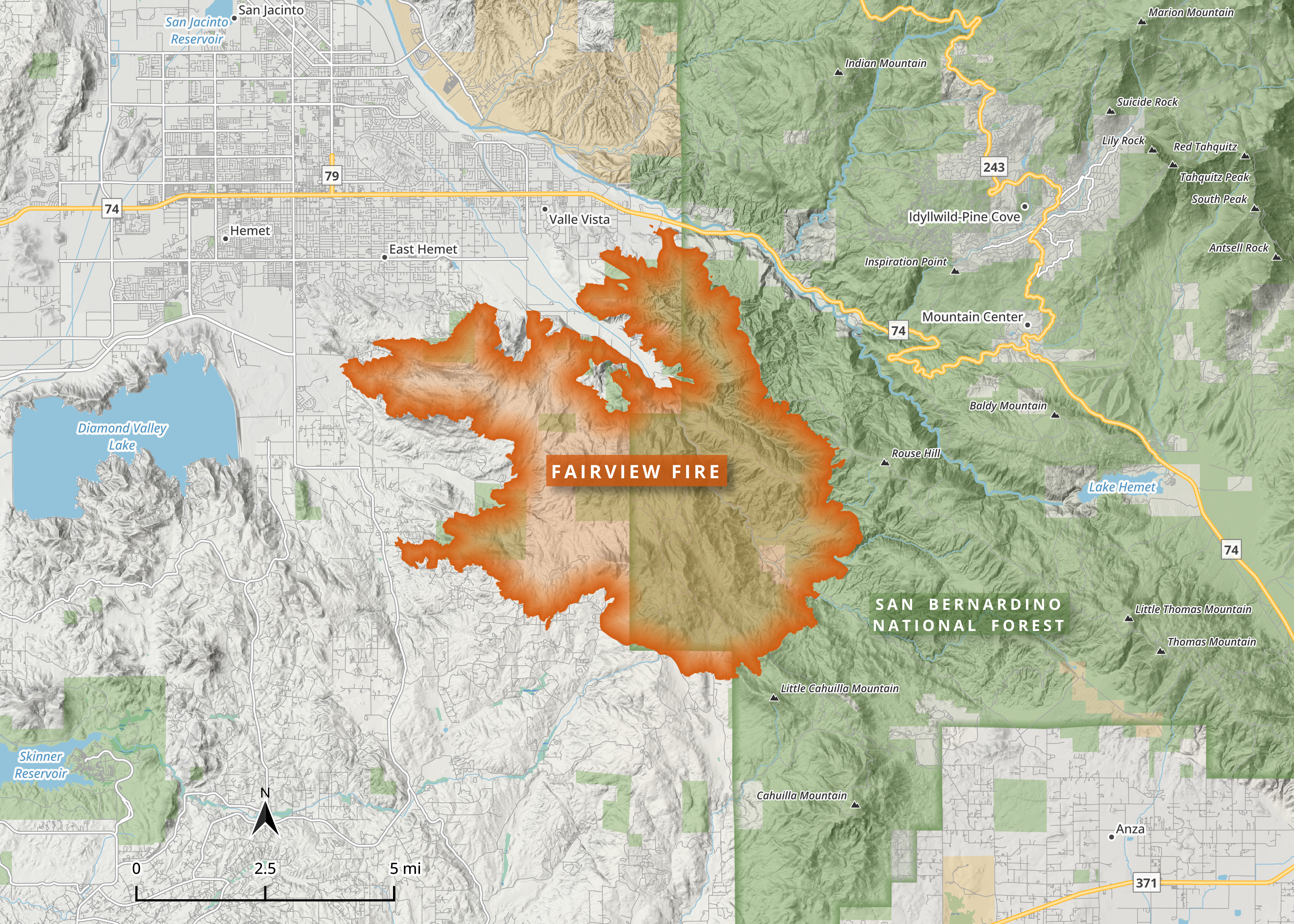
Fairview Fire

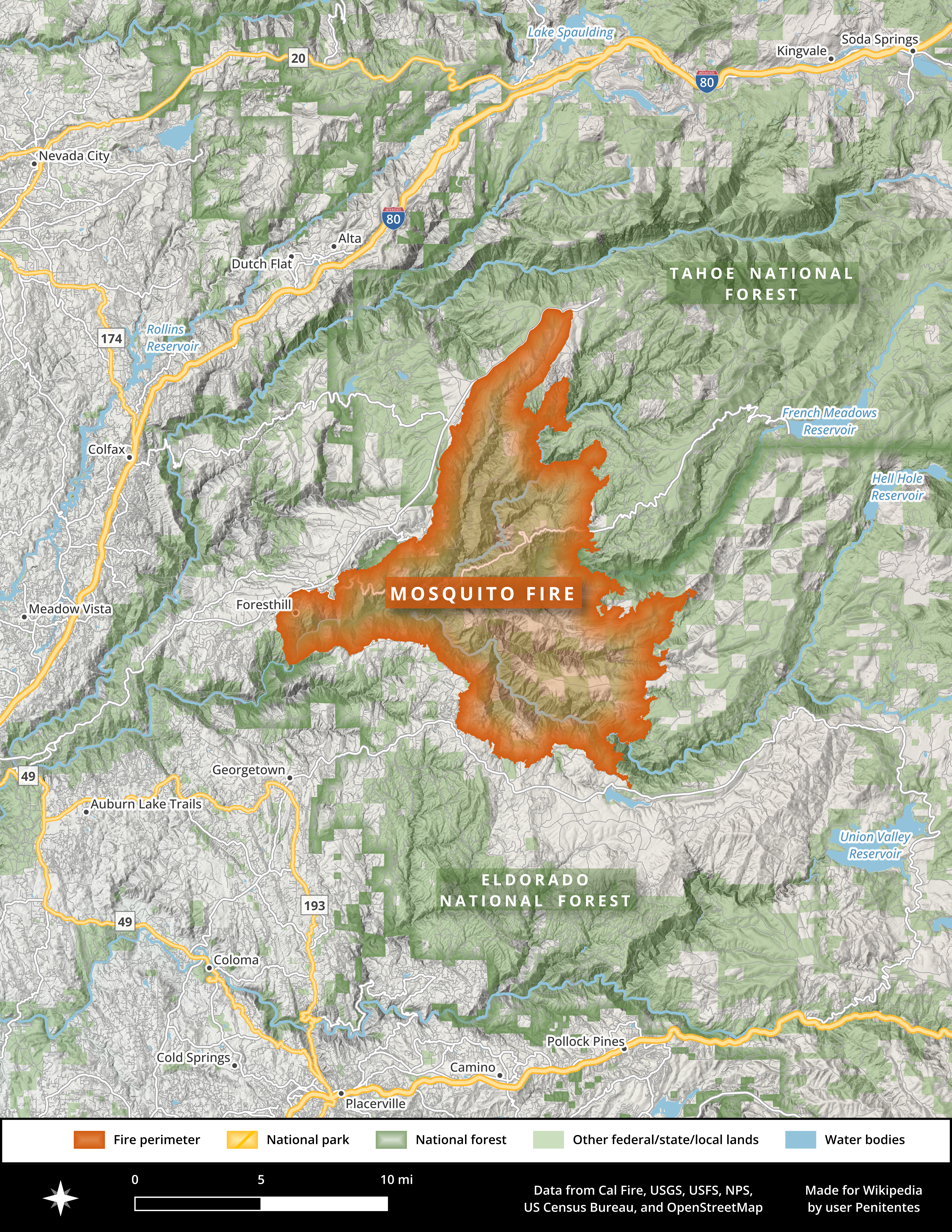
Mosquito Fire

== See also ==
- List of California wildfires
- 2022 Arizona wildfires
- 2022 Colorado wildfires
- 2022 New Mexico wildfires
- 2022 Oregon wildfires
- 2022 Washington wildfires
