= Electra Fire (2022) =

2022 wildfire in Northern California

- Part of the 2022 California wildfires
- Date: July 4, 2022 –; July 28, 2022
- Coordinates: 38.334802°N 120.665415°W

Statistics
- Burned area: 4,478 acres (1,812 ha)

Impacts
- Deaths: 0
- Injuries: 1 firefighter
- Evacuated: ~100

Ignition
- Cause: Under investigation

Map
- Location within California

The Electra Fire was a wildfire that burned northeast of Mokelumne Hill in Amador and Calaveras Counties, California that started on July 4, 2022. The wildfire burned a total of 4,478 acres (1,812 ha) and was fully contained on July 28, 2022.

== Background ==
In the immediate impact zone of the Electra Fire, the historic September 2015 Butte Fire destroyed much of native vegetation throughout the canyons the Electra Fire would later burn in. The Butte Fire was a significant, deadly and destructive wildfire ignited when a tree branch came in contact with a Pacific Gas & Electric Company powerline. The Butte Fire would later grow to 70,868 acres, destroyed 877 homes and businesses and damage 44 more—as well as lead to the deaths of two civilians. By contrast, the Electra Fire—while still growing to a significant 4,478 acres—was far less destructive.

== Progression ==
The Electra Fire ignited at 6:42 pm PDT and rapidly grew at the site of a recreation area, forcing 85 to 100 nearby civilians celebrating the Independence Day holiday at a river to shelter in place at a PG&E facility as the fire passed through the area. The crowd of roughly 100 people was safely evacuated from the facility later that night. Immediate Mandatory evacuation orders and warnings were put in place which combined affected about 500 people in Amador County and 300 to 400 people in Calaveras County. The fire—dubbed the Electra Fire due to its ignition source being close in proximity to Electra Road along the North Fork of the Mokelumne River and Vaught's Beach—was first reported at 75 acres in size and burning at a dangerous rate of spread in dry grass had ballooned to 959 acres in size by 7 pm.

Over 1,300 firefighting personnel were ordered to contain the inferno and by 10 pm, fire activity had relatively diminished allowing crews to conduct controlled burns as a form of containment for the fire. Throughout the night, the fire grew an additional 2,000 acres in size to some 3,034 acres by morning time the next day with containment remaining at zero percent.
