= Oak Fire (2022) =

2022 wildfire in Central California

- Part of the 2022 California wildfires
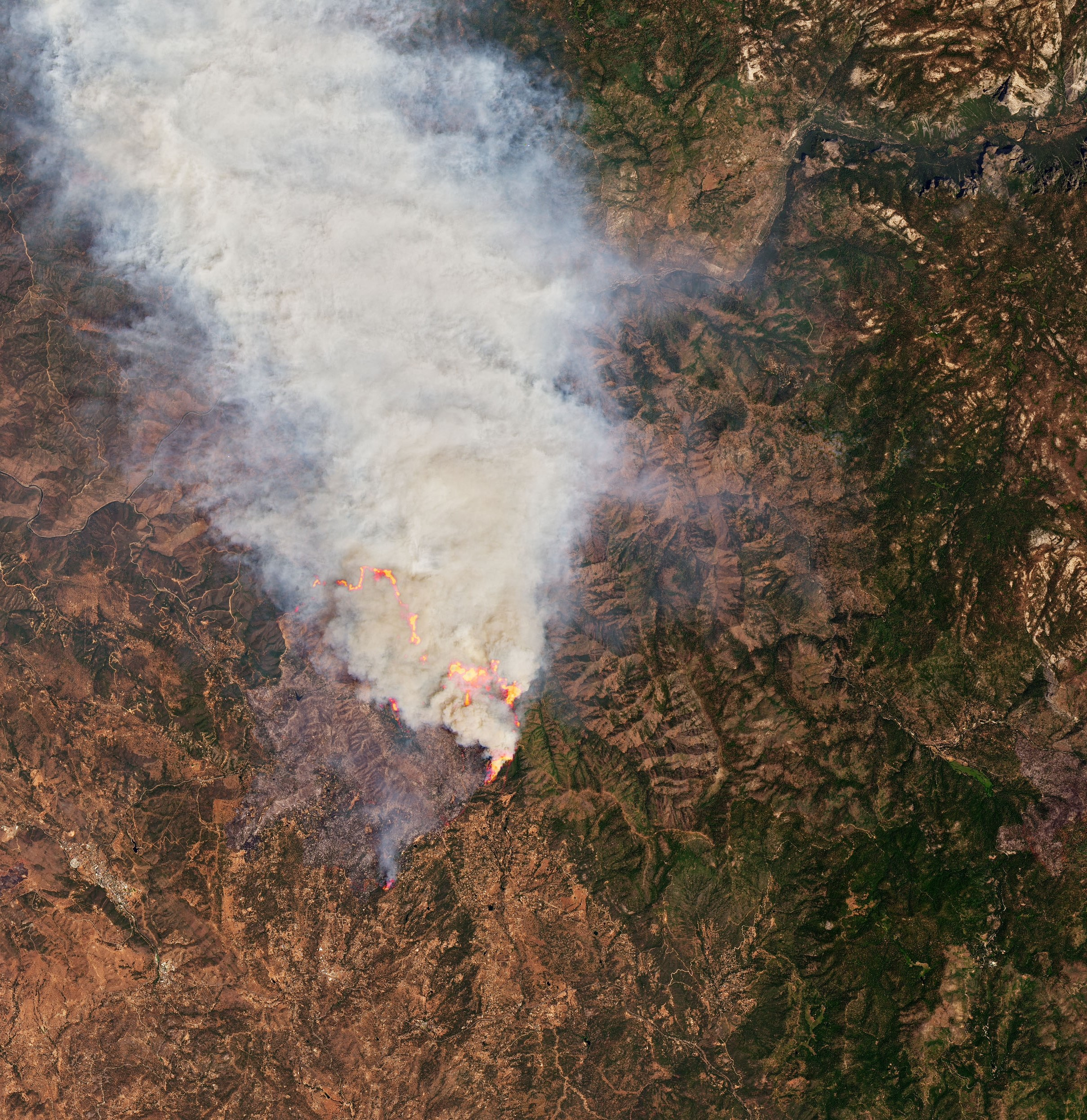
- A NASA image using infrared data shows the Oak Fire burning on July 24, 2022—Yosemite Valley is in the upper right corner and the Washburn Fire to the middle right
- Date: July 22 –; September 2, 2022; (43 days)
- Location: Mariposa County, Central California, United States
- Coordinates: 37.5509366°N 119.9234728°W

Statistics
- Burned area: 19,244 acres (7,788 ha; 30 sq mi; 78 km^{2})

Impacts
- Deaths: 0
- Injuries: ≥3
- Evacuated: >6,000
- Structures destroyed: 193
- Cost: >$108.3 million

Ignition
- Cause: Arson

Map
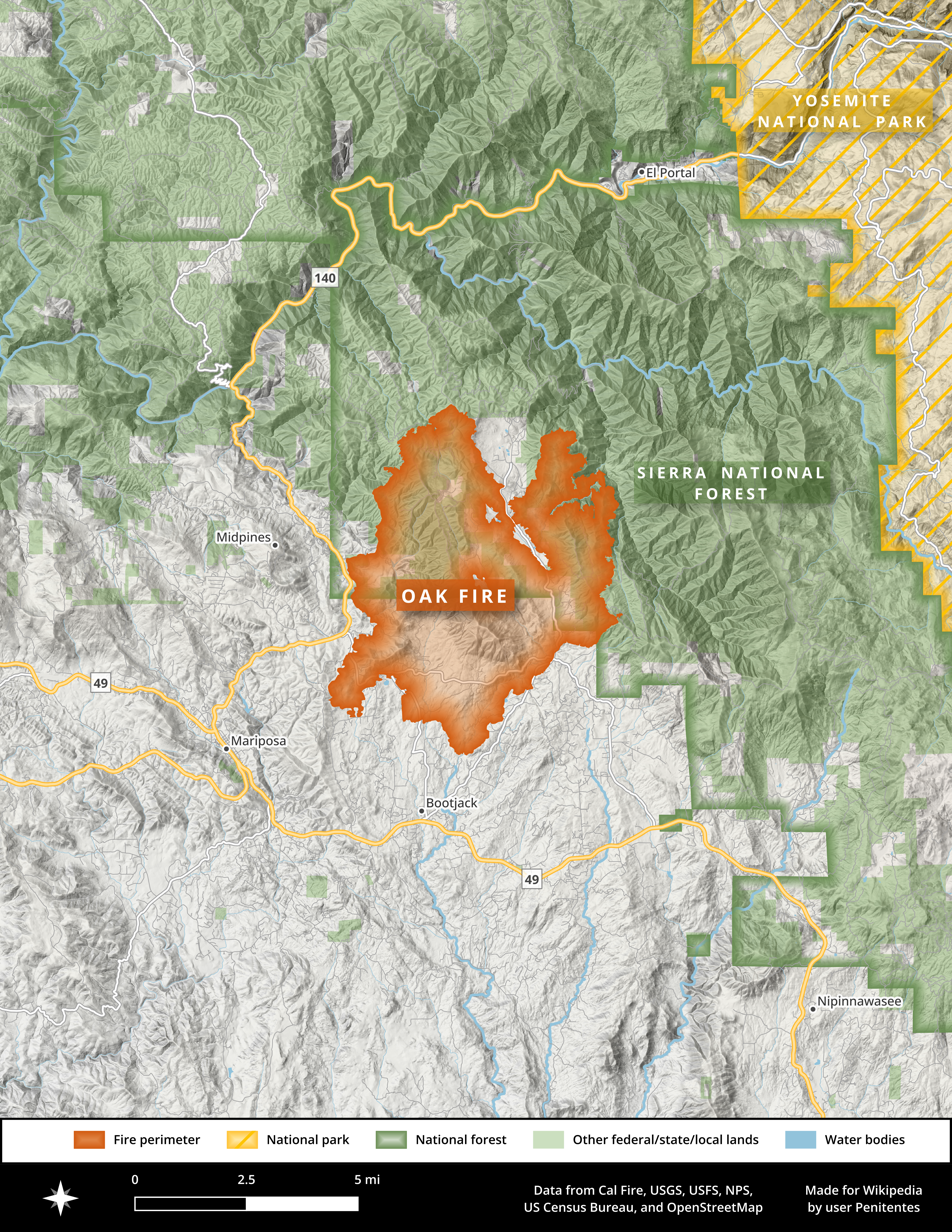
- The footprint of the Oak Fire, west of Yosemite National Park, with other recent wildfire history

- Location of Oak Fire in California

The Oak Fire was a destructive wildfire in Mariposa County and the Sierra National Forest in Central California during the 2022 California wildfire season. The fire was reported on July 22, 2022, and burned 19,244 acres (7,788 ha) before being fully contained on September 2, 2022. On June 16, 2023, a 71-year-old man was arrested on suspicion of arson for starting the fire.

== Background ==
The Oak Fire started amid a prolonged and intense drought. Sixty percent of California fell under extreme drought conditions, which particularly affected the region of the Oak Fire—a meteorologist with the National Weather Service office in Hanford noted that the area's drought indices were the driest in all the Sierra Nevada. Scientific research suggested that the drought was exacerbated by climate change-caused temperature increases. When the fire began, hot and dry conditions prevailed over the region: according to the National Weather Service temperatures were in the low or mid-90s °F and relative humidity levels hovered around eight or nine percent. Additionally, the prior years of drought had created a "tremendous" load of fuel, with dry vegetation and many dead trees.

== Progression ==
The Oak Fire ignited at about 2:10 p.m. PDT on Friday, July 22, in the community of Midpines, near the intersection of Highway 140 and Carstens Road. State fire officials characterized the fire's behavior as "extreme". A pyrocumulus cloud created by the fire reached 20,000 feet in height and could be seen from as far away as Reno, Nevada. The fire spread quickly, in part due to long-range ember spotting up to two miles (3.2 km) ahead of the main fire front. The fire burned through the footprint of the 2013 Carstens Fire.

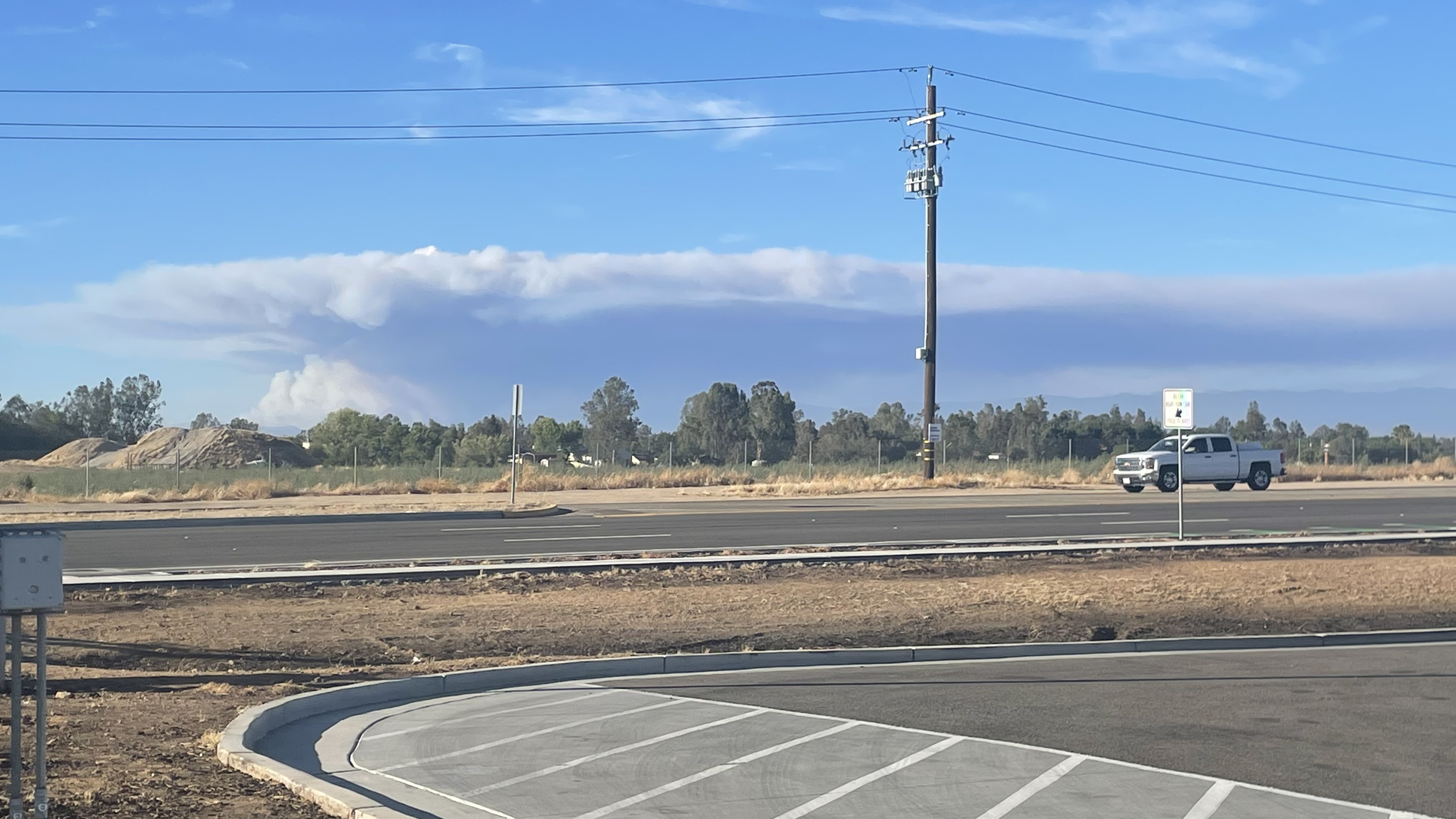
The smoke plume from the Oak Fire, seen from a truck stop in Madera Acres on July 22

At around 9:00 p.m., the Mariposa County Sheriff's Office ordered more evacuations, including all of Jerseydale and homes on many nearby roads. About thirty minutes later, the fire jumped Triangle and Silva Roads. By 11:00 p.m. the fire had burned an estimated 4,350 acres (1,760 ha) and was zero percent contained, nine hours after igniting.

On July 23, 2022, Governor of California Gavin Newsom declared a state of emergency in Mariposa County as a result of the fire.

By the morning of July 24, the third day of the fire, 2,093 personnel were battling the fire, according to Cal Fire. This included 17 helicopters, 225 fire engines, and 58 bulldozers to create firebreaks.

The fire's progression to the east, towards Yosemite National Park, was impeded by the burn scar of the 2018 Ferguson Fire.

The fire was declared 100 percent contained on September 2. The total cost of Cal Fire's fire suppression effort reached more than $100 million.

== Cause ==
Following an 11-month investigation, on Friday, June 16, 2023, a 71-year-old resident of Mariposa County Edward Frederick Wackerman was arrested on suspicion of starting the Oak Fire. The news was announced on the following Tuesday, June 20, 2023. Wackerman was charged with multiple felonies, including "aggravated arson and arson that caused great bodily injury". The investigation that resulted in Wackerman's arrest involved the FBI, the National Park Service's law enforcement division, and Cal Fire. Authorities did not describe a method or motive for the arson, though Mariposa County sheriff Jeremy Briese did disclose that he believed Wackerman had previously been employed as a firefighter.

Authorities believe that Wackerman set three other fires in July 2022 before setting the Oak Fire.

Wackerman was released on electronic monitoring December 8th 2025

== Effects ==
The Oak Fire caused no fatalities, though at least three firefighters were injured. The fire destroyed 193 structures, including 127 single-family residences and 66 outbuildings. Another 10 structures were damaged, including six homes and four outbuildings. Property damages totaled an additional $8.3 million on top of the >$100 million cost of the firefighting effort. The Los Angeles Times called the Oak Fire the worst wildfire in the history of Mariposa County, and the fire chief for Merced County named it as one of the most devastating.

The fire affected the Southern Sierra Miwuk Nation, a federally unrecognized Native American tribe indigenous to the region. The fire damaged cultural sites such as roundhouses and displaced tribe members.

=== Closures and evacuations ===
The Oak Fire threatened multiple communities in rural Mariposa County, including Lushmeadows, Midpines, Jerseydale, and Bootjack. The number of people under evacuation orders on July 23, the day after the fire's ignition, reached more than 6,000. An evacuation center was established at New Life Christian Fellowship church, but continued rapid fire spread forced officials to move it to Mariposa Elementary School, where more than 100 people checked in and almost half of that group chose to spend the night on July 24. Local hotels quickly filled with evacuees even as the normal crowd of weekend Yosemite tourists canceled their stays. More than 3,100 homes and businesses serviced by Pacific Gas & Electric (PG&E) lost power. The fire forced the U.S. Forest Service to close parts of the Sierra National Forest to the public. Yosemite National Park remained largely unaffected by the fire, but part of Highway 140—one of the main access roads for the park—closed. Some Mariposa County government offices closed to public walk-in. Electricity was restored to all customers and all road closures and evacuation orders were lifted by August 4.

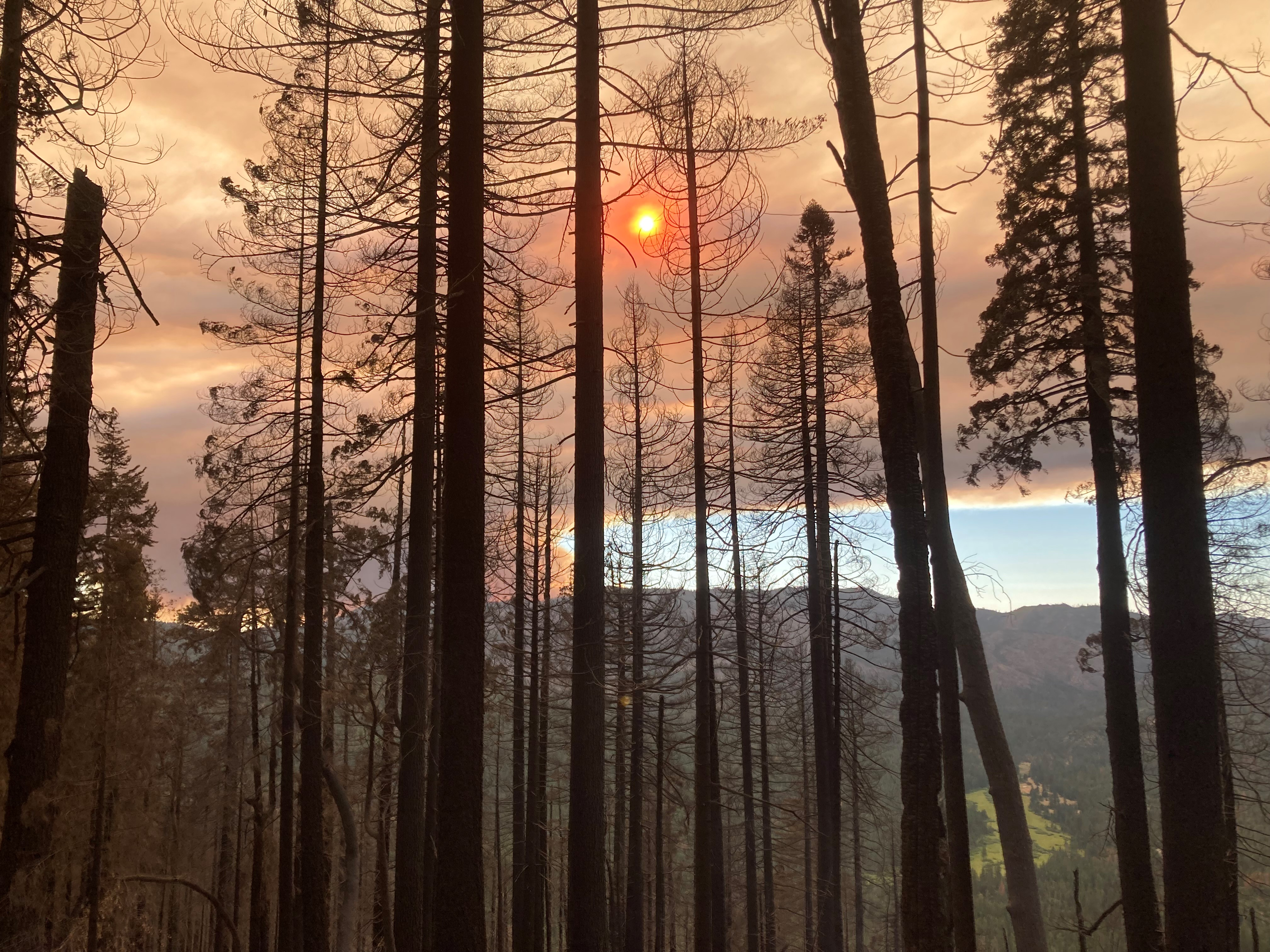
Smoke generated by the Oak Fire as seen from the Washburn Fire on July 22

Some residents of Mariposa County expressed concerns regarding the presence and participation of uniformed militia members during evacuation efforts, prompting the Mariposa Sheriff's Office to clarify that they had not activated the militia.

=== Environmental impacts ===
Smoke from the Oak Fire spread widely, causing authorities to issue air quality advisories even in distant areas, such as Barstow and the Victor Valley. Prevailing winds pushed smoke northeast, prompting air quality warnings for multiple days in a row for western Nevada. In parts of the Sierra Nevada such as the Lake Tahoe Basin, where the smoke was particularly thick, it caused poor visibility and the air quality indices reached unhealthy to hazardous levels.

== Growth and containment status ==
Fire containment status Gray: contained; Red: active; %: percent contained
Date	Total area burned	Personnel	Containment
Jul 22	4,350 acres (1,760 ha)	383 personnel	
Jul 23	11,900 acres (4,816 ha)	2,093 personnel	
Jul 24	15,603 acres (6,314 ha)	2,548 personnel	
Jul 25	17,241 acres (6,977 ha)	2,991 personnel	
Jul 26	18,532 acres (7,500 ha)	3,051 personnel	
Jul 27	18,824 acres (7,618 ha)	3,758 personnel	
Jul 28	19,191 acres (7,766 ha)	3,758 personnel	
Jul 29	19,221 acres (7,778 ha)	3,939 personnel	
Jul 30	19,244 acres (7,788 ha)	3,788 personnel	
Jul 31	19,244 acres (7,788 ha)	3,613 personnel	
Aug 1	19,244 acres (7,788 ha)	3,613 personnel	
Aug 2	19,244 acres (7,788 ha)	2,806 personnel	
Aug 3	19,244 acres (7,788 ha)	2,621 personnel	
Aug 4	19,244 acres (7,788 ha)	1,783 personnel	
Aug 5	19,244 acres (7,788 ha)	1,783 personnel	
Aug 6	19,244 acres (7,788 ha)	641 personnel	
Aug 7	19,244 acres (7,788 ha)	564 personnel	
Aug 8	19,244 acres (7,788 ha)	597 personnel	
Aug 9	19,244 acres (7,788 ha)	514 personnel	
Aug 10	19,244 acres (7,788 ha)	514 personnel	
...	...	...	...
Sep 2	19,244 acres (7,788 ha)	...	

== See also ==
- 2022 California wildfires
- Washburn Fire, another 2022 wildfire in Mariposa County in Yosemite National Park
