= List of places in California (V) =

List of places in California - V

This list of current:

- cities
- towns, unincorporated communities
- counties, and other recognized places in the U.S. state of California.

Information on the number and names of counties in which the place lies, and its lower and upper ZIP Code bounds, if applicable are also included.

Name of place	Number of counties	Principal county	Lower zip code	Upper zip code
Vacation	1	Sonoma County	95446	
Vacation Beach	1	Sonoma County		
Vaca Valley	1	Solano County		
Vacaville	1	Solano County	95688	
Vacaville Junction	1	Solano County		
Vade	1	El Dorado County	95721	
Valdez	1	Yolo County		
Vale	1	Solano County		
Valencia	1	Los Angeles County	91354	91355
Valencia	1	Orange County		
Valerie	1	Riverside County	92274	
Valinda	1	Los Angeles County	91744	
Valjean	1	San Bernardino County		
Valla	1	Los Angeles County		
Vallecito	1	Calaveras County	95251	
Vallejo	1	Solano County	94589	92
Vallemar	1	San Mateo County	94044	
Valleton	1	Monterey County		
Valle Vista	1	Alameda County	94541	
Valle Vista	1	Contra Costa County		
Valle Vista	1	Riverside County	92544	
Valley Acres	1	Kern County	93268	
Valley Center	1	San Diego County	92082	
Valleydale	1	Los Angeles County	91702	
Valley Fair	1	Santa Clara County	95128	
Valley Ford	1	Sonoma County	94972	
Valley Home	1	Stanislaus County	95384	
Valley of Enchantment	1	San Bernardino County	92325	
Valley of the Moon	1	San Bernardino County	92325	
Valley Plaza	1	Los Angeles County	91606	
Valley Ranch	1	Plumas County		
Valley Spring	1	Calaveras County		
Valley Springs	1	Calaveras County	95252	
Valley View Park	1	San Bernardino County	92325	
Valley Village	1	Los Angeles County	91607	
Valley Wells	1	San Bernardino County	92366	
Valley Wells Station	1	San Bernardino County		
Valona	1	Contra Costa County	94525	
Valpico	1	San Joaquin County		
Val Verde	1	Los Angeles County		
Val Verde	1	Riverside County	91384	
Val Verde Park	1	Los Angeles County	91350	
Valyermo	1	Los Angeles County	93563	
Van Allen	1	San Joaquin County	95320	
Vance	1	Tulare County		
Vanden	1	Solano County	95688	
Vandenberg	1	Santa Barbara County		
Vandenberg Air Force Base	1	Santa Barbara County	93437	
Vandenberg Village	1	Santa Barbara County	93436	
Vanderbilt	1	San Bernardino County		
Van Duzen	1	Humboldt County	95526	
Vann	1	Lake County		
Van Ness	1	Los Angeles County		
Van Nuys	1	Los Angeles County	91401	11
Vanowen	1	Los Angeles County	91405	
Van Vleck	1	El Dorado County		
Vasona	1	Santa Clara County		
Vasona Junction	1	Santa Clara County		
Vecino	1	Butte County		
Vega	1	Los Angeles County		
Vejar	1	Los Angeles County	91766	91768
Venado	1	Sonoma County		
Venice	1	Los Angeles County	90291	99
Venida	1	Tulare County		
Venta	1	Orange County		
Ventucopa	1	Santa Barbara County	93252	
Ven-tu Park	1	Ventura County	91360	
Ventura	1	Ventura County	93001	09
Ventura Junction	1	Ventura County		
Verano	1	Sonoma County		
Verde	1	San Luis Obispo County		
Verdemont	1	San Bernardino County	92402	
Verdi Sierra Pines	1	Sierra County	89439	
Verdugo City	1	Los Angeles County	91046	
Verdugo Viejo	1	Los Angeles County	91206	
Verdugo Woodlands	1	Los Angeles County		
Vernalis	1	San Joaquin County	95385	
Vernon	1	Los Angeles County	90058	
Verona	1	Sutter County	95659	
Verona Landing	1	Sutter County	95659	
Vestal	1	Tulare County		
Veterans Administration	1	Los Angeles County	90073	
Veterans Home	1	Napa County	94599	
Vichy Springs	1	Mendocino County	95482	
Vichy Springs	1	Napa County		
Victor	1	San Joaquin County	95253	
Victoria Court	1	Santa Barbara County	93101	
Victoria Park	1	Los Angeles County	90247	
Victorville	1	San Bernardino County	92392	95
Victory Center	1	Los Angeles County	91606	
Victory Center Annex	1	Los Angeles County	91606	
Victory Plams	1	Riverside County		
Vidal	1	San Bernardino County	92280	
Vidal	1	San Bernardino County	92225	
Vidal Junction	1	San Bernardino County	92280	
Viejas Rancheria	1	San Diego County	92001	
View Park	1	Los Angeles County	90043	
View Park-Windsor Hills	1	Los Angeles County		
Vignolo	1	Orange County		
Viking	1	Los Angeles County	90808	
Village	1	Santa Clara County	95070	
Villa Grande	1	Sonoma County	95486	
Villa Park	1	Orange County	92861	
Villa Verona	1	Butte County	95965	
Villinger	1	San Joaquin County		
Vina	1	Tehama County	96092	
Vina Vista	1	San Bernardino County		
Vincent	1	Los Angeles County	93550	
Vineburg	1	Sonoma County	95487	
Vine Hill	1	Contra Costa County	94553	
Vineyard	1	Sacramento County		
Vinton	1	Plumas County	96135	
Vinvale	1	Los Angeles County	90280	
Viola	1	Shasta County	96088	
Virgilia	1	Plumas County	95984	
Virginia Colony	1	Ventura County	93021	
Virginiatown	1	Placer County		
Virner	1	El Dorado County	95634	
Visalia	1	Tulare County	93277	92
Visitacion	1	San Francisco County	94134	
Vista	1	San Diego County	92081	84
Vista del Mar	1	Los Angeles County		
Vista del Mar	1	Orange County	92672	
Vista del Morro	1	San Luis Obispo County	93401	
Vista Grande	1	San Mateo County	94014	
Vista La Mesa	1	San Diego County	92041	
Vista Park	1	Kern County	93307	
Vista Santa Rosa	1	San Bernardino County	92392	
Volcano	1	Amador County	95689	
Volcanoville	1	El Dorado County	95634	
Vollmers	1	Shasta County		
Volta	1	Merced County	93635	
Vorden	1	Sacramento County	95690	
