= Valona =

Valona may refer to:

- Vlorë, Albania

- Principality of Valona (1346–1417), a medieval state centered around Vlorë

- Valona, California, United States
- Valona, Georgia, United States
- Valona (song), Mexican poetry and song style
