= Virgilia (disambiguation) =

Virgilia may refer to:

- Virgilia, the wife of Coriolanus in Shakespeare's play Coriolanus
- Virgilia, California, an unincorporated community
- Virgilia, the wife of the Roman general Gaius Marcius Coriolanus
- Virgilia (plant), a genus of South African trees in the family Fabaceae
- Virgilia (bug), a genus of true bugs in the family Lophopidae
- Virgilia (ship, 1918), a ship of the Cunard line that smashed into the Thames barge Kathleen of Greenwich in 1923
- A common name for Cladrastis kentukea, a tree of eastern North America
- Virgilia, character of 07th Expansion Sound Novel Umineko no Naku Koro ni
- Virgilia Hazard, a fictitious abolitionist character in the popular TV mini-series North and South
