= Dueto América =

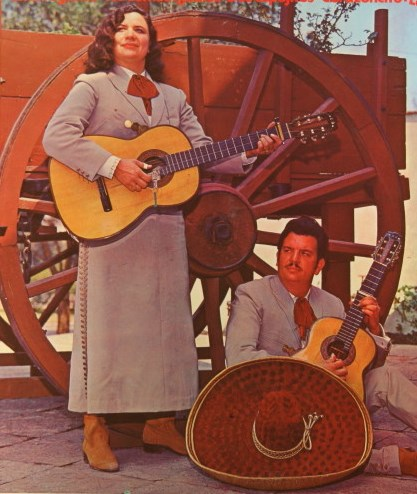

Background information
- Origin: Aguascalientes, Aguascalientes, Mexico
- Genres: Ranchera, corrido
- Labels: Columbia Records, Harmony Records

Dueto América was a Mexican musical duo composed of siblings Carolina and David González, from Aguascalientes, Aguascalientes whose greatest success was from the late 1940s to the 1960s. Beginning in the 1960s, Carolina and her sister Elvira were members of another duo called Las Palomas, which had a similar style to the duo with her brother David.

== Style ==
In addition to singing contemporary songs, Dueto América also helped to revive older folk songs known as corridos, as well rancheros (with the help of Fernando Z. Maldonado and Felipe Valdés Leal as composers).

The duo's string accompaniment, including harp (unusual at the time), was by Jacinto Gatica.

== Songs ==
- "Ojitos Soñadores"
- "El venadito"
- "Tres Suspiros"
- "Un Día Con Otro"
- "Gaviota Traidora"
- "La Vida Infausta"
- "La Delgadina"
- "El Corrido de Tomás y Abel"

== Recordings ==
The duo recorded several LP albums for Columbia Records and Harmony Records, with their output flourishing in the 1960s. Las Palomas recorded on CBS International and Caliente.
