= Mosquito Fire =

2022 wildfire in Northern California

- Part of the 2022 California wildfires
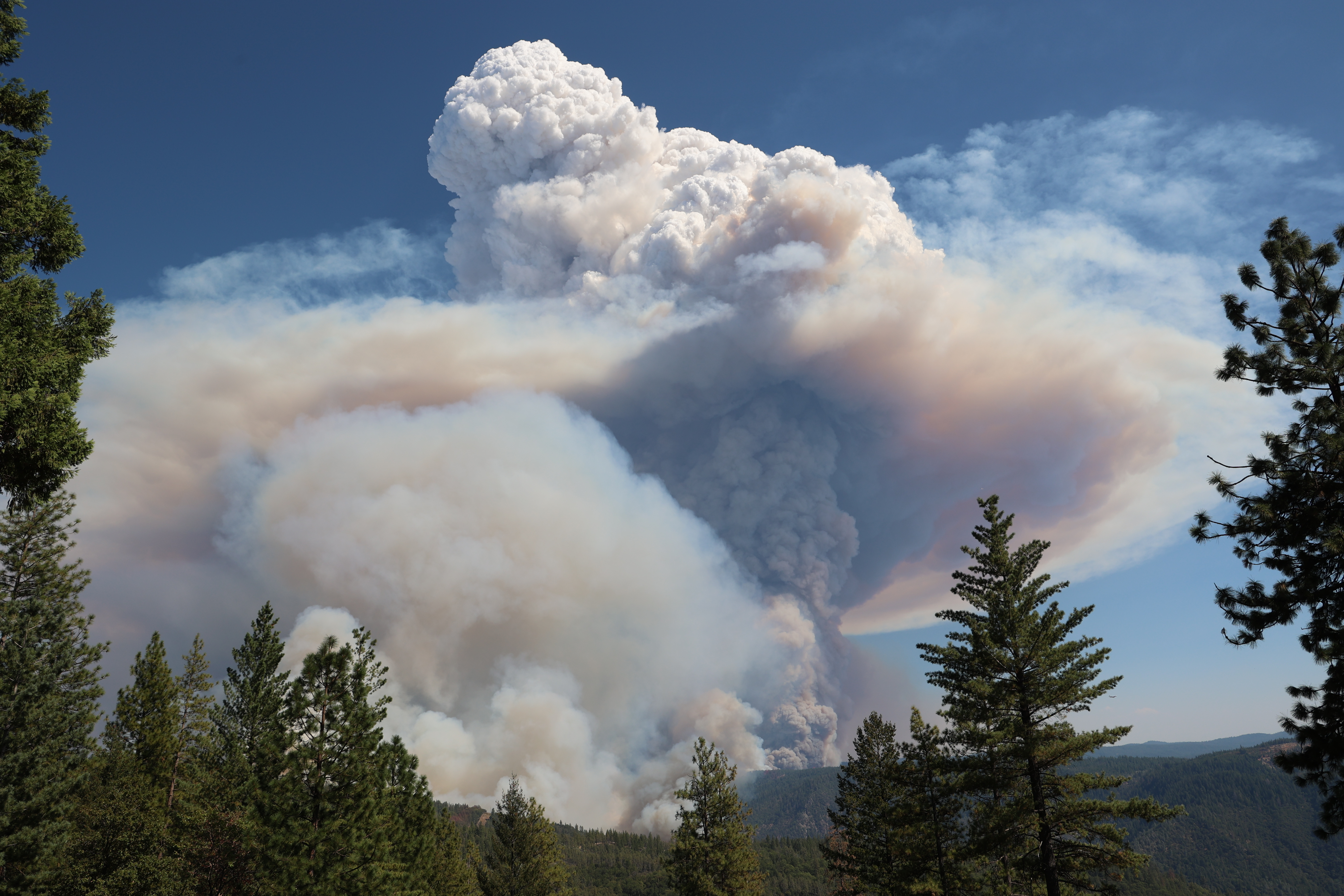
- A pyrocumulonimbus cloud rises from the Mosquito Fire on September 8, 2022
- Date: September 6 –; October 22, 2022; (47 days)
- Location: Placer County and; El Dorado County, Northern California, United States
- Coordinates: 39.006°N 120.745°W

Statistics
- Burned area: 76,788 acres (31,075 ha; 120 sq mi; 311 km^{2})

Impacts
- Deaths: 0
- Injuries: ≥2
- Evacuated: ≥11,260
- Structures destroyed: 78 (13 damaged)
- Cost: $181.1 million; (equivalent to about $192.5 million in 2024)

Ignition
- Cause: Electrical Equipment
- Perpetrators: Pacific Gas and Electric

Map
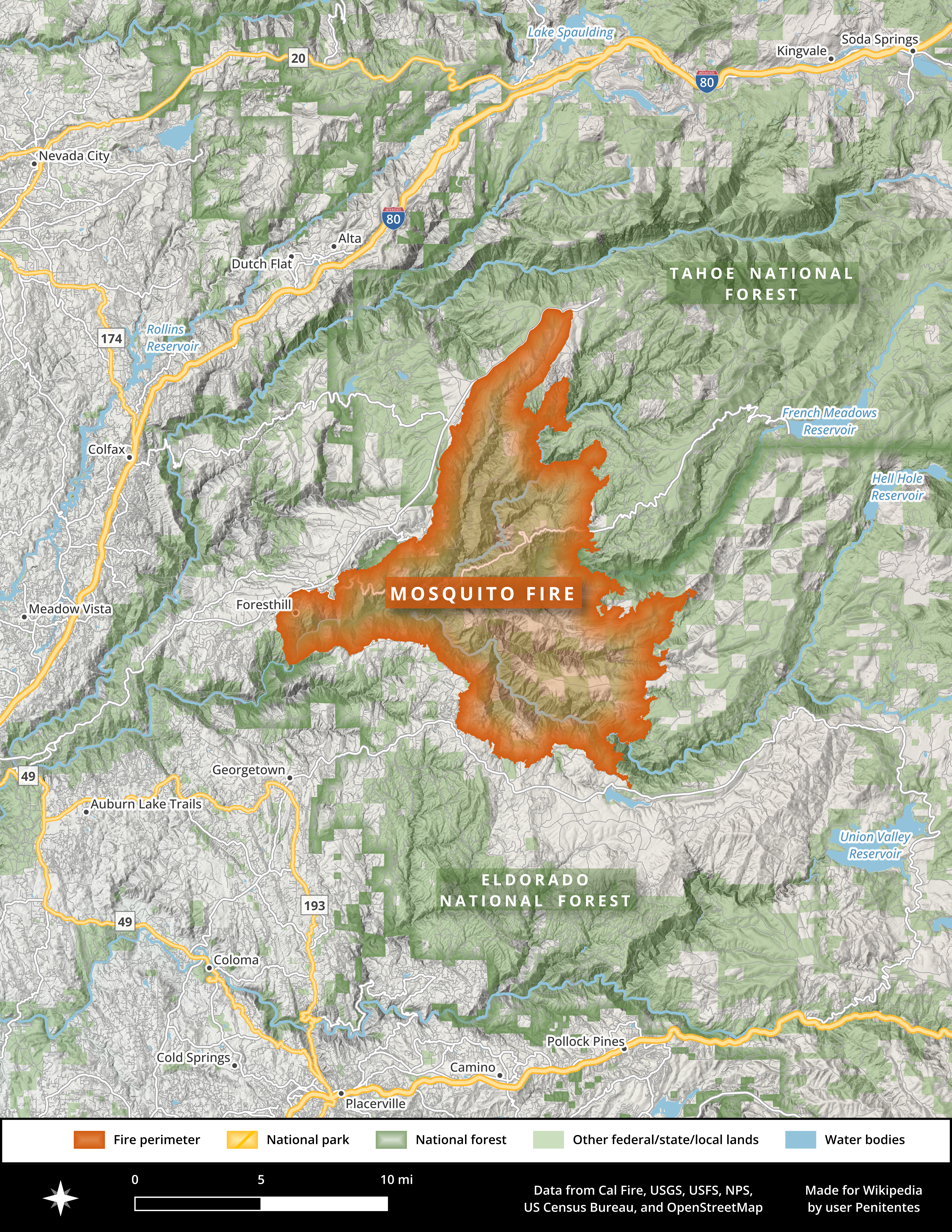
- The extent of the Mosquito Fire, west of Lake Tahoe in Tahoe and Eldorado National Forests

- The general location of the fire in Northern California

The Mosquito Fire was California's largest wildfire in 2022. The fire began on September 6, burned 76,788 acres (31,075 hectares) in Placer and El Dorado counties in September and October, and was pronounced fully contained on October 22. It affected the Tahoe and Eldorado National Forests and destroyed 78 structures in the rural communities of Michigan Bluff, Foresthill, and Volcanoville. The fire suppression effort cost more than $180 million, and at its peak involved more than 3,700 firefighters. The CPUC has determined the role of Pacific Gas & Electric Company (PG&E) equipment was to blame and is the subject of multiple civil lawsuits and a Forest Service investigation. The Mosquito Fire was one of 7,477 wildfires in California in 2022, which burned a combined 331,358 acres (134,096 ha).

== Background ==
In early September California experienced a record-breaking heat wave, which peaked on September 6. Climate scientist Daniel Swain described the heat wave as "the worst September heat wave on record" for Northern California. Vegetation moisture levels in the northern Sierra Nevada had already been nearing record lows, and the heatwave exacerbated the trend. On September 2, the National Interagency Fire Center had issued a "Fuels and Fire Behavior Advisory" for most of Northern California, warning of elevated fire weather concerns with "conditions conducive to long range spotting, rapid fire growth, and high resistance to control." A California Department of Forestry and Fire Protection (Cal Fire) fire behavior analyst later compared the spread of the Mosquito Fire to that of the 2014 King Fire, which burned 97,717 acres (39,545 ha) in the same region. Both fires were driven primarily by the extreme dryness of the vegetation in their respective years.

== Progression ==
=== September 6 ===
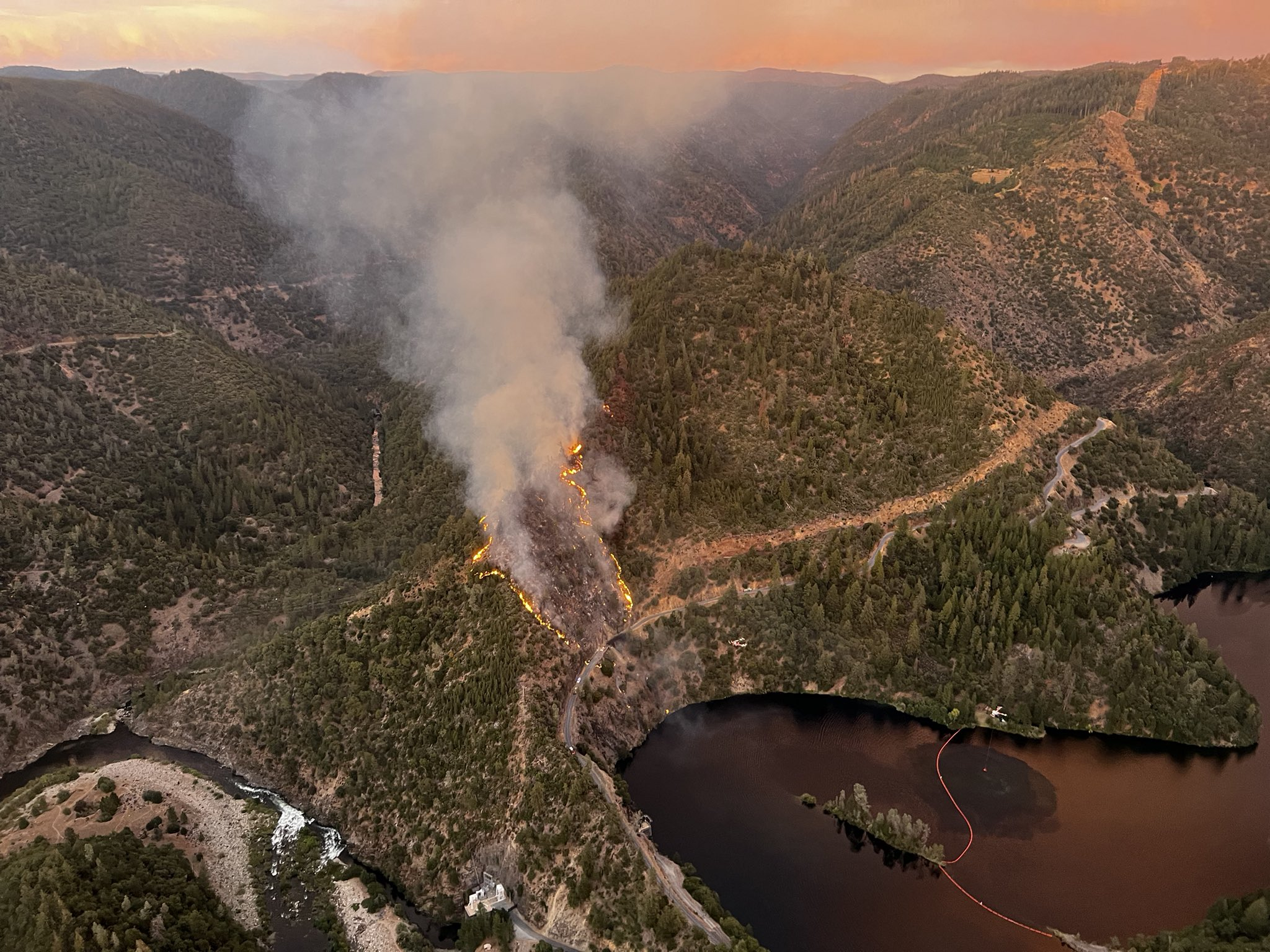
A view of the fire from a helicopter roughly one hour after it ignited

The Mosquito Fire was first reported on September 6 at approximately 6:27 p.m. PDT, above Oxbow Reservoir and near Mosquito Ridge Road (for which the fire was named). Firefighting aircraft arrived by 6:47 p.m., and they reported that the fire had burned four to five acres (1.6 to 2.0 ha) of brush and timber. Steep terrain and access issues hindered the fight: an old landslide on a road obstructed fire engines, and the fire was burning on the shadowed side of a canyon, making it difficult for larger air tankers to drop water or fire retardant. Aircraft were forced to leave once night began to fall at roughly 7:41 p.m., less than an hour after arriving on scene.

At around 9:00 p.m., the fire was fanned by outflow winds from nearby thunderstorms, and crews reported being challenged by the gusty winds and an increased rate of spread. As the fire began to spot ahead, evacuations were ordered for Michigan Bluff and surrounding roads. The fire jumped the North Fork of the Middle Fork American River and continued to spread, reaching 100 acres (40 ha) before midnight and producing a smoke plume visible from as far away as Auburn, 20 miles (32 km) to the southwest. The fire continued to burn actively through the night, moving northwest up the side of the Middle Fork American River canyon.

=== September 7–8 ===
On September 7, the Mosquito Fire grew considerably, developing a massive pyrocumulus cloud and exhibiting extreme behavior that made it difficult to directly combat the fire. Other concurrent wildfires caused fire personnel to compete for limited firefighting resources, such as Very Large Airtankers (VLATs). As the fire burned in all directions, it burned structures in the community of Michigan Bluff.

The next day, September 8, saw the single largest day of growth on the Mosquito Fire. The fire was mapped by FIRIS (the Fire Integrated Real-time Intelligence System, using aircraft with infrared sensors) at 13,705 acres (5,546 ha). Shortly afterwards, at approximately 1:00 p.m., the Mosquito Fire jumped the American River southward into El Dorado County, burning toward Volcanoville and destroying structures along Volcanoville Road. It burned an additional 17,000 acres (6,880 ha) in four hours. An elderly couple was trapped behind the fire line when their vehicle was disabled, requiring a sortie through the flames by an El Dorado County Sheriff's deputy.

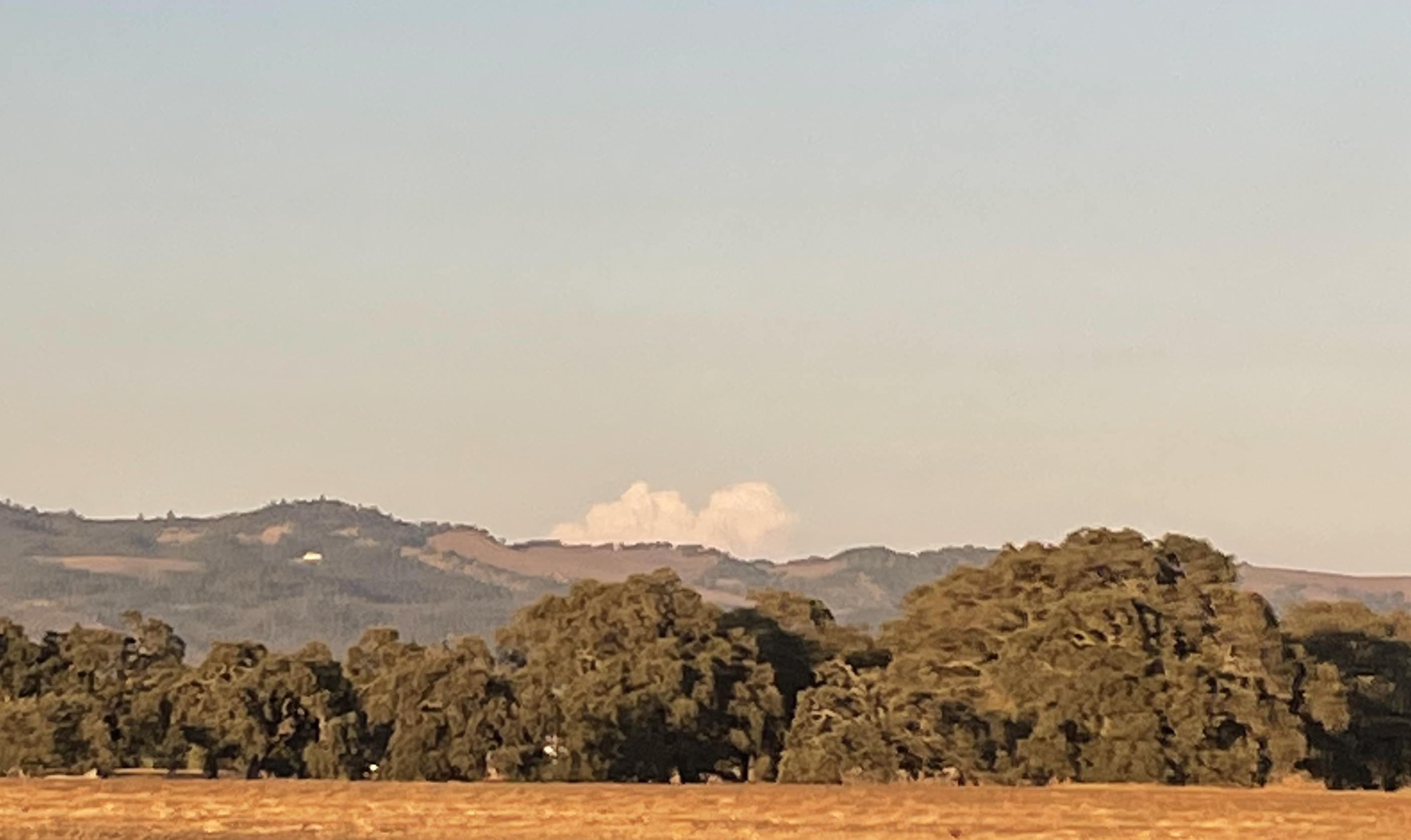
The fire's smoke plume was visible from Sonoma—more than 126 miles (203 km) west—on September 8.

As fire activity intensified, the Mosquito Fire produced an enormous pyrocumulonimbus cloud that reached more than 41,000 feet (12,000 m) in altitude, visible from Chico and Sonoma more than 120 miles away. A NOAA aircraft flew around the smoke column while conducting research with San Jose State University's Fire Weather Research Laboratory and the University of Nevada on fire and atmospheric processes. Radar showed that the pyrocumulonimbus cloud contained updrafts with speeds in excess of 30 meters per second. The Mosquito Fire continued to generate a pyrocumulonimbus cloud after sunset.

During this time, scientists recorded a "very strong fire-generated vortex", both visually and on radar, on the southeast flank of the Mosquito Fire. This cyclonic vortex within the rotating column of smoke was connected to the ground, had a circulation extending up to approximately 10,000 feet (3,000 m), and generated winds equivalent in strength to an EF-1 tornado. Similar vortices have occurred in multiple California wildfires, including the 2020 Creek Fire, the 2020 Loyalton Fire, and the 2018 Carr Fire.

=== September 9 onwards ===
Officials warned of "great potential" for continued fire spread.

On September 9, firefighting conditions improved with slightly cooler temperatures and low winds, and the fire remained under an inversion of its own smoke. On September 10, the temperatures and higher relative humidities continued to moderate fire behavior, but increasing winds pushed the fire further north and northeast. The movement prompted more evacuations, primarily between the fire and the Sierra crest.

By the morning of September 11, fire crews had achieved 10 percent containment, primarily on the southwest flanks in the vicinity of Volcanoville and Quintette. The fire remained active on the 11th, particularly once the inversion lifted again, but did not spread rapidly. Firefighters began to remove trees and brush from old fire lines from the 2013 American Fire and the 2014 King Fire, in anticipation of reusing them as containment lines. By the evening of September 12, containment rose to 16 percent as firefighters continued to strengthen containment lines near Foresthill and Volcanoville, on the northern and southern flanks respectively.

On September 13, remaining tropical moisture from the remnants of Hurricane Kay left the area and was replaced by persistent southwest winds. Though firefighters achieved 18 percent containment by the morning, the winds allowed smoke to clear and the inversion to break, leading to an uptick in fire activity. The entire eastern flank of the fire was highly active, and new evacuation orders were issued for the Stumpy Meadows area. Between 2:00 and 2:30 p.m, the fire spotted from the south side of the Middle Fork American River to the north side, below Todd Valley and Foresthill, on the west flank of the fire. The spot fire grew aggressively and became established, creating a large plume as it burned up towards Foresthill, which had been under a mandatory evacuation for several days by that point. Some personnel working on dozer lines in the canyon were forced to abandon their equipment and flee from the rapidly growing fire. Fire crews hastily set backfires between Foresthill Road and the fire to the south in order to consume the fuel between the two and prevent the fire from overrunning the community. A massive airshow attempted to halt the fire, as 16 different aircraft, including all four of the Very Large Air Tankers operated in the United States, aided ground crews. Those tankers also dropped massive amounts of retardant to reinforce the firefighting efforts—just shy of 200,000 gallons on September 13 alone. By that evening, the fire was mapped at approximately 58,000 acres, representing nearly 10,000 acres (4,047 ha) of growth in a day, with 25 percent containment.

On Wednesday, September 14, the fire burned an additional 5,000 acres (2,023 ha), reaching 63,776 acres (25,809 ha) and surpassing the McKinney Fire to become California's largest wildfire of the year.

The fire continued to burn to the east, in steep and inaccessible terrain in canyons upriver from the confluence of the Middle Fork American River, where the North Fork of Middle Fork American River, the Middle Fork American River, and the Rubicon River come together. It burned through much of the footprint of the 2006 Ralston Fire, as well as parts of the burn scars from the American and King fires.

The fire was moderated by an unseasonably early Pacific storm that brought wetting rains to the area in mid-September, after which the fire grew little and containment steadily increased. Beginning on September 18, it brought rain to much of Northern California, including the Sierra and the Mosquito Fire. The fire increased in acreage on the 17th, fueled by gusty winds ahead of the storm, but the ensuing precipitation tamped down fire activity. This allowed fire crews to finish gaining containment around the fire perimeter on the southern, western, and northern sides, leaving the wide eastern flank as the only remaining open fire front. This effort, along with the storm, allowed several thousand people to return to their homes as evacuation orders were lifted or reduced. Concerns that heavy rain could cause flash flooding and ash/debris flows in the burn scar led to a flash flood watch being issued for the entire Mosquito Fire burn area on September 18 and 19. In the meantime, steep and muddy terrain posed new challenges for firefighting. On September 19, for the first time since igniting, the Mosquito Fire did not increase in acreage, though smoking hot spots were still visible during gaps in the rain.

An interactive map of the Mosquito Fire's perimeter

By September 21, all evacuation orders in both Placer and El Dorado counties were lifted. Firefighters struggled to complete the last five percent of containment line, hampered by the extremely difficult terrain of the river canyons, but ultimately declared the fire 100 percent contained on October 22, 46 days after it began. The fire was officially declared controlled on November 10. The total cost of fighting the Mosquito Fire was estimated by the National Interagency Fire Center at $181.1 million.

== Effects ==
No deaths were reported as a result of the Mosquito Fire. At least two firefighters were injured; one hurt their wrist in a fall and another stepped into a still-burning stump hole, sustaining second-degree burns on their leg.

At least 78 structures were destroyed and 13 were damaged; on September 7, the fire burned in the area of Michigan Bluff, on September 8 the Mosquito Fire impacted structures near Volcanoville and Quintette, and on September 13 the fire impacted structures in Foresthill. Local and regional infrastructure was affected: the Georgetown Divide Public Utility District declared a local emergency after the fire affected its water service infrastructure, including damaged canals and flumes. The Placer County Water Agency, which operates the Middle Fork Project (a water supply and hydroelectric power generation system, and California's eight-largest public power project), sued PG&E after alleging that the fire had caused, in addition to physical damage to its facilities, the loss of tens of millions of dollars in power production sales.

Also threatened was the Placer County Big Trees Grove, a group of six old-growth giant sequoias and the northernmost giant sequoia grove in California. The U.S. Forest Service conducted defensive burning operations and cleared fuel around the grove while treating the trees with water, and the fire was eventually stopped four miles from the grove.

The Mosquito Fire led to evacuations in several communities in Placer County and El Dorado County. By September 11, at least 11,260 people were under evacuation orders. That number included residents of Michigan Bluff, Foresthill, and Todd Valley in Placer County, and Volcanoville and Georgetown in El Dorado County. At least eight people were arrested in evacuation areas for crimes "against evacuated properties" (one person in Placer County and seven in El Dorado County). One person apprehended for burglary posed as a PG&E contractor to get past law enforcement checkpoints.

A large portion of the Tahoe National Forest was closed, and recreation areas such as the French Meadows Reservoir and the Western States Endurance Run trail were expected to be closed at least through the end of 2022. An area encompassing 20 miles (32 km) of the Western States Endurance Run route burned. The Rubicon Trail (a popular 4x4 road/trail) was also closed.

=== Environmental impacts ===
Smoke from the Mosquito Fire routinely led to hazardous air qualities in many nearby regions in Northern California and Nevada, including the Lake Tahoe Basin and the cities of Folsom and Auburn. Air quality indices of more than 1,000 were recorded in the Sierra foothills south of Interstate 80, near the fire. Some events, such as the Great Reno Balloon Race, were affected. On at least one day, schools throughout Washoe County were forced to close as local health officials declared an air quality emergency. Major businesses and facilities, such as the Tesla, Inc.Gigafactory near Sparks, adjusted their HVAC systems and provided N-95 respirator masks. Smoke from the Mosquito Fire and other Western wildfires traveled as far as the East Coast, visible on satellite images. Researchers with the U.C. Davis Tahoe Environmental Research Center studied the effects of smoke particulates from the Mosquito Fire on Lake Tahoe, using a robotic underwater glider first deployed during the Caldor Fire in 2021.

The Mosquito Fire burned 700 acres (283 ha) of the 4,356-acre (1,763 ha) Blodgett Forest Research Station, owned by the University of California, Berkeley. A recently donated parcel of 400 acres (162 ha) burned at high severity, with close to 100 percent vegetation mortality. According to a Berkeley ecologist, the ~250 acres (101 ha) treated with prescribed fire and other methods saw more moderate fire behavior when the Mosquito Fire passed through them compared to areas that had not been treated.

The Mosquito Fire also burned large parts of multiple watersheds that empty into Oxbow Reservoir and the Middle Fork American River, providing drinking water to communities in the Central Valley and Sierra foothills. The Placer County Water Agency added water treatment steps to remove sediment, ash, and debris that might enter waterways. During early winter storms after the fire, Cal Fire monitored the burn area for erosion and debris flows while performing mitigation work.

The Forest Service conducted its regular post-fire analysis of the burned area, concluding that about 66 percent of the fire footprint had a low or very low soil burn severity, 25 percent had a moderate soil burn severity, and 9 percent of the fire footprint had a high soil burn severity. High soil burn severity areas are more prone to increased runoff rates and erosion, creating higher probabilities for downstream flooding and debris flows. Eric Nicita, a soil scientist with the Eldorado National Forest, was surprised at the relatively high percentage of low soil burn severity, generally indicating more burning confined to the understory. The nearby Caldor Fire had experienced higher burn severities. The highest-intensity soil burn region was located in the drainage of the Rubicon River, between Foresthill and the Volcanoville/Quintette area.

=== Political response ===
On September 8, Governor of California Gavin Newsom declared a state of emergency for Placer and El Dorado counties. The following day, the Federal Emergency Management Agency (FEMA) granted the state's request for a Fire Management Assistance Grant (FMAG), which can provide federal funding for a large portion of eligible firefighting costs, including field camps, equipment, and mobilization/demobilization of personnel.

On September 22, California Insurance Commissioner Ricardo Lara announced an moratorium on the cancellation or non-renewal of residential insurance coverage in areas affected by the Mosquito Fire. The moratorium required insurance companies to maintain policies for one year after Newsom's September 8 emergency declaration for California policyholders living within the perimeter of the Mosquito Fire or in adjacent ZIP codes, totaling 18 ZIP codes in Placer and El Dorado counties. The moratorium also included ZIP codes affected by the Fairview Fire in Southern California.

On November 19, Governor Newsom signed an executive order allowing some environmental regulations to be suspended to expedite the removal of hazardous debris and speed other fire recovery actions.

== Cause ==
The cause of the Mosquito Fire has not officially been determined, and Cal Fire lists it as under investigation. However, an official compensation website provided by PG&E, ( dp4cr.com ) is currently accepting applications for compensation for destroyed or damaged properties affected. In addition attention circulated around a Pacific Gas and Electric Company (PG&E) incident report noting unspecified electrical activity close in time and location to the first report of the Mosquito Fire.

As of 2023, the company is cooperating with an investigation by the Forest Service and the Department of Justice into the cause of the blaze, and has been asked to produce documents and information for the probe. PG&E recorded a $100 million charge in the third quarter of 2022 when it determined that it would likely incur a loss from the fire, though the investigation had not yet finished. Those who lost homes in the fire were able to submit direct payment claims to PG&E for compensation through the company's Direct Payments for Community Recovery (DP4CR) Program.

=== PG&E incident report ===
On September 8, PG&E submitted an incident report to the California Public Utilities Commission (CPUC), indicating that "electrical activity occurred close in time to the report time of the fire", and that the U.S. Forest Service had placed caution tape around one of their 60-kilovolt overhead power transmission poles, on the Oxbow Tap/Middle Fork #1 line. The report also mentioned that PG&E had observed no damage or abnormal conditions to the transmission pole or other nearby facilities, nor had they observed down conductors in the area, or any vegetation on the line. In a September 8 interview, PG&E executive vice president Sumeet Singh said that the power line on the transmission pole tripped offline in what was described as a fault, close to the fire's reported start time. The pole had been installed about a decade earlier, and had been inspected within five months of the Mosquito Fire with no signs of damage found. A preliminary inspection conducted after the fire started showed that the power line remained hung on the steel transmission pole, with no signs of contact with a tree. Singh said the company filed the report out of an abundance of caution. In California, utilities are required to submit reports related to any incident that is attributable or allegedly attributable to their facilities when they pass specific thresholds for impacts.

PG&E had previously been found liable for several major wildfires in Northern California. The 2021 Dixie Fire, California's single largest wildfire, began in Butte County when a tree fell on a PG&E power line in the Feather River Canyon. The 2018 Camp Fire, California's deadliest wildfire, also began in the Feather River Canyon when hardware on a PG&E power line failed. PG&E was also implicated in the 2015 Butte Fire, the 2019 Kincade Fire, the 2020 Zogg Fire, and others. The company filed for Chapter 11 bankruptcy in 2019 after amassing $30 billion in liability for wildfires in the preceding years, emerging from bankruptcy in July 2020.

=== Litigation ===
In late September 2022, two civil lawsuits were filed against PG&E in the San Francisco Superior Court, both alleging that the fire was ignited by the company's utility infrastructure and a failure to safely operate/maintain it. Both suits were filed on behalf of affected property owners. In December 2022, the Placer County Water Agency filed another lawsuit, seeking damages from PG&E related to the Mosquito Fire. In January 2023, El Dorado and Placer counties (with the El Dorado Water Agency, Georgetown Divide Public Utilities District and Georgetown Divide Fire Protection District as co-plaintiffs) filed a third suit against PG&E, again accusing the company of negligence and seeking to recoup costs from "fire suppression; law enforcement costs and overtime; administration, funding and operation of emergency operations and evacuation shelters; and lost tax revenue."

=== Forest Service criminal probe ===
On September 26, 2022, PG&E filed a Form 8-K financial report announcing that (1) the Forest Service had indicated to them that the Mosquito Fire started in the area of the company's power line, (2) the Forest Service was conducting a criminal investigation, and (3) the Forest Service had removed and taken possession of one of PG&E's transmission poles and attached equipment on September 24. The company said elsewhere that it was cooperating with the Forest Service's investigation in addition to conducting its own.

== Fire growth and containment ==
Fire containment status Gray: contained; Red: active; %: percent contained;
Date	Area burned in acres	Personnel	Containment
Sep 6	5	...	
Sep 7	5,705	...	
Sep 8	13,705	...	
Sep 9	33,754	...	
Sep 10	37,326	...	
Sep 11	46,587	...	
Sep 12	48,700	...	
Sep 13	57,999	...	
Sep 14	63,776	...	
Sep 15	67,669	...	
Sep 16	71,292	...	
Sep 17	73,381	...	
Sep 18	76,290	...	
Sep 19	76,290	...	
Sep 20	76,290	...	
Sep 21	76,427	...	
Sep 22	76,575	...	
Sep 23	76,781	...	
Sep 24	76,781	...	
Sep 25	76,781	...	
Sep 26	76,781	...	
Sep 27	76,775	...	
Sep 28	76,775	...	
Sep 29	76,775	...	
Sep 30	76,788	...	
...	...	...	...
Oct 22	76,788	...	

== See also ==
- Butte Fire (2015) – destructive wildfire in Amador and Calaveras counties, caused by a PG&E power line
- Dixie Fire (2021) – wildfire in the northern Sierra, largest of 2021 in California, caused by a tree falling on a PG&E power line
- Oak Fire (2022) – another destructive 2022 California wildfire, in Mariposa County
