= La Delgadina =

"La Delgadina" is a Mexican folk song, or corrido, centering on a young lady that disobeys her father's wish to be his wife, ending with her tragic death. It's a story of incest, but later used during the Mexican Revolution to depict the power struggles between the classes. La Delgadina has its origins in Spain as a longer ballad with a more-descriptive background; it was simplified in Mexico in the 18th-century just alluding to the fact of Delgadina's refusal and later punishment.

== Storyline ==
The storyline goes as Delgadina, a young lady that wears a silk dress wanders around her living room. Her father instructs her to wear her silk skirt (nagua de seda in Spanish) to travel to Morelia to church for Mass.

After Mass, her father (described as a king) tells her of his longing to marry her. Delgadina refuses, saying, "God of Heaven and the sovereign queen forbid this offense to God and treason to my mother".

Delgadina's father then locks her up with the help of his eleven servants. Delgadina apparently spends days locked in a tower and pleads to her father for water. Upon hearing this, the father quickly sends the eleven servants to give Delgadina water in a gold cup. Unfortunately, they find her dead with her arms crossed and her mouth open.

The ending describes Delgadina's heavenly ascension, and her father's infernal demise.

== Later interpretations ==
The song has been made famous by Mexican artists such as Irma Serrano, Dueto América, and Las Hermanas Mendoza.

An adaptation of La Deldadina was featured in the 1987 television film Corridos: Tales of Passion & Revolution, directed by Luis Valdez and adapted from his play. In the segment for La Delgadina, Evelyn Cisneros plays Delgadina.

In 2008, a direct-to-video film based on the ballad was released with the name of El Corrido de Delgadina. It stars Jorge Gómez as the father and Carmelita López as Delgadina.

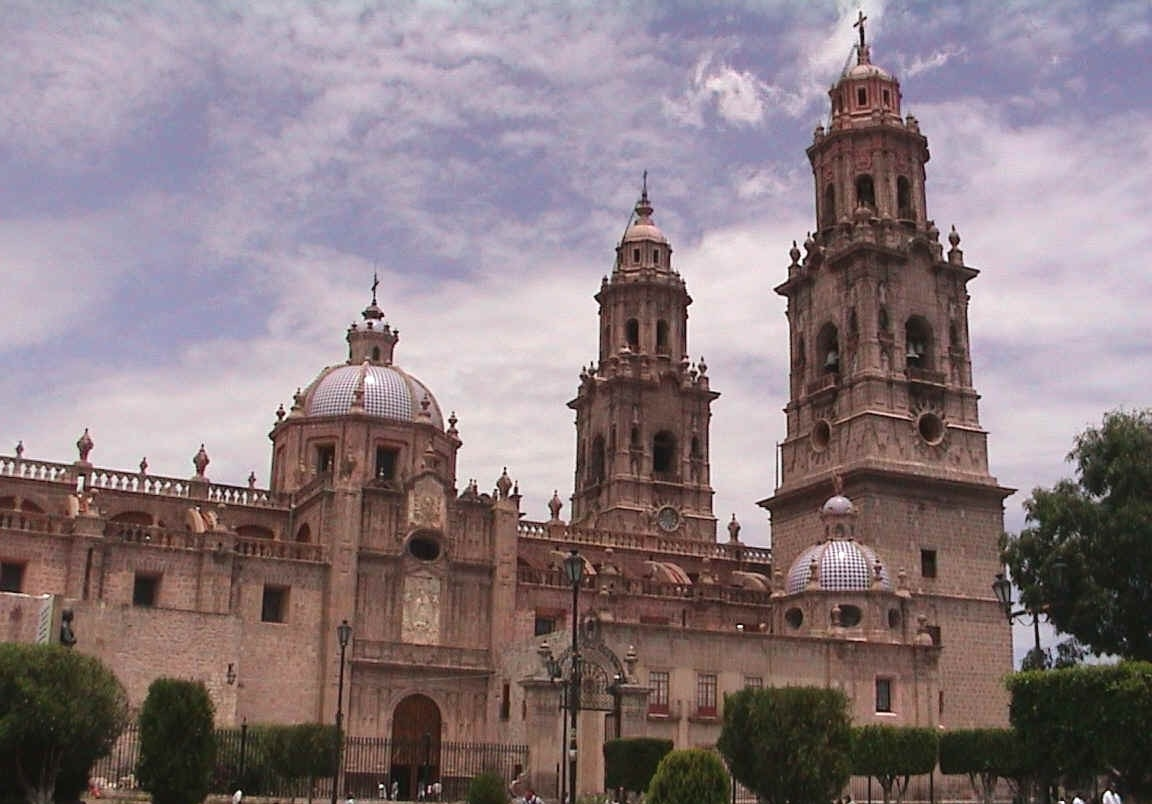
Morelia, Michoacán is mentioned in the corrido.

In the novel Memories of My Melancholy Whores by Gabriel García Márquez, the 90-year-old narrator sings the song to an underage prostitute who reminds him of Delgadina. He desires her though he knows it is illegal and morally wrong.

== Lyrics ==
A 1990 rendition of the Spanish version of Delgadina by Rosario Ustáriz from Valle de Hecho, Spain

Delgadina se paseaba de la sala a la cocina
con su vestido de seda, que a su cuerpo le ilumina

Delgadina walks from the parlor to the kitchen
with her silk dress, that illuminates her body

Levántate Delgadina, ponte tus nahuas de seda
porque nos vamos a misa a la ciudad de Morelia

Wake up Delgadina, put your silk clothes on
because we're going to attend mass at the city of Morelia

Luego que salio de misa su papá le platicaba
Delgadina hijita mía yo te quiero para dama

Right after mass, her father told her
Delgadina, my daughter, I want you as my wife

No permita Dios del cielo ni la reina soberana
Esta ofensa para Dios y traicion para mi mama

God of Heaven and the sovereign queen forbid
this offense to God, and treason to my mother

Júntense los once criados y enciérren a Delgadina
remachen bien los candados, que no se oiga voz ladina

Eleven servants, gather around and lock up Delgadina
Tighten up the locks, so that no soft voice may be heard

Papacito de mi vida, tu castigo esto sufriendo,
regálame un vaso de agua, que de sed me estoy muriendo

Dear father of my life, your punishment I am suffering
Give me a cup of water, for I am dying of thirst

Júntense los once criados, llévenle agua a Delgadina,
en vaso sobredorado, vaso de cristal de China

Eleven servants, gather around give water to Delgadina
in a gold cup, a cup of Chinese crystal.

Cuando le llevaron l'agua, Delgadina estaba muerta,
tenía sus brazos cruzados, tenía su boquita abierta

When they went to give her water, Delgadina was dead
she had her arms crossed, she had her mouth open

La cama de Delgadina de ángeles esta rodeada,
la cama del rey su padre de demonios apretada

The bed of Delgadina is surrounded by angels
The bed of her father the king, of demons tightened

Ya con esta me despido, tengo una cita en la esquina,
aqui se acaban cantando versos de la Delgadina

And with this I say goodbye, I have an appointment in the corner
Here ends the singing of the verses of 'La Delgadina'
