= French Meadows Reservoir =

Manmade lake in Placer County, California

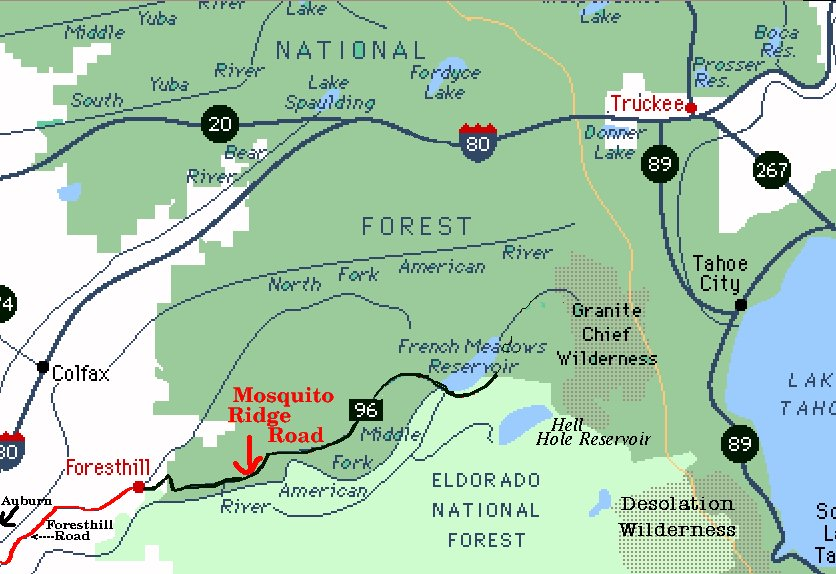
- Map of area around reservoir

- Location within California Location within the United States
- Location: Placer County, California
- Coordinates: 39°06′42″N 120°28′06″W
- Primary inflows: North Fork American River
- Basin countries: United States
- Max. length: 2.9 mi (4.7 km)
- Max. width: 0.6 mi (0.97 km)
- Water volume: 125,601 acre⋅ft (154,927,000 m^{3})
- Shore length^{1}: 7.3 mi (11.7 km)
- Surface elevation: 5,263 ft (1,604 m)
- ^{1} Shore length is not a well-defined measure.

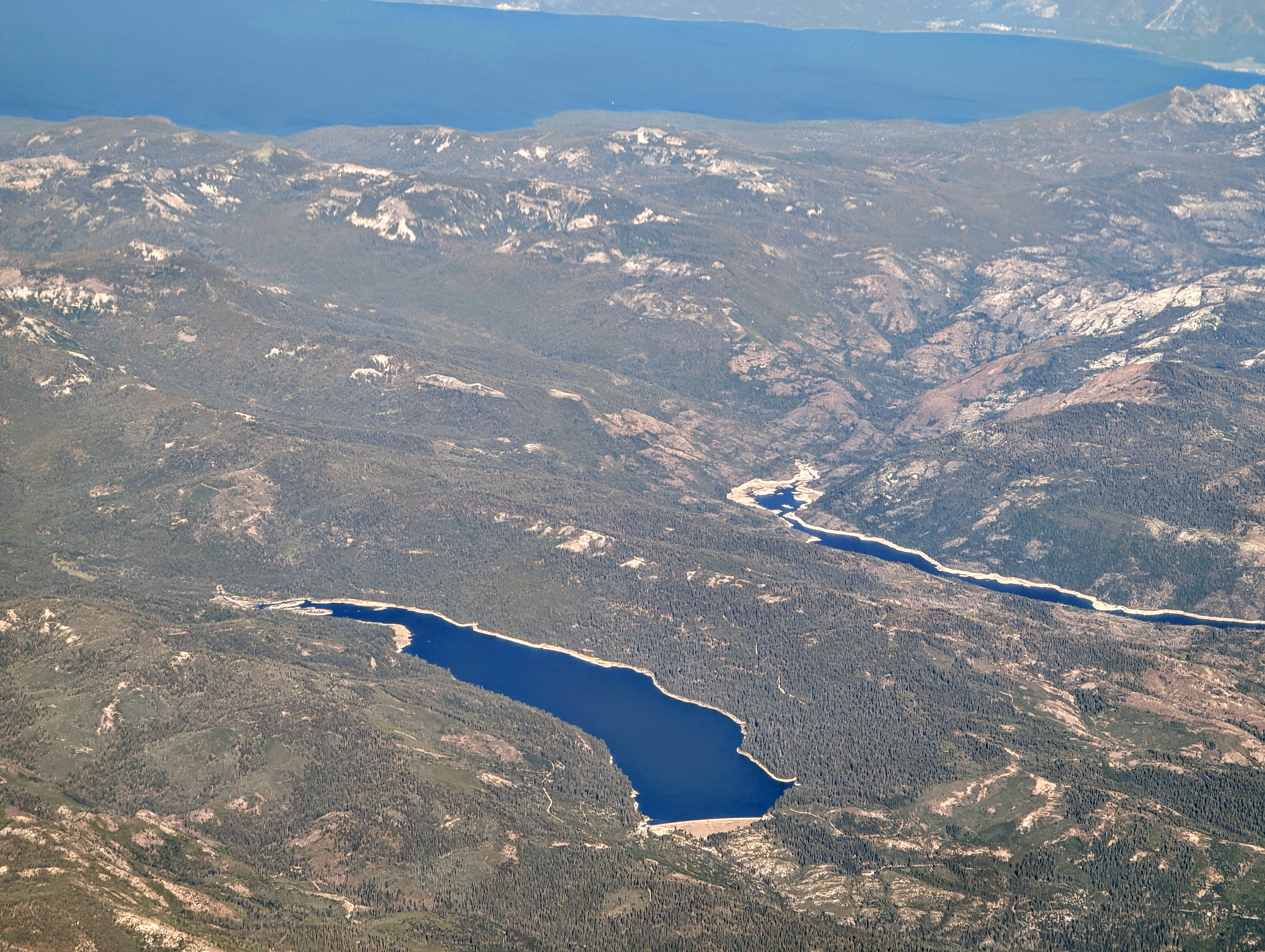
Aerial view from the west (looking east), of French Meadows Reservoir (near) and Hell Hole Reservoir (far), with Lake Tahoe in the background

French Meadows Reservoir is a manmade lake 36 miles (58 km) northeast of Foresthill, California, United States on the Middle Fork of the American River. The reservoir is 2.9 miles (4.7 km) long, 0.6-mile (0.97 km) wide, with 7.3 miles (11.7 km) of shoreline.

Tahoe National Forest manages the recreational facilities which include five campgrounds, two group campgrounds and two paved boat launch ramps. Activities at the lake include powerboating, kayaking, canoeing, fishing, picnicking and hiking. The reservoir is entirely within a state game refuge so no firearms, pellet guns or archery weapons are allowed.

The elevation of the lake is 5,263 feet (1,604 m), and it is nine miles (14 km) from the crest of the Sierra Nevada Mountain Range.

The California Office of Environmental Health Hazard Assessment (OEHHA) has developed a safe eating advisory for French Meadows Reservoir based on levels of mercury found in fish caught here.

== History ==
The reservoir was built in December 1964 (61 years ago) with the construction on the Middle Fork of the American River of the L. L. Anderson Dam. The dam is rock-fill with earth core. The capacity of the reservoir is 125,601 acre-feet (154,927,000 m^{3}) of water. French Meadows Reservoir is part of the Middle Fork Project for hydroelectric power generation and most of its water is diverted to the French Meadows Powerhouse, located along the north shore of Hell Hole Reservoir, by a tunnel. Releases from French Meadows Reservoir to the powerhouse began one year later, December 13, 1965. A minimal "fish flow" is released into the natural waterway of the Middle Fork of the American River for fish and wildlife habitat considerations. The project is operated by the Placer County Water Agency.

In September 2022, the area surrounding the reservoir was closed by the forest service due to the Mosquito Fire.

== See also ==
- List of dams and reservoirs in California
- List of lakes in California
