= El Corrido de Rosita Alvírez =

"El Corrido de Rosita Alvírez" is a Mexican corrido, a type of storytelling put to music. It tells the story of young Rosita Alvírez who, despite her mother's warnings, decides to go to a baile (dance) one night. She gets there and a man named Hipolito asks her to dance. She declines, and Hipolito shoots her three times because of the embarrassment he feels. In the end, Rosita is in el cielo (heaven) and Hipolito is in la cárcel (jail).

The most well-known verse of the corrido has a touch of humor. It says: el día que la mataron, Rosita estaba de suerte, de tres tiros que le dieron, nomás uno era de muerte which translates to: The day that she was killed, Rosita was in luck, of the three shots she received, only one was deadly.

The corrido is based on real events that occurred in Saltillo, Coahuila in 1900.

== Musical recordings ==
There are over a hundred recorded versions including by Antonio Aguilar, Sparx, Los Alegres de Teran, Beatriz Adriana and so on. But perhaps the most well-known one is the one sung by Piporro.

== In popular culture ==
Rosita Alvírez is one of the more famous corridos and thus has had resonance in popular culture. There have been multiple films with different versions of the story. These include El Corrido de Rosita Alvirez, a 1947 film starring Luis Aguilar and Maria Luisa Zena and directed by Raúl de Anda; Rosita Alvarez was my betrothed, a 1955 film also starring Luis Aguilar; and Rosita Alvirez, Destino Sangriento (bloody ending) a 1982 film starring Beatriz Adriana and Pedro Infante Jr.
