= SB Wyvenhoe =

British Thames sailing barge

Wyvenhoe
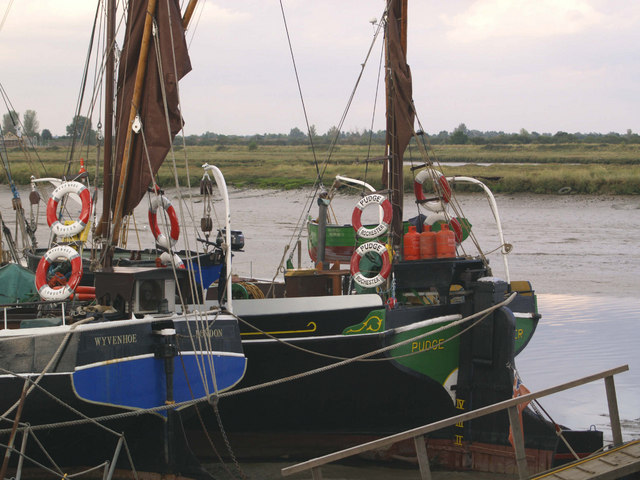
- Wyvenhoe with Pudge on the Blackwater Estuary in 2007

History

United Kingdom
- Builder: Forrest and Son Ltd, Wivenhoe
- Launched: 1898
- Identification: United Kingdom Official Number : 110012
- Status: Under restoration

General characteristics
- Class & type: Thames barge
- Tonnage: 103.25 GRT registered 83.19
- Length: 85 ft (25.91 m)
- Beam: 19 ft (5.79 m)
- Draught: 4 ft (1.22 m)
- Propulsion: Sails: area 3,500 sq ft (330 m^{2})
- Sail plan: Spritsail
- Speed: 10.5 kn (19.4 km/h)
- Notes: Ironpot- constructed in iron, then in 1947 plated in steel.

SB Wyvenhoe is an 83-ton, steel Thames sailing barge. She was built by Forrest & Sons, Wivenhoe in 1898. She has the Official Number 110012.

== History ==
She traded under sail until 1923, when she converted to a motor ship. She was rebuilt in steel in 1947 and continued to trade until 1982. She holds the record of having traded longer than any other British registered ship. She was owned in trade by London and Rochester Trading Company, then re-rigged as company yacht barge by Richard Walsh in 1986. She is now owned by Trad Sail Charters and based in Maldon.

== See also ==
- SB Kathleen
