= Valona (song) =

The valona is a popular narrative song- and poetry-form of the Mexican state of Michoacán. Its main characteristics are a bitter sense of humor, bawdy content, and social concerns. The lyrics of a Valona are composed as groupings of ten-line strophes, each line made up of eight syllables; musically, all valonas are sung (in fact, almost recited) to just a single tune, with an instrumental refrain after each strophe, which can vary.

As a narrative popular genre, the valona is literarily and musically related to the Mexican corrido. In a broader stylistic sense, it is akin with other Mexican genres composed in ten minor-verse strophes (décimas or espinelas), such as some huapangos and the son arribeño, along with certain other Latin American genres, such as the Chilean run-run and the rhapsodes of the Argentine payadores.
