= SB Kathleen =

Spritsail Thames barge built 1901

- Sail plan of Kathleen from 1901 until 1926

History

United Kingdom
- Name: Kathleen
- Operator: Daniels Brothers
- Builder: Glover, Gravesend
- Commissioned: 1901
- Decommissioned: 1961
- Identification: Official number 113708
- Fate: Restored as a barge yacht, then lost in 1983. Fittings went to restore SB Wyvenhoe

General characteristics
- Tonnage: 59 gross register tons (GRT)
- Length: 82.8 ft (25.2 m)
- Beam: 19.7 ft (6.0 m)
- Height: 75 ft (23 m) deck to bob
- Draught: 6 ft (1.8 m) laden, 30 in (0.76 m) light
- Propulsion: Sail
- Sail plan: Spritsail barge
- Speed: 8 knots (15 km/h) maximum speed
- Capacity: 167 tonnes
- Crew: 2

The SB Kathleen was a spritsail Thames barge built by Glover at Gravesend, Kent, in England in 1901, and registered in Rochester. Her official number was 113,708. She was built to carry grain- for capacity rather than speed. she was 82.8 feet (25.2 m) long and had a beam of 19.7 feet (6.0 m). Light, she drew 30 inches (76 cm) of water, and laden 6 feet (1.8 m).

Kathleen's rig was changed with commercial needs. She took on an auxiliary motor, and then became a motor barge and in the 1960 was registered and worked as a timber lighter. She was sunk in 1923 by a Cunarder then refloated. In the 1953 East Coast storms she was washed up the shore at Whitstable and demolished several buildings. She was rerigged by an enthusiast in 1966 and raced again, before meeting her end in Spaarndam in 1986, with spars and fittings being passed on to the Wyvenhoe.

== History ==
=== Working barge ===
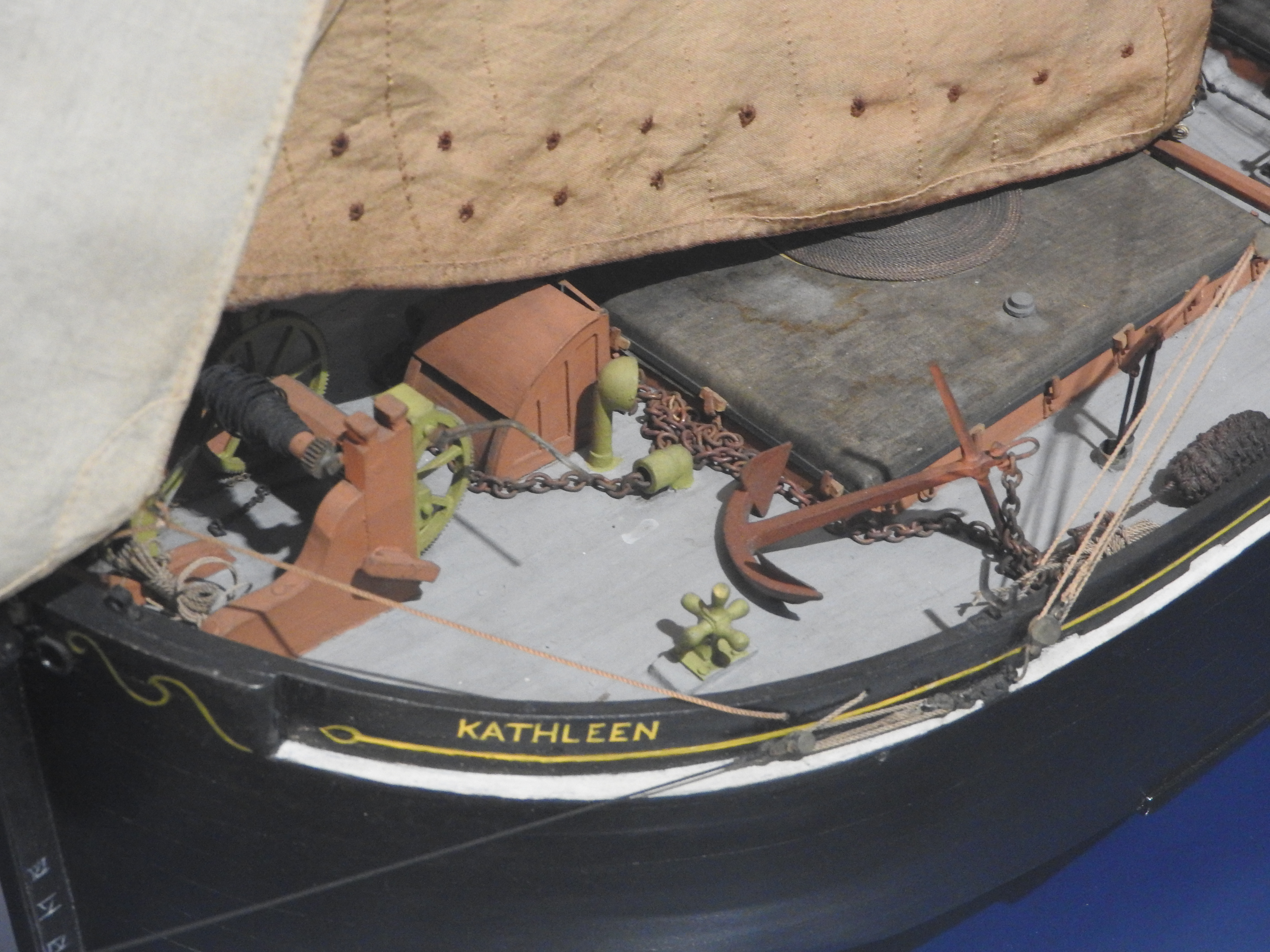
Model

She was launched in 1901 and worked for Daniels Brothers of Whitstable principally as a grain barge. In the first world war she carried other dry cargoes such as coal, timber and iron pipes. Modifications were made to her hold for easier loading, though this was later reversed. She continued to do cross channel work until 1920: as a barge she could safely sail over the Goodwin Sands if the leeboards were raised. After the 1914–1918 conflict, minefields remained and passage through the swept channel was only permitted in daylight. In the 1920s regular work was in grain and animal foodstuffs all within the confines of the estuary and the river.

On 6 March 1923, she and two other Whitstable barges were taking on cargo in Greenwich when the Cunard steamer, Virgilia (1918–1944) lost control and smashed into them, sinking two of them. Why Not was built at Faversham in 1866 (38 Reg Tons) and W H Randall was constructed at Sittingbourne in 1876 (44 Reg Tons). Kathleen was a little larger at 53 tons. The Virgilia was steel built, registered at 5,697 tons. All three barges re-entered service. The Why Not, had previously survived an incident in 1917 when she has been hit by a 2-seater aircraft from the Royal Flying Corps No.63 Squadron from the airfield at Joyce Green Isolation Hospital, the Kathleen rendered assistance.

She was converted to an auxiliary in 1945, launched again as a sailing barge in 1953 then turned into a full motor barge in 1954.

In 1944, the Kathleen was in Whitstable for a refit and was spotted by Edgar March, the naval historian. He used the opportunity to make a full survey of the Kathleen, making notes and producing five sides of engineering drawings of her, and commenting on the sails and the rigging. This was published in 1948, making her one of the most thoroughly recorded barges. In 1946 the auxiliary engine was fitted, and the cabin detailed by March was changed.

Daniels Brothers barges in 1949
Name	Built	Year	Tons	Official no.	Notes
Azima of Faversham	Whitstable	1898	50	104941	
Kathleen of Rochester	Gravesend	1901	53	113708	
Lord Churchill of Faversham	Littlehampton	1888	60	94389	
Nellie of Faversham	Faversham	1901	43	114452	
Savoy of Dover	Rochester	1898	699	105555	
Trilby of Dover	Sandwich	1896	53	91829	
Violet of Maldon	Malden	1889	45	96482	
Ref	As of 1951				

On the night of the Great Storm of 1953- the night the tide came in and didn't go out, Kathleen was on the slipway at Anderson, Rigden and Perkins yard, Island Wall, Whitstable. She was washed up and demolished the slipway and many buildings in the shipyard, ending up at right angles to the slip, A special temporary slip had to be built in order to launch her again.

By 1954 the Kathleen was relying increasingly in her engine, and her sprit and mainmast were removed. The top mast was lowered into the mastcase. The rigging had become a hindrance when loading cargo, so in September she had a leg of mutton, trysail bent to the topmast. The Kathleen was a Whitstable barge sailing for Daniels: the port was in decline and on the death of the owner, the remaining barges were sold to the London and Rochester Trading Company Ltd. Though there were forty-two freights in 1958 they were mainly part loads. Fred Wraight Jnr left the boat in 1960- she took her last cargo in October 1961, her engine was removed, and she was laid up and decommissioned at Strood on 23 November 1961.

The grain barge from 1901 to 1926

1926–1946: Rigged without a bowsprit

1946–1954: Rigged with auxiliary engine

1954–1960: Motor barge

1961–1965: A lighter without sails or motor

=== Barge yacht ===
She was re-rigged as a barge yacht at Heybridge in 1965. Parts for the work, came from all over the region. The topsail and a foresail came from Lower Halstow, the mast case came from Pin Mill from the hulk of the Charles Hutton. Many blocks came from Reuben Wests barge yard. The mizzen spars and leeboard winches of the Dorothy, came from Cubitt's Yard the main horse was the fore horse from the Orinoco. The main mast and the standing rigging came from Erith, from the Lady Mary, built in 1900 as an F.T. Everard's coaster. A leeboard was made from a wood called keruing, another was borrowed, and in 1966 the mainsail was lent by the Nellie Parker, In 1967, Kathleen raced using a mainsail lent by the Venta.

She had a new owner, Pat Murphy who invested in a new mainsail and a pair of Kelvin 44 hp diesels.

She was sold and moved to the Netherlands in 1975 where she served as a motor-sailor houseboat with a six-cylinder diesel. She was finally hulked in 1983 near Spaarndam. Her engine and shafts were removed to use in a ketch yacht in Amsterdam by Jan Witterman, her spars and fitting were removed and used in the 1981 restoration of the Wyvenhoe.

== Construction ==
Thames barges were built for strength. They had flat bottoms to allow them to be easily beached or lie on the river mud, and were rigged to allow them to be operated by two men and possibly a lad. They were built in bargeyards adjacent to a river or creek on bargeblocks- a series of trestles raised about a metre from the compacted ground, that allowed working access above and below. Kathleen was built at Gravesend in 1901. Over time her rig was changed to suit commercial conditions.

The keel was a 12 by 4 inches (30 by 10 cm) piece of elm. It was broader than it was deep and 82.8 feet (25.2 m) long. At the bow the stempost was raised vertically and at the stern the sternpost, these were made from 6 feet (1.8 m) lengths of 12 by 9 inches (30 by 23 cm) English oak. The apron and the inner sternpost were strengthening timbers. The fore and aft deadwood would raise the floors to give shape at the bow and the sweep to the fashion timbers of the transom. Across the keel and deadwood were laid the 'floors', these were 8 by 6 inches (20 by 15 cm) oak timbers at 20 inches (51 cm) centres. The length of each floor would be taken of a half hull model, most would be 19.7 feet (6.0 m) long, the same length as her beam. On top of the floors, on top of the keel, on earlier barges was bolted a massive Oregon pine 14 by 14 inches (36 by 36 cm) keelson. This used 1 inch (2.5 cm) iron bolts. On the Kathleen the keelson was a made of a 49 feet (15 m) steel section, in profile similar to railway line (6 by 11 inches (15 by 28 cm)): it was cheaper but could distort. The keelson would be scarfed into the apron and deadwood and would be shorter than the keel. There were equivalent stemsons and sternsons.

The futtocks (side-frames) were dovetailed onto the end of each floor, and every other joint was strengthened with an iron angle plate. The futtocks were of 8 by 6 inches (20 by 15 cm) oak and of varying length averaging 6 feet (1.8 m). Temporary cross-poles were used to hold the ends of the futtocks in place. The barge was now 'in frame', and the shipwright approved the lines. Ribbands were temporarily nailed to the outside of the frames to hold this position. The inner angle between the floor and the futtocks were stiffened by inner chines or chine keelsons, made of a single piece of 12 by 6 inches (30 by 15 cm) pitch pine This was bolted to each floor and futtock. Above it was a 12 by 3 inches (30.5 by 7.6 cm) oak stringer that was bolted to the futtocks and led out to stem and stern post.

=== Ceilings and linings ===
The ceilings were now laid on the floors. These would be pine planks 3 inches (7.6 cm) thick, and as wide as available. The height of the deck was marked on the frames- forming a beam-line, and a beam thickness beneath it, a 15 by 4 inches (38 by 10 cm) oak inwale was bolted to the futtocks. The inside of the hold was lined with 2 inches (5.1 cm) thick pine. The inwale formed a ledge on which the 8 by 8 inches (20 by 20 cm) curved beams of the deck, and the carlings rested. The two large holds made it impossible to use deckbeams alone. There were three beams afore the forehold, three beams under the mast-case between the holds, two between the mainhold and the companionway to the cabin, two supporting the transom. On the Kathleen, the port and starboard decks were of differing widths.

=== The rig ===
Sails on a Thames barge

When she was built, the Kathleen had a bowsprit, main mast and a mizzen mast. She was rigged with spritsails on both masts and a topsail on the main. She was rerigged in 1926 without a bowsprit. In 1946 she lost her mizzen when an engine was added. In 1954 her rig was reduced to that of a motor barge- and from 1961 to 1965 she was used as a lighter, with engine and mast stripped away. When she was converted to a barge yacht for the 1966, 1967 sailing races, her rig was similar to that in 1926.

=== Spars ===
The mainmast was made of 11-inch (28 cm) spruce; it was 40 feet (12 m) to the head, and it was 35 feet (11 m) to the hounds. The 10 1/2-inch-diameter (27 cm) sprit was 59 feet (18 m). The 7 1/2-inch (19 cm)topmast was 39 feet 6 inches (12.04 m) to the hounds; it had a 4-foot-6-inch (1.37 m) pole, and a 9-foot (2.7 m) headstick.

The 6-inch (15 cm) mizzen mast was 17 feet (5.2 m) to the head. The 6-inch-diameter (15 cm) sprit was 24 feet (7.3 m), and the 4-inch-diameter (10 cm) boom was 14 feet (4.3 m). The 7-inch (18 cm) bowsprit was 22 feet 6 inches (6.86 m) with 14 feet (4.3 m) outboard.

=== Standing rigging ===
She was rigged with 3-inch (7.6 cm) shrouds.

=== Sails ===
The mainsail was 27 feet 3 inches (8.31 m) (weather), by 34 feet 6 inches (10.52 m)(head) with a lee of 49 feet 0 inches (14.94 m) and a of foot 35 feet 6 inches (10.82 m), giving a sail area of 285 square yards (238 m^{2}).

The topsail was 34 feet (10 m) (weather), with a lee of 34 feet (10 m) and a of foot 31 feet (9.4 m), giving a sail area of 128 square yards (107 m^{2}). The foresail was 31 feet (9.4 m) (weather), with a lee of 30 feet (9.1 m) and a of foot 26 feet (7.9 m), giving a sail area of 91 1/2 square yards (76.5 m^{2}). The jib was 42 feet (13 m) (weather), with a lee of 28 feet (8.5 m) and a foot of 18 feet 4 inches (5.59 m). Her jib topsails were 48 feet (15 m) (weather), with a lee of 33 feet (10 m) and a foot of 21 feet (6.4 m), giving a sail area of 55 square yards (46 m^{2}), and a lighter set with 56 feet (17 m) (weather), with a lee of 38 feet (12 m) and a of foot 24 feet 6 inches (7.47 m), giving a sail area of 72 square yards (60 m^{2}).

Her mizzen was 13 feet 6 inches (4.11 m) (weather), by 12 feet 0 inches (3.66 m) (head) with a lee of 23 feet 6 inches (7.16 m) and a foot of 13 feet 6 inches (4.11 m), giving a sail area of 285 square yards (238 m^{2}).

The sails on a Thames barge are red ochre in colour. The sailcloth is of flax, and to be kept in a supple and waterproof condition it must be dressed. Importantly, the flax must not dry out or will chafe against the rigging or against the brails when not in use. The sailmakers exact formula is a closely guarded secret, and sailormen believe that some dressings are faster than others. It is based on red-ochre (protects against UV) suspended in a mixture of fish oils, linseed oil, seawater and horse urine. On conversion Dilberry's formula was used.

== Models ==
There are three models of the Kathleen (1901) in the ship collection of the National Maritime Museum in Greenwich. Only one of them is on display though. It is to be found in the exhibition space in Chatham Historic Dockyard.
