= Michigan Bluff, California =

Unincorporated community in California, United States

Michigan Bluff
- Unincorporated community
- Location in California Michigan Bluff (the United States)
- Coordinates: 39°02′35″N 120°44′29″W
- Country: United States
- State: California
- County: Placer County
- Elevation: 3,510 ft (1,070 m)

California Historical Landmark
- Reference no.: 402

Michigan Bluff (formerly, Michigan Bluffs and Michigan City) is an unincorporated community in Placer County, California. Michigan Bluff is 4.35 miles (7.0 km) east-northeast of Foresthill. It is at an elevation of 3,510 feet (1,070 m).

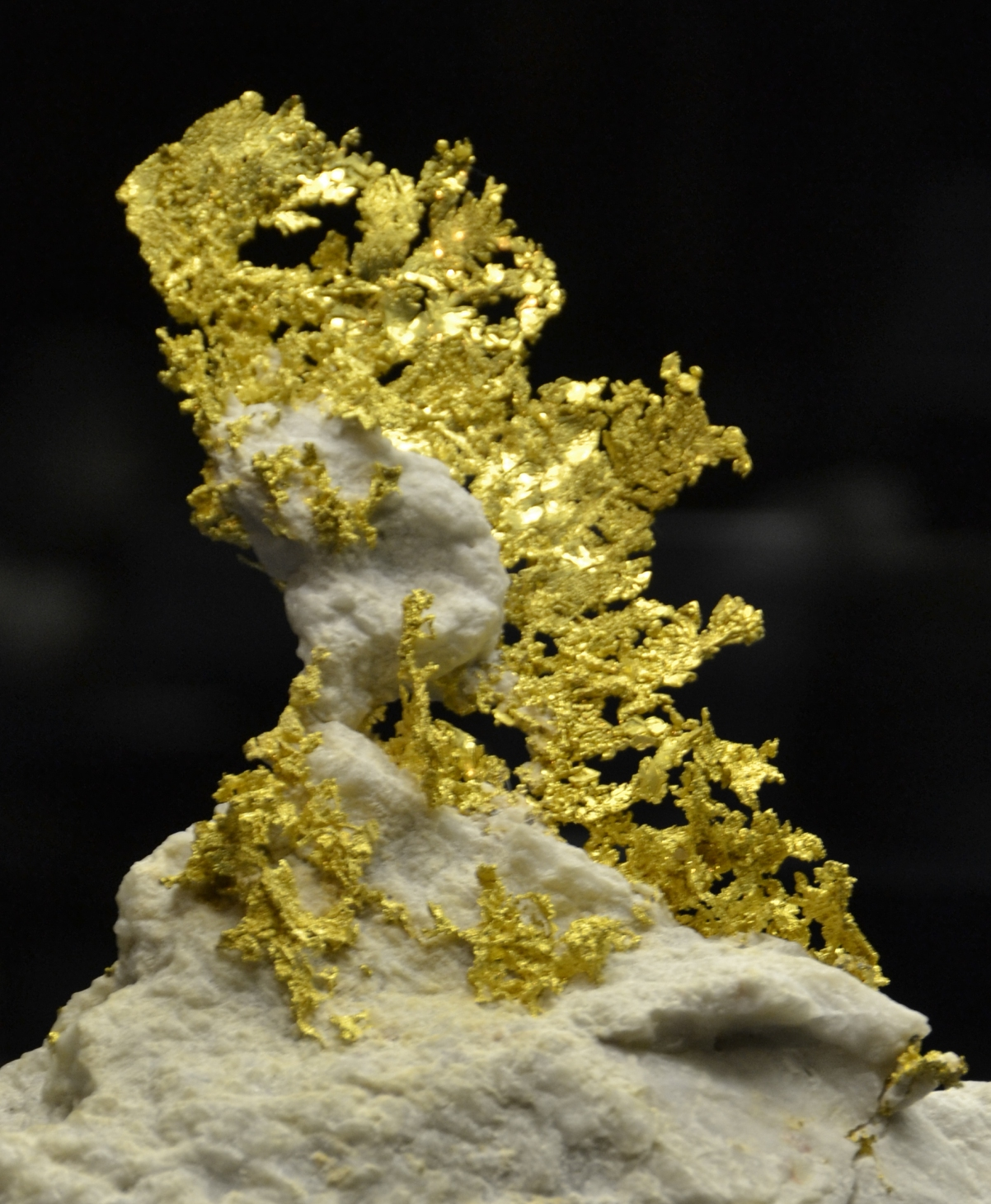
Gold found in Michigan Bluff

The original settlement was called Michigan City, but after erosion threatened the town it was moved up-slope and renamed Michigan Bluff. The Michigan City post office operated from 1854 to 1943.

Photo of a monument in Michigan Bluff, California

The town was founded by gold miners. Mining began in earnest in 1853, and town was shipping $100,000 in gold per month by 1858. Leland Stanford ran a store in the town from 1853 to 1855. After hydraulic mining was banned, the town entered decline. The town is now registered as California Historical Landmark #402.
