= Corrido =

Mexican narrative musical tradition

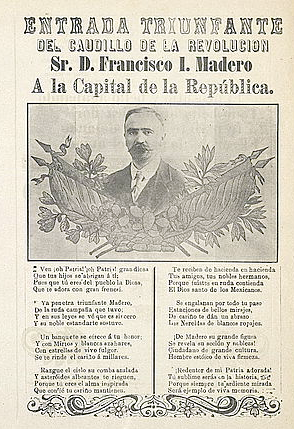
Corrido broadside celebrating the entry of Francisco I. Madero into Mexico City in 1911.

A corrido (Spanish pronunciation: [koˈriðo]) is a narrative metrical tale and poetry that forms a ballad. The songs often feature topics such as oppression, history, daily life for criminals, the vaquero lifestyle, and other socially relevant themes. Corridos were widely popular during the Mexican Revolution and in the Southwestern American frontier as it was also a part of the development of Tejano and New Mexico music, which later influenced Western music.

The genre derives mainly from the romance and, in its most known form, consists of a salutation from the singer, a prologue to the story, the story itself, and a moral and farewell from the singer. In Mexico, it is still a popular genre today.

Outside Mexico, corridos are popular in Chilean national celebrations of Fiestas Patrias.

== Form ==
Corridos, like rancheras, have introductory instrumental music and adornos (ornamentations), accommodating the stanzas of the lyrics. Like rancheras, corridos can be played in virtually all regional Mexican styles. Also, like rancheras, corridos are usually played in march, waltz, or mazurka mode.

== History ==
The word corrido comes from the Spanish word correr ("to run"). A typical corrido's formula is eight quatrains with four to six lines containing eight syllables.

The earliest living specimens of corrido are adapted versions of Spanish romances or European tales, mainly about disgraced or idealized love or religious topics. These, which include (among others) "La Martina" (an adaptation of the romance "La Esposa Infiel") and "La Delgadina", show the same basic stylistic features of the later mainstream corridos (1/2 or 3/4 tempo and verso menor lyric composing, meaning verses of eight or less phonetic syllables, grouped in strophes of six or fewer verses).

1. La Cucaracha (chorus only)
Performed by Sean Buss & Elisa

Beginning with the Mexican War of Independence (1810–1821) and culminating during the Mexican Revolution (1910–1921), the genre flourished and acquired its "epic" tones, along with the three-step narrative structure. The academic study of corridos written during the Revolution shows that they were used to communicate news throughout Mexico as a response to the propaganda being spread in the newspapers, which the corrupt government of Porfirio Díaz owned. Sheet music of popular corridos was sold or included in publications. Other corrido sheets were passed out free as a form of propaganda to eulogize leaders, armies, and political movements or, in some cases, to mock the opposition. The best-known Revolutionary corrido is "La Cucaracha", an old song rephrased to celebrate the exploits of Pancho Villa's army and poke fun at his nemesis Victoriano Huerta.

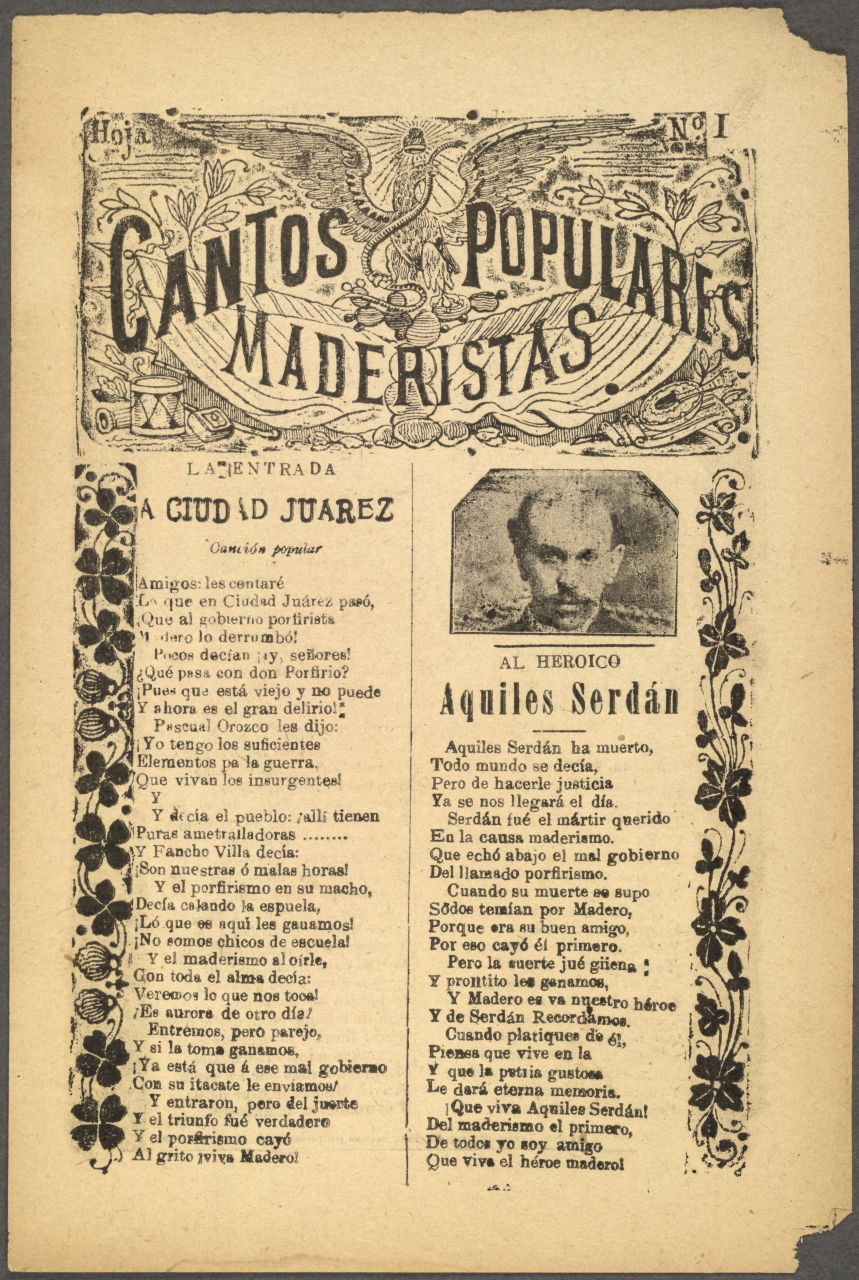
Song about the battle of Ciudad Juarez titled Toma de Ciudad Juárez

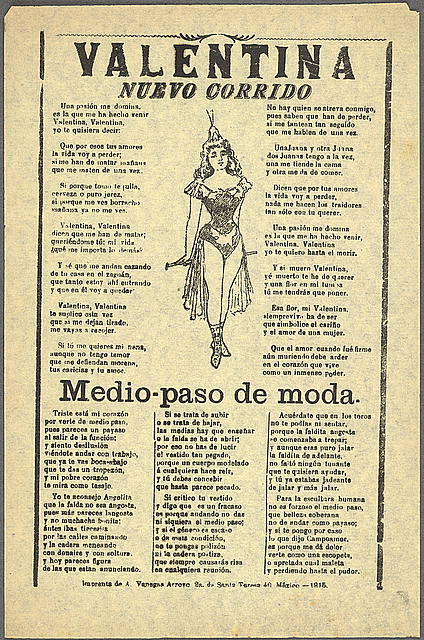
Corrido sheet music from 1915, at the height of the Mexican Revolution

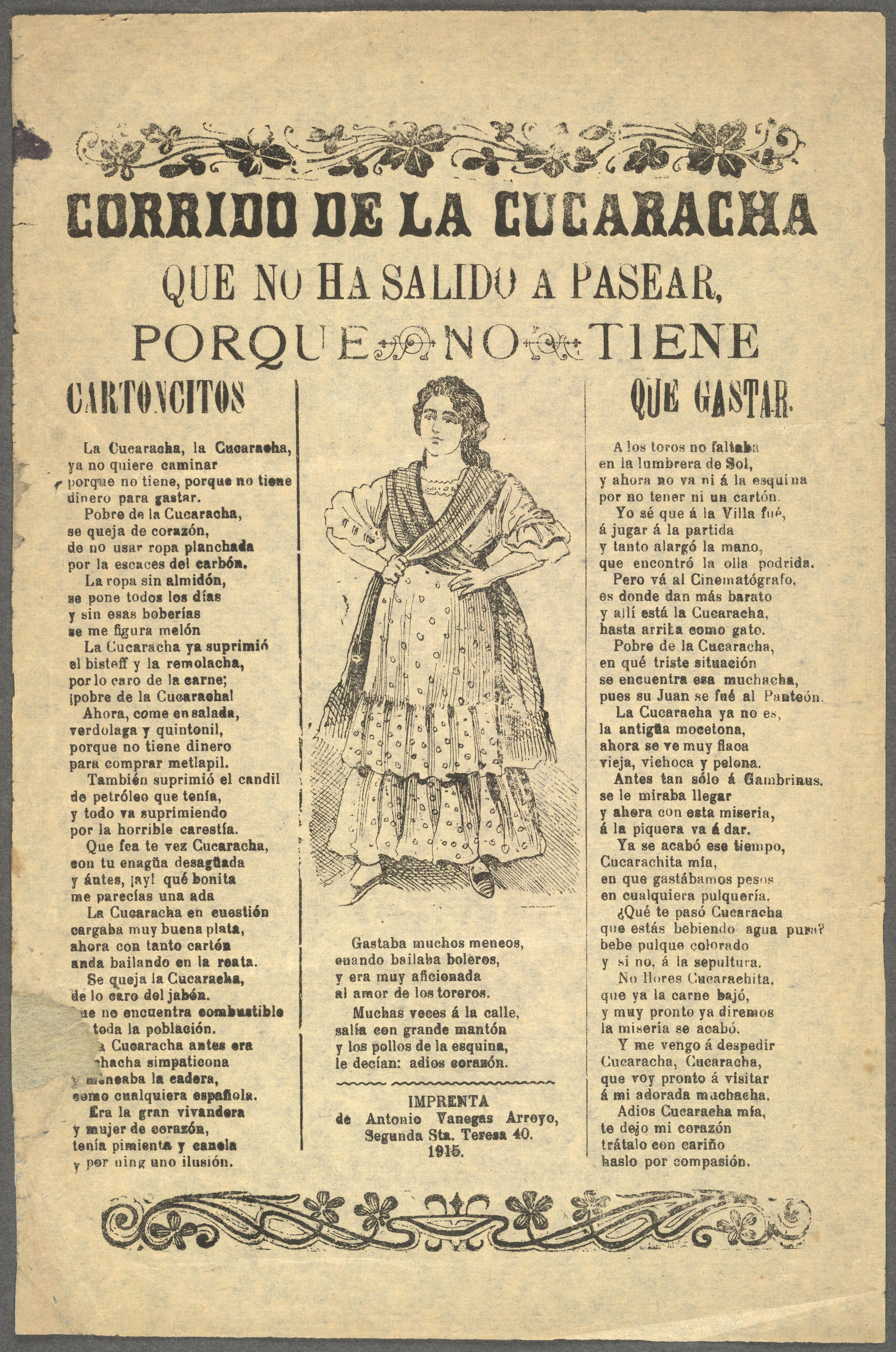
A contemporary corrido song sheet of "La cucaracha" issued during the Mexican Revolution. Note the original lyrics and the reference to cartoncitos, a scrip issued as pay.

Before the widespread use of radio, popular corridos were passed around as an oral tradition, often to spread news of events (for example, "La cárcel de Cananea") and famous heroes and humour to the population, many of whom were illiterate before the post-Revolution improvements to the educational system. Until the arrival and success of electronic mass media in the mid-20th century, the corrido served in Mexico as the leading informational and educational outlet, even with subversive purposes, due to an apparent linguistic and musical simplicity that lent itself to oral transmission. After the spread of radio and television, the genre evolved into a new stage and is still in maturation. However, some scholars have disputed this notion and consider the corrido to be a dead or moribund art form.

"Soy zapatista del Edo. de Morelos" ("I'm a Zapatista from the State of Morelos"), an example of a southern corrido written during the Mexican Revolution about the war, written by Marciano Silva.

With the consolidation of "Presidencialismo" (the political era following the Mexican Revolution) and the success of electronic mass media, corridos lost their primacy as a form of mass communication, becoming part of a folklorist cult in one branch and, in another, the voice of the new subversives: oppressed workers, drug growers or traffickers, leftist activists and emigrated farm workers (mainly to the United States). Scholars designate this as the "decaying" stage of the genre, which tends to erase the stylistic or structural characteristics of "revolutionary" or traditional corrido without a clear and unified understanding of its evolution. This is mainly signified by the "narcocorrido", many of which are egocentric ballads paid for by drug smugglers to anonymous and almost illiterate composers, but with others coming from the most popular norteño and banda artists and written by some of the most successful and influential ranchera composers.

In more rural areas, where Spanish and Mexican cultures have been preserved because of isolation, romantic works have also taken on other forms related to the corrido. In New Mexico, for example, a story-song emerged during the colonial period known as an Indita, which loosely follows the format of a corrido, but is chanted rather than sung, similar to a Native American chant, hence they are called Inditas.

Some corridos are love stories. These are not exclusively male; there are also corridos about women, such as "La Venganza de Maria", "Laurita Garza", "El Corrido de Rosita Alvirez" and "La Adelita", or couples, such as "La Fama de la Pareja" sung by Los Tigres del Norte. Some even employ fictional stories invented by their composers.

In the Mestizo-Mexican cultural area, the three variants of corrido (romance, revolutionary and modern) are both alive and sung, along with popular sister narrative genres, such as the "valona" of Michoacán state, the "son arribeño" of the Sierra Gorda (Guanajuato, Hidalgo and Querétaro states) and others. Its vitality and flexibility allow original corrido lyrics to be built on non-Mexican musical genres, such as blues and ska, or with non-Spanish lyrics, like the famous song "El Paso" by Marty Robbins, and corridos composed or translated by Mexican indigenous communities or by the "Chicano" people in the United States, in English or "Spanglish". The corrido was, for example, a favourite device employed by the Teatro Campesino led by Luis Valdez in mobilizing predominantly Mexican and Mexican-American farmworkers in California during the 1960s.

Corridos have seen a renaissance in the 21st century. Contemporary corridos feature contemporary themes such as drug trafficking (narcocorridos), immigration, migrant labour, and the chupacabra.

== Subcategories ==
=== Narcocorridos ===
Modern artists have created a modern twist to the historical corridos. This new type of corridos is called narcocorridos ("drug ballads"). The earliest form of corridos emerged in the Mexican Revolution and told stories of revolutionary leaders and battles. Narcocorridos typically use accurate dates and places to tell mainly stories of drug smuggling, including violence, murder, poverty, corruption, and crime.

The border zone of Rio Grande has been credited with being the birthplace of narcocorridos. This began in the 1960s with the fast growth of drug empires in the border states of Mexico and the United States. As drug lords grew in influence, people idolized them and began to show their respect and admiration through narcocorridos.

There are two main types of narcocorridos: commercial corridos and private corridos. Commercial narcocorridos are recorded by famous artists who idolize a specific drug dealer and release a song about him, while the drug dealer usually commissions private narcocorridos. While commercial corridos are available to the public, private narcocorridos are restricted to nightclubs that are frequently attended by drug dealers or through CDs bought on the street. Drug lords often pay singers to write songs about them to send a message to rivals. These songs are found to be most popular on YouTube; many have a banner "Approved by the cartel". These types of corridos are changing from the formula historical and typical corridos would usually take. A first-person voice is now being sung instead of the historic third-person point of view.

The Mexican government has tried to ban narcocorridos because of their explicit and controversial lyrics. Most of the Mexican public argues that crimes and violence are to blame for narcocorridos. However, despite the efforts of the Mexican government to ban narcocorridos, the northern states of Mexico can still get access to these songs through US radio stations whose signal still reaches the conditions of the north of Mexico. Narcocorridos are also widely available on websites like YouTube and iHeartRadio. Today, narcocorridos are popular in Latin American countries like Bolivia, Colombia, Peru, Guatemala and Honduras.

Narcocorridos has grown in popularity in the United States, and the American public has targeted them. More recent narcocorridos are even targeted towards the American people; some are even written in English. Like many artists, narcocorrido singers have chosen American cities to perform concerts because the American public can buy concert tickets for a higher price than the average Mexican citizen.

=== Corridos tumbados ===
"Corridos tumbados" or "trap corridos" are corrido ballads influenced by hip hop and Latin trap. Largely popularized by Natanael Cano, the idea to fuse the two genres was proposed by Dan Sanchez, who wrote Natanael's first corrido tumbado, "Soy El Diablo", which later saw a remix featuring popular reggaeton and trap rapper Bad Bunny. Other prominent artists include Peso Pluma, Fuerza Regida and Junior H. Many corrido tumbado artists cite Ariel Camacho as one of their main influences.

Since 2023, this subgenre of corridos saw a major boom on the mainstream scene all around the world, with popular artists appearing on songs. These artists include Eladio Carrión, Myke Towers and Argentinian producer Bizarrap, who released a music session with Peso Pluma, which became a major hit. As corridos tumbados became popular around the world, major artists from the American hip-hop scene like Drake, Travis Scott and Lil Baby have been seen with acts from corridos tumbados. In Mexico, the genre has been controversial for some lyrics pertaining to "violent themes" including drug criminals.

== Gregorio Cortez ==
The corrido "The Ballad of Gregorio Cortez" narrates the story of Gregorio Cortez, who fought against 33 Texas Rangers from June 12 to June 22, 1901 and became a folk hero amongst people along the Texas-Mexico border. Cortez was described as "a man who never raised his voice to the parent or elder brother and never disobeyed." Most of the story is no different from his real life, but the report calls him a sharpshooter, and his brother Romaldo was renamed Román.

On June 12, 1901, sheriff W.T. Morris came to Cortez and Román to investigate a horse theft and asked if they traded a horse. Gregorio said "no" and told Morris that he had a mare. After a while, Morris assumed Cortez and Romaldo were lying and attempted to arrest them. However, when Morris tried to arrest the brothers, Cortez stood up to him, saying in Spanish "You can't arrest me for nothing". Relying on poor Spanish translations from his fellow Texas Rangers, Morris misinterpreted Cortez' as saying "No white man can arrest me" and shot Ronaldo, wounding him. Cortez shot Morris in retaliation and headed towards the Austin-Gonzales vicinity.

In the corrido, instead of Romaldo being wounded, his counterpart Román is shot dead trying to protect Cortez and collapses on the ground, and Cortez shoots the sheriff to avenge his brother. He walks 100 miles and rides more than 400 miles. He walks until he reaches the Rio Grande. As he arrives in Goliad, Texas, he meets with his friend Jesús González (referred to as "El Teco"), who betrays him and turns him in to the police. This results in Cortez being arrested, put on trial, and sentenced to "ninety-nine years and a day" in federal prison for horse theft, even though he never stole a horse.

The corrido has been adapted in other media. In 1958, Américo Paredes wrote the book With His Pistol in His Hand: A Border Ballad and Its Hero. This book details the corrido and the story of Gregorio Cortes in detail. It has become a "classic of Mexican-American prose." In 1982, a film titled The Ballad of Gregorio Cortez was created, and Edward James Olmos starred as Gregorio Cortez.

== Films ==
- 2006 – Al Otro Lado (To the Other Side). Directed by Natalia Almada.
- 2007 – El Violin (The Violin) Directed by Francisco Vargas.
- 2008 – El chrysler 300: Chuy y Mauricio Directed by Enrique Murillo.
- 2009 – El Katch (The Katch) Directed by Oscar Lopez.

== See also ==
- Tambora Sinaloense
- Duranguense
