= Volcanoville, California =

Unincorporated community in California, United States

Volcanoville
- Unincorporated community
- Location in California Volcanoville (the United States)
- Coordinates: 38°58′55″N 120°47′21″W
- Country: United States
- State: California
- County: El Dorado
- Elevation: 2,992 ft (912 m)

Volcanoville is an unincorporated community in El Dorado County, California, United States. It is located 6 miles (9.7 km) north-northeast of Georgetown, at an elevation of 2992 feet (912 m).

A post office operated at Volcanoville from 1930 to 1953. The name is due to early miners' mistaken belief that a nearby mountain was an extinct volcano.

== Education ==
The Black Oak Mine Unified School District serves Garden Valley.

== Mosquito Fire ==
Several structures in Volcanoville were destroyed in the Mosquito Fire, a large, destructive wildfire that burned near the community of Foresthill in the Tahoe and Eldorado National Forests in Placer and El Dorado counties in California in September and October 2022.
