= Valona, California =

Unincorporated community in California, United States

Valona
- Unincorporated community
- Location in California
- Coordinates: 38°03′08″N 122°13′28″W
- Country: United States
- State: California
- County: Contra Costa
- Elevation: 62 ft (19 m)
- GNIS ID: 236987
- FIPS code: 06-81946

Valona is an unincorporated community in Contra Costa County, California, United States. It is located in the bluffs above Crockett, 5.5 miles (9 km) west-northwest of Martinez, at an elevation of 62 feet (19 m). The similar village of Selby is located nearby. The ZIP Code is 94525. The community is inside area codes 510 and 341.
