= Virgilia, California =

Unincorporated community in California, United States

Virgilia
- Unincorporated community
- Location in California Virgilia (the United States)
- Coordinates: 40°01′07″N 121°06′20″W
- Country: United States
- State: California
- County: Plumas
- Elevation: 2,782 ft (848 m)

Virgilia is an unincorporated community in Plumas County, California, United States. It lies at an elevation of 2782 feet (848 m). Virgilia is located 2 miles (3.2 km) west of Twain.

The Virgilia post office operated from 1929 to 1965. The name honors Virgilia Bogue, daughter of railroad executive Virgil Bogue.
