= Boles Fire =

2014 wildfire in Northern California

- Part of the 2014 California wildfires
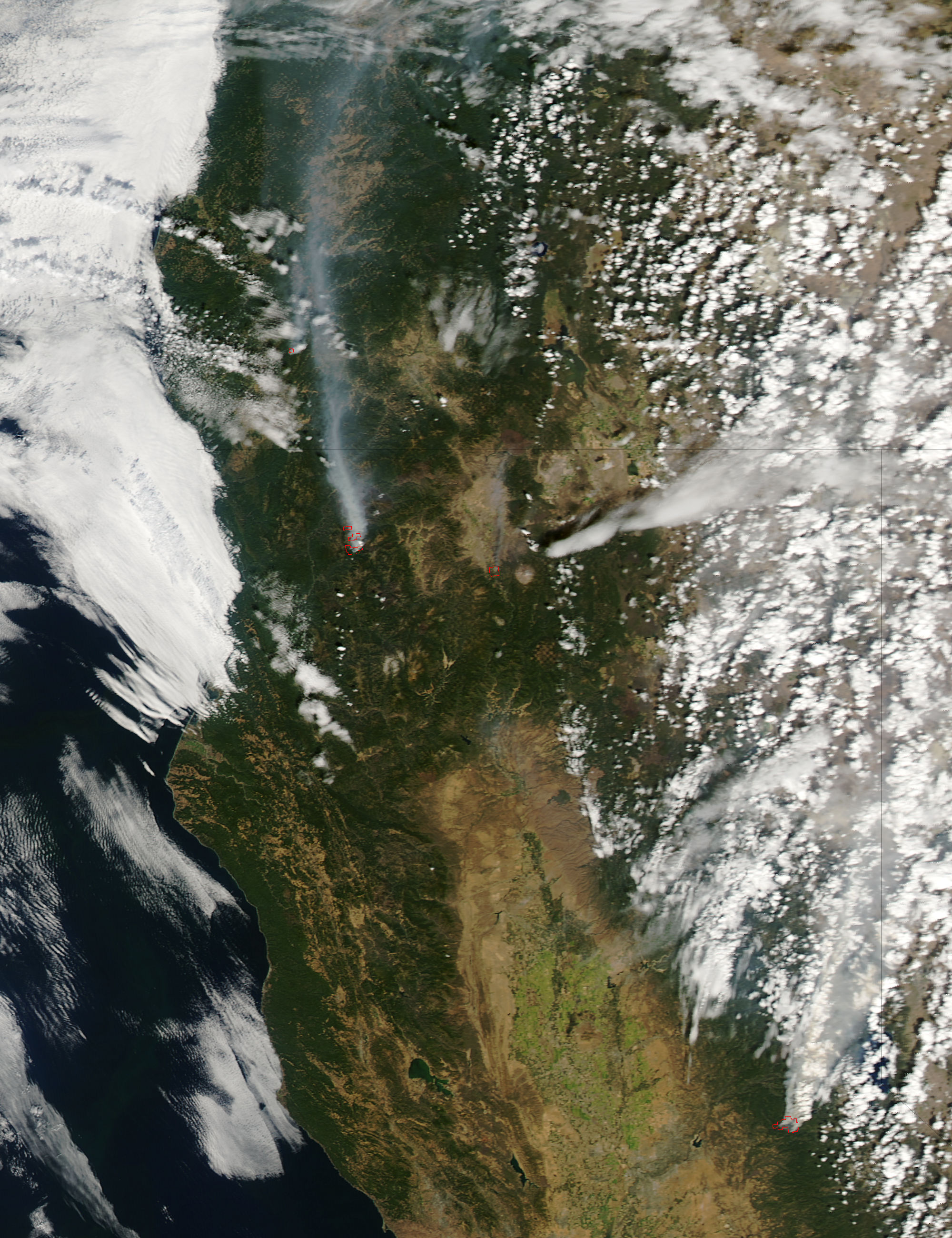
- The small plume of the Boles Fire is visible between snowless Mount Shasta and the plume of the Happy Camp Complex Fire.
- Date: September 15, 2014 –; September 20, 2014
- Location: Weed, Siskiyou County, California
- Coordinates: 41.42384°N 122.37432°W

Statistics
- Burned area: 479 acres (194 ha)

Impacts
- Injuries: 1
- Structures lost: 150 residences; 8 commercial structures

Map
- Location of fire in California

The Boles Fire was a wildfire that burned in Siskiyou County during mid-September 2014. On September 15, at 1:38 p.m. PDT, the Boles Fire ignited near Weed, California. Later on the same day, at 10:30 p.m. PDT, the Boles Fire was reported at 350 acres and 15% containment. Over 100 structures were reported damaged or destroyed on that day. Later that day, the wildfire was reported at nearly 100% containment; however, this report turned out to be erroneous. On September 16, the Boles Fire had burned 375 acres (152 ha) and was only 20% contained. It also destroyed 150 residences and forced the evacuation of 1,500 people in Weed and Siskiyou County.

During the next couple of days, the Boles Fire increased to 479 acres (194 ha), before finally being fully contained on September 20. The wildfire also caused 1 injury. The Boles Fire destroyed a total of 150 residential structures and 8 nonresidential commercial properties, while damaging 4 single residences and 3 nonresidential commercial properties. As of 2015, the damage caused by the Boles Fire is unknown.

The cause of the wildfire was reported as "under investigation" in 2015. As of December 5, 2014, Ronald Beau Marshall was subject to a preliminary hearing after being charged with arson in the Boles Fire case. In 2015, he was sentenced to three years in prison for recklessly starting the fire; he was released from prison in 2016.
