= Etiwanda Fire =

2014 wildfire in Southern California

- Part of the 2014 California wildfires
- Date: April 30, 2014 –; May 5, 2014
- Location: San Bernardino National Forest, San Bernardino County, California
- Coordinates: 34.169346°N 117.547374°W

Statistics
- Burned area: 2,143 acres (9 km^{2})

Impacts
- Injuries: 3 firefighters

Ignition
- Cause: Escaped illegal campfire

Map
- Location within southern California

The Etiwanda Fire was a wildfire in the San Bernardino National Forest in the foothills north of Rancho Cucamonga. The fire started on April 30, 2014, during Santa Ana wind conditions of high temperatures and strong winds. On the first day, four schools and more than 1,500 homes were evacuated; residential evacuation orders were canceled that evening. Nine schools were closed on May 1, but they all were reopened on May 2. Many nearby communities were warned of unhealthy air quality. It burned 2,143 acres (867 ha) and was fully contained on May 10. The Etiwanda Fire was caused by an escaped illegal campfire.
