= Poinsettia Fire =

2014 wildfire in Southern California

- Part of the May 2014 San Diego County wildfires
- Date: May 14, 2014 –; May 17, 2014
- Location: Carlsbad, San Diego County, California

Statistics
- Burned area: 600 acres (2 km^{2})

Impacts
- Deaths: 1
- Structures destroyed: 8 residences; 18-unit complex
- Cost: $22.5 million (2014 USD)

Ignition
- Cause: Undetermined

The Poinsettia Fire was the second most destructive of the May 2014 San Diego County wildfires. It caused property damage estimated at $22.5 million, as well as the only reported fatality in the San Diego County series of wildfires. As of July 10, 2014, the cause of the fire is listed as "undetermined", which allows for further investigation if more information comes to light.

== Fire ==
The Poinsettia Fire started on May 14, around 10:40 AM PDT, in the city of Carlsbad. Burning in dry brush north of El Camino Real, it began near the intersection of Poinsettia Lane and Alicante. After the fire crossed El Camino Real, evacuation orders were issued to 11,600 homes and businesses in Carlsbad. Two elementary schools and a middle school were also evacuated. By the end of the day on May 14, the fire had destroyed eight homes, an 18-unit condominium complex, and two commercial buildings. The Carlsbad Unified School District closed all schools May 15 and 16.

At 5 PM PDT on May 14, the fire covered more than 400 acres (160 ha). Firefighters said they had stopped its spread, but it was only 10% contained and additional structures were threatened. By May 16, the fire had burned 400 acres (160 ha) and was 85% contained. The increased containment let to the lifting of all evacuation orders. Later that day the fire was reported to be 100% contained, after reaching a size of 600 acres (240 ha).

During the evening of May 15, firefighters found a badly burned body near the site of a known transient encampment in Carlsbad. The victim has not been identified, and the cause of death has not yet been determined.

== Cause and lawsuit ==
No official cause for the fire has been determined, however multiple theories exist. What is known is that the fire started on the 7th hole of the La Costa Resort and Spa's golf course. Speculation points to cigarette or cigar being thrown into the dry grass along the course. A report from the Carlsbad Fire Department has also speculated that the blaze may have been ignited by a spark from golf club striking a rock.

In October 2014, a group of businesses, homeowners, renters, and those injured during the fire, sued the resort, claiming it was responsible for the fire citing "negligent maintenance and operation of its property and equipment".

== See also ==
- October 2017 California wildfires
- 2014 California wildfires
- December 2017 Southern California wildfires
