= Meadow Fire =

2014 wildfire in Yosemite National Park

- Part of the 2014 California wildfires
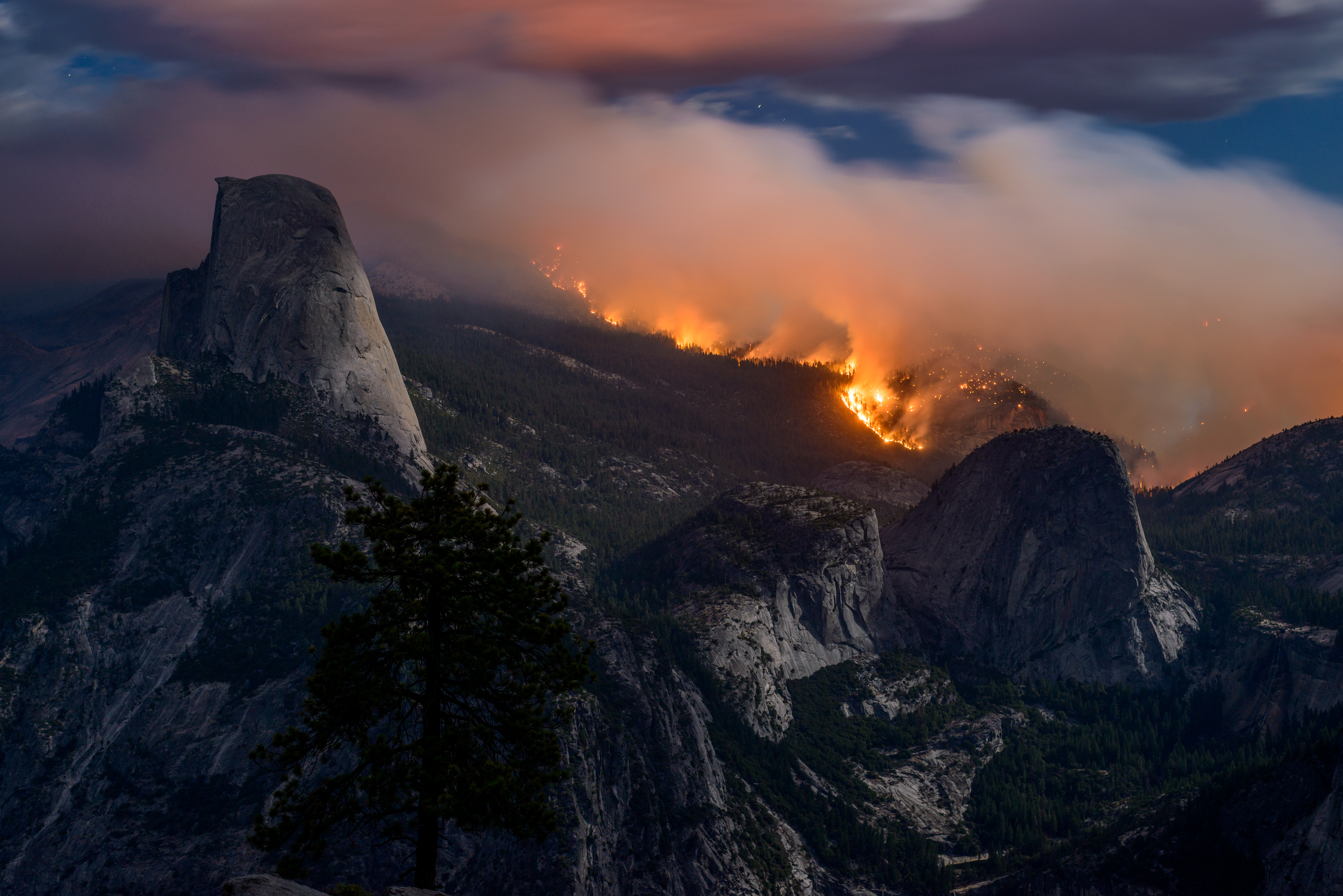
- The Meadow Fire on September 7, 2014, during the late afternoon hours.
- Date: July 19, 2014 –; September 29, 2014
- Location: Little Yosemite Valley, California
- Coordinates: 37.712°N 119.509°W

Statistics
- Burned area: 4,971 acres (20 km^{2})

Ignition
- Cause: Lightning

Map
- Location within California

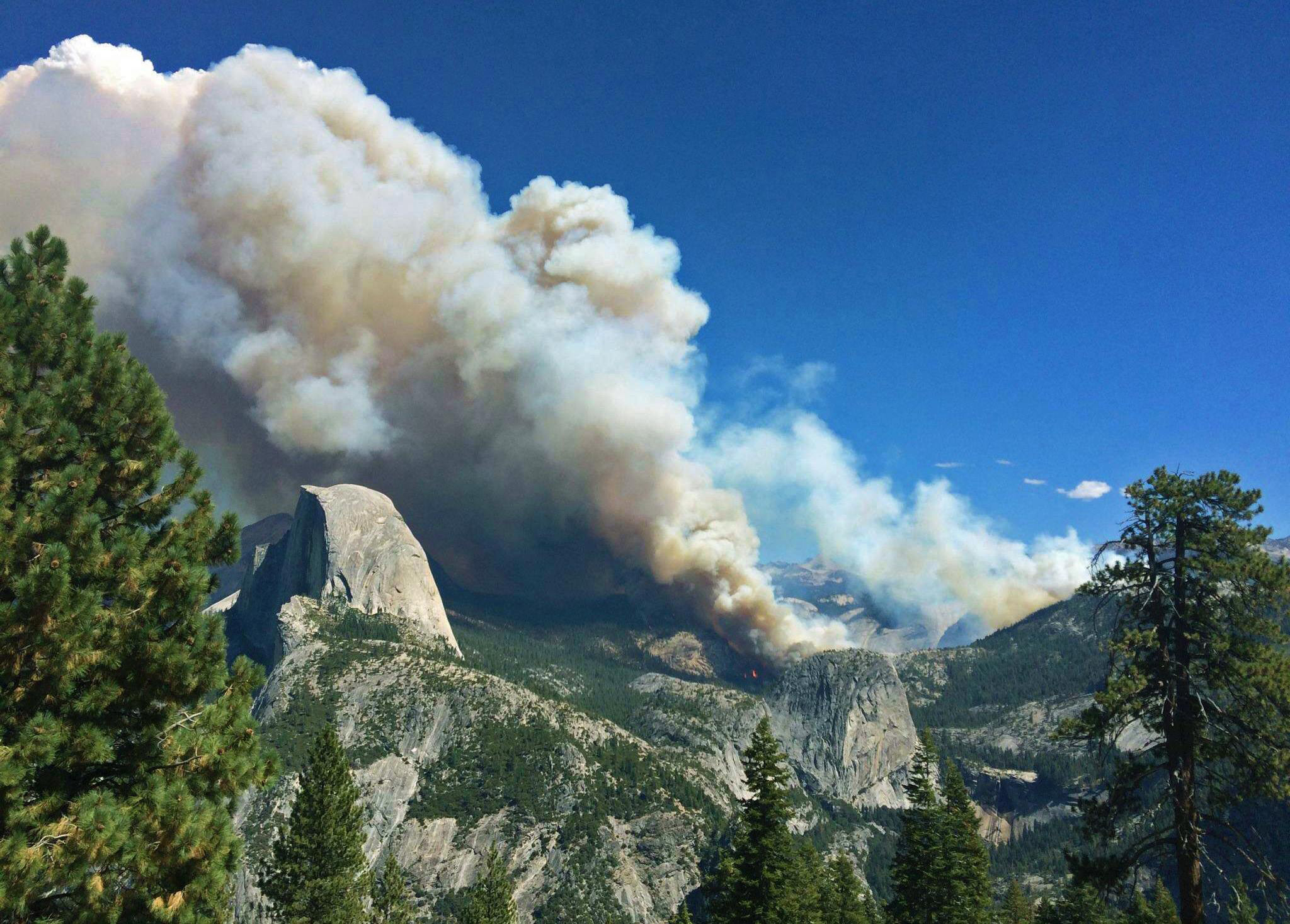
The Meadow Fire burning in Yosemite Valley, on September 7, 2014

The Meadow Fire was a wildfire which burned areas near Half Dome in Yosemite National Park, California. Park officials believe it was started near Starr King Lake, during a lightning storm, on July 19, 2014. On Sunday, September 7, 2014 the fire forced authorities to order the evacuation by helicopter of dozens of hikers and tourists. On September 16, 2014 the fire burned 4,971 acres (2,012 ha) and was 80% contained. On September 18, the containment of the Meadow Fire increased to 85%, without having expanded further. During the next 4 days, firefighters were able to make significant progress on extinguishing the fire, especially with the 0.25 inches of rainfall during the weekend, and by September 22, the containment of the Meadow Fire had increased to 98%. From September 25 to 26, the containment of the wildfire still remained at 98%, despite some snow and rain falling in the region. On September 27, an additional inch of precipitation helped quench the wildfire, and on September 29, the Meadow Fire was 100% contained. No injuries or fatalities were reported.

The damage caused by the Meadow Fire was severe. The high-intensity wildfire burned very hot and, in some areas, the large fir and lodgepole pines were reduced to charcoal stalagmites. The forest floor was slow to recover because of the lack of moisture during the California drought. During the summer of 2015, greenery was scarce and the forest floor was still covered in a thick layer of ash. However, scientists predicted that the coniferous forest would regenerate after a few years despite the drought.

The Little Yosemite Valley backpacker's campsite is not within the Meadow Fire's burn scar.
