= 2014 California wildfires =

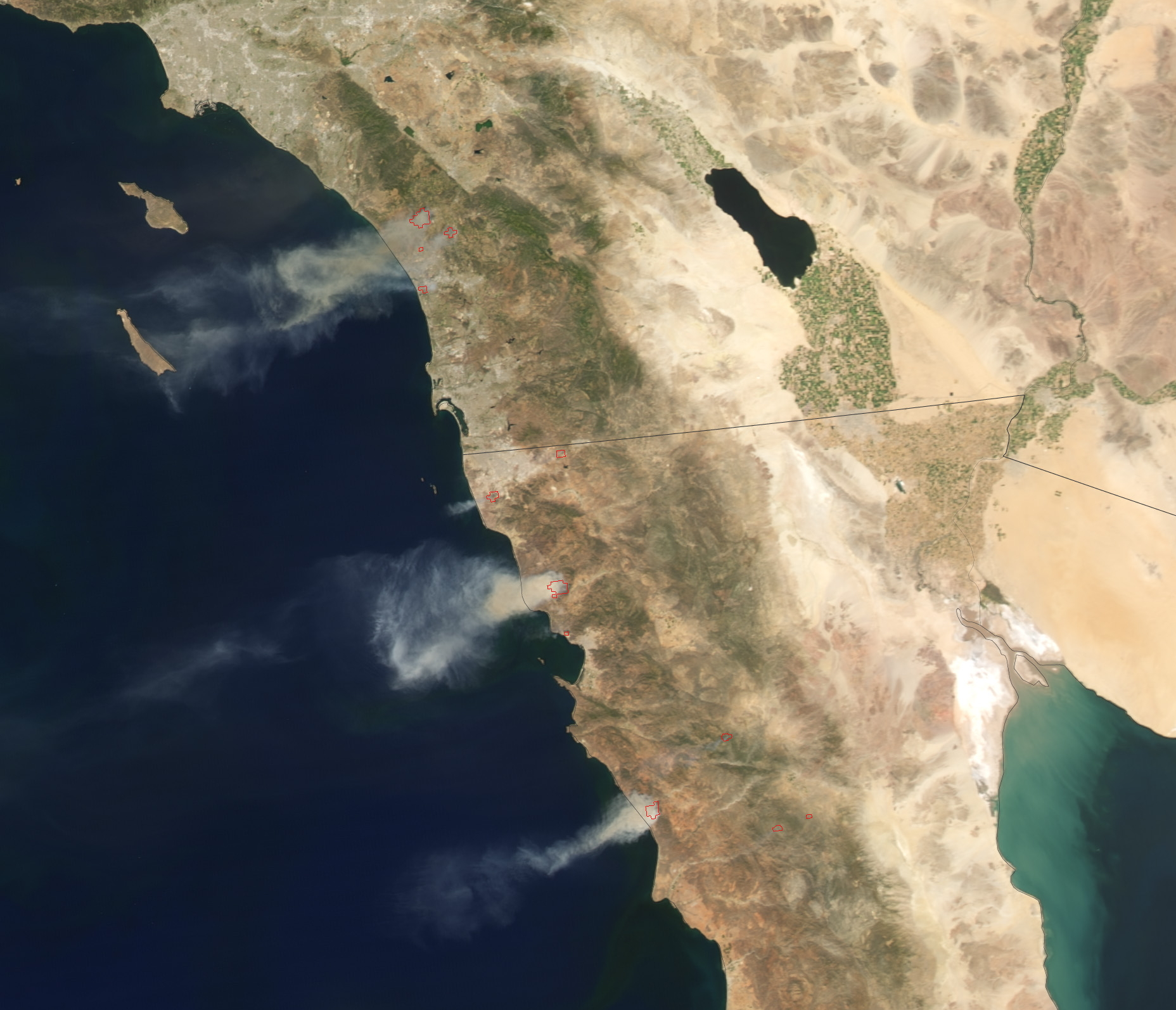
- Satellite image of the wildfires in Southern California and Baja California, on May 15, 2014.

Statistics
- Total fires: 7,865
- Total area: 625,540 acres (2,531 km^{2})

Impacts
- Deaths: 4 confirmed
- Injuries: At least 146
- Structures lost: 650
- Cost: At least $204.05 million (2014 USD)

Map
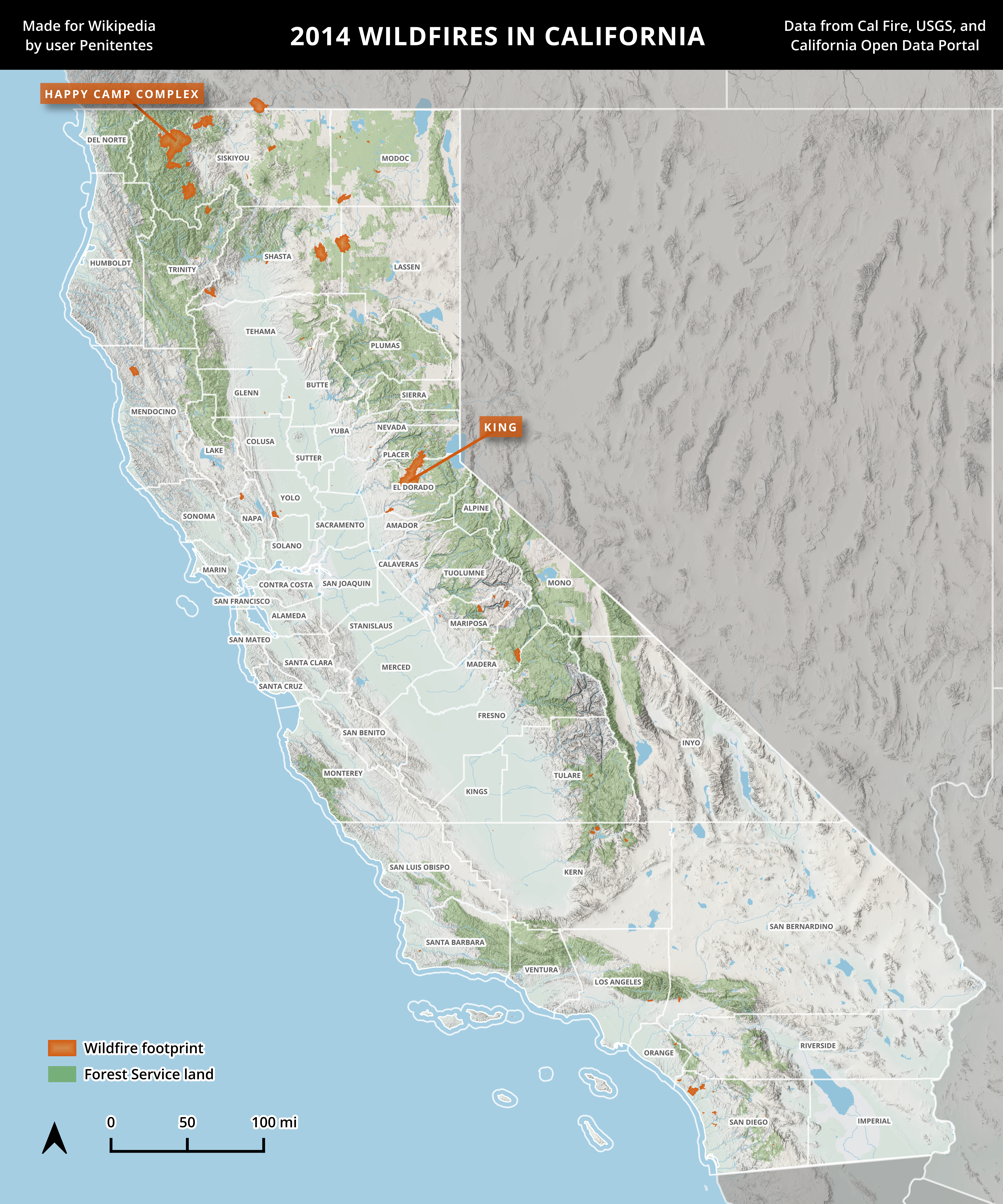
- A map of wildfires in California in 2014, using Cal Fire data

2014 saw several notable wildfires igniting in California, especially during the month of May, when multiple fires were ablaze concurrently in Southern California, and during September, when several massive wildfires were burning in Northern California. In the context of the 2012–13 North American drought (especially the 2011–17 California drought), as well as powerful Santa Ana winds, weather conditions were ideal for wildfires. A total of 7,865 wildfires ignited throughout the year, which burned at least 625,540 acres (2,531.5 km^{2}) of land. The wildfires caused a total of 146 injuries and 2 fatalities, in addition to causing at least $204.05 million (2014 USD) in damage.

The season began unusually early when a wildfire ignited on January 1, followed by 6 more fires igniting later within the same month. During a heat wave and dry Santa Ana conditions in May 2014, multiple wildfires broke out simultaneously in San Diego County, along with several other wildfires elsewhere in California. By mid-May, fire officials said they had already dealt with 1,400 wildfires in California in 2014 - twice the normal amount for that time of year - and a spokesman for CAL FIRE described the conditions as "unprecedented." The May 2014 San Diego County wildfires were estimated to have caused at least $60 million (2014 USD) in damage. In late June to early August, another group of wildfires ignited across the state, some of which reached over twenty thousand acres in size. In mid-September, the largest group of wildfires erupted, with some wildfires becoming larger than 50,000 acres in size. In early September 2014, the Happy Complex Fire became the largest wildfire of the season, eventually topping out at 135,369 acres (54,782 ha) in size on September 27. On October 8, an aerial tanker crashed during a firefighting effort at the Dog Rock Fire, which killed the pilot and sparked a small wildfire. From late September to late October, the latest flare-up of major wildfires were extinguished by cooler weather and precipitation.

From December 10–13, a powerful winter storm extinguished the remaining wildfires that were present. In mid-December through late December, several more small wildfires sparked, but they were all extinguished by December 31.

In 2014, a study examined the human role in growing California wildfire risks. The paper is titled "Extreme fire season in California: A glimpse into the future?" It was published as the second chapter of "Explaining Extreme Events of 2014", by the American Meteorological Society. The authors also projected into the future, and the predicted results showed increases in the drought index, the area under extreme threat of fires, and the days of fire danger, stating that, "The increase in extreme fire risk is expected within the coming decade to exceed that of natural variability and this serves as an indication that anthropogenic climate warming will likely play a significant role in influence California’s fire season."

== Background ==
The timing of "fire season" in California is variable, depending on the amount of prior winter and spring precipitation, the frequency and severity of weather such as heat waves and wind events, and moisture content in vegetation. Northern California typically sees wildfire activity between late spring and early fall, peaking in the summer with hotter and drier conditions. Occasional cold frontal passages can bring wind and lightning. The timing of fire season in Southern California is similar, peaking between late spring and fall. The severity and duration of peak activity in either part of the state is modulated in part by weather events: downslope/offshore wind events can lead to critical fire weather, while onshore flow and Pacific weather systems can bring conditions that hamper wildfire growth.

== List of wildfires ==
Below is a list of all fires that exceeded 1,000 acres (400 ha) during the 2014 California wildfire season, as well as the fires that caused significant damage. The list is taken from CAL FIRE's list of large fires.

Name	County	Acres	Km^{2}	Start date	Containment Date (Note: Containment means that fire crews have established and secured control lines around the fire's perimeter. These lines are artificial barriers, like trenches or cleared vegetation, designed to stop the fire's spread, or natural barriers like rivers. Containment reflects progress in managing the fire but does not necessarily mean the fire is starved of fuel, under control, or put out.)	Notes	Ref
Soda	Tulare	1,612	6.5	January 14, 2014	February 15, 2014		
Colby	Los Angeles	1,952	7.9	January 16, 2014	January 21, 2014	15 structures destroyed	
Etiwanda	San Bernardino	2,200	8.9	April 30, 2014	May 9, 2014		
Bernardo	San Diego	1,548	6.3	May 13, 2014	May 17, 2014		
Tomahawk	San Diego	5,367	21.7	May 14, 2014	May 19, 2014		
Poinsettia	San Diego	600	2.4	May 14, 2014	May 17, 2014	28 structures destroyed	
Cocos	San Diego	1,995	8.1	May 14, 2014	May 22, 2014	40 structures destroyed	
Pulgas	San Diego	14,416	58.3	May 15, 2014	May 21, 2014		
San Mateo	San Diego	1,457	5.9	May 16, 2014	May 20, 2014		
Shirley	Kern	2,545	10.3	June 13, 2014	June 22, 2014	2 structures destroyed	
Stony	Monterey	4,840	19.6	June 19, 2014	June 22, 2014		
Butts	Napa	4,300	17.4	July 1, 2014	July 9, 2014	9 structures destroyed, 2 civilian fatalities	
Modoc July Complex	Modoc	2,566	10.4	July 1, 2014	July 7, 2014		
Monticello	Yolo	6,488	26.3	July 4, 2014	July 12, 2014		
Bully	Shasta	12,661	51.2	July 11, 2014	July 28, 2014	20 structures destroyed 1 civilian fatality	
Nicolls	Kern	1,680	6.8	July 11, 2014	July 19, 2014		
Dark Hole	Mariposa	1,077	4.4	July 16, 2014	August 20, 2014		
Sand	El Dorado	4,240	17.2	July 25, 2014	September 2, 2014	67 structures destroyed	
Kelley	Merced	1,000	4.0	July 26, 2014	July 29, 2014		
El Portal	Mariposa	4,689	19.0	July 26, 2014	August 4, 2014	2 structures destroyed	
French	Madera	13,838	56.0	July 28, 2014	August 18, 2014		
Day	Modoc	13,153	53.2	July 30, 2014	August 13, 2014	10 structures destroyed	
Lodge Complex	Mendocino	12,535	50.7	July 30, 2014	August 9, 2014		
Bald	Shasta	39,736	160.8	July 30, 2014	August 16, 2014		
Coffee Complex	Trinity	6,178	25.0	July 30, 2014	August 16, 2014		
Beaver	Siskiyou	32,496	131.5	July 30, 2014	August 30, 2014	6 structures destroyed	
Little Deer	Siskiyou	5,503	22.3	July 31, 2014	August 11, 2014	1 structure destroyed	
Eiler	Shasta	32,416	131.2	July 31, 2014	August 24, 2014	21 structures destroyed	
July Complex	Siskiyou	50,042	202.5	August 3, 2014	September 25, 2014	2 structures destroyed	
Happy Camp Complex	Siskiyou	134,056	542.5	August 14, 2014	October 31, 2014	6 structures destroyed	
Meadow	Mariposa	4,772	19.3	August 15, 2014	September 29, 2014		
Way	Kern	4,045	16.4	August 18, 2014	August 28, 2014	12 structures destroyed	
Gulch	Shasta	1,375	5.6	September 10, 2014	September 16, 2014	4 structures destroyed	
King	El Dorado	97,717	395.4	September 13, 2014	October 9, 2014	80 structures destroyed	
Courtney	Madera	320	1.3	September 14, 2014	September 21, 2014	49 structures destroyed	
Boles	Siskiyou	516	2.1	September 15, 2014	October 11, 2014	157 structures destroyed	
Dog Rock	Mariposa	311	1.3	October 7, 2014	October 12, 2014	1 firefighter killed	

== May San Diego County wildfires ==
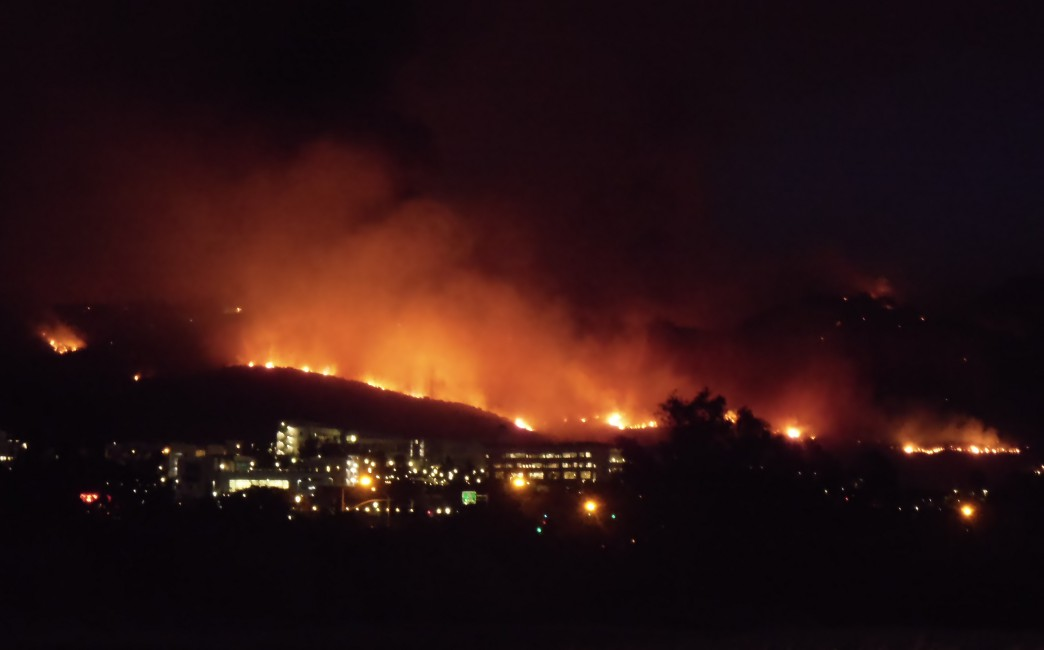
The Cocos Fire burning above CSU San Marcos, on May 14, 2014

In May 2014, a series of at least 20 wildfires broke out in San Diego County during severe Santa Ana Wind conditions, historic drought conditions, and a heat wave. The main event during mid-May was preceded by a precursor fire that ignited on May 5. The severe weather conditions contributed to the spread of at least 19 more individual wildfires, with ten of them receiving names. The Cocos Fire, which was the most destructive with 40 structured being destroyed, was determined to have been caused by arson. The causes of the other fires are still under investigation by multiple agencies, and a joint task force was formed to coordinate the investigations and facilitate communications. Six injuries and one fire-related fatality were reported.

== Miguelito Fire ==
At 2:00 PM PDT on May 13, the Miguelito Fire broke out off Santa Miguelito Canyon Road in Lompoc, Santa Barbara County. Over the course of the next week and a half, the fire gradually expanded northward to 632 acres (256 ha) towards the direction of Lompoc, before firefighters managed to stop its expansion on May 16. The fire threatened 1,200 buildings in Lompoc, prompting evacuation orders for the affected areas. On May 16, evacuation orders were lifted, after the fire was reported to be 95% contained. At 9:20 AM PDT on May 19, the Miguelito Fire was reported to be 100% contained. No structural damage or injuries were reported.

== Hunters Fire ==
On May 27, at 3:00 PM PDT, the Hunters Fire broke out at Hunters Valley Access Road Bear Valley Area, in Mariposa County. The fire spread toward populated areas and evacuations were ordered for the Hunters Valley Area.

== Stony Fire ==
On June 19, at 3:14 PM PDT, the Stony Fire was reported at Stony Valley Range on Fort Hunter Liggett, in Monterey County. The wildfire quickly spread to 5,000 acres (2,000 ha), but it was 100% contained by June 20. Moderate amounts of smoke still lingered within the area, and cleanup work was expected to continue for the next few days. The Nacimiento-Ferguson Road was also closed due to downed trees, but was expected to reopen a couple of days later. No evacuations were ordered for this fire, and no injuries or fatalities were reported. The cause of the wildfire is currently under investigation.

== Butts Fire ==
On July 1, at 12:08 PM PDT, the Butts Fire broke out near Butts Canyon Road in Pope Valley, California, northwest of Lake Berryessa, in Yolo County.

== Banner Fire ==
The Banner Fire erupted around 10:30 AM PDT on July 3, 2014 in the Banner, California area, near Route 78 in San Diego County. It quickly spread westward and expanded to 150 acres (61 ha), threatening the town of Julian. Portions of Route 78 were closed, and mandatory evacuation was ordered for 200 homes; however, the evacuation order was lifted later that evening, as the containment of the wildfire's perimeter increased. Two homes were destroyed, but the heavy use of firefighting planes and helicopters prevented additional losses.

== Monticello Fire ==
The fire was reported around 9:30 p.m. on Friday, July 4, and quickly grew in size, due to dry and erratic windy conditions. By 11 PM that night, the fire was 100 acres in size, and by 4 AM the next morning, it was already 1,000 acres, according to Winters City Manager John Donlevy, who added that, "...the hills are literally tinder-dry." Highway 128 west of Winters was shut down due to the fire while thirty-four structures at Golden Bear Estates were immediately threatened, resulting in the mandatory evacuation of residents in that area. A separate voluntary evacuation order for the Canyon Creek Resort campground was also put into effect but lifted later that day. As the fire burned north into rugged, steep terrain, access to the area became difficult, limiting firefighting operations. An American Red Cross Shelter was immediately set up at Winters Community Center at 4 a.m. that Saturday morning for over 40 evacuees.

By Saturday afternoon, on July 5, the fire had reportedly tripped in size to over 5,000 acres (2,000 ha), while containment hovered at a mere 15 percent.

On Sunday, July 6, containment of the Monticello fire grew to 30 percent, while at least 1,275 firefighters were reported battling the blaze. Fire conditions remained volatile as wind directors switched several times throughout the day, reached gusts of up to 20 mph.

All evacuation orders were lifted on Monday, July 7, as containment of the fire grew to 45 percent, with over 1,750 fire personnel on hand. Within the following days, containment lines grew and by July 11, the incident was 95 percent contained with investigators still trying to determine the cause of the fire. The fire was finally contained on July 12, after destroying 6,488 acres (26.26 km^{2}), however no structures were damaged. The cause of the fire was later determined to be firework-related.

== Sand Fire ==
The Sand Fire was ignited in El Dorado County, five miles north of the Amador County town of Plymouth, on July 25, at 4:34 PM PDT, by a vehicle driving over dry vegetation. A total of 4,240 acres (1,720 ha) were burned, claiming 20 residences and 47 outbuildings. Twelve hundred residences were evacuated before full containment of the wildfire was achieved on August 2.

== Gulch Fire ==
On September 10, a car fire started a fire in the Bella Vista area. On September 16, the Gulch Fire was fully contained after burning 1,375 acres (556 ha). The wildfire has also injured a total of 4 people. The damage caused by the Gulch Fire is currently unknown.

== See also ==
- May 2014 San Diego County wildfires
- 2016 California wildfires
- List of California wildfires
- Climate change in California
- 2014–15 North American winter
