= Bully Fire =

2014 wildfire in Northern California

- Part of the 2014 California wildfires
- Date: July 11, 2014 –; July 26, 2014
- Location: Shasta County, California
- Coordinates: 40.4314°N 122.750788°W

Statistics
- Burned area: 12,661 acres (51 km^{2})

Impacts
- Deaths: 1
- Injuries: 21
- Structures lost: 20

Map
- Location of fire in Northern California

The Bully Fire was a wildfire in Shasta County.

It started on July 11, 2014 at 3:37 PM PDT. The fire quickly spread to 700 acres (2.8 km^{2}), and it was only 5% contained. During the next day, dry weather coupled with a heat wave allowed to fire to advance to 1,800 acres (7.3 km^{2}), prompting mandatory evacuations to be issued for the region, as well as several miles of road closures. During the next few days, the wildfire exploded to 8,700 acres (35 km^{2}), prompting additional evacuations, since the wildfire was only 25% contained. A couple of days later, the Bully Fire reached 11,700 acres (47 km^{2}), but the containment also increased to 45%. By July 18, the wildfire had expanded further to 12,661 acres (5,124 ha), with the containment only at 65%. During the next few days, containment gradually increased to 95%, before progress stalled on July 22.

However, the increase in containment allowed the road closures and the evacuation orders to be lifted. During the next 4 days, firefighting efforts continued slowly to extinguish the Bully Fire, until full containment of the perimeter was achieved on July 26, at 8:00 PM PDT. Fire patrols lingered for the next couple of days to work on extinguishing the blaze, and on July 28, the Bully Fire was reported to be 100% controlled.

During its duration, the Bully Fire destroyed a total of 20 residential structures. A total of 21 injuries and 1 death were also reportedly caused by the fire, which was determined to be human-caused.

In 2014, Freddie Alexander Smoke III was arrested by police in Indiana and extradited to Shasta County. He pleaded no contest to charges of arson and involuntary manslaughter, and was sentenced to five years in prison and restitution.
