= Butts Fire =

2014 wildfire in Northern California

- Part of the 2014 California wildfires
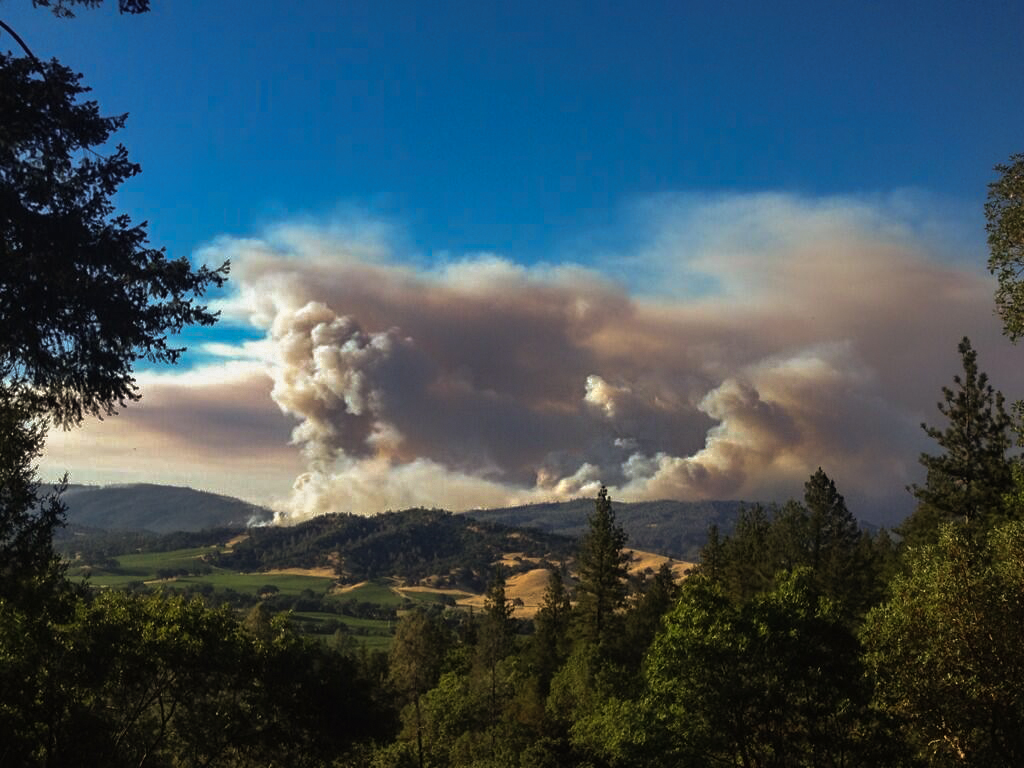
- Date: July 1, 2014 –; July 10, 2014
- Location: Pope Valley, Napa County, California, United States
- Coordinates: 38.681382°N 122.446105°W

Statistics
- Burned area: 4,300 acres (17 km^{2})

Impacts
- Deaths: 2
- Injuries: 4, including 2 firefighters
- Structures lost: 9

Ignition
- Cause: Under Investigation

Map
- Location within California

Location of Butts Fire

The Butts Fire was a wildfire in Napa County north of Pope Valley, and 10 miles west of Lake Berryessa, California in the United States. The fire was reported on July 1, 2014 and was contained on July 10, after burning an estimated 4,300 acres (17 km^{2}). The fire, dubbed after Butts Canyon in the Pope Valley area, threatened more than 300 homes at its peak, and lead to the closure of Butts Canyon Road. The cause of the Butts fire remains under investigation. The fire also subsequently destroyed 2 homes, 7 outbuildings and killed 2 civilians. At the fires peak, 1,682 fire personnel, 101 fire engines, 60 fire crews, 10 bulldozers, nine helicopters, and four air tankers were battling the inferno.

== Events ==
The fire broke out at around 12:40 pm on Tuesday, July 1, near Butts Canyon and Oak Valley road and within an hour had crossed both ends of the valley along the road. Over 1,000 firefighters had been deployed to the fire by late Tuesday evening, as it had ballooned from an estimated 500 acres to over 2,700 acres. The fire continued to burn in a predominantly northern direction as Butts Canyon Road was closed to the public.

On Wednesday, July 2, Governor Jerry Brown announced that he has secured federal funds from a FEMA grant to help fire departments cover the cost of battling the blaze, which had by that point destroyed seven structures and was 30% contained. Later that day, the Butts fire had grown to 3,800 acres as containment was still stagnant at 30% while over 380 structures were under mandatory threat. CAL FIRE made note that the Butts fire had been the most significant wildfire to burn in the state in weeks during that summer.

By early Thursday, July 3, the fire had continued to spread in largely rural parts of both Napa and Lake County, leading to further evacuations that had now included portions of the Lake county area. After significant burn-off operations Thursday and later Friday, July 4, containment lines on the Butts fire grew to 65% as the forward progress of the fire was halted at 4,300 acres. By this time, seven outbuildings and two single family homes had been destroyed. On July 10, the fire had remained the same acreage as it was fully contained by firefighters.

== Fatalities ==
The skeletal remains of two bodies were discovered by concrete workers driving along Butt Canyon Road in the spring of March 2016. It would take several months before the bodies would be identified as that of Santa Rosa brothers Mario and Florentino Avendano who had been reported missing in the area. The brothers were first reported missing in January 2015, more than seven months following the events of the Butts fire. It is believed the two died while attempting to flee during the early hours of the fire and became entrapped.

== See also ==
- 2014 California wildfires
