= Tomahawk Fire =

2014 wildfire in Southern California

- Part of the May 2014 San Diego County wildfires
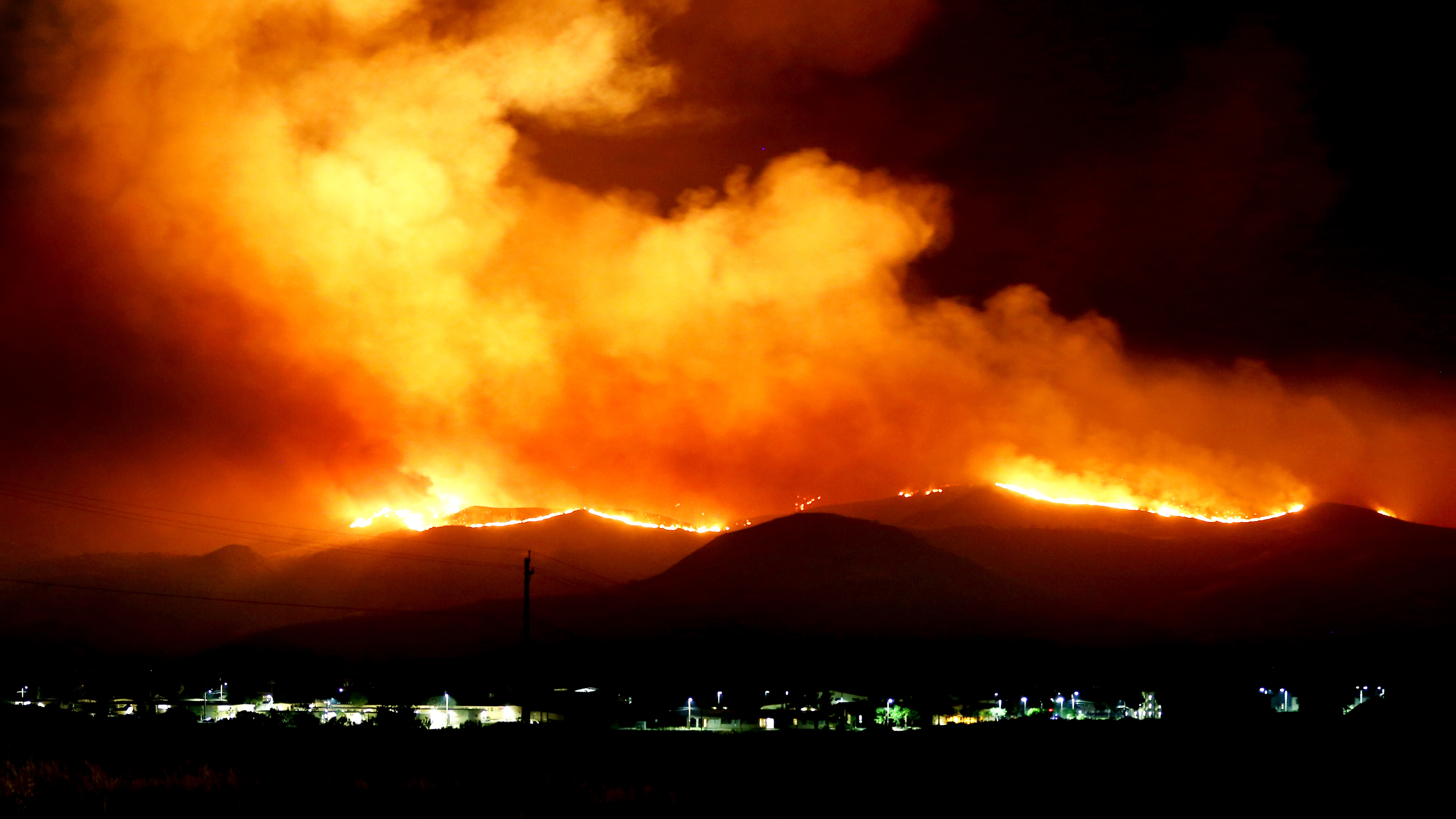
- The Tomahawk Fire, on the night of May 15, 2014
- Date: May 14, 2014 –; May 19, 2014
- Location: Camp Pendleton, San Diego County, California
- Coordinates: 33.3529°N 117.284889°W

Statistics
- Burned area: 5,367 acres (22 km^{2})

Impacts
- Deaths: None reported
- Injuries: None reported
- Cost: Unknown

Map
- Location within southern California

The Tomahawk Fire was the second-largest wildfire of the May 2014 San Diego County wildfires, behind the Pulgas Fire. The fire, which started on May 14 around 9:45 AM, on the Naval Weapons Station Seal Beach Detachment Fallbrook (also known as Fallbrook Naval Weapons Station), scorched 5,367 acres (21.72 km^{2}). The Fallbrook Naval Weapons Station is on the eastern side of, and provides an entry point to, Marine Corps Base Camp Pendleton and is adjacent to the community of Fallbrook. Evacuation orders were issued for several schools and housing areas, as well as the Fallbrook Naval Weapons Station and the closed San Onofre Nuclear Generating Station. By 8 PM PDT on May 14, the Tomahawk Fire had reached a size of 6,000 acres (2,400 ha). On May 16, the fire had burned 6,300 acres (2,500 ha), and it was 23% contained. By May 17, it had burned 6,500 acres (2,600 ha) and was 65% contained. During the evening of May 18, the fire was reported to be 100% contained.

== See also ==
- October 2007 California wildfires
- 2014 California wildfires
- December 2017 Southern California wildfires
