= Shirley Fire =

2014 wildfire in California

- Part of the 2014 California wildfires
- Date: June 13, 2014 –; June 26, 2014
- Location: Shirley Meadows, Kern County
- Coordinates: 35.717°N 118.555°W

Statistics
- Burned area: 2,545 acres (1,030 ha)

Impacts
- Cost: $12.1 million

Ignition
- Cause: Undetermined

The Shirley Fire was a wildfire that started on June 13, 2014 at 5:00 PM PDT, 3 miles (4.8 km) south of Shirley Meadows, Kern County, California, in the southern part of the Sequoia National Forest. The fire rapidly spread, due to dry weather and drought conditions.

By June 15, the Shirley Fire had expanded to 1,800 acres (730 ha), and it was reported as being only 10% contained. As a result, parts of the National Forest were closed, and evacuations were ordered for residences in the area. On June 16, the Shirley Fire expanded eastward towards Lake Isabella to 2,200 acres (890 ha), and began to threaten more homes. The cause of the wildfire was not determined. During the afternoon of June 16, the wildfire was reported to have expanded to 2,646 acres (1,071 ha), but the wildfire was also 50% contained. On June 17, the spread of the fire had stopped, and it was reported to be 75% contained. During the late afternoon of June 17, it was reported that the Shirley Fire was 85% contained. On June 18, the fire was 90% contained.

Soon afterwards, many of the firefighters were withdrawn in order to prepare for possible future wildfire outbreaks, due to an approaching heat wave in which temperatures were expected to be in the hundreds. During the same day, the administration of Sequoia National Forest stated that the Shirley Fire was expected to continue burning within the containment line for the next several days, due to continuing drought conditions, an approaching heat wave, and the amount of timber the fire could consume as fuel within its perimeter. On June 20, it was reported that the perimeter of the Shirley Fire was 100% contained, but the wildfire continued to burn well inside of its perimeter while producing moderate amounts of smoke, which was expected to continue for the next several days.

The firefighting efforts and the damage caused by the wildfire cost a total of $12,155,450 (2014 USD). On June 21, the USDA Forest Service and the DOI Bureau of Land Management worked together to initiate cleanup efforts, assess the damage caused by the Shirley Fire, and assist in recovery efforts. The two agencies also worked to help bring the Shirley Fire under control, as well as to help the wildlife recover, and to prevent further degradation of resources. At 6:00 PM PDT on June 26, the roadblocks issued for the Shirley Fire were lifted, even though the wildfire continued to burn within the containment line. On July 15, the Shirley Fire was 100% controlled.
