= May 2014 San Diego County wildfires =

Series of drought-induced conflagrations in California, United States

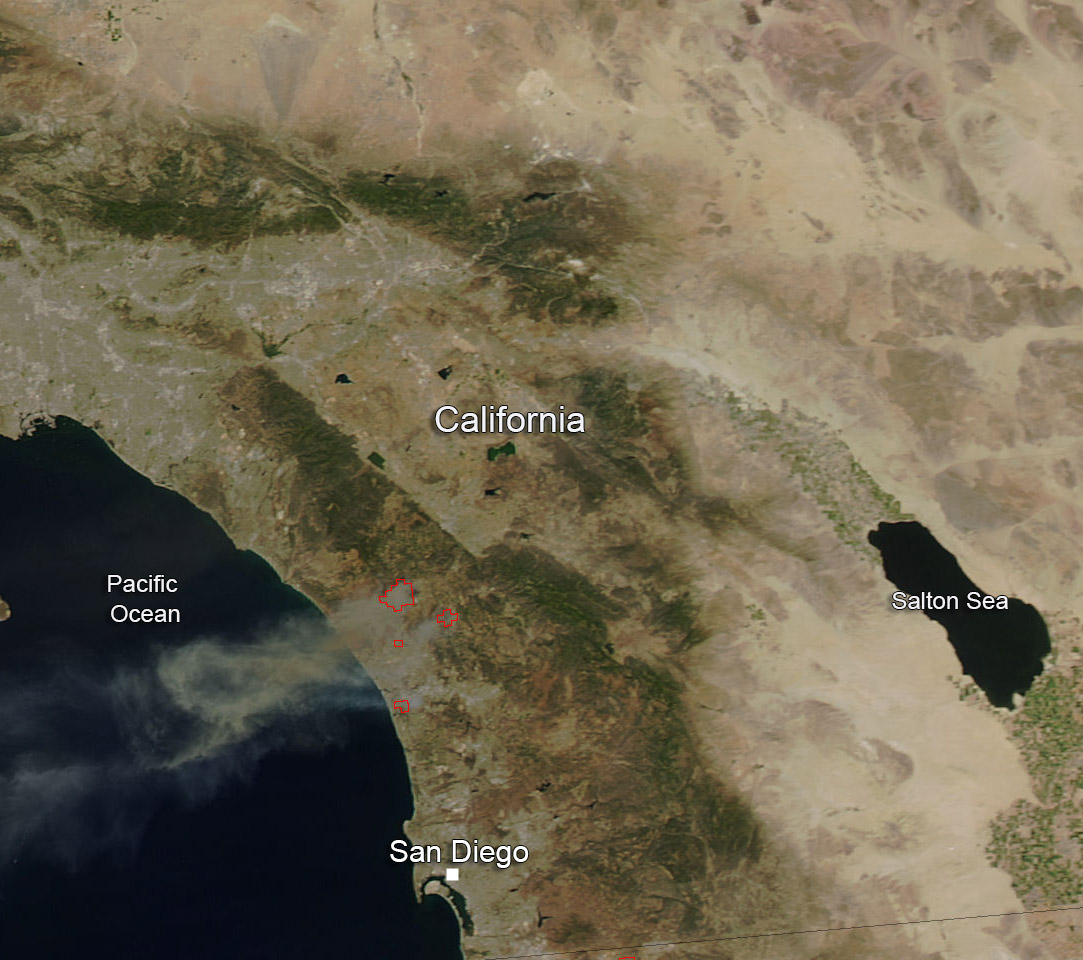
- Satellite image of several of the wildfires in San Diego County on May 14, 2014.
- Date: May 5, 2014 – May 22, 2014
- Location: San Diego County, California

Statistics
- Total fires: 20
- Burned area: At least 26,001 acres (10,522 ha)

Impacts
- Deaths: 1 confirmed
- Injuries: At least 6
- Cost: $60 million (2014 USD) total

Ignition
- Cause: Arson, faulty construction equipment, etc.

The May 2014 San Diego County wildfires were a swarm of 20 wildfires that erupted during May 2014, in San Diego County, California, during severe Santa Ana Wind conditions, historic drought conditions, and a heat wave. The main event during mid-May was preceded by a precursor fire that ignited on May 5. The Bernardo Fire has been declared accidental, and officials believe the Cocos Fire was intentionally set. The causes of the other fires are still under investigation by multiple agencies, and a joint task force was formed to coordinate the investigations and facilitate communications. Six injuries and one fire-related fatality were reported.

At least eight major (named) fires were burning simultaneously at the height of the event, as well as several unnamed small brush fires. Smoke from the fires also prompted health advisories in parts of Orange and Los Angeles counties.

On May 14, the County of San Diego declared a local emergency. Later that evening, Governor Jerry Brown declared a state of emergency for the county and affected areas.

Multiple school districts, California State University, San Marcos, MiraCosta College, and Palomar College were forced to cancel classes and close schools for one or more days; CSUSM and Palomar also postponed or cancelled commencement exercises due to the fires. All evacuation orders were lifted by May 18, and all schools resumed classes on May 19.

The Cocos Fire was the last of the May 2014 wildfires to be extinguished, with full containment on May 22. By the time the last of the fires was extinguished, approximately 26,001 acres (105 km^{2}) of land had burned and an estimated 65 structures had been destroyed. Damage estimates were still being compiled as of late May 2014, but the County estimated that the fires cost close to $60 million (2014 USD), including $29.8 million in destruction or damage to private property, and $27.9 million in the costs of firefighting, support, and environmental damage.

== Weather ==
The May outbreak of fires occurred during a period of offshore flow throughout Southern California that meteorologist deemed highly unusual for the month of May. Beginning on May 11, the situation turned critical and red flag warnings went were issued across the region. By May 14, with the warnings still in effect, daytime temperatures were hovering around 100 °F (38 °C), with humidity below 10%.

On May 17, the Santa Ana Winds subsided and temperatures started to drop. On May 18, weather conditions had returned to seasonal norms, with lower temperatures around 80 °F (27 °C) and higher humidity.

== Wildfires ==
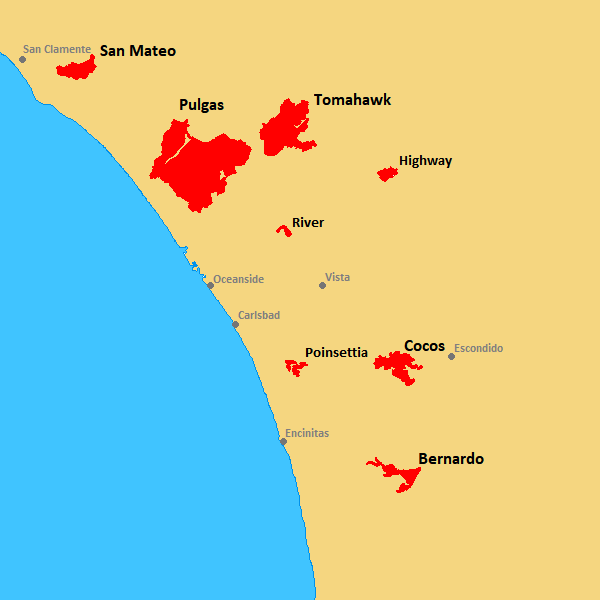
Map of the major wildfires in San Diego County

Name	Acres	Km^{2}	Start date	Containment Date	Notes	Ref
Jacumba	29	0.1	May 5, 2014	May 6, 2014		
Bernardo	1,548	6.3	May 13, 2014	May 17, 2014		
Tomahawk	5,367	21.7	May 14, 2014	May 19, 2014		
Poinsettia	600	2.4	May 14, 2014	May 17, 2014	28 structures destroyed	
Highway	380	1.5	May 14, 2014	May 15, 2014		
River	105	0.4	May 14, 2014	May 19, 2014		
Cocos	1,995	8.1	May 14, 2014	May 22, 2014	40 structures destroyed	
Freeway	56	0.2	May 14, 2014	May 20, 2014		
Aurora	17	0.1	May 14, 2014	May 14, 2014		
Pulgas	14,416	58.3	May 15, 2014	May 21, 2014		
San Mateo	1,457	5.9	May 16, 2014	May 20, 2014		
Sycamore	30	0.1	May 17, 2014	May 17, 2014		

=== Jacumba Fire ===
The Jacumba Fire was a precursor wildfire, which the preceded the main outbreak of wildfires that occurred a week later. At 4:36 PM PDT on May 5, the Jacumba Fire was reported off Interstate 8, east of McCain Valley Road. The fire expanded to a maximum of 29 acres (12 ha), before it was fully contained at 10:20 AM PDT on May 20.

=== Bernardo Fire ===
The Bernardo Fire in 4S Ranch, near Rancho Bernardo, started on May 13, at 10:00 AM PDT, just south of Del Norte High School, in a construction trench off Nighthawk Lane. The fire burned 1,548 acres (6 km^{2}), before it was ultimately brought under control on May 17. The cause of the fire was ruled to be accidental; authorities said that it started in a small trench being dug by a construction crew, with sparks from a backhoe trencher setting off the fire, which spread rapidly through the dry brush at the site.

Over the next few hours, the wildfire intensified, due to the strong Santa Ana winds driving it southward. This prompted the evacuation of several schools (with the exception of Del Norte High School), in addition to at least 20,000 homes. Within several hours, the fire covered at least 800 acres (320 ha) and was only 5% contained. The rapid southward spread of the fire caused mandatory evacuation orders to be issued for portions of 4S Ranch, Del Sur, Black Mountain Ranch, Rancho Santa Fe, and other residential communities. Late on May 13, the Bernardo Fire reached a size of 1,600 acres (650 ha). By 12:00 AM PDT on May 14, the portion of the fire within 4S Ranch and Del Sur had been completely extinguished, which was about 25% of the Bernardo Fire's 1,600 acre blaze. Later on May 14, all of the evacuation orders were lifted.

On Wednesday, May 14, at 6 PM PDT, the wildfire was 50% contained. By the next morning, it was reported as 75% contained and no longer expanding. On May 16, the Bernardo Fire was reported to be 90% contained, but some structures were still threatened by the fire. On May 17, the fire was 95% contained, without having expanded any further. On May 17, at 8:14 PM PDT, the Bernardo Fire was reported to be 100% contained, without causing any significant property losses.

The San Diego Unified School District closed all its schools citywide on May 15, but reopened most of them on the following day.

=== Tomahawk Fire ===
The Tomahawk Fire was the second-largest wildfire during the outbreak, behind the Pulgas Fire. The fire, which started May 14 around 9:45 AM, on the Naval Weapons Station Seal Beach Detachment Fallbrook (also known as Fallbrook Naval Weapons Station), scorched 5,367 acres (21.72 km^{2}). The Fallbrook Naval Weapons Station is on the eastern side of, and provides an entry point to, Marine Corps Base Camp Pendleton and is adjacent to the community of Fallbrook.

=== Poinsettia Fire ===
The Poinsettia Fire was the second most destructive of the San Diego County wildfires. It caused property damage estimated at $22.5 million, as well as the only reported fatality in the San Diego County series of wildfires. As of July 10, 2014, the cause of the fire is listed as "undetermined", which allows for further investigation if more information comes to light.

=== Highway Fire ===
The Highway Fire near Bonsall and Fallbrook, started at 1 PM on May 14, near Interstate 15 and California State Route 76. Several schools and about 600 residents were evacuated. By 6 PM PDT on May 15, the fire was 100% contained, after reaching a size of 441 acres (178 ha). Authorities reported around $1.1 million in damage and a total area of 441 acres (178 ha).

=== River Fire ===
The River Fire broke out at 1:30 PM on May 14, in Oceanside, starting in the San Luis Rey River riverbed. Homes and an elementary school in the area were evacuated. The Oceanside Unified School District said that all schools would be closed on May 15. On May 16, it was reported that the River Fire was 100% contained, after it had burned 105 acres (42 ha) of land, confined to the river bed. A man was arrested on May 15 and charged with arson, after witnesses saw him adding brush to the flames, but authorities do not believe he actually started the fire.

=== Cocos Fire ===
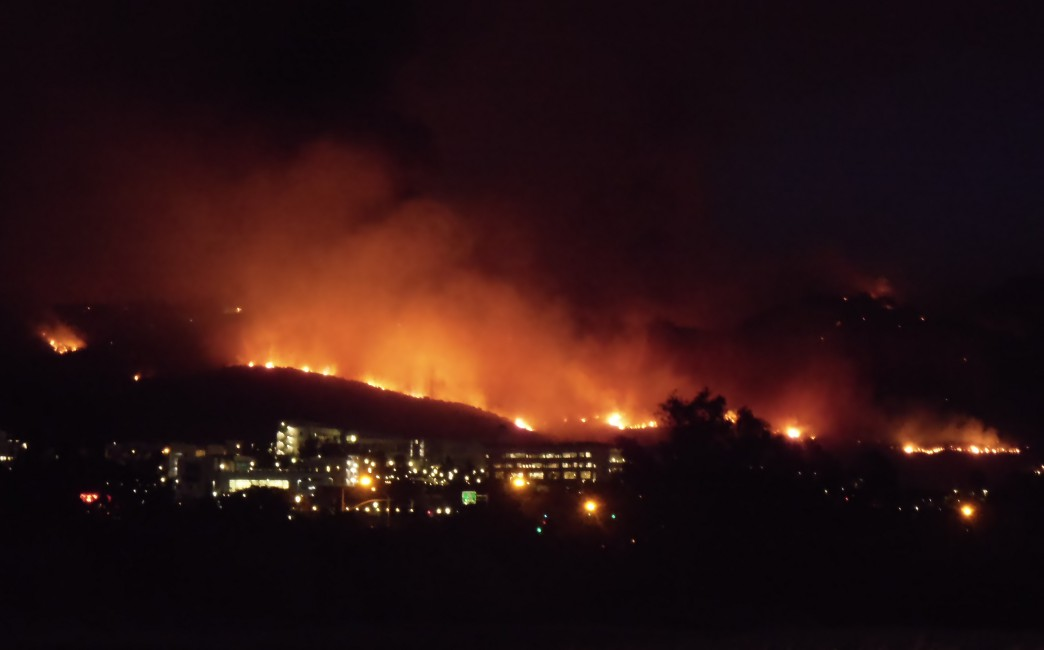
The Cocos Fire burning above CSU San Marcos, on May 14, 2014

The Cocos Fire, previously known as the Twin Oaks Fire, was a wildfire that ignited on May 14 in San Marcos, in the hills south of California State University, San Marcos. The Cocos Fire quickly spread into western Escondido. The fire destroyed more than 40 buildings, including a dozen single-family homes. Property damage from the fire is estimated at more than $5.7 million. Three minor injuries were reported. The Cocos Fire was finally extinguished on May 22, 2014.

=== Freeway Fire ===
Another wildfire, the Freeway Fire also started at the Naval Weapons Station area of Camp Pendleton. It was first reported at 5:43 PM on May 14. On May 16, the fire was 100% contained, after it had burned 56 acres (23 ha).

=== Aurora Fire ===
On May 14, at about 5:20 PM PDT, the Aurora Fire broke out near Interstate 8-Business and Aurora Drive, in Lakeside, prompting evacuation orders for the area around the fire. At around 7:40 PM PDT on the same day, the fire was 100% contained after it had reached a size of 17 acres (6.9 ha), and all evacuation orders in the area were lifted.

=== Pulgas Fire ===
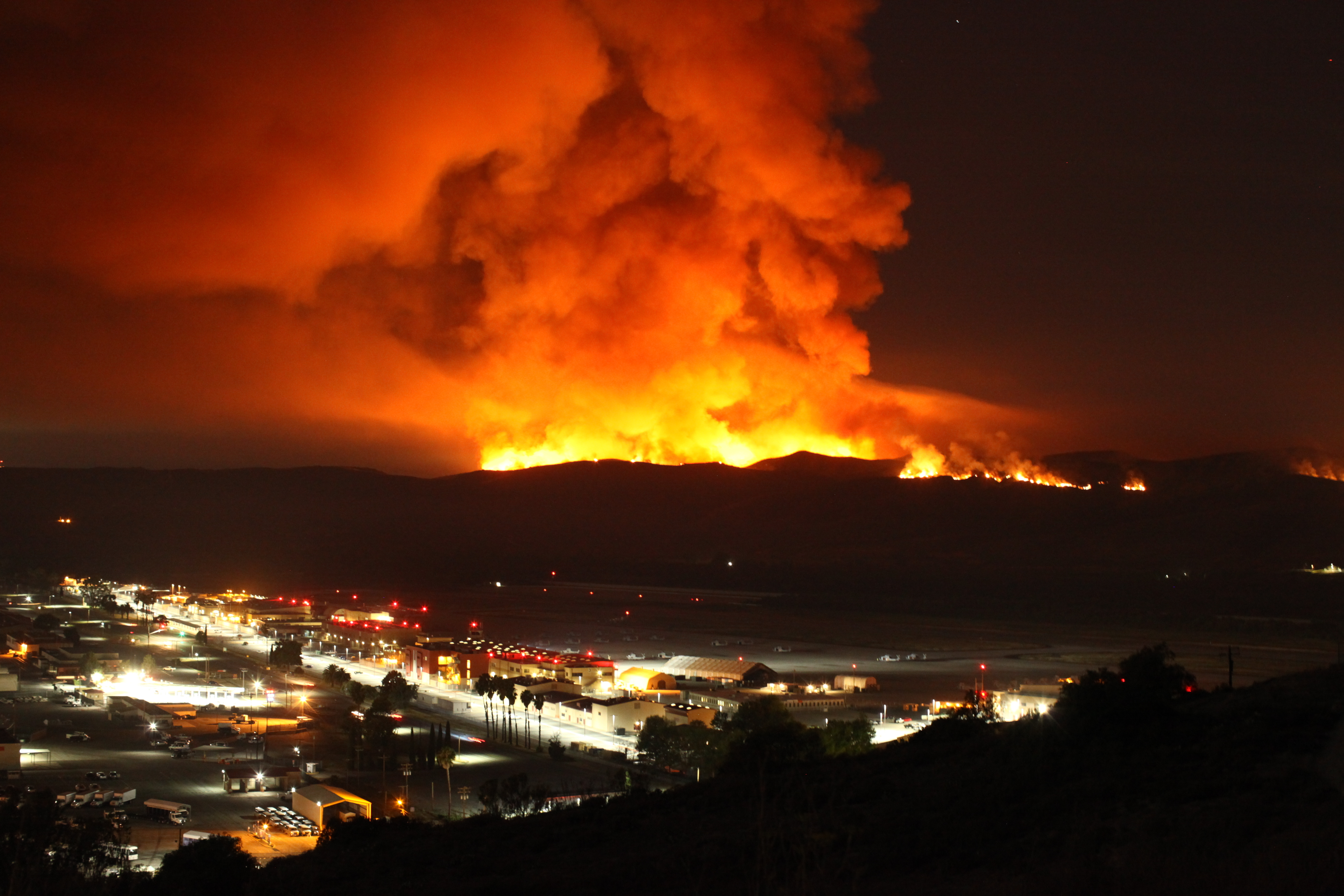
The Pulgas Fire burning above Camp Pendleton at night, on May 16, 2014

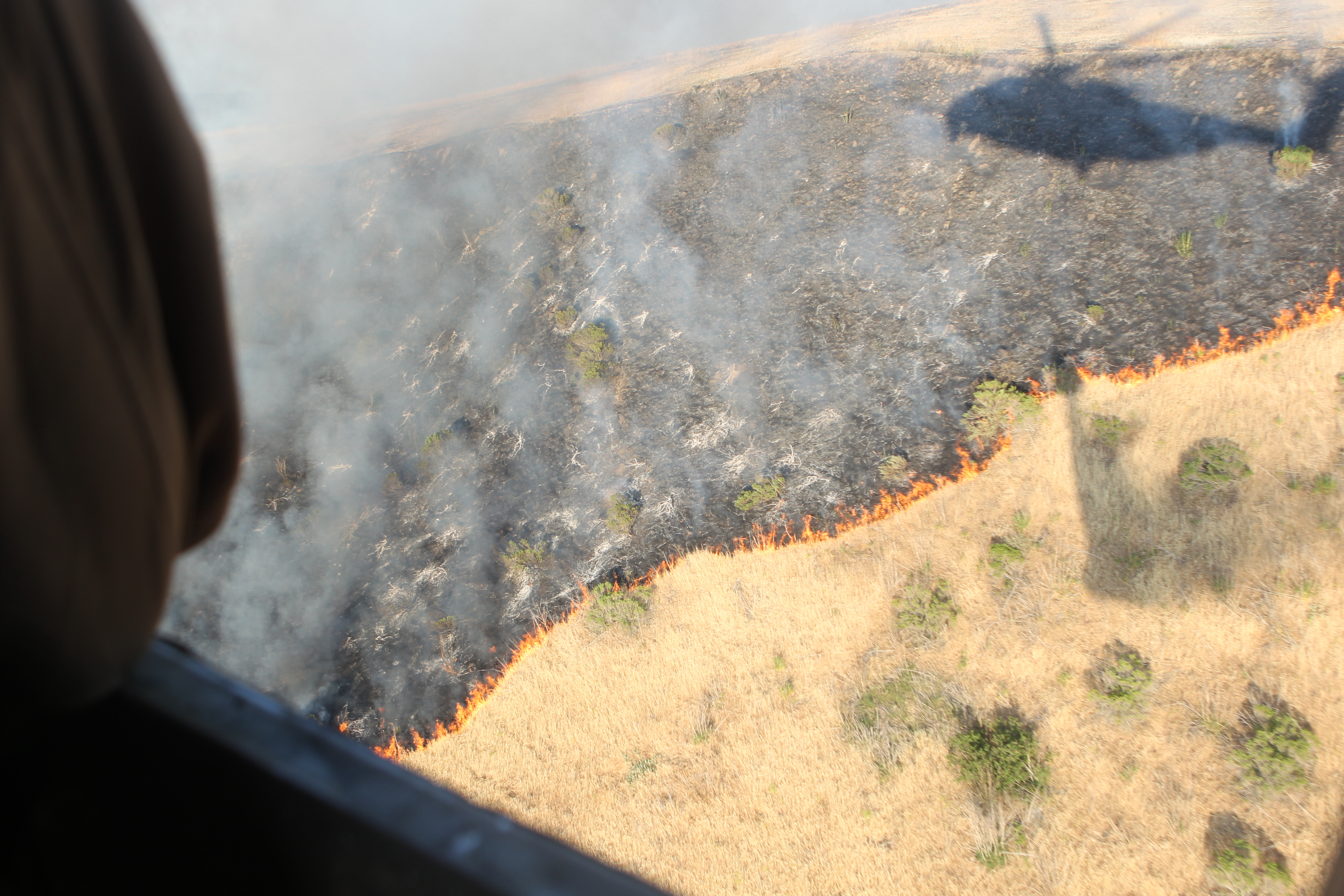
A U.S. Marine Corps CH-53E Super Stallion helicopter from Marine Corps Air Station, Miramar releases water from a bambi bucket during aerial firefighting efforts on the Pulgas fire at Marine Corps Base, Camp Pendleton Calif., May 15, 2014.

At 2:45 PM PDT on May 15, the Pulgas Fire broke out at Camp Pendleton near Interstate 5 at Las Pulgas Road, to the north of Oceanside. The fire quickly burned 500 acres (200 ha) acres within the next couple of hours. It became the largest of the fires in May 2014, scorching a total of 14,416 acres (5,834 ha) of land, before it was fully contained on May 21.

=== San Mateo Fire ===
At around 11:24 PM PDT on May 16, Camp Pendleton reported a third wildfire on base. The fire was initially called the Talega Fire and later the Combat Fire by CAL FIRE, before finally being renamed to the San Mateo Fire. The fire started near the Camp Talega area of the base, near Basilone Road. By the mid-afternoon of May 16, the fire had burned about 25 acres (10 ha) and all non-essential personnel were ordered to be sent home. Evacuation orders were given to personnel in nearby areas of the base including some housing facilities and a school. The San Mateo fire ended up burning a total of 1,457 acres (5.90 km^{2}) of land. Late on May 20, the San Mateo Fire was reported to be 100% contained.

=== Other fires ===
An unnamed small brushfire started in the backyard of a home on Bear Valley Parkway in Escondido, at about 2 PM PDT on May 14. Homes were threatened, and the evacuations some of homes and businesses were ordered in the area of Bear Valley Parkway and Oak Hill. The fire destroyed one outbuilding and several vehicles. Fire crews were able to extinguish the blaze by 2:45 PM, after it had burned a total of 1 acre (0.40 ha) of land.

On May 14, another small brush fire broke out in Escondido on the corner of El Norte Parkway and Nordahl Rd, which was also quickly extinguished.

On May 14, small brush fires also broke out in Lakeside and Scripps Ranch which were extinguished without causing structural damage or injuries.

Later on May 14, another small brush fire broke out in Poway, south of Painted Rock Elementary School, but was quickly extinguished.

On May 15, two teenagers were arrested and charged with arson for attempting to ignite two small brush fires, both of which were extinguished within minutes. Police had no evidence linking them to any of the actual major wildfires, and ultimately, no charges were filed against the suspects.

During the evening of May 15, a brush fire broke out close to Interstate 805 in National City near 45th Street; it was extinguished in about an hour.

At 8:00 AM PDT on May 17, a brush fire was reported in a canyon area northwest of Santee Lakes, called the Sycamore Fire. It burned about 30 acres (12 ha) in an unpopulated area of West Sycamore Canyon, near the eastern edge of MCAS Miramar. Several hours later, the fire was 100% contained.

== See also ==
- December 2017 Southern California wildfires
- 2016 California wildfires
- 2014 California wildfires
- October 2007 California wildfires
- 2005 Labor Day brush fire
- Cedar Fire (2003)
- Climate change in California
- List of California wildfires
