= Cocos Fire =

2014 wildfire in Southern California

- Part of the May 2014 San Diego County wildfires
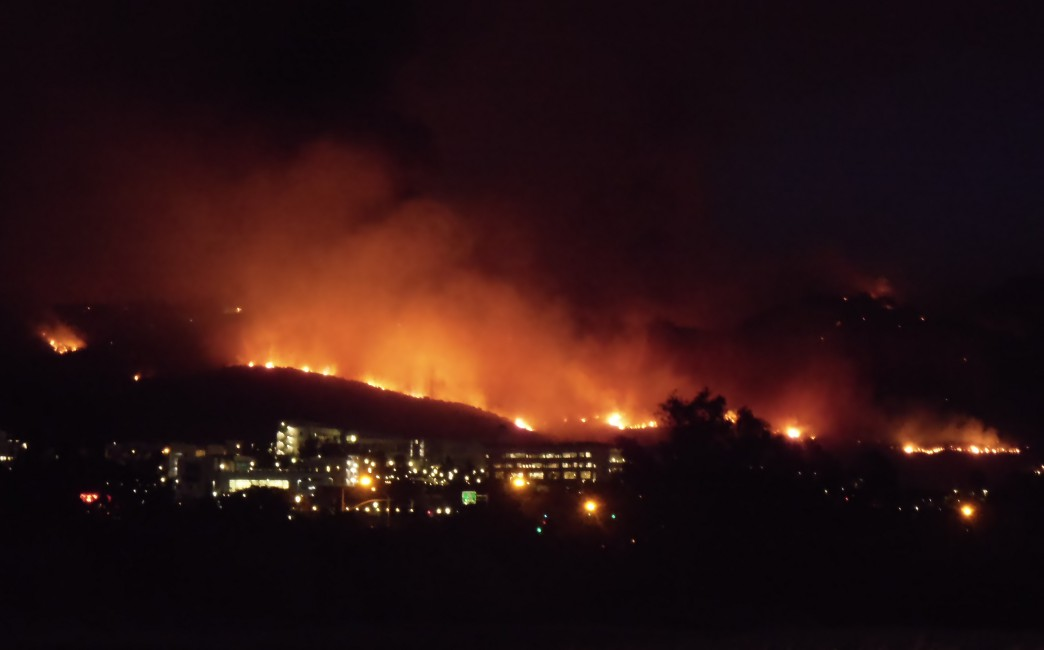
- The Cocos Fire burning above CSU San Marcos, on May 14, 2014
- Date: May 14, 2014 –; May 22, 2014
- Location: San Marcos, San Diego County, California
- Coordinates: 33.1137°N 117.1599°W

Statistics
- Burned area: 1,995 acres (8 km^{2})

Impacts
- Deaths: None reported
- Injuries: 3
- Structures destroyed: 40
- Cost: $5.7 million (2014 USD)

Ignition
- Cause: Arson
- Perpetrator: Unidentified juvenile

Map
- Location of fire in Southern California

Cocos Fire, originally known as the Twin Oaks Fire, was a wildfire that ignited on May 14, 2014 in San Marcos, California, in the hills south of California State University, San Marcos. The Cocos Fire quickly spread into western Escondido. The fire destroyed more than 40 buildings, including a dozen single-family homes. The Harmony Grove Spiritualist Association, a 13-acre spiritualist retreat founded in 1896, was particularly hard hit; most of the buildings and residences on the property were destroyed, and the association's president said, "We're pretty much wiped out." Property damage from the fire is estimated at more than $5.7 million. Three minor injuries have been reported. The Cocos Fire was the last of the May 2014 wildfires in San Diego County to be extinguished, with full containment on May 22, 2014.

== Fire ==
The Cocos Fire began at 5:38 PM PDT on May 14, and it had burned 400 acres (160 ha) by the evening of the same day. Flames were reported near homes, and the southeastern part of the city was ordered evacuated. By the morning of May 15, the Cocos Fire was the top priority for county firefighters. The fire grew overnight to 800 acres (320 ha) and was only 5% contained. Additional evacuations were announced. During the afternoon of May 15, the fire grew to 1,200 acres (490 ha). By the morning of May 16, the fire was still only 5% contained. At 6:30 PM PDT on May 22, the Cocos Fire was reported to be 100% contained, after it had reached 1,995 acres (8.07 km^{2}).

All schools in the San Marcos Unified School District were closed on May 15 and 16. California State University, San Marcos, was evacuated on May 14, along with the surrounding neighborhoods, in the midst of administering spring finals, and remained closed for the rest of the week. Additionally, commencement exercises scheduled for the weekend were also cancelled. Palomar College also closed May 15 and 16, and postponed its commencement ceremonies until the following week.

== Investigation and trial ==
On July 9, 2014, the San Diego County Sheriff's Department said that they believe the Cocos Fire was intentionally set by a 13-year-old juvenile. She had a hearing set in February 2015, and the trial was held in March 2015. On March 24, the then 14-year-old minor was found guilty of multiple counts of arson and one misdemeanor count of unlawfully allowing a fire to escape one's control. The judge concluded that she "intentionally and maliciously" set a fire in her Washingtonia Avenue backyard in San Marcos, and a blown ember from that Washingtonia Fire started the Cocos Fire. On May 27, the teenager was sentenced to 400 hours of community service, ordered to write letters to all the victims, and pay at least $40,000 in restitution. Additionally, the teen was ordered to enroll in a rehabilitation program known as Breaking Cycles 365, the goal of which is to prevent juveniles from becoming repeat offenders.

== Gallery ==
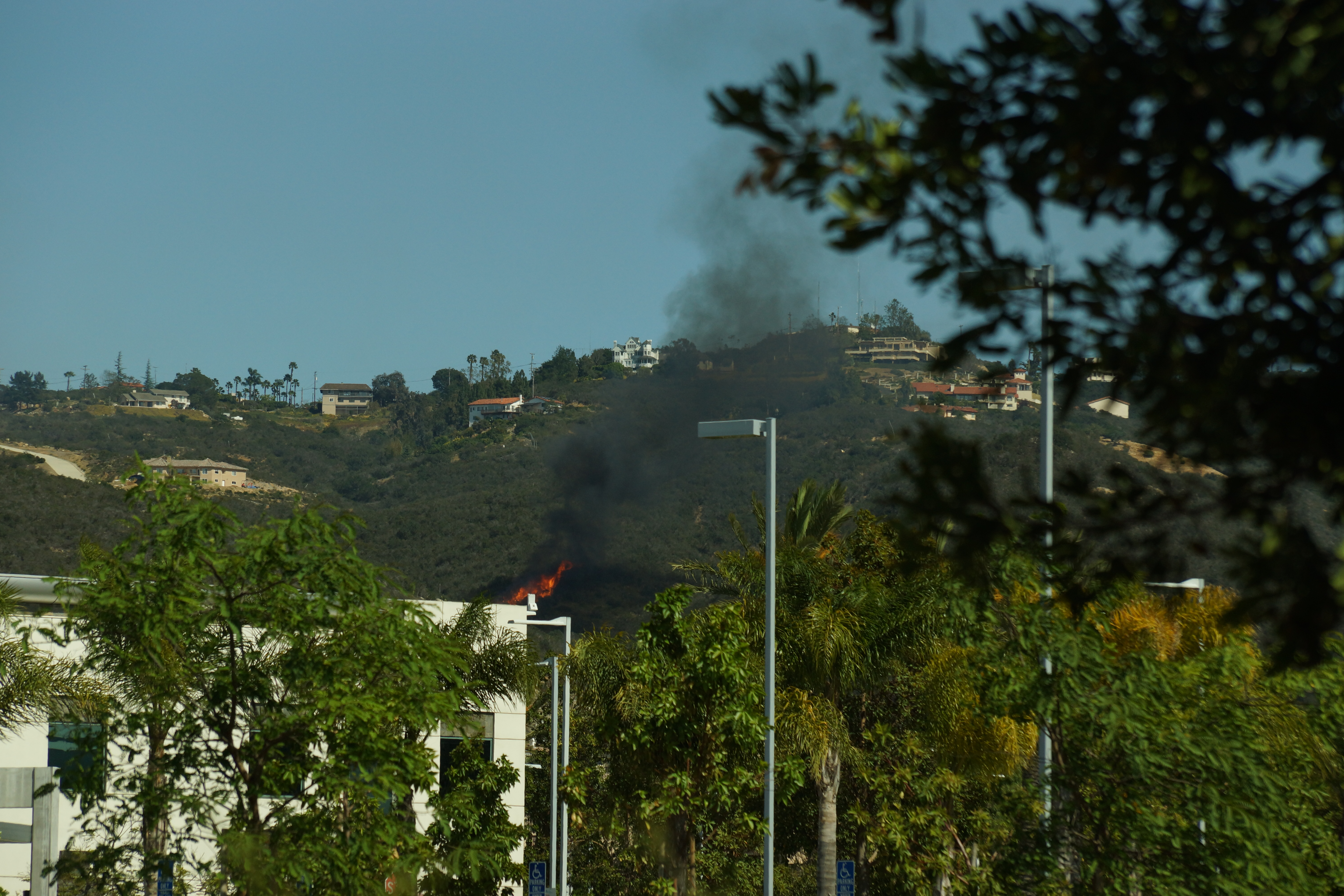
Start of the Cocos Fire, on May 14. This photo was used in the trial of the juvenile found guilty of setting the fire.

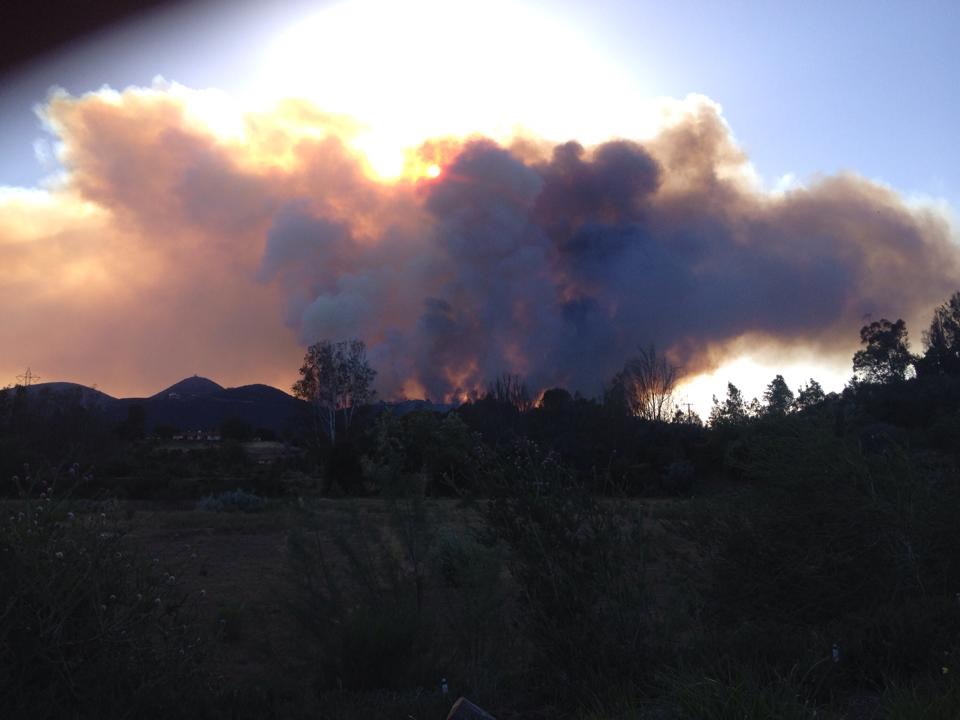
View of Cocos Fire burning near Stone Brewery in Escondido, CA

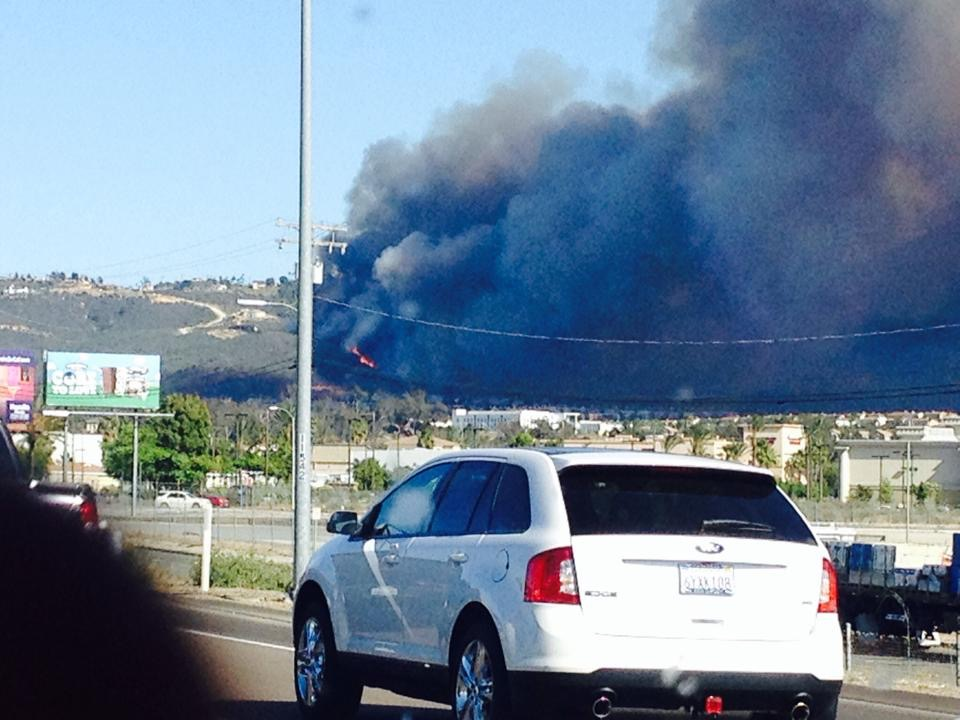
View of Cocos Fire from eastbound Highway 78

== See also ==
- December 2017 Southern California wildfires
- 2014 California wildfires
- May 2014 San Diego County wildfires
