= Happy Camp Complex Fire =

2014 wildfire in Northern California

- Part of the 2014 California wildfires
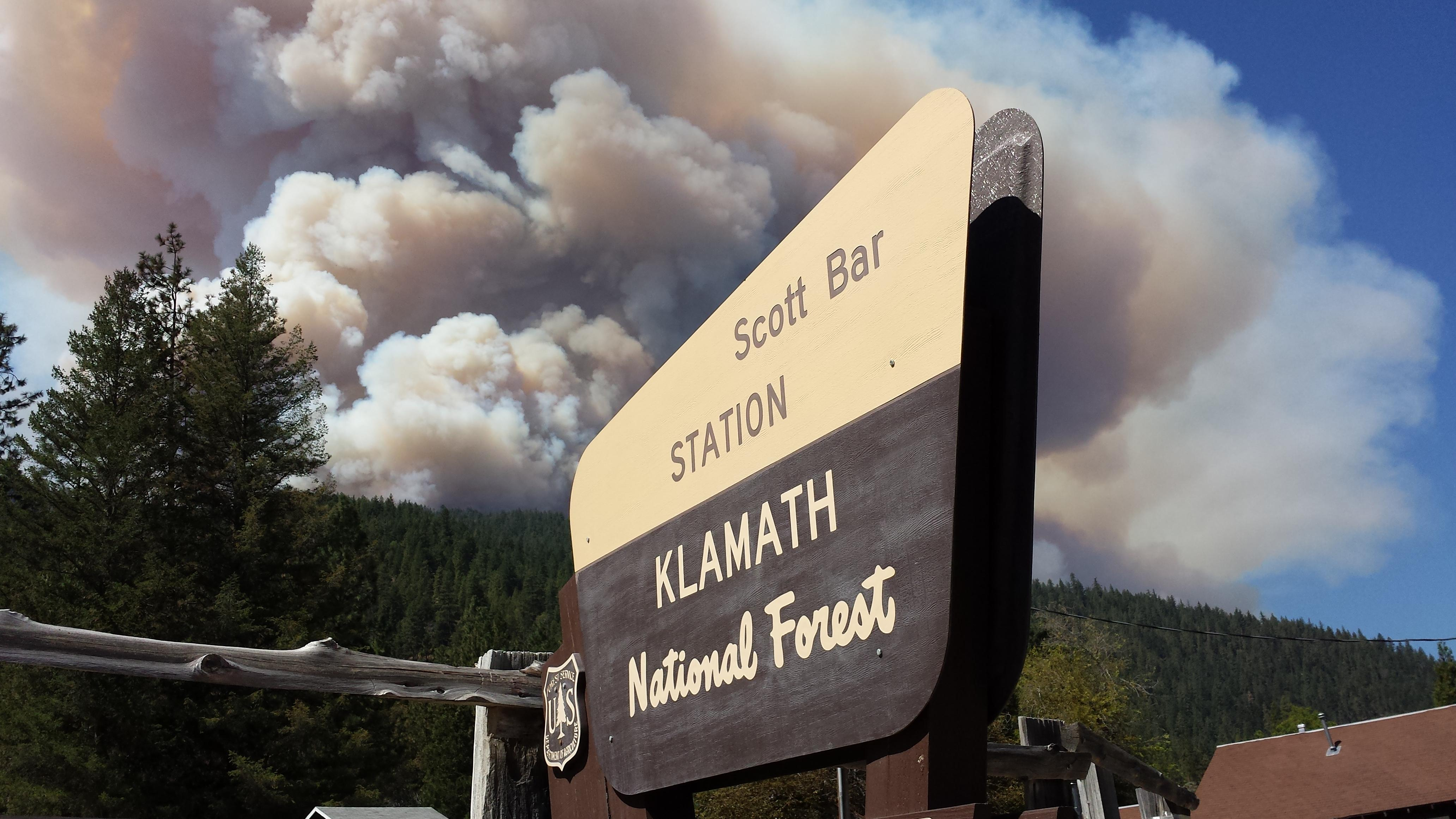
- Image of smoke rising from the Happy Camp Complex Fire.
- Date: August 12, 2014 –; October 31, 2014
- Location: Klamath National Forest, Happy Camp, California
- Coordinates: 41.796°N 123.374°W

Statistics
- Burned area: 134,056 acres (543 km^{2})

Impacts
- Cost: $88.2 million; (equivalent to about $114.8 million in 2024)

Ignition
- Cause: Lightning

Map
- Location of fire in Northern California

The Happy Camp Complex Fire was a massive wildfire that broke out on August 12, 2014, at 1:00 AM PDT, as a result of a lightning strikes in the Klamath National Forest in Northern California. The fire, which would eventually consume 134,056 acres (543 km^{2}) of land, was the largest fire of the 2014 California wildfire season and as of 2018, ranks 20th on the list of largest fires in state history.

== Progression ==
During the first couple of weeks, the wildfire gradually expanded to 22,926 acres (9,278 ha). However, during the following 4 weeks, the wildfire quickly spread to 130,496 acres (52,810 ha) by September 19, making the Happy Camp Complex the largest wildfire of the 2014 California wildfire season. The wildfire also ignited smaller spot fires to the northwest of the main fire, all the way up to a couple miles of the California-Oregon border. By September 21, the fire complex had reached 80% containment. On September 22, the Happy Camp Complex expanded to 131,996 acres (53,417 ha), but the containment remained at 85%. During the next 2 weeks, the Happy Camp Complex gradually increased in size, reaching 135,369 acres (54,782 ha) on September 27; however, the containment of the fire complex also reached 97% on the same day. On October 31, the Happy Camp Complex was finally extinguished by precipitation from a winter storm that was moving through California.

The total cost of suppressing the Happy Camp Complex was estimated by the National Interagency Fire Center at $88.2 million.

== See also ==
- Klamath Theater Complex Fire
