= California Historical Landmarks in Placer County =

List table of the properties and districts listed as California Historical Landmarks within Placer County, California.

- Note: Click the "Map of all coordinates" link to the right to view a Google map of all properties and districts with latitude and longitude coordinates in the table below.

== Listings ==
| Image | | Landmark name | Location | City or town | Summary |
|---|---|---|---|---|---|
| Auburn | 404 | Auburn | Historic district 38°53′55″N 121°04′28″W | Auburn | |
| Dutch Flat | 397 | Dutch Flat | Historic district 39°12′22″N 120°50′16″W | Dutch Flat | |
| Emigrant Gap | 403 | Emigrant Gap | Emigrant Gap Vista Pt, Interstate 80; 39°18′11″N 120°39′58″W | Emigrant Gap | |
| Foresthill | 399 | Foresthill | Historic district 39°01′10″N 120°50′10″W | Foresthill | |
| Gold Run | 405 | Gold Run | Historic district 39°10′51″N 120°51′21″W | Gold Run | |
| Griffith Quarry | 885 | Griffith Quarry | Taylor and Rock Springs Rds. 38°51′04″N 121°09′52″W | Penryn | |
| Iowa Hill | 401 | Iowa Hill | Historic district 39°06′31″N 120°51′34″W | Iowa Hill | |
| Lake Tahoe outlet gates | 797 | Lake Tahoe outlet gates | 73 N Lake Blvd. 39°10′00″N 120°08′36″W | Tahoe City | |
| Michigan Bluff | 402 | Michigan Bluff | Historic district 39°02′35″N 120°44′29″W | Michigan Bluff | |
| Ophir | 463 | Ophir | Historic district 38°53′28″N 121°07′25″W | Ophir | |
| Upload Photo | 799 | Overland Emigrant Trail | Big Bend Ranger Station, 2008 Hampshire Rocks Rd. | Soda Springs | |
| Upload Photo | 585 | Pioneer Express Trail | Folsom Lake State Recreation Area; 38°43′30″N 121°10′19″W | Folsom | |
| Pioneer Ski Area of America | 724 | Pioneer Ski Area of America | Cable Car Building; 39°11′48″N 120°14′09″W | Squaw Valley | |
| Transcontinental Railroad - Auburn | 780 | Transcontinental Railroad - Auburn | 639 Lincoln Way; 38°54′07″N 121°03′58″W | Auburn | Building now serves as a Chamber of Commerce |
| Transcontinental Railroad - Colfax | 780 | Transcontinental Railroad - Colfax | Grass Valley Street and Railroad Tracks in Railroad Park; 39°06′01″N 120°57′10″W | Colfax | |
| Transcontinental Railroad - Newcastle | 780 | Transcontinental Railroad - Newcastle | Main and Page Sts; 38°52′32″N 121°08′03″W | Newcastle | |
| Transcontinental Railroad - Rocklin | 780 | Transcontinental Railroad - Rocklin | Rocklin Rd and First St; 38°47′30″N 121°14′16″W | Rocklin | |
| Transcontinental Railroad - Roseville | 780 | Transcontinental Railroad - Roseville | Church St. & Washington Blvd. 38°45′04″N 121°17′10″W | Roseville | |
| Virginiatown | 400 | Virginiatown | 4725 Virginiatown Rd. 38°54′02″N 121°12′53″W | Newcastle | |
| Yankee Jims | 398 | Yankee Jims | Colfax Foresthill and Springs Garden Rds. 39°01′46″N 120°51′42″W | Foresthill | |

== See also ==
- List of California Historical Landmarks
- National Register of Historic Places listings in Placer County, California
