= Illinoistown, California =

Former unincorporated community in California

Illinoistown
- Former Unincorporated community
- Interactive map of Illinoistown
- Coordinates: 39°05′47″N 120°56′52″W
- Settled: 1849
- Annexed by Colfax: 1980
- Elevation: 739 m (2,425 ft)

Illinoistown (formerly Alder Grove and Upper Corral) was located on the divide between the Bear River and the North Fork of the American River about eighteen miles northeast of Auburn and seven miles west of Iowa Hill, California, United States. It was the western terminus of the Iowa Hill Road.

Originally inhabited by the Maidu and Miwok Native Americans, the first white settlers came here in 1849.

The area was annexed by Colfax in 1980.

== Founding ==
=== Alder Grove ===
The name Alder Grove was derived from the stand of alder trees that grew in the meadow below a large spring. This became a favorite camping spot.

The area could have been considered an outpost for the Hudson Bay Company, as several of the initial settlers were employees of that company.

In the summer of 1849, three merchants erected log buildings for trading posts: Sears A. Miller, John W. Piersons, and Mr. Neall. In August 1849, E. T. Mendenhall arrived and immediately established the first hotel—simply a tent to start with but soon replaced by a log house. Mendenhall used one part as a hotel, and Charles L. King and Horatio Hoskins operated the other half as a store. Hotel rooms rented for a dollar and a half a night ($65 in 2026 dollars).

=== Upper Corral ===
As more and more wagons arrived, a corral was built to hold the horses, and the location became known as Upper Corral.

=== Illinoistown ===
According to a possibly apocryphal story, in October 1849 a group of miners had a grand dinner, accompanied by a bottle of whisky, and as the participants were mostly from Illinois, they declared the name of the place to be Illinoistown

Illinoistown was not a precursor to the town of Colfax. and the residents of Illinoistown did not change the name to Colfax when the railroad came. These were two separate communities until Colfax annexed the area in 1980. Even now, people still refer to Illinoistown. However, the myth that Illinoistown was the basis for Colfax continues to circulate, and to be published in various sources and online.

== Initial prosperity ==
In early 1849 the California gold rush was about to explode. While Illinoistown itself did not have significant gold, its location on the road between Auburn and Iowa Hill and Nevada County was an excellent one for the trade in lumber (needed by the mines as well as the inhabitants), miner's supplies, other goods, and support for weary travelers. Illinoistown was second only to Auburn, a position it maintained until the arrival of the railroad in 1865.

E. J. Brickell built a lumber mill in 1851. By 1861, t had two sash saws, two lath saws, a capacity of 1,500,000 feet with a product of 500,000 feet and was valued at $4,000. E. T. Mendenhall bought a steam sawmill in 1853 from George B. Predmore and B. F. Warrener. It was known as the Mountain Mill. The Placer County Assessor valued the mill at $3,000 in 1857, with an annual production of $1,500,000. In 1859 Mendenhall ran ads in the Placer Herald saying “This mill has been thoroughly repaired, and the proprietor will now furnish lumber cheaper than can be had anywhere in the mountains.” These mills took advantage of the "great source of wealth" in the extensive local forests. The pine trees in the forests at the time of the Gold Rush could reach heights of 150 to 200+ feet with trunk diameters spanning 5 to 10 feet, depending on the species.

On September 11, 1852, Wells Fargo announced express rider service to Illinoistown. E. J. Brickell's Hotel was the 1852 election precinct for Placer County Township No. 4, which included Illinoistown, Iowa Hill, Dutch Flat, Gold Run, Towle (near present-day Alta), and Lisbon - the precursor to present-day Applegate. Jacob Keck was elected constable, a post he held for at least 16 years, E. J. Brickell was elected road commissioner, and B. Brickell was elected Justice.

The Illinoistown post office opened on November 2, 1853, with Barzillai Brickell as the first postmaster. Illinoistown Lodge No. 51 of the Free and Accepted Masons was chartered by the Grand Lodge of California on May 6, 1854, and continued meeting in Illinoistown until 1868, when it moved to its new building in Colfax. E. J. Brickell was a founding member.

The first school, established in 1854, was private and was taught by Frank Sanderson. The first public school, taught by Bluet, opened in 1858 in a former packinghouse. It continued to operate until 1872, even after Colfax was founded. In 1864, enrollment was 51, and by the school year 1866–1867 enrollment had grown to 212.

By 1861, Illinoistown boasted:

- E. J. Brickell's Illinoistown Hotel
- Mendenhall's Mill (for lumber)
- E. J. Brickell's Mill (for lumber)
- B. Brickell's Placer Exchange
- Jacob Keck's Blue Wing Saloon
- Two butchers
- A blacksmith
- Several merchants
- A cabinetmaker, and
- Numerous residents, including Charles Rice, the builder and proprietor of the Mineral Bar bridge and road between Iowa Hill and Illinoistown.

Illinoistown had an active social life as well. For example, in December 1864, Captain Hersey, the current owner of E. J. Brickell's Illinoistown Hotel, hosted a New Year's Ball in the hotel's "large dancing hall".

A cemetery was established on a hill east of the settlement. At some point, the headstones were dug up and buried so the property could be used for other purposes. The bodies may or may not have been moved to the Colfax Cemetery.

The first military company in Placer County, the California Blades, was organized in December 1849 to protect the white settlers from attacks by the local Indians, who understandably resisted having their lands overtaken. Congregating at Pierson's Hotel, 21 men signed up, with J. W. Gish as their captain.

Unfortunately, population numbers are unavailable because the census was done at the Township 4 level, with no detail as to the specific community where a person lived.

== Decline after founding of Colfax ==
1868 map showing Illinoistown, Colfax, and Iowa Hill

When the Transcontinental railroad came through the area, the new town of Colfax was created nearby. Many businesses relocated, and freight traffic for Nevada County switched to the new freight terminal. However, Illinoistown hung on because road traffic from Sacramento/Auburn to Colfax, Iowa Hill, Yankee Jims, and over the Sierra crest to the east still traveled through it. The advent of Ford's Model A in 1903 and his Model T in 1908 probably led to an increase in traffic, and in 1913 the road through town became part of the Lincoln Highway system, which became U.S. Route 40 in November 1926.

On November 11, 1858, Brickell held a Dedication Ball to celebrate the opening of the new hall adjoining his hotel. Tickets were $8.00. On March 19, 1870, Brickell's Hotel was destroyed by a fire of unknown origin, but he rebuilt and gave a "Grand Ball" on July 16, 1904, to celebrate, with 75 ladies present.

As mentioned above, the Illinoistown Masonic Lodge #51 did not move to Colfax until 1868 and the school remained in Illinoistown until 1872.

Again, no specific population numbers are available. However, the entire area around Colfax cast 76 votes in the 1926 General Election.

== Resurgence in the 1940s and 1950s ==
Starting in the mid-1940s, Illinoistown began a revival. The reasons are unclear—possibly involving the end of the Depression and the general economic revival that followed the end of World War II. Also, as mentioned above, Highway 40, the major cross-country route from Sacramento to New York City, was Illinoistown's main street.

The Illinoistown Fire Company held a kick-off meeting at the Midway Lodge on November 15, 1946, with Frank Miller as chief. On December 12, 1946, they presented a petition, signed by 67 taxpayers, to the Placer County Board of Supervisors (BOS). The petition was accepted and a hearing set. The area covered would not include the city of Colfax. On January 9, 1947 the BOS denied the request; however, the fire company continued to meet and order equipment, and in March 1947 they held a public demonstration.

On January 3, 1947, an item in the Colfax Record announced the formation of a baseball team in Illinoistown—the first one in 97 years. By the 10th, manager R. A. Libschick said that he had 30 prospective players. They played as part of the Foothill League.

Illinoistown acquired telephone service in April 1947.

As California entered its three-year celebration of statehood (1948–1951), the BOS approved a request by the Native Daughters of the Golden West to place a historical marker commemorating the founding of Illinoistown. The Illinoistown Marker was dedicated in a public ceremony on September 12, 1948.

Over time, Illinoistown hosted several service stations, at least one motel, several restaurants, and other businesses. For example, the "Illinoistown Business Directory" on December 13, 1946, listed the following:

- Chase Garage and Service Station
- Evans Snake Farm
- Midway Lodge & Restaurant
- Richfield Service Station

According to an old photo, the Tee Pee Diner was founded in 1949. A listing in 1951 included a Texaco station run by Mr. and Mrs. Bledsoe, and a 1953 listing mentioned a Nugget Café run by Martin and Alice Castle. Harry's Club was mentioned in the paper on August 24, 1956, and Alice and Betty's Café had an ad the following week.

In November 1956, R. L. Spencer, a real estate development firm in Redwood City, announced plans for a “modern business center” on 15 acres in Illinoistown.

Once again, no specific population counts are available, but the number of votes cast gives an indication of the growth in the area. By the 1950 general election, Illinoistown had grown to have two voting precincts and in 1966 the number of precincts increased to three. 1966 is the last year that votes were available. Compared with the 76 votes cast in the 1926 General Election for the entire area surrounding Colfax (mentioned above):

Illinoistown Votes
Year	Votes
1942	110
1944	179
1946	176
1948	292
1950	303
1952	352
1954	296
1956	264
1958	292
1960	320
1962	405
1964	503
1966	468

== Cut off by Highway 40, then Interstate 80 ==
In 1955 the State Division of Highways auctioned several properties in Illinoistown, both businesses and residences, in preparation for the widening of Highway 40. In December 1957, portions of the widened highway opened in the area. Highway 40 was soon designated as Interstate 80. This signaled the beginning of another decline for Illinoistown because the traffic that used to go through town now bypassed it.

== Annexation by Colfax ==
The final blow to an independent Illinoistown was annexation by Colfax in 1980, 131 years after its founding. The benefit was having city-provided water and sewer services.

== Roadside attractions ==
=== Snake Farm (AKA Illinoistown Museum) ===
The Snake Farm, owned by Mrs. and Mrs. Evans, opened some time prior to 1939, and featured many rattlesnakes in an open pit. In June 1941, John L. Ottman committed suicide by breaking into the Snake Farm one night and climbing into the rattlesnake pit. August 1947 saw the California Fair Shows carnival pitching its tents near the Snake Farm. The Tee Pee was added in late 1947 (see below). The Illinoistown Museum was added in 1952 by the Heplers, who had recently purchased the business. It also served as the contact point for the Illinoistown Fire Department prior to the availability of telephone service.

=== "Tee Pee" ===
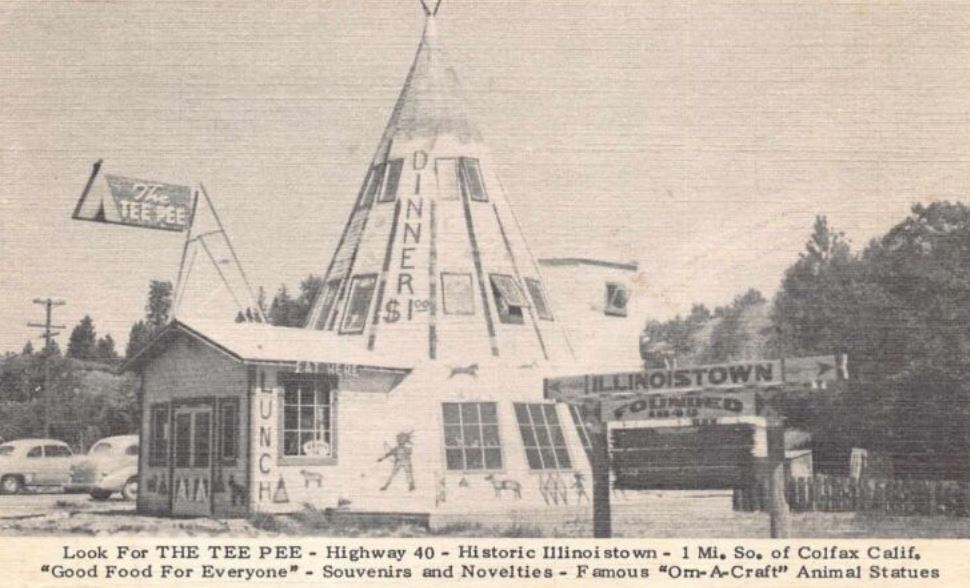
Tee Pee Diner

Originally called the Tee Pee Trading Post and Lodge, the business went by many variations, all containing the words "Tee Pee." It was appended to the Snake Farm, and opened in 1947. It changed hands many times; also closed and reopened on several occasions and was finally torn down in 1986.
