= Iowa Hill Road =

Road in Placer County, California

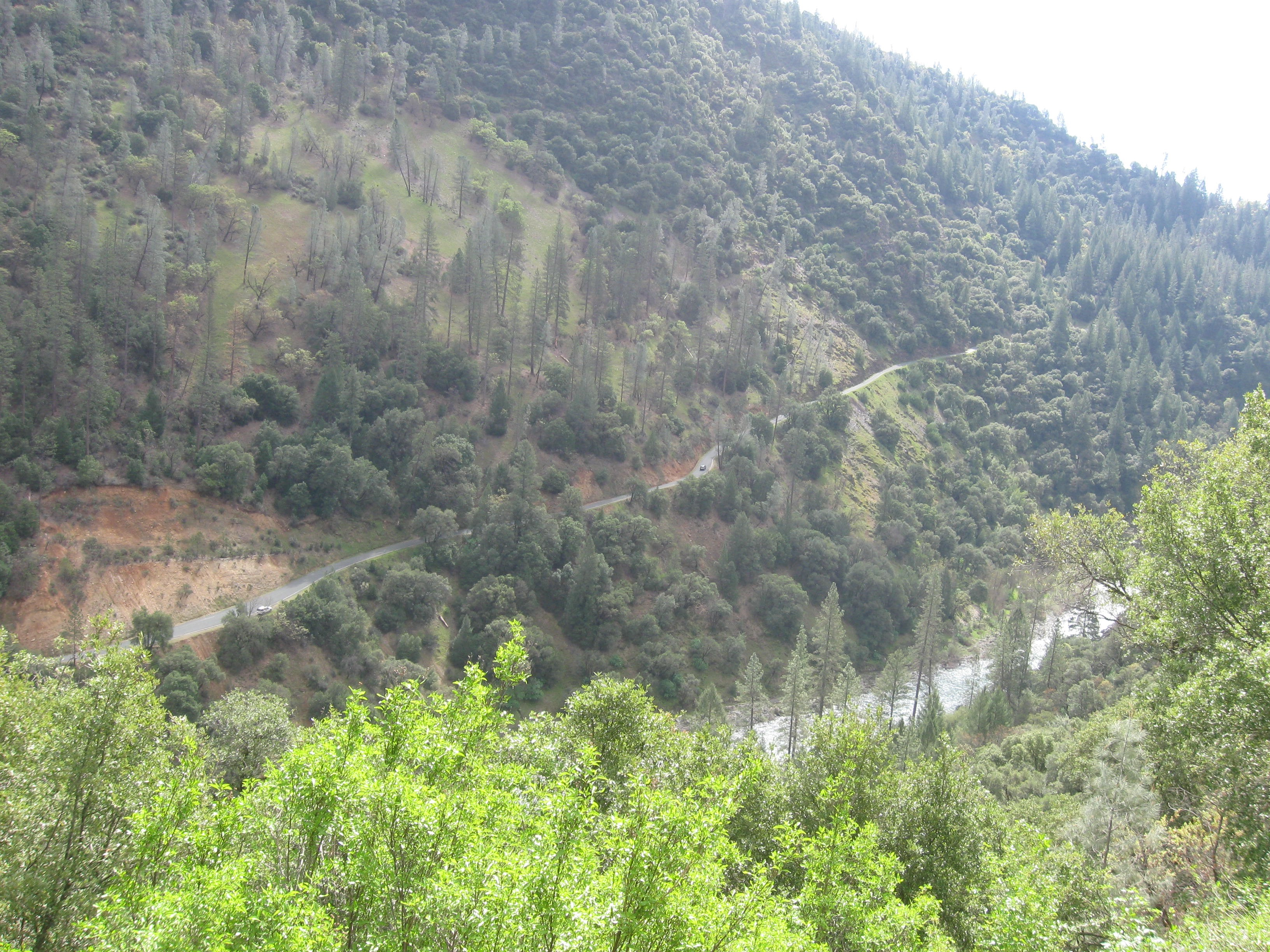
Iowa HIll Road

Iowa Hill Road is a "narrow and serpentine" road in Placer County, California. It is in the foothills of the Sierra Nevada. It connects the town of Colfax (elevation 2,425 feet) with the Sugar Pine Reservoir (elevation 3,609 feet), passing through the historic gold mining community of Iowa Hill (elevation 2,861 feet). It parallels the North Fork American River.

Outdoor writer Tom Stienstra wrote "Of all the paved roads in California, a 5-mile section of Iowa Hill Road in the Sierra foothills is among the narrowest, curviest and steepest. In one stretch, the road is carved into a canyon wall that towers over the North Fork American River, with a precipitous drop below to your right. Sierra Nevada Geotourism says "the winding and very narrow road is dangerous with steep cliffs and not recommended for trailers." Roseville, California journalist Todd Schofield calls a trip on the road an "adrenaline-rush, white knuckle journey".

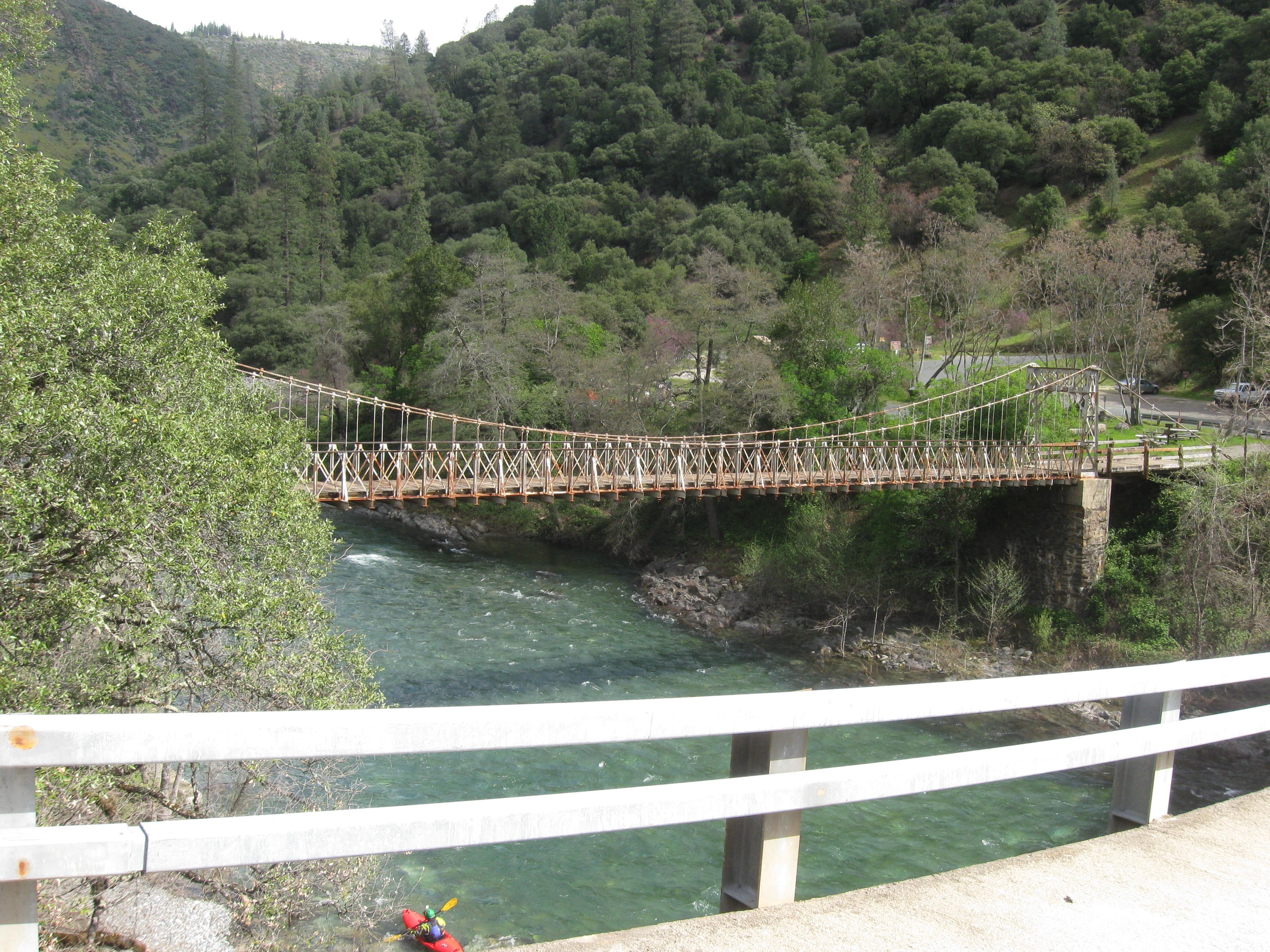
Historic Iowa Hill Bridge

The road formerly crossed the Iowa Hill Bridge, a wire suspension bridge that was built in 1928. A more modern bridge was built in 1985, and the old bridge is now a pedestrian bridge.
