= Virginiatown =

Virginiatown may refer to:

- Virginiatown, Ontario, Canada
- Virginiatown, California, United States
