= Illinoistown =

Illinoistown may refer to:

- East St. Louis, Illinois
- Illinoistown, California
