= A Deal in Wheat and Other Stories of the New and Old West =

Short story collection by Frank Norris

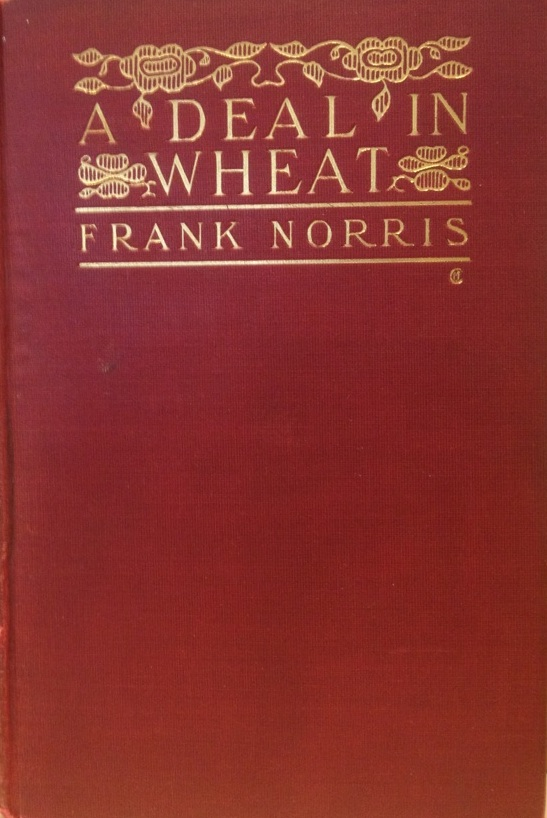
- Author: Frank Norris
- Original title: A Deal in Wheat and Other Stories of the New and Old West
- Language: English
- Genre: American literature
- Published: 1903
- Publisher: Doubleday, Page & Company
- Publication place: United States
- Media type: Print
- Pages: 272

A Deal in Wheat and Other Stories of the New and Old West is a collection of short stories written by the American author Frank Norris. It was published posthumously in 1903 by Doubleday, Page & Company and composed primarily of recently published works.

== The stories ==
- "A Deal in Wheat"
- "The Wife of Chino"
- "A Bargain with Peg-Leg"
- "The Passing of Cock-Eye Blacklock"
- "A Memorandum of Sudden Death"
- "Two Hearts that Beat as One"
- "The Dual Personality of Sick Dick Nickerson"
- "The Ship That Saw a Ghost"
- "The Ghost in the Crosstrees"
- "The Riding of Felipe"

== Plot summary and character list ==
=== "A Deal in Wheat" ===
The story A Deal in Wheat was first published as a serial in 1902 before being published posthumously as part of this collection the following year. It is a five part story about wheat speculation at the Chicago Board of Trade. As wheat prices fall in the midst of an economic feud between two influential speculators, the story's protagonist, a wheat farmer from Kansas, loses his farm. The book ends with the farmer relocating to Chicago, where he is denied free bread due to rising wheat prices. Influenced by naturalism, which the author contrasted with the realism. The latter he found to be too superficial, honing in on the "accuracy" of surface details, while naturalism he understood to dramatize the "truth" to expose the relations between people from different segments and classes underlying the everyday experiences of life.

==== Plot ====
I. The first of the five sections of the story, entitled "The Bear- Wheat at Sixty-Two", takes place in rural Kansas. Sam Lewiston leaves his wife, Emma, home on the ranch while he goes into town one last time to try to sell his wheat to Bridges & Co., Grain Dealers before being forced out of the market. At sixty-two cents a bushel, Lewiston can no longer afford to raise wheat and must take a job with his wife’s brother in Chicago.

II. The next section, "The Bull- Wheat at a Dollar-Ten", introduces the two main players of the Chicago-run wheat business, the bear and the bull: Treslow and Hornung. When Treslow had let the price fall to sixty-two cents, Hornung had almost run him out of business. Instead, Mr. Gates makes a deal with Treslow, on behalf of Hornung, to sell him one hundred thousand bushels for export at $1.10 each.

III. Hornung has grown to dominate wheat sales at $1.50 a bushel. One day in "The Pit", a mysterious man named Kennedy sells one thousand bushels to three of Hornung’s men: Going, Kimbark, and Merriam. They get word that a total of twenty-five thousand bushels are being sold in Chicago by someone other than Hornung. Hornung instructs them to continue buying but, with The Bear supposedly out of the market, they do not know who they are buying from.

IV. The fourth section, "The Belt Line", takes place in Hornung’s home. His broker, Billy, and a detective named Cyrus Ryder are there to discuss the now eighty thousand bushels he has purchased. Ryder reveals that the bushels are the same ones that Treslow had purchased to export. He had been shuttling them around the city on trains, making it appear as if they had just arrived. Hornung laughs upon finding out he has been cheated, and decides to further raise the price.

V. The final section of the story, "The Bread Line", describes Sam Lewiston’s life in Chicago. He stands in the bread line with many other poor, hungry workers who rely on the bakery’s nightly giveaways, but the price of wheat has put too much of a strain on the bakery. Lewiston manages to find work as a street cleaner and climb the rankings to success but, because of his experiences as a farmer and a worker, his resentment towards the operators of the wheat business will not die.

==== Character list ====
- Sam Lewiston
- Emma Lewiston
- Truslow
- Mr. Gates
- Hornung
- Going
- Kimbark
- Merriam
- Kennedy
- Billy
- Cyrus Ryder

=== "The Wife of Chino" ===
==== Plot ====
I. The story starts off with "Chino’s Wife", in which Lockwood, the superintendent of the Hand-over-fist Gravel Mine in Placer County, California, sits in solitude on his porch smoking tobacco after dinner. He graduated from the Columbia School of Mines and has since spent his life in isolated Western mining communities. He enjoys isolation, and spends every evening admiring the scenery and fantasizing about Felice Zavalla, a beautiful Mexican woman married to one of his employees.

II. "Madness", documents Lockwood’s strong desire to be married to Felice despite his inability to understand her. He has never seen the world or socialized much, having studied for the first part of his life and worked for the latter. His isolation causes him to get carried away with emotions, and he is convinced he should have Felice.

III. In "Chino Goes to Town", Lockwood begins finding excused to interact with Felice, such as to give her mail, until he at once realizes that he has crossed the line and begins to avoid her entirely. He, instead, buries himself in his work until an accident in the mine breaks his foot. He usually goes to the Iowa Hill Post Office every couple of weeks with Chino to deliver the brick of gold collected from the mine, but his injury prevents him from going. He is left with nothing but thoughts of Felice to ease the pain.

IV. In the section, "A Dispatch from the Express Messenger", Felice confronts Lockwood and asks why he has been avoiding her. She gave him a look that told him she had made a mistake with Chino. Just when Lockwood realizes that he will not keep himself from having an affair with Felice he gets a message from Iowa Hill informing him of a criminal named Reno Kid on the trail. The messenger advises him not to leave, but Chino was already on his way. Lockwood realizes he has no other options, and struggles his way onto a horse and takes off.

V. "The Trail" documents Lockwood’s pursuit of Chino. He almost reaches Iowa Hill with no sign of him or Reno Kid, so he turns around to search harder. He eventually hears a horse galloping in the darkness and assumes it to be Reno Kid and shoots, but it is Chino.

VI. "The Discovery of Felice" begins when Lockwood arrives back at the Zavalla’s house and confesses his actions to Felice. Felice fetches the doctor and, as he examines Chino’s wound, she tells Lockwood that now they can be together. Lockwood, however, suddenly sees Felice in a different light. She appears savage and unfaithful.

==== Character list ====
- Lockwood
- Felice Zavalla
- Chino Zavalla
- Reno Kid

=== "A Bargain with Peg-Leg" ===
==== Plot ====
This story describes Bunt McBride’s account of Peg-Leg Smith, an infamous one-legged criminal. Bunt retells the story on his break from the night shift at the mine.

Peg-Leg amputated his own leg and fashioned himself one from a tree stump after he was shot. He was known for his nastiness and spent his life trying to get people to stop using cuss words. Bunt encountered him at a bar in Yuma when Bunt was just a teenager. He was there watching his friend, Clarense, play a gambling game with some men that involved taking their temperatures. Clarence won, and the guys start accusing him of cheating. Peg-Leg had been sleeping in the back room, but he appeared and tackled Clarence from across the room. Bunt jumped to Clarence’s defense and pulled off Peg-Leg’s leg. Knowing he was in trouble, he chucked the wood out the window, grabbed Peg-Leg’s gun from the back room, and took off across the street. Outside, a kid had gone to retrieve the leg and went to hand it to Peg-Leg, but Bunt grabbed it. Peg-Leg assured Bunt that he would come after him someday. Bunt knew what Peg-Leg is capable of and did not want to live in fear, but he also knew his weakness, so he made a deal with Peg-leg to never swear again in exchange for his safety. Peg-Leg was desperate to have at least one convert, so he gave in.

Three years later, Bunt says, he came across Peg-Leg again in Sonora, Arizona. The town was full of men seeking gold. He got word that a hotel was on fire and rushed over to see Peg-Leg at the window of the flaming building. People below were yelling for him to jump, promising to catch him on a blanket. Bunt starts chucking before he can finish the story. There hadn’t been a blanket there.

==== Character list ====
- Bunt McBride
- Peg-Leg Smith
- Clarence

=== "The Passing of Cock-Eye Blacklock" ===
==== Plot ====
This story, like the last, describes Bunt McBride’s account of the life of a Western criminal, Cock-Eye Blacklock. Bunt and the narrator finish dinner by the campfire and ride out into the Idaho desert because it is Bunt’s night to ride the herd. Bunt has lived in the West for a long time and is wise when it comes to herding.

Bunt begins his story by recounting a herding experience in a Nevada blizzard. He and Cock-Eye Blacklock rubbed tobacco juice in their eyes to stay awake. Blacklock was a bad man and had killed a lot of people. Bunt says that he went bad about two years after that, though, He traveled around gambling, taking all the money from a community before moving on. He got through New Mexico and Arizona and was making his way through Nevada when he shot a kid in Reno and headed up to a mining camp in Placer County, California. He immediately got into trouble there, too, and before long was driven out of camp.

Bunt lived nearby in Iowa Hill at the time, and he used to take weekly fishing trips to the American River with his boss. On one trip they noticed that all the fish had been shot out of the river. The Fish Commissioners of the State assigned a guard to the area, but the fish kept dying. Blacklock was an obvious suspect, so Bunt, the Boss, and a marshal set up shooting boxes in trees to stand watch and try to catch him in the act. Unsuccessful for weeks, they caught a break one day with the help from a local dog named Sloppy Weather. Blacklock threw dynamite into the water to kill the fish, but Sloppy Weather jumped in to fetch the dynamite and bring it back. Blacklock ran, but the dog chased him until the dynamite went off and they both got caught in the explosion. On his grave they wrote, "Moral: A hook and line is good enough fish-tackle for any honest man".

The sun rises over the desert just as Bunt finishes the story. He and the narrator ride back into camp.

==== Character list ====
- Bunt McBride
- Cock-Eye Blacklock
- Narrator
- The boss
- The marshal
- Sloppy Weather

=== "A Memorandum of Sudden Death" ===
==== Plot ====
In this story the narrator reads a manuscript written by Arthur Staples Karslake just before he died while serving in the United States Cavalry. The narrator has no personal connection to the author but has received permission from Patterson Karslake, the author’s brother, to publish the manuscript. He gets it form Juan Tejada, a harness-maker in Albuquerque, who has been keeping it for a bone collector by the name of Bass while he is on a trip in the Klondike. Parts of the manuscript are in pen and parts are in pencil. The narrator interjects periodically while reading the manuscript to explain that the pieces are in fragments.

The manuscript begins with Bunt, Idaho, Estorijo, and Karslake spotting 8 Native Americans following them while they are jogging. They stop to get water, and Karslake writes the first account while they are stopped. In it he refers to them as "bucks". They continue on, and the next day it appears as if there are 9. The "bucks" charge towards them, but veer off at the last minute, then circle around and continue following them. They constantly move in and out of shooting range, but Idaho manages to kill one of them. Shots are fired periodically, but each day the four men continue on and each night they set up camp. On the fifth and final day of the account Bunt, Idaho, Estorijo, and all of their horses have died. Karsdale describes a feeling of revelation he experiences as he weakens and death grows closer. He explains that, as death is upon him, he begins to understand the secret of life. He identifies himself and the other men he was with, and he leaves his unfinished work to his brother, Patterson Karslake.

==== Character list ====
- Arthur Staples Karslake
- Patterson Karslake
- Juan Tejada
- Bass
- Luis Estorijo
- Idaho
- Bunt

=== "Two Hearts That Beat as One" ===
==== Plot ====
In this story, Bunt McBride, shocked that Mr. Dixon is not familiar with The Three Black Crows, retells a story of one of their missions on the Pacific arranged, as usual, by Cyrus Ryder. This story is the first of four in the collection about The Three Black Crows.

Barreto Palachi was a revolutionary trying to get to San Francisco to smuggle arms, but he could not get there without being arrested. Cyrus Ryder sent Bunt, Hardenberg, Strokher, and Ally Bazan to meet with Palachi’s agent, Esperanza Ulivarri. Bunt was not looking forward to the meeting, as he notes that he is not good with females. Esperanza instructed the four men on how to meet Palachi in San Diego, and gave them half of a calling card to match with the other half that she was to give him. They were struck by her beauty, and Hardenberg and Strokher immediately began fighting over who would have her when they left her office. The arguing continued aboard the schooner, and on a calm day they held a boxing match. It was very competitive but ended in a draw.

When they arrived in the San Diego Harbor Esperanza and another woman appeared in a rowboat. The woman was Palachi in disguise and, while he climbed aboard, Hardenberg and Strokher both get into the rowboat and stay behind with Esperanza.

==== Character list ====
- Bunt McBride
- Hardenberg
- Strokher
- Ally Bazan
- Cyrus Ryder
- Mr. Dixon
- Barreto Palachi
- Esperanza Ulivarri

=== "The Dual Personality of Slick Dick Nickerson" ===
==== Plot ====
I. The first section of this story takes place in Cyrus Ryder’s office in San Francisco. The Three Crows, Hardenberg, Strokher, and Ally Bazan, are ready for their next assignment, and are considering sailing to Point Barrow in Alaska where some Russians are hunting sea otters. Their skins can be sold to China for great profit. Ryder tells them that an agent of his named Dick Nickerson must accompany them. He used to be a Methodist preacher but he hit his head one day and, when he regained consciousness, he had no memory of his past. A month after this meeting the team departed on the Bertha Miller.

II. The sail to Alaska is a rough journey filled with poor weather and freezing temperatures. They finally arrive and locate the hunters, to whom they pretend to be a rescue boat searching for survivors from a nearby steam whaler wreck. Strokher remains onboard while the others befriend the Russians, get them drunk, and steal the otter skins.

III. The Bertha Miller departs, but Dick Nickerson takes a bad fall on the deck and hits his head. His condition improves after a few days, but he does not remember why they are there. The others explain the purpose of their mission and show him the skins to try to probe his memory. They arrive in Juneau and, immediately upon disembarking, Dick goes to the customs office. He tells an officer that he is a Methodist minister being detained on a pirate ship with stolen goods. The Three Crows frantically leave the port and, thinking they are being pursued by a U.S. cutter, burn the otter skins. The cutter approaches, and two men on board inform them that their crewmember broke into the American consul and resisted arrest.

==== Character list ====
- Cyrus Ryder
- Hardenberg
- Strokher
- Ally Bazan
- Dick Nickerson

=== "The Ship That Saw a Ghost" ===
==== Plot ====
In this story Mr. Dixon describes a dangerous mission, B. 300, he attempted with The Three Black Crows aboard the Glarus. Everyone thought they were heading back up to San Francisco from Callao but, in fact, they were traveling further south. Dixon says that the mission gave the Glarus a bad reputation, and now no one in the San Francisco Bay Area is willing to take her out again. They think she is haunted.

The sailors had seen nothing but ocean for days, and the isolation was getting to them. They were looking for an island that a boat had come across 200 years prior. Dixon does not say what they did there for fear of getting in trouble with the maritime law, but it was evil. As they were leaving the island something came out of the sea that killed twenty men within a week. After another week there were six men remaining, and they all died on the island. Dixon recalls that each of the men on the Glarus felt uneasy about the mission. He felt like they were being watched. One night Strokher said he fell asleep while on watch and awoke to find a ship in the distance. It was unusual looking, with three masts and no sails, and looked abandoned and frightening. The same night their shaft broke. They decided to continue for the island, but for days the wind would not let them budge. They had no choice but to turn around and saw the old ship in the distance behind them as they left. Upon returning to San Francisco the word spread that the Glarus had seen a ghost, and she has not seen the sea since.

==== Character list ====
- Mr. Dixon
- Strokher
- Hardenberg
- Ally Bazan

=== "The Ghost in the Crosstrees" ===
==== Plot ====
I. Cyrus Ryder wants to claim a new island, the Island of Paa, so he calls upon the Three Black Crows. It had previously been discovered by "Old Rosemary", but be had died while his title application was being processed. Ryder knows that great profit lies within the island in the form of nitrate beds. Another man named Petersen is also after the island, so he stresses the urgency to Hardenberg, Strokher, and Ally Bazan. They agree to fix up the Idaho Loss to take on the mission.

II. Mr. Dixon, the story’s narrator, goes to visit the three men at the port in Oakland where they are working on the boat. He stays over, and wakes up in the middle of the night to find Hardenberg staring at something in the air behind him.

III. Hardenberg tells Dixon of a moving figure in the crosstrees of the foremast. They witness the figure raise the sails and then disappear. They decide not to tell the others in the morning, but it comes out when Ally Bazan asks why the sails are raised. Ally Bazan is scared, but the other three stand watch the next night and chase it off. The following night all four of them stand watch, but it does not return for three nights. They stop watching, and wake up to raised sails in the morning.

IV. The ghost only appears when Ally Bazan is not standing watch. Ally Bazan does not want to take the haunted boat to sea. Strokher falls ill, so the Three Crows decide to abort the mission. Two years later, Dixon and Ally Bazan are on a duck-hunting trip when the same figure appears. As it is hoisting the jib its face catches the light, and Dixon identifies Ally Bazan as the figure. He asks Ally Bazan if he sleepwalks, but never brings up the ghost.

==== Character list ====
- Cyrus Ryder
- Petersen
- Strokher
- Hardenberg
- Ally Bazan
- Mr. Dixon

=== "The Riding of Felipe" ===
==== Plot ====
I. In the first section, entitled "Felipe", Felipe Arillaga leaves the home of Rubia Ytuerate, where he has lived for three months having an affair with Rubia. He misses his wife, Buelna Martiarena, but Rubia is furious and vows to curse the woman who Felipe next kisses. Felipe is superstitious and stops to confess at the mission, but he runs into Buelna and her uncle, Old Martiarena. He kisses Buelna’s hand, but can offer no explanation when Old Martiarena demands to know why he won’t kiss her. Buelna rides away, leaving Felipe heartbroken.

II. The next section is called "Unzar". Felipe, after a month of misery from losing Buelna, stops for the night at Lopez Catala’s wine shop on a ride home from Monterey. Unzar Ytuerate arrives looking for Felipe, for he is Rubia’s brother and has been sent to kill him. The two begin fighting with knives.

III. In "Rubia", Felipe wakes up in a bed and the inn with bandages on his head and shoulder. Rubia is there, and she explains that a week after sending Unzar for him she realized her mistake. She professes her love for Felipe, but Felipe insists that he loves Buelna. Rubia kisses Felipe, besetting her curse upon herself. Unzar is dying, so Rubia rushes to his bedside. He yells at her for not standing by him after driving him into the fight, then he dies. Rubia repeats the words of her curse, realizing that it has come true.

IV. The final section, "Buelna", begins when Felipe stops at the Rancho Martiarena and demands to talk to Buelna. Rafael, the superintendent, tells him that she left for Santa Teresa that day and will become a nun at midnight. Felipe rushes away to try to stop her. The journey to Santa Teresa is long and Pepe, Felipe’s horse, struggles quite a bit towards the end. After many obstacles, they arrive just as Buelna is kneeling at the altar. They kiss in the middle of the church, and get married the following day. Two days later a beautiful woman drowns in a river near Lopez Catala’s wine shop.

==== Character list ====
- Felipe Arillaga
- Rubia Ytuerate
- Buelna Martiarena
- Old Martiarena
- Unzer Ytuerate
- Lopez Catala
- Rafael
- Pepe

== Themes ==
- Early culture and life in the American West
- The American Cowboy (Dean)
- Interactions between Americans and Spaniards (Dillingham 79)
- Interactions between Americans and Native Americans
- Women as destructive figures (Dillingham 90)
- Supernatural beings
- Inhumanness of capitalism (McElrath and Crisler 396)
- Justice and the fate of dishonest men
- Isolation in nature

== Critical reception ==
Critics felt that many of Norris' short stories lacked the substance and purpose that his novels possessed. Though short stories and essays, including this collection, were published after The Pit, they did not affect Norris' reputation as he was viewed primarily as a novelist. Bixler notes, however, "the scattered reviews of these books were not flattering" (Bixler 119). Some stories were described as merely anecdotal, while stories like "The Ship That Saw a Ghost" were enjoyed for their "sensational value" (Dillingham 172). Franklin Walker describes "The Wife of Chino" as an "ineffective melodrama" (Walker 288).

== Other ==
Frank Norris preferred writing novels to short stories, but he understood that, once he had established himself as a successful American novelist, he would be able to sell short stories and articles to periodicals to make additional money. As a result, a number of his short stories were thrown together during times when he needed an additional income. Norries wrote "A Memorandum of Sudden Death", "A Bargain with Peg-Leg", and "The Passing of Cock-Eye Blacklock" so that he could afford to buy his wife, Jeanette Black, a Christmas present (Walker 286).

A 1909 film directed by D.W. Griffith, A Corner in Wheat, was based on Norris' "A Deal in Wheat", along with his 1903 novel The Pit.
