= Bunch Creek =

Stream in Placer County, California, U.S.

Bunch Creek is a stream in Placer County, California, United States. Bunch Creek is a tributary to the North Fork of the American River, which confluence is to the east at 920 feet (280 m) elevation. In reaching that confluence, Brush Creek flows through Bunch Canyon. The water quality in Bunch Creek is characterized by low turbidity, and is free of odor; trout were being caught in the creek according to a 1989 survey.(Earth Metrics, 1989)

== History ==
The history of the town of Colfax, California is intertwined with Bunch Creek. During the Gold Rush of the mid-19th century, miners and trappers of this part of Placer County found a place along Bunch Creek that was generally below the snow line; this place became known as Illinoistown. With the passage of time, and the increase in gold mining activities, the camp grew. It became a village with a general store, saloons, freight company and even a brothel.(Colfax, 2005) This settlement later became known as Colfax.

== Notes ==
- Colfax, California History (2005)
- Earth Metrics Inc, "Phase I Environmental Site Assessment, Bunch Creek Shopping Center, Colfax, California", printed in San Mateo, Ca., Document File Number 7928W0, May 16, 1989

== See also ==
- Placer mining

39.036287°N 120.908550°W
