= A Corner in Wheat =

1909 film directed by D. W. Griffith

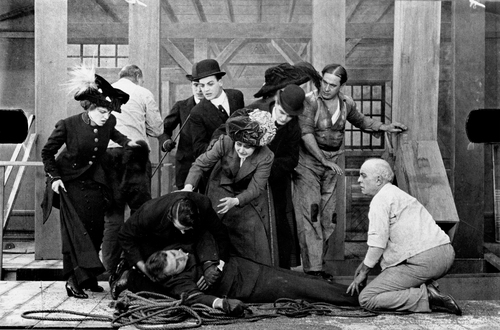
- The dead wheat king at the grain elevator
- Directed by: D. W. Griffith
- Written by: Frank Norris (book)
- Starring: Frank Powell; Grace Henderson; James Kirkwood; Linda Arvidson; W. C. Miller; Gladys Egan; H. B. Walthall; Blanche Sweet
- Cinematography: G. W. Bitzer
- Distributed by: American Mutoscope and Biograph Company
- Release date: December 13, 1909
- Running time: approx. 15 minutes
- Country: United States
- Language: Silent (English intertitles)

A Corner in Wheat is a 1909 American short silent film which tells of a greedy tycoon who tries to corner the market in wheat, destroying the lives of the people who can no longer afford to buy bread. It was directed by D. W. Griffith and adapted by Griffith and Frank E. Woods from a novel and a short story by Frank Norris, titled The Pit and "A Deal in Wheat". Griffith may have had a real-life inspiration: six months earlier, James A. Patten had actually cornered the market in wheat, and in some cities, the price of bread doubled from five cents to ten, just as in the movie.

In 1994, A Corner in Wheat was selected for preservation in the United States National Film Registry by the Library of Congress as being "culturally, historically, or aesthetically significant".

== Plot ==
Two men sow a field by hand, while a third plows. Meanwhile, the "wheat king" comes up with idea to corner the market in the grain. He sends his underlings to the wheat pit to buy and sell. He dismisses the pleas of a "ruined man" devastated by his business manipulation.

As a result, the common folk have to pay double for bread, ten cents a loaf instead of five, or go without. A group of angry men have to be driven back from a baker at gunpoint by policemen.

The wheat king celebrates his triumph with a dinner party. He later takes his family and friends on a tour of the grain elevators. However, unseen by anyone, he falls into an elevator and is buried by the grain being poured in. He is finally fished out, but too late (see still photograph above).

In the final scene, the same farmer as at the beginning sows his field, though now he is alone.

== Cast ==
A Corner in Wheat (1909)

- Frank Powell as The wheat king
- James Kirkwood as The poor farmer
- Linda Arvidson as The poor farmer's wife
- Gladys Egan as The poor farmer's daughter
- Henry B. Walthall as The wheat king's assistant
- Grace Henderson as The wheat king's wife
- W. Chrystie Miller as The poor farmer's father

== Release ==
The film was released on December 13, 1909. Because of an upsurge in political populism, audiences reacted to the film positively. Before A Corner in Wheat, Griffith avoided making political statements in his work. After the film's success, he began to make bolder statements about society and politics, such as famously championing white supremacy in The Birth of a Nation (1915).

== Analysis and impact ==
Griffith normally used intercutting (cross-cutting) to depict "converging lines of action"; here, however, the three narrative threads—the farmers, the wheat king, and the poor affected by his actions—never interact with each other. Vlada Petrić states that this "anticipates Eisenstein's intellectual montage."

== See also ==
- D. W. Griffith filmography
- Blanche Sweet filmography
