= Palisades Tahoe Aerial Tram =

Tram in Olympic Valley, California

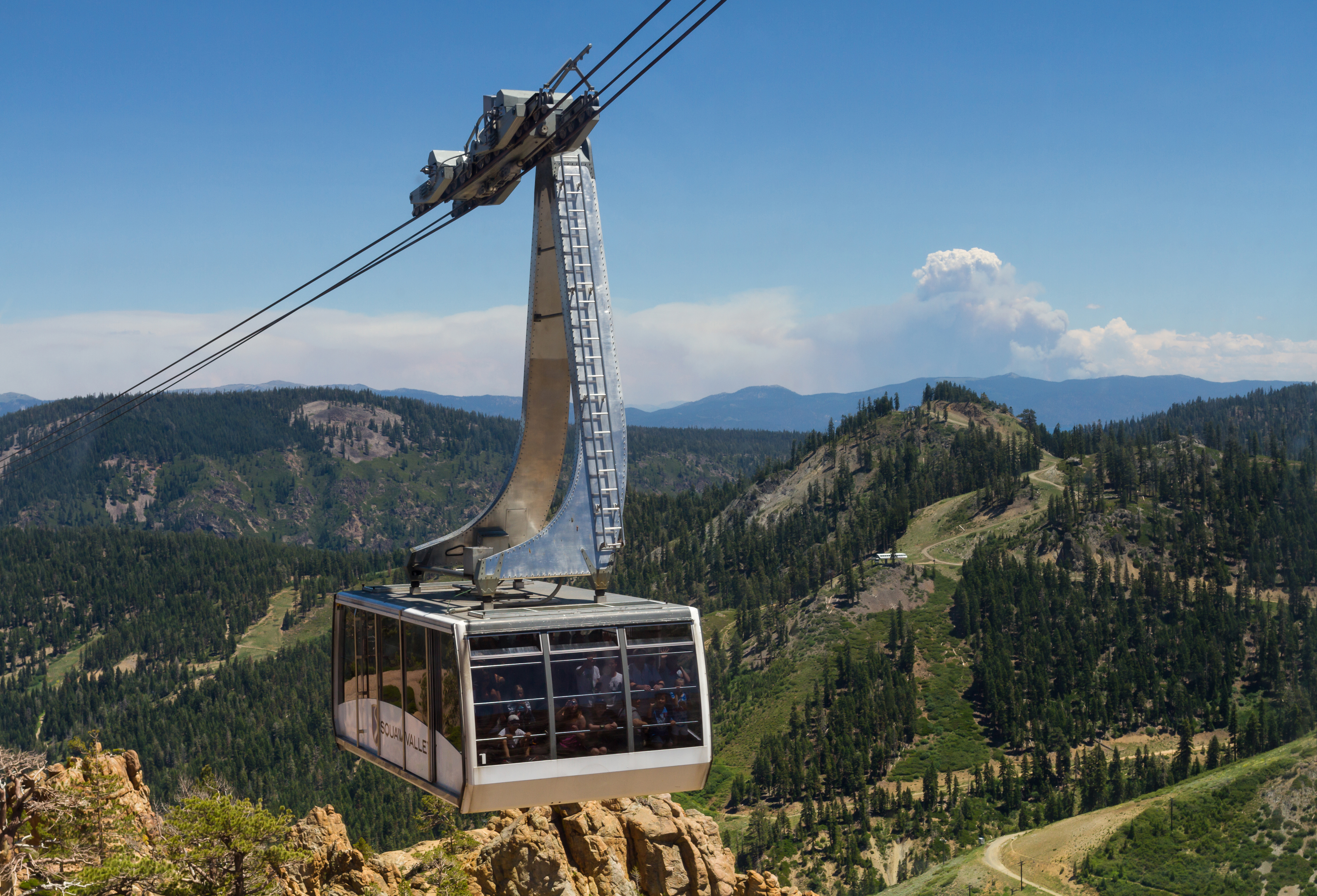
The tram in summer

The Palisades Tahoe Aerial Tram (originally called the Squaw Valley Aerial Tramway) is a 1.5-mile (2.4 km) long aerial tramway at the Palisades Tahoe ski resort in Olympic Valley, California. It was inaugurated in 1968, and was called the Cable Car. At its opening, it was the largest tramway in the world, built by the Swiss company Garaventa. It carries passengers from the Base Camp at 6,200 feet (1,889m) elevation to High Camp at 8,200 feet (2,499m) elevation. The tram operates year-round.

Aerial Tram operations are subject to change based on weather and conditions. Check the real-time operating status on the Palisades Tahoe website.

== 1978 disaster ==
During a blizzard in 1978 a tram car carrying 44 passengers became dislodged from one of the two cables. It fell 75 feet (23 m) before the second cable halted its fall, causing the car to bounce back up.

The cable that had become disconnected sprung upwards and broke its connection to the tower. The 17-ton cable fell downwards slicing into the rebounding car, instantly killing three passengers. The final casualties were 4 killed and 22 injured.

== See also ==
- Funitel
- Palisades Tahoe
- VIII Olympic Winter Games
- California Historical Landmarks in Placer County
