= Sugar Pine Dam =

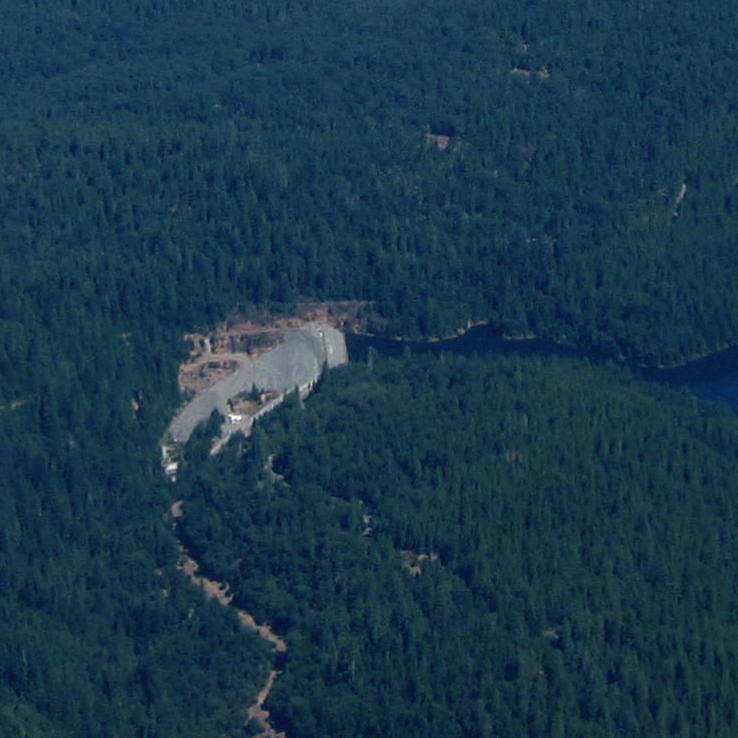
- Sugar Pine Dam from the air
- Country: United States
- Location: Northern California
- Coordinates: 39°7′47″N 120°48′5″W
- Construction began: 1979; 46 years ago
- Opening date: 1982; 43 years ago
- Construction cost: $71 million
- Owner(s): Foresthill Public Utility District
- Operator(s): Foresthill Public Utility District

Dam and spillways
- Type of dam: Earth fill dam
- Impounds: North Shirttail Creek
- Height: 205 ft (62 m)
- Length: 689 ft (210 m)
- Width (base): 984 ft (300 m)
- Dam volume: 987,500 cu ft (27,960 m^{3})

Reservoir
- Creates: Sugar Pine Reservoir
- Total capacity: 6,921 acre⋅ft (8,537,000 m^{3})
- Surface area: 165 acres (67 ha)
- Normal elevation: 3,609 ft (1,100 m)

Sugar Pine Dam is an earthfill embankment dam in Placer County, California, approximately 7 miles (11 km) north of Foresthill. It impounds North Shirttail Creek, a tributary of the North Fork American River, and serves as the primary municipal water supply for the Foresthill community.

== History ==
The dam was authorized in 1965 as part of the Auburn-Folsom South Unit of the Central Valley Project. Construction began in 1979, and the dam was completed in 1982. The project was transferred to the Foresthill Public Utility District for operation and maintenance in 1984. Although Sugar Pine Dam was funded through the Central Valley Project, it was never integrated into the project operationally, as it was intended to work with the never-completed Auburn Dam. The Sugar Pine Pipeline carries water from Sugar Pine Reservoir to the Foresthill area.

In 2003, the Foresthill Public Utility District purchased Sugar Pine Dam, reservoir, and the pipeline from the U.S. Bureau of Reclamation for $3.1 million. As of 2012, the district provides water to 1,875 homes and 75 businesses in and around Foresthill.

== See also ==
- List of dams and reservoirs in California
