= Iowa Hill, California =

Unincorporated community in California, United States

Iowa Hill
- Unincorporated community
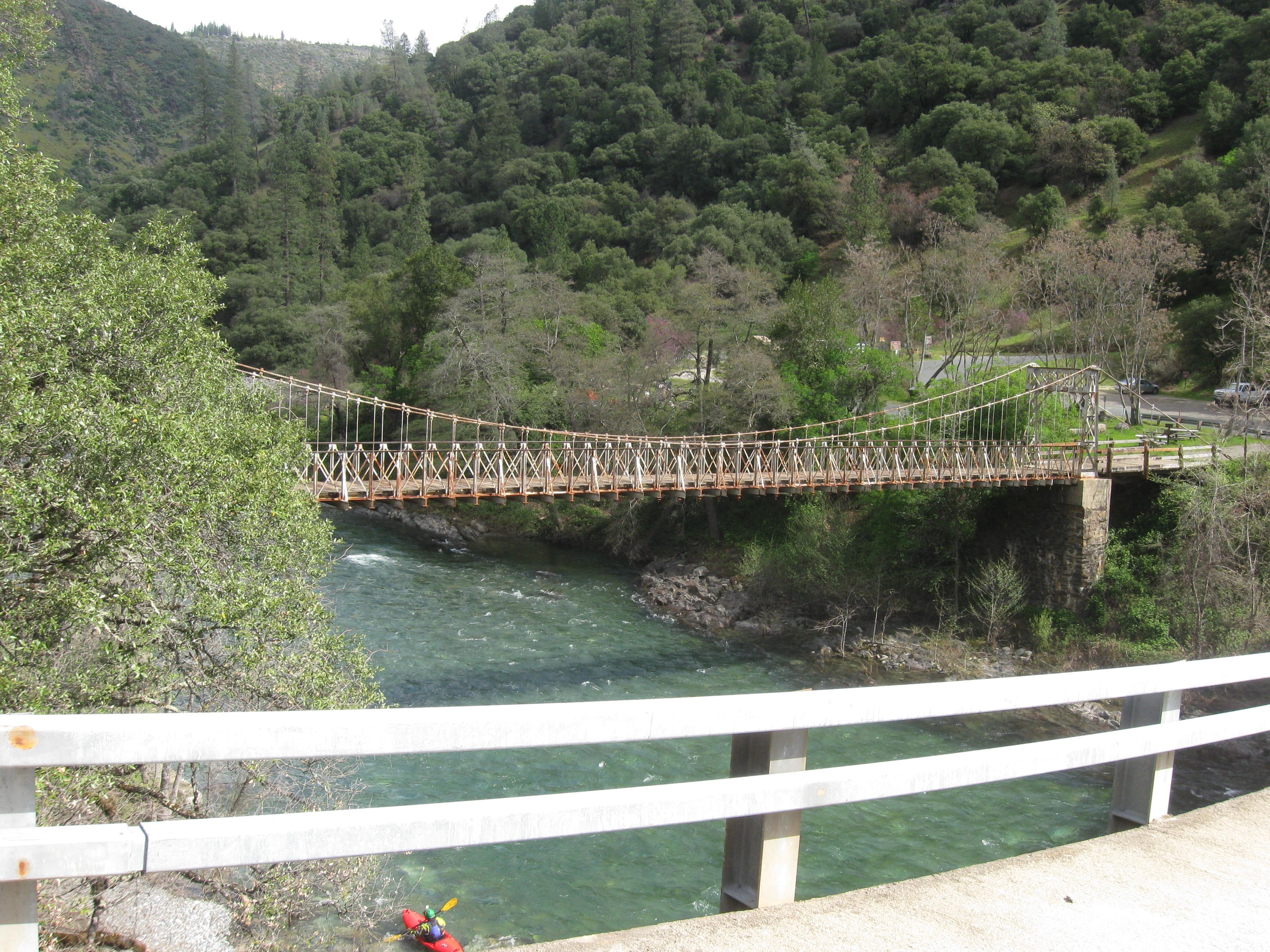
- Iowa Hill bridges over the North Fork of the American River

- Location in California Iowa Hill (the United States)
- Coordinates: 39°06′31″N 120°51′34″W
- Country: United States
- State: California
- County: Placer
- Elevation: 2,861 ft (872 m)

California Historical Landmark
- Reference no.: 401

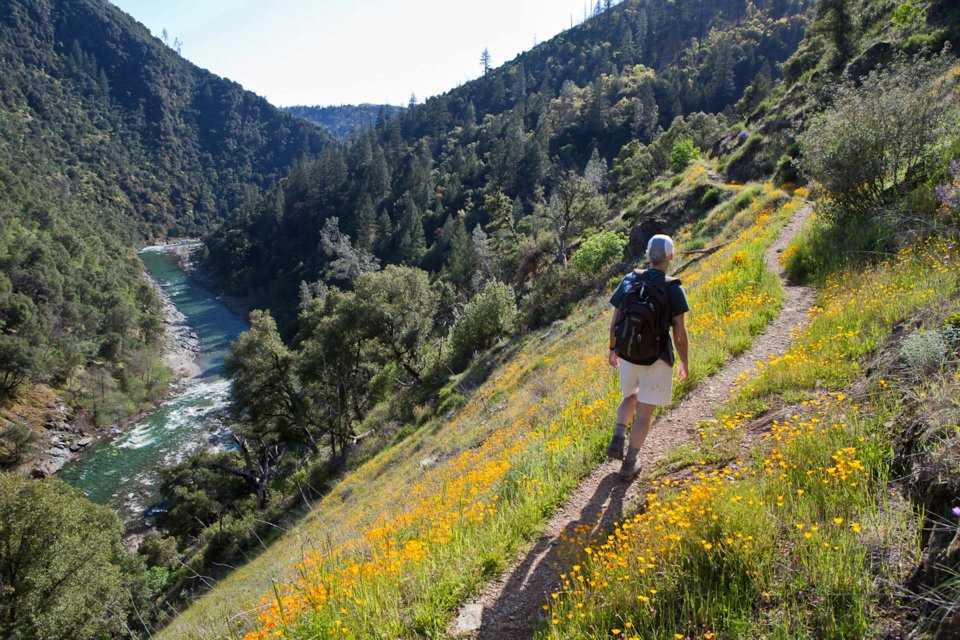
The Historic Stevens Trail connected the town of Iowa Hill with the city of Colfax, California. It is now a popular hiking trail, extending 4.5 miles along the North Fork of the American River.

Iowa Hill (formerly, Iowa City) is an unincorporated community in Placer County, California, United States. The town is located 6.5 miles northwest of Foresthill, 9 miles east of Colfax, and 58 miles northeast of Sacramento. It lies at an elevation of 2,861 feet. The community relies completely upon solar panels and generators for power. Its population is around 50 people.

Iowa Hill Road claims a small handful of lives every decade, and the community's "off-grid" status prevents the town from growing in population. The community boasts many hardcore cyclists and is appealing to visitors due to the abundance of recreational opportunities. Iowa Hill Road is a steep, one-lane, winding road. There are no safety guardrails. Since ambulance service from Colfax takes a long time, emergency medical transport is supplemented by CALSTAR, the area's air rescue helicopter. A landing pad is located next to the town firehouse.

== Culture ==
Locals are regularly spotted out and about the town and North Fork of the American River. Popular activities are hiking, cycling, swimming, whitewater rafting, kayaking, gold panning/mining, and fishing. About 50% of the town's homes are vacation homes. The community relies solely on solar panels and generators since Iowa Hill is not connected to the electrical grid. Mail service is three times per week. The Iowa Hill Store is a restaurant, bar, post office, and ultra mini-market.

== Tourism ==
Iowa Hill enjoys a small but significant cult following of outdoor enthusiasts. Within five miles of town is the North Fork of the American River and the Mineral Bar Campground, Sugar Pine Reservoir recreation area, and numerous trails including the famous Stevens Trail between Colfax and Iowa Hill. The Mineral Bar Campground is part of the Auburn State Recreation Area, a State Park managed by the Bureau of Reclamation, which began charging for parking in 2013. Stevens Trailhead remains free to park. It begins adjacent to the Iowa Hill Store going to Colfax, and crossing the North Fork in between.

== History ==
In 1851 or 1852, miners from Iowa discovered gold here. The Iowa City post office opened in 1854. Stores, breweries, saloons, fraternal lodges, homes, a church, a school, and Temperance Hall are examples of businesses thriving in Iowa Hill in the mid-1850s. In 1857, a fire destroyed about one hundred buildings in the central business district of the town, but no fatalities were recorded. The town was producing about one hundred thousand dollars per week in gold in 1867. In 1901, the post office changed its name to Iowa Hill. In 1920 a fire took hold that virtually destroyed the town. What remains is an old Wells Fargo vault, the old firehouse, a couple of other old buildings, and two cemeteries. Iowa Hill is now registered as California Historical Landmark #401.

== Telephone service ==
In 1955, the first dial telephone service was installed running between Iowa Hill and Colfax, California, it was one line put in by local residents led by Robert F. Yonash. The single landline was in operation for over ten years, but eventually became nonoperational due to the lack of maintenance. The long line was suspended from the town of Colfax over the American River Canyon where it would occasionally snap apart.

The community did not have landline telephone service again until 2011, relying instead on radio communications and spotty mobile/cell phones. In October 2011, landline service again became available, paid for in part by a grant from the California Public Utilities Commission. This service uses microwave towers to the Foresthill Telephone Company in Foresthill, California.

== Mining ==
There are dozens of famous gold mines in the area, including "Big Dipper" and "Gleeson"

Frank Norris wrote a short story in 1903 titled The Wife of Chino about local miners who went into town to use the Iowa Hill Post Office.

== Climate ==
This region experiences significant variation in weather. Winter generally produces as much as 1–2 feet of snow with temperatures as low as 15 degrees. Summers vary between 87-104 degrees. According to the Köppen Climate Classification system, Iowa Hill has a hot summer Mediterranean climate, abbreviated "Csa" on climate maps.

Climate data for Iowa Hill (1893-2007)
Month	Jan	Feb	Mar	Apr	May	Jun	Jul	Aug	Sep	Oct	Nov	Dec	Year
Record high °F (°C)	72 (22)	77 (25)	79 (26)	88 (31)	98 (37)	95 (35)	104 (40)	107 (42)	98 (37)	90 (32)	82 (28)	74 (23)	107 (42)
Mean daily maximum °F (°C)	50 (10)	52.6 (11.4)	56.8 (13.8)	64.5 (18.1)	70.2 (21.2)	77.1 (25.1)	86.9 (30.5)	87.1 (30.6)	81 (27)	69.5 (20.8)	59.1 (15.1)	52.6 (11.4)	67.3 (19.6)
Mean daily minimum °F (°C)	35.7 (2.1)	37.1 (2.8)	38.1 (3.4)	42.4 (5.8)	46.9 (8.3)	52 (11)	60.5 (15.8)	60.3 (15.7)	55.7 (13.2)	48.1 (8.9)	41.6 (5.3)	37.2 (2.9)	46.3 (7.9)
Record low °F (°C)	16 (−9)	18 (−8)	20 (−7)	23 (−5)	32 (0)	34 (1)	44 (7)	46 (8)	40 (4)	30 (−1)	28 (−2)	21 (−6)	16 (−9)
Average precipitation inches (mm)	10.14 (258)	8.34 (212)	7.86 (200)	4.12 (105)	2.39 (61)	0.74 (19)	0.1 (2.5)	0.18 (4.6)	0.87 (22)	2.64 (67)	6.72 (171)	8.83 (224)	52.93 (1,344)
Average snowfall inches (cm)	9.8 (25)	6.6 (17)	6.8 (17)	2.8 (7.1)	0.2 (0.51)	0 (0)	0 (0)	0 (0)	0 (0)	0 (0)	0.6 (1.5)	3.6 (9.1)	30.6 (78)
Average precipitation days	11	10	11	8	5	2	0	1	2	4	8	10	72
Source: WRCC
