= Dutch Flat, California =

- census-designated place
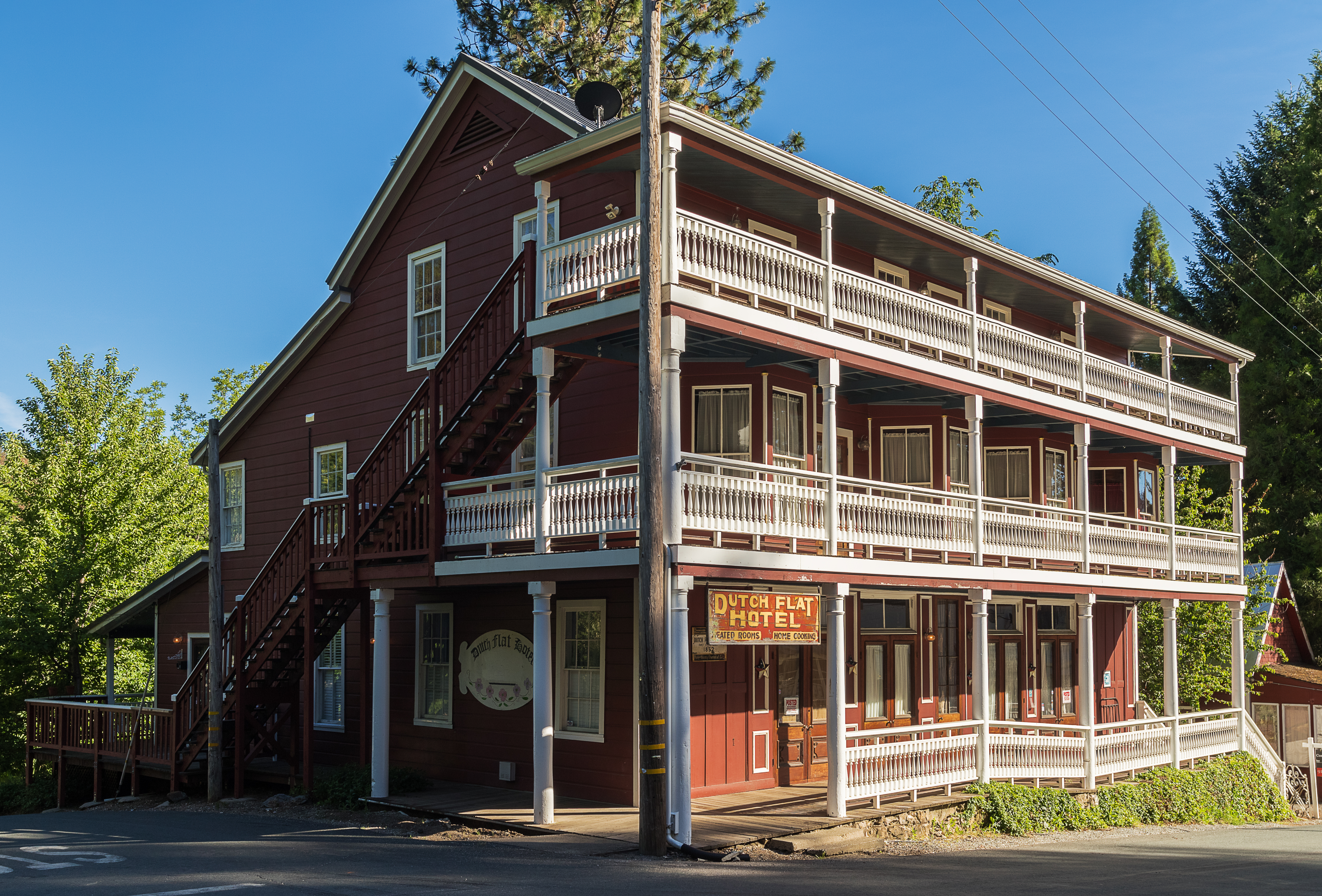
- Dutch Flat Hotel, built in 1852 when Dutch Flat was one of the largest hydraulic gold mining towns in California

- Location of Dutch Flat in Placer County, California.

- Location within the United States
- Coordinates: 39°12′29″N 120°50′04″W
- Country: United States
- State: California
- County: Placer

Area
  - Total: 0.59 sq mi (1.53 km^{2})
  - Land: 0.59 sq mi (1.53 km^{2})
  - Water: 0 sq mi (0.00 km^{2}) 0%
- Elevation: 3,265 ft (995 m)

Population (2020)
  - Total: 183
  - Density: 308.8/sq mi (119.23/km^{2})
- Time zone: UTC-8 (Pacific (PST))
  - Summer (DST): UTC-7 (PDT)
- ZIP code: 95714
- Area codes: 530, 837
- FIPS code: 06-20298
- GNIS feature ID: 2628726

Dutch Flat (also, Dutchman's Flat, Dutch Charlie's Flat, and Charley's Flat) is a small unincorporated community and census-designated place (CDP) in Placer County, California, United States, about 30 miles (48 km) northeast of Auburn along Interstate 80. It was founded by German immigrants in 1851 and was once one of the richest gold mining locations in California. Dutch Flat is now registered as a California Historical Landmark. As of the 2020 census, Dutch Flat had a population of 183.

The community's ZIP code is 95714 and its area code 530.

== History ==
Dutch Flat was founded by two German brothers, Joseph and Charles Dornbach, who settled there in 1851 during the California Gold Rush.

To the south of their settlement was the busy mining camp of Green Valley, where 2,000 men were at work when the Dornbachs arrived. Across the Bear River in Nevada County was another camp, Little York, and just west, a trading post at Cold Springs (later known as Gold Run). All these camps were supplied by mule train from Illinoistown, near today's Colfax. Mule drivers referred to the Dornbachs' camp as 'Dutch Charlie's Flat,' and thus the town was named. During this period many Germans were referred as 'Dutch' as a shorthand for Deutschland. In the 1870s an attempt was made to change the name to 'German Level'.

The Dutch Flat post office opened in 1856.

=== Stagecoach stop ===
While Dutch Flat was originally settled by miners, it first gained prominence as an important stagecoach stop, making it one of the largest and most important towns in Placer County from about 1864 to 1866. In the fall of 1866, however, the railroad had reached Cisco, 20 miles (32 km) further up the ridge, and Dutch Flat lost most of its importance as a stage stop.

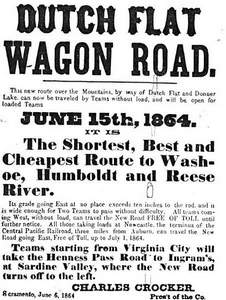
Advertisement for Dutch Flat Wagon Road, 1864.

In 1859 Dr. Daniel Strong of Dutch Flat invited railroad surveyor (later, chief engineer of the Central Pacific Railroad) Theodore Judah to come and evaluate a possible route across the Sierra Nevada mountains. One of the first large mining ditches to reach Dutch Flat had, in effect, demonstrated the existence of easy grades up to Emigrant Gap; from there, the line of the old Donner Trail across the Sierra Nevada was also such that a railroad could be built. Judah argued vociferously for the Central Pacific's financial backers—including California's "Big Four": Leland Stanford, Collis P. Huntington, Mark Hopkins, and Charles Crocker—to employ the route for a trans-Sierra route that would link up to existing Union Pacific service in Utah or Nevada, instead of Huntington's less-ambitious plan to cater to the lucrative stage and wagon-hauled freight between Sacramento and the Comstock mining boom by building a well-surfaced toll road from Dutch Flat to Donner Lake, and then onward to the Carson Valley in Nevada.

Judah may have been the most vocal critic of the Dutch Flat–Donner Pass Wagon Road, but he wasn't the only opponent. San Francisco investors, Sierra miners, and even the general public believed that the Central Pacific Railroad was focused only on getting their line built to Dutch Flat. Other Californians believed the whole railroad construction project a scam and that no one, not even "Crazy Judah", had ever really figured out a practicable route through the Sierra range.

The perception of greed and avarice raised the ire of many. San Francisco newspapers boldly accused the Central Pacific of planning only to lay track up to Dutch Flat and no further. Numerous articles and pamphlets arguing against the "Great Dutch Flat Swindle!" flooded the press. San Francisco's Alta California editorialized, "The Sacramentans Big Four are determined to have no railroad but Dutch Flat. The Capital City has aided in the raid upon this county for $80,000, upon Placer County for $25,000, and upon the state for millions. There will never be a railroad via Dutch Flat to Nevada Territory. There are obstacles which cannot be overcome. The Pacific Railroad will follow another route, not through Sacramento or anywhere else in the vicinity."

Despite the intense backlash, there was never any foundation to the stories spread by detractors of the Central Pacific Railroad. Judah's successor as chief engineer, Samuel S. Montague, was immediately ordered to continue surveying the future route as far as the "Big Bend of the Truckee River" (where it turns north toward Pyramid Lake), more than 40 miles (64 km) east of the California border. Obviously, there was no doubt among the Big Four that the Central Pacific line would eventually connect with the Union Pacific somewhere in Utah or the Nevada territory.

=== Mining ===
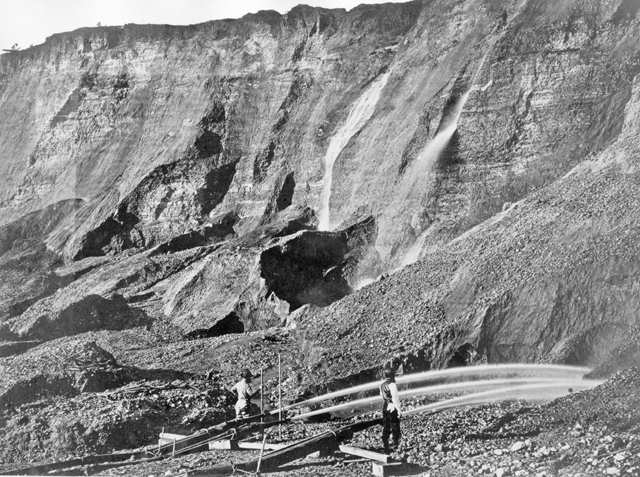
Gold miners excavate an eroded bluff with jets of water at a placer mine in Dutch Flat, California sometime between 1857 and 1870.

Mining operations at Dutch Flat reached their peak during the 1870s, with thousands of miners working the surrounding area. Prior to the 1870s, gold mining was often a solitary and small-scale pursuit. In 1872, however, the Cedar Creek Company of London purchased over 30 claims in the area and began working them in a more aggressive and industrial fashion, employing hydraulic mining to reach hitherto unreachable deposits of gold by literally blasting it out of alluvial deposits with high-pressure water cannons known as "monitors". The many dozens of mining claims dividing the old channel gravels beside Dutch Flat and Gold Run made for a thriving economy. In January 1884, however, in a historic verdict, a United States District Court banned the flushing of debris into streams. Implementing the decision was difficult, as many miners refused to accept the court decision. Court challenges were filed, injunctions were disobeyed, inspectors were threatened with violence, but eventually hydraulic operations were brought to an end.

=== Lumber ===
Lumber was a prominent industry in Dutch Flat's history. From 1861 to 1907, the Towle Brothers Lumber Company was among the largest in the state, owning over 20,000 acres (81 km^{2}) of land, with a private narrow-gauge railroad 38 miles (61 km) long, and employing a workforce of around 200 men, including fifty Chinese workers.

=== Chinatown ===
Dutch Flat's Chinatown began in the 1850s, and by the late 1860s, when the transcontinental railroad was under construction, it was one of the largest Chinese settlements outside of San Francisco. In 1853, Dutch Flat had a population of 6,000 including 3,500 Chinese. In 1877 Old Chinatown burned down, and the settlement relocated south of town, near the Dutch Flat Depot on the Central Pacific Railroad. Adjoining the pioneer American cemetery just above the town is the Chinese burial grounds.

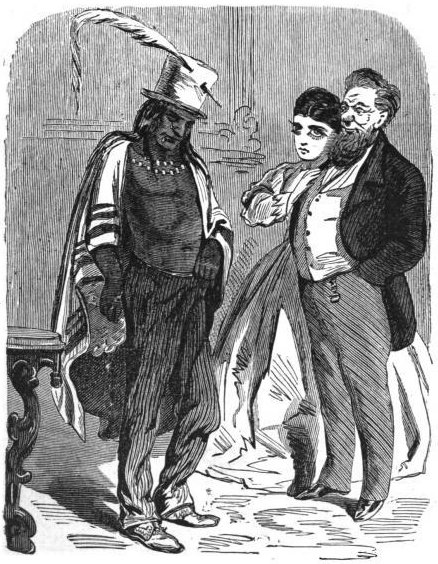
"Muck-a-Muck, the haughty, untaught, untrammeled son of the forest (after Cooper)." Illustration for Bret Harte's Condensed Novels (first edition).

=== Culture ===
In the 19th century, Dutch Flat was referred to by residents as "the Athens of the Foothills". It had a thriving amateur dramatical society and debating society, and Mark Twain lectured at its Opera House. Dutch Flat was also frequently mentioned in works by Bret Harte, including "Muck-A-Muck: A Modern Indian Novel After Cooper".

== Present ==
As of October 2009, Dutch Flat had 333 residents. The town is designated "semi-ghost" and while tourism makes up much of the local economy, many of its current residents are retirees, families and professionals who commute to nearby jobs.

== Geography ==
According to the United States Census Bureau, the CDP covers an area of 0.6 square miles (1.5 km^{2}), all of it land.

== Climate ==
Dutch Flat has a hot-summer Mediterranean climate (Köppen climate classification Csa) that is characterized by cool, wet winters and hot, dry summers. (Köppen climate classification Csa)

Climate data for Dutch Flat, California
Month	Jan	Feb	Mar	Apr	May	Jun	Jul	Aug	Sep	Oct	Nov	Dec	Year
Record high °F (°C)	77 (25)	80 (27)	85 (29)	91 (33)	102 (39)	111 (44)	113 (45)	112 (44)	106 (41)	101 (38)	87 (31)	75 (24)	113 (45)
Mean daily maximum °F (°C)	53 (12)	60 (16)	64 (18)	70 (21)	80 (27)	89 (32)	94 (34)	92 (33)	87 (31)	77 (25)	62 (17)	53 (12)	73 (23)
Daily mean °F (°C)	46 (8)	51 (11)	54 (12)	59 (15)	67 (19)	74 (23)	79 (26)	77 (25)	73 (23)	64 (18)	53 (12)	46 (8)	62 (17)
Mean daily minimum °F (°C)	38 (3)	42 (6)	44 (7)	47 (8)	53 (12)	60 (16)	63 (17)	62 (17)	58 (14)	51 (11)	44 (7)	39 (4)	50 (10)
Record low °F (°C)	22 (−6)	21 (−6)	26 (−3)	34 (1)	37 (3)	46 (8)	50 (10)	49 (9)	42 (6)	35 (2)	27 (−3)	20 (−7)	20 (−7)
Average precipitation inches (mm)	4.10 (104)	3.35 (85)	3.21 (82)	1.70 (43)	0.50 (13)	0.21 (5.3)	0.07 (1.8)	0.10 (2.5)	0.46 (12)	1.37 (35)	3.93 (100)	3.03 (77)	1.83 (46)
Source: http://www.myforecast.com/bin/climate.m?city=515299&metric=false

== Demographics ==
Historical population
Census	Pop.	Note	%±
2010	160		—
2020	183		14.4%
U.S. Decennial Census; 1850–1870 1880-1890; 1900 1910 1920; 1930 1940 1950; 1960 1970 1980; 1990 2000 2010

Dutch Flat first appeared as a census designated place in the 2010 U.S. census.

The 2020 United States census reported that Dutch Flat had a population of 183. The population density was 308.6 inhabitants per square mile (119.2/km^{2}). The racial makeup of Dutch Flat was 159 (86.9%) White, 1 (0.5%) African American, 2 (1.1%) Native American, 0 (0.0%) Asian, 1 (0.5%) Pacific Islander, 2 (1.1%) from other races, and 18 (9.8%) from two or more races. Hispanic or Latino of any race were 21 persons (11.5%).

The whole population lived in households. There were 86 households, out of which 10 (11.6%) had children under the age of 18 living in them, 36 (41.9%) were married-couple households, 13 (15.1%) were cohabiting couple households, 18 (20.9%) had a female householder with no partner present, and 19 (22.1%) had a male householder with no partner present. 23 households (26.7%) were one person, and 13 (15.1%) were one person aged 65 or older. The average household size was 2.13. There were 48 families (55.8% of all households).

The age distribution was 28 people (15.3%) under the age of 18, 16 people (8.7%) aged 18 to 24, 36 people (19.7%) aged 25 to 44, 42 people (23.0%) aged 45 to 64, and 61 people (33.3%) who were 65 years of age or older. The median age was 54.2 years. There were 97 males and 86 females.

There were 127 housing units at an average density of 214.2 units per square mile (82.7 units/km^{2}), of which 86 (67.7%) were occupied. Of these, 58 (67.4%) were owner-occupied, and 28 (32.6%) were occupied by renters.

== Tourism ==
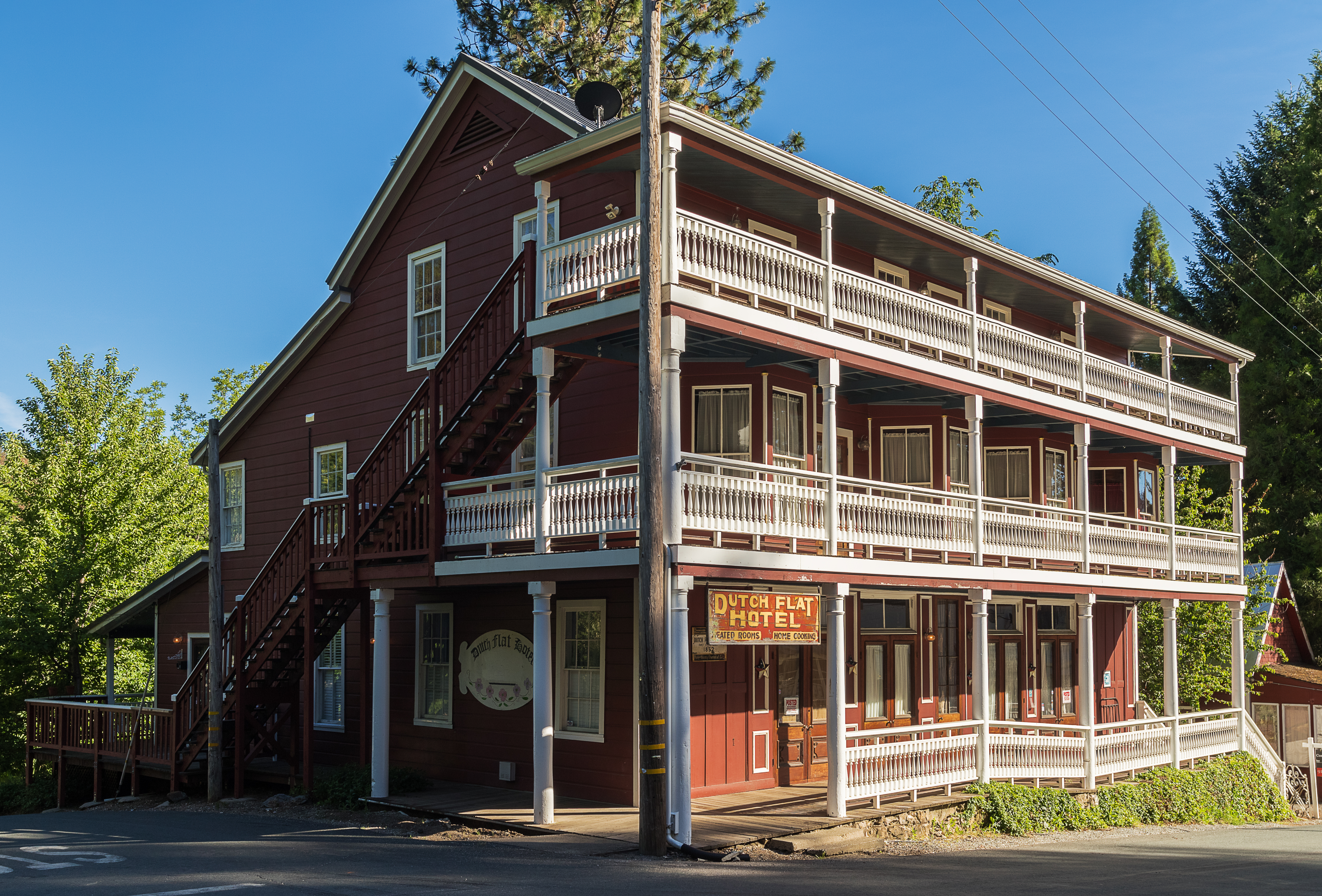
Dutch Flat Hotel, built in 1852 when Dutch Flat was one of the largest hydraulic gold mining towns in California

Recently, residents of Dutch Flat have sought to increase tourism by asking the state Department of Transportation for a sign on I-80 saying Dutch Flat is a national historic landmark. The Golden Drift Museum on Main Street is open in summer. Historic buildings of note include the Dutch Flat Hotel (1853), Methodist Church (1861), old Dutch Flat Elementary School (1898), Odd Fellows Building and the Masonic Hall (both pre-1856), and the Dutch Flat Cemetery. Dutch Flat is near all mountain recreation areas and only a short distance from snow and water skiing, fishing, biking, kayaking, gold panning and hiking the abundant mountain trails. The town hosts a parade on the 4th of July.

== Literature ==
Dutch Flat has been mentioned or used as a setting by the following authors:

- Mark Twain, who derided Dutch Flat poetry as "smooth and blubbery" in a small piece for the 1864 Californian. He also noted Dutch Flat as the death place of "George," the subject of his essay "General Washington's Negro Body Servant: A Biographical Sketch."
- Bret Harte used Dutch Flat as a location for "Muck-A-Muck: A Modern Indian Novel After Cooper" and for "Wan Lee the Pagan."
