= Virginiatown, California =

Unincorporated community in California, United States

Virginiatown
- Unincorporated community
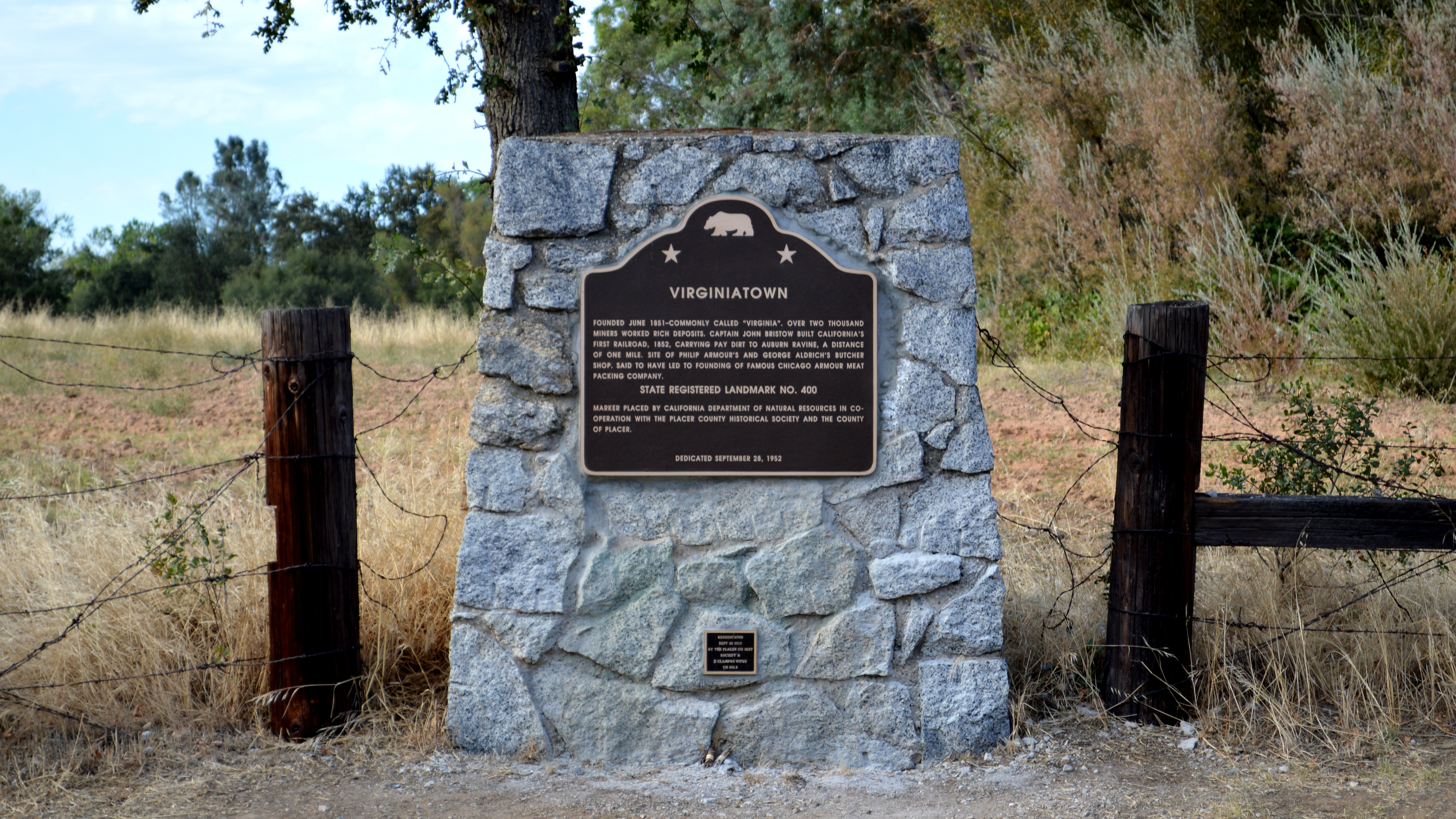
- Plaque in Virginiatown

- Location in California Virginiatown (the United States)
- Coordinates: 38°54′02″N 121°12′53″W
- Country: United States
- State: California
- County: Placer County
- Elevation: 322 ft (98 m)

California Historical Landmark
- Reference no.: 400

Virginiatown (formerly, Virginia) is a former settlement in Placer County, California. Virginiatown is located on Auburn Ravine, 7.5 miles (12.1 km) west of Auburn.

Virginiatown is California Historical Landmark #400. The town was the site of one of California's first railroads, built in 1852 to carry gold ore from the mines to Auburn Ravine. After the first wave of gold mining ended, wood-cutting became an important local industry, to support railroad construction and to fuel the kiln at the pottery mill in nearby Lincoln. A large number of Chinese miners moved into the area around this time and reworked the diggings; the white residents voted to expel the Chinese from town in 1860, claiming a "fire hazard", and the Chinese resettled just west of town. A Chinese temple stood outside Virginiatown as late as 1907, and two rammed-earth Chinese houses were still standing as of 1957.

The site of Virginiatown is now occupied by rural homes and small farms.
