= Sugar Pine Reservoir =

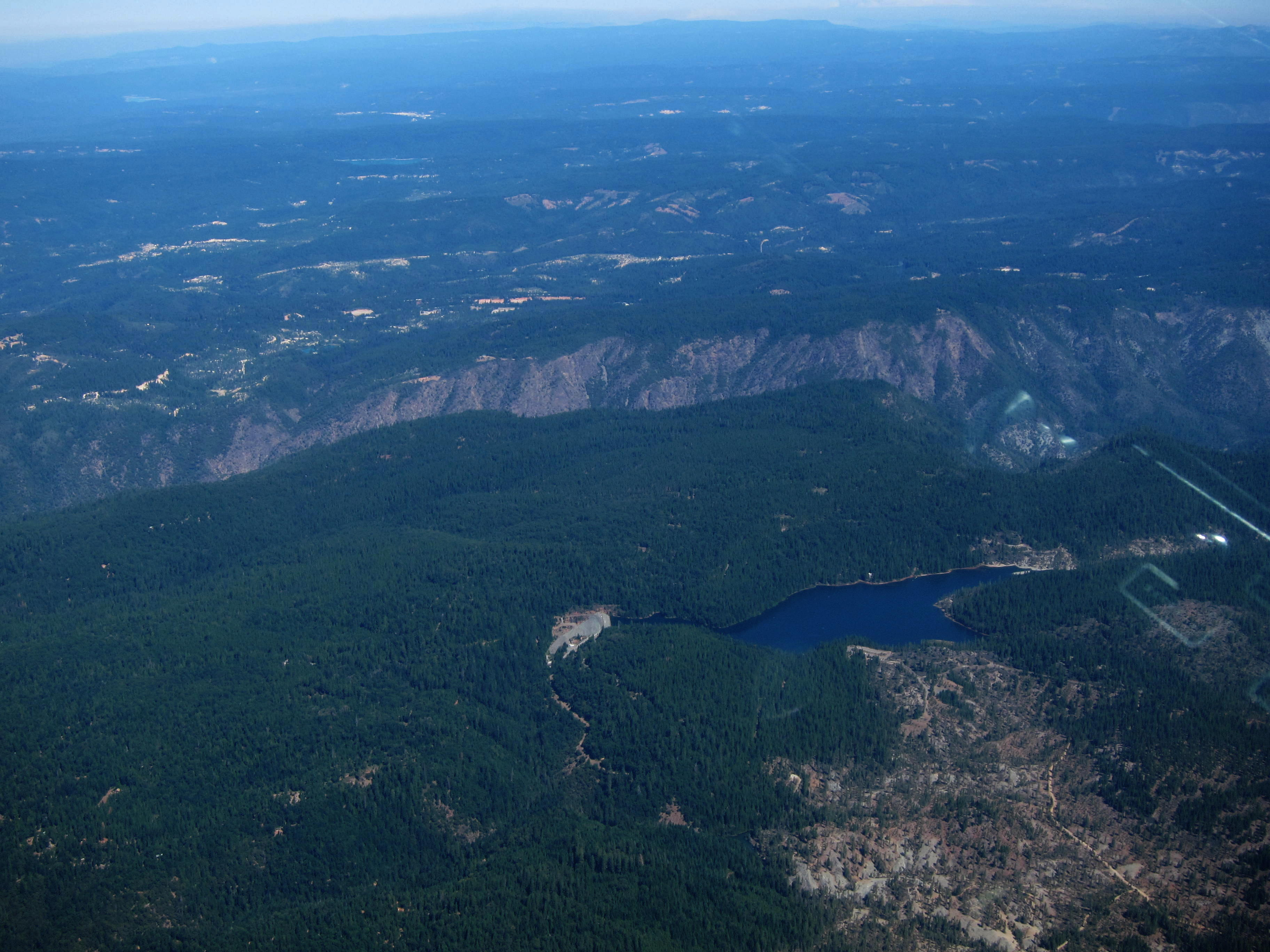
- Sugar Pine Reservoir from the air

- Location within California Location within the United States
- Location: Northern California
- Coordinates: 39°08′02″N 120°47′32″W
- Type: Reservoir
- Primary inflows: North Shirttail Creek
- Primary outflows: North Shirttail Creek
- Basin countries: United States
- Built: 1979
- First flooded: 1982
- Surface area: 165 acres (67 ha)
- Water volume: 6,921 acre⋅ft (8,537,000 m^{3})
- Surface elevation: 3,609 ft (1,100 m)

Sugar Pine Reservoir is a reservoir in Placer County, California, located approximately 7 miles (11 km) north of Foresthill. The reservoir was flooded in 1982, and today supplies water to the community of Foresthill and hosts a number of recreation facilities.

== History ==
The reservoir was created in 1982 with the construction of Sugar Pine Dam over North Shirttail Creek, a tributary of the North Fork American River, as part of the Auburn-Folsom South Unit of the Central Valley Project. Although Sugar Pine Dam was funded through the Central Valley Project, it was never integrated into the project operationally, as it was intended to work with the never-completed Auburn Dam. According to the U.S. Bureau of Reclamation (USBR), during the 1987–1992 California drought the reservoir performed well, filling and spilling and meeting its water obligations each year but one.

In 2003, the community of Foresthill purchased Sugar Pine Reservoir, Sugar Pine Dam, and its conveyance system from the USBR for $3.1 million. As of 2012, the Foresthill Public Utility District provides water to 1,875 homes and 75 businesses in and around Foresthill.

== Recreation ==
Outdoor journalist Tom Stienstra called the reservoir a "small emerald jewel ringed by forest" and described the trout fishing as "decent".

Recreation at Sugar Pine Reservoir is managed by the Tahoe National Forest under an agreement with the USBR. The reservoir offers four main recreation areas around the lake. The complex, which opened in May 1985, contains two campgrounds, boat ramp, hiking trails, picnic area, swimming beach, and a trailer dump station. The facilities are operated under a concession agreement between the U.S. Forest Service and L&L Inc.

== See also ==
- List of lakes in California
- List of dams and reservoirs in California
