= Yankee Jims, California =

Unincorporated community in California, United States

Yankee Jims
- Unincorporated community
- Location in California Yankee Jims (the United States)
- Coordinates: 39°01′46″N 120°51′42″W
- Country: United States
- State: California
- County: Placer County
- Established: 1852
- Elevation: 2,582 ft (787 m)

Population (2016)
  - Total: 18

California Historical Landmark
- Reference no.: 398

Yankee Jims (also, Yankee Jim and Yankee Jim's) is a small community in Placer County, California.

It lies at an elevation of 2582 feet (787 m) in the Sierra Nevada foothills. Yankee Jims is located 2.5 miles (4.0 km) west-northwest of Foresthill.

== History ==
Yankee Jims was once one of the largest mining camps in Placer County during the California Gold Rush. The Yankee Jim's post office operated from 1852 to 1940. The name comes from an Australian criminal who hid stolen horses at the site before gold was discovered there.

The town site is marked by California Historical Landmark #398, located on a ridge between the North and Middle forks of the American River.

Yankee Jims today is a small town composed simply of a cluster of homes. Its population was 18 in 2016.

== See also ==
- California Historical Landmarks in Placer County, California
- Mining communities of the California Gold Rush
