= Gold Run, California =

Gold Run Mountain Springs
- Former settlement
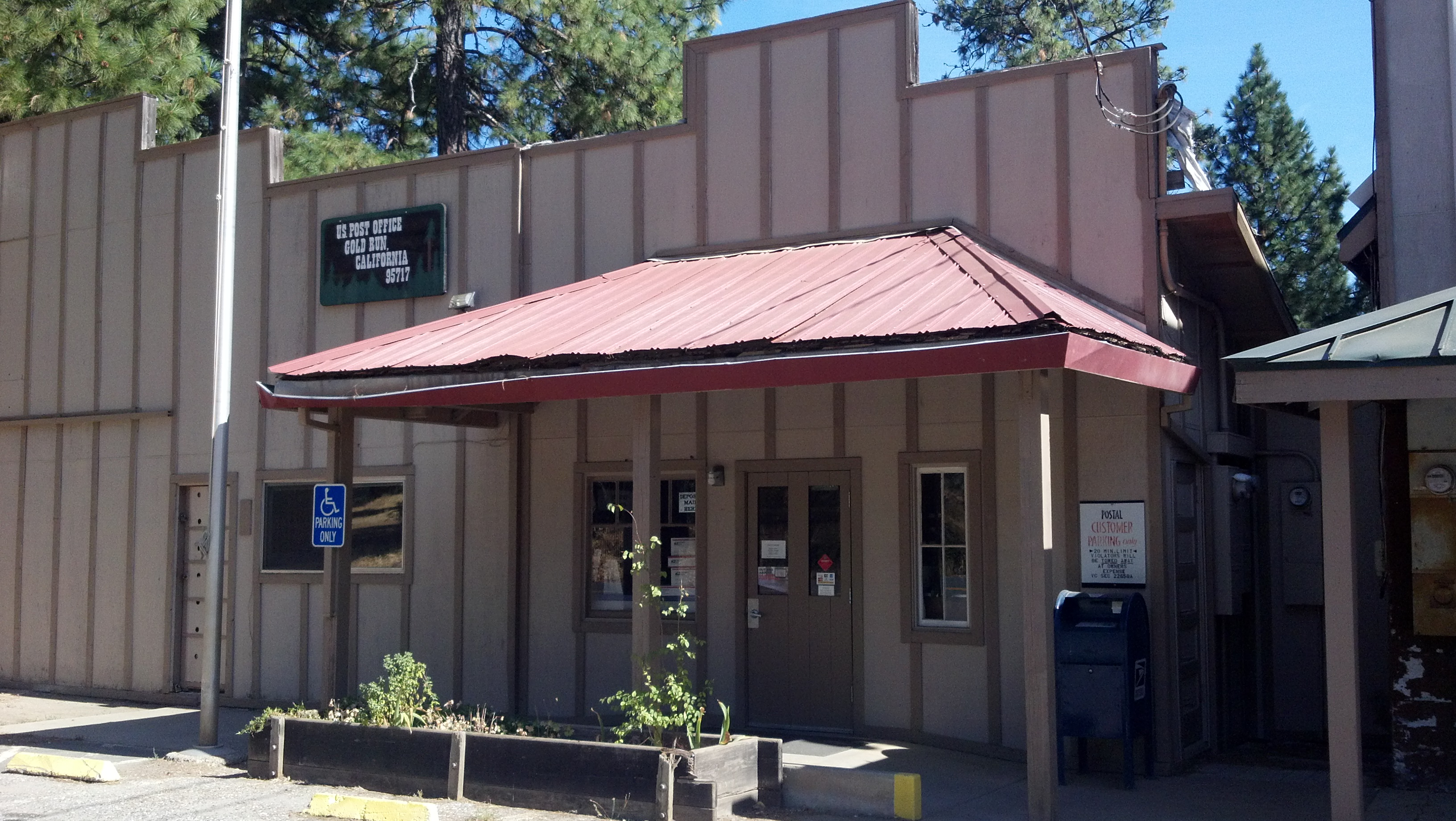
- Building of former gold rush mining town

- Location in California Gold Run (the United States)
- Coordinates: 39°10′51″N 120°51′21″W
- Country: United States
- State: California
- County: Placer
- Established: 1854
- Elevation: 3,212 ft (979 m)
- ZIP code: 95717
- Area codes: 530, 837

California Historical Landmark
- Reference no.: 405

Gold Run was a former mining town of the California Gold Rush, located in Placer County, California.

The former settlement is a listed California Historical Landmark (#405).

== History ==
A post office was established titled "Mountain Springs", after the Mountain Springs Hotel, in 1854, a few miles southwest of Dutch Flat. The town was founded by O. W. Hollenbeck in 1854, and was known for its hydraulic mines.

The post office moved one mile north and the name was changed to Gold Run in 1863. $6,125,000 in gold was transferred out of the town between 1865 and 1878 due to the hydraulic mining.

Mining operations ceased in 1882, after a court ruling made hydraulic operations unprofitable. It is east of Rollins Reservoir in the Sierra Nevada foothills.

== Climate ==
This region experiences warm (but not hot) and dry summers, with no average monthly temperatures above 71.6 °F. According to the Köppen Climate Classification system, Gold Run has a warm-summer Mediterranean climate, abbreviated "Csb" on climate maps.

== See also ==
- California Historical Landmarks in Placer County, California
- Mining communities of the California Gold Rush
