= Auburn Ravine =

Foothill and valley stream in California, US

Coordinates: 38°51′09″N 121°31′26″W

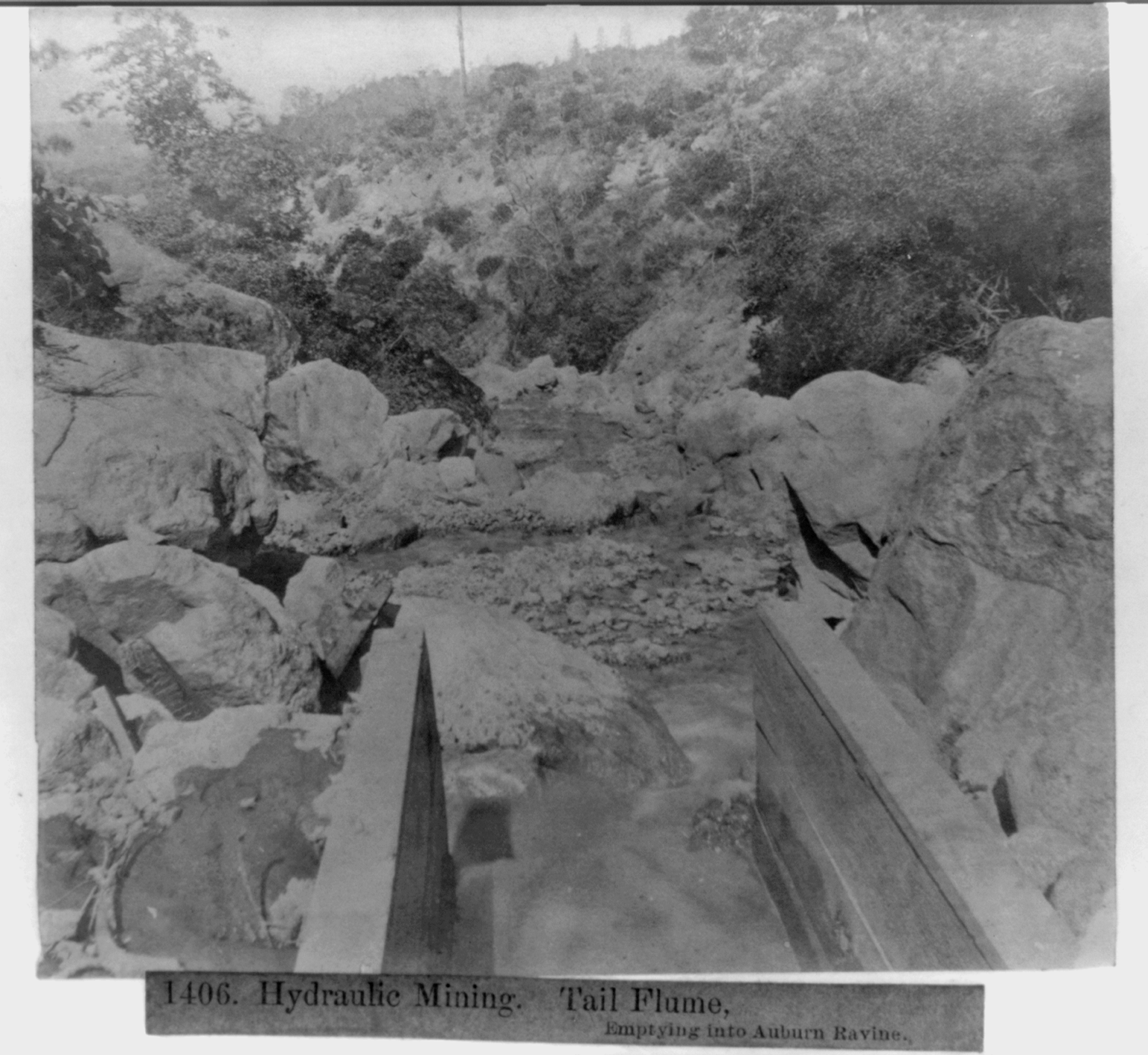
A Hydraulic Mining Tail Flume that empties into the Auburn Ravine

Auburn Ravine is a stream in north central California. It originates in Auburn and flows through Ophir, Newcastle and Lincoln. Continuing west across the valley floor, it enters the Sacramento River north of Sacramento.

== Water sources ==
Most of the water visible in the creek is imported from the Bear, Yuba, and American Rivers. Four organizations manage this extensive system of dams, canals, pipes and pumps, including Nevada Irrigation District (NID) and Placer County Water Agency (PCWA). In fact, the City of Lincoln purchases water from PCWA, some of which is provided by NID.

== Local support ==
The ravine has a non-profit support group, Friends of Auburn Ravine.

Local restoration efforts have also encouraged the reintegration of Salmon spawning upstream, after 2022 removal of a dam that inhbited migration. In late November of 2025, a team of 25 volunteers surveyed the steam looking for activity of salmon, and successfully found them as far as Gold Hill Road near Newcastle.
