= Ophir, California =

Unincorporated community in California, United States

Ophir
- Unincorporated community
- Location in California Ophir (the United States)
- Coordinates: 38°53′28″N 121°07′25″W
- Country: United States
- State: California
- County: Placer County
- Elevation: 682 ft (208 m)

California Historical Landmark
- Reference no.: 463

Ophir (also, Spanish Corral and Ophirville) is an unincorporated community in Placer County, California.

Ophir is located 2.5 miles (4.0 km) west of Auburn. It lies at an elevation of 682 feet (208 m).

Ophir addresses have the ZIP code of 95658, a Newcastle address.

== History ==
Ophir was a boomtown of the California Gold Rush. Originally named The Spanish Corral in 1849, Ophir received its Biblical name Ophir, the source of King Solomon's treasures, in 1850 because of the rich gold placer mining in the area. In 1852 it was the center of the local gold mining industry, and the most populous town in the county.

It grew to over 500 families by 1853, when a disastrous fire on the 12th of July destroyed the whole town. The town was not rebuilt at the time. Later Ophir became the center of quartz mining in the county. It is remembered at California Historical Landmark #463.

The Ophirville post office was open by 1852 and closed in 1866. The Ophir post office opened in 1872 and closed in 1910.

After the gold rush, the area was planted in vineyards and orchards, and during Prohibition just in orchards. Beginning in the 1970s vineyards again returned to the area. Today, local services for Ophir come from Auburn.
