= Tobacco water =

Traditional organic insecticide

Tobacco water, tobacco juice, tobacco dust juice, or tobacco lime is a traditional organic insecticide used in domestic gardening. In The English Physician Enlarged of 1681, and later editions, Nicholas Culpeper recommended tobacco juice to kill lice on children's heads, referencing it as an insecticide poison, as well as a general cure-all. Farmers have been using nicotine sulfate insecticide since the early 19th century.

Tobacco water is produced by boiling strong tobacco in water, or by steeping the tobacco in water for a longer period. When cool, the mixture can be applied with a spray, or 'painted' on to the leaves of garden plants, where it will prove deadly to insects.

Tobacco dust juice has a similar use but is produced by mixing water with tobacco dust and black pepper.

Basque angulero fishermen kill immature eels (elvers) in an infusion of tobacco leaves before parboiling them in salty water for transportation to market as angulas, a seasonal delicacy.
