= Tom Stienstra =

American author

- Born: 1954 or 1955
- Education: San Jose State University
- Occupation: Outdoor writer

Tom Stienstra (born 1954) is an American outdoorsman, author, and outdoors writer emeritus for the San Francisco Chronicle. He is also the outdoors editor emeritus for KCBS in San Francisco. He hosted and co-produced a television special for PBS on the Tuolumne River and has written several hiking and camping guide books. He has won many awards from the Outdoor Writers Association of America. In 2026, he published his first hardback book, Heaven Delayed

A severe brain injury as a young man shaped his view of the world towards appreciation of the wilderness, and in the 2020s he was treated for brain cancer. According this his book, Heaven Delayed, from 2021 to 2025, Tom had seven brain surgeries, one fluid-blood drain, seven CyberKnife treatments and two years of immunotherapy infusions.

== Early life and education ==
Stienstra grew up in Palo Alto, California, where he graduated from Palo Alto High School in 1972. He was editor of the Sentinel at Foothill College in Los Altos Hills and received his degree in journalism in 1976 from San Jose State University.

In 1975, when he was 21, Stienstra was in college and working alone at night at a gas station in Menlo Park when he received a severe head wound from a hatchet during an attempted robbery. Later treated for post-traumatic stress disorder, he adopted a dog he named Rebel and began to spend as much time as possible in the remote outdoors, frequently hiking into wilderness areas of California and beyond. He also obtained a pilot's license. After Rebel's death, he adopted several more dogs as hiking companions.

== Career ==
Stienstra published his first story at age 8, "Searching for a Lost Friend" in the Palo Alto Times, which hired him as sports reporter after his graduation. In 1979, when the Palo Alto Times merged with the Redwood City Tribune to become the Peninsula Times Tribune, Stienstra was promoted to sports columnist. In 1980, he was hired to write about the outdoors for the San Francisco Examiner, which at the time operated jointly with the Chronicle. He is now the Chronicle's "outdoor writer emeritus".

Since 2000, Stienstra has produced and broadcast a radio feature for KCBS in San Francisco, and has appeared frequently as a live guest expert. He hosted the TV show The Great Outdoors for the CBS and CW networks and in 2017 hosted and co-produced with Jim Schlosser a national PBS special, The Mighty T — The Tuolumne River, from Glacier to Golden Gate.

=== Books ===
Stienstra has written many wilderness hiking and camping guidebooks, including 52 Weekend Adventures, Moon California Camping, and Moon Pacific Northwest Camping, which have received No. 1 sales rankings. In 2026, he published his first hardcover book, Heaven Delayed

=== Awards ===
Stienstra has won a number of awards from the Outdoor Writers Association of America (OWAA). In 2015, he became the first four-time winner of the OWAA President's Award as "Best of the Best" when he won best story of the year in the Newspaper/Website division for "Paddling with Giants". In 2017, when he won the President's Award for best outdoors television show for his PBS special on the Tuolumne River, he was the only member to win simultaneous first-place awards in newspaper, photography and television. In 2021, he became the first OWAA writer from California to receive the OWAA's Joan Wulff Enduring Excellence Award for career achievement.

Stienstra's film on the Tuolumne also won the 2017 Northern California Area Emmy Award for Health / Science / Environmental Special.

Stienstra was inducted into the California Outdoors Hall of Fame in 2003.

== Personal life ==
Stienstra was formerly married to Stephani Cruickshank. In 2015, he married Denese Stienstra, with whom he has two stepsons.

In August 2021, Stienstra was diagnosed with Stage 4 metastasized melanoma, presumed to be caused by heavy sun exposure at high altitudes, and underwent brain surgery. In 2026, from his book Heaven Delayed, he writes that at Stanford Medical Center, doctors performed seven brain surgeries, seven CyberKnife radiation burns, and two years of immunotherapy infusions, and later, that MRI, PET and CAT scans found no active cancer.
