= Colfax, California =

City in California, United States

- City
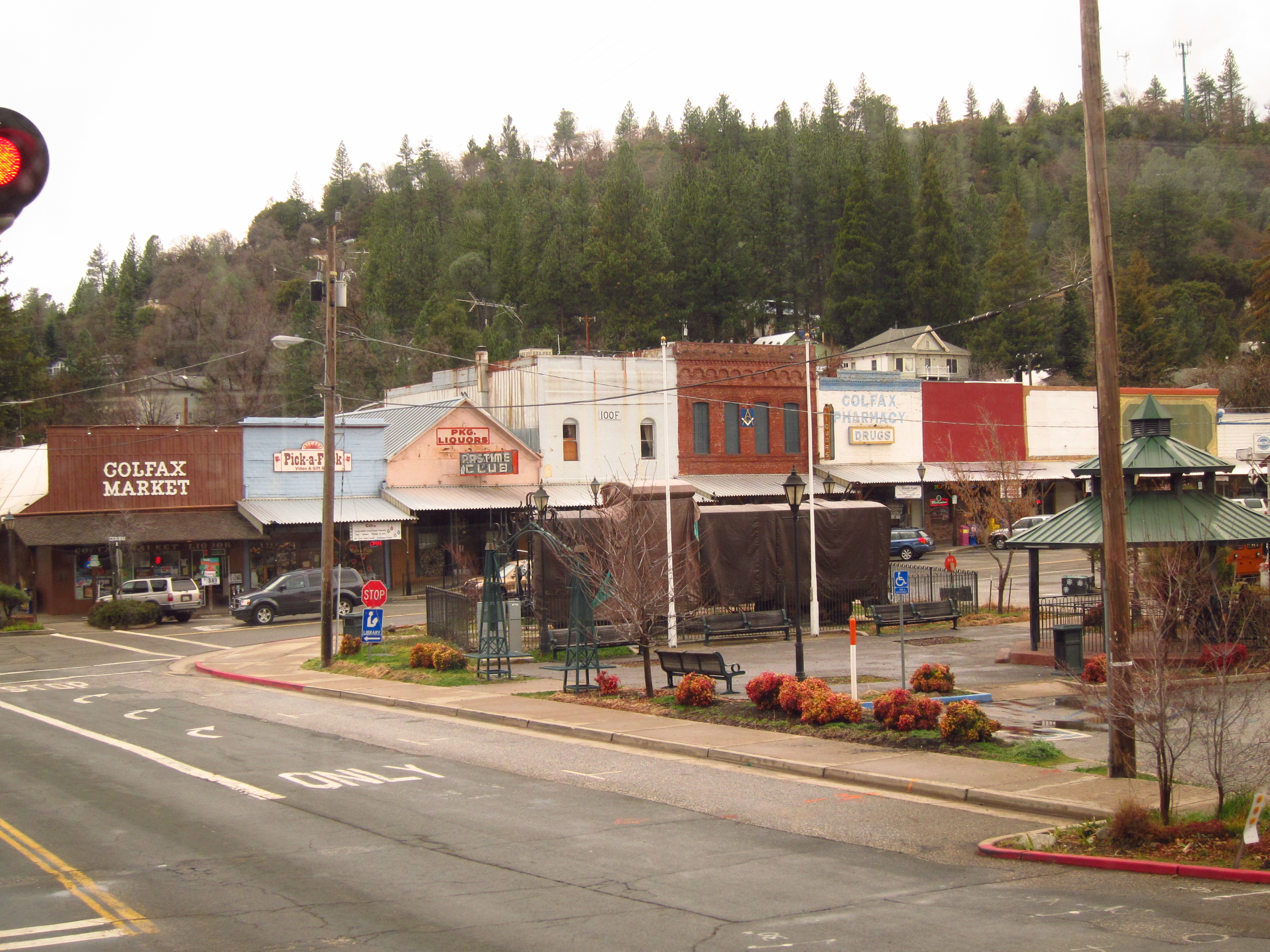

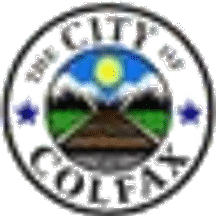
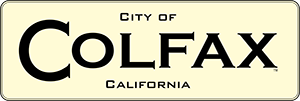
- Seal Logo
- Interactive map of Colfax, California
- Location in the United States
- Coordinates: 39°5′50″N 120°57′14″W
- Country: United States
- State: California
- County: Placer
- Incorporated: February 23, 1910
- Named after: Schuyler Colfax

Government
  - Mayor: Sean Lomen
  - Mayor Pro Tem: Caroline McCully
  - Councilmember: Kim Douglas
  - Councilmember: Larry Hillberg
  - Councilmember: Trinity Burruss

Area
  - Total: 1.41 sq mi (3.64 km^{2})
  - Land: 1.41 sq mi (3.64 km^{2})
  - Water: 0 sq mi (0.00 km^{2}) 0%
- Elevation: 2,425 ft (739 m)

Population (2020)
  - Total: 1,995
  - Density: 1,418.9/sq mi (547.85/km^{2})
- Time zone: UTC−8 (Pacific)
  - Summer (DST): UTC−7 (PDT)
- ZIP Code: 95713
- Area codes: 530, 837
- FIPS code: 06-14498
- GNIS feature ID: 1655912
- Website: www.colfax-ca.gov

Colfax is a city in Placer County, California, at the crossroads of Interstate 80 and State Route 174. The population was 1,995 at the 2020 census. The town is named in honor of U.S. Vice President Schuyler Colfax (1869–73), a bronze statue of whom stands at Railroad Street and Grass Valley Street. (This is one of two known statues of Schuyler Colfax in the United States, the other located in Indianapolis, Indiana.)

Some of the town's notable features include the newly restored Southern Pacific Railroad colonnade-style depot (which houses the Colfax Museum and Chamber of Commerce) built in 1905, the downtown shops on Main Street, and Colfax High School, which serves a large surrounding area.

== History ==
The area was initially denoted as "Camp 20" along the route of the transcontinental railroad. in July 1865, the Pacific Railroad Company (later to become the Union Pacific Railroad), purchased land along the railroad route near Illinoistown, and surveyed it into lots, and lots were offered for sale on July 29.

The city was renamed Colfax after then Speaker of the House (and later Vice President) Schuyler Colfax who visited the town in 1865 while inspecting progress of construction of the Central Pacific Railroad, the western portion of the first transcontinental railroad. The city was the southern terminus of the Nevada County Narrow Gauge Railroad from 1876 until the railroad's removal in 1942. Historic U.S. Route 40 also runs through the city as well as the more modern Interstate 80. The city is mentioned in Jules Verne’s book Around the World in Eighty Days.

Note that the town was a separate settlement from nearby Illinoistown. Illinoistown did NOT change its name to Colfax.

In July 2015 the Lowell Fire burned thousands of acres nearby, forcing evacuation in Nevada County.

On August 4, 2021, the River Fire started in the Bear River Campground, forcing thousands of residents on both the Placer and Nevada county sides of the river to evacuate. The fire was contained nine days later after burning over 2,600 acres (11 km^{2}) and dozens of homes.

In December 2021, the city was placed under a state of emergency due to severe snow storms. More than 575,000 metered electric customers in Northern California were without power at some point during the storm, with about 141,000 still without power one month after the first major outage. The mayor at the time, Trinity Burruss, urged citizens to help each other and deputized some of her family members to run snowplows in order to get roads cleared.

== Geography ==
Colfax is located at 39°5′50″N 120°57′14″W (39.097260, −120.954017). According to the United States Census Bureau, the city has a total area of 1.4 square miles (3.6 km^{2}), all of it land.

The principal geologic structures present are granitic and metamorphic rock formations. Located approximately 1 mile (1.6 km) west of Colfax is a branch of the Melones Fault, running in north to south direction. Because the fault runs through the old grammar school baseball field, the school was closed. (Earth Metrics, 1989) Another branch of the same fault is located about 1.2 miles (1.9 km) to the east, also aligned in a north–south orientation. No movement has been recorded by the U.S. Geological Survey, and the faults are considered inactive.

Bunch Creek is an active water source flowing south to eventually reach a confluence with the North Fork of the American River.

Colfax sits a few miles outside the Tahoe National Forest as I-80 begins its climb into the Sierras. Because of its location, it is considered at high risk of wildfire.

=== Climate ===
Colfax has a hot-summer Mediterranean climate (Köppen Csa) characterized by cool, wet winters and hot, dry summers. Summers can be quite hot, especially in the months of July and August, when temperatures easily reach 90 °F (32 °C) with plenty of sunshine. Winters, on the other hand, are quite cool, with temperatures in December hovering around 46 °F (8 °C); and owing to its altitude above sea level, Colfax some years sees snow accumulation.

Climate data for Colfax, California, 1991–2020 normals, extremes 1905–present
Month	Jan	Feb	Mar	Apr	May	Jun	Jul	Aug	Sep	Oct	Nov	Dec	Year
Record high °F (°C)	84 (29)	88 (31)	89 (32)	91 (33)	100 (38)	110 (43)	113 (45)	110 (43)	106 (41)	102 (39)	86 (30)	87 (31)	113 (45)
Mean daily maximum °F (°C)	54.9 (12.7)	56.9 (13.8)	60.3 (15.7)	65.6 (18.7)	74.2 (23.4)	83.4 (28.6)	92.1 (33.4)	91.4 (33.0)	86.4 (30.2)	75.0 (23.9)	61.1 (16.2)	53.5 (11.9)	71.2 (21.8)
Daily mean °F (°C)	45.8 (7.7)	47.1 (8.4)	49.9 (9.9)	54.1 (12.3)	61.6 (16.4)	69.7 (20.9)	77.3 (25.2)	76.2 (24.6)	71.7 (22.1)	61.9 (16.6)	50.9 (10.5)	44.8 (7.1)	59.2 (15.1)
Mean daily minimum °F (°C)	36.7 (2.6)	37.4 (3.0)	39.5 (4.2)	42.6 (5.9)	49.1 (9.5)	56.1 (13.4)	62.5 (16.9)	61.1 (16.2)	57.1 (13.9)	48.8 (9.3)	40.8 (4.9)	36.1 (2.3)	47.3 (8.5)
Record low °F (°C)	4 (−16)	15 (−9)	12 (−11)	20 (−7)	25 (−4)	30 (−1)	40 (4)	38 (3)	30 (−1)	24 (−4)	18 (−8)	9 (−13)	4 (−16)
Average precipitation inches (mm)	7.83 (199)	8.02 (204)	7.24 (184)	3.58 (91)	2.27 (58)	0.70 (18)	0.02 (0.51)	0.11 (2.8)	0.35 (8.9)	2.11 (54)	5.15 (131)	8.52 (216)	45.90 (1,166)
Average snowfall inches (cm)	0.9 (2.3)	2.6 (6.6)	1.2 (3.0)	0.6 (1.5)	0.0 (0.0)	0.0 (0.0)	0.0 (0.0)	0.0 (0.0)	0.0 (0.0)	0.0 (0.0)	0.4 (1.0)	1.5 (3.8)	7.2 (18.2)
Average precipitation days (≥ 0.01 in)	11.1	11.5	10.9	7.7	5.6	2.2	0.2	0.5	1.2	4.1	9.1	11.4	75.5
Average snowy days (≥ 0.01 in)	0.4	1.0	1.0	0.4	0.0	0.0	0.0	0.0	0.0	0.0	0.2	0.6	3.6
Source: NOAA

== Demographics ==
Historical population
Census	Pop.	Note	%±
1880	591		—
1890	670		13.4%
1910	621		—
1920	573		−7.7%
1930	912		59.2%
1940	794		−12.9%
1950	820		3.3%
1960	915		11.6%
1970	798		−12.8%
1980	981		22.9%
1990	1,306		33.1%
2000	1,496		14.5%
2010	1,963		31.2%
2020	1,995		1.6%
2025 (est.)	2,407	▲	20.7%
U.S. Decennial Census

=== 2020 census ===
As of the 2020 census, Colfax had a population of 1,995 and a population density of 1,418.9 inhabitants per square mile (547.8/km^{2}). The median age was 38.6 years. The age distribution was 421 people (21.1%) under age 18, 177 (8.9%) aged 18 to 24, 539 (27.0%) aged 25 to 44, 500 (25.1%) aged 45 to 64, and 358 (17.9%) aged 65 or older. For every 100 females, there were 96.7 males, and for every 100 females age 18 and over, there were 93.8 males age 18 and over.

The whole population lived in households. There were 862 households, of which 251 (29.1%) had children under age 18. Of all households, 316 (36.7%) were married-couple households, 83 (9.6%) were cohabiting-couple households, 262 (30.4%) had a female householder with no spouse or partner present, and 201 (23.3%) had a male householder with no spouse or partner present. In addition, 283 households (32.8%) were made up of individuals, and 137 (15.9%) had someone living alone who was 65 or older. The average household size was 2.31, and there were 497 families (57.7% of all households).

There were 921 housing units at an average density of 655.0 units per square mile (252.9 units/km^{2}), of which 862 (93.6%) were occupied and 59 (6.4%) were vacant. Of occupied units, 447 (51.9%) were owner-occupied and 415 (48.1%) were renter-occupied. The homeowner vacancy rate was 0.4%, and the rental vacancy rate was 3.7%.

0.0% of residents lived in urban areas, while 100.0% lived in rural areas.

Racial composition as of the 2020 census
Race	Number	Percent
White	1,625	81.5%
Black or African American	10	0.5%
American Indian and Alaska Native	40	2.0%
Asian	23	1.2%
Native Hawaiian and Other Pacific Islander	5	0.3%
Some other race	68	3.4%
Two or more races	224	11.2%
Hispanic or Latino (of any race)	210	10.5%

== Transportation ==
Amtrak, the national passenger rail system, provides service to Colfax. The city's passenger rail station is located at 99 Railroad Street in the heart of town. Amtrak Train 5, the westbound California Zephyr, is scheduled to depart Colfax at 11:48 a.m. daily with service to Roseville, Sacramento, Davis, Martinez, and Emeryville across the bay from San Francisco. Amtrak Train 6, the eastbound California Zephyr, is scheduled to depart Colfax at 12:21 p.m. daily with service to Truckee, Reno, Sparks, Winnemucca, Elko, Salt Lake City, Provo, Helper, Green River, Grand Junction, Glenwood Springs, Denver, Omaha, Galesburg, and Chicago. A bronze statue of the town's namesake, Schuyler Colfax, stands near the depot at the Grass Valley Street railroad grade crossing.

Amtrak Thruway 20 provides a daily connection from Colfax Depot to Sacramento Valley Station to the west, and Reno/Sparks, Nevada to the east, with a few stops in between.

Placer County Transit provides commuter service to/from Colfax Depot to/from downtown Sacramento and several other California cities. All routes operate Monday-Saturday, with the exceptions of Route 40, Placer Commuter Express (which run weekdays only) and Lincoln School Tripper (which runs on school days). There is no service on Sundays and holidays.

Greyhound, the national intercity bus system, also provides service to and from Colfax.

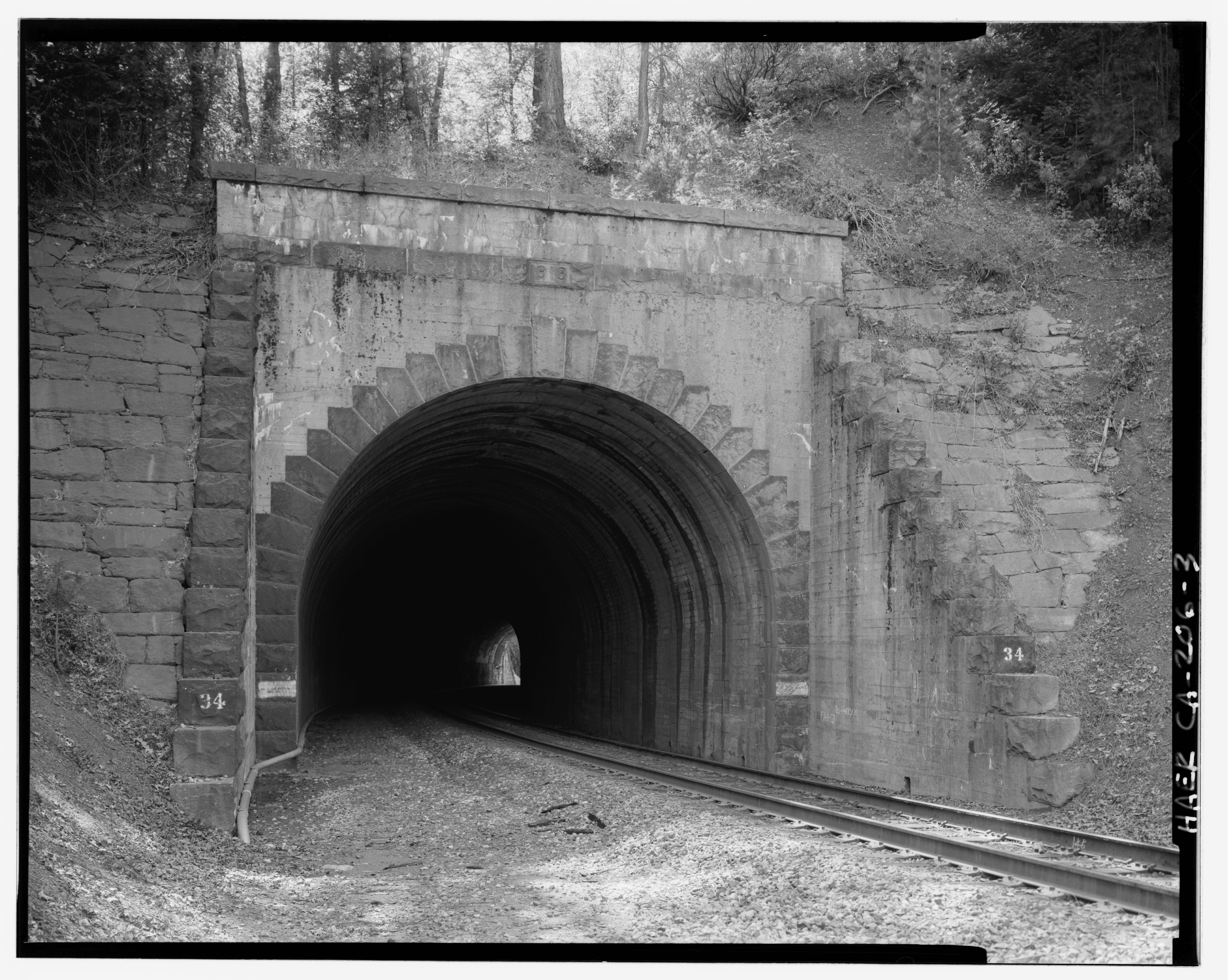
East portal of Tunnel 34, Colfax, on the historic Central Pacific Railroad.

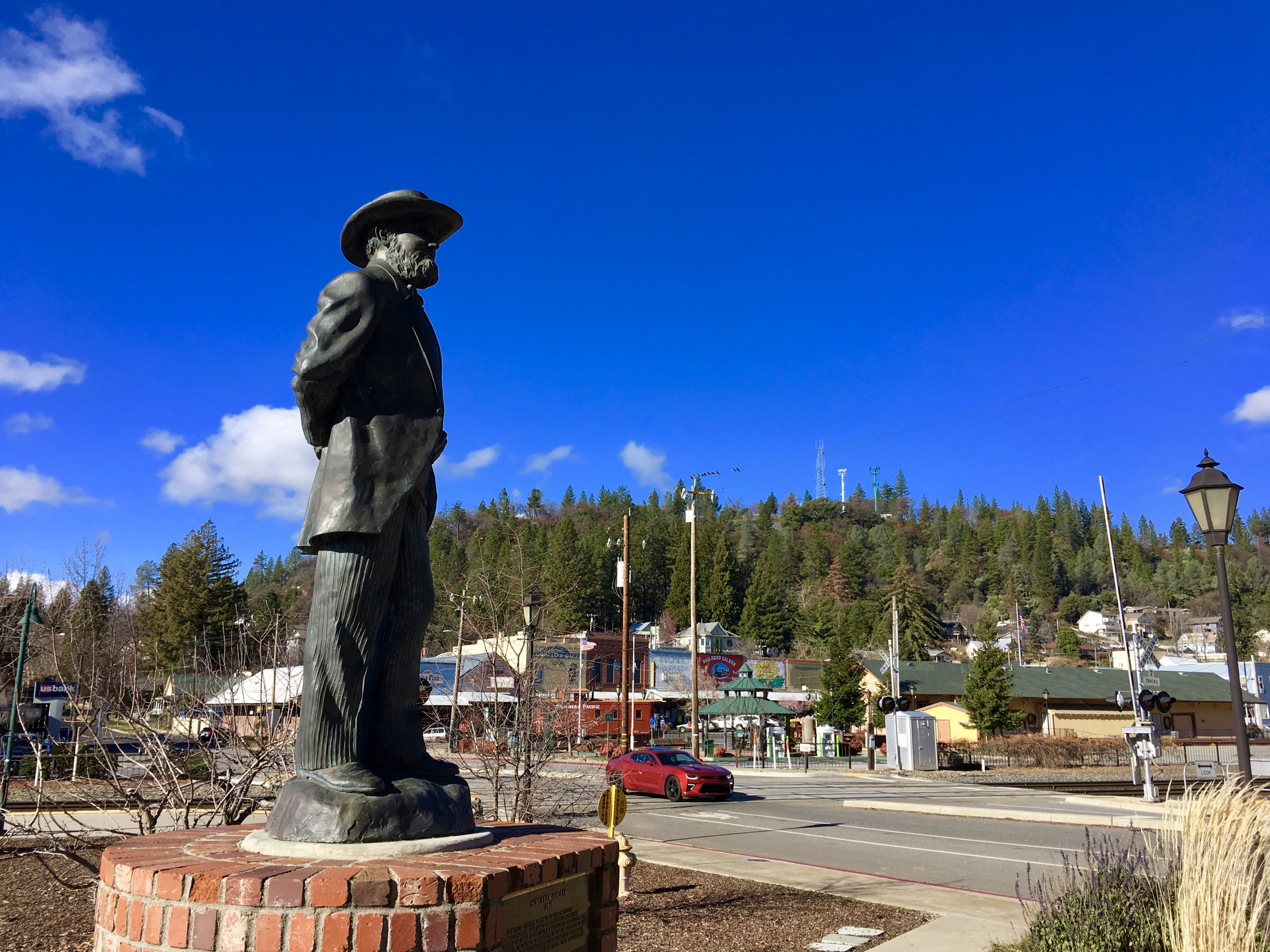
A statue of the city's namesake U.S. Vice President Schuyler Colfax in historic downtown Colfax, near the railroad station.

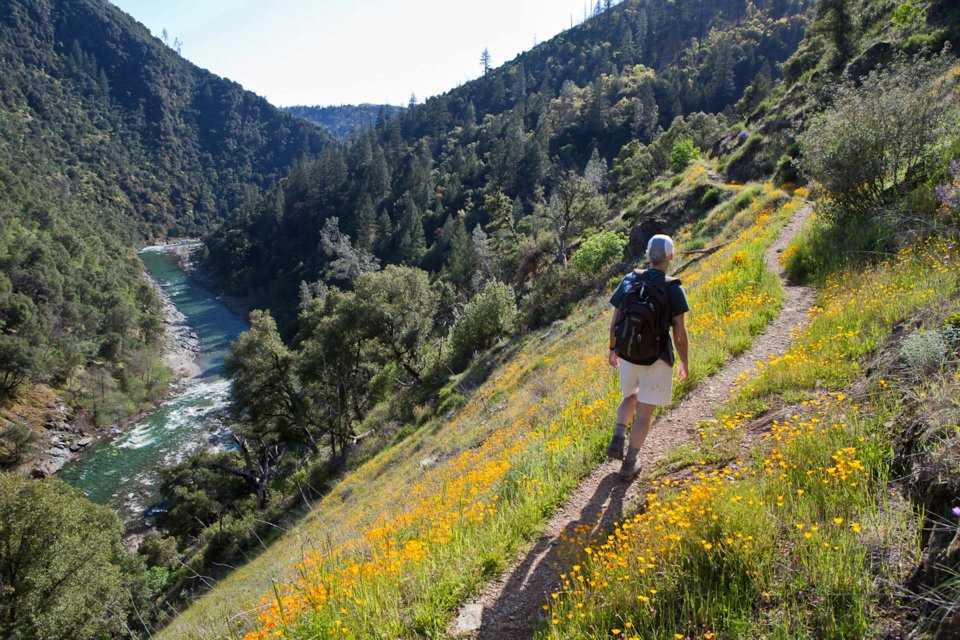
The trailhead of historic Stevens Trail in Colfax.
