= National Register of Historic Places listings in Placer County, California =

Location of Placer County in California

This is a list of the National Register of Historic Places listings in Placer County, California.

This is intended to be a complete list of the properties and districts on the National Register of Historic Places in Placer County, California, United States. Latitude and longitude coordinates are provided for many National Register properties and districts; these locations may be seen together in an online map.

There are 36 properties and districts listed on the National Register in the county, including one National Historic Landmark.

This National Park Service list is complete through NPS recent listings posted September 4, 2026.

== Current listings ==
	Name on the Register	Image	Date listed	Location	City or town	Description
1	Auburn City Hall and Fire House	Auburn City Hall and Fire House	December 19, 2011 (#11000935)	1103 High St. 38°53′54″N 121°04′13″W	Auburn	
2	Auburn Fire House No. 1	Auburn Fire House No. 1	December 19, 2011 (#11000936)	El Dorado St. & Lincoln Way; 38°54′14″N 121°03′59″W	Auburn	
3	Auburn Fire House No. 2	Auburn Fire House No. 2	December 19, 2011 (#11000937)	Corner of Washington, Main, & Commercial Sts. 38°53′45″N 121°04′50″W	Auburn	
4	Auburn Grammar School	Auburn Grammar School	March 2, 2012 (#11000938)	1225 Lincoln Way; 38°53′52″N 121°04′30″W	Auburn	
5	Auburn Masonic Temple	Auburn Masonic Temple	December 19, 2011 (#11000939)	948 Lincoln Way; 38°53′56″N 121°04′15″W	Auburn	
6	Auburn Public Library	Auburn Public Library	March 31, 2011 (#11000153)	175 Almond St. 38°53′59″N 121°04′19″W	Auburn	
7	Irene Burns House	Irene Burns House	April 9, 2013 (#13000141)	405 Linden Ave. 38°53′55″N 121°04′00″W	Auburn	
8	California Granite Company	California Granite Company	July 3, 2012 (#12000375)	5255 Pacific St. 38°47′21″N 121°14′08″W	Rocklin	
9	Carnegie Library	Carnegie Library	April 10, 2009 (#09000199)	557 Lincoln St. 38°45′13″N 121°17′07″W	Roseville	
10	Chapel of the Transfiguration	Chapel of the Transfiguration	August 18, 2011 (#11000534)	855 W. Lake Blvd. 39°09′12″N 120°08′50″W	Tahoe City	
11	Colfax Freight Depot	Colfax Freight Depot	December 17, 1999 (#99001564)	7 Main St. 39°06′04″N 120°57′11″W	Colfax	
12	Colfax Passenger Depot	Colfax Passenger Depot	January 15, 1999 (#98001605)	Main St. and Railroad Ave. 39°05′58″N 120°57′08″W	Colfax	
13	Earl Crabbe Gymnasium	Earl Crabbe Gymnasium	July 31, 2017 (#100001384)	Agard St. 38°53′42″N 121°04′13″W	Auburn	
14	DeWitt General Hospital	DeWitt General Hospital	February 12, 2016 (#16000003)	1st St. & Bell Ave. 38°56′31″N 121°06′14″W	Auburn	
15	Dutch Flat Historic District	Dutch Flat Historic District	March 28, 1973 (#73000419)	Main and Stockton Sts. 39°12′17″N 120°50′05″W	Dutch Flat	
16	El Toyon	El Toyon	March 31, 2010 (#10000118)	211 Brook Rd. 38°53′46″N 121°03′41″W	Auburn	
17	Fiddyment Ranch Main Complex	Fiddyment Ranch Main Complex	July 26, 2010 (#10000503)	4440 Phillip Rd. 38°47′07″N 121°22′38″W	Roseville	
18	Griffith House	Griffith House	December 19, 1978 (#78000733)	7325 English Colony Way; 38°51′08″N 121°09′55″W	Penryn	
19	Griffith Quarry	Griffith Quarry	October 20, 1977 (#77000322)	Taylor Rd. 38°50′58″N 121°09′44″W	Penryn	
20	Haman House	Haman House	November 17, 1976 (#76000507)	424 Oak St. 38°44′49″N 121°17′04″W	Roseville	
21	Lake Tahoe Dam	Lake Tahoe Dam	March 25, 1981 (#81000713)	SR 89 at Truckee River; 39°10′01″N 120°08′38″W	Tahoe City	
22	Lincoln Public Library	Lincoln Public Library	December 10, 1990 (#90001814)	590 Fifth St. 38°53′29″N 121°17′26″W	Lincoln	
23	Michigan Bluff-Last Chance Trail	Michigan Bluff-Last Chance Trail	June 26, 1992 (#92000854)	From Michigan Bluff NE to Last Chance; 39°04′38″N 120°40′59″W	Michigan Bluff	
24	Mountain Quarries Bridge	Mountain Quarries Bridge	February 11, 2004 (#04000014)	North Fork of the American River; 38°54′46″N 121°02′30″W	Auburn	Concrete arch bridge built in 1912, spanning the North Fork of the American River. Spans into El Dorado County.
25	Newcastle Portuguese Hall	Newcastle Portuguese Hall	March 25, 1982 (#82002225)	Taylor Rd. 38°52′25″N 121°08′24″W	Newcastle	
26	Oddfellows Hall	Oddfellows Hall	December 19, 2011 (#11000940)	1256 Lincoln Way; 38°53′52″N 121°04′30″W	Auburn	Three-story red brick Italianate home of IOOF Lodge No. 7, founded in 1852. Henry T. Holmes, builder of the Hall, was a '49er and a founding father of Auburn.
27	Old Auburn Historic District	Old Auburn Historic District	December 29, 1970 (#70000138)	Roughly bounded by Maple, Commercial, Court, Washington, Spring, and Sacramento Sts. 38°53′39″N 121°04′34″W	Auburn	
28	Outlet Gates and Gatekeeper's Cabin	Outlet Gates and Gatekeeper's Cabin	December 13, 1972 (#72000245)	U.S. 89 at mouth of Truckee River; 39°10′00″N 120°08′33″W	Tahoe City	
29	Placer County Administrative Center		July 7, 2025 (#100011991)	175 Fulweiler Ave; 38°54′14″N 121°04′50″W	Auburn	
30	Stevens Trail	Stevens Trail	November 20, 2002 (#02001391)	Roughly bounded Iowa Hill, canyon of North fork Of American R., until at Secret Ravine, top of ridge of Colfax; 39°06′52″N 120°54′17″W	Colfax	
31	Strap Ravine Nisenan Maidu Indian Site	Strap Ravine Nisenan Maidu Indian Site	January 8, 1973 (#73000420)	1970 Johnson Ranch Dr. 38°44′19″N 121°14′45″W	Roseville	
32	Summit Camp		December 13, 2024 (#100011384)	Donner Pass Road; 39°18′55″N 120°19′25″W	Norden vicinity	Archaeological remains of a 19th-century camp of Chinese workers building the nearby railroad; extends into Nevada County.
33	Summit Soda Springs		December 15, 1978 (#78000734)	Southeast of Soda Springs; 39°14′48″N 120°19′30″W	Soda Springs	
34	Watson Log Cabin	Watson Log Cabin	August 24, 1979 (#79000518)	560 N. Lake Blvd; 39°10′17″N 120°08′20″W	Tahoe City	
35	Laura Russ Westphal House		July 21, 2025 (#100012018)	2540 West Lake Boulevard; 39°07′40″N 120°09′40″W	Homewood	
36	Woman's Club of Lincoln	Woman's Club of Lincoln	May 30, 2001 (#01000331)	499 E St. 38°53′29″N 121°17′19″W	Lincoln	

== See also ==
- List of National Historic Landmarks in California
- National Register of Historic Places listings in California
- California Historical Landmarks in Placer County, California
