= Griffith Quarry =

- U.S. National Register of Historic Places
- California Historical Landmark No. 885
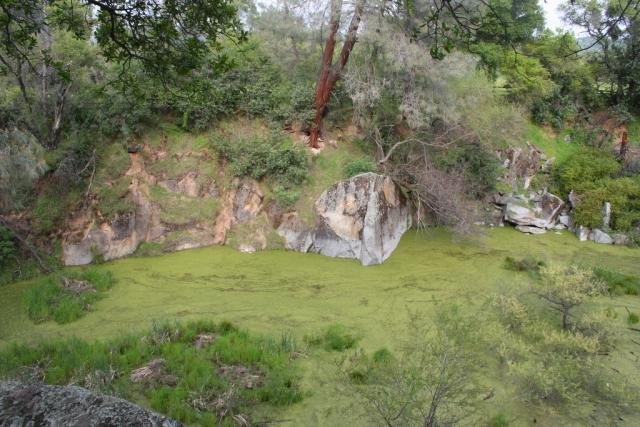
- View of the dig-site at Griffith Quarry
- Location: Penryn, California
- Coordinates: 38°51′4.07″N 121°9′51.98″W
- Area: 22 acres (8.9 ha)
- Built: 1864
- NRHP reference No.: 77000322
- CHISL No.: 885
- Added to NRHP: October 20, 1977

Griffith Quarry, a registered California Historical Landmark listed on the National Register of Historic Places, was a former granite quarry near Penryn, California.

== History ==
The quarry was established by Griffith Griffith, a native of Wales, in 1864. The quarry produced high-quality granite used to construct many buildings in San Francisco and Sacramento, including parts of the California State Capitol. The 23 acres (9.3 ha) that surround the 2-storey building, made of granite blocks, are the remains of the quarry and its polishing mill. This mill was the first successful granite polishing mill in California.

The office of Penryn Granite Works, which ran the quarry, is now the Griffith Quarry Museum that contains history about the site as well as other local history. Some of the original furniture of the Griffith Quarry is intact.

== Recreation ==
Dirt walking trails can be found throughout the 23-acre park. These trails take visitors through the ruins of the polishing mill and some of the quarry holes from which granite was taken. Printed trail guides are available in the museum.

== See also ==
- California Historical Landmarks in Placer County, California
- National Register of Historic Places listings in Placer County, California
