= Auburn Masonic Temple =

Auburn Masonic Temple may refer to

- Auburn Masonic Temple (Auburn, California), on the NRHP in California, United States
- Auburn Masonic Temple (Auburn, Washington), an historic building in Auburn, Washington, United States
