= Griffith Griffith =

Griffith Griffith may be:

- Griffith W. Griffith (1883–1967), minister
- Griffith J. Griffith (1850–1919), businessman
- Griffith Griffith (Penryn), 1823–1899, founder of Penryn, California
