= Watson Creek (California) =

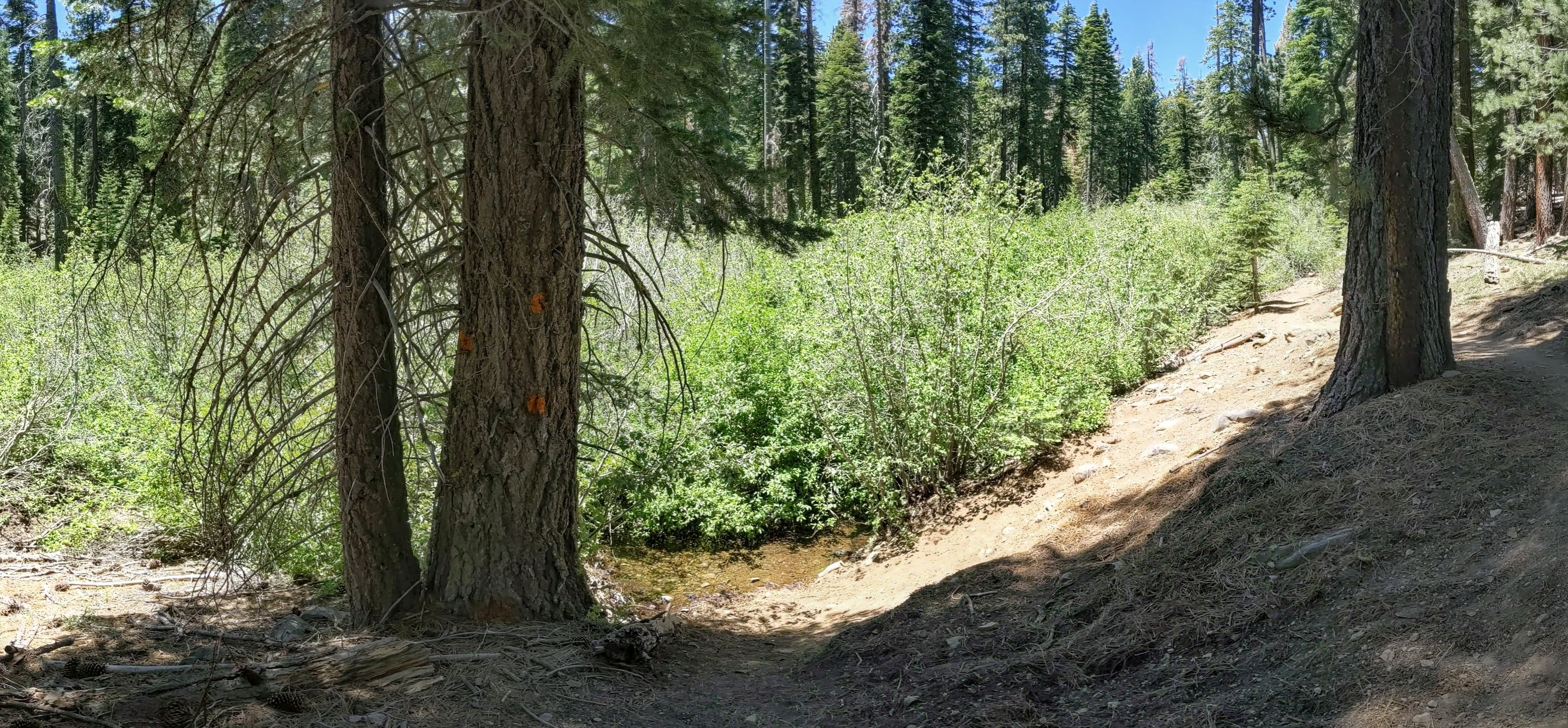
- Watson Creek above Carnelian Bay, California

Location
- Country: United States
- State: California
- Region: Placer County

Physical characteristics
- Source: a meadow north of Watson Lake and Mount Watson
  - location: Tahoe National Forest
  - coordinates: 39°13′39″N 120°08′22″W
  - elevation: 7,760 ft (2,370 m)
- Mouth: Lake Tahoe
  - location: Carnelian Bay, California
  - coordinates: 39°13′07″N 120°05′11″W
  - elevation: 6,230 ft (1,900 m)

Watson Creek is a stream in northern California. It runs about 3 miles, from its source near Watson Lake, below Mount Watson, draining into Lake Tahoe. The Tahoe Rim Trail runs across the creek in its headwaters meadow, and along the eastern shore of the lake.

The creek and lake and peak are named for Robert Montgomery Watson, who came to Lake Tahoe in 1875. Watson built the Watson Log Cabin, the only historic log cabin in Tahoe City, California.

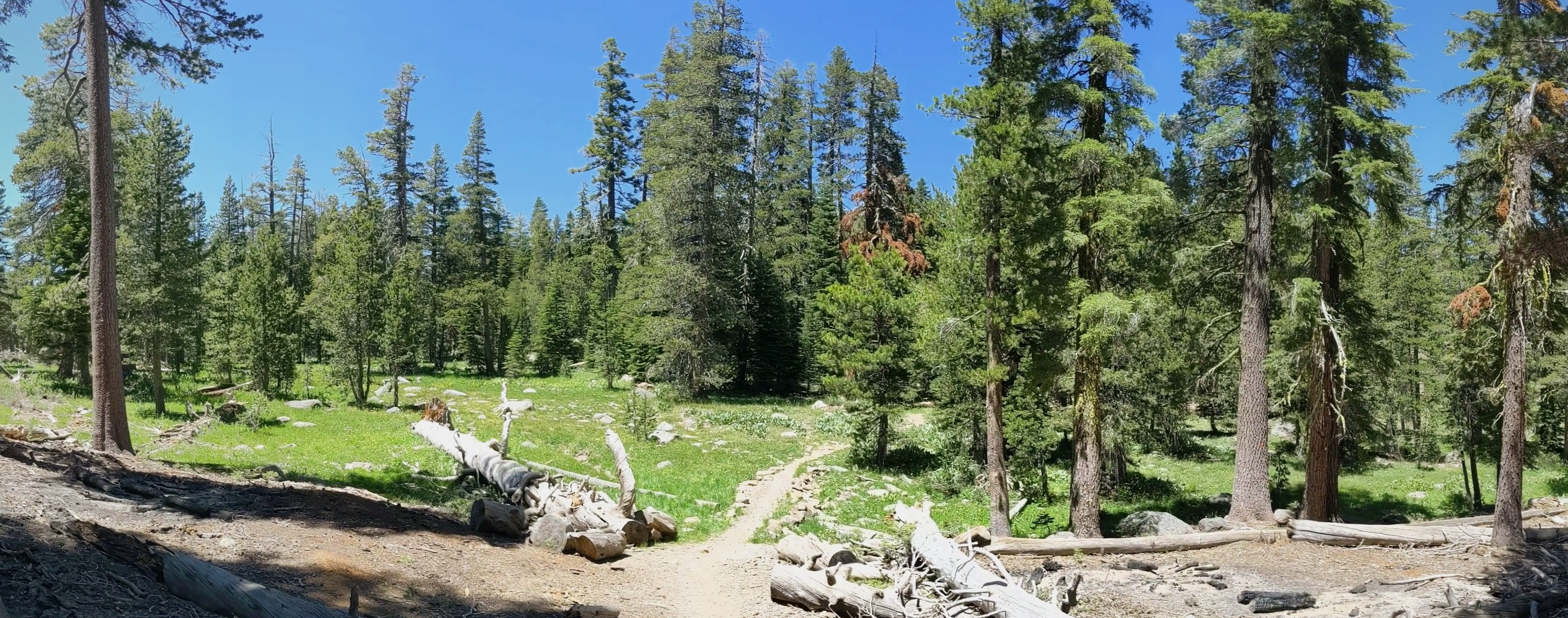
The Tahoe Rim Trail crosses the headwaters meadow.

== Watson Lake ==
Watson Lake is at an elevation of 7,759 ft (2,365 m). The headwaters of Watson Creek is separated from Watson Lake by a granite ridge. The lake's outflow is a minor tributary that joins the creek just downstream.

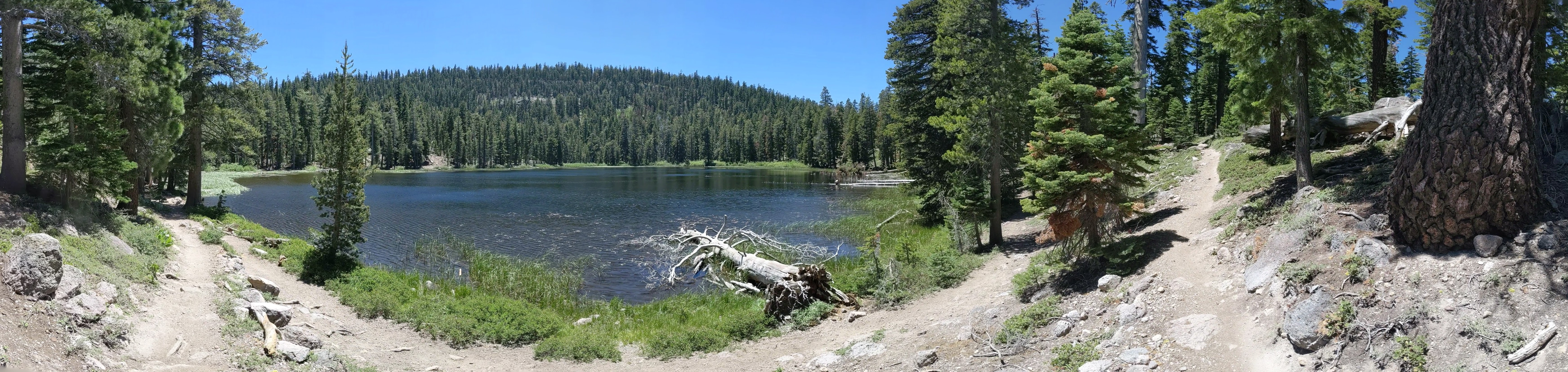
Panoramic view of Watson Lake from the Tahoe Rim Trail. To the right, the trail goes north over the ridge to where it crosses the creek. To the left, the trail crosses the outflow channel of the lake, which is a tributary to the creek, and continues south toward Lake Tahoe.

== Mount Watson ==
Mount Watson is a peak at 8,405 ft (2,562 m) elevation, just north of Tahoe City, with commanding views of Lake Tahoe and a view of Watson Lake.

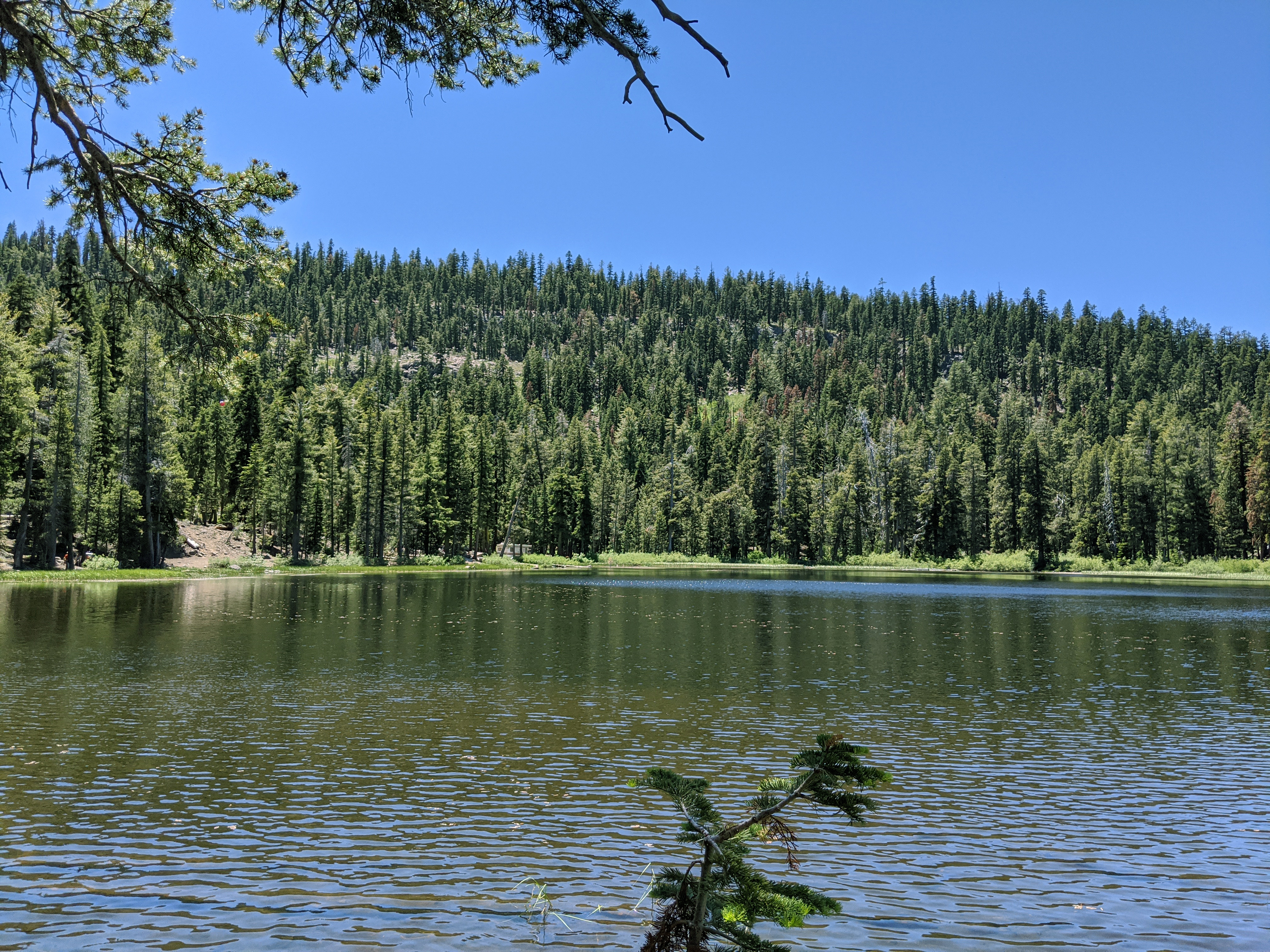
Mount Watson's steep rocky slope over the southwest side of Watson Lake, viewed from the northeast shore of Watson Lake

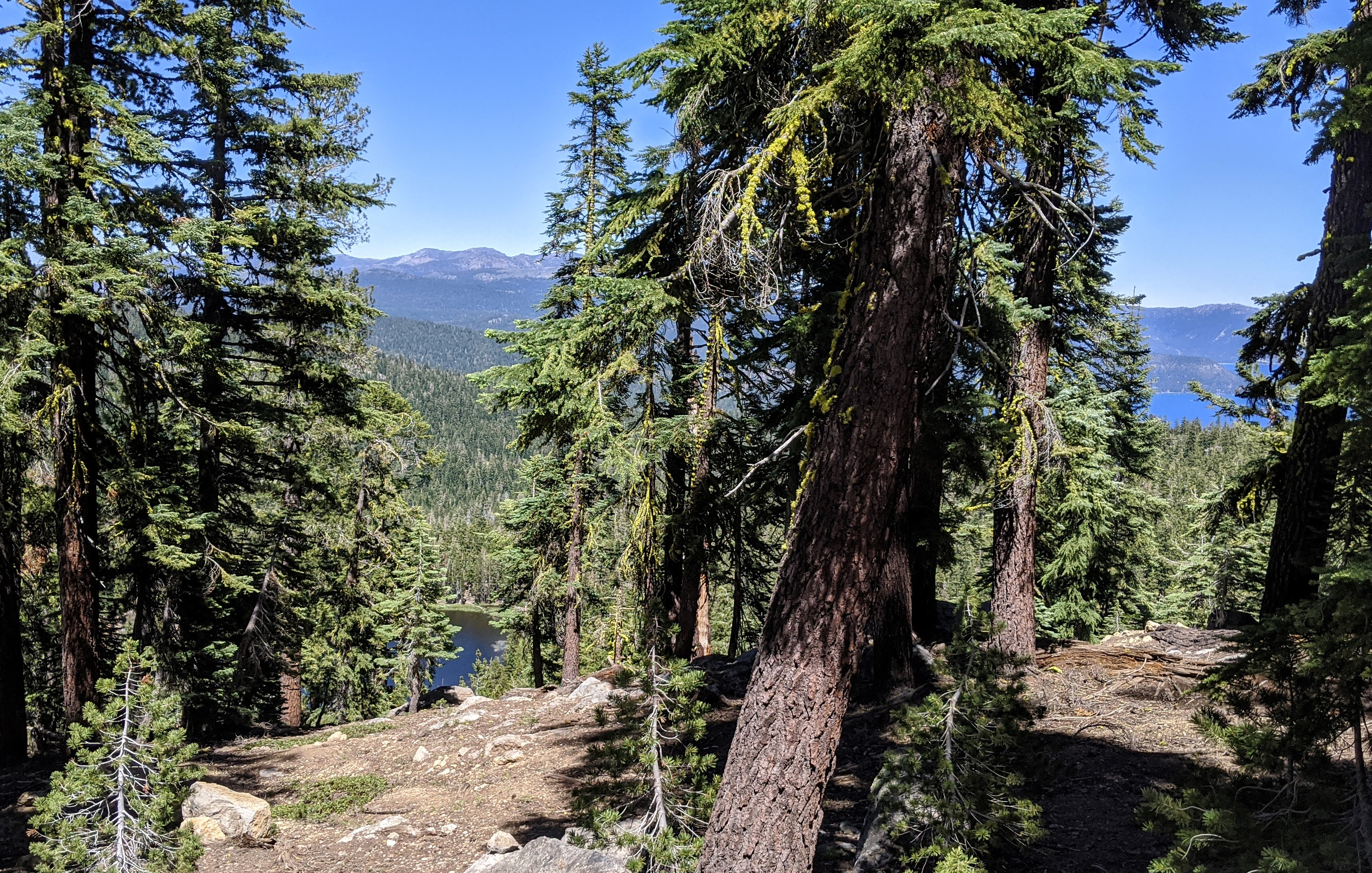
Watson Lake (lower left) and Lake Tahoe (upper right) from the road near the summit of Mount Watson

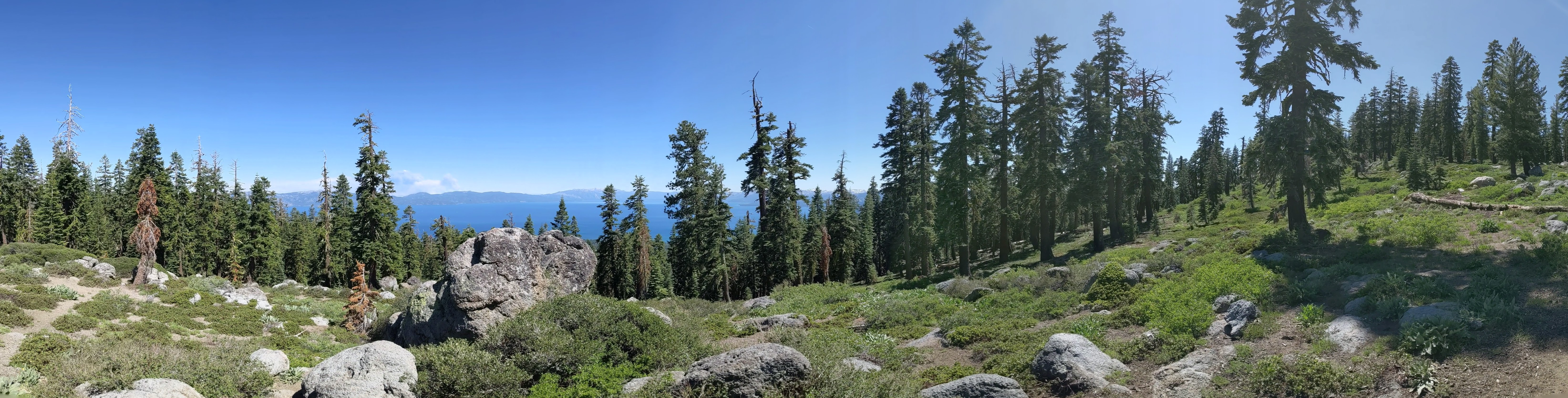
Panoramic view from near the top of Mount Watson
