= Auburn Public Library =

Auburn Public Library may refer to:

- Auburn Public Library (California)
- Auburn Public Library (Maine)
- Auburn Public Library (Washington)
