= List of sanghas in Central Valley, California =

This is a list of sanghas in Central Valley, California, including the Sacramento metropolitan area.

== List ==
Name	School of Buddhism	Founder/Date	Location
Buddhist Church of Florin	Jōdo Shinshū (Pure Land Buddhism)	1919	Sacramento
Buddhist Church of Fowler	Jōdo Shinshū (Pure Land Buddhism)	N/A	Fowler
Buddhist Church of Lodi	Jōdo Shinshū (Pure Land Buddhism)	1929	Lodi
Buddhist Church of Parlier	Jōdo Shinshū (Pure Land Buddhism)	1931	Parlier
Buddhist Church of Sacramento	Jōdo Shinshū (Pure Land Buddhism)	1899	Sacramento
Buddhist Church of Stockton	Jōdo Shinshū (Pure Land Buddhism)	1906	Stockton
Chagdud Gonpa, Chico	Tibetan Buddhism (Nyingma)	N/A	Chico
Davis Shambhala Center	Tibetan Buddhism	N/A	Davis
Fresno Buddhist Temple	Jōdo Shinshū (Pure Land Buddhism)	1899	Fresno
Fresno Cambodian Buddhist Society	Cambodian Buddhism (Khmer Theravada)	N/A	Fresno
Gedatsu Church of America	Shugendou	N/A	Sacramento
Holy Vajrasana Temple and Retreat Center	Tibetan Buddhism	N/A	Sanger
Khandro Ling	Tibetan Buddhism	1998	Sacramento
Khanh An Monastery	Vietnamese Buddhism	Before 2010	Galt
Kim Quang Temple	Vietnamese Buddhism	1978	Sacramento
Lion's Roar Dharma Center	Tibetan Buddhism	1992	Sacramento
Marysville Buddhist Church	Jōdo Shinshū (Pure Land Buddhism)	1908	Marysville
Middlebar Buddhist Monastery	Unknown	N/A	Stockton
Nichiren Buddhist Church	Nichiren Shu	N/A	Sacramento
Northern California Koyasan Temple	Shingon Esoteric Buddhism	1970 (merger of two older organizations dating back to 1920 and 1940 respectively)	Sacramento
Placer Buddhist Church	Jōdo Shinshū (Pure Land Buddhism)	N/A	Penryn
Quang Nghiem Buddhist Temple (Vietnamese Buddhist Association)	Vietnamese Buddhism	N/A	Stockton
Reedley Buddhist Church	Jōdo Shinshū (Pure Land Buddhism)	1936	Reedley
Sacramento True Buddha Temple	Fusion of Taoism, Sutrayana Buddhism and Vajrayana Buddhism	2008	Sacramento
Walnut Grove Buddhist Church	Jōdo Shinshū (Pure Land Buddhism)	1906	Walnut Grove
Wat Brahmacariykaram	N/A	N/A	Fresno
Wat Dhammararam	Cambodian Buddhism (Khmer Theravada)	1982	Stockton
Wat Khmer	Cambodian Buddhism (Khmer Theravada)	2011	Lodi
Wat Lao Buddharangsy	Lao Buddhism	N/A	Ceres
Wat Lao Dhammasacca	Lao Buddhism	N/A	Fresno
Wat Lao Saoputh	Lao Buddhism	N/A	Sacramento
Wat Phouthapathane Lao	Lao Buddhism	N/A	Fresno
Wat Sacramento Buddhavanaram	Thai Buddhism (Dhammayuttika Nikaya)	2001	Sacramento
Valley Streams Zen Sangha	Zen Buddhism	N/A	Sacramento
Visalia Buddhist Church	Jōdo Shinshū (Pure Land Buddhism)	N/A	Visalia
Zanabazar Dharma Center	Mongolian Buddhism	2009	Sacramento
