= Jake's on the Lake =

Restaurant in Tahoe City, California

- Interactive map of Jake's on the Lake

Restaurant information
- Established: 1978
- Location: 780 North Lake Boulevard, Tahoe City, California
- Coordinates: 39.1724°N 120.137°W
- Website: www.jakestahoe.com

Jake's on the Lake is a restaurant in Tahoe City, California, United States. It was established in 1978 by T S Restaurants and was sold to Chris Thibaut in 2005. The restaurant overlooks Lake Tahoe and primarily serves seafood.

== History ==
Jake's on the Lake was established in 1978 by Sandy Saxten and Robert Thibaut, the second restaurant part of T S Restaurants. In 1978, Boatworks Mall was built, the current location of the restaurant. In 2005, Robert Thibaut's brother, Chris Thibaut, purchased Jake's on the Lake, and Scott Yorkey was hired as the head chef. In 2012, access was allowed through the Tahoe City Marina and it was reported a bike path was "soon–to–be–completed". The lease expired in late 2025 and the restaurant closed on November 1, largely due to more seasonal demand. The restaurant reopened for the last summer in 2026.

== Cuisine ==
Jake's on the Lake serves Californian and Hawaiian dishes and seafood.
