= Auburn Fire House No. 1 =

- U.S. National Register of Historic Places
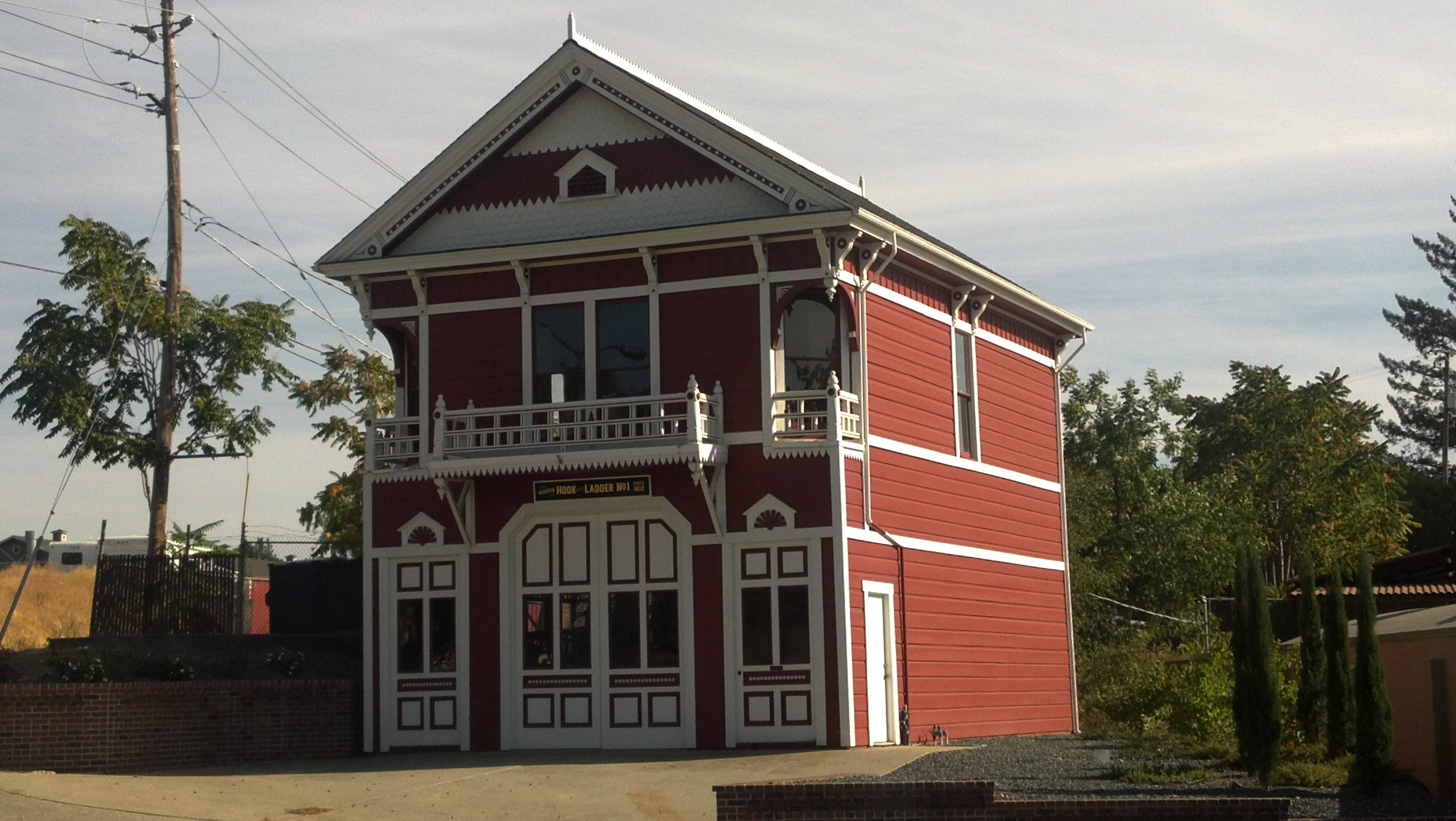

- Location within California Location within the United States
- Location: El Dorado St. & Lincoln Way, Auburn, California
- Coordinates: 38°54′14″N 121°03′59″W
- Area: less than one acre
- Built: 1888
- Architect: Davis, John; Hoffman, Frank
- Architectural style: Stick/Eastlake, Queen Anne
- MPS: Auburn, CA MPS
- NRHP reference No.: 11000936
- Added to NRHP: December 19, 2011

Auburn Fire House No. 1, also known as Auburn Hose Company No. 1, at El Dorado St. & Lincoln Way in Auburn, Placer County, California, was built in 1888. It was listed on the National Register of Historic Places in 2011.

It includes elements of Stick/Eastlake and Queen Anne styles.

The station was rededicated in a ceremony in 2013, at its 125th year mark, after a decade of restoration by volunteers.

== See also ==
- Auburn City Hall and Fire House
- Auburn Fire House No. 2
- National Register of Historic Places listings in Placer County, California
