= Chapel of the Transfiguration (Tahoe City, California) =

- U.S. National Register of Historic Places
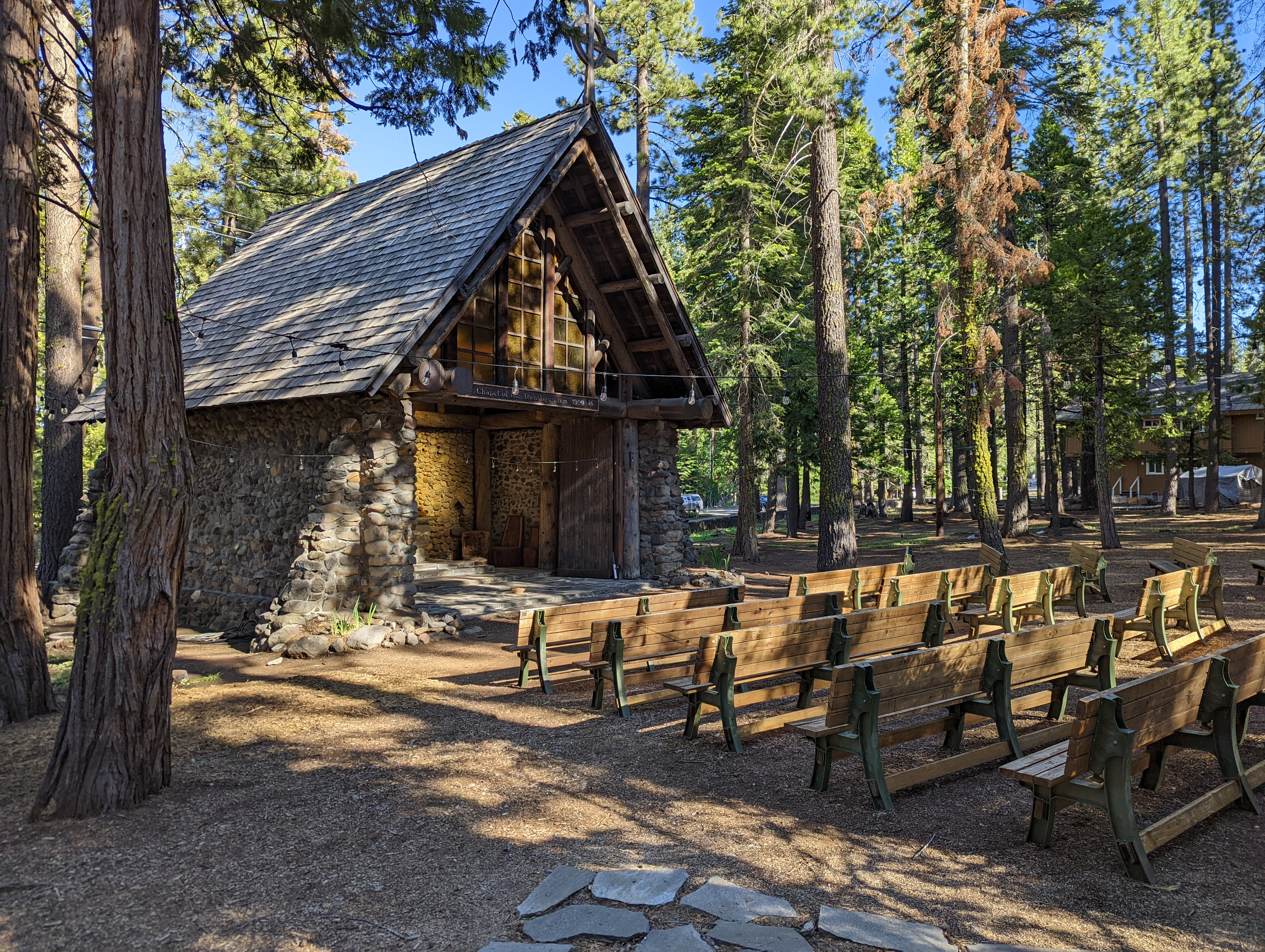
- Chapel of the Transfiguration

- Location within California
- Location: 855 W. Lake Blvd., Tahoe City, California
- Coordinates: 39°09′12″N 120°08′50″W
- Built: 1909
- Architectural style: Bungalow/craftsman
- NRHP reference No.: 11000534
- Added to NRHP: August 18, 2011

The Chapel of the Transfiguration in Placer County, California, also known as Saint Nicholas Episcopal Church Outdoor Chapel, was built in 1909. It is associated with Robert Montgomery Ward and Robert Howard Watson, perhaps as builders or architects. It was listed on the National Register of Historic Places in 2011.

It is an outdoor chapel, rustic or Craftsman in appearance, apparently constructed of rough granite and wood. It is located at 855 Westlake Blvd. at Sequoia, in Tahoe City, California.

The outdoor benches have been replaced a few times.
