= Auburn Fire House No. 2 =

- U.S. National Register of Historic Places
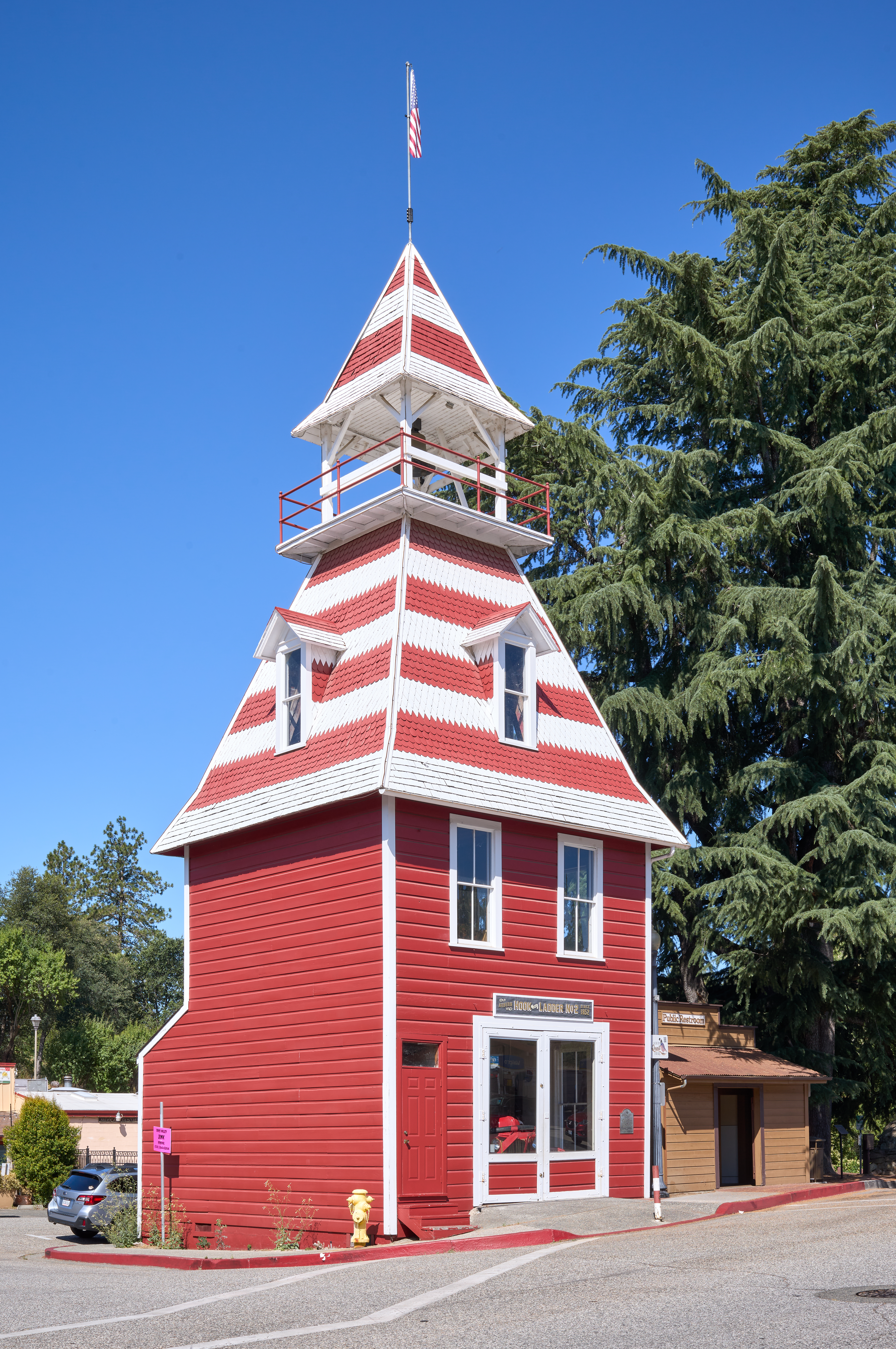
- Fire House No. 2 (2025)

- Location within California
- Location: Corner of Washington, Main, & Commercial Sts., Auburn, California
- Coordinates: 38°53′45″N 121°04′50″W
- Area: less than one acre
- Built: 1891
- Architectural style: Shingle Style
- MPS: Auburn, CA MPS
- NRHP reference No.: 11000937
- Added to NRHP: December 19, 2011

Auburn Fire House No. 2, also known as Auburn Hose Company No. 2, at the corner of Washington, Main, & Commercial Streets in Auburn, Placer County, California, was built in 1891. It was listed on the National Register of Historic Places in 2011.

Architecture: Shingle Style

== See also ==
- Auburn City Hall and Fire House
- Auburn Fire House No. 1
- National Register of Historic Places listings in Placer County, California
