= Auburn City Hall and Fire House =

- U.S. National Register of Historic Places
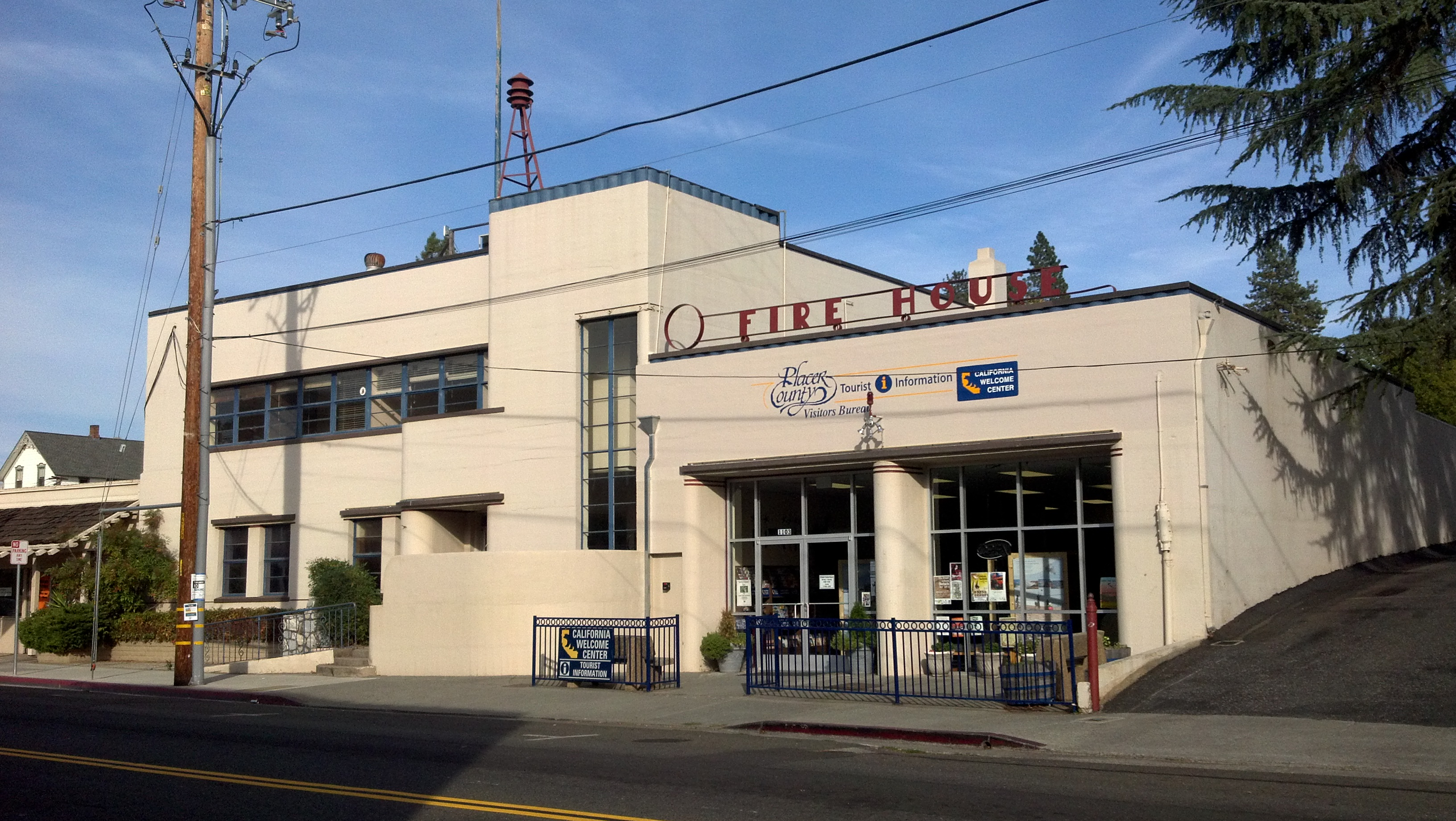

- Location within California
- Location: 1103 High St., Auburn, California
- Coordinates: 38°53′54″N 121°04′13″W
- Area: less than one acre
- Built: 1935-37
- Architect: George C. Sellon
- Architectural style: Moderne
- MPS: Auburn, CA MPS
- NRHP reference No.: 11000935
- Added to NRHP: December 19, 2012

The Auburn City Hall and Fire House, at 1103 High St. in Auburn, California, is a Moderne-style fire station and city hall which was built in 1935. It was listed on the National Register of Historic Places in 2012.

It was designed by George Clinton Sellon, the first State Architect of California. It was built during 1935-37 as a Works Progress Administration project.

It has also hosted the Boys & Girls Club Auburn.

In 2018, it holds the Placer County Visitors Bureau/California Welcome Center.

== See also ==
- Auburn Fire House No. 1
- Auburn Fire House No. 2
- National Register of Historic Places listings in Placer County, California
