= Mountain Quarries Bridge =

- U.S. National Register of Historic Places
- California Historical Landmark
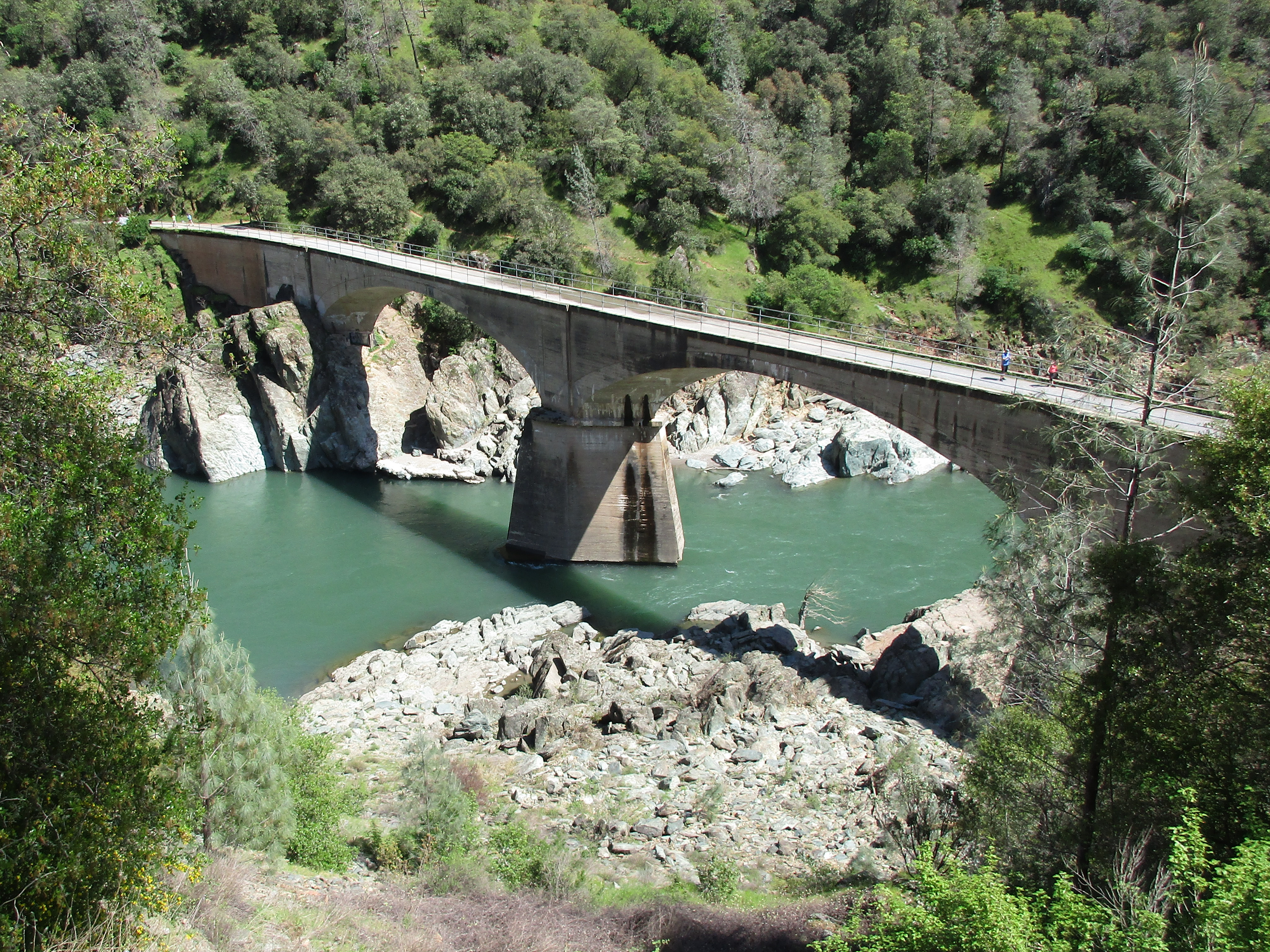

- Location within California Location within the United States
- Nearest city: Auburn, California
- Coordinates: 38°54′46″N 121°2′25″W
- Area: less than one acre
- Built: 1912
- Built by: Leonard, John B.; et al.
- Architectural style: Concrete Arch Bridge
- NRHP reference No.: 04000014
- CHISL No.: 1051

Significant dates
- Added to NRHP: February 11, 2004
- Designated CHISL: April 7, 2014

The Mountain Quarries Bridge is a railroad bridge across the North Fork American River, near Auburn, spanning between El Dorado and Placer counties. It is a concrete arch bridge that was built in 1912 to transport quarried rock.

== Names ==
The Mountain Quarries Bridge has also been known as the Mountain Quarry Cement Bridge, the American River Quarry Bridge, the Pacific Portland Cement Company Railroad Bridge, the Auburn Concrete Arch Bridge, and the No Hands Bridge.

== National Register of Historic Places ==
The Mountain Quarries Bridge was listed on the National Register of Historic Places in 2004.

According to its 2002 NRHP nomination — the bridge "although massive, ...is plain in appearance yet possesses a gracefulness that is in perfect harmony with its rugged surroundings."

== See also ==
- Bridges on the National Register of Historic Places in California
- National Register of Historic Places listings in Placer County, California
