= Auburn Public Library (California) =

- U.S. National Register of Historic Places
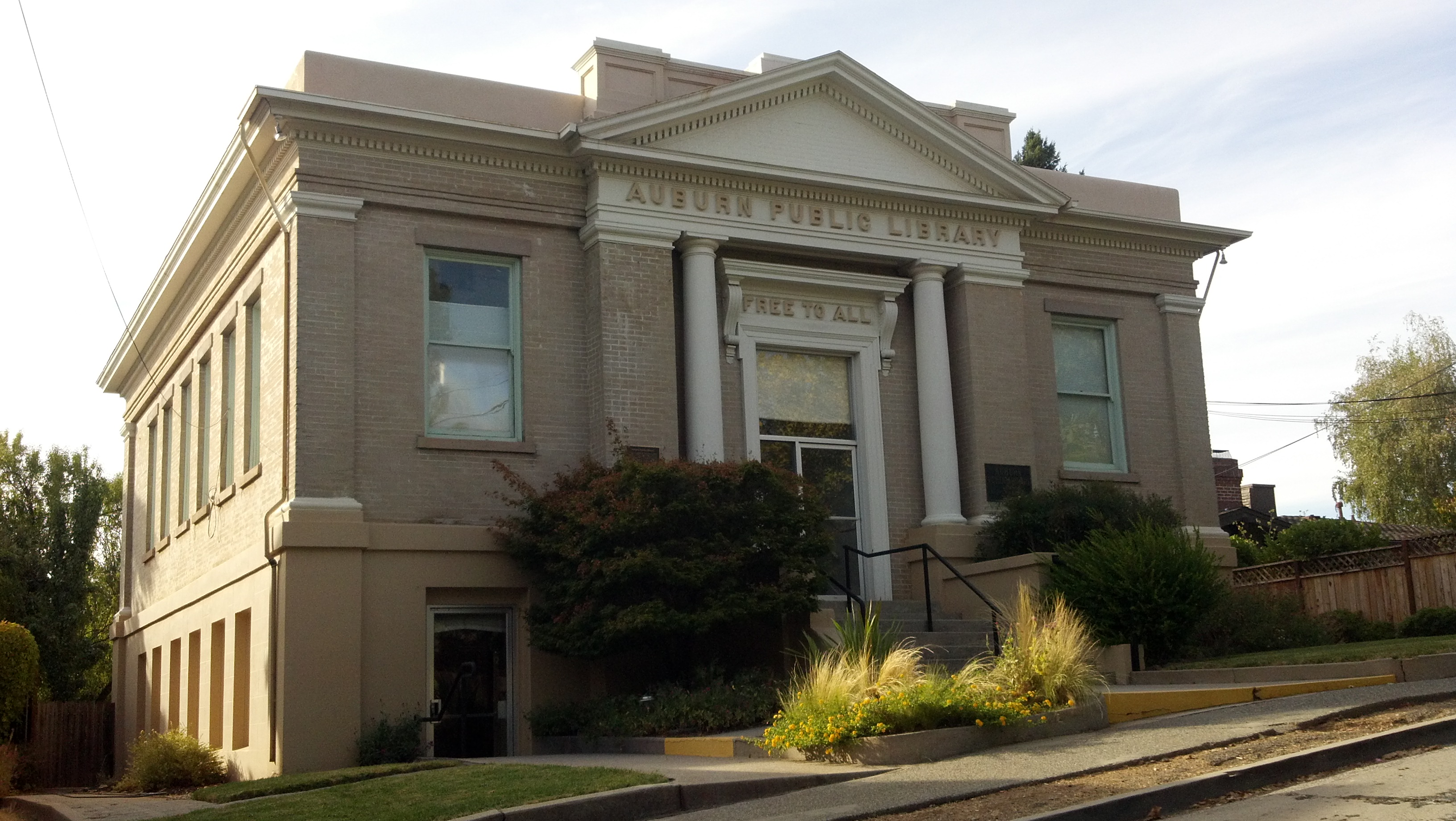

- Location within California Location within the United States
- Location: 175 Almond St., Auburn, California
- Coordinates: 38°53′59″N 121°04′19″W
- Built: 1909
- Architectural style: Neoclassical
- MPS: Auburn, CA MPS
- NRHP reference No.: 11000153
- Added to NRHP: March 31, 2011

The Auburn Public Library, also known as Old Auburn Library, is located at 175 Almond Street in Auburn, Placer County, California.

The Neoclassical style building was completed in 1909.

It was listed on the National Register of Historic Places on March 31, 2011.

The current Auburn Public Library is part of the Placer County Library system, and is located at 350 Nevada Street, Auburn, Placer County, California.

== See also ==
- National Register of Historic Places listings in Placer County, California
