= Watson Log Cabin =

Historic house in California, United States

- U.S. National Register of Historic Places
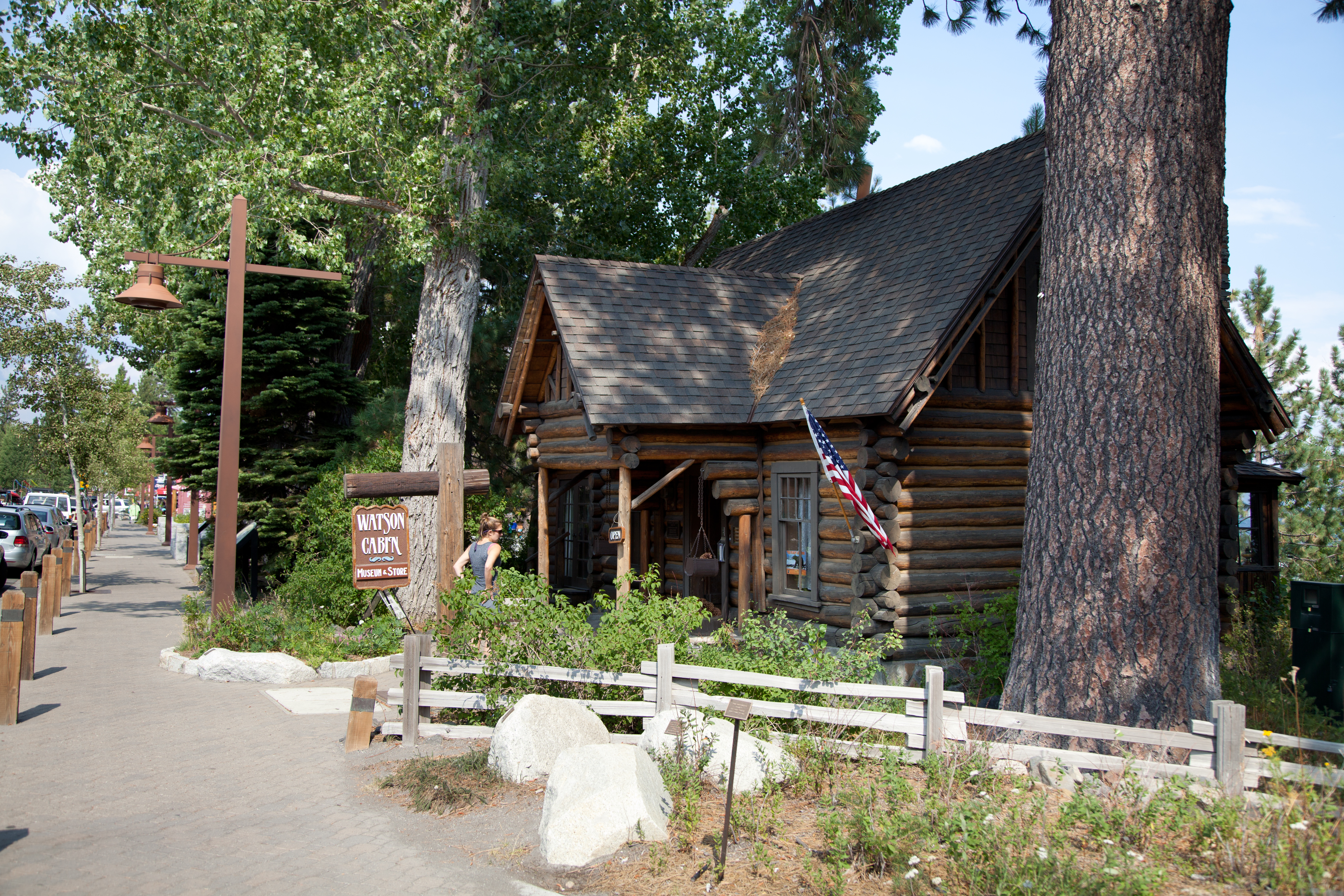

- Location within California Location within the United States
- Location: 560 N. Lake Blvd, Tahoe City, California
- Coordinates: 39°10′17″N 120°8′20″W
- Area: 0.1 acres (0.040 ha)
- Built: 1908
- Built by: Robert Montgomery Watson
- Architectural style: Log house
- NRHP reference No.: 79000518
- Added to NRHP: August 24, 1979

Watson Log Cabin in Tahoe City, California, was built in 1908 by Robert Montgomery Watson. It was listed on the National Register of Historic Places in 1979.

It is the only historic log cabin in the Tahoe City area.

The cabin is now owned by the North Lake Tahoe Historical Society and is open to the public seasonally.

Watson Creek and Watson Lake, just north of Lake Tahoe, are also named for R. M. Watson.

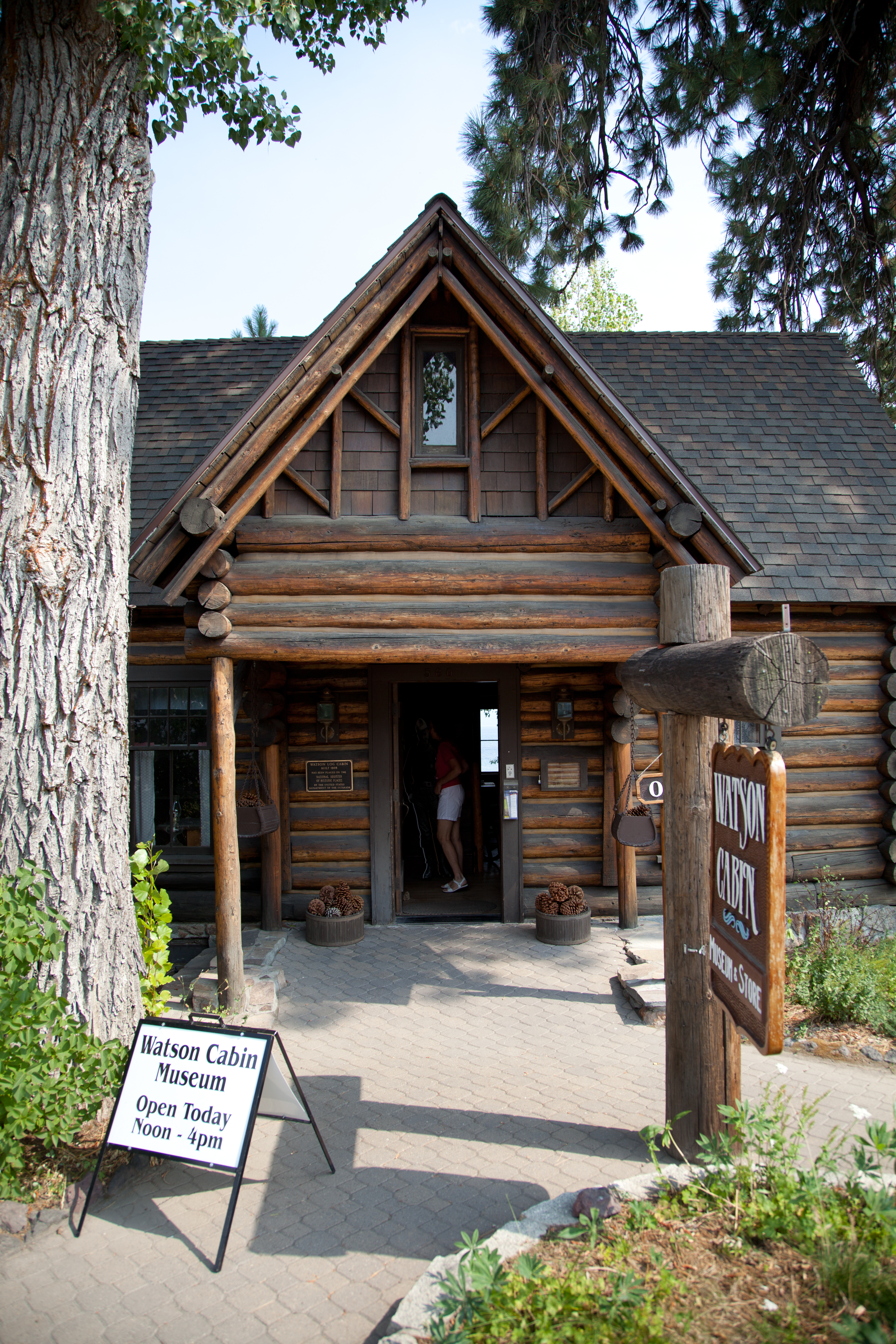

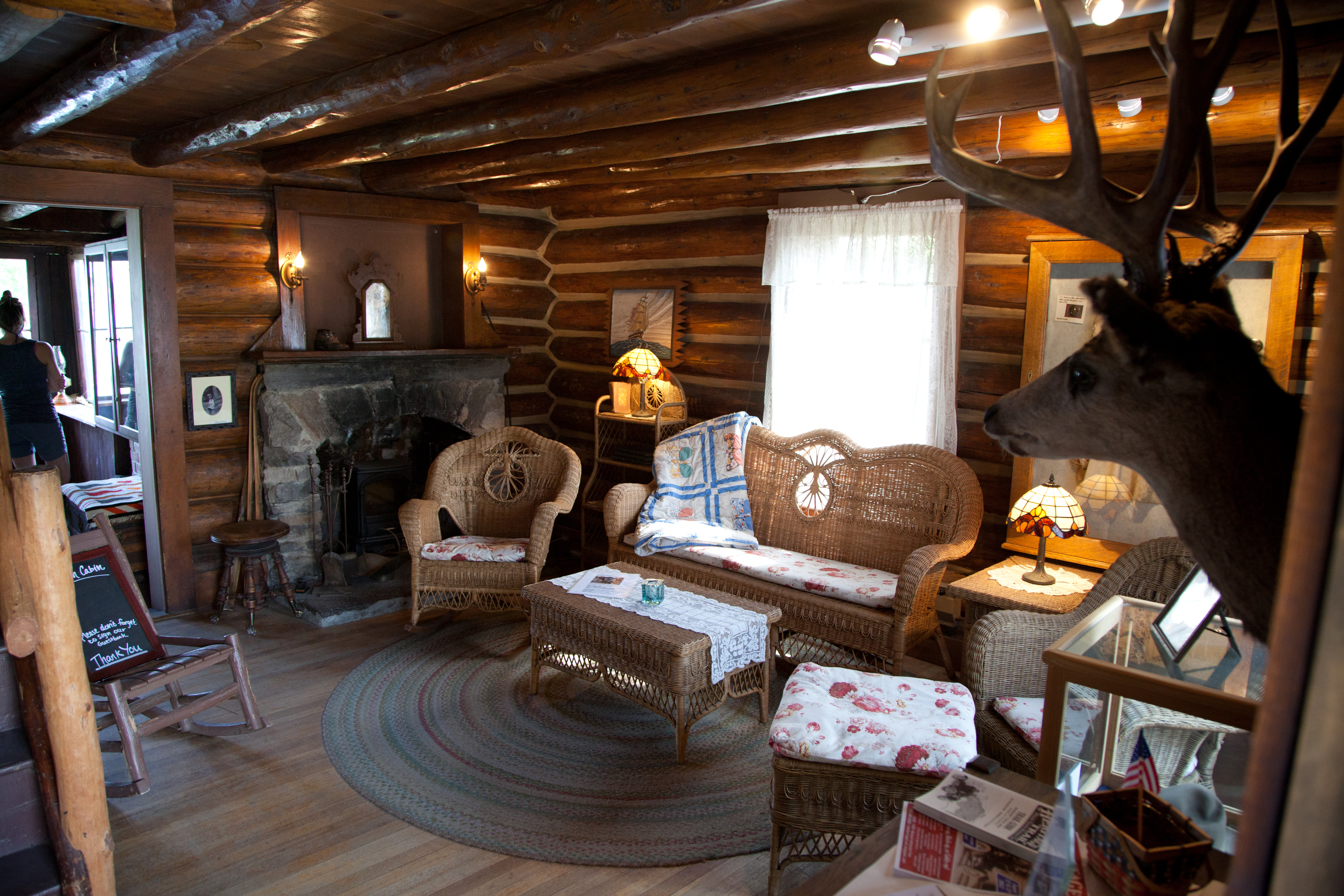

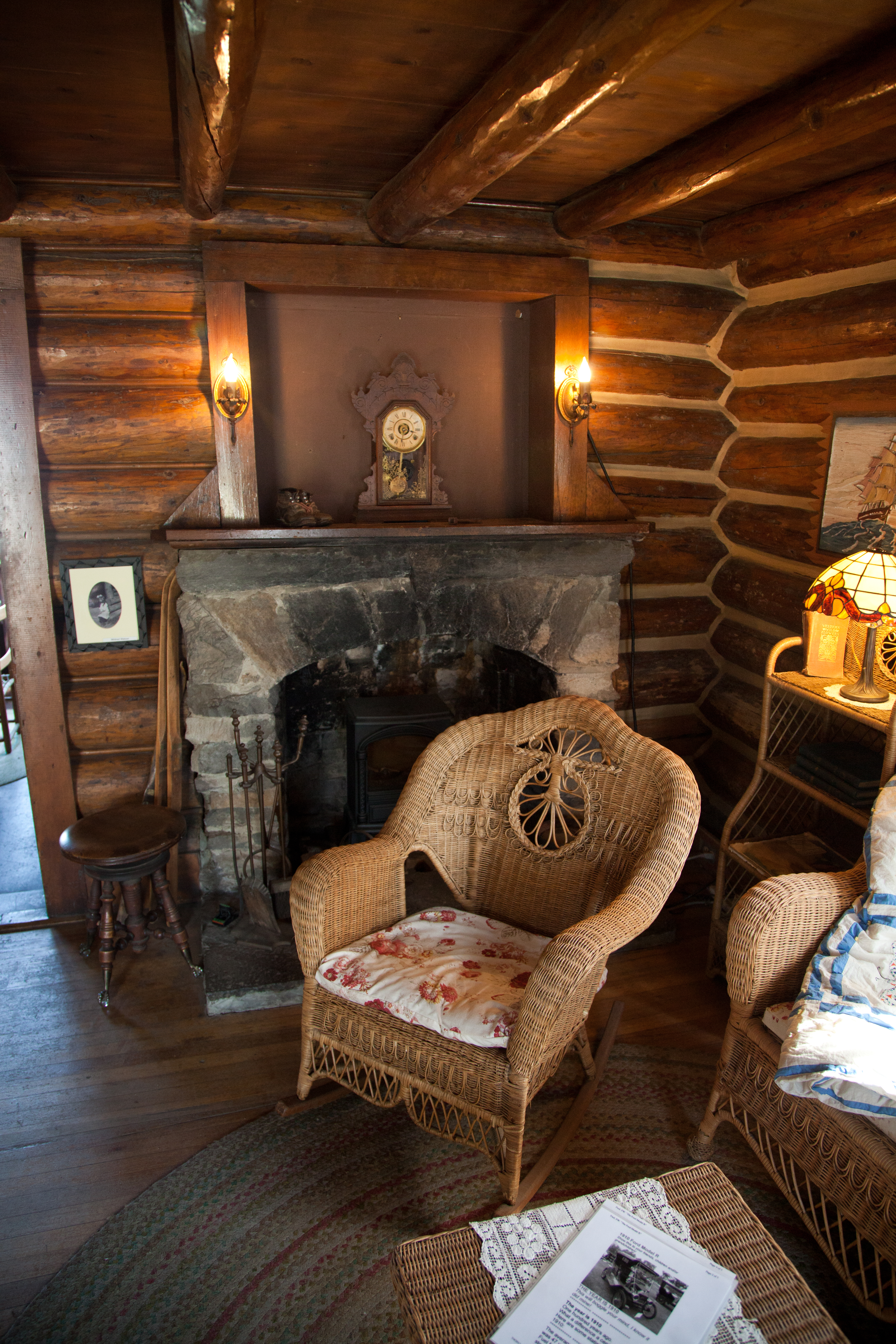

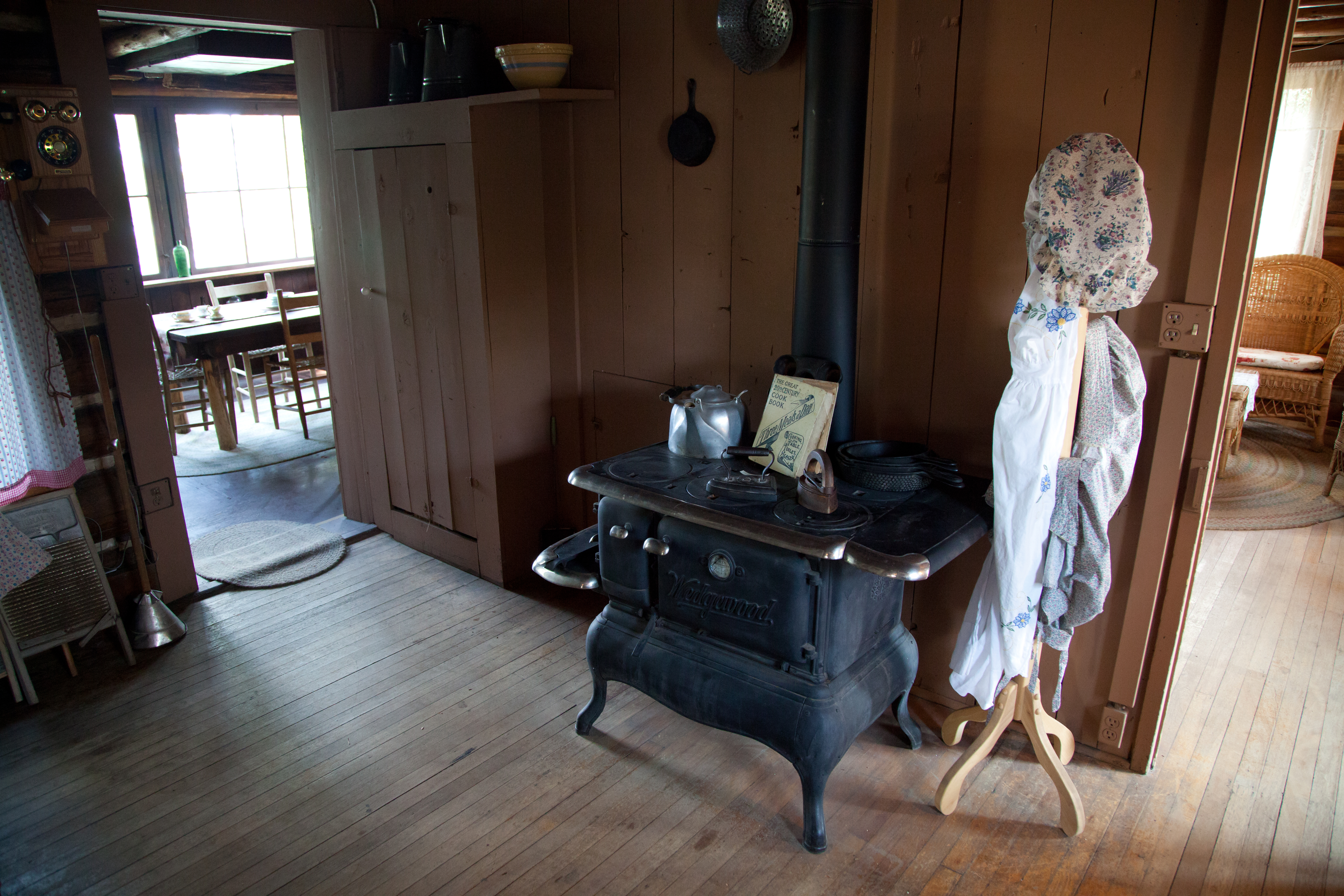

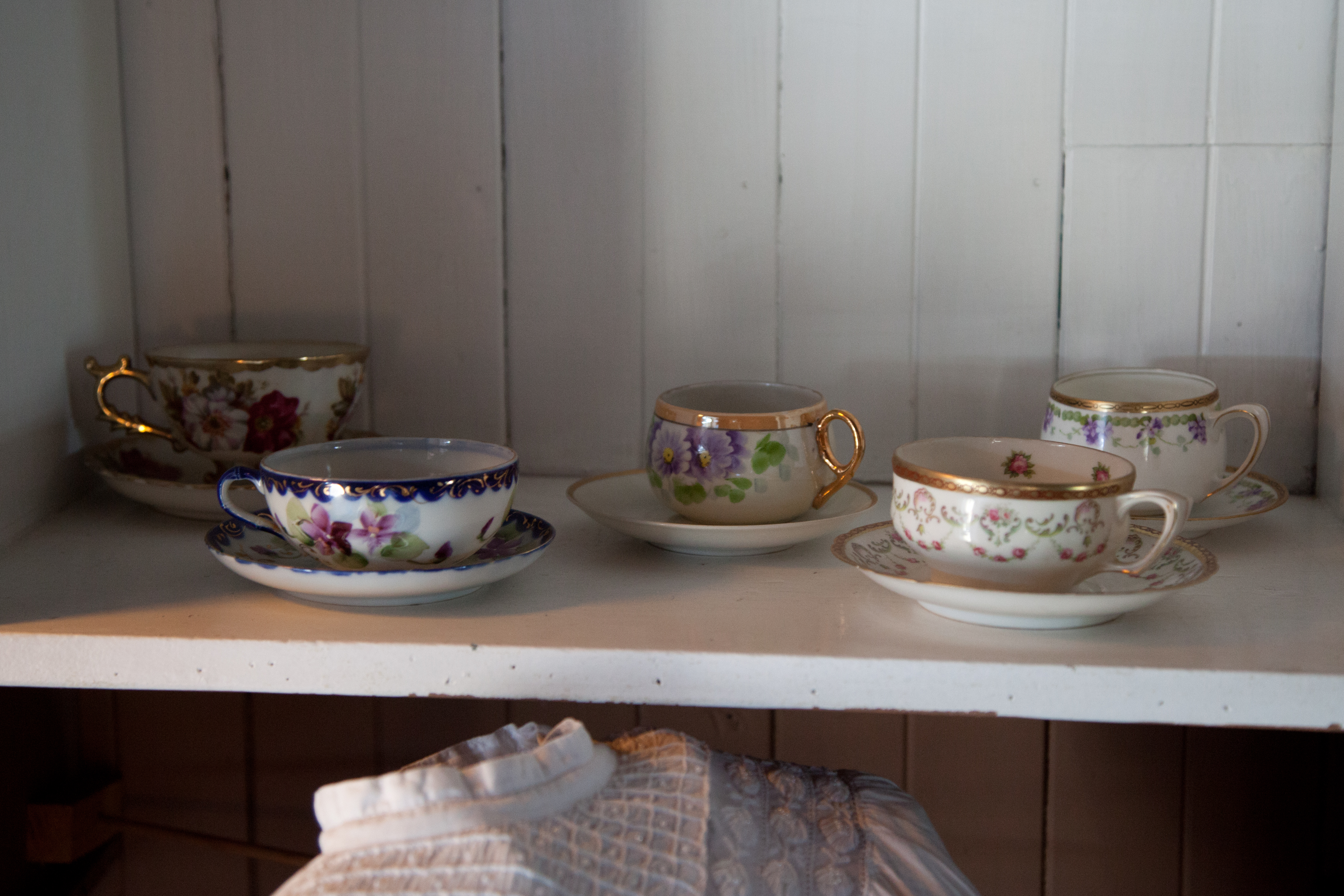

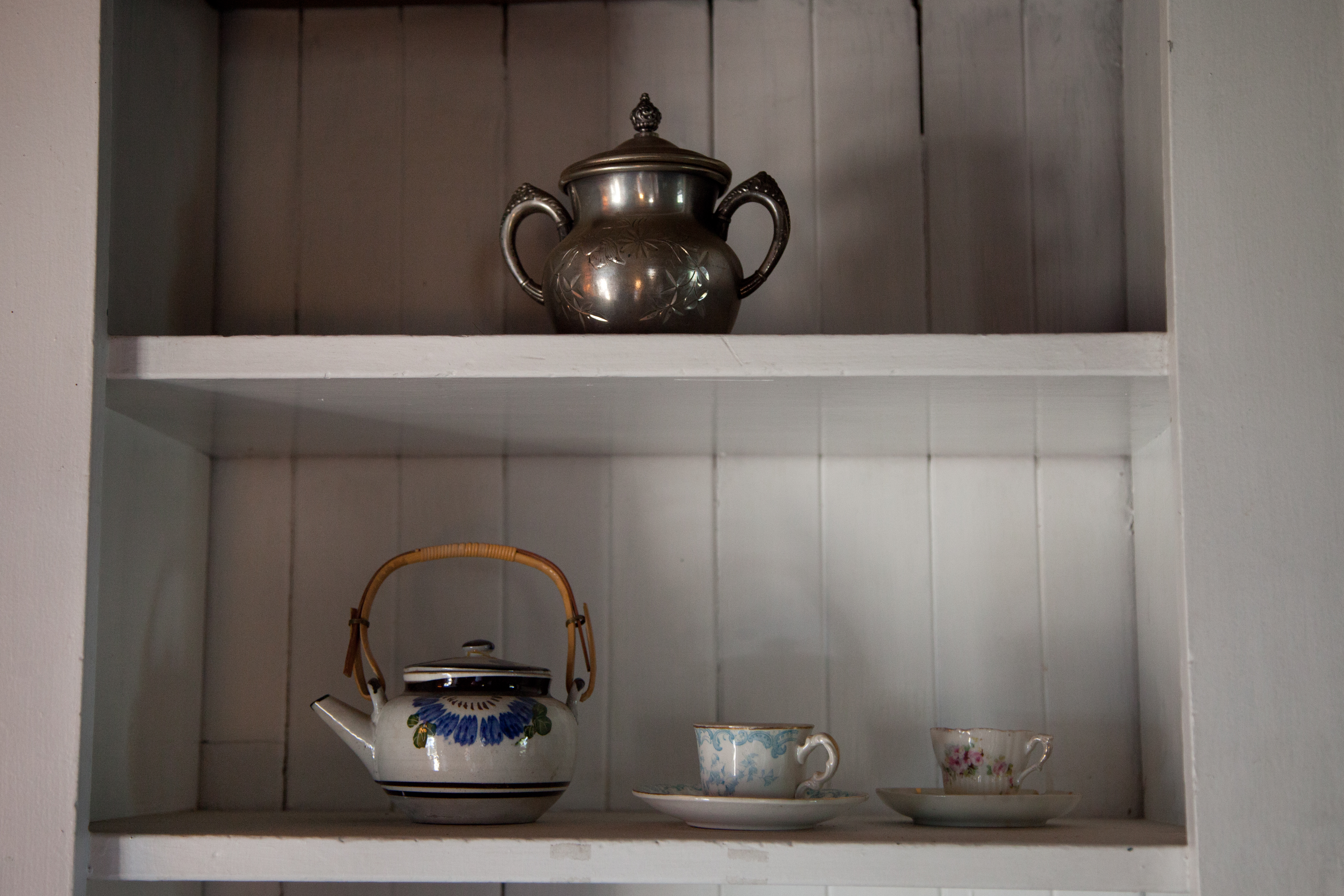

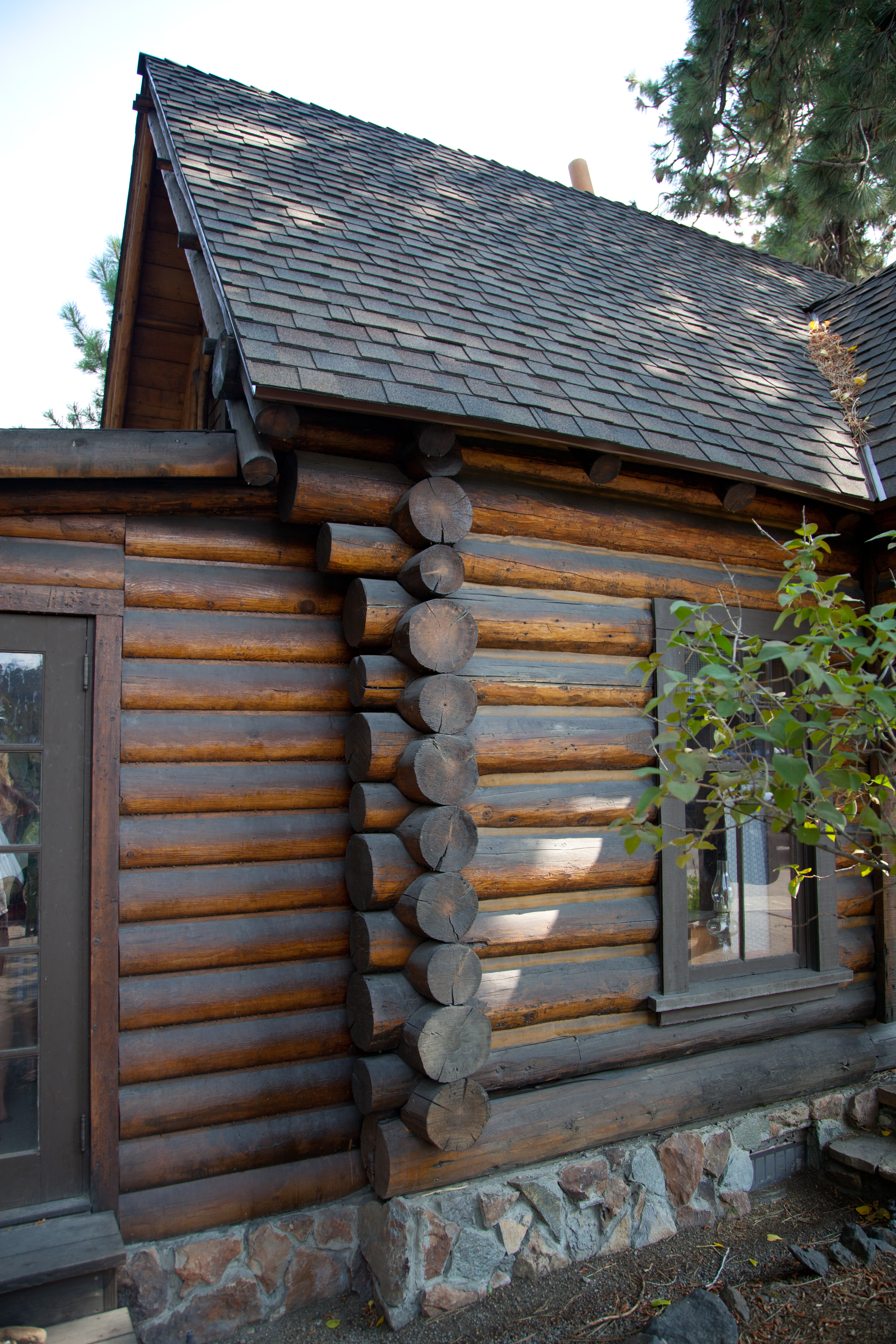

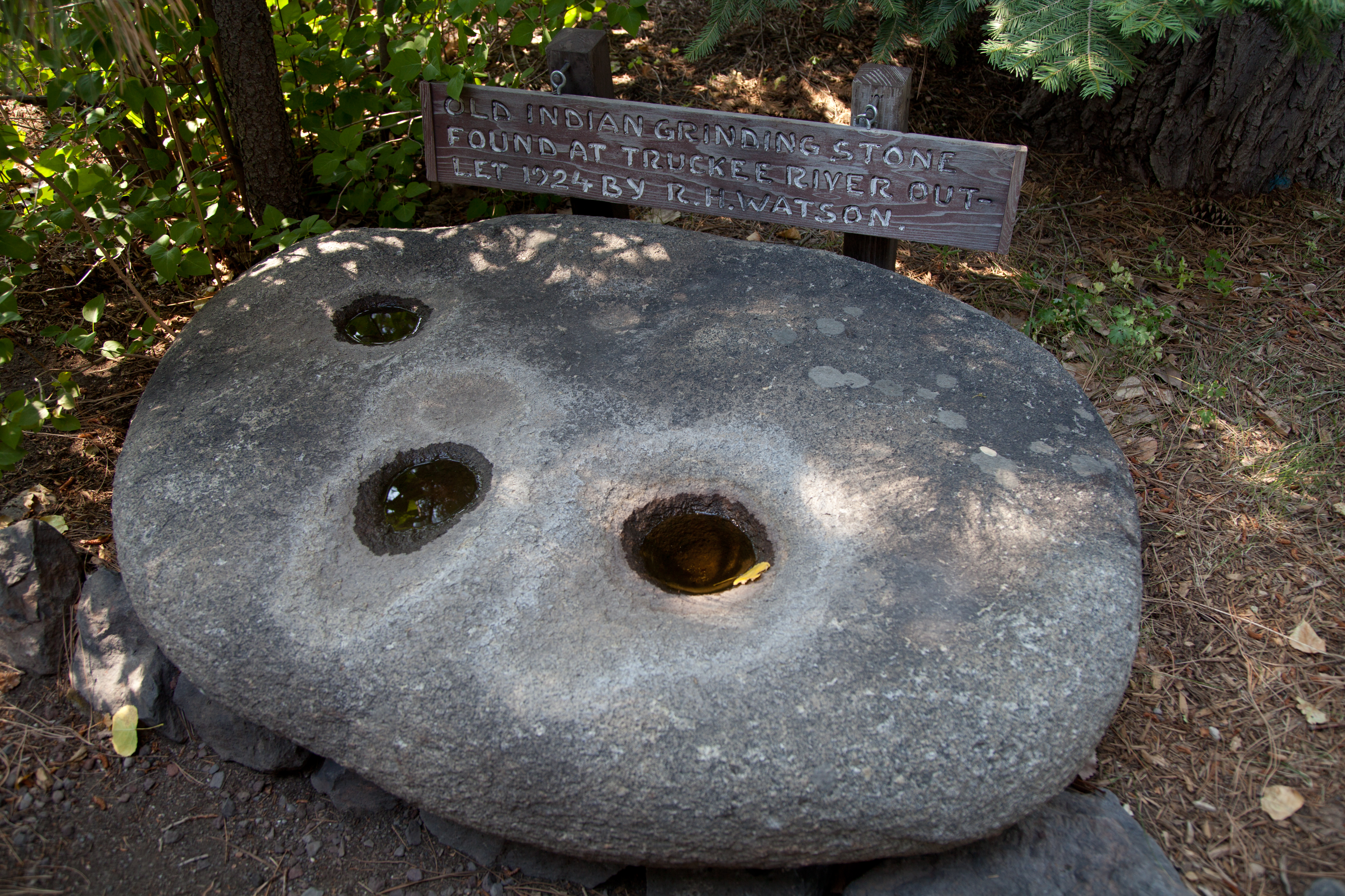

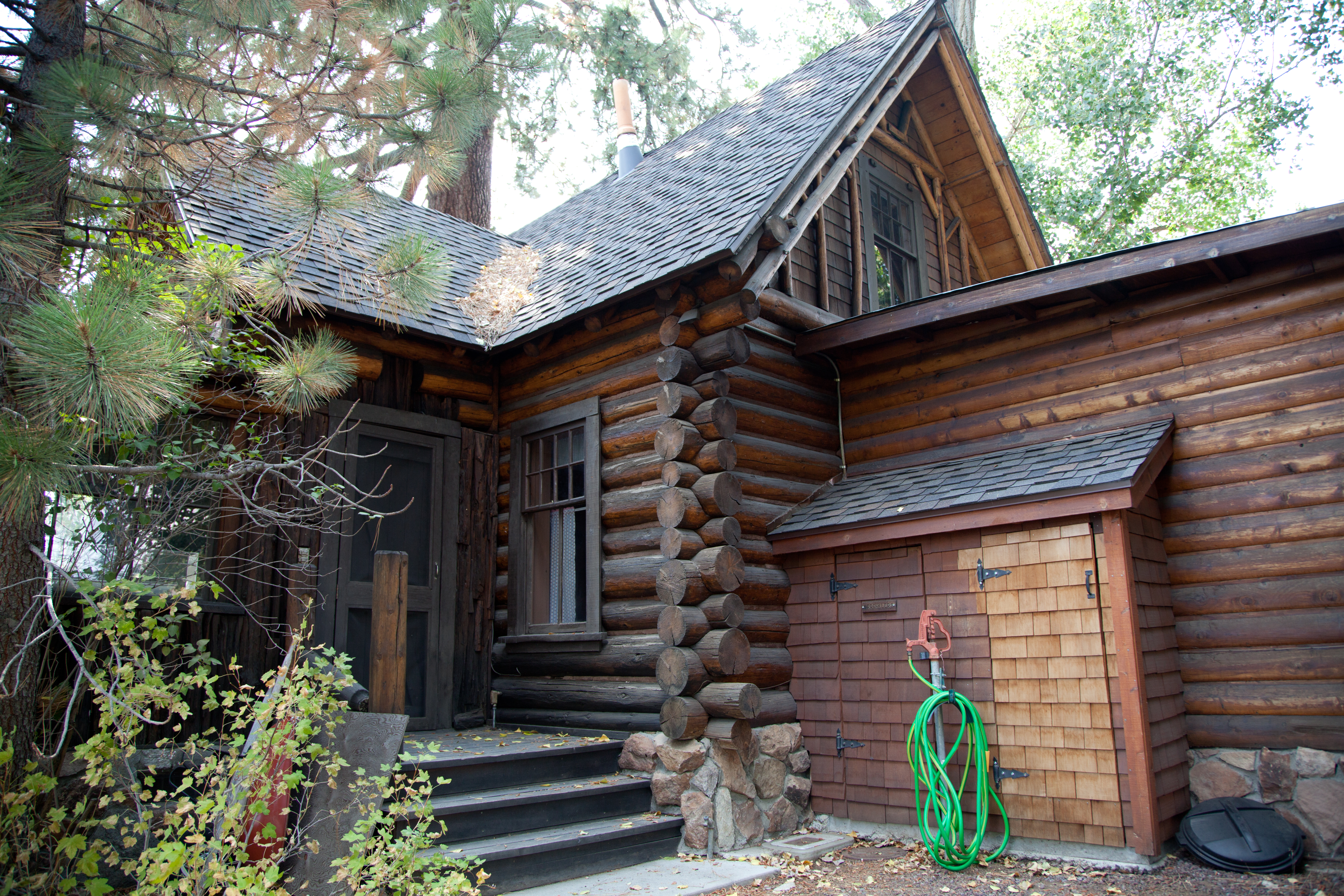
