= Griffith Griffith (Penryn) =

American businessman and California town founder

Griffith Griffith (1823–1889) was the founder of Penryn, California, and the proprietor of the Penryn granite quarries.

== Biography ==
Griffith Griffith was born December 8, 1823, at Ty Gwyn, Llanllyfni, Carnarvonshire, North Wales, the son of David and Mary (Roberts) Griffith. David Griffith was a superintendent of a large slate quarry. He died young leaving seven children. Griffith, being 14 years old, performed hard, back-breaking labor on the farm for the next five years to help his mother who was burdened by heavy taxes and high rents. At the age of 19, he went to work at the slate quarry in Penrhyn where his father had worked, and soon became a foreman over 30 men.

In June 1847, Griffith immigrated to the United States. His first jobs were with quarry companies in Massachusetts and Connecticut. After hearing about the great quantities of gold in California, Griffith decided to try his luck as a miner. Upon landing in San Francisco on April 14, 1853, he went straightaway to Coloma where gold was first discovered. Later he went to Mormon Island and Negro Hill hoping for better luck. Along the banks of the South Fork of the American River, the experienced quarryman viewed the immense boulders and bedrock granite as showing promise of a vocation more suitable to his talents and more profitable than that of a gold miner. His experience with granite impressed businessmen, and soon Griffith obtained contracts for his own business. He thus became the pioneer of granite for building purposes in California.

== California Granite Company ==
In 1853, Griffith established his first quarry at Big Gulch, which was near Mormon Island and Folsom. The granite there was used for all buildings of importance in the State, such as the Adams & Co.’s Express, Sacramento, and fortifications at Fort Alcatraz and Fort Point in San Francisco. The granite was shipped by rail from Folsom to Sacramento over the recently completed Sacramento Valley Railroad, California's first railroad.

== Wildwood Quarry ==
With the extension of the Sacramento Valley Railroad, which was the Sacramento, Placer, and Nevada Railroad, Griffith moved his operations to Wildwood Station, seven miles (11 km) north from Folsom in what is now Granite Bay, California. It was opened on July 16, 1862, the first quarry in Placer County. Demand for the cut granite in the San Francisco Bay Area and elsewhere was steadily increasing and these early railroads made delivery of massive granite tonnage relatively easy. From Wildwood Station, granite from Griffith's quarry would be loaded onto train cars and taken to Folsom, where it would be transferred to the train cars of the Sacramento Valley Railroad. The train would then travel 22 1/2 miles (36.2 km) to Sacramento, and there the granite would be transferred onto barges or boats for the final leg of the journey to the San Francisco Bay Area. This was quite a laborious process, but a profitable one for Griffith, who supplied rough granite between 1862 and 1864.

The railroad was largely responsible for the success of the Wildwood Quarry, but with the passage of the Pacific Railroad Act in June 1862 and the subsequent construction of the Central Pacific Railroad across the Sierra and eastward, much of the usefulness of the Sacramento, Placer, and Nevada Railroad was over. It continued business sporadically until June 1864 when the Central Pacific Railroad was finally completed up to Newcastle. Abruptly, the rails were taken up and the bankrupt Sacramento Valley and Sacramento, Placer, and Nevada railroads were no more. To continue in the quarry business, Griffith would have to find another granite site closer to the Central Pacific Railroad.

== Penryn Granite Works ==
Griffith was most fortunate to find a new granite outcropping north of Rocklin and south of Newcastle. He named his site Penryn after the Penrhyn Quarry in Wales. Small houses, a stone office, and a barn were erected. A rail linking the quarry to the Central Pacific Railroad a mile and a half away enabled loaded cars from the quarry to be sent down to the station by gravity. Then, teams of oxen hauled up the empty flat cars. This crucial rail extension, along with the completion of the Transcontinental Railroad, opened the entire United States for Griffith Griffith's granite business.

=== Penryn Granite ===
The Penryn granite was so pure because the location was nearly in the center of the granite belt, making the stone a "superior" quality—meaning it was entirely free of iron. Without iron, granite never changes color from atmospheric effects, or even when polished, does not corrode its perfect surface. It was mottled in white and black in equal proportions, with larger spots than that of granite from quarries nearer to the edges of the granite zone. There were other types of granite at the quarry. "One of these was a beautiful black granite. When polished, the granite served as beautiful columns and ornaments which can be seen in most of the important business buildings and private mansions in California".

Samples of the several kinds of granite were sent to the Centennial Exposition, and were pronounced to be "the best in the world" with reference to being free from iron, and thus, assured not to stain or abrade. This fact was brought to the attention of the officials of the Interior Department, Washington, D.C., whose duty it was to report upon the building materials of the United States. They wrote to Griffith requesting samples, and he responded. By 1870, the Penryn Quarry was known throughout Northern California for its high quality of granite. It became one of the most successful manufacturing businesses in the county due to Griffith's ability to secure many lucrative supply contracts.

=== Polishing mill ===
In 1874, Penryn Granite Works erected a polishing mill, the first and only one of its kind in the state. A 440-horsepower (330 kW) steam engine, weighing ten tons, gave the energy for polishing stone. The polishing mill enabled circular columns and pillars to be manufactured to decorate buildings. Polished urns could also be produced.

Business continued to boom. "There were 125 men employed at Griffith's quarry in 1879, and Mr. Griffith had just contracted to furnish granite for the James Flood mansion at San Francisco".

=== The end of Penryn Granite Works ===
Griffith Griffith died in 1889; his nephew, David Griffith, took over the business. However, David was more interested in the booming fruit orchard business and shipping industry than he was in pursuing granite contracts. In addition, the use of other materials such as concrete was increasing. Eventually, he was doing nothing more than producing headstones for graves while mostly managing his fruit orchards in the area. When David died in 1918, the Penryn Granite Works closed. David's only child, Enid Griffith, died in 1976 and left the company's office building and the adjacent quarry land to Placer County for use as a museum and park. The original stone building is still standing and serves as the quarry museum. Enid Griffith is buried in the family plot in Auburn, California, along with her great-uncle, Griffith Griffith, founder of Penryn and the granite works.

== Bibliography ==
- Brown, Douglas, "G. Griffith: His Work in Granite." (August 28, 2004, 2nd Edition) (n.p.)
- Davis, Leonard M., Penryn: A Village Locked in Time. (Penryn: Friends of the Griffith Quarry, 1995), pp. 5–24, 100–101.
- Griffith, Enid S., A Small Town Reaches Out: The Origin and Early History of Penryn, Placer County, California. (Penryn, CA, 1957, reprinted by the Roseville Historical Society for Friends of the Griffith Quarry, 2002).
- Hall, Carroll D., "Penryn--The Green Years." (March 21, 1980, unpublished manuscript)
- Angel, Myron, History of Placer County, California, with Illustrations and Biographical Sketches of its Prominent Men and Pioneers (Oakland, CA, Thompson & West, 1882), pp. 395–396, illustrations p. 396 & p. 400.
