= Auburn Masonic Temple (Auburn, California) =

- U.S. National Register of Historic Places
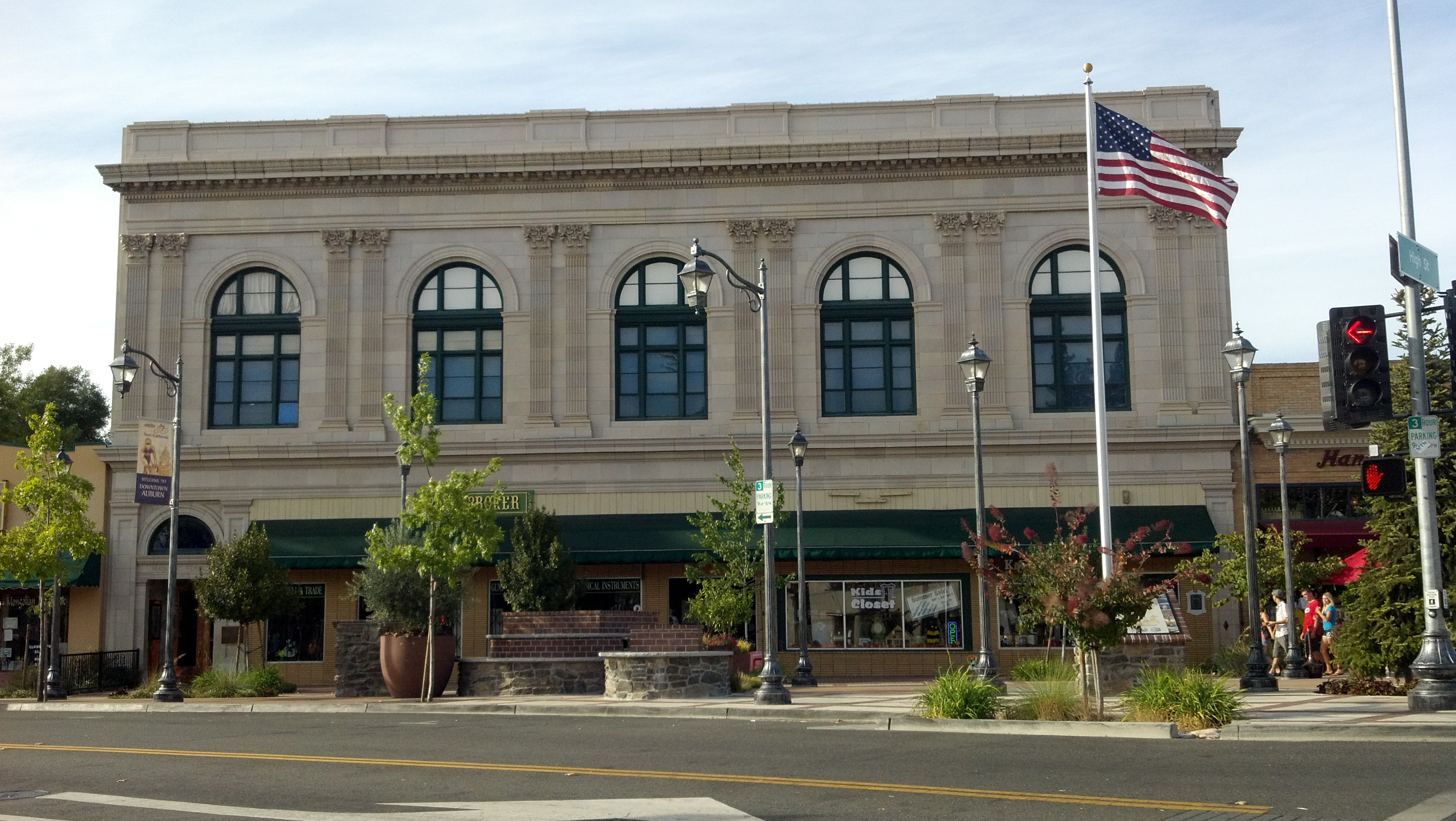

- Location within California Location within the United States
- Location: 948 Lincoln Way, Auburn, California
- Coordinates: 38.89892°N 121.07083°W
- Built: 1914-1915
- Architect: Allen D. Fellows; builder Herdal Brothers of Auburn
- NRHP reference No.: 11000939
- Added to NRHP: December 19, 2011

The Auburn Masonic Temple, also known as the Auburn Masonic Hall and the John H. Robinson Memorial Masonic Temple, is an historic two-story Masonic building located at 948 Lincoln Way on the Central Square in Auburn, California. In 1913 Eureka Lodge No. 16, Free and Accepted Masons, chartered in 1851, bought two adjoining one-story redbrick commercial buildings on this site for $17,000 and commissioned architect Allen D. Fellows to add a second-story to them with a unified facade with an entrance to the second floor placed in on the left side of the first floor street front. Fellows designed the expansion in the Beaux-Arts style of architecture with brick walls and a terracotta facade and it was built in 1914-1915 by Herdal Brothers of Auburn and dedicated on April 25, 1916. The terracotta was supplied by Gladding, McBean and Company which is still in existence. The first floor, which once housed a J. C. Penney store, continues to be used for retail and office space while the second floor continues to be used by Eureka Lodge and other Masonic-related bodies. On December 19, 2011, the building was added to the National Register of Historic Places.
