= Penryn, California =

Penryn
- census-designated place
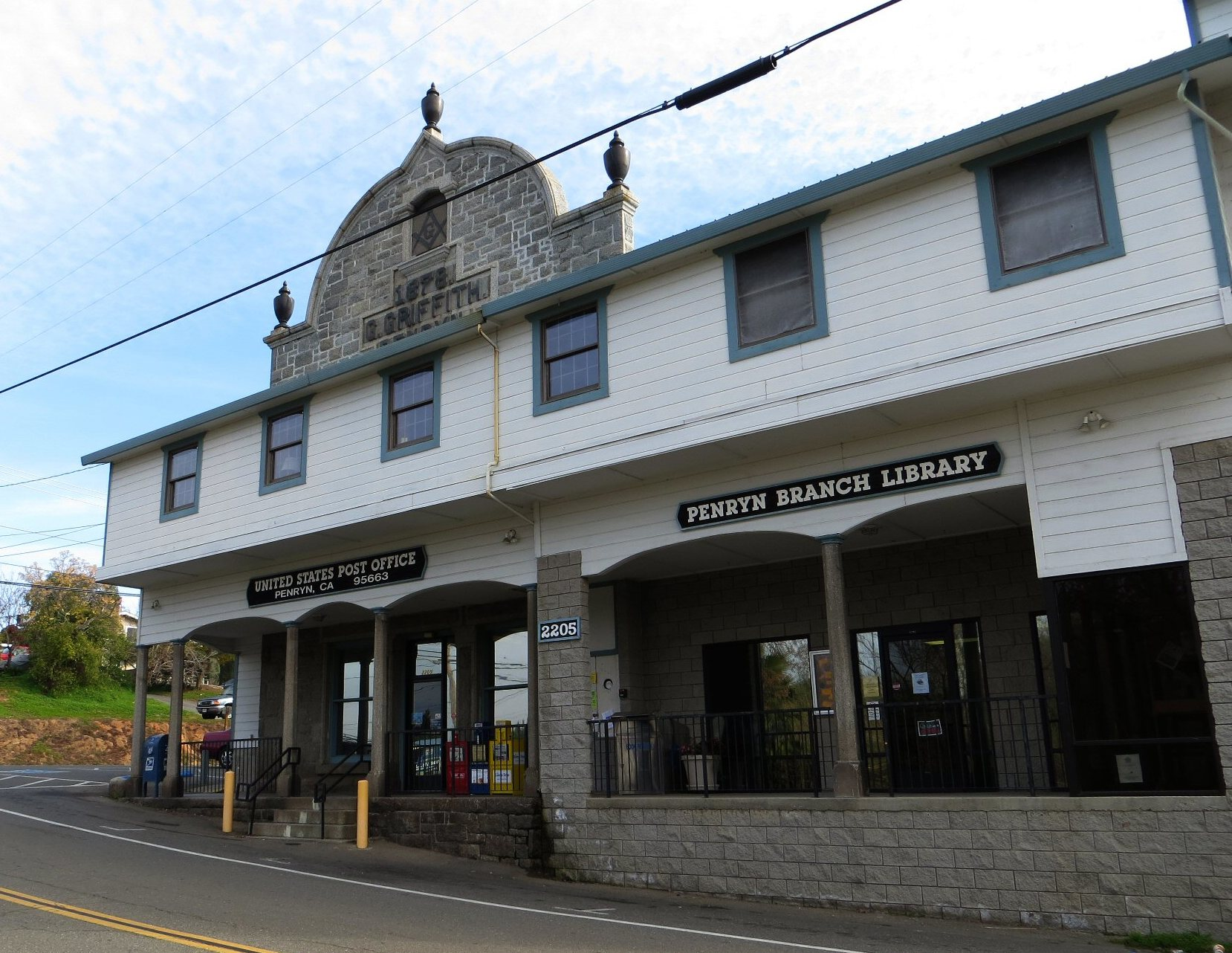

- Position in California.
- Coordinates: 38°50′54″N 121°10′11″W
- Country: United States
- State: California
- County: Placer

Area
  - Total: 1.903 sq mi (4.93 km^{2})
  - Land: 1.903 sq mi (4.93 km^{2})
  - Water: 0 sq mi (0 km^{2}) 0%
- Elevation: 627 ft (191 m)

Population (2020)
  - Total: 1,150
  - Density: 604/sq mi (233/km^{2})
- Time zone: UTC-8 (Pacific (PST))
  - Summer (DST): UTC-7 (PDT)
- ZIP Code: 95663
- Area codes: 916, 279
- GNIS feature IDs: 2628774

Penryn is a census-designated place in Placer County, California, in the United States. Geographic location is 38°51′08″N 121°10′06″W. Penryn is located 5.5 miles (8.9 km) northeast of Rocklin. The population was 1150 at the 2020 census.

== History ==
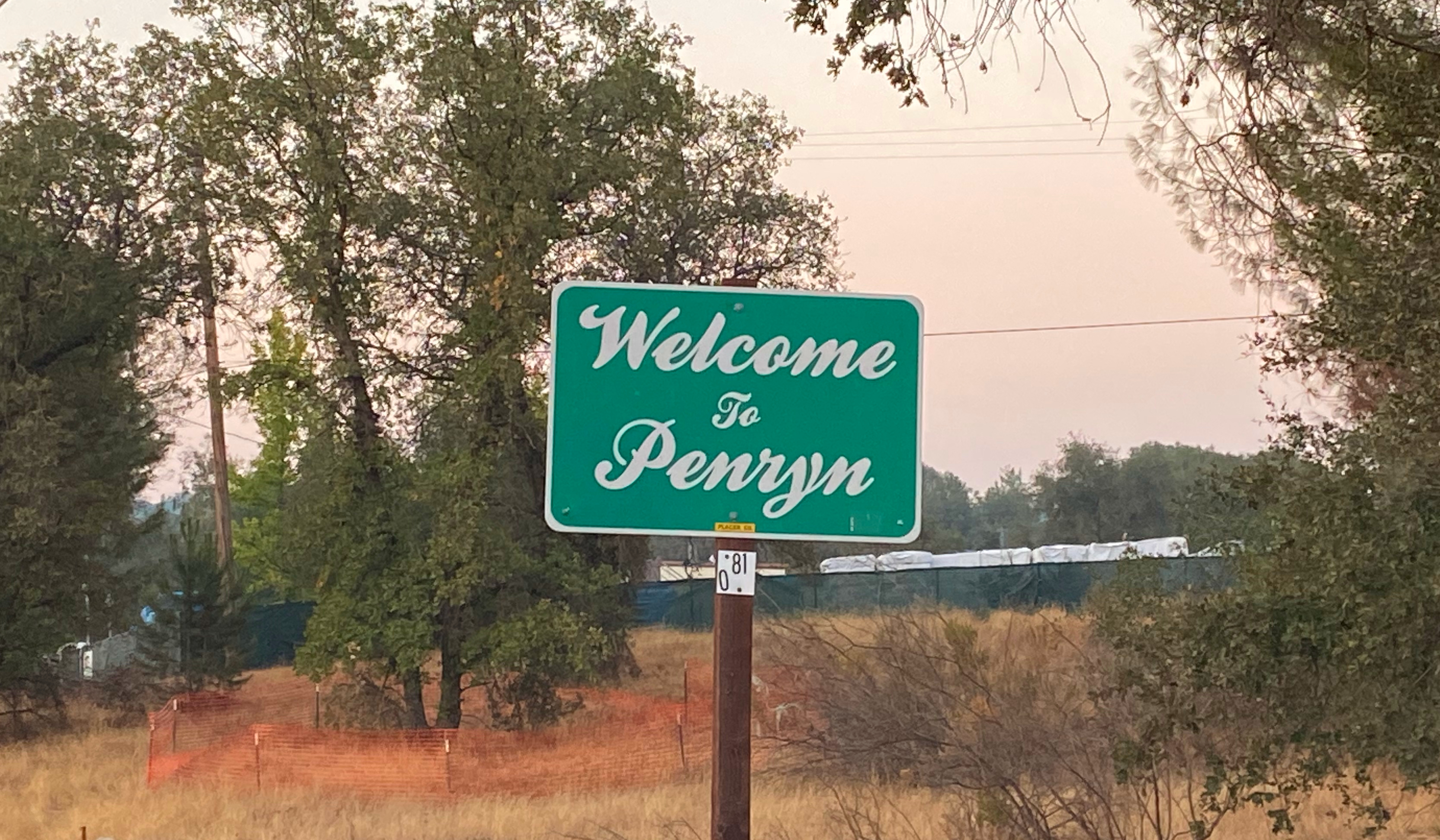
"Welcome to Penyrn" sign

What became Penryn began in late 1864 when a Welsh immigrant named Griffith Griffith established a granite quarry on quarter section of land leased from the Central Pacific Railroad. A siding was completed on February 6, 1865, and the first load of cut stone was shipped less than a week later. The quarry was open for business, but as yet, had no name. The railroad, matter-of-factly, designated the siding "Griffith’s Granite Station", but Griffith had something else in mind.

Back home in North Wales, Griffith, like his father before him, worked in the Penrhyn Slate Quarry. In Welsh, the word penrhyn translates to headland or promontory, which aptly described the seaport from which the Penrhyn Quarry took its name. When it came to naming his new enterprise, the choice was obvious, but not the spelling. To simplify things and avoid the inevitable misspellings that were likely to occur, on the evening of May 17, 1865, Griffith, after discussing the matter with Central Pacific legal counsel Edwin Bryant Crocker (known later for the Crocker Art Museum), agreed to drop the “h” from the original Welsh spelling and settled on the name, and spelling, we know today. The following day, Griffith recorded this auspicious event in his diary: "Concluded last night with Judge Crocker to call this quarry Penryn."

The quarry now had a name, but not the town, because there was no town, just the granite works and a railroad siding. Griffith's employees all lived in the immediate area, so there were plenty of people, but no businesses outside of what amounted to a small "company store" near the quarry. The nearest supply centers of any consequence were Newcastle and Smithville, near present-day Loomis. Griffith's early ledgers record numerous transactions at both places.

It was in 1869 that Griffith's mercantile monopoly came to an end. That year, a large frame building housing a railroad depot, store and saloon, went up on the West side of the Central Pacific mainline, just South of today's English Colony Way. In time, other businesses followed, but this single event marked the beginnings of what would soon evolve into the town of Penryn.

From the beginning, there was never any doubt or debate as to what the new town would be called. However, most references, prior to 1870, generically applied the name “Griffith’s Quarry” or “Griffith’s Granite Quarry” to the area that included the small, embryonic village, which clearly indicates no name had yet been officially assigned to the place. That finally happened in May 1871, when Penryn was designated a voting precinct by the County of Placer. And the most official recognition of all came in June 1873 with the establishment of a U. S. Post Office.

By the mid-1870s Penryn was an established community with a fine new schoolhouse, a hotel, at least one blacksmith shop, two or three stores and an equal number of saloons. The granite works was going strong, at peak times employing over 200 men, and would continue so until Griffith Griffith's death in February 1889. It was then purchased by Griffith's nephew, David Griffith, and would continue to operate on a somewhat smaller scale, until the latter Griffith's death in 1918. By the mid-1890s however, fruit raising had edged-out granite quarrying as the area's leading industry.

It was David Griffith's daughter, Enid, the great-niece of Griffith Griffith, who left the quarry property to the people of the County of Placer when she died in 1976. In accordance with her wishes, the site of the Penryn Granite Works is now a 23-acre (93,000 m^{2}) park. The former quarry office building, erected in 1877, now houses the Griffith Quarry Museum, staffed by volunteers and open on weekends from noon until 4:00 pm or by appointment. Griffith Quarry was added to the National Register of Historic Places in 1977, and is also California Historical Landmark number 885.

Penryn granite is noted for its beauty and strength. Mottled in more-or-less equally sized specks of black and white, it appears a medium-to-dark gray in color, at first glance, but takes on an almost bluish-gray hue when viewed in a subdued light or, when wet or polished. This unique stone can be seen in the foundations and walls of a number of California landmarks including the California State Capitol and the United States Mint in San Francisco.

Joel Parker Whitney owned thousands of acres of land in the Penryn area in the late 19th century. In the early 1890s, about 1,000 California fan palms were planted along the boundaries of Whitney's Placer County Citrus Colony citrus farming venture, and many still stand along English Colony Road. These palm trees, otherwise out of place among the native Sierra foothill oak forest, are a signature of the area.

== Geography ==
According to the United States Census Bureau, the CDP covers an area of 1.9 square miles (4.9 km^{2}), all of it land.

== Transportation ==
Placer County Transit provides weekday commuter service to/from the Penryn Park and Ride to/from Downtown Sacramento.

== Demographics ==
Historical population
Census	Pop.	Note	%±
2010	831		—
2020	1,150		38.4%
U.S. Decennial Census; 2010

Penryn first appeared as a census designated place in the 2010 U.S. census.

=== 2020 census ===
As of the 2020 census, Penryn had a population of 1,150. The population density was 604.3 inhabitants per square mile (233.3/km^{2}). 69.8% of residents lived in urban areas, while 30.2% lived in rural areas.

The age distribution was 263 people (22.9%) under the age of 18, 80 people (7.0%) aged 18 to 24, 230 people (20.0%) aged 25 to 44, 327 people (28.4%) aged 45 to 64, and 250 people (21.7%) who were 65 years of age or older. The median age was 45.2 years. For every 100 females, there were 104.6 males, and for every 100 females age 18 and over there were 113.7 males age 18 and over.

The whole population lived in households. There were 425 households, out of which 126 (29.6%) had children under the age of 18 living in them, 268 (63.1%) were married-couple households, 18 (4.2%) were cohabiting couple households, 90 (21.2%) had a female householder with no spouse or partner present, and 49 (11.5%) had a male householder with no spouse or partner present. 84 households (19.8%) were one person, and 45 (10.6%) were one person aged 65 or older. The average household size was 2.71. There were 324 families (76.2% of all households).

There were 439 housing units at an average density of 230.7 units per square mile (89.1 units/km^{2}), of which 425 (96.8%) were occupied and 14 (3.2%) were vacant. Of occupied units, 372 (87.5%) were owner-occupied, and 53 (12.5%) were occupied by renters. The homeowner vacancy rate was 0.8% and the rental vacancy rate was 0.0%.

Racial composition as of the 2020 census
Race	Number	Percent
White	897	78.0%
Black or African American	8	0.7%
American Indian and Alaska Native	17	1.5%
Asian	31	2.7%
Native Hawaiian and Other Pacific Islander	3	0.3%
Some other race	43	3.7%
Two or more races	151	13.1%
Hispanic or Latino (of any race)	117	10.2%
