= Tahoe City, California =

Unincorporated community in California, United States

Tahoe City
- Unincorporated community
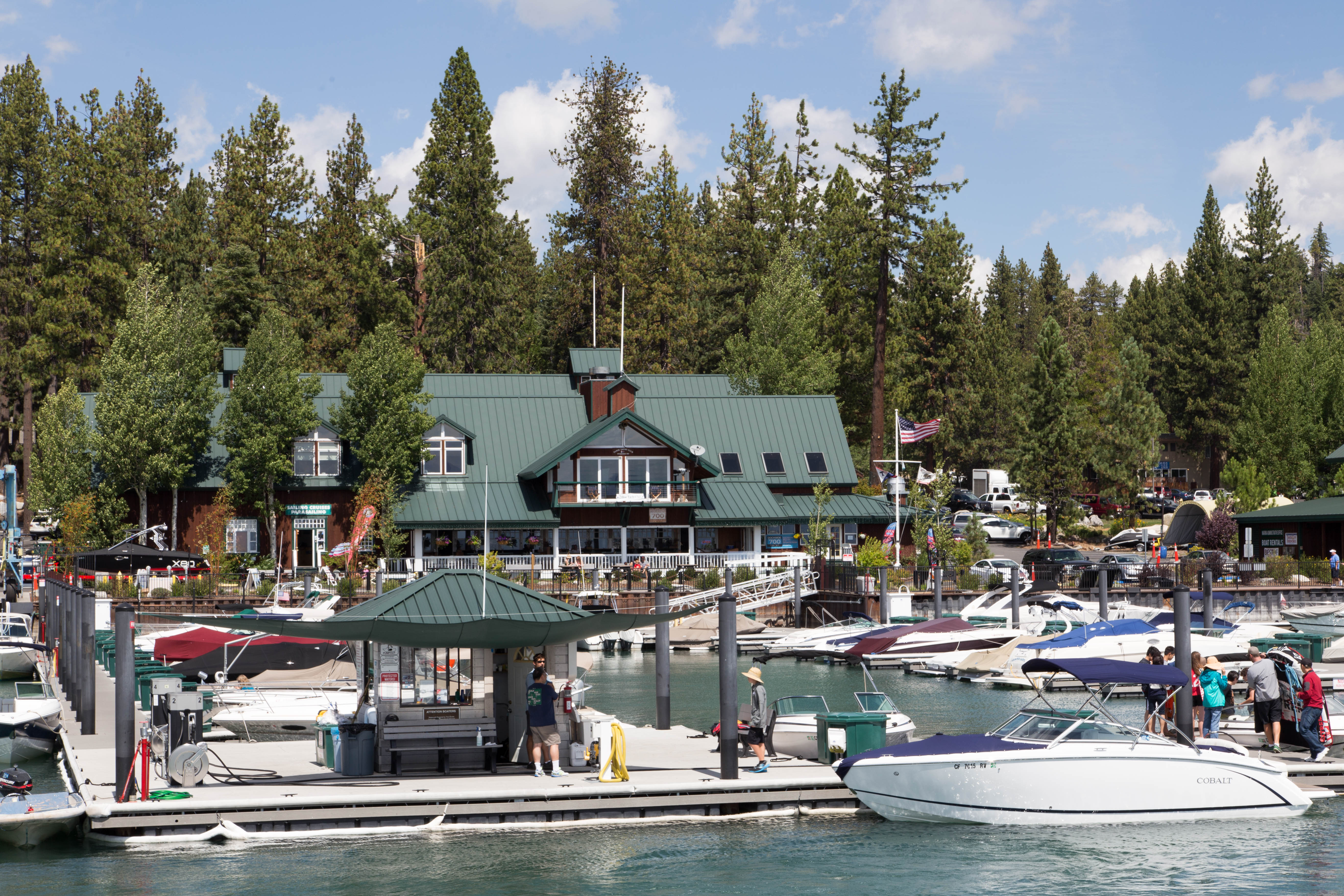
- Tahoe City waterfront

- Location in California
- Coordinates: 39°10′20″N 120°08′20″W
- Country: United States
- State: California
- County: Placer County
- Elevation: 6,250 ft (1,905 m)
- Climate: Dsb

Tahoe City (formerly Tahoe) is an unincorporated town in Placer County, California. Tahoe City is located on the shore of Lake Tahoe, at the outlet of the Truckee River.

The site was surveyed in 1863, and Tahoe House was built in 1864. The Tahoe post office opened in 1871, closed for a period in 1896, and changed its name to Tahoe City in 1949. The ZIP Code is 96145. For statistical purposes, Tahoe City is included in the Sunnyside-Tahoe City census-designated place (CDP).

== Climate ==
Due to its high elevation, Tahoe City has a dry-summer humid continental climate (Köppen Dsb) with dry summers featuring very warm days and cool nights, plus chilly winters with regular snowfall. The annual snowfall of 170.8 inches or 4.34 metres (median snowfall is 145.8 inches or 3.70 metres) is remarkable for a place with only twelve days typically not topping freezing: it is indeed so heavy that the mean maximum snow depth is as high as 52 inches or 1.32 metres despite much melting and refreezing due to persistent freeze/thaw cycles. As a comparison, higher, colder, but drier Bodie has a mean maximum snow depth of only 32 inches or 0.81 metres – three-fifths that of Tahoe City. The heaviest daily snowfall in Tahoe City was 42.0 inches (1.07 m) on January 15, 1952, and again on April 3, 1958, and the most in a season 341.4 inches or 8.67 metres between July 1937 and June 1938. The most snow on the ground has been 166 inches or 4.22 metres on March 20, 1952, and snow usually melts except in abnormally wet years during April; however there remained as much as 21 inches or 0.53 metres on the ground on average during May 1967 after a wet winter.

During summer, Tahoe City is generally dry; though thunderstorms may bring rain to the region. As is typical for the region, summer days are very warm and sunny, but nights can be chilly and temperatures below 32 °F or 0 °C have occasionally been reported even in July and August: on July 1, 1975, the temperature fell as low as 22 °F (−5.6 °C). The hottest temperature reported in Tahoe City is 94 °F (34.4 °C) on August 15, 1933, and the coldest −16 °F (−26.7 °C) on December 11 of 1972; although on average only 1.4 nights per winter will fall to or under 0 °F or −17.8 °C, 204.3 nights on average fall to or below freezing and only five nights stay above 50 °F or 10 °C, with no occurrence of so high a minimum known between October 9 and May 29 inclusive.

Climate data for Tahoe City (1991–2020 normals, extremes 1909–present)
Month	Jan	Feb	Mar	Apr	May	Jun	Jul	Aug	Sep	Oct	Nov	Dec	Year
Record high °F (°C)	60 (16)	60 (16)	70 (21)	74 (23)	89 (32)	92 (33)	93 (34)	94 (34)	90 (32)	80 (27)	70 (21)	60 (16)	94 (34)
Mean maximum °F (°C)	51.8 (11.0)	53.3 (11.8)	58.6 (14.8)	66.7 (19.3)	75.2 (24.0)	82.5 (28.1)	87.0 (30.6)	85.9 (29.9)	82.0 (27.8)	74.0 (23.3)	63.0 (17.2)	52.9 (11.6)	88.0 (31.1)
Mean daily maximum °F (°C)	39.6 (4.2)	40.5 (4.7)	44.6 (7.0)	50.1 (10.1)	59.2 (15.1)	69.3 (20.7)	78.0 (25.6)	77.4 (25.2)	70.4 (21.3)	59.2 (15.1)	47.7 (8.7)	39.7 (4.3)	56.3 (13.5)
Daily mean °F (°C)	30.1 (−1.1)	30.8 (−0.7)	34.3 (1.3)	38.9 (3.8)	46.6 (8.1)	54.6 (12.6)	62.0 (16.7)	61.4 (16.3)	55.4 (13.0)	45.9 (7.7)	36.8 (2.7)	30.2 (−1.0)	43.9 (6.6)
Mean daily minimum °F (°C)	20.6 (−6.3)	21.1 (−6.1)	24.1 (−4.4)	27.6 (−2.4)	33.9 (1.1)	40.0 (4.4)	46.0 (7.8)	45.4 (7.4)	40.5 (4.7)	32.6 (0.3)	25.9 (−3.4)	20.7 (−6.3)	31.5 (−0.3)
Mean minimum °F (°C)	6.9 (−13.9)	7.8 (−13.4)	11.2 (−11.6)	16.3 (−8.7)	24.9 (−3.9)	29.4 (−1.4)	38.0 (3.3)	38.0 (3.3)	31.1 (−0.5)	23.6 (−4.7)	13.3 (−10.4)	6.7 (−14.1)	2.4 (−16.4)
Record low °F (°C)	−15 (−26)	−15 (−26)	−6 (−21)	1 (−17)	9 (−13)	22 (−6)	22 (−6)	28 (−2)	21 (−6)	9 (−13)	0 (−18)	−16 (−27)	−16 (−27)
Average precipitation inches (mm)	6.21 (158)	5.72 (145)	4.95 (126)	2.23 (57)	1.57 (40)	0.61 (15)	0.17 (4.3)	0.30 (7.6)	0.42 (11)	1.89 (48)	3.21 (82)	6.00 (152)	33.28 (845)
Average snowfall inches (cm)	37.9 (96)	41.3 (105)	34.7 (88)	14.0 (36)	2.8 (7.1)	0.2 (0.51)	0.0 (0.0)	0.0 (0.0)	0.1 (0.25)	2.4 (6.1)	9.4 (24)	36.2 (92)	179.0 (455)
Average precipitation days (≥ 0.01 in)	10.6	10.3	10.4	8.0	6.8	3.1	1.2	1.7	2.4	4.3	7.3	10.7	76.8
Average snowy days (≥ 0.1 in)	7.2	7.5	7.5	4.2	1.2	0.2	0.0	0.0	0.1	0.7	3.3	6.8	38.7
Source 1: NOAA
Source 2: National Weather Service

== See also ==
- Sunnyside-Tahoe City, California (CDP)
- Watson Log Cabin
- UC Davis Tahoe Environmental Research Center (TERC)
